= Sukumar filmography =

Filmography of Sukumar

Sukumar is an Indian film director, screenwriter, and producer who works in Telugu cinema. One of the highest-paid directors in Indian cinema, his notable films include Arya 2 (2009),1: Nenokkadine (2014), Rangasthalam (2018), Pushpa: The Rise (2021), and Pushpa 2: The Rule (2024). In addition to his directorial work, Sukumar has produced films under his banner Sukumar Writings, including Kumari 21F (2015), Uppena (2021), and Virupaksha (2023).

== As director and writer ==
Key
| † | Denotes films that have not yet been released |

| Year | Title | Notes | Ref. |
|---|---|---|---|
| 2004 | Arya | Debut | |
| 2007 | Jagadam | | |
| 2009 | Arya 2 | | |
| 2011 | 100% Love | | |
| 2014 | 1: Nenokkadine | | |
| 2014 | I Am That Change | Short film | |
| 2016 | Nannaku Prematho | | |
| 2018 | Rangasthalam | | |
| 2021 | Pushpa: The Rise | | |
| 2024 | Pushpa 2: The Rule | | |
| TBD | RC 17 † | | |

== Other credits ==
Key
| † | Denotes films that have not yet been released |

- All films are in Telugu, unless mentioned otherwise.

=== As producer and writer ===
| Year | Title | Producer | Writer | Notes | Ref. |
|---|---|---|---|---|---|
| 2015 | Kumari 21F | Yes | Yes | Association with PA Motion Pictures | |
| 2018 | Kumari 21F | Presenter | Yes | Kannada film; remake of Kumari 21F | |
| 2020 | 100% Kadhal | Presenter | Story | Tamil film; remake of 100% Love | |
| 2021 | Uppena | Yes | No | | |
| 2022 | 18 Pages | No | Yes | | |
| 2023 | Virupaksha | Yes | Screenplay | | |
| 2024 | Manjummel Boys | Presenter | No | Telugu dubbed version | |
| 2025 | Gandhi Tatha Chettu | Presenter | No | | |
| 2026 | Peddi | Yes | No | | |
| 2026 | Vrushakarma | Yes | Story | | |

=== As an actor ===
| Year | Title | Notes | Ref. |
|---|---|---|---|
| 2019 | Nani's Gang Leader | Cameo appearance | |
| 2019 | Gaddalakonda Ganesh | Cameo appearance | |
| 2022 | Aadavallu Meeku Johaarlu | Narrator; voice role | |
