= Kumari 21F (soundtrack) =

Kumari 21F (Original Motion Picture Soundtrack)

Soundtrack album by Devi Sri Prasad
- Released: 30 October 2015
- Recorded: 2015
- Genre: Feature film soundtrack
- Length: 20:13
- Language: Telugu
- Label: Aditya Music
- Producer: Devi Sri Prasad

Devi Sri Prasad chronology
Shivam (2015)	Kumari 21F (Original Motion Picture Soundtrack) (2015)	Nenu Sailaja (2016)

Kumari 21F (Original Motion Picture Soundtrack) is the soundtrack to the 2015 romantic drama film of the same name directed by Palnati Surya Pratap, written and produced by Sukumar, starring Raj Tarun and Hebah Patel. The film's musical score is composed by Devi Sri Prasad and featured lyrics written by Prasad, Ramanjaneyulu, Krishna Kanth and Chandrabose, Sri Mani and Anantha Sreeram. The soundtrack was released under the Aditya Music label on 30 October 2015 to positive reviews from critics.

== Development ==
Sukumar's norm collaborator Devi Sri Prasad signed in as the film's composer during October 2014. After reading the script, Prasad agreed to score the film without charging any remuneration. All the songs were unconventional and fresh to the theme and storyline.

Besides composing, Prasad wrote the lyrics for the song "Bang Bang Bangkok", which he sang with Ranina Reddy and Rita, and also handled choreography. Prasad composed a few signature steps during the composition of the song which Sukumar and cinematographer R. Rathnavelu liked and insisted him to choreograph the entire song. Ramanjaneyulu wrote the lyrics for the song "Love Cheyyala Vadda" which insists the thoughts of love from a boy's point of view and is sung by Narendra. The song "Baby U Gonna Miss Me" featured lyrics written by Krishna Kanth and sung by Prasad's brother Sagar. The song "Break Up Patch Up" featured lyrics written by Chandrabose, who previously did the same for the albums in Sukumar–Prasad combination and is sung by M. M. Manasi.

For "Meghaalu Lekunna", which was sung by Yazin Nizar, Sri Mani wrote the pallavi and Anantha Sreeram wrote the charanams. "Meghaalu Lekunna" was recorded using a live orchestra, which Nizar found "rare these days".

== Release ==
The soundtrack album was released on 30 October 2015 at Shilpakala Vedika, Hyderabad, with actor Allu Arjun attending the event as the guest of honour. Aditya Music marketed the film's soundtrack album through digital and physical formats.

== Reception ==
Karthik Srinivasan of The Hindu said the song "Meghaalu Lekunna", "sounds at best like the Telugu version of a song by the Hindi pop band Euphoria", that the tune is "similarly lush and folkish", and that Prasad does "some interesting things in the interludes—the use of violins and solo-violin in the first and second interludes, to be specific". In his review for Milliblog, he further described the album as a "strictly ho-hum material from Devi Sri Prasad".

Madhavi Tata of Outlook India called Prasad's music, particularly "Love Cheyyala Vadda" ("To love or not to"), a "winner". The Times of India gave the soundtrack 2 stars out of 5 and said the album "falls desperately short" of the standards expected from Prasad. The reviewer called "Meghaalu Lekunna" a "beautiful and melodious track, courtesy the tantalising acoustic guitar, violin and flute sounds", and praised Nisar's rendition of it. A reviewer from The Hans India described the film's music and background score to be "impressive".

== Track listing ==
Kumari 21F (Original Motion Picture Soundtrack) track listing
No.	Title	Lyrics	Artist(s)	Length
1.	"Bang Bang Bangkok"	Devi Sri Prasad	Devi Sri Prasad, Ranina Reddy, Rita	3:30
2.	"Meghaalu Lekunna"	Sri Mani, Ananta Sriram	Yazin Nizar	4:59
3.	"Love Cheyyala Vadda"	Ramanjaneyulu	Narendra	3:23
4.	"Baby U Gonna Miss Me Remix"	Krishna Kanth	Sagar	4:02
5.	"Break Up Patch Up"	Chandrabose	M. M. Manasi	4:19
Total length:				20:13

== Accolades ==
Accolades for Kumari 21F (Original Motion Picture Soundtrack)
Award (Note: Awards are in Alphabetical order.)	Date of ceremony (Note: Date is linked to the article about the awards held that year, wherever possible.)	Category	Recipient(s)	Result	Ref.
CineMAA Awards	12 June 2016	Best Music Director	Devi Sri Prasad	Won (Note: Also for Srimanthudu and S/O Satyamurthy)	
Filmfare Awards South	18 June 2016	Best Lyricist – Telugu	Anantha Sriram – ("Meghaalu Lekunna")	Won	
Filmfare Awards South	18 June 2016	Best Male Playback Singer – Telugu	Yazin Nizar – ("Meghaalu Lekunna")	Nominated	
Mirchi Music Awards South	27 July 2016	Album of the Year	Kumari 21F – Devi Sri Prasad	Nominated	
Mirchi Music Awards South	27 July 2016	Listeners Choice – Album of the Year	Kumari 21F – Devi Sri Prasad	Nominated	
Mirchi Music Awards South	27 July 2016	Song of the Year	"Bang Bang Bangkok"	Nominated	
Mirchi Music Awards South	27 July 2016	Song of the Year	"Meghaalu Lekunna"	Nominated	
Mirchi Music Awards South	27 July 2016	Listeners Choice – Song of the Year	"Meghaalu Lekunna"	Nominated	
Mirchi Music Awards South	27 July 2016	Music Composer of the Year	Devi Sri Prasad – (Meghaalu Lekunna")	Nominated	
Mirchi Music Awards South	27 July 2016	Lyricist of the Year	Anantha Sriram – ("Meghaalu Lekunna")	Nominated	
Mirchi Music Awards South	27 July 2016	Male Vocalist of the Year	Yazin Nizar – ("Meghaalu Lekunna")	Won	
Mirchi Music Awards South	27 July 2016	Female Vocalist of the Year	Ranina Reddy – ("Bang Bang Bangkok")	Nominated	
Mirchi Music Awards South	27 July 2016	Female Vocalist of the Year	M. M. Manasi – ("Break Up Patch Up")	Nominated	
Santosham Film Awards	14 August 2016	Best Music Director	Devi Sri Prasad	Won (Note: Also for Srimanthudu)	
