= Sukriti Veni =

Indian child actress

- Born: Sukriti Veni Bandreddi; 2010 or 2011 (age 15–16); Hyderabad, Telangana, India
- Notable work: Gandhi Tatha Chettu
- Father: Sukumar
- Awards: National Film Awards for Best Child Artist

Sukriti Veni Bandreddi is an aspiring musician and Indian child actress who works in Telugu cinema. She is the daughter of Telugu film director Sukumar. She made her debut with Gandhi Tatha Chettu (2025) for which she won National Film Award for Best Child Artist.

== Early life ==
Veni was born and brought up in Hyderabad, India and Boston, Massachusetts. Her father Sukumar is a director in the Telugu film industry. She is currently studying at International School of Hyderabad and attended Berklee College of Music, Boston.

== Filmography ==
Year	Title	Role	Notes	Ref.
2025	Gandhi Tatha Chettu	Gandhi	Debut Film	

== Awards ==
Year	Film	Award / Film Festival	Category	Result	Ref.
2024	Gandhi Tatha Chettu	Dubai International Film Festival	Best Debutante Child Artist	Won	
2025	Gandhi Tatha Chettu	National Film Awards	Best Child Artist	Won	
