= Anvitha Kollipara =

Indian-American Student

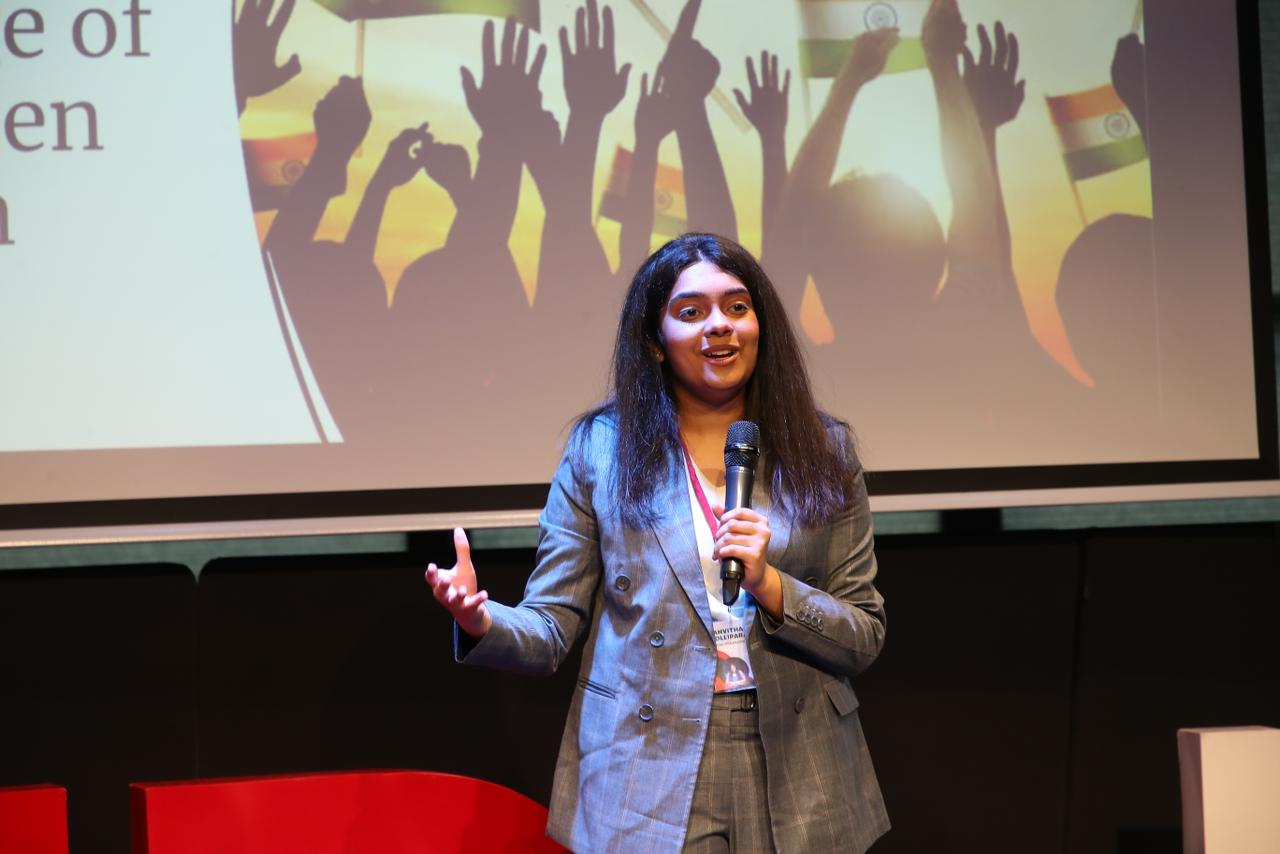
- Born: 18 March 2006 (age 20); New Haven, Connecticut
- Education: International School of Hyderabad (pursuing)
- Years active: 2020–present
- Organization: CareGood
- Known for: Social activism
- Parents: Vasu Kollipara (father); Sandhya Kollipara (mother)
- Awards: Womenpreneur of the Year 2021 by T-Hub

Anvitha Kollipara (born 18 March 2006) is an Indian-American social activist and the founder of the CareGood, an NGO. She also works at Nexteen which has been recognized by the Telangana Government.

== Early life ==
Anvitha Kollipara was born in New Haven, Connecticut on 18 March 2006 to Vasu Kollipara and Sandhya Kollipara. After living in North Carolina for several years, Her family moved back to Hyderabad. Kollipara has been active in debate, public speaking at political events, and Kuchipudi. She also won the under-16 national category for debate at the age of 11. She was a featured speaker at the New Indian Express and Edex's 75th Indian Independence Day.

== Career ==
She founded CareGood with a group of her friends during the COVID-19 crisis at the age of 14. The group identified old age homes in her vicinity that were at high risk due to limited resources and raised money for medical supplies for the homes.

She partnered with the Energy Swaraj Foundation to provide hundreds of solar lights to individual children in collaboration with workshops to teach them about the benefits of renewable energy.
