= Kumari 21F (2018 film) =

Indian romantic drama film

- Theatrical release poster
- Directed by: Sriman Vedula
- Written by: Sukumar (story); Prashanth Rajappa (dialogue)
- Based on: Kumari 21F (2015) by Palnati Surya Pratap
- Produced by: Ishan Saksena; Sunil Shah; Sanjay Agrawal
- Starring: Pranam Devaraj; Nidhi Kushalappa
- Music by: Mahati Swara Sagar
- Release date: 3 August 2018
- Country: India
- Language: Kannada

Kumari 21F is a 2018 Indian Kannada-language romantic drama film directed by Sriman Vedula and starring Pranam Devaraj and Nidhi Kushalappa. The film is a remake of the Telugu film of the same name, which itself is loosely based on the French film Lila Says.

== Cast ==
- Pranam Devaraj as Siddu
- Nidhi Kushalappa as Kumari
- Manoj Puttar
- Sangeeta
- Ravi Kale as ASP
- M. S. Umesh

== Production ==
Sukumar and his brother Vijayakumar selected newcomer Sriman Vedula to make his directorial debut. Sukumar. who was busy with Rangasthalam (2018) allowed Sriman to choose who he wanted to act in the film.

== Soundtrack ==
The music was composed by Mahati Swara Sagar.

== Release ==
The film had its premiere on 2 August 2018 in Bengaluru, which was attended by Prajwal Devaraj and Chiranjeevi Sarja. The film had its theatrical release on 3 August 2018.

== Reception ==
A critic from The Times of India rated the film two-and-a-half out of five stars and wrote that "Kumari 21F has a relevant message about stereotyping, and the idea behind the attempt is commendable. The film could have been made a little sharper. Though, it does make a decent one-time watch if you like films that are different from the run-of-the-mill masala entertainers". A critic from Chitraloka.com rated the film three-and-a-half out of five and wrote that "Overall Kumari 21F is a special film for many reasons. It is one of those commercial films with a haunting message that should not be missed. A new hero has arrived and a new director has given an unusual film. It is now for the audience to appreciate it".
