= 18 Pages =

2022 film by Palnati Surya Pratap

- Theatrical release poster
- Directed by: Palnati Surya Pratap
- Written by: Sukumar
- Produced by: Bunny Vas
- Starring: Nikhil Siddhartha; Anupama Parameswaran
- Cinematography: A. Vasanth
- Edited by: Naveen Nooli
- Music by: Gopi Sundar
- Production companies: GA2 Pictures; Sukumar Writings
- Release date: 23 December 2022
- Running time: 133 minutes
- Country: India
- Language: Telugu
- Budget: ₹16 crore
- Box office: est. ₹25 crore

18 Pages is a 2022 Indian Telugu-language romantic comedy-thriller film written by Sukumar and directed by Palnati Surya Pratap. Produced by GA2 Pictures and Sukumar Writings, the film stars Nikhil Siddharth and Anupama Parameswaran. It received mixed to positive reviews from critics and the general public. The film has been streaming on Aha since January 2023 and is available on Netflix. It was loosely inspired by The Lake House (2006), starring Keanu Reeves and Sandra Bullock.

== Plot ==
Siddhu is a phone-addicted app developer who lives alone, far away from his family. One day, he intends to propose to his girlfriend, only to walk in on her cheating on him, which leaves him in a depressed state. In his humiliation, Siddhu attacks his ex-girlfriend's new boyfriend, due to which he lands in the police station. As his father bails him out, he angrily lashes out at home for losing his grandfather after his grandmother died. In that depression, he decides to burn all of his memories with his ex-girlfriend. In that process, he finds a book in his home which he actually on the road where he collapses before. Siddhu discovers that the book he found on the road is actually someone's personal diary and begins to read it.

The diary belongs to Nandini. Nandini is a strange woman who does not use a Mobile Phone, and believes in human interaction. Siddu connects with the diary and develops feelings for the woman. Nandini visited Hyderabad to deliver a letter from her grandfather to a man named Venkat Rao. Through her journey of contacting him, she goes to an orphanage, helps a bus conductor and so on. She was also attacked by anonymous people and was in trouble, where once she was also tried to kidnap, but is saved by a well known boy of her and Dr.Sandeep (Also Siddhu's neighbour) whom she later becomes close with. Nandini develops feelings for him, but later realises that it's not love and breaks up with him.

After 18 pages of reading, the diary happened to be empty. At first, Siddhu thought she stopped her diary journalism since her task was completed. When he goes to meet her at her hometown, Siddhu discovers a shocking revelation from Nandini's grandmother that both Nandini and her friend Sanjana died in a car accident a year prior.

Siddhu could not digest the fact that the woman he loved had died. Through the advice from his grandfather, he decides to complete her unattended tasks to make himself and everyone around feel that Nandini is alive. As he completes those tasks, he gets to know that Nandini is still alive through a bus conductor who happened to see Nandini in the ICU 2 days after she was believed to be dead.

To find more clues as to where Nandini is, Siddhu begins his search for the letter that was supposed to be passed to Venkat Rao. Siddhu finds out that an architect Talwar was trying to kill Nandini for that cover as it contains proof to a case that he is being prosecuted against and hopes to destroy it. He tracks down that Nandini is not dead and is alive through her death certificate which was fake and was made by Sandeep who protected her safely from Talwar till now, who planned Nandini's accident due to which Sanjana lost her life. Siddhu decides to not meet her as he understands that she may not love him back.

Six months later, Nandini returns to her regular life and is surprised to see all her tasks she hoped to complete before the accident accomplished by Siddu. She ponders his identity and enquires with the bus conductor, Sandeep and Siddu's best friend, Bhagi. She finds out that Siddu will be going to Kashi to commemorate the death anniversary of Nandini's parents. In hopes to find Siddu, she boards the same compartment as him. She found out Siddu's identity when he tells a vendor to make muntha masala in Nandini's way. She finally recognizes and reciprocates her love to Siddu.

It is later revealed that in one of the tasks of Nandini, it was to buy a watch for an anonymous person who guarded her in a riot and broke his watch in the process. That person is revealed to be Siddu.

== Cast ==
- Nikhil Siddhartha as Siddhu
- Anupama Parameswaran as Nandini
- Dinesh Tej as Dr Sandeep
- Sarayu Roy as Bhagi, Siddhu's best friend
- Ajay as Rakesh Talwar
- Posani Krishna Murali as Lawyer Padmanabham
- Brahmaji as Mokkajona Joginatham, alias 'Mojo'
- Mounika Reddy as Sanjana, Nandini's best friend
- Goldie Nissy as Aarti
- Goparaju Ramana as Conductor
- Raghu Babu as Client
- Kancharapalem Raju as Nandini's grandfather
- Tenali Shakuntala as Nandini's grandmother
- Vadlamani Srinivas as Judge Vasudev
- Vamsi Nakkanti as Siddhu's father
- Niharika as Siddhu's mother
- Ravi Varma as Ajith, Siddhu's boss
- Raj Tirandasu as Rasheed

== Production ==
The principal photography of the film began in October 2020 in Hyderabad. Filming finished on 23 October 2022. Some scenes of the film were shot in Hyderabad Metro.

== Music ==
Music is composed by Gopi Sundar.

18 Pages

Soundtrack album by Gopi Sundar
- Released: 2022
- Studio: Sunsa Digital Workstation, Hyderabad; 20dB Sound Studios, Chennai; Gopi Sundar Music Production Hub, Cochin
- Genre: Feature film soundtrack
- Length: 12:36
- Language: Telugu
- Label: Aditya Music

Gopi Sundar chronology
Thattukada Muthal Semitheri Vare (score) (2022)	18 Pages (2022)	Vijayanand (2022)

All lyrics are written by Sri Mani.

Track list
No.	Title	Singer(s)	Length
1.	"Nannaya Raasina"	Prudhvi Chandra, Sithara Krishnakumar	4:40
2.	"Yedurangula Vaana"	Sid Sriram	4:20
3.	"Time Ivvu Pilla"	Silambarasan	3:36
Total length:			12:36
