= Sye Raa Narasimha Reddy =

2019 Indian film by Surender Reddy

- Theatrical release poster
- Directed by: Surender Reddy
- Screenplay by: Surender Reddy
- Dialogues by: Sai Madhav Burra
- Story by: Paruchuri brothers
- Produced by: Ram Charan
- Starring: Chiranjeevi; Sudeep; Vijay Sethupathi; Ravi Kishan; Jagapathi Babu; Nayanthara; Tamannaah Bhatia
- Narrated by: Pawan Kalyan
- Cinematography: R. Rathnavelu
- Edited by: A. Sreekar Prasad
- Music by: Songs: Amit Trivedi; Score: Julius Packiam
- Production company: Konidela Production Company
- Distributed by: Excel Entertainment & AA Films (Hindi); Super Good Films (Tamil); Gemini Studios (Malayalam)
- Release date: 2 October 2019
- Running time: 171 minutes
- Country: India
- Language: Telugu
- Budget: ₹200–300 crore (Note: Sye Raa Narasimha Reddy2's reported budget vary between ₹200 crore (Business Today, DNA India and India Today) – ₹300 (Business Line))
- Box office: est. ₹240 crore

Sye Raa Narasimha Reddy is a 2019 Indian Telugu-language epic historical action drama film directed by Surender Reddy and produced by Ram Charan under, Konidela Production Company. Reddy scripted the film based on an original story given by Paruchuri brothers. A work of fiction based on real-life historical events, the film tells the story of Uyyalawada Narasimha Reddy in his fight against the rule of the British East India Company from the Rayalaseema region of Andhra Pradesh. The film starred Chiranjeevi in the title character, with an ensemble cast including Sudeep, Vijay Sethupathi, Ravi Kishan, Jagapathi Babu, Nayanthara and Tamannaah Bhatia. Amitabh Bachchan (in his Telugu film debut) and Anushka Shetty appeared in guest appearances.

Sye Raa Narasimha Reddy was officially launched on 22 August 2017, coinciding with Chiranjeevi's birthday. Principal photography for the film began on 6 December 2017 and wrapped up on 24 June 2019. The film was shot in Hyderabad and Kerala with some scenes filmed in Georgia. The film's cinematography was handled by R. Rathnavelu, and it was edited by A. Sreekar Prasad. The soundtrack was composed by Amit Trivedi, while the background score was done by Julius Packiam.

Sye Raa Narasimha Reddy was released theatrically worldwide on 2 October 2019. The film garnered positive reviews from critics. However, it ended up as a major box office failure, grossing ₹240 crore at the box office against a budget of ₹200–300 crore.

== Plot ==
By 1857, the Indian subcontinent is in the grips of a widespread revolt against the rule of the British East India Company. The city of Jhansi is under siege by the British, and the defending soldiers begin to waver upon seeing that they are outnumbered. However, their queen, Rani Lakshmi Bai, motivates them by telling the tale of the rebel who started their war 10 years ago: Narasimha Reddy.

Reddy was born to the chief of Uyyalawada in the state of Hyderabad and his two wives are the daughters of the Nizam's chief. He defied death after being born still and coming to life, and is believed to be blessed by God with demonstrated athletic and acrobatic skills from a young age. One day, a teenage Reddy rides past an execution conducted by the British, and his grandfather explains the predicament faced by villagers under the rule of the East India Company. Reddy vows to retaliate and learns combat and philosophy under sage Gosayi Venkanna. 25 years later, Reddy gathers several fallen chiefs and kings from different provinces and organises a fully operational resistance in the city of Renadu. The kingdoms were taken over by British forces led by Cochrane, the governor of Madras. Cochrane is told of Reddy's resistance being effective against their rule and sends a general named Jackson to forcefully collect Renadu's taxes.

Reddy meets the dancer Lakshmi and saves her life from stampeding cattle, who have been drugged by fellow chief Avuku Raju, who is known to have hostility towards Reddy for his popularity. Reddy rounds up the cattle, forgives Avuku, and also displays feelings for Lakshmi. This comes to nothing as a child marriage has already been conducted between Reddy and a girl named Siddhamma, who has had feelings for Reddy even then. Due to omens, they were separated and reunited for a yagam. Upon learning this, Lakshmi attempts suicide, but Reddy convinces her to give life another chance. In the meantime, Jackson raids and pillages the surrounding regions of Renadu, and challenges Reddy by killing villagers who speak against him. In retaliation, Reddy attacks Jackson's home by himself and kills all of his soldiers. He eventually beheads him and sends his head to Cochrane.

The resistance grows stronger when Lakshmi travels across the nation and promotes it, leading Tamil chief Raja Pandiyan to join. Cochrane sends a battalion of hundreds of men led by his man Daniel, all of whom are killed when Reddy and a group of civilians hold themselves down in a fort, using strategic traps to counter their technology. Avuku reforms and helps Reddy defeat them, admiring his bravery. In the process, Siddhama gives birth to their child in the fort, and Reddy names him Subbaya after his farmer friend who perishes. As Reddy expands his army by training civilians, Cochrane manages to capture Lakshmi and use her to get to Reddy. When Lakshmi is told that Cochrane has enough ammunition and weapons to demolish the resistance, she lights her clothes on fire and causes an explosion, killing herself and the men. Cochrane however survives and gathers his remaining troops to make a final stand against Reddy's army. The two armies clash, and Cochrane kills Obanna while Raja Pandi is gravely injured Reddy saves him by defeating Cochrane in a duel. The rebels hold them back and kill 10,000 men, but Reddy is forced to go into hiding when an injured Cochrane continues to search for him.

A chief named Veera Reddy betrays the resistance out of anger since Reddy had killed his son for attempting to assassinate him and collect a British bounty on his head. At the same time, Reddy gave his treacherous brother a second chance but only to reveal his allies. It turns out that Reddy had spared and forgave him, without knowing that Veera had drugged Reddy's tea which weakened him, allowing Cochrane's men to capture him. Reddy is convicted and his supporters are exiled, but before Reddy is executed he gives a speech to his people telling them to stand strong and hold up the resistance. However, Reddy does not die even from hanging and escapes the noose. One of the soldiers beheads him, but even afterward, Reddy's body manages to stab Cochrane dead. Reddy's head is hung for a display to suppress the rebellion. Gosayi Venkanna, Avuku Raju and other supporters of Reddy are exiled from India.

10 years later, Rani Lakshmi Bai and her men fight the British and defeat them. A voice-over narration states that Reddy's rebellions will have served as inspiration for warriors and activists to gain their deserved freedom.

== Cast ==
Adapted from the opening and closing credits:

- Chiranjeevi as Narasimha Reddy, the leader of India's resistance and a supremely skilled warrior.
  - Rudra Soni and Krish Soni as young Narasimha
- Sudeep as Avuku Raju, a chief who is envious of Reddy's popularity but still admires his courage.
- Vijay Sethupathi as Raja Pandiyan, a Tamil warrior who joins the resistance against British
- Ravi Kishan as Basi Reddy, Reddy's half brother, who betrays the resistance for money.
- Jagapathi Babu as Veera Reddy, a chieftain member of the resistance whose son betrays the resistance. Believing Narasimha Reddy executed him while displaying partiality to his traitorous brother, he drugs Reddy, leading to his capture.
- Nayanthara as Siddhamma, Narasimha Reddy's wife, married to him during their childhood (a prevailing custom during that time).
- Tamannaah Bhatia as Lakshmi, Narasimha Reddy's estranged lover, and orphaned dancer who dedicates her art to God.
- Henry Maynard as Cochrane, the Governor of Madras Presidency and main antagonist. He commanded the attacks against the rebellion.
- Oscar Skagerberg as Jackson, the general who challenges Reddy by killing Renadu's villagers.
- Matthew Stirling as Daniel, the leader of the battalion that Cochrane sends against Reddy.
- Mark Kitto as Inglish, Court Judge
- Brahmaji as Vadde Obanna, Reddy's deputy.
- Ranadhir Reddy as Narsi Reddy
- Nassar as Jayarami Reddy, Narasimha Reddy's grandfather
- Pawan Kalyan, Kamal Haasan and Mohanlal as the narrators (in special voice-overs in their languages)
- Tanikella Bharani as Swamiji Govindayya Sharma
- Mukesh Rishi as Papa Khan, an Islamic chief and member of the resistance.
- Raghu Babu as Ragavachari, the tax officer appointed by Cochrane and Jackson.
- Prudhvi Raj as Madhavayyar, a worker of Cochrane.
- Anand as Kumara Mallareddy, Narasimha Reddy's elder brother
- Ajay Rathnam as Malla Reddy
- Ravi Varma as Varada Reddy
- Raghu Karumanchi as Bulli Reddy
- Sai Chand as Subbaya, a kind elderly farmer who is threatened by Jackson.
- Lakshmi Gopalaswamy as Seethamma, Narasimha Reddy's mother
- Pavitra Lokesh as Neelamma
- Rohini as Padmamma
- Niharika Konidela as Bhagyam
- Prem Vinny as Basavayya
- Charandeep
- Saanve Megghana

Cameo appearance

- Amitabh Bachchan as Guru Gosayi Venkanna, Reddy's teacher in combat and philosophy.
- Anushka Shetty as Rani Lakshmibai, the queen of Jhansi city who leads the Sepoy Mutiny

== Production ==
=== Development ===
Following the phenomenal success of the Chiranjeevi-starrer Khaidi No. 150 (2017), Ram Charan, who made his production debut through this film, announced that he will collaborate with his father Chiranjeevi for the second time. Touted to be mostly based on the life of Indian independence activist Uyyalawada Narasimha Reddy from the Rayalaseema region of Andhra Pradesh, the script was written by Paruchuri brothers, and was rumoured to cast Bollywood actress Aishwarya Rai Bachchan, opposite Chiranjeevi, although her dates had not been finalised. Amitabh Bachchan and Ravi Kishan were reported to sign in pivotal roles. In June 2017, a still featuring Chiranjeevi in a tweaked moustache went viral, with many fans supposed to mention about his look for the film. On 22 August 2017, the makers released the motion poster of the film, revealing the title as Sye Raa Narasimha Reddy, and was announced that the film will be made on a budget of ₹125 crore. It was revealed that the makers spent more than ₹45 crore on the film's visual effects out of its total budget.

=== Casting ===
Soon after the launch of the film, Vijay Sethupathi and Amitabh Bachchan was hired to play a crucial role in the film, marking their debuts in the Telugu film industry. Sudeepa, Jagapathi Babu and Nayanthara were hired to play pivotal characters. Bachchan was essayed to play a short role of Chiranjeevi's mentor in the film, while Vijay Sethupathi's role was reported to be a close aide of the protagonist. Tamannaah Bhatia was hired to play the second female lead in April 2018. Chiranjeevi's niece Niharika Konidela, was hired for a crucial sequence in September 2018. In May 2019, Anushka Shetty was confirmed to play a cameo role in the film. She was reportedly playing the role of Rani Lakshmibai, in which the story was narrated through her perspective.

==== Crew ====
Cinematographer Ravi Varman who was initially signed for the project, was replaced by R. Rathnavelu, after he walked out of the project due to schedule conflicts. Rajeevan was signed to do production designing. Anju Modi, Uthara Menon, Sushmita Konidela was signed to work as costume designers. London-based stunt choreographers Greg Powell, Lee Whittaker and Ram Lakshman choreographed the action sequences.

=== Filming ===
Principal photography of the film kickstarted on 6 December 2017. The first schedule of the film was kickstarted on an aluminium factory located at Hyderabad, with the presence of Chiranjeevi and Brahmaji. The first schedule of the film was completed on 25 December. The second schedule of the film which was supposed to happen in January 2018, was postponed due to 20 February 2018. This schedule will be shot across Kerala, where Chiranjeevi and Nayanthara will be present. In March 2018, Nayanthara joined the sets of the film, after the shooting of her Tamil film Viswasam (2019), with Ajith Kumar, has been interrupted due to a strike. The unit has completed some action sequences under the guidance of a team of stunt choreographers from South Africa. Amitabh Bachchan joined the sets of the film in Hyderabad on 28 March 2018.

On 17 April, the shooting of the film was called off for unknown reasons, and was resumed later on 7 June 2018. Rajeevan erected a grant village set for a war sequence, which will be shot in night effect. The team spent 35 nights to shoot the entire schedule, which was wrapped up on 27 July 2018. In August 2018, the makers shot an action sequence at the Ramoji Film City in Hyderabad. In September 2018, a crucial war sequence was filmed, which cost the makers ₹45 crore. On late September 2018, the makers film an extensive climax sequence at Georgia, which was filmed within 25 days. A single stretch schedule was completed on 1 November to 10 December, followed by the team which went to shoot some sequences in Mysore.

In March 2019, Amitabh Bachchan rejoined the sets of the film, to complete few portions of the film, which were completed on 19 March 2019. Kiccha Sudeep, too entered the last schedule of the film on 29 March and completed late April. The makers filmed few scenes at Kerala on 19 April 2019, for a 10-day schedule which had battle sequences and several crucial scenes to be shot. After this schedule, the team returned to Hyderabad to shoot some important sequences with patchwork, which will be the last schedule in the entire shooting part.

The final schedule took place at a specially erected set in Kokapet which resembles a huge kingdom. On 2 May 2019, a major fire broke out at Chiranjeevi's farmhouse due to a short circuit. The farmhouse which was located nearby the shooting location, made a significant part of the film's set burnt to ashes, which made the makers lose more than ₹2 crore. Due to which the team had halted the shooting midway. On mid-May 2019, Anushka Shetty shot her cameo sequences for the film, followed by a shoot of a special song featuring Nayanthara and Chiranjeevi in a customised set at Annapurna Studios. On 24 June 2019, the entire shooting process of the film was wrapped.

== Music ==
Sye Raa Narasimha Reddy

Soundtrack album by Amit Trivedi
- Released: 1 September 2019
- Recorded: 2018–2019
- Genre: Feature film soundtrack
- Length: 18:27
- Language: Telugu
- Labels: Lahari Music; T-Series
- Producer: Amit Trivedi

Amit Trivedi chronology
Mission Mangal (2019)	Sye Raa Narasimha Reddy (2019)	Gunjan Saxena: The Kargil Girl (2020)

A. R. Rahman was initially approached to compose the music for the film, but in November 2017, he announced that, he will not be a part of this project, citing a busy schedule. After Rahman's refusal, composers Thaman S (who provided music for the film's motion poster), Hiphop Tamizha and Himesh Reshammiya were reportedly in consideration. In February 2018, Ilaiyaraaja was rumoured to compose music for te flick, however no official announcement has been made in development. In July 2018, Amit Trivedi was hired to compose music for the film, thus making his debut in the Telugu film industry. Julius Packiam provided the background score for the film. Sirivennela Seetharama Sastry, Anantha Sriram, Chandrabose, Swanand Kirkire, Madhan Karky, Azad Varadaraj, and Siju Thuravoor wrote the lyrics for the soundtrack in Telugu, Hindi, Tamil, Kannada, and Malayalam respectively.

Lahari Music acquired the music rights for Telugu, Tamil, Malayalam and Kannada languages, whereas Hindi music rights were sold to T-Series. Prior to the soundtrack release, the first song, "O Sye Raa" was released as the film's lead single on 1 September 2019, which had vocals by Sunidhi Chauhan and Shreya Ghoshal, rendering the song in all languages. The complete soundtrack album was released in all languages (Telugu, Tamil, Hindi, Malayalam, and Kannada) on the same day, through streaming platforms, whereas it was released later in YouTube on 2 September 2019.

Telugu
No.	Title	Lyrics	Singer(s)	Length
1.	"O Sye Raa"	Sirivennela Seetharama Sastry	Sunidhi Chauhan, Shreya Ghoshal	5:28
2.	"Jaago Narasimhaa Jaagore"	Sirivennela Seetharama Sastry	Shankar Mahadevan, Haricharan, Anurag Kulkarni	4:55
3.	"Andam Ankitam"	Anantha Sriram	Vijay Prakash, Shashaa Tirupati	4:00
4.	"Swaasalona Desame"	Chandrabose	Haricharan	4:02
Total length:				18:27

All lyrics are written by Madhan Karky.

Tamil
No.	Title	Singer(s)	Length
1.	"Sye Raa Title Track"	Sunidhi Chauhan, Shreya Ghoshal	5:27
2.	"Paaraai Narasimha Nee Paaraai"	Shankar Mahadevan, Haricharan, Anurag Kulkarni	4:55
3.	"Angam Unnidam"	Vijay Prakash, Shashaa Tirupati	4:00
4.	"Swasamagum Desame"	Haricharan	4:02
Total length:			18:27

All lyrics are written by Swanand Kirkire.

Hindi
No.	Title	Singer(s)	Length
1.	"Jaago Narsimha Jaago Re"	Udit Narayan, Shankar Mahadevan, Shaan	4:56
2.	"Sandal Meraa Mann"	Abhijeet Srivastava, Shreya Ghoshal	4:00
3.	"Sye Raa Title Track"	Sunidhi Chauhan, Shreya Ghoshal	5:28
4.	"Saansein Teri Desh Hai"	KK	4:03
Total length:			18:27

All lyrics are written by Siju Thuravoor.

Malayalam
No.	Title	Singer(s)	Length
1.	"Sye Raa Title Track"	Sunidhi Chauhan, Shreya Ghoshal	5:28
2.	"Unaroo Narasimhaperumale"	Shankar Mahadevan, Haricharan, Anurag Kulkarni	4:55
3.	"Neram Aagatham"	Vijay Prakash, Shreya Ghoshal	4:00
4.	"Jeevanaya Deshame"	Haricharan	4:02
Total length:			18:27

All lyrics are written by Azad Varadaraj.

Kannada
No.	Title	Singer(s)	Length
1.	"Sye Raa Title Track"	Sunidhi Chauhan, Shreya Ghoshal	5:28
2.	"Jaago Narasimha"	Shankar Mahadevan, Haricharan, Anurag Kulkarni	4:55
3.	"Adharam Ankitham"	Vijay Prakash, Shreya Ghoshal	4:00
4.	"Shwasadallu Deshave"	Haricharan	4:02
Total length:			18:27

=== Music reception ===
Album ratings
Review scores
Source	Rating
IndiaGlitz	2.75/5
Musicaloud	3/5

Neeshita Nyayapati of The Times of India wrote that "The album of Sye Raa is underwhelming, with Amit trying too hard to match up his numbers to the grandeur of the film. What's more disappointing is the lack of traditional Andhra elements in the film's music, despite the story being set in the 1800s. But O Syeraa and Swaasalone Desame somehow manage to make up for the mediocrity of the other two songs." Vipin of Musicaloud on reviewing the music of the film, gave 3 out of 5 stars and stated that "Amit Trivedi's Telugu debut is pretty much along the lines of Baahubali – majestic in an expected way and partly comes across as dependent on the elaborate visuals to bolster its appeal."

123telugu.com stated that "The album of Sye Raa is a completely situational album which takes the story ahead with its lyrics and compositions. Every song is special in itself as Amit Trivedi has given a lot of heart and soul which evoke good emotions and patriotism. This is not the regular commercial album and is the one which will impress you once you watch the lavish and beautiful visuals on screen. For now, the makers have got the music right which will surely take the narrative to another level."

== Marketing ==
The film's pre-release event which was supposed to be held on 18 September 2019 at Kurnool, was cancelled due to heavy rains on the location. Instead on the said date, the makers launched the official trailer of the film. The event was later held on 22 September 2019, at the Lal Bahadur Sastri Stadium in Hyderabad, with the presence of the cast and crew and other celebrities. Another pre-release event was held on 29 September 2019 in Bangalore.

Popular Indian comic book company, Amar Chitra Katha collaborated with the film for its promotion, where a comic book based on the life of Uyyalawada Narasimha Reddy, was launched during the film's pre-release event. To promote the film, the makers headed a city tour in Bangalore, Cochin, Chennai and Mumbai. Amarapali Jewels teamed up the film, and launched a special collection of jewellery, which were used in the film. A pre release event was also held in Chennai, to promote the film's Tamil version.

== Release ==
Sye Raa Narasimha Reddy was initially scheduled to release in January 2019, which planned to coincide with the Sankranthi occasion. However, it was postponed to the occasion of summer, due to Ram Charan's Vinaya Vidheya Rama (2019), being released on the Sankranthi occasion. The release was further postponed due to delay in film production and the makers finalised for a Dussehra occasion (7 October 2019), although being preponed to 2 October 2019, since the release coincides with Gandhi Jayanti and also adding the benefits of the extended holiday weekend. On 23 September 2019, the film was sent to the Central Board of Film Certification for public viewing, where it received U/A certificate from the officials.

The film opened on more than 4,800 screens worldwide, including over 3,000 screens across India, with 1,270 screens in Andhra Pradesh and Telangana. It had six shows on the day of its release, including a special midnight premiere. despite clashing with the Hindi film War (2019), and the Hollywood film Joker (2019). The film's Hindi version was distributed by Rithesh Sidhwani and Farhan Akhtar, under their Excel Entertainment banner. The film's Kannada distribution rights were bagged by Dheeraj Enterprises for a sum of ₹27 crore. The film made a business of ₹200 crore, before release. Weekend Cinemas acquired the distribution rights of the film in the United States and it was premiered a day before the Indian release, on 1 October 2019.

=== Home media ===
The digital rights of the film were sold to Amazon Prime Video for ₹40 crore. The film was released on the streaming platform (simultaneously in all languages), after its theatrical run, on 21 November 2019.

== Reception ==
=== Critical response ===
Sye Raa Narasimha Reddy received positive reviews from the critics. On the review aggregator website Rotten Tomatoes, 57% of 7 critics' reviews are positive, with an average rating of 5.8/10.

Neeshita Nyayapati of The Times of India gave the film 3.5/5 stars and wrote, "Sye Raa Narasimha Reddy might work only in bits and pieces, but the scenes in which the film works make it all worthwhile!" She opined that the film follows the story of Uyyalawada Narasimha Reddy, a palegaar from Kurnool who rebels against British oppression in the 1840s, inspired by his love for a classical dancer and the teachings of his guru. While the film boasts a stellar cast and impressive technical elements, its screenplay lacks emotional depth and cohesion, ultimately making it a showcase for Chiranjeevi's commanding performance. Rahul Devulapalli of The Week rated the film 3.5/5 stars, stating, "Mute your fact-checker before you enter the cinema." He noted that the film highlights Chiranjeevi's impressive performance as the titular rebel, supported by a strong cast and exceptional direction, particularly in its action-packed second half. However, while the film boasts stunning visuals and engaging battle scenes, it takes significant liberties with historical accuracy, making it more of a fictionalised narrative than a true biopic.

Hemanth Kumar of Firstpost gave the film 3.5/5 stars, stating, "Sye Raa Narasimha Reddy tells a fascinating story about a rebellion that's never been explored in Telugu cinema." He opined that the film effectively captures the lesser-known uprising against British rule in the Rayalaseema region, showcasing Chiranjeevi's powerful performance as a unifying leader amid a well-established context of oppression. However, while it excels in visual storytelling and action sequences, it falters in character development and emotional depth, making some plot elements feel overly convenient and repetitive. Sangeetha Devi Dundoo of The Hindu remarked, "The makers skilfully use cinematic liberties to play to the mainstream, crowd-pleasing format." She observed that the film, while inspired by the life of Uyyalawada Narasimha Reddy, embraces cinematic dramatization and populist appeal, showcasing Chiranjeevi in a memorable performance that pays homage to his superstar image. Despite some drawn-out war sequences, the film effectively weaves together a rich tapestry of characters and visuals, supported by strong performances from the ensemble cast, making it a compelling watch for both fans and newcomers.

DNA India gave Sye Raa Narasimha Reddy 3.5 out of 5 stars, commenting, "Chiranjeevi and Amitabh Bachchan's 'Sye Raa Narasimha Reddy' has enough strength to start a rebellion even today." They noted that the film tells the story of India's first rebellion against the East India Company, blending iconic storytelling with stunning visuals and a powerful performance by Chiranjeevi. While the film features a strong cast and impressive action sequences, some scenes feel incomplete, which impacts the overall pacing and coherence of the narrative.

Shruti Rhode of Times Now News gave the film 3/5 stars, stating, "Chiranjeevi and Sudeep deliver powerful performances in this magnum opus." She pointed out that the film is a grand cinematic tribute to the legendary freedom fighter Uyyalawada Narasimha Reddy, showcasing bravery and resilience against British colonial rule. With a captivating storyline, impressive visuals, a powerful background score, and a strong supporting cast, the film offers an engaging experience that resonates with audiences while highlighting the struggles for independence. Janani K. of India Today gave the film 3 out of 5 stars, commenting, "Chiranjeevi's excellent performance makes up for an underwhelming screenplay." She noted that the film showcases impressive visual elements and engaging action sequences that captivate the audience. However, its formulaic structure and lengthy runtime detract from its overall impact, making some moments feel predictable and forced.

Apoorva Gupta of India TV gave a rating of 3 out of 5, stating, "Sye Raa Narasimha is a ride full of action, drama, and patriotism." According to her, the film features a strong cast and an intriguing storyline; however, its loose storytelling primarily centres around Chiranjeevi, which detracts from the development of other characters. Despite impressive performances, particularly by Amitabh Bachchan, the film's lengthy runtime and uneven pacing fail to leave a lasting impact on the audience. The Hans India rated the film 3 out of 5, stating, "Overall, Sye Raa Narasimha Reddy is an epic story that cannot be forgotten." In their opinion, Megastar Chiranjeevi delivers a strong performance as Narasimha Reddy, with notable support from Sudeep, Vijay Sethupathi, and Nayanthara, all directed by Surender Reddy. The film features impressive visuals and impactful dialogues that effectively convey the story of Uyyalawada Narasimha Reddy's rebellion against British rule, although some viewers may find the pacing uneven at times.

Krishna Sripada of The News Minute gave the film 2.5/5 stars, commenting, "Chiranjeevi still remains a man who can helm a magnanimous tale, but unless our writing goes deeper and becomes more layered, we will be stuck with superficially slick and intellectually mediocre projects such as these." In her view, the film presents a grand yet familiar tale of heroism, following the titular character's rebellion against British oppression, but it falls short in exploring deeper social issues, relying instead on well-worn tropes and predictable arcs. While the film boasts impressive action sequences and a stellar cast, it struggles with pacing and clarity, ultimately leaving viewers questioning its true narrative intent as either a war film or a social drama. Manoj Kumar R. of The Indian Express gave the film 2.5/5 stars, stating, "The major flaw in Sye Raa Narasimha Reddy is Surender's attempt to force a sprawling story into a mould that fits the narrow definition of mainstream commercial cinema." According to him, the film features Chiranjeevi in a compelling performance, supported by Amit Trivedi's effective background score that enhances several scenes. However, the film struggles with a disjointed narrative and relies on clichés, failing to provide a deep emotional connection or a fully immersive historical experience.

Baradwaj Rangan of Film Companion South wrote, "Even the biggest star needs the gravity of a strong screenplay, and that's where the film falters and ultimately fails." He noted that while the film showcases Chiranjeevi's charisma as he embodies the titular character, it ultimately struggles due to a weak screenplay that fails to provide depth or cohesion to the narrative. Despite its grand scale and potential for impactful moments, the film devolves into a predictable good-versus-evil saga, lacking the strong writing that could have elevated it to the level of its inspirations.

=== Box office ===
Sye Raa Narasimha Reddy earned ₹81.4 crore worldwide on its first day, making it the fifth biggest opener in South India. The Chennai box office, the Tamil and Telugu versions collectively generated ₹32 lakh, while the Hindi version earned ₹3.10 crore. In the southern markets, the film's combined gross reached ₹64.9 crore. In the overseas market, the film earned over $1 million from the US and £29,442 from the UK.

On its second day, the film surpassed ₹100 crore, and within five days, it grossed ₹124.80 crore worldwide. After 12 days, the total gross increased to ₹230 crore. By the end of its theatrical run, the film grossed ₹240 crore worldwide against a production budget of ₹200–300 crore.

== Authenticity ==
Historians across India have noted that the concept of Indian nationalism was not yet developed at the time. Instead, the rebellion was his struggle to keep his rights and privileges that the East India Company were trying to confiscate from him. Nekkanti Srinivasa Rao, a Telugu historian, told to media that the movie lacks historical accuracy, saying that Narasimha Reddy only questioned the British authorities for his monthly pension which he was supposed to inherit from his grandfather.

Telugu writer SDV Aziz who penned the popular biography of Narasimha Reddy Renati Surya Chandrulu was of the opinion that some cinematic liberty is necessary because of the emotional charge it needs to provide to the viewer. However, director Surender Reddy has made it clear to the Telangana High court that Sye Raa is not a biopic but is inspired by his life. The film was released with a disclaimer through which the makers emphasise that while the story is inspired by the life of Uyyalawada Narasimha Reddy, they do not claim historical accuracy for all the events shown in the narrative.

== Accolades ==
Award	Date of ceremony	Category	Recipient(s)	Result	Ref.
South Indian International Movie Awards	18 September 2021	Best Film – Telugu	Konidela Production Company	Nominated	
South Indian International Movie Awards	18 September 2021	Best Female Playback Singer – Telugu	Sunidhi Chauhan, Shreya Ghoshal for "Sye Raa"	Nominated	
South Indian International Movie Awards	18 September 2021	Best Cinematographer – Telugu	R. Rathnavelu	Nominated	
Zee Cine Awards Telugu	12 January 2020	Best Actor	Chiranjeevi	Won	
Zee Cine Awards Telugu	12 January 2020	Best Cinematographer	R. Rathnavelu	Won	
