= Ranina Reddy =

Indian playback singer

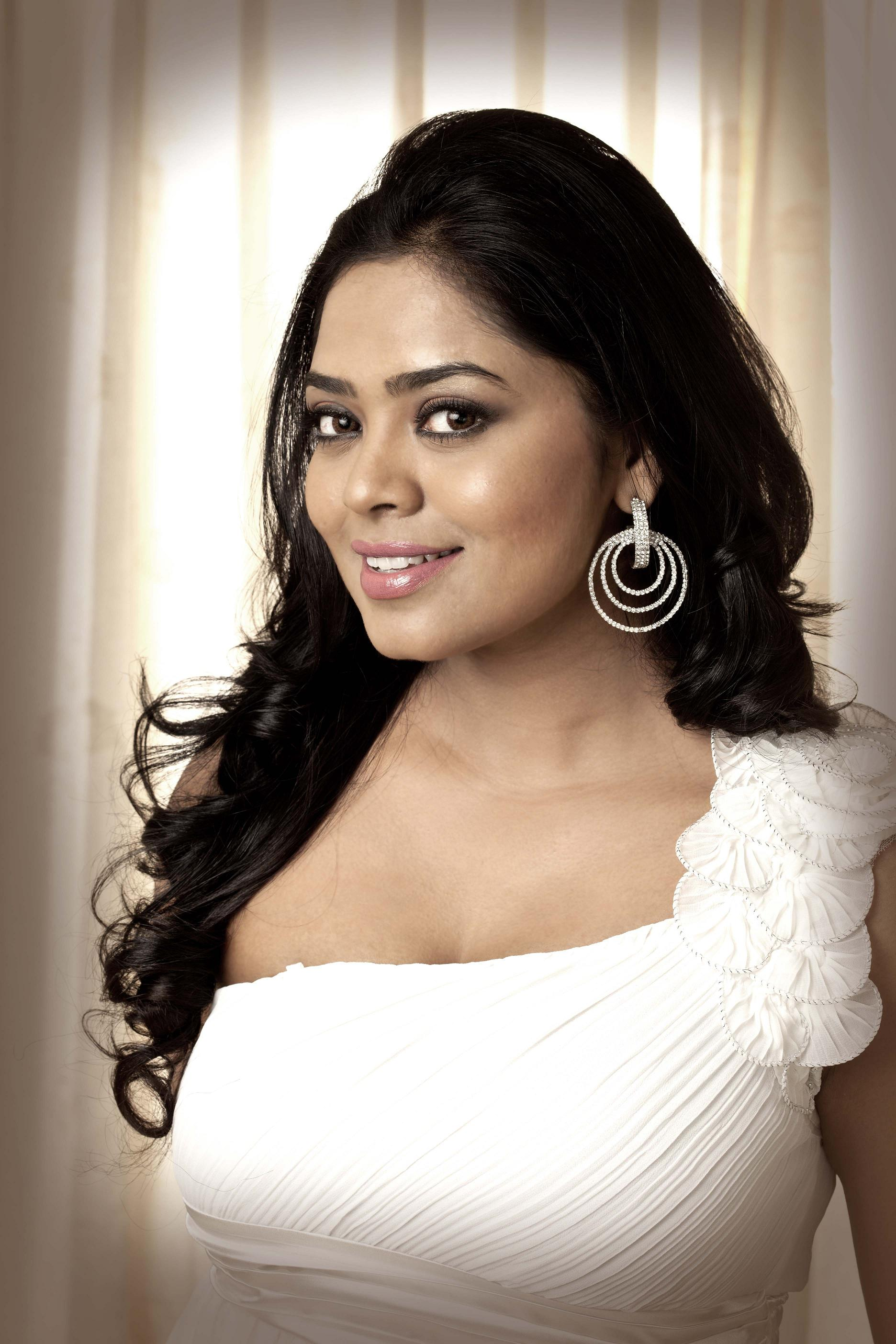

Background information
- Born: Bangalore, Karnataka, India
- Occupation: Playback singer
- Years active: 2008–present
- Website: facebook.com/RRmusics

Ranina Reddy is an Indian playback singer. She has sung mainly in Tamil and Telugu for various music composers including Yuvan Shankar Raja, Harris Jayaraj, Devi Sri Prasad, Thaman S, Selvaganesh, Raghu Dixit, and S.A. Rajkumar.

== Career ==
Reddy appeared in Venkat Prabhu's 2008 comedy thriller Saroja. She has since performed several songs, most notably for Harris Jayaraj.

== Discography ==
| Year | Film | Songs | Language | Composer | Notes |
|---|---|---|---|---|---|
| 2008 | Kuruvi | "Kuruvi Kuruvi" | Tamil | Vidyasagar | Uncredited |
| 2008 | Silandhi | "Idhu Kadhal Minsarama" | Tamil | Neil Mukherji | |
| 2008 | Jaal - The Net | "Mere Paas Aajao Na" | Hindi | Neil Mukherji | Dubbed version of Silandhi |
| 2008 | Saroja | "Kodana Kodi" | Tamil | Yuvan Shankar Raja | |
| 2009 | Current | "Rekkalu" | Telugu | Devi Sri Prasad | |
| 2009 | U and I | "D for Dance" | Telugu | Karthik M. | |
| 2009 | Chapter 6 | "Lakka Pidathala" | Telugu | P. C. Sivan | |
| 2009 | Chamkaisi Chindi Udaysi | "Jaya Ho" | Kannada | P. B. Balaji | |
| 2009 | Quick Gun Murugun | "Murugan Super Star" | English | Raghu Dixit | |
| 2009 | Bayam Ariyaan | "Dhara Dhiri" | Tamil | P. C. Sivan | |
| 2009 | Saarai Veerraju | "Atreyapuram" | Telugu | Sree Sai | Dubbed version of Saarai Veerraju |
| 2009 | Vettatam | "Thootukudi Ranida" | Tamil | Sree Sai | |
| 2010 | Orange | "Ola Olaala Ala" | Telugu | Harris Jayaraj | |
| 2010 | Singa Vettai | "Neeyum Naanum" | Tamil | Sandeep Chowta | |
| 2010 | Arumbu Meesai Kurumbu Paarvai | "Varugiran Kamadhoothan" | Tamil | Mohammed Rizwan | |
| 2010 | Thakita Thakita | "C'mon C'mon" | Telugu | Bobo Shashi | |
| 2010 | Drohi | "Konjam Konja Vendum" | Tamil | V. Selvaganesh | |
| 2011 | Ko | "Aga Naga Naga" | Tamil | Harris Jayaraj | |
| 2011 | Rangam | "Aga Naga Naga" | Telugu | Harris Jayaraj | Dubbed version of Ko |
| 2011 | Engeyum Kadhal | "Engeyum Kadhal" | Tamil | Harris Jayaraj | |
| 2011 | Engeyum Kadhal | "Thee lllai" | Tamil | Harris Jayaraj | |
| 2011 | Engeyum Kadhal | "Bathing at Cannes" | Tamil | Harris Jayaraj | |
| 2011 | Rowthiram | "Maalai Mangum Neram" | Tamil | Prakash Nikki | |
| 2011 | Roudram | "Mattey Raani" | Telugu | Prakash Nikki | |
| 2011 | Daggaraga Dooramga | "Kallu Kochaveyy" | Telugu | Raghu Kanche | |
| 2011 | Dhada | "Bhoome Gundranga" | Telugu | Devi Sri Prasad | |
| 2011 | Veera | "Veera Veera" | Telugu | Thaman S | |
| 2011 | Kandireega | "Angelina" | Telugu | Thaman S | |
| 2011 | Dookudu | "Adara Adara Adaragottu" | Telugu | Thaman S | |
| 2011 | Jhalak | "Manasu Manasutho" | Telugu | S. A. Rajkumar | |
| 2011 | Thulli Ezhandadhu Kaadhal | "Raagam Edhadhu Teriyadhu" | Tamil | Bobo Shashi | Dubbed version of Thakita Thakita |
| 2011 | Thulli Ezhandadhu Kaadhal | "C'mon Cmon" | Tamil | Bobo Shashi | Dubbed version of Thakita Thakita |
| 2011 | Mudhal Idam | "Mudhal Idham" | Tamil | D Imman | |
| 2011 | Engeyum Eppothum | "Govinda Govinda" | Tamil | C. Sathya | |
| 2011 | Journey | "Govinda Govinda" | Telugu | V. Selvaganesh | Dubbed version of Engaeyum Eppothum |
| 2012 | Shiva Manasulo Shruti | "Idhi Nijamey" | Telugu | N. R. Raghunanthan | |
| 2012 | Krishnaveni Panjaalai | "Un Kangal Kannadi" | Tamil | N. R. Raghunanthan | |
| 2012 | Casanovva | "Theme Song" | Malayalam | Gopi Sundar | |
| 2012 | Ninnu Chooste Love Vasthundhi | "Ennalugano" | Telugu | Harris Jayaraj | Dubbed version of Engeyum Kadhal |
| 2012 | Ninnu Chooste Love Vasthundhi | "Segaledhu Pogaledhu" | Telugu | Harris Jayaraj | Dubbed version of Engeyum Kadhal |
| 2012 | Ninnu Chooste Love Vasthundhi | "Bathing at Cannes" | Telugu | Harris Jayaraj | Dubbed version of Engeyum Kadhal |
| 2012 | Endukante... Premanta! | "Kicko Gicko" | Telugu | G.V. Prakash Kumar | |
| 2012 | Sarocharu | "Jaga Jaga Jagadeka Veera" | Telugu | Devi Sri Prasad | |
| 2012 | Julayi | "Mee Intiki Mundhoo" | Telugu | Devi Sri Prasad | |
| 2012 | Konjam Koffee Konjam Kaadhal | "Konjam Koffee Konjam Kadhal" | Tamil | Phani Kalyan | |
| 2012 | Konjam Koffee Konjam Kaadhal | "Sakkarakatti (Dance Mix)" | Tamil | Phani Kalyan | |
| 2013 | Thuppakki | "Kutti Puli Kootam" | Tamil | Harris Jayaraj | |
| 2013 | Alex Pandian | "Rayya Rayya" | Tamil | Devi Sri Prasad | |
| 2013 | Theeya Velai Seiyyanum Kumaru | "Thiruttu Pasanga" | Tamil | C. Sathya | |
| 2013 | Baadshah | "Banthi Poola Janaki" | Telugu | S. Thaman | |
| 2013 | Kadali | "Yedike - jazz version" | Telugu | A. R. Rahman | Dubbed version of Kadal |
| 2013 | Iddarammayilatho | "Shankarabharanam Tho" | Telugu | Devi Sri Prasad | |
| 2013 | Balupu | "Patikella Chinnadi" | Telugu | S. Thaman | |
| 2013 | Mr. Pellikoduku | "Maatalu Raani" | Telugu | S. A. Rajkumar | |
| 2013 | Yevadu | "Pimple Dimple" | Telugu | Devi Sri Prasad | |
| 2014 | Marumugam | "Kathadi Kattukule" | Tamil | Agastya | |
| 2014 | Marumugam | "Nee Illatha Vazhkai" | Tamil | Praveen Savi | |
| 2014 | Billa Ranga | "Raja Raa" | Tamil | Santhosh Narayanan | |
| 2014 | Theriyama Unna Kadhalichitten | "Needhane Needhane" | Tamil | P. R. Srinath | |
| 2014 | Srimanthudu | "Rama Rama" | Telugu | Devi Sri Prasad | |
| 2015 | Kumari 21F | "Bang Bang Bangkok" | Telugu | Devi Sri Prasad | |
| 2015 | Demonte Colony | "Trap of the Beast" | Tamil | Keba Jeremiah | |
| 2015 | Ramleela | "Arey Sunny Leone" | Kannada | Anup Rubens | |
| 2016 | Gethu | "Thillu Mullu" | Tamil | Harris Jayaraj | |
| 2017 | Khaidi No. 150 | "Ammadu Let's Do Kummudu" | Telugu | Devi Sri Prasad | |
| 2017 | Jai Lava Kusa | "Tring Tring" | Telugu | Devi Sri Prasad | |
| 2018 | Tamizh Padam 2 | "Evada Unna Petha" | Tamil | N. Kannan | |
| 2018 | Junga | "Kootippo Koodave" | Tamil | Siddharth Vipin | |
| 2018 | Hello Guru Prema Kosame | "Hello Guru Prema Kosame" | Telugu | Devi Sri Prasad | |
| 2018 | Laila Majnu | "Aahista" | Hindi | Niladri Kumar | |
| 2019 | Vinaya Vidheya Rama | "Ek Baar" | Telugu | Devi Sri Prasad | |
| 2019 | Maharshi | "Choti Choti Baatein", | Telugu | Devi Sri Prasad | |
| 2019 | Maharshi | "Nuvve Samastham" | Telugu | Devi Sri Prasad | |
| 2020 | Sarileru Neekevvaru | "Mind Block" | Telugu | Devi Sri Prasad | |
| 2021 | Alludu Adhurs | "Hola Chica" | Telugu | Devi Sri Prasad | |
| 2021 | Aranmanai 3 | "Ratatapata" | Tamil | C. Sathya | |
| 2022 | Album Song | "Mannipu" | Tamil | Herself | |
| 2022 | Pistha | "Maatalu Raani" | Tamil | Dharan Kumar | |
| 2024 | Black | "En Chella Kedi" | Tamil | Sam C. S. | |
| 2024 | Rathnam | "Uyire En Uyire" | Tamil | Devi Sri Prasad | Co-singer: Kapil Kapilan, lyrics by Viveka |
| 2024 | Kanguva | "Yolo" | Tamil | Devi Sri Prasad | |
| 2024 | Kanguva | "Yolo" | Kannada | Devi Sri Prasad | Dubbed version |

== Filmography ==
| Year | Film | Role | Language |
|---|---|---|---|
| 2008 | Saroja | herself | Tamil |
