= 1: Nenokkadine =

2014 film directed by Sukumar

- Theatrical release poster
- Directed by: Sukumar
- Screenplay by: Jeremy Zimmerman
- Story by: Jakka Hariprasad
- Dialogue by: Arjun Y. K. Thota Srinivas
- Produced by: Ram Achanta; Gopichand Achanta; Anil Sunkara
- Starring: Mahesh Babu; Kriti Sanon
- Cinematography: R. Rathnavelu
- Edited by: Karthika Srinivas
- Music by: Devi Sri Prasad
- Production company: 14 Reels Entertainment
- Distributed by: Eros International
- Release date: 10 January 2014
- Running time: 177 minutes (theatrical version); 157 minutes (trimmed version)
- Country: India
- Language: Telugu
- Budget: ₹60–70 crore

1: Nenokkadine (transl. 1: I am alone) is a 2014 Indian Telugu-language psychological action thriller film directed by Sukumar. Produced by 14 Reels Entertainment and distributed by Eros International, the film stars Mahesh Babu in the lead role alongside Kriti Sanon (in her film debut), Nassar, Pradeep Rawat and Kelly Dorji. The story follows Gautham, a rock musician suffering from schizophrenia (Note: The film explains it as "integration disorder" while critics have noted that it is closer to schizophrenia. Director Sukumar explained that schizophrenia is perceived as an offensive term by most people and so he chose "integration disorder" as a more acceptable term. A psychiatrist had commented that features of post-traumatic stress disorder and schizophrenia were used to create the protagonist's character in the movie.) and missing 25 percent of his brain's grey matter, as he embarks on a quest to find his parents with the help of his girlfriend, Sameera, a journalist.

1: Nenokkadine features cinematography by R. Rathnavelu and editing by Karthika Srinivas. The music was composed by Devi Sri Prasad. Principal photography commenced in April 2012 and concluded in October 2013. Filming took place in various locations including London, Belfast, Bangkok, and Indian cities such as Hyderabad, Mumbai, Goa, Chennai, and Bangalore. Produced on a budget of ₹60–70 crore, it was the most expensive Telugu film at the time of its release.

1: Nenokkadine was released on 10 January 2014 across approximately 1,500 screens during the Sankranti festival season. The film received mixed reviews, with praise directed towards its music, cinematography, action sequences, and cast performances. However, the complexity of the screenplay and its length garnered criticism. The film eventually became a box office failure. It won three awards from eight nominations at the 4th SIIMA Awards and two awards at the 11th CineMAA Awards. Over time, the film was reevaluated and gained a cult following for its unique narrative, technical finesse and Babu's performance. It was also listed among Film Companion's "25 Greatest Telugu Films of the Decade."

== Plot ==
Gautham is a schizophrenic rock musician who is missing 25% of his grey matter. He hallucinates a mysterious person he believes is one of the three murderers of his parents. As a child, Gautham was convinced that he was an orphan and assumed that his parents were dead; he does not remember their names or what they looked like. At one of his concerts, Gautham sees one of the three men and chases him. Sameera, a journalist at the concert, films Gautham fighting his imaginary opponent. Gautham surrenders to the police after "killing" the man, confessing that he killed three men: one in Belfast, one in Pune, and one just now in Hyderabad. He is released from custody after Sameera broadcasts the video on television.

According to the psychiatrist, if Gautham can hallucinate a person other than the three men, he can be treated. Gautham goes to Goa on vacation. Sameera stalks him, convincing him that two people are stalking him: a journalist who wants to interview him (imaginary), and a person claiming to be his fan (real). Gautham begins to fall in love with Sameera. He saves her from a group of people trying to murder her; on an isolated island together, Gautham learns the truth behind the fourth imaginary person and writes Sameera off as a disturbed journalist. By the time he learns about Sameera's intentions, she has left for Hyderabad; Gautham pursues her. In Hyderabad, Gautham accidentally spoils Sameera's birthday plans, infuriating her.

Although he is convinced that he has made an enemy to cope with being an orphan, a mysterious person tries to kill Sameera, but Gautham saves her. Sameera learns that the mysterious person is Antonio Rosarius (one of the people behind Gautham's parents' death), a Goa-based crime boss who wants to kill her because she tried to expose the presence of hydrogen cyanide in seeds sold by Rosarius' company, AG1. Gautham meets Rosarius in the lobby of Sameera's office building. Assuming that he is an illusion, he shoots Rosarius dead. By the time Gautham realizes Rosarius is really dead, and learns that his parents were really murdered. He catches an aged taxi driver who was stalking him (another of the three men he imagined), and discovers that Rosarius, along with an NRI in London, killed his parents; his father gave a bag to the taxi driver to deliver to Gautham.

In the bag is an old Rubik's Cube, a key, and a British coin. Gautham and Sameera leave for London, where they and their driver, Gulaab Singh, escape from a murder attempt; Gautham's manager, Michael, is killed. The Rubik's Cube, when solved a certain way, reveals a safe deposit box number in which Gautham finds a preserved rice sample. After escaping another murder attempt in a parking lot, he eludes the police and the two men with Sameera and Singh's help. One of the men, a fan, seeks revenge for his father (one of the other murderers, according to the aged taxi driver), who was killed by Gautham in Belfast when he performed there. Gautham learns that the aged taxi driver he met previously is a businessman and the murderer; the person hit by the businessman's car in Gautham's presence was the actual, innocent taxi driver.

Gautham and the businessman confront each other. The businessman reveals that he and Gautham's father were also successful businessmen. Gautham's father and the businessman were best friends and worked in the same company, Sinto 1. They worked on cultivating Golden rice, a variety that could grow in any weather. When Gautham's father refused to sell it in favor of distributing it globally for free, the businessman and Rosarios killed his parents. When he refuses to tell Gautham about his parents, Gautham kills him. On his way to the airport, Gautham passes the school he had attended in his childhood and hears children singing a rhyme. It reminds him of a similar rhyme he learnt from his mother, and he remembers his way back to his house. At his house (a dilapidated villa), Gautham finds a photo of his parents, Chandrasekhar and Kalyani. He later introduces the rice variety at a global convention as "the second green revolution", and the film ends with Gautham standing in his field of golden rice.

== Cast ==
- Mahesh Babu as Gautham / Gautham Chandrashekhar
  - Gautham Krishna as young Gautham
- Kriti Sanon as Sameera, Gautham's girlfriend
- Nassar as an unnamed businessman, Chandrashekar's friend
- Pradeep Rawat as Taxi Driver
- Sayaji Shinde as Inspector Jaan Baasha
- Kelly Dorji as Antonio Rosarius
- Posani Krishna Murali as Gulaab Singh
- Anand as entrepreneur Chandrashekhar, Gautham's father
- Anu Hasan as Kalyani, Gautham's mother
- John Kokken as Antonio Rosarius' henchman
- Banerjee as Sameera's boss
- Vikram Singh as Antonio Rosarius' henchman
- Ravi Varma as Michael
- Surya as Gautham's doctor
- Srinivasa Reddy as Constable K. S. Reddy
- Narsing Yadav as bus driver
- Kadambari Kiran Kumar as bus conductor
- Naveen Polishetty as Naveen, the taxi driver's son
- Amit Tiwari as the businessman's henchman
- Sophie Choudry in the item number "London Babu"

== Production ==
=== Development ===
After completing 100% Love (2011), Sukumar began working on a psychological thriller with Mahesh Babu in mind as the protagonist because he felt that Babu had universal appeal. Babu met Sukumar on the set of Businessman (2012) in Goa, and listened to the script for 25 minutes. Although Sukumar could not describe the story well in the noisy restaurant, Babu agreed to appear in the film within half an hour. Sukumar worked on 1: Nenokkadine's script for two months, and considered it his dream project.

Ram Achanta, Gopichand Achanta and Anil Sunkara of 14 Reels Entertainment, who produced Babu's Dookudu (2011) and Aagadu (2014), agreed to produce 1: Nenokkadine after hearing the script. Asked about his frequent collaboration with them, Babu said that Sukumar clearly indicated the risk of budget escalation and longer production and said that he and Sukumar could be viewed as criminals if it was produced by someone else. Sunil Lulla and Andrew Hefferman were credited as co-producers, and Koti Paruchuri was its executive producer. The film, introduced on 12 February 2012 in Hyderabad, received its title in May 2013.

=== Casting ===
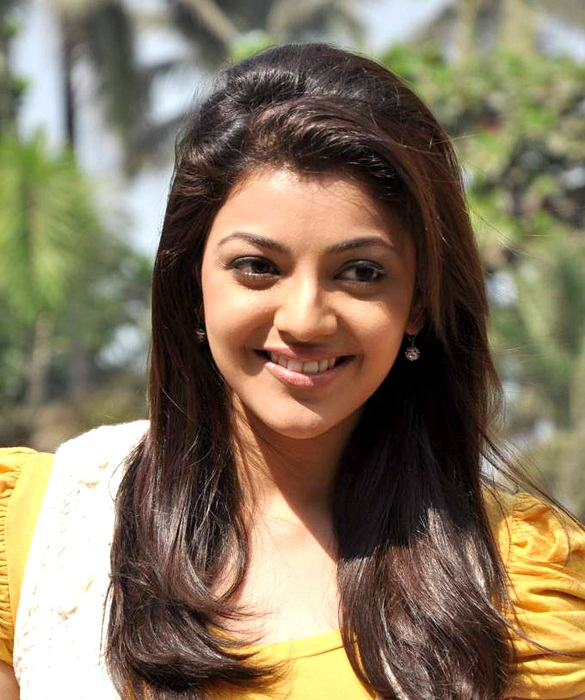
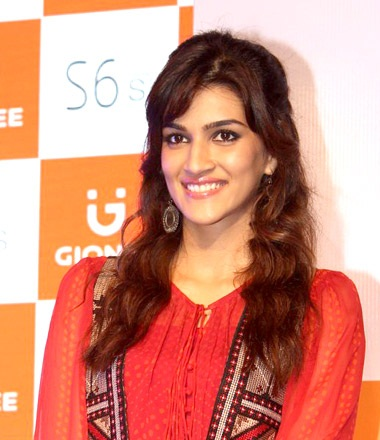
Kajal Aggarwal (left) was initially signed as the female lead, but was replaced by Kriti Sanon (right) due to scheduling problems. 1: Nenokkadine was Sanon's debut.

Babu agreed to be fit and healthy, since the film emphasised action scenes. He followed a 12-week Dynamic Transformation Plan (DTP) supervised by Kris Gethin, developing his abdominal muscles and losing weight. Babu then followed a Yoda Three Training regime (Y3T), supervised by Neil Hill, further developing his muscles. His stylist, Ashwin Malwe, said that his appearance and style would be "sophisticated and classy" in the film. Sukumar had Babu wear eyeglasses, since the director felt that audiences tended to consider a bespectacled character to be perfectionistic and positive, and the actor's hairstyle was changed.

Tamannaah was considered for the female lead, since the producers were impressed with her performance in 100% Love. She declined the offer, citing scheduling conflicts, and the Producer's Council told her not to sign for any new films until she completed her current assignments. After auditioning two actresses, Sukumar chose Kajal Aggarwal in March 2012 as the female lead. She was replaced by Kriti Sanon in October 2012, due to scheduling conflicts. Sanon was signed for Heropanti (2014) after completing one shooting schedule for 1: Nenokkadine, and divided her time between the films. Sanon, who was involved in several action scenes filmed on the sea, was apprehensive about a scene in which Babu took her from a yacht since she did not know how to swim.

Babu's seven-year-old son, Gautham Krishna, was chosen to play the younger version of the protagonist in his Telugu cinema debut. According to Sukumar, Gautham looked like the actor did as a child. When the director approached Babu and his wife, Namrata Shirodkar, Gautham Krishna was only six and they were apprehensive. His introduction scene was filmed silently by Peter Hein, since the boy was afraid of gunfire. Nassar, Pradeep Rawat, Kelly Dorji, Sayaji Shinde and Anu Hasan and Vikram Singh were cast in other supporting roles. Naveen Polishetty played a supporting role as the son of Pradeep Rawat's character in the film.

Jacqueline Fernandez was approached to perform an item number in the film, but the producers failed to make a deal and instead signed Sophie Choudry after seeing her performance in "Aala Re Aala" from Shootout at Wadala (2013). For her first Telugu song, Choudry joined the film's set in September 2013. Sukumar said about the item number, "It's a superstar's film and it should reach all. Item numbers are common these days, and people expect to see them. The situation was that Babu had to go to a pub to get information about the person he was looking for. So there was an occasion to put in an item number".

=== Crew ===
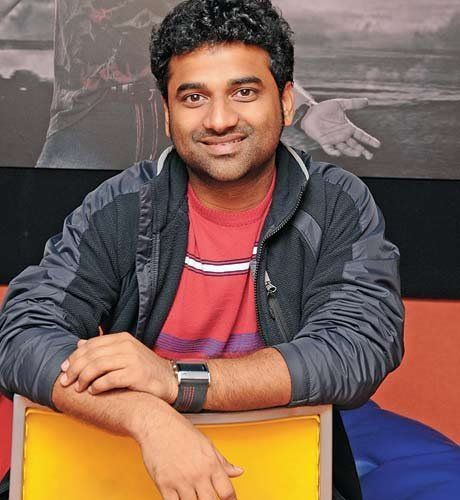
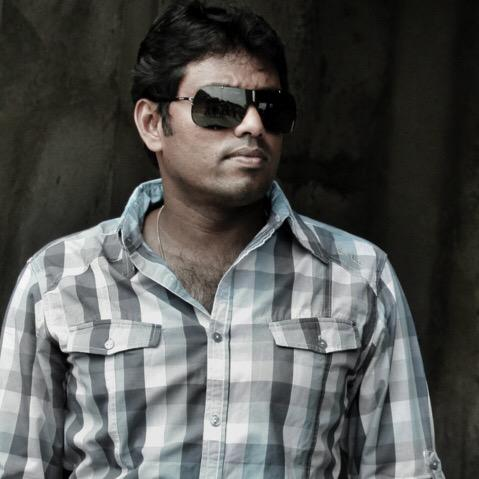
Devi Sri Prasad (left) and R. Rathnavelu (right) were signed as the music composer and director of photography. Rathnavelu, who returned to Telugu cinema after a seven-year absence, compared the film's aesthetic challenges to Enthiran (2010).

R. Rathnavelu, who collaborated with Sukumar on Arya (2004) and Jagadam (2007), was the film's director of photography in his return to Telugu cinema after seven years. Rathnavelu called the film "more challenging aesthetically" and compared it to Enthiran (2010), which he considered his technically toughest film. He created the film's visual style in a week with a variety of cameras, such as Red Epic, Body Rigs, Doggies and an underwater scuba camera. For the climaxes, Rathnavelu shifted from chrome to black-and-white to full colour in synchronisation with the story's mood.

Rathnavelu had to address the protagonist's mood swings and hallucinations, replicating scenes with minor differences. The film was shot in locations with a variety of climates, and new technical crews were hired in those places. Sukumar said, "We looked at world technicians and saw their work and can use whatever we learnt" and called it a "new yet learning experience" [sic].

Sukumar's usual composer, Devi Sri Prasad, was chosen for the film's soundtrack and score in Prasad's first Babu film. He went through the script and discussed it with Sukumar, who felt that Prasad translated his vision in the background score. Prasad finished re-recording the film's second half in four days. Eleven-year-old journalist Smrithika Thuhina's father was an associate director of the film, and Prasad emailed him the rhyme's tune with several stills from the scene; his daughter wrote the lyrics for the rhyme. P. Madhusudhan Reddy was the film's audiographer.

Peter Hein choreographed 1: Nenokkadine's action sequences, and Prem Rakshith choreographed its songs. Jakka Hari Prasad and Palnati Surya Pratap worked on the film's story, and Y. K. Arjun, Thota Srinivas and Potluri Venkateswara Rao developed the script. Jeremy Zimmerman was credited with the screenplay, assisted by Sunil Madhav. V. Srinivas Mohan was 1: Nenokkadine's visual-effects producer and R. C. Kamalakannan and Adel Adili's visual-effects company, Makuta, worked on the film. Karthika Srinivas was its chief editor, assisted by Siva Saravanan.

=== Filming ===
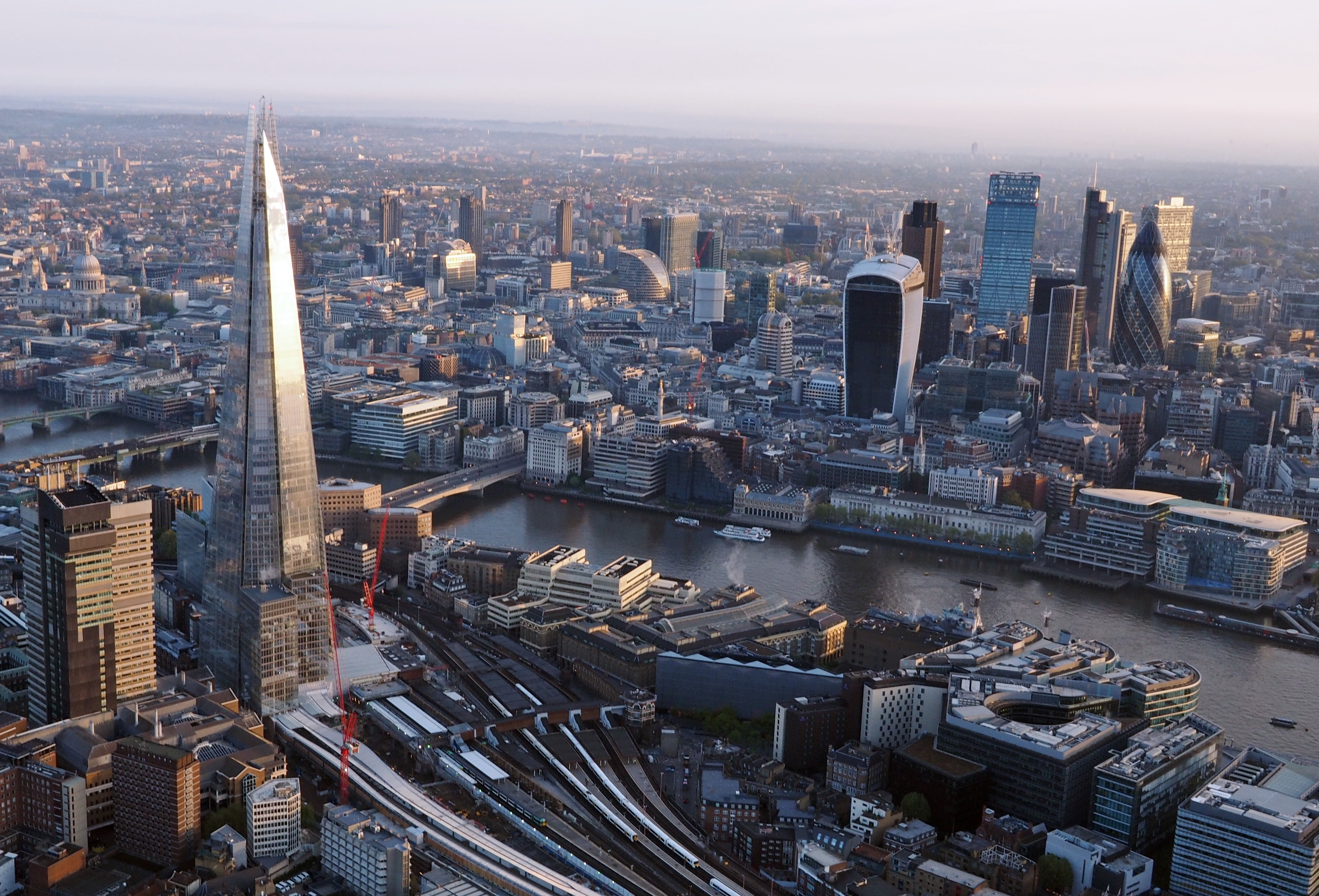
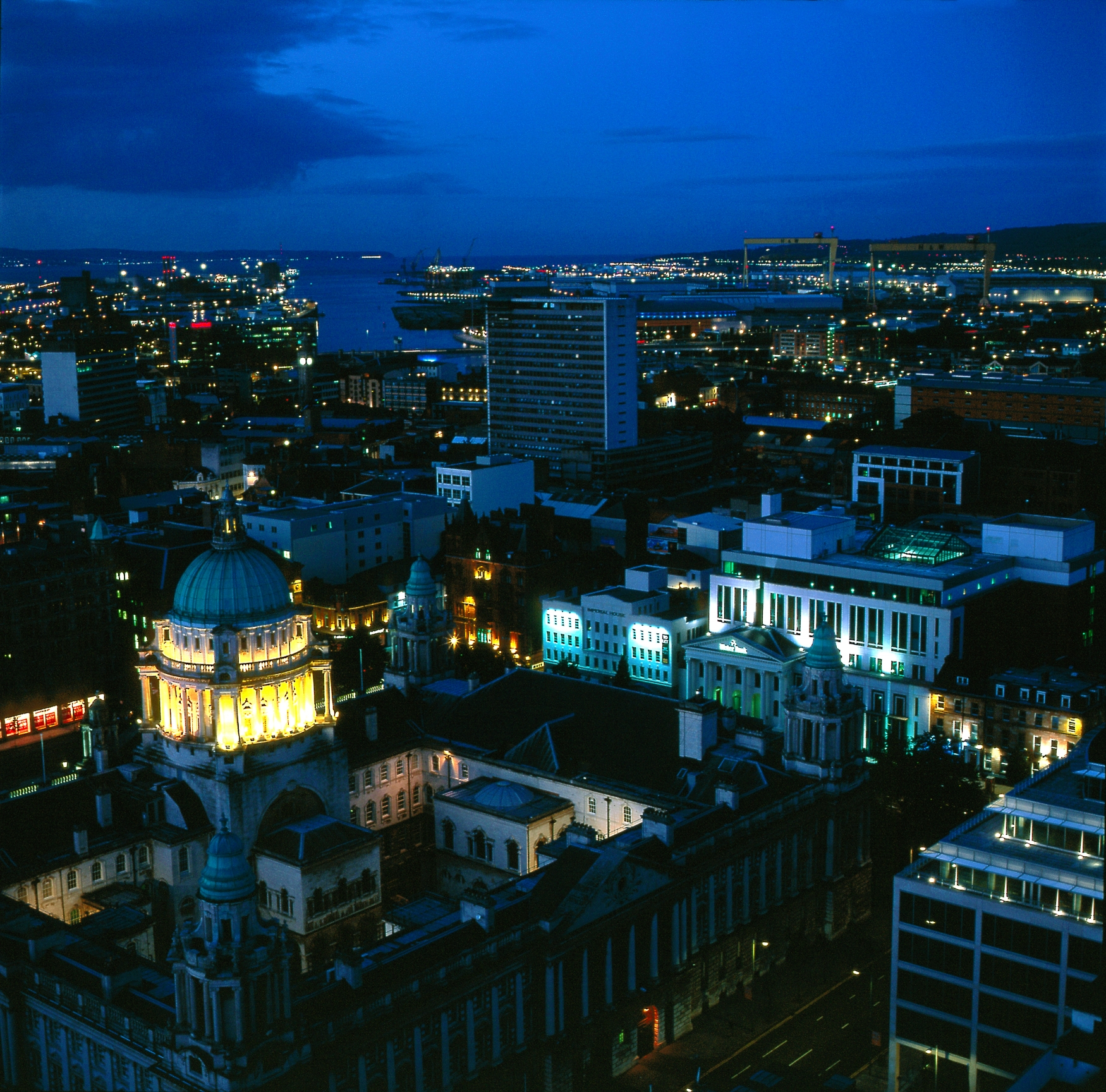
1: Nenokkadine, filmed in London (top) and Belfast (bottom) for 60 days, is the first Telugu film to be shot in Belfast.

Principal photography began on 23 April 2012, with the filming of "Who R U?" featuring Babu and Aggarwal supervised by Prem Rakshith on a set at Annapurna Studios in Hyderabad. Six hundred models performed in the song, and about 2,000 people participated in the shoot. After its completion, an action sequence was filmed. The first shooting schedule wrapped up, and Babu returned to the set of Seethamma Vakitlo Sirimalle Chettu (2013). The second schedule began on 31 May 2012 on house and colony sets at Saradhi Studios in Hyderabad, including scenes with Babu and others. Scenes of Babu at the police station were also part of the schedule.

Since the actor had allotted a block of time to Seethamma Vakitlo Sirimalle Chettu, 1: Nenokkadine's filming was delayed. When the former neared completion, he resumed work on 1: Nenokkadine in late September 2012 in Hyderabad. Filming continued in Goa in mid-October, after a four-month hiatus, and a song with Babu and others was filmed in late October. The Goa schedule wrapped up on 1 November, with half the filming completed. Babu took a break to promote Seethamma Vakitlo Sirimalle Chettu, returning to the set on 23 January 2013. The next shooting schedule, which began on 18 March, lasted for three weeks. Night scenes focusing on Babu and others were filmed in Kukatpally in mid-April.

The next schedule, which began on 18 June, filmed in London and Belfast for 60 days. At the Causeway Pictures studio in Northern Ireland, 1: Nenokkadine was the first Telugu film shot in Belfast. Hollywood stunt co-ordinator Conrad Palmisano supervised stunts by Babu and others. Rathnavelu called the action scene in a London car park "one of the most satisfying" things he had ever done. The scene takes place during a power failure, with the headlights of motorcycles chasing the protagonist the only sources of light. To film the scene, Rathnavelu used LED lamps and three torchlights; smoke was pumped into the air to create a backdrop. When scenes were filmed on one of London's three main bridges, traffic was stopped on both sides of the bridge for more than eight hours.

After London, filming continued in Bangkok in August 2013 and in Hyderabad in September; some scenes were filmed in and near Banjara Hills. The last shooting schedule began in Bangkok in early October 2013, with action scenes supervised by Peter Hein. The remaining dialogue scenes were filmed in Bangalore in mid-October 2013. They were finished by late November, and the last song was filmed in Mumbai. Principal photography wrapped in late December 2013.

== Music ==
The film's five-song soundtrack was composed by Sukumar's usual collaborator Devi Sri Prasad, with lyrics by Chandrabose. Lahari Music acquired its marketing rights for ₹1 crore, which is a record for a Telugu film. The soundtrack album was released on 21 December 2013 with a promotional event at Shilpakala Vedika in Hyderabad. The event, watched by 14,500 people, was shown live in 24 theatres across Andhra Pradesh and Telangana and was the first Indian soundtrack release event shown live in theatres. The audio received a positive response from critics.

== Release ==
1: Nenokkadine was released globally on 10 January 2014 on about 1,500 screens, around the same time as Yevadu (which was released two days later). The film was Babu's third consecutive release during the Makar Sankranti festival season, following Businessman in 2012 and Seethamma Vakitlo Sirimalle Chettu in 2013. Eros International acquired its global distribution rights for ₹72 crore, and it was released and distributed by 14 Reels Entertainment. 1: Nenokkadine was released on 900 screens across Andhra Pradesh and Telangana. Including multiplexes, 108 screens were booked in Hyderabad and there were 600 screenings on the film's release day. It broke the record held by Attarintiki Daredi (2013), which had been released on 100 screens in Hyderabad. 14 Reels Entertainment released the film in Auro 11.1 cinema audio format, supported by Barco.

Karnataka distribution rights were sold to RNR Films, who had distributed Dookudu in the state, for ₹45 crore. 1: Nenokkadine was released on about 200 screens overseas, a record for a Telugu film. In addition to the United States and the United Kingdom, the film was released in Australia, the Netherlands, Switzerland, Malaysia and Germany; it was the first Telugu film released in Ukraine. When reaction to the film's length was mixed, the producers reduced its running time from 169 to 149 minutes. The film was dubbed in Hindi as 1: Ek Ka Dum.

=== Marketing ===
A mobile app was released on 27 November 2013 on Google Play, and later on iOS; 1: Nenokkadine's first look, posters, video promos and other promotional material were released through the app. On 21 December 2013, users could download the film's soundtrack and purchase bulk pre-release tickets. Its digital-media marketing was handled by Sharath Chandra, Anurag and Rohita of First Show Digital. The digital campaign placed third at the 2014 Indian Digital Media Awards in Mumbai, surpassing that for Krrish 3. It accounted for 15 percent of total promotional activity, influencing the sale of 7,500 tickets on the film's release day. 1: Nenokkadine's YouTube channel had 12 million views; on Facebook its page received 130 million views, reaching 40 million users and engaging 3.9 million people.

The film's audio teaser was released on 17 December 2013, a few days before the audio launch. The theatrical trailer of the movie was released on 25 December 2013. South Indian actress Samantha Ruth Prabhu found a poster of Sanon crawling behind Babu "regressive", triggering a backlash on Facebook and Twitter from Babu's fans. Actor Siddharth and filmmaker Sekhar Kammula shared her view, receiving a similar response, and filmmaker Pritish Nandy said that the poster was "gross" and "regressive". Sukumar later removed that sequence from the film to avoid further issues, although the Central Board of Film Certification did not object to its inclusion.

=== Home media ===
1: Nenokkadine had its global television premiere on 8 June 2014 on Gemini TV, with a TRP rating of 7.32.

== Reception ==
=== Critical response ===
The movie received generally mixed reviews from critics. According to The New Indian Express, its audience was "gripped through the whole film, but not for the right reasons": "Ending with a heralding of a second 'Green Revolution' and carrying on a legacy that aims at a food Utopia, you wish the movie continued with the schizophrenia and ended in an asylum". Karthik Pasupulate of The Times of India gave the film three out of five stars: "The [Telugu cinema] format of six songs, five fights and loads of entertainment and melodrama makes it impossible to respectably adapt racy Hollywood styled suspense thrillers". Radhika Rajamani of Rediff called the film "inordinately long, with repetitive scenes and slow and sluggish narration", and a "sense of ennui set in after a point"; however, Rajamani praised the lead actors' performances. Sify gave the film 2.75 out of five stars: "In 1 Nenokkadine, individual sequences are cool but the same cannot be said if we see it in totality. Apart from Mahesh Babu's stunning performance, the drive of the film is completely off the track. It disappoints." Suresh Kavirayani of Deccan Chronicle gave the film 2.5 out of five stars: "To say it in a line, the film falls short of expectations and disappoints film goers, especially the fans of Mahesh Babu". Kavirayani called Rathnavelu's cinematography its "saving grace", praising the lead pair's performances.

Sangeetha Devi Dundoo of The Hindu wrote, "How often do we get to watch a Telugu film where the audience, along with the protagonist and supporting characters, is also required to think and distinguish between events unfolding in real and imaginary spaces?" and called 1 Nenokkadine a "visually stunning" film. Sridhar Vivan of Bangalore Mirror gave the film 3.5 out of five stars: "As the film tries out a refined or reformed revenge saga, it needs to be seen whether 1 Nenokkadine works at the box office. If it does, it is a good sign for Telugu cinema". A. S. Sashidhar of The Times of India wrote, "The first half of 1: Nenokkadine is good and will keep you wanting for more. The story has a few interesting twists and turns, in the second half too to keep the audience glued to the screen", and Sukumar "should be commended for superb attempt in choosing to make a film that has not been explored in Telugu movies".

=== Accolades ===
Ceremony	Category	Nominee	Result	Ref.
62nd Filmfare Awards South	Filmfare Award for Best Female Playback Singer – Telugu	Neha Bhasin (for "Aww Tuzo Mogh Korta")	Nominated	
4th South Indian International Movie Awards	SIIMA Award for Best Actor (Telugu)	Mahesh Babu	Nominated	
4th South Indian International Movie Awards	SIIMA Award for Best Cinematographer (Telugu)	R. Rathnavelu	Won	
4th South Indian International Movie Awards	Best Dance Choreographer – Telugu	Prem Rakshith (for "You're My Love")	Nominated	
4th South Indian International Movie Awards	Best Fight Choreographer – Telugu	Peter Hein	Won	
4th South Indian International Movie Awards	Best Music Director (Telugu)	Devi Sri Prasad	Nominated	
4th South Indian International Movie Awards	Best Male Playback Singer (Telugu)	Devi Sri Prasad (for "Who R U?")	Nominated	
4th South Indian International Movie Awards	Best Female Playback Singer (Telugu)	Neha Bhasin (for "Aww Tuzo Mogh Korta")	Won	
4th South Indian International Movie Awards	Best Female Debut (Telugu)	Kriti Sanon	Nominated	
11th CineMAA Awards	Best Actor (Jury)	Mahesh Babu	Won	
11th CineMAA Awards	Special Music Award	Devi Sri Prasad	Won	
13th Santosham Film Awards	Big FM Music Award	Devi Sri Prasad	Won	
