= SIIMA Award for Best Cinematographer – Telugu =

Award

- Awarded for: Best Cinematography Achievement in Telugu cinema
- Country: India
- Presented by: Vibri Media Group
- First award: 21 June 2012 (for films released in 2011)
- Most recent winner: Karthik Gattamneni, Mirai (2025)

Highlights
- Most wins: K. K. Senthil Kumar and R. Rathnavelu (4)
- Most nominations: R. Rathnavelu (5)

SIIMA Award for Best Cinematographer – Telugu is presented by Vibri media group as part of its annual South Indian International Movie Awards, for the best cinematography done by a person in Telugu films. The award was first given in 2012 for films released in 2011.

== Winners ==
| Year | Cinematographer | Film | Ref |
|---|---|---|---|
| 2011 | P. R. K. Raju | Sri Rama Rajyam | |
| 2012 | K. K. Senthil Kumar | Eega | |
| 2013 | Prasad Murella | Attarintiki Daredi | |
| 2014 | R. Rathnavelu | 1: Nenokkadine | |
| 2015 | K. K. Senthil Kumar | Baahubali: The Beginning | |
| 2016 | No Award | | |
| 2017 | K. K. Senthil Kumar | Baahubali 2: The Conclusion | |
| 2018 | R. Rathnavelu | Rangasthalam | |
| 2019 | Sanu Varghese | Jersey | |
| 2020 | R. Rathnavelu | Sarileru Neekevvaru | |
| 2021 | C. Ram Prasad | Akhanda | |
| 2022 | K. K. Senthil Kumar | RRR | |
| 2023 | Bhuvan Gowda | Salaar: Part 1 – Ceasefire | |
| 2024 | R. Rathnavelu | Devara: Part 1 | |
| 2025 | Karthik Gattamneni | Mirai | |

== Nominations ==
- 2011: P. R. K. Raju – Sri Rama Rajyam
  - Vijay K. Chakravarthy – Mr. Perfect
  - Venkat R. Prasad – 100% Love
  - K. V. Guhan – Dookudu
  - Soundararajan – Anaganaga O Dheerudu
- 2012: K. K. Senthil Kumar – Eega
  - Shyam K. Naidu – Businessman
  - Jayanan Vincent – Gabbar Singh
  - P. C. Sreeram – Ishq
  - Chota K. Naidu – Dhamarukam
- 2013: Prasad Murella – Attarintiki Daredi
  - Chota K. Naidu – Naayak
  - K. V. Guhan – Seethamma Vakitlo Sirimalle Chettu
  - R. Madhi – Mirchi
  - Amol Rathod – Iddarammayilatho
- 2014: R. Rathnavelu – 1: Nenokkadine
  - Karthik Gattamneni – Karthikeya
  - P. S. Vinod – Manam
  - Manoj Paramahamsa – Race Gurram
  - R. Madhi – Run Raja Run
- 2015: K. K. Senthil Kumar – Baahubali: The Beginning
- 2017: K. K. Senthil Kumar – Baahubali 2: The Conclusion
- 2018: R. Rathnavelu – Rangasthalam
  - Dani Sanchez-Lopez – Mahanati
  - George C Williams – Tholi Prema
  - Jaya Krishna Gummadi – Padi Padi Leche Manasu
  - Shaneil Deo – Goodachari
- 2019: Sanu Varghese – Jersey
  - R. Rathnavelu – Sye Raa Narasimha Reddy
  - K. U. Mohanan – Maharshi
  - Raj Thota – ISmart Shankar
  - R. Madhi – Saaho
- 2020: R. Rathnavelu – Sarileru Neekevvaru
  - P. S. Vinod – Ala Vaikunthapurramuloo
  - P. G. Vinda – V
  - Venkat C. Dilip – Solo Brathuke So Better
  - Sai Sriram – Bheeshma
- 2021: C. Ram Prasad – Akhanda
  - Miroslaw Kuba Brozek – Pushpa: The Rise
  - G. K. Vishnu – Krack
  - Siddam Manohar – Jathi Ratnalu
  - Shamdat – Uppena
  - Shyam K. Naidu – Narappa
- 2022: K. K. Senthil Kumar – RRR
  - Chota K. Naidu – Bimbisara
  - Karthik Gattamneni – Karthikeya 2
  - P. S. Vinod – Sita Ramam
  - Vamsi Patchipulusu – Major
- 2023: Bhuvan Gowda – Salaar: Part 1 – Ceasefire
  - Dasaradhi Sivendra – Mangalavaaram
  - Rajeev Dharavath – Month of Madhu
  - Sathyan Sooryan – Dasara
  - Shamdat – Virupaksha
- 2024: R. Rathnavelu – Devara: Part 1
  - Daniel Viswas, Sateesh Reddy Masam – KA
  - Dasaradhi Sivendra – Hanu-Man
  - Djordje Stojiljkovic – Kalki 2898 AD
  - Mirosław Kuba Brożek – Pushpa 2: The Rule
- 2025: Karthik Gattamneni – Mirai
  - Jomon T. John and Girish Gangadharan – Kingdom
  - Sanu Varghese – HIT: The Third Case
  - Shamdat – Thandel
  - Vijay Kartik Kannan – Daaku Maharaaj
