= Current (2009 film) =

- Directed by: Palnati Surya Pratap
- Written by: Srinivasa Rao Chinthalapudi
- Screenplay by: Palnati Surya Pratap
- Starring: Sushanth; Sneha Ullal
- Cinematography: Vijay C. Kumar
- Edited by: Marthand K. Venkatesh
- Music by: Devi Sri Prasad
- Release date: 19 June 2009
- Running time: 137 minutes
- Country: India
- Language: Telugu

Current is a 2009 Indian Telugu language romantic comedy film directed by Palnati Surya Pratap. It stars Sushanth and Sneha Ullal in the lead roles. Devi Sri Prasad provided the music while Vijay Kumar C. provided the cinematography. Marthand K. Venkatesh handled the editing department.

== Plot ==
Sushanth (Sushanth) is a happy-go-lucky college student whose philosophy of life is summed up as Forget Yesterday, Enjoy Today & Worry Not about Tomorrow which keeps him happy but worries his parents to no end. A transfer brings the entire family to Hyderabad where he falls for his college classmate Sneha (Sneha Ullal) on day one. A determined Sushanth woos her successfully. Now, Sneha's philosophy of life runs totally opposite of Sushanth and very soon reality sets in. His attitude ruins his marriage prospects with Sneha and they end up separating. The second half of the movie is all about how they try to fall out of love while making compromises to their philosophies. It ends well with both accepting that Love is above everything else in life.

== Cast ==
- Sushanth as Sushanth
- Sneha Ullal as Sneha
- Raghu Babu as Guava seller
- Tanikella Bharani as Sushanth's father
- Brahmanandam as Sushanth's uncle
- Vennela Kishore as Bose
- Rashmi Gautam as Geeta
- Jhansi as Sneha's aunt
- Shankar Melkote
- Charan Raj as Sneha's father
- Telangana Shakuntala as Sweeper Swarnakka
- Shafi as Shafi
- Sudha as Sushanth's mother
- Kondavalasa Lakshmana Rao as Sneha's father's PA
- Shakeela as brothel owner
- Prudhviraj as Police Officer
- Vijay Sai as Giri
- Satyam Rajesh
- Ravi Prakash
- Srinivasa Reddy

== Soundtrack ==
Current

Soundtrack album by Devi Sri Prasad
- Released: 9 June 2009
- Recorded: 2009
- Genre: Feature film soundtrack
- Language: Telugu
- Label: Aditya Music
- Producer: Devi Sri Prasad

Devi Sri Prasad chronology
Villu (2009)	Current (2009)	Kanthaswamy (2009)

The audio was Launched on 9 June 2009. The special guests for the launch were Nagarjuna, Seenu Vytla and Sekhar Kammula along with Palnati Surya Pratap, Chintalapuri Srinivasa Rao, Devi Sri Prasad, Bhaskarabhatla Ravi Kumar and Ramajogaiah Sastri. The soundtrack was received well.

Tracklist
No.	Title	Lyrics	Singer(s)	Length
1.	"You Are My Love Story"	Bhaskarabhatla	Devi Sri Prasad
2.	"Rekkalu"	Bhaskarabhatla	Sagar & Ranina Reddy
3.	"Ammayilu Abbayilu"	Ramajogayya Sastry	Franco & Andrea Jeremiah
4.	"Current"	Ramajogayya Sastry	Benny Dayal
5.	"Atu Nuvve Itu Nuvve"	Ramajogayya Sastry	Neha Bhasin
