= Gandhi Tatha Chettu =

2024 Indian Telugu-language film by Padmavathi Malladi

- Theatrical release poster
- Directed by: Padmavathi Malladi
- Written by: Padmavathi Malladi
- Produced by: Naveen Yerneni; Yalamanchili Ravi Shankar; Sesha Sindhu Rao
- Starring: Sukriti Veni; Ananda Chakrapani; Rag Mayur; Bhanu Prakash
- Cinematography: Vishwa Devabattula; Srijitha Cheruvupally
- Edited by: Hari Shankar TN
- Music by: Ree
- Production companies: Mythri Movie Makers; Sukumar Writings; Gopi Talkies
- Release dates: November 2024 (Listapad); 24 January 2025 (India)
- Running time: 114 minutes
- Country: India
- Language: Telugu

Gandhi Tatha Chettu (transl. Grandpa Gandhi's Tree) is a 2024 Indian Telugu-language drama film written and directed by Padmavathi Malladi. The film features Sukriti Veni Bandreddi, Chakrapani Ananda and Rag Mayur in lead roles.

The film premiered at Minsk International Film Festival (Listapad) in November 2024 and at Jaipur International Film Festival during the same month. It was released in movie theaters on 24 January 2025.

== Plot ==
The film tells the story of a 13-year-old girl named Gandhi, who is deeply influenced by her grandfather Ramachandrayya's adherence to Mahatma Gandhi's principles. When a spokesperson for a minister, Satish, attempts to persuade the villagers to sell their land for the construction of a chemical factory, Ramachandrayya refuses, valuing a cherished tree on his property. After his passing, Gandhi takes on the responsibility of protecting the tree and faces opposition from the villagers and Satish. The narrative follows her non-violent struggle to save the tree, embodying Gandhian ideals of peaceful resistance.

== Cast ==
- Sukriti Veni as Gandhi
- Ananda Chakrapani as Ramachandrayya, Gandhi's grandfather
- Rag Mayur as Satish
- Bhanu Prakash
- Nehal Anand Kunkuma
- Raghu Ram

== Soundtrack ==
All music is composed by Ree.

No.	Title	Lyrics	Singer(s)	Length
1.	"Uthuthi"	Suddala Ashok Teja	Kanakavva	2:56
2.	"Dhagad Pilla"	Kasarla Shyam	Rahul Sipligunj	3:02
3.	"Ole Sandhamama"	Kasarla Shyam	Divya Maalika	1:24
4.	"Gandhi Maate"	Viswa	Meghanaa Naidu, Sindhuja Tanuku, Swetha Ponnapalli, Krishna Lasya, Sweeya Lakshmi, Gopika	2:57

== Release ==
Gandhi Tatha Chettu premiered at Minsk International Film Festival (Listapad) in November 2024 and other film festivals. It was later released in movie theaters on 24 January 2025. It was released on Amazon Prime Video and ETV Win on 21 March 2025.

== Reception ==
Sangeetha Devi Dundoo of The Hindu gave a positive review with appreciation for direction and, performances of lead cast. BH Harsh of The New Indian Express rated the film 3 out of 5 and wrote that "Gandhi Tatha Chettu accomplishes just that, leaving us emotional with its simplicity and wholesomeness" with a particular praise for the actor Ananda Chakrapani. The Times of India too gave the same rating and stated, "while its slow-burn approach requires patience, the moral takeaway and artistic execution make it worthwhile".
