= Kumari 21F =

2015 film by Palnati Surya Pratap

- Theatrical release poster
- Directed by: Palnati Surya Pratap
- Written by: Sukumar
- Produced by: Bandreddi Vijay Prasad; Thomas Reddy Aduri
- Starring: Raj Tarun; Hebah Patel
- Cinematography: R. Rathnavelu
- Edited by: Amar Reddy
- Music by: Devi Sri Prasad
- Production companies: Sukumar Writings; P. A. Motion Pictures
- Release date: 20 November 2015
- Running time: 135 minutes
- Country: India
- Language: Telugu
- Budget: ₹6–15 crore (Note: Film historian Rentala Jayadeva estimates the film's budget as ₹6 crore. Sify estimates the film's budget as ₹9 crore,)

Kumari 21F is a 2015 Indian Telugu-language romantic drama film written by Sukumar and directed by Palnati Surya Pratap. Produced by Bandreddi Vijay Prasad, the film stars Raj Tarun and Hebah Patel. Kumari 21F focuses on a romantic relationship between Siddhu, a chef and Kumari, a struggling model.

The film marks the debut of Sukumar, a director and screenwriter in Telugu cinema, as a producer. The film was produced on a budget of ₹6–15 crore. Sukumar took inspiration from his youthful college days in Razole, where a young woman went to a picnic with some young men; a major undertaking for a woman at that time, which earned her the undeserved label of a "loose" character.

Devi Sri Prasad composed the film's background score and music and R. Rathnavelu was the director of photography. Neither Prasad nor Rathnavelu charged any remuneration for the film. Principal photography commenced in December 2014 and was finished in 70 working days; according to Rathnavelu, lighting played a key role during the filming process and digital low lighting photography techniques were used.

Kumari 21F was released worldwide in theatres on 19 November 2015 in about 500 screens. It received mostly positive critical response; praise was directed towards the film's climax, performances (especially Hebah Patel), screenplay, cinematography and music. The film grossed ₹38 crore and earned a distributor share of ₹18 crore at the end of its run. It was declared a commercial success based on the return on distributor's investment of ₹10 crore and became the twelfth highest grossing Telugu film of the year. The film was remade in Kannada language with the same title and released in 2018. The movie was reported to be loosely inspired by the 2004 French film Lila Says.

== Plot ==
Siddhu is a chef leading a middle class life with his mother in K.G.B. colony. His father Ravikanth is accused of having an extra-marital affair that leads to the separation of his parents. Siddhu aims to be a chef on a cruise liner in Singapore and his financial status does not support him. His friends Shankar, Srinu and Suresh steal money from people who use the local ATM; they hide in some local ruins for three days and Siddhu cooks for them and provides liquor, receiving a share of the money in return.

Siddhu meets Kumari, a struggling model from Mumbai who has recently moved to the colony. They fall in love; Siddhu is often confused by Kumari's bold and daring attitude. His friends tell Siddhu is not Kumari's first boyfriend and she may have had past relationships. Siddhu grows suspicious about her virginity and Kumari realises this. She rejects his marriage proposal, saying he does not have the maturity to love her.

Siddhu tries to make Kumari jealous by romancing his neighbour Madhu, but his ploy fails. Kumari continues to love him unconditionally; her attitude confuses Siddhu. Siddhu's friends discover Kumari is actually Meena, a Mumbai-based model who was caught in a police raid at a brothel. She rejects their sexual advances, which angers them. Siddhu refuses to leave her, further angering the trio.

After an ATM robbery, the trio escapes and Srinu loses his cellphone; Kumari finds it and hands it to the police. The trio shelter in the ruins; when Siddhu meets them, Shankar reveals that Kumari is actually Meena and shares a video of a press meet issued by the Mumbai police that features her and others linked to a prostitution case. Kumari rejects Siddhu's advances that night; the following day, he discovers his father never had an extra-marital relationship and his mother misunderstood. To make sure Siddhu is happy, Kumari asks him to visit her that night to fulfill his desire.

The trio reach Kumari's house before Siddhu, sedate her with narcotics mixed with juice, and sexually assault her. Siddu arrives and finds the trio there. After chasing them away, he reads Kumari's letter that makes him recognise his immaturity. He starts rearranging everything to make sure Kumari is not aware of the assault. He sees blood stains on her saree and assumes she is a virgin. He removes the saree, washes away the stains, and puts it back. When Kumari gains consciousness, Siddhu tells her she fell asleep after the trio left and he was waiting for her. She is suspicious but Siddhu persuades her and proposes marriage her, to which she agrees.

The police arrests Siddhu and interrogates him to find the whereabouts of his friends, which he refuses to reveal. He is released from jail and marries Kumari. Three years later, Siddhu is running a kitchen in Hyderabad and the inspector plans to close the case because he could not find the trio. It is revealed that Siddhu has chained them in the ruins and has been feeding and torturing them for the past three years; they beg him to kill them, but Siddhu beats the trio after feeding them by saying that he is not mature enough to forgive them.

== Cast ==
- Raj Tarun as Siddhu
- Hebah Patel as Meena Kumari (Voice dubbed by Lipsika Bhashyam)
- Noel Sean as Shankar
- Naveen Neni as Photola Suresh
- Sudharshan as Sollu Srinu
- Bhanu Sri as Madhu
- Hema as Siddhu's mother
- Kamal as Ravi Kanth
- Thagubothu Ramesh as Yadagiri
- Giridhar as Narsing
- Aravind as Pawan Suresh
- Jogi Brothers as consultancy officers
- Satya Krishnan as a doctor
- Irfan as Satish
- Chanikya as Rakesh
- Sudha Reddy as Mala
- K. S. Raju as Stephen Paul

== Production ==
=== Development ===
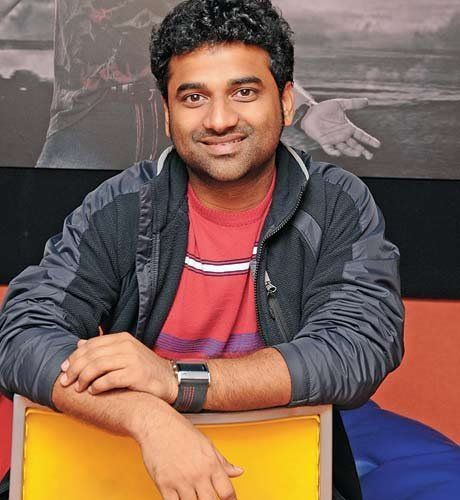
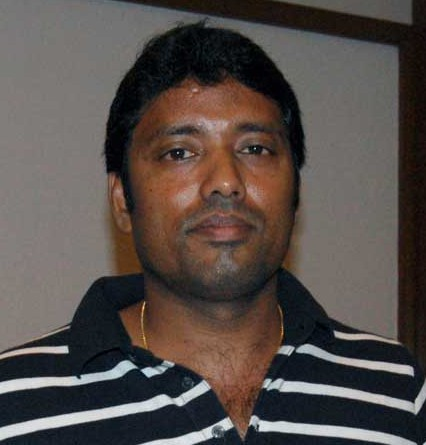
Devi Sri Prasad (left) and R. Rathnavelu (right) were signed as the film's music composer and director of photography. Neither of them charged remuneration for this film.

In October 2014, Sukumar announced he would co-produce a film along with Bandreddi Vijay Prasad and Thomas Reddy under the banner P.A. Motion pictures. Palnati Surya Pratap, who made his directorial debut with Current (2009), was chosen to direct this film. Sukumar titled the film Kumari 21F because it is about a 21-year-old woman named Kumari. He said it is not a female-centric film and both the lead roles, for which Raj Tarun and Sheena Bajaj were chosen, would be equally important. Tarun charged a remuneration of ₹25 lakh.

Sukumar wrote the film's story and screenplay, taking inspiration from his college days in Razole where a young woman went to a picnic with some young men; a major undertaking for a woman at the time. Rumours were spread and the woman was labelled as a "loose" character, which stayed in Sukumar's mind. He defined Kumari as an "honest and genuine human being who isn't afraid of expressing herself" and the "sort of girl most people would know", despite going overboard at times with her characterisation during the scripting stage. The climax of the film was said to have been inspired from the 2009 Argentinian thriller film The Secret in Their Eyes.

Sukumar's technicians Devi Sri Prasad and R. Rathnavelu were signed as the film's music composer and director of photography respectively. In an interview with Behindwoods in December 2014, Rathnavelu said the necessity of rejuvenating himself after Lingaa (2014), the film's script and his friendship with Sukumar were the reasons for choosing to work for this film. Neither Rathnavelu nor Prasad charged any remuneration for the film. Hebah Patel replaced Bajaj after the makers were impressed with her performance in Ala Ela (2014). Patel went through many workshops for her role that occupied 80% of the screen space; her voice was dubbed by Lipsika. Tarun did little preparation for his role because he felt it was "brilliantly conceived" and an extension of the roles he played in Uyyala Jampala (2013) and Cinema Choopistha Mava (2015).

=== Filming ===
Kumari 21F was produced on a budget of ₹6—₹15 crore. The film's principal photography commenced in December 2014, and was finished in two-and-half month period. Initially, Krishna Nagar, Hyderabad, was chosen as the film's backdrop. Rathnavelu felt they would create a noisy, crowded environment if shot there and chose to shoot in an isolated colony and in confined spaces. 60% of the film was shot at the R&B colony in Malakpet, Hyderabad. The song "Bang Bang Bangkok" was filmed in picturesque locales in Bangkok, and was choreographed by Prasad. Prasad said he composed a few signature steps during the composition of the song, which Sukumar and Rathnavelu liked. They wanted him to choreograph the song.

According to Rathnavelu, lighting played a key role in Kumari 21F. He shot the film with limited equipment and mostly used natural light. The experience he gained working on Haridas (2013) helped him with this film; he used Digital low lighting photography techniques, thereby using 80% of the generally required lighting. He found the climax sequences challenging to film because the emphasis was more on visuals rather than dialogue. Patel said of her experience during the filming of some intimate sequences, "There were so many people on the sets, so it was obviously uncomfortable. But then, I got myself mentally prepared for this kind of thing in a workshop I had undergone before the shoot. It also helped that I became good friends with Raj Tarun and that made things way less awkward". Tarun said he and Patel "put in a part of us into the characters to make the romance more believable".

== Soundtrack ==
The film's soundtrack featured five songs composed by Devi Sri Prasad, who also wrote lyrics for the song "Bang Bang Bangkok". Sri Mani and Anantha Sreeram respectively wrote the pallavi and charanams for "Meghaalu Lekunna". The remaining song were written by Ramanjaneyulu, Krishna Kanth and Chandrabose. The soundtrack album was distributed by Aditya Music and released on 30 October 2015 at Shilpakala Vedika, Hyderabad.

== Release ==
Kumari 21F was released worldwide in theatres on 20 November 2015; its release clashed with those of Cheekati Raajyam (the Telugu version of the Tamil film Thoongaa Vanam) and the 24th James Bond Hollywood film Spectre. Kumari 21F was released in 350 screens in Andhra Pradesh and Telangana, 50 screens in other parts of India, and 90 screens in international markets. Abhishek Pictures acquired the theatrical distribution rights for the Guntur, Krishna, East, West and Nellore areas. Dil Raju acquired the theatrical rights for the Nizam region. (Note: For film trade purpose, the Nizam region includes the three districts of Kalaburagi, Bidar, and Raichur in Karnataka and seven districts in the Marathwada region including Aurangabad, Latur, Nanded, Parbhani, Beed, Jalna and Osmanabad apart from the state of Telangana.) New York City-based company Creative Cinemas acquired the film's United States theatrical distribution rights, making it their debut in film distribution in the international market.

The film was screened in 22 screens across Tamil Nadu, including 12 in Chennai. It received an "A" (Adults only) certificate from the Central Board of Film Certification, which asked the makers to trim a lip-kissing sequence and mute several objectionable lines of dialogue, and suggested a few cuts. Regarding the Board's decision against unrestricted viewing, Sukumar said, "Even a father was once a young boy. I think this story gives him the space to both identify with his feelings as a young man and to understand what his son or daughter might be going through".

=== Marketing ===
One of the first-look posters released in October 2015 was alleged to have been plagiarised from the Russian magazine Chai-llot. After the film's first-look teaser was released by N. T. Rama Rao Jr., the makers announced a dubsmash challenge. Interested female participants were asked to search for an audio clip uploaded by the film's team and upload it on their Facebook pages. They were asked to e-mail the link or send a message on Facebook. The first 500 participants won invitations to the soundtrack launch event and 21 participants with most likes on their videos shared the stage with the film's cast and crew at the event. One winner was crowned "Kumari 21F" and received a special gift.

== Reception ==
=== Critical reception ===
Karthik Keramalu of CNN-IBN gave Kumari 21F 3.5 stars out of 5 and called it a "surprisingly good" film, adding, "The emotions of the leads are true and it rightly says that at the end of the day trust is all that matters and nothing else comes into the picture". Sify gave the film 3 stars out of 5 and called it a "coming-of-age story told in bold manner with an unusual climax", and praised the film's music and cinematography. Siddharth Rao of The Times of India also gave the film 3 stars out of 5 and stated, "In an industry where a damsel-in-distress-wooed-and-saved-by-an-angry-young-man is the norm, this is a refreshing film which provokes some thought". Rao also said, "The best part is the way that the film's climax is presented; the director Palnati Surya Pratap has definitely done a very mature job".

The Hans India also gave the film 3 stars out of 5 and stated, "Sukumar popularly known as a creative director in the industry, has once again come out with an unusual story. The film may disappoint normal audience but it will surely entertain the youth audience". Suresh Kavirayani of Deccan Chronicle gave the film 3 stars out of 5, called it a "[b]old and beautiful" one and praised the performances and the film's climax. Giving 2.75 stars out of 5, Behindwoods also called the film "[b]old and beautiful" and stated, "Kumari 21F starts off as a feel good romantic film, shifts gears slowly and gets very intense towards the end ... Sukumar must be credited for having given us a memorable character that would be talked about for years. You don’t find such bold female characters in Telugu cinema often."

Y. Sunita Chowdary of The Hindu called the film "regressive and cliched", and stated, "It's not enough if a canvas boasts of the biggest names in the industry, the content should be simple and progressive". She called the performances "strong and authentic". A. Harini Prasad of The New Indian Express called Kumari 21F a "Lacklustre Love Story" and stated, "Though the basic theme is enticing, the story-telling fails to impress. Raj Tharun’s performance and the climax, which is gripping, are probably the only things that could drive you to the theaters".

=== Box office ===
Kumari 21F debuted with an average occupancy of 80% globally; it grossed more than ₹3 crore with a distributor share of more than ₹2 crore, out of which approximately ₹56,69,014 was collected from Guntur, Krishna, East, West and Nellore areas. It collected US$27,153 from 80 screens in the US on the first day. In its first weekend, Kumari 21F grossed ₹8.5 crore with a distributor share of ₹5.5 crore at the AP/Nizam box office. According to trade analyst Taran Adarsh, it grossed US$149,752 (₹99 lakh) in its first weekend at the North American box office. The first weekend global gross and share figures stood at ₹10.58 crore and ₹6.34 crore respectively. It collected US$188,457 (₹1.25 crore) at the US box office in its first weekend, becoming one of the highest grossing Telugu films of the year there.

In ten days, Kumari 21F grossed ₹17.4 crore and collected a distributor share of ₹10.66 crore at the AP/Nizam box office. It grossed ₹2.3 crore with a distributor share of ₹85 lakh at the Karnataka box office. The ten-day global gross figure stood at ₹21 crore and Kumari 21F was declared a profitable venture. After losing screens to Size Zero and Shankaraabharanam, Kumari 21F collected US$3,190 from eight screens in the US and its 17-day total stood at US$252,151 (₹1.68 crore). Its US screen count was reduced to four in its fourth week and the 24-day US revenue was US$253,961 (₹1.7 crore). With this, Kumari 21F secured the tenth position in the list of the ten highest-grossing Telugu films of the year at the US box office.

In its lifetime, Kumari 21F grossed ₹38 crore and earned a distributor share of ₹18 crore worldwide. It was declared a commercial success based on the return on distributor's investment of ₹10 crore and became the 12th highest grossing Telugu film of the year.

== Remake ==
Kumari 21F was remade in Kannada with the same title by debutant director Sriram Vemula, with Pranaam Devaraj and Nidhi Kushalappa. Sukumar co-produced the Kannada version. The remake film in Kannada language was released in August 2018.
