= R. Rathnavelu =

Indian cinematographer

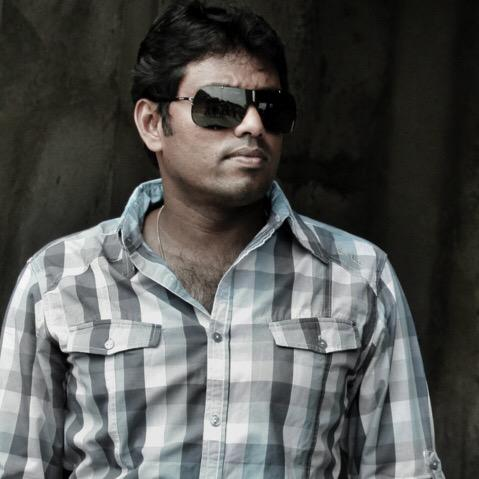
- Rathnavelu in 2012
- Born: Chennai, Tamil Nadu, India
- Education: Madras Film Institute
- Occupation: Cinematographer
- Years active: 1997–present
- Spouse: Hema Rathnavelu

R. Rathnavelu is an Indian cinematographer who works predominantly in Tamil and Telugu films. His work in films such as Sethu, Nandhaa, Vaaranam Aayiram, Enthiran, 1: Nenokkadine, Rangasthalam and Sye Raa Narasimha Reddy garnered recognition. He has garnered three Filmfare Awards South, the Vijay Awards, the Tamil Nadu State Film Award, four SIIMA Awards and the Kalaimamani Award bestowed by the Tamil Nadu state government for his work.

== Education ==
Rathnavelu graduated with a Bachelor of Science degree in Physics and completed a three year Diploma in Film Technology in cinematography from the M.G.R. Government Film and Television Training Institute. He went on to assist cinematographer Rajiv Menon, for Mani Rathnam's Bombay.

== Filmography ==
Year	Film	Language	Notes
1997	Aravindhan	Tamil	
1998	Sandhippoma	Tamil	
1999	Sethu	Tamil	Cinema Express Award for Best Cinematographer
2001	Nandhaa	Tamil	Filmfare Award for Best Cinematographer - South; Tamil Nadu State Film Award for Best Cinematographer
2002	Bagavathi	Tamil	
2003	Jayam	Tamil	
2003	Thirumalai	Tamil	
2004	Arya	Telugu	
2004	Perazhagan	Tamil	
2005	Maayavi	Tamil	
2005	February 14	Tamil	
2006	Cyanide	Kannada	
2007	Jagadam	Telugu	
2008	Gaalipata	Kannada	
2008	Vaaranam Aayiram	Tamil	Nominated—Vijay Award for Best Cinematographer
2010	Enthiran	Tamil	Filmfare Award for Best Cinematographer - South; Vijay Award for Best Cinematographer
2012	Podaa Podi	Tamil	1 song only
2013	David	Hindi	
2013	Haridas	Tamil	
2014	1: Nenokkadine	Telugu	SIIMA Award for Best Cinematographer – Telugu
2014	Lingaa	Tamil	
2015	Kumari 21F	Telugu	
2016	Brahmotsavam	Telugu	
2017	Khaidi No. 150	Telugu	
2018	Rangasthalam	Telugu	SIIMA Award for Best Cinematographer – Telugu; Filmfare Award for Best Cinematographer – South; Sakshi TV Movie Awards Best Cinematographer; Zee Cine Awards Telugu Best Cinematographer; Santosham Best Cinematographer Award
2019	Sye Raa Narasimha Reddy	Telugu	Zee Cine Awards Telugu Best Cinematographer
2020	Sarileru Neekevvaru	Telugu	SIIMA Award for Best Cinematographer – Telugu
2022	Etharkkum Thunindhavan	Tamil	
2024	Indian 2	Tamil	
2024	Devara: Part 1	Telugu	SIIMA Award for Best Cinematographer – Telugu
2026	Peddi	Telugu	
