= Sukumar =

Indian filmmaker (born 1971)

Bandreddi Sukumar
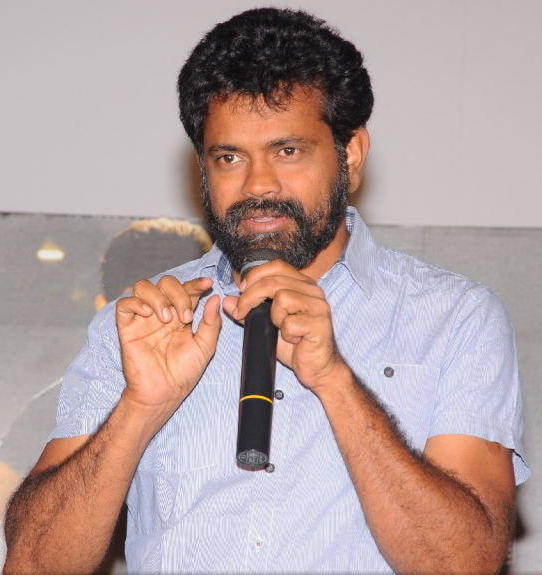
- Sukumar promoting 1: Nenokkadine in 2014
- Born: Bandreddi Sukumar; 11 January 1971 (age 55); Mattaparru, Andhra Pradesh, India
- Occupations: Film director; Film producer; Screenwriter; Professor
- Years active: 2004–present
- Spouse: Thabitha (m. 2009)
- Children: 2, including Sukriti Veni

Bandreddi Sukumar (born 11 January 1971) is an Indian film director, screenwriter, and producer who works in Telugu cinema. He is known for his intricate screenplays and for depicting protagonists with grey shades. He is one of the highest-paid directors in Indian cinema. He is also a National Award Winning Screenplay writer.

Before entering the film industry, Sukumar worked as a mathematics and physics lecturer at a junior college in Kakinada for nearly seven years. He began his film career as a writer, working with Editor Mohan, and later assisted V. V. Vinayak on Dil (2003). He made his directorial debut with Arya (2004), which was a major success and earned him the Filmfare Award for Best Director – Telugu and the Nandi Award for Best Screenplay Writer.

Sukumar's other notable films include Arya 2 (2009), 100% Love (2011), 1: Nenokkadine (2014), Nannaku Prematho (2016), Rangasthalam (2018), Pushpa: The Rise (2021), and Pushpa 2: The Rule (2024). Rangasthalam became the third highest-grossing Telugu film at the time, behind the Baahubali films. Pushpa was the highest-grossing Indian film of 2021, while Pushpa 2 went on to become third highest-grossing Indian films of all time.

In addition to his directorial work, Sukumar has produced films under his banner Sukumar Writings, including Kumari 21F (2015), Uppena (2021), and Virupaksha (2023). In recognition of his contributions to Telugu cinema, he received the K. V. Reddy Memorial Award in 2014..

== Early life and family ==
Sukumar was born on 11 January 1971, in a Telugu family in Mattaparru, a village near Malikipuram in erstwhile East Godavari district (present-day Konaseema district) of Andhra Pradesh. His father Tirupathi Rao Naidu was a rice trader and his mother Veera Veni was a homemaker. Sukumar was the youngest of the six children of Naidu and Veni. At the age of 6, following the slaughter of a rooster he loved, Sukumar practiced vegetarianism for a long time.

He did his schooling from Zilla Parishad High School, Razole and graduated with a master's degree in mathematics. He later worked as a mathematics and physics lecturer in Aditya Junior college, Kakinada. After nearly seven years, Sukumar and his junior Prakash Toleti decided to do something creative as they opined that their life has become too mundane as a lecturer.

== Career ==
Sukumar and Toleti began their career as writers in Telugu cinema and worked as writers for a few films. After writing three scenes for Jayanth C. Paranjee's Bavagaru Bagunnara? (1998), they were summoned by the college to help them in recruiting students. They walked out of the film on moral grounds. Due to lack of earnings, Sukumar briefly continued to teach students, earned money, and returned to film industry. He worked as an assistant director for Manasichi Choodu (1998). Sukumar later assisted Editor Mohan for Kshemamga Velli Labhamga Randi (2000) and Hanuman Junction (2001). Before making his directorial debut, Sukumar worked under V. V. Vinayak for Dil (2003) as an assistant director.

=== Debut and breakthrough: 2004–2011 ===
Sukumar began working on the script of his directorial debut, Arya (2004), in Visakhapatnam before joining the sets of Dil (2003). The producer of the film, Dil Raju, assured him that he would produce the film if Dil became a commercial success. Sukumar chose to narrate the story of a boy who confesses his love to a girl right in the beginning of the story, as opposed to films like Darr (1993), Kabhie Haan Kabhie Naa (1994), and Kaadhal Kondein (2003), where the protagonist's love/obsession for the female lead is revealed towards the end, as he found that idea an "obsolete" one. Raju was impressed with Sukumar's script and Allu Arjun was selected as the protagonist after considering the likes of Ravi Teja, Nithin, and Prabhas. Anuradha Mehta and Siva Balaji were chosen for the other two lead roles. R. Rathnavelu and Devi Sri Prasad were chosen as the film's director of photography and music director, respectively, who both went on to collaborate with Sukumar in many of his future films. Arya was a huge commercial and critical success, collecting a distributor's share of ₹16 crores and a box-office gross of ₹30 crores, on a budget of ₹4 crores.The success of Arya catapulted Sukumar into stardom overnight. He earned the Filmfare Award for Best Director – Telugu at the 52nd Filmfare Awards South ceremony, and the Best Screenplay Writer award at the annual Nandi Awards ceremony.

Sukumar then began working on the script of Jagadam (2007), a crime film starring Ram Pothineni and Isha Sahni. Unlike Arya, Jagadam focused more on violence and in an interview with South Scope, Sukumar called the film an "act of bravado", adding that he "made it with an innocent passion", without thinking about the audience's response. Jagadam received mixed reviews with Sify calling the film a "not so much a plot-driven one" albeit praising the work of its technical crew, whereas Rediff called it a "good effort". Following the mixed reviews, Jagadam was a box office failure, although, over the years, it has gained a major cult following.

He then wrote and directed Arya 2 (2009), which was promoted as the namesake sequel to his debut Arya. It featured Allu Arjun, Kajal Aggarwal, and Navdeep in the lead roles and narrated the story of Arya, a psychotic orphan whose love for his childhood friend, Ajay, and his colleague, Geetha, is never reciprocated. The film received mixed reviews from critics. However, Arya 2 became one of the few successful Telugu films of the year, and was praised for its stylistic quotient and music. Sukumar received a nomination for the Filmfare Award for Best Director – Telugu at the 57th Filmfare Awards South ceremony, but lost it to S. S. Rajamouli for Magadheera. Rajamouli stated that he regards Sukumar as the best of the lot after watching Arya 2, which according to Sukumar "was the most precious and sweetest thing I have heard about myself".

After a gap of two years, Sukumar's next directorial film 100% Love (2011) was released. Sukumar envisioned the film's concept 15 years ago, which dealt with the simple conflicts couples face and the way they solve them, and made changes based on the technological and behavioural developments of the students in the colleges. 100% Love featured Naga Chaitanya and Tamannaah in the lead roles and was produced by Allu Aravind and Bunny Vasu. 100% Love was commercially successful, collecting a share of ₹18.11 crore and received the Best Home-viewing Feature Film award at the annual Nandi Awards ceremony. Sukumar earned another nomination for the Filmfare Award for Best Director – Telugu at the 59th Filmfare Awards South, and a nomination for the Best Director – Telugu at the 1st South Indian International Movie Awards.

=== Darker themes: 2014–present ===
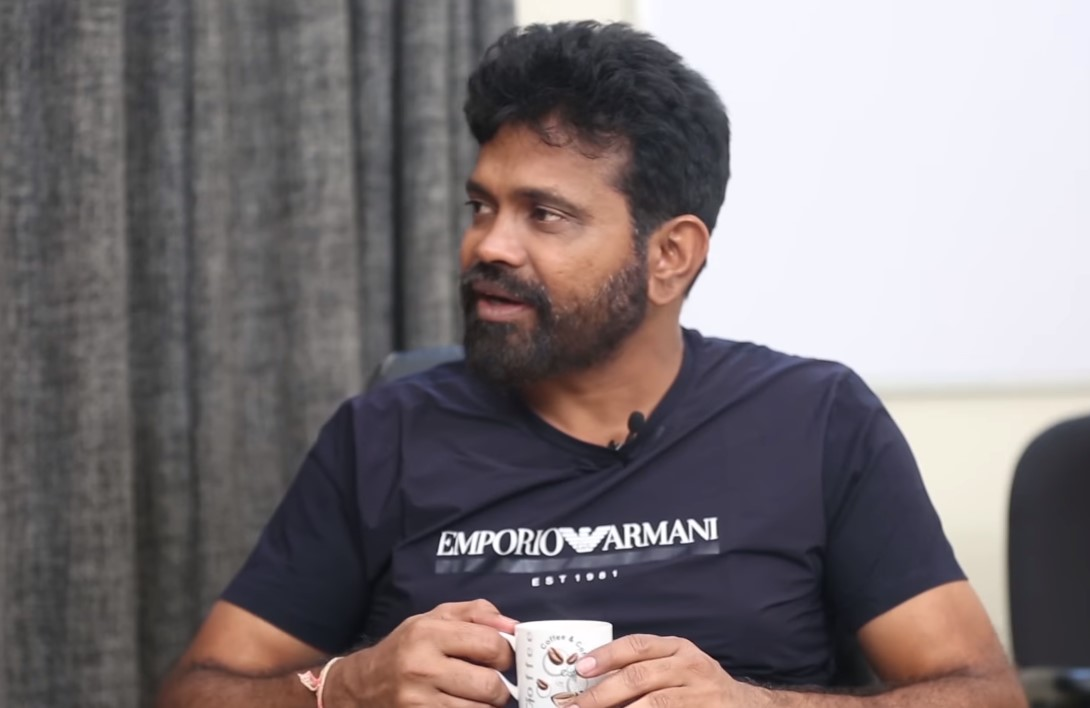
Sukumar promoting Rangasthalam 2018.

After completing 100% Love, Sukumar began working on 1: Nenokkadine, a psychological thriller keeping Mahesh Babu in mind as the protagonist as he felt that Mahesh had a universal appeal in terms of looks. The incident of a bus driver talking about a young boy who claims that his parents were murdered in that bus was taken as the story's base. He worked on the film's script for two months, and considered it as his dream project. 1: Nenokkadine was released on 10 January 2014 globally and received mixed reviews from the critics. While Suresh Kavirayani of Deccan Chronicle opined that Sukumar "fails to deliver" and the story is "run of the mill", Sangeetha Devi Dundoo of The Hindu stated, "Habitual to watching films that begin with a great premise only to fall into the commercial trap of force-fit comic situations, it comes as a relief when Sukumar laces the psychological thriller with subtle wit that never takes the focus away from the plot". Following the mixed reviews, 1: Nenokkadine collected approximately ₹28.9 crore share worldwide on a budget of ₹60–70 crore, thus becoming a commercial failure. Over the years, 1: Nenokkadine became a major cult film.

In 2014, he wrote and directed a 3-minute short film I Am That Change produced by and starring Allu Arjun. Upon its release, the short film received viral response online and was acclaimed by many including celebrities for its concept and execution.

Following the demise of his father Tirupathi Naidu, Sukumar decided to direct Nannaku Prematho starring N. T. Rama Rao Jr. and Rakul Preet Singh in the lead roles. Nannaku Prematho, which was Rama Rao Jr.'s 25th film as an actor, dealt with an emotional relationship between a father and his son spanning the last 30 days of the father's life. Released on 13 January 2016, Nannaku Prematho received positive reviews from the critics. Pranita Jonnalagedda of The Times of India stated that the viewers see ups every time when Sukumar "decides to listen to his inner self and gives us some interestingly conceived sequences" and downs come whenever he "gives in to the prerequisite mandates of Telugu cinema". An above average grosser at the domestic box office, Nannaku Prematho became the third highest grossing Telugu film of all time in the overseas market. His 2018 period action film with Ram Charan titled Rangasthalam received positive reviews with particular praise for Ram Charan's performance, and Sukumar's direction and screenplay. Rangasthalam ended up as one of the highest-grossing Telugu films of all time.

Post the success of Rangasthalam, Sukumar started working on the period action drama, Pushpa: The Rise (2021), starring Allu Arjun and Rashmika. Budgeted between ₹170–200 crores, it was released as a pan-Indian film and although it received mixed reviews from critics, the film was well received by the audiences and went on to get amazing commercial reception in Telugu, Hindi, and Tamil languages earning a total gross of ₹373 crores by the end of its theatrical run. Post the success of Pushpa: The Rise, Sukumar announced that the sequel, Pushpa 2: The Rule, is in development and production commenced in 2022. The film released on 5 December 2024 and was met with critical acclaim.

== Personal life ==
Sukumar met Thabitha Hamsini at the screening of Arya, in the Sudarshan Theatre, RTC X Roads, in Hyderabad. After a courtship of 4 years, they got married in 2009, in the presence of his parents and sister. Thabitha's parents initially opposed their relationship due to Sukumar being a film director, however, they later accepted their alliance. The couple have a daughter and a son, named Sukriti Veni (who made her film debut with Gandhi Tatha Chettu) and Sukranth, respectively.

== Filmmaking style ==
As a writer, Sukumar is influenced by the works of Gudipati Venkatachalam, Yandamuri Veerendranath, and Yaddanapudi Sulochana Rani. In an interview with Deccan Chronicle, he revealed that each of the romantic scenes in his films are inspired from the writings of either Veerendranath or Sulochana Rani. Sukumar mentioned that Martin Scorsese has had a huge influence on him. He uses non-linear screenplay for most of his films and few sequences of most of his films involve revelation of finest details and re-visiting a scene again and again. His screenplays are mostly complex and multi-layered which earned him the reputation of being an intelligent screenplay writer. In an interview of The Times of India in January 2014, Sukumar said that emotions play a key role in his films, stating that a film "may have multiple subplots, but in the end, it's the emotional curve that connects with the audience". Because of improvising the sequences on the sets and making changes to already filmed portions, his films took long time to complete their production phases.

In most of his films, Sukumar's protagonists are shown to be characterised with grey shades. Y. Sunita Chowdary of The Hindu commented that Sukumar "revels in giving a slight twist to his protagonist, in his background and character" and leaves the audience to understand him as he "unties the knots during narration and justifies his behaviour and makes us root for him". Karthik Keramalu of CNN-IBN, in his review of Kumari 21F, stated that Sukumar's lead characters are "psychologically wired differently", adding that at least one of the characters in his films "behaves in a way that will amuse the audience and the other characters present in the film". Regarding the same, Sukumar said, "We all have a lot of emotions and we suppress most of them fearing rejection. Instead we sport a smile and move on in this world. Problems arise when we don't enjoy all feelings like jealousy, selfishness and don't express them. To achieve something, there must be a driving force and that could be jealousy which you term as negative".

Except for the short film I Am That Change whose music was composed by Sai Karthik, Sukumar chose Devi Sri Prasad to compose the soundtrack and background score for all the films he directed. Sukumar worked with cinematographer R. Rathnavelu for Arya, Jagadam, 1: Nenokkadine, and Rangasthalam. When Dil Raju asked Sukumar about the budget to be allotted to Arya, Sukumar said that he first wanted R. Rathnavelu on board as the cinematographer. In an interview to The Hindu in March 2012, Rathnavelu said, "Sukumar's speciality is he can give you five different ways to solve every problem you encounter. He can get to the crux of the problem and figure out the best possible method to resolve it". Because of their friendship with Sukumar, neither Rathnavelu nor Prasad charged any remuneration for his maiden production venture Kumari 21F. He worked with B. Rajasekar, Venkat Prasad, Vijay K. Chakravarthy, and Mirosław Kuba Brożek for Arya 2, 100% Love, Nannaku Prematho, Pushpa: The Rise, and Pushpa 2: The Rule, respectively.

=== Frequent collaborators ===
Collaborator	Arya; (2004)	Jagadam; (2007)	Arya 2; (2009)	100% Love; (2011)	1: Nenokkadine; (2014)	Nannaku Prematho; (2016)	Rangasthalam; (2018)	Pushpa: The Rise; (2021)	Pushpa 2: The Rule; (2024)
Allu Arjun	Yes		Yes					Yes	Yes
Anasuya Bharadwaj							Yes	Yes	Yes
Jagapathi Babu						Yes	Yes		Yes
Sunil	Yes							Yes	Yes
Ajay			Yes					Yes	Yes
Brahmaji							Yes	Yes	Yes
Devi Sri Prasad	Yes	Yes	Yes	Yes	Yes	Yes	Yes	Yes	Yes
R. Rathnavelu	Yes	Yes			Yes		Yes		
Mythri Movie Makers							Yes	Yes	Yes
Karthika Srinivas				Yes	Yes			Yes	
Naveen Nooli						Yes	Yes		Yes

== Film production ==
Sukumar established Sukumar Writings in 2014 for presenting and producing films. Sukumar Writings' first venture was Kumari 21F, which had Sukumar's norm technicians of Devi Sri Prasad composing music and R. Rathnavelu as the director of cinematography. Ashok Banreddi and Thomas Reddy joined as co-producers with P. A. Motion Pictures; it was co-produced by Vijaya Prasad Bandreddi and Thomas Reddy.

Sukumar provided the story and screenplay for Kumari 21F, his debut feature film as a co-producer, which was directed by his assistant, Palnati Surya Pratap. He took inspiration from his college days in Razole where a young woman went to a picnic with some young men; a major undertaking for a woman at the time. Rumours were spread and the woman was labelled as a "loose" character, which stayed in Sukumar's mind. Produced on a budget of ₹6–9 crore, (Note: Film historian Rentala Jayadeva estimates the film's budget as ₹6 crore, Sify estimates the film's budget as ₹ 9 crore.) Kumari 21F grossed ₹38 crore and became the 12th highest grossing Telugu film of the year. Siddharth Rao of The Times of India stated, "In an industry where a damsel-in-distress-wooed-and-saved-by-an-angry-young-man is the norm, this is refreshing. Kudos to the writer Sukumar for giving yet another off-beat story with characters that can't be put into a box".

== Awards and nominations ==
Ceremony	Category	Film	Result	Ref(s)
Nandi Awards	Nandi Award for Best Screenplay Writer	Arya	Won	
Filmfare Awards South	Filmfare Award for Best Director – Telugu	Arya	Won	
Filmfare Awards South	Filmfare Award for Best Director – Telugu	Arya 2	Nominated	
Filmfare Awards South	Filmfare Award for Best Director – Telugu	Rangasthalam	Nominated	
Filmfare Awards South	Filmfare Award for Best Director – Telugu	Pushpa: The Rise	Won	
Filmfare Awards South	Filmfare Award for Best Director – Telugu	100% Love	Nominated	
South Indian International Movie Awards	Best Director – Telugu	100% Love	Nominated	
South Indian International Movie Awards	Best Director – Telugu	Nannaku Prematho	Nominated	
South Indian International Movie Awards	Best Director – Telugu	Rangasthalam	Won	
South Indian International Movie Awards	Best Director – Telugu	Pushpa: The Rise	Won	
South Indian International Movie Awards	Best Director – Telugu	Pushpa 2: The Rule	Won	
CineMAA Awards	Best Director (Jury)	Arya	Won	
CineMAA Awards	Best Screenplay writer	Arya	Won	
Santosham Film Awards	Best Director	Rangasthalam	Won	
KV Reddy memorial award (for contribution to Telugu cinema)	—	—	Won	

== Bibliography ==
- Chinnarayana, Pulagam (18 October 2015). సినిమా వెనుక స్టోరీ: ఫీల్ మై లవ్ [Behind the scenes: Feel my love] (in Telugu). Sakshi Funday. Archived from the original on 10 June 2016.
