= International School of Hyderabad =

Location
- ICRISAT Campus; Patancheru; Hyderabad, Telangana; India

Information
- Type: Non-profit international school
- Established: 1972; 54 years ago
- Principal: Linda LaPine
- Age range: 3–18
- Language: English
- Accreditations: New England Association of Schools and Colleges (NEASC)
- Website: www.ishyd.org

The International School of Hyderabad (ISH) is a non-profit, English medium international school located in Hyderabad, capital city of Telangana, India. The school serves students from overseas and Indian students who plan to do their post-primary education overseas. The school is accredited by the New England Association of Schools and Colleges (NEASC).

The Elementary School accepts students between the ages of 3 and 11 years of age. The Secondary School includes Grades 6 – 12, and is divided between the Middle School and the High School. Students in Grades 9 and 10 generally study the curriculum of the International General Certificate of Secondary Education (IGCSE) Cambridge Examination. Students in Grades 11 and 12 generally study the International Baccalaureate Diploma Programme (IBDP), although ISH also offers its own independent program, the ISH Diploma Programme (ISHDP).

The student body consists of about 400 students from over 23 nationalities, the majority being U.S. citizens. ISH focuses on preparing students for university abroad and most graduates attend universities in North America and Great Britain. At present, the teaching faculty includes teachers from 9 nationalities.

== History ==
The school was established by a group of parents in 1972. In 1982 the International Crops Research Institute for the Semi-Arid Tropics (ICRISAT) received permission to operate a school to provide education for children of expatriates and Indians from the Ministry of Foreign Affairs. It also became its major sponsor, funding the purpose-built school on the former site of the ICRISAT Staff Recreation Club in the Banjara Hills area of the city. As the student body grew in size, the Principal and board constructed a new group of buildings on the ICRISAT campus in Patancheru, on the outskirts of Hyderabad. The Secondary School moved into the new building in 2007. Construction on a new canteen was completed in 2009. In 2009, construction began on two new buildings: a building to house the Elementary School and a building to house Administration (such as Admissions, Finance, Purchasing, Administrators and School Nurse).

== Academics ==
ISH provides a range of curriculums. The elementary school curriculum is developed and internally certified by the Council of International School (CIS) and the New England Association of Schools (NEASC). The middle school curriculum is an amalgamation of different teaching practices to ensure proper education, physical, and mental growth. ISH is a certified center for Cambridge International Examinations (CIE), a part of the prestigious University of Cambridge in the UK. CIE oversees the curriculum in Grade 9 and Grade 10 leading to the International General Certificate of Secondary Education (IGCSE). IGCSE provides a strong foundation for higher level further education courses like the International Baccalaureate and is recognized by schools and universities around the world. ISH offers the International Baccalaureate Diploma Programme (IBDP) for its grade 11 and 12. It is the most widely recognized international qualification for university. A good performance in the IBDP generally improves a student's competitiveness for admission to universities around the world, Some universities also offer credits for college level courses if students achieve certain scores on the IBDP. ISH also has an independent diploma programme (ISHDP).

== Campus Features and Facilities ==
The core campus of the school occupies 5 acres within a 3600-acre secondary campus that is owned by ICRISAT. Its location on the ICRISAT campus enables ISH to have access to other learning environments that the ICRISAT campus can offer. The elementary and secondary schools each have their own buildings. Each building houses a library, music rooms, laboratories, computer rooms, language rooms, and playground.

ISH offers a wide variety of sports facilities. ISH has a multipurpose hall (gymnasium), two outdoor basketball courts, four outdoor grass courts for other sports, and has access to a 25-meter pool. This allows ISH to hold annual Sports Days along with practices to take part in competitions such as TAISI.

An extra benefit is large canteens and kitchens supplied by ICRISAT.

== Link to ICRISAT ==
ICRISAT continues to play a role in supporting and helping to develop the school and its facilities. The formal responsibility of managing the School lies with the Director General of ICRISAT. The Director General has delegated this responsibility to the Principal and the Special Advisor to the Director General of ICRISAT for Educational Affairs.
