= Palnati Surya Pratap =

Indian film director and screenwriter (born 1978)

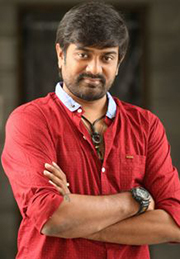
- Born: 13 January 1978 (age 48); Bhadrachalam, Andhra Pradesh (now Telangana), India
- Occupations: Film director, Screenwriter
- Years active: 2009–present
- Spouse: Sarika Pratap (m. 2012)
- Children: 2

Palnati Surya Pratap (born 13 January 1978) is an Indian film director and screenwriter who predominantly works in Telugu cinema. He celebrated for his nuanced storytelling and ability to craft emotionally resonant love stories. Known as a "sensible film-maker," he brings depth and relatability to his films, setting him apart in contemporary Telugu cinema.

Pratap made his directorial debut with Current (2009) a film that showcased a youthful narrative. He followed this success with Kumari 21F (2015), which gained acclaim for its fresh take on romance, earning him recognition as a sensitive storyteller. His recent directorial work was 18 Pages (2022).

== Early and personal life ==
After his graduation, Pratap worked with All India Radio for over an year. To pursue a career in film making, he discontinued his post-graduation and started as an Assistant Director for Suresh Productions.

== Career ==
After Current, he earned acclaim for Kumari 21F. However, both Current and 18 Pages (2022) were released to mixed reviews.

== Filmography ==
Year	Film	Notes
2009	Current	
2015	Kumari 21F	
2022	18 Pages	
2026	Jagamae Sangeetham	
2026	Antha Ramuloru Chusukuntaru	
