= Rang De =

2021 film by Venky Atluri

- Theatrical release poster
- Directed by: Venky Atluri
- Written by: Venky Atluri; P. Sathish Chandra
- Produced by: Suryadevara Naga Vamsi
- Starring: Nithiin; Keerthy Suresh
- Cinematography: P. C. Sreeram
- Edited by: Naveen Nooli
- Music by: Devi Sri Prasad
- Production company: Sithara Entertainments
- Release date: 26 March 2021
- Running time: 130 minutes
- Country: India
- Language: Telugu
- Budget: ₹30 crore
- Box office: est. ₹28.8 crore

Rang De (transl. Colour it) is a 2021 Indian Telugu-language romantic comedy film written and directed by Venky Atluri. The film starred Nithiin and Keerthy Suresh. The film's music is composed by Devi Sri Prasad while cinematography and editing are performed by P. C. Sreeram and Naveen Nooli respectively. The film was theatrically released on 26 March 2021 and the film received positive reviews from critics but it was commercial failure at box office citing COVID-19 Pandemic. The film's title is based on a song from Nithin's A Aa (2016).

== Plot ==
Arjun is a young man who enjoys attention from his parents and everyone in the neighbourhood. As the colony he lives doesn't have kids of his age, he wishes to have a girlfriend, where Anupama's "Anu" family moves in. Arjun's family members grow fond of Anu, which sows the seed of jealousy in Arjun. With time, It develops into hatred, but Anu has developed feelings for Arjun. Arjun is poor in academics and is always compared to Anu who is a bright student, which irritates him.

To escape the torture, Arjun plans to relocate to Dubai, where his sister lives, on the pretext of doing MBA. With the help of his friend's connection, who owns a consultancy, Arjun secures an excellent score in GMAT through cheating. His father throws a party and Arjun is delighted and also relieved about moving away from Anu. Arjun is informed that his application is on waitlist because he has 1 mark less than other two applicants of the top University he applied to, which only has 2 vacant seats.

Just as he agrees to change his University preference, it is revealed that one of the two better scored students is Anu, which frustrates Arjun. He leaks Anu's abroad study plans to her mother, who doesn't want her to study further but instead tries to convince her to get married. With Anu's strong reaction, it turns into a big fight and eventually leads to Anu agreeing to marriage with a broken heart. On the day of Anu's marriage, she kisses Arjun publicly in front of all the invitees. Being helpless, Arjun marries Anu due to family pressure.

On their first night, Anu reveals that she overheard a discussion between Arjun and his friends and got to know about Arjun's ill doing that spoiled her study plans. Anu confesses that the marriage was a plan and Arjun has no other option now but to take her abroad with him to the university. He manages to trick the other applicant to withdraw from the top University. The married couple now move to Dubai. In Dubai, Arjun and Anu have a love-hate relationship. One day after coming back from a night party, a mild physical fight starts between two of them, and they eventually end up having sex.

Anu learns that she's pregnant and tells Arjun but Arjun is not ready for it as he is not happy in the relationship and asks her to get an abortion. He alleges that Anu is purposefully turning his life into hell by trapping him in marriage and now parenthood. Angered with his allegations, Anu promises that she will divorce him once her studies complete and that she doesn't expect even his slightest involvement in the pregnancy. Sensing the problem between the couple, Arjun and Anu's parents visit them and try to convince them into building the marriage.

Although unmoved by their advice, Anu and Arjun decide not to fight as long as their parents stay. Meanwhile, Arjun feels ecstatic when he feels the baby kick from the womb and gradually realises the love Anu has for him, and also develops feelings for Anu recollecting the best moments they had and how she kept up with his hatred so far. When he goes to her to express his love, he realises she already signed the divorce papers and was waiting for him. Arjun is shocked and apologizes and then tells her how much he loved her and the couple reunite, where they live happily after the birth of their daughter.

== Cast ==
- Nithiin as Arjun
- Keerthy Suresh as Anupama "Anu"
- Naresh as Arjun's father
- Kausalya as Arjun's mother
- Rohini as Sailaja, Anu's mother
- Brahmaji as Travel Agent Sarvesh
- Master Ronit as Arjun's nephew
- Vennela Kishore as Shastri
- Abhinav Gomatam as Yanam
- Suhas as Suhas
- Vineeth as Arjun's brother-in-law
- Satyam Rajesh as Seenu
- Gayathri Raguram as Arjun's sister
- Raghuvaran as Anu's deceased father (portrait only)
- Vaishnavi Chaitanya as Arjun's brother-in-law's former love interest (cameo role)

== Production ==
=== Development ===
In June 2019, sources claimed that Nithiin has been approached for a new project directed by Venky Atluri, who directed Tholi Prema and Mr. Majnu and Sithara Entertainments was reported to produce the film. Keerthy Suresh was approached to play a lead. Sithara Entertainments confirmed the project officially on 24 June 2019, with Nithiin and Keerthy as the leading actors, and veteran cinematographer P. C. Sreeram confirmed his part in the project. In August 2019, Devi Sri Prasad started working on the film's music.

=== Filming ===
The film was launched on 8 October 2019 (on the occasion of Dusshera), at the office of Sithara Entertainments. Although few of the portions were filmed in Hyderabad, the team took a break after Nithiin went to Italy for a song shoot for his another film Bheeshma. A behind-the-scenes video was released in February 2020, by cinematographer P. C. Sreeram, with the shooting being held in Hyderabad.

After the shooting of the film was halted due to the COVID-19 pandemic in India in March 2020. The shooting of the film resumed in September 2020 with the safety guidelines instructed by the government to control COVID-19 pandemic. The post-lockdown schedule of the film was wrapped on 7 October 2020, with the foreign schedule for song shoot was supposed to take place in Italy on 25 October. In December 2020, the makers shot few portions at the Dubai Miracle Garden, which was completed within the first week. With few patch work scenes, the team wrapped the shooting in mid-January 2021.

In March 2021, Nithin in an interview said that Rang De would be his final film in the romance genre.

== Soundtrack ==
Rang De

Soundtrack album by Devi Sri Prasad
- Released: 19 March 2021
- Recorded: 2019–2020
- Genre: Feature film soundtrack
- Length: 24:15
- Language: Telugu
- Label: Aditya Music
- Producer: Devi Sri Prasad

Devi Sri Prasad chronology
Uppena (2021)	Rang De (2021)	Radhe (2021)
External audio
- Licensed audio on YouTube
- Licensed audio on JioSaavn

The film's soundtrack is composed by Devi Sri Prasad, replacing Venky Atluri's usual composer S. Thaman, who worked with the director in Tholi Prema and Mr. Majnu. Rang De marked Prasad's first collaboration with Atluri, who started work on the film's music in August 2019. The prelude of the first single "Emito Idhi" was released on 5 November 2020, and was scheduled to release on 7 November, although it was eventually released on 12 November 2020, due to technical difficulties. The second song "Bus Stande Bus Stande" was released on 27 February 2021. Two other tracks were released as singles in March 2021. The entire soundtrack album was unveiled on 19 March 2021.

All lyrics are written by Sri Mani.

Track listing
No.	Title	Singer(s)	Length
1.	"Rangule"	Shweta Mohan	4:17
2.	"Oorantha"	Mangli	4:18
3.	"Choosi Nerchukoku"	David Simon	3:11
4.	"Naa Kanulu Yepudu"	Sid Sriram	4:09
5.	"Bus Stande Bus Stande"	Sagar	3:38
6.	"Emito Idhi"	Kapil Kapilan, Haripriya	4:41
Total length:			19:57

== Release ==
The teaser of the film which was released in July 2020, announced the schedule for release on 14 January 2021, coinciding with Sankranthi. However, on 1 January 2021, the makers rescheduled the film's release to 26 March 2021. The film was digitally released on 12 June 2021 on ZEE5. The film was also dubbed and released in Tamil as Mr. & Mrs. Arjun.

== Reception ==
=== Critical response ===
Rang de received generally positive reviews from critics with praise for performances of lead actors, their chemistry, cinematography, visuals and Devi Sri Prasad's music. On the review aggregator website Rotten Tomatoes, 100% of 5 critics' reviews are positive, with an average rating of 6/10.

Hemanth Kumar in his review for Firstpost rated the film 3/5 and wrote: "Rang De rests heavily on the onscreen chemistry between Keerthy Suresh and Nithiin, and the duo deliver impressive performances." The Hindu critic Sangeetha Devi Dundoo described the film as a "coming-of-age story steeped in humour" and stated: "Keerthy Suresh is a treat to watch and Nithiin matches her at every step. Devi Sri Prasad’s music and the visual canvas, with cinematographer P C Sreeram being at the helm, also work hugely for the film.

The Indian Express journalist Manoj Kumar R who rated the film 3 stars of 5 wrote: "Nithiin and Keerthy Suresh film feels like a comforting blanket in these unpredictable times. It provides much-needed warmth and allows you to delight in a sense of nostalgia." A reviewer from Deccan Chronicle felt that the film had potential to be an entertainer but "lack of defining moments and weak writing are its undoing. The writing barely scratches the surface of the complexity of the situation — especially in the second half."

=== Box office ===
Rang De grossed ₹6.7 crore on its opening day in Andhra Pradesh and Telangana. The film grossed ₹19.6 crore worldwide in its first weekend. By the end of its theatrical run, it grossed ₹28.8 crore and was not successful at the box office.
