= Vishwanath & Sons =

2026 Indian film by Venky Atluri

- Theatrical release poster
- Directed by: Venky Atluri
- Written by: Venky Atluri
- Dialogues by: K. N. Vijayakumar
- Produced by: Naga Vamsi S; Sai Soujanya; Suraj Maraboyina & Rahul
- Starring: Suriya; Mamitha Baiju
- Cinematography: Nimish Ravi
- Edited by: Navin Nooli
- Music by: G. V. Prakash Kumar
- Production companies: Srikara Studios; Sithara Entertainments; Fortune Four Cinemas
- Distributed by: see below
- Release date: 14 August 2026
- Running time: 161 minutes
- Country: India
- Language: Tamil
- Box office: est. ₹200–260 crore (Note: Vishwanath & Sons's reported worldwide grosses vary between ₹200 crore (Hindustan Times, The Week) – ₹205.50 crore (Daily News and Analysis) – ₹260 crore (Outlook India, Cinema Express))

Vishwanath & Sons is a 2026 Indian Tamil-language romantic comedy-drama film written and directed by Venky Atluri. Produced by Sithara Entertainments and Fortune Four Cinemas, the film stars Suriya, alongside Mamitha Baiju, Radhika Sarathkumar, and Raveena Tandon. In the film, an industrialist reconnects with his child's surrogate mother after his son is diagnosed with a serious health condition.

The film was officially announced in May 2025 under the tentative title Suriya 46, as it is the actor's 46th film in a leading role, and principal photography commenced the same month. The official title was announced in March 2026. Filming took place at several locations, including Ooty and Belarus, before wrapping in June 2026. The film has music composed by G. V. Prakash Kumar, cinematography handled by Nimish Ravi and editing by Navin Nooli.

Vishwanath & Sons was released theatrically on 14 August 2026 and received generally positive reviews from critics. The film grossed over ₹200 crore (US$21 million) and emerged as the fourth highest-grossing Tamil film of 2026.

== Plot ==
At the 2024 Paris Olympics, Sanjay Vishwanath, a wealthy Indian industrialist and rifle shooter, faces a dire challenge when a racist mob intentionally damages his gun just minutes before the finals. With a new weapon unavailable for two hours, he draws on a trait inherited from his father, Vijay, to repair the damaged gun himself and competes, ultimately winning a gold medal. Upon his return to India, Sanjay's mother, Nirmala Devi, warmly welcomes him but expresses concern over his prolonged avoidance of marriage, fearing the Vishwanath bloodline will end with him. After frequently visiting San Francisco, Sanjay surprises everyone (the public and media) by returning with a newborn baby whom he had via surrogacy. This decision disappoints Nirmala, who had hoped for a traditional marriage route for grandchildren.

Sanjay names the baby Abhay. Despite initial resistance, Nirmala grows affectionate towards her grandson. However, Abhay is diagnosed with a life-threatening disorder that requires a bone marrow transplant. As Sanjay’s bone marrow does not match, he must contact the surrogate mother. They travel to San Francisco, and find that the mother is Madhanakameshwari Jyothilingam alias Maddy Jay, a carefree orphan and medical student. Shocked at her young age, Sanjay confronts the doctor who facilitated the surrogacy but learns that women in their early 20s are considered optimal for such arrangements. Maddy agrees to the procedure for $75,000, stipulating that the payment will help her cover medical school debts and escape loan sharks. Upon her arrival in India, Nirmala disapproves of Maddy's carefree attitude but gradually learns more about her background: her parents died in a car accident, which fosters a bond between them.

One day, Sanjay's stepmother, Anjali Vishwanath, invites Nirmala to her daughter's wedding, which triggers Sanjay's past trauma linked to his father's infidelity with Anjali and causes him to leave quickly. Nirmala accepts Anjali as family, while Sanjay, struggling with trust issues, engages in secretive affairs abroad. Maddy discovers Sanjay's lifestyle through family ties, leading to humorous exchanges between them. After Maddy's successful bone marrow transplant, Sanjay, feeling protective, confronts an aggressor, enhancing Maddy's feelings for him. However, he rejects her proposal for marriage due to their age difference and sees her off at the airport after paying for her treatment.

The following day, Maddy protests outside Sanjay's home for custody of her son, Abhay, resulting in court proceedings where Sanjay must demonstrate his parenting capability. As they navigate co-parenting, Maddy decides to halt her medical studies to prioritise family, pleasing Nirmala, who enjoys seeing them as a couple. However, Nirmala dies peacefully at home, leaving Sanjay heartbroken. Anjali contemplates cancelling her wedding, but Sanjay encourages her to continue, reaffirming his support during the ceremony.

The story shifts to Ooty, where Sanjay's second family endures ridicule from the townspeople due to Anjali being Vijay Vishwanath's second wife. This taunting significantly affects Anjali's daughter, Meghana, since childhood. Sanjay faces the challenge of restoring his family's respect, organising a marriage ceremony, and gaining Meghana's acceptance as her brother. He succeeds, growing closer to his second family, ultimately overcoming his past anger and trauma, emerging as a changed man. After the wedding, he expresses gratitude to Maddy for her emotional support toward him and Abhay.

When Maddy queries if Sanjay would accept her without the age gap, he remains silent. Maddy, hopefully interpreting his silence as an opportunity, thanks him, while Sanjay informs Anjali that he would have welcomed Maddy had she been older, recognising her sacrifices for him. He conveys that their relationship is more like a holiday for her, cautioning her against future regret.

Six months after their engagement, Sanjay expresses his unease about marrying Maddy at a young age and urges her to finish her medical degree before returning home. Maddy, feeling conflicted, deletes Sanjay's contact information but he reaches out with a card. Six years pass during which Maddy completes her MD in Medicine, maintaining a close relationship with her son Abhay. Sanjay's cousin facilitates regular visits between Maddy and Abhay, strengthening their mother-son bond.

Upon graduation, Maddy reconnects with Sanjay, receiving a warm welcome. He visits her in San Francisco, offering her a position at a hospital he intends to open in honour of his mother, and they share delightful moments. When Maddy questions him again about their age difference, Sanjay responds with a smile, leaving her without a definite answer. The narrative concludes with the trio experiencing a sunset by a lake, reinforcing their familial bond.

== Cast ==
Adapted from the closing credits:

- Suriya as Sanjay "Sanju" Vishwanath, a wealthy business magnate and Nirmala's son
  - Akhilan SJ as young Sanjay
  - Master Dhillshan as teen Sanjay
- Mamitha Baiju as Madhanakameshwari "Maddy Jay" Jyothilingam, Abhay's mother and Sanjay's love interest
- Radikaa Sarathkumar as Nirmala Devi, Sanjay's mother
- Raveena Tandon as Anjali Vishwanath (voice dubbed by Deepa Venkat), Vijay's second wife and Sanjay's stepmother
- Nassar as Ramanathan, Prakash's uncle
- Rajiv Menon as Vijay Vishwanath, Sanjay & Meghana's father; Anjali and Nirmala's husband
- Sudha as Ramanathan's wife
- Sunil Reddy as Advocate Ramalingam "Ramu", Sanjay's cousin and Sireesha's husband
- Harsha Chemudu as Kishore, Sanjay's assistant
- Raghu Babu as Judge R. Shanmugam
- Hyper Aadi as Lawyer Kailasam
- Mathew Varghese as Prakash's father
- Kalyani Natarajan as Prakash's mother
- Harika as Sireesha Ramalingam, Ramalingam's wife
- Bhavani Sre as Meghana, Sanjay's younger half-sister; Anjali's daughter and Prakash's wife
- VJ Pappu as Prakash
- Sarvadaman Banerjee as V. Chandrasekar, Anjali's father
- Sreeja Ravi as Anjali's mother
- Anarkali Marikar as Dr. Meena
- Karate Karthi as Durai, Sanjay's bodyguard
- Mukthar Khan as Sanjay's shooting coach (voice dubbed by R. Sarathkumar)
- George Maryan as Muthusamy
- Jaiseelan Sivaram as Ashok
- Kaali Venkat as Shiva
- Nakkalites Dhanam as Rukmani
- Java Sundaresan as Child Welfare Committee Member
- Deepa Shankar as Child Welfare Committee Member
- Mime Gopi as Thangavel
- Lab Sharath as Vishwanath's business partner
- Baby Charvik Reddy as Abhay Vishwanath, Sanjay's and Maddy’s son
  - Umarr Navid Nirban as a 7-year-old Abhay
- Shah Ra as a reporter
- Bjorn Surrao as Thangavel's henchman
- Aishwarya Dutta as Maddy's friend
- Cell Murugan as the tea stall vendor
- Harsha Harish as Ramanathan's daughter

== Production ==
=== Development ===
After the success of Lucky Baskhar (2024), it was reported that Suriya would collaborate with the director Venky Atluri on his 46th film as a lead actor. The project was reported to be produced by S. Naga Vamsi's Sithara Entertainments, with filming expected to begin in May. At this stage, reports described it as Suriya's first direct Telugu project and suggested a story involving the invention of an automobile engine. Suriya officially confirmed his collaboration with Atluri at the Retro (2025) pre-release event on 27 April 2025. He announced that it would be his next Tamil film and said filming would begin in May, with Hyderabad being an important production location. The project was tentatively known as Suriya 46.

The film was formally launched with a puja ceremony at Ramanaidu Studios in Hyderabad on 19 May 2026. Director Trivikram Srinivas attended and gave the first clap. Sithara Entertainments announced that the film would be a family entertainer, while Suriya and Atluri marked their first collaboration. Producer Naga Vamsi described the project as a "fun family entertainer" and said that he wanted to evoke the nostalgic feeling of Suriya's earlier films. A July 2025 report claimed that the project had originally been considered as a biopic about Sanjay Gandhi and the creation of Maruti 800, but that the screenplay subsequently changed after reported difficulties obtaining the necessary rights. The film was eventually titled Vishwanath & Sons, which was officially revealed on 2 March 2026. The final production was a collaboration between Sithara Entertainments and Fortune Four Cinemas, with Srikara Studios presenting the film. Naga Vamsi and Sai Sounanya were the producers.

=== Pre-production ===
Venky Atluri wrote the film, with K. N. Vijayakumar credited for the Tamil dialogues. The project marks Atluri's Tamil directorial debut, although Vaathi / Sir (2023) was shot simultaneously in Telugu and Tamil. He conceived the story of an "older man falling in love with a younger woman," but the subject matter was quite tricky, and he worried that no star would agree to star in it. Atluri told the story to 2D Entertainment head Rajsekar Pandian, who liked it. A few days later, Atluri was able to tell the story to Suriya. By then, the story was developed into a complete script. Suriya immediately loved the idea and agreed to develop it into a film. Atluri said that he wrote countless drafts for some scenes (some scenes even more than ten drafts) before the script was finalised.

The principal technical crew assembled for the film included cinematographer Nimish Ravi, editor Navin Nooli, music composer G. V. Prakash Kumar, production designer Banglan, executive producer Yalamanchili Gopala Krishna, line producer Uma Maheshwara Rao and art directors D. Siva Kamesh and Jithu Sebastian. Nimish Ravi had previously worked with Atluri on Lucky Bhaskar, while G. V. Prakash Kumar reunited with Atluri following Vaathi / Sir and Lucky Bhaskar. Prakash also reunited with Suriya after Soorarai Pottru (2020).

=== Casting ===
Suriya's character was shown as a middle-aged man whose professional ambitions intersect with family responsibilities and a relationship with a younger woman. Mamitha Baiju was announced as the female lead when the film was formally launched in May 2025. It marked her first pairing with Suriya. Raveena Tandon joined the cast in a prominent role. Her casting marked her return to Tamil cinema after her appearance in Aalavandhan (2001). Radikaa Sarathkumar was also announced as part of the principal cast at the film's launch. Bhavani Sre was reported to have joined the cast in August 2025, in a key role. The completed film also features Nassar, Sudha, Raghu Babu, Sunil Reddy, Harsha Chemudu, Kaali Venkat, George Maryan, Hyper Aadi, Sreeja Ravi, Sarvadaman D. Banerjee, Mathew Varghese, Kalyani Natarajan and Karate Karthi.

=== Filming ===
The film was ceremonially launched on 19 May 2025. Actual filming began in June 2025. The production banner announced that the shoot had commenced on 11 June 2025. By 17 July, it was reported that Suriya had completed the second production schedule. By October, the production had moved to Belarus for a European schedule. It was reported that scenes were being filmed there before the production was expected to return to Hyderabad. On 28 October, producer Naga Vamsi said that approximately 50% of the film had been shot. On 8 December, Suriya returned to Hyderabad to complete the remaining portions of the film. The film was also prominently shot in Ooty, especially the Fernhills Palace. By March 2026, established reports were treating production as completed, with the film in post-production. In June 2026, it was reported that the final schedule was underway at Annapurna Studios, Hyderabad. Final sound mixing work was completed in August, with the film having been locked.

== Music ==
The soundtrack and background score are composed by G. V. Prakash Kumar, reuniting with Atluri after Vaathi/Sir and Lucky Baskhar, and continuing the composer's association with Suriya that began with Soorarai Pottru (2020). The first single "Pattampoochi" was released as part of the film's musical promotions. It features vocals by Sublahshini with lyrics by Arunraja Kamaraj.

== Marketing ==
The film's title was revealed in March 2026, with the makers announcing that the teaser would arrive on 16 March 2026. Released on that date, the teaser introduced Suriya as Sanjay Vishwanath and trended online, with viewers praising the actor's look and the film's tone. The audio launch for this film was held on 2 August 2026, at Hindusthan College of Arts & Science, Coimbatore.

== Release ==
=== Theatrical ===
Vishwanath & Sons was released theatrically on 14 August 2026, timed for the Independence Day weekend. Producer Naga Vamsi confirmed the date on 28 May 2026, a shift from the originally announced July 2026 window. It was released in Tamil and Telugu languages, with the latter version being dubbed. Prior to release, it was reported that the film's pre-release business had exceeded ₹300 crore (US$32 million). The film was premiered in the United States on 13 August 2026.

=== Distribution ===
Primark Productions is responsible for the film's distribution in Tamil Nadu. Other distributors for this film in India include New Surya Films (Kerala), Rajukunta Film Distributors LLP (Nizam region), and VK Films (Karnataka). Overseas publishers include Shloka Entertainments (USA), York Cinemas (Canada), Linus Media (Belgium, Netherlands and Luxembourg), Zineflix (Germany), SAS Plaza (Sri Lanka) Boleyn Cinema (UK and Europe), Home Screen Entertainment (Singapore), and Malik Streams Corporation (Malaysia).

=== Home media ===
Netflix acquired the post-theatrical digital streaming rights. The film began streaming on Netflix from 11 September 2026 in Tamil, Telugu, Malayalam, Kannada and Hindi languages. The streaming version initially suffered from glitches such as a layering issue in one scene and a reference to Singam (2010) missing in the title card, unlike the theatrical version. Netflix fixed these issues following backlash from viewers.

== Reception ==
=== Box office ===
As of 16 August 2026, Vishwanath & Sons has grossed ₹43.47 crore (US$4.6 million) in India and ₹56.53 crore (US$6.0 million) in other territories for a total of ₹100 crore (US$11 million).

In India, Vishwanath & Sons opened to around ₹20 crore (US$2.1 million) and grossed approximately ₹10 crore (US$1.1 million) overseas for a total opening-day collection of close to ₹30 crore (US$3.2 million). On its second day, the film earned ₹22.25 crore (US$2.4 million) domestically. Its total domestic gross collection stood at ₹43.47 crore (US$4.6 million), while it grossed around ₹56.53 crore (US$6.0 million) overseas, taking its worldwide collection to ₹100 crore (US$11 million). It emerged as one of the highest-grossing Tamil films of 2026. Vishwanath & Sons became Suriya's fastest film to cross the ₹100 crore mark and his second film to achieve the milestone in the same year, after Karuppu. It was also the fastest to reach US$1,000,000 gross in North America among Suriya's films. The film grossed ₹200 crore (US$21 million) worldwide in its opening week. The film performed better at the box office in the Telugu region than in other regions. In Tamil Nadu, it was considered an underperformer.

=== Critical response ===
Vishwanath & Sons received generally positive reviews from critics, who praised its storyline, screenplay, cast performances and mature handling of taboo topics, while the film's predictability received criticism. On the review aggregator website Rotten Tomatoes, 90% of 10 critics' reviews are positive, with an average rating of 6.3/10.

Janani K of India Today gave 3.5/5 stars and wrote "Vishwanath and Sons is a wholesome film whose shortcomings don't get in the way too much. And as promised, Venky Atluri does make you grab your tissues – even if you're not bawling your eyes out, there are emotional moments that will make you tear up." Latha Srinivasan of NDTV gave 3/5 stars and wrote "Vishwanath and Sons is a sincere attempt at celebrating human relationships and the family. The Suriya-Mamitha Baiju starrer isn't perfect but it definitely has its heart in the right place." Yashaswini Sri of The Indian Express gave 3/5 stars and wrote "Vishwanath and Sons is not a perfect film. But it is also honest, well-performed, funny and emotionally rooted in a way that most mainstream family dramas simply are not in today's age." Sunny Singh of NewsX rated the film 3 out of 5 and appreciated Suriya's performance while criticising Venky Atluri's writing in the second half of the film, especially climax portions. BVS Prakash of Deccan Chronicle gave 1.5/5 stars and wrote "the film’s ambitious attempt to blend family drama, romance and social themes results in a contrived and largely disappointing outing."
