= List of awards and nominations received by Shweta Mohan =

Shweta Mohan (born 19 November 1985) is an Indian playback singer. She has received five Filmfare Awards South for Best Female Playback Singer, one Kerala State Film Awards and one Tamil Nadu State Film Awards. She has recorded songs for film music and albums in all the four South Indian languages namely, Malayalam, Tamil, Telugu, Kannada along with the Hindi language and has established herself as a leading playback singer of South Indian cinema. Some of her inspirations are Sujatha Mohan (her mother), Shreya Ghoshal, Alka Yagnik, Sadhana Sargam and K.S. Chitra.

== Kerala State Film Awards ==
The Kerala State Film Award are the film awards for a motion picture made in Kerala. The awards have been bestowed by Kerala State Chalachitra Academy since 1998 on behalf of the Department of Cultural Affairs, Government of Kerala, India. Shweta has received one award.

Year	Film	Nominated song	Result	Ref.
2007	Nivedyam	"Kolakkuzhal Vili Ketto"	Won	

== Tamil Nadu State Film Awards ==
The Tamil Nadu State Film Awards are the most prestigious film awards given for Tamil films in India. They are given annually to honour the best talents and provide encouragement and incentive to the South Indian film industry by the Government of Tamil Nadu. Shweta has received one awards.

Year	Film	Nominated song	Result	Ref.
2011	Multiple films	" Various Songs "	Won	

== Filmfare Awards South ==
The Filmfare Awards South is the South Indian segment of the annual Filmfare Awards, presented by The Times Group to honour both artistic and technical excellence of professionals in the South Indian film industry. Shweta is awarded and also nominated singer by Filmfare South, receiving 6 awards from 20 nominations across 3 languages.

Year	Language	Film	Nominated song	Result	Ref.
2008	Malayalam	Ore Kadal	"Yamuna Veruthe"	Won	
2009	Tamil	Pirivom Santhippom	"Kanden Kanden"	Nominated	
2010	Malayalam	Moz & Cat	"Thottal Pookkum"	Nominated	
2010	Malayalam	Robinhood	"Priyanu Mathram"	Nominated	
2011	Malayalam	Oru Naal Varum	"Maavin Chottile"	Nominated	
2012	Tamil	180	"Nee Koorinal"	Nominated	
2013	Malayalam	Arike	"Shyama Hare"	Won	
2015	Malayalam	Ottamandaram	"Onnanam Kombathe"	Nominated	
2015	Tamil	Kaaviya Thalaivan	"Yarumilla "	Nominated	
2016	Malayalam	Su Su Sudhi Vathmeekam	"Kayamboo Niramayi"	Nominated	
2016	Tamil	Thangamagan	"Enna Solla"	Won	
2017	Malayalam	White	"Oruvela Veendumee"	Nominated	
2017	Tamil	Kabali	"Maayanadi"	Won	
2018	Malayalam	Munthirivallikal Thalirkkumbol	"Oru Puzhyarikil"	Nominated	
2018	Tamil	Mersal	"Maacho"	Nominated	
2022	Malayalam	Varane Aavashyamundu	"Muthunne Kannukalil"	Nominated	
2023	Malayalam	Malayankunju	"Mannum Niranje"	Nominated	
2024	Telugu	Sir	"Mastaaru Mastaaru"	Won	
2025	Tamil	Amaran	"Hey Minnale"	Won	
2025	Malayalam	Rifle Club	“Gandharva Ganam"	Nominated	

== South Indian International Movie Awards ==
The South Indian International Movie Awards, also known as the SIIMA Awards, started in 2012, rewards the artistic and technical achievements of the South Indian film industry. Shweta received one award from 21 nominations.

Year	Language	Film	Nominated song	Result	Ref.
2013	Malayalam	Arike	"Shyama Hare"	Nominated	
2013	Tamil	3	"Nee Partha"	Nominated	
2014	Malayalam	Kadhaveedu	"Kattile Poomanam"	Nominated	
2014	Tamil	Maryan	"Innum Konjam"	Nominated	
2015	Malayalam	Ottamandaram	"Onnanam Kombathe"	Nominated	
2015	Tamil	Kaaviya Thalaivan	"Yaarumilla"	Nominated	
2016	Malayalam	Anarkkali	"Ee Thanutha"	Nominated	
2016	Kannada	Kendasampige	"Kanasali Nadesu"	Nominated	
2016	Tamil	Thangamagan	"Enna Solla"	Won	
2017	Malayalam	White	"Oruvela Veendumee"	Nominated	
2018	Malayalam	Oru Cinemakkaran	"Ozhuki Ozhuki"	Nominated	
2018	Tamil	Pa. Pandi	"Paarthen"	Nominated	
2019	Tamil	Nimir	"Poovukku"	Nominated	
2021	Malayalam	Vijay Superum Pournamiyum	"Etho Mazhayil"	Nominated	
2021	Malayalam	Kappela	"Kannil"	Nominated	
2022	Malayalam	Chathur Mukham	"Maayakondu"	Nominated	
2023	Malayalam	Malayankunju	"Mannum Niranje"	Nominated	
2024	Tamil	Vaathi	"Va Vaathi"	Nominated	
2024	Telugu	Sir	"Maastaaru Maasataru"	Nominated	
2025	Tamil	Amaran	"Hey Minnale"	Nominated	
2025	Telugu	Lucky Baskhar	"Shrimathi Garu"	Nominated	

== Asianet Film Awards ==
The Asianet Film Awards is an award ceremony for Malayalam films presented annually by Asianet, a Malayalam-language television network from the south-Indian state of Kerala. Shweta has received three awards.

Year	Category	Film	Song	Result
2008	Best Female Playback Singer	Novel	Kuyile	Won
2014	Best Female Playback Singer	Ottamandaram	Onnanam Kombathe	Won
2017	Best Female Playback Singer	Munthirivallikal Thalirkkumbol	Oru Puzhayarikil	Won

== Vanitha Film Awards ==
The Vanitha Film Awards are presented annually by Vanitha, an Indian magazine from the Malayala Manorama group in the south Indian state of Kerala. The awards ceremony has been instituted to honour both artistic and technical excellence in the Malayalam language film industry. Held and broadcast annually since 1998. Shweta Mohan won one awards for two-different song's.

Year	Category	Film(s)	Song(s)	Result
2017	Best Female Playback Singer	Baahubali 2: The Conclusion	Kanna Nee Urangeda	Won
2017	Best Female Playback Singer	Munthirivallikal Thalirkkumbol	Oru Puzhayarikil	Won

== Amritha TV channel Award ==
Year	Category	Film	Song	Result
2007	Best Female Playback Singer	Nivedyam	Kolakkuzhal	Won

== V4 Entertainers Award ==
Year	Category	Film	Song	Result
2014	Best Female Playback Singer	Kaviya Thalaivan	Yarumilla Thani	Won

== Jaihind TV Film Awards ==
Year	Category	Film	Song	Result
2010	Best Female Playback Singer	Oru Naal Varum	Mavin Chottile	Won

== Asiavision Movie Awards ==
The Asiavision Movie Awards have been held annually since 2006 to honour the artists and technicians of South Indian Cinema. Shweta has received one award.

Year	Category	Film	Song	Result
2010	Best Female Playback Singer	Oru Naal Varum	Mavin Chottile	Won

== Mirchi Music Awards South ==
The Mirchi Music Awards South is the South Indian segment of the annual Mirchi Music Awards, started in 2010 by Radio Mirchi to honour both artistic and technical excellence of professionals in the South Indian music industry.

Year	Category	Language	Film	Song	Result
2011	Best Female Playback Singer	Telugu	Komaram Puli	Amma Thalle	Won

== Vijay Music Awards ==
Year	Category	Film	Song	Result
2011	Best Female Playback Singer	180	Nee Koorinaal	Won

== International Tamil Film Awards ==
The International Tamil Film Awards, is the Tamil Film segment of the annual International Tamil Film Awards, to honour both artistic and technical excellence of professionals in the Tamil Indian music industry.

Year	Category	Result
2012	Female Playback Singer Jury Award	Won

== South Indian Cinematographers Association Awards ==
Year	Category	Film	Song	Result
2014	Best Female Playback Singer	Kaviya Thalaivan	Yarumilla Thani	Won

== Other major honours and recognitions ==
- 2007:Doordarshan's Yuva award "Kolakuzhal vili keatto raadhe" Nivedhyam (Malayalam)
- 2007:Sunfeast Isai Aruvi Award
- 2007. Film Critics Award for Best Female Playback Singer
- 2011:Big Tamil Melody Awards for Best Melody Female Playback Singer - "Nee Koorinaal" (180)
- 2012:Award for Most Airplays in BIG FM for - "Nee partha vizhigal"(3) (along with Vijay Yesudas)
- 2014;Thikkurissy Film Award for Best Female Playback Singer 2014 - ' 'Ottamandaram' ' (shared with Sujatha Mohan)
- 2014:SICA Award for Best Female Playback Singer 2014 - "Yarumilla"
