= Lakshya =

Lakshya (lit. 'aim') may refer to:

- Lakshya (2004 film), a 2004 Indian Hindi-language film directed by Farhan Akhtar
- Lakshya (2021 film), a 2021 Indian Telugu-language film
- DRDO Lakshya, an Indian remotely piloted target drone system
- Lakshya, a Marathi-language crime series
- Laksh Lalwani, an Indian actor

== See also ==
- Lakshyam (disambiguation)
