= Navin Nooli =

Indian film editor

- Other name: Naveen Nooli
- Occupation: Film editor
- Years active: 2012–present

Navin Nooli is an Indian film editor who works primarily in Telugu cinema. He won the National Film Award for Best Editing for Jersey (2019).

== Career ==
Navin made his film debut with Login (2012), a Hindi film directed by his friend, Sanjeev Reddy. He garnered acclaim for his work in Ladies & Gentlemen (2015). Music director Devi Sri Prasad, whom he worked with in S/O Satyamurthy (2015), recommended him to Sukumar and thus, enabled him to become the editor for Nannaku Prematho (2016). In 2019, he worked on Jersey. In a review of the film by The Times of India, the reviewer wrote that "Naveen Nooli too does a good job with the editing with the film. despite its long runtime and laggy bits not ending up seeming like a cricket documentary". His work in the film made him the recipient of National Film Award for Best Editing.

In May 2024, it was reported that editors Karthika Srinivas and Ruben were replaced by Nooli in Pushpa 2: The Rule (2024), due to conflicts in scheduling.

== Filmography ==
- All films are in Telugu, unless mentioned otherwise.

Key
| † | Denotes films that have not yet been released |

| Year | Title | Notes |
|---|---|---|
| 2012 | Login | Hindi film |
| 2012 | Devaraya | |
| 2014 | Maaya | |
| 2014 | Govindudu Andarivadele | |
| 2014 | Romeo | |
| 2015 | Ladies & Gentlemen | |
| 2016 | Nannaku Prematho | Nandi Award for Best Editor |
| 2016 | Dhruva | |
| 2017 | Darsakudu | |
| 2018 | Tholi Prema | |
| 2018 | Rangasthalam | |
| 2018 | Aatagadharaa Siva | |
| 2018 | Ee Maaya Peremito | |
| 2018 | Aravinda Sametha Veera Raghava | |
| 2018 | Bluff Master | |
| 2019 | Mr. Majnu | |
| 2019 | Jersey | National Film Award for Best Editing |
| 2019 | ABCD – American Born Confused Desi | |
| 2019 | Dorasaani | |
| 2019 | Ranarangam | |
| 2019 | Gang Leader | |
| 2019 | Arjun Suravaram | |
| 2020 | Ala Vaikunthapurramuloo | |
| 2020 | Bheeshma | |
| 2020 | Solo Brathuke So Better | |
| 2021 | Krack | |
| 2021 | Uppena | |
| 2021 | Ninnila Ninnila | |
| 2021 | Rang De | |
| 2021 | Varudu Kaavalenu | |
| 2021 | Shyam Singha Roy | |
| 2022 | Bheemla Nayak | |
| 2022 | DJ Tillu | |
| 2022 | Jersey | Hindi film |
| 2022 | Acharya | |
| 2022 | The Warriorr | |
| 2022 | Thank You | |
| 2022 | Swathi Muthyam | |
| 2022 | 18 Pages | |
| 2023 | Veera Simha Reddy | |
| 2023 | Butta Bomma | |
| 2023 | Vaathi | Bilingual film; Shot in Tamil and Telugu |
| 2023 | Sir | Bilingual film; Shot in Tamil and Telugu |
| 2023 | Dasara | |
| 2023 | Ravanasura | |
| 2023 | Virupaksha | |
| 2023 | Agent | |
| 2023 | Bro | |
| 2023 | Mad | |
| 2023 | Aadikeshava | |
| 2023 | Dhootha | TV show |
| 2024 | Guntur Kaaram | |
| 2024 | Operation Valentine | Bilingual film; Shot in Telugu and Hindi |
| 2024 | Tillu Square | |
| 2024 | Gangs of Godavari | |
| 2024 | Lucky Baskhar | |
| 2024 | Appudo Ippudo Eppudo | |
| 2024 | Pushpa 2: The Rule | |
| 2025 | Thandel | |
| 2025 | Mad Square | |
| 2025 | Jack | |
| 2025 | Jaat | Hindi film |
| 2025 | Kingdom | |
| 2025 | They Call Him OG | |
| 2025 | Telusu Kada | |
| 2025 | Mass Jathara | |
| 2026 | Funky | |
| 2026 | Peddi | |
| 2026 | Lenin | |
| 2026 | Vishwanath & Sons | |
| 2026 | The Paradise | |
| 2026 | Aadarsha Kutumbam House No: 47 - AK47 | |
| 2026 | Vrushakarma † | |
| 2026 | Dada † | |
| 2026 | King 100 † | |
| TBA | Maharagni: Queen of Queens † | |

== Awards and nominations ==
| Year | Award | Category | Work | Result | Ref. |
|---|---|---|---|---|---|
| 2015 | Nandi Awards | Best Editor | Ladies & Gentlemen | Won | |
| 2016 | Nandi Awards | Best Editor | Nannaku Prematho | Won | |
| 2019 | Zee Cine Awards Telugu | Best Editor | Rangasthalam | Won | |
| 2021 | National Film Awards | Best Editing | Jersey | Won | |
| 2024 | Telangana Gaddar Film Awards | Best Editor | Lucky Baskhar | Won | |
