= Ketika Sharma =

Indian actress (born 1995)

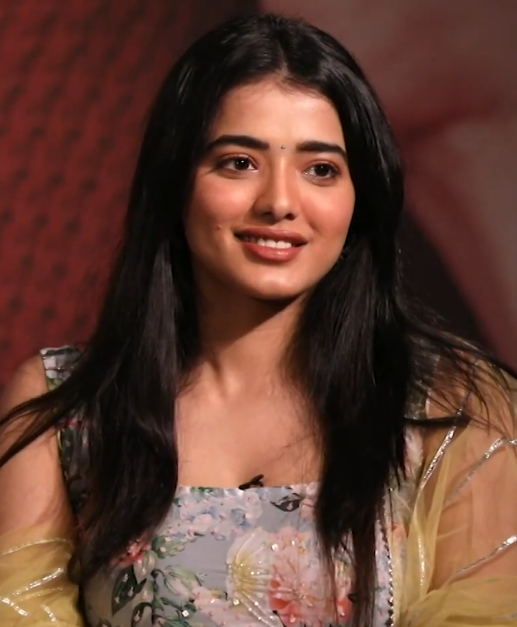
- Sharma in 2022
- Born: 24 December 1995 (age 30); New Delhi, India
- Occupation: Actress
- Years active: 2021–present

Ketika Sharma (born 24 December 1995) is an Indian film actress who appears in Telugu films. She is known for Romantic (2021) and Ranga Ranga Vaibhavanga (2022) as well as for Bro (2023), which is her highest grossing release.

== Early life ==
Sharma was born on 24 December 1995, in New Delhi, India. She started modeling after completing her studies. She has also become a social influencer. Sharma went viral over social media because of her Dubsmash video clips.

== Career ==
Sharma made her acting debut with Romantic, in 2021 opposite Akash Puri. Murali Krishna CH of The New Indian Express opined that she "shows promise". In the same year, she also appeared opposite Naga Shaurya in Lakshya, where critics thought that she just looked "pretty on-screen". In 2022, Sharma appeared in Ranga Ranga Vaibhavanga opposite Panja Vaisshnav Tej. Sangeetha Devi Dundoo stated "Ketika's performance is just about adequate in a film that doesn’t flesh out her character well enough."

Sharma appeared opposite Sai Dharam Tej in the 2023 film, Bro. The film emerged as the fifth highest grossing film of the year and her first commercial success. Balakrishna Ganeshan of The News Minute noted, "Ketika gives a decent performance in her limited role." Sharma made her Hindi film debut in 2024, with Vijay 69. Devesh Sharma of Filmfare noted, "Ketika's portrayal of the teenager's older girlfriend adds an emotional layer."

== Filmography ==
=== Films ===
Key
†	Denotes films that have not yet been released

- All films are in Telugu-language, unless otherwise noted.

Year	Title	Role	Notes	Ref.
2021	Romantic	Monica		
2021	Lakshya	Rithika		
2022	Ranga Ranga Vaibhavanga	Radha		
2023	Bro	Ramya		
2024	Vijay 69	Malti	Hindi film	
2025	Robinhood	Herself	Special appearance in song "Adhi Dha Surprisu"	
2025	Single	Purva Nettem		
2026	Meesaya Murukku 2	Laila Singh	Tamil Film	
TBA	Rajesh M Selva's next †	TBA	Filming	

=== Music video appearances ===
Year	Title	Singer(s)	Ref.
2019	"Haaye Ve"	Ammy Virk	
