= Telangana Gaddar Film Awards 2024 =

1st Telangana Gaddar Film Awards
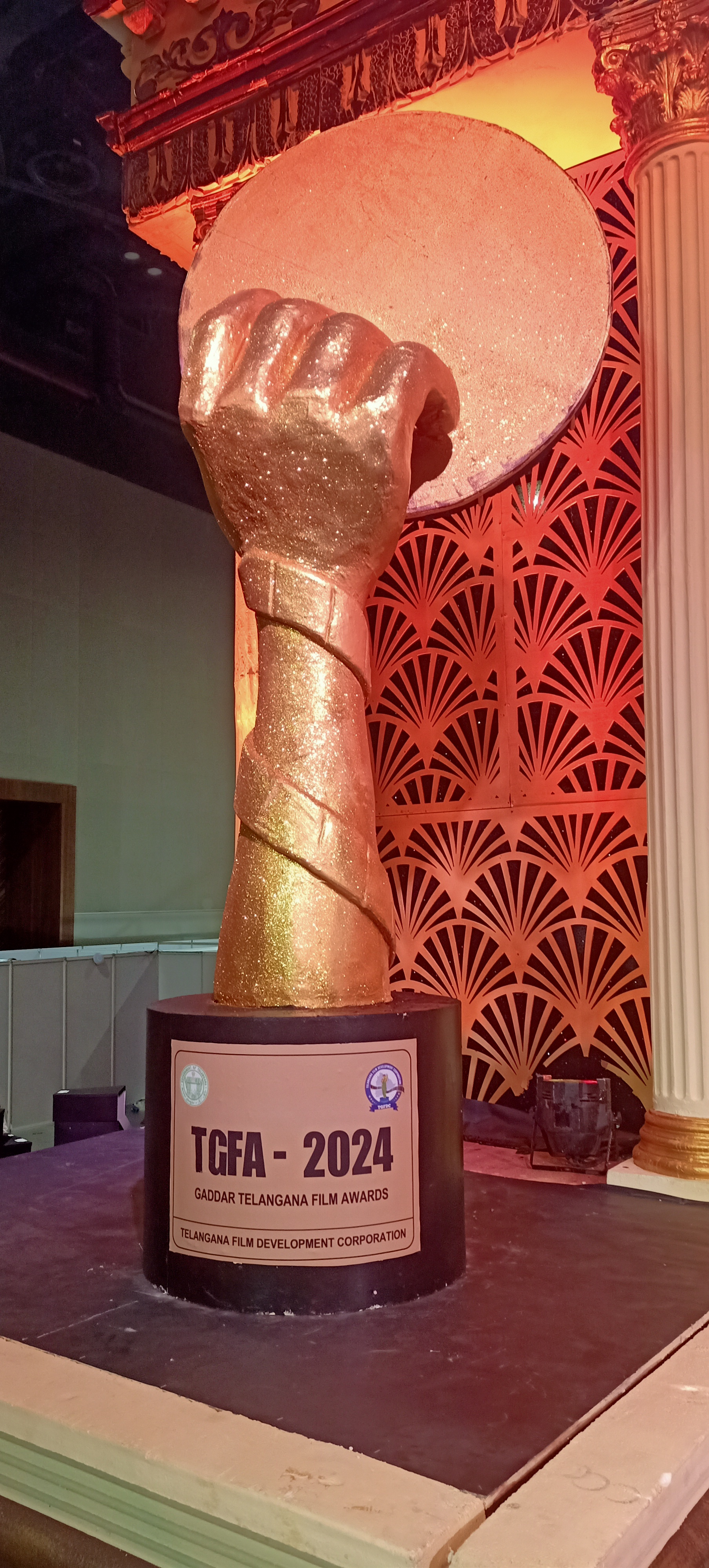
- Awarded for: Best of Telugu cinema in 2024
- Awarded by: Telangana Film Development Corporation
- Presented by: Government of Telangana
- Announced on: 20 May 2025
- Presented on: 14 June 2025
- Site: HITEX Convention Center Hyderabad

Highlights
- Best Feature Film: Kalki 2898 AD
- Most awards: Kalki 2898 AD and Lucky Baskhar (4 each)

The 1st Telangana Gaddar Film Awards were announced by the Telangana Film Development Corporation on 30 May 2025 to honour the best films of 2024 in Telugu cinema. It is the inaugural edition of the newly established awards. These annual awards are presented by the Government of Telangana to recognise excellence in Telugu cinema, as well as lifetime achievements in Indian cinema. The awards were instituted in 2025 in the honor of revolutionary Telugu poet Gaddar.

The Awards ceremony was held at HITEX Exhibition Centre, Hyderabad on 14 June 2025. The event was attended by Telangana Chief Minister Revanth Reddy, Deputy Chief Minister Mallu Bhatti Vikramarka, Minister for Cinematography Komatireddy Venkat Reddy, and producer Dil Raju, chairman of the Telangana Film Development Corporation (TGFDC).

== Background ==
The Telangana Gaddar Film Awards (TGFA) are annual awards presented by the Government of Telangana to recognise excellence in Telugu cinema, as well as lifetime achievements in Indian cinema. The TGFDC announced the Telangana Gaddar Film Awards (TGFA) for best picture and six special awards, for the period between June 2014 to December 2024, on 30 May 2025. The awards were instituted in 2025 and honored films which were released from June 2014, after the bifurcation of Andhra Pradesh.

== Jury ==
In April 2025, the Government of Telangana announced a 15-member jury for the year 2024, headed by the veteran actress Jayasudha. The jury received a total of 1,248 nominations across all categories. Of these, 1172 are in individual categories, while 76 entries span feature films, children's films, documentaries, film criticism, books, and other segments.

The members of the jury were as follows:

1. Jayasudha, chairperson, veteran actress
2. Jeevitha Rajasekhar, director and former actress
3. K. Dasaradh, director
4. V. N. Aditya, director
5. Nandini Reddy, director
6. Siva Nageswara Rao, director
7. L. Srinath, director
8. Uma Maheshwara Rao, director
9. Kasarla Shyam, lyricist
10. Edida Raja, producer
11. Vijay Kumar Rao, exhibitor
12. Goutham, film analyst
13. Venkata Ramana, journalist
14. Lakshmi Narayana, journalist
15. Managing Director, Telangana Film Development Corporation (Member-Convener)

Other key figures include:

1. B. Narsing Rao: Chairman of the Rules and Guidelines Committee.
2. Dil Raju: Vice-chairman of the Guidelines Committee and Chairman of TGFDC.
3. M. Murali Mohan: Veteran Actor and Senior Jury Member who participated in the selection of the decade awards (2014–2023).

== Special awards ==
Six special awards are given honoring eminent film personalities for their outstanding contribution to Indian cinema and Telugu cinema. The winners of the year 2025 are as follows:

Award	Awardee(s)
NTR National Film Award - Artist only	Nandamuri Balakrishna
Paidi Jairaj Film Award - Indian film personality	Mani Ratnam
Raghupathi Venkaiah Film Award - Other than film artist Telugu	Yandamuri Veerendranath
B N Reddy Film Award - Telugu film director	Sukumar
Nagireddy & Chakrapani Film Award - Telugu producer	Atluri Purnachandra Rao
Kantha Rao Award - Telugu artist	Vijay Deverakonda

== Main awards ==
Winners of the awards were announced on 30 May 2025 by the Government of Telangana. The winners were felicitated at the grand ceremony held on 14 June 2025, at HITEX Exhibition Centre, Hyderabad.

=== Feature Film ===
Award	Film	Awardee(s)
First Best Feature Film	Kalki 2898 AD	Producer: C. Aswini Dutt; Director: Nag Ashwin
Second Best Feature Film	Pottel	Producer: Nishank Reddy Kuruthi; Suresh Kumar Sadige; Director: Sahith Mothkuri
Third Best Feature Film	Lucky Baskhar	Producer: Suryadevara Naga Vamsi; Director: Venky Atluri
Feature Film on National Integration, Communal Harmony and Social Uplift	Committee Kurrollu	Producer: Padmaja Konidela; Jayalakshmi Adapaka; Director: Yadhu Vamsi
Feature Film on Environment, Heritage and History	Razakar	Producer: Gudur Narayana Reddy; Director: Yata Satyanarayana
Dr. M Prabhakar Reddy Best Wholesome Entertainment Film	Aay	Producer: Bunny Vas; Director: Anji K. Maniputhra
Best Debut Film of a Director	Committee Kurrollu	Yadhu Vamsi
Best Children's Film	35 Chinna Katha Kaadu	Producer: Srujan Yarabolu; Siddharth Rallapalli; Director: Nanda Kishore Emani

=== Individual and Technical Awards ===
Award	Awardee(s)	Film
Best Director	Nag Ashwin	Kalki 2898 AD
Best Actor	Allu Arjun	Pushpa 2: The Rule
Best Actress	Nivetha Thomas	35 Chinna Katha Kaadu
Best Supporting Actor	S. J. Surya	Saripodhaa Sanivaaram
Best Supporting Actress	Sharanya Pradeep	Ambajipeta Marriage Band
Best Child Actor	Master Arun Dev Pothula	35 Chinna Katha Kaadu
Best Child Actress	Baby Harika	Mercy Killing
Best Comedian	Satya	Mathu Vadalara 2
Best Comedian	Vennela Kishore	Mathu Vadalara 2
Best Music Director	Bheems Ceciroleo	Razakar
Best Lyricist	Chandrabose	Raju Yadav
Best Male Playback Singer	Sid Sriram	Ooru Peru Bhairavakona ("Nijame Ne Chebutunna")
Best Female Playback Singer	Shreya Ghoshal	Pushpa 2: The Rule ("Sooseki")
Best Story Writer	Siva Paladugu	Music Shop Murthy
Best Screenplay Writer	Venky Atluri	Lucky Baskhar
Best Cinematographer	Vishwanath Reddy Chelumalla	Gaami
Best Editor	Naveen Nooli	Lucky Baskar
Best Audiographer	Aravind Menon	Gaami
Best Choreographer	Ganesh Acharya	Devara: Part 1
Best Art Director	Nitin Zihani Choudhary	Kalki 2898 AD
Best Action Choreographer	K. Chandrasekhar Rathod	Gangster
Best Make-up Artist	Nalla Seenu	Razakar
Best Costume Designer	Archana Rao	Kalki 2898 AD
Best Costume Designer	Ajay Kumar	Kalki 2898 AD
Special Jury Award	Dulquer Salmaan	Lucky Bhaskar
Special Jury Award	Ananya Nagalla	Pottel
Special Jury Award	Sujith and Sandeep	KA
Special Jury Award	Prashanth Reddy and Rajesh Kallepalle	Raju Yadav
Special Mention	Faria Abdullah	Mathu Vadalara 2

== Criticism ==
It was reported that the jury members of the 2024 awards only partially watched a few films that were nominated for the award, and winners were made according to the "whims and fancies" of the jury members.

A group of social activists have written formal letter to the Telangana Government to withdraw award presented to the film Razakar: The Silent Genocide Of Hyderabad which won in the Best Historical Film category. They argued that the film is "highly polarising" and "propaganda-driven." They criticised the jury's decision, pointing to a specific clause in the Telangana Gaddar Film Awards Regulations, 2024: “The jury must not consider films that disrupt communal harmony and cultural integrity."
