= Venky Atluri =

Indian film director

- Born: Atluri Venkateswara Rao; Hyderabad, Telangana, India
- Occupations: Actor; Screenwriter; Film director
- Years active: 2007–present
- Spouse: Pooja Chowdary Nayidi (m. 2023)

Venky Atluri is an Indian film director and screenwriter who works predominantly in Telugu and Tamil films. He is known for directing Tholi Prema (2018), Sir / Vaathi (2023), Lucky Baskhar (2024) and Vishwanath & Sons (2026). The lattermost is his highest grosser and has won the National Film Award for Best Screenplay – Dialogue Writer.

== Early life and career ==
Venky Atluri was named Atluri Venkateswara Rao after his grandfather and graduated in B. Tech from DVRCET. Venky Atluri married Pooja Chowdary in 2023.

== Career ==
His acting debut was Gnapakam (2007) directed by Uppalapati Narayana Rao co-starring Vishakha Singh. The film was a box office failure.

His first film as a writer was Sneha Geetham (2010). Venky Atluri later starred in Madhura Sreedhar Reddy directed film It's My Love Story (2011). He then turned writer for Sai Kiran Adivi’s Kerintha, which was a super hit. When he got clarified about his skills in writing, he decided to become a director and made his directorial debut with the 2018 film Tholi Prema (2018), which was a blockbuster hit.

He made his Tamil debut with Vaathi (2023) starring Dhanush in the lead role, and the bilingual drama was also released along with the Telugu version. Next, Lucky Baskhar, which was released in October 2024, starred Dulquer Salmaan a mild-mannered banker in 1980s Bombay who becomes entangled in financial fraud. The film won Atluri the National Award for Best Dialogue at the 72nd National Film Awards. In 2026, Vishwanath & Sons has received positive reviews from critics and audiences.

== Filmography ==
Key
†	Denotes films that have not yet been released

=== As a film director ===
Year	Title	Language	Notes	Ref.
2018	Tholi Prema	Telugu		
2019	Mr. Majnu	Telugu		
2021	Rang De	Telugu		
2023	Vaathi	Tamil & Telugu	Simultaneously shot in Telugu as Sir	
2024	Lucky Baskhar	Telugu		
2026	Vishwanath & Sons	Tamil		

=== As a writer ===
- Note: all films are in Telugu, unless otherwise noted.

Year	Title	Notes	Ref.
2010	Sneha Geetham	Dialogues only; uncredited	
2011	It's My Love Story	Dialogues only; uncredited	
2015	Kerintha		

=== As an actor ===
- Note: all films are in Telugu, unless otherwise noted.

Year	Title	Role	Notes	Ref.
2007	Gnapakam	Srinu	credited as Atluri Venkateswara Rao	
2010	Sneha Geetham	Ravi		

== Awards and nominations ==
Award	Year	Category	Work	Result	Ref.
Filmfare Awards South	2026	Best Director – Telugu	Lucky Baskhar	Nominated	
Filmfare Awards South	2026	Critics Best Film – Telugu	Lucky Baskhar	Won	
National Film Awards	2026	Best Screenplay (Dialogue)	Lucky Baskhar	Won	
South Indian International Movie Awards	2019	Best Debut Director – Telugu	Tholi Prema	Nominated	
South Indian International Movie Awards	2025	Best Director – Telugu	Lucky Baskhar	Nominated	
Telangana Gaddar Film Awards	2025	Best Screenplay Writer	Lucky Baskhar	Won	
Zee Cine Awards Telugu	2019	Favorite Debut Director	Tholi Prema	Won	
