= Ranga Ranga Vaibhavanga =

Indian romantic drama film

- Theatrical release poster
- Directed by: Gireeshaaya
- Written by: Gireeshaaya
- Produced by: B. V. S. N. Prasad
- Starring: Panja Vaisshnav Tej; Ketika Sharma; Naveen Chandra
- Cinematography: Shamdat Sainudeen
- Edited by: Kotagiri Venkateswara Rao
- Music by: Devi Sri Prasad
- Production company: Sri Venkateswara Cine Chitra
- Release date: 2 September 2022
- Country: India
- Language: Telugu

Ranga Ranga Vaibhavanga (transl. In all glory) is a 2022 Indian Telugu-language romantic drama film written and directed by Gireeshaaya. The film is produced by B. V. S. N. Prasad under the banner Sri Venkateswara Cine Chitra. The film featured Panja Vaisshnav Tej, Ketika Sharma and Naveen Chandra in the lead roles with the music composed by Devi Sri Prasad. The film opened to negative reviews criticizing the lackluster and cliche story. The film ended up a box-office failure, the second in a row for Vaisshnav Tej.

== Plot ==
Rishi and Radha are children of best friends Ramu and Chanti born on same date at same hospital on time 1:43PM. They fall in love at the age of 14. They share a common gift watch with each other on their birthday. However, Rishi witnesses Radha being harassed by their classmate Rakesh and warns Radha to avoid him. While Radha abides by Rishi's words, Rakesh hatches a plan to trick her into talking to him. This invokes Rishi's fury, and he starts beating up Rakesh, which prompts Radha to slap Rishi, who slaps her in return. With this event, they both vow that they will not talk to each other until one of them first breaks the silence.

=== 10 years later ===
Rishi and Radha are medicos and are still in love but do not talk to each other.

On the other hand, their families get close to each other and share the same neighborhood. Radha has an elder sister Subha and an elder brother Arjun Prasad. Arjun is an aspiring politician for Samaja Seva Party. The party has a youth leader Rana, who uses the influence of his father to become youth president when his plans are thwarted by Arjun, who exposes his drug scam. Now, the entire family of Rishi and Radha plan to go for Tirupathi leaving the pair. While Radha prepares for her studies at her friend's home. Rishi arrives to distract her with loud music. So, Radha decides to leave her home when she gets caught by Rana. While Rana and his associates try to molest her, Rishi arrives to save her, and Radha kisses him passionately, breaking the silence between the two and uniting them.

Meanwhile, Arjun's friend Siva arrives from the US and is the son of the Minister. Arjun decides to give the hand of his elder sister to his friend, while his sister reveals she is in love with Rishi's brother. This infuriates the minister, who publicly demeans Arjun. Losing his prestige in the colony, Arjun picks a fight with Rishi's family and orders his family members to stay away from them.

Radha and Rishi attend a medical camp. Radha is assigned to a guardian, the village sarpanch. One day there appears to be an accident to the auto in which Rishi was travelling, and Radha rushes to the hospital to see Rishi doing well. She breaks the silence one more time, and the couple unites again for a second time. The pair decides to unite their family the way they got united. So, they make a plan to bring the mothers of both families to a temple. At the temple, the mothers get united after having a conversation with the daily opera. Now they get both their fathers to a theatre that plays Yamagola. The fathers who were friends earlier get united quickly. Now Rishi tries to help Arjun gain prominence in his party by supporting a local MLA to win a bye-election. However, there appears to be an accident of a cobra bite to a kid nearby and Rishi and Arjun try to help their family. While Rishi carries the kid to the hospital, Arjun gives some money to the mother for hospital expenses. The local MLA wins the election despite Rana planning to do some rigging and Rishi thwarting his plans.

However, Rana utilizes this as an opportunity to show the party committee members that Arjun bribed the public for a vote and used his family to rig the elections. While the committee plans to take action against Arjun, the minister arrives and shows the bribe is a made-up story by Rana and saves Arjun. Now Arjun rushes home, however on the way Rishi and Radha confront him together and show him that their families have united, and he is all alone. Arjun is furious at this and confronts his family when Ramu explains to him that Chanti is his friend even before he got married and kids were born and questions his morality bringing change in Arjun's behavior. Arjun realizes his mistake and apologizes to both the families and unites Rishi's brother with his elder sister Subha and Rishi with his younger sister Radha. Both couples get married.

== Cast ==
- Panja Vaisshnav Tej as Rishi
  - Aakash Srinivas as Young Rishi
- Ketika Sharma as Radha
  - Harika Pedada as Young Radha
- Naveen Chandra as Arjun Prasad (Radha's elder brother)
- Prabhu as Ramu, Radha's father
- Tulasi as Radha's mother
- Naresh as Chanti, Rishi's father
- Pragathi as Rishi's mother
- Subbaraju as Rana, Arjun's rival
- Shobhita Rana as Subha (Radha's elder sister)
- Kaushik Ghantasala as Rishi's elder brother
- Naga Babu as Minister and Siva's father
- Rajshri Nair as Minister’s wife
- Ali as Lecturer
- Sri Lakshmi as Rishi's grandmother
- Nagineedu as Minister (Key leader of Samaja Seva Party)
- Raja Ravindra as Doctor (Trainer)
- Satya as Village Sarpanch
- Raghu Babu as Radha’s friend’s father
- Jhansi as Radha’s friend’s mother
- Fish Venkat as Rana's associate
- Ajay Rahul as Rishi's friend
- Rajkumar Kasireddy as Rishi’s friend
- Nirupam Paritala as Dr. Karthik Anandrao aka Doctor Babu from Karthika Deepam

== Production ==
=== Development ===
The film was announced on 2 April 2021 under the tentative title #Vaisshnav3 with Gireesaaya directing marking his Telugu debut. On 24 January 2022, the film's title was revealed as Ranga Ranga Vaibhavanga.

=== Filming ===
Principal photography began on 2 April 2021.

== Soundtrack ==
Ranga Ranga Vaibhavanga

Soundtrack album by Devi Sri Prasad
- Released: 2022
- Recorded: 2021–2022
- Genre: Feature film soundtrack
- Length: 3:30
- Language: Telugu
- Label: Sony Music India
- Producer: Devi Sri Prasad

Devi Sri Prasad chronology
| The Warriorr (2022) | Ranga Ranga Vaibhavanga (2022) | Drishyam 2 (2022) |

Singles from Ranga Ranga Vaibhavanga
- 1. "Telusa Telusa" Released: 3 February 2022; 2. "Kothaga Ledhenti" Released: 6 May 2022; 3. "Siri Siri Muvva"

The soundtrack and score of the film is composed by Devi Sri Prasad. The audio rights were acquired by Sony Music India.

| No. | Title | Lyrics | Singer(s) | Length |
|---|---|---|---|---|
| 1. | "Telusa Telusa" | Sri Mani | Shankar Mahadevan | 3:30 |
| 2. | "Kothaga Ledhenti" | Sri Mani | Armaan Malik, Hari Priya | 4:00 |
| 3. | "Siri Siri Muvvallona" | Sri Mani | Devi Sri Prasad, Shreya Ghoshal, Javed Ali | 3:38 |
| 4. | "Ranga Ranga Vaibhavanga (Title Track)" | Roll Rida | Devi Sri Prasad, Sagar, Srinisha Jayaseelan | 2:31 |

== Release ==
On 11 February 2022, it was announced that the film is scheduled to release on 27 May 2022. but was postponed to 1 July 2022.

== Reception ==
Neeshita Nyayapati of The Times of India rated the film 2 out of 5 and wrote "Ranga Ranga Vaibhavanga is an outdated mess that feels like a mish-mash of films you've already seen before". Balakrishna Ganeshan of The News Minute rated the film 2 out of 5 stars and wrote "Director Gireesaaya borrows scenes from old blockbusters like Manasantha Nuvve, 'Love Story' and others familiar to Telugu audiences, and uses them as a template to evoke the same emotions instead of writing an original story". A critic of Sakshi Post rated the film 2 out of 5 and wrote "Ranga Ranga Vaibhavanga is a routine drama and predictable story". Sangeetha Devi Dundoo of The Hindu stated "Vaishnav Tej and Ketika Sharma's Telugu rom-com has an outdated storyline that belongs to the mid-90s and early 2000s".
