= Aadikeshava =

2023 Telugu film directed by N. Srikanth Reddy

- Theatrical release poster
- Directed by: Srikanth N. Reddy
- Written by: Srikanth N. Reddy
- Produced by: Naga Vamsi; Sai Soujanya
- Starring: Panja Vaisshnav Tej; Sreeleela; Joju George; Vinay Varma
- Cinematography: Dudley; Additional: Arthur A. Wilson; Prasad Murella
- Edited by: Naveen Nooli
- Music by: G. V. Prakash Kumar
- Production companies: Sithara Entertainments; Fortune Four Cinemas; Srikara Studios
- Release date: 24 November 2023
- Country: India
- Language: Telugu
- Budget: ₹20 crore

Aadikeshava is a 2023 Indian Telugu-language action drama film directed by Srikanth N. Reddy in his directorial debut and produced by Naga Vamsi. The film stars Panja Vaisshnav Tej, Sreeleela and Joju George in the lead roles and marks the Telugu debut of Joju. The soundtrack and background score were composed by G.V. Prakash Kumar, while Dudley and Navin Nooli handled the cinematography and editing.

Aadikeshava was released on 24 November 2023 to generally negative reviews from critics, with most critics panning its direction, writing, action sequences, screenplay, characterization, and predictability and cliches. The film became a box office disaster the third in a row for Vaisshnav Tej.

== Plot ==
Balakottayya "Balu", a happy go lucky guy, who lives with his adopted parents and always roams with his best buddy Sudhakar "Sudha" later he falls for a girl named Chitravathi "Chitra" who owns a cosmetic company to impress her he manages to join her company,later Chitra also falls for him eventually learning their relationship her father tries a failure threat on him at Chitra's birthday, but occurring a sudden events Balu learns his birth secret from his mother that he has been adopted at the death bed of his biological mother who was his adopted mother's friend and made a promise to not involve her son into these issues and he got to know that the death of his biological father Rayalaseema-based MLA Maha Kaleswar Reddy and his original name is Rudra Kaleswar Reddy. Then he returns to Rayalaseema to save his sister Vajra and the ancestral temple from a mining mafia boss, Chenga Reddy happens to be his brother-in-law who have political aspirations.

Then the power struggle begins. After a long fight, he finally managed to kill Chenga Reddy finally restores peace and comes back to home. Finally the film ends with Balu's mother reveals actually his elder brother Aadikeshava "Aadi" a doctor is the real Rudra Kaleswar Reddy, who is actually adopted by his parents, he is the original son to them which shocks Balu like the way she kept her promise.

== Cast ==
- Panja Vaisshnav Tej as Balakotayya "Balu"/Rudra Kaleswar Reddy
- Sreeleela as Chitravathi "Chitra", Balu's love interest
- Joju George as Chenga Reddy
- Aparna Das as Vajra, Rudra Kaleshwar Reddy's sister
- Jayaprakash as Rudra Kaleshwar Reddy's adoptive father
- Vinay Varma as Vijay Mohan, Minister for Mines and Geology
- Radhika Sarathkumar as Rudra Kaleshwar Reddy's adoptive mother
- Suman as Maha Kaleshwar Reddy, Balu/Rudra's biological father
- Sadha as Parvathy, Rudra Kaleshwar Reddy's cousin
- Sudharshan as Sudharshan "Sudha", Balu's childhood friend
- Anand as Chitra's father
- Tanikella Bharani as Rudra Kaleshwar Reddy's uncle and Maha Kaleshwar Reddy's elder brother
- Sudha as Balu's aunt and Maha Kaleshwar Reddy's sister-in-law
- Shravan as Aadhikesava/ Real Rudra Kaleshwar Reddy

== Soundtrack ==
The film's BGM and music were composed by G. V. Prakash Kumar. The first single "Sittharala Sithravathi" was released on 9 September 2023. The second single "Hey Bujji Bangaram" was released on 11 October 2023. The film's third single "Leelammo" was released on 25 October 2023.

Aadikeshava

Soundtrack album by G. V. Prakash Kumar
- Released: 2023
- Genre: Film soundtrack
- Length: 10:41
- Language: Telugu
- Label: Aditya Music
- Producer: G. V. Prakash Kumar

G. V. Prakash Kumar chronology
Japan (2023)	Aadikeshava (2023)	Captain Miller (2024)

Singles from Aadikeshava
- 1. "Sittharala Sithravathi" Released: 9 September 2023; 2. "Hey Bujji Bangaram" Released: 11 October 2023; 3. "Leelammo" Released: 25 October 2023

Track listing
No.	Title	Lyrics	Singer(s)	Length
1.	"Sittharala Sithravathi"	Ramajogayya Sastry	Rahul Sipligunj, Sravana Bhargavi	3:36
2.	"Hey Bujji Bangaram"	Ramajogayya Sastry	Armaan Malik, Yamini Ghantasala	3:54
3.	"Leelammo"	Kasarla Shyam	Nakash Aziz, Indravathi Chauhan	3:11

== Release ==
Aadikeshava was released on 24 November 2023.

=== Home media ===
The film's digital rights were bought by Netflix, and the satellite rights were bought by Star Maa. The film premiered on Netflix on 22 December 2023 in Telugu along with dubbed versions in Tamil, Kannada and Malayalam.

== Reception ==
=== Critical response ===
The film is criticized for being completely nonsensical with logicless scenes and the actors not realizing how horrible the movie they are acting in. Sangeetha Devi Dundoo of The Hindu found the film "unintentionally hilarious" and found it a relief that the film does not last very long.

NTV gave the film 2/5 stars and wrote "Aadikeshava is one movie that seems like makers had belief in an old adage, “Watch 10 films and write one. The movie feels so outdated that even 90’s films look contemporary in comparison to this film. The twists and turns, trying to replicate Boyapati Srinu and Trivikram Srinivas styles, doesn’t mix well." Avad Mohammad of OTTPlay gave 2/5 stars and wrote "Aadikeshava is a very routine and outdated action drama that does not showcase anything novel. Barring a few romantic and comedy scenes featuring the lead pair, the action is so over the top that the masses will also find it difficult to sit through."

Raghu Bandi of The Indian Express gave 1.5/5 stars and wrote "The subject and the writing in Aadikeshava by debutant Srikanth N Reddy have nothing original to offer and feel bland. There is no need to hurry to the theatres to catch this film as it might reach OTT soon." Abhilasha Cherukuri of Cinema Express gave 1.5/5 stars and wrote "Aadikeshava still manages to remind one of how comforting tropes can be. It is only when the tropes are not spun well enough, the illusion of entertainment falls apart, only to find reality break and enter."
