= Vijay 69 =

Indian drama film

- Official release poster
- Directed by: Akshay Roy
- Written by: Akshay Roy; Additional Dialogues: Abbas Tyrewala
- Produced by: Maneesh Sharma
- Starring: Anupam Kher; Chunky Pandey; Mihir Ahuja
- Cinematography: Sahil Bhardwaj
- Edited by: Manas Mittal
- Music by: Gaurav Chatterji
- Production company: YRF Entertainment
- Distributed by: Netflix
- Release date: 8 November 2024
- Running time: 112 minutes
- Country: India
- Language: Hindi

Vijay 69 is a 2024 Indian Hindi-language comedy-drama film written and directed by Akshay Roy. Produced by YRF Entertainment, the film stars Anupam Kher in the titular role alongside Chunky Pandey and Mihir Ahuja. It was released on 8 November 2024 on Netflix and received mixed-to-positive reviews.

== Plot ==
Vijay Mathews, a 69-year-old retired swimming coach living in Delhi, leads a quiet, isolated life after the death of his wife. His routine becomes increasingly sedentary and his only regular companion is his longtime friend Prakash, who teases him about growing complacent in old age.

While sorting his late wife's possessions, Vijay finds her journal containing a list of hopes she imagined for him, including a challenge to complete a triathlon. Moved by her faith in him, Vijay resolves to honour her memory by attempting the event despite his advancing years and declining health.

Vijay begins a cautious training regimen: short jogs, swimming practice and cycling, but soon confronts the realities of ageing: breathlessness, joint pain and recurring injuries. His efforts draw scepticism and mockery from some neighbours, while Prakash offers wry support. Seeking professional help, he approaches Kabir, a young personal trainer at a local gym, who is at first dismissive but ultimately agrees to train him.

The training is arduous and punctuated by setbacks: an old knee injury flares, Vijay collapses from exhaustion, and his family urges him to abandon the attempt on medical grounds. With Kabir's adjusted programme and emotional support from Prakash, Vijay persists, overcoming moments of doubt and experiencing gradual physical improvement.

On race day he faces the standard triathlon sequence: a 1.5-kilometre swim, a 40-kilometre cycle and a 10-kilometre run. He is competing as the oldest entrant. He endures a panic during the swim after a collision, severe knee pain on the cycle, and a gruelling final run, but is spurred on by supporters at the roadside and memories of his wife.

Vijay completes the course to widespread admiration and is recognised as the oldest finisher. The achievement restores his sense of purpose and brings emotional closure; Kabir learns the value of perseverance and Prakash publicly celebrates Vijay's transformation, with the film emphasising that age need not bar one from pursuing long-held aspirations.

== Cast ==
- Anupam Kher as Vijay Matthews
- Chunky Pandey as Fali
- Mihir Ahuja as Aditya
- Guddi Maruti as Parminder Bakshi
- Ekavali Khanna as Anna Matthews, Vijay's wife
- Vrajesh Hirjee as Coach Vishwas
- Kunal Vijaykar as Kishore
- Sulagna Panigrahi as Deeksha, Vijay's daughter
- Ravish Desai as Abhimanyu, Deeksha's husband
- Dharmendra Gohil as Akash, Aditya's father
- Anirban Bhattacharyya as Doctor
- Ketika Sharma as Malti
- Ashwin Mushran as Jaag
- Pawan Chopra
- Adrija Sinha as Ruhi
- Vivek Sagar as Jiten Mukhi
- Paritosh Sand as Ranjit Kumar
- Abhhay Joshi as Sunil Saxena
- Saanand Verma as Corrupt journalist

== Reception ==
On the review aggregator website Rotten Tomatoes, 60% of 10 critics' reviews are positive, with an average rating of 6.6/10.

Dehaval Roy of The Times of India rated the film 3/5 and wrote, "Despite [its] flaws, Vijay 69 is still a family-friendly entertainer that is worth watching once, especially if you’re in the mood for a light, feel-good story with a touch of comedy". A critic from The Hindu wrote "With little to reflect upon, it feels like an advertisement to promote triathlon, the new fad among fitness enthusiasts in all age groups". A critic from Firstpost wrote "No doubt, Vijay 69 is predictable to the core, but it does bring a smile to our face especially when we see our aging parents giving up on life". Rishabh Suri of the Hindustan Times wrote, "Vijay 69 is one of those films which people start watching with great interest, then lose it, scroll through their phones, watch a couple of scenes, go about some chores around the house, come back to watch the climax, and the end". A critic from Filmfare rated the film 3.5/5 and wrote, "The film will leave you with a smile on your face and a renewed belief in the power of perseverance, making it a truly heartwarming experience". A critic from Bollywood Hungama rated the film 3/5 stars and wrote, "On the whole, VIJAY 69 is a light-hearted inspirational tale that works due to the relatability factor, Anupam Kher's marvellous performance and an emotional climax".
