= Lakshyam =

Lakshyam (lit. 'aim') may refer to:

- Lakshyam (1972 film), a 1972 Indian Malayalam film
- Lakshyam (2007 film), a 2007 Indian Telugu action film
- Lakshyam (2017 film), a 2017 Indian Malayalam film

== See also ==
- Lakshya (disambiguation)
