= Tholi Prema (2018 film) =

2018 Indian Telugu romantic film by Venky Atluri

- Theatrical release poster
- Directed by: Venky Atluri
- Written by: Venky Atluri
- Produced by: B. V. S. N. Prasad
- Starring: Varun Tej; Raashii Khanna
- Cinematography: George C. Williams
- Edited by: Naveen Nooli
- Music by: S. Thaman
- Production company: Sri Venkateswara Cine Chitra
- Distributed by: Sri Venkateswara Films
- Release date: 10 February 2018
- Running time: 136 minutes
- Country: India
- Language: Telugu
- Box office: est. ₹45.1 crore

Tholi Prema (transl. First love) is a 2018 Indian Telugu-language romantic drama film written and directed by Venky Atluri in his directorial debut. Produced by B. V. S. N. Prasad's Sri Venkateswara Cine Chitra, the film stars Varun Tej and Raashii Khanna. The music is composed by S. Thaman while cinematography and editing are done by George C. Williams and Naveen Nooli respectively.

Principal photography of the film took place in Hyderabad and London. Released on 10 February 2018, the film grossed over ₹45 crore at the box office, and was a commercial success.

It was remade in Bengali language as Fidaa (2018), named after the 2017 Telugu film of the same name, which also stars Varun Tej.

== Plot ==
Aadi is searching frantically for a missing girl in London. Dejected, Adi sits by the River Thames and starts talking about how he is successful at work but his love life is a complete failure.

A few years back, Adi plots a revenge prank on his college professor for the 2 years of miserable college life despite being the top student. He escapes after a successful prank and heads straight to the train station to leave for Hyderabad. As the train leaves, his friends urge him to wait till his other friend bring him a coke bottle spiked with vodka dubbed as the 'Golden drop'. When the train starts leaving, his friends instigate him saying that he doesn't have the fortune to drink the last golden drop in Vizag to which Adi responds as "Challenge Accepted." He risks his life to get the coke bottle and almost gets hit by a lamp post before being pulled back inside the train by none other than Varsha.

He instantly falls in love with Varsha and tries to woo her through flirting but Varsha is a very reserved and innocent girl and tries to stay out of trouble. Adi immediately proposes his love to Varsha and expects an answer from her by the morning if not he won't get back on the train to which Varsha agrees. To his surprise when he wakes up, Varsha is nowhere to be found.

Adi is dejected as he can't forget her and searches high and low for her in all of Hyderabad to no luck. 3 months have passed and he joins his University but still has no idea where Varsha is. To his surprise, he finds Varsha enrolled in the same university as him all along. She later tells him that she enrolled in his university by paying a lot of money despite getting a free seat at another university, after seeing his admission letter on the night of their journey. She explains that she couldn't give him an answer on the train due to the fear of her father arriving early and he was still asleep. Since then, Varsha gives a lot of signs that she is in love with him but she doesn't say those 3 words to Adi which he tries extremely hard for until one day where she expresses her love in front of all their University mates. Their love blossoms but they eventually break up because of Adi's impulsive nature.

Six years have passed and Aditya has moved to London for his master's degree. He is a successful student, topping his university, but is unable to forget Varsha due to which he keeps rejecting any girl that is interested in him.

As if it's destiny, Varsha and Adi both meet each other again in his new workplace as Varsha is introduced as his superior. At first, Adi hates her and tries to make her life difficult but Varsha tries her best to be amicable. Slowly, they both start understanding each other and become friends. Varsha reveals to her friend that she still loves Adi and knows that Adi is still in love with her as those who pretend to be angry love you the most. Yet Adi on the other hand reveals to his friends that he is attracted to Varsha because she was his first love but he doesn't love her anymore and Varsha hears this from behind.

Varsha meets Adi for the last time and gives him a box with the things he gave her 6 years ago when they were in a relationship. She explains to him that despite being away from her for 6 years, 6000 miles away, he is still stuck on that incident that occurred for 6 minutes. She reiterates that he is incapable of changing his impulsiveness and she is finally done fighting for their love.

Adi opens the box and finds out that she kept the love he gave her and the hate he gave her and realizes that the box also had a graduation picture which he had only sent his mother. His mother reveals that after Adi left for London, Varsha came to visit her to apologise but at that time she thought of only protecting her son as a mother. Varsha came to visit her again after six years and revealed to his mother that she wants Adi and she still loves him and Adi's mother realised that her love was real. Adi's mother reminds Adi that Adi was angry enough to distance Varsha but was still in love with her to distance every other girl to come into his life. He realizes that he still loves her and runs back to find her, only to realise that Varsha is gone. He runs all over London trying to find her and finally sits dejected near the River Thames asking God for just one sign to help his love. The sound of a train bell jolts him as he figures out where she could be and finally finds her in a train station. He admits to Varsha that he didn't mean what he said when he said that he doesn't love her anymore just like how she didn't mean when she said that she hated him 6 years ago. The story ends with both embracing with a kiss as they reconcile and finally understand each other.

== Cast ==
- Varun Tej as Aditya Shekhar Alias “Adi”, Varsha's love interest
- Raashii Khanna as Varsha, Aditya's love interest
- Naresh as Thokka Buchi Babu
- Suhasini Maniratnam as Aditya's Mother
- Vidyullekha Raman as Godavari
- Priyadarshi Pullikonda as Ravi
- Hyper Aadi as Raju
- Apoorva Srinivasan as Kavita
- Satyam Rajesh as Prakash, Aditya's friend
- Sapna Pabbi as Sunaina (special appearance in song ‘Sunona Sunaina’)
- Viva Harsha as Aditya's childhood friend

== Soundtrack ==
Tholi Prema

Soundtrack album by S. Thaman
- Released: 20 January 2018
- Recorded: 2017
- Genre: Soundtrack
- Length: 28:22
- Language: Telugu
- Label: Aditya Music
- Producer: S. Thaman

S. Thaman chronology
Bhaagamathie (2018)	Tholi Prema (2018)	Inttelligent (2018)

This film has six songs composed by S. Thaman. The audio launch has been held in Hyderabad on 20 January 2018 through Aditya Music.

All lyrics are written by Sri Mani.

Tracklist
No.	Title	Singer(s)	Length
1.	"Ninnila"	Armaan Malik, S. Thaman	3:54
2.	"Break The Rules"	Raghu Dixit	4:06
3.	"Sunona Sunaina"	Rahul Nambiar	3:38
4.	"Allasani Vaari"	Shreya Ghoshal	4:56
5.	"Vinnane Vinnane"	Armaan Malik, Devan Ekambaram	4:05
6.	"Toliprema"	Kaala Bhairava	4:03
Total length:			28:22

== Release ==
Tholi Prema was released theatrically on 10 February 2018. The film later was dubbed in Hindi under the same title and Tamil as Manathil Nindraval - both in 2019, while a Kannada dub titled Modalne Preethi was released in 2023.

== Reception ==
=== Critical reception ===
Hemanth Kumar in his review for the Firstpost, gave 4 out of 5 stars and felt that the film is "not just a love story, but an experience", thereby praising the performances of the lead actors and lauded Venky Atluri in his directorial debut. Janani K in her review for India Today gave 3 out of 5 stars calls the film "refreshing to watch" and quoted the performances of Tej and Khanna as "incredible". Neeshita Nyayapati in her review for the Times of India, gave 3.5 out of 5 stars and called the film "an easy-breezy ride and purely for the romantic millennials. Give it a chance this weekend, it might just impress you with its big ol’ dose of reality".

The Hindu critic Sangeetha Devi Devi appreciated the film for its 'solid performances' and 'nuanced writing.' "The film is a win in many ways, and lingers long after it’s over," she added. Karthik Kumar of Hindustan Times gave 3.5 out of 5 stars and wrote: "It takes a lot for a first time director to make a love story, within the quintessential rom-com template followed in mainstream cinema, and yet, succeed in giving audiences the feeling of watching something fresh, something which is not a rehashed product." The Indian Express journalist Manoj Kumar R stated that the film has "nothing new to offer." However, he appreciated Atluri for right casting and keeping the audience entertained despite relying on the "overused plot devices of the romantic comedy genre."

=== Box office ===
The film has collected a total share of 54.0 million rupees in Nizam, 17.0 million in ceded, 04.3 million in Nellore, 11.4 million in Guntur, 10.7 million in Krishna, 0.93 in West, 11.8 million in East, 21.5 million in Uttar Andhra, 12.0 million in Karnataka and 23.0 million in the USA. The rest of the world is estimated around 08.0 million rupees.

The total Andhra Pradesh and Nizam gross is said to be 318 million while the share is 185.5 million. The gross in the US, Karnataka and the rest of India is said to be 71 million, 3.6 and 26 million. The share in USA, Karnataka and the rest of India is 32 million, 13 million, 09 million respectively. The total worldwide gross is 451 million and the share is 239.5 million.

== Awards and nominations ==
Date of ceremony	Award	Category	Recipient(s) and nominee(s)	Result	Ref.
6 January 2019	Zee Cine Awards Telugu	Favorite Debut Director	Venky Atluri	Won	
6 January 2019	Zee Cine Awards Telugu	Entertainer of the Year – Female	Raashii Khanna	Won	
6 January 2019	Zee Cine Awards Telugu	Favorite Music Director	S. Thaman	Won	
15 August 2019	South Indian International Movie Awards	Best Debut Director	Venky Atluri	Nominated	
15 August 2019	South Indian International Movie Awards	Best Cinematographer (Telugu)	George C. Williams	Nominated	
15 August 2019	South Indian International Movie Awards	Best Female Playback Singer (Telugu)	Shreya Ghoshal	Nominated	
21 December 2019	Filmfare Awards South	Best Male Playback Singer – Telugu	Armaan Malik for "Ninnila Ninnila"	Nominated	
