= Mr. Majnu =

2019 Indian Telugu romantic drama film

- Release poster
- Directed by: Venky Atluri
- Written by: Venky Atluri
- Produced by: B. V. S. N. Prasad
- Starring: Akhil Akkineni; Nidhhi Agerwal; Izabelle Leite
- Cinematography: George C. Williams
- Edited by: Naveen Nooli
- Music by: S. Thaman
- Production company: Sri Venkateswara Cine Chitra
- Distributed by: UTV Software Communications, IG Interactive Entertainment (United Kingdom)
- Release date: 25 January 2019
- Running time: 145 minutes
- Country: India
- Language: Telugu
- Box office: est. ₹210 million

Mr. Majnu (transl. 'Mr. Lover Boy') is a 2019 Indian Telugu language romantic comedy film written and directed by Venky Atluri, and produced by B. V. S. N. Prasad under Sri Venkateswara Cine Chitra. The film features Akhil Akkineni and Nidhhi Agerwal in lead roles. Upon release, the film received mixed reviews, with praise towards Akhil and Nidhhi's performance, and the soundtrack, but criticism towards the plot. The film became a commercial failure at the box-office.

The film had also been dubbed in Hindi and Kannada under the same title, and in Tamil as Maanidan. The film was remade in Odia with the same name, starring Babushaan Mohanty and Divyadisha Mohanty in the lead roles, which also took inspiration from the 2010 Tamil film Theeradha Vilaiyattu Pillai.

== Plot ==
Vikram Krishna alias Vicky is a handsome young man, who flirts with everyone and has never been in a serious relationship. Nikitha alias Nikki is a young woman, who dreams of having a husband like Lord Ram. One day, on the way to work, she sees a group of women, striking, not to suspend Vicky, who was caught red handed by the dean of the university while romancing with her daughter in her home.

Nikki gets disgusted on hearing about Vicky and says that he is a "dangerous character". Nikki's brother is marrying Vicky's younger sister, so Nikki is told to go for shopping with Vicky. A reluctant Nikki goes with him for shopping. Gradually, Nikki discovers Vicky's gentle side and falls for him. She confesses her love to Vicky and asks him to be in a relationship for two months. Vicky agrees after some hesitation and tells her not to inform both families. Vikky tells they may not end up together after two months, and this may cause trouble for his sister. Vikky soon becomes very uncomfortable with her over-enthusiastic relationship. She tries to change his lifestyle. Nikki accidentally tells their relationship to both families. They suddenly arrange marriage. Vikky confesses his hardship to his best friend Chitti. Nikki overhears their conversation and breaks up with him in front of everyone, thinking that she was nothing, but a burden on Vicky and also he was not happy with her.

After Nikki leaves for London, Vicky realises he truly loves Nikki and heads to London to prove his love for her. When Vicky reaches London, he learns that Nikki has told about him to everyone living in the colony in which she lives and being the colony's favorite, the whole colony including his uncle and Nikki's friends bear a grudge against him. He is introduced to them as Krishna by Pulla Rao, who lives in the same colony and starts befriending her family. Vicky tries multiple methods to show his love to her, but she disapproves all his efforts. After the disapproval, Vicky realizes that Nikki is adamant and will not take him back. He confesses the truth to Nikki's family and leaves for the airport to leave for India.

Nikki's family makes her realise her mistake and Vicky's love for her. Vicky had told his hardships only to his bestfriend, who is like a brother to him, but she told about him not just among families but to all neighbours making him villain. The efforts Vicky made were ignored by Nikki constantly. After realizing her mistake, Nikki leaves for the airport hurriedly to stop Vicky from leaving London. A hurrying Nikki parks her car by damaging the other and desperately searches for Vicky. Nikki notices Vicky talking with the girl with whom he has already flirted. Out of anger, Nikki approaches and slaps that girl. Vicky tells her that she was there to invite him at her wedding. After clearing all the misunderstandings, they reunite and get married. Later, the cops file a case on Nikki for damaging the car. Nikki tries to convince the officer that she did it accidentally. The officer asks them to have a talk with their superior, who is a lady. Nikki asks Vicky to have a talk. The film ends with Vicky preparing himself to seduce the lady officer, depicting that he will always be a lover boy.

== Cast ==
- Akhil Akkineni as Vikram Krishna "Vicky"
- Nidhhi Agerwal as Nikitha "Nikki"
- Izabelle Leite as Madhavi, Dean's daughter
- Kailash Reddy as Bobby
- Raja Chembolu as Kishore
- Zoha Rahman as Bobby's Girlfriend
- Naga Babu as Nikitha's father
- Subbaraju as Ramesh Babu, Nikitha's uncle
- Rao Ramesh as Siva Prasad, Vicky's uncle
- Jayaprakash as Krishna Prasad, Vicky's father
- Soundarya as Vicky's Deceased Mother (Portrait only)
- Ajay as Local Goon
- Pavitra Lokesh as Vicky's aunt
- Sithara as Nikitha's mother
- Priyadarshi Pullikonda as Chitti, Vicky's best friend
- Vidyullekha Raman as Linda, Nikki's friend
- Satya Krishnan as Nikki's sister-in-law
- Raghav Rudra Mulpuru as Vinod, Vicky's cousin
- Kadambari Kiran as Vicky's relative
- Hyper Aadi as Pulla Rao
- Satish Saripalli as Nikki's Uncle
- Ayvianna Snow as PC Snow
- Itish Prasad Adhikari as student
- S. Thaman as cameo appearance in "Koppamga Koppamga" song

== Soundtrack ==
Mr. Majnu

Soundtrack album by S. Thaman
- Released: 14 January 2019
- Recorded: 2018
- Genre: Soundtrack
- Length: 25:08
- Label: Sony Music India
- Producer: S. Thaman

S. Thaman chronology
Orange (2018)	Mr. Majnu (2019)	Simmba (2018)

Music composed by S. Thaman. Music released on Sony Music India. The Soundtrack of the film received positive response, especially the song "KopamGa KopamGa".

All lyrics are written by Sri Mani.

Track list
No.	Title	Singer(s)	Length
1.	"Mr. Majnu"	Ramya NSK	3:54
2.	"Naalo Neeku"	Shreya Ghoshal, Kaala Bhairava	4:21
3.	"Yemainado"	Armaan Malik	3:16
4.	"Hey Nenila"	Sruthiranjani	4.05
5.	"Koppamga Koppamga"	Armaan Malik & S. Thaman	4:34
6.	"Chiru Chiru Navvula"	Tushar Joshi, Koti Salur & Ramya Behara	4:56
Total length:			25:08

== Reception ==
The Times of India gave 3 out of 5 stars stating "It's Akhil who steadies this rocky ship, while composer Thaman remains the unsung hero of the film for its terrific music score. Be it energy, melody or a sense of calm, Thaman's music is a perfect anchor to the film's story. Mr Majnu may not be as heartwarming as Tholi Prema, but has every element in it to make for an engaging watch at the cinemas".

Firstpost gave 3 out of 5 stars stating "Mr Majnu some well-crafted sequences which allow the film to find its emotional core".

The Indian Express gave 2.5 out of 5 stars stating "The film aims to strengthen Akhil Akkineni's brand as a 'chocolate hero' and it works. He has played his role with confidence and swag, and makes even cheesy scenes click".
