= Lucky Baskhar =

2024 Indian film by Venky Atluri

- Theatrical release poster
- Directed by: Venky Atluri
- Written by: Venky Atluri
- Produced by: Suryadevara Naga Vamsi; Sai Soujanya
- Starring: Dulquer Salmaan; Meenakshi Chaudhary
- Cinematography: Nimish Ravi
- Edited by: Naveen Nooli
- Music by: G. V. Prakash Kumar
- Production companies: Sithara Entertainments; Fortune Four Cinemas; Srikara Studios
- Release date: 31 October 2024
- Running time: 151 minutes
- Country: India
- Language: Telugu
- Budget: ₹56 crore
- Box office: est. ₹111 crore

Lucky Baskhar (stylised as LUCKY BASKHA₹) is a 2024 Indian Telugu-language black comedy heist drama film written and directed by Venky Atluri. Produced by Sithara Entertainments, Fortune Four Cinema and Srikara Studios, the film stars Dulquer Salmaan in the titular role, alongside Meenakshi Chaudhary, Tinnu Anand, P. Sai Kumar, Ramki, Raghu Babu, Sarvadaman D. Banerjee, Sachin Khedekar and Y. Kasi Viswanath. The story follows a lower-middle-class man who begins engaging in financial scams after struggling to support his family while battling debt and humiliation.

The film was officially announced in May 2023 and its title followed in July. Principal photography commenced in October, predominantly in Hyderabad. The film has music composed by G. V. Prakash Kumar, cinematography handled by Nimish Ravi and editing by Naveen Nooli.

Lucky Baskhar released worldwide on 31 October 2024, coinciding with Diwali, to critical acclaim. It emerged as the most successful film of Salman's career, grossing ₹111 crore at the box office. It also won the state Gaddar Award for Third Best Feature Film.

== Plot ==
In 1992 Bombay, Baskhar Kumar is abruptly detained by CBI officials and taken to the Colaba branch of Magadha Bank. There, he faces interrogation regarding the alleged embezzlement of bank funds to facilitate securities fraud during his tenure. The true events of his ascent are revealed through a series of flashbacks, with Baskhar frequently breaking the fourth wall to provide cynical commentary to the audience.

Three years earlier, Baskhar works as a low-salaried cashier at Magadha Bank, one of the few private financial institutions left after nationalisation. To supplement his meager income, he charges uneducated clients small fees to write cheques and fill out bank forms. He lives in tight financial strain with his wife Sumathi—who estranged herself from her wealthy family to marry him and dreams of launching a home catering business—their young son Karthik, and his father Prahalad. Prahalad, a former chartered accountant, became paralyzed and chose voluntary muteness after being ruined by a business scam. Hounded by persistent creditors, Baskhar's desperation peaks when a major creditor seizes his scooter, and he is bypassed for a long-awaited promotion.

In a bid to turn his fortunes around, Baskhar steals ₹2 lakh from the bank's daily deposits. He hands the cash to Anthony, a local smuggler who needs capital to clear a seized shipment of illegally imported television sets at the port. Working with Samba, a bank peon, Baskhar successfully retrieves and resells the TVs, doubling the money. They quietly replace the stolen bank funds and pocket a massive profit. Over the following months, successive smuggling runs allow Baskhar to liquidate his debts and dramatically elevate his family's standard of living.

Anthony proposes one final, high-stakes shipment of three luxury foreign cars worth ₹10 lakh before retiring to join his son's hotel business in the United States. Though hesitant, Baskhar agrees to secure the cash. The plan hits a major snag when their prospective buyer is arrested, forcing Baskhar and Samba to transport the vehicles to a dealer in Goa over a weekend. By disguising the vehicles as government transport and hiring beggars and an exotic dancer to play politicians and an escort, they successfully bypass highway checkpoints. Baskhar returns the stolen money just in time, only to find that the bank's top managers have been arrested for independent fraudulent activities. While this increases regulatory scrutiny, the sudden management vacuum allows Baskhar to finally secure his promotion and a higher salary. He subsequently retires from smuggling, though Samba continues.

As the new Assistant General Manager, Baskhar discovers that prominent market speculator Harsha Mehra is illegally routing Magadha Bank's funds to manipulate stock prices, bribing senior executives to look the other way. Recognizing an opportunity, Baskhar strikes a deal with Suraj, a broker for Katari Bank and Mehra’s close associate. In exchange for clearing fraudulent bank receipts, Baskhar receives a cut of the funds and insider stock tips. He cleanses his astronomical market earnings through an unscrupulous hawala network, first masking the wealth with a faked lottery win and later using Sumathi's rapidly expanding home-food enterprise as a money-laundering front.

The influx of massive wealth transforms Baskhar into an arrogant, detached man, deeply fracturing his marriage. In disgust, Sumathi intentionally damages her business. Prahalad suddenly breaks his years of silence to reveal he has been aware of the financial crimes all along, warning his son of the destructive cycle of greed. When Sumathi accidentally overhears Baskhar discussing the money-laundering scheme, she cuts off all emotional ties with him. Re-evaluating his choices, a humbled Baskhar begs for her forgiveness and begins to mend his character, especially after having to bail out a broke and arrested Samba.

The scheme unravels when Baskhar discovers that Harsha Mehra has forged bank letters from Katari Bank to siphon even larger sums, an act of stress that causes Katari Bank's General manager, Hariharan, to suffer a fatal heart attack in his office. Horrified, Baskhar refuses to cooperate with Suraj any further. Despite heavy pressure from Magadha Bank's corrupt leadership, he reports the massive fraud to the Reserve Bank of India (RBI) and resigns after refusing to sign off on the latest transactions.

The CBI interrogation in 1992 is revealed to be a trap. The corrupt officers are actually on the payroll of Magadha Bank's Chairman and General Manager, who received the lion's share of Mehra's illicit payouts. Holding Baskhar hostage, they threaten his family and demand he sign backdated transfer slips using his personal accounts to cover up the missing funds before an upcoming RBI audit the next morning.

The next day, however, the executives discover that Baskhar had already closed his accounts, rendering the forced documents legally useless. Baskhar's prior whistleblowing triggers a massive, coordinated raid by RBI agents, bringing down Harsha Mehra's financial empire and resulting in the immediate arrest of Magadha Bank's corrupt leadership. Meanwhile, Baskhar and his family safely flee India. Utilizing Anthony's resources and Prahalad's old professional connections, Baskhar secures an American Investment visa by purchasing a luxury hotel in Boston, where the family resumes their affluent lifestyle abroad.

== Cast ==
- Dulquer Salmaan as Baskhar Kumar, cashier and later Assistant General Manager of Magadha Bank, Colaba. He later becomes the owner of Hotel Bhaskar International, America
- Meenakshi Chaudhary as Sumathi, Baskhar's wife
- Tinnu Anand as Rajbir Lokhande, Chairman of Magadha Bank
- P. Sai Kumar as CBI Officer Laxman Rao
- Ramki as Anthony, an import dealer
- Raghu Babu as beggar
- Maanasa Choudhary as Mona, a dancer (cameo)
- Sarvadaman D. Banerjee as Prahalad Kumar, Baskhar's father
- Kalyani as Ramya Dikshit, RBI Director
- Sachin Khedekar as Vinod Bhosle, General Manager of Magadha Bank, Colaba ( Voice Dubbed by Subhalekha Sudhakar )
- Kasi Viswanath as Athish Kulkarni, ex-Assistant Regional Manager of Magadha Bank, Colaba
- Sudha as Sumathi's mother and Baskhar's mother-in-law
- Rajkumar Kasireddy as Samba, Bhaskar's best friend
- Prabhas Sreenu as a visa consultant
- Hyper Aadi as a Stock Market Broker
- Sivannarayana Naripeddi as Narayanan, Vault Manager of Magadha Bank, Colaba
- Gayatri Bhargavi as Latha K, Baskhar's colleague at Magadha Bank, Colaba
- Mathew Varghese as S. Hariharan, General Manager of Katari Bank
- Srinath Maganti as Suraj
- Micky Makhija as Himanshu Roy, Regional Manager of Magadha Bank, Colaba
- Srikanth Reddy
- Manava Koteshwar Rao
- Lab Sharath
- Ram Sandeep Varma Jampana
- Anji Chodapaneedi
- Rahul
- Mahesh Achanta as a stock market analyst
- Manik Reddy as Patel Bhai
- Mukhtar Khan as Captain George
- S. P. Prabhu
- Kishore Raju Vasistha AGM
- Krishna Kamal as Anwar, Accountant of Sumathi Home Foods
- Shashidhar as Sumathi's elder brother
- Ananya Sharma as Baskhar's younger sister
- Rithvik as Karthik, Baskhar and Sumathi's son
- Charan Lakkaraju as Baskhar's younger brother
- Surya Sreenivas as Sandeep, Baskhar's brother-in-law
- Jayasri Rachakonda
- Pravalika Chukkala as Sumathi's Sister-in-Law

== Production ==
=== Development ===
After the success of Vaathi in early 2023, it was reported that Venky Atluri had narrated a script to Dulquer Salmaan which impressed him and the project would be funded by S. Naga Vamsi and Sai Soujanya's Sithara Entertainment, Fortune Four Cinemas and Sithara Studios. The company made a public announcement on 15 May 2023, confirming the project, and also stating that filming would begin the following October and would be released in the Summer (June–August 2024). The film's official title, Lucky Bashkar, was announced on 28 July 2023. The casting for the film was managed by Vicky Kisan Mourya.

=== Filming ===
Principal photography began with the first schedule on 4 October 2023 in Hyderabad.

== Soundtrack ==
The music of the film was composed by G. V. Prakash Kumar. The audio rights were acquired by Aditya Music.

== Release ==
=== Theatrical ===
Lucky Baskhar was released worldwide on 31 October 2024, coinciding Diwali along with dubbed versions in Tamil, Malayalam and Hindi languages. It was initially scheduled to be released in the month of July 2024 but was postponed to release on 27 September 2024. Furthur, it was preponed to 7 September 2024 coinciding with Vinayaka Chavithi but was again postponed.

=== Home media ===
The film began streaming on Netflix from 28 November 2024 in Telugu and dubbed versions of Tamil, Malayalam, Kannada and Hindi languages. Star Maa acquired Telecasting rights.

== Reception ==
=== Critical response ===
Lucky Baskhar received critical acclaim from critics.

Paul Nicodemus of The Times of India gave 3.5/5 stars and wrote:"Lucky Baskhar emerges as a captivating period crime thriller, blending a nostalgic backdrop with a tale of human ambition and resilience." Sashidhar Adivi of Times Now gave 3.5/5 stars and wrote "Lucky Bhaskar is a perfect blend of emotions and clever financial themes. It is tough to craft this kind of drama." Janani K of India Today gave 3/5 stars and wrote "Lucky Baskhar works for the major part because of Venky Atluri’s attention to detail and superlative performances."

Sangeetha Devi Dundoo of The Hindu wrote: "Director Venky Atluri strikes a fine balance between exploring financial scam and relationships in Lucky Baskhar, headlined by a superb Dulquer Salmaan."

=== Box office ===
Lucky Baskhar became Dulquer's first film to reach the ₹100 crore (US$11 million) mark.

== Accolades ==
Award (Note: Awards, festivals and organizations are in alphabetical order.)	Date of ceremony (Note: Date is linked to the article about the awards held that year, wherever possible.)	Category	Recipient(s)	Result	Ref.
Telangana Gaddar Film Awards	14 June 2025	Third Best Feature Film	Suryadevara Naga Vamsi & Sai Soujanya (Producers of Lucky Baskhar)	Won	
Telangana Gaddar Film Awards	14 June 2025	Best Screenplay	Venky Atluri	Won	
Telangana Gaddar Film Awards	14 June 2025	Best Editor	Naveen Nooli	Won	
Telangana Gaddar Film Awards	14 June 2025	Special Jury Award	Dulquer Salmaan	Won	
National Film Awards	September 2026/ To be confirmed	National Film Award for Best Screenplay – Dialogue Writer	Venky Atluri	Won	
