= Lakshya (2021 film) =

2021 film by Santhossh Jagarlapudi

- Theatrical release poster
- Directed by: Santhossh Jagarlapudi
- Written by: Santhossh Jagarlapudi
- Produced by: Narayan Das Narang; Puskur Ram Mohan Rao; Sharrath Marar
- Starring: Naga Shaurya; Jagapathi Babu; Ketika Sharma; Sachin Khedekar
- Cinematography: Raam Reddy
- Edited by: Junaid Siddiqui
- Music by: Kaala Bhairava
- Production companies: Sri Venkateswara Cinemas; Northstar Entertainment
- Release date: 10 December 2021
- Running time: 152 minutes
- Country: India
- Language: Telugu
- Box office: ₹4.5 crore

Lakshya (transl. Target) is a 2021 Indian Telugu-language sports drama film written and directed by Santhossh Jagarlapudi. It is produced by Sri Venkateswara Cinemas and Northstar Entertainment. The film stars Naga Shaurya, Jagapathi Babu, Ketika Sharma and Sachin Khedekar. The film was released on 10 December 2021.

== Plot ==
Pardhu is a gifted archer since his childhood. His grandfather notices it and spends all his earnings to admit him in Hyderabad's best archery academy. Pardhu's exemplary performance helps him easily become the state champion. He falls in love with Rithika. Pardhu becomes depressed due to the sudden demise of his grandfather and becomes addicted to drugs. He eventually realises that someone planned his downfall and introduced him to drugs through his friends. In a subsequent fight, they break his hand and he falls unconscious. However, he reaches the stadium in time to participate in finals but falls unconscious. He gets suspended after thrashing a fellow archer amid allegations of doping, while Rithika breaks up with him when he shoves her father to the ground.

After losing everything and everyone dear to him, Pardhu becomes an alcoholic but Parthasaradhi, his father's friend, enters his life who motivates him to fight on. Pardhu trains hard with the hope that someday his right hand would work. He reconciles with Rithika and prepares to participate in the World Championships. He is shocked to learn that his right hand will never heal fully. But Parthasaradhi points out that his left hand is equally competent for archery and he needs to train his mind to cope with it. Pardhu convinces the board and participates in the championship tournament. He finally wins a medal, fulfilling his grandfather's dream.

== Cast ==
- Naga Shaurya as Pardhu
- Jagapathi Babu as Parthasaradhi
- Ketika Sharma as Rithika
- Satya Sai Srinivas as Rithika's father
- Sachin Khedekar as Krishna, Pardhu's grandfather
- Shatru as Rahul
- Satya as Bala, Pardhu's friend
- Ravi Prakash as Pardhu's father
- Kireeti Damaraju as Rajesh

== Production ==
The film was tentatively titled as NS20. On 30 November 2020, the film's official title was unveiled as Lakshya. Principal photography of the film began on 16 September 2020 and was wrapped up on 30 August 2021.

== Music ==
Soundtrack album and background score of the film is composed by Kaala Bhairava.

Track listing
No.	Title	Lyrics	Music	Singer(s)	Length
1.	"O Lakshyam"	Rehman	Kaala Bhairava	Hymath Mohammed	3:57
2.	"Saya Saya"	Krishna Kanth	Kaala Bhairava	Junaid Kumar	3:54
Total length:					7:51

== Reception ==
Thadhagath Pathi of The Times of India rated the film 3/5 and called Lakshya "an interesting sports drama with minor flaws." In addition to the performances, Pathi appreciated the director for not dwelling on "jingoism or unnecessary commercial elements." While praising Shaurya's acting and archery backdrop, Sangeetha Devi Dundoo of The Hindu wrote, "The film moves at a snail’s pace and predictable lines; the only engaging factor is archery, a sport we haven’t explored in films." In another mixed review, The New Indian Express critic Ram Venkat Srikar stated: "Lakshya surely has the focus, but like the protagonist, who falls prey to substance abuse, the script too falls prey to predictability."
