= Uppena =

2021 Indian Telugu-language film by Bucchi Babu

- Theatrical release poster
- Directed by: Buchi Babu Sana
- Written by: Buchi Babu Sana
- Produced by: Naveen Yerneni; Yalamanchili Ravi Shankar
- Starring: Panja Vaisshnav Tej; Krithi Shetty; Vijay Sethupathi
- Cinematography: Shamdat Sainudeen
- Edited by: Naveen Nooli
- Music by: Devi Sri Prasad
- Production companies: Mythri Movie Makers; Sukumar Writings
- Release date: 12 February 2021
- Running time: 147 minutes
- Country: India
- Language: Telugu
- Budget: ₹22 crore
- Box office: est. ₹100 crore

Uppena (transl. High tide) is a 2021 Indian Telugu-language romantic drama film written and directed by debutant Buchi Babu Sana. Produced by Mythri Movie Makers and Sukumar Writings, it stars debutants Panja Vaisshnav Tej and Krithi Shetty alongside Vijay Sethupathi in a prominent role. Set in Kakinada, the plot follows fisherman Aasi, who falls in love with Bebamma. Her father Raayanam is an influential zamindar, who fiercely protects his daughter to safeguard his family's honour.

After a launch ceremony in January 2019, the makers commenced the principal shoot in May 2019, with film being shot in Kakinada, Hyderabad, Puri, Kolkata and Gangtok and wrapped up in January 2020. The music is composed by Devi Sri Prasad, with cinematography and editing by Shamdat and Naveen Nooli respectively. The film was originally slated to release on 2 April 2020, but was postponed due to the COVID-19 pandemic.

The film was released theatrically on 12 February 2021 and was a major commercial success at the box office. It won the Best Feature Film in Telugu at the 69th National Film Awards, and the state Gaddar Award for Third Best Feature Film. It became the highest grossing debut film in the history of Telugu film industry.

== Plot ==
Set in 2002 in the village of Uppada near Kakinada, Raayanam is an influential zamindar who goes to any extent to safeguard his family's honour. His daughter Sangeetha, fondly called Bebamma is a college student whom he fiercely protects. Raayanam plans to build a shipping yard in his village by razing fishermen's houses on the coast. Aasi is the son of one such fisherman Jalayya, and is a lower caste Christian. He falls head over heels for Bebamma. Bebamma also begins to like Aasi after watching him fight in the bazaar. Aasi follows Bebamma daily en route to her college on the bus. One day, the bus breaks down and the driver asks Aasi to drop Bebamma, the only passenger of the bus, at college. Later, the couple begins to meet daily at the beach and soon fall in love with each other.

Meanwhile, the breeding season of the fish arrives and no one is allowed to venture into the sea for over a month and a half. Bebamma, however, asks Aasi to take her into the sea, which he obliges. As the boat runs out of fuel, they get stuck in the sea. On the same night, Raayanam orders to raze the houses on the coast but he is worried that his daughter hasn't returned home. Raayanam secretly meets Jalayya and asks him to find his missing daughter, in exchange, his house will be spared. Aasi and Bebamma spend the night together on boat with fuel out of order and slowly consummate their relationship and have sex on the boat. Jalayya finds them the next morning and admonishes Aasi. He returns Bebamma to her father but lies that she was found alone on the boat.

Raayanam, however, is determined to find Bebamma's partner. He finds a shirt in Bebamma's wardrobe by which he tracks him down as Aasi. Raayanam's men attack Aasi and his father at the village mela, and Jalayya dies in strife. The following day, Bebamma runs away from her house and asks Aasi to elope with her. He reluctantly agrees, and they board a train to Orissa escaping Raayanam's men. From there, the couple travels to Kolkata, and later to Gangtok. Aasi picks up odd jobs and keeps Bebamma in a hostel until they move in together.

Several months pass by. Raayanam has promised his sister that her son shall be married to Bebamma within six months. All the days when Bebamma is away, Raayanam and his men pretend as if she was there to save his family's honour. Nearly six months after they elope, Aasi promises to marry Bebamma and takes her to a railway station. There, Raayanam's men kidnap Bebamma and bring her back to her father. Bebamma confesses to Raayanam that she had sex with Aasi that night on the boat and pleads to let her go. But Raayanam doesn't budge saying he would never let his daughter marry a lower caste, which he considers a dishonour. He says it was Aasi who disclosed their location to him. Raayanam also reveals that he had castrated Aasi and his father died of a heart stroke by seeing that the night before Bebamma and Aasi eloped. Raayanam believes she would not go back to Aasi because he has lost his manhood. However, Bebamma loves Aasi as a person, regardless of what he did to him. She says neither Raayanam nor Aasi is the one who can judge the manhood of a person. Bebamma adds that manhood is not related to any organ but to a man's personality. Raayanam is moved and lets her go. Bebamma and Aasi reunite.

== Cast ==
- Panja Vaisshnav Tej as Aasirvadham "Aasi"
  - Master Raghavan as Young Aasirvadham "Aasi"
- Krithi Shetty as Sangeetha "Bebamma" (Voice dubbed by RJ Swetha).
- Vijay Sethupathi as Kotagiri Sesha Raayanam, Sangeetha's father (Voice dubbed by P. Ravi Shankar)
- Sai Chand as Jalayya, Aasi's father
- Mamilla Shailaja Priya as Raayanam's sister
- Gayatri Jayaraman as Sangeetha's mother
- Ramaraju as Raayanam's father
- Rajeev Kanakala as a mandal revenue officer
- Kancharapalem Raju
- Naga Mahesh as Govindu
- Jai Krishna as Thalimpu
- Ravi Varma
- Rajsekar Aningi as Bus driver

== Production ==
=== Development ===
In mid-October 2018, Sukumar decided to back the project of the untitled film, helmed by his former assistant Buchi Babu Sana, in his directorial debut. Mythri Movie Makers, eventually collaborated with Sukumar Writings, the director's home banner, to co-produce the film. The makers roped Panja Vaisshnav Tej to play the lead role, marking his debut in film industry, and Sukumar's regular collaborator Devi Sri Prasad, was roped in to score music for the film.

The film is reportedly set in backdrop of Kakinada, Andhra Pradesh, and deals with the issue of honor killings, with Vaisshnav Tej, essaying the role of a fisherman. On 6 May 2019, the makers revealed the film's title as Uppena. Initially, it was speculated that the film would be titled Jalari, the title Uppena was finalised and registered in the Film Chamber.

=== Casting ===
In an interview, director Buchi Babu revealed that he wrote the story with an empty mind. Then, he decided to bring in Vaishnav Tej as he wanted a newcomer for the film and chose Vijay Sethupathi as he wanted someone who would take the film pan-India.

In March 2019, Vijay Sethupathi was roped in to play the antagonist, in his second Telugu film after Sye Raa Narasimha Reddy. In April 2019, the production house confirmed his inclusion in the film. Sethupathi was reported to play the heroine's father in the film. In July 2019, sources claimed that Sethupathi walked out of the project, and the reason was not disclosed. However, the rumours turned out to be false.

Initially, debutant actress Manisha Raj was announced as the lead actress during the film's launch event. However, the makers approached another teenage debutant Devika Sanjay (of Njan Prakashan fame), to play the lead role opposite Tej. In May 2019, the makers roped in Mangalore-based Krithi Shetty, to make her debut through this film.

=== Filming ===
The launch event of the film was held on 21 January 2019, at the office of Mythri Movie Makers, with Vaisshnav Tej's relatives, including actors Chiranjeevi, Nagendra Babu, Allu Aravind, Allu Arjun, Sai Dharam Tej, Varun Tej, Niharika Konidela, among others, attending the event. Four months later, the principal photography of the film started on 25 May 2019. The film was shot for 35 days in Kakinada. On 21 August 2019, Vijay Sethupathi joined the sets and it was reported that 40 percent of the film was completed. The film was later shot in Hyderabad, which was completed in late-September 2019. The second schedule took place in October 2019 for 90 days at Puri, Kolkata and Gangtok. Few scenes were shot at Jagannath Temple, Puri. In January 2020, the makers completed the shooting of the film and started post-production work.

After Tamil actor Sethupathi deciding not to dub for his character in Telugu language citing his voice might not suit the character, director Buchi Babu Sana hired P. Ravi Shankar for the dubbing of the character. He completed the dubbing work in three days in Hyderabad. Majority of the post-production work was completed by June 2020.

== Music ==
The soundtrack album and background score is composed by Devi Sri Prasad in his eighth collaboration with Sukumar. The soundtrack album was released on 17 February 2021 during the success meet of the film at Rajahmundry, Andhra Pradesh. The album was a huge hit, especially "Nee Kannu Neeli Samudram" and "Jala Jala Jalapaatham Nuvvu" tracks received wide response and were featured in national music charts.

== Themes and influences ==
The film showcased many social issues that were common in India, like, honor killings, casteism, economic inequality, etc. A reviewer of Telugucinema.com described that "'Uppena' talks about two things in particular – paruvu (casteism/honor) and magatanam (masculinity). At the very beginning of the story, Babyamma's teacher explains the true meaning of a being man. When the girl students laugh at the picture of a male organ, the lecturer gives a new definition of manliness." Another reviewer from IndiaGlitz stated "The 'magathanam' reference is integral to the story of the film. Many are of the view that the film is going to spark a change in the way masculinity is projected in Telugu movies. A number of Netizens have felt that toxic masculinity will give way to healthy masculinity in our movies now that 'Uppena' is on its way to becoming a blockbuster."

Director Buchi Babu Sana in an interview to The Indian Express said – "We might not talk about it or put it across in as many words, but casteism is an intrinsic part of our lives. You can see it in the way people interact with others who are from a different caste. The whole idea of Uppena is to drive home the point that love is beyond all these boundaries of casteism and class."

Priyanka Kanoj of International Business Times asked about film's story being similar to 2016 Marathi film Sairat (as well as the 2004 Kollywood-film Kaadhal), to which Tej replied – "Sairat is one of the most amazing movies I've watched. The actors, the establishment of roles, etc. can be termed as brilliance. I would definitely not draw any comparison between Sairat and Uppena. Of course, there are a number of movies with the same storyline, dealing with love and honor killing. But, the audience will definitely know that Uppena is a genuine story."

== Controversy ==
The film includes sexually intimate scenes between the lead actors. At the time of filming, Krithi Shetty, who played the lead actress was a minor.

== Release ==
Uppena was originally scheduled for a theatrical release on 2 April 2020, on the occasion of Rama Navami. But the release was postponed due to the COVID-19 pandemic lockdown in India. In May 2020, the makers reported that the film would not be released through OTT platforms, although digital rights of the film were sold to Netflix. After theatres began operating with 50% occupancy, the makers announced a release date of 12 February 2021, which falls on the Valentine's Day weekend. The film was later dubbed in Hindi by Goldmines Telefilms and premiered on their TV channel on 16 March 2025.

=== Distribution ===
Initially, in March 2020, the total pre-release business of the film was reported to be ₹15 crore. Later, in February 2021, the total pre-release business of the film was reported to be around ₹20.5–22 crore. The theatrical rights in Nizam, Ceded and Uttarandhra regions were acquired for ₹6, ₹3 and ₹10 crore respectively, with an overseas and the rest of India were at ₹1.5 crore together. Dil Raju–owned Sri Venkateswara Creations distributed the film in the Nizam region. Great India Films have acquired the theatrical distribution rights in the United States.

=== Home media ===
Digital rights of the film were acquired by Netflix at a reported amount of ₹7 crore. Digital premiere of the film was initially scheduled to 2 April 2021 and later postponed to 11 April 2021. But the film has finally premiered on 14 April 2021. The television broadcast rights of the film were acquired by Star Maa. The television premiere was broadcast on 18 April 2021. The first premiere on television registered a target rating point (TRP) of 18.51, while the second registered a TRP of 11.37.

=== Marketing ===
A pre-release event was held on 6 February 2021 for promoting the film in Hyderabad, with actor Chiranjeevi as the chief guest. A success meet was held on 17 February 2021 at Rajahmundry, with actor Ram Charan as the chief guest.

== Reception ==
=== Critical reception ===
Uppena received mixed reviews from critics, criticizing its plot, screenplay and length but praised the performances of the cast (especially Sethupathi's & Shetty's) & soundtrack by Devi Sri Prasad. Hemanth Kumar in his review for the Firstpost rated the film 2.75/5 and stated: "Uppena [..] explores what it means to love in a world defined by patriarchy and casteism, but it struggles to break free from several cliches." He also wrote, "The real drama, however, is on a deeper level, when it takes a deep dive into how society defines masculinity and virility. Uppena asks us if that's the only thing that matters in a man's life?" Reviewing the performances, The Times of India's Neeshitha Nyayapati wrote: "The debutants Vaisshnav and Krithi manage to pull off the intricacies of their characters well for the most part [..] Vijay Sethupathi is flawless as a man set in his beliefs and someone who's used to getting his way." She rated the film 3/5.

About the film's music and cinematography, The Hindu critic Sangeetha Devi Dundoo wrote: "The romance is poetic, with Devi Sri Prasad's lilting compositions matching the ebb and flow of the waves captured beautifully by Shamdat." Avinash Ramachandran of The New Indian Express rated 3/5 and opined, "We may have seen soft-spoken heroes before in Telugu films, but it is only recently that the very idea of masculinity is being questioned. For an industry that is built upon machismo, Uppena is an important and original film. It's a film that makes its women look at the men in their lives and talk about them being a walking corpus spongiosum. Now that's a huge wave of change."

The News Minute journalist Balakrishna Ganeshan, who rated the film one star out of five, found the film "deeply disturbing" and warned that the film has extreme violence. He added that the plot of the film was clichéd and "the director compensates for the boring sequences with a traumatic twist." A critic of The Hans India gave a rating of 2.5 out of 5 and praised the acting performances of every actor, cinematography, editing and film score, who finally wrote that "Uppena is a film that can appeal to only a few sections of the audiences." Pinkvilla opined that "the core idea that masculinity is not about anatomy is ennobling, the climax is not haunting enough. The film could have explored trauma and angst way better to make 'Uppena' a timeless film. While it is raw, it is not adequately shattering."

Deccan Chronicle's Sasidhar Ravi cited the film as "a routine tale with a crazy twist", appreciating the climax episode and the whole narration of the story and rated 2.5/5. Film Companion's Kartihk Keramulu in his review, compared the few scenes with films like Vada Chennai (2018), Colour Photo (2020) and Paava Kadhaigal (2020). He wrote that "The performances aside, there's a major flaw in the politics of Uppena. It forgives the perpetrator of the crime while it sympathizes with the survivor – while Raayanam is simply given a lesson on what love actually entails, he's not punished for the atrocities he commits".

=== Box office ===
On the opening day, the film grossed more than ₹15 crore at the box office, with a distributor share of ₹10.42 crore. The film grossed over ₹39.4 crore in the opening weekend. It surpassed the record of Ram Charan's Chirutha (2007) to become the highest-grossing Telugu film for a debut actor. By the end of its theatrical run, Sakshi Post reported that the film grossed over ₹83 crore, while The Indian Express estimated the gross to be ₹100 crore, earning a net profit of ₹57 crore.

== Accolades ==
Award (Note: Awards, festivals and organizations are in alphabetical order.)	Date of ceremony (Note: Date is linked to the article about the awards held that year, wherever possible.)	Category	Recipient(s)	Result	Ref.
69th National Film Awards	August 2023	Best Feature Film in Telugu	Buchi Babu Sana; Naveen Yerneni; Y. Ravi Shankar	Won	
Filmfare Awards South	9 October 2022	Best Film – Telugu	Naveen Yerneni, Y. Ravi Shankar	Nominated	
Filmfare Awards South	9 October 2022	Best Director – Telugu	Buchi Babu Sana	Nominated	
Filmfare Awards South	9 October 2022	Best Actor – Telugu	Panja Vaisshnav Tej	Nominated	
Filmfare Awards South	9 October 2022	Best Actress – Telugu	Krithi Shetty	Nominated	

== Remake ==
In February 2021, TV9 reported that the film will be remade in Hindi Language, with Ishaan Khatter and Ananya Panday in lead roles. and a Sri Lankan version was made"Ralla Weralata Adarei"
