= Panja Vaisshnav Tej =

Indian actor (born 1995)

Panja Vaishnav Tej
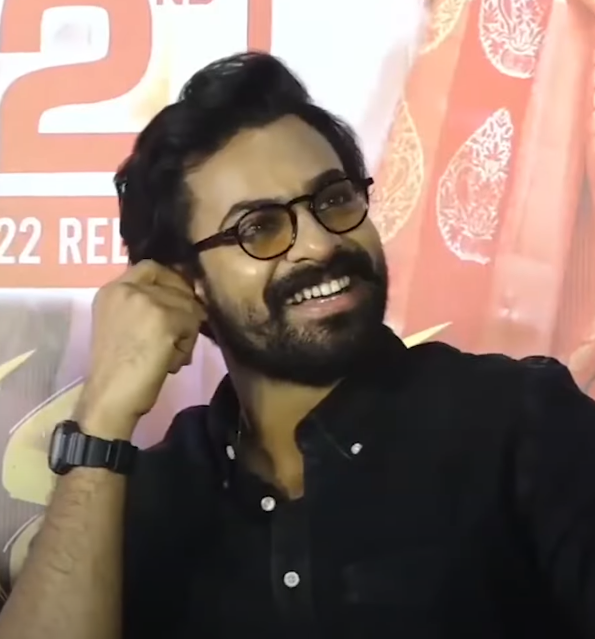
- Tej in 2022
- Born: Panja Vaishnav Tej; 13 January 1995 (age 31); Hyderabad, Andhra Pradesh (now in Telangana), India
- Education: St. Mary's College, Hyderabad
- Occupation: Actor
- Years active: 2003–2005; 2021-present
- Family: See Konidela–Allu family Sai Durgha Tej (brother)

Panja Vaishnav Tej (born 13 January 1995) is an Indian actor who works in Telugu films. He made his debut as a lead in the romantic drama Uppena (2021), which won him the Filmfare Award for Best Male Debut – South and SIIMA Award for Best Male Debut – Telugu, and later starred in the action thriller Konda Polam (2021) and the romance Ranga Ranga Vaibhavanga (2022). His second film, Konda Polam won a national award in 2023 from the Government of India.

== Early life ==
Panja Vaishnav Tej is the younger brother of Sai Dharam Tej. A member of the Konidela family, he is nephew of actor Chiranjeevi. Vaishnav Tej did his schooling at The Future kids School, Hyderabad and completed his graduation from St. Mary's College, Hyderabad.

== Career ==
Tej first appeared as a child actor in Johnny (2003), directed by and starring his maternal uncle Pawan Kalyan. He later played a wheelchair-ridden child in Shankar Dada M.B.B.S. (2004), starring his maternal uncle Chiranjeevi. In 2021, he made his debut as a lead with the film Uppena.

He then appeared in the rural drama, Konda Polam, co-starring Rakul Preet Singh, under the direction of Krish Jagarlamudi, which received mixed reviews from the critics. It was a huge flop at the box-office. It was followed by the romantic drama, Ranga Ranga Vaibhavanga, which was directed by debutant Gireeshaaya.

His next film, directed by debutant Srikanth N. Reddy and produced by Sithara Entertainments, was Aadikeshava, co-starring Sreeleela and released in 2023. He has signed a film under the production of Nagarjuna's Annapurna Studios.

== Filmography ==
Year	Film	Role	Notes	Ref.
2003	Johnny	Young Johnny	Child Actor	
2004	Shankar Dada M.B.B.S.	Sri Rama Chandra Murthy	Child Actor	
2005	Andarivaadu	Young Sidharth "Sidhu"	Child Actor	
2021	Uppena	Aasirvadham "Aasi"	Debut as Lead Actor	
2021	Konda Polam	Kataru Ravindranath "Ravi" Yadav		
2022	Ranga Ranga Vaibhavanga	Rishi		
2023	Aadikeshava	Balu/Rudra Kaleshwara Reddy		
