= Telangana Gaddar Film Awards =

Annual film awards by the Government of Telangana

Telangana Gaddar Film Awards (TGFA)
- Current: Telangana Gaddar Film Awards of 2024
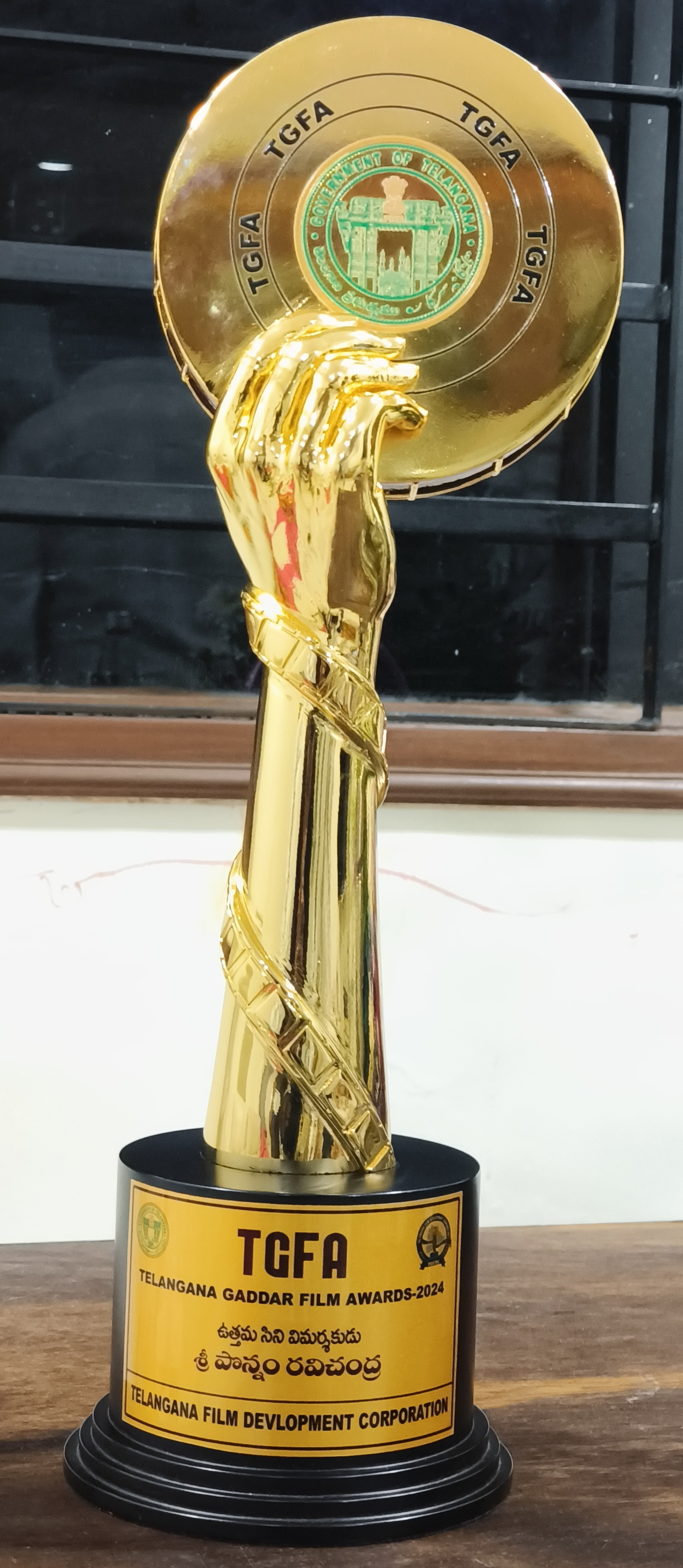
- Awarded for: Honouring the Excellence and achievements in Telugu cinema
- Sponsored by: Government of Telangana
- Location: HITEX Exhibition Centre, Hyderabad
- Country: India
- Presented by: Telangana Film Development Corporation (TGFDC)
- Status: Active
- Established: January 31, 2024; 2 years ago
- First award: 2025
- Final award: 2025
- Website: filmin.telangana.gov.in/fdc/TGFA.html

The Telangana Gaddar Film Awards (TGFA) are annual film awards presented by the Government of Telangana instituted in 2025. The awards are named after the Telugu poet and balladeer Gaddar. They are presented through the Telangana Film Development Corporation (TFDC) and recognise excellence in Telugu cinema in the years following the formation of the state of Telangana in 2014. These awards replace the Nandi Awards presented by the erstwhile Government of Andhra Pradesh.

The awardees are decided by an independent jury formed by the TFDC. The jury annually invites films for the award and analyses the submitted films before deciding the winners.

The award has attracted criticism on its launch, including the naming of the award, the manner of selection of the winners by jury members, and conferring an award to a propaganda film on its inaugural edition.

== History and background ==
Hyderabad, Telangana, is the home of Telugu cinema. Previously, it was part of the state of Andhra Pradesh that hosted the Nandi Awards. However, following the bifurcation of Andhra Pradesh in 2014, the newly formed state of Telangana lacked its own state film awards.

Efforts to revive the awards date back to 2017. The Government of Telangana, led by then Chief Minister K. Chandrashekar Rao, did not want to retain the erstwhile Nandi Awards, and considered introducing a new award. Deviating from the previous tradition of presenting the award on the festival of Ugadi, it was proposed to be awarded on the festival of Dasara. The then cinematography minister Talasani Srinivas Yadav announced that names such as Nemali, Simham, Kakatiya Kala Toranam and Palapitta were being considered for the annual film awards. However, the plans of instituting the award did not materialise.

On 31 January 2024, during a meeting commemorating the birth anniversary of balladeer Gaddar, Chief Minister Revanth Reddy officially announced the new Telangana State film awards. These awards, which will take the place of the Nandi Awards, are named Telangana Gaddar Film Awards, honouring the revolutionary Telugu poet and balladeer Gaddar. In March 2024, a committee was formed with B. Narsing Rao as chairman, and Dil Raju as vice-chairman, to frame guidelines for the awards.

Dil Raju, the chairman of Telangana Film Development Corporation (TFDC), announced the awards will be presented for films released in 2024 and will also retrospectively acknowledge the best films from 2014 to 2023, compensating for the lack of government-supported film awards since the formation of Telangana. On 13 March 2025, submissions for films for the inaugural ceremony of Telangana Gaddar Film Awards were invited across various categories, including individual artists and technicians for the year 2024.

== Trophy ==
The memento for the Telangana Gaddar Film Awards features a golden hand holding a traditional dappu, encircled with a film reel. The designer of the award, Ramavath Nayak, explained that "The hand signifies the people’s power to shape their lives and the dappu represents the beat of revolution, of collective justice. And the film reel ties it all to the power of storytelling through cinema."

== Juries and Rules ==
- Each year, Telangana Film Development Corporation (TGFDC) calls for submissions of Telugu-language films that have been censored and certified by Central Board of Film Certification (CBFC) between January 1 to December 31 of the year preceding the announcements of the awards.
- All Telugu-language films produced worldwide, including those produced by any Government agencies, will be eligible for the awards.
- The Government of Telangana establishes a separate jury, with the Chairman and Managing Director of Telangana Film Development Corporation Limited serving as the Member – Convener of the Committee, who will responsible for the selection of award recipients. The jury for the inaugural Telangana Global Film Awards (TGFA) was led by veteran actress Jayasudha.

== Categories ==
Awards are presented in 35 distinct categories, recognising outstanding achievements in Telugu cinema. The awards cover a wide spectrum: feature films, technical categories (direction, acting, cinematography, etc.), special categories (such as best children’s film, best film on heritage or environment), as well as honorary lifetime achievement awards. Urdu language films are also included for the first time in the Feature Film category. Awards are presented in the following categories:

=== Special awards ===
These awards are presented by Government of Telangana, based on the recommendations of the jury. Special awards carry a cash prize of ₹10.00 lakh, memento, and citation.

- NTR National Award for an eminent Film Artist for outstanding contribution to the growth and development of the Indian cinema
- Paidi Jairaj Film Award for an eminent Film Personality (other than Film Artist) for outstanding contribution to the growth and development of the Indian Cinema
- BN Reddy Film Award for an eminent Film Director for outstanding contribution to the growth and development of the Telugu Cinema
- Nagireddy and Chakrapani Film Award for an eminent Film Producer for outstanding contribution to the growth and development of the Telugu Cinema
- Kantha Rao Film Award for an eminent Telugu Film Artist for his outstanding contribution to Telugu cinema
- Raghupathi Venkaiah Film Award for an eminent film personality (other than artist) for his outstanding contribution to Telugu cinema
- C. Narayana Reddy Award for an eminent Poet, writer for outstanding contribution to the growth and development of Telugu cinema

=== Feature Films ===
- Best Feature Film – Gold, Silver and Bronze
- Best Feature Film in Urdu Language
- Best Feature Film on National Integration, Communal Harmony and Social Uplift of Depressed Classes
- Best Film on Environment / Heritage / History
- Best Debut Feature Film – Director
- Best Wholesome Entertainment Film (Dr. M. Prabhakar Reddy Uttama Prajadharana Chitram)
- Best Feature Film on Social Messaging
- Best Animation Film
- Best Special Effects Film
- Best Children's Film

=== Individual awards for artists and technicians ===
- Best Director
- Best Leading Actor
- Best Leading Actress
- Best Supporting Actor
- Best Supporting Actress
- Best Music Director
- Best Male Playback Singer
- Best Female Playback Singer
- Best Comedian
- Best Child Artist
- Best Story Writer
- Best Screenplay Writer
- Best Lyricist
- Best Cinematographer
- Best Editor
- Best Audiographer
- Best Choreographer
- Best Art Director
- Best Action Choreographer
- Best Make Up Artist
- Best Costume Designer
- Special Jury Award (4 No.s)

=== Documentary Films ===
- First Best Documentary Film
- Second Best Documentary Film
- Third Best Documentary Film
- Diploma of merit for Documentary Film

=== Short Films ===
- First Best Short Film
- Second Best Short Film
- Third Best Short Film
- Diploma of merit for Short Film

=== Books / Articles on Telugu Cinema ===
- Best Book on Telugu Cinema
- Best Critic on Telugu Cinema

== Award ceremonies ==
The inaugural edition of the Telangana Gaddar Film Awards was held on 14 June 2025 at the HITEX Exhibition Centre, Hyderabad. The event was attended by Telangana Chief Minister Revanth Reddy, Deputy Chief Minister Mallu Bhatti Vikramarka, Minister for Cinematography Komatireddy Venkat Reddy, and producer Dil Raju, who is also the chairman of the Telangana Film Development Corporation (TGFDC).

== Criticism ==
The opposition Bharatiya Janata Party criticised naming the Awards after Gaddar, as he was a former Maoist ideologue. "It sets a bad precedent. How is Gaddar, who followed a path of violence against elected governments, related to the film industry and its artistes? Why will actors and technicians be proud to hold on to an award that is named after such a person,” said BJP spokesperson Krishna Sagar Rao. However, the Congress Party defended their decision, with its spokesperson Syed Nizamuddin saying, "The BJP is raising some baseless allegations. The awards reflect the true spirit of inclusion."

The Telugu Film Chamber of Commerce (TFCC) has opted to hold its own film awards in opposition to the state government's Gaddar Film Awards. There has been further criticism regarding the naming of the awards after Gaddar, with one Telugu film producer saying, “It was not right to change the name of Nandi Awards to Gaddar Awards. Whether one likes it or not, Gaddar promoted Naxalism and fought against the state. There could have been one award in his name. Nandi was an ideal name without any controversy."

Arunank Latha and Ashok Danavath, who expressed their views on NewsClick, have raised concerns about whether the award genuinely honours Gaddar. "Using Gaddar’s name for political or commercial gain, without addressing the very injustices he fought against, amounts not to honour but to appropriation. To invoke his name without embodying his values is, ultimately, an act of disrespect," they added. They further stated that it was ironic that the same Nandi Awards he once rejected have now been renamed after him. The absence of Gaddar's portrait during the inaugural event, while portraits of Chief Minister and others were displayed, has also been criticised.

It was also reported that the winners for 2025 were allegedly selected based on "whims and fancies," with jury members only partially viewing a limited number of the nominated films. Additionally, concerns have been raised regarding the lack of representation from Telangana within the jury, as the majority of the 2025 jury members were from Andhra Pradesh.

Awarding the film Razakar: The Silent Genocide of Hyderabad (2024) in Best Feature Film in History category on its inaugural ceremony also drew criticism as the film was widely seen as a propaganda. In June 2025, a group of social activists have written a formal letter to the Telangana Government to withdraw the award presented to the film which they argued as "highly polarising" and "propaganda-driven."
