= Vaathi =

2023 film by Venky Atluri

- Theatrical release poster
- Directed by: Venky Atluri
- Written by: Venky Atluri
- Dialogues by: K. N. Vijayakumar (Tamil); Venkatesh (Tamil)
- Produced by: Naga Vamsi
- Starring: Dhanush; Samyuktha
- Cinematography: J. Yuvaraj
- Edited by: Naveen Nooli
- Music by: G. V. Prakash Kumar
- Production companies: Sithara Entertainments; Fortune Four Cinemas; Srikara Studios
- Distributed by: PVP Cinema; Seven Screen Studio; Sony Pictures; Skanda Cinemass; Einstin Media
- Release date: 17 February 2023
- Running time: 148 minutes
- Country: India
- Languages: Tamil; Telugu

Vaathi (transl. Teacher) is a 2023 Indian period action drama film written and directed by Venky Atluri and produced by Naga Vamsi. The film was simultaneously shot in Tamil and Telugu languages, with the latter version titled Sir. The film stars Dhanush, who plays the titular role of a school teacher, and Samyuktha. The music was composed by G. V. Prakash Kumar with cinematography by J. Yuvaraj and editing by Naveen Nooli. G. V. Prakash Kumar won the National Film Awards for the second time for Best Music Direction.

== Plot ==
Abhiram and his friends, studying at an educational institute run by Srinivas Tripati, are preparing for EAMCET examination, his father is trying to buy a management seat in engineering decided to sale his closed video shop who once very famous for Video records and also supplying for blue films. Their Abhiram and his friends came across an old box of cassette tapes containing mathematics classes with an accompanying receipt in the name of A.M.Kumar/A.S.Murthy from Cholavaram, from the year 1996. After inquiry, they discover that Kumar is the district magistrate of Kadapa, and later, Kumar discloses that the man in the video is Balamurugan 'Bala'/Balagangadhar Tilak "Balu".

Past: The plot moves back to 1993, when many private educational institutions sprang up and the government was finding it difficult to sustain interest in public educational institutions. Five years later, with government colleges shutting down due to a shortage of lecturers, the poor who cannot afford private institutions are left with little access to higher education. Srinivas Tripati, the president of the private colleges association, hatches a plan to adopt all the government colleges and send junior lecturers to those colleges, while obtaining support from the government to stop the regularization of fees by the government. Balu is one such lecturer, who is sent to a government junior college in Cholavaram to teach mathematics. Bala finds that the college is lacking in attendance, and due to this, the college may be shut down soon.

Bala organizes a meeting with all the villagers and their children and explains the necessity of education, thus making the children and parents realize its importance. The students then start to come back to classes with Bala handling additional classes and engaging an ex-student, Muthu/Satti gadu, to teach him as well by giving 10 rupees daily as his work is to study. Meanwhile, Bala falls in love with Meenakshi, the biology teacher at the institution. Bala notices that there are caste differences among students and he makes them realise their mistake and become more affecationate on each other. The final board exams take place, with all the students passing with first class distinction in their intermediate first year. Disappointed Srinivas tries to lure Bala away with a lucrative job offer to stop students from moving back to government institutions rather than private institutions. Bala refuses, and Srinivas acts via the education minister to take back the positions offered to lecturers at government junior colleges and recruit new ones, leaving Bala without a job.

Later, Bala takes private classes in an open field in the village, prompting outbursts from Srinivas, who instigates the villagers to drive him away from the village with the help of the village President Patti Papa Rao. Bala fights back but gets arrested and tortured in custody. He is dropped back into the village soon afterward, where the villagers are asked not to help him, indicating that he misused government school funds. Bala's students help him get back to his hometown, where he becomes dependent on his father, Narayana, who works as a driver, later he also losses his job showing the reason of his son. After recovering, he failed many job interviews at private junior colleges due to the unofficial ban on him in the association. Then He takes up tutoring at his home on the insistence of Ansari, his teacher, Meenakshi arrives proposes him for the marriage Bala accepts later Meenakshi explains the situation of students in the village.

Then Bala gets an idea and records his lectures using cassette tapes and sends them to Bhupathi/"Boothu" Bhushanam, Abhiram's grandfather, a photographer in Sozhavaram/Cholavaram and also owns a film theater. Bhupathi runs special shows for students at 6 p.m. in his theater, where Bala's lectures were played. To clear doubts and interact with students, Bala visits the village, under the guise of a drama artist, each Sunday, then Bala sets a target to them to crack EAMCET then the students started their preparation intensely. However Srinivas realises Bala is teaching the students secretly and he tries to stop the students on the day of the EAMCET exam. Bala fights them off and the students perform well, clearing the exam with top ranks in the state and to the surprise among them Muthu also wrote the exam and scored the first rank in the state and revealing himself as A.Muthu Kumar/Annavaram Satyanarayana Murthy. Then Thirupathi offers money to all the students, promising them sponsorship for their further studies on the condition that they endorse his institution. Bala asks the students to agree to it and asks them to help needy students in the future after they climb the socio-economic ladder. Later Bala meets Srinivas in private there Srinivas shows his pride for winning but Bala questions his way of winning and lefts.

Present: In the present, Kumar/Murthy continues his story, saying that the theater where they studied is now a coaching center for the underprivileged, developed by the old students, who take turns by teaching each year to crack IIT and NEET exams who now they are paying Gurudakshina through their works. While Kumar does not know the current whereabouts of Bala, it is shown that Bala and Meenakshi have opened a school, Ansari School of Knowledge, to provide free education for the underprivileged at Ooty who is paying his Guru Dakshina to his teacher Ansari who wishes his student Bala to teach for free to the underprivilaged students.

In the end, Abhiram and his friends achieved ranks within the Top 100 in the JEE Mains examination, with Abhiram securing the first rank, guided by Kumar, the old students, and Bala's recorded tapes. At their felicitation ceremony, despite being coerced by Srinivas, Abhi credits Bala for his achievement. In addition, he unveils Bala's tapes publicly, thus exposing Srinivas.

== Cast ==
- Dhanush as Balamurugan 'Bala' (Tamil Version)/Bala Gangadhar Thilak 'Balu' (Telugu Version)
- Samyuktha as Meenakshi
- Samuthirakani as Srinivas Tirupathi (Tamil Version)/Srinivas Tripathi (Telugu Version)
- Tanikella Bharani as Thanigachalam (Tamil Version)/Deekshitulu (Telugu Version)
- P. Sai Kumar as President Muthu Pandian (Tamil Version)/President Patthi Papa Rao (Telugu Version)
- Rajendran as Bhupathi (Tamil Version)/'Bhoothu' Bhushanam (Telugu Version)
- Narra Srinivas as Sudarshan
- Pammi Sai as Subbayya
- Aadukalam Naren as Narayana(n), Bala's father
- Hareesh Peradi as Ansari, Bala's teacher
- Ilavarasu as Education minister
- Thotapalli Madhu as Opposition Leader Narayana Swamy
- Hyper Aadi as Karthik
- Shah Ra as Prakash
- Ken Karunas as A. Mutthu Kumar "Muthu" (Tamil Version)/ Annavaram Satyanarayana Murthy "Satthi gadu"
  - Sumanth as grown up A. Muthu Kumar IAS (Tamil Version)/A. S. Murthy IAS(Telugu Version)(cameo appearance)
- Praveena as Bala's mother
- Naga Mahesh as Inspector Suresh
- Kalpa Latha as Meenakshi's mother
- Sathvik Varma as Abhiram
- Pavish Narayan as Abhiram's friend
- Bharathiraja as a villager (cameo)

== Production ==
=== Development ===
In late July 2021, it was reported that Dhanush would collaborate with Venky Atluri for the latter's next directional before his project with Sekhar Kammula; the film marks Dhanush foraying into Telugu cinema for the first time. Sithara Entertainments were reported to fund the project. The company made a public announcement on 22 December confirming the project, while the title Vaathi and Sir was announced the day after. Atluri had recruited music composer G. V. Prakash Kumar, cinematographer Dinesh Krishnan and editor Navin Nooli. Samyuktha was announced as the lead actress the same day.

=== Filming ===
Principal photography began on 5 January 2022. The second schedule of the shoot began in April 2022 when Dhanush had joined the sets after he had finished the shoot of Naane Varuvean. The filming was completed in October 2022.

== Music ==
The music of the film is composed by G. V. Prakash Kumar. He won the National Film Awards for Best Music Direction for Tamil. The first single titled "Vaa Vaathi" in Tamil and "Mastaaru Mastaaru" in Telugu was released on 10 November 2022. The second single titled "Naadodi Mannan" in Tamil and "Banjara" in Telugu was released on 17 January 2023.

== Release ==
=== Theatrical ===
The film was scheduled for a theatrical release on 2 December 2022 in Tamil and Telugu, but was postponed. In November 2022, it was announced that the film will release on 17 February 2023. It was announced that Seven Screen Studio has acquired the distribution rights of the film in Tamil Nadu.

=== Home media ===
Initially, there were reports suggesting that the film's streaming rights were acquired by Aha, but were later acquired by Netflix, while the satellite rights were acquired by Sun TV Network. It began streaming on Netflix from 17 March 2023 in Tamil, Telugu, and Hindi.

== Reception ==
Vaathi received mixed reviews from critics. On the review aggregator website Rotten Tomatoes, 67% of 6 critics' reviews are positive, with an average rating of 6/10.

Logesh Balachandran of The Times of India rated the film 3 out of 5 stars and wrote "Vaathi is a film that's mounted on no-nonsense writing though it could have been even better". Latha Srinivasan of India Today rated the film 2.5 out of 5 and said that the film has a "noble mission" but Venky Atluri's story and narration are a big let-down. Avinash Ramachandran of The New Indian Express rated the film 2.5 out of 5 stars and wrote "Despite using a 140-minute runtime to teach us a bunch of subjects, but the film teaches us are "Films don't have to be preachy to drive home a point" and "Dhanush can make anything look easy". Anandu Suresh of The Indian Express rated the film 1.5 out of 5 stars and termed the film as Dhanush starrer about right to education fares poorly. Bharathy Singaravel of The News Minute rated the film 1 out of 5 stars and wrote "A film of such mediocrity and confused politics".

=== Accolades ===
Award	Category	Nominee(s)	Result	Ref
Filmfare Awards South	Best Actor – Telugu	Dhanush	Nominated	
Filmfare Awards South	Best Female Playback Singer – Telugu	Shweta Mohan – "Mastaaru Mastaaru"	Won	
South Indian International Movie Awards	Best Actor – Telugu	Dhanush	Nominated	
South Indian International Movie Awards	Best Female Playback Singer – Telugu	Shweta Mohan – "Mastaaru Mastaaru"	Nominated	
South Indian International Movie Awards	Best Female Playback Singer – Tamil	Shweta Mohan – "Vaa Vaathi"	Nominated	
National Film Awards	Best Music Director (Songs)	G.V. Prakash Kumar	Won	
