= Attarintiki Daredi =

2013 film by Trivikram Srinivas

- Theatrical release poster
- Directed by: Trivikram Srinivas
- Written by: Trivikram Srinivas
- Produced by: B. V. S. N. Prasad
- Starring: Pawan Kalyan; Samantha; Pranitha Subhash
- Cinematography: Prasad Murella
- Edited by: Prawin Pudi
- Music by: Devi Sri Prasad
- Production company: Sri Venkateswara Cine Chitra
- Distributed by: Reliance Entertainment
- Release date: 27 September 2013
- Running time: 175 minutes
- Country: India
- Language: Telugu
- Budget: ₹55 crore
- Box office: ₹131 crore

Attarintiki Daredi (transl. Which way is aunt's home?) is a 2013 Indian Telugu-language action comedy drama film written and directed by Trivikram Srinivas. Produced by Sri Venkateswara Cine Chitra and Reliance Entertainment, the film stars Pawan Kalyan, Samantha and Pranitha Subhash. Nadhiya, Boman Irani and Brahmanandam feature in supporting roles. The film score and soundtrack album were composed by Devi Sri Prasad. Prasad Murella was the cinematographer.

The film focuses on Gautham Nanda, a business heir who acts as a driver in his estranged aunt Sunanda's house to mend her strained relationship with his grandfather Raghunandan who expelled her for marrying against his wishes years before. Principal photography began in January 2013 and ended in July 2013, with the film being primarily shot in and around Hyderabad. Significant portions were shot in Pollachi and Europe.

Prior to the film's release, on 22 September 2013, 90-minute footage of the film was leaked online and was widely shared leading to a delay in its release. The film was released on 27 September 2013 and received positive reviews. Despite the leak of half of the film prior to its release, Attarintiki Daredi emerged as a major box office success, and went on to become the highest grossing film in the Telugu language, surpassing Magadheera (2009), with earnings of over ₹131 crore, whilst also collecting a distributor's share of ₹74.88 crore. It was the second highest-grossing film produced from Tollywood in terms of overall box office, due to Magadheera being one of the few Telugu films prior to Baahubali: The Beginning (2015) to receive a widespread dubbed release. It was later surpassed by the after mentioned Baahubali: The Beginning. The film won five Nandi Awards, four Filmfare Awards South, and the B. Nagi Reddy Memorial Award. It was remade in Kannada as Ranna (2015), in Bengali as Abhiman (2016) and in Tamil as Vantha Rajavathaan Varuven (2019).

== Plot ==
In Milan, business tycoon Raghunandan reveals to his grandson, Gautham Nanda, his wish to mend relations with his estranged daughter Sunanda, whom he disowned for marrying Rajashekar against his wishes. Determined to reconcile the family before Raghunandan's 80th birthday, Gautham travels to Hyderabad, India. Disguised as a driver named Siddhartha, he earns the trust of Rajashekar, who has suffered a heart attack, and his family by admitting Rajashekar to the hospital.

Gautham, posing as Siddhartha, is hired as a driver by Sunanda and befriends her eldest daughter, Prameela, while Sunanda's second daughter, Sasi, grows suspicious of him and his friend Paddu, Rajashekar's nurse. Sunanda discloses to Gautham that she is aware of who he is and warns him from doing anything with an intent to take her back to Raghunandan whom she refuses to forgive as the latter shot Rajashekar in his arm in a fit of rage when they got married after eloping. Gautham saves Prameela from a suicide attempt and she divulges that she was trying to run away with Rohith, whom Gautham assumed to be the kidnapper. Prameela requests Gautham to bring Rohith to her as he is being forced to marry Neelamani, daughter of a fierce factionist Siddhappa Naidu, the very next day and Gautham obliges to her plea.

Gautham and Paddu travel to Siddhappa's village to retrieve Rohith, but Sasi inadvertently falls into their jeep and suffers from amnesia. To protect her, Gautham pretends to be her lover, whom she ran away with against her mother's wishes. Gautham and Paddu successfully rescue Rohith, but are pursued by Siddhappa and his men. During a confrontation, Sasi regains her memory. Siddhappa then confronts Rajashekar and Sunanda, demanding compensation for the damage caused to her daughter and their reputation. To prevent further conflict, Sunanda offers to get Sasi married to Siddhappa's elder son and Rajashekar dismisses Gautham from his job. Sasi confesses her love for Gautham, which is overheard by her cousin.

Baddham Bhaskar, an affluent NRI and Siddhappa's nephew, arrives as a guest at Sunanda's home. Sunanda reveals to her assistant Murthy that Bhaskar was her previous assistant, who had become wealthy by discovering diamonds in a plot he bought in Uganda with the ₹2 lakh he stole from her. Gautham traps Bhaskar, who has a penchant for women and desires to marry Sasi and joins him as his assistant, entering Sunanda's residence with his support.

Bhaskar's conspiracies to get close to Sasi are constantly thwarted by Gautham who takes Sasi to the railway station for eloping to Chennai apparently. Siddhappa's men arrive at the station after learning from Sasi's cousin about her love for Gautham but the latter thrashes them and Sasi perceives Gautham's true identity and his intentions. Rajashekar arrives at the station and attempts to shoot Gautham. Gautham wonders that if Raghunandan was wrong at that time for shooting Rajashekar then why is the latter doing the same right now. Gautham reflects on Raghunandan's past actions and reveals that after Sunanda eloped with Rajashekar, Raghunandan, overwhelmed with guilt, accidentally killed Gautham's mother Pooja while trying to shoot himself. Despite this tragedy, Gautham and his father had forgiven Raghunandan.

Realizing their errors, Rajashekar and Sunanda reconcile with Gautham and agree to mend their relationship with Raghunandan. Bhaskar, seeking revenge, kidnaps Sasi, but Gautham and Paddu rescue her. Bhaskar discovers that the Ugandan government has seized his wealth, leaving him with only ₹2 lakh. Sunanda travels to Milan with her family, publicly supporting Raghunandan during a board meeting and endorsing Gautham as the new CEO of the company.

The film concludes with Bhaskar resuming his position as Sunanda's assistant, and Raghunandan expressing his affection for Gautham, solidifying the family's reconciliation and unity as the entire family eat together happily..

== Cast ==
- Pawan Kalyan as Gautham Nanda / Siddartha "Siddhu"
- Samantha as Sasirekha “Sasi”, Gautham's wife (Voice dubbed by Chinmayi)
- Pranitha Subhash as Prameela, Sasi's sister
- Nadhiya as Sunanda, Raghunandan's daughter, Rajashekhar's wife
- Boman Irani as Raghunandan
- Brahmanandam as Baddam Bhaskar (Siddhappa Naidu's Nephew)
- Rao Ramesh as Rajashekhar, Sunanda’s husband and father of Sasi and Prameela
- Kota Srinivasa Rao as Siddhappa Naidu
- Ali as Paddu
- M. S. Narayana as Balu
- Mukesh Rishi as Hari, Gautham's father
- Pragathi as Pooja, Gautham's mother
- Posani Krishna Murali as Raja Ratnam
- Navika Kotia as Sasi and Pramila's cousin
- Raghu Babu as Murthy
- Dhanraj as Sasi's kidnapper
- Venu as Sasi's kidnapper
- Srinivasa Reddy as Baddam Bhaskar's assistant
- Ahuti Prasad as Rohith's father
- Brahmaji as Rajashekhar's brother
- Pruthviraj as Paata Basti Parameswar
- Sameer Hasan as ACP
- Hema as Rajashekhar's sister-in-law
- Vamsi Krishna as Praveen Nalla
- Bharath Reddy as Rohith
- Pradeep Machiraju as Shekhar's nephew
- Delhi Rajeswari as Shekhar's sister-in-law
- Sivannarayana Naripeddi as Rajashekhar's brother
- Rajitha as Rajashekhar's elder sister
- Narra Srinu as Siddhu's assistant
- Ravi Prakash as Siddhappa Naidu's son
- Amit Tiwari as Siddhappa Naidu's son
- Hari Teja as Neelamani
- Fish Venkat as Siddhappa Naidu's henchman
- Chitram Srinu as Siddhappa Naidu's henchman
- Prabhakar as Siddhappa Naidu's henchman
- Shatru as Prameela's kidnapper
- Satyadev as Prameela's kidnapper
- Madhavi
- Devi Sri Prasad (special appearance) in "Ninnu Chudagane" song
- Hamsa Nandini (special appearance) in "It's Time To Party" song
- Mumtaj (special appearance) in "It's Time To Party" song

== Production ==
=== Development ===
Trivikram Srinivas planned to direct Pawan Kalyan in a film produced by D. V. V. Danayya and narrated the script in late January 2011. However, Srinivas later began Julayi (2012) while Kalyan was working on Gabbar Singh (2012) and Cameraman Gangatho Rambabu (2012). The technical crew of Kalyan's and Srinivas's previous collaboration, Jalsa (2008), were selected to work on the film. B. V. S. N. Prasad was expected to produce Attarintiki Daredi while Kalyan was expected to allot dates in his schedule from October 2012. Srinivas gave finishing touches to the script in late September 2012 and Reliance Entertainment was confirmed to co-produce. Devi Sri Prasad was selected as the music director and the music sittings were held at Barcelona during the location scout in December 2012.

Attarintiki Daredi was launched on 23 November 2012 at Venkateswara temple in Film Nagar. He hinted that the script will depict the Telugu culture and traditions with a strong message. Prasad Murella handled the cinematography and few sequences were shot using a Milo robotic camera which B. V. S. N. Prasad brought in from Mumbai as it was unavailable in Hyderabad. In mid July 2013, the title was confirmed to be Attarintiki Daredi.

=== Casting ===
Kalyan opted for a complete makeover and sported a look resembling the one he sported in his previous films Kushi (2001) and Jalsa. After Srinivas narrated the script to Kalyan, he asked him who would play the role of his aunt and Srinivas replied it would be Nadhiya. Kalyan gave his approval for Srinivas's selection and Nadhiya was selected before she signed her comeback film in Telugu, Mirchi (2013). Srinivas narrated the script in a conversation with her over the telephone. After she accepted, he said that he would ask her dates after their schedules were planned. She later revealed that she was scared of being typecast but did the role only on Srinivas' insistence and added that the character's emotions were set quite well.

Srinivas decided to cast Ileana D'Cruz as the female lead who worked with him on Jalsa and Julayi. Samantha was confirmed as the female lead in late October 2012 which marked her first collaboration with Kalyan. The second female lead was yet to be selected. By the end of December 2012, most of the films which were in the pre-production phase were confirming their female leads. Because of this the production unit decided to begin the shoot without confirming the other heroine.

Pranitha Subhash was selected as the second female lead in early January 2013 and was confirmed to play Samantha's sister. Pranitha called it a lifetime opportunity and said that she would be seen in a "very sweet, girl-next-door character." Boman Irani made his debut in Telugu with Attarintiki Daredi; he played Raghunandan, the grandfather of Kalyan's character. Kota Srinivasa Rao played the role of Sidhappa Naidu for which he sported a realistic and rugged look. Navika Kotia was selected for the role of the younger sister of Samantha and Pranitha in April 2013.

Srinivas did not cast his regular associate Sunil in the film. Since Sunil's success of Maryada Ramanna (2010) and Poola Rangadu (2012) as a lead actor, Srinivas felt that it would not be fair to make him play a comedian. Rao Ramesh, Mukesh Rishi, Brahmanandam, Ali, M. S. Narayana and Posani Krishna Murali were cast in supporting roles.

Mumtaj and Hamsa Nandini were confirmed to make special appearances in the song "It's Time To Party" marking the former's comeback in Telugu cinema after 12 years after anchor Anasuya refused the offer.

=== Filming ===
"While shooting scenes with Nadhiya, I used to laugh out loud due to her dialogue delivery. Since she wasn't perfect in Telugu, I used to laugh whenever she tried to mouth dialogue. Nadhiya complained to Pawan that she can't do the scene if Trivikram is there on sets. Then Pawan took over the charge and sent me out and he directed the whole scene. I came after a while and saw the output and said okay."

— Trivikram Srinivas, on one of the incidents during the film's shoot.

B. V. S. N. Prasad stated during the film's launch that principal photography would begin in mid-December 2012. Kalyan searched for new locations in Spain as the story demanded a foreign location and around 30 to 45 days of shooting schedule was planned there. It was the first time Kalyan went for a location hunt and returned in the last week of December 2012. Due to unknown reasons, the film's shoot was postponed to 8 January 2013 in late December 2012.

Shooting finally commenced from 24 January 2013 at a private hotel in Hyderabad. The team planned a new schedule from 4 February 2013 in Pollachi where scenes on Kalyan, Samantha and other support cast were planned to be shot. The schedule was postponed to 15 February 2013 and Srinivas continued the shoot in Hyderabad. After shooting for a few days in Hyderabad at a private mall, the planned schedule at Pollachi began from 12 February 2013.

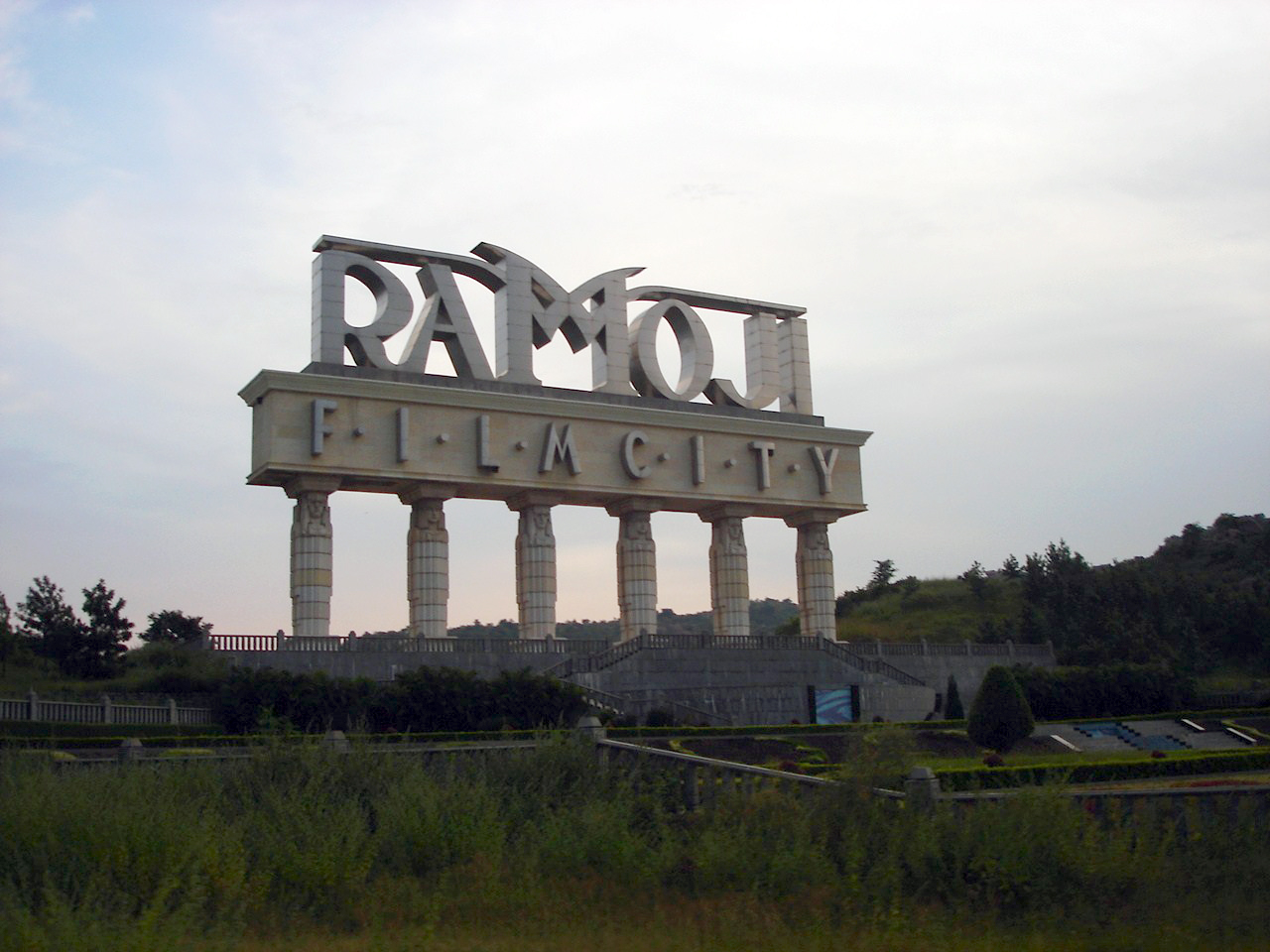
Ramoji Film City, where Attarintiki Daredi was significantly shot.

An action sequence featuring Kalyan and other cast members was shot in late February 2013. The next schedule commenced from 1 March 2013 at a specially erected set at Ramoji Film City in Hyderabad where scenes featuring Kalyan and the other cast members were shot. A few crucial scenes featuring the lead actors were shot there in early April 2013. Art director Ravindar supervised for the special set, which was worth ₹3 crore. By mid-April 2013, a major portion of the film was shot there. Kalyan and the film's unit planned to leave for Spain to shoot important sequences.

Scenes featuring the lead cast were shot in the end of April 2013 in a railway station set erected at Ramoji Film City. A new schedule began at Ramoji Film City from 2 May 2013.

Filming then moved to Europe on 5 June 2013 for a long schedule in which three songs, a few speaking portions and an action sequence were planned to be shot. Kalyan's introduction scene was shot in Switzerland which cost around ₹2 crore. The introduction scene, which was also an action sequence, was shot on an island located in Spain using helicopters under the supervision of Peter Hein. Post-production activities were done simultaneously and dubbing for the film's first half was completed. The team returned from Milan on 2 July 2013.

The song "Its Time to Party", which primarily features Kalyan, Samantha, Pranitha, Mumtaj and Hamsa Nandini was choreographed by Ganesh and was shot in a pub set erected by Anand Sai at Annapurna 7 Acres Studios. Principal photography wrapped on 14 July 2013.

== Themes and influences ==
Attarintiki Daredi focuses on a young man's journey trying to convince his estranged paternal aunt to reconcile with the family. In its review, Sify felt that the film's story was a reversal of Nuvvu Naaku Nachav (2001) and Parugu (2008). Kalyan's character, Gautham, is shown watching a few films, (Note: The films that Pawan Kalyan watches, in the order in which they are screened before him by M. S. Narayana, are Taxi Ramudu (1961), Donga Ramudu (1955) and Gang Leader (1991).) where the protagonist is in disguise trying to win over people who matter to him. In the film, Brahmanandam's character spoofs the Ridley Scott film, Gladiator (2000) named Radiator and wins the Bascar awards founded by himself after being inspired from the Academy Awards.

The mythological tale of Indra seducing Ahalya after disguising as her husband Gautama and the curse cast by Gautama on them is parodied in the film with Brahmanandam playing a key role. Two songs were parodied: one of them being a devotional song "Kaatama Rayuda" written by the poet Etla Ramadasa and composed by V. Nagayya for the film Sumangali (1940) and the other an item number "Kevvu Keka" written by Sahithi and composed by Devi Sri Prasad for the film Gabbar Singh (2012). A scene from the film, popularly known as the "badam tree" episode, was based on a similar scene from the 2012 English film A Thousand Words.

== Music ==
Devi Sri Prasad composed the soundtrack album which consists of six songs. Sri Mani, Ramajogayya Sastry and Prasad himself wrote the lyrics for the soundtrack album, which was marketed by Aditya Music. The album was released on 19 July 2013 in a promotional event at the Shilpakala Vedika with the film's cast and crew attending the event. The soundtrack album received positive reviews from critics.

== Release ==
In late April 2013, Attarintiki Daredi was expected to release on 7 August 2013.

=== Distribution ===
The theatrical rights in the Nizam region were acquired by Global Cinemas in late April 2013 for a then undisclosed record price, which was revealed later as ₹12 crore in early June 2013. My3 (Note: Pronounced as Mythri.) Movies announced on 26 April 2013 that they acquired the overseas distribution and DVD rights of the film. Y. Naveen, who financed several overseas distribution firms, acquired this film's overseas rights on behalf of My3 Movies for ₹7 crore which, according to Sify, was "a big gamble". Colours Media acquired the distribution rights in the United Kingdom from My3 Movies in late July 2013. Lorgan Entertainments acquired the theatrical distribution rights in Australia in early August 2013.

=== Marketing ===
The first look poster featuring Kalyan in a red shirt and dark cargo pants was unveiled on 13 July 2013.

The theatrical trailer was released on 19 July 2013 to positive reviews. IANS wrote in its trailer review, "High on commercial value, the slick trailer of Attarintiki Daaredhi is a mix of action, comedy, romance and drama in appropriate proportions. Trivikram hasn't compromised on anything, including special punch lines for Pawan Kalyan, which he mouths in his signature style with a hint of sarcasm."

The video featuring Kalyan recording the song "Kaatama Rayuda" was released on 4 August 2013. The video received positive response and according to a report by The Times of India, Kalyan's fans were of the opinion that the song composed by Devi Sri Prasad reminded them of the song sung by Kalyan in the film Thammudu (1999). In late October 2013, the makers planned to add two more scenes as a promotional stunt to discourage copyright infringement. Six minutes of footage were added to the film this version was screened from 31 October 2013.

=== Piracy ===
On the night of 22 September 2013, a 90-minute piece of footage was leaked online and was widely shared. B. V. S. N. Prasad filed a complaint the following day against the copyright violation, and sought cyber-protection for Attarintiki Daredi. Because of this incident, the film's release was delayed to 27 September 2013. The film's female lead, Samantha, as well as other celebrities such as Siddharth, Harish Shankar, S. S. Rajamouli, Ram Gopal Varma and Nithiin, condemned the unauthorised distribution act. However, police initially suspected that the incident might be a publicity stunt enacted by people who invested in the film.

On being informed about the alleged sale of the movie in different electronic formats in the CD and mobile shops in Pedana town, Superintendent of Police J. Prabhakara Rao deployed a special team, led by Pedana Rural Circle Inspector A. Pallapu Raju, to investigate the issue. The police launched a hunt for unlicensed compact discs in the CD shops across the district. CDs and hard disks from video parlours and shops renting CDs in the Krishna district were seized, and some of the shop owners were taken into custody for questioning. Kalyan's fans went out into the streets, with signs containing slogans protesting the piracy. Subsequent to their investigation, the police arrested five people, in addition to production assistant Cheekati Arunkumar, and recovered several illegitimate copies of the film on 20 September 2013. Arunkumar had worked as a production assistant for the films Oosaravelli (2011) and Ongole Gittha (2013), both of which were produced by B. V. S. N. Prasad.

Prabhakara Rao told the media that Arunkumar had given a copy of the DVD to his friend and Hyderabad-based APSP constable, Katta Ravi, who sent it to his friend, V. Sudheer Kumar, on 14 September 2013. Pedana-based videographer Poranki Suresh got the DVD from Sudheer Kumar, and later gave it to Kollipalli Anil Kumar, who owns the Devi Mobiles and Cell repair shop in Pedana. Anil Kumar had uploaded the two-part movie into his system, and sold the 60-minute part-one of the movie to his customers in different formats. Anil Kumar deleted the original file in his system after learning about the police raids. However, he confessed to the crime during the investigation. Based on the information given by Anil Kumar, a special team led by Machilipatnam DSP K.V. Srinivasa Rao, with the support of the Crime Investigation Department, Hyderabad, arrested the suspects in Hyderabad. The police filed charges on 24 September 2013, against the five suspects under clauses 63, 65 and 66 of the Copyright (Amendment Bill) 2010 and 429 IPC.

Kalyan and Srinivas decided to return a significant portion of their remuneration to help Prasad overcome the financial crisis caused by the leak. Samantha returned her entire salary to the producers. Kalyan remained silent during the entire issue, but finally spoke at length about the episode at the "Thank You Meet" of the film on 14 October 2013. He said that this was a conspiracy and not piracy. He added that he was very well aware of the facts as to who was behind the leak of the film and will not spare anyone and will strike when the time is right.

=== Home media ===
The television broadcast rights were sold to an unknown channel in mid June 2013 for an amount of ₹9 crore which happened to be the highest amount that a television channel paid for the telecast rights of a Telugu film till the sale of rights of Aagadu (2014) to Gemini TV in June 2014. The Indian DVD and Blu-ray were marketed by Volga Videos. The overseas DVD and Blu-ray were marketed by Bhavani Videos.

== Reception ==
=== Critical reception ===
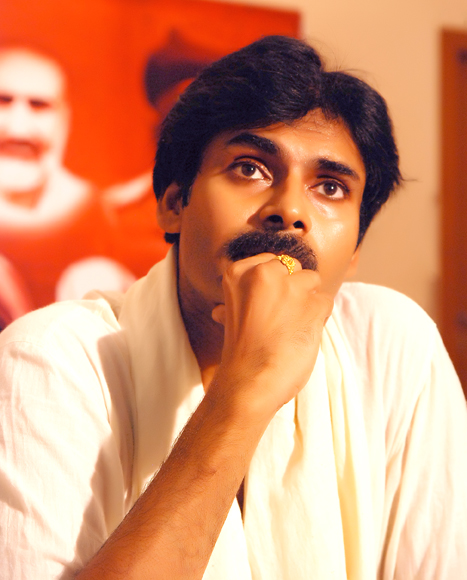
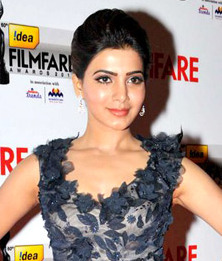
Kalyan (top) attracted positive reviews for his performance while Samantha (bottom) received praise for her performance in a limited role.

Sangeetha Devi Dundoo of The Hindu praised the film's climax scene, while also stating that Trivikram Srinivas makes his presence felt before concluding that the film is, "A good dose of fun, tailored for the box office." Ch. Sushil Rao of The Times of India rated the film four out of five stars and wrote "The movie is a worth watch. The reasons: Pawan Kalyan's comedy, fights composed by Peter Hein, Trivikram Srinivas' writing skills, Prasad Murella's cinematography, and Devi Sri Prasad's music. That there is promise in the movie is a feeling one gets right from the opening scenes which are dramatic". Sify rated the film four out of five and stated "If you are looking for sheer entertainment, know that Pawan Kalyan and Trivikram have gift packed for you with high dose of comedy. It is entertainment, entertainment and entertainment. Pawan Kalyan`s histrionics, his performances and Trivikram`s handling of the simple story in an effective way is what makes Attharintiki Daaredhi a big entertainer".

Jeevi of Idlebrain.com rated the film four out of five and praised Srinivas' script and added that Kalyan's performance and Srinivas' story telling skill "makes sure that your heart is touched at times and heartily laugh all the time while watching the movie".

In contrast, Sridhar Vivan of Bangalore Mirror rated the film two-and-a-half out of five and criticised the film's first half and felt that the "real entertainment" began only after the entry of Brahmanandam's character. He too praised Kalyan's performance and the film's climax and Srinivas' direction. Radhika Rajamani of Rediff.com rated the film two-and-a-half out of five; she praised the performances of the cast but called Attarintiki Daredi, "a stylish film which does not rise above being a routine family entertainer." IANS rated the film two-and-a-half out of five and wrote "Unfortunately, Trivikram succumbs to star pressure and churns out a highly disappointing product. At nearly three hours, the film makes you cringe in your seats, especially with the emotional punch it delivers in the climax". Sandeep Atreysa of Deccan Chronicle rated the film one-and-a-half out of five and felt that the film was made only for Kalyan's passionate fans and for others, this film would appear to be "high on style and low on content". He called Kalyan's performance as the only "silver lining".

== Box office ==
The film collected a share of ₹33.56 crore (equivalent to ₹62 crore or US$6.5 million in 2026) by the end of its three-day first weekend.

=== India ===
Attarinitki Daredi collected ₹10.89 crore (equivalent to ₹20 crore or US$2.1 million in 2026) on its first day at the Andhra Pradesh and Nizam (Note: For film trade purpose, the Nizam region includes the three districts of Kalaburagi, Bidar, and Raichur in Karnataka and seven districts in the Marathwada region including Aurangabad, Latur, Nanded, Parbhani, Beed, Jalna and Osmanabad apart from the state of Telangana.) regions breaking the previous opening day record set by Baadshah. The film collected ₹22.71 crore (equivalent to ₹42 crore or US$4.4 million in 2026) at the Andhra Pradesh and Nizam regions, ₹3 crore (equivalent to ₹5.6 crore or US$580,000 in 2026) together in Tamil Nadu and Karnataka and ₹1.66 crore (equivalent to ₹3.1 crore or US$320,000 in 2026) in the rest of India by the end of its three-day first weekend taking its worldwide total to ₹33.52 crore (equivalent to ₹62 crore or US$6.5 million in 2026).

By the end of its first week, the film collected ₹35.05 crore (equivalent to ₹65 crore or US$6.8 million in 2026) at the Andhra Pradesh and Nizam regions and ₹5 crore (equivalent to ₹9.3 crore or US$960,000 in 2026) from other states. The film grossed ₹1.08 crore (equivalent to ₹2.0 crore or US$210,000 in 2026) in its first weekend and ₹1.45 crore (equivalent to ₹2.7 crore or US$280,000 in 2026) in its first week with a net collection of ₹1.05 crore (equivalent to ₹1.9 crore or US$200,000 in 2026) and distributor share of approximately ₹0.5 crore (equivalent to ₹9.3 million or US$96,000 in 2026) at Tamil Nadu Box office thus creating a then all-time record for a Telugu film in the state according to trade analyst Sreedhar Pillai who felt that the film's collections had dropped due to the release of Raja Rani and Idharkuthane Aasaipattai Balakumara in the same week. The film earned ₹2.5 crore (equivalent to ₹4.6 crore or US$480,000 in 2026) in its first weekend and ₹4.11 crore (equivalent to ₹7.6 crore or US$790,000 in 2026) nett in its first week at Karnataka and also created an all-time record for a Telugu film. Adarsh reported that the Attarintiki Daredi earned ₹1.58 crore (equivalent to ₹2.9 crore or US$300,000 in 2026) in Mumbai and Kerala.

The film collected ₹58 crore (equivalent to ₹108 crore or US$11 million in 2026) at the Andhra Pradesh and Nizam regions in six weeks. The film completed a 50-day run in around 170 theatres on 15 November 2013. On the 100th day of its theatrical run, Attarintiki Daredi was screened in four centres in Nizam, eleven in Ceded, one in Vishakhapatnam, four each in Krishna and Guntur, six and two centres in East and West Godavari respectively.

=== Overseas ===
According to Adarsh, the film collected ₹2.67 crore (equivalent to ₹5.0 crore or US$510,000 in 2026) from paid previews in the United States box office. The film collected ₹6.15 crore (equivalent to ₹11 crore or US$1.2 million in 2026) in the first three days at United States box office. According to Adarsh, the film was the third biggest opener in the United States in 2013 after Chennai Express and Yeh Jawaani Hai Deewani and was the only Indian film apart from the other two to feature in the list of top 15 openers of 2013 in the country.

== Awards and nominations ==
Ceremony	Category	Nominee	Result	Ref.
B. Nagi Reddy Memorial Award	Best Telugu Family Entertainer	B. V. S. N. Prasad	Won	
Nandi Awards of 2013	Best Popular Feature Film	B. V. S. N. Prasad	Won	
Nandi Awards of 2013	Best Supporting Actress	Nadhiya	Won	
Nandi Awards of 2013	Best Dialogue Writer	Trivikram Srinivas	Won	
Nandi Awards of 2013	Best Music Director	Devi Sri Prasad	Won	
Nandi Awards of 2013	Best Male Dubbing Artist	P. Ravi Shankar	Won	
61st Filmfare Awards South	Filmfare Award for Best Film – Telugu	B. V. S. N. Prasad	Won	
61st Filmfare Awards South	Filmfare Award for Best Director – Telugu	Trivikram Srinivas	Won	
61st Filmfare Awards South	Filmfare Award for Best Actor – Telugu	Pawan Kalyan	Nominated	
61st Filmfare Awards South	Filmfare Award for Best Actress – Telugu	Samantha	Nominated	
61st Filmfare Awards South	Filmfare Award for Best Music Director – Telugu	Devi Sri Prasad	Won	
61st Filmfare Awards South	Filmfare Award for Best Supporting Actress – Telugu	Nadhiya	Nominated	
61st Filmfare Awards South	Filmfare Award for Best Supporting Actress – Telugu	Pranitha Subhash	Nominated	
61st Filmfare Awards South	Filmfare Award for Best Lyricist – Telugu	Sri Mani for "Aaradugula Bullet"	Won	
61st Filmfare Awards South	Filmfare Award for Best Male Playback Singer – Telugu	Shankar Mahadevan for "Bapu Gari Bommo"	Nominated	
3rd South Indian International Movie Awards	SIIMA Award for Best Film (Telugu)	B. V. S. N. Prasad	Won	
3rd South Indian International Movie Awards	SIIMA Award for Best Director (Telugu)	Trivikram Srinivas	Won	
3rd South Indian International Movie Awards	SIIMA Award for Best Actor (Telugu)	Pawan Kalyan	Nominated	
3rd South Indian International Movie Awards	SIIMA Award for Best Actress (Telugu)	Samantha	Won	
3rd South Indian International Movie Awards	SIIMA Award for Best Cinematographer (Telugu)	Prasad Murella	Won	
3rd South Indian International Movie Awards	SIIMA Award for Best Music Director (Telugu)	Devi Sri Prasad	Won	
3rd South Indian International Movie Awards	SIIMA Award for Best Male Playback Singer (Telugu)	Shankar Mahadevan for "Bapu Gari Bommo"	Nominated	
3rd South Indian International Movie Awards	SIIMA Award for Best Lyricist (Telugu)	Sri Mani for "Aaradugula Bullet"	Nominated	
3rd South Indian International Movie Awards	SIIMA Award for Best Supporting Actor (Telugu)	Boman Irani	Nominated	
3rd South Indian International Movie Awards	SIIMA Award for Best Supporting Actress (Telugu)	Nadhiya	Nominated	
3rd South Indian International Movie Awards	Best Fight Choreographer	Peter Hein	Won	
3rd South Indian International Movie Awards	Best Dance Choreographer	Ganesh for "Its Time to Party"	Nominated	

== Remakes ==
The film was remade into Kannada as Ranna in 2015 directed by Nanda Kishore and Sundar C directed the Tamil remake Vantha Rajavathaan Varuven which was released in 2019, and Raj Chakraborty directed the Bengali remake Abhiman (2016).
