= Manjari =

Manjari may refer to:

== People ==
- Manjari (Indian singer) (born 1986), Indian playback singer and Hindustani vocalist
- Manjari (Norwegian singer), participant in The Eurovision Song Contest in 1997
- Manjari Bhargava (f. 1974), Indian diver
- Manjari Chaturvedi, Indian Sufi Kathak dancer
- Manjari Fadnis (born 1993), Indian actress
- Manjari Joshi (born 1960), Indian TV newsreader/anchor
- Manjari Makijany (born 1986/87), Indian writer, director and producer
- Rupa Manjari (born 1990), Indian film actress
- Shashank Manjari (1899-1987), Indian politician
- Ratna Manjari Devi (1935–2019), Indian politician

== Other uses ==
- Manjari, Belgaum, village in Karnataka, India
- Manjari (film), Nepalese film featuring Sujata Koirala
- Manjari Budruk railway station, in Pune, India
