= Devudu Chesina Manushulu (2012 film) =

2012 Indian film by Puri Jagannadh

- Theatrical release poster
- Directed by: Puri Jagannadh
- Written by: Puri Jagannadh
- Produced by: B. V. S. N. Prasad
- Starring: Ravi Teja; Ileana; Prakash Raj
- Cinematography: Shyam K. Naidu
- Edited by: M. S. Rajashekhar Reddy (S. R. Shekhar)
- Music by: Raghu Kunche
- Production companies: Sri Venkateswara Cine Chitra; Reliance Entertainment
- Distributed by: Reliance Entertainment; Hari Venkateswara Pictures (Overseas)
- Release date: 14 August 2012
- Running time: 124 minutes
- Country: India
- Language: Telugu

Devudu Chesina Manushulu (transl. God-made humans) is a 2012 Indian Telugu-language fantasy action comedy film written and directed by Puri Jagannadh. The film produced by B. V. S. N. Prasad's Sri Venkateswara Cine Chitra in association with Reliance Entertainment. The film stars Ravi Teja, Ileana and Prakash Raj. The soundtrack of the film was composed by Raghu Kunche while the cinematography was handled by Shyam K. Naidu.

The film began its production in January 2012 and was released on 14 August 2012, The film received predominantly negative reviews from critics and failed at the box office.

== Plot ==
Vishnu tries to pacify Lakshmi, who is quite disappointed after listening to words of Narada that Vishnu didn't give any present to Lakshmi on the eve of her birthday, that falls on Akshaya Tritiya. Vishnu shows a love story between two orphans Ravi Teja, a settlement broker in Hyderabad and Ileana, a taxi driver living in Bangkok.

Panileni Papayya sits at a shop, eats a banana and throws the peel on the road. Using the peel, Lakshmi Devi creates a small problem which leads C.I. Subbaraju killing Sandy, a trusted goon of the absent-minded Don Prakash Raj of Bangkok. Thus to settle the problem between the two, Ravi Teja goes to Bangkok. At the airport, a taxi driver Goli, steals the bag of Ravi Teja, which has his belongings, including his passport. He chases him in Ileana's car, but his efforts are in vain. Feeling bad upon learning he is an orphan like her, Ileana invites Ravi Teja to her home. The next day he finds Goli, who is a die-hard devotee of Lakshmi Devi and meets Prakash Raj through him and settles the problem. Prakash Raj, who lusts after Ileana, asks Ravi Teja to send Ileana for a night for having sex. He bashes his entire team and runs to Ileana, who is already in love with him. Both quarrel and get separated. Unhappy with the turn of events, Lakshmi Devi goes into the past and makes Papayya throw the Banana peel into a dust bin instead of on the road.

Due to this, the story turns like this: Sandy is caught red-handed by Subbaraju and Sandy is sent to jail. As Sandy is a trusted goon and has all the information regarding his activities, Prakash Raj is furious and wants Sandy released. Ravi Teja is appointed by Prakash Raj's henchmen to strike a deal between Subbaraju and Prakash Raj. Both Ravi Teja and Subbaraju go to Bangkok.

At the airport, he sees Ileana for the first time and falls in love with her, due to which he refuses to sit in the taxi of Goli and sits in her taxi. Meanwhile, Prakash Raj's men chase them in Goli's Taxi. During the chase, Subbaraju, Ravi Teja and Ileana are safe, but their taxi is destroyed. After a long argument, Ravi Teja promises to buy a taxi when the deal is over and stay at Ileana's house as Subbaraju is injured. Meanwhile, Ravi Teja flirts with Ileana, which infuriates her. Both go to Prakash Raj and settle the problem for ₹2 crore. Prakash Raj sees his sister in Ileana and is ready to do anything for her. Ileana accepts him as her brother. Meanwhile, Ravi Teja proposes to Ileana, to which she accepts happily.

At the time of closing of the deal, Prakash Raj brings the ₹2 crore, but Subbaraju comes with the police forces. Meanwhile, Ravi Teja and Ileana quarrel but both hug each other, expressing their love. Finally, after a fight sequence, Ravi Teja and Ileana are shown to live a happy life and Prakash Raj is a member of their family who would return to their home after six months of imprisonment. The whole story is seen by Lakshmi Devi, and Lord Vishnu is successful in making her happy.

== Cast ==
- Ravi Teja as Ravi Teja
- Ileana as Ileana
- Prakash Raj as Prakash Raj
- Brahmanandam as Vishnu / Brahmanandam
- Ali as Goli
- M. S. Narayana as Panileni Papayya
- Kovai Sarala as Lakshmi
- Jyothi Rana as Jyothi / Prakash Raj's Lover
- Fish Venkat as Fish Venkat
- Subbaraju as CI Subbaraju
- Manasa Himavarsha as Manasa / Subbaraju's Lover
- Gabriela Bertante in an Item number in the song "Disturb Chettanade"

== Production ==
This film was the fifth time actor Ravi Teja and director Puri Jagannadh are seen working for a film. They previously worked for Itlu Sravani Subramanyam, Idiot, Amma Nanna O Tamila Ammayi and Neninthe. This film saw Puri Jagannadh working for the third time with Ileana D'Cruz after Pokiri and Nenu Naa Rakshasi. This was the third time for Ravi Teja to work with Ileana after Khatarnak and Kick. This film also saw Ravi Teja's third film with producer BVSN Prasad after Ee Abbai Chala Manchodu and Khatarnak. The film was initially planned to be the sequel of 2002 hit film Idiot. The idea was later dropped by Puri Jgannadh as he felt that the idea wasn't interesting. Puri Jagannadh, who is well known for naming his films with powerful titles, has changed his way and named this film after the 1973 hit film Devudu Chesina Manushulu, starring N. T. Rama Rao and Krishna. The film was officially announced on 27 January 2012 and was launched on 17 February 2012. The first look of the film was released by Puri Jagannadh through Twitter.

=== Filming ===
Filming began on 2 March 2012 in Ramoji Film City, Hyderabad. Major part of the filming was done in a single schedule which was finished on 15 May 2012. On 30 May 2012, it was announced that filming was completed and that the film would be released in July 2012. Unit members reveal that Puri catered exactly 35 days for regular shooting. This took place in the Annapurna Studios. This was followed by a set of 14 days catered exclusively for the canning of the songs, and another 10 days were catered to shoot the action sequences. That way, the entire film got over in just two months.

== Soundtrack ==
The film's soundtrack and background score were composed by Raghu Kunche with Bhaskarabhatla Ravikumar penning all the lyrics. The audio of the film was released on 22 June 2012 through Sony Music India label in market and launch of the audio was held at a private auditorium in Hyderabad on same day. The audio received positive response from critics and audience.

=== Track list ===
The Track list consists of 6 songs all composed by Raghu Kunche and all written by Bhaskarabhatla Ravi Kumar with Raghu Kunche singing 2 of the songs and Shreya Ghoshal, Suchitra, Udit Narayan, Chinmayi, Adnan Sami, Joanna and Anjana Soumya crooning the rest.

Track list
No.	Title	Singer(s)	Length
1.	"Subba Lakshmi"	Raghu Kunche	4:46
2.	"Nuvvele Nuvvele"	Shreya Ghoshal	5:07
3.	"Disturb Chettanade"	Suchitra	3:41
4.	"Yemi Sethura"	Udit Narayan, Chinmayi	4:02
5.	"Nuvvantey Chala"	Adnan Sami, Joanna	4:11
6.	"Devuda Devuda"	Raghu Kunche, Anjana Soumya	3:24
Total length:			24:31

=== Reception ===
The audio received positive reviews. Sirish A. of Musicperk.com gave a review terming the album "An album with high dose of mass appeal" and rating it 6.5/10 picking 'Subba Lakshmi' and 'Nuvvele Nuvvele' as the picks of the Album.

== Release ==
The film was released worldwide on 14 August 2012.

=== Critical reception ===
Devudu Chesina Manushulu received mixed-to-negative reviews from critics. Mahesh Koneru of 123telugu.com gave a review of 2.25/5 and commented that "'Devudu Chesina Manushulu' is a surprisingly poor offering from Ravi Teja and Puri Jagan. The movie fails to entertain on any level. Strong and hard hitting dialogues are expected in a Puri Jagan movie and he disappoints this time. Except for a few moments of humour and one or two nice lines, there is nothing to rave about in this movie. Perhaps, some respect for the intelligence of the viewers should have been shown." Shekhar of OneIndia Entertainment gave a review stating, "Watch the film only if you are a hardcore fan of Ravi Teja. The film can be watched for Puri Jagannath's punch dialogues and Ileana's glamour. After a long time, you feel that you spent your valuable time and money unnecessarily on a Ravi Teja's film." Supergood Movies gave a rating of 2.5/5 stating "Devudu Chesina Manushulu has some good comedy scenes and was targeted to be a mass entertainer. But it missed the target due to poor script". Apherald gave an average review of rating 3/5.

=== Box office ===
The film has collected ₹5.5 crore on its first day.
