= Sri Venkateswara Cine Chitra =

Indian film production company

Sri Venkateswara Cine Chitra India Private Limited
- Company type: Private
- Industry: Entertainment
- Founded: 2003; 23 years ago
- Headquarters: Hyderabad, India
- Key people: B. V. S. N. Prasad; Bhogavalli Bapineedu
- Products: Films
- Owner: B.V.S.N. Prasad

Sri Venkateswara Cine Chitra is an Indian motion picture production, and distribution established by B. V. S. N. Prasad, an Indian film producer. The company was founded in the year 2003 and is based in Hyderabad and had produced several successful Telugu films. In 2012, the production company announced a partnership with Reliance Entertainment. The first film in partnership with Reliance, Devudu Chesina Manushulu was released in August 2012. Designated partners of Sri Venkateswara Cine Chitra are Prasad and Bhogavalli Bapineedu.

== History ==
In 2003 SVCC started their production career with the movie Ee Abbai Chala Manchodu, directed by Agathiyan, starring Ravi Teja, Sangeetha Krish and Vani. After a gap of a year, SVCC produced one of the biggest blockbuster hits of Tollywood, Chatrapathi, directed by S. S. Rajamouli starring Prabhas and Shriya Saran. SVCC uniquely paired in alternate movies with Ravi Teja and Prabhas for their next two movies, Khatarnak starring Ileana D'Cruz and Kajal Aggarwal. The production house gained its popularity, by selecting new scripts always. Darling starring Prabhas was their third film together and this was also a hit at the box office. This was the second movie with Kajal Aggarwal. They paved way to many other huge movies like, Devudu Chesina Manushulu, Ongole Gitta etc.,. They made some movies like Sahasam, starring Gopichand, Taapsee Pannu, which was an action based historic film and it also created a new dimension for Gopichand's career. Attarintiki Daredi starring Pawan Kalyan, Samantha Ruth Prabhu and Pranitha Subhash is again a huge hit yet again at the box office. The movie was written and directed by the ace director Trivikram Srinivas. Their films made their way to box office in the perfect way, Dohchay,Nannaku Prematho were also great at box office. The production house tried a new genre Comedy, starring Allari Naresh, Kruthika Jayakumar directed by G. Nageswara Reddy. Their latest film Radha, with Sharwanand and Lavanya Tripathi is again a flag bearing hit movie at box office.

== Distribution ==
Sri Venkateswara Cine Chitra has also made a huge entry into distribution with Chatrapathi which is self-produced film. Later in 2011 Oosaravelli was also distributed by them. In recent times, S/O Satyamurthy was also distributed under SVCC banner.

== Film production ==
=== SVCC ===
Year	Film	Director	Notes
1986	Driver Babu	Boyina Subba Rao	
1987	Makutamleni Maharaju	K. Bapayya	
1988	Chattam Tho Chadarangam	K. Murali Mohan Rao	
1989	Ontari Poratam	Kovelamudi Raghavendra Rao	
1990	Dagudumuthala Dampathyam	Relangi Narasimha Rao	
1996	Adirindi Alludu	E. V. V. Satyanarayana	
2003	Ee Abbai Chala Manchodu	Agathiyan	
2005	Chatrapathi	S. S. Rajamouli	
2006	Khatarnak	Amma Rajasekhar	
2010	Darling	A. Karunakaran	
2011	Oosaravelli	Surender Reddy	
2012	Devudu Chesina Manushulu	Puri Jagannadh	
2013	Ongole Gitta	Bhaskar	
2013	Sahasam	Chandra Sekhar Yeleti	
2013	Attarintiki Daredi	Trivikram Srinivas	
2015	Dohchay	Sudheer Varma	
2016	Nannaku Prematho	Sukumar	
2016	Intlo Deyyam Nakem Bhayam	G. Nageswara Reddy	
2017	Radha	Chandra Mohan	
2018	Tholi Prema	Venky Atluri	
2019	Mr. Majnu	Venky Atluri	
2020	Solo Brathuke So Better	Subbu Mangadevi	
2021	Ninnila Ninnila	Ani I. V. Sasi	
2022	Ranga Ranga Vaibhavanga	Gireesaaya	
2023	Virupaksha	Karthik Varma Dandu	
2023	Asvins	Tarun Teja	Debut in Tamil cinema
2023	Gandeevadhari Arjuna	Praveen Sattaru	
2024	Star	Elan	Tamil film
2024	Appudo Ippudo Eppudo	Sudheer Varma	
2025	Jack	Bhaskar	
2026	Vrushakarma †	Karthik Varma Dandu	

=== SVCC Digital ===
Year	Film	Director	Note
2022	Bhamakalapam	Abhimanyu Tadimeti	
2022	Ashoka Vanamlo Arjuna Kalyanam	Vidya Sagar Chinta	
2024	Bhamakalapam 2	Abhimanyu Tadimeti	

== Film distribution ==
Year	Film	Note
2005	Chatrapathi	
2011	Oosaravelli	
