= Chatrapathi (2005 film) =

2005 Indian film by S. S. Rajamouli

- DVD cover
- Directed by: S. S. Rajamouli
- Screenplay by: S. S. Rajamoulii
- Dialogues by: M. Rathnam
- Story by: V. Vijayendra Prasad
- Produced by: B. V. S. N. Prasad
- Starring: Prabhas; Shriya Saran; Shafi; Bhanupriya; Pradeep Rawat
- Cinematography: K. K. Senthil Kumar
- Edited by: Kotagiri Venkateswara Rao
- Music by: M. M. Keeravani
- Production company: Sri Venkateswara Cine Chitra
- Distributed by: Sri Venkateswara Cine Chitra
- Release date: 29 September 2005
- Running time: 165 minutes
- Country: India
- Language: Telugu
- Budget: ₹12.5 crore
- Box office: ₹19.25 crore distributors' share

Chatrapathi is a 2005 Indian Telugu-language action drama film directed by S. S. Rajamouli, who also co-wrote the film with V. Vijayendra Prasad. The film stars Prabhas in the title role, Shriya Saran, Bhanupriya in the lead roles alongside Shafi and Pradeep Rawat playing supporting roles. M. M. Keeravani composed the music. The film was produced by B. V. S. N. Prasad on Sri Venkateswara Cine Chitra banner. The film follows Sivaji, a Sri Lankan refugee who gets separated from his mother after his brother Ashok falsely declares him dead. Raised in Visakhapatnam's criminal docks, he grows into a rebel leader hailed as Chhatrapati.

Chatrapathi was released on 29 September 2005 and emerged as a blockbuster, collecting an estimated distributors' share of ₹19.25 crore against a budget of ₹12.5 crore. (Note: The average exchange rate in 2005 was 44.10 Indian rupees (₹) per 1 US dollar (US$).) The film won two Nandi Awards - Best Supporting Actress for Bhanupriya and Best Music Director for Keeravani. The film was remade in Bangladeshi Bangla as Kothor (2007), in Kannada with the same name in 2013 and in Hindi with the same name in 2023.

== Plot ==
In a coastal village in Sri Lanka, a widow named Parvati raises her biological son, Ashok, and her stepson, Sivaji. Although Parvati treats both boys with equal maternal affection, Ashok harbors a deep-seated resentment and jealousy toward Sivaji, refusing to accept him as a brother. When a sudden outbreak of civil war forces the villagers to evacuate by sea, the family is separated in the chaos. Exploiting the situation, Ashok maliciously lies to Parvati, claiming that Sivaji perished in a fire, causing the mother and son to be separated during the migration.

Sivaji ends up on a different refugee boat and arrives at the Visakhapatnam Port in India. There, the refugees are forced into indentured labor under inhumane conditions by Baji Rao, a ruthless local underworld don who controls the port with an iron fist. Years later, Sivaji grows into a fiercely protective and aggressive young man, continuing his search for his missing mother while enduring the port's oppressive regime. During this time, he meets Neelu, a government employee who assists him in his search and eventually falls in love with him. Concurrently, Sivaji crosses paths with an adult Ashok, who has also relocated to Visakhapatnam. Unaware of Ashok's true identity, Sivaji severely thrashes him for harassing a friend's sister. Upon recognizing Sivaji, a vengeful Ashok vows to keep his brother permanently alienated from Parvati, who is living nearby.

The systemic oppression at the port reaches a breaking point when Baji Rao's sadistic lieutenant, Katraju, attacks a young child for trying to depart with his visually impaired mother. Incensed by the cruelty, Sivaji revolts and brutally kills Katraju. In retaliation, Baji Rao launches a coordinated assault on the refugee community, abducting children for human trafficking and murdering Sivaji's close friend, Bhadra. Driven by grief and fury, Sivaji revolts against Baji Rao, destroys his syndicate, and kills him. Reclaiming the port for the refugees, the liberated community hails Sivaji as their savior, crowning him with the title "Chatrapathi." He quickly rises to absolute power in the region, operating an influential vigilante network dedicated to public justice.

Seeking vengeance for his brother's death, Baji Rao's ruthless sibling, Ras Bihari, arrives in Visakhapatnam and aligns with Ashok to destroy Chatrapathi. Following a failed assassination attempt, Ashok further manipulates Parvati, generating intense hatred in her toward Chatrapathi by falsely claiming he shot him and is targeting their family. Upon discovering his mother's whereabouts and learning of Ashok's fabrications, an emotional Sivaji chooses not to reveal his identity. Instead, he anonymously finances their well-being and watches over his mother through Neelu.

The conflict culminates when Ras Bihari abducts Parvati and Ashok, using them as leverage to lure Sivaji to a secluded warehouse. Sivaji arrives and fights Ras Bihari's men. To lure him out, Ras Bihari betrays Ashok, revealing his true malicious intentions and attempting to murder him, prompting Sivaji to intercede to save Ashok's life. Misinterpreting the chaotic violence, a panicked Parvati shoots Sivaji. However, after he falls, she notices a distinct childhood locket around his neck and realizes that Chatrapathi is her long-lost son. Overwhelmed by remorse and love, she embraces him, resulting in an emotional family reunion. Interrupting the moment, Ras Bihari makes one last attempt to kill Sivaji, who brutally kills him after he attempts to slap Parvati. With Ras Bihari eliminated, a reformed Ashok reconciles with Sivaji and the family permanently reunites alongside Neelu.

== Cast ==
- Prabhas as Sivaji / Chatrapathi
  - Manoj Nandam as Young Sivaji
- Bhanupriya as Parvati, Sivaji's step-mother and Ashok's mother
- Shafi as Ashok/Akash, Sivaji's step-brother
  - Teja Sajja as Young Ashok
- Pradeep Rawat as Ras Bihari
- Narendra Jha as Baji Rao
- Supreeth as Katraju, Baji Rao's right-hand man
- Kota Srinivasa Rao as MLA Appala Nayudu
- Shriya Saran as Neelu, Shivaji's girlfriend
- Ajay as Ajay, Sivaji's friend
- Kamal Kamaraju as Sivaji's friend
- Venu Madhav as Mahesh Nanda / Katusumo
- Jaya Prakash Reddy as Commissioner
- Surya as Syed Jaffar Khan
- Subbaraya Sharma as Commissioner's assistant
- Srinivasa Reddy as Appala Nayudu's assistant
- L. B. Sriram as Sattana, Sivaji's neighbor and a tea stall owner
- Jeeva as Boat Agent
- Stunt Silva as Satti, Baji Rao's henchman
- Karate Kalyani as Fisherwoman
- Sekhar as Bhadram, Sivaji's best friend
- SS Kanchi as Clerk in Commissioner's Office
- Raghava as Dr. Vihari
- Y. Vijaya
- Anitha Chowdary
- Mumaith Khan special appearance in the item song "Mannela Tintivira"
- Aarthi Agarwal special appearance in the song "Summa Masuriyaaa"

== Themes ==
In an interview with Idlebrain.com, Rajamouli described Chatrapathi as a "mother sentiment film", which also deals with the exploitation of immigrants who come to India from the places and live without any official identity. When questioned about similarities to the American film Scarface (1983), he said that his father V. Vijayendra Prasad, who wrote Chatrapathi, watched Scarface and got inspired by the point of immigrants' problems, but there were no scenic resemblances between the two films.

== Soundtrack ==
Chatrapathi

Soundtrack album by M. M. Keeravani
- Released: 14 September 2005
- Recorded: 2005
- Genre: Feature film soundtrack
- Length: 31:59
- Language: Telugu
- Label: Aditya Music
- Producer: M. M. Keeravani

M. M. Keeravani chronology
| Allari Bullodu (2005) | Chatrapathi (2005) | Sri Ramadasu (2006) |

The film has seven songs composed by M. M. Keeravani. The track Gundusoodi has been reused from the song Kambangaadu from the Tamil movie Vaaname Ellai (1992) also composed by M. M. Keeravani. The song Agni Skalana was plagiarized from the Main Theme of the video game Myst IV: Revelation (2004) composed by Jack Wall.

Tracklist
| No. | Title | Lyrics | Singer(s) | Length |
|---|---|---|---|---|
| 1. | "A Vachhi B Pai Valli" | Chandra Bose | M. M. Keeravani, Mathangi Jagdish | 4:44 |
| 2. | "Agni Skalana" | Siva Shakti Datta | M. M. Keeravani, Mathangi Jagdish, Manjari | 3:09 |
| 3. | "Summa Masuriyaaa" | Chandra Bose | Sunitha Upadrashta, Smita, Kalyani Malik, Niraj Pandit | 4:40 |
| 4. | "Nallanivanni" | Veturi Sundararama Murthy | K. S. Chithra | 5:30 |
| 5. | "Mannela Tintivira" | Siva Shakti Datta | Tippu, Smita, Karate Kalyani | 4:58 |
| 6. | "Gundusoodi" | Chandra Bose | Sunitha Upadrashta, M. M. Keeravani | 4:18 |
| 7. | "Gala Gala Gala" | Veturi Sundararama Murthy | K. S. Chithra, Jassie Gift, Neerippal | 4:40 |
| Total length: | | | | 31:59 |

== Reception ==
=== Critical reception ===
The Hindu wrote "The film has all the masala ingredients for the present day young generation. Though the storyline is routine, it is the directorial treatment and good screenplay that do the trick for the film." Sify rated the film 2/5 and wrote, "a swell cast with a young action hero and add a dash of digital wizardry to the stunts and cook up an unimaginative script as an aftermath and serve it piping hot! Chhatrapathi works to a certain extent thanks to the tall handsome hunk Prabhas." Jeevi of Idlebrain gave 3.5/5 stars and observed that the film's similarities with Scarface and Deewaar, but opined that it stands on its own owing to Rajamouli's direction and Prabhas' performance.

=== Box office ===
The film had a 100-day run in 54 venues.

== Awards and nominations ==
| Awards | Category | Nominee | Result |
|---|---|---|---|
| Nandi Awards | Best Supporting Actress | Bhanupriya | Won |
| Nandi Awards | Best Music Director | M. M. Keeravani | Won |
| 53rd Filmfare Awards South | Best Film | B. V. S. N. Prasad | Nominated |
| 53rd Filmfare Awards South | Best Director | S. S. Rajamouli | Nominated |
| 53rd Filmfare Awards South | Best Actor | Prabhas | Nominated |
| 53rd Filmfare Awards South | Best Actress | Shriya Saran | Nominated |
| 53rd Filmfare Awards South | Best Supporting Actor | Shafi | Nominated |
| 53rd Filmfare Awards South | Best Supporting Actress | Bhanupriya | Nominated |
| 53rd Filmfare Awards South | Best Comedian | Venu Madhav | Nominated |
| 53rd Filmfare Awards South | Best Villain | Pradeep Rawat | Nominated |
| 53rd Filmfare Awards South | Best Music Director | M. M. Keeravani | Nominated |
| 53rd Filmfare Awards South | Best Lyricist | Shiva Shaki Datta (for song "Agni Skalana") | Nominated |

== Remakes ==
The film was remade in Bangladeshi Bengali as Kothor (2007), and in Kannada with the same name in 2013, with Siddhanth and Priyadarshini. It was remade in Hindi with the same name starring Bellamkonda Sreenivas making his debut in Hindi cinema.
