= Manjri =

Human settlement in Pune district, India

Coordinates: 18°31′N 73°59′E

Manjari is a village 4 km from Hadapsar, India, which is a suburban area around Pune. Manjari Budruk railway station is one of the Pune Suburban Railway located on Pune - Daund section. Mr. Shivraj Ghule is First person of Manjari Village.

Its named after "Manjarai Devi", a traditional Hindu deity. It has Special Economic Zone and Serum Institute of India is located in Manjari, it is well known for developing Covishield vaccine for COVID-19. Manjari is an industrial hotspot and it is close to Keshav Nagar, Hadapsar & Fursungi.
