= Jack (2025 film) =

2025 Indian action comedy film by Bhaskar

- Theatrical release poster
- Directed by: Bommarillu Bhaskar
- Written by: Bommarillu Bhaskar
- Produced by: B. V. S. N. Prasad
- Starring: Siddhu Jonnalagadda; Vaishnavi Chaitanya; Prakash Raj
- Cinematography: Vijay K. Chakravarthy
- Edited by: Navin Nooli
- Music by: Achu Rajamani; Sam C. S.; Suresh Bobbili
- Production company: Sri Venkateswara Cine Chitra
- Release date: 10 April 2025
- Country: India
- Language: Telugu

Jack is a 2025 Indian Telugu-language spy action comedy film written and directed by Bommarillu Bhaskar and produced by B. V. S. N. Prasad under the banner of Sri Venkateswara Cine Chitra. The film stars Siddhu Jonnalagadda, Vaishnavi Chaitanya, and Prakash Raj. Jack was released on 10 April 2025 to negative reviews.

== Plot ==
Pablo Neruda alias "Jack" is a good at nothing guy who gives a try at everything but fails to master them. His father is concerned about what he would become. But being a topper in engineering and rejecting all the jobs and choosing an aim to become one, he didn't reveal his aim to his father Prasad, which makes him more worried. To know his secret aim at any cost, he approaches a Detective Agency chief Khalid Mia who runs CAT Detective Agency. Then Khalid assigns this task to his daughter Afshana to know Jack's profession. Soon, Afshana introduced herself as Bhanumathi, one of his childhood friends and starts observing him. When observing Jack realizes and starts playing tricks. However, upon trying to catch a crook Afshana spots him. Later in the movie Afshana accidentally unties some bad guys forcing the hero to chase after them to try and return them back.

== Cast ==
- Siddhu Jonnalagadda as Pablo Neruda alias "Jack", a R&AW aspirant
- Vaishnavi Chaitanya as Detective Afshana alias Bhanumati "Bhanu"
- Prakash Raj as Agent Manoj, operations head R&AW
- Naresh as Prasad, YouTuber and Jack's father
- Brahmaji as Detective Khalid Mia, Cat Detective Agency chief and Afshana's father
- Rahul Dev as Ata-ur-Rahman
- Shabeer Kallarakkal as South
- Subbaraju as Pradeep Ranganathan IPS, a R&AW aspirant and Jack's trusted friend and aid
- Ravi Prakash as Manoj's assistant
- Sanjay Swaroop as Manoj's boss
- Pushkar
- Ali Reza
- Bindu Chandramouli as Jack's mother
- Yogi Khatri
- Imax Venkat
- Gururaj Manepalli as R&AW interviewer

== Production ==
The film was partially shot in Nepal. The teaser was released on 7 February 2025 and the theatrical trailer was released on 3 April 2025.

== Soundtrack ==
The soundtrack is composed by Achu Rajamani, Sam C. S. and Suresh Bobbili.

Track listing
| No. | Title | Lyrics | Music | Singer(s) | Length |
|---|---|---|---|---|---|
| 1. | "Pablo Neruda" | Vanamali | Achu Rajamani | Benny Dayal | 3:05 |
| 2. | "Kiss" | Sanare | Suresh Bobbili | Javed Ali, Amala Chebolu | 3:51 |
| 3. | "Dettadi" | Varikuppala Yadagiri | Achu Rajamani | Jaspreet Jasz, Sahithi Chaganti | 3:00 |

== Reception ==
The Times of India rated the film 2.5 out if 5 and stated, "Bommarillu Bhaskar aims to deliver a slick, stylised spy comedy, but the film's inconsistent tone and uneven writing end up diluting the impact". Calling it an "unconvincing, tedious narrative", The Hindu's Sangeetha Devi Dundoo and opined that the script is flawed. Echoing the same, India Today rated it 1.5 out of 5.
