= Virupaksha (film) =

2023 film directed by Karthik Varma Dandu

- Theatrical release poster
- Directed by: Karthik Varma Dandu
- Written by: Karthik Varma Dandu
- Screenplay by: Sukumar
- Story by: Karthik Varma Dandu
- Dialogues by: Krishna Hari
- Produced by: B. V. S. N. Prasad; Sukumar
- Starring: Sai Durgha Tej; Samyuktha
- Cinematography: Shamdat Sainudeen
- Edited by: Navin Nooli
- Music by: B. Ajaneesh Loknath
- Production companies: Sri Venkateswara Cine Chitra; Sukumar Writings
- Release date: 21 April 2023
- Running time: 146 minutes
- Country: India
- Language: Telugu
- Box office: ₹122.85 crore

Virupaksha is a 2023 Indian Telugu-language horror thriller film directed by Karthik Varma Dandu, who co-wrote the script with Sukumar. Produced by B. V. S. N. Prasad and Sukumar under their respective banners, the film stars Sai Durgha Tej and Samyuktha Menon alongside Rajeev Kanakala, Sunil, Brahmaji, Ajay, and Ravi Krishna in supporting roles. The film follows Surya as he visits his ancestral village, Rudravanam, where a series of unexplained deaths uncovers a deadly curse tied to dark rituals, pushing him to solve the mystery before the village faces doom.

Karthik Varma was inspired to create Virupaksha after reading about a Gujarati woman accused of black magic. Initially, he struggled to secure producers for the film. In 2018, Sukumar joined the project, refining the script and helping bring in producer B. V. S. N. Prasad and actor Sai Dharam Tej. Filming took place in Araku and Paderu, with sets built in Hyderabad. Production was briefly halted when Sai Dharam Tej was injured in a bike accident in 2021 but resumed after his recovery.

Released on 21 April 2023, Virupaksha received positive reviews for its engaging story, direction, and performances, with particular praise for the lead actors and technical aspects like cinematography and editing. The film was a commercial success and ranked among the highest-grossing Telugu films of the year.

== Plot ==
In 1979, in the village of Rudravanam, Venkata Chalapathy and his wife are lynched by the villagers, who believe their eerie rituals (black magic) caused multiple deaths. As she dies, Chalapathy's wife curses the village with destruction in 12 years. Their son, Bhairava, is spared and sent to an orphanage by the village head, Harishchandra Prasad.

In 1991, a week after the mysterious disappearance of a villager named Siddhayya, Anasuyamma returns to Rudravanam with her son, Surya, and nephew to donate land for a school and attend the annual carnival honouring the Hindu deity Modamamba. Surya's encounter with Nandini, Harishchandra Prasad's daughter, results in love, and she apparently reciprocates but hesitates to accept his proposal.

During the festival, Siddhayya, who has developed a severe pox after being mauled by a supernatural crow, returns to the village temple and dies in the inner sanctum, which is considered sacrilege. The head priest declares that the village is desecrated and must be sealed off for eight days in eight directions. Surya and his family are allowed to leave as they have been away for over 12 years. However, Surya reenters the village to deliver medicine to Nandini, who suffers from convulsions, rendering him incapable of leaving the village for eight days.

Sudha, Nandini's friend, attempts to elope with her lover Kumar, but tragically witnesses his accidental death when he is run over by a train. Upon returning to the village, Sudha is killed by a swarm of bees. Her parents conceal her death to avoid shame. Soon after, the milkman Suri and Surya's cousin Parvathi are found dead under mysterious circumstances. Surya, aided by an RMP (Registered Medical Practitioner), investigates and uncovers a disturbing pattern: each victim witnesses a death before their own demise, passing the curse onto the next person. An Aghora warns the villagers that they made a mistake by imposing the lockdown.

Surya discovers Sudha's body and uncovers the truth behind the chain of deaths. He realises that Nandini is the next target. As she contemplates suicide, Surya intervenes and saves her. Surya learns about the tragic events that befell the Chalapathy family in the past and suspects that Chalapathy's son, Bhairava, is behind the killings. Meanwhile, the head priest suggests that sacrificing Nandini will end the curse, but Surya sedates her and vows to find a way to stop it.

Surya investigates Bhairava's whereabouts and learns that Bhairava fled the orphanage after paralysing its founder. With the help of the Aghora, Surya locates Bhairava's hideout in a cave, where he finds Bhairava's belongings and the original village edict, which had been replaced by a fake one. Surya concludes that Kumar is actually Bhairava and that someone from the village has been aiding him in executing the curse. Surya also uncovers that Nandini's sacrifice is part of a larger plot to destroy the village. As Surya rushes to stop the ritual, superstitious residents of nearby villages block his way, fearing the curse will spread to their homes. Despite the obstacles, Surya manages to return, only to find that the villagers of Rudravanam have already been possessed and are performing the ritual.

Surya suspects Harishchandra Prasad is involved but learns that Nandini is actually Chalapathy's daughter, whose identity was hidden by Harishchandra Prasad. Confronting Nandini, Surya discovers that she, along with her brother Bhairava, has been seeking revenge on the village for wrongfully accusing her father of black magic. Nandini reveals that Chalapathy was an Atharvana Veda practitioner who was trying to cure his paralysed wife, but the villagers misunderstood his practices. Nandini refuses to stop the ritual, but Surya reminds her of their love. Bound by a talisman that prevents her from harming him, she hints that he must kill her to stop the curse. With great reluctance, Surya stabs Nandini, ending the curse and saving the village.

After Nandini's cremation, Surya urges the villagers to abandon their superstitions and transform Chalapathy's house into a school. As he holds the talisman, his eyes glow with a supernatural light, hinting at a possible sequel.

== Cast ==
- Sai Dharam Tej as Surya
- Samyuktha as Nandini
  - Yodha Kandrathi as young Nandini
- Sunil as Abbai Raju, a villager
- Rajeev Kanakala as Harishchandra Prasad, Nandini's adoptive father
- Brahmaji as RMP Doctor Koti
- Ravi Krishna as Bhairava Kumar alias Kumar
  - Harsh Roshan as young Bhairava
- Abhinav Gomatam as Surya's cousin
- Kamal Kamaraju as Venkata Chalapathy, Nandini's biological father
- Kamakshi Bhaskarla as Venkata Chalapathy's wife
- Sai Chand as the head priest
- Ajay as Aghora
- Soniya Singh as Sudha
- Niharika as Anasuyamma
- Rajasekhar Aningi as orphanage caretaker
- Meka Sivaramakrishna as orphanage founder
- Syamala as Parvati
- Chatrapathi Sekhar as Sivayya, Parvati's husband
- Bhel Prasad as Sattayya, Sudha’s father
- Naveen Neni as Upparam, Sudha’s brother-in-law
- Mahesh Achanta as Sastry, the RMP's acquaintance from neighboring village

== Production ==
=== Development ===
After Bham Bolenath, I firmly decided to make an impactful horror film and that’s when I came across a news article about residents of a North Indian village stoning a widow to death over suspicion about her black magic practices. The incident shocked me on multiple levels: the probability that black magic is still being practised and an entire village killing someone just because of a suspicion without even verifying if it’s true or informing the matter to police. And it isn’t an individual’s mistake; the entire village is complicit. That’s where the idea emerged from. What if she was really practising black magic? The whole village might have been cursed.

— Karthik Varma Dandu

Karthik Varma Dandu, who previously directed Bham Bolenath (2015) and worked as a writer for Karthikeya (2014), was inspired by his passion for horror genre to create a pure horror film, distinct from the prevalent trend of horror comedies. The idea for Virupaksha originated in 2016–17 after he read about a Gujarati woman accused of practicing black magic and stoned to death by villagers. Shocked by the incident and the collective superstition, he imagined a scenario where the woman actually had magical powers, leading to a village curse. He developed the script while staying in Araku and Paderu, which later served as filming locations during production.

Karthik Varma set the film in 1991, using the era's superstitions to create a convincing setting. The story unfolds in the fictional village of Rudravanam, located in a forest, to enhance the atmosphere. While the village is not tribal, it is portrayed as a community of minimally educated individuals governed by a panchayat and a sarpanch. Despite its structure, the villagers remain deeply rooted in superstitions. The film also explores the theme of science versus blind faith, with the sarpanch being uneducated and the villagers blindly following the priest. This theme is emphasised when Surya urges the villagers to build a school, symbolising the shift towards education and reason.

During the writing stage, Karthik Varma had several gruesome death ideas, but some were removed after Sukumar advised against excessive gore. While the film includes a few jump scares, such as a crow hitting the windshield early on, Karthik Varma focused on building tension and mood rather than relying on cheap thrills. This approach aimed to unsettle the audience and emphasize genuine horror over easy scares. The character names were thoughtfully chosen to align with the film's themes. "Virupaksha" and "Rudravanam" are associated with Lord Siva, while Nandini's name was inspired by Nandi, Siva's vehicle. The protagonist, Surya, symbolises the light that dispels the village's darkness. The title Virupaksha translates to "an eye that doesn’t have a form," reflecting the film's underlying supernatural elements.

Securing producers was initially difficult for Karthik Varma, as his previous film Bham Bholenath was not commercially successful, and Virupaksha required a larger budget. Recognising that only a director might understand his vision, Karthik Varma sought support from directors who had ventured into production. His story eventually reached Sukumar through Ashok Bandreddi, who managed Sukumar Writings. Impressed by the concept, Sukumar agreed to produce the film in 2018. Sukumar worked with Karthik Varma to refine the screenplay, adding dramatic elements and expanding its scope while keeping the horror tone intact. During the writing process, Karthik Varma and Sukumar worked through multiple versions of each scene. Sukumar encouraged Karthik Varma to improve the drafts, and they would choose the best one after analysing the options. He also suggested key additions, such as a thrilling climax and unique murder sequences. Sukumar's involvement brought credibility to the project, leading to further support from producer B. V. S. N. Prasad and actor Sai Dharam Tej.

=== Casting ===
Sukumar suggested casting Sai Dharam Tej in the lead role, believing the shift from commercial films to a project like Virupaksha would showcase his versatility and earn critical acclaim. Tej immediately agreed after hearing the narration in 2019, calling it one of the best stories he had encountered. To portray the character authentically, he adapted to the 1990s-era dynamics, particularly the way men interacted with women during that time.

Karthik Varma chose Samyuktha Menon for the role of Nandini, believing her relatively recent experience in the industry was a good fit for the character. Although she did not speak Telugu at the time, Samyuktha hired a tutor to learn the language and ensure an authentic performance. Ravi Krishna, who played another important role, was chosen by an assistant director after impressing in auditions.

=== Filming ===
The world-building of the fictional village, Rudravanam, was achieved through a combination of real locations and sets. To authentically depict the period and social dynamics of the story, set in 1979 and 1991, the production team constructed the village in a forested area. The exteriors and streets of the village were filmed in Araku and Paderu, while the haunted house and the Sarpanch's house were created as sets in Hyderabad.

Director Karthik Varma, along with cinematographer Shamdat Sainudeen and art director Sri Nagendra Tangala, was intentional about the village's layout. The temple, symbolising positive energy, was placed near the village entrance, while the abandoned house, symbolising negative energy, was located at the opposite end. The water bodies in the village were designed to resemble eyes when viewed from above, reflecting the film's theme of eye contact. Shamdat suggested adding a second water body to enhance this symbolism, and the abandoned house was designed with two windows resembling eyes.

The film employed an earthy colour palette, which was carefully chosen to match the mood of the story. Colourist Vivek played a crucial role in grading the frames to complement the film's tone. Approximately 70% of the film was shot at night, primarily in forested areas, presenting challenges for the cast and crew. However, director Karthik Varma, who had written the script with similar settings in mind, found the process manageable. Cinematographer Shamdat drew inspiration from Hollywood films and collaborated with Varma to create a lighting style that complemented the supernatural themes.

Filming faced a significant setback in September 2021 when lead actor Sai Dharam Tej was injured in a serious bike accident, resulting in a 22-day delay. During this time, Tej underwent extensive rehabilitation, including speech therapy and dance classes, to regain his strength and improve his dialogue delivery. Director Karthik Varma used the break to refine the script and storyboard. After Tej's recovery, filming resumed, and the actor successfully completed his portions.

=== Post-production ===
Karthik Varma created detailed storyboards for most of the film, with the exception of a few drama scenes. The team collaborated with the computer graphics supervisor to design custom assets, including the crows, which were significant to the story. Rather than using pre-made 3D models, they built everything from scratch, giving them full creative control over the process, including rigging and texturing. The visual effects were handled by DTM VFX Skool, a Kerala-based company known for their work on Kantara (2022).

Sound design played a crucial role in enhancing the storytelling of the film. Karthik Varma incorporated specific sound instructions into the script itself. For example, in the opening scene, the sound of a rope being tied to a tree was emphasized before the visual was revealed, creating a sense of suspense. Additionally, a high-pitched ringing sound was used during Parvati's introduction to symbolise her ear pain. Audiographer M. R. Rajakrishnan significantly contributed to shaping the film's soundscape, with innovative ideas that enhanced the overall auditory experience.

== Music ==
Virupaksha

Soundtrack album by B. Ajaneesh Loknath
- Released: 22 April 2023
- Recorded: 2022–2023
- Genre: Feature film soundtrack
- Length: 12:15
- Language: Telugu
- Label: Sony Music India

B. Ajaneesh Loknath chronology
Raghavendra Stores (2023)	Virupaksha (2023)	Hostel Hudugaru Bekagiddare (2023)

Singles from Virupaksha
- 1. "Nachavule Nachavule" Released: 24 March 2023; 2. "Kalallo" Released: 17 April 2023

External audio
- Audio Jukebox on YouTube

B. Ajaneesh Loknath composed the background score and songs for Virupaksha. He joined the project after the first schedule, having been previously approached by Karthik Varma for Bham Bolenath, a collaboration that did not materialise due to budget constraints.

The first song, "Nachavule Nachavule," was released on 24 March 2023, followed by "Kalallo" on 17 April 2023. However, editor Naveen Nooli suggested removing the song "Kalallo" just three days before the film's release, believing its exclusion would improve the film's overall impact. Sukumar, agreed with this suggestion, leading to the song's removal from the final cut.

Track listing
No.	Title	Lyrics	Singer(s)	Length
1.	"Nachavule Nachavule"	Krishna Kanth	Karthik	3:42
2.	"Kalallo"	Ananta Sriram	Anurag Kulkarni, Madhushree	3:44
3.	"Ragile Jwaale"	Krishna Kanth	B. Ajaneesh Loknath	4:49
Total length:				12:15

== Release ==
The film had a theatrical release on 21 April 2023 in Telugu. The film was dubbed and theatrically released in Hindi, Tamil, Kannada and Malayalam languages on 5 May 2023. The digital and satellite rights of the film were acquired by Netflix and Star Maa respectively. The film premiered on 21 May 2023 on Netflix. It premiered on television on 25 June 2023 on Star Maa.

== Reception ==
Virupaksha received positive reviews from critics. Sangeetha Devi Dundoo of The Hindu praised the story and work by Karthik Varma Dandu. She further praised the production design, editing and cinematography done by Srinagendra Tangala, Navin Nooli and Shamdat Sainudeen. Raghu Bandi of The Indian Express also praised the direction, and story written by Karthik Varma Dandu along with performances of lead actors, particularly Samyuktha Menon's. Neeshita Nyayapati of The Times of India wrote, "Virupaksha is a well-crafted film – the kind that makes you look at the characters beyond the actors because the film has a suffocating atmosphere that'll draw you in."

Latha Srinivasan of India Today gave 3 out of 5 stars and wrote, "While the climax of the film may appeal to some and not to others, the film focuses on superstitions which some people in the country still believe in. It should be food for thought. On the whole, the film is a good entertainer." The Hans India wrote that story, screenplay, sound design and performance of lead actors, are the major positives of the film.

== Accolades ==
Award (Note: Awards, festivals and organizations are in alphabetical order.)	Date of ceremony (Note: Date is linked to the article about the awards held that year, wherever possible.)	Category	Recipient(s)	Result	Ref.
Filmfare Awards South	3 August 2024	Best Director – Telugu	Karthik Varma Dandu	Nominated	
Filmfare Awards South	3 August 2024	Best Supporting Actress – Telugu	Shyamala	Nominated	
Santosham Film Awards	2 December 2023	Best Actress	Samyuktha	Won	
South Indian International Movie Awards	14 September 2024	Best Film – Telugu	Sri Venkateswara Cine Chitra, Sukumar Writings	Nominated	
South Indian International Movie Awards	14 September 2024	Best Director – Telugu	Karthik Varma Dandu	Nominated	
South Indian International Movie Awards	14 September 2024	Best Cinematographer – Telugu	Shamdat	Nominated	
South Indian International Movie Awards	14 September 2024	Best Actor	Sai Dharam Tej	Nominated	
South Indian International Movie Awards	14 September 2024	Best Actress – Telugu	Samyuktha	Nominated	
South Indian International Movie Awards	14 September 2024	Best Supporting Actor – Telugu	Ravi Krishna	Nominated	
South Indian International Movie Awards	14 September 2024	Best Supporting Actress – Telugu	Soniya Singh	Nominated	
