= Nannaku Prematho =

2016 Indian film by Sukumar

- Theatrical release poster
- Directed by: Sukumar
- Screenplay by: Sukumar
- Story by: Sukumar; Hussain Sha Kiran
- Produced by: B. V. S. N. Prasad
- Starring: N. T. Rama Rao Jr.; Jagapathi Babu; Rajendra Prasad; Rakul Preet Singh
- Cinematography: Vijay K. Chakravarthy
- Edited by: Naveen Nooli
- Music by: Devi Sri Prasad
- Production company: Sri Venkateswara Cine Chitra
- Distributed by: Reliance Entertainment; Phantom Films
- Release date: 13 January 2016
- Running time: 168 minutes
- Country: India
- Language: Telugu
- Budget: ₹45–50 crore
- Box office: est. ₹87–132 crore

Nannaku Prematho (transl. To father, with love) is a 2016 Indian Telugu-language action drama film written and directed by Sukumar and produced by B. V. S. N. Prasad under Sri Venkateswara Cine Chitra, Bhogavalli Bapineedu and Reliance Entertainment. The film, set in London, stars N. T. Rama Rao Jr., Jagapathi Babu, Rajendra Prasad and Rakul Preet Singh. Nannaku Prematho marks the 25th film of Rama Rao Jr. as an actor.

The film follows Abhiram (N. T. Rama Rao Jr.), an expatriate in London, who discovers his dying father, Subrahmanyam (Rajendra Prasad), was ruined by businessman Krishna Murthy Kautilya (Jagapathi Babu). Abhiram embarks on a 30-day revenge plan, employing intellect and manipulation amidst family conflicts and corporate warfare, to dismantle Kautilya's empire and fulfill his father's last wish.

Devi Sri Prasad has composed the film's music and background score. The cinematography was provided by Vijay C Chakravarthy, and Naveen Nooli edited the film. Principal photography commenced in August 2015. The audio launch of this film was held on 27 December 2015. The film was released worldwide on 13 January 2016 to positive reviews and was successful at the box office. The film was a commercial success, grossing ₹84–86 crore worldwide and becoming the fifth highest-grossing Telugu film of 2016. The film was remade in Bengali as Baazi (2021).

== Plot ==
Abhiram is the youngest son of Subrahmanyam, a London-based entrepreneur. Choosing to forge his own path, Abhi resigns from his job, establishes his own engineering firm called KMC Pipes and Canals, and successfully completes its maiden infrastructure project in Spain. His life shifts focus when he learns that his father is suffering from terminal pancreatic cancer, with only a month left to live. On his deathbed, Subrahmanyam discloses his true identity as Ramesh Chandra Prasad, once London's wealthiest magnate. He reveals that Krishna Murthy Kautilya, a deceptive associate, systematically defrauded him, seized his global business empire, and forced him to rebuild his life under an assumed name. Prasad asks his three sons to avenge his stolen legacy.

While Abhi's eldest brother merely fabricates a story about filing a lawsuit to pacify their dying father, Abhi resolves to take decisive action. Vowing to dismantle Krishna Murthy’s multi-billion-dollar empire within 30 days, he recruits three dedicated young professionals who share a profound emotional bond with their own fathers. To infiltrate Krishna Murthy's inner circle, Abhi targets his daughter, Divyanka. He carefully orchestrates a scenario to rescue her from a staged kidnapping and subsequently bankrupts his own family accounts to purchase a ₹25 crore art piece as a birthday gift for her, successfully earning her romantic affection. However, when Abhi attends Divya’s birthday gala to confront his target, Krishna Murthy reveals that he is entirely aware of Abhi's identity and ulterior motives. Meanwhile, Prasad's medical condition takes a critical turn, forcing his hospitalization.

Displeased by Abhi's massive financial expenditures on the art piece, his brothers sever ties with him. Concurrently, Krishna Murthy covertly plants an audio bug in Abhi's headquarters, exposing his retaliatory strategy; upon overhearing the recordings, a heartbroken Divya terminates her relationship with Abhi. Krishna Murthy subsequently travels to Spain to finalize his acquisition of the "People Oil and Natural Gas" project—a massive, lucrative energy reserve belonging to a businessman named Kapil Sinha. Abhi tracks them to Spain but is promptly abducted by Divya's security personnel, who intend to extract his operational plans. Instead, Abhi uses the opportunity to win back her trust. He reunites Divya with her long-estranged mother, who has been incarcerated since Divya's childhood, and exposes a dark family secret.

Years prior, Krishna Murthy had planted illicit narcotics in his family's luggage during an international trip. When airport customs intercepted the contraband, Krishna Murthy abandoned his wife to secure his own freedom and protect his corporate reputation. Appalled by the revelation of her father's utter cold heartedness, Divya turns against him. Seeking a lethal counterstrike, Krishna Murthy spoofs Abhi's identity to send a false emergency message to Abhi's brother, Vamsi, claiming their father has died. When an angry Vamsi arrives at the hospital, Krishna Murthy delivers a celebratory bouquet to the room containing a venomous deathstalker scorpion, which bites Abhi. The tycoon sends a series of cryptic riddles detailing the location of the rare antidote, orchestrating a dangerous sequence that imperils the lives of all three brothers. Abhi successfully deciphers the clues, administers the cure to save his siblings, and is briefly arrested on a manipulated pharmaceutical charge before his reconciled brothers bail him out.

However, the corporate warfare shifts in Abhi's favor. It is revealed that the painting he gifted housed a hidden surveillance camera, allowing him to anticipate Krishna Murthy's every move. Next, Abhi breaches the tycoon's primary offshore accounts, transferring ₹40,000 crore directly to his family's corporate assets. Furthermore, the Spanish oil field Krishna Murthy aggressively acquired is exposed as an elaborate hoax: the natural gas reserves were entirely simulated via sub-surface tunnels constructed by Abhi's KMC company—revealed to stand for Krishna Murthy Mosam Chese ("Cheating Krishna Murthy") Company. Kapil Sinha is revealed to be Satpal Singh, Prasad's loyal former advisor who has been anchoring Abhi's sting operation from the start.

Completely bankrupt and ruined, Krishna Murthy is reduced to the exact destitute condition he once inflicted upon his rival, forcing him to flee, adopt a fraudulent identity, and rename himself Subrahmanyam. Divya and her mother permanently sever ties with him to live with Abhi's household. Ramesh Chandra Prasad succumbs to his illness, passing away peacefully with a smile after witnessing the complete structural demolition of his enemy. At the funeral, the family gathers to mourn. However, a stoic Abhi suppresses his tears, maintaining a deeply held conviction that his father’s spiritual presence will only truly depart the day he allows himself to cry.

== Cast ==
- N. T. Rama Rao Jr. as Abhiram "Abhi"
- Jagapathi Babu as Krishna Murthy Kautilya, Divyanka's father
- Rajendra Prasad as Ramesh Chandra Prasad alias Subrahmanyam, Abhiram's father
- Rakul Preet Singh as Divyanka "Divya", Krishnamurthy's daughter
- Rajiv Kanakala as Vamsi, Abhiram's elder brother
- Srinivas Avasarala as Sai, Abhiram's second elder brother
- Ashish Vidyarthi as Satpal Singh / Kapil Sinha
- Madhoo as Divya's mother (Cameo appearance)
- Thagubothu Ramesh as Abhiram's assistant
- Naveen Neni as Abhiram's assistant
- Liza van der Smissen as Kate
- Noel Sean as Noel
- Vajja Venkata Giridhar as Giri, Krishna Murthy's assistant
- Amit Tiwari as JD, Krishna Murthy's PA
- Vennela Kishore as the guy who sells the painting to Abhiram

== Production ==
=== Development ===
In April 2015, Sukumar came up with the story of the film. In July 2015, the film's shooting had started, and by December, the post-production was done. The film's first look poster was released on 17 September 2015 on the occasion of Vinayaka Chavithi. The film's teaser was released on 21 October 2015 on the occasion of the Vijayadasami (Dasara) festival. The teaser created a record of being the most liked and viewed Telugu film teaser at the time. Another poster was released as a Deepavali Special, featuring a dancing still of Jr. NTR.

=== Casting ===
Rakul Preet Singh was selected to play the female lead role opposite Jr. NTR. Rajendra Prasad plays the role of Jr. NTR's father in this film. Initially, it was rumoured that Jagapati Babu and NTR's own father Nandamuri Harikrishna were approached to play NTR's father role in the movie, but due to some reasons, both had refused. Jagapati Babu instead played the main negative role.

=== Filming ===
Principal photography commenced in the United Kingdom. It was a 40-day schedule where all the actors took part. The MRMC Bolt High Speed Cinebot, the fastest camera robot in the world, which is used to obtain shots of extremely high speed objects with absolute detail, was used in some crucial scenes during the UK schedule. After wrapping up the UK schedule, the team returned to Hyderabad. While Sukumar was directing Nannaku Prematho, he was simultaneously producing the movie Kumari 21F, so he took a break because Kumari 21F was nearing its release date. The Nannaku Prematho team then finished some part of the title song shoot in Hyderabad near Toopran. Afterwards, the team shifted to Spain for the final schedule of the film. The movie team wrapped up its Spain schedule by late-November 2015. Finally, the team shifted back to Hyderabad to shoot a final scene sequence. On 30 December 2015, the filmmakers announced that the film's shooting was wrapped.

== Soundtrack ==
Nannaku Prematho

Soundtrack album by Devi Sri Prasad
- Released: 27 December 2015
- Recorded: 2015
- Genre: Film soundtrack
- Length: 19:54
- Language: Telugu
- Label: Times Music
- Producer: Devi Sri Prasad

Devi Sri Prasad chronology
Nenu Sailaja (2016)	Nannaku Prematho (2015)	Sardaar Gabbar Singh (2016)

Music of this film was composed by Devi Sri Prasad, who collaborated for the fifth time with both Jr. NTR and Sukumar. The audio rights were bought by Junglee Music.

After the death of Satyamurthy, Prasad's father and former film screenplay and story writer, the album was dedicated to the former in an audio launch ceremony on 27 December 2015.

For the fifth time in his career, Jr. NTR lent his vocals for a jazz-style number called Follow Follow.

Telugu track listing (original)
No.	Title	Lyrics	Singer(s)	Length
1.	"Follow Follow"	Devi Sri Prasad	Jr. NTR	03:38
2.	"Naa Manasu Neelo"	Bhaskarabhatla Ravi Kumar	Devi Sri Prasad, Sharmila	04:21
3.	"Don't Stop"	Chandrabose	Raghu Dixit	03:53
4.	"Love Me Again"	Chandrabose	Sooraj Santhosh	04:06
5.	"Love Dhebba"	Chandrabose	Deepak, Sravana Bhargavi, Chorus	03:56
6.	"Nannaku Prematho"	Devi Sri Prasad	Sagar, Devi Sri Prasad	03:04
Total length:				22:58

Behindwoods.com gave the soundtrack 4 out of 5 stars, stating that " Nannaku Prematho is a fun album with ample dose of trendy as well as mass numbers with a tinge of experimentation. All in all, it is another winner in the combo of Sukumar- DSP!". Another film news website, Indiaglitz.com, also rated the album 3 out of 5 stars and stated that "Devi Sri Prasad, Sukumar and NTR are an exciting combination. This album brings out this uniqueness in its choice of lyrics. It is not vintage DSP at his best. All that you can expect from this album is good dose of energy and verve, DSP-style, NTR-style". 123telugu.com quoted this album as a "different album from the crazy combo" and finally stated that "On the whole, the audio of Nannaku Prematho is quite different from Devi Sri Prasad's regular albums. Even though the tunes are not in the regular commercial format, they are elevated well by some meaningful and catchy lyrics."

== Distribution ==
The overseas theatrical distribution rights were acquired by CineGalaxy Inc. for ₹6.2 crores. RansiTech Solutions Ltd. bagged the UK distribution rights in late October 2015 "Reliance" Raghu of Shantha Pictures acquired the Ceded distribution Rights for ₹7.2 crores. This is the highest price offered to any movie in this region after Baahubali: The Beginning, which was bought for ₹13 crores.

== Marketing ==
=== Home media ===
The post-theatrical streaming rights were acquired by Sun NXT, while the satellite rights for the Telugu version were acquired by Gemini TV. Zee Cinema bought satellite rights for the Hindi Version titled as Family - Ek Deal.

== Box office ==
Nannaku Prematho grossed ₹68.5 crore (US$7.1 million) worldwide in the first nine days. By the end of its second week had grossed ₹80 crore (US$8.3 million).

== Critical reception ==
Times of India rated the film 3.5/5, and wrote, "(The flaws) should be no reason to miss this film because Nannaku Prematho is like a delectable serving of dessert with a hint of tang. The flavour may seem out of place initially because you aren't used to it. But if you try it with an open mind, you'd probably savour it."

Idlebrain.com gave it 3.25/5 and wrote, "The underlying emotion of father-son gets fused in the complex screenplay and the mind games between hero and villain. It's a great effort by Sukumar in terms of screenplay and logic. On a whole, Nannaku Prematho is a commendable and extraordinary concept thriller made on grand scale."

Business Standard stated that NTR, particularly, needs to be lauded for not playing to the gallery and choosing to work with a director who isn't afraid to go against the tide. This is precisely why you want to appreciate Sukumar, who, by all means, could have safely made a regular commercial potboiler. But he didn't, and that's what differentiates him from other filmmakers as he made this film an action thriller with memorable twists. "Nannaku Prematho", on the whole, isn't a bad film as it was made even more sensibly.

== Accolades ==
Ceremony	Category	Nominee	Result	Ref.
64th Filmfare Awards South	Filmfare Award for Best Film – Telugu	Sri Venkateswara Cine Chitra	Nominated	
64th Filmfare Awards South	Filmfare Award for Best Director – Telugu	Sukumar	Nominated	
64th Filmfare Awards South	Filmfare Award for Best Actor – Telugu	Jr. NTR	Won	
64th Filmfare Awards South	Filmfare Award for Best Actress – Telugu	Rakul Preet Singh	Nominated	
64th Filmfare Awards South	Filmfare Award for Best Supporting Actor – Telugu	Jagapati Babu	Won	
64th Filmfare Awards South	Filmfare Award for Best Music Director – Telugu	Devi Sri Prasad	Won	
64th Filmfare Awards South	Filmfare Award for Best Male Playback Singer – Telugu	Jr. NTR (for "Follow Follow")	Nominated	
2nd IIFA Utsavam	Best Picture	Sri Venkateswara Cine Chitra	Nominated	
2nd IIFA Utsavam	Best Director	Sukumar	Nominated	
2nd IIFA Utsavam	Best Actor	N. T. Rama Rao Jr.	Won	
Best Performance In A Negative Role – Male	Jagapati Babu	Won		
6th South Indian International Movie Awards	SIIMA Award for Best Director (Telugu)	Sukumar	Nominated	
6th South Indian International Movie Awards	SIIMA Award for Best Actor (Telugu)	Jr. NTR	Won	
6th South Indian International Movie Awards	SIIMA Award for Best Actress (Telugu)	Rakul Preet Singh	Won	
6th South Indian International Movie Awards	SIIMA Award for Best Actor in a Negative Role (Telugu)	Jagapati Babu	Won	
6th South Indian International Movie Awards	SIIMA Award for Best Male Playback Singer (Telugu)	Devi Sri Prasad (for "Nannaku Prematho")	Nominated	
Mirchi Music Awards South	Star as a Singing Sensation	Jr. NTR (for "Follow Follow")	Won	
Nandi Awards of 2016	Best Actor	N. T. Rama Rao Jr.	Won	
Nandi Awards of 2016	Best Film	B.V.S.N. Prasad	Nominated	
Nandi Awards of 2016	Best Screenplay Writer	Sukumar	Nominated	
Nandi Awards of 2016	Best Director	Sukumar	Nominated	
Nandi Awards of 2016	Best Editor	Naveen Nooli	Won	
Nandi Awards of 2016	Best Villain	Jagapathi Babu	Nominated	
Nandi Awards of 2016	Best Music Director	Devi Sri Prasad	Nominated	
Nandi Awards of 2016	Best Lyricist	Devi Sri Prasad (for "Nannaku Prematho Title Track")	Nominated	
Nandi Awards of 2016	Best Art Director	S. Ravinder	Nominated	
Nandi Awards of 2016	Best Cinematographer	Vijay C Chakravarthy	Nominated	
