= Darling (2010 film) =

2010 Indian film by A. Karunakaran

- Directed by: A. Karunakaran
- Written by: A. Karunakaran
- Produced by: B. V. S. N. Prasad
- Starring: Prabhas; Kajal Aggarwal
- Cinematography: I. Andrew
- Edited by: Kotagiri Venkateswara Rao
- Music by: G. V. Prakash Kumar
- Production company: Sri Venkateswara Cine Chitra
- Distributed by: Sri Venkateshwara Creations; Reliance Movies
- Release date: 23 April 2010
- Running time: 153 mins
- Country: India
- Language: Telugu
- Budget: ₹23 crore
- Box office: ₹18 crore distributors' share

Darling is a 2010 Indian Telugu-language romantic comedy film directed and written by A. Karunakaran. It is produced by B. V. S. N. Prasad under his studio Sri Venkateswara Cine Chitra. The film stars Prabhas and Kajal Aggarwal. The music is composed by G. V. Prakash Kumar. The film follows Prabha, who, desperate to escape a forced marriage to a gangster's daughter, spins a tale of reuniting with his long-lost love in the idyllic Swiss Alps.

The film was released theatrically on 23 April 2010, to positive reviews from audiences and critics. The film went on to be a commercial success at the box office.The film later was remade in Kannada as Bulbul (2013).

== Plot ==
This movie starts in 1980 when friends celebrate their farewell party. They promise each other to keep in touch. Among them are Hanumanta Rao, who has a son named Prabha, and Vishwanath who has a daughter named Nandini. To reach their professional goals, Vishwanath and Nandini travel to Switzerland, while Hanumanta Rao becomes a criminal lawyer and settles in India. Thus, Prabha and Nandini get separated in their childhood.

Years later, these old friends call for a reunion where a grown-up Prabha, a musician, is eager to see his lover Nandini after many years, but Nisha, the daughter of a local don, attempts suicide when Prabha does not accept her love. Her father tries to kill Prabha and his friends, but Prabha gets out of trouble by faking a story about how him and his band traveled to Switzerland and how he fell in love with Nandini.

During the reunion at Bhadram’s farmhouse, Prabha happens to see Nandini, who is now a graduated gold medalist from Cambridge. He tries various tantrums to impress her, but in vain. His attempts are always thwarted by her brother. One day, he knowingly gives a lead about his sister's favourite game of basketball, forcing Prabha and his team to create a basketball court. As they play basketball, Rishi, Appala Raju's son gatecrashes into the game as he is cheered by Nandini. Both Rishi and Prabha vie with each other to impress Nandini, leading to a cold war between them.

Meanwhile, Bhadram's daughter, Prasanna confesses to Prabha that she was in love with a man and would be able to marry him if she could pay a dowry of 5 million, and she forces Prabha to talk to her father into marrying off her to her boyfriend. Prabha approaches Bhadram as if he found the match for Prasanna himself, where Bhadram then plans to sell his home for the marriage. Tear-struck, Prasanna tries to reject the proposal and Hanumanta Rao comes to inquire. Prabha tells him, and Hanumanta and his friends decide to help in the expenses, stopping Bhadram from selling the house. Nandini begins to show affection to Prabha after that incident. Jealous of Nandini's liking for Prabha, Rishi's friends try to paralyse Prabha by disconnecting the power cable of an iron box. Hanumanta Rao, unaware of their conspiracy, accidentally touches the iron box and gets an electric shock, leading to a scuffle between Prabha and Rishi. The fight results in Hanumanta Rao ejecting Prabha out of the house.

Later, Prabha finds out that Rishi is not Appala Raju's son, but Vishwanath's nephew. Vishwanath married his girlfriend rather than the girl chosen by his father, helped by Hanumanta. As a result, he is ousted by his father. Hanumanta Rao, on Viswanath's behalf, negotiates with his father for a reconciliation. After many attempts, he agrees to forgive Viswanath, but on the condition that his daughter's son should marry Nandini.

Feeling emotional, Prabha promises not to reveal his love for Nandini to save his father's promise and decides to leave. As Prabha tries to leave, Nandini reveals that she was in love with him all along. She was playing hard to get with him, only to know how much he loves her. However, to save his father's promise, he does not reveal his love to her and leaves the place, leaving Nandini heartbroken. Nisha's father too realizes the truth that the story Prabha had said was a lie, and tries to kill him. Meanwhile, Nandini gets to know the truth behind Prabha's silence and injures herself on purpose as she is angry at Hanumanta Rao. She tells Vishwanath that she loves Prabha and she wants to marry him. Feeling bad for her, he agrees to her proposal. Hanumanta Rao reminds him of the condition, but Viswanath says no and reminds him of their friendship for helping each other. Even Viswanath's father feels emotional about it. He tells them how bad he feels and apologises to his son for not being there for him by allowing Nandini to marry Prabha and reconcile's with them.

Outside, Nandini runs to Prabha and sees him getting beaten up by Nisha's father. He sends his men to kill her, but Prabha manages to stop them and save Nandini but was severely injured. Nisha's father later raises a gun at Prabha, but Nandini pleads him to not shoot and shows her love for Prabha. Feeling emotional, Nisha's father lowers the gun and lets them go. Prabha and Nandini finally get married and live a happy life.

== Cast ==
- Prabhas as Prabhas "Prabha"
- Kajal Aggarwal as Nandini
- Prabhu as Hanumanta Rao (Prabha's father)
- Thulasi Shivamani as Rajeswari (Prabha's mother)
- Shraddha Das as Nisha
- Ahuti Prasad as Vishwanath
- Chandra Mohan as Bhadram
- Mukesh Rishi as Nisha's father
- Kota Srinivasa Rao as Vishwanath's father
- M. S. Narayana as Appala Raju and Church Father (Flashback)
- Dharmavarapu Subrahmanyam as Buchchaiah Mama and Booch Thomas (Flashback)
- Vamsi Krishna as Rishi Varma
- Srinivasa Reddy as Prabha's friend
- Prabhas Sreenu as Prabha's friend
- Sivannarayana Naripeddi as Hanumanta Rao's friend
- Narsing Yadav as Mukesh Rishi's henchman
- Russell Geoffrey Banks as Child Kidnapper
- Master Gaurav as Nandini's younger brother
- Shilpa as Prasanna
- Narasimha Raju as Gopal (Prabha's friend)
- Raja Sridhar as Prabha's friend
- Rama Rao as Prabha's friend
- Arun Kumar as Hanumanta Rao's friend
- Gurumukh Singh as Hanumanta Rao's friend
- David Firestar as Civilian
- Alex Martin as Gang Leader
- Madhavi

== Soundtrack ==
Darling

Soundtrack album by G. V. Prakash Kumar
- Released: 8 April 2010
- Recorded: 2010
- Genre: Feature film soundtrack
- Length: 25:56
- Language: Telugu
- Label: Sony Music India
- Producer: G. V. Prakash Kumar

G. V. Prakash Kumar chronology
Madarasapattinam (2010)	Darling (2010)	Va (2010)

The film had its audio release function on 8 April at Cyber Gardens, Hyderabad.

Track listing
No.	Title	Lyrics	Singer(s)	Length
1.	"Hosaahorey"	Ananth Sreeram	K.K., Lesle Lewis	3:53
2.	"Inkaa Edho (Padha Padha Raaraa)"	Ananth Sreeram	Sooraj Santhosh, Prashanthini	5:17
3.	"Neeve"	Ananth Sreeram	G. V. Prakash Kumar	4:46
4.	"Bulley Naa Tingari (Bhalle Bhalle)"	Ananth Sreeram	Mallikarjun, Priya Himesh	4:35
5.	"Praanama"	Ananth Sreeram	Rahul Nambiar	3:31
6.	"Aakaasam Kannaa Paina (Ghum Ghum Yeyo)"	Ananth Sreeram	Benny Dayal & Chorus	3:51
Total length:				25:56

== Reception ==
The film opened to positive reviews. The Times of India gave a two and half star rating explaining "Director A. Karunakaran extracts good performances from his actors, but can't come up with a refreshing plot. It looks like the director hasn't really come out of his Tholi Prema hangover as he dishes out yet another one-sided love saga but fails to come up with a valid and logical reason to make a Gen Z lad to hold back his feelings for his lover until the last moment. However, he compensates it all, by adding loads of fun moments in the film and the screenplay does have its share of some touching moments". Sify noted "Prabhas looked very handsome and his performance can be termed as the major highlight of the film". Rediff felt that the film "is entertaining" and lauded the director for "showcasing clean wholesome family entertainment". Local review sites GreatAndhra and Idlebrain both gave a three star rating and praised the actors performance and technical works of the film.

== Awards and nominations ==
Awards	Category	Nominee	Result	Ref.
Nandi Awards	Best Editor	Kotagiri Venkateswara Rao	Won	
Nandi Awards	Best Male Dubbing Artist	R C M Raju	Won	
58th Filmfare Awards South	Best Actress	Kajal Aggarwal	Nominated	
CineMAA Awards	Best Actor (Jury)	Prabhas	Won	
Santosham Film Awards	Best Cinematographer	Andrew	Won	
Mirchi Music Awards South	Best Playback Singer Male	Sooraj Santhosh	Won	
Mirchi Music Awards South	Technical Award for Sound Mixing	Shantanu Hudlikar for "Neeve" (Note: Also for Ramesh for "Rooba Rooba" in Orange (2010).)	Won	

== Remakes ==
Darling movie was remade in Kannada as Bulbul starring Darshan, Ambareesh, Ramya Barna, Rachita Ram and directed by M.D Shridhar and Produced by Meena Thoogudeepa. It was later dubbed in Hindi under the title Sabse Badhkar Hum.
