= B. V. S. N. Prasad =

Indian film distributor and producer

- Born: Bhogavalli Venkata Sathyanarayana Prasad; Undrajavaram, Andhra Pradesh, India
- Occupation: Producer
- Political party: Jana Sena Party (2023–present)

Bhogavalli Venkata Sathyanarayana Prasad, commonly known as B. V. S. N. Prasad, is an Indian film producer and distributor, primarily known for his work in Telugu cinema. He is the owner of the production companies Sri Venkateswara Cine Chitra (SVCC), formerly known as Sri Krishna Prasanna Enterprises, and SVCC Digital. Prasad has won two Filmfare Awards for his work on Magadheera (2009) and Attarintiki Daredi (2013), and a SIIMA Award for the latter.

== Film career ==
In 1984, Prasad was associated with film distribution alongside, film journalist, Pasupuleti Rama Rao. In 1986, he ventured into film production with Driver Babu, directed by Boyina Subba Rao and starring Sobhan Babu.

== Filmography ==
Year	Title	Language	Ref.
1986	Driver Babu	Telugu	
1987	Makutamleni Maharaju	Telugu	
1988	Chattam Tho Chadarangam	Telugu	
1989	Ontari Poratam	Telugu	
1990	Dagudumuthala Dampathyam	Telugu	
1996	Adirindi Alludu	Telugu	
2003	Ee Abbai Chala Manchodu	Telugu	
2005	Chatrapathi	Telugu	
2006	Khatarnak	Telugu	
2009	Magadheera	Telugu	
2009	Arya 2	Telugu	
2010	Darling	Telugu	
2011	Oosaravelli	Telugu	
2012	Devudu Chesina Manushulu	Telugu	
2013	Ongole Gitta	Telugu	
2013	Sahasam	Telugu	
2013	Attarintiki Daredi	Telugu	
2015	Dohchay	Telugu	
2016	Nannaku Prematho	Telugu	
2016	Intlo Deyyam Nakem Bhayam	Telugu	
2018	Tholi Prema	Telugu	
2019	Mr. Majnu	Telugu	
2020	Solo Brathuke So Better	Telugu	
2021	Ninnila Ninnila	Telugu	
2022	Ranga Ranga Vaibhavanga	Telugu	
2023	Virupaksha	Telugu	
2023	Asvins	Tamil	
2023	Gandeevadhari Arjuna	Telugu	
2024	Star	Tamil	
2024	Appudo Ippudo Eppudo	Telugu	
2025	Jack	Telugu	
2026	Vrushakarma	Telugu	

== Awards ==
- Filmfare Award for Best Film - Telugu - Magadheera (2009)
- Filmfare Award for Best Film - Telugu - Attarintiki Daredi (2013)
- B. Nagi Reddy Memorial Award - Attarintiki Daredi (2013)
- SIIMA Award for Best Film - Telugu - Attarintiki Daredi (2013)
