= Asvins (film) =

2023 Indian film

- Theatrical release poster
- Directed by: Tarun Teja
- Produced by: B. V. S. N. Prasad; Praveen Daniel
- Starring: Vasanth Ravi; Vimala Raman
- Cinematography: A. M. Edwin Sakay
- Edited by: Venkat Raajen
- Music by: Vijay Siddharth
- Production company: Sri Venkateswara Cine Chitra
- Distributed by: Sakthi Film Factory
- Release date: 23 June 2023
- Running time: 110 minutes
- Country: India
- Language: Tamil

Asvins is a 2023 Indian Tamil-language psychological horror film written and directed by Tarun Teja in his directorial debut. The film stars Vasanth Ravi and Vimala Raman with Muralidaran, Saraswathi Menon, Udhaya Deep and Simran Pareek in supporting roles. It is an adaptation of Tarun Teja's own short film of the same name. The film was released theatrically on 23 June 2023 to mixed reviews.

== Plot ==
The movie begins with a flashback depicting a folk tale about a boy being saved by Ashwini Kumars and being given a boon that other than natural causes, he shall not die in any way.

The story then follows a group of people investigating paranormal activity in a mansion in Kent, which formerly belonged to an archaeologist named Aarthi Rajagopalan (Vimala Raman). The group faces an unknown entity in the mansion and hear voices in their heads. Arjun (Vasanth Ravi) must reunite the two idols of Ashwini Kumars to save the rest of his team.

== Cast ==
- Vasanth Ravi as Arjun, Ritu's husband
- Vimala Raman as Aarthi Rajagopalan
- Saraswathi Menon as Rithvika "Ritu" Arjun, Arjun's wife
- Muralidaran as Varun, Rahul's elder brother
- Udhaya Deep as Rahul, Varun's younger brother
- Malina as Grace

== Production ==
The film was produced by B. V. S. N. Prasad under Sri Venkateswara Cine Chitra, while it was co-produced by Praveen Daniel. The cinematography was done by A. M. Edwin Sakay, while editing was handled by Venkat Raajen. The daughter of Rajiv Menon, Saraswathi Menon, made her acting debut in this film.

== Music ==
The music of the film was composed by Vijay Siddharth and assisted by Prashanth Ramesh.

== Release ==
The film was initially scheduled to release in theatres on 9 June 2023, but was postponed to 23 June 2023.

== Reception ==
Gopinath Rajendran of The Hindu wrote, "Despite the shallow story with tried-and-tested tropes, Asvins impresses with its technical aspects and as a scary movie that does justice to its genre." Logesh Balachandran of The Times of India gave the film 2.5 out of 5 stars and wrote, "Asvins is quite interesting in terms of ideas, but the main issue is that they don't come together as a whole." Manigandan K. R. of The South First gave the film 3 out of 5 stars and wrote, "Asvins is a reasonably well-made engaging horror thriller that works, if you have the patience to sit through right till the end."

A critic from Sakshi gave the film a rating of 2.5 stars out of 5 and gave a mixed review. Kiran Kumar Thanjavur of News18 Telugu gave it 2.75 out of 5 stars and called it as "an engaging psychological thriller."
