= Khatarnak (2006 film) =

2006 Indian film by Amma Rajasekhar

- Theatrical release poster
- Directed by: Amma Rajashekhar
- Written by: Amma Rajashekhar; Marudhuri Raja
- Produced by: B. V. S. N. Prasad
- Starring: Ravi Teja; Ileana D'Cruz; Biju Menon; Prakash Raj
- Cinematography: Santosh Srinivas
- Edited by: Kotagiri Venkateswara Rao
- Music by: M. M. Keeravani
- Distributed by: Sri Venkateswara Cine Chitra
- Release date: 14 December 2006
- Running time: 152 minutes
- Country: India
- Language: Telugu

Khatarnak (transl. Dangerous) is a 2006 Indian Telugu-language action comedy film directed by choreographer-turned-director Amma Rajasekhar. The film stars Ravi Teja, Biju Menon and Ileana D'Cruz play the lead roles. B. V. S. N. Prasad has produced this film. The film was released on 13 December 2006 and was a box office failure. The film is inspired by the Korean film Mr. Socrates (2005).

== Plot ==
Dasu (Ravi Teja) is the son of a counterfeit racketeer (Kota Srinivasa Rao). As his father goes to jail, Dasu becomes an orphan. He stops his education at 10th class and moves like a vagabond. On the other side, a smuggler used to smuggle drugs and arms into the country. But an honest police officer (Prakash Raj) hatches a plan and sends an informer Venu (Raja Ravindra) into their underworld. He stays with them for some time and passes on information to the police, with the help of which the police can bust the smugglers' team, though not the kingpin. The don's assistant, who was also a lawyer advises him to play the same trick and admit one of their henchmen into the police to get information from the reverse side. However, he should not be in police records but should be crooked and cunning. The smugglers' team's search ends with Dasu. The group threatens Dasu and makes him play like a puppet in their hands. To push him inside the police department, he should at least pass the tenth class. So, they admit him to a school, where he falls in love with a teacher Nakshatra (Ileana D'Cruz). However, she doesn't like him as he neither has good education nor good looks. After a few incidents, the don's right hand i.e., the lawyer tells Dasu to study well and become a police officer to win her love. Admitting the idea, Dasu turns into a good student and gets through the exam. Later, he becomes a constable and gets posted in traffic. The smugglers' unit hatches another plan and succeeds in pushing him into the crime police. After watching Dasu as a sincere police constable, Nakshatra too starts liking him. Soon, in a turn of events, Venu who was Nakshatra's brother is killed at the hands of Dasu at the behest of the don. She chides Dasu and starts hating him. Dasu starts disliking his job since he became a police officer only to win her love. As he lost her love, Dasu turns against the don and finally kills him. Nakshatra learns from the lawyer that her brother died at the hands of the don, she reunites with Dasu and the film ends on a happy note.

== Cast ==
- Ravi Teja as Dasu
- Ileana D'Cruz as Nakshatra
- Biju Menon as Lawyer
- Prakash Raj as Commissioner of Police
- Kota Srinivasa Rao as Dasu's father
- Ali as Sathi Pandu
- Venu Madhav as Puli
- Lal as the smuggler
- Brahmanandam as Phillips
- Suman Setty as Student
- MS Narayana as Traffic Police officer
- Raghu Babu as Escaped Prisoner
- Bharath Reddy as Lawyer's assistant
- Uttej as Police Constable
- Raja Ravindra as Venu, Police informer and Nakshatra's brother
- Dharmavarapu Subramanyam as School principal
- Madhusudhan Rao as MLA
- Shravan as Lawyer's assistant
- Uma Devi as teacher
- Jenny as G. Dass, magistrate
- Ankitha (special appearance in the song "Maatante Maateraa")

== Music ==
Khatarnak

Soundtrack album by M. M. Keeravani
- Released: 14 November 2006
- Recorded: 2006
- Genre: Feature film soundtrack
- Language: Telugu
- Label: Aditya Music
- Producer: M. M. Keeravani

M. M. Keeravani chronology
Amma Cheppindi (2006)	Khatarnak (2006)	Yamadonga (2007)

The music of the film released on 14 November 2006 statewide. The film has six songs composed by M. M. Keeravani. The song "Aa Gaganamlo" has tunes borrowed from the song "The Next Episode" by American rapper Dr. Dre. The song "Doma Kudithe Chicken Huniya" was based on the song "Aa Mudhal Akku" composed by Srikanth Deva for the Tamil movie Jithan.

No.	Title	Lyrics	Singer(s)	Length
1.	"Aa Gaganamlo"	Chandrabose	Geetha Madhuri, Nani, Noyel
2.	"Bujji Bujji Papa"	Jonnavittula Ramalingeswara Rao	Gayatri R., Noyel, Shankar Mahadevan
3.	"Doma Kudithe Chikungunya"	Chandrabose	Shankar Mahadevan, Chithra	5.06
4.	"Love Chese Vallaki"	Bhasha Sree	Ulaganathan, Venu Madhav
5.	"Maatante Maateraa"	Chandrabose	Tippu
6.	"Vestaavaa"	Shiva Shakthi Datta	Shankar Mahadevan, Chithra

== Reception ==
Rediff.com critic G P Aditya Vardhan rated the film 1.5/5 and criticized the film for poor writing and direction. "The music by Keeravani is pathetic. So are the dance numbers. The double entendre and the bizarre stunts hurt. Only a miracle can save this film," he wrote. Alluru Rahim of Zamin Ryot gave also a negative review for the film. Jeevi of Idlebrain.com wrote that "Director Amma Rajasekhar could not do the execution right". A critic from Sify wrote, "Choreographer Amma Rajashekar who made successful debut as director with Ranam has directed this. Confused story, jaded screenplay with too many mass elements, boring songs- all mar the tempo".
