= Manjari (Norwegian singer) =

Norwegian singer

Manjari is the stage name of the Norwegian singer Trude Trefall.

She is known for the song "Lys", which came in 2nd place in the Norwegian national final for the 1997 Eurovision Song Contest.
