= Driver Babu =

1986 Telugu film starring Sobhan Babu

- Directed by: Boyina Subba Rao
- Screenplay by: Boyina Subba Rao
- Based on: Khud-daar
- Produced by: B. V. S. N. Prasad
- Starring: Sobhan Babu; Radha
- Cinematography: V. Suresh
- Edited by: Kotagiri Venkateswara Rao
- Music by: K. Chakravarthy
- Production company: Sri Krishna Prasanna Enterprises
- Release date: 14 January 1986
- Running time: 144 minutes
- Country: India
- Language: Telugu

Driver Babu is a 1986 Indian Telugu language action drama film directed by Boyina Subba Rao starring Sobhan Babu and Radha. A remake of the Hindi film, Khud-daar, it emerged as a critical and commercial success.

== Cast ==
- Sobhan Babu as Raja aka Driver Babu
- Radha as Gowri
- Kaikala Satyanarayana as Madhava Rao
- Tulasi as Radha
- Rajya Lakshmi as Chandini
- Pramila
- Ponni
- Gummadi as Narayana Rao
- Rajesh as Ravi
- Prabhakar Reddy as Keshava Rao
- P. L. Narayana as Raheem Chacha
- Veerabhadra Rao as Dakshinamurthy
- Raja Varma
- Gokina Rama Rao as Public Prosecutor
- Bheema Raju
- K. K. Sharma
- Senthil as Stage Drama Artiste

== Soundtrack ==
Soundtrack was composed by K. Chakravarthy.

- "Nunnaga" - S. P. Balasubrahmanyam, P. Susheela
- "Mundepu" - S. P. Balasubrahmanyam, P. Susheela
- "Oosoci" - S. P. Balasubrahmanyam
- "Yelomaanu" - P Susheela
- "Mudduku" - S. P. Balasubrahmanyam, S.P. Sailaja
