= Mark Roberts Motion Control =

Mark Roberts Motion Control designs and manufactures motion control equipment (robotic camera rigs) for both the TV and Film industry. The company, based in Sussex in the UK, received an Academy Award in 1999 for its contribution to the special effects industry in feature films. The company was sold to Nikon Corporation in September 2017 and later acquired by Multidyne Video & Fiber Optic Systems in June 2026.

The Bolt High-Speed Cinebot Robot is a 6-axis robotic arm used to capture high-speed camera movements. The rig can be combined with track (3 metres each in length) creating a 7 axis of motion. In January 2018, the company launched "Junior", a more compact and more affordable version of its larger scale Bolt cinebot, which is marketed as "the fastest high-speed camera robot in the world."

The company was established in 1966 when Australian born engineer, inventor and part-time racing driver, Mark Roberts, set up a company to service and upgrade old animation rostrum tables that were used in everything from film titles, cell animation and news clips.

In 2017, Mark Roberts Motion Control was presented with the Queen's Award for Enterprise for International Trade by Prince Richard, Duke of Gloucester.

== Recent feature films that used Mark Roberts Motion Control Equipment ==
- 4.3.2.1
- 47 Ronin
- A Nightmare on Elm Street
- Aftershock
- Clash of the Titans
- Dredd
- Gulliver's Travels
- Harry Potter and the Deathly Hallows – Part 1
- Harry Potter and the Deathly Hallows – Part 2
- Hugo
- Jack the Giant Killer
- Jackboots on Whitehall
- John Carter of Mars
- Kick Ass
- Life of Pi
- Nanny McPhee and the Big Bang
- Prince of Persia: The Sands of Time
- Prometheus
- Rise of the Planet of the Apes
- Sherlock Holmes: A Game of Shadows
- Snow White and the Huntsman
- Star Wars: The Rise of Skywalker
- Sucker Punch
- The A-Team
- The Chronicles of Narnia: The Voyage of the Dawn Treader
- The Flying Machine
- The Muppets
- The Pirates! In an Adventure with Scientists!
- The Sandman and the Lost Sand of Dreams
- The Wolfman
- This Means War
- Tron: Legacy
- Upside Down
- X-Men: First Class

== Past feature films that used Mark Roberts Motion Control Equipment ==
- 1408
- 2012
- 102 Dalmatians
- 99 Francs
- A Knight's Tale
- Across the Universe
- Alexander
- Amazing Grace
- Anaconda
- Angels & Demons
- Asterix & Obelix: Mission Cleopatra
- Avatar
- Babe: Pig in the City
- Batman Begins
- Below
- Black Hawk Down
- Blade
- Blood and Chocolate
- Braveheart
- Bridget Jones: The Edge of Reason
- Brotherhood of the Wolf
- Casino Royale
- Charlie and the Chocolate Factory
- Chicago
- Chicken Run
- Children of Men
- City of Ember
- Dante's Peak
- Dawn of the Dead
- De-Lovely
- Die Another Day
- Dr. Dolittle
- Dr. Dolittle 2
- Dreamcatcher
- Driven
- Ella Enchanted
- Enemy at the Gates
- Enemy of the State
- Entrapment
- Eragon
- EuroTrip
- Existenz
- Extreme Ops
- Face/Off
- Father's Affair
- Fear and Loathing in Las Vegas
- Finding Neverland
- Five Children and It
- Flushed Away
- Fred Claus
- Fur - An Imaginary Portrait of Diane Arbus
- Ghost Ship
- Gladiator
- Hannibal
- Harry Potter and the Chamber of Secrets
- Harry Potter and the Goblet of Fire
- Harry Potter and the Half-Blood Prince
- Harry Potter and the Order of the Phoenix
- Harry Potter and the Philosopher's Stone
- Harry Potter and the Prisoner of Azkaban
- Hellboy II: The Golden Army
- Herbie: Fully Loaded
- I, Robot
- Inspector Gadget
- Jericho Mansions
- Jumper
- K-19: The Widowmaker
- King Arthur
- Lara Croft Tomb Raider: The Cradle of Life
- Lara Croft: Tomb Raider
- Little Buddha
- Little Nicky
- Lost in Space
- Max Payne
- Mimic
- Minority Report
- Mission: Impossible 2
- Mission: Impossible III
- Moon
- Mortal Kombat Annihilation
- Moulin Rouge!
- My Favorite Martian
- Napoleon
- New York Minute
- Nowhere Boy
- Paycheck
- Penelope
- Peut-être
- Pitch Black
- Planet of the Apes
- Pluto Nash
- Quantum of Solace
- Resident Evil: Extinction
- S.W.A.T.
- S1m0ne
- Sahara
- Saving Private Ryan
- Scooby-Doo
- Secret Window
- Sherlock Holmes
- Six Days Seven Nights
- Sky High
- Sleepy Hollow
- Spider-Man
- Spider-Man 2
- Spider-Man 3
- Star Trek Generations
- Star Trek: Insurrection
- Stardust
- Stuart Little
- Stuart Little 2
- Sunshine
- Superman Returns
- Sweeney Todd: The Demon Barber of Fleet Street
- Terminator 3: Rise of the Machines
- The Alamo
- The Avengers
- The Aviator
- The Big Lebowski
- The Blind Side
- The Bone Collector
- The Borrowers
- The Break-Up
- The Brothers Grimm
- The Bucket List
- The Chronicles of Narnia: Prince Caspian
- The Count of Monte Cristo
- The Da Vinci Code
- The Dark Knight
- The Discovery of Heaven
- The Fountain
- The Golden Compass
- The Haunted Mansion
- The Hitchhiker's Guide to the Galaxy
- The Imaginarium of Doctor Parnassus
- The Importance of Being Earnest
- The Incredible Hulk
- The International
- The Last Shot
- The League of Extraordinary Gentlemen
- The Legend of 1900
- The Life Aquatic with Steve Zissou
- The Matrix Reloaded
- The Matrix Revolutions
- The Mummy
- The Mummy Returns
- The Ninth Gate
- The Others
- The Phantom of the Opera
- The Prince and Me
- The Pursuit of Happyness
- The Visitor
- The World Is Not Enough
- The X-Files
- The Young Victoria
- The Time Traveler's Wife
- Two Brothers
- V for Vendetta
- Vajont - La diga del disonore
- Veronica Guerin
- Wallace & Gromit: The Curse of the Were-Rabbit
- Wimbledon
- You Don't Mess with the Zohan
