= Adirindi Alludu =

- Directed by: E. V. V. Satyanarayana
- Written by: Isukapalli Mohanrao; Marudhuri Raja
- Story by: K. Bhagyaraj
- Based on: Idhu Namma Aalu (1988)
- Produced by: B. V. S. N. Prasad
- Starring: Mohan Babu; Ramya Krishna; Gauthami
- Cinematography: V. S. R. Swamy
- Edited by: Kotagiri Venkateswara Rao
- Music by: M. M. Keeravani
- Release date: 10 July 1996
- Country: India
- Language: Telugu

Adirindi Alludu (transl. Superb, son-in-law!) is a 1996 Telugu-language film directed by E. V. V. Satyanarayana. The film stars Mohan Babu and Ramya Krishna in the lead roles. The film is a remake of 1988 Tamil film Idhu Namma Aalu.

== Plot ==
Chandram is a poor graduate whose family struggles to make a living. He leaves home to find work to pay for his mother's eye surgery.

== Cast ==
- Mohan Babu as Chandram
- Ramya Krishnan as Lakshmi
- J. V. Somayajulu as Parameswara Sastri, Lakshmi's father
- Brahmanandam
- Annapurna as Chandram's mother
- Kota Srinivasa Rao as Chandram's father
- Ananth
- Jenny

== Soundtrack ==
- "Andagathera Mundukochera" - M. M. Srilekha, S. P. Balasubrahmanyam
- "Adirindi Naku Intalluda" - K. S. Chithra, S. P. Balasubrahmanyam
- "Adivo Alladivo" - K. S. Chithra, S. P. Balasubrahmanyam
- "Ade Marade Allade" - S. P. Balasubrahmanyam, K. S. Chithra
- "Pelli Gilli Aypoyaka" - Mano, K. S. Chithra
- "Muddante Mojupadi" - Mano, Sujatha Mohan

== Reception ==
Griddaluru Gopalrao of Zamin Ryot wrote that there is no need to make films that show a certain case brutally. He concluded that it is not right to make films with such a cruel and deceitful story and that the film has a mix of fights and romance is essential for the film to be profitable.
