= Manjari Budruk railway station =

Railway Station in Maharashtra, India

Manjari railway station

General information
- Location: Manjri Village Rd, Manjri Budruk, Pune; India
- Coordinates: 18.5124°N 73.9718°E
- Elevation: 550.00 m (1,804 ft)
- System: Indian Railways station
- Owner: Indian Railways
- Lines: Dadar–Solapur section Mumbai–Chennai line
- Platforms: 2
- Tracks: 4
- Connections: Auto stand

Construction
- Parking: No
- Cycle facilities: No

Other information
- Station code: MJBK
- Fare zone: Central Railway
Location
- Location within India Location within Maharashtra

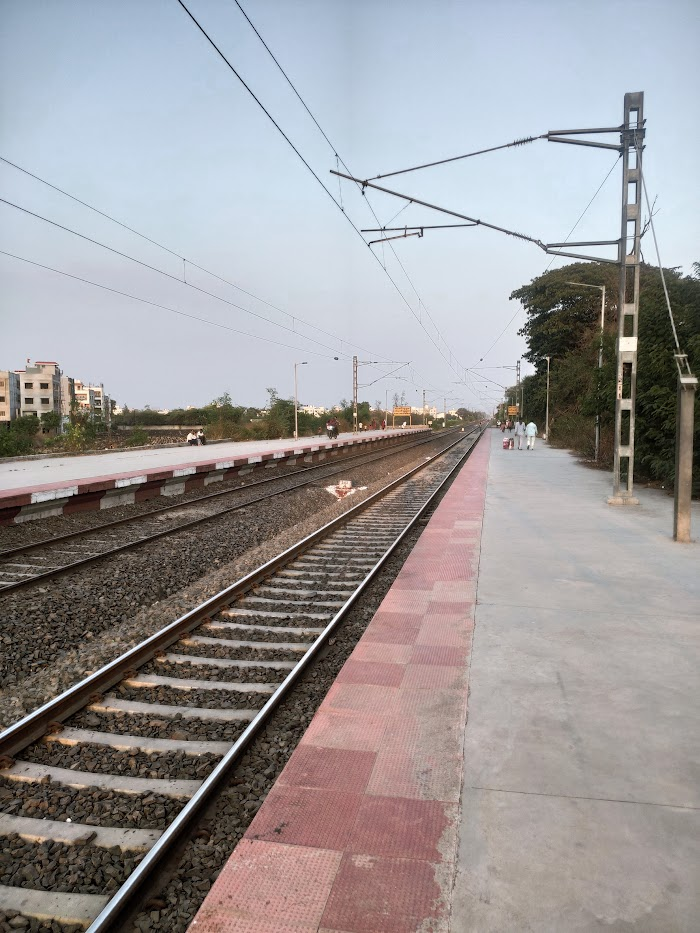
Manjari railway station in the evening

Manjari railway station is located in the Indian city of Pune. It serves Manjari, a suburban area of the city. There are plans to start long-distance trains from this station as there is no space for new trains at Pune Junction. There is also a plan to start suburban trains on Pune–Daund section. This station will be a major station for Pune–Daund suburban trains. The station consists of two platforms, neither well sheltered. It lacks many facilities including water and sanitation.

== Trains ==
Trains passing through Manjari include:

- Pune–Baramati Passenger
- Pune–Baramati–Daund–Pune Passenger
- Pune–Daund Passenger
- Pune–Daund Passenger
- Pune–Daund Fast Passenger
- Pune–Manmad Passenger
- Pune–Nizamabad Passenger
- Pune–Solapur Passenger
- Pune–Solapur Passenger

== See also ==
- Pune Junction
- Shivaji Nagar
- Khadki
- Pune Suburban Railway
