= Ee Abbai Chala Manchodu =

- Poster
- Directed by: Agathiyan
- Screenplay by: Agathiyan
- Story by: Agathiyan
- Produced by: B. V. S. N. Prasad
- Starring: Ravi Teja; Vani; Sangeetha
- Cinematography: Rajesh Yadav
- Edited by: Venkateswara Rao Kotagiri
- Music by: M. M. Keeravani
- Production company: Sri Venkateswara Cine Chitra
- Release date: 14 January 2003
- Country: India
- Language: Telugu

Ee Abbai Chala Manchodu (transl. This boy is very good) is a 2003 Telugu-language romantic comedy film directed by Agastyan and produced by B. V. S. N. Prasad. The film stars Ravi Teja, Sangeetha and Vani.

== Plot ==
Vivekananda (Ravi Teja) is the son of a rich businessman (Ajay Rathnam). He falls in love with a middle-class girl Bharathi (Vani). His father believes love means sharing worldly pleasures with a female and advises him to have carnal pleasure with his lover, but Vivekananda believes love is pristine and sacred and does not involve sex. Bharathi's mother (Shanoor Sana), however, does not support their love as she believes that every woman should be domineering and keep her husband in control, and as Vivekananda is rich, she believes he will not let himself be dominated. Both decide to prove their parents wrong and leave their respective homes to live together without having sex. The rest of the story is how they prove their parents wrong and win their approval.

== Cast ==
- Ravi Teja as Vivekananda
- Vani as Bharathi
- Sangeetha as Jeevitha
- Ajay Rathnam as Vivekananda's father
- Preeti Nigam as Vivekananda's stepmother
- Shanoor Sana as Bharathi's mother
- Banerjee as Bharathi's father
- Vidya Vathi as Vivekananda's sister

== Music ==
Ee Abbai Chala Manchodu

Soundtrack album by M. M. Keeravani
- Released: 2003
- Genre: Feature film soundtrack
- Length: 40:21
- Language: Telugu
- Label: TeluguOne; Aditya Music

M. M. Keeravani chronology
Evare Athagadu (2003)	Ee Abbai Chala Manchodu (2003)	Jism (2003)

The music of the film was composed by M. M. Keeravani.

No.	Song	Singers
1	"Oh Sari"	K. S. Chithra, S. P. Balasubrahmanyam
2	"Chandamaama"	Kalyani Malik, Sunitha
3	"Oka Manasunu"	M. M. Keeravani, Ganga
4	"Navamallika"	Smitha
5	"Chadavadaniki"	S. P. Balasubrahmanyam
6	"Kanipinchavamma"	S. P. B. Charan
7	"Thillana"	Kalpana Raghavendar
8	"Vidduram"	M. M. Keeravani

== Reception ==
Idlebrain wrote "First half of the film is good. Second half has serious shades to it. The director, overall, did a good job, but ignored commercial elements in the second half. There is no comedy and too many philosophical dialogues in the second half". Full Hyderabad wrote "The first half of the movie trots along merrily with some easy scenes. As a precious son advising his Dad on business and love, Vivek looks charming and even believable. But after the young couple decides to pad together in a tiny tenement and live together, the movie starts getting into that contrived mode. [..] Towards the last one hour, the movie completely loses track and leaves us frustrated. That the director himself had no idea how to drag the movie is obvious from unnecessary insertions like the plane hijack where Vivek and Jeevita are kidnapped". Telugu Cinema wrote "Recently we saw lot of films those run by the taking of director without a great story line. But this film had good Direction, Screenplay, Characterization, and commendable performance by the Hero. Though this film has very less chances to attract the audience just because of its weak story line in second half".
