= Manjari, Belgaum =

Manjari मंजरी
- Village
- Interactive map of Manjari
- Coordinates: 16°33′34.558″N 74°41′23.951″E
- Country: India
- State: Karnataka
- Division: Belgaum
- Tehsil: Chikodi

Population
  - Total: 8,613
- Time zone: UTC+5:30 (IST)
- Postal code: 591213

Manjari is a village located in Chikodi Tehsil of Belgaum district in Karnataka, India. It is located 20 km (12 mi) away from sub-district headquarters Chikodi, the nearest town, and 100 km (62 mi) away from district headquarter Belgaum. As per 2009 stats, Manjari village is also a gram panchayat. The total geographical area of village is 555.71 hectares (1,373.2 acres). Manjari has a total population of 8,613 peoples. There are about 1,844 houses in Manjari village.
