= Oosaravelli =

2011 film by Surender Reddy

- Film poster
- Directed by: Surender Reddy
- Screenplay by: Surender Reddy: Koratala Siva (dialogues)
- Story by: Vakkantham Vamsi
- Produced by: B. V. S. N. Prasad
- Starring: N. T. Rama Rao Jr; Tamannaah Bhatia
- Cinematography: Rasool Ellore
- Edited by: Gautham Raju
- Music by: Devi Sri Prasad
- Production company: Sri Venkateswara Cine Chitra
- Distributed by: Sri Venkateswara Cine Chitra; R R Movie Makers
- Release date: 6 October 2011
- Running time: 162 minutes
- Country: India
- Language: Telugu
- Budget: ₹25 crore
- Box office: ₹57 crore

Oosaravelli (transl. Chameleon) is a 2011 Indian Telugu-language action comedy thriller film directed by Surender Reddy and produced by B. V. S. N. Prasad under Sri Venkateswara Cine Chitra. It stars N. T. Rama Rao Jr, Tamannaah Bhatia, Prakash Raj and Vidyut Jammwal. The score and soundtrack for the film were composed by Devi Sri Prasad, whilst the cinematography was handled by Rasool Ellore and editing by Gautham Raju.

The plot follows Tony (N. T. Rama Rao Jr), a merciless hitman, who falls for Niharika after saving her during a Kashmir terror attack. Discovering she’s engaged to an arms dealer, Tony wages a brutal war against Hyderabad’s underworld to protect her, unaware her forgotten past holds the key to his redemption.

Oosaravelli was released worldwide on 6 October 2011 and received mixed reviews from critics. Despite the reception, the film earned ₹15.75 crore on its first day, setting a record for the biggest opening day in Telugu cinema history at the time of its release. During its full theatrical run, the film grossed ₹57 crore and was a commercial success. It was later remade in Bengali as Rocky in 2013.

== Plot ==
Tony is a self-employed hitman who will do anything for money. He meets Niharika during a terror attack on his way to Kashmir by bus. They both manage to escape, with Tony falling head over heels in love with her, but she leaves to Hyderabad without getting to know about Tony's feelings. Niharika is living with her friend, Chitra, when Tony finds her and arrives to tell her that he loves her and thought she loved him when they escaped from Kashmir.

Niharika tells him that she is already engaged to Rakesh, the son of a Minister in the city, and is soon going to marry him. However, Niharika is unaware that Rakesh, along with his father, are actually arms smugglers. Rakesh asks Tony to meet him, but Tony calls Niharika and tells her to hide and hear their conversation. Niharika overhears Rakesh saying that if Niharika does not marry him, he will kill her and whoever she marries or falls in love with. Niharika learns about Rakesh's true identity and leaves him.

She also realises that she is in love with Tony and calls him, but is unaware of Tony's real profession. Tony is kidnapped by Rakesh and Irfan Bhai, who is the younger brother of a Dubai-based gangster, Ajju Bhai. He kills Irfan, Rakesh and his father, thus making him a target of Ajju Bhai's gang and the Hyderabad police. When Tony, Niharika, and Chitra leave to attend religious services held in a temple, Chitra witnesses Tony killing the DCP, Vikram Sinha, who is the investigating officer of Tony's killings. Tony reveals to Chitra her history; about how he actually knew her, before he rescued her in Kashmir.

Past: Tony's father was a gangster in Mumbai, where on his deathbed, he asked Tony to reform from their old ways and do something good, which people will remember long after their deaths. He also divulges that Niharika's elder brother, Surya, was an undercover cop in Ajju Bhai's gang, and his superior officer was Vikram Sinha, who had double-crossed Surya by revealing his real identity to Ajju Bhai. Ajju had him and his family killed, including Niharika. Surya was called a traitor in the news channels. Niharika was the lone survivor of the assassination on her family, but had a bullet lodged in her head. Due to the location of that bullet in her brain, she began to lose her memory. Tony learnt about her injustice when he first met Niharika, who pleaded with him to take everything, including her self-respect. Tony promised her then that Surya's death will be avenged and he will be proved an innocent person. Niharika recognises one person and loses her memory.

Present: Tony requests Chitra not to reveal Niharika about her past, who realizes that Tony is doing the right thing. Ajju Bhai finds out that Niharika survived the attack and mortally wounds Chitra, mistaking her for Niharika, when she does not divulge about Tony's identity; he frames Tony for her death. Tony finds out the location of Ajju Bhai and his men, and attacks them. Niharika suddenly arrives, where she reveals to Tony that Ajju Bhai killed Chitra and asks him to avenge Chitra's death. Before dying, Chitra revealed to Niharika that Ajju Bhai shot her and her past. Tony reveals to Ajju Bhai about Niharika's family and her identity to Ajju Bhai, before he kills him. In the end, Tony proves Surya's identity as a cop to the world and his innocence. A few days later, he reunites with Niharika, who does not remember any of the recent events. The films ends with Tony stating that he will always love and protect her, threatening to kill those who try to bring her harm.

== Cast ==
- N. T. Rama Rao Jr as Tony/Oosaravelli
- Tamannaah Bhatia as Niharika
- Prakash Raj as Ajju Bhai
- Tanikella Bharani as Rakesh's father
- Vidyut Jammwal as Irfan Bhai, Ajju's younger brother
- Adhvik Mahajan as Rakesh, Niharika's fiancée
- Sayaji Shinde as Tony's father
- Murali Sharma as a local don
- Jaya Prakash Reddy as Jaya "JP" Prada aka Sarkar
- Payal Ghosh as Chitra
- Shaam as Surya, Niharika's brother
- Rahman as DCP Vikram Sinha
- Raghu Babu as Shiva
- Duvvasi Mohan as Satthi
- Sriman as Johnny, JP's sidekick
- Sai as DSP Shiv JR
- Banerjee
- G. V. Sudhakar Naidu as Don
- Prabhas Sreenu as Tony's friend
- Raghu Karumanchi as JP's henchmen
- Sivannarayana Naripeddi as Temple Priest
- Chakravarthy Ramachandra as Tony's friend
- Amit Tiwari as Ajju Bhai's henchman
- Ajay
- Venu Madhav
- M. S. Narayana
- Ahuti Prasad

== Production ==
The production of the film began on 3 March 2011 at Gandipet. The film was shot in Hyderabad, Switzerland, Bangkok, Pattaya, Italy and France.

== Music ==
Oosaravelli

Soundtrack album by Devi Sri Prasad
- Released: 15 September 2011
- Recorded: 2011
- Genre: Feature film soundtrack
- Length: 33:56
- Label: Aditya Music
- Producer: Devi Sri Prasad

Devi Sri Prasad chronology
Dhada (2011)	Oosaravelli (2011)	Gabbar Singh (2012)

The soundtrack of the film was released worldwide on 15 September 2011. K. Raghavendra Rao graced the audio function, unveiling both the CDs and 2 GB memory cards. M. M. Keeravani received the first CD, while S. S. Rajamouli received the first memory card. Other prominent guests in the function were D. Suresh Babu, Boyapati Srinu, Kodali Nani, Nallamalupu Bujji, Vallabhaneni Vamsi Mohan, B. V. S. N. Prasad, Dil Raju, Vamshi Paidipally, Surender Reddy, N. T. Rama Rao Jr, Tamannaah Bhatia, Ganesh Babu, K. L. Narayana, Devi Sri Prasad, Allu Sirish, Lakshman, Gangaraju Gunnam, Ramajogayya Sastry, Anantha Sriram, B. Bapineedu, Gautam Raju, K. S. Rama Rao, K. Atchi Reddy, Suresh Reddy, Koratala Siva, Rasool Yellora, Vakkantham Vamsi and others. The music was composed by Devi Sri Prasad. The song "Dandiya India" was reused by Devi Sri Prasad from "Pudikale Pudikadhu" song, from Tamil movie Venghai (also 2011), starring Dhanush, Tamannaah.

The audio launch event took place at Shilpakala Vedika and was broadcast live on MAA TV.

No.	Title	Lyrics	Singer(s)	Length
1.	"Brathakali"	Chandrabose	Devi Sri Prasad	4:57
2.	"Nenante Naaku"	Ramajogayya Sastry	Adnan Sami	4:26
3.	"Yelango Yelango"	Ramajogayya Sastry	Jaspreet Jasz, Chinmayi Sripaada	4:27
4.	"Love Ante Caring"	Anantha Sriram	Francois Castellino	3:55
5.	"Sri Anjaneyam"	Sirivennela Seetharama Sastry	M. L. R. Karthikeyan, N. T. Rama Rao Jr	5:12
6.	"Niharika"	Anantha Sriram	Vijay Prakash, Neha Bhasin	4:21
7.	"Dandiya India"	Anantha Sreeram	Mukesh Mohamed, Suchitra	4:49
8.	"Oosaravelli (Theme Song)"	Ramajogayya Sastry	Ujjayinee	1:49
Total length:				33:56

=== Album reception ===
Milliblog stated the album as a "Thoroughly enjoyable soundtrack by Devi!"

== Release ==
Oosaravelli premiered in 1800 screens worldwide on 6 October 2011. In the Nizam area of Andhra Pradesh, 200 theatres, including 76 in Hyderabad, screened the film. In the overseas market, the film was released in 91 theatres across the USA.

=== Home media ===
Gemini TV secured the satellite rights for a sum of ₹ 5.50 crore. The DVD was Released by Bhavani Videos on 14 January 2012 with a Purchase price of $7.99 in NTSC Video Format and Dolby Digital 5.1 Audio Format. The Blu-ray was Released on 1 February 2012 with a Purchase price of $14.99 in NTSC Video Format and DTS HD Master, 5.1 Surround Sound.

== Reception ==
=== Critical response ===
Oosaravelli received mixed reviews from critics.

A critic from The Times of India, which gave a two star, said "screenplay falls short, especially in the second half of the film. NTR steals the show in the first half. In most scenes, he underplays his emotions and manages to evoke some laughs. But towards the end of the movie, his act gets inconsistent and he doesn't emote too well either. Tamannah and Payal Ghosh do justice to their roles. A critic from CNN-IBN gave a negative review commenting "Oosaravelli fails to live up to the expectations, and one can blame a weak script for this debacle. The movie is a disappointment for ardent NTR fans but for average viewers it is nothing more than a predictable hotchpotch film". A critic from Rediff.com gave a two and half stars explaining "Oosaravelli is a routine revenge drama. There is some humour woven in, and there are some interesting twists and turns and some flashback episodes. Even so, the director does not seem to have a proper grip on the story. Post-interval, the momentum slackens. NTR is different in terms of his styling and acting. On the whole, it seems like watching a new, more restrained NTR. Tamannaah turns in a good performance.

B.V.S. Prakash of Deccan Chronicle wrote, "A street-smart goon, played by NTR, goes on a killing free terminating ruthless people in an effort to fulfil a promise he made to a hapless girl played by Tammanah. Instead of making a regular vigilante movie, director Surender Reddy blends romance with humour to lessen the gory part of this entertainer, but once the “secret” behind the killings is revealed, the film loses its sheen". A critic from NDTV stated "With Oosaravelli, director Surender Reddy has tried something new and different. If you are a hardcore NTR fan, then it is a must-watch otherwise the film is an average entertainer".

=== Box office ===
Oosaravelli earned ₹15.75 crore on its first day, setting the record for biggest opening day for a Telugu movie at that time. The film's lifetime gross was ₹57 crore with a distributor's share of ₹27.6 crore, becoming Jr.NTR's third highest-grossing film at that time and the third highest-grossing Telugu film of 2011. It was very successful for its makers and an above average success for its distributors.
