= List of awards and nominations received by Naga Chaitanya =

Naga Chaitanya awards and nominations
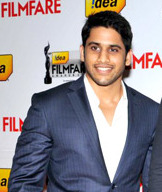
- Chaitanya at the 60th Filmfare Awards South in 2013
Awards and nominations
Award	Wins	Nominations
Nandi Awards	1	1
Filmfare Awards South	1	4
South Indian International Movie Awards	1	5
CineMAA Awards	1	2
Santosham Film Awards	1	1
South Scope Cinema Awards	1	1
Telangana Gaddar Film Awards	1	1
TSR – TV9 National Film Awards	2	2

Totals (Note: Certain award groups do not simply award one winner. They acknowledge several different recipients, have runners-up, and have third place. Since this is a specific recognition and is different from losing an award, runner-up mentions are considered wins in this award tally. For simplification and to avoid errors, each award in this list has been presumed to have had a prior nomination.)
- Wins: 11
- Nominations: 22

Akkineni Naga Chaitanya is an Indian actor who works in Telugu cinema. Chaitanya is a recipient of several accolades including one Filmfare Award South, one Nandi Award, one Telangana Gaddar Film Award and two SIIMA Awards.

== CineMAA Awards ==
Chaitanya has won one CineMAA Awards from two nominations.

Year	Category	Film	Result	Ref.
2010	Best Male Debut	Josh	Won	
2011	Best Actor – Male	Ye Maaya Chesave	Nominated	

== Filmfare Awards South ==
Chaitanya has won one Filmfare Awards South from four nominations.

Year	Category	Film	Result	Ref.
2010	Best Male Debut – South	Josh	Won	
2011	Best Actor – Telugu	Ye Maaya Chesave	Nominated	
2017	Best Actor – Telugu	Premam	Nominated	
2022	Best Actor – Telugu	Love Story	Nominated	

== Hyderabad Times Film Awards ==
Chaitanya has received one Hyderabad Times Film Awards nomination.

Year	Category	Film	Result	Ref.
2012	Best Actor – Male	100% Love	Nominated	

== Indian National Cine Academy Awards ==
Chaitanya has received one Indian National Cine Academy Award.

Year	Category	Film	Result	Ref.
2026	Best Actor – Telugu	Thandel	Won	

== Nandi Awards ==
Chaitanya has won one Nandi Awards.

Year	Category	Film	Result	Ref.
2014	Best Supporting Actor	Manam	Won	

== Nickelodeon Kids' Choice Awards India ==
Chaitanya has received one Nickelodeon Kids' Choice Awards India nomination.

Year	Category	Film	Result	Ref.
2022	Favourite Movie Actor – South	Love Story	Nominated	

== Santosham Film Awards ==
Chaitanya has won one Santosham Film Awards.

Year	Category	Film	Result	Ref.
2017	Best Actor	Premam	Won	

== South Indian International Movie Awards ==
Chaitanya has won two South Indian International Movie Awards from five nominations.

Year	Category	Film	Result	Ref.
2012	Best Actor – Telugu	100% Love	Nominated	
2015	Best Actor – Telugu	Manam	Nominated	
2015	Best Actor Critics – Telugu	Manam	Won	
2021	Best Actor – Telugu	Majili	Nominated	
2022	Best Actor – Telugu	Love Story	Nominated	
2026	Best Actor – Telugu	Thandel	Won	

== South Scope Cinema Awards ==
Chaitanya has won one South Scope Cinema Awards.

Year	Category	Film	Result	Ref.
2011	Rising Star of South Cinema	Ye Maaya Chesave	Won	

== Telangana Gaddar Film Awards ==
Chaitanya has won one Telangana Gaddar Film Awards.

Year	Category	Film	Result	Ref.
2026	Best Actor	Thandel	Won	

== TSR – TV9 National Film Awards ==
Chaitanya has won two TSR – TV9 National Film Awards.

Year	Category	Film	Result	Ref.
2016	Special Appreciation Award	Premam	Won	
2019	Special Jury Award	Shailaja Reddy Alludu	Won	

== Zee Cine Awards Telugu ==
Chaitanya has received one Zee Cine Awards Telugu nomination.

Year	Category	Film	Result	Ref.
2018	Entertainer of the Year	Rarandoi Veduka Chudham	Nominated	

== Media recognitions ==
- 2010: Chaitanya was placed 2nd in Rediff.com's "Top Telugu Actors" list.

Most Desirable Men

In Hyderabad Times' Most Desirable Men list, Chaitanya was placed:

- 12th in 2017
- 7th in 2018
- 11th in 2019
- 6th in 2020
