= 1st South Indian International Movie Awards =

Indian annual film awards event

- Date: 21–22 June 2012
- Hosted by: Lakshmi Manchu; R. Madhavan
- Produced by: Vibri Media Group
- Organized by: Vibri Media Group
- Official website: Dubai World Trade Centre, United Arab Emirates

Highlights
- Best Picture: Dookudu (Telugu); Ko (Tamil); Saarathi (Kannada); Indian Rupee (Malayalam)
- Most awards: Dookudu— 8

Television coverage
- Channel: Gemini TV; Sun TV; Surya TV; Udaya TV
- Network: Sun TV Network

The 1st South Indian International Movie Awards were presented on 21–22 June 2012, in Dubai, UAE, to honour the best cinematic achievements of the South Indian film industry in 2011. Producing films in four Dravidian languages of South India, professionals were handed over a total of 71 Awards. The ceremony was hosted by R. Madhavan and Lakshmi Manchu at the Dubai World Trade Centre, while the "Generation Next Awards Night" was hosted by Parvathy Omanakuttan and held a day before at Park Hyatt on 21 June 2012

Nominated by a jury, the final winners were decided by a public voting system. The most successful film was Dookudu, which fetched eight Awards in total.

== Main awards ==
=== Film ===
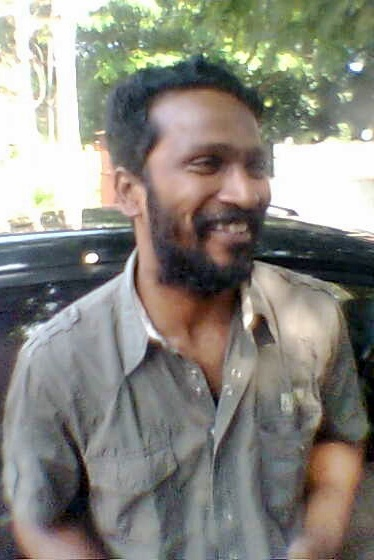
Vetrimaaran, Best Director (Tamil)

SIIMA Award for Best Film
Tamil	Telugu
Ko – RS Infotainment; Engeyum Eppothum – AR Murugadoss Productions/AR Murugadoss; Aadukalam – Group Companys, Five Star Films/Sun Pictures/S. Kathiresan; Mayakkam Enna – Aum Productions/Selvaraghavan, M. Prasad; Azhagarsamiyin Kuthirai – Escape Artists Motion Pictures/P. Madhan	Dookudu – 14 Reels Entertainment/Ram Achanta, Gopichand Achanta, Anil Sunkara; Sri Rama Rajyam – Sri Sai Baba Movies/Yalamanchali Sai Babu; Mr. Perfect – Sri Venkateswara Creations/Dil Raju; 100% Love – Geetha Arts/Bunny Vasu; Ala Modalaindi – Sri Ranjith Movies/K. L. Damodar Prasad
Kannada	Malayalam
Saarathi – Sri Araseshwari Cine Productions	Indian Rupee – August Cinema
Best Director
Tamil	Telugu
Vetrimaaran – Aadukalam	Srinu Vaitla – Dookudu; V. V. Vinayak – Badrinath; K. Dasarath – Mr. Perfect; Sukumar – 100% Love; Bapu – Sri Rama Rajyam
Kannada	Malayalam
Nagashekar – Sanju Weds Geetha	Rajesh Pillai – Traffic
Best Cinematographer
Tamil	Telugu
Velraj – Aadukalam; Richard M. Nathan – Ko; Ramji – Mayakkam Enna; Om Prakash – Vaagai Sooda Vaa; Nirav Shah – Vaanam	P. R. K. Raju – Sri Rama Rajyam; Vijay K Chakravarhy – Mr. Perfect; Venkat Prasad – 100% Love; K. V. Guhan – Dookudu; Soundar Rajan – Anaganaga O Dheerudu
Kannada	Malayalam
Sathya Hedge – Sanju Weds Geetha	Madhu Ambat – Makaramanju

=== Acting ===
Best Actor
Tamil	Telugu
Dhanush – Aadukalam; Vikram – Deiva Thirumagal; Suriya – 7 Aum Arivu; Ajith Kumar – Mankatha; Vishal – Avan Ivan	Mahesh Babu – Dookudu; Prabhas – Mr. Perfect; Naga Chaitanya – 100% Love; Nagarjuna – Rajanna; Balakrishna – Sri Rama Rajyam
Kannada	Malayalam
Puneeth Rajkumar – Hudugaru	Mohanlal – Pranayam
Best Actress
Tamil	Telugu
Asin – Kaavalan; Anjali – Engaeyum Eppothum; Anushka Shetty – Deiva Thirumagal; Hansika Motwani – Engeyum Kadhal; Richa Gangopadhyay – Mayakkam Enna	Nayanthara – Sri Rama Rajyam; Hansika Motwani – Kandireega; Samantha Ruth Prabhu – Dookudu; Kajal Aggarwal – Mr. Perfect; Tamannaah – 100% Love
Kannada	Malayalam
Ramya – Sanju Weds Geetha	Kavya Madhavan – Khaddama
Best Actor in a Supporting Role
Tamil	Telugu
Sarathkumar – Kanchana	Prakash Raj – Dookudu; ANR – Sri Rama Rajyam; Ashish Vidyarthi – Ala Modalaindi; Srihari – Aha Naa Pellanta; Baby Aney – Rajanna
Kannada	Malayalam
Aindrita Ray – Paramathma	Lena / Thalaivasal Vijay– Traffic / Karmayogi
Best Actor in a Negative Role
Tamil	Telugu
Ajmal Ameer – Ko	Lakshmi Manchu – Anaganaga O Dheerudu; Sonu Sood – Kandireega; Abhimanyu Singh – Bejawada; Pradeep Rawat – Mangala; Kelly Dorjee – Badrinath
Kannada	Malayalam
Rangayana Raghu – Sanju Weds Geetha	Kunchacko Boban – Seniors
Best Comedian
Tamil	Telugu
Santhanam – Vaanam	Brahmanandam – Dookudu; Ramesh – Ala Modalaindi; M. S. Narayana – Dookudu; Srinivasa Reddy – Solo; Ali – Mirapakay
Kannada	Malayalam
Sadhu Kokila – Hudugaru	Baburaj – Salt N' Pepper

=== Music ===
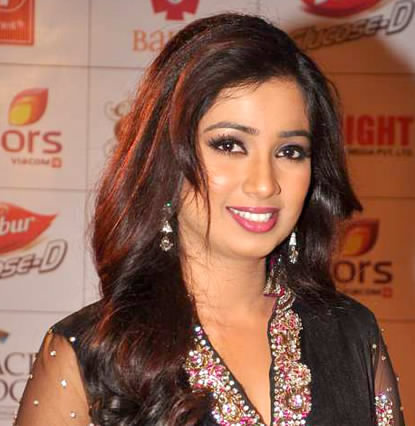
Shreya Ghoshal winning SIIMA Award for Best Female Playback Singer (Telugu)

Best Music Director
Tamil	Telugu
G. V. Prakash Kumar – Aadukalam	S. Thaman – Dookudu; M. M. Keeravani – Rajanna; Kalyani Malik – Ala Modalaindi; Ilaiyaraaja – Sri Rama Rajyam; Devi Sri Prasad – 100% Love
Kannada	Malayalam
V. Harikrishna – Hudugaru	M. Jayachandran – Pranayam
Best Lyricist
Tamil	Telugu
Na. Muthukumar – "Un Pera Theriyathe" from Engaeyum Eppothum	Ramajogayya Sastry – "Guruvaram March" from Dookudu; Chandrabose – "Infatuation" from 100% Love; Jonnavittula – "Jagadananda Karaka" from Sri Rama Rajyam; Ananta Sriram – "Chali Chaliga" from Mr. Perfect; K. Sivadatta – "Gijigadu" from Rajanna
Kannada	Malayalam
Kaviraj – "Gaganave Baagi" from Sanju Weds Geetha	Anoop Menon – "Mazhaneerthullikal" from Beautiful
Best Male Playback Singer
Tamil	Telugu
Dhanush – "Voda Voda" from Mayakkam Enna	Rahul Nambiar – "Guruvaram March" from Dookudu; Adnan Sami – "Infatuation" from 100% Love; Yuvan Shankar Raja – "Panjaa" from Panjaa; Hemachandra – "Prema Desam" from Shakti; S. P. Balasubrahmanyam – "Jagadananda Karaka" from Sri Rama Rajyam
Kannada	Malayalam
Avinash Chebbi – "Nee Adana Nee" from Murali Meets Meera	Vijay Yesudas – "Ee Pozhayum" from Indian Rupee
Best Female Playback Singer
Tamil	Telugu
Chinmayi – "Sara Sara" from Vaagai Sooda Vaa	Shreya Ghoshal – "Chali Chaliga" from Mr. Perfect; Sunidhi Chauhan – "Nath Nath" from Badrinath; Swathi Reddy – "A Square B Square" from 100% Love; Nithya Menen – "Ammammo Ammo" from Ala Modalaindi; Malavika – "Amma Avanee" from Rajanna
Kannada	Malayalam
Akanksha Badami – "Tightu Tightu" from Rajadhani	Manjari – "Chinni Chinni" from Urumi

== Debutant & Special Awards ==
Best Debutant Director
Tamil	Telugu
M. Saravanan – Engaeyum Eppothum	B.V. Nandini Reddy – Ala Modalaindi; Santosh Srinivas – Kandireega; Venu Sree Raam – Oh My Friend; Veerabhadram Chowdary – Aha Naa Pellanta; Ajay Bhuyan – Dhada
Kannada	Malayalam
Pon Kumaran – Vishnuvardhana	Salim Ahamed – Adaminte Makan Abu
Best Male Debutant
Tamil	Telugu
Sharwanand – Engaeyum Eppothum; Nani - Veppam	Aadi – Prema Kavali; Mano Tej – Babloo; Arvind Krishna – It's My Love Story; Abhijeet – Life Before Wedding; Ajay – Nuvvila
Kannada	Malayalam
Srikanth – Olave Mandhara	Unni Mukundan – Bombay March 12
Best Female Debutant
Tamil	Telugu
Hansika Motwani – Mappillai	Shruti Haasan – Anaganaga O Dheerudu; Nithya Menen – Ala Modalaindi; Isha Chawla – Prema Kavali; Amala Paul – Bejawada; Nikitha Narayan – It's My Love Story; Sarah-Jane Dias – Panjaa
Kannada	Malayalam
Akanksha Mansurkar – Olave Mandhara	Karthika Nair – Makaramanju

Special Appreciation
Baby Aney
Actor – Special Appreciation
Tamil	Telugu
Vikram – Deiva Thirumagal	Nagarjuna – Rajanna
Kannada	Malayalam
Upendra	Salim Kumar – Adaminte Makan Abu
Actress – Special Appreciation
Tamil	Telugu
Richa Gangopadhyay – Mayakkam Enna	Hansika Motwani – Kandireega
Kannada	Malayalam
Nidhi Subbaiah – Krishnan Marriage Story	Swetha Menon – Rathinirvedam

== Honorary awards ==
- SIIMA Lifetime Achievement Award: Ambareesh
- SIIMA Award for Social Responsibility: Shivarajkumar

== Generation Next awards ==
- Sensational art director: Sabu Cyril
- Sensation of South Indian cinema: Dance choreographer Imran
- Sensation of South Indian cinema: Action Choreographer Peter Hein
- Stylish villain of South cinema: Sonu Sood
- Rising Female star of South Indian cinema: Amala Paul
- Rising Male star of South Indian cinema: Nani
- Stylish star of South Indian cinema: Lakshmi Rai
- Stylish actor of South Indian cinema: Silambarasan
- Pride of South Indian cinema: Shruti Haasan
- Youth icon of South Indian cinema: Rana Daggubati
- Youth icon of South Indian cinema: Anushka Shetty
- Sensation of South Indian cinema: Dhanush
