= Bunny Vas =

Indian film producer (born 1981)

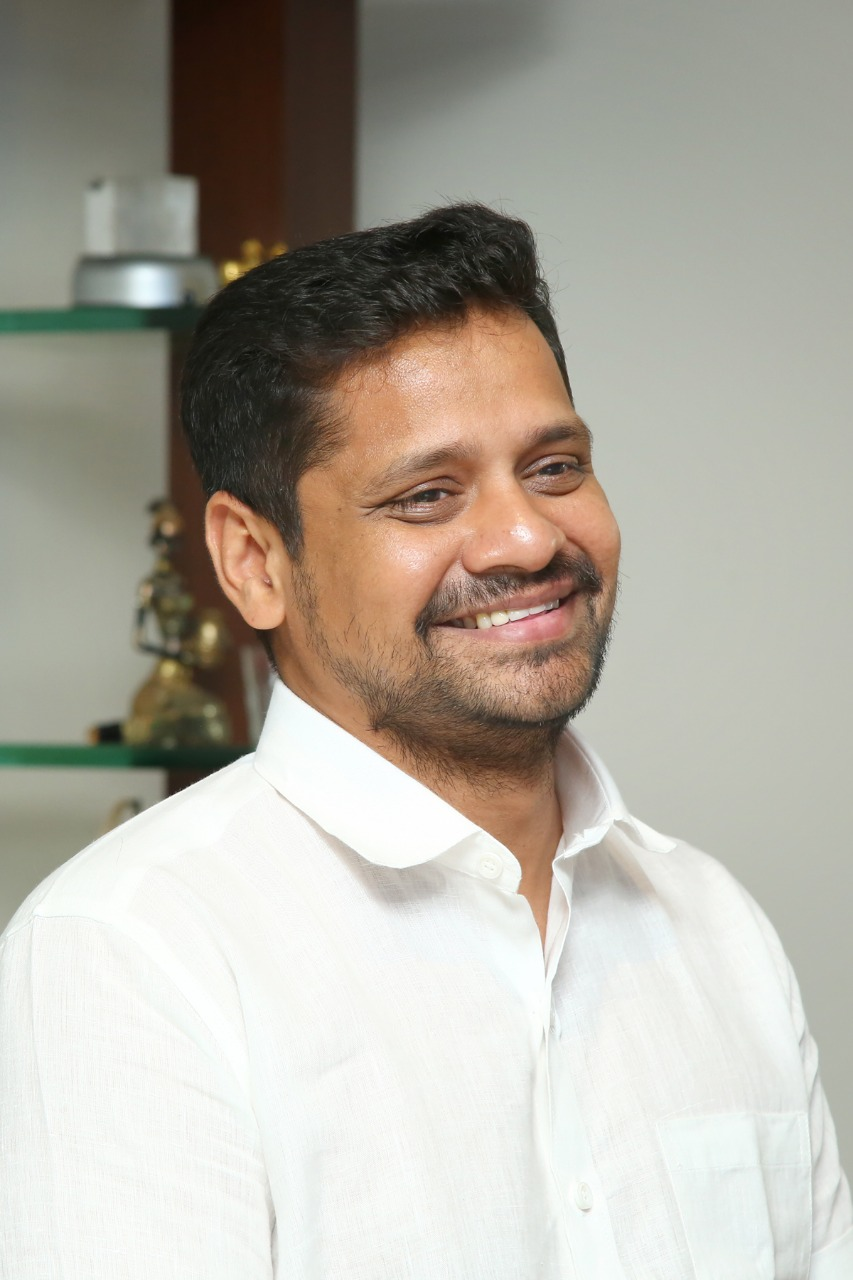
- Born: 11 June 1981 (age 45); Palakollu, Andhra Pradesh, India
- Occupations: Film producer, film distributor

Udaya Srinivas Gavara, popularly known as Bunny Vas, is an Indian film producer and distributor who produces Telugu films. He is a partner of GA2 Pictures, a production company which he co-founded with Allu Aravind. His films have included Bhale Bhale Magadivoy, Geetha Govindam and 100% Love. He also was the co-producer for the films Sarrainodu and Naa Peru Surya.

== Early life and career ==
Bunny Vas was born in Palakollu in West Godavari district. He started off as an employee in Geetha Arts, eventually working alongside Allu Aravind. Working with Vamsi of UV Creations, he has distributed 57 films for Guntur and West Godavari regions, including Pokiri, Arya, and Magadheera. He was also the distributor for the film Gabbar Singh.

Aravind and Allu Arjun later made him a partner in GA2 Pictures, which is a subsidiary of Geetha Arts.

== Filmography ==
As producer

List of film credits
Year	Film	Notes
2011	100% Love	Produced under GA2
2014	Kotha Janta	Produced under GA2
2014	Pilla Nuvu Leni Jeevitham	Produced under GA2
2015	Bhale Bhale Mogadivoi	Produced under GA2
2017	Next Nuvve	Produced under GA2
2018	Geetha Govindam	Produced under GA2
2019	Prathi Roju Pandagey	Produced under GA2
2021	Chaavu Kaburu Challaga	Produced under GA2
2021	Most Eligible Bachelor	Produced under GA2
2022	Pakka Commercial	Produced under GA2
2022	18 Pages	Produced under GA2
2023	Vinaro Bhagyamu Vishnu Katha	Produced under GA2
2023	Kota Bommali PS	Produced under GA2
2024	Ambajipeta Marriage Band	Produced under GA2
2024	Aay	Produced under GA2
2025	Thandel	Produced under GA2

As distributor

List of film credits
Year	Film	Notes
2025	Little Hearts	
2025	Raju Weds Rambai	
2025	Eesha	
2026	Hey Balwanth	
