= Bejawada (film) =

- Theatrical release poster
- Directed by: Vivek Krishna
- Screenplay by: Vivek Krishna
- Story by: Vivek Krishna; Ram Gopal Varma
- Produced by: Ram Gopal Varma; Renny Johnson
- Starring: Naga Chaitanya; Amala Paul
- Cinematography: S. Bhupathy
- Edited by: Gautham Raju
- Music by: Pradeep Koneru; Vikram Negi; Bapi-Tutul; Amar Mohile
- Production company: Shreya Productions
- Distributed by: Varma
- Release date: 1 December 2011
- Country: India
- Language: Telugu

Bejawada or Bezawada is a 2011 Indian Telugu-language action crime film based on the Vijayawada Gang Warfare, directed by Vivek Krishna and produced by Ram Gopal Varma and Renny Johnson. The film stars Naga Chaitanya and Amala Paul. The film was met with a disappointing box office reception, but positively at television and OTT as it accurately depicted the historical gang war in Vijayawada. Later it was dubbed in Hindi as Hero: The Action Man and also in Tamil as Vikram Dhadha. It marked Amala Paul’s Telugu debut.

== Plot ==
Kali Prasad, aka Kali, is the man of the masses in Bejawada. His group has a stronghold on the temple city. Vijay Krishna is the right hand to Kali. Kali's brother Shankar Prasad, aka Shankar, does not like the supremacy of Vijay Krishna. Due to this personal grudge, Shankar brutally kills his brother Kali and wounds then spreads the rumour in Bejawada about Vijay Krishna being the killer. With the help of politician Ramana, Shankar plans to become a politician but fails due to Vijay Krishna's authority on student and labor unions. Vijay Krishna has two brothers, Jaya Krishna and Siva Krishna.

Shankar then assassinates Vijay Krishna. This Prompts Vijay's brother, Siva Krishna, to seek revenge on Shankar. Siva's college-mate Geetha, who is the daughter of the top brass policeman Adi Vishnu, is in love with Siva.

Her father doesn't accept their relationship, so Geetha leaves her father and stays with Siva despite his family's protests. Enraged, Siva then a gang war ensues, and then Shankar kills Siva's second elder brother Jaya Krishna, which eventually provokes Siva to kill Shankar. The film ends with Siva killing Shankar and wounded becoming the new godfather of Bejawada.

== Cast ==
- Naga Chaitanya as Siva Krishna, "Siva"
- Amala Paul as Geethanjali, "Geetha"
- Abhimanyu Singh as Shankar Prasad
- Rajeev Pillai as Srinivas Sachin Raghuram
- Prabhu as Kali Prasad
- Mukul Dev as Vijay Krishna
- Subhalekha Sudhakar as Reddy
- Kota Srinivasa Rao as Ramana
- Ajay as Jaya Krishna
- Ahuti Prasad as Adi Vishnu
- Brahmanandam as Sketch Gopi
- M. S. Narayana as Veera Venkata Durga Prasad
- Prudhvi Raj
- Sravan
- Bharath Raju
- Satya Prakash
- Ashok Kumar

== Production ==
Ram Gopal Varma announced that he was to direct a Telugu film titled Bejawada Rowdilu in a press note in September 2010, which would revolve around the rowdy wars of Vijayawada, also known as Bejawada. The title started a controversy from Vijayawada locales who felt that title wrongly defamed their city, so Varma in August 2011 announced that the film would simply be known as Bejawada. The film was officially launched on 12 May 2011 with Ram Gopal Varma's protégé, Vivek Krishna, announced as the director. The team held a photo shoot and filmed for two days in Vijayawada with Preetika Rao, before removing her from the project with the producer citing that she looked older than the lead actor, Naga Chaitanya. She was subsequently replaced by Amala Paul.

== Soundtrack ==
Bejawada

Soundtrack album to Bejawada by Vikram Negi, Bapitutul, Amar Mohile, Pradeep Koneru, Prem
- Released: 7 November 2011
- Recorded: 2011
- Genre: Feature film soundtrack
- Length: 36:09
- Language: Telugu
- Label: Aditya Music
- Producer: Ram Gopal Varma
External audio
- Official Audio Jukebox on YouTube

The audio songs were released in an FM Studio in Hyderabad. Bejawada's audio release function was a rather low key affair. The songs were released in the market on 7 November. Vikram Negi, Bapitutul, Amar Mohile, Pradeep Koneru, Prem have scored the music for Bejawada.

Track #	Song	Singer(s)	Composition	Lyrics	Length
1	"Durgamma Krishnamma"	Jojo Nathaniel	Vikram Negi	Rehman	05:09
2	"Adagaku Nannemi"	Javed Ali, Chandreyee Bhattacharya	Bapitutul	Kaluva Sai	03:52
3	"Ninnu Chusina"	Javed Ali, Swetha Pandit	Amar Mohile	Sira Sri	05:00
4	"Konte Choopulu"	Vedala Hemachandra, Geetha Madhuri	Pradeep Koneru	Rehman	03:38
5	"Rammu Ginnu"	Deepthi Chari	Praveen Koneru	Sira Sri	05:38
6	"Aigiri Nandini"	Ravi Shankar	Sri Adi Shankaracharya		04:11
7	"Beza Beza"	Jojo Nanathiel	Amar Mohile	Sira Sri	03:04
8	"Le Legara"	Srikanth	Prem	Chaitanya Prasad	04:15

== Critical reception ==
Rediff.com rated it 1.5/5 and stated that "Bezawada is let down by its script". The Times Of India rated it 1/5 and said that "Despite all the expectations riding on it, "Bejawada" joins the long list of disasters from the RGV factory."

== Accolades ==
SIIMA Awards

- Nominated – Best Female Debut (Telugu)- Amala Paul
