= Dhada =

2011 Telugu-language film

- Theatrical release poster
- Directed by: Ajay Bhuyan
- Screenplay by: Ajay Bhuyan; Shiv Singh
- Dialogues by: Abburi Ravi
- Story by: Ajay Bhuyan
- Produced by: D. Siva Prasad Reddy
- Starring: Naga Chaitanya; Kajal Aggarwal
- Cinematography: Gnana Shekar V.S.
- Edited by: Dharmendra Kakarala
- Music by: Devi Sri Prasad
- Production company: Sri Kamakshi Enterprises
- Distributed by: R. R. Movies
- Release date: 11 August 2011
- Running time: 130 minutes
- Country: India
- Language: Telugu
- Budget: ₹30 million (US$320,000)
- Box office: ₹12 million (US$130,000)

Dhada (transl. Tremor) is a 2011 Indian Telugu-language action comedy film directed by Ajay Bhuyan and produced by D. Siva Prasad Reddy. The film features Naga Chaitanya and Kajal Aggarwal. The music composed by Devi Sri Prasad, cinematography by Gnana Shekar V.S of Vedam fame, editing by Dharmendra Kakarala of Prasthanam and LBW - Life Before Wedding fame.

The film was dubbed into Tamil as Tiger Vishva. The film has action scenes inspired from the 2009 film, Sherlock Holmes. Dhada collected ₹12 million (US$130,000)(gross) in its total run. The film received negative reviews and was a box office failure.

== Plot ==
Viswa an angry young man who had done his Master graduate in Texas USA who desperately wants to go back to India and settle down because he had sweet memories with his late parents in India. His family members are introduced, namely his older brother Rajiv and his sister-in-law Preethi who are settled in US who they don't want Viswa to leave them. Viswa meets Rhea, who is the only lonely daughter of a wealthy business tycoon Mahendra who is concerned about money and growth, but not about affection and love.

Meanwhile, Viswa is trying to get Rhea's attention. He accidentally gets into a quarrel with a gang that does business with human trafficking. He fights and frees some girls who are abducted. Then the gang leader RD got pressure from his new client Kelly who is going to buy those girls then both gangs tries to find Viswa and kill him. Slowly, Rhea falls for Viswa, and they decided to get married with the acceptance of Rajeev and Preethi. Rhea decided to confess her relationship to her father. Meanwhile, Mahendra sets up a proposal with another business tycoon Amit. Rhea is not interested and reveals her relationship with Viswa. Then Amit stands for her to convince Mahendra, and Viswa meets him to thank him for his support.

Then, it is revealed that Rajeev is working under RD and also killed Preethi's father. Having no clue about Viswa, RD orders Rajeev to find out the person who destroyed his business. Rajeev accepts to find him soon.

RD and Kelly soon coincidentally find out that Rajeev is the older brother of Viswa and tries to nab them. Meanwhile, Rajeev also finds out regarding this and tries to save his brother from the gang. Viswa questions his brother, thinking who suddenly changes his mind to go to India. Then, there is no option left. Rajeev reveals for whom he works, why he was here and also reveals that RD, who actually triggered the gun through his gunpoint to kill his father-in-law from that day onwards to protect Preethi from RD he became a concubine and forced to serve him. Then Viswa makes him confident and decided to confront them.

Then, in the fight, RD and Kelly reveal that they have abducted Rhea and showed her video, who was sedated and decided to sell her. Then, waiting for the opportunity, Rajeev and Viswa managed to kill all the gang, including RD and Kelly.

Then Viswa soon reaches to rescue Rhea, surprises Amit by revealing he is the master mind behind the abduction of Rhea and attempting to kill him. Then Amit shows his real face and reveals that he was disappointed when Rhea rejected him, having an insatiable lust on her he felt possessive and reached out RD to give a contract to kill Viswa and finds he was his common enemy and joined hands with them and orchestrates the whole plan. Then, the fight ensues between them. Eventually, Viswa becomes victorious and kills Amit. Before dying, he tries to kill Rhea by locking her in a car and throwing the car into an ocean, but Viswa saves her. The film ends with Viswa bringing Rhea out of the ocean in a blanket and them talking.

== Cast ==
- Naga Chaitanya as Viswa
- Kajal Aggarwal as Rhea
- Sriram as Rajiv, Viswa's brother
- Samiksha as Preethi, Viswa's sister-in-law
- Brahmanandam as Krishna Satyannarayana
- Ashish Vidyarthi as Raj Gopal, Viswa's father
- Suhasini Maniratnam as Vasanthi, Viswa's mother
- Rahul Dev as RD
- Eijaz Khan as Amit
- Kelly Dorji as Kelly
- Mukesh Rishi as Dhanraj, Rhea's father
- Janaki Sabesh as Rajyalakshmi, Preethi's mother
- Junaid Sheikh as Michael
- Uttej
- Venu Madhav as Venu
- Tanikella Bharani as Narayana Murthy, Preethi's father (cameo)
- Satya Krishnan as Spandana, Rhea's mother (cameo)
- Aruna Shields as an item number "Bhoome Gundranga"

== Production ==
Reports emerged in December 2009 that director Ajay Bhuyan would direct a film starring Naga Chaitanya in the lead role. The film soon began production works with Kajal Aggarwal being signed on in a leading role, with the producers announcing a release date of July 2010. The producers approached Arjun and Kamalinee Mukherjee to appear as the brother and the sister-in-law of Naga Chaitanya, although talks were unsuccessful. Subsequently, Srikanth and Anita Hassanandani were selected for the roles, but Anita opted out before her schedule began and was then replaced by Samiksha.

The film began shooting in May 2010 after delays. The film was completed in four schedules, with the climax being shot in Bangkok, Thailand.

== Soundtrack ==
Dhada

Soundtrack album by Devi Sri Prasad
- Released: 5 January 2011
- Recorded: 2010
- Genre: Feature film soundtrack
- Length: 26:47
- Language: Telugu
- Label: Aditya Music
- Producer: Devi Sri Prasad

Devi Sri Prasad chronology
Venghai (2011)	Dhada (2011)	Oosaravelli (2011)
External audio
- Official Audio Jukebox on YouTube

The soundtrack was composed by Devi Sri Prasad. The music was released on 25 July 2011 at Shilpa Kala Vedika, Hyderabad. The soundtrack consists of seven tracks. It was released by Aditya Music. Akkineni Nageswara Rao and Dr D Ramanaidu attended the function as chief guests.

Track-List
No.	Title	Lyrics	Singer(s)	Length
1.	"Bhoome Gundranga"	Ramajogayya Sastry	Richard, Ranina Reddy	04:02
2.	"Hello Hello"	Ananth Sreeram	Nikhil D'Souza, Neha Bhasin	04:17
3.	"Telugu Bengali"	Ananth Sreeram	Neeraj Shridhar, Sricharan, Megha	04:54
4.	"Godava Godava"	Ramajogayya Sastry	Karthik, Priya Himesh	03:57
5.	"Diwali Deepanni"	Ramajogayya Sastry	Kalyan, Andrea Jeremiah	03:55
6.	"Chinnaga Chinnaga"	Ananth Sreeram	Sagar	01:17
7.	"Ey Pilla"	Ramajogayya Sastry	Jaspreet Jasz, Suchitra,	04:32
Total length:				26:47

== Accolades ==
Filmfare Awards South

- Nominated - Best Playback Singer - Female - Neha Bhasin – "Hello Hello"

SIIMA Awards

- Nominated - Best Debutant Director - Ajay Bhuyan
