= Celebrity Badminton League =

Celebrity Badminton League CBL
- Country: India
- Website: www.cblindia.com
- Founding Year: 2016

Founding Team
- CEO and Founder: L Hemachandran
- Founding Director: L Raghuraman
- Investor: JP Academy Mr.Praveen J

Season 1 Captains
- Chennai Rockers: Arya (actor)
- Karnataka Alps: Diganth
- Kerala Royals: Jayaram
- Tollywood Thunders: Sudheer Babu

Season 1 Brand Ambassador
- Gokulam Chennai Rockers: Madhavan
- Karnataka Warriors: Puneeth Rajkumar
- Tollywood Thunders: Naga Chaitanya
- Kerala Royals: Mamtha Mohandas

Season 1 Team Motivators
- Chennai Rockers: Amala Paul
- Karnataka Alps: Aindrita Rai
- Tollywood Thunders: Lakshmi Manchu
- Kerala Royals: Pearle Manney

Team Owners / Founders
- Chennai Rockers: BAIJU GOKULAM
- Karnataka Warriors: RAJIV AND BAKTHI
- Kerala Royals: [Ranjith Karunakaran]
- Tollywood Thunders: Nandini Vijay

Celebrity Badminton League - CBL is an Indian-based new league platform for celebrities started in Jan 2016 to exhibit their badminton talent. It is combination of sports and entertainment with cine stars taking part in CBL season 1 played by four south Indian states namely Tamil Nadu - Chennai Rockers, Kerala - Kerala Royals, Karnataka - Karnataka Alps and Telangana - Tollywood Thunders.

== Seasons ==
=== Season 1 ===
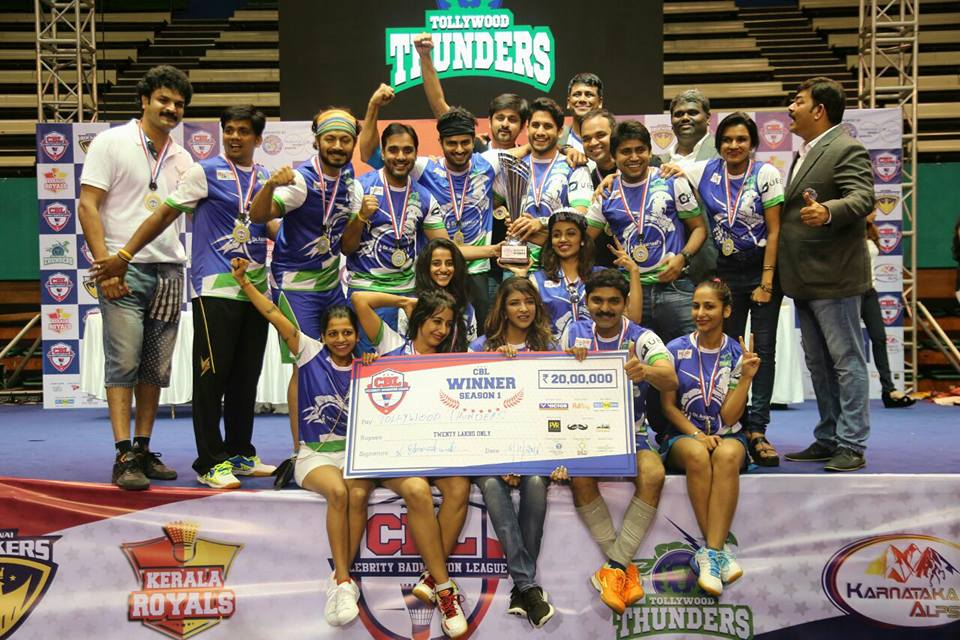
Winners - CBL Season 1

CBL Season 1 held from 17 September 2016 -Chennai to 12 November 2016 Finals in Malaysia in success.

Hemachandran L, Founding Director and CEO of Celebrity Badminton League Pvt Ltd, said during a press meet, "The first season will have four teams representing Kollywood, Mollywood, Sandalwood and Tollywood film industries."

The Tamil Nadu team (Chennai Rockers) was headed by actor Arya. The Kerala franchise (Kerala Royals) roped in actor Jayaram as the captain. The Karnataka franchise (Karnataka Alps) captain actor Diganth headed the team. Tollywood Thunders was captaining the team.

The tournament was inaugurated on 17 September and the league matches was hosted in Kochi and Hyderabad. The final match was held at Kuala Lumpur. Malaysia Event 12 Nov 2016 - CBL SEASON 1 Winner TOLLYWOOD THUNDERS

India’s First Celebrity Badminton League (CBL) - Season 1 finals was played at Malaysia in Stadium Badminton Cheras, KL. CBL Season 1 had Four Celebrity teams representing Tollywood- Tollywood Thunders, Mollywood- Kerala Royals, Kollywood- Chennai Rockers and Sandalwood- Karnataka Alps. Tollywood Thunders beat Kerala Royals to emerge as the victorious Team that was a tightly contested final. Team Karnataka Alps was placed third while Team Chennai Rockers took the last position.

=== Season 2 ===
CBL season 2 has seen many changes with change in team owners of Tamil Nadu and Karnataka. Chennai team has been taken over by Vice Chairman of GOKULAM GROUP OF COMPANIES Baiju Gopalan for 2 Cr rupees. and Karnataka team has been taken over by Rajiv and Bakthi Talreja of Dreamcraft event management company.

CBL was able to sustain second year with support of Franchise owners. They are in the process of raising Venture Capital Funding. Season 3 will take place in Mumbai and Dubai in December 2018 and will involve Bollywood as well.
