= Makaramanju =

2011 film by Lenin Rajendran

- Directed by: Lenin Rajendran
- Written by: Lenin Rajendran
- Produced by: B Rakesh
- Starring: Santhosh Sivan; Karthika Nair; Nithya Menon; Lakshmi Sharma; Mallika Kapoor; Jagathy Sreekumar; Bala; Chithra Iyer; Saiju Kurup
- Cinematography: Madhu Ambat
- Edited by: Mahesh Narayanan
- Music by: Ramesh Narayan
- Distributed by: Sree Gokulam Films
- Release date: 30 September 2011
- Country: India
- Language: Malayalam

Makaramanju (English: The Mist of Capricorn) is a 2011 Malayalam language romantic drama film written and directed by Lenin Rajendran. The film is about a certain stage in the life of a celebrated painter, Raja Ravi Varma. It also narrates the story of the epic character, Pururavas. Cinematographer Santhosh Sivan and Karthika Nair appear in the lead roles. The movie is the latter's major Malayalam debut (in her mother tongue).

"Urvashi Pururavas" is the painting woven into the film's narrative. In a story within a story format, Lenin Rajendran intertwines the story of the artist with that of the mythological Urvashi and her beloved King Pururavas. The film received mixed reviews upon release. It was one of the five Malayalam films to be screened at the International Film Festival of India. It won the FIPRESCI Prize for Best Malayalam Film at the International Film Festival of Kerala. It was nominated at the National Film Awards for 2010.

== Plot ==
The film tells the story of Raja Ravi Varma at a certain stage in his life. He is in the process of painting a masterpiece. The theme of his painting is Pururavas, the legendary king who fell in love with the heavenly nymph, Urvashi, who later agrees to become his wife on certain conditions, but disappears without a trace when she discovers that the conditions were violated. Pururavas wanders all around to find her and ultimately unites with her. Ravi Varma, during his work, finds himself attracted to his model, Sugandha Bai, and this relationship begins to acquire certain shades of the legend of Urvashi and Pururavas. Together they are thrown into a torrent of love and passion which they find difficult to escape.

== Cast ==
- Santhosh Sivan as Raja Ravi Varma and Pururavas. Cinematographer Sivan made his acting debut through this film. He dons dual roles in the film, and is paired with three different heroines. Coincidentally, Sivan had made use of themes from Ravi Varma's paintings - Damayanti and the swan, Lady in thought and Girl carrying milk tray - in his directorial venture Anandabhadram.
- Karthika Nair as Suganda Baai and Urvashi. Karthika dons her second full-length role through this film, as well as makes her Malayalam debut. The film is considered to be a breakthrough in her career and there have been reports that Academy Award-winning British director Danny Boyle was impressed with Karthika's performance in the film and had signed her in his next project.
- Lakshmi Sharma as Bhageerathi, Ravi Varma's wife.
- Mallika Kapoor as Vasundhara, wife of Pururavas.
- Jagathy Sreekumar as Govardhandas Makhanji, Ravi Varma's business partner.
- Saiju Kurup as Raja Raja Varma, Ravi Varma's younger brother.
- Chithra Iyer as Rukku Baai, Suganda's mother.
- Nithya Menon as Malayali Penkutty
- Poorna as a model
- Dinesh Panicker as Divan
- Chitra Iyer as Sugandha
- Vishnupriya (cameo appearance)
- Malavika Wales in an uncredited role.

== Voice dubbing ==
- Actor Biju Menon has dubbed the voice for Santhosh Sivan.
- Bhagyalakshmi - Bhageerathy-(Lekshmi Sharma)
- Praveena- Vasundhara (Malika Kapoor)
- Vimmy Mariam George - Urvashi/ Sugandhitha Bhai (Karthika Nair)

== Awards ==
International Film Festival of Kerala 2010

- FIPRESCI Prize for Best Malayalam Film

Kerala State Film Awards 2010

- Kerala State Film Award for Second Best Film
- Best Choreography - Madu Gopinath & Saji Vakkom
- Best Costume Designer- S B Satheesh

Kerala Film Critics Association Awards 2010

- Best Debut Actress - Karthika Nair

Vanitha Film Award 2010

- Best Debut Actress - Karthika Nair

1st South Indian International Movie Awards 2010

- Best Debut Actress - Karthika Nair
- Best Cinematographer - Madhu Ambat

== Production ==
Lenin Rajendran was the first to make a film on Swati Tirunal, the royal composer from Kerala. Through Makaramanju, the filmmaker pays homage to Raja Ravi Varma. The director says it is the artist's special place in Indian art that had drawn him to his life. "A few years ago, I had done a play on Ravi Varma for KPAC. During my reading and research on him, I was fascinated to know more about the man and the circumstances in which those works were created. Here was a prince who had paid a price for pursuing his passion for the arts. He faced hostility and criticism but that did not put an end to his affair with brush and paint. Cases were filed against him but he fought against the orthodoxy and won the right to express himself. I felt there was space for a movie," he explains. Instead of a biopic on the artist, the director wanted to focus on the artist at work, and chose a single work to unfold the life of the artist and the period he worked and lived in. "Although his style was European, his themes were from Indian mythology. In each of his works on the Indian Puranas, he chose a point in the story that was filled with drama and emotion. I was struck by the sensitivity and acumen of the man who used his brush to depict those moments. That is why I felt I could understand him better if I concentrated on a work and then narrate the story of the artist's creative process," says the director.

The principal production began in October 2009. The film's set has been put up in an old bungalow known as the Church bungalow on the compound of a Lutheran church near Pallichal in Thiruvananthapuram district. The film was also shot in Kochi and Mumbai.

== Music ==
Makaramanju

Soundtrack album by Ramesh Narayan
- Released: 2010
- Genre: Feature film soundtrack
- Labels: M. C. Audios & Videos

The film's music has been composed by Ramesh Narayan. There are eight tracks in the soundtrack, with lyrics by Kavalam Narayana Panicker, K. Jayakumar, and Chandran Nair.

No.	Title	Writer(s)	Artist(s)	Length
1.	"Manjil Melle"	Chandran Nair	K. J. Yesudas
2.	"Aahko Chahiye"	K. Jayakumar	Hariharan & Sujatha
3.	"Mele Mele"	Kavalam Narayana Panicker	Ramesh Narayan & Anuradha Sriram
4.	"Then Thennale"	Kavalam Narayana Panicker	Srinivas, Sunita Menon
5.	"Kaanuvaanere"	K. Jayakumar	Hariharan & Sujatha
6.	"Mele Mele"	Kavalam Narayana Panicker	Ramesh Narayan
7.	"Mosobathiya"	Traditional	Manjari
8.	"Saalabhanjike"	Chandran Nair	Ramesh Narayan

== Reviews ==
The film received mixed reviews from various critics. A review by Nowrunning.com writes: "Makaramanju loses grip on its material halfway through, and remains an elusive piece that doesn't tug at your heart strings. Which is why, you walk out of the hall mumbling to yourself that perhaps a bit more clever scripting could have made all the difference." Rediff.com's reviewer said that the film "is watchable but you have to brush up your knowledge of mythology and history to fully appreciate it."

== Accolades ==
Ceremony	Category	Nominee	Result
1st South Indian International Movie Awards	Best Cinematographer	Madhu Ambat	Won
40th Kerala State Film Awards	Kerala State Film Award for Second Best Film	Lenin Rajendran	Won
