= Proprietors: Kammath & Kammath =

- Theatrical release poster
- Directed by: Thomson K. Thomas
- Written by: Udayakrishna-Siby K. Thomas
- Produced by: Anto Joseph
- Starring: Mammootty; Dileep; Baburaj; Karthika Nair; Rima Kallingal; Suraj Venjaramoodu
- Cinematography: Anil Nair
- Edited by: Mahesh Narayanan
- Music by: Songs: M. Jayachandran; Background Score: Gopi Sundar
- Production company: Anto Joseph Film Company
- Distributed by: Ann Mega Media Release
- Release date: 25 January 2013
- Running time: 160 minutes
- Country: India
- Language: Malayalam
- Box office: ₹13.5 crore

Proprietors: Kammath & Kammath is a 2013 Indian Malayalam-language action comedy film, written by Udayakrishna-Siby K. Thomas, directed by Thomson K. Thomas and produced by Anto Joseph. The film features Mammootty and Dileep in the title roles alongside Baburaj, Karthika Nair, Rima Kallingal and Suraj Venjaramoodu in pivotal roles with an ensemble supporting cast. It marks the debut of Dhanush in Malayalam cinema, who made cameo in the film as well as the most recent Malayalam film role of Karthika Nair. The film was a commercial success at the box office.

The film centers around two brothers, Raja Raja Kammath, the elder brother and Deva Raja Kammath, the younger brother who have a business endeavor that changes their lives forever.

== Plot ==
Brothers Raja and Deva Raja Kammath bake and sell dosa (savory South Indian crêpes) at a small stand to support their poor family. Eventually, their dosa receives critical acclaim, and their stand grows into a restaurant, later becoming a franchise across South India. Their rival, Sulaiman Sahib, blocks the entry of Kammath Sr. He runs a non-vegetarian restaurant that is opposite a now defunct Brahmin vegetarian restaurant. He plans to acquire the restaurant's land.

The Kammath brothers build a new restaurant inside the defunct restaurant. On opening day, the municipal secretary Mahalakshmi and ward counselor Sebastian Kuzhivelil are brought by Sulaiman Sahib to stop it from opening. They fail to do so, and the restaurant's name is now Kammath & Kammath and it has obtained a new license and ownership.

Sulaiman Sahib and Sebastian, with the help of a thief, Pathrose, throw stones and break Mahalakshmi's house's windows, framing Raja for the crime. He is arrested and subsequently meets Deva in the lockup after he was arrested for allegedly selling liquor in their new restaurant illegally. The Kammath Brothers threaten Pathrose in the police station, who reveals that he threw the stones at Mahalakshmi's house. The restaurant closed circuit security cameras reveals that people sent by Sebastian brought the liquor bottles to the restaurant to implicate Deva.

Later, both Mahalakshmi and Sulaiman Sahib are convinced by Raja that they are not troublemakers, and both befriend him. The Kammath brothers open their new restaurant in Coimbatore with the superstar Dhanush as the inaugurator. One night, Sunnichan attacks Mahalakshmi, asking about his sister while she was coming back to Palakkad from Coimbatore. Raja saves her from Sunnichan by sending his bodyguard Gopi to deal with him. On this journey, Raja and Mahalakshmi go to a restaurant for dinner. Raja meets his old wife with her new husband.

While continuing the journey back to home, Raja reveals why he left his wife. One day, when his father suffered from chest pain, his mother asked the wife to drive him to hospital. She refuses as she had just applied Mehndi and wanted it to dry. When Raja's mother called a taxi and arrived at the hospital, his father passed away. Angered, Raja realised she is incompatible and divorces her. Mahalakshmi pities him after hearing the story.

The next day, Raja is invited by Mahalakshmi to talk about a problem. She introduces her sister Surekha to Raja and says Surekha believes somebody is following her. The next day, Raja sends Gopi to beat a helmeted person who approaches her. When Raja removes the helmet, he realises it is Deva. Saddened that he has beaten his own brother, he slaps Gopi for hitting Deva. Deva tells Raja that he loves Surekha. Raja thinks that Mahalakshmi planned this to separate the brothers. They both fight and leave. After, another person with a helmet who was following her arrives. Raja proceeds with Deva's idea to marry Surekha. Mahalakshmi tells them that Surekha is actually her deceased brother Suresh's wife and a Christian. Surekha's history is revealed by Mahalakshmi.

Suresh had married her years ago despite opposition from her family. On the first night of marriage, Suresh is killed by her family's henchman Vikram. The story reveals that Sunnichan is her actual brother and Vikram was another person who was following her. Even after knowing this story, Deva wishes to marry her. Later at her house, the brothers realise to their shock that Surekha is speech impaired. Deva still wants to marry her, and Mahalakshmi finally accepts.

On the night before the wedding, Deva is accosted by Vikram and Surekha's brothers. He escapes to a warehouse where Raja awaits. A fight ensues where Raja, Deva, and Gopi fight off Vikram, Surekha's brothers, and their henchmen. The next day, they are handed over to the police at Surekha's house and Deva marries Surekha. To everyone's surprise, Mahalakshmi is married by the groom found by Suresh, whom Raja selects.

== Cast ==
- Mammootty as Raja Raja Kammath
  - Ashwin as Young Raja
- Dileep as Deva Raja Kammath
  - Master anzad as Young Deva
- Baburaj as Gopi
  - Jeevan Gopal as Young Gopi
- Karthika Nair as Surekha, widow of Suresh, who later marries Deva
- Rima Kallingal as Mahalakshmi, Municipal Secretary, younger sister of Suresh
- Suraj Venjaramoodu as Sebastian Kuzhiveli, Municipal councillor
- Rajalakshmi as Raja's and Deva's mother
- Santhosh as DYSP George
- Rizabawa as Sulaiman Sahib
- Sukumari as Annamma, Surekha's grandmother
- Deepak Jethi as Vikram Chhetri
- Spadikam George as Varkeychan
- Shiju as Sunnichan
- Joju George as Tomichan
- Kalabhavan Shajon as Pathrose
- Janardhanan as Vishnu Namboothiri (Thirumeni)
- Sadiq as CI Salman
- Manoj Nair as SI Ameen
- Ambika Mohan as Maheshwari
- Bindu Ramakrishnan as Karthyayani, Thirumeni's wife
- Thesni Khan as Shantha, Mahalakshmi's Home maid
- Balachandran Chullikadu as Sathyaneshan, Raja's and Deva's father
- Rajeev Parameshwar as Mahalakshmi's bride
- Vishnupriya as Thirumeni's Daughter
- Deepika Mohan
- Abu Salim as Alex
- Kamna Jethmalani
- Vishnu Unnikrishnan as Muthu, a young thief
- Malini Sivaraman as hostess in the Inauguration of Kammath & Kammath hotel
- Siddique as the narrator (voice only)

=== Cameo appearances ===
- Narain as Suresh, an Indian Revenue Service officer, Mahalakshmi's late brother and Surekha's late husband who gets murdered at the wedding night
- Vidya Pradeep as Radhika, Raja's ex-wife
- Dhanush as himself on Inauguration of Kammath & Kammath hotel in Coimbatore and on wedding eve party.
- Udaykrishna & Sibi K. Thomas as themselves in "Dosa Dosa" song

== Production ==
Mammootty was chosen to play a prominent character. The character of his brother in the film was originally chosen as Jayaram but schedule conflicts led Dileep to replace him. Kunchacko Boban had been approached for guest role of Income tax officer, but he opted out, again due to schedule conflicts and he was replaced by Narain. Dhanush was chosen to play a cameo as a filmstar who comes to Kerala to inaugurate the restaurant. Most of the scenes from the film were shot in Kochi.

== Music ==
Song	Length	Singer(s)	Picturization
"Dosa Nalloru Dosa"		Shankar Mahadevan, M. Jayachandran, Nikhil Raj	
"Ninte Pinnale"		Anwar Saadath	
"Coimbatore Naatile"		Madhu Balakrishnan, Haricharan, Vijay Yesudas	
"Kattadi Kattadi"		Rajesh Krishnan, Sangeetha Sreekanth	

== Release ==
=== Theatrical ===
The film was shown in additional theatres where Vishwaroopam had been banned from being released.

=== Satellite Rights ===
The satellite rights were sold for ₹4.5 crore (US$470,000).

== Reception ==
=== Critical response ===
Paresh C Palicha of Rediff.com rated the film 1.5/5 describing it as an "atrocity on the viewer." IndiaGlitz.com gave 7/10 for the movie and stated "These Kammath brothers are strictly for those who relish masala entertainers" but it gave a positive review of the songs.

Sify.com gave the overall summary of the film as "tedious" and their review says that "only Baburaj manages to make the viewers laugh" and that "There is no credible storyline that is worth mentioning and the script lacks any imagination or depth." The Times of India gave a rating of 3/5 for the movie, stating "Mammootty and Dileep, gifted actors they are, put together their best to salvage what can be called as a sloppy narrative strewn with drab characters."

Dalton L of Deccan Chronicle says "Rather than preparing an action-romcom out of leftovers, the director ought to have demanded an original recipe and organic vegetables. It's very sad to see the great Mammootty unendingly swimming in stale soup."

=== Box office ===
The film had a good collection in the first weekend. Made on a budget of ₹7.5 crore. The film collected ₹10.53 lakhs from five weeks in United Kingdom box office. It collected ₹13.5 crore (US$1.4 million) worldwide. The film got satellite right of ₹4.5 crore (US$470,000).
