= Indian National Cine Academy Awards =

Indian pan-language film awards

- Description: Excellence in Indian cinema across twelve language film industries
- Country: India
- Presented by: Indian National Cine Academy (INCA)
- First award: 2026
- Website: inca.in

The Indian National Cine Academy Awards, commonly known as the INCA Awards, are an annual Indian film awards ceremony presented by the Indian National Cine Academy (INCA), a pan-India academy-style body set up to recognise cinematic excellence across twelve Indian-language film industries. The academy was conceived by producer Vishnu Vardhan Induri, founder of the South Indian International Movie Awards (SIIMA) and the Celebrity Cricket League, and is backed by the Producers Guild of India, which serves as its chief patron. The inaugural edition, presented by Kalyan Jewellers, was held in Mumbai on 15–16 April 2026.

== History ==
INCA was formally announced in early January 2026 as a long-term institutional platform intended to unite India's diverse film industries, proposed by producer Vishnu Vardhan Induri, founder of SIIMA and the Celebrity Cricket League, with the Producers Guild of India joining as chief patron and key institutional partner responsible for governance guidance and coordination with regional film bodies. Producers Guild president Shibasish Sarkar called the academy "an important step towards bringing Indian cinema together on a truly national platform." Induri described the goal as building "a permanent national institution that enables collaboration across industries, celebrates excellence fairly, and builds a universal talent database for Indian cinema."

In February 2026, INCA confirmed the dates of its inaugural ceremony as 15–16 April 2026 in Mumbai and announced Kalyan Jewellers as presenting sponsor of what was subsequently branded the "Kalyan Jewellers INCA Awards".

== Format ==
INCA operates as a two-day event: an "Indian Cinema Conclave" of panel discussions, workshops and masterclasses, followed by the INCA Awards Night. Nominations are drawn from films that release theatrically during the eligibility year and are formally submitted for consideration, and are shortlisted by an INCA jury panel; final winners are then selected by the respective industry bodies representing each of the twelve film industries. The awards span 25 categories in total: four principal awards — Best Film, Best Director, Best Actor and Best Actress — presented separately for each of the twelve languages (Assamese, Bengali, Bhojpuri, Gujarati, Hindi, Kannada, Malayalam, Marathi, Odia, Punjabi, Tamil and Telugu), together with 21 further "All-India" categories recognising performance, direction, music, writing and technical crafts across Indian cinema as a whole, such as Best Debut Director, Best Comedian and Best Visual Effects.

== 2026 (1st edition) ==
The inaugural INCA Awards recognised films released theatrically between January and December 2025. Nominations were announced on 18 March 2026; Dhurandhar led the field with 17 nominations, followed by Lokah Chapter 1: Chandra (15) and Kantara: Chapter 1 and Chhaava (13 each). The ceremony was held in Mumbai on 16 April 2026, preceded by the Indian Cinema Conclave on 15 April. The Awards Night was hosted by Karan Johar and Rana Daggubati; pre-ceremony reports named Rekha and Allu Aravind among the expected guests. Kantara: Chapter 1 swept the Kannada-language awards, winning best film, actor, actress and director.

=== Winners ===
Winners announced across the twelve language industries were:

Language industry	Best Film	Best Actor	Best Actress	Best Director
Assamese	Gulai Soor (Zeng Entertainment, ASFFDC)	Ravi Sarma (Rudra)	Nandinee Kashyap (Rudra)	Raktim Kamal Baruah (Gulai Soor)
Bengali	The Eken: Benaras e Bibhishika (Hoichoi Studios, SVF Entertainment)	Prosenjit Chatterjee (Devi Chowdhurani)	Koushani Mukherjee (Killbill Society)	Annapurna Basu (Sharthopor)
Bhojpuri	Hamar Naam Ba Kanhaiya (Giriraj Production)	Dinesh Lal Yadav (Mere Husband Ki Shaadi Hai)	Amrapali Dubey (Mere Husband Ki Shaadi Hai)	Vishal Verma (Hamar Naam Ba Kanhaiya)
Gujarati	Laalo – Shree Krishna Sada Sahaayate (Manifest Films et al.)	Shruhad Goswami (Laalo – Shree Krishna Sada Sahaayate)	Janki Bodiwala (Vash Level 2)	Ankit Bhupatbhai Sakhiya (Laalo – Shree Krishna Sada Sahaayate)
Hindi	Chhaava (Maddock Films)	Ranveer Singh (Dhurandhar)	Yami Gautam (Haq)	Aditya Dhar (Dhurandhar)
Kannada	Kantara: Chapter 1 (Hombale Films)	Rishab Shetty (Kantara: Chapter 1)	Rukmini Vasanth (Kantara: Chapter 1)	Rishab Shetty (Kantara: Chapter 1)
Malayalam	Lokah Chapter 1: Chandra (Wayfarer Films)	Nivin Pauly (Sarvam Maya)	Kalyani Priyadarshan (Lokah Chapter 1: Chandra)	Dominic Arun (Lokah Chapter 1: Chandra)
Marathi	Sthal (Dhun Productions)	Dilip Prabhavalkar (Dashavatar)	Amruta Subhash (Jarann)	Subodh Khanolkar (Dashavatar)
Odia	Bou Buttu Bhuta (Babushaan Films)	Babushaan Mohanty (Bou Buttu Bhuta)	Archita Sahu (Bou Buttu Bhuta)	Sabyasachi Mohapatra & Kumar C. Dev Mohapatra (Ananta)
Punjabi	Guru Nanak Jahaz (Vehli Janta Films, True Roots Productions)	Tarsem Jassar (Guru Nanak Jahaz)	Sargun Mehta (Sarbala Ji)	Sharan Art (Guru Nanak Jahaz)
Tamil	Tourist Family (Million Dollar Studios, MRP Entertainment)	Dulquer Salmaan (Kaantha)	Simran (Tourist Family)	Mari Selvaraj (Bison Kaalamaadan)
Telugu	Mirai (People Media Factory)	Naga Chaitanya (Thandel)	Rashmika Mandanna (The Girlfriend)	Anil Ravipudi (Sankranthiki Vasthunnam)

Names, titles and production companies without a link do not currently have a dedicated English Wikipedia article.

==== Selected All-India categories ====
Additional pan-industry honours announced included:

Category	Recipient	Film
Best Debut Director	Ram Jagadeesh	Court
Best Comedian	Master Revanth	Sankranthiki Vasthunnam
Best Visual Effects	Mirai	—

== Reception ==
The inaugural edition also drew criticism from within regional film circles. According to NorthEast Now, INCA initially required a ₹6,000 entry-submission fee from producers seeking nomination consideration; the fee was later waived, but some Assamese filmmakers said it had discouraged submissions from the region and raised concerns that early-paying entrants may have been favoured during shortlisting. The report also questioned the inclusion of the film Sri Krishna Leela 2 in acting categories, criticised INCA's decision to award music, writing and technical-craft honours collectively across all languages rather than separately for each industry, and noted that INCA's social-media promotion of Assamese actor Kula Kuldip's nomination (for Collage) had mistakenly used another performer's photograph. Of more than 20 Assamese theatrical releases in 2025, the report noted, only seven received INCA nominations.

== See also ==
- South Indian International Movie Awards
- Filmfare Awards
- National Film Awards (India)
