= Thandel =

2025 Indian Telugu film by Chandoo Mondeti

- Theatrical release poster
- Directed by: Chandoo Mondeti
- Written by: Chandoo Mondeti; Kartheek Theeda
- Produced by: Bunny Vasu
- Starring: Naga Chaitanya; Sai Pallavi
- Cinematography: Shamdat
- Edited by: Naveen Nooli
- Music by: Devi Sri Prasad
- Production company: Geetha Arts
- Distributed by: see below
- Release date: 7 February 2025
- Running time: 151 minutes
- Country: India
- Language: Telugu
- Budget: ₹75–90 crore
- Box office: ₹100 crore

Thandel (lit. 'Captain of the boat') is a 2025 Indian Telugu-language romantic action thriller film written and directed by Chandoo Mondeti. Produced by Bunny Vasu under Geetha Arts, and starring Naga Chaitanya and Sai Pallavi. The film is based on a real-life incident that occurred in 2018, depicting how Pakistani forces captured a fisherman from Srikakulam in international waters.

This film marks Chandoo's third collaboration with Chaitanya, and was initially tentatively titled NC23 (meaning Chaitanya's 23rd film). It was officially announced in November 2023 and filming began in December of the same year. Filming locations included Visakhapatnam, Srikakulam, Mangaluru, Udupi, and Hyderabad. The film's score was composed by Devi Sri Prasad. Shamdat and Navin Nooli were responsible for the film's cinematography and editing, respectively.

Thandel was initially scheduled to be released in January 2025, on the occasion of Sankranthi, but was postponed. The film was released in theatres on 7 February 2025 to mixed reviews from critics, who praised the lead cast's performance, visuals and soundtrack, while the narration received criticism. Despite the criticism, it is a commercial success at the box office. The film has grossed over ₹100 crores worldwide and is the tenth highest-grossing Telugu film of 2025.

== Plot ==
Raju is a brave fisherman from Matchilesam, a village near Srikakulam. Like his late father, he has a natural talent for leadership and became the "Thandel" of the fishing boat. Raju and Sathya have been in love since childhood, and he always spends time with her after returning to the village from fishing trips. Sathya was very worried about Rajo's dangerous life at sea and hoped he could find safer work so they could have a peaceful future. But the sea was already in Rajo's blood, and he felt he couldn't let go. So, despite Sathya's advice, he went out to sea again with his fishing friends.

Raju and his crew encountered a sudden storm at sea and rescued several Pakistani fishermen, but they also accidentally entered Pakistani waters. Raju and 22 other fishermen were arrested by the Pakistani Navy and temporarily imprisoned before their trial. In India, Sathya was heartbroken and decided to marry Murali, a debt collector from her village. Even after learning about Raju and the others' situation, Sathya did not give up on him. She first helped Raju and others recover their owed wages from their fishing bosses, and then she traveled around pleading with the fishermen's families to ask the Indian government to bring back their families stranded in Pakistan. Meanwhile, Raju and others were humiliated by Pakistani thugs in prison.

With the assistance of the Foreign Minister, Raju and his entourage were finally able to be repatriated to India. On August 5, 2019, Article 370 of the Constitution of India was promulgated, leading to large-scale protests in Kashmir and Pakistan. The petition filed by Raju and 22 other fishermen was nullified, leaving them unable to return home and remain in prison. Meanwhile, the Foreign Minister has passed away.

With her wedding day approaching, Sathya went to Delhi to persuade the Foreign Minister's daughter to help Raju and the others be repatriated. Unexpectedly, one of the 22 fishermen could not be released due to insufficient identification documents. Raju was heartbroken to learn from his partner Lingayya that Sathya was getting married. Raju decided to stay where he was until everyone could return to India. As a result, thanks to the efforts of the Indian Embassy, they were finally able to be repatriated. Murali helped Sathya along the way and felt the love between Sathya and Raju, so he gave up the marriage and bought a plane ticket to send Raju back home. After returning to the village, Raju reunited with Sathya at the lighthouse, and the two embraced each other excitedly.

== Cast ==
- Naga Chaitanya as Raju
  - Aakash Srinivas as Young Thandel
- Sai Pallavi as Koracha Sathya "Bujji Thalli"
  - Baby Sridevi as Young Sathya
- Aadukalam Naren as Lingayya
- Divya Pillai as Chandra
- Karunakaran as Manapuram Murali
- Kalpa Latha as Gowramma, Raju's mother
- Babloo Prithiveeraj as Koracha Somayya, Sathya's father
- Harsha Chemudu as Rambabu
- Prakash Belawadi as Jailer
- Charandeep as Suribabu
- Parvateesam as Eswar
- Sundip R Ved as Rakeem
- Mahesh Achanta as Lakshman
- Nithin Prasanna as Sub-jailer
- Reddi Bhanu Prasad as Sentri
- Kishore Raju Vasistha as Indian Soldier
- Chitram Basha as Senior Sentri
- Vadlamani Srinivas as Minister
- Naga Mahesh as Local Contractor
- Abhinav Singh Raghav as PA to External Foreign Minister

== Themes ==
Thandel is adapted from a true story from 2018, recounting the harrowing experience of Srikakulam fishermen who were swept into Pakistani waters by waves during a routine fishing operation. They strayed into Pakistani waters and were eventually arrested. Allu Aravind of Geetha Arts contacted the 20 people who had served time in Pakistani prisons and obtained their authorization.

Naga Chaitanya spent time with these fishermen, experiencing their plight firsthand, which fueled his passion for the film. He praised the bravery of his fellow fishermen who played a crucial role in the rescue operation and highlighted the love story that runs throughout the film. He added: "This film doesn’t go in that Indo-Pak or patriotism zone much. We aren’t focusing on the political conflict between the two countries. Instead, our film is more about how this conflict affects the release of the prisoners, who are the primary characters here." The title Thandel means "Captain of the boat", referring to the leader of the entire crew.

Post the release of the TV show Arabia Kadali, in August 2025, Satyadev issued a clarification related to the similarity of story with the film. The pre-production work of the series began in 2023 and it took time for the team to get approval from Amazon Prime Video and to design the screenplay in an episode-wise format.

== Production ==
=== Development ===
From June to mid-September 2023, after the release of Custody (2023), rumors circulated that Chaitanya would star in Chandoo Mondeti's next film. The film is based on a true story, and Chaitanya will play a fisherman. On September 20, 2023, the production company announced that Sai Pallavi would be collaborating with Chaitanya again after the film Love Story (2021). At this time, the film is tentatively titled NC23 (This symbolizes Chaitanya's 23rd film). This film will be directed by Chandoo Mondeti. Chandoo Mondeti and Naga Chaitanya previously collaborated at Premam (2016) and Savyasachi (2018). The project, named Thandel, was announced on November 22, 2023, and the film was produced by Allu Aravind's Geetha Arts. Devi Sri Prasad will compose the music for this film. According to reports, this project had been shelved by Geetha Arts for a long time. When Chaitanya learned of this, he proactively expressed his interest in participating to producer Bunny Vasu. Allu Aravind stated that the complete script took nine months to write.

=== Casting ===
In Thandel, Chaitanya departs from his previous urban boy-next-door image, sporting long hair and a beard, wearing simple clothing, and even learning the Srikakulam dialect. According to reports, Chaitanya's salary for this film is as high as ₹15 to 20 crore, a significant increase compared to the ₹10 crore he received for his previous films. Pallavi plays Chaitanya's lover. She said that this film allowed her to "play a role rooted in the land like a fisherman for the first time," and that she learned the Srikankulam dialect, just like Chaitanya. She also received training in net casting and other boat activities. This film marks the second collaboration between Chaitanya and Pallavi; Chaitanya praised working with Pallavi as "always an amazing experience". Sundip R Ved plays the villain in the film. Other actors in the film include Aadukalam Naren, Charandeep, and Mahesh Achanta.

=== Filming ===
Filming for Thandel will begin in late December 2023 at Udupi. The film crew also shot this movie in Mangaluru. According to a report on February 6, 2024, the production team completed two major filming phases. In March 2024, the crew filmed on set in Hyderabad. The crew completed filming in Visakhapatnam and Srikakulam in June 2024, at which point filming was nearing its end. A dance sequence in the film on Lord Shiva, "Namo Namah Shivaya", was shot with a budget of ₹4 crores where 900 trained dancers worked for the song.

== Music ==
The music of the film is composed by Devi Sri Prasad. The main soundtrack has four songs and additional two songs in the extended soundtrack.

== Marketing ==
In 6 January 2024, the production company released a two-minute short film titled Essence of Thandel, which, in addition to introducing the characters, also revealed a synopsis of the film's story. The production company released a teaser in January 2025. The teaser's theme was showcased as "duty, love, and sacrifice," with the tagline: "The one who anchors his crew, his love, and his people; and won't care to sacrifice his life." The trailer for this film was released on 28 January 2025. On January 31, 2025, the film's production company held a trailer launch event in Mumbai, where Aamir Khan also attended to support the film.

== Release ==
=== Theatrical ===
Initially the film was planned for a Sankranthi festival release in January 2025. Due to some difficulties in shooting permissions and also for uncompromised quality of making, the makers have opted for 7 February 2025 in original Telugu and also dubbed in Tamil and Hindi languages. However, a high-definition version was leaked online on the day of the premiere. The production company held a press conference and announced that it would take strict legal action against those who distribute pirated copies of the film online. However, Bunny Vasu later expressed regret in March 2025 for holding a press conference to discuss piracy during theatrical release, which inadvertently made many viewers aware of the existence of piracy and exacerbated the problem.

=== Distribution ===
Geetha Arts is independently responsible for the distribution of this film in the Telugu region. The Tamil dubbed version for Tamil Nadu distributed by S. R. Prakashbabu and S. R. Prabhu under Dream Warrior Pictures. The Hindi dubbed version for North India distributed by Jayantilal Gada under Pen Marudhar. The film's distribution in the UK was handled by Prathyangira Cinemas.

=== Home media ===
The satellite rights were acquired by Zee Telugu, while the post-theatrical streaming rights were acquired by Netflix for ₹40–45 crore. This sets a new record for the highest streaming rights payment to date for a film starring Chaitanya. The film was released on Netflix on 7 March 2025, and is available in Telugu, Hindi, Tamil, Kannada, and Malayalam.

== Reception ==
=== Box office ===
On its opening day, Thandel grossed ₹13.9 crore (US$1.4 million) in the Telugu region, bringing its global total to approximately ₹20.4 crore (US$2.1 million), with a net income of ₹11.5 crore (US$1.2 million), setting a new career high for Chaitanya. The film grossed approximately ₹72.6 crore (US$7.5 million) in its opening week, with a net box office of ₹41.5 crore (US$4.3 million). The film grossed approximately ₹88.3 crore (US$9.2 million) worldwide in its first two weeks (14 days) of release, with a net box office of ₹50.8 crore (US$5.3 million). By the end of March, when the film's theatrical run ended, it had grossed a total of ₹100 crore (US$10 million) worldwide, with a net income of ₹54 crore (US$5.6 million), marking a box office success; its overseas performance was also excellent. Thandel marks Chaitanya's first starring film to enter the 100 Crore Club. This film became the tenth highest-grossing Telugu-language film of 2025.

=== Critical response ===
Thandel met with generally mixed reviews from critics.

Paul Nicodemus of The Times of India gave 3.5/5 stars and wrote, "Thandel is an engaging romantic action drama that delivers on its promise. While there are moments where the narrative could have been tighter, the film’s decent storytelling, moving music, stunning visuals and brilliant lead performances ensure it leaves an impact. If you’re looking for an intense love story with drama, action, and a touch of patriotism, Thandel is worth a watch." Avad Mohammad of OTTPlay gave 3.5/5 stars and wrote, "On the whole, Thandel is a deeply moving romantic drama, elevated by outstanding performances from Naga Chaitanya and Sai Pallavi. The emotionally gripping narrative keeps you engaged until the very end, making it a must-watch this weekend. Highly recommended." Rachit Gupta of Filmfare gave 3.5/5 stars and wrote, "DSP's music and Shamdat Sainudeen's cinematography are highlights of Thandel. Together the music and visuals of this film are at par with any international production one may have seen. But director Chandoo Mondeti's direction and the screenplay don't always convince you of the epic that's unfolding on screen."

Arjun Menon of Rediff.com gave 2.5/5 stars and wrote, "The reluctance to own the romantic tragedy at the heart for superficial thrills prevents Thandel from truly rising." Avinash Ramachandran of The Indian Express gave 2.5/5 stars and wrote, "But the fact that there was space for just one love story to bloom rather than 22 life stories to come to life is why Thandel is a lovely romance that doesn’t go all the way because it falls short of becoming an effective drama."

Sangeetha Devi Dundoo of The Hindu believes that the performances of the two leads and the romance almost overshadow the film's shortcomings: "Yet, despite its flaws, it remains an engaging watch, carried by its deeply empathetic love story." Neeshita Nyayapati of Hindustan Times praised Chaitanya's performance, saying that even in the film's somewhat weaker segments, his acting still captivated the audience. On the contrary, she felt that Pallavi's performance was not as good as Chaitanya's.

== Accolades ==
Award	Date of Issuance	Category	Recipient	Result	Ref.
Indian National Cine Academy Awards	15–16 April 2026	Best Actor (Telugu)	Naga Chaitanya	Won	
Telangana Gaddar Film Awards	19 March 2026	Best Actor	Naga Chaitanya	Won	
Telangana Gaddar Film Awards	19 March 2026	National Integration film	Thandel	Won	
South Indian International Movie Awards	12–13 September 2026	Best Film – Telugu	Thandel	Nominated	
South Indian International Movie Awards	12–13 September 2026	Best Director – Telugu	Chandoo Mondeti	Nominated	
South Indian International Movie Awards	12–13 September 2026	Best Cinematographer – Telugu	Shamdat	Nominated	
South Indian International Movie Awards	12–13 September 2026	Best Actor – Telugu	Naga Chaitanya	Won	
South Indian International Movie Awards	12–13 September 2026	Best Actress – Telugu	Sai Pallavi	Nominated	
South Indian International Movie Awards	12–13 September 2026	Best Music Director – Telugu	Devi Sri Prasad	Nominated	
South Indian International Movie Awards	12–13 September 2026	Best Lyricist – Telugu	Sri Mani—"Bujji Thalli"	Nominated	
South Indian International Movie Awards	12–13 September 2026	Best Male Playback Singer – Telugu	Javed Ali—"Bujji Thalli"	Nominated	
South Indian International Movie Awards	12–13 September 2026	Best Female Playback Singer – Telugu	Shreya Ghoshal—"Hilesso Hilessa"	Nominated	
South Indian International Movie Awards	12–13 September 2026	Critics choice awards for Best Director – Telugu	Chandoo Mondeti	Won	
