= Karthika Nair =

Indian actress (born 1992)

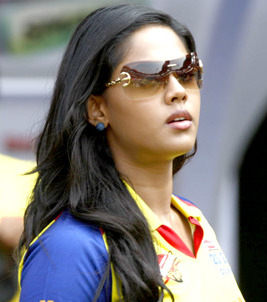
- Karthika at CCL
- Born: 27 June 1992 (age 34); Thiruvananthapuram, Kerala, India
- Citizenship: Indian
- Occupation: Actress
- Years active: 2009–2017
- Spouse: Rohit Menon (m. 2023)
- Parent(s): Radha; Rajasekaran Nair
- Relatives: Thulasi Nair (sister)

Karthika Nair (born 27 June 1992) is a former Indian actress who primarily worked down South in all language films. She made her debut in the 2009 Telugu film Josh, opposite Naga Chaitanya. She rose to fame starring in her second and her first successful Tamil film Ko, opposite Jiiva and Piaa Bajpai. She found further success in the Malayalam film Proprietors: Kammath & Kammath, opposite Dileep.

== Early and personal life ==
Karthika was born to former Indian actress Radha. She has a brother and a sister, Thulasi Nair, who is also a South Indian actress. She did her schooling in Podar International School in Mumbai and earned a degree in business from a London School of Economics-affiliated college.

Karthika Nair married Rohit Menon in Udai Samudra Leisure Beach Hotel, Thiruvananthapuram, Kerala on 19 November 2023.

== Career ==
She made her acting debut at the age of 17 in the 2009 Telugu film Josh, opposite Naga Chaitanya. Though the film received mixed reviews, her performance as Vidya, an elementary school teacher desperate to attend college was received well. Her second movie was in Tamil, called Ko, directed by K. V. Anand, with Jiiva and Piaa Bajpai in lead roles, which did very well at the box office. The film received cult status in the genre of political thrillers. Her performance as Renuka Narayanan, an investigative journalist, who exposes the blunders of politicians was hugely applauded. She then appeared in the Malayalam film Makaramanju, directed by Lenin Rajendran, starring alongside ace cinematographer and director Santosh Sivan. She donned a dual role, one of a painting model, Sugandha Bai and Urvashi, the Celestial beauty. Her first-ever dual role was well received and critics raved about her performance.

In 2012, she appeared in a single Telugu film Dammu, directed by Boyapati Srinu, in a limited glamorous role. Her performance and the movie received mixed reviews and ended up being a commercial failure. She was paired with N. T. Rama Rao Jr. and shared screen space with Trisha.

In 2013, she appeared in the comedy film Proprietors: Kammath & Kammath, alongside Mammootty and Dileep. Her performance as Surekha, a mute Christian young widow who works in Indian Revenue Service was well received and so is the film. Later, she appeared in the title role in the Tamil film Annakodi, directed by legendary filmmaker Bharathiraja. Though the film received negative reviews, her performance as a damsel in distress received positive response. She made her Kannada debut with Brindavana, a remake of Telugu blockbuster Brindavanam. The film repeated the success of the original. In the film, she was paired with Darshan.

In 2014, she appeared in her third Telugu film Brother of Bommali, where she played Lucky, the streetwise tomboy twin sister of Allari Naresh's character. The film also starred Monal Gajjar. In the film, she has donned a full-length comic role.

In 2015, she appeared in her third Tamil Political crime drama film Purampokku Engira Podhuvudamai, directed by National Film Award winner S. P. Jananathan, alongside Arya, Vijay Sethupathi and Shaam. As part of her role, she learned how to ride a motorcycle. Her performance as Kuyili, a mastermind behind a prison break plan received a positive response. The film received commercial success and critical acclaim. Her portrayal of Kuyili is cited as a complete deprival of regular commercial heroine characterizations.

Her much delayed film Vaa Deal, starring Arun Vijay is yet to be released.

=== Television ===
In the year 2017, Karthika made her Television debut after retiring from movies, since 2015 with the Epic drama Aarambh, written by V. Vijayendra Prasad and directed by Goldie Behl, which aired on Star Plus, starring opposite Rajneesh Duggal. In the series, she played Devasena, a warrior queen, which was well received by both audience and critics. The show aired its last episode on 10 September 2017.

== Filmography ==
Films

Year	Movie	Role	Language	Notes
2009	Josh	Vidhya	Telugu	CineMAA Awards – Best Female Debut – Won
2011	Ko	Renuka Narayanan	Tamil	
2011	Makaramanju	Sugandha Bai / Urvashi	Malayalam	
2012	Dammu	Neelaveni	Telugu	
2013	Proprietors: Kammath & Kammath	Surekha	Malayalam	
2013	Annakodi	Annakodi	Tamil	
2013	Brindavana	Bhoomi	Kannada	
2014	Brother of Bommali	Mahalakshmi / Lucky	Telugu	Filmfare Awards South - Best Actress- Nominated
2015	Purampokku Engira Podhuvudamai	Kuyili	Tamil	

Television

Year	Title	Role	Language	Notes	Ref.
2017	Aarambh: Kahaani Devsena Ki	Devasena	Hindi	Television debut	
