= Josh (2009 Telugu film) =

- Theatrical release poster
- Directed by: Vasu Varma
- Produced by: Dil Raju
- Starring: Naga Chaitanya; Karthika; J. D. Chakravarthy; Prakash Raj; Sunil
- Cinematography: Sameer Reddy
- Edited by: Marthand K. Venkatesh
- Music by: Sandeep Chowta
- Production company: Sri Venkateswara Creations
- Distributed by: Sri Venkateswara Creations
- Release date: 5 September 2009
- Running time: 169 minutes
- Country: India
- Language: Telugu

Josh (transl. zeal) is a 2009 Indian Telugu-language coming-of-age political action drama film directed by Vasu Varma in his debut, and produced Dil Raju. The film marks the debuts of Naga Chaitanya (son of Nagarjuna) and Karthika (daughter of Radha) in lead roles, whilst prominent actor J. D. Chakravarthy plays antagonist role. The film's music is scored by Sandeep Chowta.

The plot explores student politics, and the vested interests of politicians in such activities. Released on 5 September 2009, to highly positive reviews for its direction, emotional weight of the story, screenplay, Chaitanya & Prakash Raj's performance, soundtrack & social message, but received criticism for its lengthy runtime. Despite receiving positive reviews, film was not commercially successful.

Over the years, the film attained cult following among the youth.

== Plot ==
Satya (Naga Chaitanya) leaves his graduation studies in Vizag and moves to Hyderabad for work, staying with his uncle (Sunil) and finding a job at a nursery. He meets Vidhya (Karthika Nair), a 17-year-old convent teacher who wants to attend college but is prevented by her brother Harshavardhan aka Harshad (Harshavardhan), who runs a cafe near a college and believes its students are dangerous. Satya and Vidhya become friends through frequent encounters and eventually fall in love.

Satya becomes a witness in a case against students of MGM College for destroying public property. Influenced by their former student J Durga Rao aka JD (JD Chakravarthy), the students threaten Satya and destroy his uncle's flat. Rather than leave Hyderabad, Satya withdraws the case and enrols at MGM College, intending to reform its students. He challenges a professor who merely copies textbook material and humiliates senior basketball champion Suresh Kumar by exposing his inability to score. Meanwhile, rival student groups led by Guna and Radha, with Guna regarding JD as a brother, unite against Satya. After Guna's gang beats him, Satya is hospitalised. When his uncle asks why he hates the students, Satya replies that he does not hate them but pities them, and recounts his past.

As a schoolboy, Satya was a topper, but college turned him into a reckless and stubborn student. His principal (Prakash Raj) repeatedly urged him to change, but Satya dismissed his advice. He became obsessed with bike racing and brought the principal's sincere son, Bujji, into his circle. In response to Satya's behaviour, the principal proposes a DISCO (Discipline Committee). Satya undermines it by speaking about student suicides and mental pressure, winning the students' support. The principal nevertheless tells him that his talent could lead to great things if he changed.

Satya ignores the warning and goes bike racing with Bujji. When the bike's chain comes loose, it crashes, injuring Satya and killing Bujji. Overcome with guilt, Satya leaves the college and city. Although Bujji's father forgives him, Satya cannot accept the forgiveness, believing that students like him cause others to suffer. He therefore resolves to reform students like himself. He believes their behaviour stems either from college environments or their age, but that student ego prevents them from accepting advice. He concludes that this same ego allows figures such as JD to control them, and that the only way to reform students is to use their ego against them before calming it. Satya hopes that some students will eventually question his actions and wants to prevent others from enduring the punishment he believes he deserves.

Satya returns to MGM College while its students attend a rally supporting JD's bid to become a youth leader. Radha's group challenges him to a basketball match against Suresh Kumar: if Satya loses, they may do anything to him; if he wins, Suresh Kumar will be expelled. Satya deliberately loses, a decision known only to Suresh. Meanwhile, Guna is beaten by JD for refusing to join the rally. Realising Guna is in danger, Satya warns his friend. Suresh confirms JD's threat, revealing that JD once caused him to become addicted to drugs, destroying his career. He has remained at the college because he cannot answer his friends' questions about his life and urges the students to follow Satya.

Guna escapes JD's men and calls out Satya's name, prompting the students to unite against JD. Satya insists on confronting JD alone, fights him and his men, and drives JD out of the college.

In the post-credits scene, Vidhya joins MGM College after its students behave well towards Harshad, causing him to overcome his fear of them.

== Cast ==
- Naga Chaitanya as Satya
- Karthika as Vidhya
- J. D. Chakravarthy as J. Durga Rao
- Prakash Raj as Principal
- Brahmanandam as Durga Rao's personal assistant
- Sunil as Bujji, Satya’s uncle
- Anand as Satya's father
- Sithara as Satya's mother
- Surya
- Hema
- Janaki Sabesh
- Harsha Vardhan as Harshavardhan AKA Harshad, Vidhya's brother
- Devadas Kanakala
- Kautilya as Guna
- Kamesh
- Mounica as Vidhya's sister-in-law
- Shreya Dhanwanthary as Bhavna, student of MGM college and Satya’s classmate
- Rakesh Varre as Radha
- Sandeep Madhav as a student (Radha batch)
- Siddhu Jonnalagadda as a student
- Vishwa
- Pila Gangadhar
- Priyanka
- Sai Kundana
- Asalatha
- Kotesh Manava
- Satyanarayana Varma

== Soundtrack ==
Josh

Soundtrack album by Sandeep Chowtha
- Released: 18 July 2009
- Recorded: 2009
- Genre: Film soundtrack
- Label: Aditya Music
- Producer: Dil Raju

Sandeep Chowtha chronology
Bujjigaadu (2008)	Josh (2009)	Saleem (2009)

The music was composed by Sandeep Chowtha. The soundtrack, released on 18 July 2009 at Shilparama Vedika.

No.	Title	Lyrics	Artist(s)	Length
1.	"Diridiri Diridi"	Seetharama Sastry	Sandeep Chowtha, Kunal Ganjawala	4:49
2.	"Neetho Vunte"	Seetharama Sastry	Karthik	5:26
3.	"Jigijikka" (Bit Song)	Chandrabose	Chandrabose	1:13
4.	"Aawara Hawa"	Seetharama Sastry	Sowmya Raoh	4:24
5.	"Bad Bad Boy"	Seetharama Sastry	Ranjith	4:40
6.	"Annayochinado" (Bit Song)	Chandrabose	Dil Raju	0:52
7.	"Evvariki"	Seetharama Sastry	Rahul Vaidya, Ujjaini Mukherjee	4:58
8.	"Me Me Meka" (Bit Song)	Chandrabose	Chandrabose	0:57
9.	"College Bulloda"	Chandrabose	Rahul Sipligunj	3:47

== Release ==
Initially scheduled to release on 3 September 2009, the film was delayed due to the death of Andhra Pradesh Chief Minister Y. S. Rajasekhara Reddy. It was eventually released two days later on 5 September 2009.

== Reception ==
Josh received highly positive reviews upon its release and was praised for its direction, emotional weight of the story, screenplay, Chaitanya & Prakash Raj's performance, soundtrack & social message, but criticised its runtime.Rediff.com critic Radhika Rajmani wrote, "Josh as such, does not have anything new about it. The theme has been touched upon before. The attraction now is Naga Chaitanya who has the movie on his shoulders," while rating the film 3 stars of 5. Idlebrain.com rated 2.75/5 and stated, "The narration and screenplay given by Vasu Varma diluted the main point."

== Accolades ==
Filmfare Awards South

- Won – Filmfare Award for Best Male Debut – South – Naga Chaitanya

Santosham Film Awards

- Won – Santosham Film Award for Best Debut Actress – Karthika Nair

CineMAA Awards

- Won – Best Male Debut - Naga Chaitanya
- Won – Best Female Debut – Karthika Nair
