= 100% Love (2011 film) =

2011 Indian film by Sukumar

- Theatrical release poster
- Directed by: Sukumar
- Written by: M. J. Saikumar; T. Ramesh
- Screenplay by: Jakka Hari Prasad
- Story by: Sukumar
- Produced by: Bunny Vasu
- Starring: Naga Chaitanya; Tamannaah Bhatia
- Cinematography: Venkat Rama Prasad
- Edited by: Karthika Srinivas
- Music by: Devi Sri Prasad
- Distributed by: Geetha Arts
- Release date: 6 May 2011
- Running time: 140 minutes
- Country: India
- Language: Telugu
- Box office: ₹18 crore distributors' share

100% Love is a 2011 Indian Telugu-language romantic comedy film directed by Sukumar and produced by Bunny Vasu under the banner Geetha Arts. The film stars Naga Chaitanya and Tamannaah Bhatia with music composed by Devi Sri Prasad. It revolves around Balu and Mahalakshmi, cross-cousins who share a love–hate relationship.

100% Love was theatrically released worldwide on 6 May 2011, and was critically acclaimed. The film was a commercial success and won two Nandi Awards. It was remade in Bengali as Prem Ki Bujhini (2016), and in Tamil as 100% Kadhal (2019).

== Plot ==
The narrative opens in a local bar, where a young man named Balu enters wearing traditional wedding attire and orders a drink. When two patrons question why he is avoiding his own wedding, Balu displays his analytical mind by rapidly calculating their complex financial debts. Intrigued, the patrons ask him to explain his situation, prompting Balu to recount the events leading to his current predicament.

Balu is an exceptionally intelligent student who consistently tops his college. His life alters when his cross-cousin, Veera Venkata Satya Sai Naga Durga Sesha Avathara Seetha Mahalakshmi, moves into his household to pursue her higher education. Upon meeting, she is instantly awed by Balu's intellect, though Balu comically refuses to memorize her exceptionally long full name, shortening it simply to Mahalakshmi. Following her first examination, Mahalakshmi breaks down in tears due to her inability to comprehend English. Balu steps in to tutor her, but his assistance backfires when Mahalakshmi secures the top rank in the next exam, relegating Balu to second place. Deeply wounded in his pride, Balu covertly schemes to sabotage her future studies, and a competitive Mahalakshmi retaliates in kind. Their academic warfare allows a third student, Ajith, to swoop in and claim the top rank.

When Mahalakshmi's father arranges an unwanted marriage alliance for her, the cousins call a truce. They strike a deal: Balu successfully orchestrates the cancellation of the wedding proposal, while Mahalakshmi agrees to distract Ajith to destroy his academic focus. As they study closely together, Balu finds himself increasingly attracted to her. The strategy succeeds; Balu reclaims the first rank and is awarded a residential building by his principal. However, during the housewarming celebration, Mahalakshmi casually praises Ajith's intellect, noting that he still performed remarkably well despite her heavy distractions. Balu's massive ego is shattered by the implication that another man could be superior to him, causing a severe emotional rift that drives the pair apart.

Three years pass before the cousins cross paths again at a hospital following their grandmother's sudden illness. Mahalakshmi quickly realizes that Balu remains as stubborn and ego-driven as ever. When their respective parents attempt to salvage the relationship by arranging their marriage, Balu abruptly lies, claiming he is already in a committed relationship with a successful woman named Swapna. Disheartened and seeking retaliatory validation, Mahalakshmi agrees to marry Ajith, who has since become a highly prosperous corporate executive outearning Balu.

Both couples get engaged to their respective partners. However, their ailing grandmother expresses a final wish for Balu and Mahalakshmi to visit their grandfather in his village. Persuaded by their uncle, John Acharya, the hostile cousins agree to the journey under the pseudonyms Shahrukh and Kajol to maintain peace. They successfully dupe the grandfather into believing they are marrying, while cleverly convincing him not to attend the actual city weddings to prevent the ruse from collapsing.

Driven by a desperate need to surpass Ajith, Balu takes massive financial risks with his corporate firm. His business partner betrays him, leaving Balu on the brink of bankruptcy. Learning of his impending ruin, Mahalakshmi steps in as his project manager, working tirelessly to salvage his enterprise. Their seamless professional synergy saves the company. During the subsequent victory party, Balu publicly credits Mahalakshmi for the turnaround, but she inadvertently bruises his ego once more with a casual remark. Unable to contain his emotions, Balu confesses that his lifelong obsession with superiority stemmed entirely from his desire to look grand in her eyes because he loved her. When Mahalakshmi admits she reciprocates his love, Balu’s deep-seated insecurities prevent him from believing her, leading him to flee to the bar.

Back in the present, the grandfather suddenly enters the bar, revealing he had followed Balu and understood the entire situation. Confronted by his grandfather and forced to cut through his pride, Balu finally accepts Mahalakshmi's sincerity. The cousins cast aside their competitive armor, confess their mutual love, and finally unite.

== Cast ==
- Naga Chaitanya as Veera Bahu Sathya Dharma Siva Sankara Rama Balu Mahendra (Balu)
- Tamannaah Bhatia as Veera Venkata Satya Sai Naga Durga Sesha Avathara Seetha Mahalakshmi (Mahalakshmi)
- Vijayakumar as Balu Mahendra, Balu and Mahalakshmi's grandfather
- K. R. Vijaya as Mahalakshmi, Balu and Mahalakshmi's grandmother
- Naresh as Ramesh, Balu's father
- Dharmavarapu Subramanyam as John Acharya, Balu and Mahalakhsmi's uncle
- M. S. Narayana as Ramana, the college dean
- Nandu as Ajith Jogi (credited as Anand)
- I. S. Giridhar as Mahalaksmi's father
- Tara Alisha Berry as Swapna
- Pradeep Machiraju As Balu's friend
- Satyam Rajesh As Shyamala, Mahalakshmi's groom to be
- Dr. Rammohanreddy
- Kittayya

=== Cameo appearance ===
- Meghna Naidu in the song "Diyalo Diyala"
- Maryam Zakaria in the song "Diyalo Diyala"
- Chitram Srinu
- Thagubothu Ramesh

== Production ==
Before the completion of Arya 2, Sukumar had discussed making the film with Geetha Arts with Varun Sandesh and Tamannaah Bhatia, but the film failed to materialize. February 2010, the project was announced with a statement reporting the collaboration of Geetha Arts, Sukumar and Naga Chaitanya for the film mentioned. The subsequent month saw Tamannaah announce that she had signed on to portray the lead female role in the project. The film was launched at Annapoorna Studios, Hyderabad on 8 June 2010 with several leading Telugu film personalities being involved with the event. Noted producer D. Ramanaidu rendered the launch, another producer Nagababu switched on the camera and Naga Chaitanya's father actor Nagarjuna clapped the first shot. The formal first shot direction was done by S. S. Rajamouli and Akkineni Nageswara Rao handed over the script to the director.

The film continued its shoot untitled officially until 20 March 2011 when the title 100% Love was formally announced. During the production of the film, several titles were reported in the media for the project including Balu Weds Mahalakshmi, I Love You, I Love You Mahalakshmi, I Hate Mahalakshmi and I am Number One. Despite having an original planned release of December 2010, strikes if the industry pushed the release date to April 2011.

== Music ==
The music and background score was composed by Sukumar's regular associate Devi Sri Prasad. The album consisted of 8 songs which included 2 bit songs in the first release and 2 another bit songs in the next release. Chandrabose, Ramajogayya Sastry and Sri Mani penned the Lyrics. The album was released on 2 April 2011 at Rock Gardens in Hyderabad in a star-studded promotional event on Aditya Music label, with the audio being launched by Nagarjuna, Allu Arjun and Ram Pothineni. Upon release, 100% Love received positive response from critics as well as audience thus making it one of the best selling soundtracks of the year 2011.

== Reception ==
The film is said to be the only film of Naga Chaitanya after Ye Maaya Chesave and for Sukumar after Arya, completing 50 days in 65 centres in Andhra. The film completed its 100th day theatrical run on 13 August 2011.

== Accolades ==
Nandi Awards

- Best Child Actor - Master Nikhil
- Best Home - Viewing Feature Film - Bunny Vasu

CineMAA Awards

- Won - Best Actress - Tamannaah Bhatia

TSR - TV9 National Film Awards

- Won - Best Heroine - Tamannaah Bhatia

Hyderabad Times Film Awards

- Won - Best Actress - Tamannaah Bhatia

59th Filmfare Awards South

- Nominated - Best Film – Telugu - Geetha Arts/Bunny Vasu
- Nominated - Best Director – Telugu - Sukumar
- Nominated - Best Actress – Telugu - Tamannaah Bhatia
- Nominated - Best Music Director – Telugu - Devi Sri Prasad
- Nominated - Best Female Playback Singer – Telugu - Swathi Reddy – "A Square B Square"

1st South Indian International Movie Awards

- Nominated - Best Film (Telugu) - Geetha Arts/Bunny Vasu
- Nominated - Best Director (Telugu) - Sukumar
- Nominated - Best Cinematographer (Telugu) - Venkat Prasad
- Nominated - Best Actor (Telugu) - Naga Chaitanya
- Nominated - Best Actress (Telugu) - Tamannaah Bhatia
- Nominated - Best Music Director (Telugu) - Devi Sri Prasad
- Nominated - Best Lyricist (Telugu) - Chandrabose – "Infatuation"
- Nominated - Best Male Playback Singer (Telugu) - Adnan Sami – "Infatuation"
- Nominated - Best Female Playback Singer (Telugu) - Swathi Reddy – "A Square B Square"
