= Shailaja Reddy Alludu =

- Theatrical release poster
- Directed by: Maruthi
- Written by: Maruthi
- Produced by: Suryadevara Naga Vamsi; P. D. V. Prasad
- Starring: Naga Chaitanya; Anu Emmanuel; Ramya Krishna
- Cinematography: Nizar Shafi
- Edited by: Kotagiri Venkateswara Rao
- Music by: Gopi Sundar
- Production company: Sithara Entertainments
- Release date: 13 September 2018
- Running time: 140 minutes
- Country: India
- Language: Telugu
- Budget: ₹24 crore
- Box office: ₹37 crore

Shailaja Reddy Alludu (transl. Shailaja Reddy's son-in-law) is a 2018 Indian Telugu-language romantic comedy film written and directed by Maruthi and produced by Suryadevara Naga Vamsi and P. D. V. Prasad, under Sithara Entertainments. It starred Naga Chaitanya, Anu Emmanuel and Ramya Krishna while Naresh, Murali Sharma, and Vennela Kishore appear in supporting roles. The music was composed by Gopi Sundar with cinematography done by Nizar Shafi and editing by Kotagiri Venkateswara Rao. The film released worldwide on 13 September 2018 to mixed reviews and grossed over ₹37 crore at the box office.

== Plot ==
Chaitanya "Chaitu" is the son of an egotistic businessman whose arrogance derails his sister Shanti's planned marriage. He falls in love with artist Anu Reddy and woos her. They fear his father will not accept them, but her headstrong attitude impresses him. At a function, he boldy announces that they will be married to their surprise. Suddenly, her uncle turns up and takes Shanti away to everyone's shock. They learn that Anu's mother, Shailaja Reddy, is a domineering village leader who uses vigilantism and her influence to punish abusers and better her people's standing. Five years back, Shailaja wanted Anu to become a doctor as part of her plan to provide free medical care to the women in the village despite her wish to study art, and the two have not talked directly since then. Chaitu is given the responsibility to take Shanti back and marry her on the day his father promises to avoid wounding his pride.

As it turns out Anu convinced her uncle not to disclose her romance to Shailaja, Chaitu and his assistant Chari masquerade as a good Samaritan and a doctor who want to set up a hospital in the village. Through various schemes and plans, they gradually ease the tensions between mother and daughter, but faces both his father's deadline and Shailaja's plan to marry Anu to a doctor the same day. When Shailaja is ready to embrace Anu, some of Chaitu's father's rivals come on the scene and disclose their love and his father's promise. Angered, Shailaja throws Chaitu out of the village. However, when she is later attacked by some of the abusers who want revenge, Chaitu comes back to protect them. When Shailaja is wounded, Anu uses her dupatta to wrap the wound, stunning her. After they come home, Chaitu scolds them for their hubris and Shailaja for not recognizing her daughter's career choices.

The next day, Chaitu's father gets a call from Shailaja that she has taken Shanti and will marry her off. Enraged, he goes to stop the wedding and take Chaitu away but is stopped by Shailaja, who reveals that she has accepted Chaitu as her son-in-law and realized her folly. Chaitu then reveals that he had convinced Shailaja to hold off on the marriage until they could get his father's blessings. Humbled, he joins the celebrations and agrees to both marriages.

== Cast ==
- Naga Chaitanya as Chaitanya/Chaitu
- Anu Emmanuel as Anu Reddy (voice dubbed by Chinmayi)
- Ramya Krishna as Shailaja Reddy, Anu's mother
- Naresh as Venu Reddy, Anu's father
- Murali Sharma as Chaitu's father
- Kalyani Natarajan as Chaitu's mother
- Vennela Kishore as Chari
- Prudhvi Raj as Manikyam
- Alka Rathore as Shanthi, Chaitu's sister
- Madhunandan as Shanthi's fiancee
- Dasari Arun Kumar as Anu's uncle
- Raghu Babu as Raghu
- Rajitha
- Shatru as Rival of Shailaja Reddy
- Sharanya Pradeep as Kumari
- Getup Srinu
- Nani as the narrator in the beginning of the film

== Soundtrack ==
Sailaja Reddy Alludu

Soundtrack album by Gopi Sundar
- Released: 19 August 2018
- Genre: Feature film soundtrack
- Length: 23:15
- Language: Telugu
- Label: Aditya Music

Gopi Sundar chronology
Geetha Govindam (2018)	Sailaja Reddy Alludu (2018)	Amala (2018)
External audio
- Official Audio Jukebox on YouTube

Music of the film was composed by Gopi Sundar and the audio was released through Aditya Music label.

No.	Title	Lyrics	Singer(s)	Length
1.	"Anu Baby"	Krishna Kanth (K.K)	Anudeep Dev	4:20
2.	"Sailaja Reddy Alludu Choode"	Kasarla Shyam	Satyavathi (Mangli)	3:15
3.	"Egiregire"	Krishna Kanth (K.K)	Sid Sriram, Lipsika	3:10
4.	"Gold Rangu Pilla"	Sri Mani	Anurag Kulkarni, Ramya Behera, Mohana Bhogaraju, M Haripriya	3:43
5.	"Pelli Pandhiri"	Sirivennela Seetharama Sastry	Vijay Yesudas	4:41
6.	"Thanu Vethikina"	Sirivennela Seetharama Sastry	Satya Yamini	4:04
Total length:				23:15

== Release and reception ==
At first the film was scheduled to release on 30 August 2018 and later postponed due to 2018 Kerala floods. It was rescheduled to release on 13 September 2018.

=== Box office ===
Shailaja Reddy Alludu, on the opening day it collected a total gross of ₹13.16 Crores and a share of ₹8.18 Crores worldwide. In the four day extended first weekend, movie collected a total gross of ₹28.29 Crores and a share of ₹17.25 Crores worldwide.

In the first weekend Shailaja Reddy Alludu beats movies like Manmarziyaan and Seema Raja in the overseas market by collecting a total gross of ₹2.95 Crores, and collected ₹2.60 Crores in United States, ₹6.54 Lakhs in United Kingdom, ₹27.11 Lakhs in Australia and ₹1.71 Lakhs in New Zealand respectively.

The film grossed over ₹37 crore at the box office by the end of its theatrical run and was declared as an average grosser.

=== Critical reception ===
The Times of India gave 3 out of 5 stars stating "Some preaching, some family drama, some humour and Shailaja Reddy Alludu plays safe for a festive release". Hindustan Times gave 2 out of 5 stars stating "Shailaja Reddy Alludu is a commercial entertainer and the same old formula of a sincere son-in-law who helps his lady love’s family is presented well. However, don’t go expecting anything beyond the film says it is – a formulaic entertainer that never even attempts to be anything more".

== Accolades ==
South Indian International Movie Awards

- Nominated - SIIMA Award for Best Supporting Actress (Telugu) - Ramya Krishna
- Nominated - SIIMA Award for Best Comedian (Telugu) - Prudhvi Raj
