= Premam (2016 film) =

2016 Telugu-language film by Chandoo Mondeti

- Theatrical release poster
- Directed by: Chandoo Mondeti
- Screenplay by: Chandoo Mondeti; Alphonse Puthren
- Story by: Alphonse Puthren
- Based on: Premam (2015)
- Produced by: Suryadevara Naga Vamsi
- Starring: Naga Chaitanya; Shruti Haasan; Madonna Sebastian; Anupama Parameswaran
- Cinematography: Karthik Gattamneni
- Edited by: Kotagiri Venkateswara Rao
- Music by: Rajesh Murugesan; Gopi Sundar
- Production company: Sithara Entertainments
- Distributed by: Haarika & Hassine Creations
- Release date: 7 October 2016
- Running time: 136 minutes
- Country: India
- Language: Telugu
- Budget: ₹20 crore
- Box office: ₹37.95 crore

Premam (transl. Love) is a 2016 Indian Telugu-language coming-of-age romantic drama film co-written and directed by Chandoo Mondeti and produced by Suryadevara Naga Vamsi. It is a remake of the 2015 Malayalam film of the same name. It featured Naga Chaitanya and Shruti Haasan, portraying the respective roles played by Nivin Pauly and Sai Pallavi in the original, whilst Madonna Sebastian and Anupama Parameswaran reprise their roles from the original. Venkatesh and Nagarjuna appear in guest roles. The plot shows Vikram and his friends' life from teenage to adulthood.

Principal photography commenced in September 2015, and ended within June 2016. The college portion, which became a crucial part of the original, was shot in Andhra University in Vizag, whereas two songs were shot at Norway. The film's cinematography was handled by Karthik Ghattamaneni and the editing was done by Kotagiri Venkateswara Rao. The film's soundtrack was composed by Rajesh Murugesan and Gopi Sundar, with former retaining four songs from the original, whereas the latter also composing the score. The film was released on 7 October 2016, coinciding with the Dasara festival weekend and received generally positive response from critics as well as audience. The film was one of the highest grossing Telugu films of the year 2016.

== Plot ==
The film opens in the year 2000, where Vikram (Naga Chaitanya), is shown to be a shy and modest young man who loves Suma (Anupama Parameswaran) who, unfortunately for Vicky, is loved by all the boys in the area. After a desperate attempt to write a love letter, Vikram is unable to give it to Suma due to her strict militarian father (Prudhviraj). He later gives the letter to his neighbour, a young girl, who is seen to be continuously hanging around Suma, to give it to her. Suma soon starts getting closer to Vicky, even coming to visit him at his home. However, he is shocked when he learns that she is already in love with another man, and only wanted help from Vicky to be able to communicate with her lover. Despite his friends and family trying to tell him that she is merely using him to achieve what she wanted, Vicky open-heartedly helps Suma whenever she needs help, showing his love for her.

In the second phase of his life, circa 2005, Vicky is a thug student in college, who goes around making trouble with his friends, Vasu (Praveen) and Siva (Chaitanya Krishna). After getting suspended for 2 months after beating their rival group led by Arjun (Noel Sean), they re-enter the college only to start ragging on the very first day. They apprehend a Marathi-Tamil lecturer, Sithara (Shruti Hassan), assuming her to be a student. She lets them go, but later punishes them when she finds out they were consuming alcohol in the class. Vikram begins to fall in love with Sithara. Meanwhile, the P.E. coach (Brahmaji) fails attempting to help lecturer Kantha Rao (Narra Srinu) to fulfil his love for Sithara. Vikram tricks both of them and slowly begins getting closer to Sithara. Later, he even begins calling her on phone. However, he feels scared when Sanjay (Arvind Krishna), Sithara's cousin, shows up, and expresses closeness to her. Realising he is feeling jealous, Sithara tries to get closer to him, eventually reciprocating his feelings. After celebrating Gudi Padva together, They both realise that they are in love with each other. After joining their annual day functions for a dance performance, Vicky and his friends are unable to get a good choreographer. Sithara, revealing she is a state level dancer, volunteers to help them, and they win the dance contest. Sithara is soon forced to go on a month leave to her hometown. A month later, however, it is revealed that her bus met with an accident, rendering her amnesiac, forcing her to leave the college. Vikram leaves to her hometown with his friends, but is heart-broken when she fails to recognise him, even after he shows her a bracelet she made specially for him.

11 years later, 2016, Vicky is one of the top chefs of Hyderabad, unfortunately still single with haunting memories of Sithara. He spends time with the manager of his restaurant, E.K. (Srinivasa Reddy). One night, he happens to meet Sindhu (Madonna Sebastian), who later reveals him that she is the young girl to whom he had asked to deliver Suma's letter, revealing she did not deliver but instead read it. Initially taking it as rude, Vikram forgives her and begins to spend time with her, eventually falling in love with her. He befriends Arjun at Arjun's bachelor party, and on the suggestion of his friends, decides to propose to her without further delay. However, she reveals him that she has a previous engagement, forcing Vicky to react violently. After ignoring her for days, he finally gives her a chance to speak, and she reveals the marriage was cancelled after her fiancé, Ravi substance abused her. After attempting to make peace with him over the phone, Ravi swears at Vicky, forcing him and his friends to bash Ravi. Vicky and Sindhu get married. Sithara and her present-husband Sanjay come to meet them after being invited by Vasu on Sindhu's request. After seeing a special Shrikhand dessert present there, she recalls the same dessert Vicky made her for Gudipadava, resuscitating her memory. However, she realizes he is better off without her, and decides not to reveal anything to him.

In a post-credits scene, it is shown that the reason for Vicky's restaurant's name being S-Star is that an astrologer had predicted his future wife would have a name starting from S. Vicky recalls his life in the last 16 years, recalling that each of the girls he loved had a name starting from S.

== Cast ==
- Naga Chaitanya as Vikram Vatsalya
- Shruti Haasan as Sithara Venkatesan, Vikram's ex-lover, Sanjay wife (Voice dubbed by Chinmayi)
- Madonna Sebastian as Sindhu Vatsalya, Vikram's wife.
  - Avantika Vandanapu as Young Sindhu
- Anupama Parameswaran as Suma, Vikram's 1st crush in school time
- Arvind Krishna as Sanjay, Sithara's husband
- Chaitanya Krishna as Siva
- Praveen as Vasu
- Srinivasa Reddy as E. Kanaka Rao / EK
- Prudhviraj as Suma's father
- Noel Sean as Arjun
- Viva Harsha as Vikram's friend
- Brahmaji as Coach
- Narra Srinu as Kantha Rao
- Jeeva as College Principal
- Josh Ravi as Vikram's friend
- Thagubothu Ramesh as Rio Samson
- Eldhose Sunny as Ravi
- Vinay Vijayan
- Satya as Dance choreographer
- Bunny Abiran
- Pujita Ponnada as a college student

Cameo appearances

- Nagarjuna as Vikram's father
- Venkatesh as DCP K. Ramachandra, Vikram's uncle
- Easwari Rao as Sithara's mother

== Production ==
After the success of the Malayalam film Premam, PDV Prasad of Sithara Entertainments, bagged the remake rights for the titled under the same name. In June 2015, Naga Chaitanya, was announced to play the lead role in the film, according to a report from The Indian Express. The principal photography for the film commenced in September 2015. Apart from Chaitanya, Shruti Haasan was announced to portray the role of a lecturer, played by Sai Pallavi in the film.

In August 2015, Anupama Parameswaran was hired to reprise her original character from the film, alongside Madonna Sebastian, both making their Telugu debut in the film. The college portion, which became a crucial part of the original, was shot in Andhra University in Vizag. Two songs were shot at Norway. Both Nagarjuna and Daggubati Venkatesh made cameo appearance in the film.

== Music ==
Premam

Soundtrack album by Gopi Sundar and Rajesh Murugesan
- Released: 7 September 2016
- Recorded: 2016
- Genre: Feature film soundtrack
- Length: 24:00
- Language: Telugu
- Label: Aditya Music
- Producers: Gopi Sundar; Rajesh Murugesan
External audio
- Official Audio Jukebox on YouTube

Premam's original soundtrack album features seven songs, with four of them being reused from the original counterpart film, which were composed by Rajesh Murugesan, and three songs being composed by Gopi Sundar. The lyrics for the songs were written by Sri Mani, Ramajogayya Sastry, Vanamali, Purna Chary and Krishna Madineni, whilst Vijay Yesudas, Haricharan, Sachin Warrier, Ranjith, Naresh Iyer and Karthik contributed their vocals to the songs. The track "Evare" which was reused from the Malayalam song "Malare" was released as the first single from the album on 17 August 2016, and received praise from music listeners, without changing the original singer for the song. An article from Firstpost slated that the song is a throwback to the Malayalam original. The second song "Bang Bang" was released on 25 August 2016. Aditya Music unveiled the complete soundtrack album on 7 September 2016, at an audio-release promotional event held at Hyderabad.

The album received positive response from music critics, as well as listeners and the songs topped the radio charts upon release. Writing for The Times of India, Neetishta Nyayapati gave three-and-a-half out of five stars, and stated "The album is mature and will come as a breath of fresh air."

No.	Title	Lyrics	Music	Singer(s)	Length
1.	"Evare"	Sri Mani	Rajesh Murugesan	Vijay Yesudas	5:09
2.	"Bang Bang"	Ramajogayya Sastry	Gopi Sundar	Haricharan	3:44
3.	"Ennosarlu"	Vanamali	Gopi Sundar	Sachin Warrier	2:57
4.	"Evadu Evadu"	Sri Mani	Gopi Sundar	Ranjith	3:21
5.	"Agarottula"	Purna Chary	Rajesh Murugesan	Naresh Iyer	3:25
6.	"Prema Pusene"	Purna Chary	Rajesh Murugesan	Karthik	2:43
7.	"Ninna Leni"	Krishna Madineni	Rajesh Murugesan	Karthik	2:21
Total length:					24:00

== Release ==
The first look of the film was released on 24 February 2016. On 3 June 2016, the makers of Premam announced the release of the film scheduling on the Independence Day weekend, which falls on 12 August 2016. The team also planned to launch the teaser on 11 June 2016, but no official confirmation was announced. Reports stated that the film, will be postponed to 25 August, to avoid clash with Janatha Garage (2016), On July, the makers announced that the film will be postponed to September, due to delay in production. It was later announced that the film's release date was finalised as 7 October 2016. Originally, Premam was set to clash with Ram Charan-starrer Dhruva (2016), on the same date. However, the delay in the release of the latter, made way for the team to have a solo-release. The film was awarded with 'U/A' Certificate by Central Board of Film Certification.

=== Marketing ===
Though Premam being one of the most anticipated films of the year, the film was subjected to trolls and criticisms, by fans of the original Malayalam counterpart. On 29 August 2016, the promo of the first single "Evare" (a remake of the Malayalam original song "Malare"), featuring Haasan and Chaitanya was released, and was criticised for not recreating the magic of the original song, featuring Sai Pallavi and Nivin Pauly. Fans trolled Shruti and Chaitanya at the film's pre-release event held on 20 September 2016, in Hyderabad, with many tagging her and also his performances as "overacting" and claimed that she and he failed to perfectly reprise Pallavi and Nivin's role from the original. Also, Shruti's performance was mainly criticized as overacting, unrealistic and she even didn't reprise as Malar. Despite trolls and criticisms, the theatrical trailer which released through the video-sharing platform, YouTube on 21 September, crossed 2 million views within release.

== Reception ==
=== Critical reception ===
The Indian Express gave 3 out of 5 stars stating "Despite cameos by Venkatesh and Nagarjuna, this Naga Chaitanya and Shruti Haasan film fails to match up to Premam's Malayalam version". The New Indian Express gave 3 out of 5 stars stating Remaking a classic like Premam is risky business. Chandoo Mondeti has adapted it in a way to appeal to the typical Telugu film lovers. Chaitanya charm us along with Anupama and 'Madonna".

Jeevi of Idlebrain.com gave the film 3.25/5 and said "Plus points of the film are casting (especially Naga Chaitanya), beautiful moments and realistic approach by director. On the flipside, there are a few dull moments in second half due to a few forced comedy elements (Sathya teaching dancing etc). On a whole, Premam is a film of moments that explores love in its purest/idealistic perspective. You may watch it!". Sify gave 3 out of 5 stars and then summarised "Premam is all for some genuine fun and perhaps, a few nostalgic moments as well. It’s a lengthy ride for sure, but it will leave you wanting for more."

The Times of India gave 3.5 out of 5 stars stating "Watch this film for Naga Chaitanya and for director Chandoo whose honest approach towards making this film has made it unique". Comparing to the original Premam film makes you disappointed.

=== Box office ===
As of 15 October 2016,Premam collected ₹15 Crores gross.

In international market movie collected 834k USD in lifetime as per Box Office Mojo.

== Awards and nominations ==
Date of ceremony	Award	Category	Recipient(s) and nominee(s)	Result	Ref.
28 & 29 March 2017	2nd IIFA Utsavam	Supporting Role – Female	Anupama Parameswaran	Won	
28 & 29 March 2017	2nd IIFA Utsavam	Best Lyricist	Sri Mani	Nominated	
28 & 29 March 2017	2nd IIFA Utsavam	Best Playback Singer – Male	Haricharan	Nominated	
9 April 2017	TSR – TV9 National Film Awards	Special Appreciation Hero Award	Naga Chaitanya	Won	
17 June 2017	64th Filmfare Awards South	Best Actor – Telugu	Naga Chaitanya	Nominated	
30 June and 1 July 2017	6th South Indian International Movie Awards	Best Supporting Actress (Telugu)	Anupama Parameswaran	Nominated	
30 June and 1 July 2017	6th South Indian International Movie Awards	Best Male Playback Singer (Telugu)	Vijay Yesudas	Nominated	
12 August 2017	15th Santosham Film Awards	Best Actor	Naga Chaitanya	Won	
