= Naga Chaitanya =

Indian actor (born 1986)

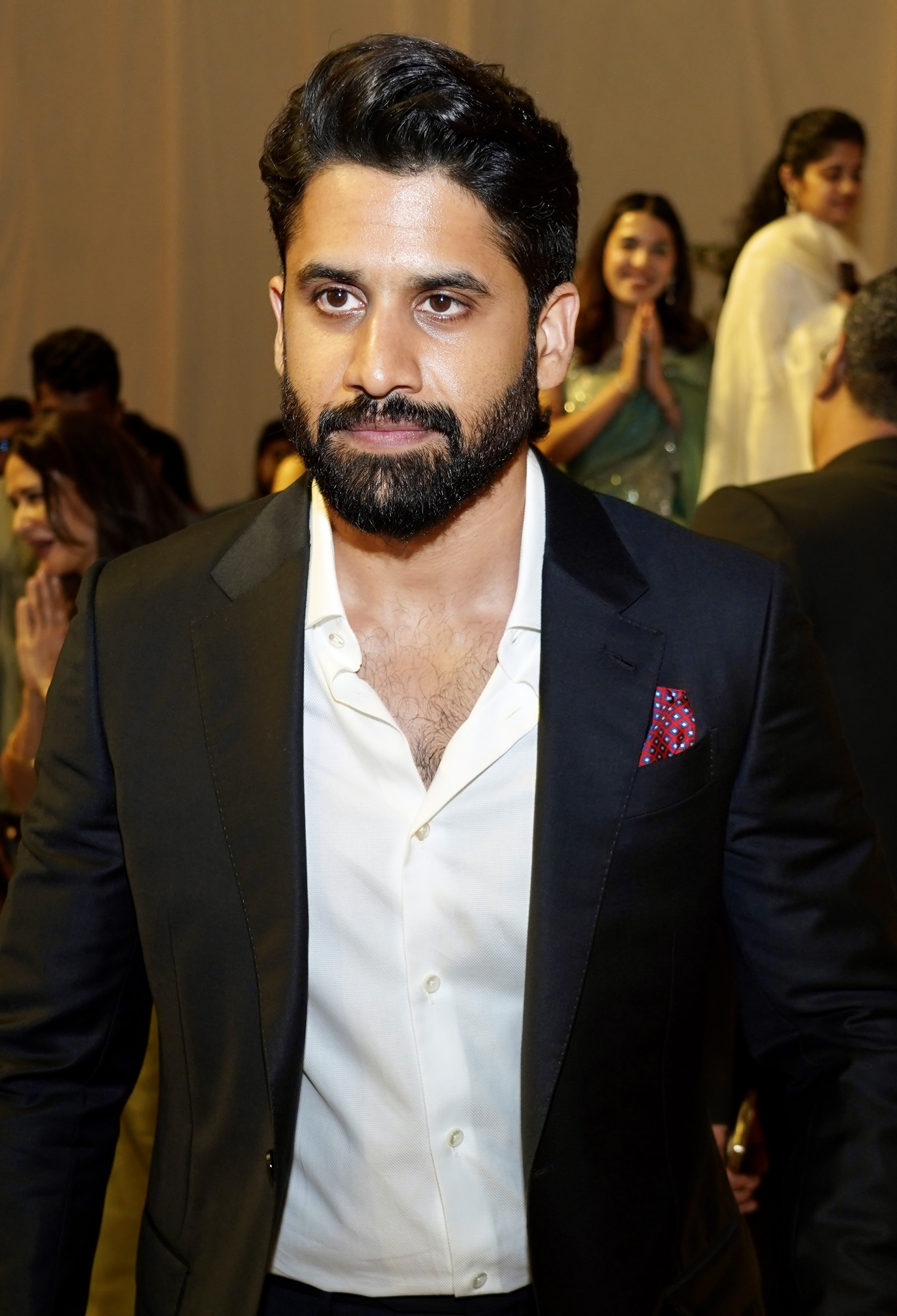
- Chaitanya in 2025
- Born: Akkineni Naga Chaitanya; 23 November 1986 (age 39); Hyderabad, Telangana, India
- Education: St. Mary's College, Hyderabad
- Occupations: Actor; entrepreneur
- Years active: 2009–present
- Spouses: Samantha Ruth Prabhu (m. 2017; div. 2021) Sobhita Dhulipala (m. 2024)
- Father: Akkineni Nagarjuna
- Family: Akkineni–Daggubati family
- Awards: Full list

Akkineni Naga Chaitanya (born 23 November 1986) is an Indian actor and entrepreneur who works predominantly in Telugu cinema. Chaitanya has received several accolades for his work, including one Filmfare Award South, one Nandi Award, one Telangana Gaddar Film Award and two SIIMA Awards.

Born into the prominent Akkineni–Daggubati family, he is the son of actor Akkineni Nagarjuna made his acting debut in 2009 with Josh, which won him the Filmfare Award for Best Male Debut – South. He achieved his career breakthrough with the romantic drama Ye Maaya Chesave (2010), earning his first Filmfare Award for Best Actor – Telugu nomination.

Chaitanya went on to star in successful films such as 100% Love (2011), Tadakha (2013), Manam (2014), Oka Laila Kosam (2014), Premam (2016), Rarandoi Veduka Chudham (2017), Majili (2019), Venky Mama (2019), Love Story (2021), and Bangarraju (2022). In 2022, Chaitanya expanded to Hindi films with the comedy drama Laal Singh Chaddha. He has since starred in the horror mystery series Dhootha (2023) and the romantic action film Thandel (2025), which ranks as his highest grossing release fetching him the Telangana Gaddar Film Award for Best Actor.

In addition to his film career, Chaitanya is the owner of the cloud kitchen chains like Shoyu and Scuzi, and is a celebrity endorser for numerous brands and products. He is married to actress Sobhita Dhulipala.

== Early life and family ==
Chaitanya was born on 23 November 1986 in a Telugu family to actor Akkineni Nagarjuna and Lakshmi Daggubati in Hyderabad. His paternal grandfather, actor Akkineni Nageswara Rao and his maternal grandfather, producer D. Ramanaidu are prominent figures in Telugu cinema. Chaitanya's parents got divorced when he was a child. Both his parents later remarried. While Nagarjuna married former actress Amala Mukherjee, Lakshmi married Sharath Vijayaraghavan, a corporate executive at Sundaram Motors. Chaitanya has a paternal half-brother, actor Akhil Akkineni, and a maternal step-brother. His maternal uncle, Venkatesh, and first cousins, Rana Daggubati, Sumanth and Sushanth, are also actors.

Chaitanya grew up in Chennai, where he was raised for 18 1/2 years. He was educated at Padma Seshadri Bala Bhavan, Chennai and at AMM School, Chennai. He then completed his graduation from St. Mary's College, Hyderabad. He expressed his desire to Nagarjuna to take up acting as his profession during his second year in college. He enrolled in a three-month acting course in Mumbai. He received further training in acting and martial arts in Los Angeles, apart from taking voice and dialogue coaching for one year before making his acting debut.

== Career ==
=== Breakthrough and early struggle (2009–2012) ===
Chaitanya debuted in 2009 with the film Josh, directed by Vasu Varma, in which he played a college student. Rediff.com wrote: "As a debutant, Naga Chaitanya has performed well. He has his moments where he's proven himself. There is always scope for improvement and one hopes that he will hone his skills in the years to come." Chaitanya won the Filmfare Award for Best Male Debut - South.

He next starred in the 2010 romantic drama Ye Maaya Chesave, directed by Gautham Vasudev Menon, which was simultaneously shot in Tamil as Vinnaithaandi Varuvaayaa, with a different cast and climax. He played a Hindu Telugu assistant director who falls in love with a Christian Malayali girl. A reviewer from Sify.com wrote: "Naga Chaitanya is at home in romantic scenes. His asset is his voice and his casual acting style. Chaitanya has improved his performance from his first film. He can now confidently act in more romantic films and strengthen his position." However, the reviewer felt that he should concentrate on his looks as he felt that Chaitanya looked "very boyish". The film was a success at the box office and went on to receive a cult status. He also received a nomination for Filmfare Award for Best Actor – Telugu.

After Ye Maaya Chesave, he paired up with Tamannaah Bhatia in 2011 for love story titled 100% Love, in which he played a studious and egotistical college student who is the top ranker of his college. It was a box office success. His next film was Dhada (2011). The Times of India wrote, "After good performances in his last two films, Naga Chaitanya doesn't live up to expectations. He has the same expression stuck on his face throughout the movie."

His next release that year was Bejawada, directed by Vivek Krishna. The film saw Chaitanya portraying the role of a college student-turned-gangster. The film received negative reviews, with critics calling it his worst film. His performance was also panned by critics. The Times of India wrote: "This film might have even outdone "Dhada", in being called the worst film of Chaitanya's career. While the young actor still needs to work on his facial expressions, he was saddled with a poorly sketched character in this film, devoid of all heroism, and he fails to rise above it."

=== Commercial success and fluctuations (2013–2018) ===
Chaitanya's next film, Tadakha in 2013, was an official remake of N. Lingusamy's Tamil action film Vettai. The Hindu wrote: "Naga Chaitanya shows tremendous improvement even his last outing, the debacle called Bejawada. He is in sync with his role, exudes over confidence and seems to have had funny stunt sequences and comic portions. Reprising a role played by an established actor like Arya is no mean task and Chaitanya pulls it off rather well." The film was commercially successful, giving the actor a much needed break.

In 2014, Chaitanya appeared in the period-drama Manam, which also featured his grandfather, Akkineni Nageswara Rao, and father, Nagarjuna. He played two roles in the film, which were of a middle class father in 1983 and a happy-go-lucky college student. Deccan Chronicle wrote: "Naga Chaitanya has done a decent job and compared to his earlier films he matured a lot as an actor." Sify.com wrote "There is lot of improvement in Naga Chaitanya's acting. He looks natural and has done justice to his role."

His next release was the political-drama Autonagar Surya, directed by Deva Katta, in which he played Surya, a skilled mechanic. Upon release, the film received mixed reviews from critics, who however appreciated Chaitanya's performance in the film calling it one of his best efforts. The film ended up as a flop. The Hindu wrote: "One rarely gets to see Naga Chaitanya smiling in this film. Chaitanya brings in the right amount of grit and intensity required for his role and shows that he can carry a film on his shoulders with the help of an able director." He later starred in romantic comedy Oka Laila Kosam in 2014. The Times of India wrote, "Oka Laila Kosam is a simple love story which doesn't quite leave you with a big smile on your face, but it has enough mojo, if you are a big sucker for romance." In 2015, he played the lead in the action-crime drama Dohchay, directed by Sudheer Varma.

In 2016, Naga Chaitanya starred in the remake of the 2015 Malayalam cult-romantic film Premam, of the same name, alongside Shruti Hassan. The film became a commercial success. Times of India noted, "Naga Chaitanya shows the variation in his portrayal that leave you in awe of him and makes you wonder why he never showed the prowess before." After the success of Premam, his next release was Sahasam Swasaga Sagipo, released two days after demonetisation and won him critical acclaim. received positive reviews. The New Indian Express stated, "Naga Chaitanya's casting for a role like this was spot on, and the actor delivers one of his finest performances till date". In 2017, he had two releases. Firstly, the family drama Rarandoi Veduka Chudham, directed by Kalyan Krishna opposite Rakul Preet Singh. Firstpost wrote, "Naga Chaitanya has, quite clearly, put his best foot forward. In this film, he doesn't let his silence do most of the talking, his body language is different and the actor does a pretty job. Secondly, the thriller film Yuddham Sharanam opposite Lavanya Tripathi.

Chaitanya starred in a brief role in the 2018 Savitri's biopic, Mahanati, directed by Nag Ashwin, which was a huge hit. He played his grandfather Nageswara Rao. In the same year, he starred in Maruthi-directed Shailaja Reddy Alludu alongside Anu Emmanuel and Ramya Krishnan. Hindustan Times wrote, "The film is a commercial entertainer and the same old formula of a sincere son-in-law who helps his lady love's family is presented well." Two months later, his next film, the thriller Savyasachi directed by Chandoo Mondeti featured Chaitanya in the role of an ambidextrous man. India Today wrote, "Chaitanya does his part well but looks caricaturish in the romantic portions and they test your patience."

=== Critical acclaim and career progression (2019-present) ===
Chaitanya featured in the 2019 film Majili along with Samantha Ruth Prabhu, in their fourth film together. With a gross of ₹700 million (equivalent to ₹870 million or US$9.0 million in 2023), Majili become the highest-grossing film in Chaitanya's career. The Hindu noted, "As Poorna, we see a new Naga Chaitanya. He looks the part and shines in his portrayal of a young, aspiring cricketer." India Today stated, "Naga Chaitanya has delivered his career-best performance as Purna. As a grief-stricken guy, he shines in the portions where he is still recovering from his tragic break-up." Later that year, he starred in Venky Mama alongside his maternal uncle Venkatesh and Raashi Khanna. The film was a profitable venture, grossing ₹720 million (equivalent to ₹890 million or US$9.3 million in 2023).

In 2021, Chaitanya starred as a lower caste boy in the film Love Story opposite Sai Pallavi. The film grossed over ₹90 crore at the box office, and became a commercially successful venture. Deccan Chronicle noted, "Naga Chaitanya delivers his career's best; he's brilliant as a guy constantly facing caste discrimination yet moving on. Indeed, he had to unlearn much for the role, which is evident in his performance." While Times of India wrote, "Naga Chaitanya easily delivers one of his career's best performances. He is handed a character that's sensitive, polite and someone who's not afraid to go the extra mile for love – and he pulls it off well."

Chaitanya had three releases in 2022. He appeared in Bangarraju along with his father, Nagarjuna Sakshi stated, "Nagarjuna and Chaitanya are the core strength of the film". The film received mixed reviews but was a commercial success. He next appeared in Thank You with Raashi Khanna. The film received mixed to negative reviews, The Hans India wrote "Though, Chaitanya nailed it with his performance but that is not sufficient to save this rudderless drama with no proper mission." Chaitanya made his Hindi film debut with Laal Singh Chaddha, his final release of the year. He played an army officer alongside Aamir Khan. It was declared a box office bomb, but became the highest-grossing Hindi film of 2022 at international box office. Filmfare noted, "Naga Chaitanya isn't playing the central character, but manages to leave an impact through his sincerity and commitment to the role."

In 2023, he played a constable in the Telugu-Tamil bilingual film, Custody, alongside Krithi Shetty. It marked his Tamil debut. Hindustan Times wrote, "Naga Chaitanya plays his part quite well and this is definitely an attempt worth some praise." Chaitanya then made his digital debut with the Amazon Prime Video's web series, Dhootha, where he played an investigation journalist alongside Priya Bhavani Shankar. Hindustan Times stated, "Dhootha gives Naga Chaitanya the chance to do something he hasn't before – shed his 'good boy' image. His performance might not always land, but he keeps you invested in most of the episodes that require him to do the heavy-lifting."

In his first release of 2025, Chaitanya played a fisherman in Thandel, opposite Sai Pallavi. T Maruthi Acharya took note of his ease in romantic dramas and added, "Chaitanya slips into Raju’s character with ease and charm. His transformation, especially his attempt at the Srikakulam accent, lends authenticity to the role." The film became a commercial success and Chaitanya's highest grossing release.

== Personal life ==
Chaitanya began dating actress Samantha Ruth Prabhu in 2015. The couple got engaged in a ceremony in Goa on 29 January 2017. Chaitanya married Samantha in Goa on 6 October 2017, following traditional Hindu wedding customs, and had a Christian ceremony on 7 October 2017. They announced their separation on 2 October 2021, and were subsequently divorced.

Chaitanya met actress Sobhita Dhulipala in 2022 and they eventually began dating. After two years of relationship, the couple got engaged on 8 August 2024 in Hyderabad. Chaitanya married Dhulipala on 4 December 2024 at Annapurna Studios.

== Other work and media image ==
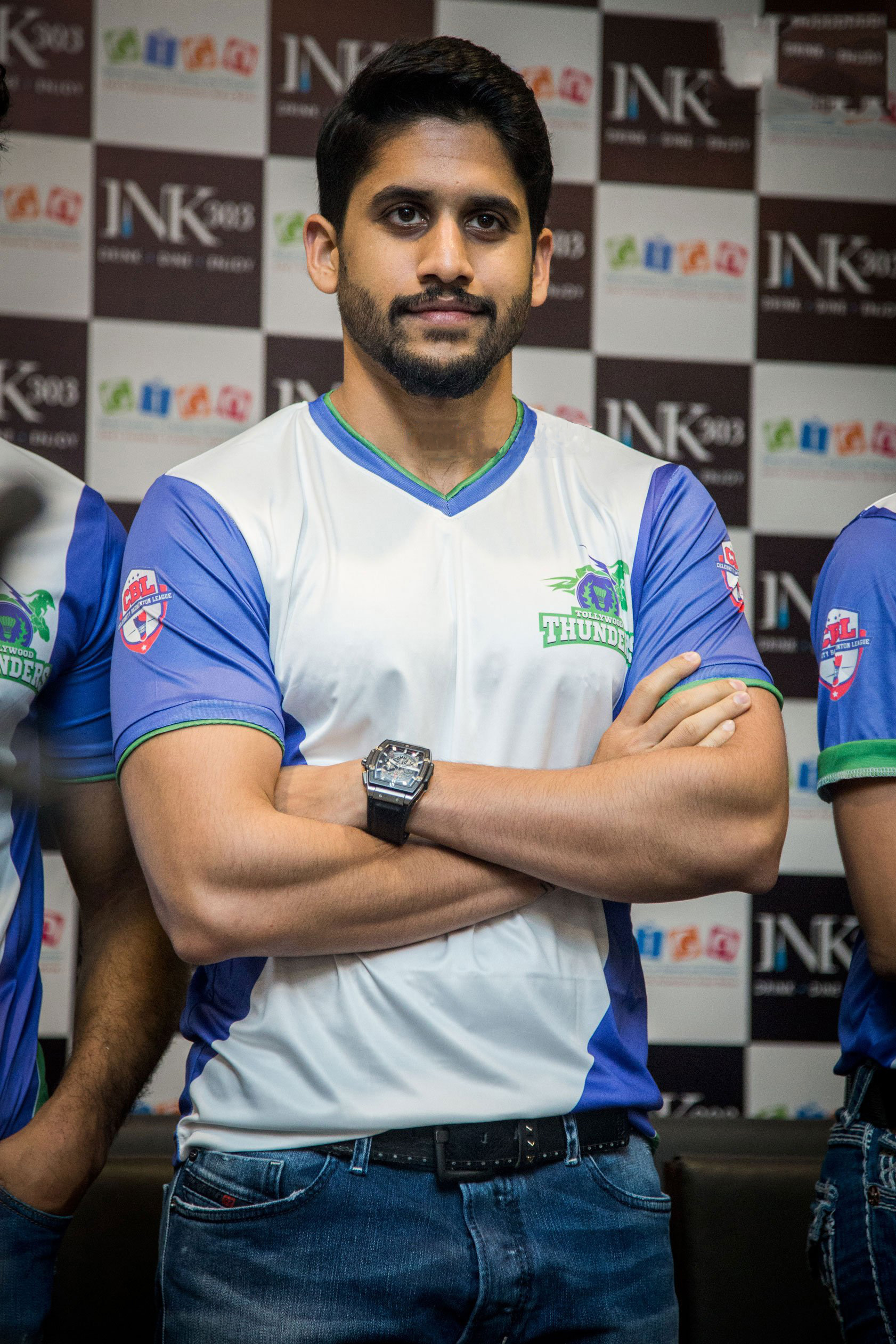
Chaitanya in 2018

Mayukh Majumdar of Filmfare termed him a "star down South". Karthik Kumar of Hindustan Times noted, "Chaitanya has proved himself as the heartthrob of Telugu cinema with his good looks and his romantic films." In Rediff.com's list of "Top 5 Telugu actors", he was placed second in 2010.

Chaitanya has frequently featured on the Hyderabad Times' Most Desirable Men list. He ranked 12th in 2017, 7th in 2018, 11th in 2019 and 6th in 2020. Chaitanya has also been associated with social causes. During the COVID-19 pandemic, he donated Rs 25 lakhs, to support daily wage workers in the film industry. Chaitanya is a celebrity endorser for brands and products including Ariel, Big Bazaar, Myntra and Colgate among others. In 2016, he also became the brand ambassador of Tollywood Thunders in the first season of the Celebrity Badminton League.

In 2022, Chaitanya started his own chain of cloud kitchen brand "Shoyu" in Hyderabad. Chaitanya also ventured into Motor Racing by acquiring the ownership of Motorsport racing team Hyderabad Blackbirds.

== Filmography ==
Key
| † | Denotes films that have not yet been released |

=== Films ===
- All films are in Telugu, unless otherwise noted.

| Year | Title | Role | Notes | Ref. |
|---|---|---|---|---|
| 2009 | Josh | Sathya | | |
| 2010 | Ye Maaya Chesave | Karthik Naidu | | |
| 2010 | Vinnaithaandi Varuvaayaa | Himself | Tamil film; Cameo appearance | |
| 2011 | 100% Love | Balu Mahendra | | |
| 2011 | Dhada | Vishwa | | |
| 2011 | Bejawada | Shiva Krishna | | |
| 2013 | Tadakha | Karthik | | |
| 2014 | Manam | Nagarjuna / Radha Mohan (Note: Naga Chaithanya plays in a dual role films.) | | |
| 2014 | Autonagar Surya | Surya | | |
| 2014 | Oka Laila Kosam | Karthik | | |
| 2015 | Dohchay | Chandu | | |
| 2015 | Krishnamma Kalipindi Iddarini | Himself | Cameo appearance | |
| 2016 | Premam | Vikram Vatsalya | | |
| 2016 | Aatadukundam Raa | Himself | Cameo appearance | |
| 2016 | Sahasam Swasaga Sagipo | Rajinikanth Muralidhar | | |
| 2017 | Rarandoi Veduka Chudham | Shiva | | |
| 2017 | Yuddham Sharanam | Arjun | | |
| 2018 | Mahanati | Akkineni Nageswara Rao | Cameo appearance | |
| 2018 | Shailaja Reddy Alludu | Chaitanya "Chaitu" (Note: Naga Chaitanya played a single character with two or more names.) | | |
| 2018 | Savyasachi | Vikramaditya "Vikram" / Aditya | | |
| 2019 | Majili | Poorna Chandra Rao | | |
| 2019 | Oh! Baby | Young Pasupuleti Kanakaraju | Cameo appearance | |
| 2019 | Venky Mama | Capt. Karthik Shivaram Veeramachineni | | |
| 2021 | Love Story | Revanth | | |
| 2022 | Bangarraju | Chinna Bangarraju | | |
| 2022 | Thank You | Abhiram | | |
| 2022 | Laal Singh Chaddha | Balaraju Bodi, Ramaraju Bodi, Devaraju Bodi and Varadaraju Bodi (Note: Naga Chaithanya plays four roles in the film.) | Hindi film | |
| 2023 | Custody | PC A. Shiva | Simultaneously shot in Tamil | |
| 2025 | Thandel | Raju | | |
| 2026 | Vrushakarma † | Arjun | Filming | |

=== Television ===
| Year | Title | Role | Network | Notes | Ref. |
|---|---|---|---|---|---|
| 2023 | Dhootha | Sagar Varma Avuduri | Amazon Prime Video | Lead role | |

== Accolades ==
Chaitanya won the Filmfare Award for Best Male Debut – South for Josh, and received three Filmfare Award for Best Actor – Telugu nominations for Ye Maaya Chesave, Premam and Love Story.
