= Khatija Rahman =

Indian musician

- Born: 29 December 1995 (age 30); Chennai, Tamil Nadu, India
- Occupations: Singer; composer
- Years active: 2010–present
- Spouse: Riyasdeen Riyan (m. 2022)
- Father: A. R. Rahman
- Relatives: A. R. Ameen (brother)
- Family: R. K. Shekhar family
- Awards: Full list
- Musical career
- Genres: Filmi; pop; Hindustani classical
- Instrument: Vocals
- Labels: Think Music; Island Records; YRF Music; Zee Music Company; Sony Music; Universal Music Group; Coke Studio Tamil; KM Musiq

Khatija Rahman (Note: Tamil pronunciation: [kɐt̪iːd͡ʑaː ɾɐkʊmaːn].) (Tamil pronunciation: [kɐt̪iːd͡ʑaː ɾɐkʊmaːn]; born 29 December 1995) is a music composer and singer from Chennai, India.

== Life and career ==
Khatija Rahman made her playback debut in the 2010 sci-fi action film Enthiran, singing the title track in Tamil, Telugu, and Hindi alongside musical legends including her father, A. R. Rahman, and S. P. Balasubrahmanyam.

In 2019, she collaborated with the Irish band U2 on their single "Ahimsa", which emphasised the power of non-violence. She also performed the track during U2's Joshua Tree Tour in Mumbai the same year.

Khatija released her debut single, "Farishton", in 2020. The song, composed and produced by A. R. Rahman with lyrics by Munna Shaokath Ali, was a meditative invocation of solidarity and cultural harmony. Its music video was recognised at multiple international film festivals and received an honourable mention at the 2021 Los Angeles Film Awards. In the same year, she was a featured artist on Grammy Award-winning composer Ricky Kej’s song "Iltaja", a track highlighting sustainability.

She continued to showcase her versatility with film songs, including "Rock A Bye Baby" from Mimi (2021), "Tum Bhi Raahi (Reprise)" from Mili (2022), and "Kaayam" from Iravin Nizhal (2022). She also contributed vocals to Rahman's 2022 Tamizh anthem "Moopilla Thamizhe Thaaye", collaborating with multiple artists.

In 2023, Khatija released her debut album Kuhu Kuhu, a collection of melodic renditions paying tribute to the legendary Lata Mangeshkar. The all-acoustic album features the Firdaus Orchestra, an all-female ensemble from the United Arab Emirates. Its lead single, “Piya Tose”, was accompanied by a music video symbolising global representation and collaboration. She also made her debut as a music composer with the film Minmini, releasing the lead single “Iru Perum Nadhigal”, a song centered on self-love and healing. That year, she further demonstrated her vocal range with songs such as “Chinnanjiru (Marumurai)” from Ponniyin Selvan: II (2023), "Pranama Pranama" from Nayakudu (2023), and her Coke Studio Tamil single "Sagavaasi" with Arivu, which received widespread acclaim.

== Discography ==
=== Film songs ===
| Year | Song | Film | Composer | Lyricist | Co-singer(s) | Language | Notes | Ref. |
|---|---|---|---|---|---|---|---|---|
| 2010 | "Puthiya Manidha" | Enthiran | A. R. Rahman | Vairamuthu | A. R. Rahman, S. P. Balasubrahmanyam | Tamil | | |
| 2010 | "O Maramanishi" | Robo (dubbed-language from Enthiran) | A. R. Rahman | Suddala Ashok Teja | A. R. Rahman, S. P. Balasubrahmanyam, Srinivas | Telugu | | |
| 2010 | "O Naye Insaan" | Robot (dubbed-language from Enthiran) | A. R. Rahman | Swanand Kirkire | A. R. Rahman, Srinivas | Hindi | | |
| 2021 | "Rock A Bye Baby" | Mimi | A. R. Rahman | Amitabh Bhattacharya | Julia Gartha | Hindi | | |
| 2021 | "Rihaayi De" | Mimi | A. R. Rahman | Amitabh Bhattacharya | A. R. Rahman | Hindi | Backing vocals | |
| 2022 | "Kaayam" | Iravin Nizhal | A. R. Rahman | R. Parthiban | Soundarya Bala Nandakumar, Veena Murali, Deepthi Suresh, Sowmya, Elfe Choir | Tamil | | |
| 2022 | "Tum Bhi Raahi (Reprise)" | Mili | A. R. Rahman | Javed Akhtar | Solo | Hindi | | |
| 2023 | "Chinnanjiru (Marumurai)" | Ponniyin Selvan: II | A. R. Rahman | Ilango Krishnan | A. R. Rahman | Tamil | | |
| 2023 | "Minnanchula Vennelaa (Reprise)" | Ponniyin Selvan: II | A. R. Rahman | Ramajogayya Sastry | A. R. Rahman | Telugu | | |
| 2023 | "Mera Aasmaan Jal Gaya (Reprise)" | Ponniyin Selvan: II | A. R. Rahman | Gulzar | A. R. Rahman | Hindi | | |
| 2023 | "Pranama Pranama" | Nayakudu (Dubbed from Maamannan) | A. R. Rahman | Rakendu Mouli | Vijay Yesudas | Telugu | | |
| 2023 | "Niraye" | Philip's | Hesham Abdul Wahab | Anu Elizabeth Jose | Hesham Abdul Wahab | Malayalam | | |
| 2023 | "Vizhigal Seraa" | Philip's | Hesham Abdul Wahab | Sangeeth Ravindran | Hesham Abdul Wahab | Malayalam | | |
| 2024 | "Anbalane" | Lal Salaam | A. R. Rahman | Yugabharathi | Deva, Deepthi Suresh | Tamil | Backing vocals | |
| 2024 | "Ulagam Oru Naal" | Maidaan | A. R. Rahman | Snehan | Shridhar Ramesh | Tamil | | |
| 2024 | "Thaaraa Gaganamlo" | Maidaan | A. R. Rahman | Saraswathi Putra, Ramajogayya Sastry | Sarath Santosh | Telugu | | |
| 2024 | "Maanja Nee" | Ayalaan | A. R. Rahman | Sivakarthikeyan, A. R. Rahman, thoughtsfornow | A. R. Rahman, A. R. Ameen | Tamil | Backing vocals | |
| 2024 | "The Silent Sovereign" | Ponniyin Selvan: II | A. R. Rahman | Ilango Krishnan | A. R. Rahman | Tamil | Backing vocals | |
| 2025 | "Jigar Thanda (Female)" | Tere Ishk Mein | A. R. Rahman | Pa. Vijay | Amina Rafiq, Adithya RK | Tamil | | |
| 2025 | "Yaavum Neeye" | Tere Ishk Mein | A. R. Rahman | Mashook Rahman | | Tamil | | |
| 2025 | "Chere Premaga" | Tere Ishk Mein | A. R. Rahman | Samrat | | Telugu | | |
| 2026 | "Rummy Rummy" | Gandhi Talks | A. R. Rahman | Pa. Vijay | | Tamil | | |
| 2026 | "Nindiya Pari" | Gandhi Talks | A. R. Rahman | Vishwadeep Zeest | Sarthak Kalyani | Hindi | | |
| 2026 | "Kalangaamale" | Gandhi Talks | A. R. Rahman | Madrashe | Sreekanth Hariharan | Tamil | | |
| 2026 | "Shubharatri Than Maalakhaye" | Gandhi Talks | A. R. Rahman | Vinayak Sasikumar | Jithin Raj | Malayalam | | |
| 2026 | "Angai" | Gandhi Talks | A. R. Rahman | Sameer Samant | Abhay Jodhpurkar | Marathi | | |

=== Film background scores ===
| Year | Film | Song | Singer(s) | Director | Music director | Composer | Lyricist | Language | Notes | Ref. |
|---|---|---|---|---|---|---|---|---|---|---|
| 2025 | Thug Life | "Ave Maria" | Khatija Rahman, Adam Greig | Mani Ratnam | A. R. Rahman | Franz Schubert | Walter Scott | German | | |

=== Non-film songs ===
| Year | Song | Album | Composer | Lyricist | Co-singer(s) | Language | Notes | Ref. |
|---|---|---|---|---|---|---|---|---|
| 2019 | "Ahimsa" | Single | U2, A. R. Rahman | Traditional | U2, A. R. Rahman | English and Tamil | | |
| 2020 | "Farishton" | Single | A. R. Rahman | Munna Shaokath Ali | | Urdu | | |
| 2020 | "Farishtha" | Single | A. R. Rahman | Mashook Rahman | | Tamil | | |
| 2020 | "EK" | Iltaja | Ricky Kej | IP Singh, Lonnie Park, Dominic D'Cruz, Ricky Kej | Varijashree Venugopal, Manoj George, Arun Kumar, Aparna Ramakrishnan | Hindi | | |
| 2020 | "The 99 Names" | Single | Sami Yusuf | Chorus | Sami Yusuf, Raihanah, Isshrathquadhre, Raheema Rahman | Arabic | | |
| 2020 | "Hum Haar Nahin Maanenge" | Single | A. R. Rahman | Prasoon Joshi | A. R. Rahman, Clinton Cerejo, Mohit Chauhan, Mika Singh, Harshdeep Kaur, Jonita Gandhi, Neeti Mohan, Javed Ali, Sid Sriram, Shruti Haasan, Shashaa Tirupati, Abhay Jodhpurkar | Hindi | | |
| 2021 | "Amna Bibi" | Sing A Lullaby | Traditional | Traditional | Gurupriya Atreya, Vedanth Bharadwaj | Hindi | | |
| 2022 | "Moopilla Thamizhe Thaaye" | Single | A. R. Rahman | Thamarai | A. R. Rahman, Saindhavi Prakash, A. R. Ameen, Amina Rafiq, Gabriella Sellus, Poovaiyar, Rakshita Suresh, Niranjana Ramanan, Aparna Harikumar, Nakul Abhyankar | Tamil | | |
| 2023 | "Sagavaasi" | Coke Studio Tamil (Season 1) | Arivu | Arivu | Arivu | Tamil | | |
| 2024 | "Woman of Power" | Single | Sterlin Nithya | Lavita Lobo | Lavita Lobo, Sterlin Nithya | English | | |
| 2025 | "Engal Thamizhe" | Indie track | Vilva | Vilva | Vilva | Tamil | | |
| 2025 | "Shukrana" | Single | Asad Khan | Raqueeb Alam | | English and Urdu | Islamic devotional song | |

=== Albums ===
| Year | Album | Song | Composer | Lyricist | Co-singer(s) | Language | Notes | Ref. |
|---|---|---|---|---|---|---|---|---|
| 2023 | Kuhu Kuhu | "Piya Tose Naina Lage Re" | Sachin Dev Burman | Shailendra | Firdaus Orchestra | Hindi | | |
| 2023 | Kuhu Kuhu | "Aap Ki Nazron Ne Samjha" | Raja Mehdi Ali Khan | Madan Mohan | Firdaus Orchestra | Hindi | | |
| 2023 | Kuhu Kuhu | "O Sajana Barkha Bahar" | Salil Chowdhury | Shailendra | Firdaus Orchestra | Hindi | | |
| 2023 | Kuhu Kuhu | "Kuhu Kuhu Bole Koyalia" | P. Adinarayana Rao | Bharat Vyas | Firdaus Orchestra, Sarthak Kalyani | Hindi | | |
| 2023 | Kuhu Kuhu | "Bekas Pe Karam Keejiye" | Naushad | Shakeel Badayuni | Firdaus Orchestra | Hindi | | |

=== Compositions ===
| Year | Film | Song | Singer(s) | Lyricist | Director | Language | Notes | Ref. |
|---|---|---|---|---|---|---|---|---|
| 2024 | Minmini | "Iru Perum Nadhigal" | Shakthisree Gopalan | Halitha Shameem | Halitha Shameem | Tamil | | |
| 2024 | Minmini | "Minmini Nee" | Sarthak Kalyani, Sireesha Bhagavatula | Halitha Shameem | Halitha Shameem | Tamil | | |
| 2024 | Minmini | "Uyirai" | Suryansh | Halitha Shameem | Halitha Shameem | Tamil | | |
| 2024 | Minmini | "Jananam" | Khatija Rahman, Sireesha Bhagavatula | Halitha Shameem | Halitha Shameem | Tamil | | |

=== Voice-overs ===
| Year | Film | Actor | Director | Producer | Writer | Language | Notes | Ref. |
|---|---|---|---|---|---|---|---|---|
| 2021 | 99 Songs | Edilsy Vargas | Vishwesh Krishnamoorthy | A. R. Rahman | Vishwesh Krishnamoorthy, A. R. Rahman | Tamil | For Tamil version | |
| 2025 | Stardust | – | – | Pollachi Papyrus and Faraway Originals | Pankaj Singh | English | | |

== Live performances ==
| Title | Date | Venue | Performed song(s) | Shows | Attendance | Notes | Ref. |
|---|---|---|---|---|---|---|---|
| The Joshua Tree Tour 2019 | 15 December 2019 | DY Patil Stadium, Mumbai | Ahimsa | 1 | 42,590 | | |
| World Children's Day Concert at Expo 2020 | 21 November 2021 | Al Wasl Plaza, Dubai | – | 1 | – | | |
| Wings of Love: The AR Rahman Sufi Experience | 19 March 2023 | Nehru Indoor Stadium, Chennai | – | 1 | – | | |
| TEDxGateway Opening Act Performance | 4 June 2023 | NCPA, Mumbai | – | 1 | – | | |
| Marakkuma Nenjam Concert | 20 August 2023 | Codissia Ground, Coimbatore | – | 1 | | | |
| Marakkuma Nenjam Concert | 10 September 2023 | Adityaram Palace City, Chennai | – | 1 | 45,000 | | |
| South Side Story | 31 August – 1 September 2024 | Indira Gandhi Indoor Stadium, New Delhi | – | 2 | – | | |
| Tanweer Festival | 21 November 2015 | Mleiha, Sharjah | – | 1 | | World Premier of Rooh-e-Noor, an all-women ensemble | |
| Sheikh Zayed Festival | 29 November 2025 | Al Wathba, Abu Dhabi | – | 1 | – | Rooh-e-Noor, an all-women ensemble | |
| Khatija Rahman Live — The Garden of Echoes | 5 December 2025 | Museum Theatre, Egmore, Chennai | – | 1 | 450 | Sold-out show | |
| Concert in the Dark | 10 December 2025 | Naam Foundation | 2 | 1 | – | Launched by Anil Srinivasan | |

== Awards and nominations ==
| Year | Award | Category | Nominated work | Awarded by | Result | Ref. |
|---|---|---|---|---|---|---|
| 2020 | Trend Setter Award | – | – | Global Women Inspiration Awards and Conclave | Won | |
| 2021 | Coastal Star Award | – | – | Rotary Club of Chennai Coastal | Won | |
| 2022 | 14th Mirchi Music Awards | Upcoming Female Vocalist of the Year | "Rock A Bye Baby" (Mimi) | Radio Mirchi | Nominated | |
| 2022 | Tamil Nadu State Film Awards | Best Female Playback Singer | "Kaayam" (Iravin Nizhal) | Government of Tamil Nadu | Won | |
| 2024 | IMW Indian Award | Best Debut Music Director of the Year | Minmini | Indian Media Works | Won | |
| 2024 | Ananda Vikatan Cinema Awards | Best Music Composer (Songs) | Minmini | Ananda Vikatan | Nominated | |
| 2025 | Devi Awards | For remarkable contributions to music and art | – | The New Indian Express | Won | |
| 2025 | SIIMA | Best Music Director – Tamil | Minmini | Vibri Media | Nominated | |
| 2025 | 12th Annual Raindropss Women Achievers Awards | Excellence in Music and Arts | – | Raindropss Charity Foundation | Won | |
