= Al Marmoom Desert Conservation Reserve =

Nature conservation reserve in the United Arab Emirates

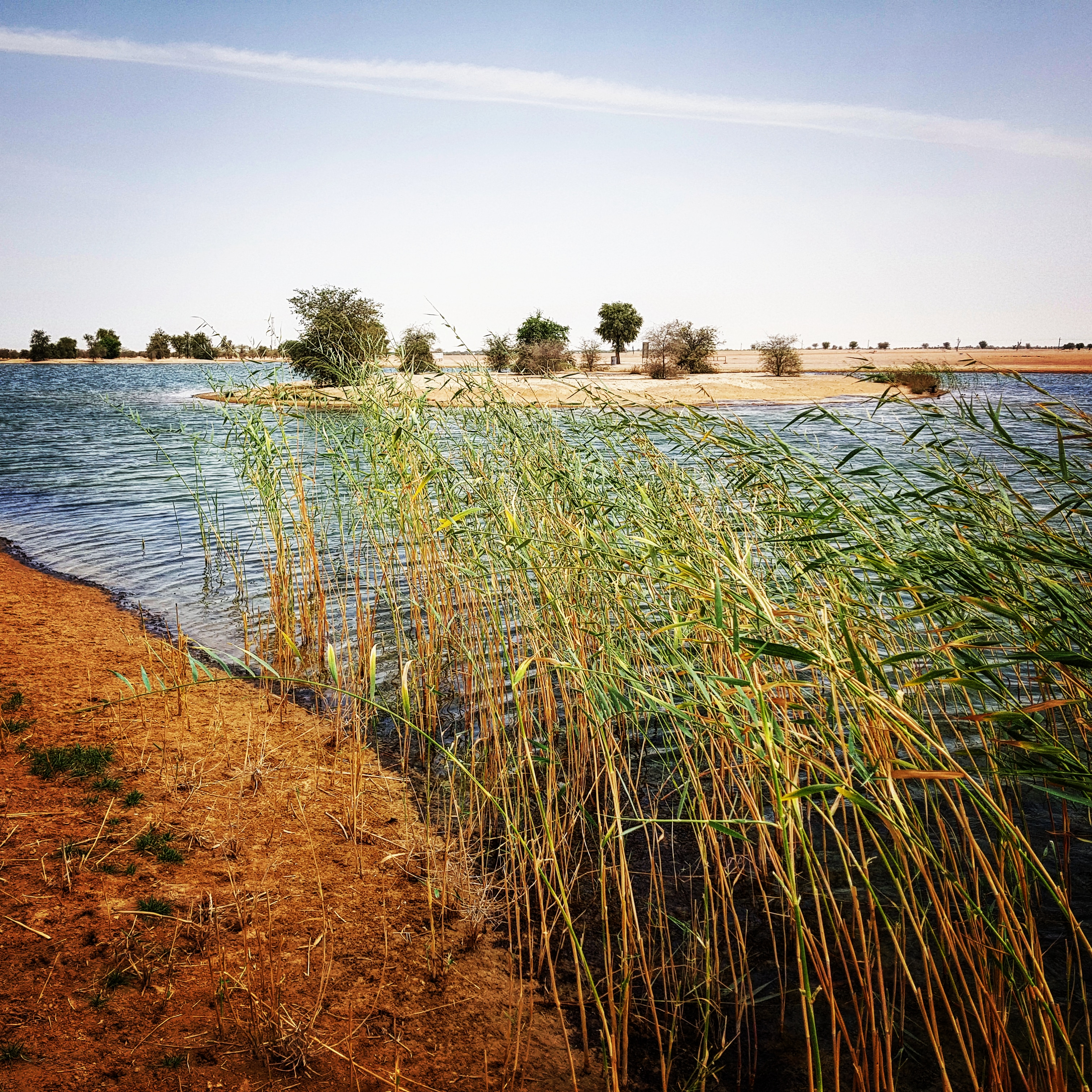
- Al Qudra Lakes at Al Marmoom

- Location within United Arab Emirates Location within Asia
- Location: Dubai, the UAE
- Nearest city: Dubai
- Coordinates: 24°50′1.73″N 55°22′34.36″E
- Area: 40 ha (99 acres)
- Established: January 2018
- Governing body: Dubai Municipality

Al Marmoom Desert Conservation Reserve (Arabic: محمية المرموم الصحراوية) is the first unfenced nature conservation reserve in the United Arab Emirates. It is located in the desert area of Saih Al Salam in the Emirate of Dubai and comprises some 10% of the total land area of the emirate, including the extensive man-made desert wetlands, Al Qudra Lakes.

== Ecology and geography ==
The reserve spans over 40 ha (99 acres) of desert shrub land and 10 km (6.2 miles) of lakes and is home to 26 identified species of reptiles, nine of mammals and 39 species of plants. It provides a sanctuary for 19 animal species considered endangered, as well as flocks of between 300 and 500 flamingos and over 360 other bird species, of which 158 are migratory. Rare species observed at Al Marmoom include the Egyptian nightjar (Caprimulgus aegyptius) and the giant skipper butterfly (Coeliades anchises jucunda), which is native to the island of Socotra, off Yemen.

== History ==
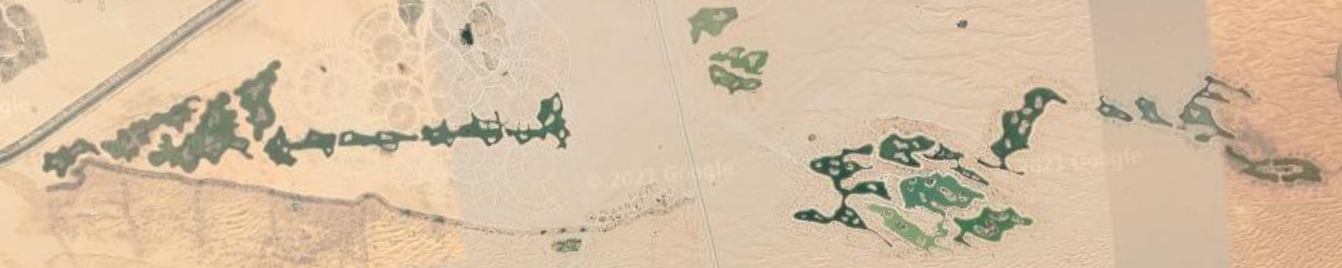
An aerial view of the Al Qudra Lakes

Its announcement, in January 2018, followed public concern regarding the fouling of the area by tourists as well as a number of deaths of birds and fish in the lakes.

== Management ==
Al Marmoom is managed by Dubai Municipality, The formalisation of the reserve has introduced some restrictions to human leisure activity in the area, long a popular visiting place for residents. The move to regulate camping, barbecuing and picnicking was welcomed by the Emirates Environmental Group (EEG), an organisation which had organised cleanup campaigns in the area in the past.

The Marmoom Biosphere Centre is intended as a facility for studying the sustainable development and management of the reserve, as well as serving as a centre for sustainable ecotourism, and will aim to be the main source of specialized ecosystem management practices in the region.

== Leisure activities ==
The Reserve currently has a number of animal and bird observation platforms, star and sunset observation decks and an 84 km cycling track, one of the world's largest. Barbecue and camping is also permitted to tourists and residents of the country.There is an ongoing development program for the reserve, including bird breeding programs as well as the development of an outdoor theatre and other facilities intended to be powered by a 5,000 megawatt solar power plant. Al Marmoom is served by one of Dubai's distinctive 'Last Exit' food truck parks. The extensive lakeland in the reserve includes Love Lake, in the shape of two intertwined hearts.

Star gazing events are often held at Al Marmoom by Dubai Astronomy Group as the area has little to no light pollution. Some 20 sporting and social events have taken place in the Reserve since its launch, including a junior fun day organized Pink Caravan, the UAE-based breast cancer awareness initiative.

The Bab Al Shams Desert Resort & Spa in Mugatrah is situated close to the Reserve.

In February 2026, the Al Layan Oasis was announced as an eco-tourism development within the reserve.

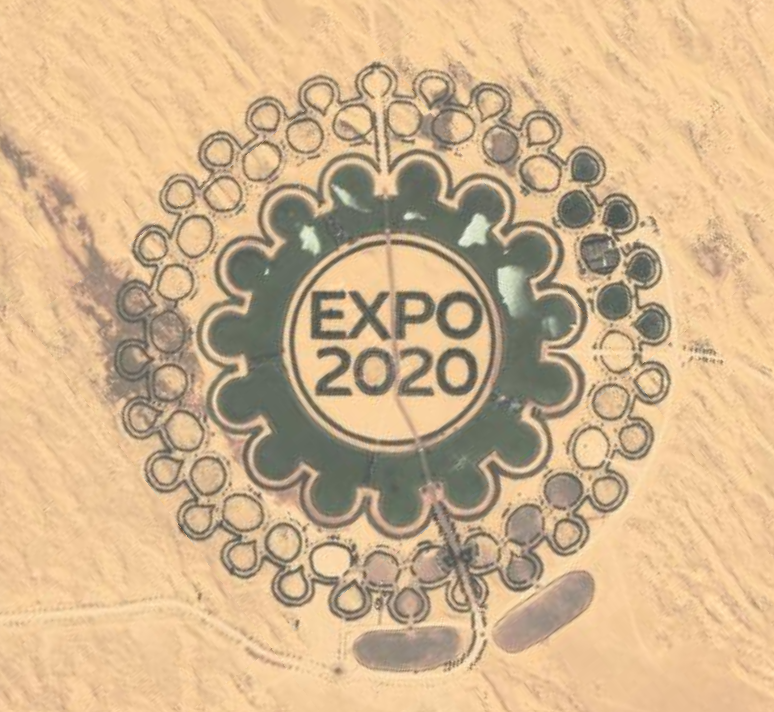
The Expo 2020 Lake

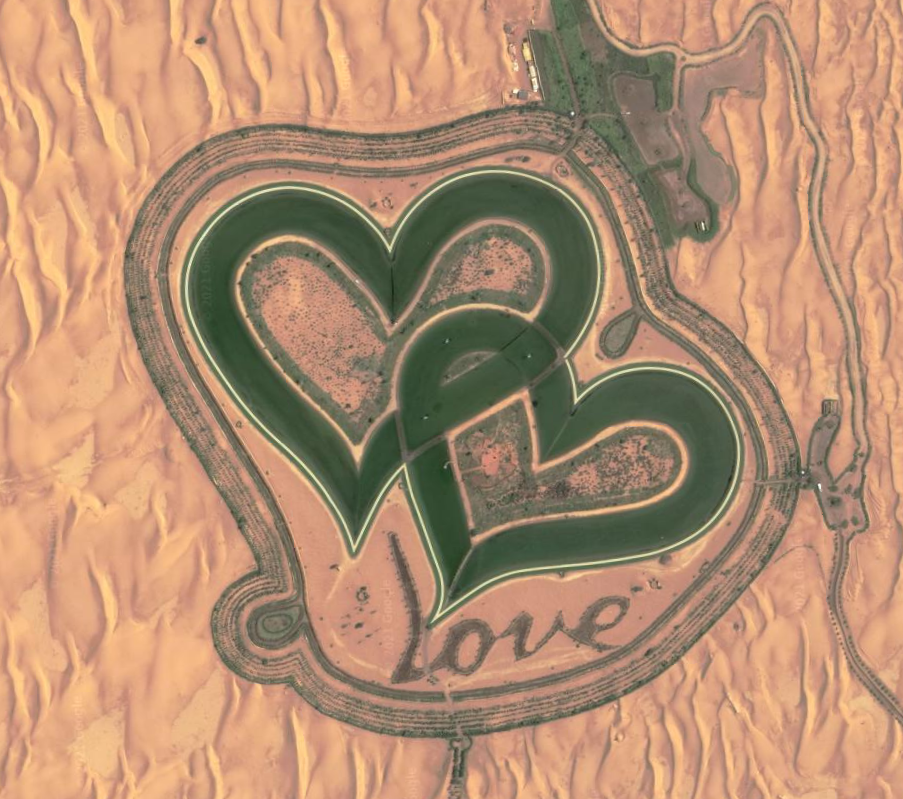
Love Lake

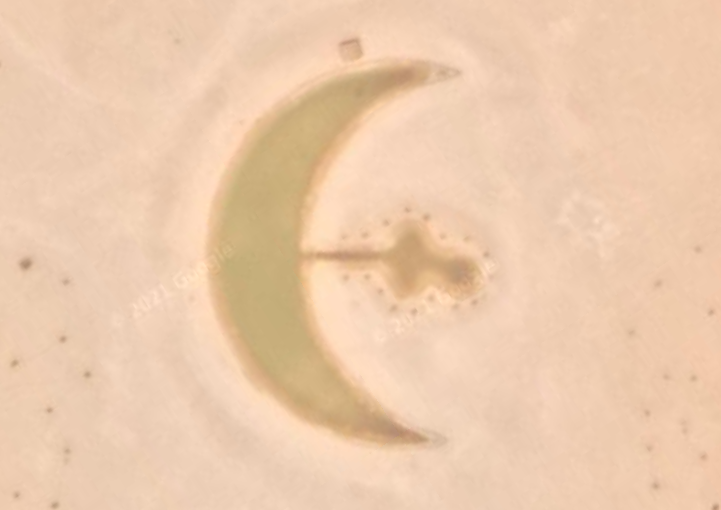
Crescent Moon Lake

== Archaeological site ==
The Saruq Al Hadid Archaeological Site is situated within the Reserve. It was discovered in 2002 by the Ruler of Dubai, Mohammed bin Rashid Al Maktoum, who noticed unusual dune formations when flying over the site in his helicopter. Excavations revealed an extensive Iron Age metallurgical centre, with signs of occupation since the Upper Palaeolithic and Neolithic eras. Artefacts unearthed at Saruq Al Hadid include bronze, copper and iron work, including bronze and iron tools and weapons, gold jewellery, beads, pottery, stoneware and seals. Metalworker's tools and unfinished items show that the site was formerly a production centre.

A collection of artefacts from the site is housed at the Saruq Al-Hadid Archaeology Museum in the Shindaga Heritage area in a traditional barjeel building, which was built in 1928, and which belonged to Sheikh Juma bin Maktoum bin Hasher Al Maktoum.

== See also ==
- Al-Wathba Wetland Reserve, Abu Dhabi
- Dubai Desert Conservation Reserve
- Jebel Hafeet National Park, Abu Dhabi
- Mangrove National Park, Abu Dhabi
- Ras Al Khor, Dubai
- Sir Abu Nu'ayr, Sharjah
- Sir Bani Yas, Abu Dhabi
- Wadi Wurayah, Fujairah
- Wildlife of the United Arab Emirates
