= K. Manikandan =

Indian screenwriter, actor and film director (born 1983)

Kalaimamani K. Manikandan
- Born: 29 September 1987 (age 39); Madras (now Chennai), Tamil Nadu, India
- Occupations: Actor, screenwriter, film director, radio jockey, mimicry artist
- Years active: 2013–present
- Awards: Kalaimamani Award (2023)

K. Manikandan is an Indian screenwriter and actor who works in the Tamil film industry. He is best known of his characters in Jai Bhim (2021), Good Night (2023), Lover (2024) and Kudumbasthan (2025).

== Career ==
Manikandan participated in Kalakka Povathu Yaaru? Season 4 (Vijay TV) and finished as the runner-up of the season. Subsequently, he joined an FM channel as a radio jockey while also dubbing/voice acting for several films and TV shows. He has also written dialogues for Telugu films dubbed in Tamil.

He debuted as a writer with Pizza II: Villa (2013). He made his acting debut with India Pakistan (2015) and played a minor role in the Kadhalum Kadanthu Pogum (2016) directed by Nalan Kumarasamy. Manikandan then played an antagonist in Sri Ganesh's debut directorial venture 8 Thottakkal (2017) alongside M. S. Bhaskar and Lallu. He penned the dialogues for Pushkar–Gayathri's third directorial venture Vikram Vedha (2017) and also played a role of a police constable in the film. In 2018, Pa. Ranjith picked Manikandan for a role in Kaala (2018). He paired with Nivedithaa Sathish in the romantic anthology film Sillu Karupatti (2019), directed by Halitha Shameem. Manikandan received critical acclaim for his role in the film, Aelay (2021).

Manikandan directed an independent film Narai Ezhuthum Suyasaritham (English Title: Endless) starring Delhi Ganesh and himself. The film was selected to participate in Bengaluru International Film Festival (2016) under ‘Indian Cinema Competition’. Endless was one of the four films to be selected for screening at 16th New York Indian Film Festival (2016).

He played the role of Rajakannu in the film Jai Bhim (2021) and won critical acclaim for his portrayal. He played the lead role in movie Good Night (2023) which became an audience favourite. In 2024, he starred in Lover, a romantic drama that received positive reviews for its realistic portrayal of modern relationships. He also joined hands with debutant director Rajeshwar Kalisamy for Kudumbasthan, which was released on 24 January 2025 in theaters to positive reviews from critics, becoming his third consecutive hit as the lead role.

== Filmography ==
=== As actor ===
Year	Film	Role	Notes
2013	Pizza II: Villa	Assistant director	Uncredited role
2014	Irukku Aana Illai	Nainamalai	
2015	India Pakistan	Mani	
2015	Indru Netru Naalai	Film director	
2016	Kadhalum Kadandhu Pogum	Murali	
2017	8 Thottakkal	Jai	
2017	Vikram Vedha	Santhanam	Behindwoods Gold Medal – Best Dialogue Writer
2018	Kaala	Lenin	
2019	Sillu Karupatti	Mukhilan	Anthology film; segment: "Kakka Kadi"
2021	Aelay	Paarthi	Released on Star Vijay
2021	Netrikann	Manikandan	Released on Disney+ Hotstar
2021	Jai Bhim	Rajakannu	Released on Amazon Prime Video; Behindwoods Gold Medal – Best Actor Critics; SIIMA Award for Best Actor(Supporting Role); Tamil Nadu State Film Award - Best Supporting Actor
2022	Narai Ezhudhum Suyasaridham	Manikandan	Directing debut; completed in 2016
2022	Sila Nerangalil Sila Manidhargal	Rajasekar	
2023	Good Night	Choolaimedu Mohan	
2024	Lover	Arun	
2025	Kudumbasthan	Naveen	
2026	Makkal Kaavalan		

=== Web series ===
Year	Film	Role	Platform	Note	Ref
2020	Paava Kadhaigal	Driver	Netflix	under segment Love Panna Uttaranum	
2023	Mathagam	Padalam Sekhar	Disney+ Hotstar		

=== As writer ===
Year	Film	Credited as	Notes
Year	Film	Writer	Notes
2013	Pizza II: Villa	Dialogues	
2016	Narai Ezhuthum Suyasaritham	Yes	
2017	Vikram Vedha	Dialogues	Vijay Award for Best Dialogue Writer
2019	Viswasam	Dialogues	
2019	Thambi	Screenplay	
2022	Sila Nerangalil Sila Manidhargal	Yes	

=== As director ===
Year	Film	Notes
2016	Narai Ezhuthum Suyasaritham	Debut as director

=== Television ===
Year	Title	Role	Network	Notes
2008	Kalakka Povathu Yaaru?	Contestant	Star Vijay	1st Runner-up
2024	Super Singer Season 10	Guest	Star Vijay	

=== As dubbing artist ===
Year	Film	Actor	Role(s)	Notes
2008	Bolt	Todd Cummings, Lino DiSalvo, Tim Mertens	Joey, Vinnie and Bobby	Tamil dubbed version
2024	The Greatest of All Time	Vijayakanth		AI appearance
2025	Kantara: Chapter 1	Rishab Shetty		Tamil dubbed version

== Awards and nominations ==
Year	Award	Category	Film	Result	Ref.
2021	Tamil Nadu State Film Awards	Best Supporting Actor	Jai Bhim	Won	
2021	Filmfare Awards South	Best Actor – Tamil	Jai Bhim	Nominated	
2021	SIIMA Award	SIIMA Award for Best Actor(Supporting Role)	Jai Bhim	Won	
2017	Vijay Awards	Best Dialogue Writer	Vikram Vedha	Nominated	
2017	Behindwoods	Best Dialogue Writer	Vikram Vedha	Won	
2021	Behindwoods	Best Actor Critics	Jai Bhim	Won	

=== Honours ===
- 2023: Received title of Kalaimamani Award by the Government of Tamil Nadu, which is the highest state honour in the field of Arts
