= Sir Bu Nair Festival =

Annual marine heritage festival in Sharjah, United Arab Emirates

Sir Bu Nair Festival is an annual marine and environmental heritage festival held in the Emirate of Sharjah, United Arab Emirates. First staged in 2000, it commemorates the emirate's seafaring and pearl-diving heritage and promotes the conservation of Sir Bu Nair island, a protected nature reserve in the southern Persian Gulf.

== History ==
The festival has been held annually since 2000, when the ruler of Sharjah declared Sir Bu Nair island a protected nature reserve. The 2025 edition marked the festival's 25th (silver jubilee) staging.

== Activities ==
A central feature of the festival is the Sir Bu Nair Dhow Sailing Race, a traditional 60-foot (18 m) dhow race that revives Sharjah's maritime heritage. In the 2025 edition more than 60 dhows and over 1,200 sailors and captains competed for prize money totalling 2.8 million AED. The festival also includes pearl-diving exhibitions, environmental and conservation programmes such as coral-reef restoration, guided tours of the island's nature reserve, and astronomy and stargazing sessions.

== Venue ==
The festival is centred on Sir Bu Nair island, which is opened to the public around the festival period, with additional activities held at Al Heera Beach in Sharjah city.

== See also ==
- Sir Abu Nu'ayr
