= Sillu Karuppatti =

2019 Indian film

- Theatrical release poster
- Directed by: Halitha Shameem
- Written by: Halitha Shameem
- Produced by: Venkatesh Velineni; Suriya (presenter)
- Starring: Samuthirakani; Sunainaa; Manikandan K; Nivedhithaa Sathish; Kravmaga Sreeram; Leela Samson; Sara Arjun; Rahul
- Cinematography: Abinandhan Ramanujam; Manoj Paramahamsa; Vijay Kartik Kannan; Yamini Yagnamurthy
- Edited by: Halitha Shameem
- Music by: Pradeep Kumar
- Production company: Divine Productions
- Distributed by: 2D Entertainment; Sakthi Film Factory
- Release date: 27 December 2019
- Running time: 138 minutes
- Country: India
- Language: Tamil

Sillu Karuppatti (transl. Piece of Palm Jaggery) is a 2019 Indian Tamil-language romantic anthology film written, directed and edited by Halitha Shameem. The film stars Samuthirakani, Sunainaa, Manikandan K, Nivedhithaa Sathish, Kravmaga Sreeram, Leela Samson, Sara Arjun, and Rahul in the lead roles. The anthology consists of four short films based on relationships, which are set against the urban backdrops.

Halitha Shameem conceived the script during the pre-production works of her film Minmini and filming commenced in February 2017. Each short was filmed within 40 days, thus it took about two years to complete the entire film. The music and background score were composed by Pradeep Kumar, whereas cinematography was handled jointly by Abhinandan Ramanujam, Manoj Paramahamsa, Vijay Kartik Kannan and Yamini Yagnamurthy.

Produced by Venkatesh Velineni of Divine Productions, the film was presented by Suriya of 2D Entertainment. The film opened to critical acclaim on 27 December 2019, and was commercially successful. It was also screened at a few film festivals including the Bengaluru International Film Festival and the Toronto Tamil International Film Festival, and was well received by the audiences.

== Plot ==
=== Pink Bag ===
Maanja (Rahul), the teenaged ragpicker, begins to crush on Mity (Sara Arjun), a girl from a wealthy household, after stumbling upon her photo in the garbage from her home. Soon, he begins to collect knickknacks from her garbage everyday – a seemingly broken Walkman that has a recording of her song (she is an aspiring musician) and a ring that holds emotional value. But given their class difference, can he muscle up courage to give these back to her? And will she be able to see his ‘love’?

=== Kakka Kadi ===
Madhu (Nivedhithaa Sathish) and Mugilan (Manikandan K) are two strangers who share cab rides often as they travel along the same route. Mugilan is a white collar employee while Madhu is a fashion designer. Mugilan is diagnosed with scrotum cancer which causes his fiance to call off their engagement, causing Mugilan to lose his cheer. During the cab rides, Mugilan and Madhu form a friendship and through his chemotherapy and treatment sessions get closer to each other. The segment ends with Mugilan's surgery a success and Madhu visiting him in the hospital and confessing her love to Mugilan happily accepting it.

=== Turtles ===
A widower Navaneethan (Kravmaga Sreeram) spots Yashoda (Leela Samson) playing at a park and is instantly smitten by her. They get acquainted at the hospital – they are undergoing a master health checkup – and open up to each other about their respective lives over a turtle walk. While they have no problem beginning a conversation, unlike youngsters who have fallen in love, the doubts that crop up are more or less similar – "does he/she really love me?".

=== Hey Ammu ===
A couple rediscovers passion after 12 years into their marriage when love has all but gotten lost in the mundanities of everyday life. The husband, Dhanapal (Samuthirakani) has no time for his wife, Amudhini (Sunaina) and her needs, both physical and emotional – though he does seem to be a good father to his kids. When Amudhini complains that he barely notices her – when other men compliment her on her new hairstyle – he shoots back that he is going bald but she, too, has not been giving that any notice. And when Amudhini reaches the end of her tether with Dhanapal's uncaring attitude, he tries to compensate by gifting her a virtual assistant – hoping that she would leave him alone as she now has someone to speak to.

== Cast ==
Pink Bag	Kakka Kadi	Turtles	Hey Ammu
Sara Arjun as Mity; Rahul as Maanja; Venkatesh as Tesh; Swati Shree as Jinglee; Swetha as Kausalya	Manikandan K as Mugilan Velayutham; Nivedhithaa Sathish as Madhu	Leela Samson as Yashoda; Kravmaga Sreeram as Navaneethan; Semmalar Annam as Aishwarya	Samuthirakani as Dhanapal; Sunainaa as Amudhini; Sujay Kaviyan as Sujay; Pradhiksha M. as Pradhiksha; Mohammed Imaadhudin as Ajay; Deepa Shankar as the Cashier

== Production ==
=== Development ===
After debuting with the acclaimed children's film Poovarasam Peepee, Halitha Shameem then worked on the scripting of Minmini, which was under pre-production. In February 2017, she started working on an anthology film with Samuthirakani, Leela Samson, Sunainaa, Sara Arjun, K. Manikandan amongst others in leading roles; Halitha stated that the film is filled with nuances picked up from life, reading and lived experiences, further adding that "the film explores the strangeness that is prevalent in the relationships between the protagonists in each of these stories, which cover different age groups". Each short was filmed within 40–45 days and Shameem took two years to complete the entire film.

In July 2017, Halitha finished working on the anthology titled Turtles, featuring Samson and Krav Maga trainer Sreeram as the leads. The anthology features Samson who plays an unmarried, independent woman, and the story traces the bond she shares with the person whom she has rented her house to. The team completed filming two other anthologies during October 2018, and the following week, Halitha filmed the fourth anthology featuring Samuthirakani and Sunainaa.

=== Casting ===
Shameem wrote the script keeping Samuthirakani in mind, as she wanted to portray him as an affectionate, shy middle-aged man, since Samuthirakani was known for his activist and antagonist roles. Yamini Yagnamurthy, who worked as an assistant for P. C. Sreeram, made her debut in cinematography through this short film, whereas the other short films were filmed by Abhinandan Ramanujam, Manoj Paramahamsa and Vijay Kartik Kannan.

=== Filming ===
This short film titled Hey Ammu was completed within 40 days, thus filming wrapped within November 2018.

== Soundtrack ==
Sillu Karuppatti's soundtrack album features only one song titled "Agam Thaanai" composed by Pradeep Kumar, which has lyrics written by the director Halitha Shameem. Kumar also recorded the track with Subiksha Rangarajan, crooning the female portions. The song was released on 20 February 2019, coinciding with the occasion of supermoon. Reviewing the song "The sweet-sounding ballad begins with a hint of accordion, followed by Pradeep and Subiksha Rangarajan's vocals crisply paired with stunning orchestra, stands out in the song".

The original score features music by Pradeep Kumar, who took charge of the composition of the four short films in the anthology. The background score features use of multiple instruments such as guitar, drums, trumpet, tabla, flute, violin, accordion and strings, with the Fames Macedonian Symphonic Orchestra also joining the sessions for the score. Rahul Ramachandran mixed the score and songs and Stuart Bruce took charge of mastering. On 7 August 2020, Think Music released the background score featuring 23 tracks in entirety through multiple platforms.

Track listing
No.	Title	Length
1.	"Souls Predestinately Fused"	1:20
2.	"Maanja's Paradise"	1:11
3.	"Maanja Hears Cuckoo, Feels Love"	1:30
4.	"Accordion Allured Cuckoo"	1:07
5.	"Chirpy Mitty"	1:19
6.	"Light at the End of Tunnel"	2:23
7.	"Celestial Meet Finale"	2:14
8.	"Mukhilan Feels Strange About His Body"	1:12
9.	"Mukhilan Goes Through Agony"	1:19
10.	"Mukhilan Doesn't Get a Response"	1:23
11.	"Madhu Arrives"	1:04
12.	"She Brings Sunshine"	1:07
13.	"Handful of Hope"	1:12
14.	"Heart So Full"	1:22
15.	"Navaneethan Sees Yashodha"	1:11
16.	"Breeze Is Real"	1:33
17.	"Inji Tea with Dignity"	1:25
18.	"Navaneethan Carries Yashodha"	1:14
19.	"Dhanapal Doesn't Give an Ear to Amuthini"	2:00
20.	"Amuthini Confronts Dhanapal"	1:01
21.	"Cat and Mouse inside House"	1:22
22.	"Dhanapal Tears Up Listening To Alexa"	1:04
23.	"Iru Manam Inaindhadhey"	1:09

== Marketing and release ==
The official teaser of the film without featuring any dialogues, was unveiled on 26 December 2018 by actors Vijay Sethupathi and Arya. Shameem says she intentionally decided to cut the teaser as a montage of scenes set to music, and no dialogue stating "This is a conversation-based film, featuring interesting interactions between strangers. But, including dialogues might have revealed the plot or taken over the scenes, which showcase the first meeting/sighting of the character." The teaser opened to positive response from audience.

The film was scheduled for a theatrical release in late 2018, but was postponed indefinitely since no takers were approached to distribute the film. Suriya who released the film's trailer on 18 December 2019, also announced that he will present the film through 2D Entertainment, as well as Sakthivelan acquired the distribution rights under Sakthi Film Factory banner. The film released on 27 December 2019, and became a commercial success at the box office after running for over 50 days.

Sillu Karuppatti was premiered at the Bengaluru International Film Festival on 4 March 2020, and also at the Toronto Tamil Festival in September 2020. The film was also streamed via Netflix in April 2020.

== Reception ==
On the review aggregator website Rotten Tomatoes, 100% of 5 critics' reviews are positive, with an average rating of 8/10.

M. Suganth of The Times of India gave the film 4 out of 5 stars and wrote that "Sillu Karuppatti is so lovingly crafted with endearing performances, aesthetic visuals (though four cinematographers have worked on it, the film does an amazing job in keeping the visual tone consistent) and emotive music (by Pradeep Kumar) that superbly complement the perceptive writing. S. Subhakeerthana of The Indian Express gave 3.5 out of 5 stating "Don't miss these cleverly-cut stories, which will engage deeply with you". S. Srivatsavan of The Hindu wrote "Halitha Shameem captures the essense [sic] of love through four shorts — each of which deals with different phases of life".

Janani K of India Today gave 4 out of 5 and summarised "Sillu Karupatti may be a film about love, but it is the humour that sets it apart from other films of the ilk. If you look past some crazy coincidences, this is a bittersweet film which will make you smile throughout reminding you to live the moment." Anjana Shekar of The News Minute gave 3 out of 5 stating "The film manages to keep us engaged, while smoothly veering away from cliches." Baradwaj Rangan of Film Companion wrote "The episodes are interconnected through people and objects and even stray animals and birds. These connections don't appear contrived, because the basic thread is... human connection."

Sify gave 3.5 out of 5 stating it as "A well-written feel-good film". Behindwoods gave 3 out of 5 and stated "Sillu Karuppatti is a positive and sweet concoction of lovingly made stories. Do not miss this entertaining gem." Indiaglitz gave the film 3.25 out of 5 and stated "Sillu Karuppatti is a completely positive, refreshing, must watch entertainer that'll make you fall in love with the characters, celebrate love, and comes as a breath of fresh air amidst routine mass entertainers."

== Awards and nominations ==
Year	Award	Category	Nominee	Result	Ref.
2020	JFW Movie Awards	JFW Women Director of the Year	Halitha Shameem	Won	
2020	Toronto Tamil Film Festival	Best Experimental Feature Film (Jury Award)	Sillu Karuppatti	Won	
2020	Toronto Tamil Film Festival	Best Feature Film Women Director	Halitha Shameem	Won	
