= Love Lake, Dubai =

Coordinates: 24°50′17.16″N 55°24′17.28″E

Love Lake
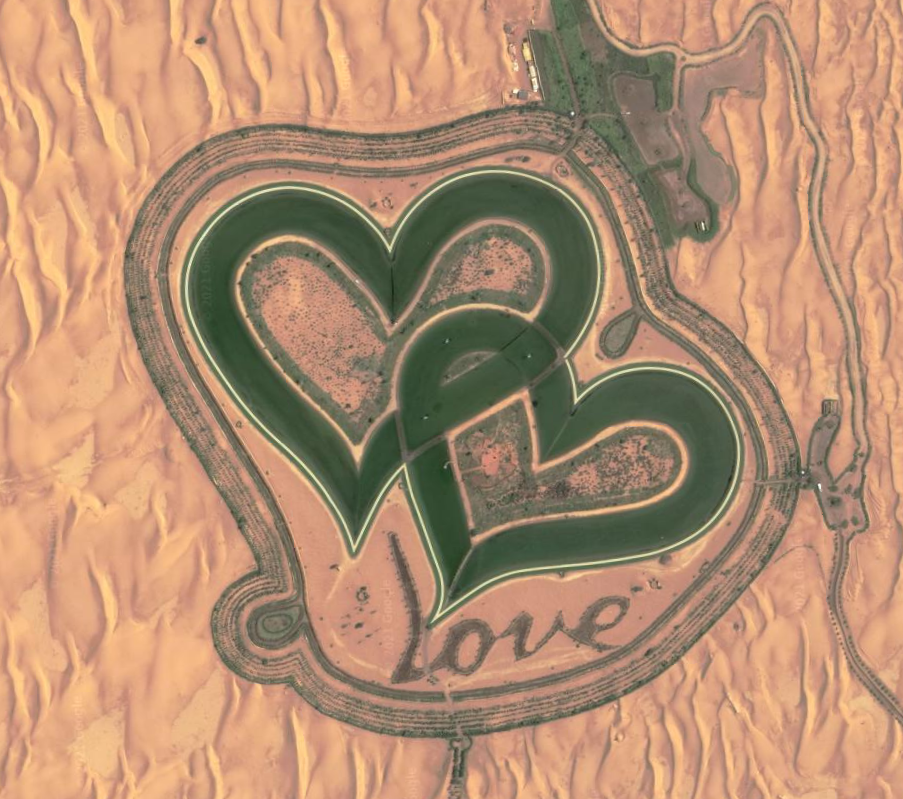
- Love Lake, Dubai
- Location: Saih Al Salam, Al Marmoom Desert Conservation Reserve, Dubai, United Arab Emirates
- Type: Reservoir
- Interactive map of Love Lake

Love Lake is an artificial lake shaped like a heart. It is part of the Qudra Lakes in Saih Al Salam, Dubai, United Arab Emirates. There are mesquite trees all around the lake. This is a popular spot in the Al Marmoum area of Bab Al Shams Desert.

== Overview ==
Love Lake, also referred to as the "Heart Lake", resembles an oasis nestled in the midst of the desert. Its central feature consists of two massive interconnected heart-shaped lakes. On the western shore of the lakes, trees have been planted to spell out the word "Love", while the winding pathways on the eastern shore create an image of lovers embracing. Visitors can see various local birds and fish, including Japanese orange and gold fish, which swim in the clear lakes.

The Love Lake opened to the public in November 2018 and gained widespread recognition through an Instagram post by Hamdan bin Mohammed Al Maktoum, the Crown Prince of Dubai.

This man-made oasis is situated within the Al Marmoom Desert Conservation Reserve and is a part of the artificial desert wetland, Al Qudra Lake. Located at a considerable distance from the city, with a linear distance of approximately 30 kilometers from the outskirts of the Dubai city, it is most conveniently accessed by self-driving.
