= Aelay =

2021 film by Halitha Shameem

- Poster
- Genre: Comedy drama
- Written by: Halitha Shameem
- Directed by: Halitha Shameem
- Starring: Samuthirakani; K. Manikandan
- Music by: Aruldev
- Country of origin: India
- Original language: Tamil

Production
- Producers: S. Sashikanth; Chakravarthy Ramachandra; Pushkar–Gayathri
- Cinematography: Theni Eswar
- Editors: Raymond Derrick Crasta; Halitha Shameem
- Production companies: YNOT Studios; Reliance Entertainment; Wallwatcher Films

Original release
- Network: Star Vijay
- Release: 28 February 2021

Aelay is a 2021 Indian Tamil-language comedy drama television film written and directed by Halitha Shameem, and produced by S. Sashikanth and Ramachandra of YNOT Studios while creative produced by Pushkar–Gayathri of Wallwatcher Films. Co-produced by Reliance Entertainment, The film stars Samuthirakani and K. Manikandan, and has music composed by Kaber Vasuki and Aruldev, with cinematography handled by Theni Eswar and editing done by Shameem and Raymond Derrick Crasta respectively.

The film was scheduled for theatrical release on 12 February 2021, but the producers later opted for a direct-to-television premiere on Star Vijay on 28 February 2021 and internationally on Netflix on 5 March 2021.

== Plot ==
An unexpected life event forces a young man to reconsider the past and his opinions about his father, who was an ice-cream seller.

== Cast ==
- Samuthirakani as Muthukkutty and Sudhakar (Imbuttu Kanji)
- K. Manikandan as Parthi
- Madhumathi as Nachiya
- Deepa Shankar as village school teacher
- Sana Udhyakumar as Parthi's elder sister (Meena)
- Sudharshan Gandhi as Parthi's friend

== Production ==
In May 2019, YNOT Studios announced their collaboration with director duo Pushkar–Gayathri's newly launched production studio Wallwatcher Films, for Halitha Shameem's new project titled Aelay. Both the directors also joined the film's team as the creative director, with Shameem revealed that she had written the script nine years back, and was waiting for the right producer. She earlier worked as an assistant to Pushkar and Gayathri, whom agreed to produce the film after her narration. The film was touted to be a neo-realistic comedy set in rural areas, with the relationship dynamics between a father and son at its core. Shameem decided to cast Samuthirakani and Manikandan, whom were a part of the director's Sillu Karuppatti (2019), essaying the roles of father and son, whereas the rest of the cast were non-actors from the village of Manjunayakanpatti in Dindigul district. Principal photography began in Palani on 3 May 2019, where the makers planned to shoot the film in a single stretch, and wrapped on 1 July 2019.

== Soundtrack ==
Aelay

Soundtrack album by Kaber Vasuki, Aruldev
- Released: 1 February 2021
- Recorded: 2020
- Genre: Feature film soundtrack
- Length: 15:03
- Language: Tamil
- Label: Sony Music
- Producers: Kaber Vasuki; Aruldev

The songs are composed by Kaber Vasuki and Aruldev. The original score is composed by Aruldev, as he earlier worked with Shameem in her debut film Poovarasam Peepee (2014). The soundtrack album features six songs with lyrics written by Kaber Vasuki, Halitha Shameem, M. K. Kadal Vendhan and K. Chitrasenan. The album was released by Sony Music on 1 February 2021.

Track listing
No.	Title	Lyrics	Music	Singer(s)	Length
1.	"Aelay"	–	Aruldev	Aruldev	2:14
2.	"Ettuthikkum Oorum"	M. K. Kadal Vendhan	Aruldev	M. K. Kadal Vendhan	2:02
3.	"Kooduvittu"	K. Chitrasenan	Aruldev	K. Chitrasenan	1:57
4.	"Magaraasa"	Kaber Vasuki	Kaber Vasuki	Kaber Vasuki	2:10
5.	"Muthukutti Settai"	Halitha Shameem	Kaber Vasuki	Alexander Babu	2:45
6.	"Seevanukke"	Halitha Shameem	Kaber Vasuki	Yogi Sekar, Roja Adithya	3:55
Total length:					15:03

== Release ==
The film was initially scheduled for a theatrical release in September 2019, but was postponed due to the post-production delays and the COVID-19 pandemic. The official trailer of the film was released on the occasion of Republic Day, 26 January 2021 and the film's release date of 12 February 2021 was announced.

A day before the scheduled release, the makers withdrew plans for theatrical release and further announced that the film will be aired directly through Star Vijay on 28 February 2021. Exhibitors demanded a film should have its streaming premiere only after 30-days of theatrical run, this was one of the reasons that the makers went for a straight-to-television premiere. After its television premiere, the film began streaming via Netflix from 5 March 2021.

== Critical reception ==
M. Suganth of The Times of India called out "Aelay" as "a journey that leaves you with a smile even if the ride was sort of bumpy for some parts", giving 3 out of 5 stars for the film. Avinash Ramachandran of Cinema Express also gave 3 out of 5, writing "The film stays afloat, courtesy its efficient humour, some good performances from the leads, and impressive music".

Sify called the film "a breezy feel-good drama", adding "it makes you smile in several places but it falls short due to the overstretched second half and climax.". Srinivasa Ramanujam from The Hindu noted "director Halitha Shameem’s latest offering lacks pace but the performances and characterisation make up for it." Despite criticising its lengthy pace, Haricharan Pudipeddi of Hindustan Times called Aelay as a "fun, sweet film that gets so much right about life in a small village and their tradition". Reviewing for Film Companion, Baradwaj Rangan stated the film as watchable, despite its issues. He wrote "There’s always something fresh and interesting and “quirky” enough to match the score, like the father and son giving up a chase while halfway up a tree. But you wish Halitha had leaned one way and stayed that course".
