= Malli Pelli (2023 film) =

2023 Indian romantic drama film

- Theatrical release poster
- Directed by: M. S. Raju
- Written by: M. S. Raju
- Produced by: Naresh
- Starring: Naresh; Pavitra Lokesh; Vanitha Vijayakumar
- Cinematography: M. N. Balreddy
- Edited by: Junaid Siddiqui
- Music by: Songs: Suresh Bobbili; Aruldev; Score: Aruldev
- Production company: Vijaya Krishna Movies
- Release date: 26 May 2023
- Country: India
- Language: Telugu

Malli Pelli (transl. Remarriage) is a 2023 Indian Telugu-language romantic drama film written and directed by M. S. Raju. The film stars Naresh, Pavitra Lokesh and Vanitha Vijayakumar with Jayasudha, Sarath Babu (in his posthumous film role), Ananya Nagalla, Roshan, Ravivarma, and Annapurna in supporting roles. The story of Naresh and Pavithra's actual marriage is partially romanticized in the film.

== Cast ==
- Naresh as Narendra (based on Naresh himself)
  - Varshith Vemuri as child Narendra
- Pavitra Lokesh as Parvati (based on Pavitra herself)
  - Ananya Nagalla as young Parvati
- Vanitha Vijayakumar as Soumya Sethupathi (based on Ramya Raghupathi, Naresh's ex-wife)
- Jayasudha as Narendra's mother (based on Vijaya Nirmala)
- Sarath Babu as Narendra's stepfather (based on Krishna)
- Ravi Varma as Phaneendra
  - Roshan Basheer as young Phaneendra
- Annapurna as Annapoornamma
- Bhadram

== Production ==
The film was produced by Naresh under his banner, Vijaya Krishna Movies. The title Matthe Maduve was given to the Kannada dubbed version of the film. The film's cinematography was done by Bal Reddy, and Junaid Siddiqui handled the editing of the film.

The first-look poster was released on 24 March 2023. The teaser was released on 21 April 2023. The trailer was released on 11 May 2023.

== Music ==
Suresh Bobbili and Aruldev composed the songs for the film, while Aruldev composed the background score.

Malli Pelli

Soundtrack album by Suresh Bobbili and Aruldev Background Score: Aruldev
- Released: 2023
- Recorded: 2023
- Genre: Feature film soundtrack
- Length: 26:28
- Language: Telugu
- Label: Aditya Music
- Producers: Suresh Bobbili, Aruldev

Aruldev chronology
Aelay (2021)	Malli Pelli (2023)	Golmaal (TBA)

Suresh Bobbili chronology
Chor Bazaar (2022)	Malli Pelli (2023)
External audio
- Malli Pelli - Full Songs Jukebox on YouTube

Track listing
No.	Title	Lyrics	Music	Singer(s)	Length
1.	"Urime Kaalama"	Ananta Sriram	Suresh Bobbili	Anurag Kulkarni	3:45
2.	"Ra Ra Hussooru Nattho"	Ananta Sriram	Aruldev	Indu Sanath	2:55
3.	"Kaveri Gaalila"	Anantha Sriram	Suresh Bobbili	Naresh Iyer	4:00
4.	"Akashame"	Ananta Sriram	Suresh Bobbili	Santhosh Venky	2:58
5.	"Sita Kalyana Vaibhogame"	—	Aruldev	Indu Sanath, Kamalaja, Aparna Harikumar	5:07
6.	"Tumhe Mein (Stage Song)"	—	Aruldev	Jeemon K. J.	3:33
7.	"Fabulous Day"	Kamalaja	Aruldev	Indu Sanath, Kamalaja, Aparna Harikumar	2:38
8.	"Exposure Of Espousal-Fusion Music"	—	Aruldev	T. S. Ayyappan	3:56
Total length:					26:28

== Release ==
The film was released on 26 May 2023. Ramya Ragupathi, Naresh's ex-wife, filed a plea to prevent the film's release and to stop its distribution, claiming that it portrays her in a negative way. However, the film was released as scheduled.

=== Home media ===
Online streaming rights to the film were acquired by Amazon Prime Video.

== Reception ==
Neeshita Nyayapati of The Times of India gave it 2.5 out of 5 stars and wrote, "Malli Pelli is the tale of two consenting adults who happen to fall in love and face judgement from society. Watch it if that’s your cup of tea." Abhilasha Cherukuri of Cinema Express gave it 3 out of 5 stars and wrote, "Malli Pelli surpasses the expectations it sets, surprising its viewers with sincerity on one end and unabashed glee on the other."

Avad Mohammad of OTTplay gave it 3 out of 5 stars and wrote, "MS Raju has neatly put his point across that love can be felt at any age in life. However, the film has issues in the second half. The flashback of Pavitra Lokesh is a tad boring and derails the flow of the film."

Satya Pulagam of ABP Live Telugu gave the film 2.5 out of 5 stars and stated, "How did Pavitra and Naresh start dating? How do they get along with their life partners? The scenes are interesting." A critic from Sakshi gave the film a rating of 2.5 stars out of 5 and gave a mixed review.

Kiran Kumar of News18 Telugu gave it 2.25 out of 5 stars and stated, "The life of Naresh is the subject of the controversial film Malli Pelli. The film contains issues like a sluggish narration and lack commercial values."
