= Makkal Kaavalan =

Upcoming Indian Tamil language action drama thriller film

- Directed by: Santhosh Kumar
- Written by: Santhosh Kumar
- Produced by: Ananya Birla; Priti Shahani; Aditi Anand; Pa. Ranjith
- Starring: K. Manikandan; Divya Sripada; Sabumon Abdusamad; Vagai Chandrasekhar; Jensan Diwakar
- Cinematography: Pratheepan Selvaratnam
- Edited by: Arul Moses
- Music by: Nivas K. Prasanna
- Production companies: Birla Studios; Neelam Studios
- Release date: December 4, 2026
- Country: India
- Language: Tamil

Makkal Kaavalan (transl. People's bodyguard) is an upcoming Indian Tamil language action drama film written and directed by Santhosh Kumar. The film stars K. Manikandan in the lead role, alongside Divya Sripada, Vagai Chandrasekar and an ensemble supporting cast. It is produced by Ananya Birla, Aditi Anand, Priti Shahani and Pa. Ranjith under the banners of Birla Studios and Neelam Studios. The film is scheduled to be released theatrically on 4 December 2026.

== Cast ==
- K. Manikandan
- Divya Sripada
- Vagai Chandrasekar
- A. Venkatesh
- R. K. Vijaymurugan
- Shanmugam Muthusamy
- Sabumon Abdusamad
- Unnimaya Prasad
- Jenson Diwakar
- Lallu
- Gemini Mani
- Raghu

== Production ==
The film was announced under the title Makkal Kaavalan in August 2026, with Santhosh Kumar as writer and director. Pa. Ranjith and Aditi Anand are producing the film through Neelam Studios, in collaboration with Birla Studios, led by Ananya Birla and Priti Shahani.

The film's first-look poster featured K. Manikandan portraying a police officer against a backdrop of fiery ruins. Manikandan described the project as an action drama rooted in cultural and ethnic disputes.

== Release ==
Makkal Kaavalan is scheduled to be released theatrically on 4 December 2026.
