= Zirku Island =

Island in the United Arab Emirates

Zirku
Native name: زركوه
- Location within United Arab Emirates

Geography
- Location: Al Dhafra, Abu Dhabi
- Coordinates: 24°52′42″N 53°4′30″E
- Area: 7.47 km^{2} (2.88 sq mi)
- Highest elevation: 161 m (528 ft)

Administration
- United Arab Emirates
- Emirate: Abu Dhabi

Zirku Island (Arabic: زركوه) is an island in the Persian Gulf about 87 miles (140 km) northwest of the city of Abu Dhabi and belongs to the United Arab Emirates. The island is 7.47 km^{2} (2.88 sq mi) in size and has a height of 161 meters (528 ft).

Until 1978, Zirku was a refuge for cormorants and other birds until the Zakum Development Company began development for oil processing. Today there are oil refining facilities, a petroleum terminal and an airport on the island. More recently, ZADCO has commissioned studies to study biodiversity on the island. According to a report from August 2015, more than 1000 people live and work on the island. Zirku has no freshwater resources of its own and was therefore never naturally inhabited.

Its beaches are known to support the most Hawksbill turtle nests of all the nesting beaches in the Emirate of Abu Dhabi.

The weather in Zirku Island is typical of a desert climate with hot summers and mild winters. Key weather characteristics include:

- Summer temperatures: 35–45 °C (June–September).
- Winter temperatures: 15–25°C (December–February).
- Wind speed: Average 15–20 knots, with seasonal variations.
- Rainfall: Rare, mostly in winter months.
- Humidity levels: High, especially in summer.

== See also ==
- Sir Abu Nuʽayr
