= Aruldev =

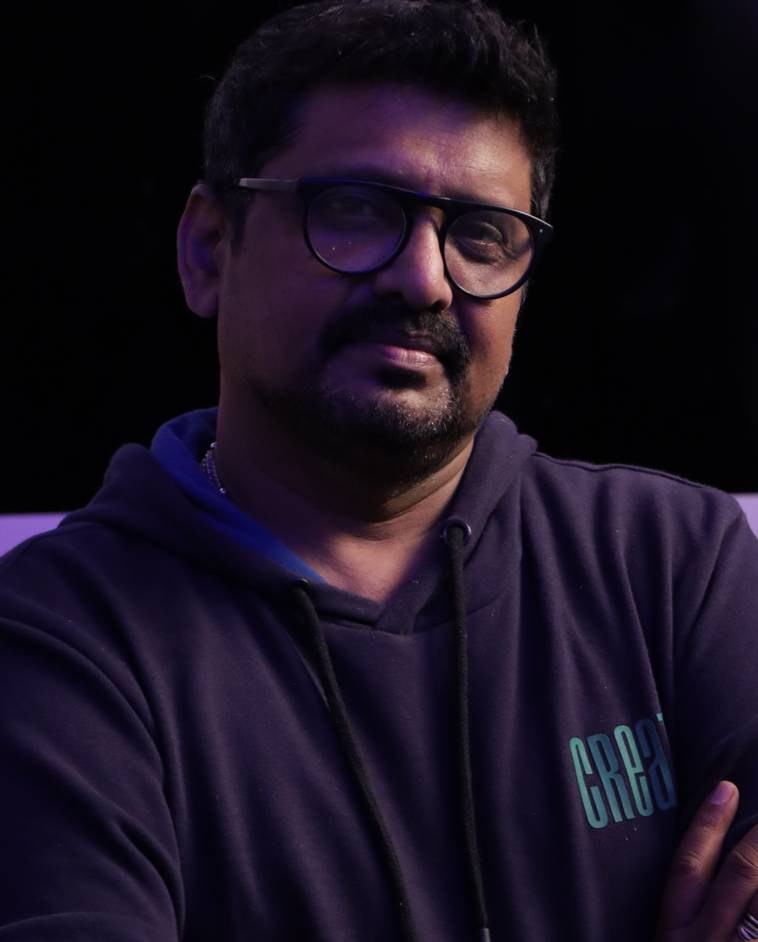

Background information
- Born: Madurai, Tamil Nadu, India
- Genre: Film score
- Occupation: Music director
- Instruments: Keyboard, piano, mirudangam
- Years active: 2000–present
- Labels: Sony Music India; T-Series; Think Music India; Divo; Junglee; Aditya Music; Tips; Saregama

Aruldev is a music director from Chennai, Tamil Nadu. He has scored music predominantly for Tamil-language films.

== Early life ==
Aruldev is an Indian film music composer from Madurai. His father was an accordion player and an orchestra organizer.

== Career ==
Aruldev worked under Vidyasagar as a keyboard player.

The first movie that Aruldev was signed for was Potta Potti (Patta Patti 50-50) in 2010. Aruldev teamed up with director Halitha Shameem on Poovarasam Pee Pee, which was launched on 14 May 2014. Behindwoods called the album "sweetly adventurous in its music". Chennai Times rated the album of 3.5/5 and said, "Aruldev has given listeners a slice of everything for Poovarasam Peepee. He has kept the album simple with likable tunes, yet he keeps the theme of the film intact". MilliBlog said, "Aruldev finally arrives, putting behind his limited, non-descript repertoire".

The movie was released on 30 May 2014 with a positive reviews from critics. BehindWoods.com rated the movie 3/5 and praised Aruldev for his songs. FoundPix rated the movie as 8.6 and said the "songs are fantastic and unique. Aruldev's background music deserves a special mention". The film was selected for Chennai International Film Festival 2014.

Aruldev joined with Kannada film director, Pon Kumaran to work with the Tamil movie Golmaal. Aruldev roped in Mangli a famous Telugu folk singer to make her Kollywood debut with Golmaal.

Aruldev scored the music for the Telugu movie Malli Pelli.

== Discography ==
Year	Title	Language	Songs	Background score	Notes
2011	Patta Patti 50-50	Tamil	Yes	Yes	
2014	Pattaya Kelappanum Pandiya	Tamil	Yes	Yes	
2014	Poovarasam Peepee	Tamil	Yes	Yes	
2015	Kaththukkutti	Tamil	Yes	Yes	
2017	Paakanum Pola Irukku	Tamil	Yes	Yes	
2018	Mohini	Tamil	Yes (theme song only)	Yes	
2020	Kabeerinte Dhivasangal	Malayalam	Yes	No	
2020	Enai Sudum Pani	Tamil	Yes	Yes	
2020	Mirugaa	Tamil	Yes	Yes	
2020	Garjana	Telugu	Yes	Yes	
2020	Ampere Franco	Malayalam	Yes	Yes	
2021	Aelay	Tamil	Yes	Yes (Situation Songs)	
2021	Ambalamukkile Visheshangal	Malayalam	Yes	No	
2022	Mofussil	Tamil	Yes	Yes	
2023	Malli Pelli	Telugu	Yes	Yes	
2025	Ambalamukkile Visheshangal †	Malayalam	Yes	No	One song
TBA	Golmaal †	Tamil	Yes	Yes	

=== As singer ===
Film	Song	Language	Notes
Potta Potti	"Ithuvarai Ithuvarai"	Tamil	
Kaththukkutti	"Nenjukulla"	Tamil	
Album	"Stylachiye" தமிழச்சியே	Tamil	

=== Keyboard player ===
Work	Language	Notes
Chandramukhi	Tamil	
Beyond the Soul	English	
Baahubali: The Conclusion	Telugu	
Mahanati	Telugu	
O Baby! Yentha Sakkagunnave	Telugu	
Charlie Chaplin 2	Tamil	
Bhaskar Oru Rascal	Tamil	
Gaddalakonda Ganesh	Telugu	
Iddari Lokam Okate	Telugu	
Paramapadham Vilayattu	Tamil	
Liger	Hindi & Telugu	
Karthikeya 2	Telugu	
Waltair Veerayya	Telugu	
Chandramukhi 2	Tamil	
Operation Valentine	Telugu & Hindi	
Mr. Bachchan	Telugu	

=== Independent singles ===
Song	Language	Notes
"Stylachiye" தமிழச்சியே	Tamil	
"Tribute to Kalam"	Tamil	
"Naam Thamizhar Anthem"	Tamil	
"கலைகளின் தலைவன்"	Tamil	
"Kannaale Pesi Pesi" (Amazon Prime & Saregama)	Tamil	

=== Short films ===
Year	Title	Language	Notes
2014	Vittil Poochikal	Tamil	
2016	Vaadi Vaasal Jallikattu	Tamil	
2017	Masculine Malnutrition	English	
2017	Break Up - Many a times you breakdown	Tamil	
2018	My Dear Friend	English	
2019	Inside the Kitchen of Her Mind	Tamil	
2020	Father's Day	Tamil	
2020	Kadavul Irukkaanda Kumaru	Tamil	
2021	Sweet Biriyani	Tamil	
2021	Recover Mental Health Awareness	Tamil	

=== Ad jingles ===
Work	Language	Notes
Jannal Samukathin Salaram - Jannal Magazine	Tamil	
Meat and Eat	Tamil	
Zee Telugu	Telugu	
CMR Shopping Mall	Telugu	
