= Kaththukkutti =

2015 Indian film by Saravanan

- Directed by: Era. Saravanan
- Produced by: R. Ramkumar
- Starring: Narain; Srushti Dange; Soori
- Cinematography: Santhosh Sriram
- Music by: Aruldev
- Production company: OWN Productions
- Release date: 9 October 2015
- Country: India
- Language: Tamil

Kaththukkutti is a 2015 Indian Tamil language romantic comedy film directed by R. Saravanan and produced by Ramkumar. The film stars Narain and Srushti Dange, with Soori in another pivotal role. The film was released in October 2015 to positive reviews but low reception from audience.

== Plot ==
Arivazhagan, an irresponsible youngster, receives an opportunity to contest the elections. So, he decides to mend his ways and become a better person.

== Cast ==
- Narain as Arivazhagan
- Srushti Dange as Bhuvana
- Soori as Ginger
- Tulasi as Arivazhagan's mother
- Raja as Bhuvana's father
- V. Gnanavel as Maavattam
- K. G. Mohan as Manjapai
- Kadhal Saravanan
- Theni Murugan
- Nadhaswaram Kannan
- Devipriya as herself
- Maran as Arivazhagan's friend
- Sandhya (special appearance) in an item number

== Production ==
Production on the film began quietly in late 2013, with debutant director Saravanan opting to give actor Narain an opportunity to make a comeback, following a hiatus after Mugamoodi (2012). The film also features Jayaraj, brother of actor-director Bharathiraja, who makes his acting debut. Sandhya signed on to appear in the film in June 2014 and would appear as one of the two pairs for Soori in the film, the other being Devipriya.

== Soundtrack ==
Music is composed by Aruldev

Track listing
No.	Title	Writer(s)	Singer(s)	Length
1.	"Oru Round"	R Saravanan/ Vasanth BalaKrishnan	Velmurugan, Pavan, Malathy Lakshman	04:23
2.	"Karuppu vella"	R Saravanan	Hema	04:31
3.	"Nenjukkulla"	R Saravanan	Aruldev	03:03
4.	"Kalakkattu Kannaala"	Snehan	Ranjith, Cicily	06:34
5.	"Karnadagathu"	Algate Azhakesh	Algate Azhakesh	05:34
6.	"Youtube Trend"	Vasanth Balakrishnan	Abishek Dharshan	03:55

== Reception ==
Sify wrote "The only problem with Kathukutty is the low production values and music, cinematography and editing are strictly average. Nevertheless the film has its good moments and can be watched once.You will not be disappointed.describing the film as "Above Average".
