= Al Layan Oasis =

Proposed eco-tourism development in Dubai, UAE

- Interactive map of Al Layan Oasis
- Location: Al Marmoom Desert Conservation Reserve
- Coordinates: 24°49′25.7″N 55°22′34.3″E
- Status: Construction not started
- Constructed: No
- Use: Eco-tourism project

Companies
- Developer: Dubai Municipality
- Proposed: February 2026

Al Layan Oasis (Arabic: واحة الليان) is a proposed eco-tourism and desert recreation project in Dubai, United Arab Emirates. Located within the Al Marmoom Desert Conservation Reserve, the development will span 10 million square feet (930,000 m^{2}) and cost AED 4 billion (US$ 1.08 billion).

== Background ==
The project was announced by Mohammed bin Rashid Al Maktoum, the ruler of Dubai, in February 2026. The development forms a part of Dubai Municipality's Blue and Green Roadmap 2030, which aims to increase the amount of natural and green areas in the emirate.

== Development ==
The project will be centered around a large 2.5 million square feet (230,000 m^{2}) artificial lake. The development will be organised into four main zones:

- Gathering Oasis: This section will contain an open-air cinema, an amphitheatre, a food truck plaza and event spaces.
- Family Oasis: This will contain 28 shaded rest areas, play zones and picnic spaces.
- Camping Oasis: An area with around 100 caravan camping sites, along with a visitor centre with conservation exhibits.
- Recreation Oasis: It will contain retail and dining locations, along with other outdoor recreational activities.

The oasis will be supported by 14 kilometres of walking and cycling tracks, including four kilometres of elevated pathways to provide views of the desert landscape and to connect with the rest of the trails in the Marmoom reserve.

=== Economic significance ===
According to reports, 3.9 million square feet (365,000 m^{2}) of the development has been set aside for private investment. Once complete, the development is expected to attract 300,000 visitors a year.
