= Firdaus Orchestra =

All-women musical ensemble in the UAE

Firdaus Orchestra is an all-women musical ensemble in the United Arab Emirates (UAE). The orchestra is named Firdaus, meaning "paradise" in Arabic. It was founded in 2020 by the UAE Minister of State for International Cooperation for performances during Expo City Dubai.

== History ==
Firdaus Orchestra was founded by Reem Al Hashimy, the Minister of State for International Cooperation of the United Arab Emirates. Mentored by Indian composer A.R. Rahman, the orchestra plays a mix of classical Western, international pop, film scores, and fusion music. In their performances they have presented symphonic compositions by as well as Western orchestral works.

As of 2021, Firdaus Orchestra comprised some 50 women musicians from 25 nations of the Arab region and beyond, some of whom are classically trained. The musicians perform on Middle Eastern instruments such as qanun, buzuq, ney, oud, daf, darbuka and Indian sitar, along with Western orchestral instruments.

In its second season the orchestra accompanied women artists including Beyonce, Sunmisola Agebebi, Katrina Velarde, as well as male singer Atif Aslam from Pakistan.

== Selected performances and recordings ==
- Digital release of 'Moonlight Sonata' conceptualized by A.R. Rahman.
- Performance for International Women's Day on 8 March 2022 with Qawwali Project, Nabyla Maan, Rakshita Suresh, Khatija Rahman, Raheema Rahman, Sucheta Satish.
- Expo 2020 Dubai Closing Ceremony with Christina Aguilera, Nora Jones and Grammy Winner Yo Yo Ma.
- Recording for Madras Talkies movies directed by Mani Ratnam, PS I and PS II.

== The Reinvent Series ==
The Reinvent Series was launched on World Music Day (21 June 2023) with a concert performance including Middle Eastern instruments and captured for a 50-minutes film featuring rearranged pieces by German classical composer Johannes Brahms. On this occasion, Firdaus Orchestra performed four of Brahms' compositions: Hungarian Dances, Clarinet Quintet in B minor, Symphony No. 3 and Variations on a Theme by Haydn.
