= Manoj Paramahamsa =

Indian cinematographer

- Born: Chennai, Tamil Nadu, India
- Occupations: Cinematographer, Film producer , Chairman M.G.R. Government Film and Television Training Institute
- Years active: 2008–present

Manoj Paramahamsa is an Indian cinematographer, who has worked in Tamil, Telugu and Malayalam films.He have done 25 films cinematography. His notable works include Eeram (2009), Ye Maaya Chesave (2010), Nanban (2012), Race Gurram (2014), Radhe Shyam (2022), and Leo (2023).

== Career ==
He was born in Chennai, Tamil Nadu. His father U. V. Babu, has directed more than half-a-dozen films in Telugu and Paramahamsa has said that "he was the one who wanted me to become a cinematographer". He would accompany his father to shoots and said that he was "fascinated by cinematography, the mystery of the camera and lights".

Educated at the M.G.R. Government Film and Television Training Institute of Tamil Nadu in Chennai, he received his early training from the cinematographer S. Saravanan. Paramahamsa started his career by assisting in films such as Pammal K. Sambandam, Arasatchi, Priyamana Thozhi, Madhurey, Thirupaachi and Thirupathi, as well as other films in Telugu, Malayalam and Tamil, before becoming independent. He assisted him for seven years.

Paramahamsa's debut film was Eeram directed by Arivazhagan, and produced by noted director S. Shankar under his banner S Pictures. He received wide critical praise for his work in the film. Sify wrote, "it is Manoj Paramahamsa's camera which is the real hero of the film. As a cameraman he is able to give the entire film the hazy blue look using Cyan color by the removal of red from white light for the first time in Tamil cinema, creating the eerie atmosphere and stillness against the continuous beating of the rains". Similarly, Rediff wrote, "Manoj Paramahamsa's camerawork is refreshing: somber and serious, with rain always threatening in some form in the present; normal and sunny in the Trichy flashback sequences".

In 2010, he worked on Gautham Vasudev Menon's romance film Vinnaithaandi Varuvaayaa and its Telugu remake Ye Maaya Chesave, winning the Filmfare Award for Best Cinematographer - South for the latter. He also handled cinematography for Menon's psychological thriller, Nadunisi Naaygal starring Sameera Reddy. He worked in the remake of 3 Idiots in Tamil, Nanban, which was directed by S. Shankar.

He turned producer with the adventure film Poovarasam Peepee. He has worked with Vijay on Leo, after their collaboration in Nanban and Beast. In 2026 he became the head of the M.G.R. Government Film and Television Training Institute.

== Filmography ==
Year	Film	Language	Notes
2008	Lungiman Takes a Ride	Tamil	Short film
2009	Eeram	Tamil	Vijay Award for Best Cinematographer; South Scope Cine Award for Best Cinematography
2010	Vinnaithaandi Varuvaayaa	Tamil	Cinema Award For Best Cinematographer
2010	Ye Maaya Chesave	Telugu	Filmfare Award for Best Cinematographer - Telugu
2010	Nayakan	Malayalam	
2010	Chutti Chathan	Tamil	Additional photography
2010	Nisabhdha Nilai	Tamil	Short film
2011	Nadunissi Naaygal	Tamil	
2011	Collector	Malayalam	
2012	Nanban	Tamil	Replaced Nirav Shah
2014	Poovarasam Peepee	Tamil	Also producer
2014	Race Gurram	Telugu	
2015	Kick 2	Telugu	
2015	Bruce Lee	Telugu	
2016	Jaguar	Kannada; Telugu	
2017	Villain	Malayalam	
2019	Enai Noki Paayum Thota	Tamil	
2019	Auto Shankar	Tamil	TV show; Also producer
2019	Sillu Karuppatti	Tamil	
2021	Kutty Story	Tamil	Segment: Edhirpaara Muththam
2021	Tughlaq Durbar	Tamil	
2021	Chithirai Sevvaanam	Tamil	
2022	Radhe Shyam	Telugu; Hindi	
2022	Beast	Tamil	Replaced Vijay Kartik Kannan; Also made a cameo appearance in the song Jolly O Gymkhana
2022	Prince	Tamil	
2023	Leo	Tamil	
2023	Dhruva Natchathiram	Tamil	Unreleased Film
2024	Guntur Kaaram	Telugu	Replaced P. S. Vinod more than 50% into the filming
2024	Minmini	Tamil	Also co-producer
2025	Hari Hara Veera Mallu	Telugu	
2025	They Call Him OG	Telugu	
2026	Idhayam Murali	Tamil	
