= Sila Nerangalil Sila Manidhargal (2022 film) =

2022 Indian film

- Theatrical release poster
- Directed by: Vishal Venkat
- Written by: Vishal Venkat; K. Manikandan
- Produced by: Ajmal Khan; Reyaa
- Starring: Ashok Selvan; Nassar; K. Manikandan
- Cinematography: Meyyendiran
- Edited by: Prasanna GK
- Music by: Radhan
- Production companies: AR Entertainment; Trident Arts
- Release date: 28 January 2022
- Country: India
- Language: Tamil

Sila Nerangalil Sila Manidhargal (transl. Some people at some moments) is a 2022 Indian Tamil-language hyperlink drama film written and directed by debutant Vishal Venkat and produced by AR Entertainment and Trident Arts. The film stars Ashok Selvan in lead role with Nassar, K. Manikandan, Abi Hassan, Anju Kurian , Reyya, K. S. Ravikumar, Riythvika and Sivamaran in supporting roles. The music is composed by Radhan, with cinematography handled by Meyyendiran and editing done by Prasanna GK. The film was released in theatres on 28 January 2022.

== Plot ==
Sila Nerangalil Sila Manidhargal begins by introducing four unrelated men—Vijay, a hot-headed youth; Pradheesh, an aspiring actor; Praveen, a wealthy and materialistic IT professional; and Rajasekhar, a humble hotel supervisor—each living very different lives shaped by their own values and struggles. The film first explores their personalities and everyday routines, making it clear that they belong to completely separate worlds. However, their lives suddenly intersect due to a tragic road accident, which becomes the central turning point of the story and connects all four characters in unexpected ways.

After the accident, the narrative focuses on how this single incident deeply affects each of them emotionally and psychologically. Vijay is forced to face the consequences of his uncontrollable anger, while Pradheesh struggles with guilt and public judgment. Praveen begins to realise that wealth cannot protect him from moral responsibility, and Rajasekhar, despite his innocence, suffers the emotional impact of the situation. Each character processes the event differently, dealing with regret, confusion, and inner conflict as they reflect on their actions and their role in what happened.

As the story progresses, all four men undergo gradual transformation. They begin to understand the importance of responsibility, empathy, and human connection, leading to personal growth. Instead of a dramatic or heroic ending, the film concludes on a realistic note, where each character accepts their mistakes and tries to move forward with a better understanding of life. The film ultimately conveys that while certain moments can change lives forever, people still have the ability to learn, change, and become better individuals.

== Cast ==
- Ashok Selvan as Vijaykumar
- Nassar as Selvaraaj
- K. Manikandan as Rajasekar
- Abi Hassan as Pradeesh
- Reyya as Malar
- K. S. Ravikumar as Arivazhagan
- Riythvika as Kayal
- Anju Kurian as Rithu
- Praveen Raja as Praveen
- Bhanupriya
- Ilavarasu as Varadha
- Anupama Kumar
- George Vijay Nelson
- Abhishek Kumar as Srivatsu
- Rishikanth as Murali
- Sivamaran

== Production ==
In July 2021, the title of Ashok Selvan's new project was announced by Kamal Haasan as Sila Nerangalil Sila Manidhargal. In December 2021, the children of writer Jayakanthan appealed to Haasan to avoid reusing the title of Jayakanthan's novel since the title was synonymous with their father's name. But still the title was unchanged. Filming began in January 2021 and was completed by that December.

== Soundtrack ==
The soundtrack is composed by Radhan. The audio rights were acquired by Sony Music India.

Track listing
No.	Title	Lyrics	Singer(s)	Length
1.	"Vizhi Pesum"	RJ Vijay	Chinmayi, Haricharan	05:11
2.	"Yaar Vazhiyil"	Snehan	Dhanush	05:07
3.	"Unakkaagave"	Maathevan	Sathya Prakash	05:21
4.	"Un Pirivu"	RJ Vijay	Sarath Santosh	02:24
5.	"Aatam"	Rakendu Mouli, MC Chetan	Andrea Jeremiah, MC Chetan	04:51
Total length:				22:54

== Release ==
=== Theatrical ===
Sila Nerangalil Sila Manidhargal was released in theatres on 28 January 2022.

=== Home media ===
The film began streaming on Aha from 25 February 2022.

== Reception ==
Logesh Balachandran of The Times of India who gave the film 3 out of 5 stars stated that "Regret can make all of us feel an implacable bitterness like no other emotions. When every character in the film goes through a similar emotion, we are forced to be a part of their journey and introspect our own tales. Sila Nerangalil Sila Manithargal is a heartwarming film with some takeaways for all generations." Avinash Ramachandran of Cinema Express rated the film 3.5 out of 5 stating that "This film is an example of the talent Tamil cinema has at its disposal; let’s hope then that they too get well-utilised before it is too late." Vishal Menon of Film Companion stated that despite its flaws and "generally flat making style, Sila Nerangalil Sila Manidhargal is a nicely-written drama about screwed-up people and how a singular event presents all four of them with a chance at redemption." Hindu Tamil Thisai lauded the cast performances, especially that of Nassar despite his limited screen time, but was mildly critical of the background music and felt some scenes were too long.
