= Habiba Al Marashi =

Habiba Al Marashi is an Emirati environmentalist. In 1991 she founded the Emirates Environmental Group, which she continues to chair. In 2004 she founded the Arabia CSR Network (ACSRN), devoted to corporate social responsibility across the Arab region. She has been referred to as 'the UAE environmental movement's most recognisable figure' and is widely praised for her environmental work, in encouraging public/private sector co-operation in recycling and environmentalism and sustainability. She sits on the board of the UN Global Compact (UN GC).

Al Marashi has long been an outspoken proponent of environmental best practices in the Emirates and has frequently lobbied for change in public forums and events.
