= Anya's Tutorial =

Psychological thriller directed by Pallavi Gangireddy

- Genre: Psychological thriller
- Written by: Sowmya Sharma
- Directed by: Pallavi Gangireddy
- Starring: Regina Cassandra; Nivedhithaa Sathish
- Music by: Arrol Corelli
- Country of origin: India
- Original language: Telugu

Production
- Producer: Shobu Yarlagadda
- Cinematography: Vijay K. Chakravathy
- Editor: Ravi Teja Girijala
- Production company: Arka Media Works

Original release
- Network: Aha
- Release: 1 July 2022

Anya’s Tutorial is a 2022 Indian Telugu-language psychological thriller directed by Pallavi Gangireddy in her directorial debut. It stars Regina Cassandra and Nivedhithaa Sathish in the lead roles. The series was produced by Shobhu Yarlagadda under the banner of Arka Media Works, with cinematography by Vijay K. Chakravathy and music by Arrol Corelli. The series was partially reshot and mostly dubbed in Tamil. It premiered on Aha on 1 July 2022.

== Cast ==
=== Main ===
- Regina Cassandra as Madhu
- Kamakshi Bhaskarla as Nikitha
- Nivedhithaa Sathish as Lavanya
- Prassadh
- Sameer Malla

=== Recurring ===
- Anuj Gurwara as Anuj
- Phalguni Naidu
- Sriteja Prassadh
- Lavanya Reddy

== Episodes ==
=== Season 1 (2023) ===
| No. | Title | Directed by | Written by | Original release date |
|---|---|---|---|---|
| 1 | "Deyyalu levu, Bhootalu levu" | Pallavi Gangireddy | Sowmya Sharma | 1 July 2022 |
| 2 | "#girlinahauntedhouse" | Pallavi Gangireddy | Sowmya Sharma | 1 July 2022 |
| 3 | "Sevam ela paaripotundi?" | Pallavi Gangireddy | Sowmya Sharma | 1 July 2022 |
| 4 | "Followers kosame na idantha?" | Pallavi Gangireddy | Sowmya Sharma | 1 July 2022 |
| 5 | "#findtheevilsister" | Pallavi Gangireddy | Sowmya Sharma | 1 July 2022 |
| 6 | "#justiceforanya" | Pallavi Gangireddy | Sowmya Sharma | 1 July 2022 |
| 7 | "It's too late" | Pallavi Gangireddy | Sowmya Sharma | 1 July 2022 |

== Reception ==
=== Critical response ===
Sangeetha Devi Dundoo of The Hindu in her review stated that "The series leaves questions unanswered, with ample scope for the story to be continued in Season Two. Not all of Anya’s Tutorial is convincing or absorbing, but as it progresses, it emerges as one of the better series in the Telugu digital space."

Paul Nicodemus of The Times of India rated the series 3.0/5 and wrote "The plot had enough to engage the audience with its layered past and present narration, but some might find it confusing and leaves room for ambiguity, unlike what’s written on Anya’s social media bio Things are simple; do not complicate them."

Ram Venkat Srikar of Cine Express gave the series 3 stars out of five and wrote "Anya’s Tutorial, as a horror show, posits some interesting ideas on the table and comes close to realising some of them. A tense atmosphere from start to finish, however, ensures that it holds our attention as the horror unravels before fizzling out towards the end."

A reviewer for ABP Live rated the series 2/5, stating "The cast, high production values and music are impressive. Even if the story disappoints...the making and taking are top class, so it engages to some extent."

Akanksha Senugupta of The Print in her review stated "Despite a stellar cast and convincing performances by Nivedithaa Satish and Regina Cassandra, the storyline simply ruptures."

== Release ==
Along with the original version in Telugu, the series is also available in Hindi dubbed version titled as 'Anyaa' streaming on Ultra Play & in Marathi language titled as 'Lavanya' streaming on Ultra Jhakaas app respectively.
