= Zirku Airport =

- IATA: none; ICAO: OMAZ

Summary
- Airport type: Private
- Operator: Zakum Development Company
- Location: Zirku Island, UAE
- Time zone: UAE Standard Time (UTC+04:00)
- Elevation AMSL: 14 ft / 4 m
- Coordinates: 24°51′48″N 053°04′33″E

Map
- Location in the UAE OMAZ (Persian Gulf) OMAZ (Indian Ocean) OMAZ (Middle East) OMAZ (West and Central Asia) OMAZ (Asia)

Runways
Direction	Length		Surface
Direction	m	ft	Surface
13/31	1,200	3,937	Gravel
- Sources: UAE AIP

Zirku Airport (ICAO: OMAZ) is a private airfield operated by the Zakum Development Company. It serves the oil field at Zirku Island, Abu Dhabi, UAE.
