= Narai Ezhuthum Suyasaritham =

2016 Indian Tamil-language drama film directed by K. Manikandan

- Directed by: K. Manikandan
- Written by: K. Manikandan
- Produced by: Shashank Vennelakanti
- Starring: Delhi Ganesh; K. Manikandan
- Cinematography: R. Vasantha Kumar
- Edited by: Rajesh Ramakrishnan
- Release dates: 2016 (film festivals); January 2022 (Sony Liv)
- Running time: 82 minutes
- Country: India
- Language: Tamil

Narai Ezhuthum Suyasaritham (transl. Endless) is a 2016 Indian Tamil-language drama film written and directed by K. Manikandan on his directorial debut, while also starring himself in the main lead role alongside Delhi Ganesh. The film revolves around the story of a deep friendship between a pensioner who has been battling loneliness after his retirement and an unemployed young man who has been finding difficulties to put food on the table. The film had its world premiere at international film festivals in 2016. Sony Liv bought the digital streaming rights of the film and the film was streamed via Sony Liv in January 2022.

== Plot ==
Narai Ezhuthum Suyasaritham follows Vaidhyanathan(Delhi Ganesh), an aging senior employee of a private export company, who has built his entire identity around his job, authority, discipline, and position within his family. Although he is still about a year away from his official retirement, the company decides to force him into early retirement because he has failed to keep up with the rapidly changing workplace and new technology. The arrival of computers and younger, more technologically capable employees makes him feel that he has become outdated and unwanted.

Vaidhyanathan is a strict and authoritarian man at home as well. He expects his wife and two sons to follow his rules and frequently criticizes them for their habits. His elder son is working and is concerned about expanding the family home and managing a bank loan, while his younger son is still studying and is constantly reprimanded by his father for being careless and disorganized. Even his wife tends to remain submissive because of Vaidhyanathan's domineering personality. His granddaughter, however, gradually becomes an important source of affection in his life.

The forced retirement deeply affects Vaidhyanathan. While his family initially sees his retirement as something positive, he experiences it as a humiliating loss of status and purpose. At work, he was someone whose instructions mattered; suddenly, he has nowhere to go and little authority. Even ordinary things at home begin to feel different. The respect and importance he once received slowly disappear, making him increasingly frustrated and isolated. The film uses the contrast between his former working life and his retirement to show how strongly his identity has been tied to employment.

At the same time, the story introduces (K. Manikandan), a young unemployed man struggling to survive in Chennai. Unlike Vaidhyanathan, who has lost a job after years of employment, Manikandan desperately wants a job but cannot find one. He goes from company to company attending interviews and searching for opportunities, often returning empty-handed. His poverty is so severe that even a cup of tea becomes significant. The tea-shop owner treats him with suspicion and contempt when he cannot pay, emphasizing the social humiliation experienced by an unemployed young person.

The two men's lives unexpectedly intersect when Vaidhyanathan, frustrated and emotionally disturbed after losing his job, drinks alcohol and rides his scooter. He ends up hitting Manikandan. What initially appears to be an unfortunate accident becomes the beginning of an unusual relationship. An older man who feels that society has made him irrelevant meets a young man who is struggling to find his place in society. Their circumstances are different, but both are experiencing the same underlying feeling: they are no longer being valued by the people around them.

Their relationship gradually develops into a genuine friendship. Manikandan's youthful outlook begins to influence Vaidhyanathan. The older man slowly discovers that life does not have to revolve entirely around his former job, position, or authority. Through his friendship with the young man, he begins to rediscover simple pleasures and becomes more relaxed and open-minded.

This transformation is reflected particularly in his relationship with his family. The man who previously spent much of his time shouting at his wife and sons begins behaving differently. He becomes more playful with his granddaughter and starts enjoying himself in ways that his family has rarely seen before. At one point, the song "Oda Oda Oda Thooram Koraiala" becomes part of this transformation: a song he had previously objected to becomes something he himself enjoys, even singing and dancing along to it.

Manikandan, meanwhile, also begins to regain hope. Vaidhyanathan becomes something of a mentor and friend to him. He encourages the young man not to give up on finding employment and even connects his prospects for love with his ability to establish himself in life. Manikandan has feelings for a young woman, but his lack of employment and financial stability makes his future uncertain. Eventually, his persistence begins to pay off, giving him a chance to move forward with his life.

However, Vaidhyanathan's transformation is not immediately accepted by his family. The family has become accustomed to seeing him as the strict, controlling father and husband. When he suddenly starts behaving differently—becoming cheerful, spontaneous and less authoritarian—they struggle to understand him. His children interpret his unusual behavior negatively and eventually begin to think that something is wrong with him. The irony is that when Vaidhyanathan finally changes for the better, the people closest to him are unable to recognize that change.

The conflict reaches its emotional peak when Vaidhyanathan's family labels him as mentally unstable. The man who spent his entire life believing that he knew how everyone should behave is now treated as though he has lost his mind simply because he has begun living differently. This becomes the final emotional crisis of the story.

The film concludes with Vaidhyanathan making an important decision after being rejected and misunderstood by his own family. Rather than returning to his old authoritarian personality, he chooses to move forward with the new perspective he has gained through his friendship with Manikandan. The ending emphasizes that retirement does not have to mean the end of a person's usefulness or identity. Instead, it can become the beginning of another stage of life.

== Cast ==
- Delhi Ganesh as Vaidyanathan
- K. Manikandan as Manikandan
- Mirchi Vijay
- Aadhavan
- RJ Shivshankari
- Rakendu Mouli
- Praveen Raja
- Shobana

== Production ==
K. Manikandan announced his maiden directorial venture with the intention to make an independent art film, exclusively appealing for the audiences at international film festivals. He had apparently decided to go ahead with the principal photography, based on his script, without aiming for a theatrical release, and he insisted that he did not want to include commercial elements for his film, which would otherwise deviate from his thought process.

The principal photography of the film commenced in 2012 as a low budgeted film with INR ₹2 lakh and the production of the film was wrapped up in 2015. Shashank Vennelakanti produced the film under his production banner G&K Vahinee Productions. R. Vasantha Kumar cranked the cinematography of the film while the editing was handled by Rajesh Ramakrishnan.

== Reception ==
Despite the film responding with positive feedback from critics, director Manikandan himself felt unhappy about the final output of the film, calling it his amateurish work and admitting there were flaws in his filmmaking.

== Premiere ==
The film was officially selected to be screened at the 2016 Bengaluru International Film Festival under the Indian Cinema Competition. It was also chosen for screening at 16th edition of the New York Indian Film Festival in 2016.
