= Indha Nilai Maarum =

2020 film

- Film poster
- Directed by: Arunkanth V
- Written by: Arunkanth V
- Produced by: Siva; Viji
- Starring: Ashwin Kumar; Ramkumar; Nivedhithaa Sathish
- Cinematography: Sukumaran Sundar
- Edited by: Arunkanth V
- Music by: Allen Sebastian; Arunkanth V
- Production company: Panthalam Cinemas Private Limited
- Distributed by: InfoPluto Media Works
- Release date: 6 March 2020
- Running time: 100 minutes
- Country: India
- Language: Tamil

Indha Nilai Maarum (transl. This situation will change) is a 2020 Tamil-language thriller film directed by Arunkanth V. The film features Ashwin Kumar, Ramkumar and Nivedhithaa Sathish in the lead roles. The film was released on 6 March 2020.

== Cast ==
- Ashwin Kumar as Surya
- Ramkumar as Deva
- Nivedhithaa Sathish as Deva's friend
- Chaams as Radio Jackson, who dresses like Michael Jackson
- T. M. Karthik as the general manager of a publishing company
- Y. G. Mahendra as Lawyer Adhithyan
- Lakshmy Ramakrishnan as Deva's mother
- Delhi Ganesh as Justice Narayanan
- Santhana Bharathi as Minister
- Pandu as Police Inspector
- Deena Angamuthu as Cyclone Star
- Kalangal Dinesh as Deva's friend
- Sarah George as Junior Lawyer
- Vinod Varma as Marketing Manager

== Production ==
The film began production in 2017 with Ramkumar, Ashwin Kumar Lakshmikanthan, and Nivedhithaa Sathish in the lead roles. Y. G. Mahendra was reported to be playing the villain with Lakshmy Ramakrishnan as his female aid. The film is set in an IT company.

== Soundtrack ==
Songs for the film were composed by Arunkanth V.

- Indha Nilai Maarum - Suchith Suresan, Trilok MC
- Kadhal Thevai - Suchith Suresan, Trilok MC
- Hey Sweety - Suchith Suresan, Vaishali
- Aint Going Down - Trilok MC
- Tribute To Tamanna - Roshan Sebastian

== Release ==
The film premiered on 6 March 2020.

Indha Nilai Maarum received negative reviews. The Times of India gave the film one out of five stars and stated that "The film is unappealing in every ways, and the terrible part is, the sequences appear like a poorly staged drama." Film Companion wrote "Like his first film Goko Mako, Indha Nilai Maarum too exists in a peculiar space where it keeps achieving bursts of “so-bad-its-so-good” glory, but even the awfulness is inconsistent." Maalaimalar praised the intent of the film. Dina Thanthi praised the direction, cinematography, and background music.
