= Mario (2025 film) =

2025 Indian Telugu film by Kalyanji Gogana

- Theatrical release poster
- Directed by: Kalyanji Gogana
- Written by: Kalyanji Gogana
- Produced by: Prakya Anirudh Sreevatsav
- Starring: Hebah Patel; Prakya Anirudh Sreevatsav; Rakendu Mouli
- Cinematography: M. N. Balreddy
- Edited by: Manikanth
- Music by: Score; M. S. Jones Rupert; Songs: Rakendu Mouli; Sai Karthik
- Production companies: Silver Screen Productions; Kalyanji Content Pictures; Rizwan Entertainment
- Release date: 19 December 2025
- Country: India
- Language: Telugu

Mario is a 2025 Indian Telugu-language crime comedy film written and directed by Kalyanji Gogana. The film stars Hebah Patel, Prakya Anirudh Sreevatsav and Rakendu Mouli. The film was released on 19 December 2025.

== Cast ==
- Hebah Patel as Hebah
- Prakya Anirudh Sreevatsav as Anirudh
- Rakendu Mouli as Bob Marley
- Yashna Muthuluri as Smrithi
- Madee Manepalli
- Kalpika Ganesh as Zora
- Mourya Siddavaram as Gas Murthy

== Music ==
The background score is composed by M. S. Jones Rupert while the songs were composed by Sai Karthik and Rakendu Mouli.

All lyrics are written by Rakendu Mouli.

Track listing
No.	Title	Music	Singer(s)	Length
1.	"Haayi Haayigaa"	Rakendu Mouli	S. P. Charan, Vinaita Sivakumar	3:19
2.	"Cute Cute Hebah"	Sai Karthik	Rakendu Mouli	4:03
3.	"Sampradayini"	Rakendu Mouli	Rakendu Mouli

== Release and reception ==
Mario was released on 19 December 2025.

Suhas Sistu of The Hans India rated it 3 out of 5. Avad Mohammad of OTTPlay too gave the same rating and noted the performances of Hebah Patel and Rakendu Mouli.
