= Rakendu Mouli =

Indian Telugu actor, lyricist, and singer

- Born: Rakendu Mouli Vennelakanti; India
- Occupations: Lyricist; actor; singer; dialogue writer
- Years active: 1996; 2012–present
- Spouse: Silpa Vennelakanti
- Father: Vennelakanti

Rakendu Mouli Vennelakanti is an Indian lyricist, singer, dialogue writer and actor who works in Telugu cinema. He is the son of Telugu lyricist Vennelakanti.

== Career ==
Mouli worked as assistant director for Yeto Vellipoyindhi Manasu and Janda Pai Kapiraju. He made his debut as an actor with Moodu Mukkallo Cheppalante (2015) in which he played the lead role. In 2016, he played Naga Chaitanya's friend in Sahasam Swasaga Sagipo. He played supporting roles in Kirrak Party, a Telugu remake of the Kannada film Kirik Party, and played one of the lead roles in My Dear Marthandam (2018). In 2019, he made his Tamil debut with Enai Noki Paayum Thota, where he played Dhanush's friend.

He made his Telugu debut as a lyricist with Andala Rakshasi (2012) and garnered acclaim for the song "Manasu Palike". He wrote the lyrics for four of the five songs in Meeku Maathrame Cheptha (2019).

== Personal life ==
Mouli's father, Vennelakanti, was a lyricist and his brother Shashank Vennelakanti is a dialogue writer.

== Filmography ==
=== Film ===
- All films are in Telugu, unless otherwise noted.

List of Rakendu Mouli film acting credits
| Year | Title | Role | Notes |
|---|---|---|---|
| 2015 | Janda Pai Kapiraju | | Debut Film |
| 2015 | Moodu Mukkallo Cheppalante | Arjun | Debut as Lead Actor |
| 2016 | Sahasam Swasaga Sagipo | Mahesh | |
| 2018 | Kirrak Party | Arjun | |
| 2018 | My Dear Marthandam | Surya | |
| 2019 | Enai Noki Paayum Thota | Vasanth | Tamil film |
| 2020 | Anukunnadi Okati Ayinadi Okati | Rakendu Mouli | Cameo Appearance |
| 2021 | Super Over | Vasu | Aha Film |
| 2021 | Sundari | Ritesh | |
| 2021 | Senapathi | Hussain | Aha Film |
| 2022 | Narai Ezhuthum Suyasaritham | A company employee | Tamil film; Released on Sony Liv |
| 2023 | Kranthi | Ram | Aha film |
| 2023 | Maa Oori Polimera 2 | S I Ravindra Naik | |
| 2025 | Mario | Bob Marley | |
| 2026 | Sub-Inspector Yugandar | Guna Sundaram | |

=== As lyricist ===
- All films are in Telugu, unless otherwise noted.

List of Rakendu Mouli lyricist credits
| Year | Film | Songs(s) | Notes |
|---|---|---|---|
| 2012 | Andala Rakshasi | "Yemito", "Manasu Palike" | |
| 2015 | Moodu Mukkallo Cheppalante | "Bewarse to Business Mode", "Thoduga Ne Needaga" | Also actor |
| 2015 | Paayum Puli | "Naa Soodana Mogini" | Tamil song |
| 2016 | Sahasam Swasaga Sagipo | "Shokilla" | Also actor |
| 2018 | Rangula Ratnam | "Yemaindhi" | |
| 2018 | Kirrak Party | "Guruvaram", "Sir Bewarse", "Neechamaina", "Meera's - Theme" | Also actor |
| 2019 | Rakshasudu | "Cheekattlo Kamme", "Kallaloo Merupu" | |
| 2019 | Meeku Maathrame Cheptha | "La la la" | |
| 2019 | Raja Vaaru Rani Gaaru | "Pain Song" | |
| 2019 | Mathu Vadalara | "Saalaa Rey Saalaa" | |
| 2022 | Sila Nerangalil Sila Manidhargal | "Aatam" | Tamil film |
| 2022 | Tees Maar Khan | "Samayanike", "Tees Maar Khan Theme Song" | |
| 2024 | Alanaati Ramchandrudu | "Brahmhaandamantha" | |
| 2024 | Rewind | "Love At First Sight" | |
| 2024 | Appudo Ippudo Eppudo | "Neetho Ila" | |
| 2025 | Akkada Ammayi Ikkada Abbayi | "Priyamara" | |
| 2025 | Mario | "Haayi Haayigaa", "Sampradayini" | Also composer |
| 2026 | Gandhi Talks | "Saddha Saddha", "Gandhi Rap" | |

Dubbed films

| Year | Film | Notes |
|---|---|---|
| 2013 | Chirunavvula Chirujallu | |
| 2015 | Rakshasudu | |
| 2015 | Nava Manmadhudu | |
| 2016 | Kotikokkadu | |
| 2016 | Kaashmora | |
| 2017 | Yamudu 3 | |
| 2017 | Gajendrudu | |
| 2017 | Marakathamani | |
| 2018 | Gang | |
| 2018 | Nawab | |
| 2018 | Sarkar | |
| 2019 | Sarvam Thaala Mayam | |
| 2019 | Whistle | |
| 2019 | Vijay Sethupathi | |
| 2020 | Aakaasam Nee Haddhu Ra | Also dialogue writer |
| 2022 | Gargi | |
| 2022 | Cobra | |
| 2023 | Regina | |
| 2023 | Nayakudu | |
| 2024 | Kanguva | |
| 2025 | 3BHK | |
| 2026 | Annagaru Vostaru | |

=== Television ===
List of Rakendu Mouli television acting credits
| Year | Title | Role | Network | Language | Notes |
|---|---|---|---|---|---|
| 2016 | Ctrl Alt Del | Gowtham | YouTube | Tamil | |
| 2018 | Pelli Gola 2 | Gurram Gangadhar | Viu | Telugu | Cameo appearance |
| 2018 | Ee Office Lo | Hari Kiran | Viu | Telugu | |
| 2019 | What's up Panimanishi | Natraj 'Natti/Nats' | ZEE5 | Telugu | Also dialogues for Telugu version |
| 2019 | What's up Velakkari | Natraj 'Natti/Nats' | ZEE5 | Tamil | Also dialogues for Telugu version |
| 2019 | Virgin @ 27 | Srinu | Watcho | Telugu | |
| 2020 | Ee Office Lo 2 | Hari Kiran | Viu | Telugu | Cameo appearance |
| 2024 | Brinda | Young Satya | SonyLIV | Telugu | |
| 2025 | Constable Kanakam | Dr. Hanumantha Rao | ETV Win | Telugu | |

=== Short films ===
- All Short films are in Telugu, unless otherwise noted.

List of Rakendu Mouli film acting credits
| Year | Title | Role | Network | Notes | Ref |
|---|---|---|---|---|---|
| 2014 | Aa Pilla Perenti? | Sandy | YouTube | Also lyrics | |
| 2020 | Aarambam | Vidyadhar | YouTube | | |

=== Dialogue writer ===
- As I'm Suffering from Prema (2017) (webseries); Telugu dubbed version
- What's up Panimanishi (2019) (webseries)
- Khaidi (2019); Telugu dubbed version
- Aakaasam Nee Haddhu Ra (2020); Telugu dubbed version
- Sulthan (2021); Telugu dubbed version
- Senapathi (2021)
- MenToo (2023)
- Animal (2023); Telugu dubbed version
- Mahavatar Narsimha (2025); Telugu dubbed version (co-writer)
- Coolie (2025); Telugu dubbed version

== Discography ==
Film songs

- All films are in Telugu, unless otherwise noted.
- (D) indicates dubbed version.

List of Rakendu Mouli film singing credits
| Year | Film | Song(s) | Notes |
|---|---|---|---|
| 1996 | Topi Raja Sweety Roja | "Naa Pere Sweety Roja" | |
| 2012 | Andala Rakshasi | "Manasu Palike" | |
| 2013 | Biriyani (D) | "Biriyani (Rap)", "Adugule Na Ningi" | |
| 2015 | Moodu Mukkallo Cheppalante | "Newse Mose", "Bewarse to Business Mode" | Also actor |
| 2015 | Rakshasudu (D) | "Boochi Boochai" | |
| 2016 | Sahasam Swasaga Sagipo | "Shokila" | Also actor |
| 2017 | Gajendrudu (D) | "Kondaa Konallo" | |
| 2019 | Thoota (D) | "Freak Out" | Also actor |
| 2025 | Mario | "Cute Cute Hebah", "Sampradayini" | Also composer |
| 2026 | Annagaru Vostaru (D) | "Annagaru", "Alaapikkey Ummak" | |

Independent songs

- Marvel Anthem (2019): Telugu version lyrics
- Nene Lekunte (2020)
- Rowdy Pattasu (2021): Telugu Version lyrics

== Awards and nominations ==
List of Rakendu Mouli awards and nominations
| Year | Award | Category | Work | Result | Ref. |
|---|---|---|---|---|---|
| 2012 | Mirchi Music Awards South | Best Upcoming Lyricist – Telugu | "Manasu Palike" from Andala Rakshasi | Won | |
