= Sir Abu Nu'ayr =

Island in Sharjah, United Arab Emirates

Native name: صِيْر أَبُو نُعَيْر Nickname: Sir Bu Nuʽayr (صِيْر بُو نُعَيْر) Sir Al Qawasim (صِيْر ٱلْقَوَاسِم)
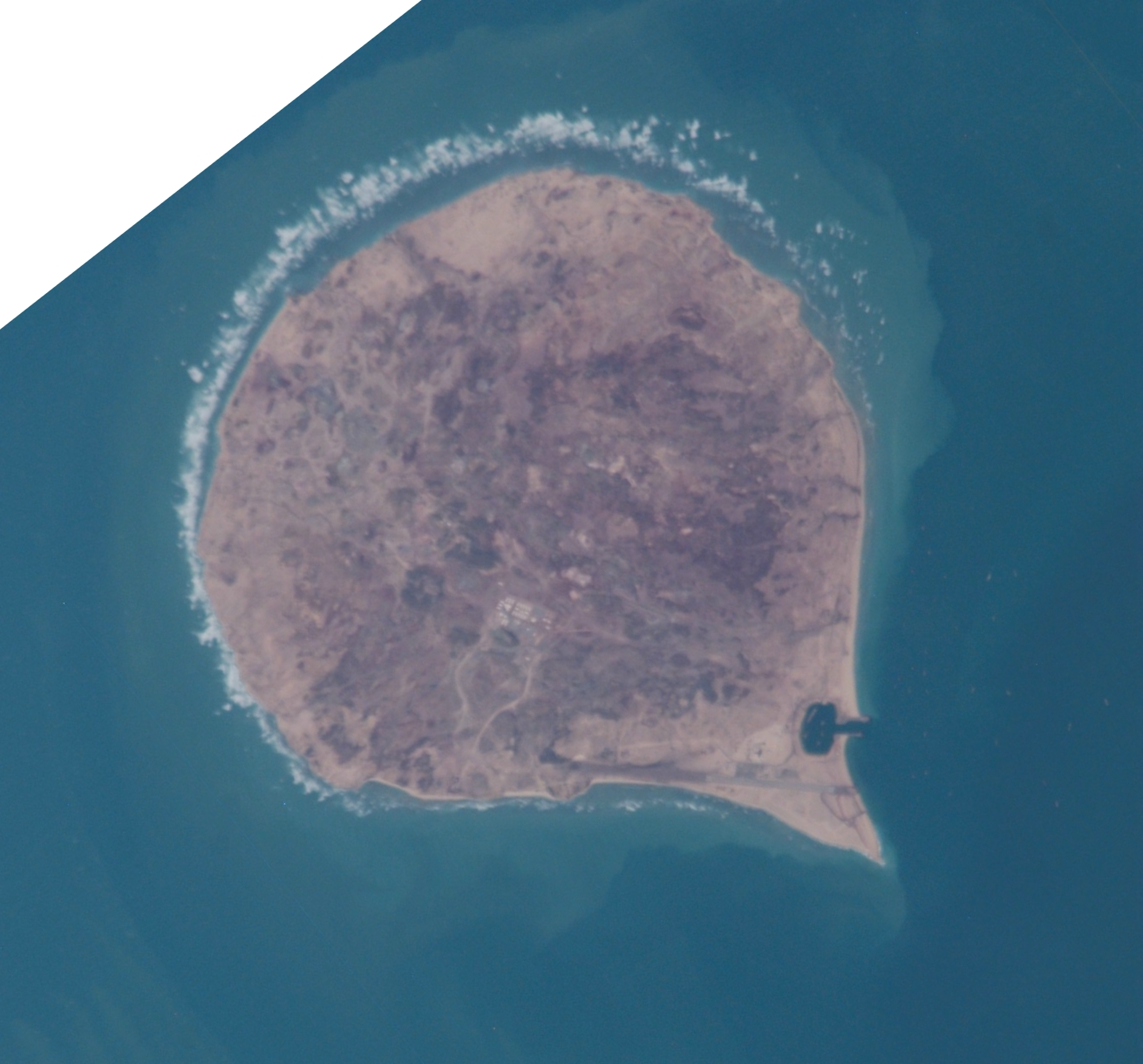
- ISS image

- Location within United Arab Emirates

Geography
- Location: Persian Gulf
- Coordinates: 25°13′54″N 54°13′20″E
- Total islands: 1
- Area: 13.23 km^{2} (5.11 sq mi)
- Length: 4.25 km (2.641 mi)
- Width: 4 km (2.5 mi)
- Highest elevation: 81 m (266 ft)

Administration
- United Arab Emirates
- Emirate: Sharjah

Ramsar Wetland
- Official name: Sir Bu Nair Island Protected Area
- Designated: 2 December 2013
- Reference no.: 2191

Sir Abu Nuʽayr (Arabic: صِيْر أَبُو نُعَيْر, romanized: Ṣīr Abū Nuʽayr), also known as Sir Bu Nuʽayr (Arabic: صِيْر بُو نُعَيْر, romanized: Ṣīr Bū Nuʿayr), or Sir al Qawasim (Arabic: صِيْر ٱلْقَوَاسِم, romanized: Ṣīr Al-Qawāsim; also romanized as Sir Abu Neir, Sir Bu Nair or Sir Bu Nuair) is an island in the Persian Gulf.

== History ==
The island was historically a base for pearl divers and fishermen, and its single freshwater well provided an important source of water for seafarers. It takes its name from a sheikh of the ruling Al Qasimi family of Sharjah. The Emirate of Sharjah declared Sir Bu Nair a protected nature reserve in 2000.

== Geography ==
Lying 65 kilometres (40 mi) off the coast of the Emirate of Abu Dhabi, roughly 80 kilometres (50 mi) north of Abu Dhabi city, and 103 kilometres (64 mi) west of Dubai, it belongs to the Emirate of Sharjah, United Arab Emirates.

=== Geology ===
The island is almost perfectly round with a diameter of 4 kilometres (2.5 miles), and a 1 kilometre (0.62 miles) long extension at its southeast end, giving the island the shape of a teardrop.

The island is a salt-piercement structure formed by the movement of late Neoproterozoic to Early Cambrian Hormuz Formation salt. The salt has moved progressively upward, puncturing through the younger overlying strata to create a salt dome structure. Surface expressions are composed of evaporite rocks, plus igneous rocks and quartzitic sandstone.

=== Environment ===
The island, an environmentally protected area under the Sharjah Environment and Protected Areas Authority (EPAA), has been registered on the list of wetlands of international importance under the Ramsar Convention, and was in 2012 listed as a potential UNESCO World Heritage Site. The island has been designated an Important Bird Area (IBA) by BirdLife International because it supports populations of Socotra cormorants, sooty gulls and bridled terns.

=== Economy ===
Sharjah has a small harbour and an airfield (ICAO: OMSN), both located at the island's southeast end.

Crescent Petroleum is the concession holder of the area. The acreage is flanked to the north-northeast by Dubai's Fateh Oil Field complex, to the north by the Sirri Island oil field of Iran, and to the west by the prolific oil and gas fields of Abu Dhabi.

== Ecology and conservation ==
Sir Bu Nair is one of the most important hawksbill turtle nesting sites in the Persian Gulf and the most important in the United Arab Emirates, with turtles nesting on its beaches between March and June. The surrounding waters support more than 70 species of reef fish and around 40 species of coral, and the reserve has been included on the IUCN Green List of Protected and Conserved Areas in recognition of its management.

== See also ==
- Zirku Island
- Al Marmoom Desert Conservation Reserve, Dubai
- Al-Wathba Wetland Reserve, Abu Dhabi
- Dubai Desert Conservation Reserve
- Jebel Hafeet National Park, Abu Dhabi
- Mangrove National Park, Abu Dhabi
- Ras Al Khor, Dubai
- Sir Bani Yas, Abu Dhabi
- Wadi Wurayah, Fujairah
- Wildlife of the United Arab Emirates
