= Saih Al Salam =

Village in Dubai, United Arab Emirates

Coordinates: 24.865°N 55.383°E

Saih Al Salam is a village in Dubai, United Arab Emirates (UAE), which also lends its name to the surrounding area, in which are to be found the Al Marmoom Desert Conservation Reserve, the Al Qudra Lakes and the Mohammed bin Rashid Al Maktoum Solar Park. The Bab Al Shams Desert Hotel is also located here.

With a 2015 population of 820, the village was linked to the Dubai/Al Ain highway (E66) by a new road system opened in May 2018.
