= Minmini (2024 film) =

Indian Tamil language drama film

- Theatrical release poster
- Directed by: Halitha Shameem
- Written by: Halitha Shameem
- Produced by: Manoj Paramahamsa; R. Murali Krishnan
- Starring: C. Gaurav Kaalai; Praveen Kishore; Esther Anil
- Cinematography: Manoj Paramahamsa
- Edited by: Raymond Derrick Crasta
- Music by: Khatija Rahman
- Distributed by: Tentkotta; Simbaaaa Productions
- Release date: 9 August 2024
- Country: India
- Language: Tamil

Minmini (transl. Firefly) is a 2024 Indian Tamil-language coming-of-age drama film written and directed by Halitha Shameem. The film stars C. Gaurav Kaalai, Praveen Kishore, and Esther Anil in the lead roles.

The film was released on 9 August 2024 in theatres.

== Plot ==
In 2016, at Streaks Matriculation School, in Ooty, Pari Mukilan "Pari", a charismatic student and accomplished football player, shared his high school classroom with newcomer Sabari Karthikeyan "Sabari", a studious and talented artist and chess enthusiast. While Pari dreamed of exploring the Himalayas on his bike, Sabari aspired to showcase his art in prestigious museums like the Louvre and Acropolis. Initially, Pari mocked and bullied Sabari, but they eventually developed a deeper understanding of each other.

During a school trip to a nearby tribal village, their bus met with an accident. Sabari, still recovering from illness and struggling with asthma, was trapped. Pari courageously rescued him but succumbed to his injuries, leaving him brain-dead. The school mourned Pari's tragic loss. Overcoming this with remorse, Sabari regretted not expressing gratitude for Pari's lifesaving act. Pari's donated organs, including his heart, gave new life to five individuals, one among them is Praveenah. Inspired by Pari's selflessness and as an act of gratitude, Praveenah voluntarily transfers to his school, where she observes Sabari's fixation on Pari's belongings and interests. Recognizing Sabari's attempt to honor Pari's memory, Praveenah watched as he abandoned chess for showjumping, a passion Pari had. Following a disappointing loss in the showjumping competition, Sabari's disappearance left Praveenah worried.

Seven years later, Sabari is spotted riding solo through the Himalayas. Praveenah, working on the "Bring Back the Beasts and Butterflies" initiative, joins him as a co-rider, concealing her identity. Unaware of their shared past, Sabari is distant, eventually leaving her without notice. Praveenah narrowly escapes a molestation attempt during an overnight stay and flees with the help of a truck driver. Meanwhile, Sabari encounters the biking group and, upon learning of Praveenah's ordeal, confronts and beats the perpetrator before embarking on a search for her. Upon finding Praveenah among tribal women, Sabari offers to accompany her until she leaves for Sikkim. As they travel, Praveenah attempts to rekindle Sabari's passions and encourage him to live his own life, free from remorse over Pari's death. During their journey, they meet Sid, who shares his grief and affirms that nature alone can heal such wounds.

At the Key Temple, Praveenah witnesses Sabari's emotional breakdown, and later, at an art café, encourages him to paint. Sabari reveals he always feels Pari's presence and creates a poignant portrait of a young boy they met in Ladakh. After a camel ride, Sindhu whisks Sabari away to spot a snow leopard, leaving Praveenah alone overnight. The next morning, Praveenah notices a subtle transformation in Sabari; he has become more sociable. As they ride past Khardung La, Sabari unexpectedly encounters his former P.T. master, Thilak, now serving in the defense forces. Thilak recognizes Praveenah, sparking Sabari's curiosity. He begins to piece together Praveenah's enigmatic behavior and cryptic comments, which eerily echo his past experiences.

Sabari confronts Praveenah, demanding to know her true identity. Praveenah reveals a profound connection: she is the recipient of the deceased Pari's heart, transplanted to her after the surgery.

== Cast ==
- Gaurav Kaalai. C as Pari Mukilan
- Praveen Kishore as Sabari Karthikeyan
- Esther Anil as Praveenah
- Aishwaryaa Ravi as Praveenah's mother
- Abhishek Krishnan as Praveenah's father
- Malini Jeevarathnam as Malini
- Shah Ra as a warden
- Muthamizh Kalai Vizhi as a teacher
- Raichal Rabecca as a teacher
- Thilak Rammohan as a P.T. Master
- Santhosh Prathap as Sid (Cameo appearance)
- Abhinaya Melusub as Samyuktha
- Nivedhithaa Sathish as Sindhu (Cameo appearance)

== Production ==
The film began production in 2015. The makers decided to wait for the child actors to grow up and play their parts as young adults and resumed the shoot in 2022. Khatija Rahman made her debut in this film as a music composer.

== Music ==
The film's music was composed by Khatija Rahman.

All lyrics are written by Halitha Shameem.

Track listing
No.	Title	Singer(s)	Length
1.	"Iru Perum Nadhigal"	Shakthisree Gopalan	3:17
2.	"Minmini Nee"	Sarthak Kalyani; Sireesha Bhagavatula	3:33
3.	"Uyirai"	Suryansh	2:18
4.	"Jananam"	Khatija Rahman; Sireesha Bhagavatula	3:05
Total length:			12:13

== Release ==
=== Theatrical ===
The film was released on 9 August 2024 in theatres.

=== Home media ===
Minmini began streaming on ZEE5 from 30 May 2025.

== Reception ==
Roopa Radhakrishnan of The Times of India rated it 3.5/5 and stated that "Esther Anil, Pravin Kishore and Gaurav Kalai make us care for their characters. The former two actors' fun banter is amplified by the natural chemistry that they share with each other." Prashanth Vallavan of The New Indian Express wrote "Minimini is still a refreshing departure from the onslaught of hyper-violent films in recent times."

Latha Srinivasan of the Hindustan Times wrote "Minmini paints a very pretty picture but doesn’t hit the right spot as some of her other films did." Janani K of India Today gave 2/5 stars and wrote "'Minmini' is director Halitha Shameem's weakest script yet. However, it is saved by the performances and technical finesse."
