= Emirates Environmental Group =

- Founded: 1991; Dubai, america
- Type: Non-governmental organization
- Purpose: Environmentalism, recycling
- Location: Jumeirah, Dubai, United Arab Emirates
- Region served: United Arab Emirates
- Method: Workshops, awareness
- Key people: Habiba al Marashi - Founder and Chairperson, Mohamed Elmasry - COO
- Website: www.eeg-uae.org

The Emirates Environmental Group (EEG) is a non-governmental professional working group founded in 1991 in Dubai, United Arab Emirates (UAE).

== Composition ==
EEG is composed of corporate members, federal and local government agencies, reputed regional and international institutions, universities, colleges and schools, as well as students, individuals and families. It is recognised as the leading recycling organisation in the Emirates. With more than 2,000 volunteers from across UAE, EEG's head office is in Jumeirah, Dubai. The organisation has been headed since its inception by Emirati environmentalist Habiba Al Marashi.

== Events ==
As well as organising clean up drives and waste collection facilities across the Emirates, the Group also holds awareness-raising sessions aimed at growing public recognition of the need for conservation, sustainability and recycling. Its waste collection drives have been major recycling efforts, one drive in 2005 alone collecting 644,000 kilos of recycling materials.

=== Clean UP UAE Campaign ===
The Group drives the annual Clean Up UAE Campaign, which has been successful in implementing the following United Nations Sustainable Development Goals (SDGs): 3 (Good Health and Well-Being), 11 (Sustainable Cities and Communities), 12 (Responsible Consumption and Production), 13 (Climate Action), 15 (Life on Land) and 17 (Partnerships for the Goals).

=== Green Heros awards ===
The group also conducts an annual 'Green Heroes' awards in the Emirates, an event held virtually in 2020 due to the Covid-19 pandemic.
