= Pink Caravan =

Non-profit Organization

Pink Caravan is a United Arab Emirates-based initiative to raise awareness of the importance of screening for breast cancer and to provide facilities for the early detection of, treatment for and recovery from the condition.

It was launched in 2011 under the patronage of the Ruler of Sharjah Dr Sultan bin Mohammed Al Qasimi and his wife, Jawaher Bint Mohammed Al Qasimi. A passionate proponent of screening and awareness, Jawaher is a founder and patron of the Friends of Cancer Patients Society (FoCP) and an international Ambassador for the Union for International Cancer Control (UICC).

== Annual ride ==
Pink Caravan organises an annual Pink Caravan Ride, taking a route through all seven emirates, with a particular focus on reaching remote areas. The Pink Caravan Ride to date has travelled over 1,440 km across the UAE, with over 400 riders, 650 volunteers and 455 medical clinics offering early breast cancer detection examinations for 48,874 people, including 8,526 men. The Pink Caravan Ride has also visited 84 schools, delivering educational sessions and lectures about the importance of early detection of breast cancer.

In 2017, the ride provided 7,483 early screenings, resulting in ten positive screening results. It has been cited as the inspiration for launching Germany's Pink Caravan Ride.

The eighth annual ride, in February and March 2018, was the first to be accompanied by the new Dhs 15 million mobile mammography unit, purchased with funds raised by Pink Caravan in association with UAE Charity, Friends of Cancer Patients (FoCP). The mobile unit will now operate a year-round screening service. The 2018 ride was the most extensive campaign ever, with 230 horse riders, including 150 locals, 65 from Arab world and 15 from Europe. Some 100 volunteers and over 200 medical practitioners worked on the campaign, with 30 fixed clinics set up across the country.

== Sharjah Breast Care Centre ==
The Sharjah Breast Care Centre (SBCC) was inaugurated in 2016, founded through a partnership between Pink Caravan, the University Hospital Sharjah and the Gustave Roussy Cancer Centre in Paris, a European oncology centre. SBCC provides a number of cancer therapies, including the early diagnosis of breast lesions; treatment recommendations; the administration of chemotherapy and breast surgery, including reconstructive surgery.
