= Nivedhithaa Sathish =

Indian actress

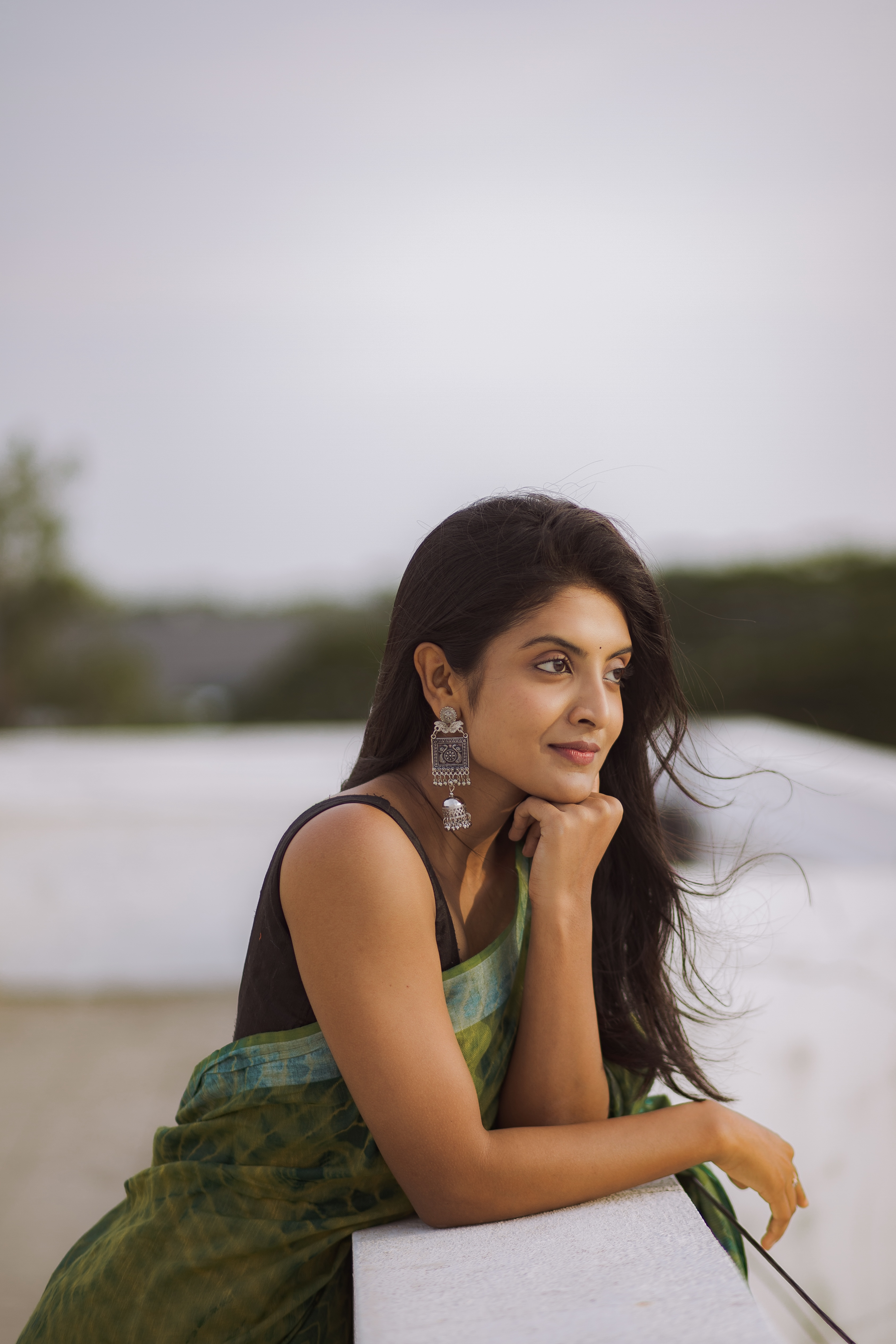
- Nivedhithaa Sathish in 2024
- Born: 26 September 1998 (age 28); Chennai, India
- Occupation: Actress
- Years active: 2017–present

Nivedhithaa Sathish is an Indian actress who works predominantly in the Tamil and Telugu film industries.

== Career ==
Nivedhithaa made her acting debut in the Tamil film Magalir Mattum (2017). She played the younger version of Saranya under the direction of Bramma G.

In 2019, she played one of the leads in the episode Kakka Kadi in the anthology film Sillu Karupatti, and in the following year 2020 she had a lead role in Sethum Aayiram Pon, as a young woman who visits her ailing grandmother. Haricharan Pudipeddi of Hindustan Times quoted that "After Sillu Karuppatti, Nivedhithaa walks away with another splendid performance".

In 2021, she got featured in Udanpirappe playing the daughter of Jyothika and Samuthirakani

In 2022, she featured in the web series Suzhal: The Vortex, directed by Pushkar and Gayathri. She played the role of Lakshmi.

In 2023, she acted alongside Dhanush stars as a pivotal character Thaenpasiyaar in the action period film Captain Miller, produced by Sathya Jyothi Films and directed by Arun Matheswaran.

== Personal life ==
Nivedhithaa was born and raised in Chennai to a Telugu family. Her native town is Guntur. She enrolled at a private college in Chennai for a degree in visual communication. However, after receiving an offer to be part of Sillu Karupatti in her second year, followed by Sethum Aayiram Pon, she could not complete her degree. In September 2026, Nivedhithaa got engaged to Suhayb Mohammed, an entrepreneur and photographer.

== Filmography ==
Key
†	Denotes films that have not yet been released

- All films are in Tamil, unless mentioned.

Year	Title	Role	Notes
2017	Magalir Mattum	Younger Subbulakshmi	
2017	Hello	Kavita	Telugu film
2019	Sillu Karupatti	Madhu	Segment: "Kakka Kadi"
2020	Indha Nilai Maarum	Deva's friend	
2020	Sethum Aayiram Pon	Meera	Also singer for "Panjaarathu Kili"
2021	Udanpirappe	Keerthana	Nominated - Filmfare Award for Best Supporting Actress – Tamil
2024	Captain Miller	Thaenpasiyaar	
2024	Minmini	Sindhu	Cameo appearance
2026	Oh Butterfly	Gouri	

=== Web series ===
Year	Title	Role	Language	Platform
2022	Suzhal: The Vortex	Lakshmi	Tamil	Amazon Prime Video
2022	Anya's Tutorial	Anya	Telugu; Tamil	aha
