= Sheikh Zayed Festival =

Annual Emiratis culture and heritage festival in Abu Dhabi

Sheikh Zayed Festival مهرجان الشيخ زايد
- Genre: Heritage, Cultural Festival and other genres
- Venue: Zayed Festival Village
- Location: Al Wathba South-Abu Dhabi U.A.E
- Coordinates: 24.221564°N 54.686764°E
- Years active: 2021–present
- Inaugurated: November 18, 2021
- Founders: Mohamed bin Zayed Al Nahyan, Mansour bin Zayed Al Nahyan
- Most recent: November 2, 2024 – February 28, 2025
- Next event: November 2, 2025 – February 28, 2025
- Website: zayedfestival.ae/en/

The Sheikh Zayed Festival or Zayed Festival (Arabic: مهرجان الشيخ زايد) is an annual Emirati heritage event in Al Wathba South-Abu Dhabi United Arab Emirates, which began in 2021.

== Pavilions ==
Zayed Festival includes pavilions, decorated in style of different countries and cultures.

== List of countries at Zayed Festival ==
- Yemen
- Egypt
- Morocco
- Turkey
- Japan
- China
- Pakistan
- India
- United States
- Iran
- Syria
- Thailand

== New Year's Eve activities ==
Zayed Festival New Year's Eve is an annual event held every 31 December at Zayed Festival Village, organised by The Supreme Organising Committee. The event consists of fireworks launched in Festival Village, a light and laser show, and an accompanying soundtrack.

== Awards ==
Sheikh Zayed Festival set three Guinness World Records on New Year's Eve 2022 with the largest fireworks display.
