= Al Wathba, Abu Dhabi =

Al Wathba ٱلْوَثْبَة Zayed Festival Village
- Satellite town
- Location in the UAE Al Wathba (Asia)
- Coordinates: 24°12′17.21″N 54°42′19.99″E
- Country: United Arab Emirates
- Emirate: Abu Dhabi
- Municipal region: Abu Dhabi Region

Government
  - Type: Absolute monarchy
  - Sheikh: Khalifa bin Zayed
  - Crown Prince: Mohammed bin Zayed
- Time zone: UTC+4 (UAE standard time)

Al Wathba (Arabic: ٱلْوَثْبَة, romanized: Al-Wathbah) is a suburb of Abu Dhabi in the United Arab Emirates that has a wetland nearby. It is located not too far from Zayed International Airport. It is also known as Zayed Festival village because of the Sheikh Zayed Festival, an important festival in Abu Dhabi which is held here.

Al Wathba was introduced after Sheikh Zayed bin Sultan Al Nahyan became the Ruler of the Emirate of Abu Dhabi in 1966, he set about further developing the Emirate, spending on healthcare, education and infrastructure. As part of his plan to develop the city of Abu Dhabi, in the 1980s, he invited Sir William Sydney Atkins, of the company W.S. Atkins and Partners (Atkins), to plan the development of Abu Dhabi and what would become the satellites of Al Wathba, Al Shahama and Baniyas, where a number of local Bedouins and immigrants from other parts of the Arabian Peninsula had settled under Sheikh Zayed's encouragement.

== Wetland reserve ==
Al Wathba Wetland Reserve
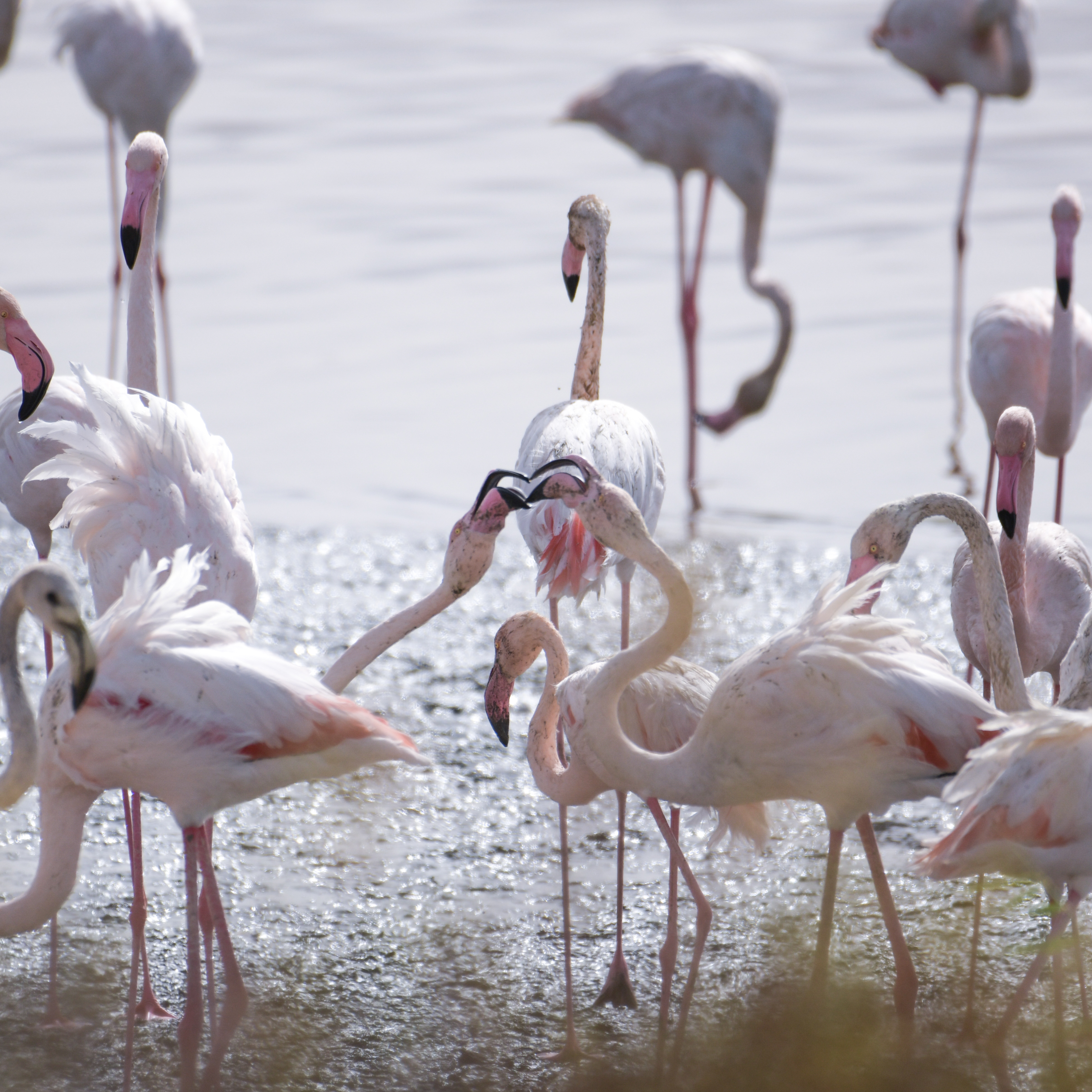
- Greater flamingoes at Al Wathba

- Location within United Arab Emirates
- Location: Abu Dhabi, the UAE
- Nearest city: Abu Dhabi
- Coordinates: 24°15′14.45″N 54°36′33.95″E
- Area: 5 km^{2} (1.9 sq mi)
- Established: 2008
- Governing body: Environment Agency Abu Dhabi

Ramsar Wetland
- Official name: Al Wathba Wetland Reserve
- Designated: 25 April 2013
- Reference no.: 2142

Located between Bani Yas, Mussafah, and the Abu Dhabi–Al Ain Road, Al Wathba Wetland Reserve was established by Sheikh Zayed in 1998, and is home to birds such as the greater flamingo, besides aquatic life. The reserve has been designated as a Ramsar site since 2013.

== Al Wathba Jail ==
in the 1990s, Filipino worker Sarah Balabagan was held here on charges of murdering her employer which she claims was an act self-defence. She was initially sentenced to death but was later pardoned after intervention from Sheikh Zayed. Her sentence was shortened to 1 year and she was later deported back to the Philippines.

In 2009, a member of the Abu Dhabi royal family, Issa bin Zayed Al Nahyan, was the subject of a lawsuit brought to him by his employee whom he allegedly imprisoned and tortured in Al Wathba Jail.

In 2011, Ahmad Mansoor, who received the prestigious Martin Ennals Award for Human Rights Defenders in 2015 was jailed for speech related activity “publishing false information and rumours", Mansoor was held in solitary confinement and prohibited access to a lawyer. Prisoners are reported to have access to rehabilitation programs, including vocational training, educational programs, and religious guidance aimed at reintegrating inmates into society.

== Notable events which happened in Al Wathba ==
The following is a notable events happened in Al Wathba

=== Sheikh Zayed Festival ===
The Sheikh Zayed Festival is one of the largest heritage events in the Emirate of Abu Dhabi, which sheds light on multiple bright aspects of the heritage and culture of the United Arab Emirates

== Notable people ==
- Hazza Al Mansouri, Emirati astronaut

== See also ==
- Al Marmoom Desert Conservation Reserve, Dubai
- Dubai Desert Conservation Reserve
- Jebel Hafeet National Park, Abu Dhabi
- Mangrove National Park, Abu Dhabi
- Ras Al Khor, Dubai
- Sir Abu Nu'ayr, Sharjah
- Sir Bani Yas, Abu Dhabi
- Wadi Wurayah, Fujairah
- Wildlife of the United Arab Emirates
