= Halitha Shameem =

Indian director and screenwriter

- Born: 12 September; Dharapuram, Tirupur, Tamil Nadu, India
- Occupations: Film director Screenwriter; Film Editing
- Years active: 2014–present

Halitha Shameem is an Indian film director, screenwriter, and editor who predominantly works in Tamil cinema.

== Life ==
After assisting in movies such as Oram Po (2007), she debuted as a director with Poovarasam Peepee in 2014. After a gap of more than 5 years, she then directed the critically and commercially successful anthology film Sillu Karupatti (2019) and Aelay (2021) which is available on Netflix.

She directed the first half of her upcoming film Minmini in 2015 and the second half in 2022 with the same actors as it requires different age groups of the artists. Instead of using different actors for different age groups, she waited for 7 years for the actors to grown up and filmed with the same actors.

== Filmography ==
Year	Film	Credited as			Notes
Year	Film	Director	Writer	Editor	Notes
2014	Poovarasam Peepee	Yes	Yes	Yes	
2019	Sillu Karupatti	Yes	Yes	Yes	All segments
2021	Aelay	Yes	Yes	Yes	Television film
2022	Putham Pudhu Kaalai Vidiyaadhaa	Yes	Yes	No	Segment: Loners
2024	Minmini	Yes	Yes	No	Also lyricist
2025	Good Wife	No	Yes	No	Web Series
