= List of accolades received by Super Deluxe (film) =

Accolades
Award	Wins	Nominations
Ananda Vikatan Cinema Awards	4	4
Australian Academy of Cinema and Television Arts Awards	0	1
Critics' Choice Movie Awards	5	6
Edison Awards	2	7
Indian Film Festival of Melbourne	2	4
National Film Awards	1	1
South Indian International Movie Awards	0	5
Zee Cine Awards Tamil	5	5

Totals (Note: Certain award groups do not simply award one winner. They acknowledge several different recipients, have runners-up, and have third place. Since this is a specific recognition and is different from losing an award, runner-up mentions are considered wins in this award tally. For simplification and to avoid errors, each award in this list has been presumed to have had a prior nomination.)
- Wins: 19
- Nominations: 33

Super Deluxe is a 2019 Indian Tamil-language hyperlink film produced and directed by Thiagarajan Kumararaja, who also co-wrote the screenplay with Mysskin, Nalan Kumarasamy and Neelan K. Sekar. It featured an ensemble cast of Vijay Sethupathi, Fahadh Faasil, Samantha Akkineni, Ramya Krishnan, Mysskin, Gayathrie, Ashwanth Ashokkumar, Bagavathi Perumal and Mirnalini Ravi. The film featured cinematography handled jointly by P. S. Vinod and Nirav Shah, editing done by Sathyaraj Natarajan and music scored by Yuvan Shankar Raja. The film had four parallelly interwoven stories revolving around four individuals who find themselves in the most unexpected predicaments, each poised to experience their destiny, all on one fateful day. The film marked Thiagarajan Kumararaja's return to direction, since his debut film Aaranya Kaandam released eight years ago, in 2011.

The film was theatrically released on 29 March 2019 and received critical acclaim, praising the performances of the cast, especially for that of Vijay Sethupathi, who essayed the role of a transgender person. Super Deluxe was further screened at the Fantasia International Film Festival, the largest genre film festival in North America and Bucheon International Fantastic Film Festival. It was also featured in several Top 10 lists by several publications including The Times of India, The Indian Express, Sify and Film Companion. In 2019, Film Companion further ranked Vijay Sethupathi and Ashwanth Ashokkumar's performances in the list of "100 Greatest Performances of the Decade".

Super Deluxe won four Ananda Vikatan Cinema Awards, including Best Screenplay, Best Supporting Actor – Female (Ramya Krishnan), Best Cinematographer (P. S. Vinod and Nirav Shah), Best Music Director (Yuvan Shankar Raja). At the inaugural ceremony for Zee Cine Awards Tamil, Super Deluxe won five awards including Best Supporting Actor – Female (Ramya Krishnan), Best Child Artist (Ashwanth Ashokkumar), Best Editor (Sathyaraj Natarajan), Best Art Director (Vijay Adhinathan), and a Jury Special Award for Best Actress (Samantha Akkineni). The film further won two Edison Awards, four at the Critics' Choice Movie Awards including Best Movie of the Year and Best Film – Tamil, two awards at the Indian Film Festival of Melbourne, including an Honorary Award for Equality in Cinema, and a nomination at the 9th AACTA Awards, for Best Asian Film. On 22 March 2021, at the 67th National Film Awards held for Indian films released in 2019, Vijay Sethupathi won the National Film Award for Best Supporting Actor.

== Awards and nominations ==
Award (Note: Awards, festivals and organisations are in alphabetical order.)	Date of ceremony (Note: Date is linked to the article about the awards held that year, wherever possible.)	Category	Nominee(s)	Result	Ref.
Ananda Vikatan Cinema Awards	11 January 2020	Best Screenplay	Thiagarajan Kumararaja Mysskin Nalan Kumarasamy Neelan K. Sekar	Won	
Ananda Vikatan Cinema Awards	11 January 2020	Best Supporting Actor – Female	Ramya Krishnan	Won	
Ananda Vikatan Cinema Awards	11 January 2020	Best Cinematographer	Nirav Shah P. S. Vinod	Won	
Ananda Vikatan Cinema Awards	11 January 2020	Best Music Director	Yuvan Shankar Raja (Note: Also for Peranbu)	Won	
Australian Academy of Cinema and Television Arts Awards	4 December 2019	Best Asian Film	Super Deluxe	Nominated	
Critics' Choice Film Awards	14 March 2020	Best Movie of the Year	Super Deluxe	Won	
Critics' Choice Film Awards	14 March 2020	Best Film – Tamil	Super Deluxe	Won	
Critics' Choice Film Awards	14 March 2020	Best Director – Tamil	Thiagarajan Kumararaja	Won	
Critics' Choice Film Awards	14 March 2020	Best Actor – Tamil	Vijay Sethupathi	Won	
Critics' Choice Film Awards	14 March 2020	Best Actress – Tamil	Samantha Akkineni	Nominated	
Critics' Choice Film Awards	14 March 2020	Best Writing – Tamil	Thiagarajan Kumararaja Mysskin Nalan Kumarasamy Neelan K. Sekar	Won	
Edison Awards	12 January 2020	Best Director	Thiagarajan Kumararaja	Nominated	
Edison Awards	12 January 2020	Best Screenplay	Thiagarajan Kumararaja	Nominated	
Edison Awards	12 January 2020	Best Actor	Vijay Sethupathi	Nominated	
Edison Awards	12 January 2020	Best Actress	Samantha Akkineni	Nominated	
Edison Awards	12 January 2020	Best Supporting Actress	Ramya Krishnan	Nominated	
Edison Awards	12 January 2020	Best Character Role – Female	Gayathrie	Won	
Edison Awards	12 January 2020	Best Child Artist	Ashwanth Ashokkumar	Won	
Indian Film Festival of Melbourne	8 August 2019	Best Director	Thiagarajan Kumararaja	Nominated	
Indian Film Festival of Melbourne	8 August 2019	Best Actor	Vijay Sethupathi	Won	
Indian Film Festival of Melbourne	8 August 2019	Best Film	Super Deluxe	Nominated	
Indian Film Festival of Melbourne	8 August 2019	Honorary Award – Equality in Cinema	Super Deluxe	Won	
National Film Awards	22 March 2021	Best Supporting Actor	Vijay Sethupathi	Won	
South Indian International Movie Awards	18 September 2021	Best Director – Tamil	Thiagarajan Kumararaja	Nominated	
South Indian International Movie Awards	18 September 2021	Best Actor – Tamil	Vijay Sethupathi	Nominated	
South Indian International Movie Awards	18 September 2021	Best Supporting Actress – Tamil	Ramya Krishnan	Nominated	
South Indian International Movie Awards	18 September 2021	Best Actor in a Negative Role – Tamil	Bagavathi Perumal	Nominated	
South Indian International Movie Awards	18 September 2021	Best Debut Producer – Tamil	Tyler Durden and Kino Fest Alchemy Media Works East West Entertainment	Nominated	
Zee Cine Awards Tamil	4 January 2020	Best Actor – Female (Jury Special)	Samantha Akkineni	Won	
Zee Cine Awards Tamil	4 January 2020	Best Supporting Actor – Female	Ramya Krishnan	Won	
Zee Cine Awards Tamil	4 January 2020	Best Child Artist	Ashwanth Ashokkumar	Won	
Zee Cine Awards Tamil	4 January 2020	Best Editor	Sathyaraj Natarajan	Won	
Zee Cine Awards Tamil	4 January 2020	Best Art Director	Vijay Adhinathan	Won	

== See also ==
- List of Tamil films of 2019
