= Vikram Vedha =

2017 Indian film by Pushkar–Gayatri

- Theatrical release poster
- Directed by: Pushkar–Gayathri
- Written by: Pushkar–Gayathri
- Dialogues by: K. Manikandan
- Produced by: S. Sashikanth
- Starring: R. Madhavan; Vijay Sethupathi; Shraddha; Varalaxmi; Kathir
- Cinematography: P. S. Vinod
- Edited by: A. Richard Kevin
- Music by: Sam C. S.
- Production company: YNOT Studios
- Distributed by: Trident Arts
- Release date: 21 July 2017
- Running time: 147 minutes
- Country: India
- Language: Tamil
- Budget: ₹11 crore
- Box office: ₹60 crore

Vikram Vedha is a 2017 Indian Tamil-language neo-noir action thriller film written and directed by Pushkar–Gayathri and produced by YNOT Studios. The film, which is inspired by the Indian folktale Baital Pachisi, stars R. Madhavan and Vijay Sethupathi as the title characters, alongside Shraddha Srinath, Kathir, Varalaxmi Sarathkumar, Prem, Achyuth Kumar, Hareesh Peradi and Vivek Prasanna. In the film, Inspector Vikram sets out to track down and kill Vedha, a gangster. After voluntarily surrendering himself, Vedha tells Vikram three stories which change his perceptions of good and evil.

In January 2015, Sashikanth revealed that he would be producing a film directed by Pushkar–Gayathri. Following development of the script throughout 2015, Madhavan and Sethupathi were selected to play the lead roles in February 2016. Principal photography began in November of the same year and was completed by January 2017. The film was shot mainly in North Chennai, with the area being used as its backdrop. Sam C. S. composed the soundtrack and score, while P. S. Vinod and A. Richard Kevin handled the cinematography and editing respectively.

Vikram Vedha was released on 21 July 2017 to critical acclaim with critics praising its major technical aspects, music, script, cinematography, action sequences and cast performances (particularly Madhavan and Sethupathi). Made on a budget of ₹11 crores (about US$1,661,631 in 2017), the film performed well at the box office, grossing ₹60 crores (about US$9,063,444 in 2017) worldwide despite experiencing difficulties due to the changes resulting from the implementation of the GST. Vikram Vedha won four Filmfare, Vijay and Norway Tamil Film Festival awards each. Additionally, it received three Ananda Vikatan Cinema Awards, two Techofes Awards and an Edison Award. In 2022, the film was remade in Hindi under the same title by the same director duo.

== Plot ==
Vikram is a righteous police inspector with a rigid, black-and-white view of morality, while Vedha is a notorious gangster who operates within the gray areas of good and evil. Vikram's close friend, Simon, leads an encounter squad specifically formed to eliminate Vedha's criminal syndicate. During a raid, the unit executes several of Vedha's henchmen and frames an unarmed youth to avoid judicial scrutiny. As the squad plans its next operation, Vedha unexpectedly walks into the police headquarters and voluntarily surrenders.

During his interrogation by Vikram, Vedha offers to tell a story about his rise as a drug smuggler. He explains how he tried to shield his mathematically gifted younger brother, Vignesh "Pulli," from the criminal underworld. However, a rival gangster named Ravi forced Pulli to carry contraband. When apprehended, Pulli confessed, leading to Ravi's arrest. On the orders of his boss, Sangu, Ravi later assaulted Pulli, leaving a permanent scar on his hand. Vedha presents Vikram with a moral riddle: should he kill the weapon (Ravi) or the mastermind (Sangu)? Vikram answers that Sangu is the true culprit, and Vedha implies he acted accordingly. Soon after, Vikram's defense attorney wife, Priya, secures Vedha's bail. Vikram then makes a horrifying realization: the unarmed youth his squad killed and framed in the earlier encounter was actually Pulli. Fearing Vedha has targeted Simon in retaliation, Vikram rushes to find him, only to discover Simon and Pulli's girlfriend, Chandra, shot dead. SP Surendhar quickly dismisses the deaths as a botched encounter.

After Priya refuses to disclose Vedha’s location, an enraged Vikram tracks him down to a forest to execute him. Vedha subdues him after sharing a second story regarding an adult Pulli laundering syndicate funds into the stock market. When a substantial sum invested by Vedha's superior, Cheta, went missing alongside Chandra, it was revealed she had stolen it for a new life but returned out of love for Pulli. Cheta ordered Chandra's execution, prompting Vedha to ask Vikram if he should obey his boss or protect his family. Vikram chooses family, validating Vedha's past actions. Vedha then urges Vikram to look deeper into the suspicious murders of Simon and Pulli.

Vikram's independent investigation leads him to Simon's dead informant and a hired assassin who uses distinct marijuana-laced cigars, a trait tying back to Ravi. Vikram tracks Vedha and a captured Ravi to an abandoned factory, where Vedha delivers the final act. He reveals that Simon had accepted bribes from Ravi to systematically eliminate Vedha's men to fund his son's expensive medical treatments. Before Vikram can interrogate him further, Vedha executes Ravi.

SP Surendhar and the encounter unit suddenly arrive, trapping Vikram. Vikram pieces together the truth: the entire squad, not just Simon, was on Ravi's payroll to wipe out Vedha's empire. Chandra's abduction was orchestrated to lure Pulli and Vedha into the open. A guilt-ridden Simon had tried to rescue Chandra, but when a gang member killed her, Simon slaughtered the remaining thugs, only to be executed by Surendhar to protect the squad's corruption. Before the corrupt officers can execute Vikram, Vedha ambushes the unit. In the ensuing shootout, Vikram and Vedha eliminate the squad, with Vikram personally killing Surendhar. The narrative concludes with a tense philosophical standoff as Vikram holds Vedha at gunpoint, caught in a moral paradox over whether to arrest his savior or uphold the law.

== Cast ==
=== The Cops ===
- R. Madhavan as Inspector Vikram
- Prem Kumar as Simon
- Achyuth Kumar as Surendhar
- Manikandan as Santhanam
- George Vijay Nelson as Prabhakar
- Babu as Ansari
- Vaaladi E. Karthik as Pandian
- E. Ramdoss as Velraj
- Satya as Hari
- Gopi as Thiyagarajan

=== The Gangsters ===
- Vijay Sethupathi as Vedha
- Hareesh Peradi as Cheta
- Vivek Prasanna as Ravi
- Augustine as Vellai
- Kutta as Ganja
- Amar as Sangu
- Siva as Dilli
- Sugunthan as Jijo
- Babu as Gundu Babu
- Vijay Muthu as Muni
- Ashok as Kaattai

=== The Families ===
- Shraddha as Priya
- Varalaxmi as Chandra
- Kathir as Vignesh (Pulli)
- Gowrilakshmi G as Anitha
- J. K. Abhay as Alex
- Akash as young Pulli
- Vaishnavi as young Chandra
- Gaurav Kalai as Dilip

== Production ==
=== Development ===
After the release of Va (2010), the husband and wife director duo, Pushkar and Gayathri, took a break from filmmaking. They decided to explore other genres during this time as their earlier films, Oram Po (2007) and Va, were comedies. The duo planned to make their next project, which would be titled Vikram Vedha, with a more serious tone where emotions like anger, hatred, and pain drove the characters' motives. This led to their decision to develop characters whose actions are not entirely good or evil.

The duo initially considered setting the film either in politics, business or journalism before finally deciding on a police-gangster background. The Indian folktale Baital Pachisi inspired the development of the story. The ghost-like being Vetala who posed morally ambiguous questions to King Vikramaditya, each of which could result in more than one answer, attracted them. The film's title and its characterisation of Vikram (Vikramaditya) and Vedha (Vetala) were also derived from the tale.

In a January 2015 interview with journalist and film critic Sudhish Kamath of The Hindu, S. Sashikanth, the owner of production house YNOT Studios, confirmed that he would produce the project. Pushkar and Gayathri continued to develop the script throughout 2015, completing it in April 2016. Dhilip Subbarayan and P. S. Vinod were selected to be the stunt choreographer and cinematographer respectively. Richard Kevin also worked as an assistant director in addition to handling the film's editing. Manikandan was selected to write the dialogues after initially auditioning for and then playing the role of Santhanam.

=== Casting ===
We were sure that Vedha would be perfect for Vijay Sethupathi. The way we had imagined Vedha, the way Vijay talks, the way he even draws analogy or shares anecdotes is very similar to Vedha. We, in fact, noticed this only after we had narrated the script [to Sethupathi]. Vikram was more suited for Madhavan because he had to play Vikram who is kind of straight forward. Maddy was perfect to play something like that. Vedha, on the other hand, does everything in a roundabout manner.

— Pushkar and Gayathri on why they chose Madhavan and Sethupathi for the lead characters

Pushkar and Gayathri met R. Madhavan while working on the post-production phase of Sudha Kongara's Irudhi Suttru (2016). It was confirmed in February 2016 that Madhavan and Vijay Sethupathi would play the respective roles of an encounter specialist and a gangster. They agreed to do the project as both were intrigued by the idea of a film based on the Baital Pachisi tale. In addition to growing a beard for his role, Madhavan did not workout to lose weight. Instead, he followed a strict diet, including not eating anything after 6:00 pm and keeping a gap of five and a half hours after each meal. Sethupathi sported a salt and pepper beard for the role of Vedha.

Kathir was cast in the role of Vedha's brother Pulli because Pushkar and Gayathri were impressed by his performance in Kirumi (2015). In October 2016, Shraddha Srinath was cast as Vikram's wife after her performance in U Turn (2016) made an impression on Pushkar and Gayathri. This was then officially finalised after her screen test. The same month, John Vijay was signed to play a gangster but later opted out due to scheduling conflicts with the Malayalam film Comrade in America (2017).

=== Filming ===
Vikram Vedha was made on a budget of ₹11 crores (about US$1,661,631 in 2017). Principal photography began on 16 November 2016 in Kasimedu, North Chennai with Varalaxmi Sarathkumar joining the team as the second female lead. The first schedule consisted of filming scenes featuring Sethupathi, Kathir and Varalaxmi for five days. The second schedule commenced on 28 November 2016 with additional scenes involving Sethupathi shot at Vyasarpadi.

On 15 December 2016, Madhavan began shooting for his solo sequences and the portions where he appears alongside Sethupathi in the middle of the second schedule. The climax sequence was filmed over four days at Binny Mills. Production continued throughout December 2016, with Sethupathi finishing his work in early January 2017. Principal photography concluded later that month after sequences featuring Madhavan and Shraddha were shot. The entire film was completed over a period of 53 days.

=== Opening sequence ===
Sandhya Prabhat and Jemma Jose designed the opening animated sequence which Nassar narrated. In an interview with S. Naagarajan of The New Indian Express, Prabhat said that Pushkar and Gayathri wanted her "to adapt the theme of the [Baital Pachisi] for the opening credits". After drafting the initial sketches of the animated characters, the duo then gave Prabhat "a scene-by-scene picturisation" of their perspective of the tale in addition to requesting she make the entire sequence "look aesthetic". Prabhat and Jose designed the sequence to synchronise with the track "Karuppu Vellai".

According to Jose, the colouring for the sequence was mainly grey, black, and white and shades of red for Vetala's eyes, in keeping with the film's theme. Pushkar and Gayathri wanted Prabhat and Jose to use a "desaturated" palette with "strong and powerful" tones. The sequence was traditionally animated as Prabhat and Jose believed that "complex graphics and multi-layered effects" would distract the audience from understanding the film's main plot. The entire animated sequence, from storyboarding to animation took one and a half months to complete.

== Themes and influences ==
As the film is inspired from Baital Pachisi, it consists of an animated sequence involving Vikramaditya and Vetala, on which the main characters Vikram and Vedha are formed. For the title, the film's title designer Gopi Prasannaa revealed that the swirls in the Tamil letters 'Vi' and 'Th' symbolise the sword of Vikram and the tail of Vedalam.

== Music ==
The soundtrack album for Vikram Vedha and the background score was composed by Sam C. S. with lyrics written by Mohan Rajan, Muthamil, Vignesh Shivan and the composer respectively. Sam had previously worked with Pushkar and Gayathri on television commercials, before they decided to recruit him, after his work on Puriyatha Puthir, which was his debut film.

== Marketing ==
The film's official title poster was released on 2 February 2017. The official first look poster of the film was released on 24 February 2017. The teaser trailer, featuring action sequences between Madhavan and Vijay Sethupathi, was released on 13 March 2017. The official trailer was released by actors Shah Rukh Khan and Sivakarthikeyan, through YouTube on 22 June 2017.

== Release ==
=== Theatrical ===
Vikram Vedha was initially given an "A" certificate by the Central Board of Film Certification due to the amount of violence present. The producers, however, successfully approached the revising committee to get a "U/A" certificate (parental guidance) to appeal to family audiences.

The film was scheduled to release on 7 July 2017, but was postponed due to the strike by the Tamil Film Producers Council over the implementation of the Goods and Services Tax in India and the removal of the Local Body Tax imposed by the Government of Tamil Nadu on the council. After the state government reached an agreement with the Producer's Council to set up a committee to look into the issue, screening of films at theatres resumed on 6 July. Vikram Vedha was subsequently released worldwide on 21 July 2017. R. Ravindran under his Trident Arts banner distributed the film in Tamil Nadu and released it to 350 screens across the state. ATMUS Entertainment handled distribution in the United States.

== Reception ==
=== Box office ===
Vikram Vedha grossed ₹170 million worldwide in the first weekend of its theatrical run, earning ₹100 million in Tamil Nadu alone. By the end of its second weekend, the total box office collections for the film in Tamil Nadu were ₹250 million. Within two weeks of its release, the film earned ₹400 million worldwide becoming, at the time of its release, the second-highest grossing Tamil film of the year after Baahubali 2: The Conclusion.

The film also performed well in the United States, earning more than $150,000 in its first three days. It collected $366,000 by the end of the first week. Vikram Vedha completed a theatrical run of 100 days on 28 October. As of December 2017, the film has earned ₹600 million (about US$9,063,444 in 2017) globally.

The content of the film and its commercial success helped revive the box office prospects of the Tamil film industry, leading to many theatre owners and distributors like Abirami Ramanathan, owner of Abhirami Mega Mall, and K Meenakshisundaram, vice-president of Mayajaal, stating that people would come to watch films with good content irrespective of the Goods and Services Tax.

=== Critical response ===
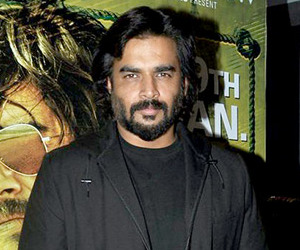
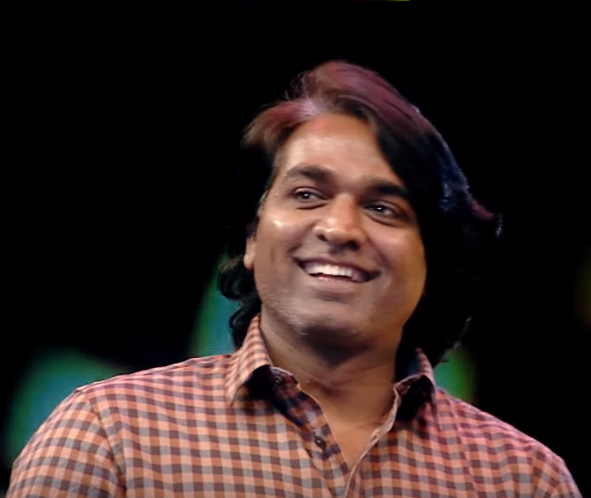
The performances of Madhavan and Sethupathi, were praised by critics.

Vikram Vedha opened to critical acclaim with praise for all major aspects of the production.

Writing for The Indian Express, Manoj Kumar R called it "the best film to release in Tamil this year". He felt that though both Madhavan and Sethupathi "have competed with each other" in providing performances that were "intense and convincing", it was Sethupathi who "manages to draw the applause and whistles from the audience for his natural performance". Karthik Kumar of the Hindustan Times labelled Madhavan's performance "good" and believed Sethupathi played Vedha with "unmatchable swag", adding he was "unarguably the best thing to have happened to the film". Srivatsan of India Today compared the interactions and mind games between Vikram and Vedha favourably to those of Batman and the Joker in The Dark Knight (2008); he termed the film a "smartly-written thriller, which has a texture, well-developed character arcs and filmmaking gimmickry".

M Suganth, in his review for The Times of India, found Madhavan to be "stylish and serious" and Sethupathi as "all swag". Anupama Subramaniam of the Deccan Chronicle said that Sethupathi "oozes of charisma" and Madhavan gave "a whole-hearted" effort while making the audience relate to the character's emotions. Ragesh Gopinathan from Malayala Manorama thought the film "a work of sheer brilliance" with "the perfect blend of style and substance". Gopinathan also believed that Srinath, Varalaxmi and Peradi "offer a realistic portrayal of their characters." In his review for Firstpost, Sreedhar Pillai described the film as "a triumph of smart writing, superb characterisation and terrific performances by the lead actors Madhavan and Vijay Sethupathi who make it crackle". He also commended Varalaxmi's performance as Chandra, saying that she "lends the film some warmth" despite being cast in "an insignificant role". Film critic and journalist Baradwaj Rangan noted in his review for Film Companion that Sethupathi was "fantastic" and spoke "crowd-pleasing lines in the most casual fashion". He also found Chandra "the most convincingly written character". A reviewer from Sify pointed out that Madhavan's "subtle" and Sethupathi "inimitable" performances were the "real strength" of the film, adding that Srinath was "brilliant" and Varalaxmi appeared "audacious and innocent" throughout. The Quint's Vikram Venkateswaran called Madhavan's performance "flawless" adding that the actor "simply eats up the screen" with his presence. He however criticised Sethupathi, opining that he "has played himself for far too long" saying there is "so much more to him than just the fact that he’s as relatable as a friendly neighbourhood smart alec".

Suganth noted that all the conversations between the characters, and even the opening sequence, were "carefully assembled puzzle pieces". However, he criticised the convoluted plot structure and the "lack of gravitas", which made the film seem "tiresome" and "laidback". Vishal Menon of The Hindu wrote the film was "a terrific exploration of good, evil and everything in between" but felt the second half took "the shape of an investigative thriller" which slowed down the film's pace. Karthik commended Pushkar and Gayathri's writing which "succeeds in piquing the intellect of audiences like no recent Tamil film". The Sify reviewer praised the directors' handling of human emotions, calling the characters' grey shades "a novel aspect". Furthermore, Priyanka Thirumurthy of The News Minute wrote that the directors' "intelligent screenplay takes you through a rollercoaster of twists and turns". Likewise, Sudhir Srinivasan, writing for The New Indian Express praised Pushkar and Gayathri's "beautifully written, incredibly well-made" contemporary adaptation of the Baital Pachisi. Mythily Ramachandran, in her review for Gulf News, believed the "powerful writing" of Puskhar and Gayathri's screenplay, the "well defined" characters and "flawless performances" from the entire cast, were the film's main highlights.

Several critics found Vinod's past experiences in shooting gangster films such as Thiagarajan Kumararaja's Aaranya Kaandam (2011) a contributing factor towards the success of Vikram Vedha. Pillai and the Sify reviewer found Vinod's cinematography and camera angles helped create the appropriate "tension and mood" and perfectly capture the environment of North Chennai. Rangan compared the cinematography positively to the "light and shadow play" seen in film noir, concluding that "there isn't one uninteresting frame" and the film can be watched for the filming techniques alone.

=== Accolades ===
At the 65th Filmfare Awards South, Vikram Vedha received nominations in seven categories, including Best Film (Sashikanth) and Best Supporting Actress (Varalaxmi), winning four. Madhavan and Sethupathi received nominations in the Best Actor category with the latter winning the award; Madhavan in turn won the Critics Best Actor – Tamil. The other awards it received were for Best Director (Pushkar–Gayathri) and Best Male Playback Singer (Anirudh for "Yaanji"). The film won four of its fifteen nominations at the 10th Vijay Awards, including Best Director and Best Screenplay Writer (both received by Pushkar–Gayathri), Best Actor (Sethupathi) and Best Background Score (Sam). The film also won four Norway Tamil Film Festival Awards, three Ananda Vikatan Cinema Awards, two Techofes Awards, an Edison Award, and four Tamil Nadu State Film Awards.

== Remake ==
In March 2018, Pushkar–Gayathri announced that they would direct the film's Hindi remake, to be produced again by YNOT Studios. The Hindi remake, also titled Vikram Vedha, was released on 30 September 2022.

== In popular culture ==
The interrogation scene from Vikram Vedha was parodied in Tamizh Padam 2.
