= 13th Ananda Vikatan Cinema Awards =

- Date: 11 January 2020
- Site: Chennai, Tamil Nadu, India

Highlights
- Best Picture: Peranbu
- Most awards: Asuran
- Most nominations: Super Deluxe

The 13th Ananda Vikatan Cinema Awards ceremony honoring the winners and nominees of the best of Tamil cinema in 2019 is an event that was held on 11 January 2020 in Chennai, India.

== Awards and nominations ==
Best Film	Best Director
Peranbu; Super Deluxe; Nerkonda Paarvai; Oththa Seruppu Size 7; Asuran; Sillu Karupatti	Vetrimaaran – Asuran; Ram – Peranbu; Thiagarajan Kumararaja – Super Deluxe; R. Parthiban – Oththa Seruppu Size 7; Lokesh Kanagaraj – Kaithi; Halitha Shameem - Sillu Karupatti
Best Actor	Best Actress
Dhanush – Asuran; Rajinikanth – Petta; Mammootty – Peranbu; Vijay Sethupathi – Super Deluxe; Suriya – NGK; Ajith Kumar – Nerkonda Paarvai; R. Parthiban - Oththa Seruppu Size 7; Sivakarthikeyan - Namma Veetu Pillai; Karthi - Kaithi; Vijay - Bigil	Taapsee Pannu – Game Over; Sadhana – Peranbu; Tamannaah– Kanne Kalaimaane; Nayanthara – Airaa; Samantha Akkineni – Super Deluxe; Shilpa Manjunath – Ispade Rajavum Idhaya Raniyum; Jyothika - Raatchasi; Amala Paul - Aadai; Shraddha Srinath - Nerkonda Paarvai; Archana - Azhiyatha Kolangal 2
Best Supporting Actor	Best Supporting Actress
George Maryan – Kaithi; Nedumudi Venu – Sarvam Thaala Mayam; Mysskin – Super Deluxe; Ken Karunas – Asuran; Mu. Ramasamy – K.D.	Ramya Krishnan – Super Deluxe; Vidya Pradeep – Thadam; Vinodhini – Game Over; Sriranjani – House Owner; Aishwarya Rajesh – Namma Veetu Pillai; Sunaina – Sillu Karupatti
Best Villain - Male	Best Villain - Female
Stunt Siva – Champion; Nawazuddin Siddiqui – Petta; Bagavathi Perumal – Super Deluxe; Arjun Chidambaram – Nerkonda Paarvai; Arjun Das – Kaithi	Dhansika – Iruttu; Madhoo – Agni Devi; Jasmine – Kadaram Kondan; Akanksha Puri – Action
Best Comedian - Male	Best Comedian - Female
Anandaraj – Jackpot; Rajendran – Dhilluku Dhuddu 2; Karunakaran – Monster; Yogi Babu – Comali; Dheena – Kaithi	Urvashi – Dhilluku Dhuddu 2; Revathy – Jackpot; Devadarshini – Kanchana 3; Kovai Sarala – Kanchana 3; Radhika Sarathkumar – Market Raja MBBS
Best Child Artist	Best Debut Director
Naga Vishal - K.D.; Ashwath - Super Deluxe; Suriya - Sindhubaadh; Kamalesh - Raatchasi; Manasavi - Iruttu	Chezhiyan – To Let; V J Gopinath – Jiivi; Gowtham Raj – Raatchasi; Pradeep Ranganathan – Comali; Sri Senthil – Kaalidas
Best Debut - Male	Best Debut - Female
Dhruv Vikram – Adithya Varma; Santhosh – To Let; Rangaraj – Mehandi Circus; Aarav Ravi – Market Raja MBBS; Vishwa - Champion	Lijomol Jose – Sivappu Manjal Pachai; Anjali Nair - Nedunalvaadai; Priyanka – Gangs of Madras; Sathyakala – Thoratti; Megha Akash – Enai Noki Paayum Thota
Best Music Director	Best Lyricist
Yuvan Shankar Raja – Peranbu, Super Deluxe & NGK; Anirudh – Petta; D. Imman – Viswasam; A. R. Rahman – Sarvam Thaala Mayam; Hiphop Tamizha – Natpe Thunai; Ghibran - Kadaram Kondan; G.V. Prakash Kumar - Asuran; Sam CS - Kaithi; Darbuka Siva - Enai Noki Paayum Thota	Yugabharathi – "Vellattu Kananzhagi" – Mehandi Circus & "Ellu Vayal" - Asuran; Arunraja Kamaraj – "Dingu Dungu" – Sarvam Thaala Mayam; Karthik Netha – "Andhi Maalai" – Monster; Thamarai – "Maruvaarthai" – Enai Noki Paayum Thota; Umadevi – "Neelam elam" – Irandam Ulagaporin Kadaisi Gundu
Best Playback Singer – Male	Best Playback Singer – Female
Sid Sriram – "Maruvaarthai" – Enai Noki Paayum Thota; Nakash Aziz – "Ullala" – Petta; Anirudh – "Petta Paraak" – Petta; Ram Parthasarathi – "Vanthooral" – Peranbu; Chitheresan, Arivu, Gaana Muthu & Ezhumalai – "Neelamelam" – Irandam Ulagaporin Kadaisi Gundu	Saindhavi – "Ellu Vayal" – Asuran; Madhu Iyer – "Sethupochu Manasu" – Peranbu; Rita Thiyagarajan – "Yaayum" – Sagaa; Padmapriya Raghavan – "Meghathooral" – Airaa; Shreya Ghoshal – "Anbe Peranbe" – NGK
Best Story	Best Screenplay
Adhiyan Aadhirai – Irandam Ulagaporin Kadaisi Gundu; Sanmugabharathi, Vivek & Elangovan– Vellai Pookal; Nelson Venkatesan & Sankar Das – Monster; Ashwin Saravanan & Kaavya Ramkumar - Game Over; Madhumitha – K.D.	Thiagarajan Kumararaja, Mysskin, Nalan Kumarasamy & Neelan K Sekar – Super Deluxe; Magizh Thirumeni – Thadam; Ashwin Saravanan & Kaavya Ramkumar – Game Over; Vetrimaaran & Mani Maaran – Asuran; Lokesh Kanagaraj – Kaithi
Best Dialogue	Best Production Design
Sabarivaasan Shanmugam – K.D. shared with Halitha Shameem - Sillu Karupatti; Ram – Peranbu; Thiagarajan Kumararaja – Super Deluxe; Bharathi Thambi & Gowtham Raj – Raatchasi; Vetrimaaran & Suga – Asuran	Jackie – Asuran; Vijay Adhinathan – Super Deluxe; Sivashankar– Game Over; T. Ramakumar – Irandam Ulagaporin Kadaisi Gundu; Selvakumar– Hero
Best Cinematography	Best Editing
P.S. Vinod & Nirav Shah – Super Deluxe; Tirru – Petta; Theni Eswar – Peranbu; Ramji– Oththa Seruppu Size 7; Sathyan Suryan – Kaithi	Richard Kevin – Game Over; NP Srikanth– Thadam; Sathyaraj Natarajan – Super Deluxe; Shan Lokesh – Sivappu Manjal Pachai; Philomin Raj – Kaithi
Best Stunt	Best Dance Choreography
Anbariv – Kaithi; Jiles Kanchill & Naren Roni – Kadaram Kondan; Peter Hein – Asuran; Anbariv– Action; Stunt Silva – Enai Noki Paayum Thota	Shobi & Lalitha Shobi – "Verithanam" -Bigil; Baba Bhaskar "Ullala" – Petta; Jhonny – "Kantha Kananzhagi" - Namma Veetu Pillai; Sathish Krishnan - "Kaithiri" – Asuran; Sathish Krishnan – "Naan Pilaipeno" - Enai Noki Paayum Thota
Best Costume Design	Best Make Up
Uthara Menon – Enai Noki Paayum Thota; Niharika – Petta; Ezhilmathi – Super Deluxe; Komal Shahani – Bigil; Eka Lakhani – Adithya Varma	Nellai V Shanmugam, K. Velmurugan & Banu – Asuran; Banu & Vinoth – Petta; Ronex Saviour – Super Deluxe; Preetisheel & Pattanam Rashid – Bigil; Ganapathi – Hero
Best Crew	Best Production
Comali; Super Deluxe; Nerkonda Paarvai; Oththa Seruppu Size 7; Asuran; Sillu Karupatti	Saregama – K.D.; Sri Lakshmi Films – Peranbu; Dream Warriors – Raatchasi; Bioscope Film Framers – Oththa Seruppu Size 7; Neelam Productions – Irandam Ulagaporin Kadaisi Gundu; Divine Productions- Sillu Karupatti
Most Popular Film	Best Entertaining Film
Bigil; Petta; Viswasam; Namma Veetu Pillai; Asuran	Viswasam; Petta; Namma Veetu Pillai; Comali; Bigil

== Superlatives ==
Multiple Nominations
Awards	Film
17	Super Deluxe
14	Asuran
11	Petta
10	Peranbu
10	Kaithi
7	Enai Noki Paayum Thota
6	Game Over
6	Oththa Seruppu Size 7
6	Bigil
6	Sillu Karupatti
5	Raatchasi
5	Nerkonda Paarvai
5	Namma Veetu Pillai
5	K.D.
5	Irandam Ulagaporin Kadaisi Gundu
3	Viswasam
3	Sarvam Thaala Mayam
3	Thadam
3	NGK
3	Kadaram Kondan
3	Comali
2	Dhilluku Dhuddu 2
2	Airaa
2	Kanchana 3
2	Monster
2	Champion
2	Sivappu Manjal Pachai
2	Jackpot
2	Action
2	Iruttu

Multiple wins
Awards	Film
6	Asuran
4	Super Deluxe
3	K.D.
2	Peranbu
2	Game Over
2	Kaithi
2	Enai Noki Paayum Thota
2	Bigil

== See also ==
- Ananda Vikatan Cinema Awards
- List of Tamil films of 2019
