= Gopi Prasannaa =

Indian movie poster and production designer

- Occupations: Poster artist; production designer
- Years active: 2010–present
- Notable work: Aaranya Kaandam (2010); Kaththi (2014); 96 (2018); Master (2021)
- Website: gopiprasannaa.in

Gopi Prasannaa is an Indian graphic designer who has designed many movie posters in the South Indian film industry. His notable works include the graphic novel-style poster for Aaranya Kaandam (2010) and introducing first-look posters with Kaththi (2014). During the COVID-19 lockdown, he gained recognition for the nostalgic series 'Ninaivugalai Thedi'.

== Personal life ==
Prasannaa's first film in a theater was Salangai Oli (1983) when he was 6 years old. He was also interested in painting during his childhood. Prasannaa admires movie poster artists like Tom Martin and some Japanese artists. He was inspired from the hand-drawn movie hoardings of Chennai's golden era and Maniyan Selvam's illustrations in Ananda Vikatan magazines during his youth.

== Career ==
The poster of Aaranya Kaandam. Fully illustrated in yellow and black, styled as a graphic novel illustration.

Prasannaa initially worked as a programmer, tried his hand in gaming, advertising and branding, before starting a career as a publicity designer. His journey in publicity design began with the Tamil film Aaranya Kaandam, directed by Thiagarajan Kumararaja in 2010. The poster was styled as a graphic novel fully illustrated in yellow and black making it the first of its kind for the Tamil industry. In 2014, Prasannaa introduced the trend of first-look posters in Tamil cinema with the film Kaththi, a social drama directed by AR Murugadoss. During the COVID-19 lockdown in India, Prasannaa created a series of retro movie posters for films like Sadma, 16 Vayathinile, Mullum Malarum, Mouna Raagam, Antha 7 Naatkal which are part of the 10-part series. The series was named 'Ninaivugalai Thedi', which translates to 'chasing memories'. He drew inspiration from the poster of Salangai Oli for the series.

In 2021, the first-look poster of Master, directed by Lokesh Kanagaraj, released on New Year's Eve. It quickly went viral on social media and set records.

== Selected filmography ==
List of film posters designed by Gopi Prasannaa
| Year | Title | Director | Notes | Ref. |
|---|---|---|---|---|
| 2010 | Aaranya Kaandam | Thiagarajan Kumararaja | Debut as publicity designer 1st of 3 collaborations with Thiagarajan Kumararaja | |
| 2014 | Kaththi | AR Murugadoss | | |
| 2015 | O Kadhal Kanmani | Mani Ratnam | 1st of 6 collaborations with Mani Ratnam | |
| 2016 | Theri | Atlee | | |
| 2017 | Kaatru Veliyidai | Mani Ratnam | | |
| 2017 | Mersal | Atlee | | |
| 2018 | Chekka Chivantha Vaanam | Mani Ratnam | | |
| 2018 | Sarkar | AR Murugadoss | | |
| 2018 | 96 | Premkumar Chandran | | |
| 2019 | Super Deluxe | Thiagarajan Kumararaja | | |
| 2019 | Bigil | Atlee | | |
| 2019 | Nerkonda Paarvai | H. Vinoth | | |
| 2021 | Master | Lokesh Kanagaraj | 1st of 3 collaborations with Lokesh Kanagaraj | |
| 2022 | Beast | Nelson Dilipkumar | | |
| 2022 | Vikram | Lokesh Kanagaraj | | |
| 2022 | Ponniyin Selvan: I | Mani Ratnam | | |
| 2023 | Varisu | Vamshi Paidipally | | |
| 2023 | Thunivu | H. Vinoth | | |
| 2023 | Ponniyin Selvan: II | Mani Ratnam | | |
| 2023 | Modern Love Chennai | Thiagarajan Kumararaja (Ninaivo Oru Paravai) | Also debut as production designer | |
| 2023 | Leo | Lokesh Kanagaraj | | |
| 2024 | Ayalaan | R. Ravikumar | | |
| 2024 | The Greatest of All Time | Venkat Prabhu | | |
| 2024 | Vettaiyan | T. J. Gnanavel | | |
| 2024 | Meiyazhagan | Premkumar Chandran | | |
| 2024 | Amaran | Rajkumar Periasamy | | |
| 2025 | Vidaamuyarchi | Magizh Thirumeni | | |
| 2025 | Thug Life | Mani Ratnam | | |
| 2026 | Jana Nayagan | H. Vinoth | | |
| TBA | Dhruva Natchathiram: Chapter One – Yuddha Kaandam † | Gautham Vasudev Menon | | |

Key
| † | Denotes films that have not yet been released |
