= Vijay Award for Best Cinematographer =

Indian film award

The Vijay Award for Best Cinematographer is given by the Tamil-language Indian TV channel Star Vijay as part of its annual Vijay Awards ceremony for Tamil (Kollywood) films.

== The list ==
Here is a list of the award winners and the films for which they won.

Year	Cinematographer	Film	Link
2017	Ravi Varman	Kaatru Veliyidai	
2014	Gavemic U Ary	Jigarthanda	
2013	Rajiv Menon	Kadal	
2012	Gopi Amarnath	Pizza	
2011	P. S. Vinod	Aaranya Kaandam	
2010	R. Rathnavelu	Endhiran	
2009	Manoj Paramahamsa	Eeram	
2008	S. R. Kathir	Subramaniyapuram	
2007	Velraj	Polladhavan	
2006	P. C. Sriram	Varalaru	

== Nominations ==
- 2006 P. C. Sriram - Varalaru
  - Ravi Varman - Vettaiyaadu Vilaiyaadu
  - Nirav Shah - Pattiyal
- 2007 Velraj - Polladhavan
  - S. R. Kathir - Kattradhu Thamizh
  - Ramji - Paruthiveeran
  - K. V. Anand - Sivaji : The Boss
  - Nirav Shah - Billa
- 2008 S. R. Kathir - Subramaniapuram
  - Mahesh Muthuswami - Anjathey
  - R. Rathnavelu - Vaaranam Aayiram
  - Ravi Varman - Dasavathaaram
  - Sakthi Saravanan - Saroja
- 2009 Manoj Paramahamsa - Eeram
  - Nirav Shah - Sarvam
  - P. C. Sriram - Yaavarum Nalam
  - Rajesh Yadhav - Pokkisham
  - Tirru - Kanchivaram
- 2010 R. Rathnavelu - Enthiran
  - Santhosh Sivan - Raavanan
  - Nirav Shah - Madrasapattinam
  - M. Sukumar - Mynaa
  - Richard M. Nathan - Angadi Theru
- 2011 P. S. Vinod - Aaranya Kaandam
  - Om Prakash - Vaagai Sooda Vaa
  - Nirav Shah - Deiva Thirumagal
  - Ravi K. Chandran - 7 Aum Arivu
  - Velraj - Aadukalam
- 2012 Gopi Amarnath - Pizza
  - Prem - Naduvula Konjam Pakkatha Kaanom
  - Vijay Milton - Vazhakku Enn 18/9
  - Siddharth - Aravaan
  - Sukumar - Thadaiyara Thaakka
- 2013 Rajiv Menon - Kadal
  - Chezhiyan - Paradesi
  - George C. Williams - Raja Rani
  - Marc Koninckx - Maryan
  - Sanu John Varghese - Vishwaroopam
- 2014 Gavemic U Ary - Jigarthanda
  - G. Murali - Madras
  - Gokul Benoy - Pannaiyarum Padminiyum
  - R. D. Rajasekhar - Arima Nambi
  - Nirav Shah - Kaaviya Thalaivan

== See also ==
- Tamil cinema
- Cinema of India
