= Oopiri =

2016 film by Vamshi Paidipally

Oopiri / Thozha
- Theatrical release poster in Telugu
- Directed by: Vamshi Paidipally
- Screenplay by: Vamshi Paidipally
- Dialogues by: Abburi Ravi (Telugu); Raju Murugan (Tamil); Murugesh Babu (Tamil)
- Story by: Vamshi Paidipally; Hari; Solomon
- Based on: The Intouchables by Éric Toledano and Olivier Nakache
- Produced by: Prasad V. Potluri; Kavin Anne
- Starring: Akkineni Nagarjuna; Karthi; Tamannaah Bhatia
- Cinematography: P. S. Vinod
- Edited by: Madhu (Telugu); Praveen K. L. (Tamil)
- Music by: Gopi Sundar
- Production company: PVP Cinema
- Release date: 25 March 2016
- Running time: 158 minutes (Telugu); 154 minutes (Tamil)
- Country: India
- Languages: Telugu; Tamil

Oopiri (transl. Breath) is a 2016 Indian bilingual comedy-drama film directed by Vamshi Paidipally and produced by PVP Cinema. The film is shot simultaneously in Telugu and Tamil languages; the latter titled Thozha (transl. Friend). It stars Akkineni Nagarjuna, Karthi (in his Telugu debut) and Tamannaah Bhatia while Prakash Raj, Ali, Vivek, Jayasudha, Kalpana and Tanikella Bharani playing supporting roles. The narrative focuses on the lives of Vikramaditya, a quadriplegic billionaire, and Seenu, his ex-convict caretaker, highlighting their realisation of the importance of life and relationships over money and disability.

Oopiri is a remake of Éric Toledano and Olivier Nakache's French film The Intouchables (2011). The rights to remake The Intouchables were acquired by Karan Johar and Guneet Monga in May 2014, who later authorised PVP Cinema to produce adaptations in regional languages, making Oopiri its first remake. Principal photography took place from March 2015 to February 2016 in locations including Chennai, Hyderabad, Paris, Belgrade and Novi Sad. Gopi Sundar composed the film's music, while P. S. Vinod was responsible for cinematography. Madhu and Praveen K. L. edited the Telugu and Tamil versions, respectively.

Oopiri and Thozha were released theatrically worldwide on 25 March 2016. Both films garnered critical acclaim for the performances of the lead actors, their cinematography and Vamshi Paidipally's direction in adapting the original story. The films won two awards at the 64th Filmfare Awards South: Best Director (Telugu) for Paidipally and Best Cinematography for P. S. Vinod. Additionally, Paidipally received the Best Director Award at the 6th South Indian International Movie Awards. Oopiri is regarded as one of the "25 Greatest Telugu Films of the Decade" by Film Companion.

== Plot ==
Vikramaditya is a wealthy entrepreneur whose life changes drastically after a paragliding accident in Paris leaves him a quadriplegic. Selflessly prioritizing the happiness of his girlfriend, Nandini, he abruptly severs all contact with her, hoping she will move on and find a fulfilling life with someone else.

Five years later, Vikramaditya lives a spiritless, highly routine existence in his mansion, assisted by his secretary Keerthi, his cook Lakshmi, and a team of house attendants. Seeking a new full-time caretaker to assist with his daily physical needs, Vikramaditya and Keerthi interview several candidates. While most applicants act obsequious and overly sympathetic, a completely unqualified applicant named Seenu stands out. Seenu is a street-smart convict out on parole who has only applied for the job on the advice of his lawyer, Lingam, to prove to the court that he is maintaining a law-abiding lifestyle. Outside of his legal troubles, Seenu is a disappointment to his family; his mother, a railway clerk, has disowned him to protect his younger siblings from his perceived bad influence.

Amused and refreshed by Seenu's absolute lack of pity and blunt honesty, Vikramaditya hires him, defending the unconventional choice to his long-time friend and legal advisor, Prasad. Though initially reluctant and clumsy, Seenu adapts to the demanding role, learning to dress, feed, and manage Vikramaditya's physical therapy. Along the way, Seenu openly flirts with the strict Keerthi, who constantly chides him for his irreverent attitude.

During his time at the mansion, Seenu discovers that Vikramaditya has been maintaining a purely pen-pal relationship with a woman named Priya. Seenu pushes him to take the next step and meet her in person, but a fearful Vikramaditya refuses, terrified of how she will react to his paralysis. Meanwhile, family drama strikes Seenu when his younger sister, Swathi, faces rejection from her boyfriend's family, who view her household as poor and disreputable due to Seenu's criminal record. When Swathi bitterly blames him for ruining her life, Vikramaditya steps in. Utilizing Prasad’s legal influence, Vikramaditya quietly handles the situation with the boy's father, Kaalidasu (Kaalidasan in the Tamil version), ensuring the marriage is approved. A tearful and grateful Seenu thanks Vikramaditya for restoring his family's honor.

Following a birthday celebration, Vikramaditya suffers a severe, life-threatening respiratory crisis overnight but is stabilized by his medical team. Learning more about Vikramaditya's vibrant, thrill-seeking past from Prasad, Seenu suggests a change of scenery and proposes a vacation to Paris. Vikramaditya agrees, traveling to France alongside Seenu and Keerthi. In Paris, Seenu continually boosts Vikramaditya’s morale. He even makes a playful bet: if Vikramaditya can successfully charm a beautiful French dancer named Jenny on a date, Seenu must finally ask Keerthi out. Vikramaditya wins the bet using his quick wit, and a reluctant Seenu asks out Keerthi, who happily accepts.

While in Paris, Seenu secretly tracks down Nandini. He reveals the truth about the accident and arranges a surprise reunion. Nandini is overjoyed to see Vikramaditya again and introduces him to her husband, Abhinav, and their young daughter, Aadhya, proving to him that she found the happiness he always wanted for her. Later, Seenu hitches Vikramaditya’s wheelchair to a customized motorcycle ride through the city streets, allowing the entrepreneur to feel genuinely free for the first time in five years.

Upon their return, Seenu's younger brother, Kanna, falls into dangerous trouble with a local gang and seeks shelter at the mansion. Recognizing that Seenu's family desperately needs him back home, Vikramaditya selflessly fires him, gently telling him that he shouldn't spend his entire youth pushing a wheelchair. Seenu transitions into a stable life as a cab driver, finally earning the love and respect of his mother and siblings. However, without Seenu's vibrant energy, Vikramaditya falls back into a deep, reclusive depression, refusing to take care of his health.

Deeply concerned, Prasad reaches out to Seenu for help. Seenu returns to the mansion, kidnaps a stagnant Vikramaditya, and drives him on a road trip to Visakhapatnam (Pondicherry in the Tamil version). After getting dressed in elegant suits, Seenu escorts Vikramaditya to a high-end restaurant featuring a beautiful, serene ocean view. Moments later, Seenu slips away just as Priya walks into the restaurant to meet Vikramaditya for the first time. Looking out the window, Vikramaditya spots Seenu standing by the shore, who smiles warmly at his friend before walking away into the sunset.

== Cast ==
- Akkineni Nagarjuna as Vikramaditya
- Karthi as Seenu (Note: Inaccurately credited as Sreenu in the trailer.)
- Tamannaah Bhatia as Keerthi
- Jayasudha as Seenu's mother
- Prakash Raj as Prasad
- Sreenivas Sayee as Kanna
- Nikkita Anil as Swathi
- Gabriella Demetriades as Jenny
- Kalpana as Lakshmi
- Ali as Lingam (Telugu)
- Vivek as Lingam (Tamil)
- Tanikella Bharani as Kaalidasu (Telugu) / Kaalidasan (Tamil)
- Manobala as Balavikasa (Telugu) / Balavika (Tamil) Orphanage Home warden
- Aadukalam Naren as a traffic police officer (Tamil)
- Raghu Karumanchi as the assistant traffic police officer
- Santhana Bharathi as a police officer (Tamil; deleted scene in Telugu)
- Raja Ravindra as a police officer
- Prabhas Sreenu as a prisoner (Tamil; deleted scene in Telugu)
- Satya Krishnan as a Physiotherapist
- Uma Padmanabhan as Swathi's mother-in-law
- Pujita Ponnada as Gallery Manager
- Bharath Reddy as a doctor
- Praveen as Seenu's friend
- Thagubothu Ramesh as Seenu's friend
- Black Pandi as Seenu's friend
- Ramjee as Balavikasa (Telugu) / Balavika (Tamil) Orphanage Home owner
- Ambati Srinivas as Seenu's competitor in interview
- Kadambari Kiran as Seenu's interviewer

=== Cameo appearance ===
- Shriya Saran as Priya
- Anushka Shetty as Nandini
- Adivi Sesh as Abhinav
- Nora Fatehi as Nemali (Telugu) / Nemili (Tamil) in the song "Door Number Okati / Door Number One"
- Harsha Vardhan as a traffic police officer (Telugu; uncredited)

== Production ==
=== Development ===
Karan Johar and Guneet Monga acquired the Indian remake rights to Éric Toledano and Olivier Nakache's French comedy drama film, The Intouchables (2011) in May 2014. They planned a Hindi version, directed by Mohit Suri. Johar and Monga later authorised PVP Cinema to remake the film in regional languages, postponing their previous plans. Vamshi Paidipally was chosen to direct a Telugu film titled Oopiri. Oopiri is the first Indian remake of The Intouchables. It was also the first Indian remake of a film produced by Gaumont.

N. T. Rama Rao Jr. was signed to play one of the two male leads. At Rama Rao's suggestion, Paidipally forwarded the script to actor and producer Nagarjuna for the other male lead. Nagarjuna asked the director to remove the flashback scenes, opting for a realistic version closer to the original. Paidipally agreed, and the script was reworked in two months. Production was scheduled to begin in December 2014, when Nagarjuna would be available. In an interview with Deccan Chronicle, the actor said that the film's theme would be similar to Missamma (1955). Rama Rao Jr. left the project due to scheduling conflicts with Nannaku Prematho (2016), and was replaced by Karthi in October 2014. Karthi's inclusion in the film led the makers to make the film as a bilingual titled Thozha in Tamil.

Gopi Sundar was signed as the film's music director, his first collaboration with Paidipally. Oopiri had two launch ceremonies: the first on 11 February 2015 in Hyderabad and the second on 15 March in Chennai. P. S. Vinod was the film's cinematographer. Paidipally worked on the screenplay, assisted by Hari and Solomon with the adaptation. Abburi Ravi wrote the dialogue for Oopiri, and Karthi asked filmmaker Raju Murugan to do the same for Thozha. Madhu and Praveen K. L. edited the Telugu and Tamil versions, respectively.

=== Casting ===
I couldn't use any gestures apart from speech and facial expressions. For a few scenes, they tied my hands beneath my jacket so that, involuntarily, I wouldn't move my limbs. I felt like a Bharatanatyam dancer, having to emote with my eyes.

— Nagarjuna on playing a quadriplegic, in a March 2016 interview with The Hindu

Nagarjuna played the wheelchair-using quadriplegic in the film, and a ₹25 lakh customised wheelchair was imported from Sweden for the role. An assistant checked to see if the actor moved his limbs during filming, and scenes had to be re-shot a number of times. Nagarjuna found the process "extremely challenging", and his legs sometimes became numb. Oopiri was Karthi's first Telugu film, although he was popular with Telugu-speaking audiences who saw dubbed versions of his Tamil films. Rajeev Kamineni of PVP Cinema told The Hindu that Karthi was cast to combine actors who were audience favourites and had not collaborated before.

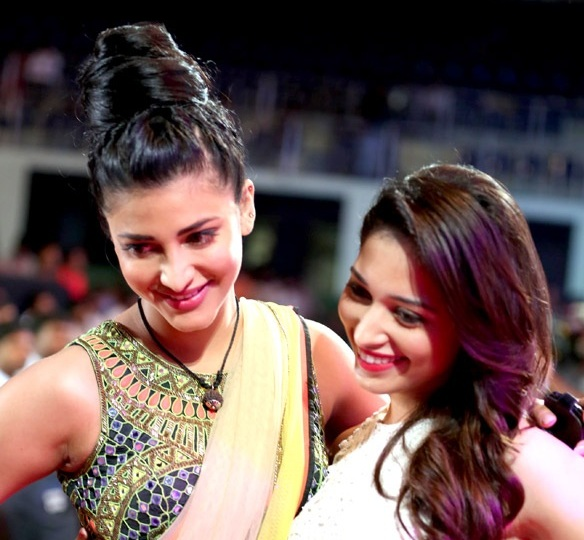
Tamannaah Bhatia (right) was cast as the female lead when Shruti Haasan (left) left the film due to scheduling conflicts.

Karthi played the caretaker, reprising Omar Sy's role in the original. He called his character "terribly insensitive", but becoming refined at the end. Despite his fluency in Telugu, Karthi wanted to practice his dialogue in advance since scenes in both languages would be shot at the same time. He had to be louder in Oopiri, and used local Tamil slang in Thozha. The actor said that some changes were made in the remake, since some situations in the original "just could not work in the Indian scenario". Shruti Haasan was chosen as the female lead in January 2015. After she walked out in March, citing scheduling conflicts, she was replaced by Tamannaah Bhatia. Her character, Keerthi, was modelled on the secretary and the caretaker in the original. The actress had to look corporate for the role, which she called a "bridge of sorts between the protagonists"; she was a "constant spectator to every emotion they go through".

After Haasan left the film, PVP Cinema claimed that her scheduled dates (from 10 December 2014 to 8 April 2015) were assigned for her convenience and the actress was civilly and criminally liable. The Nampally city court restricted her from agreeing to any new film and ordered a police investigation. According to Haasan's spokesperson, neither the actress nor Raaj Kamal Films International were legally notified. Haasan withdrew her defamation suit in April 2015 after R. Sarathkumar and Kalaipuli S. Thanu intervened, and the court dismissed PVP Cinema's case.

Prakash Raj, Ali, Vivek, and Tanikella Bharani were cast in key supporting roles, with Jayasudha and Nikkita Anil playing Karthi's mother and sister. Kalpana made her Telugu-film debut in Oopiri, but she died in her sleep at age 50 during filming in Hyderabad. Anushka Shetty and Adivi Sesh made cameo appearances as a couple; the former played Nagarjuna's ex-girlfriend in the film. Gabriella Demetriades was cast in August 2015 after auditioning with five other international models in Hyderabad, and the film was her South Indian acting debut. Nora Fatehi made a special appearance in a song, and Shriya Saran had a cameo appearance. The Telugu and Tamil versions had a slightly different supporting cast to suit the nativity of both audiences.

=== Filming ===
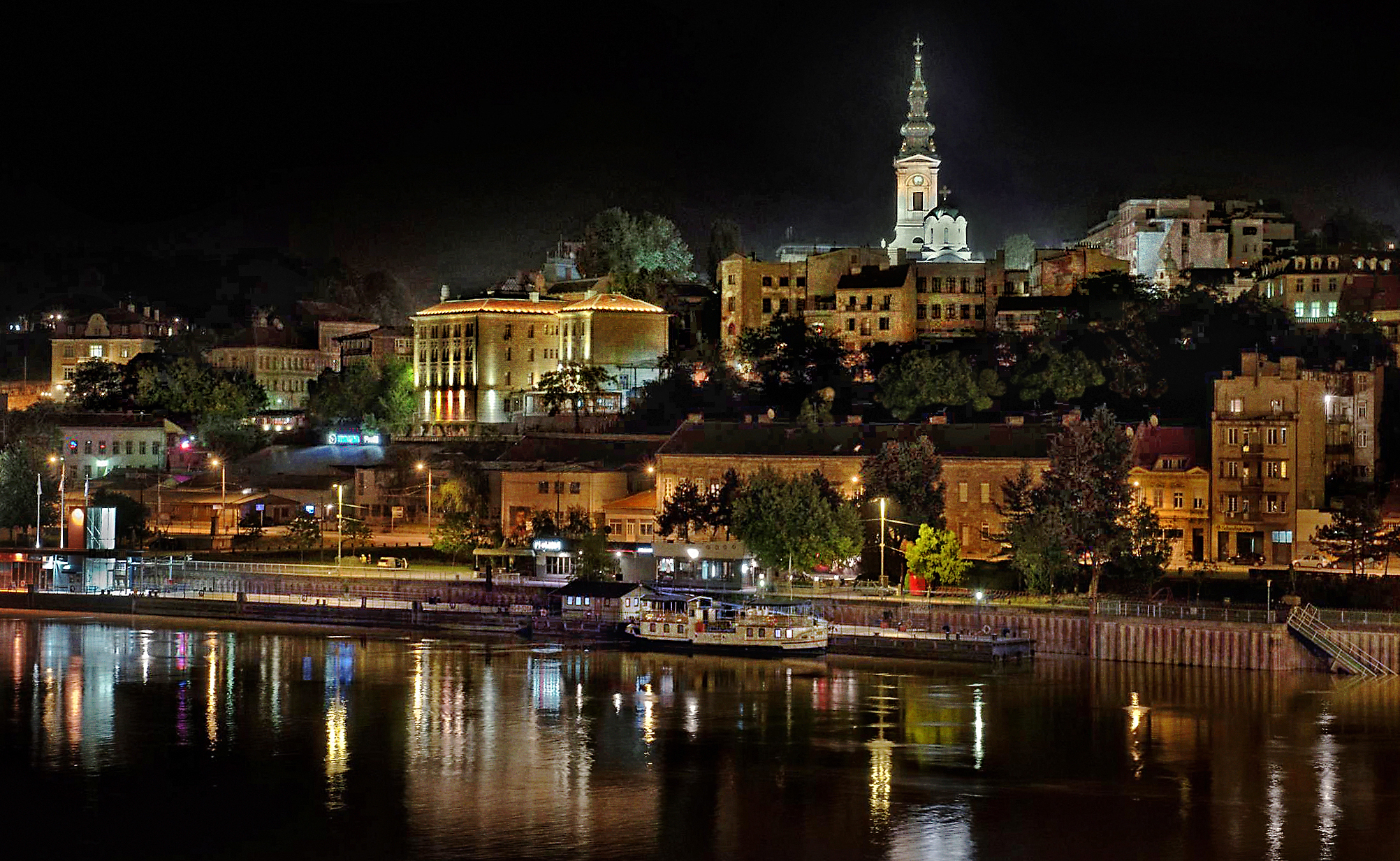
Oopiri is the first South Indian film to be made in Belgrade (pictured).

According to PVP Cinema's Kamineni, a substantial portion of Oopiri would be filmed abroad. Principal photography began in Chennai on 16 March 2015. Scenes with Karthi and Jayasudha were filmed in a purpose-built house set. By the time Haasan left the film, the first shooting schedule had wrapped. After completing schedules in Chennai and Hyderabad, Karthi and Tamannaah joined the film set in Dubai in May; several scenes were filmed in a rented, palatial house. Paidipally, who planned a 25-day shooting schedule in Paris and Lyon beginning in June, left to scout locations. A month-long European shooting schedule began in July in Belgrade and Novi Sad, and Oopiri was the first South Indian film made there. After Belgrade and Novi Sad, filming continued in Paris, Lyon and Ljubljana. Key scenes, including a car chase, and some songs were filmed as part of the schedule.

The car-chase scene was filmed over eight nights, due to changes in the weather. It was shot near the Eiffel Tower, which Paidipally called the "obvious choice to show the moment of triumph" in Vikramaditya's life. On 1 August, Nagarjuna tweeted that the shooting schedule would wrap in ten days. A song including Nagarjuna, Karthi, and Fatehi was filmed in November in Hyderabad. Principal photography wrapped in February 2016, and post-production commenced shortly. Thozha's filming was delayed due to Nagarjuna's lack of fluency in Tamil, but at Karthi's insistence he delivered his own lines. Tamannaah found her dialogue simple and realistic and delivered her own lines in Oopiri, the first Telugu film to include her voice.

== Music ==
Gopi Sundar composed the film's score and seven-song soundtrack. Ramajogayya and Sirivennela Seetharama Sastry wrote the Telugu version's lyrics, and the lyrics for Thozha's soundtrack were by Madhan Karky. According to Karky, all the lyrics in Oopiri except "Door Number Okati" had different meanings in Thozha, and Karthi and Paidipally wanted Thozha's songs to suit the Tamil audience's sensibilities. The soundtrack of the Telugu version was unveiled on 14 February 2016 (Valentine's Day) at the Hitex Convention Centre in Hyderabad, while the Tamil version was released on 21 February 2016, at St. Bede's School in Chennai amid much fanfare. Both the albums were marketed by Times Music South.

The Times of India gave Oopiri's soundtrack four stars, calling it a "winner on all counts" and Sunder is "increasingly becoming a force to be reckon with in [Telugu cinema]". Karthik Srinivasan, writing for The Hindu, praised Sunder's usage of solo violin pieces and chorus hooks in Thozha's "Pudhidhaa" ("Oka Life" in Oopiri). Siddharth K of Sify noted that the soundtrack of Thozha has influences of Malayalam film soundtracks in the slow-paced songs despite being designed keeping the Telugu and Tamil sensibilities in mind. He found the songs "Baby Odathey" ("Baby Aagodhu" in Telugu), "Nagarum" ("Eppudu" in Telugu), and "Eiffel Mele" ("Ayyo Ayyo" in Telugu) likeable and gave the soundtrack three stars.

All lyrics are written by Ramajogayya Sastry and Sirivennela Seetharama Sastry.

Oopiri
No.	Title	Singer(s)	Length
1.	"Baby Aagodhu"	Shankar Mahadevan	2:39
2.	"Oka Life"	Karthik	4:46
3.	"Ayyo Ayyo"	Ranjith, Suchitra	3:48
4.	"Nevvemicchavo"	Vijay Prakash	2:07
5.	"Podham"	Haricharan	4:45
6.	"Door Number Okati"	Geetha Madhuri	4:05
7.	"Eppudu"	Karthik	4:47
Total length:			27:36

All lyrics are written by Madhan Karky.

Thozha
No.	Title	Singer(s)	Length
1.	"Baby Odadhe"	Shankar Mahadevan	2:39
2.	"Pudidha"	Karthik	4:46
3.	"Eiffel Mele"	Ranjith, Suchitra	3:48
4.	"Enadhuyire"	Vijay Prakash	2:07
5.	"Thozha"	Anirudh Ravichander, Haricharan	4:45
6.	"Door Number One"	Geetha Madhuri	4:05
7.	"Nagarum"	Karthik	4:47
Total length:			27:36

== Release ==
=== Theatrical ===
Oopiri and Thozha were theatrically released worldwide on 25 March 2016.

=== Home media ===
The digital rights of Oopiri and Thozha were purchased by YuppTV, a leading television content provider in South. The premiere of the film took place on 3 May 2016 after its theatrical run ended. The television broadcast rights were acquired by Sun TV Network; and the global television premiere of the Tamil version Thozha was held on 2 October 2016 coinciding with Gandhi Jayanti.

== Reception ==
=== Critical response ===
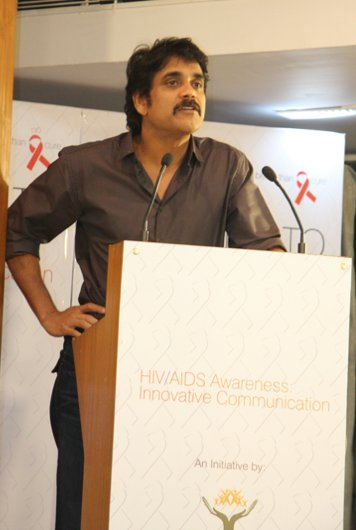
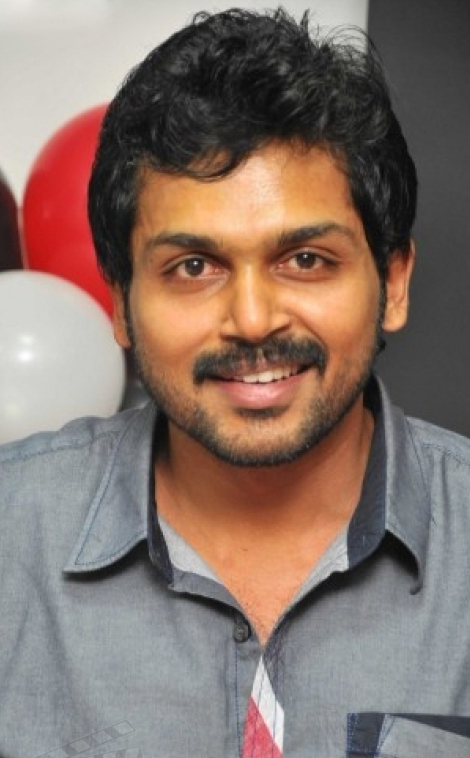
Nagarjuna (left) and Karthi (right) were critically acclaimed for their performances as a quadriplegic billionaire and his caretaker, respectively.

The films received positive critical reception.

Baradwaj Rangan, writing for The Hindu, found Thozha enjoyable despite its lack of narrative finesse and called it a light, pleasant film comparable to Bangalore Days (2014). Sangeetha Devi Dundoo, also in The Hindu, gave Oopiri four stars and called it a "rare film that justifies its hype". She wrote that Nagarjuna's portrayal of Vikramaditya was "age-defying, graceful and restrained" and praised the rest of the cast, Vinod's cinematography, and Sunder's score. Pranita Jonnalagedda of The Times of India gave Oopiri four stars out of five, writing that it "sets a benchmark for adaptations in Telugu cinema" and "paves the way for more exciting genres". She praised the principal cast's performances and the film's climax.

According to Anupama Subramaniam of Deccan Chronicle, Thozha had an "alluring story" supported by "extraordinary performances, sound technical departments and rich production values". Suresh Kavirayani, also in Deccan Chronicle, found Oopiri a "beautiful and emotional journey". Both gave the film 3.5 stars out of five. Writing for India Today, Kirubhakar Purushothaman also gave the film 3.5 stars out of five, calling it a decent remake which "retains the soul of the original" with "the right cast and the perfect team". Karthik Keramalu of News18 also gave Oopiri 3.5 stars out of five. Keramalu called it the best of Paidipally's career so far and praised the principal cast's performances.

S. Saraswathi of Rediff.com gave Thozha three stars out of five, praising the film's screenplay, visuals, and performances. Sify also gave the film three stars out of five and called it a "breezy feel good ride"; its reviewer praised its performances and visuals, but criticised its length. Gautaman Bhaskaran, writing for the Hindustan Times, gave Thozha 2.5 stars out of five; Bhaskaran found the film "[u]nduly verbose" and wrote that it "loses its sense of male bonding—particularly after it veers into love stories".

=== Box office ===
Oopiri and Thozha grossed ₹20 crore at the box office within four days, as reported by trade analyst Trinath. The film further increased its total gross to ₹27 crore in its first week and earned $1 million in the overseas market during that time, according to Firstpost.

=== Accolades ===
Date of ceremony	Award	Category	Recipient(s) and nominee(s)	Result	Ref.
28—29 March 2017	IIFA Utsavam	Best Film – Telugu	Oopiri	Nominated	
28—29 March 2017	IIFA Utsavam	Best Director – Telugu	Vamshi Paidipally	Nominated	
28—29 March 2017	IIFA Utsavam	Best Supporting Actor – Tamil	Nagarjuna	Won	
28—29 March 2017	IIFA Utsavam	Best Actor – Tamil	Karthi	Nominated	
28—29 March 2017	IIFA Utsavam	Best Supporting Actress – Telugu	Jayasudha	Nominated	
28—29 March 2017	IIFA Utsavam	Best Actor In A Comic Role – Telugu	Prakash Raj	Nominated	
28—29 March 2017	IIFA Utsavam	Best Music Director – Telugu	Gopi Sundar	Nominated	
28—29 March 2017	IIFA Utsavam	Best Lyricist – Telugu	Sirivennela Seetharama Sastry ("Podham")	Nominated	
28—29 March 2017	IIFA Utsavam	Best Male Playback Singer – Telugu	Haricharan ("Podham")	Nominated	
28—29 March 2017	IIFA Utsavam	Best Female Playback Singer – Telugu	Suchitra ("Ayyo Ayyo")	Nominated	
17 June 2017	Filmfare Awards South	Best Film – Telugu	Oopiri	Nominated	
17 June 2017	Filmfare Awards South	Best Director – Telugu	Vamshi Paidipally	Won	
17 June 2017	Filmfare Awards South	Best Cinematographer – Telugu	P. S. Vinod	Won	
17 June 2017	Filmfare Awards South	Best Actor – Telugu	Karthi	Nominated	
17 June 2017	Filmfare Awards South	Best Supporting Actor – Telugu	Nagarjuna	Nominated	
17 June 2017	Filmfare Awards South	Best Lyricist – Telugu	Sirivennela Seetharama Sastry ("Oka Life")	Nominated	
30 June — 1 July 2017	South Indian International Movie Awards	Best Director – Telugu	Vamshi Paidipally	Won	
30 June — 1 July 2017	South Indian International Movie Awards	Best Actor – Telugu	Nagarjuna	Nominated	
30 June — 1 July 2017	South Indian International Movie Awards	Best Supporting Actress – Telugu	Jayasudha	Nominated	

== Legacy ==
Inspired by the film, paraplegic television personality Sujatha Barla established the Challengers on Wheels-Celebrating Life community for physically disabled people in April 2016. Judge G. Neelima took 60 underprivileged female students in Balasadan, Warangal to a special screening of Oopiri on the eve of Ugadi. (Note: Ugadi celebrates the new year on the Deccan. It falls on a different day each year because the Hindu calendar is lunisolar.)

== See also ==
- List of multilingual Indian films
- Pan-Indian film
- List of longest films in India
