= Filmfare Award for Best Cinematographer – South =

Filmfare Award by Filmfare magazine

- Awarded for: Best work by a Cinematographer
- Country: India
- Presented by: Filmfare
- First award: 2002
- Currently held by: CH Sai for Amaran and Sunil K. S. for Aadujeevitham (2024)

Highlights
- Most wins: K. K. Senthil Kumar (4)

The Filmfare Award for Best Cinematographer is given by the Filmfare magazine as part of its annual Filmfare Awards for South Indian films.

== Winners ==
Year	Cinematographer	Film	Language	Ref.
2024	CH Sai	Amaran	Tamil
2024	Sunil K. S.	Aadujeevitham	Malayalam
2023	Sathyan Sooryan	Dasara	Telugu
2023	Ravi Varman	Ponniyin Selvan: II	Tamil
2022	K. K. Senthil Kumar	RRR	Telugu
2022	Ravi Varman	Ponniyin Selvan: I	Tamil
2020 / 21	Miroslaw Kuba Brozek	Pushpa: The Rise	Telugu
2020 / 21	Niketh Bommireddy	Soorarai Pottru	Tamil
2020 / 21	Shyju Khalid	Nayattu	Malayalam
2020 / 21	Shreesha Kuduvalli	Rathnan Prapancha	Kannada
2019	AWARDS FUNCTION WAS SUSPENDED DUE TO COVID-19 PANDEMIC
2018	R. Rathnavelu	Rangasthalam	Telugu
2017	K. K. Senthil Kumar	Baahubali 2: The Conclusion	Telugu
2016	P. S. Vinod	Oopiri	Telugu
2016	Tirru	24	Tamil
2015	K. K. Senthil Kumar	Baahubali: The Beginning	Telugu
2014	P. S. Vinod	Manam	Telugu
2013	Rajiv Menon	Kadal	Tamil
2012	Chota K. Naidu	Damarukam	Telugu
2011	R. Velraj	Aadukalam	Tamil
2010	Manoj Paramahamsa	Ye Maaya Chesave	Telugu
2010	R. Rathnavelu	Enthiran	Tamil
2009	K. K. Senthil Kumar	Magadheera	Telugu
2009	Tirru	Kanchivaram	Tamil
2008	Chota K. Naidu	Kotha Bangaru Lokam	Telugu
2008	S. Krishna	Haage Summane	Kannada
2007	K. V. Anand	Sivaji	Tamil
2006	S. Gopal Reddy	Sri Ramadasu	Telugu
2005	V. Manikandan	Anniyan	Tamil
2005	Ravi Varman	Anniyan	Tamil
2004	S. Gopal Reddy	Varsham	Telugu
2003	R. D. Rajasekhar	Kaaka Kaaka	Tamil
2002	Ravi K. Chandran	Kannathil Muthamittal	Tamil
2001	R. Rathnavelu	Nandhaa	Tamil
2000	P. C. Sreeram	Alaipayuthey	Tamil
1999	Santosh Sivan	Vanaprastham	Malayalam
1997	Santosh Sivan	Iruvar	Tamil

== Superlatives ==
Superlative	Cinematographer	Record
Most awards	K. K. Senthil Kumar	4
Most consecutive awards	Santosh Sivan	2
Most awards in a single language	K. K. Senthil Kumar	4 (Telugu)

== See also ==
- Filmfare Award for Best Cinematography
- Filmfare Award for Best Cinematographer – Marathi
