= Sathyaraj Natarajan =

- Born: Dharmapuri, Tamilnadu, India
- Other name: Sathyaraj
- Occupation: Film editor

Sathyaraj Natarajan is an Indian film editor, who has worked on Tamil language films. He was an assistant to Praveen K. L., and has often collaborated in ventures involving director Sai Gokul and won critical acclaimed films for Vidiyum Munn (2013) and Kalyana Samayal Saadham (2013).

== Career ==
Natarajan worked as an assistant to Praveen K. L. in the production of Aaranya Kaandam (2011), and edited the unreleased horror film Shivani directed by Sai Gokul. He worked simultaneously on two projects, Vidiyum Munn (2013), a thriller, and Kalyana Samayal Saadham (2013), a romantic comedy; Behindwoods.com presented him the Best Editor Award.

He continued his collaboration with Sai Gokul in Vaaliba Raja (2016) and the Anirudh musical Rum (2017). He worked on Thiagarajan Kumararaja's project, Super Deluxe (2019) starring Vijay Sethupathi and Samantha for which he won the Zee Cine Award Tamil for Best Editor. He is the editor for Andhaghaaram.

== Filmography ==
- Vidiyum Munn (2013)
- Kalyana Samayal Saadham (2013)
- Oru Modhal Oru Kadhal (2014)
- Vaaliba Raja (2016)
- Rum (2017)
- Super Deluxe (2019)
- Andava Kaanom (2020)
- Andhaghaaram (2020)
