= Ravi Varman =

Indian cinematographer, filmmaker, producer, writer

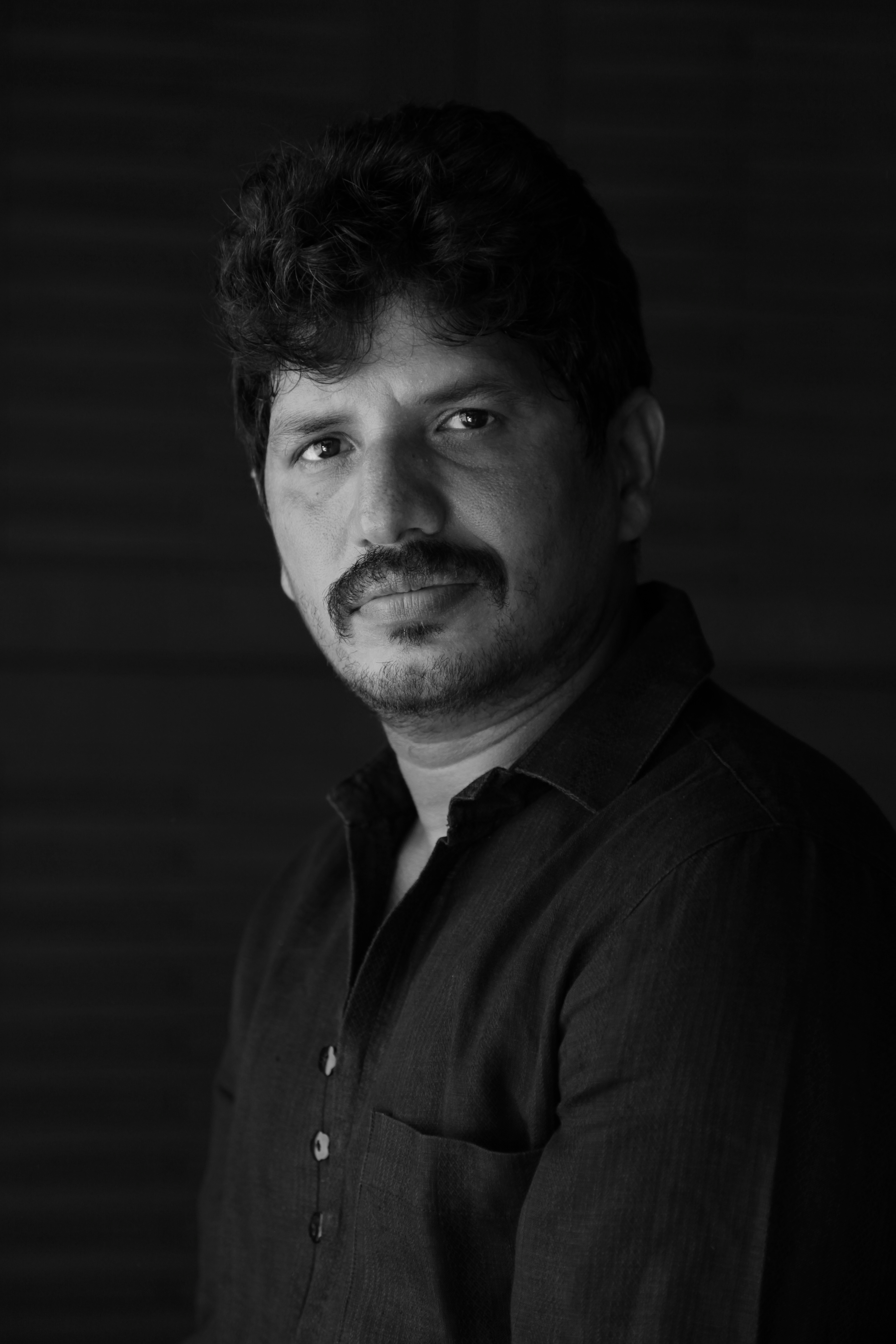
- Varman in 2011
- Born: Thanjavur, Tamil Nadu, India
- Occupations: Cinematographer; filmmaker; producer; writer
- Years active: 1999—present

S. Ravi Varman ISC is an Indian cinematographer, filmmaker, producer and writer. He predominantly works in Tamil, Malayalam, and Hindi film industries. Varman began his career in Malayalam cinema. He directed a romantic film in Tamil titled Moscowin Kavery (2010). He is an honorary member of the Academy of Motion Picture Arts and Sciences (AM-pass). He was awarded the National Film Award for Best Cinematography for his work in Ponniyin Selvan: I (2022).

== Early life ==
Ravi was born in a village named Poyyundarkudikadu near Pattukottai in Thanjavur district, Tamil Nadu, India. Ravi adopted his surname inspired by the Chola kings Arunmozhi Varman and Kulothunga Varman. His interest in photography and cinematography developed during his formative years, as he studied the works of painters like Rembrandt and Picasso.

Following the loss of his parents, he moved to Chennai at the age of 14. His career in cinematography began after working as an office boy in a film production company, where he trained under cinematographer Ravi K. Chandran.

== Career ==
He made his debut as a cinematographer with Jalamarmaram (1999) and gained attention with Jayaraj's Malayalam film Shantham (2001), earning the 23rd EMI Third Continent Award for Best Cinematography. After working in Malayalam films since 1999 for three years, he worked in Hindi cinema for the film Yeh Dil in 2003. He later worked in the Telugu film Jai and received more offers in Hindi, such as Armaan, Bee Busthar, Ramji Londonwale, and Phir Milenge.

It was not until 2002 when he started to work in Tamil films, with his first one being Susi Ganeshan's Five Star. He continued to work with directors as a cinematographer in Tamil films, including S. Shankar's Anniyan, Gautham Vasudev Menon's Vettaiyaadu Vilaiyaadu, K. S. Ravikumar's Dasavathaaram and Villu, which was directed by Prabhu Deva.

Varman has often spoken about the influence of Madras (now Chennai) on his life and career. Arriving in the city as a teenager in search of food and livelihood, he has described Madras as a place that “tested, raised, and shaped” him, comparing it to both a mother and a divine presence that guided his artistic journey.

In 2023, Varman received his first National Film Award for Best Cinematography for his work on Ponniyin Selvan: I, directed by Mani Ratnam and was featured in the FC-Ormax Power List of Technicians, recognizing his contributions to the entertainment industry alongside other prominent technicians. In 2024, Varman directed and co-produced Bande Utkala Janani Anthem, a tourism video promoting the state of Odisha. The video features music by Pritam and uses the lyrics of "Bande Utkala Janani", a patriotic anthem written by Odia poet Kantakabi Laxmikanta Mohapatra.

After completing Ponniyin Selvan, Varman worked on Revathy’s Salaam Venky and resumed post-production on Ratnam's film. Varman collaborated with Kamal Haasan once again on Indian 2, after previously working with him on Dasavathaaram (2008). The film is a sequel to Indian (1996) In 2024, Varman was invited to join the Academy of Motion Picture Arts and Sciences as part of its 2025 class of new members. He is currently working on the upcoming movie Love Insurance Kompany, directed by Vignesh Shivan.

== Awards and honours ==
- Filmfare Award for Best Cinematographer – South for Anniyan (2006)
- Tamil Nadu State Film Award for Best Cinematographer for Vettaiyaadu Vilaiyaadu (2007)
- ITFA Best Cinematographer Award for Dasavathaaram (2009)
- Star Guild Awards for Best Cinematography for Barfi! (2012)
- Screen Awards for Best cinematography for Barfi! (2012)
- IIFA Awards for Best Cinematography for Barfi! (2012)
- Zee Cine Awards for Best cinematography for Goliyon Ki Raasleela Ram-Leela (2014)
- Vijay Award for Best Cinematography for Kaatru Veliyidai (2017)
- SIIMA Award for Best Cinematography for Kaatru Veliyidai (2017)
- Filmfare Award for Best Cinematographer – South for Ponniyin Selvan: I (2023)
- Filmfare Award for Best Cinematographer – South for Ponniyin Selvan: II (2024)
- National Film Award for Best Cinematography for Ponniyin Selvan: I (2024)

== Filmography ==
=== As producer ===
- Vellaiya Irukiravan Poi Solla Maatan (2015)

=== As cinematographer ===
==== Films ====
List of Ravi Varman film credits as cinematographer
Year	Title	Language	Notes
1999	Jalamarmaram	Malayalam	
2000	Sathyam Sivam Sundaram	Malayalam	
2000	Santham	Malayalam	
2001	Valliettan	Malayalam	
2001	Vakkalathu Narayanankutty	Malayalam	
2001	Five Star	Tamil	
2003	Yeh Dil	Hindi	
2003	Jai	Telugu	
2003	Armaan	Hindi	
2003	Kilichundan Mampazham	Malayalam	
2004	Five by Four	English	
2004	Phir Milenge	Hindi	
2004	Autograph	Tamil	
2005	Anniyan	Tamil	Filmfare Award for Best Cinematographer – Tamil (Note: Jointly awarded with V. Manikandan)
2005	Ramji Londonwale	Hindi	
2006	Vettaiyaadu Vilaiyaadu	Tamil	Tamil Nadu State Film Award for Best Cinematographer
2008	Dasavathaaram	Tamil	
2009	Villu	Tamil	
2010	Moscowin Kavery	Tamil	Also directorial debut
2010	Kandahar	Malayalam	
2011	Badrinath	Telugu	
2012	Barfi!	Hindi	
2013	Goliyon Ki Raasleela Ram-Leela	Hindi	Zee Cine Awards 2014 - Best Cinematography
2015	Tamasha	Hindi	
2017	Kaatru Veliyidai	Tamil	Ananda Vikatan Cinema Awards for Best Cinematography Vijay Award for Best Cinematographer Behindwoods Gold Medal for Best Cinematographer
2017	Jagga Jasoos	Hindi	Nominated - Filmfare Award for Best Cinematography
2017	Heartbeats	English	
2018	Sanju	Hindi	
2019	Mission Mangal	Hindi	
2019	Kolaambi	Malayalam	
2022	Ponniyin Selvan: I	Tamil	Filmfare Award for Best Cinematographer – Tamil National Film Award for Best Cinematography Nominated -16th Asian Film Award for Best Cinematography
2022	Salaam Venky	Hindi	
2023	Ponniyin Selvan: II	Tamil	Filmfare Award for Best Cinematographer – Tamil
2023	Japan	Tamil	
2024	Indian 2	Tamil	
2026	Love Insurance Kompany	Tamil	

=== As guest cinematographer ===
List of Ravi Varman film credits as guest cinematographer
Year	Film	Language	Notes
1999	Vaalee	Tamil	
2001	Minnale	Tamil	2 songs
2003	Boys	Tamil	
2011	Bodyguard	Hindi	
2011	7 Aum Arivu	Tamil	"O Ringa Ringa" song
2014	Ugramm	Kannada	
2024	Crew	Hindi	1 song
