= Super Deluxe (film) =

2019 film by Thiagarajan Kumararaja

- Theatrical release poster
- Directed by: Thiagarajan Kumararaja
- Written by: Thiagarajan Kumararaja; Mysskin; Nalan Kumarasamy; Neelan K. Sekar
- Produced by: Thiagarajan Kumararaja; S. D. Ezhilmathy
- Starring: Vijay Sethupathi; Fahadh Faasil; Samantha Ruth Prabhu; Ramya Krishnan; Mysskin; Gayathrie; Ashwanth Ashokkumar; Bagavathi Perumal
- Cinematography: P. S. Vinod; Nirav Shah
- Edited by: Sathyaraj Natarajan
- Music by: Yuvan Shankar Raja
- Production companies: Tyler Durden and Kino Fist; Alchemy Vision Works; East West Dream Work Entertainment
- Distributed by: YNOTX
- Release date: 29 March 2019
- Running time: 176 minutes
- Country: India
- Language: Tamil

Super Deluxe is a 2019 Indian Tamil-language film co-written, co-produced, and directed by Thiagarajan Kumararaja, and additional screenplay written by Nalan Kumarasamy, Neelan K. Sekar and Mysskin. Produced by Tyler Durden and Kino Fist, Alchemy Vision Works, and East West Dream Work Entertainment, the film stars Vijay Sethupathi, Fahadh Faasil, Samantha Ruth Prabhu, and Ramya Krishnan. As a hyperlink film, it revolves around four groups of individuals who find themselves in the most unexpected predicaments, each poised to experience their destiny, all on one fateful day.

Super Deluxe marked the filmmaker's second directorial stint after Aaranya Kaandam (2011). Later, Kumararaja officially announced this project in November 2016 under Aneedhi Kadhaigal. The filming process went on for more than a year, despite experiencing difficulties due to demonetisation, schedule commitments of the actors and technicians, and Tamil Film Producers Council strike. The film production finally wrapped up in June 2018, followed by a lengthy post-production phase. The film's score is composed by Yuvan Shankar Raja. The cinematography was handled by P. S. Vinod and Nirav Shah, after P. C. Sreeram who initially worked on the film's first schedule, walked out of the project midway. Sathyaraj Natarajan has edited the film. The film used the themes of nostalgia, science-fiction, political incidents, and emotions, using color as an important storytelling device.

After a North American premiere on 28 March 2019, Super Deluxe was theatrically released on 29 March, distributed by YNOT X. The film received critical acclaim, praising Kumararaja's direction, storytelling, cinematography, and cast performances (particularly Vijay Sethupathi, Fahadh Faasil and Ashwanth Ashok Kumar). Many critics listed the film as one of the "Best Tamil Films of 2019", and Film Companion ranked Sethupathi and child actor Ashwanth Ashok Kumar's performances in the list of "100 Greatest Performances of the Decade". The film was screened at the Fantasia International Film Festival in North America, Bucheon International Fantastic Film Festival in South Korea, and Indian Film Festival of Melbourne, where it was conferred the "Equality in Cinema Award". The film won four Ananda Vikatan Cinema Awards, four Zee Cine Awards, four Critics Choice Film Awards, two Edison Awards, and a nomination at the 9th AACTA Awards for Best Asian Film. At the 67th National Film Awards, the film won Best Supporting Actor award for Vijay Sethupathi.

== Plot ==
The narrative unfolds through four parallel, interconnected stories taking place over a single day in Chennai.

Shilpa's Story

Jyothi and her young son, Rasukutty, eagerly await the return of Rasukutty's father, Manickam, who abandoned the family seven years prior. To their shock, Manickam returns from Mumbai having transitioned into a transgender woman named Shilpa. While Jyothi struggles with the change, Rasukutty accepts Shilpa unconditionally and insists on introducing her to his schoolmates. On their way, Berlin, a corrupt and bigoted police inspector, detains Shilpa and extorts a sexual favor from her. Shilpa faces further transphobic harassment and humiliation from the faculty and parents at Rasukutty's school.

Distraught, Shilpa secretly purchases a train ticket to return to the hijra community in Mumbai. However, she accidentally loses track of Rasukutty on the way home. Desperate, she rushes to the police station to report him missing, where she is once again confronted by Berlin. When he demands further sexual favors in exchange for his help, Shilpa fiercely rebuffs him, grapples her way out, and places a death curse on him before escaping. Returning home in despair, Shilpa finds Rasukutty safe with Jyothi. Rasukutty confronts her after finding the Mumbai train ticket in her purse. Realizing that both her son and wife genuinely love and accept her as she is, a remorseful Shilpa chooses to stay, and the family reunites.

The TV Story

Five teenagers—Gaaji, Soori, Mohan, Vasanth, and Thuyavan—skip school to watch a pornographic film at Thuyavan's house. They are horrified to discover that the actress in the video is Soori's mother, Leela. In a fit of rage and anguish, Soori smashes the television set and runs away. Terrified of his strict father discovering the broken appliance, Thuyavan enlists Gaaji and Vasanth to help him raise enough money to buy a replacement by the evening.

The boys accept a delivery job from a local gangster but bungle the assignment, losing the merchandise. They then attempt to burglarize the home of a North Indian pawnbroker, only to be confronted by a young girl possessing telekinetic and magical abilities, who reveals herself to be an extraterrestrial being. Fascinated by Gaaji, the alien creates a physical clone of him to keep as a companion, and grants the teenagers the cash required for a new television. After purchasing the replacement, the boys discard the shattered TV by tossing it through the broken roof of an abandoned building and head to a local cinema hall to watch a film.

Leela's Story

An enraged Soori runs home brandishing a screwdriver, intending to kill Leela for her past actions. However, he trips on the staircase and inadvertently stabs himself in the abdomen. Leela rushes her critically injured son to the hospital and informs her husband, Arputham. Arputham is a devout Christian convert and street preacher who survived the 2004 Indian Ocean earthquake and tsunami by clinging to a statue of Jesus Christ—an experience that birthed his intense faith, though he is currently enduring a profound spiritual crisis.

Arputham forcibly removes Soori from the hospital against medical advice, locking Leela out of his chapel to subject the boy to faith healing. Desperate, Leela secures the help of a local social counselor to override Arputham and readmit Soori to the intensive care unit, though she faces exorbitant medical bills.

It is revealed that Arputham’s crisis of faith was triggered by an earlier encounter with a frantic Shilpa, who was searching for Rasukutty. Consumed by guilt, Shilpa had confessed to Arputham that she once unknowingly trafficked two runaway children to a criminal syndicate that subsequently mutilated them for forced begging; she feared her son's disappearance was karmic retribution. Arputham harshly condemned her, stating she deserved death. Before leaving, Shilpa revealed that she too had survived the 2004 tsunami by holding onto a random rock, noting that she never attributed divinity to the object. Driven to desperation by his son's worsening condition and Shilpa's words, Arputham shatters his prized Jesus statue in frustration, only to discover a hoard of long-forgotten, smuggled diamonds hidden inside its hollow core. He uses the fortune to fund Soori's life-saving surgery. As Soori recovers and reconciles with Leela, she poses a philosophical question to Arputham: would he still worship a teddy bear if that had been the object that saved his life in the ocean? Arputham is left in silent contemplation.

Vaembu and Mugil's Story

Vaembu, trapped in an unhappy arranged marriage, invites her ex-boyfriend to her apartment while her husband, Mugil, an aspiring actor, is away. While having sex the ex-boyfriend suddenly suffers a fatal heart attack. Mugil returns home to discover the corpse. Driven by the paralyzing fear of societal stigma and the public ruin of his career over having an unfaithful wife, Mugil agrees to help Vaembu dispose of the body.

The couple encapsulates the corpse in a large canvas bag and drives out of the city, attempting to stage the death as a vehicular accident by placing the body in a car parked on an active railway track. They are caught red-handed by Inspector Berlin, who quickly deduces the crime and blackmails them. Berlin forces them back to their apartment and demands sex from Vaembu in exchange for his silence. As a terrified Vaembu undergoes the assault, the shattered television set thrown into the abandoned building by the teenagers crashes through the ceiling, striking Berlin squarely on the head and killing him instantly, fulfilling Shilpa's curse. Vaembu and Mugil successfully dispose of both bodies, their shared trauma ultimately repairing their fractured marital bond.

Epilogue

A philosophical voice-over bridges the conclusions of all four storylines, meditating on the interconnectedness, cosmic ironies, and inherent chaos of the universe. In the cinema hall, the teenagers watch the opening monologue of an adult film titled Vaazhvin Ragasiyam ("The Secret of Life"), in which an actor dressed as a doctor breaks the fourth wall, winking at the camera as he promises to reveal the ultimate mysteries of human existence.

== Cast ==
- Vijay Sethupathi as Shilpa a.k.a. Manickam, a transgender woman, Jyothi's spouse, and a parent to Rasukutty who returns home after transitioning.
- Fahadh Faasil as Mugil, an aspiring actor and Vaembu's husband who is devastated after discovering her affair, and helps her hide a dead body.
- Samantha Ruth Prabhu as Vaembu, Mugil's wife who cheats on him with her ex-boyfriend, who suddenly dies while having sex.
- Ramya Krishnan as Leela, a former actress, Soori's mother, and Arputham's wife, whose porn film "Mallu Uncut" is accidentally seen by her son.
- Gayathrie as Jyothi, Shilpa's wife and Rasukutty's mother, who is devastated to find out that her wife is transgender.
- Mysskin as Arputham a.k.a. Dhanasekaran, Leela's husband and Soori's father who is a preacher and who relies on faith healing to save his injured son.
- Bagavathi Perumal as Sub-inspector Berlin, a corrupt police officer, and the film's main antagonist who abruptly molests Shilpa and who attempts to rape Vaembu.
- Ashwanth Ashokkumar as Rasukutty, Shilpa and Jyothi's son.
- Daffe Naveen as Soori, Leela and Arputham's son who accidentally saw his mother's porn film.
- Vijay Ram as Balaji a.k.a. "Gaaji," one of Soori's friends with a carefree attitude, who later develops a crush on The Alien Girl.
- Mirnalini Ravi as The Alien Girl, who falls in love with Gaaji.
- Jayanth as Mohan, Soori's best friend.
- Abdul Jabbar as Thuyavan, Soori's friend whose TV was broken by Soori.
- Noble K. James as Vasanth a.k.a. "Mutta Puffs," one of Soori's friends, an innocent boy on whose sister Gaaji has a crush.
- Ramana as Ramasamy, Arputham's partner in his religious preaching.
- Rengarajan Rajagopalan as Kanna, Vaembu's ex-boyfriend who dies while intimate with her.
- Kavin Jay Babu as Idi Amin, a local gangster.
- Maheshwari as Mrinalini a.k.a. "Meenal," Leela's neighbour and friend.
- Manushyaputhiran as The Sexologist in "Vaazhvin Ragasiyam" porn film.
- Dhwani Shree as The Nurse in "Vaazhvin Ragasiyam".
- Porali Ramki as Kavuchi.
- Balaji Tharaneetharan as Mani, Vaembu, and Mugil's landlord.
- Harish as Sebastian Arumugam.
- Heat Bakodia as Aakash, a five-year-old boy who is Mani's relative.
- Avinash as Sunil.
- Ravi Karthick as Kishore, a jewellery store owner.

== Production ==
=== Development ===
Following the release of Aaranya Kaandam (2011), which opened to critical acclaim, the film's director Thiagarajan Kumararaja officially announced his next film after a gap of five years, in October 2016. The untitled film had Vijay Sethupathi and Fahadh Faasil (in his second Tamil project after Velaikkaran) featuring in the lead roles, with Samantha Ruth Prabhu announced as the lead actress in early November. The same month, P. C. Sreeram was announced as the cinematographer and Yuvan Shankar Raja, who worked with Kumararaja in Aaranya Kaandam, was chosen as the music director. Sathyaraj Natarajan, who worked in the same month as an assistant to Praveen K. L. was chosen as the film editor, and Vijay Adhinathan was the production designer. Kumararaja co-produced the film along with East West Dream Work Entertainment and Alchemy Vision Works. Initially, the film was titled Aneedhi Kadhaigal (Amoral tales), but following a series of schedule changes during the filming process, the new title Super Deluxe was announced.

=== Writing ===
"The story begins on a high note from the very first scene. Nobody can guess where the story is headed to. Instead of the word 'puzzle', it's more like connecting the dots".

— Thiagarajan Kumararaja, about the scripting of Super Deluxe.

In an interview with The Hindu, Kumararaja said the film does not belong to any single genre, because "One may burst into laughter while the other might be in a state of shock for the same scene." Kumararaja worked with four directors: Mysskin, Nalan Kumarasamy and Neelan K. Sekar to work on the screenplay and also unsuccessfully approached Anurag Kashyap, Dhanush and S. J. Suryah as he wanted the storyline to be "interesting". Each writer had planned different segments and different characters in the storyline, which overlap each other in the end. He said the film was not an anthology, but considered it a "fresh attempt in narrative storytelling". He preferred to write the script using the Kino Fist technique – the manipulation of narrative by jumbling up the sequence of frames through shooting and editing – by Soviet filmmaker Sergei Eisenstein. Kumararaja wrote, "One story, then another, and then I cut from one scene to the next", to bring in a non-linear narrative.

=== Characters ===
Vijay Sethupathi's character in the film was initially suspected to be transgender, which was later revealed to be true, with the character named as Shilpa. Ramya Krishnan was earlier announced as a second female lead after Samantha Ruth Prabhu and had also shot her portions for the film, but due to creative issues she walked out of the project, and Nadhiya was later brought on board. But Nadhiya also exited the project, as she was not satisfied with the script and the director re-approached Ramya Krishnan for the role, which she immediately agreed to. Krishnan played the role of Leela, a porn star in the film (within a film), Mallu Uncut, and she described her role as "most challenging ever in her career".

Mirnalini Ravi, who rose to fame with dubsmash, was roped in to play a pivotal character after she was selected by an audition. Though she did not reveal anything about her role, and her portions being set in Chennai, her role was later revealed to be an alien girl, which was the film's "surprise factor". Gayathrie was paired opposite Vijay Sethupathi, which marked their fourth collaboration after Naduvula Konjam Pakkatha Kaanom (2012), Puriyatha Puthir (2017) and Seethakaathi (2018). For her role as a married woman, she was instructed to gain weight, but she eventually fell ill during the shoot because of her uncontrolled diet. Thiagarajan later advised Gayathrie to maintain a balanced diet and the team also prepared home-cooked food for her during her shoot. Mysskin, apart from co-writing the screenplay, also played a pivotal role in the segment. His role was initially auditioned to Anurag Kashyap, but he refused the project and later expressed regrets at not being a part in the film after watching the screening of the film.

=== Filming and post-production ===
Filming of the first schedule began in October 2016, but it was immediately halted after 15 days of shoot due to demonetization implemented by Prime Minister Narendra Modi and the actors' commitments in other projects. In July 2017, it was announced that P. C. Sreeram had opted out of the project, as his schedule was being conflicted with Pad Man (2018). As a result, P. S. Vinod, who had worked with Kumararaja in Aaranya Kaandam, was roped in to replace Sreeram and Nirav Shah handled additional cinematography. Vijay Sethupathi, who had completed the first schedule of Junga, started shooting for his portions in the same month and completed it by October. Mysskin's segment began filming in January 2018, and was completed before March 2018. Following the Tamil Film Producers Council strike, which ended in April, the makers resumed shooting for the last segment of the film featuring Fahadh Faasil, and the shooting was completed in its entirety after the segment's completion in June 2018, and post-production subsequently began.

Thiagarajan and Mysskin revealed in an interview that there are several sequences in the film that involved 100–150 takes. For a scene featuring Ramya Krishnan, the team took 37 takes, which spanned two days. The team planned to shoot the film in film camera, but the lack of negative films prompted the team to use digital camera. As per Kumararaja's request, the locations had "shapes and textures and a sense of age and limitations in terms of lighting" to give a depth to the images. The shots were entirely filmed indoors, and for a few sequences, exterior shots were used. Kumararaja also had used saturated color gradings instead of vibrant colors to reflect the film's theme. He gave an example about Mysskin's segment, which had a marine feel to resemble the track being connected with the 2004 Indian Ocean earthquake and tsunami.

== Soundtrack ==
Yuvan Shankar Raja composed the soundtrack for Super Deluxe in his second collaboration with Kumararaja after Aaranya Kaandam (2010). Unlike the previous film, which had no songs, Kumararaja planned a soundtrack album having a mix of retro style, jazz, and contemporary classical music. But they decided against doing so, and it eventually became Raja's third film without a soundtrack after Adhu and Aaranya Kaandam. Instead, the team used yesteryear compositions of Ilaiyaraaja, being licensed for the film. A promotional song titled "Ding Dong" was composed, which was included in a promo teaser. Yuvan scored the music for the film's background, which was critically acclaimed. After being praised for his work in the film, fans insisted to release the film score as a separate album. Later, the original soundtrack was released on 27 May 2020.

== Marketing and release ==
Thiagarajan Kumararaja had initially planned to premiere the film at the 71st Cannes Film Festival during May 2018, which could not happen due to production delays. In February 2019, it was revealed that YNOT X, the distribution arm of YNOT Studios, had acquired the film rights. The official theatrical trailer was released on YouTube on 22 February 2019, which had Vijay Sethupathi narrating the entire segments of the storyline through the trailer. Hindustan Times and The Indian Express reviewed the trailer as "highly intriguing". The film's publicity designer, Gopi Prasannaa, created a graffiti tribute for the film, which was considered to be his first professional artwork.

Super Deluxe received an A (adults only) certificate from the censor board without any cuts, unlike Aaranya Kaandam, which had 52 cuts. It also had a speculated runtime of 176 minutes. The film was screened in more than 800 theaters across Tamil Nadu on 29 March 2019. A special premiere was held at the United States on 28 March in 85 locations distributed by Prime Media. Despite being an adult-rated film, the film was watched by family audiences owing to the fanbase of Vijay Sethupathi across rural and urban audiences.Super Deluxe was screened and was conferred the "Equality in Cinema Award" at the 2019 Indian Film Festival of Melbourne. It was also screened at the Fantasia International Film Festival, the largest genre film festival in North America and the Bucheon International Fantastic Film Festival. After its theatrical premiere, the film was made available for streaming on Netflix. It was dubbed in Telugu under the same title and released directly through the streaming service Aha on 30 July 2021.

== Reception ==
=== Critical reception ===
==== India ====
Super Deluxe received critical acclaim. On the review aggregator website Rotten Tomatoes, 83% of 6 critics' reviews are positive, with an average rating of 8.3/10.

Baradwaj Rangan in his review for Film Companion South, praised the director on how he had concentrated on both the larger structure of the story and also on the minute details. He stated, "This is an utterly unique film," and went on to say, "All of this would be little more than postmodern pranks if not for the film's magnificent design. This is not the first film to tell the story of three couples, but where earlier directors treated these stories like intimate domestic drama, Super Deluxe makes them something almost infinite, spanning the breadth of human (and other) existence". Writing for The Hindu, Srivatsan S. called the film as a spiritual successor to Aaranya Kaandam and said, "No other filmmaker has probably romanticized the Tamil cinema universe with pop culture references as much as Kumararaja [...] If Super Deluxe is what you get from a filmmaker who was in exile, then you don't mind waiting a few years from now till he comes up with his next eccentric film". M Suganth, in his review for The Times of India, gave 4 (out of 5) stars and wrote, "There is black comedy, double entendres, swear words, WTF moments, political and social commentary, romance, sentiment and even a musing on what it means to be life on Earth. There is ambition, genius, and also a beating heart".

Kirubakaran Purushothaman of India Today gave 4 1/2 stars (out of 5) and said, "Thiagarajan Kumararaja crafts a path-breaking film that deserves more than one watch to understand the depth in each characterisations". Hindustan Times-based critic Karthik Kumar gave a 5/5 rating and said, "Super Deluxe is built on the premise of morality. It questions what is right and what's wrong and in the process, makes us understand that what's right for someone need not necessarily be wrong for others". He called the performances as "top notch" and considered the film as "Tamil cinema's most eccentric and boldest attempts in recent years". Sowmya Rajendran of The News Minute too gave the same rating and said, "Super Deluxe, like Aaranya Kaandam, will open new doors of possibility for Tamil cinema. It may well be that the industry, which is already seeing quite a bit of successful experimentation, is stepping into the Deluxe age". Calling it as "one of the best Tamil film in recent times", Sreedhar Pillai, in his review for Firstpost, assigned a score 4 (out of 5), saying, "Thiagarajan Kumararaja delivers a film of substance which also entertains". Writing for The Indian Express, S. Subakeerthana rated the film 4 stars (out of 5) and called it an "intellectually stimulating experience". He went on to say, "It's hard to categorize this film, which has got everything — wholesome entertainment, humor, noir, and a bit of sci-fi. Super Deluxe, undoubtedly, is one step higher than Aaranya Kaandam — in terms of treatment, writing, and presentation".

Suparna Sharma of Deccan Chronicle wrote, "Super Deluxe presents, then lovingly creates and frames the most masculine of archetypes on one side, and on the other are women, seeming rendered powerless by morality, gender, sexuality, and virtue. And then, slowly, it shows what they all are really made of". She gave the film 4 out of 5 stars. Udhay Bhatia of Mint said, "Super Deluxe is too pleasurable and fluent from minute to minute, scene to scene to get hung up on the stuff that doesn't work". A critic from Indiaglitz gave the film 3.75 (out of 5) and said, "Super Deluxe is an unforgettable, not to be missed top-notch cinematic experience that deserves to be celebrated". Sify gave a review: "Super Deluxe benefits enormously from winning performances by its lead actors". Behindwoods gave 3 1/2 (out of 5) and said, "Thiagarajan Kumararaja proves that he knows the medium of cinema quite well. He beautifully narrates four stories, each dealing with concepts like sexual abuse, porn film industry, bullying, marriage, abuse of power, religion, nationalism, and finally what life is. All these are conveyed with loads of humour, and the film also reinforces the fact that you don't need to constantly feed the audience with one-liners to evoke laughter". In contrast Gauthaman Bhaskaran of News18, gave a mixed review, saying, "Super Deluxe could have been far more exciting had it been pruned by at least 45 minutes". He further praised Vijay Sethupathi's performance, giving the film 2 1/2 stars (out of 5).

==== Overseas ====
Rachel Saltz of The New York Times said, "Kumararaja's work is stylish and wry, with an indie-cinephile sensibility. Part of that sensibility is a frankness about sex that's still unusual in Indian movies, especially commercial ones. Though nothing explicit is shown, all the story lines in Super Deluxe have a little sexual motor, and there's plenty of frank, off-color language, too". Ranjani Krishnakumar of Huffington Post said, "Super Deluxe is a delicately intelligent commentary on modern life with such powerful writing and artful filmmaking". However, she added, "The biggest strength of Super Deluxe, is the characters. Despite the many interesting characters (and excellent actors) that share screen space, we understand and empathise with them[...] Kumararaja packs so much into so little time that we walk away feeling like we know these people, even if we don't really like all of them". Joe Leydon of Variety Magazine said, "Thiagarajan Kumararaja's unstable mix of dark comedy, brutal thriller and Douglas Sirk-ian melodrama is shamelessly excessive but undeniably entertaining". He further wrote, "There can be no denying that Super Deluxe has more than its share of draggy sections where the passage of time and the escalation of humiliation make themselves uncomfortably felt. Ultimately, however, the sheer chutzpah of the film, and the dedicatedly in-sync performance by the cast, are enough to keep audiences appreciatively absorbed". Sarath Ramesh Kuniyl of The Week said, "Super Deluxe makes you question what man often takes for granted. Be it sexuality, God or relationships. And it doesn't provide you the answers on a platter. It is for you to find out". He further called the film as a "comeback of epic proportions for the gifted filmmaker". Critics Thomas McNulty and Merrick Sinclair of Hollywood Insider said, "Super Deluxe is a masterfully put together web of storylines. Each plot is unique and interesting in its own way, so the audience is never bored. With expert acting, beautiful cinematography, and a non-stop story, Super Deluxe transcends language barriers and is enjoyable by all audiences".

=== Accolades ===
Super Deluxe won four awards at the Ananda Vikatan Cinema Awards – Best Screenplay, Best Supporting Actress (Ramya Krishnan), Best Cinematography (P. S. Vinod and Nirav Shah) and Best Music Director (Yuvan Shankar Raja). The film received four nominations at the inaugural ceremony of Zee Cine Awards Tamil: Best Supporting Actor – Female (Krishnan), Best Child Artist (Ashwanth Ashokkumar), Best Editor (Sathyaraj Natarajan) and Best Art Director (Vijay Adhinathan), and won all of them, including a Jury Special award for Best Actor – Female (Samantha Ruth Prabhu). The film won five Critics Choice Film Awards: Best Movie of the Year, Best Film, Best Director, Best Actor, Best Writing, and two Edison Awards. At the Indian Film Festival of Melbourne held on 8 August 2019, the film was nominated at four categories and won two – Best Actor (Vijay Sethupathi) and an Equality in Cinema (Honorary Award). It received a nomination at the 9th AACTA Awards for Best Asian Film. At the 67th National Film Awards, held for Indian films released in 2019, the film received an award for Best Supporting Actor for Vijay Sethupathi.

=== Film charts ===
Super Deluxe was listed at many critics' top ten lists. In addition, Film Companion ranked Vijay Sethupathi and child actor Ashwanth Ashokkumar's performances in the list of "100 Greatest Performances of the Decade".

- 2nd – S. Subakeerthana, The Indian Express
- 2nd – Haricharan Pudipeddi, Hindustan Times
- 3rd – Siddharth K., Sify
- 4th – Janani K., India Today
- 5th – Surendhar M. K., Firstpost
- 6th – Rohan Naahar, Hindustan Times
- 6th – Baradwaj Rangan, Film Companion South
- 7th – Anna M. M. Vetticad, Firstpost
- 7th – Sayantan Mondal, The Quint

== Legacy ==
The film's poster, designed by Gopi Prasannaa, was listed in Posterphilia: Top 10 Indian Movie Posters of the Decade by Film Companion. Moviecrow too listed the poster in Best Tamil Movie Posters (2019) and reviewed: "The synchronicity of Super Deluxe's events is captured in this poster and interestingly it turned out to be an exact representation of all things that appear in the film. There's a sense of striking appeal to the embossed nature of the poster."
