= P. S. Vinod =

Indian cinematographer

- Education: Madras Film Institute
- Occupation: Cinematographer

P. S. Vinod is Indian cinematographer who works in Telugu, Hindi, and Tamil films. His notable works include Aaranya Kaandam (2010), Panjaa (2011), Manam (2014), Oopiri (2015), Dhruva (2016), Vikram Vedha (2017), Super Deluxe (2019), Ala Vaikuntapuramulo (2020), and Sita Ramam (2022). Vinod received the Filmfare Award for Best Cinematographer – South for his work on Manam and Oopiri.

== Career ==
He did the majority of the apex commercials in India. He graduated from the Film and Television Institute of Tamil Nadu, now called the MGR Film Institute. After he graduated from the institute, he assisted veteran cinematographer Santosh Sivan. He was then signed by director Vasanth for two of his successive Tamil films, Appu and Rhythm. Subsequently, he did a few well known films in Bollywood. His second Hindi film Musafir got him a Zee Film Awards nomination. His work in Striker (2010) was praised by critics.

He was chosen by choreographer-turned-director Farah Khan to film her third directorial Tees Maar Khan. Vinod's work in the film was lauded by critics, with the film being selected by Rediff as one of the most good looking Bollywood films of 2010. He has worked on two Tamil films, the gangster film Aaranya Kaandam that won The Grand Jury Award for Best Film at South Asian International Film Festival, and the romantic comedy Kadhal 2 Kalyanam. He won the Vijay Award for Best Cinematographer for the former. The latter that marks actor Arya's brother Sathya's debut has been severely delayed and slated to release in 2012.

== Filmography ==
Year	Title	Language	Notes
2000	Appu	Tamil	
2000	Rhythm	Tamil	
2001	Pyaar Ishq Aur Mohabbat	Hindi	
2004	Musafir	Hindi	
2005	Neal 'n' Nikki	Hindi	
2005	My Wife's Murder	Hindi	
2009	What If...	English	
2010	Striker	Hindi	
2010	Tees Maar Khan	Hindi	
2010	Aaranya Kaandam	Tamil	
2011	Panjaa	Telugu	
2013	David	Hindi	
2013	Bullett Raja	Hindi	
2014	Manam	Telugu	Filmfare Award for Best Cinematographer – South; Nominated–SIIMA Award for Best Cinematographer – Telugu
2016	Soggade Chinni Nayana	Telugu	
2016	Oopiri / Thozha	Telugu / Tamil	Bilingual film; Filmfare Award for Best Cinematographer – South
2016	Dhruva	Telugu	
2017	Vikram Vedha	Tamil	
2017	Hello	Telugu	
2018	Aravinda Sametha Veera Raghava	Telugu	
2019	Super Deluxe	Tamil	Ananda Vikatan Cinema Award for Best Cinematographer
2020	Ala Vaikunthapurramuloo	Telugu	
2021	Vakeel Saab	Telugu	
2022	Attack	Hindi	
2022	Sita Ramam	Telugu	Nominated–SIIMA Award for Best Cinematographer – Telugu
2022	Vikram Vedha	Hindi	Nominated-Filmfare Award for Best Cinematography
2024	Guntur Kaaram	Telugu	Shot about 50% of the film
2027	Varanasi †	Telugu	
