= Oram Po =

2007 Tamil Indian film

- Poster
- Directed by: Pushkar–Gayathri
- Written by: Thiagarajan Kumararaja (Dialogue)
- Screenplay by: Pushkar–Gayathri
- Story by: Pushkar–Gayathri
- Produced by: A.P. Film Garden
- Starring: Arya; Pooja; Lal; John Vijay
- Cinematography: Nirav Shah
- Edited by: Anthony
- Music by: G. V. Prakash Kumar
- Distributed by: A P Film Garden
- Release date: 30 November 2007
- Running time: 120 minutes
- Country: India
- Language: Tamil

Oram Po (transl. Move Aside) is a 2007 Indian Tamil-language black comedy film starring Arya and Pooja, while Lal and John Vijay play supporting roles. The film, written and directed by the debutant husband-wife duo, Pushkar–Gayatri, was produced by V. Palanivel and A. C. Anandan for A.P. Film Garden. G. V. Prakash Kumar was the music director, Nirav Shah was the cinematographer, and Anthony handled the editing. The film, revolving around auto rickshaw racing, was released after almost a year of production on 30 November 2007.

== Plot ==
Chandru and Bigilu are close friends. Chandru is an expert auto driver and racer, while Bigilu is a mechanic expert at customising autos to run at the dream speed of 130 km/h. Pichchai aka Son of Gun is the chief of a rival group who wants to outsmart the duo. Chandru, the race champ, tries to settle the dues for his auto through a race, which is almost a cake walk for him. He and Bigilu challenge Son of Gun to a race, and a date is fixed. Bigilu, meanwhile, introduces Chandru to his sister, who runs a biriyani shop. Chandru is attracted to her daughter Rani and woos her. The affair grows stronger, and the couple have sex. However, Chandru, is not interested in long-term commitment and tells Rani so. Shocked, Rani curses at him and moves away. On the D-day, Chandru is distracted by the memories of his love affair and loses the race and his auto. Later, Bigilu learns of the affair. The subplot of a smuggler's search for missing pearls adds flavour to the proceedings. The unpredictable and fun-filled climax puts everything in order.

== Cast ==
- Arya as Chandru
- Lal as Bigil
- Pooja as Rani
- John Vijay as Pichchai (son of Gun)
- Rudra as Bigil's wife
- Jagan as Supply
- Thambi Ramaiah
- Nellai Siva as Annachi

== Production ==
The film was earlier titled Auto. When directors Pushkar and Gayathri were travelling in an auto rickshaw they met an auto driver and received information about them. For the role of an auto driver Arya observed many auto-drivers. Pooja was selected to play a village girl who sells Biriyani, pairing with Arya for the second time after Ullam Ketkumae. Debutant John Vijay was selected to play a negative character called "Son of Gun". Arya performed the most risky shots without a dupe.

== Soundtrack ==
The soundtrack was composed by G. V. Prakash Kumar. The song "Idhu Enna Mayam" marks the Tamil debut of Bollywood playback singer Alka Yagnik.

| Song title | Singers | Lyrics |
|---|---|---|
| "Gun Ganapathi" | T. Rajendar, Shankar Mahadevan | Na. Muthukumar |
| "Idhu Enna Mayam" | Alka Yagnik, Shankar Mahadevan | Na. Muthukumar |
| "Kozhi Kaalu" | Jassie Gift, Kailash Kher | Na. Muthukumar |
| "Jigu Jickan" | Manicka Vinayakam | Na. Muthukumar |
| "Yaar Iraivanai" | Sunitha Sarathy, George Peter | Na. Muthukumar |
| "Oram Po" Theme | Blaaze | Thiagarajan Kumararaja |

== Reception ==
The Hindu wrote, "The strongest points of the movie are some excellent dialogues by Thyagaraja Kumararaja —they’re genuinely funny and spontaneous, even when the characters are talking dirty— and the high-energy background score"and also praised the performances of the actors Arya, Pooja and John Vijay. Rediff wrote:" film may have failed in authentically portraying the difficult street life in Chennai, but succeeds, at least most of the time, as an entertainer". Sify wrote, "Debutant director duo Pushkar and Gayathri, the husband and wife team starts their Oram Po on a promising note, but somewhere along the way it runs out of gas". Chennai Online wrote "One can appreciate the debutant director duo of Pushkar and wife Gayatri attempting to break away from the routine format and trying a different approach. But there is not much that involves a viewer here".

== Box office ==
The film was a decent success at the box office.
