= Aaranya Kaandam =

2010 film by Thiagarajan Kumararaja

- Theatrical poster
- Directed by: Thiagarajan Kumararaja
- Written by: Thiagarajan Kumararaja
- Produced by: S. P. B. Charan
- Starring: Jackie Shroff; Ravi Krishna; Sampath Raj; Yasmin Ponnappa; Guru Somasundaram
- Cinematography: P. S. Vinod
- Edited by: Praveen K. L. N. B. Srikanth
- Music by: Yuvan Shankar Raja
- Production company: Capital Film Works
- Distributed by: X
- Release dates: 30 October 2010 (SAIFF); 10 June 2011 (India)
- Running time: 116 minutes(censored); 126 minutes (uncut)
- Country: India
- Language: Tamil
- Budget: ₹ 5.25 crore

Aaranya Kaandam (transl. The Book of Jungle); English title: Anima and Persona) is a 2011 Indian Tamil-language black comedy crime film written and directed by Thiagarajan Kumararaja in his directorial debut. It is supposedly the first neo-noir film in Tamil cinema. The plot takes place in a day in the lives of the six protagonists, played by Jackie Shroff, Ravi Krishna, Sampath Raj and debutants Yasmin Ponnappa, Guru Somasundaram and Master Vasanth. Produced by S. P. B. Charan's Capital Film Works, the musical score was composed by Yuvan Shankar Raja, cinematography by P. S. Vinod and editing handled by the duo Praveen K. L.-N. B. Srikanth.

The film was launched on 18 December 2008, with its principal photography being completed by late 2009, which was followed by a lengthy post-production phase. It ran into difficulties as the regional censor board in Chennai raised objection against the film, giving it an adult rating besides demanding 52 cuts. After screening and becoming approved by the Tribunal in Delhi, the film was released worldwide on 10 June 2011, where it received critical acclaim from critics, but underperformed at box-office. Despite its failure, it gained recognition over the years, and is now regarded as a cult film in Tamil and Indian cinema.

Aaranya Kaandam had its world premiere on 30 October 2010 at the South Asian International Film Festival, where it won the Grand Jury Award for Best Film. Subsequently, the film was honoured with two National Film Awards for Best Editing and Best First Film of a Director category respectively.

== Plot ==
Singaperumal is an aged gangster, who forces himself on a girl named Subbu, but is unable to perform and vents his frustration by slapping her. Later, his right-hand man Pasupathy tells him that a large stash of cocaine worth ₹20,000,000 (US$210,000), has entered the city. The man bringing the stash wants to sell it for ₹5,000,000 (US$52,000). Pasupathy sees the profit, the long-term benefit (to control the cocaine market with such an ample supply), and the recognition if they are able to pull off such a deal. The drawback is that the stash belongs to their arch-rival Gajendran.

Singaperumal knows that Gajendran is a vicious and unpredictable adversary and that the venture is risky, so he decides to pass. Pasupathy suggests that Singaperumal is getting old and asks him to loan him ₹5,000,000 (US$52,000) so he can do the job himself. Pasupathy is prepared to face the risks, and in return for the loan, he offers Singaperumal a cut of the profits. Singaperumal agrees to the loan but instead asks Pasupathy to first get the stash and then think of the profit distribution.

Kaalayan is a destitute farmer, living with his young, street-smart son Kodukapuli in the slums and earns a meagre living staging cockfights; coincidentally, Singaperumal loves to watch these cockfights. One evening, a man arrives in a bunk with Kaalayan for the night. The man is actually the cocaine courier, who routinely transports various stashes of drugs in and out of the city and collects a relatively small fee ₹10,000 (US$100) for each trip. That evening, after a long bout of drinking, he reveals that he has learnt the actual value of the stash and now intends to sell it himself. Seeing Subbu in tears, Singaperumal asks one of his men Sappai to take her out and comfort her, 'so she is prepared to perform for him at night'.

Sappai takes her to the beach and tries to console her. Pasupathy and the men meet with the tipster and drive off to retrieve the stash. En route in the car, one of the men receives a call from Singaperumal, who orders him to bump off Pasupathy as soon as the stash is acquired. Pasupathy overhears this and gets into a Mexican stand-off with others. In a desperate ploy, he deliberately provokes a cop at a checkpoint, getting arrested and then later making an escape. The men kidnap his wife Kasthuri and use her as bait to lure Pasupathy. Singaperumal orders them to bring Kasthuri to him.

Meanwhile, Subbu hates being a plaything for Singaperumal and wants to live life on her own terms. She tries to persuade Sappai to think for himself and realise that Singaperumal is using them. Sappai, however, is too fearful and weak to oppose Singaperumal. Subbu and Sappai become unlikely friends, and Subbu continues to hope for a way out. Subbu is somewhat educated and learns whatever she can about the world outside Singaperumal.

Meanwhile, Kaalayan stages his cockfight the following day, but this time, his prize rooster gets killed. He is now in serious financial trouble. Kodukapuli senses this and immediately goes to see if their visitor, still unconscious, has any money. They find out that the man had alcohol poisoning and died. Kaalayan and Kodukapuli find the cocaine stash and the phone number of a prospective buyer (Singaperumal and Pasupathy). On the other hand, Singaperumal is worried as his stash has not arrived, nor has he got word that Pasupathy is dead. He gets an angry call from Gajapathy (Gajendran's brother and right-hand man): if Pasupathy seizes Gajapathy's stuff, Gajendran will unleash a gang war.

The cunning Singaperumal tells Gajapathy that Pasupathy has gone rogue and Gajapathy is free to take out Pasupathy. Singaperumal figures this will benefit him in two ways: he will get the stash, and Pasupathy will be killed by Gajendran. Gajendran sends his thugs after Pasupathy, who is on the run. Now that Singaperumal has become his enemy, Pasupathy figures that Gajendran could possibly become an ally. Kaalayan calls Singaperumal to meet and make a deal for the stash. While waiting for him, Singaperumal's thugs arrive and kidnap Kaalayan. After continuous torture, Kaalayan is unable to reveal anything as Kodukapuli has the stash. Kodukapuli ends up accidentally calling Pasupathy's number and offers to trade the stash for his father.

Pasupathy joins Kodukapuli and offers the same deal to Singaperumal: the stash in return for Kaalayan and Kasthuri. Pasupathi places a call to Gajendran and offers to reveal the location of the stash. Gajendran and his gang arrive at the location to make the exchange with Pasupathy. Singaperumal's thugs also arrive. Pasupathy pretends to offer the stash to Gajapathy, but instead slits his throat right in front of Gajendran. An enraged Gajendran and his gang chase Pasupathy. Pasupathy leads them around the block where Singaperumal's gang lie waiting. Both gangs, mistaking Pasupathy's loyalties, charge at each other and start a gang war.

Pasupathy gets out of the fray and watches as Singaperumal's key generals and Gajendran hack each other to bits. Pasupathy's plan to decimate the two strong factions has succeeded, and he returns to finish off Singaperumal. Back in his room, Singaperumal discovers that the bag with the loan money is missing. He rushes to the conclusion that Sappai took it. When Sappai returns (having been sent by Subbu to fetch fruits), Singaperumal beats him up severely. After being beaten up, Sappai shoots Singaperumal dead. All of a sudden, Subbu emerges from the shadows, and is proud of Sappai, but she shoots him dead. When Pasupathy arrives, he finds the two men dead and Subbu in tears.

Having always been sympathetic to Subbu's suffering with Singaperumal, he says she is free to go. Pasupathy assumes command of the remaining thugs of Singaperumal's gang, and his wife Kasthuri is also unharmed. He later gets the stash and pays Kodukapuli a fair commission. It is finally revealed that Subbu had planned the entire chain of events. She sent Sappai with the money bag to provoke Singaperumal's temper. She retrieves the bag and quietly leaves the city to begin a new life. She remarks that the men basically mistrusted, misused, and slaughtered each other. In her view, Sappai too was not really an innocent victim. She says that Sappai is also a man, but all men are sappai (the word 'sappai' has varied meanings, but in this context, it means insignificant to the point of being contemptuous). The film ends with her line: 'The best thing about being a woman is that it is a man's world'.

== Cast ==
- Jackie Shroff as Singaperumal/Ayya
- Ravi Krishna as Sappai
- Sampath Raj as Pasupathy
- Yasmin Ponnappa as Subbalakshmi aka Subbu
- Guru Somasundaram as Kaalayan
- Master Vasanth as Kodukkapuli
- Boxer Arumugam as Gajendran
- Sai Dheena as Gajapathy
- Ajay Raj as Chittu
- Jayashree as Kasthuri
- Shakul Master as Magilvaganam
- Sugunthan as Mullu
- Alex as Nagaraj
- Ramesh as Mottai
- Dinesh Subbarayan as Robin
- K. Karthikeyan as Shop Owner
- Pudhupettai Suresh as Drug Dealer
- Five Star Krishna as Astrologer

== Production ==
=== Development ===
In August 2007, following the success of his film Chennai 600028 (2007), speculation over S. P. B. Charan's next production venture arose. While initial reports suggested that he would produce Achchamundu! Achchamundu!, starring Sneha and Prasanna, Charan opted to produce a film titled Aaranya Kaandam, to be directed by a newcomer Thiagarajan Kumararaja and starring newcomers. However, despite announcing the project, it was called off later that year and Charan started producing the film Kunguma Poovum Konjum Puravum in May 2008.

In late 2008, while Kunguma Poovum Konjum Puravum was in post-production stage, reports surfaced that Charan and Kumararaja were going to revive the project, with noted Bollywood actor Jackie Shroff being roped in for a leading role, making his debut in Tamil cinema. Director Thiagarajan Kumararaja was revealed to be a former Loyola College student, and popular advertisement film-maker, who has also directed several short films, including the short film Becky, which was awarded the first prize at the one-minute film competition 60 Seconds to Fame. Kumararaja had previously written the dialogues for the 2007 comedy film Oram Po as well. He got the opportunity to work with Charan, when Pushkar-Gayathri, the director duo of Oram Po, had suggested him to approach Charan, who listened to the storyline and immediately agreed to produce the film, "in a matter of time" as Kumararaja cites. The film was formally launched on 18 December 2008 at the Kodandapani Studios in Chennai.

=== Writing ===
The script was written by Thiagarajan Kumararaja himself, which he had finished in 2006. He cites that he wanted to make a "racy film" and wrote the climax part first, which would be the "raciest part of a film". He then wrote "multiple storylines with three climaxes" as he felt that one climax was "not enough for a feature film", which eventually turned out to be a "leisurely paced film, taking its own time to unfold" and not a racy film as intended. He cited that, while writing the script, he was sure that it was meant for a matured audience and not for children, "primarily because of the content".Thiagarajan Kumararaja went on to add that there were "no hero and no villain introduction scenes, there are no love scenes, no sentimental scenes" but nonetheless considered his film a masala film and not an experimental film.

=== Casting ===
When announcing the film had already roped in Jackie Shroff, debuting in the Tamil film industry, Ravi Krishna, Sampath Raj of Saroja fame along with Guru Somasundaram from the Chennai based theatre group Koothu-P-Pattarai. Shroff was said to play the role of a "hoodlum", who was chosen after Kumararaja had approached several other Tamil actors, who declined the offer, fearing of their "image". According to the director, the role required a senior person, and Shroff had fit the role "completely". Speaking of his role, Shroff remarked that he had done things in the film that he hadn't dared to do in the past 30 years of his career, quoting "I am literally a monster in the film. Actually, I am more like a coconut – hard on the outside, but a veritable softie inside". Ravi Krishna plays a "lover boy", whose role, he claimed would be totally different from his earlier roles. Ravi Krishna was Kumararaja's first choice for the character as he had written it with keeping Ravi Krishna in mind. Sampath Raj enacts the role of a gangster named Pasupathy. Kumararaja finalised Guru Somasundaram for the character of Kaalayan, after he had seen him performing the titular character in Koothu-P-Pattarai's play Chandrahari. Kumararaja had stated that the voice modulation and pattern of the Kaalaiyan character were based on Somasundaram's performance in the play Chandrahari, which eventually resulted in casting him in the film. Somasundaram cited that the dialogues were also written "keeping the artist in mind".

Yasmin Ponnappa, a popular Bengaluru based model, who had appeared in television advertisements and won many beauty pageants, was selected for the role of the lead female character. Her role was, however, written for Pooja Umashankar, keeping her in mind, who couldn't accept the offer as she had given her dates to Bala's magnum opus Naan Kadavul. The details about the crew members were also published, when the film was announced in early December. P. S. Vinod was chosen as the cinematographer, who had earlier shot films like Musafir and My Wife's Murder, while Videsh was announced as the art director, Super Subbarayan as the stunt master and Kalyan and Ajay Raj as choreographers. Vasuki Bhaskar was appointed as the costume designer. However, during the making of the film 'Super' Subbarayan was replaced by his son Dhilip Subbarayan.

== Themes and influences ==
Aaranya Kaandam is named after one of the chapters from the epic Ramayana meaning "Jungle Chapter". It is supposedly the first neo-noir film in Tamil cinema and influenced by films like Traffic and Pulp Fiction. Thiagarajan Kumararaja said that his inspiration behind making a gangster film was revealed to be The Godfather as well as the thought of "how someone becomes a gangster and continues to be one", clarifying that Aaranya Kaandam was not a biography or history of a gangster but "a page out of the life of a gangster".

== Music ==
Yuvan Shankar Raja was signed as the music director, who was working on a gangster film again after the likes of Arinthum Ariyamalum, Pattiyal and Pudhupettai. Kumararaja divulged that he actually hadn't anyone in mind, but joined with Yuvan Shankar, following producer Charan's recommendation, who shared a "good working relationship" with the composer. Initially a soundtrack was also planned to be composed, with Gangai Amaran being roped in to pen lyrics, however Charan disclosed later that the film would feature no songs at all, becoming Yuvan Shankar Raja's second film project after Adhu without a soundtrack. Charan told that the background music of this film will be released on CD's which eventually proved false. The song "Moodupanikkul" from Thirudan Police (2014) was originally composed for this film.

== Release ==
"Once you create a believable fictional universe, you suck the audiences into that world and they tag along for the ride. Halfway through, their suspension of disbelief meets with an abrupt halt, when you include a real-world element like a 'bleep'. Every effort that the filmmakers have put into the film just goes down the drain.

— Thiagarajan Kumararaja on bleeping out words in Aaranya Kaandam.

The film was first screened on 30 October 2010 at the South Asian International Film Festival in New York City. The film was incomplete at that time, with post-production works pending, and a low-quality version without colour correction and without a film score was projected at the festival. Despite the drawbacks, the film gained positive feedbacks and went on to win the Grand Jury prize for Best Film.

After completion, the film was screened to the regional censor board in Chennai, who declined to clear it. The committee had demanded 52 cuts and several consequential sub-cuts, particularly due to profanity and excessive violence, before permitting a theatrical release. Kumararaja, who admitted that he had expected difficulties in the censorship, disapproved of the board's demands as he wanted to present the film uncompromisingly to the audiences. He claimed that the usage of "bad language" was "part of developing the characters" in his story, while he also disagreed with bleeping out the "objectionable" words since he felt "it throws audiences off the film's narrative". Producer Charan voiced the same opinion, citing that he had made the film for a "mature audience", took the film to the Central Tribunal at Delhi.

=== Critical response ===
Aaranya Kaandam opened to strong critical acclaim. The India Daily lauded the director and the producer for making a "strikingly different film that is raw, realistic and is just like watching angry men up close", further adding that "picturizing crude realities of life so real needs amazing guts". The leading actors, particularly Jackie Shroff and Sampath, were appreciated for their performances, being labelled as "perfect", while film score and cinematography were praised as well, citing that "Yuvan Shankar Raja deserves all accolades for a fantastic re-recording" and that "Vinod's lens captures the darker sides of city life well". Rediff's Pavithra Srinivasan gave the film 3 out of 5, claiming that film "bypasses gangster clichés". The reviewer also spoke in high terms of the cast and crew, pointing out Guru Somasundaram's performance whose "gleeful cackles at the rooster fight, pathetic rumblings to his son and wide-eyed act in the Lodge are wonderful to behold" and Yuvan Shankar Raja's score, described as "easily [one of] the movie's biggest strengths". Sify's reviewer appreciated Kumararaja for "taking the road less travelled", but criticised the extensive violence in the film, terming it the "most violent and bloody film ever to get through Chennai regional censors". In regard to the performances of the cast, he cited that the best performance came from Sampath, who "just smirks throughout the film", while claiming that Yasmin was "fantastic in her début role".

Indo-Asian News Service's critic described the film as a "gangster movie which stands out with its realistic portrayal and no-nonsense treatment", further adding that "good performances, effective dialogues, slick editing and amazing camera-work help the movie stand out from the crowd". A reviewer from Chennai Online wrote that the film was made "near-perfect" featuring "some stunning performances, sharp dialogues and excellent camera work and music". Jackie Shroff and P. S. Vinod, in particular, won high praise from the critic, who wrote that the former "proves his class" and "shines in the don’s role", while they had done a "terrific job and should be considered a major factor for the film’s success at the box-office". N. Venkateswaran from The Times of India rated the film 4.5 out of 5 (the highest rating for any Tamil film to that point), while Hindustan Times critic Gautaman Bhaskaran gave 3.5 out of 5. Baradwaj Rangan commended the film, citing that "with most mainstream films, especially in Tamil, you know some fifteen minutes in if they’re working for you (or not) [...] But there are a few that leave you hanging until almost the end [...], and then, gradually, things begin to cohere and reshape your entire thus-far experience, and you slap your forehead and smile and say, wow! This is one of those films."

== Re-release ==
The film was re-released on 13 March 2026.

== Accolades ==
National Film Awards

- Best Editing – Praveen K. L. & N. B. Srikanth
- Best First Film of a Director – Thiagarajan Kumararaja
- Indira Gandhi Golden Lotus Award of a Producer – S. P. B. Charan

6th Vijay Awards

- Best Story, Screenplay Writer -Thiagarajan Kumararaja
- Best Cinematographer – P. S. Vinod
- Best Background Score – Yuvan Shankar Raja
- Best Stunt Director – Dhilip Subbarayan
- Best Film (nominated)
- Best Director – Thiagarajan Kumararaja (nominated)
- Best Supporting Actor – Somasundaram (nominated)
- Best Villain – Jackie Shroff (nominated)
- Best Editor – Praveen K. L. & N. B. Srikanth (nominated)
- Best Art Director – Videsh (nominated)
- Best Make Up Artistes (nominated)

Vikatan Awards

- Best Villain – Jackie Shroff
- Best Screenplay Writer – Thiagarajan Kumararaja

South Asian International Film Festival

- Grand Jury Award for Best Film

London International Film Festival

- Western Union Audience Award

Aaranya Kaandam appeared on many top ten or top five lists of the best films of 2011.

- 1st — The Hindu
- 2nd — The Asian Age
- 4th — Rediff

== Bibliography ==
- Dhananjayan, G. (2014). Pride of Tamil Cinema: 1931 to 2013. Blue Ocean Publishers. ISBN 978-93-84301-05-7.
