= Thiagarajan Kumararaja =

Indian filmmaker

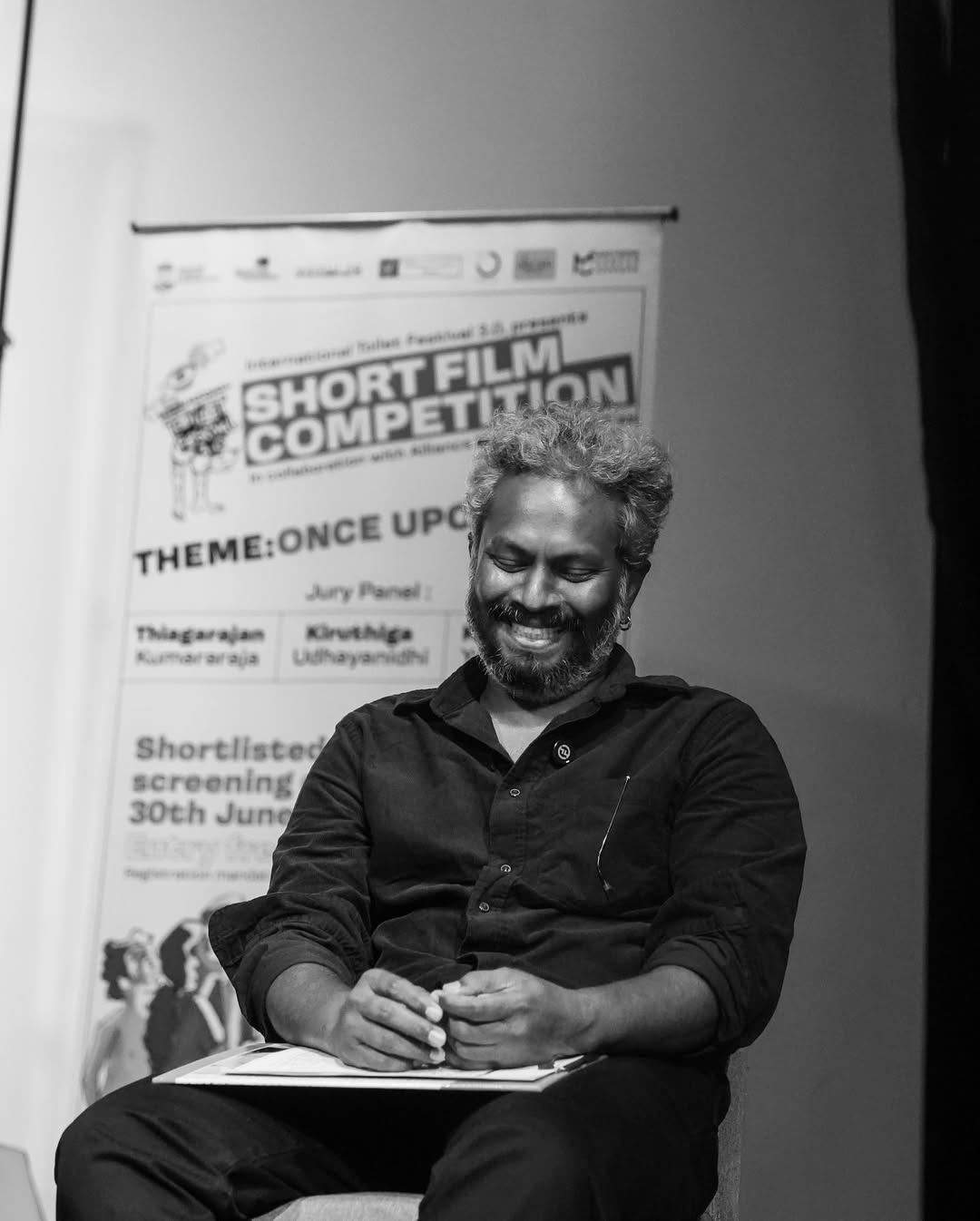
- Thiagarajan Kumararaja at the Short Film competition in 2025
- Born: Madras, Tamil Nadu, India
- Education: Loyola College, Chennai
- Occupations: Film director, screenwriter, producer, and ad director
- Years active: 2008–present

Thiagarajan Kumararaja is an Indian filmmaker who works in Tamil cinema. He made his feature film debut with the critically acclaimed neo-noir gangster film Aaranya Kaandam (2011), which earned him the Indira Gandhi Award for Best Debut Film of a Director at the 59th National Film Awards.

== Career ==
Kumararaja enrolled for a Visual Communications course at the Loyola College, Chennai, but dropped out shortly after to make films. Kumararaja cited that it was composer Ilaiyaraaja's music that animated him to come to films and to study Visual Communications in the first place. However, he discontinued his studies in 1998 and started to work as a freelance copywriter and photographer for a while. He went on to shoot advertisement films and also directed a five-part documentary on South Indian Temples, Sthala Puranam for Vijay TV. In 2005, he participated at the one-minute film competition 60 Seconds to Fame by Ability Foundation, aiming for the prize money. His short film Becky was awarded the first prize at the Ability Fest 2005. Kumararaja then collaborated with Pushkar-Gayathri, writing the dialogue of their directorial debut Oram Po (2007). He also wrote song lyrics for their second project Va (2010) as well. Through Pushkar-Gayathri, Kumararaja met S. P. B. Charan, who agreed to produce his first feature film Aaranya Kaandam.

Kumararaja began writing his maiden film in December 2006. Although he had wanted to make a "racy film" – he wrote the climax part first, before going on to add multiple storylines – he said that the film had eventually turned out to be a "leisurely paced film, taking its own time to unfold". Kumararaja met Charan in January 2007 and narrated him the script for two hours. Filming was supposed to commence by late 2007, but Charan opted to produce another film first. Aaranya Kaandam was launched in December 2008, starring Ravi Krishna and Sampath Raj, with Bollywood actor Jackie Shroff, who was being introduced to Tamil films. Kumararaja took more than one and a half years to complete the film, which was entirely shot in and around Chennai. Upon completion, the film ran into trouble when the regional censor board in Chennai refused to clear it, demanding 52 cuts due to profanity and excessive violence. Kumararaja expressed that he made the film for a matured audience and not for children, while adding that he expected difficulties in the censorship. Since he wanted to present the film uncompromisingly to the audiences, he and Charan approached the Central Tribunal at Delhi, that cleared the film. Dubbed as the first neo-noir film in Tamil cinema, Aaranya Kaandam opened to strong critical acclaim, winning the Grand Jury Award for Best Film at the 2010 South Asian International Film Festival, and two prizes at the 59th National Film Awards, including the Indira Gandhi Award for Best Debut Film of a Director for Kumararaja.

In 2015, he was involved as a script consultant for the Tamil film Yennai Arindhaal, which was co-written and directed by Gautham Vasudev Menon.

== Filmography ==
- Note: all films are in Tamil, unless otherwise noted.

=== As director ===
As director
Year	Title	Director	Writer	Producer	Notes
2011	Aaranya Kaandam	Yes	Yes	No	
2019	Super Deluxe	Yes	Yes	Yes	
2023	Modern Love Chennai	Yes	Yes	Creative	Web series; Episode 6 - "Ninaivo Oru Paravai"
2027	Pocket Novel	Yes	No	Yes	

=== As writer and lyricist ===
Year	Film	Writer	Lyricist	Notes
2007	Oram Po	Dialogue	Yes	for the "Oram Po Theme"
2010	Va	No	Yes	for all songs except "Saudi Basha"
2015	X: Past Is Present	Yes	No	for the segment "Summer Holiday" (Note: While the anthology features segments made in Hindi and English, his segment was made in Tamil.)
2018	Seethakaathi	No	Yes	for the song "Ayya"

== Awards ==
Film	Award	Category	Result	Ref
Becky	60 Seconds to Fame	One-minute film	first prize	
Aaranya Kandam	59th National Film Awards	Best Debut Film of a Director	Won	
Aaranya Kandam	6th Vijay Awards	Best Director	Nominated	
Aaranya Kandam	6th Vijay Awards	Best Story, Screenplay Writer	Won	
Aaranya Kandam	Ananda Vikatan Cinema Awards	Best Screenplay Writer	Won	
Aaranya Kandam	South Indian International Movie Awards	Best Director – Tamil	Nominated	
Super Deluxe	Indian Film Festival of Melbourne	Best Director	Nominated	
Super Deluxe	Indian Film Festival of Melbourne	Equality in Cinema (Honorary Award)	Won	
Super Deluxe	9th AACTA Awards	Best Asian Film	Nominated	
Super Deluxe	Ananda Vikatan Cinema Awards	Best Screenplay	Won	
Super Deluxe	Edison Awards	Best Director	Nominated	
Super Deluxe	Edison Awards	Best Screenplay	Nominated	
Super Deluxe	Critics Choice Film Awards	Best Movie of the Year	Won	
Super Deluxe	Critics Choice Film Awards	Best Film - Tamil	Won	
Super Deluxe	Critics Choice Film Awards	Best Director - Tamil	Won	
Super Deluxe	Critics Choice Film Awards	Best Writing - Tamil	Won	
Super Deluxe	South Indian International Movie Awards	Best Director	Nominated	
Seethakaathi	2018 Tamil Nadu State Film Awards	Best Lyricist for the song Ayya	Won	
