= 67th Filmfare Awards South =

Annual film award in India

- Presented on: 9 October 2022
- Site: Bangalore International Exhibition Centre, Bengaluru, Karnataka, India
- Hosted by: Ramesh Aravind; Diganth
- Organized by: The Times Group
- Magazine issue: Filmfare
- Official website: Filmfare Awards South 2022

Highlights
- Best Film: Pushpa: The Rise (Telugu); Jai Bhim (Tamil); Act 1978 (Kannada); Ayyappanum Koshiyum (Malayalam)
- Lifetime achievement: Allu Aravind; Puneeth Rajkumar
- Most awards: Soorarai Pottru (8)
- Most nominations: Soorarai Pottru (10)

Television coverage
- Channel: Zee Telugu (Telugu); Zee Tamil (Tamil); Zee Keralam (Malayalam); Zee Kannada (Kannada)
- Network: Zee Entertainment Enterprises

The 67th Filmfare Awards South is an awards event that took place in Bengaluru, India on 9 October 2022. The ceremony recognised and honoured the best films and performances from the Telugu, Tamil, Kannada and Malayalam films and music released in between 2020 and 2021, along with special honours for lifetime contributions and few special awards. The event took place at Bangalore International Exhibition Centre, in Bengaluru on 9 October 2022.

== Winners and nominees ==
=== Main awards ===
==== Kannada cinema ====
Best Film	Best Director
Act 1978 – Devaraj R; Badava Rascal – Dhananjay; Dia – D. Krishna Chaitanya; Garuda Gamana Vrishabha Vahana – Ravi Rai Kalasa, Vachan Shetty; Salaga – K. P. Srikanth; Shivaji Surathkal – Anup Gowda, Rekha K. N.	Raj B. Shetty – Garuda Gamana Vrishabha Vahana; Akash Srivatsa – Shivaji Surathkal; Duniya Vijay – Salaga; Darling Krishna – Love Mocktail; Jadesh Kumar Hampi – Gentleman; Mansore – Act 1978; Shankar Guru – Badava Rascal
Best Actor	Best Actress
Dhananjaya – Badava Rascal; Darshan – Roberrt; Krishna – Love Mocktail; Prajwal Devaraj – Gentleman; Raj B. Shetty – Garuda Gamana Vrishabha Vahana; Ramesh Aravind – Shivaji Surathkal; Rishab Shetty – Garuda Gamana Vrishabha Vahana	Yagna Shetty – Act 1978; Aarohi Narayan – Bheemasena Nalamaharaja; Amrutha Iyengar – Badava Rascal; Asha Bhat – Roberrt; Kushee Ravi – Dia; Milana Nagaraj – Love Mocktail; Reba – Rathnan Prapancha
Best Supporting Actor	Best Supporting Actress
B. Suresha – Act 1978; Achyuth Kumar – Bheemasena Nalamaharaja; Balaji Manohar – Amruth Apartments; Dhananjaya – Salaga; Nagabhushana – Badava Rascal; Pramod Panju – Rathnan Prapancha; Sanchari Vijay – Gentleman	Umashree – Rathnan Prapancha; Aarohi Narayan – Shivaji Surathkal; Amrutha Iyengar – Love Mocktail; Meghashree – Mugilpete; Sparsha Rekha – Popcorn Monkey Tiger; Usha Ravishankar – Salaga
Best Music Director	Best Lyricist
Vasuki Vaibhav – Badava Rascal; Arjun Janya and V. Harikrishna – Roberrt; B. Ajaneesh Loknath – Gentleman; Charan Raj – Salaga; Raghu Dixit – Love Mocktail; Sridhar V Sambhavam – Mugilpete	Jayanth Kaikini – "Teladu Mugile" from Act 1978; Dhananjay – "Udupi Hotelu" from Badava Rascal; Kaviraj – "Mellane" from Rider; Nagarjun Sharma – "Malaye Malaye" from Salaga; Pramod Maravanthe – "Doora Hogo Munna" from Mugilpete; V. Nagendra Prasad – "Dheera Sammohagaara" from Bicchugatti
Best Playback Singer – Male	Best Playback Singer – Female
Raghu Dixit – "Maley Maley Maleye" from Ninna Sanihake; Nakul Abhyankar – "Tareefu Maadalu" from Mugilpete; Kadabarege Muniraju – "Teladu Mugilu" from Act 1978; Sanjith Hegde – "Mellane" from Rider; Sid Sriram – "Haayagide" from Tom and Jerry; Vijay Prakash – "Udupi Hotelu" from Badava Rascal	Anuradha Bhat – "Dheera Sammohagaara" from Bicchugatti; Aishwarya Rangarajan – "Malaye Malaye" from Salaga; Chinmayi Sripaada – "Soul of Dia" from Dia; Shreya Ghoshal – "Kannu Hodiyaka" from Roberrt; Shruthi VS – "Love you Chinna" from Love Mocktail; Shwetha Devanahally – "Tareefu Maadalu" from Mugilpete
Critics Best Actor	Critics Best Actress
Darling Krishna – Love Mocktail	Amrutha Iyengar – Badava Rascal; Milana Nagaraj – Love Mocktail

==== Malayalam cinema ====
Best Film	Best Director
Ayyappanum Koshiyum – Ranjith, P. M. Sasidharan; Anjaam Pathiraa – Ashiq Usman; Drishyam 2 – Antony Perumbavoor; Joji – Fahadh Faasil, Dileesh Pothan, Syam Pushkaran; Malik – Anto Joseph; Minnal Murali – Sophia Paul; Nayattu – Ranjith, P. M. Sasidharan, Martin Prakkat; The Great Indian Kitchen – Dijo Augustine, Jomon Jacob, Vishnu Rajan, Sajin S Raj	Senna Hegde – Thinkalazhcha Nishchayam; Basil Joseph – Minnal Murali; Dileesh Pothan – Joji; Jeethu Joseph – Drishyam 2; Jeo Baby – The Great Indian Kitchen; Mahesh Narayanan – Malik; Midhun Manuel Thomas – Anjaam Pathiraa; Sachy – Ayyappanum Koshiyum
Best Actor	Best Actress
Biju Menon – Ayyappanum Koshiyum as SI Ayyappan Nair; Fahadh Faasil – Malik as Ahammadali Sulaiman / Alikka; Indrans – Home as Oliver Twist; Jayasurya – Vellam as Murali Nambiar/Vellam Murali; Joju George – Madhuram as Sabu; Kunchacko Boban – Anjaam Pathiraa as Dr. Anwar Hussain; Mohanlal – Drishyam 2 as Georgekutty; Tovino Thomas – Minnal Murali as Jaison Varghese / Minnal Murali and Martin Rangakala	Nimisha Sajayan – The Great Indian Kitchen as Wife; Anna Ben – Kappela as Jessy; Darshana Rajendran – C U Soon as Anumol Sebastian; Grace Antony – Halal Love Story as Suhra; Kani Kusruti – Biriyaani as Khadeeja; Rima Kallingal – Santhoshathinte Onnam Rahasyam as Maria; Shobhana – Varane Avashyamund as Neena
Best Supporting Actor	Best Supporting Actress
Joju George – Nayattu as ASI Maniyan; Guru Somasundaram – Minnal Murali as Shibu; Joju George – Halal Love Story as Siraj; Sharafudheen – Anjaam Pathiraa as Dr. Benjamin Louis; Shine Tom Chacko – Kurup as Bhasi Pillai/Pillaichan; Sidhartha Siva – Kilometers and Kilometers as Sunny/Veerbhai; Suraj Venjaramoodu – Kaanekkaane as Paul Mathai	Gowri Nandha – Ayyappanum Koshiyum as Kannamma; Asha Sharath – Drishyam 2 as Geetha Prabhakar; Leona Lishoy – Anveshanam as ACP Latha Siddharth; Nimisha Sajayan – One as Lathika Satheesh; Srinda – Kuruthi as Sumathi; Unnimaya Prasad – Joji as Bincy Jaison; Urvashi – Varane Avashyamund as Dr. Sherly
Best Music Director	Best Lyricist
M. Jayachandran – Sufiyum Sujatayum; Alphons Joseph – Varane Avashyamund; Arun Muraleedharan – Anugraheethan Antony; Ouseppachan – Ellam Sheriyakum; Ronnie Raphael – Marakkar: Arabikadalinte Simham; Sreehari K. Nair – Maniyarayile Ashokan	Rafeeq Ahmed – "Ariyathariyathe" from Ayyappanum Koshiyum; Anwar Ali – "Pakaliravugalal from Kurup; B. K. Harinaranayan – "Neeye En Thayee" from Marakkar: Arabikadalinte Simham; B. K. Harinaranayan – "Medamasa" from Al Mallu; Manu Manjith – "Marakkan Kazhiyilla" from Anugraheethan Antony; Santosh Varma – Muthunne Kannugalil from Varane Avashyamund
Best Playback Singer – Male	Best Playback Singer – Female
Shahabaz Aman – "Akashamayavale" from Vellam; K. S. Harisankar – "Kaamini" from Anugraheethan Antony; K. S. Harisankar – "Pinnenthe" from Ellam Sheriyakum; K. S. Harisankar – "Peyyum Nilavu" from Maniyarayile Ashokan; Madhu Balakrishnan – "Kala Devadha" from Love FM; Sid Sriram – "Uyire" from Gauthamante Radham; Sid Sriram – "Olu" from Maniyarayile Ashokan; Vijay Yesudas – "Poothalam Pularithalam" from Star	K. S. Chithra – "Theerame" from Malik; Jyotsna Radhakrishnan – "Ithal Ithalayi" from Kshanam; Mridula Warrier – "Enthinen Pranayame" from Bhoomiyile Manohara Swakaryam; Neha Nair – "Pakaliravugalal" from Kurup; Nithya Mammen – "Vaathikkalu Vellarippravu" from Sufiyum Sujatayum; Sithara Krishnakumar – "Kadukumanikkoru" from Kappela; Sujatha Mohan – "Neelambale" from The Priest; Swetha Mohan – "Muthunne Kannugalil" from Varane Avashyamund
Critics Best Actor	Critics Best Actress
Jayasurya – Vellam as Murali Nambiar/Vellam Murali	Kani Kusruti – Biriyaani as Khadeeja

==== Tamil cinema ====
Best Film	Best Director
Jai Bhim – Jyothika & Suriya; Ka Pae Ranasingam – Kotapadi J. Rajesh; Kannum Kannum Kollaiyadithaal – Anto Joseph; Karnan – Kalaipuli S. Thanu; Mandela – S. Sashikanth, Chakravarthy Ramachandra, Balaji Mohan; Sarpatta Parambarai – Shanmugam Dhakshanraj, Pa. Ranjith; Soorarai Pottru – Jyothika, Suriya & Guneet Monga	Sudha Kongara – Soorarai Pottru; Desingh Periyasamy – Kannum Kannum Kollaiyadithaal; Madonne Ashwin – Mandela; Mari Selvaraj – Karnan; P. Virumaandi – Ka Pae Ranasingam; Pa. Ranjith – Sarpatta Parambarai; T. J. Gnanavel – Jai Bhim
Best Actor	Best Actress
Suriya – Soorarai Pottru as Nedumaaran "Maara" Rajangam; Arya – Sarpatta Parambarai as Kabilan Munirathnam; Ashok Selvan – Oh My Kadavule as Arjun Marimuthu; Dhanush – Karnan as Karnan; Dulquer Salmaan – Kannum Kannum Kollaiyadithaal as Siddharth; K. Manikandan – Jai Bhim as Rajakannu; Suriya – Jai Bhim as Adv. Chandru	Lijomol Jose – Jai Bhim as Sengeni Rajakannu; Aishwarya Rajesh – Ka Pae Ranasingam as Ariyanachi Ranasingam; Aparna Balamurali – Soorarai Pottru as Sundari "Bommi" Nedumaaran; Dushara Vijayan – Sarpatta Parambarai as Mariyamma; Jyothika – Ponmagal Vandhal as Venba / Angel / Sakthijothi; Jyothika – Udanpirappe as Maathangi Sargunam
Best Supporting Actor	Best Supporting Actress
Pasupathy – Sarpatta Parambarai as Rangan Vaathiyar; Gautham Vasudev Menon – Kannum Kannum Kollaiyadithaal as DCP Prathap Chakravarthi; Paresh Rawal – Soorarai Pottru as Paresh Goswami; Prakash Raj – Jai Bhim as IG Perumalsamy; R. Sarathkumar – Vaanam Kottattum as Bose Kaalai; Samuthirakani – Udanpirappe as Sargunam Vaathiyaar; S. J. Suryah – Maanaadu as DCP V. Dhanushkodi	Urvashi – Soorarai Pottru as Pechi Rajangam; Anupama Kumar – Sarpatta Parambarai as Bakkiyam; Nivedhithaa Sathish – Udanpirappe as Keerthana Sargunam; Radhika Sarathkumar – Vaanam Kottattum as Chandra; Sanchana Natarajan – Sarpatta Parambarai as Lakshmi; Sheela Rajkumar – Mandela as Thenmozhi; Vani Bhojan – Oh My Kadavule as Meera
Best Music Director	Best Lyricist
G. V. Prakash Kumar – Soorarai Pottru; Anirudh Ravichander – Darbar; Anirudh Ravichander – Doctor; Anirudh Ravichander – Master; D. Imman – Annaatthe; Leon James – Oh My Kadavule	Arivu – "Neeye Oli" from Sarpatta Parambarai; Karthik Netha – "Idhuvum Kadandhu Pogum" from Netrikann; Ko Sesha – "Kadhaippoma" from Oh My Kadavule; Thamarai – "Yaar Azhaippadhu" from Maara; Uma Devi – "Aarariro" from Kadaseela Biriyani; Yugabharathi – "Kaiyilea Aagasam" from Soorarai Pottru
Best Playback Singer – Male	Best Playback Singer – Female
Christin Jos and Govind Vasantha – "Aagasam" from Soorarai Pottru; Arivu – "Vaathi Raid" from Master; Bharath Sankar – "Mandela Tribute" from Mandela; Kapil Kapilan – "Adiye" from Bachelor; Sid Sriram – "Kadhaippoma" from Oh My Kadavule; Vijay – "Kutti Story" from Master	Dhee – "Kaattu Payale" from Soorarai Pottru; Jonita Gandhi – "Chellama" from Doctor; K. S. Chithra – "Thangam Thangam" from Annaatthe; Kidakkuzhi Mariyammal – "Kandaa Vara Sollunga" from Karnan; Shashaa Tirupati – "Bodhai Kaname" from Oh Manapenne!
Critics Best Actor	Critics Best Actress
Arvind Swamy – Thalaivii as M. J. Ramachandran; Arya – Sarpatta Parambarai as Kabilan Munirathnam	Aparna Balamurali – Soorarai Pottru as Sundari Nedumaaran

==== Telugu cinema ====
Best Film	Best Director
Pushpa: The Rise – Naveen Yerneni & Y. Ravi Shankar; Akhanda – Miryala Ravinder Reddy; Ala Vaikunthapurramuloo – Allu Aravind, S. Radha Krishna; Jathi Ratnalu – Nag Ashwin; Love Story – Narayan Das K Narang, Puskar Ram Mohan Rao; Palasa 1978 – Dhyan Atluri; Uppena – Naveen Yerneni, Y. Ravi Shankar	Sukumar – Pushpa: The Rise; Buchi Babu Sana – Uppena; Karuna Kumar – Palasa 1978; Rahul Sankrityan – Shyam Singha Roy; Sekhar Kammula – Love Story; Trivikram Srinivas – Ala Vaikunthapurramuloo; Uday Gurrala – Mail
Best Actor	Best Actress
Allu Arjun – Pushpa: The Rise as Pushpa Raj; Mahesh Babu – Sarileru Neekevvaru as Major Ajay Krishna; Naga Chaitanya – Love Story as Revanth; Nani – Shyam Singha Roy as Shyam Singha Roy and Vasudev Ghanta; Naveen Polishetty – Jathi Ratnalu as "Jogipet" Srikanth; Rakshit Atluri – Palasa 1978 as Mohan Rao; Vaishnav Tej – Uppena as Aasirvadham	Sai Pallavi – Love Story as Mounika Rani; Chandini Chowdary – Colour Photo as "Deepthi Varma"; Krithi Shetty – Uppena as Sangeetha "Bebbamma"; Pooja Hegde – Ala Vaikunthapurramuloo as Amulya; Rashmika Mandanna –Bheeshma as Chaitra; Rashmika Mandanna – Pushpa: The Rise as Srivalli; Sai Pallavi – Shyam Singha Roy as Rosie "Maithreyi"
Best Supporting Actor	Best Supporting Actress
Murali Sharma – Ala Vaikunthapurramuloo as Valmiki; Jagapathi Babu – Republic as Panja Dashrath; Praveen – Naandhi as Santosh; Rahul Ramakrishna – Jathi Ratnalu as "Jogipet" Ravi; Sunil – Pushpaka Vimanam as Sub-inspector Rangam; Thiruveer – Palasa 1978 as Rangarao; Vennela Kishore – Bheeshma as Parimal	Tabu – Ala Vaikunthapurramuloo as Yasoda; Madonna Sebastian – Shyam Singha Roy as Lawyer Padmavathi; Priyanka Jawalkar – Gamanam as Zara; Ramya Krishna – Republic as 'Visakha' Vani; Sharanya Pradeep – Jaanu as Subhashini; Vijayashanti – Sarileru Neekevvaru as Bharathi
Best Music Director	Best Lyricist
Devi Sri Prasad – Pushpa: The Rise; Devi Sri Prasad – Sarileru Neekevvaru; Gopi Sundar – Most Eligible Bachelor; Radhan – Jathi Ratnalu; Thaman S – Ala Vaikunthapurramuloo; Thaman S – Vakeel Saab; Vishal Chandrashekhar – Varudu Kaavalenu	Sirivennela Seetharama Sastry – "Life of Ram" from Jaanu; Ananta Sriram – "Chalaaki Chinnammi" from Narappa; Raghuram – "Hey Idi Nenena" from Solo Brathuke So Better; Ramajogayya Sastry – "Maguva Maguva" from Vakeel Saab; Rambabu Gosala – "Kola Kalle Ilaa" from Varudu Kaavalenu; Sirivennela Seetharama Sastry – "Pranavalaya" from Shyam Singha Roy; Viswa – "Ningi Chutte" from Uma Maheswara Ugra Roopasya
Best Playback Singer – Male	Best Playback Singer – Female
Sid Sriram – "Srivalli" from Pushpa: The Rise; Sid Sriram – "Samajavaragamana" from Ala Vaikunthapurramuloo; Sid Sriram – "Manasa Manasa" from Most Eligible Bachelor; Sid Sriram – "Maguva Maguva" from Vakeel Saab; Anurag Kulkarni – "Ramuloo Ramulaa" from Ala Vaikunthapurramuloo; Anurag Kulkarni – "Sirivennala" from Shyam Singha Roy; Armaan Malik – "Butta Bomma" from Ala Vaikunthapurramuloo; Ram Miriyala – "Chitti" from Jathi Ratnalu	Indravathi Chauhan – "Oo Antava Oo Oo Antava" from Pushpa: The Rise; Aditi Bhavaraju – "Baavochhadu" from Palasa 1978; Chinmayi – "Manasulone Nilichipoke" from Varudu Kaavalenu; Madhu Priya – "He's So Cute" from Sarileru Neekevvaru; Ramya Behara – "Korameesam Polisoda" from Krack; Sinduri – "Chenguna Chenguna" from Varudu Kaavalenu
Critics Best Actor	Critics Best Actress
Nani – Shyam Singha Roy as Shyam Singha Roy and Vasudev Ghanta	Sai Pallavi – Shyam Singha Roy as Maithreyi / Rosie

=== Technical awards ===
Best Cinematographer
- Miroslaw Brozek – Pushpa: The Rise (Telugu)
- Niketh Bommireddy – Soorarai Pottru (Tamil)
- Shreesha Kuduvalli – Rathnan Prapancha (Kannada)
- Shyju Khalid – Nayattu (Malayalam)
Best Choreography
- Sekhar Master – "Ramuloo Ramulaa" from Ala Vaikunthapurramuloo (Telugu)
- Dinesh – "Vaathi Coming" from Master (Tamil)
- Jani Master – "Feel the Power" from Yuvarathnaa (Kannada)

=== Special awards ===
Special Award
- Chiranjeevi Sarja (Note: Awarded posthumously)
Lifetime Achievement
- Allu Aravind
- Puneeth Rajkumar (Note: Awarded posthumously)
Best Female Debut
- Krithi Shetty – Uppena (Telugu) as Sangeetha "Bebbamma"
- Anaga Narayananan – Thinkalazhcha Nishchayam (Malayalam) as Suja
- Dhanya Ramkumar – Ninna Sanihake (Kannada) as Amrutha
Best Male Debut
- Panja Vaisshnav Tej – Uppena (Telugu) as Aasirvadham
- Dev Mohan – Sufiyum Sujatayum (Malayalam) as Sufi

== Superlatives ==
Films with multiple nominations
Nominations	Film
10	Soorarai Pottru
9	Ala Vaikunthapurramuloo
8	Sarpatta Parambarai
8	Badava Rascal
7	Pushpa: The Rise
7	Salaga
6	Act 1978
6	Love Mocktail
6	Shyam Singha Roy
6	Jai Bhim
6	Act 1978
6	Badava Rascal
6	Love Mocktail
5	Jathi Ratnalu
5	Palasa 1978
5	Oh My Kadavule
5	Mugilpete
4	Garuda Gamana Vrishabha Vahana
4	Shivaji Surathkal
4	Gentleman
4	Love Story
4	Uppena
4	Sarileru Neekevvaru
4	Varudu Kaavalenu
4	Kannum Kannum Kollaiyadithaal
4	Karnan
4	Mandela
4	Garuda Gamana Vrishabha Vahana
4	Gentleman
4	Roberrt
3	Vakeel Saab
3	Ka Pae Ranasingam
3	Udanpirappe
3	Dia
3	Shivaji Surathkal
3	Rathnan Prapancha
2	Bheeshma
2	Most Eligible Bachelor
2	Master
2	Bicchugatti
2	Bheemasena Nalamaharaja

Films with multiple awards (including non-competitive)
Awards	Film
8	Soorarai Pottru
7	Pushpa: The Rise
4	Act 1978
4	Ayyappanum Koshiyum
3	Ala Vaikunthapurramuloo
3	Badava Rascal
3	Sarpatta Parambarai
2	Uppena
2	Shyam Singha Roy
2	Jai Bhim
2	Love Mocktail
2	Ninna Sanihake
2	Rathnan Prapancha

== Presenters and performers ==
Performers
Name	Work
Pooja Hegde	Dance
Mrunal Thakur	Dance
Krithi Shetty	Dance
Saniya Iyappan	Dance
Aindrita Ray	Dance
