= Lady Kash =

Singaporean musician (born 1990)

- Born: Kalaivani Nagaraj; March 30, 1990 (age 36); Singapore
- Origin: Thanjavur, India
- Genres: Hip-hop, rap, film soundtrack
- Occupations: Rapper, songwriter, record executive, creative entrepreneur
- Years active: 2007–present
- Label: AKASHIK
- Website: ladykashonline.com

Lady Kash (born as Kalaivani Nagaraj, in 1990) is a Singaporean-Tamil rapper and songwriter. She founded the independent record label AKASHIK in 2013. In 2018, she collaborated with Poongani Amma to release the bilingual hip-hop song "Villupaattu," which featured Villu Paatu (a type of storytelling through music).

Kash has worked with several established Indian film composers, including A. R. Rahman, Yuvan Shankar Raja, Anirudh Ravichander, Santhosh Narayanan, Harris Jayaraj, and Thaman S.

== Early life and education ==
Kalaivani Nagaraj was born in Singapore and later moved to Thanjavur, India, as a teenager to pursue her studies. She began her career as a rapper and songwriter in 2007.

== Professional career ==
In 2010, she co-wrote and recorded "Irumbile Oru Irudhaiyam” with A. R. Rahman. The song was featured in the Indian Tamil-language film Enthiran.

In January 2014, Kash made her Bollywood debut with the song "Wanna Mash Up?," composed by A. R. Rahman, for the film Highway.

In July 2016, Kash was featured in "Hai Futsal," the official anthem of Premier Futsal, composed by and featuring A. R. Rahman, Virat Kohli, and Karthik. That same year, she released her rendition of "Neruppu Da," a song from the film Kabali. The track was released by AKASHIK in conjunction with Think Music India.

In 2017, Kash released 'Rap Smash,' a medley of A. R. Rahman compositions rearranged as rap tracks, released as a video. She released a rework of Cardi B's "Bodak Yellow" and identified as part of her engagement with the #MeToo movement. Since then, she has released "I Told You So" in February 2018 and "Villupaattu" on March 29, 2018.

In 2021, she participated in the Tamil edition of the reality show Survivor, filmed in Zanzibar, Tanzania, and produced by Zee Tamil and Banijay Asia.

In 2023, her hip-hop single, "Two Cents," was used in the Netflix comedy-drama series, Never Have I Ever.

== Performance history ==
Kash has performed internationally in Canada, Switzerland, the United Kingdom, Malaysia, Sri Lanka, Dubai, and India. During A. R. Rahman's 2014 Infinite Love concert tour, she performed "Irumbile Oru Irudhaiyam" alongside him. She also performed "Rap War" during his Nenje Ezhu concert tour series in 2016 (held in Chennai, Coimbatore, and Madurai), and "Rap War 2.0" at A. R. Rahman Live in Dubai in 2017.

In 2017, she performed at desiFEST in Yonge-Dundas Square (now Sankofa Square) and appeared twice with Anirudh Ravichander during his concerts in Singapore in 2014 and 2016.

== Discography ==
=== Originals ===
Record	Category	Track language	Original artist	Lyrics	Music composer	Additional vocals	Mix	Master	Format	Label	Release	Notes
Villupaattu	Original	Tamil/English	Lady Kash	Lady Kash	Balamurali Balu	V.M. Mahalingam	Sunny M. R. - Mumbai, India	Sunny M. R. - Mumbai, India	Digital Download	AKASHIK	29 March 2018	Bilingual hip-hop/rap single with a music video released on April 15, 2018
I Told You So	Original	English	Lady Kash	Lady Kash	Steve Cliff Valentine, Kirishan Suresh	Divya Vivekanandan	Studio Fourteen - Toronto, Canada	Studio Fourteen - Toronto, Canada	Digital Download	AKASHIK	22 February 2018	Hiphop/rap single with a music video released on 27 March 2018
Running In The Same Space	Single	English	Lady Kash	Lady Kash		Laya	Jeson Huang, Malaysia	Jeson Huang, Malaysia	Digital Download	AKASHIK	7 April 2023	

=== Soundtracks & projects ===
Record	Category	Movie	Language	Track o-Singer(s)	Lyrics	Music composer	Label	Release	Notes
Thala Keezha	Soundtrack	Coffee with Kadhal (Tamil)	Tamil	Nithyashree Venkataramanan	Snehan	Yuvan Shankar Raja	U1 Records	11 October 2022	
OMG Daddy	Soundtrack	Ala Vaikunthapurramuloo (Telugu)	Telugu/ English	Rahul Sipligunj, Roll Rida, Blaaze, Rahul Nambiar	Krishna Chaitanya	S. Thaman	Aditya Music	23 February 2020 (music video)	
Enga Kayila Natta Kudunga	Soundtrack	Adutha Saattai (Tamil)	Tamil	Chellankuppam Subramaniyan	Yugabharathi	Justin Prabhakaran	Muzik247	7 August 2019	
Kalla Kalavaani (Tamil)/Nannu Nammanee (Telugu)	Soundtrack	Chekka Chivantha Vaanam (Tamil)/ Nawab (Telugu)	Tamil/ Telugu/ English	Shakthisree Gopalan	Vairamuthu and Lady Kash (Tamil)/ Sirivennela Seetharama Sastry (Telugu)	A. R. Rahman	Sony Music	5 September 2018	
Supermodel	Soundtrack	Graghanam (Tamil)/Grahanam (Telugu)	Tamil/ English		Lady Kash	Sundaramurthy K.S.	U1 Records	2 May 2017	-
Mission To Sydney	Soundtrack	Si3 (Tamil)	Tamil/ English		Lady Kash, Hari	Harris Jayaraj	Eros Music	27 November 2016	-
Kaatril Aeri	Soundtrack	Parandhu Sella Va (Tamil)	Tamil/ English	Joshua Sridhar	Na. Muthukumar, Lady Kash	Joshua Sridhar	Saregama	2 October 2016	-
Neruppu Da	Soundtrack	Kabali	Tamil		Lady Kash, Arunraja Kamaraj	Santhosh Narayanan	AKASHIK / Think Music India	14 July 2016	Exclusive Version released by AKASHIK in collaboration with Santhosh Narayanan / Think Music India
Wanna Mash Up	Soundtrack	Highway (Hindi)	English	Suvi Suresh, Krissy	Lady Kash, Krissy	A. R. Rahman	T-Series	24 January 2014	-
Oh Penne	Soundtrack	Vanakkam Chennai	Tamil/ English	Anirudh Ravichander	Lady Kash	Anirudh Ravhichander	AKASHIK / Sony Music India	17 October 2013	Original Version released by AKASHIK in collaboration with Anirudh Ravichander / Sony Music India
Pickle Jar	Soundtrack	Pickles The Movie (Tamil/English)	Tamil/ English	Krissy, MK	Lady Kash, Krissy, MK	TR Krishna Chetan	Tantra	18 June 2011	-
Hold On	Soundtrack	Pickles The Movie (Tamil/English)	Tamil/ English		Lady Kash	TR Krishna Chetan	Tantra	18 June 2011	-
Bul Bul	Soundtrack	Devadas (Kannada)	Kannada/ English	Shashank	Lady Kash, V. Nagendra Prasad	Joshua Sridhar	Jhankar Music	13 May 2011	-
Priyankari Remix	Soundtrack	The Thriller (Malayalam)	Malayalam/ English	Benny Dayal, Mamta Mohandas, Krissy	Lady Kash, Hari Narayanan	Dharan Kumar	Manorama Music	17 November 2010	-
Ileana Ileana	Soundtrack	Huduga Hudugi (Kannada)	Kannada/ English	Benny Dayal, Rita	Lady Kash, Kaviraj	Joshua Sridhar	Anand Audio	12 November 2010	-
Bathing At Cannes	Soundtrack	Engeyum Kaadhal (Tamil)	Tamil/ English	Emcee Jesz, Ranina Reddy, Krissy	Lady Kash, Emcee Jesz	Harris Jayaraj	Sony Music	8 November 2010	-
Gaana Bhajana	Soundtrack	Gaana Bajaana (Kannada)	Kannada/ English	Joshua Sridhar, Sayanora Phillip	Lady Kash, Sinchana	Joshua Sridhar	Anand Audio	29 October 2010	-
Naina Miley	Soundtrack	The Robot (Hindi)	Hindi/ English	A. R. Rahman, Suzanne D’Mello, Krissy	Lady Kash, Swanand Kirkire, Krissy	A. R. Rahman	Venus	14 August 2010	-
Irumbile	Soundtrack	Enthiran - The Robot (Tamil)	Tamil/ English	A. R. Rahman, Krissy	Lady Kash, Madhan Karky, Krissy	A. R. Rahman	Think Music India	31 July 2010	-
Dochey	Soundtrack	Puli (Telugu)	Telugu/ English	Shreya Goshal, Krissy	Lady Kash, Chandrabose, Krissy	A. R. Rahman	Sony Music	11 July 2010	-
Pappu Hippo	Soundtrack	Pappu (Telugu)	Telugu/ English	Yashwanth, Radhika, Phani Kalyan	Lady Kash	Phani Kalyan	Aditya Music	25 June 2010	-

=== Projects ===
Record	Category	Track language	Original Artist	Lyrics	Music composer	Additional vocals	Mix	Master	Format	Label	Release	Notes
Can You Hear The World	Project	Tamil/English	Bhavatharini, Lady Kash, Various artists	Lady Kash, Shalini Singh	Bhavatharini	A R Raihanah, Aishwarya R Dhanush, Shalini Singh & Various artists	M Kumaraguruparan, U1 Records - Chennai, India	M Kumaraguruparan, U1 Records - Chennai, India	Digital Download	U1 Records	8 March 2018	In honour of International Women's Day 2018
Rap War 2.0	Project	Tamil/English	Lady Kash, Sri Rascol, ADK	Lady Kash, Sri Rascol, ADK, Respective Songwriters	A. R. Rahman	-	Panchattan Studios / AM Studios - Chennai, India	Panchattan Studios / AM Studios - Chennai, India	Live Performance	A. R. Rahman	17 March 2017	A. R. Rahman Live in Dubai
Naam Hai Futsal	Project	Hindi/English	A. R. Rahman, Virat Kohli, Lady Kash, Karthik	Lady Kash, DDB Mudra Group	A. R. Rahman	-	Panchattan Studios / AM Studios - Chennai, India	Panchattan Studios / AM Studios - Chennai, India	Digital Download	Unisys Music	13 July 2016	Premier Futsal Anthem
Rap War	Project	Tamil/English	Lady Kash, Blaaze, ADK	Lady Kash, Blaaze, ADK, Respective Songwriters	A. R. Rahman	-	Panchattan Studios / AM Studios - Chennai, India	Panchattan Studios / AM Studios - Chennai, India	Live Performance	A. R. Rahman	16 January 2016	Nenje Ezhu - Concert tour series covering Chennai, Coimbatore and Madurai for flood relief efforts & A. R. Rahman Live in Kuala Lumpur, Malaysia
Semmozhiyaana Tamizh Mozhiyaam	Project	Tamil	A. R. Rahman, Lady Kash, Various artists	M. Karunanidhi	A. R. Rahman	T. M. Soundararajan, P. Susheela, Hariharan, Yuvan Shankar Raja, Bombay Jayashri, Chinmayi, Harini & Various artists	Panchattan Studios / AM Studios - Chennai, India	Panchattan Studios / AM Studios - Chennai, India	Digital Download	A. R. Rahman	15 May 2010	More than 50 artists/musicians of Indian origin came together for the Anthem of the World Classical Tamil Conference 2010

=== Renditions ===
Record	Category	Track language	Original artist	Lyrics	Music composer	Music Production	Additional vocals	Mix	Master	Format	Label	Release	Notes
Bodak Yellow – Lady Kash	Remix/Rework	English	Cardi B	Lady Kash	JWhiteDidIt	Krishmusic	-	Studio FlyVision - Paris, France	Studio FlyVision - Paris, France	Digital Download	AKASHIK	10 December 2017	Released in support of the #MeToo movement focusing on empowerment
Rap Smash – Lady Kash	Remix/Rework	Tamil/English	Lady Kash, Respective artists	Lady Kash, Respective Songwriters	A. R. Rahman	Balamurali Balu	-	Sunny M.R. - Mumbai, India	Sunny M.R. - Mumbai, India	Digital Download	AKASHIK	6 January 2017	First-ever medley consisting of A. R. Rahman's popular rap hits which was released with a one-take music video on the composer's 50th birthday
Desi Kalakaar – Lady Kash	Remix/Rework	Tamil/Hindi/English	Yo Yo Honey Singh	Lady Kash, Yo Yo Honey Singh	Yo Yo Honey Singh	DJ AKS	Yo Yo Honey Singh	Reaks Records - Dubai, UAE	Reaks Records - Dubai, UAE	Digital Download	AKASHIK	26 October 2014	Collaboration with DJ AKS; winner of World Top DJs Awards
This Is Love – Lady Kash, Krissy	Remix/Rework	Tamil/English	will.i.am, Eva Simons	Lady Kash, Krissy, William Adams, Eva Simons, Steve Angello, Mike Hamilton, Sebastian Ingross, Max Martin	will.i.am, Steve Angello, Sebastian Ingrosso	Charles Bosco	-	Bosco Studios - London, United Kingdom	Jemi Sitanayah - Indonesia	Digital Download	Independent Release	7 August 2013	Desi rework produced in London, United Kingdom
Replay – Lady Kash	Remix/Rework	English	Iyaz	Lady Kash, J.R. Rotem, Jason Derulo, Sean Kingston, Timothy Thomas, Theron Thomas, Keidran Jones	J.R. Rotem	Edward Sanders	Iyaz	Edward Sanders - Los Angeles, USA	Edward Sanders - Los Angeles, USA	Digital Download	Independent Release	14 February 2013	Valentine's Day edition

=== Collaboration ===
Record	Category	Track language	Original artist	Lyrics	Music composer	Additional vocals	Mix	Master	Format	Label	Release	Notes
Adiye	Collaboration	Tamil/English	Lady Kash, Abhay Jodhpurkar	Lady Kash, Jeffrey Jonathan	Jeffrey Jonathan	A R Raihanah, Aishwarya R Dhanush, Shalini Singh & Various artists	Vinod Verma - Mumbai, India	Vinod Verma - Mumbai, India	Digital Download	Sony Music South	12 November 2015	Music video filmed in India
Kuppai	Collaboration	Tamil/English	Rahul Nambiar, Lady Kash, Krissy	Lady Kash, Rahul Nambiar, Naveen Madhav, Krissy	Rahul Nambiar		PDMS - Mumbai, India	PDMS - Mumbai, India	Digital Download	Channel 7	3 November 2014	Music video filmed in India
Sirithu	Collaboration	Tamil/English	Sarangan, Lady Kash, Krissy	Lady Kash, Pa. Vijay, Krissy, Sarangan	Sarangan Sriranganathan		Multi Facet International - Sydney, Australia	Multi Facet International - Sydney, Australia	Digital Download	Sarangan Music	16 August 2013	Music video filmed in Australia
Hey Penney	Collaboration	Tamil/English	JMal, Lady Kash, Krissy	Lady Kash, Yuwaji, Krissy	Damian Mikhail		Shugar Studios - Petaling Jaya, Malaysia	Shugar Studios - Petaling Jaya, Malaysia	Digital Download	Continental Records	28 July 2013	Music video filmed in Malaysia
Without Your Love	Collaboration	English	Lady Kash, Mez Mariyé, Krissy	Lady Kash, Mez Mariyé, Krissy	Metrognome		TR Krishna Chetan - Chennai, India	TR Krishna Chetan - Chennai, India	Digital Download	Independent Release	7 May 2013	Music video filmed in Singapore

== Television ==
Year	Show	Role	Channel
2021	Survivor	Participant	Zee Tamil
