= Roll Rida =

Telangana rapper

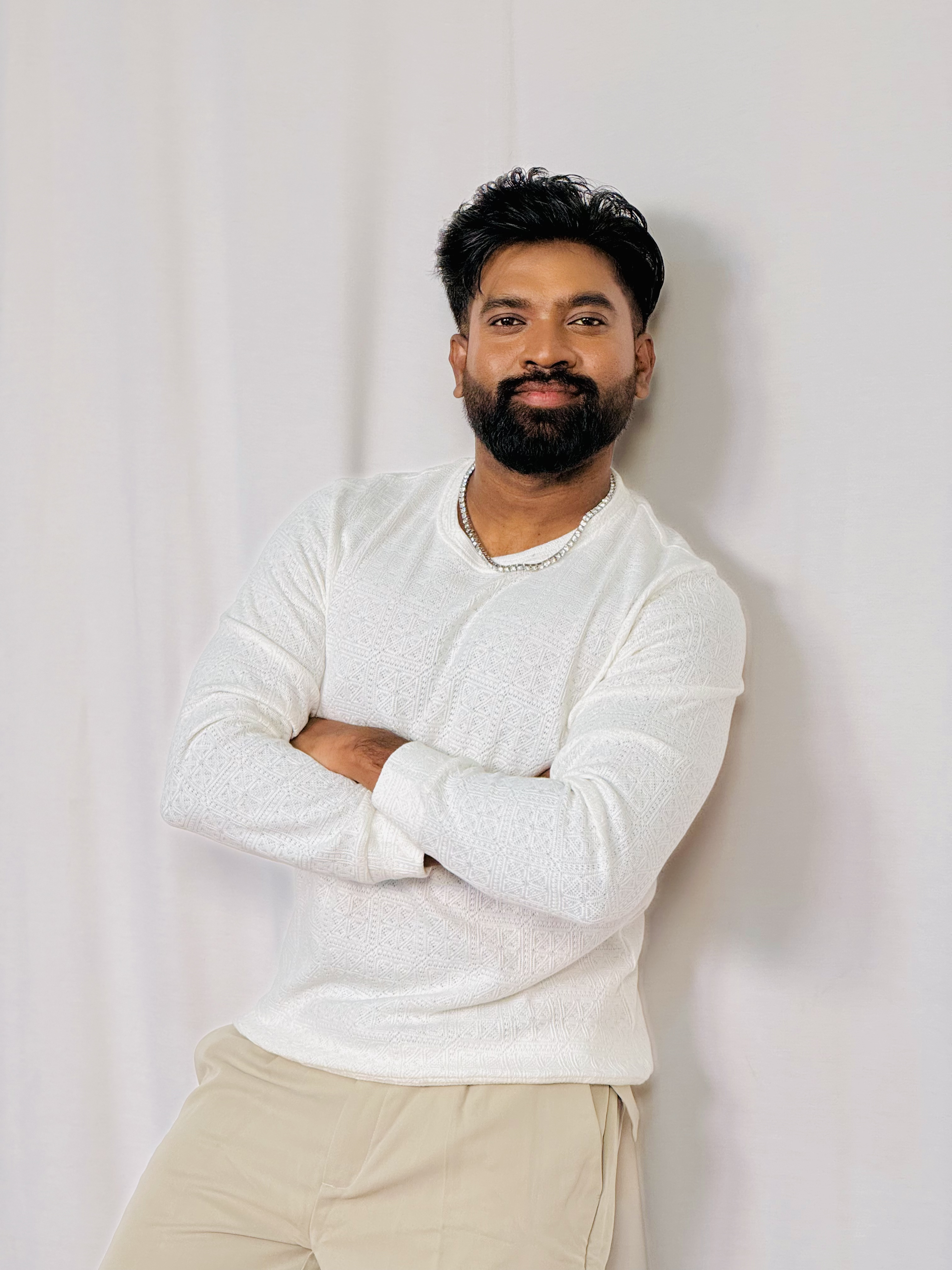

Background information
- Born: Rahul Kumar Velpula; 26 January 1992 (age 34); Warangal District, Telangana
- Origin: Hyderabad, Telangana, India
- Genres: Hip hop, R&B, Indi-pop
- Occupations: Rapper, songwriter, actor
- Instruments: Vocals; keyboards; drums; sampler
- Years active: 2010 – present

Rahul Kumar Velpula (born 26 Jan 1992), known professionally as Roll Rida, is an Indian rapper, songwriter and actor in Telugu films and music.

He became popular with his YouTube rap song on Sankranthi, Patang, was a huge hit with over 17 million views. His other popular songs are Kirana rap, Breaking news Kattif, Shankar Ka Beta, Ivvalane Dilkush, Ignite, Arupu etc. In 2018, he appeared as a contestant for Bigg Boss 2 and successfully reached the 15th week of the show and finished in 6th place.

== Early life ==
Roll Rida was born in Karimnagar, Telangana, India. He did his schooling at Johnson Grammar School in Hyderabad; intermediate at Narayana Junior College, Tarnaka and completed his BTech in computer science from CVR College of Engineering, Hyderabad. He was popular for his singing in school and started a band in college with Syed Kamran.

== Career ==
Roll Rida initially worked at Google, Hyderabad and as Quality Analyst at Tech Mahindra.

He picked his professional name, Roll Rida, upon a friend's suggestion, after popular American rapper, Flo Rida, of Low song fame. He quit his job to pursue his successful singing career in 2017. His rap song ‘Arupu’ with Syed Kamran became popular. He was the first to do a rap song in Telugu language from Telangana State. In 2013, he debuted on Sankranthi with a single, Patang, on YouTube became a huge hit, with over 14 million views. His songs Patang, Kirana song, Dilkush are popular among young listeners. He toured USA in 2015 and 2016 to promote his Telugu rap and Hip Hop songs. Roll Rida was featured on VH1 in 2010.

He worked with Telugu music directors like M. M. Keeravani, S. S. Thaman and Anoop Rubens. He also performed with Divine. He worked as a voice artist for Akhil Akkineni in the film Manam, and Jr. NTR in Temper. He acted in a short film, Hello!, an urban rom com. It was released on YouTube. He was selected for Bigg Boss 2 for his popularity. He stayed in the house till the week before the finale of that season.

== Artistry ==
Roll Rida's rapping is a combination of Hyderabadi Telugu and Deccani slang spoken in Hyderabad old city.

== Discography ==
=== Singles/Music Videos ===
Year	Track	Lyrics	Artist
2013	Patang	Roll Rida	Roll Rida
2013	The Kirana	Roll Rida	Roll Rida
2015	Dilkush	Roll Rida	Roll Rida
2015	Kattif	Roll Rida	Roll Rida
2015	Ivvalane	Roll Rida	Roll Rida
2017	Shankar ka Beta	Roll Rida	Roll Rida
2017	Baitikochi Chuste (RAP Version)	Shree Mani	Roll Rida & Dan Madhireddy
2018	Saava Kottethadi	Roll Rida	Roll Rida
2018	O Pilla	Roll Rida	Roll Rida
2018	KTR Birthday song	Roll Rida	Roll Rida
2018	Arupu	Roll Rida	Roll Rida
2018	Raadhu	Roll Rida	Roll Rida
2020	Don't ride rude	Roll Rida	Roll Rida
2020	Nagali	Roll Rida	Roll Rida
2021	Allu Arjun Rap Song	Roll Rida, The Hyderabad Nawabs	Roll Rida & Harika Narayan S. Thaman (composer)
2021	Thaggede Le	Roll Rida	Roll Rida & Praveen Lakkaraju (composer)
2021	Chinna	Roll Rida	Roll Rida
2024	kakinada Kaja	Roll Rida & Sameera	Roll Rida & Sameera
2024	Fake Friends	Roll Rida & Manoj Juloori	Roll Rida
2024	Ready Go	Roll Rida	Roll Rida
2025	Hello Chittamma	Roll Rida & Sameera	Roll Rida

=== Film songs ===
Year	Work	Song	Composer	Notes
2015	Bruce Lee	Chiranjeevi Entry Rap	Thaman	
2015	Gopala Gopala	Pawan Kalyan Intro Rap	Anup Rubens	
2016	A Aa	"Anasuya Kosam" Rap Pieces	Mickey J. Meyer	
2018	Kumari 21F	"Lets Party in Bangkok"	Mahati Swara Sagar	
2018	Husharu	"Kaboom", "Bad Boys" (Rap portions)	Sunny M.R.	
2019	Suryakantham	"Friday Night Baby" (Rap)	Mark K Robin	
2020	Ala Vaikunthapurramloo	"OMG Daddy" Rap Pieces	Thaman	
2021	Cinema Bandi	"Cinema Teesinam"	Varun Reddy	Also lyricist
2021	Veyishubamulukaluginku	"Hey Senorita"	Gyaani	
2021	Anubhavinchu Raja	"Kaki Nemali Ke Votu"	Gopi Sundar	
2022	Hero	"Donal Daggu"	Ghibran	Also lyricist
2022	Rowdy Boys	"Date Night "	Devi Sri Prasad	Only lyricist
2022	Rowdy Boys	"Rowdy Boys Title Song"	Devi Sri Prasad	Also lyricist
2022	Bheemla Nayak	"Bheemla Back On Duty"	Thaman	Only lyricist
2022	Lucky Lakshman	"College Song"	Anup Rubens	
2023	Leo (Dubbed Version)	"Ney Ready"	Anirudh Ravichander	
2023	Leo (Dubbed Version)	"Naa Ready"	Anirudh Ravichander	
2023	Leo (Dubbed Version)	"Njan Ready"	Anirudh Ravichander	
2023	Leo (Dubbed Version)	"Ready Chal"	Anirudh Ravichander	
2023	Waltair Veerayya	"Poonakaalu Loading"	Devi Sri Prasad	
2025	War 2	"Shaitan"	Sanchit and Ankit Balhara	Hindi film; Also lyricist
2025	War 2	"Shaitan"	Sanchit and Ankit Balhara	Telugu version
2025	War 2	"Shaitan"	Sanchit and Ankit Balhara	Tamil version
2025	Chaurya Paatham	"Kanne Kaane"	Davzand	Also lyricist
2025	Bakasura Restaurant	"Bakasura"	Vikas Badisa	

=== Other songs ===
Year	Work	Song	Composer	Notes
2023	Nijam With Smita	"Episode 4 Closing Song"	Saketh Komanduri	Television talk show

== Filmography ==
- 90ML (2019) as Kishore
