= Rahul Nambiar =

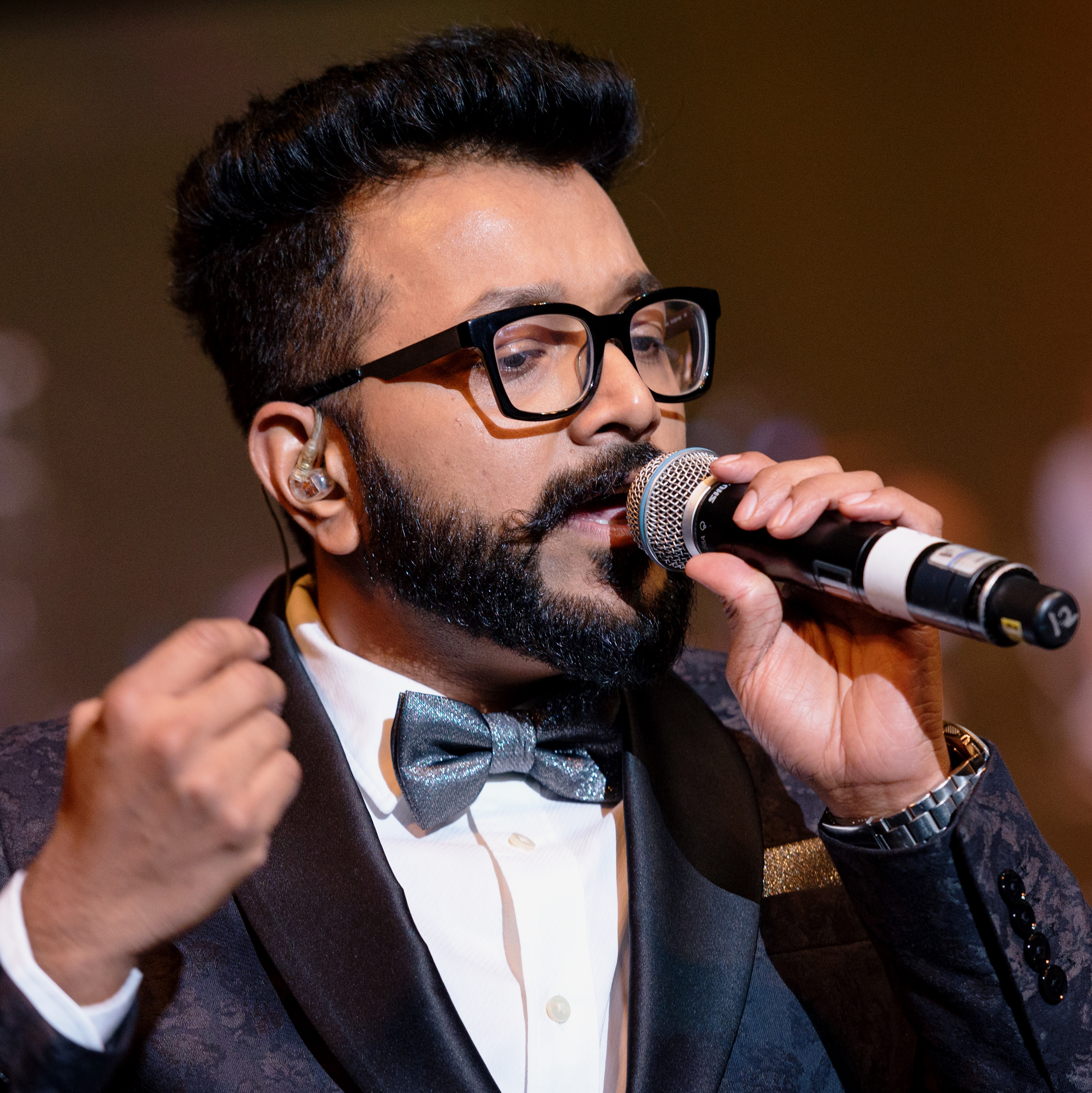
- Rahul Nambiar singing at a concert in US

Background information
- Born: Kannur, Kerala, India
- Genres: Film score, theatre, world music, pop
- Occupations: Singer, Composer, Performer
- Years active: 2006–present

Rahul Nambiar is an Indian playback singer and live performer. He won the Swapthaswarangal show in 2001 and began singing live. He sang more than 2000 songs in movies, and later ventured into playback singing, performing for many leading South Indian film composers in various languages.

== Career ==
Rahul hails from Kannur, Kerala and was brought up in Delhi and Chennai. After completing his MBA and M.Com, Rahul started working for two years in a bank, which he felt was too "monotonous", before performing at live shows with Sunitha Sarathy. In 2001, he won the Sun TV Sapthaswarangal contest, beating 3000 contestants, following which he decided to pursue a singing career. Rahul was introduced as a playback singer by Vijay Antony in the Tamil film Dishyum.

In 2009, Rahul joined hands with his longtime friend and bass player Aalap Raju to form a band named RAHLAAP. The duo released a self-titled album in Hindi language based on "Music beyond genres", on which they had worked for four years. He is considered a versatile singer, having sung in various genres such as Western, Carnatic, light music and hip-hop. Rahul has performed more than 400 live shows around India and abroad, and over 350 songs for films, most prominent ones being Mani Sharma's "Vasantha Mullai" (Pokkiri), Yuvan Shankar Raja's "Adada Mazhada" (Paiyaa) which fetched him his first Filmfare nomination for the Best Male Playback Singer Award. In 2012, he won his first Filmfare award in the Best Male Playback Singer Award category for Thaman's "Guruvaram" song (Dookudu). He has also lent his voice for several ad jingles.

Rahul Nambiar since 2019 is also part of a trio called MAKKA with his musician friends Aalap Raju and Ranjith Govind, where they perform some rocking cine and non-film songs. Their performance is an extension of their years of friendship. MAKKA has released quite a few cover songs on their YouTube channel & their own compositions like Valentine Oru Vaalu & MAKKA SONG.

== Discography ==
Year	Song	Film	Language	Notes
2006	"Bhoomikku Velicham"	Dishyum	Tamil	
2006	"City of Sins"	Thalainagaram	Tamil	
2006	"Chattuputtu"	Nenjil Jil Jil	Tamil	
2007	"Om Ennum"	Sabari	Tamil	
2007	"Maro Maro"	Chirutha	Telugu	
2007	"Vasantha Mullai"	Pokkiri	Tamil	
2007	"Valentine"	Madhumasam	Telugu	
2007	"Entha Kudirayil"	Satham Podathey	Tamil	
2007	"Mayakudirayil"	Kelkatha Shabdham (dubbed version)	Malayalam	
2007	"Pitta Pitta"	Vijetha (dubbed version)	Telugu	
2007	"Para Para Pattampoochi"	Kattradhu Thamizh	Tamil	
2007	"Yo Baby"	Malaikottai	Tamil	
2007	"Yo Baby"	Bhayya (dubbed version)	Telugu	
2007	"Kabadadharani", "Valla Valla"	Athidhi	Telugu	
2007	"Naanthana"	Ninaithaley	Tamil	
2008	"Priyatama & Dhannaley Thalley" "Maati Maatiki"	Ullasamga Utsahamga	Telugu	
2008	"Manakanna Podichey"	Parugu	Telugu	
2008	"Aa Ee Oo"	Okka Magadu	Telugu	
2008	"I Go Crazy"	Kantri	Telugu	
2008	"Chethavenna Mudha"	Dongala Bandi	Telugu	
2008	"Yuvatha Yuvatha"	Yuvatha	Telugu	
2008	"Dosthu Bada Dosthu"	Saroja	Tamil	
2008	"Dosthu Bada Dosthu"	Saroja (Dubbed version)	Telugu	
2008	"Kaalai"	Kaalai	Tamil	
2008	"Andalaney"	Pourudu	Telugu	
2008	"Nee Jimmada"	Ontari	Telugu	
2008	"Adigadigo"	Lakshmi Putrudu	Telugu	
2008	"Chidesi Chinna Pedda"	Avakai Biryani	Telugu	
2008	"Ee Ravil"	Mulla	Malayalam	
2008	"Sooriyanai"	Vellithirai	Tamil	
2009	"Narinja Pandu"	Bumper Offer	Telugu	
2009	"A Aa E Ee"	A Aa E Ee	Tamil	
2009	"College Student"	Aadatha Aattamellam	Tamil	
2009	"Thulukanam"	Balam	Tamil	
2009	"Mrogindi"	Ghatikudu (Dubbed version)	Telugu	
2009	"July Madathil"	Muthirai	Tamil	
2009	"Puththam Pudidai"	Saa Boo Three	Tamil	
2009	"Ilavayasu Pasangalathaan"	Mathiya Chennai	Tamil	
2009	"Thellavaarithey"	Mitrudu	Telugu	
2009	"Sunday Sunday"	Chickpete Sachagalu	Kannada	
2009	"Kalyana Kaaviyam"	Meipporul	Tamil	
2009	"Ela Entha Sepu"	Sasirekha Pranayam	Telugu	
2009	"Memory Lossu"	Kick	Telugu	
2009	"Bhaba Re"	Vayuputra	Kannada	
2009	"Kattikitta Rasa" "Poothadhu Poovu"	Jagan Mohini	Tamil	
2009	"Chesukunte & Poochenu"	Jagan Mohini (Dubbed version)	Telugu	
2009	"Thappu Ledu"	Bheebatsam; (Dubbed version)	Telugu	
2009	"Bhayyam"	Rechipo	Telugu	
2009	"Malli Malli"	Evaraina Epudaina	Telugu	
2009	"Adi Usha Sandhya", "Ambum Kombum"	Pazhasi Raja	Malayalam	
2009	"Adi Mudal", "Agilam Ellam"	Pazhasi Raja (Dubbed version)	Tamil	
2009	"Nuvvu Ready"	Samardhudu	Telugu	
2009	"Anjali"	Anjaneyulu	Telugu	
2009	"Katru Pudidai"	Kanden Kadhalai	Tamil	
2009	"Nuvena Nenu"	Malli Malli	Telugu	
2009	"Swapnangal"	Bhagyadevatha	Malayalam	
2010	"Oopirage Badhantey"	Brindavanam	Telugu	
2010	"Adada Mazha Da"	Paiyya	Tamil	Nominated—Filmfare Award for Best Male Playback Singer – Tamil
2010	"Arerey Vaana"	Aawara	Telugu	
2010	"Happy"	Bale Pandiya	Tamil	
2010	"Come On"	Super	Kannada	
2010	"Nangai"	Engeyum Kadhal	Tamil	
2010	"Orellella Nanna"	Porki	Kannada	
2010	"Yeppadithaan"	Maanja Velu	Tamil	
2010	"Chikku Bukku"	Chikku Bukku	Tamil	
2010	"Nee Ondrum"	Moscowin Kaveri	Tamil	
2010	"Ninnalanni"	Inkosari	Telugu	
2010	"Kuppathu Rajakal"	Kaathadi	Tamil	
2010	"Ninney Yeri"	Yuganiki Okkadu	Telugu	
2010	"Pachai Kili"	Ayyanar	Tamil	
2010	"Bhaiyyam"	Kiccha Huccha	Kannada	
2010	"Pranama Pranama"	Darling	Telugu	
2010	"Venmukilin"	Mummy & Me	Malayalam	Nominated—Filmfare Award for Best Male Playback Singer – Malayalam
2010	"Yeduraiyeh"	Happy Happy Ga	Telugu	
2011	"Poove Poove"	Singam Puli	Tamil	
2011	"Mudhal Mozhi"	Sabash Sariyana Potti	Tamil	
2011	"Casanova"	Kandaen	Tamil	
2011	"Oka Tholakari Vela"	Naa Peru Shiva	Telugu	
2011	"Guruvaram"	Dookudu	Telugu	Won—Filmfare Award for Best Male Playback Singer – Telugu; Won—SIIMA Award for Best Male Playback Singer (Telugu)
2011	"Neduvaali"	Osthe	Tamil	co-sung with Mahathi; lyrics by Yugabharathi
2011	"Osthi Maamey"	Osthe	Tamil	co-sung with Thaman S, Baba Sehgal, Ranjith, Naveen Madhan; lyrics by Vaali
2011	"Yennaidhuvo"	Mouna Guru	Tamil	
2011	"Idhayam Pesudey"	Pesu	Tamil	
2011	"Kracko Jacko"	Uyarthiru 420	Tamil	
2011	"Amruthamayi Abhayamai"	Snehaveedu	Malayalam	
2011	"Chandrabimbathin"	Snehaveedu	Malayalam	
2011	"Silaka"	Mirapakay	Telugu	
2011	"Nangai"	Engeyum Kadhal	Tamil	
2012	"Hosanna"	Bodyguard	Telugu	
2012	"Cinderella"	Endukante Premanta	Telugu	
2012	"Doodi Pinjalaanti"	Tuneega Tuneega	Telugu	
2012	"Aamchi Mumbai"	Businessman	Telugu	
2012	"Pilla Chao"	Businessman	Telugu	
2012	"Kalavu"	Aravaan	Tamil	
2012	"Paddadey Peggura"	Shakuni	Telugu	
2012	"Yaaradi Mohini"	Thaandavam	Tamil	
2012	"Yemiti"	Shiva Thaandavam (Dubbed version)	Telugu	
2012	"Aapu Birthday"	Rendavathu Padam	Tamil	
2012	"College Padam"	Naan Rajavaga Pogiren	Tamil	
2012	"Aasaiye Alaipoley", "Birthday"	Kanna Laddu Thinna Aasaiya	Tamil	
2012	"Inka Cheppale"	Seethamma Vakitlo Sirimalle Chettu	Telugu	
2012	"Laila O Laila"	Naayak	Telugu	
2013	"Nuvvala Nenela"	Priyathama Neevachata Kusalama	Telugu	
2013	"Sairo Sairo"	Baadshah	Telugu	
2013	"Yaarukkum Sollama"	All in All Azhagu Raja	Tamil	
2013	"Nadhi Vellam"	Thangameengal	Tamil	
2014	"Boochade Boochade"	Race Gurram	Telugu	
2014	"Aaja Saroja"	Aagadu	Telugu	
2014	"Choopinchandey"	Heart Attack	Telugu	
2014	"Chesededo"	Mukunda	Telugu	
2015	"O Jaane Jaana"	James Bond	Telugu	
2015	"Janda Pi Kapiraju", "Temple Song"	Kick 2	Telugu	
2016	"Mannin Makane"	Oyee	Tamil	
2016	"Bala Tripuramani"	Brahmotsavam	Telugu	
2016	"O Manasa"	Shourya	Telugu	
2016	"Endha Pakkam"	Dharma Durai	Tamil	
2016	"nammave bujji thalle"	Jaguar	Telugu	
2016	" Azhake"	Vanothan Album	Tamil	
2017	" My Love is Back"	Mahanubhavudu	Telugu	
2017	" Saarah Saarah"	Gowdru Hotel	Kannada	
2017	"Dagalti Dagalti"	Ivan Thanthiran	Tamil	
2017	"Ninna Haage"	Shivalinga	Tamil	
2018	Sunoona Sunaina	Tholi Prema	Telugu	
2018	Bar Song	Ghajinikanth	Tamil	
2019	"Naalai Namathada"	Bow Bow	Tamil	
2019	"Thadai Illai Odu"	Raatchasi	Tamil	
2020	"OMG Daddy"	Ala Vaikunthapurramuloo	Telugu	
2020	"OMG Daddy"	Angu Vaikunthapurathu (Dubbed version)	Malayalam	
2021	"Mass Biryani"	Krack	Telugu	
2021	"Mama Mama"	Kanabadutaledu	Telugu	
2021	"Odu Odu Aade"	Pushpa: The Rise – Part 1 (Dubbed version)	Malayalam	
2022	"OMG Daddy"	Ala Vaikunthapurramuloo (Dubbed version)	Hindi	
2023	"Ranjthame"	Varisu (Dubbed version)	Hindi	
2023	"Thee Thalapathy"	Varisu (Dubbed version)	Hindi	
2023	"Ranjithame"	Varisu (dubbed version)	Hindi	
2023	"Padi Padi Parugidi"	Ala Ila Ela	Telugu	
