= Samajavaragamana =

- Samajavaragamana song cover

Single by Sid Sriram

from the album Ala Vaikunthapurramuloo
- Language: Telugu
- Released: 27 September 2019
- Studio: V A Z, Visakhapatnam, India; V, Chennai; YRF, Mumbai
- Genre: Filmi; Folk-pop; Indian pop; Dance-pop
- Length: 3:48
- Label: Aditya Music
- Composer: S. Thaman
- Lyricist: Sirivennela Seetharama Sastry
- Producer: S. Thaman

Ala Vaikunthapurramuloo track listing
- 6 tracks: 1. "Samajavaragamana"; 2. "Ramuloo Ramulaa"; 3. "OMG Daddy"; 4. "Butta Bomma"; 5. "Ala Vaikunthapurramuloo"; 6. "Sitharala Sirapadu"

Sid Sriram singles chronology
"Yetu Manam Pogalam" (2020)	"Samajavaragamana" (2019)	"Nee Parichayamutho" (2020)

Music video
- "Samajavaragamana" on YouTube

"Samajavaragamana" is an Indian Telugu-language song composed by S. Thaman for the soundtrack of the 2020 action-drama film Ala Vaikunthapurramuloo sung by Sid Sriram and penned by Sirivennela Seetharama Sastry. The song's official lyrical version was released on 27 September 2019, while the full video song was released on 17 February 2020 under the music label Aditya Music. A remix version featuring Shreya Ghoshal was released on 3 June 2020, in which she collaborated with Macedonian Symphonic Orchestra.

== Release ==
A glimpse of the first single featuring Sid Sriram's voiceover, was released in all social media platforms on 25 September 2019. A minute video featuring composer S. Thaman and lyricist Sirivennela Seetharama Sastry, who penned the lyrics for the song, who shared their opinions about the song was released later in media platforms. The full song was released on 27 September 2019 and went viral within an hour of its launch. Rather than the usual lyrical video, the YouTube video had a band, including singer Sid Sriram and composer Thaman, performing the song on a flashy stage with shots of Pooja Hegde and Allu Arjun, and others, from the film.

== Music video ==
The music video version of the single was officially released on 17 February 2020 under Aditya Music label. The music video features Allu Arjun and Pooja Hegde dancing for the single. The music is choreographed by Sekhar, a well-known choreographer from Tollywood. The video garned lot of views due to its music and production.

The song was recorded at three different studios in India. The music video was filmed in November 2019 at various locations in Europe, especially in France. The single was shot at Eiffel Tower in Paris, Mont-Saint-Michel in Normandy, Lido Le Paris in Paris and in few other locations.

== Reception ==
The word Samajavaragamana and its usage is seen highly in Carnatic music. Composer S. Thaman and vocalist Sid Sriram duo produced the song with fusion of Carnatic music and other western music elements. This new-age fusion of music made the single so popular. At first Aditya Music released the unplugged version of the single which got wide popularity. Then the full video version was released, it also received good reception. The popularity of this song also created a buzz and promotion for the film's release during its post-production period.

Singer Sid Sriram once again got huge popularity who had previously sung popular Telugu song "Inkem Inkem Kavale" from the film Geetha Govindam.

== Records ==
The lyrical version of the song is the first Telugu song on YouTube to get 1 million likes and the first ever Indian lyrical music video to do so. The full video version of the song has over 203 million views and the lyrical version has over 239 million views on YouTube.

The single also topped the Telugu music charts on many music-streaming services, especially on Amazon Prime Music, Gaana, JioSaavn, Spotify etc.

== Other versions ==
Aditya Music label also produced a non-film single of the single with Shreya Ghoshal performing in Telugu language. It was released on 3 June 2020. The song was later released on 10 November 2019, in Malayalam with the same name for the film's Malayalam version, with Vijay Yesudas performing the song instead of Sid Sriram.

On 18 November 2020, Aditya Music released in the Kannada version of the song with the same name with Sanjith Hegde performing the song.

== Music credits ==
Credits adapted from Aditya Music.

- Sid Sriram – vocals
- Shreya Ghoshal – vocals
- Macedonian Symphonic Orchestra – vocals
- Sirivennela Seetharama Sastry – lyrics
- S. S. Thaman – composer, programmer
- Ramesh Vinayakam – arranger
- Sri Krishna – vocal supervisioner
- Sruthi Ranjani – additional harmony
- Mohana Sruthi – additional harmony
- Srinidhi – additional harmony
- Aditi Parnika – additional harmony
- Shadab Rayeen – mixing, mastering [at New Edge (Mumbai & New York)]
- Dhananjay – assistance mixing, assistance mastering
- Abhishek – assistance mixing, assistance mastering
- Osho V – additional live guitars, synth programming
- Siddhanth – additional live guitars, synth programming
- Shanthanu – recording engineer
- Amey Londhe – recording engineer
