= Bow Bow =

2019 Tamil film

- Poster
- Directed by: S. Pradeep Kilikar
- Written by: S. Pradeep Kilikar
- Produced by: K. Natrajan
- Starring: Master Ahaan
- Cinematography: K. Arun Prasath
- Edited by: E. Gopal; S. Anand
- Music by: Marc D. Muse; A. Denis Vallaban
- Production company: London Talkies
- Release date: 18 October 2019
- Country: India
- Language: Tamil

Bow Bow is a 2019 Indian Tamil-language film written and directed by S. Pradeep Kilikar. The film stars Master Ahaan and a labrador and the plot revolves around their relationship.

== Cast ==
- Master Ahaan as Sanju
- Labrador as Scooby
- Beagle as Popcorn
- Sultan (Stray Indie)
- V. Shiva
- Tejaswi
- Shrujai
- Sathyan
- Arokiyaraj
- Naanjil V. Rambabu
- Master P. Ravin
- Thiruppur Raj
- Charmila
- Jain
- Vijayalakshmi
- Lakshmi Priya Mathivaanan

== Production ==
Master Ahaan, from Bangalore who was then studying LKG, was cast by the director, Kilikar, felt that he "wanted someone who is fun and chirpy". Ahaan's picture was shown to him by the cinematographer. The film was shot in Chennai and Coimbatore. Bow Bow features 5 dogs, 2 of which play significant roles. Regarding the filming with Ahaan and the dogs, the director said that he "could only shoot when the dogs and the kid were in the mood to work". The film was shot in a little over a month and had dog trainers to train the dogs to show emotions. The whole unit had to work around this, but they were very cooperative. The film was only released in 2019 despite being filmed several years earlier. The film was also dubbed in Kannada in 2020.

== Music ==
The music was composed by Marc D. Muse and A. Denis Vallaban.

Track listing
No.	Title	Lyrics	Music	Singer(s)	Length
1.	"Naalai Namathada"	Muthamil	Marc D. Muse	Rahul Nambiar	4:37
2.	"Munnale"	Muthamil	Marc D. Muse	Jeffrey George Biju	4:25
3.	"Hey Kuchi Rakkamma"	Muthamil	Marc D. Muse	Haricharan, Jeffrey George Biju	4:17
4.	"Inky Pinky"	Manju, Shiva	A. Denis Vallaban	Shiva, A. Denis Vallaban, Linda, Danica, Asaph, Yogesh	5:34
5.	"Oodu Oodu"	Rahul Ghandi	A. Denis Vallaban	Madhu Balakrishnan	5:22
Total length:					24:15

== Reception ==
The film released in October 2019 to mixed reviews. A critic from The Times of India gave the film two out of five stars stating that "Though the scenes between Ahaan and the dog are decently portrayed, with cinematography and music aiding it, the dearth of appealing sequences makes it a tedious watch". Cinema Express's review noted "dog films have the power to make even the stone-hearted turn into bawling babies but Bow Bow just leaves you with a migraine".
