= Sindhanai Sei =

- Poster
- Directed by: R. Yuvan
- Written by: R. Yuvan
- Produced by: Ghilli Sekhar; Amma Rajasekhar
- Starring: R. Yuvan; Madhu Sharma
- Cinematography: Pavan Shekar
- Edited by: K. Thanikachalam
- Music by: S. Thaman
- Production companies: Green Apple Pictures; RMA Film Factory
- Release date: 31 July 2009
- Running time: 140 minutes
- Country: India
- Language: Tamil

Sindhanai Sei (transl. Think about it) is a 2009 Indian Tamil-language heist film written and directed by R. Yuvan in his directorial debut. The film stars R. Yuvan and Madhu Sharma, with Shafi, Nitish Veera, Shashank, Bala, Tharsha, and Ajay playing supporting roles. The film, produced by Ghilli Sekhar and Amma Rajasekhar, features a musical composed by S. Thaman (in his Tamil compositional debut) and was released on 31 July 2009. The film was also dubbed into Telugu as Bheebatsam (transl. Horrible). Its second half has been identified as identical to the 2007 Hindi-language film Johnny Gaddaar.

== Plot ==
The film starts with a flashback. The young man Aadhi (R. Yuvan) was disowned by his family and struggled to find a job in Chennai. He then fell in love with a rich girl named Gayathri (Madhu Sharma), and they married a month later. However, Gayathri soon humiliated Aadhi and expelled him from her home because he was apathetic, poor, and could not satisfy her sexually. Aadhi then ran into his childhood friends Pazhani (Shashank) and Seenu (Bala) at a police station. Pazhani was a naïve bank employee who had an unpleasant habit of talking for hours, which drove everyone away. The jobless Seenu stole money from bar customers to drink alcohol. They started living together and decided to make easy money by stealing gold chains and pickpocketing. Soon, they got fed up with small amounts and decided to rob a bank.

In the present, Aadhi and Seenu, both masked and armed, enter the bank, while the panic-stricken Pazhani ditches them. The two friends seize control of the bank and take the customers and employees hostage. Two of the hostages then put on their masks and shoot at Aadhi and Seenu. The police surrounds the bank and decides to catch the robbers, but the hostages are released at that moment. The police detains and questions everyone, but are unable to distinguish the identically dressed hostages from the robbers. The police find that the robbers' weapons were plastic replicas and 5 crores were missing from the bank, but no clues were left.

A flashback reveals that Aadhi had roped in two of his childhood friends, Shankar (Shafi) and Hari (Nitish Veera), who were professional bank robbers. The five friends have successfully robbed 5 crores from the bank. Since the police are on their trail, they split up and go to different towns by entrusting the job of carrying the money to a single man: Pazhani, who was not in the bank during the robbery. Meanwhile, the police inspector (Ajay) is tasked with arresting the culprits, and he finds that five people were involved in the robbery.

The five friends do not trust each other sufficiently. Shankar hires a man to steal the money bag from Pazhani, while Aadhi decides to spy on Pazhani secretly. Aadhi then steals the money bag and runs away. When Pazhani tries to catch Aadhi, a container lorry hits Pazhani, and he dies on the spot. A few days later, Aadhi returns to Seenu's home, and Seenu suspects Aadhi of double-crossing them. Aadhi has no other choice but to kill Seenu. Aadhi escapes from the crime scene and later meets with Shankar and Hari. They discover Seenu's dead body in his home and decide to bury it. Hari, who hates Shankar, suspects him of having the money bag and clashes with him, so he kidnaps Shankar's wife Dhanam (Tharsha) and sequesters her in a godown. Hari then realizes Aadhi betrayed them and threatens him to give the money bag. Aadhi takes Hari to the woods and stones him to death. Aadhi then calls Shankar with Hari's phone and threatens him to kill his wife. Shankar arrives in the woods, and Aadhi cuts his throat.

With the help of another friend (Kadhal Dhandapani), Aadhi fakes his death and deposits the money in Gayathri's bank account. The next day, Aadhi meets Gayathri in her bedroom, has sex with her, and vanishes. The police inspector arrests Gayathri and believes that Hari is still alive and was the one who killed his friends. Glad to have gotten revenge on his wife, Aadhi leaves India to settle abroad.

In the end, when Aadhi returns to retrieve the rest of the money (that he had stashed), Dhanam stabs him from behind (thinking that he was Hari), leading to his death.

== Cast ==
- R. Yuvan as Aadhi
- Madhu Sharma as Gayathri
- Shafi as Shankar
- Nitish Veera as Hari
- Shashank as Pazhani
- Bala as Seenu
- Tharsha as Dhanam
- Ajay as Police Inspector
- Mahanadi Shankar as Police Inspector
- Annadurai Kannadasan as Bank Manager
- Kadhal Dhandapani as Aadhi's friend
- Mayilsamy
- Kottai Kumar
- S. Thaman in a cameo appearance

== Production ==
R. Yuvan (Prabhu Sekhar), brother of Telugu film choreographer cum director Amma Rajasekhar, made his directorial debut with Sindhanai Sei. He is the hero of the film and has done the story, screenplay, and dialogues as well.

== Soundtrack ==
Sindhanai Sei

Soundtrack album by S. Thaman
- Released: 29 August 2008
- Recorded: 2008
- Genre: Feature film soundtrack
- Labels: Sony Music Entertainment India; Aditya Music
- Producer: S. Thaman

S. Thaman chronology
Sindhanai Sei (2008)	Kick (2009)

The film score and the soundtrack were composed by S. Thaman.

The audio of the film was released on 9 November 2008 in Chennai, with Arjun Sarja being the chief guest of the function. Boopathy Pandian, Dharani, T. Siva, Venkat Prabhu, and A. M. Rathnam attended the audio function.

Tamil Tracklist
No.	Title	Writer(s)	Singer(s)	Length
1.	"Sindhanai Sei"	Pa. Vijay	Krishnamurthy	04:01
2.	"Ellamey Ellamey"	Yugabharathi	Naveen Madhav	04:19
3.	"Mannu Nee"	R. Yuvan	Ranjith	03:19
4.	"Thappum Illai"	Yugabharathi	Rahul Nambiar	05:25
5.	"Naa Kaakinaada"	Yugabharathi	Suchitra	04:09
6.	"Uchimeedhu"	Snehan	S. Thaman	03:46
Total length:				24:59

The audio of the Telugu version was released on 7 November 2008 at Prasad Labs in Hyderabad. S. S. Rajamouli, V. V. Vinayak, K. Vijaya Bhaskar and Srihari attended the function as guests.

Telugu Tracklist
No.	Title	Writer(s)	Singer(s)	Length
1.	"Bheebatsam Idhira"	Basha Sri	Krishnamurthy	04:04
2.	"Kannire Kannire"	Kandikonda	Naveen Madhav	04:21
3.	"Mattivi"	Kandikonda	Ranjith	03:22
4.	"Thappu Ledhu"	Kandikonda	Rahul Nambiar	05:27
5.	"He Bala Bala"	Kandikonda	Suchitra	04:11
Total length:				21:25

== Release ==
The film was released on 31 July 2009 alongside four other films.

=== Critical reception ===
Upon release, the film gained mixed reviews. Pavithra Srinivasan of Rediff gave the film 3.5 out of 5 and called it a "must-watch". Bhama Devi Ravi of The Times Of India gave the film 3.5 out of 5 and said, "Having drafted a neat screenplay and a solid base for the story, the director never wavers [..] treats the film as a thriller meant to entertain, which is another whiff of freshness. Neat performances by all the actors is an added bonus". Sify said, "the movie begins with a promise but fails to maintain the momentum in the second half". For the dubbed version, Idlebrain.com rated the film 1.5 out of 5 and stated, "First half of the film is uninteresting. Second half has interesting elements, but narration is unconvincing" and concluded with, "Bheebatsam disappoints and lives up to its title".
