= Butta Bomma =

2020 song by Armaan Malik

- Butta Bomma song cover featuring actors Allu Arjun and Pooja Hegde

Single by Armaan Malik

from the album Ala Vaikunthapurramuloo
- Language: Telugu
- English title: Basket doll
- Released: 23 December 2019 (lyrical); 21 February 2020 (full video)
- Recorded: 2019
- Studio: YRF, Mumbai; V, Chennai; Prasad Labs, Hyderabad
- Genre: Filmi; Indian pop; soft-rock
- Length: 3:17
- Label: Aditya Music
- Composer: S. Thaman
- Lyricist: Ramajogayya Sastry
- Producer: S. Thaman

Armaan Malik singles chronology
"Koyilamma" (2019)	"Butta Bomma" (2019)	"Ninne Ninne" (2020)

Ala Vaikunthapurramuloo track listing
- 6 tracks: 1. "Samajavaragamana"; 2. "Ramuloo Ramulaa"; 3. "OMG Daddy"; 4. "Butta Bomma"; 5. "Ala Vaikunthapurramuloo"; 6. "Sitharala Sirapadu"

Music video
- "Butta Bomma" on YouTube

"Butta Bomma" (lit. 'Basket doll') is an Indian Telugu-language song by singer Armaan Malik and composed by S. Thaman from the 2020 soundtrack album Ala Vaikunthapurramuloo of the film of the same name. The lyrics are written by Ramajogayya Sastry. The song's lyrical version was released on 23 December 2019, while the full video song was released on 21 February 2020 under the music label Aditya Music. The music video accompanying the single was filmed at Annapurna Studios.

== Release ==
The teaser of the song was scheduled to release on 18 December 2019, but due to technical difficulties, it was released on 22 December. The song was released on 24 December 2019 (released on YouTube as a lyrical video song) as the fourth single from the album, through Aditya Music. The full video was released on 21 February 2020.

== Music video ==
The music video features Allu Arjun and Pooja Hegde dancing for the single. The music is choreographed by Jani Master, a well-known choreographer from Tollywood. The full video song was officially released on 21 February 2020 by the Aditya Music label.

In July 2020, "Butta Bomma" became the most-viewed Telugu song on YouTube of all time with 262 million views, and video crossed 700 million views in November 2021.

== Reception ==
=== Audience response ===
Upon the release of the full video version of the song, its music and the choreography by Jani Master, as well as the performance by singer Armaan Malik received positive reviews.

The song became a viral hit across the Indian subcontinent and other parts of the world. Allu Arjun's rolling step in the music video featured in short videos created by fans and uploaded to TikTok, ShareChat, and other social media platforms. Several Indian actors and singers uploaded videos where they recreated the step, as did Australian cricketer David Warner and South African-British cricketer Kevin Pietersen.

== Other versions ==
The song was later released as a single in Malayalam as "Kutti Bomma" on 6 January 2020, for the film's Malayalam version, with lyrics written by B. K. Harinarayanan, and Srikrishna Vishnubhotla singing the song. On 16 November 2020, a Kannada version of the song with lyrics by V. Manohar was released as "Putta Bombe", sung by Deepak Subrahmanyam. A reprise version featuring Anudeep Dev was released on 25 June 2020. Benny Dayal sang the Hindi version with lyrics written by Rajesh Manthan.

== Live performances ==
Armaan Malik and S. Thaman performed "Butta Bomma" live together for the first time at a special music concert for the film's promotion. It was held on 6 January 2020, at Yousufguda Police Grounds in Hyderabad. On 19 January 2020, singer Raghu Ram and S. Thaman performed "Butta Bomma" live together at the film's success meet held at Visakhapatnam. In March 2020, Malik performed the song at the Nitte Meenakshi Institute of Technology's college fest Anaadyanta.

== Accolades ==
Award (Note: Awards, festivals and organizations are in alphabetical order.)	Date of ceremony (Note: Date is linked to the article about the awards held that year, wherever possible.)	Category	Recipient(s)	Result	Ref.
Mirchi Music Awards South	5 March 2021	Viral Song of the Decade – Telugu	"Butta Bomma" by S. Thaman, Ramajogayya Sastry & Armaan Malik	Won	
South Indian International Movie Awards	19 September 2021	Best Lyricist – Telugu	Ramajogayya Sastry	Won	
South Indian International Movie Awards	19 September 2021	Best Male Playback Singer – Telugu	Armaan Malik	Won	
Cinegoers Association Awards	9 October 2021	Best Male Playback Singer	Armaan Malik	Won	
