= Ala Vaikunthapurramuloo (soundtrack) =

2020 soundtrack album by Thaman S

Single album by Thaman S
- Released: 6 January 2020
- Recorded: 2019
- Genre: Feature film soundtrack
- Length: 21:56
- Language: Telugu
- Label: Aditya Music
- Producer: Thaman S

Thaman S chronology
Prati Roju Pandage (2019)	Ala Vaikunthapurramuloo (2020)	Disco Raja (2020)
External audio
- Official Audio Jukebox on YouTube

Singles from Ala Vaikunthapurramuloo
- 1. "Samajavaragamana (Male version)" Released: 27 September 2019; 2. "Ramuloo Ramulaa" Released: 25 October 2019; 3. "OMG Daddy" Released: 21 November 2019; 4. "Butta Bomma" Released: 23 December 2019; 5. "Ala Vaikunthapurramuloo" Released: 6 January 2020; 6. "Sitharala Sirapadu" Released: 17 January 2020

Ala Vaikunthapurramuloo is the soundtrack album composed by Thaman S for the 2020 Telugu film of the same name starring Allu Arjun and Pooja Hegde in lead roles, directed by Trivikram Srinivas, the film marks Thaman's second collaboration with Trivikram after Aravinda Sametha Veera Raghava (2018) and third collaboration with Allu Arjun after Race Gurram (2014) and Sarrainodu (2016). The album consists of six songs with Sirivennela Sitaramasastri, Kasarla Shyam, Krishna Chaitanya, Ramajogayya Sastry, Kalyan Chakravarthy and Vijay Kumar Bhalla penning the lyrics. The soundtrack album released digitally on 6 January 2020 on the Aditya Music label. It is the first Indian feature film soundtrack to have more than 1 billion-views on YouTube. On YouTube's Top 10 Indian Music Videos, "Butta Bomma" and "Ramuloo Ramulaa" became the only South Indian songs that have been listed in 2020.

== Production ==
"Samajavaragamana"

A glimpse of the first single "Samajavaragamana" featuring Sid Sriram's voiceover, was released in all social media platforms on 25 September 2019. A minute video featuring composer S. Thaman and lyricist Sirivennela Seetharama Sastry, who penned the lyrics for the song, who shared their opinions about the song was released later in media platforms. The full song was released on 27 September 2019 and went viral within an hour of its launch. Rather than the usual lyrical video, the YouTube video had a band, including singer Sid Sriram and composer Thaman, performing the song on a flashy stage with shots of Pooja Hegde and Allu Arjun, and others, from the film. On 1 December 2019, it became the fastest Telugu song to 100 million views on YouTube, less than two weeks after it became the first Telugu song to hit 1 million likes on YouTube. The female version of the song sung by Shreya Ghoshal was released on 3 January 2020. The song was shot at the exotic locations across Paris, and was also shot at the Lido de Paris dance show, becoming the first South Indian film to shoot at this location. It was reported that the makers have spent more than ₹5 crore for the song shoot.

"Ramuloo Ramulaa"

The song teaser of the second single "Ramuloo Ramulaa" was released on 21 October 2019. The lyrics for the song written by Kasarla Shyam and sung by Anurag Kulkarni and Mangli Satyavati. The single was released on 25 October 2019, with the occasion of Diwali. The YouTube video included lyrics, footage of the musicians, an Allu Arjun voice-over, clips of the actual dance number from the movie, behind the scenes footage, and members of the cast wishing fans a happy Diwali at the end. In December 2019, it became the second fastest Telugu song followed by "Samajavaraagamana" to cross 100 million views.

"OMG Daddy"

The song teaser of the third single "OMG Daddy" was released on 14 November 2019, as a Children's Day treats from the team. The teaser features Allu Arha and Allu Ayaan, children of Allu Arjun. The song performed by Rahul Sipligunj, Rahul Nambiar, Roll Rida, Blaaze and Lady Kash with lyrics by Krishna Chaitanya was released on 21 November 2019.

"Butta Bomma"

The promo of the fourth single titled "Butta Bomma" written by Ramajogayya Sastry and sung by Armaan Malik was released on 22 December 2019, and the full song was released on 23 December 2019. The song "Butta Bomma" was a huge hit and went on to become the most viewed Telugu song on YouTube with over 700 million views.

== Marketing ==
In order to celebrate the success of the songs, the makers planned for a special musical concert on 6 January 2020, at Yousufguda Police Grounds in Hyderabad. Composer Thaman, singers Anurag Kulkarani, Armaan Malik, Sid Sriram, amongst others performed the songs live at the event, which saw the attendance of the film's cast and crew among other celebrities.

== Reception ==
Professional ratings
Review scores
Source	Rating
IndiaGlitz	3.75/5

The film's soundtrack album received mostly positive reviews from critics and listeners, becoming one of the biggest hits in Telugu music.

123telugu stated that "There is no denying the fact that the music album of Ala Vaikunthapuramlo is the best in recent times. Thaman is in the form of his life and churns out a blockbuster album that everyone looks forward from a big film. Every song is special and has its own charm. Very rarely does it happen that all the songs of an album click in a big way and Ala Vaikunthapuramlo is one example. The songs have taken the film’s buzz to another level and Thaman needs to be especially credited for doing a terrific job."

IndiaGlitz wrote that "This one is one of the best from Thaman and carries features of carnivalesque and soulful music. One of the most riveting coming together of singers and lyricists".

== Soundtrack listing ==
=== Original ===
The original soundtrack album featured six tracks, with five songs released as singles. The complete soundtrack album released at the film's musical concert event on 6 January 2020, and was made available in all streaming platforms. Along with the film's soundtrack, a bonus song "Sitharala Sirapadu" was released on 17 January 2020.

No.	Title	Lyrics	Singer(s)	Length
1.	"Samajavaragamana"	Sirivennela Seetharama Sastry	Sid Sriram	3:36
2.	"Ramuloo Ramulaa"	Kasarla Shyam	Anurag Kulkarni, Mangli Satyavati	4:05
3.	"OMG Daddy"	Krishna Chaitanya	Rahul Sipligunj, Roll Rida, Blaaze, Lady Kash, Rahul Nambiar	3:45
4.	"Butta Bomma"	Ramajogayya Sastry	Armaan Malik	3:17
5.	"Ala Vaikunthapurramuloo"	Kalyan Chakravarthy	Priya Sisters, Sri Krishna	3:20
6.	"Sitharala Sirapadu"	Vijay Kumar Bhalla	Soorranna, Saketh Komanduri	3:07
Total length:				21:56

Original Non-film Track List

No.	Title	Lyrics	Singer	Length
1.	"Samajavaragamana"	Sirivennela Seetharama Sastry	Shreya Ghoshal	4:07

=== Malayalam ===
The Malayalam version of "Samajavaragamana" sung by Vijay Yesudas was released as the first single on 10 November 2019. The second single "Aanddava Aanddava" (Malayalam version of "Ramuloo Ramulaa") was released on 21 December 2019. The Malayalam version of "OMG Daddy" sung by Rahul Nambiar, Nayana, Shruthi Gayatri, Blaaze was launched as the third single on 30 December 2019. The fourth single "Kutti Bomma" was released on 8 January 2020. The full soundtrack album was released on 10 January 2020.

All lyrics are written by B. K. Harinarayanan.

Angu Vaikunthapurathu (Malayalam)
No.	Title	Singer(s)	Length
1.	"Samajavaragamana"	Vijay Yesudas	3:47
2.	"Aanddava Aanddava"	Hanuman, Nayana	4:03
3.	"OMG Daddy"	Rahul Nambiar, Nayana, Shruthi Gayatri, Blaaze	3:45
4.	"Kutti Bomma"	Srikrishna Vishnubhotla	3:15
5.	"Itho Vaikundapuramallo"	Priya Sisters, Saketh Komanduri	3:14
6.	"Singarajan Sirikkanu"		3:07
Total length:			20:31

=== Tamil ===
All lyrics are written by Pa. Vijay

Vaikundapuram (Tamil)
No.	Title	Singer(s)	Length
1.	"Samajavaragamana"	D. Sathya Prakash	3:48
2.	"Rakkammo Rakkamma"	Karthik, M. M. Manasi	4:31
3.	"OMG Daddy"	Rahul Nambiar, Rita	3:47
4.	"Putta Bomma"	Karthik	3:14
5.	"Vaikundapuram"	Priya Sisters, M. L. R. Karthikeyan	2:40
6.	"Chinnavaru Sirapputhan"	V.M Mahalingam, Karthik	3:49
Total length:			20:29

=== Hindi ===
No.	Title	Lyrics	Singer(s)	Length
1.	"OMG Daddy"	RealSamPoet	Rahul Sipligunj, Roll Rida, Agsy, Rahul Nambiar	3:35
2.	"Ramuloo Ramulaa"	Raqueeb Alam	Nakash Aziz, Urmila Dhangar	4:05
3.	"Butta Bomma"	Rajesh Manthan	Benny Dayal	3:45
4.	"Jigarwala Sirf Woh"	Vaibhav Joshi	Piyush Mishra, Saketh Komanduri	3:17
5.	"Yahan Vaikunthapuram Se"	Raqueeb Alam	Urmila Dhangar, Sri Krishna	3:20
Total length:				17:41

== Background score ==
Ala Vaikunthapurramuloo

Film score by Thaman S
- Released: 27 May 2023
- Recorded: 2019
- Genre: Film score
- Length: 21:05
- Language: Telugu
- Label: Aditya Music
- Producer: Thaman S

The background score was arranged and composed by Thaman S.

Ala Vaikunthapurramuloo (Original Soundtrack)
No.	Title	Length
1.	"Swapping Babies"	1:16
2.	"Bantu Intro"	1:01
3.	"Sister Chunni Fight"	1:09
4.	"Amulya Intro"	1:29
5.	"Samajavaragamana Bgm"	1:17
6.	"Class Fight"	1:03
7.	"Bantu and Amulya Police Station"	1:03
8.	"Appala Naidu Intro"	1:10
9.	"Bantu Saving Ramachandra"	1:11
10.	"Bantu Knowing Truth"	1:00
11.	"Bantu Realising"	1:17
12.	"Valmiki's Truth"	1:06
13.	"Bantu's Freedom"	1:05
14.	"Bantu Kidnap Doctor Son"	1:02
15.	"Bantu Sacrifice"	1:10
16.	"Sad Bgm of AVPL"	1:00
17.	"Mass Entry of Bantu"	1:03
18.	"Grand Father Revealing The Truth"	1:27
19.	"Ala Vaikunthapurramuloo Theme"	1:01
Total length:		21:50
