= Ramuloo Ramulaa =

Single by Anurag Kulkarni and Mangli

from the album Ala Vaikunthapurramuloo
- Language: Telugu
- Released: 25 October 2019 (lyrical); 28 February 2020 (full video)
- Studio: YRF, Mumbai; V, Chennai
- Genre: Filmi; dance-pop; electronic
- Length: 4:05
- Label: Aditya Music
- Composer: S. Thaman
- Lyricist: Kasarla Shyam
- Producer: S. Thaman

Anurag Kulkarni singles chronology
"You Are My Heart Beat" / "Hola Hola" (2019)	"Ramuloo Ramulaa" (2020)	"O Chinna Navve Chaalu" (2020)

Mangli singles chronology
"Bullet" (2019)	"Ramuloo Ramulaa" (2020)	"Special Single on YSJ" (2020)

Ala Vaikunthapurramuloo track listing
- 6 tracks: 1. "Samajavaragamana"; 2. "Ramuloo Ramulaa"; 3. "OMG Daddy"; 4. "Butta Bomma"; 5. "Ala Vaikunthapurramuloo"; 6. "Sitharala Sirapadu"

Music video
- "Ramuloo Ramulaa" on YouTube

"Ramuloo Ramulaa" is an Indian Telugu-language song composed by S. Thaman for the soundtrack of the 2020 action-drama film Ala Vaikunthapurramuloo sung by Anurag Kulkarni and Mangli and penned by Kasarla Shyam. The song's official lyrical version was released on 25 October 2019, while the full video song was released on 28 February 2020 under the music label Aditya Music.

== Release ==
The song teaser of the second single "Ramuloo Ramulaa" was released on 21 October 2019. The lyrics for the song written by Kasarla Shyam and sung by Anurag Kulkarni and Mangli Satyavati. The single was released on 25 October 2019, with the occasion of Diwali. The YouTube video included lyrics, footage of the musicians, an Allu Arjun voice-over, clips of the actual dance number from the film, behind the scenes footage, and members of the cast wishing fans a happy Diwali at the end.

== Music video ==
The music video version of the single was officially released on 28 February 2020 under Aditya Music label. The music video features Allu Arjun and Pooja Hegde dancing for the single. The music is choreographed by Sekhar, a well-known choreographer from Tollywood.

== Reception ==
=== Audience response ===
Allu Arjun and Pooja Hegde's dance moves in the music video got wide response which is choreographed by Sekhar. Also the female vocalist of the song, Mangli got a breakthrough with this single.

== Records ==
As of November 2020, the lyrical version of the song has over 335 million (33.5 crore) views, which makes it the most-viewed lyrical song in india on YouTube, whereas the full video song has over 714 million (71.4 crore) views on YouTube. In December 2019, it became the second fastest Telugu song followed by "Samajavaraagamana" to cross 100 million views.

The single also became a chartbuster in Telugu music charts on many music-streaming services, especially on Amazon Prime Music, Gaana, JioSaavn, Spotify.

== Other versions ==
The lyrical version of the song was later released on 21 December 2019, in Malayalam with the title as "Aanddava Aanddava" for the film's Malayalam version, with Hanuman and Nayana performing the song instead of Anurag Kulkarni and Mangli. While, the full video version of "Aanddava Aanddava" song was released on 16 May 2020. Nakash Aziz and Urmila Dhangar sang the Hindi version of the song with lyrics written by Raqueeb Alam.
