= Ala Vaikunthapurramuloo =

2020 Indian film by Trivikram Srinivas

- Theatrical release poster
- Directed by: Trivikram Srinivas
- Written by: Trivikram Srinivas
- Produced by: Allu Aravind; S. Radha Krishna
- Starring: Allu Arjun; Pooja Hegde; Jayaram; Tabu; Sushanth; Nivetha Pethuraj; Murali Sharma
- Cinematography: P. S. Vinod
- Edited by: Naveen Nooli
- Music by: Thaman S
- Production companies: Geetha Arts; Haarika & Hassine Creations
- Distributed by: Geetha Arts
- Release date: 12 January 2020
- Running time: 165 minutes
- Country: India
- Language: Telugu
- Box office: est.₹262–280 crore (Note: Deccan Herald reported the worldwide gross to be ₹262 crore while The New Indian Express estimates it to be ₹280 crore.)

Ala Vaikunthapurramuloo (Note: The title of the film would be correctly transliterated as Ala Vaikunthapuramulo, or as Ala Vaikuṇṭhapuramulō (IPA: [alaː vaɪ̯kuɳʈʰapuramuloː]) in the ISO transliteration system, according to the Telugu source text. However, it was officially released as Ala Vaikunthapurramuloo and that spelling has thus entered into common use.) (transl. There in Vaikuntapuram) is a 2020 Indian Telugu-language action comedy film written and directed by Trivikram Srinivas. It was produced by Allu Aravind and S. Radha Krishna under their banners Geetha Arts and Haarika & Hassine Creations, respectively. The film stars Allu Arjun and Pooja Hegde alongside a supporting cast of Jayaram, Tabu, Sushanth, Nivetha Pethuraj, Murali Sharma, Sachin Khedekar, Samuthirakani, Navdeep, Sunil, Harsha Vardhan, and Govind Padmasoorya. It follows Bantu, a young man who endured criticism from his father his whole life. His world is turned upside down upon discovering that he was the real son of a millionaire switched at birth.

Production of the film began in April 2019, and wrapped up in December 2019. It was filmed across Hyderabad, with songs being shot overseas. The film's soundtrack was composed by Thaman S, while cinematography and editing were handled by P. S. Vinod and Naveen Nooli, respectively. After premiering in the United States on 11 January 2020, the film was released theatrically on 12 January, coinciding with Sankranti.

Ala Vaikunthapurramuloo received positive reviews, with praise for performances of the cast, Thaman's music, entertainment value, and Trivikram's writing and direction. It was commercially successful and grossed ₹262–280 crores worldwide becoming the fourth highest-grossing Telugu film of all time at the time of its release (behind the Baahubali series and Saaho), third highest-grossing film in Andhra Pradesh and Telangana (behind the Baahubali series) at the time of its release, highest-grossing Telugu film of 2020 and the second highest grossing Indian film of 2020. Thaman won the National Film Award for Best Music Direction. The film also won ten South Indian International Movie Awards including Best Film – Telugu. It also fetched the state Telangana Gaddar Film Award for Best Feature Film. A Hindi remake titled Shehzada was released on 17 February 2023.

== Plot ==
1995: Valmiki and Ramachandra start their careers as clerks in Ananth Radhakrishna's (ARK)company. Ramachandra marries ARK's daughter Yasoda "Yasu" and becomes wealthy while Valmiki remains a middle class person. On the day of the birth of both their children, Ramachandra's son appears to be stillborn. When nurse Sulochana informs Valmiki about this, he offers to exchange his baby with the dead one.

After switching the babies, the child that appeared dead starts to cry; however, Valmiki wants his son to grow up in a rich household. When Sulochana tries to switch the babies again, Valmiki tries to stop her and accidentally pushes her. Sulochana falls from the hospital building and goes into a coma with Valmiki getting a cramp that slowly turns into a limp. Valmiki's son is named Raj. Valmiki names Ramachandra's son Bantu and treats him roughly due to his true parentage.

2020: After Valmiki refuses to pay for Bantu's MBA, Bantu goes to interview for a job at a travel company headed by Amulya aka Ammu, a self-made businesswoman. After a brief scuffle and misunderstanding with the company HR Shekhar, Bantu lands the job. Eventually, Bantu develops feelings for Ammu when he, Ammu, Shekhar, and their colleague Ravindra Reddy go to Paris for a business trip, and shortly after the trip, Ammu reciprocates his feelings.

Meanwhile, Raj returns from abroad, discontinuing his MBA. Ramachandra wants Raj to toughen up so he sends him to reject Paidithalli, the son of Appala Naidu, a wealthy, powerful and influential man who offers to buy 50% of their company's shares. Ramachandra watches the deal from the hotel where Ammu and Bantu have a meeting with Sudharshanam, the investor behind Ammu's firm, who wants to buyback Ammu's travel agency. Ramachandra is disappointed by Raj's hesitance and inability to say no to Paidithalli but is proud of Bantu and Ammu for saying no to Sudharshanam. Following this, Raj is engaged with Ammu on ARK's suggestion, even though Raj is already in love with his cousin Nandini "Nandu".

Appala Naidu attempts to kill Ramachandra for refusing to sell the shares minutes before Ammu and Bantu arrive to call off the marriage. Bantu saves Ramachandra by taking him to the hospital despite several attempts by Naidu's men to stop them. There he meets Sulochana, who comes out of her coma and reveals Bantu's true parentage. She passes away right after that. The furious Bantu slaps Valmiki. Bantu then manages to enter Ramachandra's house, named "Vaikuntapuram", by blackmailing Ramachandra's doctor. ARK takes an instant liking to him.

Bantu addresses the issues plaguing the house by patching up Ramachandra's broken relationship with Yasu (which was fragile, as Ramachandra had an affair once with a woman named Revathi seven years ago), settling the dispute with Paidathalli, and reforming the corrupt family members, Sitaram and Kashiram.

At a party thrown at their house, Yasu witnesses Bantu and Ammu kissing each other. Bantu is ousted out of the house by Valmiki while Ammu's engagement with Raj is cancelled. Naidu uses the situation to his advantage by kidnapping and threatening to kill Nandu unless Ramachandra gives the shares to Paidithalli. When Valmiki begs Bantu to save Nandu, he refuses but goes anyway. He thrashes the goons, slams Paidathalli, and stabs Naidu. Later, Raj saves Nandu, thus ending his enmity with Ramachandra. Bantu and Valmiki arrive at Vaikuntapuram, where ARK slaps Valmiki and reveals that he overheard the conversation between Sulochana and Bantu right before her death. Bantu unites with his biological father, Ramachandra but asks him not to reveal the truth to Yasu, fearing she might be disheartened to know that Raj is not her real child. Unaware of this, Yasu remarks that Bantu is equal to Raj as he saved Nandu and the family, thereby giving Bantu 50% of its shares. Yasu then asks Valmiki to train Raj for five years to be as competent as Bantu and become the CEO of the company.

After arriving at Valmiki's house, Raj, feeling comfortable with his new middle class life and Bantu's old travel job, said that Valmiki, with a nurse's help, should have switched the babies 25 years ago so he could've ended up at Valmiki's house and Bantu at Ramachandra's, much to the dismay of Valmiki. The story ends with Valmiki watching hopelessly as Bantu leaves in a helicopter with Ammu.

== Cast ==
- Allu Arjun as Bantu
- Pooja Hegde as Amulya "Ammu", Bantu’s love interest
- Jayaram as Ramachandra "Ramu", Bantu's biological father and Raj's foster father
- Tabu as Yasoda "Yasu", Bantu's biological Mother and Raj's foster mother
- Sushanth as Raj Manohar
- Nivetha Pethuraj as Nandini "Nandu", Kashiram's daughter
- Murali Sharma as Valmiki, Raj's biological father and Bantu's foster father
- Sachin Khedekar as Ananth Radhakrishna "ARK", Bantu's grandfather and Raj's foster grandfather (voice dubbed by Subhalekha Sudhakar)
- Samuthirakani as Appala Naidu
- Navdeep as HR Shekhar, Bantu’s best friend & colleague
- Sunil as Sitaram, Nandini's uncle and Kashiram's brother-in-law
- Harsha Vardhan as Kashiram, Nandini's father and Sitaram's brother-in-law
- Govind Padmasoorya as Paidithalli Naidu, Appala Naidu's son (voice dubbed by Aadarsh Balakrishna)
- Rajendra Prasad as DIG Prajapati IPS (retconned character reference from Julayi)
- Rahul Ramakrishna as K. Ravindra Reddy
- Vennela Kishore as Dr. Shrinivas, Ramachandra’s doctor
- Ajay as Banginapalli Satyam, Appala Naidu's brother-in-law
- Tanikella Bharani as Anjaneya Prasad, Amulya's father
- Brahmaji as Sudharsanam, Amulya's financier
- Rohini as Lakshmi, Valmiki's wife, Bantu's foster mother and Raj's biological mother
- Easwari Rao as Nurse Sulochana
- Chammak Chandra as Chittila Murthy, a loan shark
- Hyper Aadi as Rangaraju, worker at port
- Kalyani Natarajan as Nandini's mother; Kashiram's wife and Sitaram's sister
- Sireesha Sougandh as Amulya's mother
- Kaartic Krishna Kumar as the Doctor's son (kidnapped)
- Vaishnavi Chaitanya as Sailaja, Bantu's foster sister and Valmiki's daughter
- Brahmanandam in a guest appearance in the song "Ramuloo Ramulaa"

== Production ==
=== Development ===
It was reported that, post the release of Aravinda Sametha Veera Raghava (2018), Trivikram Srinivas decided to direct a new film with Allu Arjun and that, after listening to the script, the actor had advised the filmmaker to make some changes. The idea of swapping infants was earlier attempted in Vedantam Raghavayya's Inti Guttu (1958), starring N. T. Rama Rao and Savitri.

On 31 December 2018, coinciding with New Year's Eve, the project was officially announced, thus marking the third collaboration of Trivikram and Arjun after Julayi (2012) and S/O Satyamurthy (2015). It was further reported that Allu Aravind, Arjun's father will co-produce the film under his own banner Geetha Arts, along with S. Radha Krishna's Haarika & Haasine Creations. The film was launched under the tentative title #AA19, before the title Ala Vaikunthapurramuloo, was revealed on 15 August 2019.

=== Casting ===
In mid-October 2018, reports surfaced that Kiara Advani will play the female lead opposite Allu Arjun. In January 2019, Sunil was reported to play an important role in the film. In February 2019, Pooja Hegde was reported to replace Advani, as the female lead, thus marking their collaboration with both Arjun and Trivikram, for the second time, after DJ: Duvvada Jagannadham (2017) and Aravinda Sametha Veera Raghava (2018). Veteran actress Nagma was reported to play Allu Arjun's mother in the film, although she was not approached for the role.

Followed by the success of Aravinda Sametha Veera Raghava, Trivikram hired S. Thaman, for the second time, as the film's music composer. In March 2019, it was reported that, Tabu was signed in for a significant role, marking her comeback to Telugu cinema, after Pandurangadu (2008). Nana Patekar was reported to play the antagonist role. On 8 April 2019, the lead cast and crew was announced on the occasion of Allu Arjun's birthday.

In May 2019, Ketika Sharma was reported to play the second female lead,`however, Nivetha Pethuraj was approached for the role, due to Sharma's commitments in Romantic (2019). The film's cast features Jayaram and Sushanth in pivotal roles. Kajal Aggarwal was reported to appear in an item number, but it was not confirmed by the makers. Tamil director and actor Samuthirakani was hired to play a negative role, which marked his maiden Telugu film.

=== Filming ===
The film's launch event was speculated to be held on the occasion of Valentine's Day (14 February 2019). On 13 April 2019, the film's launch was held at the office of Geetha Arts, the film's production house, with a pooja ceremony attended by the film's team.

Principal shoot of the film took place on 24 April. Followed by a brief schedule in mid-April, the team took a break, citing the weather conditions, as well as Allu Arjun and his family, went for a short holiday in Switzerland. The makers resumed the film's shoot on 24 May 2019. After wrapping the first schedule, the makers kickstarted the second schedule on 5 June 2019 in Hyderabad, with Pooja Hegde joining the sets. On 14 June, leaked stills featuring Allu Arjun as a corporate employee, went viral on social media. During this schedule the film added Nivetha Pethuraj, Tabu and Sushanth in pivotal roles.

In mid-October, the team moved to France to film the song ''Samajavaragamana''. Parts of the song was shot at Mont-Saint-Michel in Normandy, France, and the Eiffel Tower, in Paris. The song was also filmed at Lido de Paris, a world-famous cabaret theatre, and became the first South Indian film to shoot there. The makers cost up to ₹5 crore (US$520,000), for the song shoot. The team also shot the song "OMG Daddy" in parts of Europe. Later in December 2019, the makers moved to Hyderabad to shoot the song "Butta Bomma", for which a huge set was erected at the Annapurna Studios in Hyderabad. The shooting of the film was wrapped up on 28 December 2019.

== Music ==
Thaman S composed the soundtrack album and background score for the film, in his third collaboration with Allu Arjun, after Race Gurram (2014) and Sarrainodu (2016), and second collaboration with Trivikram Srinivas after Aravinda Sametha Veera Raghava (2018). The album which features six tracks, featuring lyrics written by Sirivennela Sitaramasastri, Kasarla Shyam, Krishna Chaitanya, Ramajogayya Sastry, Kalyan Chakravarthy and Vijay Kumar Bhalla, had four of the tracks being released as singles, and went viral upon release. The soundtrack album was released on 6 January 2020, and the songs were performed by Thaman and his musical crew at the AVPL Musical Concert held the very same day, at Yousufguda Police Grounds in Hyderabad. The Malayalam version of the soundtrack album were released on 10 January 2020.

It became the first Indian feature film soundtrack to have more than 1 billion-views on YouTube. The song "Butta Bomma" went on to become the most viewed Telugu song on YouTube with more than 800 million views as of January 2023. On YouTube's Top 10 Indian Music Videos, both "Butta Bomma" and "Ramuloo Ramulaa" became the only South Indian songs that have been listed in 2020.

There are 6 songs played in the boardroom scene: "Vachaadayyo Saami" from Bharat Ane Nenu (2018), "Follow Follow" from Nannaku Prematho (2016), "Undiporaadhey" from Hushaaru (2018), "Cinema Choopistha Mama" from Race Gurram (2014), "Pillaa" from Gabbar Singh (2012), and "Abbanee" from Jagadekaveerudu Athiloka Sundari (1990).

== Marketing ==
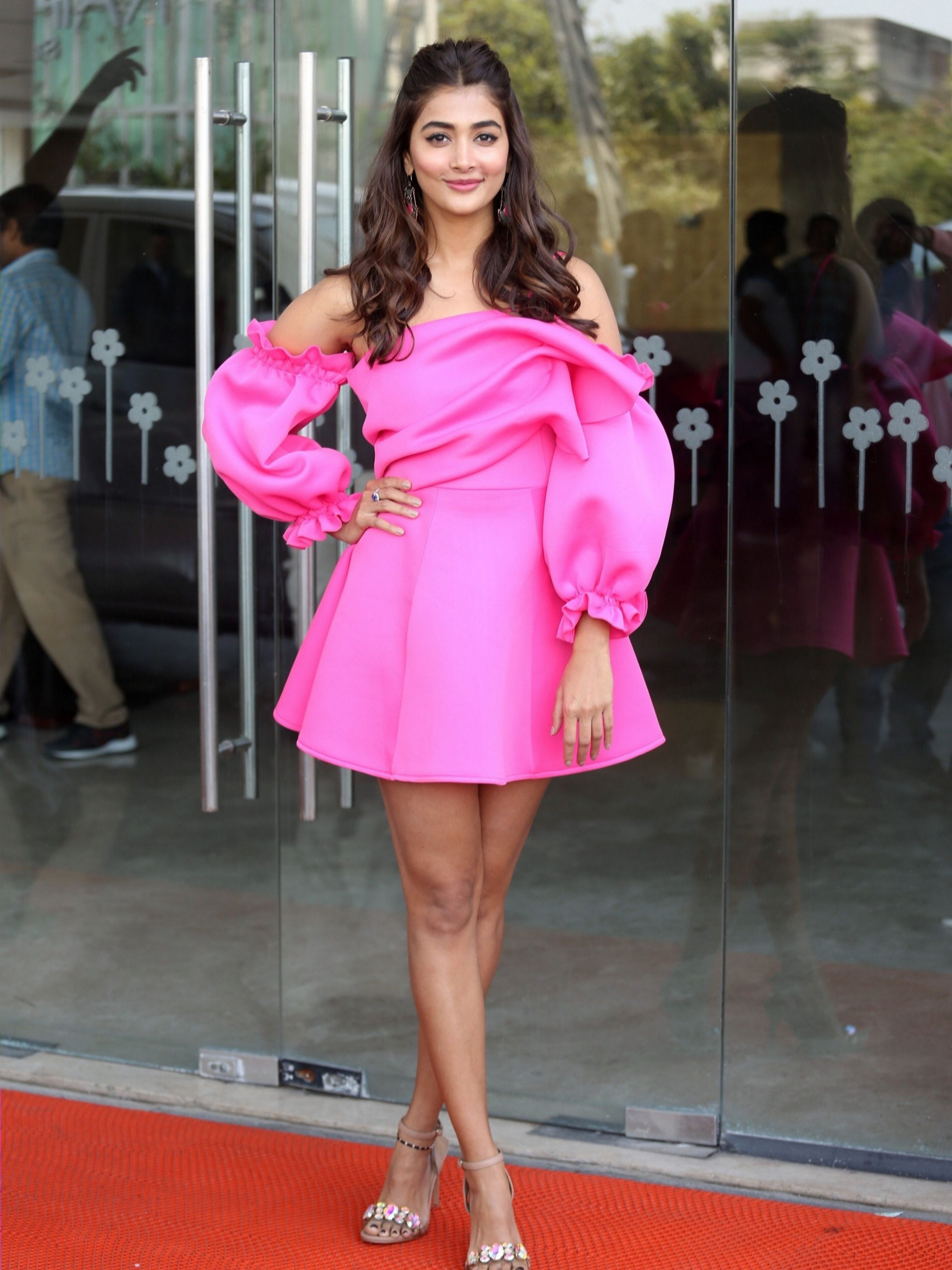
Pooja Hegde promoting Ala Vaikunthapurramuloo

On 15 August 2019, coinciding with Independence Day, the makers unveiled the first glimpse of the film, revealing its title as Ala Vaikunthapurramuloo. The film's first look poster was released on the eve of Ganesh Chathurthi, 1 September 2019. It features Allu Arjun seen sitting on a dusted stool in a businessman's suit, a security guard lights his cigar (beedi), and a shiny luxury car and a gigantic building in the background. Coinciding with the occasion of Dusshera, the makers unveiled a special poster on 7 October 2019, featuring Arjun in an action avatar.

The makers revealed a special poster featuring Pooja Hegde on her birthday, 13 October 2019. Sushanth's first look from the film was released on 21 October. Tabu's first look released on the occasion of her birthday, 4 November 2019. On Trivikram's birthday, 7 November, the makers released the first look of the film's Malayalam dubbed version Angu Vaikuntapurathu, through social media platforms. The film's official teaser was unveiled on 11 December 2019.

On 6 January 2020, the makers planned for a huge promotional event, known as AVPL Musical Concert, at the Yousufguda Police Grounds in Hyderabad. Touted to be the biggest event ever in the South Indian film industry, a stage that is 52-feet high and 162-feet wise was prepared for the event, where the makers unveiled the film's audio album and theatrical trailer. The event received great response from film buffs and audiences.

== Release ==
=== Theatrical ===
Producer Radha Krishna, on 10 July 2019, announced the film's release date through social media platforms, as the film will release on the occasion of Sankranthi. On 12 October 2019, the makers announced that the film will be released on 12 January 2020 clashing with Sarileru Neekevvaru, which falls on the Sankranthi weekend. In mid-December 2019, it was rumoured that the film will release on 10 January, earlier than the scheduled date. On 4 January 2020, the Active Telugu Film Producers Guild cleared rumours surrounding the release date and was reported that the film will be released on the scheduled date. The film was premiered at IMAX Melbourne, one of the largest cinema theatres in the world. It was also released on 11 January 2020, in the United States, a day before its official release in India. The film released along with its Malayalam dubbed version titled Angu Vaikuntapurathu while the Tamil dubbed version titled Vaikundapuram was released in 2020.

=== Pre-sale records ===
The film's theatrical rights in the Andhra Pradesh and Telangana region were sold to ₹65.96 crore (US$6.8 million), with Nizam rights for ₹20 crore (US$2.1 million), Ceded rights for ₹12.06 crore (US$1.3 million), ₹8.50 crore (US$880,000) in the Uttarandhra territories, Guntur rights for ₹6.30 crore (US$650,000), Krishna rights for ₹5 crore (US$520,000), rights in the East and West Godavari regions for ₹6.30 crore (US$650,000) and ₹5 crore (US$520,000) respectively, and Nellore rights for ₹2.80 crore (US$290,000). Karnataka theatrical rights were sold to ₹7.20 crore (US$750,000). Theatrical rights for the rest of India were sold to ₹1.50 crore (US$160,000) and overseas rights for ₹9.80 crore (US$1.0 million). The film shelled out ₹84.46 crore (US$8.8 million), in its worldwide theatrical rights. This includes print and advertising costs for ₹4 crore (US$420,000), broadcasting rights for ₹23.50 crore (US$2.4 million), Hindi dubbing rights for ₹19 crore (US$2.0 million) and other rights for ₹2.50 crore (US$260,000), totaling up to ₹133 crore (US$14 million), before the film's release.

=== Home media ===
The film's satellite and digital rights were sold only to Gemini TV. The film's digital premiere took place on Sun NXT on 27 February 2020, after 49 days of its theatrical run. The same day, the makers released the film through Netflix, with English subtitles, with the Malayalam dubbed version titled Angu Vaikunthapurathu released through the platform on 4 March 2020. The film's world television premiere took place on 16 August 2020, through Gemini TV and Gemini Movies. The Tamil dubbed version titled Vaikundapuram premiered on Sun TV. It registered a record TRP (Television Rating Point) with 29.4 rating, highest for a Telugu film ever. The Hindi dubbed version premiered on Dhinchaak TV channel (now renamed Goldmines) on 13 February 2022

== Reception ==
=== Box office ===
The film grossed ₹85 crore (US$8.8 million) worldwide on its opening day. By the end of first week, the film raked in ₹100 crore (US$10 million) domestically and also became the first Indian film in 2020 to touch $2 million gross at the United States box office. it became the first ₹200 crore (US$21 million) grosser for both Allu Arjun and Trivikram Srinivas.

According to Box Office India, the film netted ₹200 crore domestically, becoming the sixth film from southern India and the first film without Hindi version to achieve this feat. It has netted more than ₹150 crore (US$16 million) from Andhra Pradesh and Telangana alone, third film to do so following the Baahubali series. By the end of its theatrical run, the film managed to gross ₹262 crore (US$27 million)–₹280 crore (US$29 million) worldwide, becoming one of the highest-grossing Telugu films. The film earned distributors a share of ₹163.17 crore.

==== Domestic ====
The film collected ₹54 crore (US$5.6 million), during the first day of its release. Within three days, the film minted ₹100 crore (US$10 million), during the morning and matinee shows of third day. As of nine days, the film collected ₹200 crore (US$21 million). Ala Vaikunthapurramuloo grossed ₹200.85 crore in Andhra Pradesh, with ₹26.39 crore in Karnataka and ₹6.11 crore across other parts of India, thus earning ₹233.35 crore at the domestic box office.

The film earned a share of ₹132.67 crore from AP and Telangana. In the Nizam region, the film fetched a share of ₹44.8 crore, whereas in Ceded Districts the film earned ₹19.13 crore. The film earned a share of ₹10.70 crore in Guntur, ₹11.51 crore in Krishna, and ₹4.97 crore in Nellore. The film earned ₹11.60 crore and ₹9.10 crore in the East and West Godavari districts, and ₹21.90 crore in the Uttarandhra region.

==== Overseas ====
The film registered the highest opening collections of $607,000 during its premiere shows in USA on 11 January, and $607,000 on the first day of its release. The film crossed the $1 million mark in US, on the second day. Within six days, the film entered the $2 million mark in USA, thus becoming the first Indian film in 2020 to do so. It collected $3,624,759 in the overall US box office, thus becoming one of the highest grossing Telugu film in the country.

In New Zealand, the film also collected NZ$34,625 in the opening day, surpassing Baahubali 2: The Conclusion, which registered the highest opening collection of NZ$21,290 in the country. According to trade analyst Taran Adarsh, the film registered a gross of A$408,030 (₹1.99 crore) in Australia, $39,879 (₹21.68 lakh) in Canada and £91,090 (₹84.23 lakh) in the United Kingdom, as of 18 January 2020. By the following day, the film registered a gross of A$455,600 (₹2.23 crore) at Australia and £110,160 (₹1.02 crore) in the United Kingdom.

=== Critical response ===
The film received generally positive reviews, with critics praising the cast performances, soundtrack, musical score, cinematography, script and screenplay, while the predictable storyline was criticised. On the review aggregator website Rotten Tomatoes, 100% of 5 critics' reviews are positive, with an average rating of 8.50/10.

Hemanth Kumar of Firstpost gave the film 3.25 stars out of 5 and wrote "Ala Vaikunthapurramloo is both entertaining and engaging to a good extent, however, it takes plenty of time before it finds its groove. One could argue a lot about how the pace of the film could have been and if there was a better way to make a bunch of characters be more relevant to the story, but when Trivikram finishes telling the story, he leaves you with a pleasant feeling."

Neeshita Nyayapati of The Times of India gave the film 3.5 stars out of 5 stating "Ala Vaikunthapurramuloo has a bit of everything and despite the cliché and the predictable storyline. Trivikram manages to make it work and deliver what he promises. Watch this for Allu Arjun, especially if you're a fan, for he shines in this one and of course, the fun of it all." Karthik Keramalu of The Quint stated "Ala Vaikunthapurramuloo has a lot going for it because Bantu (the weirdest name for a Telugu movie hero) spends time with other characters (played by Tabu, Jayaram, Sunil, Sachin Khedekar, Vennela Kishore, Rajendra Prasad, Rahul Ramakrishna, Nivetha Pethuraj etc...) and doesn't wallow in mediocrity for a long time. And P. S., Vinod's cinematography makes each frame in the action episodes appear as avant-garde paintings. And on top of it all, the songs are an absolute treat, which makes it as an entertainer that promises fun".

Sangeetha Devi Dundoo of The Hindu called the film "an absorbing and entertaining drama presented by Trivikram – Allu Arjun duo". Manoj Kumar R of The Indian Express gave 3 out of 5 and stated "The main pleasures of Ala Vaikunthapurramuloo are not unravelling of the secrets that the characters are determined to carry to their graves. It is Trivikram's writing and his intention to tell a story and entertain the audience without any rush." Sankeerthana Verma of Film Companion reviewed "Ala Vaikunthapurramuloo is far from being perfect cinema. There are many flaws and the film takes many artistic liberties to move the story forward, but so does every other masala entertainer. But this one manages to entertain you. This one does. If a good Sankranti film is all about having a laugh and some harmless fun without having to sell your soul, this is definitely the one to go with."

Janani K of India Today, gave 3 out of 5 stars and stating "Ala Vaikunthapurramuloo is not a film that experiments. It ends up as a film that knows its flaws but packages it cleverly so that it does not weigh down on the overall experience." Karthik Kumar of Hindustan Times wrote "Ala Vaikunthapurramuloo is undoubtedly one of Trivikram's better films in recent years. While one can argue that he plays it safe by taking the tried-and-tested family template, at least he doesn't disappoint and that is laudable." Sify gave 3 out of 5 for the film stating "Ala Vaikunthapurramuloo is a well-packaged entertaining movie that has several positive points. It is a feel-good family entertainer. Despite many issues and some cliched sequences, it makes an entertaining watch during this festive period."

== Remake ==
Followed by the success of the film, a Tamil remake of the film was reported to be under confirmation, with Sivakarthikeyan reprising Arjun's role from the film, apart from acquiring the remake rights but the remake plans were dropped in favor of a Tamil dub titled Vaikundapuram. The very same month, Kartik Aaryan and Kriti Sanon were hired for the Hindi remake of the film named Shehzada for reprising the roles of Allu Arjun and Pooja Hegde respectively, helmed by Rohit Dhawan and bankrolled by Radha Krishna, the producers of the original film. The film's production commenced in October 2021 and ended in January 2023. It was released on 17 February 2023.

== Impact ==
The film received praise from celebrities, with Pawan Kalyan, Sivakarthikeyan and N. T. Rama Rao Jr. lauding Allu Arjun's performance. The song "Butta Bomma" received a positive response for Allu Arjun and Pooja Hegde's dance performance, with Shilpa Shetty and Shamita Shetty and Disha Patani eventually praising the song. In April 2020, Australian cricketer David Warner along with his wife Candice Warner, took to TikTok, to perform the hook step from the number, which went viral through social media. The song was one of the most viral songs of Telugu film industry. It gained over 800 million+ views on YouTube making it to the chartbuster category of that year's music videos.

== Accolades ==
The movie won several accolades including National Film Awards, Mirchi Music Awards South, South Indian International Movie Awards and Sakshi Excellence Awards.

Award (Note: Awards, festivals and organizations are in alphabetical order.)	Date of ceremony (Note: Date is linked to the article about the awards held that year, wherever possible.)	Category	Recipient(s)	Result	Ref.
Filmfare Awards South	9 October 2022	Best Film – Telugu	Allu Aravind, S. Radha Krishna	Nominated	
Filmfare Awards South	9 October 2022	Best Director – Telugu	Trivikram Srinivas	Nominated	
Filmfare Awards South	9 October 2022	Best Actress – Telugu	Pooja Hegde	Nominated	
Filmfare Awards South	9 October 2022	Best Supporting Actor – Telugu	Murali Sharma	Won	
Filmfare Awards South	9 October 2022	Best Supporting Actress – Telugu	Tabu	Won	
Filmfare Awards South	9 October 2022	Best Music Director – Telugu	S. Thaman	Nominated	
Filmfare Awards South	9 October 2022	Best Playback Singer – Male	Sid Sriram – (for "Samajavaragamana")	Nominated	
Filmfare Awards South	9 October 2022	Best Playback Singer – Male	Anurag Kulkarni – (for "Ramuloo Ramulaa")	Nominated	
Filmfare Awards South	9 October 2022	Best Playback Singer – Male	Armaan Malik – (for "Butta Bomma")	Nominated	
Filmfare Awards South	9 October 2022	Best Choreography	Sekhar – (for "Ramuloo Ramulaa")	Won	
National Film Awards	30 September 2022	Best Music Direction – Songs	S. Thaman	Won	
Santosham Film Awards	14 November 2021	Best Actress	Pooja Hegde	Won	
Santosham Film Awards	14 November 2021	Best Character Actor	Murali Sharma	Won	
Santosham Film Awards	14 November 2021	Best Supporting Actor	Sushanth	Won	
Mirchi Music Awards South	5 March 2021	Viral Song of the Decade – Telugu	"Butta Bomma" by S. Thaman, Ramajogayya Sastry & Armaan Malik	Won	
Sakshi Excellence Awards	17 September 2021	Most Popular Movie	Haarika & Hassine Creations, Geetha Arts	Won	
Sakshi Excellence Awards	17 September 2021	Most Popular Director	Trivikram Srinivas	Won	
Sakshi Excellence Awards	17 September 2021	Most Popular Actor	Allu Arjun	Won	
Sakshi Excellence Awards	17 September 2021	Most Popular Actress	Pooja Hegde	Won	
Sakshi Excellence Awards	17 September 2021	Most Popular Music Director	S. Thaman	Won	
Sakshi Excellence Awards	17 September 2021	Most Popular Singer – Male	Sid Sriram – (for "Samajavaragamana")	Won	
Sakshi Excellence Awards	17 September 2021	Most Popular Lyricist	Sirivennela Seetharama Sastry – (for "Samajavaragamana")	Won	
South Indian International Movie Awards	19 September 2021	Best Film – Telugu	Haarika & Hassine Creations, Geetha Arts	Won	
South Indian International Movie Awards	19 September 2021	Best Director – Telugu	Trivikram Srinivas	Won	
South Indian International Movie Awards	19 September 2021	Best Actor – Telugu	Allu Arjun	Won	
South Indian International Movie Awards	19 September 2021	Best Actress – Telugu	Pooja Hegde	Won	
South Indian International Movie Awards	19 September 2021	Best Supporting Actor – Telugu	Murali Sharma	Won	
South Indian International Movie Awards	19 September 2021	Best Supporting Actress – Telugu	Tabu	Won	
South Indian International Movie Awards	19 September 2021	Best Actor in a Negative Role – Telugu	Samuthirakani	Won	
South Indian International Movie Awards	19 September 2021	Best Comedian – Telugu	Sunil	Nominated	
South Indian International Movie Awards	19 September 2021	Best Music Director – Telugu	S. Thaman	Won	
South Indian International Movie Awards	19 September 2021	Best Lyricist – Telugu	Ramajogayya Sastry – (for "Butta Bomma")	Won	
South Indian International Movie Awards	19 September 2021	Best Male Playback Singer – Telugu	Armaan Malik – (for "Butta Bomma")	Won	
South Indian International Movie Awards	19 September 2021	Best Cinematographer – Telugu	P. S. Vinod	Nominated	

=== Film charts ===
- 7th (Top 20) – The Times of India
- 2nd (Top 7) – Karthik Keramalu, Film Companion
- 2nd (Top 6) – Manoj Kumar R, The Indian Express
- Best Indian Films of 2020 – Srivatsan S, The Hindu
