= Thaman S =

Indian film composer

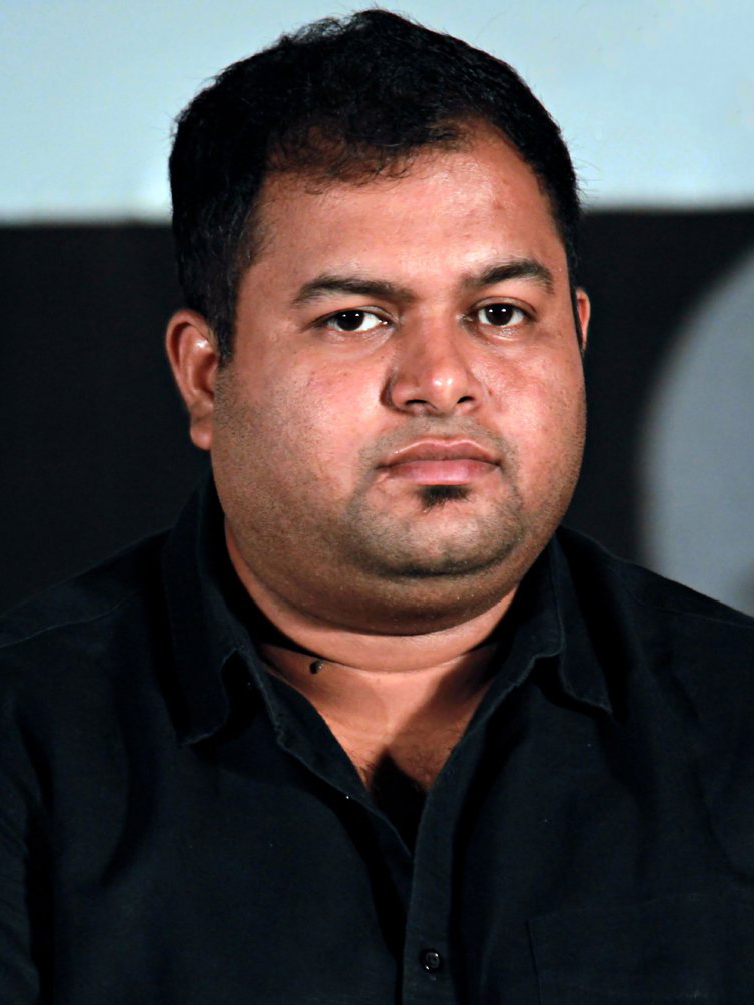
- Thaman at Damaal Dumeel Audio Launch

Background information
- Born: Ghantasala Sai Srinivas; 16 November 1983 (age 43); Nellore, Andhra Pradesh, India
- Genre: Film score
- Occupations: Music composer; drummer; judge; singer
- Instruments: Drums; rhythm pads; keyboard; trumpet
- Years active: 1994–present

Ghantasala Sai Srinivas (born 16 November 1983), professionally credited as Thaman S, is an Indian composer and playback singer known for his works majorly in Telugu and Tamil cinema. He is the recipient of the National Film Award for Best Music Direction for his work in the 2020 musical hit Ala Vaikuntapuramulo.

His breakout film as a music director was Kick (2009). His notable compositions include films such as Eeram (2009), Brindavanam (2010), Mirapakay (2011), Osthe (2011), Dookudu (2011), Businessman (2012), Naayak (2013), Baadshah (2013), Greeku Veerudu (2013), Ramayya Vasthavayya (2013), Race Gurram (2014), Aagadu (2014), Bruce Lee: The Fighter (2015), Sarrainodu (2016), Tholi Prema (2018), Ala Vaikunthapurramuloo (2020), Akhanda (2021), Sarkaru Vaari Paata (2022), Varisu (2023), and Daaku Maharaaj (2025).

Thaman has been the judge in the reality singing show Telugu Indian Idol. He is known for his frequent collaborations with Ravi Teja,Surender Reddy, Sreenu Vaitla, Trivikram Srinivas, Boyapati Srinu,Pawan Kalyan and Mahesh Babu.

== Early life ==
Thaman was born as Ghantasala Sai Srinivas in a Telugu family of musicians in Nellore, Andhra Pradesh and grew up in Chennai. He is the grandson of veteran director and producer, Ghantasala Balaramayya. His father, Ghantasala Siva Kumar, was a drummer, who worked for seven hundred films, under music director K. Chakravarthy. His mother, Ghantasala Savitri, his sister, Yamini Ghantasala, and his aunt, B. Vasantha, are all playback singers. Sai Srinivas adopted the stage name Thaman and suffixed it with an S, the initial of his father's name Sivakumar.

Thaman's father was his first teacher, who was also an accomplished drummer who worked with the likes of legendary percussionist Sivamani. Thaman entered Telugu cinema as a supporting drummer at the age of 11 when he accompanied his father for the background score for the film Bhairava Dweepam in 1994. He performed in 7000 stage shows all over the world before becoming a music director. He worked for 64 Indian music directors as a rhythm box player, keyboard programmer and drummer for 900 films before he became a film music director. His debut releases as a music director were Kick in Telugu and Sindhanai Sei in Tamil, both of which released in 2009. He made his acting debut with one of India's most celebrated directors Shankar's Boys (2003).

Thaman studied at Boston School in Chennai. He joined a music team consisting of S. P. Balasubrahmanyam and G. Anand as a rhythm pads player when he was nine years old, and discontinued studies at the age of 13 when his father died. He was compelled to make his hobby into a profession to overcome the crisis in his family. He then joined Raj–Koti and worked for three years on 60 films under their tutelage. He also worked with M. M. Keeravani for three years on 30 films.

Thaman considers Mani Sharma to be his guru and spent eight years under his tutelage, while working on 94 films with him. On the whole he put in fourteen years of rhythm and keyboard programming with the veterans before branching out on his own.

== Career ==
Thaman made his debut as a composer in through the Telugu feature film Malli Malli (2009), although the soundtrack album was released in 2008. Jeevi of Idlebrain credited Thaman's work in the film is credited as "good". The same year his second soundtrack, of the film Sindhanai Sei, marked his debut in the Tamil cinema. He has also made his playback singing debut by recording "Uchimeedhu" song from the soundtrack. Background score in the Tamil film Eeram (2009) received good reviews from the critics. Although he started composing the music of the film in 2007, the soundtrack was released in 2008 and eventually the film was released in 2009. In May 2017, Thaman made his Hindi debut when he was one of the six composers who featured in the soundtrack album of Rohit Shetty's Golmaal Again, a comedy franchise in Hindi cinema. In 2018, he composed a theme song for Rohit Shetty's successful venture Simmba.

Thaman S has established a strong presence in Telugu film music, with several of his compositions achieving hundreds of millions of views on YouTube. His popular tracks include Butta Bomma from Ala Vaikunthapurramuloo (2020), which has garnered approximately 954 million views, Kurchi Madathapetti from Guntur Kaaram (2024), with around 839 million views, and Ramuloo Ramulaa from Ala Vaikunthapurramuloo (2020), with approximately 801 million views for its full video version. Other widely viewed songs include “Tillu Anna DJ Pedithe” from DJ Tillu (2022), with around 400 million views, and Vachinde from Fidaa (2017), with approximately 385 million views. These figures highlight the enduring popularity and substantial digital reach of Thaman’s music, although YouTube view counts fluctuate over time.

== Top 5 Most Viewed Thaman S Songs on YouTube ==
| Rank | Song Name | Movie | YouTube Views |
|---|---|---|---|
| 1 | Butta Bomma | Ala Vaikunthapurramuloo | 955 Million+ |
| 2 | Kurchi Madathapetti | Guntur Kaaram | 843 Million+ |
| 3 | Ramuloo Ramulaa | Ala Vaikunthapurramuloo | 802 Million+ |

Views are approximate and subject to change.

== Personal life ==
Thaman owns music bands named Band Thamania and Gongura band. He is also a Cricket player, part of CCL and He owns a team called the Thaman Hitters.

== Filmography ==
| Year | Title | Role | Language | Notes | Ref. |
|---|---|---|---|---|---|
| 2003 | Boys | Krishna | Tamil | credited as Sai | |
| 2009 | Sindhanai Sei | Himself | Tamil | Special appearance | |
| 2010 | Ayyanar | Himself | Tamil | Special appearance | |
| 2019 | Mr. Majnu | Himself | Telugu | Special appearance in the song "Koppamga Koppamga" | |
| 2024 | Baby John | Himself | Hindi | Special appearance in the song "Nain Matakka" | |
| 2026 | Idhayam Murali | Sachin | Tamil | Also music composer | |

=== Television ===
| Year | Title | Role | Network | Language |
|---|---|---|---|---|
| 2019 | Super Singer Telugu | Judge | Star Maa | Telugu |
| 2022–present | Telugu Indian Idol | Judge | Aha | Telugu |
| 2023 | Super Singer Junior 9 | Judge | Star Vijay | Tamil |

== Accolades ==
National Film Awards

- 2022: 68th National Film Awards – Best Music Direction for Ala Vaikunthapurramuloo

South Indian International Movie Awards

- 2012: Best Music Director – Telugu for Dookudu
- 2013: Best Male Playback Singer – Telugu for "Sir Osthara" – Businessman
- 2015: Most streaming song for "Aagadu title song" – Aagadu
- 2021: Best Music Director – Telugu for Ala Vaikunthapurramuloo
- 2022: Best Male Playback Singer – Kannada for Yuvarathnaa
- 2023: Nominated – Best Music Director – Telugu for Bheemla Nayak

Filmfare Awards South

- 2012: Best Music Director – Telugu for Dookudu

Other awards

- The Hyderabad Times Film Awards 2011 – Best Music Director for Dookudu
- MAA Music Awards 2011 – Best Music Director for Dookudu
- TSR TV9 Awards 2011 – Best Music Director for Dookudu.
- TSR TV9 Awards 2016 – Best Music Director for Sarrainodu, Srirastu Subhamastu.
- GAMA Awards 2016 – Best Love song "Nuvve Nuvve" in Kick 2.
- Zee Cine Awards Telugu – Favorite Music Director for Tholi Prema.
- 17th Santosham Film Awards 2019 – Best Music Director Award for Aravinda Sametha Veera Raghava (2018).
