= Coolie (2025 film) =

2025 Indian film by Lokesh Kanagaraj

- Theatrical release poster
- Directed by: Lokesh Kanagaraj
- Screenplay by: Lokesh Kanagaraj; Chandhru Anbazhagan
- Story by: Lokesh Kanagaraj
- Produced by: Kalanithi Maran
- Starring: Rajinikanth; Nagarjuna; Soubin Shahir; Upendra; Shruti Haasan; Sathyaraj; Rachita Ram
- Cinematography: Girish Gangadharan
- Edited by: Philomin Raj
- Music by: Anirudh Ravichander
- Production company: Sun Pictures
- Release date: 14 August 2025
- Running time: 170 minutes
- Country: India
- Language: Tamil
- Budget: ₹350–400 crore
- Box office: est. ₹514–675 crore (Note: Coolie's reported worldwide grosses vary between ₹514 crore (The Hans India; Filmfare; Network18 Group) – ₹515 crore (OTTPlay) – ₹675 crore (The Indian Express; Zee News))

Coolie is a 2025 Indian Tamil-language action thriller film written and directed by Lokesh Kanagaraj and produced by Kalanithi Maran under Sun Pictures. The film features an ensemble cast including Rajinikanth, Nagarjuna Akkineni, Soubin Shahir, Upendra, Shruti Haasan, Sathyaraj, Rachita Ram with Aamir Khan and Pooja Hegde in special appearances. In the film, a former coolie union leader investigates the death of his friend which leads him to a dangerous crime syndicate.

The film was officially announced in September 2023 under the tentative title Thalaivar 171 as it is Rajinikanth's 171st film as the lead actor. The official title was announced in April 2024. Principal photography took place between July 2024 and March 2025, in locations including Chennai, Hyderabad, Visakhapatnam, Jaipur and Bangkok. The film has music composed by Anirudh Ravichander, cinematography by Girish Gangadharan and editing by Philomin Raj. Produced on a budget of 350-400 crore, it is one of the most expensive Indian films ever made

Coolie was theatrically released worldwide on 14 August 2025. The film received generally mixed reviews from critics but became a commercial success. The film emerged as the highest-grossing Tamil film of 2025, fifth highest-grossing Indian film of 2025 and fourth highest-grossing Tamil film of all time.

== Plot ==
At the Visakhapatnam harbour, Simon runs an operation trafficking gold and luxury watches under his logistics company "Kingpin Logistics" with his lieutenant Dayalan "Dayal". Simon's son, Arjun, had rejected his father's criminal business and instead works as a customs officer. Palanisamy, an undercover police officer posing as a coolie, is killed by Dayal, who then offers a ₹2 crore (equivalent to ₹2.1 crore or US$210,000 in 2026) reward for exposing another undercover officer in the gang.

In Chennai, Devaraj "Deva" runs a strict boarding house. After learning of his friend Rajasekhar's death, he attends the funeral, but Rajasekhar's daughter Preethi drives him away. A drunken friend, Ravi, admits that he and Rajasekhar ruined their lives, prompting Deva to investigate. Though the autopsy claims a heart attack, Deva finds evidence of chest trauma. Ravi reveals that Rajasekhar, to fund his daughters' education, had invented an electric chair for cremating animal remains. When his patent was rejected for concern of criminal misuse, Simon coerced him into using it to dispose of murder victims. Dayal tries to abduct Preethi as she knows how to operate the chair, but Deva intervenes and joins the operation, using the chair with her help. Deva tells Preethi to quit her job, but Preethi is helpless as she wants to support her sisters.

Eventually, Simon asks Deva to bury Dayal, claiming he was an undercover cop. They discover Dayal alive; he reveals his identity and threatens Preethi. Simon shows Deva a video of Dayal killing Rajasekhar. Dayal later contacts Deva from Nellore, demanding obedience and holding Preethi hostage in his hideout. Deva, following Dayal's orders, gains access to a harbour vault and uncovers a heart-trafficking ring targeting coolies from Saravanan. One order is to kill Arjun, but Deva spares him and asks him to run away with his lover in a boat. Dayal retaliates by threatening Preethi on a rooftop, but Deva unsettles him by revealing his real name, Dilip, and his police past as a Constable with the Kerala Police in Thrissur.

Deva then captures Dayal's wife, Kalyani, who is revealed to be actually posing as Arjun's lover, and demands Preethi's release. Kalyani frees herself, kills Ravi, and reveals that she and Dayal were undercover partners. She orders Dayal to pursue Preethi, who escapes on a train but unwittingly calls Deva using a code from Rajasekhar, revealing she is Deva's daughter. Deva's aide sacrifices himself to protect her from Dayal, who survives. Kalyani tells Dayal to go to her car, which was parked. Dayal finds Arjun there. Dayal calls up Simon and reveals that he was alive, and kills Arjun in front of him. Simon goes to Chennai and sends his men to Deva's mansion to kill off Deva and Preethi's sisters, but Deva kills off his men with the help of his lieutenant, Kaleesha, and 18 coolies who worked with Deva. On reaching Chennai, Kalyani captures Preethi but is herself kidnapped by Simon's men. Simon kills Kalyani in front of Dayal, then seizes Preethi to harvest her heart.

Deva storms the ship, revealing his past from 30 years ago as a coolie union leader in a North Indian town called Mandwa under Simon's father, Xavier, and his partner, Kakkar, who fought against their exploitation. When they tried to have 100 coolies killed to cover up their smuggling of drugs, Deva and Kaleesha led a revolt, eliminating Xavier at the cost of 70 coolies. A young Simon tried to witness his father's death, but his mother prevented him from doing so, with it becoming a traumatic event in his life. Telling Simon that Preethi is his daughter, Deva duels and kills him, and the coolies destroy the ship. Later, Deva, Kaleesha, Preethi, and her sisters are kidnapped and sent to a desert by a global syndicate leader named Dahaa, who is revealed to be Kakkar's son. After recognising Deva, Dahaa offers Deva a place as his right-hand man; Deva agrees, on the condition that his coolies are spared. Dayal is eventually captured and buried alive.

Preethi and her sisters depart abroad, forgiving Deva without knowing he is her father, calling him "uncle" in her farewell.

== Cast ==
- Rajinikanth as Devaraj "Deva"
- Nagarjuna as Simon
  - Karthikeya Dev as young Simon
- Soubin Shahir as Dayalan "Dayal" / Constable Dileep
- Upendra as Kaleesha, Deva's right-hand man
- Shruti Haasan as Preethi Rajashekar
- Sathyaraj as Rajashekar, Deva's friend and brother-in-law
- Rachita Ram as Kalyani Dileep, Dileep's wife
- Aamir Khan as Dahaa (cameo appearance)
- Pooja Hegde as Monica, the captain's daughter (special appearance)
- Kanna Ravi as Arjun, Simon's son
- Reba Monica John as Revathi Rajashekar
- Monisha Blessy as Priya Rajashekar
- Charle as Ravi
- Kaali Venkat as Palanisamy, an undercover police informant, and a coolie at Simon's harbour
- Lollu Sabha Maaran as Kumar
- Dileepan as Saravanan
- Karate Karthi as Simon's henchman
- Rishikanth as Rishi, Simon's henchman
- Ravi Raghavendra as Vikram Singh
- Ayyappa P. Sharma as Ayyappan, Simon's henchman
- Subramaniapuram Dumka Mari as Deva's aide
- Mahesh Manjrekar as Kakkar, Dahaa's father
- Baburaj as Simon's enemy
- Ajay as Xavier, Simon's father (cameo appearance)
- Tamizh as a goon
- Junior MGR as Simon's aide
- Rocky Rajesh as a coolie
- Sakthi Varma as a coolie
- Indian Bhaskar as a coolie
- Kabali Vishwanth as a Deva Mansion housemate
- Shobana as Deva's wife, Rajashekar's sister and Preethi's biological mother (photo presence)

== Production ==
=== Development ===
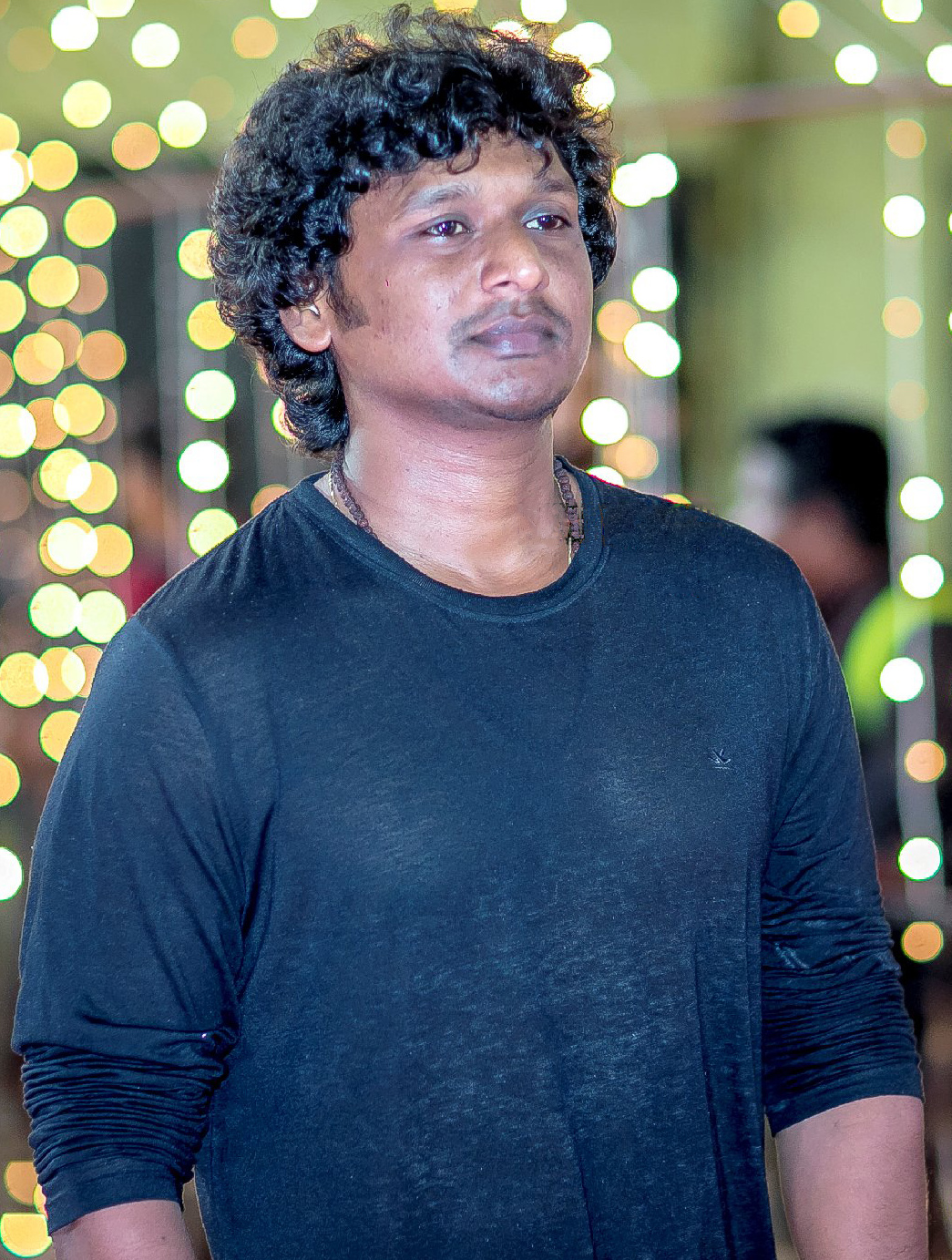
Coolie is written and directed by Lokesh Kanagaraj.

During the filming for Master in late 2019, it was reported that director Lokesh Kanagaraj had met Rajinikanth at his residence in Chennai and narrated a script that impressed the actor. According to reports, the project, which would have been Rajinikanth's 169th film, was expected to be produced by Raaj Kamal Films International, with a planned start in April 2020, but was postponed due to the COVID-19 pandemic and Rajinikanth's prior commitments to Annaatthe (2021).

Though some reports suggested that the project was shelved due to Rajinikanth's political ambitions, others said the project was still active. In August 2020, Lokesh refused to confirm or deny the project, stating that only the producers could do so. Instead, Lokesh went on to develop a film with Kamal Haasan, which materialised as Vikram (2022). Rajinikanth's 169th film ultimately became Jailer (2023), directed by Nelson Dilipkumar.

Reports of a potential collaboration between Lokesh and Rajinikanth resurfaced in April 2023, followed by a reported photoshoot with the actor in May. Actors Mysskin and Babu Antony, who had appeared in Lokesh's Leo (2023), later hinted at Lokesh and Rajinikanth's collaboration. Lokesh again refused to confirm or deny the project's existence in July, until Sun Pictures announced the film, tentatively titled Thalaivar 171, on 11 September.

The film marked Rajinikanth's fifth venture with Sun Pictures after Enthiran (2010), Petta (2019), Annaatthe and Jailer. Lokesh received ₹50 crore in remuneration for the film, double his pay for Leo, while Rajinikanth was reportedly paid ₹150 crore. The official title, Coolie, was revealed on 22 April 2024. Lokesh stated that the film was separate from the Lokesh Cinematic Universe (LCU) and would focus on gold smuggling rather than the drug-related themes of his previous films.

=== Pre-production ===
In an interaction with Baradwaj Rangan, Lokesh stated that the script was written in 2015, when he worked on the post-production of Maanagaram (2017), and was initially meant for a friend. After Rajinikanth expressed interest, Lokesh revised the screenplay in late 2023, with the first half alone taking six months to complete.

Rathna Kumar, a longtime writer collaborator of Lokesh, exited due to scheduling conflicts, and was replaced by Chandhru Anbazhagan, who reunited with Lokesh after Maanagaram. Pre-production and casting began in December 2023, and filming was expected to begin in April 2024.

Cinematographer Manoj Paramahamsa was initially attached but was later replaced by Girish Gangadharan, who had worked with Lokesh on Vikram. Anirudh Ravichander returned as composer for his fourth consecutive film with the director. Lokesh further continued to retain most of his norm crew technicians including stunt choreography duo Anbariv, editor Philomin Raj, costume designer Praveen Raja and production designer N. Sathees Kumar. Sandy Master worked as the dance choreographer. Lokesh confirmed that digital de-aging technology would be employed for flashback sequences featuring a younger Rajinikanth, following its use in Vikram (2022). Rajinikanth's younger voice was generated via artificial intelligence for these sequences.

Pre-production commenced its final phase in early April 2024, by filming and completing a promotional teaser. Although filming was originally scheduled for March 2024, it was postponed until June due to delays in set construction.

=== Casting ===
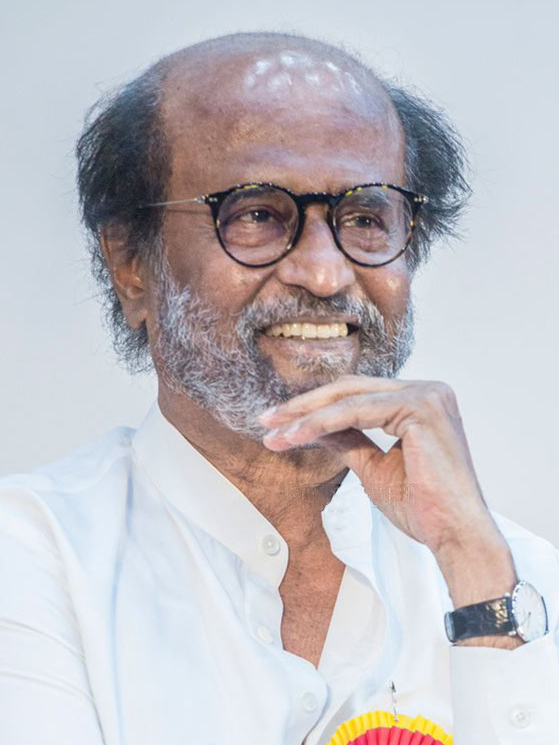
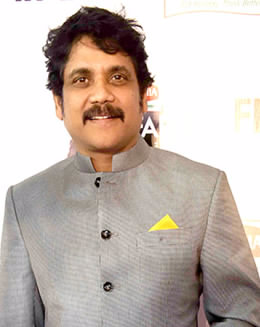
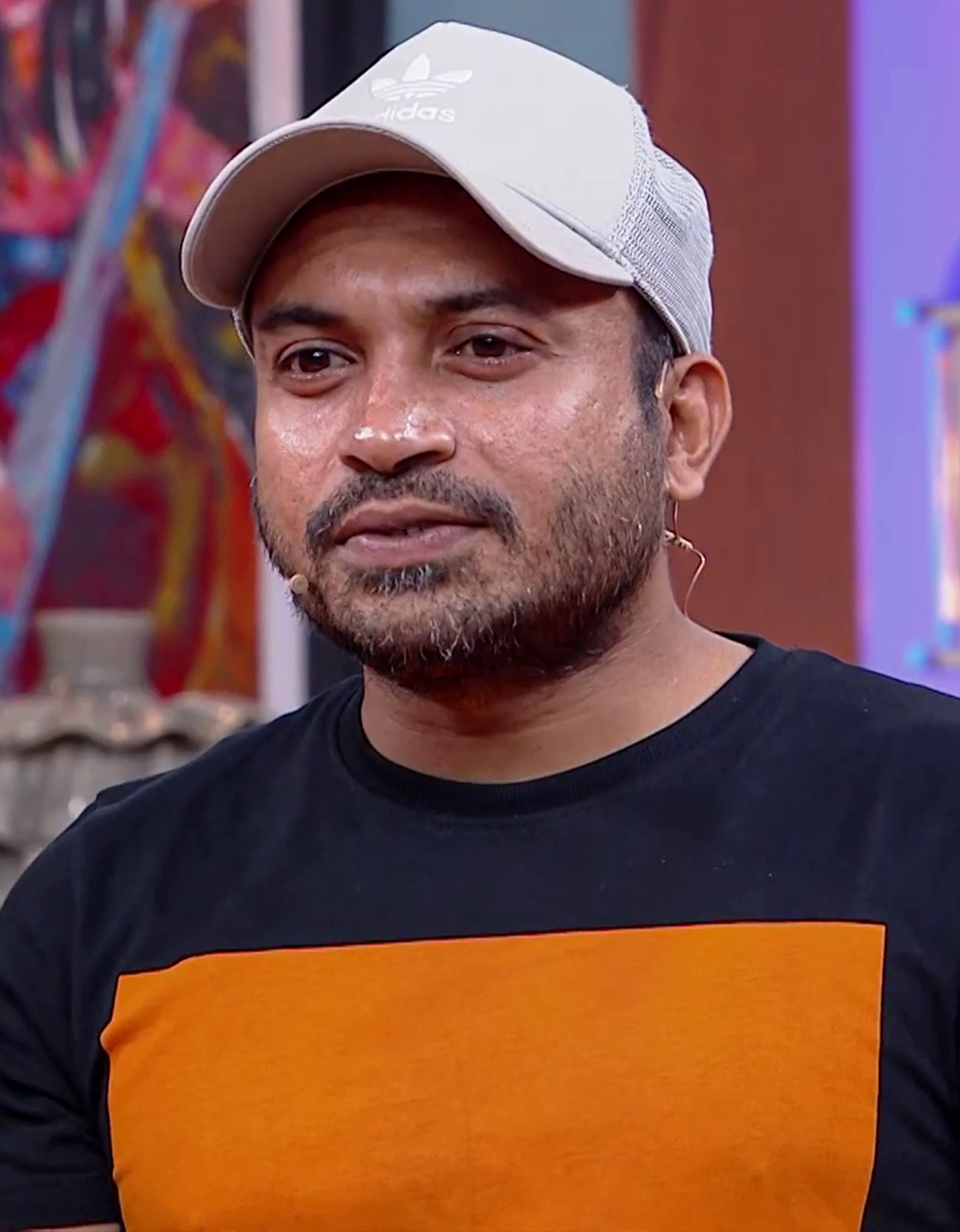
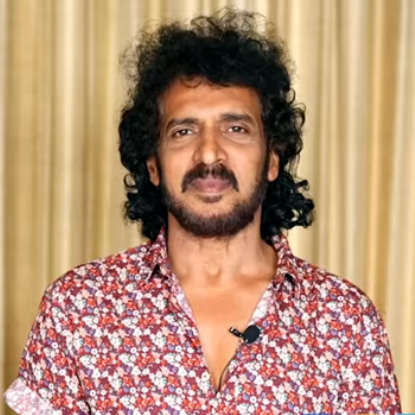
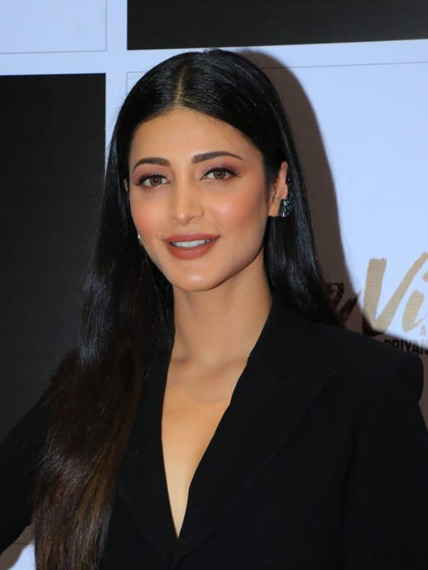
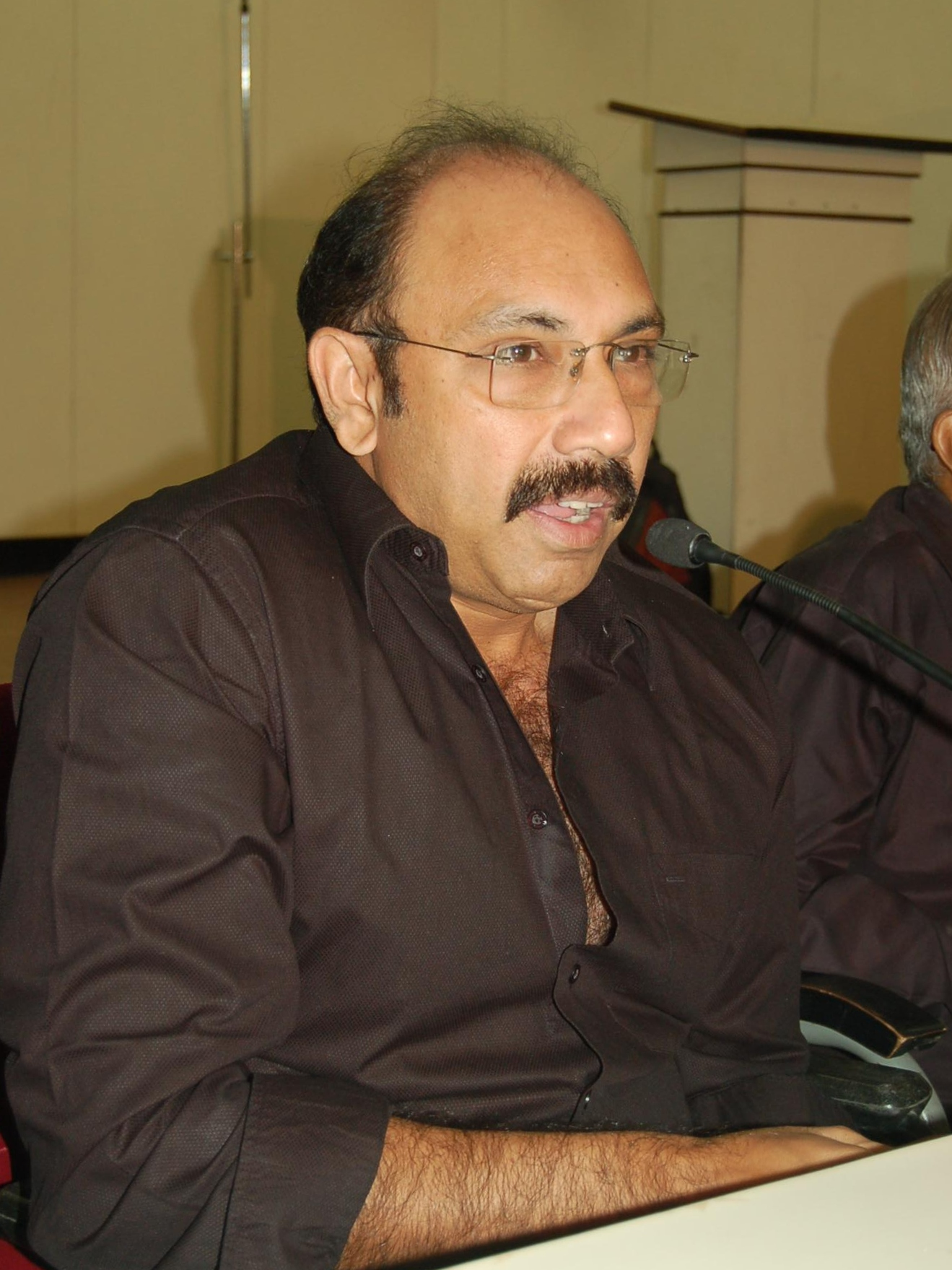
The film's primary cast—Rajinikanth, Nagarjuna Akkineni, Soubin Shahir, Upendra, Shruti Haasan and Sathyaraj.

Rajinikanth would sport a grey-shaded hairstyle and beard for his role, reminiscent of his look in Kaala (2018). Rajinikanth's coolie badge number is 5821 since Lokesh's father used that number when he worked as a coolie. Sathyaraj joined in the role of Rajasekar, reuniting with Rajinikanth after thirty-eight years, their last collaboration being Mr. Bharath (1986).

Nagarjuna Akkineni, who plays Simon, praised Lokesh's "Gen Z-style" of filmmaking and described his role as "very liberating", adding that he had no hesitation in playing an antagonist, but was finalised only after at least six meetings with Lokesh. Malayalam actor Soubin Shahir made his Tamil film debut, playing Dayal. Lokesh later revealed that this role was originally intended for Fahadh Faasil, who declined due to scheduling conflicts. Kannada actor Upendra plays Kaleesha, marking his return to Tamil cinema after a 16-year absence since Satyam (2008). Rajinikanth described Upendra's role as a cameo. Commenting on his limited role, Upendra said he was not bothered since he was more satisfied to be acting with Rajinikanth.

Shruti Haasan, who previously collaborated with Lokesh in the music video "Inimel", revealed her participation in the film via an Instagram story in July which she later deleted. Her participation was formally announced the following month. Haasan later stated that Lokesh cast her in the role of Preethi shortly after they completed work on "Inimel". The names of the actors' characters were announced by the production house through character posters released from late August 2024 to early September.

Reba Monica John participated in the Hyderabad schedule, though her involvement remained unconfirmed until early December 2024. Junior MGR, who was recommended by Kamal Haasan during the filming of Vikram, unsuccessfully tried to be part of Leo before Lokesh offered him a role in Coolie for which he shed 23 kilograms (51 lb) of weight. He joined during the Visakhapatnam schedule.

Monisha Blessy was cast after her performance in Maaveeran (2023) had impressed Lokesh. In June, Lokesh confirmed Kaali Venkat would appear. Rishikanth and Kanna Ravi's inclusion were confirmed during their presence in the film's promotional materials. Kannada actress Rachita Ram made her Tamil debut with this film. Tamizh, Charle, and Dileepan were confirmed to be part of the cast from their presence in the film's trailer.

In October 2024, reports surfaced that Aamir Khan would make a cameo appearance, reuniting with Rajinikanth after Aatank Hi Aatank (1995) and marking his debut in a South Indian production. His presence during the Jaipur schedule in December further substantiated these reports, and Upendra confirmed Khan's casting in April 2025. Khan stated that he accepted the role without reading the script, due to his admiration for Rajinikanth. A poster revealing the name of Khan's character, Dahaa, was unveiled in early July 2025. Pooja Hegde appears as the eponymous character in the dance song "Monica", paying homage to the Italian actress Monica Bellucci.

=== Filming ===
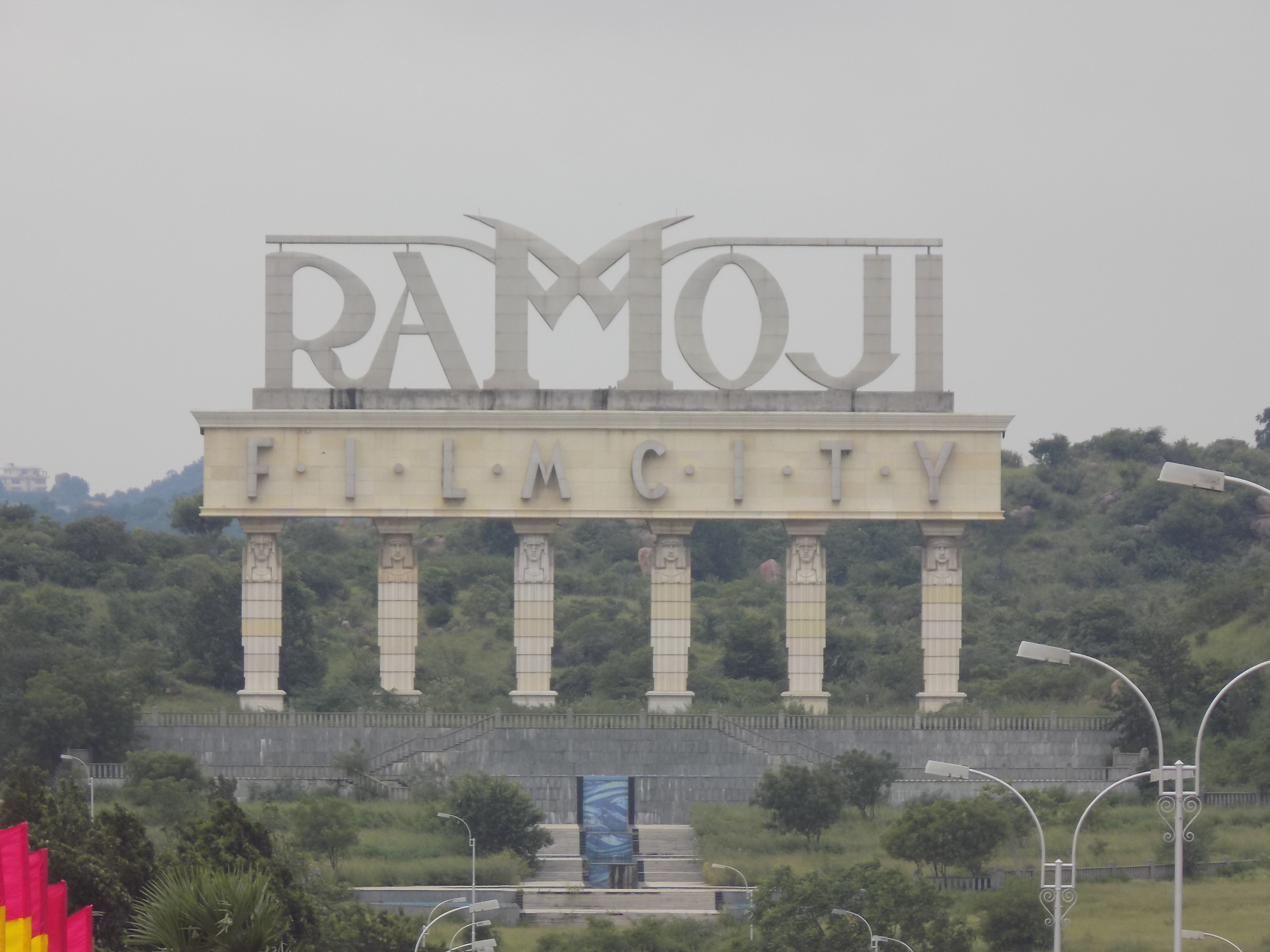
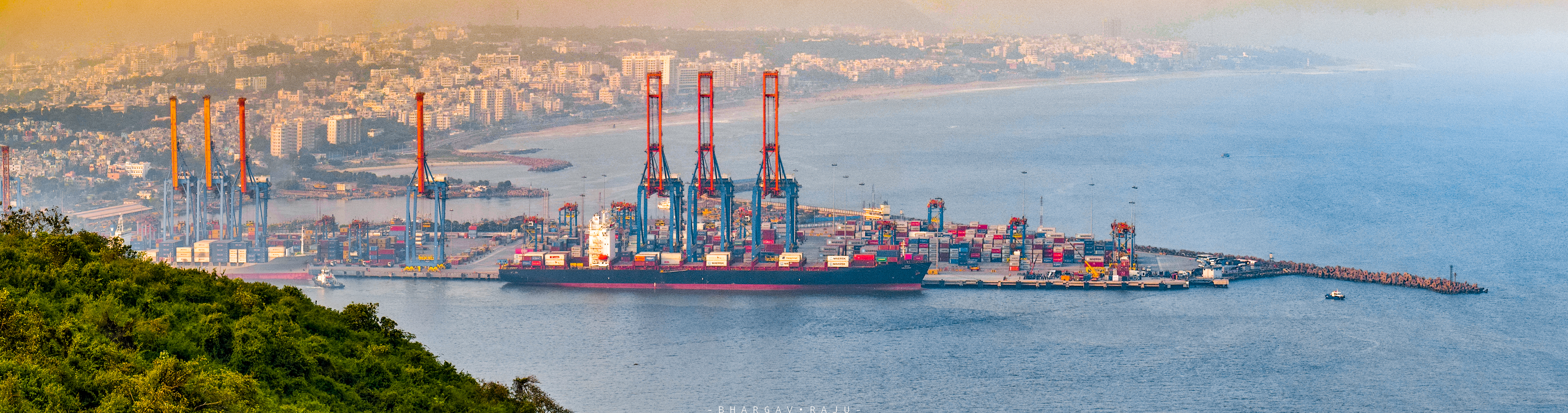
Coolie was predominantly shot in Hyderabad and Visakhapatnam.

Principal photography was initially scheduled to begin on 10 June 2024, but delays during pre-production pushed the start date. Filming ultimately commenced on 5 July at Ramoji Film City in Hyderabad, with the first schedule concluding after 12 days on 18 July.

The second schedule began in late August at Visakhapatnam in Andhra Pradesh, with major portions filmed at the Visakhapatnam Fishing Harbour, and the Visakhapatnam Port. On 14 September, a fire broke out at a container terminal near the shooting location, originating from a cargo containing lithium batteries, but the incident was resolved without any crew members injured. The following day, the cast and crew celebrated Onam on set, with footage released of the crew dancing to "Manasilaayo" from Rajinikanth's Vettaiyan (2024). During this leg, a sequence featuring Nagarjuna leaked online, prompting Lokesh to publicly request fans not to circulate the footage. This schedule concluded in early October.

Rajinikanth completed his portion of the shoot on 28 September and returned to Chennai to treat a swelling in his aorta, which was achieved two days later through non-surgical means. Though Rajinikanth was initially expected to resume filming by 16 October, he did so a week later. The subsequent schedule, which spanned nearly a month, focused on large-scale action sequences involving Rajinikanth and the principal cast.

A dedicated set was constructed at Adityaram Studios on East Coast Road in Chennai. Upon completion of the Chennai schedule, the unit shifted to Jaipur for pivotal sequences, with filming commencing on 10 December and involving Rajinikanth, Upendra and Khan. Filming in Jaipur concluded by early January 2025, at which point Rajinikanth confirmed that 70 percent of the film had been completed.

In mid-January, the production moved to Bangkok for the following schedule, and was set to take place from 13 to 28 January. As planned, the schedule concluded on 28 January 2025. Following this, the team returned to Chennai for the final phase of principal photography.

On 9 February, Lokesh directed key scenes featuring Rajinikanth and several supporting actors at the Chennai International Airport. A song sequence featuring Hegde was shot in late February, marking one of the last major set pieces. Final schedule preparations returned to Visakhapatnam and Hyderabad, with Rajinikanth finishing his portions by 10 March before moving on to work on Jailer 2. Principal photography wrapped by 17 March.

=== Post-production ===
Editor Philomin Raj, who frequently collaborates with Lokesh, edited the film. The visual effects were provided by Makuta VFX. The final sound mixing of Coolie was completed by 10 August 2025.

== Music ==
The soundtrack is composed by Anirudh Ravichander, in his fourth collaboration with Lokesh after Master, Vikram and Leo; fifth with Rajinikanth after Petta, Darbar (2020), Jailer and Vettaiyan. The audio rights were acquired by Sun Pictures's own company. The first single "Chikitu" was released on 25 June 2025, the second single, "Monica", on 11 July 2025, and the third single, "Powerhouse", on 22 July 2025. The audio launch, releasing the remaining tracks from the album, was held on 2 August 2025 at the Nehru Stadium in Chennai.

== Marketing ==
The first look poster was released on 28 March 2024, without any pre-announcement, and notably revealed that the teaser trailer would be released on 22 April. The teaser trailer also revealed the film's title. Hardika Gupta of NDTV noted that the teaser paid homage to Rajinikanth's iconic roles as a coolie in Mullum Malarum (1978), Mannan (1992) and Uzhaippali (1993), while Manoj Kumar R of OTTPlay noted the use of easter eggs from Rajinikanth's filmography, which included Rajinikanth singing "Sambo Siva Sambo" from Ninaithale Inikkum (1979), and the popular dialogue "Appavum Thaathavum", which itself is based on the lyric from the aforementioned song, from Ranga (1982). At the end of the teaser, Rajinikanth whistles the tune of the song "Shenbagame" from Enga Ooru Pattukaran (1987).

On 14 March, Lokesh's birthday, Sun Pictures released promotional stills featuring the director alongside the principal cast. The first-look image of Haasan garnered a particularly favourable response. After the song "Monica" was released in July 2025, the hook step in the music video, performed by Hegde, quickly went viral and became a social media sensation, increasing the film's anticipation. Many people recreated the dance step by recording their own dance performances to the song and sharing these videos across social media platforms. Packages sent by Amazon in India were wrapped with official posters from Coolie, becoming the first Indian film to ever do so.

The film's trailer was released on 2 August 2025. India TV noted that after the trailer's release, there were renewed discussions about an obscure 1983 Malayalam film also named Coolie which was not successful, while Firstpost wrote that the trailer was characterised by "high-voltage drama, stylized mayhem, whistle-worthy dialogues, Rajinikanth's swag, mannerism, Nagarjuna's spine-chilling villainous act, Aamir Khan's stylish and brand new avatar, and an undercurrent of rage, rebellion, and redemption". Separate posters revealing the trailer's release date were criticised by netizens for alleged lack of originality. One poster was compared to the American films Glass (2019) and Madame Web (2024) for featuring its lead characters in "fragmented glass pieces", while another was compared to Rebel Moon (2023).

== Release ==
=== Theatrical ===
Coolie was released theatrically on 14 August 2025, a day before India's Independence Day, and clashed with the Hindi film War 2. Apart from the original Tamil language, the film was also released with dubbed versions in the Telugu, Hindi and Kannada languages. The Hindi version of Coolie was initially titled Majadoor (transl. Worker); journalists believed it was to avoid confusion with the 1983 Hindi film Coolie, and other identically titled films. However, the title received criticism from fans and netizens, leading to the Hindi version being retitled Coolie: The Powerhouse.

The film's posters initially indicated that the film would have an IMAX release, despite the producers not having signed a deal with the IMAX Corporation. This plan was later cancelled due to the simultaneous release and advance booking of IMAX screens for War 2; that film's producers, Yash Raj Films, had already signed an exclusive deal with the IMAX Corporation. Coolie was also scheduled to be released in D-Box and 4DX formats, but these plans too were cancelled due to exclusive agreements with War 2.

=== Certification ===
Coolie received an A certificate (adults only rating) from the Central Board of Film Certification (CBFC), becoming the first Rajinikanth starrer since Siva (1989) to do so, and Lokesh's first A-certified film ever. While the film would initially be released uncut in India with that rating and a runtime of 169.57 minutes, the British Board of Film Classification (BBFC) classified it with a 15 rating. Later, the filmmakers added a 25-second graphic card to the final cut, paying homage to Rajinikanth's 50th year in cinema that plays in the film after the regular Rajinikanth title card, and submitted it to the CBFC again. This time they made visual and audible changes but no length reduction, making the final runtime 170.22 minutes. In Singapore, the film received a PG-13 rating after 4 minutes were cut, one week after the uncut NC-16 version (restricted to viewers aged 16 and over) premiered in the country.

The film's certification in India became the subject of scrutiny, with some feeling it was improperly certified as there were other films with more violence but not certified A. while others felt it could be due to new CBFC rules. Subsequently, the parent company of Sun Pictures, Sun TV Network appealed to the Madras High Court, seeking to attain a U/A certificate (parental guidance) instead. They alleged that the CBFC shocked them by giving the film an A certificate due to it "celebrating violence", but Sun TV Network could not contest this as bookings for the film had already opened worldwide, and believed it could be re-certified post-release. During the first court hearing held on 20 August, the CBFC retorted that the producers refused to make cuts and accepted the A certificate, although they could have been granted U/A had the suggested cuts been made. On 25 August, the CBFC defended its decision to give the film an A certificate, stating that both the examining committee, which included a CBFC officer and four outside experts, and the revising committee unanimously agreed that the film's violent scenes made it suitable only for adults, hence the A certificate. The court subsequently dismissed Sun TV Network's appeal. Lokesh later revealed that the scenes of burning of bodies may have been unsettling and the CBFC suggested 35 cuts if the makers wanted U/A, but the makers opted for A to avoid compromising on quality.

=== Distribution ===
==== India ====
Asian Multiplexes Private Limited bought the distribution rights for the Telugu states for ₹53 crore (US$5.5 million). AV Media Consultancy acquired the rights for Karnataka, Pen Marudhar for North India, and Haasan Meenu Associates for Kerala.

==== Overseas ====
Hamsini Entertainment bought the overseas distribution rights, reportedly for ₹68 crore (US$7.1 million), and are reportedly intending to release the film across 100 countries. Distributing the film by themselves in Switzerland, the company will also distribute the film in the United Kingdom, along with Lights On Entertainment. They sold the rights to Prathyangira Cinemas for North America, Malik Streams Corporation for Malaysia, Phars Films for the Middle East, Home Screen Entertainment for Singapore, Linus Media for the Netherlands, Belgium and Luxembourg, Tolly Movies for Australia, New Zealand, and Papua New Guinea, Shree Byankatesh Entertainment for Nepal, AKS Entertainment for Ireland, Indeser Entertainment for Malta, Black Ticket Entertainment for Georgia, and Dakshin Films for Hungary.

=== Pre-bookings ===
Advance ticket sales began internationally on 22 July, with pre-sale tickets worth ₹15 lakh (US$16,000) sold within minutes in the United States alone. Within a few days, over 10,000 tickets were sold across 438 shows in North America. By 25 July, pre-sales revenue in international markets had crossed ₹2.5 crore (US$260,000), increasing to ₹4.2 crore (US$440,000) within three days. As of 31 July, pre-sales reached ₹5.9 crore (US$610,000), with trade analysts forecasting earnings above ₹8.5 crore (US$880,000), a target surpassed following the release of the film's trailer on 2 August. Eventually, the film crossed the US$2,000,000 mark.

=== Home media ===
The post-theatrical streaming rights of Coolie were acquired by Amazon Prime Video for ₹110 crore (US$11 million). Sun TV Network holds the film's satellite rights. The film began streaming on Amazon Prime Video from 11 September 2025 in Tamil and dubbed versions of Telugu, Malayalam and Kannada languages. The Hindi version began streaming on the platform from 9 October 2025.

== Reception ==
=== Critical response ===
Coolie received mixed reviews from critics. On the review aggregator website Rotten Tomatoes, 63% of 8 critics' reviews are positive, with an average rating of 5.5/10.

Himanshi Tiwari of India TV gave 3.5/5 stars and wrote "Lokesh Kanagaraj, famous for his action films, has once again impressed the audience with the star cast, story and dialogues of this film." S Viswanath of Deccan Herald gave 3.5/5 stars and wrote "By making ‘Coolie’ bloody and gory, Lokesh Kanagaraj has elevated villainy and violence to its full brutal form. While Rajinikanth lives and walks through his fan-pleasing role, the others play second fiddle to elevate his charisma and screen presence." Rachit Gupta of Filmfare gave 3.5/5 stars and wrote "Coolie does really create a pocket universe of coolness and pulls off the fan service with elan. It's not the best dramatic story you've ever seen. But the moments that unfold on screen are truly entertaining."

Sridevi S of The Times of India gave 3.5/5 stars and wrote "Coolie emerges as one of Rajinikanth's most electrifying outings in recent years, surpassing his previous films in sheer energy and style". Bollywood Hungama gave 3/5 stars and wrote "On the whole, Coolie has ample mass moments and swag of Rajinikanth. However, the unexciting writing in places act as impediment." Arjun Menon of The Indian Express gave 2.5/5 stars and wrote "Coolie is as much a Rajinikanth film as it is a showcase of the much-celebrated young director’s weakest impulses as an image maker." Saibal Chatterjee of NDTV gave 3/5 stars and wrote "It is Rajinikanth the star and Deva the character who call the shots all the way through."

Abhimanyu Mathur of Hindustan Times gave 2.5/5 stars and wrote "Lokesh Kanagaraj and Rajinikanth's combination gives an entertaining, but uneven film that could have been so much more." Anusha Sundar of OTT Play gave 2/5 stars and wrote "Apart from a few interesting pockets of writing, Coolie gets a disjointed narration and a much lesser adrenaline rush to make you enjoy." Avinash Ramachandran of Cinema Express gave 2/5 stars and wrote "Once again, this blow-hot-blow-cold treatment proves to be the undoing of Coolie, which needed more emotional heft if it wanted to be taken seriously as an action drama. Unfortunately, Coolie is burdened by the weight of its own expectations."

Janani K of India Today gave 2/5 stars and wrote "Keeping Rajinikanth's charm aside, the film hardly offers anything new or substantial." Bhuvanesh Chandar of The Hindu wrote "Coolie, on paper, must have had the promised potential. It’s a grounded crime action drama with Rajini moments to keep it going. But if Lokesh’s previous films — like Kaithi, Master, and Vikram — say something that it is that a strong emotional core is the necessary ingredient to make a realistically-shot action drama feel real and present, and this core is what is missing in Coolie." NP Jayaraman of Deccan Herald wrote "While some moments, especially Rajinikanth's performance, will give audiences goosebumps, the storyline falls flat, making the movie a tedious watch." Rajagopalan Venkataraman of Khaleej Times gave 2.5/5 and wrote "Watch Coolie, but prepare for moments of excitement and disappointment in equal measure. Dinesh Kumar Maganathan of Free Malaysia Today wrote, "Coolie stands tall as a celebration of Rajinikanth's golden jubilee in cinema – an entertaining blend of old-school mass moments and modern, layered storytelling".

=== Box office ===
Coolie grossed ₹150 crore (US$16 million) worldwide on its opening day, which was the highest first day gross for a Tamil film. The film crossed ₹250 crore (US$26 million) in two days. The film grossed over ₹320 crore (US$33 million) in three days. The film crossed ₹400 crore (US$42 million) in four days. The film grossed over ₹432 crore (US$45 million) in seven days. The film grossed over ₹457 crore (US$47 million) in nine days. The film crossed ₹500 crore (US$52 million) in two weeks. The film crossed ₹600 crore (US$62 million) in its third week. By the end of its theatrical run on 10 September, it had grossed approximately ₹514–675 crore worldwide.

== Legal issues ==
A week after the teaser's release, composer Ilaiyaraaja sent a notice to the makers for using the song "Vaa Vaa Pakkam Vaa" from Thanga Magan (1983) in the teaser without his permission. Calling it an offence under the Copyright Act of 1957, he demanded the makers attain proper permission or remove the track from the teaser. Rajinikanth, when questioned about the issue, stated that it was only between Ilaiyaraaja and the film's producer, Kalanithi Maran. However, according to critic Sathish Kumar, Ilaiyaraaja does not hold the copyright to the song as Echo, the record label of the song, had their entire catalogue acquired by Sony Music South who later sold this song's rights to Sun Pictures. During a hearing in the Madras High Court in late April, the judge stated Ilaiyaraaja could not claim exclusive ownership over the song, as the lyrics were written by a different person.

== Future ==
Before the film's release, Lokesh said he had no intentions of making a sequel to Coolie, explaining that while he is open for another collaboration with Rajinikanth for a different project, Coolie remains a standalone film with a definitive ending. However, Anirudh expressed his hopes for a sequel and shared that the film's team hopes for the same. Aamir Khan, in response to rumours of him doing a sequel, refuted such claims, revealing that he was instead doing a separate film with Lokesh directing.
