= Gnanavel =

Gnanavel is an Indian surname. Notable people with the surname include:

- K. E. Gnanavel Raja (born 1986), Indian film producer
- T. J. Gnanavel (fl. 2010), Indian film director and screenwriter
