= S. R. Kathir =

Indian cinematographer (born 1978)

- Born: Coimbatore, Tamil Nadu, India
- Occupation: Director of photography
- Awards: Vijay Awards 2009 Ananda Vikatan Cinema Awards 2016 Boston International Film Festival 2022

S. R. Kathir is an Indian cinematographer in the Tamil film industry. He is a member of the ISC. He is known for his collaborations with M. Sasikumar, Samuthirakani, and Gautham Vasudev Menon.

== Career ==
Kathir has worked on films including Kattradhu Thamizh (2007), Subramaniapuram (2008) and Naadodigal (2009), often collaborating in ventures by directors Sasikumar, Samuthirakani, and Gautham Menon.

== Filmography ==
- All films are in Tamil, unless mentioned otherwise.

Year	Film	Notes
2007	Kattradhu Thamizh	
2008	Subramaniapuram	
2009	Naadodigal	
2010	Shambo Shiva Shambo	Telugu film; Debut in Telugu cinema
2010	Easan	
2011	Poraali	
2012	Neethane En Ponvasantham; Yeto Vellipoyindhi Manasu	Bilingual film in Tamil and Telugu; Additional cinematography
2014	Oru Kanniyum Moonu Kalavaanikalum	
2015	Yennai Arindhaal	Additional cinematography
2015	Rajathandhiram	
2016	Vetrivel	
2016	Lens	Bilingual film
2016	Kidaari	
2017	Kodiveeran	
2018	Asuravadham	
2019	Queen	Bilingual in Tamil and English; Television series on MX Player
2021	Jai Bhim	
2021	Kasada Tabara	Streaming release; Segment: Sadhiyaadal
2022	Kaathuvaakula Rendu Kaadhal	
2023	Custody	Bilingual film in Telugu and Tamil
2024	Joshua Imai Pol Kaakha	
2024	Vettaiyan	
2026	Mandaadi	
2026	Dhruva Natchathiram: Chapter One - Yuddha Kaandam †	Along with Manoj Paramahamsa and Vishnu Dev

== Awards ==
- Best Cinematographer at Boston international Film Festival (2022) - Jai Bhim
- Best Cinemotographer Vijay Awards (2009)
- Best Cinemotographer (2008) - Subramaniapuram
- Best Cinemotographer Anandha Vikatan awards (2016) - Kidaari
