= Philomin Raj =

Indian film editor

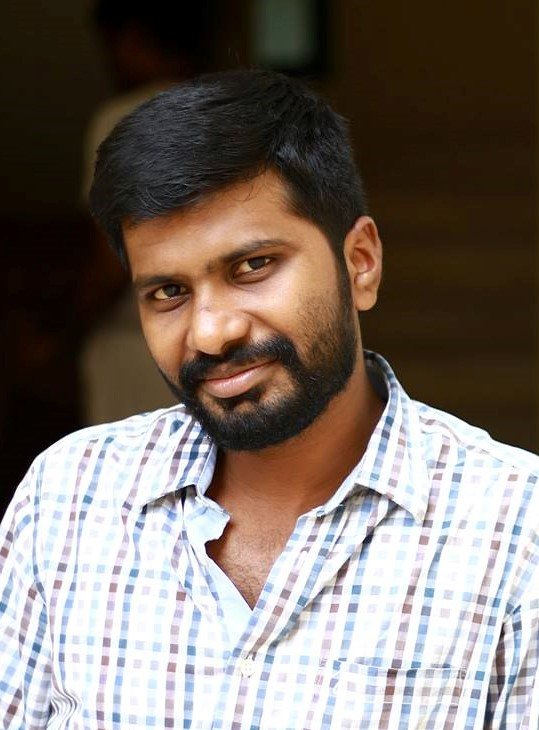
- Born: Thanjavur
- Occupation: Editor
- Years active: 2016 - present
- Notable work: Maanagaram, Kaithi, Master, Jai Bhim, Vikram, Leo, Coolie

Philomin Raj is a film editor who works in Tamil films. He is a frequent collaborator of Lokesh Kanagaraj, T. J. Gnanavel and Madonne Ashwin.

== Career ==
Philomin Raj worked as an editor for the third season of Naalaya Iyukunar. He worked as an editor for Lokesh Kanagaraj's corporate advertisements and a television film before working on the film Maanagaram (2017). In a review of Maanagaram by The Hindu, the reviewer wrote that "The editing looks crisp shifting to the various characters and episodes leaving you curious about the rest". Raj garnered acclaim for his work in Kaithi (2019).

== Personal life ==
In Bharathidasan University, he majored B.Sc - Design and Visual Communications. He married Dhivya Pradeepa in 2021.

== Filmography ==
Year	Title	Notes
2016	Aviyal	Segment: Kalam
2017	Maanagaram	
2018	Vella Raja	Prime Video web series
2019	Mehandi Circus	
2019	Raatchasi	
2019	Kaithi	
2021	Master	
2021	Mandela	
2021	Jai Bhim	
2022	Taanakkaran	
2022	Vikram	
2022	Gulu Gulu	
2022	Witness	
2023	Maaveeran	
2023	Leo	
2023	Japan	
2023	Parking	
2024	Maharaja	
2024	Vettaiyan	
2024	Black	
2025	Coolie	
2025	Sirai	
2026	Benz †	

== Accolades ==
Date	Award	Category	Work	Result	Ref.
2018	Vijay Awards	Best Editor	Maanagaram	Won	
2020	Norway Tamil Film Festival Awards	Best Editor	Kaithi	Won	
2023	Ananda Vikatan Cinema Awards	Best Editor	Maaveeran, Parking	Won	
2024	Ananda Vikatan Cinema Awards	Best Editor	Maharaja, Black	Won	
