= Kisan Faguji Bansod =

Indian dalit revolutionary (1879–1946)

Kisan Faguji Bansod (1879 – 1946) was a leader of Dalit movement in pre-independence India.

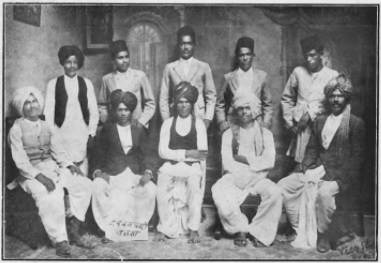
Jalsa of Kisan Faguji Bansod

Bansod was born on 18 February 1879 in a Mahar family at Mohapa village near Nagpur. Influenced by the Bhakti cult, he was a proponent of upliftment of dalits within the fold of Hinduism. He was an advocate of education for dalit boys and girls. Therefore, he established one Chokhamela girls' school at Nagpur. He was also aware of importance of the press to create awareness among the dalit community. He started his own press in 1910 and published the journals Nirashrit Hind Nagarik, Vital Vidhwansak, Majur Patrika, and Chokhamela. He was one of the secretaries of All India Depressed Classes Conference held at Nagpur in 1920.

Bansod was influenced by the works of Brahmo Samaj and Prarthana Samaj. He attended the annual function of Prarthana Samaj in 1905 at Mumbai. He was also associated with Vitthal Ramji Shinde, founder of Depressed Classes Mission. Though he was a supporter of theory of Aryan conquest and enslavement of dalits, contrary to Dr. B. R. Ambedkar, he was in favour of reforms in Hinduism rather than conversion out of it.

He died on 10 October 1946 at Nagpur.
