= Vettaiyan =

2024 Indian film by T. J. Gnanavel

- Theatrical release poster
- Directed by: T. J. Gnanavel
- Screenplay by: B. Kiruthika
- Story by: T. J. Gnanavel
- Produced by: Subaskaran Allirajah
- Starring: Rajinikanth; Amitabh Bachchan; Fahadh Faasil; Rana Daggubati; Manju Warrier; Ritika Singh; Dushara Vijayan
- Cinematography: S. R. Kathir
- Edited by: Philomin Raj
- Music by: Anirudh Ravichander
- Production company: Lyca Productions
- Distributed by: Red Giant Movies
- Release date: 10 October 2024
- Running time: 163 minutes
- Country: India
- Language: Tamil
- Budget: ₹300 crore
- Box office: ₹250–253 crore (Note: Vettaiyan's reported worldwide grosses vary between ₹250 crore (Hindustan Times, The Economic Times) – ₹253 crore (Filmfare))

Vettaiyan (/veɪttəjən/ transl. Hunter) is a 2024 Indian Tamil-language action drama film directed by T. J. Gnanavel and produced by Subaskaran Allirajah's Lyca Productions. The film stars an ensemble cast of Rajinikanth, Amitabh Bachchan (in his Tamil debut), Fahadh Faasil, Rana Daggubati, Manju Warrier, Ritika Singh, Dushara Vijayan, Rohini, Kishore, Abhirami, and Rao Ramesh. The film follows a police officer who accidentally shoots an innocent person during an encounter killing, while investigating the murder of a teacher.

The film was officially announced in March 2023 under the tentative title Thalaivar 170, as it is the 170th film with Rajinikanth as lead actor, and the official title was announced in December 2023. Principal photography commenced in October 2023 and ended in August 2024. It was shot in several locations including Thiruvananthapuram, Tirunelveli, Chennai, Mumbai, and Hyderabad. The film has music composed by Anirudh Ravichander, cinematography handled by S. R. Kathir and editing by Philomin Raj.

Vettaiyan released worldwide on 10 October 2024 in theatres, coinciding with Vijayadashami, to mixed reviews from critics who praised Rajinikanth, Amitabh Bachchan, Fahadh Faasil and Rana Daggubati's performance and technical aspects while the storyline and pacing received criticism. Although emerging as the third highest-grossing Tamil film of 2024 and the seventeenth highest-grossing Tamil film of all time, it was a Box-office bomb.

== Plot ==
Athiyan, a Superintendent of Police in the Kanyakumari district, is a renowned encounter specialist known as "Vettaiyan" for taking down criminals with the help of his team and "Battery" Patrick, a thief-turned-police informer who is also a tech genius. Athiyan receives a complaint from Saranya, a middle-school teacher, from Pechipaarai about marijuana being stored in classrooms, leading to student drug abuse and disrupted classes. Following the tip, Athiyan and his team arrest Kumaresan, the man behind the drug production, and kill him in an encounter, earning public approval but drawing scrutiny of the human rights commission. Justice Sathyadev Bramhadutt Pandey visits the encounter case hearing for observation while the court rules the encounter justified. Saranya gets closer to Athiyan's family and is soon transferred to Chennai.

Soon, Saranya is brutally raped and murdered on the terrace of her new school, with her body discovered in the water tank. SP Harish Kumar and ASP Roopa Kiran led the investigation, uncovering Guna, a software engineer and the brother of Saranya's school student Chitra, as the perpetrator due to his alleged addiction to pornography. Teachers protest statewide, demanding Guna's arrest and justice for Saranya. Guna escapes custody from the hospital, prompting authorities to deploy Athiyan, and Athiyan tracks and kills him in an encounter at sea. While the public praises this, Sathyadev reveals that Guna was in Hyderabad during the crime, proving his innocence. Devastated by his mistake, Athiyan reopens the case with Patrick, Roopa, and Harish, uncovering gaps in the original investigation.

Their efforts led them to Hanu Reddy, a contract killer hired to murder and rape Saranya. However, Hanu is killed before they can discover who hired him. With Patrick's technical expertise, the team uncovers Harish's corruption: he had tipped off Hanu about the police's pursuit and took a bribe to frame Guna. Investigations with a Nat Academy employee, Swetha, revealed that the chairman, Natraj Shanmugam, was involved in a scam that lured parents and students with promises of 100% pass rates in competitive exams through online courses. Many families took loans to join, but the Nat Academy refused refunds when they discontinued or could not pay, and those who complained faced threats and violence from Hanu Reddy's gang. To hide the scam, Natraj partnered with the Government under the "Smart Student Scheme" to provide free entrance exam coaching classes to government schools, deceiving people by disparaging the standards of government schools by bribing social media influencers. Saranya and Guna, whose sister was also a subscriber to Nat Academy's online course, had uncovered evidence of the scam before Saranya's demise.

Athiyan attempts to arrest Natraj but is transferred to the Economic Offences Wing in retaliation. Subsequently, Athiyan collaborates with DSP Nazeema to investigate Natraj under the provisions of the BUDS Act 2019. To gather evidence, Athiyan, with the assistance of his wife Thara, a social media influencer, collects complaints from parents across the state who claimed to have been defrauded by Nat Academy's online courses. Natraj sends goons simultaneously to intimidate Athiyan, Thara, and Roopa, but these attempts are unsuccessful. Athiyan learns that a hard disk drive was sent by Saranya and, upon recovering it, finds proof of Natraj's scams, but Natraj's henchmen kill Patrick during the investigation. Swetha bribes the public prosecutor, allowing Natraj to evade a court case.

Athiyan, lacking concrete evidence linking Natraj to Saranya's murder, with his nephew Dharan's help, shares Saranya's final video, revealing Natraj's purported scam and attempted murder on social media. Then he convenes a press conference to share findings on Natraj's scam, expose Harish's role in falsely implicating Guna, and declare Guna's innocence. The police arrest Harish and Natraj, and the government annuls all MoUs with Nat Academy, leading to its ban. During transportation from Puzhal prison to the court, Natraj escapes custody, taking Roopa hostage. Athiyan confronts Natraj and subdues him and his henchmen, securing Natraj's arrest.

Six months later, Natraj is sentenced to life in prison for Saranya and Patrick's deaths, and Athiyan steps back from his encounter-driven methods, supporting Sathyadev and choosing to let justice take its course.

== Cast ==
- Rajinikanth as SP V. Athiyan IPS (Vettaiyan)
- Amitabh Bachchan as Justice Dr. Sathyadev Bramhadutt Pandey, National Human Rights Commission of India
- Fahadh Faasil as Cyber Patrick "Battery"
- Rana Daggubati as Natraj "Nat" Shanmugam
- Manju Warrier as Thara, Athiyan's wife
- Ritika Singh as ASP Roopa Kiran
- Dushara Vijayan as Saranya, a teacher
- Asal Kolaar as Guna
- Krish Hassan as Sathish, Guna's friend
- Rohini as DSP Nazeema, Indian Economic Service
- Abhirami as Swetha Dhakshinamoorthy
- Kishore as SP K. Harish Kumar
- Rao Ramesh as DGP D. Shrinivas
- Ramesh Thilak as Anbu, Office peon
- Rakshan as Dharan, Athiyan's nephew
- G. M. Sundar as Inspector Lourdhu Samy
- Sabumon Abdusamad as Kumaresan
- Supreeth as Hanu Reddy
- Shaji Chen as Chennai Police Commissioner K. Virendar
- R. Aravindraj as V. Rathinam, Tamil Nadu Home Minister
- Alencier Ley Lopez as Combined Courts Judge
- Remya Suresh as Saranya's mother
- Ananth Nag as ASP Ram
- Birla Bose as DSP
- B. S. Avinash as Perusu
- Kalki Raja as Kumaresan's sidekick
- Thanmaya Sol as Chithra, Guna's sister
- Vasanthi as Guna's mother
- Aruvi Bala as Compounder
- Sri Deva as NAT Academy Agent
- Aroul D. Shankar as Education Minister
- Vinod Sagar as Politician
- Krishnudu as Kadapa Head Constable Srinivasa Rao (Note: Although the character was unnamed in the end credits, the name was revealed in the film.)
- Anirudh Ravichander as himself in the song "Manasilaayo"

== Production ==
=== Development ===
In May 2022, it was reported that director T. J. Gnanavel would reunite with Suriya for his next directorial post the critically acclaimed Jai Bhim (2021). Then Suriya stated that if his film with Vetrimaaran, Vaadivaasal, got further delayed due to extensive pre-production works, they would collaborate again. Production was to begin after Suriya completed his commitments with Bala's Vanangaan at that time, but Suriya left Vanangaan due to reported creative differences with Bala. Gnanavel confirmed the reunion in November 2022 during an interview for the occasion. He further stated that he narrated the script to Suriya during the filming of Jai Bhim in 2021, and the actor approved it back then.

In July 2022, director Cibi Chakravarthy, was reported to begin work for his next, which would either star Vijay or Rajinikanth, with the latter being the top contender. In August, Chakravarthy confirmed that he indeed had begun work for his next directorial but the lead actor was not finalised. Throughout the year, speculations arose over the collaboration of the director and Rajinikanth and the film was temporarily titled Thalaivar 170. As Rajinikanth signed a two-film deal with Lyca Productions due to the success of 2.0 (2018), the venture was reported to be produced by Lyca. In January 2023, Chakravarthy reportedly confirmed the collaboration of him and Rajinikanth. However, the project failed to materialise and was dropped.

=== Pre-production ===
In January 2023, sources claimed that due to Suriya's commitments with Siva's Kanguva and Vetrimaran's Vaadivaasal, Gnanavel began work on another script. He reportedly narrated it to Rajinikanth, who was impressed by the director and immediately gave his nod. Lyca Productions announced the project on 2 March, tentatively titled Thalaivar 170. The project was planned to start after Rajinikanth wrapped up Jailer (2023) and Lal Salaam (2024). A muhurat puja was held on 4 October in Thiruvananthapuram in the presence of the cast and crew.

The film was made on a budget of ₹160 crore (US$17 million). Anirudh Ravichander would score the music, in his maiden collaboration with Gnanavel. On 4 October 2023, the technical crew including cinematographer S. R. Kathir, editor Philomin Raj and stunt choreography duo Anbariv were announced to have been retained by Gnanavel, after they previously worked in Jai Bhim. Art director K. Kathir, make-up artist Pattanam Rasheed and costume designer Anu Vardhan were chosen as crew. The official title Vettaiyan was announced on 12 December 2023, coinciding with Rajinikanth's 73rd birthday.

=== Casting ===
Rajinikanth plays a police officer. In October 2023, Bollywood actor Amitabh Bachchan joined the cast, making his debut in Tamil cinema, as well as in his reunion with Rajinikanth after Hum (1991). Bachchan was initially set to make his Tamil debut with Uyarndha Manidhan, which got shelved. Fahadh Faasil was signed for a comic role in his fifth Tamil film Manju Warrier, Ritika Singh and Dushara Vijayan play the female leads, and Rana Daggubati was chosen for a prominent role in the film. The actresses were announced on 2 October 2023, while Daggubati was announced the day after, by the production house. Rakshan and G. M. Sundar's presence at the muhurat puja confirmed their inclusion. Rohini, Rao Ramesh, and Ramesh Thilak were later confirmed to be a part of the cast.

=== Filming ===
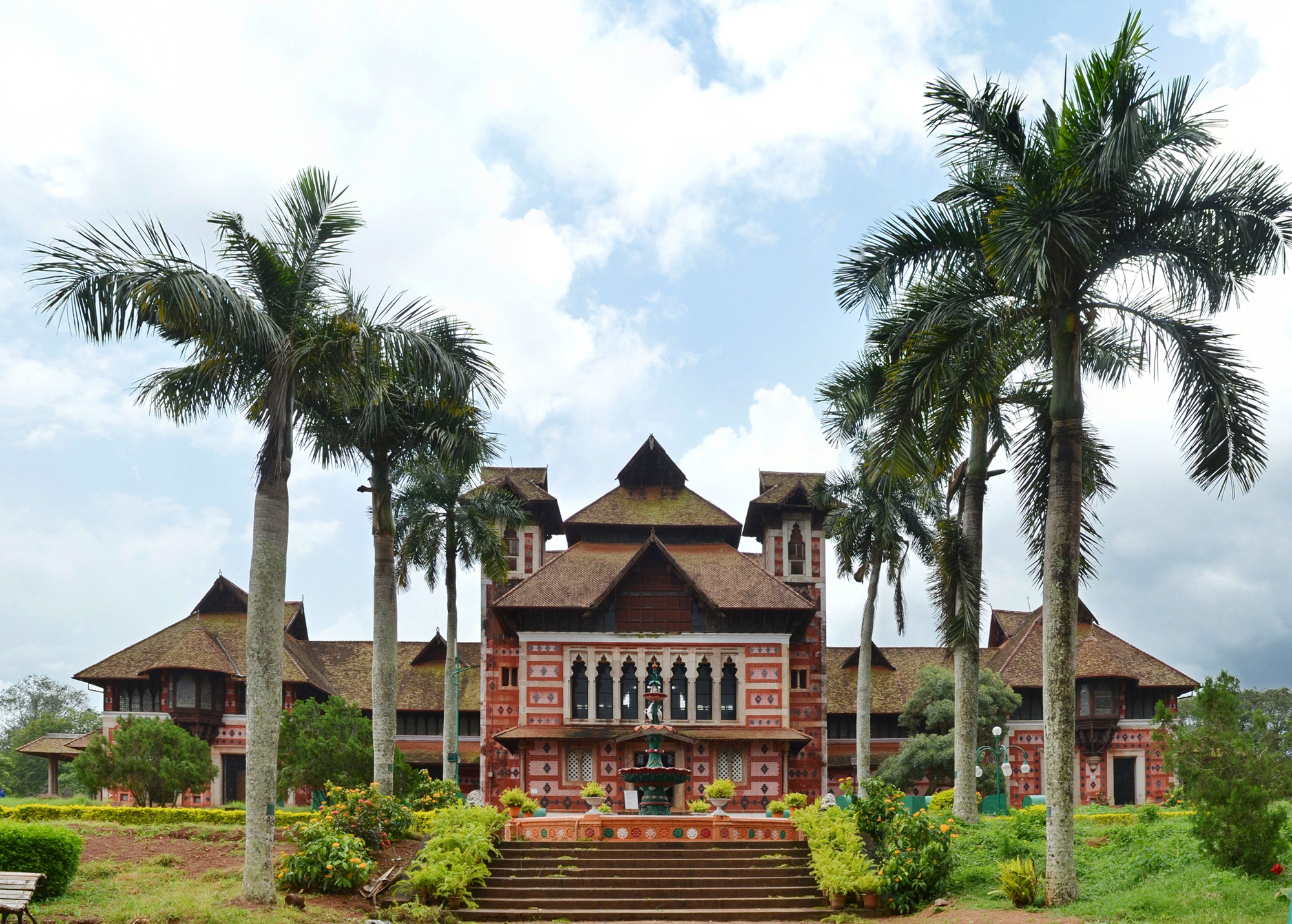
Filming took place in Thiruvananthapuram

Principal photography was scheduled to begin on the third week of September 2023 in Chennai, but ultimately began on 4 October in Thiruvananthapuram, Kerala. Production moved to Tirunelveli on 11 October. In late October, the second schedule began filming in Mumbai, with Rajinikanth and Bachchan. The schedule concluded by 30 October. On 20 November, the filming began at Prasad Labs, Chennai. During this schedule, as Indian 2 was filming in the same studio, Rajinikanth and Kamal Haasan met at the studio and posted videos and pictures to social media, which went viral. In early December, Singh, through her social media, stated that she would take a break from filming as she injured herself during the filming of her portions.

A leaked picture of Rajinikanth and Fahadh, taken by paparazzi, was posted to X (formerly Twitter), where the film's social media security partner removed the picture from the social media and warned the users not to post or else they would lose their account. After a short break for Pongal, filming resumed in Puducherry. That schedule concluded by mid-January 2024. The final schedule began on 28 January in Kadapa, Andhra Pradesh. Rajinikanth, on 10 February, stated that 80% filming was done. In early March, production moved to Hyderabad, and Daggubati began filming his portions on 4 March. Filming of Rajinikanth's portions ended on 13 May 2024, while overall filming ended in late August.

== Music ==
The music and background score was composed by Anirudh Ravichander, in his fourth collaboration with Rajinikanth after Petta (2019), Darbar (2020) and Jailer (2023); maiden with Gnanavel. The audio rights were acquired by Sony Music India. "Vettaiyan Birthday Teaser Music" was the song that was used in the title teaser that released on the occasion of Rajinikanth's birthday (12 December 2023). The first single "Manasilaayo" was released on 9 September 2024. It featured late singer Malaysia Vasudevan's vocals generated via artificial intelligence. The second single titled "Hunter Vantaar" was released on 20 September 2024. The audio launch was held later the same day at Nehru Stadium, Chennai. The third single "Uchathila" was released on 11 October 2024, after the film's release. The full album containing 9 tracks was released on 14 October 2024.

== Marketing ==
The official prevue for Vettaiyan was released on 20 September. It received mixed response from viewers, with some finding Prakash Raj voicing Bachchan jarring. Subsequently, the makers decided to replace Raj's voice with Bachchan's own for the final cut and all other language releases, enhanced via artificial intelligence. The official trailer of the film was released on 2 October 2024, coinciding with Gandhi Jayanti.

== Release ==
=== Theatrical ===
Vettaiyan was theatrically released on 10 October 2024, coinciding with Vijayadashami. In the United Kingdom, the film was released on the same day; however, in a version which was classified 15 by the British Board of Film Classification (BBFC) for strong violence, bloody images and sexual violence, following 2 minutes of cuts.

Vettaiyan was the first Tamil film to be released with closed captions and audio descriptions, although they were previously used in preview shows for Love Today (2022) and The Greatest of All Time (2024).

=== Distribution ===
Red Giant Movies acquired the distribution rights of the film in Tamil Nadu. Lyca Productions distributed the film themselves overseas. Sree Gokulam Movies acquired the distribution rights for Kerala. Harman Baweja acquired the Hindi distribution rights under the banner Baweja Studios. Dil Raju acquired the Andhra Pradesh and Telangana distribution rights.

=== Home media ===
The post-theatrical streaming rights were acquired by Amazon Prime Video. The film began streaming there from 8 November 2024 in the original Tamil version and dubbed versions in Telugu, Hindi, Malayalam and Kannada languages.

== Reception ==
=== Critical response ===
Vettaiyan received mixed reviews from critics, who praised Rajinikanth, Amitabh Bachchan, Fahadh Faasil and Rana Daggubati's performance and technical aspects, while the storyline and pacing received criticism.

Goutham S of Pinkvilla gave 3.5/5 stars and wrote "Vettaiyan is an investigative action-drama that is told in a Rajinikanth-style narration. With strong convictions and a narrative to the storyline, the film offers a new dimension to telling good stories." Sridevi S of The Times of India gave 3/5 stars and wrote "The movie is a predictable investigative thriller-social drama that packs several ‘Rajini moments’ for fans to cherish". Avinash Ramachandran of The Indian Express gave 2.5 stars and wrote "Confining Rajinikanth to a box isn’t easy as the world is still grappling with the dichotomy of being torn between wanting to see Rajinikanth in a new avatar, and wanting to see him exude style and charisma like old times. What do we really want? Well, the hunt for the answer is on."

Saibal Chatterjee of NDTV gave 2.5/5 stars and wrote "Vettaiyan is a Rajinikanth film all the way but it is by no means only for fans of the Thalaivar. It talks about issues that matter and it has Fahadh Faasil in sparkling form.". Kirubhakar Purushothaman of News18 gave 2.5/5 stars and wrote "TJ Gnanavel’s simple and predictable film leaves us wondering why it needed such supergiants in the first place." Janani K of India Today gave 2.5/5 stars and wrote "Vettaiyan is a film that will leave you unfulfilled. Courtesy: Uninteresting screenplay. It also makes you think what if the film featured an actor who doesn't come with the superstardom that Thalaivar Rajinikanth possesses?"

Bhuvanesh Chandar of The Hindu wrote "Vettaiyan is a brave attempt to do something the moral compasses of Tamil cinema have long been wishing for, and it’s arguably one of the best Rajinikanth films since Kaala." Latha Srinivasan of Hindustan Times wrote "Vettaiyan is a mixed bag and doesn’t do justice to either Superstar Rajinikanth and his legacy or to director TJ Gnanvel who gave us the powerful Jai Bhim." Internationally, Simon Abrams of RogerEbert.com gave 2.5/4 stars and wrote "Vettaiyan may sometimes feel like the worst kind of throwback, but it still manages to coast on its star and his collaborators' unshakable faith in crowd-pleasing movie logic. The filmmakers don't miss a formulaic story beat nor do they skimp on what they think their audience will want from Rajinikanth."

=== Box office ===
Vettaiyan made an opening collection of nearly $3.5 million (₹29.8 crore) in India (including all languages). Globally, the film earned nearly $8 million (₹68.1 crore) on the first day. By the end of its fourth day it grossed $14.6 million (₹124.4 crore) in India. In North America, the film crossed $2.5 million over the first weekend. Debuting 5th at the UK and Ireland box office, the film grossed £485,910 in its first weekend as per Comscore.

== Controversies ==
On 4 October 2024, following the completion of the film's censorship, a petition was filed by K. Palanivelu at Madurai Bench of Madurai High Court where they sought removal or beep of certain dialogues. The petition stated that the makers should remove the word "renowned encounter specialist" and the dialogue "encounters are not just punishment by a preventive action." Palanivelu further stated that the dialogue glorifies extrajudicial killings and in his petition, mentioned that the film should be halted from releasing on its release date until the changes are made. The division bench admitted the petition and ordered a notice.

On 9 October, Daggubati organised a press meet and addressed the situation of the release of the film in other states like Andhra Pradesh, Telangana, Karnataka and in North Indian states, being released under the title Vettaiyan The Hunter which received criticism. Daggubati used Devara: Part 1 (2024) as an argument as it was also released in Tamil Nadu with the same title.

On 12 October, a screening of the film at PVR INOX in Velachery was scheduled to begin on 9:30 am IST; however, the audiences ended up waiting for three hours, with the manager assuring them that it would begin in 10 minutes and that there was problems with the projector. After almost three hours, at 12 pm, the manager stated that the show was cancelled.

Post release, reports stated that Lyca Productions asked Rajinikanth to compensate their losses by doing another film with them with a reduced remuneration.

== Future ==
After the film's release, Gnanavel expressed interest in making a prequel that could delve into Rajinikanth and Fahadh's characters.
