= Jai Bhim (film) =

2021 film by T. J. Gnanavel

- Official release poster
- Directed by: T. J. Gnanavel
- Written by: T. J. Gnanavel
- Produced by: Jyothika; Suriya
- Starring: Suriya; Lijomol Jose; Manikandan
- Cinematography: S. R. Kathir
- Edited by: Philomin Raj
- Music by: Sean Roldan
- Production companies: 2D Entertainment; Amazon Studios
- Distributed by: Amazon Prime Video
- Release date: 2 November 2021
- Running time: 164 minutes
- Country: India
- Language: Tamil

Jai Bhim (/dʒeɪ biːm/ transl. Victory to Bhim) is a 2021 Indian Tamil-language legal drama film directed by T. J. Gnanavel. It was produced by Jyothika and Suriya under the banner of 2D Entertainment. The film stars Suriya, Lijomol Jose and Manikandan with Rajisha Vijayan, Prakash Raj, Guru Somasundaram, and Rao Ramesh in supporting roles. The film is about police bias and state violence against a marginalised community. Jai Bhim is based on a 1993 Cuddalore incident that involves a legal case fought by K. Chandru, who later became a judge; it revolves around Sengeni and Rajakannu, a couple from the Irula tribe. Police arrested Rajakannu and he later went missing from the police station. Sengeni seeks the help of lawyer Chandru to seek justice for her husband.

The film was announced in April 2021, and principal photography began that month with the filming of sequences in Chennai and Kodaikanal. Production was halted due to the COVID-19 pandemic; filming resumed in July 2021 and was completed that September. S. R. Kathir handled the cinematography and Philomin Raj was the editor. Sean Roldan composed the film's music and score. The film's title is a reference to a slogan used by followers of B. R. Ambedkar.

Jai Bhim was released on Amazon Prime Video, prior to Diwali, on 2 November 2021 as part of a multi-film deal signed by 2D Entertainment. The film received nationwide acclaim from critics, who praised the story, performances of Suriya, Lijomol Jose and Manikandan, direction and social message. Several publications have listed Jai Bhim as one of the best Tamil and Indian films of 2021.

== Plot ==
In 1993, Rajakannu and Sengeni, a couple from the marginalized Irula tribe, survive by catching rats and venomous snakes for affluent, upper-caste landowners. After Rajakannu is summoned to remove a snake from the residence of a local village leader, a massive jewelry theft is reported at the house, and immediate suspicion falls upon him. The local police launch a violent raid on his home, unlawfully detaining and assaulting the heavily pregnant Sengeni. Unable to locate Rajakannu, the authorities illegally arrest his brother Iruttappan, his sister Pachaiammal, and his brother-in-law Mosakutty, subjecting them to severe physical torture to extract Rajakannu's whereabouts. Although Sengeni is eventually released, Rajakannu is subsequently captured and tortured brutally alongside his relatives to coerce a confession. Soon after, the police abruptly inform Sengeni that Rajakannu, Iruttappan, and Mosakutty have escaped from custody, using this narrative to justify continued surveillance and harassment against her.

Mythra, a dedicated educator running adult literacy programs for the Irula community, recognizes the systemic injustice and connects Sengeni with Chandru, an activist Communist lawyer renowned for defending tribal rights without charging fees. Recognizing the severity of the situation, Chandru files a habeas corpus petition in the Madras High Court. Citing historical legal precedents of custodial violence, he successfully secures a court order for witness examinations. The state's legal counsel, backed by the testimonies of the handling officers, rigidly maintains that the three men broke out of jail. Suspecting a coordinated cover-up and widespread perjury, Chandru demands a targeted inquiry into the primary officers involved: Sub-Inspector Gurumurthy, Head constable Veerasamy, and Constable Kirubakaran.

The state subsequently hands the defense to the highly influential Advocate General, Ram Mohan, who presents testimony from Iruttappan's employer, Varadarajulu, claiming that Iruttappan telephoned him from Kerala to confess to the robbery. However, Chandru meticulously exposes a flaw in this evidence, proving that the police traveled to Kerala themselves to place the call, with Gurumurthy impersonating the missing tribal man. Prompted by Chandru's findings, the High Court appoints a highly objective investigator, Inspector General Perumalsamy, to oversee an independent probe.

Through weeks of rigorous cross-referencing of unclassified medical logs near the Pondicherry border, Chandru and Perumalsamy discover that an unidentified male body matching Rajakannu's description was recovered and hastily cremated the morning after his alleged escape. Armed with this discovery, Chandru confronts the forensic pathologist at JIPMER who performed the autopsy. It is revealed that although the official autopsy report attribute the fatalities to a routine hit-and-run accident, the severe fractures and internal trauma were entirely consistent with systemic blunt-force trauma. Realizing the defense is collapsing, Veerasamy privately confesses to Ram Mohan that Rajakannu succumbed to torture during interrogation. To evade accountability, Gurumurthy had orchestrated the escape narrative, staged Rajakannu's corpse on a highway to mimic a vehicular accident, and secretly transferred the surviving witnesses, Iruttappan and Mosakutty, to an isolated cell across state lines.

As Chandru, Mythra, and Sengeni mobilize public demonstrations, the legal team intensifies its investigation. Mythra successfully tracks down Iruttappan and Mosakutty in a hidden jail near Dharapuram. Brought before the High Court, the two men deliver harrowing testimonies detailing the torture they endured and confirming they witnessed Rajakannu's death. Perumalsamy uncovers a deeper layer of corruption, presenting evidence that the accused officers accepted substantial bribes from the actual thief to frame Rajakannu. Furthermore, Chandru introduces irrefutable forensic evidence linking the tire tracks at the body disposal site to Gurumurthy's official police vehicle.

Confronted with overwhelming evidence, the High Court delivers a landmark judgment, ordering an expedited murder trial and the immediate arrest of the three compromised policemen. The bench formally commends Chandru and Perumalsamy for their pursuit of justice and mandates substantial financial compensation and land allocation for Sengeni and the surviving victims. The narrative concludes with Chandru attending the housewarming ceremony of Sengeni's newly constructed home, successfully fulfilling Rajakannu’s lifelong promise to his wife.

== Cast ==
- Suriya as Adv. K. Chandru
- Lijomol Jose as Sengeni Rajakannu
- Manikandan as Rajakannu
- Rajisha Vijayan as Mythra
- Prakash Raj as IG Perumalsamy IPS
- Guru Somasundaram as PP Chellapandiyan
- Baby Joshika Maya as Alli Rajakannu
- Rao Ramesh as Advocate general Ram Mohan
- Tamizh as Sub-inspector Gurumoorthy
- Supergood Subramani as Head Constable Veerasamy
- Bala Hasan as Constable Kirubakaran
- M. Chinraasu as Irutappan
- Subatra Robert as Pachaiyammal
- Rajendran as Mosakutty
- Jayaprakash as DGP Radhakrishnan IPS, State Police Chief
- M. S. Bhaskar as Sankaran Narayan Iyer
- Ilavarasu as Gunasekaran
- Elango Kumaravel as Albi Antony
- Jaya Rao as Kathirvel
- Sujatha Sivakumar as Subbulakshmi
- Ravi Venkatraman as Inspector Bashyam
- Sibi Thomas as SP Ashok Varadhan
- Raja Rani Pandian as Rajan
- Shankar Sundaram as Sathyadev
- Jijoy Rajagopal as Munnar Rajesh
- Sanjay Swaroop as Judge
- Kumar Natarajan as Judge
- Bava Chelladurai as Krishnan
- David Solomon Raja as Sasikumar Pandian
- Anagoor Raaju as Rajakannu's uncle
- Deepa as Irutappan's wife
- Kaveri as Mosakutty's wife
- Bigil Siva as Dr. Mahesh
- Sivaranjani as Gunasekaran's wife
- V. Renganathan as Rajakannu's employer
- Srikanth as Rice Mill Owner
- Rajesh Balachandiran as Nataraj
- Aravinth Seiju as Madhan
- Pandian as Rajan
- P. R. Kaalishwaran as Kalyani
- S. Ravi as Elumalai
- K. Raju as Vinod
- P. R. George as Rajesh
- Batman as Ravi
- Kulotungan as jewellery shop owner
- Dhanasekar as a tea shop owner
- Ramachandran as Judge
- Dayalan as jailor
- Yuva as Arunachalam
- Dandapani as Ramasamy
- Ashokan as Kaaliappan
- Saravanan as Sekhar
- Deva as Sankar
- Kumarasamy as Janakiraman
- Subramanian as Rangarajan

== Production ==
=== Development ===
In March 2020, media reported Suriya would be collaborating with T. J. Gnanavel, director of Kootathil Oruthan (2017), for a legal drama film based on tribal people. It was further stated that the film would be based on a true incident in 1993, and Suriya plays the role of a lawyer. His role is based on retired Madras High Court justice and former senior advocate K. Chandru, who campaigned for justice for a woman of the Irular tribe. The tribeswoman's husband Rajakannu was arrested and later disappeared from the police station. In the hope of justice for Rajakannu, she sought the help of Chandru, who investigated the matter and brought justice to the woman and her family. Gnanavel met the lawyer and interacted with him for several weeks to understand more about the case. The development team took a workshop from actor–director R. Madhavan on quickly making a biopic of a prominent individual, following the actor's work on Rocketry: The Nambi Effect (2022).

The film's technical crew were composer Sean Roldan, editor Philomin Raj, videographer S. R. Kathir, production designer Jacki and stunt-coordinator duo Anbariv. The film's title Jai Bhim, which is based on a slogan used by followers of B. R. Ambedkar, was announced on 23 July 2021 with a first-look release. The title was already taken by director Pa. Ranjith, a follower of Ambedkar's ideologies, and Suriya said Ranjith gave the film crew the title.

=== Casting ===
The project was formally announced in April 2021 with Suriya producing the film under the banner 2D Entertainment. Initially, Roshini Haripriyan was approached for the role of Sengeni but the role eventually went to Lijomol Jose. In May 2021, Malayalam film actor Rajisha Vijayan signed for a pivotal role after her Tamil debut with Karnan (2021). K. Manikandan signed to portray Rajakannu after agreeing to Gnanavel's condition of spending an extended time with Irular tribespeople to learn their lifestyle without committing to other projects.

=== Filming ===
Principal photography began in mid-2021 in Chennai; Suriya joined the sets after completing a schedule for Etharkkum Thunindhavan (2021), although production on both films was halted due to the COVID-19 pandemic and the subsequent lockdown. In July 2021, shooting of the films resumed. Principal photography on Jai Bhim was completed by September 2021.

=== Post-production ===
In October 2021, the final copy of Jai Bhim was submitted to the Central Board of Film Certification, which gave the film an "A" (adults-only) certificate. It is the first time a Suriya-starrer was given this rating since Rakta Charitra 2.

== Music ==
Sean Roldan composed the film score and soundtrack, and Yugabharathi, Raju Murugan and Arivu wrote lyrics. The five-track original soundtrack album was preceded by the singles "Power", "Thala Kodhum" and "Sendumalli". The album was released through music-streaming platforms on 1 November 2021, and the sixth song "Manniley Eeramundu" was released as a bonus single on 15 November 2021.

== Release ==
On 5 August 2021, 2D Entertainment signed a four-film deal with the streaming service Amazon Prime Video. As part of this deal, four of the studio's upcoming projects would premiere on Prime Video while bypassing theatrical release. Jai Bhim was scheduled for a streaming release during November 2021.

On 2 October, the producers announced the film would be released worldwide on 2 November 2021 ahead of the Diwali festival. The film was dubbed in Hindi, Telugu, Malayalam and Kannada. Jai Bhim was screened at the ninth edition of Noida International Film Festival on 23 January 2022. The film was also shown as part of the "World Competition" segment at the 20th edition of Pune International Film Festival, which was held in March 2022.

== Reception ==
=== Critical response ===
Jai Bhim received critical acclaim, with praise for the script; performances of Suriya, Lijomol Jose and Manikandan; direction; and technical aspects. On the review aggregator website Rotten Tomatoes, 100% of 7 critics' reviews are positive, with an average rating of 7.8/10.

Ranjani Krishnakumar of Film Companion wrote: "Jai Bhim is a solid film held together by craftly [sic] writing, thoughtful filmmaking, restrained performances and a true incident of the justice system restoring hope". NDTV critic Saibal Chatterjee gave the film three-and-a-half out of five, writing: "The amalgamation of the lead actor's charisma, the urgency of the theme and the force of the no-holds-barred storytelling results in an immersive and riveting film that calls attention to the plight of an oppressed community languishing on the fringes of society". S. Srivatsan of The Hindu wrote: "'Jai Bhim' is perhaps one of the boldest films to have come out of Tamil cinema. It doesn't dare turn its back on hitting where it hurts the most, and its politics is not weighed down by the presence of a star like Suriya." Writing for The Indian Express, Manoj Kumar R. gave the film four out of five, writing: "Suriya feels natural and very comfortable in the role of a firebrand advocate. It is as if he's not just performing the lines written by the director, but he really believes in every word and gesture he delivers in this film." Sowmya Rajendran of The News Minute also gave the film four out of five, writing: "As a courtroom drama and investigative thriller, based on real events, Jai Bhim is head and shoulders above the average fare". M. Suganth of The Times of India gave the film three-and-a-half out of five, praising the film's defiant moments, Lijomol Jose's powerful portrayal of Sengeni, and Manikandan's impactful performance, while appreciating the charming depiction of the relationship between Sengeni and Rajakannu.. Ashameera Aiyyappan of Firstpost gave the film four out of five and called the film "hard-hitting and intense," noting its realism and nuanced portrayal of the marginalized community without reducing them to stereotypes. Hindustan Times's Haricharan Pudipeddi commended the realistic courtroom sequences, Suriya's mature performance as a lawyer, and Manikandan's gut-wrenching portrayal of helplessness. He also praised Lijomol Jose's casting as a strong, defiant woman.. A critic from Onmanorama emphasized that Jai Bhim is more than a courtroom drama, calling it a "much-needed film" with lasting relevance. Janani K. of India Today gave the film four-and-a-half out of five and described the film as a milestone in Tamil cinema, highlighting its focus on caste discrimination, injustice, and the lack of humanity in the system.." Sudhir Srinivasan, writing for Cinema Express acknowledged the film's importance in documenting the oppression of a community, even though it lacked strong adversaries for the protagonist. He praised Suriya's performance and his role as a "saviour" and "victim" of his conscience. Harish Wankhede from The Hindu described the protagonist as an Ambedkarite hero who fights for tribal dignity, while portraying Sengeni as a dignified claimant of justice rather than a powerless victim..

=== Accolades ===
The film was made available for screening at the 94th Academy Awards but was not nominated.

Award	Date of ceremony	Category	Recipient(s) and nominee(s)	Result	Ref.
Huading Awards	1 December 2022	Best Global Picture	2D Entertainment	Won	
Boston International Film Festival	5 May 2022	Best Actress	Lijomol Jose	Won	
Boston International Film Festival	5 May 2022	Best Cinematography	S. R. Kathir	Won	
Ananda Vikatan Cinema Awards	December 2022	Best Film	2D Entertainment	Won	
Ananda Vikatan Cinema Awards	December 2022	Best Director	T. J. Gnanavel	Won	
Ananda Vikatan Cinema Awards	December 2022	Best Actor	Suriya	Won	
Ananda Vikatan Cinema Awards	December 2022	Best Actress	Lijomol Jose	Won	
Critics Choice Film Awards	March 2022	Best Film	Jai Bhim – 2D Entertainment	Nominated	
Critics Choice Film Awards	March 2022	Best Actress	Lijomol Jose	Nominated	
Filmfare Awards South	9 October 2022	Best Film – Tamil	2D Entertainment	Won	
Filmfare Awards South	9 October 2022	Best Director – Tamil	T. J. Gnanavel	Nominated	
Filmfare Awards South	9 October 2022	Best Actor – Tamil	Suriya	Nominated	
Filmfare Awards South	9 October 2022	Best Actor – Tamil	K. Manikandan	Nominated	
Filmfare Awards South	9 October 2022	Best Actress – Tamil	Lijomol Jose	Won	
Filmfare Awards South	9 October 2022	Best Supporting Actor – Tamil	Prakash Raj	Nominated	
Noida International Film Festival	23 January 2022	Best Film	Jai Bhim – 2D Entertainment	Won	
Noida International Film Festival	23 January 2022	Best Actor	Suriya	Won	
Noida International Film Festival	23 January 2022	Best Actress	Lijomol Jose	Won	
South Indian International Movie Awards	10–11 September 2022	Best Actor – Tamil	Suriya	Nominated	
South Indian International Movie Awards	10–11 September 2022	Best Actress – Tamil	Lijomol Jose	Nominated	
South Indian International Movie Awards	10–11 September 2022	Best Supporting Actor – Tamil	K. Manikandan	Nominated	
South Indian International Movie Awards	10–11 September 2022	Best Supporting Actress – Tamil	Rajisha Vijayan	Nominated	
South Indian International Movie Awards	10–11 September 2022	Best Cinematographer – Tamil	S. R. Kathir	Nominated	
Tamil Nadu State Film Awards	13 February 2026	Best Film	—N/a	Won	
Tamil Nadu State Film Awards	13 February 2026	Best Actress	Lijomol Jose	Won	
Tamil Nadu State Film Awards	13 February 2026	Best Director	T. J. Gnanavel	Won	
Tamil Nadu State Film Awards	13 February 2026	Best Villain	Tamizh	Won	
Tamil Nadu State Film Awards	13 February 2026	Best Supporting Actor	K. Manikandan	Won	
Tamil Nadu State Film Awards	13 February 2026	Best Music Director	Sean Roldan	Won	
Tamil Nadu State Film Awards	13 February 2026	Best Playback Singer – Male	Arivu	Won	

== Controversies ==
Jai Bhim attracted opposition by the Vanniyar caste group Vanniyar Sangam, the parent organisation of Pattali Makkal Katchi (PMK), regarding a scene involving sub-inspector Gurumoorthy, which the PMK leaders said insults the community. PMK leader Anbumani Ramadoss wrote a letter asking questions about the film and saying it defamed the community. In the film, an image of a pot of fire, a symbol of the Vanniyar community, is seen on a wall calendar in the sub-inspector's residence.

Ramadoss criticised the choice of name for the character Gurumoorthy, which he said defames PMK leader Kaduvetti Guru. While the film uses the names of the individuals in the case for their on-screen characters, the sub-inspector's character was not given the analogous individual's name, which was Anthonysamy. Suriya said the film's team had no intention of hurting any individual or a particular community. He also said: "Through the film, questions have been raised against those in power, it should not be turned into name-politics and diluted".

Amid threats from supporters of the PMK and the Vanniyar Sangam, police protection was given to Suriya's residence in T. Nagar, Chennai. Film makers, including Vetrimaaran, Lokesh Kanagaraj, Pa. Ranjith, C. S. Amudhan, Prakash Raj—who appeared in the film, Sathyaraj and Siddharth publicly spoke in favour of Suriya, while associations such as South Indian Film Chamber of Commerce, Tamil Film Active Producers Association, and Nadigar Sangam raised objections to the attacks. The hashtag #WeStandWithSuriya started trending on Twitter, to which Suriya responded by thanking fans for their "overwhelming support". Gnanavel apologised on Twitter, saying he takes responsibility for the controversy and blaming Suriya was unfair. On 11 August 2022, Madras High Court quashed criminal proceedings against Suriya and Gnanavel for allegedly hurting the sentiment of the Vanniyar community in the film. The complainant said the film intended to incite violence and hostility on a particular community but the court said no such instance had been recorded.

A scene in which Prakash Raj's character IGP Perumalsamy slaps a pawnbroker for speaking in Hindi and tells him to speak in Tamil sparked controversy on social media and was opposed by Bharatiya Janata Party (BJP). Some commentators stated it promotes anti-Hindi sentiment while others said Perumalsamy slaps the pawnbroker for trying to confuse him and evade questioning by speaking in a language he does not understand when he can speak in Tamil. In response, Prakash Raj said the detractors did not empathise with the film's tribal characters or feel bad about the injustice they face, and since they only focused on the slap, it "exposes their agenda", but confirmed that the pawnbroker, who knows Tamil, was trying to evade questioning by speaking in Hindi.

Bharathiraja, then-president of Tamil Film Active Producers Association said:

Cinema has influenced and been a catalyst for social change on multiple occasions ... Jai Bhim is also one such creation that is part of efforts to instigate social change ... Viewing [Suriya] as someone who is against positive change in society or encouraging violence against him, is wrong and sets the wrong example. The best thing to do would be to let an art stand for itself without infringing the creators' artistic freedom. If this trend goes on, filmmakers will have to wait outside the houses of politicians to seek their approval before they could go ahead with a script and shoot a film.

== Legacy and impact ==
Justice K. Chandru, who was closely associated with the film from the story discussions to post-production work, stated in an interview with The Federal: "the film is not a mere retelling of Sengini's tragic tale, but is more about throwing light on the larger picture of the victimisation of vulnerable communities like the Irula tribe". M. K. Stalin, the Chief Minister of Tamil Nadu, praised the film, saying it had occupied his thoughts all night long. He stated the film's core issue reminded him of his own time in prison when arrested in 1976 under the Maintenance of Internal Security Act (1971) during the Emergency, and that his heart felt very heavy after watching the film. He congratulated Suriya and Gnanavel, and the entire film unit, saying he wished more such films were made. He complimented Suriya's donation of ₹10 million (US$100,000) to the Pazhangudi Irular Trust for their education. Responding to Stalin's compliments, Suriya said: "I am running out of words. The compliments of the Chief Minister have fulfilled the intent of Jai Bhim", and thanked the politician on behalf of the team. Suriya promised to open a fixed deposit of ₹10 lakh in the name of Parvati Ammal. He said: "The interest accrued for the FD will be handed over to Parvati Ammal every month and it will be ensured that the amount goes to her children after her death".

Jai Bhim was the most popular Indian film of 2021 according to IMDb. Jai Bhim also became the most-searched film of 2021 on Google in India. Raj Shinde, a critic at the Indian website ThePrint, cited Jai Bhim as an example of how Indian cinema evolved to produce anti-caste films. Several publications, including The Indian Express, The News Minute, Hindustan Times, Firstpost, and India Today, listed Jai Bhim as one of the best Tamil films of 2021. According to the social networking site Letterboxd, it was listed in the 15th position of "highest rated International films of 2021". It was also fourth in the list of films that were tweeted about most in 2021, according to a report published by Twitter. A scene from the film was listed on The Oscars' official YouTube channel as a part of the segment "Scene at the Academy", with T. J. Gnanavel talking about making the film. The film's screenplay was published as a book and was made available at the Chennai Book Fair in 2023.
