= T. J. Gnanavel =

Indian film director and screenwriter

- Born: 2 April; Chennai, Tamil Nadu, India
- Occupations: Film director, screenwriter
- Years active: 2010–present
- Notable work: Jai Bhim (2021)

T. J. Gnanavel is an Indian film director and screenwriter who works in the Tamil film industry.

== Early life and career ==
Gnanavel graduated from Loyola College, Chennai. He holds a PhD in Tamil literature, and worked as a journalist before his cinematic career.

Gnanavel made his debut as a dialogue writer for Raththa Sarithiram (2010) and Payanam (2011) before working as an assistant director. In 2017, he made his directorial debut with the comedy Kootathil Oruthan about an ordinary man, starring Ashok Selvan and Priya Anand, which released to average reviews. He received critical acclaim for his next film Jai Bhim (2021), which was based on a case handled by Justice K. Chandru. Gnanavel had interviewed Chandru before he handled the case while working for Ananda Vikatan. He later directed Vettaiyan (2024) starring Rajinikanth, and in the same year began working on Dosa King starring Mohanlal. However, that project ended up in development hell, and in 2026 Gnanavel was announced to be directing a separate film starring Suriya.

== Filmography ==
Key
| † | Denotes films that have not yet been released |

=== As film director ===
| Year | Film | Notes | Ref. |
|---|---|---|---|
| 2017 | Kootathil Oruthan | | |
| 2021 | Jai Bhim | | |
| 2024 | Vettaiyan | | |
| 2027 | Suriya 48 † | Filming | |

=== As dialogue writer ===
| Year | Film | Notes | Ref. |
|---|---|---|---|
| 2010 | Raththa Sarithiram | Wrote for Tamil version | |
| 2011 | Payanam | Wrote for Tamil version | |
| 2012 | Dhoni | Wrote for Tamil version | |
| 2014 | Un Samayal Arayil | Wrote for Tamil version | |
