= K. Chandru =

Indian judge

Hon'ble Justice K. Chandru
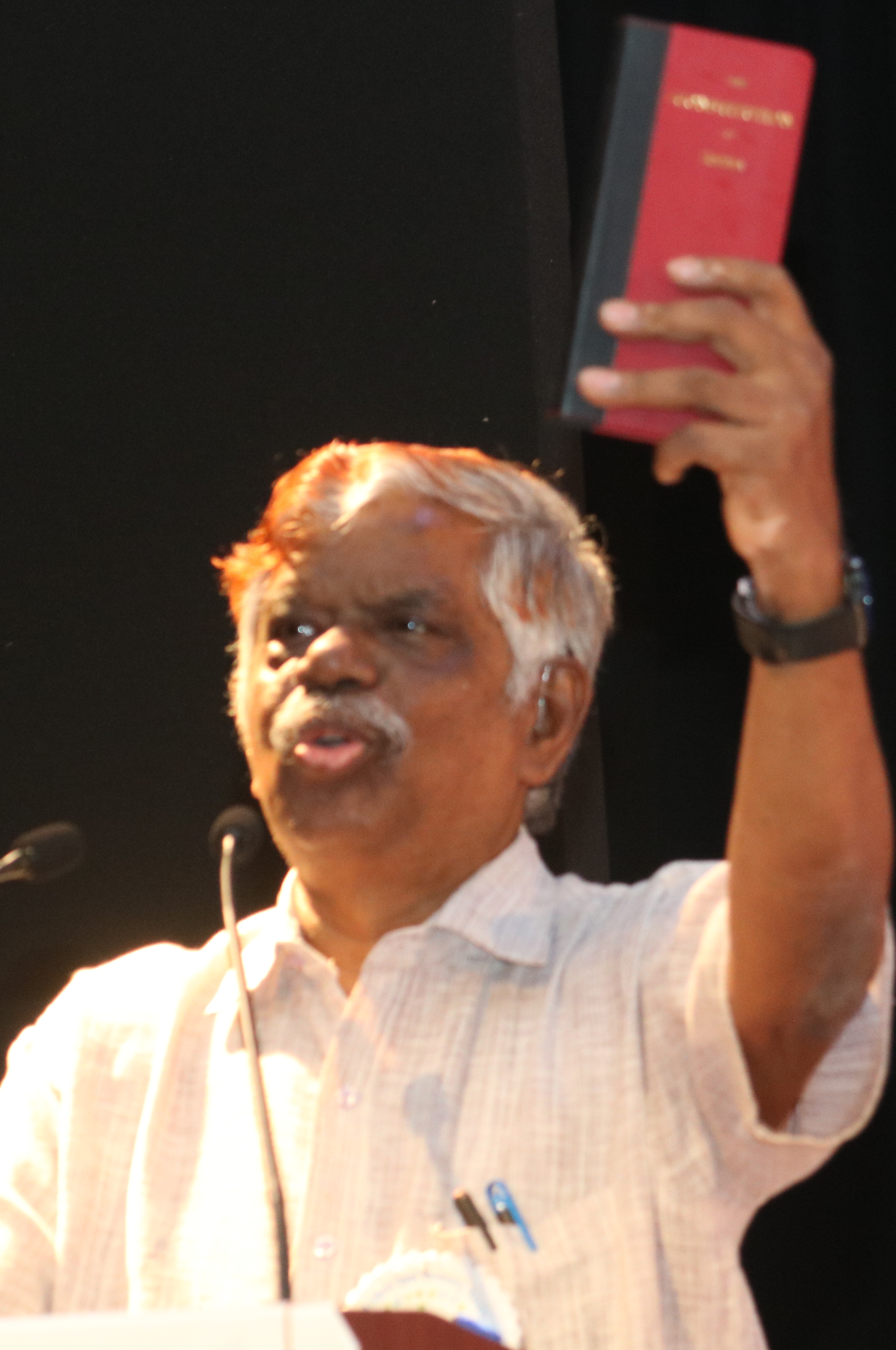

Judge of Madras High Court
- In office 31 July 2006 – 8 March 2014

Personal details
- Born: 8 May 1951 (age 75) Srirangam, Tamilnadu
- Spouse: Bharathi

Justice K. Chandru (born 1951) is an Indian advocate and former judge of Madras High Court who disposed of 96,000 cases during his tenure as a judge. Chandru is known for a case which took place in 1993 when he was practising as a lawyer, to which the film Jai Bhim (2021) is dedicated.

Justice chandru talk 2 at Kollam 2024

== Early life ==
Chandru was born in Srirangam in Tiruchirappalli District, Tamil Nadu. He was a former student activist of Communist Party of India (Marxist). He was expelled from Loyola College, Chennai for leading student agitations. He then joined Madras Christian College in his third year of college to finish his undergraduate education. After graduation, he did community service and full-time political and party work of CPI (M) till 1988. He later joined the law college in 1973 where he was not given a hostel seat due to him being a student leader, he later got his seat after going for an indefinite hunger strike in front of the college campus. Chandru then worked at a law firm, Row & Reddy, for eight years. He was expelled from the party in 1988 for opposing Indian intervention in the Sri Lankan Civil War since CPI(M) supported it. Chandru was inspired by B. R. Ambedkar.

== Career ==
K. Chandru as an advocate practiced both in criminal and civil side in the Madras High Court. He was made an Additional Judge of the High Court on 31 July 2006, and was made a permanent Judge on 9 November 2009. Justice K. Chandru was a well-respected judge among the judiciary and is known for his judgments that impacted the lives of many impoverished and downtrodden people. During his judicial career, Justice K. Chandru pronounced over 96,000 verdicts. He was known for fighting against caste discrimination and for the rights of backward communities in Tamil Nadu. He did not want a security guard and didn't want to be addressed as "My Lord" in courts. He retired as a judge in 2013 and did not accept a farewell. He now lives in Chennai.

== In popular culture ==
The 2021 movie Jai Bhim was made around a legal case fought by K. Chandru in 1993. Actor Suriya played the role of Chandru. Chandru was involved in the making of the film from the story discussion to post-production.

== Bibliography ==
- Ambedkar Oliyil Enathu Theerppukal (Light of Ambedkar in my judgments)
- Listen to My Case!: When Women Approach the Courts of Tamil Nadu Chandru, Justice K. (2021). Listen to My Case!: When Women Approach the Courts of Tamil Nadu. LeftWord Books. ISBN 978-81-944759-3-4.
- Needhi - Oru Meyadha Maan https://www.commonfolks.in/books/d/neethi-oru-meyaatha-maan
- Nanum Nithipathi Aanen An autobiography by K.Chandru
- Nanguneri Never... Ever Caste Violence in Educational Institutions
- Who Will Judge The Judges
- Neethi Thraikku Pinnae
