= Depressed Classes Mission =

Social reform organisation, founded 1906

- Bharatiya Nirashrit Sahayakari Mandali
- Formation: October 1906
- Founder: Vitthal Ramji Shinde
- Type: Social reform organisation
- Purpose: Upliftment of untouchable communities
- Location: India

The Depressed Classes Mission, also known as Bharatiya Nirashrit Sahayakari Mandali, was an organization founded in October 1906 by Vitthal Ramji Shinde. The primary objective of the institution was to establish a permanent, large-scale, and structured framework for the upliftment of untouchable communities. It operated on the core philosophy that the elevation of untouchables was a moral obligation of the touchable caste society.

== Background ==
The practice of untouchability within Hindu society was historically an inhuman and unjust practice, leaving affected communities in a degraded and miserable state for centuries. Awareness regarding this issue grew among everyone after the stabilization of British rule. Initial sympathy was expressed by various intellectuals across different provinces.

Around 1850, Jyotirao Phule initiated direct actions in Maharashtra to improve the conditions of untouchables by establishing schools for children and girls, as well as opening his personal water tank to them. However, because these individual efforts were deemed insufficient, a clear necessity arose for a more organized and institutionalized approach, leading to the creation of the Depressed Classes Mission.

== Objectives and expansion ==
The mission aimed to secure better treatment for untouchables, provide them with education, enhance their economic status through employment opportunities, and execute programs for their cultural advancement.

Within its first two years, the organization expanded significantly. It received active assistance from the Prarthana Samaj. The mission grew to encompass 14 branches spanning from Bombay to Madras in the south and Indore in the north. It established 24 schools and 5 hostels, catering to 1,100 students with a staff of 55 teachers. Over time, branches and schools were also set up in several other cities, including Satara, Mahabaleshwar, Dapoli, Mangalore, Hubli, Akola, Amravati, and Bhavnagar.

While the mission worked extensively for untouchable communities, the majority of its high-ranking office-bearers belonged to the privileged caste society.

== Conferences ==
The mission organized major conventions to address social discrimination:

- 1912 Poona Conference: Presided over by Dr. Bhandarkar, this was the first major untouchability eradication conference held by the institution. It saw participation from prominent upper-caste figures, including Dr. Kurlakoti and the ruler of Ichalkaranji. The event gained significance as it brought together various untouchable groups (such as Mahar, Mang, Chamar, and Bhangi), Hindu castes (like Brahmins and Marathas), as well as Christian and Muslim participants.
- 1918 Bombay Conference: An All India Untouchability Eradication Conference was organized under the presidency of Sayajirao Gaekwad III, the King of Baroda. Prominent leaders such as Lokmanya Tilak, Annie Besant, and Mahatma Gandhi attended. While most notable attendees signed a pledge to abolish untouchability, Lokmanya Tilak declined to sign, introducing a resolution instead that the National Congress should handle the issue. Subsequently, during the 1920 Congress session, the Congress formally backed untouchability eradication efforts under the leadership of Mahatma Gandhi.

== Later developments and decline ==
The founder, Vitthal Ramji Shinde (also referred to as Karmaveer), intentionally included untouchable members in various local committees and publicly advocated that the community should take charge of their own upliftment. However, Shinde frequently faced disappointment due to a lack of empathy from the British administration, internal disagreements and subsequent inactivity within the National Congress, and misunderstandings within the untouchable community itself. Consequently, in 1923, he stepped down from his active responsibilities within the mission, though his dedication to the cause remained unchanged.

In 1930, a separate organization named the Depressed Classes Congress was convened under the leadership of B. R. Ambedkar. This new leadership offered a more intense social and political program, which increasingly drew the untouchable community toward Ambedkar. Following these political shifts, the Depressed Classes Mission gradually lost its foundational influence and became nominal. In 1933, Shinde transferred control of the mission's Pune branch to Dalit leaders and limited his own role to that of a trustee.
