= Vitthal Ramji Shinde =

Indian social reformer (1873–1944)

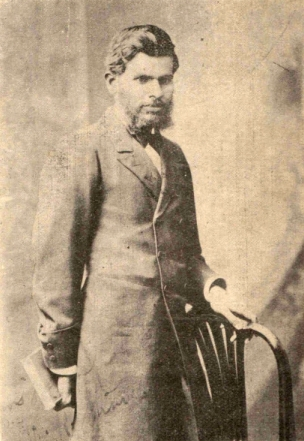
- Born: Vitthal Ramji Shinde; 23 April 1873; Jamkhandi, British India (now Karnataka)
- Died: 2 January 1944 (aged 70); Bombay Province, British India
- Education: Fergusson College (BA)
- Occupations: Writer; researcher
- Organization: Depressed Classes Mission
- Known for: Social Reformer; Missionary

Vitthal Ramji Shinde (23 April 1873 – 2 January 1944) was an Indian scholar, writer, and social reformer. He worked against the institution of untouchability and advocated religious and social reforms in the British Raj. Shinde was associated with the liberal reformist tradition in India and contributed to discussions on caste and Dalit rights.

== Personal life ==
Shinde was born on 23 April 1873 in the princely state of Jamkhandi (present-day Karnataka) into a Maratha family.

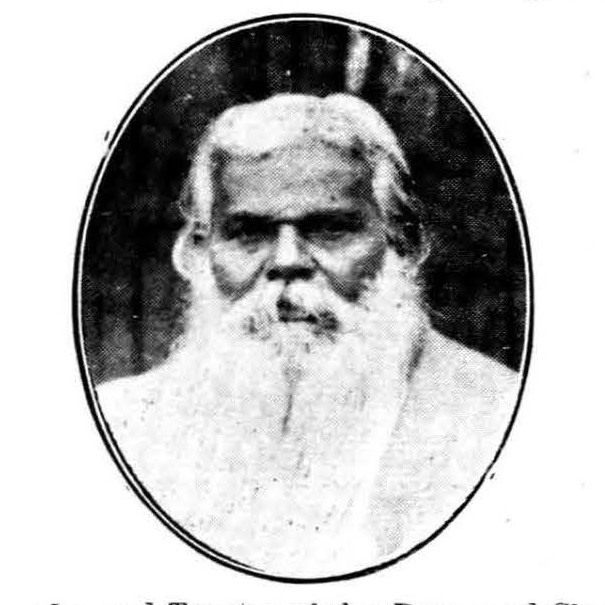
Vitthal Ramji Shinde in 1938

Around 1898, Shinde joined Prarthana Samaj, a monotheistic prayer society that advocated for progressive social reform. Shinde's religious views were influenced by the works of Sant Tukaram, Sant Eknath, and Sant Ramdas. He also studied the writings of John Stuart Mill, Herbert Spencer, Max Müller, Mahadev Govind Ranade, and R. G. Bhandarkar. In 1903, he began working as a preacher at the Mumbai Prarthana Samaj, where he facilitated lectures and reading groups in addition to publishing his religious writings. His association with Prarthana Samaj ended in 1910; in 1923, Shinde began teaching at a Brahmo school, remaining a devout Brahmo through the rest of his life.

Shinde died on 2 January 1944, at the age of 70, in Bombay Province.

== Education ==
In 1898, Shinde earned a Bachelor of Arts degree from Fergusson College, Pune.

In 1901, with the financial support of Maharaja Sayajirao Gaekwad III of Baroda State, Shinde traveled to Manchester College, Oxford to study comparative religion. For two years, he studied comparative theology, Christian and Buddhist religious history, the Pali language, and sociology. He continued to publish academic works throughout his life, including several essays about the history and circumstances of sects deemed untouchable; after his death, his research was compiled into various volumes spanning his religious, sociological, and autobiographical work.

== Career ==
After returning to India in 1903, Shinde became active in efforts against caste-based discrimination. He focused on education and social welfare initiatives for the Depressed Classes. In 1905, he opened a night school for Dalit and untouchable children in Pune.

On 16 October 1906, he founded the Depressed Classes Mission in Bombay to provide social and educational support for groups including the Mahars, Chamars, and Namasudras. To accomplish this, the society worked to oppose untouchability, provide education to Dalit communities, and establish schools, hostels, and healthcare facilities.

Shinde established the Murali Pratibandhak Sabha or "Murali Prohibition Council" in 1910, and later convened the Asprushyata Nivaran Parishad (Untouchability Eradication Council) in 1912. In 1917, Shinde played a role in passing a resolution at the Indian National Congress condemning the practice of untouchability.

Between 1918 and 1920, Shinde was involved in organising conferences on untouchability, chaired by leaders including Mahatma Gandhi and Sayajirao Gaekwad III. He also presented evidence before the Southborough Franchise Committee in 1919, advocating for political representation of marginalised castes. In 1923, he resigned from the executive of the Depressed Classes Mission due to internal disagreements, but he remained associated with its objectives.

During the 1920 Bombay Presidency Council elections, which he contested from Pune, Shinde published a Marathi-language article titled Bahujan Paksh in Baroda's Jagruti Patra. The article served as a political statement and outlined the objectives of the Bahujan Samaj Paksha, a party representing socially and economically disadvantaged groups in Indian society.

In 1930, for his participation in the Civil Disobedience Movement, Shinde was imprisoned for six months in Yerwada Central Jail.

== Additional works ==
- Dr. G.M. Pawar, English translation by Sudhakar Marathe, *The Life and Work of Maharshi Vitthal Ramji Shinde*, Sahitya Akademi, 2013. ISBN 978-81-260-4064-3
- M.S. Gore, *Vitthal Ramji Shinde: An Assessment of His Contribution*, Tata Institute of Social Sciences, 1989.
- G.M. Pawar, *Maharshi Vitthal Ramji Shinde: Jeevan wa Karya* (Marathi), 2004. ISBN 81-88284-37-8
- Katare, *Maharashtra History*, 2013 edition.
