= Jai Bhim =

Slogan used by followers of an Indian politician

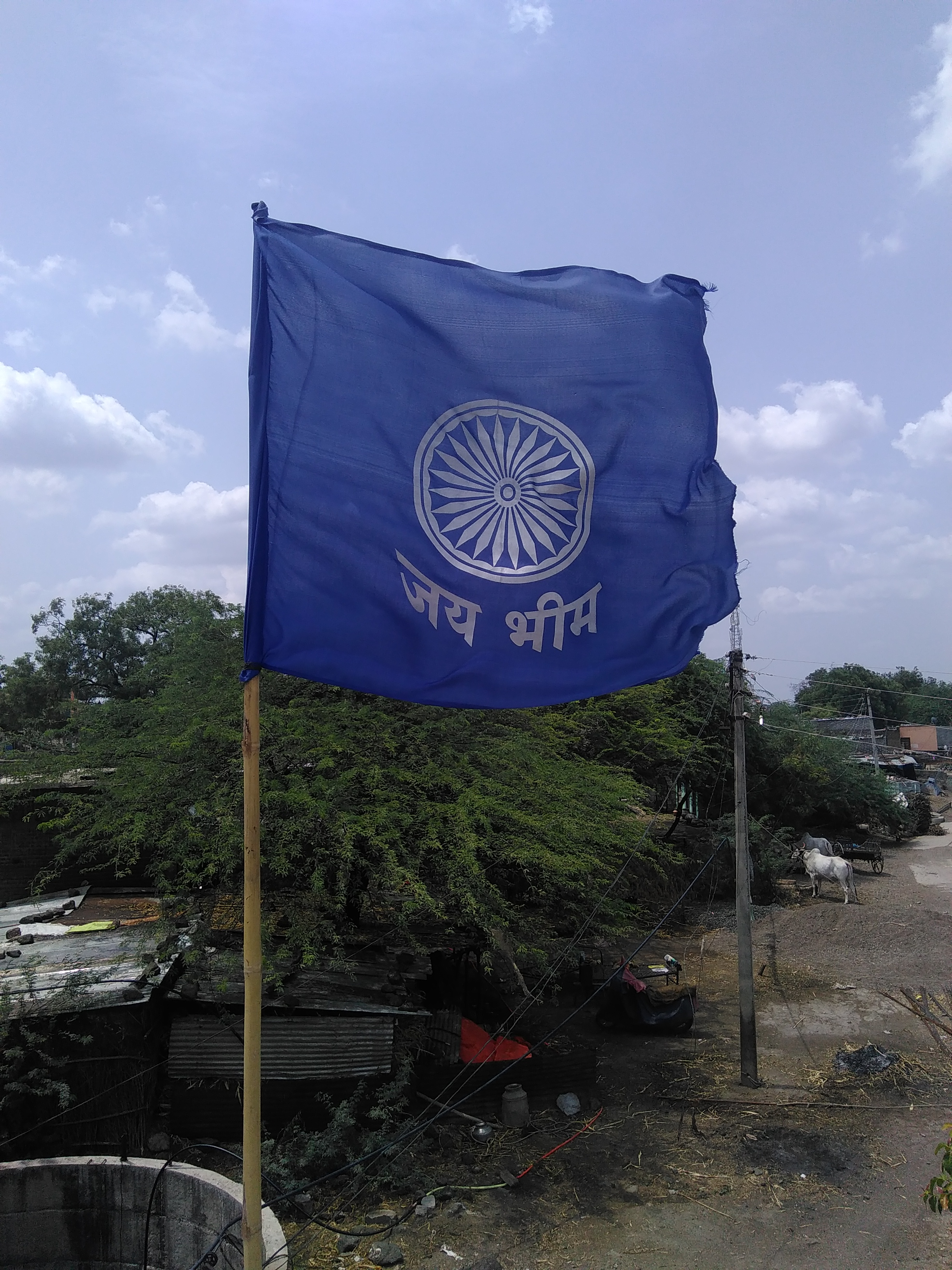
Slogan Jay Bhim on Dalit flag

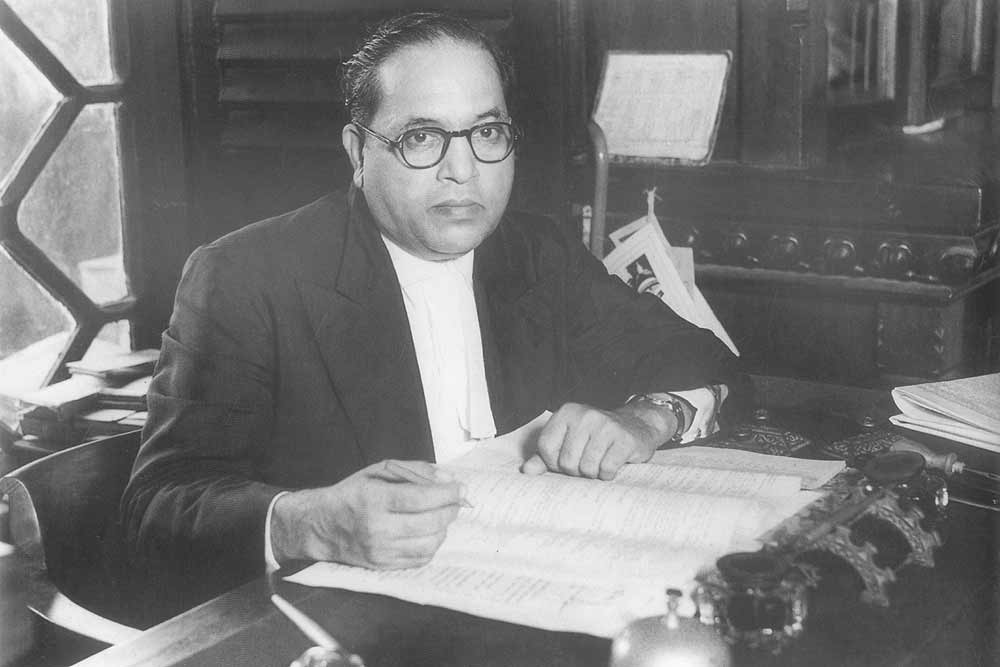
This salutation honours B. R. Ambedkar, an Indian academic turned politician.

Jai Bhim (alternatively spelled Jay Bhim or Jai Bheem; transl. "Victory for Bhim", "Long live Bhim" or "Hail Bhim"; pronounced [d͡ʒəj bʱiːm] or [d͡ʒɛː bʱiːm]) is a slogan and greeting used by followers of B. R. Ambedkar, an Indian politician, social reformer and first Law and Justice Minister of India. It refers to Ambedkar's given name Bhim or Bhimrao. In 1935, Jai Bhim was conceived and developed by Babu L. N. Hardas (1904–1939), a staunch follower of Ambedkar, and the secretary of Samata Sainik Dal. However, its origin is obscure and may date as far back as 1818, well before Ambedkar's birth.

Jai Bhim is also called as a slogan by some political parties like the Bahujan Samaj Party (BSP), Republican Party of India (RPI).

== History ==
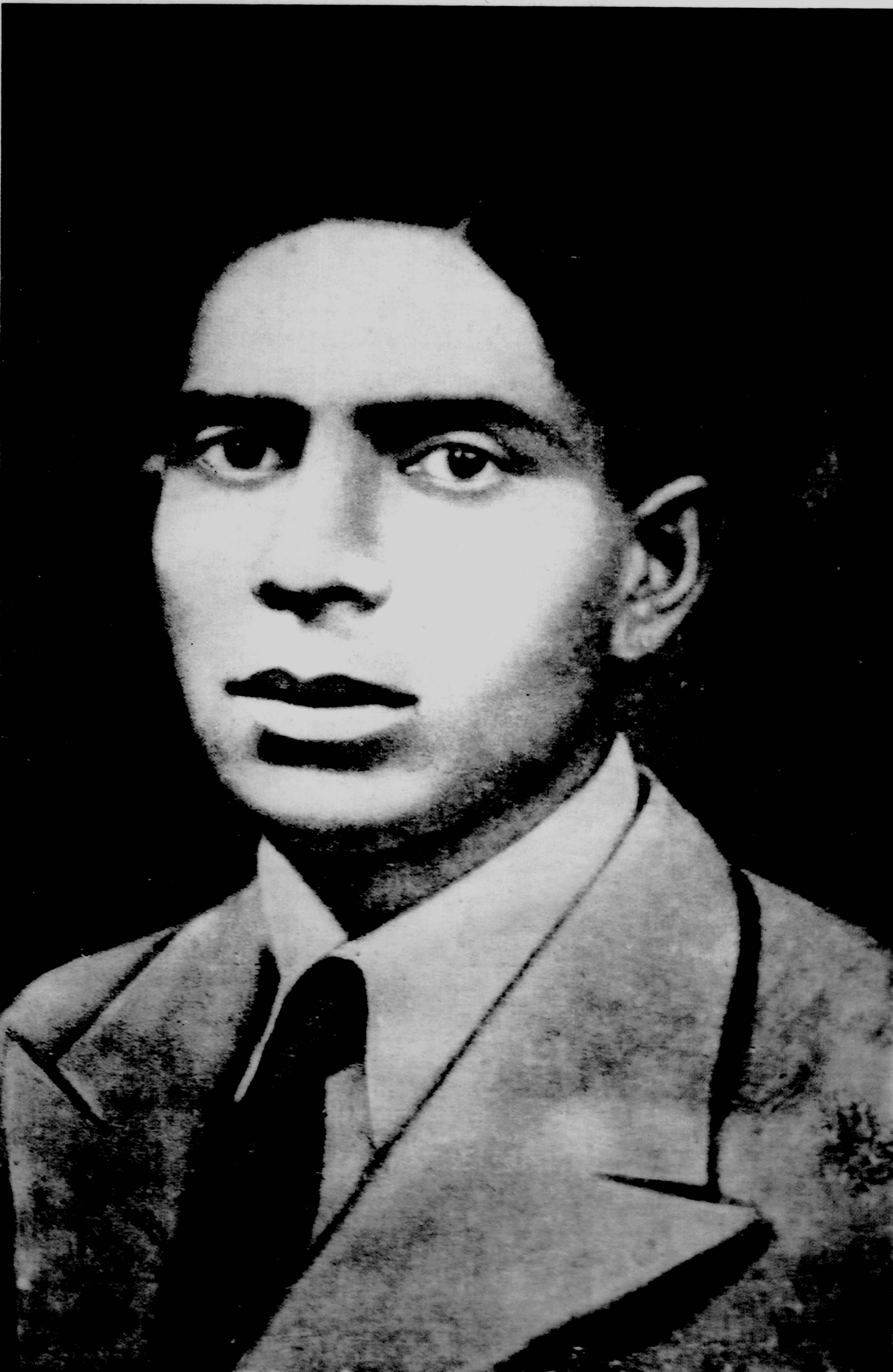
Babu Hardas

In 1935, the slogan 'Jai Bhim' was coined by Babu Hardas L. N. (Laxman Nagarale), according to Ramchandra Kshirsagar in the book Dalit Movement in India and Its Leaders. In 1938, Bhausaheb More, an activist of the Ambedkarite movement, held a meeting in Makranpur in Kannad taluka of Aurangabad district. Dr. Babasaheb Ambedkar was also present. More told the people that, from now on, they should use only 'Jai Bhim' to greet each other. Suresh Ghorpade, a former judge and scholar of the Dalit movement, said, "The salutation 'Jai Bhim' started during Dr. Ambedkar's lifetime. Activists of the Ambedkarite movement used to call each other 'Jai Bhim', but some activists also directly salutated Dr. Ambedkar as 'Jai Bhim'."

Narendra Jadhav said, "The slogan of Jai Bhim was given by Babu Hardas. It is an important triumph for all Dalits. 'Jai Bhim' has become a symbol of struggle, it has become a cultural identity as well as a political identity, it also shows the relationship with the Ambedkarite movement, this utterance has become a symbol of all kinds of identities. I think 'Jai Bhim' has become the overall identity of the revolution," said Uttam Kamble.

In 1946, during birthday celebrations for Dr. Bhimrao Ambedkar, for the time in the presence of Dr. Ambedkar, Jai Bhim was proclaimed by Dalit Poet Bihari Lal Harit (1913–1999) through a poem in Gandhi Ground, opposite Old Delhi Railway Station.

== In popular culture ==
- Several Marathi songs feature the phrase 'Jai Bhim'.
- This phrase is used in the title of the 2018 Indian film Bole India, Jai Bhim, which is based on the life of Babu Hardas, a Dalit rights activist.
- This slogan is used as a title of the 2021 Tamil film Jai Bhim, which tells the story of a lawyer's fight for justice for a marginalized tribal man.
- On 24 June 2024, in the Parliament of India, nearly two dozen MPs—Dalits, OBCs, Muslims, and Tribals from various political parties such as Congress, Samajwadi Party, and others—concluded their oath-taking ceremony with the slogan 'Jai Bhim'.

== See also ==
- Jai Bhim Comrade
- Jai Bhim (2021 film)
