= Boston International Film Festival =

The Boston International Film Festival is a film festival in the United States held in Boston, Massachusetts which showcases over 90 films annually.

Established in 2003 by film producer Patrick Jerome, the festival features independent films from around the world and the U.S. Since its beginnings, the Festival has presented many acclaimed films including Academy Award winner for short film West Bank Story. The program includes feature films, short films and documentaries.

The festival returned for its 21st annual year in April 2023, featuring films from 30 countries.
