= List of accolades received by Pushpa: The Rise =

Accolades
Award	Won	Nominated
Filmfare Awards South	7	8
National Film Awards	2	2
Nickelodeon Kids' Choice Awards India	3	3
Mirchi Music Awards	1	2
Santosham Film Awards	6	6
South Indian International Movie Awards	7	13
- Total number of awards and nominations (Note: Awards in certain categories do not have prior nominations and only winners are announced by the jury. For simplification and to avoid errors, each award in this list has been presumed to have had a prior nomination.)
Totals	44	52
- References

Pushpa: The Rise is a 2021 Indian Telugu-language action drama film written and directed by Sukumar, and produced by Mythri Movie Makers and Muttamsetty Media. The film stars Allu Arjun in the title role. It also stars Fahadh Faasil alongside Rashmika Mandanna, Jagadeesh Prathap Bandari, Dhananjaya, Sunil, and Ajay Ghosh.

Made on a budget of ₹200–250 crore, the film was released on 17 December 2021. The film received generally mixed reviews from critics and was commercially successful at the box-office, grossing over ₹360–393.50 crore worldwide. It became the highest-grossing Indian film of 2021, and ranks among the highest-grossing Telugu films of all time.

At the 69th National Film Awards, Pushpa: The Rise won two awards – Best Actor (Arjun) and Best Music Direction (Prasad). At the 67th Filmfare Awards South, it won seven awards meant for Telugu films, including Best Film, Best Director (Sukumar) and Best Actor (Arjun).

== Accolades ==
Award (Note: Awards, festivals and organizations are in alphabetical order.)	Date of ceremony (Note: Date is linked to the article about the awards held that year, wherever possible.)	Category	Recipient(s)	Result	Ref.
Bollywood Film Journalist Awards	28 June 2022	Best Screenplay	Sukumar	Won	
Bollywood Film Journalist Awards	28 June 2022	Best Dialogue	Srikanth Vissa	Won	
Bollywood Film Journalist Awards	28 June 2022	Best Music	Devi Sri Prasad	Won	
Bollywood Film Journalist Awards	28 June 2022	Best Sound Effect	Resul Pookutty	Won	
Bollywood Film Journalist Awards	28 June 2022	Best Male Singer	Javed Ali – (for "Srivalli")	Won	
Bollywood Film Journalist Awards	28 June 2022	Best Choreographer	Ganesh Acharya – (for "Oo Antava Oo Oo Antava")	Won	
GAMA Awards	3 March 2024	Best Movie	Naveen Yerneni, Y. Ravi Shankar	Won	
GAMA Awards	3 March 2024	Best Director	Sukumar	Won	
GAMA Awards	3 March 2024	Best Actor	Allu Arjun	Won	
GAMA Awards	3 March 2024	Best Music Director	Devi Sri Prasad	Won	
GAMA Awards	3 March 2024	Best Popular Song	Mounika Yadav – (for "Saami Saami")	Won	
Filmfare Awards South	9 October 2022	Best Film – Telugu	Naveen Yerneni, Y. Ravi Shankar	Won	
Filmfare Awards South	9 October 2022	Best Director – Telugu	Sukumar	Won	
Filmfare Awards South	9 October 2022	Best Actor – Telugu	Allu Arjun	Won	
Filmfare Awards South	9 October 2022	Best Actress – Telugu	Rashmika Mandanna	Nominated	
Filmfare Awards South	9 October 2022	Best Music Director – Telugu	Devi Sri Prasad	Won	
Filmfare Awards South	9 October 2022	Best Playback Singer – Male	Sid Sriram – (for "Srivalli")	Won	
Filmfare Awards South	9 October 2022	Best Playback Singer – Female	Indravathi Chauhan – (for "Oo Antava Oo Oo Antava")	Won	
Filmfare Awards South	9 October 2022	Best Cinematographer – Telugu	Miroslaw Kuba Brozek	Won	
Mirchi Music Awards	8 March 2022	Male Vocalist of The Year	Javed Ali – (for "Srivalli")	Won	
Mirchi Music Awards	8 March 2022	Female Vocalist of The Year	Sunidhi Chauhan – (for "Saami Saami")	Nominated	
National Film Awards	24 August 2023	Best Actor	Allu Arjun	Won	
National Film Awards	24 August 2023	Best Music Direction – Songs	Devi Sri Prasad	Won	
Nickelodeon Kids' Choice Awards India	27 March 2022	Favorite Movie – South	Pushpa: The Rise	Won	
Nickelodeon Kids' Choice Awards India	27 March 2022	Favorite Movie Actor – South	Allu Arjun	Won	
Nickelodeon Kids' Choice Awards India	27 March 2022	Favorite Movie Actress – South	Rashmika Mandanna	Won	
Sakshi Excellence Awards	21 October 2022	Most Popular Movie	Naveen Yerneni, Y. Ravi Shankar	Won	
Sakshi Excellence Awards	21 October 2022	Most Popular Director	Sukumar	Won	
Sakshi Excellence Awards	21 October 2022	Most Popular Actor	Allu Arjun	Won	
Sakshi Excellence Awards	21 October 2022	Most Popular Actress	Rashmika Mandanna	Won	
Sakshi Excellence Awards	21 October 2022	Most Popular Music Director	Devi Sri Prasad	Won	
Sakshi Excellence Awards	21 October 2022	Most Popular Lyricist	Chandrabose – (for "Srivalli")	Won	
Sakshi Excellence Awards	21 October 2022	Most Popular Singer – Male	Sid Sriram – (for "Srivalli")	Won	
Sakshi Excellence Awards	21 October 2022	Most Popular Singer – Female	Indravathi Chauhan – (for "Oo Antava Oo Oo Antava")	Won	
Santosham Film Awards	26 December 2022	Best Film	Naveen Yerneni, Y. Ravi Shankar	Won	
Santosham Film Awards	26 December 2022	Best Director	Sukumar	Won	
Santosham Film Awards	26 December 2022	Best Actor	Allu Arjun	Won	
Santosham Film Awards	26 December 2022	Best Music Director	Devi Sri Prasad	Won	
Santosham Film Awards	26 December 2022	Best Female Playback Singer	Indravathi Chauhan – (for "Oo Antava Oo Oo Antava")	Won	
Santosham Film Awards	26 December 2022	Best Lyricist	Chandrabose	Won	
South Indian International Movie Awards	10 September 2022	Best Film – Telugu	Mythri Movie Makers, Muttamsetty Media	Won	
South Indian International Movie Awards	10 September 2022	Best Director – Telugu	Sukumar	Won	
South Indian International Movie Awards	10 September 2022	Best Cinematographer – Telugu	Miroslaw Kuba Brozek	Nominated	
South Indian International Movie Awards	10 September 2022	Best Actor – Telugu	Allu Arjun	Won	
South Indian International Movie Awards	10 September 2022	Best Actress – Telugu	Rashmika Mandanna	Nominated	
South Indian International Movie Awards	10 September 2022	Best Supporting Actor – Telugu	Jagadeesh Prathap Bandari	Won	
South Indian International Movie Awards	10 September 2022	Best Actor in a Negative Role – Telugu	Sunil	Nominated	
South Indian International Movie Awards	10 September 2022	Best Music Director – Telugu	Devi Sri Prasad	Won	
South Indian International Movie Awards	10 September 2022	Best Lyricist – Telugu	Chandrabose – (for "Srivalli")	Won	
South Indian International Movie Awards	10 September 2022	Best Male Playback Singer – Telugu	Sid Sriram – (for "Srivalli")	Nominated	
South Indian International Movie Awards	10 September 2022	Best Female Playback Singer – Telugu	Mounika Yadav – (for "Saami Saami")	Nominated	
South Indian International Movie Awards	10 September 2022	Best Female Playback Singer – Telugu	Indravathi Chauhan – (for "Oo Antava Oo Oo Antava")	Nominated	
South Indian International Movie Awards	10 September 2022	Special Jury Award for Best Production Design	S. Rama Krishna and Monika Niggotre S.	Won	

== See also ==
- List of Telugu films of 2021
- Pushpa: The Rise (soundtrack)
