= Pushpa =

Pushpa may refer to:

== Arts and entertainment ==
- Pushpa (film series), an Indian film series created by Sukumar
  - Pushpa: The Rise, a 2021 Indian Telugu-language action-drama film by Sukumar
    - Pushpa: The Rise (soundtrack), soundtrack for the film by Devi Sri Prasad
  - Pushpa 2: The Rule, a 2024 Indian Telugu-language film, sequel to the 2021 film
    - Pushpa 2: The Rule (soundtrack), its soundtrack by Devi Sri Prasad
  - Pushpa 3: The Rampage, an upcoming Indian Telugu-language film, sequel to the 2021 and 2024 films
- Pushpa Impossible, a 2022 Indian television drama series
- Pushpanjali, a 1972 Indian Malayalam-language film by J. Sasikumar
- Pushpasharam, a 1976 Indian Malayalam-language film by J. Sasikumar

== People ==
- Maitreyi Pushpa (born 1944), Indian freelance writer
- Pushpa Devi Singh (born 1948), Indian politician associated with the National Congress Party
- Pushpa Kamal Dahal (born 1954) Nepalese politician and former Prime minister of Nepal
- Pushpa Lal Shrestha (1924–1978), the founding general secretary of the Communist Party of Nepal
- Pushpa Pradhan (born 1981), a member of the India women's national field-hockey team
- Pushpa Raj Pokharel, Nepalese politician belonging to the CPN (UML)
- Pushpa Thangadurai (1921-2013), Tamil-language author of religious pilgrimage travelogues

== See also ==
- Pushpaka (disambiguation)
