= Pushpa (film series) =

Indian film series

- Series logo
- Directed by: Sukumar
- Written by: Story and Screenplay: Sukumar; Dialogue: Srikanth Vissa
- Produced by: Naveen Yerneni; Yalamanchili Ravi Shankar
- Starring: Allu Arjun; Rashmika Mandanna; Fahadh Faasil; Jagadeesh Prathap Bandari; Sunil; Anasuya Bharadwaj; Dhananjaya; Ajay Ghosh; Rao Ramesh; Jagapathi Babu
- Cinematography: Miroslaw Kuba Brozek
- Edited by: Karthika Srinivas; Ruben (Pushpa: The Rise); Naveen Nooli (Pushpa 2: The Rule)
- Music by: Devi Sri Prasad
- Production companies: Mythri Movie Makers; Muttamsetty Media; Sukumar Writings
- Distributed by: Mythri Movie Makers (Telugu) (1 & 2); Lyca Productions and Sri Lakshmi Movies (Tamil) (1); AGS Entertainment (Tamil) (2); Goldmines Telefilms and AA Films (Hindi) (1); AA Films (Hindi) (2); Swagath Enterprises (Kannada) (1); N Cinemas (Kannada) (2); Prithviraj Productions (Malayalam) (1); E4 Entertainment (Malayalam) (2)
- Release dates: 17 December 2021 (Pushpa: The Rise); 5 December 2024 (Pushpa 2: The Rule)
- Running time: 403 minutes (2 films)
- Country: India
- Language: Telugu
- Budget: ₹750–835 crore (2 films)
- Box office: ₹2,002–2,193.5 crore (2 films) (Note: News 18 Telugu mentioned it as ₹360 crores. While The Times of India reported the collection to be ₹365 crore.) (Note: Pushpa 2's reported worldwide grosses vary between ₹1,642 crore (The Hans India) – ₹1,800 crore (Deccan Chronicle; The Indian Express).)

Pushpa is an Indian Telugu-language action drama film series created by Sukumar and produced by Mythri Movie Makers, Muttamsetty Media and Sukumar Writings. The series stars Allu Arjun in the titular role, alongside an ensemble cast. Pushpa Raj is a laborer who rises through the ranks of a red sandalwood smuggling syndicate in the late 1990s. He starts out working for a small sum, but dreams of a better life. Pushpa franchise is the Fourth-highest-grossing Indian film franchise.

The first installment, Pushpa: The Rise, was released on 17 December 2021 and became the highest-grossing Indian film of 2021. The second installment, Pushpa 2: The Rule, was released on 5 December 2024. The sequel broke several opening day records and became the highest day-one grossing film ever in India. It eventually emerged as the highest-grossing Indian film of 2024, second-highest-grossing Telugu film, and the third-highest-grossing Indian film of all time.

== Films ==
Film	Release date	Director	Screenwriter(s)	Story by	Producer(s)
Pushpa: The Rise	17 December 2021	Sukumar	Sukumar, Srikanth Vissa	Sukumar	Naveen Yerneni, Yalamanchili Ravi Shankar
Pushpa 2: The Rule	5 December 2024	Sukumar	Sukumar, Srikanth Vissa	Sukumar	Naveen Yerneni, Yalamanchili Ravi Shankar
Pushpa 3: The Rampage	TBA	Sukumar	Sukumar, Srikanth Vissa	Sukumar	Naveen Yerneni, Yalamanchili Ravi Shankar

=== Pushpa: The Rise (2021) ===
Pushpa Raj "Pushpa" is the only son of Parvathamma, a mistress to a village head at a village in Chittoor. Ostracised from his paternal family, Pushpa grows up to be a labourer, working for the illegal traders of red sandalwood. He rises through their ranks quickly, learning the tricks of the trade. Pushpa gradually becomes the trusted aide of a deadly goon, Konda Reddy. Mangalam Srinu, a man who minces no words and means business, is a crucial link to the business of Reddy and his men. How does Pushpa chart his growth as a red sandalwood baron and rise above them?

=== Pushpa 2: The Rule (2024) ===
After his head-on confrontation with Bhanwar Singh Shekhawat in the first part, Pushpa rises to become the undisputed king of the sandalwood smuggling world. His power grows to the extent that he manages to install his close aide as the Chief Minister of the state. However, challenges arise when Bhanwar Singh Shekhawat, Mangalam Srinu, and Pratap Reddy emerge as significant obstacles, threatening Pushpa both personally and professionally. How Pushpa overcomes them and emerges victorious forms the crux of Pushpa 2.

=== Pushpa 3: The Rampage (TBA) ===
Shortly after the release of Pushpa 2: The Rule, Sukumar confirmed that he and Allu Arjun would return for a third and final film in the series in future.

The Pushpa 2: The Rule post-credits scene showcased the continuation of the story with a cliffhanger and the title for the third and final part revealed as Pushpa 3: The Rampage.

== Development ==
Post the success of Rangasthalam (2018), Sukumar narrated a script to Mahesh Babu, with whom he previously worked in 1: Nenokkadine (2014). Babu, who liked the story, gave a nod to the project, and was reported to start the shoot after completing Vamshi Paidipally's project Maharshi (2019). In mid-April 2018, Mythri Movie Makers, which collaborated with Sukumar in their previous film Rangasthalam, officially announced the project which was tentatively titled as #SSMB26, thus marking their second collaboration with Babu and Sukumar. (Note: Mythri Movie Makers, made their debut in film production, with Mahesh Babu's Srimanthudu (2015)) The film was expected to begin in January 2019, but, in that March, Babu walked out of Sukumar's project citing creative differences, and he confirmed this through Twitter. The actor instead signed his next project with Anil Ravipudi titled as Sarileru Neekevvaru, whereas Sukumar approached Allu Arjun for his next film, marking his reunion with the director after a decade since Arya 2 (2009); Mythri Movie Makers which earlier associated with Babu and Sukumar's project also agreed to produce the venture.

Speaking with Press Trust of India, Sukumar said: "with Mahesh Babu, I couldn't make him cool. He is very fair. So, the backdrop was the same but the story is different."

Sukumar described the storyline as follows: "the red sanders heist in the hills of Andhra is a convoluted nexus that unfurls in the course of the narrative through a coolie-turned-smuggler. Sukumar explored the subject of red sandalwood smuggling when he read about such incidents in Andhra Pradesh years ago. Sukumar did his research and thought of developing the project as a web series. However, he later decided to make it as a feature film. He personally went for location scouting across Nallamala Hills as the film is set in Rayalaseema and Nellore and the plot revolves around red sanders smuggling. Since most of the film takes place in a rural backdrop, Allu Arjun was reported to have learned the Chittoor accent for the film, and the makers hired a team from Bollywood to work on his look. The story is set against the backdrop of Seshachalam forest, located in the hilly region of Tirumala.

The film's title Pushpa was officially announced on 8 April 2020, on the occasion of Allu Arjun's birthday and a poster was also released. Before the release of Pushpa: The Rise in 2021, the film was announced to release in two parts, with the filmmakers stating that the maiden part would release that year, whereas the latter part would release the year after (2022). Initially, 10% of the sequel's footage was shot back-to-back with the first part, however, Sukumar decided to alter the sequel's story to reportedly fulfill the audience's anticipation and correct the previous film's mistakes. The scripting part of the film was completed by July 2022 in Hyderabad. The official title, Pushpa 2: The Rule, was announced on 22 August 2022. An inaugural muhurat puja ceremony was held on the same day in Hyderabad with the presence of the film's cast and crew.

=== Casting ===
Allu Arjun played the titular character Pushpa Raj, a red-sandalwood smuggler, and sported a bearded look for his role in the film. Rashmika Mandanna was cast as the film's lead actress, with an official announcement made on Allu Arjun's birthday (8 April 2019). Mandanna in an online interaction confirmed that she will be learning a new dialect for the film, like Arjun, which is slightly based on the dialect of Chittoor. Jisshu Sengupta was originally offered to play the antagonist but he refused due to the ongoing COVID-19 pandemic and time constraints. Vijay Sethupathi entered talks to play the antagonist in October 2019, having worked with Sukumar in the director's production venture Uppena (2021), and was confirmed to be part of the film in January 2020. However, in July 2020, Sethupathi left the film citing scheduling conflicts. Post Sethupathi's exit, Vikram, Bobby Simha, Madhavan and Arya were reported to be playing negative roles in the film, but ultimately Malayalam actor Fahadh Faasil was announced as the film's antagonist in March 2021, thus marking his debut in Telugu cinema. For his role in the film, Fahadh sported a bald look and a rough moustache.

Kannada actor Dhananjaya was reported to be playing a pivotal role in April 2020. In November 2020, Sunil was cast in a supporting role and was present in the film's second schedule. Sunil's character was reported to have grey shades in the film. Though it was reported that Anasuya Bharadwaj was playing a crucial role, she later clarified that she wasn't approached for the film. However, Bharadwaj joined the film's shooting in April 2021. In July 2021, Sritej confirmed that he was cast in the role of Pushpa Raj's brother. The film had three antagonists, with Sunil and Anasuya, being the antagonists in the first part, while Fahadh's character, Bhanwar Singh Shekhawat, the main antagonist, will appear only at the end of the first part and will continue throughout its sequel. Jagadeesh was cast by Sukumar after he watched his performances in the films Mallesham (2019) and George Reddy (2019). In an interview, Jagadeesh Prathap Bandari revealed that he had left 15 smaller projects for working in the film. Samantha joined the production in late-November 2021. She shot for the item song "Oo Antava Oo Oo Antava" alongside Allu Arjun and others.

For the second part, Jagapathi Babu was roped in for a pivotal role in April 2023 while Sreeleela was finalised for an item song. Later Saurabh Sachdeva, Tarak Ponnappa, Satya and Adithya Menon were also reported to be in the second part of the film.

=== Filming ===
In July 2019, the makers planned to start filming during the occasion of Dusshera (7 October 2019). However, the launch event of the film took place on 30 October 2019, with a formal puja ceremony (muhurat shot) held in Hyderabad at the office of Mythri Movie Makers, with the film's cast and crew being present at the event. In December 2019, Sukumar performed a test shoot in Kerala's Athirappilly Falls. After Allu Arjun's involvement in the promotions of Ala Vaikunthapurramuloo (2020), the makers planned to shoot the first schedule of the film in Kerala in March 2020, with Arjun joining the schedule, however, the filming was halted due to COVID-19 pandemic in India.

For a six-minute action sequence in the film, the team planned to hire action choreographers from South India, instead of opting for foreign technicians. Thus, the film became a "Make in India" project, and an initiative to provide employment to the workers from the Indian film industry, after some technicians faced employment crisis due to the pandemic. This sequence was reported to be made a cost of ₹6 crore (US$620,000) and Allu Arjun trained intensively for it.

In June 2020, the makers planned to resume the shoot at Ramoji Film City in Hyderabad, and later planned to shoot the film at Nalgonda. After the government permitted film shootings with a minimal crew, the makers resumed filming on 10 November 2020 in the Maredumilli forest in Andhra Pradesh, and completed it within 14 days. The team then moved to Rajahmundry in December 2020 to shoot key sequences, but that was postponed to January 2021, as twelve crew members working on the film were diagnosed with COVID-19. The shooting later resumed in January 2021 and the production house tweeted that two schedules at Rampachodavaram and Maredumilli were completed within February 2021. The team also finished a schedule at Kerala in March 2021.

The shooting of the film was put on hold due to restrictions following the second wave of COVID-19 pandemic in India, and Allu Arjun was also diagnosed with COVID-19 in late April. The team resumed the final leg of shooting on 6 July 2021, with a major schedule filmed in Secunderabad, but came to a halt on 24 July 2021 when Sukumar was diagnosed with dengue fever. The filming resumed after Sukumar recovered from the disease. On 22 August 2021, Fahadh Faasil joined the shooting schedule of the film. After wrapping her portions in the Hindi film Goodbye, Rashmika joined the shoot for filming her portions. In September 2021, she rejoined the shoot after a brief break. On 8 September, Allu Arjun headed to Maredumilli to film the final schedule. After a month-long production, on 4 October, the team started shooting face off scenes between Allu Arjun and Fahadh Faasil. The song "Srivalli" was mainly shot in Thirumalai Kovil, Tenkasi district of Tamil Nadu. Finally, a special song special song featuring Samantha was filmed in November 2021 at a specially constructed set at the Ramoji Film City and "Ey Bidda Idi Na Adda" (transl. This is my area) song was filmed at the Mallikarjun Swami Temple of Beeramguda. After this, the film entered into the post-production phase.

Speaking to the media at a promotional event of Tamil version in Chennai, Allu Arjun said that "We had about 400–500 cars in the forest that would take us from point A to B. In some places, there were no roads and we had to create a pathway with whatever was available. The filming itself took us almost two years, that is why I say this: the effort we had put in for Pushpa is equal to four films."

The shooting of the second part began with a test shoot on 30 October 2022 in Hyderabad. In January 2023, an action sequence was shot in Visakhapatnam. In March 2023, some scenes were shot in Bangalore. Rumours were circulated that the shooting of the film was stopped as director was unsatisfied but later turned out to be false as shooting was again started after a few days.

In April 2023, some forest sequences were shot in Malkangiri district of Odisha. Jagapathi Babu was cast in April 2023. Fahadh Faasil joined the sets in May 2023 while Rashmika joined the sets in June 2023. On 3 June 2023, a bus carrying crew artist from the film met with an accident near the Vijayawada–Hyderabad Expressway. In July 2023, an action sequence was shot in Visakhapatnam Port along with 50 stuntmans, where Allu Arjun hanged upside down almost 100 feet above the ground using a crane. In August 2023, some scenes were shot in Ramoji Film City. In November 2023, the filming resumed in Hyderabad. In December 2023, the filming was postponed due to Allu Arjun's health.

In March 2024, some sequences were shot in Vizag and Yaganti Temple. It was later reported that the makers spend ₹50–60 crore for the Gangamma Jatara performance and a fight sequence. In April 2024, a massive underwater sequence was shot in Hyderabad. In May 2024, it was reported that the film will have multiple endings and to maintain secrecy the makers opted the no phone policy on the film set. In July 2024, it was reported that shooting of film was delayed due to rift and creative differences between Allu Arjun and Sukumar, however they were later proven to be false rumours as shooting was restarted again in Hyderabad.

Sets depicting 1990s and 2000s Japan and Malaysia were recreated at Ramoji Film City, though plans were to shoot on location, recces at Bangkok, Malaysia, and Japan determined that budget and time constraints would not allow it. In August 2024, the climax of the film was shot. An item number featuring Sreeleela was filmed in November 2024 in Hyderabad. The whole shooting of the film including a romantic song was wrapped by late November 2024.

== Cast and crew ==
=== Cast ===
List indicators

This section includes characters who will appear or have appeared in the Pushpa film series.

- An empty grey cell indicates the character was not in the film, or that the character's official presence has not yet been confirmed.
- ^{G} indicates a guest appearance in the season.
- ^{Y} indicates a younger version of the character.

Character	Films	
Character	Pushpa: The Rise (2021)	Pushpa 2: The Rule (2024)
Pushpa Raj	Allu Arjun Master Dhruvan^{Y}	Allu Arjun Master Dhruvan^{Y}
Srivalli	Rashmika Mandanna	Rashmika Mandanna
SP Bhanwar Singh Shekhawat IPS	Fahadh Faasil	Fahadh Faasil
Kesava "Mondelu"	Jagadeesh Prathap Bandari	Jagadeesh Prathap Bandari
Mangalam Srinu	Sunil	Sunil
Dakshayani "Daksha"	Anasuya Bharadwaj	Anasuya Bharadwaj
MP Bhumireddy Siddappa Naidu	Rao Ramesh	Rao Ramesh
Parvatamma	Kalpa Latha	Kalpa Latha
Molleti Mohan Raj	Ajay	Ajay
Molleti Dharma Raj	Sritej	Sritej
Molleti Kaveri	Pavani Karanam	Pavani Karanam
Konda Reddy	Ajay Ghosh	
Jaali Reddy	Dhananjaya	Dhananjaya
Jakka Reddy	Shanmukh	Shanmukh
Chennai Murugan	Mime Gopi	Mime Gopi
Muniratnam	Dayanand Reddy	Dayanand Reddy
SI Kupparaj	Brahmaji	Brahmaji
Mogileesu	Raj Tirandasu	
DSP Govindappa	Shatru	
Central Minister Kogatam Veera Pratap Reddy		Jagapathi Babu
CM KVM Narasimha Reddy		Aadukalam Naren
Hameed		Saurabh Sachdeva
Hiroshi		Vithaya Pansringarm
Item number	Samantha Ruth Prabhu^{G} ("Oo Antava Oo Oo Antava")	Sreeleela^{G} ("Kissik")

=== Crew ===
Occupation	Film	
Occupation	Pushpa: The Rise (2021)	Pushpa 2: The Rule (2024)
Director	Sukumar	Sukumar
Producer	Naveen Yerneni; Yalamanchili Ravi Shankar	Naveen Yerneni; Yalamanchili Ravi Shankar
Writer	Sukumar	Sukumar
Dialogues	Srikanth Vissa	Srikanth Vissa
Cinematography	Miroslaw Kuba Brożek	Miroslaw Kuba Brożek
Editor	Karthika Srinivas; Ruben	Naveen Nooli
Music	Devi Sri Prasad	Devi Sri Prasad

== Box office ==
Film	Release date	Budget	Box office revenue
Pushpa: The Rise	17 December 2021	₹200 crore (US$27.06 million)– ₹250 crore (US$33.82 million) (Note: The Tribune, News 18, Outlook, GQ India, Mashable India, NDTV and The Times of India stated the budget as ₹200 crore. But The Indian Express and Zoom reported the budget as ₹250 crore.)	₹360 crore (US$48.7 million)–₹393.5 crore (US$53.23 million)
Pushpa 2: The Rule	5 December 2024	₹400 crore (US$47.81 million)–₹500 crore (US$59.76 million)	₹1,642 crore (US$196.25 million)–₹1,800 crore (US$215.13 million)
Total		₹600 crore (US$62 million)–₹750 crore (US$78 million)	₹2,002 crore (US$210 million)–₹2,193.5 crore (US$230 million)

== Accolades ==
=== Pushpa: The Rise ===
At the 69th National Film Awards, Pushpa: The Rise won two awards – Best Actor (Arjun) and Best Music Direction (Prasad). At the 67th Filmfare Awards South, it won seven awards meant for Telugu films, including Best Film, Best Director (Sukumar) and Best Actor (Arjun).

== See also ==
- List of Indian film series
- List of highest-grossing franchises
