= Sri Valli =

Sri Valli or Srivalli may refer to:

- Acacia concinna, a kind of shrub from India used in traditional medicine, known as Srivalli in Sanskrit
- Sri Valli (1945 film), an Indian Tamil-language film
- Sri Valli (1961 film), an Indian Tamil-language film
- Srivalli (2017 film), an Indian Telugu-language film
- Srivalli, a character from the 2021 Indian film Pushpa
  - "Srivalli", a song from the film's soundtrack
