= Pushpa: The Rise (soundtrack) =

2021 soundtrack album by Devi Sri Prasad

- Soundtrack album cover

Soundtrack album by Devi Sri Prasad
- Released: 16 December 2021
- Recorded: 2020–2021
- Genre: Feature film soundtrack
- Length: 19:58
- Language: Telugu
- Labels: Aditya Music (Telugu, Tamil, Malayalam & Kannada); T-Series (Hindi)
- Producer: Devi Sri Prasad

Devi Sri Prasad chronology
Radhe (2021)	Pushpa: The Rise (2021)	Rowdy Boys (2022)

Singles from Pushpa: The Rise
- 1. "Daako Daako Meka" Released: 13 August 2021; 2. "Srivalli" Released: 13 October 2021; 3. "Oo Antava Oo Oo Antava" Released: 10 December 2021; 4. "Saami Saami" Released: 28 October 2021; 5. "Eyy Bidda Idhi Naa Adda" Released: 19 November 2021

Pushpa: The Rise is the soundtrack album composed by Devi Sri Prasad to the 2021 Indian Telugu-language action drama film of the same name, directed by Sukumar, starring Allu Arjun, Fahadh Faasil and Rashmika Mandanna. The soundtrack features five tracks written by Chandrabose.

== Production ==
The music production of the film began in mid 2020 and in a Zoom video interaction, Prasad revealed that five songs were finalized for the film and had started composing the tunes during the nationwide lockdown due to COVID-19. By the end of May 2021, Devi has recorded composition of an item number which has folk music influences. Ganesh Acharya has choreographed the dance moves in the first song "Daako Daako Meka" and "Oo Antava Oo Oo Antava". On 26 February 2021, Jani Master announced that he has choreographed a song from the film. Earlier Nora Fatehi was confirmed to feature alongside Allu Arjun in an item number in September 2021. The song, which was later released as "Oo Antava Oo Oo Antava", was reported to be choreographed by Ganesh Acharya. The song "Srivalli" was mainly shot in Thirumalai Kovil, Tenkasi district of Tamil Nadu and "Ey Bidda Idi Na Adda" song was filmed at the Mallikarjuna Swamy Temple of Beeramguda. Finally in November 2021, Samantha Ruth Prabhu was announced to be part of the item number alongside Allu Arjun, and was choreographed by Ganesh Acharya. The song was shot at Ramoji Film City at the end of November 2021.

== Release ==
On 2 August 2021, coinciding with Prasad's birthday, the team announced that the first single from the film will be released on 13 August 2021 in all the five languages. The second single "Srivalli" was released on 13 October 2021. It was a huge success and debuted atop the Billboard India charts. The third single "Saami Saami" (labeled as the fourth single in the album) was released on 28 October 2021 in all languages excluding Hindi, due to few issues regarding distribution rights of the Hindi version. The fourth single (labeled as the fifth single in the album) of the soundtrack album "Eyy Bidda Idhi Naa Adda" (in Telugu), "Eyy Beta Idhu En Patta" (in Tamil), "Eyy Poda Ithu Njaanaada" (in Malayalam), "Eyy Maga Idhu Nan Jaaga" (in Kannada) and "Eyy Bidda Ye Mera Adda" (in Hindi (Note: Released as third single in Hindi version)) was released on 19 November 2021. The last single (labeled as the third single in the album), an item number, "Oo Antava Oo Oo Antava" (in Telugu), "Oo Solriya Oo Oo Solriya" (in Tamil), "Oo Chollunno Oo Oo Chollunno" (in Malayalam), "Oo Anthiya Oo Oo Anthiya" (in Kannada) and "Oo Bolega Ya Oo Oo Bolega" (in Hindi (Note: Released as fourth single in Hindi version)) was released on 10 December 2021.

== Track listing ==
All tracks are written by Chandrabose.

Telugu version
No.	Title	Singer(s)	Length
1.	"Daakko Daakko Meka"	Shivam	4:55
2.	"Srivalli"	Sid Sriram	3:41
3.	"Oo Antava Oo Oo Antava"	Indravathi Chauhan	3:43
4.	"Saami Saami"	Mounika Yadav	3:43
5.	"Eyy Bidda Idhi Naa Adda"	Nakash Aziz	3:54
Total length:			19:58

All tracks are written by Viveka.

Tamil version
No.	Title	Singer(s)	Length
1.	"Odu Odu Aadu"	Benny Dayal	4:55
2.	"Srivalli"	Sid Sriram	3:41
3.	"Oo Solriya Oo Oo Solriya"	Andrea Jeremiah	3:43
4.	"Saami Saami"	Rajalakshmi Senthil Ganesh	3:43
5.	"Eyy Beta Idhu En Patta"	Nakash Aziz	3:54
Total length:			19:58

All tracks are written by Siju Thuravoor.

Malayalam version
No.	Title	Singer(s)	Length
1.	"Odu Odu Aade"	Rahul Nambiar	4:55
2.	"Srivalli"	Sid Sriram	3:41
3.	"Oo Chollunno Oo Oo Chollunno"	Remya Nambeesan	3:43
4.	"Saami Saami"	Sithara Krishnakumar	3:43
5.	"Eyy Poda Ithu Njaanaada"	Ranjith Govind	3:54
Total length:			19:58

All tracks are written by Varadaraj Chikkaballapura.

Kannada version
No.	Title	Singer(s)	Length
1.	"Jokke Jokke Meke"	Vijay Prakash	4:55
2.	"Srivalli"	Sid Sriram	3:41
3.	"Oo Anthiya Oo Oo Anthiya"	Mangli	3:43
4.	"Saami Saami"	Ananya Bhat	3:43
5.	"Eyy Maga Idhu Nan Jaaga"	Vijay Prakash	3:54
Total length:			19:58

All tracks are written by Raqueeb Alam.

Hindi version
No.	Title	Singer(s)	Length
1.	"Jaago Jaago Bakre"	Vishal Dadlani	4:57
2.	"Srivalli"	Javed Ali	3:44
3.	"Oo Bolega Ya Oo Oo Bolega"	Kanika Kapoor	3:46
4.	"Saami Saami"	Sunidhi Chauhan	3:47
5.	"Eyy Bidda Ye Mera Adda"	Nakash Aziz	3:56
Total length:			20:10

== Background score ==
Pushpa: The Rise

Film score by Devi Sri Prasad
- Released: 27 May 2023
- Recorded: 2020–2021
- Genre: Film score
- Length: 26:13
- Language: Telugu
- Label: Aditya Music
- Producer: Devi Sri Prasad

The background score was arranged and composed by Devi Sri Prasad.

Pushpa The Rise (OST)
No.	Title	Length
1.	"Pushpa Entry"	1:47
2.	"Mother Flashback"	1:17
3.	"Police Attack"	1:13
4.	"Pushpa and Mangalam Srinu First Meet"	1:17
5.	"Saving Sandal Woods"	1:43
6.	"Pushpa and Srivalli Engagement"	1:51
7.	"Pushpa On Fire"	1:19
8.	"Pushpa Mother Theme"	1:14
9.	"Forest Fight"	1:17
10.	"Interval Bang"	1:26
11.	"Mass Theme of Pushpa"	1:55
12.	"Saving Srivalli's Father"	1:04
13.	"Srivalli Sad Version"	1:26
14.	"Jolly Reddy Fight"	1:30
15.	"Bhanwar Singh Entry"	1:19
16.	"Pushpa The Brand"	1:17
17.	"Pushpa Pre Climax"	1:17
18.	"Pushpa To Be Continued"	1:52
Total length:		26:13
