= Puspa =

Puspa (meaning beautiful) is an Indonesian / Sanskrit Indian name that may refer to the following notable people:

- Puspa Arumsari (born 1993), Indonesian pencak silat practitioner
- Swietenia Puspa Lestari (born 1994), Indonesian diver, environmental engineer and environmental activist
- Shendy Puspa Irawati (born 1987), Indonesian badminton player
- Titiek Puspa (1937-2025), Indonesian singer and songwriter

== See also ==
- Pushpa (disambiguation)
- Puspa Indah, a 1980 album by Indonesian singer Chrisye
