= Vimanam =

Vimanam may refer to:

- Shikhara, the rising roof of a Hindu temple in North India
- Vimanam (tower), which crowns the innermost sanctum of a South Indian temple (Dravidian style of architecture)
- Vimanam (game), a traditional boardgame in India
- Vimaanam, 2017 Indian Malayalam-language film
- Vimanam (2023 film), a 2023 Indian Telugu-language film

== See also ==
- Vimana (disambiguation)
