= Saami Saami =

2021 song by Devi Sri Prasad, Chandrabose and Mounika Yadav

- Official song cover

Single by Devi Sri Prasad and Chandrabose featuring Mounika Yadav

from the album Pushpa: The Rise
- Language: Telugu
- Released: 28 October 2021
- Recorded: 2020–2021
- Genre: Dance; pop; EDM; Item number
- Length: 3:13
- Label: Aditya Music
- Composer: Devi Sri Prasad
- Lyricist: Chandrabose
- Producer: Devi Sri Prasad

Pushpa: The Rise track listing
- 1. "Daako Daako Meka"; 2. "Srivalli"; 3. "Oo Antava Oo Oo Antava"; 4. "Saami Saami"; 5. "Eyy Bidda Idhi Naa Adda"

Music video
- "Saami Saami" on YouTube

"Saami Saami" is an Indian Telugu-language song, composed by Devi Sri Prasad, with lyrics written by Chandrabose and recorded by Mounika Yadav for the soundtrack album of the 2021 Indian film Pushpa: The Rise. It was released on 28 October 2021 (released on YouTube as a lyrical video song) as the third single from the album, through Aditya Music. The Hindi version was released through T-Series later due to few issues regarding distribution rights of the film. The full video song, featuring visuals directly from the film, was released on 7 January 2022 on YouTube.

The song was also released with the same title in Hindi, Tamil, Kannada and Malayalam language dubbed versions. The song was produced by Aditya Music in Bengali with the same title and was released in July 2023. The hook leg-dance step in the film, performed by the lead actor Rashmika Mandanna became widely popular and a pop-cultural phenomenon. Although the song and the film were released in 2021, it had a consecutive commercial success throughout 2022.

== Background and composition ==
Mounika Yadav has made her recording debut with the song in Telugu. Impressed by her performance in the independent folk song "Bava O Sari Rava", composer Devi Sri Prasad has signed her. She has recorded the song in November 2020. Rajalakshmi Senthil Ganesh, Sithara, Ananya Bhat, Sunidhi Chauhan and Shithi Saha have recorded the song in Tamil, Malayalam, Kannada, Hindi and Bengali languages respectively.

== Music video ==
=== Background and production ===
The scenes involved in the music video of the song were shot at Maredumilli, Andhra Pradesh. Sekhar has choreographed the dance sequences.

=== Synopsis ===
The music video is a direct clip from the scenes in Pushpa: The Rise. The scenes feature Allu Arjun and Rashmika Mandanna dancing together during a party.

== Commercial performance ==
The music video of the song became one of the YouTube India's 2022 top music videos, as declared by the YouTube's official charts. The Hindi version was ranked third. In February 2022, the Hindi, Telugu and Malayalam versions debuted at number three, six and twenty in the inaugural Billboard India Songs chart. It has become one of the top-10 most searched regional songs in 2023 on Amazon Alexa in India, alongside "Saami Saami", "Oo Antava Oo Oo Antava", "Naatu Naatu", "Butta Bomma" and others.

== Live performance ==
Mounika Yadav performed the song at the pre-release event of the film held in December 2021 in Hyderabad.

== Credits and personnel ==
Credits adapted from YouTube.

- Devi Sri Prasad – composer, banjo and melodica
- Chandrabose – lyrics
- Mounika Yadav – vocals
- Vikas Badisa – keyboards
- Kalyan – rhythm
- Rajkumar – accordion
- Laxminarayana – live rhythms
- Raju – live rhythms
- A. Uday Kumar – mix engineer, mastering engineer, record engineer
- S P Abhishek – vocal mix assistant
- T. Uday Kumar – record engineer
- Suresh Kumar Taddi – record engineer
- Murugan – orchestra in-charge
- Pugalendhi – studio assistant
- R Raja – studio assistant
- V Dhinakaran – studio assistant
- B. Manikandan – album co-ordinator

== Charts ==
Weekly chart performance for "Saami Saami"
Chart (2023)	Peak position
India (Billboard) "Saami Saami" – Hindi	3
India (Billboard) "Saami Saami" – Telugu	6
India (Billboard) "Saami Saami" – Malayalam	20

== Accolades ==
Award (Note: Awards, festivals and organizations are in alphabetical order.)	Date of ceremony (Note: Date is linked to the article about the awards held that year, wherever possible.)	Category	Recipient(s)	Result	Ref.
GAMA Awards	3 March 2024	Best Popular Song 2021	Mounika Yadav	Won	
Mirchi Music Awards	8 March 2022	Female Vocalist of The Year	Sunidhi Chauhan	Nominated	
South Indian International Movie Awards	10 September 2022	Best Female Playback Singer – Telugu	Mounika Yadav	Nominated	

== Impact and legacy ==
The song received positive reception from audiences, praising the music, vocal and choreography. The dance moves popularly known as Saami Saami hook-step, performed by Rashmika Mandanna became a pop cultural phenomenon. There were many short videos created on social media, performing to the music and recreating dance sequences. Many celebrities have also recreated the hook-step at various events. Rashmika Mandanna performed to the song at the opening ceremony of 2023 Indian Premier League. She has also performed to the song at the Zee Cine Awards 2023.

The Tamil version of the song is featured in the last episode of the final season of American television series Never Have I Ever. Devi (Maitreyi Ramakrishnan) and Kamala (Richa Moorjani) danced to the song at the wedding ceremony, in the episode.
