= Pushpaka Vimana (disambiguation) =

Pushpaka Vimana is a mythological flying palace or chariot in the Indian epic Ramayana.

Pushpaka Vimana may also refer to:

- Pushpaka Vimana (1987 film), an Indian silent drama film by Singeetam Srinivasa Rao
- Pushpaka Vimana (2017 film), an Indian Kannada-language film
- Pushpak Vimaan, a 2018 Indian Marathi-language film
- Pushpaka Vimanam, a 2021 Indian Telugu-language film
- Pushpaka Vimanam, a 2024 Indian Malyalam-language film

== See also ==
- Pushpaka (disambiguation)
- Vimana (disambiguation)
