= 295 (song) =

Single by Sidhu Moose Wala

from the album Moosetape
- Language: Punjabi
- Released: July 14, 2021
- Recorded: 2021
- Genre: Progressive hip hop; Conscious hip hop
- Label: Sidhu Moose Wala
- Songwriter: Sidhu Moose Wala
- Producer: The Kidd

Sidhu Moose Wala singles chronology
"Calaboose" (2020)	"295" (2021)	"IDGAF" (2022)

Music video
- "295" on YouTube

"295" is a song recorded by Punjabi singer-rapper Sidhu Moose Wala, released on 14 July 2021. The song was written by Sidhu Moose Wala and produced by The Kidd and was featured on his third studio album Moosetape (2021). This song's title matched with the date of his assassination, which was May 29th, or "29/5", if written according to the British date and time notation. A music video for the track was premiered during a show in Toronto in 2026, 4 years after Moosewala's passing, as part of the posthumous "Signed to God" world tour, which employed the use of hologram to recreate his presence.

== Cultural impact ==
The title of "295" refers to Section 295 of the Indian Penal Code. The song addresses religious controversy and freedom of expression. The BBC described it as a commentary on the shrinking scope for dissent in India, while The Indian Express interpreted its lyrics as criticism of corrupt politicians and the use of religion in politics.

In June 2022, "295", from Moose Wala's 2021 album Moosetape, entered the Billboard Global 200 at number 154. It was the first entry on the chart by a Punjabi artist. By 17 June 2022, its music video had received more than 198 million views on YouTube.

On 29 May 2024, "295" was played at a rally addressed by Congress leader Rahul Gandhi in Dakha, Ludhiana, where Gandhi paid tribute to Moose Wala on the second anniversary of his death. The crowd cheered as the song played. On 2 June, Gandhi referred to the song while discussing the 2024 Indian general election results, asking, "Have you heard Sidhu Moosewala's song, '295'?"

In January 2023, Moga Police constable Gurbhej Singh adapted the tune of "295" for a road-safety awareness song. The lyrics urged motorists to wear helmets and seat belts, follow speed limits and give way to emergency vehicles.

In July 2026, hundreds of students and other protesters sang "295" at Jantar Mantar in New Delhi. during protests organised by the Cockroach Janta Party (CJP) over the NEET paper leak.

== Charts ==
Weekly chart performance for "295"
Chart (2022)	Peak position
Canada (Canadian Hot 100)	62
Global 200 (Billboard)	154
India (Billboard)	1
New Zealand Hot Singles (RMNZ)	37
