= Vimana (disambiguation) =

Vimana may mean:

- Vimana, "flying chariot" in Indian epics
  - In most modern Indian languages, the word vimāna, vimān means aircraft
- Vimanavatthu (Pali for "Vimāna Stories"), a Buddhist book, uses the word "vimāna" to mean "a small piece of text used as the inspiration for a Buddhist sermon"
- The adytum of Rama temples
- Vimanapura, a suburb of Bangalore, India
- Vimana (architectural feature), the distinctive pyramidical roof-towers of south Indian temples and is the sanctum of a Hindu temple where the deity is enshrined
- Shikhara or Vimana, the rising roof of a Hindu temple in north India
- ICP Vimana, an ultralight aircraft
- Vimana (video game), a 1991 video game
- Vimana (album), a 1976 album by the Italian progressive rock and jazz fusion group Nova
- Vimana, a Dutch trance music project by Ferry Corsten and Tiesto

== See also ==
- Vimanam (disambiguation)
- Pushpaka Vimana (disambiguation)
- Biman, the national airline of Bangladesh
