= Tom and Jerry (2021 Indian film) =

- Theatrical release poster
- Directed by: Raaghav Vinay Shivagange
- Written by: Raaghav Vinay Shivagange
- Produced by: Raju Sheregar
- Starring: Nischith Korodi; Chaitra Rao
- Cinematography: Sanketh MYS
- Edited by: Suraj Ankolekar
- Music by: Mathews Manu
- Production company: Riddhi Siddhi Films
- Release date: 12 November 2021
- Country: India
- Language: Kannada

Tom And Jerry (stylised as Tom & Jerry) is a 2021 Indian Kannada-language romantic comedy film directed by Raaghav Vinay Shivagange and starring Nischith Korodi of Gantumoote (2019) fame and Chaitra Rao.

== Cast ==
- Nischith Korodi as Dharma
- Chaitra Rao as Satya
- Shekhar
- Tara
- Jai Jagadish
- S. Shivaramanna
- Rockline Sudhakar
- Kaddipudi Chandru
- Padmaja Rao
- Kote Prabhakar
- Sampath Maitreya

== Production ==
Raaghav Vinay Shivagange, the dialogue writer of KGF: Chapter 1 (2018), made his directorial debut with this film. The lead cast of the film are engaged in a cat and mouse game similar to the titular characters of Tom and Jerry.

== Soundtrack ==
The music was composed by Mathews Manu and features five songs and three bit songs. Sid Sriram made his Kannada debut through this film.

== Release and reception ==
The film was released on 12 November 2021.

A critic from The Times of India rated the film three out of five stars and wrote that "Tom & Jerry is a tale that has ample promise and some good moments, but it falters". A critic from The New Indian Express wrote that "overall Tom and Jerry makes it a one-time watch, and can definitely be enjoyed in the company of friends and family".
