= Pushpaka (disambiguation) =

Pushpaka may refer to:

- Flower in Sanskrit language
- Pushpaka Vimana, a flying chariot mentioned in the Hindu epic Ramayana
- Pushpaka Brahmin, a semi-Brahmin Hindu community of Kerala, India
  - Pushpaka, one of the various castes of Pushpaka Brahmins of Kerala

== See also ==
- Pushpaka Vimana (disambiguation)
