= Oo Antava Oo Oo Antava =

2021 single by Devi Sri Prasad, Chandrabose and Indravathi Chauhan

- Official single cover

Single by Devi Sri Prasad and Chandrabose featuring Indravathi Chauhan

from the album Pushpa: The Rise
- Language: Telugu
- Released: 10 December 2021
- Recorded: 2020–2021
- Genre: Dance; pop; EDM; Item number
- Length: 3:43
- Label: Aditya Music
- Composer: Devi Sri Prasad
- Lyricist: Chandrabose
- Producer: Devi Sri Prasad

Music video
- "Oo Antava Oo Oo Antava" on YouTube

"Oo Antava Oo Oo Antava" (transl. Will you say yes or will you say no?) is a 2021 Indian Telugu-language single composed by Devi Sri Prasad, with lyrics written by Chandrabose, and recorded by Indravathi Chauhan. It was released on 10 December 2021 by Aditya Music as the fifth single from the soundtrack album of the film Pushpa: The Rise. A lyrical video of the single was initially released on YouTube, followed by the full video song featuring film visuals on 7 January 2022.

The single was also released in multiple languages: in Tamil as "Oo Solriya Oo Oo Solriya", in Malayalam as "Oo Chollunno Oo Oo Chollunno", in Kannada as "Oo Anthiya Oo Oo Anthiya", and in Hindi as "Oo Bolega Ya Oo Oo Bolega". Despite being part of the film's soundtrack, the single achieved widespread commercial success independently, continuing into 2022. Its hook step dance performed by Samantha alongside Allu Arjun became a viral trend, contributing significantly to the film's popularity.

The single marked a turning point in Samantha's career, with several media outlets such as Deccan Chronicle and Outlook highlighting its influence on her stardom.

== Background and composition ==
Devi Sri Prasad composed the song. The song was recorded during phase one and two of the COVID-19 lockdown in India. During the music production of the film, Prasad decided to feature a new singer to record the song. It was then Indravathi Chauhan was selected to record the song.

Mangli, sister of Chauhan said, "When Devi Sri Prasad, the music director of the film, was looking for a fresh new voice to sing ‘Oo Antava’, he put the word out. Devi Sri Prasad was sent around ten videos of different folk singers performing, among which was one of Indravathi singing on my show. Devi Sri Prasad zeroed in on her and I got a call from his manager, asking if my sister would like to give a voice test. Soon, she was selected and her voice was perfect for the song".

The opening phrase, "Koka Koka Koka Kadithe Kora Koramantu Choostharu" translates to "They kill me with their looks if I wear a saree".

The song was released in Tamil as "Oo Solriya Oo Oo Solriya" with lyrics written by Viveka and sung by Andrea Jeremiah. The song was released in Malayalam as "Oo Chollunno Oo Oo Chollunno" with lyrics written by Siju Thuravoor and sung by Remya Nambeesan. The song was released in Kannada as "Oo Anthiya Oo Oo Anthiya" with lyrics written by Varadaraj Chikkaballapura and sung by Indravathi's sister Mangli. The song was released in Hindi as "Oo Bolega Ya Oo Oo Bolega" with lyrics written by Raqueeb Alam and sung by Kanika Kapoor.

== Music video ==
=== Background and production ===
As part of the film's production, the scenes involved in the music video of the song were shot at a specially constructed set at the Ramoji Film City in late-November 2021. Earlier, Nora Fatehi was confirmed to feature alongside Allu Arjun in an item number in September 2021. Later, it was confirmed that Samantha will feature in a special appearance in the song. Ganesh Acharya has choreographed the dance sequences. On 15 November 2021, the makers of the film Pushpa: The Rise announced a special song featuring Samantha Ruth Prabhu through their social media handles. On 30 November 2021, they released a poster that featured a back shot of Samantha and announced the commencement of shooting.

=== Synopsis ===
The music video is a direct clip from the scenes in Pushpa: The Rise. The scenes feature Samantha and Allu Arjun dancing together during a party.

== Commercial performance ==
Upon the release, song received widespread acclaim from the audience. In February 2022, it debuted at number two in the inaugural Billboard India Songs chart. The music video of the song became one of the YouTube India's 2022 top music videos, as declared by the YouTube's official charts. The song was ranked seventh, whereas it's Hindi version "Oo Bolega Ya Oo Oo Bolega" ranked sixth. It has become one of the top-10 most searched regional songs in 2023 on Amazon Alexa in India, alongside "Saami Saami", "Srivalli", "Naatu Naatu", "Butta Bomma" and others.

== Live performance ==
Indravathi Chauhan and Mangli performed the song at the pre-release event of the film held in December 2021 in Hyderabad. Chauhan performed the song in the ETV variety show Sridevi Drama Company in January 2022. Dutch DJ and record producer Martin Garrix has performed the song during his tour in Hyderabad in March 2023. Allu Arjun was also joined to perform the song. Devi Sri Prasad has performed the song several times during his Oo Antava (2023–2024) concert tour across various venues in the United States, the United Kingdom, Malaysia and others.

== Credits and personnel ==
Credits adapted from YouTube.

- Devi Sri Prasad – Composer
- Chandrabose – Lyricist
- Indravati Chauhan – Vocal
- Ganesh Acharya – Choreographer
- A. Uday Kumar – Mix engineer, mastering engineer, programmer

== Charts ==
Weekly chart performance for "Oo Antava Oo Oo Antava"
Chart (2021–2022)	Peak position
India (Billboard) Oo Antava Oo Oo Antava	2
India (Billboard) Oo Solriya Oo Oo Solriya	16
UK Asian Music Chart (OCC)	11

== Accolades ==
Award (Note: Awards, festivals and organizations are in alphabetical order.)	Date of ceremony	Category	Recipient(s)	Result	Ref.
Filmfare Awards South	9 October 2022	Best Playback Singer – Female	Indravathi Chauhan	Won	
Sakshi Excellence Awards	21 October 2022	Most Popular Singer – Female	Indravathi Chauhan	Won	
South Indian International Movie Awards	10 September 2022	Best Female Playback Singer – Telugu	Indravathi Chauhan	Nominated	
Santosham Film Awards	26 December 2022	Best Female Playback Singer	Indravathi Chauhan	Won	

== Impact ==
The song received positive reception from audiences, praising the music, vocal and choreography. The hook step, performed by Samantha, went viral on social media. Indian cricketer Virat Kohli danced to the song. Alia Bhatt praised the song. Sanya Malhotra danced to the song. Likewise, there were many short videos performing to the music and recreating dance sequences. Dutch singer Emma Heesters performed a cover of the song which was released on 19 February 2022. Tamannaah Bhatia performed to the song at the opening ceremony of 2023 Indian Premier League. Composer Devi Sri Prasad announced the Oo Antava concert tour banking on the success of the song.

During the 24th IIFA Awards, held in Abu Dhabi in September 2024, hosts Shah Rukh Khan and Vicky Kaushal danced to the song. In the same event, Janhvi Kapoor had a dance performance, including the "Oo Antava Oo Oo Antava" song.

== Controversy ==
In December 2021, a lawsuit was filed at a court in Andhra Pradesh against the song by a certain men's association. According to them, the song portrayed men as casanovas and eve teasers as its lyrics seemingly mock the male gaze. They also asked for a ban on the song. Allu Arjun replied to the controversy that, "It's true. Whatever is written in the song is true."

In 2025, Devi Sri Prasad alleged that Turkish singer Atiye's song "Anlayana" is a copy of Oo Antava. Fans pointed out identical melodies, tempo, and rhythmic patterns between the two songs. While disappointed by the lack of credit, Prasad expressed pride in Telugu music's global reach and is contemplating legal steps against Atiye.
