= Sid Sriram =

Indian-American musician

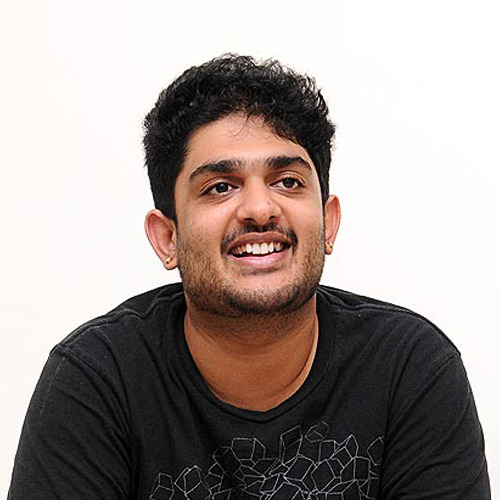
- Sid Sriram in 2016

Background information
- Born: Sidharth Sriram; 19 May 1990 (age 36); Chennai, Tamil Nadu, India
- Genres: R&B, Carnatic
- Occupations: Carnatic musician; Music producer; Playback singer
- Years active: 2013–present
- Label: Warner Music India

Sidharth Sriram (born 19 May 1990) known as Sid Sriram is an Indian Carnatic musician, music producer, playback singer. He is an R&B songwriter and has been working in the Tamil, Telugu, Kannada, Malayalam, Hindi, Marathi and English music industry. He regularly collaborates with his sister Pallavi Sriram, a Bharatanatyam dancer, and music director.

== Early life ==
Sid Sriram was born in Chennai, Tamil Nadu to a Tamil Hindu family. He moved with his parents to United States at the age of one, growing up in Fremont, California. His musical skills were nurtured by his mother, Latha Sriram, a Carnatic music teacher in the San Francisco Bay Area. He started learning Carnatic music since he was 3 years old.

He simultaneously started picking up R&B. After graduating from Mission San Jose High School in 2008, he joined the Berklee College of Music and graduated in music production and engineering. After his graduation, he regularly visited India and performed in Carnatic concerts, including as a part of the December Music season - Marghazhi Utsavam and has since moved back to India and currently resides in the Mylapore area in Chennai.

== Career ==
He made his debut as a music composer where he would compose for ace director Mani Ratnam's production, Vaanam Kottatum, which is directed by Mani's former assistant and director of Padaiveeran, Dhana Sekharan. His "Srivalli" song from Pushpa: The Rise was well received.

Outside of films, Sriram released his own debut LP Entropy in 2019, based on the independent song of the same name that he published in 2012. He began production on Sidharth, an all-English album, in 2021 with producer Ryan Olson on the label Def Jam. The album mixes Carnatic music with R&B and indie rock influences that Sriram has previously explored. The album was released on August 25, 2023, following the release of singles Dear Sahana, The Hard Way, and Friendly Fire. He has also collaborated with independent musicians on various singles as a featured artist.

== Discography ==
=== Independent albums ===
==== English ====
Year	Album	Song	Composer	Ref
2019	Entropy	Eyes Open	Sid Sriram	
2019	Entropy	It Isn't True	Sid Sriram	
2019	Entropy	6 Weeks	Sid Sriram	
2019	Entropy	Entropy	Sid Sriram	
2019	Entropy	Paper Plates	Sid Sriram	
2019	Entropy	Palm Trees, Fleeting	Sid Sriram	
2019	Entropy	Moksha	Sid Sriram	
2019	Entropy	Back Down	Sid Sriram	
2019	Entropy	2AM Prayer	Sid Sriram	
2019	Entropy	Waiting For The Sun	Sid Sriram	
2019	Entropy	Daunting	Sid Sriram	
2019	Entropy	Limitless	Sid Sriram	
2023	Sidharth	Most High	Sid Sriram	
2023	Sidharth	Do The Dance	Sid Sriram	
2023	Sidharth	Quiet Storm	Sid Sriram	
2023	Sidharth	Dear Sahana	Sid Sriram	
2023	Sidharth	The Hard Way	Sid Sriram	
2023	Sidharth	Blue Spaces	Sid Sriram	
2023	Sidharth	Friendly Fire	Sid Sriram	
2023	Sidharth	Stance	Sid Sriram	
2023	Sidharth	Amelia	Sid Sriram	
2023	Sidharth	Shoulda Been There	Sid Sriram	
2023	Sidharth	Came Along	Sid Sriram	
2023	Sidharth	Standstill	Sid Sriram	
2023	Sidharth	Cliqueless	Sid Sriram	

==== Tamil ====
Year	Song	Composer	Ref
2017	"Kalam Salaam- A Tribute to Dr. APJ Abdul Kalam"	Ghibran	
2017	"Po Po Yen"	A.H.Kaashif	
2018	"Chinanjiru"	Sid Sriram	
2018	"Kannil Mazhai"	B Prasanna	
2018	"Kaadhal"	A.H.Kaashif	
2020	"Arivum Anbum"	Ghibran	
2022	"Adhaaram"	Priya Mali	

==== Telugu ====
Year	Album	Song	Composer	Ref
2022	Lollipop	"Modati Saari"	Vijay Bulganin	

=== Composer ===
Year	Film	Director	Notes	Ref
2020	Vaanam Kottattum	Dhana Sekaran		

=== Playback singing ===
==== Tamil ====
Year	Film	Song	Composer	Co-artist(s)/Note(s)
2013	Kadal	"Adiye"	A. R. Rahman	
2015	I	"Ennodu Nee Irundhaal"	A. R. Rahman	
2015	I	"Ennodu Nee Irundhaal"(Reprise)	A. R. Rahman	Chinmayi
2015	Naanum Rowdy Dhaan	"Yennai Mattrum Kadhale"	Anirudh Ravichander	
2016	24	"Mei Nigara"	A. R. Rahman	
2016	Achcham Yenbadhu Madamaiyada	"Thalli Pogathey"	A. R. Rahman	
2016	Kavalai Vendam	"Nee Tholaindhaayo"	Leon James	
2016	Kattappavae Kaanom	"Hey Penne"	Santhosh Dhayanidhi	
2016	Rum	"Alladhe Siragiye"	Anirudh Ravichander	
2017	Veera	"Verrattaama Verratturiye"	Leon James	
2017	Yaadhumagi Nindraai	"Aagayam Thaayaga"	Ashwin Vinayagamoorthy	
2017	Server Sundaram	"Kannal Modhadhey"	Santhosh Narayanan	
2017	Sachin: A Billion Dreams (D)	"Sachin Sachin"	A. R. Rahman	
2017	Mersal	"Maacho"	A. R. Rahman	
2017	Meyaadha Maan	"Nee Mattum Podhum"	Pradeep Kumar	
2018	Tik Tik Tik	"Kurumba"	D. Imman	
2018	Pyaar Prema Kaadhal	"High on Love"	Yuvan Shankar Raja	
2018	Kanaa	"Oonjala"	Dhibu Ninan Thomas	
2018	Vidhi Madhi Ultaa	"Un Nerukkam"	Ashwin Vinayagamoorthi	Chinmayi
2018	2.0	"Endhira Logathu Sundariye"	A. R. Rahman	Shashaa Tirupati
2018	2.0	"Raajaali"	A. R. Rahman	
2018	Vada Chennai	"Ennadi Maayavi Nee"	Santhosh Narayanan	
2018	Sarkar	"OMG Ponnu"	A. R. Rahman	Jonita Gandhi
2018	Kaatrin Mozhi	"Po Urave"	A H Kaashif	
2019	Viswasam	"Kannaana Kanney"	D. Imman	
2019	LKG	"Tamizh Anthem Song"	Leon James	Chinmayi, Vani Jairam, P. Susheela, L. R. Eswari
2019	Thadam	"Inaye"	Arun Raj	Padmalatha
2019	Airaa	"Kaariga"	Sundaramurthy KS	
2019	Uriyadi 2	"Vaa Vaa Penne"	Govind Vasantha	
2019	Mr. Local	"Nee Nenacha"	Hiphop Tamizha	
2019	Monster	"Anthi Maalai"	Justin Prabhakaran	
2019	NGK	"Anbae Peranbae"	Yuvan Shankar Raja	Shreya Ghoshal
2019	Gorilla	"Yaaradiyo"	Sam C.S.	
2019	Kadaram Kondan	"Thaarame Thaarame"	Ghibran	
2019	Dear Comrade	"Pularaadha"	Justin Prabhakaran	
2019	Bakrid	"Aalanguruvigala"	D. Imman	
2019	Oththa Seruppu Size 7	"Kulirudha Pulla"	Santhosh Narayanan	
2019	Namma Veettu Pillai	"Unkoodave Porakkanum"	D. Imman	
2019	Adithya Varma	"Yaen Ennai Pirindhai"	Radhan	
2019	Adithya Varma	"Yaarumilla"	Radhan	
2019	Enai Noki Paayum Thota	"Maruvaarthai"	Darbuka Siva	
2019	Enai Noki Paayum Thota	"Maruvaarthai"(Restrung Version)	Darbuka Siva	
2019	Enai Noki Paayum Thota	"Visiri"	Darbuka Siva	Shashaa Tirupati
2019	Enai Noki Paayum Thota	"Maruvaarthai"(Unplugged)	Darbuka Siva	
2019	Angelina	"Oru Naal"	D. Imman	
2019	Jasmine	"Lesa Valichudha"	C. Sathya	
2019	Pancharaaksharam	"Theerathe"	Sundaramurthy KS	
2020	Psycho	"Unna Nenachu"	Ilaiyaraaja	
2020	Psycho	"Neenga Mudiyuma"	Ilaiyaraaja	
2020	Vaanam Kottattum	"Kannu Thangom"	Sid Sriram	
2020	Vaanam Kottattum	"Easy Come Easy Go"	Sid Sriram	
2020	Vaanam Kottattum	"Poova Thalaiyaa"	Sid Sriram	
2020	Vaanam Kottattum	"En Uyir Kaatre"	Sid Sriram	
2020	Vaanam Kottattum	"Thinam Thinam"	Sid Sriram	
2020	Oh My Kadavule	"Kadhaippoma"	Leon James	
2020	Dharala Prabhu	"Kaadhal Theevey"	Sean Roldan	
2020	Theeviram	"Nee Meendum Vaa (Promo Song)"	Kalacharan	
2021	Maara	"Yaar Azhaippadhu "	Ghibran	
2021	Bhoomi	"Uzhava"	D. Imman	
2021	Anbirikiniyal	"Sanjaaram"	Javed Riyaz	
2021	Teddy	"En Iniya Thanimaye"	D. Imman	
2021	99 Songs	"Jwalaamukhi"(Reprise)	A. R. Rahman	
2021	Netrikann	"Idhuvum Kadandhu"	Girishh Gopalakrishnan	
2021	Naduvan	"Kaalai Athikaalai"	Dharan Kumar	
2021	Aranmanai 3	"Rasavaachiye"	C. Sathya	
2021	Udanpirappe	"Othapana Kaatteri"	D. Imman	
2021	Annaatthe	"Saara Kaattrae"	D. Imman	Shreya Ghoshal
2021	Annaatthe	"Yennuyirey" (Male)	D. Imman	
2021	Murungakkai Chips	"Edho Solla"	Dharan Kumar	
2021	Pushpa	"Srivalli"	Devi Sri Prasad	
2021	Thalli Pogathey	"Idhaya Idhaya"	Gopi Sundar	
2021	WWW	"Maehaveli"	Simon K. King	
2021	Pisaasu 2	"Uchanthala Regaiyile"	Karthik Raja	
2022	Marutha	"Illama Irunthe Enakku"	Ilaiyaraaja	
2022	Mudhal Nee Mudivum Nee	"Mudhal Nee Mudivum Nee"	Darbuka Siva	
2022	Valimai	"Mother Song (Version 1)"	Yuvan Shankar Raja	
2022	Radhe Shyam	"Thiraiyoadu Thoorigai"	Justin Prabhakaran	
2022	Yutha Satham	"Thailaanguyil"	D. Imman	
2022	Veetla Vishesham	"Paapa Paattu"	Girishh G.	
2022	Poikkal Kudhirai	"Chellamey"(Male)	D. Imman	
2022	Viruman	"Kanja Poovu Kannala"	Yuvan Shankar Raja	
2022	Liger	"En Vanathil Vandha"	Tanishk Bagchi	
2022	Brahmāstra: Part One – Shiva	"Theethiriyaai"	Pritam	
2022	Brahmāstra: Part One – Shiva	"Deva Deva"	Pritam	Jonita Gandhi
2022	Kanam	"Amma Song"	Jakes Bejoy	
2022	Naane Varuvean	"Pinju Pinju Mazhai"	Yuvan Shankar Raja	
2022	Coffee with Kadhal	"Baby Gurl"(Reprise)	Yuvan Shankar Raja	
2022	Love Today	"Ennai Vittu"	Yuvan Shankar Raja	
2022	Kaari	"Saanjikkava"	D. Imman	
2022	DSP	"Annapoorani"	D. Imman	
2022	Rajini	"Thuru Thuru Kangal"	Amrish	
2022	Andhagan	"En Kaadhal"	Santhosh Narayanan	
2022	Paper Rocket	"Kaalai Maalai"	Dharan Kumar	
2022	Theenkirai	"Avizhaadha Kaalai"	Prakash Nikki	
2022	Mathimaran	"Boologame"	Karthik Raja	
2022	Kattil	"Koyililea"	Srikanth Deva	
2023	Pathu Thala	"Nee Singam Dhan"	A. R. Rahman	
2023	Rudhran	"Unnodu Vaazhum"	G.V. Prakash Kumar	
2023	Tamilarasan	"Thamizhanoda Veeramellaam"	Ilaiyaraaja	
2023	Takkar	"Nira"	Nivas K. Prasanna	
2023	Regina	"Sooravali Pola"	Sathish Nair	
2023	Salmon 3D	"Kaadhal En Kaviye"	Sreejith Edavana	
2023	Aneethi	"Poo Naazhi Pon Naazhi"	G. V. Prakash Kumar	
2023	Kolai	"Neekumizho"	Girishh G.	
2023	Adiyae	"Vaa Senthaazhini"	Justin Prabhakaran	
2023	Kushi	"Aradhya"	Hesham Abdul Wahab	Chinmayi
2023	Shot Boot Three	"Paal Mazhaiyin Thooralil"	Rajhesh Vaidhya	
2023	The Road	"Oh Vidhi"	Sam C. S.	
2024	Lal Salaam	"Ae Pulla"	A. R. Rahman	
2024	Siren	"Netru Varai"	G. V. Prakash Kumar	
2024	Maharaja	"Thayee Thayee"	B. Ajaneesh Loknath	
2025	Dragon	"Vazhithunaiye"	Leon James	Sanjana Kalmanje
2025	Retro	"The One"	Santhosh Narayanan	Shan Vincent de Paul, Santhosh Narayanan
2025	Oho Enthan Baby	"Oho Enthan Baby Title Track"	Jen Martin	
2025	Ezhumalai (D)	"Raakkatchi"	D. Imman	
2026	Kadhal Reset Repeat	"Unnai Ninaithu"	Harris Jayaraj	
2026	KD: The Devil (D)	"Kaalainga Poal"	Arjun Janya	
2026	Ram In Leela	"Yaar Yaarival"	Ankit Menon	Sawai Bhatt
2026	Anbil Avan	"Kalla Nikkiriye"	Govind Vasantha	
2026	Anbil Avan	"Aasai Varame" (Rock Version)	Govind Vasantha	Chinmayi Sripada
2026	Baththa	"Mozhiye"	Sai Abhyankkar	
2026	Renigunta 2	"Ekavali"	Manu Ravichandran	Sabhareesh
2026	Nooru Kodi Vaanavil	"Po Podhum Po"	Siddhu Kumar	

==== Telugu ====
Year	Film	Song	Composer	Writer(s)	Co-artist(s)	Note(s)
2013	Kadali	"Yadike"	A. R. Rahman	Vanamali		Dubbed
2015	I	"Nuvvulte Naa Jathaga"	A. R. Rahman	Ramajogayya Sastry	Issrath Quadhri	Dubbed
2015	I	"Nuvvulte Naa Jathaga"(Reprise)	A. R. Rahman	Ramajogayya Sastry	Issrath Quadhri	Dubbed
2016	24	"Manasuke"	A. R. Rahman	Chandrabose	Jonita Gandhi, Sanah Moidutty	Dubbed
2016	Sahasam Swasaga Sagipo	"Vellipomaakey"	A. R. Rahman	Sreejo	Dinesh Kanagaratnam	
2017	Ninnu Kori	"Adiga Adiga"	Gopi Sundar	Sreejo		
2017	Adirindhi	"Maayo"	A. R. Rahman	Rakendu Mouli	Shweta Mohan	Dubbed
2018	Geetha Govindam	"Inkem Inkem"	Gopi Sundar	Ananta Sriram		
2018	Geetha Govindam	"Vachindamma"	Gopi Sundar	Sri Mani		
2018	Neevevaro	"Vennela Vennela"	Prasan	Sreejo		
2018	Shailaja Reddy Alludu	"Egiregirey"	Gopi Sundar	Krishna Kanth		
2018	Devadas	"Emo Emo Emo"	Mani Sharma	Sirivennela Seetharama Sastry		
2018	Nawaab	"Praaptham"	A. R. Rahman	Rakendu Mouli		Dubbed
2018	Husharu	"Undiporaadhey"	Radhan	Kittu Vissapragada		
2018	Husharu	"Undiporaadhey"(Sad)	Radhan	Kittu Vissapragada		
2018	Taxiwaala	"Maate Vinadhuga"	Jakes Bejoy	Krishna Kanth		
2018	Taxiwaala	"Maate Vinadhuga"(Remix)	Jakes Bejoy	Krishna Kanth		
2018	Sarkar	"Vulikithe Vudhyamam"	A. R. Rahman	Chandrabose	Srinidhi Venkatesh	Dubbed
2018	Sarkar	"OMG Pilla"	A. R. Rahman	Vanamali	Jonita Gandhi	Dubbed
2018	2.0	"Yanthara Lokapu"	A. R. Rahman	Ananta Sriram	Shashaa Tirupati	Dubbed
2018	Padi Padi Leche Manasu	"Emai Poyave"	Vishal Chandrashekhar	Krishna Kanth		
2019	Suryakantham	"Inthena Inthena"	Mark K Robin	Krishna Kanth	Shakthisree Gopalan	
2019	Suryakantham	"Nenena Nenena"	Mark K Robin	Krishna Kanth		
2019	ABCD: American Born Confused Desi	"Mella Mellaga"	Judah Sandhy	Krishna Kanth	Aditi Bhavaraju	
2019	NGK	"Prema O Prema"	Yuvan Shankar Raja	Chandrabose	Hemambika	Dubbed
2019	Dear Comrade	"Kadalalle"	Justin Prabhakaran	Rehman	Aishwarya Ravichandran	
2019	Falaknuma Das	"Aarerey Manasa"	Vivek Sagar	Kittu Vissapragada		
2019	Rakshasudu	"Chinni Chinni"	Ghibran	Sri Mani		
2019	Gang Leader	"Ninnu Choose"	Anirudh Ravichander	Ananta Sriram		
2019	Madhanam	"Yegire Yegire"	Ron Ethan Yohann	Purna Chary	Chinmayi	
2019	Tholu Bommalata	"Manasaara"(Male)	Suresh Bobbli	Chaitanya Prasad		
2019	Tholu Bommalata	"Manasaara"(Duet)	Suresh Bobbli	Chaitanya Prasad	Chinmayi	
2019	Thoota	"Maruvaali"	Darbuka Siva	Ananta Sriram		Dubbed
2019	Thoota	"Yetu Manam"	Darbuka Siva	Chaitanya Prasad	Shashaa Tirupati	Dubbed
2020	Ala Vaikunthapurramuloo	"Samajavaragamana"(Male)	S. Thaman	Sirivennela Seetharama Sastry		
2020	Choosi Choodangaane	"Nee Parichayamutho"	Gopi Sundar	Ananta Sriram		
2020	Raahu	"Emo Emo"	Praveen Lakkaraju	Srinivasa Mouli		
2020	Nishabdham	"Ninne Ninne"	Gopi Sundar	Bhaskarabhatla		
2020	Orey Bujjiga	"Ee Maya Peremito"	Anup Rubens	Kittu Vissapragada		
2020	Orey Bujjiga	"Kalalu Choosina"	Anup Rubens	Kasarla Shyam		
2020	Solo Brathuke So Better	"Hey Idhi Nenena"	S. Thaman	Raghuram		
2021	30 Rojullo Preminchadam Ela	"Neeli Neeli Aakasham"	Anup Rubens	Chandrabose	Sunitha Upadrashta	
2021	Sashi	"Okey Oka Lokam"	Arun Chiluveru	Chandrabose		
2021	Rang De	"Naa Kanulu Yepudu"	Devi Sri Prasad	Sri Mani		
2021	Vakeel Saab	"Maguva Maguva"(Male)	S. Thaman	Ramajogayya Sastry		
2021	99 Songs	"Jwalamukhi"(Reprsie)	A. R. Rahman	Rakendu Mouli		Dubbed
2021	99 Songs	"Nee Choope Naaku"	A. R. Rahman	Rakendu Mouli		Dubbed
2021	Ardha Shathabdham	"Ye Kannulu Choodani"	Nawfal Raja AIS	Rehman		
2021	Ishq: Not A Love Story	"Aanandam Madhike"	Mahathi Swara Sagar	Sri Mani	Sathya Yamini	
2021	SR Kalyanamandapam	"Choosale Kallaara"	Chaitan Bharadwaj	Krishna Kanth		
2021	Paagal	"Amma Amma Nee Vennela"	Radhan	Ramajogayya Sastry		
2021	Paagal	"Aagave Nuvvagave"	Radhan	Krishna Kanth		
2021	Raja Raja Chora	"Nijam Idhe Kadha"	Vivek Sagar	Krishna Kanth		
2021	Dear Megha	"Baagundhi Ee Kaalame"	Gowra Hari	Krishna Kanth		
2021	Most Eligible Bachelor	"Manasa Manasa"	Gopi Sundar	Surendra Krishna		
2021	Most Eligible Bachelor	"Leharaayi"	Gopi Sundar	Ananta Sriram, Sri Mani		
2021	Varudu Kaavalenu	"Kola Kalle Ilaa"	Vishal Chandrashekhar	Rambabu Gosala		
2021	Miles Of Love	"Theliyadhe"	RR Dhruvan	Alaraju		
2021	Manchi Rojulochaie	"So So Ga"	Anup Rubens	Krishna Kanth		
2021	Pushpaka Vimanam	"Kalyanam"	Ram Miriyala	Kasarla Shyam	Mangli, Mohana	
2021	Pushpa: The Rise	"Srivalli"	Devi Sri Prasad	Chandrabose		
2021	WWW: Who Where Why	"Nailu Nadhi"	Simon K. King	Ramajogayya Sastry	Kalyani Nair	
2022	Atithi Devo Bhava	"Baguntundhi Nuvvu Navvithe"	Shekar Chandra	Bhaskarabhatla	Nutana Mohan	
2022	Bangarraju	"Naa Kosam"	Anup Rubens	Balaji		
2022	Hero	"Acha Telugandhame"	Ghibran	Ramajogayya Sastry		
2022	Malli Modalaindi	"Alone Alone"	Anup Rubens	Krishna Chaitanya		
2022	Sehari	"Idhi Chaala Baagundhi Le"	Prashanth R Vihari	Kittu Vissapragada		
2022	Radhe Shyam	"Nagumomu Thaarale"	Justin Prabhakaran	Krishna Kanth		
2022	Nallamala	"Yemunnave Pilla"	PR			
2022	Sarkaru Vaari Paata	"Kalaavathi"	Thaman S			
2022	Major	"Hrudhayama"	Sricharan Pakala			
2022	Chor Bazaar	"Kadhaladhu Paadham"	Suresh Bobbili			
2022	Shikaaru	"Manasu Dhaari Thappene"	Shekar Chandra			
2022	Ramarao on Duty	"Bul Bul Tarang"	Sam C. S.			
2022	Liger	"Kalalo Kooda"	Tanishk Bagchi	Bhaskarabhatla		
2022	Aakaasha Veedhullo	"Ayyayyayyo Ayyayyayyo"	Judah Sandhy	Gautham Krishna		
2022	Brahmāstra	"Kumkumla"	Pritam	Chandrabose		Dubbed
2022	Oke Oka Jeevitham	"Amma Song"	Jakes Bejoy	Sirivennela Seetharama Sastry		
2022	Kotha Kothaga	"Priyatama"	Shekar Chandra	Ananta Sriram		
2022	Ori Devuda	"Avunanavaa"	Leon James			
2022	Jetty	"Dhooram Karigina"	Karthik Kodakandla	Sri Mani		
2022	Urvasivo Rakshasivo	"Dheemthanana"	Achu Rajamani			
2022	Masooda	"Daachi Daachi"(Male)	Prashanth R Vihari	Chaitanya Pingali		
2022	HIT: The Second Case	"Urike Urike"	M. M. Srilekha			
2022	18 Pages	"Yedurangula Vaana"	Gopi Sundar			
2022	Leharaayi	"Merupai Merisaave"	Ghantadi Krishna	Ghantadi Krishna		
2022	Rajahyogam	"Raasi Petti"	Arun Miraleedharan	Rehman		
2022	Top Gear	"Vennela Vennela"	Harshavardhan Rameshwar			
2023	Michael	"Neevuntey Chaalu"	Sam C. S.			
2023	IPL (It's Pure Love)	"Yevarive Prema Hrudayama"	Vengi			
2023	Taxi	"Vevela Thaarale"(Male)	Mark K Robin			
2023	Taxi	"Vevela Thaarale"(Duet)	Mark K Robin			
2023	Geetha Sakshiga	"Andhaala Chandhanamavey"	Gopi Sundar			
2023	Shaakuntalam	"Rushivanamlona"	Mani Sharma		Chinmayi	
2023	Ahimsa	"Neethoney Neethoney"	R. P. Patnaik			
2023	Regina	"Thalape Thoofaanai"	Sathish Nair			
2023	Ninnu Chere Tharunam	"Korukona Swasey"	Karthik Kumar Rodriguez	Rehman		
2023	Hathya	"Neeti Budage"	Girishh G.			
2023	Dilse	"Nuvu Leni Lokamlo"	Srikar Velamuri			
2023	Kushi	"Aradhya"	Hesham Abdul Wahab		Chinmayi	
2023	Skanda	"Nee Chuttu Chuttu"	Thaman S	Raghuram	Sanjana Kalmanje	
2023	Spark Life	"Yema Andham"	Hesham Abdul Wahab	Anantha Sriram		
2023	Maayalo	"Avunanna Kaadhanna"(Male)	Dennis Norton	Kadali		
2023	Maayalo	"Avunanna Kaadhanna"(Duet)	Dennis Norton	Kadali	Brinda	
2023	Pandhiri Mancham	"Kovelalo"	Srikanth Deva	Rakendu Mouli		
2023	Thika Maka Thanda	"Ohho Puththadi Bomma"	Suresh Bobbili			
2023	Devil: The British Secret Agent	"Maaye Chesey"	Harshavardhan Rameshwar	Sathya RV		
2024	Mechanic	"Nachesave Pilla Nachesave"	Vinod Yajamanya			
2024	Ooru Peru Bhairavakona	"Nijame Ne Chebuthunna"	Shekar Chandra	Sri Mani		
2024	Masthu Shades Unnai Raa	"Hello Ammayi"	Sanjeev T			
2024	Lambasingi	"Nachechesindhe Nachchesindhe"	RR Dhruvan	Kasarla Shyam		
2024	The Family Star	"Nanadanandanaa"	Gopi Sundar	Anantha Sriram		
2024	Krishnamma	"Emavuthundho Manalo"	Kaala Bhairava			
2024	Kanaledhe Nuvvani	"Kanaledhe Nuvvani"	Jadhav Ayaan	Lakshman Ganga		
2024	Zamana	"Cheliya Telusa Telusa"	Keshav Kiran	Rehman		
2024	Veekshanam	"Ennennenno"	Samarth Gollapudi	Rehman		
2024	Nuvvante Nenani	"Nammave Cheli"	Varikuppala Yadagiri			
2024	Chakori	"Naa Chelive"	Leander Lee Marty	Chitran		
2024	Pisachi 2	"Kaalamentha Vegamule"	Karthik Raja			Dubbed
2024	Diamond Raja	"Aakashame Neevai"	Achu Rajamani		Chinmayi	
2024	Risk	"Sogasuke Soku"	Ghantadi Krishna			
2024	Love Reddy	"Koyilamma"	Kalyan Nayak			
2024	Gam Gam Ganesha	"Brundavanive"	Chaitan Bharadwaj	Vengi Sudhakar		
2024	Maruthi Nagar Subramanyam	"Madam Sir Madam Anthe"	Kalyan Nayak	Bhaskarabhatla		
2025	Sundarakanda	"Bahusa Bahusa"	Leon James	Sri Harsha Emani		
2025	Oka Padhakam Prakaram	"Osaarilaa Raa"	Rahul Raj	Rehman		
2025	Oka Padhakam Prakaram	"Kanulalo"	Rahul Raj	Rehman		
2025	Tribanadhari Barbarik	"Neevalle"	Infusion Band	Raghuram		
2025	Akkada Ammayi Ikkada Abbayi	"Modhati Chinuku"	Radhan	Chandrabose	Aishwarya Kumar	
2025	HIT: The Third Case	"Prema Velluva"	Mickey J. Meyer	Krishna Kanth	Nutana Mohan	
2025	Brat	"Yuddhamae Raanee"	Arjun Janya	Sanare	Sireesha Bhagavatula	Dubbed
2025	Telusu Kada	"Mallika Gandha"	Thaman S	Krishna Kanth		
2025	Elumalai	"Raa Chilaka"	D. Imman	Ramajogayya Sastry		Dubbed
2026	Gharga	"Nela Nadiga"	R. P. Patnaik	Balaji		
2026	KD: The Devil	"Dammunna"	Arjun Janya	Chandrabose		Dubbed
2026	Korean Kanakaraju	"Kamsahamnida"	Thaman S	Kasarla Shyam		
2026	Sangeet	"Nee Valle"	Achu Rajamani	Vikram Shiva		
2026	Comrade Kalyan	"Oriya Pilla"	Vijai Bulganin	Bhaskarabhatla		
2026	VISA - Vintara Saradaga	"Chingari"	Vijai Bulganin	Sanare	Lipsika	
2026	Renigunta 2	"Ekavali"	Manu Ravichandran	Dr. Challa Bhagyalakshmi, Mashook Rahman	Sabhareesh	Dubbed
2026	The Red Bag	"Nee Venake"	Sekar Mopuri	Tirupathi Jaavana		

==== Malayalam ====
Year	Film	Song	Composer	Co-artist(s)
2017	Mersal (D)	"Maacho"	A. R. Rahman	Chinmayi
2019	Dear Comrade (D)	"Madhu Pole Peytha"	Justin Prabhakaran	
2019	Ishq	"Parayuvaan"	Jakes Bejoy	
2019	Manoharam	"Akale"	Sanjeev T	
2020	Gauthamante Radham	"Uyire"	Ankit Menon	
2020	Maniyarayile Ashokan	"Olu"	Sreehari K Nair	
2021	Thala	"Poonkodiye"	Ankit Menon	
2021	Kudukku 2025	"Maaran"	Bhoomee	Bhoome
2021	Pushpa (D)	"Srivalli"	Devi Sri Prasad	
2021	Laljose	"Sundaripenne"	Binesh Mani	
2022	Mike	"Nee"	Hesham Abdul Wahab	
2022	Oh Meri Laila	"Karalo Veruthe"	Ankit Menon	
2023	Kattil (D)	"Kovilonnil"	Srikanth Deva	
2025	Narivetta	"Minnalvala"	Jakes Bejoy	Sithara Krishnakumar
2025	Hridayapoorvam	"Venmathi"	Justin Prabhakaran	
2025	Athi Bheekara Kaamukan	"Premavathi"	Bibin Ashok	
2026	Avaraachan and Sons	"Churulmudi Churulo"	Sanal Dev	Zeba Tommy
2026	Khalifa	"Asalayavale"	Jakes Bejoy	Mohammed Maqbool Mansoor
2026	Bouma	"Paarum Paaraake"	Christo Xavier	

==== Kannada ====
Year	Film	Song	Composer	Co-artist(s)
2019	Dear Comrade (D)	"Kadalanthe Kaada Kannu"	Justin Prabhakaran	
2021	Tom And Jerry	"Hayagide"	Mathews Manohar	
2021	Bhajarangi 2	"Nee Sigoovaregu"	Arjun Janya	
2021	Pushpa (D)	"Srivalli"	Devi Sri Prasad	
2021	Love You Rachchu	"Muddu Neenu"	Manikanth Kadri	
2021	Sakath	"Shuruvagidhe"	Judah Sandhy	
2022	Love 360	"Jagave Neenu"	Arjun Janya	
2023	Mancha (D)	"Deguladi"	Srikanth Deva	
2025	Andondittu Kaala	"Mungaru Maleyalli"	Raghavendra V	
2025	Elumale	"Yaavaaga Yaavaaga"	D. Imman	
2025	Brat	"Naane Neenanthe"	Arjun Janya	
2026	Karavali	"Muddu Gumma"	Sachin Basrur	
2026	Brindavihari	"Radha Radha"	Hesham Abdul Wahab	Chinmayi
2026	Ayogya 2	"Mudd Muddu Putlakshmi"	Arjun Janya	Prithwi Bhat
2026	Lakshmi Puthra	"Amma Na Haadu"	Arjun Janya	
2026	Mahaan	"Odahuttidavale" (Male Version)	Arjun Janya	
2026	Hosajeevana	"Yeneno Hambala"	Sumukha Rao	
2026	Shankarabharanna	"Sakhiye"	Charan Raj	

==== Hindi ====
Year	Film	Song	Composer	Writer(s)	Co-artist(s)	Note(s)
2022	Jhund	"Laat Maar"	Ajay–Atul	Amitabh Bhattacharya	Sourabh Abhyankar	
2022	Jhund	"Baadal Se Dosti"	Ajay–Atul	Amitabh Bhattacharya		

==== Marathi ====
Year	Film	Song	Composer(s)	Writer(s)	Co-artist(s)
2022	Har Har Mahadev	"Wah Re Shiva"	Hitesh Modak	Mangesh Kangane	
2023	Jaggu Ani Juliet	"Kadhi Na Tula"	Ajay-Atul	Guru Thakur	

== Awards and nominations ==
Year	Award	Category	Song	Film	Result	Ref.
2016	63rd Filmfare Awards South	Best Male Playback Singer – Tamil	''Ennodu Ne Irudhaal''	I	Won	
2016	5th South Indian International Movie Awards	Best Playback Singer Male	''Ennodu Ne Irudhaal''	I	Nominated	
2017	64th Filmfare Awards South	Best Male Playback Singer – Tamil	"Mei Nigara"	24	Nominated	
2017	6th South Indian International Movie Awards	Best Playback Singer - Male	''Thalli Pogathey''	Achcham Yenbadhu Madamaiyada	Nominated	
2017	Asiavision Awards	Best Playback Singer - Male (Tamil)	''Thalli Pogathey''	Achcham Yenbadhu Madamaiyada	Won	
2018	65th Filmfare Awards South	Best Male Playback Singer – Tamil	''Macho''	Mersal	Nominated	
2018	7th South Indian International Movie Awards	Best Playback Singer - Male	''Macho''	Mersal	Won	
2018	65th Filmfare Awards South	Best Male Playback Singer – Telugu	''Adiga Adiga''	Ninnu Kori	Nominated	
2018	7th South Indian International Movie Awards	Best Male Playback Singer – Telugu	''Adiga Adiga''	Ninnu Kori	Nominated	
2019	Behindwoods Gold Medals	Voice of the year	''High on Love''	Pyaar Prema Kaadhal	Won	
2019	66th Filmfare Awards South	Best Male Playback Singer – Tamil	''High on Love''	Pyaar Prema Kaadhal	Won	
2019	SIIMA Awards	Best Playback Singer - Male	''High on Love''	Pyaar Prema Kaadhal	Nominated	
2019	66th Filmfare Awards South	Best Male Playback Singer – Telugu	''Inkem Inkem''	Geetha Govindam	Won	
2019	8th South Indian International Movie Awards	Best Male Playback Singer – Telugu	''Inkem Inkem''	Geetha Govindam	Nominated	
2020	Zee Cine Awards Tamil	Best Playback Singer - Male	"Kannaana Kanney"	Viswasam	Won	
2021	Sakshi Excellence Awards	Best Playback Singer - Male	"Samajavaragamana"	Ala Vaikunthapurramuloo	Won	
2021	9th South Indian International Movie Awards	Best Male Playback Singer – Telugu	"Aarerey Manasa"	Falaknuma Das	Nominated	
2021	9th South Indian International Movie Awards	Best Playback Singer - Male	"Parayuvan"	Ishq	Nominated	
2021	9th South Indian International Movie Awards	Best Playback Singer - Male	"Unna Nenachu"	Psycho	Nominated	
2021	9th South Indian International Movie Awards	Best Playback Singer - Male	"Olu"	Maniyarayile Ashokan	Nominated	
2022	10th South Indian International Movie Awards	Best Playback Singer - Male	"Hayagide"	Tom & Jerry	Nominated	
2022	10th South Indian International Movie Awards	Best Playback Singer - Male	"Idhuvum Kadandhu Pogum"	Netrikann	Nominated	
2022	10th South Indian International Movie Awards	Best Male Playback Singer – Telugu	"Srivalli"	Pushpa: The Rise	Nominated	
2024	69th Filmfare Awards South	Best Male Playback Singer – Telugu	"Aradhya"	Kushi	Nominated	
2024	69th Filmfare Awards South	Best Male Playback Singer – Tamil	"Nira"	Takkar	Nominated	
2025	Telangana Gaddar Film Award	Best Playback Singer - Male	"Nijame Ne Chebutunna"	Ooru Peru Bhairavakona	Won	
