= Srivalli (song) =

2021 song by Devi Sri Prasad, Chandrabose and Sid Sriram

- Official song cover

Single by Devi Sri Prasad and Chandrabose featuring Sid Sriram

from the album Pushpa: The Rise
- Language: Telugu
- Released: 13 October 2021
- Recorded: 2020–2021
- Genre: Pop; chill-out
- Length: 3:41
- Label: Aditya Music
- Composer: Devi Sri Prasad
- Lyricist: Chandrabose
- Producer: Devi Sri Prasad

Pushpa: The Rise track listing
- 1. "Daako Daako Meka"; 2. "Srivalli"; 3. "Saami Saami"; 4. "Eyy Bidda Idhi Naa Adda"; 5. "Oo Antava Oo Oo Antava"

Music video
- "Srivalli" on YouTube

"Srivalli" is an Indian Telugu-language song composed by Devi Sri Prasad, with lyrics by Chandrabose and recorded by Sid Sriram for the soundtrack album of the 2021 film Pushpa: The Rise. It was released on 13 October 2021 (released on YouTube as a lyrical video song) as the second single from the album, through Aditya Music. The full video song, featuring scenes directly from the film, was released on 4 January 2022 on YouTube.

The song was also released in Hindi, Tamil, Kannada and Malayalam languages with the same title and was included in the respective dubbed versions of the film. The song was produced by Aditya Music in Bengali with the same title and was released in July 2023. The hook leg-dance step in the film, performed by the lead actor Allu Arjun became widely popular and a pop-cultural phenomenon.

"Srivalli" experienced large amounts of commercial success. Although the song and the film were released in 2021, it had a consecutive commercial success throughout 2022, in which it debuted at number one on the Billboard India Songs and retained the position for nine consecutive weeks.

== Production, lyrics and recording ==
Sid Sriram has also recorded the song in Tamil, Kannada and Malayalam languages. Javed Ali and Usha Uthup have recorded the song in Hindi and Bengali languages respectively.

In an interview with The Telegraph, Devi Sri Prasad said that the song's primary recording was completed in four-and-a-half minutes. He further said that "After I heard the situation, I wanted to put the heroine’s name in the song. From the name Srivalli, I just tapped ‘record’ and started singing the tune".

Devi Sri Prasad had initially planned to replace the Hindi version title with "Sridevi" as he felt that Srivalli is the name of a South Indian girl. The team had tried three to four variations and Javed Ali (singer of Hindi version) has even recorded the song as Sridevi instead of Srivalli but weren't satisfied. Later, Ali suggested that the word Srivalli was gelling well with the composition and so decided to retain it.

== Music video ==
=== Background and production ===
As part of the film's production, the scenes involved in the music video of the song were shot exclusively at the Thirumalai Kovil, Panpoli in Tamil Nadu, India.

Jani Master choreographed the dance sequences. The popular Srivalli hook-step was idealised by the film's director Sukumar. The Times of India reported that "....Allu Arjun had injured his foot and while attempting the choreography would often lose grip of his sandal and drag his foot around. That’s when Sukumar decided to incorporate the foot-dragging movement as an actual step in the track and even added that extra zing with the slipper sliding off".

=== Synopsis ===
The music video is a direct clip from the scenes in Pushpa: The Rise. The scenes feature Allu Arjun, Rashmika Mandanna and Jagadeesh Prathap Bandari primarily.

== Commercial performance ==
The song received widespread acclaim from the audience. In February 2022, it debuted at number one in the inaugural Billboard India Songs chart and retained number one nine consecutive weeks. The music video of the song became YouTube India's 2022 top music video, as declared by the YouTube's official charts. The Hindi version of the song is the most viewed Indian music video of 2022 on YouTube, with over 55.2 crore (552 million) by the end of 2022. The Hindi version music video currently has more than 63 crore (630 million) views. It has become one of the top-10 most searched regional songs in 2023 on Amazon Alexa in India, alongside "Saami Saami", "Oo Antava Oo Oo Antava", "Naatu Naatu", "Butta Bomma" and others.

== Live performances ==
Sid Sriram has performed the song during the pre-release event of the film in Hyderabad, India prior to film's release in December 2021. During the event Sriram performed the song in the absence of music caused by a technical glitch, acknowledging the same Allu Arjun has praised his performance in the Instagram post he shared. He has performed the song at the Coachella 2024 in California, U. S. in April 2024.

== Credits and personnel ==
Credits adapted from YouTube.

- Devi Sri Prasad – composer, banjo and melodica
- Chandrabose – lyrics
- Sid Sriram – vocals
- Vikas Badisa – keyboards
- Kalyan – rhythm
- Manomani – saranagi
- S P Abhishek – live musicians supervision
- Deepak – chorus
- Vignesh – chorus
- Shenbagaraj – chorus
- Narayanan – chorus
- Thipparthy Uday Kumar – chorus
- A. Uday Kumar – mix engineer, mastering engineer, record engineer
- T. Uday Kumar – record engineer
- Suresh Kumar Taddi – record engineer
- Murugan – orchestra in-charge
- Pugalendhi – studio assistant
- R Raja – studio assistant
- V Dhinakaran – studio assistant

== Charts ==
Weekly chat performance for "Srivalli"
Chart (2021–2022)	Peak position
India (Billboard)	1
UK Asian Music Chart (OCC)	13

== Accolades ==
Award (Note: Awards, festivals and organizations are in alphabetical order.)	Date of ceremony (Note: Date is linked to the article about the awards held that year, wherever possible.)	Category	Recipient(s)	Result	Ref.
Filmfare Awards South	9 October 2022	Best Playback Singer – Male	Sid Sriram	Won	
Mirchi Music Awards	8 March 2022	Male Vocalist of The Year	Javed Ali (Note: For the Hindi version)	Won	
Sakshi Excellence Awards	21 October 2022	Most Popular Lyricist	Chandrabose	Won	
Sakshi Excellence Awards	21 October 2022	Most Popular Singer – Male	Sid Sriram	Won	
South Indian International Movie Awards	10 September 2022	Best Lyricist – Telugu	Chandrabose	Won	
South Indian International Movie Awards	10 September 2022	Best Male Playback Singer – Telugu	Sid Sriram	Won	

== Impact and legacy ==
Daisy Shah and Adil Khan have recreated the music video which involves the scenes from the film and the music. Dutch singer Emma Heesters performed a cover of the song which was released on 4 February 2022, with lyrics translated to English. Likewise, there were many cover versions created and released by various artistes including the languages the song is not originally produced. It became a pop cultural phenomenon in India to perform or recreate the song and the music from the soundtrack. The official band of the Mumbai Police performed the song in March 2022. Karthik Keramalu of Deccan Herald opined that the song has catchy lyrics and music which made it find to wider audience quickly other than the Telugu speakers. In their list titled "Allu Arjun Songs That Have Become Signature Hook Steps", Outlook has included the song "Srivalli" alongside five other songs of Allu Arjun.

The dance moves popularly known as Srivalli hook-step, performed by Allu Arjun became a pop cultural phenomenon worldwide. In the article, "Reels in Reviews", Meta Platforms declared that "Srivalli" is one of the top used songs on the Instagram Reels and other products of Meta Platforms'. The dance-step was recreated optionally with music, on social media including various movie stars and celebrities. In an Instagram video posted by Australian cricketer David Warner, he have performed the song including the dance steps. Later, during an ongoing match in 2023 Cricket World Cup, he have again performed the dance step in October 2023. Dwayne Bravo, Hardik Pandya, Suresh Raina, Varun Dhawan, Suryakumar Yadav, Ishan Kishan, Yashika Aannand, Anita Hassanandani, Rohit Suchanti, Virat Kohli and several others have recreated the hook-step.
