= Panpoli =

Panpoli Panpozhi Panboli
- TownPanchayat
- Nicknames: PaimPozhil, Pambli, Panboli
- Location in Tamil Nadu, India
- Coordinates: 9°01′25.3″N 77°14′55.4″E
- Country: India
- State: Tamil Nadu
- District: Tenkasi

Population (2011)
  - Total: 9,313

Languages
  - Official: Tamil
  - Other Languages: Malayalam
- Time zone: UTC+5:30 (IST)
- PIN: 627807
- Telephone code: 04633
- Sex ratio: 1.015 ♂/♀
- Literacy: 88%

Panpoli is a village (Town panchayat) situated near Sengottai Taluk in Tenkasi district, Tamil Nadu, India.

== Demographics ==
As of the 2011 Census of India, Panpoli had a population of 9,313 spread over 2,619 households.

== Civic Administration ==
Panpoli has been entitled to 15 wards as a Town Panchayat.

== Economy ==
Panpoli's economy is mainly agro-based. The Village acts as a focal point for food grains transported from the adjoining areas of the Tirunelveli, Thoothukudi, virudhunagar and Madurai districts and Kerala mainly. Furthermore, there are many males working overseas and sending back money to their families. The locals are therefore doing better in many ways, with some of them building bigger houses and other buildings.

There have been ongoing public upgrades such as roadworks in the area over the past year.

== Agriculture ==
Agriculture in Panpoli is the main source of livelihood for most of the people of Panpoli. Rice and Coconut Cultivation have been the major occupation of the local inhabitants. since the land is ideally suited for growing crops like Rice and coconut.

== Transportation ==
=== Local buses ===
Bus Routes Tenkasi-Thirumalaikovil (SAT, SRT, and 20Lss) Shencottai-kadayanallur (12C,12D,12F and 12E Lss and Jappan) Vadakari-Tenkasi, Kovilpatti-Thirumalaikovil, Shencottai (MRG, KR), Tirunelveli-Thirumalaikovil/ Achankovil (101 Sfs), Surandai-Thirumalaikovil (20M Lss) Sivagiri, Rajapalayam-shencottai (Kayesar), Alangulam-mekkarai (Jayaram), mekkarai-Tenkasi,(Vadakarai) KERALA/TN TRANSPORT - Achankovil, Punalur, Kollam.

=== Buses to Chennai, Bangalore, Madurai ===
- Chennai ultra-deluxe buses
- 184 UD, Five buses are Regularly operated from Sengottai,
- 184 UD, video coach A/c- Non A/c. Sliper
- Maximum All Private Omani Buses service Near SCT-Tenkasi

=== Trains ===
Trains available at Sengottai (4 km From Panpoli) include:

- Sengottai – Madurai Passenger
- Sengottai – Chennai Egmore Pothigai Express
- Sengottai - Tirunelveli Passenger
- Sengottai – Chennai Silambu Express via Manamadurai, Thanjavur, Mayiladuthurai (Daily)
- Sengottai – Tambaram Express
- Kollam – Chennai Egmore Express
- Punalur – Sengottai Passenger

These two depots operate buses from Sengottai to various cities of Tamil Nadu, Puducherry and Kerala. The main cities are Chennai, Tirupur, Coimbatore, Trichy, Madurai, Tiruchendur, Tuticorin, Srivilliputtur and Ramanathapuram in Tamil Nadu and Thiruvananthapuram UD, Pathanamthitta, Kottarakkara, Kottayam, Guruvayur, Punalur, and Quilon (Kollam) in Kerala and Pondicherry in Puducherry.

== Educational institutions ==
=== Schools ===
- EMR Govt.Hr Secondary School
- RKV Middle School (Panpoli)
- Rasheeth Primary School
- St.Joseph Matric school
- Panchayat Union primary school
- Royal Primary nursery school
- Joy Nursery and Primary School

=== Colleges near Panpoli ===
- Sri Parasakthi College for Women (Courtallam)
- JP Engineering College (Ayikudi)
- Nallamani Yadava College of Art and Science (Kodikuruchi)
