= India Songs =

Weekly song chart in India published by Billboard

The India Songs is a record chart in India for songs. It has been compiled by Billboard and Luminate since February 2022. The chart is updated every Wednesday at Billboard website (UTC). The chart consists of 25 songs.

The first number-one song on the chart was "Srivalli" by Sid Sriram on the issue dated February 19, 2022.

== Methodology ==
The chart tracks songs' performance from Friday to Thursday, and is made available on Tuesday morning. The chart includes 25 songs, ranked based on streaming data, and digital sales provided by MRC Data.

== Artist achievements ==
=== Most number-one singles ===
Total songs	Artist	Ref.
2	Sidhu Moose Wala	

=== Most weeks at number one ===
Total weeks	Artist
32	Sidhu Moose Wala
9	Sid Sriram
6	Ananya Bhat
5	Hariharan
2	Kaala Bhairava

=== Most single-week entries ===
Entries	Artist	Date	Ref.
6	Sidhu Moose Wala	June 18, 2022	
5	Sidhu Moose Wala	June 11, 2022	
4	Sidhu Moose Wala	July 2, 2022	
3	Sidhu Moose Wala	June 25, 2022	

== Song milestones ==
=== Most weeks at number one ===
No. of weeks	Song	Artist	Release year	Language
11	"295"	Sidhu Moose Wala	2022	Punjabi
11	"Mehbooba"	Ananya Bhat	2022	Kannada
11	"Shree Hanuman Chalisa"	Hariharan	2022	Hindi; Sanskrit
9	"Srivalli"	Sid Sriram	2022	Telugu
2	"Komuram Bheemudho"	Kaala Bhairava	2022	Telugu

== List of number-one songs ==
#	Reached number one	Artist(s)	Single	Weeks at number one	Language	References
1	February 19, 2022	Sid Sriram	"Srivalli"	9	Telugu	
2	April 23, 2022	Hariharan	"Shree Hanuman Chalisa"	5	Awadhi	
3	May 7, 2022	Ananya Bhat	"Mehbooba"	6	Kannada	
4	May 21, 2022	Kaala Bhairava	"Komuram Bheemudho"	2	Telugu	
5	June 11, 2022	Sidhu Moose Wala	"The Last Ride"	14	Punjabi	
6	June 18, 2022	Sidhu Moose Wala	"295"	18	Punjabi	
7	August 6, 2022	Arijit Singh	"Kesariya"	3	Hindi	
8	August 27, 2022	Nakash Aziz and Sunidhi Chauhan	"Ra Ra Rakkamma"	1	Kannada	
9	September 3, 2022	Blackpink	"Pink Venom"	1	Korean; English	

== See also ==
- Hits of the World
- IMI International Top 20 Singles
