= Beeramguda =

- Town
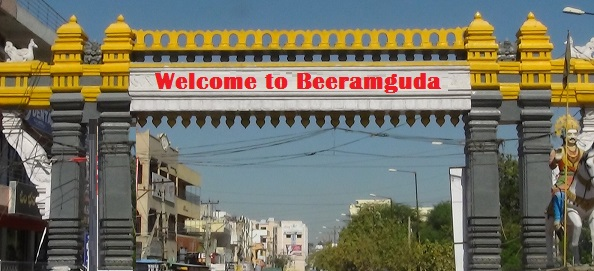
- The Beeramguda Kaman (Archway) entrance

- Location within Hyderabad Location within Telangana Location within India
- Coordinates: 17°31′08″N 78°18′24″E
- Country: India
- State: Telangana
- District: Sangareddy
- Mandal: Ameenpur mandal

Beeramguda is a town in the Sangareddy district of the Indian state of Telangana. It is part of the Ameenpur mandal and is situated within the Hyderabad Metropolitan Development Authority limits. The town is known for the Bhramarambhika Mallikarjuna Swamy Temple located on the Beeramguda Gutta hill.

== Geography and development ==
Beeramguda has experienced significant residential growth due to its proximity to the HITEC City and Gachibowli IT hubs. The local landscape is characterized by the Beeramguda Lake and the surrounding Deccan rock formations. In 2018, a statue of the Telangana revolutionary Chakali Ilamma was unveiled near the lake as part of local beautification efforts.

== Transport ==
The area is connected via the NH 65. The nearest railway stations are located at Lingampally and Chanda Nagar. The Miyapur metro station serves as the nearest link to the Hyderabad Metro.

== Religious sites ==
The Bhramarambha Mallikarjuna Swamy Temple is the primary landmark, attracting large crowds during the Maha Shivaratri festival. The temple complex includes shrines dedicated to Ganesha, Parvati, and Kartikeya. Other local temples include the Venkateswara Swamy and Venu Gopala Swamy temples.
