= Pushpa: The Rise =

2021 Indian film by Sukumar

- Theatrical release poster
- Directed by: Sukumar
- Written by: Sukumar
- Dialogues by: Srikanth Vissa
- Produced by: Naveen Yerneni; Yalamanchili Ravi Shankar
- Starring: Allu Arjun; Rashmika Mandanna; Fahadh Faasil
- Cinematography: Miroslaw Kuba Brozek
- Edited by: Karthika Srinivas; Ruben
- Music by: Devi Sri Prasad
- Production companies: Mythri Movie Makers; Muttamsetty Media
- Distributed by: See distribution
- Release date: 17 December 2021
- Running time: 179 minutes
- Country: India
- Language: Telugu
- Budget: ₹200–250 crore (Note: The Tribune, News 18, Outlook, GQ India, Mashable India, NDTV and The Times of India stated the budget as ₹200 crore. But The Indian Express and Zoom reported the budget as ₹250 crore.)
- Box office: ₹350–360 crore

Pushpa: The Rise (Telugu pronunciation: [puʂpa]) is a 2021 Indian Telugu-language action drama film directed by Sukumar and produced by Mythri Movie Makers, together with Muttamsetty Media. The first installment in the Pushpa film series, it stars Allu Arjun, alongside an ensemble cast of Rashmika Mandanna, Fahadh Faasil (in his Telugu debut), Jagadeesh Prathap Bandari, Sunil, Anasuya Bharadwaj, Rao Ramesh, Ajay and Ajay Ghosh, Dhananjaya,Shatru. The film follows Pushpa, a daily wage labourer from Chittoor Jilla who rises through the ranks of a syndicate involved in smuggling red sandalwood, a rare wood found only in the Seshachalam Hills of Andhra Pradesh.

The film began production in December 2019 but was halted in March 2020 by the COVID-19 pandemic. Filming resumed in November 2020 and ended in November 2021, primarily taking place at Ramoji Film City in Hyderabad and the Maredumilli forest in Andhra Pradesh. The music was composed by Devi Sri Prasad, with cinematography by Miroslaw Kuba Brozek.

Pushpa: The Rise was released worldwide on 17 December 2021 in theatres to mixed reviews from critics, who praised the performances, action choreography, cinematography, direction, dialogues, and soundtrack but criticised the runtime, screenplay, plot, editing and its similarities with the KGF franchise. The film was commercially successful, grossing over ₹350–360 crore at the worldwide box office. It became the highest-grossing Indian film of 2021 and ranks among the highest-grossing Telugu films of all time.

At the 69th National Film Awards, Pushpa: The Rise won two awards – Best Actor (Arjun) and Best Music Direction (Prasad). At the 67th Filmfare Awards South, it won seven awards meant for Telugu films, including Best Film, Best Director (Sukumar) and Best Actor (Arjun). The 74th Berlinale retrospectively featured it in 2024. A sequel titled Pushpa 2: The Rule was released on 5 December 2024.

== Plot ==
In the late 1990s, Pushpa Raju, a fiercely proud labourer in the Seshachalam forests, begins working as a red sandalwood cutter alongside his friend Kesava. Employed by mid-level smuggler Konda Reddy, Pushpa quickly rises through the ranks by outsmarting the relentless Deputy Superintendent of Police (DSP), Govindappa, and devising ingenious ways to transport contraband past police checkpoints. Impressed by his resourcefulness, regional kingpin Mangalam Srinu entrusts Konda Reddy with a large consignment, which is subsequently placed in Pushpa's care. However, Konda Reddy's jealous younger brother, Jaali Reddy, sabotages a shipment to have Pushpa arrested. Pushpa evades the ambush and saves the cargo. At a celebration hosted by Srinu, he discovers that Srinu has been embezzling much of the syndicate's profits. Pushpa informs Konda Reddy, who refuses to confront Srinu immediately because of his power.

Pushpa falls in love with Srivalli, a local milk vendor, but their engagement is violently disrupted by Mohan, Pushpa's estranged half-brother, who publicly denies his right to use their deceased father's surname and exposes his illegitimate birth. Pushpa's mother, Parvatamma, is injured in the ensuing fight, strengthening Pushpa's determination to build an empire of his own. He leaves Srinu's supply chain and establishes a direct smuggling pipeline to Murugan, a Chennai-based international buyer, agreeing to share the independent profits with Konda Reddy. Meanwhile, Jaali Reddy discovers that Srivalli's father is a police informant for Govindappa and captures him. He blackmails Srivalli, demanding sexual favours in exchange for her father's life. After she confides in Pushpa, he brutally beats Jaali, leaving him temporarily paralysed.

Fearing an internal war, Konda Reddy takes Pushpa to a secluded forest clearing under the pretence of executing him. Before he can act, they are ambushed by Srinu's brother-in-law, Mogileesu, and rival hitmen. Pushpa kills Mogileesu and saves Konda's other brother, Jakka Reddy, but Konda Reddy is killed in the chaos. At his funeral, Member of Parliament (MP) Siddhappa Naidu intervenes to prevent a gang war. After learning of Srinu's financial deception, Naidu strips him of his authority and appoints Pushpa to control the entire smuggling syndicate.

As Pushpa consolidates his control of the illegal trade, Srinu's vengeful wife, Dakshayani, vows to destroy him over Mogileesu's death. Meanwhile, the ruthless and arrogant police officer Bhanwar Singh Shekawat arrives as the new district police chief. Before marrying Srivalli, Pushpa offers Shekawat a monthly bribe in exchange for his cooperation. Shekawat instead treats him as an inferior criminal, insulting his lineage and demanding complete submission.

On the night of his wedding, Pushpa invites Shekawat to a secluded location for a drink and turns the tables, threatening him and forcing him to strip to his underwear. Pushpa strips as well, explaining that his self-respect is inherent to his character, whereas Shekawat's authority depends entirely on his uniform. He mocks Shekawat, claiming that without it even his guard dog would not recognise him. Pushpa leaves to complete his wedding rituals, while Shekawat returns home humiliated. When the dog fails to recognise him in the dark, Shekawat shoots it, then burns Pushpa's bribe money and vows revenge. When Srivalli later asks whether his struggles are finally over, Pushpa ominously replies that the war has only just begun.

== Cast ==
- Allu Arjun as Pushpa Raju
  - Master Dhruvan as Young Pushpa Raju
- Rashmika Mandanna as Srivalli
- Fahadh Faasil as Bhanwar Singh Shekhawat
- Dhananjaya as Jaali Reddy, Konda Reddy and Jakka Reddy's younger brother
- Rao Ramesh as MP Bhumireddy Siddappa Naidu
- Sunil as Mangalam Srinu
- Brahmaji as Sub-Inspector Kupparaj, Bhanwar's junior official
- Anasuya Bharadwaj as Dakshayani "Daksha", Srinu's wife
- Jagadeesh Prathap Bandari as Kesava aka Mondelu
- Kalpa Latha as Parvatamma, Pushpa's mother
- Shatru as DSP Govindappa
- Ajay as Molleti Mohan Rao, Pushpa's elder half-brother
- Ajay Ghosh as Konda Reddy
- Raj Tirandasu as Mogileesu, Srinu's brother-in-law
- Shanmukh as Jakka Reddy, Konda Reddy's elder brother
- Dayanand Reddy as Muniratnam, Srivalli's father
- Bala Parasar
- Sritej as Molleti Krishna Rao, Pushpa's second elder half-brother
- Jagadam Giri
- Kancharapalem Kishore
- Jeevan Kumar Naidu
- Dil Ramesh
- Vamsiraj Nekkanti
- Pavani Karanam as Pushpa's niece and Mohan's daughter
- Karan Vijay
- Temper Vamsi
- Akshara Nunna as Krishna Rao's wife and Srivalli's sister-in-law
- Divya Sripada as Srivalli’s friend
- Sneha Madhuri Sharma as Srivalli’s friend
- Mime Gopi as Chennai Murugan, a smuggler
- Rajsekhar Aningi as Subba Reddy
- Samantha Ruth Prabhu (special appearance in the item number "Oo Antava Oo Oo Antava")

== Production ==
=== Development ===
Post the success of Rangasthalam (2018), Sukumar narrated a script to Mahesh Babu, with whom he previously worked in 1: Nenokkadine (2014). Babu, who liked the story, gave a nod to the project and was reported to start the shoot after completing Vamshi Paidipally's project Maharshi (2019). In mid-April 2018, Mythri Movie Makers, which collaborated with Sukumar in their previous film Rangasthalam, officially announced the project which was tentatively titled as #SSMB26, thus marking their second collaboration with Babu and Sukumar. (Note: Mythri Movie Makers, made their debut in film production, with Mahesh Babu's Srimanthudu (2015)) The film was expected to begin in January 2019, but, in that March, Babu walked out of Sukumar's project, citing creative differences, and he confirmed this through Twitter. The actor instead signed his next project with Anil Ravipudi titled Sarileru Neekevvaru, Whereas Sukumar approached Allu Arjun for his next film, marking his reunion with the director after a decade since Arya 2 (2009); Mythri Movie Makers, which earlier associated with Babu and Sukumar's project, also agreed to produce the venture.

In an interview with Press Trust of India, Sukumar stated, "I couldn't make Mahesh Babu cool. He is very fair. So, the backdrop was the same but the story is different."

=== Pre-production ===
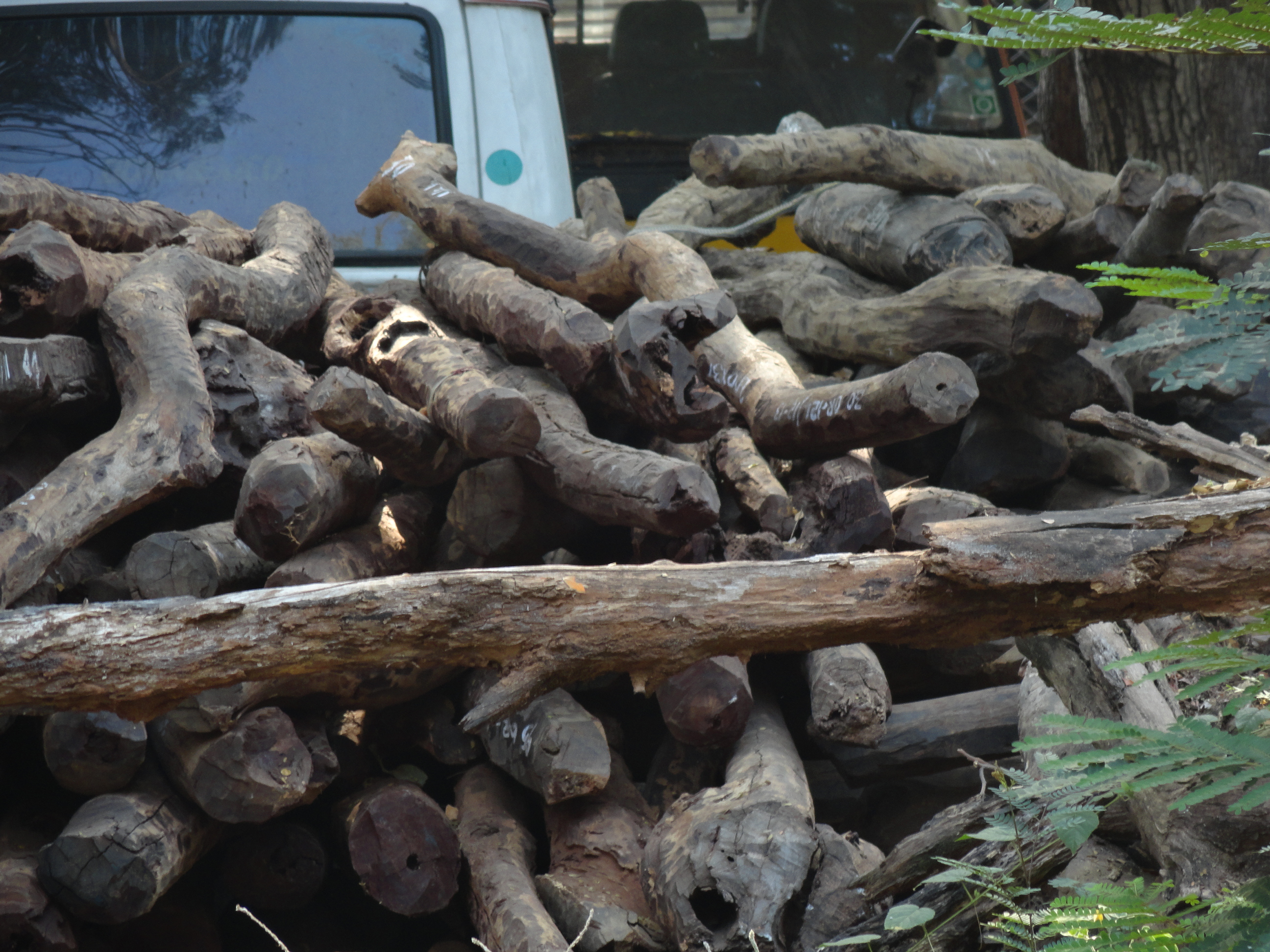
The plot revolves around the smuggling of red sandalwood (image pictured).

Sukumar described the storyline as follows: "The red sanders heist in the hills of Andhra is a convoluted nexus that unfurls in the course of the narrative through a coolie-turned-smuggler." Sukumar explored the subject of red sandalwood smuggling when he read about such incidents in Andhra Pradesh years ago. Sukumar did his research and thought of developing the project as a web series. However, he later decided to turn the project into a feature film. He personally went for location scouting across Nallamala Hills, as the film is set in Rayalaseema and Nellore, and the plot revolves around red sanders smuggling. Since most of the film takes place in a rural backdrop, Allu Arjun was reported to have learned the Chittoor accent for the film, and the makers hired a team from Bollywood to work on his look. Seshachalam forest, located in the hilly region of Tirumala, serves as the backdrop for the story. Polish cinematographer Miroslaw Kuba Brozek, who worked for Nani's Gangleader (2019) was signed for the film. Karthika Srinivas performed the film's editing, whereas Mounika and Ramakrishna, the art directors of Sukumar's previous film Rangasthalam (2018) were chosen for production design. Resul Pookutty signed for the film's sound design, along with Vijay Kumar. The film's title Pushpa was officially announced on 8 April 2020, on the occasion of Allu Arjun's birthday, and a poster was also released.

=== Casting ===
Allu Arjun played the titular character Pushpa Raj, a red-sanders smuggler, and sported a bearded look for his role in the film. Rashmika Mandanna was cast as the film's lead actress, with an official announcement made on Allu Arjun's birthday (8 April 2019). Mandanna in an online interaction confirmed that she will be learning a new dialect for the film, like Arjun, which is slightly based on the dialect of Chittoor. Jisshu Sengupta was originally offered to play the antagonist but he refused due to the ongoing COVID-19 pandemic and time constraints. Vijay Sethupathi entered talks to play the antagonist in October 2019, having worked with Sukumar in the director's production venture Uppena (2021), and was confirmed to be part of the film in January 2020. However, in July 2020, Sethupathi left the film citing scheduling conflicts. Post Sethupathi's exit, Vikram, Bobby Simha, Madhavan and Arya were reported to be playing negative roles in the film, but ultimately Malayalam actor Fahadh Faasil was announced as the film's antagonist in March 2021, thus marking his debut in Telugu cinema. For his role in the film, Fahadh sported a bald look and a rough moustache.

In April 2020, reports indicated that Kannada actor Dhananjaya would play a pivotal role. The film's second schedule cast Sunil in a supporting role in November 2020. Reports suggested that Sunil's character exhibited ambiguity in the film. Despite reports of Anasuya Bharadwaj playing a crucial role, she later clarified that no one approached her for the film. However, Bharadwaj joined the film's shooting in April 2021. Sritej confirmed his casting as Pushpa Raj's brother in July 2021. The film had three antagonists, with Sunil and Anasuya being the antagonists in the first part, Fahadh's character, Bhanwar Singh Shekhawat, who is the main antagonist, will only make an appearance at the end of the first part and will persist throughout its sequel Jagadeesh was cast by Sukumar after he watched his performances in the films Mallesham (2019) and George Reddy (2019). In an interview, Jagadeesh Prathap Bandari revealed that he had left 15 smaller projects for working in the film. Samantha joined the production in late-November 2021. She shot for the item song "Oo Antava Oo Oo Antava" alongside Allu Arjun and others. On working in the song, she said that "being sexy is next level hard work".

=== Filming ===
In July 2019, the makers planned to start filming during the occasion of Dusshera (7 October 2019). However, the launch event of the film took place on 30 October 2019, with a formal puja ceremony (muhurat shot) held in Hyderabad at the office of Mythri Movie Makers, with the film's cast and crew being present at the event. In December 2019, Sukumar performed a test shoot in Kerala's Athirappilly Falls. After Allu Arjun's involvement in the promotions of Ala Vaikunthapurramuloo (2020), the makers planned to shoot the first schedule of the film in Kerala in March 2020, with Arjun joining the schedule, however, the filming was halted due to COVID-19 pandemic in India.

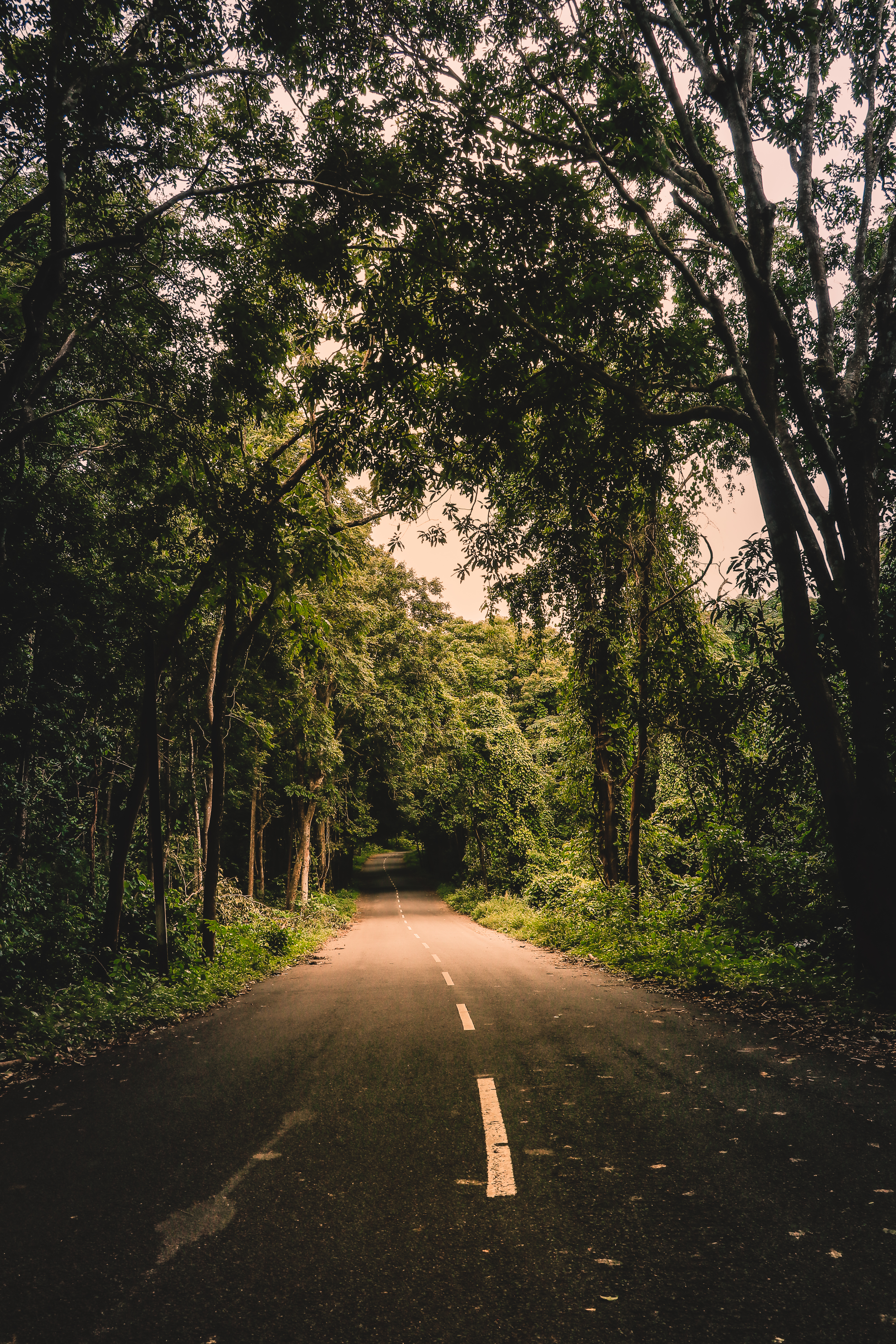
The majority of the film was shot in Maredumilli, Andhra Pradesh.

For a 6-minute action sequence in the film, the team planned to hire action choreographers from South India, instead of opting for foreign technicians. Thus, the film became a "Make In India" project, and an initiative to provide employment to the workers from the Indian film industry, after some technicians faced employment crisis due to the pandemic. This sequence was reported to be made a cost of ₹6 crore (US$620,000) and Allu Arjun trained intensively for it.

In June 2020, the makers planned to resume the shoot at Ramoji Film City in Hyderabad, and later planned to shoot the film at Nalgonda. After the government permitted film shootings with a minimal crew, the makers resumed filming on 10 November 2020 in the Maredumilli forest in Andhra Pradesh, and completed it within 14 days. The team then moved to Rajahmundry in December 2020 to shoot key sequences, but that was postponed to January 2021, as twelve crew members working on the film were diagnosed with COVID-19. The shooting later resumed in January 2021 and the production house tweeted that two schedules at Rampachodavaram and Maredumilli were completed within February 2021. The team also finished a schedule at Kerala in March 2021.

The shooting of the film was put on hold due to restrictions following the second wave of COVID-19 pandemic in India, and Allu Arjun was also diagnosed with COVID-19 in late April. The team resumed the final leg of shooting on 6 July 2021, with a major schedule filmed in Secunderabad, but came to a halt on 24 July 2021 when Sukumar was diagnosed with dengue fever. The filming resumed after Sukumar recovered from the disease. On 22 August 2021, Fahadh Faasil joined the shooting schedule of the film. After wrapping her portions in the Hindi film Goodbye, Rashmika joined the shoot to film her parts. In September 2021, she rejoined the shoot after a brief break. On 8 September, Allu Arjun headed to Maredumilli to film the final schedule. After a month-long production, on 4 October, the team started shooting face-off scenes between Allu Arjun and Fahadh Faasil. The song "Srivalli" was mainly shot in Thirumalai Kovil, Tenkasi district of Tamil Nadu. Finally, a special song featuring Samantha was filmed in November 2021 at a specially constructed set at the Ramoji Film City and "Ey Bidda Idi Na Adda" (transl. "This is my area") song was filmed at the Mallikarjun Swami Temple of Beeramguda. After this, the film entered a post-production phase.

Speaking to the media at a promotional event of the Tamil version in Chennai, Allu Arjun said that "We had about 400–500 cars in the forest that would take us from point A to B. In some places, there were no roads and we had to create a pathway with whatever was available. The filming itself took us almost two years, that is why I say this: the effort we had put in for Pushpa is equal to four films."

=== Post-production ===
The dubbing of the film began in April 2021. Ten days before the release of the film, Shreyas Talpade confirmed that he has dubbed for Allu Arjun for the film's Hindi version. In the Hindi version, Rajesh Khattar and Sahil Vaid dubbed for Fahad Faasil and Jagadeesh Prathap Bandari respectively. Jis Joy who has dubbed for Arjun's previous films in Malayalam, was signed to dub for Allu Arjun for the Malayalam version, and by the early-December 2021 he had completed his portions of the dubbing. K. P. Sekar lent Allu Arjun's voice for the film's Tamil version. Fahadh Faasil has dubbed for his role in all the languages, except Hindi which was dubbed by Rajesh Khattar.

== Music ==
Sukumar's regular collaborator Devi Sri Prasad composed score and soundtrack of this film. (Note: Allu Arjun, Sukumar and composer Devi Sri Prasad, worked together in Arya and Arya 2.) The soundtrack features five songs written by Chandrabose, including "Daakko Daakko Meka", "Srivalli", "Oo Antava Oo Oo Antava", "Saami Saami", and "Eyy Bidda Idhi Naa Adda".

== Release ==
=== Theatrical ===
Pushpa: The Rise was released on 17 December 2021. Previously, the film was announced to release on 13 August 2021, coinciding with the Independence Day weekend. In May 2021, the makers announced that the film would be releasing in two parts, with the first part coming on the originally intended release date while the second installment will be arriving in 2023. The producers released a statement saying: "The storyline and the characters took on lives of their own and grew to a span that required the movie to be released in two parts", and the title of the film's first part was unveiled as Pushpa: The Rise – Part 1 in August 2021. Due to a surge in the COVID-19 pandemic, the film's release was rescheduled to Christmas 2021. In October 2021, the makers announced the release date as 17 December 2021. It was simultaneously released in Telugu and dubbed versions in Tamil, Kannada, Malayalam and Hindi languages.

Following the release, the makers deleted a controversial scene on fans' demand as they felt it may not go well with the family audience. In the scene, Pushpa (played by Arjun) touches Srivalli's (played by Mandanna) chest and has a conversation about it. It is also reported that a few more scenes were cut to reduce its runtime.

In the later half of 2022, it got officially dubbed in Russian, the production company released Russian-language trailer on YouTube on 29 November 2022 and the film was released in theatres of Russia. The film was screened at the Moscow International Film Festival in 2022. It was screened in the category "Blockbuster hits from around the world".

=== Distribution ===
On 25 June 2021, Eenadu reported that the Hindi dubbing rights were sold for ₹17.3 crore (equivalent to ₹21 crore or US$2.2 million in 2026). Initially Karan Johar's Dharma Productions was reported to have acquired the distribution rights, to present and promote the Hindi version of the film in North Indian theatres. This was reported to be the third South Indian film to be presented by the company after the Baahubali franchise and 2.0 (2018). However, it was also reported that the film's Hindi version will not be a simultaneous theatrical release; instead the Hindi dubbed version will be released directly on YouTube. The Hindi release faced troubles due to legal disputes between the producers and Manish Shah's Goldmines Telefilms, which regularly distributed the Hindi versions of Allu Arjun's previous films. In November 2021, a Hindi-version poster was later released, clarifying that the film will have a theatrical release in Hindi. In the same month it was also reported that the Goldmines Telefilms will distribute the Hindi-dub by collaborating with another production company. On 20 November 2021, it was confirmed through social media that the Hindi distribution would be done by AA Films.

The film was distributed in Tamil Nadu by Lyca Productions and Sri Lakshmi Movies, Swagath Enterprises in Karnataka and by E4 Entertainments in Kerala.

=== Home media ===
Star India Network acquired the satellite rights of the film (except the Hindi version, which was acquired by Goldmines TV), while Amazon Prime Video acquired the digital rights. The film began streaming 21 days later through Amazon Prime Video on 7 January 2022, while the Hindi version began streaming from 14 January 2022. The film was also released in Japanese Blu-ray version on 7 August 2024.

== Reception ==
=== Critical response ===
Pushpa: The Rise received generally mixed reviews from critics, who praised the performances, action choreography, cinematography, direction, dialogues, and soundtrack but criticised the runtime, screenplay and editing.

Bollywood Hungama gave it 3.5/5 rating, noting it as a "Paisa Vasool" (transl. Value for money) film and called Sukumar's screenplay "top notch". The Indian Express gave it 3 out of 5 stars and wrote "Allu Arjun walks away with the film with his strong performance. He embraces his deglamorized look and delivers a memorable performance". Deccan Chronicle gave the film 3 out of 5 stars, and called it a "one-man show" referring to lead actor Allu Arjun. The reviewer added that the latter half was predictable and "Sami Sami" song appears without context with the climax lacking punch. The Times of India critic Neeshita Nyayapati rated the film 3 out of 5 stars and praised Allu's performance, action sequences, direction, cinematography and score but criticised the technical aspects while stating: "Pushpa: The Rise is Allu Arjun's show all the way. He shines in playing this rustic character that is hard on the surface but vulnerable in ways that others don't see." Rating the film 3/5, India Today critic Janani K. praised Allu and Sunil's performances but felt that Mandanna was in the film "only for the male gaze". On technical aspects, she appreciated cinematography and editing but criticised Sukumar's screenplay, calling it "one of the weakest screenplay of his career."

Haricharan Pudipeddi of Hindustan Times called it "Ahaa Oho", writing, "At three-hour-long, Pushpa manages to stay engaging for the most part and never makes sitting through the film tiring. It's a character-driven story and Sukumar needs to be lauded for effectively establishing the character of Pushpa, whose growth couldn't have been handled more satisfyingly." News18 praised the performances, action sequences and soundtrack writing "Overall, the film is a massy entertainer with a decent storyline and is custom-made for Allu Arjun's fans." Reviewing the Hindi dubbed version, Komal Nahata praised Allu's acting and Shreyas Talpade's Hindi dubbing of the Pushpa character. Praising the work of cast and crew, a reviewer from Eenadu opined that Sukumar should have re-thought the runtime and spent more time in the post-production. In ABP News's review, Ravi Bule felt that the story was not fresh but by the style it was expressed in was new. Writing for The News Minute, Sowmya Rajendran said: "Allu Arjun is immensely likable on screen and that keeps Pushpa going despite its lengthy runtime of three hours." Also opining that the film was a bit long, Firstpost's Sankeertana Varma said: "Sukumar has a vision for who Pushpa is, both the character and the film." Calling it a "mixed bag", Sangeetha Devi Dundoo of The Hindu, wrote, "Pushpa – The Rise is riveting in some segments and bland in others. Allu Arjun shoulders the film, but his coming together with Sukumar should have been for a more absorbing narrative."

The Hans India rated the film 2.75 out of 5 stars and wrote, "The first half is quite engaging but the second half moves at a snail pace and bores us to the core. Barring Allu Arjun's exceptional performance, there is nothing else to watch out for in Pushpa." Karthik Keramalu of The Quint rated the film 2.5 out of 5 stars and wrote "The meat of the story doesn't have enough protein to sustain a sequel. Sukumar could have easily wrapped up everything in this movie itself. And now we'll have to sit through three more hours of Shekhawat versus Pushpa." Anji Shetty of Sakshi appreciated the red sandalwood backdrop and Allu's characterisation but felt that the story was predictable and the climax with Fahadh was a disappointment. In her review for BBC Telugu, Sahiti stated Sukumar deviated from his usual style of filmmaking and opted for flat narrative in Pushpa which was one of the film's downsides. Viplove Gupte of News 18 Hindi reviewer also felt the same, he added Mandanna's role was very dull and director doesn't dwell onto how ordinary kid like Pushpa grows up to a goon of his village.

=== Box office ===
On its opening day, Pushpa: The Rise netted ₹44 crore in India with a gross of around ₹53 crore, and set a post-pandemic record for day one. Including the premieres, the film grossed $850,000 in the United States and obtained a worldwide gross of ₹74 crore on its first day. Pushpa grossed over ₹161 crore worldwide in its opening weekend. It netted over ₹107.5 crore in three days, making it the first ₹100 crore weekend in India post-COVID-19 pandemic. Overall, it is the 13th film and fourth South Indian film to achieve this feat. Box Office India reported that the opening would have been higher, if not for the ticket pricing issue in Andhra Pradesh state. An article from The Indian Express analysed the losses incurred by The Rise due to low ticket prices in Andhra. "Pushpa collected a [distributor's] share of a little more than ₹13 crore from the state's 1100 screens. To put this in perspective, in Telangana, the first-day share of Pushpa was pegged at over ₹11 crore from around 600-odd screens," the article stated.

The film's Hindi dubbed version is commercially successful. The Rise's Hindi version netted ₹26.50 crore in its first week, and over ₹62 crore by the end of third weekend. The Rise netted over ₹200 crore in India in two weeks, and became the seventh South India film and the second Allu Arjun film after Ala Vaikunthapurramuloo (2020) to do so. The film grossed ₹300 crore worldwide from all versions by the end of the third weekend, and emerged as the highest-grossing Indian film in 2021. The scale of the dub's commercial gains have been considered unusual, especially as the film was also available on streaming platforms during its Hindi theatrical run. Its success, as well as the popularity of other Telugu films dubbed into Hindi, has been mainly attributed to the film's mass appeal as a masala film during a time when Hindi cinema has focused more on realism and has become more "toned down".

== Accolades ==
At the 69th National Film Awards, Pushpa: The Rise won two awards – Best Actor (Arjun) and Best Music Direction (Prasad).

== Controversies ==
=== Copyright ===
Sukumar and the makers were accused of copyright infringement by the writer Vempalli Gangadhar. In a Facebook post dated 27 August 2020, Gangadhar stated that the storyline which is based on red sandalwood smuggling, was plagiarised from his short story titled "Coolie" written for Sakshi newspaper which was published two years earlier.

=== Lawsuit ===
In December 2021, a lawsuit was filed at a court in Andhra Pradesh against a song in the film titled "Oo Antava Oo Oo Antava" (transl. Will you say yes or will you say no?) by a men's association. According to them, the song portrayed men as casanovas and eve teasers as its lyrics seemingly mock the male gaze. They also asked for a ban on the song.

== Legacy and impact ==
One of the dialogues from the film, "Thaggede Le" ("Jhukega Nahi Saala" [I won't back down] in Hindi version) achieved the cult status and made a huge impact in the Indian pop culture scene. This film is widely regarded as a major contributor to bringing audiences back to Indian cinemas after the COVID-19 pandemic, and its success has made Allu Arjun a Pan-Indian star.

== Sequel ==
Initially planned as a single film, it was later decided to make the film a two-part release. The second part, titled Pushpa 2: The Rule was released on 5 December 2024. A third part titled Pushpa 3: The Rampage is also in development.
