= Thirumalai Kovil =

Temple in India

Thirumalai Kumaraswamy Temple
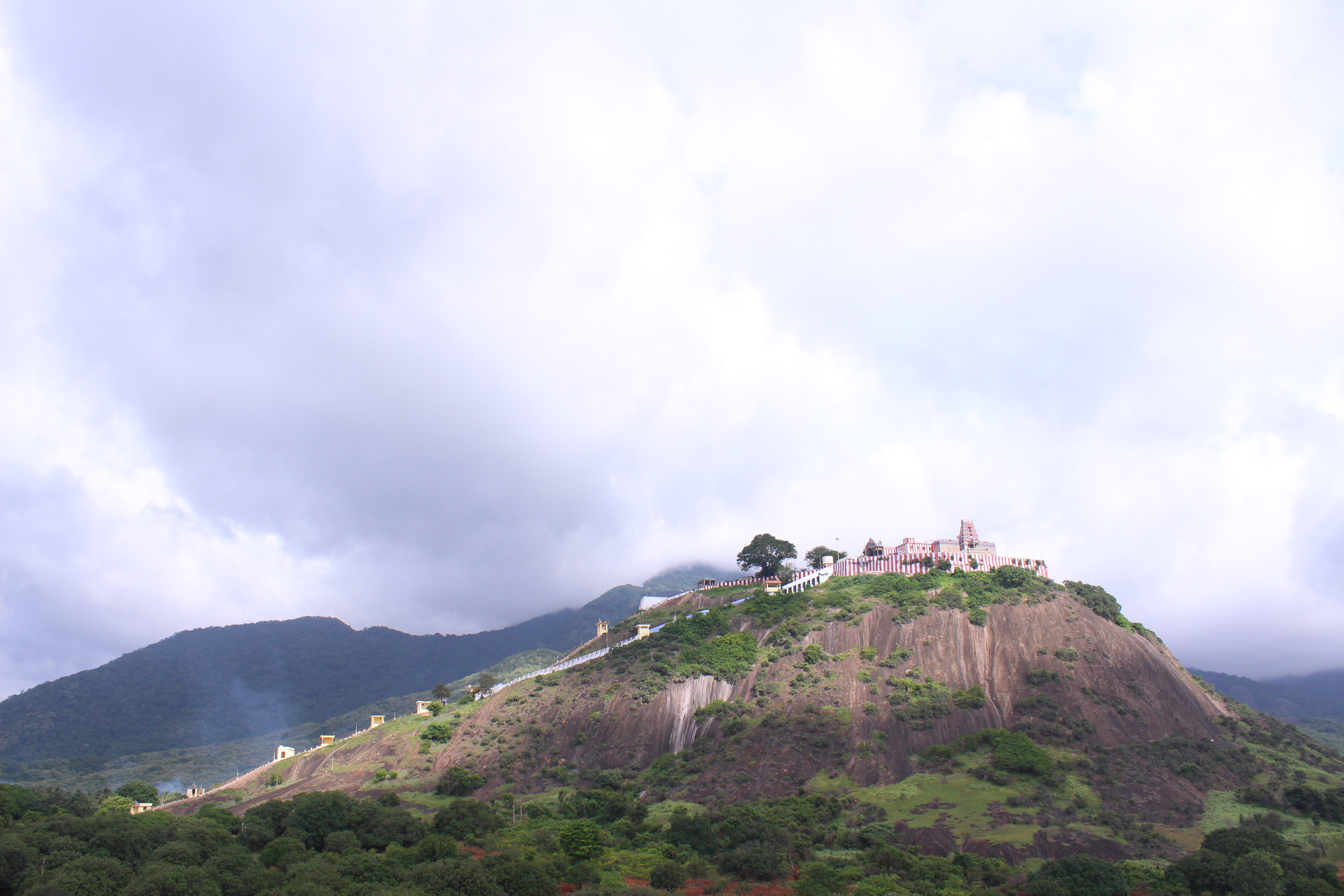

Religion
- Affiliation: Hinduism
- District: Thenkasi
- Festival: Vaikasi Visakam

Location
- Location: Panpoli
- State: Tamil Nadu
- Country: India
- Interactive map of Thirumalai Kumaraswamy Temple
- Coordinates: 9°30′29.9″N 77°37′49.4″E

Architecture
- Type: Dravidian architecture
- Creator: Pandya
- Elevation: 330 m (1,083 ft)

Website
- panpolikumaran.hrce.tn.gov.in

Thirumalai Kovil is a Hindu temple dedicated to the god Murugan, situated at Panpoli, Sengottai in the Tenkasi district of Tamil Nadu, South India. It is about 100 km from Thiruvananthapuram. The temple is situated on a small hill surrounded by the Western Ghats near the border with Kerala.

It is one of the Vaippu Sthalam shrines, which is mentioned in a hymn by the saint Nayanar.

== Description ==
Th temple is a hilltop shrine, with 625 steps of pathway to reach the temple. Earlier, the temple was only accessible by foot. Recently, a road was constructed to the temple on top of the hill.

The presiding deity of the temple, Murugan, is known as 'Thirumalai kumarasamy' or 'Thirumalai murugan'. It is a nakshatra temple, associated with the nakshatra (lunar mansion) Vishakha.

Within the temple premises, there is a goddess shrine called 'Thirumalai Kali amman'. This hill temple is surrounded by many coconut plantations and small villages.

The current temple structure was built by Thiruvarutchelvar Sivakami Ammaiyar.

== Thiruvarutchelvar Sivakami Ammaiyar ==
Thiruvarutchelvar Sivakami Ammaiyar, a devotee of the presiding deity, was born in Neduvayal Achanputhur (near Panpoli, on the Hanuman River) into a wealthy family around 1784 and died in 1854, aged 70. Although she received no secondary education, she was known to read and write. Sivakami Ammaiyar married Kankamuthu, a philanthropic farmer. Kankamuthu was a devotee of Annamalaiyar temple. The couple built a bridge spanning the Hanuman River which is known as Kankamuthu Bridge.

The couple were childless. When a Muslim holy man named Walar Masthan visited their village, the couple requested his counsel. Walar Masthan advised Sivakami Ammaiyar to serve their family god on Thirumalai Murugan hilltop. The god Murugan is also said to have appeared in Sivakami Ammaiyar's dream as a child and to build him a temple on the hilltop. Sivakami Ammaiyar began building the temple, a difficult task due to the elevation; to raise the money needed, she sold all her property.

== Festival ==
The annual temple festival of Thai Pusam is celebrated in the Tamil month of Thai (January and February).

== Poetry ==
- "Thirumalai Andavar Kuravaji" – Author unknown; poem published in Tamil Tatha by Dr. Uu. Ve. Saminathan Iyer
- "Thirumalai Yamah Vanthathi" - Nellai Kavirasu Pandaramars
- "Thirupugazal" - Aunagirinather
- "Thirumalai Kumaraswamy Thirupugazal" - Sankarapandian Pillai
- "Thirumalai Murugan Pillai Tamil" - Kavira Pandarathaiyar
- Poems by Achanputhur N. Subbaih
