= Guntur Kaaram (soundtrack) =

2024 soundtrack album by Thaman S

- Soundtrack album cover

Soundtrack album by Thaman S
- Released: 26 January 2024
- Recorded: 2022–2023
- Genre: Feature film soundtrack
- Length: 18:50
- Language: Telugu
- Label: Aditya Music
- Producer: Thaman S

Thaman S chronology
Annapoorani: The Goddess of Food (2023)	Guntur Kaaram (2024)	Rasavathi (2024)

Singles from Guntur Kaaram
- 1. "Dum Masala" Released: 7 November 2023; 2. "Oh My Baby" Released: 13 December 2023; 3. "Kurchi Madathapetti" Released: 30 December 2023; 4. "Mawaa Enthaina" Released: 10 January 2024; 5. "Ramana Aei" Released: 16 January 2024

Guntur Kaaram is the soundtrack to the 2024 film of the same name, composed by Thaman S, with the soundtrack consisting of six songs written by Ramajogayya Sastry, Gongura, and Trivikram. Five of the songs were released as singles before the soundtrack's official release through the Aditya Music on 26 January 2024.

== Background ==
In August 2021, the producers revealed the film's preliminary cast and crew with Thaman being confirmed to be the music director. The film marked Thaman's fifth collaboration with Babu after Dookudu (2011), Businessman (2012), Aagadu (2014), and Sarkaru Vaari Paata (2022); third collaboration with Trivikram after Aravinda Sametha Veera Raghava (2018) and Ala Vaikunthapurramuloo (2020). Compositions for the film's music began in June 2022.

== Production ==
"Dum Masala" is the first song from the album which was performed by Sanjith Hegde, with additional vocals by Jyoti Nooran. The song is the introductory number for Ramana, that sings praises of his glory and charm. The second track "Oh My Baby" is a romantic number sung by Shilpa Rao.

"Kurchi Madathapetti" is the third song from the album; a dance number picturized on the lead pair, it was earlier reported to be an item number, contrary to Trivikram's earlier films where the director refrained the use of item numbers, before revealed to be a dance number. Performed by Sri Krishna and Sahiti Chaganti, the song also featured Poorna in a special appearance as Ramola. "Kurchi Madathapetti" is based on the viral catchphrase "Aa kurchini madathapetti" (transl. breaking that chair) by Kala Pasha who was referred to as "Kurchi Thatha" after the viral dialogue. This was sampled in the song.

The fourth song "Mawaa Enthaina" is a dance number picturized on Ramana, which was performed by Krishna, Komanduri Ramachari and Rahul Sipligunj. The song was performed at the film's pre-release event held on 9 January 2024. The fifth song "Ramana Aei" was showcased on a fight sequence. The song is performed by Gotte Kanakavva. The sixth song "Amma Song" is a montage number performed by Vishal Mishra.

== Release ==
"Dum Masala" was released as the first single from the album on 7 November 2023, coinciding Trivikram's birthday. The second single "Oh My Baby" was released on 13 December 2023. The third single "Kurchi Madathapetti" was released on the occasion of New Year's Eve (31 December 2023). The fourth single "Mawaa Enthaina" was released on 10 January 2024. Post the film's release, the fifth song "Ramana Aei" was released as a single on 16 January, and the sixth song "Amma Song" was released along with the soundtrack on 26 January 2024.

In late-January, Thaman announced that apart from the six songs, an additional seventh song is set to be released with a promotional lyric video by the following month.

== Track listing ==
No.	Title	Lyrics	Singer(s)	Length
1.	"Dum Masala"	Ramajogayya Sastry, Trivikram Srinivas	Sanjith Hegde, Jyoti Nooran	3:27
2.	"Oh My Baby"	Ramajogayya Sastry	Shilpa Rao	2:36
3.	"Kurchi Madathapetti"	Ramajogayya Sastry	Sri Krishna, Sahiti Chaganti	3:37
4.	"Mawaa Enthaina"	Ramajogayya Sastry	Komanduri Ramachari, Sri Krishna, Rahul Sipligunj	2:32
5.	"Ramana Aei"	Gongura, Trivikram Srinivas	Gotte Kanakavva	2:35
6.	"Amma Song"	Ramajogayya Sastry	Vishal Mishra	4:03
Total length:				18:50

== Background score ==
Guntur Kaaram

Film score by Thaman S
- Released: 10 March 2024
- Recorded: 2022–2023
- Genre: Film score
- Length: 37:50
- Language: Telugu
- Label: Aditya Music
- Producer: Thaman S

The background score was arranged and composed by Thaman S.

Guntur Kaaram (Original Soundtrack)
No.	Title	Length
1.	"Aarambam"	1:30
2.	"The Split"	2:01
3.	"Hero Intro"	3:56
4.	"The Fox"	2:42
5.	"Heroine Intro"	1:04
6.	"Home Coming"	1:28
7.	"The Shadow"	1:14
8.	"Vidwamsam"	2:39
9.	"Intermission"	4:39
10.	"The Twist"	9:09
11.	"The Return"	7:28
Total length:		37:50

== Reception ==
Sangeetha Devi Dundoo of The Hindu wrote "Thaman's score livens up things occasionally." Anandu Suresh of The Indian Express described the songs being a "delight" and the background score, "while powerful, seems somewhat disconnected from the visuals and narrative, particularly in the more intense moments". Paul Nicodemus of The Times of India described that Thaman's music "mirrors the film's inconsistency". Swaroop Kodur of The Federal was more critical of the music as excluding the title track, the music "fails to strike the chord" and felt that Thaman "misses the mark this time around". Film Companion-based critic Ram Venkat Srikar and Firstpost-based Priyanka Sundar criticised the background score being "flat" and "did not even gain miniscule [sic] attention".

== Controversy ==
With speculations regarding the replacement of the film's crew arising during production, Thaman was reported to be ousted from the film with Babu being disappointed with the former's music, after a series of tweets posted on X (formerly Twitter) from the composer. Anirudh Ravichander and Hesham Abdul Wahab were intended to replace him as the composer. However, the production team confirmed that Thaman is still on board for the film.

The song "Oh My Baby" was criticised for its lyrics post release. Ramajogayya Sastry, the song's lyricist, posted a series of tweets replying the trolls online and eventually deactivated his X account as a result of the backlash.
