= Filmfare Award for Best Male Playback Singer – Telugu =

Indian annual film award

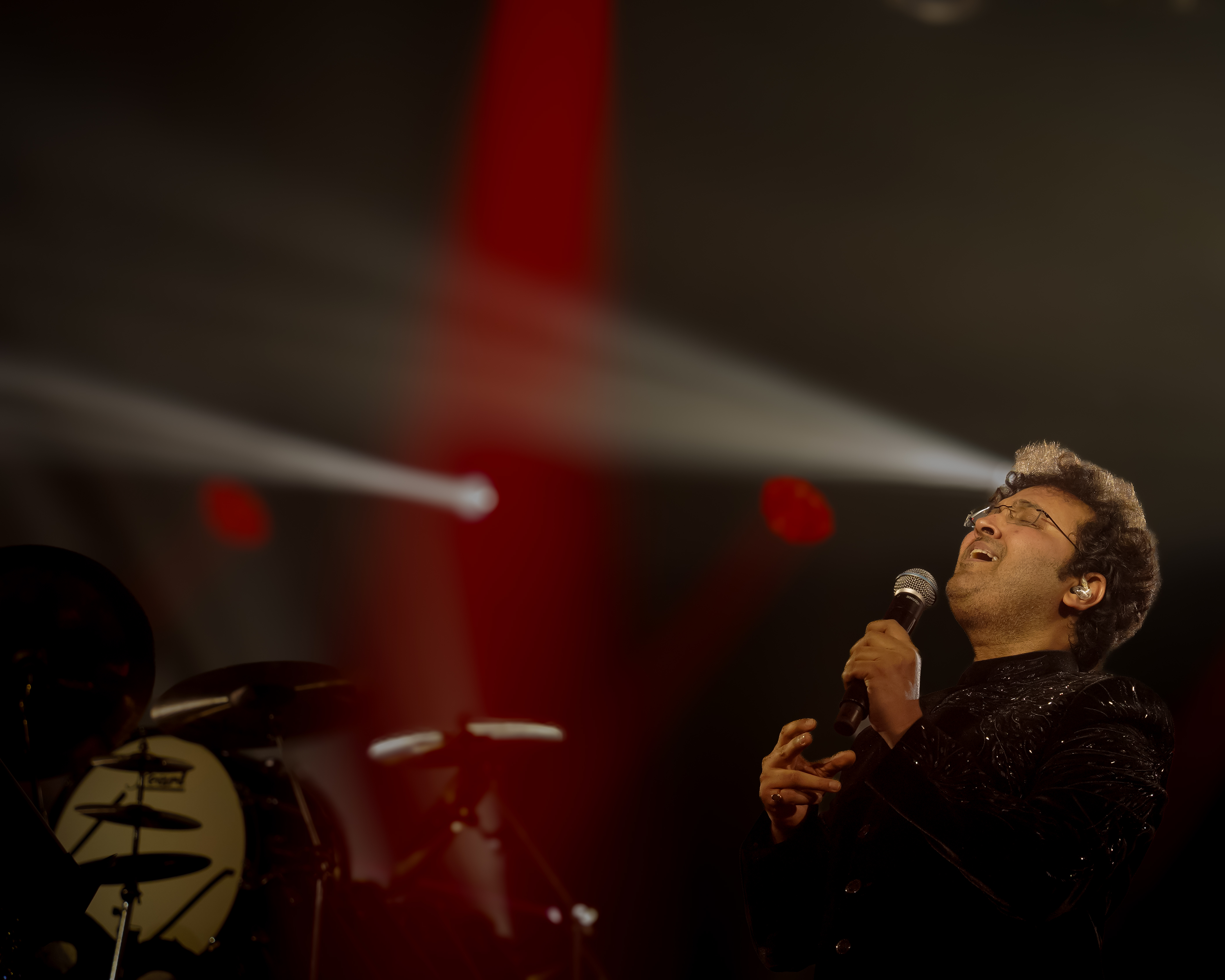
- The 2024 recipient: Sri Krishna
- Awarded for: Best work by a male playback singer in Telugu films
- Country: India
- Presented by: Filmfare
- First award: Mano for "Rukuruku Rukmini" from Pelli (1997)
- Currently held by: Sri Krishna for "Kurchi Madathapetti" from Guntur Kaaram (2024)

Highlights
- Most awards: Karthik (3)
- Most nominations: Anurag Kulkarni and Sid Sriram (7)

The Filmfare Award for Best Male Playback Singer – Telugu is given by the Filmfare magazine as part of its annual Filmfare Awards for Telugu films. It was first given in 1997, at the 45th edition of the awards.

== Winners ==
Year	Singer	Film	Song	Ref.
1997	Mano	Pelli	"Rukuruku Rukmini"
1998	Vandemataram Srinivas	Aahaa	"Priyurali"
2000	Sriram Prabhu	Nuvve Kavali	"Yekkada Unna"
2003	Chakri	Satyam	"O Maguva"
2005	Shankar Mahadevan	Nuvvostanante Nenoddantana	"Chandrullo"
2006	S. P. Balasubrahmanyam	Sri Ramadasu	"Adagadigo Bhadragri"
2007	Karthik	Happy Days	"Arerey Arerey"
2008	Karthik	Kotha Bangaru Lokam	"Nijangaa Nenenaa"
2009	Anuj Gurwara	Magadheera	"Panchadara Bomma"
2010	Ramesh Vinayakam and N. C. Karunya	Khaleja	"Sada Siva Sanyasi"
2011	Rahul Nambiar	Dookudu	"Guruvaram March Okati"
2012	Vaddepalli Srinivas	Gabbar Singh	"Gannulanti Kannulu"
2013	Kailash Kher	Mirchi	"Pandagala Digivacchavu"
2014	Simha	Race Gurram	"Cinema Choopistha Mama"
2015	M. L. R. Karthikeyan	Srimanthudu	"Pora Srimanthuda"
2016	Karthik	A Aa	"Yellipoke Shyamala"
2017	Hemachandra	Fidaa	"Oosupodhu"
2018	Sid Sriram	Geetha Govindam	"Inkem Inkem Kavaale"
2019	AWARDS FUNCTION WAS SUSPENDED DUE TO COVID-19 PANDEMIC
2020 / 21	Sid Sriram	Pushpa: The Rise	"Srivalli"
2022	Kaala Bhairava	RRR	"Komuram Bheemudo"
2023	Sreerama Chandra	Baby	"O Rendu Prema Meghaalila"
2024	Sri Krishna	Guntur Kaaram	"Kurchi Madathapetti"

== Nominations ==
- 2005: Shankar Mahadevan – "Chandrullo Unde" – Nuvvostanante Nenoddantana
  - Karthik – "Pilichina" – Athadu
  - M. M. Keeravani – "Trisha Achata Ichata" – Allari Bullodu
  - Sagar – "Jabilammavo" – Bunny
  - S. P. Balasubrahmanyam – "Ghal Ghal Ghal Ghal" – Nuvvostanante Nenoddantana
  - Tippu – "Something Something" – Nuvvostanante Nenoddantana
- 2006: S. P. Balasubrahmanyam – "Adigo Bhadradri" – Sri Ramadasu
  - Chakri – "Nuvvantene Ishtam" – Devadasu
  - Nihal – "Gala Gala" – Pokiri
  - Siddharth – "Apudo Ipudo" – Bommarillu
- 2008: Karthik – "Nijangaa Nenenaa" – Kotha Bangaru Lokam
  - N. C. Karunya – "Andamaina Kalala" – Baladur
  - Ranjith – "Entavaraku" – Gamyam
  - S. P. Balasubrahmanyam – "Matrudevobhava" – Pandurangadu
  - Saketh – "Nammavemo Ganee" – Parugu
- 2009: Anuj Gurwara – "Panchadara Bomma" – Magadheera
  - Baba Sehgal – "Mr. Perfect" – Arya 2
  - Kailash Kher – "Kammukunna Cheekatlona" – Arundhati
  - S. P. Balasubrahmanyam – "Indiramma" – Mahatma
  - Shankar Mahadevan – "Konchem Ishtam" – Konchem Ishtam Konchem Kashtam
- 2010: Ramesh Vinayakam and N. C. Karunya – "Sada Shiva Sanyasi" – Khaleja
  - Hariharan – "Bangaru Konda" – Simha
  - Karthik – "Nijamena" – Brindaavanam
  - Naresh Iyer – "Nenu Nuvvantu" – Orange
  - Vijay Prakash – "Ee Hrudayam" – Ye Maaya Chesave
- 2011: Rahul Nambiar – "Guruvaram March Okati" – Dookudu
  - Karthik – "Champakamala" – Kandireega
  - Hemachandra – "Oka Vithanam" – Golconda High School
  - Tippu – "Kalaya Nijama" – Sri Rama Rajyam
  - Vijay Prakash – "Niharika" – Oosaravelli
- 2012: Vaddepalli Srinivas – "Gannulanti Kannulunna" – Gabbar Singh
  - Adnan Sami – "O Madhu" – Julayi
  - Deepu – "Nene Nani E" – Eega
  - Karthik – "Yevvaro" – Boduguard
  - S. P. Balasubrahmanyam – "Krishnam Vande Jagadgurum" – Krishnam Vande Jagadgurum
- 2013: Kailash Kher – "Pandagala Digivachavu" – Mirchi
  - Daler Mehndi – "Banthi Poola Janaki" – Baadshah
  - Ranjith – "Jabilli Nuvve Cheppamma" – Ramayya Vasthavayya
  - Shankar Mahadevan – "Bapu Gari Bomma" – Atharintiki Daaredi
  - Suchith Suresan – "Meenakshi Meenakshi" – Masala
- 2014: Simha – "Cinema Choopista" – Race Gurram
  - Arijit Singh – "Kanulanu Thake" – Manam
  - Haricharan – "Saripovu Koti" – Karthikeya
  - Hariharan – "Neelirangu" – Govindudu Andarivadele
  - Hemachandra – "Intakante" – Oohalu Gusagusalade
- 2015: M. L. R. Karthikeyan – "Pora Srimanthuda" – Srimanthudu
  - Dhanunjay Seepana – "Bhaje Bhaje" – Gopala Gopala
  - Keerthi Sagathia – "Neeku Theliyanida" – Kanche
  - Yazin Nizar – "Meghalu Lekunna" – Kumari 21F
  - Yazin Nizar – "Charusheela" – Srimanthudu
- 2016: Karthik – "Yellipoke Shyamala" – A Aa
  - Dhanunjay Seepana – "You Are My MLA" – Sarrainodu
  - N. T. Rama Rao Jr. – "Follow Follow" – Nannaku Prematho
  - Shankar Mahadevan – "Oka Laalana" – Jyo Achyutananda
  - Vijay Prakash – "Thanu Nenu" – Sahasam Swasaga Sagipo
- 2017: Hemachandra – "Oosupodhu" – Fidaa
  - Anurag Kulkarni – "Mellaga Tellarindoi" – Sathamanam Bhavati
  - Armaan Malik – "Hello" – Hello
  - L. V. Revanth – "Teliseney Na Nuvvey" – Arjun Reddy
  - Sid Sriram – "Adiga Adiga" – Ninnu Kori
- 2018: Sid Sriram – "Inkem Inkem Kavaali" – Geetha Govindam
  - Armaan Malik – "Ninnila Ninnila" – Tholi Prema
  - Anurag Kulkarni – "Aasha Paasham" – C/o Kancharapalem
  - Anurag Kulkarni – "Pillaa Raa" – RX 100
  - Kaala Bhairava – "Peniviti" – Aravinda Sametha Veera Raghava
  - Rahul Sipligunj – "Rangaa Rangaa Rangasthalaana" – Rangasthalam
- 2020–2021: Sid Sriram – "Srivalli" – Pushpa: The Rise
  - Anurag Kulkarni – "Ramuloo Ramulaa" – Ala Vaikunthapurramuloo
  - Anurag Kulkarni – "Sirivennala" – Shyam Singha Roy
  - Armaan Malik – "Butta Bomma" – Ala Vaikunthapurramuloo
  - Ram Miriyala – "Chitti" – Jathi Ratnalu
  - Sid Sriram – "Samajavaragamana" – Ala Vaikunthapurramuloo
  - Sid Sriram – "Manasa Manasa" – Most Eligible Bachelor
  - Sid Sriram – "Maguva Maguva" – Vakeel Saab
- 2022: Kaala Bhairava – "Komuram Bheemudo" – RRR
  - Rahul Sipligunj and Kaala Bhairava – "Naatu Naatu" – RRR
  - Ram Miriyala – "Tillu Anna DJ Pedithe" – DJ Tillu
  - Sid Sriram – "Kalaavathi" – Sarkaru Vaari Paata
  - S. P. Charan – "Inthandham" – Sita Ramam
- 2023: Sreerama Chandra – "O Rendu Prema Meghaalila" – Baby
  - Anurag Kulkarni – "Samayama" – Hi Nanna
  - Hesham Abdul Wahab – "Kushi Title Song" – Kushi
  - P V N S Rohit – "Premisthunna" – Baby
  - Ram Miriyala – "Potti Pilla" – Balagam
  - Sid Sriram – "Aradhya" – Kushi
- 2024: Sri Krishna – "Kurchi Madathapetti" – Guntur Kaaram
  - Anirudh Ravichander – "The Fear Song" – Devara: Part 1
  - Anurag Kulkarni – "Suttamla Soosi" – Gangs of Godavari
  - Arijit Singh – "Anuvanuvu" – Om Bheem Bush
  - Gowra Hari – "Poolamme Pilla" – Hanu-Man
  - Ram Miriyala – "Sufiyana" – Aay
  - Sanjith Hegde – "Dum Masala" – Guntur Kaaram

== Superlatives ==
Karthik holds the record of maximum win in this category with three.

Superlative	Singer	Record
Most awards	Karthik	3
Most awards	Sid Sriram	2
Most nominations	Anurag Kulkarni	7
Most nominations	Sid Sriram	7
Most nominations	Karthik	6
Most nominations	S. P. Balasubrahmanyam	5
Most nominations	Ram Miriyala	4
Most nominations	Shankar Mahadevan	4
Most nominations	Armaan Malik	3
Most nominations	Hemachandra	3
Most nominations	Kaala Bhairava	3
Most nominations	Vijay Prakash	3
Most nominations	Arijit Singh	2
Most nominations	Dhanunjay Seepana	2
Most nominations	Hariharan	2
Most nominations	Kailash Kher	2
Most nominations	Rahul Sipligunj	2
Most nominations	Ranjith	2
Most nominations	Tippu	2
Most nominations	Yazin Nizar	2
