= Avunu =

Avunu may refer to:

- Avunu (film), a 2012 Indian Telugu-language film by Ravi Babu
  - Avunu 2, its 2015 sequel also by Babu
- Avunu Valliddaru Ista Paddaru, a 2002 Indian Telugu-language film by Vamsy
