= Sri Krishna (singer) =

Indian playback singer

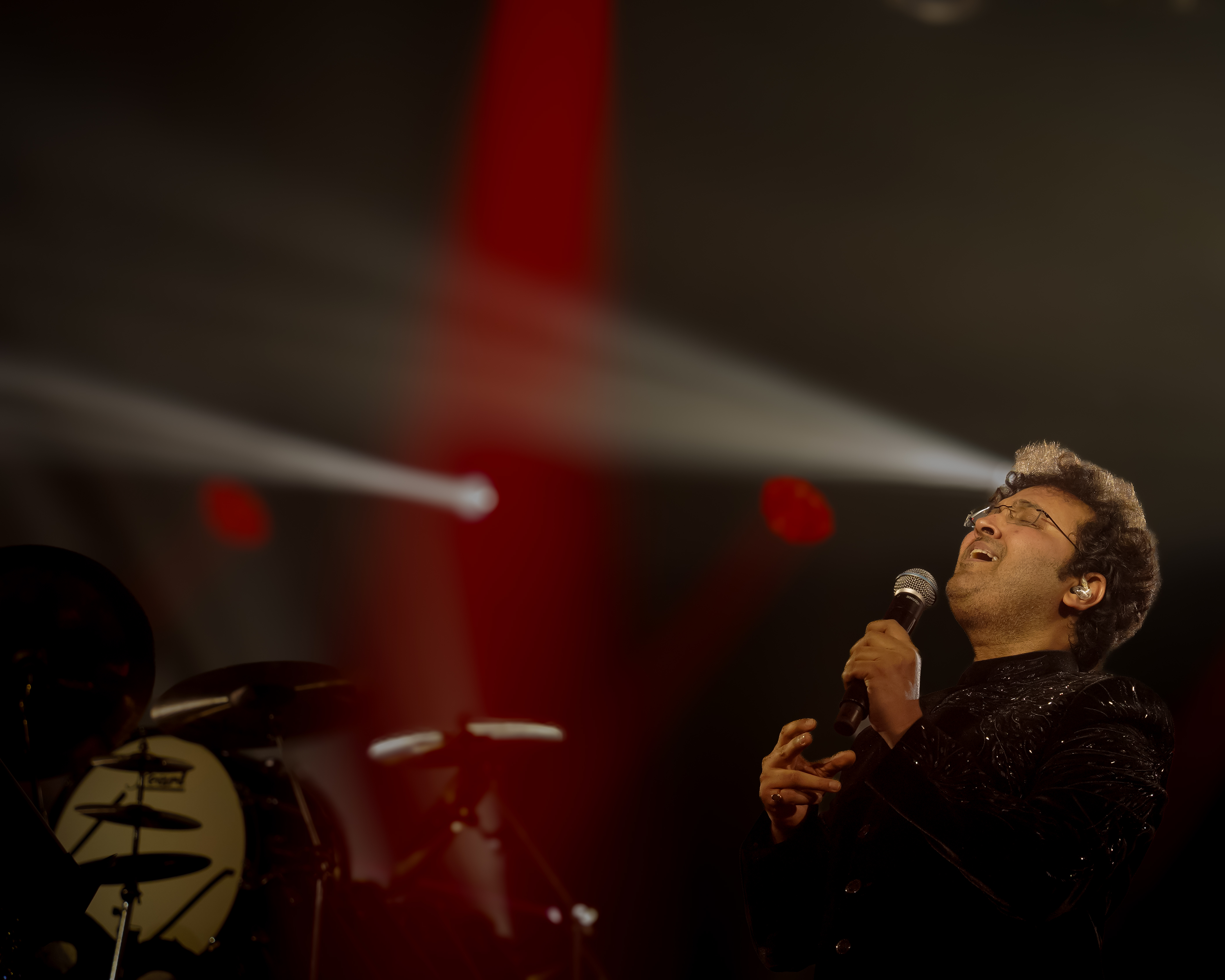
- Sri Krishna in 2024

Background information
- Born: Sri Krishna Hyderabad, Andhra Pradesh, India
- Origin: Vijayawada, Andhra Pradesh, India
- Occupation: Singer
- Instrument: Vocals
- Years active: 2004–present

Sri Krishna Vishnubhotla (born 17 August 1983) is an Indian playback singer, born in Hyderabad and brought up in Vijayawada. He was the winner of the singing competition Paadaalani Vundi hosted by S. P. Balasubrahmanyam on Maa TV. He debuted as playback singer with the film Maa Ilavelpu, released in 2004. He had won the Filmfare Award for Best Male Playback Singer – Telugu for the song "Kurchi Madathapetti" from Guntur Kaaram (2024).

== Early life ==
Sri Krishna started his career as a child anchor in Akashvani, Vijayawada and then participated in various stage shows and singing competitions. He completed his bachelor's degree in P. B. Siddhartha Arts College and post graduation in Sarada college, in Vijayawada. He got recognition with the song "Aadinchi Ashta Chamma" from the film Ashta Chamma and recorded songs for composers like Koti and Mani Sharma.

== Discography ==
=== As singer ===
==== Telugu films ====
Year	Work	Song	Composer	Co-Singer(s)	Ref(s)
2005	Nachav Alludu	Naa Peremo Sri Kanyakumari	Koti		
2006	Gopi Goda Meeda Pilli	Muddhulake	Koti		
2007	Viyyala Vari Kayyalu	Suryude Sare Annade	Ramana Gogula		
2007	Podarillu	Nee Marapey Radhuga	Koti		
2008	Ashta Chamma	Hello Antoo	Kalyani Malik		
2008	Ashta Chamma	Aadinchi Ashta Chamma	Kalyani Malik		
2008	Blade Babji	Pillore Pilla	Koti		
2008	Aalayam	O Prema	Koti		
2008	Aalayam	Anthyakshari	Koti		
2008	Mahanagaramlo	Chandamama	Koti		
2008	Maa Aayana Chanti Pilladu	Modatisari Muddu	M. M. Srilekha		
2009	Arundhati	Chandamama Nuvve Nuvve	Koti		
2009	Target	Tum Ko Dil Diya	Koti		
2010	Don Seenu	Raja Raja Raviteja	Mani Sharma		
2010	Yuganiki Okkadu (dubbed)	Singaarinchana	G. V. Prakash		
2010	Aalasyam Amrutham	Modati Kshanam	Koti		
2010	Aalasyam Amrutham	Daga Daga Daga	Koti		
2010	Aunty Uncle Nandagopal	Idemitamma	Vandemataram Srinivas		
2010	Alalu	Ningilo Tarala(Male)	Sai Karthik		
2011	Golconda High School	Idi Adenemo	Kalyani Malik		
2011	Madata Kaaja	Ninnila Choosthu Unte	Sri Vasanth		
2011	Madata Kaaja	Yama Yamaho	Sri Vasanth		
2011	Jai Bolo Telangana	Oka Puvvu Oka Navvu	Chakri		
2011	Chukkalanti Ammayi Chakkanaina Abbayi	Kallalona Kallu Petti	Anup Rubens		
2011	Parama Veera Chakra	Lokana Chikatini	Mani Sharma		
2011	Brammigaadi Katha	Vellakala Vellakala	Koti		
2011	Kshethram	Jwalaahobila	Koti		
2011	Mugguru	Gundeki	Koti		
2011	Veedu Theda	Marumalle Teega	Chakri		
2011	Gatham	Mabbule Kammina	Vidhya Dharani		
2011	Thirugubothu	Kalla Logillalo	Arjun		
2011	Korameesam	Sirivennela	Top Star Renu		
2011	Korameesam	Koyila Koo	Top Star Renu		
2012	Damarukam	Nesthama Nesthama	Devi Sri Prasad		
2012	Cameraman Gangatho Rambabu	Taladinchuku	Mani Sharma		
2012	Nippu	Dhiya Dhiya	S. Thaman		
2012	Onamaalu	Arudhaina	Koti		
2012	Oka Romantic Crime Katha	Oka Romantic Crime Katha Theme	Praveen Immadi		
2012	Chammak Challo	Chandamamapai Kundelaa	Kiran Varanasi		
2012	Love Cycle	I am Very Sorry	Agastya		
2012	Devasthanam	Snehama	Swara Veena Pani		
2012	Devasthanam	Theliya Ledha	Swara Veena Pani		
2012	Sudigadu	Gajibiji Gathukula	Sri Vasanth		
2012	Yem Babu Laddu Kavala	Challe Ooruko	M. M. Srilekha		
2012	Prematho Cheppana	Prematho Cheppana	Sai Kartheek		
2012	Yamudiki Mogudu	Orori Magadheera	Koti		
2012	Love Attack	Nee Kurulalo	Sri Venkat		
2012	Lottery	Idhi Chinna Cinema	Raghu Ram		
2012	Lottery	Vellake Pranama	Raghu Ram		
2012	Oke Okka Chance	Intikaada Cheppakunda	Ramana Kanoori		
2012	Anarkali	Madini Daagivunna	K. Vidya Pratap		
2012	Memiddaram Preminchukunnam	Memiddaram Preminchukunnam	Samprasan		
2012	Made In Vizag	Kaalame Thanu	Avinash, Vishwajith Dharma Teja		
2012	Made In Vizag	Ramachilakamma (Male)	Avinash, Vishwajith Dharma Teja		
2013	Pavitra	Okkasari Vacchi Po - dhulatirinda	M. M. Srilekha		
2013	Anthaku Mundhu Aa Tharuvatha	Nenena Aa Nenena	Kalyani Koduri		
2013	Gola Seenu	Daggaraina Dhooramena	Dr. Josyabhatla		
2013	Mooga Manasulu	Priyathama Naa	Kesava Kiran		
2013	Mahesh	Yedalo Nenoo	Gopi Sundar		
2013	Kaalicharan	Kurisikurisi	Nandan Raj		
2013	Kaalicharan	Palike Aa Guvva	Nandan Raj		
2013	Adheelekka	Aunty Ji	Chinni Charan		
2013	Gulabi	Sathamanam Bhavati	Pavan Shesha		
2013	Vichakshana	Chelimi Kudire	S. Jagannath		
2013	Amma Nanna Oorelithe	Ori Devudo	Munna Kasi		
2013	Adhbhuta Cine Rangam	Virise Aapoovunadugu	Nagendra Kumar Vepuri		
2013	Adhbhuta Cine Rangam	Toli Chupulona	Nagendra Kumar Vepuri		
2013	Adhbhuta Cine Rangam	Raatri Kalalo Vacchinavu	Nagendra Kumar Vepuri		
2013	Adhbhuta Cine Rangam	Mandara Malavo 1	Nagendra Kumar Vepuri		
2013	Adhbhuta Cine Rangam	Mandara Malavo 2	Nagendra Kumar Vepuri		
2013	Adhbhuta Cine Rangam	Megham Nedu Karigindi	Nagendra Kumar Vepuri		
2013	Drama	Chamak Chama Maaya	Veeru K		
2013	Siva Keshav	Gaaranga Bharanga	Sri Vasanth		
2013	Laila Majnu	Naamadi Nenu	M. M. Srilekha		
2013	My Heart Is Beating	Kalaalu Aagyla O	Michael Makkal		
2013	Athadu Aame O Scooter	Idhi Banda Na Bondha	Chinni Krishna.G		
2013	B4 Marriage	Chinikula Raale	Kanishka		
2013	Original	Udhesala Sandhasalu	Srikoti		
2013	Oka Hindu Oka Muslim	Raghupathi Raghava (Male)	Gitta Naveen Kumar		
2013	Telangana Godavary	Allo Neradallo	Yasho Krishna		
2013	Youth Style	Choodalenide Vidhiraata	T. Srivas		
2014	Laddu Babu	Siri Malli Siri Malli	Chakri		
2014	Geethanjali	Coffee Song	Praveen Lakkaraju		
2014	Prema Geema Jantanai	Manasanta Neediga	Mani Sharma		
2014	Rabhasa	Garam Garam Chilaka	S. Thaman		
2014	Chitram Cheppina Katha	Vachche Vaasanthale	Munna Kasi		
2014	Lakshmi Raave Maa Intiki	Manasulo Vunna Prema	K. M. Radha Krishnan		
2014	Ninu Chusaka	Nenena	Chinni Krishna		
2014	Premisthe Poyekaalam	Kaalama Kaalama	Karthik Kodakandla		
2014	Nenu Naa Friends	Break Up	Chinni Charan		
2014	Real Star	Matallo Cheppalenanthaga	Vandemataram Srinivas		
2014	Pawanism	Chinukai	Kanishka		
2014	Ori Devudoy	Jamjakka Jamjakka	Koti		
2014	Chase	Telusa Manasa Idi	Shankar Tamiri		
2014	Teeyani Kalavo	Kalanuvve	Ravindra Prasad		
2014	Teeyani Kalavo	Nee Preme Oopirigaa	Ravindra Prasad		
2014	Adera Premante	Idivarakerugani	Thavva Vijay Prakash		
2014	Kottha Prema	Sirimuvvala	Raja		
2014	Aanandini	Punnami Olikinda	Bandi Sathyam		
2014	Nagamani	Nachhavule	Sps Vasu		
2014	Just Business	Ye Janmado	Ajay Patnayak		
2014	Aditya	Chey Chey	Bandaru Daanayya Kavi		
2015	Singham 123	Edola Mayala	Seshu		
2015	Yes	Neetho Adugu	Indraganti		
2015	Love Melody	Yadalo Alajadi Repi	P.V.R. Raja		
2015	21st Century Love	Edemouthunna	Kanishka		
2015	365 Days	Aa Devudu Puttinchadu	Nag Srivatsav		
2015	Aame Yevaru	Nakosam Puttina	Chinni Charan		
2015	Red Mirchi	Metthani Chelli	Jassie Gift		
2015	Parvathi Puram	Vanitha Nava Kavitha	Shayak Parvez		
2015	Neti Vijethalu	Oo Sogasa	Karunakar C.H		
2016	Gentleman	Gusa Gusa Lade (Version 2)	Mani Sharma		
2016	Okka Ammayi Thappa	Druvam Druvam	Mickey J. Meyer		
2016	Sarrainodu	Blockbuster	S. Thaman		
2016	Dictator	Chura Chura	S. Thaman		
2016	Dictator	Dictator	S. Thaman		
2016	Chuttalabbayi	Pee Pee Dum Dum	S. Thaman		
2016	Chuttalabbayi	Dhum Dhum	S. Thaman		
2016	Thulasee Dalam	Inthintha Doorana	R. P. Patnaik		
2016	Thulasee Dalam	Nuvveley Nuvveley	R. P. Patnaik		
2016	Enjoy	Naa Manasuna	Taraka Ramarao		
2016	Digbandhana	Rendu Rendu	Ram Sudhanvi		
2016	Operation Kidnap	Neelo Nenani	L. M. Prem		
2017	Student Power	Premante Yento Telusa	Praveen		
2017	Jawan	Intiki Okkadu Kavale	S. Thaman		
2017	Jawan	Bugganchuna	S. Thaman		
2017	Sarovaram	Ala Ala Nuvvu	Sunil Kashyap		
2017	Mama O Chandamama	Srirasthu Kotta Janta	Munna Kasi		
2017	Aakatayi	Anaghaa Anaghaa (Sri Krishna)	Mani Sharma		
2017	Fashion Designer s/o Ladies Tailor	Paapi Kondallo	Mani Sharma		
2017	Fashion Designer s/o Ladies Tailor	Ravi Varma Chitrama	Mani Sharma		
2017	Jayadev	Ne Raja	Mani Sharma		
2017	Winner	Bhajarangabali	S. Thaman		
2017	Sivalinga	Chinna Kabali	S. Thaman		
2017	Sivalinga	Nallanivade	S. Thaman		
2017	Sivalinga	Sivalinga	S. Thaman		
2017	Sivalinga	Saarah Saarah	S. Thaman		
2017	Goutham Nanda	Bole Ram Bole Ram	S. Thaman		
2017	Gajendrudu	Paccha Pacchani	Yuvan Shankar Raja		
2017	Naku Nene Thopu Thurumu	Manmadha O Manmada	Prem L.M.		
2017	Soda Goli Soda	Maa Kallallo	Bharath Madhusudhanan		
2017	Tholiparichayam	Emo Em Maya Chesavo	Indraganti		
2017	Box	Vethukuthunna	Nagavamsi		
2017	Venkatapuram	Kokkoroko	Achu		
2017	Kadile Bommala Katha	Nee Kalla Saigale	Naresh Ravula		
2017	Dongodochadu	Oohalo	Vidyasagar	Anjana Sowmya	
2018	Savyasachi	Oopiri Ukkiribikkiri	M. M. Keeravani		
2018	Amar Akbar Antony	Don Bosco	S. Thaman		
2018	Amar Akbar Antony	Guppeta	S. Thaman		
2018	Rajugadu	Rendu Kallaninda	Gopi Sundar		
2018	Prema Janta	Premante Sapamani	Nikhilesh Thogari		
2018	Devadas	Laka Laka Lakumikara	Mani Sharma		
2018	24 Kisses	Sorry Sorry	Joi Barua		
2018	Nela Ticket	Love You Love You	Shakthikanth Karthick		
2018	Sketch	Cheeni Chillaye	S. Thaman		
2018	Sketch	Sketch - Theme	S. Thaman		
2018	Inttelligent	Let's Do	S. Thaman		
2018	Aachari America Yatra	Swamy Ra Ra	S. Thaman		
2018	Aachari America Yatra	Aachari America Yatra	S. Thaman		
2018	Gang	Ekkadikelle Daaridhi	Anirudh Ravichander		
2018	Bangari Balaraju	Andhamaina Premaraa	Chinni Krishna-Chittibabu Reddypogu		
2018	Party	Hey Gajagaamini	Premgi Amaran		
2018	CoCo Kokila	Endukila Jariginado	Anirudh Ravichander		
2018	Kavacham	Vasthava Pillaa	S. Thaman		
2018	Ninne Cheralani	Kalega Anukunte	Vijjapurapu Kalyani		
2018	Ninne Cheralani	Madi Telipinadi Korika	Vijjapurapu Kalyani		
2019	Prati Roju Pandage	Title Song	S. Thaman		
2019	K.G.F: Chapter 1 (dubbed)	Salam Rocky Bhai	Ravi Basrur		
2019	K.G.F: Chapter 1 (dubbed)	Evvadikevvadu Banisa	Ravi Basrur		
2019	K.G.F: Chapter 1 (dubbed)	Adigo Penu Nishabdham	Ravi Basrur		
2019	Mallesham	Naaku Nuvvani	Mark K. Robin		
2019	Mallesham	Kotha Kotha Ga	Mark K. Robin		
2019	Mallesham	Amma Deevena	Mark K. Robin		
2019	Voter	Shivam Theme	S. Thaman	Aditya Iyengar, Raghuram	
2019	Nuvvu Thopu Raa	Emayyavu Nanna	Suresh Bobbili		
2019	Ee Manase	Naalo Undi Neevenani	Subhash Anand		
2019	Ee Manase	Ye Kya Huva	Subhash Anand		
2019	Venky Mama	Venky Mama	S. Thaman		
2019	Swami Vivekananda	Balame Jevanam	Suresh Bujji		
2019	Swami Vivekananda	Sri Gurudeva	Suresh Bujji		
2019	Missed Call	Merisave	Sabu Varghese		
2019	B Tech Babulu	Emo Emo	Ajay Patnaik		
2019	Bhagyanagara Veedullo Gammathu	Hip Hop	Saketh Komanduri		
2019	Ice Ice	Jaaji Moggalla	Murali Leon		
2019	Ninu Veedani Needanu Nene	Amma Song	S. Thaman		
2019	Evadu Thakkuva Kaadu	Meeko Thoduntu Ledhu	Hari Gowra		
2019	Pahalwan	Prema Kaalam	Arjun Janya		
2020	Ala Vaikunthapurramuloo	Ala Vaikunthapurramuloo	S. Thaman	Priya Sisters	
2020	Local Boy	Sathamanam Antu	Vivek-Mervin	Sameera Bharadwaj	
2020	World Famous Lover	My Love	Gopi Sundar	Ramya Behara	
2020	Miss India	Naa Chinni Lokkammea	S. Thaman	Aditi Bhavaraju, Ramya Behara	
2020	Vikram Rathode	Yedanu Veenaga	Ilaiyaraaja	Srinisha	
2020	Vikram Rathode	Moothi Meeda Meesamunna	Ilaiyaraaja	Haripriya	
2020	Street Dancer 3D	Cocktail	Garry Sandhu, Tanishk Bagchi	Bhargavi Pillai	
2020	Valliddari Madhya	Okapari Okapari Vayyaramai	Madhu Sravanthi	Madhu Sravanthi	
2021	Krack	The Theme Of Katari	S. Thaman	Saicharan Bhaskaruni	
2021	Zombie Reddy	Go Corona	Mark K. Robin	MaMa Sing, Anudeep Dev, Mark K Robin, PVNS Rohit, Hymath, Harika Narayan, Sahithi Chagunti, Sony Komanduri	
2021	Gaali Sampath	Fififee Fifeefee	Achu	Rahul Nambiar, Rajendra Prasad	
2021	Tuck Jagadish	Kolo Kolanna Kolo	S. Thaman	Armaan Malik, Harini Ivaturi	
2021	Vakeel Saab	Kadhulu Kadhulu	S. Thaman	Hemachandra Vedala	
2021	Roberrt	Brother from Another Mother	Arjun Janya	Hemachandra Vedala	
2021	Narappa	Raa Narakara	Mani Sharma	Revanth, Saicharan Bhaskaruni	
2021	Varudu Kaavalenu	Vaddaanam	Vishal Chandrashekhar	Geetha Madhuri, ML Gayathri, Aditi Bhavaraju, Sruthi Ranjani	
2021	Vikram (True Love Injurious To Life)	Kalaya Nizama	Suresh Prasad	Pranavi	
2021	Minnal Murali	Velithe	Shaan Rahman	M. M. Srilekha	
2021	Anukoni Athidhi	Laali Laali Jo	P S Jayhari		
2022	Bheemla Nayak	Adavi Gusagusalu	S. Thaman	Manisha Eerabathini	
2022	Bheemla Nayak	Bheemla Nayak Title Song	S. Thaman	Prithvi Chandhra, Ram Miriyala	
2022	Ghani	Ghani Anthem	S. Thaman	Aditya Iyengar, Prudhvi Chandra, Saicharan Bhaskaruni	
2022	KGF: Chapter 2 (dubbed)	Toofan	Ravi Basrur	Arun Kaundinya, Harini Ivaturi, Mohan Krishna, Prudhvi Chandra, Puneeth Rudranag, Ravi Basrur, Sachin Basrur, Saicharan Bhaskaruni, Santhosh Venky	
2022	KGF: Chapter 2 (dubbed)	Sulthana	Ravi Basrur	Arun Kaundinya, Harini Ivaturi, Manish Dinakar, Mohan Krishna, Prudhvi Chandra, Puneeth Rudranag, Ravi Basrur, Sachin Basrur, Saicharan Bhaskaruni, Santhosh Venky	
2022	Sarkaru Vaari Paata	Ma Ma Mahesha	S. Thaman	Jonita Gandhi	
2022	Sarkaru Vaari Paata	Murari Vaa	S. Thaman	ML Gayatri, Sruthi Ranjani	
2022	Saidulu	Seethalu	NS Prasu	Tushara Nilaya	
2022	Thank You	E Nimisham	S. Thaman	Manisha Eerabathini	
2022	Wanted Pandugod	Abba Abba	Peddapalli Rohith (PR)	Harika Narayan	
2022	Nenu Meeku Baaga Kavalsinavaadini	Manase (Family Song)	Mani Sharma	Ramya Behara	
2022	Godfather	Najabhaja	S. Thaman	Prudhvi Chandra	
2022	Urvasivo Rakshasivo	Seethakoka Chiluka	Achu		
2022	Kantara	Karme Rayiga	B. Ajaneesh Loknath		
2022	Cheppalani Undi	Le Raa	Aslam Keyi	Aslam Keyi	
2022	Sasanasabha	Padara Padara	Ravi Basrur	Saketh Komanduri	
2022	Valliddari Madhya	Okapari Okapari Vayyaramai	Madhu Sravanthi	Madhu Sravanthi	
2022	Laatti	Karthavyannoka Vasthram La	Yuvan Shankar Raja	Saicharan Bhaskaruni	
2023	Organic Mama Hybrid Alludu	Allasani	S. V. Krishna Reddy	Harini	
2023	Geeta Sakshigaa	Adugulo Adugunai	Gopi Sundar	Amrutha Suresh	
2023	Suryapet Junction	Oka Pranam	Roshan Salur		
2023	Ramabanam	Monalisa Monalisa	Mickey J. Meyer	Geetha Madhuri	
2023	Nagumomu Chalule	Navvulo	Vinod Gonti		
2023	Katha Venuka Katha	Ninnu Choosi Choodanga	Shravan Bharadwaj	Ramya Behara	
2023	Anni Manchi Sakunamule	Sita Kalyanam	Mickey J. Meyer	Chaitra Ambadipudi	
2023	Anni Manchi Sakunamule	Cheyyi Cheyyi Kalipeddam	Mickey J. Meyer	Chaitra Ambadipudi, Saandip, Venu Srirangam	
2023	Arangetram - The Origin	Voohallona Dagunna	Gideon Katta		
2023	Bhalare Sitram	Roju Chustu Ninne	Samy Kattupalli		
2023	Rudrangi	Chudaka Chudaka	Nawfal Raja Ais	Ramya Behara	
2023	Baby	Riba Pappa	Vijai Bulganin		
2023	Slum Dog Husband	Mera Chota Dil	Bheems Ceciroleo	Kumara Vagdevi	
2023	Leo (dubbed)	Badass	Anirudh Ravichander	Saicharan Bhaskaruni	
2023	Breathe	Nelakannaa Mundhe	Mark K. Robin		
2024	Guntur Kaaram	Kurchi Madathapetti	S. Thaman	Mahesh Babu, Sahithi Chaganti	
2024	Guntur Kaaram	Mawaa Enthaina	S. Thaman	Rahul Sipligunj, Komanduri Ramachari	
2024	Eagle	Garudam	Davzand		
2024	Vey Dharuvey	Brother Sister	Bheems Ceciroleo		
2024	Bharateeyudu 2	Come Back Indian	Anirudh Ravichander		
2024	Aho Vikramaarka	Archana	Ravi Basrur		
2024	Pranaya Godari	Kalalo Kalalo	Markandeya Paramalla		
2024	Laggam	Laga Laaga Laggam	Charan Arjun	Chinmayi, Shreenika Mahathi	
2024	Dhoom Dhaam	Tomato Buggala Pilla	Gopi Sundar	Geetha Madhuri	
2024	Dhoom Dhaam	Kundanala Bomma	Gopi Sundar		
2025	Sankranthiki Vasthunam	"Guruvarya"	Bheems Ceciroleo		
2025	Kanya Kumari	"Kalala Kurisina"	Ravi Nidamarthy	Jayasri Pallem	
2025	Dhandoraa	"Parichayam Avakunda"	Mark K Robin	Harini Ivaturi	
2025	They Call Him OG	"Hungry Cheetah"	S. Thaman	Prudhvi Chandra, Arun Kaundinya, Ritesh G Rao, Sai Charan, Saketh Komanduri, Adviteeya Vojjala, Raghuram, Pratyusha, Pranathi, Nada Priya, Lakshmi Meghana, Sahiti Chaganti, Ramya Behera, Harini Ivaturi, Satya Yamini & Maneesha	
2026	Vishnu Vinyasam	"Dekho Vishnu Vinyasam"	Radhan		

==== Kannada films ====
Year	Work	Song	Composer	Ref(s)
2010	Gandede	Andu Kolladene Happy	Chakri	
2014	Prethi Madu Tapeenilla	Nanna Inchinchu	R. P. Patnaik	
2018	Omme Nishyabda Omme Yuddha	Malagu Malagu	Kiran Varanasi	
2021	Master	Quit Maad Maga	Anirudh Ravichander	
2021	Haage Vaikunthapuradalli	Haage Vaikunthapuradalli	S. Thaman	
2022	Raajahyoga	Virahada Praya	Arun Muraleedharan	
2023	Leo	Badass	Anirudh Ravichander	Kannada (D)

==== Tamil films ====
Year	Work	Song	Composer	Ref(s)
2014	Inji Murappa	Manathile Unnai	Mani Sharma	
2017	Shivalinga	Sivalinga	S. Thaman	
2022	Yuvarathnaa (dubbed)	Neeyagiraen	S. Thaman	
2022	Sasanasabha (dubbed)	Manidha Manidha	Ravi Basrur	

==== Malayalam films ====
Year	Work	Song	Composer	Ref(s)
2020	Angu Vaikuntapurathu (dubbed)	"Kutti Bomma"	S. Thaman	
2022	Beast (dubbed)	"Jolly O Gymkhana"	Anirudh	
2023	Leo (dubbed)	Badass	Anirudh Ravichander	

==== Hindi films ====
Year	Work	Song	Composer	Co-Singer(s)	Ref(s)
2022	Godfather (dubbed)	"Godfather - Title Song"	S. Thaman	Anudeep Dev, Aditya Iyengar, Raghuram, Saicharan Bhaskaruni, Arjun Vijay, Ritesh G Rao, Chaitu Satsangi, Bharat, Arun Kaundinya, Adviteeya, Sruthika, Pranathi, Pratyusha Pallapothu, Rachita, Vaishnavi, Harika Narayan, Sruthi Ranjani, Sahiti Chaganti	
2023	Salaar: Part 1 – Ceasefire (dubbed)	Yaara	Ravi Basrur		
2024	Hindustani 2 (dubbed)	Come Back Indian	Anirudh Ravichander		
2024	Singham Again	Jai Bajrangbali	Thaman S	Adviteeya Vojjala, Aishwarya Daruri, Arun Kaundinya, Chaitu Satsangi, Kareemullah, Lakshmi Meghana, Lakshmi Naidu, Maneesha Pandranki, Nadapriya, Pranati, Prudhvi Chandra, Ritesh G Rao, Saatvik, Sahithi Chaganti, Shruthika, Sri Sai Charan, Sruthi Ranjani, Sudhanshu, Vagdevi	
2025	They Call Him OG (dubbed)	"Hungry Cheetah"	S. Thaman	Prudhvi Chandra, Arun Kaundinya, Ritesh G Rao, Sai Charan, Saketh Komanduri, Adviteeya Vojjala, Raghuram, Pratyusha, Pranathi, Nada Priya, Lakshmi Meghana, Sahiti Chaganti, Ramya Behera, Harini Ivaturi, Satya Yamini & Maneesha	

=== Other songs ===
Year	Work	Song	Composer	Notes
2023	Nijam With Smita	"Episode 5 Closing Song"	Saketh Komanduri	Television talk show
