= Brother of Bommali =

- Theatrical release poster
- Directed by: B Chinni Krishna
- Produced by: Ammiraju Kanumilli
- Starring: Allari Naresh; Monal Gajjar; Karthika
- Cinematography: Vijay Kumar
- Edited by: Gowtham Raju
- Music by: Shekar Chandra
- Production company: Siri Cinema
- Release date: 7 November 2014
- Running time: 143 Minutes
- Country: India
- Language: Telugu

Brother of Bommali is a 2014 Indian Telugu-language comedy film directed by B Chinni Krishna, produced by Ammiraju Kanumilli under Siri Cinema and starring Allari Naresh, Monal Gajjar, and Karthika Nair in the lead roles. The film soundtrack was composed by Shekar Chandra and the cinematographer was Adusumilli Vijay Kumar. Brother of Bommali was released on 7 November 2014. It was declared 'Super-Hit' at the box office. Karthika Nair's performance received high critical acclaim and received her first ever Filmfare Awards South nomination. It had also marked the final Telugu movie till date of Karthika's acting career (who's basically the daughter of legendary actress of the 80s era, Tamil and Telugu actress, Radha Nair

== Plot ==
On a rainy night, the twins are born in a local government hospital. The older twin is a boy, Ramakrishna 'Ramky' (Allari Naresh) and the younger twin is a girl, Lakshmi 'Lucky' (Karthika Nair). Ramky is calm, seeking stability and focus while his sister Lucky is a streetwise tomboy who has grown up learning karate.

The children grow up with Ramakrishna becoming an interior designer; content with a safe career and the approval of his family. Lakshmi grows up into a wild and headstrong young woman.

Ramky falls in love with Shruthi (Monal Gajjar); another interior designer who works for a rival business. Shruti ends up working in Ramky's firm and after a series of incidents, returns his love, but his father declares he can only marry if he finds a husband for his sister first.

Lucky confesses that she is in love with Harsha (Harshvardhan Rane) and stubbornly insists that he is the only man she will ever marry. From that point on, the entire cast starts doing everything possible to get Lucky married to Harsha.

== Cast ==
- Allari Naresh as Ramakrishna / Ramky
- Monal Gajjar as Shruti
- Karthika Nair as Mahalakshmi / Lucky (Bommali)
- Harshvardhan Rane as Harshavardhan "Harsha"
- Brahmanandam as Kona Venkat
- Ali as Pickpocket Neelam
- Vennela Kishore as Sandeep/Sandy
- Vineet Kumar as Shankar Bhupal
- Kelly Dorji as farmer, Previously as Malaysian NRI
- Srinivasa Reddy as himself
- Sudigali Sudheer as himself
- Madhunandan as himself
- Jaya Prakash Reddy as Boss for Ramki, Sandeep's Father
- Nagineedu as Surya Pratap
- Praveen as himself
- Abhimanyu Singh as Veerendra Bhupal (S/O Shankar Bhupal)

== Soundtrack ==
This film has five songs composed by Shekar Chandra with lyrics written by Sri Mani and Bhaskarabhatla. The audio launch was held in Hyderabad on 4 October 2014 through Shreyas Music.

Brother of Bommali

Soundtrack album by Shekar Chandra
- Released: 4 October 2014
- Recorded: 2014
- Genre: Feature film soundtrack
- Length: 16:53
- Language: Telugu
- Label: Shreyas Music
- Producer: Shekar Chandra

Shekar Chandra chronology
Karthikeya (2014)	Brother of Bommali (2014)	Avunu 2 (2014)

Tracklist
No.	Title	Length
1.	"Boom Boom"	3:30
2.	"Jeans Vesukunna"	3:27
3.	"I Love You Ante"	4:01
4.	"Ponytail Pori"	2:06
5.	"Tu Hi Mera"	3:49
Total length:		16:53

== Reception ==
=== Critical reception ===
The film received mixed reviews from critics. Ch Sushil Rao of The Times of India gave it 2.5/5 and stated that "If you can enjoy the ridiculous, you will enjoy this. As far as performances are concerned, Naresh delivers quite well and Karthika's fights and dance are impressive. If you ignore some scenes that create confusion, it's an entertaining movie".
