= Harshvardhan Rane =

Indian actor (born 1983)

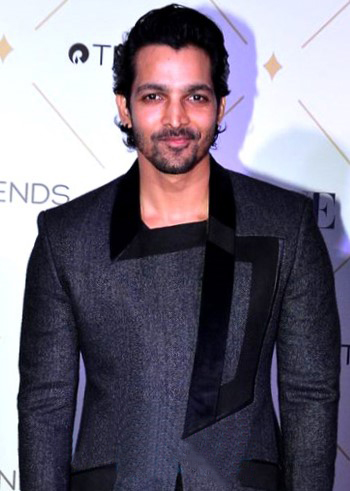
- Rane in 2017
- Born: 16 December 1983 (age 42); Rajamahendravaram, Andhra Pradesh, India
- Occupation: Actor
- Years active: 2007–present

Harshvardhan Rane (born 16 December 1983) is an Indian actor, who primarily works in Hindi and Telugu films. Rane made his screen debut with the Telugu film Thakita Thakita (2010), and made his Hindi film debut with Sanam Teri Kasam (2016), for which he received the Stardust Award for Superstar of Tomorrow – Male nomination.

Rane started his career with a small stint on television, in Left Right Left (2007–2008). He then appeared in successful Telugu films including Naa Ishtam (2012), Avunu (2012), Prema Ishq Kaadhal (2013), Anaamika (2014). After venturing into Hindi films, Rane has received praise for his portrayal of a gangster in Taish (2020), an adventure lover in Haseen Dillruba (2021) and a politician in the sleeper hit Ek Deewane Ki Deewaniyat (2025).

== Early life ==
Rane was born on 16 December 1983 in Rajamahendravaram, Andhra State, India, to a Telugu mother and a Marathi father. His father, Vivek Rane, was a doctor in his hometown of Gwalior, Madhya Pradesh. Rane grew up in Gwalior and moved to Delhi at the age of 16 before eventually settling in Mumbai, Maharashtra.

== Career ==
=== Debut and early work (2007-2015) ===
Rane made his acting debut with the Hindi television series, Left Right Left in 2007. He portrayed Cadet Rummy Gaur in the second season of the show. Rane made his film debut with the Telugu film Thakita Thakita in 2010. He portrayed a college student opposite Haripriya. Rediff.com mentioned, "Harsh is apt for his role; He displays the earnestness and sincerity needed for the role."

He had two films in 2012. He first appeared in Naa Ishtam opposite Genelia D'Souza. He then portrayed the lead opposite Poorna in Avunu. Radhika Rajamani noted, "Avunu works because of the acting of Poorna and Harsha. Harsha shows his brilliance towards the end." He portrayed a musician opposite Vithika Sheru in Prema Ishq Kaadhal in 2013. Karthik Pasupulate of Times of India wrote, "Harshvardhan Rane looks every bit the brooding rock star."

Rane had four releases in 2014. He first portrayed a software engineer in Anaamika opposite Nayanthara. He then portrayed a fashion designer in Maaya opposite Avantika Mishra. A critic of 123telugu stated, "Harshavardhan Rane who usually does different kind of roles, has given a matured performance in this film." Next he portrayed a software engineer opposite Anjali in Geethanjali. Rane then had a cameo role in Brother of Bommali. In 2015, Rane first reprised his role of Harsha in the sequel of Avunu titled, Avunu 2, and then played a cameo in Bengal Tiger.

=== Sanam Teri Kasam and career progression (2016-2023) ===
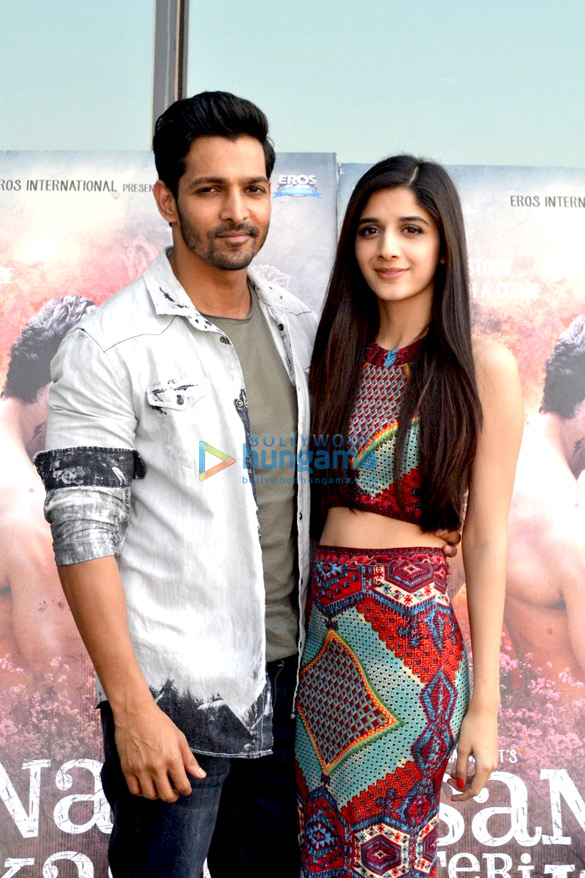
Rane and Hocane at Sanam Teri Kasam's promotions

Rane made his Hindi film debut with the 2016 film, Sanam Teri Kasam. He portrayed a lawyer and ex-convict opposite Pakistani actress Mawra Hocane. A Hindustan Times's critic noted: "Rane as Inder, delivers a controlled and poised performance. He lights up the screen with his strong and well-chiselled physique and emotes superbly through his eyes." Kriti Tulsiani of News18 mentioned him as "one of the most incredible performer." He received Stardust Award for Superstar of Tomorrow – Male nomination for the film. In 2017, he did a cameo in Fidaa opposite Sai Pallavi.

Rane had two films in 2018. He first portrayed Maj. Harbhajan Singh in J P Dutta's Paltan, opposite Monica Gill. Raja Sen from Hindustan Times said, "Harshvardhan Rane commit fully to his part with noses-flaring and eyebrows furrowing the brow." He then portrayed a kidnapper in Kavacham. The critic from Deccan Chronicle stated that Rane "justifies his cameo."

In 2020, he portrayed a gangster opposite Sanjeeda Sheikh in Taish. It released as a feature film and a six episodic series. A reviewer of Bollywood Hungama noted, "Rane looks dashing and gives a first-rate performance." Pallabi Dey Purkayastha of Times of India said, "Rane, as ruthless gangster Pali, is impactful with the exception of his confrontational scene with Samrat."

Rane portrayed an adventure lover opposite Taapsee Pannu in Haseen Dillruba, a Netflix release. Anna MM Vetticad stated, "Rane plays the only attention-grabbing character and delivers the film’s only memorable performance." He had only one release in 2022. He portrayed an advocate in Tara Vs Bilal opposite Sonia Rathee.

=== Career expansion (2024-present) ===
Post a year hiatus, Rane played a medical student opposite T. J. Bhanu in Dange, his first release of 2024. Devesh Sharma of Filmfare noted: "Harshvardhan is cast in the mould of the big-hearted college senior and does justice to his role. His body language and expressions suit his character’s persona." In his next film of the year, Rane played a man convicted in a murder, opposite Divya Khosla Kumar in Savi. Titas Chowdhury of News18 stated, "Harshvardhan plays Savi’s husband and while he has a limited screen time, he makes sure that you take note of him." Later the year, Rane played a local Football player in The Miranda Brothers, alongside Meezaan Jafri and Jeniffer Piccinato. Dhaval Roy found his character to be "one dimensional", offering him limited scope to perform.

In his only film of 2025, Ek Deewane Ki Deewaniyat, Rane played a politician who is in love with an actress, opposite Sonam Bajwa. Rachit Gupta noted, "Harshvardhan's performance and his character deliver an intense pay-off for the viewer." While, Rishabh Suri stated, "Rane tries to elevate a couple of scenes, but never quite convinces." The film emerged a major commercial success, proving to be sleeper hit.

== Personal life ==
Rane is fluent in English, Hindi, Telugu and Marathi. He dated actress Kim Sharma from 2018 to 2019.

== Other work and media image ==
Aakriti Anand of Filmfare finds Rane to be "cool, calm and amicable". Priyanka Roy of The Telegraph found him to be "humble, level-headed, easygoing and honest" and added, "Rane impressed with Sanam Teri Kasam and has grabbed attention with Taish and Haseen Dillruba." Praising the actor, director Bejoy Nambiar said, "Harsh is one of those actors who spoils the director. He is such a delight to work with that anyone who works with him would love to work with him again." In the Times' 50 Most Desirable Men list, Rane ranked 32nd in 2016, 35th in 2017, 33rd in 2018, 31st in 2019 and 29th in 2020. In Hyderabad Times' Most Desirable Men list, he was placed 16th in 2015.

Rane owns a charity foundation holding garage sales for the ShirtOff Foundation to raise money to support the education of a girl-child (Swati) who had lost her parents to HIV. The campaign has him selling T-shirts he wore in his films at charity garage sales. He then sold his shirts in Hyderabad from his latest hit Sanam Teri Kasam and managed to single-handedly raise close to Rs Two lakhs and still counting through online sales.

My fans buy my shirts on sale and pose with me holding placards that read Took my #ShirtOff while some choose to simply contribute. I am also humbled by the support of fans and every contribution no matter how big or small, go a long way in helping Swati.

- Rane talking about this unique initiative.

Rane also endorsed a Sri Lankan Wildlife Sanctuary in 2018. In May 2021, Rane sold his bike to raise oxygen concentrators for those infected by the COVID virus.

== Filmography ==
Key
| † | Denotes films that have not yet been released |

=== Films ===
| Year | Title | Role | Language | Notes | Ref. |
|---|---|---|---|---|---|
| 2010 | Thakita Thakita | Sridhar | Telugu | | |
| 2012 | Naa Ishtam | Kishore | Telugu | | |
| 2012 | Avunu | Harsha | Telugu | | |
| 2012 | Infinity | Dev | Hindi | Short film | |
| 2013 | Prema Ishq Kaadhal | Randhir "Randy" | Telugu | | |
| 2014 | Anaamika | Ajay | Telugu | Bilingual film | |
| 2014 | Nee Enge En Anbe | Ajay | Tamil | Bilingual film | |
| 2014 | Maaya | Siddharth Varma | Telugu | | |
| 2014 | Geethanjali | Madhunandhan | Telugu | | |
| 2014 | Brother of Bommali | Harsha | Telugu | | |
| 2014 | Hello Good Bye | Protagonist | Telugu | Short film | |
| 2015 | Avunu 2 | Harsha | Telugu | | |
| 2015 | Bengal Tiger | Karan | Telugu | Cameo appearance | |
| 2016 | Sanam Teri Kasam | Inder Lal Parihaar | Hindi | | |
| 2016 | Khamakha | Udayan | Hindi | Short film | |
| 2017 | Fidaa | Bhanumathi's neighbour | Telugu | Cameo appearance | |
| 2017 | Excuse Me | "Sir" | Telugu | Short film | |
| 2018 | Paltan | Major Harbhajan Singh | Hindi | | |
| 2018 | Kavacham | Aravindh | Telugu | | |
| 2020 | Taish | Pali Brar | Hindi | | |
| 2021 | Haseen Dillruba | Neel Tripathi | Hindi | | |
| 2022 | Tara vs Bilal | Adv. Bilal "Billu" Khan | Hindi | | |
| 2024 | Dange | Xavier "Zee" | Hindi | Acted only in Hindi version | |
| 2024 | Savi | Nakul Sachdev | Hindi | | |
| 2024 | The Miranda Brothers | Julio Miranda | Hindi | | |
| 2025 | Ek Deewane ki Deewaniyat | Vikramaditya Bhonsle | Hindi | | |
| 2027 | Silaa † | Shekhar Angre | Hindi | Completed | |
| 2027 | Force 3 † | TBA | Hindi | Filming | |
| 2027 | Police Company † | TBA | Hindi | Filming | |

=== Television ===
| Year | Title | Role | Language | Ref. |
|---|---|---|---|---|
| 2007–2008 | Left Right Left | Cadet Rummy Gaur | Hindi | |

== Accolades ==
| Year | Award | Category | Film | Result | Ref. |
|---|---|---|---|---|---|
| 2017 | Stardust Awards | Superstar of Tomorrow – Male | Sanam Teri Kasam | Nominated | |
