= Chattakkari =

Chattakkari may refer to:

- Chattakkari (1974 film), Malayalam film released in 1974 starring Mohan and Lakshni
- Chattakkari (2012 film), Malayalam film released in 2012 starring Hemanth and Shamna Kasim
