= Naa Ishtam =

Nee Ishtam Leda Naa Ishtam
- Film poster
- Directed by: Prakash Tholeti
- Written by: Kona Venkat
- Produced by: Paruchuri Kiriti
- Starring: Rana Daggubati; Genelia D'Souza; Harshvardhan Rane
- Cinematography: Venkat Rama Prasad
- Edited by: Kotagiri Venkateswara Rao
- Music by: Chakri
- Production company: United Movies
- Release date: 23 March 2012
- Country: India
- Language: Telugu

Nee Ishtam Leda Naa Ishtam (transl. Your wish or My wish) is a 2012 Telugu-language romantic action film directed by Prakash Toleti and produced by Paruchuri Kiriti. The film stars Rana Daggubati and Genelia D'Souza in the lead roles. Production began in April 2011 and features music by Chakri. The film was released on 23 March 2012. It is dubbed into Tamil as Kadhanayagan. This film was Genelia's last Telugu film till 2025, before Junior.

== Plot ==
Ganesh (Rana Daggubati) is an extremely selfish person who lives and works in Malaysia. Suddenly, a young woman named Krishnaveni (Genelia D'Souza) enters in his life and everything changes unexpectedly. Ganesh quickly falls in love with her but she loves Kishore (Harshvardhan Rane) and for that she elopes from her home as her father Naidu (Nassar) does not approve of her choice. But Kishore doesn't turn up and she feels cheated. Ganesh's selfish nature gets him to lie to Krishnaveni and he takes her home to Naidu in the hope of making some money.

But Ganesh realizes his mistake once he sees Naidu and his family and brings Krishnaveni back to Malaysia. As a cheated Krishnaveni begins rebuilding her life with Ganesh's support, love blossoms between the two. Into this situation enters Kishore, who is desperate to win back Krishnaveni's love. Meanwhile, Naidu is furious about the whole episode and engages the services of Malaysia Don Salim Bhai (Shawar Ali) to trap Ganesh. Ganesh uses all his guile to thwart Salim Bhai and throw Kishore off the track. Whether he is successful and if Krishnaveni accepts him in the end forms the crux of the story.

== Cast ==
- Rana Daggubati as Ganesh
- Genelia D'Souza as Krishnaveni Naidu
- Harshvardhan Rane as Kishore
- Brahmanandam as Kadiyam Bujji
- Ahuti Prasad as Ganesh's uncle
- Nassar as Naidu, Krishnaveni's father
- Shawar Ali as Salim Bhai
- Ali as Drunkard Balu
- Raghu Babu as Ganga
- Bharath as Dora Babu
- Pragathi as Krishnaveni's mother
- Monisha as Sappu
- Subbaraju as Naidu's henchman
- Sree Vishnu as Ganesh's friend
- Uttej
- Maryam Zakaria in a cameo appearance for the item number, "Jilele Jilele"
- Hamsa Nandini in a cameo appearance for the item number, "Jilele Jilele"

== Soundtrack ==
Nee Ishtam

Soundtrack album to Nee Ishtam by Chakri
- Released: 5 March 2012
- Recorded: 2012
- Genre: Feature film soundtrack
- Length: 29:54
- Language: Telugu
- Label: Venus Music
- Producer: Chakri

Chakri chronology
Jai Bolo Telangana (2011)	Nee Ishtam (2012)	Devaraya (2012)

Music was provided by Chakri and Lyrics were penned by Chandrabose, Balaji & Vanamali. The audio release function was held on 5 March 2012 at Gokaraju Rangaraju Institute of Engineering and Technology, Hyderabad. Released by Victory Venkatesh, the event was attended by the film's main star cast. A Platinum Disc Function was held on 23 March 2012. The music got generally positive reviews. Musicperk.com gave a rating of 7 out of 10 quoting 'Be ready to rock and also swoon in your dreams'. Myfirstshow.com gave a positive review quoting 'Chakri after a long time made a comeback of sorts and listening to music makes one feel that he made a strong impact with the tunes. He is amply aided by creative skills of Chandra Bose, Balaji, and Vanamali. 'Naa Isham' becomes the buzz word for all music lovers and gen-x youth'. Bharatstudent.com also gave a positive review Quoting 'Overall, this is one album whose CD can be bought'.

No.	Title	Lyrics	Singer(s)	Length
1.	"Naa Ishtam"	Chandrabose	Kunal Ganjawala	4:20
2.	"Maa Pedhakka"	Balaji	Geetha Madhuri, Deepthi Chari, Aishwarya	4:54
3.	"Jillele Jillele"	Balaji	Adnan Sami, Mamta Sharma	4:14
4.	"Haayi Haayiga"	Balaji	Revanth	4:35
5.	"Changure Andhaale"	Vanamali	Hema Chandra, Uma Neha S	3:58
6.	"O Saathiya"	Balaji	K.K.	5:39
7.	"Nee Ishtam"	Balaji	Shaan	2:11
Total length:				29:54

== Production ==
The film was launched with shooting beginning in April 2011. The second launch with shooting began on 6 May 2011 The title of the film originally belonged to Jogi Naidu for a film to be made by Clapboard Productions banner with Allari Naresh to be directed by Parusuram. But since the project got delayed he gave it away to Paruchuri Kireeti for this project.
