= Santosh Sethumadhavan =

Indian scriptwriter and creative director

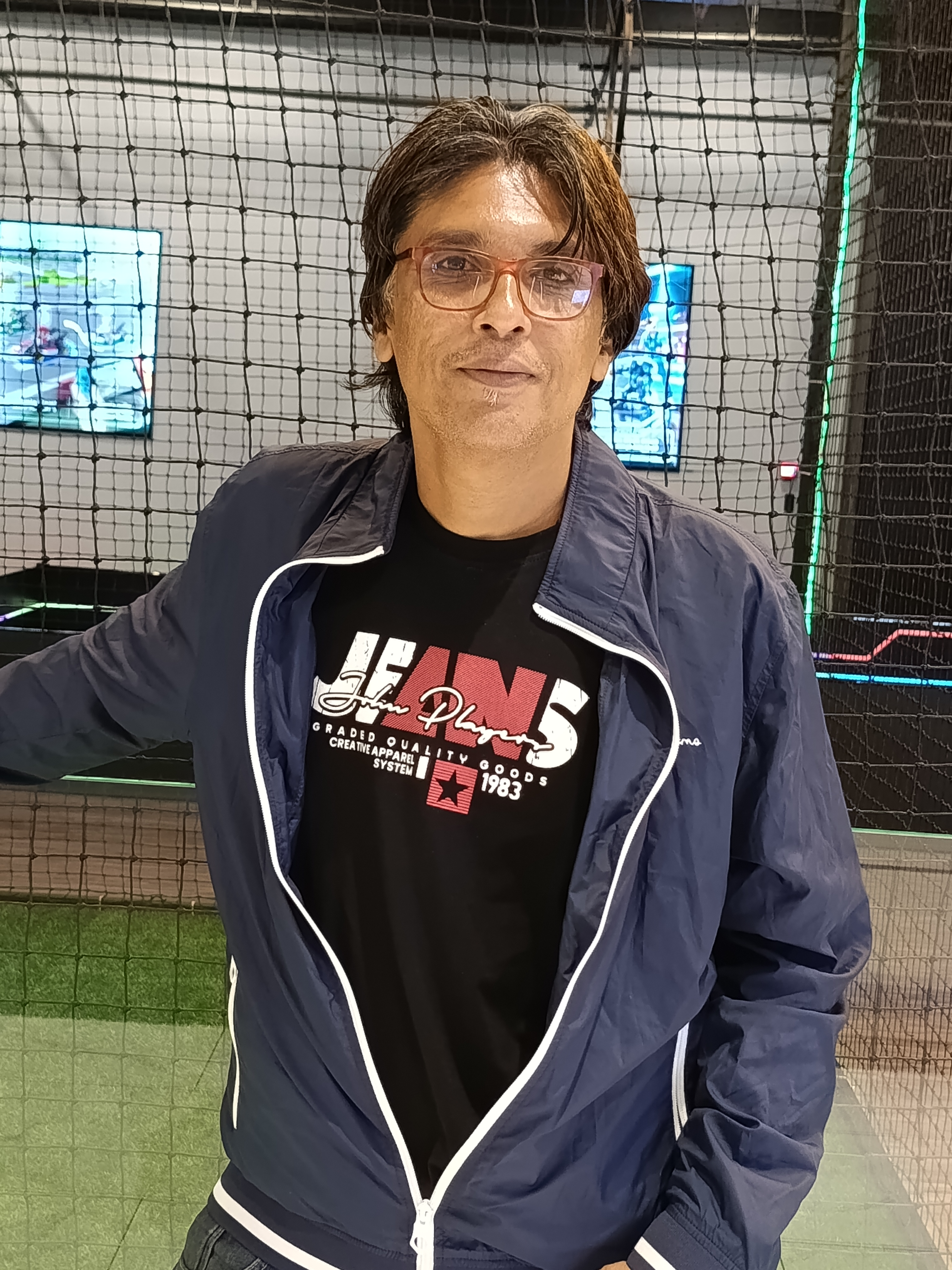
- Santosh Sethumadhavan
- Born: India
- Occupations: Filmmaker, scriptwriter
- Years active: 2008 – present
- Spouse: Navina
- Children: 2
- Parent(s): K. S. Sethumadhavan, Valsala Sethumadhavan

Santosh Sethumadhavan is an Indian filmmaker, scriptwriter and creative director. In 2008, under the popular AVA Productions, his short film "Appuvin Nayagan – Spotty (My Hero)", based on a story by Indira Parthasarathy, received the Rajat Kamal at the 56th National Film Awards 2008 for the Best Film on Family Values and subsequently won at the IDPA awards in Mumbai. The film had well-known actor Charuhasan in the pivotal role. Later in 2012, he also directed Chattakkari (2012 film), which was a remake of the 1974 classic of the same name directed by his father and erstwhile director K.S. Sethumadhavan. His other major works include: a docudrama “The Mask of God” for Public Service Broadcasting Trust (PSBT) on behalf of Government of India which was screened recently at the 44th Khajuraho Dance Festival in Madhya Pradesh under the category of "uncommon genre films"; and a recent short film “Where the Trees Sing” in June 2017 under AVA Productions which was based on true incidents narrated in a story written by Vinu Abraham and advocates the importance of preserving forest wealth.

== Early life ==
Santosh is the youngest son of renowned film director K.S. Sethumadhavan and Valsala in Chennai, Tamil Nadu. His family hails from Palakkad, Kerala. He did his schooling at Asan Memorial Senior Secondary School and later took a degree in Corporate Secretaryship from A.M. Jain College.

== Career ==
Being influenced by his father at a very early age, Santosh always wanted a career in the media. He was also greatly motivated by many other stalwarts under whom he had worked as assistant director such as Bharathan, Priyadarshan and P.C. Sreeram. He also worked as a line producer for a news channel managed by the Dinamalar Group, where he had conceptualised and executed many programs of human interest and general entertainment. He has also directed travelogues for Tamil Nadu and Pondicherry Tourism. He has directed corporate films for O&M on behalf of Cadbury's India and Government sectors. He also made many promotional films for market-based wellness products such as Divine Noni, wherein he had also worked with actor Jaya Prada.

A documentary film "Kathayudae Samvidhanam" portraying the iconic 94-year old director K.S. Sethumadhavan has been released by Malayala Manorama in October 2021 directed by Santosh Sethumadhavan. In 2022, he completed a promotional film for Siddha medicine on behalf of NFDC. Currently, Santosh is working on an anthology series for Manorama Max, which will be released soon.

Santosh is married to Navina, writer and costume designer for his various works. His has two children, Arya and Neil.

== Filmography ==
- Appuvin Nayagan – Spotty (short film)
- Chattakkari (2012)
- The Mask of God (documentary)
- Where the Trees Sing (short film)
- Kathayudae Samvidhanam (2021)
