= Kannamoochi =

- Genre: Horror
- Written by: G R Aadithya
- Directed by: Avinaash Hariharan
- Starring: Shamna Kasim; Amzath; Baby Aaradhya Shri; Shwethaa Shri
- Theme music composer: Sundaramurthy K S
- Country of origin: India
- Original language: Tamil
- No. of seasons: 1
- No. of episodes: 5

Production
- Producers: Happy Unicorn and TrendLoud Production House
- Production locations: Mumbai, Maharashtra, India
- Cinematography: Prasanna Kumar
- Editor: Ranjeet C K
- Camera setup: Multi-camera
- Running time: 30 to 35 minutes per episode

Original release
- Network: ZEE5
- Release: 13 March 2020

Kannamoochi (transl. "Hide and Seek") is a 2020 Indian Indian-Tamil-language horror web series an Original for ZEE5 and directed by Avinaash Hariharan and produced by Happy Unicorn and TrendLoud Production House. The series stars Shamna Kasim, Amzath, Baby Aaradhya Shri, Shwethaa Shri and Smarabh. The series comprised five episodes and was released on ZEE5 on 13 March 2020.

== Plot ==
Priya with her deaf and dumb daughter Aishu, relocate to Chennai from Bangalore for a new life in a dilapidated apartment. Twenty years before in the same apartment complex, a family of four, face a tragic incident. Except for a mentally challenged boy, the rest of the family was brutally murdered. Inspector Louthersamy who was investigating the case dies a mysterious death when he almost cracked the case. Priya's daughter Aishu disappears in a procession. Priya desperately searches for her and in the process realises that Manju is a part of the deceased family which was murdered twenty years back. Priya needs to resolve the mystery behind the brutal murder which happened twenty years ago to get her daughter back.

== Cast ==
- Poorna as Priya
- Amzath as Santosh
- Baby Aaradhya Shri as Aishu
- Shwethaa Shri as Manju
- Smarabh as Balu
- Bhargav as Young Balu
- Vivek Prasanna as Devaraj
- Gayathri as Devaraj's wife
- Bose Venkat as Loudersamy
- Subhashini as Loudersamy's wife
- Sri Charan as Inspector
- Saranya as Poongavanam
- Radhakrishnan as Doctor
- Rukmani as Doctor's wife

== Episodes ==
No. overall	No. in season	Title	Directed by	Concept & Story	Original release date
1	1	"The 6th Floor"	Avinaash Hariharan	G R Aadithya	13 March 2020
Episodic synopsis - Priya and her Daughter Aishu relocate to Chennai from Bangalore and move into an apartment on the 9th floor. Priya finds something strange and unusual about the 6th floor in the apartment. Priya and Aishu leave out to the supermarket and on the way, Priya loses her wallet and Aishu falls sick on the way home. Santosh finds the wallet and calls Priya to inform about the wallet. The next day Priya goes and meets Santosh to pick up her wallet and there she loses Aishu in the middle of a Good Friday, March.
2	2	"Aishu goes missing"	Avinaash Hariharan	G R Aadithya	13 March 2020
Priya panics and along with Santosh goes desperately searching for Aishu. Priya while searching for Aishu in the park meets a strange young girl. Priya ends up losing the girl and goes to the police station and informs the inspector that the young girl is the one who is hiding Aishu. The inspector does not believe her. Priya leaves back home and finds Aishu there - which is actually revealed to be a dream. Priya thinks - Flashback of Ram telling her to always search properly and that she will find something. Priya then goes back to the park and enters illegally and gets caught by the police who warns her not to do this again. Priya gets back to the apartment and spots a little girl on the 6th floor standing in front of a door. Priya then breaks into the house and finds shocking details.
3	3	"The puzzle"	Avinaash Hariharan	G R Aadithya	13 March 2020
Episodic synopsis - The inspector comes to Priya's apartment after the neighbours complain about a door being broken and investigate. Priya tells the inspector about what she finds at the house. The police start their investigation from their side. Santosh decides to help Priya in finding Aishu and goes looking for details about the girl. Santosh and Priya go to the writer's house who was the first part of that missing girl's investigation give them a lead on what happened and about Loudersamy who was the inspector who was investigating the case back then. Santosh and Priya go to Loudersamy's house and find more details about the girl and her family.
4	4	"The Haunted memories"	Avinaash Hariharan	G R Aadithya	13 March 2020
Episodic synopsis - Priya and Santosh go through the evidence box from Loudersamy's daughter. They find a tape which reveals few details of Manju's family. Poorna and Santosh go the asylum in search of Balu. Priya gets home and sees the video again when the old lady from the lift comes in and is shocked to see the video and tells them about the family. Poorna gets reminded of Aishu and cuts to flashbacks when Aishu was born. Priya then decides to bring Balu home and recreates the birthday of Manju from the video to rekindle Balu's memory. Balu on seeing the decoration gets reminded of that day and runs away. Poorna feels helpless.
5	5	TBA	Avinaash Hariharan	G R Aadithya	13 March 2020
Episodic synopsis - Priya goes in search of Balu. Priya finds Balu outside a house throwing stones at it. Priya gets into the house and finds a lady sitting in a wheelchair emotionless. Priya screams and cries asking where her daughter is. Priya starts searching for the house and then finds a room filled with kids toys and clothes. Priya then gets into a room with frozen bodies of kids. Priya panics and starts searching for Aishu when the villain spots her and knocks her unconscious after a lot of struggle Priya with the help of Balu and Santosh rescues Aishu.
