= Monisha =

Monisha is a variant of the Indian given name Manisha. Notable people with the name include:

- Monisha Behal, social development activist
- Monisha Blessy, Tamil film and television actress
- Monisha Ghosh, electrical engineer
- Monisha Kaltenborn (née Narang) (born 1971), Austrian businesswoman
- Monisha Rajesh (born 1982), British journalist and travel writer
- Monisha Shaji (formerly Monisha Arshak), actress in South Indian television
- Monisha Singha (born 2007), footballer
- Monisha Unni (1971–1992), actress in South Indian films
- Monisha Sarabhai, fictional character in the sitcom Sarabhai vs Sarabhai

== See also ==
- Monisha En Monalisa, a 1999 Indian Tamil-language romance film
