= Vaddepalli Srinivas =

Indian singer

- Born: 4 July 1960; Warangal, Andhra Pradesh, India (now in Telangana, India)
- Died: 29 February 2024 (aged 63); Hyderabad, Telangana, India
- Occupation: Singer
- Years active: 1994–2024
- Spouse: Indira
- Musical career
- Genres: Folk; filmi; world music
- Instrument: Vocals

Vaddepalli Srinivas (4 July 1960–29 February 2024) was an Indian singer and folk artist who worked in Telugu cinema. He had won Filmfare Award for Best Male Playback Singer – Telugu for the song "Gannulanti Kannulunna Pilla" from Gabbar Singh (2012).

== Early life and career ==
Vaddepalli Srinivas was born in Warangal district of Andhra Pradesh (now in Telangana), India. His family moved to Hyderabad in his childhood. He started singing at the age of 3. He was initially interested in sports and worked as a physical education teacher at a school in Krishna district. Later, he released an independent album Kaliki Chilukalu in 1994 through Meghana Audio which became popular. The same year he debuted as a playback singer with "Garam Garam Pyai Gajjala Sanari" song, composed by Raj–Koti from the film Namste Anna. He has later sung many independent folk songs.

== Discography ==
=== Songs ===
Year	Song(s)	Work
1994	"Garam Garam Pyai Gajjala Sanari"	Namste Anna
1995	"Yem Konetattu Ledu"	Errodu
2008	"Yenthapani Chestiviro"	King
2012	"Gannulanti Kannulunna Pilla"	Gabbar Singh
2018	"Raaye Raaye Chinni"	Bengal Tiger

=== Studio albums ===
Year	Title	Studio
1994	Kaliki Chilukalu	Sony Music
2000	Oh Pilla Bangarama	Sony Music
2008	Palleturi Pilla	Gayatree Music

== Death ==
Srinivas died on 29 February 2024, aged 64, at his residence in Hyderabad due to health related issues.

== Awards and nominations ==
Award	Year	Category	Work	Result	Ref.
Filmfare Awards South	2013	Best Male Playback Singer – Telugu	"Gannulanti Kannulunna Pilla" (from Gabbar Singh)	Won	
