= King (2008 film) =

2008 Indian Telugu film directed by Srinu Vaitla

- Theatrical release poster
- Directed by: Srinu Vaitla
- Screenplay by: Srinu Vaitla; B. V. S. Ravi (dialogue)
- Story by: Kona Venkat; Gopimohan
- Produced by: D. Siva Prasad Reddy
- Starring: Nagarjuna Akkineni; Trisha; Mamta Mohandas; Srihari
- Cinematography: Prasad Murella
- Edited by: M. R. Varma
- Music by: Devi Sri Prasad
- Production company: Kamakshi Movies
- Release date: 25 December 2008
- Running time: 181 minutes
- Country: India
- Language: Telugu

King is a 2008 Indian Telugu-language action comedy film directed by Srinu Vaitla. It stars Nagarjuna in the titular role, alongside Trisha, Srihari, and Mamta Mohandas. The film features an ensemble supporting cast including Brahmanandam, Sunil, Chandra Mohan, Deepak, Krishna Bhagawan, Sayaji Shinde, Geetha, Srinivasa Reddy, and Master Bharath. The music was composed by Devi Sri Prasad.

The film follows King, a wealthy heir who is presumed dead after an assassination attempt, leading to a series of events involving mistaken identities and a conspiracy within his own family. The film's comedy scenes have gained cult status and are frequently referenced in Telugu internet culture and meme pages.

== Plot ==
King hails from a royal family, having taken over the legacy and riches after the death of his father, Raja Ravi Chandra Varma. King has a younger brother, Ajay, a mother, a maternal uncle, and his late father's three sisters, who are married. Their husbands are Appaji, Kona Venkat, and Gopi Mohan. The uncles steal money that is for the workers. They make it look as though the employee Chandu is responsible. King believes and fires Chandu. Suddenly, King knew the uncles had hidden the money in their room. He kept quiet because of his aunts.

Before King leaves the airport, a mysterious guy follows King. A few days later, King and Swapna discuss something next to a graveyard. The same creepy guy from the airport tries to shoot King, but misses. King chases the shooter to the cemetery, but the shooter suddenly disappears. Munna calls King's cell phone. King tells Munna that he's in a graveyard. Munna asks if King is OK, to which he says yes. Unfortunately, Swapna shoots King from behind. He sees her face and realizes that she is working with the shooter. Swapna reshoots King. King is presumed dead. Munna tells the police that King went missing. At least one day later, when the police take Munna to a hospital morgue, a dead body looks like King. Munna tells the police that none of the corpses is King's body. Kona Venkat and Gopi Mohan say that Appaji is responsible for King's disappearance. Appaji escapes, and it is assumed that he is responsible. King's mother believes that her son is safe.

Another story thread is incorporated through the introduction of gangster Bottu Seenu, who falls in love with singer Sravani. Sravani does not care for a wastrel like Bottu Seenu, so he poses as a software engineer named Sarath to impress her. Bottu Seenu meets the real Sarath. Sravani's elder brother, Gnaneswar, knows Bottu Seenu, but he would get mad at Bottu Seenu for loving Sravani. Bottu Seenu pretends to be Sarath, who wears a tie, shirt, and pants. Gnaneswar gets fooled, too. The real Sarath mistakenly imposes Bottu Seenu in front of a cop by mistake.

Meanwhile, Appaji sends goons to look for King, thinking he's still alive. They run into Bottu Seenu, who thrashes them. Appaji proposes a deal to Bottu Seenu and asks him to pose as King and return to the palace. After Munna informed King's family that King had disappeared, Appaji tried to escape, but Munna picked him up. Munna gave a picture of the King's corpse, time, and date to Appaji. Appaji had nothing to do with King's murder. Once Bottu Seenu gets access to King's bank accounts, Appaji can repay his debts because he borrowed a lot of money from goons. Sravani and Gnaneswar mistake Bottu Seenu for Sharath again. They accompany Bottu Seenu to the palace. It is revealed that Swapna is none other than Chandu's daughter, but Chandu committed suicide because nobody believed that he did not steal the money; Bhagath Seth hired Swapna and the mysterious shooter; the mysterious shooter is Baba, and Swapna's real name is Pooja.

Bhagath hires Pooja to kill King's brother Ajay. Ajay brings his girlfriend, Pooja, to his home. Suddenly, Bottu Seenu attacks Pooja, but a few seconds later, he has no idea what happened. Gnaneshwar believes King's spirit came to get revenge and control Bottu Seenu. Bottu Seenu gets engaged to Sravani. Pooja knows that the King is not living in the palace right now. Bhagath hires many guys, including Baba, to dress up in black and kill King's impostor and Ajay in the court during the night. Bhagath Seth thinks that he shouldn't trust girls, including Pooja. King's spirit controls Bottu Seenu and saves Ajay from Pooja. Another twist is that Ajay met Pooja right before she killed King. She feels Ajay depends too much on his brother, so he tells her to kill King, where it is revealed that Bottu Seenu/Sharath is King.

Munna captures Baba, who reveals his motive for planning to kill Swapna, who is Chandu's daughter, too. Pooja said what happened that day, but didn't kill King. The father and friends who cared for Bottu Seenu were Munna's people. Munna's real name is Bottu Seenu. King says that Ajay's mistake is unforgivable. King's family members are feeling sad, so he decides to leave. He dies in an explosion that takes place in his car. King's mother leaves and doesn't want anyone to look for her. Everyone else is probably still mad at Ajay. It is found that King is still alive.

He reveals his plan only to Shravani: King asks Bhagath's henchman (who kidnapped Ajay at the beginning of the movie) to tell him about Bhagath's evil plans. After King got shot, Munna took him to the hospital. Swapna's details were fake, so they couldn't find her. He decided to play this double-role drama. Bhagath's henchman/King's informer reveals the shooter is working for Bhagath, too, but doesn't find details about Swapna. When King met his uncles again, none had anything to do with it. King realized that Ajay was behind everything. King's informer blew up King's car after he escaped. This was King's plan too. The informer puts a bomb inside Bhagath's car, too, so King talks to Bhagath on the phone before Bhagath dies. King pretends to be Sarath in front of everyone else.

Bottu Seenu/Munna's father and friends were responsible for messing up the lights and pulling the tables with a rope in King's palace. They did it to make it look like King's spirit came for revenge.

== Cast ==
- Nagarjuna Akkineni as "King" Raja Chandra Pratap Varma / Bottu Seenu / Sarath
- Trisha as Sravani
- Srihari as Gnaneswar Bhai
- Mamta Mohandas as Swapna / Pooja
- Brahmanandam as Jayasurya
- Sunil as Sarath
- Bharat Dabholkar as Bhagat Seth
- Shobhan Babu as Rama Chandra Murthy, King's father
- Chandra Mohan as Narayana
- Deepak as Yuvaraja Ajay Varma “Ajay”
- Jaya Prakash Reddy as Appaji
- Krishna Bhagawan as Kona Venkat
- Sayaji Shinde as Gopi Mohan
- Geetha as Janaki, King's mother
- Dharmavarapu Subramanyam as Subramanyam, King's uncle
- Sudha as Rajyalakshmi, King's aunt
- Madhu Shalini as King's cousin
- M. S. Narayana as Sravani's uncle
- Surya as Chandu, Swapna's father
- Ajay as Coal Kittu
- Supreeth as Munna / Bottu Seenu
- AVS as Manager
- Venu Madhav as Tension Bonda
- Radha Kumari as Sarath's grandmother
- Raavi Kondala Rao as Sarath's grandfather
- Abhinaya as Sravani's friend
- Srinivasa Reddy as Sai Kishore, Jayasurya's PA
- Fish Venkat as Gnaneswar's henchman
- Duvvasi Mohan as Panthulu
- Jeeva as Wizard
- Master Bharath as Master
- Prudhviraj
- Gundu Sudarshan
- Narsing Yadav
- Banerjee
- Sravan
- Gautam Raju
- Jenny
- Chitram Srinu as Bottu Seenu's henchman
- Giridhar as Bottu Seenu's henchman
- Rama Chandar as Bottu Seenu's henchman
- Venu Yeldandi as Bottu Seenu's henchman
- Apoorva as King's aunt
- Srilalitha as Sravani's friend
- Rajitha as Sravani's aunt
- Bharat as Appaji's son
- Amith as Bhagath's son
- Chitti as DCP
- Devadas Kanakala as Secretariat Gopal Rao
- Chitraleka as Anchor
- Tarzan as Rowdy

Cameo appearances

- Genelia D'Souza in the song "Nuvvu Ready Nenu Ready"
- Kamna Jethmalani in the song "Nuvvu Ready Nenu Ready"
- Charmy Kaur in the song "Nuvvu Ready Nenu Ready"
- Anushka Shetty in the song "Nuvvu Ready Nenu Ready"
- Priyamani in the song "Nuvvu Ready Nenu Ready"
- Sneha Ullal in the song "Nuvvu Ready Nenu Ready"
- Ramajogayya Sastry as himself
- Kelly Dorjee in the title song "K-I-N-G"

== Soundtrack ==
King

Film score by Devi Sri Prasad
- Released: 27 November 2008
- Recorded: 2008
- Genre: Soundtrack
- Length: 40:31
- Label: Aditya Music
- Producer: Devi Sri Prasad

Devi Sri Prasad chronology
Sangama (2008)	King (2008)	Villu (2009)

Music was composed by Devi Sri Prasad. The tune of "O Manmadhuda" is reused from the title track of the Kannada film Sangama. Music was released on Aditya Music audio label. The following actors appeared in the film's "Nuvvu Ready Nenu Ready" song segment: Genelia, Shriya, Kamna Jethmalani, Charmy, Anushka, Priyamani, and Sneha Ullal.

No.	Title	Lyrics	Singer(s)	Length
1.	"K-I-N-G"	Ramajogayya Sastry	Leslie Lewis, Mamta Mohandas, Devi Sri Prasad (Chorus)	5:27
2.	"A to Z"	Ramajogayya Sastry	Naveen Madhav, Priya Himesh	4:45
3.	"Chupu Chaalu O Manmadhudaa"	Ramajogayya Sastry	Sagar, Divya	4:46
4.	"Yenthapani Chestiviro"	Ramajogayya Sastry, Sahithi	Vaddepalli Srinivas, Priya Himesh	5:23
5.	"Ghanana Ghanana"	Ramajogayya Sastry	Ujjayinee	3:38
6.	"Nenu Nee Raja"	Ramajogayya Sastry	Rahul Nambiar, Andrea Jeremiah	5:17
7.	"Ghanana (Funny)"	Ramajogayya Sastry	Mamta Mohandas	1:51
8.	"Nuvvu Ready Nenu Ready"	Ramajogayya Sastry	Shankar Mahadevan, Gopika Poornima, Geetha Madhuri Priyamani (Cameo appearance)	5:31
9.	"King (The DSP Mix)"	Ramajogayya Sastry	Devi Sri Prasad	3:51
Total length:				40:31

== Reception ==
On the review aggregator website Rotten Tomatoes, 40% of 5 critics' reviews are positive, with an average rating of 7/10.

The Times of India gave the film 3 stars out of 5 and wrote: "Being a star-centric film, director Sreenu Vytla sensibly blends action into his comedy plot and succeeds to quite an extent, barring a few lapses. However, the director's forte has always been fun-centric movies, and again he doesn't disappoint on that score." Idlebrain.com rated 3/5 and opined that the film's screenplay is "extremely complicated" and "The director could not evenly distribute the twists in the film."
