= Shamna Kasim =

Indian actress

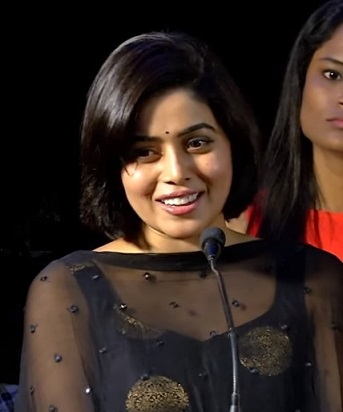
- Shamna in 2019
- Born: Shamna Kasim; Thayyil, Kannur, Kerala, India
- Other name: Poorna
- Occupations: Actress, dancer
- Years active: 2004–present
- Spouse: Shanid Asif Ali (m. 2022)
- Children: 2

Shamna Kasim, also known by her stage name Poorna is an Indian actress, dancer, and model, who appears in Telugu, Tamil, Malayalam and Kannada films.

== Early life ==
She was born in Kannur to a Malayalee couple Kasim and Ramla. She has done her schooling from St. Teresas Anglo-Indian Higher Secondary School in Kannur after shifting from Ursuline Senior Secondary School. She shifted her school to concentrate more on her dancing skills.

She resides in Kochi, Kerala.

== Career ==
=== 2004–2011: Early struggle ===
She made her acting debut in the 2004 Malayalam film Manju Poloru Penkutty. She played her first major role in her debut Telugu film Sri Mahalakshmi (2007), while playing the lead female character in her first Tamil film, Muniyandi Vilangial Moonramandu (2008).

Her biggest hit came with Jhossh (2009), a Kannada movie that completed 100 days in the theatres. She has starred in several Tamil films including Kodaikanal (2008), Kandhakottai (2009), Drohi (2010), Aadu Puli (2011), Vellore Maavattam (2011) and Vithagan (2011).

=== 2012–2016: Experimental roles and television ===
She is best known for her Malayalam movies Chattakkari (2012), Aaru Sundarimaarude Katha (2013) and Mili (2015).

Kasim appeared in a series of films where she portrayed a ghost, with The Hindu labelling her as "the ghost queen of South films". She essayed the lead role in Avunu (2012) and the sequel Avunu 2 (2015) that were successful at the box office. In this brief period of time, she turned down several similar scripts, before acting as a ghost again in Raju Gari Gadhi (2015), which became a hit at the box office.

She extended her appearance from silver screen to numerous Television projects in Telugu and Malayalam, particularly as a Judge in dance reality shows that bought her closer to the audiences. In 2016, she was cast in Telugu comedy Jayammu Nischayammu Raa.

=== 2017–present ===
Shamna shaved her head completely bald for her role in the Kodiveeran (2017), but the movie met with average reviews.

She has also done a lot of Malayalam films like Madhura Raja (2019), Maarconi Mathaai (2019) and Telugu films Akhanda (2021), Drushyam 2 (2021), Dasara (2023) as well. In 2024, she appeared in Tamil horror thriller, Devil.

Poorna had a solo release in 2025 reprising her role from Akhanda in its sequel, Akhanda 2: Thaandavam. Her performance in the chartbuster Kurchi Madathapetti song was a viral hit. In 2026, she was featured in another chart-buster song alongside Superstar Rajinikanth in Jailer 2.

== Personal life ==
In June 2020, police arrested members of a gang on a complaint lodged by Shamna's mother that they blackmailed her daughter. Police revealed that the gang locked film actresses in hotel rooms and forced them to accompany as escorts for transporting black money. Shamna married Shanid Asif Ali, a Dubai-based businessman in October 2022, and they have two children: a son and a daughter.

== Filmography ==
=== Film ===
List of Shamna Kasim / Poorna film credits
Year	Title	Role	Language	Notes
2004	Manju Poloru Penkutty	Dhanya	Malayalam	
2005	Hridayathil Sookshikkan	Model	Malayalam	
2005	Junior Senior	Model	Malayalam	
2006	Pachakuthira	Raji	Malayalam	
2006	Bhargavacharitham Moonam Khandam	Radhika	Malayalam	
2006	Ennittum	Student	Malayalam	
2007	Sri Mahalakshmi	Sri Mahalakshmi	Telugu	
2007	Ali Bhai	Kingini	Malayalam	
2007	Flash	Machi	Malayalam	
2008	College Kumaran	Sreekutti	Malayalam	
2008	Muniyandi Vilangial Moonramandu	Madhumitha	Tamil	
2008	Kodaikanal	Brinda	Tamil	
2009	Kandhakottai	Pooja	Tamil	
2009	Jhossh	Meena	Kannada	
2010	Drohi	Malar	Tamil	
2010	9 KK Road	Rosemary	Malayalam	
2011	Aadu Puli	Anjali Thillainayagam	Tamil	
2011	Seema Tapakai	Sathya	Telugu	
2011	Makaramanju	model	Malayalam	
2011	Vellore Maavattam	Priya	Tamil	
2011	Vithagan	Mercy	Tamil	
2012	Chattakaari	Julie	Malayalam	
2012	Avunu	Mohini	Telugu	
2013	Aaru Sundarimaarude Katha	Meena Sreekumar	Malayalam	
2013	Radhan Ganda	Radha	Kannada	
2013	Jannal Oram	Nirmala David	Tamil	
2013	Thagaraaru	Meenakshi	Tamil	
2014	Laddu Babu	Maya	Telugu	
2014	Nuvvala Nenila	Mahalakshmi	Telugu	
2014	Rajadhi Raja	Dancer	Malayalam	Item Dance in Song "Dhan Than "
2015	Mili	Renuka	Malayalam	
2015	Avunu 2	Mohini	Telugu	
2015	Sakalakala Vallavan	Dancer	Tamil	Special appearance
2015	Srimanthudu	Dancer	Telugu	Special appearance
2015	Rajugari Gadhi	Bommali	Telugu	
2015	Mama Manchu Alludu Kanchu	Shruthi Naidu	Telugu	
2016	Jayammu Nischayammu Raa	Rani	Telugu	
2016	Manal Kayiru 2	Nisha	Tamil	
2017	Kodiveeran	Velu	Tamil	
2018	Savarakathi	Subhadra	Tamil	
2018	Oru Kuttanadan Blog	S.I Neena	Malayalam	
2018	Aanakkallan	Rosy Thomas	Malayalam	
2018	Evanukku Engeyo Matcham Irukku	S.I Geetha	Tamil	
2018	Adanga Maru	Subash's lawyer	Tamil	
2018	Silly Fellows	Krishnaveni	Telugu	
2019	Madhura Raja	Amala	Malayalam	
2019	Marconi Mathai	Treesa	Malayalam	
2019	Kaappaan	Priya Joseph	Tamil	
2020	Lock Up	Malliga	Tamil	Released on ZEE5
2021	Power Play	Poorna	Telugu	
2021	Sundari	Sundari	Telugu	
2021	Thalaivi	V. K. Sasikala	Tamil; Hindi	
2021	100	Anagha	Kannada	
2021	Akhanda	Padmavathi	Telugu	Nominated, SIIMA Award for Best Supporting Actress – Telugu
2021	Drushyam 2	Adv. Renuka	Telugu	Amazon Prime Video release
2022	Visithiran	Stella	Tamil	
2022	Tees Maar Khan	Vasudha	Telugu	
2023	Suvarna Sundari	Anjali	Telugu	
2023	Dasara	Vadhinamma	Telugu	
2023	Ala Ila Ela	Anu	Telugu	
2023	Asalu	Vandana	Telugu	
2024	Devil	Hema	Tamil	
2024	Guntur Kaaram	Ramola	Telugu	Special appearance in the song "Kurchi Madathapetti"
2024	Bhimaa	Kali	Telugu	
2024	Oru Thee	Anu	Tamil	Released on Thanthi One
2025	Akhanda 2: Thaandavam	Padmavathi IAS	Telugu	
2026	Jailer 2	Dancer	Tamil	Special appearance in the song "Ala Bolelo"

=== Television ===
List of Poorna television credits
Year	Title	Role	Language	Network
2020	Kannamoochi	Priya	Tamil	ZEE5
2021	Navarasa	Lakshmi	Tamil	Netflix
2021	3 Roses	Indu	Telugu	Aha

==== Television shows ====
List of Poorna television show credits
Year	Title	Role	Channel	Language	Notes
2019, 2021	Sixth Sense (game show)	Participant	Star Maa	Telugu	Game show
2021	Udan Panam	Contestant	Mazhavil Manorama	Malayalam	Game show
Not specific	Dhee Telugu (Dance show)	Judge	ETV	Telugu	Dance show
