= Monisha Behal =

Indian social development activist

- Born: India
- Other name: Dr. Monisha Behal
- Organization: https://northeastnetwork.org/

Monisha Behal is an Indian social development activist working for the social and economic development and empowering women in Assam, Nagaland and other neighboring states in eastern India. She is a founding member of North East Network, a women's rights organisation linking with rural and urban women and organisations on development and related issues within North East India.

Monisha travels extensively in rural areas of India, conducting research, giving talks and writing several articles to highlight issues of the North East of India. She initiated several projects on women's development within the region, one of which has grown into a significant community based initiative in Nagaland.

== North East Network (NEN) ==
Monisha Behal is the CEO of North East Network (NEN), a women's rights organisation connecting with rural and urban women and organisations on development and related issues within North East India. started in 1995, where ,

== Chizami Weaves ==
Chizami Weaves is a decentralised livelihood project started by Behal in the mid-1990s to create opportunities for the women of Chizami, a small village in Nagaland's Phek district. Today it has a network of more than 300 women in Chizami and 10 other villages in Phek district, and their work is now sold across India.
