= Komanduri Ramachari =

Indian playback singer

Komanduri Ramachary
- Born: 22 January 1965 (age 61); Medak, Telangana
- Occupations: Singer, music composer, teacher
- Parents: Krishnamachari (father); Yasodamma (mother)
- Website: littlemusiciansacademy.com

Komanduri Ramachary is an Indian playback singer, composer and music teacher who predominantly works in Telugu films. Ramachary is the Founder of Little Musicians Academy (LMA). Ramachary was born in Medak District, Telangana and brought up in Hyderabad, Telangana. His first film as music director was PremaLekha Raasa. SP Balasubramanyam, a renowned playback singer in Telugu, Tamil, Kannada, Malayalam and Hindi cinema has been a guide and inspiration. His songs are for the movies Sambaram, Ramayanam, Sri Ramadasu and Guntur Kaaram.

Ramachary has performed all over India and abroad in countries, including America, Australia, Kuwait and Dubai. He has won many Awards like Andhra Pradesh State government NANDI Award, Delhi Telugu Academy Award, Vamsee International Award, and Kalaradhana Award. He was also awarded an honorary doctorate by Vignan Foundation for Science, Technology and Research (Deemed to be University) on August 2, 2025.

== Early life and background ==
Ramachary was born to Komanduri Krishnamachary and Yashodamma in Medak District of Telangana. Ramachary's musical journey started at a very young age when he used to accompany his father, a Harikatha artist, for his concerts in various villages. He learned Carnatic classical music from Kumari. Oruganti Leelavathi garu and light music from P.V.Sai Baba Garu, son of Putcha Subba Rao garu and nephew of P. V. Parabrahma Sastry.

He struggled hard to complete training in music as well as graduation. He also completed his BEd from Osmania University. Through these years, he won many accolades for his rendition of devotional songs and light music in radio and television shows.

== Occupation highlights ==
He has been a mentor for many reality shows on various television channels. He is a founder of Little Musicians Academy, established in the year 1998 imparting free training, guiding and promoting talented children and youngsters in music (free of cost) with the motto of peace and international brotherhood through music. Under the mentorship, coaching and able guidance of Ramachary, LMA Recognises talent, provide training in light music (Film songs, geet, ghazals, group songs, patriotic songs etc.), light classical music (Annamacharya, Purandharadas and Ramadasa keertanalu etc.). It provides nuances and techniques of singing like breath management, voice modulation, emoting etc. while keeping shruthi and laya in mind. Students also learn techniques like body language, holding mikes, voice throwing etc. through real time exposure to stage and recording studios. So far LMA trained over 3000 children. Most of the students of LMA have become professional playback singers and channel stars. Students of LMA are moulded into wonderful human beings.

== Personal life ==
Ramachary is married to Sujatha Dhawala and has a son Saketh Komanduri and a daughter Sahithi Komanduri (Sony).
