= Thayyil =

- suburb
- Country: India
- State: Kerala
- District: Kannur

Languages
  - Official: Malayalam, English
- Time zone: UTC+5:30 (IST)
- PIN: 670 003
- Telephone code: +91497
- ISO 3166 code: IN-KL
- Vehicle registration: KL-13
- Nearest city: Kannur

Thayyil is an Indian family name and surname found predominantly in the State of Kerala, India, used by many communities including, Nambiars, Thiyyas, Muslims and Christians. The word in old Malayalam means Beautiful, Pretty, etc. The word "Thayyilale" is used to refer a beautiful girl in old Malayalam.

== Etymology ==
Probably this lineage has started with Thayyil, a family in Kannur district of Kerala state, south India. It is a family name which has its origin in a Nair royal lady. Thayyil Tharawad is situated in Thalikave ward Kannur. It is believed that one of two sisters of a Nair family had to flee Vatakara due to riots that broke out there. One of them married Valli Karanavar of the Thayyil family and the other sister married into the Arakkal, a prominent Muslim family.

== Thayyil Tharawad ==
The Thayyil family lineage is more than 900 years old and its branches are spread far and wide and those interested could trace its genealogy with one of the direct descending families living in Govinda Sadanam, Thalikave Road, Kannur. This family is also related to Onden Tharavad, Koroth Thravad, Vengilat, Palliyath etc.which are also Thiyya Tharavads.

== Temple Lineage ==
The family is also closely associated with Lord Muthappan of Parassinikkadavu, through his grace and blessing. Tradition requires that the Annual Festival ('Ulsavam') of the Muthappan Temple at Parassinikkadavu is to be started by a procession led by a female member of the "Thayyil" clan of Thayyil, Kannur from the family home with Kalaripayattu and Chenda to the main altar of the temple, where she offers a 'Pooja' (prayer) to the God. There is a room inside the temple premises which is specifically for them to be used on the day of the "Ulsavam". After the Ulsavam is done, Lord Muthappan himself drops the members of the Thayyil family off until the gates of the temple.

An example of a famous Tayil today in 2023 is author Chirakkal T. Sreedharan Nair the son of a Raja of Tayil. Chirakkal T. Sreedharan Nair is the third son of His Highness C.k Rama varma valiya raja of Chirakkal kovilakam and thayil kalyanikutty kettilamma. He is famous as The King of Kalarippayattu.

== Thayyil Beach ==
Also there is a place named Thayyil in the coastal area 3 kilometers away from Kannur town famous for a mosque called Thayyil Juma Masjid. Other religious shrines of this area are Thayyil Sree Venkataramana Temple, Shri Kurumba temple and St. Antony's church.

== Thayyil Padinhare Purayil ==
Thayyil Padinchare Purayil is a Muslim family of Kavvayi island near Payyannur town. This ancient family has branches in Valapattanam and Taliparamba.
