= Chattakkari (2012 film) =

Chattakari
- Directed by: Santosh Sethumadhavan
- Screenplay by: Thoppil Bhasi
- Story by: Pamman
- Produced by: G. Suresh Kumar
- Starring: Shamna Kasim; Hemanth Menon; Innocent; Sukumari; Shelly Kishore
- Cinematography: Vinod Ilampally
- Edited by: B. Ajithkumar; Finn George Modathara
- Music by: M. Jayachandran
- Production company: Revathy Kalamandhir
- Release date: 13 September 2012
- Country: India
- Language: Malayalam

Chattakaari (English: The Anglo Indian Girl) is a 2012 Indian Malayalam-language romantic drama film written by Thoppil Bhasi based on Pamman's famous novel of the same name and directed by Santosh Sethumadhavan. It is the remake of the 1974 film of the same name, directed by K. S. Sethumadhavan, the father of Santhosh. The film was produced by G. Suresh Kumar under the banner of Revathy Kalamandhir. It stars Shamna Kasim in the title roles.

== Plot ==
Julie is the eldest daughter of Morris, an Anglo-Indian engine-driver. Usha her close friend is from an orthodox Hindu Warrier family. At Usha's residence she (Julie) meets her brother Sasi who is studying at a different place. Julie soon falls in love with Sasi. The relationship gets more cozy and Julie gets pregnant. The rest of the plot revolves around the struggles of Julie and her baby boy, against the hypocritic fangs of society. The plot addresses themes like Life of Anglo-Indians in Kerala, the alarming rise in Premarital Pregnancy and the taboo associated with Inter caste Love and Marriage, all of which were hot topics of discussion when the movie released in 1974. According to the producer Suresh Kumar, the relevance of the remake lies in the present day Kerala society, which is still no different from the then society, with respect to these social aspects.

== Cast ==
Artist	Character
Shamna Kasim	Julie
Hemanth Menon	Sasi
Shelly	Usha
Malu Raveendranath	Ilin
Innocent	Morris
Harikrishnan	Richard
Suvarna Mathew	Margarette
Sukumari	Aunty

== Production ==
Being a heroine oriented film, the role of Julie was first to be fixed. Many mainstream Malayalam actresses were considered, and the team zeroed in on Shamna Kasim. Hemanth Menon, who has previously acted in some Malayalam movies was cast as the second lead. Sukumari is the only actress present in both the versions of the movie.

The film was shot predominantly at Ooty, with some scenes being shot at Udhagamandalam railway station, and hill stations in Thiruvananthapuram. The filming completed in a record 25 days. A song was shot at Thommankuthu Waterfall, near Thodupuzha amidst heavy rain.

== Soundtrack ==
Chattakaari : An Everlasting love story, Retold...

Soundtrack album by M. Jayachandran
- Released: 2 June 2012
- Genre: Film soundtrack
- Length: 22:02
- Label: Manorama Music

M. Jayachandran chronology
Mallu Singh (2012)	Chattakaari : An Everlasting love story, Retold... (2012)	Madan Kolli (2012)

The film features a soundtrack composed by M. Jayachandran with lyrics penned by Murukan Kattakada, Rajeev Alunkal, Charu Hariharan. Manorama Music published the music for the film and was released on 2 June 2012 by Honorable Minister for Film Development K. B. Ganesh Kumar at Kanakakkunnu Palace .

=== Track listing ===
No.	Title	Artist(s)	Length
1.	"Nilave Nilave"	Shreya Ghoshal, Sudeep Kumar	4:27
2.	"Oh My Julie"	Rajesh Krishnan, Sangeetha Sreekanth	4:46
3.	"Kaatum Mazhayum"	Vishnu Kurup	4:15
4.	"Anandalola Krishna"	K. S. Chithra	2:30
5.	"Kurumozhiyude Koottile"	Shreya Ghoshal	2:52
6.	"My Heart"	Sugeetha Menon	2:44
