= Avunu (film) =

2012 film by Ravi Babu

- Directed by: Ravi Babu
- Written by: Ravi Babu
- Produced by: Ravi Babu
- Starring: Poorna; Harshvardhan Rane
- Narrated by: Yami Gautam
- Cinematography: N. Sudhakar Reddy
- Music by: Shekar Chandra
- Production company: Flying Frogs
- Distributed by: Suresh Productions; PVP cinema
- Release date: 21 September 2012
- Running time: 115 minutes
- Country: India
- Language: Telugu

Avunu (transl. Yes) is a 2012 Telugu-language horror thriller film written, produced and directed by Ravi Babu and presented by Suresh Productions. Poorna and Harshvardhan Rane star in the film. The score is by Shekar Chandra and cinematography by N. Sudhakar Reddy. The film was made on a budget of ₹ 45 lakhs. It is loosely based on the 1982 American supernatural horror film The Entity and was dubbed in Hindi as Aatma Ka Ghar.

== Plot ==
Long time lovers Mohini (Poorna) and Harsha (Harshvardhan Rane) get married and move into a new community where Harsha had bought a house. Harsha's parents come to stay with them for a few days and also to make sure that the marriage is not consummated before a certain auspicious time. Unknown to the inhabitants of the house a voyeuristic spirit lived there and it takes a certain fascination for Mohini. Unknown to Mohini the spirit follows her around everywhere and finds pleasure in watching her change clothes and taking a shower.

Meanwhile, their neighbours have a son named Vicky who can see spirits and have conversations with them. On a couple of visits to Harsha's house, Vicky has a conversation with the spirit. The adults dismiss his ability to be the overly imaginative mind of a child at work.

When the auspicious day arrives, Harsha's parents leave. Mohini starts packing for the honeymoon in Paris and the randy spirit in a fit of lust attacks Mohini and tries to assault her sexually. Terrified at being attacked by an invisible entity Mohini runs out of her house and seeks sanctuary in the neighbour's house. A visiting relative of the neighbors, an elderly pious woman instills courage in Mohini and takes her back to her house. The spirit kills the old lady brutally. Harsha comes home to a terrified Mohini who wanted to leave the house right away. But circumstances force Mohini and Harsha to stay in the house one more night before they left the house forever. That night proves deadly for both of them. The spirit enters Harsha and tries to assault Mohini. Trying to defend herself, she injures Harsha. Then we see her narrating the story to the police while the spirit Raju (Ravi Babu) is still beside her. The movie ends with Raju still following Mohini in the hospital.

== Cast ==
- Poorna as Mohini
- Harshvardhan Rane as Harsha
- Chakravarthi as Mohan, Harsha's friend
- Ravi Babu as Captain Raju / Rajender Reddy
- Jeeva as CI D. Janardhan
- Gayatri Bhargavi as Swapna, Mohan's wife
- Master Gaurav as Vicky, Mohan & Swapna's son
- Sudha as Swapna's mother-in-law
- Chalapathi Rao as Ranga, Harsha's father
- Delhi Rajeswari as Lakshmi, Harsha's mother
- Dr. Sudha as Yadamma

== Production ==
=== Development ===
The story is based on a true incident that happened to Yami Gautam when she was in her Mumbai apartment. She told the incident to Ravi Babu during the shooting of Nuvvila (2011), in which she and Ravi Babu stayed in the same hotel. Ravi Babu, who felt scared, decided to move out of the hotel.

=== Filming ===
Most of the film was Shot at Outer Ring Road of Hyderabad & near Gandipet. Ravi Babu shot the film on a budget of approximately ₹ 45 Lakhs. The movie was then picked up by D Suresh Babu for approximately ₹ 3.50 Crores after he became convinced about the film's potential. Prasad V Potluri later became associated with the film by picking up a stake from D. Suresh Babu.

Avunu was shot under 50 working days. Post-production took us 3 months including computer graphics work. PVP is planning to release Tamil version at a later point of time. The film was made as a Telugu–Tamil bilingual although the Tamil version was never released.

== Reception ==
DNA India gave a review stating "What keeps Avunu intact is the fact that it encompasses and presents everything within two hours to the audience, who are hooked and wondering what's about to unfold. Unlike Ram Gopal Varma's films, which uses darkness, cinematographer Sudhakar Reddy captures the excitement in bright light. Sekhar Chandra substantiates the tense mood of the film with a fitting background score. Avunu is a thrilling experiment worth watching". Jeevi of Idlebrain.com gave a review of rating 3/5 stating "Telugu film lovers are driven by drama and intensity in this genre. Ravi Babu is a kind of director who directs films within his sensibilities. Avunu is such a kind of thriller where the fear factor and drama aren’t Indianized. If you like film of horror/thriller genre, you may watch it for its sensibilities and different filmmaking techniques."

NDTV gave a review stating "Filmmaker Ravi Babu always presents something new in his films and true to his earlier works, the director has tried to adopt a unique storyline for this horror film too. Overall, definitely worth a watch for all horror movie lovers."

The Hindu gave a review stating "It doesn’t come with a horror certification, so watch it whether you have a weak or strong heart." Rediff.com gave a review of rating 3/5 stating "Avunu is cinema one doesn't get to see often. It is well written and crafted even though it takes its inspiration from Hollywood movies. Ravi Babu scores with this film. If you like the supernatural horror genre, go watch Avunu."

== Sequel ==
Main article: Avunu 2

== See also ==
- Avunu 2
