= Kurchi Madathapetti =

2023 song by Thaman S and Ramajogayya Sastry

- album cover

Single by Thaman S and Ramajogayya Sastry featuring Sahiti Chaganti and Sri Krishna

from the album Guntur Kaaram
- Language: Telugu
- Released: 30 December 2023
- Recorded: 2023
- Studio: Prasad Labs; V Studios
- Genre: Popular; Item number
- Length: 4:43
- Label: Aditya Music
- Composer: Thaman S
- Lyricist: Ramajogayya Sastry
- Producer: Thaman S

Guntur Kaaram track listing
- 1. "Dum Masala"; 2. "Oh My Baby"; 3. "Kurchi Madathapetti"; 4. "Mawaa Enthaina"; 5. "Ramana Aei"; 6. "Amma Song"

Music video
- "Kurchi Madathapetti" on YouTube

"Kurchi Madathapetti" (transl. Folding the chair) is an Indian Telugu-language song composed by Thaman S, with lyrics by Ramajogayya Sastry, and recorded by Sahiti Chaganti and Sri Krishna, for the soundtrack album of the 2024 film Guntur Kaaram, featuring with Mahesh Babu and Sreeleela. It was released on 30 December 2023 (released on YouTube as a lyrical video song) as the third single from the album, through Aditya Music. The full video song, featuring scenes directly from the film, was released on 1 February 2024 on YouTube.

"Kurchi Madathapetti" experienced large amounts of commercial success. Although it was released in December 2023, the song experienced large amounts of commercial success after the film's release in January 2024, and further more after the full video song was released in early-February 2024. The song was at the number one on the Billboard India Songs and was featured on the chart for thirty-eight consecutive weeks.

The song was also released in Hindi, Tamil, Kannada and Malayalam languages with the same title and was included in the respective dubbed versions of the film. The hook-step, the dialogue rendition by Mahesh Babu, the dance performance of Sreeleela, and the vocals by Sahiti Changanti and Sri Krishna fueled the success and made the song viral across the internet. The song has achieved over 600 million views on YouTube.

== Production, lyrics and recording ==
The "Kurchi Madhathapetti" and the extended phrase became popular from a video that became viral and popular on the internet. In the video, a man used this phrase with an expletive word. There was an initial backlash from the audience to use such vulgar phrases in the lyrics.

== Critical reception ==
ETV Bharat stated that, "The latest song from Guntur Kaaram is a vibrant display of Mahesh and Sreeleela's dance prowess coupled with infectious rhythm", further calling it "all-encompassing musical piece". The Hans India opined that the lyrics written by Ramajogayya Sastry evoke a sense of nostalgia with pharses like "Rajahmundry Raaga Manjari" and "Thooniga Nadumulona Thootaletti," reminiscent of the classic mass films from the 1980s, popularized by actor Krishna, father of Mahesh Babu.

== Music video ==
=== Background and production ===
Sekhar has choreographed the dance sequences. Rashmi Gautam has denied rumours of being cast to perform in the song. During an interview with The Times of India, Poorna told that she was hesitant about accepting the offer because of the weight gained after her pregnancy. She further told that she was prepared to face some negative comments about the song.

=== Synopsis ===
The music video is a direct clip from the scenes in Guntur Kaaram. The scenes primarily feature Mahesh Babu, Sreeleela and Poorna.

== Commercial performance ==
"Kurchi Madhathapetti" was one of the fastest video song to reach 30 crore (300 million) views milestone in 133 days, surpassing the "Arabic Kuthu". The full video song has over 60 crore (602 million) views on YouTube, while the lyrical song which was released first, has 12.7 crore (127 million) views.

== Impact ==
The hook-step performed by Mahesh Babu and Sreeleela received widespread popularity resulting in multiple recreated music videos on various short form video platforms such as Instagram Reels. These recreations were also made by various celebrities. The song was played during the game halftime in a National Basketball Association match at the Toyota Center in Houston, Texas, United States. Pavaman Suraj of Pinkvilla called it "foot-tapping", with a particular praise for Sreeleela's dance in the music video, and included it in the "top 5 viral foot-tapping South Indian songs".

== Credits and personnel ==
Credits adapted from YouTube.

- Thaman S – composer, arranger and programmer
- Ramajogayya Sastry – lyrics
- Sahiti Chaganti – vocals and vocal supervisor
- Sri Krishna – vocals
- DJ Harish – Koo Ku Ku Ku Koo mashup
- Osho V. Shashank – additional programmer
- Siddanth Mishra – additional programmer
- Sruthi – harmony
- Ranjani – harmony
- Pratyusha – harmony
- Vaagdevi – harmony
- Adviteeyaa – harmony
- Shruthika – harmony
- Anusha – harmony
- The Gongura Band – percussion
- Chiru – additional raw old tapes
- Ganesh – additional raw old tapes
- P Subhani – mandolin and strings
- Sandilya – low vio bows
- Lalit Kumar – flute
- Shadab Rayeen – mix engineer and mastering engineer
- Manigandan K – musicians co-ordinator
- Raghu Seenu – studio manager
- Sridhar – studio manager
- Raju Ranjith Lingam – studio assistant
- Pavan – studio assistant

== Charts ==
Weekly chat performance for "Kurchi Madathapetti"
Chart (2021–2022)	Peak position
India (Billboard)	1
UK Asian Music Chart (OCC)	17
