= Avunu 2 =

2015 film by Ravi Babu

Avunu Part 2
- First look poster
- Directed by: Ravi Babu
- Written by: Ravi Babu
- Produced by: Ravi Babu; D. Suresh Babu
- Starring: Poorna; Harshvardhan Rane; Sanjjana; Nikita Thukral
- Cinematography: N. Sudhakar Reddy
- Edited by: Marthand K. Venkatesh
- Music by: Shekar Chandra
- Production companies: Flying Frogs; Suresh Productions
- Distributed by: Suresh Movies
- Release date: 3 April 2015
- Running time: 107 minutes
- Country: India
- Language: Telugu

Avunu 2 is a 2015 Indian Telugu-language horror thriller film written, directed, and produced by Ravi Babu. A sequel to the 2012 film Avunu, the film stars Poorna and Harshvardhan Rane who reprise their roles from the original with a new cast including Sanjjana and Nikita Thukral. The story takes place immediately after the events of Avunu.

== Plot ==
With the past behind them, Mohini and Harsha decide to move from the suburbs and settle into a plush apartment in the heart of the city. Having left the spirit of Captain Raju in the suburbs and armed with a talisman around her neck, Mohini starts feeling safe in the new set up. Harsha and Mohini look forward to the long pending consummation of their marriage. They start living in the new flat, much to the annoyance of their neighbour, who constantly doubts anyone who enters their house and gets into verbal brawl as well.

Harsha, with his team, works in a lab & provides support to paranormal experiments done by a doctor, which shows how the spirit leaves the body and where does it go. Sanjana, a partner of Harsha, operates the Paranomal activity detector in his lab. Back home, Captain Raju starts finding a way to rape Mohini. He first tries to enter home during night and tries to undress Mohini but fails as soon as the spirit sees the chain in her neck. He then tries several times, specially when Mohini is bathing or dressing up for a party when she is in a position to remove the chain unknowingly, but in vain. After few unsuccessful attempts, the spirit plays a trick with washing machine and water tap and makes Mohini to call a plumber. Unexpectedly the chain around her neck detaches and she is in a search of pin to attach it. But unfortunately the chain falls behind the closet. Seeing this as a chance, the spirit of Captain Raju enters the plumber's body and starts haunting Mohini. Somehow she manages to get the chain and saves herself. At that moment Harsha with his friend come home. Mohini describes everything to Harsha and his friend. Harsha's friend calls in Sanjana to bring the detector. When Sanjana starts searching for Captain Raju's spirit with her detector she finds nothing. Harsha then persuades Mohini to take off her chain as he thinks this chain might be the reason why the spirit isn't showing up. Sanjana resumes her search in the upper house where she is locked in a room and gets brutally raped and killed by Captain Raju. The spirit then enters the body of Harsha and tries to rape Mohini, but the plan fails as Harsha's friend suddenly grabs him and Mohini gets hold of the chain. The rest of the story ends how Mohini saves Harsha, who is tied up by his friend, and herself from the spirit that is haunting her. The spirit somehow enters Harsha's friend's body and tries to molest Mohini. Harsha is back in his senses but is tied and unable to move. The neighbour gets alerted by the screams of Mohini and comes to save her and Harsha. On entering he finds that Harsha's friend is trying to rape Mohini on the dining table, and tries to stop him. Harsha quickly lowers the AI ceiling fan via his smartphone and the body of the spirit (Harsha's friend's body) gets injured and Mohini runs towards Harsha. The injured body of the spirit still tries to come near Mohini but is stopped by her neighbour until the clock turns 12'o clock, of Maha Shivratri, and the spirit is set free eternally. Mohini and Harsha manage to save themselves.

Back in the suburbs, the child of late Captain Raju asks his mother whether his father is awarded with Heaven or sentenced to Hell by God, which is laughed off by his uncle saying that Captain Raju deserves to rot in Hell. Few minutes after, his uncle is seen getting slapped by an unknown spirit, signifying that the spirit of Captain Raju is still there.

== Cast ==
- Poorna as Mohini
- Harshvardhan Rane as Harsha
- Ravi Babu as Captain Raju / Rajender Reddy
- Nikita Thukral as Swathi, Chakravarti's wife
- Ravi Varma Adduri as Chakravarthi, Harsha's neighbour
- Sanjjana as Sanjana
- Chalapati Rao as Harsha's father
- Delhi Rajeshwari as Harsha's mother
- Gayatri Bhargavi as Swapna
- Master Gaurav as Vicky
- Saraswathamma as Narrator
- Prabhas Sreenu as Captain Raju's brother-in-law
- Srinivas Sayee as Chakravarthi's neighbour
- Dr. Sudha as Yadamma

== Production ==
=== Casting ===
Harshvardhan Rane and Poorna played the lead roles in the film. They played the lead pair in the original version Avunu. Sanjjana played a scientist in the film.

== Reception ==
A critic from The Hindu called it a "predictable old fare".

== See also ==
- Avunu
