= Guntur Kaaram =

2024 Indian film by Trivikram Srinivas

- Theatrical release poster
- Directed by: Trivikram Srinivas
- Written by: Trivikram Srinivas
- Produced by: S. Radha Krishna
- Starring: Mahesh Babu; Jayaram; Ramya Krishna; Prakash Raj; Sreeleela; Meenakshi Chaudhary; Easwari Rao; Jagapathi Babu; Sunil; Rao Ramesh
- Cinematography: Manoj Paramahamsa; P. S. Vinod
- Edited by: Naveen Nooli
- Music by: Thaman S
- Production company: Haarika & Hassine Creations
- Release date: 12 January 2024
- Running time: 159 minutes
- Country: India
- Language: Telugu
- Budget: ₹200 crore
- Box office: est. ₹172–212 crore

Guntur Kaaram: Highly Inflammable (pronounced [ɡʊɳʈuːɾ kaːɾʌm]; transl. The Spice of Guntur) is a 2024 Indian Telugu-language action comedy drama film written and directed by Trivikram Srinivas and produced by S. Radha Krishna through Haarika & Hassine Creations. It features Mahesh Babu in the lead role, alongside Jayaram, Ramya Krishna, Prakash Raj, Sreeleela, Meenakshi Chaudhary, Easwari Rao, Jagapathi Babu, Sunil and Rao Ramesh.

The film was officially announced in May 2021 under the tentative title SSMB28, as it is Babu's 28th film in the leading role, and the official title was announced in May 2023. Principal photography commenced in September 2022, predominantly shot in Hyderabad, and wrapped by late-December 2023. The film's score and soundtrack are composed by Thaman S, with cinematography handled by Manoj Paramahamsa and editing handled by Naveen Nooli.

Guntur Kaaram was released in theatres worldwide on 12 January 2024, coinciding with Sankranti, to mixed-to-negative reviews from the critics and audience alike. Trivikram's direction and screenplay were highly criticized, while Babu's performance was unanimously acclaimed. It eventually grossed around 172-212 crores worldwide against its budget of ₹200 crores, becoming a below-average grosser.

== Plot ==
In 1998, a violent rivalry erupts in Guntur when rival factionists Dokka Marx Babu and Lenin Babu burn down Bhogineni Satyam's red-chili processing factory. During the ensuing melee, Satyam’s brother-in-law, Rangam, accidentally kills Lenin. To protect his family, Satyam takes the legal blame for the murder and is sentenced to 12 years in prison. In the factory explosion, Satyam’s young son, Veera Venkata Ramana, is permanently blinded in his left eye. Following the tragedy, Satyam's wife, Vasundhara, abruptly abandons the family and returns to Hyderabad, where she enters an arranged marriage with her cousin, Narayana.

Twenty-five years later, Vasundhara is appointed the Law Minister of Andhra Pradesh within the political party of her manipulative patriarch father, Vyra Venkata Swamy. As an upcoming election approaches, rival politician Kata Madhu uncovers Vasundhara's hidden past, threatening to expose Ramana's existence to destroy her political career. To neutralize the liability, Venkata Swamy demands that Ramana sign a legal disclaimer permanently severing all bloodline ties with Vasundhara in exchange for financial compensation. Ramana, now a hardened chilli trader in Guntur, repeatedly refuses to sign unless he can directly meet his mother. Venkata Swamy escalates the pressure by fabricating criminal charges against Ramana, leading to multiple violent confrontations between Ramana and his grandfather's enforcers.

When Ramana forces his way into a political rally to confront his mother, a defensive Vasundhara slaps him publicly and demands he leave. Devastated by her apparent coldness, Ramana signs the disclaimer. Seizing the chaos, Kata Madhu exposes Ramana’s lineage to the media anyway. Ramana subsequently visits his father, Satyam, who reveals a hidden truth: during his trial, Vasundhara had testified against her own husband, solidifying his wrongful conviction. Shortly after, Ramana survives an assassination attempt by a contract killer named "Gelatin" Babji. Babji reveals that the hit was orchestrated by Venkata Swamy and Narayana, who want Ramana permanently eliminated.

Simultaneously, Vasundhara is critically injured in a staged hit-and-run accident and hospitalized. Venkata Swamy misdirects a grieving Ramana, claiming that Kata Madhu and a local gang leader, Hari Das, orchestrated the accident. He manipulates Ramana into launching a retaliatory strike against them to protect his mother. In private, Venkata Swamy confesses to his lawyer, Paani, that he was the mastermind behind the 1998 factory arson; he had destroyed Satyam's business to blackmail and force his daughter away from her inter-caste marriage, which had previously cost him an election.

Ramana tracks down Hari Das, who reveals that he had no hand in the accident. Instead, Hari Das exposes a deeper conspiracy: Venkata Swamy and Narayana orchestrated the assassination attempt on Vasundhara themselves to generate a massive political sympathy wave before the elections.

Ramana storms an elite political event meant to introduce Raj Gopal, Vasundhara and Narayana's son, as the party's new parliamentary candidate. There, a cornered Narayana reveals the final truth to Venkata Swamy: Raj Gopal is an adopted child. Vasundhara had faked the pregnancy and maintained a completely celibate, separate marriage with Narayana solely to appease her father and prevent him from hunting down and killing her biological son, Ramana. Her testimony against Satyam had also been a desperate bargain to keep Ramana alive under her father's surveillance.

Enraged by the decades of structural manipulation, Ramana prepares to violently dismantle his grandfather's political empire. However, a recovering Vasundhara intervenes, requesting that he choose familial peace over further bloodshed. Leaving Venkata Swamy politically isolated and disgraced, Vasundhara renounces her ministry. She returns with Ramana to Guntur, where she finally reunites with Satyam, repairing the family broken twenty-five years prior.

== Cast ==
- Mahesh Babu as Bhogineni Veera Venkata Ramana alias "Rowdy" Ramana, Satyam and Vasundhara's son
- Jayaram as Bhogineni Satyanarayana alias "Royal" Satyam, Vasundhara's first husband and Ramana's father, Guntur Kaaram factory owner (voice dubbed by P. Ravi Shankar)
- Ramya Krishna as Law Minister Vyra Vasundhara, Venkata Swamy's daughter; Ramana's mother and Gopal's adoptive mother; Bhogineni Satyam's ex-wife and Raja Gopal Narayana's wife
- Prakash Raj as Vyra Venkata Swamy, Vasundhara's father and Ramana's grandfather
- Jagapathi Babu as Dokka Marx Babu, Lenin's brother and Satyam's rival
- Sunil as Dokka Lenin Babu, Marx's elder brother
- Rao Ramesh as Pakka Rajagopal "Gopal" Narayana, Vasundhara's second husband; Ramana's stepfather and Gopal's adoptive father
- Murali Sharma as Adv. Basavaraju Sarangapaani "Paani", Ammu's father and Venkata Swamy's attorney
- Sreeleela as Basavaraju Aamukta Malyada "Ammu", Paani's daughter and Ramana's love interest
- Meenakshi Chaudhary as Raji, Ramana's cousin
- Poorna in a special appearance as Ramola in the song "Kurchi Madathapetti"
- Rahul Ravindran as Vyra Raja Gopal, Vasundhara and Narayana's adopted son and Ramana's adoptive half-brother
- Ajay as Gelatin Babji, blind contract killer
- Vennela Kishore as Balasubramanyam "Balu", Paani's assistant
- Easwari Rao as Bujji, Satyam's sister; Rangam's wife; Samba and Raji's mother; Ramana's aunt
- Ajay Ghosh as Hari Das
- P. Ravi Shankar as Kata Madhu, Venkata Swamy's rival, opposition leader
- Brahmaji as CI Aadhinarayana
- Raghu Babu as Rangam, Bujji's husband; Satyam's brother-in-law and Ramana's uncle
- Madhusudhan Rao as fake Hari Das
- Pammi Sai as Yakob
- Teja Kakumanu as Samba, Rangam and Bujji's son; Raji's brother and Ramana's cousin
- Mahesh Achanta as Lenin's son and Marx's nephew
- Gopiraju Vijay as Ramana's uncle
- Surabhi Prabhavathi
- Manik Reddy as Mohammed
- Vamsee Chaganti
- Chammak Chandra as Constable Mohammed, Rajagopal's assistant
- RJ Hemanth
- Kadambari Kiran Kumar as a doctor

== Production ==
=== Development ===
In early April 2021, it was reported that Trivikram Srinivas, who had successful collaborations with both Mahesh Babu and Pooja Hegde after working with the former in Athadu (2005) and Khaleja (2010); the latter in Aravinda Sametha Veera Raghava (2018) and Ala Vaikunthapurramuloo (2020), would collaborate with both Babu and Hegde for his next directorial before his venture with N. T. Rama Rao Jr. He reportedly had narrated the script before the final script works which impressed the actor and actress and made them agree to work on the venture, in their third respective collaboration with the director. On 1 May, the collaboration of Babu and Trivikram was officially announced, under the tentative title SSMB28. Production was set to begin in November 2021 as Babu reportedly finished filming by then for Sarkaru Vaari Paata (2022). Trivikram repeated his norm technicians from Aravinda Sametha Veera Raghava and Ala Vaikunthapurramuloo: cinematographer P. S. Vinod, editor Naveen Nooli, music composer Thaman S, and art director A.S. Prakash, were finalised as the technical crew. The film was bankrolled by S. Radha Krishna, under Haarika & Hassine Creations.

A muhurtam pooja ceremony was held on 3 February 2022 at Ramanaidu Studios in Hyderabad with the film's cast and crew. The film was initially promoted as an action thriller. However, after the completion of the first schedule, reports surfaced about conflicts among crew members and the cast. Subsequently, the production of the film was paused, and the script was reworked. After several months of delay, Trivikram presented a new modified script that transformed the film into a family entertainer, departing from the original narrative as an action thriller. The sequences filmed during the first schedule, including fight sequences choreographed by Anbariv, were intended to be discarded. The shooting recommenced with action sequences as per the modifications done to the script.

=== Casting ===
Pooja Hegde was initially cast as the lead actress, paired opposite Babu for the second time after Maharshi (2019) as well as in her third collaboration with director, however due to her schedule conflicts, she opted out from the venture and was subsequently replaced by Sreeleela. The latter was initially signed on to play the second actress role before Hegde opted out, however after that, Sreeleela took over the lead actress role and the second role was replaced by Meenakshi Chaudhary. In February 2023, Ramya Krishna was selected to play a key role in the film. In March, Prakash Raj joined the cast to play Mahesh Babu's grandfather in the film. Later Jayaram joined the cast. In April, Jagapathi Babu was reported to play "a very endearing yet scary" character.

=== Filming ===
Principal photography commenced on 12 September 2022 with an action sequence in Annapurna Studios, Hyderabad. The first schedule, involving high-octane stunts choreographed by Anbariv duo, was later completed in the same month. However it was later confirmed by the producers that the fight was scrapped. The second schedule was planned to commence after Dussehra festivities in Ramoji Film City with Hegde joining the sets. The shooting was then halted with Trivikram making modifications to the script and converted the action thriller film into a "family entertainer".

The second schedule started on 18 January 2023 in Sarathi Studios, Hyderabad. Hegde joined the sets with filming taking place in Hyderabad. In February, team constructed a house set spending ₹10 crore at Shankarpalli, Telangana in Hyderabad. In March, Jayaram joined the sets. The second schedule was wrapped on 6 April. After shooting more than 50% of the film, the cinematographer of the film, P. S. Vinod, left, owing to creative differences. Following this development, Manoj Paramahamsa was announced as his replacement for the film. The third schedule began on 24 June. Principal photography wrapped on 28 December 2023.

== Music ==
Thaman S. composed the soundtrack album and background score for the film, in his fifth collaboration with Babu after Dookudu (2011), Businessman (2012), Aagadu (2014), and Sarkaru Vaari Paata (2022); third collaboration with Trivikram after Aravinda Sametha Veera Raghava (2018) and Ala Vaikunthapurramuloo (2020).

== Release ==
=== Theatrical ===
Guntur Kaaram was released worldwide in theatres on 12 January 2024. Originally intended for a theatrical release on 28 April 2023, the film's launch was first deferred to 11 August 2023, and then to 13 January 2024, coinciding with Sankranti. Eventually, the release date was advanced to 12 January 2024.

=== Marketing ===
On 31 May 2023, first glimpse was released, on the occasion of Babu's father Krishna's 80th birth anniversary, which was attached with Mosagallaku Mosagadu 4K re-release in theatres. The film's official trailer was released on 7 January 2024.

=== Home media ===
The film digital distribution rights were acquired by Netflix and premiered from 9 February 2024 in Telugu, Tamil, Malayalam, Kannada and Hindi.

== Reception ==
=== Critical reception ===
The film received generally negative reviews from critics criticising its direction, screenplay and plot, but praised for Babu's performance, background score and soundtrack.

Anandu Suresh of The Indian Express gave 2/5 stars and wrote "Mahesh Babu, in top-notch form, is the sole redeeming factor in Trivikram's unnecessarily prolonged film, preventing it from becoming a tedious watch." BVS Prakash from Deccan Chronicle gave 2/5 stars and wrote "director Trivikram Srinvas fails to come up with a solid script to justify the larger-than-life image of Mahesh Babu." Abhilasha Cherukuri of Cinema Express gave 2/5 stars and wrote "the film was a two-and-half hour-long advertisement for the Vijayawada-Hyderabad expressway. Not to mention additional brand placements for Greater Hyderabad's outer ring road. Outside of an expansive B-roll displaying well-maintained roads in not one but two Telugu states, the rest of Guntur Kaaram is mere filler."

Neeshita Nyayapati of Hindustan Times called it a "bland film" and wrote "Guntur Kaaram feels like a wasted opportunity. The film could’ve either been a tearjerker or a commercial masala film, but the way it is now, it just hangs in an unsatisfactory limbo. And that's a shame because Mahesh gives the film his all. If only Trivikram could break out of the box he seems to have created for himself." Reviewing the film, Sangeetha Devi Dundoo of The Hindu wrote "Director Trivikram Srinivas and Mahesh Babu’s ‘Guntur Kaaram’ is a stale rehash of old stories".

=== Box office ===
Guntur Kaaram collected a gross of ₹142 crore (US$15 million) in India and ₹47 crore worldwide on its opening day. It's estimated total end worldwide gross is ₹212 crore against a production budget of ₹200 crore (US$21 million), becoming a below average grosser.
