= SIIMA Award for Best Actress – Telugu =

Telugu-language media award

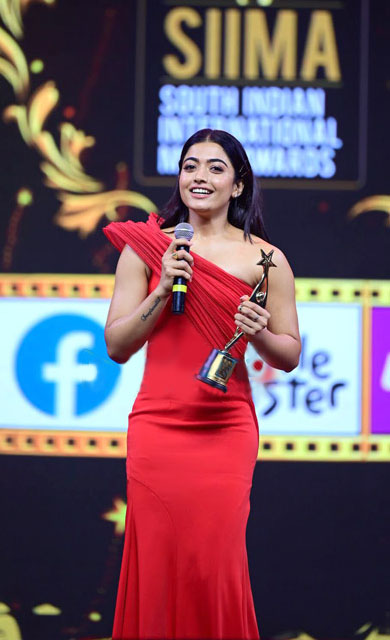
- The 2026 recipient: Rashmika Mandanna
- Awarded for: Best Performance by an Actress in a Leading Role in Telugu cinema
- Country: India
- Presented by: Vibri Media Group
- First award: 21 June 2012 (for films released in 2011)
- Most recent winner: Rashmika Mandanna, The Girlfriend (2025)

Highlights
- Most wins: Shruti Haasan (3)
- Most nominations: Samantha (9)

SIIMA Award for Best Actress – Telugu is presented by Vibri media group as part of its annual South Indian International Movie Awards, for best acting done by an actress in Telugu films. The award was first given in 2012 for films released in 2011. Shruti Haasan is the most awarded with three wins and Samantha Ruth Prabhu is the most nominated with nine nominations.

== Superlatives ==
Categories	Recipient	Record
Most wins	Shruti Haasan	3
Most consecutive wins	Pooja Hegde	2 (2020–2021)
Most consecutive wins	Shruti Haasan	2 (2014–2015)
Most nominations	Samantha	9
Most consecutive nominations	Samantha	6 (2011–2016)
Oldest winner	Kajal Aggarwal	Age 33 (7th SIIMA)
Youngest winner	Sreeleela	Age 22 (11th SIIMA)
Oldest nominee	Deepika Padukone	Age 39 (13th SIIMA)
Youngest nominee	Hansika Motwani	Age 20 (1st SIIMA)

- Shruti Haasan is the only actress to have also won the SIIMA Award for Best Female Debut – Telugu.

== Multiple winners ==
Wins	Recipient(s)
3	Shruti Hasan
2	Samantha, Pooja Hegde, Keerthy Suresh, Rashmika Mandanna

=== Multiple nominations ===
Nominations	Recipient(s)
9	Samantha
6	Shruti Haasan
5	Kajal Aggarwal, Rashmika Mandanna
3	Anushka Shetty, Nayanthara, Nithya Menen, Rakul Preet Singh, Pooja Hegde
2	Tamannaah Bhatia, Sai Pallavi, Sreeleela, Keerthy Suresh, Meenakshi Chaudhary, Mrunal Thakur

== Winners and nominees ==
Table key
‡	Indicates the winner

=== 2010s ===
Year	Actress	Film	Ref.
2011 (1st)	Nayanthara ‡	Sri Rama Rajyam	
2011 (1st)	Samantha	Dookudu	
2011 (1st)	Kajal Aggarwal	Mr. Perfect	
2011 (1st)	Hansika Motwani	Kandireega	
2011 (1st)	Tamannaah Bhatia	100% Love	
2012 (2nd)	Shruti Haasan ‡	Gabbar Singh	
2012 (2nd)	Nayanthara	Krishnam Vande Jagadgurum	
2012 (2nd)	Kajal Aggarwal	Businessman	
2012 (2nd)	Samantha	Eega	
2013 (3rd)	Samantha ‡	Attarintiki Daredi	
2013 (3rd)	Shruti Haasan	Balupu	
2013 (3rd)	Nithya Menen	Gunde Jaari Gallanthayyinde	
2013 (3rd)	Tamannaah Bhatia	Tadakha	
2013 (3rd)	Kajal Aggarwal	Baadshah	
2014 (6th)	Shruti Haasan ‡	Race Gurram	
2014 (6th)	Nayanthara	Anamika	
2014 (6th)	Rakul Preet Singh	Loukyam	
2014 (6th)	Kajal Aggarwal	Govindudu Andarivadele	
2014 (6th)	Samantha	Manam	
2015 (5th)	Shruti Haasan ‡	Srimanthudu	
2015 (5th)	Nithya Menen	Malli Malli Idi Rani Roju	
2015 (5th)	Anushka Shetty	Rudramadevi	
2015 (5th)	Lakshmi Manchu	Dongata	
2015 (5th)	Samantha	S/O Satyamurthy	
2016 (6th)	Rakul Preet Singh ‡	Nannaku Prematho	
2016 (6th)	Lavanya Tripathi	Srirastu Subhamastu	
2016 (6th)	Regena Cassandrra	Jo Achyutananda	
2016 (6th)	Ritu Varma	Pelli Choopulu	
2016 (6th)	Samantha	A Aa	
2017 (7th)	Kajal Aggarwal ‡	Nene Raju Nene Mantri	
2017 (7th)	Anushka Shetty	Baahubali 2: The Conclusion	
2017 (7th)	Rakul Preet Singh	Jaya Janaki Nayaka	
2017 (7th)	Sai Pallavi	Fidaa	
2018 (8th)	Keerthy Suresh ‡	Mahanati	
2018 (8th)	Aditi Rao Hydari	Sammohanam	
2018 (8th)	Anushka Shetty	Bhaagamathie	
2018 (8th)	Rashmika Mandanna	Geetha Govindam	
2018 (8th)	Samantha	Rangasthalam	
2019 (9th)	Samantha ‡	Oh! Baby	
2019 (9th)	Pooja Hegde	Maharshi	
2019 (9th)	Shraddha Srinath	Jersey	
2019 (9th)	Rashmika Mandanna	Dear Comrade	
2019 (9th)	Raashii Khanna	Prati Roju Pandage	

=== 2020s ===
Year	Actress	Film	Ref.
2020 (9th)	Pooja Hegde ‡	Ala Vaikunthapurramuloo	
2020 (9th)	Rashmika Mandanna	Sarileru Neekevvaru	
2020 (9th)	Chandini Chowdary	Colour Photo	
2020 (9th)	Nabha Natesh	Solo Brathuke So Better	
2020 (9th)	Aishwarya Rajesh	World Famous Lover	
2021 (10th)	Pooja Hegde ‡	Most Eligible Bachelor	
2021 (10th)	Sai Pallavi	Love Story	
2021 (10th)	Rashmika Mandanna	Pushpa: The Rise	
2021 (10th)	Shruti Haasan	Krack	
2021 (10th)	Priyamani	Narappa	
2021 (10th)	Pragya Jaiswal	Akhanda	
2022 (11th)	Sreeleela ‡	Dhamaka	
2022 (11th)	Meenakshi Chaudhary	HIT: The Second Case	
2022 (11th)	Mrunal Thakur	Sita Ramam	
2022 (11th)	Neha Shetty	DJ Tillu	
2022 (11th)	Nithya Menen	Bheemla Nayak	
2022 (11th)	Samantha	Yashoda	
2023 (12th)	Keerthy Suresh ‡	Dasara	
2023 (12th)	Mrunal Thakur	Hi Nanna	
2023 (12th)	Payal Rajput	Mangalavaaram	
2023 (12th)	Samyuktha	Virupaksha	
2023 (12th)	Shruti Haasan	Veera Simha Reddy	
2023 (12th)	Sreeleela	Bhagavanth Kesari	
2024 (13th)	Rashmika Mandanna ‡	Pushpa 2: The Rule	
2024 (13th)	Anupama Parameswaran	Tillu Square	
2024 (13th)	Ashika Ranganath	Naa Saami Ranga	
2024 (13th)	Deepika Padukone	Kalki 2898 AD	
2024 (13th)	Meenakshi Chaudhary	Lucky Baskhar	
2024 (13th)	Nivetha Thomas	35 Chinna Katha Kaadu	

== See also ==
- SIIMA Critics Award for Best Actress – Telugu
- SIIMA Award for Best Female Debut – Telugu
