= Geetha Govindam (soundtrack) =

Soundtrack album by Gopi Sundar
- Released: 29 July 2018
- Recorded: 2018
- Genre: Feature film soundtrack
- Length: 16:56
- Language: Telugu
- Label: Aditya Music
- Producer: Gopi Sundar

Gopi Sundar chronology
Pantham (2018)	Geetha Govindam (2018)	Sailaja Reddy Alludu (2018)
External audio
- Audio Jukebox on YouTube

Singles from Geetha Govindam
- 1. "Inkem Inkem Inkem Kaavale" Released: 10 July 2018

Geetha Govindam is the soundtrack album to the 2018 film of the same name directed by Parasuram and stars Vijay Deverakonda and Rashmika Mandanna. The album featured six songs composed by Gopi Sundar and lyrics written by Anantha Sriram, Sri Mani and Sagar. It was preceded by "Inkem Inkem Inkem Kaavale" as the first single on 10 July 2018, and the soundtrack was released on 29 July under the Aditya Music label. The soundtrack was positively received by critics and listeners at Sid Sriram won the Best Male Playback Singer – Telugu for the song "Inkem Inkem Inkem Kaavale" while the album won the Favorite Album of the Year.

== Background and release ==
The film's soundtrack was composed and produced by Gopi Sundar, and featured lyrics written by Anantha Sriram, Sri Mani and Sagar. Actor Vijay Deverakonda, made his singing debut through this film.

The makers unveiled the first single "Inkem Inkem Inkem Kaavaale" on 10 July 2018. The song upon its release, its lyrical video crossed 1 million views in YouTube. Within a day after its release, the song received few covers, including a reprise version and a dubsmash. The album was released on 29 July 2018, at an event held at JRC Convention Centre, Film Nagar, Hyderabad, with Allu Arjun becoming the chief guest. The jukebox which was released in YouTube and other platforms during the launch, received 1 million views upon release.

The sneak peek of the song, earlier titled "What the F" which was released before the audio launch, featured behind-the-scenes footage, with choreography by Jani. However, it received backlash due to the objectionable lyrics, prompting the makers to change the title, to "What The Life". The initial video being deleted from YouTube.

== Reception ==
Writing for The Times of India, Neetishta Nyayapati stated "The album of 'Geetha Govindam' as a whole offers three strong songs and two subpar ones" and chose "Inkem Inkem", "Yenti Yenti" and "Vachindamma" as her favorite picks. Karthik Srinivasan of Milliblog wrote "After Pantham, Gopi seems to be finding his mojo in Telugu again." Priyanka Sundar of Hindustan Times wrote "The songs composed by Gopi Sundar in the film are beautiful, memorable and make a mark with harmony. The music goes hand-in-hand with the emotions that the actors portray on screen. It ranges between anger, love, lust and comedy; and Gopi has managed to bring all of these emotions to life with his back ground score."

Sangeetha Devi Dundoo of The Hindu wrote "Gopi Sundar's music works beautifully for the narrative, with Sid Sriram's ' Inkem inkem inkem kaavaale ' growing into a new earworm." Murali Krishna C. H. of The New Indian Express wrote "Gopi Sundar's music brings life to the film and the much-talked-about Inkem...inkem kavali...was picturised well, so were other numbers."

== Track listing ==
No.	Title	Lyrics	Singer(s)	Length
1.	"Inkem Inkem Inkem Kaavaale"	Ananta Sriram	Sid Sriram	4:27
2.	"What the Life"	Sri Mani	Vijay Deverakonda	3:03
3.	"Vachindamma"	Sri Mani	Sid Sriram	4:10
4.	"Yenti Yenti"	Sri Mani	Chinmayi	2:34
5.	"Kanureppala Kaalam"	Sagar	Gopi Sundar	2:42
6.	"Tanemandhe Tanemandhe"	Ananta Sriram	Anurag Kulkarni	1:35

== Awards and nominations ==
Date of ceremony	Award	Category	Recipient(s) and nominee(s)	Result	Ref.
6 January 2019	Zee Cine Awards Telugu	Favorite Album of the Year	Gopi Sundar	Won	
15–16 August 2019	South Indian International Movie Awards	Best Music Director – Telugu	Gopi Sundar	Nominated	
15–16 August 2019	South Indian International Movie Awards	Best Lyricist – Telugu	Ananta Sriram – ("Inkem Inkem Inkem Kaavaale")	Nominated	
15–16 August 2019	South Indian International Movie Awards	Best Male Playback Singer – Telugu	Sid Sriram – ("Inkem Inkem Inkem Kaavaale")	Nominated	
15–16 August 2019	South Indian International Movie Awards	Best Female Playback Singer – Telugu	Chinmayi – ("Yenti Yenti")	Nominated	
21 December 2019	Filmfare Awards South	Best Music Director – Telugu	Gopi Sundar	Nominated	
21 December 2019	Filmfare Awards South	Best Lyricist – Telugu	Ananta Sriram – ("Inkem Inkem Inkem Kaavaale")	Nominated	
21 December 2019	Filmfare Awards South	Best Male Playback Singer – Telugu	Sid Sriram – ("Inkem Inkem Inkem Kaavaale")	Won	
21 December 2019	Filmfare Awards South	Best Female Playback Singer – Telugu	Chinmayi – ("Yenti Yenti")	Nominated	
