= The Family Star =

2024 Indian film by Parasuram

- Theatrical release poster
- Directed by: Parasuram
- Written by: Parasuram
- Produced by: Dil Raju; Sirish
- Starring: Vijay Deverakonda; Mrunal Thakur
- Cinematography: K. U. Mohanan
- Edited by: Marthand K. Venkatesh
- Music by: Gopi Sundar
- Production company: Sri Venkateswara Creations
- Release date: 5 April 2024
- Running time: 157 minutes
- Country: India
- Language: Telugu
- Budget: ₹50 crore
- Box office: ₹28 crore

The Family Star is a 2024 Indian Telugu-language romantic action comedy film written and directed by Parasuram, and produced by Dil Raju and Sirish under Sri Venkateswara Creations. The film features Vijay Deverakonda and Mrunal Thakur in lead roles.

The film was officially announced in February 2023 under the tentative title VD13 and the official title was announced in October 2023. Principal photography commenced in July 2023. It was shot sporadically in several legs, with filming locations including Hyderabad and New York. The film has music composed by Gopi Sundar.

Family Star was initially scheduled to release on Sankranthi 2024, but it was postponed as filming was delayed due to visa issues and not going to be completed in time The Family Star received mixed-to-negative reviews from critics. While Parasuram's writing, plot, and direction were criticized, the lead cast's performances and the soundtrack were mostly praised or at least considered adequate, and the comedy received mixed reviews. The film was a failure at the box office grossing ₹28 crore worldwide against a budget of ₹50 crore.

== Plot ==
A woman named Indu sadly sits in the middle of a ceremony. When she is questioned about her unusual behavior, she tells her past.

Past: Govardhan is a family man. As a selfless character, he works in a business to provide for his family. He also faces trouble with his drunkard brother. However, he meets Indu when she moves into his "space", which is a room upstairs that Govardhan used. That too, Indu and his family quickly become friends. Soon, they both fall in love. After a big incident, he reconciles with his brother after his mother reveals to Indu that his brother hated him because of Govardhan shaming him. However, when he finds her thesis on his family and him for a college project, he slaps her and vows to teach her a lesson. He goes to Keshu, a previous job offeror, requests to join the company, and asks for a big advance. He uses that advance to defy whatever Indu has written in her thesis. However, it is revealed that Indu is Keshu's daughter. Though annoyed, he continues in the company but demands everything Indu gets. After learning that his flight tickets were not paid for, he resorts to Indu, who provides money for his family. After falling in love again, she hears him talking to a lady negatively about Indu, saying that she is not the right person for him. Heartbroken, Indu isolates herself from him. After revealing that she heard him that day, she leaves him.

Present: Govardhan finds out Indu's true intentions of writing the thesis from her father and proceeds to stop her from a wedding, held for one person who got injured due to Govardhan and (according to the person's grandfather, a famous politician) would be the only thing to make him feel better. It is revealed that Indu is at that wedding. Govardhan defeats the politician's goons along with his grandmother, wins back Indu, and marries her at the end.

== Cast ==
- Vijay Deverakonda as Govardhan
- Mrunal Thakur as Indu Dhanaraj, CEO of Indu Infra Company
- Jagapathi Babu as Keshu Dhanraj, Indu's father and head of Indu Infra Company
- Divyansha Kaushik as Govardhan's colleague (cameo appearance)
- Vennela Kishore as Samarth, Indu's assistant
- Ravi Prakash as Govardhan's elder brother
- Raja Chembolu as Govardhan's elder brother
- Vasuki Anand as Manju, Govardhan's sister-in-law
- Abhinaya as Govardhan's sister-in-law
- Rohini Hattangadi as Govardhan's grandmother
- Ravi Babu as Loan Shark
- VTV Ganesh as Ramesh, HR of Indu Infra Company
- Prabhas Sreenu as Govardhan's friend
- Achyuth Kumar as Politician
- Ajay Ghosh as a rowdy
- Kalyani Natarajan as Wedding Auntie
- Jabardasth Ramprasad as Petrol Bunk Guy
- Nanajee Karri as Delivery Boy
- Kishore Vasistha as Office Staff

== Production ==
=== Development ===
On 6 February 2023, Vijay Deverakonda, who had a successful collaboration with director Parasuram after Geetha Govindam (2018), was announced to join hands with the latter for his directorial venture after Sarkaru Vaari Paata (2022). Sri Venkateswara Creations, headed jointly by Dil Raju and Sirish, would reportedly produce the venture. The company made a public announcement on 14 June, confirming the project. Tentatively titled VD13, a muhurat puja was held on that week with the presence of the film's cast and crew. The presence of Devarakonda and actress Mrunal Thakur revealed their inclusion. Shortly after the beginning of the principal photography, Divyansha Kaushik was announced to play as a second lead actress. The official title, The Family Star, was speculated in June 2023 and was announced in October 2023.

=== Filming ===
Principal photography began with the first schedule on 15 July 2023. The first schedule was held in Hyderabad, where they also celebrated Thakur's birthday on 2 August. In late December, the third schedule began in New York.

== Music ==
The Family Star

Soundtrack album by Gopi Sundar
- Released: 5 April 2024
- Genre: Feature film soundtrack
- Length: 22:12
- Language: Telugu
- Label: T-Series

Gopi Sundar chronology
Kadakan (2024)	The Family Star (2024)	Aa Okkati Adakku (2024)

The music and background score is composed by Gopi Sundar, in his third collaboration with Vijay after Geetha Govindam (2018) and World Famous Lover (2020); second with Parasuram after Geetha Govindam. The first single "Nandanandana" was released on 8 February 2024. This was followed by "Kalyani Vaccha Vacchaa," which was released on 12 March 2024. The third single "Madhuramu Kadha" was unveiled on 25 March 2024.

No.	Title	Lyrics	Singer(s)	Length
1.	"Nandanandana"	Anantha Sriram	Sid Sriram	4:59
2.	"Kalyani Vaccha Vacchaa"	Anantha Sriram	Mangli, Karthik	3:21
3.	"Madhuramu Kadha"	Sri Mani	Shreya Ghoshal	4:09
4.	"Dekho Re Dekho"	Anantha Sriram	Hemachandra	3:18
5.	"Don't Judge Me"	MaaHaa	MaaHaa	6:25
Total length:				22:12

== Release ==
=== Home media ===
The digital streaming rights of the film were acquired by Amazon Prime Video and premiered 26 April 2024 in Telugu, Malayalam and Tamil languages.

== Critical reception ==
The Family Star received mixed-to-negative reviews from critics. While Parasuram's writing, plot, and direction were criticized, the lead cast's performances and the soundtrack were mostly praised or at least considered adequate, and the comedy received mixed reviews. On the review aggregator website Rotten Tomatoes, 0% of 7 critics' reviews are positive, with an average rating of 4/10. A critic from News18 rated the film 3.5/5 stars and wrote "Vijay Deverakonda, Mrunal Thakur Shine in Perfect Family Entertainer. Vijay Deverakonda and Mrunal Thakur's solid on-screen chemistry receives much love and appreciation from the audience" . Suhasini Srihari from Deccan Chronicle gave it 3/5 stars and praised the acting in the film "All the actors manage to deliver their best. Mrunal’s performance is subtle and convincing while Deverakonda is over the top sometimes", while describing the film this way "This film is meant for a niche audience who enjoy hearty family dramas. It is formulaic and the execution is weak. Despite its flaws, Family Star is watchable if you like the genre of family entertainers." T.A. Kiran Kumar of Zee News Telugu rated the film 2.75/5, describing it as a moderately impressive family star. He praised Vijay Deverakonda and Mrunal Thakur's performances, the first half, and the production values, while noting that the second half lagged and some emotional scenes were less effective.

Paul Nicodemus from The Times of India rated the film 2.5/5 stars and wrote that "Family Star, despite its promising setup and strong performances, ultimately falters due to its unengaging screenplay and lack of emotional depth in key relationships", while also saying that Vijay and Mrunal shone in the film. Avad Mohammad from OTTplay rated the film 2.5/5 stars and wrote that "On the whole, Family Star is a routine romantic drama with a decent first half. The second half goes for a toss and leaves the audience disappointed. A few family-oriented scenes are good, and the film might cater to the target audience this holiday season". Jalapathy Gudellia of Telugucinema.com rated it 2.5/5 stars and wrote "Family Star draws in us in the first half with its enthralling romance between the lead pair and a well-executed plot twist at the interval. But the slow-paced narrative and excessively lengthy runtime in the second half undo everything", while praising the production's design&values and the cinematography. Neeshita Nyayapati from the Hindustan Times wrote that "Family Star could’ve been a simple, earnest film about a man taking up the responsibility of a massive family and finding love".

Raghu Bandi from The Indian Express rated the film 2/5 and wrote that "Given the film is designed as a blockbuster with Dil Raju producing, the middle-class sensibilities often slip, revealing it to be the big extravaganza it was always meant to be". Janani K from India Today rated the film 2/5 stars and wrote that "The Family Star is enjoyable in parts, thanks to Vijay Deverakonda's camaraderie with his grandmother and a few funny sequences. However, its pacing and conflict could have lifted the film to another level". Arjun Menon of Rediff.com rated it 2/5 stars and observed, "There is only so much that Vijay Deverakonda is allowed to work on from a clueless script that bounces from one wrong choice to another." A critic from Sakshi Post rated the film 2/5 stars and wrote that "Watch it at your own risk. Outdated and annoying the film is".

Abhilasha Cherukuri from Cinema Express rated the film 1.5/5 stars and wrote that "Despite its assembly line of shortcomings, Family Star could have still critic-proofed its way to success, had the makers taken the film a bit more seriously". Balakrishna Ganeshan from The News Minute gave the film the 1.5/5 stars and wrote that "Overall, Vijay Deverakonda’s Family Star is headache-inducing if not triggering". Sangeetha Devi Dundoo from The Hindu wrote that "Family Star does no justice to the family quotient or the star material. It is an interesting idea to raise a toast to the star of every middle-class family but that idea is lost in a film that gets progressively boring and tests your patience".
