= Ranabaali =

2026 Indian film by Rahul Sankrityan

- Theatrical release poster
- Directed by: Rahul Sankrityan
- Written by: Rahul Sankrityan; Pramod Tammineni
- Produced by: Naveen Yerneni; Yalamanchili Ravi Shankar
- Starring: Vijay Deverakonda; Rashmika Mandanna; Arnold Vosloo
- Cinematography: Nirav Shah; Jishnu Bhattacharjee
- Edited by: Karthika Srinivas
- Music by: Ajay-Atul
- Production companies: Mythri Movie Makers; T-Series Films
- Distributed by: see below
- Release date: 16 October 2026
- Running time: 178 minutes
- Country: India
- Language: Telugu
- Budget: ₹120 crore
- Box office: ₹80–81.10 crore

Ranabaali is a 2026 Indian Telugu-language period action drama film directed by Rahul Sankrityan and produced by Mythri Movie Makers and presented by T-Series Films. The film stars Vijay Deverakonda in the titular role, alongside Rashmika Mandanna and Arnold Vosloo. Set against the backdrop of the violent history of 19th century India, the film tells the story of a "Savage" who rises up against British colonial rule.

The film was officially announced in 9 May 2024 under the tentative title VD14, as it is the actor's 14th film in a leading role. Principal photography for this film began on 12 March 2026, and wrapped on 17 September 2026, spanning a total of approximately 130 days. The film has music composed by Ajay-Atul, cinematography handled by Nirav Shah and Jishnu Bhattacharjee, and editing by Karthika Srinivas.

Ranabaali was theatrically released on 16 October 2026 to highly negative reviews criticizing Deverakonda's authenticity in portraying a warrior from another region in Andhra Pradesh, the excessive violence, screenplay, editing, and background score. The film is a box office disaster.

== Plot ==
This film is told from the narrative of a Burra-Katha in the town of Singanamala.

Set in the Rayalaseema region of southern India during the 19th century British Raj, Ranabaali follows Singanamala Bobbili Ranabaali, who was born under mysterious circumstances, and according to a spiritual prophecy, the child has a predetermined purpose and is destined to live only until he fulfils his mission. As he grows up, Ranabaali becomes a formidable warrior and eventually marries Jayamma, whose presence reveals a gentler side to his otherwise fierce personality. Meanwhile, Rayalaseema is devastated by a severe famine, corresponding to the Great Famine of 1876–1878. The local population struggles with drought, food shortages and oppressive colonial taxation. British officials continue collecting revenue and seek to export grain produced in the region despite the growing suffering of its inhabitants.

Sir Theodore Hector, a senior British colonial official overseeing the region, pursues an ambitious plan to increase grain exports to Britain. His policies intensify the crisis, placing the interests of the colonial administration above the survival of the local population. Disturbed by the suffering of his people, Ranabaali challenges the colonial authorities and vows to stop the export of food supplies. His resistance develops into an armed rebellion against the British administration, transforming him from a regional warrior into a symbol of defiance against colonial exploitation.

As the conflict escalates, Ranabaali's struggle places increasing pressure on his relationship with Jayamma. His prolonged absence and commitment to the rebellion cause distress within their marriage. Jayamma subsequently learns the truth behind the prophecy associated with her husband's birth, revealing the deeper significance of his existence and his mission. The conflict ultimately centres on Ranabaali's efforts to protect his homeland, prevent the continued exploitation of its resources and bring the British authorities responsible for the famine to account. The story combines historical events with fictional characters, supernatural elements and a narrative of resistance against colonial rule.

== Cast ==
- Vijay Deverakonda as Singanamala Bobbili Ranabaali
- Rashmika Mandanna as Jayamma, Ranabaali’s wife
- Arnold Vosloo as Sir Theodore Hector, British Empire officer in charge of Madras
- Lal as Bhadra Mallanna Swamy Thatha
- Easwari Rao as Ranabaali’s mother
- Sheela Rajkumar as Alivelu
- Luke McGibney as Robert Multhus, chief revenue officer/tax collector
- Vladimir Angelove as Major Fredrick
- Benedict Garrett as Duke Redbone
- Zachary Coffin as Nicholson
- Geoffrey Giuliano as the Viceroy of India
- Raja Ravindra as Varma
- Mime Madhu as Prathapa
- Vinod Sagar as Easwar
- Edward J. Marsh as the Army Chaplain
- Jason Shah as Clive
- Artur Sorokin as a soldier
- Waqar Khan
- Francisco Raymond
- Andrew Sloman
- Nikita Vlatali
- John Augustin
- Rudra Thippeswamy
- V. M. Mahalingam as Burra Katha artist narrating about Ranabaali
- Kittu Chilamakuru as Leader at the Port

== Production ==
=== Development ===
In May 2024, production company Mythri Movie Makers released a poster announcing a collaboration with actor Vijay Deverakonda for a film tentatively titled VD14. This is the 14th film to star Deverakonda. The film is directed by Rahul Sankrityan, with Sreeleela reportedly cast as the female lead. This film marks the second collaboration between Deverakonda and Sankrityan, who previously worked together on Taxiwaala (2018); the story is reportedly set in the Rayalaseema region during the 19th century. Later, there were rumors that Rashmika Mandanna would play the female lead in the film. This film also marks Deverakonda's third collaboration with Mythri Movie Makers, following Dear Comrade (2019) and Khushi (2023). T-Series serves as the presenting studio for this film.

In late January 2026, on the eve of Republic Day, the makers officially announced the film's title: Ranabaali. In the promotional video revealing the film's title, the film is described as a period drama set during the era of British rule in India. According to sources, Ranabaali is neither a biopic nor a historical reenactment; rather, it is a cinematic reconstruction of an era, based on various authentic records, oral histories, and suppressed archival materials. The film's score is composed by Ajay-Atul; Nirav Shah serves as the cinematographer for this film, while Karthika Srinivas is responsible for the editing.

=== Casting ===
In May 2025, it was reported that Mandanna had signed on to play the female lead in the film. Mandanna and Deverakonda previously starred together in Geetha Govindam (2018) and Dear Comrade. Deverakonda plays the title character, Ranabaali, while Mandanna plays a character named Jayamma. Sankrityan stated that the name "Jayamma" was taken from his mother's name. Reportedly, Deverakonda spent six months undergoing training, which included horseback riding, swordsmanship, the use of firearms, combat mostly importantly the Rayalaseema dialect and slang with the help of Kittu Chilamakuru. Deverakonda mentioned multiple time about this as it helped him grab the nativity and intensity of the region as it was the soul of the film. He also engaged in a high-intensity fitness regimen.

Hollywood actor Arnold Vosloo appears in the film, playing the villain, Sir Theodore Hector. Sankrityan stated that he wanted the villainous role to be played by a well, known Hollywood actor; during the casting process, he set his sights on Vosloo, noting, "We were keen on Arnold as his work in The Mummy is so well known in India and adds to a strong nostalgia factor as well for the audience." From the second half of 2025 until early this year, Vosloo spent nearly six months in India.

=== Filming ===
Principal photography for the film officially began on 12 March 2026. Hyderabad is the primary filming location for this film. By April 2026, the production team had completed the key filming phase for the movie in Rayalaseema. From late May to early June 2026, the production team filmed near Gandikota; this shoot included emotional scenes between Deverakonda and Mandanna. By early June, the film had completed its 100 day shooting schedule.

According to reports from August 2026, Mandanna sustained an injury while performing back-to-back action and dance sequences for the films Ranabaali and Mysaa (2026). She suffered a complete tear of a hip tendon and is expected to take a six-week break. In 17 September 2026, the film was officially declared wrapped. The filming of this movie took approximately 130 days. According to Sankrityan, the film's climax took 16 days to shoot. In addition to Hyderabad and Gandikota, the film was also shot in Anantapur and Bethamcherla.

=== Post-production ===
In September 2026, the makers stated that the film's post-production was progressing well, and that the background music for the first half of the movie had already been completed. In an interview, Deverakonda stated that the rough cut of Ranabaali was approximately 3 hours and 20 minutes long, while the final runtime was set at 2 hours and 50 minutes. According to the Central Board of Film Certification (CBFC) certificate, the film has a runtime of 178 minutes.

== Music ==
The music of the film is composed by Ajay-Atul. On 6 March 2026, the makers released "Endhayya Saami (Special Surprise)", a wedding song from the film, to celebrate the marriage of Deverakonda and Mandanna. The couple had tied the knot just two days earlier, on 26 February 2026. The whole song of titled "Endhayya Saami" was released on 22 September 2026. The second track, a ballad titled "Kobali", was released on 12 October. The full album released on 14 October 2026.

== Marketing ==
Among the many posters for this film, the first one has garnered a particularly enthusiastic response. In it, Deverakonda and Mandanna appear in wedding attire, styled to resemble an old photograph from the 19th century. Sankrityan noted that this image was not originally intended to be a poster; rather, it emerged spontaneously during the shoot. The couple, having recently married, arrived on set in their wedding attire, so Sankrityan asked them to pose for a photo in those outfits—which ultimately became this poster.

A teaser titled "The Savage's Oath" was released on 9 September 2026. The official trailer will be released on 9 October 2026. The makers was hold pre-release events on 13 October 2026, at Shilpakala Vedika, Hyderabad.

== Release ==
=== Theatrical ===
Ranabaali was released on 16 October 2026; in addition to the Telugu version, it was also issued with dubbed versions in Hindi, Tamil, Kannada and Malayalam languages. This date is just one day apart from the Tamil film Jailer 2. Previously, the makers had scheduled the release date for 11 September 2026. However, Ranabaali was released in India on October 16 solely in its original Telugu version, without a simultaneous multi-language release. Mythri Movie Makers and international distributors have confirmed that the release of the multi-language versions has been delayed due to unexpected technical setbacks during the post-production phase of the dubbed content. The Hindi version is now set for release on 23 October 2026.

This film has been granted a U/A certificate by the CBFC and has not undergone any cuts. As of 15 October 2026, pre-sale figures for the film in North America had surpassed $275,000 ahead of its official release.

Shortly after the film's release, audiences began complaining that the volume in certain scenes was too low. In response, the makers instructed the distributor to notify theaters to adjust the volume, ensuring that viewers would have the best possible audio experience.

=== Distribution ===
Mythri Movie Makers is handling the distribution of this film in Andhra Pradesh, Telangana, and the Nizam region, while AA Films acquired the distribution rights for North India. The overseas distribution of this film is handled by Phars Film and Prathyangira Cinemas.

=== Home media ===
The post-theatrical digital streaming rights of the film were acquired by Netflix. The film began streaming on the platform from 13 November 2026 in Telugu and dubbed versions of Hindi, Tamil, Kannada and Malayalam languages.

== Reception ==
=== Box office ===
In its opening day, the film garnered a net box office collection of ₹9.25 crore in India. Its total domestic gross reached ₹10.75 crore, while the overseas box office brought in ₹5.4 crore, bringing the global total to ₹16.15 crore. There are also reports stating that the global box office exceeded ₹18 crore. Among these, the film's opening-day box office in the Nizam region stood at ₹2.45 crores. In its fourth day of release, the film’s global box office reached ₹46.5 crores. By the fifth day of its theatrical release, the film had already recouped 68% of its production costs. In its first week of release, the film’s global box office reached ₹66 crore. In its tenth day of release, the film reached a global box office of ₹75.2 crore. By the time it finished its theatrical run, the film had grossed approximately ₹80–81.10 crore globally, a poor commercial performance.

=== Critical response ===
The film received mixed reviews from critics.

Divya Shree of The Times of India gave 3.5/5 stars and wrote "The first half maintains a steady balance of romance, action, and drama, making for an engaging watch. While the second half occasionally slows under the weight of its narrative, it gradually regains momentum as the emotional and historical stakes deepen. The violence is intense and, at times, excessive, but it reinforces the brutality of the era and the motivations behind Ranabaali's rebellion. Despite a few pacing issues, the film succeeds in bringing an overlooked historical event to the screen by blending historical depth with the elements of commercial cinema." Yashaswini Sri of The Indian Express gave the film a 2.5/5 stars; she praised the on-screen chemistry between Deverakonda and Mandanna, but criticized the film's runtime and pacing.

BVS Prakash of the Deccan Chronicle gave the film a 2/5 rating, noting that while Deverakonda's look and dialect were commendable, his performance fell short; Mandanna's performance, however, was spot on. He further remarked, "A nearly three-hour runtime need not be a problem if the story and its emotional highs hold the audience's attention. Unfortunately, Ranabaali struggles on that front." Latha Srinivasan of NDTV gave 2/5 stars and wrote "Vijay is totally committed to the role, but Ranabaali ended up being all about heroism, and it becomes a missed opportunity for a character that could have been explored in depth."

Neeshita Nyayapati of Hindustan Times gave 2/5 stars and wrote "Even though Rahul Sankrityan's Ranabaali is fundamentally about Indians fighting the British rather than among themselves, the film's overall tone took me right back to that time. Vijay Deverakonda plays the machete-wielding angry young man in this tale, which falls short of being engaging." He concluded "Ranabaali's heart (both the film and the character's) only seems to beat when Jayamma is around. Rashmika might not nail her lip sync during a key song, but her beautifully written character injects life and reminds you to give a damn. If only the rest of the film were like that." T Maruthi Acharya of India Today gave 2/5 stars and wrote "For Vijay Deverakonda, Ranabaali is another missed opportunity. Ranabaali has the scale, ambition, and occasional flashes of brilliance, but it lacks the one thing a film about a fierce warrior and a people's rebellion needs most: a pulse. In the end, it feels less like a battle cry and more like a lullaby for the audience who walk in for an action spectacle."
