= Kalyani Natarajan =

Indian actress

- Born: Kalyani
- Occupation: Actress
- Years active: 2013–present
- Spouse: Balakrishnan Natarajan

Kalyani Natarajan is an Indian actress who appears in Telugu and Tamil films. She played prominent roles in Saivam (2014), Pisaasu (2014) and Mahanubhavudu (2017).

== Personal life and career ==
A Tamilian from Mumbai, Kalyani has a degree in English literature and worked as a teacher and consultant. She had an interest in theatre and acted in plays in Mumbai. While in Mumbai, she was part of several major drama troupes. Later, she began acting in commercials including a jewellery commercial with Trisha.

Her stage plays in Mumbai enabled her to get a role in Settai (2013), which was shot in Mumbai. In the same year, she played Imran Khan's sister-in-law in Dharma Productions' Gori Tere Pyaar Mein (2013). She was also cast as Sathyaraj's wife in A. L. Vijay's Thalaivaa (2013). However, she left the latter film.

She collaborated again with director A. L. Vijay for Saivam (2014), which was her first major break. Kalyani had shot for 38 days in Karaikudi for the film. While she was in Chennai during the release of Saivam, she met director Mysskin and auditioned for a role in Pisaasu (2014), a role which she bagged. Atlee signed her to play a doctor in Theri (2016) after seeing her performance in Pisaasu.

Kalyani made her Telugu film debut with Dictator (2016) and has acted in Mahanubhavudu (2017), Vijetha (2018), Dear Comrade (2019) amongst others. She played maternal roles in several films.

Her short film debut was with Daro Mat (2017) in which she played a toxic mother-in-law. She is one of the founding members of a Mumbai-based theatre production house Clean Slate Creations along with her husband Balakrishnan Natarajan, who is also an actor in Hindi cinema.

== Filmography ==
Key
†	Denotes films that have not yet been released

=== Telugu films ===
Year	Film	Role	Notes
2016	Dictator	Mrs. Lakshmi Narayana	
2017	Mahanubhavudu	Anand's mother	
2018	Vijetha	Lakshmi	
2018	Geetha Govindam	Neelu's mother	
2018	Shailaja Reddy Alludu	Chaitu's mother	
2018	Kavacham	Vijay's mother	
2018	Padi Padi Leche Manasu	Vaishali's mother	
2019	Dear Comrade	Bobby's mother	
2019	ABCD: American Born Confused Desi	Aravind's mother	
2020	Ala Vaikunthapurramuloo	Nandini's mother	
2020	Bheeshma	Kalyani	
2020	Solo Brathuke So Better	Virat's mother	
2021	FCUK: Father Chitti Umaa Kaarthik	Umaa's mother	
2021	Varudu Kaavalenu	Karthik's relative	
2022	Aadavallu Meeku Johaarlu	Saradamma	
2022	Kotha Kothaga	Padma	
2022	Aa Ammayi Gurinchi Meeku Cheppali	Sumithra	
2022	The Ghost	Dr. Iyer	
2022	Meet Cute	Sashikala	TV series Premiered on SonyLIV
2023	Waltair Veerayya	Vikram’s mother	
2023	Amigos	Siddharth's mother	
2023	Ravanasura	Hanumanth Rao’s wife	
2023	Rangabali	Shaurya’s mother	
2024	Siddharth Roy	Siddhartha Roy's mother	
2024	The Family Star	Wedding aunty	
2024	Mr. Bachchan	Jikki's mother	
2024	Zebra	Surya's mother	
2025	The 100	Vikranth's mother	

=== Tamil films ===
Year	Title	Role	Notes
2013	Settai	House owner	Uncredited
2014	Saivam	Meenakshi	
2014	Pisaasu	Janaki Soundarrajan	
2015	Oru Naal Iravil	Shekhar's wife	
2016	Maalai Naerathu Mayakkam	Manoja's mother	
2016	Theri	Forensic examiner	
2016	Remo	Kavya's mother	
2017	Kuttram 23	Dr. Tulsi	
2017	Mupparimanam	Kathir's mother	
2017	Daro Mat	Divya's mother-in-law	Short Film
2017	Theeran Adhigaaram Ondru	Priya's mother	
2018	Sarkar	Sundar's mother	
2018	Thuppakki Munai	Bose's mother	
2019	Embiran	Priyan's mother	
2019	Lisaa	Lisaa's mother	
2021	Master	College staff member	
2022	Nitham Oru Vaanam	Arjun's mother	
2024	Indian 2	Chitra Varadharajan	
2026	Kadhal Kadhai Sollava	Shreya's mother	
2026	Vishwanath & Sons	Prakash’s mother	

=== Hindi films ===
Year	Title	Role	Notes
2013	Gori Tere Pyaar Mein	Sriram's sister-in-law	
