= Aadavallu Meeku Johaarlu (2022 film) =

2022 film directed by Tirumala Kishore

- Theatrical release poster
- Directed by: Kishore Tirumala
- Written by: Kishore Tirumala
- Produced by: Sudhakar Cherukuri; Ramana Rao Rudrapati
- Starring: Rashmika Mandanna; Khushbu Sundar; Radhika Sarathkumar; Urvashi; Sharwanand
- Cinematography: Sujith Sarang
- Edited by: A. Sreekar Prasad
- Music by: Devi Sri Prasad
- Production company: SLV Cinemas
- Release date: 4 March 2022
- Running time: 141 minutes
- Country: India
- Language: Telugu

Aadavallu Meeku Johaarlu (transl. Salutation to you, ladies) is a 2022 Indian Telugu-language romantic comedy drama film written and directed by Kishore Tirumala. Produced by SLV Cinemas, the film stars Rashmika Mandanna, Khushbu Sundar, Radhika Sarathkumar and Urvashi, and Sharwanand.

Tirumala initially planned the film in 2016 with Venkatesh and Nithya Menen as the leads but it did not materialize. The project was revived in October 2020 with Sharwanand and Mandanna replacing them. Principal photography of the film commenced in July 2021 and ended in February 2022 with the filming primarily taking place in Hyderabad and Rajamahendravaram. The film's score and soundtrack are composed by Devi Sri Prasad. Sujith Sarang and A. Sreekar Prasad performed the cinematography and editing respectively.

Aadavallu Meeku Johaarlu was released on 4 March 2022 and opened to mixed reviews from critics. The film was a commercial failure. The second half of the film is loosely inspired by the 1999 Tamil film Minsara Kanna, particularly the way Khushbu Sundar's role is characterised as a businesswoman who has a strong prejudice against men.

== Plot ==
Chiranjeevi grows up in the company of five strong headed women, including his mother Aadhi Lakshmi and aunts Padmamma, Sharadamma, Gouramma and Santhamma. Though they love and dote on him, they nitpick and reject almost every bride match he gets, The film deals with his journey in finding a suitable bride who is approved by all the five. At last, The right girl comes in the form of Aadhya.

== Cast ==
- Rashmika Mandanna as Aadhya
- Khushbu Sundar as Vakula, Aadhya's mother
- Radhika Sarathkumar as Aadhi Lakshmi, Chiru's mother
- Urvashi as Padmamma, Chiru's aunt
- Sharwanand as Chiranjeevi "Chiru"
- Rajashri Nair as Gouramma, Chiru's aunt
- Kalyani Natarajan as Sharadamma, Chiru's aunt
- Satya Krishnan as Santhamma, Chiru's aunt
- Brahmanandam as Buchi
- Vennela Kishore as Phani, Chiru's friend
- Satya as Prem, a manager
- Jhansi as Saritha, Vakula's friend
- Rajitha as maid, Vasu's wife
- Ravi Shankar as Sai Krishna, Prashanth's father
- Banerjee as Chiru's father
- Goparaju Ramana as Chiru's uncle
- Vasu Inturi as Chiru's uncle
- Pradeep Rawat as Vasu, an employee
- Surya Sreenivas as Vijay
- Sudharshan as Tomato seller
- Ruchitha Sadineni as Pravalika, Saritha's daughter
- Ravi Teja Mahadasyam as Prashanth, Pravalika's husband
- Pramodini as Prashanth's mother
- RCM Raju

== Production ==
In 2016, director Kishore Tirumala teamed up with actors Venkatesh and Nithya Menen for the romantic comedy titled Aadavallu Meeku Johaarlu. However, the project was kept on back burner. In an interview in 2017, Tirumala stated, "I feel the story for Adavallu... needs improvisation and so, I asked Venky sir sometime to arrive with a convincing script. The film is definitely on but it will take some time to hit the floors." Tirumala later wrote a different version of the story while retaining the basic premise.

The project was revived in 2020 with actor Sharwanand replacing Venkatesh. The film was formally announced on 25 October 2020 with a launch ceremony, marking Sharwanand's first collaboration with Tirumala. Actresses like Menen and Sai Pallavi were considered for the female lead role but Rashmika Mandanna was finalized. Veteran actresses Radhika Sarathkumar, Khushbu Sundar and Urvashi joined the production in August 2021.

Principal photography of the film began on 20 July 2021 in Hyderabad. Filming also took place in Rajamahendravaram where majority of the film is shot. The shoot was completed in February 2022.

== Music ==
Aadavallu Meeku Johaarlu

Soundtrack album by Devi Sri Prasad
- Released: 8 March 2022
- Recorded: 2021–2022
- Genre: Feature film soundtrack
- Length: 16:36
- Language: Telugu
- Label: Lahari Music
- Producer: Devi Sri Prasad

Devi Sri Prasad chronology
Khiladi (2022)	Aadavallu Meeku Johaarlu (2022)	F3 (2022)

Singles from Aadavallu Meeku Johaarlu
- 1. "Aadavallu Meeku Johaarlu" Released: 4 February 2022; 2. "Oh My Aadhya" Released: 14 February 2022; 3. "Awesome" Released: 19 February 2022; 4. "Mangalyam" Released: 23 February 2022

The music was composed by Tirumala Kishore's usual composer Devi Sri Prasad. Lahari Music acquired the film's audio rights. The first single, "Aadavallu Meeku Johaarlu" was released on 4 February 2022, and was sung by Devi Sri Prasad himself with lyrics written by Sri Mani.

No.	Title	Lyrics	Singer(s)	Length
1.	"Aadavallu Meeku Johaarlu"	Sri Mani	Devi Sri Prasad	3:19
2.	"Oh My Aadhya"	Sri Mani	Yazin Nizar	4:14
3.	"Awesome"	Sri Mani	Sagar	3:03
4.	"Mangalyam"	Devi Sri Prasad	Jaspreet Jasz	3:10
5.	"Kalaga Kalaga"	Sri Mani	Mahalingam	2:50
Total length:				16:36

== Release ==
Aadavallu Meeku Johaarlu was released on 4 March 2022. The film was initially scheduled for release on 25 February but was deferred by a week to avoid a clash with Bheemla Nayak.

The film made a pre-release business of ₹16 crore from its theatricals. The Telangana theatrical rights are given to Sri Karthikeya Cinemas. SonyLIV acquired the film's digital streaming rights.

== Reception ==
=== Critical reception ===
Aadavallu Meeku Johaarlu received mixed reviews from critics. The Hans India gave the film a rating of 3.5/5 and wrote "A feel-good movie with a complete lovely family drama... It is worth watching this summer as every movie buff will enjoy it to the core!". Neeshita Nyayapati of The Times of India gave the film a rating of 2.5/5 and wrote "Aadavallu Meeku Johaarlu has moments that are relatable but the film runs on a paper-thin storyline that does not warrant even its short run-time. If only the film had something novel to tell."

Writing for The Hindu, Sangeetha Devi Dundoo said that the film began as a humorous drama descended into a "melodramatic, boring narrative that the talented actors cannot salvage". The Indian Express critic Gabbeta Ranjith Kumar called it a "half-boiled drama", and felt that the director was divided between making a masala entertainer and a message-driven film.

=== Box office ===
Aadavallu Meeku Johaarlu grossed ₹3.6 crore worldwide on its opening day with a distributor's share of ₹1.9 crore. In its opening weekend, the collected a distributor's share of ₹5.67 crore. By the end of its theatrical run, the earned a distributor's share of ₹7.72 crore, and incurred a loss of about ₹8 crore.
