= Cashify =

Indian recommerce company

Manak Waste Management Pvt. Ltd.
- Trade name: Cashify
- Formerly: ReGlobe (2009–2013)
- Type: Private
- Industry: Recommerce; E-commerce
- Founded: 2009; 17 years ago
- Founder: Amit Sethi; Mandeep Manocha; Nakul Kumar; Siddhant Dhingra
- Headquarters: Gurgaon, India
- Area served: India
- Key people: Mandeep Manocha (CEO)
- Website: Official website

Cashify (formerly known as ReGlobe) is a recommerce company with headquarters in Gurgaon, India. It was founded in 2009. It operates as an online marketplace where users can sell their used electronic gadgets like mobile phones, tablets, smartwatches, laptops and video game consoles to professional buyers. It also deals in refurbished devices.

== History ==
Cashify was founded in 2009 as ReGlobe by Mandeep Manocha, Nakul Kumar and Amit Sethi. The company operated as ReGlobe from 2009 to 2012. The company had completed their first project with the mobile handset maker Nokia.

In October 2013, the company partnered with Snapdeal to buy back mobiles, tablets and laptops. Later Cashify formed partnerships with various original equipment manufacturers, including Amazon, eBay, Infibeam, Apple Inc., Samsung, OnePlus, Oppo, Xiaomi, Vivo and HP, under which these companies offer buy-back services. In April 2019, Cashify partnered with Xiaomi to launch the 'Mi Recycle' feature through its MIUI Security app.

In July 2019, the company launched its first offline store in Faridabad, Haryana. It opened 60 offline stores across India, including in cities like Delhi, Mumbai, Bangalore, Patna, Kanpur and Ranchi. As of April 2022, it has 103 offline stores in tier-1 cities.

In June 2020, it raised donations to provide free refurbished mobile phones to non-profit organisations to support children dealing with the online shift of classes through its Donate for Education campaign. In August 2021, the company appointed Bollywood actor Rajkummar Rao as its brand ambassador. Cashify onboarded Rashmika Mandanna as its brand ambassador to spread brand awareness in the South Indian markets in February 2022.

The company gets 80% of its supply from its direct channels, including its website, which offers doorstep pick-up facilities, and offline stores and kiosks. Cashify also retails refurbished phones under PhonePro, contributing 20% of the company's revenue. The company has 30 million users on its app. Cashify uses technology to determine a used phone's value based on criteria such as age, condition and warranty coverage.

=== Acquisitions ===
In July 2016, the company bought MobiBing, a Bangalore based re-commerce platform operated by Innowhiz Online Services Pvt Ltd. It acquired Teksolvr, a Chandigarh based gadget-repairing company in January 2019. In July 2021, Cashify acquired UniShop, an omnichannel retail platform, for an undisclosed amount.

== Finances ==
In April 2015, the company raised funding for an undisclosed amount from Bessemer Venture Partners and Blume Ventures, followed by its Series A funding for an undisclosed sum led by Shunwei Capital and existing investors Bessemer Venture Partners and Blume Ventures in July 2017. The company received ₹6 crores of venture debt from Trifecta Capital in February 2018.

In June 2018, Cashify raised funding of $12 million, led by Chinese private equity firm CDH Investments and Morningside Venture, along with strategic investor AiHuiShou. In March 2021, it secured $15 million in funding for a round Series D led by New York-based Olympus Capital Asia's clean energy and sustainability arm, Asia Environmental Partners. Cashify raised $90 million in its Series E funding from NewQuest Capital Partners and Prosus in June 2022. Ecommerce company Amazon invested ₹ 39.5 crores through its Amazon.com NV Investment Holdings LLC, while existing investor Blume Ventures invested ₹13.45 crores as a part of the Series E round.

In Financial Year 2023 Cashify's revenue was RS 815.9 Crore and In FY22 was Rs 497.7 Crore. Net Loss after tax was Rs 147.9 Crore and In FY 22 was Rs 99.0 Crore loss.

== Other ==
There have been a few reported instances where alleged thieves used the platform to sell robbed phones or electric devices. In April 2019, it was reported that Cashify complained about fraudsters and imposters cheating customers of Cashify. However, they were let off with a written apology.

== See also ==
- Electronic waste
- Reuse
