= Ye Mantram Vesave =

2018 Indian film by Sridhar Marri

- Theatrical release poster
- Directed by: Shridhar Marri
- Produced by: Shridhar Marri; Malkapuram Shivakumar(Presenter)
- Starring: Vijay Deverakonda; Shivaani Singh
- Cinematography: Shiva Reddy
- Edited by: Dharmendra Kakarala
- Music by: Madhav; Ankit
- Production company: Golisoda Films P
- Release date: 9 March 2018
- Country: India
- Language: Telugu

Ye Mantram Vesave (transl. What spell did you cast?) is a 2018 Indian Telugu romantic drama film directed by Sridhar Marri (in his directorial debut). starring Vijay Deverakonda and debutante Shivaani Singh. It is produced by Golisoda Films. This film was supposed to release in 2013 but released on 9 March 2018 with no expectations and performed poorly at the box office.

== Plot ==
This is the story of a man who plays video games.

Nikki's parents are worried as he is a video game addict and spends all day in his room playing video games. He is also a playboy who loves to make girls fall for him through social media. Rags is a girl who is filled with fun and love, works in a gaming company. Danny who works with Rags is a part of a trafficking group and tries to trap her. But she doesn't fall for that. Nikki on his friend's words tries to woo her through social media but she rejects his friend requests as her girl friends tells her that Nikki is just a playboy and had played with their feelings in past. She along with her friends decides to teach him a lesson. Unaware of this, Nikki tries different ways to impress Rags to gain her attention, but fails. Then at last she agrees to be friends with him only if he succeed in finding her through a game. He gets excited believing he is the greatest champion, accepts her challenge. Through this game Nikki explores the outer world and the thrills. When he was about to find Rags through the clues left by her, Danny along with some goons attacks Nikki revealing him that Rags was their aim and left him clueless. When Nikki tries to warn Rags about the danger she is in, she does not believe him and blocks him. Nikki sets out to find Rags by realizing that he is in love with her. But not knowing of her address or proper name he finds it difficult. Then he manages to find her but then Danny tries to kidnap her by injuring Nikki but Rags met with an accident. The next day, Nikki is trying to find Rags by searching every hospital possible.

Meanwhile, the main man behind these traps Rag's friend and kidnaps her to get to Rags. In the meantime Rags also fall in love with Nikki. Danny finds out Rags and kidnaps her but by realizing that Rags is in love with Nikki, Danny sends a video of kidnapped Rags telling Nikki to stay out of Rags life. Nikki gets furious and goes to the police station. From there he learns that many girls had gone missing the past two months. By investigating about it he finds out the factory where these girls are held captive and along with his friends he rescues the girls. But he couldn't find Rags among them. Nikki and his friend continue to search for Rags. Then both of them sees Rags' friend and Danny working together. Nikki runs after Danny and Nikki's friend chases Rags' friend. Nikki catches Danny and Danny's partner (Rags' former friend) drives up to Rags' house. A captured Danny shows Nikki the way to Rags' house and both of them go there. Meanwhile, Nikki's friend calls him and tells him about the current situation. Nikki tells him that he's coming and also tells him to get inside the house. When Nikki's friend knocks, Rags' uncle opens the door and invites him in. When he gets in, Danny's partner hits him in the head, knocking him out. Shortly after, Nikki and Danny arrives at Rags' house and Nikki falls into the same trap his friend fell. Both of them wake up to find out that both of them have been tied up.

Then Rags' uncle explains their plan and then explains how they killed Rags, revealing that they had been working together all along. Upon hearing this, Nikki becomes infuriated. Danny's partner is about to kill them by using a drill machine to incinerate their eyes. But, to both Nikki and his friend's luck, a phone call reveals that a 14-year-old girl has escaped from captivity and Danny, Rags' uncle and Danny's partner set out to catch that girl. Nikki and his friend escapes and Nikki cries for Rags. Nikki goes to Rags' burial site (Yellow Rock, where Nikki had come earlier during the quest for finding Rags) and mourns for her. Then he tries to dig out the body, when he finds out another clue related to the moonlight. He searches for the answer to the clue and he surprisingly spots Rags. He confronts Rags and Rags brings Nikki to the National Games Competition. There, he spots a few pictures, in which Nikki is there. Then, he goes to the main hall, and then he, much to his surprise, is greeted by everyone Nikki thought to be his enemies. And then, he shockingly finds out that he was actually part of a game called 'Login 2 Life' by Rags. Rags found out Nikki, a true gamer and used him to create a real-life game, so that all the hardcore gamers can get in touch with the real life. The feelings Nikki displayed for Rags really changed Rags' feeling about Nikki. Rags begs for Nikki's forgiveness, but Nikki, without saying anything, exits the pavilion to see that his parents are waiting for him. In the ending scene, Nikki confronts Rags.

== Cast ==
- Vijay Deverakonda as Nikhil "Nikky"
- Shivaani Singh as Rags
- Komya Virk as Nishi
- Nilakshi Dutta as Ritu
- Sriram Venkatesh as Jai
- Ashish Raj Bidkikar as Sameer
- Prabhavathi as Satya
- Sivannarayana Naripeddi as Nikhil's father
- Henna Chopra as Shirali
- Thiruveer as Hari
- Nalla Balu as Sadhu

== Production ==
This film's title is based on Ye Maaya Chesave (2010). It was made in 2013, but was released five years later. After Vijay Devarakonda realised the film was based on The Game (1997), he did not promote the film.

== Soundtrack ==
No.	Title	Lyrics	Music	Singer(s)	Length
1.	"Ye Vela Chusano Kaani"	Arun Vemuri	Abdus Samad	Yazin Nizar	3:30
2.	"Go Lady Gaga"	Arun Vemuri	Abdus Samad	Lipsika, Sahiti, Ramya Behara, Sweekar Agasthi	03:27
3.	"Nuvvantu Leni Lokam"	Arun Vemuri	Abdus Samad	Dinakar	04:28
4.	"Suduraala Teeraala Paata"	Arun Vemuri	Abdus Samad	Pranavi	03:48

== Reception ==
A critic from The Times of India Samayam rated the film 1 1/2 out of 5 and wrote that "Director Sridhar Marri, who is a software engineer, tried to show something new by linking it with technology. But it was a bit of a burden for the audience". A critic from The Times of India rated the film 1 1/4 out of 5 and wrote that "Give this one a miss this weekend unless you’re in for some outdated concepts, sexist jokes that fail at being humorous, weird camera angles and an awkward-as-a-teenager Vijay Deverakonda".

A critic from The Hindu wrote that "As for Deverakonda, let’s not debate whether he has to own up to a film that he did in his struggling days, but solely going by viewing experience, this backlog is best forgotten". A critic from Cinema Express wrote that "Try watching YMV only to see how far Vijay has come in terms of acting".
