= The Girlfriend (2025 film) =

2025 Indian film by Rahul Ravindran

- Theatrical release poster
- Directed by: Rahul Ravindran
- Written by: Rahul Ravindran
- Produced by: Vidya Koppineedi; Dheeraj Mogilineni
- Starring: Rashmika Mandanna; Dheekshith Shetty; Anu Emmanuel
- Cinematography: Krishnan Vasant
- Edited by: Chota K. Prasad
- Music by: Songs: Hesham Abdul Wahab; Prashanth R Vihari; Score: Prashanth R. Vihari
- Production companies: Dheeraj Mogilineni Entertainment; Geetha Arts
- Distributed by: Geetha Arts
- Release date: 7 November 2025
- Running time: 138 minutes
- Country: India
- Language: Telugu
- Budget: ₹12 crore
- Box office: ₹30 crore

The Girlfriend is a 2025 Indian Telugu-language romantic drama film written and directed by Rahul Ravindran. The film stars Rashmika Mandanna, Dheekshith Shetty, and Anu Emmanuel.

Principal photography began in early 2025, with shooting taking place across Hyderabad, Visakhapatnam, and other locations in Andhra Pradesh and Telangana. Most of the film was shot at India's famous law college NALSAR University of Law, Hyderabad. The soundtrack and background score was composed by Hesham Abdul Wahab.

The film garnered mixed reception from critics and audiences alike, who praised cast performance, the plot, the music, and direction, and grossed around ₹30 crore at the box office becoming a Super hit.

== Plot ==
Bhooma Devi enrolls at Ramalingaiah College to pursue her master's degree in literature. Vikram is another new student pursuing a master's degree in computer science. One evening, she and her friend, Harshitha, are reprimanded by a police constable, but Vikram and his friends thrash the constable. The following day, Vikram and his friends return to college after being beaten up at the police station. Bhooma administers first aid to Vikram. Over the following days, Vikram befriends Bhooma. One evening, Vikram kisses Bhooma after they watch a movie in his hostel room. The following day, Vikram spreads the news that Bhooma is his girlfriend, and the two start dating. Durga, a debonair and urbane girl in love with Vikram, is envious and resents Bhooma. However, they both become good friends when they work together on a college play.

However, everything is not what it seems when Vikram threatens one of Bhooma's male friends to stay away from her and accuses her of enjoying attention from other men while acting in the college play. One day, Durga urges Bhooma to skip a meeting with Vikram at the canteen and join her at an arcade. There, Durga attempts to warn Bhooma about Vikram, but Bhooma does not take it seriously. The following day, Vikram gives Bhooma the silent treatment for not feeding him and relents only when she does. On his birthday, Vikram takes Bhooma to Ballari to meet his mother. Bhooma is puzzled by Vikram's mother's shy, mute behaviour. Vikram praises his mother's conduct, describing how she never dared to displease his father and how his father disliked her stepping out of the kitchen. Bhooma is unnerved when Vikram assures her that he will never lay a hand on her. Later, during dinner, when Bhooma asks Vikram about their future plans after marriage, Vikram explains that he will go wherever he is posted, assuming that Bhooma will follow him. If not, he will run his father's business in Ballari. When Bhooma asks what would happen if she got placed, Vikram explains that it would be tedious for her to manage both a job and housework. He also insists on having three children.

Back in Hyderabad, Bhooma feels suffocated and suffers a panic attack. Vikram arrives, concerned for Bhooma but also isolating her from her friends. Bhooma asks Vikram for space, but he tells her that he knows better than she does and that spending time with him will ease her stress. Things worsen when Bhooma's abusive father discovers Vikram in Bhooma's room, and the two men clash. Bhooma's father angrily demands that Professor Sudheer, the HOD, immediately issue a transfer certificate, but Sudheer sternly refuses, causing the father to throw a tantrum in the office. Bhooma's father then cuts off contact with his distressed daughter. Two days later, Bhooma is horrified to discover that Vikram has made arrangements for their wedding the following day. She insists she wants to finish her degree first, but Vikram casually dismisses her degree as useless. Bhooma finally breaks up with Vikram, who does not take the rejection kindly and accuses her of being a gold digger who toyed with him only to leave him when it mattered.

The following day, Vikram and his friends surround Bhooma, and Vikram threatens to slut-shame her if she dares to seek a job or get married. Later, Vikram assaults Satya after the latter advises him to stop harassing Bhooma. Satya condemns Vikram, declaring that he never loved Bhooma, only the idea of a submissive woman, and that he never wanted friends, only admirers who would validate him no matter what. Meanwhile, Bhooma is devastated when Vikram and his friends paint her door, advertising her as a call girl. Durga helps clean the door and consoles Bhooma. Later, Bhooma desperately calls her father, but instead of offering support, he calls her a loose woman who should have died instead of her mother. Bhooma screams in rage and smashes her phone.

Later, at the farewell party, she makes a speech about how she felt cornered by Vikram and declares that she does not care if he slut-shames her. She says that she will either find an understanding partner or remain unmarried. Bhooma tries to whack Vikram with an electric guitar but walks away at the last moment. In the epilogue, it is revealed that Bhooma has completed her MA degree and is now working at a pharmaceutical company. She enjoys travelling, writing her own book, and spending time with her friends.

== Cast ==
- Rashmika Mandanna as Bhooma Devi "Bhoo"
- Dheekshith Shetty as Vikram "Vicky"
- Anu Emmanuel as Durga "Dee"
- Rahul Ravindran as Prof. Sudheer (HOD)
- Rao Ramesh as Bhooma's father
- Rohini Molleti as Vicky's mother

== Soundtrack ==
The soundtrack was composed by Hesham Abdul Wahab and Prashanth R Vihari for 2 songs (Seethakoka Chiluka) & (Tummedhe). The audio rights were acquired by T-Series.

The Girlfriend [Telugu]
No.	Title	Lyrics	Singer(s)	Length
1.	"Reyi Lolothula"	Rakendu Mouli & Rahul Ravindran	Hesham Abdul Wahab, Chinmayi Sripada & Vijay Deverakonda	1:38
2.	"Nadhive"	Rakendu Mouli	Hesham Abdul Wahab	3:39
3.	"Em Jaruguthondhi"	Rakendu Mouli	Hesham Abdul Wahab, Chinmayi Sripada	4:37
4.	"Laayi Le"	Rakendu Mouli	Kapil Kapilan	2:54
5.	"Needhe Katha"	Rakendu Mouli	Anurag Kulkarni	3:23
6.	"Tummedhe"	Rakendu Mouli	Abhijith Rao	1:23
7.	"Seethakoka Chiluka"	Rakendu Mouli	Lakshmi Meghana	2:07
Total length:				19:41

== Release ==
The Girlfriend was released theatrically on 7 November 2025.

=== Home media ===
The film has been streaming on Netflix since 5 December 2025.

== Reception ==
B. H. Harsh of Cinema Express rated the film 4/5 stars and wrote, "Rashmika Mandanna delivers a knock-out performance in a film that is gripping, consistent in its craft and relevant in its themes".

Divya Shree of The Times of India gave the film 3.5/5 stars and wrote, "This film mirrors the realities of many young women by exposing affection disguised as control with parents and romantic partners and unveiling raw human emotions."

Swaroop Kodur of The Indian Express gave the film 3.5/5 stars and wrote, "Certain choices of the writer-director are tidy and formulaic, but they nevertheless support a story that pivots from the ordinary, and is resonant in many different ways. Watch this for Rashmika Mandanna’s heartfelt performance, if nothing else."

Pranati A. S. of Deccan Herald gave it 3/5 stars and wrote, "The movie, in many ways is like ‘Arjun Reddy’, but misogyny is not glorified here, instead the director depicts it as a serious mental illness. About 15 minutes into the film, you become aware of the director’s intent. That does make the movie predictable."

Sandeep Athreya of Sakshi Post gave it 3/5 stars and wrote, "Despite a few logical flaws and familiar storytelling, its strong performances, visuals, and message make it a worthwhile watch — especially for audiences who enjoy intense relationship dramas."

Kusumika Das of Times Now gave it 3/5 stars and wrote, "Rahul Ravindran’s direction, coupled with Rashmika’s career-best performance, makes this film both moving and meaningful. It’s a story that doesn’t just show heartbreak - it shows healing."

Sangeetha Devi Dundoo of The Hindu wrote, "The Girlfriend is an important, brave film that asks uncomfortable questions and tells both girls and boys that relationships should not be claustrophobic."

Balakrishna Ganeshan of The News Minute wrote, "If you are looking for a movie that might comfort you, The Girlfriend is definitely not it. It makes men question their privilege, their biases, their attitude towards women, their conditioning."

Sruthi Ganapathy Raman of The Hollywood Reporter India wrote, "The Girlfriend, led skilfully by Mandanna and Shetty, might be about toxic relationships and revolve around a conventional heteronormative couple with an alpha-beta equation, but it always makes sure to keep its characters accountable."

B. V. S. Prakash of Deccan Chronicle gave it 2/5 stars and wrote, "The film tries to deliver a thoughtful message—that toxicity is not always loud or violent; sometimes it lies in emotional dominance, lack of understanding, and the need to control. Unfortunately, the good intention gets lost in slow pacing, overstretched conflicts, and repetitive emotional loops."

Suhas Sistu of The Hans India gave it 2/5 stars and wrote, "Its metaphoric visual storytelling and Rashmika’s magnetic performance are its strengths. However, the stretched narrative and exaggerated contrasts between the leads make parts of the film feel unrealistic."
