= Ungarala Rambabu =

- Theatrical release poster
- Directed by: Kranthi Madhav
- Produced by: Paruchuri Kireeti
- Starring: Sunil; Miya; Prakash Raj
- Cinematography: Sarvesh Murari
- Edited by: Kotagiri Venkateswara Rao
- Music by: Ghibran
- Production company: United Movies
- Release date: 15 September 2017
- Country: India
- Language: Telugu

Ungarala Rambabu is a Telugu film written and directed by Kranthi Madhav and produced by Paruchuri Kiriti. It features Sunil, Miya and Prakash Raj in the lead roles. The film was released worldwide on 15 September 2017.

== Plot ==
Ram Babu (Sunil) is a rich man who loses everything after his grand father’s death. Left with no choice, he visits Badam Baba (Posani Krishna Murali) for some solace. Upon his suggestion, Ram Babu goes to a barren land and starts planting a tree. To his luck, he finds gold biscuits worth 200 crores and he, once again becomes rich. This incident makes him a strong believer in astrology. But as time passes, he starts incurring losses in his business. Once again, the baba asks him to marry a certain girl (Miya George) in his office to become safe in life. The twist is the tale arises when Ram Babu is pit against the girl’s dad (Prakash Raj) who is a communist in nature. Rest of the story is as to how Ram Babu wins his love and becomes successful in life.

== Cast ==
- Sunil as Ram Babu
- Miya as Savitri
- Prakash Raj as Ranga Nayar
- Posani Krishna Murali as Badam Baba
- Vennela Kishore as Lenin Sudhakar
- Ali as Bulli
- Raja Ravindra
- Rajiv Kanakala
- Thagubothu Ramesh
- Prabhas Sreenu
- Duvvasi Mohan
- Mani Chandana
- Hari Teja

== Soundtrack ==
Ungarala Rambabu

Soundtrack album to Ungarala Rambabu by Ghibran
- Released: Aug 2017
- Recorded: 2017
- Genre: Feature film soundtrack
- Length: 16:02
- Language: Telugu
- Label: Mango Music
- Producer: Ghibran

Ghibran chronology
Adhe Kangal (2017)	Ungarala Rambabu (2017)	Magalir Mattum (2017)

Track listing
No.	Title	Lyrics	Artist(s)	Length
1.	"Allari Pilla Gaadaa"	Rehman	Chinmayi, Dhanunjay	03:12
2.	"Hitenshan Teega"	Ramajogayya Sastry	Anudeep Dev	03:22
3.	"Hoo Laa Laa Hoo Laa Laa"	Rehman	Yazin Nizar, Dhanunjay	03:11
4.	"Mughalai Biryani"	Ramajogayya Sastry	Hemchandra, Geetha Madhuri	03:11
5.	"Nuvve Naa Adrushtam"	Rehman	L. V. Revanth, Chinmayi	03:06
Total length:				16:02

== Reception ==
Times of India gave the film 3 out of 5 stars stating, "Ungarala Rambabu' is a laugh-all-the-way fare". On the contrary, The Hindu gave a negative review.
