= Rashmika Mandanna =

Indian actress (born 1996)

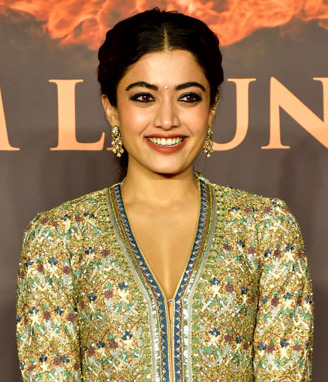
- Mandanna in 2025
- Born: 5 April 1996 (age 30); Virajpet, Karnataka, India
- Education: Ramaiah Institute of Technology, Bengaluru
- Occupation: Actress
- Years active: 2016–present
- Spouse: Vijay Deverakonda (m. 2026)

Rashmika Mandanna (born 5 April 1996) is an Indian actress who primarily works in Telugu and Hindi films. Known for her roles as the leading lady in big-budget action films, her accolades include five SIIMA Awards and a Filmfare Award South. She is among India's highest-paid actresses and was featured in Forbes India's 2024 list of "30 Under 30".

After a brief modelling career in 2014, Mandanna made her acting debut with the Kannada romantic comedy Kirik Party (2016) and gained further commercial success with the action film Anjani Putra and the romantic drama Chamak (both 2017). She expanded into Telugu cinema in 2018 with the comedy drama Chalo and achieved her breakthrough with the romantic comedy Geetha Govindam, which earned her the Filmfare Critics Award for Best Actress – Telugu. She went on to star as the leading lady in the action comedies Sarileru Neekevvaru and Bheeshma (both 2020).

Further recognition came with the pan-India success of the Telugu action film Pushpa: The Rise (2021) and a supporting role in the period drama Sita Ramam (2022) earned Mandanna critical recognition. She went onto star in the Tamil film Varisu (2023) before venturing into Hindi cinema with two unremarkable releases. Her most commercially successful films include the action dramas Animal (2023), Pushpa 2: The Rule (2024), for which she won the SIIMA Award for Best Actress, and Chhaava (2025), all of which rank among the highest-grossing Indian films. Though reception to these roles were varied due to their limited prominence within largely androcentric narratives, she received critical acclaim for her performance as a woman navigating a dysfunctional relationship in the Telugu drama The Girlfriend (2025), which earned her another SIIMA Award for Best Actress.

In addition to her acting career, Mandanna is the celebrity endorser for several brands and products. She is married to her frequent co-star Vijay Deverakonda.

== Early life and education ==
Rashmika Mandanna was born on 5 April 1996 to Suman and Madan Mandanna into a Kodava Hindu family in Virajpet, a town in Kodagu district, Karnataka. Her father owns a coffee estate and a function hall in her hometown, and her mother is a homemaker. She has a younger sister, Shiman whom she helped raise and has said she "felt like a maternal figure" towards. As a child, she has said her family struggled financially, and had difficulties finding a home and paying rent; according to Mandanna, her parents could not afford to buy her toys and the experience has continued to taint her relationship with money.

Mandanna attended Coorg Public School, a boarding school in Gonikoppal. During this phase of her life, she was often misunderstood due to her struggles with communication, making connecting with her peers difficult. Mandanna credits her mother for being a stabilising influence in her life and labelled her "my biggest strength".

Mandanna studied for a bachelor's degree in psychology, journalism and English literature at M. S. Ramaiah College of Arts, Science and Commerce in Bengaluru. In 2014, Mandanna was awarded The Times of India's Clean & Clear Fresh Face that recognises high-potential individuals; she was subsequently made a brand ambassador for Clean & Clear as part of the winning reward. This was followed by a brief modelling career in 2015, during which she won the second season of La Mode Bangalore's Top Model Hunt. Her success led to several acting offers from production houses, all of which she declined, as she had no intention of pursuing acting at the time. She was eventually persuaded by her college professor to audition, and after signing her first film, she informed her parents, who were initially hesitant due to her unassertive personality but ultimately gave their approval.

== Career ==
=== Early work and breakthrough (2016–2020) ===
After reading she had won a pageant in the newspaper in 2015, Rishab Shetty offered Mandanna her debut in his Kannada romantic comedy Kirik Party (2016) opposite Rakshit Shetty. She was introduced as Saanvi, a shy college student with ambitions of becoming an engineer; Mandanna said she deeply identified with the character's experience of often being overlooked at school. In a positive review for The Times of India, Sunayana Suresh wrote that Mandanna "is easily that pin-up girl in college and she breathes her path". Kirik Party emerged as the year's highest-grossing Kannada film and her performance earned her the South Indian International Movie (SIIMA) Award for Best Debut Actress. Mandanna later revealed that if the film had failed, she would have had to return home to manage her father's business. Mandanna's 2017 releases—the action film Anjani Putra and the romantic comedy Chamak—brought her further commercial success, though critical reception to these roles was varied. For Chamak, she received her first Best Actress nominations at the Filmfare Awards South and SIIMA.

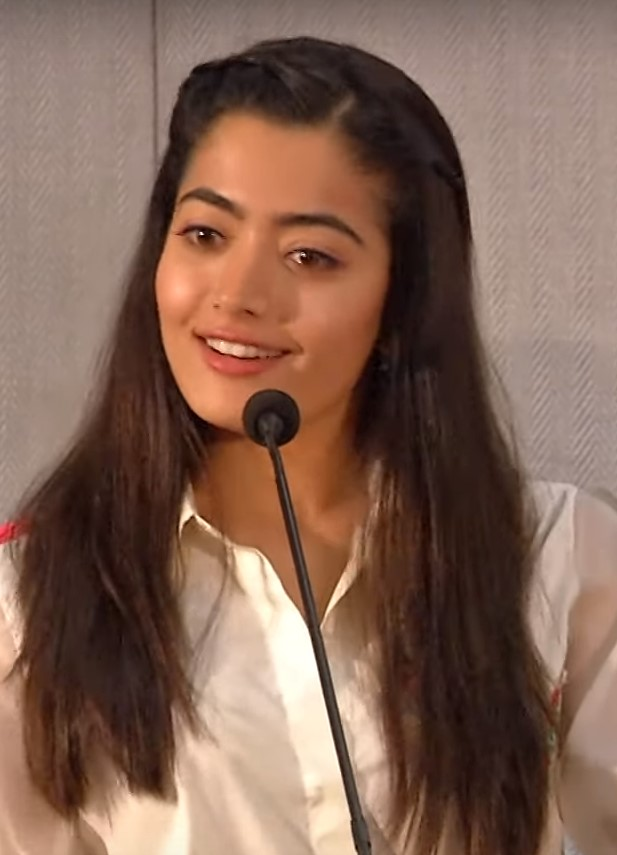
Mandanna at a press conference for Dear Comrade in 2019, for which she won the SIIMA Best Actress award

Expanding into Telugu cinema in 2018, Mandanna starred in the comedy drama Chalo, which follows a Tamil woman who becomes romantically involved with a Telugu man (played by Naga Shaurya) in a segregated village. She initially struggled with learning the new language and sought help from the film's assistant director who assisted her in improving her dialogue delivery. Reception to the film was mixed, but Hemanth Kumar of Firstpost commended Mandanna on a "terrific debut". Chalo emerged as her fourth consecutive box-office success in two years. Mandanna was next cast opposite Vijay Deverakonda in Venky Kudumula's romantic comedy Geetha Govindam. Made on a shoestring budget, the film became her first to cross ₹1 billion (US$13 million) at the domestic box-office, her highest-grosser at that point. Reviewers considered the chemistry between her and Deverakonda to be the highlight of an otherwise formulaic film. She earned the Filmfare Critics Award for Best Actress and gained a Best Actress nomination at the ceremony. Mandanna ended the year with the Telugu feature Devadas, in which reviewers for Sify and The Indian Express found her role in the film to be purely ornamental.

The Kannada social action film Yajamana (2019) the following year had a mixed reception from critics, with Film Companion's Karthik Keramalu highlighting the age gap between Mandanna and Darshan, who is 19 years her senior. Regardless, it proved to be another commercial success for Mandanna. She reunited with Deverakonda for the Telugu romantic drama Dear Comrade in the role of an aspiring cricket player who faces sexism within the sport. Sashidhar Adivi of Deccan Chronicle analysed that the role reflected a shift in Telugu cinema, where actresses were being given more substantial roles rather than serving purely as visual appeal. A departure from the previous lighthearted roles she had become accustomed to, Mandanna had to partake in five months of intensive physical training to accurately emulate a cricket player's body language. Despite high expectations following her previous collaboration with Deverakonda, Dear Comrade underperformed commercially. It also faced extensive criticism from audiences due to a scene featuring a kiss between the lead pair; In response, Mandanna stated that she was carrying out the demands of the script and that a sole scene should not dictate the entire film. She later professed that she struggled with the online backlash that followed the film's release despite its positive critical reception. Regardless, Yajamana and Dear Comrade won Mandanna Best Actress (Critics) awards at SIIMA in Kannada and Telugu, respectively, as well as additional Best Actress nominations in both languages at the ceremony.

She began the new decade opposite Mahesh Babu in the action comedy Sarileru Neekevvaru, which went on to become a top-grossing Telugu film. However, Sangeetha Devi Dundoo of The Hindu bemoaned that her role did not offer her adequate scope to perform as "all she gets to do is fawn over Mahesh". She then starred in the romantic comedy Bheeshma opposite Nithiin, in which Karthik Keramalu found her to continue her streak of featuring in ornamental roles. Still, the film was a commercial success at the box-office and earned Mandanna another nomination for Best Actress (Telugu) at Filmfare.

=== Career expansion and pan-Indian recognition (2021–2025) ===
In 2021, Mandanna starred opposite Dhruva Sarja in Pogaru, which Vivek M V of Deccan Herald termed "a riot of toxic masculinity". In her second release of the year, she made her debut into Tamil cinema opposite Karthi in the action drama Sulthan. She expressed that working across languages is important to her, seeing it as an opportunity to establish herself across industries. Though Hindustan Times' Haricharan Pudipeddi felt that Mandanna had been "sidelined", M Suganth of The Times of India praised her on a "charming debut". It emerged as a moderate commercial success. Mandanna said that her next film, the top-grossing Telugu action film Pushpa: The Rise starring Allu Arjun, was the most significant of her career. For her role as a girl involved in the smuggling syndicate of red sandalwood, she learnt the Chittoor dialect of Telugu with support from a tutor. Film Companion's Mukesh Manjunath found that she did her "best to imbue bubbliness and the innocence required in these testosterone-charged surroundings" but was unimpressed by the brown-facing of her character. The film marked a breakthrough in Mandanna's career as she earned pan-India recognition for the song "Saami Saami", which gained popularity. She received Best Actress nominations for her performance in the film at both SIIMA and Filmfare.

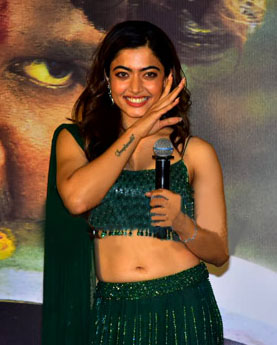
Mandanna at an event for Pushpa: The Rise in 2022

In 2022, Mandanna starred in a string of films that saw varying levels of success. These began with the unremarkable Telugu feature Aadavallu Meeku Johaarlu opposite Sharwanand. Keen to showcase her acting skills after a series of androcentric films, she took on her first supporting role in the romantic drama Sita Ramam starring Dulquer Salmaan and Mrunal Thakur. Citing it as one of her stronger films, Sangeetha Devi Dundoo appreciated that Mandanna is "given the scope to play a self-centred character" and showed that she is willing to take on roles of substance. For her performance, Mandanna received her first nomination for the Best Supporting Actress (Telugu) at Filmfare. The following month, Mandanna debuted into Hindi cinema with Vikas Bahl's family drama Goodbye, where she played a headstrong woman struggling with the aftermath of her mother's (played by Neena Gupta) death. She initially passed on the role as the character's dismissive views on religious rituals clashed with her own beliefs, but Bahl's confidence in her abilities ultimately convinced her. The film was an underwhelming financial venture. Renuka Vyavahare of The Times of India was unimpressed by Mandanna's Hindi diction but felt that she had still managed to retain the "essence" of her Punjabi character. She earned the Zee Cine Award for Best Female Debut for her performance.

The following year saw Mandanna star in three action films—Varisu, Mission Majnu and Animal. Prior to the release of Varisu, she prefaced that it was a "conscious choice" to star in the film despite having a role "with nothing to do" as she was aware of the recognition Vijay's celebrity would bring her. M Suganth concurred that her role was insubstantial and dismissed her presence in the film as merely ornamental. The Hindi spy thriller Mission Majnu featuring Mandanna as a visually-impaired woman opposite Sidharth Malhotra as an Indian spy stationed in Pakistan, premiered digitally on Netflix following several delays in production. In preparation, she participated in intensive workshops to better her understanding on the behaviours of the visually-impaired and found it especially challenging not to be able to look Malhotra in the eyes during their scenes together. In a scathing review for Rediff.com, Sukanya Verma reviewed: "Wearing a nose ring and smiling in response to everything is Rashmika's role in a nutshell".

Impressed by her performance in Pushpa: The Rise, filmmaker Sandeep Reddy Vanga cast Mandanna in Ranbir Kapoor's Animal as Geetanjali, a devoted housewife who learns of her husband's (Kapoor) debauched behaviours. She replaced Parineeti Chopra during filming as Vanga believed that she was better suited for the role. The film's content led certain commentators to accuse the film of glorifying toxic masculinity and misogyny. WION's Shomini Sen praised Mandanna for salvaging a poorly-written character that had been constrained by Vanga's focus on "a skewed version of an alpha male". Mandanna defended her role in the film against criticism that her character condoned misogyny as she believed that the character's actions stemmed from a desire to "protect her family at any cost". Animal ranks as the third highest-grossing Indian film of 2023, earning over ₹9.1 billion (equivalent to ₹9.9 billion or US$110 million in 2026).

In 2024, Mandanna reprised her role as Srivalli in the Telugu action sequel Pushpa 2: The Rule. Nandini Ramnath of Scroll.in was appreciative of her chemistry with Allu Arjun and added that she "has several strong sequences to justify her presence" in an androcentric narrative. The Indian Express's Anandu Suresh was displeased with the hypersexualisation of her role, and took note of a prevailing theme in her filmography of playing the love interest of "unnervingly eccentric" men. Pushpa 2: The Rule set several box-office records for an Indian film, earning over ₹18 billion (US$190 million) worldwide to rank as Indian cinema's fourth biggest-grosser as well as Mandanna's highest grosser. For her performance, she earned another Best Actress (Telugu) award at SIIMA.

Mandanna at an event for Chhava in 2025

Mandanna had five releases in 2025, beginning with the big-budget Hindi action films Chhaava and Sikandar. In the former, a Hindi historical action film directed by Laxman Utekar, she portrayed Maharani Yesubai Bhonsale opposite Vicky Kaushal as Maratha Chhatrapati Sambhaji. To prepare for their roles as Marathi royals, Kaushal and her spent four weeks learning Marathi. A. R. Murugadoss' Sikandar cast her opposite Salman Khan, who is 31 years her senior. Reviewers of both Chhava and Sikandar found Mandanna miscast in the respective roles due to her persistently weak, South-Indian accented Hindi. Nevertheless, Chhaava grossed over ₹8 billion (US$85 million), becoming the second highest-grossing Indian film of the year and making Mandanna the first Indian actress with three films crossing ₹5 billion (US$53 million) domestically. However, Sikandar failed to recoup its high production budget, after which Mandanna said that box-office numbers were not a measure of success for her. Writing for the Indian edition of The Hollywood Reporter, Rahul Desai observed a recurring theme in Mandanna's filmography after these films of "catering to the middle-class Indian patriarch's biggest fantasy" by playing subservient women whose sole purpose is to decorate their husband's masculinity and "cook the carcass of female agency". Responding to criticism regarding her frequent roles in films glorifying toxic masculinity, Mandanna explained that such individuals exist in reality, and their hyperbolic depiction is a "cinematic liberty intended to entertain the audience".

Later in the year, Mandanna featured as what Scroll.in described as the "force-fitted into the plot" love interest of Dhanush's character in Kuberaa, a Telugu-Tamil bilingual film directed by Sekhar Kammula. She next starred alongside Ayushmann Khurrana in Thamma, in which the pair played vampires as part of the Maddock Horror Comedy Universe. Production on Sikandar, Kuberaa and Thamma had been delayed after Mandanna sustained a leg injury during a gym workout in January 2025. It was an underwhelming financial venture, in which Anuj Kumar of The Hindu found her performance to be marked by excessive "wide-eyed exaggeration" and India Today's Vineeta Kumar felt that her Hindi accent continued to falter. However, her subsequent role as a woman trapped in a dysfunctional relationship in The Girlfriend was acclaimed by critics. Mandanna said that the film provided her with an opportunity to move beyond her image as the heroine of big-budget action films and demonstrate her acting range. Sangeetha Devi Dundoo commended the actress for portraying "confusion, restraint, and vulnerability in love" with a "lingering honesty", that made her performance among the finest in her career. The film earned Mandanna another SIIMA award for Best Actress (Telugu), but proved to be a box-office failure.

=== Career progression (2026—present) ===
Mandanna said that her next role as Diya, a woman caught in a love triangle with characters played by Shahid Kapoor and Kriti Sanon, in the Hindi romance Cocktail 2 (2026) marked a deliberate shift in her filmography towards urban cinema. She admitted that she had initially been hesitant to sign the film, fearing that audiences had grown accustomed to seeing her in "very serious and dramatic" roles. Although critics continued to fault her Hindi dialogue delivery, NDTV's Saibal Chatterjee praised her handling of "the more dramatic passages with aplomb". Later that year, Mandanna reunited with her husband in Ranabaali, a Telugu period drama set against the backdrop of the British Raj. Despite her unfavourable assessment of the film, Yashaswini Sri of The Indian Express considered Mandanna the strongest aspect of its second half, praising her restrained performance "without sentimentality [and] melodrama" as well as her chemistry with Deverakonda. However, both Cocktail 2 and Ranabaali underperformed commercially. Mandanna will continue her work in Telugu action films where she will headline Mysaa and feature with Allu Arjun for filmmaker Atlee's Raaka starring Deepika Padukone.

== Personal life ==
Mandanna began dating Rakshit Shetty, her co-star in Kirik Party, during the making of the film, and they announced their engagement on 3 July 2017 at a private party in her hometown Virajpet. They ended their engagement in September 2018, citing compatibility issues.

Rumours about Mandanna dating actor Vijay Deverakonda began circulating in 2020, though she never publicly addressed them. The two became engaged in October 2025. On 26 February 2026, the two were married in Udaipur in traditional Telugu Hindu and Kodava ceremonies. The wedding attracted significant media coverage, with their photos becoming the most-liked Instagram post in India.

== Artistry and media image ==
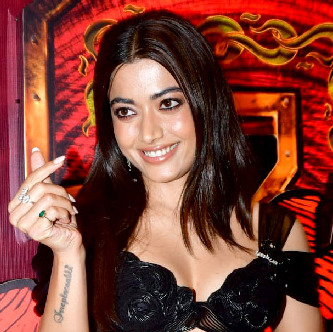
Mandanna at an event for Pushpa 2: The Rule in 2024, for which she earned the SIIMA award for Best Actress

Sneha Menon Desai of Film Companion notes Mandanna's sincerity and "down-to-earth personality", while critic Anupama Chopra, describes her as "intelligent" and acknowledges her ability to resonate with audiences. Sonal Ved of Harper's Bazaar wrote that she "thrives on unpredictability," citing roles across a wide spectrum of genres, from "big-ticket blockbusters to quiet, performance-driven films". Filmmaker Rahul Ravindran described Mandanna as "a director's dream", noting that her physical versatility allows her to fit diverse character profiles without regional constraints. She has described herself as highly committed to her directors' vision, saying that she prioritises fulfilling their expectations and is open to constructive criticism. Relying solely on her instincts when selecting films, Mandanna believes this has benefitted her more than following a strategic career plan.

In 2024, Mandanna was featured by Forbes India in their 30 Under 30 list and the Indian edition of GQ named her among South India's highest-paid actresses. She was placed at the 24th position in Bangalore Times' 25 Most Desirable Women of 2016 and also appeared in the Bangalore Times' 30 Most Desirable women of 2017. As of August 2024, Mandanna is the most-followed South Indian woman on Instagram and she was placed first by Forbes India in their ranking of the most influential South Indian personalities on the platform.

Mandanna is an endorser for several brands and products, including McDonald's, Dabur Honey, Cashify, Kalyan Jewellers and Bisk Farm among others. In 2023, she was made the first Indian ambassador for Japanese fashion brand Onitsuka Tiger. She and Tiger Shroff were named "strategic partners" of American streaming service Crunchyroll for their efforts to expand in India. As an ambassador for Onitsuka Tiger, she attended Milan Fashion Week and walked the runway, while for Crunchyroll, she presented an award at the 8th Crunchyroll Anime Awards in Japan. She serves as both an ambassador and investor for Plum, a vegan beauty and personal care brand. In 2025, she was made the Indian brand ambassador for Swarovski.

In November 2023, a deepfake of Mandanna was posted on the platform X by digital marketer Eemani Naveen. Her face was morphed on to a sexually suggestive Instagram video posted by a British-Indian influencer named Zara Patel. In response, Mandanna released a statement in which she said she was "[scared] not only for me, but also for each one of us who today is vulnerable to so much harm because of how technology is being misused". In December 2023, Delhi Police communicated with Meta to obtain the URL ID associated with the account responsible for generating the video, and filed a First information report in relation to the case. In January 2024, Naveen was arrested; he claimed he had created the deepfake to gain followers on Instagram. In the months following the incident, Mandanna was appointed as the national brand ambassador of the Indian Cyber Crime Coordination Centre.

In October 2026, Mandanna and her husband filed a cybercrime complaint in Hyderabad over online trolling following a Koffee With Karan episode in which they featured.

== Filmography ==
Key
†	Denotes films that have not yet been released

=== Films ===
Year	Title	Role(s)	Language	Notes	Ref.
2016	Kirik Party	Saanvi Joseph	Kannada		
2017	Anjani Putra	Geetha	Kannada		
2017	Chamak	Kushi	Kannada		
2018	Chalo	L. Karthika	Telugu		
2018	Geetha Govindam	Geetha	Telugu	credited as Rashmika	
2018	Devadas	Pooja	Telugu		
2019	Yajamana	Kaveri	Kannada		
2019	Dear Comrade	Aparna "Lilly" Devi	Telugu		
2020	Sarileru Neekevvaru	Samskruthi	Telugu		
2020	Bheeshma	Chaithra	Telugu		
2021	Pogaru	Geetha	Kannada		
2021	Sulthan	Rukmani	Tamil		
2021	Pushpa: The Rise	Srivalli	Telugu		
2022	Aadavallu Meeku Johaarlu	Aadhya	Telugu		
2022	Sita Ramam	Afreen / Waheeda (Note: Mandanna played a single character with two or more names.)	Telugu		
2022	Goodbye	Tara Bhalla	Hindi		
2023	Varisu	Divya	Tamil		
2023	Mission Majnu	Nasreen Hussain	Hindi		
2023	Animal	Geetanjali Singh	Hindi		
2024	Pushpa 2: The Rule	Srivalli	Telugu		
2025	Chhaava	Maharani Yesubai	Hindi		
2025	Sikandar	Saisri Rajkot	Hindi		
2025	Kuberaa	Sameera	Telugu; Tamil	Bilingual film	
2025	Thamma	Tadaka / Tarika	Hindi		
2025	The Girlfriend	Bhooma Devi	Telugu		
2026	Cocktail 2	Diya	Hindi		
2026	Ranabaali	Jayamma	Telugu		
2026	Mysaa †	TBA	Telugu	Filming	
2027	Raaka †	TBA	Telugu	Filming	

=== Music video appearances ===
Year	Song	Language(s)	Artist	Ref.
2021	"Top Tucker"	Tamil; Hindi	Yuvan Shankar Raja, Badshah	

== Awards and nominations ==
Award	Category	Work	Result	Ref.
6th SIIMA Awards	Best Female Debut – Kannada	Kirik Party	Won	
2nd IIFA Utsavam	Best Actress – Kannada	Kirik Party	Nominated	
65th Filmfare Awards South	Best Actress – Kannada	Chamak	Nominated	
7th SIIMA Awards	Best Actress – Kannada	Chamak	Nominated	
8th SIIMA Awards	Best Actress – Telugu	Geetha Govindam	Nominated	
66th Filmfare Awards South	Best Actress – Telugu	Geetha Govindam	Nominated	
66th Filmfare Awards South	Critics Best Actress – Telugu	Geetha Govindam	Won	
9th SIIMA Awards	Best Actress – Telugu	Dear Comrade	Nominated	
9th SIIMA Awards	Critics Best Actress – Telugu	Dear Comrade	Won	
9th SIIMA Awards	Best Actress – Kannada	Yajamana	Nominated	
9th SIIMA Awards	Critics Best Actress – Kannada	Yajamana	Won	
9th SIIMA Awards	Best Actress – Telugu	Sarileru Neekevvaru	Nominated	
10th SIIMA Awards	Best Actress - Kannada	Pogaru	Nominated	
10th SIIMA Awards	Best Actress – Telugu	Pushpa: The Rise	Nominated	
67th Filmfare Awards South	Best Actress – Telugu	Pushpa: The Rise	Nominated	
67th Filmfare Awards South	Best Actress – Telugu	Bheeshma	Nominated	
Lokmat Stylish Awards	Most Stylish Youth Icon	—	Won	
Zee Cine Awards	Best Female Debut	Goodbye	Won	
Bollywood Hungama Style Icons	Most Stylish Breakthrough Talent (Female)	—	Nominated	
68th Filmfare Awards South	Best Supporting Actress – Telugu	Sita Ramam	Nominated	
13th SIIMA Awards	Best Actress – Telugu	Pushpa 2: The Rule	Won	
70th Filmfare Awards South	Best Actress – Telugu	Pushpa 2: The Rule	Nominated	
Telangana Gaddar Film Awards	Best Actress	The Girlfriend	Won	
14th South Indian International Movie Awards	Best Actress – Telugu	The Girlfriend	Won	
