= Kranthi Madhav =

Indian writer and director

- Born: 6th August; Warangal, Telangana, India
- Occupations: Producer, Screenwriter, Director
- Years active: 2012 – present

Kranthi Madhav is an Indian writer and director known for his work in the Telugu film industry. He has directed films like Onamalu, Malli Malli Idi Rani Roju, Ungarala Rambabu, and World Famous Lover.

== Filmography ==
Year	Film	Notes
2012	Onamalu	Also producer
2015	Malli Malli Idhi Rani Roju	
2017	Ungarala Rambabu	
2020	World Famous Lover	
2026	Dil Diya – A Naked Truth	Fliming

== Awards and nominations ==
- CineMAA Award for Best Debut Director
- Chennai Telugu Academy Awards - Best Feature Film
- Santosham Awards - Best Feature Film
- ANR - Abhinandana Awards - Best Feature Film, Best Debut Director
- Bharatamuni Awards - Best Message Oriented Film, Best Debut Director
- Best Home-viewing Feature Film (Gold)

2015 Nandi Awards

- Nominated for Best Director — Telugu in 63rd Filmfare Awards South

== Sources ==
- Kranti Madhav
- I was inspired by my professor: Kranthi Madhav
- Kranthi Madhav interview - Telugu film director
