= Vijay Deverakonda =

Indian actor and film producer (born 1989)

- Deverakonda at Liger promotions, 2022.
- Born: Deverakonda Vijay Sai; 9 May 1989 (age 37); Hyderabad, Andhra Pradesh, (present day Telangana), India
- Education: Badruka College of Commerce & Arts (B Com)
- Occupations: Actor; film producer
- Years active: 2011–present
- Spouse: Rashmika Mandanna (m. 2026)
- Relatives: Anand Deverakonda (brother)

Deverakonda Vijay Sai (born 9 May 1989), better known as Vijay Deverakonda, is an Indian actor and film producer who works in Telugu films. Deverakonda is the recipient of a Filmfare Award, a Nandi Award and three SIIMA Awards.

Deverakonda made his debut with Nuvvila (2011) and received praise for his supporting role in the coming-of-age drama Yevade Subramanyam (2015). He rose to prominence as a leading film actor by starring in Pelli Choopulu (2016) and Arjun Reddy (2017), winning the Filmfare Award for Best Actor – Telugu for his performance as a volatile surgeon in the latter. He further established himself with commercially successful films such as Mahanati (2018), Geetha Govindam (2018), and Taxiwaala (2018). This success was followed by a series of poorly received films.

In 2019, Deverakonda launched his own production house King of the Hill Entertainment, which produced Meeku Maathrame Cheptha (2019) and Pushpaka Vimanam (2021). Beyond his film career, Deverakonda has designed his own fashion brand Rowdy Wear, which launched on Myntra in 2020, and is the co-owner of the volleyball team Hyderabad Black Hawks. Deverakonda is also a celebrity endorser for numerous products and supports various humanitarian causes. He is married to actress Rashmika Mandanna.

== Early life ==
Deverakonda Vijay Sai was born in Hyderabad, Andhra Pradesh (present-day Telangana) to Govardhan Rao and Madhavi. His family hails from Thummanpeta village of erstwhile Mahbubnagar district (present day Nagarkurnool). His father was a television serial director who quit doing them due to lack of success. His younger brother, Anand Deverakonda, is also an actor in Telugu cinema.

Deverakonda completed his 10th Class from Sri Sathya Sai Higher Secondary School, Puttaparthi. After that he completed his 12th Class at the Little Flower Junior College, Hyderabad. He holds a BCom Degree from Badruka College of Commerce & Arts.

Vijay Deverakonda and his family lived in Saroornagar, Hyderabad before he entered the Telugu film industry.

== Career ==
=== Early career (2011–2015) ===
Deverakonda made his debut with Ravi Babu-directed romantic comedy Nuvvila (2011). He later appeared in Sekhar Kammula's Life is Beautiful (2012) in a minor role. He was introduced to Nag Ashwin, who later cast him in a supporting role for the 2015 coming-of-age drama Yevade Subramanyam alongside actor Nani. The film was produced by the daughters of Ashwini Dutt, a producer in the Telugu film industry; Priyanka Dutt backed him and once shooting started, Swapna Dutt signed him onto her company.

Vijay Devarakonda at Geetha Govindam Interview, 2018.

=== Breakthrough and commercial success (2016–2018) ===
Deverakonda's first lead role was in Pelli Choopulu, a coming-of-age romance film directed by Tharun Bhascker. The film became commercially successful and won the Filmfare Award for Best Film – Telugu and the Best Feature Film in Telugu at the 64th National Film Awards. He starred in the masala film Dwaraka in 2017. He next starred in the romantic drama Arjun Reddy which received both praise and criticism for being bold and radical. However, his portrayal of a self-destructive, short-tempered, and alcoholic surgeon received widespread critical acclaim, and won him the Filmfare Award for Best Actor – Telugu. In 2019, Film Companion ranked Deverakonda's performance in Arjun Reddy in "100 Greatest Performances of the Decade".

Deverakonda starred in multiple films in 2018, the first of which was the delayed Ye Mantram Vesave, which was initially supposed to release in 2013. He played a pivotal role in the notable biographical film Mahanati, based on the life of actress Savitri. Deverakonda's most successful release of 2018 was Geetha Arts' romantic comedy Geetha Govindam, in which he played a naive and nervous college professor alongside Rashmika Mandanna. The film received mixed-to-positive reviews upon release, and proved to his highest-grossing release grossing ₹130 crore worldwide. He next appeared in the Tamil political thriller NOTA, directed by Anand Shankar, which performed poorly at the box office. His final film in 2018 was UV Creations' supernatural comedy thriller Taxiwaala, which garnered good box office returns.

=== Career decline and setback (2019–present) ===
In 2019, Deverakonda was seen in Bharat Kamma's Dear Comrade, a romantic action drama, alongside Rashmika Mandanna. He later signed Hero, directed by Anand Annamalai co-starring Malavika Mohanan but the film was reportedly shelved after beginning production. In 2020, he acted in Kranthi Madhav's romantic drama World Famous Lover opposite Raashii Khanna, Catherine Tresa, Aishwarya Rajesh, and Izabelle Leite which opened to negative reviews. In 2022, he acted in the Hindi–Telugu bilingual film Liger which was directed by Puri Jagannadh and produced by Karan Johar which also opened to highly negative reviews. He then starred in Kushi which was directed by Shiva Nirvana and it opened to mixed reviews. The film was an average grosser at the box office. In 2024, Deverakonda starred in The Family Star, which was a box-office bomb. Late that year, he was seen in a cameo appearance as the warrior Arjuna in Nag Ashwin's science-fiction epic Kalki 2898 AD. In 2025, he starred in Gowtam Tinnanuri's film, Kingdom, which was an average grosser. In 2026, he has two releases: Ranabaali, directed by Rahul Sankrityan, is releasing on 11 September 2026, while Rowdy Janardhana, directed by Ravikiran Kola, is releasing in December 2026.

== Personal life ==
Rumours about Deverakonda dating actress Rashmika Mandanna began circulating in 2020, though he never publicly addressed them. The two became engaged in October 2025. On 26 February 2026, the two were married in Udaipur in traditional Telugu Hindu and Kodava ceremonies. The wedding attracted significant media coverage, with their photos becoming the most-liked Instagram post in India.

In October 2026, Devarakonda and his wife filed a cybercrime complaint in Hyderabad over online trolling following a Koffee With Karan episode in which they featured.

== Philanthropy and other work ==
Deverakonda was the brand ambassador of food delivery app Zomato. On 15 October 2018, he launched his fashion brand Rowdy Wear. Later, in 2020 Rowdy Wear was launched on Myntra. Deverakonda has donated to relief funds, including a donation to families of victims in the 2019 Pulwama attack.

Deverakonda conceptualised and founded The Deverakonda Foundation, a nonprofit organisation in April 2019. In early 2020, he donated ₹24,000 through the Foundation to help Ganesh Ambari, a kickboxer who won the Vaco Indian Open International Kick-boxing Championship Title 2020. An initiative was started to battle COVID-19 pandemic crisis. The foundation has successfully aided 17,000 middle-class families with their groceries and basic essentials, spending ₹1.7 crores, with the help of his Middle Class Fund (MCF). More than 8,500 volunteers donated over ₹1.5 crores to join his community effort. Organisers decided to end the initiative on 2 June 2020. Devarkonda opened his first multiplex theatre in Mahbubnagar in 2021.

=== Controversies ===
In June 2025, a case under the SC/ST Act was filed against him for his alleged "racially insensitive" comments against the tribal community following the Pahalgam terror attack.

On 11 November 2025, Deverakonda, and Prakash Raj were questioned by the Crime Investigation Department (CID) in connection with an ongoing investigation into the alleged promotion of online betting apps. As of November 2025, the case is still under investigation.

== In the media ==
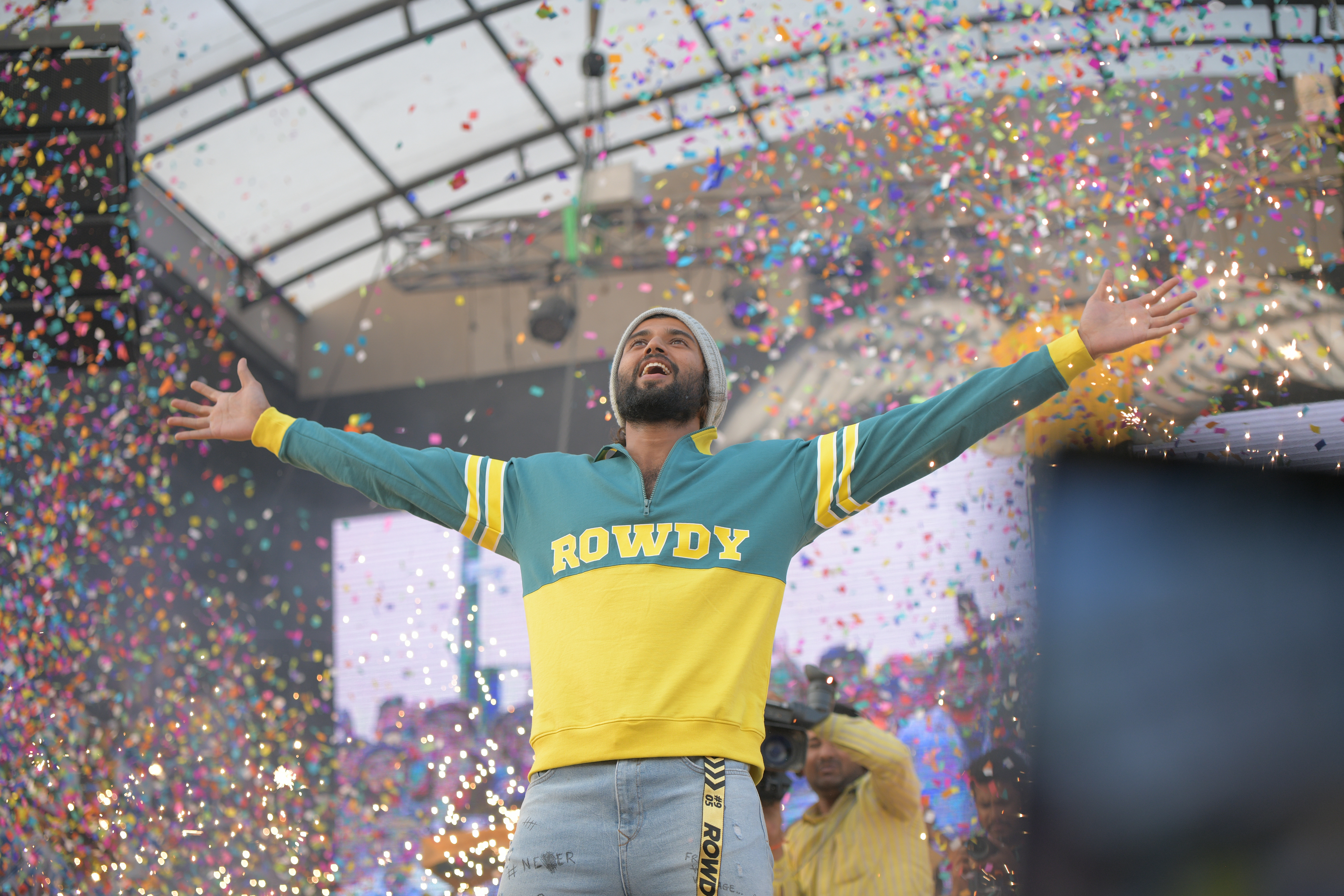
Deverakonda at Rowdy Sundowner Party 2020

Deverakonda says his family used to call him a rowdy every time he did something that they did not approve of. Over time, he started using this term for himself and his fans. Deverakonda is known to express his real, honest, and unfiltered opinions on stage or during interviews, for which he has gathered a lot of popularity and criticism, as seen during his speech at the audio launch of Arjun Reddy, in 2017.

Deverakonda placed 72nd in the Forbes India Celebrity 100 list of 2018. He was ranked in The Times Most Desirable Men at No. 4 in 2018, at No. 3 in 2019, at No. 2 in 2020. He was additionally featured by Forbes India in their 30 Under 30 list, and became the most-searched South Indian actor according to Google's annual report. As of August 2024, he is one of the most-followed Telugu actors on Instagram.

== Filmography ==
Key
†	Denotes films that have not yet been released

=== As an actor ===
- All films are in Telugu, otherwise noted

List of Vijay Devarakonda film credits
Year	Title	Role(s)	Notes	Ref.
2011	Nuvvila	Vishnuvardhan "Vishnu"	Credited as Vijay Sai	
2012	Life Is Beautiful	Ajay		
2015	Yevade Subramanyam	Rishi		
2016	Pelli Choopulu	Prashanth	Debut as Lead Actor	
2017	Dwaraka	Erra Srinu aka Sri Krishnananda Swamy		
2017	Arjun Reddy	Dr. Arjun Reddy Deshmukh	Credited as Devarakonda Vijay Sai	
2018	Ye Mantram Vesave	Nikhil "Nikki"	Delayed film; shot in 2013	
2018	Mahanati	Vijay Anthony		
2018	Geetha Govindam	Vijay Govind	Also singer for "What the Life"	
2018	NOTA	Varun Subramanyam	Tamil film	
2018	Ee Nagaraniki Emaindhi	Himself	Cameo appearance	
2018	Taxiwaala	Shiva Rawaali		
2019	Dear Comrade	Chaitanya "Bobby" Krishna		
2019	Meeku Maathrame Cheptha	Himself	Cameo appearance; also producer	
2020	World Famous Lover	Gautham / Seenayya "Srinu" Prajapat		
2021	Jathi Ratnalu	Court attendee	Cameo appearance	
2022	Liger	Lion Tiger Balram Agarwal / Sashwath Agarwal (Liger)	Hindi-Telugu bilingual film	
2023	Kushi	Viplav		
2024	The Family Star	Govardhan		
2024	Kalki 2898 AD	Arjuna	Cameo appearance	
2025	Kingdom	Constable Surya "Suri"		
2026	Sing Geetham	Business mogul	Cameo appearance	
2026	Ranabaali	Singanamala Bobbili Ranabaali		
2026	Rowdy Janardhana †	Rowdy Janardhana	Filming	

=== As a producer ===
List of Vijay Devarakonda film credits
Year	Title	Notes	Ref.
2019	Meeku Maathrame Cheptha		
2021	Pushpaka Vimanam		

=== Television ===
Year	Title	Role	Network	Notes	Ref.
2022	Dance Ikon	Guest	aha	As part of Liger promotions	

=== Music video ===
Year	Song	Language(s)	Artist	Ref.
2018	"Nee Venakale Nadichi"	Telugu	Chinmayi Sripada	
2024	"Sahiba"	Hindi	Jasleen Royal feat. Stebin Ben	

== Awards and nominations ==
List of Vijay Deverakonda awards and nominations
Year	Award	Category	Title	Result	Ref.
2015	Nandi Awards	Special Jury Award	Yevade Subramanyam	Won	
2017	Zee Golden Awards	Best Actor	Arjun Reddy	Won	
2018	Filmfare Awards South	Best Actor – Telugu	Arjun Reddy	Won	
2018	South Indian International Movie Awards	Best Actor (Telugu)	Arjun Reddy	Nominated	
2019	South Indian International Movie Awards	Best Actor (Telugu)	Geetha Govindam	Nominated	
2019	South Indian International Movie Awards	Best Actor (Critics) – Telugu	Geetha Govindam	Won	
2019	Filmfare Awards South	Best Actor – Telugu	Geetha Govindam	Nominated	
2022	South Indian International Movie Awards	Youth Icon South (Male)	—N/a	Won	
