= Dear Comrade =

2019 Indian film by Bharat Kamma

- Theatrical release poster
- Directed by: Bharat Kamma
- Written by: Dialogues: Jayakrishna
- Screenplay by: Bharat Kamma
- Story by: Bharat Kamma
- Produced by: Naveen Yerneni; Yalamanchili Ravi Shankar; Mohan Cherukuri (CVM); Yash Rangineni
- Starring: Vijay Deverakonda; Rashmika Mandanna; Shruti Ramachandran
- Cinematography: Sujith Sarang
- Edited by: Sreejith Sarang
- Music by: Justin Prabhakaran
- Production companies: Mythri Movie Makers; Big Ben Cinemas
- Distributed by: Big Ben Cinemas
- Release date: 26 July 2019
- Running time: 170 minutes
- Country: India
- Language: Telugu

Dear Comrade is a 2019 Indian Telugu-language romantic action drama film written and directed by Bharat Kamma (in his directorial debut). It is produced by Mythri Movie Makers and Big Ben Cinemas. The film stars Vijay Deverakonda, Rashmika Mandanna and Shruti Ramachandran (in her Telugu debut). Principal photography for the film commenced in August 2018. The film was theatrically released on 26 July 2019 in Telugu along with dubbed versions in Tamil, Malayalam, Kannada.

== Plot ==
Bobby is a leftist student union leader with anger management issues. He fights with a local politician, Bulliah's brother, who had caused a girl from his college to attempt suicide due to repeated harassment. Bobby runs into Lilly, who causes him a minor accident while returning from lock-up. He learns that Lilly is his childhood friend, the cousin of his neighbour Jaya. Bobby falls in love with Lilly. However, she tells him to resolve conflicts internally rather than engage in fights and shares that her brother died in a college fight.

During Jaya's marriage, Bobby confesses his love for Lilly but is rejected by her. Bobby agrees to rectify his excessive aggression. Their love blossoms until Bobby is drawn into a fight with Bulliah's brother's gang, leading to Bulliah's brother's death. Lilly advises Bobby to give up his violent ways. She gives him an ultimatum to choose between his anger and her. Bobby loses his temper and pushes Lilly out of the hospital, telling her to get lost. Later, he realises his mistake and tries to reach out to Lilly. He leaves home to find inner peace and joins a group working on a sound healing project.

Three years later, Bobby and his team go to Hyderabad to meet a doctor. They see Jaya and her husband, who ask Bobby if he visited Lilly in the hospital. Bobby learns that Lilly had an accident. He takes her on a road trip to heal her. Lilly returns to her house and meets the doctor, who warns her of hidden pain inside. Bobby dismisses this and gives her his digital voice recorder to listen to if she feels pain. They are invited to their friends' wedding, where Lilly is impressed by Bobby's newfound maturity. She asks Bobby to marry her, but Bobby states there is no urgency for their marriage. To his surprise, Lilly reveals that she has given up cricket for good.

One day, Bobby spots Lilly's former teammate and friend Rubina, who tells him the truth: Lilly's team won a high-profile tournament and was named the "best player". Ramesh Rao, a south-zone selector for BCCI, demanded Lilly sleep with him to get selected for the national team. Lilly refused to lodge a complaint due to fear of confrontation, but Rubina complained on her behalf. Rao physically assaulted both Lilly and Rubina. Bobby becomes furious but breaks down in front of Lilly, apologising for leaving her, and Lilly is touched. Bobby takes her to the police station, where he lodges an official complaint against Rao.

Lilly decides to meet with a prospective groom her family has arranged for her, and Bobby tries to convince her not to run away from his life. However, Lilly blames him for not being around when she really needed him. She tells Bobby she would forget him in a few years. Bobby then leaves Lilly. She gets confirmation of her marriage and is consumed by the prospect of losing Bobby forever. She desperately reaches out for Bobby's old voice recorder, which contained his messages to her over the years.

The video footage of Bobby assaulting Rao goes viral. Lilly and her family are now thrust into the media's limelight, and the BCCI appoints a committee to investigate the allegations against Rao. The police officer investigating a sexual assault case arrests Bobby. He refuses to let Bobby off and coerces Lilly into lying for his release. Lilly's deposition before the BCCI committee reveals she was not sexually harassed by Rao. Rao insults both Bobby and Lilly in court, demanding an apology for false allegations. Lilly, enraged, attacks Rao and confesses to being sexually harassed by him, abusing his position as a selector. They reunite, embracing their true selves. The film ends with Bobby dropping Lilly at the National Cricket Academy for her practice.

== Cast ==
- Vijay Devarakonda as Chaitanya Krishna "Bobby" Makineni
- Rashmika Mandanna as Aparna "Lilly" Devi
- Shruti Ramachandran as Jaya, Lilly's cousin
- Raj Arjun as Ramesh Rao
- Suhas as Martin
- Kaali Venkat as Veluthambi
- Vikas as Raghu
- Divya Sripada as Anitha, Raghu's girlfriend
- Vinay Mahadev as opposite gang
- Charuhasan as Bobby's grandfather
- Anand as Bobby's father
- Kalyani Natarajan as Bobby's mother
- Viva Harsha as Bheema
- Pratyusha Jonnalagadda as Rubina
- Tulasi as Jaya's mother
- S. S. Kanchi as Jaya's father
- Sanjay Swaroop as Lilly's father
- Ashrita Vemuganti as Lilly's mother
- Srikanth Iyyengar as Police Officer
- Rafsan Shahriar

== Production ==
=== Development ===
In May 2018, it was reported that Vijay Deverakonda will join with debutant director Bharat Kamma for a new film. The first look poster of the film was unveiled on Devarakonda's birthday, 9 May 2018, with the title Dear Comrade, also being announced. While sources claimed that the film will be a remake of Malayalam movie Comrade in America (2017) starring Dulquer Salmaan as the protagonist, the director and actor denied its connection with the movie. Rashmika Mandanna, was selected to play the female lead, collaborating with Deverakonda for the second time, after Geetha Govindam (2018). Vijay Devarakonda plays the lead role of a student leader, while Rashmika essayed the role of a female cricketer. After completing the pre-production work by its month end, the team planned to kickstart the film's shoot in June 2018, but was delayed further, in order to complete the shooting commitments, of the other lead actors, while the team used to finalise, other principal cast and crew. In July 2019, it was reported that Sai Pallavi was earlier chosen for the film's female lead. However, she rejected the script due to the lip-lock scenes between the lead actors.

=== Filming ===
The film's pooja ceremony was launched on 2 July 2018. Apart from the film's cast and crew, M. M. Keeravani provided the first clap for the film while Chandra Sekhar Yeleti switched on the camera. Bharat handed the script to directors Sukumar and Koratala Siva. Principal photography began very soon after the launch. However, production further delayed, due to the actor's involvement in other projects. The film's second schedule took place in Kakinada in December 2018, after the completion of the first schedule. The shoot came to a halt, after Vijay faced an injury while boarding a running train, as a part of the film's scene. The actor also suffered from fever and exhaustion, while shooting the film, which led him to be hospitalised, which further delayed the film. Filming was completed on 28 April 2019.

== Release ==
The film was originally scheduled to release on 31 May 2019, was postponed in order to avoid clash with Suriya's NGK. On 9 May 2019, Deverakonda announced that the film will be released on 26 July 2019 in Telugu, Tamil, Kannada and Malayalam languages.

The film was also dubbed and released in Hindi on YouTube by Goldmines Telefilms on 19 January 2020.

== Marketing ==
The official teaser of the film was released on 17 March 2019, landed in controversy, after both the lead actors being trolled over the kissing scene featured in the clip. Rashmika stated in response to the controversy, that since the particular scene in the film demanded a lip lock scene, it is a responsibility for an actor to do justice for the role. She further added, "No movie should be judged solely on the basis of a lip-lock scene. It should be seen as a whole."

A promotional event titled Dear Comrade Music Festival, took place across Bengaluru, Cochin, Chennai and Hyderabad, for the film's marketing purposes. The film's marketing team announced its collaboration with Airtel India, as their sponsor.

== Reception ==
=== Critical response ===
Hemanth Kumar of Firstpost said that the film is "an intense but uneven film". Giving the film a 3/5, he adds, "Dear Comrade is beautifully written and the love story between the two characters is sheer magic, but then it straddles between two worlds that are loosely held together" Sudhir Srinivasan of The New Indian Express gave the film a 4.5/5 by praising the movie for its direction and the acting of its leading roles. Writing for The Times of India, Suhas Yellapantula gave 3.5 stars and said that the film "makes you think, keeps you guessing and plays with your emotions. After the film, there's a good chance you'll walk out with your collar up and ready to raise your voice against anything that doesn't sit right with you — even if it's just for a while." Janani K of India Today wrote that "Vijay Deverakonda and Rashmika Mandanna's Dear Comrade is about the relationship between two contrasting characters. While the film addresses an important message on sexual harassment, it gets hidden under mass moments. Watch it for the performances. Director Bharat Kamma had a solid script in hand, and a relevant one at that." Sangeetha Devi Dundoo of The Hindu wrote, "Rashmika Mandanna and Vijay Deverakonda shine in director Bharat Kamma's film that underlines the importance of being a comrade". Karthik Kumar, in his review for Hindustan Times, gave 3.5 stars out of five and wrote that "Dear Comrade does tumble towards the end with a slightly below par climax, but it's still an effort you want to appreciate. The film, about life, love and facing our worst fears, achieves more than one can imagine, and that's what makes it a winner."

=== Box office ===
Dear Comrade collected around ₹18 crore on its opening day. It collected ₹30-33 crore in the first weekend. According to International Business Times, Dear Comrade grossed a total of ₹37.33 crores till the end of the year 2019.

== Remake ==
Filmmaker Karan Johar acquired the rights of producing a Hindi remake of the film.
