= World Famous Lover =

2020 Indian film by Kranthi Madhav

- Theatrical release poster
- Directed by: Kranthi Madhav
- Written by: Kranthi Madhav
- Produced by: K. A. Vallabha; K. S. Rama Rao
- Starring: Vijay Deverakonda; Raashii Khanna; Aishwarya Rajesh; Catherine Tresa; Izabelle Leite
- Cinematography: Jaya Krishna Gummadi
- Edited by: Kotagiri Venkateswara Rao
- Music by: Gopi Sundar
- Production company: Creative Commercials
- Release date: 14 February 2020
- Running time: 148 minutes
- Country: India
- Language: Telugu

World Famous Lover is a 2020 Indian Telugu-language romantic drama film written and directed by Kranthi Madhav. The film stars Vijay Deverakonda in a double role alongside, Raashii Khanna, Aishwarya Rajesh, Catherine Tresa and Izabelle Leite. It is produced by K. A. Vallabha under the banner of Creative Commercials.

The film was panned by the critics and audience though Aishwarya Rajesh's performances was praised. The film was a box office disaster.

== Plot ==
The film begins with Gautham in a prison saying that he too has a story to tell. The film cuts to Yamini and Gautham's story. They are in a live-in relationship. Gautham is pursuing his dream of becoming a writer. Yamini takes care of Gautham like a mother and is always supportive of his decisions. But she doesn't see him putting in any effort for his dream and is fed up with her routine life. She eventually breaks up with Gautham.

This makes Gauthum start writing again and he writes a story that takes place in Yellandu. The protagonist Srinu is a union leader in the coal mines and is married to Suvarna unwillingly and the couple has a 5-year-old son. The newly appointed officer, Ms. Smitha gets close to Srinu, unaware that he is married. Srinu does not disclose his marital status either and starts to avoid his own wife Suvarna. Suvarna suspects that her husband is having an extra-marital affair but doesn't confront him. Instead, she decides to pursue her career. She tops her examinations and it is published in the local newspaper, causing Smitha realise that Srinu is married, that too with a son. Srinu upon rushing home finds Suvarna in a modern dress. She tells him that she'll be whatever he wants her to be, including wearing revealing clothes and make-up. All this made Srinu understand his mistake and go back to loving his wife. The story ends with a note from Gautham saying that Srinu sacrificed everything to be with his wife.

Now, the story cuts back to the present where Gautham recalls his past on how he first encountered Yamini and how they fell in love. The next morning, he goes to meet Yamini in her office to tell her that he has started writing again, but Yamini asks him to leave. Another glimpse from his past is shown when Gautham and Yamini used to work in the same office. Yamini was going to be terminated and Gautham was going to get a promotion to work in Paris. Instead, he resigns the job requesting the manager to retain Yamini's position. The film again cuts back to the present where Gautham says that if he hadn't resigned from his job, he would have been in Paris right now. This inspires him to write another story that takes place in Paris.

In Paris, Gautham is working in a radio station, he loves parachuting. He falls in love with his neighbour Iza, a pilot. On Iza's birthday, she wanted something memorable, so Gautham takes her for bike racing which ends in a tragic accident where Iza loses her eyesight. After six months, she gets a compatible eye donor and regains her vision. It is revealed that Gautham was the one who donated his eyes for Iza and he tells her to return to him if she realised his love. This story ends with a note saying that Gautham sacrificed his vision for love.

The film cuts to the present when Yamini comes to visit Gautham to invite him to her wedding, which is in 3 days. A frustrated Gautham yells at Yamini and she leaves the house. Gautham later goes to Yamini's house to try and convince her in vain. On his way home he gets into a fight with a random guy and ends up in prison for bashing his head with a rock. After 2 years Gautham is released and his friend publishes his book on behalf of Gautham, named "The World Famous Lover". Gautham attends the press meet of his book's success event while the public eagerly waits for the unfinished climax of the story. On stage, he recounts his tale stating that upon returning from jail Yamini waits for him and they both live happily ever after, whereas, in reality, no one was waiting for him. He says that it is always been Yamini who compromised. And even in Srinu's story, it is Suvarna who always compromised and not her husband. In the Paris love story, the sacrifice made by Gautham came from the sacrifice made by Yamini in real life. He concludes the press meet by saying that he wants Yamini to be happy wherever she is.

Later, Yamini's father reveals to Gautham that when Yamini learned that he had been arrested, she called off her wedding. He then leaves his daughter to Gautham. Gautham asks for forgiveness. She forgives him and asks if he knows the route to his home. He nods, implying yes. The film ends with Gautham and Yamini reuniting.

== Cast ==
- Vijay Deverakonda in a double role as
  - Gautham
  - Seenayya "Srinu"
- Raashii Khanna as Yamini, Gautam's love interest
- Aishwarya Rajesh as Suvarna, Srinu's wife
- Catherine Tresa as Smitha, Srinu's boss
- Izabelle Leite as Iza, gautam's neighbour in paris
- Jayaprakash as Murthy, Yamini's father
- Priyadarshi as Gautham's friend
- Shatru as Patnaik
- Ananda Chakrapani as Seenayya's father
- Mou Rahman as Resmika
- Aditya Jonnawada as a student

== Production ==
=== Development ===
Kranthi Madhav started talks with Vijay Devarakonda for his upcoming film with Creative Commercials attached to produce the film. By October everything was set in place and film officially launched on 18 October 2018 on the occasion of Dusshera. The ceremony was graced by film's cast and crew along with T. Subbarami Reddy as main guest.

=== Casting ===
In the launch event it was announced that Raashi Khanna, Aishwarya Rajesh and Izabelle Leite are set to co star Vijay in un disclosed roles. In January 2019, Catherine Tresa was announced to join the cast.

=== Filming ===
The production on film started in February 2019 at Yellandu of Khammam district. In June 2019, a schedule was filmed in France with Vijay.

== Soundtrack ==
World Famous Lover

Soundtrack album by Gopi Sundar
- Released: 6 February 2020
- Recorded: 2019
- Genre: Feature film soundtrack
- Language: Telugu
- Label: Aditya Music
- Producer: Gopi Sundar

Gopi Sundar chronology
Choosi Choodangaane (2020)	World Famous Lover (2020)	Most Eligible Bachelor (2020)

Singles from World Famous Lover
- 1. "My Love" Released: 20 January 2020; 2. "Boggu Ganilo" Released: 29 January 2020

=== Telugu ===
Track list
No.	Title	Lyrics	Singer(s)	Length
1.	"My Love"	Rehman	Sri Krishna, Ramya Behara	3:37
2.	"Boggu Ganilo"	Ramajogayya Sastry	Niranj Suresh	3:00
3.	"Raletti"	Sreshta	Divya S. Menon	4:30
4.	"Comosava Paris"	Ramajogayya Sastry	Benny Dayal	2:30
5.	"Mana Kadha"	Ramajogayya Sastry	L. V. Revanth	3:00
Total length:				17:07

=== Tamil ===
Track list
No.	Title	Lyrics	Singer(s)	Length
1.	"My Love"	Pa. Vijay	Saindhavi, Sarath Santhosh	3:47

=== Malayalam ===
Track list
No.	Title	Length
1.	"My Love"	3:33
2.	"Vaanam Varnagal"	3:00
3.	"Kanneeru Nirayunna"	4:30
4.	"Chirithookum Paris"	1:25
5.	"Kathayithu"	2:37
Total length:		15:05

== Release ==
The film was released on Valentine's Day 2020. Apart from Telugu, the film was released in Malayalam, Tamil.

== Home media ==
The film was released on Netflix and Sun NXT on 15 April 2020 with English Subtitles.

== Box office ==
World Famous Lover grossed ₹9.3 crore on the day of release, and ₹16 crore in its first weekend at the worldwide box office.

== Critical reception ==
The film received negative reviews from critics. Writing for Times of India, Suhas Yellapantula gave 2 out of 5 stars and wrote that "World Famous Lover comes across as a caustic rant of a disgruntled writer who subjects the audience to two hours and 36 minutes of his tears and frustration. Vijay Deverakonda yells, cries, punches mirrors, bangs his head against rocks, speaks Telangana dialect, and jumps off planes, but he remains a helpless spectator as Kranthi Madhav tires the audience with his gloomy love story. Aishwarya Rajesh stands out among the women with a powerful performance."

Janani K of India Today rated 2 out of 5 and wrote that "Director Kranthi Madhav’s World Famous Lover aims to be an emotional love story that speaks about compromise and sacrifice. Sadly, the film doesn’t have much substance to keep it going for two and a half hours."

The New Indian Express wrote that "The director has been unable to make an impression with his script which is filled with heavy melodrama and contrived emotions".Baradwaj Rangan of Film Companion South wrote "More annoyingly, writing this story doesn’t seem to have given Gautham any kind of catharsis. When we return to the present day, to the real-life Gautham, he is still Arjun Reddy the angsty wallower he was when Yamini left him."
