= Geetha Govindam =

2018 Indian film by Parasuram

Geetha Govindham
- Theatrical release poster
- Directed by: Parasuram
- Written by: Parasuram
- Produced by: Bunny Vas
- Starring: Vijay Deverakonda; Rashmika Mandanna
- Cinematography: S. Manikandan
- Edited by: Marthand K. Venkatesh
- Music by: Gopi Sundar
- Production company: GA2 Pictures
- Distributed by: Geetha Arts
- Release date: 15 August 2018
- Running time: 142 minutes
- Country: India
- Language: Telugu
- Budget: ₹5 crore
- Box office: est. ₹132 crore

Geetha Govindam is a 2018 Indian Telugu-language romantic comedy film written and directed by Parasuram. Produced by GA2 Pictures, the film stars Vijay Deverakonda and Rashmika Mandanna in lead roles.

Released on 15 August 2018, it is a huge commercial success, grossing ₹132 crore on a budget of ₹5 crore. Though critics felt that it was a "tried and tested story", the film received praise for its direction, performances, and production values.

== Plot ==
At midnight, Nithya's car breaks down. She seeks help from a bypasser Vijay Govind, who places a condition that he should get a bottle of alcohol. He starts to narrate his story.

Vijay is a traditional lecturer who sees a woman named Geetha at a temple and falls for her. He boards a bus to Kakinada, his hometown, when he hears that his sister Sireesha's marriage is arranged. He realizes that Geetha is his co-passenger.

With the suggestions of his friend, Vijay befriends and then woos Geetha. He tries to take a selfie with her when she is sleeping, but the driver applies the brakes at the exact second and Vijay accidentally kisses Geetha. Geetha wakes up, and, feeling violated, calls her brother Phaneendra for help. When Geetha refuses to listen to Vijay's justifications, he manages to jump out of the bus and escape before Phaneendra could deal with him. Vijay attends Sirisha's engagement and is shocked to learn that the groom is Phaneendra. Geetha, not wanting to punish Sireesha for her brother's mistake, pretends like she never met Vijay, and warns him to change his ways.

The two families put Vijay and Geetha in charge of many wedding duties, forcing them to work together, much to the latter's dismay. Throughout the time they travel, Vijay repeatedly apologizes, but Geetha continues to blame, misunderstand, and taunt him.

Meanwhile, Vijay's student, Neelu, crushes on him. When he rejects her advances, she sends him a video of her to seduce him. Geetha sees this and is disgusted; when she questions Vijay's upbringing, Vijay reacts violently and asks her to get out of his car in the middle of the road, although he checks on her later. After being insulted by one of his relatives, Phaneendra is hell-bent on finding the culprit who misbehaved with Geetha, and arrives at Hyderabad, much to Vijay's dismay.

While distributing cards, Geetha sees Neelu's mother and tells her about the video, but the latter reveals that on the same night, Vijay barged into their residence, counseled Neelu, and told her that he truly loves Geetha. Impressed, Geetha starts to fall for Vijay. Although she continues taunting him, she convinces her brother to go back to Kakinada.

When Geetha's grandfather suffers from a stroke, her grandmother insists Geetha should be married soon, before he dies. Phaneendra suggests Vijay as the groom, and the family happily accepts. Vijay meets Geetha privately and tells her that he cannot marry her as he is afraid they might keep fighting life-long, and he does not want to be simply a "choice" for Geetha. Geetha is heartbroken. Her grandmother is furious and arranges Geetha's marriage with a traditional man, Kishore.

When Vijay learns that Phaneendra suggested him as a groom to Geetha, he realizes he cannot keep cheating his brother-in-law and confesses. Phaneendra reveals that Geetha already told him the truth. He tells Vijay that after learning his true personality, Geetha fell in love with him, and Vijay was never just a choice to her. Vijay realizes he made a mistake and tries to convince Geetha to stop the marriage but fails.

Vijay is done narrating and tells Nithya that Geetha's marriage is in a few hours and he does not know what to do. Nithya gives him an idea to go and fall at Phaneendra's feet, beg him to marry Geetha to him, and refuse to budge until he agrees. The plan works, and the movie ends with Geetha kissing Vijay on their bus ride home.

== Cast ==
- Vijay Deverakonda as Vijay Govind
- Rashmika Mandanna as Geetha Kanuganti
- Subbaraju as Phaneendra Kanuganti, Geetha's brother
- Mouryani as Sirisha, Govind's sister
- Rahul Ramakrishna as Ramakrishna, Govind's friend
- Vennela Kishore as Kishore, Geetha's former fiancée
- Nagaendra Babu as Ravindra Babu, Govind's father
- Annapoorna as Rajyalakshmi, Geetha's grandmother
- Janaki Sabesh as Janaki, Geetha's mother
- Giri Babu as Rama Chandra Murthy, Geetha's grandfather
- Chandra Mohan as Chandram, Geetha's father
- Aneesha Dama as Neelu, Vijay's student and former one-sided lover
- Kalyani Natarajan as Neelu's mother and Geetha's MD
- Abhay Bethiganti as Govind's friend
- Ravi Prakash as Ravi, a Police officer and Phaneendra's friend
- Chitram Srinu as Taxi driver
- Gautam Raju as Police officer
- Duvvasi Mohan as Priest
- Nithya Menon in a special appearance as Nithya
- Anu Emmanuel in a special appearance as Girl in Bus Stop
- Prabhas Sreenu in a cameo appearance in the song "What the Life"
- Anisha Alla in a special appearance

== Music ==
The soundtrack of the film was composed by Gopi Sundar with lyrics written by Ananta Sriram, Sri Mani and Sagar. Vijay Deverakonda, made his singing debut through this film, performing the song "What the Life". The album was preceded by the single "Inkem Inkem Inkem Kaavaale" on 7 June 2018, followed by the album on 21 June 2018 at a launch event held at JRC Convention Centre, Film Nagar, Hyderabad. The music was positively received by critics.

=== List of Songs ===
No.	Title	Lyrics	Singer(s)	Length
1.	"Inkem Inkem Inkem Kaavaale"	Ananta Sriram	Sid Sriram	4:26
2.	"Vachindamma"	Sri Mani	Sid Sriram	3:56
3.	"Yenti Yenti"	Sri Mani	Chinmayi Sripada	2:23
4.	"Tanemandhe Tanemandhe"	Ananta Sriram	Anurag Kulkarni	1:10
5.	"Kanureppala Kaalam"	Sagar	Gopi Sundar	2:48
6.	"What the Life"	Sri Mani	Vijay Deverakonda, L. V. Revanth	3:22

== Release ==
Upon the announcement of the film's title, the makers announced that the film will be scheduled to release on August. Later on mid-May 2018, the makers confirmed the release date as 15 August 2018. The film was premiered in the United States, on 14 August, a day before the actual release. Geetha Govindam fetched ₹15 crore (US$1.6 million), from its theatrical rights.

== Reception ==
=== Box office ===
Geetha Govindham is a Telugu-language film budget of ₹5 crore. Box office collection of ₹132 crore and Box office verdict was an All Time Blockbuster.

=== Critical reception ===
On the review aggregator website Rotten Tomatoes, 100% of 6 critics' reviews are positive, with an average rating of 6/10.

Sangeetha Devi Dundoo of The Hindu wrote "Parasuram avoids the melodramatic tropes. Gopi Sundar's music works beautifully for the narrative, with Sid Sriram's Inkem Inkem Inkem Kaavale growing into a new earworm. The welcome humour through Vennela Kishore, Rahul Ramakrishna and Abhay Betiganti also adds a touch of smartness". The Times of India gave 3 1/2 out of 5 stars stating "Geetha Govindam has some good humour, fine music and a wonderful lead pair". The Indian Express gave 3 out of 5 stars stating "What's refreshing about writer-director Parasuram's approach to this romantic-comedy is the way he has handled the leading man".

Hindustan Times gave 3 1/2 out of 5 stars stating "Geetha Govindam is not about universe conspiring to bring you close to your loved ones, it is about how coincidences can come to bite your behind". Idlebrain.com gave 3 1/4 out of 5 stars stating "Geetha Govindam has predictability attached to it. What works for the film are characterizations and performances by lead characters. Writer and director Parasuram writes an engaging screenplay and interesting characterizations. Some of the scenes appear routine, but he makes it up with screenplay". Great Andhra gave 3 1/4 out of 5 stars stating "Geetha Govindam is quite old, oft-seen. When the plot is not new, screenplay and actors should do the magic. That is what director Parasuram does with the film".

Firstpost gave 3 out of 5 stars stating "Geetha Govindam, despite its flaws, is a film that gets most things right associated with its genre. It's also a welcome departure for Deverakonda from Arjun Reddy, and proof of the fact that he's no 'one hit wonder' and still has it in him to deliver".

India Today gave 3 out of 5 stars stating "Geetha Govindam does not have an exceptional story that will make you say 'wow' from the word go. It's the same boy-meets-girl-and-how-they-fall-in-love-with-each-other story. But director Parasuram makes Geetha Govindam interesting with his clever writing". IndiaGlitz gave 3 1/4 out of 5 stars stating "Geetha Govindam tells an atypical story using a regular format. And it works. Parusuram enlivens the proceedings by infusing comedy at almost every step. Vijay Deverakonda and Rashmika elevate the film with their splendid performances".

== Awards and nominations ==
Date of ceremony	Award	Category	Recipient(s) and nominee(s)	Result	Ref.
6 January 2019	Zee Cine Awards Telugu	Sensational Hit of the Year	GA2 Pictures	Won	
6 January 2019	Zee Cine Awards Telugu	Favorite Actor	Vijay Deverakonda	Won	
6 January 2019	Zee Cine Awards Telugu	Favorite Actress	Rashmika Mandanna	Won	
6 January 2019	Zee Cine Awards Telugu	Favorite Album of the Year	Gopi Sundar	Won	
15 & 16 August 2019	South Indian International Movie Awards	Best Film (Telugu)	GA2 Pictures	Nominated	
15 & 16 August 2019	South Indian International Movie Awards	Best Director (Telugu)	Parasuram	Nominated	
15 & 16 August 2019	South Indian International Movie Awards	Best Actor (Telugu)	Vijay Deverakonda	Nominated	
15 & 16 August 2019	South Indian International Movie Awards	Best Actress (Telugu)	Rashmika Mandanna	Nominated	
15 & 16 August 2019	South Indian International Movie Awards	Best Music Director (Telugu)	Gopi Sundar	Nominated	
15 & 16 August 2019	South Indian International Movie Awards	Best Lyricist (Telugu)	Ananta Sriram	Nominated	
15 & 16 August 2019	South Indian International Movie Awards	Best Male Playback Singer (Telugu)	Sid Sriram	Nominated	
15 & 16 August 2019	South Indian International Movie Awards	Best Female Playback Singer (Telugu)	Chinmayi	Nominated	
15 & 16 August 2019	South Indian International Movie Awards	Critics' choice Best Actor – Telugu	Vijay Deverakonda	Won	
21 December 2019	Filmfare Awards South	Best Film – Telugu	GA2 Pictures	Nominated	
21 December 2019	Filmfare Awards South	Best Director – Telugu	Parasuram	Nominated	
21 December 2019	Filmfare Awards South	Best Actor – Telugu	Vijay Deverakonda	Nominated	
21 December 2019	Filmfare Awards South	Best Actress – Telugu	Rashmika Mandanna	Nominated	
21 December 2019	Filmfare Awards South	Critics Best Actress – Telugu	Rashmika Mandanna	Won	
21 December 2019	Filmfare Awards South	Best Supporting Actor – Telugu	Rahul Ramakrishna	Nominated	
21 December 2019	Filmfare Awards South	Best Music Director – Telugu	Gopi Sundar	Nominated	
21 December 2019	Filmfare Awards South	Best Lyricist – Telugu	Ananta Sriram	Nominated	
21 December 2019	Filmfare Awards South	Best Male Playback Singer – Telugu	Sid Sriram	Won	
21 December 2019	Filmfare Awards South	Best Female Playback Singer – Telugu	Chinmayi	Nominated	
