= Pushpa 2: The Rule (soundtrack) =

2024 soundtrack album by Devi Sri Prasad

- Soundtrack album cover

Soundtrack album by Devi Sri Prasad
- Released: 5 December 2024
- Recorded: 2023–2024
- Genre: Feature film soundtrack
- Length: 20:19
- Language: Telugu
- Label: T-Series
- Producer: Devi Sri Prasad

Devi Sri Prasad chronology
Kanguva (2024)	Pushpa 2: The Rule (2024)	Thandel (2025)
External audio
- Official Audio Jukebox on YouTube

Singles from Pushpa 2: The Rule
- 1. "Pushpa Pushpa" Released: 1 May 2024; 2. "Sooseki" Released: 29 May 2024; 3. "Kissik" Released: 24 November 2024; 4. "Peelings" Released: 1 December 2024; 5. "Gango Renuka Thalli" Released: 5 December 2024

Pushpa 2: The Rule is the soundtrack album composed by Devi Sri Prasad to the 2024 Indian Telugu-language action drama film of the same name, directed by Sukumar, starring Allu Arjun, Rashmika Mandanna and Fahadh Faasil. The lyrics are written by Chandrabose.

== Production ==
The music sitting and discussions were started in Prague, Czech Republic in August 2022. By September 2022, three songs were finalised. By March 2023, two more songs were finalised including an item number. Initially, there were speculations about various actresses including Triptii Dimri, Janhvi Kapoor, Disha Patani and Shraddha Kapoor, being considered for the item song. However, these speculations turned out to be false as Sreeleela was later finalised for the item song.

Vijay Polaki and Shrashti Verma had choreographed the dance moves in the first song, "Pushpa Pushpa". "Sooseki: The Couple Song" was sung by Shreya Ghoshal and choreographed by Ganesh Acharya. The special song, "Kissik" featuring Sreeleela and choreographed by Ganesh Acharya, was filmed in November 2024 in Hyderabad. Earlier Jani Master was roped in by the makers to choreograph the song, but was eventually removed due to sexual assault allegations. A romantic song (Peelings) featuring Allu Arjun and Rashmika and choreographed by Sekhar was filmed in Hyderabad. The song, "Peelings", featured Malayalam lyrics written by Siju Thuravoor and those lyrics were sung by Aparna Harikumar, Indu Sanath and Gayathry Rajeev. These lines in Malayalam was featured in all six languages. The "Gango Renuka Thalli" song was based on the folk festival called Gangamma Jatara. The song featured the vocals of Devi Sri Prasad, S.P. Abhishek, Shenbagaraj, Saisharan, Narayanan Ravishankar, Sarath Santosh, Shridhar Ramesh, Govind Prasad, Renjith Unni, Aparna Harikumar, Abinaya Shenbagaraj, Sushmita Narasimhan, Pavithra Chari and Sherley Joy. It was also reported that the makers spent ₹50–60 crore on the song along with the fight sequence.

The film also featured additional background score given by Sam C. S.

== Release ==
The music rights of the film were acquired by T-Series for ₹65 crore. On 1 May 2024, the first single titled "Pushpa Pushpa" was released in all the six languages. The song became the fastest to reach 50 million views. The hook step from the first single became viral on the internet and social media. The second single titled "Sooseki" (in Telugu), "Angaaron" (in Hindi), "Soodaana" (in Tamil), "Kandaalo" (in Malayalam), "Nodoka" (in Kannada), and "Aaguner" (in Bengali) was released on 29 May 2024. The third single titled "Kissik" was released on 24 November 2024 at the pre-release event in Chennai. The song eventually became the most viewed South Indian song in 24 hours with 25 million views. The fourth single titled "Peelings" which was choreographed by Sekhar was released on 1 December 2024. The fifth song titled "Gango Renuka Thalli" (in Telugu), "Kaali Mahaa Kaali" (in Hindi), "Ganga Gangamma Thaaye" (in Tamil), "Kaali Karaali Devi" (in Malayalam), "Gange Renuka Thaaye" (in Kannada), and "Maa Je Re Shey Maa Kaali" (in Bengali) was released on 5 December 2024 along with the album. The song "Dammunte Pattukora" was released on 24 December 2024. However, after few hours the song was removed from YouTube amid the stampede case and also due to its controversial lyrics. Later, the song was re-released on YouTube on 28 December 2024.

== Track listing ==
All tracks are written by Chandrabose.

Telugu
No.	Title	Singer(s)	Length
1.	"Pushpa Pushpa"	Nakash Aziz, Deepak Blue	4:16
2.	"Peelings"	Shankarr Babu Kandukoori, Laxmi Dasa	4:07
3.	"Gango Renuka Thalli"	V. M. Mahalingam	3:28
4.	"Sooseki"	Shreya Ghoshal	4:20
5.	"Kissik"	Sublahshini	4:08
Total length:			20:19

Extended Soundtrack
No.	Title	Lyrics	Singer(s)	Length
1.	"Dammunte Pattukora"	Sukumar	Allu Arjun	1:33

All tracks are written by Raqueeb Alam.

Hindi
No.	Title	Singer(s)	Length
1.	"Pushpa Pushpa"	Nakash Aziz, Mika Singh	4:16
2.	"Peelings"	Javed Ali, Madhubanti Bagchi	4:07
3.	"Kaali Mahaa Kaali"	Kailash Kher	3:28
4.	"Angaaron" (The Couple Song)	Shreya Ghoshal	4:20
5.	"Kissik"	Lothika, Sublahshini	4:08
Total length:			20:19

Extended Soundtrack
No.	Title	Lyrics	Singer(s)	Length
1.	"Dum Hai To Rok Ke Bata"	Rajender Sapre	Shreyas Talpade	1:33

All tracks are written by Viveka.

Tamil
No.	Title	Singer(s)	Length
1.	"Pushpa Pushpa"	Nakash Aziz, Deepak Blue	4:16
2.	"Peelings"	Senthil Ganesh, Rajalakshmi	4:07
3.	"Ganga Gangamma Thaaye"	V. M. Mahalingam	3:28
4.	"Soodaana"	Shreya Ghoshal	4:20
5.	"Kissik"	Sublahshini	4:08
Total length:			20:19

All tracks are written by Siju Thuravoor.

Malayalam
No.	Title	Singer(s)	Length
1.	"Pushpa Pushpa"	Ranjith Govind	4:16
2.	"Peelings"	Pranavam Sasi, Sithara Krishnakumar	4:07
3.	"Kaali Karaali Devi"	Sannidhanandan	3:28
4.	"Kandaalo"	Shreya Ghoshal	4:20
5.	"Kissik"	Priya Jerson	4:08
Total length:			20:19

All tracks are written by Varadaraj Chikkaballapura.

Kannada
No.	Title	Singer(s)	Length
1.	"Pushpa Pushpa"	Vijay Prakash	4:16
2.	"Peelings"	Santhosh Venky, Amala Chebolu	4:07
3.	"Gange Renuka Thaaye"	Santhosh Venky	3:28
4.	"Nodoka"	Shreya Ghoshal	4:20
5.	"Kissik"	Sublahshini	4:08
Total length:			20:19

All tracks are written by Srijato Bandopadhyay.

Bengali
No.	Title	Singer(s)	Length
1.	"Pushpa Pushpa"	Timir Biswas	4:16
2.	"Peelings"	Timir Biswas, Arpita Chakraborty	4:07
3.	"Maa Je Re Shey Maa Kaali"	Timir Biswas	3:28
4.	"Aaguner"	Shreya Ghoshal	4:20
5.	"Kissik"	Ujjaini Mukherjee	4:08
Total length:			20:19

== Background score ==
Pushpa 2: The Rule

Film score by Devi Sri Prasad
- Released: 21 January 2025
- Recorded: 2023–24
- Genre: Film score
- Length: 33:27
- Language: Telugu
- Label: T-Series
- Producer: Devi Sri Prasad

Devi Sri Prasad chronology
Kanguva (2024)	Pushpa 2: The Rule (2025)	Thandel (2025)

Pushpa 2: The Rule (OST)
No.	Title	Length
1.	"Pushpa's Entry Theme"	4:33
2.	"Pushpa's Power Theme"	2:48
3.	"Pushpa's Tandav"	4:13
4.	"Shekhawat Theme"	3:51
5.	"Pushpa vs Shekhawat"	8:28
6.	"Emotional Theme"	2:00
7.	"Final Battle"	7:34
Total length:		33:27

Pushpa 2: The Rule

Film score by Sam C. S.
- Released: 25 January 2025
- Recorded: 2024
- Genre: Film score
- Length: 16:03
- Language: Telugu
- Label: T-Series
- Producer: Sam C. S.

Sam C. S. chronology
Pani (2024)	Pushpa 2: The Rule (2025)	Ennu Swantham Punyalan (2025)

Pushpa 2: The Rule (OST)
No.	Title	Length
1.	"The Rise Of Masses – Police Station Entry"	0:46
2.	"Pushpa's Rule"	0:53
3.	"The World Of Shekhawat"	0:55
4.	"Japanese Port – Intro"	0:35
5.	"The Decision Is Made – CM"	1:12
6.	"Entry To The Battlefield"	0:47
7.	"Srivalli's Fierce"	1:22
8.	"The Anger Of Dakshayani"	1:43
9.	"Jathara – The Judgement"	0:35
10.	"Police – Rule Of Pushpa"	0:47
11.	"Face Of Humiliation"	0:36
12.	"Across The Border"	1:04
13.	"Deal Done"	1:18
14.	"Forest Arrest"	0:26
15.	"Race In The Waters"	0:54
16.	"The Pregnancy"	0:46
17.	"Pushpa 3 – The Rampage"	0:39
18.	"Wildfire"	0:43
Total length:		16:03

== Controversy ==
On 24 November 2024, at the pre-release event in Chennai, composer Devi Sri Prasad blamed the producers for repeated complaints against him that he failed to deliver the background score and songs on time. He said that the producers have more complaints than love for him. Later at the event, producer Ravi Shankar denied the rift and mentioned that there are no issues, and that they are like a family. There were also reports that Thaman S, B. Ajaneesh Loknath and Sam C. S. were hired to compose the background score due to delays in delivering the score on time by Prasad. This controversy also came into light when Mythri Movie Makers, who are also the producers of Good Bad Ugly (2025), replaced Prasad with G. V. Prakash Kumar. However, during the Hyderabad event Prasad ended the ongoing controversy with producers and thanked them wholeheartedly and highlighted the special bond between them. Later, Sam C. S. confirmed his involvement in the film's background score.
