= Monica (2025 song) =

2025 Indian song by Sublahshini, Anirudh Ravichander and Asal Kolaar

- Official single cover

Single by Sublahshini, Anirudh Ravichander, and Asal Kolaar

from the album Coolie
- Language: Tamil
- Released: 11 July 2025
- Recorded: 2024–2025
- Studio: Albuquerque Records, Chennai; Mix Magic, Chennai
- Genre: EDM; Kuthu; Rap
- Length: 3:37
- Label: Sun Pictures, Sun TV (publisher)
- Composer: Anirudh Ravichander
- Lyricist: Vishnu Edavan
- Producer: Anirudh Ravichander

Music video
- "Monica" on YouTube

"Monica" is a 2025 song composed by Anirudh Ravichander for the soundtrack album of the Indian Tamil-language film Coolie, directed by Lokesh Kanagaraj and produced by Sun Pictures. The song was sung by Sublahshini and Anirudh, with rap verses written and performed by Asal Kolaar, and lyrics for the track written by Vishnu Edavan. The song is a retro dance-pop track set against a vibrant harbor backdrop.

The song was released as the second single on 11 July 2025 through the production house. The song's lyrical version was released on the YouTube through Sun TV on the same day. The full video song was released on 11 September 2025. The song was also released in Telugu with lyrics by Krishna Kanth, in Hindi and Kannada with lyrics by Kumaar, and in Malayalam with lyrics by Deepak Ram. Upon its release, the song received widespread positive response and began trending online. Its hook-step dance performed by Pooja Hegde became a viral trend, contributing significantly to the film's popularity. Hegde's dance steps were widely appreciated, with Firstpost calling her the "Queen of the Hook Step".

Following its release, it peaked on several charts including UK Asian Music Chart and had a significant commercial success, even gained global attention. With global attention, star power, and a pulsating beat, "Monica" continues to cement its place as one of Tamil cinema's most talked-about tracks of the year, according to News Today.

== Background ==
Anirudh Ravichander composed the song. This marked his second collaboration with Pooja Hegde, after Beast (2022) and fourth with Lokesh Kanagaraj, after Master (2021), Vikram (2022) and Leo (2023). Vishnu Edavan, an assistant director of Lokesh had written lyrics for the song, after previously doing so for Master, Vikram and Leo. Rap verses were written and performed by Asal Kolaar in his second collaboration with Anirudh and Lokesh, following their work on the song "Naa Ready". "Monica" is the third song featuring Hegde in a track composed by Anirudh, following "Arabic Kuthu" and "Jolly O Gymkhana".

Sublahshini was chosen to record the song. When Anirudh's team first contacted her, she thought it was a prank call. After speaking with her friend, who was collaborating with Anirudh, she realized it was genuine and agreed to sing the song. She recorded the song in Telugu, Tamil, Hindi, Kannada and Malayalam versions, along with Anirudh himself at Albuquerque Records, Chennai.

In an interview with The Hollywood Reporter India, Lokesh revealed that both he and Anirudh are huge fans of the Italian actress Monica Bellucci. Initially, they decided to create a song inspired by her, which led to the track being named "Monica". Once the music took shape, the duo started thinking about who could visually carry that same energy on screen. That was when Lokesh thought of Hegde, she had the grace and glam they were looking for. After she came on board, it felt natural to name her character Monica as a tribute to their original inspiration.

== Composition and lyrics ==
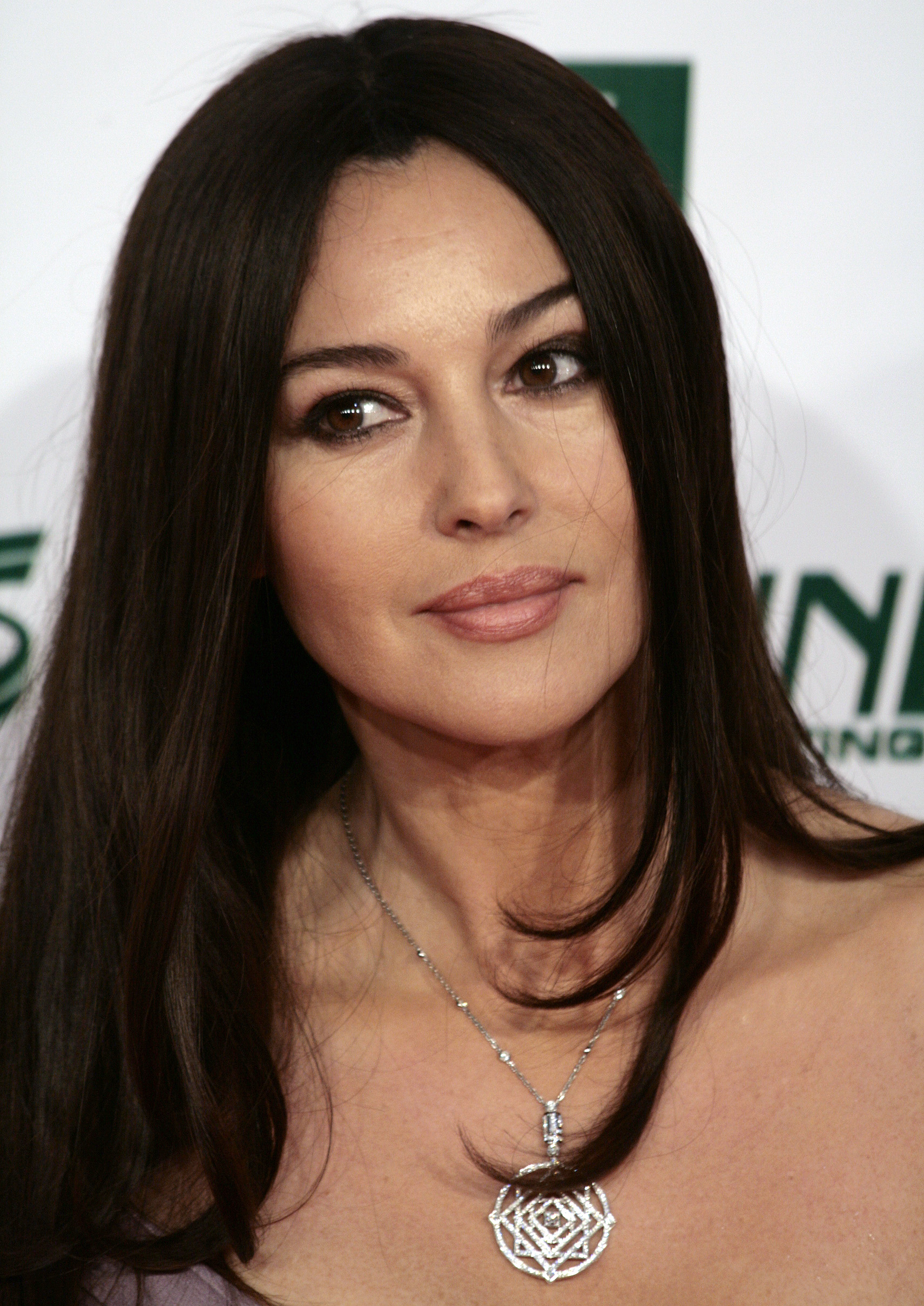
The song pays homage to Italian actress Monica Bellucci.

"Monica" is a high-energy dance-pop track infused with retro elements, characterized by Anirudh Ravichander's signature upbeat rhythms and vibrant instrumentation. Unlike other songs, Anirudh provided hook lines and tunes so that Vishnu Edavan could get the concept and write the lyrics. The lyrics, penned by Vishnu Edavan, pays homage to Monica Bellucci. The Telugu version was written by Krishna Kanth, the Hindi and Kannada versions by Kumaar, and the Malayalam version by Deepak Ram. The song include subtle references to Rajinikanth's iconic persona, with lines like "Laka Laka Laka" from Chandramukhi (2005). Edavan also included the word "Pooja" in the lyrics. The chorus features the catchy hook, "Monica, My Dear Monica, Love You Monica, Baby Ma Monica," designed for mass appeal. Key lyrical phrases include "Pattunu paathale pulse ethum body" (translating to "Just seeing her makes the pulse race") and "Jilebi lady" (comparing the woman to a sweet, colorful jalebi), incorporating humor and Tamil colloquialisms.

== Music video ==
=== Background and production ===
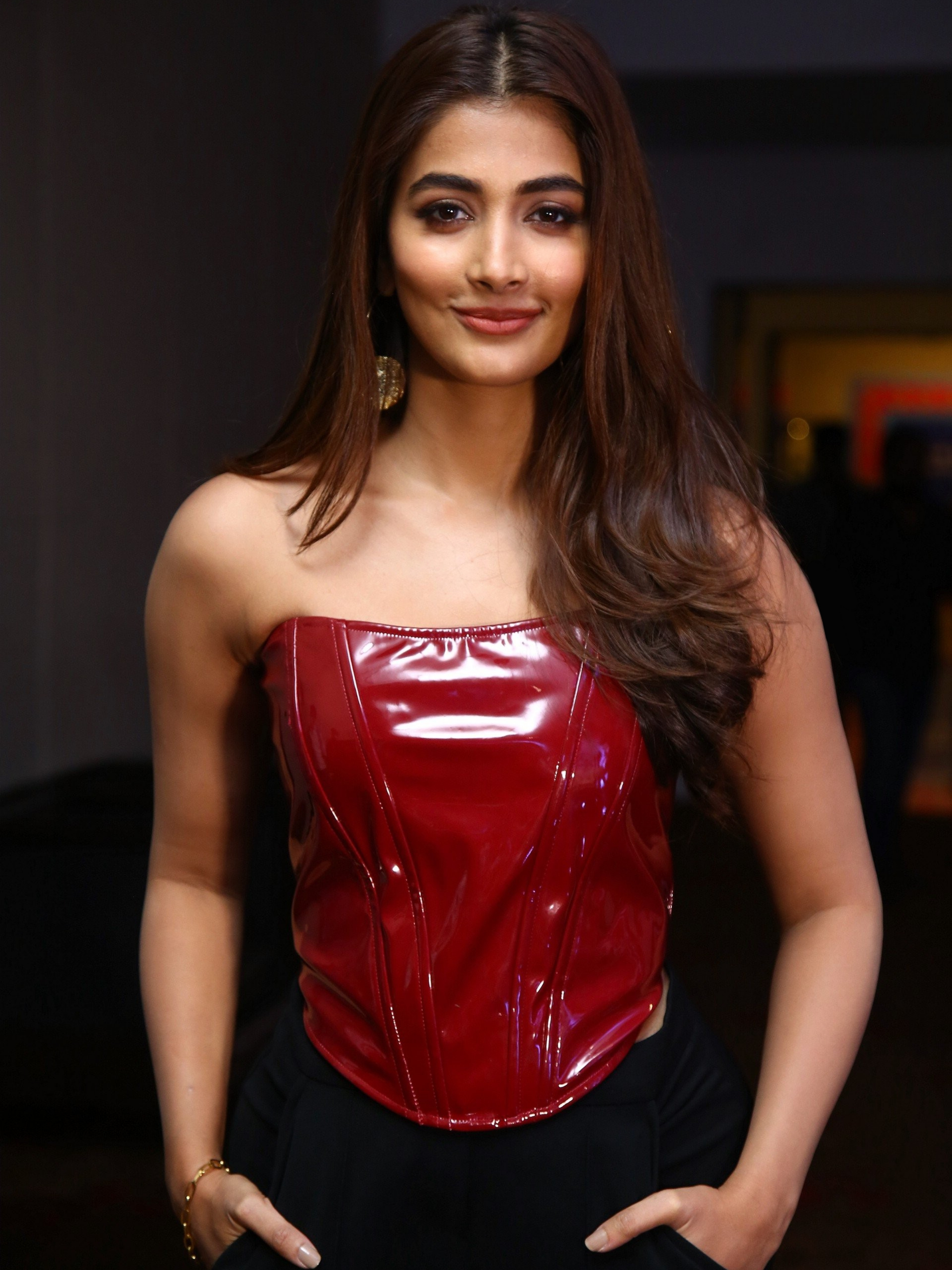
Pooja Hegde appeared as Monica.

In mid-February 2025, it was reported that Hegde would join in Coolie for a special appearance. Hegde had a call with Lokesh to discuss his vision for the music video. After hearing the song and loving it, Hegde agreed to proceed. Lokesh expressed a preference for a red gown, but Hegde and the designer deliberated over the specific shade of red, given the many variations available. They ultimately chose a vibrant red that Hegde wanted to ensure it stood out in the crowd. Together, they finalized the gown's color and silhouette to achieve the desired look. Hegde's red gown was designed by Versace. On 26 February, Sun Pictures revealed a promotional image for Coolie with her face hidden and the caption "Revealing tomorrow". Hegde's inclusion was confirmed by the makers on 27 February with a poster through their social media handles. She was paid ₹4 crore (US$420,000) for the song shoot.

As part of the film's production, the scenes involved in the music video of the song were shot at Ennore Port, Chennai in late-February 2025. Music video featuring Hegde was choreographed by Sandy. Girish Gangadharan handled the cinematography and Praveen Raja designed the costumes. Video song also featured Soubin Shahir and Rishikanth. As Fahadh Faasil couldn't play the role of Soubin, he wasn't featured in the song. Making video was released by the filmmakers on 16 July 2025.

The production of "Monica" was one of the most physically challenging sequences for Hegde, who faced extreme heat, high humidity, and dust during the shoot at Port. The environment caused physical discomfort, including sunburns and blisters, with visible tan lines lasting for months. The sequence required high-energy choreography, marking Hegde's first major dance performance after recovering from a ligament tear, requiring significant physical exertion and resilience. Filming on Maha Shivaratri (26 February 2025) was particularly challenging, as Hegde was fasting, yet she continued to perform. Despite these challenges, the production team prioritized delivering a polished and glamorous aesthetic, ensuring the performance appeared effortless on screen. The supporting dancers played a crucial role in sustaining the energy of the sequence, providing unwavering support throughout the rigorous filming process.

== Marketing and release ==
On 9 July 2025, the second single announcement of the film is coming at 6 PM. The second single, titled "Monica" starring Hegde was announced by the makers with a promo. Release date of the song was also released on the same day. Hegde shared the promo video on X, captioning it: "Monika Fever Begins!" Instantly it became trending and received wider recognition with fans calling it "red storm". On 10 July, the makers unveiled a poster featuring Hegde stating "Make way for Monica’s entry!" On 11 July morning, makers unveiled a short promo on their social media handles captioning "Monica bellucci, Erangi vandhachi".

The second single, titled "Monica" was released on 11 July 2025. It was released as lyrical video on Sun TV's YouTube channel. The Telugu lyrical video was released on the same day on Gemini TV YouTube channel, marking the first time a Sun Pictures and Lokesh film's Telugu lyrical video has been released simultaneously with the Tamil version. Hindi version's lyrical video was released on 12 July on Sun Neo and Sun Bangla YouTube channels. The Kannada and Malayalam versions of the song were released on 14 August 2025. The full video song was released on 11 September 2025.

== Reception ==
Zainab Khanam from News 24 wrote, "Pooja looks stunning as Monica in a red shimmery outfit with a high slit. Her dance, along with Soubin Shahir's moves and Anirudh Ravichander's catchy music, makes the song a perfect party number." Anindita Mukherjee from News18 wrote, "Pooja Hegde as Monica looks lovely in her red sparkly gown with a high slit. Her movement, combined with Soubin Shahir's rare dance skills to Anirudh Ravichander's sounds, makes it the ideal party song." A critic from Zoom TV stated, "Dressed in a red shimmery outfit with a high slit, Pooja Hegde looks breathtaking as Monica. Her dance, combined with Soubin Shahir's unique dance moves to Anirudh Ravichander's beats, makes it the ideal party anthem."

Praising Hegde's performance Mathrubhumi stated, "Clad in a shimmering red outfit with a daring high slit, Pooja Hegde looks every bit the glamorous star in 'Monica'. Her commanding screen presence, coupled with sharply executed dance moves, adds to the grand scale of the song. The video, which takes place aboard a giant cargo ship, features Pooja leading the choreography with confidence and charisma." A critic from Mid-Day noted, "Pooja Hegde is seen capturing eyeballs with her sizzling dance moves in a red dress." A critic of Bollywood Hungama wrote, "Featuring the ever-gorgeous Pooja Hegde in a dazzling red ensemble, the dance number is a high-energy, visually vibrant treat that promises to be one of the film's biggest highlights." A Firstpost critic stated, "Pooja Hegde has created a storm yet again with her fiery moves in the recently released song Monica from the upcoming film Coolie." A critic from Moneycontrol wrote, "From thigh-high boots to sparkling outfits, Pooja's style in the song radiates diva energy. Each shot showcases her daring fashion choices, perfectly complementing the passionate tone of the music."

Suhas Sistu from The Hans India wrote, "Music director Anirudh Ravichander delivers another potential chartbuster, mixing foot-tapping beats with lively vocals by Subhalakshmi and himself. Rapper Asal Kolaar infuses a burst of freshness with his fiery verse, giving the track a modern twist." A critic from The Times of India stated, "The song crooned by Suhashini and Anirudh, has a vibrant, foot-tapping vibe and has been made on a grand scale." The Indian Express described it as an "energetic number". Sounak Mukhopadhyay from Mint wrote, "Composed by Anirudh Ravichander, the song blends Tamil cinema's bold style with glamour."

=== Monica Bellucci's response ===
In an interview with Anupama Chopra for The Hollywood Reporter India, Hegde learned that Melita Toscan du Plantier, director of the Marrakech International Film Festival, shared the "Monica" song video with Bellucci. Chopra revealed that Bellucci enjoyed the song and loved it, which is named in her honor. Bellucci also praised Hegde for her dance performance in the song. Hegde responded, "That's the biggest compliment", expressing her gratitude for Bellucci's positive feedback. Hegde said, "I believe a lot of people were commenting on her Instagram, and a lot of Tamil fans were saying, 'Please go watch Coolie's Monica song'." Bellucci's positive reception of the song was a welcome surprise for Hegde. "So it was a big feat. I'm glad she liked it," Hegde remarked.

== Commercial performance ==
Upon the release, song received widespread acclaim from the audience. The lyrical video shortly received over 100 million views on YouTube. The song topped YouTube's trending charts for several days. The song peaked on the several charts including UK Asian Music Chart and had a significant commercial success. Telugu version of the song was also highly successful.

== Cultural impact ==
Hegde's rolling step in the music video went viral and became a signature hook step. "Monica" has emerged as a cultural phenomenon, driven by its viral spread on social media platforms like Instagram and YouTube. There were many short videos created on social media, performing to the music and recreating dance sequences. The song's catchy hook and vibrant choreography inspired thousands of fan-made reels, with over 5000 Instagram Reels reported within a day of its release, surpassing "Kaavaalaa" from Jailer.

Upon its release, the song started trending on internet and became a chartbuster. The song received positive reception from audiences, praising the music, vocal and choreography. The song soon started trending on several music platforms. It was noted that while the first song, "Chikitu", primarily appealed to fans, the second song, "Monica", captivated a broader audience and achieved greater reach than the song "Kaavaalaa". Namasthe Telangana noted, "Pooja Hegde's acting, dance, screen presence and the beats of the song have made this song a mass song. The song is gaining popularity not only among the youth but also among the family audience." The song increased the expectations of the audience and anticipation for the film Coolie. Bollywood Hungama wrote "Known for her strong screen presence, Pooja brings a lively energy to the number, making it one of the early talking points ahead of the film's release." Telugu version was also success impressing mass audience.

Hegde's energetic glamorous dance sequence in a red gown, were widely praised by the viewers. Soubin drew attention for his energetic dance performance, which was described as unexpected by audiences. A dialogue associated with him, "I don’t know simple step", originally from his role as Shivan Sir in Premam (2015), became a focal point in online discussions of his performance.

Sathyaraj danced to the song at the film's pre-release event held in Hyderabad. Saniya Iyappan and Ineya performed the hook step at the Miss Kerala 2025 in Ireland. While promoting the film Sahasam (2025), Ramzan Muhammed and Gouri G. Kishan performed to the song at Maharaja's College, Kochi. Anna Rajan performed to the song at an event in Kerala. Many celebrities such as Swasika, Reba Monica John, Gayathri Suresh, Arya, Sruthi Lakshmi, Kalidas Jayaram, Malavika Menon, Sakshi Agarwal, Sherif, Bhavana Balakrishnan, Samyuktha Shanmuganathan, Ashwini Aanandita, Suma Kanakala, Ramya Subramanian, Brigida Saga, Vindhuja Vikraman, Kanmani Manoharan, Aswath Chandrasekhar, Umair Lateef, Ashwin Kkumar, Ramya Ranganathan, Sonal Devraj, Kambam Meena, Vriddhi Vishal, Diya Deepan, Hamsa, Rubeena and Rubiseena, Ameya Mathew, Saniya Babu, Rajath Kishan, Dhanaraj CM, Akhila Prakash, Niveditha Gowda and several others, recreated the music video by performing the song's iconic hook step.

== Live performances ==
Sublahshini and Anirudh performed the song at a promotional event for the film held at Quake Arena, Hyderabad in July 2025. Sublahshini, Anirudh and Asal Kolaar performed the song at the film's audio launch event held on 2 August 2025 at Jawaharlal Nehru Stadium, Chennai. On 23 August 2025, Sublahshini , Anirudh and Asal Kolaar performed the song at Hukum World Tour in Chennai, where Asal performance the extended rap version of the song. On 30 August, Jonita Gandhi and Anirudh performed the song at Anirudh's Powerhouse Tour concert at Rudolf Weber-Arena in Germany.

== Credits and personnel ==
Credits adapted from YouTube.

- Anirudh Ravichander – composer, vocals, arranger, programmer
- Vishnu Edavan – lyrics
- Sublahshini – vocals
- Asal Kolaar – rap
- Sandy – choreography
- Kalyan – rhythm producer
- Karthik Vamsi – rhythm producer
- Shashank Vijay – additional rhythm programmer
- Nivin Raphael – additional music programmer
- D. Balasubramani – muga veenai
- Ananthakrrishnan – music advisor
- Shivakiran S – session assistant, engineer
- Rajesh Kannan – engineer
- Vinay Sridhar – mix engineer
- Srinivasan M – mix engineer
- Rupendar Venkatesh – mastering engineer
- Velavan B – music coordinator

== Charts ==
Chart performances for "Monica"
Chart (2025)	Peak position
UK Asian Music Chart (OCC)	6
India (Mirchi Top 20)	1
