= Coolie (soundtrack) =

2025 soundtrack album by Anirudh Ravichander

- Soundtrack album cover

Soundtrack album by Anirudh Ravichander
- Released: 2 August 2025
- Recorded: July 2024 – March 2025
- Studios: Albuquerque Records, Chennai; AM Studios, Chennai; Studio DMI, Las Vegas
- Genre: Feature film soundtrack
- Length: 25:58
- Languages: Tamil; English
- Label: Sun Pictures
- Producer: Anirudh Ravichander

Anirudh Ravichander chronology
| Kingdom (2025) | Coolie (2025) | Madharaasi (2025) |
External audio
- Coolie — Official Audio Jukebox on YouTube

Singles from Coolie
- 1. "Chikitu" Released: 25 June 2025; 2. "Monica" Released: 11 July 2025; 3. "Powerhouse" Released: 22 July 2025

Coolie is the soundtrack album composed by Anirudh Ravichander for the 2025 film of the same name. The film is directed by Lokesh Kanagaraj, produced by Kalanithi Maran under Sun Pictures and stars Rajinikanth.

The album featured eight tracks, with three of them being previously released as singles. It was self-released through Sun Pictures on 2 August 2025, coinciding with the film's audio launch event at the Nehru Stadium in Chennai.

== Production ==
The soundtrack is composed by Anirudh Ravichander, in his fourth collaboration with Lokesh after Master (2021), Vikram (2022) and Leo (2023); fifth with Rajinikanth after Petta (2019), Darbar (2020), Jailer (2023) and Vettaiyan (2024). Lokesh revealed that the lyrics for the songs were written by his assistant director Vishnu Edavan. The audio rights were acquired by Sun Pictures's own company.

== Release ==
"Coolie Disco" was the track featured on the teaser trailer that released on 22 April 2024. It features a sample of "Vaa Vaa Pakkam Vaa", written by Muthulingam and composed by Ilaiyaraaja for Thanga Magan (1983), also starring Rajinikanth.

The first single "Chikitu" (based on a viral video of T. Rajendar), teased on Rajinikanth's 74th birthday (12 December 2024) as "Chikitu Vibe", was released on 25 June 2025. The second single, titled "Monica", was released on 11 July 2025.

Teased as "Powerhouse Vibe" on the occasion of 100 days before the film's release, the third single, "Powerhouse", was released on 22 July 2025 at a special launch event in Hyderabad.

The audio launch was held on 2 August 2025 at Jawaharlal Nehru Indoor Stadium in Chennai.

== Track listing ==
=== Tamil ===
| No. | Title | Lyrics | Singer(s) | Length |
|---|---|---|---|---|
| 1. | "Coolie Disco" | Muthulingam | Anirudh Ravichander | 2:09 |
| 2. | "Chikitu" | Arivu | T. Rajendar, Arivu, Anirudh Ravichander | 3:36 |
| 3. | "Uyirnaadi Nanbane" | Vishnu Edavan | Sai Smriti, Anirudh Ravichander | 3:49 |
| 4. | "I Am The Danger" | Heisenberg | Siddharth Basrur, Anirudh Ravichander | 3:34 |
| 5. | "Monica" | Vishnu Edavan, Asal Kolaar | Sublahshini, Anirudh Ravichander, Asal Kolaar | 3:37 |
| 6. | "Kokki" | Amogh Balaji | Sooraj Santhosh, Amogh Balaji | 3:52 |
| 7. | "Powerhouse" | Arivu | Anirudh Ravichander, Arivu | 3:26 |
| 8. | "Mobsta" | Heisenberg, Arivu | Anirudh Ravichander | 1:54 |
| Total length: | | | | 25:58 |

=== Telugu ===
| No. | Title | Lyrics | Singer(s) | Length |
|---|---|---|---|---|
| 1. | "Coolie Disco" | Muthulingam | Anirudh Ravichander | 2:09 |
| 2. | "Chikitu" | Srinivasa Mouli | T. Rajendar, Arivu, Anirudh Ravichander | 3:36 |
| 3. | "Oopirive" | Krishna Kanth | Sai Smriti, Anirudh Ravichander | 3:49 |
| 4. | "I Am The Danger" | Heisenberg | Siddharth Basrur, Anirudh Ravichander | 3:34 |
| 5. | "Monica" | Krishna Kanth | Sublahshini, Anirudh Ravichander | 3:08 |
| 6. | "Kokki" | Amogh Balaji | Sooraj Santhosh, Amogh Balaji | 3:52 |
| 7. | "Powerhouse" | Rambabu Gosala | Arivu, Chorus | 3:26 |
| 8. | "Mobsta" | Heisenberg, Arivu | Anirudh Ravichander, Pavan Charan, Siddharth Shandilyasa, Saatvik G Rao, Ritesh G Rao | 1:56 |
| Total length: | | | | 25:23 |

=== Hindi ===
| No. | Title | Lyrics | Singer(s) | Length |
|---|---|---|---|---|
| 1. | "Coolie Disco" | Muthulingam | Anirudh Ravichander | 2:09 |
| 2. | "Chikitu" | Kumaar | T. Rajendar, Arivu, Anirudh Ravichander | 3:36 |
| 3. | "Milna Ye Aakhri Hai Kya" | Raqueeb Alam | Sai Smriti, Anirudh Ravichander | 3:49 |
| 4. | "I Am The Danger" | Heisenberg | Siddharth Basrur | 3:34 |
| 5. | "Monica" | Kumaar | Sublahshini, Anirudh Ravichander | 3:08 |
| 6. | "Kokki" | Amogh Balaji | Sooraj Santhosh, Amogh Balaji | 3:52 |
| 7. | "Powerhouse" | Kumaar | Arivu, Chorus | 3:26 |
| 8. | "Mobsta" | Heisenberg, Arivu | Anirudh Ravichander, Pavan Charan, Siddharth Shandilyasa, Saatvik G Rao, Ritesh G Rao | 1:56 |
| Total length: | | | | 25:23 |

=== Malayalam ===
| No. | Title | Lyrics | Singer(s) | Length |
|---|---|---|---|---|
| 1. | "Coolie Disco" | Muthulingam | Anirudh Ravichander | 2:09 |
| 2. | "Chikitu" | Deepak Ram | Anirudh Ravichander, T. Rajendar, Arivu, Arjun Vijay | 3:36 |
| 3. | "Uyirakum Bandhame" | Deepak Ram | Priya Mali, Anirudh Ravichander | 3:49 |
| 4. | "I Am The Danger" | Heisenberg | Siddharth Basrur, Anirudh Ravichander | 3:34 |
| 5. | "Monica" | Deepak Ram | Sublahshini, Anirudh Ravichander | 3:08 |
| 6. | "Kokki" | Amogh Balaji | Sooraj Santhosh, Amogh Balaji | 3:52 |
| 7. | "Powerhouse" | Deepak Ram | Dinker Kalvala, Anirudh Ravichander | 3:26 |
| 8. | "Mobsta" | Deepak Ram, Heisenberg | Anirudh Ravichander | 1:56 |
| Total length: | | | | 25:58 |

=== Kannada ===
| No. | Title | Lyrics | Singer(s) | Length |
|---|---|---|---|---|
| 1. | "Coolie Disco" | Muthulingam | Anirudh Ravichander | 2:09 |
| 2. | "Chikitu" | Nagarjun Sharma | Anirudh Ravichander, T. Rajendar, Dinker Kalvala, Arivu | 3:36 |
| 3. | "Dhooraagbeda" | Nagarjun Sharma | Priya Mali, Anirudh Ravichander | 3:49 |
| 4. | "I Am The Danger" | Heisenberg | Siddharth Basrur, Anirudh Ravichander | 3:34 |
| 5. | "Monica" | Nagarjun Sharma | Sublahshini, Anirudh Ravichander | 3:08 |
| 6. | "Kokki" | Amogh Balaji | Sooraj Santhosh, Amogh Balaji | 3:52 |
| 7. | "Powerhouse" | Nagarjun Sharma | Dinker Kalvala, Anirudh Ravichander | 3:26 |
| 8. | "Mobsta" | Nagarjun Sharma, Heisenberg | Anirudh Ravichander | 1:56 |
| Total length: | | | | 25:58 |

== Background score ==
Coolie

Film score by Anirudh Ravichander
- Released: 10 September 2025
- Recorded: 2024–25
- Studios: Albuquerque Records, Chennai; Knack Studios, Chennai; Play Head Studio, Mumbai; Neo Sound, Mumbai; Studio DMI, Las Vegas
- Genre: Film score
- Length: 41:08
- Languages: Tamil, English, Spanish
- Label: Sun Pictures
- Producer: Anirudh Ravichander
External audio
- Coolie – Original Background Score on YouTube

The film further featured twenty one songs in the background score, that was released as a separate album on 10 September 2025.

| No. | Title | Length |
|---|---|---|
| 1. | "Harbour Gang" | 1:47 |
| 2. | "Dayal Theme" | 1:38 |
| 3. | "Mansion Rules" | 0:46 |
| 4. | "Deva Entry" | 0:44 |
| 5. | "Rajasekar's Lab" | 1:31 |
| 6. | "Simon x Dayal Theme" | 1:12 |
| 7. | "Invention" | 1:50 |
| 8. | "The Chair" | 2:53 |
| 9. | "Coolie Feels" | 2:10 |
| 10. | "Photograph" | 0:39 |
| 11. | "Kingpin Simon Theme" | 1:18 |
| 12. | "Monica Transition" | 0:36 |
| 13. | "Back From The Dead" | 0:58 |
| 14. | "Powerhouse Code" | 1:58 |
| 15. | "Coolie DISCO^{[a]}" | 2:09 |
| 16. | "Kalyani The Mastermind" | 0:57 |
| 17. | "Kaleesha" | 3:42 |
| 18. | "Deva's 3 Minute Monologue" | 3:12 |
| 19. | "Dahaa Theme" | 2:59 |
| 20. | "Untold Story" | 3:46 |
| 21. | "Powerhouse x Disco" | 1:25 |
| 22. | "Bus Fight x Powerhouse x Disco" | 2:58 |
| Total length: | | 41:08 |

Notes

- ^{^a} Track 15 from the original soundtrack, was released within the soundtrack album.

== Reception ==
The singles, "Chikitu", "Monica", and "Powerhouse", met with favourable response from critics and audiences. After the song "Monica" was released, the hook step, performed by Pooja Hegde in the music video, quickly went viral and became a social media sensation, increasing the film's anticipation. Many people recreated the dance step by recording their own dance performances to the song and sharing these videos across social media platforms.

== Legal issues ==
A week after the teaser's release, Ilaiyaraaja sent a notice to the makers for using "Vaa Vaa Pakkam Vaa" in the teaser without his permission. Pointed as an offence under the Copyright Act of 1976, the composer demanded the makers to get proper permission or remove the track from the teaser. Rajinikanth, when questioned about the issue, stated that it was only between Ilaiyaraaja and the film's producer, Kalanithi Maran. However, according to critic Sathish Kumar, Ilaiyaraaja does not hold the copyright to the song as Echo, the record label of the song, had their entire catalogue acquired by Sony Music South who later sold this song's rights to Sun Pictures. During a hearing in the Madras High Court in late April, the judge stated Ilaiyaraaja could not claim exclusive ownership over the song, as the lyrics were written by a different person.

== Album credits ==
Credits adapted from Sun Pictures.

- Original Background Score composed by Anirudh Ravichander
- Strings Performed by Sunshine Orchestra and The Chennai Strings Orchestra
- Scores Orchestrated conducted & supervised by Balasubramanian G, Abishek V
- Recorded by Biju James Protools
- Editor - Abin Ponnachan
- Scores Recorded at Mystic Hues
- Cello Solo - Balaji M
- Score Transcription Assisted by Vignesh
- Dobro Guitar, Bouzouki, Oud, Shamisen, Ruan, Mandolin - Tapas Roy
- Acoustic Guitar, Electric Guitar - Keba Jeremiah
- Bass Guitar - Sajith Satya
- Solo Violin - Ananthakrrishnan
- Whistle - Satish Ragunathan
- Solo Cello - Balaji
- Woodwinds - Kamalakar, Navin Iyer
- Backing Vocals - Arjun Chandy, Deepthi Suresh, Sushmita Narasimhan, Arpita Gandhi
- Piano, Keyboard, Synth, Rhythm & Orchestral Programmed by Anirudh Ravichander
- Additional Music Programmed by Jishnu Vijayan, IC, Arish, Nivin Rapheal, Dan Kristen, Advait Mahesh, Ashwin Krishna, Raja Ravivarma
- Cinematic Hybrid Percussions & Additional Rhythm Programmed by Shashank Vijay
- Music Advisor - Ananthakrrishnan
- Creative Consultant - Sajith Satya
- Executive Supervision - Srinivasan M
- Session Assistant - Shivakiran S
- Music Editor - Harish Ram L H
- Original Score Mixed for Dolby Atmos by Vinay Sridhar
