= Peelings =

2024 song by Devi Sri Prasad, Chandrabose, Shankarr Babu Kandukoori and Laxmi Dasa

- Official song cover

Single by Devi Sri Prasad and Chandrabose featuring Shankarr Babu Kandukoori and Laxmi Dasa

from the album Pushpa 2: The Rule
- Language: Telugu
- Released: 1 December 2024
- Recorded: 2023–2024
- Genre: Dance; pop; EDM
- Length: 4:07
- Label: T-Series
- Composer: Devi Sri Prasad
- Lyricist: Chandrabose
- Producer: Devi Sri Prasad

Pushpa 2: The Rule track listing
- 1. "Pushpa Pushpa"; 2. "Sooseki"; 3. "Kissik"; 4. "Peelings"; 5. "Gango Renuka Thalli"

Music video
- "Peelings" on YouTube

"Peelings" is an Indian Telugu-language song, composed by Devi Sri Prasad, with lyrics written by Chandrabose, and recorded by Shankarr Babu Kandukoori and Laxmi Dasa for the soundtrack album of the 2024 Indian film Pushpa 2: The Rule. It was released on 1 December 2024 (released on YouTube as a lyrical video song) as the fourth single from the album, through T-Series. The full video song, featuring visuals directly from the film, was released on 16 December 2024 on YouTube.

The song was also released in other languages through the same name. Upon the release, the song was subjected to criticism owing to its lyrics and dance choreography, but after the film's release, it peaked at number one on the Billboard India Songs in the third week and had a significant commercial success.

== Background and composition ==
Devi Sri Prasad has chosen folk singers Shankarr Babu Kandukoori and Laxmi Dasa to record the song. Speaking to Telangana Today, Laxmi Dasa told, "I am overjoyed by the overwhelming response to the song from various sections of the society". The song begins with Malayalam lyrics interlude, written by Siju Thuravoor. It is sung by Aparna Harikumar, Indu Sanath and Gayathry Rajiv in all six languages.

The Hindi version has lyrics written by Raqueeb Alam, and sung by Javed Ali, Madhubanti Bagchi. The Tamil version has lyrics written by Viveka, and sung by Senthil Ganesh and Rajalakshmi. The Malayalam version has lyrics written by Siju Thuravoor, and sung by Pranavam Sasi and Sithara. The Kannada version has lyrics written by Varadaraj Chikkaballapura, and sung by Santhosh Venky and Amala Chebolu. The Bengali version has lyrics written by Srijato Bandopadhyay, and sung by Timir Biswas and Arpita Chakraborty.

== Music video ==
=== Background and production ===
As part of the film's production, the scenes involved in the music video of the song were shot at a specially constructed set from 23 November 2024 to 26 November 2024. Sekhar has choreographed the dance sequences. During an interview, Rashmika Mandanna revealed that her phobia to being lifted made her uncomfortable and further stated, "I am someone who has a phobia of being lifted, I wasn’t very comfortable with people lifting me and here is the song where I am only being lifted. I had this thing of ‘how am I going to do this? I recently realised that if I make up my mind, I fully go and surrender to my director and co-actor. I was like, Let’s just do it. If this is what the film needs, let’s do it. Once you trust the man, it becomes fun".

=== Synopsis ===
The music video is a direct clip from the scenes in Pushpa 2: The Rule. The scenes feature Allu Arjun and Rashmika Mandanna dancing together.

== Credits and personnel ==
Credits adapted from YouTube.

- Devi Sri Prasad – Composer
- Chandrabose – Lyricist
- Shankarr Babu Kandukoori – Vocals
- Laxmi Dasa – Vocals
- Siju Thuravoor – Malayalam lyrics
- Sekhar – Choreographer
- Chaitanya Ravi Krishnan – Keyboards
- Vikas Badisa – Keyboards
- Kalyan – rhythm
- A Jayakumar – Clarinet
- S. P. Abhishek – Backing vocals, vocal supervision
- Aparna Harikumar – Malayalam vocals
- Indu Santh – Malayalam vocals
- Gayathry Rajiv – Malayalam vocals
- A. Uday Kumar – Mix engineer, mastering engineer, record engineer
- T. Uday Kumar – record engineer
- Suresh Kumar Taddi – record engineer
- Raam Gandikota – record engineer
- Murugan – orchestra in-charge
- Pugalendhi – studio assistant
- Bharat – studio assistant
- B. Manikandan – Album Co-ordinator

== Charts ==
Weekly chart performance for "Peelings"
Chart (2024–2025)	Peak position
India (Billboard)	1
UK Asian Music Chart (OCC) (Telugu)	13
UK Asian Music Chart (OCC) (Bengali)	21
