= Kanguva (soundtrack) =

- Soundtrack album cover

Soundtrack album by Devi Sri Prasad
- Released: 11 December 2024
- Recorded: 2022–2024
- Genre: Feature film soundtrack
- Language: Tamil
- Label: Saregama
- Producer: Devi Sri Prasad

Devi Sri Prasad chronology
Rathnam (2024)	Kanguva (2024)	Pushpa 2: The Rule (2024)

Singles from Kanguva
- 1. "Fire Song" Released: 23 July 2024; 2. "Yolo" Released: 21 October 2024; 3. "Thalaivane" Released: 29 October 2024; 4. "Mannippu" Released: 7 November 2024

Kanguva is the soundtrack album composed by Devi Sri Prasad for the 2024 Indian Tamil-language of the same name, directed by Siva, starring Suriya in dual roles. The film is produced by K. E. Gnanavel Raja under Studio Green, jointly with UV Creations. The lyrics are written by Viveka and Madhan Karky. The album was released by Saregama on 11 December 2024.

== Production ==
In March 2022, either Anirudh Ravichander or Ravi Basrur was reported to be replacing D. Imman, who was initially announced as the music composer. However, the makers chose Devi Sri Prasad later. The soundtrack and film score is composed by Devi Sri Prasad, in his fifth collaboration with Suriya after Maayavi (2005), Aaru (2005), Singam (2010) and Singam II (2013) and second with Siva after Veeram (2014). The film's music rights were purchased by Saregama.

== Release ==
The track "Kanguva Glimpse" which featured in film's glimpse video was released on 26 July 2023. The first single titled "Fire Song" was released on 23 July 2024, coinciding with Suriya's 49th birthday. The second single "Yolo" was released on 21 October 2024.

The audio launch was planned to be held on 26 October at Nehru Stadium, Chennai. It was initially reported that the audio launch was scheduled on 20 October 2024. The third single "Thalaivane" (in Tamil and Malayalam), "Naayaka" (in Telugu and Kannada), and "Naayak" (in Hindi) was released on 29 October 2024. The fourth single "Mannippu" (in Tamil), "Mannimpu" (in Telugu), "Maappu" (in Malayalam), "Mannisu" (in Kannada) and "Maafi" (in Hindi) was released on 7 November 2024. The album was released by Saregama on 11 December 2024.

== Track listing ==
=== Tamil ===
No.	Title	Lyrics	Singer(s)	Length
1.	"Fire Song"	Viveka	Sid Sriram, B Praak,Senthil Ganesh, Deepthi Suresh	3:27
2.	"Yolo"	Viveka	Devi Sri Prasad, Yazin Nizar, Ranina Reddy & Dr Zeus	3:58
3.	"Thalaivane"	Madhan Karky	Aravind Srinivas, Deepak Blue, Shenbagaraj, Narayanan Ravishankar, Govind Prasad, Shibi Srinivasan, Prasanna Adhisesha, Saisharan, Vikram Pitty, Abhijith Rao, Aparna Harikumar, Sushmita Narasimhan, Pavithra Chari, Lavita Lobo, Deepthi Suresh, Latha Krishna, Padmaja Sreenivasan	3:12
4.	"Mannippu"	Viveka	Raghu Dixit, Nakash Aziz, Ali Azmat Mamta Sharma	5:16
5.	"Kanga Kanguva"	Madhan Karky	Devi Sri Prasad, Arunraja Kamaraj, Vedala Hemachandra, Vishal Dadlani	4:37

=== Telugu ===
No.	Title	Lyrics	Singer(s)	Length
1.	"Fire Song"	Sreemani	Anurag Kulkarni, Deepthi Suresh	3:27
2.	"Yolo"	Rakendu Mouli	Devi Sri Prasad, Sagar, Shraddha Das	3:58
3.	"Naayaka"	Rakendu Mouli	Aravind Srinivas, Deepak Blue, Shenbagaraj, Narayanan Ravishankar, Govind Prasad, Shibi Srinivasan, Prasanna Adhisesha, Saisharan, Vikram Pitty, Abhijith Rao, Aparna Harikumar, Sushmita Narasimhan, Pavithra Chari, Lavita Lobo, Deepthi Suresh, Latha Krishna, Padmaja Sreenivasan	3:12
4.	"Mannimpu"	Kalyan Chakravarthy	Raghu Dixit	5:16
5.	"Kanga Kanguva"	Sahithi, Rakendu Mouli	Hemachandra	4:37

=== Malayalam ===
No.	Title	Lyrics	Singer(s)	Length
1.	"Fire Song"	Mankombu Gopalakrishnan	Rahul Nambiar, Aparna Harikumar	3:27
2.	"Yolo"	Mankombu Gopalakrishnan	Yazin Nizar, Devi Sri Prasad, Alex	3:58
3.	"Thalaivane"	Mankombu Gopalakrishnan	Aravind Srinivas, Deepak Blue, Shenbagaraj, Narayanan Ravishankar, Govind Prasad, Shibi Srinivasan, Prasanna Adhisesha, Saisharan, Vikram Pitty, Abhijith Rao, Aparna Harikumar, Sushmita Narasimhan, Pavithra Chari, Lavita Lobo, Deepthi Suresh, Latha Krishna, Padmaja Sreenivasan	3:12
4.	"Maappu"	Mankombu Gopalakrishnan	Sarath Santosh	5:16
5.	"Kanga Kanguva"	Mankombu Gopalakrishnan	Bharath K Rajesh	4:37

=== Kannada ===
No.	Title	Lyrics	Singer(s)	Length
1.	"Fire Song"	Varadaraj Chikkaballapura	Deepak Blue, Deepthi Suresh	3:27
2.	"Yolo"	Varadaraj Chikkaballapura	Nakul Abhyankar, Devi Sri Prasad, Ranina Reddy	3:58
3.	"Naayaka"	Varadaraj Chikkaballapura	Aravind Srinivas, Deepak Blue, Shenbagaraj, Narayanan Ravishankar, Govind Prasad, Shibi Srinivasan, Prasanna Adhisesha, Saisharan, Vikram Pitty, Abhijith Rao, Aparna Harikumar, Sushmita Narasimhan, Pavithra Chari, Lavita Lobo, Deepthi Suresh, Latha Krishna, Padmaja Sreenivasan	3:12
4.	"Mannisu"	Varadaraj Chikkaballapura	Raghu Dixit	5:16
5.	"Kanga Kanguva"	Varadaraj Chikkaballapura	Santhosh Venky	4:37

=== Hindi ===
No.	Title	Lyrics	Singer(s)	Length
1.	"Fire Song"	Raqueeb Alam	B Praak, Pavithra Chari	3:27
2.	"Yolo"	Mellow D	Devi Sri Prasad, Shilpa Rao	3:58
3.	"Naayak"	Raqueeb Alam	Aravind Srinivas, Deepak Blue, Shenbagaraj, Narayanan Ravishankar, Govind Prasad, Shibi Srinivasan, Prasanna Adhisesha, Saisharan, Vikram Pitty, Abhijith Rao, Aparna Harikumar, Sushmita Narasimhan, Pavithra Chari, Lavita Lobo, Deepthi Suresh, Latha Krishna, Padmaja Sreenivasan	3:12
4.	"Maafi"	Raqueeb Alam	Nakash Aziz	5:16
5.	"Kanga Kanguva"	Vimal Kashyap	Nakash Aziz	4:37
