= Madharaasi (soundtrack) =

2025 soundtrack album by Anirudh Ravichander

Soundtrack album by Anirudh Ravichander
- Released: 27 August 2025
- Recorded: 2024–2025
- Studios: Albuquerque Records, Chennai
- Genre: Feature film soundtrack
- Length: 18:09
- Language: Tamil
- Label: Junglee Music
- Producer: Anirudh Ravichander

Anirudh Ravichander chronology
Coolie (2025)	Madharaasi (2025)	Love Insurance Kompany (2025)

Singles from Madharaasi
- 1. "Salambala" Released: 31 July 2025; 2. "Vazhiyiraen" Released: 23 August 2025

Madharaasi is the soundtrack album composed by Anirudh Ravichander to the 2025 Tamil-language psychological action thriller film of the same name directed by AR Murugadoss and produced by Sri Lakshmi Movies, starring Sivakarthikeyan, Rukmini Vasanth, Vidyut Jammwal, Biju Menon, Vikranth and Shabeer Kallarakkal. The album featured nine songs with lyrics written by Super Subu, Vignesh Shivan, Adesh Krishna, Vishnu Edavan, Vivek and Kwame Fyah. Two singles—"Salambala" and "Vazhiyiraen"—preceded the album on 31 July and 23 August 2025, respectively. The soundtrack was released on the occasion of Ganesh Chaturthi (27 August) under the Junglee Music label.

== Background ==
The soundtrack is composed by Anirudh Ravichander, in his third collaboration with Murugadoss after Kaththi (2014) and Darbar (2020); eighth with Sivakarthikeyan. (Note: Anirudh Ravichander and Sivakarthikeyan previously collaborated for Ethir Neechal (2013), Maan Karate (2014), Kaaki Sattai (2015), Remo (2016), Velaikkaran (2017), Doctor (2021) and Don (2022).) The album featured nine tunes: three themes and six songs, with lyrics written by Super Subu, Vignesh Shivan, Adesh Krishna, Vishnu Edavan, Vivek and Kwame Fyah. The songs were performed by Sai Abhyankkar, Anirudh, Ravi G, Shilpa Rao and Fyah.

== Release ==
The film's music rights were acquired by Junglee Music. The first single, "Salambala", was released on 31 July 2025. The second video single "Vazhiyiraen" was released on 23 August 2025.

The audio launch event was held on 24 August 2025 at Sai Leo Muthu Indoor Stadium at Sri Sai Ram Engineering College in Chennai, with the cast and crew in attendance. However, the film's soundtrack was released on streaming platforms three days later, on the occasion of Ganesh Chaturthi. The album was further released in Telugu, Kannada, Malayalam and Hindi languages.

== Track listing ==
Tamil
No.	Title	Lyrics	Singer(s)	Length
1.	"Salambala"	Super Subu	Sai Abhyankkar	3:27
2.	"Vazhiyiraen"	Vignesh Shivan	Anirudh Ravichander	3:55
3.	"Madharaasi Theme"	—	—	1:13
4.	"Unadhu Enadhu"	Adesh Krishna	Anirudh Ravichander, Ravi G, Shilpa Rao	4:20
5.	"Animal Instinct" (Title Glimpse Theme)	—	—	0:37
6.	"Usara Uruvi"	Vishnu Edavan	Anirudh Ravichander, Ravi G	3:24
7.	"Madharaasi Flow"	Kwame Fyah	Anirudh Ravichander, Kwame Fyah	0:40
8.	"Thangapoovey"	Vivek	Anirudh Ravichander, Ravi G	3:56
9.	"Mudinja Thodra" (Trailer Theme)	—	—	1:58
Total length:				18:09

Telugu
No.	Title	Lyrics	Singer(s)	Length
1.	"Selavika"	Srinivasa Mouli	Dhanunjay Seepana	3:27
2.	"Varadhalle"	Ramajogayya Sastry	Adithya RK	3:55
3.	"Madharaasi Theme"	—	—	1:13
4.	"Happy Street"	Ramajogayya Sastry	Ravi G, Priya Mali	4:20
5.	"Animal Instinct" (Title Glimpse Theme)	—	—	0:37
6.	"Maare Kaalam"	Ramajogayya Sastry	Deepu	3:24
7.	"Madharaasi Flow"	Kwame Fyah	Anirudh Ravichander, Kwame Fyah	0:40
8.	"Ningi Thaaraa"	Ramajogayya Sastry	Ravi G	3:56
9.	"Trailer Theme"	—	—	1:58
Total length:				18:09

Hindi
No.	Title	Lyrics	Singer(s)	Length
1.	"Tadapaa"	Ritesh G Rao	Dhanunjay Seepana	3:27
2.	"Kaise Karu"	Ritesh G Rao	Adithya RK	3:55
3.	"Madharaasi Theme"	—	—	1:13
4.	"Happy Street"	Ritesh G Rao	Ravi G, Priya Mali	4:20
5.	"Animal Instinct" (Title Glimpse Theme)	—	—	0:37
6.	"Teri Judaai"	Ritesh G Rao	Deepu	3:24
7.	"Madharaasi Flow"	Kwame Fyah	Anirudh Ravichander, Kwame Fyah	0:40
8.	"Naina Tere"	Ritesh G Rao	Ritesh G Rao	3:56
9.	"Trailer Theme"	—	—	1:58
Total length:				18:09

Kannada
No.	Title	Lyrics	Singer(s)	Length
1.	"Sari Illa Sari Illa"	Nagarjun Sharma	Dhanunjay Seepana	3:27
2.	"Thara Thara"	Nagarjun Sharma	Adithya RK	3:55
3.	"Madharaasi Theme"	—	—	1:13
4.	"Happy Street"	Nagarjun Sharma	Ravi G, Priya Mali	4:20
5.	"Animal Instinct" (Title Glimpse Theme)	—	—	0:37
6.	"Matthe Baa"	Nagarjun Sharma	Deepu	3:24
7.	"Madharaasi Flow"	Kwame Fyah	Anirudh Ravichander, Kwame Fyah	0:40
8.	"Malle Hoove"	Nagarjun Sharma	Ravi G	3:56
9.	"Trailer Theme"	—	—	1:58
Total length:				18:09

Malayalam
No.	Title	Lyrics	Singer(s)	Length
1.	"Kudukkilu Kudukkalle"	Deepak Ram	Dhanunjay Seepana	3:27
2.	"Ullake Odippoyi"	Deepak Ram	Adithya RK	3:55
3.	"Madharaasi Theme"	—	—	1:13
4.	"Happy Street"	Deepak Ram	Ravi G, Priya Mali	4:20
5.	"Animal Instinct" (Title Glimpse Theme)	—	—	0:37
6.	"Uyironnuruki"	Deepak Ram	Deepu	3:24
7.	"Madharaasi Flow"	Kwame Fyah	Anirudh Ravichander, Kwame Fyah	0:40
8.	"Thangapoove"	Deepak Ram	Jishnu Vijayan	3:56
9.	"Trailer Theme"	—	—	1:58
Total length:				18:09

== Background Score ==
Madharaasi

Film score by Anirudh Ravichander
- Released: 28 November 2025
- Studios: Albuquerque Records, Chennai; Knack Studios, Chennai; Play Head Audio, Mumbai; El Studios, San Francisco; Neo Sound Mumbai Studio DMI, Las Vegas
- Genre: Film score
- Length: 23:14
- Language: Tamil
- Label: Junglee Music
- Producer: Anirudh Ravichander
External audio
- Madharaasi – Original Background Score on YouTube

The album consists of 19 songs in the background score album which was released on 28 November 2025.

No.	Title	Length
1.	"Action Mode"	0:51
2.	"Chirag"	0:44
3.	"Fight For Her"	0:54
4.	"Fighting Demons"	2:15
5.	"Gun Culture"	2:19
6.	"Hospital Fun"	0:42
7.	"Interval Fight"	1:38
8.	"Love Blossoms"	0:44
9.	"Orphan"	0:56
10.	"Pre-Interval"	1:10
11.	"Premnath"	0:41
12.	"Raghu and Malathy"	2:39
13.	"Raghu"	0:42
14.	"Raghu's Instinct"	1:03
15.	"Raghu's Rise"	1:02
16.	"She Completes Me"	1:04
17.	"She's Like My Mom"	1:04
18.	"Virat Returns"	2:27
19.	"Virat Theme"	0:44
Total length:		23:14

== Reception ==
Arjun Menon of The Indian Express wrote "Anirudh Ravichandaran is the saving grace, who single-handedly elevates the stakes and vibes in this one with his eclectic score." Niranjan S of DT Next wrote "The film is further lifted with Anirudh’s now-trademark background score, which complements the narrative." A reviewer based at Deccan Chronicle wrote "Anirudh Ravichander, expected to elevate the film with catchy tunes and a pulsating background score, surprisingly falls short." M. Suganth of The Times of India wrote "Anirudh, who usually delivers in energetic fashion, surprisingly, contributes with just a functional score and not-so-catchy songs." Balakrishna Ganeshan of The News Minute wrote "Anirudh, often a saving grace in weaker projects, fails to elevate this one. The songs feel misplaced and disrupt the flow, while the background score lacks punch."

== Personnel ==
Credits adapted from Junglee Music:

- Composer, producer, arranger and programmer: Anirudh Ravichander
- Additional programming: Kalyan, Ganesan Sekar, Nivin Raphael, Arish, Ravi G, Raja Ravivarma, Dan Kristen, Karthik Vamsi, Jishnu Vijayan
- Additional music production: Ganesan Sekar, Narendar Sankar
- Music advisor: Ananthakrrishnan
- Creative consultant: Sajith Satya
- Music coordinator: B Velavan

Instruments

- Backing vocals: Deepthi Suresh
- Acoustic and electric guitar: Keba Jeremiah
- Bass guitar: Naveen Napier, Keba Jeremiah
- Shehnai: S. Ballesh
- Trumpets and trombones: Rakesh MS
- Esraj: Arshad Khan
- Mandolin: Vishwas Hari
- Harmonies: Jishnu Vijayan

Studios

- Albuquerque Records: Srinivasan M, Shivakiran S, Vinay Sridhar, Rajesh Kannan (recording and mixing)
- Vibe N Studios: Lokesh Vijayakumar (recording)
- Mix Magic: Rupendar Venkatesh (mixing and mastering)
- Studio LMI: Luca Pretolesi, Alistair Pintus (mastering)
