= Kissik =

2024 song by Devi Sri Prasad, Chandrabose, Sublahshini featuring Sreeleela

- Official song cover

Single by Devi Sri Prasad and Chandrabose featuring Sublahshini

from the album Pushpa 2: The Rule
- Language: Telugu
- Released: 24 November 2024
- Recorded: 2023–2024
- Genre: Dance; Pop-folk; EDM; Folktronica
- Length: 4:08
- Label: T-Series
- Composer: Devi Sri Prasad
- Lyricist: Chandrabose
- Producer: Devi Sri Prasad

Pushpa 2: The Rule track listing
- 1. "Pushpa Pushpa"; 2. "Sooseki"; 3. "Kissik"; 4. "Peelings"; 5. "Gango Renuka Thalli"

Music video
- "Kissik" on YouTube

"Kissik" is an Indian Telugu-language song, composed by Devi Sri Prasad, with lyrics written by Chandrabose, and recorded by Sublahshini for the soundtrack album of the 2024 Indian film Pushpa 2: The Rule, featuring with Sreeleela and Allu Arjun. It was released on 24 November 2024 (released on YouTube as a lyrical video song) as the third single from the album, through T-Series. The full video song, featuring visuals directly from the film, was released on 19 December 2024 on YouTube.

The song was also released in other languages through the same name. Upon the release, it was compared to "Oo Antava Oo Oo Antava" from Pushpa: The Rise (2021), and was subjected to criticism owing to its lyrics and dance choreography. Sreeleela's dance was also criticized while comparing with her performance in "Kurchi Madathapetti" from Guntur Kaaram (2024). In contrast, following the film's release, it peaked at number one on the Billboard India Songs in the third week and had significant commercial success.

== Background and composition ==
Owing to the success of "Oo Antava Oo Oo Antava" from Pushpa: The Rise (2021), the production team insisted Devi Sri Prasad to include a similar item number in the sequel. By March 2023, the song was finalised. Tamil singer Sublahshini was chosen to record the song.

Sublashini had recorded the song in Telugu, Tamil, and Kannada versions. Lothika had recorded the song in Hindi along with Sublashini. Ujjaini Mukherjee was hired to sing the Bengali version of the song. Priya Jerson recorded the Malayalam version of the song.

== Music video ==
=== Background and production ===
There were speculations about various actresses including Triptii Dimri, Janhvi Kapoor, Disha Patani and Shraddha Kapoor, being considered for the item song. However, these speculations turned out to be false as Sreeleela was later finalised for the song. Jani Master was hired to choreograph the song, but was eventually replaced by Ganesh Acharya, due to sexual assault allegations. The latter had also choreographed the song "Oo Antava Oo Oo Antava". The song was filmed in November 2024 in Hyderabad.

=== Synopsis ===
The music video is a direct clip from the scenes in Pushpa 2: The Rule. The scenes primarily featured Sreeleela and Allu Arjun dancing together. It also featured Rashmika Mandanna, Rao Ramesh and others.

== Release ==
The song was launched at a promotional event in Chennai on 24 November 2024. The full video song was later released on YouTube on 19 December 2024.

== Credits and personnel ==
Credits adapted from YouTube.

- Devi Sri Prasad – Composer
- Chandrabose – Lyricist
- Sublahshini – Vocals
- Ganesh Acharya – Choreographer
- Manasi DSP – Backing vocals
- S. P. Abhishek – Backing vocals, vocal supervision
- A. Uday Kumar – Mix engineer, mastering engineer, record engineer
- T. Uday Kumar – record engineer
- Suresh Kumar Taddi – record engineer
- Murugan – orchestra in-charge
- Pugalendhi – studio assistant
- Bharat – studio assistant
- B. Manikandan – Album Co-ordinator

== Charts ==
Weekly chart performance for "Peelings"
Chart (2024–2025)	Peak position
India (Billboard)	1
UK Asian Music Chart (OCC)	4
