= Sreeleela =

American actress (born 2001)

- Sreeleela in 2026
- Born: June 14, 2001 (age 25); Detroit, United States
- Education: D. Y. Patil School of Medicine, Navi Mumbai
- Occupation: Actress
- Years active: 2017–present
- Children: 2 (adopted)

Sreeleela (Note: Sreeleela is her official name; she does not have a last name. Her name is also sometimes spelled Sree Leela.) (born June 14, 2001) is an American actress of Indian origin who primarily works in Telugu, Kannada and Tamil films. She began her career as a child artist, before making her lead debut in the 2019 Kannada film Kiss. Sreeleela then found commercial success with Bharaate (2019), Dhamaka (2022), and Bhagavanth Kesari (2023), which was followed by a series of poorly received films. She is a recipient of several awards including three SIIMA Awards.

== Early life and education ==
Sreeleela was born in Detroit, United States, into a Telugu family. She was brought up in Bangalore, Karnataka. Her maternal grandparents are from Ongole, Andhra Pradesh, which she frequently visited during her childhood.

Sreeleela's mother, Swarnalatha, is a gynaecologist based in Bangalore. She was married to industrialist Surapaneni Subhakara Rao, but the couple separated before Sreeleela's birth. Rao has publicly denied being Sreeleela's father, while Swarnalatha has not publicly disclosed the identity of her daughter's father.

Sreeleela studied at Bishop Cotton Girls' School, Bangalore. She received training in Bharatanatyam during her childhood. In 2026, she completed her MBBS at the D. Y. Patil School of Medicine in Navi Mumbai.

== Career ==
=== Early work (2017–2020) ===
Sreeleela made her acting debut in the 2017 Telugu film Chitrangada, portraying the younger version of Sindhu Tolani's character. Director A. P. Arjun came across Sreeleela's pictures, taken by cinematographer Bhuvan Gowda, on social media and cast her in a lead role in his 2019 film, Kiss. The actress has stated that she chose to start her career in Kannada-language films as she grew up in Bengaluru, despite having contacts in Telugu cinema.

Filming for Kiss began in 2017, while Sreeleela was in the first year of her pre-university course. The film was released in 2019 and proved successful at the box office. A. Sharadhaa of The New Indian Express stated that Sreeleela made a confident debut, writing, "Sreeleela looks stylish and garners equal attention." Times of India critic Vinay Lokesh echoed the sentiment by stating that Sreeleela shined in her role. A month later, her second film, Bharaate, opposite Sriimurali, was released. Reviewing her performance for The News Minute, Aravind Shwetha wrote: "Sree is good and holds her own along with Sri Murali when it comes to acting and screen presence." Sharadhaa of The New Indian Express wrote that, "This is Sreeleela's second film, and she seems to be getting comfortable with being in front of the camera, and delivers what the role demands."

=== Career fluctuations (2021–present) ===
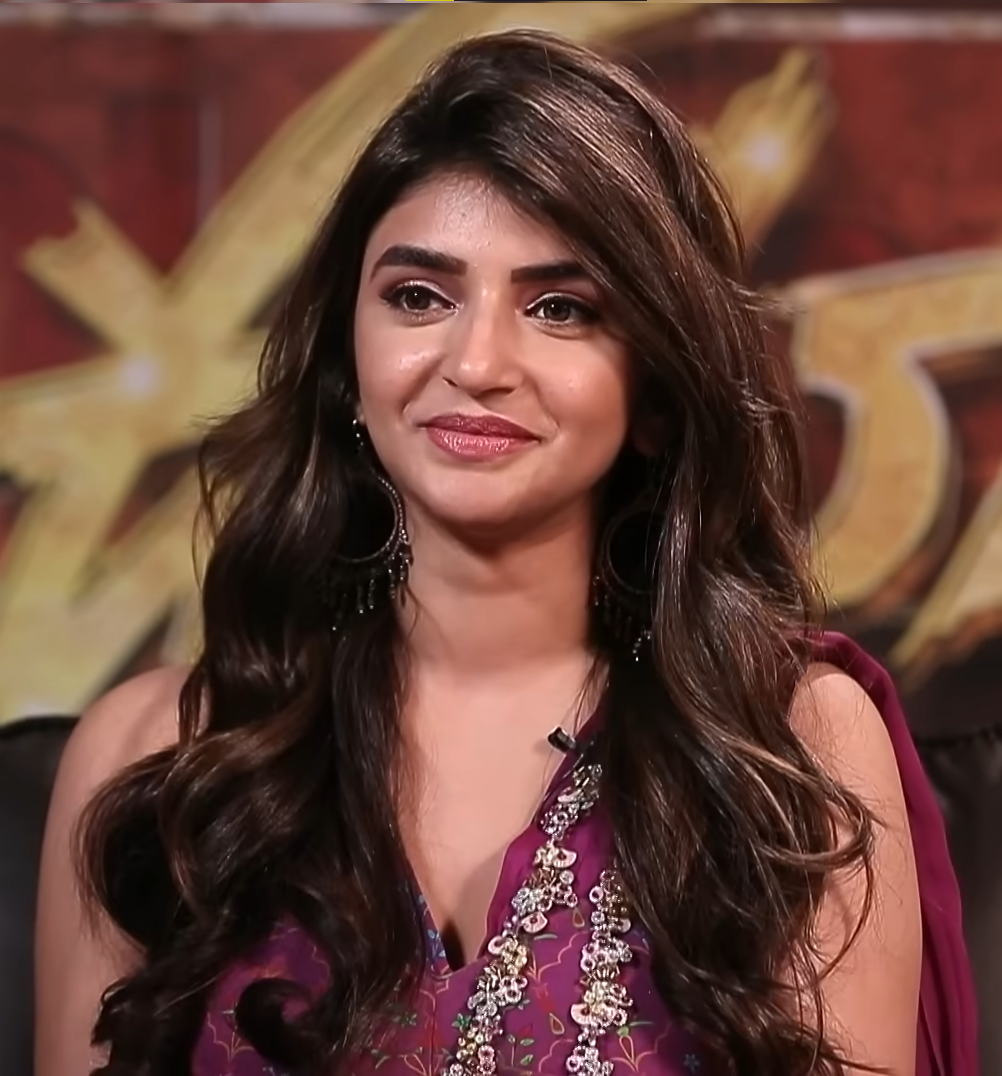
Sreeleela in 2022

In 2021, Sreeleela was cast in the romantic musical film Pelli SandaD, marking her debut in Telugu cinema. The actress described her character as a "role to die for". While the film received negative reviews, Sreeleela's role garnered appreciation from critics. Sangeetha Devi of The Hindu called the film a "costly showreel" of the lead pair, Roshan and Sreeleela, opining that they looked fresh and effervescent but lacked chemistry.

In 2022, she starred in the Kannada romantic comedy By Two Love. Sharadhaa of The New Indian Express felt it was "a delight to watch" her in the film. A review from Deccan Herald opined that while she was impressive, Sreeleela's Kannada pronunciation had room for improvement. She later made a special appearance in the song "Trademark" from the 2022 film James. Following the success of Pelli SandaD, Sreeleela received multiple offers in Telugu films. She next starred in Dhamaka, beside Ravi Teja. The film was a box office success.

In 2023, Sreeleela starred in Skanda, alongside Ram Pothineni. The film received mixed-to-negative reviews from critics and was a commercial failure. Sreeleela then appeared in Bhagavanth Kesari, alongside Nandamuri Balakrishna and Kajal Aggarwal, directed by Anil Ravipudi. The film received mixed-to-positive reviews from critics, though it was a box office success, becoming one of the top-grossing Telugu films of 2023. Sreeleela was nominated for a Filmfare Award for Best Supporting Actress – Telugu for her performance. She then appeared in the film Aadikeshava, opposite Panja Vaisshnav Tej and directed by Srikanth N Reddy, which too was a critical and commercial failure. She also starred in Extra Ordinary Man, opposite Nithin, which came out on December 8, 2023. The film received mixed-to-negative reviews from critics and was a box-office bomb.

In 2024, Sreeleela played the lead opposite Mahesh Babu in Guntur Kaaram. Neeshita Nyayapati of Hindustan Times wrote, "While Sreeleela dances like a dream, her character could've had some bearing on the story in the least." The film was also a box-office flop, but her performance in the song "Kurchi Madathapetti" was praised. Following this, she appeared in the special dance number "Kissik", alongside Allu Arjun, in Pushpa 2: The Rule.

In her first film of 2025, Sreeleela reunited with Nithiin as the lead in Robinhood. The film was a critical and commercial failure. Srivathsan Nadadhur of The Hindu stated that her character was reduced to "a fashion parade". She then played a college student in the bilingual (Telugu/Kannada) Junior. BVS Prakash of Deccan Chronicle stated, "The romantic subplot with Sreeleela feels forced and lacks any emotional weight, though she impresses briefly with her dance."

== Personal life ==
In February 2022, Sreeleela adopted two disabled children. In 2025, she adopted a third child. In an interview, Sreeleela explained that the she does not live with them but that she takes care of their expenses within the orphanage where they reside.

== Media image ==
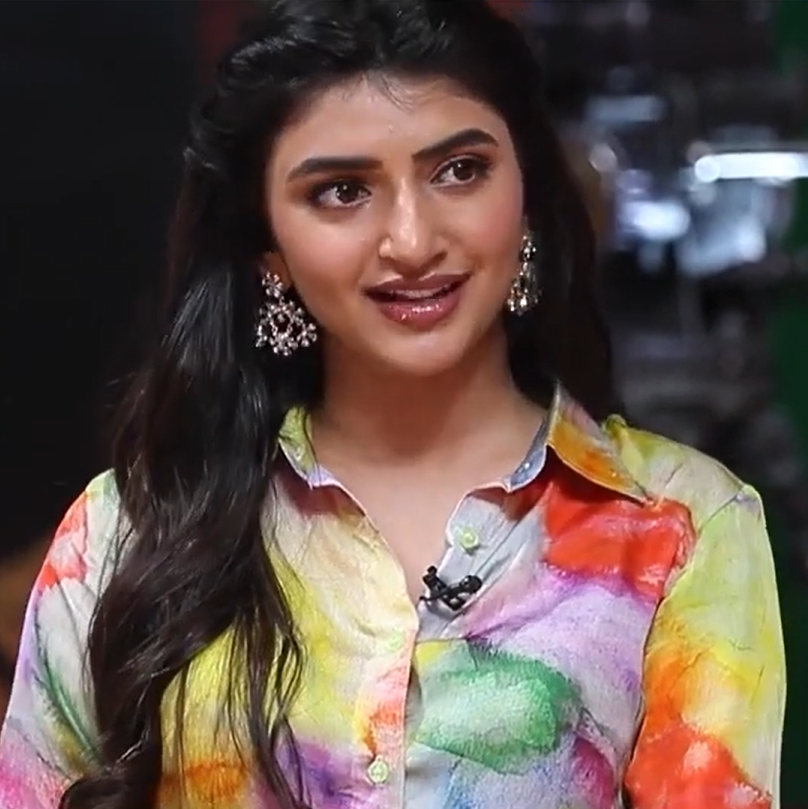
Sreeleela in 2021

In the Bangalore Times Most Desirable Women list, she was placed 26th in 2019, and 23rd in 2020. Sreeleela is a celebrity endorser for several brands including Yardley London and Santoor, Mamaearth and Naturals Salon.

== Filmography ==
Key
†	Denotes films that have not yet been released

List of appearances, with year, title, and role shown
Year	Title	Role	Language	Notes	Ref.
2017	Chitrangada	Young Shalini Devi	Telugu	Child artist	
2019	Kiss	Nandini	Kannada		
2019	Bharaate	Radha	Kannada		
2021	Pelli SandaD	Kondaveeti Sahasra	Telugu		
2022	Dhamaka	Pranavi Reddy	Telugu		
2022	By Two Love	Leela	Kannada		
2022	James	Herself	Kannada	Special appearance in the song "Trademark"	
2023	Skanda	Sreeleela Reddy	Telugu		
2023	Bhagavanth Kesari	Vijayalakshmi "Viji"	Telugu		
2023	Aadikeshava	Chitravathi "Chitra"	Telugu		
2023	Extra Ordinary Man	Likitha	Telugu		
2024	Guntur Kaaram	Basavaraju Aamukta "Ammu" Malyada	Telugu		
2024	Pushpa 2: The Rule	Dancer	Telugu	Special appearance in the song "Kissik"	
2025	Robinhood	Neera Vasudev	Telugu		
2025	Junior	Spoorthy	Telugu; Kannada	Bilingual film	
2025	Mass Jathara	Tulasi	Telugu		
2026	Parasakthi	Ratnamala	Tamil		
2026	Ustaad Bhagat Singh	Leela	Telugu		
2026	O.M: Operation Mole	Roja	Tamil		
2027	Untitled Anurag Basu film †	TBA	Hindi	Filming	
2027	Untitled Umesh Bisht film †	TBA	Hindi	Filming	
2027	Dharman †	TBA	Tamil	Filming	
TBA	Dare Devil †	TBA	Tamil	Filming	

== Awards and nominations ==
Award	Year	Category	Work	Result	Ref.
South Indian International Movie Awards	2021	Best Female Debut – Kannada	Kiss	Won	
South Indian International Movie Awards	2022	Most Promising Newcomer – Female	Pelli SandaD	Won	
South Indian International Movie Awards	2023	Best Actress – Telugu	Dhamaka	Won	
South Indian International Movie Awards	2024	Best Actress – Telugu	Bhagavanth Kesari	Nominated	
Filmfare Awards South	2024	Best Supporting Actress – Telugu	Bhagavanth Kesari	Nominated	
IIFA Utsavam	2024	Best Actress – Telugu	Bhagavanth Kesari	Nominated	
Chittara Star Awards	2025	South Icon – Female	—N/a	Nominated	
