= Nilavuku En Mel Ennadi Kobam =

2025 Indian Tamil-film by Dhanush

- Theatrical release poster
- Directed by: Dhanush
- Written by: Dhanush
- Produced by: Dhanush; Kasthuri Raja; Vijayalakshmi Kasthuri
- Starring: Pavish Narayan; Mathew Thomas; Anikha Surendran; Priya Prakash Varrier; R. Sarathkumar; Venkatesh Menon; Siddhartha Shankar; Rabiya Khatoon; Ramya Ranganathan
- Cinematography: Leon Britto
- Edited by: Prasanna GK
- Music by: G. V. Prakash Kumar
- Production companies: Wunderbar Films; RK Productions
- Distributed by: Red Giant Movies
- Release date: 21 February 2025
- Running time: 132 minutes
- Country: India
- Language: Tamil

Nilavuku En Mel Ennadi Kobam (Note: Marketed along with the tagline A Usual Love Story; initialised as NEEK.) (transl. Why is the moon mad at me?) is a 2025 Indian Tamil-language coming-of-age romantic comedy film written, directed and co-produced by Dhanush. The film stars an ensemble cast including Pavish Narayan, Mathew Thomas, Anikha Surendran, Priya Prakash Varrier, R. Sarathkumar, Venkatesh Menon, Rabiya Khatoon and Ramya Ranganathan. The title of this film is derived from a song in the film Policekaran Magal (1962).

Initially, Soundarya Rajinikanth was to direct the film, announced in 2016, with Dhanush starring and Kalaipuli S. Thanu producing, but it failed to materialise. It was reannounced in December 2023 by Dhanush's Wunderbar Films and his father, Kasthuri Raja's RK Entertainment. Principal photography commenced the same month and wrapped in November 2024. The film has music composed by G. V. Prakash Kumar, cinematography handled by Leon Britto and editing by Prasanna GK.

Nilavuku En Mel Ennadi Kobam was released theatrically in India on 21 February 2025 by Red Giant Movies. The film received mixed reviews from critics, becoming a box-office failure.

== Plot ==
Prabhu, a passionate chef in his early twenties, is struggling to move on from a break-up from Nila that happened a year ago. Despite his emotional turmoil, his parents arrange a marriage prospect for him, leading him to meet his childhood friend, Preethi. During their meetings, Prabhu opens up to Preethi about his love story with Nila.

Prabhu's best friend, Rajesh, who is also a chef, and their friend Ravi, who has been in a relationship with Shriya for several years, host an anniversary party. Prabhu and Rajesh cater the event, where Prabhu meets Nila, who is Shriya's best friend. The two begin to develop an interest in each other, and soon, Prabhu's parents approve of their relationship. However, Nila's father is reluctant to give his consent.

During a visit to the hospital, Prabhu learns that Nila's father has stage 4 lung cancer and only has less than six months to live, which Nila is unaware of. In an attempt to ensure Nila spends as much time as possible with her father, Prabhu distances himself from her without telling her the truth. Nila, unaware of the real reason, confronts Prabhu about his sudden withdrawal, but he doesn't respond. The two eventually part ways. Before his death, Nila's father arranges a marriage for her. Groom Arvind, who disliked marriage, had a change of heart after seeing Nila.

In the present, Prabhu receives a wedding invitation from Nila. Preethi suggests that he attend the wedding in Goa, and despite the tension, Prabhu agrees. Upon arrival in Goa, Prabhu and Rajesh meet Nila's wedding planner, Anjali, who starts to take an interest in Prabhu. It is also revealed that Rajesh has long-held feelings for Shriya, but he never expressed them because of her relationship with Ravi.

As the story unfolds, Anjali learns the reason for Prabhu's distance from Nila and reveals it to both Nila and Shriya. Shriya, deeply moved, shares that Nila's father had, in his final days, approved of Prabhu as Nila's future husband. Upon hearing this, Nila admits that she cannot go through with the wedding. The groom, Arvind, encourages her to pursue Prabhu and not go through with a marriage she doesn't want, insisting to be good friends.

Despite Nila's feelings, Prabhu decides to leave Goa and move forward with Preethi, agreeing to marry her. The film concludes with Prabhu and Preethi having a destination wedding, attended by Ravi, Shriya, and Rajesh. Later, Nila, Arvind, and Anjali arrive, hinting that they will pursue their love stories, setting the stage for a potential sequel, titled NEEK 2: Love is in the Air.

== Cast ==
- Pavish Narayan as Prabhu Devachandran, a chef
- Mathew Thomas as Rajesh, a chef and Prabhu's best friend
- Anikha Surendran as Nila Karunakaran, Prabhu's ex-girlfriend (Voice dubbed by Akshaya Prabha)
- Priya Prakash Varrier as Preethi, Prabhu's childhood friend and fiancée (Voice dubbed by Ishwarya)
- R. Sarathkumar as Karunakaran, Nila's father
- Venkatesh Menon as Ravi, Prabhu and Rajesh's friend
- Rabiya Khatoon as Sriya, Ravi's girlfriend, Nila's bestfriend, Rajesh's one-sided lover
- Ramya Ranganathan as Anjali, a wedding planner and Prabhu's one-sided lover
- Aadukalam Naren as Devachandran Prabhakaran, Prabhu's father
- Siddhartha Shankar as Arvindh Siddarth, Nila's ex-husband and one-sided lover
- Saranya Ponvannan as Ponni, Prabhu's mother
- Dr. Karthik Anjaneyan as Doctor
- Sridevi
- Uday Mahesh as Preethi's father
- Akshay Krishna
- Priyanka Mohan (special appearance in the song "Golden Sparrow")
- G. V. Prakash Kumar (special appearance in the song "Pulla")

== Production ==
On 26 September 2016, Soundarya Rajinikanth announced her next directorial venture titled Nilavuku Enmel Ennadi Kobam, which was to be produced by Kalaipuli S. Thanu under V Creations and star her then brother-in-law Dhanush, who wrote the script. However, the project failed to materialise due to casting difficulties. Soundarya, Thanu and Dhanush instead collaborated on Velaiilla Pattadhari 2 (2017).

On Christmas Eve 2023, Dhanush's production house Wunderbar Films and his father Kasthuri Raja and mother Vijayalakshmi Kasthuri's production house RK Production officially announced that they would produce Dhanush's third directorial film after Pa. Pandi (2017) and Raayan (2024). It was revealed that the project was the dropped venture that was to be done by Soundarya, Dhanush and Thanu. Along with the title of the film, principal cast and crew were announced, where the cast consists of Pavish Narayan, Anikha Surendran, Priya Prakash Varrier, making her debut in Tamil cinema and Mathew Thomas in his second Tamil film after Leo (2023), Venkatesh Menon, Rabiya Khatoon and Ramya Ranganathan, and the crew consists of cinematographer Leon Britto, editor Prasanna GK, music composer G. V. Prakash Kumar, choreographer Baba Bhaskar, production designer Jackie, visual director and costume designer Kavya Sriram and publicity designer Kabilan. The film's title was derived from a song from Policekaran Magal (1962). Principal photography commenced on 16 December 2023 in Chennai, and wrapped in November 2024.

== Music ==
Nilavuku En Mel Ennadi Kobam

Soundtrack album by G. V. Prakash Kumar
- Released: 2025
- Genre: Film soundtrack
- Language: Tamil
- Label: Wunderbar Studios
- Producer: G. V. Prakash Kumar

G. V. Prakash Kumar chronology
Emergency (2025)	Nilavuku En Mel Ennadi Kobam (2025)	Kingston (2025)

Singles from Nilavuku En Mel Ennadi Kobam
- 1. "Golden Sparrow" Released: 30 August 2024; 2. "Kadhal Fail" Released: 25 November 2024; 3. "Yedi" Released: 20 December 2024; 4. "Pulla" Released: 4 February 2025; 5. "Nee Paathi Naa Paathi" Released: 29 March 2025

The music is composed by G. V. Prakash Kumar, in which marks his eight collaboration with Dhanush (Note: G. V. Prakash Kumar and Dhanush previously collaborated on Polladhavan (2007), Aadukalam (2011), Mayakkam Enna (2011), Asuran (2019), Maaran (2022), Vaathi (2023), and Captain Miller (2024).) and his maiden collaboration with Dhanush as a director. The first single "Golden Sparrow", sung by Prakash himself, along with Dhanush, Arivu, and singer Sublahshini, was released on 30 August 2024. Featuring lyrics primarily by Arivu, Dhanush's son Yatra wrote four lines, marking his debut as lyricist. The second single "Kadhal Fail" was released on 25 November 2024. The third single "Yedi" was released on 20 December 2024. The fourth single "Pulla" was released on 4 February 2025.

Tamil
No.	Title	Lyrics	Singer(s)	Length
1.	"Golden Sparrow"	Arivu	Sublahshini, G. V. Prakash Kumar, Dhanush, Arivu	3:50
2.	"Kadhal Fail"	Dhanush	Dhanush	4:03
3.	"Yedi"	Vivek	Dhanush, Jonita Gandhi	3:21
4.	"Pulla"	Dhanush	G. V. Prakash Kumar	3:06
5.	"Nee Paathi Naa Paathi"	Dhanush	Santhosh Hariharan	3:19

== Release ==
=== Theatrical ===
Nilavuku En Mel Ennadi Kobam was initially scheduled to be released theatrically on 21 December 2024, which was postponed to 7 February 2025, but was postponed once again to avoid a box-office clash with Vidaamuyarchi. It was released on 21 February 2025, clashing with Dragon.

=== Distribution ===
Red Giant Movies acquired the distribution rights of the film in Tamil Nadu.

=== Home media ===
Nilavuku En Mel Ennadi Kobam began streaming on Amazon Prime Video from 21 March 2025.

== Reception ==
=== Critical response ===
Nilavuku En Mel Ennadi Kobam received mixed reviews from critics, who praised the performances of the cast (particularly of Mathew Thomas and Ramya Ranganathan), G. V. Prakash's background score, soundtrack and the cinematography, while the narrative and lack of romantic chemistry received criticism.

M. Suganth of The Times of India gave 3/5 stars and wrote that despite its shortfalls, "NEEK is further proof that Dhanush had solid filmmaking skills and can flit between diverse genres with ease. It's just that the film, to paraphrase a line from it, is likeable but stops short of being loveable." Anusha Sundar of OTTplay gave 3/5 stars and wrote, "Dhanush, in his third outing with NEEK, is to be appreciated for trying to tell different stories as a director. Even as the film may have some middling parts, NEEK is that one enjoyable, no-frills entertainer that delivers exactly what the director promised you with --- “jolly-ah vanga, jolly-ah ponga." Avinash Ramachandran of The Indian Express gave 3/5 stars and wrote "Dhanush's third directorial, featuring a bunch of sprightly young actors is a rather simple and enjoyable film that doesn't aim for the moon while attempting to create stars."

Kirubhakar Purushothaman of News18 gave 3/5 stars and wrote "Nilavukku Enmel Ennadi Kobam has an age-old story with cliches, but the ethos is new. [...] The romance in Nilavuku Enmel Ennadi Kobam is silly and saccharine. The lines are appallingly childish and feel like it is out of decade-old films." Sushmita Dey of Times Now gave 3/5 stars and wrote, "In a nutshell, NEEK is a breezy, entertaining ride that succeeds in its aim to deliver a light-hearted, fun love story. Dhanush might still be finding his rhythm as a director, but this film is a promising step forward, one that balances humour with relatable, modern themes, making it an enjoyable watch for the Gen Z crowd and beyond". Janani K of India Today gave 2.5/5 stars and wrote, "NEEK's climax could either bring down the roof or make you think, why? But, the film's non-judgemental stance and hilarious one-liners make it a passable affair." Gopinath Rajendran of The Hindu wrote "But despite some intriguing moments, NEEK has its fair share of flaws thanks to convenient writing and underwhelming performances."

=== Box office ===
According to trade analyst Manobala Vijayabalan, Nilavuku En Mel Ennadi Kobam earned around ₹11.5 crore (US$1.2 million) domestically by the end of its theatrical run. He considered the film a box office failure as it could not recover its budget.
