= Sublahshini =

Indian playback singer (born 2000)

- Born: Sublahshini Ganesan; 17 July 2000 (age 26); Chennai, Tamil Nadu, India
- Origin: India
- Genres: Classical; Pop; Jazz; Playback
- Occupations: Singer; playback singer; composer; lyricist
- Instrument: Vocals
- Years active: 2021–present
- Labels: T-Series; Saregama; Think Music; Sun Pictures; Wunderbar Studios

Sublahshini (born 17 July 2000) is an Indian playback singer and independent musician from Chennai, Tamil Nadu. She is known for her work in Tamil cinema, Telugu cinema, and Hindi cinema, including the songs "Monica" from Coolie (2025), "Golden Sparrow" from Nilavuku En Mel Ennadi Kobam (2025), and "Kissik" from Pushpa 2: The Rule (2024). Her independent albums, such as "Kaathadi" and "Namma Chennai", have gained attention for blending traditional Indian music with contemporary pop. Sublahshini has collaborated with composers like Anirudh Ravichander, G. V. Prakash Kumar, and Devi Sri Prasad.

== Early life and background ==
Sublahshini was born on 17 July 2000 in Chennai, Tamil Nadu. Her father is a retired bank officer and her mother is a housewife, and she has an older brother. She studied in Ethiraj College for Women in Chennai. She participated in singing competitions in school and college. She started singing songs and posting on Instagram in 2017. Initially insecure about her deep voice, she honed her skills through participation in a Tamil singing contest in 2020, which led to a collaboration with music producer Nucleya. This collaboration helped her gain recognition and helped her quit her human resources job to focus on music full-time.

== Career ==
=== Independent music ===
Sublahshini began her career in 2021 with independent music releases, including the albums "Kaathadi", "Kan Thoora", "Kanda Kanavu", and "Tell The World". Her debut single "Kaathadi," created with Anand Kashinath during the COVID-19 pandemic, became a hit and was praised by actor Dulquer Salmaan, boosting her confidence. Her 2024 single "Namma Chennai" paid tribute to her hometown, blending cultural references with vibrant production. She has collaborated frequently with Anand Kashinath, Keba Jeremiah, and others, fusing traditional Indian music with contemporary pop. Sublahshini has also mentioned working on an English album. After hearing "Kathaadi" song G. V. Prakash Kumar have get chance to sing a song in Nilavuku En Mel Ennadi Kobam.

=== Playback singing ===
Sublahshini debuted as a playback singer with "Golden Sparrow" from Nilavuku En Mel Ennadi Kobam (2025), directed by Dhanush and composed by G. V. Prakash Kumar. Sung alongside Dhanush, Arivu, and G. V. Prakash Kumar, the song received praise for her vocals. In 2024, she sang "Kissik" for Pushpa 2: The Rule, composed by Devi Sri Prasad, with vocals alongside Lothika. Her performance in "Monica" from Coolie (2025), composed by Anirudh Ravichander, further solidified her reputation. The song became a huge hit with widespread acclaim. Sung in Tamil, Telugu, and Hindi with Anirudh and Asal Kolaar, the song was praised for its energetic vibe and choreography. She has also contributed to other tracks like "Pottala Muttaye" from Thalaivan Thalaivii (2025).

== Discography ==
=== Film songs ===
Year	Song	Film	Language	Composer	Co-singers	Lyricist	Notes	Ref.
2024	"Golden Sparrow"	Nilavuku En Mel Ennadi Kobam	Tamil	G. V. Prakash Kumar	Dhanush, Arivu, G. V. Prakash Kumar	Arivu		
2024	"Golden Sparrow"	Jabilamma Neeku Antha Kopama	Telugu	G. V. Prakash Kumar	Aswin Satya, Sudheesh Sasikumar	Rambabu Gosala	Dubbed version	
2024	"O Oye Pilla"	Ramnagar Bunny	Telugu	Ashwin Hemanth		Avinash Ravinuthala		
2024	"Kissik"	Pushpa 2: The Rule	Telugu	Devi Sri Prasad		Chandrabose		
2024	"Kissik"	Pushpa 2: The Rule	Hindi	Devi Sri Prasad	Lothika	Raqueeb Alam	Dubbed version	
2024	"Kissik"	Pushpa 2: The Rule	Tamil	Devi Sri Prasad		Viveka	Dubbed version	
2024	"Kissik"	Pushpa 2: The Rule	Kannada	Devi Sri Prasad		Varadaraj Chikkaballapura	Dubbed version	
2025	"Raasa Raasa"	Kingston	Tamil	G. V. Prakash Kumar		Yugabharathi		
2025	"Pottala Muttaye"	Thalaivan Thalaivii	Tamil	Santhosh Narayanan		Vivek		
2025	"Monica"	Coolie	Tamil	Anirudh Ravichander	Anirudh Ravichander& Asal Kolaar	Vishnu Edavan		
2025	"Monica"	Coolie	Telugu	Anirudh Ravichander	Anirudh Ravichander	Krishna Kanth	Dubbed version	
2025	"Monica"	Coolie	Malayalam	Anirudh Ravichander	Anirudh Ravichander	Deepak Ram	Dubbed version	
2025	"Monica"	Coolie	Kannada	Anirudh Ravichander	Anirudh Ravichander	Kumaar	Dubbed version	
2025	"Monica"	Coolie The Powerhouse	Hindi	Anirudh Ravichander	Anirudh Ravichander	Kumaar	Dubbed version	
2025	"Jaalakaari"	Balti	Malayalam	Sai Abhyankkar		Vinayak Sasikumar		
2025	"My Heartu Spinning"	Idli Kadai	Tamil	G. V. Prakash Kumar	A. R. Ameen	Falcon		
2025	"My Heartu Spinning"	Idli Kadai - (((D)))	Telugu	G. V. Prakash Kumar	S. P. Abhishek	Samrat Naidu		
2025	"Let’S Do Some Crazy Party"	Ari: My Name is Nobody	Telugu	Anup Rubens		Purnachary Challury		
2025	"Mannaru Vandhaaru"	Aaromaley	Tamil	Siddhu Kumar		Vignesh Ramakrishna		
2025	"Kannumuzhi"	Mask	Tamil	G. V. Prakash Kumar	Anthony Daasan	Karumathur Manimaran		
2025	"Vaazhve Pogudhe"	Yellow	Tamil	Anand Kashinath		Herself	Debut as a Lyricist	
2025	"Thaenkoodey"	Middle Class	Tamil	Pranav Muniraj	Sean Roldan	Surya Bharathi A.A		
2025	"Chendipoova (Version-2)"	Angammal	Tamil	Mohammed Maqbool Mansoor		Muthamil		
2025	"Mu Dha La Li"	Vaa Vaathiyaar	Tamil	Santhosh Narayanan		Durai		
2026	"Pretty Baby"	Biker	Telugu	Ghibran Vaibodha	Yazin Nizar	Krishna Kanth		
2026	"Pretty Baby"	Biker	Tamil	Ghibran Vaibodha	Yazin Nizar	Mohan Rajan	Dubbed Version	
2026	"Ennai Polave"	With Love	Tamil	Sean Roldan	-	Uma Devi		
2026	"Aiyo Kadhaley (Female Version)	With Love	Telugu	Sean Roldan	-	-	Dubbed Version	
2026	"Anjaana Anjaani"	The Paradise	Telugu	Anirudh Ravichander		Kittu Vissapragada		
2026	"Anjaana Anjaani"	The Paradise	Hindi	Anirudh Ravichander	Ritesh G Rao	Ritesh G Rao	Dubbed Version	
2026	"Naan Meendum Pirandhene"	The Paradise	Tamil	Anirudh Ravichander	Inno Genga	Mali	Dubbed Version	
2026	"Unakke Nizhalaanen"	Scene	Tamil	Sushin Shyam	Vijay Narain	Kaber Vasuki		

=== Singles ===
Year	Song	Composer	Lyrics	Co-singer	Ref.
2021	Kanaa	Nucleya, Sublahshini	Sublahshini, 2jaym	Nucleya, 2jaym	
2021	Vizhi Paarayo	Sublahshini, Anand Kashinath	Sublahshini	Anand Kashinath	
2021	Kanda Kanavu	Sublahshini, Anand Kashinath	Sublahshini	Anand Kashinath	
2021	Kaathadi	Anand Kashinath	Sublahshini		
2021	Kan Thoora	Sublahshini, Anand Kashinath	Sublahshini	Anand Kashinath	
2021	Tell The World	Sublahshini, Anand Kashinath, Raemus Castelino	Sublahshini	Anand Kashinath, Mr. Kev	
2022	Pugaipadam	Sublahshini, Anand Kashinath	Sublahshini		
2022	Paranoia	Sublahshini, Anand Kashinath, Raemus Castelino	Sublahshini, Mr. Kev	Anand Kashinath, Mr. Kev	
2023	Namma Chennai	Sublahshini, Anand Kashinath, Raemus Castelino	Sublahshini, Mr. Kev	Anand Kashinath, Mr. Kev	
2023	Mudhal Iravu	Cheran	Vignesh Jeyapal	Cheran	
2025	Yethetho	M. S Krsna	M. S Krsna	M. S Krsna	
2025	Konji Urakura	Teejay Arunasalam	Adesh Krishna	Teejay Arunasalam	
2026	Paatha Edathila	808Krshna	Adesh Krishna, Thejas Krishna	808Krshna	
2026	Pocha	Sublahshini	Sublahshini		
