= Pushpa 2: The Rule =

2024 Indian film by Sukumar

- Theatrical release poster
- Directed by: Sukumar
- Written by: Sukumar
- Dialogues by: Srikanth Vissa; Sukumar
- Produced by: Naveen Yerneni; Yalamanchili Ravi Shankar
- Starring: Allu Arjun; Rashmika Mandanna; Fahadh Faasil; Jagapathi Babu; Sunil; Rao Ramesh
- Cinematography: Miroslaw Kuba Brozek
- Edited by: Naveen Nooli
- Music by: Devi Sri Prasad
- Production companies: Mythri Movie Makers; Sukumar Writings
- Distributed by: see below
- Release date: 5 December 2024
- Running time: 200 minutes (theatrical); 224 minutes (extended)
- Country: India
- Language: Telugu
- Budget: ₹400–500 crore
- Box office: ₹1,642–1,800 crore (Note: Pushpa 2's reported worldwide grosses ₹1642 crore (The Hans India) – ₹1,800 crore (Deccan Chronicle; The Indian Express))

Pushpa 2: The Rule is a 2024 Indian Telugu-language action drama film written and directed by Sukumar and produced by Mythri Movie Makers in association with Sukumar Writings. A sequel to Pushpa: The Rise (2021), it is the second installment in the Pushpa film series. The film stars Allu Arjun in the titular role, alongside Rashmika Mandanna, Fahadh Faasil, Jagapathi Babu, Sunil and Rao Ramesh. It follows Pushpa Raj, a labourer-turned-red sandalwood smuggler, as he faces growing threats from his enemies, including SP Bhanwar Singh Shekhawat.

The sequel was officially announced in December 2021, shortly before the release of the first film, with the title Pushpa 2 and later rebranded as Pushpa 2: The Rule with the release of the first film. Although a portion of the film was initially shot back-to-back with the first film, director Sukumar revised the storyline, leading to principal photography beginning in October 2022. The film features music composed by Devi Sri Prasad, cinematography by Mirosław Kuba Brożek, and editing by Naveen Nooli. Made on a budget of ₹400–500 crore, it is among the most expensive Indian films ever produced. With a runtime of 200–224 minutes, it is also one of the longest Indian films.

Pushpa 2: The Rule was released worldwide on 5 December 2024 in standard, IMAX, 4DX, D-Box and PVR ICE formats to mostly mixed-to-positive reviews from critics. The film was a major commercial success, grossing between 1642 and 1800 crores worldwide, making it the second highest-grossing film in India and the fourth-highest-grossing Indian film worldwide at the time of its release, and registered the highest grossing day 1 for an Indian film at a staggering 275 to 294 crores. A sequel, Pushpa 3: The Rampage, is in development.

== Plot ==
A consignment of red sandalwood arrives at the Yokohama port in Japan, where workers find Pushpa hidden inside a container. He attacks them and demands payment for the load, but is shot and falls into the sea, triggering a flashback.

After humiliating SP Bhanwar Singh Shekhawat IPS, (Note: shown in Pushpa: The Rise (2021)) Pushpa rises to become a respected smuggler, while Shekhawat goes into hiding. Shekhawat later disguises himself as a labourer and intercepts a major sandalwood consignment. Meanwhile, Pushpa meets the Chief Minister of Andhra Pradesh Narasimha Reddy but is denied a photograph with him to avoid political backlash. Offended, Pushpa vows to overthrow the government and install Siddappa as Chief Minister, raising ₹500 crores through sandalwood smuggling.

Pushpa forms a deal with Central Minister Kogatam Veera Pratap Reddy and travels to Maldives to meet international buyer Hameed, agreeing to sell 2,000 tonnes of sandalwood for ₹5,000 crores. Several smugglers join his syndicate, but Mangalam Srinu, Dakshayani and Shekhawat plot against him. Shekhawat kills a syndicate member, frightening the others into urging Pushpa to surrender leadership to Srinu. Siddappa later attempts to settle the rivalry between Pushpa and Shekhawat by asking Pushpa to apologise, but Pushpa instead humiliates Shekhawat for being a corrupt cop. Shekhawat vows to seize every consignment of red sandalwood.

Pushpa nevertheless outmanoeuvres Shekhawat, transporting the sandalwood towards Chennai for shipment to Sri Lanka. Shekhawat intercepts the convoy and shoots at the trucks, forcing the drivers to flee. Although the media praises his raid, Srinu discovers that the seized wood is Sandra, a worthless substitute. Pushpa had secretly transported the genuine sandalwood in bullock carts, inadvertently using Shekhawat's raid as a diversion. Shekhawat asks Srinu to obtain one tonne of genuine sandalwood to deceive the examination committee and begins tracing Pushpa's original consignment. When reports claim the seized load was genuine, the syndicate panics and demands answers. Pushpa assures them that the real consignment is safe, revealing its location only to Jakka Reddy.

Meanwhile, Srivalli discovers that she is pregnant, delighting Pushpa. His happiness is disrupted when his niece, Kaveri, is assaulted during the Jathara festival by Bugga Reddy and his gang. Pushpa defeats and humiliates them. Shekhawat eventually traces the consignment to Rameswaram by spying on Jakka Reddy, but fails to intercept it before it crosses into Sri Lanka. Hameed's gang is subsequently pursued by police; Hameed's car rolls over, killing Jakka Reddy and seriously injuring Hameed. Hameed tells Shekhawat that the sandalwood is destined for Japan and that Pushpa will receive payment through hawala. Before Hameed can reveal the Japanese broker's identity, Shekhawat kills him, severing the link between Pushpa, the consignment and Japan.

To obtain his payment, Pushpa travels to Japan by hiding in a ship's container. At Yokohama Port, he fights the yakuza, returning the story to its opening. After being shot and falling into the sea, he resurfaces and proves to Japanese boss Hiroshi that he owns the sandalwood. Hiroshi pays him and proposes dealing with him directly in future, eliminating the brokers and strengthening their partnership. Pushpa uses the money to make Siddappa Chief Minister as promised.

Pushpa then visits Jaali Reddy to mourn Jakka Reddy's death, but Jaali rejects his attempt at reconciliation. Shekhawat, meanwhile, is enraged when his seizure of fake sandalwood is about to be exposed and tells others that he fell into a fire and died while burning down the warehouse.

As Pushpa, Siddappa and their allies celebrate, Bugga Reddy kidnaps and assaults Kaveri in revenge for his earlier humiliation. It is revealed that Bugga is the nephew of Minister Veera Pratap Reddy, who tries to persuade Pushpa to spare him. Pushpa rescues Kaveri and kills Bugga, his gang and Subba Reddy, Bugga's father and Pratap Reddy's younger brother. At their funeral, Pratap Reddy, Srinu, Dakshayani, Jaali Reddy, Murugan and the others swear revenge against Pushpa. Pratap Reddy also asks about a mysterious person who was absent from the funeral.

Mohan, Pushpa's elder brother, later apologises for his past mistreatment and accepts Pushpa and his family, inviting them to Kaveri's wedding. In a post-credits scene, as Pushpa reconciles with his estranged family at the wedding, the mysterious figure detonates a bomb. The figure could be Bhanwar Singh Shekhavat.

== Cast ==
- Allu Arjun as Pushpa Raju
- Rashmika Mandana as Srivalli
- Fahadh Faasil as Bhanwar Singh Shekhawat
- Jagapathi Babu as Central Minister Kogatam Veera Pratap Reddy
- Sunil as Mangalam Srinu
- Rao Ramesh as Bhumireddy Siddappa Naidu, MP later CM
- Dhananjaya as Jaali Reddy
- Brahmaji as Sub-Inspector Kupparaju
- Ajay as Molleti Mohan Rao, Pushpa's elder half-brother
- Aadukalam Naren as KVM Narasimha Reddy, CM later Former CM
- Anasuya Bharadwaj as Dakshayani "Daksha", Mangalam Srinu's wife
- Kalpa Latha as Parvatamma, Pushpa's mother
- Adithya Menon as Kogatam Subba Reddy, Pratap Reddy's younger brother and Bugga Reddy's father
- Tarak Ponnappa as Kogatam Bugga Reddy, Pratap Reddy's nephew
- Saurabh Sachdeva as Hameed
- Satya as Japanese translator
- Shanmukh as Jakka Reddy
- Muralidhar Goud as Syndicate member
- Jagadeesh Prathap Bandari as Kesava "Mondelu", Pushpa's friend
- Pavani Karanam as Molleti Kaveri, Pushpa's niece and Mohan's daughter
- Bindu Chandramouli as Kaveri's mother and Mohan's wife
- Dayanand Reddy as Muniratnam, Srivalli's father
- Mime Gopi as Chennai Murugan
- Sritej as Molleti Krishna Rao, Pushpa's second elder half-brother
- Divi Vadthya as Minnu Uma Devi, a TV Reporter
- Aanchal Munjal as Hameed's girlfriend
- Vithaya Pansringarm as Hiroshi, Japanese mafia boss
- Killi Kranthi as Bugga's henchman
- Sreeleela (special appearance in the item number "Kissik")

== Production ==
=== Development ===
Before the release of Pushpa: The Rise in 2021, the film was announced to release in two parts, with the filmmakers stating that the maiden part would release that year, whereas the latter part would release the next year. Initially, 10% of the sequel's footage was shot back-to-back with the first part, however, Sukumar decided to alter the sequel's story. The scripting part of the film was completed by July 2022 in Hyderabad. The official title, Pushpa 2: The Rule, was announced at the end of Pushpa: The Rise. An inaugural muhurat puja ceremony was held on the same day in Hyderabad with the presence of the film's cast and crew.

Sukumar wrote the film's script while Srikanth Vissa wrote the dialogues. Sukumar further retained most of the technicians from previous part including cinematographer Miroslaw Kuba Brozek, editor Karthika Srinivas and Ruben, art director S. Ramakrishna and Monica Nigotre and sound designer Resul Pookutty and Vijay Kumar. Deepali Noor and Sheetal Sharma served as costume designers while Preetisheel Singh was hired as character designer. Peter Hein, Kecha Khamphakdee, Dragon Prakash and Nabakanta were hired as stunt directors. Dance choreographers of the film includes Prem Rakshith, Ganesh Acharya, Sekhar, Vijay Polaki and Shrashti Verma.

=== Casting ===
Allu Arjun, Fahadh Faasil, Rashmika Mandanna, Dhananjaya, Rao Ramesh, Sunil, Anasuya Bharadwaj, Ajay Ghosh and other remaining actors from first part have reprised their respective roles, Jagapathi Babu was roped in for a pivotal role in April 2023. Jagadeesh Prathap Bandari rejoined the cast in February 2024, after he was given bail in suicide abetment case. Saurabh Sachdeva, Tarak Ponnappa, Satya and Adithya Menon were also reported to be the part of the film. Malaika Arora, Triptii Dimri, Janhvi Kapoor, Disha Patani and Shraddha Kapoor, were considered for the item number. However, Sreeleela was later finalised.

=== Filming ===
Principal photography began with a test shoot on 30 October 2022 in Hyderabad. In January 2023, filming took place in Visakhapatnam. In March 2023, scenes were shot in Bangalore. Rumours were circulated that the shooting of the film was stopped as director was unsatisfied but later turned out to be false as shooting was again started after a few days.

In April 2023, forest scenes were shot in Malkangiri district of Odisha. Jagapathi Babu joined cast in April 2023. Fahadh Faasil joined the sets in May 2023 while Rashmika joined the sets in June 2023. On 3 June 2023, the bus carrying crew members met with an accident near the Vijayawada–Hyderabad Expressway. In July 2023, an action sequence was shot in Visakhapatnam Port including 50 stuntmen. In August 2023, scenes were shot in Ramoji Film City. In November 2023, the filming resumed in Hyderabad. In December 2023, the filming was postponed due to Allu Arjun's health.

In March 2024, scenes were shot in Vizag and Yaganti Temple. It was later reported that the makers spent ₹50–60 crore for the Gangamma Jatara performance and a fight sequence. In April 2024, an underwater sequence was shot in Hyderabad. In May 2024, it was reported that the film will have multiple endings and to maintain secrecy the makers opted the no phone policy on the film set. In July 2024, it was reported that shooting of film was delayed due to rift and creative differences between Allu Arjun and Sukumar, however they were later proven to be false rumours as shooting was restarted again in Hyderabad.

Sets depicting 1990s and 2000s Japan and Malaysia were recreated at Ramoji Film City, though there were plans to shoot on location, after the film's production crew conducted thorough recces in Bangkok, Malaysia, and Japan was conducted. It was determined that budget and time constraints prevented the location shoots from happening. In August 2024, the climax of the film was shot. Item number featuring Sreeleela was filmed in November 2024 in Hyderabad. The entire filming was wrapped by late November 2024.

=== Post-production ===
The VFX of the film were provided by Makuta VFX; R.C. Kamalakannan served as the visual effects supervisor. Resul Pookutty and Vijay Kumar served as the sound designers. Shreyas Talpade and Jis Joy dubbed for Allu Arjun in the dubbed Hindi and Malayalam versions, respectively. In May 2024, both Ruben and Karthika Srinivas opted out of the film due to scheduling conflicts and creative differences, resulting in them being replaced by Naveen Nooli; Sukumar's earlier collaborator. The first half of the film was edited by October 2024. Rashmika completed dubbing for her portions by November 2024.

The final copy of the film was ready by late November 2024 and was submitted to the Central Board of Film Certification (CBFC) that month. On 28 November 2024, the film received a U/A certificate from the Censor Board, with a finalised runtime of 200 minutes after few words and excessive violent scenes were censored.

== Music ==
The background score and soundtrack of the film were composed by Devi Sri Prasad, with lyrics written by Chandrabose. The film also features additional background score composed by Sam C. S. Thaman S confirmed that he had also composed additional background music, but the makers ultimately chose to use the final outputs by Prasad and Sam C. S. The music rights of the film were acquired by T-Series for ₹65 crore. The first single titled "Pushpa Pushpa" was released on 1 May 2024. The second single titled "Sooseki (The Couple Song)" was released on 29 May 2024. The third single titled "Kissik" was released on 24 November 2024. The fourth single titled "Peelings" was released on 1 December 2024. The fifth single titled "Gango Renuka Thalli" was released on 5 December 2024 along with the album.

== Marketing ==
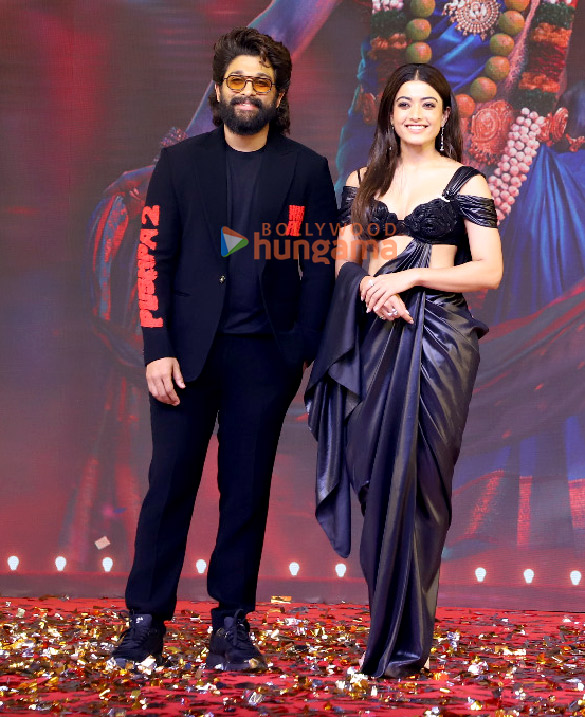
Allu Arjun, Rashmika Mandanna promotion of Pushpa 2: The Rule in Mumbai

The first-look poster along with an announcement glimpse video was released on 8 April 2023, coinciding with Allu Arjun's 41st birthday. The teaser of the film was released a year later on 8 April 2024, coinciding with Arjun's 42nd birthday. A press meet was held on 24 October 2024 in Hyderabad where the new release date of the film was revealed.

Promotional activities were scheduled in Patna, Kolkata, Chennai, Kochi, Bengaluru, Mumbai and Hyderabad. The film's trailer was released on 17 November 2024 at an event in Gandhi Maidan, Patna. On 24 November 2024, a pre-release event was held in Leo Muthu Indoor Stadium, Sri Sai Ram Engineering College in Chennai. On 27 November 2024, pre-release event was held at Liwa Hall, Grand Hyatt in Kochi. A press-meet was held on 29 November 2024 in JW Marriott Sahar in Mumbai. On 2 December 2024, pre-release event was held in Police Grounds, Yousufguda in Hyderabad. Later, special press conferences were held on 7 December 2024 in Hyderabad and 12 December 2024 in New Delhi. On 9 February 2025, a success meet was held in Hyderabad.

== Release ==
=== Theatrical ===
Pushpa: The Rule was theatrically released on 5 December 2024 in standard, IMAX, 4DX, D-Box and ICE formats. Apart from the original Telugu language, it was released in the Hindi, Tamil, Kannada, Bengali and Malayalam languages. A 3D version of the film was initially scheduled to be released on the same day, however, the shows were postponed to 13 December 2024.

Initially, the film was announced by the makers to release on 15 August 2024, coinciding with India's Independence Day. However, due to unfinished shooting and post-production work, it was postponed to 6 December 2024, before being changed to 5 December. It was slated to be the first Pan-Indian film to release in the Bengali language. However, the Bengali dubbed version was not theatrically released.

The film was reported to release in more than 12,000 screens worldwide. In the overseas market it was released in more than 5,000 screens. On January 16, the film was released in Japan, approximately 411 days after the original release, Allu Arjun visited Japan for the release and interacted with the Japanese audience. A reloaded version of the film containing additional 20 minutes of footage was set to release on 11 January 2024. However it was postponed to 17 January 2025 due to technical issues.

=== Distribution ===
The North India distribution rights were acquired by Anil Thadani's AA Films for ₹200 crore. The distribution rights for North America were acquired by Prathyangira Cinemas and AA Creations. The Kerala and Karnataka distribution rights were acquired by E4 Entertainment and N Cinemas respectively. AGS Entertainment acquired the Tamil Nadu distribution rights. Forum Films distributed the film in Australia and New Zealand while AA Films UK Ltd. distributed across United Kingdom and Friday Entertainment distributed in France.

The ticket price hikes were estimated to be around ₹354 in single screen theatres and ₹531 in multiplexes across Telangana, and ₹324.5 in single screen theatres and ₹413 in multiplexes across Andhra Pradesh. The price for special premiere shows on 4 December was hiked by ₹800 across Telangana.

=== Pre-release business ===
The film set a record of doing the highest pre-release business in India, with combined theatrical and non-theatrical earnings of ₹1085 crores.

Prior to its release, the film made a business of nearly ₹640 crore (US$68 million) from its theatrical rights. The Andhra Pradesh and Telangana distribution rights were sold for ₹220 crore (US$24 million). The Hindi dubbed distribution rights were sold for ₹200 crore (US$21 million). The film made a combined deal of ₹100 crore (US$11 million) from distribution in Tamil Nadu, Karnataka and Kerala theatres. The overseas distribution rights were sold for ₹140 crore (US$15 million). It further made ₹425 crore (US$45 million) from non-theatrical rights, including digital, satellite and music rights.

The film started its advance booking on 30 November 2024. The film minted record advance booking sales grossing ₹100 crores worldwide and selling around 2 million tickets in its pre-bookings alone. The film also set the record for being the fastest movie to sell 1 million tickets on BookMyShow surpassing Baahubali 2: the Conclusion, K.G.F: Chapter 2, and Kalki 2898 AD.

=== Home media ===
The digital streaming television rights of the film were acquired by Netflix for ₹275 crore. The film's reloaded version, which included over 20 minutes of additional footage, began streaming on Netflix from 30 January 2025 in Telugu and dubbed versions of Hindi, Tamil, Malayalam and Kannada languages. Later, English and Bengali dubbed version was also released on the platform.

== Reception ==
=== Critical response ===
Pushpa 2: The Rule received mixed reviews from critics.

Nishad Thaivalappil of News18 gave 5/5 stars and wrote "Pushpa 2: The Rule is a raw, wild, and action-packed extravaganza. With its gripping narrative, larger-than-life performances, and massy appeal, it's the entertainer of the year. Don't miss the chance to witness Allu Arjun's brilliance on the big screen!" Taran Adarsh of Bollywood Hungama gave 4.5/5 stars and wrote "A wildfire entertainer with mass appeal, blending intense action, gripping drama, emotional depth and Allu Arjun's unmatched swag which elevates the film, making it a must-watch for fans and audiences alike". Simran Singh of DNA India gave 4.5/5 stars and wrote "Pushpa The Rule: Part Two will RULE the box office. The sky is the limit for this film. Allu Arjun and the team have set new standards in massy entertainers, and very high expectations for the third part. Yes, the saga of Pushpa will continue. Don't miss Pushpa The Rule: Part Two at any chance."

Ganesh Aaglave of Firstpost gave 4/5 stars and wrote "On the whole, Pushpa 2 is bigger, grander and better as Allu Arjun is set to rule the box office with its swag." Neeshita Nyayapati of Hindustan Times wrote "At the end of it all, Pushpa 2: The Rule is entertaining, makes you chuckle and also feel something for its titular character, even if not flawless and has a shallow message about women's safety. And when you don't notice a runtime as long as this one, that's a win". Paul Nicodemus of The Times of India gave 3.5/5 stars and wrote "Pushpa 2: The Rule is a sequel that surpasses its predecessor in scale, storytelling, and emotional depth. Sukumar's vision, combined with Allu Arjun's powerhouse performance, layered narrative, breathtaking visuals, and stellar ensemble cast, makes it a cinematic triumph that demands to be experienced on the big screen."

Anandu Suresh of The Indian Express gave 2.5/5 stars and wrote "The simplest and shortest review of Pushpa 2 would be: "Sarvam Pushpa Mayam. (transl. Everything is about "Pushpa")"". Janani K of India Today rated the film 2.5 out of 5 stars and wrote "Compared to the first part, Pushpa 2 feels somewhat disjointed. The sequel focuses more on creating moments rather than building a coherent story". Pranati A S of Deccan Herald rated 2.5/5 and wrote, "Fahadh steals the show with his restlessness and humour. Devi Sri Prasad's music is nothing exceptional. Mirosław Kuba Brożek's cinematography is brilliant, these are some takeaways from the otherwise excessively overblaring film."

Sajin Shrijith of The Week gave the film 2 out of 5 stars and wrote "A massive insult to intelligence and peelings". Saibal Chatterjee of NDTV rated the film 2.5 out of 5 stars and stated "Pushpa Part 2 goes hell for leather but large parts of the film are crushed under the weight of its own vaulting ambition". Arjun Menon of Rediff rated the film 2 out of 5 stars and wrote "Pushpa 2 is a badly misjudged, doubtful sequel that can't capitalise on the wealth of the story world set up in the first film". Sanyukta Thakare of Mashable India gave the film 1.5 out of 5 stars and wrote "Pushpa 2: The Rule does not add anything new to the barrage of similar south characters, nor the action showcased by the entertainment industry".

Sangeetha Devi Dundoo of The Hindu wrote "A stunning 'jatara' sequence anchored by a superb Allu Arjun and a few face-offs, director Sukumar's ‘Pushpa 2: The Rule’ seems incoherent and incomplete." Lekha Menon of Khaleej Times wrote "The music is loud, the editing at several places is disjointed and the action choreography basically includes characters flying in air and Pushpa beating the bad guys to pulp. All of this takes place over a mammoth 205 minutes and while it's entertaining and pacy, the overall experience makes for a tedious watch." Swathi P Ajith of Onmanorama wrote, "More than just the story, 'Pushpa 2' promises to be an unforgettable experience, especially for Allu Arjun's fans. It's clear that he has poured his heart and soul into this role, making every moment on screen tantalising."

=== Box office ===
On its opening day, the film grossed ₹280 crore worldwide becoming the highest day-one grossing Indian film till date and the highest day-one grossing film ever in India, with ₹200 crore from the domestic market. The Hindi version collected a nett amount of ₹72 crore on the opening day, in India. Pushpa 2: The Rule became the fastest Indian film to reach ₹400 crore in two days and ₹500 crore in three days.

In the United States, the film debuted at the number five position earning US$1,700,000 (equivalent to $1,744,723 in 2025) on its opening day and is projected to earn US$6,000,000 (equivalent to $6,157,844 in 2025) in its opening weekend. As per Deadline Hollywood, the four-day gross is estimated to be ₹590 crore ($70 million) in India and ₹172 crore ($20 million) from the overseas markets, making its global debut grossing ₹762 crore ($90 million). In its first weekend, it earned $4.9 million from U.S. and Canadian theaters placing at 5th position as per The Seattle Times.

On its eighth day of release, the film entered in ₹1000 crore club. (Note: According to the makers, the film entered the 1000 crore club in six days, grossing over 1002 crore, while Box Office India reported that it crossed the 1000 crore mark in eight days.) The film has grossed ₹1,004 crore worldwide in eight days, with ₹813 crore and ₹191 crore from domestic and international markets. The film collected a worldwide gross of ₹1,226 crore in its eleven-day run, with ₹1,009 and ₹217 crore (equivalent to ₹231 crore or US$25 million in 2026) from domestic and international markets. It continued to remain at the Global Comscore rankings in its second weekend (11 days) with a gross in the home market estimated to be ₹1014 crore ($120M) and worldwide at ₹1414 crore ($167M).

Daily News and Analysis reported that the film has earned ₹1,290.92 crore domestically in 19 days, with a total worldwide gross of ₹1,570.92 crore, including ₹280 crore from international markets. The Indian Express reported that on its 20th day, the film's net earnings in India alone grossed ₹1,100 crore, with ₹700 crore crore coming from the Hindi version, making it the first film to reach the mark. As per Box Office India its twenty-day worldwide gross collection stands at ₹1,456 crore. The film's twenty-two days worldwide gross was ₹1,505 crore. The film collected a domestic gross of रु 27.03 crore in Nepal, thus becoming the highest-grossing foreign film and the second-highest-grossing film in the country. The Indian Express reported the twenty-five days gross collection is around ₹1,719.5 crore.

As of 2 January 2025, the Hindi version had earned ₹769.75 crore. It reached ₹797.70 crore by its fourth week (28 days). As of 13 January 2025, the film has earned ₹1408.81 crore ($162.9 million) in India. The film concluded its theatrical run with worldwide gross estimated to be 1,642–1,800 crore. The film recorded the highest footfall post-COVID pandemic, with 6.30–6.50 crore, including 3.90 crore from Hindi markets alone.

== Accolades ==
Award (Note: Awards, festivals and organizations are in alphabetical order.)	Date of ceremony (Note: Date is linked to the article about the awards held that year, wherever possible.)	Category	Recipient(s)	Result	Ref.
Filmfare Awards South	21 February 2026	Best Film – Telugu	Naveen Yerneni, Y. Ravi Shankar	Won	
Filmfare Awards South	21 February 2026	Best Director – Telugu	Sukumar	Won	
Filmfare Awards South	21 February 2026	Best Actor – Telugu	Allu Arjun	Won	
Filmfare Awards South	21 February 2026	Best Actress – Telugu	Rashmika Mandanna	Nominated	
Filmfare Awards South	21 February 2026	Best Supporting Actor – Telugu	Fahadh Faasil	Nominated	
Filmfare Awards South	21 February 2026	Best Music Director – Telugu	Devi Sri Prasad	Won	
Filmfare Awards South	21 February 2026	Best Playback Singer – Female	Shreya Ghoshal – (for "Sooseki")	Nominated	
Filmfare Awards South	21 February 2026	Best Production Designer	S. Rama Krishna and Monika Niggotre S.	Won	
Sakshi Excellence Awards	1 March 2025	Most Popular Movie of the Year	Naveen Yerneni, Y. Ravi Shankar	Won	
Sakshi Excellence Awards	1 March 2025	Most Popular Director of the Year	Sukumar	Won	
Sakshi Excellence Awards	1 March 2025	Most Popular Actor of the Year	Allu Arjun	Won	
Sakshi Excellence Awards	1 March 2025	National Wide Popular Actress of the Year	Rashmika Mandanna	Won	
South Indian International Movie Awards	5 September 2025	Best Film – Telugu	Mythri Movie Makers, Muttamsetty Media	Nominated	
South Indian International Movie Awards	5 September 2025	Best Director – Telugu	Sukumar	Nominated	
South Indian International Movie Awards	5 September 2025	Best Cinematographer – Telugu	Miroslaw Kuba Brozek	Nominated	
South Indian International Movie Awards	5 September 2025	Best Actor – Telugu	Allu Arjun	Won	
South Indian International Movie Awards	5 September 2025	Best Actress – Telugu	Rashmika Mandanna	Won	
South Indian International Movie Awards	5 September 2025	Best Supporting Actress – Telugu	Pavani Karanam	Nominated	
South Indian International Movie Awards	5 September 2025	Best Actor in a Negative Role – Telugu	Fahadh Faasil	Nominated	
South Indian International Movie Awards	5 September 2025	Best Music Director – Telugu	Devi Sri Prasad	Won	
South Indian International Movie Awards	5 September 2025	Best Lyricist – Telugu	Chandrabose – (for "Sooseki")	Nominated	
South Indian International Movie Awards	5 September 2025	Best Male Playback Singer – Telugu	Shankarr Babu Kandukoori – (for "Peelings")	Won	
South Indian International Movie Awards	5 September 2025	Best Female Playback Singer – Telugu	Shreya Ghoshal – (for "Sooseki")	Nominated	
Telangana Gaddar Film Awards	14 June 2025	Best Actor	Allu Arjun	Won	
Telangana Gaddar Film Awards	14 June 2025	Best Female Playback Singer	Shreya Ghoshal – (for "Sooseki")	Won	

== Controversies ==
On 24 November 2024, at the pre-release event in Chennai, composer Devi Sri Prasad blamed the producers for repeated complaints against him that he failed to deliver the background score and songs on time. He said that the producers have more complaints than love for him. Later at the event, producer Ravi Shankar denied the rift and mentioned that there are no issues, and that they are like a family. There were also reports that Thaman S, B. Ajaneesh Loknath and Sam C. S. were hired to compose the background score due to delays in delivering the score on time by Prasad. This controversy also came into light when Mythri Movie Makers, who are also the producers of Good Bad Ugly (2025), replaced Prasad with G. V. Prakash Kumar. However, during the Hyderabad event Prasad ended the ongoing controversy with producers and thanked them wholeheartedly and highlighted the special bond between them. Later, Sam C. S. confirmed his involvement in the film's background score.

On 30 November 2024, an FIR was filed against Allu Arjun by Srinivas Goud for his comments during the Mumbai press event, where he (Allu Arjun) referred to his fans as an "army". Goud found this comparison disrespectful, arguing that using the term "army" in this context belittles the sacrifices made by the armed forces.

In December 2024, a petition demanding a ban on the film was filed in the Telangana High Court, as the film shows corruption, violence and illegal smuggling, however the plea was dismissed.

On 4 December 2024, a woman died while her young son was critically injured in a stampede during the film's premiere at Sandhya movie theater near RTC X Roads, Hyderabad. A case was later filed under various sections of the Bharatiya Nyaya Sanhita on the film's unit, Allu Arjun, his security team, and the owner of the theatre. Allu Arjun was arrested by the Hyderabad City Police on 13 December 2024 over the said charges. However, a few hours later he was granted interim bail by the Telangana High Court.

== Future ==
The film's post-credits scene showcased the continuation of the story with a cliffhanger and the title for the third part revealed as Pushpa 3: The Rampage.
