= Indraganti =

Indraganti (Telugu: ఇంద్రగంటి) is a Telugu surname. Notable people with the surname include:

- Indraganti Srikanth (1944–2019), Indian lyricist and writer
- Mohana Krishna Indraganti (born 1972), Indian film director
