= Nandi Awards of 1980 =

Indian Telugu film and TV awards ceremony

Nandi Awards presented annually by Government of Andhra Pradesh. First awarded in 1964.

== 1980 Nandi Awards Winners List ==
Category	Winner	Film
Best Feature Film	No award given	
Second Best Feature Film	Dhavala Satyam	Yuvatharam Kadilindi
Third Best Feature Film	S.M.Santhanam	Sangham Maarali
