= Sivappu Malli =

1981 film by Rama Narayanan

- Poster
- Directed by: Rama Narayanan
- Screenplay by: Rajshekar
- Story by: Madala Ranga Rao
- Produced by: M. Saravanan; M. Balasubramaniam
- Starring: Vijayakanth; Chandrashekar; Shanthi Krishna; S. S. Chandran; Aruna
- Cinematography: Lokesh
- Edited by: Vellaichami
- Music by: Shankar–Ganesh
- Production company: Balasubramaniam & Company
- Release date: 15 August 1981
- Country: India
- Language: Tamil

Sivappu Malli (transl. Red Jasmine) is a 1981 Indian Tamil-language film directed by Rama Narayanan for AVM Productions, starring Vijayakanth, Chandrasekhar, Shanthi Krishna, Aruna and S. S. Chandran. A remake of the Telugu film Erra Mallelu (1981), it revolves around two men starting a revolution against their village chiefs and the owner of a factory in the neighbouring village. The film was released on 15 August 1981.

== Plot ==
Sathyanathan, Punyakodi and their partners are an atrocious lot. They keep suppressing the villagers and do not even allow them to get proper education due to fear of losing control over the village. On the other hand, Ranga and Tyagu are honest factory workers who lead the fight against the factory owner for the labourers' rights. The clash between the two sections of society reaches a level where Sathyanathan and a gang plot to eliminate Ranga and Tyagu. They manage to do away with Tyagu; however, Ranga is too smart for them. How Ranga manages to punish the wrong doers is what the second half of the film is all about.

== Cast ==
- Vijayakanth as Ranga
- Chandrashekar as Thyagu
- Shanthi Krishna as Mallika
- Aruna
- Anuradha
- S. S. Chandran
- Sangili Murugan
- Vennira Aadai Moorthy
- Gundu Kalyanam
- K. K. Soundar
- Ramarajan (uncredited)

== Production ==
K. Veerappan, a production executive at AVM Productions, saw the Telugu film Erra Mallelu (1981) and told AVM insiders it was very good; having faith in his words, M. Saravanan bought the remake rights without watching the film. However, Saravanan did not produce the remake, titled Sivappu Malli directly under AVM, but the subsidiary Balasubramaniam & Company. Saravanan wanted Kamal Haasan to portray the lead role, but he declined due to unavailability of dates; the role went to Vijayakanth. The film's puja was held on 20 July 1981, and principal photography was completed within 35 working days, well before the already fixed 15 August release date. Though Vijayakanth was already acting in Saatchi (1983) when he accepted Sivappu Malli, despite both films being shot in different towns, he would film for Sivappu Malli in the evening at Maduranthakam after filming for Saatchi in Salem. Editing was handled by Vellaichami. While discussing about crediting lead actors' names, Chandrasekhar's brother Pandian was insistent about having his brother's name to be placed first in opening credits; due to this reason both Vijayakanth and Chandrasekhar were left uncredited. The makers wanted Vijayakanth's voice to be dubbed by a voice artist; however Vijayakanth insisted to dub for himself, he attended dubbing session during the shoot of Jadhikkoru Needhi.

== Themes ==
Sivappu Malli revolves around the themes of communism and marxism.

== Soundtrack ==
The soundtrack was composed by Shankar–Ganesh, with lyrics by Vairamuthu.

Track listing
No.	Title	Singer(s)	Length
1.	"Erimalai Eppadi Porukkum"	T. M. Soundararajan, T. L. Maharajan	6:20
2.	"Rendu Kannam Santhana Kinnam"	K. J. Yesudas, P. Susheela	4:39
Total length:			10:59

== Release and reception ==
Sivappu Malli was released on 15 August 1981. Sindhu and Jeeva, reviewing the film for Kalki, appreciated Lokesh's cinematography and Vellaichami's editing, especially Lokesh's use of slow motion shots.

== Legacy ==
The song "Erimalai Eppadi Porukkum" became the theme for Vivek's character in Singam (2010).

== Bibliography ==
- Saravanan, M. (2013) [2005]. AVM 60 Cinema (in Tamil) (3rd ed.). Rajarajan Pathippagam. OCLC 1158347612.
