= Chaitanya Ratham =

1987 Telugu film by Dhavala Satyam

- Poster
- Directed by: Dhavala Satyam
- Produced by: Vangaveeti Ratna Kumari
- Starring: Bhanu Chander; Sarath Babu; Kalpana; Kaikala Satyanarayana; Giri Babu
- Cinematography: Mani
- Music by: J. V. Raghavulu
- Production company: Radha Mitra Mandali Movies
- Release date: 26 June 1987
- Country: India
- Language: Telugu

Chaitanya Ratham is a 1987 Indian Telugu-language political drama film directed by Dhavala Satyam and produced by Vangaveeti Ratna Kumari. The film stars Bhanu Chander, Sarath Babu, Kalpana, Satyanarayana and Giri Babu in pivotal roles, with music composed by J. V. Raghavulu. Released on 26 June 1987, it was a commercial success, running for 100 days in 26 centres.

Set against the socio-political backdrop of 1980s Andhra Pradesh, Chaitanya Ratham follows the life of politician Vangaveeti Mohana Ranga, highlighting his struggles alongside his elder brother, Vangaveeti Radha. The film critiques the Telugu Desam Party (TDP) government under N. T. Rama Rao, addressing themes of corruption and resistance. The song "Rama Rajyama," noted for its critical stance against the government, garnered significant attention.

The film faced controversy upon its release due to its politically charged content. Reports suggest that its prints were destroyed following widespread violence after Ranga's assassination in December 1988, with some alleging that this destruction was aimed at suppressing the film's sensitive political narrative. In 2023, a restored version of the film was re-released in the United States.

== Plot ==
The film follows the rise, struggles, and political challenges of the characters Sarathi and Vijay, inspired by Vangaveeti Mohana Ranga and his elder brother, Vangaveeti Radha. Set against the socio-political backdrop of 1980s Andhra Pradesh, it explores Ranga's life, and political career, addressing themes of governance, corruption, and resistance.

== Cast ==
- Bhanu Chander as Sarathi
- Sarath Babu as Vijay
- Kalpana
- Satyanarayana as Vara Prasad
- Giri Babu as S.P. Avinash
- Prabhakar Reddy as Paramahamsa

== Production ==
Chaitanya Ratham was presented by Vangaveeti Mohana Ranga, a Congress MLA representing Vijayawada East constituency, with his wife, Vangaveeti Ratna Kumari, serving as the film's producer. The film was created to address instances of alleged political harassment by the Telugu Desam Party (TDP) government. Directed by Dhavala Satyam, Chaitanya Ratham was released in June 1987, ahead of significant political events, including Ranga's assassination in December 1988 and the Congress Party's subsequent victory in the 1989 Andhra Pradesh Assembly elections.

=== Development ===
The project was developed during a period of heightened political tensions in Andhra Pradesh. Initially hesitant to take on the project due to its politically sensitive nature, Dhavala Satyam sought approval from his Communist Party affiliations before agreeing to direct the film. Dissatisfied with the script provided by one of Ranga's associates, Satyam insisted on writing the story himself. Drawing from extensive interactions with Ranga, Satyam observed his mannerisms, political style, and personal interactions to shape the narrative. Ranga actively participated in the production, contributing details about his life and spending time on the sets.

The film served as a critique of the TDP administration, highlighting the challenges Ranga claimed to have faced under the government and police. Sensitive topics addressed included allegations of police restrictions on Ranga's movements, purportedly fabricated cases against him, and notable incidents such as the custodial death of a rickshaw puller and the public humiliation of a woman in Vijayawada. The title, Chaitanya Ratham, was reportedly chosen as a satirical reference to N. T. Rama Rao's campaign vehicle, which had gained symbolic importance during his statewide political tours.

=== Casting ===
Bhanu Chander was cast in the lead role, with other important roles played by Sarath Babu, Kalpana, Kaikala Satyanarayana, Giri Babu, and Prabhakar Reddy.

In 2002, actor Srihari revealed that Ranga had initially recommended him for the lead role in Chaitanya Ratham. However, Dasari Narayana Rao, who was involved in the project, advised against casting a newcomer for a politically sensitive film, citing the risks involved. Dasari assured Srihari that he would launch him in another project, which eventually happened with Brahma Nayudu (1987).

=== Filming ===
Principal photography for Chaitanya Ratham commenced in Vijayawada, reflecting the film's local and political context.

== Music ==
Chaitanya Ratham

Film score by J. V. Raghavulu
- Released: 1987
- Genre: Soundtrack
- Producer: J. V. Raghavulu

The soundtrack was composed by J. V. Raghavulu with lyrics by Jaladi Raja Rao, Indraganti Srikantha Sarma, and Mailavarapu Gopi. The song "Rama Rajyama" became particularly controversial for its critical tone towards the ruling government.

No.	Title	Lyrics	Singer(s)	Length
1.	"Rama Rajyama"	Jaladi	S. P. Balasubrahmanyam, S. P. Sailaja
2.	"Naalo Navaragame"	Indraganti Srikanth	S. Janaki, Chorus
3.	"Sahasam Jeevitam"	Jaladi	S. P. Balasubrahmanyam, G. Anand
4.	"Vijayabheri Velugutundi"	Jaladi	S. P. Balasubrahmanyam, Chorus
5.	"Hey Neelima"	Mailavarapu Gopi	S. P. Balasubrahmanyam, Chorus
6.	"Aamani Koyila"	Jaladi	S. P. Balasubrahmanyam, S. Janaki

== Release and reception ==
Chaitanya Ratham was released on 26 June 1987 during heightened political tensions in Andhra Pradesh. It gained attention for its bold commentary and faced protests from political circles. Despite the controversy, it was commercially successful, running for 100 days in 26 centres.

Griddaluru Gopala Rao of Zamin Ryot reviewed the film positively, praising Dhavala Satyam's direction for blending contemporary politics with commercial elements. He highlighted the powerful confrontation scenes, impactful dialogues, the film's message of peaceful protest, and the performances of lead actors.

=== Re-release ===
In July 2023, the restored version of Chaitanya Ratham was re-released in the United States, coinciding with Ranga's birth anniversary. Despite these efforts, the film was not re-released in Telugu-speaking states.

== Controversies ==
Chaitanya Ratham sparked significant controversy upon its release, primarily due to its politically charged content. The song "Rama Rajyama" drew particular attention as a direct critique of the ruling Telugu Desam Party (TDP) government. While N. T. Rama Rao's administration was often compared to "Rama Rajyam," symbolizing an ideal government, the song used this concept to highlight alleged corruption and misconduct within the regime. This bold portrayal reportedly caused discomfort among the ruling party and its supporters.

The controversy surrounding Chaitanya Ratham created challenges for director Dhavala Satyam in securing producers for future projects. He subsequently collaborated with his mentor Dasari Narayana Rao on the 1988 film Intinti Bhagavatam.

== Legacy ==
Chaitanya Ratham, based on the life of Vangaveeti Mohana Ranga, is believed to have influenced notable political developments following its release. Film critic and historian Rentala Jayadeva noted that the film reflected contemporary politics and societal issues of the 1980s.

The assassination of Ranga in December 1988 triggered riots in Coastal Andhra, resulting in 42 deaths, extensive property damage, and a 40-day curfew in Vijayawada. Media outlets such as Doordarshan and BBC reportedly highlighted the controversial song "Rama Rajyama" while examining the circumstances surrounding Ranga's assassination. Allegations suggest that all prints of the film were intentionally destroyed to suppress its politically sensitive content and prevent its further dissemination. However, a surviving print was later discovered and restored using advanced technology.

=== Planned spiritual sequel ===
In 2016, Dhavala Satyam announced plans for a biographical film on Vangaveeti Mohana Ranga, focusing on his rise to power and assassination. Intended as a spiritual sequel to Chaitanya Ratham, the narrative was set to emphasize Ranga's leadership and the impact of his assassination, a pivotal event that shocked the state of Andhra Pradesh. However, the project did not materialize.

== See also ==
- 1989 Andhra Pradesh Legislative Assembly election
