= Mahmood Farooqui =

Indian writer, performer and director

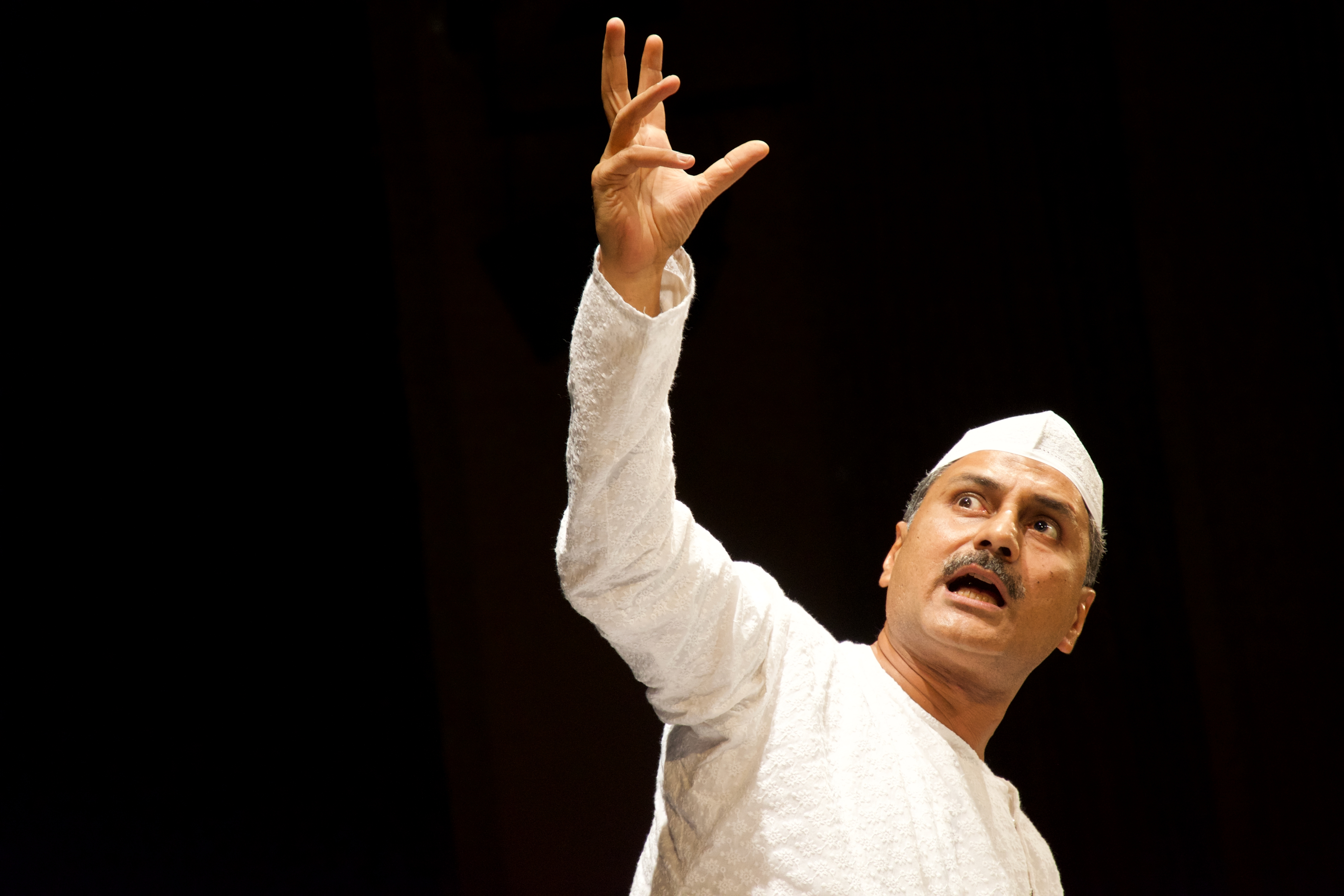
- Born: Gorakhpur, Uttar Pradesh, India
- Education: The Doon School; St. Stephen's College, Delhi; St. Peter's College, Oxford
- Occupations: Author and storyteller
- Spouse: Anusha Rizvi

Mahmood Farooqui is an Indian writer, performer and director. He specializes in a type of story-telling known as Dastangoi. Farooqui along with his uncle Shamsur Rahman Faruqi, noted Urdu poet and literary critic, revived Dastangoi, the ancient art of Urdu story telling. He was awarded the Ustad Bismillah Khan Yuva Puraskar in 2010 for it.

His book Besieged: voices from Delhi 1857 was awarded the Ramnath Goenka for the best Non-fiction book of the year. This book is a translation of mutiny papers providing a glimpse into the lives of ordinary people who found themselves stuck during the revolt of 1857. He was also a researcher for The Last Mughal, a book by William Dalrymple.

In August 2016 he was found guilty of rape by a lower court, but in September 2017 he was acquitted by the Delhi High Court. The High Court judgment was later upheld by the Supreme Court.

== Education ==
Farooqui completed his schooling from The Doon School and went on to read history at St. Stephen's College, Delhi. He was awarded a Rhodes Scholarship to read history at St. Peter's College, University of Oxford.

== Dastangoi ==
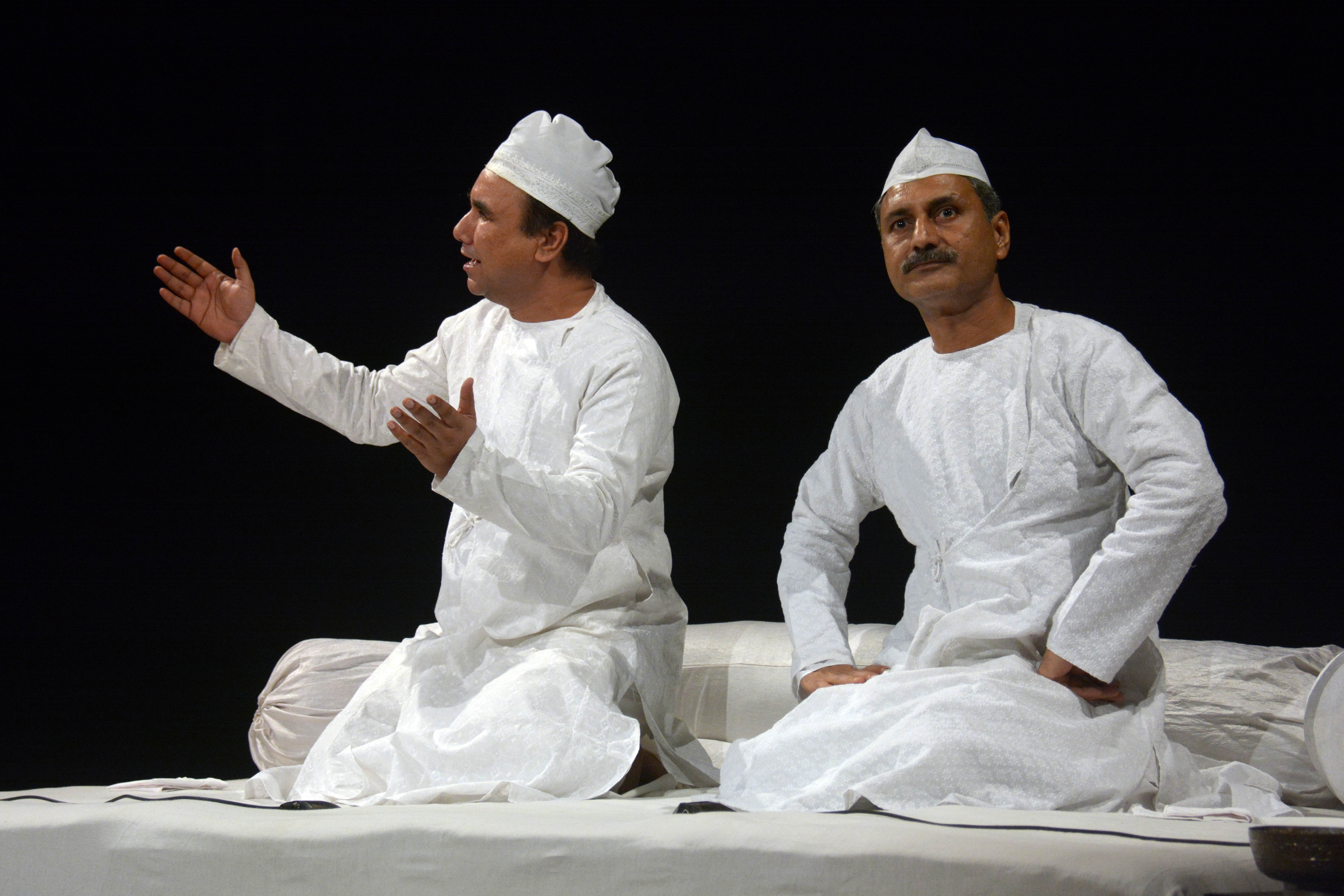
Darain Shahidi and Mahmood Farooqui

Farooqui began reinventing Dastangoi, the 16th-century Urdu oral storytelling art form, in 2005. Since then, he has performed thousands of shows across the world. Apart from bringing alive the old epic of Dastan-e-Amir Hamza, he has innovated Dastangoi by using it as a medium to tell modern tales. Some of his adaptations include:

- A retelling of Vijaydan Detha's Rajasthani folktale, Chouboli;
- An allegorical take on the trial and incarceration of communist activist Dr. Binayak Sen;
- A presentation on the life and times of communist ideologue and novelist Saadat Hasan Manto;
- An adaptation of Lewis Carroll's classics 'Alice's adventures in Wonderland', and 'Through the Looking Glass';
- A collage based on AK Ramanujan's essay, '300 Ramayanas';
- A collage of stories on the partition of India;
- Dastan-e-Karan Az Mahabharata, a retelling of the life of Karna based on Urdu, Persian, Hindi, and Sanskrit sources;
- His latest work, Dastan-e-Guru Dutt (2025), narrates the life and creative struggles of filmmaker Guru Dutt.

Farooqui has, over the years, built a team of dastangos trained by him, including Ankit Chadha, Darain Shahidi, Poonam Girdhani and Himanshu Bajpai.

== Books ==
His publications include the award-winning Besieged: Voices from Delhi,1857, Habib Tanvir: Memoirs, a translation of theatre-director Habib Tanvir's memoirs from Urdu with notes and an introduction, Dastangoi, an introduction to the art of datangoi, and A Requiem for Pakistan: The world of Intizar Husain, a personal exploration of the literary and biographical world of Intizar Husain, brief history of modern Urdu Literary Culture and Daastan-e-Guru Dutt (2025), a companion book to his Dastangoi performance exploring the life of filmmaker Guru Dutt.

== Personal life ==
Farooqui is married to film director and screenwriter Anusha Rizvi, who directed the 2010 Indian satirical comedy film Peepli Live which explores the topic of "farmer suicides". He is a nephew of Urdu poet and literary critic Shamsur Rahman Faruqi.

In 2025, Farooqui co-produced The Great Shamsuddin Family, a Hindi-language comedy-drama written and directed by Anusha Rizvi, alongside Ajit Andhare and Alok Jain. The film, which marked Rizvi's return to direction after Peepli Live (2010), premiered on JioHotstar on 12 December 2025.
