= Chalam =

Chalam may refer to:

- Chalam (actor), an actor in Telugu cinema
- Chalam (writer), a writer
