= Dhavala Satyam =

Indian film director, producer and screenplay writer

Davala Satyam is an Indian film director, producer and screenplay writer. He has worked predominantly in Telugu cinema since the early 1980s.

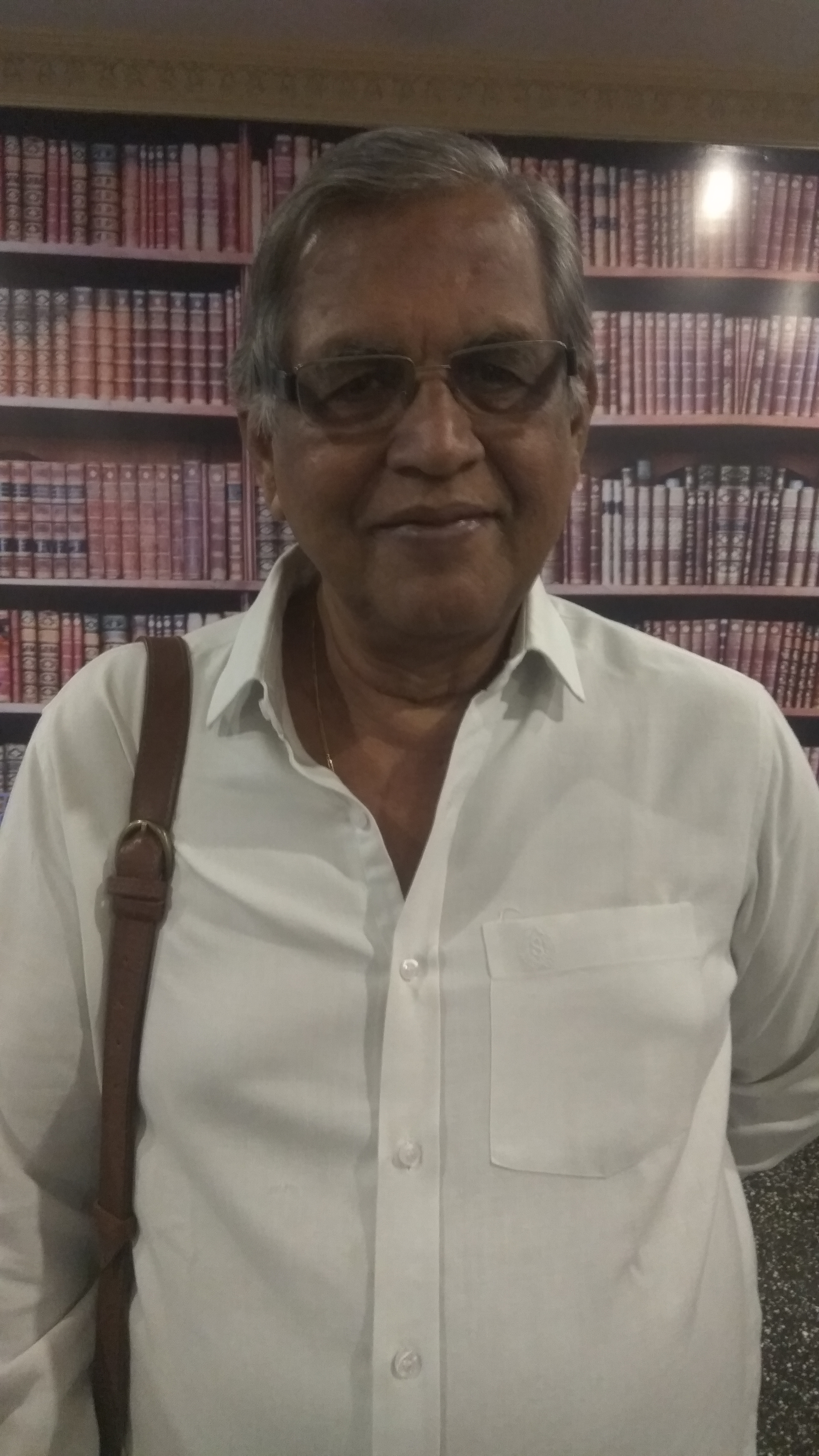
Dhavala Satyam

Satyam is known for his revolutionary movies known as Erra Cinema in Telugu. His film Yuvatharam Kadilindi won a Nandi Award for Best Feature Film from the Government of Andhra Pradesh and M. Prabhakar Reddy won the Nandi Award for Best Actor in 1980.

He associated with film personalities such as Dasari Narayana Rao, Madala Ranga Rao, Chiranjeevi, Murali Mohan and R. Narayana Murthy.

Satyam directed Chaitanya Ratham (1987), a controversial biopic on politician Vangaveeti Mohana Ranga and his brother Vangaveeti Radha despite the political pressures. Both Radha and Ranga were murdered by political opponents, in 1974 and 1988, respectively. The movie prints were destroyed following widespread violence after Ranga's assassination in December 1988.

== Filmography ==
- Yuvatharam Kadilindi (1980)
- Jathara (1980)
- Erra Mallelu (1981)
- Subbaravuki Kopam Vachindi (1982)
- Gudi Gantalu Mrogayi (1984)
- Chaitanya Ratham (1987) (controversial biopic on politician Vangaveeti Mohana Ranga and his brother Vangaveeti Radha)
- Erramatti (1989)
- Mundaithe Oora Habba (2000) (Kannada movie starring Jaggesh) (Directed and produced by Dhavala Satyam)
- Bheemudu (2003)
- Nenu Saitham (2004)
- Lava Kusa: The Warrior Twins (2010) (animation film)
