= Sanga Natham =

- Title card
- Directed by: G. Ramineedu
- Screenplay by: Tha. Pandian
- Story by: Madala Ranga Rao
- Starring: Rajesh; Rajyalakshmi
- Cinematography: G. P. Vidyasagar
- Edited by: Anil Malnad
- Music by: Ilaiyaraaja
- Production company: Janasakthi Creations Pvt. Ltd.
- Release date: 14 April 1984
- Country: India
- Language: Tamil

Sanga Natham (transl. Sound of the shankha) is a 1984 Indian Tamil-language film directed by Ramineedu and produced by Janasakthi Creations. The film stars Rajesh and Rajyalakshmi. It was released on 14 April 1984. The film was a remake of the Telugu film Yuvatharam Kadilindi.

== Cast ==
- Rajesh
- Rajyalakshmi
- Nagesh
- C. R. Vijayakumari
- Vennira Aadai Moorthy
- Senthil
- Nizhalgal Ravi
- Y. Vijaya

== Production ==
The film was launched on 24 October 1983 at Vijaya Gardens with minister K. Kalimuthu switching on the camera while Bharathiraja clapped the first shot. The film marked the debut of Telugu director G. Ramineedu in Tamil cinema. The screenplay and dialogues were written by politician and writer Tha. Pandian. The filming was held at Erode and Tiruppur.

== Soundtrack ==
The music was composed by Ilaiyaraaja.

Song	Singers	Lyrics
Enga Natham	Malaysia Vasudevan	K. C. S. Arunachalam
Ethetho Sonnanga	P. Jayachandran, Vani Jairam, Malaysia Vasudevan	Vairamuthu
Indha Kalyanam	Malaysia Vasudevan, S. Janaki	Vairamuthu
Maanavargale	Malaysia Vasudevan, Krishnamurthi	Vairamuthu
