= The Great Shamsuddin Family =

- Official release poster
- Directed by: Anusha Rizvi
- Written by: Anusha Rizvi
- Produced by: Ajit Andhare; Alok Jain; Mahmood Farooqui
- Starring: Kritika Kamra; Shreya Dhanwanthary; Sheeba Chaddha; Farida Jalal; Purab Kohli
- Cinematography: Remy Dabashis Dalai
- Edited by: Konark Saxena
- Music by: Simran Hora
- Production companies: Star Studio18; Third World Films
- Distributed by: JioHotstar
- Release date: 12 December 2025
- Country: India
- Language: Hindi

The Great Shamsuddin Family is a 2025 Hindi-language comedy drama film written and directed by Anusha Rizvi. It is produced by Ajit Andhare, Alok Jain and Mahmood Farooqui under Star Studio18. It stars an ensemble cast including Kritika Kamra, Shreya Dhanwanthary, Sheeba Chaddha, Farida Jalal and Purab Kohli. It premiered on JioHotstar on 12 December 2025.

== Plot ==
Set over the course of a single day inside a Delhi apartment, the film centers on Bani, a disciplined and ever-reliable writer racing to meet a crucial deadline. Her carefully ordered routine collapses when her scatterbrain cousin, Iram, arrives unexpectedly in a panic. Iram has withdrawn ₹25 lakh from her mother's bank account using a forged signature and handed it to a man she claims is her boyfriend. Shortly, Bani's older sister arrives and reveals she is the forger. As the crisis spirals, Bani is forced to balance an intense 12-hour writing sprint with the escalating family turmoil, navigating a series of emotional and domestic upheavals unraveling inside her small flat.

== Cast ==
- Kritika Kamra as Bani Ahmed
- Shreya Dhanwanthary as Iram Ahmed
- Sheeba Chaddha as Saafiya
- Farida Jalal as Akko
- Purab Kohli as Amitav
- Dolly Ahluwalia as Asiya
- Juhi Babbar as Humaira
- Natasha Rastogi as Nabeela
- Joyeeta Dutta as Latika
- Anushka Banerjee as Pallavi
- Nishank Verma as Zoheb
- Anup Soni as Tauseef (cameo)
- Manisha Gupta as Khushi

== Release ==
The film was released on JioHotstar on 12 December 2025.

== Reception ==
On the review aggregator website Rotten Tomatoes, 90% of 10 critics' reviews are positive, with an average rating of 5.6/10.

Shubhra Gupta of The Indian Express gave 2.5 stars out of 5 and commented that "It isn’t perfect, but it makes you smile and think." Shilajit Mitra of The Hollywood Reporter India called it "Mostly a delight" and wrote that "Great Shamsuddin Family is more sweet than it is subversive. It is a gentle and often delightful watch, its potency largely derived from its performances." Anisha Rao of India Today rated it 2.5/5 stars and said that "The Great Shamsuddin Family isn’t a film that sweeps you away, but it is one that leaves you thinking. It’s messy, warm, uneven, endearing and unexpectedly poignant."

Nandini Ramnath of Scroll.in stated in her review that "The 97-minute movie is set in a Delhi milieu that is rarely explored. Observant but also liberal Muslims intersect with deracinated academics in mostly hilarious and at times uncomfortable ways." Deepa Gahlot of Rediff.com gave 3 stars out of 5 and said that "The Great Shamsuddin Family is a seemingly light chamber piece that hides its claws of social commentary under the chirpy banter of an apartment full of women."

Ronak Kotecha of The Times of India rated it 3/5 stars and observed that "Watch it if you enjoy heartfelt family chaos with relatable humour, this is just good enough not great." A critic from Bollywood Hungama gave it 2.5 stars out of 5 and said that "On the whole, THE GREAT SHAMSUDDIN FAMILY is a decent, intermittently engaging family dramedy that shines in its performances and slice-of-life humour but stumbles due to its uneven writing and convenient, rushed finale. It works in parts rather than as a wholly satisfying film." Arpita Sarkar of OTT Play gave 2 stars out of 5 and pointed out that "Kritika Kamra's talent is wasted in this sloppily fast-paced narrative, where every chaos takes place at the same time, making it hard to tolerate."

Bhawna Arya of Times Now rated it 2.5 stars out of 5 and said that "The Great Shamsuddin Family is a warm, witty slice-of-life film that celebrates the madness and magic of family. It may not be grand or groundbreaking, but it’s undeniably heartfelt, the kind of film that makes you laugh, sigh, and maybe call your own family afterward." Troy Ribeiro of Free Press Journal writes in verdict that "Overall, this culturally rooted entertainer celebrates the madness of big Indian families while acknowledging their burdens. It might not push cinematic boundaries, but it delivers an honest, heartfelt portrait of love wrapped in clutter. It is a perfect pick for viewers who enjoy stories of togetherness, generational tussles, and the bittersweet bonds that make families both impossible and indispensable." Shubhangi Shah of The Week rated it 3/5 stars and said that "The Great Shamsuddin Family isn’t a film that always has it all together, but one that’s engaging and warm. Not to mention, at a time when the film space is all about loud men inflicting violence, this light, chaotic ride truly stands out."

Ashwin S of Cinema Express rated it 3/5 stars and stated that "Anusha Rizvi’s The Great Shamsuddin Family is a topsy-turvy character study that represents the deeper themes of social dynamics in the country." Anuj Kumar of The Hindu pointed out that "Fuelled by an endearing ensemble, writer-director Anusha Rizvi returns with a refreshingly unpretentious portrait of a modern Muslim family grappling with generational gaps and social tensions." Nonika Singh of The Tribune awarded 3.5 stars out of 5 and said that "At once delightful and incisive, Anusha Rizvi's film knocks more than one pigeonhole we all have begun to inhabit."

== Thematic analysis ==
The film drew positive responses from professors, journalists, and public intellectuals for presenting the Muslim community in India in a nuanced, everyday manner, avoiding stereotypical and biased portrayals.

Khalid Mohammed in The Quint praised the film and commented that "In most films today, minorities are treated as expendable, appearing only as sidebar accessories. Not here." Apoorvanand writing for the Frontline observed that "The film captures with great subtlety the uncertainty that has seeped into the everyday lives of Indian Muslims. This uncertainty is not of their own making. It has lodged within them a particular kind of unease—one that is often difficult for non-Muslims, especially Hindus, to comprehend. Muslims have grown accustomed to living with it. Yet it has not extinguished their desire for life."

Ravish Kumar writes in The Wire that "Although the characters in The Great Shamsuddin Family have Muslim identities, their behaviour and surroundings subtly reflect the pressures and influences of a Hindu majoritarian nation-state. These ideological traces are never explicitly shown, yet they are strongly sensed throughout the film a restraint that underscores Anusha Rizvi’s cinematic brilliance. Suhani Singh writes in India Today that "In between all the family banter and drama, writer-director Anusha Rizvi subtly weaves in the larger anxieties and insecurities of being a Muslim in today's India."

Pranavi Sharma writing for Hindustan Times noted that "no one explains themselves to an invisible majority audience or tries to prove anything." Rajeev Srivastava writes in his opinion piece in News18.com that "Anusha Rizvi emerges as a distinctive voice in contemporary Indian cinema, crafting stories that are intimate, humane, humorous, and sharply real. The Great Shamsuddin Family blends farce with truth, offering a tender and witty portrait of a chaotic household brimming with life and interruptions."

== Accolades ==
Award	Date of ceremony	Category	Recipient(s)	Result	Ref.
Indian Film Festival of Melbourne	13–23 August 2026	Best Film – Special Mention	The Great Shamsuddin Family	Won	
