= Nenu Saitham =

- Directed by: Dhavala Satyam
- Written by: M V S Haranadha Rao
- Produced by: Madala Ravi
- Starring: Madala Ravi; Gurleen Chopra
- Music by: TVS Raju
- Production company: Bharat Productions
- Release date: 18 June 2004
- Country: India
- Language: Telugu

Nenu Saitham (transl. Me too) is a 2004 Indian Telugu-language drama film directed by Dhavala Satyam and starring Madala Ravi and Gurleen Chopra.

== Cast ==
- Madala Ravi
- Gurleen Chopra
- Madala Ranga Rao
- Jayaprakash Reddy as Minister
- Chandra Mohan
- Telangana Shakuntala
- Jeeva
- Pragathi
- Narra Venkateswara Rao

== Production ==
The film's title is based on a lyric by Sri Sri. Dhavala Satyam chose Madala Ravi, Madala Ranga Rao's doctor son, since he looked like a common man to make his lead acting debut. Satyam and Ranga Rao had previously worked together for Erra Mallelu (1981) in which Ravi had made a special appearance.

== Soundtrack ==
Nenu Saitham

Film score by TVS Raju
- Released: 2004
- Genre: Soundtrack
- Length: 34:39
- Label: Lahari Music
External audio
- Nenu Saitham – Jukebox on YouTube

The soundtrack was composed by TVS Raju. Music acquired by Lahari Music Company.

No.	Title	Lyrics	Singer(s)	Length
1.	"Hyderabad Sale"	Suddala Ashok Teja	S. P. Balasubrahmanyam	4:56
2.	"Naadiridinnare"	Y. S. Krishneshwara Rao	S. P. Charan, Kousalya	4:54
3.	"Ashdham Kaadu"	Y.S. Krishneshwara Rao	Nishma	3:50
4.	"Ekkadikani Pothunnaru"	Y.S. Krishneshwara Rao	S. P. Balasubrahmanyam	5:29
5.	"Aha Jabardasthu"	Y.S. Krishneshwara Rao	Mano	4:32
6.	"Vedana Enduku"	Adrushta Deepak	Mano	4:46
7.	"Vedan Enduku"	Y. S. Krishneshwara Rao	Mano	6:12
Total length:				34:39

== Reception ==
A critic from IANS rated the film 2 1/2 out of 5 and called the plot unique.
