= Gollapudi Srinivas Award =

Annual film award

Gollapudi Srinivas Award is a national-level private award given to a first-time director in Indian Cinema every year. It is given out in the memory of Gollapudi Srinivas (3 March 1966 – 12 August 1992). He was the youngest son of veteran Telugu film personality Gollapudi Maruthi Rao. This award was first announced in 1997 at Chennai.

== Gollapudi Srinivas Memorial Foundation ==
While directing his début Telugu film Prema Pustakam, Gollapudi Srinivas succumbed to a water accident on August 12, 1992. The Telugu film industry lost a promising director. The Maruthi Rao family established the Gollapudi Srinivas Memorial Foundation to perpetuate the memory and instituted an annual cash award for the Best Début Director chosen from among Indian-language films. As part of the event, an eminent Indian film personality gives the keynote lecture.

== Awards ==
| Year | Recipient | Film (language) | Keynote speaker (topic) |
|---|---|---|---|
| 1998 | Leslie Carvalho | The Outhouse (English) | Sunil Dutt ("My Experiments on Celluloid") |
| 1999 | Shyamaprasad | Agni Sakshi (Malayalam) | Mrinal Sen ("Cinema and Social Values") |
| 2000 | Manju Borah | Baibhab (Assamese) | M.T. Vasudevan Nair ("Literature and Cinema") |
| 2001 | Subrata Sen | Ek Je Ache Kanya (Bengali) | U. R. Ananthamurthy ("Moral Fatigue in Indian Cinema") |
| 2002 | Janaki Vishwanathan | Kutty (Tamil) | Shyam Benegal ("Secularism in Indian Cinema") |
| 2003 | Ram Madhvani | Let's Talk (English) | Javed Akhtar ("Poetry and Cinema") |
| 2004 | Anup Kurian | Manasarovar (English) | Naseeruddin Shah ("The Relationship Between Theatre and Cinema") |
| 2005 | Shonali Bose | Amu (English) | Buddhadeb Dasgupta ("The Dialectics Of Judging A Cinema") |
| 2006 | Indraganti Mohan Krishna | Grahanam (Telugu) | Gautam Ghose ("Collective Memories & Timelessness in Cinema") |
| 2007 | Rajnesh Domalpalli | Vanaja (Telugu) | Amol Palekar ("Regional Cinema: Beyond Bollywood") |
| 2008 | Aamir Khan | Taare Zameen Par (Hindi) | K. Balachander ("On Aamir Khan") and Anupam Kher ("Children of a Bigger God") |
| 2009 | Paresh Mokashi | Harishchandrachi Factory (Marathi) | Resul Pookutty ("Audiography in Indian Motion Picture") |
| 2010 | Amit Rai | Road to Sangam (Hindi) | Girish Karnad ("Religion & Mythology") |
| 2011 | Anusha Rizvi | Peepli Live (Hindi) | Girish Kasaravalli ("Time as a Construct in Contemporary Cinema") |
| 2012 | Madhav Ramadasan | Melvilasom (Malayalam) | Rishi Kapoor ("The Journey from Prithviraj Kapoor to Ranbir Kapoor") |
| 2013 | Kamal K. M. | I.D. (Hindi) | Balu Mahendra |
| 2014 | Gyan Correa | The Good Road (Gujarati) | Chetan Bhagat ("Entertainment for Change") |
| 2015 | Sanjeev Gupta | Q (Hindi) | - |
| 2016 | Jayaprakash Radhakrishnan | Lens (English) | - |
| 2017 | Hemanth Rao | Godhi Banna Sadharana Mykattu (Kannada) | - |
| 2018 | Konkona Sen Sharma | A Death in the Gunj (English) | - |
| 2019 | C. Prem Kumar | 96 (Tamil) | - |
| 2020 | Madhu C Narayanan | Kumbalangi Nights (Malayalam) | |
