= Grahanam =

- Directed by: Indraganti Mohan Krishna
- Written by: Indraganti Mohan Krishna
- Based on: Dosha Gunam by Chalam
- Produced by: B. V. Subba Rao; N. Anji Reddy; P. Venkateswara Rao
- Starring: Thallavajhula Mohnish; Tanikella Bharani; Surya; Jayalalitha
- Cinematography: P. G. Vinda
- Edited by: Lokesh
- Music by: K. Vijay
- Release date: 2004
- Country: India
- Language: Telugu

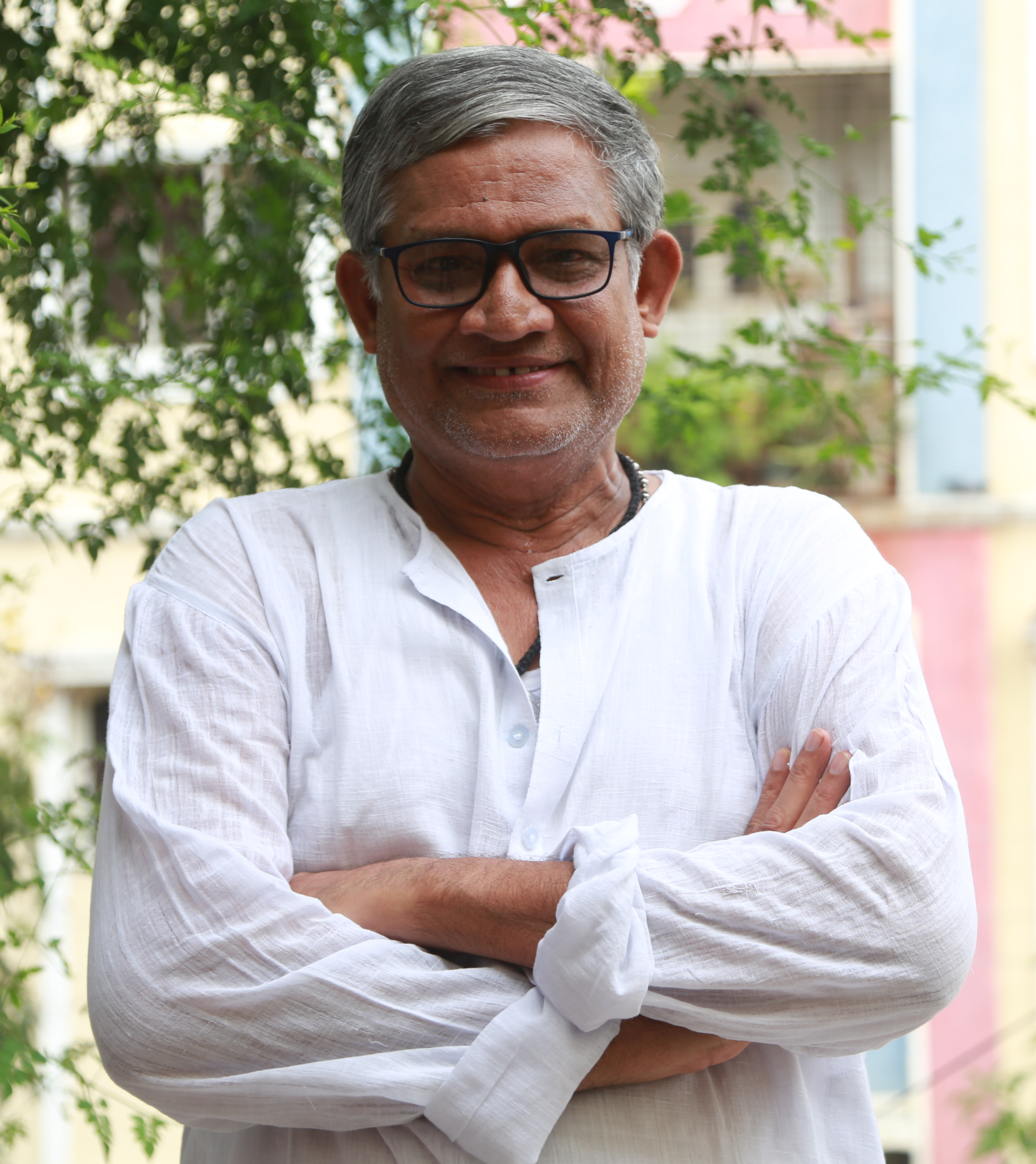
Tanikella Bharani, actor

Grahanam (transl. Eclipse) is a 2004 Indian Telugu-language film directed by Indraganti Mohan Krishna. It is based on Dosha Gunam, a story written by Chalam. The film won critical acclaim upon release and received the National Film Award for Best Debut Film of a Director. The film premiered at the 36th International Film Festival of India, the 2004 Seattle First Independent South Asian Film Festival and the 2004 Mumbai Asian Film Festival. The film won two Nandi Awards.

== Plot ==
Dr. Raghavram is a practicing physician in a small village. Another doctor and a nurse work along with him at the clinic. One day when he is on his rounds, he comes upon a quarrel between a patient and his mother. The patient expresses disgust and claims to have no relationship with his mother. The patient's mother leaves in tears and Dr.Raghavram follows her to tell her that her son is now OK. When he asks her for her name and where she came from, she walks away without answering his questions. The doctor is intrigued and delves into the details of the patient and finds out the patient's name is Vasudeva.

After work, the doctor tell his friends that the old woman was from his village. He proceeds to narrate a story from the days of his youth. When the Doctor was merely a young boy he lived in a small village. In that small village lived a wealthy family, Narayana Swamy, his wife Sardamba and their young son, Vasudeva. They were a kind and generous couple who contributed to the welfare of the community. Saradamba, in particular, was regarded as pious, religious, generous and also very beautiful. She would sponsor mid-day meals for students. Among the students is a boy called Kanakayya, who was also a very good student. Saradamba is very fond of Kanakayya and showers him with love and affection. Kanakayya too is very fond of Saradamaba and does errands around the house for Saradamba, such as massaging her feet and plucking mangoes from the garden.

One day Kanakayya has a high fever that refuses to break. The village physician, Sri Hari, claims it is a stubborn viral fever and gives him medicine but there seems to be no relief. Kanakkaya's fever increases and he mutters "Saradamba" over and over in a delirious state. Kanakayya's family brings in a doctor, Gopayya, who practices alternate medicine. Gopayya claims that its "Doshagunam", an STD that young men get from having sex with older women. The treatment for Doshagunam is to apply the blood extracted from the thigh of the older woman into the eyes of the young man. Kanakayya's family struggles with this information and word gets out. Narayana Swamy comes to hear of this and starts to suspect his wife. Saradamba too hears of this from Kanakayya's mother and becomes furious. Later, when Narayana Swamy brings this up with his wife it results in a huge quarrel.

Kanakayya gets even worse and Gopayya claims there is no more time to lose. Kanakayya's father approaches Narayana Swamy for Saradamba's blood. Fearing the boy's death might result in greater scandal, Narayana Swamy extracts the blood from Saradamba forcefully. Sometime after Gopayya administers the blood to Kanakayya, the boy recovers from the grips of the viral fever. Narayana Swamy, upon hearing that Kanakaya is now better, accuses his wife of infidelity and makes her leave the village. Kanakkaya learns of what happened when he recovers but no one is willing to listen to him.

The doctor asks his friend about his take on the story. The friend replies that there is no way to tell what actually happened but one must take into consideration that Kanakayya did recover. Perhaps there was an illicit relationship between Kanakkaya and Saradamba. The Doctor counters by saying that it might have merely been a coincidence that Kanakkaya's fever broke after the application of blood. The friend replies that there is no way to conclude this and that the nature of the relationship is known only to two people: Kanakkaya and Saradamaba.

At this point, the doctor reveals that he is Kanakkaya and that there was no illicit relation between him and Saradamba. He moved out of his house, went to Madras to become a Doctor and changed his name. The next day the Doctor goes back to the hospital to find the patient in a critical state and saves his life. He goes out to the place where he saw the old woman in the hope she will return.

"Unless you believe in some principles to be true, there can be no peace. The intellect of all those who say "this is all we know, this is what there is" is weak and fatigued. Perhaps there is another explanation, another truth, perhaps we don't know it yet!" - Chalam

== Cast ==
- Thallavajhula Mohnish as Kanakayya
- Tanikella Bharani as Narayana Swamy
- Jayalalitha as Saradamba
- Surya as Dr. Raghav
- Thallavajhula Sundaram as Gopayya
- Kamal as Srinivas
- Goparaju Ramana as Subramanyam
- Sivannarayana
- Jyoti as Lakshmi
- Thallavajhula Sundaram as village doctor
- Rachakonda Vidya Sagar as Sri Hari

== Awards ==
National Film Awards - 2004

- Indira Gandhi Award for Best Debut Film of a Director - Indraganti Mohan Krishna

Nandi Awards - 2004

- Best First Film of a Director - Indraganti Mohan Krishna
- Third Best Feature Film - Bronze - Subba Rao, Anji Reddy & P. Venkateswara Rao

Other awards

- Gollapudi Srinivas Award - Indraganti Mohan Krishna - 2006
