= Oka Pellam Muddu Rendo Pellam Vaddu =

2004 film

- Directed by: Kongarapi Venkata Ramana
- Written by: Marudhuri Raja (dialogues)
- Screenplay by: Kongarapi Venkata Ramana
- Story by: Kongarapi Venkata Ramana
- Produced by: Dammalapati Srinivasa Rao
- Starring: Rajendra Prasad; Raasi; Gurleen Chopra
- Cinematography: Sarath
- Edited by: V. Nagi Reddy
- Music by: Vandemataram Srinivas
- Production company: Sai Krishna Productions
- Release date: 28 April 2004
- Running time: 143 mins
- Country: India
- Language: Telugu

Oka Pellam Muddu Rendo Pellam Vaddu (transl. One wife is enough, don't have a second one) is 2004 Telugu-language comedy film produced by Dammalapati Srinivasa Rao on Sai Krishna Productions banner and directed by Kongarapi Venkata Ramana. It stars Rajendra Prasad, Raasi, Gurleen Chopra with music composed by Vandemataram Srinivas. The film was recorded as a flop at the box office.

== Cast ==
- Rajendra Prasad as Hari Chandra
- Raasi as Satya
- Gurleen Chopra as Meena
- Brahmanandam as Lakshmikanth
- Sunil as Pyarelal
- Tanikella Bharani as Sarvarayudu
- Venu Madhav as Auto Guravaiah
- Krishna Bhagawan as Krishna
- Surya as Sarath
- Rama Prabha as Meena's grandmother
- Jayalalita as Sarala
- Radhika Chowdary
- Junior Relangi
- Jeeva as Manik Dada RMP
- Jenny

== Soundtrack ==
Oka Pellam Muddu Rendo Pellam Vaddu

Film score by Vandemataram Srinivas
- Released: 2004
- Genre: Soundtrack
- Length: 22:48
- Label: Supreme Music
- Producer: Vandemataram Srinivas

Vandemataram Srinivas chronology
Rowdy Aliya (2004)	Oka Pellam Muddu Rendo Pellam Vaddu (2004)	Sankharavam (2004)

Music was composed by Vandemataram Srinivas. Music was released on Supreme Music Company.

No.	Title	Lyrics	Singer(s)	Length
1.	"Nee Vayasu Thakhuva"	Paidisheety Ram	Udit Narayan, Kousalya	4:40
2.	"Govinda Govinda"	Taidalabapu	Ravi Varma, Kousalya	4:45
3.	"Iruvuri Bharyala"	Jaya Surya	Shankar Mahadevan, Usha	4:40
4.	"Adadaniki Aasthulante"	Taidalabapu	Ravi Varma	4:37
5.	"Naa Trunku Pettae"	Paidisheety Ram	Malathi	4:06
Total length:				22:48
