= Ankit Chadha =

Indian writer

- Born: 21 December 1987; New Delhi
- Died: 9 May 2018 (aged 30); Pune, Maharastra, India
- Education: Hindu College
- Occupations: Author and storyteller
- Website: www.ankitchadha.in

Ankit Chadha (21 December 1987 – 9 May 2018) was an Indian writer, story-teller, oral narrative performance artist, researcher and educator. He specialized in research-based narratives performed in the centuries-old Dastangoi form of storytelling. His writing varied from biographical accounts of personalities like Kabir and Abdul Rahim Khan-I-Khana to Dara Shikoh and Majaz. He had spoken on Dastangoi globally, including at Harvard, Yale and University of Toronto.

Ankit had worked with non-profits to weave modern tales on sustainability, technology and hunger. Additionally, Ankit had innovated the form of 'Musical Dastan','uniquely bringing together stories and music. Ankit had also worked on Dastangoi performances for children, adapting classics including Alice, The Phantom Tollbooth, and The Little Prince. He was the author of the award-winning books "Amir Khusrau - The Man in Riddles" and “My Gandhi Story”.

His latest book, “Toh Hazireen Hua Yun.. Dastan-e-Ankit Chadha”, tells Ankit's story through his work. It is a collection of 16 Dastans written and performed by him over the last seven years. The book includes 'Praarthanaa,' a musical dastan that is based on Ankit's years of continuing research on the Collected Works of Mahatma Gandhi. Undeniably, this dastan was very close to Ankit's heart and was the last dastan completed and performed by him.

== Early life and education ==
Ankit was born in New Delhi to a middle-class family. He did his schooling from Tagore International School and Cambridge School. He went on to pursue his love for History at Hindu College, Delhi University. This is where he also pursued his other love for dramatics. He was the president at Ibtida, the dramatics society of Hindu College.

== Career ==
Ankit spent 4 years (2008 – 2012) working in the corporate world in the digital marketing space before he found his calling for Storytelling.

Under the mentorship of Mahmood Farooqui, he learnt the art of Urdu storytelling known as dastangoi, an oral form that revolves around the dastango or storyteller, using their voice to conjure up an elaborate cast of characters, transporting audiences to distant worlds and making them think about their own immediate reality. In 2012, he also delivered a talk at TEDx on Dastangoi.

After studying under his ustaad, Ankit began to experiment with the form to create new stories; he also collaborated with singers, scholars, and storytellers.

He experimented with scripting on contemporary themes like mobile ecosystem, corporate culture, digital divide and nomadic pastoralism in dastangoi. He performed at major festivals in India including Old World Theatre Fest (Delhi), Repertwahr Fest (Lucknow), Sunday to Sunday Theatre Fest (Ahmedabad), and Kabir Fest (Mumbai). He was also a speaker/performer on Children's literature at the Jaipur Litfest; Bookaroo, Srinagar; Kahaani Festival.

While Ankit received tremendous media attention for his capacity to hold audiences spellbound, his work as a peace educator merits more visibility. In 2013, he was selected by Seeds of Peace, a peace building and leadership development organisation in the US, to participate in a two-week programme for educators called ‘Making History’. His association with the organisation deepened further, and he was part of a follow-up programme in Jordan. On that trip, he also visited Jerusalem, and came back with stories that had seeped under his skin. He was later awarded the New Visions for Peace Fellowship, which took him to Cyprus. Ankit was in the process of developing Project Agora, which would explore how history can be taught through creative means that encourage critical thinking.

== Performances ==
- Praarthanaa - a musical dastan celebrating 'Death' in the life and thought of Gandhi
- Dastan Dhai Aakhar Ki - a dastangoi presentation on Kabir
- Dastan-e-Khanabadosh - a dastangoi presentation about nomadic pastoralists
- Dastan Khusrav-e-Shireen Sukhan Ki
- Dastan-e-Amir Hamza
- Dastan Tollbooth Ki
- Dastan Dara Shikoh Ki
- Dastan Khan-e-Khanan Ki - with Himanshu Bajpai
- Dastan Urdu Mahathagni Ki
- Dastan-e-Aawaargi - with Himanshu Bajpai
- Dastan Fox Aur Dog Ki - a dastangoi presentation on Digital India
- Dastan Bhookh Ki
- Kissa Cheenti Ka
- Dastan Jaal Ke Khel Ki Aur Khel Ke Jaal Ki - a dastangoi presentation on Mobile technology
- Durga Saptashati
- Dastan-e-sedition - presented along with Himanshu Bajpai during the 2016 student protests at Jawaharlal Nehru University, New Delhi.
- Dastan Alice ki - Alice's Adventures in Wonderland by Lewis Carroll, adopted in dastangoi form

== Publications ==
- Toh Hazireen Hua Yun... Dastan-e-Ankit Chadha - A collection of dastans woven by Ankit Chadha
- Amir Khusrau : The Man in Riddles - The Riddles of Amir Khusrau adapted for children
- My Gandhi Story

== Other projects ==
- Teaching CCC Electives Course on Storytelling at MICA
- History Educator at Seeds of Peace: Ankit was invited by Seeds of Peace, US-based not-for-profit as one of the 2 representatives from India among 8 countries to address key questions that are at the heart of education for a more peaceful future. Given the central role that the construction and teaching of history plays in conflict settings, this program focuses on the topic of “Making History.”
- Consultant to Aga Khan Foundation: Ankit wrote and performed Dastan Khusrav-e-Shireen Sukhan Ki, a dastangoi presentation on the life, times and works of the phenomenon called Amir Khusrau. He devised, scripted and performed a musical narrative exploring the relationship between Amir Khusrau, the 13th century Sufi poet from India, and his spiritual master Nizamuddin Auliya. He also edited scholarly papers on various topics written by academics around the world on Amir Khusrau, and translated qawwali kalaams from Urdu to English.
- Visiting Fellow at Jadavpur University: Ankit conducted workshop with students (of undergraduate till M.Phil) from Departments of Comparative Literature and English, Jadavpur University, to understand the art of Dastangoi (from concept to delivery) and experience how working on a Dastan around a poet enriches one's enjoyment of his/her poetry.
- New Visions of Peace Fellowship: As an artist with an educational mission, Ankit worked on a project to build a more peaceful future in communities affected by conflict, by encouraging cross-cultural understanding.
- Story Development for Animation Film on Bhil Art: We Make Images is an animated interpretation of an origin myth from the Bhil community in Madhya Pradesh, India. For the Bhil community, painting is like offering a prayer and the film reveals why. The film is a collaboration between the indigenous artist Sher Singh from the community and the film maker Nina Sabnani that explores ways of telling together.
- Story on the Markets of Lucknow: The project was for the Mahindra Sanatkada Festival 2013, with its theme as "Lucknow Ke Bazaaron Mein Chahal Qadami". A customized narrative was woven to acquaint the audience with all the 56 shops set up in the Safed Baradari to recreate the 18th century bazaar. The research, compilation, and writing for the piece was done in collaboration with Mahmood Farooqui.
- Workshops for State Council of Educational Research and Training (SCERT): Ankit trained teachers in the incorporation of storytelling as a technique in daily classroom learning. Some of the objectives were improving reading ability, and integrating curriculum with stories.
- "Tum Chalo" Promo for NH7 Weekender: The project involved writing the script for the official trailer of the India's leading music festival.

== Awards and honours ==
- Sep 2017: 37th FIP Award for Excellence in Book Production for "Amir Khusrau: The Man in Riddles"
- Apr 2017: Inaugural Sabarmati Fellowship by Sabarmati Ashram Preservation and Memorial Trust
- 2016: Children's Choice Award 2016 for “My Gandhi Story”, by Young India Books
- Feb 2014: Darsana National Award For Excellence in Book Production for "My Gandhi Story"
- Nov 2013: Best Script and Best Overall Production for “Dastan Ek Chhoti Si Cheenti Ki”, by Short and Sweet Theatre Festival 2013
- July 2012: Best Live Tweeting for the Event for the best quality coverage on Twitter, by Digital Empowerment Foundation
- Jan 2012: Nominated for India Digital Award for Best Social Media Marketing Campaign and Best Digital Integrated Campaign, by Internet And Mobile Association of India

== Death ==
He drowned in a lake near Pune, Maharashtra on May 9, 2018.

As mentioned in a statement released by the Kabir Festival Mumbai, “Ankit was out for a walk near Kamshet lake, outside Pune, when he and his friend slipped and fell into the water. His friend managed to get to safety and scream for help, bringing local villagers to the spot. Since it was past sunset, it was difficult to locate him in the dark water. When they did manage to retrieve him two hours later, it was too late.”
