= Mohana Krishna Indraganti =

Indian film director

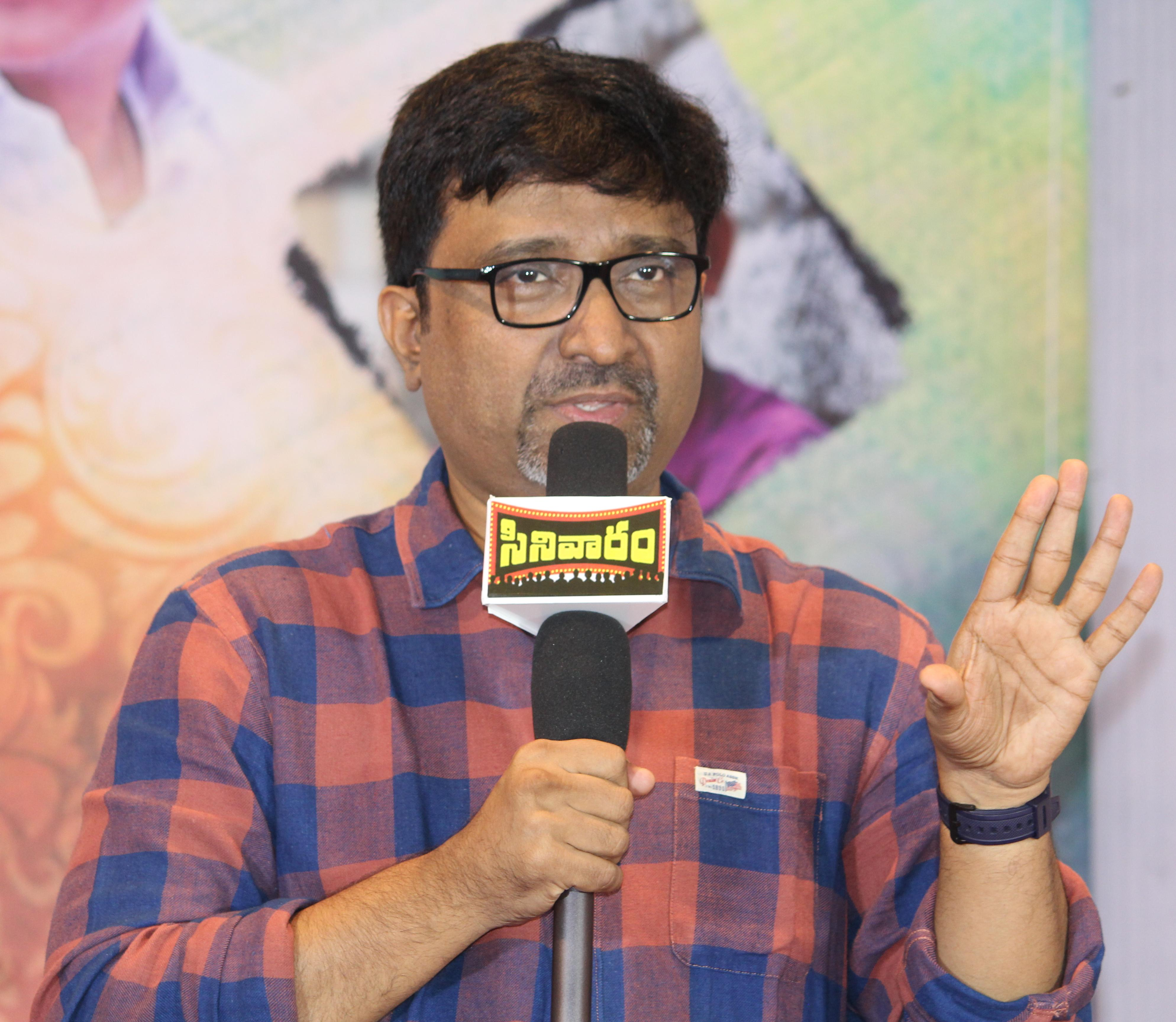
- Indraganti at Cinivaram in 2018
- Born: Tanuku, Andhra Pradesh, India
- Education: University of Hyderabad; York University Andhra Loyola College, Vijayawada
- Occupations: Film director, screenwriter
- Father: Indraganti Srikanth
- Awards: National Film Award; Nandi Award

Mohana Krishna Indraganti is an Indian director known for his works predominantly in Telugu cinema. His debut directorial venture Grahanam (2005) fetched him eleven awards including the National Film Award for Best First Film of a Director, the Nandi Award for Best First Film of a Director and the Gollapudi Srinivas Award for Best First Film of a Director. The film was also showcased in the Indian panorama section of the 2005 International Film Festival of India. He holds a Master of Fine Arts degree from York University.

== Early life ==
Indraganti Mohana Krishna was born into a Telugu Brahmin family in Tanuku, West Godavari district, Andhra Pradesh, India. As his parents, Indraganti Srikanth Sharma and Janaki Bala, and grandparents were writers, he had a fascination towards fiction since his childhood. His grandmother's stories were visually detailed in their narration. In addition to this, he has been an avid reader of literary works and also loved to discuss films with his uncle. In an interview, he said that these were the key reasons that contributed to his interest in filmmaking.

His upbringing was in Vijayawada where he completed his schooling and obtained his bachelor's degree in arts from Loyola College. Thereafter, he pursued his interest in Arts by obtaining a master's degree in English language and Philosophy from University of Hyderabad. He applied to enroll in one of the courses at the Pune-based Film and Television Institute of India; however, his application was rejected. In the meanwhile, he was the writer and associate director for Mahandhra, a socio-cultural, economic and political study of the erstwhile state of Andhra. This study, made in a documentary-drama format for Doordarshan, was performed in commemoration of India's 50th year of independence. He sent creative samples from this study to Toronto-based York University and its prestigious Department of Film in the Faculty of Fine Arts. This helped him join and complete Master of Fine Arts in Film between 1998 and 2000. Even though he registered to continue for his Doctoral degree in Communication and Culture, he discontinued it after a year and returned to Hyderabad in 2001.

=== Foray into films ===
Earlier into films he want to make a short film because to know how much he was ready to make a film. Then he made a horror short film called 'Chali' with the minimum resources he had and with the help of his elder sister (In those days it was tough to make a short film mainly unknown to people). It was praised by writer, actor Tanikella Bharani later who became his mentor in films recommended to director Ram Gopal Varma as an Associate to him after watching his short film Varma instead of offering an Associate he offered to direct his film called 'Madhyanam Hathya'. Later at the finishing stage they both got creative differences and he left the film later Varma remade the film again under his direction.

Later he made his first feature film Grahanam though it was first drafted in 1997, his amateurish skills in constructing the screenplay didn't help much at that time. This draft was based on Doshagunam, a short story written by Gudipati Venkatachalam (popularly known as Chalam), a controversial yesteryear Telugu writer and philosopher. Since screenplay writing was his specialisation in his Master of Fine Arts course at York University, he reworked the script by the time he returned to Hyderabad.

To bring this script to cinema, he approached several producers to help him finance it. Even though all of them were fascinated by his story, they were hesitant about its commercial viability. After three years of futile search and despair, Indraganti decided to produce the film with his own money. Chalam's daughter gave him permission to make a film from one of her father's literary works. When Bharani was also joined in the film with a promising role and a request for enacting without any compensation, he agreed to do so. Out of goodwill, he introduced Indraganti to one of his producer friends who agreed to produce the movie. His debut film fetched him 11 awards with the prominent ones being the National Film Award, Nandi Award bestowed by Government of Andhra Pradesh and Gollapudi Srinivas Memorial Award.

In 2006, his second directorial venture, Mayabazaar, featured Bhumika Chawla and Raja in the lead roles. His next film, Ashta Chamma, which featured Colours Swathi, Nani, Srinivas Avasarala and Bhargavi, was released in 2008 and was a huge success at box office. His later films, Golkonda High School and Anthaka Mundhu Aa Tharuvatha, did well at box office.

== Filmography ==
Year	Film	Notes	Ref.
2004	Grahanam	International Film Festival of India	
2006	Mayabazar		
2008	Ashta Chamma	Based on Oscar Wilde's "The Importance of Being Earnest"	
2011	Golconda High School		
2013	Anthaka Mundu Aa Tarvatha		
2014	Bandipotu		
2016	Gentleman		
2017	Ami Thumi		
2018	Sammohanam		
2020	V		
2022	Aa Ammayi Gurinchi Meeku Cheppali		
2025	Sarangapani Jathakam	Based on Oscar Wilde's "Lord Arthur Saville's Murder"	

As a voice actor

- Mithunam (2012)

=== Frequent collaborators ===
Collaborator	Grahanam; (2004)	Mayabazar; (2006)	Ashta Chamma; (2008)	Golconda High School; (2011)	Anthaka Mundu Aa Tarvatha; (2013)	Bandipotu; (2014)	Gentleman; (2016)	Ami Thumi; (2017)	Sammohanam; (2018)	V; (2020)	Aa Ammayi Gurinchi Meeku Cheppali; (2022)	Sarangapani Jathakam; (2025)
P. G. Vinda	Yes		Yes		Yes	Yes	Yes	Yes	Yes	Yes	Yes	Yes
Marthand K. Venkatesh			Yes		Yes		Yes	Yes	Yes	Yes	Yes	Yes
Kalyani Malik			Yes	Yes	Yes	Yes						
Vivek Sagar									Yes		Yes	Yes
Tanikella Bharani	Yes	Yes	Yes	Yes		Yes	Yes	Yes	Yes	Yes		Yes
Srinivas Avasarala			Yes	Yes (as dialogue writer)	Yes	Yes	Yes	Yes	Yes		Yes	Yes
Nani			Yes				Yes			Yes		
Sudheer Babu									Yes	Yes	Yes	
Eesha Rebba					Yes	Yes		Yes				
Vennela Kishore							Yes	Yes		Yes	Yes	Yes
Naresh									Yes	Yes		Yes
Rohini					Yes		Yes			Yes		
Rahul Ramakrishna									Yes	Yes	Yes	
Jhansi			Yes	Yes	Yes							
Goparaju Ramana	Yes	Yes	Yes	Yes								
Madhumani			Yes	Yes				Yes				

== Discography ==
Year	Films	Songs	Composer	Lyricist	Notes	Ref
2023	Phalana Abbayi Phalana Ammayi	Neeli Meghamalavo	Kalyani Malik	G.K.Murthy	Neeli Meghamalavo song remix originally composed by Rajan-Nagendra	

== Awards ==
National Film Award

- Indira Gandhi Award for Best Debut Film of a Director – Grahanam (2005)

Nandi Awards

- Nandi Award for Best First Film of a Director – Grahanam – 2005
- Nandi Award for Best Story Writer – Anthaka Mundu Aa Tarvatha – 2013

Other Awards

- Gollapudi Srinivas Award – for Best First Film of a Director – 2005 – Grahanam – 2005
- Akkineni Award for Best Home-viewing Feature Film (director) – Ashta Chamma – 2008
