= Goparaju Ramana =

Indian actor

- Born: Goparaju Yagneswara Venkata Ramana Murthy; 5 April 1952 (age 74); Kolakaluru, Andhra Pradesh, India
- Occupation: Actor
- Years active: 1999–present
- Spouse: Leela Annapurna Visalakshi
- Children: 1 (Goparaju Vijay)

Goparaju Yagneswara Venkata Ramana Murthy (born 5 April 1952), known popularly as Goparaju Ramana, is an Indian actor who works in Telugu cinema, theatre and television shows. He made his feature film debut with Grahanam (2004), and had his breakthrough with Middle Class Melodies (2020). Prior to working in films, he appeared in many theatre plays.

== Early and personal life ==
Ramana was born on 5 April 1952 to Hanumantha Rao and Bala Tripurasundaramma in Kolakaluru village of Tenali, Guntur, Andhra Pradesh, India.

He married Leela Annapurna Visalakshi. They have one son, Goparaju Vijay, who is also an actor.

== Career ==
Ramana started his career as actor in theatre. His first appearance was in the play Manavuni Adugujadallo, written by Avula Sambasiva Rao, during his high school. In 1967, he joined the theater company Balanandam where he acted in plays like Sakkubai, Strike and Polish Bhayya. During the same period, he also participated in several programs on All India Radio.

He then started working in television shows, with notable ones being Padmavyuham, Muddha Mandaram and Mahalakshmi. In 2001, Ramana made his feature film debut with Maa Aayana Sundarayya before appearing in Grahanam (2004), directed by Mohana Krishna Indraganti. He got breakthrough for playing the role of Kondalrao in the film Middle Class Melodies (2020), premiered on Amazon Prime Video. Hemanth Kumar of Firstpost, in his review about the film, particularly praised Ramana's performance. The same was echoed by other critics including those from The Hindu and The News Minute. He later appeared in numerous notable films like Ashoka Vanamlo Arjuna Kalyanam (2022), Bedurulanka 2012 (2023) and Ambajipeta Marriage Band (2024).

== Filmography ==
Year	Title	Role	Notes	Ref.
2001	Maa Aayana Sundarayya	Property Registrar		
2004	Grahanam	Subramaniam		
2005	Devi Abhayam			
2006	Maya Bazar	Narada in disguise		
2006	Sundaraaniki Tondarekkuva			
2008	Ashta Chamma	Rambabu's adoptive father		
2010	Betting Bangaraju			
2011	Golconda High School	Liaquat Bhai		
2012	Onamalu			
2014	Mapalle Repallanta			
2016	Veelaite Premiddam			
2017	Gautamiputra Satakarni	Priest		
2017	Nakshatram			
2019	NTR: Mahanayakudu	Government employee		
2020	Middle Class Melodies	Kondalrao		
2021	Krack	P.C. Murthy		
2021	Maha Samudram	Lakshmipathi		
2022	Gangster Gangaraju	Nagaraju		
2022	Aadavallu Meeku Johaarlu	Chiru's uncle		
2022	Ashoka Vanamlo Arjuna Kalyanam	Arjun's uncle		
2022	7 Days 6 Nights			
2022	Swathi Muthyam	Bhagi's uncle		
2022	F3: Fun and Frustration	Venky's father		
2022	Sammathame	Krishna's father		
2022	Aa Ammayi Gurinchi Meeku Cheppali	Chalapathy		
2022	18 Pages	Bus Conductor		
2023	Hunt	Moorthy		
2023	Veera Simha Reddy	Head priest		
2023	Bedurulanka 2012	Village President		
2023	Bhuvana Vijayam	Chalapathi		
2023	Prema Vimanam			
2023	Votu			
2023	Rangabali	Vishwam		
2023	Writer Padmabhushan	Lokendra Kumar		
2023	Custody	Dharmaraju	Shot simultaneously in Tamil	
2023	Rules Ranjann	Ranjan's father		
2023	Samajavaragamana	Clerk		
2023	Martin Luther King			
2024	Ambajipeta Marriage Band	Narasimha		
2024	Geethanjali Malli Vachindi	Tea seller		
2024	Aa Okkati Adakku	A victim in the accident		
2024	Gangs of Godavari	Doraswamy Raju		
2024	Yevam	M. Gangadhar		
2024	Committee Kurrollu	Venkatrao		
2024	Uruku Patela	Rama Raju		
2024	Bhale Unnade	Radha’s uncle		
2024	Swag	Rajaguru / Maharshi	Dual roles	
2024	Janaka Aithe Ganaka	Prasad's father		
2024	Dhoom Dhaam	Neelakantha Bhupathi		
2024	Leela Vinodham	Leela’s father		
2025	Bhairavam	Neelima's father		
2025	Kingdom	Suri's uncle		
2025	K-Ramp	Priest		
2026	Anaganaga Oka Raju	Muhurthala Murthy		
2026	Couple Friendly	Siva’s father		
2026	Vishnu Vinyasam	Bommayya		
2026	Ustaad Bhagat Singh	Sreenu Swami		
2026	Papam Prathap	Papa Rao		
2026	Missing Meghana	Meghana’s father		

=== Television ===
Year	Title	Role	Network	Notes	Ref.
1999–2000	Sangharshana		ETV	Television Debut	
2000–2002	Vidhi		ETV		
2003–2007	Padmavyuham		ETV		
2014–2019	Muddha Mandaram	Paaru's father	Zee Telugu		
2015–2022	Seethamma Vakitlo Sirimalle Chettu		ETV		
2018–2019	Mahalakshmi		Gemini TV		
2020–2021	Girija Kalyanam	Lakshmi Narayana	Gemini TV		
2021	3 Roses	Indu's uncle	Aha	Web Debut	
2025	Devika & Danny	Devika's uncle	JioHotstar		
2025	Katha Sudha	Vedamurthula Subramanya Sastry	ETV Win	under segment Addham lo Chandamama	
2026	Super Subbu	Benjamin	Netflix		
