= The Outhouse (film) =

- Official poster
- Directed by: Leslie Carvalho
- Starring: Priscilla Corner; Ratan Thakore Grant
- Cinematography: S.Ramachandra
- Music by: Gerard Machado
- Release date: 1997
- Country: India
- Language: English

The Outhouse is a 1997 Indian English-language family drama film directed by Leslie Carvalho and starring Priscilla Corner and Ratan Thakore Grant. In 1998, the film competed in the International Film Festival of India and won the first Gollapudi Srinivas Award.

== Cast ==
- Priscilla Corner as Priscilla
- Ratan Thakore Grant as Ben
- Judith Roby Bidapa as Claire
- Chippy Gange and Poile Sengupta as a Bengali couple

== Production ==
The film marked the directorial debut of Carvalho, who did a course at the New York Film Academy. The film was shot in thirteen days.

== Reception ==
A critic from The Hindu wrote that "'The Outhouse' is an example of what intelligent cinema ought to be. The note of authenticity, the sensitive handling of a theme as delicate as marital violence and the extraordinary eye for detail (which one saw so easily in Satyajit Ray’s work) place "The Outhouse" in a class by itself". A critic from Deccan Herald opined that "The Outhouse`s accomplishment lies in its complex character portrayal of its heroine, Priscilla, and its finely observed details of the everyday, the commonplace, that other movies usually take for granted".
