= Erra Mallelu =

1981 Indian Telugu film

- Theatrical release poster
- Directed by: Dhavala Satyam
- Story by: Madala Ranga Rao
- Dialogue by: M. G. Rama Rao
- Produced by: Madala Kodanda Ramaiah
- Starring: Madala Ranga Rao; Murali Mohan; Giri Babu; Ranganath
- Cinematography: G. Mohana Krishna
- Edited by: Naini Maheswara Rao
- Music by: K. Chakravarthy
- Production company: Navataram Pictures
- Release date: 1 May 1981
- Running time: 134 minutes
- Country: India
- Language: Telugu

Erra Mallelu (transl. Red Jasmines) is a 1981 Indian Telugu-language drama film directed by Dhavala Satyam from a story written by Madala Ranga Rao. The film stars Ranga Rao, Murali Mohan, Giri Babu and Ranganath. It revolves around two men starting a revolution against their village chiefs and the owner of a factory in the neighbouring village.

Erra Mallelu was released on 1 May 1981 coinciding with the International Workers' Day (May Day), and emerged successful at the box office. The film is noted to inspire several other communist-themed films in Telugu cinema. It was remade in Tamil as Sivappu Malli (1981).

== Cast ==
- Madala Ranga Rao as Ranga
- Murali Mohan as Soori Babu
- Giri Babu as Factory owner
- Ranganath as Ramanna
- P. L. Narayana as Kamayya
- Sakshi Ranga Rao as Karanam
- P. J. Sarma as Ramayya
- Sai Chand as Kistanna
- Chalapathi Rao
- Narra Venkateswara Rao
- Nalluri Venkateswarlu as Master
- MP Prasad
- Sutti Veerabhadra Rao as Lawyer
- Pushpa Kumari
- Krishnaveni
- Lakshmi Chitra
- Sri Lakshmi
- Navata
- Siva Parvati
- K. Vijaya
- T. Krishna
- Master Ravi (cameo appearance in the song "Nampalli Station")

== Soundtrack ==
K. Chakravarthy composed the film score and original soundtrack. Lyrics are written by C. Narayana Reddy, Kondaveeti Venkatakavi, Adrustha Deepak, Prabhu, and Dhavala Satyam.

Gudipoodi Srihari, in his review for Sitara praised compositions like "Nampally Station Kada", "May Day Idi May Day", and "Jigibigi Jigijigi."

Erra Mallelu (Original Motion Picture Soundtrack)
No.	Title	Singer(s)	Length
1.	"Nampalli Station"	S. P. Sailaja	03:14
2.	"Oh Lag Gig"	S. P. Balasubrahmanyam	03:11
3.	"Anyayam Akramam"	S. P. Balasubrahmanyam	03:12
4.	"Bangaru Mathalli"	S. P. Balasubrahmanyam, G. Anand, S. P. Sailaja	00:24
Total length:			10:04

== Release and reception ==
Erra Mallelu released on 1 May 1981, coinciding with International Workers' Day (May Day). Reviewing the film for Andhra Patrika on 6 May 1981, Venkatrao appreciated the writing and direction, in addition to the performances. Gudipoodi Srihari of Sitara on 17 May 1981 praised writer-actor Madala Ranga Rao for addressing the various issues like terrorism, corruption in judicial system, worker rights etc. The film was successful at the box office. Released in 23 centres, Erra Mallelu had a 50-day theatrical run in 17 centres.

== Legacy ==
Rentala Jayadeva of Sakshi identified Erra Mallelu as a landmark amongst the communist-themed films in Telugu cinema. Jayadeva also stated that commercial success of Erra Mallelu inspired several films in the same vein, most notably, Erra Sainyam (1994) and Osey Ramulamma (1997).

The film marked first on-screen appearance of filmmaker T. Krishna. Krishna grew full beard for the role and maintained the same look until his death. Singer S. P. Sailaja got her breakthrough with the song "Nampally Station Kada." Erra Mallelu was remade in Tamil language as Sivappu Malli (1981) which had a favourable reception.

In April 2019, Kavel Alpaslan of the Turkish news outlet Gazete Duvar, identified the song "May Day Idi May Day" in his article featuring the May Day songs from the Indian subcontinent. Alpaslan felt the "enthusiastic performance" of the two lead roles played by Madala Ranga Rao and Murali Mohan made it special.
