= Lava Kusa: The Warrior Twins =

- Lava Kusa poster
- Directed by: Dhavala Satyam
- Written by: Dhavala Satyam
- Produced by: Rayudu V Sashank
- Music by: L. Vaidyanathan
- Production companies: Kanipakam Creations; RVML Animation
- Distributed by: Kanipakam Creations
- Release date: 8 October 2010
- Running time: 120 minutes
- Country: India
- Language: Hindi

Lava Kusa: The Warrior Twins is a 2010 animation film written and directed by Dhavala Satyam as a joint venture of Kanipakam Creations with RVML Animation.

== Plot ==
Lava and Kusa were born to mother Sita at Sage Valmiki's hermitage; they grew up learning the essence of Ramayana and master the art of war by using divine weapons from the guidance of Sage Valmiki. The story goes on with their thrilling childhood experiences blended with action, comedy and enchanting magical powers. The role of gigantic falcon, squirrels, monkeys, rabbits and tortoises delights not only the children but also to all age groups.

On invitation the twins set off to Ayodhya to recite Valmiki Ramayana in front of the King Rama. The story turns gripping as the twins learn that Mata Sita was sent to vanvas by Rama. They return from Ayodhya with anger and rage over Rama.

Rama performs Aswamedha yagna for the prosperity of his kingdom and sets off a horse (ashwa), which encounters with Lava Kusa finally. The twins happen to read the declaration of Rama inscribed in a golden plate on the forehead on the horse, arrests the horse considering that this would bring Rama in front of them so that they can question him regarding the ill treatment given to Mata Sita and to debate on Rama's most acclaimed principle of dharma.

They arrest the Aswamedha horse thus inviting the mighty Ayodhya Empire to a war against them. The story gets into a fast-paced array of battles packed with scintillating/thrilling action sequences blended with spell bound visual effects. Lava Kusa defeats the two brothers of Rama, Shatrughna and Lakshmana thus bringing Rama against them face to face in the battle field. Debate concludes with the start of war leading to both of them inevitably about to use the most dreaded weapons against each other. Hearing this Sita and Sage Valmiki enter the battle field and reveal the truth to Rama that these twins Lava and Kusa are his own sons.

Rama affectionately accepts the twins and praises their courage, requests Sita to return to Ayodhya. Sita refuses and recedes to the lap of her mother Bhoomatha (the goddess of earth) and merges into the earth. Rama announces Lava Kusa as the crown princes of the Ayodhya kingdom and he Backs in he's form as Vishnu

== Production ==
Pre-production of the film was announced by The Kanipakam Creations in April 2006. Using the skills of approximately 315 animators at the RVML Animation Studios in both Hyderabad and Manila, the film will be initially be released in English, Hindi and Telugu, with later versions to be dubbed into Tamil, Oriya, Bengali and other Indian languages. In 2006 L. Vaidyanathan and lyricist Veturi created 5 original compositions for the film. Hindi lyrics were written by Dharmesh Tiwari and Pandit Kiran Mishra, with Telugu lyrics written by Ramamurthy. Additional dialogues in English and Telugu were provided by K. N. Y. Patanjali and in Hindi by lyricist D.K. Goel. The film is expected to be released across India in late December 2009 or early January 2010.

== Sound Track ==
The music and background music of this film is composed by L. Vaidyanathan.This album features the voices of legendary singers like K. J. Yesudas & K.S.Chithra. Also features eminent singers like Shankar Mahadevan, Sadhana Sargam & Vijay Yesudas. This album features 5 songs and 3 instrumentals. First Veturi penned the lyrics for all the original compositions in Telugu, later the lyrics were dubbed into Hindi for original Motion Picture.

=== Hindi version ===
All lyrics were penned by Dharmesh Tiwari and Pandit Kiran Mishra.

Track Listing
No.	Title	Singer(s)	Length
1.	"Sathya Santhan"	K. J. Yesudas, Vijay Yesudas & Chorus.	5:25
2.	"Ramayana Divya Katha"	K.S.Chithra, Sadhana Sargam & Chorus.	5:08
3.	"Shree Raghunadhki"	K.S.Chithra & Sadhana Sargam	6:39
4.	"Om Shanthi Ugraroopa"	Shankar Mahadevan	4:35
5.	"Rama Nama Mahima"	Shankar Mahadevan	7:27
6.	"Hari Om Hari"	Chorus	2:12
7.	"Rhythm of Warrior Twins"	Instrumental	0:55
8.	"Rhythm of Rage"	Instrumental	3:27

=== Telugu version ===
All the lyrics are penned by Veturi.

Track Listing
No.	Title	Singer(s)	Length
1.	"Niliche Sathyam"	K. J. Yesudas, Vijay Yesudas	5:29
2.	"Ramayana Divya Katha"	K. S. Chithra, Sadhana Sargam	5:12
3.	"Shree Raghu Ramuni"	K. S. Chithra, Sadhana Sargam	6:43
4.	"Om Shanthi Ugraroopa"	Shankar Mahadevan	4:39
5.	"Rama Nama Mahima"	Shankar Mahadevan	7:30
6.	"Hari Om Hari"	Chorus	2:12
7.	"Rhythm of Warrior Twins"	Instrumental	0:55
8.	"Rhythm of Rage"	Instrumental	3:27

== Reception ==
The film is reputed to be a "magnificent 2D masterpiece", and is reported to be the most prestigious animation movie ever made in India, having a budget of Rs. 25 crores (US$5 million) and taking 3 years to complete. This film is expected to bring the Indian animation industry to international standards.

== See also ==
- List of indian animated feature films
