= Himanshu Bajpai =

Himanshu Bajpai (born 12 June 1987) is a dastango, music artist and author. He plays a stage form of storytelling in the Urdu-Hindi language known as dastangoi.

His book ‘Kissa Kissa Lucknowa-Lucknow ke Awami Kisse’ received the Sahitya Akademi Yuva Puraskar-2021. He is also the recipient of the 2023 Shri Harikrishna Trivedi Youth Award.

== Personal life ==
He was born on June 12, 1987, in the Raja Bazaar area of Lucknow. He holds a PhD degree from Mahatma Gandhi Antarrashtriya Hindi Vishwavidyalaya, Wardha, and his thesis focuses on the historic Nawal Kishor Printing Press of Lucknow.

== Dastangoi ==
Bajpai primarily brings alive the society, culture, and history of Lucknow in the Urdu-Hindi storytelling style. He is a Lucknowphile and a follower of Awadhi culture. He started learning this art form of storytelling under Mahmood Farooqui in 2013.

He has adopted many writers', authors', poets', and social activists' life stories in the form of Dastangoi. Most famously, his stories from Awadh culture, 'Qissa Lucknowaa', and many more like this.

- Dastan-E-Jaan-E-Aalam - Dastan on Wajid Ali Shah
- Dastan Khan-e-Khanan Ki - with Ankit Chadha
- Dastan-e-Aawaargi - with Ankit Chadha
- Dastan-e-Aam
- Rang-e-Kamal - Celebrate the legacy of late journalist Kamal Khan
- Dastan on Majaz Lakhnawi, Abdul Rahim Khanekhana, Amir Khusrau, Chandrakanta and Sagar Khayyami.

He has travelled to different countries in Asia, the Middle East, and Europe, where he has performed more than 150 storytelling sessions on topics like ‘Kakori’, Mahatma Gandhi, Kabir, Tulsidas, and even stories about cuisine especially about Awadhi and North Indian cuisine. His performance on 'Amir Khusrau' was held at Harvard University in 2020.

For his Awadhi style of storytelling and subject matter, he has been praised by former President Ram Nath Kovind and Prime Minister Narendra Modi on the radio program "Mann Ki Baat."

== See also ==
- Awadh Culture
- Jahan-e-Khusru
