= Indian Babu =

- Directed by: Lawrence D'Souza
- Written by: Talat Jani, Baba Khan, Sri Anand
- Produced by: Surjit Pandher
- Starring: Jaz Pandher; Gurleen Chopra
- Cinematography: Lawrence D'Souza
- Edited by: R. Rajendran
- Music by: Songs: Nadeem Shravan, Score: Naresh Sharma
- Release date: 7 March 2003
- Running time: 163 minutes
- Country: India
- Language: Hindi

Indian Babu is a 2003 Indian Bollywood romantic action drama film directed by Lawrence D'Souza and produced by Surjit Pandher. It stars Jaz Pandher and Gurleen Chopra in pivotal roles. Cast also includes Johnny Lever, Alok Nath and Mukesh Rishi.

== Plot ==
Dil (Gurleen Chopra) is getting engaged to Abhay Thakur (Rajat Gawda) against her wish. Suddenly she feels pain in her heart and it is discovered she has a hole in her heart. Abhay's uncle who is from London decides to send Dil to London for her treatment. There she meets Jeet (Jaz Pandher) and after a few meetings, they fall in love with each other. Later during a party, where Dil and Jeet are, Abhay Thakur comes there and Abhay's uncle announces that Abhay and Dil are engaged. Jeet becomes heartbroken. Abhay takes Dil back to India and starts preparing for the wedding. Jeet's father says go to India and get my daughter-in-law. Jeet's father sends a letter with Jeet to give to a woman. The woman was Jeet's real mother and she gave her son to the couple that lives in London because Abhay's father had misunderstandings with her. Jeet finds out and he then introduces Dil to her. Abhay's father warns Jeet's real mother to tell her son to stay away from Dil as she will marry his son. Jeet still goes and meets Dil. On the day of the wedding Jeet and Dil run away to get married in a temple where Jeet's London parents are there too. Unfortunately, Abhay and his father reach there and stop the wedding. Later when the Thankur is about to shoot Jeet, Thakur's sister-in-law comes in front and clears out the misunderstanding between everyone. Everyone there present watches Dil and Jeet get married.

== Cast ==
- Jaz Pandher - Jeet
- Gurleen Chopra - Dil Thakur/Dil Kuljeet Khurana, Abhay's ex-fiancée, Kuljeet's wife
- Mukesh Rishi - Thakur Suraj Pratap Singh
- Johnny Lever - Mr. Patel/Principal (Patel Bond 008)
- Nishigandha Wad
- Alok Nath - Sharad Babu
- Rajat Gawda - Abhay Thakur
- Mohan Joshi - Karan, Abhay's uncle
- Debina Bonnerjee - Dil's step sister
- Avantika - Dil's step sister
- Shama Deshpande - Asha Sharma (Jeet's biological mother)

== Soundtrack ==
The music of this movie was composed by Nadeem–Shravan, while the lyrics were written by Sameer.

#	Title	Singer(s)
1.	"Hum Deewane Hum Deewane Hai Tere"	Jaspinder Narula
2.	"Dil Mera Dil Mera Dil"	Kumar Sanu
3.	"Aap Humse Pyar Karne Lage"	Alka Yagnik, Kumar Sanu
4.	"Hum Deewane Hum"	Jaspinder Narula, Sabri Brothers
5.	"Rabba Rabba"	Alka Yagnik, Udit Narayan, Kunal Ganjawala
6.	"Aaya Dulha Aaya"	Kumar Sanu, Sarika Kapoor, Nirja Pandit
7.	"Mere Sang Sang"	Alka Yagnik, Kumar Sanu
8.	"I Wanna Take You"	KK
9.	"Dil Mera Dil Mera Dil-II"	Kumar Sanu
