= Gurleen Chopra =

Indian actress and model

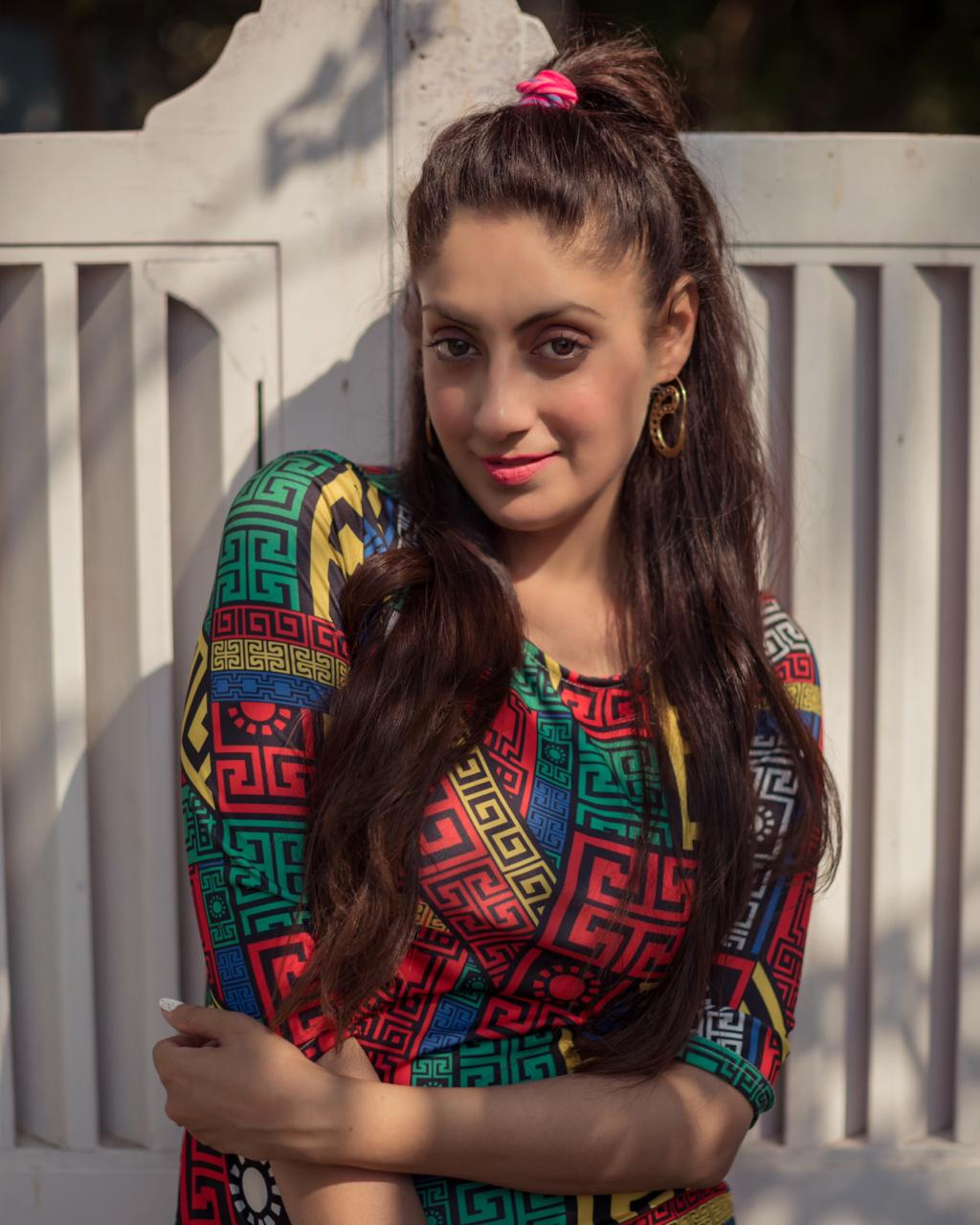
- Born: Chandigarh, India
- Occupations: Actress, Model
- Years active: 2003–2020
- Website: www.counsellingwithgc.com

Gurleen Chopra, also known as Gurleen Kaur Chopra, is an Indian actress and model. She has appeared in Hindi, Telugu, Tamil, Marathi, Kannada and Punjabi films.

== Early life ==
Gurleen Chopra was crowned Miss Chandigarh in her youth. Encouraged by her friends to try modelling, she went on to pursue a career in film.

== Career ==
Gurleen Chopra made her debut as a model in famous song by Surjit Bindrakhiya "Tedi Tedi Takdi Tu" in 1999. Gurleen Chopra made her debut in the Hindi film, Indian Babu. Her next Hindi film was Kuch To Gadbad Hai, in which she played an orphan girl Riya. She debuted in Telugu cinema with Ayudham and later acted in many Telugu, Kannada and Tamil films. She played a double role in Manmatha. About her performance in the film, Sify had written, "Gurlin Chopra is impressive as Lakshmi in the blind get-up", and Rediff had written that she "has done a neat job in both her roles". She signed and shot her first Tamil film Thullal in 2004, but it released only in 2007. She then started acting in Punjabi films. Her film Hashar, opposite Babbu Mann was a hit. After a long hiatus, she signed a Telugu film titled Konaseemalo Chittemma Kittayya in 2009. She acted in a 3D Telugu romantic comedy Vasthavam.

She started shooting for her Marathi debut film Shinma in May 2015.

== Filmography ==
Year	Film	Role	Language	Notes
2003	Indian Babu	Dil	Hindi	
2003	Aayudham	Sravani	Telugu	
2004	Oka Pellam Muddu Rendo Pellam Vaddu	Meena	Telugu	
2004	Nenu Saitham		Telugu	
2004	Saradara	Priya	Kannada	
2004	Kuch To Gadbad Hai	Riya Singh	Hindi	Dubbed in Telugu as Mogudu Pellala Dongata
2005	Vishnu Sena		Kannada	
2005	Kaaki	Farah	Telugu	
2006	Baghi	Preet	Punjabi	
2006	Pandavaru	Anjali	Kannada	
2006	Bhagam Bhag	Nisha Chauhan	Hindi	
2007	Manmatha	Lakshmi / Priya	Kannada	
2007	Thullal	Sruthika	Tamil	
2008	Hashar: A Love Story	Shagan	Punjabi	
2010	Kabaddi Ikk Mohabbat	Raunaq Gill	Punjabi	
2010	Naane Ennul Illai		Tamil	
2012	Ajj De Ranjhe	Kranti	Punjabi	
2012	Sirphire	Jazz	Punjabi	
2014	Pandavulu Pandavulu Thummeda		Telugu	
2014	Kirpaan: The Sword of Honour	Jasmine	Punjabi	
2014	Siva Keshav		Telugu	
2014	Aa Gaye Munde U.K. De	Dolly	Punjabi	
2015	Shinma		Marathi	
2015	International Hero		Hindi	
2017	Ashley	Ashley	Hindi	
2017	Game Over	Sanaya	Hindi	
2019	Jai Chhathi Maa		Hindi	
2020	1840 Hyderabad	Simran	Hindi	
