= Aa Ammayi Gurinchi Meeku Cheppali =

2022 film by Mohana Krishna Indraganti

- Theatrical release poster
- Directed by: Mohana Krishna Indraganti
- Written by: Mohana Krishna Indraganti
- Produced by: B. Mahendra Babu; Kiran Ballapalli
- Starring: Sudheer Babu; Krithi Shetty
- Cinematography: P. G. Vinda
- Edited by: Marthand K. Venkatesh
- Music by: Vivek Sagar
- Production companies: Benchmark Studios; Mythri Movie Makers
- Release date: 16 September 2022
- Running time: 145 minutes
- Country: India
- Language: Telugu
- Budget: ₹20 crore

Aa Ammayi Gurinchi Meeku Cheppali (transl. I must tell you about that girl) is a 2022 Indian Telugu-language romantic drama film written and directed by Mohana Krishna Indraganti and produced by Benchmark Studios and Mythri Movie Makers. The film stars Sudheer Babu and Krithi Shetty. The music is composed by Vivek Sagar with cinematography by P. G. Vinda and editing by Marthand K. Venkatesh.

The film was released on 16 September 2022 to mixed reviews and was a box-office bomb.

== Plot ==
Naveen is a film director in Telugu cinema who has just scored his sixth consecutive hit and wants to make a commercially successful female-centric film. After returning from his producer Fancy Parameshwar's house, a garbage truck dumps rubbish onto his car. He discovers an old container holding a film reel and, after watching it, becomes mesmerised by a girl performing in it. Determined to find her, he learns that she is an eye doctor named Alekhya. He approaches her about starring in his film, but she initially resents him because her family deeply distrusts cinema.

At an event at Alekhya's hospital, Naveen is invited as chief guest and gives her a present. Afterwards, a couple tells him how his films positively affected their deceased son. Moved by their story, Alekhya opens Naveen's gift and visits him. He shows her the reel, whereupon she reveals that the girl is actually her deceased identical twin sister, Akhila.

Akhila had been passionate about acting since childhood, but their parents opposed it because they feared damage to the family's reputation, particularly after her performance in a Romeo and Juliet play. She later acted in a film directed by her friend Deepak, but her father forcibly withdrew her from the production. Akhila left home and eventually married Deepak without her parents' knowledge, prompting them to disown her. When Deepak's producer and family died in a car accident, the film was abandoned. Deepak fell into depression and committed suicide, leaving Akhila devastated. She subsequently killed herself by jumping from her apartment building, causing her family to reject cinema completely.

Moved by their story, Naveen decides to make a film about Akhila and Deepak's lives. He pitches the idea to Venkat, who approves it, then asks Alekhya to play Akhila. She is reluctant, so Naveen reveals his own painful past. Early in his career, a producer offered him a directing opportunity on the condition that he persuade his former girlfriend to accept a casting couch arrangement in exchange for a lead role and his chance to direct. After she pressured him to accept, he was unable to cope and contemplated suicide. However, seeing news of Deepak's death motivated him to pursue commercial cinema and financial success. Naveen assures Alekhya that he now genuinely wants to honour Akhila and Deepak through the film. She agrees to participate secretly.

Naveen and Alekhya gradually fall in love. Meanwhile, her parents introduce her to Varun, a scientist and family friend's son whom they hope she will marry. Varun later meets Alekhya while playing a minor role in Naveen's film and ultimately accepts her decision. Their secret is exposed when a relative sees Alekhya on set. Enraged, her parents confront her, while Alekhya condemns them for suppressing Akhila and contributing to her despair. She leaves home after her father becomes concerned about gossip surrounding her and Naveen, and resolves to finish the film.

Once production ends, Naveen approaches Alekhya's parents and explains his sincere intention to honour Akhila and Deepak. He promises that, if the film does not change their views, he will leave Alekhya, never release it and never face them again. They attend the premiere despite their hostility. As the film unfolds, they recognise their mistakes. Naveen then reveals that he incorporated footage from Akhila's original reel, prompting them to break down emotionally.

In the climax, Naveen gives credit to "Fancy" Parmeshwar, who supported him early in his career, and funds the film's new producer. The resulting film becomes a huge success, with Akhila receiving a Filmfare Award posthumously and dedicating it to her parents. After watching it, her parents tell Naveen and Alekhya that they are proud of them and grateful for the tribute to Akhila and Deepak. Naveen and Alekhya subsequently make their relationship official.

== Cast ==
- Sudheer Babu as Naveen
- Krithi Shetty in a dual role as:
  - Dr. Alekhya
  - Akhila
- Srikanth Iyengar as Manohar, Alekhya and Akhila's father
- Kalyani Natarajan as Sumithra, Alekhya and Akhila's mother
- Srinivas Avasarala as Dr. Varun
- Vennela Kishore as Bose, Naveen's AD
- Rahul Ramakrishna as Venkat, Government College lecturer and writer & Naveen's best friend
- Viswant Duddumpudi as Deepak, Akhila's boyfriend and later husband
- Srinivas as "Fancy" Parameshwar.
- Thalaivasal Vijay as Dr. James Kutty, Alekhya's boss
- Kunal Kaushik as reel Deepak
- Satish Saripalli
- Vamsi Raghava Yenumula
- Goparaju Ramana

== Production ==
In November 2020, it was announced that Sudheer Babu and Mohana Krishna Indraganti were coming together for the third time under the tentative title #Sudheer14 after Sammohanam (2018) and V (2020). In March 2021 the film's title was announced as Aa Ammayi Gurinchi Meeku Cheppali.

It was announced in January 2021 that Krithi Shetty was brought on board for the lead female role in the film.

The principal photography of the film began on 1 March 2021.

== Soundtrack ==
The film score and soundtrack of the film is composed by Vivek Sagar. The music rights were acquired by Saregama.

Track listing
No.	Title	Lyrics	Singer(s)	Length
1.	"Kottha Kottha Gaa"	Ramajogayya Sastry	Chaitra Ambadipudi, Abhay Jodhpurkar	5:26
2.	"Meere Herolaa"	Ramajogayya Sastry	Vijay Prakash, Hemachandra, Anurag Kulkarni, Balaji Dake, Vishnu Priya	3:48
3.	"Aa Merupemito"	Sirivennela Seetharama Sastry	Anurag Kulkarni	4:33
Total length:				13:47

== Reception ==
Sangeetha Devi of The Hindu wrote about the film as "Earnest and fairly engaging ode to cinema". Neeshita Nyayapati of The Times of India rated the film 3 out of 5 stars and wrote "AAGMC is not a perfect film by any means because there are scenes you wish would've been written better and conversations that delve deeper". Pinkvilla rated the film 2.5 out of 5 stars and wrote "Themes such as overcoming pangs of guilt, self-redemption, living someone's dream, and finding peace in defying conventions, are drowned out by many below-ordinary scenes. The Hans India rated the film 2 out of 5 stars and wrote "The patchy writing doesn't elevate the proceedings. An inconsistency is felt, and that's where Aa Ammayi Gurinchi Meeku Cheppali falters." Sakshi Post rated the film 2 out of 5 stars and opined that the film offers nothing new.
