= Anusha Rizvi =

Indian film director and screenwriter (born 1978)

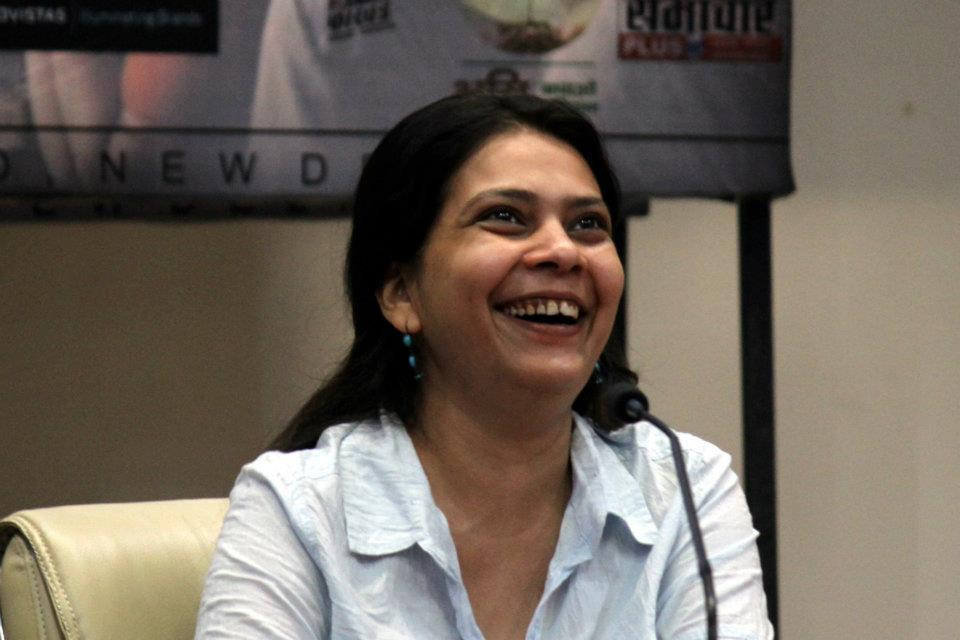
- Born: 13 March 1978 (age 48); Delhi, India
- Occupations: Film director, screenwriter
- Spouse: Mahmood Farooqui

Anusha Rizvi (born 13 March 1978) is an Indian film director and screenwriter. Formerly a journalist, Anusha's directorial debut, Peepli Live, premiered at the Sundance Film Festival 2010 in the World Competition Section. It was the first Indian film to be accepted in the 25 years of the festival's existence. The film also won the Best First Film Award at the Durban film festival and the Gollapudi Srinivas Award.

The film was later selected as India's official entry to the 83rd Academy Awards for Best Foreign Language Film. She has directed two BBC documentaries Amul and Khadi. As well as having worked as an associate producer on a National Geographic documentary Hijack IC-814.

== Career ==
Anusha Rizvi was a journalist before venturing into film direction. She graduated in history from St. Stephen's College, University of Delhi. She approached Aamir Khan to make the film who finally did support her with "Peepli Live".

As of 2020, Rizvi was developing a series entitled "Dastan-e-Haroun". Based on Salaman Rushdie's "Haroun and the Sea of Stories", adapted by Poonam Girdhani and to be directed by Mahmood Farooqui for the leading Indian platform, Hotstar. She is also the producer of Dastangoi Collective 's productions.

Positions and advocacy

In 2012, Rizvi along with several Indian artists, Social activists and legal scholars in signing an appeal to President of India Pranab Mukherjee concerning Ajmal Kasab, who had been sentenced to death for his role in the 2008 Mumbai attacks. The signatories called for his sentence to be committed to life imprisonment, citing their opposition to capital punishment and human rights concerns.

== Personal life ==
Anusha is married to noted writer and film director Mahmood Farooqui. Daughter of Pro. Mujeeb Rizvi, who founded Hindi department of Jamia Millia Islamia in 1971.

== Filmography ==
- Peepli Live – Director and writer
- The Great Shamsuddin Family – Director and writer
