= Aayudham (2003 film) =

- Directed by: N. Shankar
- Written by: N. Shankar
- Produced by: Srinivasa Rao
- Starring: Rajasekhar; Sangeetha; Brahmanandam; Gurleen Chopra
- Cinematography: Jaswanth
- Music by: Vandemataram Srinivas
- Release date: 22 May 2003
- Country: India
- Language: Telugu

Aayudham (transl. Weapon) is a 2003 Indian Telugu-language film, directed by N. Shankar and produced by Srinivasa Rao. The film stars Rajasekhar, Sangeetha, Brahmanandam and Gurleen Chopra.

== Cast ==
- Rajasekhar as Siddarth, a scientist who opposes factionalism
- Gurleen Chopra as Sravani
- Sangeetha as Kalyani, Siddartha’s sister-in-law
- Brahmanandam as Choudappa, Varadaraju’s assistant
- Rajan P. Dev as Varadaraju, Sravani’s father
- Sivaji as Rushendra (Rishi), Sravani’s second brother
- A. V. S. as Raghupati’s right-hand man
- Jaya Prakash Reddy as Raghupati, Siddartha’s father
- Ali as Raghupati’s assistant
- Banerjee as Sravani’s eldest brother
- Shanoor Sana as Sravani’s mother
- Siva Parvathi as Siddartha’s mother
- Ahuti Prasad as Industrialist
- Narra Venkateswara Rao as Police Commissioner
- Ashok Kumar as Minister
- Kaushal Manda as Sravan, Commissioner’s son
- Kalabhavan Mani as Pithapuram, Police Officer
- Babloo Prithiveeraj as Minister’s son
- Gundu Sudarshan
- Venu Madhav as Industrialist’s assistant
- Sona Heiden as Varadaraju’s house-maid
- Ananth Babu as Raghupati’s astrologer
- Gundu Hanumantha Rao as Varadaraju’s astrologer

== Soundtrack ==
The music was composed by Vandemataram Srinivas.

No.	Song	Singers	Lyrics	Length (m:ss)
1	"Oye Raju"	Udit Narayan, Usha	Bheems Ceciroleo	04.14
2	"Meghale Evela"	Shankar Mahadevan, Swarnalatha	Warangal Srinivas	05.00
3	"Bangarubomma Rave"	Vandemataram Srinivas, Usha	Suddala Ashok Teja	05.03
4	"Abba Yem"	Shankar Mahadevan, Anuradha Sriram	Srivare	04.34
5	"Ranga Reddy Zilla"	Udit Narayan, Kalpana Raghavendar	Padma Srinivas	04.42
6	"Idemitamma"	Kumar Sanu, Rashmi	Chinni Charan	05.05

== Critical reception ==
BVS Prakash of Screen wrote "Though we should appreciate director Shankar for making an ‘anti-factionism’ film in this season, he fails to make it a winner since he sketches a confusing protagonist and disjointed screenplay".
