= Erra cinema =

Collection of political films in Telugu

Erra Cinema (Telugu: ఎర్ర), literally translating to "Red Cinema", refers to a collection of films in Telugu attributed to various left-oriented political ideologies. Although it cannot be understood as a genre, it owes its nomenclature to the popular coinage and reference. The Communist parties in Andhra Pradesh are popularly referred to as the 'Erra partilu' (Red Parties) or 'Erra jenda partilu' (Red Flag Parties). This reference is extended to films which portray the struggles of the oppressed and the downtrodden often banded under the aegis of a 'Red flag' party. Significant here is the ambiguity in the affiliation to the ideologies of specific political parties who commonly use red flags as symbols. This cinema is not always of an art-house variety. As with other cinemas in India, Telugu cinema attracted the cultural workers of the left and the left leaning intellectuals. Erra Cinema regularly uses their literature and particularly songs penned or performed by them. Due to the portrayal of the triumph of the proletarian collective over the hegemonic order these films are considered to be anti-establishment. This view may have strengthened with the portrayal of Naxalites or Maoists in these films. These films are also referred to as Naxalite films. K. B. Tilak, Dhavala Satyam, Vejjella Satyanarayana, Madala Ranga Rao, T. Krishna, R. Narayana Murthy, Dasari Narayana Rao, N. Shankar are some of the directors who have produced films categorised under Erra Cinema.
