= Kirpaan: The Sword of Honour =

- Directed by: Amrik Gill
- Produced by: Rajinder Pal Singh Banwait
- Starring: Roshan Prince; Gurleen Chopra; Sameksha Singh; Kulbhushan Kharbanda; Vikas Verma; Sunita Dhir; Shavender Mahal; Jatinder Bhardwaj; HARRY JOSH; Parmish Verma
- Edited by: Suresh Chatruvedi, Param Dhillon
- Music by: Gurmeet Singh
- Production company: Rabaab Records Pvt. Ltd.
- Release date: 7 February 2014
- Country: India
- Language: Punjabi

Kirpaan: The Sword of Honour is a Punjabi film directed by Amrik Gill and produced by Rajinder Pal Singh Banwait. The story is set in 1850, 1940 and 2013. The film was released on 7 February 2014.

== Plot ==
This movie is about a boy, Beeru (Roshan Prince), who studies at a college but is not serious about his future and doesn't study. His father is always annoyed with him whereas his mother and sister love him and always stands by his side. He loves a girl named Seerat Sandhu. Though she also likes him, she doesn't like his carefree attitude. He is caught copying in exams and is debarred for three years. On the other hand, Seerat Sandhu is intelligent and wants to make her future. She goes to Chandigarh for higher studies. Beeru goes to meet Seerat Sandhu at the university, but she gives him a cold shoulder. Beeru is devastated. He further knows that his friend Pargat has committed suicide due to failing in exams. He gets a chance to visit his friend Paala in the UK where he learns about a sword of his ancestors which is lying in a museum. He learns that his ancestor was hanged, and the sword ordered to be kept in museum. He steals the sword and goes to India. Seerat is a police officer, who vows to arrest him.

== Cast ==
- Roshan Prince as Beeru
- Gurleen Chopra as Jasmine
- Sameksha Singh as Seerat Sandhu
- Kulbhushan Kharbanda as Beeru's father
- Vikas Verma
- Parmish Verma
- Sunita Dhir
- Shavender Mahal
- Jatinder Bhardwaj
- Harry Josh
- Amit Khanna Museum bodyguard
