= Manmatha (film) =

2007 film directed by N. Rajesh Fernandes

- VCD cover
- Directed by: N. Rajesh Fernandes
- Written by: Venkatesh Prasad (dialogue)
- Screenplay by: N. Rajesh Fernandes
- Story by: Benny P. Nayarambalam
- Produced by: Raymond Quadrus
- Starring: Jaggesh; Gurleen Chopra
- Music by: Bharathi Das
- Release date: 27 July 2007
- Country: India
- Language: Kannada

Manmatha is a 2007 Indian Kannada-language comedy drama film directed by N.Rajesh Fernandes. starring Jaggesh and Gurleen Chopra in a dual role. The film is a remake of Malayalam film Kunjikoonan (2002). The film was released to mixed-to-negative reviews but was a box office success.

== Plot ==
Putswamy is an ugly village youth who covers up his handicap with humor. Despite jibes directed at him, he looks for a bride with the help of his friend.

Soorya is a violent college student who loves his classmate, Priya. She comes across Chinna, who assures her that he will get her married to the man of her heart. She is killed in a fracas involving a gangster. Meanwhile, the hunchback Putswamy comes across an orphaned poor blind girl, Lakshmi. He wins her heart by helping to transplant the eyes of the deceased Priya to Lakshmi, who regains her vision. This results in a fight between Putswamy and Soorya as to whom Lakshmi belongs. Putswamy is a hunchback, so he decides to leave way for Soorya. But fate has something else in store for him.

== Cast ==
- Jaggesh as Puttaswamy (Prem) and Soorya
- Gurleen Chopra as Priya and Lakshmi
- Komal Kumar as the marriage broker
- Umesh
- Killer Venkatesh
- Janardhan
- Chetan Rai
- Biradar
- Ratnakar
- Arasikere Raju
- Ashalatha
- Pooja Gandhi as herself in the song "Hunnime Banna"

== Soundtrack ==
The soundtrack was composed by Bharathi Das. The songs "Kunjande" and "Kadanje Chandanamo" from the original Malayalam film was reused here as "Hunnima Banne" and "Danthada Bombe".

No.	Title	Singer(s)	Length
1.	"Hunnime Banna"	Karthik
2.	"Danthada Bombe"	S. P. Balasubrahmanyam
3.	"Surya Banda"	Anuradha Sriram, Nanditha
4.	"Kannina Modalu"	Madhu Balakrishnan
5.	"Surya Kirana"	Mukesh

== Reception ==
R. G. Vijayasarathy of IANS rated the film two-and-three quarters out of five stars and wrote that "Manmatha will be remembered the performance of its lead artists and a neat narration. But there is nothing special about this film". A critic from Rediff.com rated the film two-and-a-half out of five stars and wrote that "If Manmatha is slightly above average, it is only because of Jaggesh and Komal". A critic from The Times of India gave the same rating and wrote that "Director Rajesh Fernandes should know that Jaggesh's forte are his mannerisms, body language and dialogue delivery. In Manmatha, the director has him playing a physically challenged character -- a role which hardly exploits his talent in this love story".
