= Indraganti Srikanth =

Indian lyricist and writer (1944–2019)

- Born: May 29, 1944; Ramachandrapuram, East Godavari, Andhra Pradesh
- Died: July 25, 2019 (aged 75); Hyderabad, India
- Occupations: Lyricist; Writer; Poet
- Spouse: Janaki Bala
- Children: Mohan Krishna Indraganti (son), Kiranmayi Indraganti (daughter)
- Parent: Indraganti Hanumath Sastry (father)
- Writing career
- Language: Telugu
- Years active: 1976–2018

Indraganti Srikanth Sarma (29 May 1944 – 25 July 2019), was an Indian Telugu lyricist and writer. He wrote books, including short stories, radio plays, poetry and primarily lyrics during his lifetime career and was actively involved in Telugu literature and cinema of south Indian film industry.

He was born in Ramachandrapuram, East Godavari town of Andhra Pradesh. He was born to Indraganti Hanumath Sastry. He married Janaki Bala, from whom he a son Mohan Krishna Indraganti and a daughter Kiranmayi Indraganti.

== Career ==
Srikanth began his career with a Telugu weekly newspaper Andhra Jyothi where he worked as a journalist. Later in 1976, he joined the All India Radio's domestic serve in Vijayawada where he used to write scripts for radio plays throughout his twenty years of service. Prior to start literary career, he worked at the Andhra Prabha weekly newspaper as an editor. He wrote lyrics for Telugu films, including for his first film Sri Krishnavataram in 1982, Nelavanka (1983), Chaitanya Ratham (1987), and for his last film Sammohanam in 2018. His lyrics also appears in several films directed by Mohan Krishna Indraganti. He wrote novels, poems and documentaries such as Telugu Kavula Aparadhalu, Malavika, and his own autobiography titled Inti Peru Indraganti.

=== Publications and work ===
Key
†	Remarks denote a short description of the work where available.

#	Title	Year	Type/Credited as	Remarks
1	Devarakonda Balagangadhar Tilak	—N/a	Book	—N/a
2	Telugu Kavula Aparadhalu	—N/a	Book	—N/a
3	Yekantha Kokila	—N/a	Book	—N/a
4	Inti Peru Indraganti	—N/a	Autobiography	—N/a
5	Malavika	—N/a	Book	—N/a
6	Sri Krishnavataram	—N/a	Lyricist	—N/a
7	Nelavanka	—N/a	Lyricist	—N/a
8	Rendu Jella Sita	—N/a	Lyricist	—N/a
	Chaitanya Ratham		Lyricist	
9	Puttadi Bomma	—N/a	Lyricist	—N/a
10	Anthaka Mundu Aa Tarvatha	—N/a	Lyricist	—N/a
11	Sammohanam	—N/a	Lyricist	—N/a

== Death ==
Srikanth Sharma was suffering from aging-associated disease and died of medical complications in Hyderabad on 25 July 2019.
