= Yuvatharam Kadilindi =

- Poster
- Directed by: Dhavala Satyam
- Produced by: Madala Ranga Rao
- Starring: Murali Mohan; Radhika; K. Vijaya; Narra Venkateswara Rao; M. Prabhakar Reddy
- Music by: T. Chalapathi Rao
- Release date: 1980
- Country: India
- Language: Telugu

Yuvatharam Kadilindi (transl. The youth has marched forward) is a 1980 Telugu-language drama film directed by Dhavala Satyam. It was produced by Madala Ranga Rao of Navatharam Pictures. It stars Murali Mohan and Radhika. The film won three Nandi Awards. The film was remade in Tamil as Sanga Natham.

The plot is based on socialist principles and the youth movement.

== Plot ==
A passionate group of educated, unemployed village youth face severe economic exploitation and social injustice by an oppressive local landlord.

Led by a determined young man, the youth group rejects traditional submissiveness, organizing the villagers to challenge the landlord's corrupt grip over their livelihoods.

== Cast ==
- Murali Mohan
- Radhika
- Rama Krishna
- K. Vijaya
- Prabhakar Reddy
- Nagabhushanam
- Narra Venkateswara Rao
- Chalapathi Rao as Pothuraju

== Soundtrack ==
The music was composed by T. Chalapathi Rao.

1. "Allare Pallavi Anduke Allari" – [Lyric Writer and Music: T. Chalapathi Rao] The last of the 2 songs penned by T. Chalapathi Rao, his first lyric being for the film 'PremaKanuka' in 1969.
2. "Ashayala Pandirilo Anuragam Sandadilo" (Lyrics: C. Narayana Reddy; Music: T. Chalapathi Rao; Singer: V. Ramakrishna)
3. "Nandare Lokamento Chitramura Nandare Rangurangula Ratnamura" {Burrakatha}
4. "O Chinnadana Ennenno Vannechinnelunnadana Eluru Chinnadana" (Lyrics: C. Narayana Reddy; Music: T. Chalapathi Rao)
5. "Yuvatharam Kadilindi" (Lyrics: C. Narayana Reddy; Music: T. Chalapathi Rao)

== Reception ==
Bose of Andhra Patrika wrote positively about the direction, story, photography and the performance of the cast. K. Ganapathi Rao of Sitara Weekly appreciated the film and wrote positively about the story, direction and the performance of the cast.

== Accolades ==
Nandi Awards – 1980

- Best Feature Film – Gold – Madala Ranga Rao
- Best Actor – M. Prabhakar Reddy
- Second Best Story Writer – Madala Ranga Rao
