= Assassination of Vangaveeti Mohana Ranga =

1988 murder in Vijayawada, India

- Location: Vijayawada, Andhra Pradesh, India
- Date: 26 December 1988
- Target: Vangaveeti Mohana Ranga
- Attack type: Assassination
- Weapons: Axes, smoke bombs

On 26 December 1988, Vangaveeti Mohana Ranga, a prominent political leader in Andhra Pradesh, India, and a Member of the Legislative Assembly (MLA), was assassinated during a hunger strike in Vijayawada. His death triggered widespread riots and violence across the state, particularly in the Coastal districts of Krishna, Guntur, East Godavari, and West Godavari. The unrest resulted in 42 deaths, extensive property damage estimated at ₹200–300 crore (equivalent to ₹800–1200 crore in 2024) in Vijayawada alone, and a curfew in the city that lasted over 40 days.

The political fallout included the resignation of the state's Home Minister and the director general of police (DGP). Although 44 individuals, including prominent political figures, were arrested, all surviving accused were acquitted by 2002 due to insufficient evidence. Ranga's assassination remains a significant event in Andhra Pradesh's political history, underscoring deep-seated rivalries and their lasting impact on the state's socio-political fabric.

== Background ==
Vangaveeti Mohana Ranga Rao, a prominent political figure in Andhra Pradesh and leader of the Kapu community, was known for his outspoken stance on social and political issues. His popularity was particularly strong among the masses. Ranga's political influence, however, led to tensions with rival factions. He was a rival of Devineni Nehru, who was a politician of the Telugu Desam Party (TDP). Both of them rallied their respective communities behind them for support – the Kapu community for Ranga, and the Kamma community for Nehru. On 10 March 1988, Nehru's younger brother Murali was murdered, allegedly by Ranga's henchmen. On 26 December 1988, Ranga was assassinated at the age of 41 while on a hunger strike in Vijayawada, where he was demanding land reforms and protesting against alleged police brutality. Ranga had previously accused local government officials affiliated with the Telugu Desam Party of plotting to kill him and had called for enhanced security.

== Assassination ==
On the day of the assassination, 26 December 1988, Ranga was sitting under a canopy outside the city hall in Vijayawada when he and his aides were attacked with axes and knives. The murder was surrounded by controversy, with Ranga's supporters alleging a political conspiracy orchestrated by the ruling TDP. The assassination marked a significant turning point in the political climate of Andhra Pradesh.

== Aftermath ==
=== Riots and violence ===
The murder of Ranga led to widespread violence across Andhra Pradesh, particularly in Vijayawada, Guntur, and the Godavari districts. Riots erupted, with Congress Party supporters clashing with police, vandalizing shops, and attacking the properties of rival party members, including stoning the homes of TDP ministers.

The unrest resulted in the deaths of at least 35 people by 27 December, with over 200 others injured. In response, the authorities imposed dusk-to-dawn curfews in 20 cities and towns and deployed over 2,700 security officers from Andhra Pradesh and neighboring states. Despite soldiers being stationed in Vijayawada, they were not actively deployed to quell the violence.

By 27 December, a statewide general strike had been enforced by Congress Party activists, who attacked shops, state government offices, and vehicles. In Vijayawada, a mob attempted to storm the mortuary at the public hospital to retrieve the bodies of those killed by police gunfire during the riots. Police intervened, dispersing the crowd.

The state government reported that 25 people were killed on 26 December, most of them by police gunfire. However, hospital sources stated that the morgue contained 32 bodies, with many deaths attributed to police shootings. Two additional deaths were linked to earlier mob attacks, and one TDP supporter was reportedly beaten to death by Congress Party activists. On 27 December, another death occurred, along with three additional injuries. Approximately 80 protesters were arrested in Vijayawada, and 300 more were detained in Hyderabad.

The Congress Party accused the TDP of orchestrating Ranga's murder as part of a political conspiracy to eliminate rivals. The violence and rioting lasted for nearly two months, with mobs attacking properties associated with TDP supporters, particularly those from the Kamma community. Numerous establishments, including theatres, shopping complexes, bars, and restaurants, were destroyed. Public and private vehicles, as well as government offices, were also targeted.

Key Incidents

The riots saw widespread arson and looting, with iconic establishments such as Alankar, Kalyana Chakravarthy, and Jai Hind theatres being set ablaze. Several businesses, including Roy Tyres, Mangaldeep, and Raymond's showrooms, were looted. Branded clothing, electronics, and consumer durables were stolen or destroyed. In one incident, a house owner in Patamata Lanka fired upon rioters in self-defense. Reports also emerged of some business owners setting fire to their own properties in an attempt to claim insurance fraudulently. Vehicles were similarly dismantled and burned for similar reasons. 269 buses were damaged during the riots, according to Andhra Pradesh officials.

=== Economic impact ===
The total economic damage from the riots was estimated at ₹200–300 crore (equivalent to ₹800–1200 crore in 2024) in Vijayawada alone. Notably, property worth approximately ₹100 crore was reportedly destroyed or looted on a single street named after Annie Besant. Many shopkeepers, whose properties were uninsured, faced significant financial losses. In the aftermath of the violence, there was a surge in insurance registrations as business owners sought to protect themselves from future losses.

== Response ==
The riots prompted the imposition of a curfew in Vijayawada for over 40 days. Shoot-at-sight orders were issued, and the Indian Army and Central Reserve Police Force (CRPF) were deployed to assist local police in restoring order. Despite these measures, the violence persisted for weeks.

The political fallout included the resignation of Andhra Pradesh's home minister, Kodela Siva Prasada Rao, and the director general of police (DGP). Chief Minister Nandamuri Taraka Rama Rao ordered the surrender of Devineni Rajasekhar (Nehru), a TDP leader and rival of Ranga and key accused in the case.

== Legal proceedings ==
A total of 44 individuals were charged with involvement in Ranga's murder. However, by 2002, the 33 accused who had survived were acquitted due to lack of evidence. One of the accused, Chalasani Venkateswara Rao (Pandu), was murdered in 2010.

== Legacy ==
Ranga's assassination and the subsequent riots marked a turning point in Andhra Pradesh's politics. Statues and memorials dedicated to Ranga reflect his lasting influence on the region's political and cultural landscape. The violence also underscored the devastating consequences of political unrest, shaping the state's approach to governance and public security.

== In popular culture ==
Sahasame Naa Oopiri, a 1989 film directed by Vijaya Nirmala and starring Krishna in the lead role was based on the murder of Mohana Ranga.
