= Chalam (writer) =

Indian Telugu-language writer

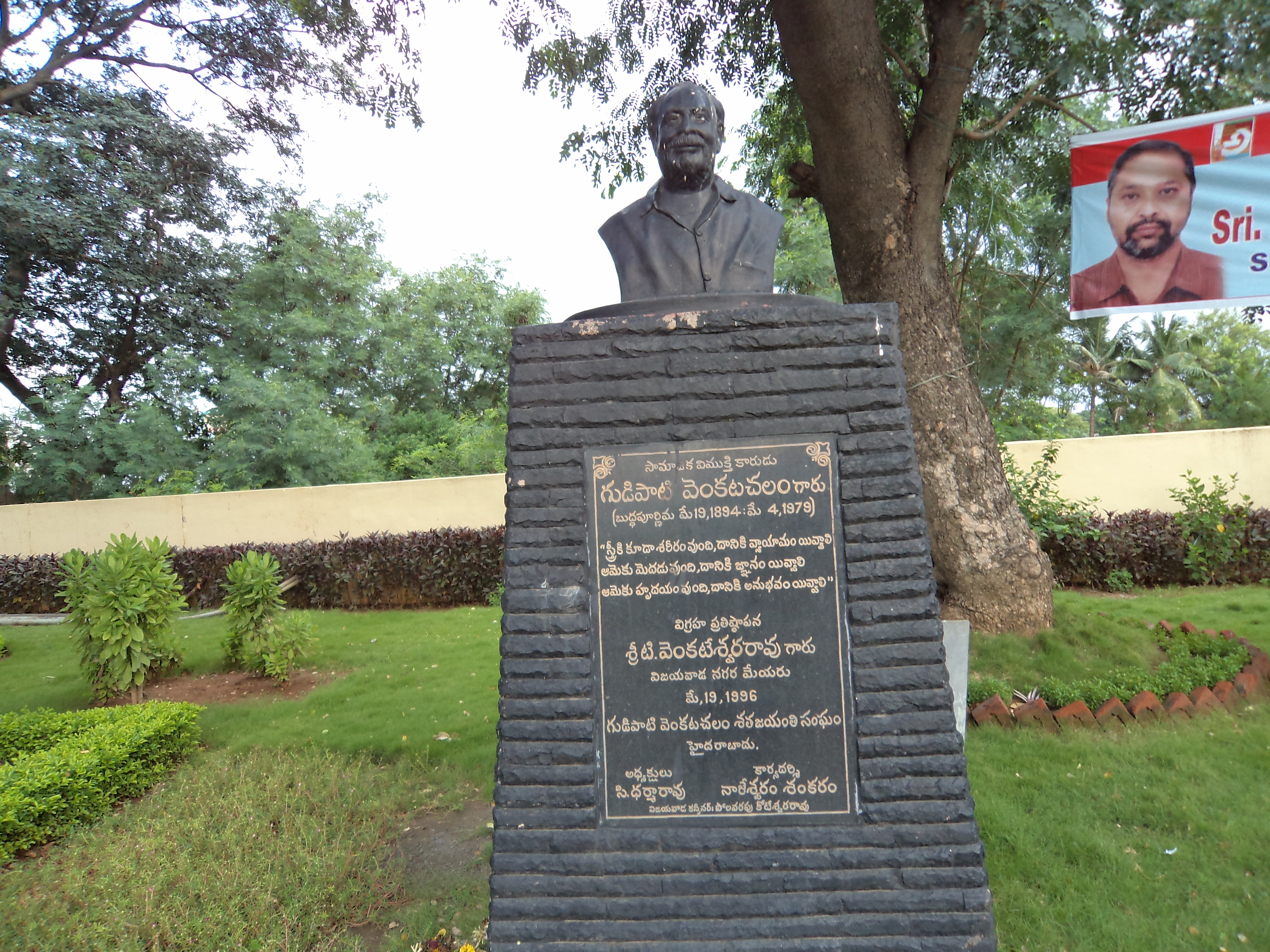
- Born: Gudipati Venkata Chalam; 19 May 1894; Valluripalem, Krishna district, Madras Presidency (present-day Andhra Pradesh, India)
- Died: 4 May 1979 (aged 84); Arunachala, India
- Years active: 1920–1972

Gudipati Venkatachalam (1894–1979), popularly known as Chalam, was an Indian Telugu-language writer and philosopher. He was considered to be one of the most influential personalities in modern Telugu literature.

Most of Chalam's work was regarding women, especially the kind of difficulties women encountered in the society, both physical and psychological. Chalam's work discussed how he believed women should face these problems. His writing had a distinctive style which would earn him an enviable place in the Telugu literary world.

Chalam's writings have been celebrated by his contemporaries, and are a growing influence among writers of the current generation as well.

== Life ==
Much that is known about Chalam's childhood comes from his 1972 autobiography titled Chalam. In it, he vividly mentions how he suffered beatings from his father and how his mother, residing at her parents’ home (in Tenali) even after getting married and starting a family with her husband, who belongs to Valluripalem of Krishna district, had to face a flurry of insults. Chalam brazenly puts across why he wrote his autobiography in its foreword:

"I hate autobiographies. By writing an autobiography, I am admitting to myself and indirectly telling everybody that I am an important person, I made lots of good things to help people and society and if I do not tell the world about myself, there is great loss to the world and by not knowing about me, the world is losing something. For a person like me who always thinks and wonders, "Why was I born? And OK, I was born but why I did not die immediately without polluting my surroundings? Writing an autobiography and telling my story shamelessly is not a matter to be excused [...]"

=== Birth and childhood ===
Gudipati Venkata Chalam was born on 18 May 1894, in Krishna district, India. His mother was Venkata Subbamma and his father was Kommuri Sambasivarao. He was mainly raised in Tenali after his maternal grandfather adopted him and changed his surname from "Kommuri" to "Gudipati". He was an avid practitioner of Hindu rituals and committed himself to an exhaustive study of Hindu epics as well as Hindu doctrinal teachings. The way his father abused his mother made an indelible impression on his young mind. Besides this, the manner in which his sister "Ammanni" (Venkata Ramanamma, Dulla) was coerced into an arranged marriage also made him concentrate on the difficulties that women faced in society.

=== Education, marriage and employment ===
Chalam joined Pithapuram Maharaja College in 1911. At that time, he was attracted by the preachings of Raghupati Venkata Ratnam Naidu—a social reformer and the founder of Brahma Samaj in Andhra Pradesh. Chalam went to Chennai to study for his Bachelor of Arts degree. Before joining the college, he was married to Chitti Ranganayakamma. During his stay in Chennai, he got his wife admitted into a convent for her education and used to drop her at school on his bicycle. Chalam stopped wearing the sacred thread (Yagnopaveetham) and started incorporating non-vegetarian food into his diet (Brahmins were strict vegetarians). He mingled with members of all castes which infuriated his relatives and more so his father-in-law who banished him from entering his house. At the time, Chalam's wife's age was merely 13. When his mother-in-law died, Chalam and his friends were not allowed in his father-in-law's house for the funeral, and were served food outside.

After completing his studies in Madras, Chalam joined in a job as tutor in Kakinada and started participating in the Brahma Samaj activities. He worked as a teacher in Karimnagar then joined in a job with Teacher's Training College in Rajahmundry. He later became a school inspector. About his job, Chalam wrote in his famous book "Musings" (in Telugu language) (Page 72, 5th Print in 2005) as follows:

"I am a stone, slave of the government, school inspector and for the poor mice like teachers, I am the cat."

== Chalam's daughter ==
Chalam's daughter, Souris, a devotee of Ramana Maharshi, maintains an ashram at Bheemili, Visakhapatnam.

== Bibliography ==
=== Novels ===
- Maidanam
- Sasirekha
- Dyvamicchina bharya
- Jeevitadarsam
- Brahmanikam
- Vivaham
- Aruna
- Anusuya
- Ameena

=== Short story collections ===
- Jealousy
- Aa rathri
- Prema paryavasanam
- Satyam Sivam Sundaram
- Vedantam
- Doshagunam
- Maadiga ammayi
- maamagari maryada
- mukkaalupeeta
- mukthimaargam
- mosamchesindha
- yavvanavvanam
- rasaputhrulu
- raamabakthudu
- raavanadarshanam
- reddyrangamma
- lancham
- lakshimdevi
- lakshmiuthharam
- villytho snejam ela ayyindante?
- vaani-a-study
- vaallu naluguru
- vichitranaleeyam
- vithanthuvu
- vennelathotalu
- vendantham
- vontarithanam
- shamantakamanitho interview
- sheshamma
- saraswathee prasannam
- cinema saayam
- seethathalli
- seethayya
- sugandhi
- susheela
- stationpampu
- hamko mohabbath
- hampeekanyalu
- hathya vicharana
- harijana vidhyardhi
- harijana samasya
- hindhumusalmaan
- nakshatrakaanthi
- kamalaanehru samadhi vadda
- anusooya

=== Nonfiction ===
- Musings
- Papam
- Prema Lekhalu
- Stree
- Biddala Shikshana
- Ramanashram lo
- Bhagavan padalamundu Deewan
- Sri Bhagavadgitha
- Bhagawan Smruthulu
- Chinta Dikshithulu gariki
- ' ' (Chalam lekgalu)
- ' ' Atmakatha

The novel Maidanam made an indelible mark on the reader for its free and frank way of expression, the relationship between man and woman disregarding caste and creed.

== Philosophy ==
Chalam was a strong critic of the fundamental societal architecture of his time. He believed that the barriers created by the society precluded love and mutual understanding from human relationships.

In a society that believed in children being indebted to their parents, he proclaimed caring for and bringing up of children as the fundamental duty as parents.

He was widely shunned during his times especially for his advocacy of women's rights and his total rejection of the family system.

== Adaptations ==
His Short story Doshagunam was adapted as a Telugu movie Grahanam.

== Quotes ==
Some of the dialogues spoken by the protagonists in the novels and short stories of Chalam are often cited in the form of quotations. For example, the film Grahanam opens with a recitation of a quote "ఎదో ఒకటి నిజమనుకోకపోతే శాంతి లేదు" meaning "There is no scope for peace without agreeing on an ad-hoc truth". Although Chalam is not quoted in common parlance compared to how often dialogues from contemporary cinema popup in and outside the internet, there does exist a niche audience and readership that can recognize his quotations.

In his autobiography, he expresses his strong criticism on modern education system and the neo-imperial influence on the psyche of the education upper middleclass population during the 1950s.

ప్రస్తుతం పిల్ల ఎందుకు పుట్టిందంటే చదువుకోవడానికి. ఎందుకు చదువు కుంటుందంటే పెద్ద ఉద్యోగాలు సంపాయించడానికి. పెద్ద ఉద్యోగాలు ఎందుకు సంపాయిస్తుందంటే అమెరికా పోవడానికి. ఇప్పుడు ఇండియా దేశస్తులకి స్వర్గం ఏమిటంటే అమెరికా. చిన్న చిన్న ఉద్యోగాలకి గూడా పెద్ద పెద్ద డిగ్రీలు ఉంటేగాని మనుషులు పనికిరావడంలేదు. వీళ్ళు చేసే పన్లకి, ఆ చదువుకునే కాలేజి విద్యకి ఏమీ సంబంధం లేదు. అది ఉత్త నమ్మకం. అనవసరం, డాంబికం. అవి మనిషి అన్నవాణ్ణి ఇంత లావు ఉబ్బించేటట్టు చేస్తాయి ఆ డిగ్రీలు."
