= Ajit Andhare =

Indian businessperson

- Born: 11 July 1973 (age 53)
- Education: NIT Rourkela (Bachelor of Technology); Indian School of Business (MBA)
- Occupations: COO, Star Studio18

Ajit Andhare is an Indian businessman, who is chief operating officer at Star Studio18.

== Career ==
Andhare is the chief operating officer at Star Studio18 , the motion pictures business of JioStar India Private Limited.

== Early life and education ==
A mechanical engineer from National Institute of Technology Rourkela and an alumnus of Indian School of Business, he has worked at HUL & BBLIL, Brooke Bond Lipton, Hindustan Lever & founded Raghav Bhal’s Capital18 funded Colosceum Media

He is known for producing television programs such as MTV Roadies, MTV Splitsvilla, Jai Shri Krishna for Colors, Wheel Smart Shrimati for Unilever and the Master Chef India series for Star India.
