= Madala Ranga Rao =

Indian actor and producer

Madala Rangarao (25 May 1948 – 27 May 2018) was an Indian actor and producer primarily active in Telugu cinema. He is popularly known as Red Star by people and associated with Communist Party of India and Prajanatya Mandali.

== Early life and career ==
He was born in Mynampadu of Prakasam district. He is noted for Erra Cinema or revolutionary movies in Telugu film industry. Ranga Rao started his career with satirical Telugu film Chairman Chalamayya (1974). He started his own banner Navataram Pictures and produced and acted in movies like Yuvatharam Kadilindi (1980) and had received a Golden Nandi award from the then AP government for his production 'Yuvatharam Kadilindi. His much acclaimed film was Erra Mallelu (1981) which also introduced his son Madala Ravi as a Child Artist, Mahaprasthanam (1982), Praja Shakthi (1983), Veera Bhadrudu (1984), Swarajyam, Maro Kurukshetram and Erra Suryudu. He acted in films such as Erra Pavuralu. "My films do not spread the naxalite ideology. They are aimed at bringing about social change," he said. He has shown dark angles in politics and social issues in his films.

Best known for his left ideology based movies; Madala Ranga Rao had produced more than 12 films and acted in more than 65 films. He rose to stardom in the '80s with movies like 'Yuvatharam Kadilindi', 'Erra Mallelu', 'Swarajyam', 'Viplava Shankham', 'Erra Pavuralu', etc. He won two Nandi Awards.

== Death ==
Ranga Rao died in the early morning on Sunday 27 May 2018 in STAR Hospital Hyderabad, Telangana.

== Awards ==
Nandi Awards

- He won Nandi Award for Second Best Story Writer - Yuvatharam Kadilindi
- Second Best Feature Film - Silver - Yuvatharam Kadilindi
