= List of Urdu prose dastans =

This is a list of dāstāns and qissas (prose fiction) written in Urdu during the 18th and 19th centuries. The skeleton of the list is a reproduction of the list provided by Gyan Chand Jain in his study entitled Urdū kī nasrī dāstānen.

== 18th- and 19th-century Urdu dastans and qissas ==
- Nau tarz-i murassa' - Husain ‘Atā Khān Tahsīn
- Nau ā'īn-i hindī (Qissa-i Malik Mahmūd Gīti-Afroz) - Mihr Chand Khatrī
- Jazb-i ‘ishq - Shāh Husain Haqīqat
- Nau tarz-i murassa‘ - Muhammad Hādī a.k.a. Mirzā Mughal Ghāfil
- Ārā'ish-i mahfil (Qissa-i Hātim Tā'ī) - Haidar Bakhsh Haidarī
- Bāgh o Bahār (باغ و بہار) (Qissa-i Chahār Darwesh) - Mīr Amman
- Dāstān-i Amīr Hamza - Khalīl ‘Alī Khān Ashk
- Fasana ajaeeb - Rajab Ali Baig Suroor

== See also ==
- Urdu literature
- Dastangoi
- Dastan
