= Syed Sahil Agha =

Indian writer and storyteller (born 1982)

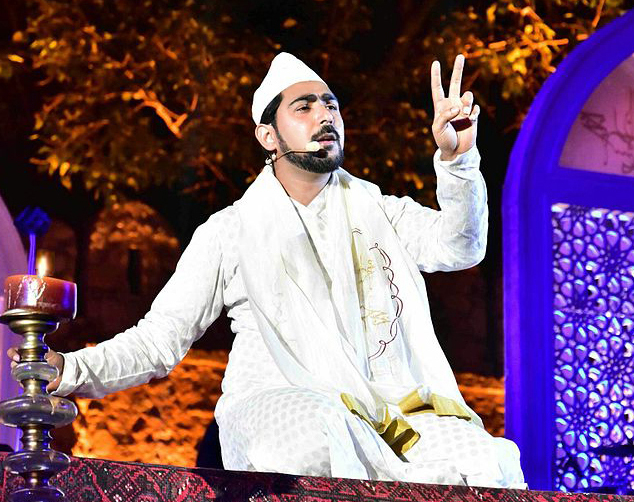
- Born: 1982 (age 43–44); Delhi
- Citizenship: Indian
- Education: National School of Drama; Bachelor of Arts (Jamia Millia Islamia); Diploma in Acting (Shri Ram Centre for Performing Arts)
- Years active: 2010-present
- Known for: Dastangoi

Syed Sahil Agha (born 1982) is an Indian storyteller, actor, writer and vintage car collector, who is specialised in the verbal art of Dastangoi, a 13th-century art of oral storytelling in Urdu language. He discovered the old form of QissaKhwani and revived it by naming it QissaGoi and also reintroduced Jumlebaazi, a 13th-century wit and Wordplay oral storytelling art form . He is known for his role as Shibli Nomani in the Sir Syed Ahmed Khan: The Messiah, a web-series released on Apple TV.

== Early life and education ==
Syed Sahil Agha was born in 1982 in Delhi to Sayyed Mansoor Agha, a writer and senior journalist. He belongs to the Delhi Gharana originated from Amir Khusrau's Silsila of Sufism.

He learnt and did his training at National School of Drama and he completed his Bachelor of Arts from Jamia Millia Islamia and then started to perform as a Dastango in events. Later, he did Post Graduate Diploma in Acting from Shri Ram Centre for Performing Arts, Delhi.

== Career ==
Agha gave his first professional Dastangoi performance in 2010 at Jamia Millia Islamia, Delhi, when he was pursuing Bachelor of Arts there. He claims his grandfather was the inspiration for his work.

He has also come up with a new idea of 'Musical Dastangoi' which has an amalgamated storytelling with Indian Opera and Indian classical music.

Agha is the writer of Dastan-e-Hind (2010), a collection of his dastans and Indian folklore, has inspired performances by many artists around the globe. He perform solo rather than as part of a pair. His dastans include Nairang-e DastanGoi, Dastan-e-Awadh, Dastan-e-Dard, Dastan-e-Taqseem, Dastan-e-Dastangoi,, Dastan Mehboob-e-Ilahi, Dastan-e-Amir Khusrau, Dastan-e-Shoaib Akhtar, Jashn-e-Javed Akhtar, Dastan-e-Chiragh, Dastan-e-Mahatma, Dastan-e-Vikram-Betal and Tughlaqnama, Dastan Dilli Ke Shayron ki which have become a hit amongst his audiences. His musical storytelling includes Dastan-e-Duvidha, Jashn-e-Virasat, Dilli Durbar, Dastan Ishq-e-Meera, Dastan-e-Sahir and many others.

He has been a part of Bharatmuni Rang Utsav, Gaatha: Mumbai International Story Telling Festival, Udaipur Tales International Storytelling Festival, Jahan-e-Khusrau, Shimla International Literature Festival, Sahityotsav Cultural Karvan, Jashn-e-Rekhta and Adbi Forum.

=== Vintage car collection ===
Agha, has been engaged in collecting vintage cars for 25 years. He has mainly collected models of British and German cars.

== Filmography ==
=== Television ===
Year	Show	Role	Channel	Ref
2018	Mirza Ghalib Umrao Begum	Writer	DD Urdu	
2019	Dastangoi	Writer and Performer	Zee Salaam	

=== Filmography ===
Year	Film	Role	Channel	Ref
2019	Pari Khana	Writer	Sood Films	
2020	Sanam Khana	Writer	Netflix	

== Awards and honours ==
In 2022, National Museum, New Delhi honoured Agha with The Grace of Dastangoi and also displayed his costume Angrakha at the Chitram Vastram.

- Pradesh Jouhar Award 2017
- Hafeez Merathi Award 2017
- Delhi Minorities Commission Award 2019
