= Udaipur Tales International Storytelling Festival =

Art Festival in India

- Nickname: Udaipur Tales
- Genre: Storytelling
- Location: Udaipur, Rajasthan
- Country: India
- Years active: 2017-till date
- Most recent: 10–12 January 2025
- Website: www.udaipurtales.com

Udaipur Tales International Storytelling Festival also known as Udaipur Tales is an India-based international storytelling festival. It was first held in February 2017 and is conducting its 8th edition in 2027. It was founded by the duo of Sushmita Singha and Salil Bhandari in 2017.

== History ==
=== Jumlebaazi ===
Syed Sahil Agha, a regular participant of the Festival had introduced and renewed a 13-century art of wit and wordplay known as Jumlebaazi, an Urdu-language art form known to be started by Amir Khusrau. It was re-introduced in 2020 at the Udaipur Festival.

The 6th edition of the festival was held from 10 to 12 January 2025, continuing its tradition of promoting oral storytelling. The event featured a revived 13th-century art form, “Jumlebaazi,” introduced by participant Syed Sahil Agha, alongside notable storytellers such as Devdutt Pattanaik and Mita Vashisht.

== Notable participants ==
- Devdutt Pattanaik
- Syed Sahil Agha
- Piyush Mishra
- Roohani Sisters
- Mita Vashisht
- Ahmad Faraz
- Qutbi Brothers
- Makarand Deshpande
