= Roohi =

Roohi may refer to:

- Roohi (1981 film), an Indian Hindi-language film by S.U. Syed
- Roohi (2021 film), an Indian Hindi-language comedy horror film by Hardik Mehta
- Roohi Bano (1951–2019), Pakistani actress
- Roohi Zuberi (born 1959), Indian women's rights activist

== See also ==
- Rooh, Indian TV series
- Rooh Afza, Indian fruit drink
- Roohani Sisters, Indian singers
