= Duncan Forbes (linguist) =

Scottish linguist (1798–1868)

Duncan Forbes (28 April 1798 – 17 August 1868) was a Scottish linguist and orientalist.

== Biography ==
Forbes was born in Kinnaird, Perthshire and was brought up by his grandfather from the age of three after his parents and younger brother emigrated to the United States. Illiterate until 13, he showed no early signs of linguistic ability but despite this late start, at age 17 he was appointed schoolmaster of the village of Stralock.

Shortly after this he attended Kirkmichael school followed by Perth Grammar School and the University of St. Andrews, gaining a master's degree from the latter.

In 1823 he took a post at Calcutta Academy, but because of poor health he was forced to return to Europe in 1826. In 1837 he became professor of Oriental languages at King's College London and stayed at this post until his retirement in 1861. During his time at King's College London he also worked at the British Museum, cataloguing the collection of Persian manuscripts.

During his lifetime he wrote a number of books and it is for these that he is most remembered. He had a hand in translating or editing a number of books in Urdu, Persian and Arabic, including a translation of Mir Amman's Urdu Bagh o Bahar, or Tales of the Four Darweshes, (which is itself a translation from the Persian of Amir Khusro), and of the Persian Adventures of Hatim Tai.

== Selected works ==
- Duncan Forbes (1863). A grammar of the Arabic language: intended more especially for the use of young men preparing for the East India Civil Service, and also for the use of self-instructing students in general. W.H. Allen. p. 344.
- Duncan Forbes (1863). A grammar of the Arabic language. Allen.
- Duncan Forbes (1874). A grammar of the Arabic language: intended more especially for the use of young men preparing for the East India civil service; and also for the use of self-instructing students in general. W.H. Allen. p. 344.
- Duncan Forbes (1868). A grammar of the Arabic language: intended more especially for the use of young men preparing for the East India Civil Service, and also for the use of self-instructing students in general. Wm. H. Allen. p. 344.
- Duncan Forbes; Edward Vernon Schalch; George Sale (1864). Arabic reading lessons: consisting of easy extracts from the best authors, together with a vocabulary of all the words occurring in the text : also some explanatory annotations, etc. Wm. H. Allen. p. 231.
- Duncan Forbes; S. Arnot Schalch (1828). A new Persian grammar. London Oriental Institute. p. 77.
- Adventures of Hatim Tai (1830 translation)
- The Hindustani Manual (1845)
- Bagh-O-Bahar (The Tale of the Four Dervishes) by Mir Amman. London: Wm. H. Allen, 1857 - English translation of Mir Amman's Urdu translation of the Persian original
- A History of Chess (1860)
- The Bengali Reader (1862)
- Arabic Reading Lessons (1864)

== See also ==
- Cox–Forbes theory
