= The Golden-Haired Children =

Turkish fairy tale

The Golden-Haired Children is a Turkish fairy tale collected by folklorist Ignác Kúnos. It is related to the theme of the Calumniated Wife and is classified in the Aarne-Thompson-Uther Index as tale type ATU 707, "The Three Golden Children".

These tales refer to stories where a girl promises a king she will bear a child or children with wonderful attributes, but her jealous relatives or the king's wives plot against the babies and their mother. According to scholars, despite the same classification as a form more commonly found across Europe, the tale and variants collected in Turkey differ in regards to the object of the quest: in the Turkish tales, the protagonists search for a beautiful maiden instead of a talking bird.

== Sources ==
The tale was first translated into Hungarian by Kúnos with the title Az aranyhajú gyermekek. It was later translated into German as Die goldhaarigen Kinder.

== Summary ==
In a kingdom, long ago, a woodcutter's three daughters work with sewing and stitching from morning till night, selling their work in the marketplace. One day, however, the padishah of the city bans lighting candles at night, for a period of three days and three nights. The sisters, trying to earn their living, continue their activities by candlelight and cover their house with a thick curtain.

On the third night, the padishah decides to check if his people are following the ban. He passes by the house of the three sisters, who are talking among themselves: the eldest wants to marry the royal cook to eat delicious dishes, and claims she can weave a large carpet for the padishah; the middle one the keeper of the royal wardrobe so she can wear fine clothes and claims can weave a large tent for the padishah, and the third sister to the padishah himself, for she promises to bear him twins with golden hair: the male with the symbol of a half-moon on the front, and the female with a bright star on the temples.

The padishah brings the first two sisters to prove their extraordinary claims to him, they fail, and are sent back to their poor house. The youngest sister marries him. The two sister stop by the palace gates and bribe an old woman ("the devil's own daughter") to interfere with the birth of their nephews.

The third sister gives birth to their wonder children with the astronomical birthmarks, "that darkness was turned to light when they were by". The old woman steals the babies, replace them for pups and casts the pair into a stream. They are washed away to another region. Meanwhile, an old man grazes with his she-goat, which returns milkless. The man notices and follows the she-goat, which leads him to the twins. The man takes them to his wife and adopts both as their children.

Years pass and the old couple dies. The girl spends her days at home while her brother goes hunting. One day, the boy, now a youth, meets the padishah on a hunt. The padishah feels an unexplained longing to embrace the boy as his son. He returns to the palace, growing ill with longing, and the old woman notices. She goes to the old couple's house and talks to the girl. The old woman convinces her to send her brother for the garden of the Queen of the Peris (Die Feekönigin or The Fairy Queen, in other translations) and find a branch.

The boy goes on the quest and meets the Mother of Devils, who advises him on how to get the branch. He finds the branch (a twig with little leaves, each leave with a little bird singing a song) and brings it home.

Seeing the boy's first success, the old woman returns and tells the girl of the Queen's magic mirror. He finds the Mother of Devils again and she tells him on how to enter the palace and get the mirror: he shall find two doors - open the closed one and shut the open one; he shall find a lion and a sheep - put the correct fodder in front of them; he shall find two furnaces - put out the burning one and heat up the furnace with ashes. The Boy follows the instructions, passes the garden and enters the palace. He steals the mirror, and a "mighty voice" alerts the Queen of the Peris. The Queen commands the furnaces, the animals and the doors to impede his escape, but since the boy has been kind to them, the objects and animals disobey their mistress.

The boy returns with the mirror. The old woman returns to the humble house and tells the girl to have the Queen of the Peris herself. The brother returns to the Mother of Devils, who tells him to cross a desert, pass by a large cypress wood with a tomb housing the petrified bodies of those who failed, go to her palace and shout at the top of his lungs for the Queen of the Peris. The boy follows her instructions, but the Queen of the Peris is victorious and petrifies the boy with her magic powers. However, the Queen takes pity on the boy, gets a saucer, fills with "diamond water" and sprinkles it on the boy, restoring him to life. The boy tells her he came to seek her, and she consents to return with him from "the Country of the Peris". The boy also convinces her to restore the petrified men in the tomb.

After his return, the boy marries the Queen of the Peris. She tells him the will find the padishah on his hunt and that he will invite the boy to his palace, but he should decline this invitation. It happens as she predicts. The next day, the Queen summons her Black lala and commands him to fetch her father's steed and give to her human husband, so that he can go to the palace and invite the padishah this time.

Meanwhile, the Queen of the Peris rescues her mother-in-law from her cruel punishment (being half-buried in the ground) and commands the house to be transformed into a palace. The padishah pays them a visit, sees the brother and the sister, the Queen of the Peris and his wife, and learns of the whole truth.

== Analysis ==
=== Tale type ===
Folklorists and tale collectors Wolfram Eberhard and Pertev Naili Boratav listed 41 variants in their joint work (Catalogue of Turkish Folktales), grouped under the banner Die Schöne or Güzel ("The Beautiful"), numbered 239 in the Typen Turkischer Volksmärchen (TTV). (Note: Some publications use the initials EB or EbBo to refer to their catalogue.) Turkish type TTV 239 corresponds, in the international Aarne-Thompson-Uther Index, to tale type ATU 707, "The Three Golden Children". As such, the tale was one of "the most frequent folktales" in Turkish sources. A further study lists at least 55 versions of the story, with other ten variants collected and archived in Uysal–Walker Archive of Turkish Oral Narrative.

=== Motifs ===
==== Quest for the supernatural maiden ====
Part of the Turkish variants show two heroes and follow the Brother Quests for a Bride format: the aunts' helper (witch, maid, midwife, slave) suggests her brother brings home a woman of renowned beauty, who becomes his wife at the end of the story and, due to her supernatural powers, acquits her mother-in-law of any perceived wrongdoing in the king's eyes. In some variants, the maiden (named Gülükan or Dilaremcengi) accompanies the Brother; in others, a male character joins the twins and reveals the whole truth.

In some of the Turkish variants, the name of the character may be Dilâlem-çengi, Dilâver-çengi, Dilâzar-çengi, Cengiz-Daughter, Çenginar. Regarding a tale he published, orientalist Otto Spies explained that the word Çengi means "female dancer", and dilaver "brave, valiant".

== Variants ==
=== Dilrukesch ===
Kúnos published another Turkish tale which he titled Tündér-Dilrukes és a királyfi ("Fairy-Dilrukesh and the Prince"). Turkologist Georg Jacob later translated it to German with the title Dilrukesch. In this tale, three poor sisters live next to a dew and earn their living by spinning. One day, however, the king issues a proclamation and forbids lighting a candle at night. The three girls despair at the fact, and arrange for them to keep working by putting on heavy drapes to cover their illumniated house. The three poor spinner sisters disobey the ban and keep working by candlelight for three nights. The king goes to their house to investigate and listens to their conversation: the elder sister wants to marry the king's cook to eat the best dishes, the middle sister the king's dressmaker to wear the finest garments, and the youngest the king himself, for she will bear him children whose smiles will produce rosebuds and whose tears will produce pearls. The king marries the youngest, to the elder sisters' jealousy, and she bears twins, a boy and a girl. The elder sister and the midwife replace them for puppies and cast them in the water, but they are saved by the king's gardener. Learning of their survival, the midwife convinces the gardener's wife to abandon the twins in a cave the woods. A doe suckles the twins and they grow up. The boy sells the pearls his sister produces with her tears. One day, the midwife goes to the cave and tells the girl about the thistle (German: Distel) of a woman named Dilrukesch Hanym, her mirror that reflects the whole world, and lastly about Dilrukesch herself. The boy brings the objects to the cave and marries Dilrukesch, daughter of the Peri king. Dilrukesch reveals the truth during a banquet with the king.

=== Dilalem's Fairy Garden ===
Kunós collected another Turkish tale which he titled Dilalem tündérkertje ("Dilalem's Fairy Garden"). In this tale, a padishah walks at night with his retinue when they sight a candlelit house in the distance. They approach the house and overhear the conversation between three sisters: the elder two say they can cook extravagant meals to feed the padishah's army, and the youngest promises to bear him children. The padishah returns the next day, takes the girls to the palace and marries the youngest. After nine months, a boy is born to third sister, just as she promised, but the elder sisters replace him for a puppy and throw him in the water. He is found and raised by a shepherd and is mocked by his peers for being a foundling. Some time later, he goes to the padishah's city and buys a castle as his house, then goes to meet the padishah on some hunts. Afraid of the boy revealing the truth, the elder sisters bribe a koja to trick the boy into going on dangerous quests: first, for a magic cluster of pearls that belongs in the garden of maiden Dilalem, and next for Dilalem herself. The boy gets the cluster and returns to fetch the maiden, being warned about her petrifying powers. He rides his horse to Dilalem's tower in her garden and shouts at her three times, but, since she is still in her forty day sleeping cycle, she does not answer. The boy becomes stone. After Dilalem wakes up from her slumber, she sees the statue of the boy and, falling in love with him, sprinkles some water to revive him. Dilalem and the boy return to the padishah's realm and she reveals the whole truth.

=== The Cobbler's Daughters ===
Turkologist Ignác Kúnos published a tale titled Äскіџі кызы (Turkish: Eskici Kızı; English: "The Cobbler's Daughters"), in the 8th volume of Vasily Radlov's Proben der volkslitteratur der türkischen stämme. Johannes Østrup summarized it with the title Pjaltekræmmersken. In this tale, the sultan bans lighting candles at night. He goes with the vizir to check on the only house that is still illuminated, and listens to the conversation between three sisters: the youngest says she wants to marry the sultan and bear him twins, a boy and a girl with teeth of pearl and golden hair. Years later, a witch sends the boy on a quest for a sewing needle, a magic mirror and a fairy woman named Bilal.

=== Cengidilaver ===
In the tale Cengidilaver, the tale begins with the sultan's queen giving birth to twin children, a boy and a girl, who are replaced for puppies and cast into the water by another woman that lived in the sultan's palace. The sultana is condemned by her husband to be buried in the ground up to the neck, and her children are saved by a poor miller. Sixteen years pass, and after the miller dies, the twin children, now homeless, wander around, until the sister finds some stones on the ground and picks them up. They meet a jeweler and ask for shelter. The jeweler adopts them and they live together with money from the stones. One day, the sultan's second wife sends the brother on a quest for the rosebush and the nightingale of a man being Cengidilaver, and finally for the man himself. The third time the brother visits Cengidilaver, he disenchants the creature. In return, Cengidilaver, now a normal man, thanks the brother and gives him the former sultana's golden ring, advising him to invite the king for dinner with the twins. This tale was originally collected by German orientalist Otto Spies with the title Die goldhaarigen Zwillingskinder ("The Twin Children With Golden Hair").

=== Tschan-Kuschu, Tschor-Kuschu ===
In a tale collected by folklorist Pertev Boratav from his own mother with the title "Чан-Кушу, Чор-Кушу" ("Tschan-Kuschu, Tschor-Kuschu", Turkish: Çan-Kuşu, Çor-Kuşu), the padishah forbids using candles at night. One house still does and he goes to investigate: he sees three sisters talking, the two oldest boasting they can weave a large tent and cloth, and the youngest promising to bear twins, boy and girl, with golden curls. The padishah marries the first two, who fail to deliver their boasts, and finally the youngest. She bears him the twins, who are replaced by the midwife. They are found and reared by a dervish. One day, the padishah sees the pair in the mountains and sighs that they could have been his children. The midwife and the sisters plan to eliminate the twins by sending them after "a thing that dances and plays". He is to go to another country, near a palace, knock on the door with a jasmine twig and answer "Chan-Kushu", while a voice on the other side cries out: "Chor-Kushu". The Brother fails in this repartee, and his Sister comes to rescue him: She knocks on the door with the jasmine twig. An arap appears; she beats him into submission and commands him to disenchant her Brother and everyone else. The "arap" accompanies the twins and is the one to reveal the intrigue to their father, and is relieved of his duty afterwards.

=== The Padishah and the Three Girls ===
In another tale, collected from the Turkish population of Vidin with the title "Падишах и три девушки" ("The Padishah and the Three Girls"), a padishah forbids lighting any light at night. Three orphans girls disobey the ban, since they have to work overnight to earn their living. Meanwhile, the padishah himself is listening to their conversation about their wishes to marry the padishah: the elder sister promises to weave a carpet large enough for the army and the people to sit, and there would still be room left; the middle one that she can prepare a cauldron of pilava to feed the army and the people, and there would still be half cauldron left; and the youngest promises to bear twins, a boy with a moon on the front and a girl with the sun. The padishah marries the first sister and, after three months, orders her to fulfill her boast. She fails and is banished to the goose barn. The marries the next sister and, after another three months, orders her to prepare the cauldron of food. She also fails and joins her sisters. Finally, the ruler marries the third sister and she bears the twins the promises after nine months. Learning of their cadette's luck, the sisters bribe the midwife to replace the babies for puppies and cast them in the sea. Thinking his wife lied about her children, the padishah orders her to be buried at a crossroads and spat on. Meanwhile, the twins are saved and raised by a dervish. On his deathbed, the dervish gives a magical ring, whip, cap and sheepskin to the male twin. After he dies, the male twin uses the ring to summon an Arab servant, who takes them to the padishah's city, where They rent a house. Their jealous aunts learn of this and ask the midwife for come up with a plan. The midwife pays the twins a visit and each time tells them about a treasure they have to seek: a white poplar tree whose leaves ring and play music, a bird that chirps, and their owner, a woman named Naylanim. On his quest to find Naylanim, the male twin helps a nest of birds, and their father, the bird Zumranka, gives him some of its feathers. The male twin reaches Naylanim's tower, and she curses him to be turned to stone every time she shouts from her tower. The male twin uses the Zumranka's feather to restore himself. Defeated, Naylanim joins the male twin and they make their way to the padishah's city. Naylanim convinces the youth to prepare a wedding and invite the padishah and everyone. During dinner, Naylanim shows the twins' astral birthmarks to their father, the padishah.

=== The Sun Girl ===
In a tale collected by folklorist Naki Tezel with the title Güneş Kızı ("The Sun Girl"), a rich man's two elder sons are already married, the first to a vizier's daughter, the second to a poor girl, but the youngest declares he does not wish to marry. One day, he takes his horse to the fountain, and overhears the conversation between three sisters: the elder two want to marry to have a comfortable life, while their cadette says that being mother to a boy and a girl with silken hair and teeth of pearl would make her happy. The third son goes back home and says he found his fiancée: the shepherd's third daughter. Both their families consent to their marriage, and the shepherd's daughter tells she wants her sisters to live with them. The girl's husband reminds her of her words at the fountain, and expects her to give birth to her promised children. Nine months later, she gives birth to twins, a boy and a girl. However, the girl's elder sisters, envying her happiness, bribe a midwife to replace the babies for puppies and cast them in the water. The girl's husband, tricked by the sisters-in-law's deception, and orders his wife to be buried in the crossroads up to the torso and to be spat on by the people. Meanwhile, at a distance, a shepherd is grazing his sheep and notices one of them has lost milk from its udders, and investigates the next day: the same sheep has found the twins near the river and has been suckling them. The shepherd takes the twins to raise as his own with his wife. Years later, when the twins grow up, they decide to leave their adoptive parents' house and buy another house for themselves in another place. They settle into a routine: the female twin stays at home while the male twin hunts game. One day, he hunts an agile deer and gives a carcass to a hunting retinue and their leader, his father. The man goes back home and comments how he saw a youth with silken hair and teeth of pearl, to the sisters-in-law's horror. The twins' aunts hire a sorceress to get rid of the twins: while the male twin is away, the sorceress pays a visit to the female twin, and first talks about castor leaves from a tree in Kafdag that produce sounds like instruments; then about the Sun Girl in the Indian land. With the help of a magic snow-white horse, he gets the leaves, and is warned by a dev-mother that the Sun Girl's land is filled with stones - people who tried and failed to get her. Despite the danger, the youth soldiers on: he is to dig a trench on the ground, fill it with water and wait for the coming of 39 pigeons that will become maidens, and a 40th one that is the Sun Girl; he is to steal her clothes. Failing twice, but being saved by the dev-mother, he gets the Sun Girl, undoes the stone curse on her victims, and brings the maiden to his house. After a while, his hunter father meets the youth again and invites him to the coffee house for a drink. After the meeting, the Sun Girl advises the twins to meet their mother at the crossroads, caress and wash her face, then at dinner with the twins' father, reveals the whole truth.

=== Çember Has Güzel ===
In a tale collected from Sivas with the title Çember Has Güzel, a man has three daughters. One day, they begin to talk among themselves about marrying the padishah: the elder boasts she can weave a rug for the whole army to sit, and half would still be left over; the middle one that she can sew a tent large enough to house the entire army and there would still be space left; and the youngest promises to bear him twins, a boy with golden hair and a girl with silver hair. The padishah, who has been listening to their conversation, the next day orders his vizier to send for the girls so he can marry all three. Time passes, and the padishah questions the two elder sisters about their promises, who try to defend themselves by saying that much time has passed; while the youngest asks him to wait nine months for the twins' birth. And so it happens: a boy and a girl are born to the third sister, while the elders become greatly concerned about their fate and consult with a sorceress. She tells them to take the children and replace them for puppies. The third sisters is banishes form the palace. Years pass, and the padishah happen to meet the twins by chance during a walk and tell his co-wives about it. They return to the old woman, who takes the children and hides them in a cave up the mountains, but this still leads to a chance encounter between father and children. The old woman, urged by the sisters to get rid of them, pays a visit to the twins' cave dwelling and tells the female twin about wonders: first, about a saz guarded by a seven-headed giant; later, about a magical maiden named Çember Has Güzel. He gets the saz first, then rides to find the maiden, and meets an old man on the road, who warns him that many have gone to her lands and turned to stone, and he may suffer the same fate. Undeterred, the youth marches on until he finds a basin next to a yellow stone, then shouts Çember Has Güzel's name three times, each time a part of his body becoming stone. After the third time, he resists the spell and Çember Has Güzel comes out of the rock to greet him, and goes back with him to his sister's cave. At the end of the tale, the padishah pays a visit to the twins in the cave, and invites them for a meal at the palace. During the banquet, Çember Has Güzel tries to feed a dead rooster a bit of rice, and is questioned by the padishah. She retorts it is strange for a dead rooster to eat rice, and so it is a human woman giving birth to puppies. With this, the maiden tells the monarch the twins are his children.

=== Three Sisters ===
In a Turkish tale from Çukurova with the title Üç Bacı ("Three Sisters"), a padishah marries three sisters after they promise great feats, the youngest promising to bear twins, a boy and a girl with hair half of gold and half of silver. The elder sisters fail to deliver, while the youngest gives birth to her children, which are taken from her by her jealous sisters and replaced for puppies. Tricked into thinking his third wife lies to him, he orders her to he placed at a crossroads with the dogs at her side, and for everyone to spit on her, on penalty of physical punishment to those that disobey the order. The children are saved and grow up together. One day, the elder sisters notice that their nephews are alive and send a sorceress to their house. The sorceress pays a visit to the female twin when the male twin is away and tells her about a fairy maiden named Nurşen Hanım and her possessions: her fishes, a light source, her gazelle and her grayhound. The male twin goes after the maiden's objects and lastly for the fairy, who has petrifying powers. The youth succeeds in his quest and brings everything to their home. Nurşen Hanım marries the male twin and reveals the truth to the padishah.

=== Zülfü Mavi ===
In a Turkish tale titled Zülfü Mavi, a sultan has three daughters, and each of them wishes to marry the sons of another sultan. The elder wants to marry the elder son, and boasts she can weave a carpet large enough for the people to seat, and there would be space left. The sultan's elder son overhears it and takes her for his wife. Next, the middle sister boasts she can cook food for the whole people in eggshells, and there would be food left. The middle son overhears it and takes her as his wife. Lastly, the youngest sister promises to bear twins, a girl with silver hair and teeth of pearl, and a boy with silver hair and teeth of gold. The sultan's youngest son marries her. However, marital life is not an easy one: the second sultan's elder sons questions their respective wives about their boasts, and the girls dismiss their husbands' concerns, while their cadette does give birth to her promised twins, to their jealousy. They hire a witch to take the children and abandon them in the wilderness, and replace them for puppies. The sultan's youngest son falls for the deception and banishes his wife at a crossroads. Meanwhile, the children are found by a shepherd near a bush when he notices that one of his she-goats has its udders drained of its milk. The shepherd takes the twins and raises them with his wife, and, whenever they wash them, their bathwater turns to gold, which they sell. After becoming rich enough, they build a house in the mountains, and the twins fall into a routine: the female twin stays home, while the male twin goes hunting. After a while, their aunts realize the twins are alive, and send the witch to get rid of them. The witch pays a visit to the female twin and convinces her to find Zülfü Mavi that can play the strings on a saz and amuse her. The male twin rides a horse to Zülfü Mavi and shouts three times for them to come out, each time his body turning to stone. The third time, the spell dissipates, and the youth takes some water from a basin and sprinkles it on the stones, releasing Zülfü Mavi's previous victims. Zülfü Mavi goes with the youth to the twins' house, and later joins them for a banquet with the sultan, the twins' father. During the banquet, Zülfü Mavi orders a golden rooster to eat golden barley, and states the sight is just as strange as a human woman giving birth to animals.

=== Gülbahar and Gülbarin ===
In a Turkish tale collected by folklorist Muhsine Helimoğlu with the title Gülbahar ile Gülbarin ("Gülbahar and Gülbarin"), a sultan's son likes to disguise himself and mingle with the people. In the same kingdom, a poor woman lives with her three daughters and they work making pottery. One night, he passes by the three sisters and overhears their conversation regarding their marriage wishes to the sultan's son: the elder boasts she can weave a carpet with gold, the middle one that she can sew a shirt of pure gold, and the youngest promises to bear children with hair of gold and silver. The sultan's son sends for the trio and they are brought to their presence: the elder two dismiss their boasts as mere fancies, while the youngest marries him and, nine months later, she does give birth to her promised twins: a boy and a girl with golden and silver hair. The elder sisters, driven by jealousy, take the children and cast them in the water in a box, then replace the babies for two puppies. The sultan's son falls for their trick and orders his wife to be sewn inside a buffalo's hide, abandoned at the crossroads and spat on by the people. As for the children, they are rescued by a fisherman and his wife and given the names Mehmet (the boy) and Gülbahar (the girl). Whenever the fisherman's wife goes to bathe the babies, the water turns to gold and silver, which they use to become rich. Years later, Mehmet gets into a fight with some neighbouring boys, who mock him for being a foundling. The fisherman's wife confirms the story and the boy decides to depart with his sister, but leaves their adoptive parents some gold bathwater. The twins wander until they reach a desert, and the girl prays to God for a palace just as beautiful as the sultan's and next to it. Her prayers are answered and a palace appears. Mehmet spends his days hunting, while Gülbahar stays home. The jealous aunts learn of their survival and one of them, pretending to be an old woman wanting to pray, pays a visit to the twins' palace. She befriends the girl and convinces her to search for the flower Gülbarin. Mehmet goes to search the flower and finds an old man, who gives him some of its hairs and instructions on how to get the flowers: reach the garden and shout three times "Gulbarin", but paying attention to avoid being petrified. With his words, Mehmet takes a bouquet of the Gulbarin flowers and returns home. Next, the jealous aunts tells them to seek the owner of the flowers, Gulbarin herself. The boy makes the same path and brings Gulbarin with them. Gulbarin, who has magic powers, knows the truth about the twins and prevents the old lady from talking to Gulbahar ever again. She also tells Mehmet to bring flowers to the woman tied to the buffalo skin at the crossroads. It is done thus, and the woman says the flowers smell like her twins. Gulbarin explains to the twins the woman is their mother, who they take home with them. Later, Mehmet meets the sultan on a hunt, who invites him for a meal at the palace. Gulbarin warns the twins to bring a cat with them, so it may eat any poisoned food. This is confirmed with the cat's death. For a second meal, Mehmet takes off his ring and place it on the table next to his plate, telling the sultan his ring is eating the food for him. The sultan, his father, notices the absurdity of the situation, to which Mehmet replies that so is absurd for a woman to bear puppies. With this, the jealous aunts are punished, Mehmet marries Gulbarin, Gulbahar a vizier, and the family reunites.

=== Seven Gypsies ===
In a Turkish tale collected by folklorist Muhsine Helimoğlu with the title Yedi Çingene ("Seven Gypsies"), a sultan rules two countries and has a son in search of a wife. In the same land, seven gypsy girls set up their tents with their families, the first girl ugly and the seventh the most beautiful of the group. The girls learn the sultan's son is looking for a bride, and they comment what they will do if they marry him (pour water on his hands, bring him his shoes, etc.), and the youngest promises to bear him two golden children. The sultan's son, who was listening to their conversation, decides to marry each of them, and each of them fail to fulfill their wishes, since they simply wanted a husband, save for the youngest, who does bear him the twin gold children. The six gypsies take the seventh to give birth next to a chimney, through which the children fall. The gypsies cast the twins in the water and replace them for puppies to fool the sultan's son. The six gypsies suggest the seventh girl is to be left in at seven crossroads and for people to beat her with a piece of wood. As for the children, a poor fishing couple finds the children in the water and rescues them. Whenever water is poured over them, gold appears. The fisherman couple dies and leaves the twins all by themselves, the boy going on hunts and the girl staying at home. One day, the boy fails to hunt some partridges and complains it to a man, who is his true father and gives him some. The man returns home and tells the gypsies he met a "golden boy" on the road whom he considers as his son. The gypsies realize the children are alive; one of the gypsies disguises herself as an old woman on a pilgrimage, pays the female twin a visit and says their house is missing a nightingale. The male twin goes in search of the nightingale and meets a man on the road, who advises him to go to a certain hut and call out for the bird, but take care to not be petrified. Despite the man's warnings, the male twin becomes stone. The female twin senses something wrong with her brother and goes to the nightingale's hut. She cries for her brother's fate and the bird restores him and other stones back to life. The twins take the bird with them to their house. At the end of the tale, the nightingale suggests the twins invite people to a meal and place rocks to feed the guests' horses. The twins notice the strangeness of the request, and the bird explains the whole story to them. The twins then restore their mother and look for their father, who learns the truth and punishes the six gypsies.

=== The Golden-Fringed Children ===
In a Turkish tale from Van, collected from teller Hafize Kurşun with the title Altın Perçemli Çocuhlar ("The Golden-Fringed Children"), three princesses sigh that they are still single, and send three melons for their father, the sultan, as an analogy for their marriageability. The vizier interprets the message and explains it to the monarch. The girls are gathered in a garden, and a sultan's son listens to their conversation: the elder promises to bear a golden-haired boy, the middle one boasts she can weave carpets and fine tapestry for the king, and the youngest promises to bear golden-haired twins, a boy and a girl. The sultan's son confronts the princess about their boasts, which the elder two dismiss as mere words, while the youngest reiterates hers, if Allah wills it. In time, the sultan's son marries the third sister and she indeed becomes pregnant, giving birth to her promised twin children. The elder sisters pay an old woman with gold and she casts them in the water in a box, replacing their for puppies. The sultan's son banishes her to the crossroads and orders her to be given bread and water. A miller finds the box, rescues the children and raises them. The girl is called Gülizar and the boy Ahmet. The miller's biological son mocks them for being foundlings, which is confirmed by the miller. The twins leave home, but the miller gives them a horse to help them. They reach another city and find a house, Ahmet going to hunt while Gülizar stays home. The sultan's son, now a sultan, meets Ahmet during a hunt. The elder aunts realize the children are alive and sends the old woman to get rid of them. The old woman pays a visit to Gülizar and convinces her to quest for a fairy woman named Huri Gizi, who lives in Mount Kaf, as a companion for her (for the first quest); a fine dress that is located in a cave behind Mount Kaf (for the second quest); for a magic enchanted apple in the same cave (for the third quest), and for Hasan-i Bengiboz, which belongs to Huri Gizi in her garden and sings for seven days and seven nights. Ahmet brings every item his sister requests, and disenchants Hasan-i Bengiboz. Back home, the sultan takes the twins for a meal, but the meal is poisoned, so the twins invite the monarch to their house, where Gülizar reveals the whole story to their father. The sultan then goes to rescue his wife, who has been living in the wilderness with the two dogs, and executes his sisters-in-law.

=== Şemşi Gamer ===
In a Turkish tale collected by professor Necati Demir from an informant in the village of Kızılınnak district of Çankırı, with the title Şemşi Gamer, a padishah has three sons whom he wants to see married, but are reluctant to marry. While walking, they overhear the conversation between three sister: the elder wants to marry the padishah's elder son and boasts that she can sew a carpet that can hold the entire army on one side and still be crumpled on the other side; the middle one wants the middle prince and boasts that she can weave such a cloth or towel that soldiers can use to wipe their faces with one side and the other side would still be folded; and the youngest wants the padishah's youngest son and promises to bear twin children, a girl with pearly teeth and a boy with golden hair. The three princes marry the three girls, and the elder sisters rebuke their boasts, while the youngest becomes pregnant. They consult with an old witch to humiliate their cadette: as soon as the twins are born, the babies are replaced for a puppy and a kitten, then locked in a box and thrown in water. The youngest prince sees the little animals and goes mad, then throws his wife behind a door. As for the children, a miller rescues the box and raises them. Years later, on his deathbed, he gives them an apple and bids them use it to give them a palace. The twins reach their father's country and build a palace from the apple in front of the padishah's palace. Father and son unknowingly become close, while the twin sister stays at home. The elder aunts consult with the old witch how to get rid of them, and she herself visits the twins' palace. The witch tells the female twin about wonders she needs for her palace: first, to bring singing birds from a large tree in a forest behind the mountains; next, for the tree where the birds perch on; finally, for a bride for his brother, a beautiful maiden named Şemşi Gamer. With the help of an old man named Hizir Baba, the male twin fetches the birds and the tree, and goes for Semsi Gamer, who lives in a mansion with a garden of petrified people. The male twin falls in love with her beautiful face and long locks, and becomes stone when he tries to ride next to her mansion. Semsi Gamer decides to release the poor victims and restores them to life, then falls in love with the golden-haired youth and joins him. One day, the old witch tries to knock on the twins' door, and Semsi Gamer kicks her out and petrifies her, since she has prescient powers and knows everything. Later, the padishah's young son invites the twins to dinner at the palace, and Semsi Gamer advises her husband, the golden-haired youth, to give a spoonful of rice to the roasted rooster; the princes will be amused at the strange event and remark that a dead rooster cannot eat food, to which he is to reply so is a woman giving birth to a puppy and a kitten. It happens thus, and the third prince realizes the twins are his children and rescues his wife form behind the door, in a sorry and emaciated state. As the family reunites, the padishah asks his two daughters-in-law which they prefer: forty knives or forty mules. The duo answer they prefer forty horses to emphasize their status as members of the padishah's family, but they are tied to forty horses and let loose.

=== The Tale of Beauty Erdem ===
In a Turkish tale from Besni, first published in 1950, with the title Erdem Güzeli Masalı ("The Tale of Beauty Erdem"), an old woman has three daughters. One day, she dies. The three sisters talk together about their marriage plans with the sultan's son: the eldest boasts she can weave a rug so large where the men of the country can sit and there will be space left; the middle one that she can could a meal for the men of the country to eat, and there will be still food left, and the youngest promises to bear a boy with golden hair and a girl with golden hair. The sultan's son, who just happens to be passing by, overhears their conversation and decides to marry them. He ascends to the throne and becomes sultan, then sends for the eldest sister, bidding her to fulfill her boast. She dismisses her previous words. The sultan then takes the youngest sister, who reiterates her promise if Allah wills it. Six months later, she gives birth to her golden-haired twins, to the elder sisters' jealousy, who hire a witch to get rid of the twins and replace them for puppies. The sultan falls for deceit and orders his wife to be tied to a gate and for people to beat her. As for the children, the witch throws them in the water in front of the palace. An old man rescues the chest and raises the children, naming them Mehmed and Gülüzar (also written Gülizar and Gülzar), and feeds them with sheep's milk. When the old man dies, Gülüzar asks her brother to pick up five stones ("beşdaş", in the original) for them to play (which the collector explains is a game played in Besni); Mehmed fetches the stones and a horse comes out of the water. Mehmed mounts the horse and it swims across the water to a house near the water's edge, then the horse vanishes underwater. A woman in the house witnesses the event and brings the boy home, giving him food besides sheep's milk. Mehmed plays with the five stones, and the woman's husband notices they are diamonds, which Mehmed explains he found in front of the cave they lived before. The man asks Mehmed to bring more diamonds and his sister to them. The same horse comes out of the water and guides Mehmed to Gülüzar, whom he takes with him along some diamonds. The man becomes rich and raises the twins for two years. One day, Mehmed goes to the market with the five stones and sells them to a merchant for many thousands of liras.

With the large sum of money, Mehmed builds a house on the outskirts of the city and furnishes it with gold and carpets. The house becomes known across the city as the house of the golden-haired boy and girl, which reach the ears of their aunts. The aunts realize their nephew and niece are alive, and send a sorceress to get rid of them. The sorceress pays a visit to Gülzar and says she is all alone, and could use the flower from Erdem Güzeli to entertain her, whose bud her brother can bring. Gülüzar informs her brother of her interest in the flower, and he goes after it, mounted on the water horse he tamed before. He meets a friendly old man on the road, who teaches him a spell to counter Erdem Güzeli's petrification powers from her magic shirt. Mehmed does as instructed and steals a flower from her garden. Next, the sorceress returns; Gülüzar notices the flower does not react, and the sorceress suggests he should have brought Erdem Güzeli with him. Mehmed rides again on a quest and meets the same old man, who gives him some daffodils for him to use on Erdem Güzeli: she is to smell them, which will cause a horn to appear on her head, and become fascinated for its fragrance; Mehmed is to offer another smell, and ask for the magic shirt in return. It happens thus, and Mehmed obtains her shirt. People at her garden are restored to life from their stony states, and Mehmed lets Erdem Güzeli smell the flowers to remove the horn on her head. Erdem Gülizar asks for the shirt, at least in the name of his beloved one, and Mehmed says that she is the one he loves. He brings Erdem Güzeli with him, they marry and they live together with Gülüzar. Later, the sorceress tries to talk to Gülüzar again, but Erdem Güzeli expels her. Sometime later, the sultan is on a hunt with his retinue, and cannot seem to find any game. He meets Mehmed, however, and the two strike a friendship. He returns home and tells Gülüzar and Erdem Güzeli about it, and his wife advises him to invite the sultan for a meal the next time they meet. After a meal in the twins' house, the sultan invites them to his palace. When Erdem Güzeli hears this from Mehmed's mouth, she reveals the sultan is the twins' father, then relates their story. The trio mount their horses and ride to the palace. They pass by a woman tied to a gate whom a soldier says is to be hit with a mace. Erdem Güzeli forbids the twins from harming her, since she is their mother. The sultan arrives to greet the trio, and the servants ask what is the food for their horses. Erdem Güzeli says her horse eats stone and iron. The sultan questions the impossibility of this, to which Erdem Güzeli replies with a question, if a human can give birth to puppies. The sultan still does not understand, until Erdem Güzeli points to Mehmed and Gülüzar as his golden-haired twins. The sultan embraces his children, releases his wife from the punishment, and executes the other co-wives.

=== İdarem Cengiz Kızı ===
In a Turkish tale from Gaziantep with the title İdarem Cengiz Kızı, three poor sisters spin yarn to sell. One day, the eldest says she wants to marry the sultan's son, and boasts she would weave a carpet for the soldiers to sit on and there would be space left; the middle that that she would prepare a banquet for the people, and if they sat to eat, there would be room left; and the youngest promises to bear a golden-haired boy and a golden-haired girl. The sultan's son, who is passing by their house, overhears their conversation and decides to marry all three. He then bids the eldest to prove her claim, but she dismisses it as mere talk, which the middle sister also does. Lastly, he asks the youngest sister to prove her claims, and she reiterates her promise. She is pregnant, to the jealousy of the elder sisters. They instruct the midwife to tamper with the delivery of the twins: she gives birth to a pair of twins, but the midwife replaces them for kittens and casts them in water in a basket. A woodcutter finds the basket and raises the twins with his wife. Years pass, the woodcutter's wife dies and he falls ill, then reveals the truth to the twins on his deathbed that he found them, so they should follows the river upstream to find their biological parents. The woodcutter dies, the twins sell their house and go to the sultan's city, where they open a grocery shop and live in the upstairs room. Their aunts recognize the twins are alive and plan to get rid of them: they approach their niece and ask if the male twin is getting married. The girl says he will find one when the time is right, and the aunts suggest he seeks for wife a maiden named that lives on a certain mountain, Idarem Cengiz Kızı, and on the road he can bring the magical tree that plays and sings by itself. After they leave, the male twin comes home and his sister informs him of the maiden and the tree, and he decides to seek such a maiden. On the road, he meets an old man who warns him of the dangers of the quest and advises him to fetch a branch of the tree without looking back, lest he turns to stone; and he is to approach a well and call out for Idarem Cengiz Kızı once for her to answer, and call a second time, for she will command him to turn to stone on her third reply. The old man also gives him some water to pours into the well. The male twin passes by stones shaped like humans, leans over the well and calls for Idarem Cengiz Kızı. She replies and the male twin pours some water in the well. The boy calls for her again and drops some more water in the well, as Idarem Cengiz Kızı replies she is putting on her shoes. The male twin turns from the well, and Idarem Cengiz Kızı comes out of the well. She joins the male twin and both make a turn to his home, passing by the magical tree and uprooting it. The tree also sees everything and knows of the wicked deeds done to the twins. Back home, the male twin plants the tree, and learns his mother was buried in sand for giving birth to kittens. The aunts return to see the twins and plan something to eliminate them. However, Idarem Cengiz Kızı transforms one of the aunts into a pestle and the other into a broom. The sultan learns of his co-wives' disappearance and sends town criers to call out for the people. The male twin knows what happened to the sultan's wives. The sultan becomes very fond of him, unaware of their relationship. The female twin asks her brother to bring him in the evening. The male twin confronts the sultan about the woman buried in the sand, and the monarch says it was done to punish her. He then asks about his other wives, and the male twin invites the sultan to their grocery shop, where he will reveal their whereabouts. The sultan comes to the twins' house; the male twin places the pestle and the broom on the ground, which are restored to the co-wives' human forms. The boy asks the sultan to bring the woman buried in the sand. The three sisters are reunited, and the boy questions his aunts about their wicked deeds. They admit their treacherous actions done to their youngest sister and nephew. The sultan then asks his co-wives which they prefer: a ride on buffalo-mule's tale or a sharp sword. The elder sisters say they prefer the buffalo-mule; they are tied to its tail and are torn to pieces. The sultan is reunited with his twins and wife.

=== From the Uysal-Walker Archive ===
In a Turkish tale collected from a female teller from Malatya, in 1990, and archived in the Uysal–Walker Archive of Turkish Oral Narrative with the title The Abused Youngest Sister, three sisters wish to marry the padishah: the first claims she can make a huge meal for the padishah and his army, the second that she can sew a tent for the whole army and the third that she can bear a boy and a girl, one of them with golden hair and the other with silver hair. The elder sisters renege on theirs claims and try to humiliate their youngest before she gives birth. After she gives birth to three children, two boys and a girl in three consecutive pregnancies, the sisters replace them for a pup and two kittens and throw them in the river. Years later, the siblings are sent for a magic tree that talks and sings and belongs to a fairy woman anamed Ahelifim-Vahelifim, and lastly for the fairy woman herself.

In another Turkish variant from the Uysal-Walker Archive, collected from teller Gülşah Gülen from Kars Province in 1977 and titled The Persecuted Wife, the third sister promises to bear twins with golden hair and pearly teeth. The twins are raised by a couple of giants and given the names Şah Ǐsmail (the boy) and Mihriban (the girl). The aunts send them for the "saçlı fırak", the laughing rose (güllü kahkaha) and lastly for their owner, a woman named Güllüzar Hanım.

=== Other tales ===
French orientalist Albert Socin collected a Turkish tale from the city of Mardin. In this tale, the king forbids lighting any fire at night, and, the next evening, he wanders incognito through the streets of his kingdom, until he sights an illuminated house in the distance. The king goes to peer through the window and sees three sisters talking: the elder promises to weave a tent large enough to cover the whole army, the middle sisters that she can sew a carpet large enough for the whole army, and the youngest promises to give birth to a boy with locks of gold and silver. The king marries the first sister and asks her about the tent; she answers that the tent is the firmament itself. The king then marries the middle sister and asks her about the carpet; she answers that the carper is the ground itself. The king then marries the third sister, who does deliver the child she promised. The jealous sister take the boy and cast him into the sea in a box. He is saved by a fisherman and his wife; whenever the boy is bathed, the bathwater turns to gold.

== Adaptations ==
Author Hasan Latif Sarıyüce published a Turkish tale with the title Altın Oğlan ile Altın Kız ("Golden Boy and Golden Girl"): a sultan has a splendid garden with pools and flowers of every type. One day, he finds three birds perch and fly about the rosebush. The sultan becomes fascinated with the birds and enchanted by their voice, and wishes to learn the language of the birds. A wise servant tells the sultan to send for an expert dervish who lives in distant lands who can translate their language. It happens thus, and the dervish, a wise old man, is brought before him. The wise man reveals that the birds are not animals, but the daughters of the fairy king, who have fallen with the sultan, and translates their words: the eldest boasts she can weave a carpet so large for the army to sit on and there will be space left; the middle one that she can sew a tent so large to house the entire army, with room left, and the youngest promises to bear him twins, a golden boy and a golden girl whose beauty shames the sun and make the moon blush. The wise man also says that, if the sultan comes to the garden on a certain night on the fourteenth of the moon, he can capture the fairy girls and make them human forever. The sultan does as the wise man instructed and sees the three fairies in human form, then marries them. The third fairy wife gives birth to her promised radiant twins, to the elders' jealousy, so the sisters replace them for monkeys and casts them in river in a chest. The sisters trick their cadette that she gave birth to monkeys, and, since she is now human, she lost her powers. The sultan ties the third co-wife to a mule and banishes her to the forest. Back to the twins, a dervish finds the chest, rescues the twins and raises them. The dervish, on his deathbed, tells them he found them, and bids them investigate their origins. The golden boy tells his sister he will look for their parents, and leaves his sister home. After months and years, and long journeys, he returns home without an answer. On the road back, the boy goes to rest under a tree and sighs aloud "Of". A dwarf comes out of a tree and says that the boy summoned him, since his name is Of. The boy asks the dwarf about the identities of his father and mother: the dwarf says that the sultan is alive and enjoying a life of excess and indulgence at the palace, while their mother lives near them in a hut. The woman recognizes her son and is brought before her daughter. The twins are reunited with their mother. The boy then goes to the capital and asks around about the sultan: he is now holding parties under a dancing tree in the garden until dawn. The boy breaks into the garden and sees the sultan, the two co-wives and the court coming to party and make merry under the tree. At a certain point, the boy climbs onto the wall and admonishes the sultan for his lowly behaviour and for casting his wife out and leaving the golden boy and golden girl without parents. The dancing tree stops its music and the sultan wants to punish the boy, but he absconds. The same incident repeats twice more. On the third evening, after the boy escapes, the sultan's curiosity is piqued by the mention of the golden children, and realizes that they must capture the boy for him to know the truth, by sealing all entries to the city. The soldiers meet an innkeeper that mentions that a boy with golden face, hands and feet was a guest of his, but has left. The sultan follows the tracks of the golden boy to a town near a river, where he learns the boy lives. His soldiers surround the twins' hut and he recognizes the wife he banished. The sultan apologizes for casting her out and reunites with his children, then banishes the co-wives by tying them to forty mules. Now back with his family, he wonders about the utility of a golden carpet or a golden tent, and throws them out, then fells down the dancing tree.

== See also ==
- Zarlik and Munglik
