= Dastangoi =

Urdu oral storytelling art form

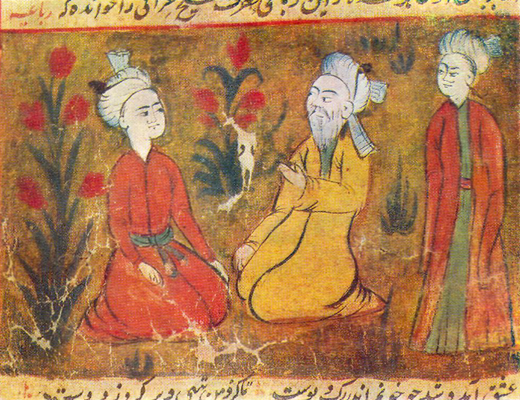
Amir Khusrow teaching his disciples

Dastangoi (Hindi: दास्तानगोई, romanized: dāstāngōī, Urdu: داستان گوئی, romanized: dāstān-gōī, Persian: داستان‌گویی, romanized: dāstān-gōyī) is a 13th century Urdu oral storytelling art form. The Persian style of dastan evolved in 16th century. One of the earliest references in print to dastangoi is a 19th-century text containing 46 volumes of the adventures of Amir Hamza titled Dastan e Amir Hamza.

The art form reached its zenith in the Indian subcontinent in the 19th century and is said to have died with the demise of Mir Baqir Ali in 1928. Dastangoi was revived by historian, author and director Mahmood Farooqui in 2005. Syed Sahil Agha amalgamated Dastangoi with music & singing in 2010.

At the centre of dastangoi is the dastango, or storyteller, whose voice is his main artistic tool in orally recreating the dastan or the story. Notable 19th-century dastangos included Amba Prasad Rasa, Mir Ahmad Ali Rampuri, Muhammad Amir Khan, Syed Husain Jah, and Ghulam Raza.

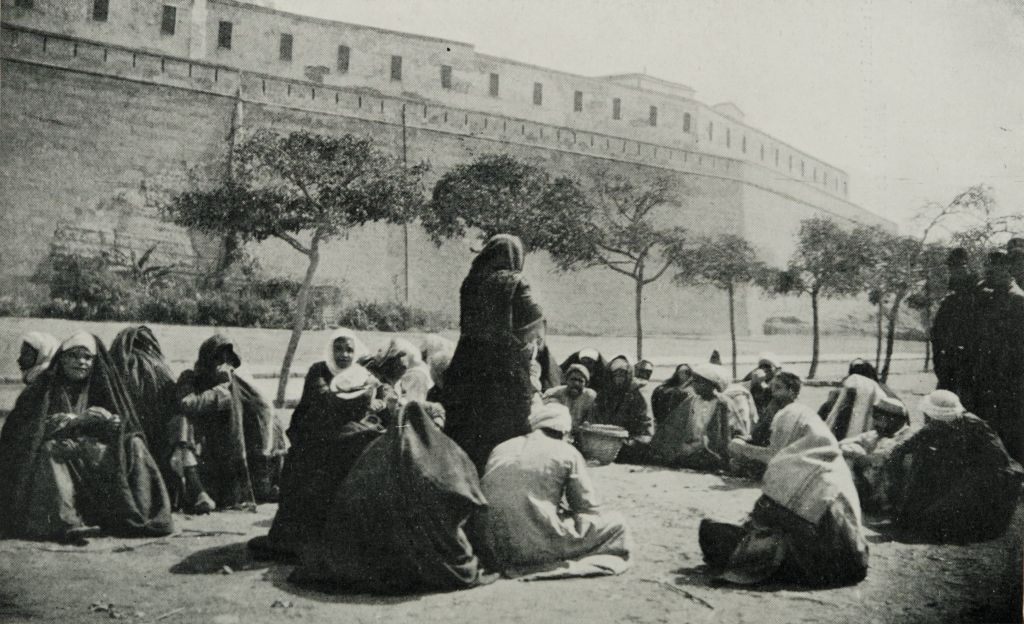
A female dastango standing and reciting from the "Arabian Nights" while the audience sits around her, 1911

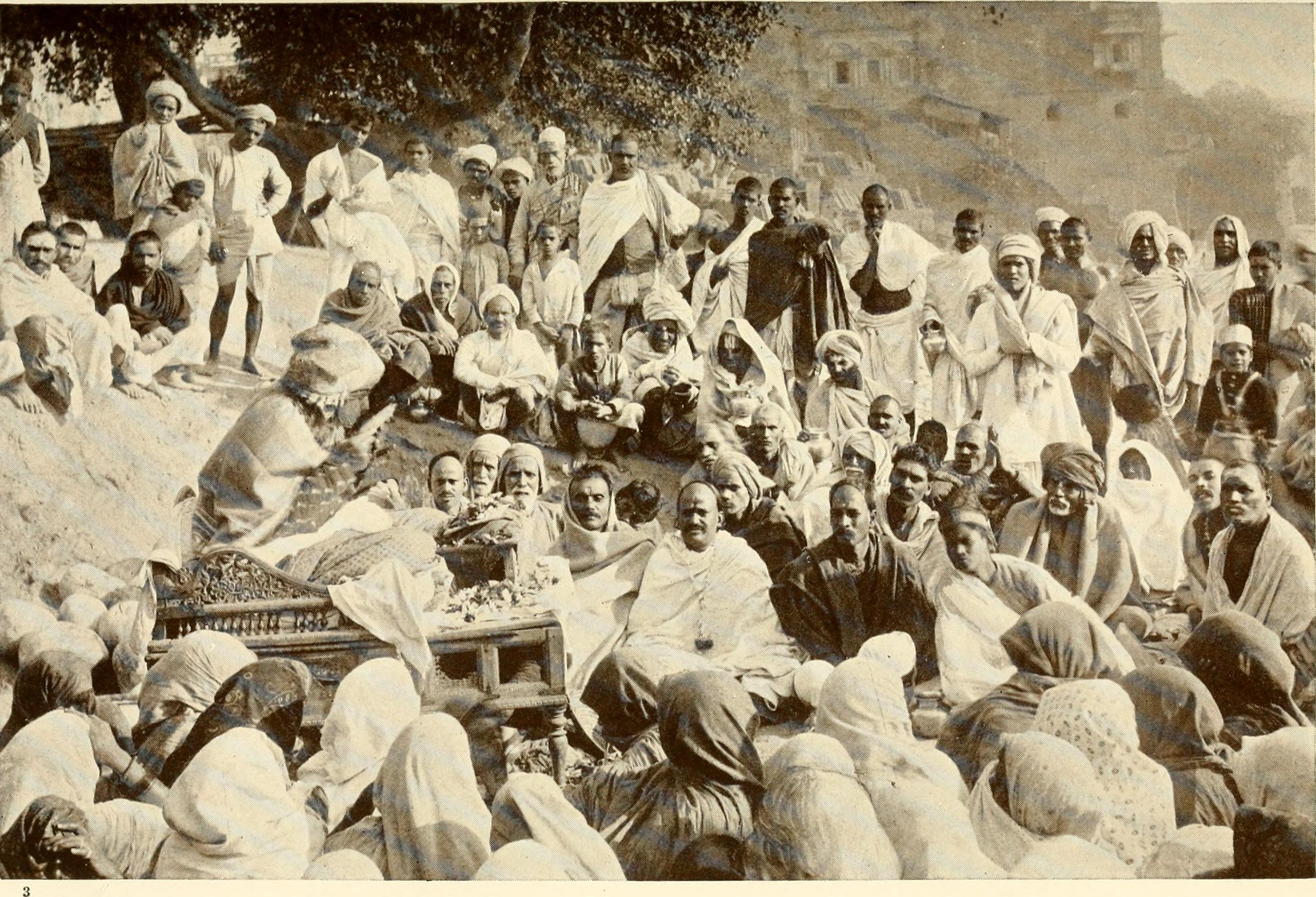
Vyasa (sitting on high table), the common title for Indian oral storytellers, reciting epics among villagers, 1913

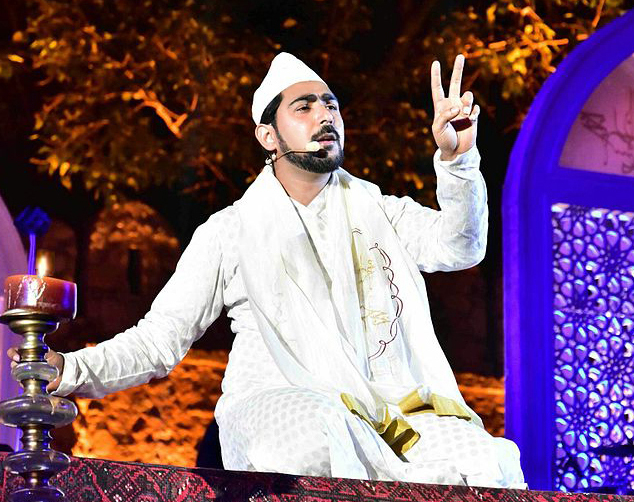
21st century, dastangoi artist Syed Sahil Agha reciting the Dastan-e-Amir Khusrau

== Etymology ==
Dastangoi has its origin in the Persian language. Dāstān means a tale; the suffix -gōī makes the word mean "to tell a tale".

== History ==
Indian urban anthropologist Ghaus Ansari ascribed the origin of dastangoi to pre-Islamic Arabia, and detailed how the eastward spread of Islam carried dastangoi to Iran and then to Delhi in India. Prior to Islam, Arabic literature was rich with heroic stories of tribal chiefs defeating their enemies and the bravery they showed in battle. This was part of the Arabic genre of storytelling known as Sira and Qissa. The name derives itself from the most popular Arabic romance at the time known as ‘The Romance of Antar’ or ‘Sira Antar’.

In Persia, Dastangoi saw the inclusion of the Persian concept of sacred kingship or an ideal king. In most Persian tales, poets and storytellers would attempt to highlight the benign and noble aspects of kings to create a persona that is not only palatable to the public, but would also win their hearts and imaginations. Kings would be viewed as mentors and spiritual guides and the title of Sahibqiran was used to symbolise the noble aspects of a king. This aspect of the Dastangoi tradition was carried over to Mughal India. The Mughals patronised ideas of flawless justice and their ideas of kingship was one that was saintly and mystical rather than despotic. By patronising stories which included such depictions, including the Dastan of Amir Hamza, the Mughals ensured that the stories that were widespread in their empire promoted a positive image of rulers and warriors.

Akbar was so entranced with the stories of Amir Hamza that he would recite the stories to himself. He would then undertake one of his court's first artistic projects, the commission of the illustrated version of the Dastan of Amir Hamza, known as the Hamzanama. The commissioning of the Hamzanama was a mammoth task consisting of 1200 folios. Owing to Emperor Akbar’s dyslexia, the commission included up to 1400 miniatures depicting various events of the story. The Hamzanama allowed the stories of Amir Hamza to spread all across India and beyond. Dastangoi’s purpose of entertaining the audience and relating to them meant that the commission was heavily influenced by and included aspects of Indian culture. Miniatures and illustrations of the Hamzanama portray soldiers in Mughal attire and even carry guns which were absent in the original stories. There is also the presence of Hindu idols in these illustrations, such as in one page of the Hamzanama on display in the Victoria and Albert Museum. Later versions of the Hamzanama such as the one in Jaunpur in the 15th century, depicts women in local Indian dresses.

The skill of a Dastango lay in commanding the audiences attention at all times. To prevent an audience from flittering away at the slightest drop of intensity, the art demanded acting and performing skills that ranged from drama to dance to mime to performance art. Dastangos would also have extensive knowledge on warfare and politics, in order to craft stories that were thrilling and could engross the laymen just as well as rulers and courtiers with stories of political intrigue. Instances within Dastan-e-Amir Hamza describe battles with meticulous detail which reflects the storyteller's immense knowledge in weaponry, machinery and troop alignments. The Dastangos extensive use of this knowledge meant that storytellers would play an integral role within the court of kings. Dastangos were so popular that rulers competed with each other to entice and inveigle storytellers from their lands by promising greater rewards. For example, sources make mention of a faithful servant and storyteller that worked under Emperor Akbar named Inayat Allah Darbar Khan. Darbar Khan was the son of a renowned storyteller in the Safavid empire in Iran named Zain al-Abidin Takaltu Khan. Besides narrating stories to Akbar, Darbar Khan also acted as his political advisor and messenger.

The early dastango's told tales of magic, war and adventure, and borrowed freely from other stories such as the Arabian Nights, storytellers such as Rumi, and storytelling traditions such as the Panchatantra. From the 14th century, Persian dastangois started focusing on the life and adventures of Amir Hamza, the paternal uncle of the Islamic prophet Muhammad. The Indian stream of dastangoi added storytelling elements such as aiyyari (trickery) to these tales.

the Indian Rebellion of 1857, during which several artists, writers and dastangos moved from Delhi to Lucknow. In Lucknow, dastangoi was popular across all classes, and was regularly performed at diverse locations including chowks (city squares), private households, and afīm khāna (public opium houses). "It became so popular among opium addicts that they made listening to stories an important element of their gatherings," wrote Ansari. "The prolonged intoxication and prolonged stories narrated by professional story-tellers was mostly combined. Each afeem khana had its own story-teller to entertain the clients; whereas, among the rich, every household used to appoint a dastango as a member of its staff." According to Abdul Halim Sharar, the noted author and historian of nineteenth century Lucknow, the Art of dastangoi, was divided under the following headings: "War", "Pleasure, "Beauty", "Love" and "Deception".

This rise in popularity of Dastangoi had a unique aspect to it. Ralph Russel offers the perspective that the rise in popularity of Dastangoi coincided with the decline of the Mughal empire creating a period of political turmoil. Hence, Dastangoi became a form of respite for the people to detach themselves from the tumultuous period they were witnessing. They could escape into a world where everything was beautiful and every protagonist was a paragon of Islamic virtue.

By the 20th century, the popularity of Dastangoi began to wane. The advent of British rule in India and the arrival of modern forms of entertainment such as the Indian film industry, shifted peoples interest away from traditional oral storytelling. The period also saw an embrace of Victorian literary values, people praised moralistic and realistic fiction and long narrative poems. Simultaneously, Dastans came to be seen as immoral and obscene.

Mir Baqir Ali was the last famous Dastango of India. He was believed to know thousands of verses by heart and had such mastery over the art form that he could effortlessly emulate the mannerisms of and switch between characters, whether they be kings, old women, etc. With his death in 1928, Dastangoi entered into a period of hiatus as well.

== List of early Urdu Dastans ==
- Sab Ras - Mulla Wajhi
- Nau tarz-i murassa‘ - Husain ‘Atā Khān Tahsīn
- Nau ā'īn-i hindī (Qissa-i Malik Mahmūd Gīti-Afroz) - Mihr Chand Khatrī
- Jazb-i ‘ishq - Shāh Husain Haqīqat
- Nau tarz-i murassa‘ - Muhammad Hādī a.k.a. Mirzā Mughal Ghāfil
- Ārā'ish-i mahfil (Qissa-i Hātim Tā'ī) - Haidar Bakhsh Haidarī
- Bāgh o bahār (Qissa-i chahār darwesh) - Mīr Amman
- Dāstān-i Amīr Hamza - Khalīl ‘Alī Khān Ashk
- Fasana e Ajaib - Rajab Ali Baig Suroor
- Deval Devi-Khizr Khan - (Romantic dastan of a Vaghela princess and Delhi's Khalji king) - Amir Khusrau
- Khamsa (Khamsa-e-Khusrau) five classical romances dastan: Hasht-Bihisht, Matlaul-Anwar, Khosrow and Shirin, Layla and Majnun and Aaina-Sikandari. - Amir Khusrow

== Dastangoi in print ==
Fort William College in Kolkata published an Urdu version of the dastaan of Amir Hamza in the beginning of the 19th century. Munshi Nawal Kishore, a publisher in Lucknow, began publishing the dastaans by the 1850s. A few publications were also done in Persian.

- In 1881, Nawal Kishore commissioned the print edition of the entire Hamza dastan from three dastangos, Mohammed Husain Jah, Ahmed Husain Qamar, and Sheikh Tasadduq Husain. Over a period of twenty five years, the trio produced a collection of 46 volumes. Each volume could be read individually or as a part of the complete work.
- Dastan-e-Hind, is a collection of dastans and Indian folklore, has been performed by many artists around the globe, by Syed Sahil Agha in 2010.
- Toh Hazireen Hua Yun... Dastan-e-Ankit Chadha - A collection of dastans woven, by Ankit Chadha. 2019.
- Dastangoi-2 is a sequel to earlier book. It contains the collection of modern dastans written and adapted, by Mahmood Farooqui. 2019.

== See also ==
- Dastan
- List of Urdu prose dastans
