= Zarlik and Munglik =

Folktale from Uzbekistan

Zarlik and Munglik (German: Zảrlik und Munglik; Uzbek: Zorlik va Munglik) is an Uzbek folktale collected by Uzbek folklorist Mansur Afzalov and translated into German by Isidor Levin and Ilse Laude-Cirtautas. It is related to the theme of the calumniated wife and is classified in the international Aarne-Thompson-Uther Index as ATU 707, "The Three Golden Children".

These tales refer to stories where a girl promises a king she will bear a child or children with wonderful attributes, but her jealous relatives or the king's wives plot against the babies and their mother. Variants of the tale type are registered in Central Asia, in the Turkic languages and among the Turkic peoples that inhabit the region.

== Publication ==
The Uzbek tale was also translated to Russian as "Зорлик и Мунглик" ("Zorlik and Munglik").

== Summary ==
A padishah has four wives, but has not fathered any child yet. One day, the youngest wife, named Gulbahra ("Rose-Beautiful") announces she is pregnant. The padishah rejoices in this fact. Gulbahra gives birth to twins, a boy and a girl. The other co-wives, however, see this as a threat to their position and bribe a sorceress named Mastan Kampir to get the children and replace them for puppies.

The sorceress takes the children and abandons them in the woods, hoping that the wild animals will devour the twins. Against her expectations, the children are nursed by a wild deer as their foster mother. Years later, a hunter kills the deer and the twins are all alone in the world. They are found by an old man, who named the boy Zarlik ("The sorrowful one") and the girl Munglik ("The sad one").

The boy becomes a mighty and fine hunter and one day encounters his father, the padishah. The padishah admires the boy and wishes he could have such a son. He goes back to his palace and the co-wives learn of the twins survival. To get rid of the children for good, they order Mastan Kampir to cook up some trick. So Mastan Kampir visits the twins' house and tells Munglik about a Weltenspiegel ("A World-Mirror"), so she can see the whole world.

Munglik tells Zarlik about the World-Mirror and goes on a quest. With the help of the Semurgh bird, he brings home the mirror. One day, Munglik peers into the mirror, and discovers their father is the padishah, and their mother is buried in a hole in the ground, joined with two hounds. The twins invite the padishah to peer into the mirror, and he discovers the twins are his children. He punishes the three co-wives and the sorceress, and restores Gulbahra as his queen.

== Analysis ==
=== Tale type ===
The tale is classified in the international Aarne-Thompson-Uther Index as type ATU 707, "The Three Golden Children". According to folklorist Erika Taube, the tale type is "widespread" in Turkic-Mongolian traditions, a position also held by scholars Isidore Levin and Ilse Laude-Cirtautas, who assert its spread in Turkic traditions.

==== The Central Asian epic ====
The story also exists as an homonymous epic poem known among the Turkic peoples: according to Isidore Levin, Ilse Laude-Cirtautas and Kyrgyz scholarship, versions exist among the Karakalpak (Муңлық-Зарлық), the Kyrgyz and the Kazakh. In that regard, Turkish scholarship noted that the Kyrgyz epic Muňluk ve Zarlık shares motifs and plot structure with tales from Turkey, so much so it has been suggested they originate from a common cultural background of the Turkic peoples. Similarly, Kyrgyz scholarship suggests its diffusion among the neighbouring Turkic peoples as an oral tale, and indicates an origin for the story among the Siberian Turco-Mongolian peoples.

=== Motifs ===
According to Erika Taube, these tales show variation in the number of the khan's wives (none, at first, or 1, 2, 3, 12 and even 108); the number of children (a son, two sons, a son and daughter pair, or three sons), and their attributes (golden chest, silver backside, or legs of gold or silver). In addition, a feature of tales of the Turkic-speaking world is the occurrence of polygamy, practiced by men who marry many wives and who cannot have children. The number of wives in the fairy tales vary, numbering 2, 3, 4, 6, 9, 10, 30, 40, 41 or 60.

== Variants ==
=== Uzbekistan ===
==== Hasan and Zuhra ====
Similarities have been noted between tale type 707 and the Uzbek tale "Хасан и Зухра" ("Hasan and Zuhra"). In a version of the tale, published by Uzbek author Mikhail I. Sheverdin, despite being married to 40 wives, the shah still hasn't fathered a son. In his wanderings, he finds three sisters, daughters of a shepherd, talking among themselves: Nasiba, Gulbahor and Sulfiya. The youngest, Sulfiya, promises to give birth to twins, a boy named Hasan and a girl named Zuhra, both beautiful and smart. The midwife replaces them with two goats, puts the twins in a bag and abandons it on the road. Thankfully, they are saved by a coming caravan. Twelve years pass, and Hasan, now a youth, meets his father, the shah, during a hunt. The shah convenes with a wise old woman, who discusses with the monarch the truth of what happened to his twin children. In a review of Sheverdin's book, scholar Heda Jason classified the tale as type ATU 707.

==== A Shining Pottery Bowl ====
Uzbek author Mikhail I. Sheverdin published another Uzbek tale titled in Russian: Блестящая глиняная чаша, romanized: Vlestyatşaya glinyanaya çaşa ("A Shining Pottery Bowl"). In this tale, a tsar has 40 wives, but no son yet. His viziers suggest he take another wife. He marries another maiden. One day, she announces she is expecting a son. The other 40 wives feel threatened by the newcomer and bribe the midwife to get rid of the child as soon as they are born. The 41st wife gives birth to a pair of twins, a boy and a girl. The midwife takes the royal children, replaces them for puppies and abandons both in the wilderness to die. The youngest queen is banished to the steppe with the puppies, while her children are raised by a she-bear in a cave. Years later, the tsar's co-wives learn of their survival and order the midwife to get rid of them. The midwife visits them and sets them on a quest for a shining pottery bowl and a magic mirror. To get the second item, the boy saves a nest of Simurgh birdlings and takes a journey to another kingdom on its back. In a review of Sheverdin's book, scholar Heda Jason classified the tale as type ATU 707. Professor Selami Fedakar considered it a Russian-language variant of the Uzbek tale he collected, "Parıldama Sırlı Tabak".

==== Glittering Enamelled Plate ====
In an Uzbek tale titled Parıldama Sırlı Tabak (Yaltıllama Sapal Tavak, "Glittering Enamelled Plate"), a sultan has forty wives, but no child. He complains about it to his viziers, who suggest he takes a new wife who can provide him an heir. The sultan remarries and his fortieth wife soon becomes pregnant, to the co-wives's consternation, who fear they will fall out of favour with their husband as soon as her child is born. The co-wives bribe a midwife and they set up a trap for the newest queen and take her children, a boy and a girl, as soon as they are born and replace them for puppies. The sultan returns from a hunt, falls for the deception and orders his wife to be buried in the desert up to the torso and to be placed with the dogs. As for the children, they are abandoned in the woods and found by a bear, which brings them to its den. The bear raises the twins: the girl spends her days in the cave, while her brother hunts food for them. Years later, one day, the sultan is on a hunt himself when he spots the girl by the bear's cave entrance and tries to approach her, but she flees to the depths of the cave. When the sultan retreats, the girl returns to the entrance. The sultan returns home and comments about it to his forty wives. The co-wives the children are alive and bribe the midwife again to get rid of them. The midwife goes to the cave to meet the girl and convinces her to search for the "glittering enamelled plate". The male twin returns home and is told about his sister's request, then says it is a perilous quest. Still, the boy journeys on: with the helpful advice of a sage, he rides a horse to a stream and summons the plate, which rises out of the water and trails behind the boy. After the first quest, the midwife tells the girl about the mirror that can show the whole world. For the second quest, the boy protects a nest of Simurgh chicks from a dragon and, in return, gives him a feather. He journeys on until he finds the king who owns the mirror, and uses a Simurgh feather to remove a thorn from the monarch's hand. The boy returns with the mirror. Later, the sultan meets the twins again and decides to adopt them, since they are also fatherless. The male twin delivers him a book which reveals the co-wives' intrigue, and the sultan banishes them. At the end of the tale, the sultan sends his viziers to retrieve the twins' mother from the desert, but whenever they go, the dogs (which were the puppies) attack them. The male twin himself goes to rescue his mother, who demands to be given a carriage and better dressed so she can go to court like a sultan's wife. It is done so, and the family reunites. The twins are then given the names Şehzade Batır (the boy) and Gülferah (the girl).

==== The Golden-Braided Boy ====
In the tale "Золотая косичка" ("The Golden-Braided [Boy]"), a padishah and his viziers sight a giant red rose, where three peri women are weaving. The peris are asked about their abilities, the youngest promises to bear the padishah a golden-braided boy. The padishah marries the third peri woman, and the viziers the other two. The padishah's other co-wives bribe a midwife to get rid of the boy and replace him for puppies. The midwife throws the boy into the steppe, but he is found and suckled by a hart. The boy returns to his father's palace and the co-wives take the boy, lock him up in a chest and cast him in the sea. He survives this second attempt and is found by a fisherman. Years later, the co-wives and the midwife send the boy for a flower gulikakhkakh, forty magical cauldrons and a magic mirror.

==== The Twin Children with Golden Hair ====
Researcher Gabrielle Keller published an Uzbek tale, first collected in 1999 in Bulungur, Samarqand, from informant Qumri Abdimuminova. In this tale, titled Die goldhaarigen Zwillingskinder ("The Twin Children with Golden Hair"), a padeschah named Odil Chan is 43 years old, but has no children. One day, on a hunt, he approaches a house where a man lived with his three daughters, and overhears their conversation: the eldest promises to weave a carpet like no one has ever had; the middle one that she can build castles like the people never had, and the youngest promises to give birth to a golden-haired son. Odil Chan marries the youngest sister as his fourth wife, and she gives birth to twins, a boy and a girl. The padeschah's other wives become jealous and order a maidservant to get puppies, place the animals in the newborns' cradles to deceive him, and abandon the twins in the steppe. The maidservant bribes a wood gatherer to kill the children and bring back a cloth with their blood, but, out of pity, the wood-gatherer hides the children behind a bush and presents a cloth with dove's blood as proof of his deed. Some time later, the old man returns to check on the children and see a castle where he left them. He tries to bypass the castle, and enter a garden. He sees the twins, frolicking naked in the garden and eating the apples. The female twin calls out for her brother to see the old man, who promises to take them to city and clothe them. After the twins go to the city, the padescha Odil Chan begins to uncover the truth, and punishes his other wives.

==== Vospirokhun ====
Uzbek author Mikhail I. Sheverdin published an Uzbek tale titled "Воспирохун" ("Vospirokhun"), two rival shahs, White Shah and Black Shah, order a bald man to find batyrs to form an army to fight each other. The bald man meets a youth on a horse with a magic whip, who helps him defeat the army and lets him take the credit for it. The youth then says his name is Vospirokhun, promises to come to his aid whenever he utter his name, and departs. Later, the bald man marries the Black Shah's daughter, discovers Vospirohun is a girl and goes on a quest to find her. The bald man finds an old woman who is Vospirokhun's mother, who gives him advice on how to approach her daughter: enter her hut, where she is in her forty-day sleeping cycle, tie her hair in forty knots to forty pillars, and hold her tight. Vospirokhun wakes up and recognizes her friend, then marries him. Later, the bald man accidentally lets her picture float down the stream to another kingdom, whose monarch sights the picture and falls in love with its owner, then tries to kidnap her, but the bald man, Vospirokhun's husband, rescues her. After also escaping from a den of thieves and their leader, the bald man returns to the White Shah's lands and marries his daughter. The bald man becomes the Shah in his father-in-law's place and goes on hunts. Two years later, one day, before he goes on a hunt, he asks his three wives what they will bring him when he returns: Vospirokhun promises to bear him twins, a boy and a girl with golden or silver heads, and the other co-wives, the daughter of the White Shah and the daughter of the Black Shah, also promise to bear him children. The bald man departs, and Vospirokhun becomes pregnant, to her rivals' concern and jealousy. Vospirokhun is ready to give birth to her twins, a boy and a girl, and the other co-wives promise to bring a kind midwife to look after her: they bribe an old woman, who takes the children as soon as they are born, replaces them for puppies and abandons them in the steppe. The bald shah returns and, on seeing the puppies, orders Vospirokhun to be banished to the zindan.

As for the children, a man named Khizrbuva finds the children in the steppes, draws a circle on the ground with his staff, and an iron palace appears to house the children. Khizrbuva wonders aloud who can suckle the children, and a she-goat suddenly trots to him. The she-goat complains it cannot produce milk even for its young, but Khizrbuva bids the animal suckle and rear the twin children inside the palace, and it will be able to produce milk for its own young. Time passes, the she-goat suckles the children, who grow up and live in the castle: the boy, named Sohibkurol, spends his day hunting, while the girl, named Sohibjamol, stays at home. One day, the old woman who delivered the children, who always goes for a walk in the steppe to gather twigs, finds the girl alone at the iron palace and deduces she is Vospirokhun's child. She convinces her to send her twin brother to bring some roses from such a place and some nightingales that fly over the flowers and sing beautifully. Next, the old woman tells them to seek a winged white horse in some distant mountains, and lastly for a maiden named Sangil Sopoltosh that lives in a distant country. Khizrbuva advises Sohibkurol in his quests, and he is successful. The old woman appears again, but Sangil Sopoltosh chastises her presence there and Sohibkurol cuts up the old woman with his sword. Later, Sohibkurol meets the bald monarch (unaware he is his father), shares some game he hunted with him, and is convinced to host the monarch in his own house. The boy laments to the Khizrdeva he cannot properly host the bald monarch in his own meagre home, but Khizrbuva says the boy should not worry and has to simply return home, for everything will be arranged. Sohibkurol rides home to the iron palace and finds it richly furnished with servants and furniture. The bald king goes to the twins' palace for a meal, and Khizrbuva asks if he can tell him a story: he explains everything to the bald monarch, indicates the twins are his children, and vanishes. The family is reunited, rescue Vospirokhun and bring her home, as the other co-wives are executed. Sohibkurol assumes the throne after his bald father relinquishes it in his son's favour, and he and his wife Sangil Sopoltosh have three male children. Later, Sohibkurol's three sons go on a quest for a lovely princess. Sohibkurol and Sangil Sopoltosh's youngest son finds the princess, but is betrayed by his elder brothers and tossed in a ditch to die. The cadet prince returns home, the princess explains everything, Sohibkurol punishes his traitorous elder sons and marries his youngest to the princess. In a review of Sheverdin's book, scholar Heda Jason classified the tale as a combination of types, the middle part belonging to type ATU 707.

==== The Khan, the Twins, and the Evil Wives ====
In an Uzbek tale translated to Russian with the title "Хан, близнецы и злые жёны" ("The Khan, the Twins, and the Evil Wives"), a khan has forty wives, and still no son. He meets three maidens, sisters, on the road and questions them about their abilities: the elder boasts she can sew tyubeteikas that khans wear, the middle one that she can prepare soup with a handful of oats for a whole village, and the youngest promises to bear twins, a boy with gold feet and a girl with silver feet, and both will produce silver and gold with their every step. The khan decides to take the youngest sister as his newest wife and marries her. He takes her back to the palace, places her in a white yurt and she becomes pregnant in time. The other forty wives conspire with a wicked old woman to get rid of the children, for the khan will favour the mother of his twins instead of them. Thus, when the khanum gives birth to her promised children, the old woman places them in a chest and abandons them up a mountain, then takes two puppies and places them next to the khanum. The khan returns and is told his wife gave birth to animals, so he orders her and the puppies to be taken to a distant island and abandoned there. As for the children, a deer finds the twins inside the chest and nurses them with its milk. Years later, the khan is on a hunt and finds a trail of silver and golden footsteps. He follows the trail and reaches a cave, where the twins are. He asks the twins whose children are they, and the twins answer that they do not know, save for the deer who nursed them. The khan takes the twins back home and sends for the old woman, demanding to know what happened to the children. The old woman, fearing for her life, reveals she dropped them in the mountains. The khan then goes to rescue his wife, the twins' mother, and finds her safe and sound. The khanum says the puppies, now dogs, have hunted hares for her. The khan takes his wife back, and banishes the forty wives to the steppe.

=== Kyrgysztan ===
==== Munduk Zarlık ====
In a Kyrgyz dastan titled Munduk Zarlık or Munduk ve Zarlık ("Munduk and Zarlık"), Nogay monarch, Khan Çançarkan wishes to have a child, and has married sixty times, but none of his wives has given him an heir. In his despair, a dervish appears to him in a dream and advises him to take yet another wife. This fails. After the sixty-first wife, the monarch enters into a hole and wishes for death. After forty days, a Khidr appears to the monarch and advises him to take a wife among his people by sacrificing cattle and making a grand feast for his subjects. It happens thus and the people are invited to the palatial feast. During the event, Çançarkan then gives an order that a suitable bride shall be given to him. The guests cannot provide his request and ride away, while a poor man named Cobdur remains. Cobdur returns home and tells his daughter Kançayım about their khan's orders, and Kançayım decides to go to talk to the monarch, since she has had a dream about a sword and an earring, and a falcon flying in and stealing her veil, which she interprets as portents of future delivery of a boy and a girl, the sword representing the boy and the earring the girl. (Note: In a Kyrgyz version of the epic, the twins' mother has a dream about a bird perching on her head; in another version, she has a dream about holding the sun and the moon in her arms.) Kançayım asks her father to ask for a huge dowry in gold coins, and marries the khan. Çançarkan places a pregnant Kançayım in a room and goes to hunt in the Aziret mountains, promising sixty gold bars to whoever brings him good news. An old woman Mastan approaches the jealous sixty co-wives and offers her services in exchange for payment: she will get rid of the newborns. Mastan tricks Kançayım into hiring her as her midwife, and helps in the delivery of the babies: twins, a boy and a girl with golden chest and silver backside. Mastan places dogs near the mother and goes to throw the children in water, but has second thoughts and sings a song about it. The children beg her not to throw them in water, but she does it anyway. The babies are somehow saved and nursed by a doe, and later rescued by a holy man named Gayberen and Kırk Çiltan (or Kırklar), being given the names Zarlık (the boy) and Munluk (the girl) and raised in the Şükürlük mountains. Çançarkan, believing that Kançayım gave birth to dogs, banishes her to the forest with the puppies. Years later, Zarlik goes to hunt in the mountains and Çançarkan sights something shining there. The monarch goes there and finds Zarlik, his silver chest and golden backside shining with a metallic glow. The monarch goes to embrace the youth, but Zarlik rebuffs him with an arrow. The sixty co-wives learn of their encounter and conspire with Mastan how to destroy them. Mastan has a plan: she goes to the cave where Munduk lives, gives her some clothes since the girl is naked and tries to trick her by saying she is their mother. She leaves and Zarlik returns, telling Munduk the woman is a witch and a liar. Mastan returns another time and convinces the girl to send her brother to take king Külmas's horse Külsaman and ride to the Külmöskan region in search of a wife for himself, Kuralay, and nice clothes for her. Zarlik falls for the false mission, kills some horses to fashion clothes for him and his sister, and rides into the wilderness. After six months, Hizir appears to Zarlik and says it is a dangerous mission given by witch Mastan. Zarlik, who is strong as many men, reaches Külmöskan, where he makes his case to find Kuralay and the horse, but the king mocks him and sends his soldiers to kill him. Zarlik kills the soldiers and confronts king Külmas, who tells him that the princess Kuralay has been kidnapped by the Kara Dev (Black Dev). Zarlik reaches Kara Dev's domains and, with Kuralay's help, defeats and kills the dev, then returns with the princess to Külmöskan, where he is made khan. Zarlik returns home with Kuralay and gifts, and Munduk greets her new sister-in-law. At the end of the tale, Çançarkan goes to hunt a roe deer with silver chest, golden back and jeweled horns, promising to reward the one who kills it. Zarlik and Çançarkan chase after the same deer in the forest, when the deer turns into a holy man, who reveals to the pair they are father and son. King and prince reunite and embrace. The holy man also tells that Kançayım is his mother, and the monarch and the twins go to the forest to find her. Kançayım is still with the puppies, but recognizes Munduk and Zarlik as her children. Çançarkan then hangs the other sixty co-wives, retakes Kançayım as his true queen and lives with his twin children. In another version of the dastan, there is a second quest given by Mastan to the twins: she sends them on a quest for a magic mirror that can see the whole world, located in Zılay Dağ (Mountain Zılay). Zarlik goes to the mountain and fails in the quest, but his sister Munduk rescues him.

==== Other tales ====
In a Kyrgyz tale ritled XANDIN BALASI, translated to Turkish as HANIN OĞLU and to Hungarian as A kán fia ("The children of the khan"), a khan, Aydarkan Han, has 40 other wives, but marries a maiden he meets in his travels who promises to give birth to twins, a boy and a girl with golden chest and silver back. They are born, replaced by puppies and adopted by a man named Akmat (Akmat Pehlivan in the Kyrgyz text). Years later, the male twin searches for a white apple tree that always bears fruit, a talking parrot and a woman of great beauty named Kulanda.

In a Kyrgyz tale published by authors D. Brudnoi and Kasymbek Yeshmambetov with the title "Злые жены" ("Evil Wives"), a khan has 40 wives, but no children yet. One day, on a travel, the khan meets three sisters: the elder says she can sew kalpaks for him; the middle one that she can feed a whole village with a small quantity of oatmeal, and the youngest promises she can bear him twins, a boy with golden legs and a girl with silver ones, and wherever they walk, gold or silver appear with every step. The khan decides to take the third sister as his wife, to the horror and jealousy of the other 40 ones. The co-wives ask a witch to get rid of the children as soon as they are born, so she hides them a chest and throws them in the mountains, then replaces the twins for puppies. When the khan sees the puppies instead of human babies, he orders his 41st wife and the puppies to be banished to a distant island. As for the children, they are found by a female deer and suckled with its milk. Years later, the khan goes on a hunt in the mountains and sees a trail of golden and silver steps leading into a cave. He follows the footsteps and finds the twins, then inquires about their origin. They can only say that a deer reared them. The khan returns to the palace and orders the witch to explain herself. The witch is forced to reveal the ruse; the twins and his wife are brought to the palace, the co-wives expelled and the witch thrown off a cliff.

In a Kyrgyz tale titled Cilamiş Han, a khan named Cilamiş has no children, despite being married to forty wives. One day, he goes with his viziers to hunt birds. He releases a falcon to start the hunt and it perches on the roof of a poor house. The monarch asks for the bird back, and its occupant appears: a beautiful girl. Cilamiş admires her beauty and sends for the girl's father. The monarch leaves, while the girl has a dream during the night: she has gone to the khan and given birth to twins, a boy and a girl with the upper body of gold and the lower body of silver. The girl tells her father about the dream and comments that she met the khan earlier that morning, and says her father should divulge her dream. She then gives her father an empty, inexhaustible purse for the khan to fill with her bride price, and the purse will never be full. The girl's father, called Bolot Beg, goes to the khan and reveals the dream of the birth of the twins, and the khan wants to marry her, filling the never-filling purse with the bride price. The khan sends for the old witch to discern what is wrong with the purse, and she empties the purse of gold and fills it with earth. She explains that the purse was made with the membrane of a human eye: it never gets its fill of gold, but it is sated with earth. Cilamiş Khan marries the girl, named Aysulu. Aysulu becomes pregnant and gives birth to twins while he is away on a hunt. The forty wives conspire with the old witch, Mastan, to get rid of the twins by throwing them in the sea, then inform the king his wife Aysulu gave birth to puppies. The co-wives send a letter to the khan, who orders Aysulu to be taken to an island with the dogs and left there. The puppies are fed with Aysulu's breastmilk and hunt partridges and pheasants for them. The children survive being thrown in the water, and Kayberen takes them to nurse the twins on deer milk. Cilamiş Khan laments that he has no children and isolates himself for years on end, until one day he decides to go to the countryside. During a hunt, he sights a male child among the deer. He laments that he wished to have children, and the co-wives suspect something, so they consult with Mastan what became of the children. Mastan goes to investigate in the mountains and finds the twins living in a cave: the boy grown large and strong and living with his sister. The witch decides to approach the female twin first, fearing the male twin's strength, and pretends to be their mother. The female twin sees through the lie and says that her mother is a deer. The female twin mentions the old woman who visited earlier to her twin and he forbids her from opening the door when the witch comes. However, Mastan returns and convinces the girl she is alone in the cave, so her twin could find her a companion: the beautiful Gülayım, daughter of Külbös Han. The female twin tells her brother about it and he goes after this princess. The male twin is naked and people comment on his nakedness, which does not seem to bother him, and insist he puts on some clothes. After some misunderstandings, the male twin is brought to Kulbos Han's presence. The male twin says he is after the princess Gulayim and the horse Gulsari, but the monarch promises to give both to the youth if he kills a black giant that devours the people. The youth agrees to kill the black giant and borrows the Gulsari horse to fight it. He wrestles with the giant, and uses his horse to carry the giant's house to a ravine, then kills and beheads the giant. Kulbos Han is glad for the youth's success, marries him to princess Gulayim and sends a courtly retinue with them back to his homeland. The male twin returns with his bride to the mountains where he lives with his sister. Meanwhile, Cilamis Han, after another spell of sadness and grief, decides to hunt in the mountains and sets his sights on a deer. He follows the deer to the doors of a large house and sees it jump into the youth's arms. Cilamis Han orders the youth to give him the deer, and the youth says that these are his lands. Cilamis Han notices that the youth's body is golden in the upper part and silver in his lower part and realizes he is his own son. He embraces the youth and says he is his son, wanting to see the daughter. The youth asks if he has a mother, and Cilamis Han correctly deduces this was the work of his forty co-wives. The monarch sends for the forty co-wives and confronts them about their wicked deeds, and they ask for witch Mastan to come. The female twin asks for the viziers to rescue her mother, and the viziers bring Aysulu from the forested island she was living on, and bring her home after clearing up her name. Cilamis Han executes the forty co-wives by tying the group to forty mules and Mastan by tying her to a juniper tree, names the male twin Samağan and the female twin Sarıaltın, then invites Kulbos Han to his kingdom for a celebration. Lastly, Cilamis Han passes the kingdom to his son.

=== Kazakhstan ===
Kazakh literary critic and folklorist Seyt Kaskabasov stated that type 707 is among the 15 tale types of the international index that are present in both Kazakhstan and elsewhere. Type 707 is reported to register 8 or 9 variants, and Kaskabasov supposes that, apart from tale "Алтын Айдар" ("Altyn Aidar"), at least 6 variants derive from qissa (ru) (Kazakh oral epic poetry) "Мунлык-Зарлык" ("Munlyk-Zarlyk").

==== Muńlıq-Zarlıq ====
In the Kazakh epic Muńlıq-Zarlıq, the king of Nogai land, Şanşar, is 60 years old and has 60 wives, but still has not fathered a child. One day, a figure called Hazrat Khidr appears to him in a dream and tells him to marry a girl who shall bear him twins, a boy and a girl. King Şanşar finds this girl: Qanşayim, daughter of fisherman Jaudır. The king marries Qanşayim and she bears him a boy and a girl, (Note: In versions of the Kazakh epic, the boy has golden hair, and the girl has silver hair.) who are replaced for puppies and cast in the "Qazar Sea" by a witch named Mıstan Kempir. King Şanşar believes in the co-wives' trickery and banishes his wife and the dogs to a desert island. A person named Gayp Eren rescues the twins and names them Muńlıq (the girl) and Zarlıq (the boy), and lets them live with a deer as their milk mother. Zarlıq becomes a fine warrior, while Muńlıq is a talented young lady. The co-wives, however, learn of their survival, and send Mıstan Kempir to get rid of them. The witch convinces Muńlıq to send her twin to Külmes, the khan of the Kalmyk. The boy ends up fighting the Kalmyk army and marrying the khan's daughter, princess Quralay. Meanwhile, on the island, Qanşayim has a dream where she is told her children are alive and well. Back to the king Şanşar, he follows a deer of golden and silver fur during a hunt, which is actually a benevolent spirit that is trying to reunite father and son. On the hunt for the same deer is Zarlıq, who meets up with his father. This leads Şanşar to release Qanşayim and punish the witch.

==== Other tales ====
In a Kazakh tale, "Три сестры" ("Three Sisters"), a prince, the khan's son, is looking for a bride, when he stops by a tent, where he hears three womanly voices talking about their marriage wishes: the oldest sister says she will weave a golden carpet for his throne; the middle, that she will cook a feast for everyone with only an egg, and the youngest that she will bear the khan's son a boy with golden head and a girl with silver head. The prince decides to marry all three women, the first two accomplishing their promised feats. When it is time for the youngest queen to bear the fabled twins, her elder sisters convince a witch to throw the twins in the sea as soon as they are born and to replace them for animals. It just so happens and the twins are cast in a box that is saved by a poor old couple. They raise the twins and name the boy Kudaibergen ("given by God") and the girl Kunslu ("solar beauty"). Twelve years pass, the old man dies. The boy finds a powerful horse and begins to hunt, when he meets the king during a hunt. The sisters notice and send the witch to convince Kunslu to send her brother on dangerous quests: to get a self-playing dombra, a mirror that can see the whole "white world", and to seek Toshilar's daughter, Aislu ("lunar beauty") as his zhenge (the older brother's wife in the Kazakh familial system). Kudaibergen is advised by a helpful witch named Zhalmauyz Kempir, who, in regards to the second object (the mirror), tells the youth to seek the aid of the bird Samruk. When the boy tries to court Tolishar's daughter, her father shouts a magic spell to slowly petrify the youth. The prince, now khan himself, after seeing in the mirror his wife, tending to two dogs in the desert, orders his viziers to bring her back and learns of the whole plot.

In the Kazakh tale titled "Алтын Айдар" ("Altyn Aidar"), a khan has two wives. Before he leaves on a journey, he asks what his two wives will give him when he returns: the elder co-wife boasts she can build him a palace, while the younger promises to bear him a son and a daughter with a golden "aidar". The khan tells the younger co-wife to name the boy Altyn Aidar, and leaves. Both co-wives fulfill their promises, but the elder bribes a sorceress to take the children and drop them down a well, while placing a puppy and a kitten in their cradle. The khan returns and, seeing the animals, banishes the younger co-wife. Meanwhile, an eagle rescues the twins from the well and takes them to an old woman, who raises them. After the woman dies, Altyn Aidar begins hunting, while his sister stays in a cave. The elder co-wife learns of their survival and sends the sorceress to get rid of them. She convinces the female twin to send her brother to the pastures of Khan Kelmes, who owns a wild mare that foals colts that become tulpars. Altyn Aidar sails a boat to go to Khan Kelmes's lands, but a peri appears in the sea and tries to drown him by controlling the waves. The youth grabs her golden ring and she loses her powers, then reaches the pastures, where he holds a vigil on the herd for someone that is stealing Khan Kelmes's colts: another peri. Altyn Aidar threatens the second peri with a saber and gains a colt in return. Later, the sorceress goes back to the female twin and tells her her brother can find her a golden chest. Altyn Aidar rides his horse and meets an old woman near a fissure on the ground. The old woman tells him that many batyrs have come for the chest, but enter underground and become stones. Despite the danger, Altyn Aidar enters underground, but a third peri appears and petrifies him. His horse returns to the twins' cave; the female twin realizes her brother is in danger and rides the horse to the same place where the old woman is. She tells the old woman she will find her brother, and the peri, out of pity, restores her brother. Altyn Aidar returns home with his sister. Some time later, he walks in the woods and finds a yurt, where two peris are talking to each other about a youth who stole one's ring and the other's colts, but whom they wish to marry. Altyn Aidar appears to the peris and says he is the youth, taking them as his wives. At the end of the tale, the khan and Altyn Aidar meet during a hunt; a beast appears and reveals them the whole truth.

In a Kazakh tale titled Ақбілек Қыз - Түрғын Бала (Turkish: Akbilek Kız-Turğın Bala, English: "Girl Akbilek and Boy Turgin"), Bögen takes for wife a woman named Akborik, who becomes pregnant, drawing the ire of his other co-wives Kanikey and Tinikey, daughters of Nogay Khan. Forty batyrs come from Crimea to congratulate Bögen, and take him for a celebratory hunt. While he is away, the co-wives hire a witch named Mistan Kempir to get rid of the unborn children. Akborik gives birth to twins, a boy named Turgin and a girl named Akbilek. The co-wives make Akborik faint, replace the twins for puppies and give the babies for Mistan Kempir to kill them. The witch dons iron garments and walks very far, until she reaches a desert and drops them down a well. Back to Bögen, a letter is sent to him telling the false birth, and he orders his wife to be banished to the island of Kula Su with the puppies. As for the children, a monarch and his large caravan pass by the same desert the well is in, and he goes to draw water from the well. He notices the twin children, who sing a song that they have been protected by Allah and lived in the well, and wish to be given cattle. The Hodja takes the boy with him, but the members of the caravan complain to their leader. Turgin, being of "heroic lineage", steals a herd of cattle and a herd of horses and brings them with him to his sister. He spends the days hunting while she stays home. Back to Bögen, the forty batyrs convince him to join them for another hunt, and he releases his falcon ("Shahin") to guide the hunt. The falcon reaches the well where the children are, and perches on the girl Akbilek's arm. Bögen asks the girl to return the bird, and she wants to be given the bird for her brother. Bögen takes back the falcon and returns home, and his co-wives Kanikey and Tinikey learn the children are alive. Thus, they bribe Mistan Kempir to go there and get rid of them. Mistan Kempir walks back to the well, but finds a tent nearby, and goes to talk to Akbilek, passing herself as a wandering beggar lady. Mistan tells the girl her brother needs to find a wife for himself, and suggests Täpeltes, daughter of the Kalmyk khan who lives in the Kipchak Mountain. Turgin goes to the mountains and meets a kempir (old woman), whose breasts he suckles. The kempir says Täpeltes is her daughter, and marries them to each other. Next, Mistan Kempir convinces the girl to have a drink from the "sieve of white water". For this next quest, Turgin kills two snakes to protect the nest from the Samurik (Simurgh) bird, and their father, in gratitude, warns him there is an personal enemy driving him to death. Turgin heeds the warning, fights the Kalmyks for ten days, gets the white water and returns home. Back home, the twins learn the truth of their predicament, and Turgin captures Jalmavız Kempir. The twins also make their way to Bögen's tent, where the twins reconcile with their father. Bögen also orders his wife to be retrieved from the island, and the family is reunited again. The co-wives' deceit is brought to light and they are publicly exposed.

=== Karakalpak people ===
Following professor Marat Nurmukhamedov's study on Pushkin's verse fairy tale, The Tale of Tsar Saltan, Turkologist Karl Reichl argues that the dastan (a type of Central Asian oral epic poetry) titled Šaryar, from the Turkic Karakalpaks, is "closely related" to the tale type of the Calumniated Wife, and more specifically to The Tale of Tsar Saltan.

In a version of the epos published by Russian translator Sergey L. Severtsev, a ruler named Darapshah has nine wives, but no child. One day, he marries a beautiful maiden named Gulshara, and she bears him a pair of twins of "extraordinary beauty" named Sharyar and Anzhim. However, while king Darapshah is away, the nine co-wives bribe a sorceress to drown the children in a pond and replace them for a puppy and a kitten. Darapshah returns and sees the little animals. Tricked by the co-wives' deception, he banishes Gulshara away from the kingdom. As for the babies, they survive in the pond, until a slave hired by the co-wives takes them out, but, moved by their beauty, abandons them near a crossroads, until a kingly caravan finds the twins. The siblings are adopted by Khan Shasuar and his wife Akdaulet, and grow up as fine people: Sharyar a strong warrior and Anzhim a smart and well-read woman. The co-wives learn of the twins' survival and order the sorceress to get rid of them. The old witch pays a visit to Sharyar in his newly built fortress and tells him about a fabulous city called Takhta-Zarin (Тахта-Зарин, in the original), where he can find a magical bird Bulbilgoya (Бюльбильгоя, in the original), which can sing beautifully and whose blood can heal the king, and about a maiden of peerless beauty named Khundyzsha (Хундызша, in the original). Sharyar rides his horse to Khundyzsha's city and marries her, then goes looking for the bird in the city of Takhta-Zarin, despite the maiden's protests. He reaches Takhta-Zarin and meets Bulbilgoya, which is a sorcerous bird that turns him to stone after a battle. Later, Anzhim senses something happened to her brother and follows his tracks to save him.

In a Karakalpak language version of Шәрияр ("Sharyar"), patsha Shahidarap is in his forties and has forty-nine wives, and still no heirs, so he worries for the future of his kingdom. One day, he has an ominous dream about his realm, then decides to take another wife. He looks from his window and sees three maidens talking outside, all three wanting to marry Shahidarap: the first boasts she can weave clothes for forty thousand people with a single thread of silk from a single cocoon, the second one that she can feed the same amount of people with a single sheaf of barley, and the third one promises to bear him twins, a boy and a girl. The king sends for the three maidens, who belong to different families, but the first two dismiss their boasts as mere words, save for Gulshara, who marries the patsha and bears him twins, a boy and a girl, who are replaced for dogs and cast in the wilderness by a witch named Mistan. The twins are found by another king and given the names Sharyar ("Шәрияр") and Anjim ("Әнжим").

=== Turkmenistan ===
In a Turkmen tale titled Galandar soltan, translated to Turkish with the title Galandar Sultan ("Sultan Galandar"), a man has three daughters who dream to themselves: all three want to marry the sultan's son, the elder boasts she would feed the whole army with a single piece of rice, the middle one that she would weave a net with a fathom of silk, and the youngest promises to bear twins, a lovely son and a beautiful daughter. The sultan's son overhears their conversation and takes all three to the palace to live with him. One day, he bids the three fulfill their boasts: the elder prepares some pilaf for the soldiers and adds more salt; the middle one unravels the strands of a fathom of rope and weaves a large enough net, and the third waits for her pregnancy. While the prince is away on a hunt, the third sister gives birth to twins, a boy and a girl. The jealous elder sisters send a man to inform the prince that his wife gave birth to animals. The prince sends word to drop the animals in the wilderness for the jackals to eat them. The jealous aunts duly carry out his orders, and throw them in a well. A merchant passes by the well and tries to draw water, but finds the waterskin empty and ropes up a chest containing the twins. The merchant rescues the twins and names the boy Galandar and the girl Galdırgaç. The twins grow up. Galandar has a beautiful voice that amazes people and he even is invited by the sultan to come recite poems for them. Eventually, the old merchant dies, but asks on his deathbed for the twins to wait for a gray camel to come, which they are to follow and bury their adoptive father wherever the camel stops. Galandar keeps singing at the palace of his father, the sultan, and the jealous aunts recognize him as their nephew, so they bribe an old woman to get rid of the twins. The old woman visits Galdırgaç and advises her to lie that she saw Babasayat merchant in a dream, telling her to bring forty horses that are on a side of a certain mountain. Galandar goes to this mountain and, advised by an old sage, tames a white horse and takes it down the mountain, causing the entire herd to follow him. Next, the jealous aunts send the old woman again, and she convinces Galdırgaç to bring a bird ("kuș", in the Turkish translation) named Bilbilgöye from a vineyard, as their father told her in a dream. Galandar goes on a journey to seek this bird, reaches the vineyard and knocks on the door to two peris, who advise him to ask the cruel fairy for the location of Bilbilgöye. The cruel fairy points him to a garden where roses blooms and birds sing, which will petrify him if he looks at them, so he has to avoid seeing them. Galandar goes to the garden, but sees the animals and turns to stone. Back to Galdırgaç, she notices her brother is not returning and goes after him. She meets the cruel fairy, who directs her to the same garden and warns her not to be distracted by the birds and roses and to keep her head down, then force the bird to restore her brother by threatening to break its wings. Galdırgaç does as instructed, reaches the bird and twists its wings. In pain, the bird Bilbilgöye begs to be released and promises to do whatever the girl wishes, and Galdırgaç orders him to restore the petrified people in its garden and to move its house to their homeland. Bilbilgöye takes some earth and blows on it over the statues, reviving the people, then summons its servant, a white Dev, whom it orders to carry the mansion to their homeland, next to their adoptive father's hut. Galdırgaç reunites with her restored brother, and the mansion lands next to the merchant's hut. People comment on the magnificent palace, and the two jealous aunts try to convince the old woman to send them on some other dangerous journey, but the old woman admits defeat and says she cannot do it. Bilbilgöye instructs Galandar to invite the sultan to their new mansion, which is answered positively, and the bird instructs the youth to feed the sultan's horse with stones. After the meal with the sultan, he goes to retrieve his horse and finds it in tears. He sees that stones were given to the horse and questions the meaning of it, when Bilbilgöye asks that a horse does not eat stones, but a woman gives birth to kittens? Bilbilgöye reveals the whole story, and the sultan sends for the aunts, whom he married, and the old woman, who all confess her crimes. The monarch orders the co-wives to be tied to horseback and the old woman to be tied to a tree and for people to be cursed. The sultan resumes their feast and nominates Galandar as his successor, whose rule is a prosperous one.

In a Turkmen tale titled Üç gız dogan, translated to Turkish with the title Üç Kız Kardeș ("Three Sisters"), a rich man has three lazy daughters who refuse to clean or enter their cow pen, their sheep pen and camel pen, cursing them off. One day, the man brings some hawthorn berries with his wife and shows them to their daughters, asking them to bring some sacks the next time he goes to bring berries and to not look up when they are at the tree. The next time, the man gives torn sacks for his daughters, climbs up the tree and shakes the branches for them, then leaves the three daughters there. They fetch the berries, patch their sacks and return home, but cannot find their house, nor the pen of the animals, save for a single sheep. The sheep asks for some grass and water, and directs them to a path with pearls. The three sisters walk towards a giant's house, and a girl named Gülbike warns the sisters about the dev inside the house, urging them to run lest they are devoured. The sisters spring a trap for the dev with a millstone by the door, some ashes, and a nail to pierce the dev's foot, and run away. The dev goes to devours the girls, but the millstone hits his head, the ashes blind his eyes, and he steps on a nail. He then goes after the three sisters, but the girls throw behind their mirror which becomes a flat rock, a comb that becomes iron thorns, and a jug that becomes a bottomless river. On the other side of the river, the dev asks the sisters how they crossed the water, and they lie that they put stones in their pockets and tied stones around their necks. The dev does so and sinks to the bottom. The sisters escape and make their way to a forest. The youngest sister finds a plank from a tree which hides another dev's lair. They kill the dev and take over his house, then don male clothes to work as male herders: a sheep herder, the other a cattle herder, and the third a camel herder. Time passes, and one day the sultan passes by the house with his viziers. The three girls spot the sultan and invite them to their house, puts on their normal clothes to entertain them. The sultan says they are looking for wives; the viziers choose the elder two sisters and the sultan himself the youngest sister. The elder promises that she can feed all people with a handful of food and a handful and salt, the middle one that she can sew a shirt and trousers when her husband in on a horse, and the youngest promises to bear twins, a golden-haired son and a silver-haired daughter, to the sultan. Their marriages are arranged, and the elder sisters fulfill their promises, but begin to feel jealousy towards their cadette. Thus, they decide to get rid of their nephew and niece by throwing them in the river in a chest, then place puppies next to the sultana. The sultan falls for the deception, blinds the puppy and orders his wife to be buried to the waist and to place two dogs by her breasts. As for the children, a crow and a dev find the chest and dispute over it: the crow wants the recipient and the dev wants its contents. The dev finds the twins and raises them. One day, when the twins are seven, the dev says he will soon die, and asks them to bury him, but to hold a vigil for forty days and forty nights, and a black horse will appear to them to fulfill their wishes. The black horse takes the children to their homeland. Their aunts recognize the children as their sister's children and devise ways to eliminate them. They send an old woman, who convinces the female twin to ask for a seven-story house for them. The female twin says that they can live better in a large house than in a donkey's stable, and the horse recites a prayer for a house to appear to them. Next, the old woman convinces the girl to ask her brother for a baby that plays and laughs by itself that can entertain her. With the horse's advice, the male twin reaches the baby's location, kills some devs and steals the baby for his sister. Thirdly, the female twin is convinced by the old woman to bring a river that contains many things in water. The male twin complains that he already brought what she asked, but the female twin says that the river can provide them with food by virtue of its many animals. The male twin rides the horse next to a river, enters the water, and out come sheep and goats, part of it flock to the sultan's fields and part to the twins' house, then the black horse emerges from the water. Lastly, the old woman convinces the female twin to set her brother on a quest for a bride called Gülcemile for him. The black horse warns the male twin the task is dangerous, but takes him to Gülcemile's palace and points to the stones in the garden, which are previous victims. Instructed by the horse, the youth knocks on Gülcemile's door and shouts for her. By doing this, his body slowly becomes stone. He shouts three times for Gülcemile, but she does not answer, and his body is turned to stone. The black horse mourns for its master for forty days and forty nights, and Gülcemile speaks, reviving the people in her garden. The men start to argue that Gülcemile is theirs, but a bearded man silences them, saying that Gülcemile belongs to the boy with the horse. The male twin takes Gülcemile on the horse back to his homeland. When they arrive, Gülcemile ponts to the woman buried in the ground, revealing that she is his mother. The male twin rescues the woman and brings her to their house, then invites the sultan for a meal. Gülcemile warns the male twin that the sultan may want to poison him to marry Gülcemile. The twins holds a feast, then the Sultan invites the trio to his palace, and tries to poison the male twin with poisoned food, but the youth tosses the food to a dog, which eats it and dies. The male twin accuses the sultan of trying to kill him, mentions the woman that gave birth to puppies, and shows his own golden hair, proving that he is the sultan's son. The sultan buries the sisters-in-law and the old woman upside down, and makes the golden-haired son his successor.

=== Tuva ===
Russian ethnologist Grigory Potanin recorded a variant from Uryankhay Krai, modern day Tuva, with the title "Мынг хонгор атту Тюмендей и его сынъ Ерь Сару". In the first part of the tale, a being named Tyumendey, under the guise of a Dzhelbag, forces an old man to surrender his three daughters in exchange for his freedom. The old man and his wife convince the girls to fetch fruits in the woods. They return to the yurt and see Dzhelbag. The girls escape by using objects to create magical obstacles to their pursuer. They meet a beaver near a river that carries them across the water. The beaver tells the girl to toss some stones in the river; Dzhelbag drowns. The animal advises them to climb up three fir trees and wait there. In the second part of the story, as the three sisters are sitting on treetops and playing musical instruments, three hunters pass by the trees when water pours down on them. Thinking it rain, they look up and see the maidens. The three sisters marry the three hunters. One day, the third hunter goes away with his brothers-in-law, and asks his wife what she will do for him when he gets back: she will bear a boy with silver neck and golden head. Her sisters become envious, replace the boy for an animal and throw him in the lake. The hunter returns and, seeing the animal, maims, blinds and abandons his wife. The woman regains her limbs and sight by use of a magical herb. She then prepares to rescue her son from the lake. She tries three times, and is successful on the third occasion. She feeds the boy her milk and rubs her tears on his eyes. He recognizes him as his mother and calls himself Er-Saru (Ер-сару).

Folklorist Erika Taube collected another Tuvan tale from a 69-year-old informant in 1969. In this tale, titled "Он ийи гадынныг хаан" or "Хан с двенадцатью женами" (The Khan with Twelve Wives), a khan has 12 wives, but laments that none has given birth to any son. He goes on a journey and finds at first a woman, which he thinks is ugly. He returns to his travels and finds three sisters talking inside a hut, the youngest wishing for a husband that has looked for her, travelled all over the world and suffered all travails. He marries the third sister and she gives birth to twin boys. The other co-wives replace the boys for animals and cast them in the water. The khan returns and, seeing the animals, banishes the thirteenth wife to an island. The boys are found by a childless couple. Years later, the khan sends his eagle to the skies and, when it does not return, he rides on his horse to the island and meets a deep-wrinkled old lady. The old lady says she is a "lady or ruler of fate" and sets the khan on a quest to redeem himself and restore his family. Taube argued that the old lady character as the ruler of fate was "an ancient element" present in this tale, and compared it to similar motifs and figures of Central Asian faiths.

=== Tofalar people ===
In a tale from the Tofalars titled "Три мальчика" ("Three Boys"), an old god wanders the Earth and seeks a woman to marry. He finds three women and inquires about their skills: the first tells she can bake bread for 300 people and there will still be some bread left; the second that she can plant 99 aspens to make skis for the people, and the third that she can bear three sons, the first two will have golden chest and the third a normal human chest. The god marries the third woman and has to go on a hunt. His wife gives birth to a boy with golden chest, who is replaced for a puppy by an evil midwife. The next year, the same happens to her second son. On the third year, she gives birth to a normal human boy, and the god, seeing that his wife failed in her promise, orders her and the son to be sewn inside a cow's hide and thrown in the sea. The cow's hide lands on an island. Mother and son live in the island, and the woman sews the boy a nice hat. The boy gives his hat to a man on the island and gains an ax, an iron stick and a bag. He reads in a book about a rich man who lives with two sons with golden chest. He recognizes that the boys are his elder brothers and goes to save them.

=== Uyghur people ===
In an Uyghur tale titled Mestan Kempir, a childless padishah is married to two wives and has no son. He is advised by his viziers to find a new wife. The padishah visits a city where he finds his prospective bride: a maiden named Aycemal, an old man's daughter. The padishah takes Aycemal with him and marries her as his third queen. Some time later, the padishah goes on a hunt and leaves a pregnant Aycemal alone. The elder co-wife hires the witch Mestan Kempir to get rid of the children as soon as they are born. Aycemal gives birth to twin children, a boy and a girl. On the elder wife's orders, Mestan Kempir takes the sultan's twin children and abandons them in the mountains, putting two puppies in their place to deceive him and humiliate the children's mother. A doe finds the children when it goes to drink water and takes them to its cave. Years later, the padishah goes to hunt in the mountains and the adoptive deer mother guides the monarch to the cave where the children are hidden. The children hide into the cave on seeing the padishah, who tries to convince them to come out. He returns home and tells his co-wives what he experienced in the hunt. The elder co-wives realize the children are Aycemal's children and plan to get rid of them by sending Mestan Kempir. The witch goes to the twins' cave and, while the male twin is away, convinces the girl to search for the branch of a magical tree that is located in the land of the devs. After the witch leaves and the male twin returns from the hunt, the girl asks her brother to fetch the branch from the tree. With the advice from a Hizir (holy man), the male twin brings the branch, plants it near their cave and, the next morning, a green and lush vine sprouts. The next time, Mestan Kempir sends them after a magic girl named Hörlikahan, who lives in a cave on the east side of a mountain. Again, with the Hizir's aid, the male twin brings Hörlikahan to their cave. Time passes, and the padishah passes by the twins' cave again, and Hörlikahan, with her powers, realizes the padishah is the twins' father. Hörlikahan welcomes the monarch, and, in return, he invites them to his palace. Hörlikahan takes the twins to the padishah's palace, and reveals the whole truth, by mocking the idea that a human woman can bear puppies. In return, the padishah is instructed by Hörlikahan to gather every subject in the realm to his palace. Thus, Hörlikahan and the twins wait by the palace doors as every person passes by them. Finally, Aycemal, who had been locked in a cage for her false birth, walks by the twins and a jet of her breastmilk spurts from each of her breasts and into each of the twins' mouths, confirming their parentage. The witch Mestan Kempir and the elder co-wives are then executed.

== See also ==
- The Golden-Haired Children (Turkish folktale)

== Bibliography ==
- Levin, Isidor; Laude-Cirtautas, Ilse. Märchen der Usbeken: Samarkand, Buchara, Taschkent. Eugen Didierichs Verlag, 1986. pp. 182-186. ISBN 9783424007107.
- Gümüş, Şule (2022). "“Muňluk ve Zarlık” destanıyla “Çember Has Güzel” ve “Üç Bacı” masallarındaki benzerlikler". In: Uluslararası Türkçe Edebiyat Kültür Eğitim Dergisi, 11 (2): 644–656. http://dx.doi.org/10.7884/teke.5454 (In Turkish)
