= Jahan-e-Khusrau =

Sufi music festival held in New Delhi

- Dates: February/March
- Locations: New Delhi, India
- Years active: 2001 - Present
- Founders: Muzaffar Ali

Jahan-e-Khusrau (Urdu, Persian: جہاں خسرو, Hindi: जहान-ए-खुसरो) is an annual three-day sufi music festival held in New Delhi, India to commemorate the death anniversary of the saint Amir Khusrau.

== History ==
Jahan-e-Khusrau was started in the year 2001 by noted film director and artist, Muzaffar Ali.

== The festival ==
The festival is held at Arab ki Sarai, Humayun's Tomb Monuments, Delhi — incidentally, this is where Khusrau started the qawwali music tradition in the 13th century AD.

== Performers ==
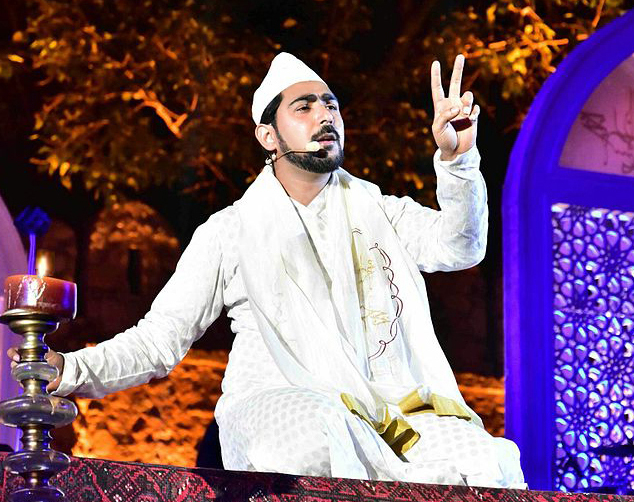
In the festival, an Indian traditional oral storytller Dastangoi artist reciting the "Dastan-e-Amir Khusrau" - 2017

Year - 2001 Dates - 10–11 March Venue - Arab ki Sarai, Humayun Tomb Monuments, New Delhi Artists -

- Rumi Group, IRAN
- Lotfi Bouchnak, TUNISIA
- Abida Parveen, PAKISTAN

Year - 2002 Dates - 8 - 9–10 March Venue - Arab ki Sarai, Humayun Tomb Monuments, New Delhi Artists -

- Kabir Helminski, USA
- Drummers from, SUDAN
- Mahasa Vahdat and the Rumi Group, IRAN
- Sultana Chaudhuri, BANGLADESH
- Whirling Dervishes, TURKEY
- Abida Parveen, PAKISTAN
- Shubha Mudgal, DELHI
- Ghulam Nabi Namtahali, KASHMIR
- Manjari, LUCKNOW
- Samandar Khan, RAJASTHAN
- Noorul Hasan, LUCKNOW

Year - 2003 Dates - 28 February, 1–2 March Venue - Arab ki Sarai, Humayun Tomb Monuments, New Delhi Artists -

- Masood Habibi & group, IRAN
- Whirling Dervishes, TURKEY
- Hassan Hakmoun, MOROCCO
- Farida Parveen BANGLADESH
- Abida Parveen, PAKISTAN
- Zila Khan, DELHI
- Sidi Sufis, GUJARAT
- Ghulam Nabi Namtahali, KASHMIR
- Qutubi Qawwal, DELHI
- Nazeer Khan Warsi, HYDERABAD
- Ghulam Fareed Nizami, DELHI
- Asrar Husain, AJMER
- Muhammad Ahmad Khan Warsi, RAMPUR
- Noorul Hasan, LUCKNOW

Year - 2004 Dates - 26–27 March Venue - Arab ki Sarai, Humayun Tomb Monuments, New Delhi Artists -

- Masood Habibi, IRAN
- Shye BenTzur, ISRAEL
- Abida Parveen, PAKISTAN
- Ila Arun, MUMBAI
- Astad Deboo, MUMBAI
- Shubha Mudgal, DELHI

Year - 2005 Dates - 4 - 5–6 March Venue - Arab ki Sarai, Humayun Tomb Monuments, New Delhi Artists -

- Mehmet Kemiksiz, TURKEY
- Abida Parveen, PAKISTAN
- Shafqat Ali Khan, PAKISTAN
- Shye BenTzur, ISRAEL
- Azam Ali, USA
- Masood Habibi, IRAN
- Zila Khan, DELHI
- Vidya Rao, DELHI
- Shujaat Husain Khan, DELHI
- Dadi Pudumji, DELHI

Year - 2006 Dates - 4 - 5–6 March Venue - Arab ki Sarai, Humayun Tomb Monuments, New Delhi

Year - 2007 Dates - 30–31 March & 1 April Venue - Quli Khan's Tomb, Mehrauli Archeological Park, New Delhi Artists -

- Wendy Jehlan, USA
- Sussan Deyhim, USA
- Abida Parveen, PAKISTAN
- Malini Awasthi, LUCKNOW
- Shauqat Ali & Group, LUDHIANA
- Jaaved Jaaferi, MUMBAI
- Rekha Bhardwaj, MUMBAI
- Meeta Pandit, DELHI
- Nizami Brothers, DELHI

Year - 2008 Jahan e Khusrau was not held

Year - 2009 Date - 19 October Venue - SKICC, Shrinagar, Kashmir

Year - 2010 Dates - 26 - 27 - 28 Feb Venue - Arab ki Sarai, Humayun Tomb Monuments, New Delhi Artists -

- Tamboura Troupe, EGYPT
- Omar Faruk Ttekbelik, USA
- Masaka Ono, JAPAN
- Sanam Marvi, PAKISTAN
- Abida Parveen, PAKISTAN
- Malini Awasthi, LUCKNOW
- Samandar Khan, RAJASTHAN
- Rabbi Shergill, PUNJAB
- Astad Deboo, MUMBAI
- Radhika Chopra, DELHI

Year - 2011 Dates - 15–16 & 17 April Venue - Southbank Centre, London

Year - 2011 Dates - 11–13 March Venue - Arab ki Sarai, Humayun Tomb Monuments, New Delhi Artists -

- Azalea Ray, CANADA
- Dalahoo Ensemble, IRAN
- Shafqat Ali Khan, PAKISTAN
- Sami Brothers, PAKISTAN
- Manjari, LUCKNOW
- Wajahat Husain Badayuni, UTTAR PRADESH
- Ustad Shujaat Husain Khan, DELHI
- Hans raj Hans, PUNJAB
- Malini Awasthi, LUCKNOW
- Chand Nizami, DELHI

Year - 2012 Dates - 2 - 3–4 March Venue - Arab ki Sarai, Humayun Tomb Monuments, New Delhi Artists -

- Andrea Grmmelli, ITALY
- Ali Zafar, PAKISTAN
- Shafqat Ali Khan, PAKISTAN
- Abida Parveen, PAKISTAN
- Zia Nath, MUMBAI
- Indira Naik, MUMBAI
- Murad Ali, LUCKNOW
- Vidhi Sharma, DELHI
- Rajesh Pandey, DELHI
- Shivani Varma, DELHI
- Hans raj Hans, PUNJAB

Year - 2012 Dates - 21–22 October Venue - Central Park, Jaipur

Year - 2013 Dates - 1- 2–3 March Venue - Arab ki Sarai, Humayun Tomb Monuments, New Delhi Artists -

- Mercan Dede, CANADA
- Shafqat Ali Khan, PAKISTAN
- Abida Parveen, PAKISTAN
- Sonam Kalra, DELHI
- Malini Awasthi, LUCKNOW
- Astha Dikshit, DELHI
- Deveshi Sehgal, DELHI

Year - 2013 Dates - 5–6 October Venue - Central Park, Jaipur

Year - 2017 Dates - 24 - 25–26 March Venue - Arab ki Sarai, Humayun Tomb Monuments, New Delhi Artists -

- Hans raj Hans, PUNJAB
- Sonam Kalra, DELHI
- Malini Awasthi, LUCKNOW
- Ustad Iqbal Ahmad Khan, DELHI
- Deveshi Sehgal, DELHI
- Syed Sahil Agha, DELHI
- Daler Mehndi, PUNJAB

Year - 2018 Dates - 9 - 10–11 March Venue - Arab ki Sarai, Humayun Tomb Monuments, New Delhi Artists - YAMUNA - Dariya Prem Ka : Part 1 A dance ballet directed by Muzaffar Ali,

- Barnali Chatopadhyya, *Archana Shah, *Astha Dixit & Group.
- Aalamato Group, Iran
- Malini Awasthi, Lucknow
- Kanwar Grewal, Punjab
- World Ethnic Music Ensemble with Murad Ali
- Pooja Ghaitonde, Mumbai
- Barnal Chatopadhyya, Kolkata
- Kailash Kher's Kailasa, Mumbai

YAMUNA - Dariya Prem Ka : Part 2

- Shuba Mudgal, Delhi
- Syed Sahil Agha, Delhi
- Hans Raj Hans, Punjab

Year - 2019 Dates - 8 - 9–10 March Venue - Arab ki Sarai, Humayun Tomb Monuments, New Delhi Artists -

- Minu Bakshi, Delhi
- Ganganama - The Circle of Life

Sanjukta Sinha & Kadamb Ensemble

- Satinder Sartaj, Punjab
- Roohani Sisters, Delhi
- Kanwar Grewal, Punjab
- Shahid Niyati & Sami Niyati, Rampur
- Syed Sahil Agha, Delhi
- Javed Ali, Mumbai
