= Zhyrau =

A zhyrau (also, jïraw) is a singer of epic poetry in the Kipchak languages and cultures of Central Asia, in such countries as Kazakhstan, Uzbekistan, and Karakalpakstan. In the latter culture two such kinds of singers of dastan ("tale, narrative") are distinguished: the baqsï sings lyrical epics containing stories about love and adventure (which Karl Reichl compares to medieval Western romance), accompanied by the dutar; zhyrau sing heroic epics, accompanied by the kobyz.
