= Baqsï =

A baqsy (Karakalpak: baqsı; Kazakh: бақсы; Kyrgyz: бакшы) is a singer of epic poetry in the Kipchak languages and cultures of Central Asia, in such countries as Kazakhstan, Uzbekistan, and Karakalpakstan. In the latter culture two such kinds of singers of dastan ('tale, narrative') are distinguished: the baqsy sings lyrical epics containing stories about love and adventure (which Karl Reichl compares to medieval Western romance), accompanied by the dutar; zhyrau sing heroic epics, accompanied by the kobyz. The baqsy can be accompanied by a second musician, who plays the ghijak.

The name itself indicates a connection to an earlier shamanism, since the term in Kazakh still denotes 'faith healer' rather than 'singer', as it does in other Turkic languages.
