= Sir Syed Ahmad Khan: The Messiah =

Indian biographical film

- Directed by: Masarrat Ali; Shoaib Hussain Choudhary
- Written by: Shoaib Hussain Choudhary; Mutyim Kamalee
- Based on: Hayat-i-Javed by Altaf Hussain Hali
- Produced by: Shoaib Hussain Choudhary; Masarrat Ali; Parveen Akhtar Ali
- Starring: Shoaib Hussain Choudhary; Zarina Wahab; Syed Sahil Agha; Akshay Anand; Deepak Parashar
- Release date: 19 December 2024
- Running time: 168 minutes
- Country: India
- Language: Urdu

Sir Syed Ahmad Khan: The Messiah is a 2024 Indian Urdu-language biographical film directed by Masarrat Ali and Shoaib Hussain Choudhary. It is an adaptation of Altaf Hussain Hali's Hayat-i-Javed, a biography of Indian social reformer and the founder of Aligarh Muslim University, Sir Syed Ahmed Khan. It is produced by Masarrat Ali, Parveen Akhtar Ali and Choudhary and streamed on Apple TV. It stars Choudhary as Sir Syed Ahmed Khan, Zarina Wahab as Azizunnisa Begum, Syed Sahil Agha as Shibli Nomani, Akshay Anand as Syed Mehmood and Deepak Parashar as Khwaja Fariduddin.

== Cast ==
- Shoaib Hussain Choudhary as Sir Syed Ahmed Khan
  - Swayam Joshi as young Syed Ahmed Khan
- Zarina Wahab as Azizunnisa Begum
- Syed Sahil Agha as Shibli Nomani
- Akshay Anand as Syed Mehmood
- Samvedna Suwalka as Musharraf Jahan, wife of Syed Mehmood
- Deepak Parashar as Khwaja Fariduddin
- Javed Abedi as Raja Jai Kishan
- Nilofar Gesawat as Fakrun Nisa
- Mohammed Yaqub Ghauri as Mushtaq Ahmad Kamboh
- Syed Ubaid Hussain as Surendranath Banerji
- Azhar Iqbal as Akbar Allahabadi
- Naiyar Jafri as Mehdi Ali Khan
- Arif Zakaria as Nawab Mehmood of Bijnore
- Leena Sharma as Umrao Begum
- Mir Sarwar as Muneer Khan
