= Indira Naik =

Sufi and ghazal singer

Indira Naik is a Sufi and ghazal singer from Mumbai, India. She is classically trained in the Patiala Gayaki. She has been performing ghazals, bhajans and Sufi for more than 20 years in India and abroad. Sufism is an inspiration for her.

== Early life ==
Indira was exposed to music at a very early age as her father is a Sarod and Sitar player and mother a Bharat Natyam guru.

Winning in her school singing competitions made her parents and herself take music seriously and Indira started training under Pt. Satyanarayan Singh of the Patiala gharana. Later Mohinderjeet Singh train her voice. Over the years, she studied under Dayal Thakur and ghazals under the late Vithal Rao of Hyderabad.

== Album releases ==
- Krishna Krishna - Bhajan album (1994)
- Run Jhun - Gujrati Sugam Sangeet (1994)
- Aap Ke Liye - Ghazal album (1998)
- Tassavur - Ghazal album (2009)

== Other ==
- Playback for TV serials – Saaya, Alaap, Phir Bhi Dil Hai Hindustani, Bhabhi
- Playback for commercials like MDH masala, Flair pens, etc.
- Gana Kala Vani Awards from Trinity Arts Festival
- Playback for the film – Main Madhuri Dixit Banna Chahti Hoon
- Playback for the film division documentary on Kashmir – Suraj Ka Parivar

== Concerts in India ==
- World Urdu Conference, Hyderabad
- RAPA Awards, Mumbai
- International Public Relations Society Conference, New Delhi
- Andhra Pradesh Tourism Annual Ghazal Festival, Hyderabad
- Meerabai Foundation, Chittorgarh
- Tarannum Society, Gurgaon
- Hanuman Jayanti Concert, Rajasthan, shared the performance with Shri Anup Jalota

== International concerts ==
- Rehma Community Service (Toronto, Canada)
- Independence Day Celebration, Indian High Commission (Chicago)
- Hindu Samaj (Portugal)
- International Peace Day Santa Fe, New Mexico, U.S.)
- Maharashtra Mandal Ganesh Chaturthi Festival (London, UK)
- International Council for Cultural Relations (Brunei)
- Asian Metropolitan Association (Chicago)
- Aligarh University Alumni Association (Michigan)
