= Uysal–Walker Archive of Turkish Oral Narrative =

The Uysal–Walker Archive of Turkish Oral Narrative is a searchable archive of oral Turkish literature. The archive is housed in the Southwest Collection/Special Collections Library of Texas Tech University in Lubbock, Texas, United States. It includes links to numerous audio recordings in MP3 format and images. There are also some academic articles in English.

== History ==
Professor Walker of the English department at Texas Tech University visited Ankara in 1961–62 with his wife Barbara, under the terms of a Fulbright Grant. While there, he met Ahmet Edip Uysal, Professor of English at Ankara University. Shortly thereafter, they began working together towards an archive. The project culminated in the Uysal–Walker Archive of Turkish Oral Narrative. After a decade of fieldwork in many villages, the original founders began focusing on organization and permanent storage of their information. This led them to eventually donate their holdings to Texas Tech in 1980.
