= Roohani Sisters =

Female sufi singers

- Origin: India
- Genres: Sufi; Kafi; Ghazal; Qawwali; Bhajan; Punjabi Folk
- Occupations: Singer; Composer
- Instrument: Vocals
- Years active: 2009–present
- Members: Jagriti Luthra Prasanna; Sonakshi Jain
- Website: roohanisisters.com

Roohani Sisters are a Sufi singing from New Delhi, India.

== Overview ==
The Roohani Sisters rendered many poetry accredited to Kabir, Ramdas and Mirabai - the medieval Indian saint to which most of them are self-attribute. Their poetries emphasize the transitory nature of life, non-attachment to the mundane, the inevitability of death, and salvation through devotion. They performed Nirgun Bhakti Sangeet. This form of worship was propagated by Nirgun saints through their writings and songs by breaking away the oppressive caste and gender hierarchy associated with temple worship of icons.

The Roohani Sisters mostly play devotional music. Their music style is a fusion of different music genres consisting of Bhajans and Sufi renditions.

They started performing in 2009 together in India and outside, and their first international performance was in 2017 at the Dhaka International Folk Fest. They sing mainly Sufiyana Qalams, Qawwali, Kafi, Ghazals, Bhajan and Punjabi Folk in traditional style merging it with the Jugalbandi style of Indian classical and semi-classical music. They sing in various languages such as Urdu, Hindi, Punjabi, and Persian.

== Early life ==
Prasanna and Negi were born and raised in a Hindu family in Delhi, India. Prasanna has origins from Punjab and Negi is from Uttarakhand.

Prasanna has taken her basic Raagdari Taleem under Mrs. Ketaki Banerjee from Kirana Gharana. She learnt Indian classical music from Shri. Ritesh Mishra and his father Padma Bhushan Pt.Rajan and Sajan Mishra of the Banaras Gharana. She is also a sincere disciple of Ustaad Sakhawat Hussain, Grandson of Padma Bhushan Ustaad Mushtaq Hussain Khan of Rampur-Sahaswan gharana from whom she learnt the technicalities of Sufi and Ghazal Gayaki.

Negi, inspired by her grandfather Shri Shiv Charan Pandey, started learning Indian classical music at an early age. She learnt Indian Classical Music from Lt. Shri Vipin Mudgaliya and Smt.Indu Mudgal of Gandharva Mahavidyalaya, New Delhi and Mrs.Ketaki Banerjee from Kirana Gharana. She learned Ghazal and semi-classical from Smt. Charanjeet Soni and Sufiyana Gayaki under the able guidance of her guru Lt. Ustad Iqbal Ahmad Khan, Khalifa of Dilli Gharana.

Negi appeared in various Indian TV reality shows like Voice of India, Sa Re Ga Ma Pa Challenge 2005 and Indian Idol.

== Career ==
They performed at Jahan-e-Khusrau to commemorate the death anniversary of the saint Amir Khusrau in Delhi.

=== "Jogan Hoon Shiv" ===
In addition to their Sufi repertoire, Roohani Sisters released a Shiv bhajan titled "Jogan Hoon Shiv" on their YouTube channel. This devotional composition captures the essence of devotion to Lord Shiva.

- In 2022, they performed at Swasthyam Global Wellness Celebration in Pune.
- In 2022 they performed at the International Kullu Dussehra Festival, Kullu Himachal Pradesh.
- They released their new songs, "Dildaar Sadke" on 2 November 2022 under the label of Zee Music Company.
- In 2022, they performed at the 26th edition of the Fez Festival of World Sacred Music,Morocco.
- They released their new songs, "Karam Farma De Maula" and "Mawaan Labhdiyan Nai" on their YouTube Channel.
- In 2021, they performed at Dada Saheb Phalke International Film Festival in Mumbai.
- In 2021, they performed in Peer Prayi Jaane Na, a cultural program to commemorate the death anniversary of Mahatma Gandhi, at the Lokrang Festival in Bhopal.
- In 2020, they performed at Wajid Ali Shah Festival in Lucknow, UP.
- In 2019, they performed at Jahan-e-Khusrau, Jaipur Literature Festival, Dilli Durbaar, Sahitya Aajtak and Jashn-e-Adab.
- In 2019, they performed at Swarganga Music Festival in collaboration with Pracheen Kala Kendra, Chandigarh.
- In 2019, they performed at Ahmedabad International Literature Festival in Ahmedabad, Gujarat.
- They released their song “Bedardan” on 12 March 2019 under the T-Series label.
- Their music video "Mennu Ishq Samajh Na Aave" was composed by Dj Sheizwood and released by Apeksha Films & Music on YouTube.
- In 2019, they performed "Amrit Rasvaadan" (Sufi Night) organized by JMV Global Foundation in association with the Club Patio.
- In 2018, they performed in New Year Celebration at CM Arvind Kejriwal’s Residence.
- In 2018, they performed in Aambrotsave organized at Central Park, Connaught Place, New Delhi.
- They came live during a Thalassemia awareness initiative curated by SUBURB in association with Honda Motorcycle and Scooter India, Private Limited.
- In 2017, they performed at Dhaka International Folk Fest, 2017 in Bangladesh.
- They also have performed at ICCR, SPIC MACAY and Sangeet Natak Akademi's music festivals.

== Awards and recognitions ==
- Narishakti Puruskar (2019)
- REX Karmaveer Global Fellowship & Karmaveer Chakra Award (2019)

== Personal life ==
In 2012, Prasanna married Sh. Rajesh Prasanna, a flute artist that performed in various national and international arenas. He is the son of Indian classical flautist and shehnai player Pt. Rajendra Prasanna from Benares Gharana.

In 2012, Negi married Sh. Rajneesh Negi, founder of Marketing Edtech platform PMT India Learning and moved to Dehradun.
