= Dastan =

Form of oral history in West and Central Asia

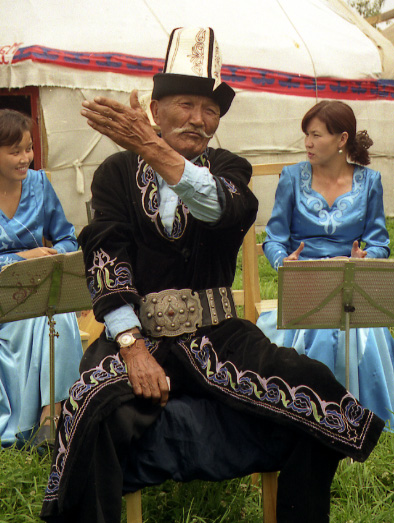
A traditional Kyrgyz manaschi performing part of the epic poem (dastan) at a yurt camp in Karakol

Dastan (Persian: داستان, romanized: dâstân, lit. 'story, tale') is an ornate form of oral history, an epic, from Central Asia, Iran, Turkey and Azerbaijan.

A dastan is generally centered on one individual who protects his tribe or his people from an outside invader or enemy, although only occasionally can this figure be traced back to a historical person. This main character sets an example of how one should act, and the dastan becomes a teaching tool — for example the Sufi master and Turkic poet Ahmed Yesevi said "Let the scholars hear my wisdom, treating my words like a dastan". Alongside the wisdom, each dastan is rich with cultural history of interest to scholars.

During the Russian conquest of Central Asia, many new dastans were created to protest the Russian occupation. It is possible that they came into contact and influenced each other. According to Turkish historian Hasan Bülent Paksoy, the Bolsheviks tried to destroy these symbols of culture by only publishing them in insufficient quantities and in a distorted form "in order to weaken the heroic impact".

A notable dastan is Korkut Ata of the Oghuz Turks — which may have been created as early as the beginning of the 13th century.

In Karakalpak and other Turkic cultures, there are two kinds of dastan: the baqsï sings lyrical epics containing stories about love and adventure (which Karl Reichl compares to medieval Western romance), accompanied by the dutar; zhyrau sing heroic epics, accompanied by the kobyz.

== See also ==
- Alpamysh
- Baqsï
- Dastangoi
- Epic of Manas
- Epic of Koroghlu
- List of Urdu prose dastans
- Yazidi literature § Dastan
- Zhyrau
