= The Tale of the Four Dervishes =

Early-13th century fairy tales by Amir Khusro

The Tale of the Four Dervishes (Persian: قصۀ چهار درویش Qissa-ye Chahār Darvēsh, lit. 'The Story of Four Dervishes'), known as Bāgh-o Bahār (باغ و بہار, lit. 'Garden and Spring') in Urdu, is a collection of allegorical stories by Amir Khusro written in Persian in the early 13th century.

While legend says that Amir Khusro was the author, the tales were written long after his death. Legend has it that Amir Khusro's mentor and Sufi saint Nizamuddin Auliya had fallen ill. To cheer him up, Amir Khusro started telling him a series of stories in the style of the One Thousand and One Nights.

== Style ==
The book is in some ways similar to the Thousand and One Nights in its method of framing and linking unfinished stories within each other. The central character is a king, Azad Bakht, who falls into depression after thinking about his own mortality, and so sets out from his palace seeking wise men. He comes upon four dervishes in a cemetery, and listens to their fantastical stories. Each Dervish narrates his own story, which is basically on love and fidelity in their own past lives. When the fourth dervish finishes his tale, the king Azadbakht suddenly learns that one of his wives has just given birth to his son. Overwhelmed with joy, the king orders to arrange a great feast. With the help of the great king of jinns, Malik Syahpal, Azadbakht marries all the separated lovers to one another: the merchant's son from Yemen to the princess of Damsyik, the prince of Fars to the princess of Basra, the prince of Ajam to the princess of Farang, the prince of Nimroz to the princess of jinns, and the prince of China to the daughter of the courtier, who was kidnapped by Malik Sadik. Everyone happily achieves the fulfillment of his or her desire.

== Translations ==
These stories were originally written in Persian by Amir Khusro as Qissa-ye Chahār Darvēsh. It was initially translated by Mir Husain Ata Tehseen into Urdu as Nav Tarz-e-Murassaa (نو طرزِ مُرصّع, "New Ornate Style") but the language was a highly literate one and was not understood well enough by general public to be enjoyed. In 1801, College of Fort William in Calcutta started a project translating Indian literature. Mr. John Borthwick Gilchrist, a famous scholar of literature, asked Mir Amman, an employee of the college, to translate it into the Urdu language. Mir Amman translated it from Persian into everyday Urdu, under the title Bāgh o Bahār. Later, in 1857, Duncan Forbes retranslated it into English. The translation of Mir Amman is still enjoyed as a classical work of Urdu Literature for the common daily language of its time. In 1859 it was translated into Polish by Aleksander Chodźko as "Padyszach i czterech derwiszów".

== Adaptations ==
The Indian films Char Darvesh (1933) by Prafulla Ghosh and Char Dervesh (1964) by Homi Wadia were based on the stories.

== See also ==
- One Thousand and One Nights
- Hamzanama
- Persian Literature
