= Mir Amman =

Indian translator (1748–1806)

- میر امن
- Born: 1748; Delhi, Mughal Empire
- Died: 1806
- Years active: 1801–1806
- Notable work: Bagh O Bahar

Mir Amman (1748–1806) was an employee of Fort William College at Calcutta, variously also known as Mir Amman of Delhi, Mir Amman of Dilhi, Mir Amman Dihlavi, and Meer Ummun.

He was best known for his translation of Amir Khusro's classic epic Qissa Chahar Dervish (The Tale of the Four Dervishes). His translation is considered classic literature itself for its use of contemporary Urdu, and was done on the request of John Borthwick Gilchrist, an English scholar of literature of those days. It in turn was widely translated into English during the 19th century and even Malay in the 1840s.

== Partial publishing history ==
- Bagh o Buhar, a Translation into the Hindoostanee Tongue of the Celebrated Persian Tale "Qissui Chuhar Durwesh," by Meer Ummun, under the superintendence of J. Gilchrist, Calcutta, 1804. This version was reissued as follows: 2nd edition, Calcutta 1813; 3rd edition, Calcutta 1824. Other editions: Cawnpore 1833; Calcutta 1834; Madras 1840; Calcutta 1847; Cawnpore 1860; Calcutta 1863; Delhi 1882; etc.
- Bāgh o Buhār; consisting of entertaining Tales in the Hindûstǎni Language. By Mir Amman of Dihli, one of the learned Natives formerly attached to the College of Fort Williams at Calcutta. A new Edition, carefully collated with original Manuscripts. . . . to which is added a Vocabulary of all the Words occurring in the Work, Duncan Forbes, London, 1846. Also reissued in multiple later editions and revisions.
- The Bagh-o-Behar, Translated into English, for the Use of Students, W. C. Hollings, W. Thacker & Co., St. Andrews Library, Calcutta, and London, 1851.
- The Bāgh o Bahār, or the Garden and the Spring; being the Adventures of King Āzād Bakht, and the Four Derweshes; literally translated from the Urdú of Mir Amman, of Delhi. With copious explanatory Notes, and an introductory Preface, Edward B. Eastwick, London : Sampson Low & Marston, 1852.
- The Hindústáni Text of Mír Amman, Edited in Roman Type, with Notes and an introductory Chapter on the Use of the Roman Character in Oriental Languages, M. Williams, London, 1859.
