= S. P. Balasubrahmanyam filmography =

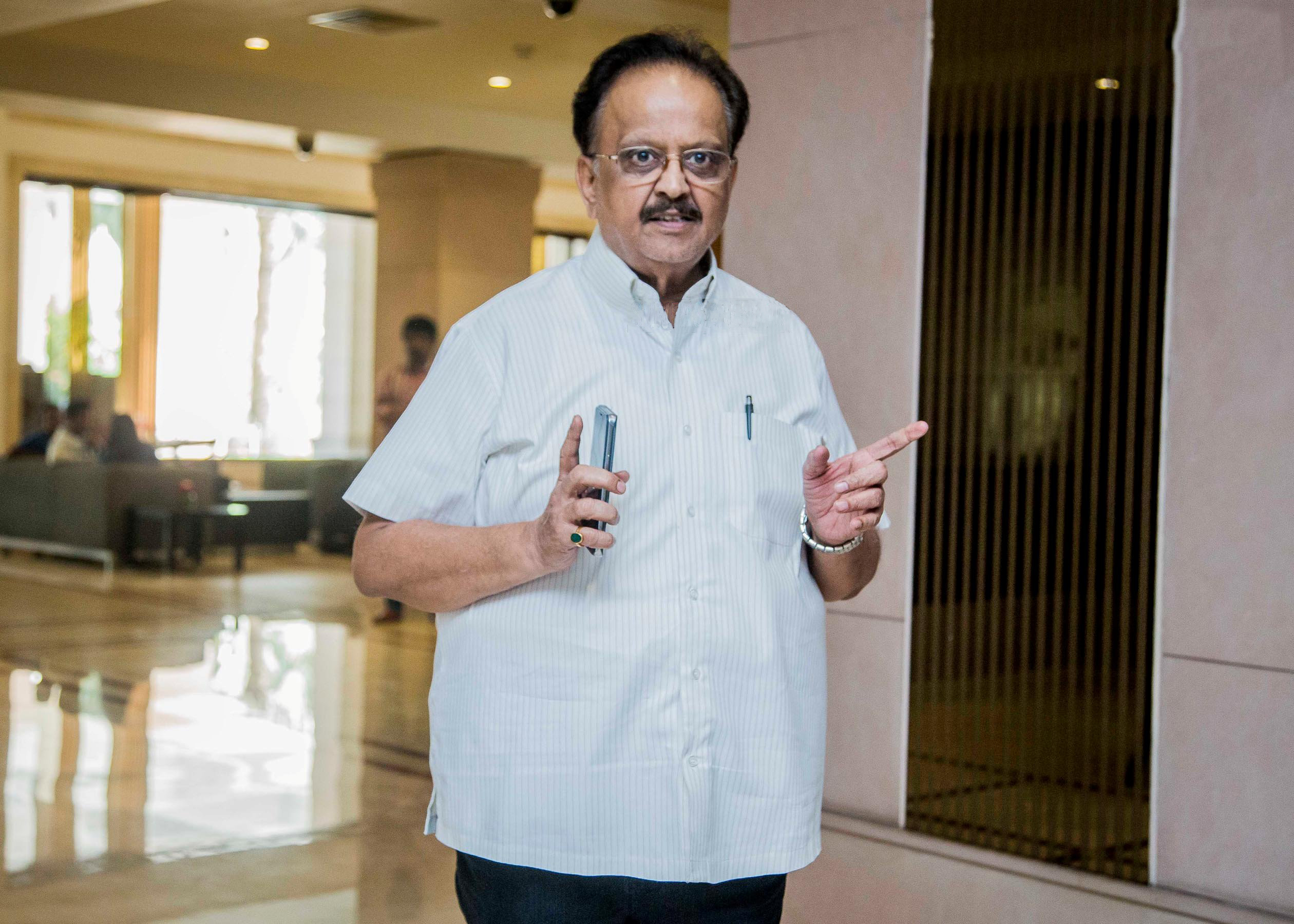
S. P. Balasubrahmanyam in 2016

Filmography of Indian film singer, actor, music director and film producer S. P. Balasubrahmanyam.

== As actor ==
=== Films ===
| Year | Film | Role | Language | Notes |
|---|---|---|---|---|
| 1971 | Mohammed Bin Tuglaq | | Tamil | Guest appearance |
| 1972 | Muhammad bin Tughluq | | Telugu | Guest appearance |
| 1981 | Pakkinti Ammayi | Bala Raju | Telugu | |
| 1981 | Raja Paarvai | Guest Appearance | Tamil | Guest appearance |
| 1982 | Baalondu Chaduranga | | Kannada | |
| 1982 | Malle Pandiri | Sheik Moses Murthy | Telugu | |
| 1983 | Thirugu Baana | Himself | Kannada | Guest appearance in song "Ide Naadu Ide Bhashe" |
| 1987 | Manathil Uruthi Vendum | Doctor | Tamil | |
| 1988 | Vivaha Bhojanambu | | Telugu | Guest appearance |
| 1988 | Mithileya Seetheyaru | Himself | Kannada | Guest appearance |
| 1988 | Kallu | | Telugu | Guest appearance |
| 1989 | Prema | Satya Rao | Telugu | |
| 1989 | Chennapatnam Chinnollu | Himself | Telugu | |
| 1990 | Keladi Kanmani | A. R. Rangaraj | Tamil | |
| 1990 | Palaivana Ragangal | | Tamil | |
| 1990 | Thiyagu | | Tamil | |
| 1991 | Sigaram | Damodar | Tamil | |
| 1992 | Gunaa | Police officer | Tamil | |
| 1992 | Palaivana Raagangal | | Tamil | |
| 1992 | Parvataalu Paanakalu | Paanakalu | Telugu | |
| 1992 | Pellante Noorella Panta | Chakravarthy | Telugu | |
| 1992 | Thalaivasal | Shanmugasundaram | Tamil | |
| 1992 | Bharathan | Ramkumar | Tamil | |
| 1993 | Thiruda Thiruda | Lakshmi Narayanan CBI | Tamil | |
| 1993 | Muddina Maava | Ramayya | Kannada | |
| 1993 | Shabash Ramu | Himself | Telugu | Guest appearance |
| 1994 | Kaadhalan | Kathiresan | Tamil | |
| 1995 | Raja Hamsa | Doctor and family friend | Telugu | |
| 1995 | Paattu Padava | Murali | Tamil | |
| 1995 | Baalondu Chaduranga | | Kannada | |
| 1995 | Kalyanothsava | | Kannada | |
| 1996 | Kadhal Desam | Divya's father | Tamil | |
| 1996 | Myna | | Telugu | |
| 1996 | Pavitra Bandham | Viswanath | Telugu | |
| 1996 | Avvai Shanmughi | Family doctor and relative | Tamil | Guest appearance |
| 1996 | Kandaen Seethayae | Police officer | Tamil | unreleased |
| 1997 | Pellivaramandi | Hero's father | Telugu | |
| 1997 | Prena | | Telugu | |
| 1997 | Ullaasam | Thangiah | Tamil | |
| 1997 | Ratchagan | LIC Padmanabhan | Tamil | |
| 1997 | Wife of V. Varaprasad | Varaprasad, Vineeth's grandfather | Telugu | |
| 1997 | Minsara Kanavu | Thangadurai | Tamil | |
| 1997 | Periya Manushan | Doctor | Tamil | |
| 1997 | Nandhini | Rangaswamy | Tamil | |
| 1997 | Aaro Pranam | Chanti's father | Telugu | |
| 1998 | Rajahamsa | | Telugu | |
| 1998 | Ooyala | Doctor | Telugu | |
| 1998 | Pellaadi Choopista | Himself | Telugu | |
| 1998 | Jolly | Teacher | Tamil | |
| 1998 | Padutha Theeyaga | Gautham Kumar | Telugu | |
| 1998 | Mangalyam Tantunanena | Vishwanath | Kannada | |
| 1998 | Kanasalu Neene Manasalu Neene | Himself | Kannada | |
| 1999 | Maha Edabidangi | | Kannada | |
| 1999 | Deergha Sumangali Bhava | Family friend to Dasari's family | Telugu | |
| 1999 | Pedda Manushulu | | Telugu | |
| 1999 | Maya / Jayasoorya | Bomma Rangan | Tamil/Kannada | |
| 1999 | Mechanic Mavayya | Srivatsav | Telugu | |
| 2000 | Goppinti Alludu | SVR | Telugu | |
| 2000 | Manasu Paddanu Kaani | Swati's father | Telugu | |
| 2000 | Mundaithe Oora Habba | | Kannada | |
| 2000 | Devullu | | Telugu | |
| 2000 | Priyamaanavale | Vishwanath | Tamil | |
| 2001 | Chirujallu | Durga Prasad | Telugu | |
| 2002 | Indra | Himself | Telugu | Cameo appearance |
| 2002 | Padaharella Ammayi | | Telugu | |
| 2002 | April Maadhathil | himself | Tamil | Cameo appearance |
| 2003 | Magic Magic 3D | Acharya | Tamil | |
| 2003 | Fools | | Telugu | Guest appearance |
| 2003 | Maha Yedabidangi | Ramachandra | Kannada | |
| 2006 | Mayabazaar | Kubera | Telugu | |
| 2006 | Roommates | Himself | Telugu | Cameo appearance |
| 2006 | Savira Mettilu | | Kannada | |
| 2007 | En Uyirinum Melana | Vijayarangam | Tamil | |
| 2007 | Kalyanothsava | Army Captain | Kannada | |
| 2007 | Malle Pandiri | | Telugu | |
| 2007 | Hetthare Hennanne Herabeku | Anand Rao | Kannada | |
| 2008 | Inthi Ninna Preethiya | | Kannada | Cameo appearance |
| 2010 | Naanayam | CEO Viswanath | Tamil | |
| 2011 | Shakti | Vijayaraya | Telugu | |
| 2012 | Devasthanam | Sambamurthy | Telugu | |
| 2012 | Mithunam | Appa Dasu | Telugu | |
| 2014 | Thirudan Police | Professor | Tamil | Guest appearance |
| 2015 | Moone Moonu Varthai | Subramaniam | Tamil | |
| 2015 | Moodu Mukkallo Cheppalante | Subramaniam | Telugu | |
| 2018 | Kinar / Keni | Himself | Malayalam / Tamil | Cameo appearance |
| 2018 | Devadas | Chairman Seetharamayya | Telugu | Cameo appearance |

=== Television ===
| Name | Language | Channel | Notes |
| Nadhi Enge Pogiradhu | Tamil | Vijay TV | TV Serial |
| Jannal-Adutha Veetu Kavithaigal | Tamil | Sun TV | TV serial |
| Chinna Chinna Aasai - Ganga | Tamil | Sun TV | TV serial |
| Vaanam Paadi | Tamil | Kalaignar TV | Music show |
| Padutha Theeyaga | Telugu | ETV telugu | Music show |
| Swarabhishekam | Telugu | | Serial |
| Endaro Mahanubhavulu | Telugu | | Serial |
| Ennodu Pattu Paadungal | Tamil | Jaya TV | Music show |
| Edhe Thumbi Haaduvenu | Kannada | ETV Kannada | Music show |
| Azhagu | Tamil | Sun tV | TV serial (Special Appearance) |

== Dubbing artist ==
| Year | Film | Language | Actor | Notes |
|---|---|---|---|---|
| 1976 | Manmadha Leelai | Telugu | Kamal Haasan | |
| 1981 | Nalugu Stambhalata | Telugu | Naresh | |
| 1982 | Gandhi | Telugu (dubbed) | Ben Kingsley | |
| 1983 | Nelavanka | Telugu | Rajesh | |
| 1983 | Ananda Bhairavi | Telugu | Girish Karnad | |
| 1986 | Sippikkul Muthu | Tamil | Kamal Haasan | Only for Tamil version |
| 1987 | Nayakudu | Telugu | Kamal Haasan | Only for Telugu version |
| 1988 | Aadade Aadharam | Telugu | Visu | |
| 1988 | Srimathi Oka Bahumathi | Telugu | Visu | |
| 1988 | Sathya | Tamil | Kitty | |
| 1988 | Rudraveena | Telugu | Gemini Ganesan | |
| 1988 | Trinetrudu | Telugu | Kulbhushan Kharbhanda | |
| 1990 | Michael Madana Kama Rajan | Telugu | Kamal Haasan | |
| 1990 | Illu Illalu Pillalu | Telugu | Visu | |
| 1991 | Aditya 369 | Telugu | Tinu Anand | |
| 1991 | Gunaa | Telugu | Kamal Haasan | |
| 1991 | Chaitanya | Telugu | Raghuvaran | |
| 1992 | Kshatriya Putrudu | Telugu | Kamal Haasan | |
| 1996 | Bhamane Sathyabhamane | Telugu | Kamal Haasan | |
| 1996 | Bharateeyudu | Telugu | Kamal Haasan | |
| 1997 | Annamayya | Telugu | Suman | |
| 1997 | Iddaru | Telugu (dubbed) | Mohanlal | Dubbed version of Tamil film Iruvar |
| 1997 | V. I. P. | Telugu (dubbed) | Anupam Kher | |
| 1998 | Harikrishnans | Tamil (dubbed) | Mohanlal | Dubbed version of Malayalam film Harikrishnans |
| 2000 | Sri Sai Mahima | Telugu | Sai Prakash | |
| 2000 | Thenali | Telugu (dubbed) | Kamal Haasan | |
| 2001 | Abhay | Telugu (dubbed) | Kamal Haasan | |
| 2002 | Panchatanthiram | Telugu (dubbed) | Kamal Haasan | |
| 2003 | Sathyame Sivam | Telugu | Kamal Haasan | |
| 2004 | Sri Anjaneyam | Telugu | Arjun Sarja | |
| 2005 | Athadu | Telugu | Nassar | |
| 2005 | Mumbai Xpress | Telugu (dubbed) | Kamal Haasan | |
| 2006 | Raghavan | Telugu | Kamal Haasan | Telugu Version of the movie Vettaiyaadu Vilaiyaadu |
| 2007 | Sri Satyanarayana Swamy | Telugu | Suman | |
| 2008 | Slumdog Millionaire | Tamil (dubbed) | Anil Kapoor | |
| 2008 | Dasavathaaram | Telugu (dubbed) | Kamal Haasan | For all non-English speaking characters played by Kamal Haasan |
| 2008 | Kathanayakudu | Telugu | Rajinikanth | Bilingual film; Rajinikanth dubbed for himself in the Tamil version (2008) |
| 2009 | Kalavaramaye Madilo | Telugu | Vikram Gokhale | |
| 2010 | Manmadha Baanam | Telugu (dubbed) | Kamal Haasan | |
| 2011 | Sri Rama Rajyam | Tamil (dubbed) | Nandamuri Balakrishna | Only for Tamil version |
| 2018 | Chinna Babu | Telugu (dubbed) | Sathyaraj | |

== Producer ==
- Subha Sankalpam (1995)

== Presenter ==
- Aditya 369 (1991)

== Distributor ==
He was credited as a distributor for films produced by his son S. P. Charan.

- Mazhai (2005)
- Naanayam (2010)
