= Sivalenka Krishna Prasad =

Indian film producer

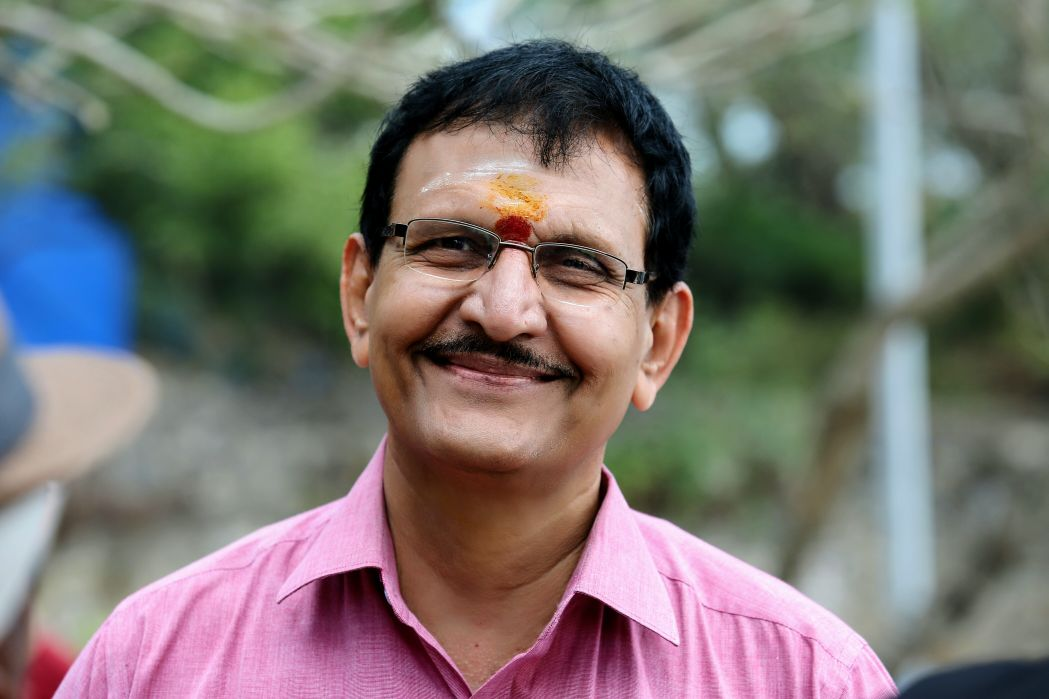
- Occupations: Film producer, distributor
- Children: 2
- Website: Sridevi Movies Youtube

Sivalenka Krishna Prasad is an Indian film producer.

== Early life ==
Sivalenka Krishna Prasad is the nephew of Chandra Mohan. He did his graduate studies from Osmania University in Hyderabad.

== Career ==
He started his career dubbing the film “Rakasi Nagu” from Kannada (JIDDI) into Telugu. He produced films under Sridevi Movies, Vaishnavi Cinema, and Sridevi Media Entertainments banners.

He is a producer and distributor, having experience in the field for more than 35 years and is associated with more than 35 feature films. His recent ventures are Sammohanam, featuring Sudheer Babu and Aditi Rao Hydari, and Yashoda starring Samantha Ruth Prabhu.

He is a life member in the Andhra Pradesh Film Chamber of Commerce and the A.P. Film Producers' Council and has been for the last 30 years. He has also been a member of the South Indian Film Chamber of Commerce and the Tamil Film Producers' Council since 2006.

== Filmography ==
As a producer

Year	Film	Director
1988	Chinnodu Peddodu	Relangi Narasimha Rao
1991	Aditya 369	Singeetam Srinivas Rao
1996	Vamsanikokkadu	Sarath
1998	Ooyala	S. V. Krishna Reddy
1999	Anaganaga Oka Ammayi	Ramesh Sarangan
2001	Bhalevadivi Basu	P. A. Arun Prasad
2009	Mitrudu	Mahadev
2016	Nani Gentleman	Mohana Krishna Indraganti
2018	Sammohanam	Mohana Krishna Indraganti
2022	Yashoda	Hari and Harish
2025	Sarangapani Jathakam	Mohana Krishna Indraganti

As an associate producer

Year	Film	Director	Notes
1994	Gunaa (Telugu Version )	Santhana Bharathi	
1995	Subha Sankalpam	K. Viswanath	
1996	Hello Brother (Tamil version)	E. V. V. Satyanarayana	
1997	Bhamane Satyabhamane (Telugu Version of Avvai Shanmughi)	K. S. Ravikumar	
2000	Thenali	K. S. Ravikumar	
2005	Mazhai	Raj kumar	
2018	Bluff Master (2018 film)	Gopi Ganesh	
2020	Entha Manchivaadavuraa	Satish Vegesna	

As a line producer

Year	Film	Director	Notes
2003	Unnai Charanadaindhen	-	
2006	Chennai 600028	Background score: Premji Amaren Original songs:Yuvan Shankar Raja, Premji Amaren (1 Song)	
2009	Kunguma Poovum Konjum Puravum	-	

As a distributor

- Rakasi Nagu
- Tulasi Dalam
- Rakshakudu
- Police Story : First Strike
- Mr. Nice Guy (1997 film)
- Who Am I?
- The Accidental Spy

As a Serial Producer In 2012, he established Sridevi Media Entertainments banner. Under this banner he produced a TV serial Muthyamanta Pasupu in Telugu, telecast on ETV Network TV channel and successfully completed 250 episodes.
