= Ambuli =

2012 Indian film by Hari Shankar and Hareesh Narayan

- Ambuli 25th day movie poster
- Directed by: K. Hari Shankar; Hareesh Narayan
- Written by: Haresh Narayan; K. Hari Shankar
- Produced by: KTVR Loganaathan
- Starring: R. Parthiban; Gokulnath; Jagan; P. S. Srijith; R. Ajay; Sanam Shetty; Jothisha
- Cinematography: Sathish G.
- Edited by: Hari Shankar
- Music by: Score: K. Venkat Prabhu Shankar; Songs: K. Venkat Prabhu Shankar; Sam C. S. Sathish Kumar; Mervin Solomon
- Production company: KTVR Creative Reels
- Release date: 17 February 2012
- Running time: 139 mins
- Country: India
- Language: Tamil

Ambuli (transl. Moon) is a 2012 Indian Tamil language stereoscopic period science fiction horror 3D film written and directed by Hari Shankar and Hareesh Narayan, who earlier directed Orr Eravuu in 2010. The film is the first stereoscopic film to be directed. Produced by KTVR Loganathan, the film features an ensemble cast of R. Parthiban, Gokulnath, Jagan, P. S. Srijith, R. Ajay, Sanam Shetty, and Jothisha. The film released on 17 February 2012, where it ran for over 100 days and became a box office success.

== Plot ==
The film begins in the cornfields within a village in Tamil Nadu, where a British forest ranger who is in charge of the fields has been alerted by some strange noises coming from inside the fields. He sets out with his dog and searches for the source of this noise. Suddenly, the dog is dragged inside and brutally killed by an unknown beastly creature called Ambuli. Then, the ranger is also dragged inside and killed.

Then the film shifts to 1978, when a college farewell party is going on at Arthur Wellington College. Two college friends, Amudhan and Vendhan, have decided to stay back in the college hostel and spend the vacation there. Amudhan's girlfriend Poongavanam lives in the nearby village of Poomanandhipuram, which is currently almost abandoned.

One night, Amudhan decides to go through the cornfield to Poomanandhipuram to meet with Poongavanam. While he returns, he hears the same strange noise and is chased and thrown off his cycle by Ambuli. Amudhan runs to the college, where he meets Vendhan, tells him what happened, and reveals to him that Ambuli is real. They both decide to visit the cornfield together that night to see what is happening. They both travel the entire field and find a wooden cabin, where the ranger once lived, and they meet a mysterious man named Sengodan (revealed to be Ambuli's brother) there. Sengodan guards the fields, but his looks cause suspicion to Amudhan and Vendhan that he might be Ambuli, and they escape from the cabin.

The next day, Amudhan asks Vendhan's father Vethagiri about Ambuli and Sengodan. Vethagiri is angered by the news that they both travelled alone in the cornfields and tells them that Ambuli lives there. It has killed so many people that Vethagiri become an alcoholic to get rid of his fear of Ambuli. He recounts the origin of Ambuli. About 40 years ago, on the day of the solar eclipse, a pregnant woman named Ponni, who has no one except her first son, walks into the village of Poomanandhipuram but faints right under the sun, which it was believed that one who comes out on a solar eclipse will be badly affected by the radiation, and she gave birth to her second child that very night. However, the baby that was born was not exactly a human: it was half-human and half-beast. The villagers then locked both Ponni and Ambuli in the house. Ponni, who was given a choice to destroy Ambuli, decides to let him go, while committing suicide, Ambuli escapes into the fields, and to date, it has been killing humans. Vethagiri also reveals that Sengodan is a murderer.

Vendhan and Amudhan decide to collect more details about Ambuli. Subsequently, they visit many people in the village and enquire about the creature. During that time, they found a collection of research films and journal entries documented by a gentleman named Sir Arthur Wellington. Vendhan and Amudhan learn that Wellington was not only the founder of his self-named college in the southern parts of India but also a scientist who worked with the British army during World War II. After his retirement, he found the Arthur Wellington College and began his own research in South India.

The also discovered that Wellington’s longtime goal was to successfully carry out and finish his project, the creation of a race of genetically-modified humans who can healthily live for 150 years. He decided to use Ponni as his test subject and inject Neanderthal DNA that he has collected back in his home country into her womb. The Neanderthal DNA had a detrimental impact on Ambuli. Wellington dopes her with strong sedatives so that she would him often for checkups and he can carry out his experiment tests without any problems. As she reached her due date, she was too much affected by the sedatives and started heading to Wellington's laboratory to get herself checked. That day turned out to be the solar eclipse, and unfortunately, she became affected by the radiation from the eclipse. This caused genetic mutations in the foetus leading to a condition called Xeroderma pigmentosa, making Ambuli highly susceptible to the UV rays in Sunlight. All these causes dangerous changes in her womb, and thus, Ambuli was born as a beast. Seemati, who checked her pregnancy, was terrified by Ambuli's appearance and behavior and told Ponni to kill Ambuli. But Ponni allowed Ambuli to escape and commit suicide out of humiliation. Angered by this, Sengodan killed Wellington, who was the reason for his sibling’s deformity and savagery, and experiments on his mother that led to her suicide.

Now having collected all details and the truth about Ambuli, the men decide that there is no use for anyone to hide from Ambuli, and they must fight against it. Poongavanam and Valarmalai decide to check on Amudhan and Vendhan that night, having been well aware of their investigation on Ambuli. Both the tuition master and landlord discovered their disappearances that night. The landlord accepts the plan, and the villagers decide to set out to hunt and destroy Ambuli for good.

Poongavanam gets trapped between thorn bushes in the cornfields, but is rescued by Sengodan, only for him to capture and gag her at the cabin. Amudhan and Vendhan arrive to find Sengodan, only to find Poongavanam there, tied up and gagged. Amudhan and Vendhan then reveal Ambuli's location to Poongavanam, only for Sengodan to overhear their conversation and offer to go along with them. While setting out to meet Ambuli, Valarmalai attempts to attack Sengodan upon thinking he got Amudhan, Vendhan, and Poongavanam captives, only to stop by them and ended up joining them. They visit the caves at night where they find an ape-like creature, which is finally shown and revealed to be Ambuli. As Ambuli tries to attack the group, Sengodan fights it bravely. Suddenly, the army and police arrive there with tranquilizers, having been alerted by the head police officer, who is convinced by Amudhan and Vendhan that Ambuli does exist. After an intense battle in the field between the army, the police, and Ambuli, Ambuli is tranquilized with Sengodan's help. The army captures Ambuli, and he is taken away in a secured box. Sengodan is heavily injured by Ambuli but manages to survive. He reveals that he wanted to kill and destroy Ambuli right after killing Wellington but was arrested, only to be released years later. When asked by Amudhan and Vendhan on why he killed Gugan and kidnapped Poongavanam, Sengodan revealed that he had mistaken Gugan as Ambuli and he was also trying to save Poongavanam from Ambuli. The villagers finally thank Sengodan, Marudhan, Amudhan, and Vendhan for their heroics in capturing Ambuli and thus ending their longtime fear.

As the credits roll out, a final shot is shown which is to happen in Dehradun, where the box in which Ambuli is being carried. The box slowly starts moving a little and cracks suddenly. It is to be understood that Ambuli escapes from the box and sets on his next hunt. The film ends with the line "Ambuli's hunt will continue".

== Cast ==
- R. Parthiban as Sengodan
- Gokulnath as Ambuli
- Jagan as Marudhan
- P. S. Srijith as Vendhan
- R. Ajay as Amudhan
- Sanam Shetty as Poongavanam (Voice dubbed by Krithika Nelson)
- K.P. Jagan as Poogeswaran
- Jothisha as Valarmathi
- Thambi Ramaiah as Vethagiri
- Rajendran as Gugan
- Uma Riyaz Khan as Ponni
- Kalairani as Seemati
- Bobby Hanspal as Sir Arthur Wellington
- Krishna Sekhar as Varugunapandian
- Ashokan as Kumaraguruparan
- Bosskey as Velpari
- Bala Singh as Dubashi
- Karate Raja as Inspector Jagannathan
- Theni Murugan as Vaithiyar

== Production ==
Hari Shankar and Hareesh Narayan, who made their directorial debut with the horror film Orr Eravuu (2010), decided to shoot a mystery thriller based on folklore and superstition. In an interview, they stated: "We have taken inspirations from folklore and Ambuli tells the story of a village which is soaked in superstitions. Ambuli means ‘moon’ and it is a moon light mystery". The film was promoted as being the "first ever-stereoscopic 3D film in Tamil cinema". The directors further disclosed that the plot revolved around "four youngsters who go in search of a story, the problems they face and how they overcome them", while clarifying that there was no villain in the film. Newcomers R. Ajai, P. S. Srijith, Sanam and Jothisha Ammu were signed on to enact the lead roles, while Gokulnath, best known from the reality-based dance competition Maanada Mayilada, was selected to play the titular character. The filming began on 4 February 2011.

== Soundtrack ==
Orr Eravuu

Soundtrack album by K. Venkat Prabu Shankar, Sam C. S., Ambuli Adil (child artist), Sathish Kumar, and Mervin Solomon
- Released: 2010
- Genre: Soundtrack
- Length: 36:17
- Language: Tamil

K. Venkat Prabu Shankar chronology
Orr Eravuu (2010)	Orr Eravuu (2010)	Aaaah (2014)

Sam C. S. chronology
Orr Eravuu (2010)	Ambuli (2012)	Aaaah (2014)

Sathish Kumar chronology
Orr Eravuu (2010)	Ambuli (2012)

Mervin Solomon chronology
Ambuli (2012)	Vadacurry (2014)

The soundtrack features eight tracks composed by four music directors, K. Venkat Prabu Shankar, Sam C.S., Sathish Kumar, and Mervin Solomon. The album was released at the Kamarajar Stadium on 19 August 2011. A 3D trailer of the film was also showcased at the event.

Track listing
No.	Title	Lyrics	Music	Singer(s)	Length
1.	"Happy Farewell Day"	Na. Muthukumar, Pop Shalini	Mervin Solomon	Benny Dayal, Pop Shalini, Reshmitha, Priyanka	5:33
2.	"Nenjukulla Yaaru"	Thamarai	Sam C. S.	Karthik, Chinmayi	5:47
3.	"Mazhaikaadey Manalmedey"	Nellai Jeyantha	K. Venkat Prabu Shankar	Madhu Balakrishnan	5:49
4.	"Chandirana Sooriyana"	Na. Muthukumar	Sathish Kumar	Vijay Prakash	4:43
5.	"Rock 'N' Roll"	Na. Muthukumar	Sam C. S.	Ranjith, Pop Shalini	5:05
6.	"Aatha Nee Pethaaye"	Nellai Jeyantha	K. Venkat Prabu Shankar	Thanjai Selvi	2:40
7.	"Ambuli Theme"		K. Venkat Prabu Shankar		3:06
8.	"3D Era"		Sathish Kumar	Naresh Iyer, Blaaze	3:34

== Release ==
Ambuli was released on 17 February 2012 in both polarised and anaglyph 3D formats. In the first week, the film was screened in 100 theatres with polarized format in most of the theatres in Chennai and in anaglyph format outside of Chennai in many theatres not having the facility of polarized 3D which required silver-coated screen and two projectors supposed to be expensive at that time. In the third week, seven theatres from Madurai, Coimbatore, and Trichy agreed and equipped their screens with polarized 3D based on the enormous response from the audience for the film.

== Reception ==
The Times of India rated the movie 3.5/5 stars and wrote, "With the directors giving enough indications of a planned sequel, "Ambuli" could well become India’s first horror franchise."
