= Bhalevadivi Basu =

2001 film by P.A. Arun Prasad

- DVD cover
- Directed by: P. A. Arun Prasad
- Screenplay by: P. A. Arun Prasad
- Story by: P. A. Arun Prasad
- Dialogue by: Ramesh-Gopi
- Produced by: Sivalenka Krishna Prasad
- Starring: Nandamuri Balakrishna; Anjala Zhaveri; Shilpa Shetty
- Cinematography: Jayanan Vincent
- Edited by: Nandamuri Hari
- Music by: Mani Sharma
- Production company: Sridevi Movies
- Release date: 15 June 2001
- Running time: 156 minutes
- Country: India
- Language: Telugu

Bhalevadivi Basu is a 2001 Indian Telugu-language action comedy film directed by P. A. Arun Prasad. It stars Nandamuri Balakrishna, Anjala Zhaveri, and Shilpa Shetty, with music composed by Mani Sharma. The film was produced by Sivalenka Krishna Prasad under the Sridevi Movies banner. Bhalevadivi Basu generated significant anticipation as it followed the tremendous success of Narasimha Naidu and was intended to transform Nandamuri Balakrishna's image from an action hero to a family hero. However, the film was not commercially successful.

== Plot ==
At Hyderabad Airport, customs officers catch foreigners who are involved in wildlife smuggling, who are shot by officer Banerjee as they attempt to escape. At the hospital, the captured criminals confess to the crime and reveal the name of their leader as officer Banerjee, but are caught off guard when Shobha, sent by Banerjee, triggers an explosion, where everyone are killed. To address the issue of poaching, the Government of India appoints a new forest ranger, Sagar, to the Sileru forest. Sagar quickly takes charge by capturing traffickers and establishing a strong rapport with his subordinates and the local tribal community, with his driver Balu. A tribal girl named Nemali becomes infatuated with him.

Soon after, Swetha, a senior officer to Sagar, arrives, and she also falls in love with him, leading to a romance between the two. Amid a few comedic scenes, an enigmatic woman named Kavitha appears, claiming to be a social worker but arousing suspicion of being a spy. Meanwhile, Banerjee orchestrates a large-scale poaching operation, which Sagar and Swetha successfully intercept. The government rewards Sagar for his achievements, and he dedicates the honour by building a hospital.

During the hospital's inauguration, Kavitha accuses Sagar of being an impostor by revealing a photograph of the real Sagar. Shocked, Sagar admits the truth and reveals that his real identity is Prabhu. Additionally, Kavitha discloses that she is Sunitha, Sagar's sister, leading to a series of unexpected revelations from their past.

Prabhu and Jaggu are seasoned thieves who often act as mock witnesses in court. One day, a corrupt officer, CI Bhushan, hires them to frame an innocent man, but they refuse, leading to Bhushan’s suspension and his vow for revenge. Later, Prabhu encounters Sagar and, after reading a letter, learns his story. Sagar reveals that, from childhood, he has been deeply committed to education, a passion his mother, Lalithamma, worked tirelessly to support alongside his sister, Sunitha. Currently awaiting his official appointment to the Indian Forest Service (IFS), Sagar has been sending his hard-earned income home to help his family.

Moved by Sagar’s story, Prabhu reveals his true identity, but Sagar respects him nonetheless, and a close friendship develops between them. Prabhu begins to see Sagar as a brother, especially after learning that Lalithamma is seriously ill and requires surgery. He vows to help save her and urges Sagar to continue his journey. However, CI Bhushan exploits the situation and frames Prabhu and Jaggu for murder, forcing them to flee. They eventually reach the forest, where they witness a tragic accident in which Sagar is gravely injured and dies. Determined to keep Sagar’s dream alive for the sake of his mother and sister, Prabhu assumes Sagar’s identity.

When Sunitha learns of Prabhu’s sacrifice, she recognises his noble character. Lalithamma arranges a marriage for Sunitha, and Prabhu conceals Sagar’s death to ensure her happiness, even performing the marriage rituals. Despite knowing the truth, Lalithamma accepts Prabhu as her son. Soon after, Prabhu captures a tribal man named Anji, who turns out to be Banerjee’s agent. Anji reveals their illegal operations, and Prabhu uncovers that Banerjee was behind Sagar’s assassination.

In the end, Banerjee attempts to destroy the forest, but Prabhu foils his plans, defeats the villains, and clears his name. The movie concludes on a happy note, with Prabhu uniting with the family and fulfilling Sagar’s legacy.

== Cast ==
- Nandamuri Balakrishna as Prabhu, a thief who is Sagar's friend
- Shilpa Shetty as Swetha
- Anjala Zaveri as Nemali
- Venkat as Sagar
- Prakash Raj as Benerjee
- Brahmanandam as Cook Bhima Rao
- Sumitra as Lalithamma, Sagar's mother)
- Sudhakar as Balu / Jaggu
- Mallikarjuna Rao as Ammi Raju
- Bhupinder Singh as Anji
- M. Balayya as Judge
- Raghunatha Reddy as Judge
- Sivaji Raja as Kamal
- Kallu Chidambaram as Manmadha Rao
- Gundu Hanumantha Rao
- Gautam Raju
- Satya Prakash as C. I. Bhushan
- Juttu Narasimham as Kodi Rammurthy
- Swathi as Sunitha
- Vichithra as Pushpa
- Indu Anand

== Soundtrack ==
The music was composed by Mani Sharma and released by Supreme Music Company.

No.	Title	Lyrics	Singer(s)	Length
1.	"Yahi Hai Right Choice"	Kulashekar	Shankar Mahadevan	4:38
2.	"Ammammo Brahma"	Bhuvanachandra	Shankar Mahadevan, Gopika Poornima	4:19
3.	"Ayyare Ayyare"	Sirivennela Sitarama Sastry	Sudhala Dhanaveer, Chitra	5:06
4.	"Rayyi Rayyi Mandi"	Bhuvanachandra	Udit Narayan, Swarnalatha	4:18
5.	"Kukuku Ante"	Bhuvanachandra	S. P. Balasubrahmanyam, Kavita Subramaniam	4:38
6.	"Bava Bava"	Vennelakanti	S. P. Balasubrahmanyam, Chitra, Sujatha	5:37
Total length:				28:38

== Reception ==
Sify wrote, "Bhalevadivi Basu falls flat due to a weak script and absolutely no directorial sense. The major drawback is that the film has not been able to exploit Balakrishna’s image and the climax is too tame, as the plot peters out". Indiainfo wrote "The movie has two major flaws; the lack of solid dialogues and a strong villain. Prakash Raj as villain has nothing to offer and truly speaking, the talent of Prakash Raj has been wasted. The climax fights are also weak. This movie may prove to be great disappointment for Ballayya’s fans, as they love watching him fight like a lion and deliver strong dialogues. And in this movie you neither have solid fights nor dialogues".
