= Sridevi Movies =

Indian film production and distribution company

- Type: Private
- Industry: Entertainment
- Founded: Hyderabad, Telangana in 1987
- Headquarters: Hyderabad, Telangana, India
- Key people: Sivalenka Krishna Prasad
- Products: Films
- Owner: Sivalenka Krishna Prasad
- Website: Sridevi Movies Youtube

Sridevi Movies is an Indian film production and distribution company established in 1987 by Sivalenka Krishna Prasad, nephew of veteran Telugu film actor Chandra Mohan (Telugu actor). The company is based in Hyderabad and has produced films in Telugu and Tamil languages. The production house is known for projects like Aditya 369 which was one of India's first science-fiction movies starring Nandamuri Balakrishna released in the year 1991 under the direction of filmmaker Singeetam Srinivasa Rao.

== Film production ==
The production house's latest released film was Sammohanam with Sudheer Babu as the lead actor and Aditi Rao Hydari in the female Lead role under the direction of Mohana Krishna Indraganti.

Sridevi Movies is known for its blockbusters, its beginning marked by the filming of the movie Chinnodu Peddodu in 1988. The company delivered several successful projects, including Aditya 369, Vamsanikokkadu starring Nandamuri BalaKrishna, and Ooyala starring Srikanth & Ramya Krishnan. This production house latest Release film was Gentleman with Nani as lead hero and Surbhi as the opposite lead under the direction of Mohan Krishna Indraganti.

=== Production ===
Year	Title	Director	Notes
1988	Chinnodu Peddodu	Relangi Narasimha Rao	
1991	Aditya 369	Singeetam Srinivas Rao	Got Nandi Award for the best costume Designer; Nandi Award for the Best Art Director
1996	Vamsanikokkadu	Sharath	
1998	Ooyala	S V Krishna Reddy	
1999	Anaganaga Oka Ammayi	Ramesh Sarangan	
2000	VIP	Sabapathy Dekshinamurthy	Tamil Dubbed Movie of VIP
2001	Bhalevadivi Basu	P. A. Arun Prasad	
2009	Mitrudu	Mahadev	
2016	Nani Gentleman	Mohan Krishna Indraganti	
2018	Sammohanam	Mohan Krishna Indraganti	
2018	Bluff Master	Gopi Ganesh	
2020	Entha Manchivaadavuraa	Satish Vegesna	
2022	Yashoda	Hari and Harish	
2025	Sarangapani Jathakam	Mohana Krishna Indraganti	

=== As an associate production ===
Year	Title	Director
1994	Gunaa (Telugu version)	Santhana Bharathi
1995	Subha Sankalpam	K. Viswanath
1996	Hello Brother (Tamil version)	E. V. V. Satyanarayana
1997	Bhamane Sathyabhamane (Telugu Version of Avvai Shanmugi)	K. S. Ravikumar
2000	Thenali	K. S. Ravikumar
2005	Mazhai	Raj Kumar
