= Gentleman (2016 film) =

2016 film by Mohan Krishna Indraganti

- Theatrical release poster
- Directed by: Mohan Krishna Indraganti
- Written by: R. David Nathan; Mohan Krishna Indraganti
- Produced by: Sivalenka Krishna Prasad
- Starring: Nani; Nivetha Thomas; Surbhi; Tanikella Bharani; Srinivas Avasarala; Vennela Kishore
- Cinematography: P. G. Vinda
- Edited by: Marthand K. Venkatesh
- Music by: Mani Sharma
- Production company: Sridevi Movies
- Distributed by: Gaatri Media (Overseas)
- Release date: 17 June 2016
- Running time: 145 minutes
- Country: India
- Language: Telugu
- Budget: ₹15 crore
- Box office: est. ₹32.6 crore

Nani Gentleman (or simply Gentleman) is a 2016 Indian Telugu-language romantic thriller film directed by Mohan Krishna Indraganti who wrote the film with R. David Nathan. Produced by Sivalenka Krishna Prasad's Sridevi Movies, Gentleman stars Nani in double role alongside Nivetha Thomas, Surbhi, Tanikella Bharani, Srinivas Avasarala and Vennela Kishore. The film narrates the story of two women, Aishwarya and Catherine, whose respective lovers, Jayaram and Gautham, are lookalikes. When Gautham dies in an accident, Catherine suspects Jai's role in it and spies on him, which reveals further truths about Jai and the people around him, including Gautham.

The film marked Prasad's return to film production after an eight-year hiatus. P. G. Vinda was the film's director of photography. Mani Sharma composed the soundtrack and score; Marthand K. Venkatesh edited the film. Principal photography commenced in November 2015 and lasted until April 2016. Except for a schedule in Kodaikanal, the majority of the film's portions were shot in and around Hyderabad.

Produced on a budget of ₹15 crore, Gentleman was released on 17 June 2016 in 700 screens globally. It was also the third biggest South Indian film released in the United States to that point in terms of screen-count. Post-release, the film received positive reviews from critics and audience, where it become a commercial success at the box office, grossing a total of ₹32.6 crore globally, with a distributor share of ₹16.3 crore. Nivetha Thomas won SIIMA Award for Best Female Debut (Telugu) at 6th South Indian International Movie Awards for her role in the film. The film was remade in Bengali as Villain in 2018 and in Odia as Blackmail in 2018.

== Plot ==
Aishwarya, the daughter of an affluent entrepreneur, boards a flight back to Hyderabad from the United States. Catherine, a VFX designer returning from a month-long workshop, boards the same flight in London. To help pass the time, they share their love stories. Catherine explains that she is in a relationship with Gautham, a graduate from IIM who owns an adventure club, and Aishwarya shares that her fiancé Jayaram "Jai" Mullapudi is an award-winning entrepreneur who oversees his father's company Jai Gowri Finance. When Aishwarya and Catherine arrive in Hyderabad, they are met by Jai and the former's cousin Vamsi. Catherine gets shocked to see that Jai is Gautham's lookalike.

After hearing from Gautham's mother Yashoda about his death in an accident ten days earlier, she leaves the house grief-stricken. An investigative journalist named Nithya meets her and tells her that she suspects that Gautham was murdered. They initially suspect David, Catherine's uncle, who is admitted to a hospital after an overdose of narcotics. Catherine reaches the hospital only to learn that Jai has kidnapped the comatose David. Nithya uncovers information about a potential accounting scandal in Jai Gowri Finance and knows that the suicide of Jai's uncle Mohan and Gautham's accident took place on the same day. Catherine and Nithya agree on spying on Jai. Aishwarya recommends Catherine to Jai for a job in the latter's company, to which he reluctantly agrees.

Catherine's presence in the company disturbs Jai, who soon realizes that she is spying on him. Nevertheless, he remains silent. Catherine overhears a conversation between Vamsi and Jai where the former threatens to disclose the latter's involvement in Gautham's murder to the media. Catherine then becomes the victim of an attempted murder, almost getting run over by a lorry while on the road. She later gains information about the security arrangements of the company by coercing her team leader Sudarshanam. Nithya provides a duplicate of the master key to Jai's cabin. Catherine finds the discharge papers of David and Gautham and a document confirming the transfer of ₹5 billion from Aishwarya's company.

Catherine and Nithya later visit an orphanage where David is being treated and find him dead. They spot Jai leaving the orphanage in a hurry, which strengthens their suspicions. At a party, Jai is disturbed after observing a growing intimacy between Catherine and Vamsi, an intimacy created by Catherine to provoke Jai. After mustering courage, Jai tells Vamsi that he will divulge the truth to the police. Vamsi rushes to fetch the documents with which he has been blackmailing Jai. Jai reaches the place and a fight ensues. Jai kills Vamsi and manages to make it look like a road accident. Jai then destroys all the documents Vamsi had been using to blackmail him. The following day, Aishwarya finds Jai's clothes and photograph in Catherine's closet and suspects an illicit relationship between them. After a dejected Aishwarya calls off the marriage and leaves, Catherine confronts Jai and challenges him to unveil his real self as a murderer and fraudster.

Initially stoic, an emotional Jai reveals that he is Gautham himself by showing a wristband Catherine had given him before leaving for London. The couple reconciles and Gautham starts narrating the truth. Vamsi, who is jealous of Jai's success, persuades David, his old friend, to murder him. Assuming he is Gautham, David agrees, due to a fight he had with Gautham earlier. Meanwhile, Gautham comes across Jai's photograph on the Internet and alters his look to resemble Jai, and meets Mohan in an attempt to find sponsors for his club. A dying Mohan reveals that Vamsi coerced him to invest in betting and illegal businesses, which resulted in a loss of nearly ₹5 billion, for which Aishwarya's father Ram Prakash agreed to reimburse him.

Meanwhile, David fatally stabs Jai in a warehouse, which is secretly filmed by Vamsi. Before Jai dies, Gautham reaches the spot and promises Jai to save his company from Vamsi and others. Gautham then places his clothes and wallet along with Jai's body in his car and pushes it into a lake, making it look like an accident. Yashoda helps him with this cover-up, and Gautham begins his new life as Jai. However, Vamsi, who knows Gautham's true identity and filmed all the events, edits the visuals and blackmails Gautham. With Catherine spying on him, Gautham had no option but to remain silent to avoid issues with Vamsi. Gautham also reveals that Vamsi is the one who attempted to murder Catherine with the lorry. Aishwarya emerges, having overheard the entire conversation, and the families mourn Jai's death. A year later, the families of Jai and Aishwarya attend an award ceremony where Aishwarya is adjudged the best entrepreneur of the year. She dedicates the award to the deceased Jai, as Gautham and Catherine watch teary-eyed.

== Cast ==
- Nani in dual roles as Gautham and Jayaram Mullapudi "Jai"
- Nivetha Thomas as Catherine "Cathy", Gautham's love interest
- Surbhi as Aishwarya "Aishu", Jayaram's love interest
- Tanikella Bharani as Mohan, Jayaram's uncle
- Srinivas Avasarala as Vamsi
- Vennela Kishore as Sudarshanam
- Vinay Varma as David, Catherine's uncle
- Sreemukhi as Nithya
- Anand as Ram Prakash, Aishwarya's father
- Pragathi as Jayaram's mother
- Rohini as Yashoda, Gautham's mother
- Satyam Rajesh as Catherine's colleague
- Rama Prabha as Aishwarya's grandmother

== Production ==
=== Development ===
After the release of Bandipotu (2015), filmmaker Mohan Krishna Indraganti began working on two scripts; one of those reached completion in March 2015. Indraganti stated that he had long been keen on making a film based on that concept, adding that it would be a completely new genre for him. Sivalenka Krishna Prasad agreed to bankroll the film, marking his comeback to film production after a sabbatical of eight years. Prasad urged Indraganti to listen to a script written by Tamil writer R. David Nathan. Indraganti found Nathan's script too alien for the Telugu-speaking audience and tweaked it to suit the regional sensibilities. He later revealed that the film would be a romantic thriller and dedicated its second half to filmmaker Alfred Hitchcock as a tribute.

R. David Nathan was credited with providing the story and scenario, while Indraganti penned the screenplay and the dialogue besides co-writing the script. P. G. Vinda was the film's director of photography. Mani Sharma composed the film's soundtrack and score. Marthand K. Venkatesh edited the film. As the protagonist is suspected to be a villain but actually is a gentleman, Indraganti wanted to name the film by choosing the Telugu equivalent of the word gentleman. After considering titles such as Uttamudu and Manchivadu, he chose Gentleman, with the tagline "Hero? Villain?". The title was formally announced on 15 April 2016, on the eve of Sri Rama Navami.

=== Casting ===
"[Jai] is that mysterious guy in our friends circle. You never know how he reacts and that is what exactly I wanted to portray on screen. [...] on Gentleman sets I had to read the earlier day sequences and the next day sequences to get my present-day shot to perfection."

— Nani, on playing Jayaram "Jai" Mullapudi, in an interview with The Hans India in June 2016.

Indraganti signed his protégé Nani as the protagonist after being impressed with his performance as a selfish businessperson in Yevade Subramanyam (2015); it marked their second collaboration after Ashta Chamma (2008). In February 2016 Nani was reported to play a dual role in the film and Srinivas Avasarala's inclusion was confirmed. Indraganti described the latter's role as "something very complex", unlike the comic and supporting roles he has undertaken in the past. It was later revealed that Nani's character would feature a negative streak and that a pair of spectacles would be instrumental as a "key contrasting feature" for the dual role. Indraganti stated that the film "explores human frailties" and lacks a "conventional villain, one who is completely bad".

Surbhi and Nivetha Thomas were cast as the female leads in September 2015; Gentleman marks the latter's debut in Telugu cinema. Surbhi's name was suggested by Nani to Indraganti, who was impressed with her performance in Velaiilla Pattadhari (2014). Commenting on Aishwarya's characterisation, Surbhi stated that she would play a rich young entrepreneur who "has her values intact and takes life very seriously" besides being "generous and compassionate". Her costumes were a blend of ethnic and urban casuals. Nivetha called her role as Catherine an "independent, vulnerable and modern girl who is ready to take on any challenge head-on". Two romantic tracks were written for the leads; while one was cinematic, the other was more realistic. Nivetha learnt Telugu during the film's shoot and was encouraged by Nani and Indraganti to dub for her portions. She gave up the attempt to attend her architecture exams in Chennai. Vennela Kishore was cast as Sudarshanam, a comic role of a suspicious team leader. Sreemukhi played the role of Nithya, an investigative journalist, which was reported to be a key supporting role.

=== Filming ===
According to Indraganti, the costumes, production design, and cinematography were well-coordinated, resulting in the film being produced with an "interesting palette". Surbhi joined the film's sets in November 2015, and Nani was expected to begin filming for his portions after completing Krishna Gaadi Veera Prema Gaadha (2015). The film's cast and crew, including the director, underwent a thorough reading session to better understand the story and its characters before rehearsals. Filming was stalled in December 2015 due to the death of a crew member at the Sanghi Temple in Hayathnagar, Hyderabad. Surbhi and Nani completed filming of their portions in Gentleman while continuing to promote their respective films Express Raja (2016) and Krishna Gaadi Veera Prema Gaadha in Hyderabad.

The first schedule wrapped up in mid-February 2016. By then, 40% of the film's shoot had been completed. The next schedule commenced at Kodaikanal on 22 February 2016. Major scenes and songs were filmed during the schedule, which lasted until 6 March 2016. The last schedule began on 14 March 2016. Principal photography neared completion in early April 2016, and the remaining portions were filmed in Hyderabad. The post-production work commenced in late April 2016, after the completion of the film's shoot.

== Music ==
Mani Sharma composed the soundtrack and score of Gentleman, which consists of four songs. His inclusion into the film's technical crew was confirmed in late February 2016. Impressed with his work in Krishna Gaadi Veera Prema Gaadha, Nani recommended lyricist Krishna Kanth to Sharma, who wrote the lyrics for two songs. Ramajogayya Sastry and Sirivennela Sitaramasastri each penned the lyrics for one song. The soundtrack, marketed by Aditya Music, was released on 31 May 2016 at a promotional event attended by the full cast and crew.

Reviewing the soundtrack, The Times of India gave a rating of four stars and stated that it "excels with various styles and genres, kicking mediocrity out of the window". The newspaper termed "Chali Gaali Chuudduu" a "real gem of a song", praising the lyrics and an interlude with trumpet solo that "comes as a breath of fresh air". Karthik Srinivasan, writing for The Hindu, found the second interlude of "Chali Gaali Chuudduu" a "beautifully melodic and extended" one similar to the works of Ilaiyaraaja. Srinivasan termed the song a "wonderfully mellow and jazzy" melody and praised the renditions by Haricharan and Padmalatha.

Gentleman

Soundtrack album by Mani Sharma
- Released: 31 May 2016
- Recorded: 2016
- Genre: Soundtrack
- Length: 20:17
- Label: Aditya Music
- Producer: Mani Sharma

Mani Sharma chronology
Lion (2015)	Gentleman (2016)	Siddhartha (2016)

Track-List
No.	Title	Lyrics	Singer(s)	Length
1.	"Chali Gaali Chuudduu"	Sirivennela Sitaramasastri	Haricharan, Padmalatha, Malvika Sriram	04:27
2.	"Gusa Gusa Lade"	Ramajogayya Sastry	Karthik, Pranavi	03:57
3.	"Dintaka Dintaka"	Krishna Kanth	Rahul, Uma Neha	03:44
4.	"Saturday Night Fever"	Krishna Kanth	Narendra, Manisha Eerabathini	04:11
5.	"Gusa Gusa Lade (Version 2)"	Ramajogayya Sastry	Sri Krishna, Sujatha Mohan	03:58
Total length:				20:17

== Release ==
Gentleman was released worldwide on 17 June 2016 in 700 screens, competing with other Telugu films such as Guppedantha Prema, Premikudu, and Rudra IPS. Gaatri Media released the film on 127 screens in the United States with special premieres, claiming it the biggest release for a film starring Nani up to that date. According to Indo-Asian News Service, Gentleman had the third biggest release for a South Indian film to that point after 24 and Theri. The release locations included a few smaller cities of the United States such as Tallahassee, Maryville, and Poughkeepsie. Besides the United States, Gentleman was released in other overseas markets such as Africa and Germany. The film was remade into Bengali as Villain (2018).

== Reception ==
=== Critical reception ===
Gentleman received positive reviews, with praise for the performances, Sharma's score, and the scripting. Mridula Ramadugu of Firstpost praised the performances of Nani and Niveda in particular and called Gentleman a very subtle thriller that "stands out from the typical, action drama". Purnima Sriram of The New Indian Express termed the film a "game changer" in Nani's career, and one that can "penetrate minds with intelligent moves in every scene". Writing for The Hindu, Sangeetha Devi Dundoo gave three and a half stars out of five and called Gentleman an "intriguing tale marked by fine performances". Dundoo praised Nani's performance and found it "swiftly moving between being vulnerable and ominous". Suresh Kavirayani of the Deccan Chronicle also gave the film three and a half stars out of five, praising the performances of the principal cast and Sharma's score. He also praised Indraganti's screenplay and dialogues but criticised the climax and the love story of Nani and Surbhi.

Karthik Keramalu of News18 gave Gentleman three stars out of five and stated, "I wouldn't say this is the most experimental film [Nani] has worked on; I would say this is an excellent film he has chosen to work on within the limited space of [the] commercial cinema." Sify also gave the film a rating of three stars and called it a "neat thriller" that "doesn't move to the next level after promising best in the interval period". In contrast, L. Ravichander of The Hans India rated the film two stars out of five and criticised the performances of the principal cast except that of Nani for lacking authenticity, adding that the actor "fights a lone battle to bring credibility".

=== Box office ===
Gentleman debuted with earnings of US$71,938 (₹48.25 lakh) from its premiere shows, surpassing the records set by Nani's previous films. The opening global gross and distributor share figures stood at ₹5.5 crore and ₹3.19 crore, respectively, making it Nani's career best opener. In its first weekend, Gentleman grossed nearly ₹14 crore and collected a distributor share of approximately ₹9 crore globally. At the same time, it managed to earn US$537,490 (₹3.63 crore) at the United States box office. The film continued to earn steady returns due to positive word of mouth; it collected a total of US$678,032 (₹4.6 crore) in eight days, and US$771,107 (₹5.25 crore) in ten days at the United States box office. It also experienced a decent theatrical run at the AP/Nizam box office, where it grossed ₹15.4 crore in ten days, with a distributor share of ₹10.21 crore.

In its third week, the film witnessed a drop of 60% in its screen count and 65% in its revenues. According to trade analyst Taran Adarsh, it collected a total of US$872,320 (₹5.86 crore) in 17 days at the United States box office. The film's global earnings remained steady despite reduction in screen count due to new releases. In 17 days, Gentleman grossed a total of ₹28.21 crore globally with a distributor share of ₹16.23 crore. The film managed to retain nine screens in the United States after the release of Sultan and witnessed a drop of 80% in its earnings; it collected a total of US$897,001 (₹6.03 crore) in 24 days. By the end of its theatrical run, Gentleman grossed a total of ₹32.6 crore globally, with a distributor share of ₹17.72 crore.
