= Orr Eravuu =

- Directed by: Hari Shankar; Hareesh Narayan; Krishna Sekhar
- Written by: Hari Shankar; Hareesh Narayan; Krishna Sekhar
- Produced by: Hari Shankar
- Starring: Sathish. G Vani Bhojan
- Cinematography: Sathish. G
- Edited by: Hari Shankar
- Music by: Score: K. Venkat Prabu Shankar; Songs: Sam C. S. Sathish Kumar
- Production company: Shankar Bros.
- Release date: 11 June 2010
- Country: India
- Language: Tamil

Orr Eravuu (English: One night) is a 2010 Tamil independent horror film written and directed by debutants Hari Shankar, Hareesh Narayan, and Krishna Sekhar. The film stars Sathish G and Vani Bhojan in the lead roles. The film released on 11 June 2010 to mixed reviews.

The film is about paranormal occurrences. Spirits and ghosts are believed to have a close kinship with the night. Based on this concept, Orr Eravuu was made. The entire film was shot from the protagonist's viewpoint, using shaky camerawork, reportedly the first Indian viewpoint film.

== Plot ==
Nakulan Ponnusamy, a paranormal investigator and proprietor of Silver Chord Services, travels from Chennai to Munnar where he goes to solve a case of a house believed to be haunted, belonging to businessman Anand Chandrasekar. Nakul spends one full night in the haunted house and conducts his sophisticated paranormal investigation. Meanwhile, he finds that three other investigators belonging to Seventh Sense Parapsychology team also had come to the house for investigation. After some horrible sequences and mysterious circumstances, Nakul is found dead in the house. Daisy, a reporter in a Television Program Metro Crimes, analyzes his death.

== Cast ==
- Sathish. G as Nakulan Ponnusamy
- Vani Bhojan as Daisy (credited as Hevanthika)
- Asha as Nithee
- Anand Chandrasekar as Anand Chandrasekar
- P. S. Srijith as Govardhan
- R. Ajay as Ajay
- Hari Shankar as Vishwa
- Hareesh Narayan as Harish
- Krishna Sekhar as Villivakkam Raman

== Production ==
Orr Eravuu was produced by one of the directors Hari Shankar under the banner Shankar Bros; it was the studio's first film project. The film was initially titled as Eraaa, before it was renamed.

== Music ==
The music was composed by K. Venkat Prabu Shankar and Sam C. S. The film features one song that was supposedly penned by the spirit of legendary poet Kannadasan, through a medium, C. M. Rathnasamy, who has vast experience in this field of spirit interaction for nearly 30 years. The song was composed and performed by Sathish Kumar. The song includes the narration of the classic Tamil play Harichandra in which the lead character lives as a grave digger, describing the practice of funeral according to the good or bad life of the dead.

Track listing
No.	Title	Music	Singer(s)	Length
1.	"Ucchi Malayil"	Sam C. S.	Sam C. S.
2.	"Kaadhala"	Sam C. S.	Sam C. S., Mancy
3.	"Naan Oru Netraya Nayagan"	Sathish Kumar	Benny Dayal

Orr Eravuu

Soundtrack album by K. Venkat Prabu Shankar, Sam C. S. and Sathish Kumar
- Released: 2010
- Genre: Soundtrack
- Length: 36:17
- Language: Tamil

K. Venkat Prabu Shankar chronology
Orr Eravuu (2010)	Ambuli (2012)

Sam C. S. chronology
Orr Eravuu (2010)	Ambuli (2012)

Sathish Kumar chronology
Orr Eravuu (2010)	Ambuli (2012)

== Reception ==
Orr Eravuu released to mixed critical response. Rediff's Pavithra Srinivasan gave the film 3 out of 5, citing that it was "definitely worth a watch". Malathai Rangaraja from The Hindu wrote, "The premise is interesting, the narration is new, the genre is fresh and the effort to be different is evident. Yet if the subject fails to keep the viewer glued to his seat, it's probably because the technical team is a let-down!" Bhama Devi Ravi from The Times of India gave the film 1.5 out of 5 and said: "...all the feverish excitement is lost when the film stays confined to the documentary feel [...] There are too many loopholes in the story [...] You come out feeling cheated of goosebumps".

== Awards ==
Orr Eravuu won the Best Tamil Independent Film Award at the 2010 Chennai International Film Festival.
