= Aaaah (film) =

2014 Indian film by Hari & Harish

- Poster
- Directed by: Hari Shankar; Harish Narayan
- Written by: Hari Shankar; Harish Narayan
- Produced by: V. Loganathan; V. Janarthanan; Srinivas Loganathan
- Starring: Gokulnath; Bobby Simha; Meghna; Bala Saravanan
- Cinematography: Sathish. G
- Edited by: Hari Shankar
- Music by: Songs: K. Venkat Prabhu Shankar; Score: Sam C. S. (unc.)
- Production companies: KTVR Creative Frames; Shankar Bros
- Release date: 28 November 2014
- Country: India
- Language: Tamil

Aaaah is a 2014 Indian Tamil-language anthology horror film written and directed by Hari & Harish. The film stars Gokulnath, Bobby Simha, Meghna and Bala Saravanan. It features five different horror stories shot in five different places; Japan, Dubai, the midsea of the Bay of Bengal, a highway in Andhra Pradesh and a remote ATM booth in Tamil Nadu. It was released on 28 November 2014 to mixed to positive reviews.

== Plot ==
Three friends, Thamizh, Cherry and Singaram, reunite and are challenged by their wealthy schoolmate Prosper to prove the existence of ghosts. The bet takes them to five locations suspected of being haunted: Japan, Dubai, the mid-sea of the Bay of Bengal, a highway in Andhra Pradesh and a remote ATM booth in Tamil Nadu. They fail to capture any ghosts on camera and fear losing the 60 crore prize to Prosper.

They subsequently learn of footage showing a ghost killing the security guard at the ATM. The video is stored on a pen drive owned by Bosskey, the proprietor of the security company that employed the guard. Upon learning of the substantial reward for footage proving the existence of ghosts, Bosskey demands 50 lakhs for the pen drive. Cherry approaches Prosper for the money, but he attempts to take advantage of her and behaves indecently. Upset, she returns home and recounts the incident to Thamizh and Singaram.

That night, Cherry receives a call from her lover, Salim, and, overcome with shock and fear, utters a single word: "accident". The three friends rush to the scene, where they find Salim dying. Before succumbing to his injuries, he recounts what happened and records the account on his camera.

Salim and his friends had been travelling by car when they watched a film from a CD purchased from a street vendor, who claimed it was an unreleased movie. As they watched, the events depicted in the film began happening to them in real life. All three were eventually killed, although Salim managed to bury the CD. The CD is later found, but before the friends can retrieve it, the ghost kills all three.

Having won the bet, Prosper reclaims his prize, a Yamaha RX 100, and celebrates his victory. However, when he hears the doorbell ring and opens the door, a ghost kills him.

== Cast ==
- Ambuli Gokulnath as Thamizh
- Bobby Simha as Prosper
- Meghna as Cherry
- Bala Saravanan as Singaram alias Sing
- P. S. Srijith as Ranga
- Ashokan as Prosper's uncle
- Lokesh R as Dr. Prakash
- Sriram as Dosa Master Mani
- Sathish as Beer Mohammed
- Priya as Priya
- Mydhili as Kareena
- Chandi as Kathrina
- Naani as Ramesh
- Sreeni as Suresh
- Palani as Mukesh
- Gaana Bala in a special appearance in the song "Kannaadithanda"
- Sandy in a special appearance in the song "Kannaadithanda"

Mandhikuzhi Marmam	Nishikasai Incident	Yesania	Night Shift	Valaivil Munthathey
Thalapathi as Aryan; Monisha as Roma; Ramesh T as Thooyan; Iqbal as Bharath; Priya as Sakshi	Gowri Shankar as Gowri; Takehiro Shiraga as Patient/Ghost	Femania Baker as Yesania; Ramesh Vishwanathan as A. T. Manikandan; Yamuna as Mrs. Manikandan; Ramani as Irfan; Nagaraj as Tajjudin; Senthil as Mohideen Kaaka; Ajai as Salim	M. S. Bhaskar as Guru; Bosskey as Security Company Owner; Dunston as Sagayam	Tamilarasan as Raghu; Murali as Murali; Zoo Zoo as Aravind; Aravind as Dilip; P. S. Srijith as Che
