= Vamsanikokkadu =

- Theatrical release poster
- Directed by: Sarath
- Screenplay by: Sarath
- Story by: Paruchuri Brothers
- Produced by: Sivalenka Krishna Prasad
- Starring: Nandamuri Balakrishna; Ramya Krishna; Aamani
- Cinematography: V. S. R. Swamy
- Edited by: Kotagiri Venkateswara Rao
- Music by: Koti
- Production company: Sridevi Movies
- Release date: 5 January 1996
- Running time: 138 minutes
- Country: India
- Language: Telugu

Vamsanikokkadu (transl. One Person for Dynasty) is a 1996 Telugu-language drama film directed by Sarath. It stars Nandamuri Balakrishna, Ramya Krishna, Aamani, and music composed by Koti. It was produced by Sivalenka Krishna Prasad under the Sridevi Movies banner. The film was a box office success.

== Cast ==
- Nandamuri Balakrishna as Raja
- Ramya Krishna as Radha Bai
- Aamani as Sirisha
- Satyanarayana as Chakrapani
- Kota Srinivasa Rao as Kotilingam
- Brahmanandam as Appaji
- Babu Mohan as Vinayakam
- Mallikarjuna Rao as Chidambaram
- Tanikella Bharani as Yadagiri
- Rakhee as Giri
- Chalapathi Rao as Manager
- Vijaya Rangaraju as Rowdy
- M. Balaiyah as Ranga Rao
- Raja Ravindra as Murali
- Sanjay Asrani as Bhaskar
- Sivaji Raja as Vishnu
- Kota Shankar Rao as Lawyer
- Bhemiswara Rao as Judge
- Jaya Bhaskar as Lawyer
- Narsingh Yadav as Narsingh
- Jayanthi as Lilavathi
- Annapurna as Lakshmi
- Aruna Sri as Nirmala
- Madhurima as Rukmini
- Jayalalita as Ammaji
- Kalpana Rai
- Y. Vijaya as Andallu

== Music ==
The music was composed by Koti. The soundtrack was released by the Supreme Music Company.

Telugu track listing
No.	Title	Lyrics	Singer(s)	Length
1.	"Saradaga Samayam"	Sirivennela Sitarama Sastry	S. P. Balasubrahmanyam	5:07
2.	"Dandalo Dandamandi"	Bhuvanachandra	S. P. Balasubrahmanyam, Chitra	5:12
3.	"Valachi Valachi Vaastayana"	Veturi	S. P. Balasubrahmanyam, Chitra	4:50
4.	"Abbadani Soku Thaluku"	Veturi	S. P. Balasubrahmanyam, Chitra	5:06
5.	"Priya Mahasaya"	Veturi	S. P. Balasubrahmanyam, Chitra	4:54
6.	"Oyabba Nee Valu Kallu"	Bhuvanachandra	S. P. Balasubrahmanyam, Chitra	4:43
Total length:				29:52

The movie was dubbed into Tamil as Naan Ungel Vettu Pillai

Tamil (dubbed) track listing
No.	Title	Singer(s)	Length
1.	"Ala Nengi Kaman Oruvu"	S. P. Balasubrahmanyam
2.	"Vandhanam Kudu Vandhe"	S. P. Balasubrahmanyam, K. S. Chitra
3.	"Pala Ula Kala Nila"	S. P. Balasubrahmanyam, S. P. Sailaja
4.	"Oh Yamma Nee Mohamullu"	S. P. Balasubrahmanyam, K. S. Chitra
5.	"Varadhu Varadhu"	S. P. Balasubrahmanyam, Sujatha Mohan
6.	"Yappa Kandi Thopu"	S. P. Balasubrahmanyam, K. S. Chitra
