= Mitrudu =

- Movie Poster
- Directed by: A. Mahadev
- Written by: M. Ratnam (dialogues)
- Screenplay by: A. Mahadev
- Story by: V. Vijayendra Prasad
- Produced by: Sivalenka Krishna Prasad
- Starring: Nandamuri Balakrishna; Priyamani
- Cinematography: B. Balamurugan
- Edited by: Kola Bhaskar
- Music by: Mani Sharma
- Production company: Sridevi Movies
- Release date: 1 May 2009
- Running time: 154 mins
- Country: India
- Language: Telugu

Mitrudu (transl. Friend) is a 2009 Indian Telugu-language comedy drama film produced by Sivalenka Krishna Prasad under Vaishavi Cinema banner, directed by Mahadev. Starring Nandamuri Balakrishna, Priyamani and music composed by Mani Sharma. This film was later dubbed into Hindi as Aaj Ka Hindustani and Bhojpuri as Phool Aur Kaante.

== Cast ==
- Nandamuri Balakrishna as Aditya
- Priyamani as Indu
- Deepak as Madhu
- Brahmanandam as JB Jan / Jana Bethedu Janardhan
- M. Balayya as Aditya's grandfather
- Pradeep Rawat
- Giri Babu
- Chandra Mohan
- Ahuti Prasad
- Chalapathi Rao
- Krishna Bhagawan
- Raghu Babu
- Srinivasa Reddy
- Surekha Vani
- Hema
- Dharmavarapu Subramanyam
- Rallapalli
- Ranganath
- Srilalitha as Takhali
- Kuchuri Rachana Moiurya
- Sandhya Jalak
- Giridhar
- Rama Chandra
- Vasu Inturi
- Sana
- Pragathi
- Rajitha
- Baby Annie as Adhitya's sister-in-law
- Madhavi

== Soundtrack ==
Mitrudu

Film score by Mani Sharma
- Released: 2 April 2009
- Recorded: 2009
- Genre: Soundtrack
- Length: 26:36
- Label: Lahari Music
- Producer: Mani Sharma

Mani Sharma chronology
Billa (2009)	Mitrudu (2009)	Ek Niranjan (2009)

Music composed by Mani Sharma. Music released on Lahari Music Company.

Track-List
No.	Title	Lyrics	Singer(s)	Length
1.	"Thellavarithey"	Vennelakanti	Rahul Nambiar, Hemachandra, Sravana Bhargavi	4:58
2.	"By Birthe"	Anantha Sriram	Shreya Ghoshal	4:00
3.	"Dont Touch Me"	Anantha Sriram	Ranjith, Chitra	4:43
4.	"Jhummandi Vallantha"	Oruganti	Karthik, Sujatha	3:59
5.	"Priyamani"	Veturi	S. P. Balasubrahmanyam, Saindhavi	4:24
6.	"Akasam Nunchi"	Vennelakanti	Vijay Yesudas, Kousalya	4:30
Total length:				26:36

== Release ==
The film met with negative reviews from critics.
