= Yashoda (film) =

2022 film by Hari Shankar and Hari Krishna

- Theatrical release poster
- Directed by: Hari–Harish
- Written by: Hari–Harish
- Produced by: Sivalenka Krishna Prasad
- Starring: Samantha; Unni Mukundan; Varalaxmi Sarathkumar
- Cinematography: M. Sukumar
- Edited by: Marthand K. Venkatesh
- Music by: Mani Sharma
- Production company: Sridevi Movies
- Distributed by: Sakthi Film Factory (Tamil Nadu)
- Release date: 11 November 2022
- Running time: 132 minutes
- Country: India
- Language: Telugu
- Budget: ₹30−40 crore
- Box office: est. ₹32−50 crore

Yashoda is a 2022 Indian Telugu-language medical action thriller film written and directed by Hari–Harish. It stars Samantha in the title role alongside Unni Mukundan, Varalaxmi Sarathkumar, Sampath Raj, Rao Ramesh, Shatru and Murali Sharma.

Principal photography commenced in December 2021 and ended in July 2022. The film's score was composed by Mani Sharma, while the cinematography and editing were handled by M. Sukumar and Marthand K. Venkatesh, respectively. The film was released on 11 November 2022. Yashoda received mixed reviews from critics and was a commercial success.

== Plot ==
Yashoda, who works at Zomato, becomes a surrogate mother, as she needs to fund her sister's surgery. She is taken to Eva, a state-of-the-art surrogacy center owned by Dr. Madhubala. Yashoda befriends some of the surrogate mothers and spends time with them. They all find out that they are poor and in need of money.

Meanwhile, the local police investigate the accident involving business tycoon Shiva Reddy and his girlfriend, Aarushi. They deduce that it was a pre-planned murder and appoint Vasudeva IPS to lead the investigation. Vasudeva learns that Aarushi was a model and checks her e-mails, mail, and text messages. He learns that Aarushi's friend advised her not to promote a specific cosmetic brand because it contains harmful chemicals unknown to scientists. Vasudeva and his team head to meet Aarushi's friend, but find that he was murdered two days ago. Vasudeva retrieves a cosmetic sample from his house and finds a connection with the death of Olivia, a deceased Hollywood actress, who was killed when she drank drugged juice. When he checks into the owner of the cosmetic brand, he finds that Central Minister Giridhar owns the patent.

After an attack by unknown men, Vasudeva learns that 122 models will be arriving in India in six months. He learns that one model, Elena, has already arrived. Vasudeva, along with his team and Police Commissioner Balram, follows her into a forest, but local tribals catch them. Yashoda becomes suspicious of Eva, as she finds that her friends, Kajal and Leela, went missing after suffering from labor pains and undergoing surgery. To her shock, she learns that Eva is not situated in the city, but was actually shown to the surrogate mothers using a live-projector. Yashoda later sneaks into Zone-2, where she fights with Jenny, a fellow surrogate, who is faking her pregnancy and is a member of the Eva faculty. She tries to kill Yashoda, but Yashoda kills her. Afterward, Yashoda finds many boxes containing dead children and surrogate mothers in the assets room, in which she finds Kajal and Leela's bodies and that of Leela's child.

Under Madhubala's command, Yashoda is caught by a security guard. When the guard tries to rape her, she kills him. She then tries to enter Madhubala's cabin using Dr. Gautham's badge to find out more about Eva, but Madhubala catches her. Madhubala reveals that she was suffering from a disease, which resulted in her losing her beauty and caused her to age, but Gautham helped her by developing a drug that cured her illness. However, the drug is only temporary, with its effects lasting only six months. Giridhar, who turns out to be Madhubala's husband, tells her to invent a new drug by funding her research. Cut to the present, Madhubala and Gautham hold a meeting with their investors while showing live footage of the meeting to Yashoda, who is held captive in a separate room. The duo reveals that the plasma in the fetus is the secret ingredient used for the invention of the drug, and they hire poor women to become surrogate mothers by paying them. After making them pregnant, inducing fake labor pains, and performing C-Section they remove the fetus, discreetly kill the woman, and retrieve the plasma.

They finally created the drug and sold it to rich women, mostly models, CEOs, and actresses. They also reveal that Olivia had died due to a drug–drug interaction. They had Aarushi and Shiva Reddy killed in the accident, as she learned that the cosmetic brand also contained the same drug, and threatened to leak it. In the forest, Vasudeva and his team learn that Balram is in cahoots with Madhubala and Gautham. Vasudeva and his team are brought to a den to be killed. At Eva, Yashoda finds that the facility is in a forest and escapes through the emergency exit, but Gautham knocks her out and brings her back. Gautham makes a video call to Balram, who is holding Vasudeva and his team at gunpoint. However, Gautham, in turn, is held at gunpoint by Yashoda. It is revealed that Yashoda is actually a skilled IPS trainee, undercover at Eva. Despite being the academy topper, she was forced to arrange a bribe to join the police force.

One day, Yashoda learns about her sister Brinda's disappearance and finds that she had become a surrogate mother to arrange the money for her and was taken to Eva. To find her, Yashoda became a surrogate mother and planned everything from the start. A fight ensues, where Yashoda defeats the goons and Gautham but gets hit in the stomach, resulting in the death of her unborn baby. Meanwhile, Vasudeva and his team defeat the tribals and kill Balram. Yashoda meets up with her fellow surrogates and asks about Brinda but finds no information about her.

Madhubala tries to escape in a helicopter, but Yashoda stops her. Madhubala reveals that she was also pregnant, but sacrificed her fetus by aborting it to improve and develop her beauty and research. The women get enraged upon learning about Madhubala's true face and her activities and push her off the cliff, killing her. Gautham tries to escape but gets caught by Vasudeva and his team. Yashoda finds Brinda, who is in labor pain. The women help Yashoda deliver Brinda's child. Afterward, Giridhar's involvement in the scandal is exposed, and he is arrested.

== Cast ==
- Samantha Ruth Prabhu as Yashoda
- Unni Mukundan as Dr. Gautham
- Varalaxmi Sarathkumar as Madhubala
- Rao Ramesh as Central Minister Giridhar
- Murali Sharma as Police Commissioner Balram
- Sampath Raj as Vasudeva IPS
- Rajiv Kumar Aneja as External affairs minister
- Shatru as Police Investigation Officer Rishi IPS
- Manikanth Dunaka as Vamsi, Police Inspector Special Team
- Madhurima as Care taker Sudhamma
- Divya Sripada as Leela
- Kalpika Ganesh as Teju
- Priyanka Sharma as Kaajal
- Preethi Asrani as Brinda, Yashoda's sister
- Pradeep Rudra as Anwar

== Production ==
=== Development ===
Actress Samantha signed a Telugu–Tamil bilingual film in October 2021, directed by the duo Hari Shankar and Harish Narayan under the production of Sridevi Movies. The film's title was announced as Yashoda in December 2021. After discussing with executive producer Senthil, the film was made only in Telugu.

=== Filming ===
With cinematography and editing by M. Sukumar and Marthand K. Venkatesh, respectively, principal photography began in December 2021.

After shooting for 100 days, filming was completed by July 2022, except for one song. CGI work and post-production works began subsequently.

== Music ==
All music is composed by Mani Sharma.

No.	Title	Lyrics	Singer(s)	Length
1.	"Baby Shower"	Ramajogayya Sastry	Sahithi Chaganti	5:03

== Release ==
=== Theatrical ===
Yashoda was initially scheduled to release on 12 August 2022, coinciding with Independence Day and Raksha Bandhan. It was postponed due to delay in filming. On 17 October 2022, the new release date was announced as 11 November 2022 where the film will be released in Telugu in addition to dubbed versions of Tamil, Hindi, Kannada and Malayalam languages.

The film made a pre-release business of ₹55 crore, including theatrical and digital streaming rights, which were sold at a cost of ₹11.50 crore and ₹20 crore respectively.

=== Home media ===
The film was premiered on Amazon Prime Video on 9 December 2022 in Telugu along with dubbed versions of Tamil, Hindi, Kannada and Malayalam languages. The Telugu version was premiered on television on 5 February 2023 on ETV.

== Reception ==
Yashoda received mixed reviews from critics and audience. Neeshitha Nyayapathi of The Times of India rated the film 3.5 out of 5 stars and wrote "Yashoda is the film to catch this weekend if you're looking for something beyond the usual masala fare or love stories." Priyanka Sundar of Firstpost rated the film 2.75 out of 5 stars and wrote "Samantha is brilliant in Yashoda that falters in effectively landing its shocking twists and turns". Manoj Kumar R of The Indian Express rated the film 2 out of 5 and wrote "Film's grindhouse treatment negates the impact of Samantha's performance which has a lot of conviction". Sowmya Rajendran of The News Minute rated the film 2.5 out of 5 stars and wrote "Yashoda has quite a few loose ends as it draws to a close, leaving the viewer dissatisfied".

Sudhir Srinivasan of Cinema Express rated the film 2.5 out of 5 stars and wrote "Fascinating ideas don't translate into exciting storytelling in this Samantha-led actioner". Sangeetha Dundoo of The Hindu wrote "But despite the missteps, it manages to be engaging." Arvind V of Pinkvilla rated the film 2.5 out of 5 and wrote "Mollywood actor Unni Mukundan is likely to become a sought-after name in Telugu cinema after this." Haricharan Pudipeddi of Hindustan Times wrote "The production design deserves a special mention since most of the story unfolds inside a large facility and the setwork is commendable." Janani K of India Today wrote "Yashoda could have been much better had the director duo concentrated on not stating the obvious."

Shrishti Negi of News18 gave 3 out of 5 stars and wrote "Yashoda requires patience and attention. Once you get through the first half, the film holds your complete attention, making it worthy of your time." A critic for India Herald wrote "Overall, the movie is at most mediocre. Samantha distinguishes out because she effortlessly handled a dual-shaded character. Excellent production values. The other casting is also excellent."
