= Sarangapani Jathakam =

2025 Indian Telugu film by Mohanakrishna Indraganti

- Theatrical release poster
- Directed by: Mohanakrishna Indraganti
- Produced by: Sivalenka Krishna Prasad
- Starring: Priyadarshi Pulikonda; Roopa Koduvayur; Naresh; Tanikella Bharani; Srinivas Avasarala; Vennela Kishore; Harsha Chemudu
- Cinematography: P. G. Vinda
- Edited by: Marthand K Venkatesh
- Music by: Vivek Sagar
- Production company: Sridevi Movies
- Release date: 25 April 2025
- Running time: 136 minutes
- Language: Telugu
- Box office: ₹5.65 crore

Sarangapani Jathakam (transl. Sarangapani's Horoscope) is a 2025 Telugu-language crime comedy drama film written and directed by Mohanakrishna Indraganti. It was produced by Sivalenka Krishna Prasad under Sridevi Movies. The film stars Priyadarshi Pulikonda, Roopa Koduvayur, Naresh, Tanikella Bharani, Srinivas Avasarala and Vennela Kishore in important roles. The film is released theatrically on 25 April 2025 and received positive reviews from critics.

== Plot ==
Sarangapani "Saranga," a car salesman, who is in a relationship with his boss, Mythili, and their families approve of their marriage. After his successful engagement, Sarangapani accidentally meets a well-known Cheiromantist called Jiggeswarananda "Jiggy" at one of his friend's parties There, he predicts that he will commit a murder in his lifetime. A firm believer in astrology, Sarangapani decides to kill a random bad person in an attempt to avert the predicted fate. To do the job, he asks his best friend Chandrasekhar's, "Chandu" help. Though Chandu resists at first, later he decides to help Sarangapani for committing a murder.

== Cast ==
- Priyadarshi Pulikonda as K. Sarangapani "Saranga"
- Roopa Koduvayur as Mythili Vemuri, Sarangapani's boss and love interest
- Srinivas Avasarala as Jiggeswarananda "Jiggy"; A Cheiromantist
- Tanikella Bharani as Ahobila Rao
- Vennela Kishore as Chandrasekhar "Chandu"
- Harsha Chemudu as Ramakrishna "Ramki"
- Vadlamani Srinivas as K. Pinakapani "Pinaka", Sarangapani's father
- Kalpa Latha as K. Devika, Sarangapani's mother
- Naresh as Naren Vemuri, Mythili’s father
- Rupa Lakshmi as Mythili's mother
- Harshini Koduru as Ramya
- Sivannarayana Naripeddi as "Vizag" Prasad
- Raja Chembolu as Rakesh
- Ashok Kumar as Yajulu
- Kadambari Kiran as Brahma Kumar
- Madhavi Prasad as Kalpana
- Pradeep Rudra as Simon, Mythili’s boss
- Ramesh Reddy as Basava
- Imax Venkat as Sunkara Indra Kumar; Jiggy's henchman.
- Nivita Manoj as Patupu Rekha, Jiggy's secret lover, and Ahobila Rao's wife.
- KLK Mani as Sundaramma
- Krishnateja as Revanth
- Ramana Bhargava as Ramesh
- Sameera Baradwaj as Rukmini "Ruks", Ramki's boss
- Thanuja as Julie, Ramki's colleague, and love interest.

== Production ==
The makers of the film revealed its title and first look on 25 August 2024, and the shooting wrapped up on 9 September 2024. The film's teaser was unveiled by Vijay Deverakonda on 21 November 2024. On 16 April 2025, the trailer of the film was released.

== Music ==
The soundtrack album and background score were composed by Vivek Sagar and Aditya Music acquired the audio rights of the film. The first single, "Sarango Saranga," was released on 26 October 2024. The lyrics were written by Ramajogayya Sastry, and the song was sung by Armaan Malik. On 2 December 2024, the lyrical video "Sanchari Sanchari" was released. The song's lyrics were also penned by Ramajogayya Sastry, with Sanjith Hegde providing the vocals.

No.	Title	Lyrics	Singer(s)	Length
1.	"Sarango Saranga"	Ramajogayya Sastry	Armaan Malik	4:22
2.	"Sanchari Sanchari"	Ramajogayya Sastry	Sanjith Hegde	3:50

== Release ==
Sarangapani Jathakam is released theatrical on 25 April 2025.

=== Home media ===
The film began streaming on Amazon Prime Video from 23 May 2025.The satellite rights were sold to ETV

== Reception ==
Sangeetha Devi Dundoo of The Hindu gave a positive review, describing the film as "laughter therapy and an entertaining blend of social satire and screwball comedy". Avvad Mohammad from OTT Play gave the film 3/5 stars and wrote "Sarangapani Jathakam was described as a clean comedy with hilarious performances and enough engaging moments to make it a breezy summer watch despite its routine storyline." Deccan Chronicle stated "Sarangapani Jathakam was praised as a lighthearted and enjoyable comedy, with strong performances and self-aware humor, despite a slightly weaker second half".
