= Jambulingam 3D =

2016 Indian film by Hari Shankar and Harish Narayan

- Tamil language movie poster
- Directed by: Hari Shankar; Hareesh Narayan
- Written by: Hari Shankar; Harish Narayan
- Produced by: G. Hari; K Okida
- Starring: Ambuli Gokulnath; Anjena Kirti
- Cinematography: Sathish. G.
- Edited by: Hari Shankar
- Music by: Srividya; K. Venkat Prabu Shankar
- Production companies: MSG Movies; Shankar Bros.
- Distributed by: MPL Films
- Release date: 13 May 2016 (India)
- Running time: 120 minutes
- Country: India
- Language: Tamil

Jambulingam 3D is a 2016 Indian Tamil language 3D adventure comedy film directed by Hari Shankar and Harish Narayan. The film stars Ambuli Gokulnath and Anjena Kirti in lead roles, while Baby Hamsika, Sukanya, Kalairani, Ashvin Raja, and Yog Japee play supporting roles. The film released on 13 May 2016. Filming for Jambulingam 3D took place extensively in Japan.

== Synopsis ==
When a young woman's daughter is captured, it is up to Jambulingam (Ambuli Gokulnath), a magician's apprentice, to rescue her.

== Cast ==
- Gokulnath as Jambulingam / Jumbo
- Anjena Kirti as Irene
- Baby Hamsika as Hamsi
- Sukanya as Sadhana
- Kalairani as Paapathi
- Ashvin Raja as Maanasthan
- Yog Japee as Vittal
- Kiyohito Okida as Don David
- Erode Mahesh as Sagunam
- Lollu Sabha Jeeva as Jeeva
- Shadow Thirumurugan as Thiru
- Iqbal as Ikku
- Senthil Kumaran as Kuzhanthai
- J. Gopalakrishnan as Munnar Doctor
- Yuichi Nakada as Sadhana's husband
- Sandy
- Gowthami Vembunathan

== Soundtrack ==
The songs of the film was composed by Srividya and lyrics written by Harish Raghavendra and Gangai Amaran.

== Reception ==
The Hindu wrote a critical review for Jamulingam 3D, stating that it was "silly and dull" and commenting that while it was aimed at children rather than adults "If any of them should enjoy this film though, I think we should all be justified in feeling concerned over the future of our world." The Times of India was equally dismissive, writing "Even on paper, the premise of Jambulingam feels thin, and on screen, it looks even worse. The film has been shot in 3D, but given how flat and unexciting the staging is, the 3D makes no difference; in fact, it only hurts the eyes."
