= Gokulnath =

Indian film actor

- Born: 12 August 1984 (age 42); Chennai, Tamil Nadu, India
- Occupation: Actor
- Years active: 2008–present

Gokulnath, also known Ambuli Gokulnath, is an Indian actor who has appeared in Tamil language films.

== Career ==
He worked as a mime artist for the reality television show Maanada Mayilada. He subsequently moved on to work in Tamil cinema, playing pivotal roles in films including Ambuli, Aaah and Jumbulingam 3D. Regarding his performance in Ambuli, a critic wrote, "Gokul [...] brings in genuineness to the role of Ambuli, through his animal-like movements". However, his performance in the other two films were mixed with a critic calling his performance in Aaah as "artificial" and in Jumbulingam 3D, a critic wrote, "[Gokul] busies himself with skits and mimes that I suspect would work better on stage than it does in cinema".

His highest profile film to date is Vikram, in which he played a minor role.

== Filmography ==
- Note: All films are in Tamil, unless otherwise noted.

Year	Film	Role	Notes
2010	Chapter 6	Bharath's friend	Telugu film
2010	Bale Pandiya		
2011	Pathayeram Kodi	Gokul	
2012	Ambuli	Ambuli	
2014	Aaaah	Thamizh	
2016	Jumbulingam 3D	Jumbulingam	
2017	Magalir Mattum	Balaji	
2019	Airaa	Francis	
2019	En Kaadhali Scene Podura		
2022	Vikram	Member of Sandhanam's gang Vetti Vagaiyara	
2022	Captain	Karuna	
2023	Bommai	Kumar	

=== Television ===
- Kalakka Povathu Yaaru?
- Maanada Mayilada (seasons 2–4, 7–8)
- Naalaya Iyakkunar
