= Aditya 369 =

1991 Indian film by Singeetam Srinivasa Rao

- Theatrical release poster
- Directed by: Singeetam Srinivasa Rao
- Written by: Singeetam Srinivasa Rao
- Dialogue by: Jandhyala
- Produced by: Sivalenka Krishna Prasad; S. P. Balasubrahmanyam (presenter)
- Starring: Nandamuri Balakrishna; Mohini
- Cinematography: Kabir Lal; V. S. R. Swamy
- Edited by: Gowtam Raju
- Music by: Ilayaraaja
- Production company: Sridevi Movies
- Release date: 18 July 1991
- Running time: 141 minutes
- Country: India
- Language: Telugu

Aditya 369 is a 1991 Indian Telugu-language science fiction film written and directed by Singeetam Srinivasa Rao. The film stars Nandamuri Balakrishna and Mohini, with Amrish Puri, Tinnu Anand, Suthi Velu, Master Tarun, Chandra Mohan, and Silk Smitha supporting roles. The music for the film was composed by Ilayaraja, and the dialogues were written by Jandhyala. Produced by S. Anitha Krishna under the Sridevi Movies banner, it was presented by S. P. Balasubrahmanyam. Aditya 369 received critical acclaim and won two state Nandi Awards.

Aditya 369 is the first time-travel film in Indian cinema and is regarded as an influential work in Indian science fiction. The film blends elements of history and science fiction, with a storyline centered around a time machine, which transports passengers to different time periods, including 1526 CE and a post-apocalyptic future in 2504 CE. It explores themes such as technology, democracy, and warfare. The film was inspired by H. G. Wells' novella The Time Machine (1895), which director Singeetam Srinivasa Rao read in college. The historical segments are set during the reign of Vijayanagara emperor Sri Krishnadevaraya (r. 1509–1529), while the futuristic elements were researched by the director at the American Library in Madras.

The film was made on a budget of approximately ₹1.60 crore and took about 110 days to shoot. Three cinematographers worked on the film, each handling different time periods. P. C. Sreeram shot the present-day scenes but had to leave due to health issues. Kabir Lal filmed the futuristic scenes, and V. S. R. Swamy took over the historical ones. The film was also dubbed in Hindi as Mission 369 and Tamil as Apoorva Sakthi 369.

== Plot ==
In 1991, Professor Ramdas develops a time machine called Aditya 369. Meanwhile, Raja Varma, a notorious art thief, targets a priceless 16th-century diamond from the Vijayanagara Empire displayed at the Salar Jung Museum. During a school trip, a young boy named Kishore witnesses Raja Varma's accomplices, Vasu and Dasu, steal the diamond and replace it with a replica. After rescuing Kishore from a near-fatal accident following the incident, Krishna Kumar takes him to a hospital. Krishna is in love with Ramdas's daughter, Hema, who dismisses her father's endeavours as impractical.

While visiting Hema, Krishna discovers the time machine. At the hospital, Kishore insists that the museum's diamond is fake, but no one believes him. After surviving an assassination attempt by Raja Varma's men, Kishore visits the museum with Krishna and reiterates his claim. Upon learning about Aditya 369 from Hema, Kishore realizes that they can use the time machine to travel back in time and verify the theft.

One night, Kishore sneaks into Ramdas's laboratory with several children and activates the time machine. Krishna and Hema get trapped inside the machine while trying to save them, along with a police constable pursuing a petty thief. The time machine transports the trio to 1526 CE, during the reign of the Vijayanagara Emperor, Sri Krishnadevaraya. After Krishna rescues the royal dancer, Simhanandini, from a group of thugs, she invites him to the royal court. By reciting a verse written by the poet Tenali Ramakrishna that has not yet been composed, Krishna proves to the Emperor that they are travellers from the future.

Krishna discovers the diamond in the royal prayer room and learns that it emits a divine seven-colour radiance under the moonlight on Karthika Pournami. An ancient prophecy reveals that the diamond is destined to be stolen twice: once during Sri Krishnadevaraya's reign and again after 500 years. The group decides to stay to witness the radiance on Karthika Pournami. Krishna further earns the Emperor's favour by predicting Ramakrishna's victory over the undefeated poet Narasa Kavi.

Simhanandini becomes infatuated with Krishna, but he firmly rejects her advances. Feeling humiliated, she conspires with the Senadhipati to frame Krishna for stealing the diamond. Although Krishna catches Senadhipati in the act, the latter falsely accuses Krishna before the Emperor. Ramakrishna uncovers the conspiracy but is abducted by Senadhipathi. With the help of Manjari, a court attendant and the constable's love interest, Ramakrishna escapes but Sri Krishnadevaraya, in disguise, rescues Krishna, Hema, and the constable, expressing his profound trust in them privately to Ramakrishna.

Using the time machine to return home, Krishna, Hema, and the constable encounter a malfunction that transports them to 2504 CE instead. They arrive in a post-apocalyptic world devastated by a third world war, where human survivors live underground and utilize nuclear radiation as energy source. Through an archived news report, Krishna discovers that he was reported dead in 1991 while attempting to retrieve the stolen diamond from Raja Varma. He urges the constable to keep it hidden from Hema.

Returning to 1991, the group finds that Raja Varma has kidnapped Ramdas and Kishore to gain control of Aditya 369. Krishna rescues the two and confronts Raja Varma atop a cliff, where the time machine explodes. Though assumed dead, Krishna survives the explosion by leaping into the water below just before the blast. Ramadas realizes the dangerous implications of altering time and dismantles his project, while an inspired Kishore aspires to become a scientist.

== Cast ==
- Balakrishna Nandamuri as Krishna Kumar and Sri Krishnadevaraya (dual role)
- Mohini as Hema (dubbed by S. P. Sailaja)
- Tinnu Anand as Prof. Ramdas (dubbed by S. P. Balasubrahmanyam)
- Master Tarun as Kishore
- Amrish Puri as Raja Varma
- Silk Smitha as Simha Nandani
- Chandra Mohan as Tenali Ramakrishna
- J. V. Somayajulu as Timmarusu
- Suthi Velu as Police Constable
- Brahmanandam as a scientist in 2504 CE
- Subhalekha Sudhakar as a scientist in 2504 CE
- Raavi Kondala Rao as a scientist in 2504 CE
- Gollapudi Maruti Rao as Museum Curator
- Chalapathi Rao as Senadhipathi
- Tanikella Bharani as Raja Varma's henchman
- Babu Mohan as Raja Varma's henchman
- Annapoorna as Dr. Lalita
- Sri Lakshmi as Madhavi
- Baby Raasi (credited as Baby Vijaya) as Kishore's friend
- Kinnera as Tirumala Devi
- Potti Prasad as Bhatudu

== Production ==
=== Development ===
The concept for Aditya 369 was inspired by H. G. Wells' novella The Time Machine (1895), which director Singeetam Srinivasa Rao had read during his student years. The idea of time travel intrigued Srinivasa Rao, and he developed a script to adapt the theme for the Telugu audience, focusing on its implications. The story was designed to explore journeys to the past and future, with the historical era of Sri Krishnadevaraya (r. 1509–1529) chosen for the former. To conceptualize the future, Srinivasa Rao conducted research at the American Library in Madras (now Chennai). Drawing inspiration, he imagined underground cities, thought-projection through speakers, and other futuristic elements, which he incorporated into the script. Though often compared to Back to the Future, Srinivasa Rao clarified that Aditya 369 was not inspired by it, and observers have noted that the similarities between the two stop "with the trouble that the protagonist faces in a different time zone".

The initial concept for the segment set in the era of Sri Krishnadevaraya focused on the political dynamics among the Ashtadiggajas, the eight renowned poets in his court. However, Srinivasa Rao decided against this approach, anticipating potential controversies and allegations of historical distortion. Instead, the storyline was adapted to include lighthearted and humorous elements. The revised narrative featured memorable scenes such as the comedic "Meka Thokaku Meka" sequence in Sri Krishnadevaraya's court, the lively rap interlude ("Rampampa Rampa Pampa") in the "Suramodham" song, and entertaining interactions between Suthi Velu and Sri Lakshmi. These additions brought a humorous tone to the film. The literary discussion scene in the royal court bears a resemblance to a similar scene in Tenali Ramakrishna (1956); however, Srinivasa Rao gave it a distinct treatment in this film.

During a flight between Bangalore and Madras, director Singeetam Srinivasa Rao shared the storyline of the film with singer S. P. Balasubrahmanyam, explaining its time travel theme and focus on the era of Sri Krishnadevaraya. Impressed by the idea, Balasubrahmanyam suggested Srinivasa Rao approach his relative, producer Sivalenka Krishna Prasad, who had previously produced the successful film Chinnodu Peddodu (1988). Balasubrahmanyam introduced Krishna Prasad to Srinivasa Rao, and they had a detailed discussion about the project. As Krishna Prasad was unfamiliar with the time travel genre, Srinivasa Rao provided him with video cassettes of Back to the Future Parts I (1985) and II (1989), as well as Time After Time (1979), to demonstrate how time travel is portrayed in these films. While the plot of Aditya 369 was entirely distinct from these films, the references helped Krishna Prasad understand the concept of time travel, which he was not previously familiar with.

After grasping the concept, Krishna Prasad had concerns about the challenge of creating a film based on such an unexplored idea in Indian cinema. However, Balasubrahmanyam reassured him, believing the film could be a landmark. This encouragement ultimately convinced Krishna Prasad to proceed with production. Srinivasa Rao later speculated that if he had not met Balasubrahmanyam on that flight, the film might not have been made. S. Anitha Krishna, Krishna Prasad's wife, was credited as the producer, and Balasubrahmanyam served as the presenter. Srinivasa Rao handled the story, screenplay, and direction, while Jandhyala wrote the dialogues.

=== Casting ===
Producer Krishna Prasad suggested casting Nandamuri Balakrishna for the role of Sri Krishnadevaraya. Balasubrahmanyam supported this suggestion and helped facilitate discussion with Balakrishna. Balakrishna immediately agreed after hearing the story and was eager to portray a character previously played by his father, N. T. Rama Rao. He prepared extensively, including wearing a heavy crown to ensure an authentic performance. Initially, Kamal Haasan was considered for the role of Krishna Kumar, and a multi-starrer featuring both actors was even planned. However, due to Kamal Haasan's prior commitments, Balakrishna took on both roles.

Vijayashanti was initially considered for the female lead, but scheduling conflicts led to the casting of Mohini, who was acquainted with cinematographer P. C. Sreeram. This film marked Mohini's Telugu debut, with her voice dubbed by S. P. Sailaja. Hindi actor Tinu Anand was cast as the scientist who invents the time machine, and his voice was dubbed by S. P. Balasubrahmanyam. Amrish Puri was cast as the primary antagonist, while Suthi Velu, Chandra Mohan, Silk Smita, and child actors Tarun and Raasi appeared in supporting roles.

=== Filming ===
The production of the film began in 1990, with P. C. Sreeram initially handling the cinematography for the present-day scenes. However, after completing the first schedule, he stepped down due to health issues. V. S. R. Swamy subsequently took over cinematography for the historical era scenes, while Kabir Lal managed the cinematography for the futuristic sequences. And this worked to the advantage of the film, as each cameraperson had a different style and could help in showing the variations between the past, present and future. Peketi Ranga handled the art direction, while A. Sambasiva Rao was responsible for the costumes.

Producer Krishna Prasad initially estimated that a budget of ₹1.30 crore would ensure the project's financial viability. However, the costs increased by an additional ₹30 lakh. The sets constructed at Annapurna Studios and the concept of the time machine had already captured public interest, prompting distributors to cover the additional expenses. Ultimately, the total expenditure ranged between ₹1.52 crore and ₹1.60 crore.

The scenes depicting Krishnadevaraya's era were filmed at Annapurna Studios in Hyderabad, while the initial sequences featuring the time machine were shot at Vauhini Studios in Madras. For certain scenes, the time machine prop was transported on a large truck to locations such as the Talakona forest in Andhra Pradesh. The futuristic sequences were filmed on specially constructed sets at VGP Golden Beach, Madras. Practical effects were employed to depict a post-apocalyptic world devastated by World War Three. Filming the future-related sequences required the most time due to the uniqueness of the concept and the practical challenges involved.

The song "Jaanavule" was filmed on two floors at Annapurna Studios and recorded at Prasad Studios. The choreography was handled by Sundaram Master, with his sons Prabhu Deva and Raju Sundaram assisting him. Additionally, Prabhu Deva independently choreographed the song "Centurylu Kotte Vayassu Maadi".

Due to limited visual effects technology in India at the time, the film was shot using a VHS camera and later transferred to film negative. After completing the filming, the team traveled to London for the graphics work.

=== Title ===
Several titles, including Kaalayantram, Yuga Purushudu, and Adityudu were considered before Aditya 369 was finalized. The title was chosen to symbolize the Sun (Aditya), which transcends time and eras, while the number 369 represents the time machine's serial number. The ascending sequence of numbers was selected to signify the concept of time travel.

== Music ==
Aditya 369

Film score by Ilayaraja
- Released: 1991
- Genre: Soundtrack
- Length: 25:52
- Label: LEO Audio
- Producer: Ilayaraja

Ilayaraja chronology
Coolie No. 1 (1991)	Aditya 369 (1991)	Killer (1991)

The music for the film was composed by Ilayaraja and released under the Leo Music Company label. The soundtrack is regarded as one of the best in Balakrishna's career, with songs like "Jaanavule" and "Raasaleela Vela" becoming instant hits among music lovers.

For the song "Jaanavule", director Srinivasa Rao wanted a semi-classical tune inspired by old historical films, featuring vocalizations like "aahaa ha... Oho ho", typical of early talkie songs. Jikki was chosen to sing the song, and S. Janaki, who was in the studio, stayed until the recording was finished to help Jikki with her lines.

Aditya 369 track listing
No.	Title	Lyrics	Singer(s)	Length
1.	"Jaanavule"	Veturi	Jikki, S. P. Sailaja, S. P. Balasubrahmanyam	5:00
2.	"Raasaleela Vela"	Vennelakanti	S. Janaki, S. P. Balasubrahmanyam	5:07
3.	"Centurylu Kotte Vayassu"	Veturi	S. Janaki, S. P. Balasubrahmanyam	4:53
4.	"Chilipi Yaatralo"	Sirivennela Seetharama Sastry	K. S. Chithra, S. P. Balasubrahmanyam	4:45
5.	"Suramodamu"	Veturi	S. Janaki, S. P. Balasubrahmanyam, Sunanda, Singeetam Srinivasa Rao	6:07
Total length:				25:52

== Marketing ==
Producer Sivalenka Krishnaprasad, aiming to enhance Aditya 369's visibility, requested Chiranjeevi's participation in the film's promotional campaign. Chiranjeevi agreed to appear in an advertisement, which was broadcast on Doordarshan. This promotional effort helped attract a wider audience, particularly among families and younger viewers, contributing to the film's success.

== Reception ==
=== Critical response ===
The film, granted a 'U' certificate by the Censor Board, was released on 18 July 1991. It received positive reviews, with commendation for its technical aspects, music, cinematography, visual effects, production design, and performances by the cast.

In a retrospective review, Gudipoodi Srihari describes Aditya 369 as "an interesting and entertaining film" that blends science fiction with history, praising its performances, music, cinematography, and technical strengths. In 2020, Balakrishna Ganeshan of The News Minute wrote, "The film is considered to be a masterpiece because it perfectly blended the genre of sci-fi and drama with the mainstream template of songs and fight sequences to make it an entertaining watch. It also unlocked the imagination of scores of people to look beyond our realm by popularising Albert Einstein's theories of time and relativity."

=== Box office ===
Aditya 369 was a box office success. However, its earnings were not as high as those of Balakrishna's commercial potboilers released around the same time. The film was later dubbed into Tamil as Apoorva Sakthi 369, which was released in August 1992 and also met with success. It was subsequently dubbed into Hindi under the title Mission 369.

== Themes ==
Aditya 369 is regarded as the first Indian film based on time travel. The film blends elements of science fiction and historical fiction, exploring themes of time travel, democracy, technology, and warfare. It contrasts two distinct time periods: the grandeur of the Vijayanagara Empire in 1526 and a post-apocalyptic future in 2504.

The film portrays the Vijayanagara Empire under Emperor Sri Krishnadevaraya in an idealized light, showcasing a society where the streets are filled with pearls and diamonds, and theft is unheard of. Krishnadevaraya is depicted as a noble ruler, symbolizing the virtues of the past. However, the narrative also highlights the advancements of modernity, suggesting that democracy and technological progress have improved the world. Krishna Kumar's casual explanations of modern concepts to people of the past serve as playful critiques of historical structures.

In addition to the historical setting, Aditya 369 presents a post-apocalyptic future. Set in 2504, the future world is depicted as a devastated Earth, scarred by the aftermath of World War III. Nuclear radiation has rendered the surface of the planet uninhabitable, forcing humanity to live underground in hermetically sealed structures. Advanced technology helps people adapt to this harsh reality, with devices such as "stomach computers" that notify individuals when to eat, machines that interpret thoughts, and "Dragon Walk," a precursor to modern music-streaming platforms. The society is heavily reliant on technology, with people embracing it with amusement rather than cynicism.

The film adopts a light-hearted and adventurous approach to time travel, with characters interacting with historical figures without concern for altering the past. Unlike typical time travel stories that explore the consequences of changing history, Aditya 369 presents a world where the past and future coexist without significant changes to the timeline. Kali Wallace of Reactor observed that the narrative focuses on this coexistence rather than the disruption of history. She also noted that the film neither idealizes the past nor emphasizes the potential dark ages of the future, describing it as "a celebration of the present."

At its core, Aditya 369 follows the classic hero's journey, with Krishna Kumar overcoming various challenges to thwart the villain, Raja Varma. The film maintains an optimistic tone, celebrating heroism and the triumph of good over evil. The diamond serves as a central element connecting the past, present, and future timelines, playing a crucial role in the plot across all three eras.

== Legacy ==
Aditya 369 is regarded as an influential film in the science fiction genre within Telugu and Indian cinema, pioneering time travel-themed storytelling in the country.

The film has been praised by several filmmakers. Director Nag Ashwin has cited Aditya 369, alongside Bhairava Dweepam, as one of his favourite films. Similarly, director Venkatesh Maha has expressed admiration for the film, describing it, along with Bhairava Dweepam, as a "courageous" effort for its time. Actor and producer Nandamuri Kalyan Ram has cited Aditya 369 as one of his favourites, crediting it as an influence on the production of Bimbisara (2022).

The 2021 film Adbhutham references Aditya 369, with its climax drawing inspiration from the earlier film. Director Raghavendra Varma Indukuri of Bombhaat (2020) also credited Aditya 369 as a key inspiration for making an accessible and entertaining science fiction film. In the 2023 film Bro, a song titled "Jaanavule" was named after the popular track from Aditya 369.

== Future ==
In January 2017, Srinivasa Rao announced his intention to work on Aditya 369's sequel. Later, it is reported that the sequel would feature Balakrishna along with his son Mokshagna. The sequel titled Aditya 999 Max was reportedly written by Balakrishna in just one night. After years of speculation, Balakrishna confirmed on Unstoppable in December 2024 that the sequel will begin production in 2025, with Mokshagna starring. The director for the film remains unconfirmed.

== Awards ==
Nandi Awards

- Best Art Director - Peketi Ranga
- Best Costume Designer - A. Samba Siva Rao

== See also ==
- Science fiction films in India
