= Ooyala (film) =

1998 film by S. V. Krishna Reddy

- Directed by: S. V. Krishna Reddy
- Written by: Divakar Babu (dialogues)
- Produced by: Sivalenka Krishna Prasad
- Starring: Srikanth; Ramya Krishna; Nassar; Suhasini
- Cinematography: Sarath
- Music by: S. V. Krishna Reddy
- Production company: Sridevi Movies
- Release date: 14 January 1998
- Country: India
- Language: Telugu

Ooyala (transl. Cradle) is a 1998 Telugu-language drama film written, directed, and composed by S. V. Krishna Reddy. It stars Srikanth, Ramya Krishna, Nassar and Suhasini. The film is produced by Sivalenka Krishna Prasad on Sridevi Movies banner. It is a remake of the Malayalam film Irattakuttikalude Achan (1997).

This film is about a couple sacrificing one of their twins to another childless couple. The film was a box office failure.

== Cast ==
- Srikanth as Raja
- Ramya Krishna as Swapna
- Nassar
- Suhasini
- S. P. Balasubrahmanyam
- Brahmanandam
- Mallikarjuna Rao
- Sudhakar
- AVS
- Rajitha

== Music ==
The music was composed by S. V. Krishna Reddy.

Track list
No.	Title	Lyrics	Singer(s)	Length
1.	"Jariginadanta Nijamani"	Sirivennela Seetharama Sastry	S. P. Balasubrahmanyam, K. S. Chithra	4:53
2.	"Gopala Baludamma"	Sirivennela Seetharama Sastry	K. S. Chithra	4:18
3.	"Nagamalli Konallo"	Bhuvana Chandra	S. P. Balasubrahmanyam, Sunitha	4:31
4.	"Taraka Digivachi"	Chandrabose	S. P. Balasubrahmanyam, K. S. Chithra	4:04
5.	"Putthadi Bommanti"	Sirivennela Seetharama Sastry	S. P. Balasubrahmanyam, Sunitha	4:38
6.	"Emanukunna Emaina"	Sirivennela Seetharama Sastry	S. P. Balasubrahmanyam	3:42
Total length:				26:06

== Reception ==
Griddhaluru Gopala Rao of Zamin Ryot reviewed the film positively praising the story, screenplay and the comedy. He noted, "The director has made the film in a healthy manner without any vulgarity. It can be watched by everyone". A critic from Andhra Today wrote that "Directed by S. V. Krishna Reddy, it comes as a big let down to the audience who set high hopes on his movies".
