= Bosskey =

Indian actor

- Born: Bhaskar Balasubramanian; 11 February 1962 (age 64)
- Occupations: Film Actor, Television Anchor
- Years active: 1977-present
- Spouse: Vasanthi
- Children: 1

Bosskey is an Indian Film Actor, Radio Jockey, Cricketer, Television Anchor, stand-up comedian and film critic working in the Tamil film and media industry.

== Career ==
Bosskey has anchored Television Shows such as Hari Giri Assembly (1000 daily comedy interviews) and Siri Giri Station in Jaya TV and appeared in 18 Tamil films in comedy and character roles. Bosskey presented Sollunga Boss program (1000 shows) in Sun TV and Kashayam with Bosskey a Tamil cinema review program (300 film reviews) in YouTube's Indiaglitz Tamil channel. Bosskey has presented around 5000 Radio Shows in Radio Mirchi, Big FM and Suryan FM. Bosskey has also written 17000 jokes for Ananda Vikatan magazine. Bosskey also ran Giri Giri column in Ananda Vikatan. Bosskey hosted as a Stand-up comedian in Idhu Epdi Irukku in Star Vijay. Bosskey also worked as an Anchor for Kishkinta's Manthira Arai. Bosskey's Indepth and Troll review of Indian Premier League 2020 can be seen on Behindwoods Air, YouTube channel after the end of every single match and the show is received well amongst the Tamil Cricket Fans.

== Filmography ==
Year	Film	Role(s)	Notes
2000	Unakkaga Mattum	Fruitseller	
2002	Youth	Giri	
2003	Dhool	News Editor	
2004	Ethiri	Doctor	
2005	Sivakasi	Leo	
2006	Dharmapuri		
2008	Poi Solla Porom	Asif Bhai	
2010	Nagaram Marupakkam	Inspector Venatesh	
2011	Uyarthiru 420		
2012	Ambuli	Velpari	
2012	Mirattal		
2013	Thillu Mullu		Special appearance
2013	Theeya Velai Seiyyanum Kumaru	"Mottai" Mama	
2013	Moondru Per Moondru Kadhal	Interviewer	
2019	Jiivi	Police Informer	
2021	Pei Mama	Rajagopal	
