= Upper Sileru Project Site Camp =

- Village
- Interactive map of Upper Sileru Project Site Camp
- Location in Andhra Pradesh, India
- Coordinates: 18.0491°N 82.0353°E
- Country: India
- State: Andhra Pradesh
- District: Alluri Sitharama Raju
- Mandal: Gudem Kotha Veedhi

Population (2001)
  - Total: 4,744

Languages
  - Official: Telugu
- Time zone: UTC+5:30 (IST)
- PIN: 531105
- Telephone code: 08938

Upper Sileru Project Site Camp is a Donkarai Road in Gudem Kotha Veedhi mandal of Alluri Sitharama Raju district in the Indian state of Andhra Pradesh.

== Demographics ==
As of 2001 India census, Upper Sileru Project Site Camp had a population of 4744. Males constitute 54% of the population and females 46%. Upper Sileru Project Site Camp has an average literacy rate of 61%, higher than the national average of 59.5%: male literacy is 72%, and female literacy is 47%. In Upper Sileru Project Site Camp, 13% of the population is under 6 years of age.

Upper sileru project site camp is surrounded by a number of scenic places. It is a paradise for nature lovers. This area is full of forests with rich biodiversity.

== Upper Sileru Hydro Power House ==
Upper Sileru Power project was built on Sileru River in Power Generation. Sileru river enters to Andhra Pradesh from Orissa through Upper Sileru. The same river passes through Donkarai and Mothu Gudem (Lower Sileru). The total power generation capacity of Upper Seleru project is 240 MW. The projected owned and operated by APGENCO.

People say the name of the river means Selayeru(సెలయేరు). It also has a UBI branch office.
