= Hari Shankar and Harish Narayan =

Indian film director duo

Hari and Harish
- Born: K. Hari Shankar; February 19, 1978 (age 48); Karur, Tamil Nadu India; S. Harish; April 19, 1983 (age 43); Madras (Present: Chennai), Tamil Nadu, India
- Other names: Hari & Harish
- Occupations: Directors, Writers
- Years active: 2010–present

Hari Shankar (born February 19, 1978) and Harish Narayan (born April 19, 1983) are an Indian director and writer duo predominantly working in Tamil film industry. Hari and Harish are pioneers as filmmakers of three consecutive first-of-its-kind movies in Tamil, namely Orr Eravuu (2010), India's First Viewpoint film, Ambuli (2012), first stereoscopic 3D Tamil film and Aaaah (2014), first horror anthology Tamil film.

In 2022, Hari and Harish made their Telugu cinema directorial debut with Yashoda, starring Samantha Ruth Prabhu.

== Filmography ==
- Note: all films are in Tamil, unless otherwise noted.

List of films as director
Year	Title	Director	
2010	Orr Eravuu	Yes	Co-directed with Krishna Sekhar
2012	Ambuli	Yes	
2014	Aaaah	Yes	
2016	Jumbulingam	Yes	
2022	Yashoda	Yes	Telugu film

== Awards ==
List of Awards
Year	Title	Association	Festival/Awards	Category	To	Result	Ref.
2010	Orr Eravuu	Indo Cine Appreciation Foundation (ICAF)	8th Chennai International Film Festival (CIFF)	Best Tamil Independent Film	Producer: Hari Shankar; Directors: Hari Shankar, Harish Narayan, Krishna Shekar	Won	
