= Upendra Matte Baa =

- Directed by: N. Arun Lokanath
- Written by: Upendra (dialogues)
- Screenplay by: N. Arun lokanath
- Based on: Soggade Chinni Nayana by Kalyan Krishna Kurasala
- Produced by: M. S. Sreekanth; M. S. Shashikanth; K. L. Ravindranath
- Starring: Upendra; Sruthi Hariharan; Prema
- Cinematography: Swamy J. Gowda
- Edited by: Joni Harsha
- Music by: V. Sridhar
- Production company: Hayagreeva Enterprises
- Release date: 17 November 2017
- Running time: 150 minutes
- Country: India
- Language: Kannada

Upendra Matte Baa (transl. Come again Upendra) is a 2017 Indian Kannada-language supernatural drama film directed by N. Arun Lokanath (Loki). The film stars Upendra in dual roles along with Prema and Sruthi Hariharan. The film, a remake of Telugu-language film Soggade Chinni Nayana (2016), was produced by M. S. Sreekanth, M. S. Shashikanth and K. L. Ravindranath under the banner Hayagreeva Enterprises. The film's cinematography was handled by Swamy J. Gowda. The soundtrack and film score were composed by V. Sridhar.

The project marks the reunion of Upendra with director Loki after their previous film H_{2}O in 2002. It also marks the comeback of actress Prema to films after a long hiatus which she took after Shishira (2009).

== Plot ==
Ram "Ramu" Mohan is a socially-inept cardiologist practicing in the United States. His wife, Seetha, feels lonely since Ramu pays very little attention to her because of his work. They decide to divorce and leave for Sivapuram, Rajahmundry, where Ramu's mother Satyabhama lives. Satyabhama, shocked to learn that Ramu and Seetha are divorcing, shouts at a portrait of her deceased husband Upendra Raju (a benevolent, flirtatious zamindar who died nearly 30 years ago in an accident).

Upendra Raju's soul is in Naraka, where he continues to flirt. Yama, at Shiva's command, sends him back to earth because there is a mission only he can fulfil. Upendra Raju, who can be seen and heard only by Satyabhama, tries to solve his family's problems. After several unsuccessful attempts, Upendra Raju possesses Ramu's body on his birthday. He meets Ramu's young female cousins, and invites them to his home. On his way back Ramu meets Suri, a frightened drunk who runs away as Ramu and Upendra Raju look identical. To free himself from guilt, Suri later admits that he murdered Upendra Raju with a lorry after he was bribed. Before he can disclose more details, Suri dies in an accident and Upendra Raju learns that his family is in danger. Ramu spends quality time with his cousins, making Seetha jealous.

Upendra Raju is confronted by Satyabhama, who is unaware of recent events. He suggests that she help Seetha impress Ramu. At Satyabhama's suggestion, Ramu and Seetha go to a theatre to watch a film. When she is taunted, Ramu (possessed by Upendra Raju) overpowers her tormenters. Seetha is pleasantly surprised, since Ramu failed to confront the same group earlier in a similar situation. The couple slowly grow closer, and Seetha realises that Ramu does love her. Upendra Raju learns from Athmanandam, a godman who can communicate with souls, that his uncle Rudraraju masterminded his murder. Rudraraju and his cousin, Veerababu, wanted to steal jewellery from a 1,000-year old temple to Shiva. They murdered Upendra Raju, bribing Suri to silence him.

After Rudraraju's son dies when he is bitten by a divine snake, a tantrik warns that only Upendra Raju's descendants can open the lock; others would be killed by the snake. The tantrik captures Upendra Raju's soul and gives a few threads to Sampath, Rudraraju's grandson, telling him to tie them to the hands of every member of Upendra Raju's family to keep his soul from communicating with them. After Sampath and the others leave, the snake kills the tantrik and saves Upendra Raju's soul.

Upendra Raju reaches the temple, where Satyabhama can neither see nor hear him and he cannot possess Ramu. Rudraraju and Sampath attack Ramu and Seetha after the jewellery is removed from the treasury. Rudraraju tells his henchmen to put the couple in a car with the jewellery, which will make the villagers think that they are the thieves. The thread to Ramu's hand comes loose, and Upendra Raju possesses him. Upendra Raju fights them and retrieves the jewellery before leaving Ramu, who operates on an injured Seetha in a nearby hospital. Satyabhama removes the thread and can see Upendra Raju. Ramu and Seetha reconcile, and Yama orders Upendra Raju to come back in accordance with Shiva's instructions. When Satyabhama begs Upendra Raju to stay, Yama gives him a chance to wipe away her tears. He asks her to keep smiling and live happily for his sake, and returns to Naraka.

== Cast ==
- Upendra in a dual role as
  - Upendra Raju
  - Ramu
- Prema as Sathyabhama, Upendra Raju's Wife
- Sruthi Hariharan as Seetha
- Harshika Poonacha
- Sai Kumar as Yamadharmaraju
- Avinash as Rudraraju
- Vasishta N. Simha as Vashishta
- Sadhu Kokila as Atmananda
- Shobaraj as Truck Driver
- Chamaraj Mulakeri

== Soundtrack ==
Upendra Matte Baa

Soundtrack album by V. Sridhar
- Released: 16 September 2017
- Recorded: 2017
- Genre: Feature film soundtrack
- Label: Anand Audio
- Producer: V. Sridhar

V. Sridhar scored the soundtrack and score for this, his 25th film. A total of four songs were composed by him. The audio was released in September 2017 and Anand Audio bagged the audio rights of the film.

Tracklist
No.	Title	Lyrics	Singer(s)	Length
1.	"Madikke Henda"	V. Sridhar	Vijay Prakash, Kushala, Chintan Vikas
2.	"Ondu Nimisha"	Kaviraj	Anuradha Bhat
3.	"Premave"	K. Kalyan	Hariharan
4.	"Sakkare Hange"	V. Sridhar	Hemanth Kumar, Shamita Malnad, Shilpa

== See also ==
- Soggade Chinni Nayana
