= Soggade Chinni Nayana =

2016 Indian Telugu-language film

- Theatrical release poster
- Directed by: Kalyan Krishna Kurasala
- Screenplay by: Satyanand
- Story by: Ram Mohan P
- Produced by: Nagarjuna
- Starring: Nagarjuna; Ramya Krishna; Lavanya Tripathi
- Cinematography: P. S. Vinod; Siddhardh Ramaswamy
- Edited by: Prawin Pudi
- Music by: Anup Rubens
- Production company: Annapurna Studios
- Distributed by: Annapurna Studios
- Release date: 15 January 2016
- Running time: 145 minutes
- Country: India
- Language: Telugu
- Budget: ₹15–20 crore (Note: The broadsheet newspaper Daily News and Analysis estimates the film's budget as ₹15 crore.)

Soggade Chinni Nayana (transl. The young man is a charmer) is a 2016 Indian Telugu-language supernatural drama film directed by Kalyan Krishna Kurasala and written by Satyanand and Ram Mohan P. In addition to producing the film under his Annapurna Studios banner, Nagarjuna played dual roles, starring alongside Ramya Krishna and Lavanya Tripathi. Nassar, Mahadevan, Sampath Raj and Brahmanandam played supporting roles. The film revolves around the soul of Bangarraju, a flirtatious zamindar whom Yama sends back to earth to reconcile his son (Ram "Ramu" Mohan) and his wife Seetha, who are on the brink of divorce. In the process, he learns about his death and its connection with a local Shiva temple.

P. S. Vinod and Siddhardh Ramaswami provided the cinematography, and Anup Rubens composed the film's soundtrack and background score. Prawin Pudi edited the film. Principal photography for the film began on 19 November 2014 after it was launched in Hyderabad, and wrapped on 4 October 2015. Most of the film was shot in and around Rajahmundry and Mysore.

Produced on a budget of ₹15–20 crore, Soggade Chinni Nayana was released worldwide on 15 January 2016 during the Makar Sankranti festival season in 390-410 screens. It received positive reviews from critics and was commercially successful, earning ₹82 crore globally. The film was remade in Kannada as Upendra Matte Baa (2017). A sequel titled Bangarraju was released in 2022.

== Plot ==
Ram "Ramu" Mohan is a socially-inept cardiologist practicing in the United States. His wife, Seetha, feels lonely since Ramu pays very little attention to her because of his work. They decide to divorce and leave for Sivapuram, Rajahmundry, where Ramu's mother Satyabhama lives. Satyabhama, shocked to learn that Ramu and Seetha are divorcing, shouts at a portrait of her deceased husband Bangarraju (a benevolent, flirtatious zamindar who died nearly 30 years ago in an accident).

Bangarraju's soul is in Naraka, where he continues to flirt. Yamaraj, at Lord Shiva's command, sends him back to earth because there is a mission only he can fulfill. Bangarraju, who can be seen and heard only by Satyabhama, tries to solve his family's problems. After several unsuccessful attempts, Bangarraju possesses Ramu's body on his birthday. He meets Ramu's young female cousins, and invites them to his home. On his way back Ramu meets Suri, a frightened drunk who runs away as Ramu and Bangarraju look identical. To free himself from guilt, Suri confesses that he murdered Bangarraju with a lorry after he was bribed. Before he can disclose more details, Suri dies in an accident and Bangarraju learns that his family is in danger. Ramu spends quality time with his cousins, making Seetha jealous.

Bangarraju is confronted by Satyabhama, who is unaware of recent events. He suggests that she help Seetha impress Ramu. At Satyabhama's suggestion, Ramu and Seetha go to a theatre to watch a film. When she is taunted, Ramu (possessed by Bangarraju) overpowers her tormenters. Seetha is pleasantly surprised, since Ramu failed to confront the same group earlier in a similar situation. The couple slowly grow closer, and Seetha realises that Ramu does love her. Bangarraju learns from Athmanandam, a godman who can communicate with souls, that his uncle Rudraraju masterminded his murder. Rudraraju and his cousin, Veerababu, wanted to steal jewellery from a 1,000-year old temple of Lord Shiva. They murdered Bangarraju, bribing Suri to silence him.

After Rudraraju's son dies when he is bitten by a divine snake, a tantrik warns that only Bangarraju's descendants can open the lock; others would be killed by the snake. The tantrik captures Bangarraju's soul and gives a few threads to Sampath, Rudraraju's grandson, telling him to tie them to the arm of every member of Bangarraju's family to keep his soul from communicating with them. After Sampath and the others leave, the snake kills the tantrik and saves Bangarraju's soul.

Bangarraju reaches the temple, where Satyabhama can neither see nor hear him and he cannot possess Ramu. Rudraraju and Sampath attack Ramu and Seetha after the jewellery is removed from the treasury. Rudraraju tells his henchmen to put the couple in a car with the jewellery, which will make the villagers think that they are the thieves. The thread to Ramu's hand comes loose, and Bangarraju possesses him. Bangarraju fights them and retrieves the jewellery before leaving Ramu, who operates on an injured Seetha in a nearby hospital. Satyabhama removes the thread and can see Bangarraju. Ramu and Seetha reconcile, and Yamraj orders Bangarraju to return in accordance with Lord Shiva's instructions. When Satyabhama begs Bangarraju to stay, Yamraj gives him a chance to wipe away her tears. He asks her to keep smiling and live happily for his sake, and returns to Yamlok.

== Cast ==
- Nagarjuna in a dual role as
  - Bangarraju
  - Dr. Ram Mohan "Ramu"
- Lavanya Tripathi as Seetha
- Ramya Krishna as Satyabhama "Satya"
- Nassar as Rudraraju
- Mahadevan as Veerababu
- Sampath Raj as Sampath
- Brahmanandam as Aathmanandam
- Nagendra Babu as Yamadharmaraju
- Duvvasi Mohan as Chitragupta
- Posani Krishna Murali as Suri
- Chalapathi Rao as Chalapathi
- Brahmaji as Ramu's cousin, Chalapathi's Son
- Vennela Kishore as Ramu's cousin
- Banerjee as Sampath's father
- Saptagiri as Himagiri
- L. B. Sriram as the temple priest
- Jhansi as Saraswathi
- Venu Yeldandi

=== Special appearances ===
- Anushka Shetty as Krishna Kumari
- Anasuya Bharadwaj as Bujji
- Hamsa Nandini as Hamsa
- Diksha Panth as Hamsa's sister

== Production ==
During the production of Manam (2014), producer and lead actor Nagarjuna liked the portions which were set against a village backdrop. He developed an interest in making a film based on Indian village life, feeling that audiences would see a "new, yet traditional lifestyle, something fresh and interesting". After sketching the basic idea, Ram Mohan P approached Virinchi Varma to direct the film; Mohan produced Varma's directorial debut, Uyyala Jampala (2013). Varma declined the offer, since he wanted to film his own script. Nagarjuna then gave the synopsis to Kalyan Krishna Kurasala, who completed the script within a month. Kurasala was confirmed as director, marking his directorial debut in Telugu cinema. Nagarjuna approved the inclusion of supernatural elements, such as the ghost of Bangarraju and the divine snake guarding his family, on the condition that they be positive and not frightening. The film was titled as Soggade Chinni Nayana named after the song from 1966 film Aastiparulu starring Akkineni Nageswara Rao.

He played two roles: Bangarraju, a flirtatious zamindar, and his son Ramu (a socially-inept doctor, born the day after Bangarraju's death). Ramu's character was based on Umakanth, a contestant on Meelo Evaru Koteeswarudu (a game show hosted by Nagarjuna). As Bangarraju, Nagarjuna wore a dhoti and a 1959 watch; both were worn by his father, Akkineni Nageswara Rao, in his many village-film starring roles. Ramya Krishnan and Lavanya Tripathi were the female leads; Pranitha Subhash and Sonal Chauhan were considered before Tripathi was cast. Initially skeptical about playing a married woman, Tripathi agreed after listening to a script reading at the Annapurna Studios office. In a January 2016 interview with The Hindu, Nagarjuna mentioned that Bangarraju and Satyabhama (played by Ramya) would be a "hot, romantic" couple, in contrast to the "innocent, cute" Ramu and Seetha (played by Tripathi). After being cast, Tripathi said that her character, a traditional Indian girl, would have a romantic touch.

L. Satyanand wrote Soggade Chinni Nayana's screenplay, and Anup Rubens composed its soundtrack and score. P. S. Vinod and Siddhardh Ramaswami were the cinematographers. Prawin Pudi and Ravinder Reddy were in charge of the film's editing and art direction respectively. A launch ceremony was held on 19 November 2014 at Annapurna Studios in Hyderabad, and principal photography began several hours later on a set erected in the Studios' premises. Anushka Shetty made a cameo appearance in the film. Hamsa Nandini confirmed her inclusion in the cast in December 2014; she played a supporting role and participated in a song with Nagarjuna. Raju Sundaram, Vishwa and Raghu choreographed the songs. Television presenter Anasuya Bharadwaj played Nagarjuna's cousin after Swathi Reddy backed out, citing scheduling conflicts. Diksha Panth also made a cameo appearance; her inclusion was confirmed in August 2015.

Nagarjuna had to simultaneously complete his portions of Oopiri (2016) and Meelo Evaru Koteeswarudu during 2015. Filming resumed on 11 February 2015 after completion of two schedules. Principal photography continued in Mysore on 10 March 2015 after key sequences were filmed in and around Rajahmundry. Several scenes were filmed at a 1,500-year-old Vishnu temple in Kere Thonnur village in Mandya District. In September 2015, with Soggade Chinni Nayana nearing completion, its film unit told Indo-Asian News Service that a few key scenes would be re-filmed on the advice of writer Sai Madhav Burra (who changed some scenes to suit the story). The re-filming delayed its release. Principal photography wrapped on 4 October 2015 in Mysore, and post-production began shortly afterwards. Soggade Chinni Nayana was produced on a budget of ₹150–200 million.

== Music ==
Soggade Chinni Nayana

Soundtrack album by Anup Rubens
- Released: 29 December 2015
- Recorded: 2015
- Genre: Soundtrack
- Length: 21:39
- Label: Aditya Music
- Producer: Anup Rubens

Anup Rubens chronology
Soukhyam (2015)	Soggade Chinni Nayana (2015)	Padesave (2016)

The six-song Soggade Chinni Nayana soundtrack was composed by Anup Rubens; however, its initial release had only five songs. Ramajogayya Sastry wrote the lyrics for two songs: "Vasthane Vasthane" and "Untale". Bhaskarabhatla, Balaji and Krishna Kanth wrote the lyrics of one song each. The title song was written by Anantha Sreeram and performed by Satya Yamini, Nuthana and Vinayak. The soundtrack, on Aditya Music, was released on 25 December 2015 with a promotional event at Shilpakala Vedika, Hyderabad.

Telugu Track-List
No.	Title	Lyrics	Singer(s)	Length
1.	"Dikka Dikka Dum Dum"	Bhaskarabhatla Ravi Kumar	Akkineni Nagarjuna, Dhanunjay, Mohana Bhogaraju	4:07
2.	"Nee Navve"	Balaji	Shreya Ghoshal, Dhanunjay	4:27
3.	"Vasthane Vasthane"	Ramajogayya Sastry	Hariharan, Kousalya	4:41
4.	"Untale Untale"	Ramajogayya Sastry	Malavika	2:14
5.	"Addhira Banna"	Krishna Kanth	Anudeep Dev, Arun, Dhanunjay, Raghuram, Sampath, Prakash, Lokesh	2:03
6.	"Soggade Chinni Nayana"	Anantha Sreeram	Satya Yamini, Nutana Mohan, Vinayak	4:05
Total length:				21:37

Tamil Track-List
No.	Title	Singer(s)	Length
1.	"Oru Paravai Koottin Ulle"	Suchith Suresan, Vinaitha	4:41
2.	"Nee Vaanam Naan Kaattru"	Suchith Suresan, Vinitha	4:06
3.	"Kallu Koncham Ullappona"	Mukesh Mohamed, Priya Hemesh	4:20
4.	"Athiradiyaa Saravediyaa"	Ramu	0:54
5.	"Sivasiva Sampo"	Ramu	2:22
6.	"Pogathe Pogathe"	Vinaitha	2:13
Total length:			19:51

=== Reception ===
According to Karthik Srinivasan of The Hindu, the hook of "Dikka Dikka Dum Dum" resembles one written by A. R. Rahman for the Tamil song "Kaatre En Vasal" from Rhythm (2000): "Thulli varum kaatre, thulli varun kaatre, thaaimozhi pesu". Srinivasan called its melody "heady, raucous and very rhythmic". Sangeetha Devi Dundoo from The Hindu wrote that Rubens' music complemented the film's rural backdrop. Sify called Rubens' music one of the film's biggest strengths, which "perfectly gelled with the rustic storyline".

== Release and reception ==
Soggade Chinni Nayana was released worldwide on 15 January 2016 in 800-900 screens. Three other Telugu films (Nannaku Prematho, Express Raja and Dictator) were released at the same time, which affected its distribution. Nagarjuna defended his release decision, saying that the film's rural backdrop made it suitable for the Makar Sankranti season (a harvest festival). He added, "I announced the date two and a half months ago and blocked the theatres. There’s nothing I can do now". Global Cinema acquired the film's theatrical rights for the Nizam region. (Note: For film-industry purposes, the Nizam region includes the three districts of Kalaburagi, Bidar, and Raichur in Karnataka and seven districts in the Marathwada region (Aurangabad, Latur, Nanded, Parbhani, Beed, Jalna and Osmanabad) apart from the state of Telangana.)

=== Critical reception ===
Suresh Kavirayani of Deccan Chronicle gave Soggade Chinni Nayana four out of five stars, praising Kurasala's narrative clarity and calling it "wonderful overall" for its consistent tempo. Sangeetha Devi Dundoo, in The Hindu, gave the film 3.5 stars out of five and said it was set in a "familiar, comfort zone" which "guarantees a lot of fun". Dundoo found the temple-and-snake subplot engaging. Pranita Jonnalagedda of The Times of India also gave the film 3.5 stars out of five, calling it "so uncomplicated, unfussy and unpretentious" that viewers "get hooked to its simplicity".

Sify gave Soggade Chinni Nayana three stars out of five, comparing the film to Nageswara Rao's 1978 film Sri Rama Raksha. The reviewer praised Nagarjuna's performance and Kurasala's narrative clarity. L. Ravichander of The Hans India gave it a negative review, calling it an obsolete film with crass humor. Ravichander called Ramya's performance the "lone bright spot ... all grace, charm and vigour."

=== Box office ===
Soggade Chinni Nayana had an average 70-percent theatre occupancy rate and grossed ₹55 million (with a distributor share of ₹39 million) at the AP-Nizam box office on its first day. In three days, the film grossed ₹130 million and collected a distributor share of ₹85 million at the AP-Nizam box office. The three-day global gross passed ₹200 million, with a distributor share of ₹141 million. According to trade analyst Taran Adarsh, Soggade Chinni Nayana grossed US$535,183 (₹362 million) at the United States box office in its first weekend and was Nagarjuna's second-highest-grossing film in India (after Manam). In five days, the film grossed $629,303 (₹42.9 million) at the U.S. box office after a significant decline. In its first week, Soggade Chinni Nayana grossed ₹347.4 million globally. With a distributor share of ₹228.3 million, it became profitable.

After losing 30 screens to Airlift, Soggade Chinni Nayana grossed $776,940 (₹52.7 million) in ten days at the U.S. box office. By the end of its second week, the film grossed ₹559.6 million globally and had a distributor share of ₹357.3 million. In its third week, after losing many screens due to new releases, the film retained 19 screens in the U.S. and grossed $827,918 (₹53.2 million) in 17 days. With a distributor share of ₹38 million on an investment of ₹6.5 million, Soggade Chinni Nayana became Nagarjuna's highest-grossing film in India. In 20 days, the film grossed ₹638.8 million globally and collected a distributor share of ₹404.8 million; it became one of the few Telugu films to cross the 40-crore (₹400 million) mark.

Soggade Chinni Nayana retained seven screens in its fourth week in the U.S., grossing $837,089 (₹56.9 million) in 24 days. The film completed a 50-day-run in more than 75 theatres on 4 March 2016, a record for a Nagarjuna film. The global gross and distributor-share figures stood at ₹700 million and ₹440 million, respectively. It was estimated to have grossed over ₹750 million globally in its theatrical run.

== Remakes and dubbed versions ==
The film was remade in Kannada as Upendra Matte Baa (2017). The Tamil dubbed version, Sokkali Mainar was released on 14 July 2017. The film was dubbed in Hindi as The Return Of Raju.

== Sequel ==
Due to Bangarraju's popularity, Nagarjuna announced the film's sequel with Kurasala returning as director. The film is titled as Bangarraju and it has Nagarjuna reprising his roles as Bangarraju and Ramu and Ramya Krishna as Satyabhama alongside a new cast including Naga Chaitanya as Bangarraju's grandson, Chinna Bangarraju, and Krithi Shetty. However, its production was postponed due to several reasons and the pre-production works of the sequel was completed in November 2020 and filming was completed in December 2021. The film was released on 14 January 2022 coinciding with Sankranti.

== Awards and nominations ==
Date of ceremony	Award	Category	Recipient(s) and nominee(s)	Result	Ref.
28 & 29 March 2017	IIFA Utsavam	Best Lyricist – Telugu	Ramajogayya Sastry	Nominated	
28 & 29 March 2017	IIFA Utsavam	Best Female Playback Singer – Telugu	Shreya Ghoshal	Nominated	
9 April 2017	TSR – TV9 National Film Awards	Best Actor	Nagarjuna	Won	
April 2017	Sakshi Excellence Awards	Best female playback singer in -Telugu Most Popular Actor Of The Year - Female	Malavika Lavanya tripati	Won	
17 June 2017	Filmfare Awards South	Best Actress – Telugu	Malavika Lavanya tripati	Nominated	
17 June 2017	Filmfare Awards South	Best Supporting Actress – Telugu	Ramya Krishnan	Nominated	
30 June & 1 July 2017	South Indian International Movie Awards	Best Supporting Actress (Telugu)	Ramya Krishnan	Nominated	
30 June & 1 July 2017	South Indian International Movie Awards	Best Debut Director (Telugu)	Kalyan Krishna	Nominated	
14 November 2017	Nandi Awards	Best First Film of a Director	Kalyan Krishna	Won	
14 November 2017	Nandi Awards	Best Special Effects	Sanath (Fire Fly Digital)	Won	
January 2018	Zee Cine Awards Telugu	Girl Next Door of the Year	Lavanya Tripathi	Won	
