= Ramayya Vasthavayya =

2013 Indian film by Harish Shankar

- Theatrical release poster
- Directed by: Harish Shankar
- Screenplay by: Satish Vegesna; Ramesh Reddy
- Story by: Harish Shankar
- Produced by: Dil Raju
- Starring: N. T. Rama Rao Jr. Shruti Haasan; Samantha Ruth Prabhu
- Cinematography: Chota K. Naidu
- Edited by: Gautham Raju
- Music by: S. Thaman
- Production company: Sri Venkateswara Creations
- Release date: 11 October 2013
- Running time: 159 minutes
- Country: India
- Language: Telugu
- Budget: ₹40 crore
- Box office: ₹30.9 crore distributors' share

Ramayya Vasthavayya (transl. Rama, you will come) is a 2013 Indian Telugu-language action comedy drama film written and directed by Harish Shankar. It was produced by Dil Raju and stars N. T. Rama Rao Jr., Shruti Haasan and Samantha. Nandu, a cheerful student, falls for Akarsha but harbours a hidden mission linked to his past and a powerful enemy.

The soundtrack was composed by S. Thaman while the cinematography was handled by Chota K. Naidu. The film released worldwide on 11 October 2013 to mixed reviews. The film was commercially unsuccessful.

== Plot ==
The film starts with Musallapadu Nagabhushanam (Mukesh Rishi) arranging his daughter's marriage, where two men (Ajay and Bharani) try to kill him. He manages to escape.

The film shifts to Hyderabad, where Nandu (N. T. Rama Rao Jr.), a jovial student, lives with his parents (Tanikella Bharani and Pragathi). He falls for Akarsha (Samantha Ruth Prabhu) and tries to get close to her through his neighbour Asha Jyothi (Vidyullekha Raman) by blackmailing her. As his plan fails, he gets closer to Akarsha's grandmother Baby Shalini (Rohini Hattangadi). Akarsha slowly starts to fall for him. Four of them leave for Akarsha's sister's marriage, who is revealed to be Nagabhushanam's daughter. At the wedding, Nagabhushanam is attacked. To save himself, Nagabhushanam asks Nandu for help. Eventually, Nandu kills him, asking him to remember a mysterious girl, Ammulu, at Adityapuram.After the murder, Nandu makes sure that no clues are left at the spot. The investigating officer Avinash (Rao Ramesh) finds that Nandu is behind the murders. When Avinash tries to arrest Nandu, he kidnaps Akarsha at gunpoint and escapes. When she asks him why he murdered her father, he reveals his past.

Past: Nandu's real name is Ramu, who fell in love with Ammulu (Shruti Haasan), a resident of Adityapuram village. Nandu's parents were actually Ammulu's parents. Both their families approve of their marriage. Meanwhile, Nagabhushanam, along with Home Minister Umapathi (Kota Srinivasa Rao) and his son Bhikshapathi (P. Ravi Shankar), plans to grab a very fertile land. Bhikshapathi is a womanizer and lusts over Ammulu during their confrontation. When he misbehaves with her, Ramu attacks him. Later, Ammulu and Ramu's marriage is fixed by her parents and Ramu's grandfather Raja Rao Bahadur Ramchandra Naidu (Nagineedu). During preparations, Nagabhushanam's son Vicky (Bharath Raju) and some goons attack Ammulu. Nagabhushanam's son kills Ammulu, and Ramu loses her and his loved ones. Ramu then kills Vicky in retaliation. He moves to Hyderabad along with Ammulu's parents and changes his name to Nandu.

Present: Ramu later leaves her safely at her home through his friends. Ramu and his brothers killed Nagabhushanam to lure Bhikshapathi out of hiding. To seek revenge, through a girl (Hamsa Nandini), Ramu plans to invite Bhikshapathi to a youth fest as the chief guest. Bhikshapathi lusts after her and agrees to attend. There, he sees Ramu and plans to attack him with his henchmen, but he escapes. Later, he informs Bhikshapathi that he kidnapped Umapathi and challenges him to face him at Adityapuram. Ramu reminds Bhikshapathi about Ammulu's death and kills him with a plough. Umapathi does not bear to see this and dies from a heart attack. The film ends with Nandu starting a trust in his mother's name in the village, and Akarsha teaching the children there.

== Cast ==
- N. T. Rama Rao Jr. as Nandu / Ramu
- Shruti Haasan as Ammulu
- Samantha Ruth Prabhu as Akarsha
- P. Ravi Shankar as Bhikshapathi
- Mukesh Rishi as Mosallapadu Nagabhushanam
- Kota Srinivasa Rao as Umapathi, Bhikshapathi's father
- Rohini Hattangadi as Baby Shalini
- Rao Ramesh as CBI Officer Avinash
- Tanikella Bharani as Ammullu's father
- Pragathi as Ammullu's mother
- Nagineedu as Raja Rao Bahadur Ramchandra Naidu, Nandu's grandfather
- Jayasudha as Annapurnamma, Ramu's mother (only appears in portraits used on set)
- Ajay as Ramu's elder brother
- Bharani as Ramu's second elder brother
- Vidyullekha Raman as Asha Jyothi, Akarsha's friend
- Pranita as Akarsha's friend
- Praveen as Nandu's friend
- Pradeep Machiraju as Ajay, Nandu's friend
- Satya as Nandu's friend
- Bharath Raju as Nagabhushanam's henchman
- Hamsa Nandini (special appearance)

== Production ==
=== Development ===
Harish Shankar announced his project with N. T. Rama Rao Jr. which was said to be produced by politician Kodali Nani. Due to political differences between them, Dil Raju replaced Kodali Nani as the film's producer on Sri Venkateswara Creations banner. The movie was officially announced by Harish Shankar in July 2012 and revealed that the project would start once N. T. Rama Rao Jr. completes his part for Baadshah. The titles MLA: Manchi Lakshanalu unna Abbai and Jana Gana Mana were speculated as the film's titles which were later ruled out by Dil Raju and said that the movie does not have a title yet. On 18 October 2012 the film's muhurtham and pooja ceremony were held in Dil Raju's office in Hyderabad. Chota K. Naidu and S. Thaman were announced as the cinematographer and music director respectively. Ramesh Reddy and Sathish Vegnesha provided the screenplay while Gautham Raju was selected as the editor.

=== Casting ===
Harish Shankar announced that there would be two female leads in the film and Tamannaah was rumored as one of them. Later Samantha was selected as the main female lead. Meanwhile, it was known that N. T. Rama Rao Jr. would be seen as a college student. Shruti Hassan was selected as the second female lead. Harish planned no combination scenes for both the female leads in this film and forgone his extra remuneration for casting both of them. She later confirmed it to be a special character with less length adding that it was a cameo appearance. P. Ravishankar was selected to play the role of main villain recognizing his fantastic performance in negative roles in Kannada movies. Vidyullekha Raman was selected to play the role of N. T. Rama Rao Jr.'s friend which was said to be a crucial one. Hamsa Nandini was selected for an item number in the film.

=== Filming ===
Principal photography began on 4 January 2013 in Hyderabad. The first schedule lasted for 9 days and ended on 13 January 2013. Shruti Haasan started working on this movie on 26 March 2013 and many vital scenes on herself and N. T. Rama Rao Jr. were shot. In late June, Samantha rejoined the film's sets in Hyderabad after returning from Europe. The film shoot had a night schedule where the scenes were canned till 5:30 AM. Few wedding scenes were shot at Sierra Garden and Friendly Line areas of Ramoji Film City. A song was shot at Annapurna Studios on N. T. Rama Rao Jr. The climax was shot in August 2013 at Hyderabad and 1000 Junior Artists joined the scene. 1 day talkie shoot and 3 songs were left to be shot. Out of 3, 2 songs were planned to shoot in Spain. A song on Hamsa Nandini and N. T. Rama Rao Jr. was shot at Annapoorna Studios on whose completion the filming ended.

== Release ==
The film was planned for a release on 27 September 2013 to coincide with the 12th anniversary of N. T. Rama Rao Jr.'s first blockbuster Student No.1. It was postponed to 11 October 2013 due to political disturbances prevailing in the state. The film was awarded an 'A' certificate by Central Board of Film Certification due to some heavy action sequences without any cuts and 1200 screens were locked globally. Lorgan Entertainment distributed the film in Australia. My3 Movies distributed the film in USA. A malayalam dubbed version named Sarvadhipan was released later.

=== Marketing ===
The film's first look poster was unveiled on 20 April 2013 which also confirmed the film's title. The film's teaser was unveiled on 20 May 2013 to coincide with N. T. Rama Rao Jr.'s birthday. A video teaser of the song "Jabilli Nuvve Cheppamma" was released on 30 August 2014 which became an instant hit receiving 1.2 million views and about 10,000 likes in five days of its release in YouTube. On 17 September 2013 Harish Shankar posted the making video of the song "Neneppudaina Anukunnana" on YouTube and spoke about its filming. The film's theatrical trailer was released on 21 September 2013.

=== Home media ===
Aditya Videos released the DVD and Blu-ray of the film in India and an online version was uploaded by them in YouTube on 20 February 2014. The film's satellite rights were acquired by Zee Telugu for an undisclosed price. The film's worldwide television premiere happened on 16 March 2014. The film's overseas DVD was released in NTSC format on 21 March 2014 by Bhavani Videos while the Blu-ray Disc released two days later. The film's official online release in YouTube received a tremendous response. It received 1.2 million views in two days and increased day by day, becoming highly successful online.

== Reception ==
The Times of India wrote "The film is packaged entirely around its hero with NTR looking uber cool and as stylish as ever. He got into the skin of the character and has delivered a fantastic performance to shoulder the film. All in all, Ramayya Vasthavayya's first half is a fun-ride as you see NTR in his elements. However, the second half could be a disappointment." The Hindu wrote "Until a few minutes before the interval, you’re left looking beneath the surface of the comedy, songs and romance to see what the film is trying to communicate to you. And post interval, when the film takes you into a rural hamlet and recalls an ill-fated past followed by revenge, there’s way too much bloodshed that leaves you numb. Watch this film if you are an NTR fan." Sify wrote "Can watch it for its first half and for NTR. Other than that, the movie is just another routine revenge drama that fails to impress" and rated it 2.75/5. IANS called the film "a hero-worshipping, fan-appealing film that gets almost everything in the book of filmmaking wrong" in its review.

== Box office ==
Ramayya Vasthavayya opened to packed houses with 90% to 100% occupancy in single screens and multiplexes. The film grossed approximately ₹3.7 million (US$40,000) in Nizam, ₹18.8 million (US$200,000) in Ceded, ₹4.6 million (US$49,000) in Nellore, ₹12.8 million (US$140,000) in Guntur, ₹5.6 million (US$60,000) in Krishna, ₹7.3 million (US$78,000) in West, ₹7.5 million (US$80,000) in East, ₹6.4 million (US$68,000) in Uttarandhra, ₹13.5 million (US$140,000) in Karnataka, ₹5.5 million (US$59,000) from rest of India and ₹25 million (US$270,000) in Overseas on its first day taking its global first day total to ₹130.7 million (US$1.4 million). The film stood in the third spot in the list of Telugu cinema with the highest first-day share in Andhra Pradesh with Attarintiki Daredi and Baadshah standing in the first two spots. However the film's collections dropped significantly on its second day except in Guntur, Nellore, Ceded and Karnataka regions while a lukewarm response was observed at the USA box office.

After collecting ₹2.76 million (US$29,000) on its second day, it showed improvement in its third day by collecting ₹40 million (US$430,000) taking its three-day AP share to ₹155.4 million (US$1.7 million) and ₹245 million (US$2.6 million) in four days due to Dusherra holiday. In its first week the film collected a worldwide share of ₹286 million (US$3.1 million) but failed to surpass Attarintiki Daredi which collected a worldwide share of ₹492.4 million (US$5.3 million) in its first week. Trade experts opined that the film's business would be closed soon due to the successful run of Attarintiki Daredi. In its full run, the film collected a worldwide share of ₹309 million (US$3.3 million) and performed poorly at the box office. It earned ₹242.3 million (US$2.6 million) in Andhra Pradesh and also became the second biggest earner for N. T. Rama Rao Jr. in Nizam and Karnataka areas, where it fetched ₹89 million (US$950,000) and ₹38.2 million (US$410,000), respectively.
