= Bangarraju =

2022 film by Kalyan Krishna Kurasala

- Theatrical release poster
- Directed by: Kalyan Krishna
- Screenplay by: Satyanand
- Story by: Kalyan Krishna
- Produced by: Nagarjuna
- Starring: Nagarjuna; Naga Chaitanya; Ramya Krishna; Krithi Shetty
- Cinematography: J. Yuvaraj
- Edited by: Vijay Vardhan Kavuri
- Music by: Anup Rubens
- Production companies: Annapurna Studios; Zee Studios
- Release date: 14 January 2022
- Running time: 160 minutes
- Country: India
- Language: Telugu
- Budget: ₹25 crore
- Box office: ₹66 crore

Bangarraju is a 2022 Indian Telugu-language action comedy film directed by Kalyan Krishna. Produced by Annapurna Studios and Zee Studios, Bangarraju is a sequel to the 2016 film Soggade Chinni Nayana and stars Nagarjuna and Naga Chaitanya in the titular roles with Ramya Krishna, and Krithi Shetty in female leads.

Bangarraju was filmed from August to December 2021, with film score and soundtrack composed by Anup Rubens. Bangarraju was released theatrically on 14 January 2022, coinciding with Sankranti. It received mixed to positive reviews from critics and was commercially successful, grossing over ₹66 crore worldwide.

== Plot ==
When Bangarraju returns to Yamlok, (Note: Following the events of Soggade Chinni Nayana (2016).) he is told that he has been shifted to Swarga due to the good deeds that he has done during his time back on earth. After a few months, Ramu and Seetha both have a child, but Seetha dies after bearing the child. Sathyabhama and Ramu decide to take care of the child and name him Bangarraju. Ramu's cousin Ramesh names his daughter Naga Lakshmi, and they decide that they will get them both married in the future.

Due to Ramu's busy work schedule, he decides to leave his child in the care of Ramu's mother, Satyabhama. Growing up, Bangarraju shares many of the same qualities as his paternal grandfather while also having conflicts with Naga Lakshmi. In one such instance where Bangarraju is found with a girl, Satyabhama sees this and dies of a heart attack. She then finds the elder Bangarraju's soul in Swarga flirting with the apsaras, and Bangarraju Senior is shocked to see her die this early.

They then see their grandson Bangarraju has grown up to become the same man that his grandfather was, and at the same time Naga Lakshmi is trying to become the village Sarpanch after her father. With Bangarraju and Naga Lakshmi constantly bickering, both Bangarraju Senior and Satyabhama ask permission from Yamraj and Devraj Indra to go back to earth to solve their problems and get the youngsters married. Meanwhile, Ramesh encounters a problem with the lands of a friend and Bangarraju helps him and fights off ruthless henchmen. The henchmen come back and try to kill Bangarraju during Ramesh's yagna in the temple. Naga Lakshmi slaps Bangarraju for ruining her father's yagna. It is then revealed that Bangarraju's cousin Aadi has been planning to get Bangarraju killed because they know that Bangarraju's family has been protecting a temple that has rare gemstones at the bottom of it and to get the stones, they need to kill the family.

Meanwhile, Bangarraju Sr. tries to get Naga Lakshmi to like Bangarraju, which she does. In a turn of events, it is revealed that Aadi's father Sampath is still alive and that he has been also seeking vengeance against the family for killing his father and grandfather. At the same time, Bangarraju Sr. successfully gets Bangarraju and Naga Lakshmi to love each other. Sampath, on the other hand, knows that Bangarraju's soul is the one that killed his father and grandfather and that the soul is back now and tells Aadi about it. With this, Sampath plans to get a ring that will be placed on Bangarraju's hand during his engagement which will stop Bangarraju soul from entering his body. It is then found out that Ramesh has been in on this plan all along, and that he also wants Bangarraju to be killed for the stones and to marry his daughter to Aadi.

Bangarraju Sr. and Satyabhama try various ways to stop Bangarraju from being killed, but he ultimately ends up being kidnapped by Aadi and is brought to Sampath and Ramesh to be killed. When Bangarraju is on the verge of being killed, the divine snake from the earlier film falls on Ramu's car, and Bangarraju, sensing this, jumps into Ramu's body to fight Sampath, Ramesh, and Aadi. Bangarraju regains consciousness, and the ring is removed from his finger, allowing Bangarraju to also enter his body. After both Bangarraju and Ramu kill Sampath and Aadi, they plan to kill Ramesh also but stop due to them seeing Naga Lakshmi, and they decide not to tell her the truth. Bangarraju and Naga Lakshmi both get married, and at a pooja alter, Yamraj and Devraj Indra impose a barrier that allows Bangarraju and Ramu to see and touch Bangarraju Sr. and Satyabhama. Bangarraju sees Satyabhama and talks about how he lived with sadness after her death and he begs her not to leave him again.

Meanwhile, Ramu says that him seeing Bangarraju Sr. for the first time gives him a sense of braveness to which the senior Bangarraju replies that Ramu needs to be a better father to Bangarraju and that he should not neglect his son due to his profession. After an emotional union, both Bangarraju Sr. and Satyabhama's souls are then joined with Lord Shiva since their karma has been completed.

== Cast ==
- Nagarjuna in a dual roles of
  - Bangarraju Sr.
  - Ram "Ramu" Mohan
- Naga Chaitanya as Bangarraju Jr.
  - Aakash Srinivas as young Bangarraju Jr
- Ramya Krishna as Satyabhama
- Krithi Shetty as Naga Lakshmi (Voice dubbed by RJ Swetha)
- Sampath Raj as Sampath
- Rao Ramesh as Ramesh
- Govind Padmasoorya as Aadi (S/O Sampath)
- Brahmaji as Bangarraju's maternal uncle
- Vennela Kishore as Bangarraju's uncle
- Jhansi as Bangarraju's aunt
- Anitha Chowdhary as Bangarraju's aunt
- K. Naga Babu as Yamraj
- Ravi Prakash as Devraj Indra
- Duvvasi Mohan as Chitragupta
- Gundu Sudarshan as Narada
- Chalapathi Rao as Chalapathi, Satyabhama's brother
- Annapurna as Nagalakshmi's grandmother
- Rajshri Nair as Nagalakshmi's mother
- Rohini Reddy as Nagalakshmi's friend
- Surekha Vani as Sampath's wife
- Praveen as Rambabu
- Ranjith Velayudhan as Harish
- Naga Mahesh as Siddhanti
- Phanindra Gollapalli as School Teacher

Cameo appearances

- Meenakshi Dixit as Apsara
- Darshana Banik as Apsara
- Vedhika as Apsara
- Simrat Kaur in a cameo role
- Daksha Nagarkar in "Entha Sakkagundiro" song
- Faria Abdullah in "Vaasivaadi Tassadiyya" song

== Production ==
Following the success of Soggade Chinni Nayana in 2016 and the accompanying popularity of Bangarraju's character, Nagarjuna announced the film's sequel with Kurasala returning as the director. The sequel is titled Bangarraju after the original's protagonist with Nagarjuna reprising his role. Ramya Krishna also reprised her role as Satyabhama. Nagarjuna's son Naga Chaitanya is cast as Bangarraju's grandson Chinna Bangarraju. Krithi Shetty was paired opposite him as Naga Lakshmi. According to Kurasala, Bangarraju has a fresh storyline and stands on its own, despite it being a sequel. Kurasala planned to cast Nagarjuna's second son Akhil Akkineni in the film, but did not materialize due to scheduling conflicts.

Bangarraju's production was supposed to begin some time after Soggade Chinni Nayana but was postponed due to several reasons. Kurasala completed its pre-production works in November 2020 and began casting for the film. In March 2021, during a press meet of Wild Dog, Nagarjuna announced his intentions to release Bangarraju in January 2022, aiming for a Sankranti release.

The film was launched with a formal puja ceremony in Hyderabad on 20 August 2021. Anup Rubens, who composed the music for Soggade Chinni Nayana, returns for Bangarraju. Annapurna Studios and Zee Studios have collaborated to jointly produce the project with Nagarjuna as its producer. Principal photography of the film began on 25 August. Shooting took place at the Ramoji Film City. The production then shifted to Mysore where a week-long schedule took place. Filming wrapped up on 23 December 2021. It was scheduled to release on 14 January 2022 coinciding with Sankranti.

== Music ==
Bangarraju

Soundtrack album by Anup Rubens
- Released: 29 January 2022
- Genre: Feature film soundtrack
- Length: 20:13
- Language: Telugu
- Label: Zee Music
- Producer: Anup Rubens

Anup Rubens chronology
Drushyam 2 (2021)	Bangarraju (2022)	Malli Modalaindi (2022)

Singles from Bangarraju
- 1. "Laddunda" Released: 9 November 2021; 2. "Naa Kosam" Released: 5 December 2021; 3. "Vaasivaadi Tassadiyya" Released: 19 December 2021; 4. "Bangaara" Released: 8 January 2022; 5. "Entha Sakkagundhiro" Released: 14 January 2022

The film score and soundtrack album of the film is composed by Anup Rubens. The music rights were acquired by Zee Music.

No.	Title	Lyrics	Singer(s)	Length
1.	"Nuvvu Siggupadithe"	Kasarla Shyam	K. S. Chithra, Sai Charan, Ramya Behara	3:56
2.	"Vaasivaadi Tassadiyya"	Kalyan Krishna	Mohana Bhogaraju, Shahiti Chaganti, Harshavardhan Chavali	3:52
3.	"Naa Kosam"	Balaji	Sid Sriram	4:17
4.	"Entha Sakkagundhiro"	Balaji	Sai Madhav, Mohana Bhogaraju, Meghna Mishra, Kavya, Aparna	2:53
5.	"Bangaara"	Bhaskarabhatla	Madhu Priya	2:46
6.	"Laddunda"	Bhaskarabhatla	Akkineni Nagarjuna, Dhanunjay Seepana, Anup Rubens, Nutana Mohan, Mohana Bhogaraju, Haripriya	2:28
Total length:				20:13

== Reception ==
=== Critical reception ===
Bangarraju received mixed reviews from critics. Writing for Cinema Express, Murali Krishna CH called it a "perfect follow-up for its predecessor, Soggade Chinni Nayana." "The film is peppered with hilarious one-liners, and Kalyan Krishna perfectly captures the portrait and vibe of a coastal village, complete with characters that are rooted in the setting," he added. Anji Shetty of Sakshi stated that Nagarjuna and Chaitanya's performance is the core strength of the film with a particular praise for the climax sequence.

The Times of India critic Neeshita Nyapati opined that Bangarraju was an "old wine in a new bottle," and had nothing fresh to offer. On the technical aspects, she wrote: "Anup Rubens' music is fun and fits well into the story. Cinematographer J. Yuvaraj also pulls off the visuals well. The weak VFX however is a let-down and doesn't let you immerse well into the story." Calling Bangarraju a "passable festive entertainer," Sangeetha Devi Dundoo of The Hindu felt that the sequel banked heavily on Nagarjuna and Chaitanya but barely skimmed the surface of the supernatural revenge family drama story. The Indian Express' critic Manoj Kumar R criticized the film and pointed out over-sexualisation, unoriginality, lack of common sense and basic respect for logical thinking and honest storytelling as its problems.

=== Box office ===
Bangarraju was successful at the box office, grossing around ₹118.87 crore in three weeks of its run. On its opening day, Bangarraju grossed ₹15.35 crore worldwide, with a distributor's share of ₹9.36 crore. By the second day of the release, the film collected a total gross of ₹36 crore worldwide, with a distributor's share of ₹18.85 crore.

== Future ==
During a promotional event of the film in January 2022, Nagarjuna, answering a question posed by a journalist, asserted a possibility of a sequel to Bangarraju of Soggade Chinni Nayana 2016 movie.
