= Custody (2023 film) =

2023 Indian film by Venkat Prabhu

- Theatrical release poster
- Directed by: Venkat Prabhu
- Written by: Venkat Prabhu; Abburi Ravi (Telugu dialogues)
- Produced by: Srinivasaa Chituri
- Starring: Naga Chaitanya; Arvind Swamy; Krithi Shetty; R. Sarathkumar; Priyamani; Ramki
- Cinematography: S. R. Kathir
- Edited by: Venkat Raajen
- Music by: Songs: Yuvan Shankar Raja; Ilaiyaraaja; Score: Yuvan Shankar Raja
- Production companies: Srinivasaa Silver Screen; Anji Industeries
- Release date: 12 May 2023
- Running time: 148 minutes
- Country: India
- Languages: Telugu; Tamil
- Box office: est. ₹15.85–20 crore

Custody is a 2023 Indian period action thriller film directed by Venkat Prabhu and produced by Srinivasa Chitturi under Srinivasaa Silver Screen and Anji Industries. It was shot simultaneously in Telugu and Tamil languages. The film stars Naga Chaitanya (in his Tamil debut), Arvind Swamy, Krithi Shetty, Priyamani, R. Sarathkumar, Ramki and Sampath Raj. The music was composed by the father-son duo, Ilaiyaraaja and Yuvan Shankar Raja, while the cinematography and editing were handled by S. R. Kathir and Venkat Raajen. Custody was released on 12 May 2023 to mixed reviews from critics and became a box-office bomb.

== Plot ==
In 1998 in Andhra Pradesh, A. Shiva, a happy-go-lucky police constable, and his girlfriend Revathi, a driving instructor, decide to elope and get married. However, Shiva gets involved in a road rage incident and arrests Rajasekhar alias "Raju", a dreaded gangster carrying out dirty jobs for CM Dakshayani and her party. George, a CBI officer imprisoned in the case, informs Shiva that he has to produce Raju in a court in Bangalore within 48 hours as Raju has valuable information regarding Dakshayani's involvement in an orchestrated bomb blast at Morampudi. Shiva calls Varghese, George's superior, and confirms the same.

Meanwhile, Dakshayani learns of Raju's arrest and assigns some goons and IG Nataraj to kill him. Nataraj and Dakshyini's goons try to kill Raju and George, but Shiva subdues the goons and escapes with them. Shiva, Raju, and George head to Bangalore, with Revathi accompanying them. Nataraj tracks them down, where their car falls into a lake near a dam. Shiva, Raju, Revathi and George sneak into the dam's underground tunnel, where Nataraj attacks them and George is killed in the crossfire. After escaping from Nataraj, Shiva and the others head to a hospital as Raju was injured during the shootout, but the hospital is watched by Nataraj's men. Later, the trio arrive at Maj. Gen. Philips Satya Raj and Raju is treated and recovers.

Under Varghese's orders, Shiva and the others are escorted by officers, but Nataraj and his goons surround them. Shiva and Raju fight the men, and Philips also arrives and helps Shiva and the others escape. Due to unexpected circumstances, Raju escapes and reaches a fair, but Shiva manages to find him. Nataraj arrives and tells Shiva to kill Raju in exchange for his father's life. However, Shiva's father tells Shiva to leave and seek justice for his brother Vishnu, who also died in the Morampudi blast. Shiva's father shoots himself, and Shiva escapes again with Raju and Revathi. At the railway station, Raju's brother Ravi, whom Dakshayani bribed to kill him in exchange for Raju's place, attacks the trio. Raju kills Ravi during a fight and along with Shiva and Revathi boards the train to Bangalore.

Nataraj and his men follow them; a fight ensues, and Raju separates from the compartment to save Shiva. Nataraj kills Raju, leaving Shiva devastated. The next day in court, it is revealed that Shiva recorded Raju's confession about Dakshayani's involvement in the Morampudi blast and presents the evidence in the court. Raju also confessed that Dakshayani had committed the blasts to cover up the murder of an IAS officer who was investigating her scandals. Dakshayani, Nataraj, and the other officers involved get arrested. Varghese thanks Shiva and offers him a position in the CBI, but Shiva declines and decides to continue working in the police force. Following this, Shiva and Revathi plan for their wedding.

== Cast ==
- Naga Chaitanya as Constable A. Shiva
- Arvind Swamy as Rajashekhar "Raju" alias "Raazu"
- R. Sarathkumar as IG Natraj IPS
- Krithi Shetty as Revathi
- Priyamani as Chief Minister Dhakshayani
- Ramki as Maj. Gen. Philips Sathya Raj
- Jayasudha as Judge
- Vennela Kishore as Prem (Telugu version)
- Premgi Amaren as Prem (Tamil version)
- Sampath Raj as CBI officer George
- Jayaprakash as CBI Investigative Head Varghese
- Surya as Mani
- Y. G. Mahendran as Party President
- Ravi Prakash as SI Rangappa
- Annapoorna as Julie
- Rajitha as Revathi's mother
- Premi Viswanath as Mangalam
- Kadambari Kiran as Pandu
- Goparaju Ramana as Dharmaraju
- Vadlamani Srinivas as Revathi's father

Cameo appearances

- Jiiva as SI Vishnu, Shiva's brother
- Anandhi as Malar, Vishnu's fiance
- Vaibhav as a singer in "Ammunni Rukkumanee" song
- Venkat Prabhu as himself

== Production ==
=== Development ===
In late January 2022, it was reported that Naga Chaitanya and Venkat Prabhu were going to collaborate for an official remake of the latter's directional film Maanaadu (2021), which was critically acclaimed and received praise for its concept. Suresh Productions, which reportedly purchased the remake rights, were reported to produce the film. Pooja Hegde was further reported to play the lead actress role. Prabhu, in an interview in late March, revealed that he is in discussion with Chaitanya and the actor liked the story that he had narrated. However, he did not reveal whether if it was a remake of Maanaadu or not.

On 6 April, the project was officially announced. It was revealed that Srinivasaa Chitturi would produce the film under Srinivasaa Silver Screen, while Pawan Kumar would present the film. It was tentatively titled as NC 22. Prabhu revealed that the film would be shot in Telugu and Tamil, marking the film as his directorial debut in Telugu cinema and Chaitanya's acting debut in Tamil cinema. On 23 June, Ilaiyaraaja and Yuvan Shankar Raja were announced to jointly compose the score for the film. Krithi Shetty was also announced playing the lead actress role, marking it as her Tamil cinema acting debut, as in her last bilingual film The Warriorr (2022) were her portions were only shot in Telugu. A muhuratam was held on 20 September at a studio in Hyderabad with the presence of the film's cast and crew.

Three days later, cinematographer S. R. Kathir, dialogue writer Abburi Ravi, editor Venkat Raajen, production designer Rajeevan, art director Ry Sathyaramayana and action directors Yannick Ben and Mahesh Mathew were announced being a part of the film. In early October, Jiiva was reported to play an important role in the film. On 14 October, it was announced that Sampath Raj, Priyamani, R. Sarathkumar, Premi Viswanath (in her Telugu cinema acting debut), Vennela Kishore (Telugu version) and Prabhu's brother Premgi Amaren (Tamil version) were a part of the cast. On 23 November, on the occasion of Chaitanya's birthday, the title Custody was revealed.

=== Filming ===
Principal photography began on 21 September 2022, with the first schedule at a erected set in Ramoji Film City. Filming took also place in at set in Melukote. However, the set became vandalized as the villagers there were unhappy of them filming there. It was reported that it was because the set was a bar, which made the villagers unhappy as it is a historic temple right beside. It was also reported that it was because that the filming continued longer than permission given, which was two days. Filming later took place in Mysore, before concluding the schedule by 21 October.

The second schedule was scheduled to commence on 11 November, but commenced on 15 November. The filming in the schedule took place at a set in Hyderabad. The schedule reportedly featured an action sequence, and was reported to be a long schedule. The schedule featured a song sequence, choreographed by Shekar Master, which had seven sets erected in Annapurna Studios. The filming wrapped by 24 February 2023.

=== Post-production ===
Chaitanya began dubbing his portions in early March 2023. The background score composing began in mid April in Dubai. The film was sent for censor by 8 May and received a U/A certificate on 10 May.

== Music ==
Custody

Soundtrack album by Ilaiyaraaja and Yuvan Shankar Raja
- Released: 16 May 2023
- Recorded: 2022–2023
- Studios: U1 Records, Chennai
- Genre: Film soundtrack
- Length: 15:04
- Languages: Telugu; Tamil
- Label: Times Music
- Producers: Ilaiyaraaja; Yuvan Shankar Raja

Ilaiyaraaja chronology
Tamilarasan (2023)	Custody (2023)	Music School (2023)

Yuvan Shankar Raja chronology
Love Today (2022)	Custody (2023)	Paramporul (2023)

The music was jointly composed by Ilaiyaraaja and Yuvan Shankar Raja, while the latter composed the background score. The film marks as the latter's ninth collaboration with Prabhu. The audio rights were acquired by Times Music.

The first single "Head Up High" was released on 10 April 2023, the second single "Timeless Love" on 23 April, the third single "Ammo Nee Rukkumini" in Telugu and "Ammani Rukkumani" in Tamil on 17 May, the fourth single "Anna Thammulante" in Telugu and "Ettu Thesa" in Tamil on 24 May.

Track listing (Telugu)
No.	Title	Lyrics	Music	Singer(s)	Length
1.	"Head Up High"	Ramajogayya Sastry, Shri Shivani V.P.	Yuvan Shankar Raja	Arun Kaundinya, Asal Kolaar	4:27
2.	"Timeless Love"	Ramajogayya Sastry	Ilaiyaraaja	Kapil Kapilan	4:20
3.	"Ammo Nee Rukkumini"	Ramajogayya Sastry	Ilaiyaraaja	Premgi Amaren, Manasi Mahadevan	3:27
4.	"Anna Thammulante"	Ramajogayya Sastry	Ilaiyaraaja	Vijay Yesudas	3:58

Track listing (Tamil)
No.	Title	Lyrics	Music	Singer(s)	Length
1.	"Head Up High"	Karunakaran, Sri Shivani V. P.	Yuvan Shankar Raja	Asal Kolaar, Arun Kaundinya	4:27
2.	"Timeless Love"	Madhan Karky	Ilaiyaraaja	Kapil Kapilan	4:20
3.	"Ammani Rukkumani"	Muthamil	Ilaiyaraaja	Premgi Amaren, Manasi Mahadevan	3:28
4.	"Ettu Thesa"	Gangai Amaran	Ilaiyaraaja	Vijay Yesudas	3:52

== Release ==
=== Theatrical ===
Custody released theatrically on 12 May 2023. It released in Telugu and Tamil language.

=== Home media ===
Custody was available for streaming from 9 June 2023 on Amazon Prime Video in Telugu, Tamil languages and dubbed versions in Malayalam and Kannada languages.

== Reception ==
=== Critical response ===
Custody received mixed reviews from critics, with praise towards the cast performances, cinematography, action sequences, and plot, but criticism towards the length and predictability.

Neeshita Nyayapati of The Times of India gave 3/5 stars and wrote "Custody has the kind of story that's predictable and some of the characters could've been fully realised to make this experience better than what it is".

Kirubhakar Purushothaman of The Indian Express rated the film 2.5/5 stars and wrote "Venkat Prabhu directorial Custody doesn't decide what type of movie it wants to be till the very last scene of the film." Latha Srinivasan of India Today gave 2.5/5 stars and wrote "Custody is predictable but if the Shiva-Raju relationship/ story had been completely unlocked, it would have made for terrific viewing."

Balakrishna Ganeshan of The News Minute gave 2.5/5 stars and wrote "For some reason the period of the film is set in 1998. The twist too feels as old as the decade in which the movie is taking place." Manoj Kumar of OTTplay gave 2/5 stars and wrote "Venkat Prabhu, who previously showcased his inventiveness with Maanaadu, disappoints with Custody."

Sangeetha Devi Dundoo of The Hindu wrote "Director Venkat Prabhu's Telugu-Tamil bilingual Custody is not among his best, but has plenty going for it." Haricharan Pudipeddi of Hindustan Times wrote "Naga Chaitanya's latest film is one of those action dramas that never realise their potential and get lost midway."
