= Sampath Raj =

Indian actor (born 1968)

- Born: 25 December 1968 (age 57); Warangal
- Other name: Sampath Kumar
- Occupation: Actor
- Years active: 2003–present

Sampath Raj (born 25 December 1968) is an Indian actor who works predominantly in Tamil and Telugu films, in addition to Kannada and Malayalam films.

He is best known for his appearances in director Venkat Prabhu's trilogy, which includes Chennai 600028, Saroja, and Goa. In addition to these films, he has played supporting roles in various other projects, often portraying negative characters. He won the Nandi Award for Best Villain for his performance in Mirchi (2013). After a sabbatical, he returned to Kannada cinema with Shourya (2010).

== Early life and career ==
Sampath was born in Lucknow, Uttar Pradesh and spent his childhood in various places like Punjab, Bengaluru, and Delhi. His father was a military doctor from Nellore, while his mother hails from Srirangam. Sampath who had interest in acting joined theatre and appeared in various stage plays. He started his career in Kannada cinema with Preethi Prema Pranaya (2003) and Bimba (2004). He made his debut in Tamil with Neranja Manasu (2004) portraying a negative role.

== Filmography ==
=== Films ===
Key
†	Denotes films that have not yet been released

Year	Title	Role	Language	Notes
2003	Preethi Prema Pranaya	Prasad	Kannada	
2004	Bimba	Arvind	Kannada	Credited as Sampath Kumar
2004	Neranja Manasu	Sivanandi	Tamil	
2006	Thirupathi	Dr. Varadhan	Tamil	
2006	Perarasu	ACP Chidambaranathan	Tamil	
2006	Azhagiya Asura	Mohan	Tamil	
2006	Bharati		Telugu	
2007	Thaamirabharani	Kaarmegam	Tamil	
2007	Pori	Nama Shivayam	Tamil	
2007	Paruthiveeran	Marudhu	Tamil	
2007	Chennai 600028	Guna	Tamil	
2008	Pidichirukku	Mariadas	Tamil	
2008	Bheemaa	Periyavar's son	Tamil	
2008	Thotta	Murugavel	Tamil	
2008	Velli Thirai	Mythili's brother	Tamil	
2008	Arai En 305-il Kadavul	Raana	Tamil	
2008	Saroja	A. Sampath Kumar	Tamil	Nominated: Filmfare Award for Best Supporting Actor – Tamil; Nominated: Vijay Award for Best Villain
2008	Kadhalil Vizhunthen	Anbu Chelvan	Tamil	
2008	Seval	Periyavar	Tamil	
2009	Sagar Alias Jacky Reloaded	Rosario	Malayalam	
2009	Mariyadhai	Sampath	Tamil	
2009	Yavarum Nalam	Ramachandran	Tamil	
2009	13B	Ram Charan	Hindi	
2009	Vaamanan	Anbu	Tamil	
2009	Ainthaam Padai	Periyasamy	Tamil	
2009	Kandhakottai	Singam Perumal	Tamil	
2010	Porkkalam	Dhronam Raju	Tamil	
2010	Goa	Daniel	Tamil	Credited as Sampath Kumar; Nominated: Vijay Award for Best Supporting Actor
2010	Aasal	Sam	Tamil	
2010	Neeyum Naanum	Sampath	Tamil	
2010	Kanagavel Kaaka	Thirunavukkarasu	Tamil	
2010	Kattradhu Kalavu	Ramanathan	Tamil	
2010	Anwar	Basheer	Malayalam	
2010	Magizhchi	Sevatha Perumal	Tamil	
2010	The Thriller	Martin Dinakar	Malayalam	
2010	Shourya	Vijayendra Varma	Kannada	
2010	Jackie	CID Officer	Kannada	
2011	Bhavani	Surya	Tamil	
2011	Aanmai Thavarael	Charles Antony	Tamil	
2011	Eththan	Assistant Commissioner of Police	Tamil	Guest appearance
2011	Aaranya Kaandam	Pasupathy	Tamil	Norway Tamil Film Festival Award for Best Villain
2011	Yuvan Yuvathi	Sevatha Perumal	Tamil	
2011	Varnam	Durai	Tamil	
2011	Panjaa	Sampath	Telugu	
2012	Dammu	Chandravanshi King's elder son	Telugu	
2012	Aarohanam	Dr. Bala Krishnan	Tamil	
2012	Drama	D'Souza	Kannada	
2013	Samar	Muthumaran	Tamil	
2013	Mirchi	Uma	Telugu	Nandi Award for Best Villain; SIIMA Award for Best Villain
2013	Kili Poyi	Rana	Malayalam	
2013	Vatthikuchi	Benny	Tamil	
2013	Om 3D	Bhavani	Telugu	
2013	Brindavana	Bhoomi's father	Kannada	Nominated, SIIMA Award for Best Supporting Actor
2013	Biriyani	Riyaz Ahmed	Tamil	
2014	Jilla	Aadhi Kesavan	Tamil	
2014	Amara	Sakthivel I.P.S	Tamil	
2014	Amma Ammamma	Sampath	Tamil	
2014	Run Raja Run	Police Commissioner Dileep Kumar	Telugu	
2014	Burma	Guna	Tamil	
2014	Power	Ganguly Bhai	Telugu	
2014	Loukyam	Babji	Telugu	
2015	S/O Satyamurthy	Veerasamy Naidu	Telugu	
2015	Pandaga Chesko	Bhupathi	Telugu	
2015	Srimanthudu	Sashi	Telugu	Nominated: SIIMA Award for Best Villain
2015	Bruce Lee	Jayaraj	Telugu	
2015	Sankarabharanam	Lal / Krishna	Telugu	
2015	Thoongaa Vanam; Cheekati Rajyam	Pedha Babu	Tamil; Telugu	
2016	Soggade Chinni Nayana	Sampath	Telugu	
2016	Krishna Gaadi Veera Prema Gaadha	ACP Srikanth	Telugu	
2016	Aadupuliyattam	Aadhishwaran	Malayalam	IIFA Utsavam for Performance in a Negative Role
2016	Kasaba	Parameshwaran Nambiar	Malayalam	
2016	Babu Bangaram	Mallesh Yadav	Telugu	
2016	Jaguar	Sreekar Prasad	Kannada; Telugu	
2017	Om Namo Venkatesaya	Raja Giridhara Raaya	Telugu	
2017	Gunturodu	Criminal Lawyer Seshu	Telugu	
2017	Rarandoi Veduka Chudham	Adi	Telugu	
2017	Raja The Great	IG Viswaraj	Telugu	
2017	Sakka Podu Podu Raja	Bhavani	Tamil	
2018	Agnyaathavaasi	Sherlock Sampath	Telugu	
2018	Kaathadi	Kathiresan	Tamil	
2018	Kaala	Vishnu Bhai	Tamil	
2018	Nela Ticket	ACP Sampath Reddy	Telugu	
2018	Pantham	Naayak	Telugu	
2018	Ghajinikanth	Sathyamoorthy	Tamil	
2018	Padi Padi Leche Manasu	Vivek Ravipati	Telugu	
2018	Adanga Maru	J.C.P Sarangan	Tamil	
2019	Anukta	Dharmaraj Shetty	Kannada	
2019	The Gambinos	Jose	Malayalam	
2019	Londonalli Lambodhara	Challa (Ekadantha)	Kannada	
2019	Jersey	Coach Ramappa Gowda	Telugu	
2019	Voter	Minister Bhanu Shankar	Telugu	
2019	RK Nagar	Lottai aka Vishwanathan	Tamil	
2020	Bheeshma	ACP Deva	Telugu	
2020	Krishna and His Leela	Krishna's father	Telugu	
2021	Red	C. I. Nagendra	Telugu	
2021	Pogaru	JB	Kannada	
2021	Check	SP Rathnam	Telugu	
2021	Kasada Thapara	Ayyodhi Vedha	Tamil	Streaming release
2021	Aranmanai 3	Rajashekar	Tamil	
2021	Drushyam 2	Gowtham Sahu IPS	Telugu	
2022	Bangarraju	Sampath	Telugu	
2022	F3	Commissioner Dileep Chandra	Telugu	
2022	Itlu Maredumilli Prajaneekam	District Collector	Telugu	
2022	Yashoda	Detective Vasudev	Telugu	
2023	Kranti	Vaman Rao	Kannada	
2023	Ravanasura	Vijay Talwar	Telugu	
2023	Agent	Prithviraj	Telugu	
2023	Custody	CBI Officer George	Telugu	
2023	Custody	CBI Officer George	Tamil	
2023	Extraordinary Man	Selvamani	Telugu	
2024	Operation Valentine	Air Commodore Mayank Mhatre	Telugu; Hindi	
2024	Rangasamudra	Money Lender	Kannada	
2025	Gana	Money Lender	Kannada	
2025	Brahma Anandam	Samarla Manohar	Telugu	
2025	Vaamana	Papanna	Kannada	
2025	Bhairavam	CI	Telugu	
2025	Phoenix	MLA Karikalan	Tamil	
2025	Mirage	SP Y. Aarumugam	Malayalam	
2026	Nari Nari Naduma Murari	Adv. Vedula Ramalingaiah	Telugu	
2026	Gharga		Kannada	
2026	Breakfast		Tamil	Credited as Sampath Kumar
2026	Sigma	Veerayya Reddy	Tamil	
2026	Shankarabharanna	PT Sudha or Sudhakara	Kannada	
2027	Harivarasanam †	TBA	Malayalam	

=== Television ===
Year	Title	Role	Language	Network	Notes
2006	Malgudi Days	Ekambharam	Hindi	Doordarshan	Only two episodes
2022	Anantham	Ananth	Tamil	ZEE5	
2023	Vyavastha	Ananth	Telugu	ZEE5	
2025	Good Wife	Gunaseelan	Tamil	JioHotstar	

=== Dubbing artist ===
Year	Title	Actor	Character	Notes
2023	Jawan	Sanjay Dutt	Madhavan Naik	Tamil dubbed version
