= Hamsa Nandini =

Indian model, dancer, and actress

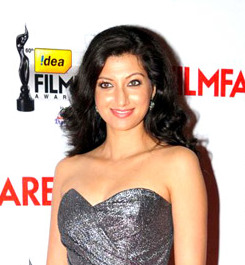
- Hamsa Nandini at the 60th Filmfare Awards South
- Born: Poonam Bartake; Pune, Maharashtra, India
- Occupations: Actress, model
- Years active: 2004–present

Hamsa Nandini (born Poonam Bartake) is an Indian model, dancer, and actress known for her works in Telugu cinema. She has modeled for MaaStars magazine, Celebrity Cricket League, and Hyderabad International Fashion week 2011 and 2013. Her birth name is Poonam, under which she appeared in her first few films, but since there were too many people named Poonam in the film industry, director Vamsy rechristened her Hamsa Nandini. In 2015, she played the warrior princess Madanika in the Telugu historical Rudhramadevi. She mainly appears in item numbers in Telugu film industry.

== Early and personal life ==
Hamsa Nandini was born and brought up in Pune. Later she moved to Mumbai to become a model . She has been in the modeling industry since 2002, and has modeled for MaaStars magazine, Celebrity Cricket League, Hyderabad International Fashion week 2011 & 2013, and various television commercials. She graduated in commerce and had enrolled in a PG (postgraduate) course in human resources in 2009.

In 2021, Hamsa Nandini announced that she has been diagnosed with a Grade III Invasive Carcinoma (Breast Cancer) via Instagram. She also revealed that she had tested positive for BRCA1 (Hereditary Breast Cancer) meaning that she would have a 70% chance of another Breast Cancer and a 45% chance of Ovarian Cancer throughout her life and only way to mitigate the risk is through some very extensive prophylactic surgeries. After undergoing cycles of chemotherapy, she resumed her work in December 2022.

== Item numbers ==
In 2013, all her four releases, Mirchi, Bhai, Atharintiki Daaredi and Ramayya Vasthavayya featured her in item numbers. She stated that she was happy "doing a five-minute dance number" as it gives her "phenomenal reach" and "a good platform to reach out to the masses".

== Filmography ==
Year	Film	Role	Language	Notes	Ref.
2004	Okatavudaam		Telugu		
2005	786 Khaidi Premakatha	Roshini	Telugu	credited as Poonam Bartake	
2006	Mohini 9886788888	Mohini	Kannada	credited as Poonam	
2006	Corporate		Hindi		
2007	Anumanaspadam	Devika	Telugu		
2008	Gita	Hamsa	Telugu		
2009	Adhineta	Hamsa	Telugu		
2009	Pravarakhyudu	Jyotirmayi	Telugu		
2011	Aha Naa Pellanta		Telugu		
2012	Naa Ishtam		Telugu		
2012	Eega	Chandrakala	Telugu	Cameo appearance	
2012	Naan Ee	Chandrakala	Tamil	Cameo appearance	
2013	Mirchi		Telugu	Special appearance in the song "Mirchi"	
2013	Bhai		Telugu	Special appearance in the song "Most Wanted"	
2013	Ramayya Vasthavayya		Telugu	Special appearance	
2013	Atharintiki Daaredi		Telugu	Special appearance in the song "Its time to party"	
2014	Legend		Telugu	Special appearance in the song "Lusku Tapa"	
2014	Loukyam	Hamsa Sippy	Telugu	Supporting role	
2014	Real Star		Telugu		
2015	Rudramadevi	Madanika	Telugu		
2015	Bengal Tiger		Telugu	Special appearance in the song "Bengal Tiger"	
2016	Soggade Chinni Nayana	Hamsa	Telugu		
2016	Srirastu Subhamastu	Nandhini	Telugu	Special appearance in the song "Desi Girl"	
2017	Kittu Unnadu Jagratha		Telugu	Special appearance in the song "Na Pere Singapore Sirimalle"	
2017	Jai Lava Kusa	VA Rajini	Telugu		
2018	Pantham	Naayak's Client	Telugu		
