= Loukyam =

- Movie Poster
- Directed by: Sriwass
- Screenplay by: Kona Venkat; Gopimohan
- Story by: Sridhar Seepana
- Produced by: V. Anand Prasad
- Starring: Gopichand; Rakul Preet Singh; Nadhiya
- Cinematography: Vetri Palanisamy
- Edited by: M. S. Rajashekhar Reddy (S. R. Shekhar)
- Music by: Anoop Rubens
- Production company: Bhavya Creations
- Release date: 26 September 2014
- Running time: 149 minutes
- Country: India
- Language: Telugu

Loukyam (transl. Wit) is a 2014 Indian Telugu-language action comedy film directed by Sriwass. The film stars Gopichand, Rakul Preet Singh, Brahmanandam, Mukesh Rishi, and Sampath Raj. It is produced by V. Anand Prasad on Bhavya Creations banner. Kona Venkat and Gopimohan provided the screenplay form a story written by Sridhar Seepana. The film has music composed by Anup Rubens.

The film was launched formally on 11 April 2014 at Film Nagar in Hyderabad. The film released worldwide on 26 September 2014, to a positive critical reception. It was a blockbuster at the box-office, grossing over ₹41.55 crore and earning a distributor's share of ₹21.6 crore. The film won Nandi Award for Best Popular Feature Film. It was remade in Bengali as Besh Korechi Prem Korechi, Kannada as Ram-Leela and Tamil as Sakka Podu Podu Raja. The film was later dubbed in Hindi as Ek Khiladi.

== Plot ==
Loukyam opens with Venkateswarlu “Venky” (Gopichand) kidnapping Neetu (Shyamala), Babji's sister as she is marrying Bharath (Bharath Reddy) although she is in love with someone else. He leaves for Hyderabad and waits for everything in his home, Warangal to clear. He stays with his friend, Shyamala (Satyam Rajesh). There he falls for Chandrakala (Rakul Preet), the sister of Sathya (Rahul Dev), a don in Hyderabad. Chandrakala rags other students in the college using her brother's power. After her initial rejection, Venky gets her to reciprocate his feelings. Meanwhile, Babji (Sampath Raj) arrives in Hyderabad to reach Sippy (Brahmanandam), the driver who helped Venky kidnap Neetu. Babji, unaware of the fact that he is traveling in Sippy's taxi, goes around Hyderabad with a rising television actor named Boiling star Bablu (Prudhviraj).

Meanwhile, Keshava Reddy (Mukesh Rishi) is an MLA, who is behind Chandrakala's life attacks her, through which Venky discovers that Chandrakala is Babji's second sister and that he had sent her with Sathya to Hyderabad to maintain a low profile. Babji readies Chandrakala to marry Bharath. He also continues to search for whoever (Venky) abducted his sister. Using the help of Nano Shastri (Krishna Bhagavaan), Venky manages to get Babji and Chandrakala into his house. He also learns that the reason Kesava Reddy wants to kill Chandrakala is that his younger sister Vasanthi killed herself because she loved Babji although he did not reciprocate the same. He hires Hamsa Sippy (Hamsa Nandini), Sippy's wife, to act like his father, Meka Papa Rao (Chandra Mohan) aka Puppy's wife.

He tells Neetu to come back on the engagement day to act as if not married and Babji fixes the marriage of Neetu with Bharat, but they learn that Neetu is pregnant and so Bharat refuses to marry. Venky tells Babji that his brother (who is Neetu's husband and is acting as Venky's brother) will marry Neetu. Babji agrees to the wedding and, in turn, tells Chandrakala that she is to marry Bharat again. Through an attack incident, Venky learns that Bharat is Kesava Reddy's son. He tells Kesava Reddy that even Babji is aware of this fact and is planning to kill Bharat on a trip to Srisailam. Kesava Reddy ends up believing him and attacks Babji and the group on the way. He foolishly reveals to Babji that Bharat is his son and is aware that Babji will kill him.

When Kesava Reddy realizes his folly, he kidnaps Chandrakala and Bharat and escapes from the spot. Bablu who mistakes it to be a movie shoot stops Kesava Reddy on the way which gives Venky enough time to reach Kesava Reddy. In the end, Venky gets Babji to beat up Kesava Reddy and using his sympathy, which he had earlier used to get Babji and his sister together, he gets Babji to agree to his and Chandrakala's wedding as well.

== Cast ==
- Gopichand as Venkateswarlu "Venky"
- Rakul Preet as Chandrakala "Chandu"
- Brahmanandam as Sipaana "Sippy" Sridhar
- Mukesh Rishi as Keshava Reddy
- Sampath Raj as Warangal Babji
- Rahul Dev as Sathya
- Giri Babu as Rama Chandra Murthy
- Chandra Mohan as Meka Papa Rao "Puppy", Venky's father
- Pragathi as Lalita, Venky's mother
- Bharath Reddy as Bharath (S/O Keshava Reddy)
- Prabhakar as Shankar
- Hamsa Nandini as Hamsa Sippy
- Shyamala as Neetu, Chandu's elder sister
- Posani Krishna Murali as Guptaji
- Krishna Bhagavaan as Nano Shastri
- Raghu Babu as Leela
- Prudhviraj as 'Boiling Star' Bablu
- Banerjee as Minister
- Satyam Rajesh as Shyamala, Venky's friend
- Gundu Sudharshan as Director
- Anand Ramaraju as Anand (Neetu's lover turned Husband, Venky's friend Acting as Cousin of Venky)
- Giridhar as Venky's friend
- Kasi Viswanath as Principal
- Raghu Karumanchi as Banti, Babji's henchman
- Ramachandra as a College student
- Shakalaka Shankar as student
- Sarika Ramachandra Rao as Director
- Harish Siva as Mukesh

== Soundtrack ==
Loukyam

Soundtrack album by Anoop Rubens
- Released: 3 August 2014
- Recorded: 2014
- Genre: Soundtrack
- Length: 19:05
- Label: Aditya Music
- Producer: Anoop Rubens

Anoop Rubens chronology
Oka Laila Kosam (2014)	Loukyam (2014)	Pilla Nuvvu Leni Jeevitam (2014)

Music composed by Anoop Rubens. The music released on Aditya Music.

Track-List
No.	Title	Lyrics	Singer(s)	Length
1.	"Soodu Soodu"	Ramajogayya Sastry	Dhanunjay, Ramya Behara	3:44
2.	"Tere Beautiful Anke"	Anup Rubens, Sweekar	Raja Hasan, Sweekar Agasthi	3:25
3.	"Ninnu Chudagane"	Ananta Sriram	Vijay Prakash, Mohana Bhogaraju	3:57
4.	"Pink Lips"	Sri Mani	Jaspreet Jasz, Sahithi	4:08
5.	"Sur Super"	Chandrabose	Simha, Ranina Reddy	3:56
Total length:				19:05

== Production ==
=== Development ===
After his directorial Pandavulu Pandavulu Tummeda released on 31 January 2014, Sriwass announced his next film with Gopichand as the protagonist with V. Anand Prasad producing the film on Bhavya Creations banner. The news was confirmed by a press release on 20 February 2014 which added that Sridhar Seepana wrote the story and the dialogues, Kona Venkat and Gopimohan penned the screenplay of the film. Sriwass said that the film is in its Pre-production stages and the film's shooting would begin in April 2014. The film was launched on 11 April 2014 at Film Nagar in Hyderabad by conducting a small pooja ceremony at the Venkateswara Temple there. On that day, it was declared that Anoop Rubens is the music director, Vetri is the cinematographer, Vivek is the Art director, P. L. M. Khan is the executive producer and Kanal Kannan is the action choreographer. The makers said that the film is set in the city of Hyderabad. On 27 July 2014 a press release confirmed that the film has been titled as Loukyam. Collections-51+ crores

=== Casting ===
Sriwass said that Gopichand will be seen as a "diplomatic young man who handles any difficult situation with a smile on his face". In the end of March 2014, Rakul Preet Singh was selected as the female lead of the movie which marked her first collaboration with both Gopichand and Sriwass. In July 2014, a press release confirmed that Hamsa Nandini is playing a cameo and would also do an item number. Confirming her inclusion, Hamsa Nandini revealed her role in the film in an interview with The Times of India. She said, "This is the first time I am experimenting with comedy and I am excited about how things are shaping up. All I can say is that my role has a surprise element. I play the role of a woman who thinks she's too intelligent when she clearly isn't." It was known on 5 August 2014 that Brahmanandam's character in the film is named Sippy and his role would stay till the climax of the movie. Rakul Preet Singh also added that her character in the film is titled Chandrakala.

=== Filming ===
The regular shooting began on 18 April 2014 at Hyderabad. After completing the first schedule, filming continued in the end of May 2014 at Ramoji Film City in Hyderabad where an action sequence was shot on Gopichand and Pradeep Rawat under the supervision of Kanal Kannan. The sequences were also shot near JNTU campus where Rakul Preet Singh was spot filming the shots alongside Gopichand. Later, another press release stated that 50% of the film's shoot is complete and with the completion of the schedule starting from 17 June 2014, the shoot of the film's talkie part would come to an end. It added that 3 songs will be filmed in abroad locations. On 27 July 2014 a press release confirmed that the next schedule would begin from 5 August 2014 in which songs would be filmed. The item number was shot on Gopichand and Hamsa Nandini at Ramanaidu Studios in Nanakramguda on 5 August 2014 and by then, the film's talkie part was completed. The last schedule started at Europe on 23 August 2014 and 3 songs were shot on the lead pair. A press release on 31 August 2014 stated that the film's shoot has been wrapped up and has entered post-production phase.

== Release ==
In July 2014, it was reported that the film would release in September 2014. Later the film's producer added that the film would release in the third week of September 2014 if all goes well. On 31 August 2014 the makers announced that the film would release worldwide on 26 September 2014. The movie was released in Hindi language on YouTube as Ek Khiladi in the year 2015.

=== Marketing ===
At the end of July 2014, the makers released few stills featuring the protagonists. The stills featuring Gopichand and Hamsa Nandini from the film's item number were officially released on 5 August 2014 by the makers. The first look poster featuring Gopichand was released on 15 August 2014 on the eve of 68th Independence Day of India. The film's first look teaser was launched on 18 August 2014.
