= Londonalli Lambodhara =

Indian Kannada-language comedy drama film

- Release poster
- Directed by: Raj Surya
- Starring: Santhosh; Shruti Prakash; Sampath Raj
- Music by: Pranav Iyengar
- Production company: London Screens
- Release date: 29 March 2019
- Country: India
- Language: Kannada

Londonalli Lambodhara (transl. Lambodhara in London) is a 2019 Indian Kannada-language comedy drama film directed by Raj Surya, who assisted Suni and Sadhu Kokila. The film stars Santhosh and Shruti Prakash while Sampath Raj plays an important role. The film premiered at London.

== Cast ==
- Santhosh as Lambodhara
- Shruti Prakash as Rashmi
- Sampath Raj as Ekadantha aka Challa
- Achyuth Kumar as Lambodhara's father
- Sudha Belawadi as Lambodhara's mother
- Sadhu Kokila as Sadhu

== Production ==
Twenty-one NRIs in the United Kingdom produced the film. Seventy percent of the film was shot in London.

== Soundtrack ==
The film features a song "Ee Manasu Alemaari" sung by Shruthi Prakash and Deepak Doddera and composed by Pranav Iyengar.

== Reception ==
A critic from The New Indian Express wrote that "While director Raj Surya uses humour generously in the first half, he loses track in the second half where, in a bid to stretch the film’s length, he repeats scenes". A critic from The News Minute opined that "The film tries hard to blend several themes – family, drama, comedy, and motherland sentiment - which leave the audience confused about what to take from the movie. If meaningless comedy isn’t your choice, you can give Lambodhara a miss". A critic from The Times of India stated that "This movie is recommended for those who enjoy monotonous comedy, laced with some motherland sentiment drama".
