= Rarandoi Veduka Chudham =

- Theatrical release poster
- Directed by: Kalyan Krishna Kurasala
- Screenplay by: Satyanand
- Story by: Kalyan Krishna Kurasala
- Produced by: Nagarjuna Akkineni
- Starring: Naga Chaitanya; Rakul Preet Singh; Jagapathi Babu; Sampath Raj
- Cinematography: S. V. Vishweshwar
- Edited by: Gautham Raju
- Music by: Devi Sri Prasad
- Production company: Annapurna Studios
- Release date: 26 May 2017
- Running time: 150 minutes
- Country: India
- Language: Telugu
- Budget: ₹20 crore
- Box office: est. ₹50 crore

Rarandoi Veduka Chudham (transl. Come, let's watch the celebrations) is a 2017 Indian Telugu-language romantic comedy film written and directed by Kalyan Krishna Kurasala, and produced by Nagarjuna Akkineni under Annapurna Studios banner. It stars Naga Chaitanya, Rakul Preet Singh, Jagapathi Babu and Sampath Raj. The film was released on 26 May 2017.

The music is composed by Devi Sri Prasad, while cinematography is done by N. Vishweshwar and editing by Gautham Raju. The film received positive reviews and with a collection over ₹50 crore, it was termed a box office success.

== Cast ==
- Naga Chaitanya as Shiva, Bhramaramba’s love interest
- Rakul Preet Singh as Bhramaramba “Bhrama”, Shiva’s love interest
  - Avantika Vandanapu as young Bhramarambha
- Jagapathi Babu as Krishna, Shiva’s father & colleague
- Sampath Raj as Aadhinarayana
- Irshad as Prabhakar
- Vennela Kishore as Kishore, Shiva’s friend
- Kousalya as Kaushalya, Aadhi's wife
- Annapurna as Lakshmi, Aadhi's mother
- Chalapathi Rao as Suryanarayana, Aadhi's father
- Priya as Priya, Krishna’s wife
- Anitha Chowdary as Shiva's sister
- Pruthviraj as Dorababu
- Banerjee as Banerjee
- Surekha Vani as Surekha
- Posani Krishna Murali as Rambabu
- Raghu Babu as Bhaskar
- Saptagiri as Bangaram
- Madhunandan as Ravi
- Satya Krishnan
- Thagubothu Ramesh as Govind
- Duvvasi Mohan
- Chitti
- Prabhu
- Rajitha
- Soundarya as Shiva's mother (photographic appearance)

== Production ==
The director of the film is Kalyan Krishna Kurasala. The film's first look was released on 28 March 2017 on Ugadi by Nagarjuna through his official Facebook page. Naga Chaitanya shared through Twitter that two posters of the film were released at the same time since Producer Nagarjuna and director Kalyan Krishna was not able to decide which poster to go with. It was Naga Chaitanya's third collaboration with music director Devi Sri Prasad after 100% Love and Dhada and first collaboration with director Kurasala.

== Soundtrack ==
Rarandoi Veduka Chudham

Soundtrack album by Devi Sri Prasad
- Released: 24 March 2017
- Recorded: 2016
- Genre: Soundtrack
- Length: 23:00
- Label: Aditya Music
- Producer: Devi Sri Prasad

Devi Sri Prasad chronology
Nenu Local (2017)	Rarandoi Veduka Chudham (2017)	DJ (2016)
External audio
- Official Audio Jukebox on YouTube

The music was composed by Devi Sri Prasad and was released on Aditya Music Company. The audio function was grandly held on 24 March 2017 at Annapurna Studios.

No.	Title	Lyrics	Singer(s)	Length
1.	"Raarandoi Veduka Choodham"	Ramajogayya Sastry	Ranjith, Gopika Poornima	4:18
2.	"Neevente Nenunte"	Sri Mani	Kapil, Shweta Mohan	3:50
3.	"Bhramarambaki"	Sri Mani	Sagar	3:45
4.	"Thakita Thakajham"	Sri Mani	Javed Ali	3:53
5.	"Break-Up"	Bhaskarabhatla Ravi Kumar	Simha, Dhanunjay, Naga Chaitanya Dialogues	3:39
6.	"Thakita Thakajham (Rock)"	Sri Mani	Javed Ali	3:24
Total length:				23:00

== Reception ==
=== Box office ===
Rarandoi Veduka Chudham, in two days collected a total gross of ₹ 11.86 Crores and a share of ₹ 5.84 Crores worldwide. In its first week, the film collected a total gross of ₹ 32 crores and a share of ₹ 18.50 Crores worldwide. The film collected a total gross of ₹ 50 Crores and a share of ₹ 28 Crores worldwide in its lifetime run.

In the first weekend, Rarandoi Veduka Chudham beat movies like Sachin: A Billion Dreams at the US box office by collecting a total gross of US$369,672.

=== Critical reception ===
Firstpost gave 3 out of 5 stars and noted, "Rarandoi Veduka Choodham ends up being a crowd-pleasing film in the end. The trick lies in making you yearn for the feeling of being together, despite all odds. It’s the theme of most family dramas in Telugu films and Rarandoi Veduka Choodham is no different".

IndiaGlitz gave 3 out of 5 stars and noted, "A wafer-thin and predictable story, 'RVC' comes with an excellent characterization of the heroine, and largely fine performances. Proper spacing of songs was needed. All said, there are elements that could appeal to family audiences".

The Times of India gave 2.5 out of 5 stars and noted, "Rarandoi Veduka Chudham uses the age-old run-of-the-mill set-up to establish the story and its characters. As far as the plot is concerned, there is nothing new that one can expect from the family drama - fathers pampering their children, children falling in love with the enemy’s son and the clichés. Finally, when things are set to take an offbeat turn, a simple clarification of a misunderstanding brings the plot to a happy ending; bummer!".

India Today gave 2 out of 5 stars and noted, "If you chose to overlook its shortcomings, Rarandoi Veduka Chudham should 'entertain' you. Director has assembled some of the finest comedians in the industry and hence, it cracks you up every now and then. Chaitanya's scenes with Vennela Kishore save the day."

== Awards and nominations ==
Year	Award	Category	Recipient(s)	Result	Ref.
2017	Zee Telugu Golden Awards	Favorite Film of the Year	Rarandoi Veduka Chudham	Won	
2017	Zee Telugu Golden Awards	Entertainer of the Year	Naga Chaitanya	Nominated	
2018	Filmfare Awards South	Best Actress – Telugu	Rakul Preet Singh	Nominated	
2018	South Indian International Movie Awards	Best Lyricist (Telugu)	Sri Mani	Nominated	
2019	TSR – TV9 National Film Awards	Best Actress	Rakul Preet Singh	Won	
