= 786 Khaidi Premakatha =

Indian Telugu-language romantic action drama film

- Directed by: K. S. Nageswara Rao
- Screenplay by: K. S. Nageswara Rao
- Dialogue by: Posani Krishna Murali
- Produced by: R. V. Rao
- Starring: Laksh Chadalavada; Yana Sheik; Hamsa Nandini
- Cinematography: Jaswant
- Music by: M. M. Srilekha
- Production company: Indian film Corporation
- Release date: 4 February 2005
- Country: India
- Language: Telugu

786 Khaidi Premakatha (transl. Prisoner #786's love story) is a 2005 Indian Telugu-language romantic action drama film directed by K. S. Nageswara Rao and starring Laksh Chadalavada (credited as Shashikanth), Yana Sheik, and Hamsa Nandini (credited as Poonam Bhartke). Despite negative reviews, Laksh Chadalavada stated that it had been a commercial success.

== Cast ==
- Laksh Chadalavada as Rajesh
- Yana Sheik as Alekya
- Hamsa Nandini as Roshini
- Anandaraj as Harischandra Prasad
- Brahmanandam as Changala Rayudu
- M. S. Narayana
- Potti Veerayya
- AVS
- Jeeva
- Sriman
- Raghu Babu as Police Officer
- Gajar Khan
- Uttej
- Raghunatha Reddy
- Tirupathi Prakash
- Kallu Chidambaram
- Padma Jayanti as a widowed mother
- Shakeela
- Chandrika
- Anitha
- Sarika

== Soundtrack ==
The music was composed by M. M. Srilekha and the lyrics were written by Bhaskarabhatla. An audio launch was held on 7 January 200 in Hyderabad.

== Reception ==
Jeevi of Idlebrain.com rated the film 2 1/2 out of 5 and wrote that "Director KS Nageswara Rao exhibited expertise in action sequences. Other than that he could not succeed in holding interest element in narration and maintaining grip on the proceedings on the film".
