= Kalyan Krishna =

Indian film screenwriter and director

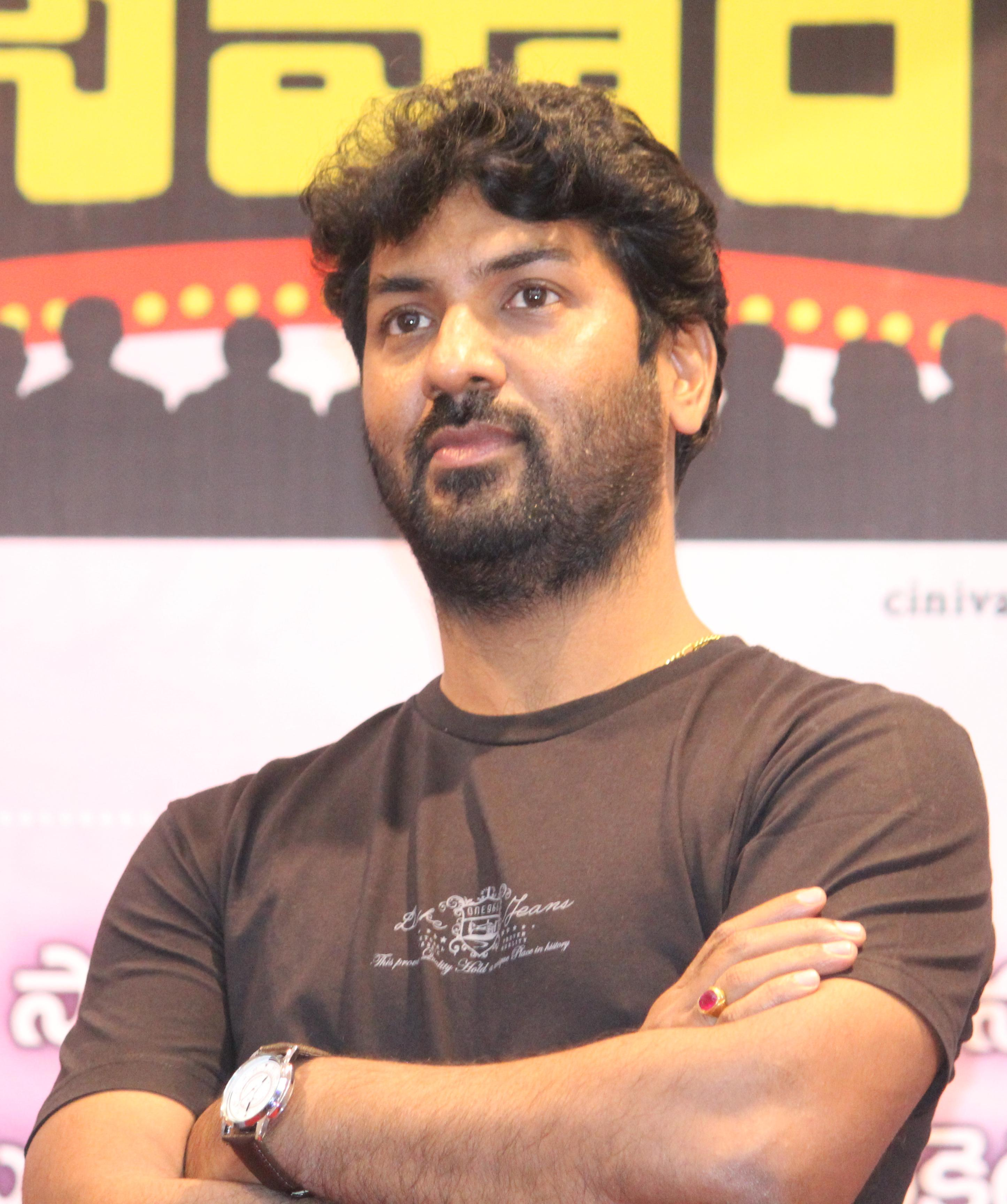
- Born: Kalyan Krishna Kurusala
- Occupation: Director
- Years active: 2016–present

Kalyan Krishna Kurasala is an Indian film screenwriter and director known for his works primarily in Telugu cinema. He made his directorial debut in 2016 with Soggade Chinni Nayana and went on direct Rarandoi Veduka Chudham (2017) Nela Ticket (2018) and Bangarraju (2022).

After making Nela Ticket, he took a break from movies due to the death of his brother followed by COVID-19 pandemic in India. He made a comeback with Bangarraju, released in 2022.

== Filmography ==
Year	Title	Director	Writer	Notes
2016	Soggade Chinni Nayana	Yes	Dialogues	Directorial debut
2017	Rarandoi Veduka Chudham	Yes	Story and dialogues	
2018	Nela Ticket	Yes	Story and dialogues	
2022	Bangarraju	Yes	Story	Sequel to Soggade Chinni Nayana
