= Krithi Shetty =

Indian actress (born 2003)

- Shetty in 2024
- Born: Krithi Krishna Shetty; 21 September 2003 (age 23); Mangalore, Karnataka, India
- Occupation: Actress
- Years active: 2019–present

Krithi Shetty (born 21 September 2003) is an Indian actress who primarily works in Telugu and Tamil films. Shetty is an recipient of a Filmfare Award South and a SIIMA Award. She made her acting debut in the Telugu film Uppena (2021) which won her the Filmfare Award for Best Female Debut – South. She then received commercial success with Shyam Singha Roy (2021), Bangarraju (2022), Manamey (2024) and ARM (2024).

== Early life ==
Krithi Shetty was born on 21 September 2003 in Mangalore, Karnataka, to a Tulu-speaking Bunt family. Her father is a businessman, and her mother is a fashion designer. During her academic career, she worked in commercials.

== Career ==
=== Early success and setback (2019-2023) ===
Following a minor role in the Hindi film Super 30, Shetty made her debut in a lead role with the Telugu film Uppena, directed by Buchi Babu Sana and produced by Mythri Movie Makers and Sukumar Writings. The film was commercially successful at the box office, collecting over ₹100 crore (US$11 million). Her performance as a zamindar's daughter was well received. Neeshitha Nyayapati stated, "The debutants Vaisshnav and Krithi manage to pull off the intricacies of their characters well for the most part. The film earned her nomination for Filmfare Award for Best Actress – Telugu and won her the Filmfare Award for Best Female Debut – South. Later that year, she appeared as a psychology student in the Telugu film Shyam Singha Roy opposite Nani. It received mixed to positive reviews from critics and was a commercial success grossing over ₹60 crore at the box office, and becoming the seventh highest-grossing Telugu film of the year.

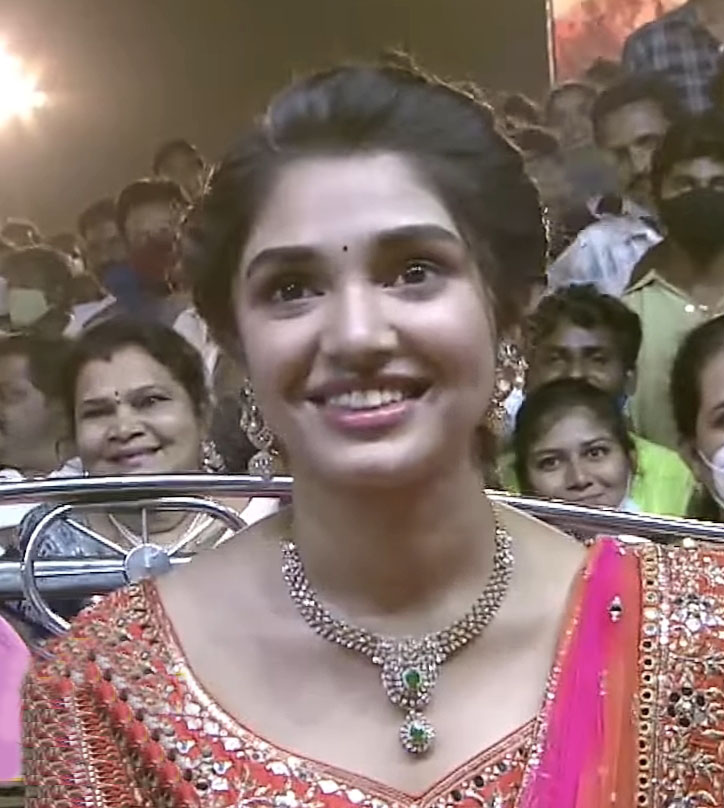
Shetty in 2022

Shetty had four releases in 2022– Bangarraju opposite Naga Chaitanya, Macherla Niyojakavargam opposite Nithin, Aa Ammayi Gurinchi Meeku Cheppali opposite Sudheer Babu, and The Warriorr opposite Ram Pothineni. Among these only Bangarraju emerged as a commercial success. Other films failed at the box office. Reviewing Bangarraju, Murali Krishna CH noted, "Kriti does a lot better and gets into the part really well. Her on-screen chemistry with Chaitanya is a delight to watch." In 2023, she made her Tamil debut with the bilingual Custody, opposite Naga Chaitanya. It opened to mixed reviews and was a box office failure.

=== Career fluctuations (2024-present) ===
Following the setback, Shetty found commercial success with both of her 2024 releases. She first starred in the Telugu film Manamey opposite Sharwanand, where she co-parents her friend's child. The film emerged a box office success. Balakrishna Ganeshan felt she deliver her roles with "conviction". She then played a rich woman who loves an electrician opposite Tovino Thomas in ARM, which marked her Malayalam film debut. A box office success, it became one of the highest-grossing Malayalam films of all time. Anandu Suresh noted, "Despite Malayalam not being her first language, Krithi shines as Lakshmi, with her lip-syncing being impressively accurate."

Following no release in 2025, Shetty appeared in two Tamil films in 2026. She appeared opposite Karthi in Vaa Vaathiyaar and opposite Pradeep Ranganathan in Love Insurance Kompany. Both films received mixed to negative reviews and became major commercial failures at the box office.

== Filmography ==
Key
†	Denotes films that have not yet been released

Year	Title	Role	Language	Notes	Ref.
2019	Super 30	Excellence student	Hindi	Debut in a minor role	
2021	Uppena	Sangeetha "Bebamma"	Telugu	Telugu Debut as a Lead Actress	
2021	Shyam Singha Roy	Keerthi	Telugu		
2022	Bangarraju	President Naga Lakshmi	Telugu		
2022	Macherla Niyojakavargam	Swathi	Telugu		
2022	Aa Ammayi Gurinchi Meeku Cheppali	Dr. Alekhya & Akhila	Telugu	Dual role	
2022	The Warriorr	RJ "Whistle" Mahalakshmi	Telugu; Tamil	Bilingual film; Tamil Debut	
2023	Custody	Revathi	Telugu; Tamil	Bilingual film	
2024	Manamey	Subhadra	Telugu		
2024	ARM	Lekshmi Nambiar	Malayalam	Malayalam Debut	
2026	Vaa Vaathiyaar	Wu	Tamil		
2026	Love Insurance Kompany	Dheema	Tamil		
2026	Genie †	TBA	Tamil	Completed	
2027	January 12 Vidudala †	Deepu	Telugu	Filming	
2027	Hum Tere Pyaar Mein †	TBA	Hindi	Debut as lead actress in Hindi; Filming	

== Awards and nominations ==
Year	Award	Category	Work	Result	Ref.
2022	South Indian International Movie Awards	Best Female Debut – Telugu	Uppena	Won	
2022	Filmfare Awards South	Best Actress – Telugu	Uppena	Nominated	
2022	Filmfare Awards South	Best Female Debut – South	Uppena	Won	
2025	South Indian International Movie Awards	Best Female Debut – Malayalam	ARM	Nominated	
