= 120 Bahadur =

2025 Indian film by Razneesh Ghai

- Theatrical release poster
- Directed by: Razneesh 'Razy' Ghai
- Written by: Rajiv G. Menon
- Dialogues by: Sumit Arora
- Produced by: Farhan Akhtar; Ritesh Sidhwani; Amit Chandra
- Starring: Farhan Akhtar; Raashii Khanna; Vivan Bhatena; Ankit Siwach
- Narrated by: Amitabh Bachchan
- Cinematography: Tetsuo Nagata
- Edited by: Rameshwar S. Bhagat
- Music by: Songs: Amit Trivedi; Salim–Sulaiman; Amjad Nadeem Aamir; Score: Satish Raghunathan
- Production companies: Excel Entertainment; Trigger Happy Studios
- Distributed by: AA Films
- Release date: 21 November 2025
- Running time: 137 minutes
- Country: India
- Language: Hindi
- Budget: est. ₹80–90 crore
- Box office: est. ₹20 crore

120 Bahadur (transl. 120 Bravehearts) is a 2025 Indian Hindi-language historical war film directed by Razneesh ‘Razy’ Ghai and produced by Excel Entertainment and Trigger Happy Studios. The film stars Farhan Akhtar as Major Shaitan Singh and Raashii Khanna in a Special appearance as Shugan Kanwar, the wife of Shaitan Singh. The film recounts the Battle of Rezang La, considered one of the major events of the Sino-Indian War and fought on 18 November 1962, when 120 soldiers of the Charlie Company, 13 Kumaon Regiment, made up of Ahirs, defended their post against a 3000-strong Chinese Army contingent, inflicting on them over 1300 casualties.

The film portrays Major Shaitan Singh Bhati, who was posthumously conferred the Param Vir Chakra which is India's highest military honour, for his bravery in the Battle of Rezang La. It was theatrically released on 21 November 2025 and was featured in the Gala Premiere section of the 56th IFFI. The film received positive reviews from critics with praise for the performances and war sequences but some criticised the screenplay. The film was declared tax-free in Delhi and Rajasthan. It was a box-office bomb, grossing ₹20 crore worldwide.

== Plot ==
During 1962, rising tensions between India and China escalate in the icy heights of Ladakh. Major Shaitan Singh Bhati, takes command of Charlie Company, 13 Kumaon Regiment — a battalion of 120 determined soldiers. His loving yet anxious wife, Shagun Kanwar, prays for his safe return even as she understands the sacrifices that lie ahead. Under Shaitan Singh, the unit is led by experienced soldiers like Ramlal, the cheerful and spirited rifleman; the respected Jemadar Surja Ram and Jemadar Hariram Singh, both steady and seasoned leaders; the dedicated radio operator Ramchander Yadav, and the young Nanha, who dreams of glory but fears the war ahead.

As winter closes in and Chinese forces begin massing along the border, Charlie Company is sent to hold Rezang La — an exposed, freezing mountain pass with no artillery support. Major Shaitan Singh strengthens positions, assigning Jemadar Saab and others to forward firing posts, while Sepoys Nihal Singh and Dharampal Dahiya help fortify machine gun nests. Ramlal, Jairam “Kaka”, and Baingan share moments of lighthearted banter, hiding their fear behind humor. At headquarters, Brigadier Raina and Lt. Col. Dhingra do what they can, but both know the grim truth — the men will have to hold on their own until support arrives, if it ever does. Faced with eminent rout the seniors give Shaitan Singh and his men option to retreat, but that is when Shaitan Singh utters the famous words -Hum Peeche Nahi Hatenge. The Chinese attack begins before dawn in a terrifying bombardment. Waves of enemy infantry crash upon the Indian posts in the freezing darkness. Wave after wave the Chinese attacks are repulsed by the Charlie Company despite taking heavy casualties. By mid-afternoon it turns into a last stand with Shaitan Singh and others refusing to abandon their positions. By the days end, only 6 of the 120 soldiers of Charlie Company are able to survive the Chinese onslaught.

In the emotional aftermath, the six survivors, including Ramchander Yadav and Nihal Singh, recount the battle to commanders. Brigadier Raina and Lt. Col. Dhingra are shaken by the scale of the sacrifice. Major Shaitan Singh who succumbs to his wounds is later awarded the Param Vir Chakra, India's highest war-time gallantry award; while several soldiers receive other war-time gallantry awards posthumously. The final scenes show families receiving the news — Shaitan Singh's wife, and others, holding back tears but proud of their loved ones. Film closes with a tribute to all 120 soldiers who turned Rezang La into a symbol of unmatched courage, duty, and national pride.

== Cast ==
- Farhan Akhtar as Major Shaitan Singh Bhati, PVC, company commander of Charlie Company, 13 Kumaon Regiment
- Raashii Khanna as Shugan Kanwari Singh, wife of Shaitan Singh (Special appearance)
- Ankit Siwach as Sepoy Ramlal
- Vivan Bhatena as Jemadar Surja Ram, VrC, platoon commander of 7th platoon, Charlie company
- Dhanveer Singh as Jemadar Hariram Singh, VrC, platoon commander of 8th platoon, Charlie company
- Sahib Verma as Nanha
- Sparsh Walia as Sepoy (later Honorary Captain) Ramchander Yadav, radio operator of Maj Shaitan Singh
- Ajinkya Deo as Brigadier (later General) T.N. Raina, MVC, SM, brigade commander of 144 mountain brigade
- Eijaz Khan as Lieutenant colonel (later Colonel) H.S. Dhingra, AVSM, commanding officer of 13 Kumaon Regiment
- Ashutosh Shukla as Sepoy Dharampal Singh Dahiya, VrC, Nursing assistant of Army Medical Corps attached to Charlie company, 13 Kumaon Regiment
- Atul Singh as Sepoy (later Havildar) Nihal Singh, SM
- Brijesh Karanwal as Havildar Jairam Kaka, cook of Charlie company, 13 Kumaon Regiment
- Azzy Bagria as Havildar Ram Singh, Driver of Charlie company, 13 Kumaon Regiment
- Devendra Ahirwar as Baingan
- Digvijay Pratap as Jemadar (later Honorary Captain) Ram Chander, VrC, platoon commander of 9th platoon, Charlie company
- Marcus Mok as General Gao
- Chien Ho Liao as Chinese sergeant
- Thutan Gombu as Chinese sniper
- Rayomand Jagus as President of India

== Production ==
The film has been produced by Excel Entertainment and Trigger Happy Studios, with Rucha Pathak, Kassim Jagmagia, Vishal Ramchandani, and Jigyasa Sharma as co-producers, Arhan Bagati as the associate executive producer, and Sunitha Ram as the executive producer.

=== Development ===
The first-look poster of the film was released on 18 November 2024, as a tribute on the 62nd anniversary of the Battle of Rezang La, which is recognised as a legendary battle fought on the freezing heights of Eastern Ladakh. Based on the true story, the film marks the return to acting for Farhan Akhtar after three years of Toofaan (2021). In the film he portrays the role of Major Shaitan Singh Bhati. While music is being composed by Amit Trivedi; the lyrics have been penned by acclaimed poet and lyricist, Javed Akhtar who is also father of Farhan Akhtar. While Tetsuo Nagata, a Japanese-born French cinematographer has been recruited as DOP for the film. Rameshwar S. Bhagat has been recruited as editor for the film.

The film's dialogue have been written by Sumit Arora and screenplay is by Rajiv G Menon. In order to recreate the battle scene with authenticity, the makers of the film brought in Snow Business to recreate vast snow-covered landscape. For developing authentic looking action sequences for the film and to keep the theme intact, the producers roped in the same action team that worked on a recent Oscar-winning World War 1 film. During shooting in Ladakh, a team of over 600 was present to manage fighting and explosive scenes. To prepare for the film, lead actor Farhan Akhtar who is essaying the role of Major Shaitan Singh Bhati, and other actors underwent a significant transformation, with military-style training including hand-to-hand combat and acclimatisation for high altitude. Choreography has been done by Vijay Ganguly.

=== Casting ===
The film marks Farhan Akhtar's return to acting after three years since Toofaan, as he portrays the role of Shaitan Singh. Raashii Khanna plays the female lead opposite him. The cast also includes Sparsh Walia, Ankit Siwach, Vivan Bhatena, Dhanveer Singh, and Sahib Verma in key roles, along with Eijaz Khan and Ajinkya Deo. Mrunal Thakur, Paresh Rawal, and Hussain Dalal are also part of the cast. Most of the actors playing soldiers are first-time performers who had never faced the camera before and were trained through a grueling six-month program by an international action team.

=== Filming ===
Principal photography of the film commenced on 4 September 2024, in Ladakh with logistical support of Indian Army and has been shot majorly in Ladakh, with some scenes in Rajasthan and Mumbai. A large part of the film has been shot in the high hills of Ladakh at a height of 14,000 feet where actors battled not just temperatures of -10 degrees Celsius but also a lack of oxygen. In late January the final schedule of the film was held in Jaipur, Rajasthan over 10 days where flashback scenes related to Farhan's character Shaitan Singh were shot. The 15-day Mumbai schedule was concluded in December 2024. Filming in harsh terrain of Ladakh was difficult, even Eijaz Khan considered a fit actor suffered breathing trouble on the 2nd day of the shoot. During the filming, the actors were trained by the team that worked in All Quiet on the Western Front in body language, hand-to-hand combat, weapons handling, as well as on how to operate a .303 rifle.

=== Post-production ===
The film's post-production work included editing, sound design, and VFX, which started soon after shooting was over. Bollywood actor Amitabh Bachchan gave his voice-over for the opening sequence of the film. His voice has been added in post-production. It was revealed during an episode of Kaun Banega Crorepati when Farhan Akhtar and his father Javed Akhtar participated as celebrity contestant and requested Amitabh Bachchan to give voice over of opening sequence as a request. The background music has been given by Satish Raghunathan while sound mixing has been done by Pranav Shukla.

=== Film title dispute ===
Even before the release of the film, controversy erupted over the title of the film. Rumblings against the film title were ongoing ever since the film was announced in social media by producers with protests organized by members of the Yadav community in Gurgaon, Haryana. They blocked roads, demanding a change in film title. The protesters wanted the title of the film to be changed to 120 Veer Ahir in order to reflect the contribution of the Yadav community in the 1962 War. The protestors have threatened to expand the agitation after 26 October 2025 if the name was not changed. They demanded that the martyrs should be named, and a tribute should be paid to them at the end of the film, otherwise they will boycott the film. After protests in Haryana and Rajasthan against the title of the film, other demonstrations were organized in Uttar Pradesh on the same lines threatening to stop the release in Uttar Pradesh and Bihar. In August 2025, Ahir Janjagrati Foundation of Rajasthan had sent a legal notice to Farhan Akhtar and others for downplaying the contribution of Ahir Yadav community.

In October 2025, hundreds of protestors in Gurgaon, Bal Kishan Yadav, BJP leader and councillor from Manesar, explaining : "Our community is here today to ensure our valiant efforts are reflected in history instead of being wiped out as is being attempted. The character Farhan Akhtar plays (Major Shaitan Singh) did lead the 100+ Ahirs but our sacrifice should not be forgotten by promoting only the Chauhan community.” A group of ahir yadav leaders in Gurgaon, have threatened to stall the release of the film in Harayana, if the name of the film is not changed to '120 Veer Ahir' and claimed the title is an insult to their martyred. The protestors on 28 October 2025 also blocked the NH-48 with protest march for several hours. Some even demanded the setting up of separate Ahir Regiment. Ahir community members on 9 November 2025 threatened to file FIRs against Farhan Akhtar, if name is not changed. The Ahirs under the banner of Sanyukt Ahir Regiment Morcha have threatened to stop the screening of the film, demanding that the film name must be changed. In a sort of reply to accusations Farhan Akhtar while promoting the film on Aap Ki Adalat revealed the reason, why he named the film 120 Bahadur. The Delhi High Court dismissed an 11th hour PIL filed by the Sanyukt Ahir Regiment Morcha, saying the film distorts historical facts and demanding a change in the film's name. The court further said, if any change or correction is required, it should be done on over-the-top (OTT) release, clearing the film's release as scheduled.

== Marketing ==
The first-look poster of the film was released on 18 November 2024, as a tribute on the 62nd anniversary of the Battle of Rezang La, which is recognised as a legendary battle fought on the freezing heights of Eastern Ladakh. The official teaser of the film was released on 5 August 2025 in Mumbai, where Narpat Singh, the son of Shaitan Singh was also present. An official poster of the film was released a day earlier. The teaser was attached with War 2 in theatres. The trailer was released on 5 November 2025. The trailer was launched by actor Yash at an event. The music album was launched on 6 November 2025 at a gala event at Royal Opera Hotel in Mumbai where all those associated with film including Javed Akhtar and singers were present. As part of marketing campaign the film makers decided to have special paid preview shows for the viewers on 18 November 2025 to commemorate the 63rd anniversary of the Battle of Rezang La. A total of 30 paid preview shows were held across the country on Rezang La Day. The film was also promoted on Aap Ki Adalat. The teaser release function was held at a multiplex in Mumbai, where the teaser was also released on IMAX. The second teaser was released on 28 September 2025 to rave reviews. The teaser released on 96th birth anniversary of Lata Mangeshkar features the song Ae Mere Watan Ke Logon which she had sung live for the film Haqeeqat, also based on the same battle during 1962 war, as a tribute to the fallen soldiers. The filmmakers and distributors have decided to go for limited release strategy in around 900-1000 screens only for its target, the elite audience. In mass-dominated B and C centres, AA Films, the distributors will either skip the release or go for limited shows in single-screen theatres and multiplexes.

== Soundtrack ==
While, the film's soundtrack has been composed by Amit Trivedi, Salim–Sulaiman and Amjad Nadeem Aamir with lyrics written by Javed Akhtar, the entire background score for the film has been composed by Satish Raghunathan. The album was preceded by the first single "Dada Kishan Ki Jai" which released at a launch event held at Lucknow on 25 October 2025. The soundtrack album was launched on 31 October at a launch event held at Royal Opera House in Mumbai, with the involvement of the cast and crew.

== Special stamp ==
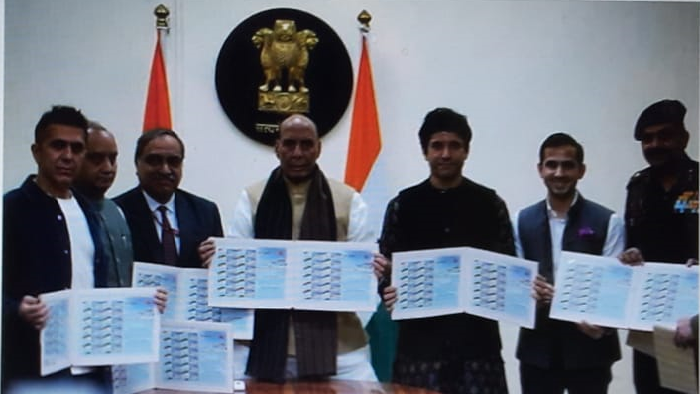
120 Bahadur special stamp released in New Delhi

The makers launched a customised 'My Stamp' to honour the brave soldiers who fought in the Battle of Rezang La during the 1962 India-China war. This special customised 'My Stamp' was unveiled by Defence Minister Rajnath Singh in New Delhi. The special customised stamp has been designed and issued by the Department of Posts. Besides the defense minister, film director Razneesh 'Razy' Ghai, Farhan Akhtar, Jitendra Gupta, Director General Postal Services, Ritesh Sidhwani, Arhan Bagati, and Amit Chandra were also present during the unveiling of the special stamp. The special commemorative stamp based on the Rezang La War Memorial in Ladakh was unveiled on 12 November 2025. The special stamp was released just 6 days before the 63rd anniversary of the legendary battle.

== Release ==
The film was theatrically released in India on 21 November 2025, just 3 days after 63rd anniversary of the battle. The film was Farhan Akhtar's first ever IMAX release as an actor. The film was also screened at the Gala Premiere Section at the 56th International Film Festival of India (IFFI) in Goa on 21 November 2025, on the day of its theatrical release. The film had paid previews on 18 November 2025. The film has become the first film in that will be released simultaneously in over 800 defence theatres across India exclusively for the members of India's defence community. This was enabled by PictureTime's mobile cinema network in collaboration with GenSync Brat Media. The film is being distributed by AA Films. The filmmakers and distributors decided to go for limited release strategy with release in around 900-1000 screens only for its target, the elite audience. In mass-dominated B and C centres, AA Films, the distributors either skipped the release or went for limited shows only in single-screen theatres and multiplexes.

It is the first film ever to be screened at Rezang La War Memorial Auditorium in Chushul village, Ladakh on 22 November 2025 organised by mobile theatre company PictureTime. The screening is to be held at an altitude of 16,452 ft making it the highest-altitude film screening ever attempted. The special screening event featured 14 shows for soldiers stationed in the area as well as local residents. Several schools and residential societies are booking entire shows allowing students and residents to watch the film. The film was declared tax-free in Delhi. The Chief Minister of Delhi Rekha Gupta has issued an order declaring the film tax-free in Delhi from 28 November 2025. The film was also made tax-free in Rajasthan. Producer and actor Farhan Akhtar had hoped the film is made tax-free across India.

The film was released with Indian Sign Language interpretation in 10 cities on 9 August 2026.

== Reception ==
=== Box office ===
The film had an opening day collection ₹ 2.38 crore and total worldwide collection of ₹ 7.06 crore in the opening weekend. Collections after two weeks on third weekend stood at ₹ 20.00 crore.

=== Reviews ===
The film received positive reviews. On the review aggregator website Rotten Tomatoes, 73% of 11 critics' reviews are positive, with an average rating of 5.4/10.

Anuj Kumar of The Hindu gave a positive review of the movie. "...120 Bahadur is a sincere, technically proficient tribute that gives both heart and mind their due on the battlefield. It aligns the beats and the attitude and swagger that are very much of today, without diluting the details of the military manoeuvre in a punishing environment," he wrote. "It may not be a genre-defining epic, but 120 Bahadur deserves your time and attention."

Sana Farzeen of India Today, gives the film a modest 3 out of 5 rating saying "The film is fitting tribute to the martyrs of the Battle of Rezang La, with all actors including Farhan Akhtar, Sparsh Walia, Ankit Siwach, Sahib Verma, and Dhanveer Singh seemingly disappearing into their characters. Cinematography by Tetsuo Nagata is breathtaking. But despite all the hype, lack of cohesiveness between emotional portions and raw battle scenes means '120 Bahadur' never quite climbs to the heights it aims for".

Taher Ahamed of Deccan Herald gave the movie 4 out of 5 stating "the movie is paced well, with a strong on-screen presence combined with exceptional cinematography. It does not go over the top at tugging your heart, but makes the right impact, as you respect and admire the courage of the bravehearts."

Rishabh Suti of Hindustan Times, gives the film a modest 3 out of 5 rating saying "The film pays befitting tribute to the martyrs of the Battle of Rezang La, but lacks emotional connect. Such as a song filmed on Farhan and Raashi's character about their married life, almost feels out of place. The cinematography by Tetsuo Nagata captures Ladakh's harsh terrain with striking clarity, is a strong point in the first half; but the war sequence in second half is where film peaks. Farhan Akhtar does justice but the sauveness associated with him keeps all reminding Farhan is acting a character. Sparsh Walia as the radio operator, and Raashii Khanna do justice to their roles. But a tighter screenplay was needed."

Jaya Dwivedie of India TV said, "120 Bahadur is a film that salutes bravery, celebrates their sacrifices and brings the famous battle to big screen, but lacks emotion and cinematic intensity. The visuals are superb, but no emotional connect. Yet the film must be seen, as it reminds us how heroes stand on the border, not on screen."

== See also ==
- 1962: The War in the Hills – 2021 Indian web series by Mahesh Manjrekar
- Haqeeqat – 1964 Hindi film on same battle
- Sino-Indian war – 1962 war between China and India
