= King (singer) =

Indian singer and rapper (born 1995)

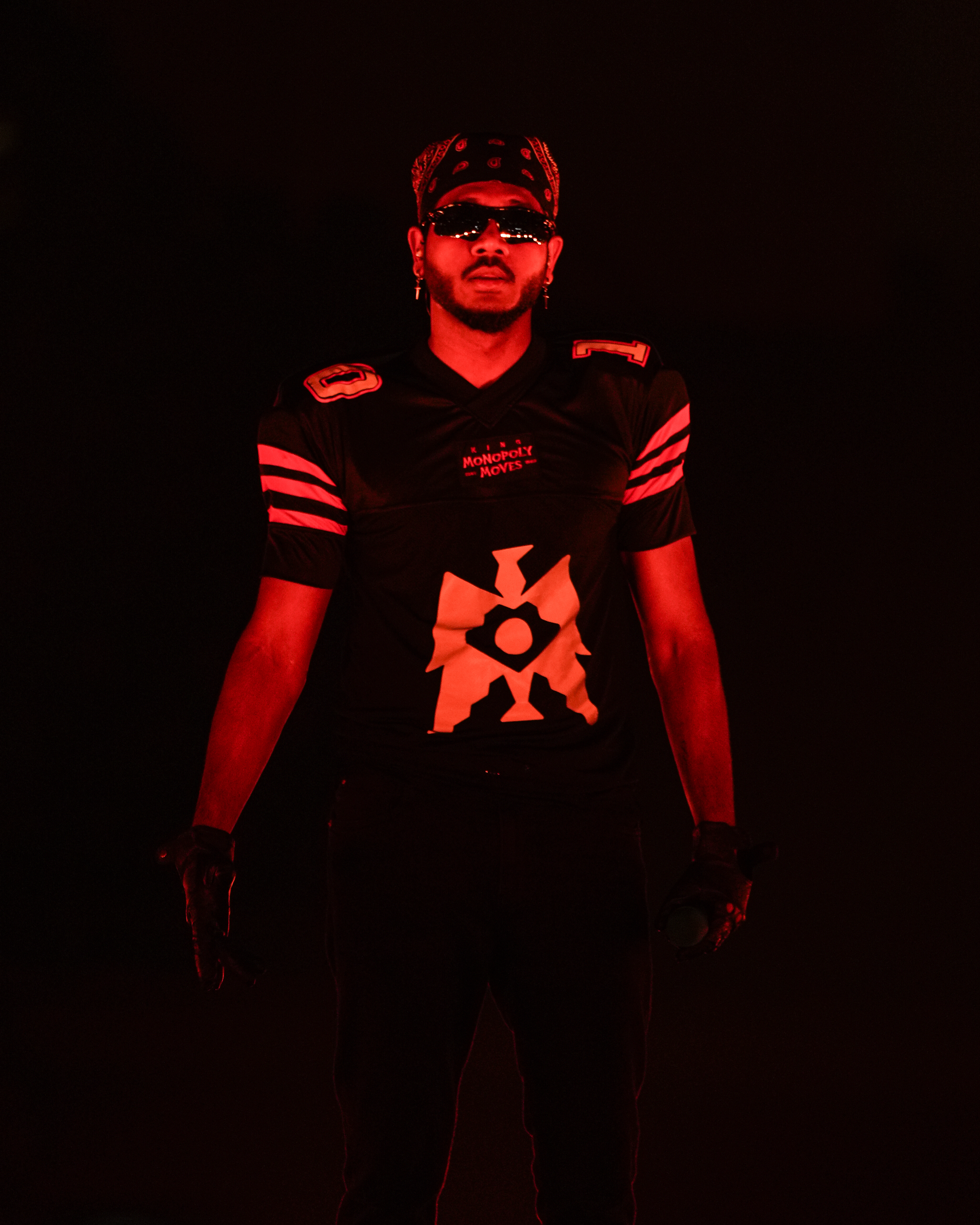
- King at Monopoly Moves Tour 2024

Background information
- Also known as: King Rocco
- Born: Arpan Kumar Chandel; 10 October 1995 (age 31); Uttar Pradesh, India
- Genres: Rap, Indie, Pop, Hip hop
- Occupations: Artist, performer, storyteller
- Instruments: Vocals, guitar
- Years active: 2018–present
- Label: Warner Music India

Arpan Kumar Chandel (born 10 October 1995), known professionally as King or King Rocco, is an Indian singer-songwriter, rapper, and music producer. In 2019, he rose to fame as a finalist on the MTV India reality show MTV Hustle. He is best known for his singles "Ghumshudaa" (2019), "Tu Aake Dekhle" (2020), "Oops" (2022), "Pablo" (2022) and "Maan Meri Jaan" (2022). "Maan Meri Jaan" achieved widespread commercial success, becoming the most streamed song of 2023 on Spotify India, and other music streaming platforms.

== Early life ==
Arpan was born on 10 October 1995 in Uttar Pradesh, India. He attended a government school for his early education before enrolling in Vinay Marg Navyug Secondary School in New Delhi. He later gained admission to Dyal Singh College through the sports quota to pursue a Bachelor of Arts degree.

Arpan played for the national under-20 team for four years during his time in college. Despite his athletic achievements, he eventually dropped out to focus on his passion for rapping.

King began sharing his music online through his YouTube channel, "King Rocco," which he launched in 2012. He continued to upload his music to various social media platforms while in school. In an interview with NME, he cited early musical influences including pop groups like the Backstreet Boys and Vengaboys.

== Career ==
=== 2018–2020: Career beginnings, MTV Hustle and debut album ===
King began his professional career in early 2018, dropping his first EP Talismann, which included 7 tracks (as per his ReverbNation release, the EP originally included 6 songs). He released the Mashhoor Chapter 1 in 2019, which included 10 tracks and subsequently, participated in the inaugural season of the rap reality show MTV Hustle, where he was judged by Raftaar, Raja Kumari, and Nucleya. He rose to fame as a finalist on the show in 2019.

Following MTV Hustle, King released 2 of the lead singles from his subsequent fourth studio album New Life, namely, "Tum Saath Rehnaa" and "No Loss", but due to the COVID-19 outbreak, he couldn't proceed with the album rollout and instead, announced a limited edition mixtape Heartbreak Made Me Do It. It released in April 2020, comprising eight tracks. Over 500 digital copies were sold, and a half of the funds raised by the album sales were donated to the PMCARES fund.

King finally released his debut album, The Carnival, on September 21, 2020. The album featured the sleeper hit "Tu Aake Dekhle", which became his first breakthrough and garnered significant attention, becoming one of his signature tracks and a chart-topping hit.

=== 2021–2023: "Maan Meri Jaan", and subsequent projects ===
He followed this with his second album, The Gorilla Bounce, in 2021.

In 2022, King made his major-label debut with his Khwabeeda EP, which featured tracks like "Baazi", "Ektarfa", and "Sinner" and was his first release with Warner Music India. Later that year, he released his album, Champagne Talk which consisted of singles like "Pablo", "Oops" and "Maan Meri Jaan", which went on to become the most streamed song on Spotify, Apple Music, and Shazam in India in 2023. He subsequently released multiple versions of "Maan Meri Jaan" featuring artists from different language backgrounds, including a Hindi-English version titled "Maan Meri Jaan (Afterlife)" with Nick Jonas. "Maan Meri Jaan" was also featured in Spotify’s Top 50 Viral Charts in 2023. He made his debut in Bollywood with the song "Sahi Galat" from the film Drishyam 2 in 2022. In the same year, he also appeared on The Kapil Sharma Show, as a guest, alongside rappers Raftaar, Badshah, Raja Kumari and Ikka.

In April 2023, King partnered with Indian entrepreneur and podcaster Raj Shamani and his company, House of X, to launch his debut perfume brand, Blanko.

In 2023, King released a three-track EP titled Shayad Woh Sune, which included songs such as "Laapata" and "Teri Ho Na Saki".

=== 2024–present: New Life, collaborations and Cannes debut ===
Following the EP's release, he launched his long-awaited fourth studio album, New Life, featuring collaborations with international artists, such as Gucci Mane and Julia Michaels. Tracks such as "Crown", "Good Trip", and "Sarkaare" from the album garnered critical acclaim, with "Good Trip" being featured in the Grammy Recording Academy’s Global Spin series. Additionally, his song "We Are The Ones" was included in the official soundtrack for the video game EA Sports FC 24. He performed a 9-city tour across India in support of his album New Life. The tour included performances in Bengaluru, Jaipur, Hyderabad, Delhi NCR, Mumbai, and Goa, among other cities.

In the same year, Sony India appointed King as the brand ambassador for its audio product category. He was also shortlisted as one of GQ India’s 35 Most Influential Young Indians and performed at the closing ceremony of the Indian Premier League Final at the Narendra Modi Stadium in Ahmedabad.

In 2024, King released his fifth studio album, Monopoly Moves, featuring collaborations with Indian rappers like MC STΔN, Ikka, Seedhe Maut, Yashraj and Raftaar. The songs "GOAT SHIT" featuring Karma, "F*CK WHAT THEY SAY" featuring MC STΔN, and "KODAK" featuring Seedhe Maut, garnered significant attention, particularly due to the performance of the featuring artists on the tracks. King also became embroiled in a feud with rapper Emiway Bantai due to his song "F*CK WHAT THEY SAY" containing subtle jabs at the rapper. His comments during his appearance on the podcast Prakhar Ki Pravachan further fueled the beef, prompting Emiway to respond with a track titled, "ROKO 2MG". King further released two tracks exclusively on Instagram, "Mere Pyaare Emiway" and "Hum Teri Lele", and Emiway responded with "Meet the Instagram Yapper" and "Dependent Kauve".

He also released the single "Bumpa" with Jason Derulo in the same year, as well as his long-awaited collaboration "Aawara" with American producer KSHMR and Indian singer Zaeden. King partnered with Red Bull to release "Shining Star," which served as the official anthem for the Red Bull Dance Your Style World Final 2024.

In the same year, King attended the 77th Cannes Film Festival as part of the Brut India delegation, becoming the first Indian pop artist to walk the red carpet at the event. He was later featured in the Forbes 30 Under 30 Asia list in the Entertainment & Sports category. In April 2024, he appeared on the cover of Rolling Stone India as part of their Future of Music ‘24 list.

In November 2025, he released the single "Kamaal Hai", accompanied by a music video featuring actress Sahher Bambba and veteran actor Lilliput. The track was the first lead single from his upcoming sixth studio album, Raja Hindustani. In January 2026, he released the track, "Jo Ishq Hua", the second lead single from the album. The music video featured the actress Shriya Pilgaonkar and King himself. At the end of the music video, King announced the release date of February 20, 2026 for the album. The album features guest appearances from veteran Bollywood playback singers, including Sunidhi Chauhan, Kumar Sanu, Shreya Ghoshal, Shaan and Rekha Bhardwaj.

In May 2026, he starred in the action-drama web-series Lukkhe, alongside Raashii Khanna, Palak Tiwari, Shivankit Singh Parihar, Yograj Singh and Lakshvir Singh Saran. He also contributed to the four tracks from the soundtrack of the series. He is set to perform as a part of the lineup at the inaugural international edition of Hybe Weverse Con Festival in India in 2027.

== Discography ==
=== Albums and mixtapes ===
Year	Album	Track	Artist(s)	Producer(s)	Ref.
2018	Talismann	Dur Kyun	King	Ryini Beats	
2018	Talismann	FLEX	King	Young Taylor	
2018	Talismann	Main Ho Gaya Tera	King	LCS	
2018	Talismann	Hennessy	King	Lytton Scott	
2018	Talismann	Talismann	King	Lytton Scott	
2018	Talismann	Hum Bekhudi Mein	King	Tundra beats	
2018	Talismann	Taaliyaan	King	Gum$	
2019	Mashhoor Chapter 1	"Maahaul"	King	Kane Beats	
2019	Mashhoor Chapter 1	"Fantasy"	King	King	
2019	Mashhoor Chapter 1	"Umar 73"	King	Eibyondatrack (Jumpan), King	
2019	Mashhoor Chapter 1	"Akeli Awara Azaad"	King	King	
2019	Mashhoor Chapter 1	"Ghumshudha"	King	King	
2019	Mashhoor Chapter 1	"I Know You"	King	King	
2019	Mashhoor Chapter 1	"Going Bad"	King	Josh Petruccio, King	
2019	Mashhoor Chapter 1	"Outta My Mind"	King	A.T.O	
2020	The Carnival	"She Don't Give A"	King	Satyam HCR	
2020	The Carnival	"Thoda Samjha Karo"	King	Satyam HCR	
2020	The Carnival	"Dracula"	King	Yokimuzic	
2020	The Carnival	"90s"	King	Shahbeats	
2020	The Carnival	"MAFIIA"	King	Dev	
2020	The Carnival	"Let The Eyes Talk"	King	Shahbeats	
2020	The Carnival	"IICONIC"	King	Auhm	
2020	The Carnival	"Tu Aake Dekhle"	King	Shahbeats	
2020	Heartbreak Made Me Do It (Limited Edition)	Mood	King	Lucas	
2020	Heartbreak Made Me Do It (Limited Edition)	Tere Naam Pe	King		
2020	Heartbreak Made Me Do It (Limited Edition)	Fosure	King		
2020	Heartbreak Made Me Do It (Limited Edition)	Banjarr	King	Tundra Beats	
2020	Heartbreak Made Me Do It (Limited Edition)	Dur Kyunn	King	Ryini Beat	
2020	Heartbreak Made Me Do It (Limited Edition)	Aarzoo	King		
2020	Heartbreak Made Me Do It (Limited Edition)	Mirza Aur Ghalib	King		
2020	Heartbreak Made Me Do It (Limited Edition)	Obsession	King		
2021	The Gorilla Bounce	"Picasso"	King	Section 8	
2021	The Gorilla Bounce	"Blanko"	King	Section 8	
2021	The Gorilla Bounce	"Saloot"	King	Section 8	
2021	The Gorilla Bounce	"Godfather"	King	Section 8	
2021	The Gorilla Bounce	"Casanova"	King, Rahul Sathu	Rahul Sathu	
2021	The Gorilla Bounce	"Desi Dan Bilzerian"	King	Section 8	
2021	The Gorilla Bounce	"Koo Koo"	King, Aesap, Jaz	Dev	
2021	The Gorilla Bounce	"Shaamein"	King, Harjas Harjaayi	Sshiv	
2021	The Gorilla Bounce	"Main Bas Kehti Nahi"	King	Section 8	
2021	The Gorilla Bounce	"ERA"	King	Section 8	
2021	The Gorilla Bounce	"Tera Hua Na Main Kabhi"	King, HIGHBORN	Section 8	
2022	Champagne Talk	Na Ja Tu	King	Aakash	
2022	Champagne Talk	OOPS	King	Hiten, Section 8	
2022	Champagne Talk	Broken Dreams	King	Aakash	
2022	Champagne Talk	Maan Meri Jaan	King	Saurabh Lokhande	
2022	Champagne Talk	Dejalo	King	Aakash	
2022	Champagne Talk	Pablo	King	NDS, Section 8	
2022	Champagne Talk	Champagne Talk	King	Saurabh Lokhande	
2022	Champagne Talk	Me & Me	King	NDS, Section 8	
2023	New Life	Aafat	King	Karan Kanchan, Section 8	
2023	New Life	Runaway	King, Julia Michaels	David Arkwright	
2023	New Life	Tu Jaana Na Piya	King	David Arkwright	
2023	New Life	Good Trip	King	David Arkwright	
2023	New Life	Sarkaare	King	Alan Sampson	
2023	New Life	Tum Saath Rehnaa	King	Riz Shain	
2023	New Life	Legends	King	Karan Kanchan	
2023	New Life	We Are the Ones	King, Gucci Mane	David Arkwright	
2023	New Life	High Hukku	King, Nikhita Gandhi	Aditya Dev	
2023	New Life	No Loss	King	Ayo Shree, Section 8	
2023	New Life	CROWN	King, Natania	David Arkwright	
2023	New Life	Legends (B Side)	King	David Arkwright	
2024	Monopoly Moves	GOAT SHIT	King, Karma	UKato	
2024	Monopoly Moves	STILL THE SAME	King, Abhijay Sharma	Abhijay Sharma	
2024	Monopoly Moves	WAY BIGGER	King	Jaz	
2024	Monopoly Moves	BAWE MAIN CHECK	King, Raga	UKato	
2024	Monopoly Moves	MISFIT	King	UKato	
2024	Monopoly Moves	KODAK	King, Seedhe Maut	UKato	
2024	Monopoly Moves	SAZA	King, MC Heam	Exult Yowl	
2024	Monopoly Moves	PYAAR HUMARA	King	Bharg	
2024	Monopoly Moves	F*CK WHAT THEY SAY	King, MC STΔN	Riz Shain	
2024	Monopoly Moves	WARCRY	King, Raftaar	Riz Shain	
2024	Monopoly Moves	MASHINEY	King, Ikka	UKato	
2024	Monopoly Moves	SUPREME LEADER	King, Talhah Yunus	UKato	
2024	Monopoly Moves	SUITS & STREETS	King, Yashraj, Gravity	Abhijay Sharma	
2024	Monopoly Moves	CAN'T AFFORD	King, Sikander Kahlon	UKato	
2024	Monopoly Moves	TERE HO KE	King, Bella	UKato	
2024	Monopoly Moves	DELULU DANCE	King	Bharg	
2026	Raja Hindustani	Kamaal Hai	King	Aditya Dev	
2026	Raja Hindustani	Jo Ishq Hua	King	Aditya Dev	
2026	Raja Hindustani	Maza Pyaar Karne Mein	King, Kumar Sanu	Aditya Dev	
2026	Raja Hindustani	Ye Dil Mujhko Tu Dede	King, Sunidhi Chauhan	Mir Desai	
2026	Raja Hindustani	Yeh Safar	King, Shaan	Aditya Pushkarna	
2026	Raja Hindustani	Haal e Dil	King, Shreya Ghoshal	NEVERSOBER	
2026	Raja Hindustani	Woh Pehla Akshar	King, Rekha Bhardwaj	Bharg	
2026	Raja Hindustani	Aahista Aahista	King	Mir Desai	

=== Extended plays ===
Year	EPs/Mixtapes	Track	Artist(s)	Producer(s)	Ref.
2022	Khwabeeda	Baazi	King	Section 8	
2022	Khwabeeda	Ektarfa	King	Aakash	
2022	Khwabeeda	Sinner	King	ENZO	
2023	Shayad Woh Sune	Laapata	King	Bharg	
2023	Shayad Woh Sune	Hum Tumse	King	Bharg	
2023	Shayad Woh Sune	Teri Ho Na Saki	King	Bharg	
2025	Shayad Koi Na Sune	Yeh Zindagi Hai	King	Bharg	
2025	Shayad Koi Na Sune	Sab Be Asar	King	Ukato	
2025	Shayad Koi Na Sune	Speak Softly	King	Aditya Pushkarna	

=== Singles and collaborations ===
Year	Track	Co-artist(s)	Ref.
2015	Boombass	–	
2016	Zinnda	–	
2017	Hitman	–	
2017	Promise	–	
2018	Chorus	–	
2018	Hauley	–	
2019	Gold Digger	–	
2019	Moment Hah	–	
2020	Jaane De Yaara	Rahul Sathu	
2020	Let There Be Love (Remix)	Ananya Birla, Rahul Sathu	
2021	Keh Na Paun	Void	
2021	Famous	Arjun Kanungo	
2021	Father Saab	Amit Bhadana	
2021	Gangster	Karma	
2021	Ishq Samundar	Arjun Kanungo	
2021	Dhoondein Sitare	Aastha Gill	
2022	Ilzaam	Arjun Kanungo	
2022	Habibi (Remix)	Ricky Rich	
2022	Doob Ja	Sunidhi Chauhan, Salim-Sulaiman	
2022	OOPS (Remix)	Masked Wolf	
2022	Naya Nazariya	–	
2023	Maan Meri Jaan (African Version)	Rayvanny	
2023	Maan Meri Jaan (Afterlife)	Nick Jonas	
2023	Sona Re	–	
2024	Rang Barse x Yaaron Wali Baat	Karan Kanchan, Shiv-Hari	
2024	Aawara	KSHMR, Zaeden	
2024	Bumpa	Jason Derulo	
2024	Mr. K	–	
2024	Shining Star	–	
2024	Alpha's Goodbye	–	
2025	Pray	Ikka, Hiten	
2025	Stay	–	
2025	Till The End	–	
2025	Story of a Bird	Alan Walker	
2025	Quote That	Sanjith Hegde	

=== MTV Hustle Season 1 songs ===
King was the first artist in the show MTV Hustle who entered the Top 15 by performing his track "Maahaul".

Week	Track	Ref.
I- Audition	Maahaul (Hustle Version)	
II- Showcase	Ghumshudaa (Hustle Version)	
III	Aye Jaani	
IV- Bollywood Remix	She Move It Like (Remix)	
V	Usool	
VI	Gold Digger (Hustle Version)	
VII	Memories	
VIII	Moment Hai (Hustle Version)	
Semi-finals	Hennessy (Hustle Version)	
Grand Finale	Badnaam Raja	

=== Soundtracks ===
Year	Song	Film/Series	Composer(s)	Lyricists	Co-artist(s)	Ref.
2022	"Sahi Galat"	Drishyam 2	Devi Sri Prasad	Amitabh Bhattacharya	–	
2023	"Mere Sawaal Ka"	Shehzada	Pritam	Shloke Lal	–	
2023	"Baap Aa Gaya Hai"	Rana Naidu	Karan Kanchan	King, Roll Rida	Roll Rida	
2023	"O Bandeya"	Farrey	Sachin-Jigar	Jigar Saraiya	–	
2025	"Cyclone"	Kesari Chapter 2	Shashwat Sachdev, King		–	
2026	"Bulletproof"	Lukkhe	King, Karan Kanchan, Amira Gill, Manreet Khara, UKato	King, Manreet Khara	Amira Gill, Manreet Khara	
