= 120 Bahadur (soundtrack) =

Soundtrack album by Amit Trivedi, Salim–Sulaiman and Amjad Nadeem Aamir
- Released: 31 October 2025
- Recorded: 2024–2025
- Genre: Feature film soundtrack
- Length: 15:38
- Language: Hindi
- Label: Zee Music Company
External audio
- Official Audio Jukebox on YouTube

Singles from 120 Bahadur
- 1. "Dada Kishan Ki Jai" Released: 25 October 2025

120 Bahadur is the soundtrack album to the 2025 Hindi-language historical war film of the same name directed by Razneesh Ghai and produced by Excel Entertainment and Trigger Happy Studios, starring Farhan Akhtar, Raashii Khanna, Vivan Bhatena and Ankit Siwach. The soundtrack to the film featured four songs composed by Amit Trivedi, Salim–Sulaiman and Amjad Nadeem Aamir with lyrics written by Javed Akhtar. The soundtrack was preceded by a single "Dada Kishan Ki Jai" which released on 25 October 2025, and the full album was released through Zee Music Company on 31 October 2025. The film marks the final collaboration between the record label and Excel Entertainment to date, signaling the end of a ten-year audio rights deal.

== Background ==
The film's soundtrack is composed by Amit Trivedi, while the background score is composed by Satish Raghunathan. Salim–Sulaiman and Amjad Nadeem Aamir served as guest composers, contributing one song each. 120 Bahadur is Trivedi's maiden collaboration with Excel Entertainment. The score accompanied the emotional undertones as it reflected the incidents of the 120 soldiers who participated in the Battle of Rezang La. Javed Akhtar wrote lyrics for all the songs.

== Release ==
The soundtrack was preceded with the first single, "Dada Kishan Ki Jai" composed by Salim–Sulaiman and performed by Sukhwinder Singh. It was released at a launch event held in Lucknow on 25 October 2025. The album was released at a music launch event held at Royal Opera House in Mumbai on 31 October, with the attendance of the cast and crew and all the songs were performed live at the event.

== Reception ==
Critics based at Bollywood Hungama wrote "Songs – 'Yaad Aate Hain', 'Main Hoon Woh Dharti Maa' and 'Naina Re Lobhi' – fail to entice or move the viewers. Satish Raghunathan's background score is heroic." The Free Press Journal wrote "the music and songs fail to light up patriotism and the ‘josh’ and ‘junoon’ that is required of a film of this nature and stature [...] Tracks like ‘Yaad Aate Hain' and 'Main Hoon Woh Dharti Maa' seem like an amateur attempt to recreate the magic of cult and evergreen patriotic tracks like ‘Sandese Aate Hain’ and others... The film’s background music (Satish Raghunathan) is taut and syncs with the narrative." Mayur Sanap of Rediff.com wrote "The plaintive music adds to the sombre mood and heightens the emotion." Nandini Ramnath of Scroll.in found the songs to be "forgettable". Renuka Vyavahare of The Times of India wrote "The music too is disappointingly flat — you can’t help but recall every rousing Border track that might have elevated the drama here."

== Track listing ==
No.	Title	Music	Singer(s)	Length
1.	"Yaad Aate Hain"	Amit Trivedi	Subhadeep Das Chowdhury, Chirag Kotwal, Obom Tangu, Utkarsh Wankhede	3:24
2.	"Dada Kishan Ki Jai"	Salim–Sulaiman	Sukhwinder Singh	4:01
3.	"Naine Ra Lobhi"	Amjad Nadeem Aamir	Javed Ali, Asees Kaur	3:20
4.	"Main Hoon Woh Dharti Maa"	Amit Trivedi	Shreya Ghoshal	4:53
Total length:				15:38

== Personnel ==
Credits adapted from Zee Music Company:

- Music composers: Amit Trivedi, Salim–Sulaiman, Amjad Nadeem Aamir
- Score composer: Satish Ragunathan
- Lyricist: Javed Akhtar
- Singers: Subhadeep Das Chowdhury, Chirag Kotwal, Obom Tangu, Utkarsh Wankhede, Sukhwinder Singh, Javed Ali, Asees Kaur, Shreya Ghoshal
- Music producers: Amit Trivedi, Raja Rasaily, Salim–Sulaiman, Raj Pandit, Aamir Khan
- Music arrangements: Amit Trivedi, Raja Rasaily
- Studios: AT Studios, New Edge Studios, Blue Productions, Headroom Studio, Amjad Nadeem Aamir Studio, Krishna Audio
- Recording engineers: Chinmay Mestry, Abhishek Vishnu Dandekar, Raj Pandit, Tejus Srivastava, Amal Krishnan, Aamir Shaikh
- Mixing and mastering: Shadab Rayeen, Aftab Khan, Prithvi Sharma
- Mixing assistance: Jazbaat, Prasad, Sohamm, Rupam, Suryansh, Vatsal Chevli, Tejus Srivastava

Musicians

- Vocals: Rishikesh Kamerkar, Arun Kamath, Dean Sequeira, Shrikant Krishna, Latesh Puujari, Deepti Rege, Darshana Menon, Megha Bhardwaj, Shudhi Ramani, Sanchita Pradhan, Raj Pandit, Rajiv Sundaresan
- Guitar: Ishan Das
- Live guitar: Indrajit Chetia
- Snare drum: Darshan Doshi
- Mandolin: Akhtar Ahsan
- Tabla: Sanjeev Sen, Manoj Bhati
- Harmonium: Liyakat Ajmeri
- Dholak: Raju Sardar, Feroz Khan, Mushtaq Khan, Arun Mohite
- Live dhol: Zaid Mohammad, Arun Mohite
- Live rhythm: Raju Sardar
- Live percussion: Raju Sardar, Feroz Khan
- Live strings: Budapest Art Orchestra
- Live strings orchestration: Japjisingh Valecha, Neel Rupareliya
- Orchestra: FAME’S Skopje Studio Orchestra
- Orchestra conductor: Oleg Kondratenko, Arber Curri
- Sound recordist: Dragisa Stojanov
- Pro tools operator: Marina Lefkova
- Stage managers: Riste Trajkovski, Ilija Grkovski, Filip Popov
- Orchestral arrangement: Raja Rasaily
- Orchestra recording supervisor: Neelesh Mandalapu
- Copyists: Neelesh Mandalapu, Kostas Vaporidis
- Orchestra Coordinator: Joshua Rodrigues – Bohemia Junction Limited
