= Lukkhe =

2026 Indian streaming television series

- Genre: Crime drama; Thriller
- Created by: Debojit Das Purkayastha; Agrim Joshi
- Written by: Debojit Das Purkayastha; Agrim Joshi
- Directed by: Himank Gaur
- Starring: Lakshvir Singh Saran; King; Raashii Khanna; Palak Tiwari; Shivankit Singh Parihar
- Composers: King; Bharg Kale; Karan Kanchan
- Country of origin: India
- Original language: Hindi
- No. of seasons: 1
- No. of episodes: 8

Production
- Executive producers: Vishal Bajaj; Pratik Nandkumar More; Debojit Das Purkayastha; Agrim Joshi
- Producers: Rajesh Bahl; Vipul Amrutlal Shah
- Cinematography: Parv Dandona
- Production company: optimystix

Original release
- Network: Amazon Prime Video

Lukkhe is a 2026 Indian Hindi-language crime drama streaming television series created by Debojit Das Purkayastha and Agrim Joshi for the streaming platform Amazon Prime Video. Directed by Himank Gaur, the series stars Lakshvir Singh Saran, alongside the acting debut of singer-songwriter King (Arpan Kumar Chandel), Raashii Khanna, and Palak Tiwari. Set in Chandigarh, the narrative explores the intersections of the underground Punjabi hip hop industry, drug addiction, and organized crime networks. All eight episodes of the first season premiered concurrently on 7 May 2026.

== Synopsis ==
The series follows Lucky, a promising hockey player who enters a rehabilitation centre following a severe accident stemming from substance abuse involving a synthetic narcotic named "Demon". While in recovery, he forms a relationship with another patient, Sanober. Upon release, Lucky discovers that Sanober's brother is Nihal Singh, known professionally as the underground hip-hop artist MC Badnaam, who utilizes his music operations to mask a narcotics distribution network.

Concurrently, Inspector Gurbani, a dedicated police officer investigating the spread of the drug cartel in Chandigarh, recruits Lucky to act as an undercover informant. The central plot details Lucky's infiltration of Badnaam's inner circle, which is further complicated by an ongoing, violent professional rivalry between Badnaam and a competing rapper, OG.

== Cast and characters ==
- Lakshvir Singh Saran as Lucky
- King as Nihal Singh / MC Badnaam
- Raashii Khanna as Inspector Gurbani Kaur
- Palak Tiwari as Sanober
- Shivankit Singh Parihar as OG
- Yograj Singh
- Nakul Roshan Sahdev
- Kritika Bharadwaj as Padmini Sodhi

== Controversy ==
Following the release of the series, a FIR was registered in Chandigarh against actor Yograj Singh. The complaint, filed by a legal advocate, alleged that Singh's character delivered derogatory and anti-women remarks within the dialogue of the show. The Punjab State Commission for Women subsequently directed local police authorities to investigate the matter and submit an action taken report.

== Release and reception ==
The first season consisting of eight episodes was made available globally on Amazon Prime Video on 7 May 2026.

=== Critical reception ===
Writing for The Hollywood Reporter India, Rahul Desai called the series a "middling musical drama" that begins with a promising setup before lapsing into established subgenre clichés. However, Mehrotra highly commended the show's flamboyancy and visual craft, noting that the action sequences were kinetically choreographed and edited.

Trisha Gaur of Koimoi rated the series 2 out of 5 stars, stating that while the underlying premise of drug peddling in Punjab had potential, the narrative "turns into chaos in the finale." Gaur found the pacing sluggish and argued that the casting of the main characters felt mismatched for the dark atmosphere of the story.

Udita Jhunjhunwala of Scroll.in described the show as "overly ambitious" and overstuffed with tropes like corrupt police officers and comedic hitmen. Jhunjhunwala felt that the heavy focus on staging lengthy rap sequences occasionally diluted the plot's narrative urgency, though she credited the series for its sincerity regarding "biological ties and found family." A review by Moneycontrol echoed these criticisms, noting that coincidences did heavy lifting in the plot and that the overall tone felt "oddly polished" and sanitized, which stripped away the raw grit expected from an addiction-centric crime thriller. The reviewer did, however, praise Lakshvir Singh Saran for keeping his portrayal grounded and avoiding unnecessary flair.

Shubhra Gupta of The Indian Express characterized the series as erratic but engaging, observing that "when Lukkhe sticks to its own voice... it flies." Gupta praised the performances of the supporting cast, particularly Nakul Roshan Sahdev and Kritika Bharadwaj, as well as King's acting debut. Conversely, she criticized the writing for treating weightier themes like same-sex love and masculinity as mere afterthoughts, and noted that the Chandigarh setting often felt unconvincing and restricted to artificial sets.
