= Rudra: The Edge of Darkness =

Indian crime drama television series

- Genre: Crime drama; Psychological thriller; Serial drama
- Based on: Luther by Neil Cross
- Written by: Ishan Trivedi; Abbas Dalal; Hussain Dalal
- Directed by: Rajesh Mapuskar
- Starring: Ajay Devgn; Raashii Khanna; Esha Deol; Atul Kulkarni; Ashwini Kalsekar; Ashish Vidyarthi
- Music by: Siddharth Pandit; Japjisingh Valecha
- Country of origin: India
- Original language: Hindi
- No. of seasons: 1
- No. of episodes: 6

Production
- Producer: Sameer Nair
- Production location: India
- Cinematography: Sanjay K. Memane
- Editor: Antara Lahiri
- Production companies: BBC Studios India; Applause Entertainment

Original release
- Network: Disney+ Hotstar
- Release: 4 March 2022

Related
- Luther

Rudra: The Edge of Darkness is a 2022 Indian psychological crime thriller television series, created for Disney+ Hotstar. It is a remake of British series Luther. Directed by Rajesh Mapuskar, it stars Ajay Devgn, Raashii Khanna and Esha Deol. It received mostly positive reviews with praise directed towards Devgn and Khanna's performance, Mapuskar’s direction, visual style and cinematography.

== Premise ==
DCP Rudraveer Pratap Singh "Rudra" (Ajay Devgn) is pursuing a suspect who ends up in a comatose state in the hospital. After an inquiry into what happened, he is reinstated in the force.

The time apart has taken its toll on him. His investigations lead him to cross into Aliyah Choksi (Raashii Khanna), who is a psychologically affected doctor and killer. She was suspected of double murder.

== Cast ==
- Ajay Devgn as DCP Rudraveer "Rudra" Pratap Singh
- Raashii Khanna as Dr. Aliyah Choksi
- Esha Deol as Shaila "Shai" Durrani Singh
- Atul Kulkarni as DCP Gautam Navlakha
- Ashwini Kalsekar as Jt. CP Deepali Handa
- Tarun Gahlot as P.I. Prabal Thakur
- Satyadeep Misra as Rajiv Dattani
- Ashish Vidyarthi as Jt. CP Raman Acharya
- Rajiv Kachroo as Mandar Naik
- Rajan Kapoor as Sandeep Choksi
- Simran Gangwani as Deepa Choksi
- Milind Gunaji as Colonel Yashwant Nikose
- Vikram Singh Chauhan as Captain Ashok Nikose
- K. C. Shankar as Siddheshwar Kumar
- Chandresh Singh as Inspector Kamlesh Pandey
- Amaara Sangam as Shehnaz Daruwala
- Ria Sadhwani as Aatishi Gidwani
- Hemant Kher as Mahesh Dubey
- Priyanka Setia as Rashmi Dubey
- Abhishek Patel as Rajendra Shukla
- Khushi Rathode as Monica Dhar
- Siya Mahajan as Sakshi Khanna
- Meghana Kaushik as Pooja Shastri
- Luke Kenny as JK Lamba
- Serene Walia as Sara Lamba
- Devesh Chobe as Harry Pathak
- Vikram Sahu as Gopal Pathak
- Jaideep Singh as Jatin Shastri
- Suparna Moitra as Ashmaki Shastri
- Amit Koushik as Zaheer Sheikh
- Rajesh Jais as Commissioner
- Saad Chaudhary as SCU Officer
- Vanita Harihaaran as SCU Officer Vanita
- Swapnil Ajgaonkar as SCU Officer Uttam
- Ankit Singh as SCU Officer
- Rajat Sharma as SCU Officer
- Deepak Rajawat as SCU Officer
- Vishwanath Kulkarni as Inspector Shivaji Memane
- Vipul Deshpande as Inspector At Rajiv's House

== Episodes ==
Season	Episodes	Originally released
1	6	March 4, 2022

No. overall	No. in season	Title	Directed by	Written by	Original release date
1	1	"Genius ki Aukaat"	Rajesh Mapuskar	Ishan Trivedi, Abbas Dalal, Hussain Dalal	4 March 2022
DCP Rudra returns to active duty following an incident with a paedophile and gets a case of a perfect double murder of a prodigy's parents. But not all is as it seems.
2	2	"100 Killer"	Rajesh Mapuskar	Ishan Trivedi, Abbas Dalal, Hussain Dalal	4 March 2022
A maniac goes on a rampage against Mumbai Police, killing uniformed cops. The only thing Rudra can do to get to him is to make himself the killer's target.
3	3	"Bali Ka Bakra"	Rajesh Mapuskar	Ishan Trivedi, Abbas Dalal, Hussain Dalal	4 March 2022
Rudra gets to revisit a previous case when a cult leader suspected of murder becomes active after ten years, kidnapping and killing women to drain their blood.
4	4	"Weak Spot"	Rajesh Mapuskar	Ishan Trivedi, Abbas Dalal, Hussain Dalal	4 March 2022
A serial killer is on the loose, killing young women and leaving behind a peculiar crime scene. Meanwhile, Rudra's past catches up threatening his investigation and career.
5	5	"Zabaan Ka Pakka"	Rajesh Mapuskar	Ishan Trivedi, Abbas Dalal, Hussain Dalal	4 March 2022
When the wife of a wealthy businessman is taken hostage and Rudra tries to solve this case, something else comes to light that shakes the ground beneath his feet.
6	6	"Tod Fod"	Rajesh Mapuskar	Ishan Trivedi, Abbas Dalal, Hussain Dalal	4 March 2022
Framed for his wife's murder, Rudra is on the run while chasing the real murderer. As he becomes the target of the entire police force, he seeks help from an unlikely source.

== Production ==
In April 2019, Applause Entertainment acquired the rights to remake the hit BBC One's drama series Luther. In April 2021, Disney+ Hotstar formally announced the show attaching Devgn to star in the lead role with Applause Entertainment and BBC Studios India producing.

=== Casting ===
In April 2021, reports came in stating that Ajay Devgn will star in the Indian adaptation and the same was confirmed later that month with the series order from Disney+ Hotstar. In July 2021, Esha Deol was cast as the female lead. Later that month, Raashii Khanna joined for a prominent lead role, then Atul Kulkarni, Ashwini Kalsekar and Ashish Vidyarthi joined the cast. In January 2022, Satyadeep Mishra and Tarun Gahlot were confirmed to be cast in main roles.

== Release ==
The six episode first season premiered on 4 March 2022 on Disney+ Hotstar. In US, the show will be available on Hulu as part of distribution agreements with Star India.
