= Thank You (2022 film) =

2022 film directed by Vikram Kumar

- Theatrical release poster
- Directed by: Vikram Kumar
- Screenplay by: Vikram Kumar
- Story by: B. V. S. Ravi
- Produced by: Dil Raju; Sirish
- Starring: Naga Chaitanya; Raashii Khanna; Malavika Nair; Avika Gor; Sai Sushanth Reddy
- Cinematography: P. C. Sreeram
- Edited by: Naveen Nooli
- Music by: Thaman S
- Production company: Sri Venkateswara Creations
- Release date: 22 July 2022
- Running time: 129 minutes
- Country: India
- Language: Telugu
- Budget: ₹40 crore
- Box office: est.₹8.95 crore

Thank You is a 2022 Indian Telugu-language romantic drama film directed by Vikram Kumar from a story written by B. V. S. Ravi. It is produced by Dil Raju and Sirish under Sri Venkateswara Creations. The film stars Naga Chaitanya, Raashii Khanna, Malavika Nair, Avika Gor and Sai Sushanth Reddy.

Thank You was released theatrically on 22 July 2022. The film opened to negative reviews from critics and bombed at the box office.

== Plot ==
In New York, Priya learns that she is pregnant, much to her distress. She talks to her family friend, Aunt Sailaja, about her relationship with her live-in boyfriend, Abhi.

In 2011, Abhi comes to New York from India through a consultancy company managed by Sailaja's husband, Rao, through which he meets Priya. He designs an app called Ydhya which can diagnose any injury or disease through artificial intelligence. However, Rao disapproves of the app and insists Abhi get a steady job first. Abhi persists and successfully pitches Ydhya to a group of investors. When Rao refuses to fund him, Priya gives Abhi $15,000 to build a start-up and hire coders. In the next decade, Ydhya grows worldwide. Abhi and Priya fall in love and eventually move in together. Over time though, Abhi's enormous success causes him to become self-centric and egotistical, which strains his relationships with everyone. Priya refuses to marry Abhi as he grows distant from her.

In the present, Sailaja encourages Priya to tell Abhi about her pregnancy and give him a chance to change. Meanwhile, Rao struggles to place 60 people that have come through his consultancy before their visas expire and his company goes into debt. Rao, as a last hope, tries to meet Abhi, but he coldly refuses to employ them in retaliation on Rao for denying him the funding for his start-up. This causes Priya to break up with Abhi, just as Rao gets a fatal cardiac arrest. Abhi then gets a call from one of his investors, who reveals that Rao convinced him to invest in Ydhya. A conflicted Abhi has a panic attack which causes his dormant conscience to manifest. Abhi's conscience tells him to re-visit his past to remember all the people that helped him succeed up to that point.

In 2003, an 18-year-old Abhi is an excellent student and promising hockey player in Narayanapuram. He wins a boat race and gets his higher studies funded by the village head, Narayana Rao. Abhi also develops feelings for Narayana Rao's daughter, Parvathi aka Paaru, who he tries to help get into culinary school. When Narayana Rao finds out about their romance, he threatens Abhi's mother to take her son and leave the village. Abhi asks Paaru to come with him, but she leaves him for good, urging Abhi to never compromise his goals.

In the present, Abhi reunites with Paaru, now married and having two daughters and running her own cooking channel. He ultimately thanks Paaru for leaving him that day, as it allowed him to go to pursue his future studies and dreams. He also helps Narayana Rao reconcile with Paaru. Abhi tries calling Priya, but she declines, planning to get an abortion against Sailaja's wishes. Abhi's conscience instructs him to meet his college rival, Sharva.

In 2006 in Visakhapatnam, Abhi and Sharva have a heated rivalry for three years, which is fueled through field hockey. However, Abhi begins to develop a sibling-like relationship with Sharva's sister, Chinnu, who tries to end their enmity. She secretly helps Abhi win a hockey game against Sharva, allowing Abhi to be selected for the Railways. An enraged Sharva lures Abhi to the hockey field after their graduation and heavily beats him up with his gang. Abhi escapes on a train, but his hand is broken, ending his hockey career.

In the present, Abhi meets Sharva at his MLA campaign. Sharva lost his leg six years prior in a car bomb planted by an opponent. He apologizes to Abhi for his actions, and they reconcile. After reuniting with Chinnu, Abhi thanks Sharva for beating him up that day because his broken hand served as the inspiration for Ydhya.

Abhi returns to New York and makes amends by employing the 60 people from Rao's consultancy at Ydhya, rehiring the employees who were part of his initial success, making the app free, and resigning as CEO. Priya learns of Abhi's deeds at Rao's funeral and finds him at the airport, now working for Rao's consultancy. Priya and Abhi reconcile, with Abhi thanking Priya for standing by him. Priya reveals she is pregnant, having decided to keep their baby.

== Cast ==
- Naga Chaitanya as Abhiram
- Raashii Khanna as Priya
- Malavika Nair as Parvati Cherukuri "Paaru"
- Avika Gor as Sravani Reddy "Chinnu"
- Anirudh Paka as Anil
- Sai Sushanth Reddy as Sharva Reddy
- Prakash Raj as Rao
- Sampath Raj as Narayana Rao
- Srinivas Avasarala as Karthik
- Easwari Rao as Sailaja
- Tulasi as Abhi's mother
- Sunil in a cameo appearance in the "Farewell Song"

== Production ==
Thank You was announced in August 2020. The film features Naga Chaitanya alongside Raashi Khanna, Avika Gor, and Malavika Nair. The film was formally launched with a pooja ceremony in October 2020. The music of the film is being composed by S. Thaman.

The principal photography was expected to begin from Dusserah (October 2020) but ultimately began on 21 December 2020.

== Music ==
Thank You

Soundtrack album by Thaman S
- Released: 24 July 2022
- Recorded: 2021–2022
- Genre: Feature film soundtrack
- Length: 19:59
- Language: Telugu
- Label: Aditya Music
- Producer: Thaman S

Thaman S chronology
Sarkaru Vaari Paata (2022)	Thank You (2022)	Godfather (2022)

Singles from Thank You
- 1. "Maaro Maaro" Released: 10 June 2022; 2. "Ento Enteynto" Released: 16 June 2022; 3. "Farewell Song" Released: 27 June 2022; 4. "Thank You Title Song" Released: 17 July 2022

The film score and soundtrack album of the film is composed by Thaman S. The music rights were acquired by Aditya Music.

No.	Title	Lyrics	Singer(s)	Length
1.	"Maaro Maaro"	Viswa, Kittu Visapragada	Deepu, Prudhvi Chandra, MaaHaa	3:37
2.	"Ento Enteynto"	Ananta Sriram	Jonita Gandhi	3:46
3.	"Farewell Song"	Chandrabose	Armaan Malik	4:12
4.	"Thank You Title Song"	Vanamali	Karthik	4:00
5.	"E Nimisham"	Ananta Sriram	Manisha Eerabathini, Sri Krishna	4:23
Total length:				19:59

== Release ==
=== Theatrical ===
Thank You was released in cinemas on 22 July 2022. Previously the film was scheduled to release on 8 July 2022 but was postponed due to a delay in post-production.

=== Home-media ===
The digital distribution rights were acquired by Amazon Prime Video and Sun NXT. It was premiered on Amazon Prime Video on 11 August 2022.

== Reception ==
Thank You received negative reviews from critics. Ram Venkat Srikar of Cinema Express rated the film 3 out of 5 stars and wrote "Thank You still has its soul intact and ensures that it puts a smile on your face". Neeshita Nyayapati of The Times of India rated the film 2.5 out of 5 stars and wrote "Thank You doesn't offer anything fresh in terms of the story or the performances". Janani K of India Today rated the film 2.5 out of 5 stars and wrote "If only director Vikram Kumar had concentrated more on the screenplay, Thank You would have made more impact". Shubham Kulkarni of Koimoi rated the film 1.5 out of 5 stars and wrote "Thank you is just another lazy film about a manchild trying to mend things without any layer or metaphor".

Arvind V of Pinkvilla rated the film 2 out of 5 stars and wrote "Writer BVS Ravi and director Vikram K Kumar should have invested in Abhiram's character more". Balakrishna Ganeshan of The News Minute rated the film 2 out of 5 stars and wrote "Thank You could have been a better film, had the writing been more strong and not so superficial. But as a visual art, the film excels". A critic for The Hans India rated the film 2 out of 5 stars and wrote "Only a few moments in the first half an hour are worth watching while the rest of the film is nothing but a thorough disappointment and difficult the sit through its entirety". Sangeetha Devi Dundoo of The Hindu wrote in her review "Thank You begins on a promising note and ends up withering away its chances of being a truly moving and poignant journey. This isn't among the memorable films in Vikram Kumar's oeuvre."
