= Srinivasa Kalyanam (2018 film) =

- Theatrical release poster
- Directed by: Satish Vegesna
- Written by: Satish Vegesna
- Produced by: Dil Raju
- Starring: Nithin; Raashii Khanna; Nandita Swetha
- Narrated by: Venkatesh
- Cinematography: Sameer Reddy
- Edited by: Madhu
- Music by: Mickey J. Meyer
- Production company: Sri Venkateswara Creations
- Release date: 9 August 2018
- Running time: 140 minutes
- Country: India
- Language: Telugu
- Budget: est. ₹25.5 crore

Srinivasa Kalyanam (transl. The wedding of Srinivasa) is a 2018 Indian Telugu-language romantic family drama produced by Dil Raju on Sri Venkateswara Creations banner and directed by Satish Vegesna. The film stars Nithin, Raashii Khanna, and Nandita Swetha, with music composed by Mickey J. Meyer. The film released on 9 August 2018. The film opened to lukewarm reviews upon release and was a commercial failure at the box office. However, the dubbed versions on YouTube however garnered immense popularity amongst viewers. Dil Raju and Nithiin worked together on this movie after 15 years.

== Plot ==
Srinivas "Vasu" is a traditional guy who believes that marriage is the greatest festival in life and not just an event, but a beautiful moment. He lives away from his family. His cousin Padmavathi "Paddu" is in love with him and decides to propose to him on the day he arrives. Vasu works as an architect in Chandigarh and meets Sridevi "Sri", who does several petty jobs for a living. They both eventually fall in love with each other. After the marriage of their friend Priya, they both realize that they are meant for each other, and Vasu proposes to Sri. Sri is a rich girl who lives a normal life as suggested by her father, R. K., to understand people before taking part in his business. R. K. believes that marriage is an event in one's life and is not worth wasting a lot of time. Vasu informs R. K. about his love and asks for his permission. Both families meet and agree on their marriage, much to Paddu's disappointment. However, R. K. asks Vasu to sign the premarital agreement before he marries Sri, which he does. He then asks R. K. to promise to be present in everything that has to be done by the bride's father. Vasu changes the views of R. K. about traditional marriages through his words and actions. On the wedding day, Sri's sister Kavya finds the agreement papers, while Paddu confesses her love to Vasu, who says that he always treated her as a friend, and even though he had not fallen for Sri, he would never accept her love. On the altar, Vasu feels it wrong to keep the secret of the agreement and apologizes to his family until Kavya arrives with the agreement. Then, R. K. speaks about how Vasu changed him and tears the papers. Sri forgives Vasu, and both happily get married. In the end credits, it is told that many people's lives changed due to their wedding, including Kavya who reconciles with her husband Siddhu, from whom she wanted to divorce.

== Cast ==
- Nithin as Indhukuri Srinivasa Raju "Vasu"
- Raashii Khanna as Rudraraju Sridevi "Sri"
- Nandita Swetha as Padmavati "Paddu", Vasu's cousin.
- Prakash Raj as Rudraraju Radha Krishna (R.K), Sri's father
- Sithara as Lakshmi, Sri's mother
- Rajendra Prasad as Indhukuri Ramaraju, Vasu's father
- Aamani as Seeta, Vasu's mother
- Siva Krishna as Vasu's Grandfather (Cameo Appearance)
- Jayasudha as Vasu's grandmother
- Naresh as Raju, padmavati's father and Vasu's paternal Uncle
- Mamilla Shailaja Priya as Sarada, Padmavati's mother and Vasu's paternal Aunt
- Raja Chembolu as Siddu, Kavya's Husband (End credits)
- Poonam Kaur as Kavya, Sri's elder sister
- Ajay as Ajay, wedding planner
- Prabhas Sreenu as Seenu
- Praveen as Praveen, Vasu's friend who doesn't believe in marriage system later marries Bujji.
- Vidyullekha Raman as Bujji, Vasu's friend later marries Praveen.
- Satyam Rajesh as Rajesh, Vasu's friend
- Hari Teja as Shanti, Rajesh's wife
- RJ Hemath as Shekhar, Vasu's friend
- Lahari Shari as Priya, Shekhar's fiancé later wife and Vasu's friend.
- Josh Ravi as Prabhu, Vasu's friend
- Mahesh Achanta as Veerababu, servant
- Gemini Kiran as Vasu's Uncle.
- Meena as Vasu's aunt
- Giri Babu as Vasu's relative
- Chandra Mohan as Vasu's relative
- Prabhu as Vasu's cousin
- Rajitha as Vasu's relative
- Annapurna as Vasu's relative
- Subhalekha Sudhakar as Minister; who attends Shekar's wedding.
- Sivannarayana Naripeddi as Rao, Shekhar's father.
- Duvvasi Mohan as Minister's PA
- Rupa Lakshmi
- Deekshitulu as Priest
- Namala Murthy
- Appaji Ambarisha Darbha as Businessman and R.K's colleague

== Release ==
The film was released on 9 August 2018. The film was dubbed and released in Hindi with the same name in 2019 and in Tamil as Kalyana Vaibhogam.

== Soundtrack ==
Srinivasa Kalyanam

Soundtrack album by Mickey J. Meyer
- Released: 22 July 2018
- Recorded: 2018
- Genre: Soundtrack
- Length: 26:11
- Label: Aditya Music
- Producer: Mickey J. Meyer

Mickey J. Meyer chronology
Mahanati (2018)	Srinivasa Kalyanam (2018)	Oh! Baby (2019)

The music is composed by Mickey J. Meyer and was released on ADITYA Music Company.

Track-List
No.	Title	Lyrics	Singer(s)	Length
1.	"Kalyanam Vaibhogam"	Sri Mani	S. P. Balasubrahmanyam	3:56
2.	"Ekkada Nuvvunte"	Sri Mani	Dhanunjay	4:13
3.	"Ithadena Ithadena"	Sri Mani	Shreya Ghoshal, Sreerama Chandra (Chorus)	2:57
4.	"Modalaudaam"	Ramajogayya Sastry	Sunitha Upadrashta, Anurag Kulkarni	4:12
5.	"Something Something"	Sri Mani	Anurag Kulkarni, Sravana Bhargavi	3:02
6.	"Vinavamma Toorupu Chukka"	Sri Mani	Sunitha Upadrashta	4:22
7.	"Kalyanam Vaibhogam (Climax Version)"	Sri Mani	S. P. Balasubrahmanyam	3:23
Total length:				26:11
