= Venky Mama =

Indian Telugu-language action comedy film

- Theatrical release poster
- Directed by: Bobby Kolli
- Screenplay by: Kona Venkat; K. Chakravarthy Reddy
- Dialogues by: Janardhana Maharshi
- Story by: Janardhana Maharshi
- Produced by: D. Suresh Babu; T. G. Vishwa Prasad
- Starring: Venkatesh; Naga Chaitanya; Raashii Khanna; Payal Rajput
- Cinematography: Prasad Murella
- Edited by: Prawin Pudi
- Music by: Thaman S
- Production companies: Suresh Productions; People Media Factory
- Release date: 13 December 2019
- Running time: 144 minutes
- Country: India
- Language: Telugu
- Budget: ₹35 crore
- Box office: est. ₹72 crore

Venky Mama (transl. Uncle Venky) is a 2019 Indian Telugu-language action comedy film directed by Bobby Kolli (credited as K. S. Bobby). It stars Venkatesh, Naga Chaitanya, Raashii Khanna, and Payal Rajput in the lead roles, while Nassar, Prakash Raj, and Rao Ramesh play supporting roles. The film was produced by D. Suresh Babu of Suresh Productions and T. G. Vishwa Prasad of People Media Factory, with music composed by Thaman.

The film was released on 13 December 2019, coinciding with Venkatesh's birthday, to mixed reviews from critics with praise for Venkatesh's performance and criticism for its script and writing but ended up as a commercial success at the box office.

== Cast ==
- Venkatesh as Venkatarathnam Naidu / Military Naidu / Venky Mama, Karthik's maternal uncle, Vennela's husband, Ramanarayana and Lakshmi's son
- Naga Chaitanya as Captain Karthik Shivaram Veeramachineni, Para SF Victory Alludu
- Raashii Khanna as Harika, Karthik's love interest later turned wife
- Payal Rajput as Vennela, Venkatarathnam's wife, Apparao's daughter, Karthik's maternal aunt
- Prakash Raj as Brigadier Vijay Prakash (Para SF)
- Nassar as Ramanarayana, Lakshmi's husband, Venkatarathnam's father, Karthik's maternal grandfather
- Geetha as Lakshmi, Ramanarayana's wife, Venkatarathnam's mother, Karthik's maternal grandmother
- Rao Ramesh as MLA Pasupathi, Harika's father
- Sivannarayana as Apparao, Vennela's father
- Mamilla Shailaja Priya as Harika's mother
- Nagineedu as Gagani, Karthik's paternal grandfather
- Indu Anand as Karthik's paternal grandmother
- Charuhasan as Astrologer Namboodri
- Raghu Babu as Advocate Happy Hanumantha Rao
- Aditya Menon as Lieutenant Colonel Ajay Ahuja
- Kishore as Major Anwar Sadat (Mahar Regiment)
- AK as Terrorist
- Parag Tyagi as Terrorist Mohammad Abu Osman
- John Kokken as Bihari Contract Killer
- Chammak Chandra as Nukaraju
- Hyper Aadi as Seetharam, Karthik's friend
- Raghu Karumanchi as Raghuramaiah
- Jeeva as Cow-broker Babji
- Vidyullekha Raman as Candy, Harika's friend
- Pooja Ramachandran as Bride
- Gundu Sudarshan as School Teacher
- C. V. L. Narasimha Rao as Master
- Narra Srinu as Subedar Rama Rao (Mahar Regiment)
- Dasari Arun Kumar as Dora Babu, Pasupathi's brother-in-law
- Master Mahesh Kuchibhotla as Vennela's naughty student
- Siddharth Gollapudi as Fighter Pilot

== Production ==
=== Development ===
D. Ramanaidu, father of Venkatesh Daggubati and grandfather of Naga Chaitanya, wanted both actors to be seen together on screen, D. Suresh Babu, elder son of Ramanaidu and producer of the film said on the occasion of his father 83rd birth anniversary. So, when Suresh Babu was in search of the story, writer Janardhana Maharshi pitched a story to him which he liked and later writer and director KS Bobby was joined to direct the film and developed of the storyline of Janardhana and he made major changes to it.

Venkatesh after multi-starrers like Seethamma Vakitlo Sirimalle Chettu with Mahesh Babu, Masala with Ram Pothineni, Gopala Gopala with Pawan Kalyan, and F2 – Fun and Frustration with Varun Tej, is doing another multi-starrer, this time with his nephew Naga Chaitanya. Before this Venkatesh did a cameo role in Chaitanya's film Premam, this is the first time they are doing a full-length role together in a film.

The film was officially launched at Ramanaidu Studios by director VV Vinayak as chief guest. It is jointly produced by People Media Factory and Suresh Productions.

=== Casting ===
Initially, it was reported that Shriya Saran and Rakul Preet Singh were cast in the lead roles. But they were subsequently replaced by Payal Rajput and Raashi Khanna, respectively.

=== Filming ===
Principal photography began on the banks of Godavari River on 24 February 2019, and completed its first schedule in Rajahmundry. In March 2019, while shooting for an action sequence Venkatesh was injured and advised to take two weeks rest.

The second schedule was started in April 2019 in Hyderabad. Filming was also done in Kashmir and Visakhapatnam, and was wrapped up in August 2019.

== Soundtrack ==
Venky Mama

Soundtrack album by Thaman S
- Released: 10 December 2019
- Recorded: 2019
- Venues: Chennai; Mumbai; Hyderabad
- Studios: V studios YRF Studios; SAL
- Genre: Feature film soundtrack
- Length: 15:34
- Label: Aditya Music
- Producer: Thaman S

Thaman S chronology
Magamuni (2019)	Venky Mama (2019)	Prati Roju Pandage (2019)
External audio
- Official Audio Jukebox on YouTube

Singles from Venky Mama
- 1. "Venky Mama" Released: 7 November 2019; 2. "Yennellako" Released: 16 November 2019; 3. "Coca Cola Pepsi" Released: 4 December 2019

Music was composed by Thaman S, and released on Aditya Music company.

The first song Venky Mama was released on 7 November 2019, Sung by Sri Krishna, Mohana Bhogaraju and lyrics penned by Ramajogayya Sastry, the song tells deep bond between uncle (Venkatesh) and his nephew (Chaitanya).

The second song Yennellako was released on 16 November 2019, on the occasion of the music director Thaman S birthday, Sung by Prudhvi Chandra, Thaman S and lyrics penned by Sri Mani.

The third song Coca Cola Pepsi mass-song was released on 4 December 2019, sung by Aditi Bhavaraju, Ramya Behara, Simha and Hanuman; its lyrics were written by Kasarla Shyam.

Track list
No.	Title	Lyrics	Singer(s)	Length
1.	"Venky Mama"	Ramajogayya Sastry	Sri Krishna, Mohana Bhogaraju	4:15
2.	"Yennellako"	Sri Mani	Prudhvi Chandra, Thaman S	3:36
3.	"Coca Cola Pepsi"	Kasarla Shyam	Simha, Ramya Behara, Aditi Bhavaraju, Hanuman	3:41
4.	"Nuvvu Nenu"	Sri Mani	Anurag Kulkarni, Nanditha	4:02
Total length:				15:34

== Release ==
Venky Mama was set to release on 4 October 2019, but the release was delayed until November. The film was released on 13 December 2019, on the occasion of Venkatesh's birthday.

=== Marketing ===
In December 2019, a pre-release event was held in Khammam, later followed by a musical night event where the soundtrack album was released. K. Raghavendra Rao attended as guest.

=== Home media ===
The film is available for streaming on Amazon Prime video since 16 January 2020. The satellite rights of the film were bagged by Gemini TV

== Reception ==
=== Box office ===
Venky Mama on opening day collected ₹16.5 crore gross worldwide. On the second day, the film collected ₹14 crore gross worldwide. On the third day, the film collected ₹14.5 crore gross worldwide and despite mixed reviews the movie's first weekend worldwide gross was ₹45 crore. In 11 days, the movie collected a total gross of ₹54.90 crore and a share of ₹31.99 crore worldwide. In 13 days, the movie collected a total gross of ₹57.80 crore worldwide. Up to the third week, the movie collected a total gross of ₹72 crore worldwide.

=== Critical reception ===
Venky Mama was a success at box office but was received mixed reviews.

The Hans India gave 3 out of 5 stars stating "Having a solid storyline became the biggest plus point for this movie. The entire movies revolve around the beautiful relationship between Naga Chaitanya and Venkatesh and the director has executed it in an engaging way". Samayam gave 3.5 out of 5 stars stating "Venky Mama will make you laugh, cry and please".

The Times of India gave 2.5 out of 5 stars stating "Mediocre writing and crass humour let down this comic caper. The only saving grace for Venky Mama is the performance of its lead actors Venkatesh and Naga Chaitanya". India Today gave 2.5 out of 5 stars stating "Director had to include everything just to play to the gallery and make it please every age group. The result is nothing but a colossal disappointment and a wasted opportunity".

The News Minute gave 2 out of 5 stars stating "Venky Mama is a crowd-pleaser. What they call a mass entertainer. Two songs. Two comedians. Two “double-meaning” scenes, one wasted brilliant actor (Prakash Raj), one adored-as-god village head and a silly looking interview panel. Not really boring". Firstpost gave 2.5 out of 5 stars stating "This isn’t a film where one can judge how well an actor has performed when the writing and treatment leaves a lot to be desired. The film rushes through some of its major set-pieces and there’s hardly a build-up to moments where you might end up crying. The film just doesn't deliver what it sets out to achieve, and we are left to be content with bits and pieces of emotional sequences between Venkatesh and Naga Chaitanya. Venky Mama could have been so much more than what it is, but it's a missed opportunity!".
