= Prati Roju Pandage =

2019 film directed by Maruthi

Prathi Roju Pandage
- Theatrical poster
- Directed by: Maruthi
- Written by: Maruthi
- Screenplay by: Maruthi
- Story by: Maruthi
- Produced by: Bunny Vasu; V. Vamsi Krishna Reddy; Pramod Uppalapati; Sreenivasa Kumar Naidu (SKN)
- Starring: Sai Dharam Tej; Raashii Khanna; Sathyaraj
- Cinematography: Jaikumar Sampath
- Edited by: Kotagiri Venkateswara Rao
- Music by: Thaman S
- Production companies: UV Creations; GA2 Pictures
- Release date: 20 December 2019
- Running time: 146 minutes
- Country: India
- Language: Telugu
- Budget: ₹25 crore
- Box office: est. ₹65 crore

Prati Roju Pandage (transl. Every Day is a Festival) is a 2019 Indian Telugu-language black comedy drama film written and directed by Maruthi. The film was produced by Bunny Vasu and Sreenivasa Kumar Naidu (SKN) under GA2 Pictures and UV Creations with Sai Tej, Raashii Khanna, Sathyaraj and Rao Ramesh in the lead roles. Jaikumar handled the cinematography, S. Thaman composed the music and Kotagiri Venkateswara Rao edited the film. The movie depicts the relationship between a grandson and his grandfather and how society treats old people.

== Plot ==
Raghu Ramayya is over 75 years old. One day, Raghu Ramayya Pasupuleti goes to a hospital and asks Dr. Bharath about his condition. Bharath tells him that he has lung cancer. Raghu Ramayya informs his eldest son Anand Rao that he has cancer. Anand Rao asks Bharath how much time his father has. Bharath replies that he has very little time to live. Even though Anand Rao was skeptical about it, he plans to come to India with his siblings. Meanwhile, Sai Tej gets to know the conditions his grandfather is suffering from and travels to India to stay with him and fulfill his wishes. While he was in India, Raghu Ramayya suggests he should marry his friend, Surya Narayan, granddaughter, Angel Aarna. But Anand Rao fixes a marriage plan with his boss' (Dhamodhar) daughter. Anand Rao gets to know that Sai Tej is in love with Angel Aarna and he also gets to know that Raghu Ramayya is behind this. After a few weeks, Raghu Ramayya's kids come to India to take care of him. Raghu Ramayya gets so happy and one day he passes out. He is immediately taken to a hospital, Anand Rao thinking that his dad is dead tells this to Dhamodhar. But after a few minutes, Bharath comes and tells the real news that Raghu Ramayya was not dead but due to much happiness(of seeing his kids) had fainted, and Anand Rao realizes he is in big trouble.

As days pass on, everyone gets frustrated because they are staying in India for too long and the workload is getting too much. To keep them here, Sai Tej creates a fake "surprise" so that they can stay here and look after their father. One fine day, the whole family does a ritual. While Nagaraju and Nagaraju's brother comes to the family to warn them they will have to take the property that Raghu Ramayya visits every day. But Sai Tej beats them up. Later that day, Dhamodhar comes to India to visit Anand Rao and console him. But he learns the truth and he scolds him. Now, Anand Rao gets angry at his father and blames him for what has happened. Everyone leaves him and back to their home except Sai Tej.

But Raghu Ramayya gets seriously ill and is admitted to the hospital. Sai Tej calls his dad and tells him that his father is dead but he says that he cannot attend the death ritual. Eventually, the other two brothers and the only sister of Anand Rao also deny it. But they suggest that Sai Tej do the rituals and they will attend it through video call. Sai Tej gets angry after hearing this and the video call shows that he was not doing the ritual for his grandfather but for his father, uncles, and aunt. Seeing this, they get frustrated and they come back to India to confront him. But Sai Tej tells them how Raghu Ramayya contributed to their children's well-being and how he wanted all of his kids, grandsons, and granddaughters to have a bright future. All of them regret treating their father so badly in his older days and realize their mistake. To everyone's surprise, Sai Tej tells them that their father is not dead and is alive. Then, Raghu Ramayya comes and all the family reconciles. Later, Sai Tej and Angel Aarna marry. And in the end credits, it is shown that when Raghu Ramayya was going to fall all his kids hold him and save him. And when he asks them for his stick, they say that there is no need for a stick as they are his support. The film ends with a moral that if the children shower the same love and affection on their parents that they gave them when they were young, then every day will be celebrated as a festival, never forget that the children will also turn into parents.

== Cast ==
- Sai Dharam Tej as Sai Tej
- Raashii Khanna as "Angel" Aarna
- Sathyaraj as Raghu Ramayya Pasupuleti
- Rao Ramesh as Anand Rao, Raghu Ramayya’s eldest son
- Vijayakumar as Surya Narayana
- Naresh as Naresh Prasad (Cameo Appearance)
- Murali Sharma as Dhamodhar
- Ajay as Nagaraju
- Satyam Rajesh as Nagaraju's brother
- Gayatri Bharghavi as Raghu Ramayya's daughter
- Hari Teja as Geetha
- Praveen as Harish
- Bharath Reddy as Dr. Bharath
- Prabha as Jaanaki "Jaanu" (Cameo Appearance)
- Suhas as Suhas, Sai's friend
- Mahesh Achanta as Mahesh, Ramayya's assistant
- Srikanth Iyyengar as Sai's uncle
- Surya Srinivas as Sai’s friend
- Rajitha
- Bhadram as Geetha's brother

== Production ==
=== Launch ===
The film launched formally in June 2019 by performing pooja and muhurat shots. Dil Raju attended the event along with the film cast and crew.

=== Filming ===
The regular filming started in early July in Hyderabad. The production moved to Rajamundry for the village sequences in September 2019. Additional scenes for the song “Oo Bava” were filmed at The Renaissance Greens, in North Brunswick, New Jersey

== Soundtrack ==
Prati Roju Pandage

Soundtrack album by S. Thaman
- Released: 2019
- Recorded: 2019
- Venues: Mumbai, Chennai
- Studios: YRF Studios, V Studios
- Genre: Feature film soundtrack
- Length: 18:27
- Label: Lahari Music
- Producer: S. Thaman

S. Thaman chronology
Venky Mama (2019)	Prati Roju Pandage (2019)	Ala Vaikunthapurramuloo (2020)

The music was composed by S. Thaman.

Track list
No.	Title	Lyrics	Singer(s)	Length
1.	"Prati Roju Pandaage"	Krishna Kanth	Sri Krishna	3:44
2.	"Oo Baava"	Krishna Kanth	Satya Yamini, Mohana Bhogaraju, Hari Teja	3:58
3.	"Thakita Thakita"	Kasarla Shyam	Rahul Sipligunj, Geetha Madhuri	3:44
4.	"Chinnataname"	Sirivennela Seetharama Sastry	Vijay Yesudas	3:43
5.	"You Are My High"	Srijo	Raashii Khanna, Deepu, Rahul Nambiar	2:58
Total length:				18:27

== Release ==
The film was released on 20 December 2019.

== Home media ==
The film was made available to stream on OTT platform Disney+ Hotstar on 3 February 2020. Star Maa acquired broadcasting rights.

== Reception ==
=== Box office ===
In two days Prati Roju Pandage collected ₹12.09 crores gross and ₹7 crores share worldwide. In four days, the movie collected ₹25 crores gross worldwide. In six days, the movie collected ₹33.80 crores gross and ₹18.43 crores share worldwide. In the full run, Prati Roju Pandage collected ₹62 crores gross and ₹34 crores share worldwide and emerged as the highest-grossing movie of both Maruthi and Sai Tej.

=== Critical reception ===
Y Sunita Chowdhary of The Hindu wrote " The film has nice visuals and the content is strong as it focuses on sensitivity towards family values, especially in the climax. Maruti deserves a pat for his simple and straight dialogues and Sai Dharam Tej does well in disciplining the elders". Firstpost gave 3.25 out of 5 stars stating "Prathi Roju Pandage into a discourse on how we engage with our parents and grandparents in their old age. It has its share of laughs and emotional moments. It manages to deliver what it sets out to achieve, even if the journey is a little shaky in a few stretches". The Times of India gave 2.5 out of 5 stars stating "Satyaraj, Rao Ramesh, Murli Sharma, Hari Teja and Raashi Khanna, even in the limited role, hit the ball out of the park. The cinematography by Jayakumar is apt and Thaman S' BGM works well for the film. Prati Roju Pandaage has ample moments that’ll make you smile and relate to the characters, if not anything else".

== See also ==
- Sathamanam Bhavati
- Ammammagarillu
