= Chauhan (Koli clan) =

Clan of the Koli caste in western India

The Chauhan Koli (also spelled as Chouhan Koli and Chohan Koli) is a clan of the Koli caste living in the Gujarat and Rajasthan states in India.
