= Snow Business (company) =

Provider of artificial snow

Snow Business International Ltd
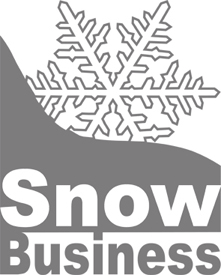
- Type: Public limited company
- Founded: 1982
- Founder: Darcey Crownshaw
- Headquarters: Stroud, Gloucestershire, England
- Number of locations: 25
- Area served: Worldwide
- Products: Artificial snow and winter effects for TV & Film, Visual Merchandising & Events
- Website: www.snowbusiness.com

Snow Business is a provider of artificial snow for various entertainment industries. The company was founded by Darcey Crownshaw in 1982. Crownshaw was working in the paper industry when a production unit filming The Last Days of Pompeii for ABC-TV placed an order with his employers for three quarters of a ton of shredded grey cellulose paper to use as artificial volcanic ash. The firm would not deliver less than 20 tons so Crownshaw fulfilled the order himself using the padding from Jiffy bags. Crownshaw later supplied the same production unit with paper snow, and spotting a gap in the market established Snow Business.

The company produces over 160 different types of artificial snow as well as frost, ice, snowballs, snowmen, icicles, igloos and icebergs. Film credits include Band of Brothers, Die Another Day, The Day After Tomorrow, the Harry Potter series, The Lion, the Witch and the Wardrobe, and The Golden Compass.

On 23 November 2006 Snow Business International set a Guinness World Record for the largest area covered with continuously falling artificial snow, covering the New Bond Street, Bond Street and Old Bond Street areas of London simultaneously. The area measured 12,462.78 m^{2} (134,148 ft^{2}).
