= Raashii Khanna =

Indian actress (born 1990)

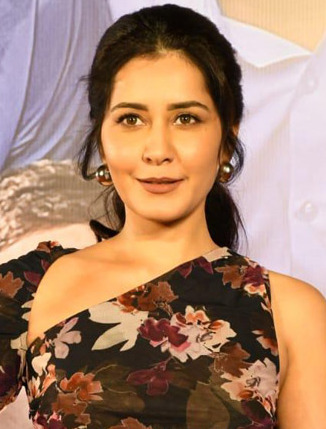
- Khanna in 2023
- Born: 30 November 1990 (age 35); Delhi, India
- Education: Lady Shri Ram College
- Occupation: Actress
- Years active: 2013–present

Raashii Khanna (born 30 November 1990) is an Indian actress who works predominantly in Telugu, Tamil and Hindi films. She made her acting debut in a supporting role with the Hindi film Madras Cafe (2013) and subsequently appeared in Telugu film Oohalu Gusagusalade (2014), which won her the SIIMA Award for Best Female Debut – Telugu.

She has appeared in many commercially successful films such as Oohalu Gusagusalade (2014), Bengal Tiger (2015), Supreme (2016), Jai Lava Kusa (2017), Tholi Prema (2018), Imaikkaa Nodigal (2018), Adanga Maru (2018), Venky Mama (2019), Prati Roju Pandage (2019), Thiruchitrambalam (2022), Sardar (2022) and Aranmanai 4 (2024), establishing herself as one of the leading actresses in Telugu and Tamil cinema. Khanna has also sung a few songs in different languages. She has since starred in the Hindi streaming series Rudra: The Edge of Darkness (2022) and Farzi (2023).

== Early life ==
Khanna was born on 30 November 1990 and hails from Delhi. She did her schooling at St. Mark's Senior Secondary Public School, Delhi and graduated with a Bachelor of Arts with honours in English at Lady Shri Ram College, Delhi.

According to Khanna, she was an academic topper who was extremely studious, geek during her schooling and college days. When Khanna was young, she wanted to become a singer but as she grew up, she was more interested into studying and aspired to become an IAS officer. Khanna claims that she neither had interest in modelling nor thought of becoming an actress and it was her destiny that made her an actress. During her college days, she tried a hand at copywriting for advertisements, before she made her venture into acting in various advertisements prior to films.

== Career ==
=== Debut and early rise in Telugu cinema (2013–2015) ===
Khanna made her on-screen debut with a supporting role in the 2013 Hindi political spy thriller film Madras Cafe directed by Shoojit Sircar, where she played the role of Ruby Singh, the wife of an Indian intelligence officer portrayed by John Abraham, who was also the producer. She had to undergo acting workshops before taking up the role. The film—particularly the story and direction—impressed most Indian critics. Reviewing the film, Saibal Chatterjee of NDTV stated that Khanna "makes an impact in a brief but significant appearance". Madras Cafe was a box-office hit grossing ₹67 crore.

Impressed with her performance in Madras Cafe, actor Srinivas Avasarala approached her for the female lead role in his directorial debut Oohalu Gusagusalade, which also featured himself and Naga Shaurya in the lead roles, which she signed in late October 2013 after considering many other south films, adding that the scope of performing made her sign the film. Khanna initially felt that it would be more of a dancing role with little scope for acting when approached for narration, but found her character practically in every scene in the film. She called her character Prabhavati as a grey, stubborn, arrogant girl but in a lovable way, which she claimed to be very different from what she was in real life except for the fact that she hails from Delhi. Khanna confirmed in early April 2014 that she appeared in a small role in the Telugu film Manam, which had its theatrical release before Oohalu Gusagusalade. (Note: Manam released on 23 May 2014, while Oohalu Gusagusalade released on 20 June 2014.) Oohalu Gusagusalade opened to positive reviews from critics and Khanna received praise for her work. Sangeetha Devi Dundoo of The Hindu called her an "actor with potential", while Hemanth Kumar of The Times of India stated that she gave a "commendable" performance which helped the movie to some extent. The film was a commercial success at the box office.

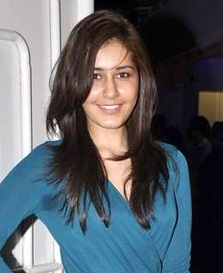
Khanna at the screening of Madras Cafe

Her next Telugu film was Joru, directed by Kumar Nagendra opposite Sundeep Kishan, which she signed after Madras Cafe and while shooting for Oohalu Gusagusalade. She played the role of Annapurna, whom Khanna described as a "modern yet traditional" girl who "is highly emotional and cries at the drop of a hat", which she called the exact opposite of the character of Prabhavati she played in her previous film. Sangeetha Devi Dundoo of The Hindu stated that she provides solace along with Kishan, Brahmanandam and Saptagiri in a film which was "let down by incoherent writing and amateurish execution". Joru was a commercial failure at the box office.

Khanna's next was Jil, directed by Radha Krishna Kumar opposite Gopichand, which she signed in early July 2014 after the makers approached her considering her performance in Oohalu Gusagusalade. The film received mixed reviews from the critics. In early May 2015, she was signed for the film Shivam alongside Ram Pothineni. The film received negative reviews from the critics and performed poorly at the box office.

=== Commercial success and debut in other languages (2015–2021) ===
Her next release was Bengal Tiger opposite Ravi Teja directed by Sampath Nandi. The film opened to mixed reviews but was commercially successful at the box office. It grossed ₹405 million (US$4.2 million) globally and became the 8th highest grossing Telugu film of 2015. In 2016, her first release was Supreme, in which she starred alongside Sai Dharam Tej, and was a commercial success, with critics praising her comic-timing in her performance as Bellam Sridevi, a cop who gets into hilarious situations. Her next release was Hyper, opposite Ram Pothineni for the second time which opened to mixed reviews and was an average grosser at the box office.

In 2017, her first release was Jai Lava Kusa, opposite N. T. Rama Rao Jr. which opened to positive reviews and became a box office hit by grossing more than ₹100 crore. Later she made her Malayalam debut with Villain, starring Mohanlal and Vishal, directed by B. Unnikrishnan where she essayed a cop in the movie. The movie opened to positive reviews with critics praising her performance as a tough, investigating cop and the movie had a good run at box-office. Her last release of 2017 was Oxygen, marking her second collaboration with Gopichand, opening to mixed reviews and the movie went on to be an average grosser at the box office.

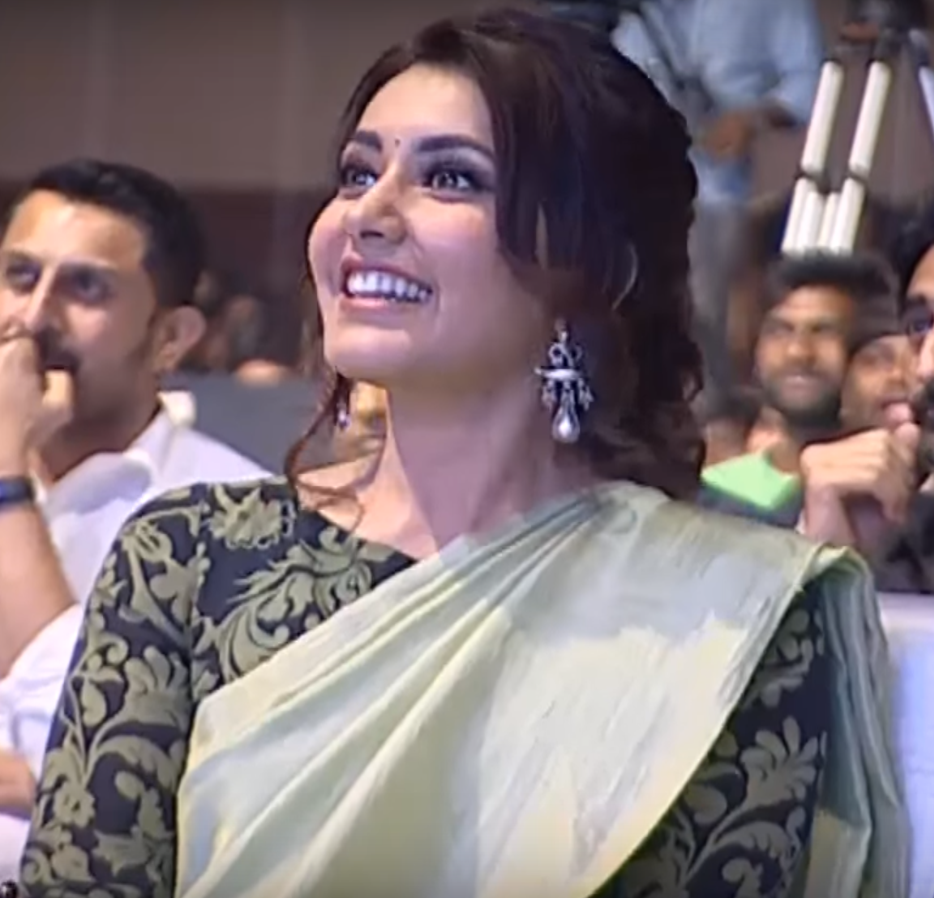
Khanna in 2018

In 2018, her first release was Touch Chesi Chudu, marking her second collaboration with Ravi Teja. Though the movie went on a huge hype pre-release, it later opened from mixed to negative reviews and was unsuccessful at the box office. Within a span of a week, her next release was Tholi Prema opposite Varun Tej, which opened to widespread acclaim from critics and audience alike, with critics praising her performance as Varsha as her best ever performance, and also applauded the chemistry between the lead pair. Her next release was Srinivasa Kalyanam, opposite Nithiin, directed by National Award winner Satish Vegesna which opened to mixed reviews but the chemistry between the lead pair was appreciated. Her next release was a multi-starrer Imaikkaa Nodigal, marking her debut in Tamil cinema opening to highly positive reviews with critics praising her performance as a girl-next-door character and was commercially successful at box office. Her next release in Tamil was Adanga Maru, opposite Jayam Ravi which received positive reviews from the critics and became a commercial success at the box office.

In 2019, Her first release was Ayogya opposite Vishal, which was an official remake of the 2015 Telugu hit, Temper which received generally positive reviews from audience and critics. The film did considerably well at the box-office. Her next release was Sangathamizhan opposite Vijay Sethupathi which opened to mixed reviews, but Khanna received praise for her performance. In December 2019, She had two releases, Venky Mama opposite Naga Chaitanya and Venkatesh which received mixed reviews and Prati Roju Pandage marking her second collaboration with Sai Dharam Tej, which received generally positive reviews with critics praising her comic-timing in her performance as "Angel" Aarna, a highly self-obsessed girl from the village town, Rajahmundry. Both the films were commercially successful at the box office. Her only release in 2020 was World Famous Lover opposite Vijay Deverakonda which opened to negative reviews and did not perform well at the box office.

In 2021, Her first release was Tughlaq Durbar marking her second collaboration with Vijay Sethupathi. The film did not opt for a theatrical release and had its direct television premiere prior to an OTT release. The film received mixed reviews from the critics. In October 2021, Khanna had two of her movies released. The first release was Bhramam opposite Prithviraj Sukumaran which had a direct OTT release only in India and an overseas theatrical release. The film was a Malayalam remake of the 2018 Hindi film Andhadhun. The film received generally positive reviews from the critics. Her next release in the same month was Aranmanai 3 opposite Arya. Despite receiving mixed to negative reviews from critics, The film was a commercial success at the box office.

=== Career expansion (2022–present) ===
In 2022, Khanna's first release was Rudra: The Edge of Darkness alongside Ajay Devgn, which also marks her digital streaming debut. It is an adaptation of the British TV show Luther. The web series opened to highly positive reviews from the critics. In July 2022, Khanna had two releases. The first release was Pakka Commercial, marking her third collaboration with Gopichand. The film received mixed reviews from the critics upon its release. The next release in the same month was Thank You, marking her second collaboration with Naga Chaitanya. The movie received mixed to negative reviews upon release, but Khanna's performance as a "mature and stifled woman" was appreciated. Both the films had poor runs at the box-office. Her next release in August 2022 was Thiruchitrambalam starring Dhanush. The film received rave reviews upon its release, with critics appreciating the performances of the cast of the film. Thiruchitrambalam became a box-office hit by grossing more than ₹100 crore worldwide. Her next release in October was Sardar opposite Karthi. The film opened to rave reviews from the audience and critics alike upon its release. Sardar went on to become the second ₹100 crore worldwide grosser for Khanna within the same calendar year.

In 2023, Khanna's only release was Farzi, created by Raj Nidimoru and Krishna D.K., co-starring Shahid Kapoor and Vijay Sethupathi. The series received mostly positive reviews from critics, with Khanna received worldwide praises for her performance as Megha Vyas, an RBI officer.Farzi becomes one of the most watched Indian OTT series of all time.

In 2024, her first release was Yodha opposite Sidharth Malhotra. The film marks Khanna's return to Hindi cinema after a decade, following her debut in the film industry with Madras cafe (2013). Yodha opened to mixed reviews from the critics, and ended up as a commercial failure at the box-office. Her next release was Aranmanai 4 alongside Sundar C and Tamannaah. It was her second collaboration with Tamannaah after Bengal Tiger (2015), and also second collaboration with Sundar C after Aranmanai 3 (2021). The film received mixed reviews from both critics and audiences. Janani K. from India Today found her performance to be "adequate". Aranmanai 4 was a commercial success at the box-office, collecting over ₹100 crores worldwide, thus making it as third consecutive 100 crore grosser movie for Khanna in Tamil cinema. Her next release in November was The Sabarmati Report opposite Vikrant Massey which opened up from mixed to negative reviews from the critics. Khanna also reprised her role from the film in soap operas Kumkum Bhagya and Kundali Bhagya as a cameo appearance.

In 2025, her first release was Aghathiyaa co-starring Jiiva and Arjun Sarja which received mixed reviews from both critics and audiences, and underperformed at the box-office.

She starred in the Hindi films 120 Bahadur, opposite Farhan Akhtar, released theatrically in November 2025.

In May 2026, she starred in the web-series Lukkhe.

==== Upcoming projects ====
As of September 2026, Khanna has completed shooting for a Hindi film titled Talaakhon Mein Ek opposite Vikrant Massey. She is currently shooting for Telugu films, Telusu Kada alongside Siddhu Jonnalagadda and Srinidhi Shetty, and Ustaad Bhagat Singh starring Pawan Kalyan and Sreeleela. Khanna is also filming for the second season of Farzi (2023). She is also filming for a Tamil film Rowdy and Co, opposite Siddharth.

== In the media ==
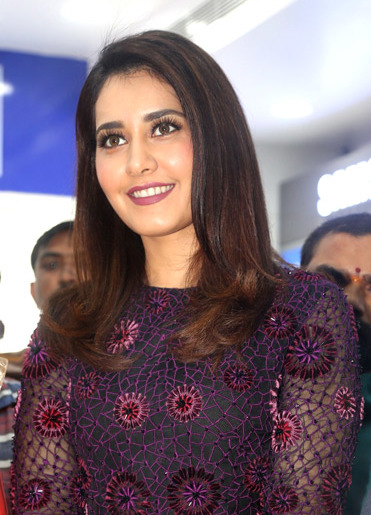
Khanna in 2018

Khanna is considered as one of the most popular actors in Telugu cinema. She stood at the 16th place on Forbes India's most influential stars on Instagram in South cinema for the year 2021. In February 2023, she topped IMDb's popular Indian celebrities weekly list. Khanna has frequently featured in Hyderabad Times' 30 Most Desirable Woman list. She was placed 28th in 2018, 15th in 2019 and 10th in 2020. She ranked 22nd in 2018 and 23rd in 2019 in Chennai Times' 30 Most Desirable Woman list. Khanna has started an initiative called #BeTheMiracle to distribute free meals to the needy in Hyderabad. She also launched an NGO called "Roti Bank" foundation, where she tied up with several NGOs that cater to the different needs and issues facing people during the COVID-19 pandemic in India.In 2026 she is brand ambassador of Challani Jewellery

== Filmography ==
Key
†	Denotes films that have not yet been released

=== Films ===
Year	Title	Role(s)	Launguage(s)	Notes	Ref.
2013	Madras Cafe	Ruby Singh	Hindi	Debut film	
2014	Manam	Prema	Telugu	Cameo appearance	
2014	Oohalu Gusagusalade	Sri Sai Sirisha Prabhavati	Telugu	Telugu debut (First lead role)	
2014	Joru	Annapoorna	Telugu		
2015	Jil	Savithri	Telugu		
2015	Shivam	Tanu	Telugu		
2015	Bengal Tiger	Shraddha	Telugu		
2016	Supreme	Bellam Sridevi	Telugu		
2016	Hyper	Bhanumathi	Telugu		
2017	Jai Lava Kusa	Priya	Telugu		
2017	Raja the Great	Herself	Telugu	Special appearance in the song "Tummeda"	
2017	Villain	Harshitha Chopra	Malayalam	Malayalam debut	
2017	Oxygen	Shruti	Telugu		
2018	Touch Chesi Chudu	Pushpa	Telugu		
2018	Tholi Prema	Varsha	Telugu		
2018	Srinivasa Kalyanam	Rudraraju Sridevi a.k.a. Sri	Telugu		
2018	Imaikkaa Nodigal	Krithika "Krithi" Rao	Tamil	Tamil debut	
2018	Adanga Maru	Anitha	Tamil		
2019	Ayogya	Sindhu	Tamil		
2019	Sangathamizhan	Kamalini Sanjay	Tamil		
2019	Venky Mama	Harika	Telugu		
2019	Prati Roju Pandage	"Angel" Aarna	Telugu		
2020	World Famous Lover	Yamini	Telugu		
2021	Tughlaq Durbar	Kamakshika	Tamil		
2021	Bhramam	Anna Simon	Malayalam		
2021	Aranmanai 3	Jyothi	Tamil		
2022	Pakka Commercial	Lawyer Sirisha (Jhansi)	Telugu		
2022	Thank You	Priya	Telugu		
2022	Thiruchitrambalam	Anusha	Tamil		
2022	Sardar	Shalini	Tamil		
2024	Yodha	Priyamvada Katyal	Hindi		
2024	Aranmanai 4	Dr. Maaya	Tamil		
2024	The Sabarmati Report	Amrita Gill	Hindi		
2025	Aghathiyaa	Veena	Tamil		
2025	Telusu Kada	Anjali	Telugu		
2025	120 Bahadur	Shugan Shaitan Singh Bhati	Hindi	Special appearance	
2026	Ustaad Bhagat Singh	Shloka	Telugu		
2027	Dharman †	TBA	Tamil	Filming	
2027	Mauja Hi Mauja †	TBA	Hindi	Post-production	
TBA	Rowdy and Co †	TBA	Tamil	Delayed	
TBA	Bridge †	TBA	Hindi	Delayed	
TBA	Talaakhon Mein Ek †	TBA	Hindi	Delayed	

=== Television ===
Raashii Khanna television credits
Year	Title	Role(s)	Language	Notes	Ref.
2022	Rudra: The Edge of Darkness	Dr. Aliyah Choksi	Hindi		
2023	Farzi	Megha Vyas	Hindi		
2024	Kumkum Bhagya	Amrita Gill	Hindi	Cameo appearance	
2024	Kundali Bhagya	Amrita Gill	Hindi	Cameo appearance	
2026	Lukkhe	Gurbani Kaur	Hindi		
2026	Farzi 2 †	Megha Vyas	Hindi	Filming	

== Discography ==
List of films and songs
Year	Film	Song	Music director	Language	Notes	Ref.
2014	Joru	"Joru"	Bheems Ceciroleo	Telugu	Theme song	
2017	Villain	"Villain Theme"	4 Musics	Malayalam	Theme song	
2017	Balakrishnudu	"Raashi Thariraa"	Mani Sharma	Telugu		
2017	Jawaan	"Bangaru"	S. Thaman	Telugu		
2019	Oorantha Anukuntunnaru	"Kanna"	K. M. Radha Krishnan	Telugu	Reprise version	
2019	Prati Roju Pandage	"You Are My High"	S. Thaman	Telugu		
2023	Satya – A Musical short feature	"The Soul of Satya"	Shruthi Ranjani	Hindi	Voiceover only	
2023	Satya – A Musical short feature	"The Soul of Satya – Rendition"	Shruthi Ranjani	Hindi; Tamil; Telugu		

== Accolades ==
Awards and nominations received by Raashii Khanna
Year	Award	Category	Work	Result	Ref.
2014	Producers Guild Film Awards	Best Debut Actress	Madras Cafe	Nominated	
2014	Producers Guild Film Awards	Best Actress in Supporting Role	Madras Cafe	Nominated	
2015	South Indian International Movie Awards	Best Female Debut – Telugu	Oohalu Gusagusalade	Won	
2015	CineMAA Awards	Best Female Debut	Oohalu Gusagusalade	Won	
2016	Zee Telugu Apsara Awards	Most Glamorous Diva of the Year	—N/a	Won	
2017	TSR TV9 National Film Awards	Best Actress	Jai Lava Kusa	Won	
2019	Zee Cine Awards Telugu	Entertainer of the Year	Tholi Prema	Won	
2019	Techofes Awards	Best Debut Actress –Tamil	Imaikkaa Nodigal	Won	
2021	South Indian International Movie Awards	Best Actress – Telugu	Prati Roju Pandage	Nominated	
2021	Sakshi Excellence Awards	Most Popular Actress of the Year	Prati Roju Pandage & Venky Mama	Won	
2023	ELLE List Awards	Rising Star of the Year	Rudra: The Edge of Darkness	Won	
2023	IWM Digital Awards	Most Popular Actress (Drama)	Farzi	Won	
2024	IWM Digital Awards	Mould Breaker Star	—N/a	Won	
2024	ELLE Beauty Awards	Fashion Luminary of the Year	—N/a	Won	
2024	Bollywood Hungama Style Icons	Most Stylish Solid Performance of the Year	—N/a	Nominated	
2025	Bollywood Hungama Style Icons	Most Stylish Splendid Performer of the Year – Female	—N/a	Won	
2025	Edison Awards South	Favourite Actress – Tamil	Aranmanai 4	Nominated	
2025	Filmfare Glamour And Style Awards South	Most Glamorous Youth Icon – Female	—N/a	Won	
2025	Filmfare Glamour And Style Awards South	Style Icon – Female	—N/a	Won	
2025	ELLE Beauty Awards	Beauty with Impact	—N/a	Won	
2026	Zee Telugu Apsara Awards	Diva of The Silver Screen	—N/a	Won	
2026	South Indian International Movie Awards	Best Actress – Telugu	Telusu Kada	Nominated	
