= Manam (film) =

2014 film written and directed by Vikram Kumar

- Theatrical release poster
- Directed by: Vikram Kumar
- Written by: Vikram Kumar; Harsha Vardhan (dialogues)
- Produced by: Akkineni Family
- Starring: Akkineni Nageswara Rao; Nagarjuna; Naga Chaitanya; Samantha Ruth Prabhu; Shriya Saran
- Cinematography: P. S. Vinod
- Edited by: Prawin Pudi
- Music by: Anup Rubens
- Production company: Annapurna Studios
- Distributed by: Reliance Entertainment
- Release date: 23 May 2014
- Running time: 163 minutes
- Country: India
- Language: Telugu
- Budget: ₹28 crore ($4.6 million)
- Box office: est. ₹124 crore ($20.4 million)

Manam (transl. Us) is a 2014 Indian Telugu-language fantasy comedy drama film written and directed by Vikram Kumar, and produced by the Akkineni Family under the Annapurna Studios banner. The film stars Akkineni Nageswara Rao, Nagarjuna, Naga Chaitanya, Samantha Ruth Prabhu and Shriya Saran. The film is set in various time periods, over the course of a hundred years up until 2013, and deals with the concepts of rebirth and eternal love. The plot features a wealthy businessman, Nageswara Rao (Nagarjuna), attempting to bring a young couple who resembles his deceased parents together and the elderly Chaitanya's (Nageswara Rao) attempts to bring the businessman and a doctor together. They resemble Chaitanya's deceased parents, who died because of a mistake committed by him in his childhood.

The film was made with a budget of ₹28 crore ($4.6 million). (Note: The average exchange rate in 2014 was 100.03 Indian rupees (₹) per 1 US dollar (US$).) Harsha Vardhan wrote the film's dialogues, while Anup Rubens composed the film's music. P. S. Vinod handled the film's cinematography and Prawin Pudi edited the film. Production began on 3 June 2013. Principal photography began on 7 June 2013 and was shot in and around Hyderabad, Coorg and Mysore till mid April 2014.

Manam was the last film of Nageswara Rao, who died on 22 January 2014 during the film's production phase and was promoted as a "befitting send off" and a tribute from his son, Nagarjuna. The film released worldwide on 23 May 2014 to positive reviews from critics and was commercially successful, collecting ₹62 crore ($10.2 million) in its lifetime. Over the years, the film has garnered a cult following and is considered by many to be one of the greatest films ever made in Telugu cinema.

It was featured at the 45th IFFI in the Homage to ANR section on 29 November 2014. The film garnered several accolades. It won five Filmfare Awards South including the Best Film and Best Director in Telugu films category.

== Plot ==
Radha Mohan and Krishna Veni are a married couple. One night their romance leads to sex. Unfortunely soon they start facing problems. Against the wishes of their six-year-old son, Nageswara Rao aka Bittu, they decide to file for divorce. On February 14, 1983, at 10:20 AM, while en route to their lawyer's office, they die in a car accident near a clock tower.

Thirty years later, Nageswara Rao has grown into a wealthy and influential businessman. By chance, he encounters two adults Nagarjuna and Priya, who are the exact lookalikes of his deceased parents. Desperate to give them a happy ending his parents never had, he secretly befriends the two and plots to unite them as a couple. However, Nageswara Rao grows disappointed after Nagarjuna introduces his girlfriend, Prema. With the help of his assistant, Girish Karnad, Nageswara Rao successfully orchestrates the breakup of Nagarjuna and Prema. Devastated and unaware of Nageswara Rao's interference, Nagarjuna vows never to fall in love again.

Meanwhile, near the same clock tower, Nageswara Rao meets Dr. Anjali and falls in love with her at first sight. They transport an injured elderly man named Chaitanya to a hospital, and Nageswara Rao donates his blood for the treatment. Upon waking, Chaitanya is astonished to see Nageswara Rao and Anjali together, recognizing them as the exact lookalikes of his own deceased parents, Seetharamudu and Ramalakshmi.

In a flashback, Seetharamudu is an affluent, car enthusiast barrister who returns from London to manage his family's Zamindari estate after his father's demise. He chooses to marry Ramalakshmi, a poor farmer, who requests a six-month delay to earn enough money to buy traditional clothes for the groom. Intrigued, he visits her village disguised as a reformed thief and helps her cultivate her fields, allowing her to raise the funds in just three months. Ramalakshmi discovers the truth about his identity on their wedding day and they enjoy a blissful married life. A few years later, an eight-year-old Chaitanya fakes a stomach ache to cut his parents' trip short. Rushing home to their son, the couple dies in a high-speed car crash on February 14, 1924 at 10:20 AM near the same clock tower.

In the present, the elderly Chaitanya resolves to unite Nageswara Rao and Anjali without triggering their past-life memories. To facilitate his plan, Chaitanya moves in with Nageswara Rao under the guise of medical care, necessitating Anjali's frequent visits. Soon after, Nagarjuna also moves in, having been expelled from his college hostel after a drunken stupor and embarrassing incident involving his college principal. One night, Priya remembers her past life as Krishna after she narrowly escapes an accident at the clock tower. She rushes to Nageswara Rao's house, only to see Nagarjuna sleeping beside him, and leaves in tears. Unaware of her awakening, Nagarjuna and Priya enroll in Salsa dancing classes together, where Priya constantly takes her frustration out on him.

On Nageswara Rao's birthday, 13th February, 2014, Anjali proposes to Nageswara Rao, delighting Chaitanya. That evening, Priya confronts Nagarjuna, who surprises her by dressing like Radha. He reveals that he, too, regained his past-life memories on the night she visited Nageswara Rao. He apologizes for their past fallout, and proposes to her, leading to a reconciliation.

The following morning, on February 14, Nagarjuna and Priya drive to a temple, unaware that their car's brakes have failed. Realizing the danger, Nageswara Rao and Anjali follow the couple, while a frantic Chaitanya hitches a ride on the back of a motorcycle driven by a young man named Akhil. At the clock tower, as 10:20 AM approaches, Rao and Anjali manage to safely intercept and stop Nagarjuna and Priya's runaway car. Suddenly, a heavy lorry driven by a drunk driver deviates towards the four of them. Before they could be hit, Chaitanya and Akhil leap off the motorcycle, sending it crashing into the lorry's front tire and deflecting the vehicle away from the group.

Having cheated the 10:20 AM curse at the clock tower, Nageswara Rao and Nagarjuna express their gratitude to Akhil and Chaitanya.

== Cast ==
- Akkineni Nageswara Rao as Chaitanya
  - Pawan Bolisetty as Young Chaitanya
- Nagarjuna in a dual role as
  - Sitaramudu, Chaitanya's father
  - Nageswara "Bittu" Rao, Radha and Krishna's son
    - Yashvardhan Singh as Young Bittu
- Naga Chaitanya in a dual role as
  - Radha Mohan, Nageswara "Bittu" Rao's father
  - Nagarjuna
- Samantha Ruth Prabhu in a dual role as
  - Krishnaveni, Nageswara "Bittu" Rao's mother
  - Priya
- Shriya Saran in a dual role as
  - Ramalaxmi, Chaitanya's mother
  - Dr. Anjali
- Brahmanandam as Girish Karnad
- Ali as Leonardo DiCaprio
- M. S. Narayana as Father Francis
- Jaya Prakash Reddy as Home Minister J.P.
- Chalapathi Rao as merchant
- Posani Krishna Murali as Inspector Dharma
- Shankar Melkote as Yashwanth Rayudu, Prema's father
- Srinivasa Reddy as car broker
- Krishnudu as Doctor
- Ramchandra as Dr. Babu Rao
- Chitram Srinu as Constable Sreenu
- Saptagiri as Nagarjuna's friend
- Gundu Sudharshan as marriage broker
- Ambati Srininivas as Home Minister's assistant
- Duvvasi Mohan as Home Minister's assistant
- Saranya as Sitaramudu's mother
- Tejaswi Madivada as Divya
- Satya Krishnan as lecturer
- Kaushal Sharma
- Swetha Varma as Announcer

Special appearances:

- Amitabh Bachchan as Pratapji
- Amala Akkineni as a Dance teacher
- Akhil Akkineni as Akhil (Himself)
- Lavanya Tripathi as Radha Mohan's friend
- Raashii Khanna as Prema
- Nitu Chandra as Airhostess

== Production ==
=== Development ===
After the release of 100% Love (2011), Nagarjuna decided to act and produce in an all-star film along with his father, actor Akkineni Nageswara Rao and elder son Naga Chaitanya. Nageswara Rao suggested Nagarjuna to begin the film as early as possible, because of his age. After examining and rejecting many scripts due to a perceived lack of novelty, Nagarjuna was advised by actor Nithin's father and distributor Sudhakar Reddy to listen to a script by Vikram Kumar, who was directing Nithin and Nithya Menen in Ishq (2012). Although he liked the script after the first narration, he agreed to act in the film only after watching Ishq before its theatrical release.

Kumar requested Nagarjuna a year's time to complete and provide the finishing touches to the script. The latter read the script to director K. Raghavendra Rao, who suggested Kumar develop a simpler version, as the original was too complicated. The rewritten version was read to Nagarjuna in two and a half hours and to Nageswara Rao over six hours, as the latter wanted every detail to be clear. Due to the complex nature of the second half, the latter suggested Kumar to add a comedy plotline between grandfather and grandson. After its incorporation into the script, and after considering the titles Hum and Trayam, Manam was chosen as the film's title on Nageswara Rao's suggestion.

The film was officially launched on 3 June 2013 at Annapurna Studios office by conducting a small pooja ceremony. Nageswara Rao died in late January 2014, making this film his last project as an actor. The promotion material featured the "Akkineni Family" as the film's producer. Nagarjuna revealed in an interview that he did so because Nageswara Rao taught his family the importance of it in his last days. Reliance Entertainment co-produced and distributed the film.

=== Casting ===
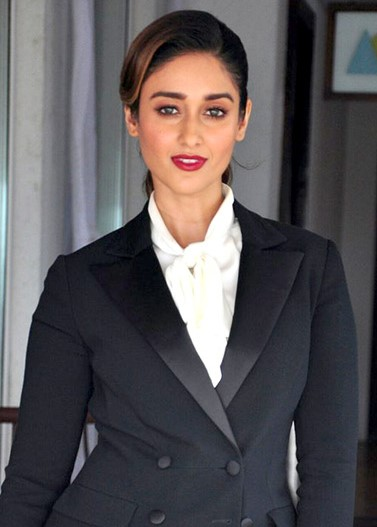
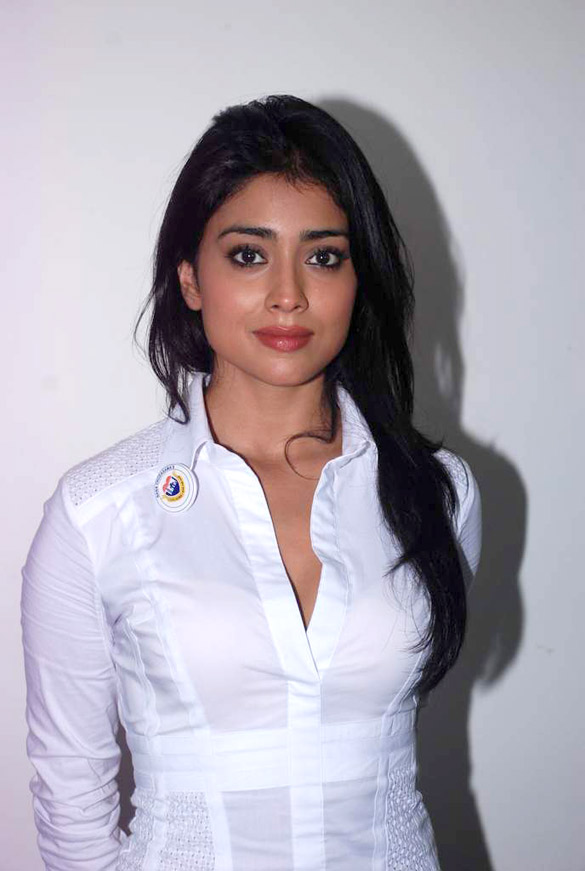
Ileana D'Cruz (left) was considered for the female lead to be paired with Nagarjuna in the film but Shriya Saran (right) was finalised due to remuneration issues with the former.

Nagarjuna engaged Samantha Ruth Prabhu as the second female lead, to be paired with Chaitanya in the film. This was her third collaboration with Chaitanya after Ye Maaya Chesave (2010) and Autonagar Surya (2014). (Note: Manam had its theatrical release before Autonagar Surya because of the latter's financial problems.) Her inclusion was confirmed in mid-October 2012 by Nagarjuna in an interview with The Times of India.

Ileana D'Cruz was approached for the main female lead role to be paired with Nagarjuna in early February 2013. She was impressed with her role and the film's script and quoted a fee of ₹20 million, which was denied by sources close to her. However, Shriya Saran was signed as the main female lead as her fourth collaboration with Nagarjuna. (Note: Shriya Saran collaborated with Nagarjuna for three films in the past : Santosham (2002), Nenunnanu (2004) and Boss – I Love You (2006).) Nagarjuna announced in mid September 2013 that Kaushal Sharma, Srikar Chittarbu and Krishna Yadav, who graduated from the Annapurna International School of Film and Media, would make their debut with this film.

Nagarjuna's younger son Akhil Akkineni was rumoured to be making a cameo appearance following Nageswara Rao's request. Sources close to the film's unit initially denied those reports. Samantha later tweeted that Akhil appeared for shooting his portions in the film. When his health conditions worsened, Nageswara Rao asked Nagarjuna to bring the dubbing equipment to dub for his role fifteen days before his surgery as he did not want any other artist to do it if his voice worsened. He completed those activities just before he died on 22 January 2014. Only an appearance in a song remained incomplete.

"My father [Nageswara Rao] always thought of Bachchan saab as one of the finest actors we have. I thought just having him in my film would be an honour to my father's memory. When I asked him, he immediately agreed. We didn't want Bachchan saab's appearance to be made public. We wanted it to be a surprise. But nothing he does can remain undisclosed."

— Nagarjuna in an interview with IANS.

Neetu Chandra, who worked with Kumar on Yavarum Nalam (2009), made a cameo appearance in the film. Nagarjuna's sister Supriya told the media that a few other actors also made cameo appearances in the film. Raashii Khanna confirmed in early April 2014 that she too would make such an appearance. Kumar convinced Nagarjuna to let Akhil make a cameo appearance towards the end of the film or in a special song. However an official confirmation was originally unavailable. Amitabh Bachchan posted in his official blogging site on 27 April 2014 that he would make a quick cameo appearance in the film which would be his debut in Telugu cinema. Lavanya Tripathi also made a cameo appearance on Kumar's request. Akhil made a cameo towards the film's end, as he did not want to miss a chance of sharing the screen with his grandfather.

=== Crew ===
Anup Rubens was selected to compose the film's music and background score in mid March 2013 marking his second collaboration with both Kumar and Chaitanya after Ishq (2012) and Autonagar Surya (2014) respectively. Kumar read the script to Rubens without revealing the film's cast. After Rubens accepted a role in the film, both met Nagarjuna. Rubens said in an interview that he worked for fewer days when compared to his previous works and added that Kumar had a small story to tell within every song in the film. Due to Nageswara Rao's death, a song's tune was replaced with another tune and a few lines of the song Nenu Puttanu from the film Prem Nagar (1971).

Harsha Vardhan was selected in late April 2013 to write the film's dialogues, in consideration of his work in Gunde Jaari Gallanthayyinde (2013). Since the film was a period drama, Nagarjuna wanted an experienced veteran cinematographer, and approached P. C. Sreeram. As Sreeram was busy with I (2015), P. S. Vinod was finalised as the cinematographer, marking his return to Telugu cinema after Panjaa (2011). Chennai-based costume designer Nalini Sriram, who worked for Ye Maaya Chesave, was selected as the film's costume designer. While all the artists had to give their inputs for the costumes, Nageswara Rao gave her full freedom to design the film's costumes.

Rajeevan, also a part of the technical team of Ye Maaya Chesave, was chosen as the film's art director. In a press interview during the first look launch, executive producer Supriya announced the remaining key technicians. Prawin Pudi was confirmed as the film's editor. Brinda was signed in on to choreograph the song sequences. FEFSI Vijayan was chosen as the stunt choreographer. Vanamali and Chandrabose were chosen to write the lyrics for the songs.

=== Characterisations ===
Nageswara Rao played the role of a 90-year-old man. His character enters the film just before the interval and remains until the very end of the film. All the members of the principal cast except Nageswara Rao played dual roles in the film. Nagarjuna said in an interview that he would be seen in the 1920s, 1980s and 2013 and would play a zamindar in 1920. Saran revealed that every character in the film would have a specific aspect; Nagarjuna's character loves cars. Regarding her role, Saran said that she would be seen as a poor but content farmer in the flashback sequences and a doctor in the present day. She added "My character goes back to 1930s and comes back in the present era. I can't tell how it happens though. It's a fun character and you will find me stammering a lot. Suddenly, I'm talking normally and suddenly I start stammering, that's how you understand my character." She added that apart from Nagarjuna, she has more scenes with Nageswara Rao and only a couple of scenes with Chaitanya in the film.

Chaitanya is seen as the father of a six-year-old in the 1980s and a happy-go-lucky college student in 2013. He described the former role as a challenging one. He also said that both the roles would have multiple layers and added, "The film as you all would know by now, is spread across three generations, and all the characters go back and forth in time. I play a happy-go-lucky college guy in the present era. It's a typically fun character and has nothing in common with my character from the flashback. So acting wise, it was a big challenge". He described the drunk scenes shared with Nagarjuna, Nageswara Rao and his confrontation scene with Samantha towards the end of the film as the toughest scenes to act.

Samantha revealed that she too would be seen in a dual role – a mature mother named Krishna Veni in the past and a bubbly girl named Priya in the present. She added that she would not be overshadowed in the film despite the presence of three male leads. Similar to Ye Maaya Chesave, Chaitanya and Samantha had a kissing scene in this film as a part of the script. A clip of one of Samantha's looks in the film was leaked in late July 2013. She was seen sporting an urban look and opted for a complete makeover. Nagarjuna's look in the film was leaked in mid August 2013 and he was seen sporting corrective eyeglasses and a conventional clean shave and moustache for which he removed the goatee he grew for his previous works Greeku Veerudu (2013) and Bhai (2013). Saran's look in the film's flashback sequences was leaked in late February 2014.

The film had two particular wedding scenes, one filmed on Chaitanya and Samantha and the other on Nagarjuna and Saran. The first pair greet each other with "Hi" during the wedding. When Kumar wrote those scenes, they were surprised and felt that such scenes were unrealistic. But it was retained as Nageswara Rao liked it. For the other wedding scene, Kumar wanted to heighten the emotions between the two characters in that scene and it was Nagarjuna who came up with the idea of not revealing his identity to the bride till the last moment.

=== Filming ===
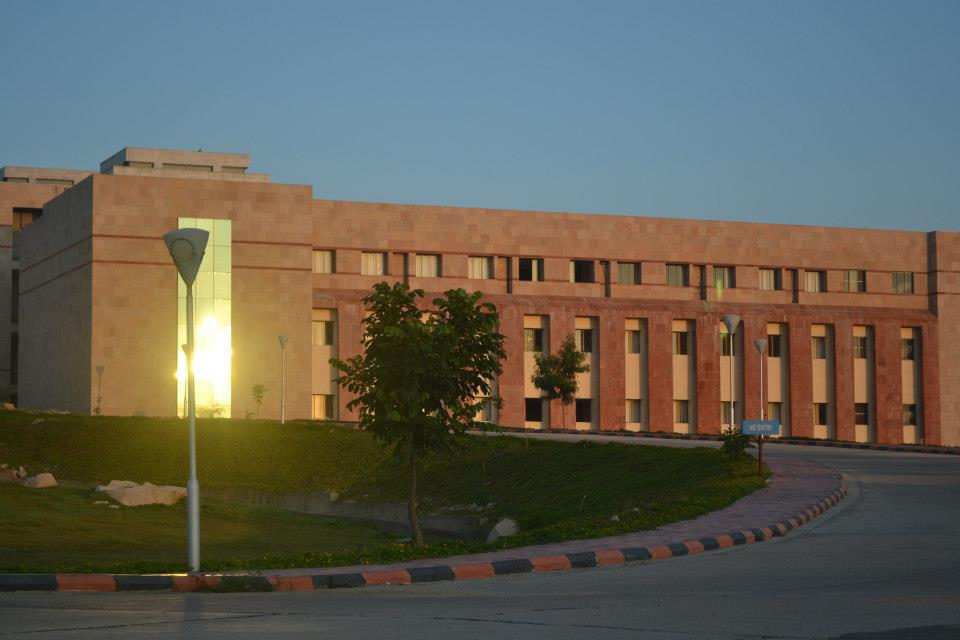
Hyderabad campus of BITS Pilani, where the film was partly shot.

Principal photography began on 7 June 2013. Scenes focusing on Chaitanya and Samantha were shot at Narayanguda in mid June 2013. The latter completed her part in the schedule and left for Switzerland on 18 June 2013 to work on Attarintiki Daredi (2013). The first schedule was wrapped up by late June 2013 and the second schedule was scheduled to begin in mid-July 2013. Some important scenes were planned to be shot in that schedule. Shriya Saran joined the film's sets in late July 2013. Samantha tweeted on 31 July 2013 that the film's second schedule had been wrapped up. The film was shot in Hyderabad Campus of Birla Institute of Technology and Science, Pilani in late August 2013 and Samantha rejoined the film's sets on 1 September 2013 after completing Ramayya Vasthavayya (2013).

Scenes featuring Nageswara Rao, Nagarjuna and Chaitanya were shot from 9 September 2013 in Hyderabad. Executive producer Supriya announced in mid September 2013 that the filming would be completed by November 2013. Nageswara Rao had chronic stomach ache, and doctors found out on 8 October 2013 that he is suffering from cancer. He announced this to the press on 19 October 2013 while on set. Recovering from surgery, Nageswara Rao rejoined the film's sets in mid November 2013. A 15-day schedule in Coorg starting from 1 December 2013 was announced in late November 2013 and key scenes on all the members of the principal cast except Nageswara Rao were planned to be shot. The next schedule began in mid December 2013 at Mysore.

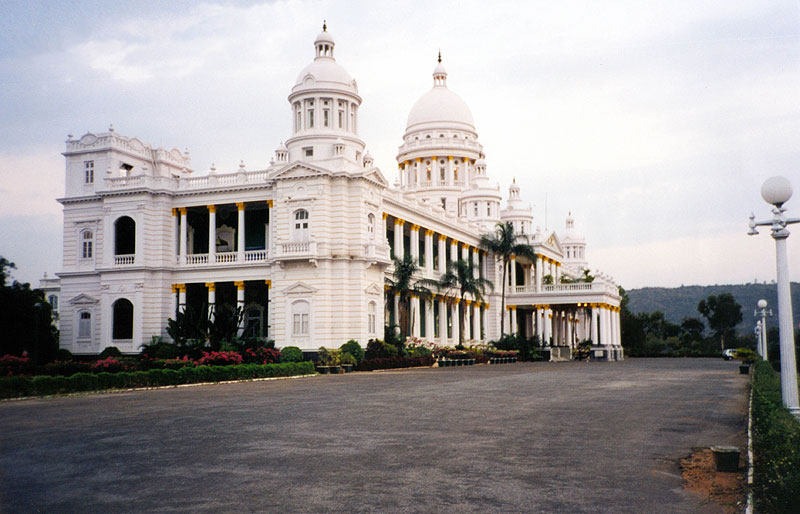
Lalitha Mahal, where the flashback portions were partly shot.

The film's team continued filming at Melukote, Lalitha Mahal and in the backwaters of the Krishna Raja Sagara among others. Samantha completed filming her portions on 22 February 2014. By late March 2014, the entire filming, except for a song sequence, was completed; the song was planned to be shot in April 2014 Featuring Nagarjuna and Naga Chaitanya, it was shot at Annapurna Studios in mid-April 2014. Amitabh Bachchan announced that filming for his cameo appearance has been completed.

Saran later revealed in an interview that during the shoot at Coorg, the team's day began at 4:30 am every day. She visited coffee plantation and black pepper farms to observe the farmers' work for her part. For a few particular scenes, where Saran teaches Nagarjuna some farm chores, the team made a few takes, as Nagajuna, being a quick learner, completed the tasks better than Saran.

== Themes and influences ==
The film was initially rumoured to be inspired by the American science fiction comedy film Back to the Future. It was also compared with an older Hindi film Kal Aaj Aur Kal (1971) for its casting.

Nagarjuna revealed that the film is set over a period of a hundred years, up until 2013, and involves reincarnation. He said in an interview that the film's script is not particularly intense, but has a light narration. The film's basic theme, established by Kumar and his assistant directors, was "that things have changed and our sorrows and joys have been exchanged; Night and day, morning and evening, a movement of souls united in being, cosmic beings rearranged. Some things may go wrong in one's life but they are corrected in the other life. The universe and nature correct the mistakes made in one life, in the other." He said that this statement would seem complex but would be fully explained by the film.

Nagarjuna added that the film's characters would reborn with no special purpose unlike other reincarnation films like Janaki Ramudu (1988), Arundhati (2009) and Magadheera (2009). Saran said in an interview that the film basically has a family-oriented theme and is about falling in love with "small, little things that you sort of don't see every day, but are really, really important". Unlike other reincarnation based films, the film's story develops two separate themes – the relationship between reborn lovers, but also the relationship between reborn parents and their children. Naga Chaitanya acknowledged in an interview with The Hindu that the film's script might seem to have a few overly-convenient coincidences, but felt that Kumar's detailing in every scene made the script believable.

== Music ==
The soundtrack features five songs as well as a theme musical piece all composed by Anoop Rubens. Chandrabose wrote lyrics for three songs and the remaining two were written by Vanamali and Rubens himself. Aditya Music acquired the audio rights and released the soundtrack on 9 May 2014 on YouTube. The soundtrack received positive response, especially for the songs Kanulanu Thaake and Chinni Chinni Aasalu.

== Release ==
Nagarjuna planned to release the film on 31 March 2014, on the eve of Ugadi, (Note: Ugadi is the New Year's Day for the people of the Deccan region of India. It falls on a different day every year because the Hindu calendar is a lunisolar calendar.) confirmed on a visit to the Tirumala Venkateswara Temple with Akhil in early March 2014. However, he later postponed the film's release, planning to release the film after the 2014 general elections. The film's trailer confirmed the release date as 23 May 2014. The film was confirmed to feature in both Dolby Atmos and 5.1 surround sound systems. On 14 May 2014, the Central Board of Film Certification passed the film with a U/A certificate instead of a U certificate that the makers expected because of a few drinking scenes. The British Board of Film Classification passed the film with a PG rating due to "brief images of injury, mild bad language".

Nagarjuna arranged a special premiere show on 22 May 2014 at Prasads IMAX for Nageswara Rao's fans. He succumbed to the huge demand from the admirers of Nageswara Rao and changed the single screen premiere into a five-multiplex screen red carpet show at Prasads IMAX, playing host to thousands of celebrity invitees. CineGalaxy Inc. stated that the film would release in more than 100 screens in the United States alone with advance ticketing commencing at few locations. The film's release however clashed with Vikrama Simha, the Telugu dubbed version of Kochadaiiyaan (2014).

Nagarjuna planned to release the film in more than 1000 screens in India as well as international markets. In India, 171 theatres in Nizam, (Note: For film trade purpose, the Nizam region includes the three districts of Kalaburagi, Bidar, and Raichur in Karnataka and seven districts in the Marathwada region including Aurangabad, Latur, Nanded, Parbhani, Beed, Jalna and Osmanabad apart from the state of Telangana.) 95 theatres in Ceded, 50 theatres in Vishakhapatnam, 85 theatres in East and West Godavari districts, 40 theatres in Krishna, 45 theatres in Guntur, 25 theatres in Nellore, 12 screens in Chennai, 20 screens in Bangalore and 25 screens in Maharashtra were booked. In overseas, 108 screens in the United States, 9 screens in Toronto, 6 screens in Germany, 2 screens in Switzerland and 3 screens in Netherlands were booked. The advance ticket booking was made available both online as well as in theatres five days before the film's release. It registered nearly 50% advance booking by 22 May 2014 and was expected to register more than 75% before its theatrical release. It was also dubbed and released in Tamil and Hindi under the same title.

=== Distribution ===
Sudhakar Reddy acquired the distribution rights of the film in Nizam Region. CineGalaxy Inc. acquired the entire overseas theatrical screening rights of the film. Lorgan Entertainments acquired the film's distribution rights for Australia and New Zealand. DBB Films later acquired the theatrical screening rights of the film in all European countries except the United Kingdom, where Errabus Films was the distributor.

=== Promotion ===
The first look poster of the film was unveiled by Nagarjuna on 19 September 2013 on the eve of Nageswara Rao's 90th birthday. The poster featured Nagarjuna dressed in a black suit, Chaitanya sitting in a throne as an elder in traditional costume and Nageswara Rao sitting on the floor posing as a child. The poster received praise for its offbeat theme. The theatrical trailer of the film was planned to be released on 11 April 2014. The second poster was released on 31 March 2014 on the eve of Ugadi. A special video named "Candid Moments" was released along with the theatrical trailer as a tribute to Nageswara Rao on 8 April 2014 on the eve of Sri Rama Navami. The trailer began with a voiceover of Nageswara Rao and ends with the message "ANR Lives On".

Upon release, the trailer went viral, praised as "refreshing". IndiaGlitz stated "The trailer looks very refreshing and promising. In overall, the trailer looks very delightful, colourful and loaded with entertainment. Hope the movie will be a befitting farewell for the great actor Akkineni Nageswara Rao" and gave it the verdict "Refreshing, Vibrant and Vivid". Oneindia Entertainment stated "The trailer of Manam shows that the movie has amazing background score, stunning camera work, breath-taking exotic locales, wonderful performances by the lead actors". The trailer was also screened in theatres screening Race Gurram (2014) on 11 April 2014. The trailer garnered approximately 650,000 views on YouTube in just two days. Nagarjuna released the promo of the song Piyo Piyo Re on 26 April 2014. It featured Nagarjuna and Chaitanya dancing in a pub. It became a viral video post its release.

After the audio launch, the positive reception of the song Chinni Chinni Aasalu prompted the makers to release a video featuring the making of the song. Shot in the backdrop of a village, the song featured Nagarjuna dressed as a farmer while Shriya Saran was dressed as an innocent villager. On the other hand, the video showcased the recording of the song by Shreya Ghoshal. The video too received positive response. A still featuring Chaitanya and Samantha in an intimate sequence from the flashback was re-tweeted many times by the fans and Telugu film websites. A short teaser, 31 seconds long, was unveiled on 13 May 2014, in which Samantha was seen speaking about Nageshwar continuously at a doctor's check up and the montage of the film's male leads being played side by side.

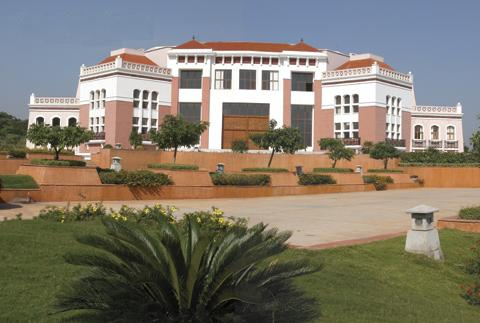
Shilpakala Vedika, where the film's 100-day celebrations were held on 22 September 2014.

A behind-the-scenes video of the making of the song Kanulanu Thaake was released on 14 May 2014. The song featured Chaitanya and Samantha as a newly married couple and their onscreen romance with Lavanya Tripathi making a brief glimpse towards the end. It also showcased the recording of the song by Arijit Singh. The video received a positive response, with praises directed towards the on-screen chemistry between Chaitanya and Samantha. The audio launch event, entitled "Manam Sangeetham", was aired on 18 May 2014 in Gemini TV at 5:00 pm, with the Akkineni family in attendance.

Tata DoCoMo & Brooke Bond Red Label were involved with the film, advertising on hoardings, television, radio, in print, and on buses, among other venues. Tata DoCoMo came up with the tagline "Be a part of the Manam family" and offered a chance to the meet the film's star cast by recharging with a certain amount. Brooke Bond used the slogan "Red Label celebrates the taste of togetherness with Manam" and offered a chance to meet Nagarjuna. First Show Digital handled the film's online promotions. On September 22, 2014, a celebration marking the film's 100th day of release was held in Shilpakala Vedika, Hyderabad.

=== Leak ===
In early March 2014, the film was leaked into the Internet. Two people related to the film leakage were arrested on 8 March 2014. They were identified as Mubashir Sheik and Sheik Abid Basha hailing from Guntur. Basha illegally accessed the feed of the film and handed it over to Sheik who then uploaded it on YouTube. Post release, the film became one of the most downloaded titles in recent times and the Anti-Video Piracy team worked for a week since the film's release to reduce the effect of this leak on the film's gross.

=== Home media ===
The television broadcast rights were sold to Gemini TV for ₹80 million. The film was planned for a television premiere on 20 September 2014 on the eve of Nageswara Rao's birthday. The film registered a TRP rating of 15.62 making it one of the highest TRPs ever registered for a film in 2014. Reliance Home Video released the film's DVDs and Blu-ray discs in December 2014.

== Reception ==
=== Critical reception ===
The film received positive reviews from critics who called it a beautiful film and a complete entertainer, according to International Business Times India. Prabalika M. Borah of The Hindu praised the performances of the film's cast, the work of the technical crew, and Kumar's execution of the film's script in narrating a complex story without confusion. She summarised, "The smile and laughter will not leave you while it still manage to moisten your eyes here and there". Sandhya Rao of Sify stated, "Manam's story is something new within Telugu films context, but the way the film showcases romance and emotion, it is far from a regular fare. Go watch Manam, a complete entertainer, which will surely enthrall!". She recognised Nageswara Rao as the pillar of the film and termed his performance as an "outstanding" one.

Shekhar Hooli of Oneindia Entertainment gave the film 4 out of 5 stars, stating "Manam is a perfect family entertainer and it is director Vikram Kumar's unique script that makes the movie a brilliant experiment. The movie is high on entertainment quotient and it is treat to see ANR, Nagarjuna and Naga Chaitanya together on screen." Rajasekhar S of Cinemalead also gave the film 4 out of 5 stars and called it "classy and brilliant", stating "Vikram K Kumar has packed the movie in such a way that the audience never get bored. Especially the last 20 minutes of the movie, towards the climax brings us to the edge of the seat." IndiaGlitz gave the film 4 out of 5 stars as well, and called the film a "complete entertainer that is more than a love story" and stated, "The film packs everything that the trailer promised, plus the not-quite-unknown formula of Past Life Regression. Although we have seen many PLR stories in the past, 'Manam' is special because of its sublime and intriguing nature."

Karthik Pasupulate of The Times of India gave the film 3.5 out of 5 stars and wrote, "You cannot appreciate the smarts in the script has been written, and how humorously it all gets translated onscreen without getting unduly melodramatic. Since this is ANR's last film, the cumulative nostalgia and feel goodness of the movie might just paper over the structural issues. It's definitely worth a watch." Suresh Kavirayani of Deccan Chronicle also gave the film 3.5 out of 5 stars and wrote, "Vikram Kumar has come out with a nice story and screenplay and created a classic masterpiece. Though there are past life regressions and rebirths, the director's intelligent screenplay makes you to see more comfortably without any confusion. Manam is a good film to watch and a fitting tribute to Akkineni Nageswara Rao."

=== Box office ===
The film achieved an average 95% occupancy in both single screens and multiplexes during the morning and matinee shows on its opening day, increasing during the evening and night shows. The film collected ₹3.21 crore worldwide on its first day according to trade analyst Taran Adarsh. It collected more than ₹11.26 crore net worldwide in three days and topped the Tollywood business chart, beating Vikrama Simha. In four days, the film collected ₹14.9 crore worldwide. By the end of its first week, the film collected ₹19 crore worldwide. The film collected ₹26.71 crore net in 10 days worldwide.

The film collected ₹32.75 crore net worldwide by the end of the 19th day of its theatrical run. By mid June 2014, the film crossed the ₹35 crore mark worldwide, and was expected to reach the ₹40 crore mark. The film crossed $1.5 million gross at the US box office by the end of its fourth weekend. By late July 2014, after completing its 50-day run, it had amassed a ₹48 crore revenue, including satellite rights and audio rights. The film collected ₹36.5 crore share worldwide during its lifetime, becoming one of the highest grossing Telugu films of 2014. The film's success was attributed to Nagarjuna's strategy of releasing the film on a limited number of screens, and utilising a low budget according to IANS.

==== India ====
The film collected a share of ₹2.23 crore on its first day at AP/Nizam box office. The film collected its highest share of ₹91 lakh in the Nizam region, followed by the Ceded region with ₹39 lakh and ₹22 lakh in Vishakhapatnam. It collected ₹1.6 crore and ₹3 lakh in Karnataka and the rest of India respectively. The film collected ₹4.02 crore at the Indian box office in two days. The film collected ₹6.22 crore at the AP/Nizam box office and ₹80 lakh in the rest of India by the end of its first weekend. The film again collected its highest share of ₹2.67 crore in the Nizam region, followed by the Ceded region with ₹1.06 crore and Vishakhapatnam with ₹62 lakh. Adarsh reported that the film collected a share of ₹8.92 crore in four days at the Indian box office.

It collected ₹12.22 crore at the AP/Nizam box office, ₹1.48 crore at the Karnataka box office, and ₹30 lakh in the rest of India by the end of its first week. The film collected ₹3.94 crore net at the AP/Nizam box office and ₹58 lakh in the rest of India by the end of its second weekend. It collected ₹21.87 crore in AP/Nizam and ₹2.11 crore in the rest of India by the end of its 19-day run. The film company held celebrations after the completion of its 50-day run on 14 July 2014. The film completed a 100-day run on 30 August 2014.

==== Overseas ====
The film collected ₹53 lakh from 69 screens at its premiere in the United States. The premiere was held on Thursday, 22 May 2014. According to Taran Adarsh, the collections made by the film from its premiere show was a "phenomenal" start. The film collected ₹3.33 crore in three days in the United States with many screens still yet to report as of 25 May 2014. The film collected ₹4.96 crore on 108 screens as of 27 May 2014, in the United States. With this, Manam became the film with the highest grossing opening weekend for Nagarjuna and Chaitanya in the United States, and also became the third-highest grosser for an opening weekend in the country in 2014, after 1: Nenokkadine and Race Gurram. The film crossed the US$1 million mark by the end of its first four-day weekend.

The film collected ₹62.6 million in six days, thus surpassing the ₹5.93 crore nine-day extended first week collections of Race Gurram in the United States. According to Adarsh, the film continued to do good business in the United States by collecting ₹6.45 crore by the end of its first week. The film continued its successful run in the United States through early June 2014 and collected ₹8.2 crore. With this, the film broke the record set by Race Gurram and became the second highest grosser in 2014 after 1: Nenokkadine. The film surpassed the lifetime collections of 1: Nenokkadine at the United States box office in 14 days by collecting ₹8.33 crore.

The film collected ₹8.77 crore in the United States in 19 days. By mid June 2014, the film collected ₹9.11 crore in the United States, and by the end of its 25-day run and crossed the US$1.5 million mark, becoming one of the biggest commercially successful Tollywood films in the country.

== Awards and nominations ==
Ceremony	Category	Nominee	Result
62nd Filmfare Awards South	Best Film – Telugu	Akkineni Family	Won
62nd Filmfare Awards South	Best Director – Telugu	Vikram Kumar	Won
62nd Filmfare Awards South	Best Music Director – Telugu	Anoop Rubens	Won
62nd Filmfare Awards South	Best Lyricist – Telugu	Chandrabose for "Kani Penchina Maa Ammake"	Won
62nd Filmfare Awards South	Best Cinematographer – South	P. S. Vinod	Won
62nd Filmfare Awards South	Best Actor – Telugu	Nagarjuna	Nominated
62nd Filmfare Awards South	Best Actress – Telugu	Samantha Ruth Prabhu	Nominated
62nd Filmfare Awards South	Best Supporting Actress – Telugu	Shriya Saran	Nominated
62nd Filmfare Awards South	Best Male Playback Singer – Telugu	Arijit Singh for "Kanulanu Thaake Kala"	Nominated
62nd Filmfare Awards South	Best Female Playback Singer – Telugu	Shreya Ghoshal for "Chinni Chinni Aasalu"	Nominated
62nd Filmfare Awards South	Best Lyricist – Telugu	Vanamali for "Kanulanu Thaake Kala"	Nominated
5th TSR TV9 National Film Awards	Best Actress	Shriya Saran	Won
5th TSR TV9 National Film Awards	Special Jury Awards – Best Actor	Nagarjuna	Won
4th South Indian International Movie Awards	Best Film – Telugu	Akkineni Family	Won
4th South Indian International Movie Awards	Best Actor – Telugu (Critics)	Naga Chaitanya	Won
4th South Indian International Movie Awards	Best Actress – Telugu (Critics)	Samantha Ruth Prabhu	Won
4th South Indian International Movie Awards	Best Supporting Actress – Telugu	Shriya Saran	Won
4th South Indian International Movie Awards	Best Music Director – Telugu	Anoop Rubens	Won
4th South Indian International Movie Awards	Best Lyricist – Telugu	Chandrabose for "Kani Penchina Maa Ammake"	Won
4th South Indian International Movie Awards	Best Director – Telugu	Vikram Kumar	Nominated
4th South Indian International Movie Awards	Best Actor – Telugu	Naga Chaitanya	Nominated
4th South Indian International Movie Awards	Best Actress – Telugu	Samantha Ruth Prabhu	Nominated
4th South Indian International Movie Awards	Best Cinematographer – Telugu	P. S. Vinod	Nominated
4th South Indian International Movie Awards	Best Male Playback Singer – Telugu	Arijit Singh for "Kanulanu Thaake Kala"	Nominated
4th South Indian International Movie Awards	Best Male Playback Singer – Telugu	Bharath for "Kani Penchina Maa Ammake"	Nominated
4th South Indian International Movie Awards	Best Female Playback Singer – Telugu	Shreya Ghoshal for "Chinni Chinni Aasalu"	Nominated
4th South Indian International Movie Awards	Best Lyricist – Telugu	Vanamali for "Kanulanu Thaake Kala"	Nominated
13th Santosham Film Awards	Best Film	Akkineni Family	Won
13th Santosham Film Awards	Best Director	Vikram Kumar	Won
13th Santosham Film Awards	Best Actress	Shriya Saran	Won
13th Santosham Film Awards	Best Music Director	Anoop Rubens	Won
13th Santosham Film Awards	Best Dialogue	Harsha Vardhan	Won
11th CineMAA Awards	Best Film (Jury)	Akkineni Family	Won
11th CineMAA Awards	Best Actress	Samantha Ruth Prabhu	Won
11th CineMAA Awards	Best Music Director	Anoop Rubens	Won
11th CineMAA Awards	Best Fight Master	Ram Lakshman	Won
11th CineMAA Awards	Best Outstanding Actor	Nagarjuna	Won

== Legacy ==
Celebrities like S. S. Rajamouli, Shobu Yarlagadda, Nani, K. Dasaradh, Manchu Manoj, Pooja Hegde, Allu Sirish, Deva Katta, Adivi Sesh, Rakul Preet Singh, Rana Daggubati, Gopimohan, Prakash Raj, Allu Arjun, and Mahesh Babu praised the film. Director Ram Gopal Varma called Manam an "avant garde product but deeply rooted in earth" and "the first constructive demonstration that Tollywood actually can go into a new age of cinema". He added that both Nagarjuna and Vikram deserved multiple salutes for making a film like Manam, and the only tragedy was that Nageswara Rao was not alive to see this film, which Varma termed an "astounding celebration of human emotions". Ram Charan called Manam a film that induces "Love, joy, passion, hatred, excitement and almost every feeling you can imagine and more". Kamal Haasan watched the film on 29 May 2014, at a special screening in Chennai. Haasan became emotional and could not control his tears. Regarding this, he said "I have always been a fan of ANR and this film has brought back very fond memories. I turned emotional when I saw ANR on the big screen. I wholeheartedly appreciate the Akkineni family for paying tribute to ANR in this manner."

IndiaGlitz called Manam, along with 1: Nenokkadine and Drushyam, the best experimental films in recent times. Manam, along with Minugurulu (2014), was nominated by the Telugu Film Producers Council to the Film Federation of India to be included on the list of 30 Indian films for the 87th Academy Awards, in the category of Best Foreign Language Film. In late September 2014, the United States postal department released a stamp in honour of Nageswara Rao, making him the first Indian actor in whose name a postal stamp had been released. That stamp featured a still of Nageswara Rao from the film. The film was screened at the 45th International Film Festival of India on 29 November 2014, as a Homage to Nageswara Rao. In February 2015, the makers of Bandipotu (2015) released a poster featuring Sampoornesh Babu, Allari Naresh and Saptagiri, whose theme resembled the first look of Manam. During the promotions of Theeran Adhigaram Ondru (2017), Karthi, speaking about the adaptation of the film in Tamil, said that "it is a fascinating idea to work with my father (Sivakumar) and brother (Suriya)", but he felt that "a lot of things needed to fall in place in order to materialise".
