= Chinnadana Nee Kosam =

- Film poster
- Directed by: A. Karunakaran
- Written by: A. Karunakaran
- Produced by: N. Sudhakar Reddy; Nikita Reddy
- Starring: Nithiin; Mishti
- Cinematography: I. Andrew
- Edited by: Prawin Pudi
- Music by: Anup Rubens
- Production company: Sresht Movies
- Distributed by: Asian Movies & CineGalaxy Inc. (Overseas)
- Release date: 25 December 2014
- Running time: 140 minutes
- Language: Telugu
- Budget: ₹16 crore (US$1.7 million)

Chinnadana Nee Kosam (transl. For you, Darling) is a Telugu-language romantic comedy film written and directed by A. Karunakaran. The film features Nithiin and Mishti, marking the latter's debut in Telugu cinema. The film's title was taken from a song in Nithin's 2012 film Ishq. The film was produced by Nithin's father N. Sudhakar Reddy and sister Nikhita Reddy under the banner Sresht Movies. Harsha Vardhan wrote the film's dialogues. Anup Rubens composed the film's soundtrack and background score. I. Andrew and Prawin Pudi were the film's cinematographer and editor respectively.

Production began on 21 May 2014. Principal photography began on 2 June 2014. The film released on 25 December 2014 with mixed reviews and was moderately successful.

== Plot ==
Nithin (Nithiin) is a happy-go-lucky boy with a happy family. He saves a girl from goons in a train and happens to befriend Reddy Garu (Nassar), who happens to be traveling in the same train. Afterwards, Nithin sees Nandini (Mishti) in a chance encounter and falls in love with her. He tries to woo her with various ways, but in vain. Meanwhile, Nandini wants to rent the penthouse of Reddy Garu and takes help from Nithin to secure the place. As friendship grows between Nithin and Nandini, one day suddenly Nandini takes Reddy Garu to Barcelona on a pretext of Europe trip, without informing Nithin. It is later revealed that Reddy Garu is the grandfather of Nandini and wants to unite him with her mother, who have been separated for past several years due to a strained relationship. In search of Nandini, Nithin arrives in Barcelona and starts irritating her as he feels that Nandini has cheated him. How does Nithin help Nandini unite Reddy Garu with his daughter? How does he win back the heart of Nandini? This forms the rest of the story.

== Cast ==
- Nithiin as Nithin
- Mishti as Nandini
- Nassar as Reddy
- Naresh as Nithin's father
- Sithara as Nithin's mother
- Ali as Rahul
- Navika Kotia as Nithin's younger sister
- Rohini as Nandini's mother
- Madhunandan as a gay thief
- Josh Ravi as a gay thief
- Dhanya Balakrishna as Nandini's friend
- Thagubothu Ramesh
- Raghu Karumanchi as Police Officer
- Pawan Kalyan as cowboy (archived footage from "Yeh Chikitha" from Badri)

== Production ==
A. Karunakaran announced his next film with Nithiin post the release of the latter's film Heart Attack (2014). Nithiin's sister Nikitha Reddy and father Sudhakar Reddy bankrolled the film under the banner Sresht Movies. Mishti was finalized as the female lead of the film marking her Telugu debut. She said that the film will be a romantic entertainer with a thriller element in it. The film had its official launch on 21 May 2014 at Hyderabad. I. Andrew was signed as the cinematographer, Anoop Rubens was signed as the music director and Harsha Vardhan penned the film's dialogues.

Principal photography began on 2 June 2014 at Hyderabad. The first schedule came to an end on 12 June 2014. On 31 July 2014, the film's second schedule was wrapped up with which 50% of the film's shoot was complete. The film's title was announced as Chinnadana Nee Kosam on 5 August 2014 which happens to be the name of a song from the film Ishq (2012). In early September 2014, the film's unit traveled to Barcelona for a 35 days schedule where crucial scenes and songs on the lead pair were planned to be shot. The film was predominantly shot in Switzerland and the film's unit returned to Hyderabad nearly on 11 October 2014. The first look poster along with a teaser was unveiled on 24 October 2014 on the occasion of Diwali.

The film reached the final stages of production in the fourth week of October 2014 and dubbing works were carried out simultaneously. On 27 November 2014, Nithiin's father Sudhakar Reddy stated that the filming has been completed and post-production activities began. The theatrical trailer was unveiled on 28 November 2014. Pawan Kalyan was reported to make a cameo appearance in the film which both Karunakaran and Nithiin denied those reports as rumors but added that Nithiin will be seen as Pawan Kalyan's fan in the film. Mishti described her character as a witty and intelligent girl named Nandini and said that her co-star Dhanya Balakrishna and the assistant directors helped her in pronouncing Telugu correctly.

== Music ==
Chinnadana Nee Kosam

Soundtrack album by Anup Rubens
- Released: 27 November 2014
- Recorded: 2014
- Genre: Feature film soundtrack
- Length: 22:50
- Language: Telugu
- Label: Aditya Music
- Producer: Anup Rubens

Anup Rubens chronology
Pilla Nuvvu Leni Jeevitham (2014)	Chinnadana Nee Kosam (2014)	Temper (2015)

Anoop Rubens composed the film's soundtrack and background score. The soundtrack consists of 6 songs all written by Krishna Chaitanya and composed by Rubens. The release date was confirmed as 27 November 2014 by Nithiin. Aditya Music acquired the audio rights. Nagarjuna was invited as the chief guest for the audio launch event held at Shilpakala Vedika.

All lyrics are written by Krishna Chaitanya.

No.	Title	Artist(s)	Length
1.	"Chinnadana Nee Kosam"	Raja Hasan	3:59
2.	"Ooh La La"	Anoop Rubens	3:54
3.	"Everybody Chalo All I Wanna Say"	Jaspreet Jasz, Anudeep Dev, Dhanunjay, Hymath	3:19
4.	"Dil Dil Dil"	Rahul Sipligunj	4:02
5.	"Mundhugane"	Ramya Behra	3:29
6.	"Albeli"	Simha, Jhanvi Narang	4:07
Total length:			22:50

=== Reception ===
Reviewing the soundtrack, Sasidhar A. S. of The Times of India rated the album 3 out of 5 and called it a feel good album. IndiaGlitz rated the soundtrack 3 out of 5 and stated "Anup Rubens gives an album that his previous films with Nithin stood testimony to". The platinum disc was launched at Sri Venkateswara University in Tirupati on 19 December 2014.

== Release ==
The film was initially planned for a release on 19 December 2014. Later it was postponed to 25 December 2014 as a Christmas release. Asian Movies & CineGalaxy Inc., acquired the overseas theatrical rights.
