= Adda (2013 film) =

- Directed by: G. S. Karthik Reddy
- Story by: G. S. Karthik Reddy
- Produced by: Anumolu Naga Susheela; Chintalapudi Srinivasa Rao
- Starring: Sushanth; Shanvi
- Cinematography: S. Arun Kumar
- Music by: Anup Rubens
- Production company: Sri Nag Corporation
- Release date: 15 August 2013
- Country: India
- Language: Telugu

Adda is a 2013 Indian Telugu-language action film directed by G. S. Karthik Reddy and jointly produced by Chintalapudi Srinivasarao and Sushanth's mother, Anumolu Naga Susheela, under Sri Nag Corporation. It featured Sushanth and Shanvi in the lead roles.

== Plot ==
Abhi (Sushanth) is a young man who provides a unique service - that of creating rifts between couples. He provides this service mostly to the couples’ parents. He builds crevices between lovebirds who plan to marry against the wishes of their parents and gets paid big bucks for his services. But when he wants to, he also helps those in love and even helps them get married.

The marriage registration office is his Adda or office and he operates from there. Into this playboy's life enters Priya (Shanvi), and she seeks the help of Abhi to separate her sister and her boyfriend because her father Patel (Nagineedu) does not approve of their relationship and will go to any lengths to punish them. So she decides to break them up using Abhi's services.

In the process of a breakup, Abhi falls in love with Priya. However, Priya keeps off Abhi as he is too money-minded. She feels Abhi is a guy without feelings and morals. Also, she is engaged to be married to her cousin, Deva (Dev Gill). The rest of the film shows how Abhi chases her and gets her to fall for him.

== Cast ==
- Sushanth as Abhinav
- Shanvi as Priya
- Dev Gill as Deva, Priya's cousin
- Kota Srinivasa Rao
- Raghu Babu
- Thagubothu Ramesh
- Dhanraj
- Tanikella Bharani
- Venu Madhav
- Nagineedu as Patel
- Venu Yeldandi
- Swapnika
- Sudigali Sudheer
- Jaya Prakash Reddy
- Suhasini as Pooja
- Srinivas Avasarala as Kishore
- Fish Venkat
- Randhir Gattla
- Shweta Bhardwaj (item song "Pareshan Hay Oolala")

== Soundtrack ==
The title song of this film (Yehi Hai Mera Adda) was released at IPL match during the match between Sunrisers Hyderabad and Royal Challengers Bangalore on 7 April 2013 at the Uppal Hyderabad, which was composed by Anoop Rubens and sung by Baba Sehgal. The song was launched formally in the presence of Sushanth director Sai Karthik Reddy producers Nagasusheela and Chintalapudi Srinivasa Rao.

=== Track list ===
The film's music was composed by Anup Rubens and Released by Junglee Music.

Adda

Soundtrack album by Anup Rubens
- Released: Jun 21, 2013
- Recorded: 2013
- Genre: Soundtrack
- Length: 27:31
- Label: Junglee Music
- Producer: Anup Rubens

Anup Rubens chronology
Lovely (2012)	Adda (2013)	Sukumarudu (2013)

No.	Title	Lyrics	Artist(s)	Length
1.	"Yahi Hai Mera Addaa"	Krishna Chaitanya	Baba Sehgal, Prithvi, Dhanunjay, Ramky	4:14
2.	"Ninne Ninne Chusthunte"	Sri Mani	Nikhil D'Souza, Chaitra	4:00
3.	"Hay Mister Hay Mister"	Ramajogayya Sastry	Suchitra, Dhanunjay	4:04
4.	"Enduke Enduke"	Sri Mani	Sreeram Chandra	4:05
5.	"Pareshan Hay Oolala"	Ramajogayya Sastry	Ritu Pathak, Santhosh, Ramki	3:54
6.	"Ekkada Unna Nee"	Ananta Sriram	Vijay Prakash	3:24
7.	"Adda Rubens Club Mix"	Krishna Chaitanya	Baba Sehgal, Prithvi, Dhanunjay, Ramky	3:50
Total length:				27:31

== Release ==
The film was released on 15 August 2013.

=== Reception ===
Jeevi of idlebrain.com gave a rating of 3/5 stating that The comedy and entertainment in the film is good. Plus points of the film are Sushanth, entertainment and music.
