= Loosu ponnu =

Tamil cinema stock character

The loosu ponnu (Tamil: லூசு பொண்ணு; transl. 'crazy girl') is a stock character in Tamil cinema, a girl who is portrayed as attractive but naïve and unintelligent. It is regarded as the equivalent of the Manic Pixie Dream Girl and dumb blonde stereotypes in the United States. The loosu ponnu trope became increasingly popular in 1990s Tamil cinema when the masculinity of the hero became severely overblown. It has since received criticism for being misogynistic and regressive.

== History and terminology ==
According to writer and critic Baradwaj Rangan, the 'loosu ponnu' trope emerged in an era where Tamil filmmakers began casting North Indian women, who could not speak Tamil, in leading roles; due to their lip syncing not being perfect (their lines would be dubbed over by others), wild gesticulation and their emotional reactions seeming unusual, "all of this ended up making them look like mad people". The concentration of loosu ponnu characters decreased by the late 2010s, with many actresses who played such characters early in their career choosing to instead play stronger and more independent women instead.

== Characteristics ==
Loosu ponnus are typically depicted as being bubbly, naïve, childish, lacking professional ambition, having easily detachable ties with their families, and showing unquestioning devotion to heroic males once they fall in love with them. They are also depicted as angelic, in need of constant rescuing, and incapable of doing even simple things in life. Very often, their "cuteness" is directly proportional to how insane their actions may seem to viewers.

== Examples ==
Known loosu ponnu characters in Tamil films are:

Character	Actress	Film	Ref.
Anjali	Amala	Agni Natchathiram (1988)	
Suji	Meera Jasmine	Pudhiya Geethai (2003)	
Mythili	Jyothika	Manmadhan (2004)	
Hema	Meera Jasmine	Sandakozhi (2005)	
Haritha	Nayanthara	Kalvanin Kadhali (2006)	
Hasini	Genelia D'Souza	Santosh Subramaniam (2008)	
Devi	Trisha Krishnan	Kuruvi (2008)	
Jahnavi	Nayanthara	Villu (2009)	
Poornima	Tamannaah Bhatia	Sura (2010)	
Keerthana	Nazriya	Raja Rani (2013)	
Liyana	Chandini Sreedharan	Ainthu Ainthu Ainthu (2013)	
Anitha	Taapsee Pannu	Arrambam (2013)	
Chitra Devipriya	Kajal Aggarwal	All in All Azhagu Raja (2013)	
Yazhini	Hansika Motwani	Maan Karate (2014)	
Ankitha	Samantha Ruth Prabhu	Kaththi (2014)	
Sowmya	Kajal Aggarwal	Paayum Puli (2015)	
Shakeela	Samantha Ruth Prabhu	10 Endrathukulla (2015)	
Swetha	Shruti Haasan	Vedalam (2015)	
Priya	Hansika Motwani	Uyire Uyire (2016)	
Saroja	Keerthy Suresh	Thodari (2016)	
Kavya	Keerthy Suresh	Remo (2016)	
Priya	Rakul Preet Singh	Theeran Adhigaram Ondru (2017)	
Vandhana	Sayyeshaa	Ghajinikanth (2018)	
Sembaruthi	Keerthy Suresh	Sandakozhi 2 (2018)	
"Aarathu" Anandhi	Sai Pallavi	Maari 2 (2018)	
Padmini	Priyanka Arul Mohan	Doctor (2021)	

=== Other languages ===
Besides Tamil films, loosu ponnu characters were also noted in Telugu films (known as 'pichi pilla'). Known characters in Telugu films are:

Character	Actress	Film	Ref.
Hasini	Genelia D'Souza	Bommarillu (2006)	
Jaanu	Genelia D'Souza	Orange (2010)	
Chaitra	Megha Akash	LIE (2017)	
Sarika	Shriya Saran	Paisa Vasool	
Harika	Musskan Sethi	Paisa Vasool	
Shalini	Rakul Preet Singh	Spyder (2017)	
Sukumari	Keerthy Suresh	Agnyaathavaasi (2018)	
Suryakantham	Anu Emmanuel	Agnyaathavaasi (2018)	
Samskruthi	Rashmika Mandanna	Sarileru Neekevvaru (2020)	

They were also noted in Kannada films with Nandini (Reeshma Nanaiah) in UI (2024).

== Criticism ==
The loosu ponnu trope has received wide criticism for being misogynistic and regressive. Actress Madonna Sebastian has expressed her dislike for it, saying, "I think it is disrespectful and when people endorse it, even heroines, it becomes a dangerous trend." Aishwarya Rajesh has consciously avoided playing such roles, citing her preference for "sensible" roles.

== See also ==
- Bimbo
- Ingénue
