= Uyire Uyire =

2016 Indian film by A. R. Rajasekar

- Theatrical release poster
- Directed by: A. R. Rajasekar
- Story by: Vikram Kumar
- Produced by: Jaya Prada
- Starring: Siddhu; Hansika Motwani
- Cinematography: R. D. Rajasekhar
- Edited by: Suraj Kavi
- Music by: Anup Rubens; Aravind–Shankar
- Production companies: Jayaprada Productions; Studio 9 Motion Pictures
- Distributed by: Eros International
- Release date: 1 April 2016
- Country: India
- Language: Tamil

Uyire Uyire (transl. Life, life) is a 2016 Indian Tamil-language romantic comedy drama film directed by A. Rajasekar and produced by Jaya Prada. A remake of the 2012 Telugu film Ishq, it stars Jaya Prada's nephew Siddhu and Hansika Motwani. The film was released in theatres on 1 April 2016.

== Cast ==
- Siddhu as Rahul
- Hansika Motwani as Priya
- Aadukalam Naren as Priya's father
- Ajay as Shiva
- Jagan as Rahul's friend
- Srinath as Shiva's co-worker
- Chaya Singh as Divya
- Rohini as an aunty at the wedding
- Uma as Priya's mother
- Meera Krishnan as Rahul's mother
- Supreeth

== Production ==
In June 2012, it was reported that Jaya Prada had acquired the Tamil remake rights of the 2012 Telugu film Ishq and would produce the remake with her nephew Siddhu in the lead role, while A. Rajasekhar, who previously directed Satyam, would direct the film. She had initially attempted to launch Siddhu through a bilingual venture titled Classmates in 2001, where he would feature alongside actresses Reema Sen, Yukta Mookhey and Dia Mirza, but the film did not materialise. He later made his acting debut in the Telugu film, Tapana (2004), co-starring Prabhu Deva. Filming for the Ishq remake, titled Uyire Uyire, was underway by December 2013 with Hansika Motwani, the lead actress, filming a song in Goa during a three-day schedule.

== Soundtrack ==
The music was composed by Anup Rubens and the duo Aravind–Shankar and released by Divo. All lyrics were written by Viveka.

Track listing
No.	Title	Music	Singer(s)	Length
1.	"Oh Priya Priya"	Anup Rubens	Adnan Sami, Chinmayi	4:29
2.	"Once Upon A Time"	Anup Rubens	Anup Rubens, Mukesh Mohamed, Ramya NSK	3:53
3.	"Devadhai Paarkiral"	Aravind–Shankar	Hariharan, Saindhavi	5:05
4.	"Listen To My Heart"	Aravind–Shankar	Javed Ali, Jaya Prada	4:29
5.	"Azhage Azhage"	Anup Rubens	Raja Hasan, Chinmayi	3:43
Total length:				21:39

== Release ==
Uyire Uyire was released in theatres on 1 April 2016, by Eros International. The film had its television premiere on 31 July 2016 via Zee Tamil.

== Reception ==
Baradwaj Rangan wrote for The Hindu that the film would appeal to fans of the loosu ponnu trope. Gautaman Bhaskaran of Hindustan Times called the film "unwatchable" and below average. M. Suganth from The Times of India wrote, "This is one of those films where every character acts/reacts in the most unrealistic and silliest manner to every situation". Sify criticised the film as a shot-for-shot remake and the lead actor's dialogue delivery but appreciated the cinematography.
