= Chukkalanti Ammayi Chakkanaina Abbayi =

- Directed by: Kanmani
- Written by: Raj Aditya
- Produced by: Rajkumar Harwani, Gogineni Srinivas
- Starring: Tarun; Vimala Raman; Dharmavarapu Subramanyam
- Edited by: Gautham Raju
- Music by: Anup Rubens
- Release date: 25 May 2013
- Country: India
- Language: Telugu

Chukkalanti Ammayi Chakkanaina Abbayi is a 2013 Indian Telugu-language romance film directed by Kanmani. It stars Tarun and Vimala Raman in the lead roles. The music was composed by Anup Rubens. The film's title is based on the song of the same name from Abhinandana (1988). The film was released after a three year delay.

== Plot ==
Sanjay, a carefree guy earning his income from a TV program in Bangkok comes across a medical student called Sameera and promptly woos her, asking her to live in with him, does Sameera agree and what lessons did Sanjay learn forms the basic crux of the plot.

== Cast ==
- Tarun as Sanjay
- Vimala Raman as Sameera
- Brahmanandam as Chhota Don
- Dharmavarapu Subramanyam as Landlord
- Pragathi as Sameera's aunt
- Chitram Srinu as Srinu
- Vijay Sai as Sunny
- Swathi Katrapati as Prema
- Y. Kasi Viswanath as Sanjay's father
- Raksha as Sanjay's mother
- Santosh Bapi
- Ananth Babu as Sanjay's boss

== Soundtrack ==
Anup Rubens has composed the original score and soundtracks for the film. The Music was Released by Aditya Music.

Chukkalanti Ammayi Chakkanaina Abbayi

Soundtrack album by Anup Rubens
- Released: 2013
- Recorded: 2013
- Genre: Soundtrack
- Length: 24:28
- Label: Aditya Music
- Producer: Anup Rubens

Anup Rubens chronology
Gunde Jaari Gallanthayyinde (2013)	Chukkalanti Ammayi Chakkanaina Abbayi (2013)	Bhimavaram Bullodu (2014)

Track list
No.	Title	Lyrics	Singer(s)	Length
1.	"Cheli Cheli"	Chinni Charan	Rahul Aggarwal, Sravana Bhargavi	4:16
2.	"Hello I Love You"	Rahaman	Anoop Rubens, Harshika	3:59
3.	"Kallulona Kallupetti"	Rahaman	Sri Krishna, Deepthi Madhuri	3:41
4.	"Kammani Oka Korika"	Rahaman	Shravani, Chorus	3:53
5.	"Dilse Jumorey"	Srinu	Baba Sehgal, Sravana Bhargavi	3:58
6.	"Premante Theeyani"	Srinu	Anoop Rubens, Chorus	3:58
Total length:				24:28

== Reception ==
A critic from The Times of India wrote that "Sanjay and Sameera sort out their problems, one after the other, but the audience watching the movie might find the problems of the pair in love too much of an ordeal to suffer".

== Home media ==
The film was telecast on Gemini TV on 26 July 2014 at 3 p.m.
