= Anup Rubens =

Indian film music composer (born 1983)

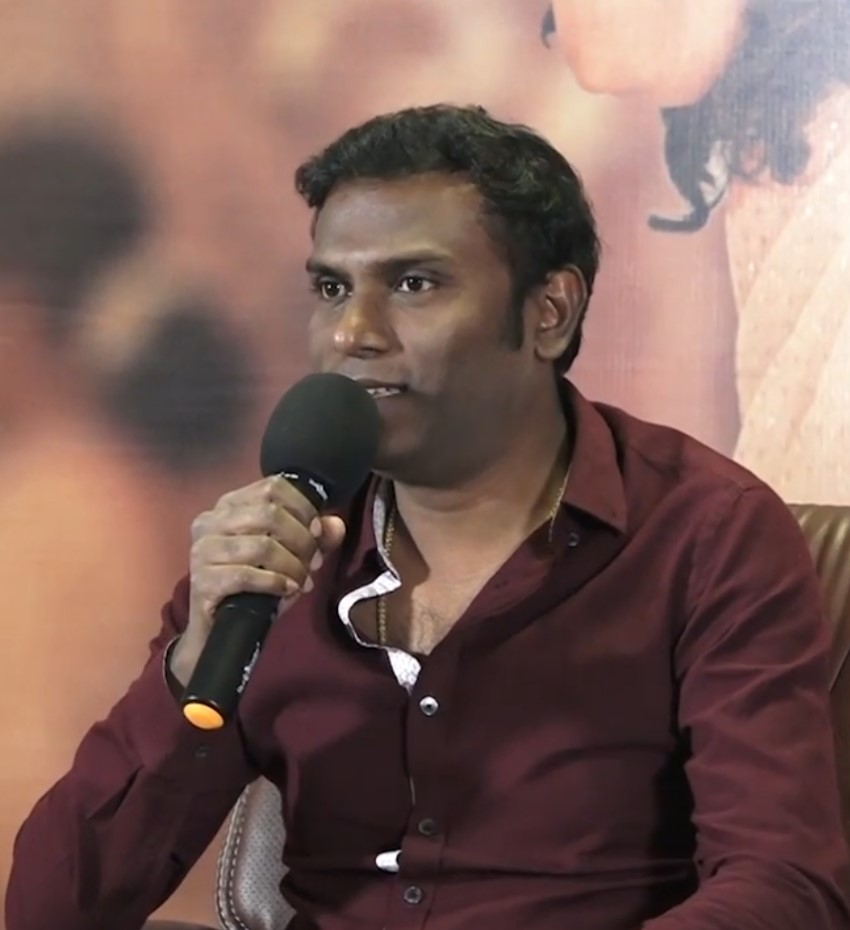
- Rubens in 2025

Background information
- Also known as: Anup Rubens
- Born: Enoch Rubens; 18 April 1980 (age 46); Hyderabad, Andhra Pradesh, India (now in Telangana, India)
- Genre: Film score
- Occupations: Composer, record producer, music director, singer
- Instruments: Vocals; keyboards; violin; flute; guitar; drum pads
- Years active: 2004–present

Anup Rubens (born 1983), birth name Enoch Rubens, is an Indian music composer and singer who predominantly works in Telugu cinema. He has received a Filmfare Award, a Nandhi Award, GAMA Awards and a SIIMA Award.

Rubens popular works include Gowtam SSC (2005), Prema Kavali (2011), Ishq (2012), Sukumarudu (2013), Gunde Jaari Gallanthayyinde (2013), Manam (2014), Gopala Gopala (2015), Temper (2015), Soggade Chinni Nayana (2016), Katamarayudu (2017), Nene Raju Nene Mantri (2017), Paisa Vasool (2017), 30 Rojullo Preminchadam Ela (2021), Drushyam 2 (2021) and Bangarraju (2022).

== Discography ==
=== Telugu films ===
Year	Title	Songs	Score	Notes
2004	Jai	Yes	Yes	
2005	Dhairyam	Yes	Yes	
2005	Gowtam SSC	Yes	Yes	
2006	Veedhi	Yes	Yes	
2006	Boss	No	Yes	
2007	Veduka	Yes	Yes	
2008	Idi Sangathi	No	Yes	
2009	Drona	Yes	Yes	
2009	House Full	Yes	Yes	
2009	Naa Style Veru	Yes	Yes	
2010	Seeta Ramula Kalyanam Lankalo	Yes	Yes	
2010	Andari Banduvaya	Yes	Yes	
2011	Nenu Naa Rakshasi	Yes	Yes	
2011	Prema Kavali	Yes	Yes	
2011	Kodipunju	Yes	Yes	
2012	Poola Rangadu	Yes	Yes	
2012	Ishq	Yes	Yes	
2012	Lovely	Yes	Yes	
2013	Adda	Yes	Yes	
2013	Sukumarudu	Yes	Yes	
2013	Jaffa	Yes	Yes	
2013	Gunde Jaari Gallanthayyinde	Yes	Yes	
2013	Chukkalanti Ammayi Chakkanaina Abbayi	Yes	Yes	
2014	Bhimavaram Bullodu	Yes	Yes	
2014	Pyar Mein Padipoyane	Yes	Yes	
2014	Manam	Yes	Yes	
2014	Autonagar Surya	Yes	Yes	
2014	Heart Attack	Yes	Yes	
2014	Oka Laila Kosam	Yes	Yes	
2014	Loukyam	Yes	Yes	
2014	Pilla Nuvvu Leni Jeevitham	Yes	Yes	
2014	Chinnadana Nee Kosam	Yes	Yes	
2015	Temper	Yes	No	
2015	Gopala Gopala	Yes	Yes	
2015	Vinavayya Ramayya	Yes	Yes	
2015	Akhil: The Power of Jua	Yes	Yes	
2015	Courier Boy Kalyan	Yes	No	
2015	Soukhyam	Yes	Yes	
2016	Soggade Chinni Nayana	Yes	Yes	
2016	Padesave	Yes	Yes	
2016	Aatadukundam Raa	Yes	Yes	
2016	Ism	Yes	Yes	
2017	Kittu Unnadu Jagratha	Yes	Yes	
2017	Katamarayudu	Yes	Yes	
2017	Nene Raju Nene Mantri	Yes	Yes	
2017	Paisa Vasool	Yes	Yes	
2017	Oollo Pelliki Kukkala Hadavidi	Yes	Yes	
2017	Hello	Yes	Yes	
2019	Sita	Yes	Yes	
2019	Vishwamitra	Yes	Yes	
2019	90ML	Yes	Yes	
2020	Orey Bujjiga	Yes	Yes	
2020	Expiry Date	Yes	Yes	Web series
2021	30 Rojullo Preminchadam Ela	Yes	Yes	
2021	Manchi Rojulochaie	Yes	Yes	
2021	House Arrest	Yes	Yes	
2021	Drushyam 2	Yes	Yes	
2022	Bangarraju	Yes	Yes	
2022	Malli Modalaindi	Yes	Yes	
2022	Shekar	Yes	Yes	
2022	Lucky Lakshman	Yes	Yes	
2022	Odela Railway Station	Yes	Yes	
2022	Urvasivo Rakshasivo	Yes	No	
2022	Ginna	Yes	Yes	
2023	Prema Vimanam	Yes	Yes	
2024	OMG: O Manchi Ghost	Yes	Yes	
2024	Utsavam	Yes	Yes	
2024	Fear	Yes	Yes	
2025	Nidurinchu Jahapana	Yes	Yes	
2025	Ari: My Name is Nobody	Yes	Yes	
2026	Seetha Payanam	Yes	Yes	

=== Other language films ===
Year	Title	Credited as		Language	Notes
Year	Title	Songs	Score	Language	Notes
2011	Bbuddha...Hoga Tera Baap	No	Yes	Hindi	
2015	Khushi Khushiyagi	Yes	Yes	Kannada	Remake of Gunde Jaari Gallanthayyinde
2015	Ramleela	Yes	Yes	Kannada	Remake of Loukyam
2016	Uyire Uyire	Yes	Yes	Tamil	Remake of Ishq
2018	Seetharama Kalyana	Yes	Yes	Kannada	
2019	Geetha	Yes	Yes	Kannada	
2020	Expiry Date	Yes	Yes	Hindi	Web series
2022	Tadka	Yes	Yes	Hindi	

=== As singer ===
Year	Title	Song
2004	Jai	"O Manasa O Manasa"
2010	Andari Bandhuvaya	"Malli Malli Rammani (Male)"
2012	Poola Rangadu	"Nuvvu Naku Kavali"
2012	Lovely	"Ninnu Chusina"
2012	Ishq	"Lachhamma"
2013	Gunde Jaari Gallanthayyinde	"Gunde Jaari Gallanthayyinde"
2013	Sukumarudu	"O Baby Naa Lokam"
2013	Chukkalanti Ammayi Chakkanaina Abbayi	"Premante Theeyani"
2013	Bhimavaram Bullodu	"Oka Vaipu Nuvvu"
2014	Khushi Khushiyagi	"Arey Arey"
2015	Temper	"Devudaa"
2015	Akhil	"Hey Akhil"
2016	Uyire Uyire	"Once Upon A Time"
2016	Ism	"Chal Re"
2016	Courier Boy Kalyan	"Vaalu Kalla Pilla"
2016	Ramleela	"Arey Sunny Leone"
2016	Aatadukundam Raa	"Palleku Podam"
2017	Kittu Unnadu Jagratha	"Ardhamaindha"
2017	Nene Raju Nene Mantri	"Devuditho Samaram"
2017	Paisa Vasool	"Kannu Kannu Kalisai"
2019	90ML	"Vellipothunde"
2020	Orey Bujjiga	"Sarigama"
2020	30 Rojullo Preminchadam Ela	"Amma Nannu Mallee Penchavaa"
2022	Bangarraju	"Laddunda"
2022	Shekar	"Love Gante"
2022	Urvasivo Rakshasivo	"Mayare"
2024	OMG: O Manchi Ghost	"Paisa Re Paisa"

=== Music videos ===
Year	Song	Language
2018	Love It Dream It	English
2020	Heal The World	English

== Awards and nominations ==
Award	Year	Category	Work	Result
CineMAA Awards	2015	Best Music Director	Manam	Won
Filmfare Awards South	2014	Best Music Director – Telugu	Gunde Jaari Gallanthayyinde	Nominated
Filmfare Awards South	2015	Best Music Director – Telugu	Manam	Won
Filmfare Awards South	2016	Best Music Director – Telugu	Gopala Gopala	Nominated
Filmfare Awards South	2018	Best Music Director – Telugu	Hello	Nominated
Nandi Awards	2015	Best Music Director	Manam	Won
Santosham Film Awards	2015	Best Music Director	Manam	Won
South Indian International Movie Awards	2014	Best Music Director – Telugu	Gunde Jaari Gallanthayyinde	Nominated
South Indian International Movie Awards	2015	Best Music Director – Telugu	Manam	Won
