= Madhunandan =

Telugu actor

- Born: 1982 (age 43–44)
- Education: MBA
- Alma mater: Osmania University
- Occupation: Actor

Madhunandan is an Indian actor who appears in Telugu films. He began his film career with the 2001 Telugu film, Nuvvu Nenu. He has been in the film industry since he was 19 years old. He did complete his bachelor of commerce from Badruka college of commerce and did a master's degree in business administration from Osmania University, and later relocated to the United States. Nitin confirmed his role in Gunde Jaari Gallanthayyinde, which was his first successful film.

== Filmography ==
Year	Title	Roles	Notes
2001	Nuvvu Nenu		
2003	Ninne Istapaddanu	Charan's friend	
2004	Sye	College student	
2006	Oka `V` Chitram	Microsoft	
2007	Lakshmi Kalyanam		
2007	Takkari	Tirupathi's friend	
2008	Ninna Nedu Repu	Vijay's friend	Simultaneously shot in Tamil
2011	Nenu Naa Rakshasi		
2012	Ishq	Prem	
2013	Gunde Jaari Gallanthayyinde	Madhu	
2014	Kotha Janta		
2014	Geethanjali	Madhunandan	
2014	Chakkiligintha		
2014	Pyar Mein Padipoyane		
2014	Rabhasa	Karthik's friend	
2014	Rowdy Fellow	Bobby	
2014	Close Friends		
2014	Oka Laila Kosam	Praveen	
2015	Pataas	Hijra	
2015	S/o Satyamurthy	Company Manager	
2015	Akhil	Akhil's friend	
2015	Dongaata	Viju	
2015	Shivam	Balkrishna "Balki"	
2016	Garam	Bujji	
2016	Run	Sanjay's brother-in-law	
2016	Speedunnodu	Giri	
2016	Savitri		
2016	A Aa		Guest role
2016	Saptagiri Express	Doctor	
2017	Rarandoi Veduka Chudham	Ravi	
2017	Keshava	Ranga's friend	
2017	LIE	Vennela	
2017	Prematho Mee Karthik	Driver	
2018	Bhaagamathie	CBI Officer	Simultaneously shot in Tamil
2018	Howrah Bridge		
2018	Chal Mohan Ranga	Vilas	
2018	Nela Ticket		
2018	Shailaja Reddy Alludu	Shanthi's fiancée	
2018	Anthaku Minchi		
2018	Taxiwaala	Babai	
2019	Vinaya Vidheya Rama	Ram's 4th brother	
2019	Where Is the Venkatalakshmi	Pandugadu	
2019	Hulchul		
2020	Anukunnadi Okkati Ayyandhi Okati	Shyam	
2020	Tagithe Thandana		
2020	Orey Bujjiga	Srinivas's friend	
2021	Akshara		
2022	Oke Oka Jeevitham		
2022	Nachindi Girl Friendu	Cherry	
2022	Raajahyogam	Resort Manager	
2022	Boyfriend for Hire	Balu	
2023	Katha Venuka Katha		
2023	The Story of A Beautiful Girl		
2023	Nireekshana	Gautham’s friend	
2023	Jorugaa Husharugaa	Anand	
2024	Dear Nanna		
2026	Nari Nari Naduma Murari	Appalraj	
2026	Ranabaali		
2026	Aakasamlo Oka Tara	School Teacher	
