= Drona (2009 film) =

2009 film by J. Karun Kumar

- Promotional poster
- Directed by: J. Karun Kumar
- Written by: J. Karun Kumar
- Produced by: D.S. Rao
- Starring: Nithiin; Priyamani
- Cinematography: S. K. A. Bhupathi
- Edited by: Gautham Raju
- Music by: Anup Rubens
- Distributed by: Sai Krishna Productions
- Release date: 20 February 2009 (India)
- Running time: 148 minutes
- Country: India
- Language: Telugu

Drona is a 2009 Indian Telugu-language action film directed by J. Karun Kumar and produced by D. S. Rao. The film stars Nithiin and Priyamani while Kelly Dorjee, Mukesh Rishi, Seetha, Sunil, and Raghu Babu play supporting roles. The music composed by Anup Rubens. The film was later dubbed into Hindi and Malayalam as Sarfira - The Power Man and Drona, respectively.

== Plot ==
Drona (Nithiin) is the only son of Mukesh Rishi and Meenakshi. Drona’s father is an honest and dedicated Police officer. Drona likes his mother so much and love her as much as his own life. When he was a child Drona steals his father’s revolver to scare his friends. On knowing this his father scolds him, consequently Drona leaves his home and gets lost. After 20 years, he comes back to his parents with the name Chandu. A neighboring girl Indu likes Drona/Chandu a lot. On a fateful day, she finds out that Chandu is none other than the long lost boy, Drona. It's revealed that Drona and his friend were kidnapped along with other boys. They were forced to become thieves. Drona had no other choice to kill a group of police officers in self-defense, while trying to escape with the jewelry because the bad guys have to take poison out of Drona's body and the other guys might get killed by the bad guys. The officers had to shoot Drona. Drona made a bad choice to kill 2 innocent people flying a police helicopter. Drona shouldn't have killed the people, who were flying the helicopter. Drona becomes an approver to send the robbers and their kingpin to jail.

== Cast ==
- Nithiin as Drona
- Priyamani as Indu
- Mukesh Rishi as Dhanraj, Drona's father and Police Officer
- Kelly Dorjee as Sarkar (International Terrorist)
- Seetha as Meenakshi
- Brahmanandam as Viswanath
- Raghu Babu as Kuku
- Sunil as Indu's uncle
- Sivaprasad as Baba
- Babu Antony
- Venu Madhav
- Sudhakar as Doctor
- Vinaya Prasad as Janaki, Indu's mother
- Sivannarayana Naripeddi as Gangadhara Rao, Indu's father
- Uttej
- Sravan as Vikram
- Karate Kalyani
- Kaushal Manda as Pub emcee
- Satya as Pub attendee
- Rakhi Sawant (item number "Sayyare Sayya")

== Production ==
The muhurat shot took place on 10 March 2008.

== Soundtrack ==
The music was composed by Anup Rubens and released by Aditya Music. The audio launch was held on 9 January 2009 at Club Jayabheri in Hyderabad.

Drona

Soundtrack album by Anup Rubens
- Released: 9 January 2009
- Recorded: 2008
- Genre: Soundtrack
- Length: 30:07
- Label: Aditya Music
- Producer: Anup Rubens

Anup Rubens chronology
Naa Styley Veru (2009)	Drona (2009)	Seeta Ramula Kalyanam (2010)

Track list
No.	Title	Lyrics	Singer(s)	Length
1.	"Vaddantana"	Bhaskarabhatla Ravi Kumar	Pranavi Acharya, Rehan Khan	4:25
2.	"Vade Vade"	Ananta Sriram	Shreya Ghoshal	4:16
3.	"Sayyare Sayya" (credited as Kalpana Khan)	Sahithi	Kalpana	4:10
4.	"Em Maya Chesavo"	Ananta Sriram	Ranjith, Harshika	4:33
5.	"Em Maya Chesavo" (Remix)	Ananta Sriram	Ranjith, Harshika	4:13
6.	"Vennela Vaana"	Bhaskarabhatla Ravi Kumar	Udit Narayan, Sowmya	4:11
7.	"Drona" (Sentiment Bit)	Instrumental	Revathi	2:17
8.	"Drona" (Theme Music)	Chaitanya Prasad	Muralidhar, Siddharth, Raghuram	2:02
Total length:				30:07

== Critical reception ==
Movie Rating
Review scores
Source	Rating
Idlebrain	2/5 stars
Rediff.com	2/5 stars

The film opened to mostly negative reviews.

A critic from Rediff.com rated the film two out of five stars and wrote that "Director Karuna Kumar's potboiler seems rather disastrous. Watch it only if you are a fan of Nitin, or if you want to see Priya Mani's bare-dare act". Idlebrain.com's Jeevi in his review gave the film the same rating and stated that "the main drawbacks of the film are incompetent direction and bad villain characterization. When the villain’s character is not etched properly, the heroism does not get elevated. It may find some favor in B and C centers. On a whole, Drona is a badly shot film".

== Awards ==
- Sai Krishna won the Nandi Award for Best Child Actor
