= OMG: O Manchi Ghost =

2024 Indian Telugu-language film by Shankar K. Marthand

- Theatrical release poster
- Directed by: Shankar K. Marthand
- Written by: Shankar K. Marthand
- Produced by: Abinika Inabathuni
- Starring: Vennela Kishore; Nandita Swetha; Shakalaka Shankar; Navami Gayak; Rajath Raghav
- Cinematography: I. Andrew Babu
- Edited by: M. R. Varma
- Music by: Anup Rubens
- Production company: Markset Networks Productions
- Release date: 21 June 2024
- Running time: 119 minutes
- Country: India
- Language: Telugu

OMG: O Manchi Ghost is a 2024 Indian Telugu-language horror comedy film written and directed by Shankar K. Marthand. The film features Vennela Kishore, Nandita Swetha, Shakalaka Shankar, Navami Gayak and Rajath Raghav in important roles.

The film was released on 21 June 2024.

== Cast ==
- Vennela Kishore as Aatma
- Nandita Swetha as Keerthi
- Shakalaka Shankar as Pavuram
- Navami Gayak as Raziya
- Rajath Raghav as Chaitanya
- Naveen Neni as Lakshman
- Nagineedu as MLA Sadasiva Rao
- Raghu Babu
- Prabhakar

== Music ==
The film's music is composed by Anup Rubens.

All music is composed by Anup Rubens.

No.	Title	Lyrics	Singer(s)	Length
1.	"O Papa Nuvvu Thopu"	Mannella Simhachalam, Srinivas Teja	Shakalaka Shankar, Bhada Sooranna	3:12
2.	"Oo Rasika"	Chintala Srinivas	Indravathi Chauhan	3:29
3.	"Paisa Re Paisa"	Anup Rubens, Chintala Srinivas	Anup Rubens	4:03
4.	"OMG Theme"		Indravathi Chauhan	1:07

== Release ==
OMG: O Manchi Ghost was originally scheduled to release on 14 June 2024, but it was released on Aha on 15 August 2024.

== Reception ==
Suhas Sistu of The Hans India rated the film 2.75 out of 5 opining that the film "succeeds in delivering entertainment, primarily driven by the comedic talents of Vennela Kishore and Shakalaka Shankar". Sasidhar Adivi of Times Now gave a rating of 2.5 out of 5 and stated that "the film offers sporadic laughs and scare, making it only engaging in parts".
