= Gunde Jaari Gallanthayyinde =

- Movie poster
- Directed by: Vijay Kumar Konda
- Written by: Harsha Vardhan
- Produced by: N. Nikitha Reddy; Vikram Goud
- Starring: Nithiin; Nithya Menen; Isha Talwar
- Cinematography: I. Andrew
- Edited by: Prawin Pudi
- Music by: Anoop Rubens
- Production company: Shresht Movies
- Release date: 19 April 2013
- Running time: 153 minutes
- Language: Telugu
- Box office: est. ₹22 crore distributors' share

Gunde Jaari Gallanthayyinde (lit. transl. My heart slipped and lost) is a 2013 Indian Telugu-language romantic comedy film directed by debutant Vijay Kumar Konda and written by Harsha Vardhan. Produced by N. Nikitha Reddy under the banner of Shresht Movies, The film stars Nithiin, Nithya Menen, and Isha Talwar. Anup Rubens composed the music while I. Andrew and Prawin Pudi handled the cinematography and editing respectively.

The film's title is inspired by a lyric from the song "Dil Se" from Gabbar Singh (2012). The film was a Blockbuster at the box office, emerging as a consecutive successful film for Nithiin after Ishq (2012), which also starred Nithya Menen. The film was dubbed and released in Hindi and Malayalam as Heart Attack 2 in 2018 and Magic Love respectively. In 2015, it was remade in Kannada as Khushi Khushiyagi.

== Plot ==
Karthik is a software engineer, who believes that one should make decisions independently. At his friend Pandu's wedding reception, Karthik sees Sruthi and develops feelings for her. He asks Pandu's wife to provide intel about Sruthi. After Pandu's wife gives Sruthi's number to Pandu and asks him to convey it to Karthik. A miscommunication occurs between Karthik and Pandu, which leads Karthik to call Sravani. Karthik mistakes Sravani for Sruthi where he converse with her in the cell phone and calls her "Bangaram".

Sravani knows about Karthik and the two become best friends. Meanwhile, Karthik helps his friend Madhu in gaining a girl's attention, who is actually Sruthi. Sruthi falls for Madhu and Karthik learns of the confusion. After learning the confusion, Sravani plans to avenge the deception by Karthik (who harassed Sravani, thinking that he was talking to Sruthi) and gains employment as Karthik's boss and decides to put him through the same hardships.

A chain-of-events leads to Madhu doubting Sruthi and their relationship is at stake, but they unite with Karthik's help. Karthik decides to propose to Sravani and Sravani is ready to reject his proposal to exact her revenge. Karthik reveals to Sravani that he is not a perfect match for her and had realized that he is truly in love with Bangaram (Sravani). After leaving the office, Karthik reaches Sravani's house where he apologize and proposes to her. Sravani reveals her true identity and the couple reunite.

== Cast ==
- Nithiin as Karthik
- Nithya Menen as Sravani / Bangaram
- Isha Talwar as Sruthi
- Ali as Pandu
- Thagubothu Ramesh
- Madhunandan as Madhu
- Raghu Babu
- Ahuti Prasad as Shravani's father
- Sudha as Sravani's mother
- Duvvasi Mohan
- Sandya Janak
- Arun Kumar
- Josh Ravi as Gay man
- Jwala Gutta in a special appearance in the song "Ding Ding Ding"

== Soundtrack ==
Gunde Jaari Gallanthayyinde

Soundtrack album by Anup Rubens
- Released: 27 March 2013
- Recorded: 2013
- Genre: Feature film soundtrack
- Length: 24.22
- Language: Telugu
- Labels: Shreyas Music; Times Music
- Producer: Anup Rubens

Anup Rubens chronology
Sukumarudu (2013)	Gunde Jaari Gallanthayyinde (2013)	Chukkalanti Ammayi Chakkanaina Abbayi (2013)

The soundtrack was composed by Anup Rubens and was released in Hyderabad on 27 March 2013. The soundtrack was distributed by Shreyas Music. Krishna Chaitanya penned four songs for the film. Producer Dil Raju was the chief guest and launched the audio CD. A. Karunakaran, B. V. Nandini Reddy, Surender Reddy, Kona Venkat, Bandla Ganesh, and Jwala Gutta were other guests at the audio launch. "Yemaindho Yemo Ee Vela", a hit song from Pawan Kalyan's Tholi Prema, was remixed in the movie.

Tracklist
No.	Title	Lyrics	Artist(s)	Length
1.	"Gunde Jaari Gallanthayyinde"	Krishna Chaitanya	Anup Rubens, Shravani, Chorus	04:08
2.	"Thu Hi Rey"	Krishna Chaitanya	Nikhil D'Souza, Nithya Menen	04:08
3.	"Ding Ding Ding"	Krishna Chaitanya	Nithiin, Chaitra Ambadipudi, Ranjith, Anup Rubens, Thagubothu Ramesh, Dhanunjay Seepana	04:35
4.	"Neeve Neeve"	Krishna Chaitanya	Adnan Sami	04:17
5.	"Yemaindho Yemo EE Vela"	Bhuvana Chandra	Ramki	04:33
6.	"Gunde Jaari Gallanthayyinde" (Rubens Club Mix)			04:21
Total length:				24.22

== Reception ==
The movie completed 100 days in 18 centres all over Andhra Pradesh and Telangana states.

== Box office ==
The movie was created on a budget of ₹11 crore. It was released in over 450 theatres worldwide, collecting ₹ 25.09 crores and becoming the biggest hit in Nithiin's career.

== Awards ==
Filmfare Awards South

- Best Actress – Telugu - Nithya Menen
