= Lovely (2012 film) =

2012 film by B. Jaya

- Film poster
- Directed by: B. Jaya
- Written by: B. Jaya
- Produced by: R. R. Venkat; B.A. Raju
- Starring: Aadi; Shanvi Srivastava
- Cinematography: S. Arun Kumar
- Edited by: B. Jaya
- Music by: Anup Rubens
- Production companies: R. R. Movie Makers; RJ Cinemas
- Distributed by: R. R. Movie Makers
- Release date: 30 March 2012
- Running time: 139 mins
- Country: India
- Language: Telugu
- Box office: ₹9 crore distributors' share

Lovely is a 2012 Telugu-language romantic comedy film written and directed by B. Jaya. Produced by B. A. Raju and R. R. Venkat, the film stars Aadi and Shanvi Srivastava in her acting debut. The music was composed by Anup Rubens. Along with directing, B. Jaya also handled the editing. The film was released on 30 March 2012 and was a commercial success. It was later dubbed into Hindi as Vijay Meri Hai.

== Plot ==
Akash (Aadi) is a practical and easy going young guy and he does not have a very good opinion about women and love stories. His friend Kittu (Vennela Kishore) is in a Facebook relationship with a girl named Lalli (Chinmayee Ghatrazu). When the time comes to meet each other, Kittu develops cold feet and out of a fear of rejection, sends in Akash to meet Lalli. On the other side, Lalli decides to send her friend Lavanya (Shanvi) to the meeting. It is love at first sight for this ‘new’ couple and very soon, they develop a deep bond. Just when everything seems rosy for the lovebirds, Lavanya's father Mangalampalli Maharadhi (Rajendra Prasad) enters the scene and is not impressed with Akash's behaviour. It is now up to Akash to convince Maharadhi to change his mind.

== Cast ==
- Aadi as Akash
- Shanvi as Lavanya (Lovely)
- Rajendra Prasad as Mangalampalli Maharadhi (Lavanya father's)
- Rahul Dev as David
- Vennela Kishore as Kittu
- Chinmayi Ghatrazu as Lalitha (Lalli)
- Parachuri Gopala Krishna as Lalli's father
- Ahuti Prasad as Bunk Babu Rao
- Harsha Vardhan as Akash's brother
- Satya Krishnan as Akash's sister-in-law
- Anchal Singh as Anjali (Bunk Babu Rao's daughter)
- Tanikella Bharani as School Principal
- Y. Kasi Viswanath in a Special Appearance
- Duvvasi Mohan as Lalli's Father's P.A.
- Prabhakar in a Special Appearance
- Narsing Yadav in a Special Appearance
- Dhanraj in a Special Appearance

== Production ==
It was announced that Aadi, Shanvi, Vennela kishore and other crew members will be in the film. Dr. Rajendra Prasad played an important role in this film.

== Release ==
The film was released on 30 March 2012.

=== Critical reception ===
The "entertainment.oneindia.in" website has stated that "Overall, the film is an okay film with some decent entertainment values".

=== Box office ===
The film has completed 50 days on 18 May 2012 in 34 centres. The film has completed 100 days run on 7 July 2012 in 12 centres.

== Soundtrack ==
Lovely

Soundtrack album by Anup Rubens
- Released: 13 March 2012
- Recorded: 2012
- Genre: Feature film soundtrack
- Length: 25:10
- Label: Aditya Music
- Producer: Anup Rubens

Anup Rubens chronology
Ishq (2012)	Lovely (2012)	Housefull (2012)

The audio of the film was released on 13 March 2012 through Aditya Music label in the market. The launch of the audio was held at Prasad Labs in Hyderabad on same day. The soundtrack of the film was composed by Anoop Rubens and its consists of seven songs. The lyrics for three songs were written by Anantha Sreeram and another three songs were written by Ramajogayya Sastry, Kandikonda, Sirasri and one song was written by the music director of film Anoop Rubens.

Track list
No.	Title	Lyrics	Singer(s)	Length
1.	"Dolare Dolare"	Ramajogayya Sastry	Benny Dayal, Bhargavi, Noel	4:39
2.	"Chori Choriye"	Anantha Sriram	Vijay Prakash, Anjana Sowmya	4:20
3.	"Ninnu Chusina"	Anantha Sriram	Anoop Rubens, Aishwarya	4:24
4.	"I Dont Know"	Anoop Rubens	Chaitra	2:15
5.	"Lovely Lovely"	Kandikonda	Ranjith, Saindhavi	4:00
6.	"Nenunnadi"	Anantha Sriram	Anoop Rubens, Dhanunjay	1:24
7.	"Evo Evevo"	Sirasri	Chaitra, Anoop Rubens	4:08
Total length:				25:10
