= Lie (film) =

2017 action film by Hanu Raghavapudi

- Theatrical poster
- Directed by: Hanu Raghavapudi
- Written by: Hanu Raghavapudi; Jakka Hariprasad
- Produced by: Ram Achanta; Gopichand Achanta; Anil Sunkara
- Starring: Nithiin; Arjun; Megha Akash
- Cinematography: J. Yuvaraj
- Edited by: M. S. Rajashekhar Reddy (S. R. Shekhar)
- Music by: Mani Sharma
- Production company: 14 Reels Entertainment
- Release date: 11 August 2017
- Running time: 141 minutes
- Country: India
- Language: Telugu
- Budget: ₹32 crore (US$3.3 million)
- Box office: ₹17 crore (US$1.8 million)

LIE: Love Intelligence Enmity is a 2017 Indian Telugu-language action thriller film written & directed by Hanu Raghavapudi and produced by 14 Reels Entertainment. The film stars Nithiin, Arjun Sarja and Megha Akash, while Sriram and Ravi Kishan play supporting roles. The music was composed by Mani Sharma with cinematography by J. Yuvaraj and editing by M. S. Rajashekhar Reddy. The film released on 11 August 2017 to mixed reviews from the critics, with praise for the cast performances (especially Arjun's), story, cinematography, background score, action sequences, editing, and production values but criticism for the screenplay, direction, love track between the main leads, and climax.

== Plot ==
Sathyam (Nithiin) is a good-for-nothing son of a widowed mother (Poornima). He is unemployed and lives off of his late father's (Suresh) monthly pension. He is unmarried and fantasizes about marrying an American girl. By a quirk of fate, Sathyam, along with a stranger named Chaitra (Megha Akash), who has a dream to win a lot of money, end up in Las Vegas, where they decide to only lie with one another. Shortly after, they start to fall in love with one another through their beautiful lies.

At the National Investigation Agency (NIA), a frustrated officer named Bharadwaj (Ravi Kishan) is desperate to nab an elusive criminal named Padmanabham (Arjun Sarja), who has escaped the long arm of the law for 19 years. Padmanabham is a famous Indian ropewalker and magician, but he is also a master of disguise. Thus, the NIA has no idea what he looks like. He is now suspected to be residing in the USA. Bharadwaj has drafted a sharp officer named Aadi (Sriram) to discover Padmanabham's hideout and identity by following a suit which he has purchased and is assumed to have an obsession with. The operation of this mission is called Sholay, implying that Aadi is the showman.

All along, Padmanabham tries to go after the team, which is trying to trace him, only to end up with Sathyam, who was a part of this operation the whole time and the actual showman. Then the cat and mouse game ensures between Padmanabham and Sathyam who lost their most trusted members in the battle including Aadi, and Viswanatham (Nassar) Padmanabham's right-hand man in order to protect Padmanabham's identity.

However, Sathyam manages to theft the suit of Padmanabham, and then he gets to know that the suit had implanted with unidentified fingerprints. Then he hides it in secret. Later, Padmanabham turns up under disguise as Bharadwaj reveals it to Satyam that the fingerprints belong to the Indian Army Chief Subratho Roy. Then Padmanabham's plans reveal that he wants to theft the Indian Army weaponry by using his fingerprints. Roy Being a Hand Painting Artist, unknown of the identity he gifted his latest hand painting to Padmanabham, and he takes this as an opportunity sets up a fake theft of his painting and sends it to Steve an expert in collect or arranging the fingerprints in an order at Vegas. Then, he successfully transferred it into the suit.

Then, believing he is Bharadwaj, he reveals the whereabouts of the suit. Then Padmanabham recovered the suit and abducts Bharadwaj. Then Sathyam reveals to Padmanabham that the suit is not what he thought off. Then Satyam's past reveals, when Padmanabham is going to leave India. He was disguised as a female bartender to escape from cops used as Satyam's father as his aggressor and escapes with a short edge, Bharadwaj shot him to death on thinking as he is his Criminal later finds out he is an innocent. Then Sathyam announce that he will kill both of them for his father's death. Then Sathyam makes a deal with Padmanabham that the suit against Bharadwaj's life, Then in the final battle Sathyam recognized him as road trick magician Padmanabham and fights him successfully kills him. Then Bharadwaj tries to apologize him, but Sathyam tells it's a lie. He never had any intention to kill him.

Finally, film ends with a happy note by Sathyam and Chaitra getting married.

== Cast ==
- Nithin as A. Sathyam IPS, Central Intelligence, who works under loop.
- Arjun as Padmanabham, a rope trick magician and a master of disguise in crime.
- Megha Akash as Chaitra, Sathyam's love interest (Voice by RJ Swetha)
  - Hasini Anvi as Young Chaitra
- Sriram as Aadi IPS undercover Central Intelligence officer
- Ravi Kishan as Commissioner Bharadwaj IPS
- Nassar as Viswanadham, trusted right hand men to Padmanabham.
- Ajay as Ajay, Padmanabham's henchman
- Suresh as Sathyam's father
- Poornima as Sathyam's mother
- Prudhvi Raj as Indrudu
- Brahmaji as Narada
- Rajiv Kanakala as Chaitra's father
- Pramodini Pammi as Chaitra's mother
- Surya as Srihari
- Madhunandan as Vennela, Sathyam's friend
- Chandini Chowdary as Sathyam's proposed bride (Cameo Appearance)
- Jahnavi Dasetty as Chaitra's friend
- Venu Yeldandi as Thief
- Ashish Gandhi as Cop
- Kadambari Kiran as Travel Agent
- Appaji Ambarisha Darbha as Army Chief Subratho Roy (Voice-over by Hemachandra)
- Ambati Srinivas

== Soundtrack ==
The music was composed by Mani Sharma, in his fifth collaboration with Nithiin after Sri Anjaneyam (2004), Hero (2008), Rechipo (2009), and Maaro (2011). The audio rights were acquired by Aditya Music.

Lie

Soundtrack album by Mani Sharma
- Released: June 12, 2017
- Recorded: 2017
- Genre: Soundtrack
- Length: 16:38
- Label: Aditya Music
- Producer: Mani Sharma

Mani Sharma chronology
Aaradugula Bullet (2017)	Lie (2017)	Balakrishnudu (2017)

Track list
No.	Title	Lyrics	Singer(s)	Length
1.	"Bombhaat"	Kasarla Shyam	Rahul Sipligunj, Ramya Behara	4:02
2.	"Miss Sunshine"	Krishna Kanth	Anurag Kulkarni, Sinduri	3:56
3.	"Laggam Time"	Krishna Kanth	Saicharan, Sahiti Chaganti	4:52
4.	"Freedom"	Krishna Kanth	Anurag Kulkarni, Ramya Behara	3:48
Total length:				16:38

== Reception ==
=== Critical response ===
Priyanka Sundar from The Indian Express wrote "Such technical brilliance, especially the beautiful shots in Las Vegas is lost in the confusion that has taken shape on screen". A reviewer of Samayam says "Mani Sharma's background score is a plus for the movie. All in all, Hanu Raghavapudi has impressed with his take as a director. Audiences who like stylish action intellectual thriller mind game movies will definitely like 'Lie'." Srivathsan Nadadhur from The Hindu wrote "A simple story with a complex narrative, Lie is a director’s show. Hanu Raghavapudi proves he’s here to stay for long."

Other critics expressed mixed feelings. Critic Sowmya Sruth of The Times of India gave the film a 3 out of 5 stars saying, "The climax will take you by surprise, but the Hanu Raghavapudi directorial will disappoint you in some bits." One critic from Sify Movies called the movie "a mixed bag", and said the romance held back the film.
