= Nagineedu =

Indian (Telugu) actor

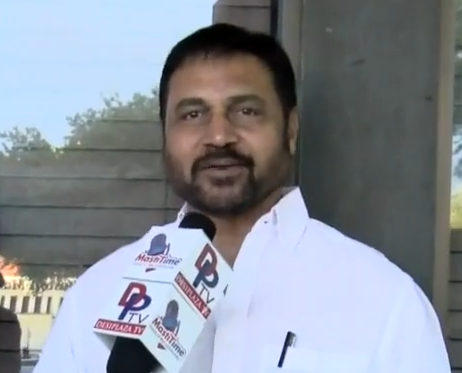
- Nagineedu in 2018
- Born: Vellanki Nagineedu; 7 January 1949 (age 77); Andhra Pradesh, India
- Occupation: Actor
- Years active: 2002–present

Vellanki Nagineedu (born 7 January 1949) is an Indian actor who primarily works in Telugu and Tamil films. He was a general manager at Prasad Labs before S. S. Rajamouli offered him a role in Maryada Ramanna. He won Nandi Award for Best Villain for his role in the film.

== Filmography ==
=== Telugu films ===
Year	Title	Role	Ref.
2002	Chennakeshava Reddy	Minister	
2003	Simhachalam	Police Commissioner	
2006	Indian Beauty	Vishal's father	
2007	Lakshmi Kalyanam	District Collector	
2010	Maryada Ramanna	Ramineedu	
2010	Vedam	Jihadi leader	
2011	Jai Bolo Telangana		
2011	Aha Naa Pellanta	Jagarlamudi Janaki Ramaiah / JJ	
2011	Nenu Naa Rakshasi		
2011	Brahmi Gadi Katha	Rowdy	
2011	Virodhi		
2011	Sri Rama Rajyam		
2011	Pilla Zamindar	Rudra Ramaraju	
2011	Seema Tapakai	Nagineedu	
2012	Srimannarayana	Dr. Sreekar Prasad	
2012	Endukante... Premanta!	Pulla Reddy	
2012	Gabbar Singh	Naidu	
2012	Ishq	Priya's father	
2013	Kaalicharan	Kaalicharan's father	
2013	Bhai	Raghavaiah	
2013	Doosukeltha	Chinna's grandfather	
2013	Ramayya Vasthavayya	Raja Rao Bahadur Ramachandra Naidu	
2013	Venkatadri Express	Ram Murthy	
2013	Greeku Veerudu		
2013	Mirchi	Uma's older brother	
2013	Adda	Patel	
2013	Shadow	Police Commissioner Thyagi	
2014	Yuddham		
2014	Aa Aiduguru	Ex-Chief Minister	
2014	Rabhasa	Gangi Reddy	
2014	Brother of Bommali	Surya Pratap	
2014	Saheba Subramanyam		
2015	Bengal Tiger	Jaya Narayan	
2015	Columbus	Neeraja's father	
2015	Shivam	Krishna Murthy	
2015	Ori Devudoy	Dasakanta	
2015	Dynamite	S.I. Swaminath	
2015	Ram Leela	Sasya's father	
2016	Sahasam Swasaga Sagipo	Sathyamoorthy	
2016	Siddhartha	Surya's father	
2016	Selfie Raja	Police commissioner	
2016	Shourya	Netra's father	
2017	Oye Ninne	Sekharam	
2017	C/o Surya	Krishnamurthy	
2017	Spyder	Police Commissioner Gajapathi	
2017	Oxygen	Sripathi	
2017	Gulf	Rajaiah	
2018	1st Rank Raju	Educational Minister	
2018	Savyasachi	Arun's father	
2018	Raju Gadu	Suryanarayana	
2018	Aatagallu	CM Bapineedu	
2018	Bhaagamathie	CBI Officer	
2019	Ruler	Seetaramaiah	
2019	Venky Mama	Gagani	
2019	Arjun Suravaram	Arjun's father	
2019	Yatra	Telapalli Raghavayya	
2019	RDX Love	Chief Minister	
2021	Vakeel Saab	ACP B. Ravinder	
2022	Induvadana		
2022	Ori Devuda	Durgaraju	
2023	Suvarna Sundari	Sage	
2023	Rules Ranjann		
2024	Raju Gari Ammayi Naidu Gari Abbayi		
2024	OMG: O Manchi Ghost	Sadasiva Rao	
2024	Satyabhama	Narayana Das	

=== Tamil films ===
Year	Title	Role
2007	Pallikoodam	Kokila's uncle
2012	Ammavin Kaipesi	Chittibabu
2013	6	Nallama Reddy
2014	Vallavanukku Pullum Aayudham	Singaraayar
2015	Vedalam	Doctor
2015	Thani Oruvan	Ashok Pandian
2015	Kaaki Sattai	Singaperumal
2016	Maaveeran Kittu	Upper caste's leader
2016	Achcham Enbadhu Madamaiyada	Sathyamoorthy
2016	Oru Naal Koothu	Lakshmi's father
2016	Oyee	Krish's father
2017	Balloon	Community leader
2017	Velaikkaran	Loknath
2017	Spyder	Police Commissioner Gajapathi
2017	Neruppu Da	Fire Zonal Officer
2018	Marainthirunthu Paarkum Marmam Enna	
2018	Bhaagamathie	CBI Officer
2019	Kaappaan	Sikander
2019	Raatchasi	Geetha Rani's father
2020	Asuraguru	Jamaludheen
2022	Kaari	
2023	Run Baby Run	Priyanka’s father

=== Other language films ===
Year	Title	Role	Language
2013	Ivan Maryadaraman	Narasimhan	Malayalam
2018	Seizer		Kannada
2025	Fateh	Ramana Reddy	Hindi

=== Television ===
Year	Title	Role	Language	Network	Ref.
2020	Chadarangam	Erra Rama Krishna Rao	Telugu	ZEE5	
2022	Paper Rocket	Gunaselan	Tamil	ZEE5	
2023	Chiranjeevi Lakshmi Sowbhagyavathi	Achyutharamaiah	Telugu	Zee Telugu	
