= Shanvi Srivastava =

Indian actress (born 1993)

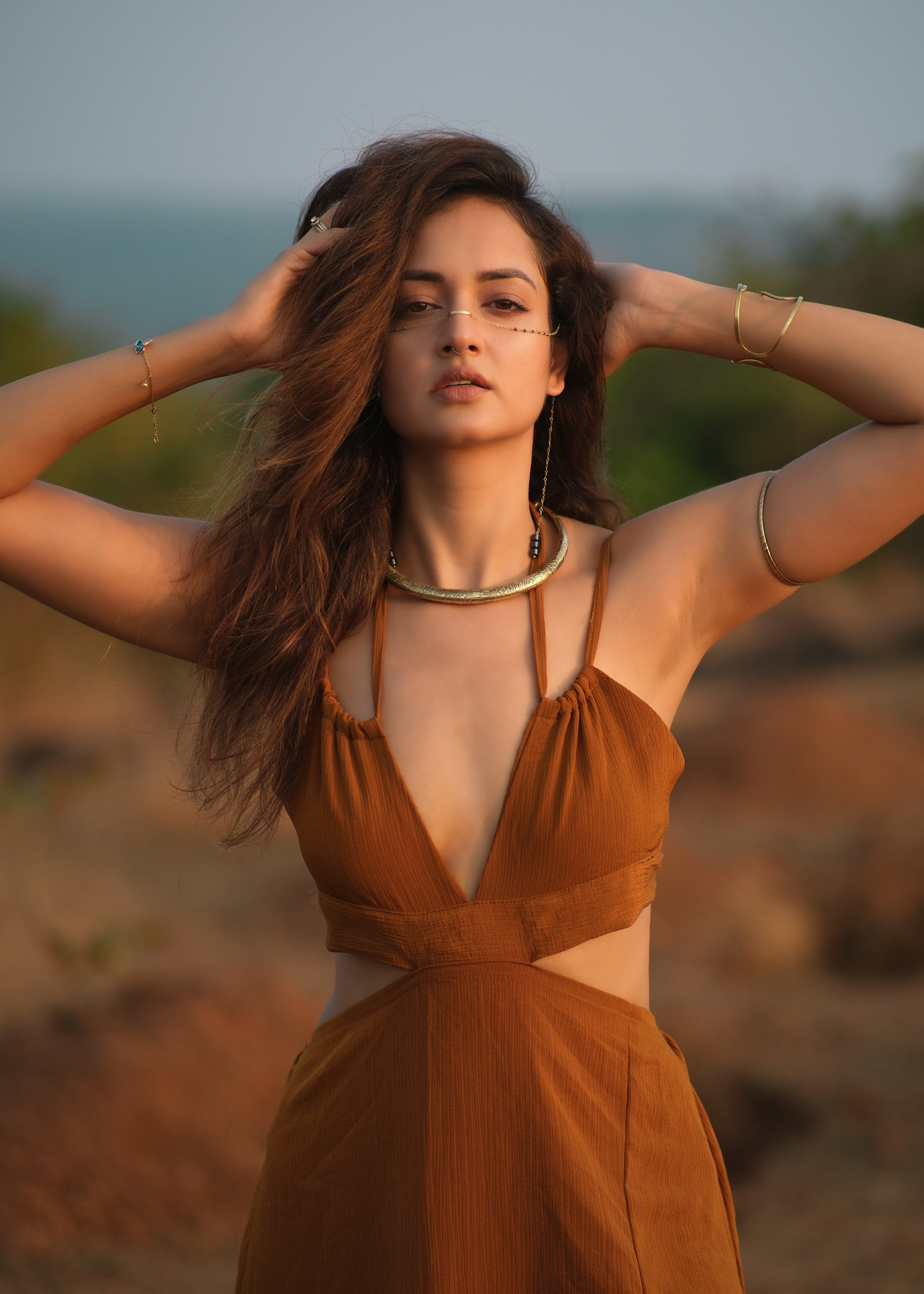
- Srivastava in 2023
- Born: 8 December 1993 (age 32); Varanasi, Uttar Pradesh, India
- Occupation: Actress
- Years active: 2012–present
- Relatives: Vidisha Srivastava (sister)

Shanvi Srivastava (born 8 December 1993) is an Indian actress who primarily works in Kannada and Telugu films. Srivastava is the first Kannada actress to have won both the SIIMA Critics Award for Best Actress – Kannada for Masterpiece and the SIIMA Award for Best Actress – Kannada for Tarak. She has appeared in successful films such as Masterpiece (2015), Sundaranga Jaana (2016), Tarak (2017), Mufti (2017), and Avane Srimannarayana (2019).

== Early life ==
Srivastava was born on 8 December 1993, in Varanasi. She completed her schooling at Children College Azamgarh, Uttar Pradesh and graduation at the Thakur College of Science and Commerce in Mumbai and completed her B.Com degree in 2016. Srivastava has one elder brother and one elder sister, actress Vidisha Srivastava.

== Career ==
Srivastava made her acting debut in 2012 in B. Jaya's Lovely while she was still studying. In her second Telugu film Adda, she played a fashion designing student. Sushil Rao of The Times of India wrote, "In the lengthy role that she has, Shanvi gets all her expressions right". Shanvi was then signed by Ram Gopal Varma to play a brief role as Vishnu Manchu's romantic interest in his Telugu political drama Rowdy.

In 2014, Srivastava made her Kannada debut with the horror comedy film Chandralekha, and received positive reviews for her performance. In 2015, Shanvi played a carefree girl in Masterpiece opposite Yash. The film was a box office success. Sharadhaa of The New Indian Express praised her "glam factor" in the film.

In 2017, Srivastava played a cancer patient in Tarak opposite Darshan. Sunayana Suresh noted that Shanvi leaves a "fine impression". In the same year, she also played the lead alongside Shiva Rajkumar and Sriimurali in Mufti, which was a major commercial success.

Srivastava made her international debut in the Chinese drama series 夜天子 (Ye Tian Zi, The Dark Lord) in 2018, making the selection over the initial choice of Sunny Leone. She learnt Mandarin for the role.

In 2019, Srivastava had two releases, Avane Srimannarayana and Geetha, which became the first Kannada film where she dubbed for herself. In Avane Srimannarayana, she appeared as a reporter opposite Rakshit Shetty. It became one of the highest grossing Kannada film of all time. Aravind Shwetha of The News Minute noted, "Shanvi as a journalist gets to play a de-glam role and adds different shades to ASN. We get to a see different version of the actor in her and she plays to her advantage."

In 2022, Srivastava made her Malayalam film debut with Mahaveeryar alongside Nivin Pauly and Asif Ali. In 2023, she played a gangster in Baang. Y Maheswara Reddy stated, "Shanvi stands out for her portrayal in the action scenes and delivers a strong performance." In 2024, Srivastava made her Marathi film debut, with Raanti opposite Sharad Kelkar.

== Media image ==
Srivastava was named the Bangalore Times Most Desirable Women in 2019. In the same list, she was placed 7th in 2017, 6th in 2018, and 3rd in 2020. She is also one of the most followed Kannada actress on Instagram.

== Filmography ==
=== Films ===
Key
| † | Denotes films that have not yet been released |

| Year | Title | Role | Language | Notes | Ref. |
|---|---|---|---|---|---|
| 2012 | Lovely | Lavanya "Lovely" | Telugu | | |
| 2013 | Adda | Priya | Telugu | | |
| 2014 | Chandralekha | Aishwarya "Aishu" | Kannada | | |
| 2014 | Rowdy | Sirisha | Telugu | | |
| 2014 | Pyar Mein Padipoyane | Yukta | Telugu | | |
| 2015 | Masterpiece | Nisha | Kannada | | |
| 2016 | Bhale Jodi | Nithya | Kannada | | |
| 2016 | Sundaranga Jaana | Nandana "Nandu" Rao | Kannada | | |
| 2017 | Saheba | Nandini | Kannada | | |
| 2017 | Tarak | Meera | Kannada | | |
| 2017 | Mufti | Raksha | Kannada | | |
| 2018 | The Villain | Herself | Kannada | Special appearance in song "Bolo Bolo Ramappa" | |
| 2019 | Geetha | Priya / Young Aarthi | Kannada | | |
| 2019 | Avane Srimannarayana | Lakshmi | Kannada | | |
| 2022 | Kasthuri Mahal | Kasthuri | Kannada | | |
| 2022 | Mahaveeryar | Devayani | Malayalam | | |
| 2023 | Baang | Leona | Kannada | | |
| 2024 | Raanti | | Marathi | | |
| 2026 | America America 2 | Nudi | Kannada | | |
| 2027 | Thrishulam † | TBA | Kannada | Post-production | |

== Awards and nominations ==
| Year | Film | Award | Category | Result | Ref. |
|---|---|---|---|---|---|
| 2016 | South Indian International Movie Awards | Best Actress Critics – Kannada | Masterpiece | Won | |
| 2016 | Filmfare Awards South | Best Actress – Kannada | Masterpiece | Nominated | |
| 2018 | Filmfare Awards South | Best Actress – Kannada | Tarak | Nominated | |
| 2018 | South Indian International Movie Awards | Best Actress – Kannada | Tarak | Won | |
| 2021 | South Indian International Movie Awards | Best Actress – Kannada | Avane Srimannarayana | Nominated | |
| 2024 | Chittara Star Awards | Star Icon – Female | —N/a | Won | |
