= Sri Anjaneyam =

- Poster
- Directed by: Krishna Vamsi
- Written by: Krishna Vamsi
- Produced by: Krishna Vamsi
- Starring: Arjun; Nithiin; Charmy Kaur
- Cinematography: C. Ramprasad
- Edited by: K. V. Krishna Reddy
- Music by: Mani Sharma
- Release date: 24 July 2004
- Running time: 174 minutes
- Country: India
- Language: Telugu
- Budget: ₹10 crore

Sri Anjaneyam (Note: According to the director Krishna Vamsi, "Sri Anjaneyam is the first line of a stanza (dandakam) used for praising Lord Anjaneya".) is a 2004 Indian Telugu-language fantasy action film written, directed, and produced by Krishna Vamsi. It stars Arjun Sarja, Nithiin and Charmme Kaur. Prakash Raj, Ramya Krishna, Pilla Prasad, Chandra Mohan, and L. B. Sriram play supporting roles. The music was composed by Mani Sharma.

The film was released on 24 July 2004 and was commercially unsuccessful. It was dubbed and released in Tamil as Hanumaan and in Hindi as My Boss Bajarangbali. It was remade in Odia as Chhati Chiri Dele Tu (2008).

== Plot ==
Anji's parents are devotees of Lord Hanuman. Anji's father, an engineer, dreams of developing his village by building a dam to irrigate the surrounding areas. However, Anji's Father dies with multiple stabs and his wife throat has been slit and are murdered by the cruel village head Brahmam and his henchmen. Anji now becomes an orphan, and the head priest of the village's Lord Rama temple raises him as his own son. Anji becomes a great devotee of Lord Hanuman and starts working as an assistant to the head priest. He gradually becomes everyone's favorite and is loved by everyone in the village. Paddu also develops a love for Anji over time and starts following him constantly. Now, once again, the village head, with the support of a black magician, plans to kill Anji to gain supernatural powers.

Lord Hanuman comes to the temple in disguise as a human and introduces himself as "Anji" to Anji (Anjaneya). Anji (Anjaneya) allows Anji (Hanuman) to stay with him, and both become good friends in the process. Anji (Hanuman) secures Anji (Anjaneya) from the evil attacks every time and makes Anji perform the final rites of his dead parents. However, some villagers see this and get frightened, assuming Anji (Anjaneya) is performing black magic. Many instances like this lead the villagers to believe that Anji has unseen powers. Anji finally kills the black magician, who attempts to kill Anji on behalf of the village head. When Anji learns of this, he misunderstands the situation and tells Anji (Hanuman) to go away. Anji (Hanuman) tries to explain, but Anji (Anjaneya), in rage, tells the former to leave him.

Later, the village head, with the support and testimonies of some villagers of the instances in which Anji did unreal things, holds Anji responsible for the death of the black magician and tries to kill him, claiming that he is performing black magic. But this is stopped by the head priest, who pleads with the village head not to kill Anji and asks him to expel him from the village as a punishment. Anji gets expelled from the village, but he does not care and comes back. The villagers stop him, but some of them start bowing down to him for the support he got from Lord Hanuman. Anji, unable to get their point, questions them and realizes that the Anji who has been with him all these days was not visible to any other villager except him. He even tells many instances in which Anji performed unreal things with him. But all the villagers say that they have not seen anyone named Anji besides Anji all these days.

Later, Anji realizes through the head priest that the person named Anji who has been with him all the time was none other than Lord Hanuman. Anji ultimately gets shocked and realizes his mistake. He hits his head with a brick in front of Lord Hanuman's statue out of remorse and falls unconscious. He witnesses Lord Hanuman instructing him to build the dam and name it Seethamma Thalli Dam. Anji starts doing so, but the village head once again tries to kill him. This time, Lord Hanuman helps Anji and beats up the villains. Finally, Anji, with the help of the villagers, completes the dam, thereby fulfilling his parents' dream of constructing it.

== Cast ==
- Nithiin as Anji
- Charmme Kaur as Padmini "Paddu", Anji's love interest
- Arjun as "Anji" (Lord Hanuman in human form)
- Prakash Raj as Anji's father
- Ramya Krishnan as Anji's mother
- Pilla Prasad as Brahmam
- Brahmanandam as Seenu
- Chandra Mohan as Temple Priest
- Giri Babu as Rama Chandra Murthy
- L. B. Sriram as Paddu's father
- Prudhvi Raj as Black Magician
- Subbaraju as Thadu Gang Leader
- Gautam Raju as Constable
- Ananth Babu as Lawyer Annayya
- Allari Subhashini
- Giridhar
- Vimalasri
- Tarzan Laxminarayana
- Jogi Krishnam Raju
- Jogi Naidu
- Lavanya

== Soundtrack ==
The music was composed by Mani Sharma. Music was released on Maruthi Music Company. In a music review of the film, Sreya Sunil wrote that "Overall, Mani Sharma as extremely catchy tunes in this album".

No.	Title	Lyrics	Singer(s)	Length
1.	"Ooregi Ravayya"	Veturi	Shankar Mahadevan	5:48
2.	"Rama Rama"	Sirivennela Seetharama Sastry	Mallikarjun	5:17
3.	"Avvai Tuvvai"	Sirivennela Seetharama Sastry	Tippu, Shreya Ghoshal	4:09
4.	"Poola Ghuma"	Sirivennela Seetharama Sastry	Shreya Ghoshal	5:04
5.	"Slokam"	Traditional	K. S. Chithra, Kalpana	2:37
6.	"Thika Maka"	Sirivennela Seetharama Sastry	S. P. Balasubrahmanyam	4:50
7.	"Ee Yogam"	Sirivennela Seetharama Sastry	S. P. Balasubrahmanyam	3:14
Total length:				31:00

== Reception ==
Jeevi of Idlebrain.com opined that "The film picks up the momentum from the scene where Arjun descends on to the earth. And the movie is entertaining and educating as long as Arjun is there in the film with him making Nitin do miracles and also the philosophical conversation with Nitin". A critic from Indiaglitz said that "Vamsi's main problem, as a director, is that he has tried to cram too many things in too small a canvas. The result is he is successful only in a few things". Mithun Verma of Full Hyderabad stated that "In short, only the Gods can rescue this movie. But there's not enough reason for them, too".
