= Nithiin =

Indian actor (born 1983)

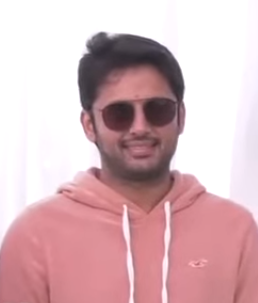
- Nithiin in 2020
- Born: Nithin Kumar Reddy; 30 March 1983 (age 43); Nizamabad, Andhra Pradesh, India (now in Telangana, India)
- Education: Shadan College of Engineering and Technology
- Occupations: Actor; film producer; film distributor
- Years active: 2002–present
- Spouse: Shalini Kandukuri (m. 2020)
- Children: 1

Nalla Nithin Kumar Reddy (born 30 March 1983), known professionally as Nithiin, is an Indian film actor and producer who works in Telugu cinema. He is a recipient of several accolades including a Filmfare Award.

Nithiin made his acting debut with Jayam (2002), a commercial success, which earned him the Filmfare Award for Best Male Debut – South. Nithiin then starred in Dil (2003), Sye (2004) and Sri Anjaneyam (2004), all of which were commercially successful. After a series of box-office failures, he achieved success with the romance films Ishq (2012) and Gunde Jaari Gallanthayyinde (2013), receiving Filmfare Award for Best Actor – Telugu nominations for both these performances. Nithiin went onto further establish himself with notable films such as Heart Attack (2014), Chinnadana Nee Kosam (2014), A Aa (2016), Bheeshma (2020), and Maestro (2021). This was followed by a career downturn and several poorly received films.

Nithiin established his own film production studio, Shresht Movies in 2013. Nithiin is a brand ambassador for the Swachh Bharat campaign for the state of Telangana.

== Early life ==
Nithin was born to film distributor N. Sudhakar Reddy and Laxmi Reddy. He has an elder sister named Nikitha Reddy. He completed his education at Geetanjali School, Begumpet and did his intermediate education from Ratna Junior College and pursued his graduation at Shadan College of Engineering and Technology, Gandipet. His father later turned a producer and produced two movies with him, Gunde Jaari Gallanthayyinde and Chinnadana Nee Kosam. Nithin has added at extra "i" in his name and spells it as Nithiin.

== Career ==
=== Debut and early success (2002-2004) ===
Nithiin started his career with Jayam in 2002, directed by Teja. Teja saw him at Sudarshan 35 mm theatre at a screening of his Nuvvu Nenu, on two occasions. He then enquired him about his acting interest and did a screen test and photo session, after which, he selected him as the lead for Jayam, which also starred Sadha and Gopichand. Following the blockbuster success of his debut, he then acted in the action comedy, Dil, directed by V. V. Vinayak and produced by Dil Raju, in his production debut. Like Jayam, it went to become a big blockbuster, becoming the third-highest grossing Telugu film of the year, after Simhadri and Okkadu. Later in the same year, he acted in Sambaram, directed by K. Dasaradh, written and produced by Teja. In 2004, Nithiin starred in Sri Anjaneyam, directed by Krishna Vamsi, where he played the role as a devotee of Lord Hanuman. This was also the first film where Nithiin dubbed for his dialogues, who until then was voiced by Sivaji.

=== Consecutive failures (2005-2011) ===
Following his 2004 film Sye, directed by S. S. Rajamouli, Nithin appeared in a number of films, some of which are Dhairyam, Agyaat (his only Hindi film till date, which was directed by Ram Gopal Varma, was simultaneously dubbed in Telugu as Adavi) and Seeta Ramula Kalyanam. However, none of these films were commercially successful. Nithiin also has the distinction of most consecutive flops (12) by any actor in Telugu cinema. He tasted success after many years with 2012 Vikram Kumar-directed romantic drama film Ishq.

=== Comeback and stardom (2012-2016) ===
In Ishq, Nithiin paired opposite Nithya Menen, which was also co-produced by his father Sudhakar Reddy. He acted in the film Gunde Jaari Gallanthayyinde in 2013. Isha Talwar and Nithya Menen played the lead roles along with Nithiin. Later, he acted in Chinnadana Nee Kosam, a film written and directed by A. Karunakaran in 2014, also produced by N. Sudhakar Reddy and sister Nikhita Reddy under their home banner Sreshth Movies. Later the year, he played the lead in Heart Attack, directed by Puri Jagannadh. He made the role of a hippie and the movie got a mixed reviews. He acted in the role of a courier boy in the movie Courier Boy Kalyan, released in 2015, directed by Premsai and produced by Gautham Vasudev Menon. Nithiin acted in the film A Aa (2016), written and directed by Trivikram Srinivas, opposite Samantha Ruth Prabhu and Anupama Parameswaran. The film became the biggest grosser in Nithin's career.

=== Career expansion and fluctuations (2017−present) ===
In 2017, Nithiin acted in the film LIE which was directed by Hanu Raghavapudi. It garnered average reviews from critics and could not perform well at the box office. In 2018, Nithiin's Chal Mohan Ranga directed by Krishna Chaitanya with co-star Megha Akash. The film performed poorly at the box office. Later the year, he starred in Srinivasa Kalyanam opposite Raashi Khanna and directed by Satish Vegesna. His 2020 film Bheeshma, directed by Venky Kudumula and starring alongside Rashmika Mandanna was a commercial success.

Nithiin collaborated with director Chandra Sekhar Yeleti for Check (2021), co-starring Rakul Preet Singh and Priya Prakash Varrier. His second release of the year was Rang De, directed by Venky Atluri and starred alongside Keerthy Suresh. His third release of the year was the black comedy crime thriller Maestro which had a direct-to-streaming release on Disney+ Hotstar on 17 September 2021. He played the role of a pianist, with critics praising his performance in the film. In September 2021, he started filming was for his next film Macherla Niyojakavargam. It was released in August 2022 to negative reviews, and surfaced as a box-office bomb. In 2023, Nithiin starred in Extra Ordinary Man. Both his 2025 films, Robinhood, and Thammudu, became box office failures. His next film Alias Rukmini presented by Nani (actor) is scheduled to release on 4 December 2026.

== Personal life ==
In 2020, Nithiin married his girlfriend Shalini Kandukuri. Their wedding took place at Falaknuma Palace, Hyderabad.

== Other work and media image ==
For Gunde Jaari Gallanthayinde, Nithiin was placed 4th in Rediff.com's "Top Telugu Actors" list. In the Hyderabad Times Most Desirable Men list, Nithiin 16th in 2017, 23rd in 2019 and 25th in 2020. In 2015, he became an ambassador of the Swachh Bharat campaign for the state of Telangana. During the COVID-19 pandemic, Nithiin donated ₹10 lakhs to the CM relief funds of Andhra Pradesh and Telangana. Nithiin is a celebrity endorser for brands and products and such as Fair & Lovely and Sneha Chicken.

== Filmography ==
=== As actor ===
Key
†	Denotes films that have not yet been released

- All films are in Telugu, unless otherwise noted.

Year	Title	Role	Notes	Ref.
2002	Jayam	Venkat		
2003	Dil	Seenu		
2003	Sambaram	Ravi		
2004	Sri Anjaneyam	Anji		
2004	Sye	Pruthvi		
2005	Dhairyam	Seenu		
2005	Allari Bullodu	Raju "Balu" / Munna	Dual role	
2006	Raam	Raam		
2007	Takkari	Tirupathi		
2008	Aatadista	Jagan / Chinna		
2008	Victory	Vijay Chandra		
2008	Hero	Radhakrishna		
2009	Drona	Drona		
2009	Agyaat	Sujal	Hindi film	
2009	Rechipo	Siva		
2010	Seeta Ramula Kalyanam Lankalo	Chandrasekhar "Chandu" Reddy		
2011	Maaro	Sathyanarayana Murthy / Siva / Sundaram		
2012	Ishq	Rahul		
2013	Gunde Jaari Gallanthayyinde	Karthik		
2014	Heart Attack	Varun		
2014	Chinnadana Nee Kosam	Nithin		
2015	Courier Boy Kalyan	Kalyan		
2016	A Aa	Anand Vihari "Nandu"		
2017	LIE	A. Sathyam		
2018	Chal Mohan Ranga	Mohan Ranga	25th Film	
2018	Srinivasa Kalyanam	Srinivas		
2019	Gaddalakonda Ganesh	Himself	Cameo appearance	
2020	Bheeshma	Bheeshma Prasad		
2021	Check	Aditya		
2021	Rang De	Arjun		
2021	Maestro	Arun	Released on Hotstar	
2022	Macherla Niyojakavargam	Siddharth Reddy IAS		
2023	Extra Ordinary Man	Abhinay		
2025	Robinhood	Ram/Robinhood		
2025	Thammudu	Jai		
2026	Alias Rukmini †	Krishna		

=== As producer ===
Year	Title
2013	Gunde Jaari Gallanthayyinde
2014	Chinnadana Nee Kosam
2015	Akhil
2018	Chal Mohan Ranga

== Discography ==
Year	Film	Song	Notes	Ref.
2012	Ishq	"Lachhamma"	Also lyrics writer	
2013	Gunde Jaari Gallanthayyinde	"Ding Ding Ding"		

== Awards and nominations ==
Year	Award	Category	Film	Result	Ref.
2003	CineMAA Awards	Best Male Debut	Jayam	Won	
2002	Filmfare Awards South	Best Male Debut – South	Jayam	Won	
2012	Filmfare Awards South	Best Actor – Telugu	Ishq	Nominated	
2013	Filmfare Awards South	Best Actor – Telugu	Gunde Jaari Gallanthayyinde	Nominated	
2013	Hyderabad Times Film Awards	Best Actor – Male	Ishq	Nominated	
2004	Santosham Film Awards	Best Young Performer	Sri Anjaneyam	Won	
2014	South Indian International Movie Awards	Best Actor – Telugu	Gunde Jaari Gallanthayyinde	Nominated	
2016	South Indian International Movie Awards	Best Actor – Telugu	A Aa	Nominated	
2020	South Indian International Movie Awards	Best Actor – Telugu	Bheeshma	Nominated	
