= Vikram Kumar =

Indian film director and screenwriter

Vikram K. Kumar
- Born: Thrissur, Kerala, India
- Occupations: Film director; screenwriter
- Years active: 1998–present
- Spouse: Srinidhi Venkatesh

Vikram K. Kumar is an Indian film director and screenwriter who works in Telugu and Tamil cinema. He is known for directing Yavarum Nalam (2009; 13B in Hindi), Ishq (2011), Manam (2014), 24 (2016), Hello (2017) and Nani's Gang Leader (2019).

== Early life and career ==
Kumar graduated from Madras Christian College in Chennai. In April 1997 he joined director Priyadarshan, working on the Malayalam film Chandralekha as assistant director. He also worked under Priyadarshan in Doli Saja Ke Rakhna and Hera Pheri.

In 1998, he directed his breakthrough non-feature film, Silent Scream, for which he won the National Film Award For Best Instructional Film. He made his directorial debut in Telugu cinema industry with Ishtam in 2001, and then directed a bilingual movie in Tamil and Hindi languages, each with the same lead pair and separate supporting cast. The Tamil version was titled Yavarum Nalam while the Hindi version was titled 13B.

In 2014, he scripted and directed Manam which was screened at the 45th International Film Festival of India in the Homage to Akkineni Nageswara Rao section on 29 November 2014. The film garnered the Filmfare Award for Best Film - Telugu. He then directed the box-office hits such as the science-fiction 24 (2016), which won two awards at the 64th National Film Awards, and the comedy-thriller Gang Leader (2019).

== Filmography ==
Key
†	Denotes films that have not yet been released

=== Films ===
Year	Film	Language	Notes
1998	Silent Scream	English	
2001	Ishtam	Telugu	credited as Vikram
2003	Alai	Tamil	credited as Vikram
2009	13B	Hindi; Tamil	Bilingual film
2012	Ishq	Telugu	
2014	Manam	Telugu	
2016	24	Tamil	
2017	Hello	Telugu	
2019	Nani's Gang Leader	Telugu	
2022	Thank You	Telugu	

=== Web series ===
Year	Title	Platform	Notes
2023	Dhootha	Amazon Prime Video	

== Awards ==
National Film Awards

- National Film Award for Best Educational/Motivational/Instructional Film (director) Silent Scream (1998)

Filmfare Awards South

- Filmfare Award for Best Director - Telugu - Manam (2014)

Santosham Film Awards

- Santosham Best Film Award - Manam (2014)
