= Ishq (2012 film) =

- Film poster
- Directed by: Vikram Kumar
- Screenplay by: Vikram Kumar; Harsha Vardhan
- Story by: Vikram Kumar
- Produced by: N. Sudhakar Reddy; Vikram Goud
- Starring: Nithiin; Nithya Menen; Ajay; Sindhu Tolani
- Cinematography: P. C. Sreeram
- Edited by: A. Sreekar Prasad
- Music by: Anup Rubens; Aravind–Shankar
- Production company: Shresht Movies
- Release date: 24 February 2012
- Running time: 160 minutes
- Language: Telugu
- Budget: ₹7.8 crore
- Box office: est. ₹20 crore

Ishq (transl. Love) is a 2012 Indian Telugu-language romantic action comedy film written and directed by Vikram Kumar. The film was produced by Vikram Goud under Shresht Movies banner. The film features Nithiin and Nithya Menen in the lead roles with Ajay and Sindhu Tolani in pivotal roles. Cinematography for the film was handled by P. C. Sreeram and the music was composed by Anup Rubens and the duo Aravind–Shankar.

Ishq was released on 24 February 2012 to positive reviews and became one of the highest-grossing films of 2012. The film won the Nandi Award for Best Home-viewing Feature Film. It was only commercial success movie of actor Nithin in last 7 years after Sye (2004).

It has been remade in Odia as Akhire Akhire (2014), in Bengali (Bangladesh) as Love Station (2014), in Bengali (India) as Aashiqui (2015), and in Tamil as Uyire Uyire (2016).

== Plot ==
The film begins with a scene where the injured Siva (Ajay) is being rushed to the hospital. His father (Nagineedu) scolds him for his rogue behavior and disowns him and says that he will only return if Siva changes. It turns out that Siva had failed in a love affair with a girl named Divya.

Three years later Rahul (Nithiin), a very jovial and friendly guy and has just finished semester exams in Delhi and heads back to Hyderabad, to his family for a vacation. Meanwhile, Priya (Nithya Menen), a beautiful and lively girl, is going to Hyderabad to take her semester exams and meet her brother. Rahul and Priya both notice each others' actions on their way to the airport but not their faces. At the airport, Rahul plays a prank on Priya after he recognizes her by her bracelets and tattoo he saw earlier which annoys Priya. While flying to Hyderabad he falls for her. Unexpected circumstances force their plane to land in Goa. There, Rahul apologizes for his behavior. Priya recognizes Rahul as the person who recovered the toy for the child earlier at the traffic jam after Rahul recognizes his cap. Priya then befriends Rahul.

Rahul takes Priya to his friend's marriage in Goa and promises her a wonderful time. He introduces Priya as his wife to Jaya (Rohini), the wedding groom's mother. Jaya treats Priya like a princess and gives her a great time. Later, Priya is saved by Rahul after a few goons try to rape her at the beach. Slowly Rahul and Priya become very close friends and develop feelings for each other. Jaya finds out that Priya is not Rahul's wife as they are about to depart and tells Rahul to confess his feelings for her as soon as possible and gives him the bracelets she bought for Rahul's future wife. By the time they get to Hyderabad, they are deeply in love with each other.

But as Rahul is about to confess his feelings for her at the airport, he sees Priya being received by her brother, who turns out to be Siva. The girl Siva failed in love with was none other than Rahul's older sister, Divya (Sindhu Tolani). In the flashback, Siva torments Divya in the name of love. After Siva finds out that Divya got engaged, he threatens her and throws away the engagement ring that was given to her by her mother-in-law-to-be who has a sentimental value towards the ring. After Rahul finds Divya searching for the ring late night, he finds out what happened. Rahul goes to Siva and beats him up severely and finds the ring, which was why he was taken to the hospital in the beginning of the movie. As a result, Siva develops hatred towards Rahul.

Now Siva is a changed decent man, a successful entrepreneur, and married to Geetha (Satya Krishnan). But the couple does not have kids, which always bothers Siva. Meanwhile, Siva's mother (Sudha) convinces his father to go visit Siva to see if he has changed. Rahul finally confesses his love to Priya. But Siva finds out that Priya is in love with Rahul and beats him up. Upon arrival, Siva's father is convinced that Siva has changed and happily reunites with him. But just as Siva receives his father, an injured Rahul falls in front of them. Siva takes him to the hospital. Unaware of the situation, Siva's father asks Rahul about what happened. Rahul tells him everything but by keeping the identities anonymous. Siva's father befriends Rahul. Rahul plays a game with Siva to become close to his family and get Priya. But Siva threatens Divya to harm her and Rahul if Rahul does not leave Priya alone. Rahul tells Siva and his father that he will forget his girlfriend.

Later, Siva's father asks Siva to ask Rahul if he will marry Priya. Siva realizes that Rahul was manipulating all of them and decides to get Rahul killed and hires a local goon Kala (Supreeth). But he finds out that Kala's brother had attempted to rape Priya in Goa and got beaten up by Rahul. He starts beating Kala's brother and Kala beats Siva badly. Priya who was on a phone conversation with Siva calls Rahul and tells him to save Siva. Rahul goes there and beats up Kala and saves Siva. Siva realizes that Rahul's love is sincere. Siva later wakes up in the hospital and finds out that Geetha is finally pregnant. He finally agrees for Rahul to be with Priya and the movie ends on a happy note as the three walk in rain under umbrella.

== Cast ==
- Nithiin as Rahul
- Nithya Menon as Priya
- Ajay as Siva, Priya's elder brother
- Sindhu Tolani as Divya, Rahul's elder sister
- Rohini as Jaya
- Nagineedu as Priya's father
- Sudha as Priya's mother
- Ali as Rahul's friend
- Srinivasa Reddy as Siva's assistant
- Supreeth as Kala
- Ravi Prakash as Prabhu, Siva's friend
- Thagubothu Ramesh as Rahul's friend
- Rathna Shekar Reddy as Raza
- Satya Krishnan as Geetha, Siva's wife
- Madhunandan as Prem, Jaya's son and Rahul's best friend
- Charandeep as Kala's henchman
- Sandhya Janak

== Soundtrack ==
Ishq

Soundtrack album by Anup Rubens
- Released: 2 February 2012
- Recorded: 2012
- Genre: Feature film soundtrack
- Length: 24:55
- Language: Telugu
- Label: Aditya Music
- Producer: Anup Rubens

The soundtrack of the film was composed by Anup Rubens and Aravind–Shankar. was released in Hyderabad on 2 February 2012. The soundtrack was distributed worldwide by Aditya Music. Pawan Kalyan attended the audio launch. Krishna Chaitanya penned 4 songs in the film and Anantha Sreeram penned the remaining 2 songs. Both Nitin and Nithya have lent their voice for songs in the album. As part of publicity, the song "Lachhamma" was released through internet prior to the audio release and has garnered good response.

Tracklist
No.	Title	Lyrics	Music	Artist(s)	Length
1.	"Lachhamma"	Nithiin, Krishna Chaitanya	Anup Rubens	Anup Rubens, Nithiin, Thagubothu Ramesh, Murali	03:45
2.	"Oh Priya Priya"	Krishna Chaitanya	Anup Rubens	Adnan Sami, Nithya Menen	04:22
3.	"Sutiga Choodaku"	Anantha Sreeram	Aravind Shankar	Hariharan, Saindhavi	05:05
4.	"Chinnadana Neekosam"	Krishna Chaitanya	Anup Rubens	Raj Hasan, Anoop Rubens, Sravani	03:42
5.	"Edho Edho"	Anantha Sreeram	Aravind Shankar	Pradeep Vijay, Kalyani Nair	04:32
6.	"Lachhamma (Rubens Club Mix)"	Nithiin, Krishna Chaitanya	Anup Rubens	Anup Rubens, Nithiin, Thagubothu Ramesh, Murali	03:29
Total length:					24.55

== Critical response ==
The film received positive response from both fans and critics and became huge success in Nithiin's career. The film completed 50 days as per 13 April 2012, and 100 days in 11 centres all over Andhra as per 2 June 2012. 123Telugu.com and some other film media sites praises Ishq movie for achieving a rare feat. Nitin also tweeted that 'ishq' is the only movie ran in 7 direct centres without deficit this year as it has a very short range of release.

== Box office ==
The film was made with a budget of 7.8 crores and did well at box office to become a hit.

== Accolades ==
Ceremony	Category	Nominee	Result
2012 Nandi Awards	Best Home-viewing Feature Film	Sudhakar Reddy	Won
2012 Nandi Awards	Best Supporting Actor	Ajay	Won
2nd South Indian International Movie Awards	Best Film (Telugu)	Vikram Goud	Nominated
2nd South Indian International Movie Awards	Best Director (Telugu)	Vikram Kumar	Nominated
2nd South Indian International Movie Awards	Best Cinematographer (Telugu)	P. C. Sreeram	Nominated
2nd South Indian International Movie Awards	Best Supporting Actor (Telugu)	Ajay	Nominated
2nd South Indian International Movie Awards	Best Supporting Actress (Telugu)	Sindhu Tolani	Nominated
2nd South Indian International Movie Awards	Best Comedian (Telugu)	Ali	Nominated

== Remakes ==
A Bangladeshi remake of this film titled Love Station starring Bappy Chowdhury and Misty Jannat was released on 5 September 2014. It was remade in Bengali as Aashiqui starring Ankush Hazra and Nusrat Faria Mazhar in 2015, in Tamil as Uyire Uyire (2015), in Odia as Akhire Akhire starring Babushan, Jhillik and Siddhanta Mahapatra. The film was later dubbed into Malayalam as Aye Priya.
