= SIIMA Award for Best Lyricist – Telugu =

Indian award for lyricist

- Awarded for: Best Lyrics writer of a song in Telugu cinema
- Country: India
- Presented by: Vibri Media Group
- First award: 21 June 2012 (for films released in 2011)
- Most recent winner: Purna Chary, Court: State vs a Nobody (2025)

Highlights
- Most wins: Chandrabose and Ramajogayya Sastry (4)
- Most nominations: Ramajogayya Sastry (13)

SIIMA Award for Best Lyricist – Telugu is presented by Vibri media group as part of its annual South Indian International Movie Awards, for the best lyric writer of a Telugu film song. The award was first given in 2012 for songs and films released in 2011.

== Superlatives ==
Categories	Recipient	Record
Most wins	Chandrabose	4
Most wins	Ramajogayya Sastry	4
Most consecutive wins	Chandrabose	2 (2021–2022)
Most nominations	Ramajogayya Sastry	13
Most consecutive nominations	Ramajogayya Sastry	12 (2011–2022)
Most nominations without a win	Krishna Kanth	4
Oldest winner	Sirivennela Seetharama Sastry	Age 61 (5th SIIMA)
Youngest winner	Anantha Sriram	Age 30 (3rd SIIMA)
Oldest nominee	Siva Shakthi Datta	Age 85 (7th SIIMA)
Youngest nominee	Sri Mani	Age 25 (3rd SIIMA)

== Winners ==
Year	Lyricist	Song	Film	Ref
2011	Ramajogayya Sastry	"Guruvaram March"	Dookudu	
2012	Bhaskarabhatla	"Sir Osthara"	Businessman	
2013	Anantha Sriram	"Seethamma Vakitlo"	Seethamma Vakitlo Sirimalle Chettu	
2014	Chandrabose	"Kani Penchina"	Manam	
2015	Sirivennela Seetharama Sastry	"Itu Itu Itu"	Kanche	
2016	Ramajogayya Sastry	"Pranaamam"	Janatha Garage	
2017	Suddala Ashok Teja	"Vachinde"	Fidaa	
2018	Chandrabose	"Yentha Sakkagunnave"	Rangasthalam	
2019	Sri Mani	"Idhe Kadha"	Maharshi	
2020	Ramajogayya Sastry	"Butta Bomma"	Ala Vaikunthapurramuloo	
2021	Chandrabose	"Srivalli"	Pushpa: The Rise	
2022	Chandrabose	"Naatu Naatu"	RRR	
2023	Anantha Sriram	"O Rendu Prema Meghaalila"	Baby	
2024	Ramajogayya Sastry	"Chuttamalle"	Devara: Part 1	
2025	Purna Chary	"Premalo"	Court: State vs a Nobody	

== Nominations ==
- 2011: Ramajogayya Sastry – "Guruvaram March" from Dookudu
  - Chandrabose – "Infatuation" from 100% Love
  - Jonnavittula Ramalingeswara Rao – "Jagadananda Karaka" from Sri Rama Rajyam
  - Anantha Sriram – "Chali Chaliga" from Mr. Perfect
  - Siva Shakthi Datta – "Gijigadu" from Rajanna
- 2012: Bhaskarabhatla – "Sir Osthara" from Businessman
  - Vanamali – "Amma Ani Kothaga" from Life Is Beautiful
  - Devi Sri Prasad – "O Madhu" from Julai
  - Ramajogayya Sastry – "Ga Ee Ga Ee Ga Ee" from Eega
  - Sirivennela Seetharama Sastry – "Jaruguthunnaadi" from Krishnam Vande Jagadgurum
- 2013: Anantha Sriram – "Seethamma Vakitlo" from Seethamma Vakitlo Sirimalle Chettu
  - Sri Mani – "Aaradugula Bullettu" from Attarintiki Daredi
  - Ramajogayya Sastry – "Banthi Poola Janaki" from Baadshah
  - Bhaskarabhatla – "Top Lesi Poddi" from Iddarammayilatho
  - Vanamali – "Padipoya" from DK Bose
- 2014: Chandrabose – "Kani Penchina" from Manam
  - Sirivennela Seetharama Sastry – "Nandalala" from Mukunda
  - Ramajogayya Sastry – "Nee Kanti Choopullo" from Legend
  - Anantha Sriram – "Em Sandeham Ledu" from Oohalu Gusagusalade
  - Vanamali – "Sari Povu Koti" from Karthikeya
- 2015: Sirivennela Seetharama Sastry – "Itu Itu Itu" from Kanche
  - Devi Sri Prasad – "Super Machi" from S/O Satyamurthy
  - Ramajogayya Sastry – "O Manishi" from Yevade Subramanyam
  - Ramajogayya Sastry – "Rama Rama" from Srimanthudu
  - Siva Shakthi Datta – "Mamatala Thalli" from Baahubali: The Beginning
- 2016: Ramajogayya Sastry – "Pranaamam" from Janatha Garage
  - Bhaskarabhatla – "Oka Laalana" from Jyo Achyutananda
  - Chandrabose – "Chusa Chusa" from Dhruva
  - Sira Sri – "Maranam Adi Tadhyam" from Vangaveeti
  - Sri Mani – "Thelusa Thelusa" from Sarrainodu
- 2017: Suddala Ashok Teja – "Vachinde" from Fidaa
  - Chandrabose – "Nuvvele Nuvvele" from Jaya Janaki Nayaka
  - Ramajogayya Sastry – "Nilavade" from Sathamanam Bhavati
  - Siva Shakthi Datta – "Saahore Baahubali" from Baahubali 2: The Conclusion
  - Sri Mani – "Bramaramba Ki" from Rarandoi Veduka Chudham
- 2018: Chandrabose – "Yentha Sakkagunnave" from Rangasthalam
  - Anantha Sriram – "Inkem Inkem" from Geetha Govindam
  - Krishna Kanth – "Maate Vinadugaa" from Taxiwaala
  - Ramajogayya Sastry – "Peniviti" from Aravinda Sametha Veera Raghava
  - Sirivennela Seetharama Sastry – "Mooga Manasulu" from Mahanati
- 2019: Sri Mani – "Idhe Kadha" from Maharshi
  - Sirivennela Seetharama Sastry – "Nee Raka Kosam" from Yatra
  - M. M. Keeravani, Dr. K. Rama Krishna & K. Siva Shakti Datta – "Rajarshi" from NTR: Kathanayakudu
  - Krishna Kanth – "Needa Padadhani" from Jersey
  - Chaitanya Prasad – "Priyathama Priyathama" from Majili
- 2020: Ramajogayya Sastry – "Butta Bomma" from Ala Vaikunthapurramuloo
  - Sirivennela Seetharama Sastry – "The Life of Ram" from Jaanu
  - Kittu Vissapragada – "Tharagathi Gadhi" from Colour Photo
  - Devi Sri Prasad – "Sarileru Neekevvaru Anthem" from Sarileru Neekevvaru
  - Srinivasa Mouli – "Emo Emo" from Raahu
- 2021: Chandrabose – "Srivalli" from Pushpa: The Rise
  - Mittapalli Surender – "Nee Chitram Choosi" from Love Story
  - Sri Mani – "Leharaayi" from Most Eligible Bachelor
  - Ramajogayya Sastry – "Maguva Maguva" from Vakeel Saab
  - Kalyan Chakravarthy – "Amma Song" from Akhanda
- 2022: Chandrabose – "Naatu Naatu" from RRR
  - Krishna Kanth – "Inthandham" from Sita Ramam
  - M. M. Keeravani – "Neetho Unte Chalo" from Bimbisara
  - Ramajogayya Sastry – "Laahe Laahe" from Acharya
  - Suddala Ashok Teja – "Komuram Bheemudo" from RRR
- 2023: Anantha Sriram – "O Rendu Prema Meghaalila" from Baby
  - Bhaskarabhatla – "Nuvvu Navvukuntu" from Mad
  - Kasarla Shyam – "Ooru Palletooru" from Balagam
  - Krishna Kanth – "Adigaa" from Hi Nanna
  - Sri Mani – "Ori Vaari" from Dasara
- 2024: Ramajogayya Sastry – "Chuttamalle" from Devara: Part 1
  - Anantha Sriram – "Kalyani Vaccha Vacchaa" from The Family Star
  - Chandrabose – "Sooseki" from Pushpa 2: The Rule
  - Kasarla Shyam – "Poolamme Pilla" from Hanu-Man
  - Sri Mani – "Nijame Ne Chebutunna" from Ooru Peru Bhairavakona
- 2025: Purna Chary – "Premalo" from Court: State vs a Nobody
  - Ram Pothineni – "Nuvvunte Chaley" from Andhra King Taluka
  - Bhaskarabhatla – "Godari Gattu" from Sankranthiki Vasthunam
  - Sri Mani – "Bujji Thalli" from Thandel
  - Vanamali – "Parichayamila" from 8 Vasantalu
