= Oka Laila Kosam (soundtrack) =

Soundtrack album by Anup Rubens
- Released: 31 July 2014
- Recorded: 2014
- Genre: Feature film soundtrack
- Length: 21:22
- Language: Telugu
- Label: Aditya Music
- Producer: Anup Rubens

Anup Rubens chronology
Manam (2014)	Oka Laila Kosam (2014)	Temper (2015)
External audio
- Official Audio Jukebox on YouTube

Singles from Oka Laila Kosam
- 1. "Ee Chinni Life Needhe" Released: 1 August 2014; 2. "O Meri Janejana" Released: 5 August 2014; 3. "Oka Laila Kosam Remix" Released: 7 August 2014

Oka Laila Kosam is the soundtrack album composed by Anup Rubens for the 2014 Telugu-language romantic comedy film of the same name starring Naga Chaitanya and Pooja Hegde in lead roles, directed by Vijay Kumar Konda. The film marks Rubens' second collaboration with Vijay aKumar Konda after Gunde Jaari Gallanthayyinde (2013) and third collaboration with Chaitanya after Manam (2014) and Autonagar Surya (2014). The album consists of six songs with Vanamali, Phani Chandra, Sri Mani, Dasari Narayana Rao, and Anantha Sriram penning the lyrics. The soundtrack album released digitally on 31 July 2014 on the Aditya Music label. The album received positive reviews from critics.

== Development ==
Anup Rubens was signed to compose music for the film. The film marks Rubens' second collaboration with Vijay aKumar Konda after Gunde Jaari Gallanthayyinde (2013) and third collaboration with Chaitanya after Manam (2014) and Autonagar Surya (2014). Vanamali, Phani Chandra, Sri Mani, Dasari Narayana Rao, and Anantha Sriram penned the lyrics of the songs.

Vijay revealed that the soundtrack would feature a remixed version of the song "Oka Laila Kosam" from the film Ramudu Kadu Krishnudu (1983) after which this film is titled. "The director suggested we remix it as it would be suitable for the situation. We convinced Anup Rubens (music composer) and he did it. Then the film was also named 'Oka Laila Kosam' as it was apt and blended well," Chaitanya added.

It was reported in mid-August 2014 that the film's soundtrack is scheduled for a release on 15 August 2014 with one of the songs being launched at Hyderabad and two songs being launched at PVP Mall in Vijayawada. The film's soundtrack was purchased by Aditya Music.

== Composition ==
The first song "Ee Chinni Life Needhe" was recorded by Alphons Joseph and Rubens with lyrics written by Vanamali. The next track "O Cheli Nuvve Na Cheli" was sung by Adnan Sami and Ramya Behara and penned by Phani Chandra. The track "O Meri Jane Jana" was sung by Javed Ali and Sweekar Agasthi with lyrics by Sri Mani.

The song "Oka Laila Kosam" was sung by S. P. Charan and Divya with lyrics written by Dasari Narayana Rao. The track "Teluse Nuvvu Ravani" written by Anantha Sriram was sung by Ankit Tiwari. The track "Rubens Club Mix (Mash up)" was performed by Anup Rubens himself.

== Marketing and release ==
On 7 August 2014, it was reported that film's film single is scheduled to release on 15 August 2014 at Hyderabad. The first single titled "Freedom (Ee Chinni Life)" was released on 15 August, on the occasion of Independence Day. was released between 6:00 pm to 7:00 pm in Maa Music and between 7:00 pm to 8:00 pm in Red FM 93.5 by Naga Chaitanya, Pooja Hegde and Vijay Kumar Konda.

The songs "O Meri Jane Jana" and "Oka Laila Kosam" were released at PVP Mall in Vijayawada on 17 August 2014. Naga Chaitanya, Pooja Hegde, Vijay Kumar Konda and Anoop Rubens was present at the songs launch. However, the event ended on an ugly note as people were seen pushing each other while hooting and cheering for casts who tried to get closer to then and the situation soon got out of hand as a mini stampede ensued in the mall. The incident forced the police to resort to lathi charge to bring the crowd under control.

The rest of the songs "O Cheli Nuvve Na Cheli", "Teluse Nuvvu Ravani", and "Rubens Club Mix (Mash up)" was released on 22 August 2014 at an event. The songs were released digitally on 23 August by Aditya Music.

== Reception ==
The album received positive reviews from critics.

Reviewing the soundtrack, a critic of The Times of India wrote "On the whole, the album looks good with a blend of melodies and fast paced numbers." Jeevi of Idlebrain wrote "Anup Rubens has given classy background music. Songs are alright."

Suresh Kavirayani of Deccan Chronicle write "Good background score is a pre-requisite for any good film and Anoop Rubens’ music compliments the tone of the movie".

The platinum disc function was held on 3 September 2014, at the Shilpakala Vedika in Hyderabad, which coincides with the 100th day celebrations of Manam. The audio success meet was held on 13 October 2014, on Pooja Hegde's birthday at Hyderabad.

== Track listing ==
No.	Title	Lyrics	Artist(s)	Length
1.	"Ee Chinni Life Needhe"	Vanamali	Anup Rubens, Alphons Joseph	04:10
2.	"O Cheli Nuvve Na Cheli"	Phani Chandra	Adnan Sami, Ramya Behara	04:04
3.	"O Meri Jane Jana"	Sri Mani	Javed Ali	04:00
4.	"Oka Laila Kosam Remix"	Dasari Narayana Rao	S. P. B. Charan, Sravana Bhargavi	04:11
5.	"Teluse Nuvvu Ravani"	Anantha Sreeram	Ankit Tiwari	03:41
6.	"Rubens Club Mix" (Mashup)	–	Anup Rubens	01:14
Total length:				21:22
