= Aravinda =

Aravinda may refer to:

== People ==
- Aravinda Akurugoda (born 1996), Sri Lankan cricketer
- Aravinda Bandara (born 1995), Sri Lankan cricketer
- Aravinda Chakravarti (born 1954), Indian geneticist
- Aravinda de Silva (born 1965), Sri Lankan cricketer
- Aravinda Bala Pajanor (1935–2013), Indian politician,
- Aravinda Premaratne (born 1992), Sri Lankan cricketer
- Chandana Aravinda (born 1982), Sri Lankan cricketer
- Madhumadhawa Aravinda, Sri Lankan singer
- S.D. Aravinda, Indian film director
- Chadalavada Aravinda Babu, Indian politician

== Other uses ==
- Aravinda Sametha Veera Raghava, film
- Aravinda Sametha Veera Raghava (soundtrack)
