= Srimanthudu (soundtrack) =

2015 soundtrack album by Devi Sri Prasad

- Soundtrack album cover

Soundtrack album by Devi Sri Prasad
- Released: 10 July 2015
- Recorded: 2014–2015
- Genre: Feature film soundtrack
- Length: 23:14
- Language: Telugu
- Label: Aditya Music
- Producer: Devi Sri Prasad

Devi Sri Prasad chronology
S/O Satyamurthy (2015)	Srimanthudu (2015)	Puli (2014)

Srimanthudu is the soundtrack to the 2014 film of the same name directed by Koratala Siva and produced by Mythri Movie Makers and G. Mahesh Babu Entertainment. Starring Mahesh Babu, Shruti Haasan, Jagapati Babu and Rajendra Prasad, with Sampath Raj, Mukesh Rishi, Sukanya and Harish Uthaman in supporting roles, the film featured six songs composed by Devi Sri Prasad with lyrics written by Ramajogayya Sastry and Prasad co-writing the lyrics for the song "Charuseela". Raju Sundaram, Dinesh and Bosco–Caesar handled the choreography for the song sequences. The soundtrack was released by Aditya Music on 10 July 2015.

== Development ==
Srimanthudu is Prasad's second collaboration with both Babu and Siva, following Mirchi (2013) and 1: Nenokkadine (2014). The soundtrack featured six songs in a variety of genres ranging from folk, melody to uplifting numbers, which Prasad felt that the music strikes a chord from all sections of audience. Babu ensured the lyrics should be clearly heard and each song has a value in it.

During the production in Karaikudi and at Ramoji Film City, Siva explained the situation to Sastry who took inputs from the farmer and developed the song "Jaago". Sastry said that it took him more time to complete the lyrics for "Jaago" in comparison to other songs. Composed in the indie rock genre, the song was performed by Raghu Dixit and Rita Thyagarajan. Haasan revealed that "Charuseela" was based on her character in the film, and the tune was inspired by one of Michael Jackson's compositions. Regarding that song, Prasad described it as a "peppy dance number" with a fusion of Telugu words with English slang and Prasad "incorporated the Michael Jackson rhythm in the song".

Prasad simultaneously re-recorded the soundtrack in Tamil for the film's dubbed version Selvandhan which progressed on late-July and early-August 2014. Aditya Music marketed the film's soundtrack after purchasing the music rights to ₹1 crore (US$110,000).

== Release ==
The film's soundtrack was launched on 10 July 2015 at the Shilpakala Vedika in Hyderabad with the cast and crew in attendance. It was further broadcast live on YouTube channels of the production company and record label, as well as its televised premiere on TV9 Telugu and Zee Telugu and other television channels. It was digitally released on the same date of the launch event. The soundtrack for the film's Tamil version Selvandhan was launched at an event held at Sathyam Cinemas in Chennai on 4 August 2015.

== Track listing ==
=== Telugu ===
All lyrics are written by Ramajogayya Sastry, except where noted.

No.	Title	Artist(s)	Length
1.	"Ramulodu Vachinaduro"	Sooraj Santhosh, Ranina Reddy	4:45
2.	"Jatha Kalise"	Sagar, Suchitra	3:44
3.	"Charuseela Swapnabala" (Co-written by Devi Sri Prasad)	Yazin Nizar, Devi Sri Prasad (Rap)	4:15
4.	"Srimanthudaa"	M. L. R. Karthikeyan	2:03
5.	"Jaago"	Raghu Dixit, Rita	4:11
6.	"Dhimmathirigae"	Simha, Geetha Madhuri, Priya Himesh	4:41
Total length:			23:14

=== Tamil ===
All lyrics are written by Viveka.

No.	Title	Artist(s)	Length
1.	"Rama Rama"	Sooraj Santhosh, M. M. Manasi	4:45
2.	"Ila Manase"	Sagar, Suchitra	4:09
3.	"Charuseela"	Yazin Nizar, Devi Sri Prasad (Rap)	4:40
4.	"Selvandhaney"	V. V. Prasanna	2:28
5.	"Jaago"	Raghu Dixit, Rita	4:32
6.	"Dhammathundu"	Mukesh, Priya Hemesh	5:07
Total length:			23:56

== Reception ==
The Times of India gave the soundtrack 3.5 out of 5 stars describing it as a "typical DSP soundtrack". IndiaGlitz gave the soundtrack 3.25 out of 5 stars and stated, "The album caters to the fan base of both DSP and Mahesh Babu. DSP delivers the output in such a way as to give 'Mirchi' feeling, adding an impressive array of tunes." Behindwoods gave the soundtrack 3 out of 5 stars and called it a signature album with Prasad's trademark reflected all over it. Critic based at 123Telugu described the album as "a mixed bag which has something for everyone and surely lives up to its hype". Subramanian Harikumar of Bollywood Life rated 3 out of 5 stars describing it as a "decent album" which emphasizes on "crowd pleasing numbers" Karthik Srinivasan of Milliblog described the album is "just more of what Devi usually — always — produces".

== Accolades ==
Ceremony	Category	Nominee	Result	Ref.
63rd Filmfare Awards South	Best Music Director – Telugu	Devi Sri Prasad	Won	
63rd Filmfare Awards South	Best Lyricist – Telugu	Ramajogayya Sastry (for "Srimanthuda")	Nominated	
63rd Filmfare Awards South	Best Male Playback Singer – Telugu	M. L. R. Karthikeyan (for "Srimanthuda")	Won	
63rd Filmfare Awards South	Best Male Playback Singer – Telugu	Yazin Nizar (for "Charuseela")	Nominated	
IIFA Utsavam 2015	Best Music Direction	Devi Sri Prasad	Won	
IIFA Utsavam 2015	Best Lyrics	Ramajogayya Sastry (for "Rama Rama", "Charuseela", "Jaago")	Won	
IIFA Utsavam 2015	Best Playback Singer – Male	Sagar (for "Jatha Kalise")	Won	
5th South Indian International Movie Awards	Best Music Director – Telugu	Devi Sri Prasad	Won	
5th South Indian International Movie Awards	Best Lyricist – Telugu	Ramajogayya Sastry (for "Rama Rama")	Won	
5th South Indian International Movie Awards	Best Male Playback Singer – Telugu	Raghu Dixit (for "Jaago")	Nominated	
5th South Indian International Movie Awards	Best Male Playback Singer – Telugu	Sagar (for "Jatha Kalise")	Won	
14th Santosham Film Awards	Best Music Director Award	Devi Sri Prasad	Won	
Nandi Awards of 2015	Best Lyricist	Ramajogayya Sastry (for "O Nindu Bhumi")	Won	
