= Aravinda Sametha Veera Raghava (soundtrack) =

2018 soundtrack album by S. Thaman

- Soundtrack album cover

Soundtrack album by Thaman S
- Released: 20 September 2018
- Recorded: 2018
- Genre: Feature film soundtrack
- Length: 19:06
- Language: Telugu
- Label: Zee Music Company
- Producer: Thaman S

Thaman S chronology
Chal Mohan Ranga (2018)	Aravinda Sametha Veera Raghava (2018)	Amar Akbar Anthony (2018)
External audio
- Audio Jukebox on YouTube

Singles from Aravinda Sametha Veera Raghava
- 1. "Anaganaganaga" Released: 15 September 2018; 2. "Peniviti" Released: 19 September 2018

Aravinda Sametha Veera Raghava is the soundtrack album composed by Thaman S for the 2018 Telugu action drama film of the same name starring N. T. Rama Rao Jr. and Pooja Hegde in the lead roles, directed by Trivikram Srinivas. Initially, Anirudh Ravichander was announced as the music director, but due to creative differences with Srinivas, he was backed out from the project and Thaman came on board, thereby making his first collaboration with Srinivas, and his fifth collaboration with Jr. NTR. The album featured four tracks, with a fifth track being released as an additional; lyrics for the songs were written by Sirivennela Seetharama Sastry, Ramajogayya Sastry and Penchal Das.

The album received positive reviews from critics. The tracks "Anaganaganaga" and "Peniviti" were released as singles, while others tracks were released with album. The soundtrack album was released on 20 September 2018 under the Zee Music Company record label.

== Development ==
The film was initially announced with Anirudh Ravichander as the music director in November 2017. However, Anirudh was opted out from the project following creative differences with the director Trivikram Srinivas, due to the failure of their previous association, Agnyaathavaasi (2018). Later, S. Thaman was announced as the composer for this project, in his first collaboration with Srinivas. It also marked Thaman's fifth collaboration with N. T. Rama Rao Jr. after Brindavanam (2010), Baadshah (2013), Ramayya Vasthavayya (2013), and Rabhasa (2014). Thaman stated that it is a "dream come true moment" on working with the director, further stated that "NTR and Trivikram have always been supportive and encouraging. So, there's a huge comfort zone with them. I'm really excited about working with such a combination."

The music sessions began during May 2018, with Sirivennela Seetharama Sastry was hired as one of the primary lyricist and started recording one of the tracks with percussionist Sivamani. Penchal Das, was roped in to record and write two tracks while also mentoring Rao to learn the Seema dialect profoundly. As the story being set in Rayalaseema region, the team wanted a track with a "touch of Seema-dialect in the lyrics". Das, belonging to the same region, was roped by the team, as they had listened to few of their folk numbers and had in their mind, his the lyrics and vocals might bring authenticity. By mid-July, Thaman tweeted that the compositions for the film's soundtrack is nearing completion. During late-August, he started writing the film score and began working on the re-recording of the tracks in early-September 2018. The audio rights were of the film were purchased by Zee Music Company.

== Release ==
The first track of the film "Anaganaganaga" sung by Armaan Malik and written by Sirivennela Seetharama Sastry was released as a single on 15 September 2018. The song was appreciated by music lovers as "the number that has a touch of rock mixed in with classical notes". On 19 September, the second single track "Peniviti" was launched. Sung by Kaala Bhairava and written by Ramajogayya Sastry, which was termed as an intense, raw, rustic number. The same day, the track list of the soundtrack album was unveiled which further revealed that the album will have four songs. On 20 September 2018, the full album was released directly into the market, without hosting any promotional event for the release of the soundtrack. The lyrical videos of other tracks were unveiled later. All the tracks were performed by Thaman and his musical team during the pre-release event which was held at the H.I.C.C. Novotel hotel in Hyderabad on 2 October 2018.

Though the album features four songs, a fifth unreleased track titled "Reddamma Thalli" was released on 16 October 2018. Sung by Penchal Das, who also co-written the track with Ramajogayya Sastry, it is different from the version which was featured in the film, sung by Mohana Bhogaraju. The film version was only released as a part of the extended soundtrack (containing the soundtrack in its entirety, along with the additional track and the background score), which released on 25 October 2018. A review from Indiaglitz stated that "the song is laden with situational lyrics. Rooted in the culture of Seema, the song comes with authentic language and the emotions are spot-on." The makers released the lyric videos and the promos of the songs before the film's release.

== Reception ==
The album received positive response from critics and audiences. Neetishta Nyayapati from The Times of India, stated "Despite featuring only four numbers, the jukebox of Aravindha Sametha sets itself apart with its authenticity", however opined that "while the earthiness of the theme comes through the vocals and lyrics, it's missing in Thaman's music." 123Telugu reviewed it as, "There was a lot of expectation from Thaman as he was teaming up with Trivikram for the first time. But it looks like the ace composer has given importance to the emotions in the film rather than churning out commercial numbers. Peniviti and Anaganaganaga will be chartbusters and are our picks. Finally, the album of Aravinda Sametha is not your regular song and dance album and has been composed to gel with the narrative. It will grow on you slowly after watching the film on the big screen." Indiaglitz rated 3 out of 5 stars, and summarised it as "With just four songs, the album features two mood-based and two generic numbers." Cinejosh summarised it as "Aravinda Sametha weaves out a melodious album fitting in all the elements for an NTR and Trivikram combo film!"

== Track listing ==
Aravinda Sametha Veera Raghava (Original Motion Picture Track List)
No.	Title	Lyrics	Singer(s)	Length
1.	"Anaganaganaga"	Sirivennela Seetharama Sastry	Armaan Malik	4:47
2.	"Peniviti"	Ramajogayya Sastry	Kaala Bhairava	5:10
3.	"Yeda Poyinado"	Sirivennela Seetharama Sastry, Penchal Das	Nikhita Srivalli, Kailash Kher, Penchal Das	5:05
4.	"Reddy Ikkada Soodu"	Ramajogayya Sastry	Daler Mehndi, Anjana Sowmya	4:04
Total length:				19:06

Aravinda Sametha Veera Raghava (Extended Soundtrack)
No.	Title	Lyrics	Singer(s)	Length
1.	"Reddamma Thalli" (Film Version)	Ramajogayya Sastry, Penchal Das	Mohana Bhogaraju	1:57
Total length:				21:03

== Background score ==
Aravinda Sametha Veera Raghava

Film score by Thaman S
- Released: 25 October 2018
- Recorded: 2018
- Genre: Film score
- Length: 35:45
- Language: Telugu
- Label: Zee Music Company
- Producer: Thaman S
External audio
- Film score on YouTube

The original background score was released on 25 October 2018. The score featured 15 instrumental tracks, which was released separately in YouTube as a jukebox format. The score was bundled into the soundtrack album, earlier having four songs and a bonus track being featured.

No.	Title	Length
1.	"Home Coming"	1:13
2.	"Erra Padda Thadika Leru" (Part 1)	2:00
3.	"Erra Padda Thadika Leru" (Part 2)	2:07
4.	"Jeji Maata"	3:12
5.	"Balamainavaadu Pakkana Unte"	1:14
6.	"Pomodoro"	2:31
7.	"Mondi Katthi"	2:31
8.	"Kantapaddava"	5:13
9.	"Bathikochina Basi Reddy"	1:23
10.	"Chavuganna Gonthu Vunte"	2:29
11.	"Peace Meeting"	1:53
12.	"Torch Bearer"	2:06
13.	"Ishtam Leni Maarpu"	3:04
14.	"Walk Into Peace"	1:34
15.	"₹5 Faction"	3:08
Total length:		35:45

== Accolades ==
Ceremony	Category	Nominees	Result	Ref.
8th South Indian International Movie Awards	Best Music Director – Telugu	S. Thaman	Nominated	
8th South Indian International Movie Awards	Best Lyricist – Telugu	Ramajogayya Sastry for "Peniviti"	Nominated	
8th South Indian International Movie Awards	Best Male Playback Singer – Telugu	Kaala Bhairava for "Peniviti"	Nominated	
66th Filmfare Awards South	Best Music Director – Telugu	S. Thaman	Nominated	
66th Filmfare Awards South	Best Lyricist – Telugu	Ramajogayya Sastry for "Peniviti"	Nominated	
66th Filmfare Awards South	Best Male Playback Singer – Telugu	Kaala Bhairava for "Peniviti"	Nominated	
66th Filmfare Awards South	Best Female Playback Singer – Telugu	Mohana Bhogaraju for "Reddamma Thalli"	Nominated	
2nd Radio City Cine Awards Telugu	Best Music Director	S. Thaman	Won	
2nd Radio City Cine Awards Telugu	Best Background Score	S. Thaman	Won	
2nd Radio City Cine Awards Telugu	Best Lyricist	Ramajogayya Sastry for "Peniviti"	Won	
2nd Radio City Cine Awards Telugu	Best Male Playback Singer	Kaala Bhairava for "Peniviti"	Nominated	
2nd Radio City Cine Awards Telugu	Best Female Playback Singer	Mohana Bhogaraju for "Reddamma Thalli"	Nominated	
2nd Radio City Cine Awards Telugu	Best Song	"Peniviti"	Nominated	
17th Santosham Film Awards	Best Music Director	S. Thaman	Won	
