= Bolo Ta Ra Ra.. =

Studio album by Daler Mehndi
- Released: 23 January 1995 (Audio Cassette); 1 September 1995 (Audio CD)
- Genres: Bhangra, Indi-pop
- Length: 42:07
- Label: Magnasound
- Producer: Jawahar Wattal

Daler Mehndi chronology
Bolo Ta Ra Ra.. (1995)	Dardi Rab Rab (1996)

Bolo Ta Ra Ra.. is the 1995 debut album of Punjabi-language Bhangra singer Daler Mehndi. The album remains the top-selling non-film music Indian pop album. The album sold 20 million units, including more than a million in Kerala alone. It was released first on 23 January 1995 on cassette and then on 1 September 1995 on audio CD format.

== Track listing ==
No.	Title	Length
1.	"Bolo Ta Ra Ra.."	5:08
2.	"Soniye" (O Meri Soniye)	5:54
3.	"Dil Mera Nal Nal Nal"	4:40
4.	"Sun Baliye"	5:26
5.	"Sajna Door Na Javeen"	5:37
6.	"Ashke"	6:42
7.	"Ta Na Na Na"	3:56
8.	"Mennu Le Chal"	4:44
Total length:		42:07

== Credits ==
- Produced and composed by Jawahar Wattal
- Music arranged by Ravi Pawar
- Recorded Digitally at Adcamp, Delhi by S.C. Chawla
- Keyboards & Guitar: Edwyn A.J. Fernandes
- Rhythm by Babloo, Ramjoo
- Choreography: Kanchan Sachdev
- Music Video: Ken Ghosh
