= Attarintiki Daredi (soundtrack) =

- Official Soundtrack Album Disc Cover

Soundtrack album by Devi Sri Prasad
- Released: 19 July 2013
- Recorded: 2013
- Genre: Feature film soundtrack
- Length: 24:53
- Language: Telugu
- Label: Aditya Music
- Producer: Devi Sri Prasad

Devi Sri Prasad chronology
Singam II (2013)	Attarintiki Daredi (2013)	Bhai (2013)

Attarintiki Daredi is the feature film soundtrack of the 2013 film of the same name directed by Trivikram Srinivas starring Pawan Kalyan. The film's music and background score were composed by Devi Sri Prasad marking his immediate collaboration with Pawan Kalyan and Trivikram Srinivas Individually. The soundtrack consists of 6 songs and a bit song all composed by Devi Sri Prasad and Ramajogayya Sastry, Sri Mani and himself penning the lyrics. The album's release coincided with a promotional audio launch function on 19 July 2013 at Shilpakala Vedika in Hyderabad under high security arrangements on Aditya Music label.. The track consists of "Deva Devam Bhaje", a Kriti composed by Annamacharya in Raga Hindolam/Malkauns, but with new lyrics, written by Ramajogayya Shastri, exclusively for this film. The song has the voice of M S Subbulakshmi (the original singer of the kriti) retained, with extra vocals for the same lyrics by Rita, but the new lyrics were sung by Palakkad Sreeram.

== Production ==
In 2012, Trivikram hired his regular associate Devi Sri Prasad to compose music for this film with Pawan Kalyan thanks to the stupendous success of Jalsa which marked the trio's first collaboration which released in 2008. While scouting for the locations required for the film in Spain, the trio had the music sitting in Barcelona. Lyricist Sri Mani, in an interview to Sakshi Newspaper told that he wrote Aaradugula Bullet song challengingly as Trivikram asked him to write a song which satisfies both Hero's introduction and basic story line of the film. Devi Sri Prasad penned the lyrics for the song Ninnu Chudagane which he told in an interview as a bit boring song. The song Ninnu Chudagane was shot at Pollachi, Tamil Nadu in February while the songs Kirraaku and Bapu Gari Bommo were shot at Europe in June. In July the song Its Time to Party was shot at 7 acres property of Annapurna studios in which Pawan Kalyan, Samantha, Mumtaj, Hamsa Nandi and 100 others in the choreography of Ganesh Master. Pawan Kalyan was reported to croon for a folk song "Kaatama Rayuda", an old Traditional folk song earlier used in the 1940 film Sumangali whose tune was re-composed by V. Nagayya and lyrics were re-written by Samudrala Sr. which was confirmed by Devi Sri Prasad in his Twitter account after the release of the track. It was also informed later that Devi Sri Prasad would make a guest appearance in Ninnu Chudagane song written by him which was Trivikram's idea.

Later Aditya Music, who won the audio rights of the film, released an audio poster featuring Pawan Kalyan on 16 July 2013. Initially the film's audio was planned to be released directly into the market. However, after much speculation, it was revealed by Samantha that the film's audio would be released at Shilpakala Vedika in Hyderabad. On 19 July 2013 the audio was launched under very tight security arrangements with no chief guest and outsiders being invited and Pawan Kalyan, Samantha, Trivikram and rest of the film's unit celebrating the event along with the audience. After the audio released and became a huge hit, the recording video of Kaatama Rayuda was released into the Internet media featuring Pawan Kalyan, Devi Sri Prasad, Trivikram, B.V.S.N. Prasad. The song made waves in the social media in 48 hours with close to half a million hits on YouTube.

== Track list ==
Track list
No.	Title	Lyrics	Singer(s)	Length
1.	"Gaganapu Veedhi Veedhi"	Sri Mani	Vijay Prakash, M. L. R. Karthikeyan	4:42
2.	"Ninnu Chudagane"	Devi Sri Prasad	Devi Sri Prasad	5:27
3.	"Deva Devam"	Tallapaka Annamacharya, Ramajogayya Sastry	Palakkad Sreeram, M. S. Subbalakshmi, Rita	1:42
4.	"Bapu Gari Bommo"	Ramajogayya Sastry	Shankar Mahadevan	4:38
5.	"Kirraaku"	Ramajogayya Sastry	Narendra, David Simon	3:56
6.	"Its Time to Party"	Ramajogayya Sastry	David Simon, Malgudi Shubha	4:28
7.	"Kaatama Rayuda"	Samudrala Sr. / Yedla Ramadasu	Pawan Kalyan	1:11
Total length:				26:04

Kevvu Keka O Baabaaji

== Reception ==
The audio of the album received positive response. 123telugu.com gave a review stating "The audio album of Power Star Pawan Kalyan’s Atharintiki Dharedhi is a little different when compared to the usual tunes heard in Pawan’s films. In keeping with the unconventional title, the audio album is a lot more classy and subtle. There are no mass masala numbers. Bapu Gari Bomma, Aaradugula Bullet and Ninnu Chudagane are the best numbers from this album." IndiaGlitz gave a review stating "Attharintiki Daredi is easily the most awaited album of late. When DSP and Trivikram joined hands for Pawan Kalyan in 2008, it was nothing short of a sensation. Jalsa remains one of the best Telugu albums in the new century. Here is yet another dekko delivery, though not as eminently impressive as Jalsa, from the same team. A range of talented singers keep you hooked. Sree Mani and Rama Jogayya Sastry contributed some very interesting lines. But it is DSP's song that stands out." Telugu4.com gave a review stating "Overall The Songs are Superb. The music will rock the audience in the coming days. Awesomely composed by the young Music Director Devi Sri Prasad. Lyrics are super for all the songs." Cinema65.com gave a review stating "Finally What is say is..."Audio is Good.. But Not Reached My Expectations", Aradugula bullet song will be the Top track in the album which was written by new lyricist Sree Mani, DSP showed some Neglagence in composing songs for the hatrik film. When compared to Jalsa and Gabbar Singh these songs are not up to the Mark of Pawan Kalyan." Cinecorn.com gave a review stating "A mixed reaction arises which probably is the best thing that can be said for an album that comes with such humongous expectations. What this means is once the hype dies down the album will have a life of its own because the album is basically good. Lyrics play a major part in the album being good. Lyrics aren’t the award winning type, they are, to put it simply, very entertaining. Lastly if Gabbar Singh was a massy treat this is a classy treat." 143Cinema.com gave a review stating "Overall it a HIT album and the combo (Pawan Kalyan – Trivikram – DSP) never disappoints and fans get go crazy on Aaradugula, Kirrakke and its party time now. This is one of the DSP album you can’t skip."

== Awards and nominations ==
Ceremony	Category	Nominee	Result
61st Filmfare Awards South	Best Lyricist – Telugu	Sri Mani for "Aaradugula Bullet"	Won
61st Filmfare Awards South	Best Male Playback Singer – Telugu	Shankar Mahadevan for "Bapu Gari Bommo"	Nominated
61st Filmfare Awards South	Best Music Director – Telugu	Devi Sri Prasad	Won
3rd South Indian International Movie Awards	Best Music Director (Telugu)	Devi Sri Prasad	Won
3rd South Indian International Movie Awards	Best Male Playback Singer (Telugu)	Shankar Mahadevan for "Bapu Gari Bommo"	Nominated
3rd South Indian International Movie Awards	Best Lyricist (Telugu)	Sri Mani for "Aaradugula Bullet"	Nominated
TSR - TV9 National Film Awards	Best Music Director	Devi Sri Prasad	Won
TSR - TV9 National Film Awards	Best Playback Singer (Male)	Vijay Prakash for "Aaradugula Bullet"	Won
2013 Nandi Awards	Best Music Director	Devi Sri Prasad	Won
