= Dookudu (soundtrack) =

- Soundtrack album cover

Soundtrack album by S. Thaman
- Released: 19 August 2011
- Recorded: 2011
- Genre: Feature film soundtrack
- Length: 25:32
- Language: Telugu
- Label: Aditya Music
- Producer: S. Thaman

S. Thaman chronology
Kandireega (2011)	Dookudu (2011)	Osthe (2011)

Dookudu is the soundtrack to the 2011 film of the same name composed by S. Thaman with lyrics written by Ramajogayya Sastry, Viswa and Bhaskarabhatla Ravi Kumar. The film starring Mahesh Babu was directed by Srinu Vaitla. The six-song album was released by Aditya Music on 19 August 2011. The album was met with mixed response from critics, but fetched Thaman his maiden Filmfare Award for Best Music Director – Telugu.

== Background ==
The film marked Thaman's maiden collaboration with Babu and Vaitla; he also replaced the latter's usual music composer Devi Sri Prasad as he could not accommodate the dates for the project. The songs were recorded during March–July 2011. In mid-June 2011, Thaman planned to record two songs in China and one more song in Czech Republic during the re-recording as some special instruments were not available in India and were exclusively available there. Initially, Thaman composed the song "Champakamala" for the film, but as Vaitla required a "massy tune" for the romantic song, he composed "Dethadi Dethadi" instead while the former was used in Kandireega. The re-recording of the film began on 31 August 2011.

== Release ==
Aditya Music acquired the audio rights. The soundtrack was unveiled by hosting a promotional event at Shilpakala Vedika on 19 August 2011. The event was aired live on MAA TV and on the film's official website from 7:30 pm.

== Track listing ==
No.	Title	Lyrics	Singer(s)	Length
1.	"Nee Dookudu"	Viswa	Shankar Mahadevan	3:49
2.	"Guruvaram March Okati"	Ramajogayya Sastry	Rahul Nambiar	4:25
3.	"Chulbuli Chulbuli"	Ramajogayya Sastry	Karthik, Rita	4:26
4.	"Poovai Poovai"	Ramajogayya Sastry	Ramya NSK, Naveen Madhav	4:20
5.	"Dethadi Dethadi"	Bhaskarabhatla Ravi Kumar	Ranjith, Geetha Madhuri	4:11
6.	"Adara Adara"	Ramajogayya Sastry	Karthik, Koti, Ramajogayya Sastry, Vardhini, Ranina Reddy, Megha	4:21
Total length:				25:32

== Reception ==
The soundtrack was successful in its collections, but received mixed response from critics. Sify wrote "Thaman's music sounded average in the theatres, though a couple of numbers – 'Guruvaram' and 'Dethadi' – could enliven the mood of the spectators. The background score and the music during some romantic moments are dull." IndiaGlitz termed it the first passable album of Thaman and called it a forgettable one. Pavithra Srinivasan of Rediff.com felt that Thaman's score is "a lot of sound and fury" but only "Nee Dookudu" and "Guruvaram" "linger in one's memory for a while".

Contrarily, Suresh Kavirayani of The Times of India called the film's music impressive. A reviewer from IANS felt that "Nee Dookudu" and "Guruvaram" were well shot and composed while the overall music could have been better. Karthik Srinivasan of Milliblog said that Thaman "has figured how to catch our attention within commercial limits". Mahesh K. S. of 123Telugu called the album as an "all-round winner" and selected "Nee Dookudu", "Guruvaram", "Dethadi Dethadi" and "Poovai Poovai" as his picks; he further praised the picturization of the other songs, except for the item number "Poovai Poovai". Critic based at The New Indian Express wrote "Thaman’s music is justified with artistic picturization of songs, especially the title track, 'Dethadi Dethadi' and 'Poovai Poovai' [...] his background elevated most of the scenes when necessary." Regarding the trends in Telugu film music in the 2010s, Krishna Sripada of The Hindu mentioned the album having both "melodious" and "peppy" numbers.

== Accolades ==
Award	Date of ceremony (Note: Date is linked to the article about the awards held that year, wherever possible.)	Category	Recipients	Result	Ref.
Filmfare Awards South	7 July 2012	Best Music Director – Telugu	S. Thaman	Won	
Filmfare Awards South	7 July 2012	Best Male Playback Singer – Telugu	Rahul Nambiar (for the song "Guruvaram")	Won	
Filmfare Awards South	7 July 2012	Best Female Playback Singer – Telugu	Ramya NSK (for the song "Poovai Poovai")	Nominated	
Filmfare Awards South	7 July 2012	Best Lyricist – Telugu	Ramajogayya Sastry (for the song "Guruvaram")	Nominated	
Mirchi Music Awards South	4 August 2012	Best Album of the Year	S. Thaman	Won	
Mirchi Music Awards South	4 August 2012	Music Composer of the Year	S. Thaman	Nominated	
Mirchi Music Awards South	4 August 2012	Best Song of the Year	S. Thaman, Rahul Nambiar and Ramajogayya Sastry (for the song "Guruvaram")	Nominated	
Mirchi Music Awards South	4 August 2012	Male Vocalist of the Year	Rahul Nambiar (for the song "Guruvaram")	Nominated	
Mirchi Music Awards South	4 August 2012	Upcoming Female Vocalist of the Year	Ramya NSK (for the song "Poovai Poovai")	Won	
Mirchi Music Awards South	4 August 2012	Lyricist of the Year	Ramajogayya Sastry (for the song "Guruvaram")	Nominated	
Mirchi Music Awards South	4 August 2012	Technical – Sound Mixing of the Year	Chandu, Shadab Rayeen and Muralidhar (for the song "Guruvaram")	Nominated	
South Indian International Movie Awards	22 June 2012	Best Music Director (Telugu)	S. Thaman	Won	
South Indian International Movie Awards	22 June 2012	Best Male Playback Singer (Telugu)	Rahul Nambiar (for the song "Guruvaram")	Won	
South Indian International Movie Awards	22 June 2012	Best Lyricist (Telugu)	Ramajogayya Sastry (for the song "Guruvaram")	Won	
TSR–TV9 National Film Awards 2011	20 April 2013	Best Music Director	S. Thaman	Won	
TSR–TV9 National Film Awards 2011	20 April 2013	Best Playback Singer – Female	Ramya NSK (for the song "Poovai Poovai")	Won	
