= Tunak Tunak Tun =

Single by Daler Mehndi

from the album Tunak Tunak Tun
- Released: February 28, 1998
- Genre: Bhangra; Indi-pop
- Length: 4:16
- Label: Magnasound; Sony Music
- Songwriter: Daler Mehndi

Music video
- "Tunak Tunak Tun" on YouTube

"Tunak Tunak Tun" or simply "Tunak Tunak", is a Bhangra and Indi-pop song by Indian Punjabi artist Daler Mehndi, released in 1998. It was the first Indian music video made using chroma key technology.

The song and the video were a success in India, cementing Mehndi's status as India's biggest and most popular popstar at the time. It later gained international success and garnered a cult following, especially after it became an Internet meme in the 2000s.

== Background ==
The "Tunak Tunak Tun" lyrics are a reference to the sounds made by a tumbi (also called tumba), a traditional musical instrument from the Punjab region in the northern Indian subcontinent. The lyrics also refer to the ektara or tuntuna.

== Music video ==
Mehndi claims his music was often criticized for only being popular due to the abundance of beautiful, dancing women in his videos. The singer responded by creating a video that featured nobody but himself. The music video was the first made in India using bluescreen technology, which allowed the singer to superimpose his image over various computer-generated backgrounds including desert and mountain landscapes as well as St. Basil's Cathedral.

The music video was produced on a budget of ₹2.5 crore ($610,000), equivalent to ₹12 crore ($1.27 million) adjusted for inflation.

The music video follows a simple plot about four men, all played by Mehndi, who represent the four classical elements and dress in lavish Indian clothing. The earth Mehndi wears red/maroon, the fire Mehndi wears orange, the wind Mehndi wears brown, and the water Mehndi wears green. The Mehndis start off as comets made of water, earth, air, and fire before transforming into clothed Mehndis. Each of the Mehndis take turns singing, dancing and pointing at each other as though they are discussing something. The Mehndis later fuse by first reverting to their comet states and then merging to form one big Mehndi, who is predominantly clad in garb of gold and emerald.

As of 6 December 2024, the music video had received over 200 million views on the Sony Music India channel at YouTube, and is Mehndi's most viewed music video, but has been removed from the Sony Music India channel due to copyright issues from Mehndi.

== Reception and legacy ==
The song and the music video received a negative review from Rashtriya Sahara magazine in 1998. Despite this, the song became a notable commercial success in 1998, becoming the biggest Indi-pop hit at the time.

By 1999, the song found an international cult following, particularly among the South Asian diaspora in countries such as the United Kingdom and United States, as well as in Far-Eastern markets such as Japan. In China, it attained popularity for its lyrics, which sound like nonsensical words, gaining the song the Chinese name, "我在东北玩泥巴" ("I'm playing with mud in Northeastern China").

In the 2000s, "Tunak Tunak Tun" found greater international popularity on the internet as a viral video. In response, the video game company Blizzard Entertainment incorporated the "Tunak Tunak Tun" dance as a character animation in their multiplayer role-playing game World of Warcraft: The Burning Crusade in 2007. This dance is also included as an easter egg in the video game Medal of Honor: Allied Assault Spearhead.

== Chart performance ==
Chart performance for "Tunak Tunak Tun"
Chart (1998–2016)	Peak position
Belgium (Ultratop 50 Flanders)	28
India Hit Singles	1

== See also ==
- Ya Tabtab...Wa Dallaa, song with a similar backstory.
