= Peniviti =

2018 song by Kaala Bhairava

- Peniviti song cover featuring actors N. T. Rama Rao Jr. and Pooja Hegde

Single by Kaala Bhairava

from the album Aravinda Sametha Veera Raghava
- Language: Telugu
- Released: 19 September 2018 (lyrical); 22 December 2018 (full video)
- Recorded: 2018
- Studio: YRF, Mumbai; V, Chennai; Prasad Labs, Hyderabad
- Genre: Filmi; Indian pop; soft-rock
- Length: 5:10
- Label: Zee Music Company
- Composer: S. Thaman
- Lyricist: Ramajogayya Sastry
- Producer: S. Thaman

Kaala Bhairava singles chronology
"Oh Cheli" (2018)	"Peniviti" (2018)	"Guppeta" (2018)

Aravinda Sametha Veera Raghava track listing
- 4 tracks: 1. "Anaganaganaga"; 2. "Peniviti"; 3. "Yeda Poyinado"; 4. "Reddy Ikkada Soodu"

Music video
- "Peniviti" on YouTube

"Peniviti" is an Indian Telugu-language song by singer Kaala Bhairava and composed by S. Thaman from the 2018 soundtrack album Aravinda Sametha Veera Raghava of the film of the same name. The song is written Ramajogayya Sastry. The song's lyrical version was released on 19 September 2018, while the full video song was released on 22 December 2018 under the music label Zee Music Company.

== Music video ==
The music video features N. T. Rama Rao Jr. and Pooja Hegde. The music is choreographed by Raju Sundaram. The music video was uploaded on 22 December 2018 on YouTube, and had achieved lot of views due to its music and picturisation.

== Release ==
The teaser of the song was released on 6 October 2018. The lyrical was released on 19 September 2018 and the full video was released on 22 December 2018.

== Reception ==
=== Audience response ===
Kaala Bhairava, who sung the song received lots of praise for his work. Thaman also received appreciation.

=== Critical reviews ===
123Telugu on reviewing the music of the soundtrack wrote that "The soulful song is all about the tensions and problems that the wives go through when their husbands are away. What clicks with the song is the tune. Though its sound familiar, the rhythmic nature hits you instantly. Ram Jogayya Sastry’s lyrics touch your heart as this Thaman composition will leave its mark for years to come."

IndiaGlitz.com stated that "The lyrics are stuffed with strong meaning. 'Naa talaraatalo kalatalu raayku' takes the cake. The alliterative 'Taalibottu talusukoni tarali tarali raara penimitee' is a superb line. Thaman's sound is deliberately mellowed. Yet, it's intense. This one is a mood-based song and is difficult to be appreciated in its entirety outside the context of the movie. Kaala Bhairava's voice has the earnestness of a Kailash Kher when it comes to evoking pity as well as inspiring faith."

== Records ==
"Peniviti" is one of the most viewed song within 24 hours and became the 1st most viewed video song in the first 24 hours of its release. The song has many plays on many music-streaming services, especially on Amazon Prime Music, Gaana, JioSaavn, etc.

== Live performances ==
Kaala Bhairava and S. Thaman performed the song live together at H.I.C.C. Novotel Hotel in Hyderabad.

== Accolades ==
Ceremony	Category	Recipient(s)	Result	Ref.
8th South Indian International Movie Awards	Best Lyricist – Telugu	Ramajogayya Sastry	Nominated	
8th South Indian International Movie Awards	Best Male Playback Singer – Telugu	Kaala Bhairava	Nominated	
66th Filmfare Awards South	Best Lyricist – Telugu	Ramajogayya Sastry	Nominated	
66th Filmfare Awards South	Best Male Playback Singer – Telugu	Kaala Bhairava	Nominated	
2nd Radio City Cine Awards Telugu	Best Lyricist	Ramajogayya Sastry	Won	
2nd Radio City Cine Awards Telugu	Best Male Playback Singer	Kaala Bhairava	Nominated	
2nd Radio City Cine Awards Telugu	Best Song	"Penivitti"	Nominated	
