= Siva Shakthi Datta =

Indian lyricist and screenwriter (1932–2025)

K. Siva Shakthi Datta
- Born: Koduri Subba Rao; 8 October 1932; Kovvur, Madras Presidency, British India (present-day Andhra Pradesh, India)
- Died: 7 July 2025 (aged 92); Manikonda, Hyderabad, Telangana, India
- Occupations: Lyricist; Poet; Screenwriter; Painter
- Children: M. M. Keeravani; Kalyani Malik; Sivasri Kanchi
- Relatives: V. Vijayendra Prasad (brother); S. S. Rajamouli (nephew); See Koduri family

Koduri Siva Shakthi Datta (8 October 1932 – 7 July 2025) was an Indian lyricist, screenwriter and painter who worked in Telugu cinema. He was known for writing Sanskrit-based song lyrics in Telugu films. He was the elder brother of screenwriter V. Vijayendra Prasad, father of music director M. M. Keeravani and the uncle of director S. S. Rajamouli.

== Early life ==
Siva Shakthi Datta was born as Koduri Subbarao on 8 October 1932. His family hails from Kovvur near Rajahmundry in Andhra Pradesh. His father was Koduri Vijaya Apparao. Apparao was a landlord, a contractor and also ran a transport company in Kovvur with 12 buses. Apparao was fond of arts. His second son was Subbarao, who later changed his name to Baburao.

Subbarao was a dropout from intermediate at C. R. Reddy College in Eluru. Inclined towards arts from an early age, he ran away from his home and joined Sir J. J. School of Art in Mumbai. He graduated with a diploma two years later and returned to his native place Kovvur. He started using the pen name Kamalesh as a painter. Subbarao later changed his name to Siva Shakthi Datta. Datta was also interested in music and learned to play guitar, sitar and harmonium.

== Career ==
Datta's passion for films made him and Prasad shift to Madras. He assisted a couple of directors for some time and started a film titled Pillanagrovi which was stopped midway for financial reasons.

Later Prasad got introduced to K. Raghavendra Rao through Samatha Arts' Mukherjee who was a friend of his. Raghavendra Rao started giving Datta and Prasad small assignments. They got their first break with Janaki Ramudu (1988) which became successful at the box office.

Later, Datta wrote lyrics for various songs in films like Sye, Chatrapathi, Rajanna, Baahubali: The Beginning, Baahubali 2: The Conclusion, RRR, Hanu-Man.

== Personal life and death ==
Datta was the father of music director M. M. Keeravani. Datta had six siblings – an elder brother, an elder sister, and four younger brothers. His younger brother, the screenwriter V. Vijayendra Prasad credits him with his success. Datta was the uncle of director S. S. Rajamouli, and music composer M. M. Srilekha.

Datta died at his home in Hyderabad, on 7 July 2025, at the age of 92.

== Awards ==
IIFA Utsavam

- Nominated for Best Lyricist – Telugu for "Mamathala Thalli" from Baahubali: The Beginning.

== Filmography ==
=== As director ===
- Chandrahas (2007)

=== As screenwriter ===
- Janaki Ramudu (1988)

== Discography ==
=== As lyricist ===
| Year | Film | Song (s) | Ref. |
|---|---|---|---|
| 2004 | Sye | "Nalla Nallani Kalla" | |
| 2005 | Chatrapathi | "Agni Skalana, Mannela Thintivira" | |
| 2006 | Hanumanthu | "Matru Desa Vimuktikai" | |
| 2011 | Rajanna | "Amma Avani" | |
| 2012 | Shirdi Sai | "Amaraaraama", "Aarathi" | |
| 2015 | Baahubali: The Beginning | "Mamathala Thalli" " deevara " | |
| 2017 | Baahubali 2: The Conclusion | "Saahore Baahubali" | |
| 2017 | Srivalli | "Laali Laali" | |
| 2017 | Om Namo Venkatesaya | "Vayyari Kalahamsika" | |
| 2019 | NTR: Kathanayakudu | "Kathaanayaka" | |
| 2018 | Savyasachi | "Savyasachi" | |
| 2021 | Zombie Reddy | "Mrithyunjaya" | |
| 2021 | Pelli SandaD | "Hayam Vasishta" | |
| 2022 | RRR | "Ramam Raghavam" | |
| 2024 | Hanu-Man | "Anjandri Theme Song" | |
