= Baahubali 2: The Conclusion (soundtrack) =

2017 soundtrack album by M. M. Keeravani

- Telugu album cover

Soundtrack album by M. M. Keeravani
- Released: 26 March 2017
- Recorded: 2015
- Genre: Feature Film Soundtrack
- Length: 17:59
- Language: Telugu
- Labels: Lahari Music; T-Series
- Producer: M. M. Keeravani

M. M. Keeravani chronology
Om Namo Venkatesaya (2017)	Baahubali 2: The Conclusion (2017)	Juvva (2018)

Baahubali 2: The Conclusion is the soundtrack of the 2017 Indian Telugu film of the same name. The soundtrack album was composed by M. M. Keeravani.

== Production ==
The soundtrack in Telugu was composed by MM Keeravani while the songs were sung by Daler Mahendi, Mounima, Sony, Deepu, Sreenidhi, V. Srisoumya, Kaala Bhairava and Keeravani. In Tamil, Madhan Karky written the lyrics followed from part 1 of this film. Although the film was partially reshot in Tamil, no songs were reshot. For the dubbed Malayalam soundtrack, Mankompu Gopalakrishnan composed the lyrics while Vijay Yesudas, Shweta Mohan and Yazin Nizar sang the songs. The Hindi dubbed soundtrack featured a song by Kailash Kher.

Lahari Music and T-Series acquired the audio rights of the Telugu and Tamil soundtracks in late October 2016 for an amount of ₹45 million, the highest sum paid by the company in its 37 years of operation. The audio rights of the Hindi and Malayalam soundtracks were acquired by Zee Music Company and Manorama Music respectively. The audio launch of the soundtrack, which also doubled as the pre-release event of the film, was held on 26 March 2017 at YMCA grounds with Karan Johar as the chief guest. Among the various events that took place at the launch, Keeravani sang a song dedicated to S.S. Rajamouli, the director of the film. Due to the success of the predecessor's album, there were expectations that the second installment of the album would also be successful.

== Track listing ==
Telugu
No.	Title	Lyrics	Singer(s)	Length
1.	"Saahore Baahubali"	K. Shivashakthi Datta, Dr. K. Ramakrishna	Daler Mehndi, M. M. Keeravani, Mounima	3:22
2.	"Hamsa Naava"	Chaithanya Prasad	Sony, Deepu	3:23
3.	"Kannaa Nidurinchara"	M. M. Keeravani	T. Sreenidhi, V. Srisoumya	4:50
4.	"Dandaalayyaa"	M. M. Keeravani	Kaala Bhairava	3:29
5.	"Oka Praanam"	M. M. Keeravani	Kaala Bhairava	2:53
Total length:				17:57

All lyrics are written by Madhan Karky.

Tamil
No.	Title	Singer(s)	Length
1.	"Bale Bale Bale"	Daler Mehndi, M. M. Keeravani, Mounima	3:24
2.	"Orey Oar Ooril"	Mohana Bhogaraju, Deepu	3:26
3.	"Kanna Nee Thoongadaa"	Nayana Nair	4:52
4.	"Vandhaai Ayya"	Kaala Bhairava	3:32
5.	"Oru Yaagam"	Kaala Bhairava	2:56
Total length:			18:10

All lyrics are written by Manoj Muntashir.

Hindi
No.	Title	Singer(s)	Length
1.	"Jiyo Re Bahubali"	Daler Mehndi, Sanjeev Chimmalgi, Ramya Behara	3:29
2.	"Veeron Ke Veer Aa"	Aditi Paul, Deepu	3:27
3.	"Kanha Soja Zara"	Madhushree	4:56
4.	"Jay Jaykara"	Kailash Kher	3:31
5.	"Shivam"	Kaala Bhairava	2:56
Total length:			18:19

All lyrics are written by Mankombu Gopalakrishnan.

Malayalam
No.	Title	Singer(s)	Length
1.	"Bali Bali Bahubali"	Yazin Nizar, Vijay Yesudas, Shweta Mohan	3:22
2.	"Mukil Varna Mukunda"	Shweta Mohan	4:55
3.	"Arkum Tholkathe"	Madhu Balakrishnan	3:31
4.	"Ore Oru Raja"	Vijay Yesudas, Shweta Mohan	3:22
5.	"Oru Jeevan Bahuthayagam"	M. M. Keeravani	2:54
Total length:			18:04

== Background score ==
All music is composed and conducted by M.M. Keeravani.

Baahubali (Original Soundtrack) - Volume 1
No.	Title	Length
1.	"Mahendra Baahubali Must Live"	2:55
2.	"The Mask and The Soldier"	2:07
3.	"Tattoo"	1:35
4.	"Bhalla and Bison"	1:11
5.	"Volcanic Words"	2:35
6.	"Man and Woman"	3:20

Baahubali (Original Soundtrack) - Volume 2
No.	Title	Length
1.	"Mahishmathi.. Brace Yourself"	2:27
2.	"Undying Glory"	2:54
3.	"Rage 1"	3:39
4.	"Rage 2"	4:15
5.	"The King and His Sword"	3:59

Baahubali (Original Soundtrack) - Volume 3
No.	Title	Length
1.	"Baahubali - The Story"	2:02
2.	"Sivagami"	0:37
3.	"True Colours"	1:58
4.	"Kaalakeyas"	1:01
5.	"Old Tools New Plan"	2:04
6.	"Wkkb"	4:30

Baahubali (Original Soundtrack) - Volume 4
No.	Title	Length
1.	"Agni Prasthham"	0:58
2.	"The Saviour"	1:13
3.	"Poison"	1:18
4.	"Sniffer Dog"	1:05
5.	"The Tour"	1:34
6.	"Compensation"	0:40

Baahubali (Original Soundtrack) - Volume 5
No.	Title	Length
1.	"Devasena"	1:33
2.	"Kunthala"	1:22
3.	"Lust"	0:50
4.	"Killer Beauty"	0:35
5.	"Wrong Path"	0:58
6.	"Word Against Sword"	1:37

Baahubali (Original Soundtrack) - Volume 6
No.	Title	Length
1.	"Love At First Fight"	1:52
2.	"Master Plan"	1:58
3.	"He Is The Man"	1:32
4.	"Revealed Identity"	1:14
5.	"Royal Love"	1:01

Baahubali (Original Soundtrack) - Volume 7
No.	Title	Length
1.	"Enter Mahishmathi"	1:23
2.	"The Court"	4:21
3.	"Greatest Honour"	0:25
4.	"My Wish Is Your Priority"	1:29

Baahubali (Original Soundtrack) - Volume 8
No.	Title	Length
1.	"Please Leave Me"	2:16
2.	"Trap"	2:04
3.	"Stoned Heart"	1:01
4.	"Confession"	1:37

Baahubali (Original Soundtrack) - Volume 9
No.	Title	Length
1.	"Lullaby Of Death"	2:20
2.	"Can You Ever Forgive Me?"	0:58
3.	"Birth Of An Avenger"	3:56

Baahubali (Original Soundtrack) - Volume 10
No.	Title	Length
1.	"Message From Forgotten Past"	2:12
2.	"Hatha Praveera"	0:38
3.	"We Can't Afford To Lose"	0:47
4.	"Think Like Baahubali"	1:23
5.	"Sa Ho !"	0:57
6.	"Constitutional Advice"	1:04
7.	"War And Passion"	1:04
8.	"My Faith My Mentor"	6:31

== Critical reception ==
The Conclusion received positive reviews. Hemanth Kumar of Firstpost writes, "It wouldn't be an exaggeration to say that every song in the album is infused with so much emotion, pain and love that it's tough to handpick the best of the lot." Further commenting on the theme, he writes, "One of the key aspects of the album is that each song is tied to a very particular situation in the film and it's unfair to alienate the song from what it tries to convey." Bollywood Life rates the soundtrack 3.5/5 and writes, "Just as expected, MM Keeravani provides a majestic score for Baahubali 2, that suitably fits its grandeur and epicness." India-West gives a rating of 3.5/5 and comments that the songs doesn't have the "instant appeal" and "lasting quality" of the songs in The Beginning but writes, "Overall, this is a better than the good score that will in all probability be perfect for the film." Vikram Venkateswaran of BloombergQuint claims that the songs are "infinitely better" than that of The Beginning and writes, "In keeping with the theme of the movie, the songs are simple, yet grand. The arrangement is devoid of unnecessary frills." Prachi Kulkarni of India writes, "The audio juke box... will make you feel the wholeness of the film way before you see it on the silver screen." Apoorva Nijhara of Pink Villa gave it a rating of 85/100 and writes, "From the setting of the musical arrangements to the singers, everything is just perfect."
