= Chandrahas (film) =

- Poster
- Directed by: Siva Shakthi Datta
- Written by: Siva Shakthi Datta
- Produced by: Haranath Policherla
- Starring: Haranath Policherla
- Music by: M. M. Keeravani
- Production company: PH Productions
- Release date: 22 June 2007
- Country: India
- Language: Telugu

Chandrahas is a 2007 Indian Telugu-language social drama film directed by Siva Shakthi Datta and starring Haranath Policherla with Abbas and Ravi Prakash in supporting roles. Krishna makes a special appearance as Chatrapati Sivaji.

== Plot ==
Five-hundred years ago, a Mysore queen gifted Chatrapati Sivaji (Krishna) a sword called Chandrahas. At present day, Sivaji (Harinath Policherla), a fifteen generation descendant of Sivaji and an archeologist, finds the sword but gets himself in trouble with his Muslim family friends and terrorists.

== Cast ==
- Haranath Policherla as Sivaji
- Astha Singal
- Abbas as Firoj
- Ravi Prakash as Sohail
- Sarath Babu as Chatrapati
- Hariprasad as Gaffar
- Puneet Issar as Liaqat Ali Khan
- Satya Prakash as Asad
- Brahmanandam
- Venu Madhav
- Gundu Hanumantha Rao
- Rajyalakshmi
- Sana
- Sujatha
- Abhinayashree
- Krishna as Chatrapati Sivaji (special appearance)

== Production ==
Siva Shakthi Datta, M. M. Keeravani's father, made his debut into direction with this film. Haranath Policherla, producer of films like Paris Pranaya (2003; Kannada), Premayanamaha (2003), Alex (2005; also lead actor) and Hope (2006), plays the lead role in the film in addition to producing the film. The director had scene a still from Doctor Cine Actor (1982) in which Krishna did a cameo as Chatrapati Sivaji and asked him to do the same role in this film. Abbas plays the role of an emotional Muslim.

== Soundtrack ==
The music was composed by M. M. Keeravani. Datta wrote the lyrics for eight songs, one of which was in Hindi. The audio launch was held on 24 April 2007 at Prasad Labs in Hyderabad. One song features Krishna.

Chandrahas

Soundtrack album by M. M. Keeravani
- Released: 2007
- Genre: Feature film soundtrack
- Length: 37:40
- Language: Telugu
- Producer: M. M. Keeravani

M. M. Keeravani chronology
Bhookailas (2007)	Chandrahas (2007)	Yamadonga (2007)
External audio
- Chandrahas – Jukebox on YouTube

Track listing
No.	Title	Singer(s)	Length
1.	"Aa Gale Lagja"		2:33
2.	"Aa Gale Lagja 2"		5:41
3.	"Chattisgadh Ki Ladki"		4:21
4.	"Chura Chura Choopula"		3:50
5.	"Hatathhuga"		1:16
6.	"Hrudayamadhuvanilo"	Vijay Yesudas	4:37
7.	"Idhi Tiyyani Teerani"		9:36
8.	"Naattuvangam"		2:12
9.	"Theme Music"		0:58
10.	"Trubuvana Janani"		2:36
Total length:			37:40

== Release and reception ==
The film was initially scheduled to release on 6 April 2007.

Jeevi of Idlebrain.com wrote that "It is a badly made film with good music".

== Awards ==
Nandi Awards

- Sarojini Devi Award for a Film on National Integration
