= Jawahar Wattal =

Indian composer

- Origin: India
- Occupation: Composer

Jawahar Wattal is an Indian cultural entrepreneur, music director and producer, best known for being a pioneer in the Indian non-filmi music field and for shifting the focus of the industry to Delhi. He has worked with singers Baba Sehgal and Daler Mehndi in the 1990s. Over the years he has composed 3,000 jingles, given music for television series like, The World This Week, Himalaya Darshan and Ru Ba Ru, besides he has composed 73 music albums out of which 19 have gone multi-platinum.

He was awarded one of India's highest civilian honours, the Padma Shri in 2008.

== Early life and background ==
Wattal grew up in Delhi, where his passion for music led him to train in classical and instrumental Western music as a teenager and to play the guitar. By the age of 21, he had already composed and sung numerous advertising jingles and performed for leading professional record labels like EMI India. The dream culminated in his setting up a multi-track digitalised production house and an accredited advertising agency by the time he was 21. This Production House was the first of its kind in India's capital.

== Major projects ==
Advertisements: Wattal has directed and produced more than 3,000 commercials. They include: Ponds, Pepsi, Hero Honda, KLM, Usha Fans, Boost, Horlicks, Lufthansa, Maggi, Nescafé and Mirinda.

Brand Promotion: He has been actively engaged in brand promotions and execution of various product launches, with experience in the field of software production for multimedia applications. Additionally, he has been involved in the export of entertainment software to various countries across the world including the USA. Instrumental in corporate image building and promotions for public and private sector companies, his clients include: public sector organisations, BHEL, MMTC and STC to name a few.

Public Service Announcements: Producer of public service announcements (PSAs) on social issues – ranging from primary health care, education to sanitation and more for UNICEF. Producer, First Earth Run event, a joint production for the United Nations.

Theater: For many years, he has been actively involved in theatre productions for private and government entities. One of his hit productions – 'Yeh Hai Mumbai Meri Jaan' premiered in the UK

Tele-Serials: Wattal has scored musical compositions for tele-serials such as: 'Tol Mol Ke Bol,' 'Himalaya Darshan,' 'Newsline, ' S'anjha Choolah,' 'Ruba Ru,' 'Saas Pe Sawa Saas,' 'Quiz Time.' He has also scored for musicals like 'Mira' and telefilms such as 'Kanjoos Makhichoos.'

In-flight music: He was an early pioneer in creating in-flight music with compositions for Indian Airlines.

Live Recordings: Known for his live recordings, he has recorded with artists including: Pt Ravi Shankar and his orchestra for the Festival of France in India, Pt Hariprasad Chaurasia, Pt Bhim Sen Joshi, Pt Birju Maharaj, Pt Kelucharan Mahapatra, Ut Amjad Ali Khan and Pt Shiv Kumar Sharma among others.

Original Albums: Wattal has composed, directed and produced 73 albums in a span of six years out of which, fifteen went platinum. These have included everything from Punjabi Bhangra, Rajasthani folk, Christmas carols, Sufiana repertoire and ghazals, to a pop album in Tamil. As a result, some of today's best-known Indi-pop superstars like Baba Sehgal, Daler Mehndi, Shweta Shetty, Hans Raj Hans and Shubha Mudgal, to name a few, were launched.

== Top-selling albums ==
- "Dilruba"
- "Bolo Tara Ra Ra"
- "Dardi Rab Rab"
- "Ho Jayegi Balle Balle"
- "Ali More Angana"
- "Deewane To Deewane Hain"
- "Jogiya Khalli Balli"
- "Mahi O Mahi"
- "Jhanjhar"
- "Piya Se Milke Aaye Nain"
- "Punjabi Munda"
- "Mera Dil Bole Piya Piya"
- "Wallah Wallah"
- "Yaari Yaari"
- "Haule Haule"
- "Naag Ishq Da Laddya"
- "Sajnaa"
- "Jalsa (Re-Mix)"
- "Paaro"
- "Deadly Dance Mix" – P. K. Srivastav
- "Hari Om" – Alok Sehdev
- "Majajane" – BabuChalla Lakhwinder Lucky
- "Ankhiya"n – Susheel Baba
- "Jat Luteya Gaya" – Ravinder Ravi
- "Chane Ke Khet Mein" – Gauri Saksena
- "Rang Dey" – Arjun
- "Shri Amarnath Ji Ki Yatra" – Suresh Wadekar
- "Sharana" – S.P.Balasubramaniam, K K, Suresh Wadekar, Vinod Rathod

== Film music ==
- "Silence Please… The Dressing Room"

== Business development ==
- 1984 Created Adcamp : Advertising Agency
- 1985 Established A State-Of-The-Art Music Production Facility
- 1989 Established A Music Software Export Division
- 1995–1998 Consultant: Marketing, Artistes & Repertoire, Magnasound / Warner Brothers
- 1998–1999 Consultant: Marketing, Artistes & Repertoire, Archies Greetings & Gifts Ltd.
- 1999–2001 Consultant: Marketing, Artistes & Repertoire, Tips Ltd.
- 2001–2003 Consultant: Marketing, Artistes & Repertoire, Lucky Star Entertainment Ltd
- Jan 2002 Partnered With Dainik Jagran For A Half Page Editorial On Music Entitled ‘Jalsa Ghar’
- Mar 2002 Partnered With Sunday Tribune For An Exclusive Column Entitled ‘Half Note’
- August 2005 Established Blessings Media Pvt Ltd
- August 2007 Partnered With Zeyba Rahman – President, World Music Institute and Harmonia Mundi, New York for an international production entitled ‘Divine Inspiration’.
- August 2008 Global Adviser-Advertising, Content Entertainment- SPICE GLOBAL.
- December 2009– Consultant Ministry of Information and Broadcasting, Govt Of India.
- 2011– Member working group on Information and Broadcasring Sector for 12th-five year plan-2012-2017.
- 2011-Member steering committee for International Film Festival
- 2012– Director- board of directors National Film Development Corporation Ltd.

== International releases ==
- "Divine Inspiration" – Aruna Sairam

== Major awards ==
- 2008 National Award: Padmashri
- 2000 Sangeet Samrat Award: the Press Club of Punjab
- 2000 Multi-platinum Award: Mera Dil Bole Piya Piya
- 1999 Multi-platinum Award: Mahi O Mahi
- 1999 Multi-platinum Award: Punjabi Munda
- 1999 Multi-platinum Award: Piya Se Milke Aaye Nain
- 1999 Multi-platinum Award: Jhanjhar
- 1998 Channel V Award: Best Music Composer
- 1998 Multi-platinum Award: Ho Jayegi Balle Balle
- 1997 Multi-platinum Award: Deewane to Deewane Hain
- 1996 Multi-platinum Award: Ali More Angana
- 1996 Multi-platinum Award: Dardi Rab Rab
- 1995 Multi-platinum Award: Bolo Ta Ra Ra
