= Chhodon Naa Yaar =

2007 Hindi film

- DVD Cover
- Directed by: Dilip Sood
- Written by: Veena Advani; Sanjay Pawar
- Starring: Jimmy Sheirgill; Kim Sharma; Farid Amiri; Ahmed Khan; Vinod Nagpal
- Music by: Anand Raj Anand (songs); Ranjit Barot (score)
- Release date: 5 October 2007
- Running time: 97 minutes
- Country: India
- Language: Hindi
- Budget: ₹ 3.25 crore
- Box office: ₹ 0.26 crore

Chhodon Naa Yaar (transl. Let it go, friend) is a 2007 Indian Hindi-language supernatural horror film directed by Dilip Sood. Starring Jimmy Sheirgill and Kim Sharma, it is an adaptation of the 1999 American found footage horror film The Blair Witch Project. It opened theatrically on 5 October 2007 and bombed at the box office.

== Plot ==
Ravi (Jimmy Sheirgill), Shiv (Kabir Sadanand), and Sunny (Farid Amiri), three final-year students from a Delhi Mass Com College, decided to make their diploma film about a myth that was prevalent in the northern hills of India. But they did not know that the myth would turn out to be the truth.

Ravi planned the trip against the wishes of his girlfriend Rashmi (Kim Sharma) and college professor Saxena (Ahmed Khan), as both of them thought it to be a dangerous trip. However, Sunny eagerly joined the trip, considering it a fun trip. It was surely fun when they began, but as they got deeper into the jungle, their courage and beliefs were put to the test.

== Cast ==
- Kim Sharma as Rashmi
- Jimmy Sheirgill as Ravi Prasad
- Farid Amiri as Sunny
- Kabir Sadanand as Shiv Kapoor
- Ahmed Khan as Saxena
- Sri Vallabh Vyas
- Vinod Nagpal
- Mahek Chahal

== Soundtrack ==
The album was composed by Anand Raj Anand. The lyrics were wrriten by Panchi Jalonvi and Anand. It has 9 tracks.

- 1. Talwar Re - Daler Mehndi, Sunidhi Chauhan
- 2. Talwar Re (Dhol Mix) - Daler Mehndi, Sunidhi Chauhan
- 3 Talwar Re (Remix) - Daler Mehndi, Anand Raj Anand, Sunidhi Chauhan
- 4. Kasak - Anand Raj Anand
- 5. Jhoom Le - Sunidhi Chauhan
- 6. Zindagi - Shaan
- 7. Chhodon Naa Yaar - Sharib Sabri, Ujjaini Mukherjee
- 8. Luta Hai Zamana Ne - Sukhwinder Singh
- 9. Chhodon Naa Yaar (Remix) - Anand Raj Anand

Joginder Tuteja from Bollywood Hungama gave the soundtrack 2 stars out of 5, praising Talwar Re and Kasak while finding the rest not good enough to make the album a must buy.

== Reception ==
Khalid Mohamed from Hindustan Times gave the film 1.5 stars out of 5, labeling it Himachal Pradeshi Blair Witch, telling the readers to "forget about it, sit at home and watch the ceiling fan whirr or the alley cat purr." Taran Adarsh from Bollywood Hungama gave the film 1 star out of 5, remarking that the film was letdown by its writing. He also felt the songs were unnecessary, while praising the technical aspects, background score and Sheirgill's performance.
