= Businessman (soundtrack) =

Soundtrack album by S. Thaman
- Released: 21 December 2011
- Recorded: 2011
- Genre: Film soundtrack
- Length: 21:15
- Language: Telugu
- Label: Aditya Music
- Producer: S. Thaman

S. Thaman chronology
Bodyguard (2011)	Businessman (2011)	Nippu (2011)

Businessman is the feature film soundtrack of the 2012 crime-action film of the same name starring Mahesh Babu and Kajal Aggarwal. Directed by Puri Jagannadh, the film's music and background score was composed by S. Thaman marking his first collaboration with Jagannadh and Thaman's second collaboration with Mahesh Babu after Dookudu (2011). The official soundtrack album consists of 6 songs composed by S. Thaman and Bhaskarabhatla Ravi Kumar penning the lyrics. Being recorded in 2011, the film's soundtrack album was launched on 21 December 2011 in a grand promotional event at Shilpakala Vedika, Hyderabad on Aditya Music label.

The audio received a positive response from both critics and audience alike. Musicperk.com, a famous music website rated Businessman as one of the best albums of the year 2012, rating it 9/10.

== Production ==
After the success of his previous film Dookudu, Thaman was roped in to compose the music to recreate the success again, marking Puri Jagan's first collaboration with Thaman. Thaman too described the film's music as "commercial cocktail" in an interview to The Times of India. Bhaskarabhatla Ravikumar, who generally pens lyrics for many of Puri Jagan's films was roped in to pen the lyrics to this film too. The singers of the album include Haricharan, Priya Hemesh, Geetha Madhuri, Rahul Nambiar and others. Mahesh Babu himself sang the theme song along with director Puri Jagannadh in all three languages – Telugu, Tamil and Malayalam. Generally, Puri Jagan's films were famous for their item songs thus raising many speculations regarding the item song in the film. Thus, in October 2011, It was reported that Thaman finished composing an item song for the film. Initially, Hansika Motwani was reported to be roped in to dance for that item song. However, after returning from the US, Hansika rubbished these reports. Finally Shweta Bhardwaj was roped in to perform the item number in the film.

== Release ==
The Promotional event of Launch of the Soundtrack Album was held at Shilpakala Vedika in Hyderabad on 21 December 2011. The music was launched in Telugu, Tamil and Malayalam languages on the same dais. While the Telugu audio CDs were released by Srinu Vytla, the Tamil version was released by Mahesh Babu's parents Krishna and Vijaya Nirmala, the Malayalam version was released by S. S. Rajamouli, Atchi Reddy and Charmi. The ‘Businessman’ memory card was released by Mahesh Babu. The others who attended the audio function were D. Ramanaidu, Mahesh's wife and actress Namrata Shirodkar, Kajal Aggarwal, Rama Rajamouli, Dil Raju, Kajal's sister and actress Nisha Agarwal, S. Thaman, Nassar, Bhaskarabhatla Ravikumar, Anil Sunkara, Ram Achanta, Ramesh Puppala and others. The television broadcasting rights were acquired by Telugu channels NTV and Gemini TV for a disclosed price.

== Track listing ==
All lyrics are written by Bhaskarabhatla Ravi Kumar.

Telugu
No.	Title	Singer(s)	Length
1.	"Aamchi Mumbai"	Ranjith, Rahul Nambiar, Aalap Raju, Naveen Madhav	2:43
2.	"Sir Osthara"	Suchitra, S. Thaman	3:57
3.	"Pilla Chao"	Rahul Nambiar	4:19
4.	"Chandamama"	Haricharan	3:04
5.	"Bad Boys"	Geetha Madhuri, Priya Himesh	3:53
6.	"Theme Music (Bhaag Saale)"	Puri Jagannadh, Mahesh Babu (Vocals) & Chorus	3:52
Total length:			20:28

All lyrics are written by Na. Muthukumar and Jaimurasu.

Tamil
No.	Title	Singer(s)	Length
1.	"Katakulla Mumbai"	Ranjith, Rahul Nambiar, Aalap Raju, Naveen Madhav,	2:38
2.	"Sir Udanay"	Suchitra, S. Thaman	3:52
3.	"Penne Savudi"	Rahul Nambiar	4:13
4.	"Chandamama Nilavaye"	Haricharan	3:00
5.	"We Love Bad Boyz"	Geetha Madhuri, Priya Himesh	3:48
Total length:			17:31

All lyrics are written by Kailash Rishi.

Malayalam
No.	Title	Singer(s)	Length
1.	"Aaj Mumbai"	Ranjith, Rahul Nambiar, Aalap Raju, Naveen Madhav	2:38
2.	"Sir Onnu"	Suchitra, S. Thaman	3:52
3.	"Penne Savu"	Rahul Nambiar	4:14
4.	"Chandamama Nadakum"	Haricharan	2:59
5.	"We Wanna Bad Boyz"	Geetha Madhuri, Priya Himesh	3:48
Total length:			17:31

All lyrics are written by Nawab Arzoo.

Hindi
No.	Title	Length
1.	"Ye Shehar Hai Dilwalon Ka"	2:43
2.	"Rafta Rafta Dil Gaya"	3:57
3.	"Bad Boys"	3:53

== Reception ==
The album was a huge hit with nearly 0.2 Million CD's sold out on the first day of the release itself. The audio received positive reviews. Musicperk.com gave a review stating "Thaman has done great justice to this high profile movie by delivering the goods in the music section. Sir Osthara is the pick of the album while the other songs aren’t too far behind" and rated the album 9/10. 123Telugu gave a review stating "The audio album of Businessman has some pretty solid numbers and care has been taken to make this album appeal to a wide section of the audience. There is something in it for everyone. Sir Osthara and Pilla Chao are terrific numbers that will top the charts. Aamchi Mumbai and Bad Boys have good energy levels and will catch on well with the public. While there is nothing new or extraordinary from Thaman, he makes sure that he delivers what is required. You can safely go for this album. It is enjoyable." Oneindia Entertainment gave a review stating "The Businessman is a wonderful album, which lacks variety. Yet, it impresses the audience with its energetic tracks, which is targeted at the mass and youths. 'Sir osthara...', 'Bad boyz...' and 'Aamchi Mumbai...' are our picks." IndiaGlitz gave a review stating "The Businessman, it should be said at the outset, belies our expectations. Nevertheless, the six songs (including the theme song) are worth a listen for the thrum of energy passing through the numbers. Thaman doesn't give us a Champakamala or a Chulbuli. It may disappoint you a bit, but you may see a glimmer at the end of the tunnel (in their picturization on the celluloid)." greatandhra.com gave a review stating "It is never an easy task when a music director is delivering nearly six out of ten films that are arriving and that too top league big budget flicks. However, Thaman has taken the challenge and has been proving his mettle with each passing movie. Here again, he has maintained the same energy in his composition and also with the right kind of beats and pace. Overall, this is an album which rocks and youth will love it." way2movies.com gave a review stating "All in all, Thaman has impressed the audiences with Businessman by delivering few energetic tracks that goes well with larger sections. Sir Osthara has turned out to be instant hit while Aamchi Mumbai and the theme song too are catchy. All the singers’ have done a great job while Bhaskarbhatla’s lyrics are impressive. Enjoy Businessman songs folks." Cinecorn.com gave a review stating "Barring few songs that provide an instant satisfaction nothing sticks in mind once we stop playing the album."

== Controversy ==
The soundtrack album had to face heavy controversies regarding copying of tunes and offensive lyrics. "Pilla Chao" was alleged to be a straight lift from the techno mix of the legendary Italian World War II song "Bella ciao". In an Interview to the press before release of the film, Puri Jagannath and Thaman responded to the issue. Puri Jagannath spoke "Yes. It is inspired from an old Italian song and I don’t see what is the problem with it. We have been inspired by many foreign things. Have we invented the movie camera with which we are shooting? Are we not using it. Similarly, since the very beginning, we have been using a lot of foreign things in our movies. No point in making an issue out of it." Later, "Chandamama" was alleged to be copied from "He Lives in You", a song written and performed by Lebo M and his South African Choir for the CD Rhythm of the Pride Lands whose shorter version of the song was used in the opening of The Lion King II: Simba's Pride. After the release of the film, it landed in a controversy with the Bajrang Dal lodging a police complaint that one of the songs in the film contained vulgar words and conveyed unacceptable meaning. In his complaint to the Mahankali police, Dal city unit's representative Murali alleged that the song in question, "Bad Boys", was written with vulgar words and demanded action against the film's director, Puri Jagannath, for screening such a vulgar song for public viewing at cinema houses. Police inspector S Ranga Rao confirmed that they received a complaint from the Bajrang Dal's representative. "We will take necessary action against the director after consulting legal experts," he said.

== Awards and nominations ==
Ceremony	Category	Nominee	Result
2nd South Indian International Movie Awards	Best Music Director	S.S. Thaman	Nominated
2nd South Indian International Movie Awards	Best Lyricist	Bhaskarabhatla Ravikumar for "Sir Osthara"	Won
2nd South Indian International Movie Awards	Best Male Playback Singer	S.S. Thaman for "Sir Osthara"	Won
2nd South Indian International Movie Awards	Best Female Playback Singer	Suchitra for "Sir Osthara"	Nominated
60th Filmfare Awards South	Best Music Director	S.S. Thaman	Nominated
60th Filmfare Awards South	Best Playback Female Singer (Female)	Suchitra – "Sir Osthara"	Won
Santosham Film Awards 2013	Best Lyricist	Bhaskarabhatla	Won
Santosham Film Awards 2013	Radio City Listeners Choice	Suchitra – "Sir Osthara"	Won
