= Seethamma Vakitlo Sirimalle Chettu (soundtrack) =

Soundtrack album by Mickey J Meyer
- Released: 7 December 2012
- Recorded: 2012
- Genre: Feature film soundtrack
- Length: 27:29
- Language: Telugu
- Label: Aditya Music
- Producer: Mickey J Meyer

Mickey J Meyer chronology
Routine Love Story (2012)	Seethamma Vakitlo Sirimalle Chettu (2012)	Chandamama Kathalu (2014)

Seethamma Vakitlo Sirimalle Chettu is the feature film soundtrack of the 2013 family-drama film of the same name starring Venkatesh, Mahesh Babu, Anjali and Samantha Ruth Prabhu. Directed by Srikanth Addala, the film's music was composed by Mickey J Meyer, marking his second collaboration with Srikanth Addala. Mani Sharma provided the re-recording and background score for the film, while Anantha Sreeram and Sirivennela Sitaramasastri composed the lyrics for the songs in the album. Its release coincided with a promotional launch function on 7 December 2012 at Ramanaidu Studios in Nanakramguda in Hyderabad under the Aditya Music label.

== Production ==
Srikanth Addala selected Mickey J Meyer to compose the music for this film marking his second collaboration with him after Kotha Bangaru Lokam in 2008. The audio rights of the film were sold to Aditya Music in June 2012. A preview of the title song was released on 31 May 2012.

On 15 November 2012 the song Inka Cheppale was filmed on Mahesh Babu and Samantha at Magarpatta in Pune. The last song Vaana Chinukulu was filmed from 25 November, lasting for three days on Venkatesh and Anjali in Kerala. While shooting commenced, a thirty seconds promo of "Aaraduguluntada" song was released through Red FM 93.5 on 26 November 2012.

All seven promo songs were released on the official Aditya Music Facebook page on 1 December 2012. The launch of the film was held at Ramanaidu Studios in Nanakramguda, Hyderabad on 7 December 2012, with the official soundtrack released on the same day. The triple platinum disc function of the film was held on 19 January 2013 at Shilpakala Vedika, Hyderabad to which the whole unit attended amidst high fanfare.

== Tracklist ==
No.	Title	Lyrics	Singer(s)	Length
1.	"Yem Cheddaam"	Sirivennela Seetharama Sastry	Ranjith, Karthik, Sreerama Chandra	4:28
2.	"Aaraduguluntada"	Ananta Sriram	Kalyani	4:26
3.	"Seethamma Vakitlo"	Ananta Sriram	Chitra, Chorus	3:43
4.	"Inka Cheppale"	Ananta Sriram	Rahul Nambiar, Swetha Pandit
5.	"Mari Anthaga"	Sirivennela Seetharama Sastry	Sreerama Chandra	3:48
6.	"Vaana Chinukulu"	Ananta Sriram	Karthik, Anjana Sowmya	3:45
7.	"Meghaallo"	Sirivennela Seetharama Sastry	Karthik, Sreerama Chandra	3:57
Total length:				27:29
