= S/O Satyamurthy (soundtrack) =

Soundtrack album by Devi Sri Prasad
- Released: 21 March 2015
- Recorded: 2014–2015
- Genre: Feature film soundtrack
- Length: 26:43
- Language: Telugu
- Label: Aditya Music
- Producer: Devi Sri Prasad

Devi Sri Prasad chronology
Alludu Seenu (2014)	S/O Satyamurthy (2015)	Srimanthudu (2015)
External audio
- Audio Jukebox on YouTube

S/O Satyamurthy is the soundtrack album composed by Devi Sri Prasad for the 2015 Indian Telugu-language film of the same name, directed by Trivikram Srinivas. The film stars Allu Arjun, Samantha Ruth Prabhu, Nithya Menen and Adah Sharma in the lead roles. Devi Sri Prasad has also composed the background score for the film. The album consists of seven songs in Telugu, with Sri Mani, Devi Sri Prasad, Sirivennela Seetharama Sastry and Ramajogayya Sastry penning the lyrics. "Super Machi" is the most popular track among the all. For the soundtrack album, Devi received two awards, out of five nominations.

== Production and release ==
Trivikram's regular collaborator, Devi Sri Prasad, was hired for the music compositions. Folk singer Raghu Dixit made his Telugu cinema debut as a playback singer, saying on 4 February 2015 that he had recorded a song for the film. The soundtrack was scheduled to be released on 18 March, with Pawan Kalyan and Mahesh Babu the expected guests of honour at the release party. In late February 2015, Prasad wrote and recorded a song. Aditya Music acquired the soundtrack's marketing rights, and the seven-track list was released on 20 March 2015. The complete album was released the following day, on 21 March 2015, coinciding with the Ugadi celebrations, on the H. I. C. C. Novotel Hotel in Hyderabad. Kannada tracks of the film were released in 2020, including soundtrack album under Aditya Music label.

== Track listing ==
Telugu
No.	Title	Lyrics	Artist(s)	Length
1.	"One & Two & Three"	Devi Sri Prasad	Sooraj Santhosh	2:08
2.	"Seethakalam"	Sri Mani	Yazin Nizar	4:24
3.	"Super Machi"	Devi Sri Prasad	Devi Sri Prasad, Sravana Bhargavi, Magizhini Manimaaran	4:40
4.	"Come to the Party"	Sirivennela Sitaramasastri	Vijay Prakash	4:02
5.	"Jaaruko"	Sri Mani	Sagar, M. M. Manasi	4:23
6.	"Chal Chalo Chalo"	Ramajogayya Sastry	Raghu Dixit, Sooraj Santhosh, Rita	5:10
7.	"Vachchaadu"	Devi Sri Prasad	Javed Ali	2:36
Total length:				26:43

Kannada
No.	Title	Lyrics	Artist(s)	Length
2.	"Seethakala"	Chetan	Danunjay	4:24
3.	"Super Machi"	Lokesh	Geetha Madhuri, Vinayak	4:40
4.	"Cocktail Kudidaga"	Chetan	Sai Charan	4:02
5.	"Pennu Paper"	Venu Gopal Krishna	Geetha Madhuri, Venky, Pavani	4:23
6.	"Rajya Gedhonu"	Lokesh	Vinayak	5:10

== Reception ==
The soundtrack's success was celebrated on 6 April 2015 at Haailand, Vijayawada.

=== Critical reception ===
Jeevi of Idlebrain.com praised Devi's background score composition. News18 too lauded Devi's work for the album.

A critic of The Times of India wrote that "On the whole, the songs in the album are passable. It does have the trademark style of Devi Sri Prasad, although he doesn't hit the ball out of the park with his work."

== Awards and nominations ==
Ceremony	Category	Nominee	Result	Ref.
IIFA Utsavam 2015	Best Lyrics	Devi Sri Prasad (for the song "Super Machi")	Nominated	
Gulf Andhra Music Awards	Best Commercial Song	Devi Sri Prasad and Sravana Bhargavi (for the song "Super Machi")	Won	
Gulf Andhra Music Awards	Best Upcoming Singer – Male	Yazin Nizar (for the song "Seethakalam")	Won	
5th South Indian International Movie Awards	Best Music Director (Telugu)	Devi Sri Prasad	Nominated	
5th South Indian International Movie Awards	Best Lyricist (Telugu)	Devi Sri Prasad (for the song "Super Machi")	Nominated	
2016 CineMAA Awards	Best Music Director	Devi Sri Prasad	Won	

== Legacy ==
Super Machi (2022), is an upcoming film featuring Kalyaan Dhev and Rachita Ram, and directed by Puli Vasu. The title of the film is adapted from the "Super Machi" track of the album.
