= Saahore Baahubali =

- Cover of the song, featuring actor Prabhas

Song by Daler Mehndi, M.M. Keeravani, Mounima

from the album Baahubali 2: The Conclusion
- Released: 26 March 2017
- Genre: Filmi
- Length: 3:29
- Label: Lahari Music
- Lyricists: Siva Shakthi Datta, K. Ramakrishna

Music video
- "Saahore Baahubali" on YouTube

"Saahore Baahubali" (transl. Glory be to Baahubali) is a Telugu song from the 2017 film Baahubali 2: The Conclusion. Sung by Daler Mehndi, the song is composed by M. M. Keeravani, with lyrics penned by his father Siva Shakti Datta and K. Ramakrishna. Most of the lyrics were written in Sanskrit.

The music video of the track features Prabhas, who plays Amarendra Baahubali, the protagonist of the film, in various action sequences. The song also shows the close bond between Amarendra Baahubali and the Rajamatha Sivagami.

== Release ==
The audio of the song was released on 24 March 2017 along with other tracks in the album. The music video of the song was officially released three weeks after the film's release through the YouTube channel of T-Series Telugu. The video of the song has received more than 102 million views on YouTube as of 12 March 2018.

The song was released in Tamil as Bale Bale Bale on 9 April 2017, in Hindi as Jiyo Re Baahubali on 5 April 2017, and in Malayalam as Bali Bali Baahubali on 24 April 2017.

On 1 December 2017, Google announced the most streamed list and Saahore Baahubali topped the list of most streamed Indian songs.

== Reception ==
The Indian Express writes, "The song is about people celebrating the legend of Amarendra Baahubali. And it shows Prabhas in a more intense avatar coupled with his matured performance and body language." It also writes, "The theme of SS Rajamouli's film resonates in this uplifting track." Bollywood Hungama writes, "Watch Baahubali 2's promo Saahore Baaahubali now!"
