= Ramayya Vasthavayya (soundtrack) =

Soundtrack album To Ramayya Vasthavayya by S. Thaman
- Released: 21 September 2013
- Recorded: 2013
- Genre: Feature film soundtrack
- Length: 23:47
- Language: Telugu
- Label: Aditya Music
- Producer: S. Thaman

S. Thaman chronology
Pattathu Yaanai (2013)	Ramayya Vasthavayya (2013)	Masala (2013)

Ramayya Vasthavayya is the soundtrack to the 2013 Telugu romantic-action film of the same name, directed by Harish Shankar and starring N. T. Rama Rao Jr., Samantha Ruth Prabhu and Shruti Haasan. The soundtrack album originally includes six tracks composed by S. Thaman and was released on 21 September 2013. The release coincided with a promotional event held at Hotel Marriott in Hyderabad, India. The album was officially released by Aditya Music, one of the prominent music companies in South India. The audio went on to receive positive response from reviewers and audience alike thanks to the promos released.

== Production ==
S. Thaman composed the music for this film which marks his Third collaboration with Jr NTR and second collaboration with Harish Shankar. The promo of the song Jabilli Nuvve Cheppamma was released on 30 August 2013 which got Viral response on the Internet with more than 1.2 million views and over 10,000 likes in just five days of its release in YouTube. Aditya Music purchased the audio rights which was confirmed by them in their official Twitter, Facebook pages and YouTube Channel. On 5 September 2013 the track list was released on the Internet with a remix of Ilaiyaraaja's chart busters, raising much expectations on the audio. On 17 September 2013 director Harish Shankar has posted a song-making video on YouTube, which features him talking about the romantic song Neneppudaina Anukunnana that was shot in the beautiful locales of Spain with Jr NTR and Shruti Haasan which was sung by Shankar Mahadevan and Shreya Ghoshal. On 19 September 2013 it was officially confirmed that the audio of the film would be launched on 21 September 2013 at Hotel Marriott in Hyderabad. However, on 20 September 2013 the real track list was officially released with the promo songs released on the same day. On 21 September 2013 the theatrical trailer and soundtrack Album were launched. After the audio album received rave response, Thaman started scoring the background music for the film within a span of 3 days from the audio launch of the film.

== Track list ==
Telugu
No.	Title	Lyrics	Artist(s)	Length
1.	"Jabilli Nuvve Cheppamma"	Anantha Sreeram	Ranjith	3:47
2.	"Pandaga Chesko"	Sri Mani	KK	4:14
3.	"O Lailaa"	Bhaskarabhatla Ravi Kumar	Rahul Nambiar, Jr. NTR (Vocals)	4:23
4.	"Nenepudaina Anukunnana"	Sahithi	Shankar Mahadevan, Shreya Ghoshal	3:48
5.	"Kurrayeedu"	Sri Mani	Suchitra, Shankar Mahadevan	4:02
6.	"Idhi Ranarangam"	Sri Mani	Ranjith, Rahul Nambiar, Naveen Madhav	3:33
Total length:				28:15

All lyrics are written by Rafeeq Ahmed.

Malayalam
No.	Title	Artist(s)	Length
1.	"O Lailaa"	Pradeep Palluruthy	3:47
2.	"Nee Mulla Poovin"	Vidhu Prathap	4:14
3.	"Idivettu Vannaalum"	Sam Shiva	4:23
4.	"Pattusaariyil Pothinju"	Pradeep Palluruthy, Priya Jerson	3:48
5.	"Nee Swapnamaayente"	Sam Shiva, K. S. Chithra	4:02
6.	"Ithu Ranarangam"	Anwar Sadath, Durga Vishwanath	03:33
Total length:			28:15

== Reception ==
The audio received positive response. 123Telugu wrote "The audio album of Ramayya Vasthavayya is a fusion of melodious and peppy tunes. Jabilli Nuvve Cheppamma, in particular, deserves special mention for being one of the best melodies in NTR’s career. Harish Shankar and Thaman have worked together to come up with a nice platform for NTR to showcase his talent." IndiaGlitz wrote "Ramayya Vasthavayya does sound a very auspicious title. In keeping with the tradition of Dil Raju and the first outing of Raju with NTR, Brindavanam, this audio thoroughly lives up to the expectations. A range of talent dish out the best. The album is perfect in that Ranjith mesmerises as much as Shankar Mahadevan does. And Sri Mani is as good as Bhaskarabhatla." way2movies.com wrote "All in all, Ramayya Vasthavayya album is quite impressive with mix of peppy tracks and melodies. Thaman delivers his best and scores a hattrick with NTR. Jabilli Nuvvecheppamma, Neneppudaina are the best melodies of NTR-Thaman combo till date making great impact on the listeners. Ramayya Vasthavayya lives up to the expectations." Cinema65.com wrote "Finally Thaman is Given the fantastic Tracks for the film, As we compared to his previous films, he has given a fresh music and new tunes to the film, By listening this songs, we can see that he kept his heart and soul to compose the songs. Listen to the Songs with the full Volume, You will be definitely addicted to the Album." 143cinema.com wrote "The album could be said as a mix of Thaman and Harish Shankar Style. Overall a good album for a star hero that lives up to the expectations of the fans but not as career best for Thaman as they said."
