= Daler Mehndi =

Indian singer (born 1967)

- Mehndi performing live in 2015

Background information
- Born: Daler Singh; 18 August 1967 (age 59); Patna, Bihar, India
- Genres: Bhangra; Indi-pop
- Occupations: Singer; songwriter; record producer
- Years active: 1990–present
- Label: D Records
- Website: dalermehndi.com
- Family: Mika Singh (brother)
- Criminal information
- Status: Released
- Conviction: Human trafficking
- Penalty: 2 years in prison (suspended after 2 months)
- Political party: Bharatiya Janata Party

Daler Singh (born 18 August 1967), better known as Daler Mehndi, is an Indian singer, songwriter, author, and record producer. He has helped to make Bhangra popular worldwide, as well as Indian pop music independent of Bollywood music. He is known for his dance songs, turban, and long flowing robes.

== Early life ==
Daler Mehndi was born in Patna, Bihar, India in a Punjabi Sikh family. In 1991, he formed his group, composed of his brothers, cousins, and friends. In 1994, he was awarded the Voice of Asia International Ethnic and Pop Music Contest in 1994 in Almaty, Kazakhstan.

== Music career ==
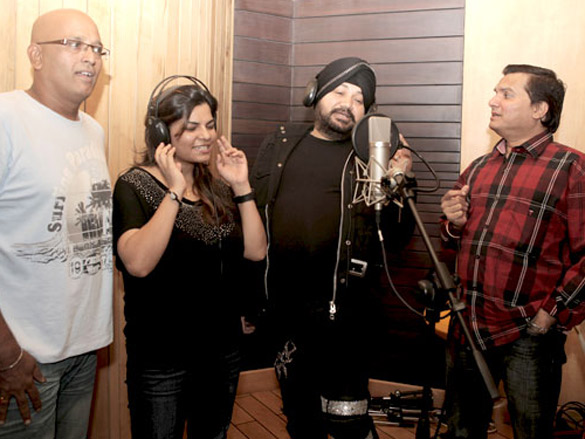
Song recording for the 2012 Bollywood film Chaalis Chauraasi

Magnasound signed Mehndi for a three-album contract for three years. Bolo Ta Ra Ra, Mehndi's debut album, sold over 20 million copies. The album established Daler as a pop star, which also won him the Channel V's Best Indian Male Pop Artist Award. A year later, his second album under Magnasound, Dardi Rab Rab, was launched. This album surpassed the sales of Bolo Ta Ra Ra. He was nominated in three categories at the Channel V Music Awards and won the Channel V Best Indian Male Artist Award.

In 1997, he released his third album, Balle Balle. This got him Channel V Awards in six categories. Like his previous albums, Balle Balle went multi-platinum. The same year, Mehndi composed and performed the popular track "Na Na Na Re" for the Bollywood film Mrityudata, where he featured on the big screen with Amitabh Bachchan. The film's Bollywood soundtrack album sold 1.5 million units in India.

In 1998, he released "Tunak Tunak Tun", which had a music video produced on a then unprecedented budget of ₹25 million ($610,000), equivalent to ₹123 million ($0.83 million) adjusted for inflation. The song and video was a success in India, cementing Mehndi's status as India's biggest popstar at the time, later becoming an international success. The album won the award for Best Indian Pop Album at the 1998 Screen Awards.

In 2000, Mehndi released his album Ek Dana with the music label TIPS Music. The album had a mix of genres ranging from folk, rock, and pop. One of the more popular songs of the album Sajan Mere Satrangiya featured Indian actress Priyanka Chopra in the video. This video was released in the year that Chopra won the Miss World title. Subsequently, Mehndi signed up with Universal Music in 2001 and released a new track "Kala Kauwa Kaat Khayega". In 2003, Mehndi forayed into playback singing for films. He started with the song "Ru-Ba-Ru" for the film Maqbool. The same year Daler and A.R Rahman came together to give another track "Nach Le" for Lakeer – Forbidden Lines which the song reused "Thaniye" from the Tamil-Telugu film Rhythm. He fused Rock with Bhangra with his next album titled Mojaan Laen Do and in 2004 he self-produced Shaa Ra Ra.

In March 2014, Deadmau5 and Mehndi made a remix of Mehndi's 1998 hit "Tunak Tunak Tun" performed by the duo.

On Navratri 2014, Mehndi composed and recorded his rendition of the 'Hanuman Chalisa' overnight while working at his studio in Delhi. Daler Mehndi, feeling inspired during the festival of Navratri, composed and record his rendition of the 'Hanuman Chalisa' in the DM Folk Studio.

In September 2014, Mehndi released his song 'Aaja Mere Twitter Te' to encourage users to visit his Twitter account and Facebook page.

On 6 November 2014, Mehndi released his album Best of Gurbani on the occasion of Guru Nanak Jayanti.

=== Tours ===
In 1998, Mehndi was signed by Coca-Cola for product endorsement and was featured in 30 concerts across India. He has performed worldwide including the United States, Canada, Australia, New Zealand, the United Kingdom, the United Arab Emirates, South Africa, East Africa, Oman, Kuwait, Bahrain, Malaysia, Pakistan, Hong Kong, Singapore, West Indies, Belgium, and the Netherlands.

On 29 September 2013, Daler performed at the YouFest festival in Spain. He has had an advent with Canadian electronic dance music artist Deadmau5 in a Lamborghini Murciélago LP670-4 SuperVeloce, Daler featured on his tour in India and together they produced an EDM remixed version of "Tunak Tunak Tun".

In August 2014, Mehndi was invited as the guest of honour along with U.S Congressman Pete Sessions for the closing bell ceremony at NASDAQ Stock Exchange in New York, after which he performed at the National Indian American Public Policy Institute Azadi Diwas (NIAPPI) celebrations on the occasion of the 65th Independence Day.

Mehndi delivered his first-ever performance in Kuwait on 5 September. Welcomed by a packed audience at the Al Daiya Indoor Stadium, he broke his record for the longest live performance without a break by performing for four and a half hours non-stop.

The concert organised by the Indian Cultural Society (ICS) has been named 'Bolo Ta Ra Ra Ra' in honour of Daler Mehndi's globally popular track by the same name.

On the eve of Guru Nanak Jayanti, Mehndi was invited to Ulhas Nagar to perform at the world's largest Prabhat Pheri.

In November 2014, Mehndi visited Mandsaur, Madhya Pradesh for a performance.

In November 2014, Mehndi was invited to Nigeria for a performance to celebrate Diwali. This was the second time the musician has performed in the country.

== Artistry ==
Mehndi is credited for creating a genre called "Rabbabi", a combination of Thumri, Sufi, and rock and creating an instrument called "Swar Mandir" that combines influences from the Rabab, Swarmandal, and Tanpura. The instrument was crafted by Sanjay Rikhi Ram from Delhi and was launched on 10 February 2012 by the Indian classical music maestro, Bharat Ratna awardee Pandit Ravi Shankar.

== Business ventures ==
Mehndi launched his maiden Record Label 'DRecords' in the year 2000. The record label has several artists under its banner including Hussain Baksh and Safri Boys.

== Pop culture ==
Mehndi's "Tunak Tunak Tun" has found popularity on the internet as a viral video, with the official YouTube video gaining over 200 million views as of November 2022. The video game company Blizzard Entertainment incorporated the Tunak Tunak Tun dance as a character animation in their multiplayer role playing game World of Warcraft. This dance is also included as an easter egg in the video game Medal of Honor: Allied Assault: Spearhead.

== Personal life ==
=== Family life ===
Mehndi is the brother of singers Mika Singh and Shamsher Singh. Mehndi is married to Taranpreet Kaur. He has four children – Gurdeep Mehndi, Ajit Kaur Mehndi, Prabhjot Kaur Mehndi, and Rabaab Kaur Mehndi. His daughter Ajit Kaur Mehndi is married to Navraj Hans, son of Punjabi singer Hans Raj Hans. Gurdeep Mehndi married NRI model, Jessica Singh in 2016.

In 2018, Mehndi was convicted of human trafficking and was sentenced to two years in prison. After serving around two months, his sentence was suspended and he was released.

=== Philanthropy ===
==== Daler Mehndi Green Drive ====
In 1998, Mehndi launched the "Daler Mehndi Green Drive", inducted in the Special Task Force of the Delhi Government. The drive has planted over 1.2 million saplings in and around Delhi.

==== Charitable causes ====
Mehndi has performed for charity for Imran Khan's Shaukat Khanum Memorial Trust in Pakistan and helped raise $5 million. Mehndi supports charitable causes such as cancer, thalassemia, and AIDS, and has helped to bring up the homeless children of Kenya as well as famine-stricken families in Kalahandi in Orissa, India. He financially supported the families of Kargil martyrs by donating to the Indian government's Kargil Victims' Relief Fund. Mehndi was one of the first celebrities to go and visit the soldiers at Kargil. Mehndi has constructed earthquake-resistant houses for the Gujarat earthquake victims; he donated money and performed to raise money for Gujarat cyclone and quake victims, and for police welfare funds. He has donated ₹10 million in Vadodara for the victims of the cyclone in the government aid fund. He took upon himself the reconstruction of a block devastated in the Gujarat quake in Doodhiya village.

Mehndi has set up a Daler Mehndi Food for Life Society in Chander Vihar, Delhi, where a 24-hour kitchen provides food to the destitute and the underprivileged. Mehndi has constructed a Gurudwara Dukh Bhanjani Sahib where every morning people from all castes and religions join and offer service in the name of god. Mehndi is the only known Indian artist to be invited by the President of Pakistan as a state guest. He gifted his album Bismillah to the President Zardari of Pakistan and the funds generated from its sale were given to the President's charitable fund.

Mehndi voiced his protest against the International Basketball Federation's (FIBA) controversial ruling on the use of turbans while playing. The singer made a video to raise awareness about the issue and to have the policy changed.

=== Politics ===
Mehndi joined the Bharatiya Janata Party on 26 April 2019.

=== Human trafficking conviction ===
Mehndi and six others were accused in 2003 of cheating people of large sums of money by falsely promising to take them to America. In March 2018, Mehndi was sentenced to two years in prison by Patiala court in a human trafficking case. The singer and his brother Shamsher were charged for illegally sending people abroad as a part of their dance troupes. Daler was arrested after registration of the case and released on bail after a few days. Mehndi said he will appeal against the conviction in a higher court.

The Patiala court dismissed his appeal in 2022 and upheld the two year imprisonment, but shortly thereafter his sentence was suspended by the Punjab and Haryana high court and Mehndi was granted bail in September 2022.

=== Uttarakhand concert ===
In October 2026, Mehndi became involved in a controversy after Uttarakhand cabinet minister Subodh Uniyal interrupted his performance at an event in Kunjapuri Mela, Tehri Garhwal, alleging that the singer was intoxicated and questioning whether he was fit to perform live. Uniyal also claimed that Mehndi had been paid ₹35 lakh for the performance, apart from travel and accommodation expenses. The incident went viral on social media, prompting public reprimand. The controversy sparked debate over artists' professional responsibilities and their treatment at public events. Several celebrities, including Mehndi's brother Mika Singh, and actor Anupam Kher expressed their support for him and criticised Uniyal's decision to "humiliate" him publicly. Uniyal refused to apologise to Mehndi, defending his actions and deeming Mehndi's conduct at the concert as a "crime".

== Discography ==
- Bolo Ta Ra Ra.. – 1995
- Dardi Rab Rab – 1996
- Ho Jayegi Balle Balle – 1997
- The Best of Daler Mehndi – album, 1998
- Tunak Tunak Tun – 1998
- Ek Dana – 2000
- Nabi Buba Nabi – 2001
- Lehriya – 2001
- Nach Ni Shaam Kaure – 2002
- Mojaan Laen Do – 2003
- Shaa Ra Ra Ra – 2004
- Destiny – 2005
- Raula Pai Gaya – 2007
- Eh Lai 100 Rupaiya, 2008
- "300 Saal Guru De Naal", 2008
- "Dhoom Punjabi- IPL Kings XI Punjab Theme song" , 2008
- "Jago India", 2008
- Shamla Meri Koko, 2008
- Jugni, 2008
- Jorsey, 2009
- "Mere Ram",2010
- "CWG Song- Khel Ley" ,2010
- Tunak Tunak Tumba, 2011
- Bhalo Bhalo re Kirtaniya, 2011
- Japji Sahib The Libreation Chant, 2011
- "F1 Anthem - Hum Mein Hai Raftaar", 2011
- 300 Saal Guru De Naal, 2012
- Sai Da Malang, 2012
- Maula Sai, 2012
- Bismillah, 2012
- Rajan Ke Raja, 2012
- Sardaar, 2013
- Allah Hu, 2013
- Dukh Banjni Sahib, 2013
- The Ultimate Truth Mool Mantra, 2013
- Ik Ardaas Bhaat Kirat KI, 2013
- Ik Fakir Vadda Mastana, 2013
- Mere Raam Mere Raam, 2013
- India India, Patriot music album, 2013
- Cricket Nahi Yeh Tamasha Hai, 2013
- Bhaag The Success Anthem, 2013
- Namoh Namoh, 2013
- Aaja Mere Twitter Te, 2014
- Sona Roop Hai Peeli Peeli Sarson, 2014
- Stop The Flight, 2014
- Asi Tan Jithe, 2014
- Dilruba, 2014
- Baani Dasam Granth, 2014
- Best of Gurbani, 2014
- Radha Raman Hari Bol, 2014
- Bhaag Khilad Bhaag, 2014
- Party Punjabi, 2015
- Sabhae Jee Samal, 2015
- Safai Ki Dhun, 2015
- Salla Vella Funda, 2015
- Sohniye, 2015
- Sabhae Jee Samal, 2015
- Maa Padmavati, 2015
- Om Mani Padme Hum, 2015
- Khalsa, 2015
- "Sabhae -Jee-Samaal" ,2015
- Baba Nanak Mere Naal Naal, 2015
- Hori Khelungi Baba Bullehshah, 2016
- Salok Mahalla 9 Jo Sukh Ko Chaahai Sadaa, 2016
- 350 Saal Sache Patshah Naal, 2016
- Japji Sahib-with Church Organ, 2016
- Saahore Baahubali, 2017
- "Koee Jachdi Na Thaan" ,2017
- "Apne GharMein Shaadi Hai", 2017
- Reddy Ikkada Soodu, 2018
- Jaragandi (Telugu), 2024
- Jaragandi (Tamil), 2024
- Jaragandi (Hindi), 2024

== Filmography ==
Year	Song title	Film title	Co-singer	Language
1997	"Na Na Na Na Re"	Mrityudatta	Sudesh Bhosle	Hindi
1999	"Kudiyan Shaher Diyan"	Arjun Pandit	Alka Yagnik	Hindi
2000	"Nach Baby Nach Kudi"	Khauff	Asha Bhosle	Hindi
2003	"Kajrare Kajrare Nainawale"	Chupke Se	solo	Hindi
2004	"Ru-Ba-Ru"	Maqbool	Rakesh Pandit, Sabir Khan, Dominique Cerejo	Hindi
2004	"Nachley"	Lakeer – Forbidden Lines	Kunal Ganjawala	Hindi
2004	Agar Zindagi Se	Wajahh: A Reason To Kill	solo	Hindi
2005	"Ishq Aasan Hai"	Bullet: Ek Dhamaka	solo	Hindi
2005	"Bhool Na Jaying"	Ramji Londonwaley	Rakesh Pandit	Hindi
2006	"Rang De Basanti"	Rang De Basanti	K. S. Chithra	Hindi
2006	"Tutiya Ve"	Shaadi Se Pehle	solo	Hindi
2006	"Tutiya Ve" (remix)	Shaadi Se Pehle	solo	Hindi
2007	"Doha"	Just Married	solo	Hindi
2007	"Hum Raks"	Kaafila	Sukhwinder Singh	Hindi
2007	"Rabbaru Gajulu"	Yamadonga	Rabbaru Gajulu	Telugu
2007	"Talwar Re"	Chhodon Naa Yaar	Sunidhi Chauhan	Hindi
2007	"Talwar Re (Remix)"	Chhodon Naa Yaar	Sunidhi Chauhan, Anand Raj Anand	Hindi
2007	"Talwar Re (Dhol Mix)"	Chhodon Naa Yaar	Sunidhi Chauhan	Hindi
2007	"Kash Laga"	No Smoking	Sukhwinder Singh, Vishal Bhardwaj	Hindi
2007	"Halla Bol"	Goal	solo	Hindi
2007	"Aasman Ko Chukar"	Return of Hanuman	solo	Hindi
2024	"Na Na Na Na Na Re"	Vicky Vidya Ka Woh Wala Video	Gurdeep Mehndi	Hindi

- Mrityudatta – Na Na Na Na Na Re, 1997
- Arjun Pandit – Kudiyan Shehar Diyan, 1999
- Khauff – Ankh Ladti Hai, 2000
- Maqbool – Ru Ba Ru, 2003
- Chupke Se – Kajrare Kajrare Naino Wale, 2003
- Bullet Ek Dhmaka – Ishq Aasaan Hai, 2003
- Lakeer – Nach Le, 2004
- Wajah – Agar Zindagi Se, 2004
- Ramji London Waley – Bhool Na Jaying, 2005
- Rang De Basanti – Rang De Basanti, 2006
- Shadi Se Pehle – Tuteya Ve Tuteya, 2006
- Chodo Na Yaar – Talwar Re, 2007
- Hanuman Returns – Aasma Ko Chukar, 2007
- Goal – Halla Bol, 2007
- Just Married – Doha, 2007
- Kafila – Hum Raks, 2007
- No Smoking – Kash Laga, 2007
- Yamadonga – Rabbaru Gajulu Rabbaru Gajulu, 2007
- Singh Is King – Bhootni Ke, 2008
- Ghatothkach – Maya Bazaar, 2008
- Sunday – Loot Liya, 2008
- Victory – Balla Utha Chhakka Laga, 2008
- Mr. Black Mr. White – Tu Makke Di Roti Meri, 2008
- Money Hai To Honey Hai – Rangeeli Raat, 2008
- Kuselan – Om Zaarare, 2008
- Kathanayakudu - Om Zaarare, 2008
- Hello – Karle Baby Dance Wance, 2008
- Dhoom Dhadaka – Dhoom Dhadaka, 2008
- Kissan – Mere Desh Ki Dharti, 2009
- Ek Se Bure Do – Ishq Ke Zaat, 2009
- Magadheera – Chapana Chaptu, 2009
- Lahore – Musafir, 2010
- Dulha Mil Gaya – Dulha Mil Gaya, 2010
- Khatta Meetha – Aila Re Aila, 2010
- Action Replayy – Zor Ka Jhatka, 2010
- Yamla Pagla Deewana – Chamki Jawani, 2011
- Teen Thay Bhai – Teen Thay Bhai, 2011
- Dear Friend Hitler – Hara Shwet Kesariya, 2011
- Miley Naa Miley Hum – Katto Gilheri, 2011
- Rascal – Tik Tuk, 2011
- Love Kiya Aur Lag Gayi – Love Kiya Aur Lag Gayi, 2011
- I Am Singh – 2 songs: Dukalaang Praanasi and I Am Singh, 2011
- Life Ki Toh Lag Gayi – Haryana Ka Sher, 2012
- Srimannarayana – Chalaaki Choopultho, 2012
- Joker – Sing Raja, 2012
- Chaalis Chauraasi – Badmast, 2012
- Kyaa Super Kool Hain Hum – Hum Toh Hain Cappucino, 2012
- Sarsa – UNRELEASED, 2012
- Baadshah – Banti Poola Janki, 2013
- Commando – Lena Dena, 2013
- Sardaar – Ruk Ja Tham Ja, 2013
- Bhaag Milkha Bhaag – Gurbani, 2013
- War Chhod Na Yaar – Phat Gaya, 2013
- Besharam – Chal Hand Utha Ke Nach Le, 2013
- Namo Boothatma – Paisa Paisa, 2014
- 47 to 84 – Beriyane Teriyane, 2014
- Yamaleela 2 – O Thayaru, 2014
- Janiva – Moriya Moriya, 2014
- Goreyan Nu Daffa Karo – Dishkayon, 2014
- Kabab Mein Haddi – Kabab Mein Haddi, 2014
- Yoddha – Yoddha, 2014
- ABCD 2 – Vande Mataram, 2015
- A Flying Jatt – Raj Karega Khalsa, 2016
- Mirzya – Title song, 2016
- Saadey CM Saab – Dharti De Puttar Hain Ge Gabhru, 2016
- Dangal – Title song, 2016
- Baahubali 2: The Conclusion- Saahore Baahubali; Jiyo Re Bahubali, 2017
- Poster Boys – Kudiyan Shehar Diyan, 2017
- Paisa Vasool – Paisa Vasool, 2017
- Harjeeta – Dekhi Ja, 2018
- Soorma – Flicker Singh, 2018
- Gold – Title song, 2018
- Aravinda Sametha Veera Raghava – Reddy Ikkada Soodu, 2018
- Kaashi in Search of Ganga – Title Song, 2018
- Uri: The Surgical Strike – Jagga Jiteya, 2019
- Chhalaang - Le Chhalaang, 2020
- Hum Do Hamare Do - "Raula Pae Gayaa", 2021
- Atrangi Re - "Garda", 2021
- Animal - "Arjan Vailly",2023
- Rang De Basanti - (Bhojpuri film)
