= Rakesh Pandit =

Indian Singer (born 1967)

- Genres: Classical Singing, Semi-Classical Singing, Ghazals Singing, Sufi Singing, Folk Singing, Bhajan Singing, Playback Singing
- Occupations: Singer, musician
- Instruments: Vocals, Harmonium
- Years active: 1989–present
- Labels: T-Series, Tips, Saregama, Venus Records & Tapes

Rakesh Pandit (born 8 September 1967) is an Indian Singer whose songs have been featured mainly in Hindi Movies and sung over 100 Bollywood songs. He has released Indian pop albums and gave many live performances.

== Personal life ==
Rakesh Pandit was born on 8 September 1967 in Borivali, Mumbai to a great classical artiste Shri. Shambhu Pandit (Well renowned Qawwali Duo in Music Industry as "ShankerShambhu"). He began his singing career at the age of three, when he joined his father Shri. Shambhuji. In his teenage years(12 years), he successfully gave live performances on stage and began his Bollywood singing career at a very early age of 22. He learnt the nuances of music from his dad and uncle Shri.Shanker Pandit.

== Career ==
Rakesh Pandit debuted in 1989 when he rendered his high-pitched voice for Milte Hain Dil Se Dil from the movie Mera Dil Tere Liye. The music director of this movie 'Babul Bose' gave him his first break in Bollywood with a cracking Qawaali which was picturized on Kader Khan, Mamta Kulkarni and Dinesh.

He Won many accolades for his soulful songs:-
Yeh Jo Tera Zikr Hai from Guzaarish (2010)
https://www.imdb.com/title/tt1438298/soundtrack?ref_=tt_trv_snd
Tum Jo Aaye Zindagi Mein, Pee loon in Once Upon A Time In Mumbaai (2010)

He sings in varied genres including Classical, Folk, Bhajan, Ghazal, Qawwali and Sufiana.

== Filmography ==
- Guzaarish
- Omkara
- Maqbool
- Pyaar Ke Side Effects
