= Manam (soundtrack) =

Soundtrack album To Manam by Anup Rubens
- Released: 9 May 2014
- Recorded: 2013
- Genre: Feature film soundtrack
- Length: 24:05
- Language: Telugu
- Label: Aditya Music
- Producer: Anup Rubens

Anup Rubens chronology
Pyar Mein Padipoyane (2014)	Manam (2014)	Oka Laila Kosam (2014)
External audio
- Official Audio Jukebox on YouTube

Manam is the feature film soundtrack album composed by Anup Rubens for the 2014 Telugu Period drama film of the same name directed by Vikram Kumar which featured Akkineni Nageswara Rao, Nagarjuna and Naga Chaitanya along with Shriya Saran and Samantha in the lead roles. The film, which marks Akkineni Nageswara Rao's last on screen appearance is also Anup Rubens' 25th film as a Music Director.

Vanamali, Chandrabose and Anup Rubens himself provided lyrics for the 5 out of 6 songs in the album and the remaining one being the Theme Music of the film. The soundtrack album released on 9 May 2014 on Aditya Music label. Upon release, the soundtrack album received huge applause from critics and audience with many critics opining it as the best work of Anoop Rubens till date. As a result of the positive reviews and responses for this soundtrack, Anoop Rubens received his maiden Filmfare Award for Best Music Director.

== Development ==
In mid March 2013, Anup Rubens was recruited to compose music for the film marking his second collaboration with Vikram Kumar after Ishq and Naga Chaitanya after Autonagar Surya and this film also marked his biggest project till date by then. In a press note released in the end of November 2013 which spoke about the film's shoot in Coorg mentioned that Chandrabose and Vanamali would provide the lyrics for the songs of the film. The film also marks Anoop Rubens 25th film as a Music composer. In mid February 2014, it was reported that the hit song Oka Laila Kosam would be remixed in the film but an official statement was awaited for that. However, verses of the song Nenu Putanu were used in the song Piyo Piyo Re.

== Track listing ==
The official Track list was released on 8 May 2014 by Nagarjuna himself on Twitter. The tracklist featured 5 songs and a theme music with Vanamali, Chandrabose and Anup Rubens penning the lyrics and popular singers Shreya Ghoshal, Arijit Singh, Chaitra H. G., Haricharan and Jaspreet Jasz providing the vocals along with new singers.

Telugu Tracklist
No.	Title	Lyrics	Artist(s)	Length
1.	"Kanulanu Thaake"	Vanamali	Arijit Singh	4:55
2.	"Chinni Chinni Aasalu"	Chandrabose	Shreya Ghoshal, Ashwin, Hari	5:21
3.	"Manam" (Theme)		Chaitra Ambadipudi (Instrumental)	2:12
4.	"Kani Penchina Maa Ammake"	Chandrabose	Bharath	4:08
5.	"Piyo Piyo Re"	Anup Rubens	Benny Dayal, Jaspreet Jasz, Anup Rubens, Meghraj, Rahul	3:21
6.	"Edhi Prema"	Chandrabose	Haricharan	4:08
Total length:				24:05

== Release ==
In the second week of May, it was reported that the soundtrack album of the film would be released directly into the market on 9 May 2014 without hosting any audio function as a mark of respect for Akkineni Nageswara Rao. The official Track list was released on 8 May 2014 by Nagarjuna himself on Twitter. The Track list released then also confirmed that Aditya Music won the audio rights of the film. The film's audio was launched on 9 May 2014 by Aditya Music's streaming section in YouTube instead of opting for a promotional audio launch event.

== Marketing ==
On 26 April 2014 the song Piyo Piyo Re was released fully with lyrics into the internet officially by Nagarjuna as a part of the film's promotion. The song was a remixed version of the song Nenu Puttanu from Akkineni Nageswara Rao's evergreen film Prem Nagar. After the audio's release, the positive reception of the song Chinni Chinni Aasalu prompted the makers to release the making video of that song which featured Nagarjuna and Shriya Saran. Shot in the backdrop of a village the song featured Nagarjuna dressed as a farmer while Shriya Saran seemed like his innocent village wife. On the other hand, it also showcased the singers Shreya Ghoshal, Ashwin and Hari recording their parts for the songs. The making video too received positive response. The making of the song Kanulanu Thaake was released on 14 May 2014 which featured Naga Chaitanya and Samantha. The celebration of the audio's success was celebrated on 15 May 2014 by hosting a promotional event for the same. However, there was no live telecast of the event and it was telecasted on Gemini TV on 18 May 2014.

== Reception ==
The soundtrack received huge applause from all the corners and the songs Chinni Chinni Aasalu and Kanulanu Thaake received rave reviews. The Times of India gave a review stating "Overall, Manam's tunes are really hearttouching and comes like a breath of fresh air for the listeners." IndiaGlitz gave a review stating "When Anup Rubens was selected for Manam, it was perhaps not expected that someone known for his romantic songs will excel in doing justice to a demanding and different genre like Manam. It turns out that Manam is a family entertainer with a difference. If the trailer raised the bar, the album raises the bar even more. A complete offering, it has entertaining songs with lyrics that can make you want to listen again and again." 123telugu.com gave a review stating "On the whole, Anup Rubens gives Manam’s music album a breath of fresh air amidst the current fast beat and maddening mass numbers. Piyo Piyo Re, Kanulanu Taake, Chinni Chinni Aasalu are sure shot hits and our picks. Finally, the ANR family has a class and meaningful album in their hands, and have half the battle won already" and called the album an "Anup Ruben’s Masterpiece". gulte.com gave a review stating "Very rarely we hear to some albums that churn out all possible emotions from our hearts. Here comes legendary Akkineni Nageswara Rao's last movie 'Manam' album scored by young composer Anup Rubens. To simply make a comment, this album is out there to squeeze an intense emotion out from your hearts" and called it an "Instant Winner". greatandhra.com gave a review stating "Talking about the songs, this is the best album for music director Anoop Rubens till date. Each and every song is soothing and the music lovers are listening to Manam songs in loop."
