= Aravinda Sametha Veera Raghava =

2018 Indian film by Trivikram Srinivas

- Theatrical release poster
- Directed by: Trivikram Srinivas
- Written by: Trivikram Srinivas
- Produced by: S. Radha Krishna
- Starring: N. T. Rama Rao Jr.; Pooja Hegde; Jagapathi Babu; Naveen Chandra; Sunil
- Cinematography: P. S. Vinod
- Edited by: Naveen Nooli
- Music by: S. Thaman
- Production company: Haarika & Hassine Creations
- Release date: 11 October 2018
- Running time: 162 minutes
- Country: India
- Language: Telugu
- Budget: ₹60 crore
- Box office: est. ₹190 crore

Aravinda Sametha Veera Raghava (transl. Veera Raghava along with Aravinda) is a 2018 Indian Telugu-language action drama film written and directed by Trivikram Srinivas. The film stars N. T. Rama Rao Jr. and Pooja Hegde alongside Jagapathi Babu, Naveen Chandra, Eesha Rebba and Sunil. S. Thaman composed the soundtrack, in his official 100th musical composition.

The film follows Veera Raghava Reddy, who returns from London. After a brutal attack that leaves his father dead, Raghava seeks to break the cycle of violence instead of avenging him. He leaves for Hyderabad, where he meets Aravinda and her family, and is compelled to protect them. As his relationship with Aravinda grows, he attempts to end the generational blood feud.

Aravinda Sametha Veera Raghava was released theatrically on 11 October 2018 to positive reviews, with praise directed at the performances of N. T. Rama Rao Jr., Pooja Hegde and Jagapathi Babu, the emotional depth of the story, action choreography, Trivikram's writing and direction, and Thaman's soundtrack and background score. The film was a major commercial success, opening to ₹60 crore and grossing ₹190 crore worldwide, becoming the third highest-grossing Telugu film of 2018. Jagapathi Babu won the Filmfare Best Supporting Actor Award for his performance.

The film is widely considered an antithesis to traditional factionalism based films and is frequently cited in analyses regarding the evolution of the "faction film" genre. It delves into the psychological, emotional, and social repercussions of generational violence, with a specific focus on the role of women in ending such cycles.

== Plot ==
In Vijayawada, Andhra Pradesh, a brutal 30-year feud divides the neighbouring villages of Kommaddi and Nallagudi, led by Narappa Reddy and Basi Reddy, respectively. The conflict originated over a petty gambling dispute when Basi Reddy refused to pay a ₹5 bet to a resident of Kommaddi and beheaded him after being humiliated. The resulting retaliatory cycle costs both Narappa Reddy and Basi Reddy their fathers and brings endless suffering to both factions.

In the present, Narappa Reddy eagerly awaits the return of his son, Veera Raghava Reddy, who has spent twelve years studying in London. However, while traveling from the railway station, they are ambushed by Basi Reddy's men, resulting in the deaths of Narappa Reddy and his brother-in-law. A vengeful Raghava retaliates, killing Basi Reddy's henchmen and stabbing Basi Reddy in the neck, leaving him presumed dead. Devastated by his loss, Raghava brings the bodies home.

Raghava's grandmother, Jeji, and Nagamani, a henchman's wife, urge him to break the cycle of violence. Heeding their advice, Raghava relocates to Hyderabad, hoping that his absence will cool the tempers between the villages. In the city, he befriends Neelambari, a mechanic, and rescues Aravinda, an Anthropology student and the daughter of a prominent lawyer named Saradhi, from goons targeting her father. When Neelambari is mistakenly apprehended by the police for carrying Raghava's gun, Saradhi agrees to secure his release on the condition that Raghava protects his daughters, Aravinda and Sunanda. Raghava accepts and grows close to the family, while Aravinda initially remains distant. However, she befriends him and inadvertently solves his predicament regarding eradicating factionalism in his hometown.

During his time with the family, Raghava narrates a story inspired by his life to Aravinda's younger brother, Prateek, who publishes it in a school magazine. Basi Reddy, having survived the attack, reads the magazine and perceives Raghava's location. He commands his son, Bala Reddy, to execute Raghava. When Bala Reddy's henchmen attempt to abduct Prateek, Raghava thwarts their attempts without taking lives and realizes that Basi Reddy is alive. Further, Bala Reddy successfully abducts Prateek and Aravinda from a mall; Raghava counters by threatening their lives until Prateek and Aravinda are safely released. At Saradhi's behest, Raghava prepares to leave Hyderabad to ensure the family's safety but promises Aravinda that he will return.

Having fallen in love with Raghava and intrigued by his past, Aravinda visits his hometown to uncover his story under the pretext of a documentary on Rayalaseema factionalism, accompanied by Neelambari. She learns the full depth of the conflict and reconciles with him on phone. Meanwhile, Raghava attends a discreet meeting with political incharges and Bala Reddy to negotiate a peace treaty between the villages. Through patience and reason, he successfully convinces a reluctant Bala Reddy to end the feud. Outraged by his son's willingness to abandon the rivalry, Basi Reddy murders Bala Reddy in a fit of rage. He takes Neelambari and Aravinda, who have inadvertently arrived as his guests due to car breakdown upon his wife's request, hostage.

Basi Reddy summons Raghava to a secluded field where the conflict began and wounds both Aravinda and Neelambari to provoke Raghava into a fight. Despite his anger, Raghava refuses to engage in violence. Basi Reddy then reveals that he murdered his own son and framed Raghava to ensure the feud would never end. Disgusted by Basi Reddy's lack of empathy, two of his own henchmen defect, escorting the wounded Aravinda and Neelambari to hospital. Left with no alternative, Raghava kills Basi Reddy and sets the field on fire to erase the evidence.

Following the confrontation, Raghava approaches Basi Reddy's widow and confesses to the killing. Desperate to end the bloodshed that claimed her son, she agrees to conceal the truth and files a police report that Basi Reddy killed their son and absconded, ending the feud. To ensure lasting harmony, Raghava proposes nominating Basi Reddy's widow as the regional MLA and she secures the position unanimously, finally bringing peace to both villages.

== Cast ==
- N. T. Rama Rao Jr. as Mahanandi Veera Raghava Reddy, Narappa Reddy’s son
- Pooja Hegde as Aravinda, Raghava’s love interest and documentary filmmaker
- Jagapathi Babu as Basi Reddy, Raghava's enemy & Balreddy’s father
- Naveen Chandra as Bala Reddy, Basi Reddy's son
- Naga Babu as Mahanandi Narappa Reddy, Raghava's father
- Supriya Pathak as Jeji, Raghava's grandmother
- Devayani as Suguna Reddy, Raghava's mother
- Easwari Rao as Basi Reddy's wife
- Eesha Rebba as Sunandha, Aravindha's younger sister
- Sunil as Neelambari, Raghava's friend
- Rao Ramesh as Krishna Reddy, Political incharge of Nallagudi
- Subhalekha Sudhakar as Sudarshan Reddy, Political incharge of Kommaddi
- Naresh as Saradhi, Aravindha's father
- Lakshmi Gopalaswamy as Aravindha's mother
- Sithara as Varalakshmi Reddy, Raghava's aunt
- Brahmaji as Marappa Reddy, Basi Reddy's henchman
- Shatru as Subba Reddy “Ontichethi Subbadu”, Basi Reddy's henchman
- Vinay Varma as Mahanandi Timma Reddy, Narappa Reddy's father and Raghava's grandfather
- Srinivasa Reddy as Balu, Saradhi's assistant
- Ravi Prakash as Oosanna Reddy, Narappa Reddy's henchman
- Sharath Lohitashwa as Lakshma Reddy, Basi Reddy's father
- Aadarsh Balakrishna as Basi Reddy's henchman
- Hari Teja as Nagamani, Raghava's henchman's wife
- Master Charan Ram as Prateek, Aravindha's younger brother
- Ayyappa P. Sharma
- Pammi Sai as Sudarshan
- Narra Srinivas as Rami Reddy
- Rangadham as Oobaa Reddy
- Ananth as Mechanic

== Production ==
The discussion for this film began with N. T. Rama Rao Jr., when Rao was shooting Nannaku Prematho in 2015 and finally materialised in 2018. Pooja Hegde was selected to collaborate with Rao for the first time. Anirudh Ravichander, who was initially signed on composing the music was replaced by S. Thaman after the failure of Agnyaathavaasi. Natarajan Subramaniam was signed as the cinematographer initially, but dropped out and P. S. Vinod stepped in.

The shooting for the film began on 6 April 2018 with an action sequence in Ramoji Film City of Hyderabad. Filming also took place in Pollachi in June. The shoot was completed in September 2018. Pooja Hegde dubbed her voice in Telugu for the first time in this film.

== Themes ==
"In most of the films based on Rayalaseema factionalism, only the act of violence was glorified; however, none of those films focused on the aftermath of a war. Both Jr NTR and I became interested in starting our story with a bloody act of war to give the film a context and then explore how the protagonist shuns that path to bring peace. Later, when I came up with the idea of focusing on the lives of women and how families are torn apart due to such violence, it gave us a lot more depth to explore."

— Trivikram on why he chose such genre

Aravinda Sametha is based on the factionalism present in the region of Rayalaseema, a theme which was dominant in Telugu cinema during late 1990s and early 2000s.

== Music ==
The soundtrack album of Aravinda Sametha Veera Raghava features four songs composed by S. Thaman, with one song being added in the extended soundtrack of the film. The film was his official 100th musical composition. The audio rights were of the film were purchased by Zee Music Company. Lyrics for the songs were written by Sirivennela Seetharama Sastry, Ramajogayya Sastry, and Penchal Das. Initially, the makers planned to release the full audio album directly into the market, without hosting any audio launch event for the film.

The first single track titled "Anaganaganaga" was released on 15 September 2018. On 18 September 2018, the makers unveiled the second single track titled "Peniviti" sung by Kaala Bhairava, which was termed as an intense, raw, rustic number. The lyrical video of Yeda Poyinadu was released on 25 September 2018.

The tracklist was unveiled on 19 September 2018, and the complete soundtrack album was unveiled the following day, on 20 September 2018.

== Marketing and release ==
On 19 May 2018, the title of the film was revealed as Aravinda Sametha. Jr. NTR was featured in a chiseled avatar who worked out extensively with international trainer Lloyd Stevens for his new look for the film. Also S. Thaman's background music in the motion poster was appreciated by fans. The promotions of the film were commence on 10 September 2018.

A pre-release event was held on 2 October 2018, at H.I.C.C. Novotel hotel in Hyderabad, where the makers also launched the theatrical trailer of the film. The trailer received predominantly positive response from all corners.

Aravinda Sametha Veera Raghava was released theatrically on 11 October 2018. The film was dubbed and released in Tamil as Idhu Ennoda Jilla. The film's Japanese Blu-ray was officially released on 3 April 2024.

== Reception ==
=== Critical reception ===
Srivathsan Nadadhur of The Times of India gave 3.5 out of 5 stars stating, "An emotional drama camouflaged in a commercial exterior, here's a film that's courageous to stand apart from slapstick madness. Trivikram's treatment of this plot scores over his indulgence as Jr NTR delivers another fine performance".

Manoj Kumar R of The Indian Express gave 3 out of 5 stars stating, "Tarak plays his role with a notable maturity that is gained through many films over the course of 18 years. Aravindha is Pooja’s plum role that allows her to capitalize on her strengths."

Janani K India Today gave 3 out of 5 stars stating, "Aravinda Sametha Veera Raghava is a commercial actioner backed by Trivikram's engaging script and Jr NTR's excellent performance. After the debacle of Pawan Kalyan-starrer Agnyaathavaasi, director Trivikram Srinivas has bounced back with Jr NTR's Aravinda Sametha Veera Raghava" The review also praised Hegde, noting, "She has done a commendable job as a documentary filmmaker and a student of anthropology."

News18 gave 3 out of 5 stars stating "Jr NTR elevates tried-tested story of factionalism". Priyanka Sundar of Hindustan Times gave 3 out of 5 stars stating "Jr NTR is the torchbearer of peace in a film on factionalism".

Hemanth Kumar CR of Firstpost wrote "Jr NTR captures the moral dilemma of Raghava quite spectacularly. Pooja Hegde makes a good impression with her role, and for a change, she becomes an intrinsic part of the narrative." Sangeetha Devi Dundoo of The Hindu wrote "Pooja Hegde is impressive as Aravinda. The strength of Aravinda Sametha... is in its writing. Trivikram, with some help from Penchal Das, gives us a film where characters speak the Rayalaseema dialect as though they've done it all their life."

== Awards and nominations ==
Date of ceremony	Award	Category	Recipient(s) and nominee(s)	Result	Ref.
17 February 2019	TSR– TV9 National Film Awards	Best Heroine	Pooja Hegde	Won	
10 August 2019	Sakshi Excellence Awards	Best Actress	Pooja Hegde	Won	
10 August 2019	Sakshi Excellence Awards	Most Popular Actress of the Year	Pooja Hegde	Won	
15 & 16 August 2019	8th South Indian International Movie Awards	Best Film – Telugu	Haarika & Hasinee Creations	Nominated	
15 & 16 August 2019	8th South Indian International Movie Awards	Best Director – Telugu	Trivikram Srinivas	Nominated	
15 & 16 August 2019	8th South Indian International Movie Awards	Best Actor – Telugu	N. T. Rama Rao Jr.	Nominated	
15 & 16 August 2019	8th South Indian International Movie Awards	Best Music Director – Telugu	S. Thaman	Nominated	
15 & 16 August 2019	8th South Indian International Movie Awards	Best Lyricist – Telugu (Peniviti)	Ramajogayya Sastry	Nominated	
15 & 16 August 2019	8th South Indian International Movie Awards	Best Male Playback Singer – Telugu (Peniviti)	Kaala Bhairava	Nominated	
21 December 2019	66th Filmfare Awards South	Best Actor – Telugu	N. T. Rama Rao Jr.	Nominated	
21 December 2019	66th Filmfare Awards South	Best Actress – Telugu	Pooja Hegde	Nominated	
21 December 2019	66th Filmfare Awards South	Best Supporting Actor – Telugu	Jagapati Babu	Won	
21 December 2019	66th Filmfare Awards South	Best Music Director – Telugu	S. Thaman	Nominated	
21 December 2019	66th Filmfare Awards South	Best Lyricist – Telugu (Peniviti)	Ramajogayya Sastry	Nominated	
21 December 2019	66th Filmfare Awards South	Best Male Playback Singer – Telugu (Peniviti)	Kaala Bhairava	Nominated	
21 December 2019	66th Filmfare Awards South	Best Female Playback Singer – Telugu (Reddamma Thalli)	Mohana Bhogaraju	Nominated	
29 September 2019	17th Santosham Film Awards	Best Comedian	Sunil	Won	
29 September 2019	17th Santosham Film Awards	Best Music Director	S. Thaman	Won	
