= Shilpakala Vedika =

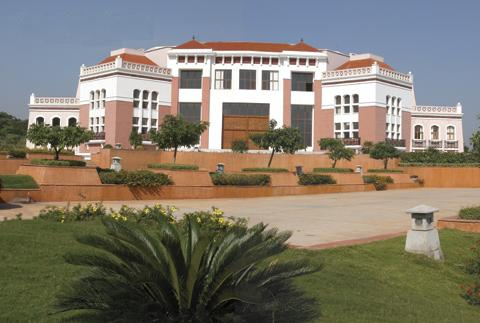

- Location within Telangana

General information
- Type: Auditorium
- Architectural style: Ethnic
- Location: Hyderabad, Telangana, India
- Coordinates: 17.4514°N 78.3771°E
- Completed: 2002
- Opened: 15 June 2002

Design and construction
- Architect: S Sathyanarayana
- Main contractor: Nagarjuna Construction Company

Website
- https://www.shilpakalavedika.in/

Shilpakala Vedika is a terracotta auditorium and convention centre located in Hyderabad, Telangana, India. The auditorium is 5,600 m^{2} (60,000 sq ft) in area. "Shilpa" means sculpture, kala means art, and vedika means platform. Hence it is an art sculpture platform.

The convention center includes an auditorium, which is flexible in design and offers a variety of configurations, and is noted for Telugu film audio release functions.

== The auditorium ==
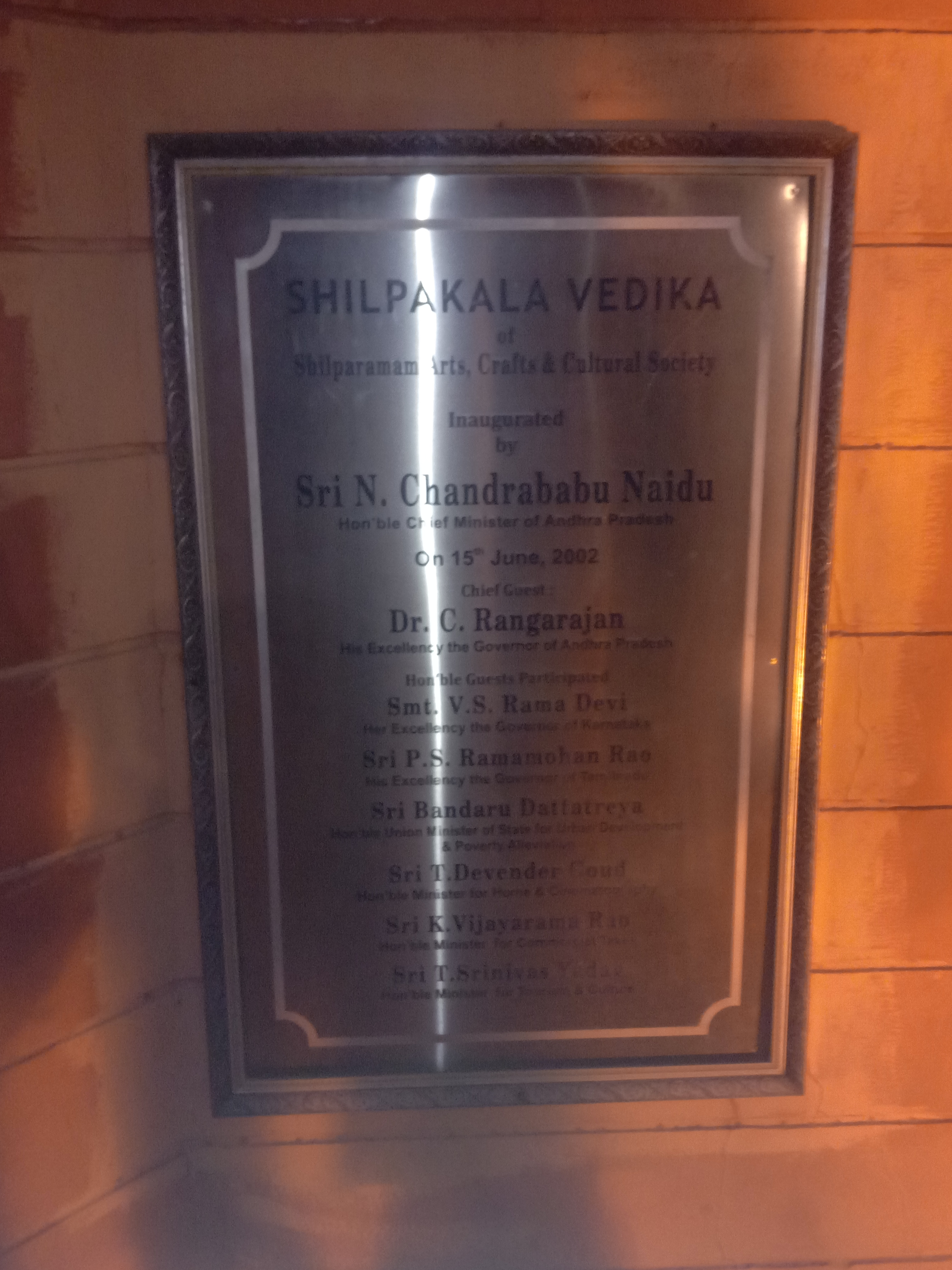
Shilpa Kala Vedika Inaugural Stone

Shilpakala Vedika, constructed under government of United Andhra Pradesh in 2001, is located in a 5,600 m^{2} (60,000 sq ft) plot, on a 20,000 square metres (5 acres) land, with a seating capacity of 2,500. It was inaugurated on 15 June 2002 by then Chief Minister of United Andhra Pradesh, N. Chandrababu Naidu. C. Rangarajan, then Governor of United Pradesh was the chief guest of the inaugural event.

The facility has a press room, cafeteria, multi-media projection system, and green rooms.

== Awards ==
- ACCE SIMPLEX AWARD 2006 for Innovative Design of Structures other than Industrial structure to S Sathyanarayana, Hyderabad for Design of Silpakala Vedika Multi Purpose Indoor Auditorium.

== See also ==
- Film Nagar
