= Lenin (film) =

- Theatrical release poster
- Directed by: Murali Kishor Abburu
- Written by: Murali Kishor Abburu
- Produced by: Akkineni Nagarjuna; Suryadevara Naga Vamsi
- Starring: Akhil Akkineni; Bhagyashri Borse; Pramod Panju
- Cinematography: Leon Britto
- Edited by: Naveen Nooli
- Music by: Thaman S
- Production companies: Manam Enterprises LLP; Sithara Entertainments
- Distributed by: see below
- Release date: 10 July 2026
- Running time: 157 minutes
- Country: India
- Language: Telugu
- Box office: ₹67 crore (Note: (Esquire India, Cinema Express))

Lenin is a 2026 India Telugu-language action film written and directed by Murali Kishor Abburu, and jointly produced by Akkineni Nagarjuna and Suryadevara Naga Vamsi under the banners Manam Enterprises LLP and Sithara Entertainments, presented by Annapurna Studios. The film stars Akhil Akkineni in the titular role, Bhagyashri Borse and Pramod Panju, alongside Ramki and Sivaji, Sunil, Brahmaji, and Easwari Rao in supporting roles.

The film features an original score and soundtrack composed by Thaman S., with cinematography by Leon Britto and editing by Naveen Nooli. Lenin was theatrically released on 10 July 2026.

== Plot ==
The story begins in Year 1976 in Sriramapuram, introducing the Mahabharata's eighteen-day war, its eighteen parvas, and the eighteen-day festival dedicated to Draupadi known as Bharatam Metta, during which no blood is to be shed. On the festival's first day, the village's upper and lower factions argue over who should inaugurate the celebrations. The dispute ends when an unknown boy plants the ceremonial flag on the gopuram, officially beginning the festival. The boy, Lenin, is adopted by the village's most respected woman, Jayanthi, and grows up alongside her son, Vasanth, with the two becoming as close as brothers.

Several years later, the story shifts to a prison, where Lenin is released in Year 2001 after serving several years. He immediately visits the house of his foster uncle, Yatirajulu. Later, Lenin visits a bar with his dog, Kannayya, where he meets a young boy named Dilli. Curious about the man feared by the entire village and branded an outsider, Dilli asks Lenin about his past, prompting Lenin to recount his story.

Past: Several years earlier, during 1989 the first day of the festival, Lenin and the villagers clash with the henchmen of MLA Raghava Reddy. The MLA is publicly humiliated and swears revenge.

On the festival's third day, Lenin meets Bharathi, the younger daughter of Jayanthi's elder brother. After a series of encounters, the two fall in love. In the process, Bharathi bruises the ego of Damodaram, one of the MLA's henchmen. Damodaram conspires with Kotha Charuvu Tulasi to abduct and assault Bharathi. However, Lenin and Vasanth, who has just returned after completing his studies, defeat Tulasi and his men, rescuing Bharathi. Tulasi vows revenge. Later, Vasanth further humiliates Raghava Reddy by inviting him to the inauguration of his newly established hospital, only to deliberately ignore him, further fueling the MLA's resentment.

Jayanthi and Neelakantam decide to arrange Vasanth's marriage with Vaidehi, Neelakantam's elder daughter and Bharathi's sister. During one night of the festival, Jayanthi sees Vaidehi with another man, while Damodaram simultaneously taunts both Jayanthi and Yatirajulu. Yatirajulu, the illegitimate son of Jayanthi's father-in-law, has never been accepted as part of the family by Jayanthi or Vasanth, leaving him deeply insecure. His lifelong ambition is to become the festival's Dharmaraju, a highly revered position, but Jayanthi repeatedly denies him the opportunity. Despite this, Yatirajulu has a soft corner for Lenin. When Vaidehi is mysteriously murdered and Bharathi is subsequently arranged to marry Vasanth, Yatirajulu secretly plots to unite Lenin and Bharathi. It is eventually revealed that both Vaidehi and the man seen with her were murdered by Jayanthi's younger brother on Jayanthi's orders. On the eighteenth day of the festival, Bharathi refuses to marry Vasanth and publicly confesses her love for Lenin, who had previously sacrificed his feelings out of loyalty to Jayanthi and Vasanth. Instead of opposing them, Vasanth takes Bharathi to Lenin, allowing the couple to reunite. However, they are ambushed, and Vasanth is brutally stabbed. Lenin stays behind to fight while Bharathi rushes the injured Vasanth to the hospital.

Present: Returning to the present, Dilli asks Lenin who was responsible for the attack on Vasanth. Before revealing the answer, Lenin explains that everyone inside the bar is one of his enemies, gathered there according to his own plan. Among them are Tulasi, Damodaram, and several other rivals. Lenin then reveals that he has already brought the mastermind responsible by pulling a severed head from his bag. The head belongs to Yatirajulu, shocking everyone. Lenin declares war on those present but insists on finishing his story before the fight begins.

Past: The narrative returns to the past, revealing that Yatirajulu had discovered Jayanthi's role in Vaidehi's murder. He devises a plan to kill Vasanth and frame Jayanthi for Vaidehi's murder, believing that doing so would remove every obstacle preventing him from becoming the festival's Dharmaraju. He intends to murder Vasanth on the same day as his marriage to Bharathi. However, Bharathi's public confession of love and Lenin's unexpected involvement disrupt his plans. Lenin and Bharathi eventually marry with Neelakantam's blessing. Yatirajulu subsequently allies himself with Raghava Reddy, Tulasi, and Damodaram while planting a mole inside Vasanth's hospital. The mole tracks Vasanth's movements, allowing the conspirators to plan his assassination at a farm on a chosen night.

Meanwhile, Bharathi becomes pregnant. On the same night, Vasanth arrives at the farm and secretly strikes a deal with Raghava Reddy, Yatirajulu, Tulasi, and Damodaram. He promises not to interfere in the MLA's political influence over the village, agrees to grant Damodaram ownership of as much land as he can walk across in a single day, and vows to give Yatirajulu the recognition he has always desired. It is then revealed that Vasanth had desired Bharathi from the moment they first met and wanted to marry her instead of Vaidehi, although Vaidehi genuinely loved him. Vasanth had orchestrated Vaidehi's death by manipulating Jayanthi into approving the murder. Now consumed by resentment, he seeks revenge on Bharathi for rejecting him in favor of an unknown orphan.

The final ritual of Bharatam Metta is delayed as Vasanth intends to destroy Bharathi during the very festival in which she rejected him. Once the ritual begins, Vasanth abandons all pretense and systematically murders Lenin's friends. Eventually, only Murali remains. Through the mole, Lenin learns that Vasanth is behind the conspiracy. Vasanth challenges Lenin to save both Murali and Bharathi. Lenin arrives in time but is betrayed by Murali, who had been blackmailed after his wife was held at knifepoint. Murali throws a chemical into Lenin's eyes, partially blinding him. Vasanth, accompanied by Tulasi and the MLA's men, provokes Lenin into attacking him. Exploiting Lenin's impaired vision, Vasanth tricks him into fatally stabbing a gagged Bharathi instead. Bharathi dies in Lenin's arms, and Lenin is imprisoned for her murder.

Present: Back in the present, Lenin tells Dilli that two people died that day: Bharathi and Murali, who was Dilli's father. Dilli had originally intended to kill Lenin in revenge for his father's death, but after learning the truth, he changes his mind. Lenin asks the bartender to escort the children out before beginning his battle against his enemies. Lenin kills most of the men inside the bar. Meanwhile, Parthasaradhi, the jailer who arranged Lenin's early release, arrives at Yatirajulu's house and discovers his headless body. When one of the constables questions how Lenin could have killed the man who raised him, Parthasaradhi reveals that Lenin is completely blind. The chemical used by Murali eventually caused Lenin to lose his eyesight permanently during his imprisonment. Lenin refused medical treatment because he no longer wished to see a world without Bharathi.

As Tulasi and the others realize Lenin's condition, Jayanthi confronts Vasanth and reveals that she was the one who begged Parthasaradhi to release Lenin because the village had fallen into chaos after his imprisonment. Following a heated argument, Jayanthi declares that Vasanth deserves to die at Lenin's hands. Vasanth heads to the bar for a final confrontation. During the ensuing fight, Lenin is inspired by a vision of the deceased Bharathi and kills Tulasi along with the remaining henchmen before facing Vasanth. Lenin repeatedly stabs Vasanth, who begs for mercy. Lenin tells him that he bears no personal hatred toward him, but that his love for Bharathi compelled everything he has done, before killing him. The villagers, led by Jayanthi, arrive and carry away the mortally wounded Lenin. The story concludes with Parthasaradhi narrating that, according to the Mahabharata, Dharmaraja and a dog were the only survivors at the end of the journey, implying that only Lenin and Kannayya survive the entire conflict.

== Cast ==
- Akhil Akkineni as Lenin, the titular protagonist, Bharathi's husband, Vasanth's foster brother
- Bhagyashri Borse as Bharathi, Lenin's wife and Vasanth's cousin
- Pramod Panju as Vasanth, Lenin's foster brother and the main antagonist, who lusts Bharathi
- Ramesh Indira as MLA Raghava Reddy
- Easwari Rao as Jayanthi "Jayanthamma", Vasanth's mother and Lenin’s adoptive mother
- Ramki as Neelakantam, Bharathi and Vaidehi's father
- Sivaji as Ethirajulu, Vasanth's uncle
- Sunil as Parthasaradhi IPS
- Brahmaji as Damodaram
- Ravi Mariya as Chitti Babu
- Getup Srinu as Murali
- Saranya Pradeep as Murali's wife
- Shravani Reddy as Vaidehi, Bharathi’s elder sister
- Shatru as Kotha Charuvu Tulasi
- Praveen as Dwaraka, Lenin's friend
- Lakshman Tekumudi as Srinivasulu, Lenin’s friend
- Gopi Gavireddy as Balaji, Lenin’s friend
- Pavani Karanam as Sulochana, Bharathi's best friend
- Bhanu Prakash as Dilli, Murali’s son
- Rohan Surya Kanuma as Munishekar, Vaidehi’s love-interest
- Shanmukh as Raghava Reddy’s assistant
- Mahesh Achanta as Damodaram’s sidekick
- Srinivas Vadlamani as Jayanthi’s brother
- Ravi Teja Nannimala as Jailor
- Posani Krishna Murali as MLA Mukkamala Krishna
- Rajeev Kanakala as Nagamani, Vasanth’s father

== Production ==
The film was written and directed by Murali Kishor Abburu. The titular role is played by Akhil Akkineni. Actress Sreeleela was initially cast as the female lead but exited the project and was replaced by Bhagyashri Borse. Sivaji, Sunil, and Brahmaji were also cast in main roles. The cinematographer was Leon Britto.

== Music ==
Lenin

Soundtrack album by Thaman S
- Released: 24 June 2026
- Recorded: 2025–26
- Studios: Studio Uno Records, Chennai
- Genre: Feature film soundtrack
- Language: Telugu
- Label: T-Series Telugu
- Producer: Thaman S

Thaman S chronology
Ustaad Bhagat Singh (2026)	Lenin (2026)	Idhayam Murali (2026)

Singles from Lenin
- 1. "Vaarevaa Vaarevaa" Released: 05 January 2026; 2. "Yetta Yetta" Released: 16 April 2026; 3. "Soul of Lenin" Released: 05 June 2026; 4. "Jaya Mangalam" Released: 05 July 2026; 5. "Raavanaa Sandanaala"

The music was composed by Thaman S., marking his first collaboration with director Murali Kishor Abburu and third with Akhil after Akhil (2015) and Mr. Majnu (2019). The audio rights were acquired by T-Series. The lyrics were written by Ramajogayya Sastry, Bhaskarabatla, and Anantha Sriram. The first single, "Vaarevaa Vaarevaa", was released on 05 January 2026, before Sankranthi. The full video of the second single, "Yetta Yetta", was released on 16 April 2026. The promotional video and third single, "Soul of Lenin", was released on 05 June 2026.

== Release ==
=== Theatrical ===
Lenin was theatrically released on 10 July 2026.

The film faced multiple production and scheduling delays prior to its final release announcement. It was originally slated for a theatrical release on 1 May 2026; however, it was deferred to avoid a box office clash with Ram Charan's film Peddi. It was subsequently rescheduled for 26 June 2026, before being pushed back one final time to July to allow the post-production and visual effects teams more time to finalize the project.

=== Distribution ===
Annapurna Studios released the film in the Nizam region, while Naga Vamsi independently released it in Andhra Pradesh through its distributor. This film was distributed in the United States by Shloka Entertainments.

=== Home media ===
The post theatrical streaming rights of Lenin were acquired by ZEE5. It started streaming on 7 August 2026.

== Reception ==
=== Box office ===
The film grossed approximately ₹7 crore rupees in Telugu-speaking regions on its opening day, with Karnataka contributing about ₹65 lakh rupees and overseas markets contributing nearly ₹2 crore rupees, bringing its global opening day gross to approximately ₹10 crore rupees. The film grossed over ₹61 Crore in its first three days of release. Ultimately, the film's total box office reached ₹67 crore.

=== Critical response ===
Sangeetha Devi Dundoo of The Hindu said that "In Lenin, Akhil does display marked growth as an actor. But a fresher script — one that did not fall back on the mass-action template — might have brought something new to the table." T. Naga Maruthi Acharya of the India Today said that "Murali Kishor Abburu deserves appreciation for attempting a story that is more ambitious than the average commercial entertainer. But ambition alone cannot carry a film. In the end, the missed opportunities linger far longer than the moments that actually work." Yashaswini Sri of The Indian Express said that "Lenin is a rooted, intense rural drama. For those willing to sit with a slow-building story about friendship, loyalty, and love turning into conflict, it largely delivers, anchored by a career-best performance from Akhil Akkineni." Sruthi Ganapati Raman of The Hollywood Reporter India gave the film a mixed review calling it a "shopworn revenge drama" that suffer from a barrage of twists and loose emotional groundwork, though she praised the lead performances of Akhil Akkineni and Bhagyashri Borse as well as its mythological parallels to Mahabharata.
