= Daggubati =

Daggubati is a Telugu surname that may refer to

- Daggubati Purandeswari, Indian politician, wife of Daggubati Venkateshwara Rao
- Daggubati Venkateswara Rao, member of the Indian National Congress
- D. Ramanaidu (Daggubati Ramanaidu, 1936–2015), Indian film producer
- Daggubati Suresh Babu, Telugu film producer and managing director of Suresh Productions
- Daggubati Venkatesh, Indian film actor
- Rana Daggubati, Indian film actor, producer, visual effects coordinator and photographer

== See also ==
- Daggubati-Akkineni family
