= Sushanth =

Indian actor (born 1986)

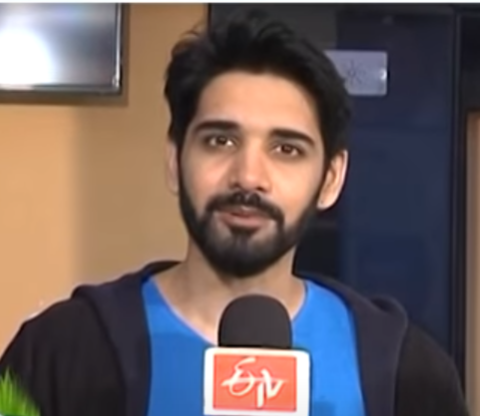
- Sushanth in 2018
- Born: Sushanth Anumolu; 18 March 1986 (age 40); Hyderabad, Andhra Pradesh (now in Telangana), India
- Education: University of Illinois, Urbana-Champaign (B.S.)
- Occupation: Actor
- Years active: 2008–present
- Family: Daggubati–Akkineni family

Sushanth Anumolu (born 18 March 1986), known professionally as Sushanth, is an Indian actor who works in Telugu films. Born into the Akkineni–Daggubati family, he made his acting debut with Kalidasu (2008).

After a series of box office failures, Sushanth achieved success with his portrayal of a software employee in Chi La Sow (2018). His highest-grossing release came with Ala Vaikunthapurramuloo (2020). He made his web debut with Maa Neella Tank (2022).

== Early life and background ==
Sushanth was born as Sushanth Anumolu on 18 March 1986 in Hyderabad. He is the son of Anumolu Sathya Bhushana Rao and Naga Susheela Akkineni. He is the grandson of Akkineni Nageswara Rao and the nephew of Nagarjuna. Actors Sumanth, Naga Chaitanya and Akhil Akkineni are his cousins.

Sushanth completed his schooling from Hyderabad Public School and completed his bachelor's degree in Electrical and Computer Engineering, from University of Illinois, Urbana-Champaign. He worked at United Technologies and Schlumberger as an Electrical Engineer before his acting career. Sushanth attended the Kreating Charakters Training School, Mumbai for a short acting course along with his cousin Naga Chaitanya.

== Career ==
=== Debut and early career (2008–2019) ===
Sushanth made his film debut in 2008 with the romantic drama Kalidasu, co‑starring Tamannaah. Critics at Telugucinema.com observed that “Sushanth makes a decent debut” and suggested he could “become a good actor by honing his skills further.” The film performed well at the box office.

After a three‑year hiatus, Sushanth returned in 2013’s ensemble thriller Adda, portraying a man who sows discord between couples, opposite Shanvi Srivastava.

He made a cameo appearance in the 2015 comedy thriller Dongaata.

In 2016, he starred as an NRI opposite Sonam Bajwa in the family drama Aatadukundam Raa. However, The New Indian Express criticized his performance as “exaggerated” and noted that “at no point do you feel like rooting for him.”

Sushanth’s breakthrough came in 2018 with the romantic comedy Chi La Sow, in which he played an unwilling bachelor opposite Ruhani Sharma. The film was both a critical and commercial success. India Today praised his performance, writing that he “finally got his break in the industry,” and the Deccan Chronicle noted, “Sushanth delivers a subtle, apt performance and proves he can truly act.”

=== Career progression (2020–present) ===
In 2020, Sushanth appeared as a young businessman in the ensemble cast film Ala Vaikunthapurramuloo, starring opposite Nivetha Pethuraj. The film became one of the highest-grossing Telugu films of all time and was among the top-grossing Indian films of 2020. However, Hindustan Times commented, "Sushant is wasted in a role that has no importance and it barely makes any impact."

In 2021, he played the role of an architect in Ichata Vahanamulu Niluparadu, opposite Meenakshi Chaudhary. Pinkvilla noted, "Sushanth's character acquires a gravitas of its own in the pre-climax and climax." Times of India stated, "Sushanth is decent as Arun but it’s not his best work."

In 2022, Sushanth made his web series debut with the ZEE5 original Maa Neella Tank, where he played a sub-inspector opposite Priya Anand. According to the Times of India, "Sushanth presented a different shade in his acting, portraying the character of a police inspector."

Sushanth is set to appear alongside Ravi Teja in the upcoming film Ravanasura, scheduled for release in April 2023.

== Filmography ==
=== Films ===
Key
†	Denotes films that have not yet been released

Year	Title	Role	Notes	Ref.
2008	Kalidasu	Kalidasu		
2009	Current	Sushanth		
2013	Adda	Abhi		
2015	Dongaata	Himself	Special appearances in song "Break Up Antu"	
2016	Aatadukundam Raa	Karthik		
2018	Chi La Sow	Arjun		
2020	Ala Vaikunthapurramuloo	Raj Manohar		
2021	Ichata Vahanamulu Niluparadu	Arun		
2023	Ravanasura	Saketh		
2023	Bhola Shankar	Srikar		

=== Web series ===
Year	Title	Role	Notes	Ref.
2022	Maa Neella Tank	Vamsi		

== Awards and nominations ==
Year	Award	Category	Film	Result	Ref.
2021	20th Santosham Film Awards	Best Supporting Actor	Ala Vaikunthapurramuloo	Won	
