= SIIMA Award for Best Female Debut – Telugu =

Telugu film female debut award

- Description: Best Debut Performance by an Actress in a Leading Role in Telugu cinema
- Country: India
- Presented by: Vibri Media Group
- First award: 21 June 2012 (for films released in 2011)
- Most recent winner: Sridevi Apalla, Court: State vs a Nobody (2025)

SIIMA Award for Best Female Debut – Telugu is presented by Vibri media group as part of its annual South Indian International Movie Awards, for the best acting done by a female actor in a leading role in her debut Telugu film. The award was first given in 2012 for films released in 2011.

== Superlatives ==
Categories	Recipient	Notes
Youngest winner	Avika Gor	Age 17 (3rd SIIMA)
Oldest winner	Vaishnavi Chaitanya	Age 31 (12th SIIMA)

- Shruti Haasan is the only actress to have also won the SIIMA Award for Best Actress – Telugu. She won the award thrice.
- Mrunal Thakur is the only actress to have won the SIIMA Critics Award for Best Actress – Telugu. She won the award for the same film in the same year, Sita Ramam.

== Winners and nominees ==
=== 2010s ===
Year	Actress	Film	Ref.
2011 (1st)	Shruti Haasan	Anaganaga O Dheerudu	
2011 (1st)	Nithya Menen	Ala Modalaindi	
2011 (1st)	Isha Chawla	Prema Kavali	
2011 (1st)	Amala Paul	Bejawada	
2011 (1st)	Nikitha Narayan	It's My Love Story	
2011 (1st)	Sarah-Jane Dias	Panjaa	
2012 (2nd)	Regena Cassandrra	Siva Manasulo Sruthi	
2012 (2nd)	Lavanya Tripathi	Andala Rakshasi	
2012 (2nd)	Reshma Rathore	Ee Rojullo	
2012 (2nd)	Gurshagun Kaur Sachdeva	Life Is Beautiful	
2012 (2nd)	Monal Gajjar	Sudigadu	
2013 (3rd)
2013 (3rd)	Avika Gor	Uyyala Jampala	
2013 (3rd)	Catherine Tresa	Chammak Challo	
2013 (3rd)	Isha Talwar	Gunde Jaari Gallanthayyinde	
2013 (3rd)	Sharmila Mandre	Kevvu Keka	
2013 (3rd)	Priya Banerjee	Kiss	
2014 (4th)
2014 (4th)	Raashi Khanna	Oohalu Gusagusalade	
2014 (4th)	Kriti Sanon	1: Nenokkadine	
2014 (4th)	Mishti Chakraborty	Chinnadana Nee Kosam	
2014 (4th)	Adah Sharma	Heart Attack	
2014 (4th)	Pooja Hegde	Oka Laila Kosam	
2015 (5th)
2015 (5th)	Pragya Jaiswal	Kanche	
2015 (5th)	Malvika Nair	Yevade Subramanyam	
2015 (5th)	Shruti Sodhi	Pataas	
2015 (5th)	Tridha Choudhury	Surya vs Surya	
2015 (5th)	Sayyeshaa	Akhil	
2016 (6th)
2016 (6th)	Nivetha Thomas	Gentleman	
2016 (6th)	Keerthy Suresh	Nenu Sailaja	
2016 (6th)	Mehreen Pirzada	Krishna Gaadi Veera Prema Gaadha	
2016 (6th)	Niharika Konidela	Oka Manasu	
2016 (6th)	Anu Emmanuel	Majnu	
2017 (7th)
2017 (7th)	Kalyani Priyadarshan	Hello	
2017 (7th)	Aakanksha Singh	Malli Raava	
2017 (7th)	Megha Akash	Lie	
2017 (7th)	Nivetha Pethuraj	Mental Madhilo	
2017 (7th)	Shalini Pandey	Arjun Reddy	
2018 (8th)
2018 (8th)	Payal Rajput	RX 100	
2018 (8th)	Ashima Narwal	Natakam	
2018 (8th)	Kiara Advani	Bharat Ane Nenu	
2018 (8th)	Nidhhi Agerwal	Savyasachi	
2018 (8th)	Ruhani Sharma	Chi La Sow	
2018 (8th)	Nabha Natesh	Nannu Dochukunduvate	
2019 (9th)
2019 (9th)	Shivathmika Rajashekar	Dorasaani	
2019 (9th)	Priyanka Mohan	Nani's Gang Leader	
2019 (9th)	Anagha	Guna 369	
2019 (9th)	Divyansha Kaushik	Majili	
2019 (9th)	Ananya Nagalla	Mallesham	

=== 2020s ===
Year	Actress	Film	Ref.
2020 (9th)	Roopa Koduvayur	Uma Maheswara Ugra Roopasya	
2020 (9th)	Varsha Bollamma	Choosi Choodangaane	
2020 (9th)	Noorin Shereef	Oollalla Oollalla	
2020 (9th)	Salony Luthra	Bhanumathi & Ramakrishna	
2020 (9th)	Priyanka Sharma	Savaari	
2021 (10th)
2021 (10th)	Krithi Shetty	Uppena	
2021 (10th)	Sreeleela	Pelli SandaD	
2021 (10th)	Meenakshi Chaudhary	Ichata Vahanamulu Niluparadu	
2021 (10th)	Faria Abdullah	Jathi Ratnalu	
2021 (10th)	Sandhya Raju	Natyam	
2022 (11th)
2022 (11th)	Mrunal Thakur	Sita Ramam	
2022 (11th)	Saiee Manjrekar	Ghani	
2022 (11th)	Mithila Palkar	Ori Devuda	
2022 (11th)	Shirley Setia	Krishna Vrinda Vihari	
2022 (11th)	Ritika Nayak	Ashoka Vanamlo Arjuna Kalyanam	
2023 (12th)
2023 (12th)	Vaishnavi Chaitanya	Baby	
2023 (12th)	Gayatri Bhardwaj	Tiger Nageswara Rao	
2023 (12th)	Iswarya Menon	Spy	
2023 (12th)	Pragathi Srivatsava	Peddha Kapu 1	
2023 (12th)	Sakshi Vaidya	Gandeevadhari Arjuna	
2023 (12th)	Yukti Thareja	Rangabali	
2024 (13th)	Bhagyashri Borse	Mr. Bachchan	
2024 (13th)	Janhvi Kapoor	Devara: Part 1	
2024 (13th)	Manushi Chhillar	Operation Valentine	
2024 (13th)	Nayan Sarika	Aay	
2024 (13th)	Pankhuri Gidwani	Love Mouli	
2025 (14th)	Sridevi Apalla	Court: State vs a Nobody	
2025 (14th)	Sakkshi Mhadolkar	Mowgli	
2025 (14th)	Preethi Pagadala	Patang	
2025 (14th)	Malavika Manoj	Oh Bhama Ayyo Rama	
2025 (14th)	Virti Vaghani	Sundarakanda	

== See also ==
- SIIMA Award for Best Actress – Telugu
- SIIMA Critics Award for Best Actress – Telugu
