= Sakshi Vaidya =

Indian actress (born 2000)

- Born: Thane, Maharashtra, India
- Occupation: Actress
- Years active: 2023–present

Sakshi Vaidya (born 19 June 2000) is an Indian actress who works in Telugu films & Tamil films. She made her debut with Agent (2023), and went on to appear in Gandeevadhari Arjuna (2023) and Nari Nari Naduma Murari (2026).

== Early life ==
Sakshi Vaidya was born on 19 June 2000, in Thane, Maharashtra, India. She is a physiotherapist by profession but quit to pursue a career in acting.

== Career ==
Vaidya made her debut in Telugu cinema opposite Akhil Akkineni in the spy action film Agent (2023), directed by Surender Reddy. However, the film received negative reviews from critics, and bombed at the box office. Writing about her performance, Neeshitha Nyayapati of The Times of India, stated, "Sakshi looks adorable and acts fine, it’s a shame she doesn’t get much to do." The same year, she appeared in the action film Gandeevadhari Arjuna, which also failed at the box office. Writing for The Hindu, Sangeetha Devi opined that Vaidya had a credible screen presence and carried her part in the film with poise. She was nominated for SIIMA Award for Best Female Debut – Telugu for this film.

In 2025, Vaidya made her debut in Malayalam cinema with Haal, which released following a prolonged legal battle with Central Board of Film Certification.

In 2026, she appeared in the comedy drama Nari Nari Naduma Murari, alongside Sharwanand and Samyuktha. The film was successful and gave Vaidya her first success. Suresh Kavirayani of Cinema Express stated, "Sakshi Vaidya gets a well-defined role and handles it with charm, bringing both vulnerability and spunk to [her role]." In 2026, she join Luv Ranjan's Pehla Pyaar Doosri Baar marks her Bollywood debut.

== Filmography ==
List of appearances, with year, title, and role shown
Year	Title	Role	Language	Notes	Ref.
2023	Agent	Vidya	Telugu		
2023	Gandeevadhari Arjuna	Ira	Telugu	Nominated–SIIMA Award for Best Female Debut – Telugu	
2025	Haal	Mariya Fernandez	Malayalam		
2026	Nari Nari Naduma Murari	Vedula Nithya	Telugu		
2026	Con City	Aishu	Tamil		
2026	Pehla Pyaar Doosri Baar		Hindi		
