= Hello (2017 film) =

2017 film by Vikram Kumar

- Theatrical release poster
- Directed by: Vikram Kumar
- Written by: Vikram Kumar
- Produced by: Akkineni Nagarjuna
- Starring: Akhil Akkineni; Kalyani Priyadarshan; Jagapati Babu; Ramya Krishna
- Cinematography: P. S. Vinod
- Edited by: Prawin Pudi
- Music by: Anup Rubens
- Production companies: Annapurna Studios; Manam Enterprises
- Release date: 22 December 2017
- Running time: 122 minutes
- Country: India
- Language: Telugu
- Budget: ₹300 million
- Box office: est. ₹340 million

Hello! is a 2017 Indian Telugu-language romantic action film directed by Vikram Kumar and produced by Akkineni Nagarjuna under Annapurna Studios. The film stars Akhil Akkineni, Kalyani Priyadarshan, Jagapati Babu and Ramya Krishnan. This film marks Kalyani Priyadarshan's film debut. The music is composed by Anup Rubens. Hello was released on 22 December 2017.

== Plot ==
Seenu is a young orphan who plays an Ektara and earns money. He meets Junnu at a Pani Puri stall. Seenu is captivated by Junnu's quirky nature. Junnu is touched when Seenu creates an original tune upon her request, and they become friends. They meet every day and play around the Indravati Park near Ramakrishna Signal. While going to school every day, she gives him a ₹100 note without revealing her identity. Seenu gifts her a set of bangles. However, their friendship is abruptly disrupted when Junnu's father is transferred to Delhi. Before parting ways, Junnu writes her phone number on a ₹100 note and gives it to Seenu, but a thief named Pandu steals the note. Seenu chases after the thief but gets hit by a car driven by Sarojini. Sarojini and her husband Prakash adopt Seenu after he survives the accident, thus fulfilling Sarojini's promise to do something good for him. Noticing their sadness, their respective parents ask them, and they reveal their feelings for each other. With the park being demolished, Junnu's father and Prakash are unable to locate Seenu and Junnu's address, respectively. Seenu continues to jog around the area daily in the hope of meeting Junnu again. Junnu makes a single bangle out of the set of bangles.

14 years later, Seenu is now known as Avinash, and Junnu goes by the name of Priya. They lead affluent lives but feel a sense of emptiness without each other. After a chance call from an Uber driver, Avinash discovers Priya's whereabouts. However, Pandu, this time, steals Avinash's phone, hindering his efforts to contact Junnu. Determined to reconcile with her, Avinash embarks on a mission to retrieve his stolen phone.

Past: Priya feels sad in Delhi and longs to meet Seenu when she discovers that her father is being transferred to the United States. Before leaving for the US, Priya decides to search for Seenu in Hyderabad while attending her friend Kavita's wedding. While picking up his mother from the airport, Avinash and Priya notice each other but fail to recognize each other. They become friends when Priya generously gives ₹100 to street children. Priya met Sarojini on the flight she came, and Sarojini hopes Priya will be her daughter-in-law. Priya invites him to Kavita's wedding. Sarojini and Prakash mention how Avinash is not going for his jog after Priya's arrival and has forgotten Junnu. Avinash now avoids contacting Priya. At the wedding, Priya runs away after being overwhelmed by memories of Seenu. Avinash follows her and accidentally breaks the bangle that Seenu had gifted her.

Present: Avinash successfully retrieves his phone from the phone mafia and learns that Junnu is at Rockfort Music festival. Avinash encounters Priya at the festival, where they forgive each other and Avinash presents her with a new bangle and leaves. Determined to find Junnu, Avinash goes to a music stall and starts playing the tune he had created during their childhood on a violin. Upon hearing the tune, Priya frantically searches for him but fails to locate him. Avinash discovers the ₹100 note with Junnu's phone number on it and repeatedly dials the number, but Priya keeps cutting the call as she is also trying to locate the tune player at the festival. Avinash plays the tune one final time and Priya rushes around in search of the musician. Overwhelmed by seeing Priya's desperate expression, Avinash softly utters Junnu, where she responds with a "yes" gesture and they embrace each other passionately.

== Cast ==
- Akhil Akkineni as Avinash alias Seenu
  - Mikhail Gandhi as Young Seenu
- Kalyani Priyadarshan as Priya alias Junnu
  - Myrah Dandekar as Young Junnu
- Jagapati Babu as Prakash, Avinash's adoptive father
- Ramya Krishna as Sarojini "Saru", Avinash's adoptive mother
- Ajay as Rishi
- Satya Krishnan as Priya's mother
- Anish Kuruvilla as Priya's father
- Vennela Kishore as Kavita's fiance
- Posani Krishna Murali as Police Officer
- Nivedhithaa Sathish as Kavita, Priya's friend
- Praveen as a taxi driver
- Krishnudu as a Pani Puri vendor
- Raghu Master as musical instrument vendor (cameo appearance)

== Soundtrack ==
Hello

Soundtrack album by Anup Rubens
- Released: 7 December 2017
- Recorded: 2017
- Genre: Soundtrack
- Length: 29:48
- Label: Aditya Music
- Producer: Anup Rubens

Anup Rubens chronology
Paisa Vasool (2017)	Hello (2017)	Oo Pe Ku Ha (2017)

Music of the movie was composed by Anup Rubens. Music released on Aditya Music. The audio function was held at Visakhapatnam on 7 December 2017. The film is Anup Rubens's 50th film.

Telugu Original Track-List
No.	Title	Lyrics	Singer(s)	Length
1.	"Hello"	Vanamali, Shreshta	Armaan Malik	3:33
2.	"Anaganaga Oka Uru"	Chandrabose	Sri Dhruthi	5:29
3.	"Thalachi Thalachi"	Vanamali	Haricharan	5:20
4.	"Yevevo"	Chandrabose	Akhil Akkineni, Jonita Gandhi	4:53
5.	"Anaganaga Oka Uru" (Female)	Chandrabose	Shreya Ghoshal	4:52
6.	"Merise Merise"	Vanamali	Haricharan, Srinidhi	5:20
Total length:				29:48

All lyrics are written by Prashanth Ingole.

Taqdeer (Hindi Dubbed) Tracklist
No.	Title	Singer(s)	Length
1.	"Hello"	Asa Singh	3:23
2.	"Barse Barse"	Shreyas Puranik, Deepali Sathe	5:10
3.	"Ik Aisa"	Jai Lakshmi	2:37
4.	"Tarse Tarse"	Asa Singh	3:14
5.	"Kitne The"	Asa Singh, Deepali Sathe	4:17
6.	"Rap song"	Jay Mehta

Hello (Tamil Dubbed) Tracklist
No.	Title	Length
1.	"Hello"	3:23
2.	"Azha Azhagai Oru Ooril"	2:46
3.	"Nenachi Nenachi"	5:28
4.	"Yedhedho"	5:42
5.	"Yedhedho (Female version)"	1:10
6.	"Minal Minal"	5:07

== Release ==
The film was released worldwide on 22 December 2017. It was later dubbed into Hindi under the title Taqdeer (transl. Destiny) and premiered on Star Gold on 23 June 2018. It was dubbed into Tamil with the same title and premiered in Star Vijay, and in Malayalam with the same title in 2019.

== Box office ==
The film grossed ₹264 million (equivalent to ₹400 million or US$4.2 million in 2026) worldwide in four days, with a distributors share of ₹143.8 million (US$1.5 million). In Andhra Pradesh and Telangana, the four-day gross was ₹157.5 million (US$1.6 million), with a share of ₹101 million (US$1.0 million). Hello grossed ₹340 million (US$3.5 million) in its first week.

== Legal issues ==
An individual from Jharkhand claimed that the phone number used in the film as Junnu's number, which was shown throughout the film, belonged to him and that he had been receiving several calls from fans. He alleged that his personal and professional life was impacted because of the calls and had claimed a compensation of ₹5 million (US$52,000). The makers of the film insisted that they attained due permission from the respective telecom company. However, the company denied the claims and said that no such permission was granted.

== Accolades ==
=== 65th Filmfare Awards South ===
- Won – Filmfare Award for Best Female Debut – South – Kalyani Priyadarshan
- Nominated – Filmfare Award for Best Music Director – Telugu – Anoop Rubens
- Nominated – Filmfare Award for Best Male Playback Singer – Telugu – Armaan Malik – "Hello"

=== 7th South Indian International Movie Awards ===
- Won – SIIMA Award for Best Female Debut (Telugu) – Kalyani Priyadarshan
- Nominated – SIIMA Award for Best Male Playback Singer (Telugu) – Armaan Malik – "Hello"
