= Ramapuram, Krishna district =

Ramapuram
- Village
- Interactive map of Ramapuram
- Location in Andhra Pradesh, India
- Coordinates: 16.50°N 80.986°E
- Country: India
- State: Andhra Pradesh
- District: Krishna

Population (2011)
  - Total: 602

Languages
  - Official: Telugu
- Time zone: UTC+5:30 (IST)
- PIN: 521321
- Vehicle registration: AP
- Gudivada: Gudivada

Ramapuram is a village in Krishna district, Andhra Pradesh, India. It is located in Nandivada mandal. It is famous for being the birthplace of veteran Telugu actor Akkineni Nageswara Rao.
