= Agent (film) =

2023 Indian Telugu-language film

- Official release poster
- Directed by: Surender Reddy
- Written by: Story: Vakkantham Vamsi; Screenplay: Surender Reddy
- Produced by: Anil Sunkara; Rambrahmam Sunkara
- Starring: Mammootty; Akhil Akkineni; Dino Morea; Sakshi Vaidya; Varalaxmi Sarathkumar; Vikramjeet Virk
- Cinematography: Rasool Ellore; George C. Williams (1 Song)
- Edited by: Naveen Nooli
- Music by: Hiphop Tamizha; Bheems Ceciroleo (1 Song)
- Production companies: AK Entertainments; Surender 2 Cinema
- Distributed by: Goldmines Telefilms; B4U Films
- Release date: 28 April 2023
- Running time: 156 minutes
- Country: India
- Language: Telugu
- Budget: ₹85 crore
- Box office: ₹13 crore

Agent is a 2023 Indian Telugu-language action thriller film directed by Surender Reddy, from a story by Vakkantham Vamsi, and produced by Anil Sunkara and Rambrahmam Sunkara under AK Entertainments. The film stars Mammootty and Akhil Akkineni in the lead roles alongside Dino Morea, Sakshi Vaidya, Varalaxmi Sarathkumar and Vikramjeet Virk in supporting roles. The film marks the debut of Vaidya and Morea in Telugu cinema.

The film was announced in September 2020. Filming took place in Hyderabad, Budapest, Visakhapatnam, Coimbatore and Manali. The release was deferred multiple times due to COVID-19 pandemic and production delays.

Agent was released on 28 April 2023 and received negative reviews from critics. The film became a big commercial disappointment at the box office amongst decent expectations, which prompted Sunkara and Akhil to apologize, accepting that the production commenced filming without a bound script.

== Plot ==
RAW chief Col. Mahadev alias Devil gets interrogated about orchestrating a mission to kill two terrorists. Mahadev reveals that the two terrorists were working under a private terrorist organization called The Syndicate, which is headed by Central Minister Jitendra Reddy and God.

Meanwhile, Ramakrishna "Ricky" alias Wild Saala is an aspiring youngster with an obsession to become a RAW agent, despite numerous unsatisfactory attempts. After seeing his capability, Mahadev assigns Ricky a risky mission to disguise himself as a rookie, infiltrate himself into Dharma's close circle and capture him. It is revealed that God is actually Dharma, an ex-RAW agent, who went rogue after Mahadev forced him to kill his girlfriend. Dharma now plans to spread a deadly virus dubbed Super Cells.

During a shootout with Mahadev, the device containing the virus is damaged and leads to a technical problem. Ricky kills Jitendra Reddy at the harbour and heads to Kashmir to learn about Dharma's other handler of the Syndicate, but the Kashmiri police arrest him and Mahadev denies him as an agent of the Indian government. Shortly after doing so, Ricky escapes from custody with Dharma's help. It is later revealed that Ricky's arrest was a ruse planned by Ricky and Mahadev to learn about Dharma's operations.

Meanwhile, the device containing the virus is fixed and a meeting is arranged to sell the device to the highest bidder, which Mahadev learns about from Ricky and assigns him to retrieve a copy of the device, which also consists the names and identities of all active RAW agents. Dharma finds out that Ricky is copying the device, upon which Dharma confronts Mahadev and forces him to shoot himself or Dharma would spread the virus worldwide through missiles.

Mahadev tells Ricky to shoot him, which Ricky reluctantly does. Ricky tracks down Dharma and kills him, while also stopping the missiles from releasing the virus in the country. During the credits, afterwards, Ricky secretly gets assigned a new mission dubbed Rabbit Fire.

== Cast ==
- Mammootty as RAW Chief Colonel Mahadev Menon "Mahadev" alias "The Devil" alias "Guruji", Ramakrishna's Godfather
- Akhil Akkineni as P. Ramakrishna "Ricky" alias "Wild Saala"
- Dino Morea as Dharma alias "The God"
- Sakshi Vaidya as Vidya, an aspiring pilot training officer in NASA
- Varalaxmi Sarathkumar as Shalini
- Vikramjeet Virk as Deva
- Sampath Raj as Jitendra Reddy
- Murali Sharma as P. Vittal Rao
- Posani Krishna Murali as K. Jayanth Kumar
- Denzil Smith as Abhijeet Mehta
- Tarun Arora as Parmarth
- Sangay Tsheltrim as Khalid
- Ravi Mariya as Chinna Babu
- Vincent Asokan as RAW officer
- Hareesh Peradi as Minister
- Anu Prabhakar as P. Lakshmi
- Rajeev Kanakala as Narayana
- Anish Kuruvilla as Ramesh (uncredited)
- Urvashi Rautela in a special appearance in the song "Wild Saala"

== Production ==
=== Development ===
The film was announced by Akhil Akkineni in September 2020, tentatively titled Akhil 5, with Surender Reddy as the director. It was officially launched on Akkineni's birthday in April 2021, revealing the title and posters. A pooja ceremony was held on the launch day.

=== Casting ===
Akkineni's role as a spy was reportedly inspired by the character of Jason Bourne from the American film series Bourne. Akkineni bulked up his body for the role. In December 2020, model Sakshi Vaidya was confirmed as the female lead. In March 2021, Mohanlal was approached for the role of a military officer. Subsequently, Upendra was also considered, but the role was ultimately signed by Mammootty, whose casting was confirmed in June 2021. It also marks the collaboration between Mammootty, Akkineni and Surender Reddy. Dino Morea was cast as the main antagonist, who plays a rogue agent.

=== Filming ===
Filming began in July 2021 in Hyderabad, India. Mammootty joined the production in October 2021 in Budapest and completed filming his portions. In March 2022, sequences featuring Akkineni were shot in Hyderabad Metro. The following month, the production moved to Visakhapatnam and shot a few actions episodes and a song at the Visakhapatnam Port. In April 2022, the production moved to Manali, Himachal Pradesh to shoot action sequences featuring Akkineni and others, under the choreographer of Vijay Master. As of May 2022, about 50–60% of the production has been completed due to delays in production, thus missing the August 2022 release.

== Music ==
Agent

Soundtrack album by Hiphop Tamizha
- Released: 2023
- Recorded: 2021–2023
- Studio: Annapurna Studios
- Genre: Feature film soundtrack
- Length: 13:46
- Language: Telugu
- Label: Lahari Music; T-Series
- Producer: Hiphop Tamizha

Hiphop Tamizha chronology
Anbarivu (2022)	Agent (2023)	Veeran (2023)

Singles from Agent
- 1. "Malli Malli" Released: 22 February 2023; 2. "Endhe Endhe" Released: 24 March 2023; 3. "Rama Krishna" Released: 14 March 2023; 4. "Wild Saala" Released: 14 March 2023

Earlier, Thaman S was chosen as the composer of the film's score and soundtrack. Later, in September 2021, he had been replaced by musical duo Hiphop Tamizha, marking their second collaboration with Surender Reddy after Dhruva (2016). The music rights of the film are owned by Lahari Music and T Series.

Track listing
No.	Title	Lyrics	Music	Singer(s)	Length
1.	"Malli Malli"	Aditya Iyengar	Hiphop Tamizha	Hiphop Tamizha	3:27
2.	"Endhe Endhe"	Chandrabose	Hiphop Tamizha	Padmalatha, Sanjith Hegde, Hiphop Tamizha	3:36
3.	"Rama Krishna"	Chandrabose	Hiphop Tamizha	Ram Miriyala	3:15
4.	"Wild Saala"	Raghuram	Bheems Ceciroleo	Sravana Bhargavi, Bheems Ceciroleo, Swathi Reddy, Amala Chebolu	3:28
Total length:					13:46

== Release ==
=== Theatrical ===
Agent was released on 28 April 2023. Initially, the film was initially scheduled for a release on 24 December 2021, but the film's production was heavily delayed due to the COVID-19 pandemic.

Later, the film was scheduled to release on 12 August 2022 but was delayed again due to production delays and Akkineni's injuries. The film was then planned for a January 2023 release, coinciding with Makara Sankranti before being postponed to the current date. The film is set to release in Telugu along with the dubbed versions in Malayalam. It was previously set to be release in five languages, but later it was set only to release the film in Telugu and Malayalam languages.

=== Home media ===
SonyLIV acquired the digital streaming rights of the film and began streaming from March 14, 2025 in Tamil, Telugu, Malayalam and Kannada languages.

== Reception ==
Agent was panned by critics and audiences for its action set pieces, bad direction, amateur editing, clumsy screenwriting, lack of originality, poor technical values, background score, bad script and poor usage of VFX.

=== Critical response ===
Srivathsan Nadadhur of OTTplay gave 3/5 stars and wrote "Agent is a largely engaging spy thriller with a sharp screenplay and fabulous action choreography filmed on a wide canvas. Despite its follies, Surender Reddy ensures a paisa vasool experience."

Neeshita Nyayapati of The Times of India rated the film 2/5 stars and wrote "Agent is a spy thriller that commits the blasphemy of being boring. Akhil’s ‘wild’ act might save the country but it's not enough to save the film." Latha Srinivasan of India Today gave 2/5 stars and wrote "There is hardly a semblance of a plausible story in Agent and what is truly wild is that the writer and director thought this would make a good film."

Raghu Bandi of The Indian Express gave 2/5 stars and wrote "Vakkantham Vamshi’s story follows a typical action film pattern and sticks to that. Somewhere between a huge Surender Reddy film and Akhil Akkineni film, Agent falters in truly belonging to either zone and ends up as an average action film." Abhilasha Cherukuri of Cinema Express gave 1.5/5 stars and wrote "There is a throwaway line comparing logic with magic somewhere in Agent, and the film falls short on both counts, leaving its viewer with a tedious and thoroughly unmemorable experience."

Bhuvanesh Chandar of The Hindu wrote "Surender Reddy’s ‘Agent,’ starring Akhil Akkineni and Mammootty, has a generic story that follows an annoying lead character who comes across as a man-child trying to live out his childhood spy fantasies." Ram Venkat Srikar of Film Companion wrote "Agent is a film in which the efforts of the team and resources pooled to realise the filmmaker's vision are evident. A couple of brief action sequences are the only respite in this colossal, hackneyed mess of a film that falls short of creativity and wildness."
