= Sisindri =

- Theatrical release poster
- Directed by: Siva Nageswara Rao
- Screenplay by: Siva Nageswara Rao; Marudhuri Raja (dialogues)
- Story by: Suryadevara Ram Mohan Rao
- Based on: Baby's Day Out by John Hughes
- Produced by: Nagarjuna
- Starring: Nagarjuna; Akhil Akkineni; Giribabu; Tanikella Bharani; Sudhakar
- Cinematography: S. Gopal Reddy
- Edited by: Shankar
- Music by: Raj
- Production company: Great India Entertainments
- Distributed by: Annapurna Studios
- Release date: 14 September 1995
- Running time: 151 minutes
- Country: India
- Language: Telugu

Sisindri is a 1995 Indian Telugu-language comedy film directed by Siva Nageswara Rao and produced by Nagarjuna. The film stars Nagarjuna's son Akhil Akkineni (in his debut). Nagarjuna Akkineni, Giri Babu, Tanikella Bharani, Sudhakar, Aamani, Sarath Babu and Subhalekha Sudhakar play supporting roles. Music is composed by Raj, his debut film. The film is inspired by the American film Baby's Day Out (1994).

Akhil Akkineni won Special Award For Best Child Actor at Filmfare Awards South. The film was dubbed in Tamil as Chutti Kuzhandhai.

== Synopsis ==
A rich industrialist Sarath Kumar finds that his cousin Shivaji has misused his company funds and dismisses him. To settle scores, Shivaji abducts his one-year-old baby Sisindri with the help of Jakkanna, Akkanna and Madanna which makes Sarath Kumar and his wife Geetha feel scared about him. But Sisindri turns out to be smarter than his abductors.

== Cast ==
- Nagarjuna Akkineni as Raja (car mechanic)
- Akhil Akkineni as Sisindri (the baby)
- Aamani as Geetha (Sisindri's mother)
- Sarath Babu as Sarath Kumar (Sisindri's father)
- Giri Babu as Jakkanna
- Tanikella Bharani as Akkanna
- Sudhakar as Madanna
- Brahmanandam as Jailor
- Babu Mohan as smuggler
- Kota Srinivasa Rao
- Ali
- AVS as house owner
- Dharmavarapu Subramanyam
- Subhalekha Sudhakar as Johnny
- Sivaji Raja as Sivaji
- Chalapathi Rao
- Subbaraya Sharma
- Ananth Babu
- Chitti Babu
- Gautam Raju as Sentry
- Kallu Chidambaram
- Chandra Mouli
- Jenny
- Tejasri
- Jayalalita as Jambavathi
- Y. Vijaya as Hostel Warden
- Tabu as in a cameo appearance as Tabu
- Pooja Batra in a cameo appearance as Pooja

== Production ==
Siva Nageswara Rao decided to direct a film based on the American film Baby's Day Out (1994). Nagarjuna's son Akhil who was a one year old baby at that time made his acting debut as a child kidnapped from home.

== Soundtrack ==
Sisindri

Soundtrack album by Raj
- Released: 1994
- Genre: Soundtrack
- Length: 25:47
- Label: Supreme Music
- Producer: Raj

Raj chronology
Sisindri (1994)	Ramudochadu (1996)

The music was composed by Raj. The lyrics written by Sirivennela Seetharama Sastry, released by the Supreme Music Company.

Track-List
No.	Title	Singer(s)	Length
1.	"Aataadukundaama"	S. P. Balasubrahmanyam, Chitra	5:11
2.	"Hello Pilla"	S. P. Balasubrahmanyam, Chitra, Suresh Peters	5:18
3.	"Chinni Tandri"	Swarnalatha	5:10
4.	"Ori Naayano"	Mano, Muralidhar, Kota Srinivasa Rao	4:47
5.	"Kya Scene Hai"	Mano, Anupama	5:08
Total length:			25:47

== Box office ==
This movie celebrated 100 days in 2 centers and 50 days in 34 centers.
