= Akkineni Nageswara Rao =

Indian actor and film producer (1923–2014)

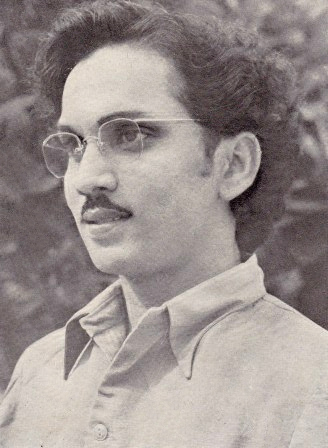
- Akkineni in 1951
- Born: 20 September 1923; Ramapuram, Madras Presidency, British India (present-day Ramapuram, Krishna district, Andhra Pradesh, India)
- Died: 22 January 2014 (aged 90); Hyderabad, Andhra Pradesh (now Telangana, India)
- Other name: ANR
- Occupations: Actor; film producer
- Years active: 1941–2014
- Works: Full list
- Spouse: Annapurna (m. 1949)
- Children: 5, including Nagarjuna Akkineni
- Relatives: Amala Akkineni (daughter-in-law) Naga Chaitanya (grandson) & Akhil Akkineni (grandson)
- Family: Akkineni–Daggubati family
- Awards: Padma Shri (1968); Padma Bhushan (1988); Dadasaheb Phalke Award (1990); Padma Vibhushan (2011)

Akkineni Nageswara Rao (20 September 1923 – 22 January 2014), known as ANR, was an Indian actor and film producer in Telugu cinema. Over his seven-decade career, he became a prominent figure in the industry, and is among the most influential actors of Indian cinema. Nageswara Rao received seven state Nandi Awards, five Filmfare Awards South and a Tamil Nadu State Film Award. He was honoured with the Dadasaheb Phalke Award, the highest recognition in Indian cinema, in 1990. Additionally, he was awarded the Padma Vibhushan (2011), Padma Bhushan (1988) and Padma Shri (1968), by the Government of India for his contributions to art and cinema.

Nageswara Rao's portrayals in biographical films include the Tamil saint Vipra Narayana in Vipra Narayana (1954), the Telugu poet Tenali Ramakrishna in Tenali Ramakrishna (1956), which received the All India Certificate of Merit for Best Feature Film, the Sanskrit poet Kalidasa in Mahakavi Kalidasu (1960), the 12th-century poet Jayadeva in Bhakta Jayadeva (1961), the legendary sculptor Jakanachari in Amarasilpi Jakkanna (1964), the Marathi saint Tukaram in Bhakta Tukaram (1971), the 15th-century mystic poet Kabir in Sri Ramadasu (2006), and the Sanskrit poet Valmiki in Sri Rama Rajyam (2009). He also portrayed mythological figures such as Lord Vishnu in Chenchu Lakshmi (1958), Narada in Bhookailas (1958), and Arjuna in Sri Krishnarjuna Yuddhamu (1963).

His performances in romantic dramas include Laila Majnu (1949), Devadasu (1953), Anarkali (1955), Batasari (1961), Mooga Manasulu (1964), Prema Nagar (1971), Premabhishekam (1981), and Meghasandesam (1982). He also starred in Balaraju (1948), Keelu Gurram (1949), Ardhangi (1955), Donga Ramudu (1955), Mangalya Balam (1958), Gundamma Katha (1962), Doctor Chakravarty (1964), Dharma Daata (1970), and Dasara Bullodu (1971).

He played a pivotal role in the relocation of the Telugu film industry from Madras to Hyderabad in the 1970s. To support the growing industry in Hyderabad, he established Annapurna Studios in 1976. Later, in 2011, he founded the Annapurna College of Film and Media within Annapurna Studios. His last film, Manam (2014), was released posthumously and was featured at the 45th International Film Festival of India in the Homage to ANR section. Nageswara Rao died on 22 January 2014, during the production of Manam.

== Early life and background ==
Akkineni Nageswara Rao was born into a lower-middle-class Telugu family on 20 September 1923 in Ramapuram, Krishna District, of present-day Andhra Pradesh. He was the youngest of five brothers. His parents Akkineni Venkataratnam Chowdary and Akkineni Punnamma, were from the farming community. His formal education was limited to primary schooling due to his parents' poor economic condition.

He began working in theatre at the age of 10. He became a stage actor, specialising in playing female characters, since women at that time were mostly prohibited from acting. His most famous roles were in notable dramas Harishchandra, Kanakatara, Vipranarayana, Telugu Talli, Aasajyoti and Satyanveshanam. The turning point of his career was when Ghantasala Balaramayya, a prominent film producer at that time, discovered him at the Vijayawada railway station. He was cast in the lead role of Rama in Sri Seeta Rama Jananam (1944). This was after his debut in a supporting role in the film Dharmapatni (1941).

== Career ==
He starred in over 255 films, spanning the Telugu, Tamil and Hindi languages. A majority of his films were both commercial and critical successes.

Though he is known for playing mythological figures such as Rama and Krishna, he was notably an atheist.

He is fondly called Natasamrat by his fans. In 1953, Akkineni played the titular role in Devadasu (1953), which is based on Sarat Chandra Chattopadhyay's novel of the same name. Deccan Herald reported that several critics had considered Rao's portrayal to be the best among all language versions. Navaratri (1966) made Akkineni the second actor after Sivaji Ganesan to play nine different roles in a film.

Akkineni is known for his romantic roles in films such as Laila Majnu (1949), Anarkali (1955), and Prema Nagar (1971). He also played several mythological characters in Mayabazar (1957), Mahakavi Kalidasu (1965), Bhakta Tukaram (1973), and Sri Ramadasu (2006).

Some of his many commercially successful films are Maya Bazaar, Samsaram, Bratuku Theruvu, Aradhana, Donga Ramudu, Dr. Chakravarthi, Ardhaangi, Mangalya Balam, Illarikam, Shantinivasam, Velugu Needalu, Dasara Bullodu, Bharya Bhartalu, Dharmadata, Batasari and College Bullodu. Sitaramayyagari Manavaralu was released in 1991, almost 50 years after his debut, and was a success at the box office.

== Philanthropy ==
Akkineni was very active in social service. Regarding the existence of God, he once said, "If there's a presence there, I'm sure he'll want us to perform our earthly duties well and be a good human being rather than blindly worship him".

Akkineni set up the Akkineni Janmabhoomi trust under the Janmabhoomi programme to foster development in his home town, Ramapuram. He was instrumental in the construction of the Akkineni Varadhi (a bridge named after him), which improved his village's economy by facilitating easy connectivity. In Ramapuram, Akkineni contributed towards the construction of a water filtration plant.

He instituted the Akkineni International Foundation in 2005 to honour those who contributed to the Film Industry. The Annapurna College of Film and Media, founded by his family in 2011, was set up as a non-profit entity. Rao donated to educational institutions since the beginning of his career and created scholarships at GITAM University (Vizag). He was the Chief Donor and President of Akkineni Nageswara Rao College, which was named after him. Rao was a Life member of the board and an adviser to the Department of Dramatics and Theatre Arts of Andhra University. He instituted gold medals for students who excelled in Acting and Direction. In 2012, he instituted the Akkineni Annapurna Educational Trust in memory of his wife Annapurna.

== Personal life ==
Akkineni married Annapurna on 18 February 1949. Annapurna Studios (established 1975) is named after her, and she was also credited as a presenter for several of the studio's productions. Annapurna died in 2011 after a prolonged illness. The couple had five children: Sathyavathi, Venkat Rathnam, who is a producer, Naga Susheeila, Saroja and Nagarjuna Akkineni, who is an actor and producer.

Akkineni has five grandsons and four granddaughters. While, Sumanth, Supriya Yarlagadda, Naga Chaitanya, Sushanth and Akhil Akkineni are all actors, Annapurna and Adhithya do not work in the film industry.

== Death ==
On 19 October 2013, Akkineni was diagnosed with stomach cancer. He continued shooting for his final film Manam two weeks after a major laparoscopic surgery, which some doctors feared he would not survive. His last public appearance was at the foundation day celebrations of Annapurna Studios on 14 January 2014. Akkineni died a week later, on 22 January 2014. He was cremated on 23 January 2014, at Annapurna Studios with full state honours amid a 21-gun salute. Thousands were present to pay their last respects.

== Awards and recognitions ==
=== Civilian Honors ===
Year	Award	Ref.
1968	Padma Shri	
1988	Padma Bhushan	
2011	Padma Vibhushan	

=== National Film Awards ===
- Dadasaheb Phalke Award (1991)

=== Filmfare awards ===
- Filmfare Award for Best Film – Telugu – Sudigundalu (1968) (shared with Adurthi Subba Rao)
- Filmfare Award for Best Actor – Telugu – Marapurani Manishi (1973)
- Best Actor – Telugu – Aatma Bandhuvulu (1987)
- Filmfare Lifetime Achievement Award – South (1988)
- Best Actor – Telugu – Seetharamayya gari Manavaralu (1991)

=== Nandi Awards ===
- Raghupathi Venkaiah Award (1989)
- NTR National Award (1996)

Nandi Award for Best Actor

- Doctor Chakravarthy (1964)
- Antastulu (1965)
- Sudigundalu (1967)
- Meghasandesam (1982)
- Bangaru Kutumbam (1994)

=== Other State honours ===
- Kalidasu Kaustubh from Madhya Pradesh State
- Appointed as an adviser to the State Film Development Corporation.
- Tamil Nadu State Film Honorary Award – Arignar Anna Award in 1992
- Department of India Post released a commemorative postal stamp on his 100th birth anniversary at Dak Sadan in Hyderabad.

== Legacy ==
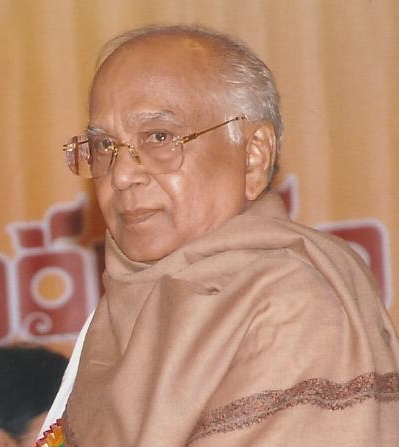
Nageswara Rao in 2014

The ANR National Award is instituted by the Akkineni International Foundation in the honor of Akkineni Nageswara Rao. The award is given annually to recognize people for their lifetime achievements and contributions to the Indian film industry.

Akkineni played an instrumental role in shifting the base of Telugu cinema from Madras to Hyderabad. During the late 1970s, he made a point to work only in the films that were produced in Andhra Pradesh (except for Vijaya Vauhini Studios and Venus Studios films). In 1976, he established Annapurna Studios in Hyderabad as part of his efforts to provide the necessary infrastructure to produce films there. It was established in 1976 on the 22-acre site allotted to him by the Andhra Pradesh government in Banjara Hills. It was inaugurated by the then President of India, Fakhruddin Ali Ahmed.

== In popular culture ==
- In the 2018 biopic Mahanati, his character was portrayed by his grandson Naga Chaitanya.
- In the 2019 biopics: NTR: Kathanayakudu and NTR: Mahanayakudu, his character was portrayed by his grandson Sumanth.
