= Kalidasu =

- Directed by: G. Ravicharan Reddy
- Written by: G. Ravicharan Reddy
- Screenplay by: G. Ravicharan Reddy
- Story by: G. Ravicharan Reddy
- Produced by: Chinthalapudi Srinivasa Rao; Anumolu Naga Susheela
- Starring: Sushanth; Tamannaah Bhatia
- Cinematography: Akhilan
- Edited by: Gautham Raju
- Music by: Chakri
- Production companies: Sri Nag Corporation; Annapurna Studios
- Release date: 11 April 2008
- Country: India
- Language: Telugu

Kalidasu is a 2008 Telugu language film, directed by G. Ravicharan Reddy and produced by Chinthalapudi Srinivasa Rao and A. Naga Suseela, under Sri Nag Corporation. The film stars Sushanth and Tamannaah Bhatia. The film was a success at box office playing more than 50 days at a number of centers across Andhra Pradesh.

== Plot ==
Kalidasu is the son of a sincere police officer, who is killed in the hands of a factionist (GV). However, Kalidasu kills that factionist and escapes from Rayalaseema and reaches Guntur. Kanakadurga brings him up along with her son Jai Dev. Kalidasu helps Dev to continue his studies in Hyderabad, by turning himself a car-lifter. Baba buys such lifted cars. His son, Basha also becomes Kalidasu's good friend. Once, Kalidasu lifts a car and finds a girl hiding in it. The girl says that her name is Archana and pretends that she is a lunatic. But Kalidasu does not believe that she is lunatic and suspects her that she is pretending. Once, some goons led by Pratap and Ajay reach Guntur and take away Mirchi after killing Basha.

Kalidasu goes to Hyderabad after noticing Dev's photo with Mirchi in her mobile phone. However, after going to the college, the principal reveals that Dev is killed by the goons led by a political leader and his henchmen Pratap and Ajay to save the college maintained by Archana (real name of Mirchi). Kalidasu decides to take revenge against the killers of Basha and Dev. Then Kalidasu starts his mind game and plays a trick, which makes Pratap to kill his own brothers. Later, Ajay kills his brother-in-law, Pratap. In the climax, Kalidasu's trick again makes Ajay meet his own death. The film ends on a happy note as Kalidasu and Archana are in love and lead a happy life.

== Cast ==
- Sushanth as Kalidasu
- Tamannaah Bhatia as Archana
- Ajay as Ajay
- Sunil as Basha
- Vamsikrishna as Jayadev
- Rajan P. Dev as Home Minister
- Vinod Kumar Alva as Pratap
- Jayasudha as Kanakadurga
- Nagababu as Kalidasu's Father
- Ravi Babu as Police Officer
- Tanikella Bharani as Principal of college
- Chalapathi Rao
- Subbaraju
- Vajja Venkata Gridhar
- Satyam Rajesh
- Fish Venkat
- Hema

== Music ==
Kalidasu

Soundtrack album to Kalidasu by Chakri
- Released: 31 March 2008
- Recorded: 2008
- Genre: Feature film soundtrack
- Language: Telugu
- Label: Aditya Music
- Producer: Chakri

Music of the film was released on 31 March 2008 at a function organized in Annapurna studios. The function was held without inviting press as it was an exclusive event to Nagarjuna's MAA TV. The producer has later given the event gallery to the press. The music of the film was composed by Chakri and songs were penned by Chandrabose

No.	Song	Singers	Length (m:ss)
1	"Hey Baby Hey Baby "	Chakri, Kousalya	05:13
2	"Thadisi Mopedu "	Ravivarma, Anuradha Sriram	05:10
3	"Ellake Ellake "	Vasu, Geeta Madhuri	04:03
4	"Prema (Okasari Karam) "	Chakri, Kousalya	03:58
5	"Pada Padarey"	Devan	04:37
6	"Cheemalemo Chakkara"	Baba Sehgal	04:27

== Reception ==
Telugucinema.com gave a review of rating 3/5 stating "Sushanth makes decent debut. He can become good actor by honing skills further. A very formulaic story but decent film for a debutant." Oneindia Entertainment gave a review stating "Despite less glamour, the debutant hero, Sushant, is able to gain mass hero image. There are several elements in the film like sentiment, glamour, action and love scenes in the film to cater to the needs of all classes of audiences. The film does not appear like a debutant's film and the production values of Sri Nag Corporation are adequate." IndiaGlitz gave a review stating "Sushant showed excellent ease in dances and action scenes, despite it is his debut film. Tamanna too looked gorgeous in the film in ultra modern outfits. She was very romantic all through the film. Though there is not much scope to prove her acting talents, her role was moulded in a near sexy way. The director was able to maintain good tempo all through the film. He did never lose grip on the story. He moulded the hero's character with a sole aim of giving him a mass image." Cinegoer.com gave a review stating "The movie has nothing new or good to offer, but it isn't an unbearable affair either. Sushanth's debut is not bad, but a makeover and voice modulation, some more of the grooming and training (dance-fights-etc) he's obviously received will go a long way. For now, he has miles to travel before he gets a claim to fame. The movie has taken a middling formulaic route." Sify gave a review stating the film to be a watchable one.
