= Haal (film) =

Indian Malayalam language film

- Directed by: Veeraa
- Written by: Nishad Koya
- Produced by: Juby Thomas, Verra,Jay
- Starring: Shane Nigam; Sakshi Vaidya; Johny Antony
- Cinematography: Ravichandran
- Edited by: Akash Joseph Varghese
- Music by: Nandhagopan V.
- Production company: JVJ Productions
- Release date: 25 December 2025
- Country: India
- Language: Malayalam

Haal is a 2025 Indian Malayalam language film directed by Veeraa (in his directorial debut). The film stars Shane Nigam, Sakshi Vaidya and Johny Antony.

== Cast ==
- Shane Nigam as Asif Kadalundi
- Sakshi Vaidya as Mariya Fernandez
- Johny Antony
- Abin Bino
- Vineeth Beep Kumar
- Madhupal
- Sangita Madhavan Nair
- Drishya Cherot
- Joy Mathew
- Nishanth Sagar
- Niyas Becker
- Manoj K. U.
- Riyas Narmakala
- Suresh Krishna
- Raveendran
- Sohan Seenulal
- Dhyan Sreenivasan as Thomaskutty (cameo appearance)
- Unni Raja
- Sreedhanya as Mariya's mother
- Rony David Raj

== Controversies ==
=== Certification issue ===
The CBFC demanded a 15 cuts from the film for religious and sensitivity reason. They wanted to remove the scenes including "beef biriyani", "Dhwaja Pranaman" (salutation to the flag) and a Rakhi scene. Even though the changes are made, the CBFC informed to the producer that film would get an A certification.

The filmmakers moved legally to Kerala High Court. The high court judge reviewed the film and ordered to remove some scenes "Dhwaja Pranama" from the film and to release the film. Initially the film received a UA16+ certification and was released on Christmas.

=== Catholic Petitions ===
The Catholic Congress filed a petition on High court against their film arguing that the film would hurt sentiments of Christian communities, because the film portrays a bishop of Thamarassery as a supporter of Love Jihad.
