= Sayyeshaa =

Indian actress (born 1997)

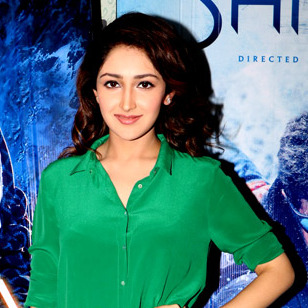
- Sayyeshaa at Shivaay trailer launch
- Born: Sayyeshaa Saigal; 12 August 1997 (age 28); Mumbai, Maharashtra, India
- Occupation: Actress
- Years active: 2015–2023
- Spouse: Arya (m. 2019)
- Children: 1
- Parents: Sumeet Saigal (father); Shaheen Banu (mother)
- Relatives: Chamiyan Bai (great-great-grandmother); Mian Ehsan-ul-Haq (great-grandfather); Naseem Banu (great-grandmother); Sathya (brother-in-law); Farah (step-mother); Saira Banu (grand-aunt); Dilip Kumar (grand-uncle)

Sayyeshaa Saigal (born 12 August 1997), known mononymously as Sayyeshaa, is an Indian actress who primarily works in Tamil films. She made her acting debut with the Telugu film Akhil (2015), for which she received SIIMA Award for Best Female Debut – Telugu nomination.

Sayyeshaa made her Hindi film debut with Shivaay (2016), receiving Stardust Award for Superstar of Tomorrow – Female nomination. She then made her Tamil film debut with Vanamagan (2017) and received SIIMA Award for Best Debut Actress - Tamil nomination. Her successful films include Kaappaan (2019) and Yuvarathnaa (2021), her Kannada film debut.

== Early life and background ==
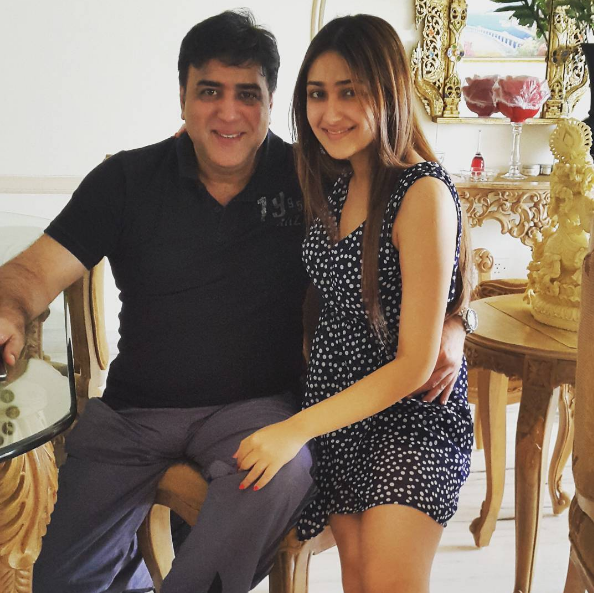
Sayyeshaa with her father, Sumeet Saigal

Sayyeshaa was born as Sayyeshaa Saigal on 12 August 1997 in Mumbai, Maharashtra. She is the daughter of actors Sumeet Saigal and Shaheen Banu. Sayyeshaa is the grandniece of actors Saira Banu, who is her mother's aunt and Dilip Kumar, and the great granddaughter of Naseem Banu.

Sayyeshaa completed her schooling from Ecole Mondiale World School, Juhu. Her parents got divorced in 2003. Actress Farah Naaz is her step-mother.

== Personal life ==
Sayyeshaa started dating Tamil actor Arya after Ghajinikanth (2019). They got married on 10 March 2019, according to Islamic traditions in Hyderabad. Their daughter Ariana was born on 23 July 2021. Tamil actor Sathya is her brother-in-law.

== Career ==
=== Debut and career expansion (2015–2018) ===
Sayyeshaa made her film debut in 2015 with the Telugu film Akhil.She portrayed a medical student opposite Akhil Akkineni. The film was a commercial failure. Times of India noted, "Sayyeshaa is a surprise even though she isn’t given much to do. She emotes really well and dances like a dream." She received SIIMA Award for Best Female Debut – Telugu nomination for the film.

She made her Hindi film debut opposite Ajay Devgn in his second directorial film Shivaay. She portrayed an IFS officer. It was commercially unsuccessful but ran for more than 50 days at the box office. Bollywood Hungama stated, "Sayyeshaa does justice to her character." While Times of India termed her performance "decent". She received a Stardust Award for Superstar of Tomorrow – Female nomination for her performance.

In 2017, she made her Tamil film debut with Vanamagan. She portrayed a businesswoman opposite Jayam Ravi. Deccan Chronicle stated, "Sayyeshaa looks ravishing and she steals the show with her effortless performance."

Sayyeshaa had three releases in 2018. She first appeared opposite Karthi in Kadaikutty Singam. It was a box-office success. Deccan Chronicle mentioned, "Sayyeshaa looks beautiful and hogs the limelight despite limited scope." Next, she appeared in Junga opposite Vijay Sethupathi. Hindustan Times noted, "Sayyeshaa looks gorgeous, her role is minimal but she has done it well." She next appeared in Ghajinikanth, a remake of the Telugu film Bhale Bhale Magadivoy. She portrayed a Kuchupudi dancer opposite Arya. Sify mentioned, "Sayyeshaa looks super gorgeous. The actress scores well with her cute expressions and energetic moves."

=== Further career and recent work (2019–present) ===
Sayyeshaa portrayed PM's press secretary opposite Suriya in the 2019 film Kaappaan. It also starred Mohanlal, and Arya. It was a commercial success. The Week termed her role as a "better fleshed out character".

Sayyeshaa had two releases in 2021. She first portrayed a college student opposite Arya in Teddy. It released on Disney+ Hotstar. India Today stated, "Arya's chemistry with Sayyeshaa has worked really well. It makes you root for both the characters." She made her Kannada film debut with Yuvarathnaa opposite Puneeth Rajkumar. She portrayed a lecturer in this commercially successful film. The Hans India wrote, "Sayyeshaa has limited screen space but she looks gorgeous in those brief moments."

In 2023, Sayyeshaa made a special appearance in the song "Raawadi" for the Tamil film Pathu Thala starring Silambarasan.

== Media image ==
Sayyeshaa is a prominent celebrity endorser for brands and products including PC Jeweller and Cinthol.

Sayyeshaa ranked 19th in 2017 and 13th in 2018 in Chennai Times' 30 Most Desirable Women List. The actress is also widely known for her dancing skills.

== Filmography ==
=== Films ===
†	Denotes films that have not yet been released

- All films are in Tamil unless otherwise noted.

Year	Title	Role	Notes	Ref.
2015	Akhil	Divya	Telugu film	
2016	Shivaay	Anushka	Hindi film	
2017	Vanamagan	Kavya		
2018	Kadaikutty Singam	Kannukkiniyal "Iniya"		
2018	Junga	Yazhini		
2018	Ghajinikanth	Vandhana Sathyamoorthy		
2019	Kaappaan	Anjali Vasudev		
2021	Teddy	Srividya "Sri" Purushottaman		
2021	Yuvarathnaa	Vandana	Kannada film	
2023	Pathu Thala	Dancer	Final film, Special appearance in the song "Raawadi"	

== Awards and nominations ==
Year	Award	Category	Film	Result	Ref.
2015	South Indian International Movie Awards	Best Female Debut – Telugu	Akhil	Nominated	
2016	BIG Star Entertainment Awards	Most Entertaining Debut Actress	Shivaay	Nominated	
2016	Stardust Awards	Superstar of Tomorrow – Female	Shivaay	Nominated	
2017	South Indian International Movie Awards	Best Female Debut - Tamil	Vanamagan	Nominated	
2019	Edison Awards	Classic Icon	—N/a	Won	
