= Nari Nari Naduma Murari (2026 film) =

2026 film by Ram Abbaraju

- Theatrical release poster
- Directed by: Ram Abbaraju
- Screenplay by: Bhanu Bogavarapu; Nandu Savirigana; Ram Abbaraju
- Story by: Bhanu Bogavarapu; Nandu Savirigana
- Produced by: Anil Sunkara; Ramabrahmam Sunkara
- Starring: Sharwanand; Samyuktha; Sakshi Vaidya
- Cinematography: Gnana Shekar V. S.; J. Yuvaraj
- Edited by: Nakka Venkat Swamy
- Music by: Vishal Chandrashekhar
- Production companies: AK Entertainments; Adventures International Pvt Ltd
- Release date: 14 January 2026
- Running time: 145 minutes
- Country: India
- Language: Telugu
- Box office: est. ₹36 crore

Nari Nari Naduma Murari (transl. Krishna is amidst women) is a 2026 Indian Telugu-language romantic comedy film directed by Ram Abbaraju. The film was produced by Anil Sunkara and Ramabrahmam Sunkara, under AK Entertainments and Adventures International Pvt Ltd. The film features Sharwanand, Samyuktha and Sakshi Vaidya in lead roles alongside Naresh, Sunil, Sampath Raj, and Vennela Kishore in supporting roles.

The film was released on 14 January, coinciding with Sankranthi. It received positive reviews and turned out to be a decent hit praising the direction, Sharwanand's and Naresh's performances.

== Plot ==
Goutham and Nithya, both architects by profession, fall in love during their stay in Kerala. Nithya reveals this to her father, Ramalingaiah, who is a divorce lawyer. Ramalingaiah meets Goutham and says that their love is not true, as they have never fought with each other. However, on Nithya's insistence, Ramalingaiah agrees to their marriage on the condition that they have a court marriage. Goutham agrees reluctantly. Goutham's widowed father, Karthik, also marries a young woman named Pallavi, much to the dismay of Ramalingaiah.

Later, Karthik sees that Goutham has a tattoo on his chest with the name "Dia." Upon questioning, Goutham confesses that Dia was his college sweetheart, and with whom he had a court marriage, which is why he was hesitant when Ramalingaiah insisted on a court marriage. Gautham says that they broke up immediately, as Dia's father Krishnaprasad was against their union. Karthik and Goutham try to convince Nithya and Ramalingaiah to have a traditional wedding ceremony; however, they remain fixated on a court marriage.

Goutham and Nithya then go to the Sub-Registrar's office. There, Registrar Satyamurthy recognises Goutham and tells him that he cannot remarry unless he produces a divorce certificate of his marriage with Dia, failing which Satyamurthy will reveal the truth to Nithya. Goutham searches for Dia and accidentally comes across her at a temple. He realises that Dia is already married to someone else. Gautham tries to explain his situation to Dia but she walks away. With no option left, Goutham submits a fake death certificate of Dia to Sathyamurthy and obtains a date for court marriage.

Dia then joins as a team lead in the same office where Gautham and Nithya work. Dia threatens to expose Gautham in front of Nithya. Sathyamurthy runs into Dia accidentally and realises that Gautham has cheated him. He gives a final warning to Gautham to produce the divorce certificate before the date of court. Gautham confronts Dia and her father with their marriage certificate and threatens to expose it to her husband if Dia doesn't divorce him. Dia eventually agrees as she also learns from her father that it was he who persuaded Gautham to break up with her, and they both approach Lawyer Gunashekhar, who happens to be a disciple of Ramalingaiah. Later, at a party, Gunashekhar tells Ramalingaiah that Gautham approached him for a divorce; however, Gautham lies to Ramalingaiah that Karthik and Pallavi are taking a divorce and not him.

Gunashekhar cooks up a story that Dia is divorcing Gautham because he is infertile. Nithya and Ramalingaiah come across Gautham's infertility certificate, but Nithya accepts him nonetheless. The wedding date approaches, and the divorce hearing also falls on the same day. Ramalingaiah learns about this and tells Nithya. Nithya remains silent so as to see how far Gautham goes to cheat her. On the day of the hearing, Dia tells her husband, Arya, about this, and he brings her to court. Arya tells Gautham that though he was angry initially, he was happy that his wife was honest with him. The court grants divorce, and Gautham realises his mistake. He confesses to Nithya about his previous marriage and that he doesn't deserve to marry her.

Nithya keeps meeting Gautham to fight about it. It goes on for two years and Ramalingaiah tells Nithya that now they are actually in love and they should marry each other. Gautham and Nithya wed with their families' blessings.

== Cast ==
- Sharwanand as Potlakayala Goutham
- Samyuktha as Dia Kakarla
- Sakshi Vaidya as Vedula Nithya
- Naresh as Potlakayala Karthik, Gautham's father
- Sunil as N. Satyamurthy
- Sampath Raj as Adv. Vedula Ramalingaiah, Nithya's father
- Vennela Kishore as Gunashekhar "Guna", Ramalingaiah's apprentice and assistant
- Satya as Lovekusa, auto driver
- Srikanth Iyengar as Dr. Kakarla Krishna Prasad, Dia’s father
- Sudharshan as Jackie, Gautham's best friend
- Raghu Babu as Judge
- Getup Srinu as Srinu, Ramalingaiah’s assistant
- Sivannarayana Naripeddi as Mohana Krishna, Ramalingaiah's friend
- Madhunandan as Appalraj, Gautham and Nithya's colleague
- Siri Hanmanth as Pallavi "Chinnu", Karthik’s second wife and Gautham's stepmother
- Rajitha as Dia’s mother
- Madhumani as Pallavi’s mother
- Goparaju Vijay as Pallavi's father
- Sammeta Gandhi
- Lobo as a tattoo artist
- Tasty Teja as Registrar assistant
- Chaitanya Garikipati as Gautham's friend
- Sree Vishnu as Arya, Dia’s husband (cameo appearance)

== Production ==
Bhanu Bogavarapu wrote the story, and Nandu Savirigana wrote the dialogues. The screenplay was written by Ram Abbaraju. They did not have any actor in mind for the lead role while writing the script. As they finished writing, they looked for an actor. When Sharwanand asked Ram if he had a story for him, and they decided to make the film, finalising Sharwanand as the lead actor. In February 2024, it was rumoured that Sharwanand and Ram Abbaraju were collaborating on an untitled project with Samyuktha and Sakshi Vaidya as the female leads. In March 2024, the makers officially announced the project under the tentative title Sharwa37. The title, Nari Nari Naduma Murari, was unveiled by the makers on 14 January 2025, coinciding with Sankranti. In June 2024, the makers confirmed that Sakshi Vaidya joined the cast. In September 2024, it was reported that part of the filming had been completed in Kerala. The filming was completed in December 2025. In January 2026, it was confirmed that Sree Vishnu would appear in a cameo in the film. Ram approached Sree Vishnu as they had already collaborated in the 2023 film Samajavaragamana, and he agreed to play the cameo role. Sharwanand lost weight for his role in Biker, benefitting this film since he shot both Biker and Nari Nari Naduma Murari simultaneously.

== Music ==
The music was composed by Vishal Chandrashekhar.

All lyrics are written by Ramajogayya Sastry.

No.	Title	Singer(s)	Length
1.	"Darsanamey"	Yazin Nizar	4:14
2.	"Bhalle Bhalle"	Haricharan	4:21
3.	"Aa Nari Ee Nari"	Arvind Annest	3:43
4.	"Be Carefull Magarajulu"	Ram Miriyala	3:12
Total length:			15:30

== Release ==
Nari Nari Naduma Murari was released theatrically on 14 January 2026 coinciding with Sankranti. The film's first show premiered at 5:49 p.m. Speaking on the unusual release strategy, Anil Sunkara added that the idea came from his family, who wanted the film to be released before Ekadashi, an auspicious day in the Hindu calendar, which ends at 6:03 p.m. They chose to release the film at 5:49 p.m. as the number 9 has been viewed as lucky among the households across Telugu states. The film was released on Amazon Prime Video on 4 February 2026.

== Reception ==
=== Critical reception ===
Sandeep Athreya of Sakshi Post rated the film 3.25/5 stars and wrote, "With strong performances, especially from Sharwanand and Naresh, and a director who understands the pulse of humour-loving audiences, the film delivers consistent fun from start to finish." A critic from News18 rated the film 3.2/5 stars and wrote, "A Sankranti entertainer, Nari Nari Naduma Murari banks on situational comedy and strong performances by Sharwanand and Naresh, offering breezy laughs despite a predictable plot". T. Maruthi Acharya of India Today rated the film 3/5 stars and wrote, "Overall, despite inconsistencies in the second half, Naari Naari Naduma Murari is a clean, well-written family entertainer that understands its strengths and limitations."

Srivathsan Nadadhur of The Hindu wrote, "Nari Nari Naduma Murari is a lightweight rom-com with some purpose to its existence besides the mischief, fun and frolic. It remains breezy with plenty of situational humour and caters to family viewing, steering clear of double entendre." Suresh Kavirayani of Cinema Express rated the film 3/5 stars and wrote, "Without resorting to forced drama or over-the-top gimmicks, it delivers genuine humour driven by writing and performance." Jalapathi Gudelli of Telugucinema.com gave the film 2.75/5 stars and wrote, "Despite a draggy second half and some routine stretches, Naresh's track and the overall humorous tone work in its favour."

=== Box office ===
The film ended its theatrical run grossing ₹36 crore worldwide.
