= Maa Neella Tank =

Indian comedy-drama television series

- Genre: Comedy-drama
- Written by: Kittu Vissapragada (dialogues)
- Screenplay by: Rajshree Bisht; Suresh Mysore
- Story by: Rajshree Bisht; Suresh Mysore
- Directed by: Lakshmi Sowjanya
- Starring: Sushanth; Priya Anand; Sudharshan; Prem Sagar; Nirosha; Ramaraju; Divi Vadthya
- Composer: Naren RK Siddhartha
- Country of origin: India
- Original language: Telugu
- No. of seasons: 1
- No. of episodes: 8

Production
- Producer: Praveen Kolla
- Cinematography: Aravind Viswanathan
- Editor: Kotagiri Venkateswara Rao
- Running time: 22–40 minutes
- Production company: Kolla Entertainment

Original release
- Network: ZEE5
- Release: 15 July 2022

Maa Neella Tank (transl. Our water tank) is a 2022 Indian Telugu-language comedy-drama streaming television series directed by Lakshmi Sowjanya and produced by Praveen Kolla. It stars Sushanth, Priya Anand, and Sudharshan. Maa Neella Tank premiered on ZEE5 on 15 July 2022.

== Synopsis ==
Sarpanch Kodandam's son Gopal, a Buchivolu villager, threatens to jump from a water tank in order to marry Surekha. Kodandam is concerned about his career and image, so he appoints SI Vamsi to search for Surekha.

== Cast ==
- Sushanth as S.I. Vamsi
- Priya Anand as Surekha
- Sudharshan as Gopal
- Prem Sagar as Sarpanch Kodandam: father of Gopal
- Nirosha as Chamundi: wife of Kodandam; mother of Gopal
- Ramaraju as Narasimham
- Divi Vadthya as Ramya: sister of Surekha
- Vasu Inturi as Murthy
- Appaji Ambarisha Darbha as Ramana: father of Surekha
- Annapurna as Boonemma
- Bindu Chandramouli as Bhargavi: mother of Surekha
- Sandeep Varanasi as Subbu
- Lavanya Reddy as Revathy
- Sara as Saritha
- Subba Rao as Purohithudu
- Pushyamitra as Shiva
- Appu as Rangadu
- Naresh as Seenu

== Episodes ==
No.	Title	Directed by	Written by	Original release date
1	"The Idea of Self-murder"	Lakshmi Sowjanya	Rajshree Bisht; Suresh Mysore	15 July 2022
Surekha runs away from home. The Sarpanch's son Gopal, who loves her, climbs up the village water tank, Neella. He starts screaming and blaming his father Kodandam regarding Surekha. Kodandam is in a fix: therefore, Murty requests inspector Vamshi to find the missing Surekha. Vamshi learns where Surekha is and reaches her. Kodandam has the challenge to protect his reputation and save his son. His competitor Narasimham repeatedly tries to blackmark Kodandam.
2	"A Favour and Fraud"	Lakshmi Sowjanya	Rajshree Bisht; Suresh Mysore	15 July 2022
Sub inspector Vamshi meets Surekha, and lies to her to gain her trust and take her back. On returning to the village, a shocked Surekha learns that Vamsi had lied to her to bring her back. Vamshi, who is a bit hurt from fooling Surekha is shattered when Gurumurthy tells him that his transfer letter would be given only after Surekha's marriage.
3	"Celebrating the Chaos"	Lakshmi Sowjanya	Rajshree Bisht; Suresh Mysore	15 July 2022
Surekha realises she has no choice but get married. So she returns to her father's shop where she was working earlier. Vamsi still feels guilty about lying to Surekha but he has no choice either as he really needs the letter from the Sarpanch to take a transfer to Hyderabad. Surekha's family is not happy either about her decision to proceed with the marriage.
4	"Alliance or Angiush?"	Lakshmi Sowjanya	Rajshree Bisht; Suresh Mysore	15 July 2022
The episode starts with Gopal's crazy acts, and his madness regarding Murthy. Surekha's parents visit Gopal's house and Chamundi approves of the marriage provided she is allowed to buy Surekha's father's store. Surekha is upset that the store is shut and Chamundi is now the new owner.
5	"Planning the Twist"	Lakshmi Sowjanya	Rajshree Bisht; Suresh Mysore	15 July 2022
Vamsi discovers shocking facts about Gopal and his love for Surekha. When he further finds out that the shop has been bought by Chamundi, he rushes to check on Surekha who is again planning to run away. At Kodandam's house, the pujari is called to fix the date of marriage. Gurumurthy confronts the pantulu who he had bribed to push the construction of the Neella tank. Surekha and Vamshi hatch a plan together.
6	"The Selfie-ish Love"	Lakshmi Sowjanya	Rajshree Bisht; Suresh Mysore	15 July 2022
The true cunning face of Narasimham is revealed in this episode. Surekha and Vamshi had falsely believed that he would help Surekha get out of the marriage with Gopal. However, Narasimham ties up with Kodandam to ensure Surekha marries Gopal, all the while keeping the repair of the water tank in loop. Surekha finds herself in a helpless situation.
7	"Love and its side effects"	Lakshmi Sowjanya	Rajshree Bisht; Suresh Mysore	15 July 2022
Narasimham begins the pooja of the water tank and tries to establish himself as the true leader. On the other hand, the engagement ceremony of Gopal and Surekha starts. Vamshi's feels even more guilty about deceiving Surekha. He tries to apologise to Surekha.
8	"Agreeing to Disagree"	Lakshmi Sowjanya	Rajshree Bisht; Suresh Mysore	15 July 2022
In the final episode, everyone's true face will be revealed.

== Reception ==
Sangeetha Devi Dundoo of The Hindu opined that the series "could have been a lot more fun" further writing "Maa Neella Tank is an eight-episode series that feels at least two or three episodes longer. When things take a turn in the last two episodes and the story heads to its logical conclusion, it is too little and too late to sustain interest." The Times of India gave a rating of 2.5 out of 5 and stated that "While the series had all the ingredients of a potential satirical comedy, too many episodes, recurring themes, and lack of action in some episodes make it a missed opportunity – it needed a more precise and engaging script".
