= Con City =

- Theatrical release poster
- Directed by: Harish Durairaj
- Written by: Harish Durairaj
- Produced by: Harish Durairaj
- Starring: Arjun Das; Anna Ben; Yogi Babu; Vadivukkarasi; Akhilan; Sakshi Vaidya
- Cinematography: Aravind Viswanathan
- Edited by: Arul Moses A
- Music by: Sean Roldan
- Production companies: Power House Pictures; Maali & Manvi Movie Makers; Klout Studios; Silver Tree Studios
- Release date: 26 June 2026
- Running time: 151 minutes
- Country: India
- Language: Tamil

Con City is a 2026 Indian Tamil-language crime comedy film written, produced and directed by Harish Durairaj in his directorial debut. The film stars Arjun Das and Anna Ben, with Yogi Babu, Vadivukkarasi, Akhilan and Sakshi Vaidya in supporting roles. It was released on 26 June 2026.

== Plot ==
In the town of Mulki, Saravana runs a small mess alongside Mithra, and together they care for their young son, Jeeva, who appears to have a physical disability and uses a wheelchair. Although Saravana and Mithra's marriage appears to be strained and emotionally separated, they continue living together for Jeeva's sake. Also sharing their home are Mithra's brother, Jacky, and the elderly Janaki, giving the appearance of a struggling but close-knit family.

The family's quiet life is shattered when Jeeva disappears from school. CCTV footage confirms that he has been kidnapped, sending the family into a frantic search. As they review the footage with school security, it becomes clear that the kidnapping is not random.

The film then shifts into a series of flashbacks that reveal the family's greatest secret. None of them are related by blood, nor are they ordinary citizens. Each member is a skilled con artist who was once cheated or exploited by powerful people. Driven into desperate circumstances, they turned to fraud to survive before eventually forming an unconventional family built on trust and shared hardship.

Saravana previously worked for an electricity collection company as an EF officer. He discovered a way to disable receipt printers, allowing him to collect electricity bill payments, issue handwritten receipts, and secretly pocket the money. He later partnered with his friend Satha to grow his earnings through insider trading and launched an investment company called Get Money Quick.

Mithra lost her home after falling victim to a fraudulent property scheme in which scammers posed as legitimate housing agents. After being ruined financially, she began running a similar real estate scam herself, eventually making a fortune through deception.

Jacky and Janaki seek treatment from a doctor who is implied to have fraudulently obtained his medical qualifications. After receiving confusing diagnoses and learning that Janaki supposedly requires expensive treatment, Jacky starts an online fundraising campaign using the charitable trust established by his late father. The campaign raises a large amount of money. When they return for further consultation, the doctor suddenly claims that Janaki is no longer ill after failing to properly interpret her scans. Jacky wants to refund the donations, but Janaki instead encourages him to use the money to establish his dream film production company.

Eventually, Mithra, Jacky, and Janaki invest their earnings into Saravana's company, making all four financially successful. Saravana's personal life also flourishes, and he becomes engaged to his girlfriend, whose father manages a toll plaza.

Their fortunes collapse when Saravana's childhood friend Sabari asks him for financial help. Trusting his friend, Saravana invests a large sum in an illegal business deal. Sabari is murdered during the transaction, the money disappears, and Saravana loses not only his own savings but also the investments entrusted to him by Mithra, Jacky, and Janaki.

The four are arrested during the investigation. Mithra, Jacky, and Janaki insist that Saravana has the missing money, while Saravana maintains that Sabari had it before his death. Frustrated by the lack of answers, the investigating officers consider extreme measures. Among the police is the feared officer Kalyana Sundaram, who has a reputation for brutally punishing even minor offenders. After another officer receives instructions suggesting an encounter killing if the suspects refuse to cooperate, Saravana overpowers a policeman during Mithra's attempted arrest, frees the others, and the group escapes.

Following their escape, Mithra gives birth to Jeeva. To avoid suspicion while living as fugitives, the four begin posing as a normal family and establish the mess restaurant as a cover. Despite their criminal past, they genuinely care for Jeeva and the audience sees them lovingly raise him while being confined to a wheelchair.

Returning to the present, the family discovers through the CCTV footage that Jeeva's kidnapper is none other than Kalyana Sundaram. Initially believing he has finally tracked them down for their past crimes, they soon learn his true motive. Kalyana is himself deeply corrupt. Although he amassed considerable wealth through bribery and extortion, he squandered it through a gambling addiction. He reveals that years earlier he intentionally allowed the family to escape so he could exploit them in the future. He promises to release Jeeva only if they help him make another fortune.

Kalyana's men keep Jeeva captive in an abandoned factory after locking the wheels of his wheelchair. Forced to cooperate, the family devises an elaborate scam involving a fake toll plaza. Disguising themselves as a Korean family—though others comically mistake them for Anglo-Indians—they manipulate public opinion by poisoning a journalist and publishing false news through his account claiming that a discontinued toll road has been reinstated. The fake toll successfully generates large sums of money.

At the same time, they persuade Kalyana to invest heavily in what appears to be a revolutionary invention capable of generating electricity from water, convincing him that owning the majority stake will eventually make him enormously wealthy through patent rights.

After raising enough money, the family demands Jeeva's release. Instead, Kalyana decides to kill them all to eliminate any witnesses to his corruption. During the confrontation, Saravana tells Jeeva over the phone to run. In a major twist, Jeeva stands up and escapes—it is revealed that he has been able to walk all along.

The film explains that Jeeva originally injured his leg while playing with Saravana shortly before a school admission interview, for a school Mithra really wanted her son to attend. The school administrator mistakenly believed he had a permanent developmental disability and admitted him out of sympathy after previously rejecting his application. Hoping to secure Jeeva's education. Saravana later tells Jeeva that lying is wrong, but asks him to continue using the wheelchair at school until the truth can safely come out.

Jeeva flees from his captors and sends his location to the family. They overpower Kalyana, but are soon stranded. Just as escape seems impossible, Satha arrives with a car, allowing them to rescue Jeeva and flee.

Kalyana later contacts them, warning that their fake toll operation has defrauded multiple central government officials and that authorities will relentlessly pursue them. The family reveals they had anticipated this outcome. The water-powered electricity invention was itself another elaborate scam. The supposed inventor was merely a local vendor they had recruited to impersonate a scientist.

Saravana also reveals that while accessing the poisoned journalist's information, he uncovered evidence proving that Kalyana had orchestrated Sabari's murder years earlier. He anonymously passes this information to Sabari's powerful father. As Kalyana is arrested, Sabari's father arrives carrying a knife, implying that Kalyana's fate may ultimately be sealed outside the justice system.

In the ending, the unconventional family remains together, now with their money intact and hopeful for a better future. During the final scene, Satha drives away in a separate car, parodying the emotional ending of Fast and Furious 7, as the vehicles part ways on different roads.

== Cast ==
- Arjun Das as Saravana
- Anna Ben as Mithra
- Yogi Babu as Jacky
  - Yogi Babu also makes a photographic appearance as Boxer Selvaraj
- Vadivukkarasi as Janaki
- Akhilan as Jeeva
- Sakshi Vaidya as Aishu
- Nanda Gopal as Kalayana Sundaram
- VTV Ganesh as Gangadharan
- Dheepa Ramanujam as Saravana's mother
- Radha Ravi as Abdul Razak
- Aruldoss as Gopi
- Shaji Chen as MLA Senthil
- Thambi Ramaiah as Minister Varadharaj
- Ramesh Thilak as Dr. Subramani
- Baradwaj Rangan as House owner
- Imman Annachi as Chutti Anna
- Madhankumar Dakshinamoorthy as Reporter
- Ponvannan as Aishu's father
- Ragu Esaki as Siva
- Sanjeev Sureshkumar as Sabari
- Sathanand as Satha
- Madhusudhan Rao as Sabari’s father
- Munnar Ramesh as House owner
- Lallu as Karthi
- Adithya Kathir
- Vetrivel Raja as police officer
- Sean Roldan as an audience member (special appearance)
- VJ Adams as himself (cameo appearance)

== Production ==
Con City is the directorial debut of Harish Durairaj, who also produced it. Production began in December 2025. The film was shot in locations including Chennai, Mangaluru and Mumbai. Filming wrapped in May 2026.

== Soundtrack ==
The music was composed by Sean Roldan, with lyrics by Mohan Rajan.

Track listing
No.	Title	Singer(s)	Length
1.	"Kanna Bro"	Ananthu	3:40
2.	"Fraud Payale"	Sublahshini	3:46
3.	"Oru Naal Maruma"	Kaber Vasuki	5:27
4.	"Naan Dhaan King"	Kelithee, Sean Roldan, Lalitha Sudha	4:06
5.	"Pon Magane Aarariro"	Vijay Yesudas	3:24
6.	"Korean Family"	Vangal Pulla Vicky, Sublahshini	3:54
Total length:			24:17

== Release ==
Con City was released on 26 June 2026.

=== Reception ===
Prashanth Vallavan of Cinema Express wrote, "Right from the beginning, we cannot help but spot several lines or scenes that feel redundant after the fact. Ironically, the film tries to have fun with itself while also trying to present itself as being more complex and intricate than it actually is" and felt it "could have been a much better film with ruthless script editing". Bhuvanesh Chandar of The Hindu wrote that Con City had the "potential to become a fun entertainer about an unlikely gang of con artists, until the writing begins to teeter away from that promise. Janani K of India Today wrote, "Con City sells you the idea of a clever scam but delivers the brilliance of a basic Google search".

Abhinav Subramanian of The Times of India wrote, "There's nothing here you haven't seen, but the cast makes the familiar go down smooth. Con City is happy being a decent hang, and you might be too". Gopi Selva of Tamil Guardian wrote, "Con City is a fun film which can be enjoyed with the family". He compared the film to Lucky Baskhar, but said it is "easily a far superior film in both its storytelling and craft". Sreeju Sudhakaran of Rediff.com said the film had a "fun premise and a handful of clever scams, but its biggest con is failing to convince you it's smarter than it really is". Vishal Menon of The Hollywood Reporter India wrote, "With all its pacing and detailing issues, Con City may have worked a lot better as a mini-series with enough time and importance given to the many scams that make up its runtime. But with its detour into a toll booth scam, it ends up as a comedy that takes a serious toll on one's patience.

=== Box office ===
Con City earned ₹5 crore (US$530,000) worldwide during its opening weekend, with its domestic collections amounting to ₹3.28 crore (US$350,000).
