= Aatadukundam Raa =

- Theatrical release poster
- Directed by: G. Nageswara Reddy
- Screenplay by: Sreedhar Seepana
- Produced by: Anumolu Naga Susheela; Srinivasa Rao Chinthalapudi
- Starring: Sushanth; Sonam Bajwa
- Cinematography: Dasaradhi Sivendra
- Edited by: Gautham Raju
- Music by: Anup Rubens
- Production company: Sri Nag Corporation
- Release date: 19 August 2016
- Country: India
- Language: Telugu

Aatadukundam Raa (transl. Come, let's play) is a 2016 Telugu-language action comedy drama film directed by G. Nageswara Reddy. The film stars Sushanth and Sonam Bajwa in the lead roles.

== Cast ==
- Sushanth as Karthik
- Sonam Bajwa as Shruthi
- Anand as Anand Rao
- Murali Sharma as Vijay Rao
- Brahmanandam as Girija Rao
- Posani Krishna Murali as Somaraju
- Raghu Babu as Kanaka Rao
- Rama Prabha
- Prudhvi Raj
- Vennela Kishore as Karthik's friend
- Jhansi
- Ananth Babu

Guest appearances

- Naga Chaitanya
- Akhil Akkineni in the song "Aatadukundam Raa"

== Soundtrack ==
The music was composed by Anup Rubens. The song "Palleku Podam" from Devadasu was reused for this film.

No.	Title	Singer(s)	Length
1.	"Round And Round"	Anurag Kulkarni	4:18
2.	"Joomega"	Naresh Iyer, Anandi Joshi	4:11
3.	"Aatadukundam Raa"	Anurag Kulkarni, Sahiti Chaganti	3:54
4.	"Palleku Podam"	Anup Rubens, Sravani, Srekar (rap)	4:14
5.	"Time Machine (theme)"		1:22
Total length:			14:59

== Release ==
A critic from The Times of India states that "This film is a classic example of another film cashing in on the names of celebs". A critic from The Hindu wrote that "Rather than stepping into this time machine, watch some old hits of ANR or Nagarjuna".
