= Akhil (film) =

2015 film by V. V. Vinayak

Akhil: The Power of Jua
- Film poster
- Directed by: V. V. Vinayak
- Written by: Kona Venkat (dialogue)
- Screenplay by: V. V. Vinayak
- Story by: Veligonda Srinivas
- Produced by: Nithiin; N. Sudhakar Reddy
- Starring: Akhil Akkineni; Sayyeshaa
- Cinematography: Amol Rathod
- Edited by: Gautham Raju
- Music by: Songs: Anup Rubens; S. Thaman; Score: Mani Sharma
- Production company: Sreshth Movies
- Release date: 11 November 2015
- Running time: 130 minutes
- Country: India
- Language: Telugu
- Budget: ₹50 crore
- Box office: est. ₹33.65 crore

Akhil: The Power of Jua is a 2015 Indian Telugu-language fantasy action comedy film directed by V. V. Vinayak and produced by Nithin and M. Sudhakar Reddy under Sresht Movies banner. The film stars Akhil Akkineni and Sayyeshaa in their debut. The film features score composed by Mani Sharma with soundtrack by Anup Rubens and S. Thaman. Vinayak wrote the screenplay from the story given by Veligonda Srinivas along with dialogue by Kona Venkat. Releasing on 11 November 2015 amidst huge hype and expectations, the film was a commercial failure.

== Plot ==
The story begins thousands of years ago with a voice narrating how the Earth would face destruction in the future due to the powerful UV rays of the Sun. Few saints in India foresee this destruction and make a sphere with the most powerful metals which possess an immense power that absorbs the harmful UV rays hence it protecting the Earth. Since it has to be placed at the Earth's equator, they give the sphere to a tribe in Congolia, Africa. They leave from there by warning them that it should be kept at the Earth's equator during every Solar eclipse. If they miss even one of the eclipses, then the earth should face major destruction. The African tribe names the Sphere Jua (Name of the Sun in Africa). Now the story moves to the present day, where a Russian don is plotting to capture the Jua so that he will have the solution when the world is in destruction and thinks he can rule the world. For this, he seeks the help of an Indian don. The Indian don sends his henchmen to the tribe to get the Jua, but Bodo, a young graduate of the tribe, takes it and escapes.

In Hyderabad, a young and carefree orphan named Akhil fights in the streets for earning and celebrates with friends. One day, Akhil meets a girl, Divya, and immediately falls in love with her. He impresses her in a couple of meetings by operating on her rabbit, which needs heart surgery with the help of K. V. Rajendra Prasad, Divya's college principal. Later Divya invites Akhil and his friends to her marriage. Akhil plots to break the marriage but find out that Kishore, the Fiancé of Divya, is in love with some other girl and unites Kishore with his lover, making Divya's dad furious, who is a Don in India as shown at the beginning of the movie. Disheartened, Divya leaves for Europe to find Kishore. Akhil learns that Divya is in Europe and follows her. After reaching her in Europe, Divya asks Akhil to act him as her lover, thinking that she can make Kishore envy. Meanwhile, Mambo, a thug of Indian don, searches for Bodo to get the Jua and shoots him in a chase. Bodo falls at Divya's apartment, and she treats him as she is a Medico. The very next day, Akhil tells Divya that he was the one who united Kishore and his lover, breaking Divya's marriage. She gets mad at him and tries to leave but is kidnapped by Mambo, who saw Divya while treating Bodo. Akhil gets injured while chasing them and got hit by Divya's dad, who discovers that he loves Divya. He falls unconscious under a tree, where a chain with a sun-shaped locket falls over his neck. Divya's father captures Akhil, and through him, he discovers that Mambo kidnapped his daughter. He calls Mambo and orders him to release his daughter, but Mambo refuses. Akhil escapes, finds out about Mambo's place, and leaves for Africa with Kishore to rescue Divya.

After reaching Africa, at the airport, a church father asks Akhil to hold his bible, cross, and white coat while he goes to the restroom. Johnson and Johnson, a cab driver who came there to pick up the Priest, mistake Akhil for the Priest and drive him in his car. Akhil asks him to drive to Congolia; Johnson resists taking him there as it is a dangerous place but due to Akhil's insistence takes him to the Place. Akhil, along with Kishore and Johnson, reaches Mambo's place and fights with his men, and takes Mambo's brother while holding him hostage. He rescues Divya, who still hates him. In the meantime, Divya's father comes to rescue her from Mambo but gets trapped there. Mambo calls Divya and warns her if they don't return to his place, he will kill her father. They all return to Mambo's place to rescue Divya's father. Mambo asks Divya where was Jua kept, and she misguides him by telling him the wrong place. Mambo, after reaching the place, finds out he was fooled by Divya and goes back to her. By then, they all manage to escape and hide in a forest where Akhil fights with a tiger to save Divya, which makes Divya forgive him, and her father likes and accepts him as his son-in-law. The next day they go to Congolia village, where the African tribe guarding the Jua live. At the same time, a Russian don and Mambo with his men reach there and shoot Akhil, but a young man of the tribe guards him by giving him his life. Akhil asks him why he sacrificed his life for him then the young man points toward the sun-shaped locket on Akhil's neck. He learns that he has some connection with this Jua, and he only should find it. Mambo again tries to shoot Akhil, then Divya tells the exact place where Jua was hidden. She tells them that Bodo dropped the Jua in a river full of piranhas and killer fish while he was escaping from Mambo. Akhil owes that he will bring the Jua back to the tribe. After getting the Jua by fighting the piranhas in the river, Akhil kills Mambo and his men. Meanwhile, the Russian don escapes in a helicopter with Jua. Akhil jumps onto the helicopter when it is about to take off and kills the Russian don and gets the Jua, while the pilot causes the helicopter to hit a volcano. Before the explosion, Akhil jumps out with a parachute and handover the Jua to the tribal head, who places it back at the Earth's equator and rescues the world from destruction. In the end, Divya and Akhil unite.

== Cast ==
- Akhil Akkineni as Akhil
- Sayyeshaa as Divya
- Rajendra Prasad as K.V. Rajendra Prasad
- Mahesh Manjrekar as Divya's father
- Brahmanandam as Johnson and Johnson
- Vennela Kishore as Kishore
- Jaya Prakash Reddy as Kishore's father
- Jean Louis Pascal as Mambo
- Madhunandan as Akhil's friend
- Krishna Teja as Akhil's friend
- Hema
- Byron Gibson as Katrochi
- Muhone Kellvin
- Karishna Karpal
- Fatima Roshan
- Nagarjuna in a special appearance in "Akkineni Akkineni" song

== Production ==
Akkineni made his debut with a cameo appearance in the climax of Manam (2014). Either Vikram Kumar or Deva Katta were expected to direct Akhil's debut as a lead actor. While Nagarjuna reportedly confirmed Vikram Kumar to direct Akhil's second film, Deva Katta was confirmed to direct Manchu Vishnu in the Telugu remake of Arima Nambi (2014). On 21 September 2014, Akhil said "I know that a lot of people are curious to know details about my debut film. However, I would like to clarify that I haven't made up my mind yet. I want to start my career with a blockbuster film and I'm not going to settle for anything less than that. If all goes well, I will announce details about my debut film in near future after Oka Laila Kosam releases. Till then, all I can say is, I'm still working hard on what my debut film should be", at an event celebrating Akkineni Nageswara Rao's birth anniversary and the success of Manam. Later V. V. Vinayak was approached to direct this film after the release of Alludu Seenu (2014).

Veligonda Srinivas, who penned the script for Nagarjuna's Dhamarukam (2012), wrote the film's story. Kona Venkat and Gopimohan were working on the film's screenplay. The film's principal photography was expected to begin on 15 November 2014. Anup Rubens & S. Thaman were selected as the music directors. Nithiin was reported to be a part of the film in late November 2014 which was supposed to be a romantic film with adventurous backdrop. He was also reported to produce the film while the story discussions slowed down as Vinayak's mother fell ill. Vinayak's mother died in early December 2014 because of which the film's launch was postponed by a week. The film was officially launched on 17 December 2014 in Hyderabad. Nithiin along with his father Sudhakar Reddy was confirmed to bankroll the film under the banner Sresht Movies.

Amol Rathod and Gautham Raju were confirmed as the cinematographer and editor, respectively. Kona Venkat was confirmed to pen the film's dialogues, while the screenplay was announced to be handled by Vinayak himself. Nithiin said that they are searching for a new actress as the female lead, and the regular shoot would begin in early January 2015. Akhil said in an interview with Sanchita Dash that the film is an action movie with few stunts and would be shot in a new style of filming. He also confirmed that a new actress would be selected, and screen tests are being held. He added that they opted for a new actress as he himself is a debutante and to minimize the burden and expectations on the film. Sayyeshaa was reported to be the female lead later marking her Telugu debut.

== Soundtrack ==
Akhil

Soundtrack album by Anup Rubens S. Thaman
- Released: 20 September 2015
- Recorded: 2015
- Genre: Soundtrack
- Length: 22:47
- Label: Lahari Music
- Producers: Anup Rubens; S. Thaman

The soundtrack was jointly composed by Anup Rubens and S. Thaman. The film's audio launch was held on 20 September 2015. The song "Akkineni Akkineni" uses a vocal sample of Eminem from his song Lose Yourself, from the 8 Mile soundtrack album.

Track-List
No.	Title	Lyrics	Music	Singer(s)	Length
1.	"Nenekkadunte (Energy)"	Krishna Chaitanya	Anup Rubens	Ranjith, Sharanya, Bhargavi Pillai	5:01
2.	"Hey Akhil"	Krishna Chaitanya	Anup Rubens	Rahul Pandey, Anup Rubens	4:08
3.	"Zara Zara Navvaradhe"	Krishna Chaitanya	Anup Rubens	Mohit Chauhan, Mohana Bhogaraju, Rahul Sipligunj, Srikar	4:11
4.	"Akkineni Akkineni"	Krishna Chaitanya	Anup Rubens	Divya Kumar, Bhargavi Pillai, Uma Neha, Mohana Bhogaraju	4:05
5.	"Padessavae"	Bhaskarabhatla Ravi Kumar	S. Thaman	Karthik, M. M. Manasi	5:20
Total length:					22:47

== Release and reception ==
The film was originally slated to release on 22 October; however, it got postponed many times. Visual effects were said to be the reason behind the delay.

Jeevi of Idlebrain.com rated the film 3 out of 5 and wrote, "Though he [Vinayak] has succeeded in launching Akhil as a star with huge potential, he should have taken care in treatment and logic". Pranita Jonnalagadda of The Times of India rated the film 2.5 out of 5 stars and wrote, "Director VV Vinayak wants to do a lot too – give a gripping story, bring in breathtaking VFX, have elaborate sets for songs and most importantly launch a star hero".

== Box office ==
Akhil has grossed ₹10 crore at the AP/Telangana box office on the first day, with a distributor share of ₹7.5 crore. The film with a total gross of ₹13.86 crore worldwide on its first day and became the highest opener for a debutant Telugu actor. The film grossed ₹33.65 crore by the end of its theatrical run.

== Accolades ==
Filmfare Awards South

- Won – Filmfare Award for Best Male Debut – South – Akhil Akkineni

CineMAA Awards

- Won – Best Male Debut – Akhil Akkineni

SIIMA Awards

- Won – SIIMA Award for Best Male Debut (Telugu) – Akhil Akkineni
- Nominated – SIIMA Award for Best Female Debut (Telugu) – Sayyeshaa Saigal

Santosham Film Awards

- Won – Best Debut Actor – Akhil Akkineni
