= Akkineni–Daggubati family =

Indian film family

- Family
- Current region: Jubilee Hills, Hyderabad, Telangana, India
- Origin: Prakasam and Krishna district, Andhra Pradesh
- Members: Akkineni Nageswara Rao; D. Ramanaidu; D. Suresh Babu; Venkatesh; Nagarjuna Akkineni; Amala Akkineni; Sumanth; Sushanth; Rana Daggubati; Naga Chaitanya; Sobhita Dhulipala; Akhil Akkineni
- Traditions: Telugu
- Heirlooms: Annapurna Studios, Ramanaidu Studios

The Akkineni–Daggubati family is a prominent Indian film family with a history predominantly in Telugu cinema. Akkineni Nageswara Rao and Daggubati Ramanaidu are the prominent heads of the two families. Members of the family include actors, film directors, and producers.

== Family tree ==
Daggubati-Akkineni family tree

Akkineni Nageswara Rao	Annapurna	D. Ramanaidu	Rajeswari
Sathyavathi Yarlagadda	Akkineni Amala	Akkineni Nagarjuna	Lakshmi Daggubati (divorced)	D. Suresh Babu	Lakshmi	Venkatesh
Naga Susheeila
Akhil Akkineni	Naga Chaitanya	Rana Daggubati
Sumanth	Sushanth

Note: Dashed lines indicate separation.

== First generation ==
- Akkineni Nageswara Rao, actor and producer, known by his initials ANR
  - Married to Annapurna Kollipara
- D. Ramanaidu, producer
  - Married to Rajeswari Yarlagadda
- A. V. Subba Rao (Anumolu. V. Subba Rao)
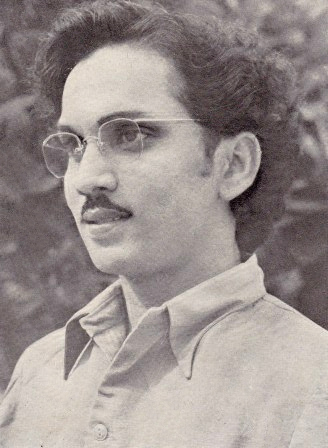
Akkineni Nageswara Rao

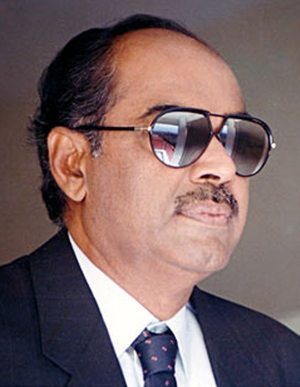
D. Ramanaidu

== Second generation ==
- Akkineni Sathyavathi; daughter of Nageswara Rao and Annapurna
  - Married to Surendra Yarlagadda
- Akkineni Venkat Rathnam producer; son of Nageswara Rao and Annapurna
  - Married to Akkineni Jyothsna
- Akkineni Naga Susheeila; daughter of Nageswara Rao and Annapurna
  - Married to Anumolu Satya Bhushana Rao, son of Anumolu. V. Subba Rao
- Saroja Akkineni; daughter of Nageswara Rao and Annapurna
- Nagarjuna actor and producer; son of Nageswara Rao and Annapurna
  - Married to Lakshmi Daggubati (divorced)
  - Married to Amala Mukherjee, actress
- D. Suresh Babu producer; son of Ramanaidu and Rajeswari
  - Married to Lakshmi
- Venkatesh actor; son of Ramanaidu and Rajeswari
  - Married to Neeraja
- Lakshmi Daggubati, daughter of Ramanaidu and Rajeswari
  - Married to Nagarjuna (divorced)
  - Married to Sharath Vijayaraghavan
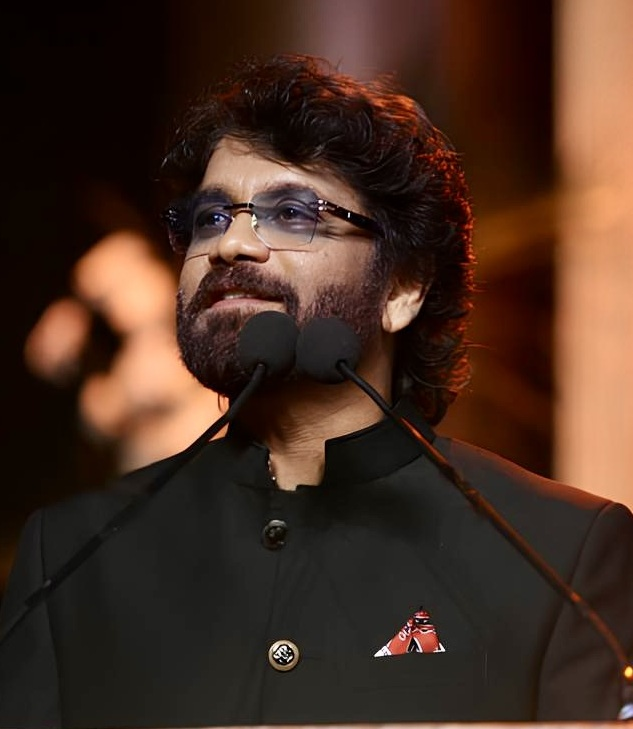
Nagarjuna
ANR's son

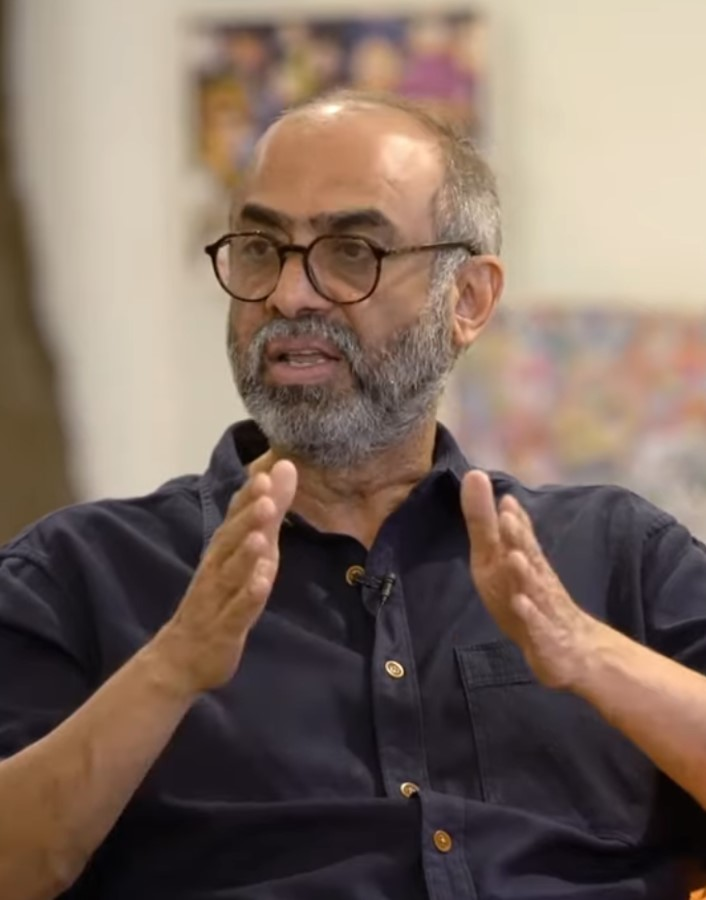
D. Suresh Babu
Ramanaidu's first son

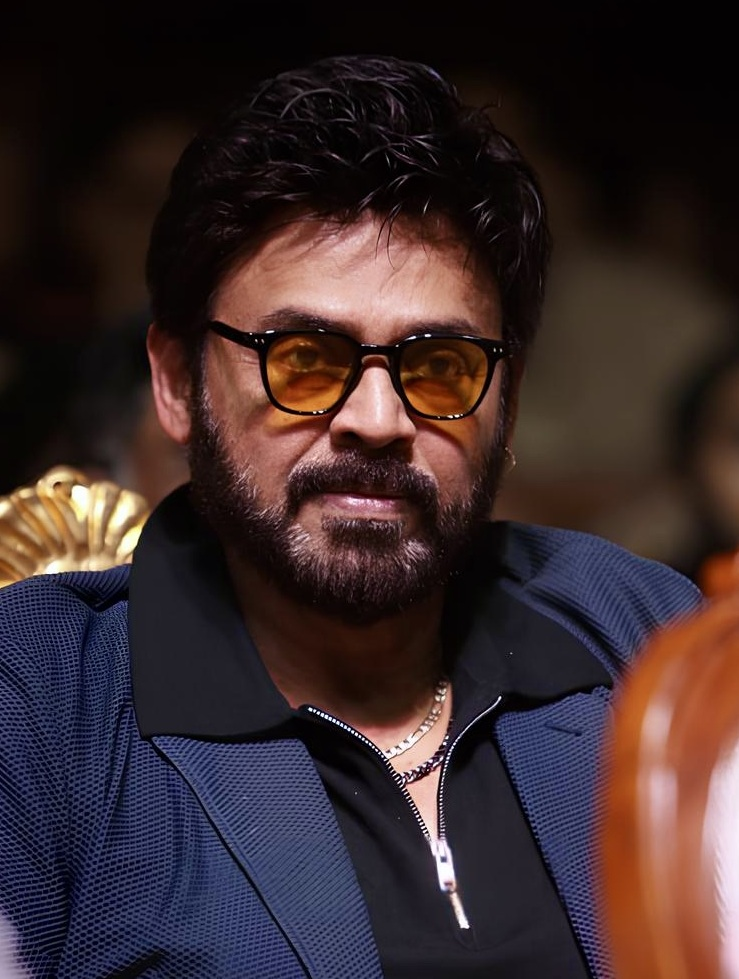
Venkatesh
Ramanaidu's second son

== Third generation ==
- Sumanth Kumar Yarlagadda, actor; son of Surendra Yarlagadda and Sathyavathi Akkineni
  - Married to Keerthi Reddy, actress (divorced)
- Supriya Yarlagadda, actress and producer; daughter of Surendra Yarlagadda and Sathyavathi Akkineni
  - Married to Charan
- Annapurna Akkineni, Elder Child; daughter of Akkineni Venkat and Akkineni Jyothsna
- Adhithya Akkineni, Younger Child; son of Akkineni Venkat and Akkineni Jyothsna
- Akkineni Naga Chaitanya, actor; son of Nagarjuna and Daggubati Lakshmi
  - Married to Samantha Ruth Prabhu, actress (divorced)
  - Married to Sobhita Dhulipala, actress (4 December 2024)
- Sushanth Anumolu, actor; son of Anumolu Satya Bhushana Rao and Naga Susheeila Anumolu, paternal grandson of producer A. V. Subba Rao (Anumolu. V. Subba Rao)
- Akhil Akkineni, actor; son of Nagarjuna and Amala
- Rana Daggubati, actor; son of Suresh Babu and Lakshmi
  - Married to Miheeka Bajaj
- Abhiram Daggubati; son of Suresh Babu and Lakshmi
- Malavika Daggubati; daughter of Suresh Babu and Lakshmi
  - Married to Bharath Krishna Rao
- Aashritha; daughter of Venkatesh and Neeraja
  - Married to Vinayak Reddy
- Bhavana; daughter of Venkatesh and Neeraja
- Hayavahini; daughter of Venkatesh and Neeraja
- Arjun; son of Venkatesh and Neeraja
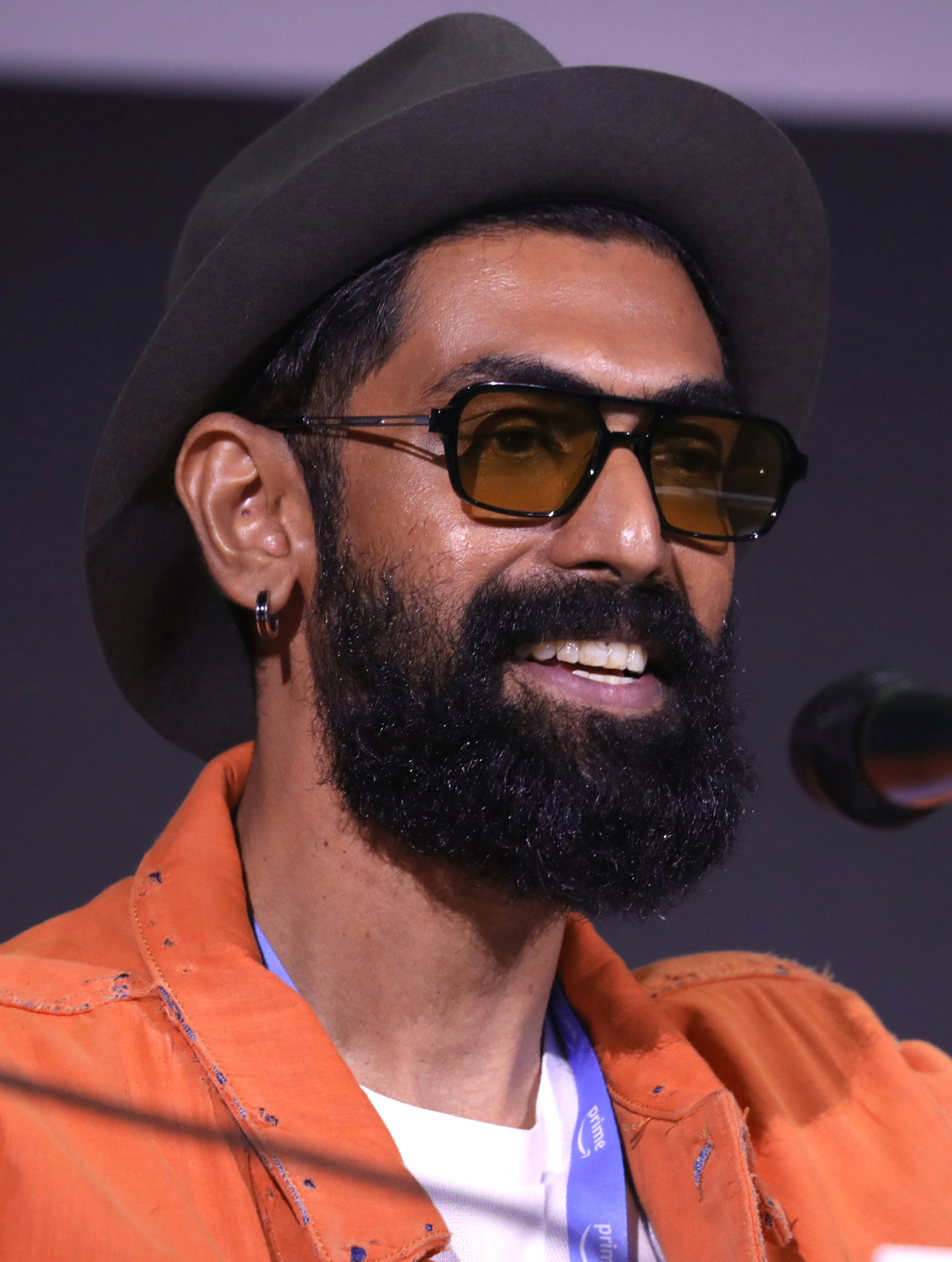
Rana Daggubati
Suresh Babu's son

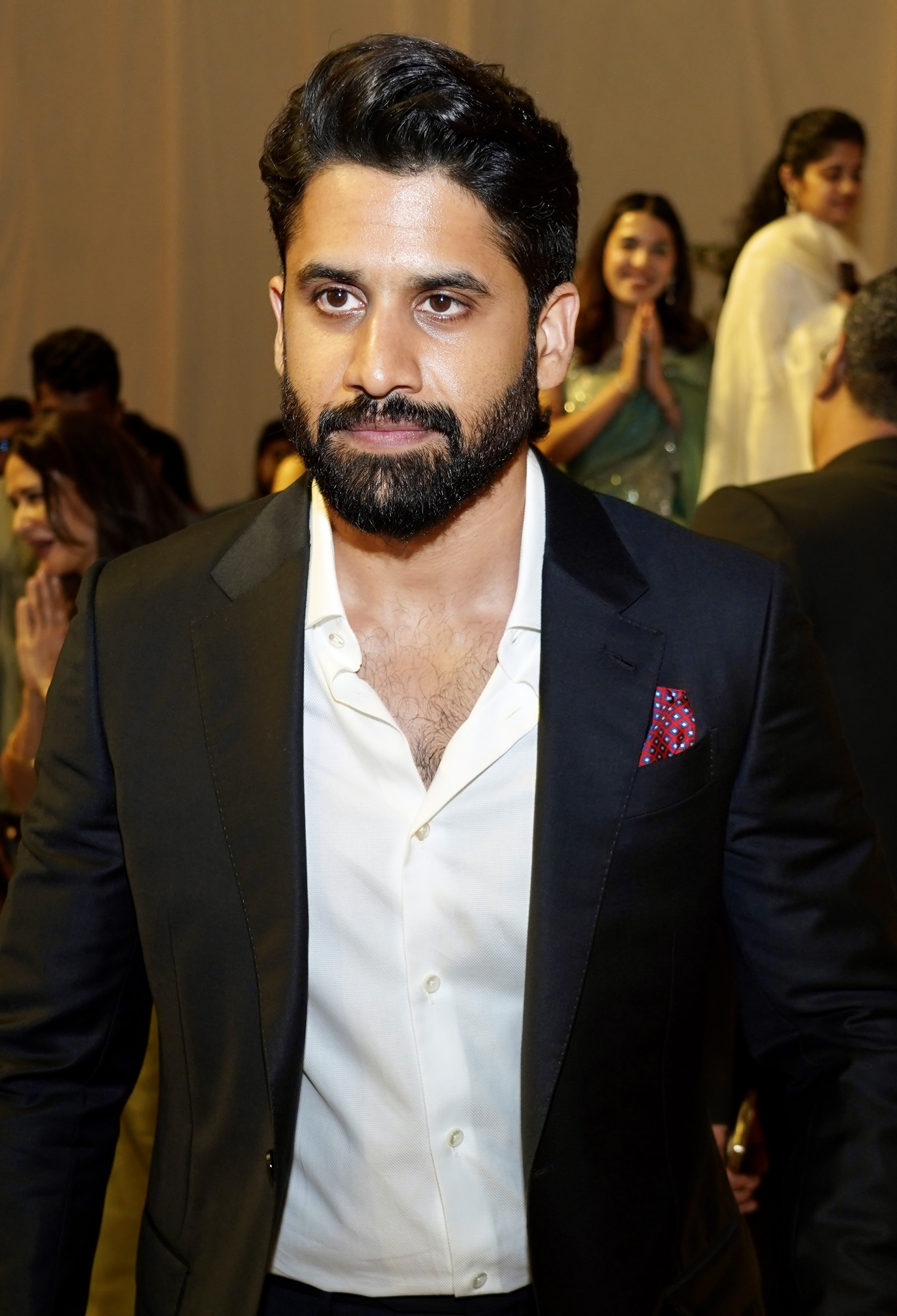
Naga Chaitanya
Son of Nagarjuna and Lakshmi

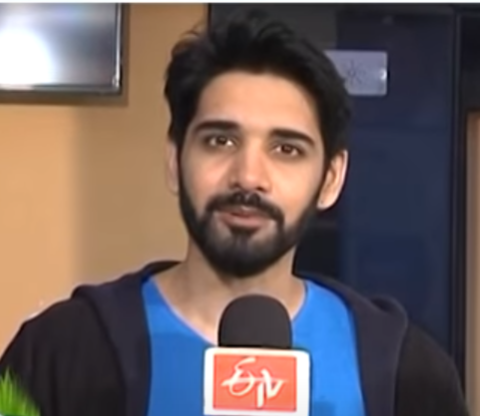
Sushanth
Son of Satya Bhushana and Susheeila

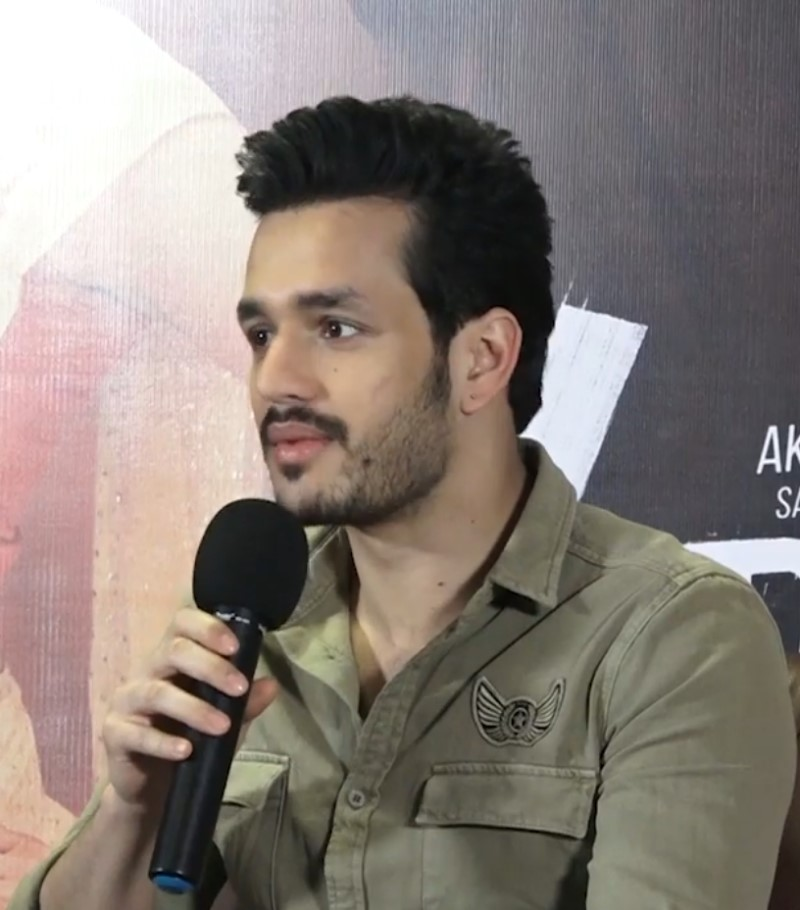
Akhil Akkineni
Son of Nagarjuna and Amala

== See also ==
- Konidela–Allu family
- Nandamuri–Nara family
