= Gandeevadhari Arjuna =

2023 film directed by Praveen Sattaru

- Theatrical release poster
- Directed by: Praveen Sattaru
- Written by: Praveen Sattaru; Abhijeeth Poondla
- Produced by: B. V. S. N. Prasad
- Starring: Varun Tej; Sakshi Vaidya; Vinay Rai
- Cinematography: Mukesh Gnanesh; Amol Rathod
- Edited by: Dharmendra Kakarala
- Music by: Mickey J. Meyer
- Production company: Sri Venkateswara Cine Chitra
- Release date: 25 August 2023
- Running time: 135 minutes
- Country: India
- Language: Telugu
- Budget: 56 crore
- Box office: 1.5 crore

Gandeevadhari Arjuna (transl. Gandiva-wielder Arjuna) is a 2023 Indian Telugu-language action thriller film directed by Praveen Sattaru. The film stars Varun Tej, Sakshi Vaidya and Vinay Rai, while Narain, Nassar, Vimala Raman, Manish Chaudhari, Ravi Varma, and Roshni Prakash play supporting roles.

Gandeevadhari Arjuna was released worldwide on 25 August 2023 to mixed reviews from critics.

== Plot ==
Arjun Varma, an ex-RAW operative, is in the UK for his mother's treatment and is assigned to protect the Indian MoEFCC Adityaraj Bahaddur, who became the prime target of Ranveer. During a chase, Shruti, a student gets killed by Ranveer's aides which prompts Arjun to retaliate. It is then revealed that Ranveer is Bahaddur's ex-son-in-law and the CEO of Clean & Green (C&G), a waste management firm and one of the frontrunners to become the UN-assigned watchdog from India for garbage management purposes. Bahaddur had learnt from Shruthi about C&G's crimes in the name of garbage management, and they killed her. To not get exposed and continue with his illegal operations, Ranveer wants to finish Bahaddur during the UN meet. Arjun learns that his mother was the victim of C&G's crimes, which prompts him to expose Ranveer. A cat-and-mouse game ensues in which Arjun manages to rescue Bahaddur's granddaughter Riya, who was kidnapped by Ranveer. Ranveer gets killed by the Interpol officers and Bahaddur's exposes C&G's and Ranveer's crimes, which leads to protest against the government to impose strict garbage laws.

== Cast ==
- Varun Tej as Arjun Varma, Ex-RAW operative
- Sakshi Vaidya as Ira, Civil Servant and Adityaraj's Personal Secretary
- Vinay Rai as Ranveer, Chairman of C&G and Adityaraj's ex-son-in-law
- Narain as Ajit Chandra, Interpol Officer
- Nassar as Adityaraj Bahadur, Minister of Environment and Climate Change
- Vimala Raman as Dr. Priya Bahadur, Adityaraj's daughter and Ranveer's ex-wife
- Manish Chaudhari as Rana, Adityaraj's bodyguard and Arjun's Superior
- Ravi Varma as Devender Singh "Dev", Ranveer's assistant
- Roshni Prakash as Sruthi, Southampton University student
- Abhinav Gomatam as Dinesh, Arjun's friend
- Matthew C. Applegate as the priest
- Vinay Nallakadi as Venkat
- Kalpa Latha as Radhika Varma, Arjun's mother
- Malhottra Shivam as Venkat, Ajit's assistant
- Veda Agrawal as Riya, Priya and Ranveer's daughter

== Soundtrack ==
Mickey J Meyer composed the soundtrack and musical score for the film. The first single "Nee Jathai" was released on 1 August 2023.

All lyrics are written by Rehaman.

Track listing
| No. | Title | Singer(s) | Length |
|---|---|---|---|
| 1. | "Nee Jathai" | Elvya, Nakul Abhyankar | 3:54 |
| 2. | "Gandeevadhari" | Harika Narayan | 3:01 |
| Total length: | | | 6:55 |

== Release and reception ==
The film was released on 25 August 2023. A critic from The Hindu wrote that "Watching Gandeevadhari Arjuna is like being privy to a polished mission that never soars. It is a well-intended thriller drama that could have benefited from smarter writing". A critic from The Indian Express rated with 2/5 stars and wrote that "Gandeevadhari Arjuna is a technically competent, soulless action movie. It may be a good watch for action fanatics only". Neeshita Nyayapati of The Times of India gave the film 2/5 stars, calling the story predictable and unexciting, while complimenting the cinematography. The movie began streaming on Netflix on 24 September 2023.

== Controversy ==
In a scene of the film, Nassar, who plays Adityaraj Bahaddur in the film, emotionally explains how exposure to toxic waste affects children. The film includes an unauthorized portion of a documentary on Evan Fasciano, a child with harlequin-type ichthyosis, which causes extremely dry skin to form plates with deep cracks. Prompted by a petition from the Foundation for Ichthyosis & Related Skin Types, B. V. S. N. Prasad apologizes for depicting children with ichthyosis as products of toxic waste exposure when the condition is typically hereditary. Rather than accepting the petition's demand to have the film removed from Netflix's streaming catalog, the film was edited to remove the images of ichthyosis patients.
