= Akhil Akkineni =

Indian actor (born 1994)

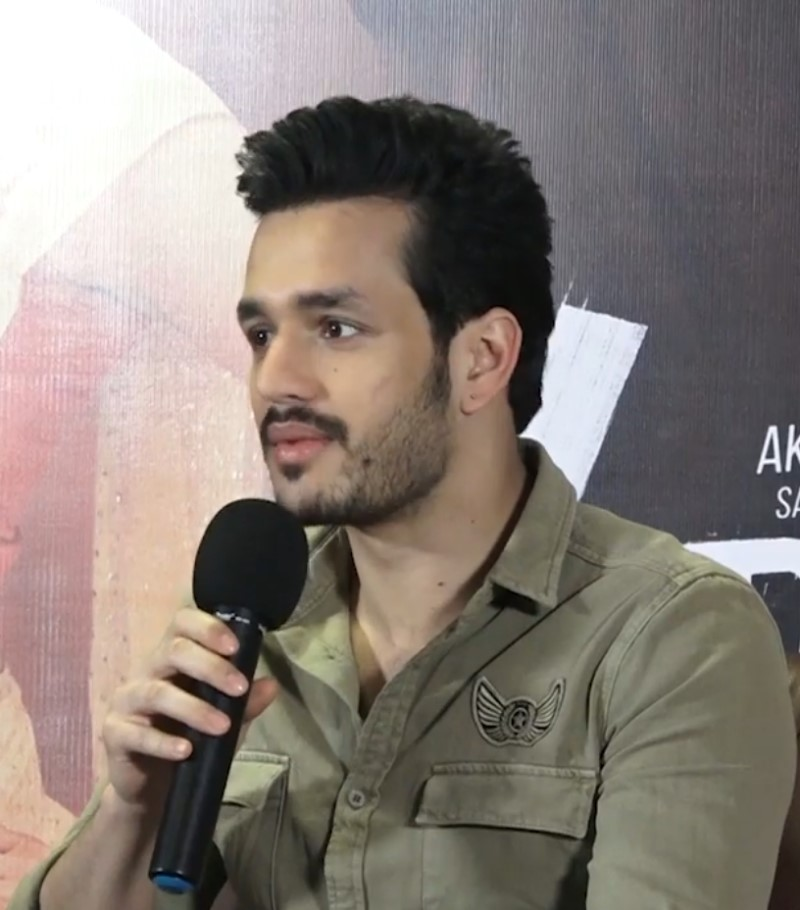
- Akkineni in 2017
- Born: 8 April 1994 (age 32); San Jose, California, United States
- Citizenship: American
- Education: University of South Florida
- Occupation: Actor
- Years active: 2015–present
- Spouse: Zainab Ravdjee (m. 2025)
- Parents: Nagarjuna (father); Amala (mother)
- Relatives: Naga Chaitanya (Half-brother)
- Family: See Daggubati–Akkineni family

Akhil Akkineni (born 8 April 1994) is an Indian actor known for his work in Telugu cinema. Born to actors Nagarjuna and Amala, he debuted as a child artist in the film Sisindri (1995), for which he won a Filmfare Special Award. Akkineni made his debut as a lead actor with Akhil (2015), which won him the Filmfare Award for Best Male Debut – South. He has since earned success with Hello (2017), Most Eligible Bachelor (2021) and Lenin (2026), the latter two being his highest grossers.

== Early life ==
Akkineni was born on 8 April 1994, in San Jose, California, United States, to actors Nagarjuna and Amala. He is of Telugu descent from his father's side, and has Bengali and Irish ancestry from his mother's side. He is the grandson of actor Akkineni Nageswara Rao, and half-brother of Naga Chaitanya.

Akkineni studied at Chaitanya Vidyalaya and later headed to Australia for two years. He returned to complete his studies at Oakridge International School, Hyderabad. He pursued acting as a career at age 16 and enrolled in an acting course at the Lee Strasberg Theatre and Film Institute in New York. He also holds a BBA from the University of South Florida.

Later in his teens, he pursued cricket and became a member in his father's team, in the 2010 celebrity Tollywood Trophy, which was a fundraiser for the Movie Artistes' Association. His match-winning half-century in the final against Venkatesh's Venky team, saw him secure the man-of-the-match and man-of-the-series awards. His performance saw him get called up to play for the Telugu Warriors in the inaugural Celebrity Cricket League (CCL) in 2011. Since then he has regularly participated in the CCL tournament, winning the 2016 edition as captain of his team.

== Career ==
As an infant, Akkineni debuted in his father's production, Shiva Nageswara Rao's comedy, Sisindri (1995), an Indian adaptation of Baby's Day Out (1994).

In 2014, Akkineni appeared in a cameo appearance in the family drama, Manam (2014), directed by Vikram Kumar. It featured three generations of actors from the Akkineni family. His cameo in the climax of the film was an instant rage with the audience. He described his shoot for the film alongside his grandfather, father and half-brother, as "nervous and exciting". Manam went on to become one of the most profitable Telugu films of 2014, whilst also considered to be one of the greatest Telugu films of all time. Critics dubbed the film a "classic" en route to it winning several awards, including Best Film at the Filmfare Awards. He subsequently went on to make appearances in several commercials, notably for Karbonn, Mountain Dew, and Titan.

Akkineni's debut film, as a full-fledged lead, was in Akhil (2015), directed by V. V. Vinayak. It was produced by Nithiin and his family. In order to prepare for the role, he enrolled in a stunt workshop with his personal trainer, Kicha, and attended workshops in Thailand, for two months. The film began production in December 2014 and featured him alongside fellow debutante, Sayesha Saigal. The film opened to a mixed response, and despite high expectations, it was a flop at the box-office. Following this, he went on a two-year hiatus.

In 2017, his second film, Hello (2017), directed by Vikram Kumar, was released along with Middle Class Abbayi and turned out to be a below-average grosser at the box-office, despite garnering generally positive reviews. Following that, Akkineni's third film was Mr. Majnu (2019), directed by Venky Atluri and co-starring Niddhi Agerwal. Despite a great pre-release buzz and successful album, it opened to mixed reviews upon release. It eventually bombed commercially, becoming Akkineni's third consecutive failure.

In October 2021, his fourth film, the rom com, Most Eligible Bachelor was released. It co-starred Pooja Hegde and was directed by Bommarillu and Parugu fame, Bhaskar. It was produced by Bunny Vas and Vasu Varma, under GA2. It became a hit and gave Akkineni a long-awaited box office success.

Akkineni's next film, Agent, directed by Surender Reddy and produced by Anil Sunkara, released on 28 April 2023. It was made on a huge budget of 80 crores. Upon release, it received highly negative reviews from both the critics and audience, alike. It had an extremely low opening and was a commercial disaster.

His next film, Lenin, was released to decent reviews and became his biggest blockbuster in his career. It is considered his turning point and proved his acting skills.

== Personal life ==
In 2016, Akkineni was engaged to Shriya Bhupal, granddaughter of the business tycoon, G. V. Krishna Reddy. Their wedding was planned for 2017. However, it was later called off for undisclosed reasons.

He got engaged to Mumbai-based artist Zainab Ravdjee, the daughter of industrialist Zulfi Ravdjee, on 26 November 2024. The couple tied the knot on 6 June 2025, in a traditional Telugu wedding ceremony held in Hyderabad.

== Filmography ==
Key
†	Denotes films that have not yet been released

List of films and roles
Year	Title	Role(s)	Notes	Ref.
1995	Sisindri	Sisindri	Child artist	
2014	Manam	Akhil	Cameo appearance	
2015	Akhil	Akhil	Debut as adult lead actor	
2016	Aatadukundam Raa	Himself	Special appearance in title song	
2017	Hello	Avinash / Seenu	Also singer for "Yevevo"	
2019	Mr. Majnu	Vikram "Vicky" Krishna		
2021	Most Eligible Bachelor	Harsha		
2023	Agent	Ramakrishna "Ricky" / "Wild Saala"		
2026	Lenin	Lenin		

== Awards and nominations ==
Akhil Akkineni awards and nominations
Awards and nominations
Award	Wins	Nominations

Totals (Note: Certain award groups do not simply award one winner. They acknowledge several different recipients, have runners-up, and have third place. Since this is a specific recognition and is different from losing an award, runner-up mentions are considered wins in this award tally. For simplification and to avoid errors, each award in this list has been presumed to have had a prior nomination.)
- Wins: 6
- Nominations: 6

List of awards and nominations
Year	Award	Category	Film	Result	Ref.
1995	43rd Filmfare Awards South	Special Award (Child actor)	Sisindri	Won	
2016	63rd Filmfare Awards South	Best Male Debut – South	Akhil	Won	
2016	5th South Indian International Movie Awards	Best Male Debut – Telugu	Akhil	Won	
2016	CineMAA Awards 2016	Best Male Debut	Akhil	Won	
2016	14th Santosham Film Awards	Best Debut Actor	Akhil	Won	
2019	TSR – TV9 National Film Awards	Special Jury Award	Hello	Won	
