= Pooja Hegde =

Indian actress (born 1990)

- Hegde in 2025
- Born: 13 October 1990 (age 36); Bombay, Maharashtra, India
- Education: M. M. K. College (B.Com)
- Occupation: Actress
- Years active: 2012–present

Pooja Hegde (/puːdʒɑː hɛɡdeɪ/; born 13 October 1990) is an Indian actress who primarily works in Telugu, Hindi and Tamil films. One of the highest-paid actresses of South Indian cinema, Hegde is a recipient of four SIIMA Awards along with four Filmfare Awards South nominations.

After participating in the 2010 Miss Universe India beauty pageant, Hegde made her film debut with the Tamil film Mugamoodi (2012). She gained recognition in Telugu cinema with roles in Oka Laila Kosam and Mukunda (both 2014), and achieved wider success with the action comedy DJ: Duvvada Jagannadham (2017). Her Bollywood debut came with Mohenjo Daro (2016) opposite Hrithik Roshan, followed by a commercial success in the ensemble comedy Housefull 4 (2019).

Hegde established herself in Telugu films through commercially successful films such as Aravinda Sametha Veera Raghava (2018), Maharshi (2019), and Ala Vaikunthapurramuloo (2020) and Most Eligible Bachelor (2021). This success was followed by several poorly received films, following which Hegde found success with Retro (2025).

== Early life and work ==
Pooja Hegde was born on 13 October 1990, and states she was raised in Mumbai, Maharashtra in a Tulu-speaking Bunt family. Her father, Manjunath Hegde, is a criminal lawyer and her mother, Latha Hegde, is an immunologist and entrepreneur. They are originally from Udupi, Karnataka. Her elder brother Rishabh Hegde, is an orthopaedic surgeon. Besides Tulu, she is fluent in English, Hindi, Marathi and Kannada. She later learnt Telugu following a career in Telugu cinema. She considers Bengaluru as her home town, and maintains strong connections there. She did her schooling in Maneckji Cooper Education Trust School, Mumbai. She went to M. M. K. College, graduating with a Bachelor of Commerce degree. She has trained in classical dance and music, including Bharatanatyam.

A representative from Miss India met Hegde at one of her college events and suggested her to participate in the pageant. Hegde competed in the Miss India 2009 competition, but was eliminated in an early round despite winning the Miss India Talented 2009 honour. In 2010, she participated in the Femina Miss India South 2010 pageant, securing the runner-up position and earning the Miss India South Glamorous Hair 2010 title. Later that same year, she achieved the position of second runner-up in the Miss Universe India 2010 pageant. She rejected offers of several projects from big production banners over three years before debuting in Mugamoodi. She accepted the project by her mother's suggestion.

== Career ==
=== Early work (2012–2017) ===
After noticing still photographs of her pageant win, Mysskin offered Hegde her debut in his Tamil superhero film Mugamoodi (2012) opposite Jiiva. She portrayed Shakthi, a fun-loving girl who inspires the male lead to change his outlook on society. Hegde practised Tamil dialogues for the film by writing and memorising words in English, adding similarities between Tamil and her mother tongue Tulu.

Prior to its release, the film garnered high expectations due to its novel theme of a superhero in Tamil cinema, and had a strong opening at the box office in August 2012. She earned nominations for the SIIMA Award for Best Female Debut – Tamil and Filmfare Award for Best Female Debut – South.

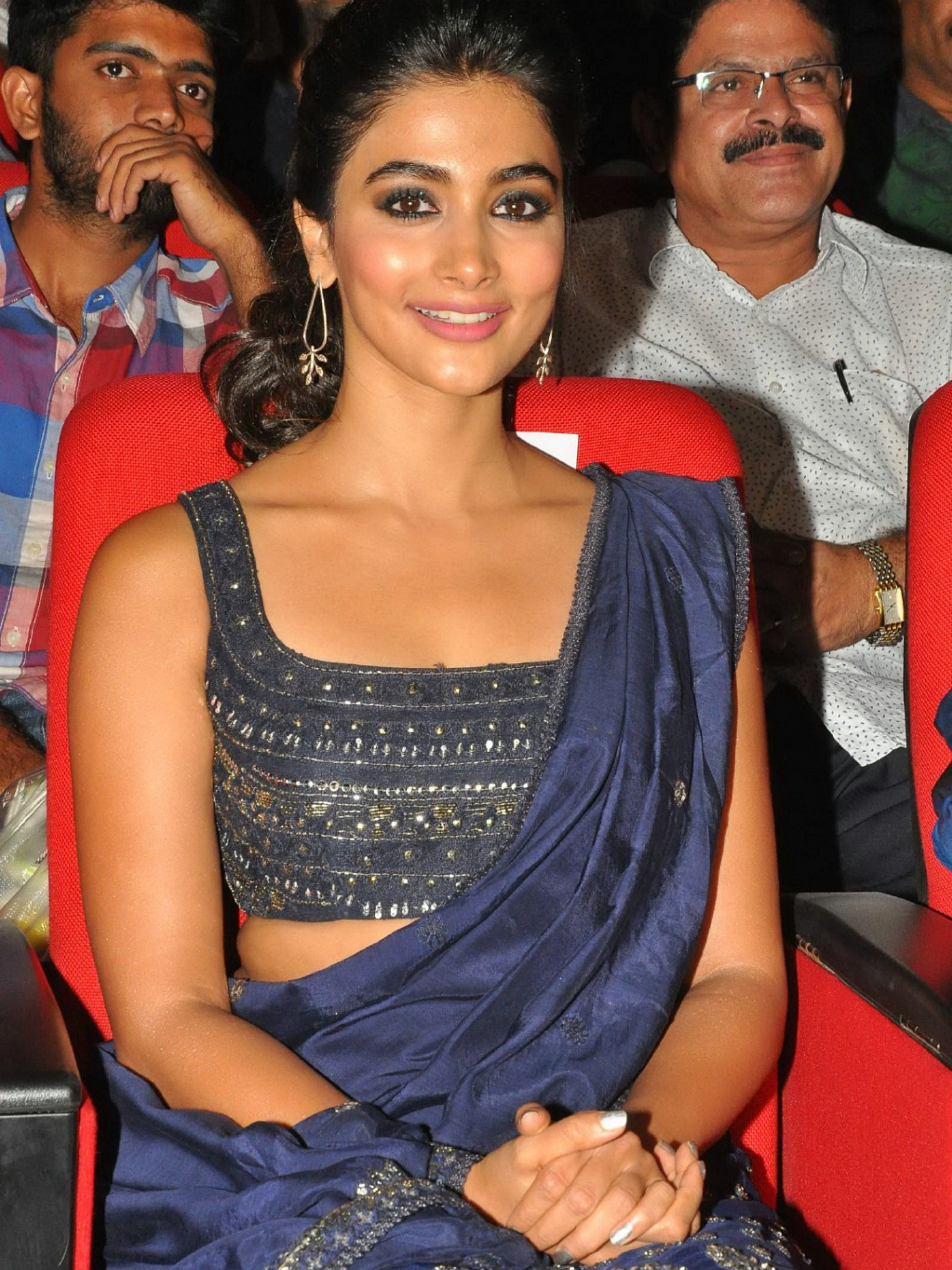
Hegde in 2017

Expanding to Telugu cinema in 2014, Hegde starred opposite Naga Chaitanya in the romantic comedy Oka Laila Kosam. The success of the production house Annapurna Studios and director Vijay Konda's previous ventures prompted her to sign the project. She learned Telugu language to play the female lead. Her portrayal of Nandana received positive reception. Ranjani Rajendra of The Hindu was appreciative of Hegde's screen presence, while Suresh Kavirayani of Deccan Chronicle lauded her debut. Around the same time, she was nominated for Filmfare Award for Best Actress – Telugu. The film proved to be a commercial success. Hegde was next cast opposite Varun Tej in Srikanth Addala's drama Mukunda. Reviewers of the film were generally pleased with the chemistry between the lead pair. Hegde has said that the song "Gopikamma" marked a major breakthrough in her career. It became another successful financial venture for her.

In 2016, Hegde made her Hindi film film debut as the female lead opposite Hrithik Roshan in Ashutosh Gowariker's period film Mohenjo Daro, set against the backdrop of the Indus Valley Civilisation. She was selected after Gowariker's wife, Sunita Gowariker, spotted her in an advertisement and called her for an audition. Lisa Tsering of The Hollywood Reporter dismissed her performance as "forgettable blandness". In 2017, she starred in Harish Shankar's Telugu action comedy DJ: Duvvada Jagannadham, opposite Allu Arjun. Hegde described her role as an outgoing and modern girl, unlike her previous roles in Telugu films, which she considered traditional. Manoj Kumar R from The Indian Express wrote that "Hegde has convincingly done the given job that is to look stunning in every frame of the film". DJ opened to commercial success grossing over ₹1.5 billion (US$16 million) emerging as one of the highest-grossing Telugu films of 2017.

=== Commercial success and fluctuations (2018–2024) ===
In 2018, Hegde featured in three Telugu films. She began the year with an item number "Jigelu Rani" for the period action Rangasthalam. She next starred opposite Bellamkonda Sreenivas in the fantasy action Saakshyam, portraying the role of a middle-class Brahmin girl who was a spiritual leader. Murali Krishna C H found that she "gets more screen time in this film compared to her last outing DJ and she does a good job". In her final appearance that year, she played the titular character in Aravinda Sametha Veera Raghava directed by Trivikram Srinivas, where she dubbed for herself. She played Aravinda, who significantly influenced Veera Raghava Reddy (N. T. Rama Rao Jr.), to challenge the deep-rooted enmity and seek a path of non-violence and self-discovery. Sangeetha Devi Dundoo from The Hindu credited her role as "impressive" and wrote that she "gets to be more than a glam doll and enjoys her role". The film was the second-highest-grossing Telugu film of the year and grossed over ₹1.8 billion (US$19 million) worldwide attaining a blockbuster status.

In 2019, Hegde's first film was Vamshi Paidipally's Maharshi co-starring Mahesh Babu. Her second Telugu film that year was the Harish Shankar-directed Gaddalakonda Ganesh, a remake of the 2014 Tamil-language film Jigarthanda, co-starring Varun Tej and Atharvaa. Lauding her chemistry with Tej, Hemanth Kumar noted that she "fits into her character quite well". She suffered sunburn during the filming of the song "Elluvochi Godaramma", in the middle of the river at Yanam. Hegde returned to Bollywood after a gap of three years with Sajid Nadiadwala's comedy film Housefull 4, directed by Farhad Samji, the fourth instalment of the Housefull franchise, featuring her as Rajkumari Mala and Pooja (reincarnated). The film received predominantly negative reviews, but was one of the highest grossers of the year, earning ₹2.9 billion (US$31 million).

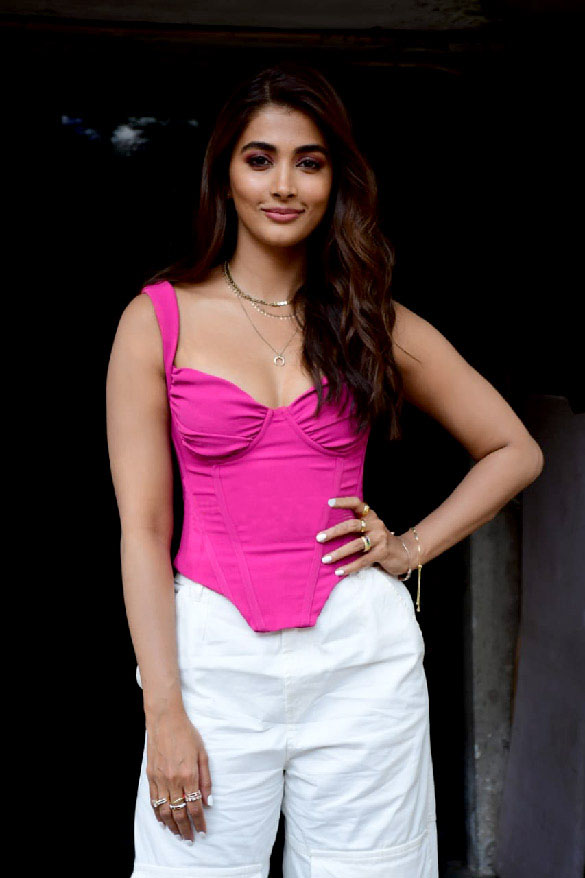
Hegde in 2022

In 2020, she reunited with both Arjun and Trivikram in the Telugu action drama film Ala Vaikunthapurramuloo, in which she portrayed the role of a travel company head Amulya, a self-made businesswoman. Neeshita Nyayapati noted that "Hegde manages to bring in spunk into a character that is nothing more than a manic pixie dream girl, but she sure is a delight to watch on-screen". Her performance fetched her several awards, including the SIIMA Award for Best Actress – Telugu. Hegde's dance performance in the song "Butta Bomma" received wide response. The film became the first South Indian film to achieve ₹2 billion (US$21 million) nett in single language and was ranked among the highest-grossing Telugu films of all time, grossing over ₹2.8 billion (US$30 million). In 2021, Hegde starred in Most Eligible Bachelor, directed by Bommarillu Bhaskar opposite Akhil Akkineni, in which she played the role of a stand-up comedian. To prepare for the role, she met several stand-up comedians to learn how they prepare their punchlines. Her performance in the film received positive reception and won her another SIIMA Best Actress – Telugu award. Ram Venkat Srikar from Cinema Express lauded her well-written role and her performance, which does justice to that writing.

She began 2022 by playing the lead opposite Prabhas in the multilingual period romance film Radhe Shyam, directed by Radha Krishna Kumar. Set in 1970s Europe, the film is a love saga of two individuals with different approaches to life: Vikramaditya (Prabhas), who follows fate and destiny, falls for Dr. Prerana (Hegde), who deeply believes in the power of science. It is one of the most expensive Indian films produced. Monika Rawal Kukreja praised her performance and noted that "she performs the emotional sequences with a lot of maturity and conviction". The film broke record for the highest opening-day earnings, but failed to recoup its ₹3 billion (US$32 million) budget. Hegde next starred alongside Vijay in the Tamil action comedy Beast, directed by Nelson. Produced by Sun Pictures, the film marked her return to Tamil cinema after a gap of 9 years. Jose K George of The Week wrote that she looks pretty and does a decent job. Hegde's #ArabicKuthuChallenge went viral on social media, and many recreated her signature step. Despite mixed reviews, the film broke several box office records and was a commercial success. In the same year, she took on a brief role in the Telugu-language action drama film Acharya, starring Chiranjeevi and Charan. She performed her second dance number in the film, F3: Fun and Frustration alongside Venkatesh and Tej in the party song "Life Ante Itta Vundaala". In her final release of 2022, Hegde played one of the female leads opposite Ranveer Singh in Rohit Shetty's poorly received Hindi period comedy drama film Cirkus, an adaptation of the William Shakespeare's play The Comedy of Errors.

In 2023, she starred opposite Salman Khan in Kisi Ka Bhai Kisi Ki Jaan, directed by Farhad Samji. She played the role of a Telugu girl who transforms the life of the protective and solitary Bhaijaan (played by Khan). Ronak Kotecha of The Times of India, wrote, "Pooja has a meaty role, which she pulls off confidently, but could have dialed down over-the-top filmy antics." The film also underperformed commercially.

=== Recent work (2025–present) ===
Following a year hiatus, Hegde began 2025 by playing a journalist Diya opposite Shahid Kapoor in the Hindi action thriller Deva. Vinamra Mathur from Firstpost stated that she was "severely underutilized". It had poor box-office returns. She next played Rukmini, a veterinarian opposite Suriya in Karthik Subbaraj's Tamil film Retro. Avinash Ramachandran of The Indian Express was appreciative of her "convincing performance". The film emerged a commercial success. Later, she made a special appearance in the Tamil film Coolie, starring Rajinikanth and directed by Lokesh Kanagaraj. Her glamorous performance in the dance number "Monica" became widely popular and earned praise from Italian actress Monica Bellucci.

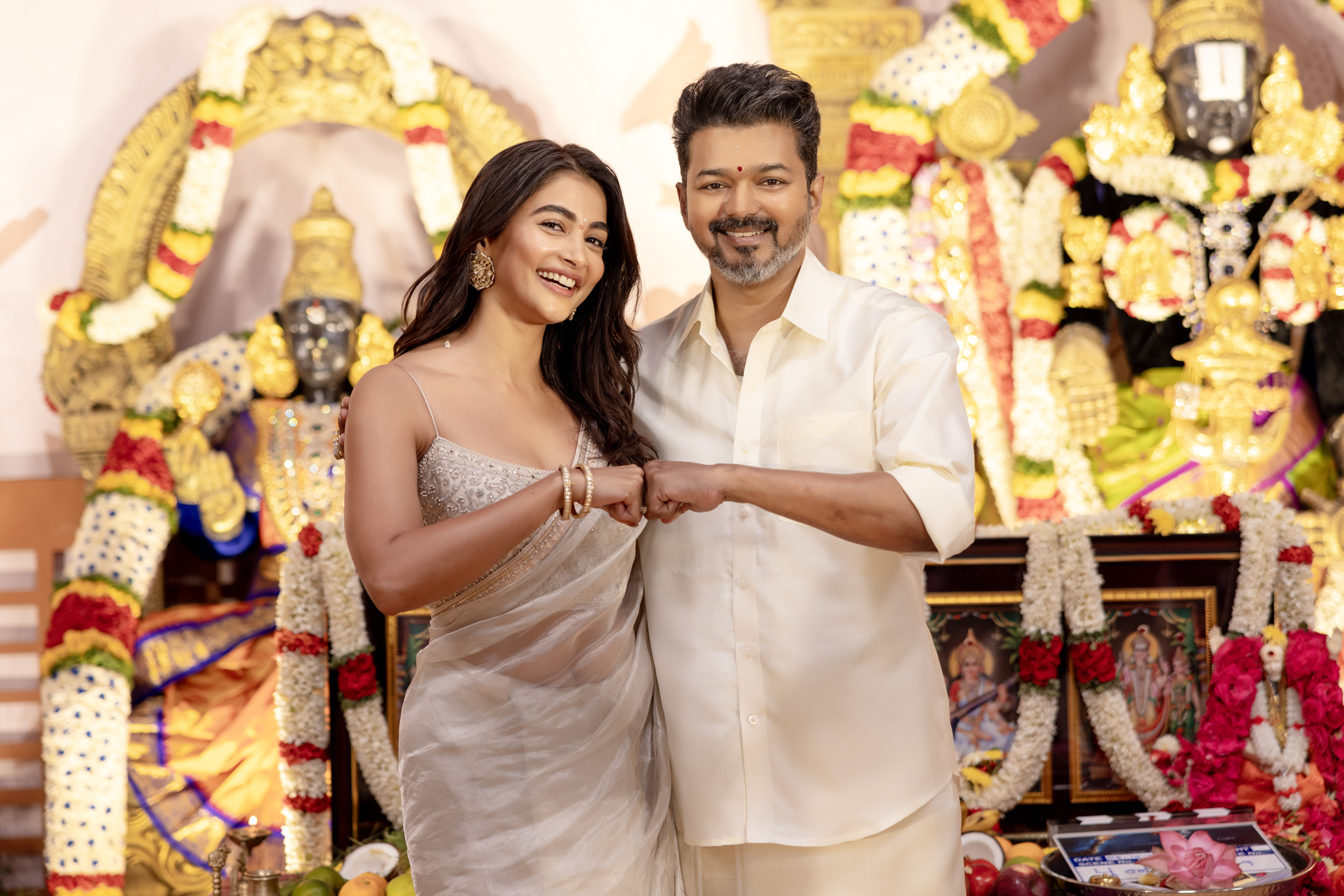
Hegde with C. Joseph Vijay at the muhurat puja of latter's final film Jana Nayagan

In 2026, Hegde starred alongside Varun Dhawan in Hai Jawani Toh Ishq Hona Hai. She then reunited with C. Joseph Vijay for his final film Jana Nayagan. The film was scheduled for release on 9 January 2026, but was delayed due to censorship issues. It was subsequently leaked on piracy websites on 9 April 2026, prior to its official theatrical release. Ultimately, opened in theatres on 23 July. Despite the leak and delays, the film went on to rank among the highest-grossing Tamil films of all time.

She will next star in the Kanchana film series sequel Kanchana 4 alongside Raghava Lawrence, and opposite Dulquer Salmaan in the romantic film Sri Sri.

== Other work ==
Hegde supports various causes through her foundation, "All About Love", which focuses on providing education and healthcare support to underprivileged children across India. She contributes a portion of her earnings to fund the foundation's operations. Hegde has been vocal on various topics, including women's rights, gender equality, and addressing the gender pay gap. She was honoured as the "Star on the Rise" at Femina and Mamaearth's Beautiful Indians 2023 for her philanthropic efforts.

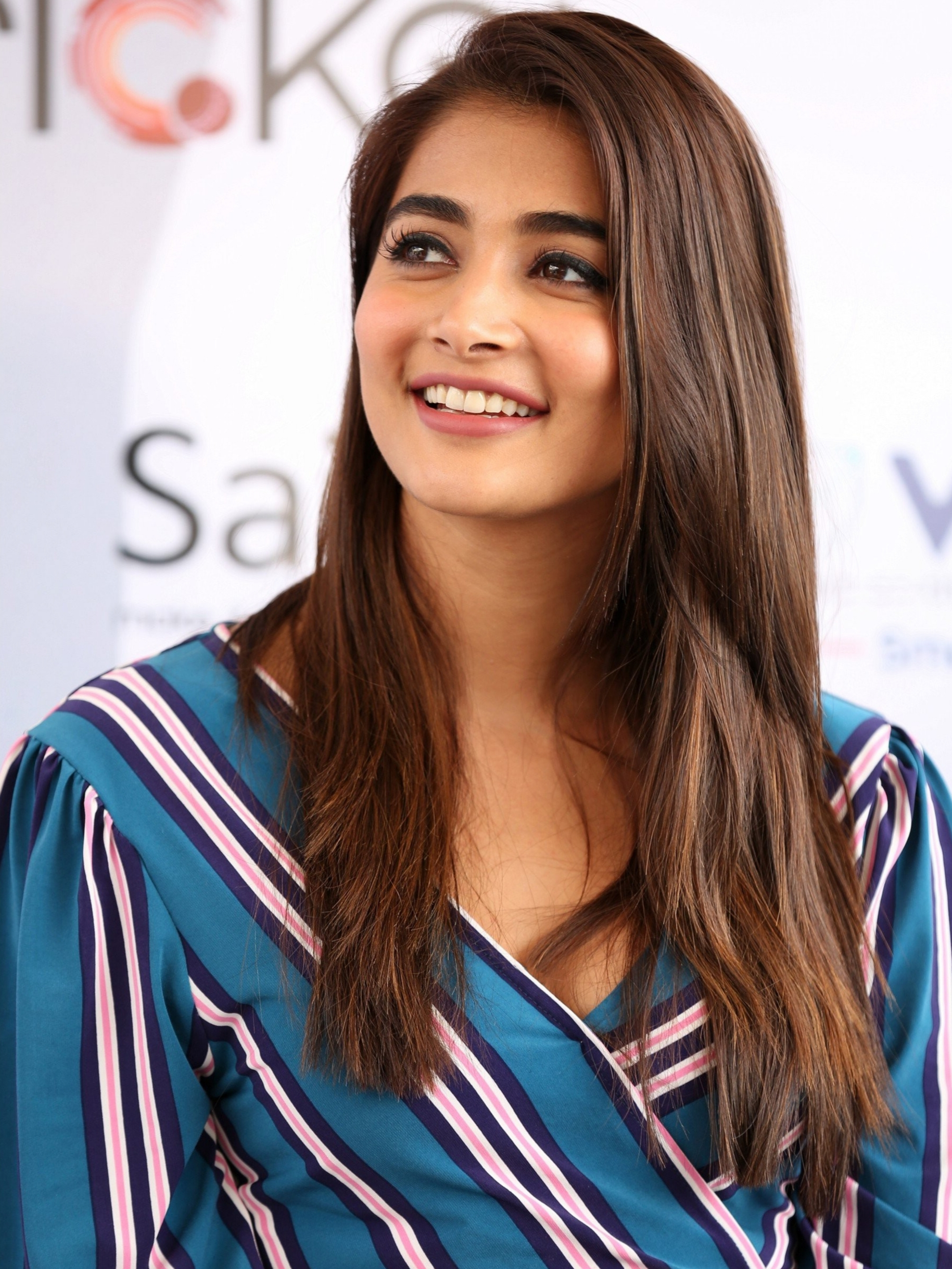
Hegde at Cancer Crusaders Invitation Cup golf tournament

In 2020, Hegde collaborated with Drools on a campaign to support stray animals, with Drools providing six months' worth of food for homeless strays and Hegde contributing an additional six months' supply. In 2017, she covered the full medical expenses for two children at the cancer ward of Tata Memorial Hospital, Mumbai. In 2020, she participated in a charity fundraiser organised by the Cure Foundation for children with cancer and supported the sixth biennial Cancer Crusaders Invitation Cup golf tournament in Hyderabad to raise funds. In 2021, she launched the 'Hamari Suraksha' digital campaign with the Women and Child Safety Organisation (WCSO) at Women Power Line 1090 in Gomti Nagar, Lucknow, promoting awareness of the helpline with hashtags #HumForHer and #FarqPadtaHai. During the first and second waves of COVID-19, Hegde provided medical assistance and essential supplies through her foundation. In May 2020, she partnered with photographer Atul Kasbekar and Tring India for a PPE Kit drive, donating 20,000 PPE kits to over 50 hospitals across India. In 2021, during the second wave, she organised the distribution of a month's rations to 100 families.

Hegde has supported child cancer patients by covering medical bills and provided financial aid to a family whose primary breadwinner was in a coma. Her foundation also donated to a children's hospital in Mangalore to support children with artificial limbs. On 5 June 2024, for World Environment Day, Hegde led Garnier's Green Beauty beach clean-up, working as a sanitation worker to restore garbage-laden areas in Mumbai, including Juhu Beach, and encouraged public participation in maintaining cleanliness.

Hegde has participated in numerous world tours and concerts, including the "Da-Bangg Tour" with Salman Khan. She performed at Expo 2020 in Dubai in February 2022 and in Kolkata in May 2023 as part of the tour. In 2025, she performed at the opening ceremony of the 2025 International League T20 at Dubai International Cricket Stadium alongside Shahid Kapoor. She has also performed at the SIIMA, Filmfare, and Zee Cine award ceremonies. In 2018, Hegde was on the mentors' panel of the Miss India pageant. She also served as a judge at Miss World 2023.

== In the media ==
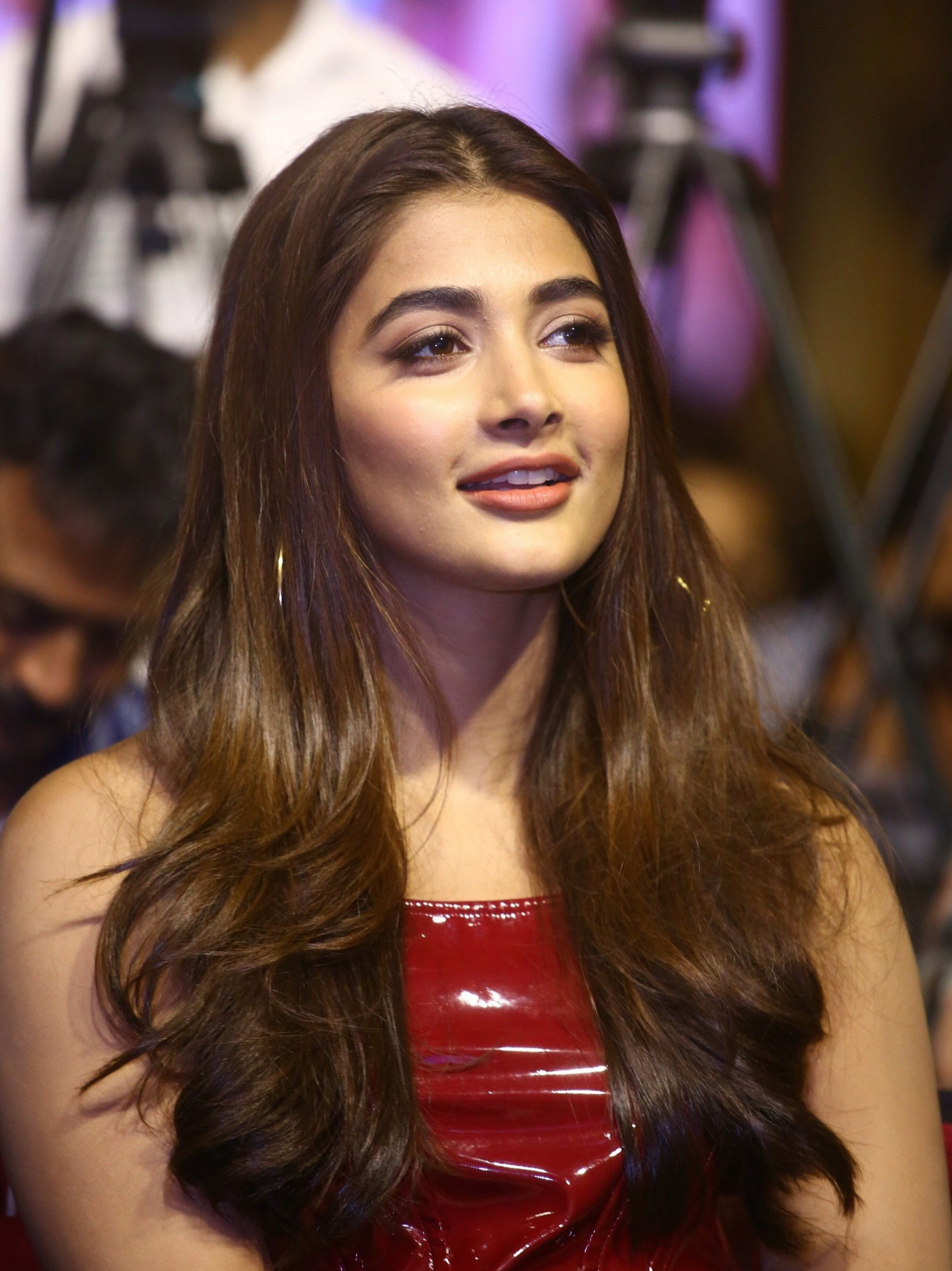
Hegde in 2022

Hegde is recognised as one of the highest-paid South Indian actress. Her journey from a beauty pageant runner-up in 2010 to a leading actress has been marked by her confidence and determination, as noted by Rupam Jain of Indulge Express. She stood at the 7th place on Forbes India's Most Influential Stars on Instagram in South Cinema for the year 2021. She is one of the most-followed South Indian actresses on Instagram. Nibandh Vinod of News18 noted, "With her charming screen presence and versatility, Pooja has become a favorite among audiences and filmmakers alike." Abhilasha Cherukuri of The New Indian Express described her as "one of the very few actors to successfully balance multiple industries", cementing her status as a pan-Indian star. Suman Sharma of Filmfare called her "an epitome of beauty" whose "ethereal looks are mesmerising", emphasising her ability to balance a demanding career across industries.

Hegde is described in the media, as a style icon. Dayle Pereira of NDTV noted that "her aesthetic falls on the more minimal side", citing her ability to make simple outfits look chic. Maaahi Shah of Elle called her "the ultimate fighter" who finds parts of herself in her style choices. She has frequently featured in Times' Most Desirable Woman list. She was the Hyderabad Times' Most Desirable Woman of 2017. In the same list, she stood 5th in 2019 and 3rd in 2020. She was one of the most searched actresses on Google and ranked among the most searched Asians in 2022. Hegde is a prominent celebrity endorser for brands including Citra, pTron, Garnier, IGP, Maaza and Bhima Jewellers.

== Filmography ==
Key
†	Denotes films that have not yet been released

Year	Title	Role(s)	Language	Notes	Ref.
2012	Mugamoodi	Shakthi	Tamil		
2014	Oka Laila Kosam	Nandana	Telugu		
2014	Mukunda	Gopika	Telugu		
2016	Mohenjo Daro	Chaani	Hindi		
2017	DJ: Duvvada Jagannadham	Pooja	Telugu		
2018	Rangasthalam	Jigelu Rani	Telugu	Special appearance in the song "Jigelu Rani"	
2018	Saakshyam	Soundarya Lahari	Telugu		
2018	Aravinda Sametha Veera Raghava	Aravinda	Telugu		
2019	Maharshi	Pooja Mahalakshmi	Telugu		
2019	Gaddalakonda Ganesh	Sridevi	Telugu		
2019	Housefull 4	Rajkumari Mala / Pooja Thakral	Hindi		
2020	Ala Vaikunthapurramuloo	Amulya	Telugu		
2021	Most Eligible Bachelor	Vibha	Telugu		
2022	Radhe Shyam	Dr. Prerana Chakravarthy	Telugu; Hindi	Bilingual film	
2022	Beast	Preethi	Tamil		
2022	Acharya	Neelambari	Telugu		
2022	F3: Fun and Frustration	Herself	Telugu	Special appearance in the song "Life Ante Itta Vundaala"	
2022	Cirkus	Mala	Hindi		
2023	Kisi Ka Bhai Kisi Ki Jaan	Bhagyalaxmi Gundamaneni	Hindi		
2025	Deva	Diya Sathaye	Hindi		
2025	Retro	Dr. Rukmini "Rukku"	Tamil		
2025	Coolie	Monica	Tamil	Special appearance	
2026	Hai Jawani Toh Ishq Hona Hai	Preet Randhawa	Hindi		
2026	Jana Nayagan	Kayal	Tamil		
2026	Kanchana 4 †	TBA	Tamil	Filming	
2026	Sri Sri †	TBA	Telugu	Filming	

== Accolades ==
Year	Award	Category	Work	Result	Ref.
2013	Norway Tamil Film Festival Awards	Best Newcomer Actress	Mugamoodi	Won	
2013	Ananda Vikatan Cinema Awards	Best Debut Actress	Mugamoodi	Nominated	
2013	60th Filmfare Awards South	Best Female Debut	Mugamoodi	Nominated	
2013	7th Vijay Awards	Best Debut Actress	Mugamoodi	Nominated	
2013	7th Vijay Awards	Favourite Heroine	Mugamoodi	Nominated	
2013	2nd South Indian International Movie Awards	Best Female Debut – Tamil	Mugamoodi	Nominated	
2015	Santosham Film Awards	Best Debut Heroine	Oka Laila Kosam	Won	
2015	CineMAA Awards	Best Female Debut	Oka Laila Kosam	Nominated	
2015	4th South Indian International Movie Awards	Best Female Debut – Telugu	Oka Laila Kosam	Nominated	
2015	62nd Filmfare Awards South	Best Actress – Telugu	Oka Laila Kosam	Nominated	
2016	Stardust Awards	Superstar of Tomorrow – Female	Mohenjo Daro	Nominated	
2017	Zee Telugu Golden Awards	Entertainer Of The Year (Female)	DJ: Duvvada Jagannadham	Won	
2017	Zee Telugu Golden Awards	Favourite Heroine of the Year	DJ: Duvvada Jagannadham	Won	
2019	66th Filmfare Awards South	Best Actress – Telugu	Aravinda Sametha Veera Raghava	Nominated	
2019	Sakshi Excellence Awards	Most Popular Actress of the Year	Aravinda Sametha Veera Raghava	Won	
2020	9th South Indian International Movie Awards	Best Actress – Telugu	Maharshi	Nominated	
2020	Zee Cine Awards Telugu	Favourite Actress	Maharshi	Won	
2021	9th South Indian International Movie Awards	Best Actress – Telegu	Ala Vaikunthapurramuloo	Won	
2021	20th Santosham Film Awards	Best Actress	Ala Vaikunthapurramuloo	Won	
2021	7th Sakshi Excellence Awards	Most Popular Actress of the Year	Ala Vaikunthapurramuloo	Won	
2022	67th Filmfare Awards South	Best Actress – Telugu	Ala Vaikunthapurramuloo	Nominated	
2022	10th South Indian International Movie Awards	Best Actress – Telugu	Most Eligible Bachelor	Won	
2022	10th South Indian International Movie Awards	Best Actress Critics – Telugu	Most Eligible Bachelor	Won	
2022	10th South Indian International Movie Awards	Youth Icon (Female)	—N/a	Won	
2022	21st Santosham Film Awards	Best Actress Award	Most Eligible Bachelor, Radhe Shyam	Won	
2023	Edison Awards	Favourite Actress	Beast	Nominated	
2023	Bollywood Hungama Style Icons	Most Stylish Mould Breaking Star (Female)	—N/a	Nominated	
2023	Bollywood Hungama Style Icons	Most Stylish Trend Setter (Female)	—N/a	Nominated	
2023	Bollywood Hungama Style Icons	Most Stylish Haute Stepper	—N/a	Nominated	
2023	Bollywood Hungama Style Icons	Most Stylish Glam Star	—N/a	Nominated	
2023	Pinkvilla Style Icons Awards	Stylish Game Changer – Female	—N/a	Won	
2023	Lokmat Stylish Awards	Most Stylish Youth Icon (Female)	—N/a	Won	
2024	Bollywood Hungama Style Icons	Most Stylish Versatile Talent of the Year	—N/a	Won	
