= Paramasivam Natarajan =

Indian photochemist (1940-2016)

- Born: 17 September 1940; Tamil Nadu, India
- Died: 18 March 2016 (aged 75); Chennai, Tamil Nadu, India
- Education: University of Madras; Banaras Hindu University; University of Southern California; Wayne State University
- Known for: Studies in photochemistry
- Awards: 1984 Shanti Swarup Bhatnagar Prize; 1984 GoT Best Teacher Award; 1999 ICS Acharya P. C. Ray Memorial Award
- Scientific career
- Fields: Photochemistry; Laser chemistry
- Workplaces: University of Madras; NGM College, Pollachi; Banaras Hindu University; Jawaharlal Institute of Postgraduate Medical Education and Research; University of Southern California; Central Salt and Marine Chemicals Research Institute; National Centre for Ultrafast Process
- Doctoral advisor: John F. Endicott

Paramasivam Natarajan (17 September 1940 – 18 March 2016) was an Indian photochemist, the INSA Senior Scientist at the National Centre for Ultrafast Process of the University of Madras and the director of Central Salt and Marine Chemicals Research Institute (CSMCRI) of the Council of Scientific and Industrial Research. He was known for his research on photochemistry of co-ordination compounds and macromolecular dye coatings for stabilization of electrodes. He was an elected fellow of the Indian National Science Academy, International Union of Pure and Applied Chemistry (IUPAC) and the Indian Academy of Sciences. The Council of Scientific and Industrial Research, the apex agency of the Government of India for scientific research, awarded him the Shanti Swarup Bhatnagar Prize for Science and Technology, one of the highest Indian science awards, in 1984, for his contributions to chemical sciences.

== Biography ==
Born on 17 September 1940 in the south Indian state of Tamil Nadu, Paramasivam Natarajan graduated in chemistry from the University of Madras in 1959. He started his career as a lecturer at the Government Arts College of the Madras University in 1959 but later moved to the NGM College, Pollachi in 1963. The next year, he joined the Banaras Hindu University (BHU) as a CSIR Junior Research fellow and during the tenure of the fellowship, obtained his master's degree in 1963. After continuing at BHU for a year more, he became a lecturer at the Jawaharlal Institute of Postgraduate Medical Education and Research (JIPMER) where he stayed till 1970. Later he went to the US as a teaching assistant at the University of Southern California, simultaneously pursuing his doctoral studies under the guidance of John F. Endicott. He secured a PhD in 1971 and did his post doctoral studies under his PhD guide, Endicott, at Wayne State University as the latter had moved to the Michigan-based university by that time.

Natarajan returned to India in 1974 and joined his alma mater, Madras University, as a reader of the department of physical chemistry. In 1977, he became a professor in charge of the Post Graduate Centre of the university in Tiruchirappalli. In 1982, he returned to the university headquarters in Chennai as the head of the department of inorganic chemistry. In 1991, he was deputed by the university as the director of Central Salt and Marine Chemicals Research Institute (CSMCRI), a post he held till 1996. After the completion of the assignment at CSMCRI, he resumed his duties at the university and became a senior professor in 1998. At time of his superannuation in 2001, he held the post of an INSA Senior Scientist at the National Centre for Ultrafast Process of the university and served as a member of the university syndicate.

Natarajan was married to Sivabagyam and the couple had two daughters, Shiva Sukanthi and Shakthi. He died on 18 March 2016, at the age of 75, survived by his wife, children and their families.

== Legacy ==
Focusing his research on photochemistry, Natarajan studied various areas of the discipline such as polymer dynamics using fluorescence, flash photolysis studies using picosecond and femtosecond lasers and solar energy conversion. He demonstrated that micromolecular dye coatings of electrodes used in photoelectrochemical cells returned high current density. This led to his subsequent studies of solar energy conversion using chemically modified electrodes. He published his research in peer-reviewed journals including Nature, Journal of the American Chemical Society, Journal of Physical Chemistry A, Inorganic Chemistry and Chemical Communications for a total of 107 articles. (Note: Please see Selected bibliography section) He was granted patents for four of his findings. He mentored over 30 doctoral scholars and was associated with a number of journals as their editorial board member. He also was on a number of government committees including those of the Department of Science and Technology and the Council of Scientific and Industrial Research and delivered several featured talks and orations.

== Awards and honors ==
The Council of Scientific and Industrial Research awarded Natarajan the Shanti Swarup Bhatnagar Prize, one of the highest Indian science awards, in 1984. He received the Best Teacher Award from the Government of Tamil Nadu the same year. In 1999, he was awarded the Acharya P.C. Ray Memorial Award by the Indian Chemical Society. He held the National Lectureship and the National Fellowship of the University Grants Commission of India during 1986–87 and 1989–91 respectively. Sir M. Visweshwaraiah Chair of the University of Mysore (1999), Pandit Jawaharlal Nehru Chair of the University of Hyderabad (2004), Raja Ramanna Fellowship of the Department of Science and Technology (2006–09) and the senior scientist professorship of the Indian National Science Academy (at the time of his death) were some of the other notable positions he held. He was an elected fellow of the Indian Academy of Sciences, Indian National Science Academy, International Union of Pure and Applied Chemistry, Tamil Nadu Academy of Sciences, Society of Bio-Sciences and Gujarat Academy of Sciences and a member of Sigma Xi: The Scientific Research Society.

== Selected bibliography ==
- Raja, Chinnappan; Ananthanarayanan, Krishnamoorthy; Natarajan, Paramasivam (2006). "Studies on the photophysical characteristics of poly(carboxylic acid)s bound protoporphyrin IX and metal complexes of protoporphyrin IX". European Polymer Journal. 42 (3): 495–506. Bibcode:2006EurPJ..42..495R. doi:10.1016/j.eurpolymj.2005.09.009.
- Ananthanarayanan, K.; Selvaraju, C.; Natarajan, P. (2007). "Novel excited state proton transfer reaction observed for proflavine encapsulated in the channels of modified MCM-41". Microporous and Mesoporous Material. 99 (3): 319–327. Bibcode:2007MicMM..99..319A. doi:10.1016/j.micromeso.2006.09.042.
- Easwaramoorthi, S.; Natarajan, P. (2008). "Redox properties of phenosafranine at zeolite-modified electrodes-effect of surface modification and solution pH". Materials Chemistry and Physics. 107 (1): 101–109. doi:10.1016/j.matchemphys.2007.06.057.
- Ananthanarayanan, K.; Natarajan, P. (2009). "Fabrication and photophysical studies of phenosafranine and proflavine dyes encapsulated in mesoporous MCM-41 along with titanium dioxide nanoparticles". Microporous and Mesoporous Materials. 124 (1–3): 179–189. Bibcode:2009MicMM.124..179A. doi:10.1016/j.micromeso.2009.05.028.
- Senthilkumar, Karuppannan; Paul, Parimal; Selvaraju, Chellappan; Natarajan, Paramasivam (2010). "Preparation, characterization, and photophysical study of thiazine dyes within the nanotubes and nanocavities of silicate host: influence of titanium dioxide nanoparticle on the protonation and aggregation of dyes". The Journal of Physical Chemistry C. 114 (15): 7085–7094. doi:10.1021/jp912267q.

== See also ==
- Photochemistry
