= Jil (film) =

- Theatrical release Poster
- Directed by: Radha Krishna Kumar
- Written by: Radha Krishna Kumar
- Produced by: V. Vamsi Krishna Reddy; Pramod Uppalapati
- Starring: Gopichand; Raashii Khanna; Kabir Duhan Singh
- Cinematography: Sakthi Saravanan
- Edited by: Kotagiri Venkateswara Rao
- Music by: Ghibran
- Production company: UV Creations
- Distributed by: Lorgan Entertainment (Australia & New Zealand)
- Release date: 27 March 2015
- Running time: 130 min
- Country: India
- Language: Telugu

Jil (transl. Shivers) is a 2015 Indian Telugu-language action comedy film directed by debutant Radha Krishna Kumar. It was produced by V. Vamsi Krishna Reddy and Pramod Uppalapati under UV Creations, The film stars Gopichand, Raashii Khanna, and Kabir Duhan Singh in lead roles, with the music composed by Ghibran. The film was released on 28 March 2015.

== Plot ==
In Mumbai, A gangster named Chota Nayak escapes from police custody and sets out to look for his aide-turned-foe Ranganath, who turned police informer and stole Nayak's money worth ₹10,000 crore (US$1.1 billion). Jai is a fire department officer in Hyderabad who happens to help Ranganath who soon dies due to the fire accident. Nayak suspects Jai to be an accomplice of Ranganath and reaches Hyderabad to enquire him about Ranganath. Jai meets Savithri and they start dating to know about each other.

Meanwhile, Nayak traces Jai and enquires him to reveal about his conversation with Ranganath, to which Jai objects and warns him not to trouble him again. Nayak threatens to kill whoever is close to Jai and keeps his word when he kills Jai's friend Ajay and Jai's uncle in a fire accident, after which Jai kills Nayak's brother. Jai then sends his family to a safe place, but Savithri, unaware of Nayak's presence, talk to Jai. Nayak then finds out about Savitri and captures her and he threatens to kill her if Jai does not hand over the money. Jai realizes where the money is and rifles through Ranganath's coat, where he finds a book containing the bank account and password where the money is located.

Jai calls Nayak, and they meet at a desolate market for the exchange, but the exchange goes wrong when ACP Parasuram tries to capture Nayak. Nayak escapes, much to Parasuram's dismay. Later, Nayak gains access to the bank account and finds it empty as all the money had been transferred to the injured Savithri's account. Nayak tries reviving Savithri in an abandoned construction site with the help of doctors, who revives her from the injuries and reveals her account number. Jai arrives and sets fire to the building where he sends Savithri in the hospital ambulance and defeats Nayak's henchmen and stops the financial transaction. Jai faces Nayak and brutally kills him, thus avenging Ajay and his uncle's death. After this, Jai goes on a date with Savithri.

== Cast ==
- Gopichand as Jai
- Raashii Khanna as Savitri
- Kabir Duhan Singh as Chota Nayak
- Harish Uthaman as ACP A. Parasuram
- Posani Krishna Murali as Narayana
- Amit Tiwari as Nayak's brother
- Chalapathi Rao as Jai's uncle
- Urvashi as Jai's aunt
- Brahmaji as Ranganath
- Bharath Reddy as Ali
- Supreeth as Ghora
- Srinivas Avasarala as Ajay
- Prabhas Sreenu as Seenu
- Ananth Babu as Doctor
- Raviprakash as Savithri's father
- Eswara Uday Sai Kiran as Patient

== Soundtrack ==
Jil

Film score by Ghibran
- Released: 12 March 2015
- Recorded: 2015
- Genre: Soundtrack
- Length: 19:22
- Label: Junglee Music
- Producer: Ghibran

Ghibran chronology
Amara Kaaviyam (2014)	Jil (2015)	Uttama Villain (2015)

The film's music was composed by Ghibran and released by Junglee Music Company.

No.	Title	Lyrics	Singer(s)	Length
1.	"Man on Fire"	Sri Mani	Yazin Nizar, Bianca Gomes	3:35
2.	"Jil Jil Jil"	Ramajogayya Sastry	Yazin Nizar, Shalmali Kholgade	4:24
3.	"Swing Swing Swing"	Srijo	Blaaze, Sangita Santosham	3:40
4.	"Emaindi Vela"	Krishna kanth	Clinton Cerejo, Sharanya Gopinath, arman hossain	3:40
5.	"Pori Masala Pori"	Ramajogayya Sastry	Nivin Bedford, Sharanya Gopinath, arman hossain	3:38
Total length:				19:22

== Reception ==
Idlebrain rated the movie 3 out of 5 and reviewed that first half of the film is nice compared to the second half. It identified technical standards, production values, and songs as being strong components. The Times of India gave 3 out of 5 stars and wrote "The tone of the film flip-flops from being drab to extremely violent within a matter of few minutes, which never lets you to sink your teeth deep into the story.".
