= Sangita Santosham =

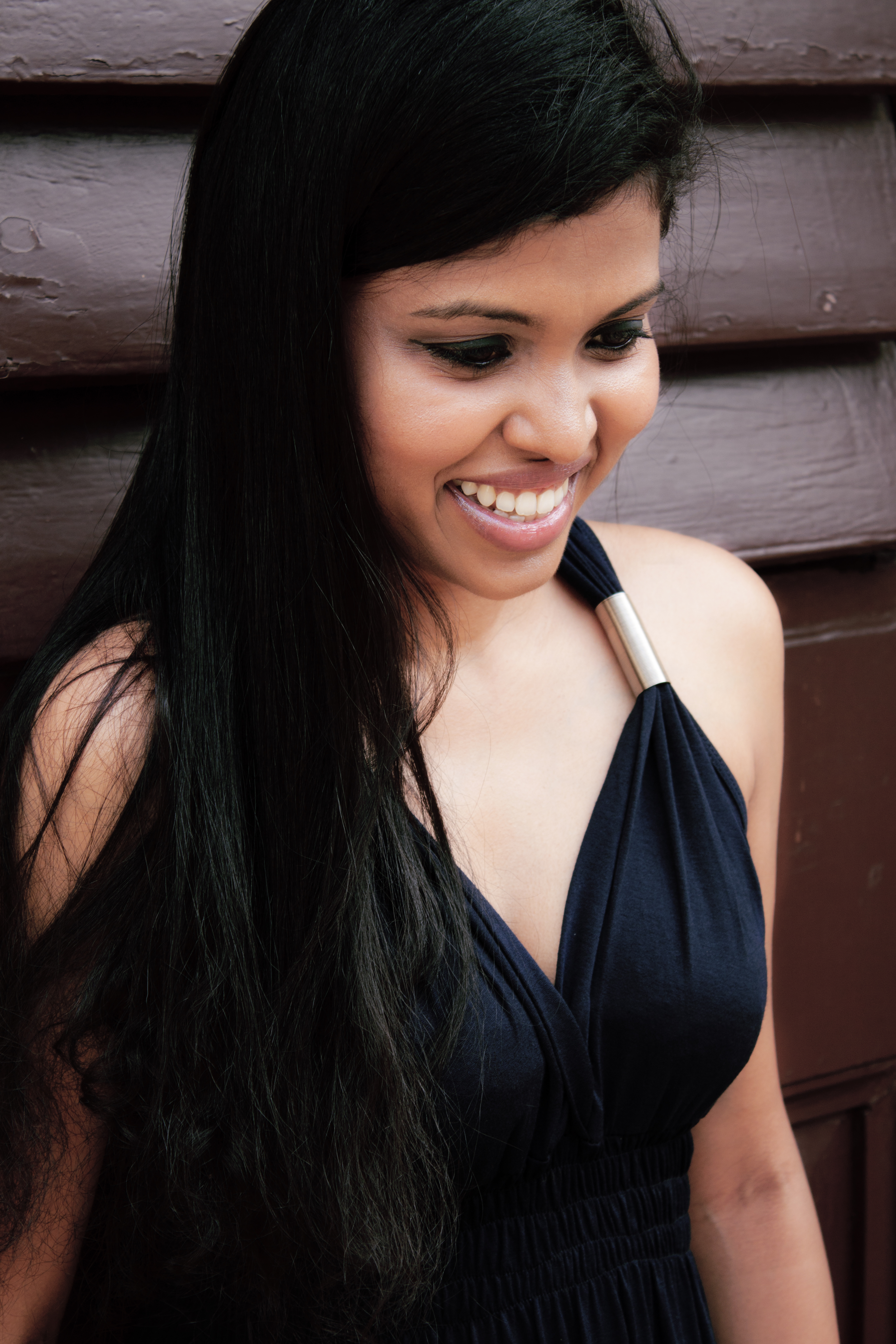

Background information
- Born: Palayamkottai, Tirunelveli, Tamil Nadu, India
- Origin: Madras, Tamil Nadu, India
- Genres: Western classical music, musical theatre, jazz, gospel
- Occupations: Performing artist, stage actress, vocalist, musician
- Member of: Harmonize Projekt
- Website: Sangita Santosham's channel on YouTube

Sangita Santosham is an established performing artist based out of Chennai, India. She is a versatile and multilingual vocalist credited with singing a wide range of genres right from western classical music, contemporary jazz to Tamil hits. She is one of the very few artists from India formally trained in musical theatre as well.

== Biography ==
Sangita hails from a family of renowned medical specialists. She was born in Palayamkottai, Tirunelveli, to Julia Santosham and Dr. Ravi Santosham, and currently resides in Chennai. She is the granddaughter of Dr. Mathuram Santosham, former Member of Parliament and founder of the Santoshapuram Tuberculosis Sanatorium and also the Lung Clinic, which is currently run as the Santosham Chest Hospital by her father and uncles Dr. Rajan Santosham and Dr. Roy Santosham. Sangita has also trained in the areas of psychology and the behavioural sciences.

== Musical background ==
Sangita's family has deeply rooted musical inclinations, the most notable members being her late grandfather who was the second Indian president of the prestigious (MMA) and her father Dr. Ravi Santosham who has been serving as its president since 1990 and is also a member of the famous GATT Quintet and the Male Voice Ensemble. Sangita trained with Neecia Majolly, in musical theatre, western classical singing and music theory and was awarded the Majolly Rolling Trophy in 2009 for the best singer in Music Theatre. She also spent a year training in western classical singing at the Wanda L. Bass School of Music in Oklahoma City. She is an Associate of the London College of Music London College of Music.

== Performance ==
Sangita is noted for her versatility, ease in handling the different musical genres and commanding stage presence. Her live rendition of Sweeney Todd's "Worst Pies in London", and Georges Bizet's "Habanera", as part of the MMA's "Over The Rainbow", is Sangita at her entertaining best. She has been a part of the Madras Musical Association choir since the age of 15. She has given several solo performances at events staged by the MMA both in India and other countries. In 2009, she performed at the Vatican and the Pantheon in Rome, Italy as part of the International Church Music Festival. She has sung under world famous conductors such as Sir David Willcocks and Paul Leddignton Wright. In 2000, while still in school, she performed at the Sydney Torch Relay ceremony as part of the Sydney Olympics under Dr. Ronald Smart. She has sung for several international gospel artists on tour, the most renowned being Ron Kenoly, Don Moen, Ernie Haase & Signature Sound and Benny Prasad.

Sangita is an active participant in musical theater. She has been invited to perform with various theater groups, and is noted for her outstanding rendition of Andrew Lloyd Webber's "Don't Cry for Me Argentina" during Mellow Circle's "Magic of Musicals" show. Her 2014 performance in Amrita Frederik and Augustine Paul's adaption of Les Misérables, garnered her handsome praise for her "perfect" portrayal of the courageous Eponine. Her laurels include her pitch perfect and "convincing" performance as Sister Mary Robert in theatrical adaptation of Sister Act in 2015. Her theatrical performances include those with well-known directors Michael Muthu, the late Mithran Devanesan, Brian Laul of the Wizard of Oz fame and also choreographer Jeffrey Vardon.

Sangita's musical repertoire includes her on-stage performances with other established singers. She has performed alongside popular artists such as Pop Shalini in Brian Laul's Wizard of Oz and Sunitha Sarathy. Her performances include duets with Grammy award winner Tanvi Shah and actress-singer Andrea Jeremiah. She has performed with Kalyani Nair, an accredited singer and composer, and also as part of her band, Harmonize Projekt.

Sangita has also worked with other renowned Indian musicians such as Keith Peters, Dr. L. Subramaniam, Keba Jeremiah and Edwin Roy.

Her recordings and videos have been commented on and retweeted by popular artists Ehsaan Noorani and Keba Jeremiah. She performs in English, French, German, Italian, Spanish, Tamil, Malayalam, Telugu languages.
