= Oka Laila Kosam =

2014 Indian Telugu-language film

- Theatrical release poster
- Directed by: Vijay Kumar Konda
- Written by: Vijay Kumar Konda
- Produced by: Nagarjuna
- Starring: Naga Chaitanya; Pooja Hegde
- Cinematography: I. Andrew
- Edited by: Prawin Pudi
- Music by: Anup Rubens
- Production company: Annapurna Studios
- Release date: 17 October 2014
- Running time: 150 minutes
- Country: India
- Language: Telugu
- Budget: ₹20 crore (US$2.1 million)
- Box office: ₹40 crore (US$4.2 million)

Oka Laila Kosam (transl. For one girl) is a 2014 Indian Telugu-language romantic comedy film written and directed by Vijay Kumar Konda. Produced by Nagarjuna on his home banner Annapurna Studios, the film features Naga Chaitanya and Pooja Hegde. Anoop Rubens composed the music for this film while I. Andrew and Praveen Pudi handled the cinematography and editing departments respectively. This film marked the Telugu debut of Pooja Hegde.

Oka Laila Kosam was released worldwide on 17 October 2014 to positive reviews from critics. Despite the collections being affected due to Cyclone Hudhud, the film was a commercial success at the box office.

== Plot ==
Karthik is a rich post graduate from ISB who completes his studies. He rejects his job offer and requests his father for a one-year break. He returns to India after a world tour. One day, he spots Nandana and falls head over heels for her. However Nandana develops hatred for Karthik. When Karthik proposes to her, she rejects him point blank, thinking that he is a play boy as she previously misunderstood him. Karthik's marriage was arranged with Nandana but unfortunately, he does not know this. The bride accidentally turns out to be Nandana. Karthik's maternal uncle Pandu returns from Dubai and because of his hatred towards Karthik, he plans to take revenge by jeopardizing his match when he finds out that Karthik actually loves Nandana, but Karthik finds out the truth and accepts to marry her. She is not interested in this marriage but she does not want to oppose her father due to her love for him. When she tries to reject the marriage, both their parents complete the procedures and they are pronounced engaged.

Karthik has been writing a book titled Oka Laila Kosam which is a collection of his experiences with Nandana. Meanwhile, Karthik meets his friend at a pub and learns that she is being blackmailed by a goon regarding their private moments. Karthik fights the goons with his friends and solves the issues. Nandana is unable to get convinced that Karthik's love is sincere and believes that he is a flirt. The book Oka Laila Kosam gets published and Karthik is paid an amount of ₹25,000. As a part of his attempts to impress her, Karthik gets a star named as Nandana by acquiring a star certificate from International Star Registry with the money he earned. Though initially happy, she still is unable to believe him and tears the certificate into pieces. But she is unable to reject Karthik as she can't let her father disappointed by doing so. That night Karthik was drunken and was brutally attacked by a goon.

On the day of marriage, at the venue, the police arrest Karthik for murdering the goon. Thus the marriage is halted much to the delight of Nandana. Before leaving, Karthik asks her whether she is happy now and leaves with a smile. This puzzles Nandana and it is known later that the case and arrest were fake and were planned by Karthik himself with the help of a rich businessman whose daughter's successful love affair had Karthik as the peace maker. Nandana meanwhile receives the book Oka Laila Kosam from Shahrukh who credits its writer as the owner of the pigeons she has. She reads the book which is her story and learns Karthik's sincerity from the words in the book. She meets Karthik and proposes to him before their respective families and they both unite.

== Cast ==
- Naga Chaitanya as Karthik, Nandhu’s love interest
- Pooja Hegde as Nandana "Nandhu", Karthik's love interest (voice dubbed by Chinmayi)
- Suman as Chandrakanth, Karthik's father
- Sudha as Karthik's mother
- Raghu Babu as Dr. Bharadwaj, Kakarla Ram Prasad’s henchman
- Sayaji Shinde as Nandana's father
- Ali as Panduranga Rao “Pandu”, Karthik's maternal uncle
- Madhunandan as Praveen
- Rao Ramesh As Krishna Rao, Nandhu’s uncle
- Bharath Reddy as Karthik's brother-in-law
- Madhusudhan Rao as Inspector
- Posani Krishna Murali as Sub-Inspector
- Vennela Kishore as Book Publisher
- Srinivasa Reddy as Kiran
- Satyam Rajesh as Ravi, Karthik's friend
- Amit Tiwari as Jojo

== Production ==
=== Development ===
Vijay Kumar Konda was inspired by an incident that happened in Warangal a few years ago which was an acid attack on a girl named Swapnika by a cruel boy and developed a story where a boy persuades a girl to love him in a good way. He met Nagarjuna on the sets of Manam and narrated it to him and Naga Chaitanya. The project was announced officially in late July 2013 stating that the film would be produced by Nagarjuna himself on his home banner Annapoorna Studios. In early December 2013, the film was said to be titled as Oka Laila Kosam, which was the title of a song from Naga Chaitanya's grandfather Akkineni Nageswara Rao's Ramudu Kaadu Krishnudu. The film was formally launched at Annapurna Studios in Hyderabad on 12 December 2013. The film's cast and crew were declared at the event. The music was composed by Anoop Rubens. Cinematography was handled by I Andrews while editing was done by Praveen Pudi. Art director was P. S. Varma, fights were composed by Vijay and costumes were designed by Neeraja Kona. In a statement to the IANS, Vijay Kumar said that the film would have a healthy humor suitable for family viewing as he felt that not everybody were comfortable with the homosexual jokes in his debut film.

=== Casting ===
In early October 2013, 2010 Miss Universe runner up Pooja Hegde was selected to play the heroine in the film marking her Telugu debut. Former anchor turned actor Shyamala was selected to play Naga Chaitanya's sister in the film which was supposed to be her debut as an actress though Loukyam released earlier. About his character in the film, Naga Chaitanya said that he is called Karthik, a 24-25-year-old guy who is not interested in marriage. Elaborating further, he said "He is a fun loving, light-hearted character, very giving and is willing to do anything for the people he loves – friends or family. He believes in love at first sight and is always on a journey to discover new things." Ali was selected to play the character of Naga Chaitanya's uncle in the film which was said to be a hilarious role.

=== Filming ===
The principal photography commenced on 12 December 2013 in Hyderabad and the first schedule was wrapped up nearly on 26 December 2013. The second schedule began in January 2014 and some crucial scenes were shot in that schedule at Hyderabad. The second schedule was wrapped up on 11 January 2014. After a gap due to Akkineni Nageswara Rao's death, Naga Chaitanya joined the film's shoot in February 2014. In mid-February 2014, it was reported that the film is in its third and last major schedule and majority of the talkie part was said to be wrapped up with patchwork and songs remained to be shot. The shooting continued at Annapurna Studios where some crucial scenes on the lead were shot. At the same time, it was announced that the talkie part of the film would be wrapped up by April 2014 and after shooting the songs in abroad, the film's shoot will be wrapped up thus making it a summer release.

On 18 March, Vijay declared that 60% of the film's shoot has been wrapped. In the end of March, a fight sequence was shot on Naga Chaitanya which was choreographed by Ram-Lakshman. The shoot then continued in locales of Hyderabad in mid-April 2014 where scenes on principal cast were shot. It was expected then that the principal photography would end in span of a month. On 20 May 2014 Pooja Hegde informed via Twitter that the film's talkie part has been wrapped up and only the songs are left to be shot. In the first week of June, it was reported that 3 songs will be shot at Switzerland from 12 to 25 June 2014. Because of the songs shoot, Chaitanya could not attend the promotional activities of Autonagar Surya prior to the film's release. The filming continued in the second week of July 2014 at Interlaken at Switzerland where a song was shot on the lead pair. Part of the song's shoot included the lead pair paragliding. On 2 August, it was announced that the film's shoot is in the final stages. A week later, the film entered post production phase.

== Music ==
Anoop Rubens composed the film's soundtrack and the background score marking his second collaboration with Vijay Kumar Konda. In the second week of August 2014, Vijay revealed that the soundtrack would feature a remixed version of the song Oka Laila Kosam from the film Ramudu Kaadu Krishnudu after which this film is titled. It was reported in mid-August 2014 that the film's soundtrack is scheduled for a release on 15 August 2014 with one of the songs being launched at Hyderabad and two songs being launched at PVP Square Mall in Vijayawada. The film's soundtrack was purchased and marketed by Aditya Music. The platinum disc function was held on 20 September 2014, at the Shilpakala Vedika in Hyderabad, which coincides with the 100th day celebrations of Manam.

== Release ==
In mid-February 2014, the makers planned for a summer 2014 release. On 2 August 2014 the makers said that they are planning to release the film on 5 September 2014. The film's overseas theatrical screening & distribution rights were acquired by Blue Sky Cinemas. The release date was moved to 29 August 2014 because the post production earlier than expected. Nagarjuna later postponed the film indefinitely because of other major releases happening at that time.

The film's release date was postponed to October end or early November 2014. The release date was finalized as 17 October 2014. There were no changes in the plan in view of the Uttarandhra districts being affected by Cyclone Hudhud. Naga Chaitanya said "I feel sad on seeing the pictures and hearing the news. Once normalcy is restored, we plan to re-release the film in those districts. For now only a few theaters in the affected regions will screen the film."

=== Marketing ===
On 2 August 2014 the first look poster was launched which featured the lead pair. The film's trailer was released on 12 August 2014. The trailer registered positive response from the viewers and received 0.1 million views in YouTube in one day of its release. Naga Chaitanya, Pooja Hegde, Vijay Kumar Konda and Anoop Rubens did a flash mob and entertained the huge crowd who attended the launch of two songs of the soundtrack at PVP Mall in Vijayawada on 17 August 2014 as a part of the film's promotion. However, the event ended on an ugly note as people were seen pushing each other while hooting and cheering for Chaitanya who tried to get closer to him and the situation soon got out of hand as a mini stampede ensued in the mall. The incident forced the police to resort to lathi charge to bring the crowd under control.

Naga Chaitanya and Pooja Hegde promoted the film on the inaugural episode of the talk show Ali Talkies hosted by comedian Ali on 11 October 2014. As part of the promotional campaign, an event named Vandha Lailala Kosam Naga Chaitanya (Naga Chaitanya for 100 Lailas) was held at Annapurna 7 acres Studios on 13 October 2014. 100 girls and 100 boys all over the state have attended this event for whom special trailers of the film were screened. Anoop Rubens gave a live performance. Pooja Hegde's birthday celebrations were also held on the same stage.

=== Home media ===
The film had its television premiere on 23 November 2014 on MAA TV. The film received a TRP rating of 13.16, one of the largest recorded for a film broadcast.

== Reception ==
=== Critical response ===
Upon release the film got what the IB Times called "decent" reviews with the critics mostly praising the lead actors performances and the gripping screenplay. Ranjani Rajendra of The Hindu called it a "regular feel good fare" and wrote "Though there's nothing phenomenal in terms of storyline, Oka Laila Kosam makes for a good one-time watch with its fair share of laughs and entertainment." Hemanth Kumar of The Times of India wrote "Oka Laila Kosam is a simple love story which doesn't quite leave you with a big smile on your face, but it has enough mojo, if you are a big sucker for romance. After all, there's nothing more comforting than a happy ending in a romantic film" and rated it 3 out of 5. Suresh Kavirayani of Deccan Chronicle wrote "The director has concentrated more on the lead actor and has left the female lead in confusion and there is no clarity about her character. But overall it's a feel good film and you can watch it once for Chaitanya and Pooja Hegde" and rated it 3 out of 5. Veena of Oneindia Entertainment wrote "Vijay Kumar Konda's story and screenplay should really be appreciated for portraying the casual story magically, onscreen. Oka Laila Kosam is a good romantic entertainer. The movie includes all commercial elements and will be a hit movie in Naga Chaitanya's career again" and rated it 3 out of 5.

IndiaGlitz wrote "Barring a few well-crafted scenes and nice visuals, the film lacks a strong story to keep the story going. Once watchable for the taking" and rated it 2.75 out of 5. IANS wrote "At a running time of 150 minutes, you really wish you had the power to stop the film whenever you want. Alas, that option is out of the question .Oka Laila Kosam, which is partly refreshing, is messed up mostly as it suffers from clichéd storytelling." Rajitha S. of The New Indian Express wrote "The film starts on a boring note, but it gets racy until the end of first half. The second half has too many elements which makes it clear that director Vijay Kumar Konda wanted to attribute too many characteristics to Naga Chaitanya. Chaitanya though has done justice to the role, as a character Karthik is slightly overdone".

=== Box office ===
Oka Laila Kosam opened to low occupancy in both single screens and multiplexes. The film collected ₹5 million (US$52,000) on its first day at the global box office. The film collected ₹6 million (US$62,000) in AP/Nizam region and ₹2 million (US$21,000) nett in the rest of the world by the end of three days taking its global first weekend total to ₹85 million (US$880,000) thus recovering 5% of the film's budget. The film netted approximately ₹10 million (US$100,000) in its first week globally. Despite the collections being affected due to Cyclone Hudhud, the film was a commercial success at the box office.

== Accolades ==
Year	Award	Category	Nominee	Result	Ref.
2015	South Indian International Movie Awards	Best Female Debut – Telugu	Pooja Hegde	Nominated	
2015	Filmfare Awards South	Best Actress – Telugu	Pooja Hegde	Nominated	
2015	Santosham Film Awards	Best Debut Heroine	Pooja Hegde	Won	
2015	CineMAA Awards	Best Female Debut	Pooja Hegde	Nominated	
