= K R Balakrishnan =

Indian cardiothoracic and transplant surgeon

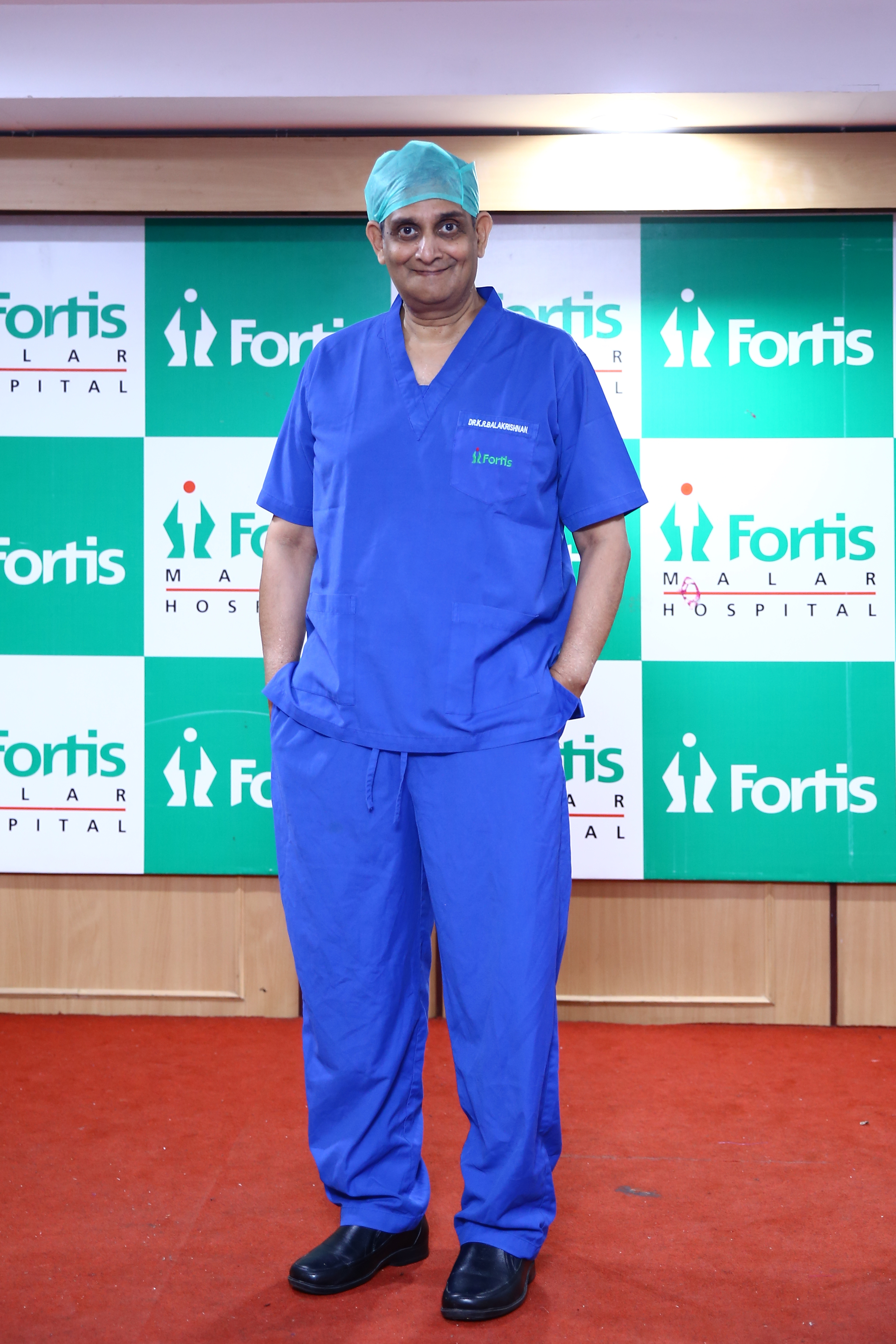
- K R Balakrishnan in 2016
- Education: MBBS, M.S., M.Ch.
- Medical career
- Profession: Cardiothoracic & transplant surgeon

K R Balakrishnan is an Indian cardiothoracic and heart transplant surgeon. He is the member of Indian Medical Association.

K R Balakrishnan earned MBBS degree from JIPMER, Pondicherry in 1976. He completed MS in General Surgery from AIIMS, New Delhi in 1980. Balakrishnan also qualified M.Ch. in Cardio Thoracic Surgery from KEM Hospital, Mumbai, in 1982.

Balakrishnan was the Professor and Head of Cardio Thoracic and Vascular Surgery at Sri Ramachandra Medical College and Research Institute, Chennai from 1994 to 2008.

Balakrishnan was the director of cardiac sciences at Fortis Malar Hospital Chennai till October 2019. Balakrishnan performed the first LVAD and HVAD pump transplant in India in 2012 and 2013 respectively.
