= Jawaharlal Institute of Postgraduate Medical Education and Research =

Public medical school in Pondicherry, India

- जवाहरलाल स्नातकोत्तर चिकित्सा शिक्षा एवं अनुसंधान संस्थान
- Official Emblem of JIPMER, Pondicherry
- Other names: JIPMER; Institut Jawaharlal d'Enseignement et de Recherche Médicaux Postuniversitaires
- Former name: École de Médecine de Pondichéry
- Motto: Latin: Veritas Curat; Sanskrit: सत्यं महाभेषजम्
- Motto in English: "The Truth Cures"
- Type: Autonomous Public Medical Research University
- Established: 1 January 1823; 203 years ago
- Founder: Napoléon Joseph Louis Bontemps
- Parent institution: Ministry of Health and Family Welfare, Government of India
- Accreditation: MoHFW; NABL; NMC; DCI; INC
- Affiliations: WHO; NMC; INC; ICMR; NBE; DCI
- Academic affiliations: INI
- Endowment: ₹1,496.46 crore (US$160 million) (For FY2026–27 est.)
- President: Dr. Chitra Sarkar
- Director: Dr. Vir Singh Negi
- Academic staff: 431 (2026)
- Students: 2,892
- Undergraduates: 1,892
- Postgraduates: 1,000
- Doctoral students: 49
- Location: Pondicherry, Puducherry, India; 11°57′17″N 79°47′54″E
- Campus: 195 acres (79 ha); Urban
- Website: www.jipmer.edu.in
- Government of India (MoHFW)

Organisation
- Type: Teaching hospital

Services
- Standards: NMC
- Emergency department: Level I Trauma Center
- Beds: 2,248

Helipads
- Helipad: No

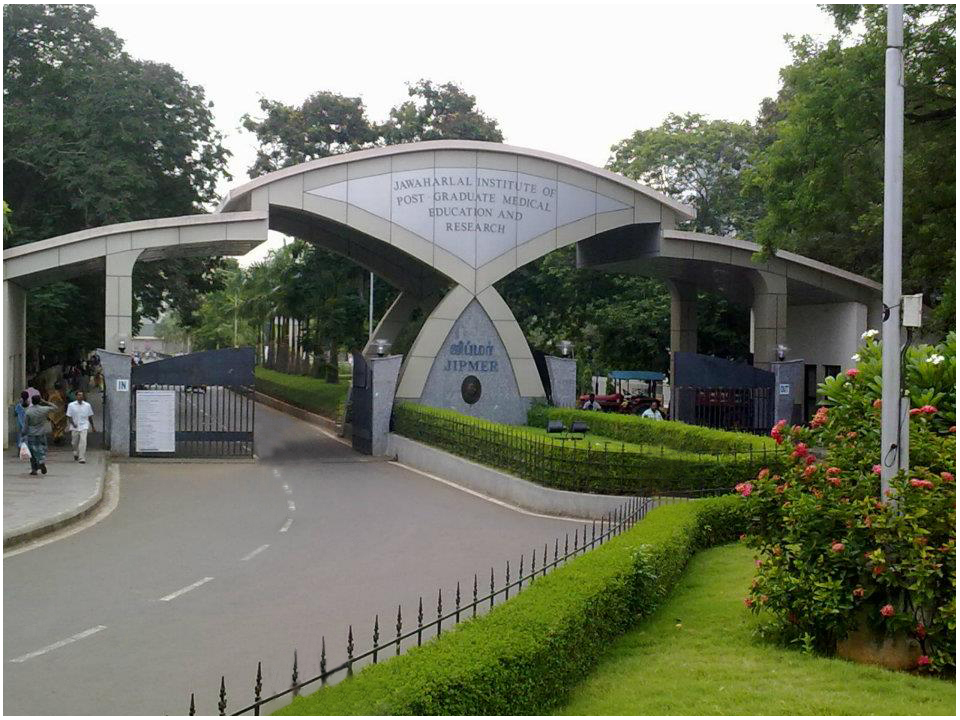
Jawaharlal Institute of Postgraduate Medical Education and Research

The Jawaharlal Institute of Postgraduate Medical Education and Research (JIPMER) is a medical school located in Pondicherry, India. JIPMER is an Institute of National Importance (INI) and a tertiary care referral hospital. It is under the direct administrative control of the Ministry of Health and Family Welfare, and Government of India, with autonomy to run its internal administration.

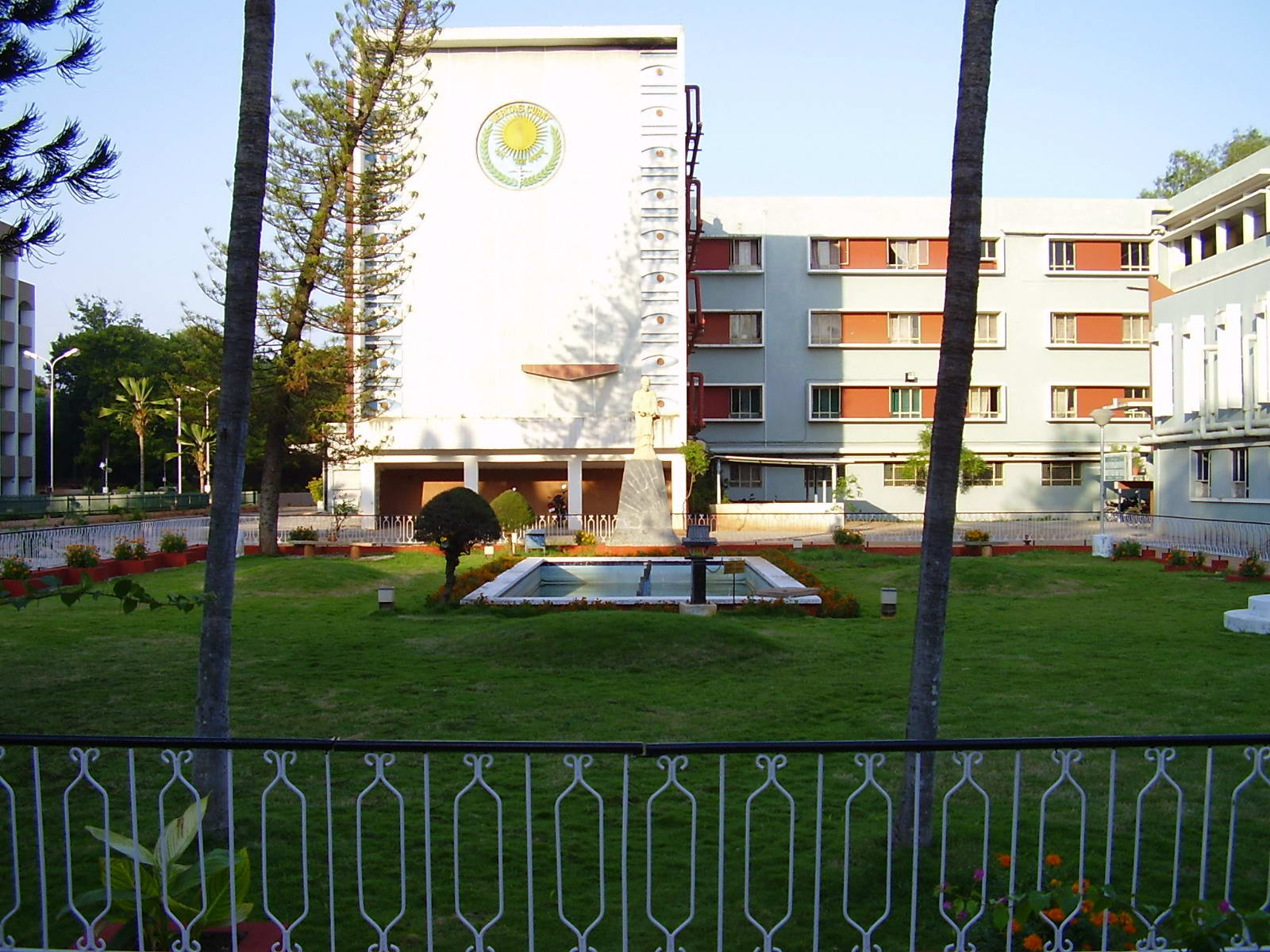
Lecture halls building

JIPMER currently has over 300 faculty members, over 700 resident physicians and over 800 nursing, administrative, and support staff. It admits 249 undergraduate students and 200 postgraduate students annually.

== History ==
The erstwhile French India established the École de Médecine de Pondichéry to train French citizens in Pondichéry in 1823. It was one of the earliest institutions of tropical medicine.

Following the de jure transfer of Puducherry to India in 1956, the Government of India took over the college and renamed it as Medical College, Pondicherry. For a short period, this was also called the Dhanvantri Medical College.

The foundation stone for a new medical college building was laid at Gorimedu in 1959, on the outskirts of the town by SE Le Comte Stanislas Ostrorog, Ambassadeur de France aux Indes.

In 1964, the institution was given its current name in honour of India's first Prime Minister Pandit Jawaharlal Nehru, as "Jawaharlal Institute of Postgraduate Medical Education and Research" (JIPMER), on 13 July 1964, by Dr Sarvepalli Radhakrishnan, the then President of India.

In 2008, JIPMER was upgraded as an Institution of National Importance by an act of Indian Parliament.

== Campus ==
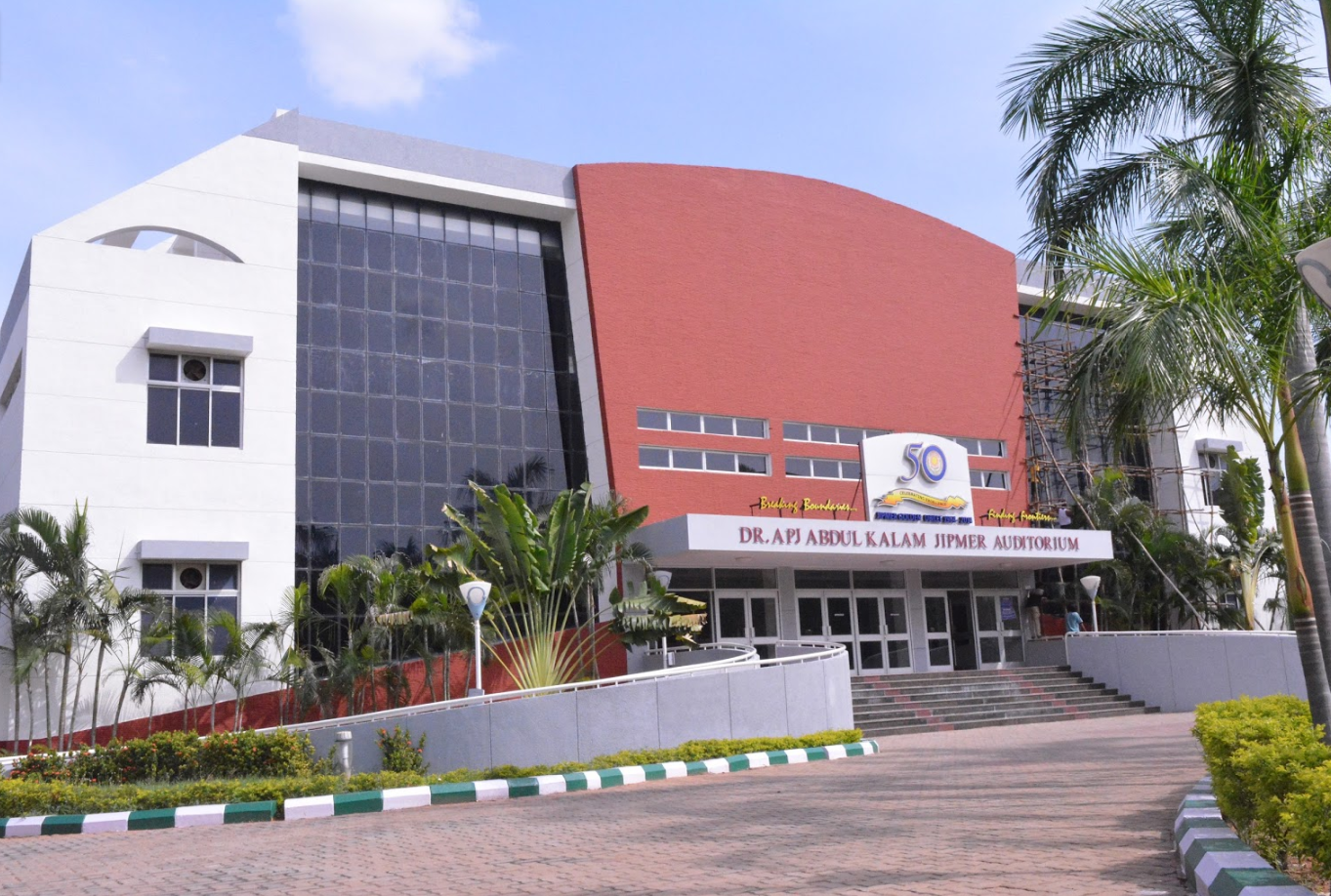
Dr. APJ Abdul Kalam JIPMER Auditorium. Seminars and Conferences are conducted here.

The campus of JIPMER lies at the western entrance of Pondicherry and spreads across 195 acres (0.79 km^{2}) of a hillock known locally as Gorimedu.

The campus contains the medical college, the old and new hospital blocks, student and resident hostels, staff quarters, a Kendriya Vidyalaya, a branch each of two nationalized banks, two ATM's, a post office, a temple, the Dr. APJ Abdul Kalam JIPMER Auditorium, playgrounds and sporting fields.

== Organization and administration ==
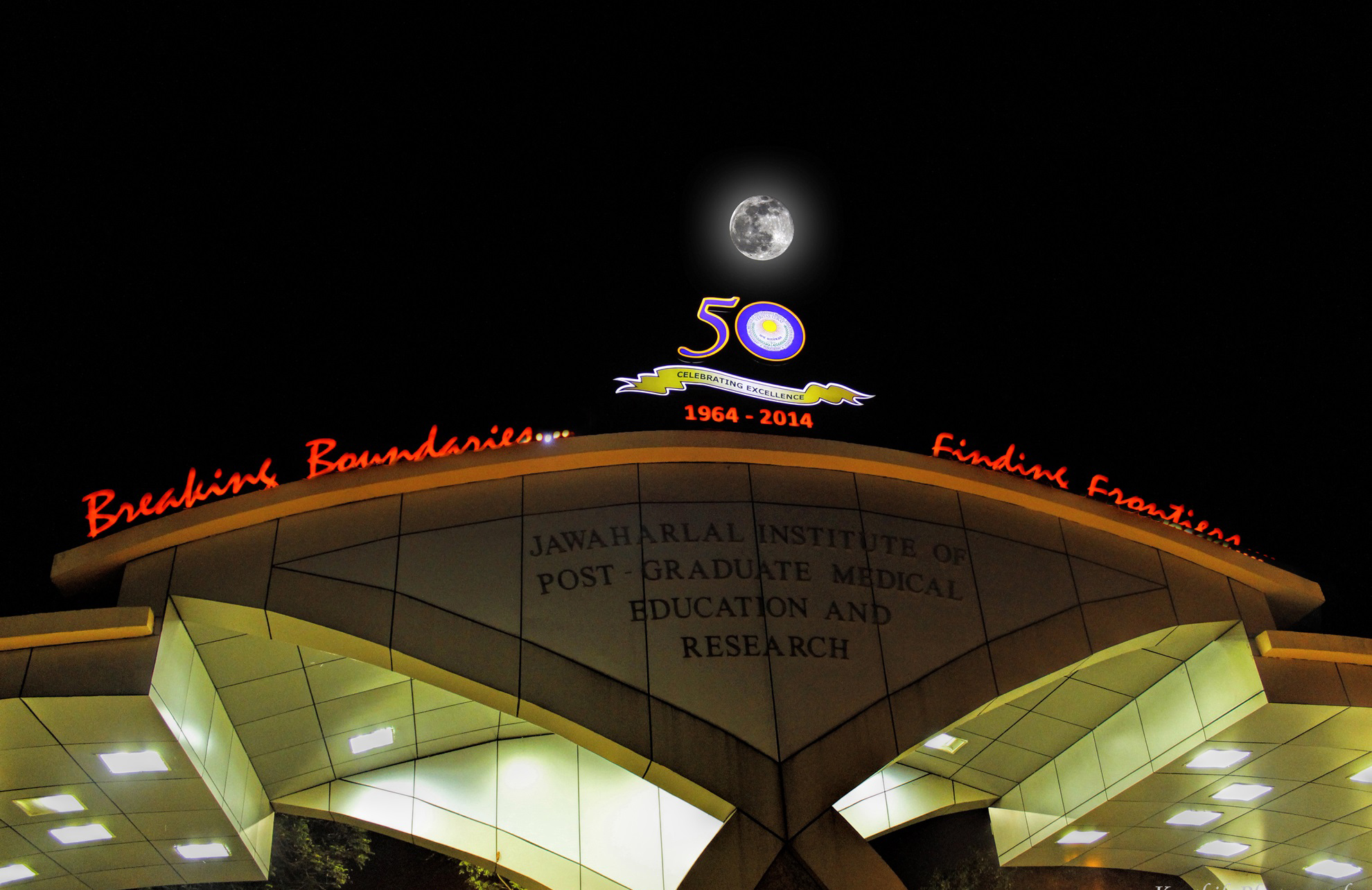
The entrance of JIPMER

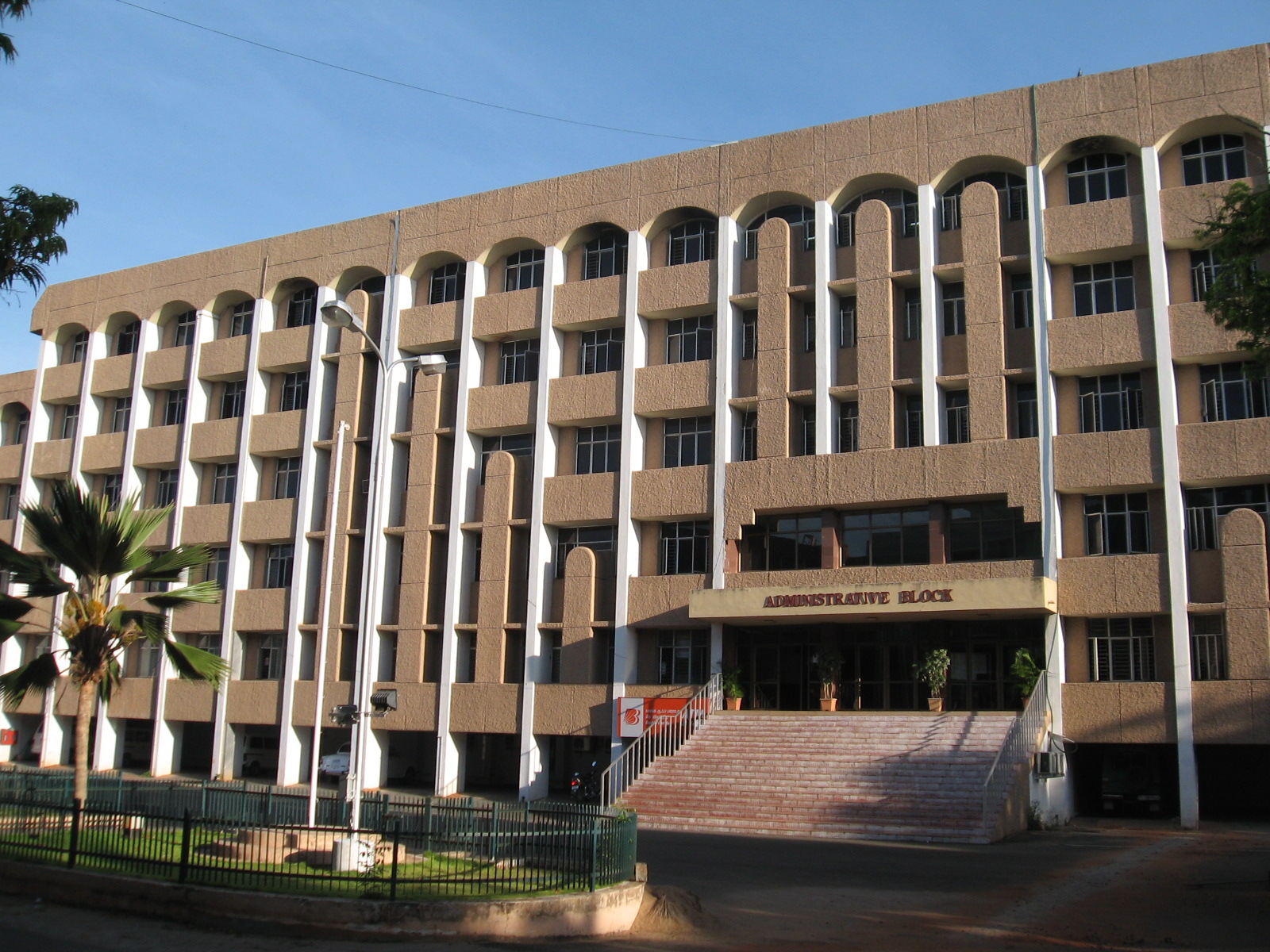
Administrative block

The institute is headed by the Director, who is the chief executive charged with the overall responsibility of running the institute and its hospital. The Medical Superintendent helps the Director coordinate all the hospital functions pertaining to patient care. Dean (Academic) is charged with overseeing and coordinating all the academic activities of the institute including teaching, whereas Dean (Research) looks after all the research-related activities.

=== Principals of Dhanvantri Medical College/JIPMER, Pondicherry ===
- Leon Lapeyssonie—first Principal
- S Vengsarkar
- D Jagannath Reddy
- Bala Subramanian
- DB Bisht

=== Directors of JIPMER ===
- MN Ghosh—first Director
- OP Bhargava
- P Bahadur
- S Chandrasekar
- DS Dubey
- KB Logani
- PH Ananthanarayanan (first JIPMER alumnus to become director of the institute)
- KSVK Subba Rao
- TS Ravikumar
- Subhash Chandra Parija
- Vishnu Bhatt
- Vivekanandam
- RP Swaminathan
- Rakesh Aggarwal
- Gautam Roy
- Vir Singh Negi

== Regional Cancer Centre ==
The Department of Radiotherapy at JIPMER was converted to a Regional Cancer Centre in 2002. As of 2014, the Regional Cancer Centre has two departments housed in a new building, namely Radiotherapy and Medical Oncology. Advanced radiation treatment facilities, ranging from 3D conformal radiation and IMRT to Image-guided Radiation Therapy (IGRT) are available. Basic radiation facilities, such as 2D Cobalt and LINAC, HDR brachytherapy are available free to all cancer patients. Further, most of the commonly used high-cost chemotherapy drugs are also supplied free. Recently, Bone Marrow Transplantation is also being practised in this centre. RCC, JIPMER is the only hospital in southern India to provide free cancer treatment, as is also done for other advanced medical services, such as pulmonary medicine, nephrology, gastroenterology etc.

== Academics ==
Since its designation as an Institute of National Importance, JIPMER is a university by itself, and awards its own degrees. Prior to that, it was affiliated to Pondicherry University. JIPMER offers a number of medical, nursing and paramedical courses at the undergraduate and postgraduate levels. Admissions to all the courses are based on merit.

The institute conducts research in modern medicine, public health and medical education. A research council at the institute level oversees the research activities and a scientific society provides a forum for presenting research work. Numerous conferences, workshops, seminars and training courses are conducted by the institute every year. Funds for research come from intramural and extramural sources such as the ICMR, UGC, DBT, WHO, etc. The institute's faculty, residents and students regularly publish research papers in journals of national and international repute and research abstracts at national and international conferences.

=== Admission ===
Candidates to the courses offered at JIPMER are selected based on All-India level entrance tests NEET, INI-CET and INI-SS. Entrance examinations are held once a year for undergraduate seats and twice a year for post-graduate seats. Calls for applications and results of these examinations (including the names of selected candidates) are announced in major national newspapers as well as on the institute's website.

==== MBBS course ====
JIPMER currently admits 249 students to the MBBS course once every year through an all-India entrance examination. Some seats are reserved for Puducherry natives and Central Government nominations. Of these seats, 187 are for the Puducherry campus and 62 are for its Karaikal campus, which started in 2016.

==== Postgraduate courses ====
Three-year postgraduate courses offered at JIPMER include MD in Internal medicine, Emergency medicine, Nuclear medicine, Radiation oncology, Obstetrics & Gynaecology, Pathology, Forensic medicine, Microbiology, Physiology, Pharmacology, Paediatrics, Anaesthesiology, Dermatology, Biochemistry, Community Medicine, TB & RD and Psychiatry and MS in General Surgery, Neurosurgery, Orthopaedic surgery, Obstetrics and gynaecology, Ophthalmology, Oto-Rhino-Laryngology and Anatomy. The entrance examination i.e., INI-CET has been launched since year 2020 conducted twice a year for postgraduate courses in may and in November.

Super Specialty Courses

Three year super-specialty courses are offered in Medical (DM) and Surgical (MCh) specialties. They include Cardiology, Cardio-Thoracic Surgery, Neurology, Neuro Surgery, Nephrology, Urology, Medical and Surgical Gastroenterology, Medical Oncology, Surgical Oncology, Neonatology, Clinical Pharmacology, Clinical Immunology and Endocrinology.

PhD

PhD candidates are admitted to many departments like Public Health, Pharmacology, Biochemistry, Immunology, Microbiology etc. Admissions are based on an entrance examination conducted once every year.

==== Other courses ====
B.Sc. Nursing.
Four years professional course. Admissions are based on entrance exams.

BSc (Medical Lab Technology) and BSc (Allied Medical Sciences - Cardiac Lab, Anesthesia, OT, Dialysis and Neuro-Technology courses) 3 year. Admissions are based on entrance exams.

MSc (Medical Biochemistry and Medical Physiology). Admissions are based on entrance exams.

=== Rankings ===
University rankings

Medical – India
- India Today (2022): 2
- Government colleges
- Outlook India (2022): 3

JIPMER is ranked second among medical universities in India in 2023 by The Week and was ranked third among government medical colleges in India in 2022 by Outlook India. In the National Institutional Ranking Framework (NIRF) 2025, JIPMER was ranked 4th among medical colleges in India.

=== Ongoing developments ===
JIPMER has started the work of its second super-specialty block (SSB-II), JIPMER International School of Public-health. The institute is partnering with other institutions, including Harvard School of Public Health, to exchange faculty, educational tools, research and data on public health. JIPMER's partnership with the Harvard School of Public Health is part of the larger MoU between the American Medical School and Indian Ministry of Health and Family Welfare. JIPMER has also started the works of offsite hospital in Karaikal.

=== Telemedicine ===
The Telemedicine Services Centre of JIPMER started collaboration with Seoul National University Bundang Hospital (SNUBH), South Korea and has started using Trans-Eurasia Information Network (TEIN). Since, JIPMER is a Member of TEIN Network, the hospital can interact and share knowledge with European and Asian Countries. On 15 February 2016 the personnel of JIPMER interacted over Video Conferencing using TEIN Network with Seoul National University Bundang Hospital (SNUBH) South Korea. JIPMER thus became the first centre to use the Telemedicine services for the purpose. The Trans-Eurasia Information Network (TEIN) uses the ICT technologies to increase regional cooperation with Asian countries and to bridge the digital divide among less developed regions. It connects universities and research institutions with high capacity Internet network to increase the exchanges of knowledge among them and realize international research projects.

== Student life ==
=== Student's union ===
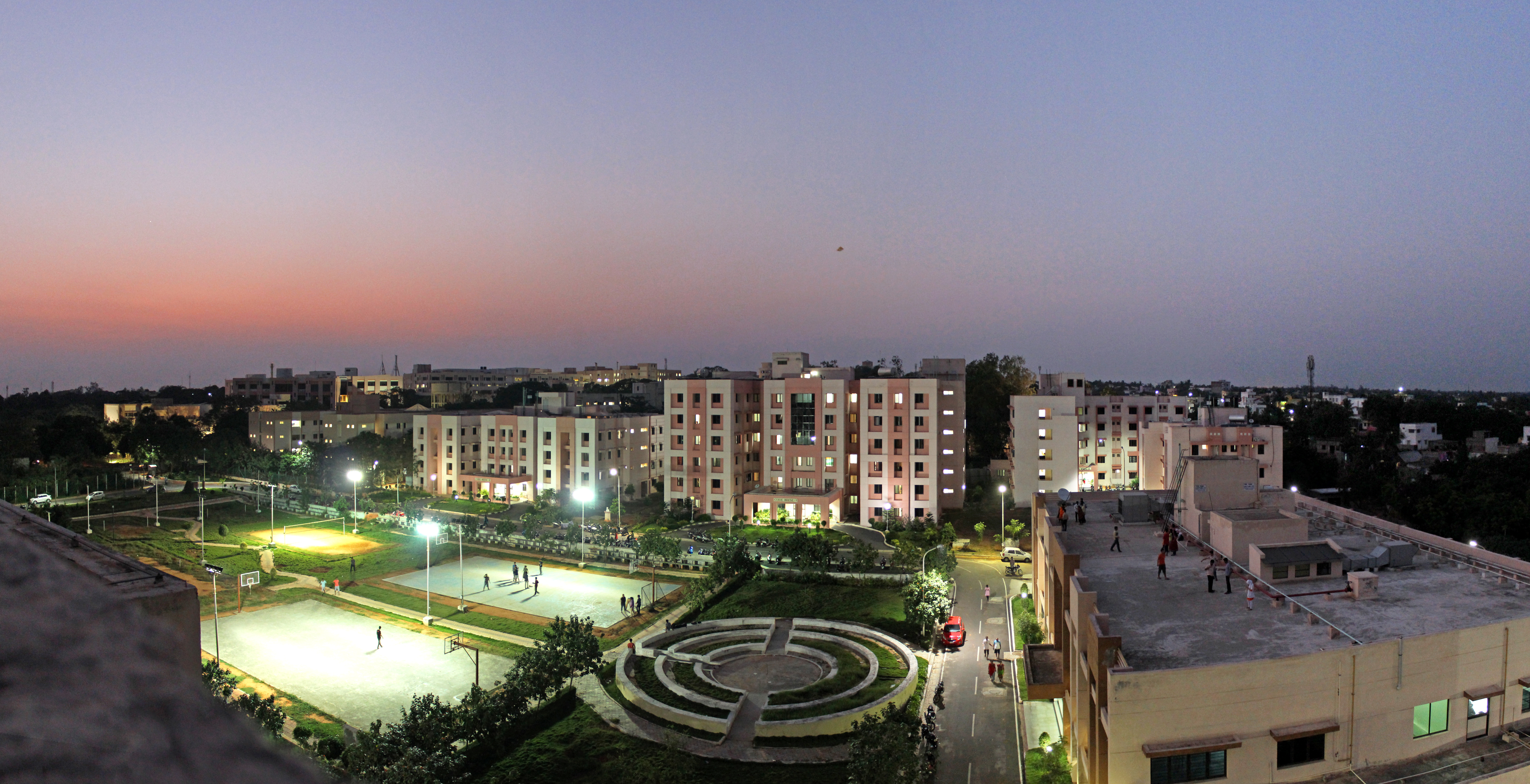
A view of New resident doctor hostel complex

The students union is the "JIPMER Students Association" (JSA). Representatives of the student body are elected annually in a campus-wide election. A similar, albeit smaller, body exists for the postgraduate students and residents and is called the JIPMER Resident Doctors' Association (JRDA).

=== Alumni groups ===
JIPMER alumni, especially those who have graduated from the MBBS course, have formed several alumni communities and organizations.

- The largest is a virtual community called Jipmernet where alumni from all over the globe are active participants. An active online forum called Jipmerites Forum attracts alumni from all over the globe.
- The oldest alumni organization is the JIPMER Alumni Association (JAA) that organizes an annual meet the first weekend of August at JIPMER that is attended by alumni from India and abroad.
- Regional alumni organizations include the JIPMER Alumni Association of North America (JAANA) and the JIPMER Alumni Association of the United Kingdom (JAAUK).

== Minimum Qualification Cut-off ==
=== MBBS Course via NEET ===
Year	GEN Rank	OBC Rank	SC Rank	ST Rank	EWS Rank	PWD Rank
2022	302	5382	46025	111680	1060	137101
2023	277	592	3985	29335	1576	49182
2024	350	867	6617	8697	1485	140950
2025	260	748	3877	5102	1624	33869

=== Minimum Qualifying score in NEET 2025 for MBBS ===
GENERAL	OBC	EWS	SC	ST	GEN PWD	OBC PWD	EWS PWD	SC PWD
660	645	630	570	555	415	330	375	265

== Alumni ==
- Paramasivam Natarajan, photochemist, Shanti Swarup Bhatnagar Prize (1984) awardee
- K R Balakrishnan, heart surgeon, performed the first permanent artificial heart transplant in India with HeartMate II LVAD
- Mathuram Santosham -Professor and chair at the Johns Hopkins Bloomberg School of Public Health.

== See also ==
- List of medical colleges in India
- List of medical schools
- Medical college in India
- Atal Bihari Vajpayee Institute of Medical Sciences and Dr. RML Hospital, New Delhi
- National Institute of Mental Health and Neurosciences, Bengaluru
- Postgraduate Institute of Medical Education and Research, Chandigarh
- PGIMER and Capital Hospital, Bhubaneswar
- Sanjay Gandhi Postgraduate Institute of Medical Sciences, Lucknow
