= Radhe Shyam =

2022 film by Radha Krishna Kumar

- Theatrical release poster
- Directed by: Radha Krishna Kumar
- Written by: Radha Krishna Kumar
- Produced by: Vamsi–Pramod; Praseedha; Bhushan Kumar
- Starring: Prabhas; Pooja Hegde
- Cinematography: Manoj Paramahamsa
- Edited by: Kotagiri Venkateswara Rao
- Music by: Songs: Justin Prabhakaran (Telugu); Mithoon (Hindi); Manan Bhardwaj (Hindi); Amaal Mallik (Hindi); Score: S. Thaman (Telugu); Sanchit Balhara and Ankit Balhara (Hindi)
- Production companies: UV Creations; T-Series Films
- Distributed by: AA Films
- Release date: 11 March 2022
- Running time: 138 minutes
- Country: India
- Languages: Telugu; Hindi
- Budget: ₹200–350 crore (Note: Hindustan Times reported budget was ₹200 crore. The Indian Express, and Outlook reported it to be ₹300 crore. India Today, News 18 and The Times of India said that the budget was ₹350 crore.)
- Box office: est. ₹140–214 crore (Note: Hindustan Times reported gross was ₹140 crore. News18 said that the collection was ₹200 crore. The Times of India and India Today said that the collection was ₹214.04 crore.)

Radhe Shyam is a 2022 Indian period romantic drama film written and directed by Radha Krishna Kumar. Produced by UV Creations and T-Series, the film was shot simultaneously in Telugu and Hindi languages and stars Prabhas and Pooja Hegde while Bhagyashree, Krishnam Raju (Telugu) / Sathyaraj (Hindi), Kunaal Roy Kapur and Jayaram play supporting roles. Set in 1970s Italy, the film revolves around a renowned young astrologer named Vikramaditya, who is conflicted between his destiny and his love for girlfriend Prerana.

The film's score was composed by Thaman S for the Telugu version while Sanchit Balhara and Ankit Balhara too composed for the Hindi version. The film has two soundtracks: One Hindi and one Telugu. Mithoon, Amaal Mallik, and Manan Bhardwaj composed the Hindi songs while Justin Prabhakaran composed the Telugu songs. The cinematography was handled by Manoj Paramahamsa and the editing was done by Kotagiri Venkateswara Rao. Principal photography of the film commenced in October 2018 and ended in July 2021, with filming taking place in Hyderabad, Italy, London, and Georgia. It employed On-set virtual production technology for a scene set in London.

Originally planned for a release on 30 July 2021, it was delayed due to the COVID-19 pandemic. Radhe Shyam was theatrically released on 11 March 2022 and received mixed reviews from critics, who praised the cast performances (especially Prabhas and Hegde), music, and production values, but criticised the screenplay and narration. The film grossed ₹140 crore (US$15 million)–₹214 crore (US$22 million) worldwide to become the third highest-grossing Telugu film of the year. However, owing to its huge budget of over ₹200 crore (US$21 million)–₹350 crore (US$36 million), the film ended up as a box-office bomb.

The film also marked Krishnam Raju‘s last film before his death in September 2022.

== Plot ==
In 1978, Vikramaditya alias "Aditya" is a world-renowned palmist based in Italy. Dubbed the "Einstein of palmistry" and serving as the chief disciple of the spiritual saint Paramahamsa, his reputation peaked after he correctly read the palm of Indian Prime Minister Indira Gandhi and predicted the declaration of the Emergency. Despite his fame, Aditya is a self-proclaimed playboy who fundamentally disbelieves in love. His worldview shifts when he meets Dr. Prerana, a beautiful yet clumsy physician, during a train journey. Fascinated by her, he later traces her to her hospital and proposes a casual, flirtatious relationship. Though initially insulted, Prerana eventually relents and agrees to date him, despite warnings from her uncle, Dean Chakravarthy.

The narrative intensifies when Aditya reads the palm of Anand Rajput, the ambitious son of a powerful Indian tycoon, and predicts that Rajput is destined to inherit his father’s commercial empire rather than succeed in politics. Outraged, Rajput's henchmen pursue Aditya, resulting in a severe vehicular accident that lands him in Prerana’s hospital. Later, while traveling on a passenger train, a commuter begs Aditya to read the palm of his daughter, Tara, an aspiring archer. Aditya bluntly predicts she has no future in sports and should focus strictly on academics. Disturbed when the entire coach crowds him for readings, Aditya abruptly exits the train with Prerana. Moments later, he suddenly realizes that every passenger on that train shared an identical, immediate death line. He frantically attempts to signal the train to stop, but fails; that evening, the train derails, causing mass casualties.

Deeply unnerved and starting to believe in his clairvoyance, Prerana asks Aditya to read her palm. He explicitly predicts that she will live a long, healthy life, but she immediately collapses with a severe nosebleed. Hospitalization reveals a devastating truth: Prerana is suffering from an incurable terminal tumor and has only months to live. When Aditya aggressively insists his long-life prediction cannot be wrong, Chakravarthy expels him, viewing him as a fraud. To test his legitimacy, Chakravarthy presents Aditya with the palm prints of five deceased individuals. When Aditya correctly deduces the exact medical demises of all five, the skeptical doctor accepts his authenticity. Soon after, a sudden breakthrough medical cure for Prerana's specific tumor is discovered, validating Aditya's long-life prediction.

An overjoyed Prerana proposes to Aditya, but he breaks her heart by rejecting her, reiterating his lack of a love line and his impending departure from the country. Prerana discovers Aditya's personal diary. The journal entries reveal that Aditya knew his long-life prediction for her meant that fate would demand his own life as a cosmic substitute, and he was fully prepared to die for her. Moved by his unspoken sacrifice, Prerana requests a final ballroom dance and an intimate night together before leaving a note declaring she will die so he can live. She purposefully drives her car into a massive collision.

In London for his mother’s dance recital, Aditya reads Prerana's note and contacts the hospital, learning she is in critical condition. In a crisis of faith regarding destiny, he crosses paths with Tara, who lost her arm in the train derailment. Tara remarks that since she no longer possesses a palm, she is entirely free to write her own future. Inspired, Aditya rushes to return to Italy, boarding a cargo ship commanded by an acquaintance. En route, the vessel is caught in a catastrophic ocean storm. Following the crew's evacuation, Aditya is trapped alone on the fracturing vessel. Remembering his guru’s ultimate teaching, that palmistry is only 99% accurate because 1% of humanity possesses the sheer willpower to rewrite their fate, Aditya fights the elements, scales the sinking wreckage, and fires a flare gun.

The captain returns via lifeboat to rescue him. Though initially drowned, Aditya survives and arrives at the hospital, where he reunites with a fully recovered Prerana. Abandoning his fatalism, Aditya proposes marriage, which she happily accepts. The film concludes with Tara winning a medal in Paralympic archery and Aditya and Prerana celebrating their wedding.

== Cast ==
- Prabhas as Vikramaditya "Aditya"
- Pooja Hegde as Dr. Prerana Chakravarthy
- Krishnam Raju as Paramahamsa (in Telugu) (Note: Krishnam Raju appears in place of Sathyaraj in the regional version for Telugu whereas Sathyaraj appears in both versions in the United States.)
- Sathyaraj as Paramahamsa (in Hindi)
- Bhagyashree as Girija Rani
- Kunaal Roy Kapur as Vedant
- Sachin Khedekar as Dean Dev Chakravarthy
- Priyadarshi as Subbarao
- Murali Sharma as Jagat Chakravarthy
- Riddhi Kumar as Tara
- Sathyan as Anand Rajput's assistant
- Beena Banerjee as Prerana's grandmother
- Anuradha Patel as Madhuri
- Flora Jacob as Indira Gandhi
- Sasha Chettri as Nithya
- Surya as a scientist (in Telugu) (Note: Surya appears in place of Thalaivasal Vijay in the regional version for Telugu whereas Thalaivasal Vijay appears in both versions in the United States.)
- Thalaivasal Vijay as a scientist (in Hindi)

Special appearances

- Jagapathi Babu as Anand Rajput
- Jayaram as the ship captain

Narrator

- S. S. Rajamouli (in Telugu)
- Amitabh Bachchan (in Hindi)

== Production ==
=== Development ===
The story was originally conceived by director Chandra Sekhar Yeleti. He worked with his assistant Radha Krishna Kumar to develop the script but the idea was dropped after they failed to give it a conclusion. Kumar borrowed the storyline from Yeleti, and worked on it for eighteen years to give the story a satisfactory ending. He narrated the script to actor Prabhas while he was shooting for the Baahubali series (2015–17). Prabhas liked the script and signed up for the project.

Kumar initially wanted to set the story in the backdrop of a hill station in India. However, the story was moved to Europe following Prabhas' suggestion. The romantic drama takes place in 1970's Europe. Kumar revealed that the protagonist Vikramaditya's character is inspired by real life European palmist Cheiro.

The film was formally launched on 5 September 2018 in Hyderabad, tentatively titled as Prabhas 20. Pooja Hegde was cast opposite Prabhas. Hegde called the film a "fresh and mature love story". Veteran actress Bhagyashree is cast in a crucial role in the film. Several titles including Jaan (transl. Life) and O Dear were considered for the film, before finalising Radhe Shyam which symbolises love between Hindu god Krishna and goddess Radha.

=== Filming ===
The film is shot simultaneously in Telugu and Hindi languages. Principal photography commenced on 6 October 2018. Filming took place in Hyderabad, Turin (Italy) and Georgia, after which it was suspended due to COVID-19 pandemic in March 2020. Filming resumed in Italy in October 2020. In December 2020, several scenes were shot at the Falaknuma Palace in Hyderabad. Final schedule of the film began on 25 June 2021 in Hyderabad. While much of the film was shot on location in London, a particular scene featuring Prabhas in London was shot in India using virtual production technology. Filming was completed on 28 July 2021.

== Music ==
The film has distinct Hindi and Telugu albums. The Hindi soundtrack is composed by Mithoon and Manan Bhardwaj while Justin Prabhakaran is composing the songs in the Telugu version (in addition to Tamil, Kannada, and Malayalam versions). Manoj Muntashir and Krishna Kanth are providing lyrics for Hindi and Telugu soundtrack respectively.

== Release ==
=== Theatrical ===
Radhe Shyam was released in cinemas on 11 March 2022. Earlier, the film was scheduled to release on 30 July 2021, however, it was postponed due to the COVID-19 pandemic in India. Later in July 2021, it was announced that the film will be released on 14 January 2022 but in early-January, UV Creations announced that film was postponed due to the Omicron variant. In February 2022, it was announced that the film is scheduled to be released on 11 March 2022. The film was released in Telugu, Hindi, Tamil, Kannada, and Malayalam languages.

The film had done a pre-release business of ₹210 crore from the sale of theatrical rights.

=== Home media ===
The film's satellite rights were acquired by Zee Entertainment Enterprises in all languages, while the digital distribution rights were acquired by Amazon Prime Video. Zee News stated "The film has fetched its makers a whopping amount of Rs 200 crores just from the satellite and digital rights before it hit the screens". The film began streaming on Prime Video in Telugu, Tamil, Kannada, and Malayalam on 1 April 2022. The Hindi version started streaming on Netflix after 3 May 2022. The Hindi version is also available on ZEE5.

== Reception ==
=== Box office ===
According to the makers, the film had a total worldwide gross of ₹79 crore on its opening day. On the third day the film had a worldwide gross of ₹32 crore making the opening weekend collection ₹151 crore gross.

As of 14 March 2022, the film had a total worldwide gross of ₹165.18 crore. Jatinder Singh of Pinkvilla wrote that "The film is a big disaster at the box office as the film netted ₹99.50 crore from 4 days in India and it is even difficult for the film to reach even ₹125 crore". The makers claimed that the film grossed ₹200 crore at the box office in 10 days, however, The Indian Express reported, "the other estimates put the film's worldwide collection so far well below the Rs 150 crore mark." The film had a huge dip in its collections on its first Monday with ₹1.5 crore (nett).

=== Critical response ===
On the review aggregator website Rotten Tomatoes, 20% of 10 critics' reviews are positive, with an average rating of 4.6/10.

Deccan Herald stated that reviews were mixed to positive, and received praise for the performances (particularly Prabhas and Pooja Hegde), music direction and production values. The Times of India stated that reviews were mixed. DNA India and The Indian Express reported that reviews were mixed to negative, stating that the writing and narration met with criticism. Hindustan Times mentioned that reviews were negative.

A reviewer from The Hans India gave the film a rating of 3.5/5 and wrote "Prabhas aka Vikramaditya and Pooja Hegde aka Perana's heart-touching love story showcases how love wins the destiny!" Sowmya Rajendran of The News Minute gave the film a rating of 3/5 and stated "Though the lead pair is likable together, they're not really convincing as epic lovers like Radhe-Shyam, after whom the film is titled." Rachana Dubey of The Times of India gave the film a rating of 2.5/5 and wrote "The bland chemistry between Pooja and Prabhas is a deterrent in this love story. The VFX deserves an applause, and adds to the visual quality of the film." Janani K of India Today gave the film a rating of 2.5/5 and wrote "Prabhas and Pooja Hegde's Radhe Shyam has great potential in its premise. However, apart from brilliant visuals and production design, the film lacks soul". A reviewer from Pinkvilla gave the film a rating of 2.5/5 and wrote "Prabhas is sincere in some scenes but looks demotivated when the writing fails him. Thaman's background music lacks novelty."

A Deccan Chronicle critic gave the film a rating of 2.5/5 and wrote "Perhaps better and stronger writing could have taken Radhe Shyam to a different level." Saibal Chatterjee of NDTV gave the film a rating of 2/5 and wrote "Prabhas and Pooja Hegde are saddled with a screenplay that allows them little room for manoeuvre. The end result is calamitous." Siby Jeyya of India Herald gave the film a rating of 2/5 and wrote "The first half of the film is artistically and visually stunning. The second period is slow and complex on the surdata-face. Even though the film isn't genuinely bad, it still felt like wasting our money and time." Shubhra Gupta of The Indian Express gave the film a rating of 1/5 and wrote "Prabhas-starrer expects us to swallow, hook, line and so many sinkers, and we are constantly collecting our jaws off the floor."

Sangeetha Devi Dundoo of The Hindu stated "A shallow story and lacklustre screenplay make Radhe Shyam a colossal bore." Monika Rawal Kukreja of Hindustan Times stated "Prabhas and Pooja Hegde's film is packed with romance, songs, VFX, grand outdoors but not a lot of logic or good writing." Sonil Dedhia of News18 stated "The Prabhas and Pooja Hegde starrer ends up as one of those big budget attempts that's highly ambitious and silly at the same time."
