= PTron =

Indian electronics company

- Type: Private
- Industry: Electronics
- Founded: 2014; 12 years ago
- Founder: Ameen Khwaja
- Headquarters: Hyderabad, Telangana, India
- Area served: India, United States, Canada, Italy, Romania, Indonesia, Malaysia, Tunisia, Fiji, Myanmar, Nepal, Colombia, Bangladesh, Ghana
- Key people: Palem Srikanth Reddy (Chairman); Ameen Khwaja (Founder / CEO); Harish Naidu (Director)
- Products: Electronic accessories
- Revenue: ▲₹34.55 crore (Q2 FY 2020-21)
- Number of employees: 200+
- Parent: Palred Electronics Private Limited
- Website: www.ptron.in

PTron (pronounced as P-Tron) is an Indian electronics manufacturer, headquartered in Hyderabad. PTron is a brand owned by Palred Electronics Private Limited, which is a subsidiary of Palred Technologies Ltd, a public-listed company on BSE and NSE since 2004. PTron sells products like Bluetooth headsets, portable Bluetooth speakers, wired headsets, chargers and cables, smart watches and networking products.

== History and operations ==
PTron was founded in 2014 by Ameen Khwaja, CEO of Palred Electronics (a subsidiary of Palred Technologies). In 2015, it opened an office in Shenzhen, China and began manufacturing products from there. In its first two years of launch, the company claimed to have recorded ₹50 crore in sales, (as of 2019, equals US$7.04 million) having sold more than one million products. As of 2019, the company has sold over 5 million mobile accessories including headphones, bluetooth audio devices, smartwatches and power banks. The company initially sold products through its retail platform LatestOne, before expanding to other e-commerce platforms such as Amazon, Flipkart and Snapdeal.

As of 2019, PTron sells its products in various countries such as United States, Canada, Italy, Myanmar, Hong Kong, Israel and Indonesia. According to Khwaja, Hyderabad, Chennai and Delhi are the major markets for the company within India, while selling products through more than 1000 offline stores in other cities. By 2018, the company had more than 40 distributors in 12 states in India.

In August 2019, PTron announced its plans to set up an assembly plant in Hyderabad (under Make in India) which is expected to handle two-thirds of its manufacturing requirements. In October 2019, PTron launched Bass Buds TWS (True Wireless Stereo) earbuds which sold over 10,000 units within the first three days. In August 2020, the company signed up Bollywood actor Aparshakti Khurana to endorse the brand. PTron registered sales of 7.87 lakh units in the second quarter of FY 2020–21, up from 2.67 lakh units in the first quarter. In July 2021, Pooja Hegde signed as new brand ambassador.
