= Somu Sound Engineer =

2024 Kannada Language Films

- Theatrical release poster
- Directed by: Abhi
- Written by: Abhi; Maasthi (dialogues)
- Produced by: Christopher Kini
- Starring: Shrestha; Shruthi Patil
- Cinematography: Shiva Sena
- Edited by: Deepu S Kumar
- Music by: Charan Raj
- Production company: Aartha Entertainers
- Distributed by: Jayanna Combines
- Release date: 15 March 2024
- Running time: 132 minutes
- Country: India
- Language: Kannada

Somu Sound Engineer is a 2024 Indian Kannada-language film directed by Abhi, making his debut, and produced by Christopher Kini. The film stars Shrestha, Shruthi Patil, Jahangir, Girish Jatti, Yash Shetty, and Apoorva.

== Synopsis ==
Somu lives in the city without a job, hanging out with his friends, fighting with boys, something happens in his life that changes his life. How he changes because of that. What is the path of his life and what will happen to the hero in the future is the summary of the story of this film.

== Cast ==
- Shrestha as Somu
- Shruthi Patil as Somu's Love Interest
- Jahangir
- Girish Jatti
- Yash Shetty
- Apoorva

== Production ==
The technical team of Tagaru and Salaga after being impressed with the results of their previous works and their appreciation joined the crew. They cast Shrestha as the lead actor and Shruthi Patil was paired alongside him.

"Unlike films where the cast usually takes precedence over the technical team, this one will see a set of technicians, who have been around in the industry for more than a decade and have carved a niche for themselves, coming together to back a new director and young actors", said Maasthi who co-wrote the dialogues for the film. Director Suri contributed his part by writing the nameboard and title design for the film.

The film was shot in the Koodalasangama area of Ilakal Ganjihala in Hunagunda taluk of Bagalkote district.

== Soundtrack ==
Somu Sound Engineer

Soundtrack album by Charan Raj
- Released: 2024
- Genre: Feature film soundtrack
- Length: 8:22
- Language: Kannada
- Label: A2 Music
- Producer: Charan Raj

Charan Raj chronology
Bad Manners (2023)	Somu Sound Engineer (2024)

Charan Raj composed the background score and soundtrack of the film.

Track listing
No.	Title	Lyrics	Singer(s)	Length
1.	"Soma Soma"	Dhananjay Ranjan	Swaroop Khan	4:06
2.	"Chandasina Chandadalli"	Dhananjay Ranjan	Sidhartha Belmannu, Meghana Bhat	4:16
Total length:				8:22

== Release ==
The film was released on 15 March 2024.

== Reception ==
Harish Basavarajaiah for The Times of India rated 3.5 out of 5 stars and wrote "Director Abhi Basavraj has naturally brought in that rural set-up to theatres."

A Sharadhaa from The New Indian Express rated 2.5 out of 5 and stated "The portrayal of Somu’s journey maintains its realistic tone, though the fault lies in stretching the narrative, Initially, the viewers are presented with a clear image of Somu and his struggles with anger issues, and at one point, you don’t want to know more about it, but this gets extensively explored before introducing significant plot twists at the interval."

A critic of Times Now rated 3 out of 5 stars and wrote "The love story that comes along with a good number by music director Charan Raj is noteworthy."
