= M. N. Ghosh =

Indian pharmacologist (1924–2021)

Manindra Nath Ghosh (1924 – 28 October 2021) was an Indian pharmacologist who was the first director of Jawaharlal Institute of Postgraduate Medical Education & Research (JIPMER) in Puducherry, India.

== Early life and education ==
After attending R. G. Kar Medical College and Hospital for his undergraduate studies, Ghosh moved on to do his Ph.D. in Pharmacology at the University College London, graduating in 1956. His grandfather Prof. Rakhaldas Ghosh (1851-1902) was the Professor and Head of the Materia Medica (now Dept. of Pharmacology), Calcutta Medical College. His father Prof. Birendra Nath Ghosh (6. 2. 1882 - 3. 11. 1957) was also a very renowned pharmacologist of India.

== Career ==
Ghosh was the author of Fundamentals of Experimental Pharmacology. The book was originally written in 1971, and has been published in seven editions since. Ghosh's work was cited by James Black (pharmacologist) in his acceptance of the 1988 Nobel Prize for Physiology or Medicine.

As a result of his work, Ghosh was a recipient of the Dr. B. C. Roy Award in 1980.

== Personal life and death ==
Ghosh died at his home in Kolkata, on 28 October 2021, at the age of 97. He was survived by his three daughters.
