= Central Salt and Marine Chemicals Research Institute =

Natural science laboratory in India

Central Salt and Marine Chemicals Research Institute (formerly Central Salt Research Institute) is a constituent laboratory of the Council of Scientific and Industrial Research (CSIR), India. The institute was inaugurated by Jawahar Lal Nehru on 10 April 1954 at Bhavnagar, in Gujarat.

== Technology developed ==
- Preparations of nutrient-rich salt of plant origins
- Electrodialysis domestic desalination system
- Preparation of novel iodizing agent
- "Clean Write" writing chalk
- Preparation of low sodium salt of botanic origin
- Plastic Chip Electrodes

== Research activity ==
- Molecular sensors for selective recognition of cations/anions
- Recognition of analytes and neutral molecules in physiological condition
- Supramolecular metal complexes to study photo-induced energy/electron transfer processes
- Nanocrystalline dye-sensitized solar cells (DSSC)
- Smart Materials
- Tailored and modified electrodes.
- Green Chemistry
- Polymer Chemistry and development of novel drug delivery system
- Pharmaceutical Biotechnology and Natural products
- Recovery of precious metal ions from natural sources
- Crystal engineering
- Computational Study
- Electrochemical/chemical value addition processes
- Development of polyethylene based inter polymer membranes and design of electrodialysis units
