= Mathuram Santosham =

American Indian physician and scientist

- Born: Vellore
- Education: Jawaharlal Institute of Postgraduate Medical Education and Research; Johns Hopkins University
- Scientific career
- Workplaces: Johns Hopkins Bloomberg School of Public Health

Mathuram Santosham is an Indian American physician who is Professor and chair at the Johns Hopkins Bloomberg School of Public Health. Santosham is best known for his work on oral rehydration therapy and childhood vaccines, with a focus on supporting people from indigenous communities.

== Early life and education ==
Santosham was born to John Wilfred Santosham and Flora Selvanayagam in Vellore. His father was part of the Indian diplomatic service. He didn't enter a proper classroom until he was eight years old. At the age of twelve, Santosham moved to Glasgow, where he attended boarding school. Even at that young age, Santosham knew that he wanted to become a physician, and he was mentored by his teacher, Miss Grant. He studied medicine at the Jawaharlal Institute of Postgraduate Medical Education and Research in Pondicherry. In the final year of his degree he received word that his mother, Flora, had suffered a significant stroke and died whilst visiting family in Baltimore. After graduating in 1970, Santosham moved to the Baltimore, where he enrolled in a training programme at the Church Home and Hospital. Disappointed by the programme, Santosham joined Johns Hopkins University, where he was mentored by Bradley Sack. There he earned a Master of Public Health and became board certified.

== Research and career ==
In the early 1980s, Santosham worked on the health of Native American and Alaska Native communities. His research looked to learn from the heritage of Southwestern tribes and improve tribal health through training and empowerment. He considered health issues that were most crucial to Native communities, including infectious diseases, substance abuse, HIV/AIDS and diabetes. As part of this work, Santosham championed the use of the oral rehydration therapy (now known as pedialyte) to treat diarrheal dehydration. At the time, the medical community were skeptical about the effectiveness of pedialyte. Santosham reformulated the treatment, training a team of outreach workers to support parents in identifying the recommended doses. Santosham established a successful research trial in the Fort Apache Indian Reservation which both demonstrated the impact of pedialyte and showed that sick infants get better faster if they ate food throughout their illness. It was later estimated that this treatment had saved fifty million lives. In 1991 Santosham founded the Johns Hopkins Center for American Indian Health (CAIH), which he directed for fifteen years.

In North America, Native Americans are considerably more likely to die of vaccine-preventable diseases. Santosham led efficacy trials for several childhood vaccinations, including rotavirus, influenza type B and the pneumococcal vaccine. Santosham worked closely with Native American communities to disseminate these vaccinations. His efficacy studies of the Haemophilus influenzae type b (Hib) conjugate vaccine in Navajo children resulted in the near-elimination of the virus in North America. He subsequently launched the $37 million GAVI Alliance Hib Initiative, which looked to deploy the conjugated vaccine in developing countries. When the study started, only 20% of countries eligible for support from GAVI had introduced the vaccination. By 2014, over 95% of GAVI eligible countries had introduce the vaccine into their national immunisation programmes. GAVI estimated that the vaccination would have saved seven million lives by 2020.

== Awards and honours ==
- 1988 Thrasher Research Fund Award for Excellence in Research
- 2006 International Symposium on Pneumococcas and Pneumococcal Disease Bob Austrian Orator
- 2008 Indian Health Service Directors Award for Career Service
- 2011 Sabin Vaccine Institute Albert Sabin Gold Medal Award
- 2013 Radha Pathak Humanitarian Award
- 2014 Centers for Disease Control and Prevention Fries Prize for Improving Health

== Select publications ==
- Baqui, Abdullah H; El-Arifeen, Shams; Darmstadt, Gary L; Ahmed, Saifuddin; Williams, Emma K; Seraji, Habibur R; Mannan, Ishtiaq; Rahman, Syed M; Shah, Rasheduzzaman; Saha, Samir K; Syed, Uzma (2008). "Effect of community-based newborn-care intervention package implemented through two service-delivery strategies in Sylhet district, Bangladesh: a cluster-randomised controlled trial". The Lancet. 371 (9628): 1936–1944. doi:10.1016/s0140-6736(08)60835-1. ISSN 0140-6736. PMID 18539225. S2CID 37787388.
- Baqui, Abdullah H; El-Arifeen, Shams; Darmstadt, Gary L; Ahmed, Saifuddin; Williams, Emma K; Seraji, Habibur R; Mannan, Ishtiaq; Rahman, Syed M; Shah, Rasheduzzaman; Saha, Samir K; Syed, Uzma (2008). "Effect of community-based newborn-care intervention package implemented through two service-delivery strategies in Sylhet district, Bangladesh: a cluster-randomised controlled trial". The Lancet. 371 (9628): 1936–1944. doi:10.1016/s0140-6736(08)60835-1. ISSN 0140-6736. PMID 18539225. S2CID 37787388.
- Kumar, Vishwajeet; Mohanty, Saroj; Kumar, Aarti; Misra, Rajendra P; Santosham, Mathuram; Awasthi, Shally; Baqui, Abdullah H; Singh, Pramod; Singh, Vivek; Ahuja, Ramesh C; Singh, Jai Vir (2008). "Effect of community-based behaviour change management on neonatal mortality in Shivgarh, Uttar Pradesh, India: a cluster-randomised controlled trial". The Lancet. 372 (9644): 1151–1162. doi:10.1016/s0140-6736(08)61483-x. ISSN 0140-6736. PMID 18926277. S2CID 12202840.
