= Radha Krishna Kumar =

Indian film director (born 1984)

- Born: 2 August 1984 (age 41); Visakhapatnam, Andhra Pradesh, India
- Occupation: Writer, film director
- Known for: Radhe Shyam

Radha Krishna Kumar (born 2 August 1984) is an Indian film director and screenwriter who works primarily in Telugu cinema.

== Early life and career ==
He made his directorial debut Jil produced by UV Creations. He worked as an assistant director under Chandra Sekhar Yeleti for the films Anukokunda Oka Roju (2005), Okkadunnadu (2007), Prayanam (2009) and Sahasam (2013). His recent film, with Prabhas titled as Radhe Shyam and produced by UV creations and T-Series, has released on 11 March 2022.

He wrote screenplays and dialogues for Prayanam and Sahasam, for which he worked as 1st assistant director as well. He debuted as a director with Jil (2015).

== Filmography ==
Key
†	Denotes films that have not yet been released

- All films are in Telugu, otherwise noted.

Year	Film	Credited as		Notes
Year	Film	Director	Writer	Notes
2009	Prayanam	No	Dialogues	Co-written with Chandra Sekhar Yeleti
2013	Sahasam	No	Yes	Co-written with Chandra Sekhar Yeleti, Prashanth Sagar and Sumalatha
2015	Jil	Yes	Yes	
2022	Radhe Shyam	Yes	Yes	
