= Neecia Majolly =

Singer, musician, pianist

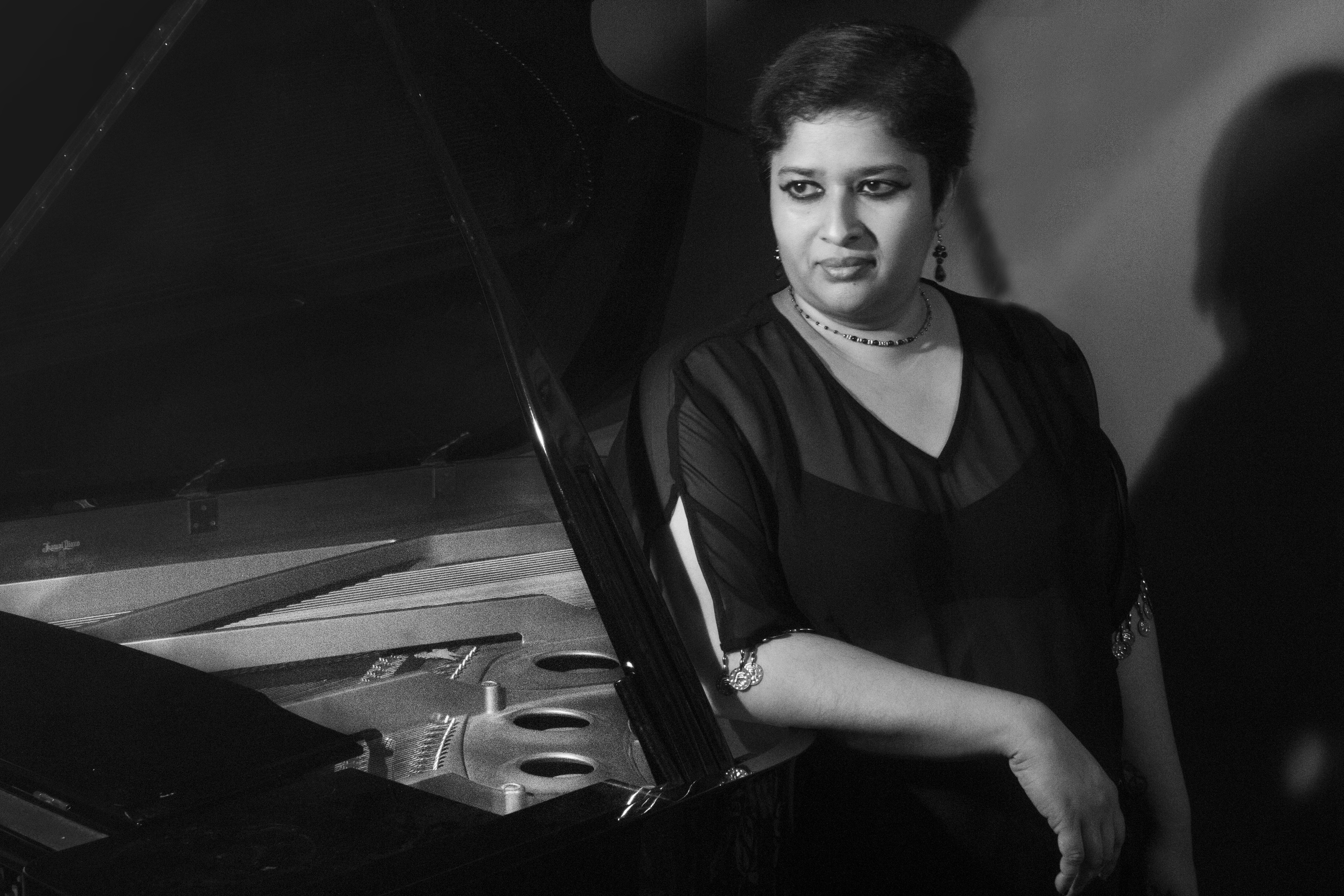
- Neecia Majolly

Background information
- Origin: Brunei Darussalam
- Genres: classical music; alternative rock
- Occupation: Musician
- Instruments: Piano, Voice

Neecia Majolly is an Indian concert pianist, conductor, piano and vocal coach, award winning singer/songwriter and composer.

== Education ==
Majolly began piano lessons under the tutelage of her father when she was just two and a half years old. A child prodigy, she gave her first public recital at 6 years of age. The following year, she became a regular on Radio Televisyen Bruneias a young artist on piano and vocals for the next 7 years.

Her piano mentors have included Marietta Baja, Peter Cooper, Vivien Ngo, John Roberts, and Sergio Snyder. Beginning vocal studies with her father at a later age, her most influential vocal mentor was Shelagh Molyneux (Richardson).

Majolly holds an Associate of La Salle (ALS) from the La Salle College of the Arts, Singapore in both performance and principles of teaching, an Associate of the London College of Music (ALCM) in music theatre, a Licentiate of the Trinity College, London (LTCL) in piano, voice and principles of teaching, a Licentiate of the Royal Schools of Music, London (LRSM) in piano, and the Fellowship of the Trinity College, London (FTCL) in piano, and a B.Mus from the Western Australian Conservatorium, Perth.

== Music career ==
Majolly had several solo performances in Malaysia, Singapore, Western Australia, Brunei, Sweden, USA, India and Nepal and accompanied Russian-American violinist Galina Heifetz through India.

As a piano teacher and vocal coach, Majolly has taught at the Delhi School of Music and the Bangalore School of Music. She mainly teaches privately in Bangalore (including vocal training and interpretative workshops), where she has been living since 1995. Majolly was the President of the Bangalore Society of Performing Arts (BSPA), which she founded in 2000, but had to be shut down because of bankruptcy, and was an artistic adviser to the National Philharmonic of India. She also worked as radio presenter of Western Classical Music in New Delhi from 1993 till 1994, as well as critiquing for Deccan Herald and The Indian Express, from 1995 till 1996. She is an ex All-Karnataka representative of the London College of Music Examinations(LCME). She is also empanelled in the Indian Council of Cultural Relations' Reference Panel of Artistes', as well as being an Advisory Council Member of the Karnataka Artistes Association.

Majolly is the Founder-Trustee of the Majolly Music Trust. The Trust was founded in 2011, to teach young people classical music, fund scholarships for students, open a stage for new artists and provide a pension for retired artists.

Under her baton, two choirs, Madrigals, Etc which specializes in music from the Renaissance period and the Camerata, have "earned a firm reputation in India for being unique in their choice of repertoire and quality of presentation". In 2001 the Camerata-choir staged Handels' "Messiah" in a "mammoth performance" in Bangalore, a historical performance that had never taken place in India before. In October 2009 the choir launched the first ever western classical music album in India, called The Renaissance Begins.

Neecia Majolly's piano album titled "Pure Spa Gold Coast" was published with Universal Audio, USA in 2012, followed by her alternative rock indie-album "Please" in 2017, which was released by her band The Majolly Project. Her third choir, Femusica, which was formed in 2019, is an all-women choir exclusively performing music by women composers. They made their debut in Chennai in September 2019, their performance also included the world premiere of her own composition "Haiku 1" for mezzo soprano and piano.

In 2021 she founded the Neecia Majolly Centre for Performing Arts (NMCPA) in Bangalore.

As writer and convener of the National Kawai Junior Piano Competition, the association with Theme Music Company (India) and Kawai (Japan) opened up a platform for young pianists from all over India to compete on a stage with an expert jury. The competition was closed due to the Covid-19 virus.

Undaunted, Majolly founded her own competition in 2024 - NMCPA (India) Online Western Music Competition which is open to Indian nationals all over the world in classical piano, classical singing and classical guitar.

== Awards ==
In 1992, Majolly was awarded the Stephanie Coleman Prize for Best Graduating Pianist from the Western Australian Conservatorium of Music, Perth. In 1991 she won the Rex Hobcroft Award for Best Pianist at the Inaugural Chamber Music Competition (Western Australian Conservatorium of Music, Perth), and in 2001, the Edgar Fewkes Memorial Award for outstanding musician (voice) in the southern Indian region. Her band The Majolly Project won two Global Music Awards for their debut single "Dark Room" in the categories 'Emerging Global Artist' and 'Best Song' categories. The song has also been nominated for the IMEA Awards in the 'Rock Song of the Year' category in 2015 and 'Rock Artist of the Year' in 2016. The second single "Whitebone" won two silver medals at the Global Music Awards for 'Best Song' and 'Best Video' in September 2015. The Majolly Project also won 'Alternative Artist of the Year' at the 5th IMEA Awards (USA) in June 2018. The fourth single "Fenced Circle" aired on VH1(India) October 12–26, 2018. It also won 'Best Alternative Song' at the 2018 Radio Music Awards and at the Indie Music Channel Awards 2019 (USA). The Majolly Project featured in 'Rolling Stone (India)' on November 6, 2018 and again in November 2019. Both 'Whitebone' and 'Fenced Circle' videos have been nominated at various film festivals like 'Feel the Reel', 'Eurasia Film Festival', 'European International Film Festival', 'Rome Prisma Film Festival' amongst others, and won 4 awards at the Top Indie Film Awards 2019. 'Please' video was nominated at the 2020 Mumbai International Film Festival and won at the 2020 Women’s Freedom Song Contest. Recently, she was the Gold Prize Winner for Composition at the World Classical Music Awards.
