= 2nd South Indian International Movie Awards =

Indian annual film awards event

- Date: 12–13 September 2013
- Official website: Expo Centre Sharjah, United Arab Emirates

Highlights
- Best Picture: Kumki (Tamil); Eega (Telugu); Katariveera Surasundarangi (Kannada); Ustad Hotel (Malayalam)
- Most nominations: Gabbar Singh (Telugu)—13; 3; Kumki; Thuppakki (Tamil)—10; Anna Bond (Kannada)—10 Spirit (Malayalam)—9

Television coverage
- Network: Sun TV Network

The 2nd South Indian International Movie Awards were presented on 12–13 September 2013 in Sharjah, UAE, to honour the best cinematic achievements of the South Indian film industry in the year 2012. Initially planned for 20–21 June, the date was postponed due to "100 years of Indian cinema" jubilee festivities. The ceremony was hosted by Arya, Shriya Saran, Rana Daggubati and Sonu Sood at the Expo Centre Sharjah, while the "Generation Next Awards Night" was hosted a day before by Parvathy Omanakuttan and Ash Chandler. Differing from the 1st SIIMA Awards, technical Awards were presented on the first day as well. Show performances were delivered by Shruthi Haasan, Hansika Motwani, Shriya Saran, Rima Kallingal, Usha Uthup, Pranitha Subhash, Anirudh Ravichander, Ragini Dwivedi, Aindrita Ray, Andrea Jeremiah, Parul Yadav, Remya Nambeesan, Lakshmi Menon, Regina Cassandra and Meera Nandan.

Five new award categories were added for the 2nd SIIMA Awards ceremony: Best Debutant Producer, Best Actor in a Supporting Role, Best Actress in a Supporting Role, Best Fight Choreographer and Best Dance Choreographer. The organizers also introduced a Critics' Award in all lead actor and actress categories, raising the total sum of handed over awards to 94.

Nominated by a team of veteran professionals the final winners were decided by a public voting system. The most nominations were announced for the Telugu film Gabbar Singh (13), while in Tamil 3, Kumki and Thuppakki started with ten nominations each. Anna Bond (Kannada, 10) and Spirit (Malayalam, 9) were also favourites at the 2nd SIIMA Awards. Overall, 43 films were awarded at least one SIIMA Award. Out of these, Gabbar Singh (6 awards), Addhuri (5), Kumki, Thuppakki (4 each), 3, Eega, Anna Bond, Spirit and Thattathin Marayathu (3 each) were awarded more than two times. For their contributions as leading actresses in South Indian cinema Trisha and Kavya Madhavan were each bestowed with an honorary award. K. J. Yesudas and Sowcar Janaki were honoured with the SIIMA Lifetime Achievement Award.

== Honorary awards ==
=== Lifetime Achievement Award ===
- K. J. Yesudas
- Sowcar Janaki

=== Special appreciation ===
- Kavya Madhavan
- Trisha

== Main awards ==
=== Film ===
Best Film
Tamil	Telugu
Kumki – N. Subhash Chandra Bose and N. Linguswamy; Thuppakki – S. Thanu; Sundarapandian – Company productions; Pizza – C. V. Kumar; Vazhakku Enn 18/9 – N. Subhash Chandra Bose and N. Linguswamy	Eega – Korrapati Ranganatha Sai; Gabbar Singh – Bandla Ganesh; Ishq – N. Sudheer Reddy, Vikram Gowd; Julai – S. Radha Krishna, D.V.V. Danayya; Poola Rangadu – R. R. Venkat, Atchi Reddy
Kannada	Malayalam
Katariveera Surasundarangi – Munirathna; Krantiveera Sangolli Rayanna – Ananda Appugola; Anna Bond – Raghavendra Rajkumar; Addhuri – CMR Shankar Reddy; Drama – Jayanna, Bhogendra	Ustad Hotel – Listin Stephen; Ayalum Njanum Thammil – Prem Prakash; Spirit – Antony Perumbavoor; Ozhimuri – P. N. Venugopal; Diamond Necklace – Lal Jose
Best Director
Tamil	Telugu
Balaji Sakthivel – Vazhakku Enn 18/9; Prabhu Solomon – Kumki; AR Murugadoss – Thuppakki; S. R. Prabhakaran – Sundarapandian; K. V. Anand – Maattrraan	Harish Shankar – Gabbar Singh; S. S. Rajamouli – Eega; Vikram Kumar – Ishq; Trivikram Srinivas – Julai; Puri Jagannadh – Businessman
Kannada	Malayalam
A. P. Arjun – Addhuri; Duniya Soori – Anna Bond; Suresh Krishna – Katari Veera Surasundarangi; Naganna – Krantiveera Sangolli Rayanna; Yogaraj Bhat – Drama	Lal Jose – Ayalum Njanum Thammil; Anwar Rasheed – Ustad Hotel; Aashiq Abu – 22 Female Kottayam; Vineeth Sreenivasan – Thattathin Marayathu; Madhupal – Ozhimuri
Best Cinematographer
Tamil	Telugu
Sukumar – Kumki; Vijay Milton – Vazhakku Enn 18/9; Gopi Amarnath – Pizza; Balasubramaniem – Neerparavai; Premkumar – Sundarapandian	K. K. Senthil Kumar – Eega; Shyam K. Naidu – Businessman; Jayanan Vincent – Gabbar Singh; P. C. Sreeram – Ishq; Chota K. Naidu – Dhamarukam
Kannada	Malayalam
Surya S Kiran – Addhuri; H. C. Venu – Katari Veera Surasundarangi; Ramesh Babu – Krantiveera Sangolli Rayanna; Krishna – Rambo; Sathya Hegde – Anna Bond	Sameer Thahir – Diamond Necklace; Jomon T. John – Thattathin Marayathu; Lokanathan – Ustad Hotel; Venu – Spirit; Azhagappan – Ozhimuri

=== Acting ===
Best Actor
Tamil	Telugu
Dhanush – 3; Vijay Sethupathi – Pizza (Critics Award); Vijay – Thuppakki; Vishnu – Neerparavai; Suriya – Maattrraan	Pawan Kalyan – Gabbar Singh; Rana Daggubati – Krishnam Vande Jagadgurum (Critics Award); Mahesh Babu – Businessman; Nagarjuna – Shirdi Sai; Allu Arjun – Julai; Ram Charan – Racha
Kannada	Malayalam
Shivarajkumar – Shiva; Upendra – Katariveera Surasundarangi (Critics Award); Darshan – Krantiveera Sangolli Rayanna; Puneeth Rajkumar – Anna Bond; Duniya Vijay – Bheema Theeradalli	Mohanlal – Spirit; Fahadh Faasil – Diamond Necklace (Critics Award); Prithviraj – Ayalum Njanum Thammil; Lal – Ozhimuri; Manoj K. Jayan – Ardhanaari
Best Actress
Tamil	Telugu
Hansika Motwani – Oru Kal Oru Kannadi; Kajal Aggarwal – Thuppakki (Critics Award); Amala Paul – Kadhalil Sodhappuvadhu Yeppadi; Shruti Haasan – 3; Samantha Ruth Prabhu – Neethane En Ponvasantham	Shruti Haasan – Gabbar Singh; Nayantara – Krishnam Vande Jagadgurum (Critics Award); Kajal Aggarwal – Businessman; Samantha Ruth Prabhu – Eega
Kannada	Malayalam
Priyamani – Chaarulatha; Ragini Dwivedi – Shiva (Critics Award); Pranitha Subhash – Bheema Theeradalli; Ramya – Sidlingu; Radhika Pandit – Addhuri	Amala Paul – Run Baby Run; Rima Kallingal – 22 Female Kottayam (Critics Award); Kavya Madhavan – Bavuttiyude Namathil; Swetha Menon – Ithra Mathram; Revathi – Molly Aunty Rocks!
Best Actor in a Supporting Role
Tamil	Telugu
R. Madhavan – Vettai; Prakash Raj – Dhoni; Thambi Ramaiah – Saattai; Satyaraj – Nanban; Ponvannan – Neerparavai	Rajendra Prasad – Julai; Prakash Raj – Dhamarukam; Kota Srinivasa Rao – Krishnam Vande Jagadgurum; Ajay – Ishq; Nassar – Businessman
Kannada	Malayalam
Rangayana Raghu – Romeo; Ambareesh – Drama; Yogi – Yaare Koogadali; Doddanna – Katari Veera Surasundarangi; Raghu Mukherjee – Dandupalya	Nandu – Spirit; Prathap K. Pothan – Ayalum Njanum Thammil; Thilakan † – Ustad Hotel; Sunny Wayne – Second Show; Thalaivasal Vijay – Karmayogi
Best Actress in a Supporting Role
Tamil	Telugu
Saranya Ponvannan – Neerparavai; Viji Chandrasekhar – Aarohanam; Nandita Das – Neerparavai; Radhika Apte – Dhoni; Urmila Mahanta – Vazhakku Enn 18/9	Saloni – Bodyguard; Sindhu Tolani – Ishq; Suhasini Maniratnam – Gabbar Singh; Amala – Life Is Beautiful; Bhanupriya – Dhammu
Kannada	Malayalam
Nidhi Subbaiah – Anna Bond; Rekha Vedavyas – Govindaya Namaha; Sindhu Lokanath – Drama; Umashree – Bheema Theeradalli; Malavika Avinash – Munjane	Swetha Menon – Ozhimuri; Thesni Khan – Trivandrum Lodge; Lena – Ee Adutha Kalathu; Samvrutha Sunil – Diamond Necklace; Mallika – Ozhimuri
Best Actor in a Negative Role
Tamil	Telugu
Vidyut Jamwal – Thuppakki; Narain – Mugamoodi; Sachin Khedekar – Maattrraan; Sudhanshu Pandey – Billa II; Ashutosh Rana – Vettai	Sudeep – Eega; Nassar – Dhammu; Abhimanyu Singh – Gabbar Singh; Sonu Sood – Julai; Prakash Raj – Businessman
Kannada	Malayalam
Pooja Gandhi – Dandupalya; P. Ravi Shankar– Shakti; Ravi Kale – Kalaya Tasmai Namaha; Sharath Lohitashwa – Bheema Theeradalli; Makarand Deshpande – Dandupalya	Prathap K. Pothan – 22 Female Kottayam; Murali Gopy – Ee Adutha Kaalathu; Makarand Deshpande – No. 66 Madhura Bus; Kishore – Thiruvambadi Thampan; Asif Ali – Unnam
Best Comedian
Tamil	Telugu
Thambi Ramaiah – Kumki; Santhanam – Oru Kal Oru Kannadi; Soori – Sundarapandian; Jayaram – Thuppakki; VTV Ganesh – Podaa Podi	Sreenu – Gabbar Singh; Posani Krishna Murali – Krishnam Vande Jagadgurum; Bharath – Dhenikaina Ready; Brahmanandam – Julai; Ali – Ishq
Kannada	Malayalam
Sadhu Kokila – Yaare Koogadali; Sathish Ninasam – Drama; Komal Kumar – Govindaya Namaha; Rangayana Raghu – Shiva; Tabla Nani – Rambo	Suraj Venjaramood – Mr. Marumakan; Biju Menon – Ordinary; Baburaj – Mayamohini; Salim Kumar – Ayalum Njanum Thammil; Manoj K. Jayan – Mallu Singh

=== Music ===
Best Music Director
Tamil	Telugu
Harris Jayaraj – Thuppakki; Vijay Antony – Naan; D. Imman – Kumki; Anirudh Ravichander – 3; Ilaiyaraaja – Neethane En Ponvasantham	Devi Sri Prasad – Gabbar Singh; Devi Sri Prasad – Julai; M. M. Keeravani – Eega; S. Thaman – Businessman; Mani Sharma – Racha
Kannada	Malayalam
Arjun Janya – Romeo; V. Harikrishna – Anna Bond; Gurukiran – Govindaya Namaha; A. R. Rahman – Godfather; Anoop Seelin – Sidlingu	Shaan Rahman – Thattathin Marayathu; Gopi Sundar – Ustad Hotel; Ouseppachan – Ayalum Njanum Thammil; Shahabaz Aman – Spirit; Vidyasagar – Diamond Necklace
Best Lyricist
Tamil	Telugu
Dhanush – "Kannazhaga" from 3; Na. Muthukumar – "Oru Paathi" from Thaandavam; Vairamuthu – "Para Para" from Neerparavai; Yugabharathi – "Sollitaley" from Kumki; Madhan Karky – "Aska Laska" from Nanban	Bhaskarabhatla Ravikumar – "Sir Osthara" from Businessman; Vanamali – "Amma Ani Kothaga" from Life Is Beautiful; Devi Sri Prasad – "O Madhu" from Julai; Ramajogayya Sastry – "Ga Ee Ga Ee Ga Ee" from Eega; Sirivennela Sitaramasastri – "Jaruguthunnaadi" from Krishnam Vande Jagadgurum
Kannada	Malayalam
A. P. Arjun – "Ammate" from Addhuri; Jayant Kaikini – "Yenendu Hesaridali" from Anna Bond; Pawan Wadeyar – "Pyarge Agbittaite" from Govindaya Namaha; Kaviraj – "Nee Odi Bandaga" from Shiva; Yogaraj Bhat – "Bombe Aadsonu" from Drama	Anu Elizabeth Jose – "Muthuchippi Poloru" from Thattathin Marayathu; Kaithapram – "Rajagopuram" from Puthiya Theerangal; Kavalam Narayana Panicker – "Andalonde" from Ivan Megharoopan; Sarath Vayalar – "Azhalinte" from Ayalum Njanum Thammil; Rafeeq Ahammed – "Mazha Kondu" from Spirit
Best Male Playback Singer
Tamil	Telugu
Dhanush – "Why This Kolaveri Di" from 3; Haricharan – "Ayyayayo" from Kumki; Mohit Chauhan – "Po Nee Po" from 3; Vijay – "Google Google" from Thuppakki; G. V. Prakash Kumar – "Para Para" from Neerparavai	S. Thaman – "Sir Osthara" from Businessman; Adnan Sami – "O Madhu" from Julai; Shankar Mahadevan – "Akasam Ammayaithe" from Gabbar Singh; S. P. Balasubrahmanyam – "Jaruguthunnaadi" from Krishnam Vande Jagadgurum; Vedala Hemachandra – "Oka Padam" from Racha
Kannada	Malayalam
V. Harikrishna – "Tumba Nodbedi" from Anna Bond; Tippu – "Boni Aagada" from Anna Bond; Baba Sehgal – "Nee Odi Bandaga" from Shiva; Vijay Prakash – "Thund Haikla Sahavasa" from Drama; Arjun Janya – "Mane Tanka Bare" from Rambo	Vijay Yesudas – "Mazha Kondu" from Spirit; Mohanlal – "Attumanal" from Run Baby Run; K. J. Yesudas – "Ee Chillayil" from Spirit; Vineeth Sreenivasan – "Anuragathin" from Thattathin Marayathu; Haricharan – "Mizhikalum" from Padmasree Bharat Dr. Saroj Kumar
Best Female Playback Singer
Tamil	Telugu
Saindhavi – "Uyirin Uyire" from Thaandavam; Shruti Haasan – "Kannazhaga" from 3; Shreya Ghoshal – "Solittaley" from Kumki; Shreya Ghoshal – "Vilayatta Padagotty" from Dhoni; Shreya Ghoshal – "Chinna Kanniley" from Dhoni''; Shweta Mohan – "Nee Partha Vizhigal" from 3	Geetha Madhuri – "Melikalu" from Cameraman Gangatho Rambabu; Shreya Ghoshal – "Sai Andri Nanu Sai Antira" from Krishnam Vande Jagadgurum; Mamta Sharma – "Kevvu Keka" from Gabbar Singh; Malathi – "Orinayano" from Rebel; Suchitra – "Sir Osthara" from Businessman
Kannada	Malayalam
Vani Harikrishna – "Mussanje Veleli" from Addhuri; Indu Nagaraj – "Pyarge Aagbittaite" from Govindaya Namaha; Anuradha Bhat – "Ellelo Oduva" from Sidlingu; Shreya Ghoshal – "Gamanava" from Chingari; Mamta Sharma – "Hello 123" from Yaare Koogadali	Remya Nambeesan – "Andalonde" from Ivan Megharoopan; Shweta Mohan – "Shyam Hare" from Arike; Shreya Ghoshal – "Nilave Nilave" from Chattakkari; Mamta Mohandas – "Iravil Viriyum" from Arike; Anna Katharina Valayil – "Appangalembadum" from Ustad Hotel

=== Choreography ===
Best Fight Choreographer
Tamil	Telugu
Kecha – Thuppakki; Peter Hein – Maattrraan; Manohar Varma – Thaandavam; Silva – Vettai; Anal Arasu – Thadaiyara Thaakka	Ram Lakshman – Gabbar Singh; Ram Lakshman – Dhammu; Peter Hein – Julai; Vijay – Businessman; Ram Lakshman – Rebel
Kannada	Malayalam
Ravi Verma – Krantiveera Sangolli Rayanna; Different Danny – Shakti; Thriller Manju – Lady Boss; Palaniraj – AK 56; Kaurava Venkatesh – Sankranthi	Kanal Kannan – Mallu Singh; Al Ameen – Casanovva; Anal Arasu – Bachelor Party; Kanal Kannan – The King & the Commissioner; Mafia Sasi – The Hitlist
Best Dance Choreographer
Tamil	Telugu
Gayathri Raguram – "Nila Nila" from Aravaan; Dinesh – "Vena Macha" from Oru Kal Oru Kannadi; Shobhi – "Google Google" from Thuppakki; Noble – "Ayyayyayyo" from Kumki; Brinda – "Rettai Kathire" from Maattrraan	Sekhar – "Julai" from Julai; Ganesh – "Dekho Dekho Gabbar Singh" from Gabbar Singh; Raghava Lawrence – "Orinayano" from Rebel; Dhinesh – "Dhammu Dhammu" from Dhammu; Shobi – "Vaana Vaana" from Racha
Kannada	Malayalam
Imran Sardhariya – "Tumba Nodbedi" from Anna Bond; Harsha – "Ah Ammate" from Addhuri; Murali – "Pyarge Aagbittaite" from Govindaya Namaha; Shivshankar – "Sarigama Sangamave" from Godfather; Imran Sardhariya – "Mane Tanka Baare" from Rambo	Brinda – "Aatumanal Payayil" from Run Baby Run; Dinesh – "Vijanasurabhi" from Bachelor Party; Shankar – "Appangalembadum" from Ustad Hotel; Shobi Paulraj – "Cham Cham" from Mallu Singh; Gayathri Raguram – "Pathirayo Pakalai" from Bachelor Party

== Debutant awards ==
Best Debutant Producer
Tamil	Telugu
C. V. Kumar – Attakathi; Pandiraj – Marina; Dhanush – 3; Vijay Antony – Naan; V. S. Rajkumar – Naduvula Konjam Pakkatha Kaanom	Maruthi – Ee Rojullo; Mahesh Reddy, Girish Reddy – Shirdi Sai; Korrapati Ranganatha Sai – Eega; Vikram Raju – Siva Manasulo Sruthi; Siddharth, Sasikanth Sivaji, Nirav Shah – Love Failure
Kannada	Malayalam
K. A. Suresh – Govindaya Namaha; Ananda Appugola – Krantiveera Sangolli Rayanna; Atlanta Nagendra, Sharan – Rambo; Girish Prashanth – Dandupalya; Ram Narayan – Kalpana	Siddharth Roy Kapoor, Ronnie Screwala – Grandmaster; Rajeev Nair – Ordinary; P. V. Pradeep – Diamond Necklace; Santra and Thomas Joseph – Friday; O. G. Sunil – 22 Female Kottayam
Best Debutant Director
Tamil	Telugu
Karthik Subbaraj – Pizza; S. R. Prabhakaran – Sundarapandian; Balaji Tharaneetharan – Naduvula Konjam Pakkatha Kaanom; Aishwarya R. Dhanush – 3; Balaji Mohan – Kadhalil Sodhappuvadhu Yeppadi	Maruthi – Ee Rojullo; Tanikella Bharani – Midhunam; Balaji Mohan – Love Failure; Ohmkar – Genius; Kranthi Madhav – Onamalu
Kannada	Malayalam
Pavan Wadeyar – Govindaya Namaha; Anil Kumar – Shakti; M. S. Srinath – Rambo; Jaggesh – Guru; Santhu – Alemari	Sugeeth – Ordinary; Srinath Rajendran – Second Show; Anjali Menon – Manjadikuru; P. Balachandran – Ivan Megharoopan; Lijin Jose – Friday
Best Male Debutant
Tamil	Telugu
Vikram Prabhu – Kumki; Sivakarthikeyan – Manam Kothi Paravai; Udhayanidhi Stalin – Oru Kal Oru Kannadi; Vijay Antony – Naan; Dinesh – Attakathi	Sudheer Babu – Siva Manasulo Sruthi; Rahul Ravindran – Andala Rakshasi; Naveen Chandra – Andala Rakshasi; Sumanth Ashwin – Tuneega Tuneega; Prince Cecil – Neeku Naaku Dash Dash
Kannada	Malayalam
Dhruva Sarja – Addhuri; Surya – Crazy Loka; Sharan – Rambo; Nithin – Hosa Prema Purana; Gurunandan – Cyber Yugadol Nava Yuva Madhura Prema Kavyam	Dulquer Salmaan – Second Show; Sunny Wayne – Second Show; Shankar Ramakrishnan – Spirit; Anu Mohan – Orkut Oru Ormakoot; Sekhar Menon – Da Thadiya
Best Female Debutant
Tamil	Telugu
Lakshmi Menon – Sundarapandian; Varalaxmi Sarathkumar – Podaa Podi; Manasi Parekh – Leelai; Urmila Mahanta – Vazhakku Enn 18/9; Pooja Hegde – Mugamoodi	Regina Cassandra – Siva Manasulo Sruthi; Lavanya Tripathi – Andala Rakshasi; Reshma Rathore – Ee Rojullo; Gurshagun Kaur Sachdeva – Life Is Beautiful; Monal Gajjar – Sudigadu
Kannada	Malayalam
Parul Yadav – Govindaya Namaha; Manjari Phadnis – Munjane; Rashmi Gautham – Guru; Deepika Kamaiah – Chingari; Nikesha Patel – Narasimha	Isha Talwar – Thattathin Marayathu; Namitha Pramod – Puthiya Theerangal; Gauthami Nair – Diamond Necklace; Anusree – Diamond Necklace; Shritha Sivadas – Ordinary

== Generation Next Awards ==
- Pride of South Indian Cinema – Asin
- Youth Icon of South Indian Cinema – Kajal Aggarwal
- Stylish Actress of South Indian Cinema – Shruti Haasan
- Rising Star of South Indian Cinema (female) – Nitya Menen
- Rising Star of South Indian Cinema (male) – Nivin Pauly
- Romantic Star of South Indian Cinema – Diganth
- Sensational Music Director – Anirudh
- Sensational Debut of the Year – Udhayanidhi Stalin
- Sensation Innovative Marketing – 3
