= 3rd South Indian International Movie Awards =

Indian annual film awards event

- Date: 12–13 September 2014
- Site: Malaysia Negara Stadium, Kuala Lumpur, Malaysia

Television coverage
- Network: Sun TV Network

The nominations for the 3rd South Indian International Movie Awards were announced at a press conference held at a five star hotel in Hyderabad on 17 July 2014. Actors Rana Daggubati and Shriya Saran, who are the brand ambassadors of SIIMA, were present on the occasion.

The SIIMA Awards 2014 event was held at Negara Stadium Kuala Lumpur, Malaysia on 12 and 13 September 2014. Trisha, Nivin Pauly, Silambarasan, Tamannaah Bhatia, Anirudh Ravichander, Devi Sri Prasad, Shriya Saran, Shiva Rajkumar, Lakshmi Menon, Regina Cassandra and Rakul Preet Singh performed.

== Honorary awards ==
=== Lifetime Achievement Award ===
- K. Raghavendra Rao
- K. Bhagyaraj

=== Special appreciation ===
- Chiranjeevi - Ambassador of Indian cinema
- Satyapaul Madem- youth icon of south India

== Main awards ==
=== Film ===
Best Film
Tamil	Telugu
Soodhu Kavvum – Thirukumaran Entertainment / CV Kumar; Vishwaroopam – Raaj Kamal Films International- S / Chandrahasan, Kamal Haasan, Prasad Vara Potluri; Singam II – Prince Pictures-S / Lakshman Kumar; Paradesi – B Studios / Bala; Raja Rani – A.R Murugadoss Productions, The Next Big Film, Fox Star Studios - S / Shanmugam, AR Murugadoss	Attarintiki Daredi – Reliance Entertainment & Sri Venkateswara Cine Chitra; Gunde Jaari Gallanthayyinde – Nikitha Reddy / Sresht Movies; Seethamma Vakitlo Sirimalle Chettu – Dil Raju / Sri Venkateswara Creations; Mirchi – V. Vamsi Krishna Reddy Pramod Uppalapati / UV Creations; Prema Katha Chitram – Maruthi & Sudharshan Reddy / Maruthi Media House Productions
Kannada	Malayalam
Myna – Omkar Movies / N S Rajkumar; Bachchan – Sri Venkateshwara Krupa Entertainers / Uday Mehta; Googly – Jayanna Combines / Jayanna-Bhogendra; Shravani Subramanya – Suresh Arts / K A Suresh; Bhajarangi – M Manjunath Gowda / R Nataraj Gowda	Drishyam – Ashirwad Films / Antony Perumbavoor; Amen – A whitesands Media House Production / Fareed Khan; North 24 Kaatham – E4 Entertainment / C. V. Sarathi; Annayum Rasoolum – D Cutz Film Co / K. Mohanan, Vinod Vijayan; Shutter – ABRA Films International / Saritha Ann Thomas
Best Director
Tamil	Telugu
Bala – Paradesi; Kamal Haasan – Vishwaroopam; Suseenthiran – Pandiya Naadu; Vishnuvardhan – Arrambam; Hari – Singam II	Trivikram Srinivas – Attarintiki Daredi; Koratala Siva – Mirchi; Srikanth Addala – Seethamma Vakitlo Sirimalle Chettu; Vijaykumar Konda – Gunde Jaari Gallanthayyinde; V. V. Vinayak – Naayak
Kannada	Malayalam
Pawan Wadeyar – Googly; Manju Swaraj – Shravani Subramanya; Pawan Kumar – Lucia; Nanda Kishore – Victory; Harsha – Bhajarangi	Jeethu Joseph – Drishyam; Lijo Jose Pellissery – Amen; Kamal – Celluloid; Shyamaprasad – Artist; Rosshan Andrrews – Mumbai Police
Best Cinematographer
Tamil	Telugu
Rajeev Menon – Kadal; Sanu Varghese – Vishwaroopam; Chezhian– Paradesi; Mark Koninckx – Mariyaan; Ramji– Irandam Ulagam	Prasad Murella – Attarintiki Daredi; Chota K. Naidu – Naayak; K. V. Guhan – Seethamma Vakitlo Sirimalle Chettu; Madhi – Mirchi; Amol Rathod – Iddarammayilatho
Kannada	Malayalam
Vaidy S. – Googly; Satya Hegde – Myna; Shekar Chandru – Bachchan; A. V. Krishna Kumar – Bulbul; Siddhartha Nuni – Lucia	Jomon T. John – Thira; Abinandan Ramanujam – Amen; Sujith Vasudev – Ayaal; Gireesh Gangadharan– Neelakasham Pachakadal Chuvanna Bhoomi; Venu – Celluloid

=== Acting ===
Best Actor
Tamil	Telugu
Sivakarthikeyan – Ethir Neechal; Dhanush – Mariyaan; Kamal Haasan – Vishwaroopam; Suriya – Singam II; Vishal – Pandiya Naadu	Mahesh Babu – Seethamma Vakitlo Sirimalle Chettu; Ram Charan – Naayak; Venkatesh – Seethamma Vakitlo Sirimalle Chettu; Pawan Kalyan – Attarintiki Daredi; Nitin – Gunde Jaari Gallanthayyinde; Prabhas – Mirchi
Kannada	Malayalam
Shivarajkumar – Bhajarangi; Sudeep – Bachchan; Upendra – Topiwala; Darshan – Bulbul; Yash – Googly	Dileep – Sound Thoma; Mohanlal – Drishyam; Fahadh Faasil – North 24 Kaatham; Prithviraj – Mumbai Police; Mammootty – Emmanuel
Best Actress
Tamil	Telugu
Trisha – Endrendrum Punnagai; Pooja Umashankar – Vidiyum Munn; Parvathy Thiruvothu – Mariyaan; Nayanthara – Raja Rani; Hansika Motwani – Theeya Velai Seiyyanum Kumaru	Samantha Ruth Prabhu – Attarintiki Daredi; Kajal Aggarwal – Baadshah; Tamannaah Bhatia – Tadakha; Nithya Menen – Gunde Jaari Gallanthayyinde; Shruti Haasan – Balupu
Kannada	Malayalam
Aindrita Ray – Bhajarangi; Kriti Kharbanda – Googly; Amulya – Shravani Subramanya; Radhika Pandit – Dilwala; Pranitha Subhash – Whistle	Amala Paul – Oru Indian Pranayakatha; Ann Augustine – Artist; Shobhana – Thira; Meena – Drishyam; Rima Kallingal – August Club
Best Male Debutant
Tamil	Telugu
Gautham Karthik – Kadal; Dileepan – Vathikuchi; Nivin Pauly – Neram; Naveen. S – Moodar Koodam; Ram – Thanga Meengal	Raj Tarun – Uyyala Jampala; Allu Sirish – Gouravam; Mahat Raghavendra – Backbench Student; Sree Vishnu – Prema Ishq Kaadhal; Adivi Sesh– Kiss
Kannada	Malayalam
Dhananjay– Director's Special; Arun – Gombegala Love; Niranjan Shetty – Case No.18/9; Shankar Aryan – Chitramandiradalli; Krishna – Madarangi	Krish J. Sathaar – Ladies & Gentleman; Dhyan Sreenivasan – Thira; Niranjan – Black Butterfly; Master Sanoop – Philips and the Monkey Pen; Mithun Murali – Black Butterfly
Best Female Debutant
Tamil	Telugu
Sri Divya – Varuthapadatha Valibar Sangam; Nazriya Nazim – Neram; Thulasi Nair – Kadal; Aishwarya Arjun – Pattathu Yaanai; Surabhi – Ivan Veramathiri	Avika Gor – Uyyala Jampala; Catherine Tresa – Chammak Challo; Isha Talwar– Gunde Jaari Gallanthayyinde; Priya Banerjee – Kiss; Sharmila Mandre – Kevvu Keka
Kannada	Malayalam
Parvathy Nair – Story Kathe; Akhila Kishore – Padhe Padhe; Sruthi Hariharan – Lucia; Paavana Gowda – Gombegala Love; Rachita Ram – Bulbul	Keerthi Suresh – Geethaanjali; Reenu Mathews – Emmanuel; Nyla Usha – Kunjananthante Kada; Andrea Jeremiah – Annayum Rasoolum; Aparna Gopinath– ABCD
Best Actor in a Supporting Role
Tamil	Telugu
Arya – Arrambam; Jai – Raja Rani; Bobby Simha – Soodhu Kavvum; Sathyaraj – Varuthapadatha Valibar Sangam; Bharathiraja – Pandiya Naadu	Sunil – Tadakha; Prakash Raj – Seethamma Vakitlo Sirimalle Chettu; Sathyaraj – Mirchi; Madhunandan – Gunde Jaari Gallanthayyinde; Boman Irani – Attarintiki Daredi
Kannada	Malayalam
Avinash Diwakar – Maduve Mane; Vinayak Joshi – Nam Duniya Nam Style; Arjun Sarja – Attahasa; Achyuth Kumar – Lucia; Sampath Raj – Brindavana	Murali Gopy † – Left Right Left; Indrajith Sukumaran – Left Right Left; Aju Varghese – Punyalan Agarbattis; Sunny Wayne – Neelakasham Pachakadal Chuvanna Bhoomi; Jayasurya – Mumbai Police
Best Actress in a Supporting Role
Tamil	Telugu
Nandita Swetha – Ethir Neechal; Dhansika – Paradesi; Taapsee Pannu – Arrambam; Saranya Ponvannan – Kutti Puli; Shelly Kishore – Thanga Meengal	Lakshmi Manchu – Gundello Godari; Anjali – Seethamma Vakitlo Sirimalle Chettu; Jayasudha – Seethamma Vakitlo Sirimalle Chettu; Nadhiya Moidu – Attarintiki Daredi; Andrea Jeremiah – Tadakha
Kannada	Malayalam
Parul Yadav - Bachchan; Aishwarya Nag – Loosegalu; Kalyani Raju - Jayammana Maga; Deepika Kamaiah - Auto Raja; Sindhu Lokanath - Case No. 18/9	Sanusha – Zachariayude Garbhinikal; Sajitha Madathil – Shutter; Lena – Left Right Left; Asha Sarath – Drishyam; Bindu Panicker - Pullipulikalum Aattinkuttiyum
Best Actor in a Negative Role
Tamil	Telugu
Neetu Chandra – Aadhi Bhagavan; Bobby Simha – Neram; Rahul Bose – Vishwaroopam; Arjun – Kadal; Sharath Lohitashwa – Pandiya Naadu	Sampath Raj – Mirchi; P. Ravi Shankar – Ramayya Vasthavayya; Ashutosh Rana – Tadakha; Pradeep Rawat – Naayak; Shawar Ali – Iddarammayilatho
Kannada	Malayalam
Raghav Uday – Jayammana Maga; Kishore – Attahasa; Lokesh – Bhajarangi; Ramya Krishnan – Sweety Nanna Jodi; P. Ravi Shankar – Varadhanayaka	Kalabhavan Shajon – Drishyam; Hareesh Perady – Left Right Left; Bobby Simha – Neram; Murali Gopy – Kaanchi; Joy Mathew – Amen
Best Comedian
Tamil	Telugu
Soori – Varuthapadatha Valibar Sangam; Vidyulekha – Theeya Velai Seiyyanum Kumaru; Santhanam – Theeya Velai Seiyyanum Kumaru; Senthralayan – Moodar Koodam; Sreenivasan – Kanna Laddu Thinna Aasaiya	Brahmanandam – Baadshah; Posani Krishna Murali – Naayak; Vennela Kishore – Doosukeltha; Sapthagiri – Prema Katha Chitram; Josh Ravi – Gunde Jaari Gallanthayyinde
Kannada	Malayalam
Chikkanna – Raja Huli; Sadhu Kokila – Googly; Rangayana Raghu – Jayammana Maga; Tabla Nani – Bhajarangi; Bullet Prakash – Bachchan	Sreejith Ravi – Punyalan Agarbattis; Suraj Venjaramoodu – Pullipulikalum Aattinkuttiyum; Jacob Gregory – ABCD; Sunil Sugatha – Amen; Baburaj – Honey Bee
Best Child Actor
Tamil	Telugu
Sadhana – Thanga Meengal; Prithviraj Das – Haridas; Karthick – Thalaimuraigal; Malavika – Vidiyum Munn; Sara Arjun – Chithirayil Nilachoru	Nikhil – Venkatadri Express; Sathwik Varma– Swamy Ra Ra; Shabari Mohan – Gouravam; Gaurav – Ongole Githa
Kannada	Malayalam
Ahana – Lakshmi; Sanya Iyer – Chandra; Lakshman – Teenage	Sanoop Santhosh – Philips and the Monkey Pen; Esther – Drishyam; Vivas – 3 Dots; Gouri Shankar – Immanuel; Minon – 101 Chodyangal

=== Music ===
Best Music Director
Tamil	Telugu
Anirudh Ravichander – Ethir Neechal; A. R. Rahman – Mariyaan; G. V. Prakash – Raja Rani; D. Imman – Varuthapadatha Valibar Sangam; Santhosh Narayanan – Soodhu Kavvum	Devi Sri Prasad – Attarintiki Daredi; Devi Sri Prasad – Iddarammayilatho; Mickey J. Meyer – Seethamma Vakitlo Sirimalle Chettu; S. Thaman – Naayak; Anoop Rubens – Gunde Jaari Gallanthayyinde
Kannada	Malayalam
V. Harikrishna – Bulbul; Arjun Janya – Varadhanayaka; Poornachandra Tejaswi – Lucia; Jassie Gift – Myna; Vijay Prakash – Andhar Bahar	Ouseppachan – Nadan; Bijibal – Idukki Gold; Prashant Pillai – Amen; M. Jayachandran – Kalimannu; Vidyasagar – Oru Indian Pranayakatha
Best Lyricist
Tamil	Telugu
Na. Muthukumar – "Aananda Yaazhai" from Thanga Meengal; Vairamuthu – "Nenjukkulley" from Kadal; Madhan Karky – "Osakka" from Vanakkam Chennai; Dhanush - "Boomi Enna" from Ethir Neechal; Gaana Bala - "Kaasu Panam" from Soodhu Kavvum	Ananta Sriram – "Seethamma Vakitlo" from Seethamma Vakitlo Sirimalle Chettu; Sri Mani – "Aaradugula Bullettu" from Attarintiki Daredi; Ramajogayya Sastry – "Banthi Poola Janaki" from Baadshah; Bhaskarabhatla Ravi Kumar – "Top Lesi Poddi" from Iddarammayilatho; Vanamali – "Padipoya" from DK Bose
Kannada	Malayalam
Pawan Wadeyar – "Googly" from Googly; Kaviraj – "Modala Maleyanthe" from Myna; Prof. Krishne Gowda – "Aakal Benne" from Shravani Subramanya; Dhananjay – "Pala Pala Kangala" from Whistle; Poornachandra Tejaswi – "Thinbedakkami" from Lucia	Dr. Madhu Vasudevan – "Ottaykku Padunna" from Nadan; ONV Kurup – "Lalee Lalee" from Kalimannu; Rafeeq Ahammed – "Vadakkini" from Ayaal; Prabha Varma – "Ethu Sundara" from Nadan; Santhosh Varma – "Innalakale" from Honey Bee
Best Male Playback Singer
Tamil	Telugu
Sriram Parthasarathy – "Aananda Yaazhai" from Thanga Meengal; Hariharasudhan – "Oodha Color Ribbon" from Varuthapadatha Valibar Sangam; Anirudh Ravichander – "Boomi Enna" from Ethir Neechal; Vijay Yesudas – "Chithirai Nila" from Kadal; Vijay Prakash – "Innum Konjam" from Mariyaan	Silambarasan – "Diamond Girl" from Baadshah; Haricharan – "Padipoya" from DK Bose; Anoop Rubens – "Gunde Jaari Gallanthayyinde" from Gunde Jaari Gallanthayyinde; Shankar Mahadevan – "Baapu Gaari" from Attarintiki Daredi; Daler Mehndi – "Banthi Poola Janaki" from Baadshah
Kannada	Malayalam
Arjun Janya – "Baite Baite" from Varadhanayaka; Hemanth Kumar – "Nille Nille" from Bulbul; Naveen Sajju – "Jamma Jamma" from Lucia; V. Harikrishna – "Yaakana Sigtheevo" from Sakkare; Haricharan – "Eno Eno Agide" from Googly	Vijay Yesudas – "Thirayum Theeravum" from Memories; Haricharan – "Mazhaye" from Pattam Pole; Sudeep Kumar – "Lalee Lalee" from Kalimannu; Najim Arshad – "Marivil" from Drishyam; Shankar Mahadevan – "Poonchiri" from Bicycle Thieves
Best Female Playback Singer
Tamil	Telugu
Sakthisree Gopalan – "Nenjukkulley" from Kadal; Chinmayi – "Mella Sirithai" from Kalyana Samayal Saadham; Shweta Mohan – "Innum Konjam" from Mariyaan; Saindhavi – "Yaaro Ivan" from Udhayam NH4; Remya Nambeesan – "Fi Fi" from Pandiya Naadu	K. S. Chithra – "Seethamma Vakitlo" from Seethamma Vakitlo Sirimalle Chettu; Shreya Ghoshal – "Hey Naayak" from Naayak; Suchitra – "Diamond Girl" from Baadshah; Geetha Madhuri– "Top Lesi Poddi" from Iddarammayilatho
Kannada	Malayalam
Vani Harikrishna – "Bere Yaaro" from Kaddipudi; Manjula Gururaj – "Aakal Benne" from Shravani Subramanya; Anuradha Bhat – "Sri Krishna" from Bhajarangi; Apoorva – "Googly" from Googly; Indu Nagaraj – "Oye Kalla" from Brindavana	Mridula Warrier – "Lalee Lalee" from Kalimannu; Jyotsna – "Veyil Chilla" from Zachariayude Garbhinikal; Swetha Mohan – "Kattile" from Kadhaveedu; Vaikom Vijayalakshmi – "Ottaykku Padunna" from Nadan; Preeti Pillai – "Solomonum Soshannayum" from Amen

=== Choreography ===
Best Fight Choreographer
Tamil	Telugu
Anal Arasu – Pandiya Naadu; Lee Whittaker – Vishwaroopam; Rocky Rajesh – Singam II; Rajasekar – Aadhi Bhagavan; Lee Whittaker – Arrambam	Peter Hein – Attarintiki Daredi; Kanal Kannan & Stunt Siva – Naayak; Vijay – Baadshah; Anal Arasu – Mirchi; Kecha – Iddarammayilatho
Kannada	Malayalam
Ravi Varma – Googly; Different Danny – Ambara; Thriller Manju – Lakshmi; Kourava Venkatesh – Kumbharashi; Palaniraj – Veera	Thyagarajan – Left Right Left; Al Ameen – Mumbai Police; Dhilip Subbarayan – Thira; Mafia Sasi – Daivathinte Swantham Cleetus; Run Ravi – Neram
Best Dance Choreographer
Tamil	Telugu
Shobhi – "En Fuse Pochu" from Arrambam; Brinda – "Elay Keechan" from Kadal; Birju Maharaj– "Unnai Kaanatha" from Vishwaroopam; Gayathri Raguram– "Yaar Indha Saalai" from Thalaivaa; Dinesh – "Oodha Color Ribbon" from Varuthapadatha Valibar Sangam	Jani – "Laila O Laila" from Naayak; Sekhar – "Diamond Girl" from Baadshah; Rajesh – "Top Lesi Poddi" from Iddarammayilatho; Ganesh – "Time to Party" from Attarintiki Daredi; Prem Rakshit – "Darlingeh" from Mirchi
Kannada	Malayalam
Imran Sardhariya– "Yakka Nin Magalu" from Victory; Murali – "Googly" from Googly; Murali – "Pyarge Aagbittaite" from Govindaya Namaha; Harsha. A – "Jai Bhajarangi" from Bhajarangi; Imran Sardhariya – "Tasse Otthu" from Chandra; Harsha. A - "Hello Hello" from Bachchan	Brinda – "Omanapoove" from Oru Indian Pranayakadha; Prasanna – "Orkkathe" from Ezhu Sundara Rathrikal; Sujatha – "Kizhakku Kizhakku Kunnin Meethe" from Daivathinte Swantham Cleetus; Shobi Paulraj – "Kanni Penne" from Sound Thoma; Sreejith – "Vattoli" from Amen

== Critics awards ==
Tamil Cinema

- Best Actor – Dhanush – Mariyaan
- Best Actress – Parvathy Thiruvothu – Mariyaan

Telugu cinema

- Best Actress – Tamannaah Bhatia – Tadakha

Kannada cinema

- Best Actress – Amulya – Shravani Subramanya

Malayalam cinema

- Best Actor – Prithviraj – Mumbai Police
- Best Actress – Ann Augustine – Artist

== Generation Next Awards ==
- Youth Icon of South Indian Cinema (male) – Puneeth Rajkumar
- Youth Icon of South Indian Cinema (female) – Asin Thottumkal
- Romantic Star of South Indian Cinema – Nivin Pauly
- Stylish Star of South Indian Cinema – Silambarasan
- Rising Star of South Indian Cinema (female) – Lakshmi Menon
- Sensation of South Indian Cinema (male) – Sivakarthikeyan
- Couple of the year – A. L. Vijay, Amala Paul
- Most Popular Actress in South India on Social Media – Trisha
