= Raymo =

2022 Indian Kannada-language film

- Theatrical release poster
- Directed by: Pawan Wadeyar
- Written by: Pawan Wadeyar
- Produced by: C. R. Manohar
- Starring: Ishaan; Ashika Ranganath; R. Sarathkumar
- Cinematography: Vaidy S.
- Edited by: K. M. Prakash
- Music by: Arjun Janya
- Production company: Jayaditya Films
- Release date: 25 November 2022
- Country: India
- Language: Kannada

Raymo is a 2022 Indian Kannada-language musical romantic drama film written and directed by Pawan Wadeyar, and produced by C. R. Manohar under Jayaditya Films banners. The film stars Ishaan and Ashika Ranganath in pivotal roles. The music is composed by Arjun Janya.

Raymo was released on 25 November 2022 and received positive reviews from critics.

== Plot ==
Revanth Deshpande alias Raymo is a spoilt rockstar dealing with intense family conflicts: he believes that his adopted mother is an evil gold-digger and passionately hates his father for remarrying soon after his biological mother's death. When an international music gig commands him to scout a singing talent, Raymo comes across Mohana, a dedicated classical singer who is worlds apart from Raymo. However, the two fall for one another in a manner that they complete each other and vow to stay together regardless of the hardships. However, Raymo undergo a categorical change after his father's death and learning of his step-mother's sacrifices, where he has to ignore Mohana and take over his father's business. Mohana misunderstands Raymo and gets enraged. She works hard to become a famous star like him and achieve everything Revanth has as she believes Revanth chose wealth over her love. Malathi, a PR helps her in achieving this. Soon Mohana becomes a sensational singer. Her anger and revenge on Revanth makes Mohana forget herself. She starts to drink, smoke and party late night. She even disrespects her father who had come to her with a marriage proposal for her. Mohana gets to know that the bridge which was needed in her village and for which she had come to Bangalore was constructed. She realizes that Revanth funded this project unbeknown to anybody. After rejecting the proposal to accept the Talent of the Year Award twice from Revanth's company, Mohana finally agrees to accept the award this year. On the stage she drops the award, throws a ₹4 crore cheque on Revanth's face for constructing the bridge in her village and publicly announces that Revanth and herself were lovers one time and later he broke his promise. But now Mohana says that she is ready to change into the former Mohana and marry the guy of her father's choice. Heartbroken Revanth goes to the place where Mohana first proposed Revanth on her wedding day. On the other hand, Revanth's step-mother comes to Mohana and tells her that Mohana got all her singing opportunities, rose to stardom within a short period because of Revanth. Yet he had never revealed anything to her. Mohana cancels her wedding. She finds Raymo at their favourite spot and gets cleared about her misunderstandings. They finally reunite with each other. After a few years, Revanth and Mohana have a baby girl and Mohana still gives her singing programs.

== Cast ==
As per the film's opening credits:

- Ishaan as Revanth Deshpande
- Ashika Ranganath as Mohana
- R. Sarathkumar as Sri Deshpande, Revanth's father
- Lakshmi Gopalaswamy as Mahalakshmi, Revanth's mother
- Madhoo as Bhavana, Revanth's adopted mother
- Achyuth Kumar as Mohana's father
- Rajesh Nataranga as Venkat, Revanth's P.A.
- Karunya Ram as Revanth's prospective bride (guest appearance)
- Ravi Bhat as one of the shareholders in Sri Deshpande's Company
- Divina Thakur as Baby
- Sharanya Hullur as Malathi

All Ok and Raghu Dixit, uncredited, appear as themselves.

== Soundtrack ==
No.	Title	Lyrics	Singer(s)	Length
1.	"Thareyo Koti"	Kaviraj	Sonu Nigam
2.	"Hodare Hogu"		Shreya Ghoshal
3.	"Ninnade Ninnade"		Aniruddha Sastry, Indu Nagaraj, Sanjith Hegde
4.	"Raymo Faymo"	Pradyumna Narahalli	Sanjith Hegde
5.	"Neene Ella Berenilla"		Armaan Malik
6.	"Jagadhodharana"	Shri Purandara Dasaru	Indu Nagaraj
7.	"Raymo" (Theme Music)

== Release ==
The film was released on 25 November 2022 in theatres.

== Reception ==
Sridevi S of The Times of India gave 3 out of 5 stars and wrote "Director Pavan Wadeyar has, in places, resurrected Googly. He also strikes the right chord in emotional scenes. Overall, Pavan has done a thorough job. Since this is a musical love story, Arjun Janya could have experimented a bit with the music which just sits right with the story and doesn’t stand out." OTTPlay gave 2.5 out 5 stars and wrote "Raymo, definitely has a few moments to savour but the gross silliness and lack of logic in the story, particularly in the second half, come as major disservices. If you are willing to test out what Kannada cinema has to offer this weekend, give Raymo, a chance but this review recommends that you proceed with caution."
