= 60th Filmfare Awards South =

Award show

- Date: 20 July 2013
- Hosted by: Sundeep Kishan; Chinmayi
- Produced by: Idea Cellular
- Official website: Hyderabad, Telangana India

Highlights
- Best Picture: Krantiveera Sangolli Rayanna (Kannada); Ayalum Njanum Thammil (Malayalam); Vazhakku Enn 18/9 (Tamil); Eega (Telugu)
- Most awards: Eega (five; Telugu)
- Most nominations: Kumki (eight; Tamil)

The 60th Filmfare Awards South ceremony, honouring the winners and nominees of the best of South Indian cinema in 2012, was held on 20 July 2013 at the Hyderabad International Convention Center. The Black Lady was unveiled by actress Tamannaah Bhatia at a press meet held in Chennai, on 20 June 2013. The awards were announced and distributed at Hyderabad on 20 July 2013. Sundeep Kishan and Chinmayi Sripaada were the anchors of the show, with Chinamyi hosting the Filmfare Awards for the second time.

== Main awards ==
Winners are listed first, highlighted in boldface.

=== Kannada cinema ===
Best Film	Best Director
**Krantiveera Sangolli Rayanna**; Addhuri; Drama; Edegarike; Sidlingu	**Vijaya Prasad – Sidlingu**; A. P. Arjun – Addhuri; Hari Santhosh – Alemari; Naganna – Krantiveera Sangolli Rayanna; Sumana Kittur – Edegarike
Best Actor	Best Actress
**Darshan – Krantiveera Sangolli Rayanna**; Aditya – Edegarike; Puneeth Rajkumar – Anna Bond; Yash – Drama; Yogesh – Sidlingu	**Priyamani** – **Chaarulatha**; Pooja Gandhi – Dandupalya; Pranitha Subhash – Bheema Theeradalli; Radhika Pandit – Addhuri; Ramya – Sidlingu
Best Supporting Actor	Best Supporting Actress
**Atul Kulkarni – Edegarike**; Ravi Khale – Dandupalya; Saikumar – Kalpana; Sharan – Parijatha; Shivakumar – Krantiveera Sangolli Rayanna	**Suman Ranganathan – Sidlingu**; Catherine Tresa – Godfather; Jayapradha – Krantiveera Sangolli Rayanna; Sindhu Lokanath – Drama; Umashree – Alemari
Best Music Director	Best Lyricist
**V. Harikrishna – Drama**; Arjun Janya – Alemari; Anoop Seelin – Sidlingu; Gurukiran – Govindaya Namaha; V. Harikrishna – Anna Bond	**Yogaraj Bhat – "Bombe Aadsonu" from Drama**; Jayanth Kaikini – "Yenendhu Hesaridali" from Anna Bond; Kaviraj – "Aalochane" from Romeo; Pawan Wadeyar – "Pyarge Aagbittaite" from Govindaya Namaha; V. Nagendra Prasad – "Manethanka Baare" from Rambo
Best Playback Singer – Male	Best Playback Singer – Female
**Avinash Chebbi – "Ellello Oduva Manase" from Sidlingu**; Chetan Sosca – "Pyarge Aagbittaite" from Govindaya Namaha; Fayaz Khan – "Ale Aleyo" from Alemari; Sonu Nigam – "Chendutiya Pakkadali" from Drama; V. Harikrishna – "Aa Ammate" from Addhuri	**Indu Nagaraj – "Pyarge Aagbittaite" from Govindaya Namaha**; Anuradha Bhat – "Ellello Oduva Manase" from Sidlingu; Shreya Ghoshal – "Yenendhu Hesaridali" from Anna Bond; Shreya Ghoshal – "Aalochane" from Romeo; Vani Harikrishna – "Mussanje Veleli" from Addhuri

=== Malayalam cinema ===
Best Film	Best Director
**Ayalum Njanum Thammil**; 22 Female Kottayam; Diamond Necklace; Ozhimuri; Ustad Hotel	**Lal Jose – Ayalum Njanum Thammil**; Aashiq Abu – 22 Female Kottayam; Anwar Rasheed – Ustad Hotel; Arun Aravind- Ee Adutha Kalathu; Madhupal – Ozhimuri
Best Actor	Best Actress
**Fahadh Faasil – 22 Female Kottayam**; Dulquer Salman – Ustad Hotel; Lal – Ozhimuri; Manoj K. Jayan – Ardhanari; Mohanlal – Spirit	**Rima Kallingal – 22 Female Kottayam**; Kavya Madhavan – Bavuttiyude Namathil; Mamta Mohandas – Arike; Revathy – Molly Aunty Rocks; Shweta Menon – Ozhimuri
Best Supporting Actor	Best Supporting Actress
**Biju Menon – Ordinary**; Nandu – Spirit; Pratap Pothen- Ayalum Njanum Thammil; Thilakan – Ustad Hotel; Vineeth- Bavuttiyude Namathil	**Gauthami Nair – Diamond Necklace**; KPAC Lalitha – Nidra; Mythili – Ee Adutha Kalathu; Rashmi Satheesh – 22 Female Kottayam; Samvrutha Sunil – Diamond Necklace
Best Music Director	Best Lyricist
**Vidyasagar** **– Diamond Necklace**; Gopi Sunder – Ustad Hotel; Ouseppachan – Ayalum Njanum Thammil; Shaan Rahman – Thattathin Marayathu; Shahabaz Aman – Spirit	**Rafeeq Ahmed – "Maranamethunna Nerathu" from Spirit**; Kavalam – "Andelonde Nere" from Ivan Megharoopan; O. N. V. Kurup – "Vishukkani Poothu" from Ivan Megharoopan; Rafeeq Ahmed – "Nilamalare Nilamalare" from Diamond Necklace; Rafeeq Ahmed – "Ee Chillayil" from Spirit
Best Playback Singer – Male	Best Playback Singer – Female
**Vijay Yesudas – "Mazhakondu Mathram" from Spirit**; Haricharan – "Vaathilil Aa Vaathilil" from Ustad Hotel; Nivas – "Nilamalare Nilamalare" from Diamond Necklace; Unni Menon – "Maranamethunna Nerathu" from Spirit; Vineeth Srinivasan – "Anuragathin Velayil" from Thattathin Marayathu	**Shweta Mohan – "Shyama Hare" from Arike**; K. S. Chithra – "Vishukkani Poothu" from Ivan Megharoopan; Mamta Mohandas – "Iravil Viriyum" from Arike; Remya Nambeesan – "Andelonde" from Ivan Megharoopan; Shreya Ghoshal – "Nilave Nilave" from Chattakaari

=== Tamil cinema ===
Best Film	Best Director
**Vazhakku Enn 18/9**; Kumki; Neerparavai; Sundarapandian; Kumki	**Balaji Sakthivel – Vazhakku Enn 18/9**; A. R. Murugadoss – Thuppakki; Prabu Solomon – Kumki; Seenu Ramasamy – Neerparavai; S. R. Prabhakaran – Sundarapandian
Best Actor	Best Actress
**Dhanush – 3**; Suriya – Maattrraan; Vijay – Thuppakki; Vijay Sethupathi – Pizza; Vikram – Thandavam	**Samantha Ruth Prabhu – Neethane En Ponvasantham**; Amala Paul – Kadhalil Sodhappuvadhu Yeppadi; Lakshmi Menon – Kumki; Shruti Haasan – 3; Sunaina – Neerparavai
Best Supporting Actor	Best Supporting Actress
**Thambi Ramaiah – Kumki**; Pasupathi – Aravaan; Santhanam – Oru Kal Oru Kannadi; Sathyaraj – Nanban; Vidyut Jamwal – Thuppakki	**Saranya Ponvannan – Neerparavai**; Amy Jackson – Thandavam; Nandita Das – Neerparavai; Saranya Ponvannan – Oru Kal Oru Kannadi; Vidyullekha Raman – Neethane En Ponvasantham
Best Music Director	Best Lyricist
**D. Imman – Kumki**; Anirudh Ravichander – 3; G. V. Prakash Kumar – Thandavam; Harris Jayaraj – Thuppakki; Ilayaraja – Neethane En Ponvasantham	**Yugabharathi – "Solitaley"** from **Kumki**; Na. Muthukumar – "Kaatrai Konjam" from Neethane En Ponvasantham; Madhan Karky – "Veesum" from Naan Ee; Madhan Karky – "Google Google" from Thuppakki; Vairamuthu – "Para Para" from Neerparavai
Best Playback Singer – Male	Best Playback Singer – Female
**Dhanush – "Why This Kolaveri Di"** from **3**; D. Imman – "Onnum Puriyale" from Kumki; G. V. Prakash Kumar – "Para Para" from Neerparavai; Karthik – "Katrai Konjam" from Neethane En Ponvasantham; Vijay Yesudas – "Nee Partha Vizigal" from 3	**Ramya NSK – "Satru Munbu"** from **Neethane En Ponvasantham**; Andrea Jeremiah – "Google Google" from Thuppakki; Chinmayi – "Askku Laska" from Nanban; Shreya Ghoshal – "Solitaley" from Kumki; Shruti Haasan – "Kannazhaga" from 3

=== Telugu cinema ===
Best Film	Best Director
**Eega**; Business Man; Gabbar Singh; Julayi; Rachcha	**S. S. Rajamouli – Eega**; Harish Shankar – Gabbar Singh; Puri Jagannadh – Business Man; Radhakrishna Jagarlamudi – Krishnam Vande Jagadgurum; Trivikram Srinivas – Julayi
Best Actor	Best Actress
**Pawan Kalyan – Gabbar Singh**; Allu Arjun – Julayi; Mahesh Babu – Business Man; Nagarjuna – Damarukam; Ram Charan Tej – Rachcha	**Samantha Ruth Prabhu – Eega**; Anushka Shetty – Damarukam; Hansika Motwani – Denikaina Ready; Nayantara – Krishnam Vande Jagadgurum; Tamannaah Bhatia – Rachcha
Best Supporting Actor	Best Supporting Actress
**Sudeep – Eega**; Brahmanandam – Dhenikaina Ready; Posani Krishna Murali – Krishnam Vande Jagadgurum; P. Ravi Shankar – Damarukam; Rajendra Prasad – Julayi	**Amala – Life is Beautiful**; Chinmayi Ghatrazu – Lovely; Kovai Sarala – Sudigadu; Saloni Aswani – Bodyguard
Best Music Director	Best Lyricist
**Devi Sri Prasad – Gabbar Singh**; Manisharma – Krishnam Vande Jagadgurum; Mickey J Meyer – Life is Beautiful; M. M. Keeravani – Eega; S. S. Thaman – Business Man	**Anantha Sriram** **– "Yedhi Yedhi" from Yeto Vellipoyindhi Manasu**; Jonnavittula Ramalingeswara Rao – "Shiva Shiva Shankara" from Damarukam; Sahiti Pawan – "Kevvu Keka" from Gabbar Singh; Sirivennela Sitaramasastri – "Krishnam Vande Jagadgurum" from Krishnam Vande Jagadgurum; Vanamali – "Amma Ani Kothaga" from Life is Beautiful
Best Playback Singer – Male	Best Playback Singer – Female
**Vaddepalli Srinivas** **– "Gannulanti Kannulunna" from Gabbar Singh**; Adnan Sami – "O Madhu" from Julayi; Deepu – "Nene Nani E" from Eega; Karthik – "Yevvaro" from Boduguard; S. P. Balasubrahmanyam – "Krishnam Vande Jagadgurum" from Krishnam Vande Jagadgurum	**Suchitra – "Saar Osthara" from Business Man**; Gopika Poornima – "Laali Laali" from Damarukam; Shreya Ghoshal – "Sai Andri Nanu" from Krishnam Vande Jagadgurum; Shweta Pandit – "Amara Rama" from Shirdi Sai; Sunidhi Chauhan – "Atu Itu" from Yeto Vellipoyindhi Manasu

== Technical Awards ==
Best Choreography: Jani – Dillaku Dillaku from Racha	Best Cinematography: Chota K. Naidu – Damarukam	Best Special Effects: Makuta VFX – Eega

== Special awards ==
Lifetime Achievement
- Vani Jayaram (Playback singer)
- Bapu (Director)
Best Male Debut
- Dulquer Salmaan for Ustad Hotel
- Udhayanidhi Stalin for Oru Kal Oru Kannadi
Best Female Debut
- Lakshmi Menon for Sundarapandian
- Shwetha Srivatsav for Cyber Yugadol Nava Yuva Madhura Prema Kavyam
