= Bail (film) =

- Theatrical release poster
- Directed by: Pavan Wadeyar
- Written by: Pavan Wadeyar
- Produced by: Venkat K. Narayana
- Starring: Shiva Rajkumar; Saikumar; Jayaram; Sangeetha Krish; Sanjana Anand; Yogesh; Dheekshith Shetty
- Cinematography: Vaidy S.
- Edited by: Shashank Narayan
- Music by: B. Ajaneesh Loknath
- Production company: KVN Productions
- Distributed by: KVN Productions
- Release date: 2 October 2026
- Country: India
- Language: Kannada

Bail is a 2026 Indian Kannada‑language action crime drama film written and directed by Pavan Wadeyar and produced by Venkat K. Narayana under the KVN Productions. The film stars Shiva Rajkumar in the lead, alongside an ensemble cast including Jayaram, P. Sai Kumar, Sangeetha Krish, Dheekshith Shetty, Yogesh and Sanjana Anand in key supporting roles. The film's score is by B. Ajaneesh Loknath and cinematography is by Vaidy S.

The official trailer was released on September 20, 2026, via Saregama Kannada's YouTube channel. The film was theatrically released in India on October 2, 2026, coinciding with Gandhi Jayanti. Upon release, the film received mostly positive to mixed reviews from critics who praised the performances, making and direction while criticising the screenplay.

== Plot ==
Vijay Kumar (Viji), a jovial retired police commissioner whose peaceful life and close circle are shaken after systemic legal loopholes allow violent criminals and terror suspects to walk free on bail. Driven by past demons, he turns into a quiet, calculated vigilante targeting criminals shortly after they leave custody.

== Cast ==
- Shiva Rajkumar as Vijay Kumar "Viji"
- Jayaram as Robert
- P. Sai Kumar as Ali
- Dheekshith Shetty as Daya Shankar
- Sangeetha Krish as Hasini
- Yogesh as Yogi Reddy
- Sanjana Anand
- Ramesh Bhat
- Sharath Lohithaswa
- Gopalkrishna Deshpande
- Jayaprakash
- Ramesh Indira as Sangamesh
- Rupali Sood as Kruthi
- Kiran Srinivas
- Aravind Kuplikar
- Niveditha Gowda in a special appearance
- Sadhu Kokila

== Music ==
B. Ajaneesh Loknath composed the soundtrack and background score. The lyrics were written by Pavan Wadeyar and Thrilok Thrivikrama.

Track listing
No.	Title	Lyrics	Singer(s)	Length
1.	"Cheluve Kele Cheluve"	Pavan Wadeyar	K. S. Harisankar, Harshika Devanath	3:47
2.	"Kumari Kumari"	Pavan Wadeyar	Nakash Aziz, Mangli	3:05
3.	"Shivanna Anthem"	Thrilok Thrivikrama	B. Ajaneesh Loknath, Aniruddha Shastry	4:02
4.	"Magale Magale"	Pavan Wadeyar	Vijay Yesudas	3:56

== Release and reception ==
The film was released theatrically in India on October 2, 2026, with a reported runtime of 158 minutes.

The critical response in English and Kannada media has been mixed‑to‑positive: The Times of India praised the film's premise, strong performances (particularly Shiva Rajkumar, Jayaram and Saikumar), noting some pacing issues and Shiva's pale makeup job. The New Indian Express called it “an earnest attempt with some predictable twists,” lauding the technical work and good chemistry between the lead cast. India Today rated 3 out of 5 stars and called the film to be "entertaining but lacks intelligence".

Kannada outlets such as TV9 Kannada, Eedina, and Prajavani highlighted the film's direction, performances of the senior cast, and Ajaneesh's background score and Deepaka Yaregara's cinematography; criticisms centered on screenplay trims, and portions perceived as overlong.
