= Bachchan (2013 film) =

2013 film by Shashank

- Theatrical release poster
- Directed by: Shashank
- Written by: Shashank
- Produced by: Uday K. Mehta
- Starring: Sudeepa; Parul Yadav
- Cinematography: Shekhar Chandra
- Edited by: Sri Crazymindz
- Music by: V. Harikrishna
- Production company: Sri Venkateshwara Krupa Entertainers
- Release date: 11 April 2013
- Country: India
- Language: Kannada
- Budget: ₹10.5 crore to ₹11 crore
- Box office: ₹20 crore

Bachchan is a 2013 Indian Kannada-language psychological action film written and directed by Shashank and starring Sudeepa, Parul Yadav, Jagapathi Babu, Bhavana, and Tulip Joshi in the lead roles. The musical score and soundtrack were composed by V. Harikrishna and cinematography was handled by Shekar Chandru.

Bachchan was released on 11 April 2013 in India and was also released in Dubai and other countries like Germany and Australia (Perth, Melbourne and Adelaide). The film was successful at the box office. The film was dubbed into Telugu and Hindi with the same name and in Tamil as Murattu Kaidhi in 2015. The core plot of the movie was used in the 2016 Bangladeshi film Mental.

== Plot ==
On 23 July 2011, an unidentified man carries out a series of murders, killing SI Mahesh Deshpande and Dr. Srinivas Iyengar within an hour of each other. After a tense pursuit, he is arrested by the police. The Central Bureau of Investigation (CBI) appoints Special Officer Vijay Kumar to investigate the case. During interrogation, the man reveals himself to be Bharath, a wealthy real estate businessman, and narrates the events that supposedly drove him to commit the murders.

Bharath claims that real estate tycoon Jayaraj had been exploiting the elderly Johnson couple by attempting to purchase their property for an unfairly low price. Bharath and his fiancée Anjali approach SI Deshpande for help, but Deshpande later warns Anjali, based on Bharath's horoscope, that Bharath's ambition and greed will eventually ruin their relationship. Enraged by the accusation, Bharath loses control of his temper and injures himself, after which Dr. Iyengar advises him to manage his anger and avoid sugar.

When Jayaraj forcibly takes control of the Johnsons' property, Bharath confronts him and defeats him and his associates, warning them to stay away from the family. Later, the Johnsons' granddaughter Monica returns from London to assist her grandparents but is kidnapped along with them by Jayaraj, who attempts to force them into surrendering the property. Bharath rescues them and defeats Jayaraj, but is arrested for taking the law into his own hands before Monica secures his release on bail.

Bharath later attacks Iyengar, leaving him disabled after Iyenagr repeatedly irriates Bharath about avoiding sugar. During Bharath and Anjali's engagement ceremony, Deshpande manipulates Anjali into believing that Bharath is involved with Monica by showing footage of the two selecting an engagement ring. Heartbroken, Anjali causes a gas cylinder explosion and is taken to the hospital, where she eventually dies after Iyengar refuses to treat her.

However, while investigating Bharath's account, Vijay Kumar discovers that none of these events occurred except for the murders. He learns from Anjali, Bharath's family, Anjali's family, and a psychiatrist that Bharath had been diagnosed with schizophrenia after believing Anjali died in the explosion. Bharath is admitted to NIMHANS, but escapes and abducts Jayaraj.

As Vijay Kumar continues his investigation, a CCTV recording from a separate traffic incident reveals Bharath and Anjali together shortly before the first murder, proving that Bharath's story was fabricated. Vijay Kumar realizes that Bharath had deliberately created a false narrative and pretended to be mentally ill to conceal the real motive behind the killings. He gathers both families, where Anjali reveals the truth.

Years earlier, Bharath had been in love with Anjali's elder sister Ashwini, a postgraduate student in Bellary. During her research, Ashwini discovers that illegal mining activities led by Madhusudhan and Jayaraj had contaminated a village's water supply, causing severe health problems among the residents. She encourages the villagers to report the issue to the authorities.

When Ashwini investigates the destruction of the village, she approaches SI Deshpande, only to discover that he, Dr. Iyengar, Jayaraj, and Madhusudhan are involved in the illegal mining operation. They eliminate the villagers to prevent the truth from being exposed and Ashwini is also killed. Sanyappa, a survivor of the incident, later informs Bharath about Ashwini's fate.

Devastated by Ashwini's death, Bharath, Anjali, and their families create a plan to eliminate the criminals while misleading the police through Bharath's fabricated confession. After revealing the truth, Anjali tells Vijay Kumar that Bharath has taken Jayaraj and Madhusudhan to the mining site.

Vijay Kumar arrives at the location, where Bharath eliminates both men, avenging Ashwini's death. During the confrontation, Sanyappa accidentally dies in the resulting chaos. Bharath surrenders to the police, while the media reports the deaths of Jayaraj and Madhusudhan as an accident at the mining site. Believing Bharath's actions were justified against those responsible for the tragedy, Vijay Kumar provides false testimony, helping Bharath avoid long term imprisonment.

On 11 April 2013, after two years of legal proceedings, Bharath is released from custody and reunited with his family.

== Cast ==
- Sudeepa as Bharath aka Bachchan
- Bhavana as Ashwini, Bharath's love interest
- Parul Yadav as Anjali, Ashwini's younger sister
- Jagapathi Babu as Vijay Kumar, special branch Investigation officer
- P. Ravi Shankar as Jayaraj, a land mafia crime boss
- Tulip Joshi as Monica
- Jai Jagadish as Bharath's father
- Sudha Belawadi as Bharath's mother
- Nassar as Dr. Srinivasa Iyengar
- Pradeep Rawat as Minister Madhusudhan
- Ashish Vidyarthi as Mahesh Deshpande, Circle Inspector of Police
- Ramakrishna as Ramnath (Anjali's father)
- Shruthi as Lakshmi aka Lakshmavva
- Achyuth Kumar as Sanyappa Gadigi, Lakshmi's husband
- Sadhu Kokila as Jewellery Store Staff
- Bullet Prakash as Broker Puttaswamy
- Arun Sagar as Assistant CCB Officer
- Mohan Juneja as Jayaraj's Assistant
- Daisy Shah as a bar dancer (cameo appearance in the item song "Mysore Pakkalli")

== Production ==
Initially, Aindrita Ray was approached for the lead female role. Later Bhavana was finalized as the leading lady collaborating with Sudeepa for the second time after Vishnuvardhana (2011). Jagapati Babu has been signed up to do a special appearance in film. P. Ravi Shankar, Ashish Vidyarthi, and Pradeep Rawat were roped in to play the roles of the villains. For the second lead actress role, an upcoming successful actress, Deepa Sannidhi, had been signed on first. However, on 19 June, reports came out that the actress had been ousted following a change in the script and instead, Pranitha Subhash had been reportedly roped in. The makers had been on the lookout for a suitable replacement, which they found in Hindi Cinema actress Tulip Joshi.

== Music ==
The soundtrack was composed by V. Harikrishna collaborating with Sudeepa for the third time after Kiccha Huccha (2010) and Vishnuvardhana (2011). The audio was released by D beats.

Bachchan

Soundtrack album by V. Harikrishna
- Released: April 15 2013
- Recorded: D- Beats studio, Bangalore
- Genre: Feature film soundtrack
- Length: 19:40
- Language: Kannada
- Label: D Beats
- Producer: V. Harikrishna

V. Harikrishna chronology
Bulbul (2013)	Bachchan (2013)	Kaddipudi (2013)

Official audio
- Bachchan - Full Album on YouTube

No.	Title	Singer(s)	Length
1.	"Hello Hello"	Vijay Prakash	4:20
2.	"Onchuru"	Sudeepa, Indu Nagaraj	4:19
3.	"Sadaa Ninna"	Sonu Nigam, Shreya Ghoshal	4:39
4.	"Mysore Paakalli"	Anuradha Bhat	4:01
5.	"Bachchan Theme"	Sudeepa	2:19
Total length:			19:40

== Release ==
=== Theatrical ===
The film made its theatrical release on 11 April 2013 on over 190 theatres in India. The film released in Dubai and other middle eastern countries on 18 April 2013. and also released in Germany and Australia. The Telugu dubbed version was released on 17 May 2014 in over 300 theatres.

=== Marketing ===
Actor V. Ravichandran released the teaser trailer on 31 May 2012 at Gold Finch Hotel.

=== Home media ===
The satellite and digital rights of the film were acquired by Udaya TV and Sun NXT for ₹3.33 crore (US$350,000).

== Reception ==
=== Critical response ===
Bachchan received positive reviews from critics who appreciated its technical aspects, Sudeep's performance, action sequences, direction and visual style.

Sify gave 4 out of 5 stars and wrote "Sudeep comes out on the top with his brilliant performance, both in acting and in action sequences. When it comes to action movies, it could be one of Sudeep's best". Bangalore Mirror gave 4 out of 5 stars and wrote "Shashank has shown conviction in the screenplay he created. He manages to tell a story without action being too overpowering. If you enjoy action and surprises, look no further than Bachchan. Make sure the AC is working in the theatre though". The Times of India gave 4 out of 5 stars and wrote "Sudeep has done a commendable job as Bharath. Parul impresses you with her excellent dialogue delivery and expression. Ravishankar is amazing as a villain. Music by V Harikrishna has some catchy tunes. Cinematography by Shekhar Chandra is impressive. All credit to Imran".

=== Accolades ===
Award	Category	Recipient	Result	Ref.
61st Filmfare Awards South	Best Actor	Sudeepa	Nominated	
61st Filmfare Awards South	Best Supporting Actress	Parul Yadav	Nominated	
3rd South Indian International Movie Awards	Best Film	Uday K. Mehta	Nominated	
3rd South Indian International Movie Awards	Best Actor	Sudeepa	Nominated	
3rd South Indian International Movie Awards	Best Comedian	Bullet Prakash	Nominated	
3rd South Indian International Movie Awards	Best Supporting Actress	Parul Yadav	Nominated	
3rd South Indian International Movie Awards	Best Dance Choreographer	Harsha	Nominated	
3rd South Indian International Movie Awards	Best Cinematographer	Shekar Chandru	Nominated	
