= Pattathu Yaanai =

2013 Indian film by Boopathy Pandian

- Promotional poster
- Directed by: Bhoopathy Pandian
- Written by: Bhoopathy Pandian
- Produced by: S. Michael Rayappan (Presenter); M. Sheraphin Xavier
- Starring: Vishal; Aishwarya Arjun
- Cinematography: Vaidy S
- Edited by: A. L. Ramesh
- Music by: Songs: S. Thaman; Score: Sabesh–Murali
- Production company: Global Infotainment Pvt Ltd
- Distributed by: Vishal Film Factory
- Release date: 26 July 2013
- Running time: 148 minutes
- Country: India
- Language: Tamil

Pattathu Yaanai (transl. Royal Elephant) is a 2013 Indian Tamil-language action comedy film written and directed by Boopathy Pandian and produced by Michael Rayappan.

The film stars Vishal and newcomer Aishwarya Arjun with Santhanam playing a supporting role. Music was composed by S. Thaman, and the film released on 26 July 2013. The film opened to average reviews.

== Plot ==
The story opens in Karaikudi, where Gouravam is a well-known traditional cook making a living undertaking orders for marriage functions. He is forced into taking an order for a local goon's wedding and is not happy about it. Saravanan and his four friends, who come to work for him as junior cooks, offer to help him but land him in even greater trouble and they are forced to flee from Karaikudi.

The story shifts to Trichy, where Saravanan and his friends have grand plans of opening a restaurant with the help of Gouravam and his money. Here, just like in Malaikottai, it is love at first sight for Saravanan when he sees Aishwarya. Things go wrong and as their love deepens we are introduced to two rival gangs, Kasi and Manaa along with a ‘Madurai Anachi’ who are constantly at each other's throat.

In a conflict Manaa forces Aishwarya to marry him and in the process of saving his love Saravanan reveals his past. Saravanan is a jail returnee who had killed three people in Madurai including Anachi's only son, to avenge the murder of an orphan kid whom Saravanan considered his little sister. The rest of the story is how Saravanan protects his love and defeat his foes.

== Cast ==
- Vishal as Karaikudi Saravanan
- Aishwarya Arjun as Aishwarya
- Santhanam in a dual role as
  - Gouravam (Son)
  - Poongavanam (Father)
- Chitra Lakshmanan as Inspector Rajasekar
- Mayilsamy as Jackpot
- Jagan as Ada Murugesan
- Karthik Sabesh as Pongal Kumar
- Vada Poche Sarithiran as Vada Ganesan
- Murali Sharma as Marudhamuthu
- John Vijay as Daya
- Pattimandram Raja as Rajaram
- Besant Ravi as Kada Murugan
- Raneesh
- Baby Jeyashree as Meera
- Mouli
- Subbu Panchu as Collector
- Motta Rajendran as Ambi's Cafe owner
- Singamuthu as Ambi's Cafe worker
- Ambani Shankar as Ambi's Cafe worker
- Bava Lakshmanan as Andaa
- Badava Gopi as Teacher
- Nellai Siva as Constable
- Ambani Shankar as Hotel Servant Boy
- Aditya Om as Manna
- Swaminathan as Doctor
- Muthukaalai
- Manobala
- Yogi Babu as Henchman
- Crane Manohar
- Cool Suresh as Henchman
- Rangammal as Gouravam's servant

== Production ==
Following a successful collaboration with the 2007 film Malaikottai, Vishal and Boopathy Pandian signed terms to make another film together in 2010. Boopathy Pandian subsequently moved on to make a film titled Vedi with Vikram in the lead role, but the film was cancelled after an initial schedule. In November 2010, it was reported that Pandian and Vishal would make another film under the Vishal's home banner, GK Films Corporation, in a venture titled Pattathu Yaanai and that it would feature the story that Pandian had planned for Vikram in his project Vedi. In a turn of events, the director decided to opt out of the project and do the film instead with Arya and his banner, Show People. The deal took place without the knowledge of GK Corporation who had paid him an advance, with the production house's director Shriya Reddy criticizing the director. But Arya opted out of the project. Boopathy Pandian after opting out of Telugu film Jagan Mohan IPS subsequently agreed again to make the film with Vishal and Michael Rayappan agreed to produce the film under Global Infotainment Ltd.

Reports suggested that Amala Paul was set to be signed on to play the lead female role in the film, but this proved to be untrue. Subsequently, Aishwarya Arjun, daughter of actor Arjun, was signed on to make her debut with the film. She would be portraying a Plus 2 student in the film, and was signed after being recommended by director Sundar C. Vadivelu was initially announced to be making a comeback with the film but was later replaced by Santhanam who would be seen in three roles, that of a grandfather, father and son. The film began filming in December 2012 with a lunch event at the AVM studios, with a scene shot of Vishal praying at the Muthukumaraswamy temple in the studio premises. The team shot in locations across Karaikudi, Madurai and Trichy as a part of the initial schedule with Seetha, Jagan and Manobala added to the cast. A first look poster was released on 14 April 2013 depicting Vishal and Santhanam in their respective roles.

== Soundtrack ==
Pattathu Yaanai

Soundtrack album to Pattathu Yaanai by S. Thaman
- Released: 23 June 2013
- Recorded: 2013
- Genre: Feature film soundtrack
- Language: Tamil
- Label: Sony Music India
- Producer: S. Thaman

S. Thaman chronology
Balupu (2013)	Pattathu Yaanai (2013)	Ramayya Vasthavayya (2013)

Music is composed by S. Thaman collaborating with Bhoopathy Pandian and Vishal for first time. Lyrics were written by Na. Muthukumar, Annamalai and Sarathy. The audio released on 23 June 2013 Milliblog called it "tired and sedate", India glitz wrote:" Album made with Commercial aspects in mind" while Behindwoods claimed that it "lacks freshness and fun".

No.	Song	Singers	Lyrics
1	"Enna Oru"	Karthik	Na. Muthukumar
2	"Poosani Kaai"	Gaana Bala	
3	"Raja Naandhane"	Haricharan, Udit Narayan	Sarathy
4	"Thalakaal Puriyala"	Shankar Mahadevan, Suchitra	Na. Muthukumar
5	"Thattungada Melatha"	Rahul Nambiar, M. M. Manasi	Annamalai

== Release ==
The satellite rights of the film were sold to Zee Thamizh. The film released on 26 July 2013 in 850 screens.

=== Critical reception ===
Pattathu Yaanai opened to mixed reviews from critics. S Saraswathi of Rediff said, "Pattathu Yaanai is a good and half-hearted effort by both Pandian and Krishna. The film has a purely written script and has either the music or the performances to carry it through. Only the comic elements in the film and Santhanam make it most watchable."

in.com said, "Pattathu Yaanai is not boring! Boopathy Pandian has come up with decade old story again and has stick with the formula of songs, action, sentiment and comedy. The problem is the strong script and greater strength to integrate all these commercial elements in screenplay properly. He is good at mixing humour at most expected circumstances and that’s the only thing that worked to some extent in this film with the help of Santhanam".
