= Rana Vikrama =

2015 film by Pawan Wadeyar

- Film poster
- Directed by: Pavan Wadeyar
- Written by: Pavan Wadeyar
- Produced by: Jayanna; Bhogendra
- Starring: Puneeth Rajkumar; Anjali; Adah Sharma; Girish Karnad; Rangayana Raghu; Vikram Singh
- Cinematography: Vaidy S
- Edited by: Suresh Arumugam
- Music by: V. Harikrishna
- Production company: Jayanna Combines
- Distributed by: Jayanna Combines; Reliance Entertainment
- Release date: 10 April 2015
- Running time: 147 minutes
- Country: India
- Language: Kannada

Rana Vikrama is a 2015 Indian Kannada-language masala film directed by Pavan Wadeyar and produced by Jayanna Combines. The film stars Puneeth Rajkumar, alongside Anjali, Adah Sharma, Dinesh Mangalore, Vikram Singh, Girish Karnad, Avinash, Sudha Belawadi and Mukhyamantri Chandru. The music was composed by V. Harikrishna, while the cinematography and editing were handled by Vaidy S and Suresh Arumugam.

Rana Vikrama was released on 10 April 2015 to positive reviews from critics and became a commercial success at the box office.

== Plot ==
1947: In the pre-independence era in Karnataka, one of the villagers was brought in by the police. After hearing about freedom on the radio, Louis Batten, a Viceroy of the Company, threatened the villager, saying he would never free his village, Vikramatheertha, and wanted to take all of the resources, even stating that they were his. He shoots the villager twice because of the enmity between them, thus torturing him. He also throws a sword towards him and challenges him to fight. Suddenly, the villager, who is revealed to be Rana Vikrama, wakes up, slashes, and kills him with the sword he had thrown at him.

2015: Divya, a news reporter, goes missing in a place called Vikramatheertha, which is not on the Karnataka map. She had earlier sent a letter to Home Minister K.V. Anand Rao. Learning about Divya's disappearance, Rao asks the police commissioner to send a recruit officer to investigate.

Meanwhile, Vikram, an aspiring cop, is rejected by the selection officer as he refuses to give a bribe. Vikram and his girlfriend Paaru meet Anand Rao, who assigns them to the mission. Vikram goes to Vikramatheertha in Maharashtra, witnessing an unofficial border showing Karnataka's end as well as Maharashtra's beginning, and finds out that the people are enslaved by Patil to illegally export soil to an unknown buyer. After being insulted, Vikram thrashes Patil and his henchmen, which sends Patil into a coma. Patil's brother Kulkarni, the ruling party MLA of Maharashtra, hears of Patil's coma and sends goons against Vikram, but to no avail.

Vikram organises the people to order the area and goes to change the border between the states. On the way, Vikram thrashes Kulkarni's goons right in front of Kulkarni and warns him not to interfere. Vikram reports to Anand Rao with his findings, including an Halegannada inscription, the people who speak Kannada, and also about Kulkarni. In the meantime, Vikram and the people excavate Vikramateertha and find many artefacts that they restore to their former glory, and the pictures of the artefacts are sent to Rao, who later tells Vikram that the Central government has approved the site to be developed. Vikram requests that the annexure of the site should be developed on Kannada Rajyotsava to show Karnataka its heritage.

Meanwhile, Johnson, the grandson of Louis Batten, calls Kulkarni, who is helping Johnson smuggle the soil of Vikramatheertha, to ensure everything is fine. He signs a contract for 10 billion dollars and will give Kulkarni ₹100 crore (US$11 million) in exchange for triple the soil. Rao reveals about Vikramatheertha's exploits and Vikramatheertha's belonging to Karnataka to the media, where Johnson and Kulkarni learn about the news, Kulkarni relays everything to Johnson and begs him to come to India. On the day of Kannada Rajyotsava, while Anand Rao is talking about Vikramatheertha belonging to Karnataka, Vikram's grandmother Gowri wakes up from her long inactivity, and Vikram visits her ailing grandmother, who reveals her past.

1947: Vikramatheertha was a thriving village with a famous Lord Shiva temple. Gowri, the daughter of the village chief Kusti Ranganna, falls in love with her father's student Rana Vikrama, and they get married. Meanwhile, the area is under the control of Louis Batten, who is only interested in gaining profits. One of his scientists found 100% uranium in Vikramatheertha's soil, and later got killed by him. Louis Batten and the British collaborators tell the villagers they must vacate the village, but they refuse, and Batten kills Kusti Ranganna, only for Vikram to attack him. Humiliated, Batten sends a large army force to forcibly evict or kill the villagers. The villagers fight back with stones and bare hands, but the guns and cannons of the enemy force them back. Vikrama tells Gowri and the remaining villagers to flee and return to fight the British. However, Vikram is betrayed by his partner Ashoka and is handed over to Batten. Batten tortures him mortally, but Vikram slashes the throat of Batten before his death.

2015: Johnson gruesomely bombs Vikramatheertha, causing many deaths, and the government is humiliated, as well as Vikram's grandmother's condition gets critical. Anand Rao assigns Vikram as a police officer to investigate the bombing. Vikram convinces Rao of the need to kill Johnson for the safety of the country to prevent the soil from getting into the hands of international terrorists. Vikram goes to find and kill Johnson with his squad officers, but Johnson escapes and has Vikram's team double-cross him. After dispatching the squad, Vikram arrives at the mines, where Johnson is supervising the loading of the soil and chases him along a train. Vikram fights Johnson and overpowers Kulkarni, thus saving the soil. Despite Johnson stabbing Vikram through the back, the latter brutally kills Johnson. In the aftermath, Vikram is promoted to ACP by Anand Rao.

== Cast ==
- Puneeth Rajkumar in a dual role as
  - Rana Vikrama
  - Vikram, Rana Vikrama's grandson
- Anjali as Gowri, Vikram's grandmother and Rana Vikrama's wife
- Adah Sharma as Parvathi aka Paaru, Vikram's girlfriend
- Vikram Singh in a dual role as
  - Louis Batten, Viceroy of Company Government
  - Johnson, Louis Batten's grandson
- Girish Karnad as K.V. Anand Rao, Home Minister of Karnataka.
- Dinesh Mangaluru as Kulakarni, ruling party MLA of Maharashtra
- Ashok as Vikram's father
- Sudha Belawadi as Vikram's mother
- "Mukhyamantri" Chandru as CM of Karnataka
- Avinash Yelandur as Kusti Ranganna, Gowri's father
- Harsha BM

== Production ==
It was reported in October 2013 that Pavan Wadeyar would direct Puneeth Rajkumar in this film, which was announced to be produced by Jayanna Combines. The film was officially launched, along with a teaser on 17 March 2014, coinciding with Puneeth Rajkumar's birthday. Shiva Rajkumar clapped for the first shot, while Parvathamma Rajkumar switched on the camera. According to Pavan Wadeyar, Puneeth Rajkumar will be seen as a student and a cop in this film.

Anjali, a popular Tamil-Telugu actress, returned to Kannada cinema with this film, breaking a seven-year hiatus. Adah Sharma was selected as the other heroine, after Rachita Ram opted out. Vikram Singh was roped to play as the main antagonist.

=== Filming ===
The regular shooting of the film started from 9 June 2014 in Bangalore. To shoot the key scenes of the film, a massive outdoor set was erected at Hampi on the bank of the Tungabhadra River and it is said to be one of the most expensive outdoor sets for a Kannada film. Yash visited the shooting spot at Hampi. It is the first of the film Puneeth Rajkumar, which shot at Hampi, while his father Dr. Rajkumar and brother Shiva Rajkumar had a film shot there earlier. The introduction scene of Adah Sharma was shot at MG Road metro station, thus becoming first Kannada film to shoot at Namma Metro. The major scenes were shot at Bangalore, Belagavi, Hospete, Sandur and near Donimalai. The major climax scene was canned at Jindal Factory, Bellary for 18 days. It was reported that the makers of the film had invested a whopping ₹1.25 crore in the climax. Pavan Wadeyar, in order to create a high-octane climax in the film, got a 10 kg gun especially designed for the film. The 16-member team of Ranavikrama wrapped up the last schedule of shooting in Milan, Italy in January 2015.

=== Post-production ===
The post production activities commenced during the final phase of shooting. Puneeth Rajkumar began dubbing for his role by the end of February 2015, but had to stop as the actor caught common cold and had later completed his dubbing portion. Vikram Singh completed his dubbing on 9 March 2015. Anjali completed her voice dubbing for her role on 19 March 2015. It was reported that it was her first time dubbing for a Kannada film.

== Music ==
Rana Vikrama

Soundtrack album by V. Harikrishna
- Released: 20 March 2015
- Recorded: 2015
- Genre: Film soundtrack
- Label: D Beats
- Producer: Jayanna Bhogendra
External audio
- Official Audio Jukebox on YouTube

The music was composed by V. Harikrishna in his eighth collaboration with Puneeth Rajkumar. Pawan Wadeyar, in an interview with Filmibeat, said that there are 4 songs in the film and Puneeth Rajkumar has crooned two songs, but later only one song sung by Puneeth Rajkunar was retained. Pavan Wadeyar has announced in his Twitter that the songs of the film will be released on 10 April 2015. The audio album received mixed response from audience.

No.	Title	Lyrics	Singer(s)	Length
1.	"Ranavikrama"	Pavan Wadeyar	Kunal Ganjawala
2.	"Airtelu Aircelu"	Pavan Wadeyar	Vijay Prakash
3.	"Neene Neene"	Kaviraj	Puneeth Rajkumar, Palak Muchhal
4.	"Gowri Gowri"	K. Kalyan	Karthik, Priya Himesh

== Release ==
=== Marketing ===
The film's first look was released on 17 March 2014 on the occasion of Puneeth Rajkumar's birthday in YouTube. The teaser was played in all theatres of Karnataka, irrespective of the any language film, which was being played at the centre. It was the first time that the trailer of a film was released across all theatres in Karnataka.

The second teaser was released on 12 December 2014, along with the Tamil film Lingaa. The third teaser was released on 17 March 2015, on the occasions of Puneeth Rajkumar's birthday.

=== Home media ===
The satellite and digital rights of the film were sold to Udaya TV and Sun NXT.

== Reception ==
=== Critical response ===
GS Kumar of The Times of India gave 4/5 stars and wrote "A fast-paced commercial flick which no action junkie should miss." Shyam Prasad S of Bangalore Mirror gave 3.5/5 stars and wrote "Rana Vikrama will flatter the fans of Puneeth as the actor’s image is exploited to the maximum." Veena. N of Filmibeat gave 3.5/5 stars and wrote "Rana Vikrama is high octane action entertainer. The movie is a feast for all Puneeth Rajkumar fans."

=== Box Office ===
The movie collected ₹4 crore in first 2 days. The first weekend collection was reported to be around ₹7.50 crore to ₹10 crore. The 5 days net collections were reported to be ₹8 crores.
