= Jessie (film) =

2016 film by Pawan Wadeyar

- Directed by: Pawan Wadeyar
- Written by: Pawan Wadeyar
- Screenplay by: Pawan Wadeyar
- Produced by: Kanakapura Srinivas; Srikanth
- Starring: Dhananjay; Raghu Mukherjee
- Cinematography: Arul K. Somasundaram
- Edited by: Suresh Arumugam
- Music by: Anoop Seelin
- Production company: RS Productions
- Release date: 25 March 2016
- Country: India
- Language: Kannada

Jessie (Kannada: ಜೆಸ್ಸಿ) is a 2016 Indian Kannada romantic horror film written and directed by Pawan Wadeyar and produced by Kanakapura Srinivas & Srikanth. Reported to be a triangular love story, the film stars Dhananjay, Parul Yadav, and Raghu Mukherjee in the lead roles. The music is composed by Anoop Seelin and cinematography by Arul K. Somasundaram.

The filming began in July 2015, and the first look was released on 29 June 2015. It was released on 25 March 2016.

== Cast ==
- Dhananjay as Jessie
- Parul Yadav as Nandini
- Raghu Mukherjee as Shyam Prasad
- Sumalatha as Jessie's mother
- Ramakrishna as Nandini's father
- Sudha Belawadi as Nandini's mother
- Sadhukokila
- Chikkanna
- Avinash
- Gautami as Nandini's friend

== Soundtrack ==
Jessie

Soundtrack album by Anoop Seelin
- Released: 14 February 2016
- Recorded: 2015
- Genre: Feature film soundtrack

J. Anoop Seelin has composed the music for the film. The audio was launched on the Valentine's Day of 2016 by actor Puneeth Rajkumar. Notably this was his 25th movie as music director.

No.	Title	Lyrics	Music	Performer(s)	Length
1.	"Malgudiya Ooralli"	Pavan Wadeyar	J. Anoop Seelin	J. Anoop Seelin
2.	"Male Banthu"	Pavan Wadeyar	J. Anoop Seelin	Haricharan, Samanvitha Sharma
3.	"Modala Notadallai"	Rohit Pataki	Ritu Raj	Haricharan, Samanvitha Sharma
4.	"Maaye Neenondu Maaye"	Jayanth Kaikini	J. Anoop Seelin	K. S. Chithra, Siddhartha Belamannu
5.	"Helmet"	Pavan Wadeyar	J. Anoop Seelin	Pavan Wadeyar, J. Anoop Seelin, Bengaluru Voices
