= Potugadu =

- Theatrical release poster
- Directed by: Pavan Wadeyar
- Written by: Pavan Wadeyar
- Based on: Govindaya Namaha (Kannada)
- Produced by: Sireesha Lagadapati; Sreedhar Lagadapati
- Starring: Manoj Manchu; Sakshi Chaudhary; Simran Kaur Mundi; Rachel; Anupriya Goenka
- Cinematography: Srikanth Naroj
- Edited by: M. R. Varma
- Music by: Achu Rajamani
- Production company: Ramalakshmi Cine Creations
- Release date: 14 September 2013
- Running time: 125 minutes
- Country: India
- Language: Telugu
- Box office: ₹8 crore distributors' share

Potugadu (transl. Hero) is a 2013 Indian Telugu language film written and directed by Pavan Wadeyar. It is a remake of his 2012 Kannada film Govindaya Namaha. It was produced by Sirisha and Sridhar under the Ramalakshmi Cine Creations banner. The film stars Manchu Manoj and four heroines: Sakshi Chaudhary, Simran Kaur Mundi, Rachel and Anupriya Goenka.

Achu scored the music, and two tunes from the Kannada film - including the "Pyarge Aagbittaite" - were used in the Telugu version. The shooting was wrapped up in a single extensive schedule and the post-production work was simultaneously in progress. Reportedly Potugadu was going to be the biggest movie in terms of budget in Manoj's career. The film released on 14 September 2013 and was commercially successful at the box office.

== Plot ==
Govinda Naama Sastry is a young man who decides to kill himself. He goes to a lonely spot and decides to have one last drink. At about the same time, Venkata Rathnam also comes to the same spot to kill himself. The two sit down for a chat to find out more about their respective life stories.

While Venkata Rathnam decides to die as his lover ditched him, Govinda has four love stories to narrate. First up is his romantic track with Vaidehi, the daughter of a rich Brahmin. After a brief courtship, the love story fails because Vaidehi's father is against the alliance. Govinda moves on in life and this is where the second love story begins. He falls in love with Mumtaz and romance blossoms between them. However, Govinda throws away everything in a drunken stupor, where he makes some derogatory comments about Mumtaz.

Venkata Rathnam gets furious and tries to bash Govinda. Govinda vomits blood admitting that he had poison mixed in the drink. Venkata Rathnam takes him to a hospital and gets him treated by a doctor. Mumtaz is working there as a nurse which is not known to either Govinda or Venkata Rathnam. Mumtaz hides behind a wall and starts listening to Govinda's story.

Next up is a love story with a foreigner named Stacy who is engaged to his boss. In order to steal her ring costing 500,000 rupees he separates the couple but he ditches her after he learns that she threw the ring into a river out of frustration. The last and final love story involves Mary. For the first time in his life, Govinda experiences true love. He fully reforms himself and leads a normal life. But Mary runs a brothel and traffics girls. Upon hearing this from the police, Govinda is heartbroken.

On hiring Govinda for a job, Mary tells him that her task is upbringing talented girls from towns and his job is to transport them to her house. In the present, Govinda is informed by the police regarding this and after pleading strongly, police accept Govinda's favor in helping them in releasing the girls. The girls, all of them transported by Govinda, are in a container and after much bloodshed Govinda rescues all of them. Dejected and heartbroken by the betrayal and the sins he committed he decides to die.

Govinda and Venkata Rathnam go out of the hospital and watch Vaidehi being taken to a room for her delivery and his boss along with his parents. Before suicide, Govinda tells Venkata Rathnam that he left Vaidehi as he was aware that if they eloped, her parents would have killed themselves, and that he separated his boss and Stacy as his boss would desert his parents after his marriage with her which didn't happen because of him.

Mumtaz stops Govinda as Govinda confesses to Venkata Rathnam that Mumtaz was the only girl who showered unconditional love on him and he abandoned her in a drunken state. The pair reconciles and a frustrated Venkata Rathnam leaves the hospital with the hope of gaining love. He accidentally comes across a beautiful girl who accepts his proposal.

== Cast ==
- Manchu Manoj as Govinda Naama Sastry
- Sakshi Chaudhary as Mumtaz
- Simran Kaur Mundi as Vaidehi
- Rachel Louise Wise as Stacy
- Anupriya Goenka as Mary
- Suhasini Maniratnam as Snehalatha, Govinda Namma Sastry's mother
- Sarath Babu as Panduranga Rao, Govinda Naama Sastry's father
- Posani Krishna Murali as Venkata Rathnam
- Raghu Babu as Raghu
- Sayaji Shinde as Gurajada Krishnamurthy, Mumtaz's father
- Sumithra as Lakshmi, Mumtaz's mother
- Giri Babu as Rama Chandra Murthy
- Chandra Mohan as Neelakanta Shastri
- Y. Kasi Viswanath as Gangadhar
- Geetha Singh as Jambavathi
- Satyam Rajesh as Mallesh
- Sivasankar Master as Vaidehi's dance master
- Brahmanandam as Bangaraju
- Narsing Yadav as Narasimha
- Thagubothu Ramesh as Nanda Kishore
- Srinivasa Reddy as Murthy

== Music ==
Potugadu

Soundtrack album by Achu
- Released: 25 August 2013
- Recorded: 2013
- Studio: Bengaluru, Chennai, Hyderabad
- Genre: Feature film soundtrack
- Length: 29:11
- Language: Telugu
- Label: Aditya Music
- Producer: Achu, Sunny

Achu chronology
DK Bose (2013)	Potugadu (2013)	Naa Rakumarudu (2014)

Achu composed the music for the film. The soundtrack album, officially released by Aditya Music, consists of 10 tracks, two of which was re-used from the original. "Pyar Mein Padipoya" was reused from "Pyarge Aagbittaite" and "Bindaas" from "Anthare Ivananna". The audio was launched in Hyderabad on 25 August 2013.

Track listing
No.	Title	Lyrics	Artist(s)	Length
1.	"Pyar Mein Padipoya"	Bhasha Sri	Indu Nagaraj, Manoj Manchu	04:04
2.	"Devatha"	Ramajogayya Sastry	Karthik	03:41
3.	"Bujji Pilla"	Achu, Manoj Manchu, Ramajogayya Sastry	Simbu	04:20
4.	"Super Figure"	Manoj Manchu	Geetha Madhuri, Sravana Bhargavi, Hemachandra, Rahul	03:27
5.	"Bindaas"	Ramajogayya Sastry	Tippu	03:06
6.	"Potugadu (Theme)"	Geetha Madhuri, Manoj Manchu	Geetha Madhuri, Achu	01:23
7.	"Love (Theme)"		Achu	02:09
8.	"Sloka (Theme)"		Parnika, Sahithi, Ramya, Deepthi Chari, Deepu, Krishna Chaitanya, Anudeep Dev, Rahul	01:41
9.	"Action The Distraction"		Achu	02:06
10.	"Potugadu (Mashup)"		Achu	03:14
Total length:				29:11

== Release ==
Potugadu was awarded an 'A' certificate by the censor board, which recommended a few cuts to the movie.

The film released in 550 screens worldwide.

== Critical reception ==
The film opened to mixed reviews from critics. Rediff.com gave the film 2/5 and stated, "The film may appeal to those who enjoy double entendres and crude entertainment. Others can happily give it a miss." Deccan Chronicle rated the film 1.5/5 and called it a waste of time.

== Box office ==
The film opened with 45% - 60% occupancy on the first day. The film became the biggest hit ever in Manoj's career.
