= SIIMA Lifetime Achievement Award =

South Indian film award

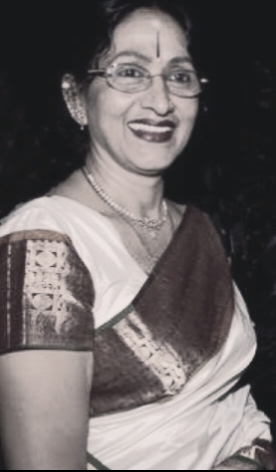
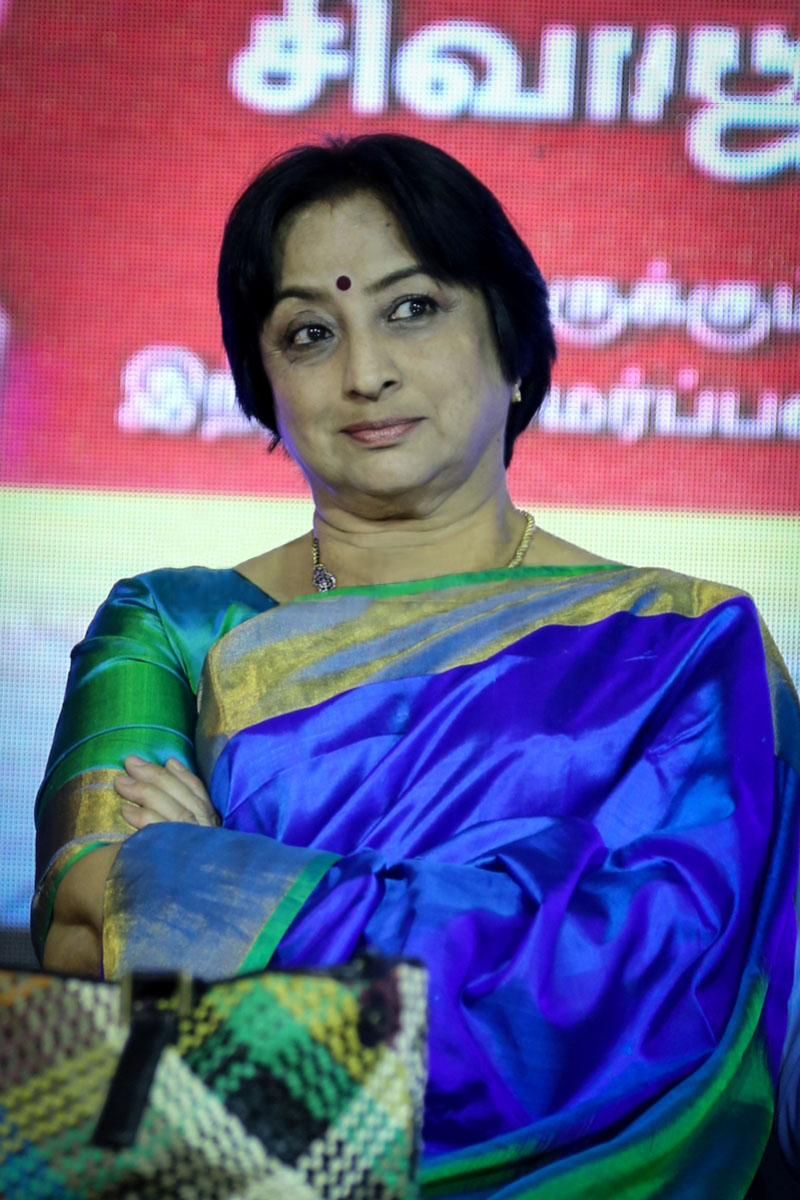
- The 2026 recipients: Bharathi Vishnuvardhan and Lakshmi
- Country: India
- Presented by: Vibri Media Group
- First award: 21 June 2012
- Currently held by: Bharathi Vishnuvardhan and Lakshmi

SIIMA Lifetime Achievement Award is an award presented by Vibri media group as part of its annual South Indian International Movie Awards for the person who contributed much to the film industry. It was instituted in 2012, with Ambareesh being the first recipient.

== Recipients ==
Year	Photo	Recipient	Profession	Ref
2011		Ambareesh	Actor	
2012		K. J. Yesudas	Singer	
2012		Sowcar Janaki	Actor	
2013		K. Raghavendra Rao	Director	
2013		K. Bhagyaraj	Director	
2014		Bharathiraja	Director	
2014		K. P. A. C. Lalitha	Actor	
2015		S. Janaki	Singer	
2015	—	Panchu Arunachalam	Writer, Lyricist	
2016		Murali Mohan	Actor, producer	
2016		S. P. Balasubrahmanyam	Singer, actor	
2017		P. Susheela	Singer	
2018		Menaka	Actor	
2018	—	Suresh Kumar	Actor	
2019–2020		Sheela	Actor	
2019–2020		K. Viswanath	Director, actor	
2021	No award			
2022	No award			
2023		Vijayakanth	Actor, producer	
2024		Sivakumar	Actor	
2025		Bharathi Vishnuvardhan	Actress	
2025		Lakshmi	Actress	
