= Natasaarvabhowma =

2019 Kannada action film

- Theatrical release poster
- Directed by: Pavan Wadeyar
- Screenplay by: Pavan Wadeyar
- Story by: Janardhana Maharshi
- Produced by: Rockline Venkatesh
- Starring: Puneeth Rajkumar; Anupama Parameswaran; Rachita Ram; Chikkanna; P. Ravi Shankar
- Cinematography: Vaidy S
- Edited by: Mahesh S. Reddy
- Music by: D. Imman
- Production company: Rockline Entertainments Pvt Ltd
- Distributed by: Rockline Entertainments Pvt Ltd
- Release date: 7 February 2019
- Running time: 157 minutes
- Country: India
- Language: Kannada
- Box office: ₹28 crore

Natasaarvabhowma (transl. Emperor of Actors) is a 2019 Indian Kannada-language action comedy film directed by Pavan Wadeyar and produced by Rockline Venkatesh. The film stars Puneeth Rajkumar, Anupama Parameswaran (in her Kannada debut) and Rachita Ram, alongside P. Ravi Shankar, Prabhakar, Prakash Belawadi, Chikkanna, Sadhu Kokila, Achyuth Kumar and Avinash, with B. Saroja Devi in her last silver screen appearance. The music was composed by D. Imman, while cinematography and editing were handled by Vaidy S and Mahesh S. Reddy.

Natasaarvabhowma was released on 7 February 2019 to mixed-to-positive reviews from critics and became a commercial success at the box office.

== Plot ==
In Bangalore, Central Minister Ghanshyam Yadav is intercepted by some goons but is rescued by Gagan Dixit, a news reporter returning from Kolkata. Gagan investigates the attack and realizes that the fight was a staged act by Yadav to gain sympathy votes in the elections. Gagan reports to Avinash, the newspaper editor, and publishes this story anonymously, leaving Yadav infuriated.

Gagan meets up with his best friend Keshava and decides to rent a haunted house owned by Namadev, despite Keshav's objections. Gagan convinces Keshav that since he has a sacred thread on his right wrist, they will be fine. Gagan unsuccessfully tries to call the phone number of someone, and they leave for the mobile network's office to obtain the location of the number. They meet with Sakshi, the manager, who refuses to give it. After the story about the fake fight is published, the newspaper loses many ads and Avinash sends Gagan to do a special write-up on Yadav by interviewing him in his private jet. After a fairly tense interview, the jet lands in Bellary and Yadav is ambushed. Gagan initially believes it to be another fake fight for sympathy votes, but realizes that Yadav is bleeding unlike in the last fight.

Gagan saves Yadav, putting himself in Yadav's good graces. Gagan had previously rescued Sakshi from goons in her office and she had agreed to share the location. When Gagan visits her, she refuses again as Namadev has told her that it was a setup by Gagan and Keshava to get the location of the number. Gagan goes to Sakshi's office again but learns that her father suffered from a stroke, causing Sakshi to faint. Gagan and Yadav manage to rescue Sakshi and her father just in time. Due to this, Sakshi falls in love with Gagan and agrees to give details about the phone number. After various paranormal activities in the house, Keshav quarrels with Namadev.

Gagan tries to break up the fight and consequently loses his sacred thread. Gagan starts experiencing supernatural activities in the house, where he finds some spectacles in a drawer and wears them and his behaviour changes. Gagan goes to interview the famous veteran actress B. Saroja Devi at a country club, where he notices his vision blurring and wears the spectacles to regain focus. Gagan shifts his focus to Prabhakar Reddy, a lawyer, in the pool and relentlessly thrashes Prabhakar, occasionally asking him "Why did you kill me?". Prabhakar escapes and Gagan loses consciousness.

Gagan and Keshav attend Yadav's birthday bash, where they get drunk. Yadav embraces him and Gagan wears the spectacles to regain focus. Gagan proceeds to thrash Yadav mercilessly. Yadav survives and Gagan wakes up in prison, with no idea about the happenings. Gagan gets bail on the case of mental illness and the media quickly picks up Gagan's story, focusing that he lives in a supposedly haunted house. An observer explains the suicide of his niece Shruthi, which occurred in that house. Sakshi reveals to Gagan that the location of the number is the same house. Gagan is shocked and reveals the person to be his girlfriend Shruthi.

Past: Shruthi, who works under Prabhakar as a junior lawyer, arrives in Kolkata and befriends Gagan after reading the article, he wrote on disabled persons. They both prepared articles to file a case against Yadav, who was supplying duplicate products to disabled persons. Gagan proposes to Shruthi and asks her to call him after she reaches Bangalore for her answer, but he does not receive a call from Shruthi and Gagan arrives in Bangalore to find Shruti.

Present: Gagan is taken to the ashram of Yadav's mentor Guruji instead of a mental hospital, where a ritual is being performed to get rid of the spirit that has invaded Gagan. Gagan wears the spectacles again, which are revealed to be Shruti's spectacles, revealing that Shruti is the spirit. Gagan violently kills Reddy, before moving to Yadav. Yadav holds Shruthi's uncle as a hostage before someone delivers a final blow. In the court, Guruji reveals that he has seen the violent nature of the spirit, while the doctors divulge that Gagan is suffering from MPD. The court orders Gagan to be sent to a mental asylum.

Flashback: In the ashram, Gagan kills Shruthi's uncle before violently killing Yadav. Gagan reveals to Guruji that he was never possessed by anyone and reveals that he planned to avenge Shruti's death. Gagan reveals that he had a video chat with Shruthi and had witnessed Yadav, Reddy and her uncle killing Shruti and making it look like a suicide. Gagan explains that he would be proven spiritually and scientifically innocent and forces Guruji to lie in front of the media.

Present: Gagan is in a mental asylum van and sees Guruji in a car. Guruji looks at him without blinking his eyes. When Guruji leaves, Gagan smiles.

== Cast ==
- Puneeth Rajkumar as Gagan Dixit
- Anupama Parameswaran as Shruti, a junior lawyer
- Rachita Ram as Sakshi
- P. Ravi Shankar as Central Minister Ghanashyam Yadhav
- Chikkanna as Keshava, Gagan's friend
- Sadhu Kokila as Namadev, Gagan and Keshava's house owner
- Prakash Belawadi as Shruthi's uncle
- Achyuth Kumar as Yadhav's Guruji
- Srinivasa Murthy as Dixit, Gagan's father
- Avinash as Avinash, Gagan's boss
- Prabhakar as Prabhakar, a lawyer
- Pradeep Doddaiah as a news anchor

=== Cameo appearance ===
- B. Saroja Devi as herself
- Jani Master in the song "Open the Bottle"
- Rockline Venkatesh in the song "Natasaarvabhouma"
- Bhushan in the song "Natasaarvabhouma"
- Avika Gor in the song "Taaja Samachara"

== Production ==
=== Filming ===
The main scenes between Puneeth Rajkumar and Anupama Parameshwaran were shot in Kolkata, along with a romantic song "Tajaa Samachara". The shooting schedule in Kolkata was wrapped up in September 2018.

== Music ==
Natasaarvabhowma

Soundtrack album by D. Imman
- Released: 9 January 2019
- Genre: Soundtrack
- Length: 27:35
- Language: Kannada
- Label: Lahari Music
- Producer: D. Imman

D. Imman chronology
Viswasam (2019)	Natasaarvabhowma (2019)	Kennedy Club (2019)
External audio
- Official Audio Jukebox on YouTube

The soundtrack was composed by D. Imman and the audio launch was held on 12 January 2019 in Hubli. Following Puneeth Rajkumar's death in 2021, a tribute track penned by Pawan Wadeyar, which was the original concept for the introduction song for Natasaarvabhowma, was added to the soundtrack on 17 March 2022.

No.	Title	Lyrics	Singer(s)	Length
1.	"Open The Bottle"	Yograj Bhat	Vijay Prakash	05:15
2.	"Natasaarvabhowma Title Track"	Pawan Wadeyar	Sanjith Hegde, Anthony Daasan, Jithin Raj	04:45
3.	"Yaaro Naanu"	Kaviraj	Shreya Ghoshal Sonu Nigam	04:25
4.	"Tajaa Samachara – Male Medley"	Jayanth Kaykini	Jithin Raj	04:50
5.	"Tajaa Samachara – Female Medley"	Jayanth Kaykini	Vandana Srinivasan	04:50
6.	"Panoramal Action – Theme Music"		Instrumental	02:35
7.	"Power Play – Theme Music"		Instrumental	00:55
8.	"Open the Bottle - Karoake"		Instrumental	05:15
9.	"Natasaarvabhowma Title Track - Karoake"		Instrumental	04:45
10.	"Yaaro Naanu - Karaoke"		Instrumental	04:25
11.	"Taaja Samachara - Karaoke"		Instrumental	04:50
12.	"Dance With Appu - A Tribute to Puneeth Rajkumar (Powerism)"	Pawan Wadeyar	Jithin Raj, Shree Harsha	05:05

== Release ==
The film was released on 7 February 2019.

=== Home media ===
The digital streaming rights was sold to ZEE5.

== Reception ==
Natasaarvabhowma received mixed-to-positive reviews from critics.

=== Critical response ===
Aravind Shwetha of The News Minute gave 4/5 stars and wrote "A movie tailor-made for Puneeth’s fans and is paisa-vasool throughout!." A. Sharaadha of Cinema Express gave 3.5/5 stars and wrote "Natasaarvabhowma is Puneeth's show out-and-out. He not only gets out of his regular formulaic characters with this film, but also makes sure he provides all the entertainment his die-hard fans usually look forward to from him." Sunayana Suresh of The Times of India gave 3/5 stars and wrote "Watch this film if you want a film that has the commercial elements in place, but also has a little twist. Whether the twist is edgy and risque enough, that is another debate." Manoj Kumar R of The New Indian Express gave 2/5 stars and wrote "Pawan Wadeyar has mashed the themes of horror-comedy, revenge and a few dance numbers to serve a masala film that offers nothing new."

=== Box office ===
Natasaarvabhowma had a record 1,394 shows on the first day in Karnataka. The movie was reported to have grossed ₹28 crores in 6 days.

== Accolades ==
Award	Category	Recipient	Result	Ref
9th South Indian International Movie Awards	Best Film	Rockline Productions	Nominated	
9th South Indian International Movie Awards	Best Director	Pavan Wadeyar	Nominated	
9th South Indian International Movie Awards	Best Actor	Puneeth Rajkumar	Nominated	
9th South Indian International Movie Awards	Best Actress	Anupama Parameswaran	Nominated	
9th South Indian International Movie Awards	Best Actor in Negative Role	P. Ravi Shankar	Nominated	
9th South Indian International Movie Awards	Best Comedian	Chikkanna	Nominated	
9th South Indian International Movie Awards	Best Music Director	D. Imman	Nominated	
9th South Indian International Movie Awards	Best Lyrics	Pavan Wadeyar "Natasaarvabhowma Title Song"	Won	
9th South Indian International Movie Awards	Best Male Playback Singer		Pending	
