= Vaidy S. =

Indian cinematographer

- Born: Vaidy Somasundaram; Tamil Nadu, India
- Other name: Vaidy S. Pillai
- Education: M.G.R. Government Film and Television Training Institute, Chennai
- Occupation: Cinematographer
- Years active: 2004 – present
- Website: http://vaidys.com/

Vaidy Somasundaram, also known as Vaidy S., is an Indian cinematographer, who primarily works in the Tamil, Kannada and Malayalam film industries.

== Early life and career ==
After graduating with a gold medal in film technology and cinematography from the M.G.R. Government Film and Television Training Institute, Chennai, he debuted as a cinematographer in the Malayalam movie Kanne Madanguka. Then he worked with director A. K. Lohithadas in the movie Kasthuri Maan. Later he joined with the film director Boopathy Pandian in the movie Thiruvilaiyaadal Aarambam, a box office success. He also worked with Boopathy Pandian in the movies Malaikottai and Pattathu Yaanai.

He is known for his work in movies such as Googly and Rana Vikrama with Pavan Wadeeyar. For Googly, he won a SIIMA Award for Best Kannada Cinematographer.

Vaidy teamed up with Santhosh Ananddram’s directorial debut Mr. and Mrs. Ramachari, which he won SIIMA Award for Best Kannada Cinematographer for the second consecutive year.

His notable works with the director P. C. Shekar are Romeo and Raaga.

== Filmography ==
Year	Movie	Language
2004	Kanne Madanguka	Malayalam
2005	Kadhale En Kadhale	Tamil
2005	Kasthuri Maan	Tamil
2006	Thiruvilayadal Aarambam	Tamil
2007	Marudhamalai	Tamil
2007	Malaikottai	Tamil
2008	Muniyandi Vilangial Moonramandu	Tamil
2009	Kuthirai	Tamil
2010	Kacheri Arambam	Tamil
2011	Vaadamalli	Malayalam
2012	Njanum Ente Familiyum	Malayalam
2012	Romeo	Kannada
2012	Manthrikan	Malayalam
2013	Googly	Kannada
2013	Pattathu Yaanai	Tamil
2014	Mr. and Mrs. Ramachari	Kannada
2015	Rana Vikrama	Kannada
2015	Chirakodinja Kinavukal	Malayalam
2015	Masterpiece	Kannada
2017	Raaga	Kannada
2019	Natasaarvabhowma	Kannada
2020	One	Malayalam
2022	Raymo	Kannada
2026	Bail	Kannada

== Awards ==
3rd South Indian International Movie Awards

- Best Cinematographer Kannada for Googly

4th South Indian International Movie Awards

- Best Cinematographer Kannada for Mr. and Mrs. Ramachari

== Sources ==
- "Review of Mr and Mrs Ramachari". The Times of India. 25 December 2014.
