= Pavan Wadeyar =

Indian film director and producer

- Born: 10 December 1987 (age 38); Kunigal, Tumakuru, Karnataka, India
- Occupations: Film director; actor
- Years active: 2010–present
- Spouse: Apeksha Purohit (m. 2018)
- Children: 2

Pavan Wadeyar (born 10 December 1987) is an Indian film director, screenwriter, lyricist, actor and producer best known for his work in Kannada cinema. He is known for writing and directing Govindaya Namaha (2012), for which he won the SIIMA award for the Best Debut Director. Being Producer, his film Dollu won the National Film Award for Best Kannada Feature Film at the 68th National Film Awards (2022).

== Career ==
Wadeyar began his career by working as an assistant director to Yogaraj Bhat in Pancharangi (2010). He made his directional debut with Govindaya Namaha (2012) that went to become a successful film. He won the SIIMA award for the Best Debut Director. He later remade the film in Telugu as Potugadu (2013).

Wadeyar's Googly starring Yash and Kriti Kharbanda was a major success. Wadeyar made his acting debut in 2014 film Preethi Geethi Ityaadi directed by Veerendra. He worked as a writer for Kwatle Satisha (2014). In 2015, he directed Rana Vikrama starring Puneeth Rajkumar which became blockbuster hit. In 2016 Pavan directed Jessie and Nataraja Service.

In 2021, Wadeyar produced Dollu, a film tracing the origins of Dollu Kunitha directed by Sagar Puranik. The film won the Best Feature Film in Kannada at the 68th National Film Awards in 2023. In the same year, it was reported that Wadeyar was directing a Hindi film titled Awasthi Vs Awasthi.

In 2026, Wadeyar directed the crime drama, Bail, starring Shiva Rajkumar in the lead role, and produced by KVN Productions.

== Personal life ==
Wadeyar was born on 10 December 1987 to Geetha and Gajanana Wadeyar in Kunigal, Karnataka. In recent Facebook live he told that he basically hails from Athani Taluk, Belagavi district. He has an elder sister called Ashwini Madhusudhan. He is a Bachelor of Commerce graduate with distinction. He worked at Fidelity company in Bangalore for 8 months due to his passion towards cinema he resigned his job and entered film industry. In December 2017, Wadeyar got engaged to actress and fashion designer Apeksha Purohit. They married in August 2018 and are parents to two children.

== Filmography ==
- Note: All films are in Kannada, unless otherwise noted.

=== As director, writer and actor ===
Year	Title	Credited as			Notes
Year	Title	Director	Writer	Actor	Notes
2012	Govindaya Namaha	Yes	Yes		
2013	Potugadu	Yes	Yes	Yes	Telugu remake of Govindaya Namaha; Cameo appearance
2013	Googly	Yes	Yes	Yes	Cameo appearance in the song "Yeno Yeno Aagide"
2014	Preethi Geethi Ityaadi			Yes	
2015	Rana Vikrama	Yes	Yes	Yes	Cameo appearance
2016	Jessie	Yes	Yes		
2016	Nataraja Service	Yes	Yes		
2019	Natasaarvabhowma	Yes	Yes		Also choreographer
2022	Raymo	Yes	Yes		
2026	Bail	Yes	Yes		

=== As producer ===
Year	Title	Notes
2021	Dollu	

=== As lyricist ===
Year	Film	Song(s)	Notes
2012	Govindaya Namaha	"Anthare Ivananna", "Pyarge Aagbittaite"	
2013	Googly	"Gandu Janma", "Googly Gandasare Keli", "Googly Googly"	
2015	Rana Vikrama	"Ranavikrama", "Airtelu Aircelu"	
2016	Jessie	"Malgudiya Ooralli", " Male Banthu", "Helmet"	
2016	Nataraja Service	"Allah Allah", "Nataraja Service", "Jilka Jilka"	
2017	Pushpaka Vimana	"Jilka Jilka"	
2019	Natasaarvabhowma	"Natasaarvabhowma Title Track", "Dance With Appu - A Tribute to Puneeth Rajkumar (Powerism)"	

== Awards and nominations ==
Film	Award	Category	Result	Ref.
Govindaya Namaha	2nd South Indian International Movie Awards	Best Debutant Director	Won	
Govindaya Namaha	2nd South Indian International Movie Awards	Best Lyricist for "Pyarge Agbittaite"	Nominated	
Govindaya Namaha	Radio Mirchi Awards	Upcoming Lyricist	Won	
Govindaya Namaha	60th Filmfare Awards South	Best Lyricist for "Pyarge Aagbittaite"	Nominated	
Googly	3rd South Indian International Movie Awards	Best Director	Won	
Googly	3rd South Indian International Movie Awards	Best Lyricist for "Googly"	Won	
Rana Vikrama	63rd Filmfare Awards South	Best Director	Nominated	
Rana Vikrama	63rd Filmfare Awards South	Best Lyricist for "Jagave Ondu Ranaranga"	Nominated	
Rana Vikrama	5th SIIMA Awards	Best Director	Nominated	
Jessie	6th SIIMA Awards	Best Director	Nominated	
Natasaarvabhowma	10th South Indian International Movie Awards	Best Director	Nominated	
Natasaarvabhowma	10th South Indian International Movie Awards	Best Lyricist for "Natasaarvabhowma"	Won	
