= Googly (2013 film) =

2013 Indian film by Pavan Wadeyar

- Theatrical release poster
- Directed by: Pavan Wadeyar
- Written by: Pawan Wadeyar
- Produced by: Jayanna; Bhogendra
- Starring: Yash; Kriti Kharbanda
- Cinematography: Vaidy S
- Edited by: Sanath Kumar; Suresh Arumugam
- Music by: Songs : Joshua Sridhar; Background Score : Anoop Seelin
- Production company: Jayanna Combines
- Distributed by: Sadashiva M G
- Release date: 19 July 2013
- Country: India
- Language: Kannada
- Budget: ₹4 crore
- Box office: ₹15 crore

Googly is a 2013 Indian Kannada language romantic comedy film directed by Pavan Wadeyar and produced by Jayanna Combines, starring Yash and Kriti Kharbanda in the lead roles, while Ananth Nag, Sudha Belawadi, Deepu, Ashok Sharma, Neenasam Ashwath and Sadhu Kokila appear in supporting roles.

Googly was released on 19 July 2013 to positive reviews from critics and became a commercial success. The film won multiple nominations at the 3rd South Indian International Movie Awards. Having been nominated in 11 categories, the film won SIIMA awards for Best Director (Pavan Wadeyar), Best Cinematographer (Vaidy S.), Best Lyricist (Pavan Wadeyar) and Best Fight Choreographer (Ravi Varma). The copyrights for the Bengali remake were sold to Eskay Movies.

== Plot ==
Sharath is admitted to the hospital after being attacked by a group of rowdies and is taken special care by the doctors as he is a rich industrialist. He was with Swathi who is revealed to be his friend to the journalist who helped them to reach to hospital. Swathi donates her blood to Sharath and the movie shifts to flashback.Swathi was a MBBS student from Mysore who came to Bangalore to attend the 'Global Economy Forum' which is taking place in the college where Sharath is an MBA student. On the first day she met Sharath and was surprised as he was hated by his whole college even though he is a first ranker. She has an interest in him when her roommate refers to him as a 'mental' and has strong hate towards girls and love. On the event of the forum Sharath fell asleep when he was called out for the presentation and Swathi woke him up. He gave a hilarious speech and was selected for the next round while Swathi was also selected. Sharath is disturbed by the thoughts of Swathi while sleeping and is afraid of being in love as he hates it.So he decided to say thank you to her for yesterday's incident and to get rid of her thoughts. While swathi was finding a reason to talk with this interesting man. They both met and talked to each other, where Swathi realizes he considers love to be futile and girls are all for money.Sharath is a straightforward, difficult, intelligent guy. By this meet, both of them started to love each other. Over a period of time, Sharath starts to suspect every act of Swathi.

One day, Swathi is injured and things become more complicated when he misunderstands Swathi's friend to be her boyfriend at a hospital where she is undergoing treatment. As a result, Sharath gets annoyed and slaps Swathi. Unlike any guy who'll normally brood over his past girlfriend, Sharath takes this as a challenge and devotes his time to his career, and becomes a huge entrepreneur within a couple of years. After a few years, Sharath realises his mistake of hurting Swathi and tries to reconcile with her by apologizing to her through a phone call on her birthday, but is hurt to hear that Swathi is getting engaged to someone and she never had such feelings for him. Later, he returns to India to attend his friend's wedding in Mangalore, and is surprised to see Swathi and he learns that they both will attend the same wedding.

Upon further conversation with Swathi, he discovers that Swathi had lied to him regarding her engagement to get rid of him, because she didn't have the strength to be heartbroken again if Sharath would leave her for the second time. Thus, he win her heart again. Swathi later decides to reunite with him and they fall in love again, but on their way, a North Indian gang, who were thrashed by Sharath for separating two lovers, attacks him. After admitting Sharath in the hospital, Swathi donates her blood to Sharath where Sharath's mother scolds Swathi and she leaves without informing anyone. Sharath manages to find her at train station with the support of the media. When she replies she had lost her accessories and ticket in the station, where Sharath tells her that in spite of going through so much pain to find her she is lamenting the loss of something trivial. They reconcile with each other.

== Cast ==
- Yash as Sharath, an international businessman
- Kriti Kharbanda as Dr. Swathi, Sharath's love interest and a doctor
- Anant Nag as Sharath's father
- Sudha Belawadi as Kousalya, Sharath's mother
- Sadhu Kokila as Musthafa
- Neenasam Ashwath as Ravi Joshi
- Deepu as Madhu, Swathi's friend
- Ashok Sharma as Narayana, Sharath's friend
- M. N. Lakshmi Devi
- Gopal Krushna Raul as Sharath's friend
- Pavan Wadeyar in special appearance in "Yeno Yeno Aagide"
- Saurav Lokesh as a local goon

== Production ==
Yash was cast to play Sharath, an eccentric university student. Kriti Kharbanda was cast as a sincere medical student Swathi. The film marked their first film collaboration.

Palaniraj and Ravi Varma choreographed the action sequences, while the dance choreography were handled by Murali. Joshua Sridhar composed the soundtrack while ace Kannada music composer and state awardee Anoop Seelin composed the background score. Filming took place in Bangalore and Mangalore with the climax scene shot at the railway station at Sakleshpura in Hassan district.

== Soundtrack ==
Googly

Soundtrack album by Joshua Sridhar
- Released: 3 June 2013
- Genre: Feature film soundtrack
- Length: 25:42
- Label: D Beats
- Producer: V. Harikrishna

The soundtrack music for the film was composed by Joshua Sridhar and the background music for the film was scored by Anoop Seelin. The lyrics for the soundtracks were penned by Jayant Kaikini, Yogaraj Bhat, Kaviraj and Pavan Wadeyar. The album consisting of six soundtracks was released on 3 June 2013, in Bangalore.

Track list
No.	Title	Lyrics	Singer(s)	Length
1.	"Gandu Janma"	Pavan Wadeyar	Pavan Wadeyar	4:21
2.	"Yeno Yeno Aagide"	Kaviraj	Haricharan	4:52
3.	"Neenirade"	Jayant Kaikini	Sonu Nigam	4:24
4.	"Googly Gandasare Keli"	Pavan Wadeyar	Haricharan, Apoorva Shridhar	4:15
5.	"Bisilu Kudureyondu"	Yogaraj Bhat	Rajesh Krishnan	3:22
6.	"Googly Googly"	Pavan Wadeyar	Pavan Wadeyar	4:28
Total length:				25:42

== Reception ==
=== Critical response ===
Googly received positive reviews from critics.

G. S. Kumar of The Times of India gave a 3.5/5 stars and wrote "Though the director has infused life into the story with excellent making, the narration could have been faster." Bangalore Mirror gave 3.5/5 stars and wrote "Wadeyar is in complete control of the proceedings. Though most part of the film focuses on the leading pair, there is hardly a dull moment. The film cements Pavan Wadeyar's position as one among the promising directors in the Kannada industry." B. S. Srivani of Deccan Herald gave 3/5 stars and praised the cast performances and music."

=== Box office ===
According to box office reports, Googly earned more than a crore on the first day and ₹45 million (US$470,000) within the first four days of its release. According to the producer, the film collected ₹70 million (US$730,000) gross at the box office in its first week. The film grossed ₹90−130 million (equivalent to ₹−240 million or US$−2.5 million in 2026) at the box office. The satellite rights were sold for ₹20 million (US$210,000).
