= Govindaya Namaha =

- Film poster
- Directed by: Pawan Wadeyar
- Written by: Pawan Wadeyar
- Produced by: Suresh
- Starring: Komal Kumar; Parul Yadav; Rekha Vedavyas
- Cinematography: Suresh Babu
- Edited by: Sanath Kumar; Suresh Arumugam
- Music by: Gurukiran
- Production company: Suresh Arts
- Release date: 30 March 2012
- Running time: 120 minutes
- Country: India
- Language: Kannada
- Box office: ₹8 crore (US$830,000)

Govindaya Namaha (transl. Hail Govinda) is a 2012 Indian Kannada language comedy drama film directed by debutante Pawan Wadeyar. The film was released on 30 March 2012 across cinema halls. It stars Komal Kumar, Anna Georgia, Madhulika, Rekha Vedavyas and Parul Yadav in the lead roles. The music is composed by Gurukiran. This film is remade as Potugadu in Telugu. The movie was accused to be a copy of 2006 Kannada movie Avnandre Avne. However Karnataka Film Directors Association writer's wing set aside the allegations as far from truth.

Music of this film has been received well and the song Pyarge Aagbittaite written by Pawan in Kannada and Urdu language mixture recorded an amazing hit in YouTube by hitting more than 1500000 views in less than a week of its release. This song is performed by Chethan and Indu Nagaraj and music by Gurukiran song was picturized on Komal Kumar and Parul at Bijapur Fort and Ibrahim Roza.

== Plot ==
Govinda pretends to be in love with three women later cheats and abandons them. However, he realises his mistake when the woman he loves cheats on him.

== Cast ==
- Komal Kumar as Govinda
- Rekha Vedavyas
- Parul Yadav as Mumtaz
- Anna Georgia
- Madhulika as Vydehi
- Mukhyamantri Chandru as Vydehi's father
- H. G. Dattatreya
- Raju Talikote
- Vinayak Joshi
- M. S. Umesh
- Tabla Nani as Nataraj
- Chikkanna as Gopal
- Kirloskar Sathya
- Jayasheela Gowda
- Manjunath Roy N.
- Sandeep Gowda as Pids Pokesh
- Kumar S. Raj
- Mahesh
- Vinod
- Rajuguru
- Deepu
- Ganga
- Harish Raj as Harsha

== Soundtrack ==
Govindaya Namaha

Soundtrack album by Gurukiran
- Released: 11 January 2012
- Genre: Feature film soundtrack
- Length: 19:27
- Label: Ashwini Media

Gurukiran composed the film's background score and music for its soundtrack, with the lyrics penned by Pawan Wadeyar, Santhosh Nayak, Shivananje Gowda and Jayant Kaikini. The album consists of five tracks.

No.	Title	Lyrics	Singer(s)	Length
1.	"Anthare Ivananna"	Pawan Wadeyar	Gururaj Hoskote	3:12
2.	"Laka Laka"	Shivananje Gowda	Gurukiran, Apoorva	3:35
3.	"Pyarge Aagbittaite"	Pawan Wadeyar	Chetan Sosca, Indu Nagaraj	4:13
4.	"Ninnindane"	Santhosh Nayak	Rajesh Krishnan	4:29
5.	"Sura Sundara"	Jayant Kaikini	Madhu Balakrishnan, Jyotsna	3:58
Total length:				19:27

== Reception ==
=== Critical response ===
A critic from The Times of India scored the film at 3.5 out of 5 stars and says "Don't miss the popular number Pyar ke Aagbuttaithe sung by Chethan and Indu Nagaraj to the lyric penned by Pavan Wadeyar, and excellent costume designing by Shachina Heggar, and the dance choreographed by Murali. A critic from News18 India wrote "'Govindaya Namaha' is an entertainer which should be watched for its entertaining values and it carries the message about futility of committing suicide". A critic from NDTV wrote "Govindaya Namaha is an entertainer which should be watched for its entertaining values and it carries the message about futility of committing suicide". A critic from Bangalore Mirror wrote "One thing that bugged audience on Day 1 was the dull look of the film which can be blamed on the satellite broadcast. More than 90 per cent of theatres screening the film are through satellite broadcast rather than the stock reel". A critic from The New Indian Express wrote "The only consolation are the four duets that are shot well with good editing. Gurukiran’s music has added popularity to the film. Parul Yadav makes for a gorgeous nurse and can be commended for her acting".

== Box office ==
The film was a surprise box office success and ran for a hundred days.

== Awards ==
Ceremony	Category	Nominee	Result
2nd South Indian International Movie Awards	Best Actress in a Supporting Role	Rekha Vedavyas	Nominated
2nd South Indian International Movie Awards	Best Comedian	Komal	Nominated
2nd South Indian International Movie Awards	Best Music Director	Gurukiran	Nominated
2nd South Indian International Movie Awards	Best Lyricist	Pawan for "Pyarge Agbittaite"	Nominated
2nd South Indian International Movie Awards	Best Female Playback Singer	Indu Nagaraj for "Pyarge Agbittaite"	Nominated
2nd South Indian International Movie Awards	Best Dance Choreographer	Murali for "Pyarge Agbittaite"	Nominated
2nd South Indian International Movie Awards	Best Debutant Producer	K. A. Suresh	Won
2nd South Indian International Movie Awards	Best Debutant Director	Pawan Wodeyar	Won
2nd South Indian International Movie Awards	Best Female Debutant	Parul Yadav	Won
60th Filmfare Awards South	Best Lyricist	Pavan Wadeyar	Nominated
