= Malaikottai =

2007 Indian Tamil film

- Theatrical release poster
- Directed by: Boopathy Pandian
- Written by: Boopathy Pandian
- Produced by: T. Ajay Kumar
- Starring: Vishal; Priyamani
- Cinematography: Vaidy S
- Edited by: G. Sasikumar
- Music by: Mani Sharma
- Production company: Sri Lakshmi Productions
- Release date: 28 September 2007
- Running time: 145 minutes
- Country: India
- Language: Tamil

Malaikottai (transl. Rock Fort) is a 2007 Indian Tamil-language action film written and directed by Boopathy Pandian. The film stars Vishal, Priyamani, Devaraj, Ajay, Ashish Vidyarthi, and Urvashi. The music was composed by Mani Sharma, while the cinematography and editing were handled by Vaidy S and G. Sasikumar respectively. The film was released on 28 September 2007 and became a commercial success.

== Plot ==
Anbu, a happy-go-lucky engineering student, lives with his family in Pattukottai and has fun with his friends. One day, Anbu gets into a fracas with a local politician and his henchmen while trying to save his friend, where he gets arrested and has a case registered against him. The local court gives him conditional bail, provided that he signs the register in a Trichy Fort police station. On the way to the police station, Anbu sees a college girl named Malar and falls in love with her. The police station, where Anbu has to sign daily, is handled by his uncle Inspector Kandasamy, whose ex-lover Kamala is the head constable at the station. Anbu kindles his uncle's love life and makes merry at Malar's college.

Meanwhile, Trichy is run by a powerful politician named Palani and his brother Guna, who have killed the local RDO in cold blood, watched by a huge crowd of onlookers. While trying to save Malar from a situation with Palani, Anbu ends up getting the wrath of Palani and his brothers. Although Malar's mother wants to move away from the city, Anbu and his aunt convince her to stay and makes Anbu as her protector. After seeing his care, Malar slowly falls for Anbu. Palani causes problems for Anbu, but Anbu overcomes them and gets Palani killed by Kandasamy in an encounter. Malar and Anbu graduates from college and they get married.

== Cast ==
- Vishal as Anbu
- Priyamani as Malar
- Devaraj as Palani
- Ajay as Guna, Palani's brother
- Ashish Vidyarthi as Inspector Kandasamy, Anbu's uncle
- Urvashi as Kamala, Head Constable, Anbu's mother
- Azhagu as Azhaguselvam, Anbu's father
- Kadhal Dhandapani as chairman, Pattukottai
- Mayilsamy as Idimutti Kannan
- Ponnambalam as Naai Bhaskar
- Poovilangu Mohan as Doctor
- Ajay Rathnam as RDO
- Deepa Venkat as RDO's wife
- Aarthi as Malar's friend
- Rekha as Malar's mother
- Nirosha as Viji, Kandasamy's wife
- G. M. Kumar as Kumar Annan, Pazhani's Righthand
- John Amirtharaj as Public Prosecutor
- V.M Raviraj as Trichy District Collector
- Manobala as Bhaskar's aide
- Scissor Manohar as Ravi, Constable
- Ashwanth Thilak (special appearance)
- Kanal Kannan as Mattu Sekar (special appearance)
- Sevvaalai Rasu, Chairman's sidekick

== Production ==
Principal photography commenced on 12 May 2007, at the Kumbakonam Mahamaham tank with picturisation of a song on Vishal. This was followed by shooting near the Srirangam temple, Tiruchirapalli central bus stand, Kollidam bridge, Thiruvaiyaru court and near the Cauvery bridge in Tiruchirapalli.

== Soundtrack ==
The music was composed by Mani Sharma. It includes a remix of "Yeh Aatha", composed by Ilaiyaraaja for the 1982 film Payanangal Mudivathillai. Karthik Srinivasan of Milliblog wrote "Ye aatha's remix rocks only because the source itself is a cracker of a track, conjured decades back. That says much less about Manisharma's score in Malaikottai – commonplace, uninspired and adequately boring". Contrarily, popular opinion is that even the other songs, original music creation by Mani Sharma, have been quite catchy and well received, to be considered a successful original soundtrack!

Song	Lyricist	Singers	Time
"Devathaye Vaa Vaa"	Yugabharathi	Vijay Yesudas	04:34
"Kantha Kadamba"	Na. Muthukumar	Naveen Madhav	05:23
"Oh Baby"	Yugabharathi	Rahul Nambiar	04:37
"Uyire Uyire"	Yugabharathi	Ranjith, Rita Thyagarajan	05:02
"Yeh Aatha"	Gangai Amaran	Tippu, Anuradha Sriram	04:01

== Release and reception ==
Rediff.com wrote that "Director G Boopathy Pandian probably thought he had the next best story since Ben-Hur, and fell prey to the ever-present Director's Folly". Sify described the film as a "big let-down". Chithra of Kalki wrote the screenplay is fast-paced and creates interest. Despite some scenes remind of seeing earlier, Bhoopathy Pandian has achieved what he want to. Malini Mannath of Chennai Online wrote "It's all that we have seen in earlier films. But it is the clever blend of action, comedy and sentiment, and it's racy narrative style, that keeps one engaged through 'Malaikottai'. The casting of actors in roles contrasting to their image works well here". Reviewing the Telugu-dubbed version Bhayya, Idlebrain.com wrote, "The plus points of the film are entertainment (aimed at masses) and action sequences. On the flipside, there is lot of violence in the film and Tamil nativity could be a problem too". Cinesouth appreciated the action and comedy sequences, but criticised the music and the film's use of clichéd villains.

== Impact ==
Priyamani, who previously played a rural, de-glamourised girl in Paruthiveeran (2007), shed that image by playing a modern, glamorous girl in Malaikottai, and the film was also responsible for making her a "commercially viable heroine" in Tamil films.
