= Parul Yadav =

Indian actress

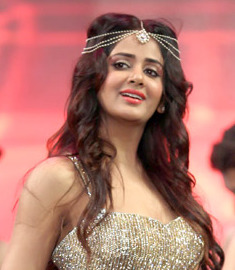
- Yadav 61st Idea Filmfare Awards South
- Born: Mumbai, Maharashtra, India
- Occupations: Actress; producer
- Years active: 2004 - 2018
- Website: www.parulyadav.com

Parul Yadav is an Indian actress who primarily appears in Kannada films. Her acting debut was in the 2004 Tamil film Dreams. Her performance in Aatagara (2015) earned her the Filmfare Award for Best Actress – Kannada. Yadav also won praises for her films, Bachchan (2013), Shivajinagara (2014), Vaastu Prakaara (2015) and Killing Veerappan (2016).

== Career ==
She made her acting debut in Mere Aagosh Mein (2000). Her first mainstream movie was the Tamil film Dreams, starring Dhanush. Her next movie was Krithyam in Malayalam opposite Prithviraj Sukumaran. She, then switched over to television with the daily soap-opera Bhagyavidhaata, which has aired on Colors since 2009. This was soon followed by the comedy reality show Comedy Ka Maha Muqabala on Star Plus, where she was a participant representing the team Raveena Ke Mohre.

In 2011, she made her Kannada film debut in Shivarajkumar's movie Bandhu Balaga as his sister-in-law. Later, she acted in Govindaya Namaha, which went on to become one of the highest-grossing films of that year. She played Mumtaz, a Muslim girl falling in love with Govinda, played by Komal Kumar. Her portrayal won her a SIIMA Best Debutant award (2013) and Bangalore Times Best Newcomer Award (2013) and a nomination in the Udaya Film Awards for the best actor category for that year. The song "Pyarge Aagbittaite", which featured Yadav, earned her more attention. The same pairing in the 2012 film Nandeesha, however, could not continue the success at the box office.

Yadav's next project was for the multi-starrer film Bachchan, directed by Shashank and starring Sudeep. Yadav then starred in Shivajinagara, produced by Ramu Films. She was paired opposite Duniya Vijay. The movie was a blockbuster having completed 100 days of screening in theatres.

In 2014, Yadav signed for two movies that became landmark projects of her career, Vaastu Prakaara and Uppi 2. She played an advocate in Vaastu Prakaara, which was directed by renowned film-maker Yogaraj Bhat. In Uppi 2, she is seen in a cameo opposite its director Upendra. Her latest release is K. M. Chaitanya's Aatagara, featuring an ensemble cast and Jessie. Her performance in Jessie won her widespread appreciation. Upcoming films of Yadav include Seizer and Vijayaditya.

Yadav's biggest movie of her career is Killing Veerappan, directed in multiple languages by Ram Gopal Varma. Kannada actor Shiva Rajkumar plays a police officer and Yadav is paired with him. Killing Veerappan was also dubbed and released in Tamil and Telugu.

From 2017 to 2022, Yadav produced the simultaneous production of the 4 South Indian language remakes of the Hindi superhit Queen. She also played the lead in the Kannada version Butterfly, directed by Ramesh Aravind. Besides the lead role, Yadav is also the co-producer.

== Filmography ==
=== Film ===
Key
†	Denotes films that have not yet been released

Year	Film	Role	Language	Notes
2004	Dreams	Charu	Tamil	
2005	Krithyam	Sandra Punnoose	Malayalam	
2008	Bullet	Gayathri	Malayalam	
2008	Bandhu Balaga	Chamundeshwari	Kannada	
2009	Black Dalia	Linda D'Souza	Malayalam	
2012	Govindaya Namaha	Mumtaz	Kannada	
2012	Nandeesha	Sonia	Kannada	
2013	Bachchan	Anjali	Kannada	
2013	Shravani Subramanya	Benne	Kannada	Special appearance
2014	Shivajinagara	Pavithra	Kannada	
2015	Pulan Visaranai 2	Sonya Varma	Tamil	
2015	Vaastu Prakaara	Nirmala	Kannada	
2015	Uppi 2	Sheela	Kannada	Extended cameo
2015	Aatagara	Mallika	Kannada	
2016	Killing Veerappan	Shreya	Kannada	
2016	Jessie	Nandini	Kannada	
2018	Seizer	Divya	Kannada	
TBA	Butterfly	Parvati	Kannada	Unreleased

=== Television ===
- 2007 – Yes Boss – SAB TV
- 2007 – Sautela – DD National
- 2009 – Bhagyavidhaata – Colors
- 2011 – Comedy Ka Maha Muqabala – Star Plus
- 2015 – Darr Sabko Lagta Hai (episode nine) – &TV

== Awards ==
Work	Award	Category	Result	Ref
Bachchan	61st Filmfare Awards South	Best Supporting Actress – Kannada	Nominated	
Bachchan	3rd SIIMA Awards	Best Supporting Actress	Nominated	
Bachchan	Santosham Awards	Best Supporting Actress	Won	
Shivajinagar	4th SIIMA Awards	Best Actress	Nominated	
Aatagara	63rd Filmfare Awards South	Best Actress – Kannada	Won	
Aatagara	South Scope Awards	Rising Sensation of the Year	Won	
Vaastu Prakaara	5th SIIMA Awards	Best Actress	Nominated	
Killing Veerappan	6th South Indian International Movie Awards	Best Actress – Kannada	Nominated	
Killing Veerappan	6th South Indian International Movie Awards	Best Actress (Critics)	Won	
Killing Veerappan	2nd IIFA Utsavam	Best Actress	Won	
Killing Veerappan	64th Filmfare Awards South	Best Actress – Kannada	Nominated	
