= Pyarge Aagbittaite =

Song by Chetan Sosca, Indu Nagaraj

from the album Govindaya Namaha
- Language: Kannada
- Released: 11 January 2012
- Genre: Filmi, Techno, folk
- Length: 4:13
- Label: Ashwini Media
- Composers: Gurukiran, Achu Rajamani
- Lyricist: Pawan Wadeyar

"Pyarge Aagbittaite" is a Kannada-Urdu song from the 2012 Kannada film Govindaya Namaha. It was composed by Gurukiran and sung by Chetan Sosca, Indu Nagaraj, with lyrics written by Pawan Wadeyar. The music video of the track features Komal and Parul Yadav.

The lyrics of the song includes a mixture of Kannada and Urdu languages. Upon its release on YouTube, it recorded 80,000 hits in three days and 5.5 lakh hits in 12 days from its release. Picturized on Komal Kumar and Parul Yadav, it was filmed at Bijapur Fort and Ibrahim Roza. The media called it another version of the 2011 hit Tamil song "Kolaveri Di". Shivajinagar lingo (Urdu-speaking community's dialect) is used in the lyrics of the song.

== Composition ==
Music composer Guru Kiran is also happy about the song's success. "It was Komal who brought me on board this project and this is the first time that I'm working on one of his films. When well-known actors like Sudeep, Darshan or Puneeth Rajkumar are involved in the film, the success of a song is a different deal. But for Komal, it's a different ball game altogether. We are all happy with the response," said in an interview.

== Reception ==
In a music review of Govindaya Namaha, a writer from milliblog called this song "one heck of an innovative song, with a lovely retro to mod transition mid-way and superb singing by Chetan and Indu Nagaraj; even the Urdu lyrics mixed is highly imaginative!"

== Other versions ==
The song was titled as "Pyar Mein Padipoya" in Potugadu (2013).

== Legacy ==
After the makers couldn't use the original name for one of Komal's films in 2013, the film was renamed after this song.
