= Indu Nagaraj =

Indian Kannada singer

- Origin: Mysore, India
- Genres: Filmi, Carnatic classical
- Occupations: Singer, Television actress
- Years active: 2007–present

Indu Nagaraj is an Indian playback singer who primarily works in Kannada cinema. She is the recipient of a Filmfare Award for the song "Pyarge Aagbittaite" from the film Govindaya Namaha (2012).

== Life and career ==
She sang for many films which had compositions by Gurukiran, Arjun Janya and V. Harikrishna.

In 2012, Indu won the Filmfare Award for Best Female Playback Singer for the song "Pyarge Aagbittaite" from the film Govindaya Namaha.

== Discography ==
This is a partial list of notable films of Indu Nagaraj.

Year	Film	Title	Composer	Co-singer(s)	Notes
2007	Meera Madhava Raghava	"Olle Time Banthamma"	Hamsalekha		
2008	Nee Tata Naa Birla	"Sakhi Sakhi"	Gurukiran		
2012	Govindaya Namaha	"Pyarge Aagbittaite"	Gurukiran	Chetan Sosca	Won - Filmfare Award for Best Female Playback Singer; Udaya Film Award for Best Female Singer
2013	Potugadu	"Pyar Mei Padipoyane"	Gurukiran	Manoj Manchu	Telugu film Nominated - Filmfare Award for Best Female Playback Singer
2013	Bachchan	"Onchuru Baggi Mathadu"	V. Harikrishna	Sudeep	
2013	Brindavana	"Oye Kalla"	V. Harikrishna	Upendra	Nominated - SIIMA Award for Best Female Singer
2015	Bullet Basya	"Kaal KG Kallekayi"	Arjun Janya	Sharan	
2015	RX Soori	"Butte Butte"	Arjun Janya	Naveen Sajju	
2015	Masterpiece	"I Can't Wait Baby"	V. Harikrishna	Tippu	
2015	Mr. Airavata	"Ka Thalkattu Ka"	V. Harikrishna		
2015	Plus	"Sunday Banthu"	Bharath B. J.		
2016	Killing Veerappan	"Hayya Hayya"	Ravishankar		
2016	Parapancha	"Baayi Basale Soppu"	V. Harikrishna		
2016	Maduveya Mamatheya Kareyole	"Bangaru"	V. Harikrishna		
2016	Jai Maruthi 800	"Jai Maruthi"	Arjun Janya	Puneeth Rajkumar	
2016	Jai Maruthi 800	"Rajasthani Pungi"		Arjun Janya	
2016	Lakshmana	"Rave Rave"	Arjun Janya		
2016	Kalpana 2	"Lightaagi"	Arjun Janya	Vijay Prakash	
2016	Doddmane Hudga	"Thraas Akkathi"	V. Harikrishna		Won - SIIMA Award for Best Female Singer
2016	Nagarahavu	"Aledaado Megha"	Gurukiran		
2016	Pushpaka Vimana	"Jilka Jilka"	Charan Raj		
2016	Kirik Party	"Hey who are you"	Ajaneesh Lokanath	Bharath B J	
2017	Raj Vishnu	"Suvvana Suvvanaare"	Arjun Janya		
2017	Bharjari	"Ranga Baaro"	V. Harikrishna		
2017	Bangalore Underworld	"Naane Neenu"	Anoop Seelin		
2017	Raaga	"Belakendare"	Arjun Janya		
2017	Tarak	"Sanje Hotthu"	Arjun Janya	Vijay Prakash	
2018	Johny Johny Yes Papa	"Hosa Padmavathi"	Ajaneesh Lokanath	Vijay Prakash	
2018	Life Jothe Ondu Selfie	"Alakku Myaale"	V. Harikrishna		
2019	Yaana	"Mirchi Song"	Joshua Sridhar	Supriya Lohith, Santhosh Venky	
2019	Odeya	"Shyaane Love Aagoythalle Nanji"	Arjun Janya	Hemanth	
2019	India vs England	"Kannada Kali"	Arjun Janya		
2023	Love Birds	"Neene Dohretha Mele"	Arjun Janya		
2024	Krishnam Pranaya Sakhi	"Chinnamma"	Arjun Janya	Kailash Kher	
2026	Ayogya 2	"Milky Beauty"	Arjun Janya	Nishan Rai	

== Television ==
Year	Television	Role	Notes
2021-2022	Sa Re Ga Ma Pa Championship	Mentor	
