= Anushka Shetty filmography =

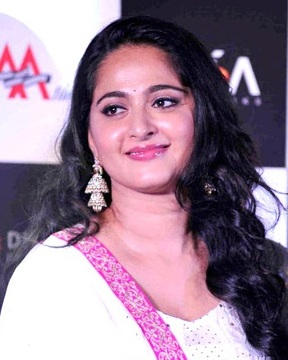
Shetty in 2015

Anushka Shetty is an Indian actress who appears in Telugu and Tamil films. Regarded one of the most successful and greatest actresses in the history of Telugu cinema, Anushka is particularly known for her versatility. With a cinematic career spanning over two decades, she has played pivotal roles in over 50 films. She made her acting debut in Puri Jagannadh's 2005 Telugu film Super, and appeared in Mahanandi, released later the same year. The following year, she had four releases, the first being S. S. Rajamouli's Vikramarkudu, which helped her gain recognition, followed by Astram (a remake of the 1999 Hindi film Sarfarosh), the Sundar C-directed Rendu, (which marked her debut in Tamil cinema), and a special appearance in AR Murugadoss' Telugu film Stalin. She had two releases in 2007: Lakshyam and Don. In 2008, she appeared in six films, including Okka Magaadu, Swagatam and Souryam. In 2009, Shetty played two roles in the fantasy Arundhati. She went on to win the Nandi Special Jury Award and the Filmfare Best Telugu Actress Award for this film. Her next release that year was Billa, a Telugu remake of the 1978 Hindi film of the same name. Her final release in 2009 was her second Tamil feature film, the masala film Vettaikaaran, where she appeared as a medical student.

Shetty had a string of releases in 2010. She portrayed a prostitute in Krish's Vedam, which won her the Filmfare Award for Best Telugu Actress. Despite critical acclaim, the film failed at the box office. None of her other releases in 2010 succeeded commercially, except for her sole Tamil release of the year, the masala Singam. The following year, Anushka had two releases, both in Tamil. She reprised her Vedam role in its remake Vaanam, then appeared as an advocate in the A. L. Vijay-directed Deiva Thirumagal, a loose adaptation of the American film I Am Sam (2001). The following year, she also had two releases: Thaandavam in Tamil, and Damarukam in Telugu. Her first release in 2013 was Suraj's Tamil masala Alex Pandian, a critical and commercial failure. This was followed by Mirchi in Telugu, Singam II (where she reprised her role from Singam), and Selvaraghavan's Tamil romantic fantasy Irandaam Ulagam where she played three distinct roles. Her sole release of 2014 was K. S. Ravikumar's Lingaa.

In 2015, Shetty appeared in Gautham Vasudev Menon's Yennai Arindhaal, followed by Rajamouli's Telugu-Tamil bilingual Baahubali: The Beginning, where she played a queen named Devasena. Her performance as Rudrama Devi, a monarch of the Kakatiya dynasty in the eponymous film won her the Filmfare Award for Best Telugu Actress. She then appeared in the Telugu romantic comedy Size Zero (filmed simultaneously in Tamil as Inji Iduppazhagi), in a role for which she gained 20 kilograms (44 lb) of weight. Her only roles in 2016 were cameos in Soggade Chinni Nayana and Oopiri (filmed in Tamil as Thozha). The following year, she appeared in Si3 (the third film in the Singam series), the semi-biographical Om Namo Venkatesaya, where she played a character inspired by Andal, and Rajamouli's Telugu film Baahubali 2: The Conclusion, where she reprised her role from its predecessor. Her only release in 2018 was the Telugu-Tamil bilingual Bhaagamathie. She appeared in a cameo role of Jhansi Lakshmi Bhai in Sye Raa Narasimha Reddy which is her only release in 2019 . Later she appeared in Nishabdham which was an OTT Release. After a gap of few years she made her comeback with Miss Shetty Mr Polishetty in 2023, her portrayal as a master chef got her critical acclaim. She acted in Krish Jagarlamudi's Ghaati (2025). She is making her Malayalam debut with Kathanar alongside Jayasurya in Rojin Thomas' direction.

== Films ==
Key
| † | Denotes films that have not yet been released |

| Year | Title | Role(s) | Language | Notes | Ref. |
|---|---|---|---|---|---|
| 2005 | Super | Sasha | Telugu | | |
| 2005 | Mahanandi | Nandini | Telugu | | |
| 2006 | Astram | Anusha | Telugu | | |
| 2006 | Vikramarkudu | Neeraja Goswami | Telugu | | |
| 2006 | Stalin | Herself | Telugu | Special appearance in the song "I Wanna Spider Man" | |
| 2006 | Rendu | Jyothi | Tamil | | |
| 2007 | Lakshyam | Indu | Telugu | | |
| 2007 | Don | Priya | Telugu | | |
| 2008 | Okka Magaadu | Bhavani | Telugu | | |
| 2008 | Swagatam | Sailaja (Sailu) | Telugu | | |
| 2008 | Baladoor | Bhanu | Telugu | | |
| 2008 | Souryam | Swetha | Telugu | | |
| 2008 | Chintakayala Ravi | Sunitha | Telugu | | |
| 2008 | King | Herself | Telugu | Special appearance in the song "Nuvvu Ready Nenu Ready" | |
| 2009 | Arundhati | Arundhati / Jejamma (Note: Anushka Shetty plays two characters.) | Telugu | | |
| 2009 | Billa | Maya | Telugu | | |
| 2009 | Vettaikaaran | Susheela (Susi) | Tamil | | |
| 2010 | Kedi | Herself | Telugu | Special appearance in the song "Kedigaadu" | |
| 2010 | Singam | Kavya Mahalingam | Tamil | | |
| 2010 | Vedam | Saroja | Telugu | | |
| 2010 | Panchakshari | Panchakshari / Honey / Goddess Durga (Note: Anushka Shetty plays three characters.) | Telugu | | |
| 2010 | Khaleja | Subashini | Telugu | | |
| 2010 | Thakita Thakita | Herself | Telugu | Cameo appearance | |
| 2010 | Nagavalli | Chandramukhi (Nagavalli) (Note: Anushka Shetty plays one character with two names.) | Telugu | | |
| 2010 | Ragada | Sirisha | Telugu | 25th Film | |
| 2011 | Vaanam | Saroja (Note: Most of her scenes were reused from Vedam (2010).) | Tamil | | |
| 2011 | Deiva Thirumagal | Anuradha Raghunathan | Tamil | | |
| 2012 | Saguni | Inspector Anushka | Tamil | Cameo appearance | |
| 2012 | Thaandavam | Dr. Meenakshi Shiva Kumar | Tamil | | |
| 2012 | Damarukam | Maheshwari (Mahi) | Telugu | | |
| 2013 | Alex Pandian | Divya | Tamil | | |
| 2013 | Mirchi | Vennela | Telugu | | |
| 2013 | Singam II | Kavya Mahalingam | Tamil | | |
| 2013 | Irandaam Ulagam | Ramya / Varna / Anushka | Tamil | | |
| 2014 | Lingaa | Lakshmi | Tamil | | |
| 2015 | Yennai Arindhaal | Thenmozhi | Tamil | | |
| 2015 | Baahubali: The Beginning | Devasena | Telugu | Bilingual film | |
| 2015 | Baahubali: The Beginning | Devasenai | Tamil | Bilingual film | |
| 2015 | Rudhramadevi | Rudrama Devi (Rudradeva Maharaja) | Telugu | | |
| 2015 | Size Zero | Soundarya (Sweety) | Telugu | Bilingual film | |
| 2015 | Inji Iduppazhagi | Soundarya (Sweety) | Tamil | Bilingual film | |
| 2016 | Soggade Chinni Nayana | Krishna Kumari | Telugu | Cameo appearance | |
| 2016 | Oopiri | Nandini | Telugu | Bilingual film; cameo appearance | |
| 2016 | Thozha | Nandini | Tamil | Bilingual film; cameo appearance | |
| 2017 | Si3 | Kavya Durai Singam | Tamil | | |
| 2017 | Om Namo Venkatesaya | Krishnamma | Telugu | | |
| 2017 | Baahubali 2: The Conclusion | Devasena | Telugu | Partially reshot in Tamil | |
| 2018 | Bhaagamathie | Bhaagamathie / Chanchala | Telugu | Bilingual film | |
| 2018 | Bhaagamathie | Bhaagamathie / Sanchala | Tamil | Bilingual film | |
| 2019 | Sye Raa Narasimha Reddy | Rani Lakshmi Bai | Telugu | Cameo appearance | |
| 2020 | Nishabdham | Sakshi | Telugu | Partially reshot in Tamil (Note: The film was also partially reshot in Tamil. However, she did not reshoot any scenes since she plays a mute character.) | |
| 2023 | Miss Shetty Mr Polishetty | Anvitha Ravali Shetty | Telugu | | |
| 2025 | Ghaati | Sheelavathi | Telugu | | |
| 2025 | Baahubali: The Epic | Devasena | Telugu | Combined re-release version of The Beginning and The Conclusion | |
| 2026 | Kathanar – The Wild Sorcerer † | Nila | Malayalam | 50th Film; Post-production | |

== Television ==
| Year | Title | Role(s) | Language | Network | Notes | Ref. |
|---|---|---|---|---|---|---|
| 2007 | Yuva | Naga Lakshmi | Telugu | Star Maa | Episode 86; Special Appearance | |
| 2026 | Baahubali: The Torchbearer | Herself | Telugu | Netflix | Documentary Mini Series | |

== Music videos ==
| Year | Title | Role | Language | Performer | Album | Notes | Ref. |
|---|---|---|---|---|---|---|---|
| 2012 | "Sachin Anthem" | Herself | Tamil | Dhanush | - | Promotional tribute video for cricket icon Sachin Tendulkar, made in association with Boost. | |

== See also ==
- List of awards and nominations received by Anushka Shetty
