= List of awards and nominations received by Anushka Shetty =

Anushka Shetty awards and nominations
Awards and nominations
Award	Wins	Nominations
Filmfare Awards South	3	11
South Indian International Movie Awards	2	6
Nandi Awards	2	N/A
Tamil Nadu State Film Awards	1	N/A
CineMAA Awards	3	4
Santosham Film Awards	3	6
Vijay Awards	2	7
Kalaimamani Awards	1	N/A
Behindwoods Gold Medal	1	1
IIFA Utsavam	0	4
Edison Awards (Tamil)	0	7
Ugadi Awards (Telugu)	3	3
TSR-TV9 National Film Awards	1	6
International Tamil Film Awards	0	2
Jaya TV Awards	1	1
Apsara Awards	2	2
Other Awards	6	13

Totals (Note: Certain award groups do not simply award one winner. They acknowledge several different recipients, have runners-up, and have third place. Since this is a specific recognition and is different from losing an award, runner-up mentions are considered wins in this award tally. For simplification and to avoid errors, each award in this list has been presumed to have had a prior nomination.)
- Wins: 32
- Nominations: 74

Anushka Shetty is an Indian actress, who primarily works in the South Indian film industries. A three-time Filmfare Award recipient, Shetty has also received two Nandi awards and a Tamil Nadu State Film Award & Kalaimamani from the state governments of Andhra Pradesh and Tamil Nadu respectively.

== Filmfare Awards South ==
Year	Artist/Work	Category	Language	Result
2005	Super	Best Supporting Actress	Telugu	Nominated
2009	Arundhati	Best Actress	Telugu	Won
2010	Vedam	Best Actress	Telugu	Won
2010	Nagavalli	Best Actress	Telugu	Nominated
2011	Deiva Thirumagal	Best Actress	Tamil	Nominated
2012	Dhamarukam	Best Actress	Telugu	Nominated
2013	Mirchi	Best Actress	Telugu	Nominated
2015	Rudhramadevi	Best Actress	Telugu	Won
2017	Baahubali 2 :The Conclusion	Best Actress	Telugu	Nominated
2018	Bhaagamathie	Best Actress	Telugu	Nominated
2023	Miss Shetty Mr Polishetty	Best Actress	Telugu	Nominated

== South Indian International Movie Awards ==
Year	Artist/Work	Category	Language	Result
2011	Deiva Thirumagal	Best Actress	Tamil	Nominated
2011	Anushka Shetty	Youth Icon of South Indian Cinema	-	Won
2015	Rudhramadevi	Best Actress	Telugu	Nominated
2015	Rudhramadevi	Best Actress (Critics)	Telugu	Won
2017	Baahubali 2 : The Conclusion	Best Actress	Telugu	Nominated
2018	Bhaagamathie	Best Actress	Telugu	Nominated

== Nandi Awards ==
Year	Artist/Work	Category	Result
2008	Arundhati	Special Jury Award	Won
2015	Size Zero	Best Actress	Won

== Tamil Nadu State Film Awards ==
Year	Artist/Work	Category	Result
2011	Deiva Thirumagal	Special Prize - Best Actress	Won

== CineMAA Awards ==
Year	Artist/Work	Category	Language	Result
2009	Arundhati	Best Actress	Telugu	Won
2010	Vedam	Best Actress	Telugu	Nominated
2010	Vedam	Best Actress (Jury)	Telugu	Won
2015	Rudhramadevi	Best Actress	Telugu	Won

== Santosham Film Awards ==
Year	Artist/Work	Category	Language	Result
2009	Arundhati	Best Actress	Telugu	Won
2010	Vedam	Best Actress	Telugu	Won
2013	Mirchi	Best Actress	Telugu	Nominated
2015	Rudhramadevi	Best Actress	Telugu	Won
2017	Baahubali 2: The Conclusion	Best Actress	Telugu	Nominated
2018	Bhaagamathie	Best Actress	Telugu	Nominated

== Vijay Awards ==
Year	Artist/Work	Category	Result
2009	Vettaikaran	Favorite Heroine	Won
2010	Singam	Favorite Heroine	Nominated
2011	Deiva Thirumagal	Favorite Heroine	Won
2011	Deiva Thirumagal	Best Actress	Nominated
2012	Thaandavam	Favourite Heroine	Nominated
2013	Singam 2	Favourite Heroine	Nominated
2017	Baahubali 2: The Conclusion	Favourite Heroine	Nominated

== Zee Cine Awards - Telugu ==
Year	Artist/Work	Category	Result
2017	Baahubali 2: The Conclusion	Best Actress in a Leading Role	Nominated
2017	Baahubali 2: The Conclusion & Om Namo Venkatesaya	Favourite Actress	Nominated
2018	Bhaagamathie	Favourite Actress	Nominated
2018	Bhaagamathie	Best Actress in a Leading Role	Nominated

== Edison Awards (Tamil) ==
Year	Artist/Work	Category	Result
2010	Singam	Best Actress	Nominated
2010	Singam	The Gorgeous Belle	Nominated
2011	Deiva Thirumagal	Favourite Actress	Nominated
2011	Vaanam	Best Actress	Nominated
2012	Thaandavam	Best Actress	Nominated
2015	Inji Iduppazhagi	Best Actress	Nominated
2017	Baahubali 2: The Conclusion	Best Actress	Nominated

== International Tamil Film Awards ==
Year	Artist/Work	Category	Result
2011	Deiva Thirumagal	Best Actress	Nominated
2011	Vaanam	Best Actress	Nominated

== International Indian Film Academy Awards|IIFA Utsavam ==
Year	Category	Film	Language	Result
2016	Best Actress	Baahubali: The Beginning	Tamil	Nominated
2017	Best Actress	Rudhramadevi	Telugu	Nominated
2017	Best Actress	Size Zero	Telugu	Nominated
2024	Best Actress	Miss Shetty Mr Polishetty	Telugu	Nominated

== Other awards and honours ==
Year	Honouring body	Category	Ref.
2011	Tamil Nadu Government	Kalaimamani Award by Tamil Nadu State Government	
