= Alex Pandian =

2013 Indian film directed by Suraj

- Theatrical release poster
- Directed by: Suraj
- Written by: Suraj
- Produced by: K. E. Gnanavel Raja
- Starring: Karthi; Anushka Shetty; Santhanam; Milind Soman; Suman
- Cinematography: S. Saravanan
- Edited by: Praveen K. L. N. B. Srikanth
- Music by: Devi Sri Prasad
- Production company: Studio Green
- Release date: 11 January 2013
- Running time: 162 minutes
- Country: India
- Language: Tamil

Alex Pandian is a 2013 Indian Tamil-language action comedy film written and directed by Suraj and produced by K. E. Gnanavel Raja. The film features Karthi as the titular character along with Anushka Shetty, while Santhanam, Milind Soman and Suman, among others, play supporting roles. The music was composed by Devi Sri Prasad. The film released on 11 January 2013, and was poorly received.

== Plot ==
The film starts with Alex Pandian and Divya jumping off a train in an attempt to escape the goons who are seeking to kill them. Three days later, Alex enters Kaalayan's house. Alex's playful attitude and closeness with Kaalayan's three sisters irritates him, and he makes many attempts to evict Alex from his house, but it only makes the bond between Alex and the sisters stronger. Alex also comes into conflict and shaves the head of a local goon, whose brother Parthiban swears revenge on him, but later, it is revealed that like the movie Paruthiveeran, Alex and Parthiban are old friends, and they come to terms. Meanwhile, Divya is receiving treatment, chemist Alvin Martin and corrupt doctor GKM are in search of the two. Upon finding Alex and Divya, the goons chase them. Kaalayan demands to know who Divya is. Divya happens to be the daughter of the Chief Minister. Alex, a local thief, is asked to kidnap Divya for three days so that the CM would sign the papers which would allow Alvin and GKM to distribute fake medicines with devastating side effects. Alex brings her and keeps her as a hostage in a forest. On the third day, as Alex is driving back, Divya explains the reason for why she was asked to be kidnapped and thus requests him to take her back to her father. Alex decides to save Divya. The film shifts back to the present and by now, Divya has fallen in love with Alex. As fate would have it, the goons arrive at their hiding place. The film ends with Alex killing the villains and uniting with Divya.

== Cast ==
- Karthi as Alex Pandian
- Anushka Shetty as Divya
- Santhanam as Kaalayan
- Milind Soman as Alvin Martin
- Suman as Dr. GKM
- Visu as Chief Minister
- Prathap Pothen as Radhakrishnan (CM's secretary)
- Saravanan as Parthiban
- Mahadevan as Swamiji
- Nikita Thukral as Gayathri, Kaalayan's elder sister
- Akanksha Puri as Kaalayan's middle sister
- Sanusha as Sneha, Kaalayan's younger sister
- Manobala as Captain Divakaran
- Raj Kapoor as Muthuvel (Police Commissioner)
- Santhana Bharathi as Home Minister
- Renuka as Rani
- Vaiyapuri as Nandu
- Lollu Sabha Manohar as Saani Urundai
- Aryan as Rowdy
- Vichu Vishwanath

== Production ==
=== Development ===
In March 2011, the film was titled as Alex Pandiyan named after Rajinikanth's character from Moondru Mugam. Karthi described Alex Pandian as a masala film since, like other films in the genre, it was a mixture of "entertainment, action and comedy".

=== Casting ===
In April 2011, it was announced that the film would be shot and readied for an August 2011 release. Anushka Shetty was signed on to play the leading female role in the film, after delivering consecutive box office successes with Singam, Vaanam and Deiva Thirumagal. Nikita Thukral and Lakshmi Rai both claimed they had signed on to play the second heroine, before Suraj later confirmed that Thukral had edged it. Suraj revealed that Meghna would play another heroine – though conflicting reports had given the role to Meghna Naidu, Meghna Raj and Meghna Nair of Siruthai fame. The role was later given to newcomer Akanksha Puri. Sanusha was roped in for another leading female role in the film, while it was confirmed that Santhanam would play brother to the three girls apart from Anushka. Milind Soman and Suman were selected to play negative roles, while Prathap Pothen was selected for a pivotal role.

=== Filming ===
Shooting started on 11 November 2011 at Chalakudy, Kerala without a title. In March 2012, Gnanavel Raja alleged that Ameer Sultan had stalled the shooting of the film, but he refuted the allegations. A stunt sequence on a train with Karthi and Anushka with the supervision of Ganesh with six cameras under the expertise of cameraman Saravanan, a train was hired for 15 days for this daring sequence which ran for a length of 30 km from Mysore to Krishnarajasagar dam, A sum of around 20 million was spent on the stunt sequence with 50 stunt artistes flying in from Chennai for the shoot. Over 300 junior artistes were involved in the sequence apart from Milind Soman and Suman.

== Music ==
The film's music was composed by Devi Sri Prasad. The audio rights were secured by Gemini Audio. The album was released on 12 December 2012, Rajinikanth's birthday.

Track listing
No.	Title	Lyrics	Singer(s)	Length
1.	"Onnam Class"	Vaali	Mukesh Mohamed, Priyadarshini	3:54
2.	"Thakka Thaiyaa"	Viveka	Karthik	5:07
3.	"Naalu Pakkam"	Viveka	Devi Sri Prasad, Anitha Karthikeyan	4:39
4.	"Bad Boy"	Karunakaran	Baba Sehgal, Priya Himesh	4:27
5.	"Rayya Rayya"	Pa. Vijay	Javed Ali, Ranina Reddy	4:04
Total length:				22:11

== Release and response ==
Alex Pandian was initially scheduled to release on 12 January 2013, but was advanced to the day before, 11 January. A critic from Sify described it as a "potpourri of commercial mass masala not mixed in the right proportion", going on to conclude: "An old-fashioned entertainer that plays to the gallery, Alex Pandian is exaggerated and formulaic". Pavithra Srinivasan from Rediff stated that the film was a "masala, cliche-ridden entertainer which fails miserably", calling it a "disaster", while giving it 1.5 stars out 5. The Times of India gave it 2.5 out of 5 and wrote, "Alex Pandian, while not really a bad film or a badly-made one, often feels strictly functional. Yes, the comedy sequences work and save the film to an extent, but considering its minimal ambitions, a sense of deja vu and disappointment as you leave the theatre is inescapable". The Hindu's Malathi Rangarajan wrote, "Karthi tries to infuse spirit and energy into the film with an ample dose of humour, but the story that's run of the mill and comedy that tires you after a point offer little help". Deccan Chronicle wrote that the film "may fail to enthral even die-hard Karthi fans". Malini Mannath of The New Indian Express wrote, "A remix of what we’ve seen in earlier mass entertainers, the film is mainly old wine in a new bottle. Alex Pandian doesn’t take himself too seriously. So there is no reason why we should!"
