= Miss Shetty Mr Polishetty =

- Theatrical release poster
- Directed by: Mahesh Babu Pachigolla
- Written by: Mahesh Babu Pachigolla
- Produced by: V. Vamsi Krishna Reddy; Pramod Uppalapati
- Starring: Anushka Shetty; Naveen Polishetty
- Cinematography: Nirav Shah
- Edited by: Kotagiri Venkateswara Rao
- Music by: Score: Gopi Sundar; Songs: Radhan
- Production company: UV Creations
- Release date: 7 September 2023
- Running time: 147 minutes
- Country: India
- Language: Telugu
- Budget: ₹20 crore
- Box office: est.₹50 crore

Miss Shetty Mr Polishetty is a 2023 Indian Telugu-language romantic comedy film written and directed by Mahesh Babu Pachigolla in his directoral debut. Produced by V.Vamsi Krishna Reddy and Pramod Uppalapati under the banner UV Creations, the film features Anushka Shetty and Naveen Polishetty.

The film was formally announced in March 2021, later the film's title was revealed to be Miss Shetty Mr Polishetty. The music is composed by Radhan (songs) and Gopi Sundar (score), while the cinematography and the editing were handled by Nirav Shah and Kotagiri.V respectively.

Miss Shetty Mr Polishetty was released theatrically on 7 September 2023 to positive reviews from critics and audiences. It emerged as commercial blockbuster.

== Plot ==
Anvitha Ravali Shetty, a 38-year-old chef living in the UK, has lost faith in marriage after witnessing her parents’ failed relationship. Her mother, who is terminally ill with cancer, worries about Anvitha’s future and urges her to marry, but Anvitha refuses. Her mother returns to India to spend her final days and dies a few months later, leaving Anvitha alone.

Feeling lonely, Anvitha decides she wants a child but not a husband. She chooses to become a mother through In vitro fertilisation (IVF), but is uncomfortable with the anonymity of sperm donors and decides to personally find someone suitable. With the help of her friend Kavya, she begins interviewing potential candidates, setting strict criteria.

During this process, she meets Siddhu Polishetty, a 33-year-old stand-up comedian from Hyderabad. Impressed by his personality, Anvitha spends time with him to evaluate him as a potential donor. Unaware of her intentions, Siddhu gradually falls in love with her and eventually proposes marriage. Anvitha rejects the proposal and reveals her plan to have a child through IVF using him as the donor. Offended and hurt, Siddhu calls the idea “cheap,” and the two part ways.

However, Siddhu later becomes upset when he learns that Anvitha continues interviewing other candidates. Realizing he still cares deeply for her, he apologizes and agrees to be the donor. Initially misunderstanding the process, he assumes they will conceive naturally, but later accepts IVF and commits to improving his health to increase the chances of success. During the lengthy preparation period, tensions arise between them, and Anvitha reveals that her fear of marriage stems from the trauma of her parents’ divorce. Siddhu sympathizes and continues supporting her.

When the IVF procedure is scheduled, the legal agreement states that the donor must have no contact with the mother or child afterward. Though heartbroken, Siddhu accepts the terms and asks Anvitha to tell their future child that their father truly loved her rather than describing him as only a donor. The procedure succeeds, and Anvitha becomes pregnant.

She attempts to share the news with Siddhu, but his friend Rahul stops her, reminding her of the contract to spare Siddhu further emotional pain. Anvitha returns to the UK and moves to the countryside. Meanwhile, Siddhu gains popularity as a stand-up comedian. Encouraged by his father, he travels to the UK in search of her.

After a long search, Siddhu arrives at the hospital as Anvitha goes into labor. Initially prevented from entering, he is allowed in when Anvitha identifies him as the father. Siddhu discovers that Anvitha has already listed his name as the child’s father on the medical forms. A few days later, the couple marry and begin raising their daughter together.

== Cast ==
- Anushka Shetty as Anvitha Ravali Shetty
- Naveen Polishetty as Sidhu Polishetty
- Jayasudha as Anvitha's mother
- Nassar as DK
- Murali Sharma as Phanindra Polishetty, Sidhu's father
- Tulasi as Revathi Polishetty, Sidhu's mother
- Sonia Deepti as Kavya, Anvitha's friend
- Rakesh Varre as Aditya
- Harsha Vardhan as a doctor
- Abhinav Gomatam as Rahul, Sidhu's friend
- Kamal Kamaraju as Raghu Rayudu
- Bhadram as Sidhu's colleague
- Mahesh Achanta as Srinu
- Narasimha Raju
- Rohini as Sidhu's colleague
- Pavani Gangireddy

== Production ==
The film was produced by Vamsi Krishna Reddy and Pramod Uppalapati under the banner of UV Creations. It was revealed in March 2021 that the production company had discussed having Anushka star alongside Naveen in the film, which would be the tale of a 30-year-old woman who falls in love with a 25-year-old man. Later, the title of the film was revealed as Miss Shetty Mr Polishetty. This film is a comeback film for Anushka Shetty to act as a lead after the films Bhaagamathie and Nishabdham. The cinematography of the film was by Nirav Shah, and the editing was handled by Kotagiri Venkateswara Rao.

== Music ==
Miss. Shetty Mr. Polishetty

Soundtrack album by Radhan
- Released: 2023
- Recorded: 2023
- Genre: Feature film soundtrack
- Length: 18:02
- Language: Telugu
- Label: Aditya Music

Radhan chronology
Sila Nerangalil Sila Manidhargal (2022)	Miss. Shetty Mr. Polishetty (2023)	Siddharth Roy (2024)

Gopi Sundar chronology
Samajavaragamana (2023)	Miss. Shetty Mr. Polishetty (2023)

External audio
- Miss Shetty Mr Polishetty - Jukebox on YouTube

The songs for the film were composed by Radhan, while the background score was composed by Gopi Sundar.

All music is composed by Radhan.

Track listing
No.	Title	Lyrics	Singer(s)	Length
1.	"Lady Luck"	Ramajogayya Sastry	Karthik	2:47
2.	"No No No"	Anantha Sriram	M. M. Manasi, Lady Kash	4:02
3.	"Hathavidi"	Ramajogayya Sastry	Dhanush	3:51
4.	"Dooke Chinuka"	Anantha Sriram	Abby V	2:58
5.	"Ye Vaipuku Saguthondi"	Ramajogayya Sastry	Shankar Mahadevan	4:24
Total length:				18:02

== Release ==
The film was initially scheduled to release on 4 August 2023, but was postponed due to post-production delays. Later, it was released on 7 September 2023 along with dubbed versions in Tamil, Malayalam and Kannada languages. Post-theatrical streaming rights of the film were acquired by Netflix.

== Reception ==
=== Critical reception ===
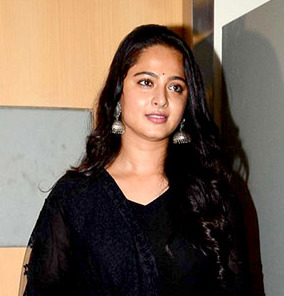
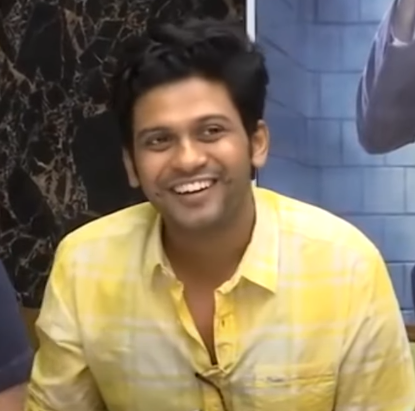
Critics appreciated the performances of the principal cast, Anushka Shetty (left) and Naveen Polishetty (right) receiving praise in particular.

Miss Shetty Mr Polishetty received mixed-to-positive reviews with critics appreciating the performances of Anushka and Naveen in particular. On the review aggregator website Rotten Tomatoes, 60% of 5 critics' reviews are positive, with an average rating of 5.8/10.

Janaki K of IndiaToday gave the film a 3.5/5 and wrote, "Miss Shetty Mr Polishetty is a feel-good romantic drama that hits all the right notes. Sometimes, simplicity is all you need when you watch a film. And ‘Miss Shetty Mr Polishetty’ offers that and much more!". Neeshita Nyayapati of The Times of India gave the film 2.5 out of 5 stars and wrote, "Miss Shetty Mr Polishetty is a good watch if you can't get enough of sweet, simple rom-coms. But it needed more emotional heft to leave a mark." Abhilasha Cherukuri of Cinema Express gave it 2.5 out of 5 stars and wrote, "a decent yet heartfelt romcom that is light without taking things lightly is harder to find than an ideal baby daddy." Sangheeta Devi of The Hindu wrote "Naveen Polishetty's flair for humour and Anushka Shetty's restrained act work but the simple, predictable Miss Shetty Mr Polishetty needed more emotional heft".

=== Box office ===
As of 25 September Miss Shetty Mr Polishetty had a worldwide gross of ₹50 crore (US$5.2 million). The film initially experienced a slow start by just collecting ₹4 crore (US$420,000) on its first day.

=== Accolades ===
Award (Note: Awards, festivals and organizations are in alphabetical order.)	Date of ceremony (Note: Date is linked to the article about the awards held that year, wherever possible.)	Category	Recipient(s)	Result	Ref.
Filmfare Awards South	3 August 2024	Best Film – Telugu	Pramod Uppalapati and V. Vamsi Krishna Reddy	Nominated	
Filmfare Awards South	3 August 2024	Best Actor – Telugu	Naveen Polishetty	Nominated	
Filmfare Awards South	3 August 2024	Best Actress – Telugu	Anushka Shetty	Nominated	
Filmfare Awards South	3 August 2024	Critics Best Actor – Telugu	Naveen Polishetty	Won	
