= Anushka Shetty =

Indian actress (born 1981)

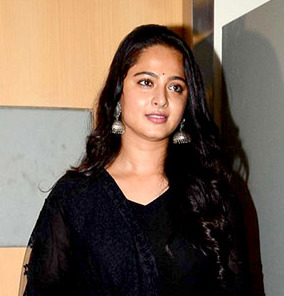
- Shetty in 2016
- Born: Sweety Shetty; 7 November 1981 (age 45); Mangaluru, Dakshina Kannada, Karnataka, India
- Education: Bachelor of Computer Applications; Mount Carmel College, Bangalore
- Occupation: Actress
- Years active: 2005–present
- Works: Full list
- Awards: Full list
- Honours: Kalaimamani (2010)

Signature
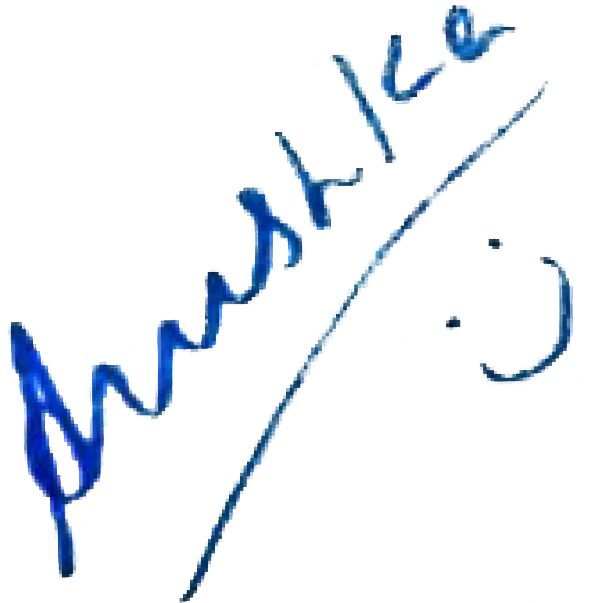

Sweety Shetty (born 7 November 1981), known professionally as Anushka Shetty, is an Indian actress known for her works in Tamil and Telugu films. With a career spanning over two decades as a lead actress in a variety of roles, Shetty is popularly referred to as "Queen of South Indian cinema" in the media. One of the highest-paid actresses in India, she is the recipient of three Filmfare Awards South, two Nandi Awards, two SIIMA Awards and one Tamil Nadu State Film Award. Shetty was honoured with Kalaimamani in 2010 by the Government of Tamil Nadu.

She made her acting debut with the 2005 Telugu film Super, which garnered her a Filmfare Best Supporting Actress – Telugu nomination. The following year, she starred in S. S. Rajamouli's blockbuster hit Vikramarkudu. Her further releases Lakshyam (2007), Souryam (2008), and Chintakayala Ravi (2008) were also box office successes. In 2009, Shetty played dual roles in the Telugu dark fantasy film Arundhati, which led her to her first Filmfare Award for Best Actress – Telugu, and Nandi Award. The following year, Shetty's portrayal of a prostitute in the acclaimed drama Vedam won her a second consecutive Best Actress Award from Filmfare.

In the 2010s, Shetty also starred in Tamil cinema in the action films such as Vettaikaaran (2009), Singam (2010), Singam II (2013), and Yennai Arindhaal (2015), all of which were major commercial successes. She continued to draw praise from critics with her leading performances in the dramas Vaanam (2011), Deiva Thirumagal (2011) and Size Zero (2015). She portrayed the titular queen in the 2015 epic historical fiction Rudhramadevi, which won her the third Filmfare Award for Best Actress – Telugu. Shetty's portrayal of Princess Devasena in the Baahubali series (2015–17) received widespread acclaim.

Shetty debuted in Malayalam with Kathanar – The Wild Sorcerer which marks her 50th film, is expected to release on 2026 second half.

== Early life and education ==
Shetty was born as Sweety Shetty on 7 November 1981 in Mangalore, Karnataka. She is an ethnic Tuluva hailing from a Tulu-speaking Bunt family from Bellipady village in Puttur taluk of Dakshina Kannada district. Her parents are Prafulla and A. N. Vittal Shetty and she has two elder brothers, Gunaranjan Shetty and Sai Ramesh Shetty. Shetty received her Bachelor of Computer Applications from Mount Carmel College in Bangalore. She was also a yoga instructor, trained under Bharat Thakur.

While filming her debut film Super, the director Puri Jagannadh and producer Nagarjuna were keen for Shetty to have a screen name as they felt her real name Sweety may not be appealing to the audience. While mulling over different names, they came across Anushka Manchanda who was singing one of the songs in the film. They liked her first name and decided to adopt Anushka as the screen name for Shetty's film career.

== Career ==
=== Early work and breakthrough (2005–2008) ===
Shetty made her acting debut in 2005 with Puri Jagannadh's Super, where she featured alongside Nagarjuna and Ayesha Takia. Sify stated, "The sexy girls Ayesha and Anushka show off their bodies." For her performance, she earned her first nomination for the Filmfare Award for Best Supporting Actress – Telugu. The same year, she acted in another film Mahanandi, opposite Srihari and Sumanth. IndiaGlitz said, "Anushka looks comely ---and that is what she seems to be in for." but added, "The script has been stitched and the seams look frayed." Sify stated that it "starts promisingly with a racy first half but goes awry and the tempo slackens post interval." and added, "Anushka looks ravishing thanks to Vasu's camera which is a major plus for the film."

In 2006, she had four releases, the first being S. S. Rajamouli's Vikramarkudu, where she was paired with Ravi Teja. Kishore of Nowrunning.com said "The high points of the movie are the flawless acting of Ravi Teja and the lusciousness of Anushka. Anushka has all the assets to that a woman ought to have." and Sify said that Anushka "is definitely a highlight." It was a commercial success. She next starred in the film Astram, a remake of the 1999 Hindi film Sarfarosh, following which she debuted in the Tamil film industry, acting in the Sundar C-directed action flick Rendu, sharing screen space with R. Madhavan. Later that year, she made a special appearance alongside Mega star Chiranjeevi in A. R. Murugadoss' directorial debut in Telugu, Stalin.

Her first release in 2007 was Lakshya which was a success in box office, after which she starred in Raghava Lawrence's Don opposite Nagarjuna again. The former, in particular, succeeded at the box office. In 2008 she had appeared in six films. Okka Magaadu was the first release, in which she played one of three female leads. Nandamuri Balakrishna was the actor opposite her in Okka Magaadu. Her next releases Swagatam alongside Jagapathi Babu and Bhumika Chawla and Baladoor opposite Ravi Teja garnered poor reviews and box office returns. She next appeared in the film Souryam with Gopichand which became a box office hit. Her last release that year was Chintakayala Ravi opposite Venkatesh.

=== Public recognition and widespread success (2009–2010) ===
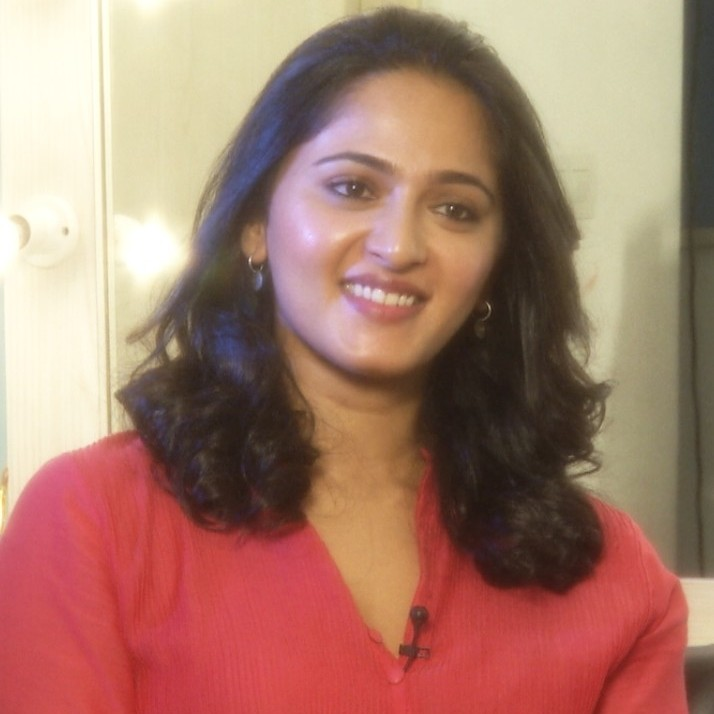
Shetty at an event

In 2009, Shetty first starred in the blockbuster hit, the fantasy film Arundhati. In this heroine-centric film, she essayed two roles for the first time. Idlebrain's Jeevi wrote that she was "simply amazing in two roles" and that she did "exceptionally well with subtle yet impact creating performance," while Rediff.com claimed that she was "brilliant and breathtaking in parts," labelling Arundhati as "totally Anushka's film." Sify noted that she was "at her best with great performance" She went on to win the Nandi Special Jury Award and her first Filmfare Award for Best Actress – Telugu. Her next film was Billa, a remake of the 2007 Tamil film of the same name. The film received mixed reviews, with Rediff stating "Anushka has a super-toned body and indulges in quite a bit of skin show" but had "nothing much to do," while Sify stated "Anushka was there to show her oomph and glamour which she has done full justice." Her final release in 2009 was her second Tamil feature film, the action masala film Vettaikkaran with actor Vijay and it received generally unfavourable reviews. Rediff said, "Anushka, fresh from her success with Arundhathi, has been relegated to pretty bimbette again and appears conveniently during the romantic numbers of which Oru Chinna Thamarai takes the cake." and Sify said, "Anushka has nothing much to do and hence goes unnoticed."

She had a string of releases in 2010. She portrayed a prostitute in Krish's anthology film Vedam which stars Allu Arjun. For her performance, she won her second consecutive Filmfare Award for Best Actress – Telugu. Her next Telugu film, Panchakshari, was another heroine-centric film where she again performed double roles. This was followed by the action comedy Khaleja, where she starred opposite Mahesh Babu for the first time in her career, Nagavalli, the Telugu remake of the Kannada film Aptharakshaka in which she portrayed the famous role of Chandramukhi and Ragada. She also made special appearances in the films Kedi and Thakita Thakita. However all these 2010 releases failed to make an impact at the box office. Her sole Tamil release of 2010, the police drama Singam co-starring Suriya was a major commercial success. Sify claimed, "Anushka is there only for adding glamour and songs, but does a decent job". while Pavithra Srinivasan of Rediff stated, "Anushka, thankfully, has more to do than just prance around in skimpy clothes (which she does very well). She romances dutifully, but her part picks up when both she and Suriya are in Chennai, tangling with villains." Despite its moderate commercial success, Nagavalli earned Anushka her third nomination for the Filmfare Award for Best Actress – Telugu.

=== Expansion to Tamil cinema (2011–2013) ===
She reprised the role she played in Vedam in its Tamil remake, Vaanam (2011). Malathi Rangarajan of The Hindu said, "Boldness and daring mark Anushka's role—the actor's eyes effectively convey joy, helplessness, agony and anger." A critic from Sify wrote that "Anushka is outstanding as the commercial sex worker as she is able to bring out a life-like performance." She next starred in A. L. Vijay's Deiva Thirumagal. The drama centers on the characters of Krishna (Vikram), an intellectually disabled father and his daughter Nila. The film became a critical and commercial success, fetching her laurels for her portrayal as Anuradha, an advocate. Oneindia stated, "Anushka Shetty's character in the film had good scope for performance without being glamorous." For her performance, she won the Vijay Award for Favourite Heroine, in addition to her sole nomination for the Filmfare Award for Best Actress – Tamil.

In 2012, Anushka collaborated again with A. L. Vijay and Vikram in the action drama Thaandavam. Malathi Rangarajan stated that "the romance between Vikram and Anushka is a beautiful feature of Thaandavam." She later appeared alongside Nagarjuna in the fantasy film Damarukam, which was her first Telugu release after two years. Karthik Pasupulate from The Times of India said that Anushka "has little to do as far as performance goes and does a good job of upping the glam quotient." Radhika Rajamani of Rediff claimed, "Anushka looks sweet. Nag and Anushka have good onscreen chemistry." Oneindia claimed, "Anushka Shetty has less scope for acting, but she impresses you in song sequences." She received her fourth nomination for the Filmfare Award for Best Actress – Telugu for her performance in the film.

Shetty's first release in 2013 was Alex Pandian, an action-masala film, directed by Suraj, co-starring Karthi. The film was a critical and commercial failure. Her second release was Koratala Siva's Mirchi opposite Prabhas. Idlebrain.com claimed, "Anushka is adorable in a naughty village belle, the dubbing also seems great and the character Vennela is the best role among her recent roles in films" Rediff wrote, "Anushka is bubbly and peps up the film considerably." Sify wrote, "Anushka looks beautiful and livens up the moments and praised her chemistry with Prabhas." She earned her fifth nomination for the Filmfare Award for Best Actress – Telugu for her performance in Mirchi. She was next seen in Singam II, the sequel to Singam (2010), reprising her role from the first part. Sify said, "Anushka looks jaded, has nothing to do but sizzle with Suriya in two songs" while The Times of India stated, "Anushka is forced to take a back seat even as she reprises her role of Kavya."

Anushka's next release was Selvaraghavan's fantasy adventure film Irandam Ulagam opposite Arya, that saw her playing a dual role again, the third time in her career. Anushka played Ramya, a doctor and Varna, a high spirited, warrior-like character, in a parallel world. Rediff wrote, "Anushka not only shares equal screen space with Arya, but also plays quite a significant role. In fact, the story revolves around her and she has performed admirably." Behindwoods wrote, "As the shy doctor Ramya and as the fierce warrior Varna, Anushka is simply at her best showcasing a wide range of emotions and stunts. It is her performance that stands as a pivot for the rest of the story to take shape."

=== Stardom and further expansion (2014–2017) ===
Her next release was the Tamil film Lingaa opposite Rajinikanth, released in December 2014. She starred opposite Rajnikanth in Lingaa which opened to mixed reviews.

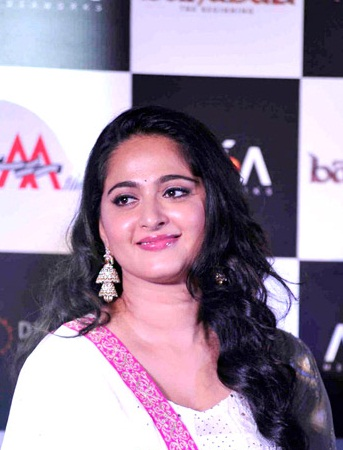
Shetty at promotional event for Baahubali: The Beginning

In 2015, she starred opposite Ajith Kumar in Yennai Arindhaal which opened to positive reviews. Her second release in 2015, is the first part of Baahubali directed by S. S. Rajamouli. She played a warrior princess Devasena, opposite Prabhas. It was a commercial success and became one of the highest grossing Indian film. Shetty was referred to in the media as the "Lady Superstar", post the film release. The Hindu noted "Anushka is gutsy to take on such a role and emotes through her powerful eyes." Her third release that year was Gunashekar's bilingual Rudhramadevi, in which she portrays the title role of the queen of Kakatiya dynasty, Rudrama Devi opposite Allu Arjun and Rana Daggubati. AP Herald wrote, "Anushka is very believable and appreciable as a royal torrid and an honorable woman. Hers is a dual character, that of next to kin 'Rudhradeva' and of powerful 'Rudhramadevi' are superb. She plays her dual role in her characters in style and lends credibility to both the characters." She won her third Filmfare Award for Best Actress – Telugu for her performance in the film. Her final release of the year was Size Zero where she played a plus-sized women. In 2016, she appeared in two cameo appearances in Soggade Chinni Nayana and Oopiri.

Shetty's first film release in 2017 was Si3, in which she was paired with Suriya for the third time in her career. In Om Namo Venkatesaya Shetty portrayed Krishnamma, a Goda Devi or Andal-inspired character. Her next release was Baahubali 2: The Conclusion, where she reprised Devasena. The character of Devasena was highly praised by critics and Shetty's portrayal was equally lauded. A Firstpost article noted that the female characters in the second part were the actual heroes of the saga. Comparing Devasena to Arjuna, the article described her as "a competitive warrior who can wield the bow and arrow with finesse". It further noted how her character emphasized the need of freedom of choice writing that "in Devasena's case by taking archery lessons, choosing her life partner and being given the right to reject a matrimonial alliance, she can be her own person and develop into a strong personality, who doesn't break down even when chained for 25 years in the palace courtyard." She earned her seventh nomination for the Filmfare Award for Best Actress – Telugu for her performance in Baahubali 2: The Conclusion. It was a commercial success and grossed more than the prequel, becoming second highest grossing Indian film. The Baahubali film series firmly established Shetty as a leading South Indian actress.

=== Post-Baahubali and experimental roles (2018–present) ===
In the 2018 film Bhaagamathie, Shetty played the character Chanchala, an IAS officer, who is sent to prison after killing her fiancé. Anushka's portrayal of Bhaagamathie and Chanchala was notable. The News Minute wrote, "There is no woman actor in the south who has the kind of commanding presence that Anushka does. When she's on screen, there's no one else you want to watch. I suppose if I ever met her in person, I'd hear imaginary elephants trumpeting around me because she gets under the skin of these regal roles so convincingly." Praising Shetty's performance it further read, "Anushka alternates between playing the gentle Chanchala and the vengeful Bhaagamathie with ease. This is an actor who can pull off stereotypical depictions of femininity without it grating on your nerves – so when she swoons at the sight of blood in one scene, it doesn't put you off because she takes herself seriously and isn't around just as a decorative festoon." The film earnedher eighth nomination for the Filmfare Award for Best Actress – Telugu for her performance.

In 2019, Shetty appeared in Sye Raa Narasimha Reddy as Rani Lakshmi Bai. In 2020, she played a painter in the bilingual Nishabdham opposite R. Madhavan. Following a three-year hiatus, Shetty played a woman opting for artificial insemination in Miss Shetty Mr Polishetty opposite Naveen Polishetty. The film was a box office success. Janaki K of India Today noted, "Anushka as Anvitha is quite natural in her role and it makes you fall in love all over again." Shetty will next appear in the Telugu film Ghaati, and will make her Malayalam film debut with Kathanar – The Wild Sorcerer, as Kalliyankattu Neeli.

== Awards and nominations ==
Shetty is a recipient of three Filmfare Award for Best Actress – Telugu for her performance in Arundhati, Vedam and Rudhramadevi.
