= Astram (film) =

- Directed by: Suresh Krishna
- Written by: Paruchuri Brothers (Dialogues)
- Story by: John Matthew Matthan
- Based on: Sarfarosh (Hindi) by John Matthew Matthan
- Produced by: Raju Harwani
- Starring: Vishnu Manchu; Anushka Shetty; Jackie Shroff; Rahul Dev
- Cinematography: B. Balamurugan
- Edited by: Gautham Raju
- Music by: S. A. Rajkumar
- Release date: 30 June 2006
- Country: India
- Language: Telugu

Astram (transl. Weapon) is a 2006 Indian Telugu-language action crime film, directed by Suresh Krishna. The film stars Vishnu Manchu, Anushka Shetty, Jackie Shroff and Rahul Dev. It is a remake of the Hindi film Sarfarosh. The film was dubbed into Hindi as Astra - The Weapon and was a disaster at the box office.

== Plot ==
The story starts off by showing gun smuggling and gun running via bags of mirchi (dried red peppers) throughout the country to nefarious dacoits and criminals. Shortly after one group gets their shipment of guns, they block off a road with rocks and stop a wedding bus, kill everyone onboard and rob the jewellery. This Event led the government police department to establish a special task force headed by Hyderabad Crime Branch, ACP Siddharth IPS (Vishnu Manchu). They go to Chittoor (the location of the wedding bus massacre) and set up their own road block and capture some of the criminals/dacoits who were responsible as well as arrest the SI of that area. During interrogation, they get a lead back to Hyderabad, but their superior officer wants them to bring the SI to him before the Press gets wind of this arrest and things get blown out of proportion. While taking the SI to their superior officer, the SI cruelly teases and bullies and gets pushed out the back of the jeep and gets run over by a lorry, and this incident is filed as “an accident”.

Flashback to 4 years ago; Siddharth and Anusha (Anushka Shetty) both attend the same dance class and like each other but neither wants to make the first move to express their love for the other. Siddharth tricks Anusha into expressing that she has feelings for him, but he fails to show up as promised that evening and is absent for the next four years.

Back to the present, Khadar Vali, a.k.a. “KV” (Jackie Shroff), is a singer who has been invited back to the dance/song school to put on presentations. During an outing, Siddharth realizes that he is being followed, but brainless jabber mouth Anusha, not believing that Siddharth is an ACP, confronts the tail and nearly screws up the arrest that Siddharth had planned with his team. The perp gets stabbed in the police van before he could spill any information.

Another flashback by Siddharth to Karim (Rahul Dev) shows why he was MIA for four years and spent that time doing IPS and became an ACP... his father had his neck broken is in bad health; as a result, his sister-in-law is a widow because her husband was murdered, and his uncle has sacrificed everything in his life to help the family cope with their troubles. All these troubles came to happen because the Police were working with the criminal and immediately intimated that a witness (Siddharth's father played by Sarath Babu) had come forward to identify and testify against him. The criminal and his gang went after Siddharth's father and, in the process, killed Siddharth's brother.

Back to the present, the task force uses the information in the dead criminal's cell phone that they captured to find when and where the next consignment of illegal weapons will come through and stake out the place in the hopes of capturing it and the criminal smugglers. They find that Pulla Rao is one of the smugglers, and shortly after he appears, a lorry containing a large shipment of illegal firearms shows and the bags of mirchi are offloaded onto various jeeps for further distribution. While trying to apprehend Pulla Rao, a shootout ensues. Karim arrives to help out, but Pulla Rao and his goons get away, and Siddharth breaks his leg.

Back in Rameswaram, the leader of the smuggling ring gets a phone call reporting that their entire shipment was seized, but Pulla Rao and Sardar managed to avoid capture. It is then revealed that the ring leader is none other than Khadar Vali, aka KV (Jackie Shroff), who is now under pressure from his clients not just for more weapons that they have paid for but also for ammunition that is running low (ammunition was also seized). They also try to bribe Siddharth, and if he doesn't take the bribe and stay out of their business, then they will kill him. After fighting off the smuggler, Siddharth uses Karim's help to navigate a facial construction software to create an image of his attacker and distribute that to all police stations to see if they can get an ID on the culprit. During the scuffle at the dhaba where they seized the large shipment, Siddharth remembers that something came out of one of the smuggler's bag and flew into the underbrush. He goes back to the dhaba and traces out his steps, and finds Sardhar’s horoscope. They use this information to backtrace where Sardhar probably lives and, therefore, the point of origin of where the illegal weapons are entering the country and think that it is Rameswaram. There, KV finds out that the ACP he was looking for was actually Siddharth.

Siddharth and his team raid the next shipment and capture and start interrogating Bullet Basha (a higher up in the smuggling ring) for information but is called off for a school function that his nephew is part of. At the school function, Siddharth's dad recognizes the swastika tattoo on the forearm of the criminal that broke his neck and caused the death of his son (Siddharth's brother), and it is none other than the current DGP. At this time, the team also finds out that all the weapons that were seized are now missing from evidence, and when Siddharth offers to go and investigate the disappearance, the DGP overrules him and says that he will do it personally. The only evidence left at the scene is a handkerchief with the initials “PD”, so Karim uses a sniffer dog, and the dog goes straight at the DGP, confirming Siddharth's suspicions.

The DGP surreptitiously arranges for Siddharth's nephew to be kidnapped for exchange for Bullet Basha (trade). After rescuing his nephew, Siddharth tries a new number that they retrieved and finds out that the real culprit (kingpin) is none other than KV himself. The team of six decide to try a near-suicide attempt to stop the latest shipment. At the end, Siddharth plays KV against DGP and gives them both the opportunity to kill the other before the other kills them, but only one gun (the one given to KV) had a bullet in it, and so the DGP dies. After a fiery speech by Siddharth admonishing KV for his actions and pitting Hindu vs. Muslim, Karim handcuffs KV, but KV has different ideas than to be taken to prison and so impales himself on the bayonet of an officer's rifle and thereby committing suicide.

At the end of the movie, the team comes to meet Siddharth to inform him that another bus atrocity similar to the one in the beginning of the movie, just occurred. Still, the difference is that the culprits were using entirely new types of weapons, suggesting that there is now a new smuggling ring and a new leader to chase down.

== Cast ==
- Vishnu Manchu as ACP Siddharth IPS, Crime Branch, Hyderabad
- Anushka Shetty as Anusha
- Teja Sajja as Teja
- Jackie Shroff as Khadar Vali
- Rahul Dev as Karim
- Sumalatha as Rajya Lakshmi, Siddharth's mother
- Sarath Babu as Panduranga Rao, Siddharth's father
- Paruchuri Venkateswara Rao as Mirchi Mallaiyya
- Giri Babu as Rama Chandra Murthy
- Ravi Prakash as Siddharth's colleague
- Prabhu as Siddharth's colleague
- Raghu Babu as Mirchi Malai's assistant
- Rallapalli
- Sirisha as Siddharth's sister-in-law
- Gundu Hanumantha Rao
- Visweswara Rao
- Potti Rambabu (Rabhas) as Khadar Vali's servant
- Ravali in item number

== Production ==
It was initially reported that Nukarapu Surya Prakash Rao was going to produce the film before he was replaced by Raju Harwani. The muhurat shot was held at Annapurna Studios on 11 November 2005 with Nandamuri Balakrishna and Sania Mirza in attendance. Jackie Shroff plays a carnatic musician in the film.

== Soundtrack ==
The music was composed by S. A. Rajkumar.

No.	Song	Singers	Lyrics	Length (m:ss)
1	"Muddu Muddu"	Anuradha Sriram, Tippu	Bhaskarabhatla	04:32
2	"Padahare"	Roshini, Shreya Ghoshal	Bhuvana Chandra	05:09
3	"Sakhiya"(Version l)	Karunya, Shivani	Bhuvana Chandra	05:02
4	"Undipo Nesthama"	K. S. Chithra, Rajesh	Suddala Ashok Teja	04:15
5	"Prema Kanna"	Ananthu, Rajesh	Veturi Sundara Ramamurhty	05:23
6	"Raa Chilaka"	Shankar Mahadevan, Sujatha	Bhaskarabhatla	04:46
7	"Sakhiya"(Version ll)	Hariharan, Shivani	Bhuvana Chandra	05:02
