= Kathanar – The Wild Sorcerer =

Upcoming Indian period fantasy film

- Theatrical release poster
- Directed by: Rojin Thomas
- Written by: R. Ramanand; Rojin Thomas
- Produced by: Gokulam Gopalan
- Starring: Jayasurya; Anushka Shetty; Prabhu Deva; Vineeth; Nitish Bharadwaj
- Cinematography: Neil D'Cunha
- Edited by: Rojin Thomas
- Music by: Rahul Subrahmanian
- Production company: Sree Gokulam Movies
- Distributed by: Sree Gokulam Movies
- Country: India
- Language: Malayalam
- Budget: ₹75–100 crore

Kathanar – The Wild Sorcerer is an upcoming Indian Malayalam-language period fantasy thriller film directed and edited by Rojin Thomas, who also co-wrote the screenplay with R. Ramanand. It was produced by Gokulam Gopalan through Sree Gokulam Movies. The plot follows Kadamattathu Kathanar, a legendary 9th century Christian priest endowed with magical powers. The film stars Jayasurya in the title role, alongside Anushka Shetty (in her Malayalam debut and 50th film appearance), Prabhu Deva, Sanoop Santhosh, Devika Sanjay, Sandy, Harish Uthaman, Vineeth, and Nitish Bharadwaj.

The film is intended to be the first of a two-part film. Principal photography began in April 2023. The film was shot using the virtual production technology in a custom-built studio.

== Cast ==
- Jayasurya as Kadamattathu Kathanar
- Anushka Shetty as Nila
- Prabhu Deva as Virtuoso
- Sanoop Santhosh
- Devika Sanjay
- Sandy
- Harish Uthaman
- Vineeth
- Nitish Bharadwaj
- Srikant Murali
- Anant Murali
- Dhanasree Sudhakaran
- Ashwin Sajeev
- Kottayam Ramesh
- Kiran Aravindakshan
- Kulpreet Yadav
- Mohanlal as Mar Abo (cameo appearance)

== Production ==
=== Development ===
The film is based on the story of legendary 9th-century Christian priest Kadamattathu Kathanar. The film was initially planned to be produced by Vijay Babu of Friday Film House, with whom Rojin Thomas had previously collaborated in two films. However, in March 2020, it was announced that the project has been taken over by Gokulam Gopalan of Sree Gokulam Movies. It was also reported that the film would be released in two parts and is mounted on a budget of ₹75 crore. According to Rojin, the film falls under "period fantasy thriller" genre. Pre-production began in September 2021.

=== Filming ===
Principal photography began on 5 April 2023 in Kochi. It was held at a custom-built studio spanning 45,000 square feet (4,200 m^{2}), utilizing virtual production technology. The first schedule was completed on 2 June 2023 after 43 days. Around 570 personnel worked in various departments.

Principal photography was completed in October 2024, after 212 days of shoot over 18 months. Still, 12-day shoot was remaining in Rome.

== Release ==
Alongside the original Malayalam version, the makers are planning to release the film in multiple dubbed languages, including Tamil, Telugu, Kannada, Bengali, Chinese, French, Korean, Italian, Russian, Indonesian, Japanese, German, Hindi and English.
