= Mahanandi (film) =

- Theatrical Release poster
- Directed by: V. Samudra
- Written by: Polur Ghatikachalam
- Produced by: Anasuya Devi
- Starring: Sumanth; Anushka Shetty; Srihari; Suman; Kota Srinivasa Rao
- Cinematography: Vasu
- Edited by: Nandamuri Hari
- Music by: Kamalakar
- Distributed by: RS Movie Productions
- Release date: 3 December 2005
- Country: India
- Language: Telugu

Mahanandi is a 2005 Indian Telugu-language action drama film, directed by V. Samudra, starring Sumanth, Anushka Shetty and Srihari in the Lead. The movie was released on 3 December 2005. It was a moderate success at the box office. It was dubbed into Hindi as Ek aur Mahayudh, in Tamil as Thirupachi Aruva and into Malayalam under the title Ullasam.

== Plot ==
Swamy leaves Rayalaseema along with his sister during their childhood after their parents are murdered by a rival faction. Swamy later takes his revenge, and becomes a powerful don when he grows up. Bhaskar, the eventual leader of the rival faction group, operates from Charlapally jail, and his main aim is to kill Swamy.

Shankar is an orphan raised by Swamy, and grows up to become the latter's body guard and right-hand man. Without asking for her consent, Swamy settles his sister Nandini's marriage with the son of Naayar. Nandini doesn't like this proposal and plans to get out of it. She lies to Shankar, saying that she wants to marry the man she loves, Kumar. She seeks Shankar's help to escape from home. Shankar, in a fix, reluctantly agrees. Before escaping, Nandini writes a letter to Swamy, saying that she is actually in love with Shankar, and that they are eloping. This letter creates a rift between Shankar and Swamy, who feels betrayed. Later, Nandini reveals to Shankar that she is actually in love with him, and not Kumar. Shankar is shocked. Meanwhile, Bhaskar tries to take advantage of the rift between Swamy and Shankar and plans his attack. During their time together, Shankar too gradually falls in love with Nandini. Eventually, Swami and Shankar come together and fight Bhaskar. They finally reconcile, but Swami succumbs to his injuries. Shankar and Nandini marry and eventually have a son, whom they name Swami.

== Cast ==
- Sumanth as Shankar
- Anushka Shetty as Nandini
- Srihari as Swami
- Suman as Police Inspector
- Sai Kiran as Kumar
- Kota Srinivasa Rao as Nayar
- Prasanna Kumar
- Subbaraju
- Chittajalu Lakshmipati as Saidulu
- A. V. S. as lecturer
- L. B. Sriram as Shriram
- Venu Madhav as Anand
- Kovai Sarala as Chilakamma
- Kausalya as Swami's wife
- Seetha as Swami's mother
- Payal Rohatgi in item song Champakamaala
- Abhinayashree in item song Champakamaala
- Alphonsa in item song Champakamaala

== Soundtrack ==
Maha Nandi

Soundtrack album to Maha Nandi by Kamalakar
- Released: 31 October 2005
- Recorded: 2005
- Genre: Feature film soundtrack
- Language: Telugu
- Label: Madhura Entertainment
- Producer: Kamalakar

the soundtrack was composed by Kamalakar. The audio of Mahanandi was released by Venkatesh at a function arranged in Fortune Katriya Hotel. Madhura Entertainments label distributed and marketed the audio. Sumanth could not attend the function as he was shooting for his other film, Godavari, near Rajahmundry.

Song title	Singers	Lyricist
"Yemainaa"	K. S. Chithra, Hariharan	Bandaru Danayya Kavi
"Tightgunna Jeans Pantu"	Tippu	Taidala Bapu
"Indradhanassu"	Shreya Ghoshal	Eeshwar Teja
"Etu Choosthe Atu Nuvve"	K. S. Chithra	Velpula Venkatesh
"Champakamaala"	Malathi, Shankar Mahadevan	Bhaskarabhatla
"Naa Panchapranaalu"	K. S. Chithra, S. P. Balasubrahmanyam	Gurucharan
"Kathilaanti Ammayi"	Adnan Sami, Sujatha	Veturi
