= Avilanji =

Avalanchi "Avalanche OR Avilanji"
- Village
- Location in Tamil Nadu, India Avalanchi (India)
- Coordinates: 11.31°N 76.62°E
- Country: India
- State: Tamil Nadu
- District: Nilgiris
- Elevation: 2,401 m (7,877 ft)

Languages
  - Official: Tamil
- Time zone: UTC+5:30 (IST)
- PIN: 643***
- Telephone code: 04262
- Vehicle registration: TN-43

Avalanchi is a village at taluk in Nilgiris district in the Indian state of Tamil Nadu. It is said that Avalanchi gets its name from, The word may conjure up the image of disaster, but Avalanche (pronounced Avalanchi by locals) is a gorgeous little spot in the hills, its rolling meadows and winding paths full of bright rhododendrons, magnificent magnolias and delicate orchids. This pristine valley, about 26 km from Udhagamandalam, gets its name from a massive landslide that took place here more than 150 years ago.

== Hydro-Electric Power House ==
Kundah Power House 5 is located at Avalanche, 18 km from Kundah. There are 2 units and the installed capacity of the power house is 40MW. The water source for the power house is Western Catchment Dam 1 and Upper Bhavani Dam and its Forebay Capacity is 700 Cusec.

== Tourist attractions ==
Trout fishing can be enjoyed in this lake by making use of the fishing rods and other important equipment. The Trout Farm near the Avalanche Dam is famous for trout fishes, which breeds in unpolluted water.

== Transportation Links ==
Avalanchi is linked by Nilgiri Ghat Roads.
