= Vedam (film) =

2010 film by Krish

- Theatrical release poster
- Directed by: Krish Jagarlamudi
- Written by: Krish Jagarlamudi
- Produced by: Shobu Yarlagadda; Prasad Devineni
- Starring: Allu Arjun; Manchu Manoj; Anushka Shetty; Manoj Bajpayee; Saranya Ponvannan; Nagayya; Deeksha Seth; Lekha Washington
- Cinematography: Gnana Shekar V. S.
- Edited by: Shravan Katikaneni
- Music by: M. M. Keeravani
- Production company: Arka Media Works
- Distributed by: Sri Venkateswara Creations
- Release date: 4 June 2010
- Running time: 135 minutes
- Country: India
- Language: Telugu

Vedam (transl. Chant) is a 2010 Indian Telugu-language hyperlink drama film written and directed by Krish, and produced by Shobu Yarlagadda and Prasad Devineni under their banner Arka Media Works. The film features an ensemble cast consisting of Allu Arjun, Manchu Manoj, Anushka Shetty, Manoj Bajpayee, Saranya Ponvannan, Nagayya, Deeksha Seth, and Lekha Washington. M. M. Keeravani composed the music while Gnana Shekar V. S. did the cinematography.

Vedam follows the lives of five main characters whose paths cross on a New Year’s Eve at a hospital in Hyderabad. The film released on 4 June 2010, where it was critically acclaimed and won multiple awards, including four Filmfare Awards (Best Film, Best Director, Best Actor and Best Actress). Film Companion included Vedam in their list of 25 Greatest Telugu Films Of The Decade. Krish later remade the film in Tamil as Vaanam (2011).

== Plot ==
Vivek Chakravarthy is an aspiring rockstar from Bengaluru who hails from a family of decorated army officers. While his mother wants him to join the army, Vivek dreams of music. On the eve of his first major concert in Hyderabad, he misses his flight and travels with his band by road. Along the way, their tire deflates, leaving him and his bandmate Lasya alone. They are attacked by a fanatic group but manage to escape with the help of a truck driver. After a minor accident in Hyderabad, they rush a pregnant woman to the hospital.

Saroja, a prostitute from Amalapuram, dreams of escaping her abusive employer Rattamma. With her friend Karpooram, a eunuch, she plans to flee to Hyderabad. After betraying the local sub-inspector Bullebbayi by drugging him, she manages to escape, only to find herself betrayed again by a broker in Hyderabad. After a scuffle, Karpooram is stabbed, and the duo ends up at the same hospital as Vivek and Lasya, seeking medical help.

Ramulu, a debt-ridden weaver from Sircilla, is struggling to pay off a loan that has led to his grandson’s captivity. He and his daughter-in-law Padma are desperate to save the child and come to Hyderabad, where Padma agrees to sell her kidney. Ramulu has already sold his own kidney in the past. At the same hospital where the others are, Padma’s kidney is sold for ₹1,00,000, though Ramulu only receives ₹37,000.

Rahimuddin Qureshi, from Old Basti in Hyderabad, is deeply scarred by the miscarriage of his wife during a violent religious scuffle. He plans to leave the country, but on the night of his farewell, the police arrest him and his nephews, alleging terrorist links. Rahim's nephew confesses to a terrorist connection, and Rahim is left trapped in the police station. While being transported to remand, Rahim tries to escape but is shot. He ends up at the hospital, alongside the other characters.

Anand Raj, known as Cable Raju, is a poor cable operator from the Jubilee Hills slum. He dreams of impressing Pooja, an upper-class girl, who does not know about his financial struggles. To gain entry into an expensive New Year’s party, Raju steals money by snatching chains from women. However, after a run-in with the police and a run-in with Saroja, Raju realizes his mistake when he steals money from Ramulu and later returns it, adding his own savings to make up for the theft.

At the hospital, the five characters’ lives collide when a group of terrorists, holding Rahim hostage, free their leader. The terrorists start their attack, and chaos ensues. Vivek and Raju try to save as many people as possible, even killing two terrorists in the process. Rahim, seeking redemption, saves his former enemy Shivaram and helps thwart the attack. In their final moments, Raju and Vivek heroically sacrifice their lives to protect the innocent.

In the aftermath, Saroja decides to leave her profession, and Vivek is posthumously hailed as a national hero. Raju’s death is mourned, but he earns respect, with Pooja visiting his grave. Rahim is freed by Shivaram, who recognizes his heroism. Ramulu's landlord tries to deceive him about the money owed, but Ramulu’s grandson proves the payment is complete, and they are finally freed.

== Cast ==
- Allu Arjun as Anand Raj a.k.a. "Cable" Raju
- Manoj Manchu as Vivek Chakravarti
- Anushka Shetty as Saroja (voice over by Jyothi Varma)
- Manoj Bajpayee as Rahimuddin Qureshi (Voice dubbed by Aziz Naser)
- Nagayya as Ramulu
- Saranya Ponvannan as Padma
- Deeksha Seth as Pooja (voice dubbed by Anasuya Bharadwaj)
- Lekha Washington as Lasya
- Ravi Prakash as ACP Shivaram
- Seiya Gautam as Zara
- Satyam Rajesh as Ganapati
- Brahmanandam as Brother Bairagi
- Posani Krishna Murali as Police Inspector
- Raghu Babu as Dappu Subani
- Nikki as Karpooram
- Prudhviraj as Bullebbayi
- Nagineedu as Terrorist
- Kalpa Latha
- Pramila Rani as Raju's mother
- Sandhya Janak as Vivek's mother
- Giridhar as Koti
- Rakesh Varre as Terrorist’s assistant
- Krish as a sadhu in a cameo appearance in the song "Rupayi"

== Production ==
=== Development ===
Director Krish had a visual of an old man walking along with a child in his dreams. However, he felt it as too arty to make a film and also the story was not complete. One day while travelling from Guntur to Hyderabad, he narrated the story of Nagayya (initially he named it Jalayya) to cinematographer Gnana Sekhar, who also worked with him in Gamyam. The second story initially he conceptualised was about a film crew and later changed it to music band. The title of Vedam struck him when he was writing the story at Sirivennela's home. The climax of the film was an inspiration from 26/11 Mumbai blasts in Taj Hotel. After getting a basic storyline he decided to produce Vedam on his banner First Frame Entertainment, before producers Shobu Yarlagadda and Prasad Devineni decided to finance it.

=== Casting ===
Krish wanted to do the character of Karpooram, but decided against it after his mother warned him that doing so will affect his marital life. Later, when discussing the story with Anushka Shetty, she suggested her personal make-up person Nikki for the role and Krish liked him. Anushka reduced her remuneration by 30% as the film was a low budget production. Rahimuddin Qureshi (the character played by Manoj Bajpai) is the name of Krish's best friend in intermediate. Newcomer Nagayya was cast in the film. The five principal characters were based on the five natural elements-Water, Air, Earth, Fire and Sky. Manoj Manchu revealed that his character doesn't meet Allu Arjun's character till the climax.

== Music ==
Vedam

Soundtrack album by M. M. Keeravani
- Released: May 2010
- Recorded: 2010
- Genre: Telugu
- Label: Vel Records
- Producer: M. M. Keeravani

M. M. Keeravani chronology
Rama Rama Krishna Krishna (2010)	Vedam (2010)	Jhummandi Naadam (2010)

The film's music was composed by M. M. Keeravani while the lyrics were written by Sirivennela Seetarama Sastry, Sahiti, E. S. Murthy and M. M. Keeravani The audio was released in the presence of notable Telugu film personalities on 3 May 2010.

Tracks 9 to 12 of the soundtrack were only made available on the official Digital release and not the physical CD.

Track #	Song	Artist(s)
1	"Now or Never"	Benny Dayal, Geeta Madhuri and Deepu
2	"Egiripothe Entha Baguntundi"	Sunitha, Geetha Madhuri and M. M. Keeravani
3	"Rupai"	M. M. Keeravani
4	"Prapancham Naaventa Vasthunte"	Allu Arjun, Anuj Gurwara, Achu, Rahul and Chaitra H. G.
5	"Malli Puttani"	M. M. Keeravani
6	"Emi Tellisi Nannu Mohisthivi"	Padma, Poornima, Manju and Sudha Krishnan
7	"Vedam"	Karthik
8	"Ee Chikati Cherani"	M. M. Keeravani
9	"Alalai Kammani Kalali"	ES Murthy
10	"Nuvumundhani Nemundhani"	Kaala Bhairava
11	"Caterpillar"	M. M. Keeravani
12	"Oneness"	M. M. Keeravani

== Marketing ==
Vedam notably had no promotional activities since the film's launch in 2010. The first activity happened just before the music launch, by releasing the wallpaper masking the main actors and highlighting the film's title at www.idlebrain.com. After the film's music launch, the wallpaper was re-released by revealing the actors. The film was given A certificate because of violence and Anushka's character by CBFC for video release.

== Critical reception ==
The Times of India gave a review stating "After watching contrived plots and stereotype protagonists, this path-breaking movie arrives like a breath of fresh air. Undeniably, it's another inspiring film from the maker of Gamyam." Rediff gave a review stating "Vedam is a must-watch for its story, screenplay, direction and technicalities. It offers hope to the audience interested in good and sensible cinema that such a film can be made in Telugu. Vedam is a beautiful confluence of writing and technical aspects. It has set a benchmark in Telugu cinema." idlebrain.com gave a review stating "Vedam is a good film. Please watch it and encourage good/meaningful cinema. This film will be liked by classes and A center audiences. If masses and B/C centers patronage Vedam, it will not only do good to the film but to the entire Telugu film industry."

== Awards ==
Nandi Awards of 2010

- Best Feature Film - Gold - Shobu Yarlagadda
- Special Jury Award - Nagayya

58th Filmfare Awards South

- Best Film – Shobu Yarlagadda & Prasad Devineni
- Best Director – Krish
- Best Actor – Allu Arjun
- Best Actress – Anushka Shetty

Nominations

- Best Music Director - M. M. Keeravani
- Best Female Playback Singer - Sunitha - "Egiripothe Entha Baguntundi"
- Best Lyricist - Sirivennela Sitaramasastri - "Now or Never"

2011 CineMAA Awards

- Best Actress (Jury) – Anushka Shetty
- Best Director (Jury) – Krish
- Special Jury – Nagayya

Awards
Preceded by Magadheera	Filmfare Best Film Award (Telugu); 2010	Succeeded by Dookudu
