= Nagavalli (film) =

2010 film by P. Vasu

- Theatrical release poster
- Directed by: P. Vasu
- Written by: Paruchuri brothers Gowtam Raju
- Screenplay by: P. Vasu
- Story by: P. Vasu
- Based on: Aptharakshaka
- Produced by: Bellamkonda Suresh
- Starring: Venkatesh; Anushka Shetty
- Cinematography: Shyam K. Naidu
- Edited by: Marthand K Venkatesh
- Music by: Gurukiran
- Production company: Sri Sai Ganesh Productions
- Release date: 16 December 2010
- Running time: 159 minutes
- Country: India
- Language: Telugu

Nagavalli is a 2010 Indian Telugu-language comedy horror film written and directed by P. Vasu. It is produced by Bellamkonda Suresh on Sri Sai Ganesh Productions. The film stars Venkatesh, and Anushka Shetty in the lead roles. It has music composed by Gurukiran. The film is a remake of the director's 2010 Kannada film Aptharakshaka and serves as a spin-off to his 2005 Tamil film Chandramukhi, which was an official remake of the Malayalam film Manichitrathazhu (1993).

== Plot ==
An ancient painting of Chandramukhi, alias Nagavalli, is distributed as a prize to Bharatanatyam dancer Gayathri, her husband, and her family. Gayathri lives in Tirupathi with her husband, father Shankar Rao, mother Parvathi, sisters Geetha who tries to repaint the original portrait of Chandramukhi as a part of her painting hobby, and Gowri, maternal uncle Appa Rao, his wife, and maternal cousins Pooja and Hema.

A few years later, Gayathri and her husband are shown to be dead. Gowri, the youngest of the three sisters is engaged to be married and on the day of the wedding, one of her friends faints upon encountering a huge snake, and the bridegroom gets superstitious and calls off the wedding after fearing something. The members of the family are affected by the presence of Chandramukhi's painting. so they contact Acharya Ramchandra Siddhanthi. Acharya takes the help of Dr. Vijay, a psychiatrist, and assistant to Dr. Sarvanan/Eshawar to solve the problem. All signs point to the portrait of Chandramukhi to be the cause of the problems in the Rao household. The Acharya says that it is the same painting that has resurfaced from Ganga's house, where Vijay's mentor Dr. Sarvanan/Eshawar, and the Acharya had first come across this problem and solved it five years ago. One night, Dr. Vijay goes to the outhouse as he hears anklet sounds and finds that Gayathri is still alive but became mentally disturbed after the accident in which her husband died. It is revealed that the family decided to hide Gayathri from the public, fearing that Geetha and Gowri would not get prospective suitors for marriage. Suspecting that Gayathri is the one possessed by Chandramukhi, the Rao family along with Vijay and the Acharya, take her to a nearby temple where they find strange paranormal occurrences but fail to exorcise her.

Vijay investigates the history of Chandramukhi. It takes him back to around 125 years when a king, Raja Sri Sri Sri Nagabhairava Rajshekhara had chanced upon a beautiful dancer Chandramukhi, also known as Nagavalli. Vijay learns that it was Nagabhairava who usurped wealth and kidnapped Chandramukhi from a Tamil kingdom. Nagabhairava is smitten by Chandramukhi, but before he could do anything about it, he finds her with her lover Gunashekharan and in a fit of rage beheads Gunashekaran and burns Chandramukhi alive who before dying vows to kill the latter. Chandramukhi's spirit roams in the palace and Nagbhairava has nightmares who then with the help of priests and sorcerers from all over the country captures Chandramukhi's spirit and locks it in her room. The sorcerer advises the king that the door should never get opened again else her spirit will be freed and the problem will restart. He also orders that any virgin woman in his kingdom should be exiled or he would kill them. But his subordinates and the people of his kingdom gather against Nagabhairava and plot to assassinate him for all his wrongdoings. Nagabhairava escapes and no one knew whether he was alive or dead. 100 years later, it was Ganga who opened Chandramukhi's room and freed her spirit. On the day, Acharya exorcised Ganga, Chandramukhi's room was open and she fled in guise of a serpent to her home town Thanjavur. Vijay also finds that someone else is also investigating the history of Chandramukhi and learns that it could be the woman who is possessed by Chandramukhi. Vijay finds that Nagabhairava is still alive with his astrological profile and deduces that he might be living like a sage using black magic. His assumptions are right when he finds the old and crumpled Raja alive in a cave. Meanwhile, the Acharya still believes that Gayathri is the possessed woman and tries to exorcise her with pooja and mantras. Vijay tells that she isn't possessed but is just mentally disturbed and cures her post-traumatic disorder successfully and reveals to everyone that Gowri is the one affected by Chandramukhi and proves it. They find that Gowri was in a fragile mental state due to Gayathri's trauma and a close friend's death and did research about people who live longer than normal when she came across the legend of Chandramukhi and Nagabhairava and empathizes with their story. To learn more about Chandramukhi, Gowri went to Tanjawur. Upon reaching Chandramukhi's house, Chandramukhi's spirit possesses Gowri. When Gayathri was asleep, a possessed Gowri dances in grief of Gunashekharan, while the Rao family mistakes it to be Gayathri. Vijay tells a possessed Gowri (Chandramukhi) that Nagabhairava is still alive and sees her transforming into a rage-filled Chandramukhi. She goes to the cave to kill Nagabhairava. Vijay follows her where they have a battle with him, and as Nagabhairava uses his sword to behead Chandramukhi, a bolt of lightning strikes the sword, and it reduces him to ashes. Chandramukhi leaves Gowri as she gets her revenge and finally everyone is at peace.

== Cast ==
- Venkatesh in dual role as
  - Sri Sri Sri Naga Bhairava Rajshekhara
  - Dr. Vijay - Dr. Eshwar's student.
- Anushka Shetty as Chandramukhi alias Nagavalli
- Richa Gangopadhyay as Gowri (possessed by Nagavalli)
- Kamalinee Mukherjee as Gayathri
- Shraddha Das as Geetha
- Sarath Babu as Shankar Rao - Gowri, Gayathri and Geetha's father.
- Avinash as Acharya Ramachandra Siddhanthi
- Brahmanandam as Seenu
- Dharmavarapu Subramanyam as Appa Rao
- Poonam Kaur as Pooja
- Suja Varunee as Hema
- Vamsi Krishna as the groom who was to marry Gowri
- M. S. Narayana as Snake Charmer who died because of cardiac arrest
- Prabha as Parvathi Devi
- Chalapathi Rao
- Surya Rao as Gunashekharan (Chandramukhi's lover)
- Sumitra
- Sameer as Sura Simha
- Raksha as Lakshmi Devi
- Sana
- Saira Banu
- Lahari
- Anithanath
- Sandhya Janak
- Bhavana
- Kalpana
- Madhumita
- Sravani
- Sirisha
- Glory
- Rajinikanth as Dr. Eshwar, Dr. Vijay's mentor (uncredited, only photo shown)
- Jyothika as Ganga Kailash (uncredited, archival footage from Chandramukhi)

== Production ==
The film was initially titled Chandramukhi 2.

== Soundtrack ==
Nagavalli

Soundtrack album by Guru Kiran
- Released: 16 November 2010
- Genre: Film soundtrack
- Length: 26:07
- Label: Aditya Audio (Telugu); Sangeet Music (Hindi & Tamil)

Music composed by Guru Kiran. Lyrics written by Chandrabose. Music released on Aditya Music Company. Nagavalli's soundtrack was released on 16 November 2010 at Shilpakala Vedika, Hyderabad. The audio launch was attended by D. Ramanaidu, Rajamouli, Puri Jagannadh, VV Vinayak, Rana, Nani, Ileana, Praneetha, KL Narayana and other film celebrities, along with Nagavalli's cast and crew. Tunes were retained from Kannada for the songs Ghirani Ghirani and Omkara.

Telugu
| No. | Title | Singer(s) | Length |
|---|---|---|---|
| 1. | "Abhimani Lenide" | S. P. Balasubrahmanyam | 4:46 |
| 2. | "Vandanalu Vandanalu" | Rajesh Krishnan, Nanditha, Shamita Malnad | 4:55 |
| 3. | "Ghirani Ghirani" | S. P. Balasubrahmanyam | 5:01 |
| 4. | "Khelo Khelo" | Ranjith, Jogi Sunitha | 4:00 |
| 5. | "Omkara" | Chitra | 3:21 |
| 6. | "Ra Ra Remix" | Nithyashree Mahadevan, Sri Charan | 3:45 |
| Total length: | | | 26:07 |

Tamil (Dubbed Version)
| No. | Title | Singer(s) | Length |
|---|---|---|---|
| 1. | "Rasike Linena" | S. P. Balasubrahmanyam | 4:46 |
| 2. | "Ghiragi Ghiragi" | S. P. Balasubrahmanyam | 5:01 |
| 3. | "Kabadi Kabadi" | Ranjith, Jogi Sunitha | 4:00 |
| 4. | "Omkara" | Chitra | 3:21 |
| 5. | "Ra Ra 2.0" | Binny Krishnakumar, Tipu Ranjith, Sunitha, Rajesh Nanditha, Shamita Malnad, S. P. Balasubrahmanyam, K. S. Chitra, Nithyashree Mahadevan, Sri Charan | 3:45 |

== Reception ==
Nagavalli Received mixed reviews from critics and audience.

idlebrain.com gave a review of rating 3/5 stating "The plus points of the film are Venkatesh and Chandramukhi's premise. On the flip side, a better screenplay and an exciting climax would have helped the movie. We have to wait and see how the crowds respond to this sequel to Chandramukhi."

== Box office ==
Nagavalli collected more than ₹10 crore in its opening week.
