= Bhaagamathie =

2018 Indian film by G. Ashok

- Telugu version release poster
- Directed by: G. Ashok
- Written by: G. Ashok
- Dialogues by: R. Santhosh (Tamil); Ravindra Madhava (Tamil)
- Produced by: V. Vamsi Krishna Reddy; Pramod Uppalapati
- Starring: Anushka Shetty; Unni Mukundan; Murali Sharma; Asha Sarath; Jayaram
- Cinematography: R. Madhi
- Edited by: Kotagiri Venkateswara Rao
- Music by: S. Thaman
- Production company: UV Creations
- Distributed by: Studio Green
- Release date: 26 February 2018
- Running time: 135 minutes
- Country: India
- Languages: Telugu; Tamil
- Budget: ₹25 crore
- Box office: est.₹67.20 crore

Bhaagamathie is a 2018 Indian horror thriller film written and directed by G. Ashok. The film stars Anushka Shetty in the title role with Unni Mukundan, Jayaram (in his Telugu debut), Murali Sharma, and Asha Sarath play other pivotal roles. Produced in Telugu cinema, it was shot simultaneously in Telugu and Tamil, the film revolves around a former district collector imprisoned in a haunted house. At the same time, she is interrogated by law enforcers investigating a politician they suspect of corruption.

Principal photography commenced in June 2016 in Hyderabad, and the film was released on 26 January 2018 in Telugu and Tamil along with a dubbed Malayalam version. The film became a hit, grossing around ₹67.20 crore. With Bhaagamathie, Anushka Shetty emerged as the second Indian actress after Sridevi and the first South Indian actress to have a $1 million grossed at the US box office. The film was remade in Hindi as Durgamati (2020).

== Plot ==
In Hyderabad, Home Minister Eshwar Prasad vows to resign from his post if the government fails to recover idols that were stolen over a period of six months. This troubles his party command, who forge a plan to destroy his credibility with the help of CBI Joint Director Vaishnavi Natarajan and ACP Sampath. The two plan to interrogate DC and Eshwar's close confidante Chanchala Reddy, who is in jail for murdering her fiance Shakthi, Sampath's brother. To avoid attention, they shift her to Bhaagamathie bungalow, a dilapidated, supposedly haunted house on the outskirts of a village which was ruled by a Queen named Bhaagamathie before independence, for the interrogation. Vaishnavi interrogates Chanchala to get some clues against Eshwar, but she repeats that they are doubting his integrity without any proof in a cryptic but leading manner.

Later that night, Bhaagamathie's spirit, takes control of Chanchala. The CBI team calls upon a psychiatrist to investigating the matter, and Chanchala is again possessed by Bhaagamathie's spirit when he provokes her, and she reveals her past: Bhaagamathie was the princess who fought the Nawab when the Dynasty of king Devraj had no sons and was invaded by the Nawabs. She came across Chandrasenudu, a man who pretended to be nice and was given the position of general by the people. He showed his true colours when he got the post. He looted money, land and even God. He then spread rumors that Bhaagamathie was mad and made her a prisoner in her own chamber. Unable to bear this, Bhaagamathie committed suicide and killed him as a ghost. The psychiatrist concludes that Chanchala must be schizophrenic as she seems to take on a different persona and narrate some story from a book as if it were her own and suggests that the CBI commit her to an asylum.

However, Sampath suspects that this might be a ploy by her to escape and arranges for a spiritual guru to find out if there is paranormal activity. The guru suggests a few indicators. After finding out that Chanchala will be vindicated from Shakti's murder case, Sampath goes to the bungalow to kill her and finds that the indicators marked the presence of paranormal activity. He also finds Chanchala hurting herself under the influence of the ghost. This leads to Sampath taking Chanchala to a mental asylum. Eshwar visits her at the mental asylum, where it is revealed that Chanchala had planned the entire thing to escape the CBI in return for ₹300 crore (US$32 million) kickback from Eshwar. It is also revealed that Eshwar had forced Chanchala to kill Shakthi, threatening to kill the villagers involved in a welfare project to hide his scam.

Meanwhile, Vaishnavi realizes that Chanchala was trying to convey the truth of Eshwar's crimes using the story of Queen Bhaagamathie, which she came across from the various writings and artifacts that she had discovered in the bungalow. She also finds evidence of Eshwar's misdeeds and the site where he hid the villagers after killing Shakthi. When Eshwar finds out that he is exposed, he is killed in an encounter by Sampath, who discovered the truth that Chanchala didn't murder Shakthi. Thus vindicated, Chanchala is seen running a charity organization in Shakthi's memory. Vaishnavi tells her that they thought they knew everything about her but never knew that she was a great magician in her childhood and that she knew Arabic. Chanchala replies by saying that she does not know Arabic, which shocks them, hinting that there was actual paranormal activity in the house.

== Cast ==
- Anushka Shetty as Bhaagamathie / Chanchala G. IAS (Sanchala G. IAS in Tamil)
- Unni Mukundan as Shakthi, Chanchala's love interest-turned-fiancé
- Jayaram as Home Minister Eshwar Prasad
- Asha Sarath as Vaishnavi Natarajan, Joint Director, CBI
- Murali Sharma as ACP Sampath IPS, Shakthi's elder brother
- Dhanraj as Constable Lingamurthy
- Prabhas Sreenu as Constable Subba Reddy
- Thalaivasal Vijay as Psychiatrist
- Vidyullekha Raman as Police SI Bhramara
- Nagineedu as CBI Special Director Dhanunjay
- Madhunandan as CBI Officer
- Devadarshini as Kanchana
- Surya as Registrar
- Ravi Raja Maguluri as Ajay, Prasad's enforcer
- Appaji Ambarisha Darbha as Corporate CEO
- Ajay Ghosh as Jose, Vaishnavi's assistant
- Kalpa Latha as villager

== Production ==
=== Development ===
G. Ashok, who had previously worked on Pilla Zamindar (2011) and Sukumarudu (2013), readied the Bhaagamathie script in 2012 and had written it keeping Anushka Shetty in mind. In late 2012, the team approached Anushka, and the actress liked the script but was not able to immediately commit to the film, as she had pending projects such as Baahubali: The Beginning (2015) and Rudhramadevi (2015), where she also played warrior princesses. The film was later delayed when Anushka chose to star in Lingaa (2014), attempt an ambitious size-shifting role in Size Zero (2015) and complete her portions for Baahubali: The Conclusion (2017). Ashok subsequently chose to wait for her, rather than cast a new actress and refined the script during the waiting period. Early media reports claimed that the film would be based on the queen Bhagmati, but the makers denied this and revealed that the film would be a "social drama".

=== Filming ===
Principal photography commenced in June 2016 in Hyderabad. The film's title is derived from the Bagmati river that flows through Nepal, while Ashok also stated that the titled was also inspired by the fact that Hyderabad was formed in the name of Bhagamathi or Bhagi Nagara. Once she began working on the film in 2016, she shed 20 kilograms through a rigorous diet plan to portray her character of an IAS Officer. Produced by UV Creations in Telugu and released by Studio Green in Tamil. A dubbed Malayalam version of the film was also prepared to have a simultaneous release with the other two versions.

== Soundtrack ==
Bhaagamathie

Soundtrack album by S. Thaman
- Released: 5 December 2016 (Jukebox)
- Studios: RFC (Hyderabad); YRF (Mumbai); Music lounge (Chennai); V studios (Chennai)
- Genres: Film soundtrack, Romantic
- Length: 9:56
- Languages: Telugu, Tamil
- Label: Mango Music
- Producer: S. Thaman

S. Thaman chronology
Achari America Yatra (2018)	Bhaagamathie (2016)	Tholi Prema (2018)
External audio
- Audio Jukebox on YouTube

The film's music was composed by S. Thaman.

The song "Mandaara" was released as single from the album of Bhaagamathie on 19 December 2016 on the YouTube page of Mango Music, UV Creations. The song was sung by Shreya Ghoshal. The music video of the track features Anushka Shetty and Unni Mukundan. On the same day of release, it was made available for online streaming at Saavn, Gaana and iTunes. The Tamil version of the song, lyrics by Vivek and sung by Jyotsna Radhakrishnan, was released at a function held by Studio Green in Chennai, which marked four significant events for the producers — the audio launch of Bhaagamathie, a single launch of Iruttu Araiyil Murattu Kuththu (2018), a single launch of Ghajinikanth (2018) and the success meet for Thaanaa Serndha Koottam (2018).

Telugu

Track listing
No.	Title	Lyrics	Singer(s)	Length
1.	"Mandaara Mandaara"	Sreejo	Shreya Ghoshal	4:52
2.	"Theme Song"	Suchitra	Suchitra	5:04
Total length:				9:56

Tamil

Track listing
No.	Title	Lyrics	Singer(s)	Length
1.	"Manthaara"	Vivek	Jyotsna Radhakrishnan	4:52
2.	"Theme Song"	Suchitra	Suchitra	5:04
Total length:				9:56

== Reception ==
=== Critical reception ===
On the review aggregator website Rotten Tomatoes, 83% of 6 critics' reviews are positive, with an average rating of 5.8/10.

Firstpost rated the film 3.5/5, stating "Bhaagamathie is an impressive outing for the whole cast and crew, and it's also a reminder for us that there are plenty of ways to narrate a story despite having a dilapidated house, a ghost, a hapless young woman, and a gut-wrenching backstory. A big thumbs up for the film."

Bollywood Life also rated it 3.5/5 and stated, "This is definitely worth a watch. For Anushka Shetty. For the story. and for the two combined."

123Telugu rated it 3.25/5, writing "On the whole, Bhaagamathie is an engaging thriller with good horror and interesting twists at regular intervals. Anushka leads from the front and will surely pull the crowds with her standout performance. The film is made on a lavish scale, and because of this, the thrills look quite good on screen. But the story is familiar, and the first half gets a bit slow. If you ignore these aspects, Bhaagamathie ends up a pretty decent watch this weekend. Go for it."

Idlebrain.com rated it 3/5, writing, "Bhaagamathie is a kind of film that’s difficult make and difficult to position in Telugu market. Director and production house have packaged the film in such a way that it partly satisfies the people who look for horror elements and the audiences who seek a thrill. Despite having a complicated screenplay, Bhaagamathie tries to give something for everybody. Plus points of the film are Anushka, screenplay and background music. On the flip side, the narration should have been true to its genre. On the whole, Bhaagamathie is a well-packaged thriller."

Hindustan Times also rated it 3/5 and wrote, "The film draws inspiration from history and adds a dash of supernatural to serve us a crime thriller. After the trailer, many believed that this could be a redux of Anushka’s claim to fame, Arundhati. Instead, G Ashok turns it into a riveting thriller that works wonders despite its flaws. You are on the edge of your seat through most of the film, trying to understand if Chanchala is possessed or not."

=== Box office ===
The film collected close to ₹50 crore (US$5.3 million) at the worldwide box office. It collected ₹36 crore (US$3.8 million) in the first weekend and ₹15.50 crore (US$1.7 million) on the weekdays at the worldwide box office. The film collected ₹51.50 crore (US$5.5 million) at first week.

== Awards and nominations ==
Date of ceremony	Award	Category	Recipient(s) and nominee(s)	Result	Ref.
6 January 2019	3rd Zee Cine Awards Telugu	Best Actress In A Leading Role	Anushka Shetty	Nominated	
6 January 2019	3rd Zee Cine Awards Telugu	Favorite Actress	Anushka Shetty	Nominated	
6 January 2019	3rd Zee Cine Awards Telugu	Best Supporting Actress	Asha Sharath	Nominated	
17 February 2019	TSR – TV9 National Film Awards	Best Actress – Telugu	Anushka Shetty	Nominated	
1 March 2019	Radio City Cine Awards Telugu	Best Heroine	Anushka Shetty	Nominated	
1 March 2019	Radio City Cine Awards Telugu	Best Actress in a Supporting Role	Asha Sharath	Nominated	
1 March 2019	Radio City Cine Awards Telugu	Best Female Playback Singer	Shreya Ghoshal	Nominated	
1 March 2019	Radio City Cine Awards Telugu	Best Actor in a Negative Role	Jayaram	Nominated	
1 March 2019	Radio City Cine Awards Telugu	Best Music Director	S. Thaman	Won	
1 March 2019	Radio City Cine Awards Telugu	Best Background Score	S. Thaman	Won	
15 August 2019	8th South Indian International Movie Awards	Best Actress – Telugu	Anushka Shetty	Nominated	
15 August 2019	8th South Indian International Movie Awards	Best Actress Critics – Telugu	Anushka Shetty	Nominated	
15 August 2019	8th South Indian International Movie Awards	Best Supporting Actress (Telugu)	Asha Sharath	Nominated	
15 August 2019	8th South Indian International Movie Awards	Best Actor in a Negative Role – Telugu	Jayaram	Nominated	
21 December 2019	66th Filmfare Awards South	Best Actress – Telugu	Anushka Shetty	Nominated	
21 December 2019	66th Filmfare Awards South	Best Supporting Actress – Telugu	Asha Sharath	Nominated	
21 December 2019	66th Filmfare Awards South	Best Female Playback Singer – Telugu	Shreya Ghoshal	Won	
29 September 2019	17th Santosham Film Awards	Best Actress	Anushka Shetty	Nominated	
