= Deiva Thirumagal =

2011 Indian film by A. L. Vijay

- Theatrical release poster
- Directed by: Vijay
- Written by: Vijay
- Produced by: M. Chinthamani; Ronnie Screwvala
- Starring: Vikram; Sara Arjun; Anushka Shetty; Amala Paul; Nassar; Santhanam; Sachin Khedekar
- Cinematography: Nirav Shah
- Edited by: Anthony
- Music by: G. V. Prakash Kumar
- Production companies: UTV Motion Pictures; Sree Rajakaliamman Medias
- Distributed by: UTV Motion Pictures
- Release date: 15 July 2011 (India)
- Running time: 166 minutes
- Country: India
- Language: Tamil

Deiva Thirumagal (transl. God's Daughter) is a 2011 Indian Tamil-language legal drama film written and directed by A. L. Vijay and produced by M. Chinthamani and Ronnie Screwvala. The film features Vikram in lead role as an intellectually-disabled man, with an ensemble cast including Sara Arjun (in her Tamil debut), Anushka Shetty, Amala Paul, Nassar, Krishna Kumar, Santhanam, M. S. Bhaskar and Sachin Khedekar.

The film comprises director Vijay's regular technical crew with G. V. Prakash Kumar as music composer, Nirav Shah as cinematographer and Anthony as editor. Audiography was done by M. R. Rajakrishnan. Inspired by the 2001 American film I Am Sam, the film released on 15 July 2011, and was later released in Japan as Kamisama ga Kureta Musume.

== Plot ==
Krishna is an intellectually disabled man. He lives a peaceful life in the village of Avilanji, working at a chocolate factory owned by his caretaker Victor. One day, he excitedly announces to the village that he is going to be a father. That same night, his daughter is born, but his wife Banumathy, dies during childbirth. Unable to grasp the concept of death, Krishna believes she has simply "gone to God" and takes on the role of a single father. He names the girl Nila and raises her with immense love and care.

Years later, Nila grows into a happy young girl. With the help of Victor and Krishna's other disabled friends, she is enrolled into a school where she adjusts quickly. She develops a close, maternal bond with the school's vice-principal, Shwetha. Upon seeing Nila with Krishna, Shwetha recognizes him as her estranged sister Banumathy's husband, making Nila her niece. Fearing that Krishna's condition might cause him to unintentionally harm the child, Shwetha refuses to let Nila stay with him, resulting in a scuffle between Krishna and Shwetha's fiancé, Karthik.

The altercation is diffused by Rajendran, the father of Shwetha and Banumathy. Rajendran reveals that Banumathy cut ties with him to marry Krishna. He offers to take both Krishna and Nila into his home, claiming they are part of the family. Victor agrees and sends them along, but during the journey to Chennai, Rajendran tricks Krishna into exiting the car and abandons him on the road.

Distraught, Krishna wanders the unfamiliar city searching for Nila. He eventually ends up at a courthouse, where a junior lawyer named Vinod assumes Krishna is a wealthy client and promises that his boss will defend him. Vinod introduces him to Anuradha Ragunathan, a sharp attorney who initially hesitates to take the case, believing Krishna is mentally unstable. However, Victor arrives in the city looking for Krishna; he explains the entire predicament to Anuradha, which convinces the lawyer to take the case.

Anuradha files a habeas corpus petition against Rajendran. Her confidence is shaken upon learning that Rajendran has hired Bhashyam, a formidable senior advocate who has never lost a case. The custody battle escalates to the High Court, where both sides fiercely argue over who is best suited to raise the child. During the cross-examination, Bhashyam directly questions Krishna on how an intellectually disabled, low-income man can properly raise a daughter and support her financially.

Following a tearful emotional breakdown that demonstrates the unbreakable bond and affection between the father and daughter, a moved Bhashyam voluntarily withdraws the case, conceding custody of Nila to Krishna before exiting the courtroom. After winning the legal battle and spending some quality time with his daughter, Krishna makes a selfless choice. Realizing her need for financial stability and a comfortable upbringing, he returns Nila to Shwetha so she can grow up to achieve her dream of becoming a doctor. Krishna then returns to resume his old job at Victor's chocolate factory.

== Cast ==
- Vikram as Krishna
- Sara Arjun as Nila Krishna, Krishna's daughter
- Anushka Shetty as Anuradha Ragunathan (Voiced by Deepa Venkat)
- Amala Paul as Shwetha Rajendran (Voiced by Savitha Reddy), Krishna's sister-in-law
- Nassar as Bashyam, a lawyer
- Santhanam as Vinod,
- Sachin Khedekar as Rajendran, Krishna's father-in-law
- Krishna Kumar as Victor
- M. S. Bhaskar as Murthy
- Y. Gee. Mahendra as Ragunathan
- Pandi as Muruga
- T. M. Karthik as Krishna's friend
- George Maryan as Krishna's friend
- M. R. Kishore Kumar as Krishna's friend
- Surekha Vani as Murthy's wife
- Rethika Srinivas as Bashyam's wife
- Gadam Kishan as Muttakannan
- Ravi Venkatraman as Dr. Basheer
- Tulasi as Priya
- Karthik Kumar as Karthik (Guest appearance)

== Production ==
=== Development ===
The production of the film took five months from start to finish, however, Vijay claimed that the film had been in his plans for four years, but he waited for Vikram to give him dates. While Anushka Shetty was cast as the lead actress, Amala Paul, who appeared in the lead role in Mynaa, was signed for another role, replacing Meera Jasmine, who opted out of the film before production began. Despite reports that Divya Spandana joined the cast in early 2011, Vijay refuted the claim as a rumour. Sara Arjun had appeared in a commercial for Vijay when she was two years old but he then lost touch with Arjun's family, before he met them and cast Arjun in this film following a visit to Mumbai. It is Arjun's Tamil debut.

=== Filming ===
The film was predominantly across the hill country settings in Ooty throughout late 2010, with a chocolate factory being constructed as a set by art director Santhanam. Court-related scenes were later shot in Chennai. The team returned to Ooty in February 2011 to complete the final schedule, after which the film was completed. In order to perfect his portrayal of a mentally disabled adult with the maturity of a five-year-old boy, Vikram visited Vidya Sagar, a school for children with special needs, to learn and study the behavior of such children.

=== Title disputes ===
The film initially proceeded without an official title but the makers struggled to finalise one. The film was tentatively titled Deiva Magan (Son of God), a title from a 1969 film featuring Sivaji Ganesan. However, problems arose after Sivaji Productions claimed that they owned the rights of the title and expressed their interest on using the name for a future production featuring Sivaji's grandson, Vikram Prabhu. The title Pitha (Father) ran into trouble after a debutant team announced that they had registered the title. Another title Deiva Thirumagan was finalised, but attracted controversies with the Thevar community due to it being a nickname of Pasumpon Muthuramalinga Thevar. Eventually the film was retitled Deiva Thirumagal.

== Themes and influences ==
Despite Vijay denying it, many critics believed the film was heavily inspired from Jessie Nelson's 2001 drama film I Am Sam. Malathi Rangarajan of The Hindu stated that "Those who have watched the Sean Penn stunner, I am Sam, and Dustin Hoffman's autistic travel in Rain Man can easily spot the similarities between them and DT", adding that it "reminds you of Balu Mahendra's inimitable Moondraam Pirai. And at times Kamal's Guna". Vijay has said that the film is about his cousin's real-life story and this is not a remake.

== Soundtrack ==
The film score and soundtrack for Deiva Thirumagan is composed by G. V. Prakash Kumar, collaborating with director Vijay for the third time after the success of Kireedam and Madrasapattinam. The soundtrack album released on 14 April 2011, at the Chennai Trade Centre.

There are allegations that the song "Jagada Thom" has been taken from Amaan Ali Khan and Ayaan Ali Khan's 2007 song "Truth" from the album of the same name. The song "Pa Pa Pappa" is partially based on "Whistle-Stop" from Robin Hood (1973).

== Release ==
Though initially planned to be released in 400-500 screens in India alone, the film was released by UTV only across 250 screens in Tamil Nadu and another 50 in North India. The film premiered in Dubai on 14 July 2011 and had its theatrical worldwide release the next day, 15 July.

== Reception ==
=== Critical response ===
The film received positive reviews. CNN-IBN gave three and a half out of five stars, lauding Vijay for "having handled the emotional sequences with maturity", further adding that "his creative grip over the medium and the subject lifts the movie to higher levels despite some flaws and slow narrative." Sify noted that it was Vikram's "best work in years", further writing: "You can feel the earnestness of his intentions and the wetness of his tears. He is able to nail the character's boyish charm and innocence like sunshine and his restraint in the courtroom scene and his poignant dialogues in the climax, is heart breaking". S. Viswanath from the Deccan Herald stated that "Deiva Thirumagan, with A L Vijay [...] proving his mettle and supported by his glorious team, ensures it's worth the ticket money", labelling it as a "not-to-be missed, must-see movie."

Chennai Online cited it was a "stand-out film" that "works a big way with its sensitive approach, good music, spectacular cinematography, and excellent performances". Malathi Rangarajan from The Hindu called it "a sensitive poem on celluloid" that "showcases paternal instinct in all its poignancy" further citing that "Vijay provides enough fodder for this veritable storehouse of talent, and the actor gobbles it up with glee". She heaped praise on Vikram stating "an antithesis almost, but temerity or timidity, the actor accomplishes the task assigned, with élan." Pavithra Srinivasan from Rediff rated it two and a half, praising Vikram's performance, while citing that "if you're a fan of sentimental tear-jerkers, and have not seen I am Sam, Deiva Thirumagal might impress. For the rest, it might provide a sense of déjà vu, and towards the end, the meandering, weak screenplay is largely dissatisfying."

=== Box office ===
In Chennai, the film collected ₹80 lakh in the first three days with 100% occupancy in theaters.

=== Accolades ===
Award (Note: Awards, festivals and organizations are in alphabetical order.)	Date of ceremony (Note: Date is linked to the article about the awards held that year, wherever possible.)	Category	Recipient(s)	Result	Ref.
Ananda Vikatan Cinema Awards	5 January 2012	Best Actor – Male	Vikram	Won	
Ananda Vikatan Cinema Awards	5 January 2012	Best Comedian – Male	Santhanam	Won	
Ananda Vikatan Cinema Awards	5 January 2012	Best Child Artist	Sara Arjun	Won	
Ananda Vikatan Cinema Awards	5 January 2012	Best Playback Singer – Female	Saindhavi – for ("Vizhigalil Oru")	Won	
Filmfare Awards South	7 July 2012	Best Film – Tamil	M. Chinthamani, Ronnie Screwvala	Nominated	
Filmfare Awards South	7 July 2012	Best Director – Tamil	A. L. Vijay	Nominated	
Filmfare Awards South	7 July 2012	Best Actor – Tamil	Vikram	Nominated	
Filmfare Awards South	7 July 2012	Critics Best Actor – Tamil	Vikram	Won	
Filmfare Awards South	7 July 2012	Best Actress – Tamil	Anushka Shetty	Nominated	
Filmfare Awards South	7 July 2012	Best Supporting Actor – Tamil	Santhanam	Nominated	
Filmfare Awards South	7 July 2012	Best Supporting Actress – Tamil	Amala Paul	Nominated	
Filmfare Awards South	7 July 2012	Best Music Director – Tamil	G. V. Prakash Kumar	Nominated	
Filmfare Awards South	7 July 2012	Best Lyricist – Tamil	Na. Muthukumar – for ("Vizhigalil Oru")	Nominated	
Filmfare Awards South	7 July 2012	Best Female Playback Singer – Tamil	Saindhavi – for ("Vizhigalil Oru")	Nominated	
Mirchi Music Awards South	4 August 2012	Listener's Choice Award − Song	G. V. Prakash Kumar for ("Arariro")	Won (1st place)	
Mirchi Music Awards South	4 August 2012	Listener's Choice Award − Album	G. V. Prakash Kumar	Won (3rd place)	
Osaka Asian Film Festival	9–18 March 2012	Grand Prix Award for Best Film	Deiva Thirumagal	Won	
Osaka Asian Film Festival	9–18 March 2012	ABC Award for Best Entertainer	Deiva Thirumagal	Won	
South Indian International Movie Awards	21–22 June 2012	Best Actor – Tamil	Vikram	Nominated	
South Indian International Movie Awards	21–22 June 2012	Best Actor – Special Appreciation	Vikram	Won	
South Indian International Movie Awards	21–22 June 2012	Best Actress – Tamil	Anushka Shetty	Nominated	
Vijay Awards	16 June 2012	Best Actor	Vikram	Won	
Vijay Awards	16 June 2012	Favourite Hero	Vikram	Nominated	
Vijay Awards	16 June 2012	Best Actress	Anushka Shetty	Nominated	
Vijay Awards	16 June 2012	Favourite Heroine	Anushka Shetty	Won	
Vijay Awards	16 June 2012	Special Jury Award – Best Child Artist	Sara Arjun	Won	
Vijay Awards	16 June 2012	Best Comedian	Santhanam	Won	
Vijay Awards	16 June 2012	Best Cinematographer	Nirav Shah	Nominated	
Vijay Awards	16 June 2012	Best Background Score	G. V. Prakash Kumar	Nominated	
Vijay Awards	16 June 2012	Best Lyricist	Na. Muthukumar – for ("Vizhigalil Oru")	Nominated	
Vijay Awards	16 June 2012	Best Male Playback Singer	Haricharan – for ("Aariraro")	Nominated	
