= Super (2005 film) =

- Poster
- Directed by: Puri Jagannadh
- Written by: Puri Jagannadh
- Produced by: Nagarjuna
- Starring: Nagarjuna; Sonu Sood; Anushka Shetty; Ayesha Takia
- Cinematography: Shyam K. Naidu
- Edited by: Marthand K. Venkatesh
- Music by: Sandeep Chowta
- Production company: Annapurna Studios
- Distributed by: Metro-Goldwyn-Mayer
- Release date: 21 July 2005
- Running time: 151 minutes
- Country: India
- Language: Telugu

Super is a 2005 Indian Telugu-language heist action thriller film written and directed by Puri Jagannadh. It was produced by Nagarjuna on Annapurna Studios banner. The film stars Nagarjuna, Sonu Sood, Anushka Shetty and Ayesha Takia. The music was composed by Sandeep Chowta, while the cinematography and editing were handled by Shyam K. Naidu and Marthand K. Venkatesh. The film also marks Ayesha's Telugu debut and Anushka's acting debut.

Super was released on 21 July 2005 while the Hindi version was released in 2007 as "Robbery" and received mixed reviews from critics, where it became an average grosser at the box office.

== Plot ==
Akhil, a call cab service owner, falls in love with Dr. Srivalli alias Sri, who soon falls in love with him as well. Sonu is a big-time hi-tech robber. who used to work for Siri's father as a car mechanic. He adopts Siri as his sister and brings her into his home after his father dies from car crash. Incidentally, Akhil and Sonu are enemies. Realizing that Siri is deeply in love with Akhil, Sonu asks her to put an end to their relationship and never see him again. Siri goes to Akhil's house to learn about Sonu's enmity with Akhil. Akhil reveals that he and Sonu were former best friends who met as recent graduates. They struggled to get jobs along with Sonu's real sister Sasha, who was also a graduate.

When Sasha suffered from appendicitis, Akhil and Sonu started robbing banks and managed to pay for her surgery. After that, they decided to continue robbing banks and stealing lots of money. Sasha fell in love with Akhil and proposed to him, but Akhil refused as he liked Sasha as her best friend. One day, Sasha was found dead on the road by Sonu and Akhil with her arm slightly cut and died from blood loss, where they assumed she committed suicide. Because of this, Sonu blames Akhil for her death and starts hating him, which causes their friendship to end. Due to this, Akhil decided to live a normal life. John Abraham, the artist who was trying to draw a picture of Sonu ended up drawing Akhil's picture. The police arrests Akhil, who also looks like one of the mysterious guys from the police surveillance video.

According to the video, it is revealed that Sasha was murdered. Akhil lies to the cops that he is not in the video, and Abraham says that Akhil is not a thief. Sonu follows Akhil to the Biker's Club. Akhil and Sonu realize that the Biker's Club owner Mama was responsible for their robberies and Sasha's death. Sasha was at the club late, where she found out that Mama's men were the ones who told them to rob the diamonds. The goons planned to kill the trio (Akhil, Sonu, and Sasha) right after they succeed in the robbery. Sasha tried to escape, but the goons killed her and make Akhil and Sonu believe that she committed suicide. After learning the truth, Sonu apologizes and reconciles with Akhil, but Mama reveals he kidnapped Siri and tells Akhil and Sonu to rob the same diamonds which they were supposed to rob in Goa.

Akhil and Sonu successfully rob the diamonds by blowing up underneath the truck carrying the diamonds (inspired by The Italian Job) and falling into the sea. Akhil dives into the ocean and retrieves the diamonds. The cops chase Sonu and Akhil on motorboats. One of the cops shoots Sonu, who falls into the ocean. Akhil does not stop and heads over to Mama's place. Akhil gets hold of Sonu, who is actually alive and was wearing a bulletproof vest. Sonu saves Siri from Mama's clutches. Akhil and Sonu manage to kill everyone and keep the diamonds. Abraham finally draws Sonu's picture, but the police do not believe Abraham and that the police captain already got transferred to another town. Akhil and Sonu give a diamond to Abraham and tell him to draw a picture of Akhil and Siri.

== Cast ==
- Nagarjuna Akkineni as Akhil
- Anushka Shetty as Sasha
- Sonu Sood as Sonu
- Ayesha Takia as Srivalli
- Piyush Mishra as Mama
- Brahmanandam as Lie Detector Expert
- Ali as John Abraham, an artist
- Sunil as News Reporter
- Sayaji Shinde as Inspector
- Pragathi as Lalita, Siri's mother
- Sudha as Rajyalakshmi, Sasha's mother
- Kota Srinivasa Rao as Lakshmi Narayana, Sasha's father
- Paruchuri Venkateswara Rao as Venkatachalam, Siri's father
- Giri Babu as Rama Chandra Murthy, Akhil's father
- Sumitra as Lakshmi, Akhil's mother
- Venu Madhav as Tattoo Designer
- Khayyum as Akhil's friend
- Amit Tiwari as Eve teaser

== Soundtrack ==
The music was composed by Sandeep Chowta and was released by MARUTHI Music Company.

Super

Film score by Sandeep Chowta
- Released: 2005
- Genre: Soundtrack
- Length: 30:08
- Label: Maruthi Music
- Producer: Sandeep Chowta

Sandeep Chowta chronology
Rakht (2004)	Super (2005)	Political Rowdy (2005)

No.	Title	Lyrics	Singer(s)	Length
1.	"Akkad Bakkad"	Kandikonda	Sonu Kakkar	4:57
2.	"Chandramukhi"	Vishwa	Sandeep Chowta	5:20
3.	"Gichhi Gichhi"	Vishwa	Udit Narayan, Sowmya	4:50
4.	"Mastana"	Kandikonda	Sandeep Chowta, Nikita	5:09
5.	"Mila Mila"	Bhaskarabhatla Ravikumar	Anushka Manchanda	5:35
6.	"Mudduletti"	Bhaskarabhatla Ravikumar	Sonu Nigam, Sonu Kakkar	4:20
Total length:				30:08

== Accolades ==
The film was nominated for seven categories at the South Filmfare Awards in 2006.

Award (Note: Awards, festivals and organizations are in alphabetical order.)	Date of ceremony (Note: Date is linked to the article about the awards held that year, wherever possible.)	Category	Recipient(s)	Result	Ref.
Filmfare Awards South	9 September 2006	Best Film – Telugu	Super	Nominated	
Filmfare Awards South	9 September 2006	Best Director – Telugu	Puri Jagannadh	Nominated	
Filmfare Awards South	9 September 2006	Best Actor – Telugu	Nagarjuna	Nominated	
Filmfare Awards South	9 September 2006	Best Actress – Telugu	Ayesha Takia	Nominated	
Filmfare Awards South	9 September 2006	Best Supporting Actress – Telugu	Anushka Shetty	Nominated	
Filmfare Awards South	9 September 2006	Best Comedian – Telugu	Ali	Won	
Filmfare Awards South	9 September 2006	Best Music Director – Telugu	Sandeep Chowta	Nominated	
