= Nishabdham =

2020 film directed by Hemant Madhukar

- Official release poster
- Directed by: Hemant Madhukar
- Screenplay by: Kona Venkat
- Story by: Hemant Madhukar
- Produced by: Kona Venkat; T. G. Vishwa Prasad
- Starring: Anushka Shetty; R. Madhavan; Michael Madsen; Anjali; Shalini Pandey; Subbaraju
- Cinematography: Shaneil Deo
- Edited by: Prawin Pudi
- Music by: Girishh G.
- Production companies: Kona Film Corporation; People Media Factory
- Distributed by: Amazon Prime Video
- Release date: 2 October 2020
- Running time: 130 minutes
- Country: India
- Language: Telugu
- Budget: ₹30 crore

Nishabdham (transl. Silence) is a 2020 Indian Telugu-language mystery film directed by Hemant Madhukar and co-produced by Kona Venkat and T. G. Vishwa Prasad. The film stars Anushka Shetty, R. Madhavan, Michael Madsen, Anjali, Shalini Pandey and Subbaraju. The film was intended to have no dialogues. It was partly reshot and partly dubbed in Tamil as Silence. The film is released along with the dubbed versions in Malayalam and Kannada languages, through Amazon Prime Video on 2 October 2020.

== Plot ==
In 1972, a couple spending Christmas night at a villa near Seattle is mysteriously murdered, with the male victim being crucified. The King County takes possession of the villa, which remains unsold until 2019 due to its reputation as a haunted house.

Sakshi, a deaf-mute artist, travels with her fiancé to the villa to find a painting of a previous owner whose ghost is believed to have killed the couple. However, she runs away, bloodstained, after a while and gets hit by a car. Detective Mahalakshmi and Captain Richard Dawkins are assigned to investigate. It is revealed that Sakshi's fiancé has died in the basement, and as his corpse is taken out, a key falls from his hand. Maha interrogates Sakshi in the hospital, learning that she found his body crucified and could not see the attacker. Maha then researches the victim, Anthony Gonsalves, a famous cellist whose previous wife committed suicide.

As many girls have already gone missing in Seattle, the police is under heavy scrutiny. The initial investigation is inconclusive, so Sakshi is interviewed again. It is revealed that soon after her engagement with Anthony, Sakshi's best friend Sonali went missing. Sakshi recounts her past. She grew up in an orphanage in Sequim where she met Sonali. One day, she received an invitation to show her art in a Seattle gallery. Sonali, who is very possessive, disagrees but changes her mind after deciding to live with Sakshi. At the gallery, Sakshi meets Vivek, a photographer. Anthony, a new exhibition's guest of honor, meets Sakshi and is impressed by her work. He donates a million dollars to her orphanage and invites her to his concert. Sakshi attends and is mesmerized by his music. They grow closer and eventually fall in love and get engaged. After Sonali went missing, she decided to go to the villa for a week to relax and find the painting.

Maha realizes that Sonali wants all of Sakshi's attention after seeing similar behavior in a child. She goes to the orphanage to investigate Sonali's disappearance, suspecting a connection to Anthony's death. She learns that Sonali's only friend was Sakshi and that Sonali was even arrested for stabbing someone who went out with her. Maha also finds a drawing of a crucifixion in Sonali's room. Concerned, Maha goes to Sakshi's house and encounters a hooded man who escapes after she shoots at him. The police searches the villa again, hoping to discover evidence against Sonali. Tom finds the key in the basement and brings it to Richard, who kills Tom and pockets it. Maha notices Richard's coat button next to Tom's corpse and suspects his involvement, so she breaks into his office and gets the key. She then trails Richard and follows him to a farmhouse, which she discovers secretly belongs to Anthony. Richard searches for the house's CCTV footage to no avail and leaves. Soon afterwards, the hooded man, revealed to be Vivek, who took the footage earlier, meets with Sakshi at the Space Needle, where a flashback occurs.

Vivek and Sakshi became good friends and started living together with Sonali, who becomes jealous. Vivek is hurt, but Sakshi explains Sonali's nature. When Sonali and Sakshi were baristas, a customer asked Sakshi out. Sonali insists that he is a flirt and tries to prove it. Sonali and Sakshi go out with him for coffee, and Sonali rubbed his leg. The customer put his hand up Sonali's skirt under the table, so she brought her hand up and stabbed it with a fork, leading to her arrest. Vivek decides to give Sonali a chance, and they begin to get along. With Sakshi's encouragement, Vivek and Sonali fall in love. Later on, when Anthony proposes to Sakshi, Sonali is displeased. One day after Anthony's concert, his fans greet him. Some kiss him and even give him their phone number. Sonali tries to convince Sakshi that Anthony is also a flirt, but Sakshi dismisses her. Sonali texts him flirtatiously to prove it. He refuses at first but eventually agrees to meet her. Sakshi reassures Sonali that he does not have bad intentions, but Sonali goes to meet him anyway, with Sakshi secretly observing them. She sees them drink and get intimate in the farmhouse. However, Anthony suddenly kills Sonali. Richard arrives and helps Anthony clean up the scene. Sakshi left unnoticed and told Vivek what happened. They went to the police station, where she recognized Richard. Anthony brought Sakshi to Richard again to report Sonali's disappearance, where she saw a poster for a girl who gave Anthony her number. Sakshi discovered that the dates of the disappearances coincide with Anthony's concerts. She, with Vivek, planned to take revenge by deceiving Anthony into going to the villa so Vivek could kill him. After Anthony is knocked out and restrained, they interrogate him after he wakes up.

Anthony reveals that he killed his wife and her lover at a motel for their unfaithfulness. Richard entered the room and decided to let him continue. When he went to meet Richard outside, Richard reveals he came to the same motel to investigate his wife, who was also cheating on him in another room. Anthony then proceeded to kill Richard's wife, and Richard helped cover up the murders. Subsequently, Anthony begins killing all unfaithful women who hit on him, and Richard hides all the bodies and evidence. Upon hearing this, Sakshi kills Anthony in rage.

In the present, Sakshi and Vivek decide to expose Richard to the FBI using the footage. However, Richard kidnaps Vivek and holds him hostage. Maha, who put a tracker on Richard's car earlier, kills Richard and saves them. Afterwards, Richard and Anthony's crimes are finally proven, and Anthony's murder officially remains unsolved. The film ends with Sakshi and Vivek paying respects to Sonali at her grave.

== Cast ==
- Anushka Shetty as Sakshi
- R. Madhavan as Anthony Gonsalves
- Michael Madsen as Richard Dawkins
- Anjali as Mahalakshmi "Maha"
- Shalini Pandey as Sonali
- Subbaraju as Vivek
- Srinivas Avasarala as Purna Chandra Rao / Surya Kandasamy
- Ravi Dasika as Kalyan Varma
- Hunter O'Harrow as Tom Orbach
- Olivia Dunkley as Iris
- Emily Aron as Margaret
- Rene Hamlet as Nancy
- Reza Leal-Smartt as Clara
- Will Ammann as Sam
- Jon Palms as David
- Ravyn Celestino as Peter
- Dean Hargrave as Jackson
- Timothy Krabill as Martin Escavado

== Production ==
In 2013, director Hemant Madhukar re-watched Singeetam Srinivasa Rao's dialogue-less film Pushpaka Vimana (1987) and developed a desire to make a similar dialogue-less film. He was keen to explore the idea with a hearing and speech impaired protagonist. Once he wrote the story that would become Nishabdham, he pitched it to the PVP Group for production, but there was no progress for months despite PVP liking the idea. Madhukar then discussed the project with screenwriter Kona Venkat, who helped improvise the script and develop the screenplay. Venkat felt it had potential to be an "international project", and included dialogues.

R. Madhavan and Taapsee Pannu were signed on to play the lead roles, though the actress later opted out citing a scheduling conflict. While on a flight, Venkat had a chance meeting with Anushka Shetty, narrated the script to her, and she joined the project, marking her second collaboration with Madhavan after Rendu (2006). Anjali was cast as an American police officer, while American actor Michael Madsen was cast in an important role. Shalini Pandey, Subbaraju, and Srinivas Avasarala were cast in supporting roles.

Principal photography began in May 2019. The filming took place predominantly in the United States, with a 60-day long schedule. The film was mostly shot in Telugu except for R. Madhavan's portions, which were shot in Tamil, and Anjali's portions, which were shot in both languages. The majority of the Tamil version was dubbed from the Telugu version. The international actors spoke their lines in English.

== Soundtrack ==
The soundtrack was composed by Gopi Sundar, whereas the lyrics for the Telugu version are written by Bhaskarabhatla, Sreejo, Krishna Kanth, and Ramajogayya Sastry. The song "Ninne Ninne" in Telugu and "Neeye Neeye" in Tamil was released as single from the album on 17 December 2019. "Madhuramithe" in Telugu and "Pudhu Unarvae" in Tamil were released on 29 September 2020.

Telugu
No.	Title	Lyrics	Singer(s)	Length
1.	"Ninne Ninne"	Bhaskarabhatla	Sid Sriram	5:31
2.	"Madhuramithe"	Sreejo	Najim Arshad, Harini	4:27
3.	"Nee Kanupaapa"	Ramajogayya Sastry	Chinmayi (Soundtrack Version), Bhadra Rajin (Film Version)	5:35
4.	"Cello Song - Ee Premante Inthe"	Krishna Kanth	Vijay Yesudas	3:25

Tamil
No.	Title	Lyrics	Singer(s)	Length
1.	"Neeye Neeye"	Karunakaran	Aalap Raju	5:35
2.	"Pudhu Unarvae"	Karunakaran	Karthik, Harini	4:24
3.	"Naan Unarvodu"	Karunakaran	Chinmayi	5:37
4.	"Cello Song - Yen Pennellam Inke"	Karunakaran	Vijay Yesudas	3:26

Malayalam
No.	Title	Lyrics	Singer(s)	Length
1.	"Neeye Neeye"	B. K. Harinarayanan	Madhu Balakrishnan	5:35
2.	"Pudhu Ninavae"	B. K. Harinarayanan	Najim Arshad, Bhadra Rajin	4:29
3.	"Thee Vitharunna"	B. K. Harinarayanam	Divya S. Menon	5:37
4.	"Cello Song - Nee Thullunnathenthe"	B. K. Harinarayanan	Vijay Yesudas	3:26

== Release ==
The film was scheduled to be released on 21 February 2020 but was postponed to 2 April 2020. Due to the COVID-19 pandemic the film's release was postponed indefinitely. The official trailer was launched by Amazon Prime Video on 21 September 2020.

The film was released through Prime Video on 2 October 2020 in Telugu and Tamil languages, along with dubbed versions in Malayalam and Kannada.

== Reception ==
Regarding the Telugu version, The Times of India gave the film three out of five stars and stated, "Nishabdham on the whole promises to be a treat, not just to Anushka’s fans but to movie buffs who love thrillers too. Sadly, it doesn’t always live up to that promise because all it ends up being is a stylish film with no depth". Regarding the Tamil version, The Times of India gave the film a rating of two out of five stars and noted that "Silence is meant to be a whodunit, but the moment you get the plot points, the film stops being one" and additionally stated that "the Tamil version resembles a dubbed film".

Karthik Kumar of Hindustan Times called Nishabdham "a colossal mess", and added, "Despite the presence of some talented stars like Anushka and Madhavan, the film is excruciatingly boring and lacks the thrills to keep one invested throughout." Sowmya Rajendran writing for The News Minute, opined that "The ideas must have sounded good on paper but the writing and execution, unfortunately, don't hold up." While appreciating the performances of Shetty and Pandey, Sowmya wrote "Michael Madsen as police chief Richard Dickens deserved more to his character. With a limp and a swagger, he does his best with what he's given."
