= Vaanam =

2011 film by Krish

- Theatrical release poster
- Directed by: Krish
- Screenplay by: Krish
- Dialogues by: S. Gnanagiri
- Based on: Vedam by Krish
- Produced by: VTV Ganesh; R. Ganesh
- Starring: Silambarasan; Bharath; Prakash Raj; Anushka Shetty; Santhanam; Sonia Agarwal; Saranya Ponvannan
- Cinematography: Nirav Shah; Gnana Shekar V. S.
- Edited by: Anthony
- Music by: Yuvan Shankar Raja
- Production companies: VTV Productions; Magic Box Pictures
- Distributed by: Cloud Nine Movies
- Release date: 29 April 2011
- Running time: 161 minutes
- Country: India
- Language: Tamil

Vaanam (transl. Sky) is a 2011 Indian Tamil-language hyperlink action drama film written and directed by Krish. A remake of the director's own Telugu film Vedam (2010), it has an ensemble cast of Silambarasan, Bharath, Prakash Raj, Anushka Shetty, Santhanam, Sonia Agarwal and Saranya Ponvannan. Anushka and Saranya reprise their roles from the original. The score and soundtrack were composed by Yuvan Shankar Raja; cinematography and editing were by Nirav Shah and Anthony, respectively. The film, produced by VTV Ganesh and R. Ganesh, was distributed by Dayanidhi Azhagiri's Cloud Nine Movies.

Vaanam revolves around the lives of five people from different walks of life, illustrating how their fates intertwine on New Year's Eve at a Chennai hospital. Released on 29 April 2011, it received mostly positive reviews and was a box-office success.

== Plot ==
Thillai "Cable" Raja is a cable operator born and raised in a Chennai slum. He bemoans his poverty and wants to become rich by marrying his girlfriend Priya. Raja cons her into believing he is well-off and adopts a refined persona for her. He is accompanied by his best friend Seenu and guided by bhajan singer Ganesh. When Priya asks him to buy expensive tickets to a New Year's Eve gala, Raja is very short of money. After a failed attempt at chain snatching in which he crosses paths with the police, he heads to a hospital with theft on his mind.

Bharath Chakravarthy, an aspiring rockstar from Bangalore, is irresponsible but well-meaning. His mother disapproves of his dream and wants him to become an army officer. When Bharath's band misses their flight to a concert because of him, he drives them to Chennai via road. He and his girlfriend Laasya are attacked by religious fanatics and are aided by strangers; this makes him reflect on life. When they arrive in Chennai, their vehicle collides with an auto rickshaw carrying a pregnant woman. Forgoing the concert, Bharath and Laasya rush her to the hospital.

Saroja is a sex worker at Rani Amma's brothel on the Tamil Nadu-Andhra border. When she discovers that her life is in danger while working there, she escapes to Chennai with her sister Karpooram in the hope of starting a business venture. Hounded by thugs and the police, they are led into a trap. In a fight, Karpooram is mortally wounded in a fight, and Saroja carries her to the hospital.

Rahimuddin Qureshi and his wife Zara lost their unborn twins in a Coimbatore riot. Zara becomes pregnant again a few months later, and Rahim goes to Chennai to find his younger brother, who had run away after the riot. Rahim is in repeated conflict with Shivaram, an anti-Muslim police officer who suspects him of terrorism. He is brutally assaulted by Shivaram and admitted to the hospital under close supervision.

Lakshmi is the daughter-in-law of a poor weaver in Thoothukudi. When the weaver cannot repay a loan from cruel moneylender Narasimman, Narasimman kidnaps Lakshmi's bright young son and refuses to release him until the debt is paid. Lakshmi arrives in Chennai with her father-in-law, hoping to sell one of her kidneys to obtain money. She undergoes the surgery and receives money, which is insufficient. Raja steals Lakshmi's money, and she and her father-in-law contemplate suicide.

Conscience-stricken, Raja confesses to Priya and returns the money with some of his own; Lakshmi forgives him. Rahim learns that terrorist leader Mansoor Khan and his gang are planning to kill the people in the hospital. He tries to escape, but when he sees Bharath wheeling in a pregnant woman, he is reminded of his wife and offers to help them. The terrorist strike begins, and several people are shot to death. Raja, Bharath, Rahim, and Saroja lead a small group of survivors to an empty room.

Raja and Bharath kill two terrorists, and Bharath takes several bullets in his shoulder to save Saroja. Rahim saves Shivaram from a shooter and encounters his brother, who is part of the terrorist gang. Rahim's brother shoots himself, and Khan reveals himself as a suicide bomber ready to explode. Raja sacrifices himself by pulling Khan and falling out a window; an explosion follows.

In the aftermath, Bharath, who lost one of his hands, is hailed as a national hero. Saroja and Karpooram begin a new life, hoping to find redemption. Lakshmi and her father-in-law pay off Narasimman and give her son a good education. Shivaram apologizes to Rahim and asks for forgiveness; Rahim accepts him as a brother. Raja is mourned by Priya and his community, and Ganesh and Seenu see him as a martyr.

== Cast ==
- Silambarasan as Thillai "Cable" Raja
- Bharath as Bharath Chakravarthy
- Prakash Raj as Rahimuddin Qureshi
- Santhanam as Tantanatan Seenu
- Ganesh as "Bhajana" Ganesh
- Anushka Shetty as Saroja
- Sonia Agarwal as Zara Rahim
- Saranya Ponvannan as Lakshmi
- Vega as Laasya
- Jasmin as Priya
- Radha Ravi as Police Inspector
- Jayaprakash as Mansoor Khan
- Ravi Raghavendra as the kidney surgeon
- Ravi Prakash as ACP Shivaram
- Pramila Rani as Raja's mother
- Master Sanjay as Pandi
- Nikki as Karpooram
- Dhandapani as Narasimman
- Sandhya Janak as Bharath's mother

Archival footage from Vedam:

- Brahmanandam as Bhairavan
- Prudhvi Raj as the sub-inspector
- Vajja Venkata Giridhar as Gopi

== Production ==
=== Development ===
By early July 2010, producer R. B. Choudary had bought the rights to Vedam to remake it in Tamil, and two stars were reportedly signed. Actor Silambarasan and VTV Ganesh had seen Vedam at the Casino Theatre in Chennai. They approached Krish, director of Vedam, to direct the remake in his Tamil debut. Silambarasan began shooting for the film in early July, and was also expected to work on Podaa Podi. Silambarasan reportedly lost a project with N. Lingusamy and Dayanidhi Azhagiri, who were unhappy that he began to shoot this film without informing them (and further delaying their film). Krish slightly modified the original script, expanding the Muslim character and changing the musician character.

=== Casting and filming ===
Anushka Shetty was reportedly hesitant to star in the film, and signed because Krish was the director. Shetty denied reports of her hesitancy and confirmed that she would reprise her role from the original: "At no point did I refuse to be a part of this project". Manchu Manoj, expected to reprise his original character and play the rockstar role in Vaanam, opted out and was replaced by Bharath. Sneha Ullal was initially signed to make her Tamil debut with this film and play Silambarasan's love interest. Vega Tamotia was signed to play a rock musician played originally by Lekha Washington, and VTV Ganesh had a cameo role. In September 2010, Sonia Agarwal was signed for a pivotal role, returning to acting after four years and replacing Siya Gautham as Zara (the wife of Prakash Raj's character); Agarwal was initially scheduled to appear in the original version but withdrew due to personal problems. She said that she would have more scenes than the original, and one "extra song".

Manoj Bajpayee was initially considered to reprise his role from Vedam, but Prakash Raj was signed for that role instead. Telugu actor Ravi Prakash reprised his role from the original version for his Tamil film debut. In early 2011, Ullal, who had filmed significant portions, was replaced by Delhi-based model Jasmin Bhasin. Bhasin, who completed her filming in 15 days and dubbed for herself, had auditioned for the rock-musician role of Tamotia. Scenes filmed with Jagan were removed and filmed with Santhanam after Jagan had a falling-out with Silambarasan. Shetty's makeup artist, Nikki, played a transgender person in the film, reprising his role from the original. Krish, who had a cameo appearance in Vedam as a saamiyar, also reprised his role in Vaanam.

== Themes and influences ==
Due to the film's multi-narrative format of several short stories which combine in the climax, it drew similarities to the Mexican film Amores perros (2000), the Tamil film Aayutha Ezhuthu (2004), the American films Crash (2004) and Babel (2006). Malathi Rangarajan of The Hindu noted that Vaanam's ensemble cast has a similar appeal to that of Babel.

== Music ==
Although Krish worked with composer M. M. Keeravani for the score and soundtrack of the original film, Yuvan Shankar Raja wrote Vaanam's original songs and score. The song "Evan Di Unna Pethan" was released as a single to promote the film. The track was released on 1 December 2010 at the Chennai Citi Centre. Vedam's soundtrack has eight tracks; the Vaanam soundtrack has five, including the earlier-released single. It was released on 30 March 2011 at the Residency Towers Chennai.

== Release ==
Vaanam was initially scheduled for release on 11 February 2011, during the Valentine's Day weekend. Its release was postponed, and the film was released on 29 April 2011. The film was distributed by Cloud Nine Movies in Tamil Nadu. With little publicity, Vaanam earned ₹72 lakh in Chennai over its first weekend.

=== Critical response ===
Rediff.com's Pavithra Srinivasan rated the film three out of five and called it "engaging", adding that "if you ignore the minor lapses, you've got a reasonably engaging story, and a moving climax". A Sify reviewer considered the film "very good", saying that "this short story genre [...] manages to work well for the new age audience. Almost all the stories are deftly told, with the mandatory twist in the climax which keeps you riveted". The reviewer praised the director and his team as they "push the cinematic envelope and bring savvy freshness to Tamil cinema". Malathi Rangarajan of The Hindu said, "Pithy, poignant, funny and serious as the situation warrants, dialogue (Gnanagiri) is a highpoint of Vaanam. Climax is another. Krish seems to have cut and pasted a few scenes from the Telugu original – they give a dubbed-film feel to Vaanam. Coming after the stupendous hit, VTV, Vaanam should be another significant film in STR's career".

According to a review in The New Indian Express, "Relaying a warm message of compassion and hope, Vaanam, with its different take, is worth a watch". Baradwaj Rangan wrote that his "glass-half-full side wants to deliver a smallish pat on Vaanam's back and label it [...] a 'praiseworthy attempt', especially within mainstream parameters", while the "glass-half-empty side" was "still shaking angry fists at what could have and should have been a milestone ... Half the story strands are simply not interesting enough".

=== Accolades ===
Silambarasan received the ITFA Best Actor Award, and Santhanam received the Chennai Times Award for Best Actor in a Comic Role.

== Controversies ==
In July 2011, Bharath said that he received little attention for his appearance in Vaanam and was overlooked during its promotions. Although he received favourable publicity for Pattiyal (2006), Bharath alleged that Vaanam emphasised only Silambarasan and called him out. Silambarasan denied any involvement in the film's promotional strategy but hinted that its success was largely dependent on his stardom.

"Evan Di Unna Pethan" was criticised for Silambarasan's allegedly provocative lyrics. A women's-rights organisation in Chennai released a statement stating that the lyrics were "chauvinistic" and "demean women"; they added that "music needs to appeal to larger sections than to the 'thrill-seeking' youth who are often misguided into 'cheap thrills' because of such songs", and the organisation demanded censorship. Several prominent film-industry figures supported Silambarasan, saying that more-objectionable scenes had appeared in past films and there were "bigger issues in society"; censorship was not "the ideal way out in [a] democracy".
