= Size Zero =

2015 Indian film by Prakash Kovelamudi

Size Zero; Inji Iduppazhagi
- Theatrical release poster in Telugu
- Directed by: Prakash Kovelamudi
- Written by: Kanika Dhillon
- Produced by: Prasad V. Potluri
- Starring: Anushka Shetty; Arya; Prakash Raj; Urvashi; Sonal Chauhan
- Cinematography: Nirav Shah
- Edited by: Prawin Pudi
- Music by: M. M. Keeravani
- Production company: PVP Cinema
- Distributed by: PVP Cinema
- Release date: 27 November 2015
- Running time: 131 minutes
- Country: India
- Languages: Telugu; Tamil

Size Zero is a 2015 Indian romantic comedy film directed by Prakash Kovelamudi and written by Kanika Dhillon. The film was simultaneously shot in Telugu and Tamil language versions, the latter titled Inji Iduppazhagi. Produced by Prasad V. Potluri, the film features Anushka Shetty in the lead role while Arya, Prakash Raj, Urvashi and Sonal Chauhan play supporting roles. Tollywood actors like Tamannaah, Rana Daggubati and Kajal Aggarwal make cameos.

Size Zero was theatrically released worldwide on 27 November 2015 alongside its Tamil version, Inji Iduppazhagi.

== Synopsis ==
Soundarya aka Sweety is an overweight, brave, independent woman. She is slightly conscious about her weight but does not let it affect her. She falls in love with Abhishek, who was once a prospective groom for her and now a friend. She later finds out that he is in love with Simran. Sweety is devastated and joins a weight loss clinic called Size Zero as she thinks that her weight is the issue. One of her friends, Jyothi, who is in the clinic with her, develops kidney problems because of the weight loss drugs given in the clinic. Sweety begins a crusade against the clinic. She is joined by Abhi and Simran. Abhi slowly starts to fall for Sweety. The rest of the movie is how Sweety triumphs in her crusade and gets her Abhishek back.

== Cast ==
- Anushka Shetty as "Sweety" Soundarya (voiced by Sowmya Sharma in Telugu, and by Deepa Venkat in Tamil)
- Arya as "Abhi" Abhishek (voiced by Nandu in Telugu version)
- Prakash Raj as "Size Zero" Satyanand
- Sonal Chauhan as Simran
- Pavani Gangireddy as Jyothi
- Urvashi as Rajeswari
- Brahmanandam as Android Baba
- Ali as Bobby
- Gollapudi Maruti Rao as Mouli Thatha
- Rao Ramesh as Sweety's father
- Tanikella Bharani as doctor
- Posani Krishna Murali as Nijam Niranjan
- Master Bharath as Yahoo
- Hema as Neeraja
- Sivannarayana Naripeddi as gym instructor
- Viva Harsha as Sweety's fan
- Sandhya Janak as Abhishek's aunt
- Kireeti Damaraju as prospective groom (Note: Despite being unnamed in the film, he is listed in the credits as "Rohith".)
- Kotesh Manava as prospective groom's father

=== Cameo appearances ===
- Adivi Sesh as Sekhar

as themselves

- Angela Krislinzki in the title song
- Bobby Simha
- Hansika Motwani
- Jiiva
- Kajal Aggarwal
- Lakshmi Manchu
- Nagarjuna
- Rana Daggubati
- Revathi
- Sri Divya
- Tamannaah Bhatia

== Production ==
In February 2015, Prasad V. Potluri announced a new bilingual film venture titled Size Zero, to be directed by Prakash Kovelamudi, which would star Arya and Anushka Shetty. Nirav Shah and M. M. Keeravani were signed on as cinematographer and music composer respectively, while the script was announced to be written by Prakash's wife Kanika. Shruti Haasan was reported to be making an extended guest appearance, while Urvashi and Master Bharath also formed the principal cast. The Tamil version of the film began shoot in March 2015, after a launch ceremony in Chennai. Shruti Haasan soon left the project citing differences with the producers, after a conflict during the making of another film with them. Though it was suggested that she would instead perform an item number in the film instead, she also refuted the claims.

After talks with other actress to replace her including Esha Gupta, Sonal Chauhan subsequently joined the team to play the second female lead role in April 2015. Nagarjuna enacted a guest appearance in the film during the shoot in May 2015, while Jiiva was signed to make a special appearance as well. Dubbing voice for Arya in Telugu was provided by actor Nandu.

Anushka prepared for her role in the film by putting on weight to portray her character.

After shooting several schedules, in early July 2015 some important crucial romantic scenes were being shot between Arya and Shetty at Ramoji Film City in Hyderabad. On 18 July 2015 makers released a press statement stating that the film's shoot was completed.

== Music ==
Size Zero Inji Iduppazhagi

Film score by M. M. Keeravani
- Released: 2015
- Genre: Soundtrack
- Languages: Telugu; Tamil
- Labels: Lahari Music; T-Series

M. M. Keeravani chronology
Baahubali: The Beginning (2015)	Size Zero; Inji Iduppazhagi (2015)	Lacchimdeviki O Lekkundi (2017)

Music is composed by M. M. Keeravani. On 31 August 2015, a teaser was released in which the audio release date was stated as 6 September 2015. But, for unknown reasons makers postponed the audio launch.

Telugu
No.	Title	Singer(s)	Length
1.	"Size Zero"	Neeti Mohan, Ramya Behara, Mounima, Mohana Bhogaraju, Noel Sean
2.	"Mella Mellaga"	Arjun Adapalli
3.	"Cycle"	Ranjith, Adithya
4.	"Mella Mellaga Kallu"	Shweta Pandit
5.	"Size Sexy"	Mohana Bhogaraju
6.	"Innava Innava"	Madhumitha, Ramya Behara, Palak Muchhal

Tamil
No.	Title	Singer(s)	Length
1.	"Size Zero"	Neeti Mohan, Prakash Raj, Rahul, M. M. Keeravani, Noel Sean
2.	"Mella Mella Kalavu"	Kaala Bhairava
3.	"Cycle"	Ranjith, Adithya
4.	"Mella Mella"	Shweta Pandit
5.	"Size Sexy"	NSK Ramya
6.	"Kannaalam"	Damini, Mohana Bhogaraju, Palak Muchhal

== Release ==
Size Zero was initially scheduled for a global release on 2 October 2015, coinciding with Gandhi Jayanti. However, it was postponed to 21 October and finally released on 27 November 2015, alongside the Tamil version titled Inji Iduppazhagi. Prior to the release, Sonal Chauhan, who plays an NRI in the movie, described the movie as a "story with a lot of heart and made by a team of people who sincerely felt for it."

== Reception ==
=== Size Zero ===
Pranita Jonnalagedda of The Times of India rated the film 3 out of 5 and wrote, "Size Zero is slow at times and can go into a sermon mode but then it packs some moments which will make you laugh out loud." Suresh Kavirayani of Deccan Chronicle called the film, "A good concept gone horribly wrong."

=== Inji Iduppazhagi ===
Baradwaj Rangan of The Hindu called it "Lots of minuses in this story of a plus-sized woman" in his review and criticized the film's dubbing.
