= Kanche (soundtrack) =

Soundtrack album by Chirantan Bhatt
- Released: 1 October 2015
- Recorded: 2015
- Genre: Feature film soundtrack
- Length: 28:07
- Language: Telugu
- Label: Aditya Music
- Producer: Chirantan Bhatt

Chirantan Bhatt chronology
Gabbar is Back (2015)	Kanche (2015)	Gautamiputra Satakarni (2017)

Kanche is the soundtrack to the 2015 film of the same name directed by Krish Jagarlamudi, starring Varun Tej, Pragya Jaiswal, and Nikitin Dheer and produced by First Frame Entertainment. The soundtrack features six songs composed by Chirantan Bhatt and lyrics written by Sirivennela Sitaramasastri.

Kanche marked Bhatt's South Indian debut as a composer. Deviating from the musical style he did for Hindi films, Bhatt experimented on the instrumentation and soundscape due to the period setting and predominantly used classical instruments. Most of the songs were composed on Carnatic ragas. The soundtrack to the film was released on 1 October 2015 at a launch event held in Hyderabad, after initial plans to held the launch in Visakhapatnam being deferred. Aditya Music marketed the soundtrack album and distributed to digital and physical formats.

The soundtrack received generally positive reviews from critics, who praised the instrumentation and curation being different from the commercially successful music in Telugu films. The lyrics for the songs were highly praised, with Sitaramasastri winning the Best Lyricist award at Filmfare Awards South, IIFA Utsavam, CineMAA Award, Mirchi Music Awards South and South Indian International Movie Awards.

== Development ==
Krish previously worked with Bhatt on Gabbar Is Back (2015), composing two songs for the film, and asked him to compose a song for Kanche. Impressed with it, Krish signed him as the film's music director, thereby marking Bhatt's debut in South Indian cinema. Bhatt recalled his exposure to Carnatic music while studying for audio engineering in Chennai, which had him the urge to work there. Through Kanche, it made him "understand and appreciate Carnatic music. Unlike Bollywood, where music is expected to be an instant chartbuster, I got to do a lot of melody in this album." Bhatt found the film's story to be "an intense and emotional" and ensured that the music was not generic and in sync with the film's scale, as Krish had a very good music sense. Since the film is set in the early and late-1930s, during World War II, Bhatt found the script to have him great scope to experiment with his work.

Bhatt found the music sessions to be "very organised" in South Indian cinema, compared to the Hindi film music. He recalled that the director, lyricist and composer would sit together and discuss regarding the composition and lyrics, whereas in Bollywood there would be constantly discussing about creating songs that would become commercially successful, and the "oddity factor" works there—even a singer performs out of tune, it was still considered—whereas in South, most of the singers were well versed in Carnatic music.

During the composing sessions, Krish provided Bhatt a few references to the works of Ilaiyaraaja and M. M. Keeravani. Unlike the usual instrumentation that was narrowed down to drums, guitar, piano, pads, and violin, Bhatt used tabla tarang (an Indian melodic percussion instrument consisting of more than ten drums) and sarod (an Indian lute-like stringed instrument) predominantly as he felt that the songs had to "depict a lot of mood and emotions". The songs "Itu Itu Ani Chitikelu Evvarivo", "Bhaga Bhagamani" and "Nijamenani Nammani" were composed using the Natabhairavi, Kamavardani and Charukesi ragas; Bhatt used both Charukesi and Kamavardani ragas for "Raa Mundadugeddam". Shreya Ghoshal performed "Nijamenani Nammani" with Nandini Srikar providing the additional vocals, however, she was not listed in the album credits. Abhay Jodhpurkar initially provided the vocals for the raw cut of the song "Itu Itu Ani Chitikelu Evvarivo", which was recorded in two hours at his friend's studio. Bhatt found his voice apt and retained it in the final version without any further improvements.

One of the "challenging" parts of the film was to curate the music which would justify the war sequences. Bhatt interviewed to Indo-Asian News Service about the film's re-recording, saying that:

"We tried to approach the battle scenes like the way Hollywood would. Some of these war scenes were like nine-minutes long. There’d be a few minutes of lull followed by some aggressive fighting, so we had to constantly innovate with the music to keep the interest level intact."

== Release ==
Kanche's music rights were purchased by Aditya Music. The soundtrack was initially intended to be released on the Ganesh Chaturthi (17 September 2015) and the team chose Visakhapatnam as the venue for the event, due to its connection with World War II. (Note: The Imperial Japanese Army dropped a number of bombs there to target Allied warships. A bomb reportedly failed to explode is still present in a city museum. This eventually served as an inspiration for Krish to develop the script for Kanche.) A teaser of the song "Nijamenani Nammani" was released on YouTube, two days prior. However, the event was postponed due to reasons unknown. Varun Tej later released the song "Itu Itu Ani Chitikelu Evvarivo" sung by Jodhpurkar and Ghoshal at the Radiocity FM station in Hyderabad on the eve of Gandhi Jayanthi (1 October 2015). The soundtrack, marketed by Aditya Music, was released at a promotional event on the same day at Hyderabad with actor Ram Charan in attendance as the guest of honour.

== Track listing ==
All lyrics are written by Sirivennela Sitaramasastri.

No.	Title	Artist(s)	Length
1.	"Itu Itu Ani Chitikelu Evvarivo"	Abhay Jodhpurkar, Shreya Ghoshal	5:11
2.	"Ooru Erayyindi Eru Horettindi"	Shankar Mahadevan	5:11
3.	"Nijamenani Nammani"	Shreya Ghoshal	4:48
4.	"Bhaga Bhagamani"	Vijay Prakash	3:00
5.	"Raa Mundadugeddam"	Vijay Prakash, Keerthi Sagathia	6:49
6.	"Love Is War"	Chirantan Bhatt	3:08
Total length:			28:07

== Release ==
Karthik Srinivasan of The Hindu called "Nijamenani Nammani" the soundtrack's best song and praised the renditions by Ghoshal and Srikar. (Note: Although Srinivasan, mentioned Srikar's contribution to the track, she was not credited on the album.) Srinivasan's another review for Milliblog, regarding the album, said that Kanche is "significantly better than his Hindi output". The Times of India gave the soundtrack 3.5 stars out of 5 and opined that the themed style of the soundtrack is a "delightful change from the song and dance routine seen these days". Behindwoods gave the soundtrack 3.25 stars out of 5 and called it as a "musical and lyrical feast for the ears". IndiaGlitz gave the soundtrack 3.5 stars and called it as a "different musical affair" which is deviated from "the run-of-the-mill Telugu film music"; the review further added despite the familiar themes, the lyrics as "extremely meaning-laden".

== Accolades ==
Award (Note: Awards are in Alphabetical order.)	Date of ceremony (Note: Date is linked to the article about the awards held that year, wherever possible.)	Category	Recipient(s)	Result	Ref.
CineMAA Awards	12 June 2016	Best Background score	Chirrantan Bhatt	Won	
CineMAA Awards	12 June 2016	Best Lyricist	Sirivennela Seetharama Sastry – ("Raa Mundadugeddam")	Won	
Filmfare Awards South	18 June 2016	Best Music Director – Telugu	Chirrantan Bhatt	Nominated	
Filmfare Awards South	18 June 2016	Best Lyricist – Telugu	Sirivennela Seetharama Sastry – ("Raa Mundadugeddam")	Won	
Filmfare Awards South	18 June 2016	Best Male Playback Singer – Telugu	Keerthi Sagathia – ("Neeku Theliyanida")	Nominated	
Filmfare Awards South	18 June 2016	Best Female Playback Singer – Telugu	Shreya Ghoshal – ("Nijamenani")	Nominated	
IIFA Utsavam	28 – 29 March 2017	Best Female Playback Singer – Telugu	Shreya Ghoshal – ("Itu Itu Ani")	Nominated	
Mirchi Music Awards South	27 July 2016	Album of the Year	Kanche – Chirrantan Bhatt	Nominated	
Mirchi Music Awards South	27 July 2016	Music Composer of the Year	Chirrantan Bhatt – ("Itu Itu Ani")	Nominated	
Mirchi Music Awards South	27 July 2016	Lyricist of the Year	Sirivennela Seetharama Sastry – ("Raa Mundadugeddam")	Won	
Mirchi Music Awards South	27 July 2016	Lyricist of the Year	Sirivennela Seetharama Sastry – ("Itu Itu Ani")	Nominated	
Mirchi Music Awards South	27 July 2016	Female Vocalist of the Year	Shreya Ghoshal – ("Nijamenani Nammani")	Nominated	
Mirchi Music Awards South	27 July 2016	Song of the Year	"Itu Itu Ani"	Nominated	
Santosham Film Awards	14 August 2016	Best Lyricist	Sirivennela Seetharama Sastry	Won	
South Indian International Movie Awards	30 June – 1 July 2016	Best Lyricist – Telugu	Sirivennela Seetharama Sastry – ("Itu Itu Ani")	Won	
South Indian International Movie Awards	30 June – 1 July 2016	Best Female Playback Singer – Telugu	Shreya Ghoshal – ("Nijamenani Nammani")	Nominated	
