= Arabia Kadali =

Indian television series by Krish Jagarlamudi

- Promotional release poster
- Genre: Drama
- Showrunner: Krish Jagarlamudi
- Screenplay by: Krish Jagarlamudi; Chintakindi Srinivas Rao
- Story by: Chintakindi Srinivas Rao
- Directed by: V. V. Surya Kumar
- Starring: Satyadev; Anandhi
- Music by: Nagavelli Vidyasagar
- Country of origin: India
- Original language: Telugu
- No. of episodes: 8

Production
- Executive producer: Panguluri Suhasini
- Producers: Y. Rajeev Reddy; J. Sai Babu
- Cinematography: Sameer Reddy
- Editor: Chanakya Reddy Toorupu
- Production company: First Frame Entertainments

Original release
- Network: Amazon Prime Video
- Release: 8 August 2025

Arabia Kadali (transl. Arabian Sea) is an Indian Telugu-language survival drama television series created by Krish Jagarlamudi, who co-wrote with Chintakindi Srinivas Rao. The series is produced by First Frame Entertainments and stars Satyadev and Anandhi in the lead roles.

It was released on Amazon Prime Video on 8 August 2025. The story is based on a real-life incident that occurred in 2018, depicting how Pakistani forces captured the fishermen from Srikakulam, Andhra Pradesh in international waters. Thandel, a film released in February 2025, is also based on the same story.

== Cast ==
- Satyadev as Nuragala Badiri
- Anandhi as Ganga
- Nassar as Susheel Sivaraman
- Raghu Babu as Errababu
- Dalip Tahil as Inayath Khan
- Poonam Bajwa as Dr. Fathima
- Harsh Roshan as Chinna
- Prabhavathi as Poleramma
- Prathyusha Sadhu as Netra Rao
- Kota Jayaram as Nanaji
- Vamsi Krishna as Sekhar
- Bharath Bhatia as Mukund Agarwal
- Chandra Pratap Thakur
- Danish Bhatt as Shabaz Alam
- Ravi Varma as Swaroop
- Amit Tiwari as Saleem
- Nihar Pandya as Hanief
- Alok Jain as Umar Sharief
- Chintakindi Srinivas Rao as Mukhalingam
- Yogi Khatri as Dorababu
- Alapati Lakshmi as Sannamma

== Episodes ==
Episode	Title	Directed by	Written by	Date of Broadcast
1	"Episode 1"	V. V. Surya Kumar	Krish Jagarlamudi & Chintakindi Srinivas Rao	August 8, 2025
2	"Episode 2"	V. V. Surya Kumar	Krish Jagarlamudi & Chintakindi Srinivas Rao	August 8, 2025
3	"Episode 3"	V. V. Surya Kumar	Krish Jagarlamudi & Chintakindi Srinivas Rao	August 8, 2025
4	"Episode 4"	V. V. Surya Kumar	Krish Jagarlamudi & Chintakindi Srinivas Rao	August 8, 2025
5	"Episode 5"	V. V. Surya Kumar	Krish Jagarlamudi & Chintakindi Srinivas Rao	August 8, 2025
6	"Episode 6"	V. V. Surya Kumar	Krish Jagarlamudi & Chintakindi Srinivas Rao	August 8, 2025
7	"Episode 7"	V. V. Surya Kumar	Krish Jagarlamudi & Chintakindi Srinivas Rao	August 8, 2025
8	"Episode 8"	V. V. Surya Kumar	Krish Jagarlamudi & Chintakindi Srinivas Rao	August 8, 2025

== Production ==
Post the release, in August 2025, Satyadev issued a clarification related to the similarity of story with Thandel. The pre-production work of the series began in 2023 and it took time for the team to get approval from Amazon Prime Video and to design the screenplay in an episode-wise format.

== Release ==
Arabia Kadali was released on Amazon Prime Video on 8 August 2025 in Telugu along with dubbed versions in Tamil, Hindi, Kannada and Malayalam languages.

== Reception ==
Rating it 3.5 out of 5, BH Harsh of The New Indian Express praised the dialogues written by Chintakindi Srinivas Rao and cinematography work done by Sameer Reddy, while noting the inconsistent writing. Comparing the narrative design with Krish Jagarlamudi's war film Kanche (2015), T Maruthi Acharya of India Today mentioned that, "the execution doesn't fully match the writing's promise". Scroll.in praised the cinematography and production design while mentioning that the themes are over-explained and stated, "...at times, Arabia Kadali veers into docudrama territory, offering too much fish-ology and exposition". The Hindu has cited that, "Satyadev, Anandhi are the saving grace of this underwhelming drama".
