= Konda Polam =

2021 film directed by Krish

- Theatrical release poster
- Directed by: Krish Jagarlamudi
- Screenplay by: Krish Jagarlamudi
- Story by: Sannapureddy Venkata Rami Reddy
- Based on: Konda Polam (novel) by Rami Reddy
- Produced by: Saibabu Jagarlamudi; Yeduguru Rajeev Reddy
- Starring: Panja Vaisshnav Tej; Rakul Preet Singh
- Cinematography: Gnana Shekar V. S.
- Edited by: Shravan Katikaneni
- Music by: M. M. Keeravani
- Production company: First Frame Entertainments
- Distributed by: Bridge Films (India); Great India Films (United States); Dreamz Entertainment Limited (United Kingdom)
- Release date: 8 October 2021
- Running time: 142 minutes
- Country: India
- Language: Telugu

Konda Polam (transl. Hillside farm) is a 2021 Indian Telugu-language jungle adventure film directed by Krish Jagarlamudi. Produced by First Frame Entertainments, it stars Panja Vaisshnav Tej and Rakul Preet Singh while Sai Chand, Kota Srinivasa Rao and Nassar play supporting roles. The film is an adaptation of the eponymous novel by Sannapureddy Venkata Rami Reddy. Konda Polam was released on 8 October 2021 and ended up as a commercial failure.

== Plot ==
Kataru Ravindra Yadav "Ravi" has passed the Indian Forest Service exam conducted by UPSC with top marks. During the interview in Delhi, the panel asks him why he wants to join the Indian Forest Service.

In the past, Ravi was the only educated man in his village of shepherds, but he could not find a job despite searching for four years in Hyderabad due to his lack of confidence. Finally, upon his grandfather's insistence, he decided to help his father Guruvappa's profession because his father did not allow Ravi's newly married elder brother to do so. So he allowed Ravi to come with him.

During the drought, the situation forces them to take the sheep to forests for pastures to feed the sheep and water to drink for 40 days (this system is called Kondapolam). At first, he is a scared fish out of water amidst the shepherds in the forests and hills they travel through. However, he meets Obulamma "Obu," a fearless and kind young orphan woman staying with her grandfather, who helps him learn about shepherding and nature along with the other shepherds. Their journey is hazardous as they face tigers, sandalwood smugglers, goat thieves, limited food and water supplies, and the risk of not being able to find a suitable environment for the goats to graze. Ravi learns quickly and uses his newfound skills to fight these threats.

Eventually, Ravi and Obu fall in love, but Ravi's father insists that he stay away from her due to his unemployment and remembers him, her grandfather's wish that Obu should be married to a stable job person, so he rejects her advances.

Finally, Ravi comes face to face with the tiger and, reflecting on his previous lack of initiative, bravely stands up to it and makes it flee.

Back in the interview, Ravi explains that the tiger is very quick to nab the neck of an animal that is bending its spine. But coming to humans, it became a puzzle to the tiger because for a human who always stands straight and confident, the tiger doesn't know how to catch the human's neck. Like the way he also came from, the past four years bended in front of the world with the fear and lack of confidence. With this experience, the tiger gave him a confidence that was not in his life before.

Later, he got the corporate job he dreams for, but he was not satisfied with the job. He resigns it and prepares for IFoS because he wants to serve in the forest to help his village, solve their problems, and protect the forest from the thieves legally. Leaving the interviewers pleased and impressed, he becomes a Divisional Forest Officer (DFO) and returns to his village amidst pomp and splendor. Ravi declares his love for Obu, and the two embrace.

== Cast ==
- Panja Vaisshnav Tej as Kataru Ravindranath Yadav "Ravi" later becomes an IFoS
- Rakul Preet Singh as Obulamma "Obu"
- Sai Chand as Guravappa, Ravi's father
- Kota Srinivasa Rao as Ravi's grandfather
- Nassar as Head of UPSC Interview panel (Cameo Appearance)
- Annapurna as Ravi's grandmother
- Hema as a villager
- Anthony
- Ravi Prakash as Ankayenna
- Syamala as Subhadra, Ankayenna's wife (Cameo Appearance)
- Mahesh Vitta as Bhaskar
- Racha Ravi as Siripellu
- Ashok Vardhan
- Anand Vihari
- Pranitha as Ravi's sister
- Udhbav Raghunandhan as Ravi's elder brother
- Siddharth Gollapudi as Interviewer

== Production ==
Konda Polam novel was recommended to Krish by Director Mohan Krishna Indraganti. After reading this novel he decided to make a film on this. In 2020, Krish acquired the rights of novel by Sannapureddi Venkata Ramireddy. He adapted the novel into a theatrical extravaganza, casting Panja Vaishnav Tej and Rakul Preet Singh in the lead. In September 2020, it was reported that Rakul Preet Singh resumed the shooting of the film which was being shot in Vikarabad, Telangana forest. This film's major part was shot during lockdown 1 under biobubble with limited cast and crew. In an interview Krish said, “During famines, many people from the shepherding community go to forest areas along with their sheep for their livelihood. This process is called 'Konda Polam'. We will be showcasing this adventurous journey very clearly in this film.” In the novel there is no character called Obulamma; he wrote the character for the film, to get into a commercial template he added.

== Soundtrack ==
Konda Polam

Soundtrack album by M. M. Keeravani
- Released: 2 October 2021
- Genre: Feature film soundtrack
- Length: 25:10
- Language: Telugu
- Label: Mango Music

M. M. Keeravani chronology
12 'O' Clock (2021)	Konda Polam (2021)	Pelli SandaD (2021)

Official audio
- Konda Polam - Full Album on YouTube

The soundtrack is composed by M. M. Keeravani and lyrics are penned by Keeravaani, Chandrabose, and Sirivennela Seetharama Sastry. "Obulamma", the first track of the soundtrack, released on 27 August 2021 by Mango Music. "Shwaasalo", the second track, was released on 30 September. The soundtrack album was launched in an event held at Kurnool, Andhra Pradesh on 2 October 2021.

The film marks Shreya Ghoshal collaborating with Keeravani after over a decade, as their last collaboration was Badrinath, where Ghoshal sung the song "Chiranjeeva". The song "Dham Dham Dham" from the film won Chandrabose the National Film Award for Best Lyrics at the 69th National Film Awards.

Track listing
No.	Title	Lyrics	Singer(s)	Length
1.	"Obulamma"	M. M. Keeravani	Satya Yamini, P V N S Rohit	3:36
2.	"Tala Etthu"	Sirivennela Seetharama Sastry	M. M. Keeravani, Harika Narayan, Sri Soumya Varanasi	3:09
3.	"Dham Dham Dham"	Chandrabose	Rahul Sipligunj, Damini Bhatla	4:38
4.	"Kadhalu Kadhaluga"	M. M. Keeravani	Kailash Kher, Yamini Ghantasala	3:56
5.	"Daarulu Daarulu"	Sirivennela Seetharama Sastry	M. M. Keeravani, Harika Narayan	2:48
6.	"Shwaasalo"	M. M. Keeravani	Yamini Ghantasala, PVNS Rohit	3:31
7.	"Chettekki"	Chandrabose	Kaala Bhairava, Shreya Ghoshal	3:32
Total length:				25:10

== Reception ==
The film received mixed-to-positive reviews, with praise for the unique story, visuals, and acting, with the use of body language and eyes being particularly noticed. However, the pacing and length were criticized, with the need for certain scenes and a musical duet being questioned. On the review aggregator website Rotten Tomatoes, 80% of 5 critics' reviews are positive, with an average rating of 7/10.

Neeshita Nyayapati of The Times of India gave 3.5/5 stars and wrote, "Konda Polam might have its moments where it misses the mark but it gets more things right than wrong." Sankeertana Varma of Firstpost gave 3.5/5 stars and wrote, "While Konda Polam is definitely a story of a man coming of age and realising his priorities, it lacks the ‘epicness’ it foretells." Haricharan Pudipeddi of Hindustan Times wrote, "The only downside of Konda Polam is that it tries to address multiple conflicts. In the process, the impact that it intends to make is diluted."

=== Box office ===
Commercially, the film lost money in theatres but recovered its budget from satellite and streaming rights, with Amazon Prime Video buying the film's streaming rights for ₹3.5 crore.
