= First Frame Entertainments =

Indian film production company

First Frame Entertainments Private Limited
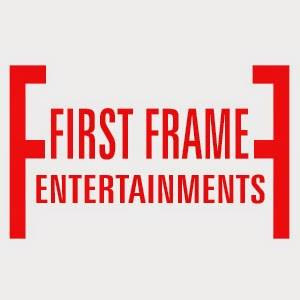
- Logo of First Frame Entertainments Pvt. Ltd
- Type: Private
- Industry: Entertainment
- Founded: 30 January 2009
- Headquarters: Jubilee Hills, Hyderabad, India
- Key people: Rajeev Reddy Yeduguru; Radhakrishna Jagarlamudi; Sai Babu Jagarlamudi; Suhasini Panguluri
- Products: Films
- Services: Film production
- Website: First Frame Entertainments

First Frame Entertainments is an Indian film and television production company, founded by Rajeev Reddy Yeduguru, and Sai Babu Jagarlamudi. Established in Hyderabad in 2006, the production house is one of the active in Tollywood with nine films, including Kanche (2015).

== Film production ==
Year	Film	Director
2006	Sambhavami Yuge Yuge	Ravi Varma
2008	Gamyam	Krish
2012	Krishnam Vande Jagadgurum	Krish
2015	Dagudumootha Dandakor	R. K. Malineni
2015	Kanche	Krish
2017	Gautamiputra Satakarni	Krish
2018	Antariksham 9000 KMPH	Sankalp Reddy
2020	Run	Lakshmikanth Chenna
2021	Konda Polam	Krish
2021	Nootokka Jillala Andagadu	Rachakonda Vidyasagar
2025	Ghaati	Krish
2026	Korean Kanakaraju	Merlapaka Gandhi

== Television production ==
Year	Series	Director	Network
2009	Puttadi Bomma	RK Malineni	ETV
2012	Swathi Chinukulu	Raghu Kapuganti	ETV
2015	Tene Manasulu	Kola Nageswar Rao	ETV
2016	Jantar Mantar	Kola Nageswar Rao	ETV
2019	Kanchana Mala	Kanth	ETV
2020	Masti's	Ajay Bhuyan	Aha
2022	9 Hours	Niranjan Kaushik, Jacob Varghese	Disney+ Hotstar
2025	Arabia Kadali	V. V. Surya Kumar	Amazon Prime Video

== Awards ==
Ceremony	Category	Nominee	Result
National Film Awards	Best Feature Film Telugu	Kanche	Won
Filmfare Awards South	Filmfare Award for Best Film – Telugu	Gamyam	Won
Nandi Awards	Nandi Award for Best Feature Film	Gamyam	Won
