= Gautamiputra Satakarni (film) =

2017 Indian film by Krish Jagarlamudi

- Theatrical release poster
- Directed by: Krish Jagarlamudi
- Written by: Krish Jagarlamudi
- Dialogues by: Sai Madhav Burra
- Based on: Gautamiputra Satakarni
- Produced by: Yeduguru Rajeev Reddy; Saibabu Jagarlamudi
- Starring: Nandamuri Balakrishna; Shriya Saran; Hema Malini
- Cinematography: Gnana Shekar V. S.
- Edited by: Suraj Jagtap; Rama Krishna Arram
- Music by: Chirantan Bhatt
- Production company: First Frame Entertainments
- Release date: 12 January 2017
- Running time: 135 mins
- Country: India
- Language: Telugu
- Box office: ₹78.60 crore

Gautamiputra Satakarni (transl. Satakarni, son of Gautami) is a 2017 Indian Telugu-language epic historical action film written and directed by Krish. The film was produced by Y. Rajeev Reddy, Jagarlamudi Saibabu on First Frame Entertainment banner. Based on the life of 2nd century CE Satavahana ruler Gautamiputra Satakarni, the film stars Nandamuri Balakrishna in the title role, alongside Shriya Saran, and Hema Malini. It marks Balakrishna's 100th film as an actor. The music is composed by Chirantan Bhatt.

Gautamiputra Satakarni was a commercial success at the box office, grossing ₹78.60 crore worldwide.

== Cast ==
- Nandamuri Balakrishna as Gautamiputra Satakarni
- Shriya Saran as Vasishthi Devi, Satakarni's wife
- Hema Malini as Gautami Balasri, Satakarni's mother
- Kabir Bedi as Nahapana
- Milind Gunaji as Kanji
- David Manucharov as Demetrius
- Farah Karimaee as Athena
- Ravi Prakash as Gandaraya
- Tanikella Bharani as Deva Dattudu, Satakarni's messenger
- Subhalekha Sudhakar as Satakarni's messenger who is killed by Nahapana
- Master Snehith Chowdary as Vasishthiputra Pulumavi, Satakarni's elder son
- Goparaju Ramana
- Shiva Rajkumar as Kalahasteeshwara (cameo appearance)

== Soundtrack ==
Gautamiputra Satakarni

Film score by Chirantan Bhatt
- Released: 26 December 2016
- Recorded: 2016
- Genre: Soundtrack
- Length: 19:56
- Label: Lahari Music
- Producer: Chirantan Bhatt

Chirantan Bhatt chronology
Kanche (2015)	Gautamiputra Satakarni (2016)	Jolly LLB 2 (2017)

Music composed by Chirantan Bhatt. Music released on Lahari Music Company. The Audio launch was held at Sri Pandit Jawaharlal Nehru Municipal High School Grounds, Tirupati on 26 December 2016. Central Minister Venkaiah Naidu, Andhra Pradesh Chief Minister Nara Chandrababu Naidu attended the function.

No.	Title	Lyrics	Singer(s)	Length
1.	"Ekimeedaa"	Sirivennela Sitarama Sastry	Udit Narayan, Shreya Ghoshal	3:46
2.	"Gana Gana Gana"	Sirivennela Sitarama Sastry	Simha, Anand Bhaskar, Vamsi	3:25
3.	"Mrignayanaa"	Sirivennela Sitarama Sastry	S. P. Balasubrahmanyam, Shreya Ghoshal	4:57
4.	"Saaho Saarvabowma Saaho"	Sirivennela Sitarama Sastry	Vijay Prakash, Keerthi Sagathia	3:25
5.	"Singhamu Pai Langhinchenu (Kadhaa Gaanam)"	Sai Madhav	Vijay Prakash	4:23
Total length:				20:33

== Production ==
The film was officially announced on 8 April 2016, on eve of Ugadi at Andhra Pradesh's proposed capital city Amaravati. The movie opening was held at Hyderabad on 22 April 2016, with eminent personalities like K. Chandrasekhar Rao, T. Harish Rao, Chiranjeevi, Venkatesh, K. Raghavendra Rao, Dasari Narayana Rao, Singeetam Srinivasa Rao, Boyapati Srinu, Sai Korrapati, Sriwass, and Akkineni Ramesh Prasad in attendance. The search for the female lead had been going on for long, as actresses like Anushka Shetty and Nayanthara were on the verge of signing. Finally, actress Shriya Saran was signed on as the lead heroine, after being successful in Telugu with various projects. Veteran Hindi actress Hema Malini is playing Balakrishna's character's mother, Gautami Balasri. Actually Devi Sri Prasad was initially selected as music director; he was replaced by Chirantan Bhatt. Neeta Lulla is designing costumes and jewellery for the film.

Nandamuri Balakrishna gave Hema Malini a saree on the sets of the film on 4 September 2016 in Rajasthan. The film's first look teaser was released on 11 October 2016 at 10:15 a.m on the occasion of Vijayadashami and trailer was launched on 16 December 2016 at Tirumala theatre in Karimnagar, Telangana.

== Release ==
It was released on 12 January 2017 across 1320 screens worldwide.

== Reception ==
Srivathsan Nadadhur of The Hindu gives it a 4/5 rating saying, "The film talks of Telugu identity, re-emphasises Amaravati’s cultural significance, talks of a borderless society, gives Shriya a role of a lifetime and yet remains a Balakrishna film, an achievement for Krish in only his seventh outing." Murali Krishna of Telangana Today says "Gautamiputra Satakarni perfectly blends with the persona of Balakrishna. It is an achievement to bring the lesser-known details of an unsung hero to spotlight and Krish has succeeded in crafting a gripping narrative right from the word go". 10TV editor Kathi Mahesh gives it a 4/5 rating saying, "You will know about the Telugu's history and how they contributed to the nation." IdleBrain Jeevi gives it a 3.25/5 rating and says "a film like Gautamiputra Satakarni should be encouraged by watching in theaters because it introduces us our own Telugu hero who ruled the unified nation."

HMTV Film bureau chief Prabhu praised the film saying "Krish gave a movie which would make Telugus proud and Balakrishna acted in it" and gave it a rating of 4/5 but adds that instead of numbers this is a movie to be visited/reviewed in a different way. Suresh Kavirayani of Deccan Chronicle gives it a 3.5/5 rating saying "Gautamiputra Satakarni is an original story and everyone, especially the Telugu population, should know about it. Krish should be appreciated for coming up with a script like this and narrating it interestingly. The film is also memorable for its content and the excellent performance by Balayya. Kannada superstar Shiva Rajkumar appears in a cameo and stuns in it.". H Kumar of Firstpost says "Gautamiputra Satakarni is part inspirational, part patriotic that implores Telugu-speaking populace across the world to be proud of their roots. And in doing so, Krish has once again proved himself to be a fascinating storyteller who isn't afraid to walk a less-traveled path."

== Awards and nominations ==
Date	Award	Category	Nominee	Result	Ref
13 May 2018	49th Cinegoers Awards	Best Actor	Nandamuri Balakrishna	Won	
13 May 2018	49th Cinegoers Awards	Best Director	Krish	Won	
13 May 2018	49th Cinegoers Awards	Best Dialogue Writer	Sai Madhav Burra	Won	
16 June 2018	65th Filmfare Awards South	Best Film – Telugu	First Frame Entertainments	Nominated	
16 June 2018	65th Filmfare Awards South	Best Director – Telugu	Krish	Nominated	
16 June 2018	65th Filmfare Awards South	Best Actor – Telugu	Nandamuri Balakrishna	Nominated	
26 August 2018	16th Santosham Film Awards	Best Actress	Shriya Saran	Won	
26 August 2018	16th Santosham Film Awards	Best Dialogue Writer	Sai Madhav Burra	Won	
14 & 15 September 2018	7th South Indian International Movie Awards	Best Film – Telugu	First Frame Entertainments	Nominated	
14 & 15 September 2018	7th South Indian International Movie Awards	Best Director – Telugu	Krish	Nominated	
14 & 15 September 2018	7th South Indian International Movie Awards	Best Actor – Telugu	Nandamuri Balakrishna	Nominated	
14 & 15 September 2018	7th South Indian International Movie Awards	Best Actress in a Supporting Role – Telugu	Hema Malini	Nominated	
14 & 15 September 2018	7th South Indian International Movie Awards	Critics' choice Best Actor – Telugu	Nandamuri Balakrishna	Won	
17 February 2019	TSR – TV9 National Film Awards	Best Film – Telugu	First Frame Entertainments	Won	
17 February 2019	TSR – TV9 National Film Awards	Best Actor – Telugu	Nandamuri Balakrishna	Won	
17 February 2019	TSR – TV9 National Film Awards	Best Director – Telugu	Krish	Won	
