= Sai Madhav Burra =

Indian screenwriter

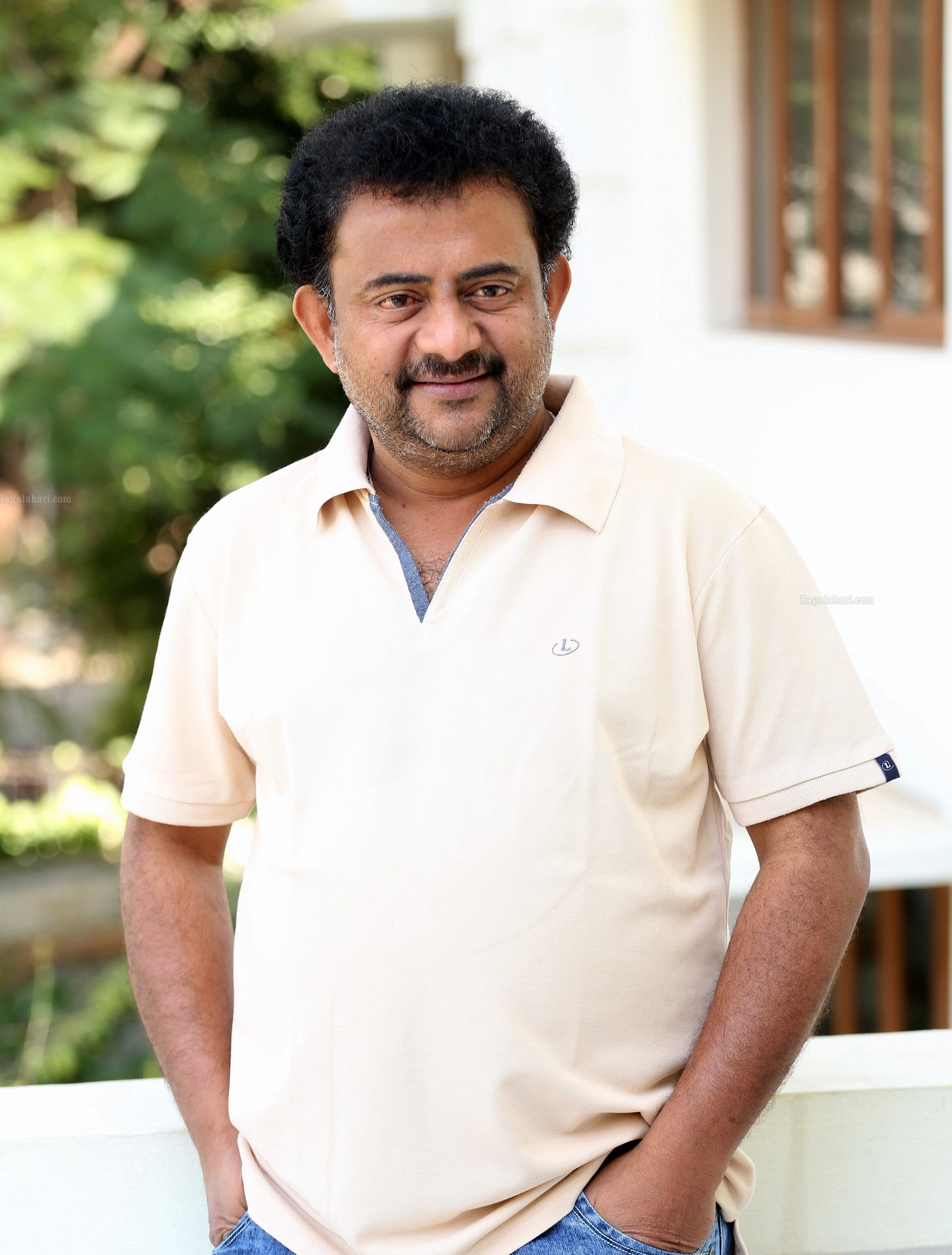
- Burra in 2019
- Born: Sai Madhav Burra; 1973 or 1974 (age 52–53); Tenali, Andhra Pradesh, India
- Occupation: Screenwriter
- Years active: 2013–present

Sai Madhav Burra (born 1973) is an Indian dialogue writer and screenwriter who works in Telugu cinema. He wrote dialogues for films such as Krishnam Vande Jagadgurum (2012). Malli Malli Idi Rani Roju (2015), Kanche (2015), Gopala Gopala (2015), Khaidi No. 150 (2017), Gautamiputra Satakarni (2017) and RRR (2022).

== Filmography ==
=== As dialogue writer ===
Year	Title	Notes
2007	Sri Satya Narayana Swamy	
2012	Krishnam Vande Jagadgurum	
2015	Gopala Gopala	
2015	Malli Malli Idi Rani Roju	Nandi Award Best Dialogue writer
2015	Dongaata	
2015	Kanche	
2015	Raju Gari Gadhi	
2016	Sardaar Gabbar Singh	
2017	Gauthamiputra Satakarni	Santosham Best Dialogue Award
2017	Khaidi No. 150	
2017	Kittu Unnadu Jagratha	
2018	Manasuku Nachindi	
2018	Mahanati	
2018	Sakshyam	
2018	Sarabha	
2019	N.T.R: Kathanayakudu	
2019	N.T.R: Mahanayakudu	
2019	Sye Raa Narasimha Reddy	
2019	Raju Gari Gadhi 3	
2021	Krack	
2021	Sreekaram	
2021	Aakashavaani	
2021	Gamanam	
2022	RRR	Santosham Best Dialogue Award
2022	The Warriorr	
2023	Veera Simha Reddy	
2023	Shaakuntalam	
2023	Shanthala	
2024	Operation Valentine	
2024	Kalki 2898 AD	
2024	Devaki Nandana Vasudeva	
2025	Game Changer	
2025	Hari Hara Veera Mallu: Part 1	
2025	Ghaati	
2025	Jaat	Debut in Hindi cinema, co-dialogue writer
2026	Seetha Payanam	

=== As story writer ===
- S Saraswathi (2026)
