= Dagudumootha Dandakor =

- Movie Poster
- Directed by: R. K. Malineni
- Screenplay by: R. K. Malineni
- Story by: A. L. Vijay
- Based on: Saivam
- Produced by: Ramoji Rao; Krish (presents)
- Starring: Rajendra Prasad; Sara Arjun
- Cinematography: Gnana Shekar V. S.
- Edited by: Dharmendra Kakarala
- Music by: E. S. Murthy
- Production companies: Ushakiran Movies; First Frame Entertainment
- Distributed by: Sri Venkateswara Creations
- Release date: 9 May 2015
- Running time: 109 minutes
- Country: India
- Language: Telugu

Dagudumootha Dandakor is a 2015 Indian Telugu-language comedy drama film, produced by Ramoji Rao on Ushakiran Movies & First Frame Entertainment banner, presented by director Krish and directed by R. K. Malineni. Starring Rajendra Prasad, Sara Arjun and music composed by E. S. Murthy. The film is remake of the Tamil movie Saivam (2014).

== Cast ==
- Rajendra Prasad as Rajugaru
- Sara Arjun as Bangaram
- Master Vinay Pavan as Sanyasi Raju "Sunny"
- Siddhartha Varma as Siddu
- Nithya Shetty as Madhu
- Ravi Prakash as Hari
- Ravi Varma as Prakash
- Prabhu as Sridhar
- Sri Harsha as Murali
- Getup Srinu as Bhatraju
- Satyam Rajesh as Attender
- Raja Babu as Subba Raju
- Meka Ramakrishna as Priest
- Raghu Karumanchi as Police Inspector
- JVR as Satti Babu
- Babu as Errababu
- Merinatara as Meenakshi
- Sandhya Jhanak as Annapurna
- Parvati as Lakshmi
- Prathiksha as Suguna
- Roopa Sri as Pavani
- Roopa Devi as Jayamma
- Lakshmi Sri as Manga
- Master Abhiram as Babu

== Soundtrack ==
Dagudumootha Dandakor

Film score by E. S. Murthy
- Released: 30 January 2015
- Genre: Soundtrack
- Length: 18:30
- Label: Aditya Music
- Producer: E. S. Murthy

Music composed and lyrics were written by E. S. Murthy. The music was released under the Aditya Music label. The movie's audio was launched on 30 January 2015 at Ramoji Film City in Hyderabad, by Ramoji Rao and A. L. Vijay, director of the original film, who was the chief guest at the event.

No.	Title	Singer(s)	Length
1.	"Evaru Nearparu"	Madhu Balakrishnan, Uthara Unnikrishnan	3:34
2.	"Manishi Manishini"	Naren Allam, Gayatri, Jayasri, Priya Himesh	4:21
3.	"Na Ellu Na Vallu"	E. S. Murthy, Uthara Unnikrishnan	4:09
4.	"Kokko Kokko"	Sirivennela Sitarama Sastry, Balaji, Sai Charan, Yogiswar Sharma, Ashwini, Sindhuri, Sisira	3:23
5.	"Dagudumuthala Jathara"	Music Bit	3:01
Total length:			18:30

== Themes and influences ==
Unlike the norm, the film spoke out about animal cruelty despite being set in a village.
