= Krish Jagarlamudi =

Indian film director (born 1978)

- Born: Radhakrishna Jagarlamudi; 10 November 1978 (age 47); Guntur, Andhra Pradesh, India
- Occupations: Film director; screenwriter
- Years active: 2008–present

Radhakrishna "Krish" Jagarlamudi (born 10 November 1978) is an Indian film director and screenwriter who works predominantly in Telugu cinema in addition to Hindi and Tamil films. He has earned numerous accolades throughout his career including a National Film Award and two Filmfare Awards South.

Krish began his career in 2008 with the road film Gamyam and followed it up with the hyperlink film Vedam in 2010, both of which gained critical acclaim and big accolades. In 2015, he helmed the period war drama Kanche set in Nazi Germany, which won the National Film Award for Best Feature Film in Telugu.

His other notable films include Vaanam (2011), Krishnam Vande Jagadgurum (2012), Gabbar Is Back (2015), Gautamiputra Satakarni (2017) and Manikarnika: The Queen of Jhansi (2019). In 2019, he also directed the back-to-back filmed biographical dramas NTR: Mahanayakudu and NTR: Kathanayakudu and in 2020 he started filming a historical fiction movie of an outlaw Hari Hara Veera Mallu with Pawan Kalyan. He is collaborating with Anushka Shetty for her 50th Film Ghaati, they previously worked in Vedam and Vaanam.

== Early life ==
Krish Jagarlamudi was born on 10 November 1978 in Guntur, Andhra Pradesh, India. He completed his higher education in the United States in pharmacy and computer science, and briefly worked there. He returned to India to pursue a full-time career in the film industry.

== Career ==
In 2008, Krish Jagarlamudi made his debut with Gamyam, starring Allari Naresh, Sharwanand, and Kamalinee Mukherjee. The film was produced by his father, Saibabu Jagarlamudi, along with his brother-in-law, Bibo Srinivas, and his friend, Rajeev Reddy, who came forward after Krish tried to convince many notable film producers. The film went on to become a big hit at the box office, and won several awards, including the Best Picture and Best Director awards at the 2009 South Filmfare Awards. It gained a cult status and is considered by many to be one of the greatest films in Telugu ever made.

Krish's next film, Vedam (2010) is anthology starring Allu Arjun, Anushka Shetty and Manoj Manchu. It was well received by both critics and the audience, winning four major awards at the 58th Filmfare Awards South, with Krish receiving his second Filmfare Award for Best Director. Vedam was also the second film to win all the four major awards (Best Movie, Best Director for Krish, Best Actor for Allu Arjun and Best Actress for Anushka Shetty), after Jeevana Jyothi in 1975 and had a good run at the box office as well.

Following the success of Vedam, Krish was signed on to direct its Tamil remake, titled Vaanam, starring Silambarasan Rajendar, Bharath, and Anushka Shetty, reprising her role. Like its original version, Vaanam too released to critical acclaim. His next film is Krishnam Vande Jagadgurum (2012) starring Rana Daggubati and Nayantara. Krish made his Hindi debut film with Gabbar Is Back (2015). It stars Akshay Kumar, Kareena Kapoor and Shruti Haasan.

His World war II war directorial starring Varun Tej named Kanche, released on 22 October, on the occasion of Dasara. It received positive reviews from critics and was successful at the box office. Kanche was selected for the Indiwood Panorama Competition section at the 2nd edition of Indiwood Carnival 2016 in Hyderabad. He next directed Nandamuri Balakrishna's 100th film, Gautamiputra Satakarni (2017), based on emperor Gautamiputra Satakarni. The film was commercially successful.

Krish, next started directing Manikarnika: The Queen of Jhansi, then after with the personal request of Nandamuri Balakrishna, Krish collaborated with Balakrishna once again for the NTR duology, based on the life of N. T. Rama Rao. Both the parts, NTR: Kathanayakudu and NTR: Mahanayakudu, were critical and commercial failures.

== Filmography ==
=== Film ===
Key
| † | Denotes films that have not yet been released |

| Year | Film | Language | Notes | Ref. |
|---|---|---|---|---|
| 2008 | Gamyam | Telugu | | |
| 2010 | Vedam | Telugu | | |
| 2011 | Vaanam | Tamil | Remake of Vedam | |
| 2012 | Krishnam Vande Jagadgurum | Telugu | | |
| 2015 | Gabbar Is Back | Hindi | | |
| 2015 | Kanche | Telugu | | |
| 2017 | Gautamiputra Satakarni | Telugu | | |
| 2019 | NTR: Kathanayakudu | Telugu | | |
| 2019 | Manikarnika: The Queen of Jhansi | Hindi | Also directed by Kangana Ranaut | |
| 2019 | NTR: Mahanayakudu | Telugu | | |
| 2021 | Konda Polam | Telugu | | |
| 2025 | Hari Hara Veera Mallu | Telugu | Also directed by A. M. Jyothi Krishna | |
| 2025 | Ghaati | Telugu | | |

Cameo appearances

| Year | Film | Role | Language | Notes |
|---|---|---|---|---|
| 2008 | Gamyam | naxalite | Telugu | |
| 2009 | Kadhalna Summa Illai | naxalite | Tamil | remake of Gamyam |
| 2010 | Vedam | sadhu | Telugu | |
| 2011 | Vaanam | sadhu | Tamil | remake of Vedam |
| 2015 | Gabbar is Back | Inspector (in jail with gabbar) | Hindi | |
| 2018 | Mahanati | K. V. Reddy | Telugu | |
| 2019 | NTR: Kathanayakudu | K. V. Reddy | Telugu | |

As presenter

- Dagudumootha Dandakor (2015)

=== Television ===
| Year | Title | Creator | Writer | Network | Ref. |
|---|---|---|---|---|---|
| 2020 | Masti's | Yes | Yes | Aha | |
| 2022 | 9 Hours | Yes | Yes | Disney+ Hotstar | |
| 2025 | Arabia Kadali | Yes | Screenplay | Amazon Prime Video | |

=== Frequent collaborators ===
| Artist | Gamyam | Vedam | Vaanam | Krishnam Vande Jagadgurum | Gabbar Is Back | Kanche | Gautamiputra Satakarni | NTR: Kathanayakudu | NTR: Mahanayakudu | Manikarnika: The Queen of Jhansi | Konda Polam | Masti's | 9 Hours | Hari Hara Veera Mallu | Ghaati |
|---|---|---|---|---|---|---|---|---|---|---|---|---|---|---|---|
| Ravi Prakash | Yes | Yes | Yes | Yes | Yes | Yes | Yes | Yes | | Yes | Yes | | Yes | | |
| Gnana Shekar V. S. | | Yes | Yes | Yes | | Yes | Yes | Yes | Yes | Yes | Yes | | | | |
| Sai Madhav Burra | | | | Yes | | Yes | Yes | Yes | Yes | | | | | | |
| M. M. Keeravani | | Yes | | | | | | Yes | Yes | | Yes | | | Yes | |

== Awards and nominations ==
List of awards and nominations received by Krish.

CineMAA Awards

| Year | Film | Category | Result | Ref. |
|---|---|---|---|---|
| 2016 | Kanche | CineMAA Award for Best Director | Nominated | |
| 2016 | Kanche | CineMAA Award for Best Story | Won | |
| 2016 | Kanche | CineMAA Award – Special Appreciation Award | Won | |

Filmfare Awards South

| Year | Film | Category | Result | Ref. |
|---|---|---|---|---|
| 2009 | Gamyam | Filmfare Award for Best Director – Telugu | Won | |
| 2011 | Vedam | Filmfare Award for Best Director – Telugu | Won | |
| 2013 | Krishnam Vande Jagadgurum | Filmfare Award for Best Director – Telugu | Nominated | |
| 2016 | Kanche | Filmfare Award for Best Director – Telugu | Nominated | |
| 2018 | Gautamiputra Satakarni | Filmfare Award for Best Director – Telugu | Nominated | |

IIFA Utsavam

| Year | Film | Category | Result | Ref. |
|---|---|---|---|---|
| 2017 | Kanche | IIFA Utsavam Award for Best Director – Telugu | Nominated | |
| 2017 | Kanche | IIFA Utsavam Award for Best Story – Telugu | Won | |

Nandi Awards

| Year | Film | Category | Result | Ref. |
|---|---|---|---|---|
| 2008 | Gamyam | Nandi Award for Best Director | Won | |

National Film Awards

| Year | Film | Category | Result | Ref. |
|---|---|---|---|---|
| 2016 | Kanche | National Film Award for Best Feature Film in Telugu | Won | |

Producers Guild Film Awards

| Year | Film | Category | Result | Ref. |
|---|---|---|---|---|
| 2016 | Gabbar Is Back | Producers Guild Film Award for Best Debut Director | Nominated | |

South Indian International Movie Awards

| Year | Film | Category | Result | Ref. |
|---|---|---|---|---|
| 2016 | Kanche | SIIMA Award for Best Film (Telugu) | Nominated | |
| 2018 | Gautamiputra Satakarni | SIIMA Award for Best Film (Telugu) | Nominated | |

TSR – TV9 National Film Awards

| Year | Film | Category | Result | Ref. |
|---|---|---|---|---|
| 2017 | Kanche | Best Director – Special Jury Award | Won | |
| 2019 | Gautamiputra Satakarni | Best Director | Won | |

Zee Cine Awards Telugu

| Year | Film | Category | Result | Ref. |
|---|---|---|---|---|
| 2017 | Zee Cine Awards Telugu | Zee Telugu Golden Award for Favorite Director | Gautamiputra Satakarni | Won |
| 2019 | Zee Cine Awards Telugu | Dasari Award (Special Appreciation Award) | NTR: Kathanayakudu | Won |
