= Gamyam =

2008 film by Krish

- Promotional poster
- Directed by: Krish Jagarlamudi
- Screenplay by: Krish Jagarlamudi
- Dialogue by: Nagaraju Gandham
- Story by: Krish Jagarlamudi
- Produced by: Saibabu Jagarlamudi
- Starring: Allari Naresh; Sharwanand; Kamalinee Mukherjee
- Cinematography: Hari Anumolu
- Edited by: Shravan Katikaneni
- Music by: E. S. Murthy; R. Anil
- Production company: First Frame Entertainment
- Release date: 29 February 2008
- Running time: 128 minutes
- Country: India
- Language: Telugu
- Box office: ₹11 crore distributors' share

Gamyam (transl. Destination) is a 2008 Indian Telugu-language road film written and directed by Krish in his directorial debut. The film stars Allari Naresh, Sharwanand, and Kamalinee Mukherjee.

Loosely inspired by The Motorcycle Diaries (2004), the plot follows the quest of Abhiram (Sharwanand), a rich and arrogant man to seek his love, Janaki (Mukherjee). He is joined by Gaali Seenu (Naresh), a road-side thief in a journey that ultimately results in his self-discovery.

The film received widespread critical acclaim and was a commercial success. It won four Nandi Awards, including Best Feature Film and Best Director, and four Filmfare Awards South, including Best Film and Best Director. In 2009, it was remade in Tamil as Kadhalna Summa Illai (transl. Love is not a joke), with Ravi Krishna replacing Naresh, (Note: Scenes involving Sharwanand and Mukherjee were reused from this film while scenes involving Sharwanand and Ravi Krishna were reshot.) in Kannada as Savaari (2009).

== Plot ==
Janaki is an orphan who crosses many hardships in her life. She manages to finish her MBBS degree and become a doctor. She understands everyday hardships of the common man and wants to serve people as much as she can, so she works in a hospital and spends much of her earnings and time to charity. On the other hand, Abhiram was the only son and heir of the multimillionaire GK. He grows up amongst all the luxuries and finishes his education in London. He comes back to Hyderabad and spends much of his time in parties and with women. He sees Janaki and gets attracted to her. Abhi accepts a challenge with his friends that he would woo Janaki and get her to bed. He starts to grow a relation with Janaki and becomes attracted to her, but her lifestyle is unlike his. On Abhi's birthday party, Janaki learns of his bet and confronts him. He accepts that he was involved in a bet, but he truly loves her and wants to spend his life with her. She angrily leaves the party, and Abhi comes to drop her at her hostel. Their quarrel continues, and they meet with an accident where a woman dies and her son is orphaned. Janaki survives the accident, but Abhi meets with injuries. When he wakes up at the hospital, he is told that Janaki left for her orphanage. Abhi wants to meet her and ask for her apology. In the process, he meets a goodhearted motorbike thief named Gaali Seenu who accompanies him in his journey. The journey Abhi takes changes his life drastically: he is exposed to the hard realities of rural life and its simple joys. The landscapes and the people he meets take him through an emotional journey that alters his perceptions forever and aid in his journey to self-discovery. Abhi and Seenu are captured by naxalites, but manage to escape. However Seenu gets shot in the back in the crossfire while trying to save Abhi and escaping and dies from his injuries. Abhi cries but continues to find Janaki. He finds her in a railway station and tells her about Seenu's death and his journey. Feeling sad for Seenu's sacrifice and Abhi's depression, Janaki and Abhi reconcile.

== Cast ==
- Allari Naresh as Gaali Seenu
- Sharwanand as Abhiram / Abhi
- Kamalinee Mukherjee as Janaki
- Brahmanandam as Pessimist
- Rao Ramesh as Naxalite Sheshu
- Vijayachander as Bala
- Hema as Saraswathi
- Giri Babu as Poorna
- Abhishek as Abhi's friend
- M. S. Narayana
- L. B. Sriram
- Krish as a naxalite (guest appearance)

== Production ==
=== Development ===
Director Krish completed his graduate studies in the United States and returned to India with the sole intention of becoming a filmmaker. Because his parents were not supportive, he started an education consulting firm. Meanwhile, he worked as an assistant to cinematographer-turned-director, Rasool Ellore, who directed Okariki Okaru (2003) and Bhageeratha (2005). After a year and a half of success, Krish returned to his dream of becoming a filmmaker. When travelling across the state of Maharashtra for research on a film topic, he connected with his vehicle driver. From here, he obtained the initial inspiration and wrote a story about two people with a different outlook towards life, travelling together.

Initially, he wanted to make this story in Hindi. With Aaj Jeeyenge as the title, one of his ideas was to picturise the story starting in Delhi, travelling through Bihar, and ending the film's climax in Chhattisgarh. On an occasion, he met Nagaraju Gandham, a Nandi Award-winning theatre writer. With Gandham, he prepared the script. When the daughter of a popular producer of Telugu films approached him for scripts for a small-budget film, he narrated the story which was now based in Andhra Pradesh. To further tighten the loose-ends in his script, he consulted with his family, friends, and well-wishers in the film industry such as K. Raghavendra Rao, Gangaraju Gunnam, and Sirivennela Sitaramasastri. After undergoing several modifications and changes, the eighth version of the script was decided to be the final one. Without commitment from any producer, he decided to produce the film. Eventually, his father, Saibabu Jagarlamudi, produced the film with his brother-in-law, Bibo Srinivas, and friend, Rajeev Reddy, investing.

=== Themes and influences ===
The primary theme of the film is self-discovery. Noting that the film is inspired from The Motorcycle Diaries (2004), Sify wrote about the storyline: "A spoiled rich brat realizing the social responsibility by taking an unusual journey." Rediff.com's Aditya Vardhan also noted its similarities with The Motorcycle Diaries. He added, "Krish weaves his own story around the basic theme and takes us on a journey capturing the mood of the countryside."

== Soundtrack ==
=== Telugu version ===
The original Telugu soundtrack for Gamyam was composed by E. S. Murthy and Anil R. It was released by Vel Records on 17 December 2007.

Gamyam

Soundtrack album by E. S. Murthy, Anil R.
- Released: 17 December 2007
- Recorded: 2007
- Genre: Film soundtrack
- Length: 30:37
- Label: Vel Records
- Producers: E. S. Murthy, Anil R.

Track list
| No. | Title | Lyrics | Singer(s) | Length |
|---|---|---|---|---|
| 1. | "One Way" | E.S. Murthy | Ranjith, Noel Sean | 4:46 |
| 2. | "Chaalle Gaani" | Sirivennela Seetharama Sastry | Chaitanya, Sunitha Upadrashta | 4:28 |
| 3. | "Hatteri Chintamani" | Sirivennela Seetharama Sastry | Deepu, Gayatri | 5:15 |
| 4. | "Samayama" | Sirivennela Seetharama Sastry | Sujatha Mohan | 5:06 |
| 5. | "Entha Varaku" | Sirivennela Seetharama Sastry | Ranjith | 5:03 |
| 6. | "Interludes" | | Instrumental | 5:59 |
| Total length: | | | | 30:37 |

=== Tamil version ===
The soundtrack for the Tamil version, Kadhalna Summa Illai, features music retained from the original film along with an additional track composed by Mani Sharma. It was released by Times Music / Junglee Music in 2008.

Kadhalna Summa Illai

Soundtrack album by E. S. Murthy, Anil R., Mani Sharma
- Released: 2008
- Recorded: 2007–2008
- Genre: Film soundtrack
- Length: 26:35
- Label: Times Music / Junglee Music
- Producers: E. S. Murthy, Anil R.

Track list
| No. | Title | Lyrics | Singer(s) | Length |
|---|---|---|---|---|
| 1. | "Jai Shambo" | Na. Muthukumar | Tippu | 4:09 |
| 2. | "Enamo Saithai Ne" | Na. Muthukumar | Udit Narayan, Sujatha Mohan | 5:33 |
| 3. | "One Way" | Na. Muthukumar | Ranjith, Noel Sean | 4:15 |
| 4. | "Samayamea" | Na. Muthukumar | Sujatha Mohan | 4:34 |
| 5. | "Love Emotion" | | E. S. Murthy | 0:45 |
| 6. | "Juram" | Na. Muthukumar | Ranjith, Anuradha Sriram | 4:16 |
| 7. | "Sound of Love" | | Instrumental | 3:02 |
| Total length: | | | | 26:35 |

== Reception ==
Rediff.com critic G P Aditya Vardhan gave 3 1/2 stars out of 5 and stated: "Krish [..] has a serious theme and blended it with the right mixture of comedy and very good performances." While praising Allari Naresh's performance, Vardhan compared his role to Jagapathi Babu's role in Anthahpuram (1998). "Allari Naresh has finally found his groove," he added. Idlebrain.com rated 3.25/5 also opined the same by writing, "There are similarities between Gaali Seenu character in Gamyam and Jagapati Babu's role in Anthahpuram."

Sify which rated 3/5, wrote: "Gamyam is a good cinema with a touch of artistic values. The film's strengths are writing and direction. New director Radhakrishna shows that offbeat movies can be made entertainingly. He deserves praise for his honest effort and superb writing."

== Awards ==
Filmfare Awards South

- Best Film - Saibabu Jagarlamudi
- Best Director - Krish
- Best Supporting Actor - Allari Naresh
- Best Lyrics- Sirivennela Sitaramasastri for "Enthavaraku"

Nandi Awards

- Best Film - Golden Nandi - Saibabu Jagarlamudi
- Best Director - Krish
- Best Supporting Actor - Allari Naresh
- Best Lyrics - Sirivennela Sitaramasastri for "Enthavaraku"
