= Malli Malli Idi Rani Roju =

- Theatrical release poster
- Directed by: Kranthi Madhav
- Written by: Kranthi Madhav; Sai Madhav Burra (dialogues)
- Produced by: K. A. Vallabha
- Starring: Sharwanand; Nithya Menen
- Cinematography: Gnana Shekar V.S.
- Edited by: Kotagiri Venkateswara Rao
- Music by: Gopi Sundar
- Production company: Creative Commercials
- Release date: 6 February 2015
- Running time: 144 minutes
- Country: India
- Language: Telugu

Malli Malli Idi Rani Roju (transl. This is a day that will not come again) is a 2015 Indian Telugu-language romantic drama film written and directed by Kranthi Madhav, starring Sharwanand and Nithya Menen. The music was composed by Gopi Sundar with cinematography by Gnana Shekar V.S. and editing by Kotagiri Venkateswara Rao. The film's title is based on a song from Rakshasudu (1986).

The film released on 6 February 2015 to generally positive reviews from both the critics and audience, alike. It quickly went on to become one of the most-loved romantic dramas of Telugu cinema and brought a lot of goodwill to Sharwanand and Nithya Menen as capable thespians.

Nithya Menen won Filmfare Critics Award for Best Actress - South for her performance. The film garnered the state Nandi Awards for Best Home Viewing Feature Film, Special Jury Awards for Nithya Menen and Sharwanand, Best Female Playback Singer, and Best Dialogue Writer.

== Plot ==
This movie is a simple, romantic, heart touching love story. The movie starts with Raja Ram's introduction as a successful track-runner. He has a daughter named Parvathi who works in FM Radio. Ram then begins narrating his past.

The movie shifts to Ram's youth, where his aim was to become a successful track-runner. His mother Parvathi, the namesake of his daughter, is a music teacher who earns money for Ram's education. She dreams of him winning a gold medal in national level track-running. Ram continues his studies and wins the State athletics championship after a few days, where he meets Nazeera, who starts caring about him. She always wore a burqa covering her face with niqab, so Ram never saw her face. Nazeera has a friend, Jyothi , who is always with her. Nazeera joins Parvathi's music class and introduces herself as Khanum. Ram is honored for winning in state athletics championship, where a guy asks him for his autograph and reveals that it is Nazeera who asked for it. He follows Nazeera and she falls in love with him. Nazeera tells Jyothi about her love with Ram. Nazeera goes to Ram's house and knows that he requires shoes which he could not afford. She gives him the money for that and takes his medals in return.

Ram starts for National Athletics in Delhi on train. Ram sees Nazeera when her veil suddenly opens, and her identity is revealed as Nazeera-Khanum. Ram wins the national medal. His mother with Nazeera starts preparing badam kheer for Ram. Nazeera starts speaking indirectly about Ram when Parvathi calls her Nazeera (not Khanum), for which she gets shocked. Parvathi tells that it was only Khanum who knows about the shoes and how Nazeera can give the money unless both are same, and thus Nazeera's identity is revealed again. Ram comes to home and sees Nazeera. When they get close, she gets a call from home. Ram waits for Nazeera when he receives a news that Parvathi is dead. He reaches there and does all the rituals. Nazeera tries to call Ram but is obstructed. She goes to Malaysia. Then Ram tells that he never knew Nazeera and only has a letter which he got from her after that.

The movie then turns to Nazeera's present life in Malaysia where she looks after her father's company. She has a daughter who has many useless love stories and disturbs Nazeera by remembering Ram. Nazeera narrates her past. The call which she received from home changed her life. She goes to Malaysia as she was informed about her father's injury. For her surprise, she finds him healthy. Her father asks her about Ram. Nazeera says that she is never going to leave Ram. Unable to stop their love, he shoots himself. Nazeera, who was in depression, respects her father's death by sacrificing her love. She informs Ram by a letter that she is married. She stays in Malaysia singly where she finds an abandoned child and brings her up as Mehak. After listening to this, Mehak challenges Nazeera that Ram has already forgotten Nazeera. However, Nazeera always finds Ram to be a winner and says that he never forgets her. Mehak and Nazeera leave to India.

They go to Ram's house to meet him. They get to know that Ram is at a marriage and go there and find him, where he loses his handkerchief. Nazeera takes that and remembers that it was given by her in the past. Mehak gives that to Ram and inquires the story behind it. Ram narrates and that shows Nazeera in his heart. Nazeera feels bad of the challenge and feels that is an insult for her love and starts to leave to Malaysia. In the way, she meets Ram's daughter Parvathi in the radio mirchi and speaks to her. Parvathi shows a photo of her mother, who was Jyothi. Nazeera leaves abruptly. While going, Nazeera gives Parvathi a gift for Ram and then they leave for the airport. Ram comes there and sees the gift box and realizes that Nazeera has come for him and rushes to the airport. Nazeera meets Jyothi in the airport, who tells that they are in a relationship and after she had a child, he left her. Nazeera says that Ram is not such a guy. Then Jyothi says that she was speaking of some other guy called Seenu. She tells her that Ram has brought up Parvathi but is not her father. She also tells that Ram is not married and has only Nazeera in his heart and he still loves her. Ram comes to the airport and knows from Mehak that Nazeera was not married and rushes into the airport despite the obstructing police there. He sees Nazeera standing there for him. Both of them hug each other and the movie has a happy ending.

== Cast ==
- Sharvanand as Raja Ram, Parvathi's son and Nazeera's love interest; Parvathi's adoptive father
- Nithya Menon as Nazeera Khanum, Ram's love interest and Jyothi's best friend; Mehak's adoptive mother
- Pavitra Lokesh as Parvathi, Ram's mother
- Nassar as Nazeera's father
- Shanoor Sana as Nazeera's mother
- Tejaswi Madivada as Mehak, Nazeera's adoptive daughter
- Punarnavi Bhupalam as Parvathi, Jyothi's biological daughter and Ram's adoptive daughter
- Pavani Gangireddy as Jyothi, Nazeera's best friend and Parvathi's biological mother
- Surya as Raja Ram's coach
- Chinna as Ismail Bhai
- Naveen Neni as Ram's best friend

== Soundtrack ==
The soundtrack was composed by Malayalam composer Gopi Sundar, making his debut in Telugu cinema. The album features five tracks. The Soundtrack was Released on 7 December 2014.

No.	Title	Lyrics	Singer(s)	Length
1.	"Yenno Yenno"	Sahiti	Karthik, Chinmayi
2.	"Marhaba"	Sahiti	K. S. Chitra, Aishwarya
3.	"Choti Zindagi"	Ramajogayya Sastry	Hiranmayi
4.	"Gathama Gathama"	Ramajogayya Sastry	Priya Hemesh
5.	"Varinche Prema"	Sahiti	Haricharan

== Awards and nominations ==
Awards	Category	Nominee	Result
63rd Filmfare Awards South	Best Film — Telugu	K. A. Vallabha	Nominated
63rd Filmfare Awards South	Best Director — Telugu	Kranthi Madhav	Nominated
63rd Filmfare Awards South	Best Actress — Telugu	Nithya Menen	Nominated
63rd Filmfare Awards South	Critics Best Actress – Telugu	Nithya Menen	Won
63rd Filmfare Awards South	Best Music Director — Telugu	Gopi Sundar	Nominated
63rd Filmfare Awards South	Best Supporting Actress — Telugu	Pavitra Lokesh	Nominated
63rd Filmfare Awards South	Best Female Playback Singer — Telugu	K. S. Chitra and Aishwarya (for song "Marhabha")	Nominated
2015 Nandi Awards	Best Home-viewing Feature Film (Gold)	Kranthi Madhav	Won
2015 Nandi Awards	Best Female Playback Singer	Chinmayi	Won
2015 Nandi Awards	Best Dialogue Writer	Burra Sai Madhav	Won
2015 Nandi Awards	Special Jury Award	Nithya Menen, Sharwanand, Gnana Shekar V. S.	Won

== Critical reception ==
The Times of India gave the film 3 stars out of 5 and wrote, "That a filmmaker can evoke at least a bit of awe while dealing with romance, amidst scores of sex-crazed rom-coms, is no mean feat. Between its simplistic approach to romance and lack of a strong conflict, there's a layer of magic in Malli Malli Idhi Rani Roju. That's more than enough to make you crave for more, especially for Nithya and Sharwanand's crackling chemistry". The Hindu wrote, "If you love old-world romances, Malli Malli… is up your alley. On the flipside, the film’s snail pace gets grating at times and the contrived ending...takes some sheen off the otherwise beautiful film".

123telugu.com gave 3.25 out of 5 and wrote, "Malli Malli Idi Rani Roju is a feel good love story which stays within your heart. However, the slow paced narration and lack of entertainment will not go well with certain sections of the audience". idlebrain.com gave 3 out of 5 and wrote, "Malli Malli Idi Rani Roju is a good attempt, but not engaging enough". iqlikmovies.com user ratings garnered 3 out 5.
