= Krishnam Vande Jagadgurum =

2012 Telugu-language action drama film

- Theatrical release poster
- Directed by: Krish Jagarlamudi
- Screenplay by: Krish Jagarlamudi
- Dialogues by: Sai Madhav Burra
- Story by: Krish Jagarlamudi
- Produced by: Saibabu Jagarlamudi; Yeduguru Rajeev Reddy
- Starring: Rana Daggubati; Nayanthara
- Cinematography: Gnana Shekar V. S.
- Edited by: Shravan Katikaneni
- Music by: Mani Sharma
- Production company: First Frame Entertainment
- Distributed by: Reliance Entertainment; 7 Seas Inc (overseas)
- Release date: 30 November 2012 (India)
- Running time: 139 minutes
- Country: India
- Language: Telugu
- Box office: est.₹45 crore

Krishnam Vande Jagadgurum (transl. Praise Krishna, the Guru of the Universe) is a 2012 Indian Telugu-language action drama film directed by Krish and jointly produced by Saibabu Jagarlamudi and Rajeev Reddy on First Frame Entertainment. It has received universal acclaim for combining the art form of Surabhi and an action flick based on illegal mining in Bellary. It stars Rana Daggubati and Nayanthara, while Kota Srinivasa Rao, Milind Gunaji, Murali Sharma, Brahmanandam, Posani Krishna Murali, and L. B. Sriram appear in supporting roles. Mani Sharma composed the music for the film.

It was released on 30 November 2012 to high critical acclaim and was declared a blockbuster at the box office.

== Plot ==
Babu is a young stage artist who performs with Surabhi, a theatrical troupe led by his passionate grandfather, Subrahmanyam. Though very gifted in his craft, Babu resents the art due to his poor earnings from it and makes plans to leave for a better lifestyle in USA. Disappointed with his grandson’s intentions, Subrahmanyam dies of grief in his sleep, devastating everyone. Babu and the troupe travel to Ballari to fulfill Subrahmanyam's wish of having his ashes dispersed in the Tungabhadra River.

Shortly after their arrival, one of the troupe’s artists engages in an altercation with Saida, a local goon, who retaliates by severing the former’s tongue and urinating in Subrahmanyam’s ashes. An infuriated Babu sets off in pursuit of Saida, and runs into Devika, a journalist and a CBI informer documenting the illegal mining operations of Reddappa, Saida’s boss and a cruel industrialist. On their way, Jogamma, an elderly woman desperately searching for Babu, finds him and reveals his tragic origins – Babu was born to Jogamma’s friends, Ramamurthy Naidu, a forest ranger, and his wife. In his infancy, Babu’s parents were murdered by his uncle, Chakravarthy, who was evading arrest for another murder. After witnessing his parents’ death, Jogamma escaped with an infant Babu and placed him in the care of Subrahmanyam, who adopted Babu as his grandson. Upon learning this, Babu realizes Subrahmanyam's love for him and swears revenge on Chakravarthy.

Continuing on their chase after Reddappa and Saida, Devika and Babu get caught in the crossfire of an attack on Reddappa by none other than Chakravarthy and his men. While Reddappa survives, Devika and Babu get injured in the attack and escape to a nearby forest, where they seek refuge with an inhabiting tribe. After tending to their injuries, the tribal people share that they migrated there after Reddappa mercilessly forced them out of their native forest and burned it to excavate the land. Devika firmly determines to seek justice for Reddappa’s crimes, while Babu insists on not interfering, leading to an altercation that separates them. Devika eventually stumbles into Chakravarthy, who reveals to her that he is the real Reddappa, and that the true Chakravarthy stole his identity after killing Babu’s parents and committing other crimes. Later, however, Chakravarthy captures Reddappa and renders him mute in response to the earlier attack.

Babu emotionally returns to Surabhi and decides to perform Subrahmanyam's last authored play, Krishnam Vande Jagadgurum, with the troupe. When Chakravarthy arrives with Saida to watch the performance, Babu immediately kills the latter, and discloses his knowledge of his parents’ demise and intention to kill their slayer to Chakravarthy, unaware of his true identity. Chakravarthy deceptively offers the real Reddappa in his place to Babu, but Jogamma and Devika arrive just in time to reveal the truth. A furious Babu assaults and subdues Chakravarthy after overpowering his men, and delivers him to the tribe he displaced, who burn Chakravarthy alive to avenge their loss. Babu concludes his duty and honors Subrahmanyam by dispersing his ashes in the Tungabhadra River.

== Cast ==
- Rana Daggubati as Babu
- Nayanthara as Devika
- Milind Gunaji as Redappa (Fake)/Chakravarthy
- Murali Sharma as Chakravarthy (Fake)/Reddappa
- Kota Srinivasa Rao as Subrahmanyam
- L. B. Sriram as Matti Raju
- Annapoorna as Jogamma
- Adithya as Ramamurthy Naidu, Babu's father
- Lakshmi Vasudevan as Babu's mother
- Prabhakar as Saida
- Ravi Prakash as Pattabhi
- Raghu Babu as Veeraraju
- Satyam Rajesh as Swamy
- Hema as Rathna Prabha
- Brahmanandam as Rangasthala Pandit a.k.a. "Rampam"
- Posani Krishna Murali as Tippu Sultan
- Kishore
- Roopa Devi
- Ventakesh Daggubati as "Ballari" Babu (special appearance) in song "Sye Andre Nanu"
- Sameera Reddy as item number in song "Sye Andre Nanu"
- Hazel Keech as item number in song "Chal Chal Chal"

== Production ==
Rana was cast for the lead role of Babu, a young drama artist. Nayanthara was cast to play the crucial role of a documentary filmmaker. She dubbed for the role herself. Sameera Reddy was hired for an item number with Venkatesh making a cameo appearance in this movie.

== Soundtrack ==
Krishnam Vande Jagadgurum

Soundtrack album by Mani Sharma
- Released: 7 October 2012
- Recorded: 2012
- Genre: Film soundtrack
- Length: 37:44
- Language: Telugu
- Label: Saregama
- Producer: Mani Sharma

Mani Sharma chronology
Cameraman Gangatho Rambabu (2012)	Krishnam Vande Jagadgurum (2012)	Vetri Selvan (2012)

The audio launch of Krishnam Vande Jagadgurum was held on 7 October 2012 in Hyderabad. Rather differently, the film's director Krish and hero Rana Daggubati played the hosts apart from Gayathri Bhargavi. Nayantara, who seldom attends audio events, attended the function. Others who graced the event include Venkatesh, S. S. Rajamouli, Dil Raju, D. Ramanaidu, Sirivennela Sitaramasastri, Mani Sharma, and Kota Srinivasa Rao. Venkatesh gave the first CD to S. S. Rajamouli.

Track listing
No.	Title	Lyrics	Artist(s)	Length
1.	"Ararey Pasi Manasaa"	Sirivennela Sitaramasastri	Narendra, Sravana Bhargavi	5:28
2.	"Sai Andri Nanu"	E.S. Murthy	Shreya Ghoshal, Rahul Sipligunj, Deepu	4:59
3.	"Krishnam Vande Jagadgurum"	Sirivennela Sitaramasastri	S. P. Balasubrahmanyam	9:25
4.	"Spicy Spicy Girl"	Sirivennela Sitaramasastri	Hemachandra, Chaitra, Sravana Bhargavi	4:18
5.	"Ranga Marthanda"	Sai Madhav Burra	Raghu Babu, Hemachandra, Sai Madhav Burra	3:19
6.	"Chal Chal Chal"	Sai Madhav Burra	Joanna	3:35
7.	"Parinamam" (Instrumental)		Evolution Theme	6:40
Total length:				37:44

== Release ==
The Central Board of Film Certification rated it U/A with 14 cuts and violence in all fights has been reduced by at least 50%. Krishnam Vande Jagadgurum was expected to open in 1,000 screens worldwide and is likely to outnumber Aamir Khan's Talaash in terms of screens in south India. The film was to be released across an equal number of screens in Andhra Pradesh, Karnataka, Kerala and Tamil Nadu.

The film was simultaneously released as Ongaram in Tamil and as Action Khiladi in Malayalam. It was also dubbed and released in Hindi as Krishna Ka Badla in 2014.

== Reception ==
idlebrain.com jeevi gave a rating of 3/5 stating "Krishnam Vande Jagadgurum is film that mixes the sensibilities of Krish with commercial elements." Riya Chakravarthy of NDTV gave a review stating: "Krishnam Vande Jagadgurum is a mix of a commendable acting and a good script. Like with his previous movies, Krish has once again proved his directorial credentials with this film. Overall, a good watch that will appeal to all types of audience." Rediff gave a review stating "All in all, Krishnam Vande Jagadgurum is a film to be seen for its fine story and well-defined characteristation. It is both thought-provoking and entertaining and the music, camera work, acting and technical elements are all good. Go watch KVJ." Oneindia.in gave a rating 3.5/5 stating "Overall, Krishnam Vande Jagadgurum is both a good entertainer and a thought provoking movie. Rana will definitely rock you. Don't miss it this weekend." Mirchi9.com gave a review stating "Krishnam Vande Jagadgurum is a thought provoking intense entertainer which carries an inherent message in it. Leaving aside the commercial dynamics of the movie, the movie is a must watch." Tikkview.com gives 3.9/5 for this film saying that it is a mass movie.

== Awards ==
Ceremony	Category	Nominee	Result
TSR - TV9 National Film Awards 2012	Best Character Actor	Kota Srinivasa Rao	Won
60th Filmfare Awards South	Best Director	Radhakrishna Jagarlamudi	Nominated
60th Filmfare Awards South	Best Actress	Nayantara	Nominated
60th Filmfare Awards South	Best Supporting Actor	Posani Krishna Murali	Nominated
60th Filmfare Awards South	Best Music Director	Manisharma	Nominated
60th Filmfare Awards South	Best Lyricist	Sirivennela Sitaramasastri for "Krishnam Vande Jagadgurum"	Nominated
60th Filmfare Awards South	Best Playback Singer - Male	S. P. Balasubrahmanyam for "Krishnam Vande Jagadgurum"	Nominated
60th Filmfare Awards South	Best Playback Singer - Female	Shreya Ghoshal for "Saayandhralo"	Nominated
2nd South Indian International Movie Awards	Best Actor in a Supporting Role	Kota Srinivasa Rao	Nominated
2nd South Indian International Movie Awards	Best Comedian	Posani Krishna Murali	Nominated
2nd South Indian International Movie Awards	Best Lyricist	Sirivennela Sitaramasastri for "Jaruguthunnaadi"	Nominated
2nd South Indian International Movie Awards	Best Male Playback Singer	S. P. Balasubrahmanyam	Nominated
2nd South Indian International Movie Awards	Best Female Playback Singer	Shreya Ghoshal	Nominated
2nd South Indian International Movie Awards	Best Actor (Critics)	Rana Daggubati	Won
2nd South Indian International Movie Awards	Best Actress (Critics)	Nayantara	Won

== Box office ==
The film collected around ₹45 crore worldwide.
