= Filmfare Award for Best Director – Telugu =

Telugu language film award

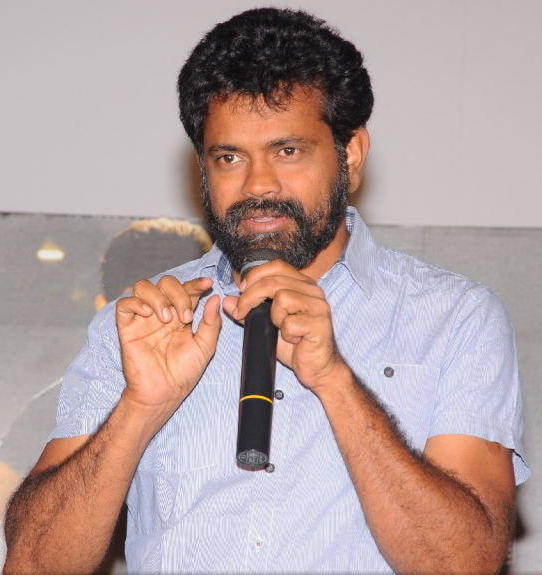
- The 2024 recipient: Sukumar
- Awarded for: Excellence in Cinematic Direction Achievement in Telugu films
- Country: India
- Presented by: Filmfare
- First award: K. V. Reddy for Sri Krishna Satya (1972)
- Currently held by: Sukumar for Pushpa 2: The Rule (2024)

Highlights
- Most wins: K. Viswanath (8)
- Most nominations: S. S. Rajamouli (10)

The Filmfare Award for Best Director – Telugu is presented by the Filmfare magazine as part of its annual Filmfare Awards South for Telugu films. The awards were extended to "Best Director" in 1972.

== Superlatives ==
Superlative	Director	Record
Most wins	K. Viswanath	8
Most nominations	S. S. Rajamouli	10

- K. Viswanath has the record of winning the award eight times and winning it twice in a row, on three separate occasions (1974–1975, 1982–1983 and 1986–1987).
- S. S. Rajamouli has received the award five times, which is the second most. He is the only director to have won the award in three separate decades: the 2000s, 2010s, and 2020s. He also holds the record for receiving 10 nominations, the highest among all.
- Nandini Reddy and Sripriya are the only female directors to have been nominated, for their films Ala Modalaindi (2011) and Drushyam (2014) respectively.
- Krish remains the only director to have won the award for his first two films, Gamyam and Vedam, consecutively.
- Sukumar, Venu Yeldandi and Krish are the only directors who received the award for their debut films.

== Winners ==
Year	Director	Film	Ref
2024	Sukumar	Pushpa 2: The Rule	
2023	Venu Yeldandi	Balagam	
2022	S. S. Rajamouli	RRR	
2020–2021	Sukumar	Pushpa: The Rise	
2019	AWARDS FUNCTION WAS SUSPENDED DUE TO COVID-19 PANDEMIC		
2018	Nag Ashwin	Mahanati	
2017	S. S. Rajamouli	Baahubali: The Conclusion	
2016	Vamsi Paidipally	Oopiri	
2015	S. S. Rajamouli	Baahubali: The Beginning	
2014	Vikram Kumar	Manam	
2013	Trivikram Srinivas	Atharintiki Daaredi	
2012	S. S. Rajamouli	Eega	
2011	Sreenu Vaitla	Dookudu	
2010	Krish	Vedam	
2009	S. S. Rajamouli	Magadheera	
2008	Krish	Gamyam	
2007	Sekhar Kammula	Happy Days	
2006	Puri Jagannadh	Pokiri	
2005	Trivikram Srinivas	Athadu	
2004	Sukumar	Arya	
2003	Gunasekhar	Okkadu	
2002	Krishna Vamsi	Khadgam	
2001	Teja	Nuvvu Nenu	
2000	K. Vijaya Bhaskar	Nuvve Kavali	
1999	B. Gopal	Samarasimha Reddy	
1998	Krishna Vamsi	Anthahpuram	
1997	K. Raghavendra Rao	Annamayya	
1996	Krishna Vamsi	Ninne Pelladata	
1995	K. Viswanath	Subha Sankalpam	
1994	S. V. Krishna Reddy	Subhalagnam	
1993	K. Raghavendra Rao	Allari Priyudu	
1992	K. Viswanath	Aapadbandhavudu	
1991	Kranthi Kumar	Seetharamayya Gari Manavaralu	
1990	K. Raghavendra Rao	Jagadeka Veerudu Athiloka Sundari	
1989	Mani Ratnam	Geethanjali	
1988	M. V. Raghu	Kallu	
1987	K. Viswanath	Sruthilayalu	
1986	K. Viswanath	Swathi Muthyam	
1985	Singeetham Srinivasa Rao	Mayuri	
1984	Jandhyala	Srivariki Premalekha	
1983	K. Viswanath	Saagara Sangamam	
1982	K. Viswanath	Subhalekha	
1981	Dasari Narayana Rao	Premabhishekam	
1980	Bapu	Vamsa Vruksham	
1979	Dasari Narayana Rao	Gorintaku	
1978	K. Balachander	Maro Charitra	
1977	K. Raghavendra Rao	Prema Lekhalu	
1976	Bapu	Seetha Kalyanam	
1975	K. Viswanath	Jeevana Jyothi	
1974	K. Viswanath	O Seeta Katha	
1973	T. Rama Rao	Jeevana Tharangaalu	
1972	K. V. Reddy	Sri Krishna Satya	

== Nominations ==
Before 2000 year there have been no nominations for Filmfare Awards South in Telugu films, The panel of judges jury members are selected for winners in different Categories.

=== 2000s ===
- 2001: Teja – Nuvvu Nenu
  - B. Gopal – Narasimha Naidu
  - Krishna Vamsi – Murari
- 2002: Krishna Vamsi – Khadgam
  - Puri Jagannadh – Idiot
  - Teja – Jayam
  - V. V. Vinayak – Aadi
- 2003: Gunasekhar – Okkadu
  - Rasool Ellore – Okariki Okaru
  - S. S. Rajamouli – Simhadri
  - Puri Jagannadh – Amma Nanna O Tamila Ammayi
- 2004: Sukumar – Arya
  - K. Vijaya Bhaskar – Malliswari
  - S. S. Rajamouli – Sye
  - Sekhar Kammula – Anand
- 2005: Trivikram Srinivas – Athadu
  - Muppalaneni Shiva – Sankranti
  - Prabhu Deva – Nuvvostanante Nenoddantana
  - Puri Jagannadh – Super
  - S. S. Rajamouli – Chhatrapati
- 2006: Puri Jagannadh – Pokiri
  - Bhaskar – Bommarillu
  - S. S. Rajamouli – Vikramarkudu
  - Shekhar Kammula – Godavari
- 2007: Sekhar Kammula – Happy Days
  - Puri Jagannadh – Desamuduru
  - S. S. Rajamouli – Yamadonga
  - Sreenu Vaitla – Dhee
  - Tulasiram – Mantra
- 2008: Krish – Gamyam
  - Bhaskar – Parugu
  - Ravi Babu – Nachavule
  - Sreenu Vaitla – Ready
  - Trivikram Srinivas – Jalsa
- 2009: S. S. Rajamouli – Magadheera
  - Chaitanya Dantaluri – Baanam
  - Kodi Ramakrishna – Arundhati
  - Sukumar – Arya 2
  - Surender Reddy – Kick

=== 2010s ===
- 2010: Krish – Vedam
  - Boyapati Srinu – Simha
  - Gautham Vasudev Menon – Ye Maaya Chesave
  - Sekhar Kammula – Leader
  - Vamsi Paidipally – Brindavanam
- 2011: Sreenu Vaitla – Dookudu
  - Bapu – Sri Rama Rajyam
  - Dasaradh – Mr. Perfect
  - Nandini Reddy – Ala Modalaindi
  - Sukumar – 100% Love
- 2012: S. S. Rajamouli – Eega
  - Harish Shankar – Gabbar Singh
  - Krish – Krishnam Vande Jagadgurum
  - Puri Jagannadh – Business Man
  - Trivikram Srinivas – Julayi
- 2013: Trivikram Srinivas – Atharintiki Daaredi
  - Koratala Siva – Mirchi
  - Srikanth Addala – Seethamma Vakitlo Sirimalle Chettu
  - Vijaykumar Konda – Gunde Jaari Gallanthayyinde
  - Virinchi Varma – Uyyala Jampala
- 2014: Vikram Kumar – Manam
  - Chandoo Mondeti – Karthikeya
  - Sripriya – Drushyam
  - Sujeeth – Run Raja Run
  - Surender Reddy – Race Gurram
- 2015: S. S. Rajamouli – Baahubali: The Beginning
  - Koratala Siva – Srimanthudu
  - Kranthi Madhav – Malli Malli Idi Rani Roju
  - Krish – Kanche
  - Trivikram Srinivas – S/O Satyamurthy
- 2016: Vamsi Paidipally – Oopiri
  - Koratala Siva – Janatha Garage
  - Ravikanth Perepu – Kshanam
  - Sukumar – Nannaku Prematho
  - Tharun Bhascker Dhaassyam – Pelli Choopulu
  - Trivikram Srinivas – A Aa
- 2017: S. S. Rajamouli – Baahubali 2: The Conclusion
  - Krish – Gauthamiputra Satakarni
  - Sandeep Reddy Vanga – Arjun Reddy
  - Sankalp Reddy – Ghazi
  - Satish Vegesna – Sathamanam Bhavati
  - Sekhar Kammula – Fidaa
- 2018: Nag Ashwin – Mahanati
  - Indraganti Mohan Krishna – Sammohanam
  - Koratala Siva – Bharat Ane Nenu
  - Parasuram – Geetha Govindam
  - Sukumar – Rangasthalam
  - Venkatesh Maha – C/o Kancharapalem

=== 2020s ===
- 2020–2021: Sukumar – Pushpa: The Rise
  - Buchi Babu Sana – Uppena
  - Karuna Kumar – Palasa 1978
  - Rahul Sankrityan – Shyam Singha Roy
  - Sekhar Kammula – Love Story
  - Trivikram Srinivas – Ala Vaikunthapurramuloo
  - Uday Gurrala – Mail
- 2022: S. S. Rajamouli – RRR
  - Chandoo Mondeti – Karthikeya 2
  - Hanu Raghavapudi – Sita Ramam
  - Sai Kiran – Masooda
  - Sashi Kiran Tikka – Major
  - Vimal Krishna – DJ Tillu
- 2023: Venu Yeldandi – Balagam
  - Anil Ravipudi – Bhagavanth Kesari
  - Karthik Varma Dandu – Virupaksha
  - Prashanth Neel – Salaar: Part 1 – Ceasefire
  - Sai Rajesh Neelam – Baby
  - Shouryuv – Hi Nanna
  - Srikanth Odela – Dasara
- 2024: Sukumar – Pushpa 2: The Rule
  - Nag Ashwin – Kalki 2898 AD
  - Nanda Kishore Emani – 35 Chinna Katha Kaadu
  - Prasanth Varma – Hanu-Man
  - Venky Atluri – Lucky Baskhar
  - Yadhu Vamsi – Committee Kurrollu
