= SIIMA Award for Best Actor =

Film awards

South Indian International Movie Awards, also known as the SIIMA Awards, rewards the artistic and technical achievements of the South Indian film industry. SIIMA Awards are presented for numerous categories in each of the four language films (Kannada, Malayalam, Tamil and Telugu). SIIMA award for Best Actor recognizes the performance of an actor in a leading role in South Indian movie. SIIMA award for Best Actor was first given during the year 2012.

== Superlatives ==
Superlative	Best Actor	
First Most awards	Puneeth Rajkumar	7 awards
Second Most awards	Ram Charan; Nivin Pauly; Dhanush	5 awards
Third Most awards	Vijay; Vijay Deverakonda; Vijay Sethupathi; Mahesh Babu	4 awards
Fourth Most awards	Vishal; Mohanlal	3 awards

== Winners & Nominees ==
Language	Year	actor	Film	Ref.
Telugu	2011	Mahesh Babu	Dookudu	
Telugu	2012	Pawan Kalyan	Gabbar Singh	
Telugu	2013	Mahesh Babu	Seethamma Vakitlo Sirimalle Chettu	
Telugu	2014	Nandamuri Balakrishna	Legend	
Telugu	2015	Mahesh Babu	Srimanthudu	
Telugu	2016	N. T. Rama Rao Jr.	Janatha Garage	
Telugu	2017	Prabhas	Baahubali 2: The Conclusion	
Telugu	2018	Ram Charan	Rangasthalam	
Telugu	2019	Mahesh Babu	Maharshi	
Telugu	2020	Allu Arjun	Ala Vaikunthapurramuloo	
Telugu	2021	Allu Arjun	Pushpa The Rise	
Telugu	2022	N. T. Rama Rao Jr.	RRR	
Tamil	2011	Dhanush	Aadukalam	
Tamil	2012	Dhanush	3	
Tamil	2013	Sivakarthikeyan	Ethir Neechal	
Tamil	2014	Dhanush	Velaiilla Pattadhari	
Tamil	2015	Vikram	I	
Tamil	2016	Sivakarthikeyan	Remo	
Tamil	2017	Sivakarthikeyan	Velaikkaran	
Tamil	2018	Dhanush	Vada Chennai	
Tamil	2019	Dhanush	Asuran	
Tamil	2020	Suriya	Soorarai Pottru	
Tamil	2021	Sivakarthikeyan	Doctor	
Tamil	2021	Silambarasan	Maanaadu	
Tamil	2022	Kamal Haasan	Vikram	
Malayalam	2011	Mohanlal	Pranayam	
Malayalam	2012	Mohanlal	Spirit	
Malayalam	2013	Dileep	Sound Thoma	
Malayalam	2014	Nivin Pauly	1983	
Malayalam	2015	Prithviraj Sukumaran	Ennu Ninte Moideen	
Malayalam	2016	Mohanlal	Pulimurugan	
Malayalam	2017	Nivin Pauly	Njandukalude Nattil Oridavela	
Malayalam	2018	Tovino Thomas	Theevandi	
Malayalam	2019	Mohanlal	Lucifer	
Malayalam	2020	Prithviraj Sukumaran	Ayyappanum Koshiyum	
Kannada	2011	Puneeth Rajkumar	Hudugaru	
Kannada	2012	Shiva Rajkumar	Shiva	
Kannada	2013	Shiva Rajkumar	Bhajarangi	
Kannada	2014	Yash	Mr. and Mrs. Ramachari	
Kannada	2015	Puneeth Rajkumar	Rana Vikrama	
Kannada	2016	Shiva Rajkumar	Shivalinga	
Kannada	2017	Puneeth Rajkumar	Raajakumara	
Kannada	2018	Yash	K.G.F: Chapter 1	
Kannada	2019	Darshan	Yajamana	
Kannada	2020	Dhananjaya	Popcorn Monkey Tiger	
Kannada	2021	Puneeth Rajkumar	Yuvarathnaa	
Kannada	2022	Yash	K.G.F: Chapter 2	
Kannada	2023	Rakshith Shetty	Saptha Sagaradaache Ello - Side A	

== Critics choice ==
Language	Year	Actor	Film	Ref.
Telugu	2011	Nandamuri Balakrishna	Sri Rama Rajyam	
Telugu	2012	Rana Daggubati	Krishnam Vande Jagadgurum	
Telugu	2013	Ram Charan	Naayak	
Telugu	2014	Ram Charan	Govindudu Andarivadele	
Telugu	2015	Vijay Deverakonda	Yevade Subramanyam	
Telugu	2016	Nani	Krishna Gadi Veera Prema Gaadha	
Telugu	2017	Venkatesh; Nandamuri Balakrishna	Guru Gautamiputra Satakarni	
Telugu	2018	Vijay Deverakonda	Geetha Govindam	
Telugu	2019	Vijay Deverakonda	Dear Comrade	
Telugu	2020	Vijay Deverakonda	World Famous Lover	
Tamil	2012	Vijay Sethupathi	Pizza	
Tamil	2013	Dhanush	Mariyan	
Tamil	2014	Karthi	Madras	
Tamil	2015	Jayam Ravi	Thani Oruvan	
Tamil	2016	R. Madhavan	Irudhi Suttru	
Tamil	2017	R. Madhavan	Vikram Vedha	
Tamil	2018	Jayam Ravi	Adanga Maru	
Tamil	2019	Karthi	Kaithi	
Malayalam	2011	Salim Kumar	Adaminte Makan Abu	
Malayalam	2012	Fahadh Faasil	Diamond Necklace	
Malayalam	2013	Prithviraj Sukumaran	Mumbai Police	
Malayalam	2014	Nivin Pauly	Bangalore Days	
Malayalam	2015	Nivin Pauly	Premam	
Malayalam	2016	Nivin Pauly	Action Hero Biju	
Malayalam	2017	Fahadh Faasil	Thondimuthalum Driksakshiyum	
Malayalam	2018	Nivin Pauly	Hey Jude	
Kannada	2011	Upendra		
Kannada	2012	Upendra	Katariveera Surasundarangi	
Kannada	2013	Upendra	Topiwala	
Kannada	2014	Upendra	Super Ranga	
Kannada	2015	Sathish Ninasam	Rocket	
Kannada	2016	Rakshith Shetty	Kirik Party	
Kannada	2017	Sri Murali	Mufti	
Kannada	2018	Yash	K.G.F: Chapter 1	
