= 63rd Filmfare Awards South =

Award ceremony for South Indian films

- Date: 18 June 2016
- Hosted by: Chinmayi, Rahul
- Produced by: Britannia
- Official website: Hyderabad, Telangana, India

Highlights
- Best Picture: Pathemari (Malayalam), RangiTaranga (Kannada), Baahubali: The Beginning (Telugu), Kaaka Muttai (Tamil)
- Most awards: Ennu Ninte Moideen (Malayalam), 7
- Most nominations: Ennu Ninte Moideen (Malayalam), 10; Baahubali (Telugu), 8 Srimanthudu (Telugu), 8 O Kadhal Kanmani (Tamil), 7 Rangitharanga (Kannada), 6

The 63rd Filmfare Awards South ceremony honouring the winners and nominees of the best of South Indian cinema in 2015 is an event held on 18 June 2016 at the Hyderabad International Convention Centre, in Hyderabad.

== List of nominees ==
=== Main awards ===
The winners are listed first, highlighted in boldface.

==== Kannada cinema ====
Best Film	Best Director
**H.K.Prakash -RangiTaranga**; Aatagara; Krishna Leela; Mythri; Rana Vikrama	**Anup Bhandari –RangiTaranga**; Duniya Soori – Kendasampige; K. M. Chaitanya – Aatagara; Pavan Wadeyar – Rana Vikrama; Shashank- Krishna Leela
Best Actor	Best Actress
**Puneeth Rajkumar – Rana Vikrama**; Ajay Rao – Krishna Leela; Sanchari Vijay – Naanu Avanalla...Avalu; Shivarajkumar – Vajrakaya; Yash – Masterpiece	**Parul Yadav – Aatagara**; Mayuri Kyatari – Krishna Leela; Nabha Natesh – Vajrakaya; Rachita Ram – Ranna; Shanvi Srivastava – Masterpiece
Best Supporting Actor	Best Supporting Actress
**Saikumar – RangiTaranga**; Ananth Nag – Vaastu Prakaara; P. Ravi Shankar – Aatagara; Ramakrishna – Raja Rajendra; Sundar – Naanu Avanalla...Avalu	**Sudharani – Vaastu Prakaara**; Avantika Shetty – RangiTaranga; Chandrika – Kendasampige; Madhoo – Ranna; Pavana Gowda – Aatagara
Best Music Director	Best Lyricist
**Sridhar V. Sambhram – Krishna Leela**; Anup Bhandari – RangiTaranga; Arjun Janya – Vajrakaya; Jassie Gift – Luv U Alia; V. Harikrishna – Rhaatee	**Jayant Kaikini – "Nenape Nitya Mallige" from Kendasampige**; Kaviraj – "Nee Muddada" from Rathavara; Pavan Wadeyar – "Jagave Ondu Ranaranga" from Rana Vikrama; V. Nagendra Prasad – "Edeyal Yaro Ghazal" from Muddu Manase; Yogaraj Bhat – "Manege Naaku Moole" from Vaastu Prakaara
Best Playback Singer – Male	Best Playback Singer – Female
**Santhosh Venky – "Raja Raniyanthe" from Rhaatee**; Dhanush – "No Problem" from Vajrakaya; Javed Ali – "Sanje Veleli" from Luv U Alia; Karthik – "Nenape Nitya Mallige" from Kendasampige; Vijay Prakash – "Thuttoori Thalavarayya" from Bullet Basya	**Inchara Rao – "Kareyole" from RangiTaranga**; Anuradha Bhat – "Irali Heege" from Benkipatna; Indu Nagaraj – "Ka Thalkattu Kaa" from Mr. Airavata; Shreya Ghoshal – "Shuru Shuru" from 1st Rank Raju; Vani Harikrishna – "Raata Patta" from Rhaatee
Critics Best Actor	Critics Best Actress
**Sanchari Vijay** **– Naanu Avanalla...Avalu**	**Rachita Ram – Ranna**

==== Malayalam cinema ====
Best Film	Best Director
**Pathemari**; Anarkali; Charlie; Ennu Ninte Moideen; Premam	**R. S. Vimal – Ennu Ninte Moideen**; Alphonse Putharen – Premam; Martin Prakkat – Charlie; Salim Ahmed- Pathemari; V. K. Prakash – Nirnayakam
Best Actor	Best Actress
**Mammootty – Pathemari**; Dulquer Salman – Charlie; Jayasurya – Su Su Sudhi Vathmeekam; Nivin Pauly – Premam; Prithviraj Sukumaran – Ennu Ninte Moideen	**Parvathy Thiruvothu – Ennu Ninte Moideen**; Amala Paul – Mili; Anusree – Chandrettan Evideya; Mamta Mohandas – Two Countries; Manju Warrier – Rani Padmini
Best Supporting Actor	Best Supporting Actress
**Tovino Thomas – Ennu Ninte Moideen**; Biju Menon – Madhura Naranga; Indrajith Sukumaran – Amar Akbar Anthony; Nedumudi Venu – Charlie; Sreenivasan – Pathemari	**Lena – Ennu Ninte Moideen**; Ann Augustine – Nee-Na; Aparna Gopinath – Charlie; Miya – Anarkali; Namitha Pramod – Chandrettan Evideya
Best Music Director	Best Lyricist
**M. Jayachandran – Ennu Ninte Moideen**; Bijibal – Pathemari; Gopi Sunder – Charlie; Rajesh Murugesan – Premam; Vidyasagar – Ennum Eppozhum	**Rafeeq Ahamed – "Kaathirunnu" from Ennu Ninte Moideen**; BK Harinarayanan – "Manju Peyyume" from Mili; Rafeeq Ahamed – "Oru Karimukilinu" from Charlie; Rafeeq Ahamed – "Padiyirangunnu" from Pathemari; Shabareesh Varma – "Malare" from Premam
Best Playback Singer – Male	Best Playback Singer – Female
**Vijay Yesudas – "Malare" from Premam**; Hariharan – "Padiyirangunnu" from Pathemari; Najim Arshad – "Manju Peyyume" from Mili; P. Jayachandran – "Malarvaka Kombath" from Ennum Eppozhum; Vijay Yesudas – "Hemanthamen" from Kohinoor	**Shreya Ghoshal – "Kaathirunnu" from Ennu Ninte Moideen**; Chitra Arun – "Oru Makara Nilavayi" from Rani Padmini; Shreya Ghoshal – "Mele Mele" from Life of Josutty; Shweta Mohan – "Kayampoo Niramayi" from Su Su Sudhi Vathmeekam; Vaikom Vijayalakshmi – "Kaikkottum" from Oru Vadakkan Selfie
Critics Best Actor	Critics Best Actress
**Jayasurya** **– Su Su Sudhi Vathmeekam**	**Amala Paul** **– Mili**

==== Tamil cinema ====
Best Film	Best Director
**Kaaka Muttai**; 36 Vayathinile; I; OK Kanmani; Papanasam; Thani Oruvan	**Mohan Raja – Thani Oruvan**; Jithu Joseph – Papanasam; Mani Ratnam – OK Kanmani; M. Manikandan – Kaaka Muttai; Roshan Andrews – 36 Vayadhinile; Shankar – I
Best Actor	Best Actress
**Vikram – I**; Ajith Kumar – Yennai Arindhaal; Dhanush – Anegan; Jayam Ravi – Thani Oruvan; Kamal Haasan – Papanasam	**Nayantara – Naanum Rowdy Dhaan**; Aishwarya Rajesh – Kaaka Muttai; Gautami – Papanasam; Jyothika – 36 Vayadhinile; Nithya Menen – OK Kanmani
Best Supporting Actor	Best Supporting Actress
**Arvind Swamy – Thani Oruvan**; Arun Vijay – Yennai Arindhaal; K. S. Ravikumar – Thanga Magan; Prakash Raj – OK Kanmani; R. Parthiepan – Naanum Rowdy Dhaan	**Radhika – Thanga Magan**; Asha Sarath – Papanasam; Devadarshini – 36 Vayadhinile; Leela Samson – OK Kanmani; Parvathy Nair – Yennai Arindhaal
Best Music Director	Best Lyricist
**A. R. Rahman – I**; Anirudh Ravichander – Maari; Anirudh Ravichander – Naanum Rowdy Dhaan; A. R. Rahman – OK Kanmani; Harris Jayaraj – Yennai Arindhaal	**Madhan Karky – "Pookkale Sattru" from I**; Kabilan – "Ennodu Nee Irundhaal" from I; Thamarai – "Unakenna Venum Sollu" from Yennai Arindhaal; Vignesh Shivan – "Thangamey" from Naanum Rowdy Dhaan; Vivek – "Vaadi Rasaathi" from 36 Vayadhinile
Best Playback Singer – Male	Best Playback Singer – Female
**Sid Sriram – "Ennodu Nee Irundhaal" from I**; Anirudh Ravichander – "Thangamey" from Naanum Rowdy Dhaan; A. R. Rahman – "Mental Manadhil" from OK Kanmani; Dhanush – "Oh Ohh" from Thanga Magan; Vijay – "Yeandi Yeandi" from Puli	**Swetha Mohan – "Enna Solla" from Thanga Magan**; Kharesma Ravichandran – "Kadhal Cricket" from Thani Oruvan; Neeti Mohan – "Neeyum Naanum" from Naanum Rowdy Dhaan; Shreya Ghoshal – "Pookkale Sattru" from I; Shruti Haasan – "Yeandi Yeandi" from Puli
Critics Best Actor	Critics Best Actress
**Jayam Ravi** **– Thani Oruvan**	**Jyotika** **– 36 Vayadhinile**

==== Telugu cinema ====
Best Film	Best Director
**Baahubali: The Beginning**; Bhale Bhale Magadivoy; Malli Malli Idi Rani Roju; Kanche; Srimanthudu	**S. S. Rajamouli – Baahubali: The Beginning**; Koratala Siva – Srimanthudu; Kranthi Madhav – Malli Malli Idi Rani Roju; Krish – Kanche; Trivikram Srinivas – S/O Satyamurthy
Best Actor	Best Actress
**Mahesh Babu – Srimanthudu**; Allu Arjun – S/O Satyamurthy; Nani – Bhale Bhale Magadivoy; N. T. Rama Rao Jr. – Temper; Prabhas – Baahubali: The Beginning	**Anushka Shetty – Rudhramadevi**; Hebah Patel – Kumari 21F; Nithya Menen – Malli Malli Idi Rani Roju; Shruti Haasan – Srimanthudu; Tamannaah Bhatia – Baahubali: The Beginning
Best Supporting Actor	Best Supporting Actress
**Allu Arjun – Rudhramadevi**; Jagapati Babu – Srimanthudu; Posani Krishna Murali – Temper; Rana Daggubati – Baahubali: The Beginning; Sathyaraj – Baahubali: The Beginning	**Ramya Krishna – Baahubali: The Beginning**; Kriti Kharbanda – Bruce Lee - The Fighter; Pavithra Lokesh – Malli Malli Idi Rani Roju; Revathi – Loafer; Sukrithi – Kerintha
Best Music Director	Best Lyricist
**Devi Sri Prasad – Srimanthudu**; Anoop Rubens – Gopala Gopala; Chirantan Bhat – Kanche; Gopi Sunder – Malli Malli Idi Rani Roju; M. M. Keeravani – Baahubali: The Beginning	**Sirivennela Seetharama Sastry – "Raa Mundadugeddam" from Kanche**; Anantha Sreeram & Sri Mani – "Meghalu Lekunna" from Kumari 21F; Chandrabose – "Enduko Enduko" from Gopala Gopala; Ramajogayya Sastry – "Pora Srimanthuda" from Srimanthudu; Sri Mani – "Sithakalam Suryudulaga" from S/O Satyamurthy
Best Playback Singer – Male	Best Playback Singer – Female
**M. L. R. Karthikeyan – "Pora Srimanthuda" from Srimanthudu**; Dhanunjay – "Bhaje Bhaje" from Gopala Gopala; Keerthi Sagathia – "Neeku Theliyanida" from Kanche; Yazin Nizar – "Meghalu Lekunna" from Kumari 21F; Yazin Nizar – "Charusheela" from Srimanthudu	**Geetha Madhuri – "Jeevanadhi" from Baahubali: The Beginning**; Aishwarya/K. S. Chithra – "Marhaba" from Malli Malli Idi Rani Roju; Jonita Gandhi – "Ye Katha" from Kerintha; Mohana Bhogaraju – "Size Sexy" from Size Zero; Shreya Ghoshal – "Nijamenani" from Kanche
Critics Best Actor	Critics Best Actress
**Nani** **– Bhale Bhale Magadivoy**	**Nithya Menen** **– Malli Malli Idhi Rani Roju**

=== Technical Awards ===
Best Cinematographer – South
- **K. K. Senthil Kumar (Telugu) –** **Baahubali: The Beginning**
Best Choreography
- **Sekhar (Telugu)** – **"Kung Fu Kumaari" from Bruce Lee: The Fighter**

=== Special awards ===
Lifetime Achievement
- **Mohan Babu** (Actor)
Best Male Debut
- **Akhil Akkineni for Akhil**
- **G. V. Prakash Kumar for Darling**
Best Female Debut
- **Pragya Jaiswal for Kanche**
- **Sai Pallavi for Premam**
