= Kanche =

2015 Indian film by Krish Jagarlamudi

- Theatrical release poster
- Directed by: Krish Jagarlamudi
- Screenplay by: Krish Jagarlamudi
- Dialogues by: Sai Madhav Burra
- Story by: Krish Jagarlamudi
- Produced by: Yeduguru Rajeev Reddy; Saibabu Jagarlamudi
- Starring: Varun Tej; Pragya Jaiswal; Nikitin Dheer
- Cinematography: Gnana Shekar V. S.
- Edited by: Suraj Jagtap; Rama Krishna Arram
- Music by: Chirantan Bhatt
- Production company: First Frame Entertainment
- Release date: 22 October 2015
- Running time: 125 minutes
- Country: India
- Language: Telugu
- Budget: ₹18 crore
- Box office: est. ₹20 crore

Kanche (transl. The Fence) is a 2015 Indian Telugu-language romantic action drama film written and directed by Krish. It stars Varun Tej, Pragya Jaiswal, and Nikitin Dheer. Produced by First Frame Entertainment, Kanche revolves around the enmity between two friends—Dhupati Haribabu (Tej) and Eeswar Prasad (Dheer). Eeswar's sister Sitadevi (Jaiswal) and Haribabu graduate from the University of Madras in the late 1930s and fall in love. Due to the prevailing casteism in their native village, Eeswar opposes their relationship and kills Sitadevi accidentally. Years later, Haribabu joins the British Indian Army as a captain to fight against the Axis powers in World War II and Eeswar, now a colonel, is his commanding officer.

Krish began research on the film's subject after seeing a bomb, dropped by the Imperial Japanese Army, preserved in a museum in Visakhapatnam during the filming of Vedam (2010). He worked on the film's screenplay for nine-and-a-half months and considered it his most ambitious project. Chirantan Bhatt composed the film's songs and score, marking his debut in Telugu cinema. Gnana Shekar V. S. was the film's director of photography; Sahi Suresh was the film's art director, and Sai Madhav Burra wrote the film's dialogue.

Principal photography commenced on 27 February 2015 in Hyderabad. Kanche was filmed in Tatipaka, Draksharamam, Kapotavaram, and in Peruru Agraharam near Palakollu. Major sets were erected in Ramoji Film City, Hyderabad. The war sequences were filmed in Georgia and the film's unit was allotted 700 guns, four tanks, and a machine gun from the Georgia Military Institute, a military training school. Principal photography was wrapped up on 6 July 2015. Kanche was filmed in 55 working days, 35 of which were in Georgia.

Promoted as Telugu cinema's first World War II-based film, Kanche was released worldwide on 22 October 2015, on 700 screens, and received a positive reception from critics. It grossed ₹20 crore on a budget of ₹18 crore, and became the 14th highest-grossing Telugu film of the year. Kanche earned the National Film Award for Best Feature Film in Telugu at the 63rd National Film Awards ceremony, and the state Nandi Award for Best Film on National Integration. The film was screened at the 2016 edition of All Lights India International Film Festival. The film is considered one of the "25 Greatest Telugu Films Of The Decade" by Film Companion. It also won the state Gaddar Award for Second Best Feature Film.

== Plot ==
In 1936, Dhupati Haribabu and Rachakonda Sitadevi meet at the Madras Cultural Club in Madras Presidency on the latter's birthday and realise that they are studying at the same college, the University of Madras. Sitadevi is the princess of the Rachakonda estate, whereas Haribabu belongs to a lower caste and is the grandson of a local barber. By the time they graduate, they have fallen in love, and leave for their native town, Devarakonda. Haribabu is introduced to Sitadevi's brother Eeswar and they become friends.

Eeswar, and his grandfather Pedababu, learn of Haribabu and Sitadevi's affair and instigate a fight between people of both castes. Hundreds of people from both sides die and a fence (Kanche) is erected to separate the two groups forever. While Eeswar and Pedababu decide to marry off Sitadevi to a boy of their choice, Haribabu arrives back from town and is stabbed. Sitadevi looks after him secretly in her bedroom, and on the wedding day, a frustrated Haribabu marries Sitadevi, in the presence of her grandmother, and leaves. That evening, Eeswar and Haribabu duel, and in the process Sitadevi is killed accidentally.

During World War II, as a member of the allied nations, the British Raj send over two and a half million Indian volunteer soldiers to fight under British command against the Axis powers. Haribabu joins them as a captain and Eeswar, now a colonel, is his commanding officer. In May 1944, the Nazis attack the Indian army in the Italian Campaign, and capture them. Haribabu, his friend Dasu, and three other soldiers escape. They decide to save the captured troops and follow the Nazis. They take shelter in an Italian baker's house and his granddaughter saves them from the Nazis. She reveals that the Nazis want to kill a little girl whose parents were a German doctor and a Jew.

The Nazis find the doctor and a group of civilians, and Haribabu, along with his cohorts, rescues them. The soldiers find the captured troops in an old building and rescue them from the Nazis. When Eeswar asks Haribabu why he saved him despite the rivalry between them, he replies that Sitadevi's love for Eeswar made him do so. They leave with the civilians and find a German base near a river which they can use to escape.

When Haribabu formulates a plan, Eeswar, who still hates him, points out that the plan is flawed. Haribabu reminds him that World War II commenced because of racism and he does not want to see the same bloodshed repeated here that happened in their village. The soldiers raid all the tents and find a boat in which the civilians and the other soldier board. To divert the German army's attention, Haribabu continues to fight alone until the boat reaches safety. Severely injured, Haribabu dies with a smile, thinking of the memories of his life with Sitadevi.

Eeswar is shocked to see Haribabu die and carries his body back to his village. He also reads the letters Haribabu had written to Sitadevi during the war and realises that humans should not be divided by caste. He reaches the village and asks Haribabu's grandfather to dig the grave. Eeswar calls Haribabu a great human, soldier, lover, son and mainly a good friend whom he never recognised. He acknowledges that without the borders of caste, Haribabu would have been happy with Sitadevi and salutes him. Pedababu orders the fences' removal and the people continue to live in peace.

== Cast ==
- Varun Tej as Dhupati Haribabu
- Pragya Jaiswal as Rachakonda Sitadevi
- Nikitin Dheer as Eeswar Prasad (Voice dubbed by Vedala Hemachandra)
- Srinivas Avasarala as Dasu, Haribabu's friend
- Gollapudi Maruti Rao as Kondayya, Haribabu's grandfather
- Sowcar Janaki as Mahalakshmamma, Sitadevi's grandmother
- Anoop Puri as Pedababu, Sitadevi's grandfather
- Ravi Prakash as Janardhana Sastry
- Satyam Rajesh as Muniswamy
- Posani Krishna Murali as Elamanda
- Lasha Kankava as SS Officer Muller
- Singeetham Srinivasa Rao as a pianist in Madras Cultural Club (cameo appearance)

== Production ==
=== Development ===
During the filming of Vedam (2010) in Visakhapatnam, Krish visited a museum which displayed a bomb dropped by the Imperial Japanese Army on the city during World War II. The bomb was used with the intention of creating a situation similar to the attack on Pearl Harbor. After further research, Krish learned that over 2.5 million Indian soldiers participated in World War II, and 2000 Telugu people from Madhavaram, West Godavari, were sent to the war by the British government in India. Krish worked on the film's screenplay for nine-and-a-half months and cited the process of obtaining accurate details as the reason for the length of time it took to finish. Krish gathered most of the information using the Google search engine and two teams were employed—one in India, the other in Italy. He chose to narrate a love story set in the 1930s and focused on the macro and micro divisions between people, countries, races and religions.

During the production of Gabbar Is Back, Krish's collaboration with Varun Tej was reported in January 2015; Ramoji Rao was to produce the film under the banner Ushakiron Movies jointly with Krish's banner First Frame Entertainment. Pragya Jaiswal, who auditioned for Gabbar Is Back, was signed as the film's female lead. The film was officially launched on 27 February in Hyderabad and was titled Kanche. Kanche translates to fence in English and Krish relates that the film focuses on the effects of a fence on friendship. On the 75th anniversary of World War II, Krish told the Indo-Asian News Service on 1 September that Kanche is his "most ambitious project" and also the first Telugu film set in World War II.

Sai Madhav Burra, who collaborated with Krish on Krishnam Vande Jagadgurum (2013), was signed to write the film's dialogues. V. S. Gnanasekhar was signed as the film's director of photography, and Sahi Suresh was selected as the film's art director. Because of discontinuing his studies at a young age, Suresh was not knowledgeable about World War II, and spent three to four months watching old war films and reading about the war. Chirantan Bhatt, who collaborated earlier with Krish on Gabbar Is Back, was signed to compose the film's soundtrack and score. Kanche marked Bhatt's debut in Telugu cinema. Rama Krishna Arram and Suraj Jagtap edited the film. Kanche was produced on a budget of ₹18 crore.

=== Casting ===
Varun Tej played the role of Dhupati Haribabu, a captain in the British Indian Army. Varun Tej described the first phase of Haribabu's character as a 23-year old "college pass-out, happy-go-lucky, chilled out guy". He had to modify his diction according to the timeline and observed the dialogue delivery of actors in old Telugu films. For the second phase, Varun Tej was trained by an army officer on a soldier's body language, and the way to hold guns among other things. He watched films like Saving Private Ryan (1988), The Thin Red Line (1998), Inglourious Basterds (2009), and Fury (2014) as well. He underwent training in a boot camp for more than a week, during the gap between the Indian and Georgia schedules. During the filming of the war sequences in Georgia, Varun Tej was provided with an original Thompson submachine gun, which was manufactured in 1939, and used during the actual war.

Jaiswal played the role of Sitadevi, a princess whose character was modelled on Maharani Gayatri Devi of Jaipur. After auditioning for the role, Jaiswal watched Krish's Vedam and Krishnam Vande Jagadgurum to understand his work and was "really touched" by the former. Krish advised her not to watch any old Telugu films but try to analyse old English and Hindi films instead. Jaiswal opined that her character needed to focus "more on expressions than acting". She joined kathak classes after the film's shoot began, and no workshops were conducted for her.

Nikitin Dheer was chosen to play Colonel Eeswar Prasad in the film, because Krish, who wanted an actor to match Varun Tej's persona, was impressed with his performance in Chennai Express (2013). Srinivas Avasarala was cast as Dasu, Haribabu's friend and another volunteer soldier from the British Indian Army, who quotes writer Sri Sri as his friend Srinivasa Rao. Avasarala was trained in the use of guns in Hyderabad and received training from an army officer along with Varun Tej on body language and other important aspects.

Gollapudi Maruthi Rao and Sowcar Janaki were cast as Haribabu's grandfather and Sitadevi's grandmother respectively. Filmmaker Singeetham Srinivasa Rao made a cameo appearance as a pianist in Madras Cultural Club, where Haribabu works as a part-time employee. Krish described Rao's cameo as a "colourful" one and added that his look was inspired by that of Colonel Sanders, the founder of Kentucky Fried Chicken. 700 people were required to form an army and the film's unit selected nearly 100 non-resident Indians apart from the local people. They were given formal training before they went on the film's sets.

=== Filming ===
It was like a proper military camp that we were living in. There were tents on the location and we pretty much lived there. Georgia has sunsets at 9 pm and we used to begin shooting in the morning at 6 am and wrap up only after the sunset. There were 400-500 people on the sets on an average day.

— Varun Tej on film's shoot in Georgia with The Times of India

Principal photography commenced on 27 February 2015 at Hyderabad. The second schedule commenced on 23 March at Tatipaka, a village near Razole in East Godavari district of Andhra Pradesh. Apart from Draksharamam and Kapotavaram, the village portions were filmed in Peruru Agraharam, Palakollu as Krish wanted a primitive settlement with poor infrastructure and palaces, resembling one of the pre-independence era. The film's crew then put up flower and fruit markets, and purchased antiques from a flea market. The local people extended their support to the film's crew in return for the laying down of proper roads. In other villages where there was better infrastructure, Suresh and his crew spoke to village heads and covered most of the roads with sand and mud. The houses were whitewashed for the film's shoot and were restored with their previous colours later.

As all the houses in those villages were constructed using reinforced concrete, a team of 70 members were summoned from Hyderabad to recreate the 1940s style. According to Suresh, the "nativity feel came alive" due to the presence of coconut trees. The steam engine and the interiors of the first-class compartments in the train Haribabu and Sitadevi travel in from Madras to Devarakonda were designed in Ramoji Film City, Hyderabad. Suresh's experience working as an art director on Venkatadri Express (2013) helped him. The construction of the palace where Sitadevi lives took four to five days to complete at a cost of ₹40 lakh. The war sequences were filmed in Georgia. The film's crew finalised 20 locations and the filming of the war sequences lasted for 35 days.

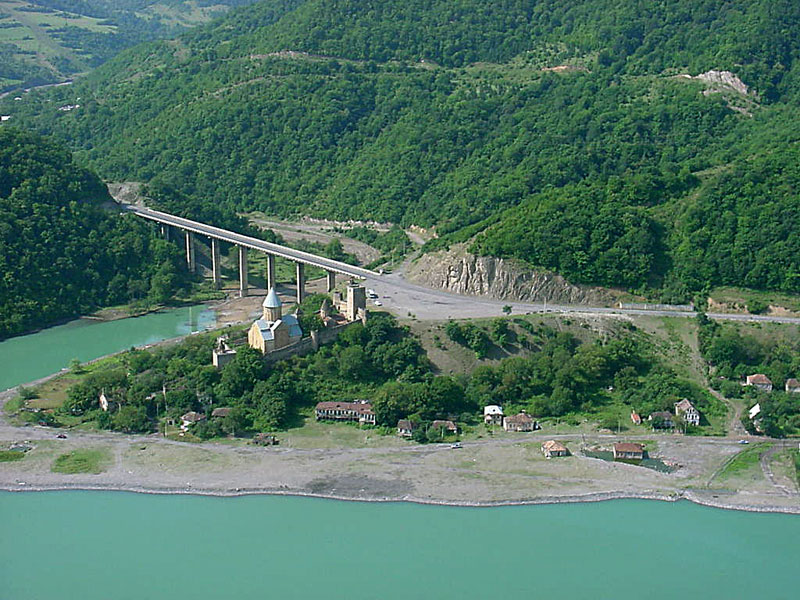
Few key sequences were filmed at the Ananuri Bridge (pictured) in Tbilisi, Georgia.

With the assistance of the Government of Georgia, huge sets were erected, including a German military base camp fitted with trenches and bunkers. For the film's shoot, Krish hired a few telegraph machines, typewriters, and coffee cups and saucers manufactured during the timeline of the World War II. Some key action sequences were filmed in a few old, dilapidated buildings located near Georgia and Varun Tej performed his stunts without a body double. A few sequences were filmed at the Ananuri Bridge in Tbilisi, Georgia.

700 guns, four tanks, and a machine gun used in the war were allotted from the Georgia Military Institute military school. The Georgian Armed Forces trained the film's unit to use these weapons properly. The rent for each tank was 5000 dollars per day, and another tank was designed by Suresh and his crew. Thousands of bullets were used every day and 15 people were employed to load the guns. On the last day of the filming of the climax episode, Varun Tej used more than 7000 bullets. For filming few bomb-blast sequences, the film's unit consulted several Hollywood technicians. Principal photography was wrapped up on 6 July, after a shoot of 55 working days.

== Music ==
The official soundtrack of Kanche composed by Chirantan Bhatt consists of six songs, including instrumental theme music. The lyrics for the remaining five songs were penned by Sirivennela Sitaramasastri. Kanche marked Bhatt's debut in South Indian cinema. The soundtrack, marketed by Aditya Music, was released on eve of Gandhi Jayanthi (1 October 2015) at a promotional event on the same day at Hyderabad.

== Release ==
Kanche was initially scheduled for a worldwide release on 2 October 2015. The film's release was postponed to 6 November to avoid clashing with the releases of Puli and Singh Is Bliing. Due to a delay in post-production activities, Akhil: The Power of Jua, which was initially scheduled for a worldwide release on 22 October, was postponed and Kanche was confirmed for release on 22 October during the Vijayadasami festival season. Kanche was released at 400 screens across Andhra Pradesh and Telangana, and at 150 screens in rest of India. Though 80 screens were booked initially in the overseas market for the film's release, the screen count was later increased to 150, of which 130 screens were in the United States.

== Reception ==
=== Critical reception ===
Kanche received positive reviews from the critics. Sangeetha Devi Dundoo of The Hindu remarked that Kanche is a film that does not stand out "merely by being different, but also because it’s earnest", and added that Krish "Step[s] across the fence to a new world of storytelling". Praising Krish's choice of genre, Suresh Kavirayani of the Deccan Chronicle gave the film 3.5 stars out of 5, stating, "If you are looking for a change from the regular action-masala-song-dance-drama kind of films, you should watch Kanche". Kavirayani added: "The war scenes look authentic. Credit to cinematographer Gnana Sekar V.S for capturing the war scenes. Kanche is no less than any Hollywood film as far as the war scenes are concerned". Rajeswari Kalyanam of The Hans India also gave the film 3.5 stars out of 5 and stated: "With Kanche, Jagarlamudi Krish has once again proven his ability to choose an offbeat theme, weave an engrossing tale and give it a technically brilliant cinematic rendition".

Pranita Jonnalagedda of The Times of India gave Kanche 3 stars out of 5 and stated: "Kanche is a daring attempt for mainstream [Telugu cinema]. While there's an interesting story which is told really well, you will be left with the lingering feeling that it could have been a lot better". Sify too gave Kanche 3 stars out of 5 and called it a film that is "[s]uitable only for discerning audiences" and praised the storyline, performances, production design, and dialogues. Behindwoods gave the film 3 stars out of 5 as well and called it a "commendable attempt" and added:

You don’t get to see too many Indian films being made on war, especially South Indian industry hasn’t made many. (sic) Even the ones that have been made have not made a huge impact, especially with it comes to battle scenes. But that is where Kanche scores big time. The war sequence looks authoritative and intriguing. It travels throughout and the intensity has been maintained right through".

=== Box office ===
Kanche grossed approximately ₹5.5 crore and collected a distributor share of ₹3.85 crore globally, thereby performing better than Raju Gari Gadhi and Columbus. According to trade analyst Taran Adarsh, Kanche earned US$53,057 from its paid previews; it amassed US$46,751 on its first day and US$92,998 on its second day, taking its two-day United States box office total to US$192,806 (₹1.25 crore). The first weekend global box office gross and distributor share figures stood at approximately ₹13 crore and ₹7 crore respectively.

In its first weekend at the United States box office, Kanche collected US$380,361 (₹2.47 crore). It earned US$6,826 (₹4.43 lakh) from two screens in Canada and MYR15,921 (₹2.43 lakh) from 2 screens at the Malaysian box office in its opening weekend, thereby managing to recover 100% of the overseas distributors' investments. In ten days, Kanche collected US$489,701 (₹3.21 crore) at the United States box office, US$9,261 (₹6.07 lakh) at the Canada box office, and MYR19,316 (₹2.95 lakh) at the Malaysian box office respectively, taking its ten-day overseas box office total to US$503,461 (₹3.3 crore).

Kanche earned US$522,325 (₹3.47 crore) in 17 days at the United States box office. After losing many screens due to new releases in the United States, Kanche's 31-day total stood at US$527,724 (₹3.5 crore). In its lifetime run, Kanche grossed ₹20 crore globally, with a distributor share of ₹14 crore, and was declared a commercial success and also the 14th highest grossing Telugu film of the year.

== Accolades ==
Kanche earned the National Film Award for Best Feature Film in Telugu at the 63rd National Film Awards ceremony. Kanche earned the state Nandi Award for Best film on National Integration, and was screened at the 2016 edition of All Lights India International Film Festival in the "Indywood Panorama" section.

Award (Note: Awards are in Alphabetical order.)	Date of ceremony (Note: Date is linked to the article about the awards held that year, wherever possible.)	Category	Recipient(s)	Result	Ref.
CineMAA Awards	12 June 2016	Best Story	Krish	Won	
CineMAA Awards	12 June 2016	Special Appreciation Award	Krish	Won	
CineMAA Awards	12 June 2016	Best Debut Actress	Pragya Jaiswal	Won	
CineMAA Awards	12 June 2016	Best Background score	Chirrantan Bhatt	Won	
CineMAA Awards	12 June 2016	Best Lyricist	Sirivennela Seetharama Sastry for ("Raa Mundadugeddam")	Won	
Filmfare Awards South	18 June 2016	Best Film – Telugu	Kanche	Nominated	
Filmfare Awards South	18 June 2016	Best Director – Telugu	Krish	Nominated	
Filmfare Awards South	18 June 2016	Best Female Debut – Telugu	Pragya Jaiswal	Won	
Filmfare Awards South	18 June 2016	Best Music Director – Telugu	Chirrantan Bhatt	Nominated	
Filmfare Awards South	18 June 2016	Best Lyricist – Telugu	Sirivennela Seetharama Sastry for ("Raa Mundadugeddam")	Won	
Filmfare Awards South	18 June 2016	Best Male Playback Singer – Telugu	Keerthi Sagathia for ("Neeku Theliyanida")	Nominated	
Filmfare Awards South	18 June 2016	Best Female Playback Singer – Telugu	Shreya Ghoshal for ("Nijamenani")	Nominated	
IIFA Utsavam	28 – 29 March 2017	Best Director – Telugu	Krish	Nominated	
IIFA Utsavam	28 – 29 March 2017	Best Story – Telugu	Krish	Won	
IIFA Utsavam	28 – 29 March 2017	Best Actress – Telugu	Pragya Jaiswal	Nominated	
IIFA Utsavam	28 – 29 March 2017	Best Performance In A Comic Role – Telugu	Srinivas Avasarala	Nominated	
IIFA Utsavam	28 – 29 March 2017	Best Female Playback Singer – Telugu	Shreya Ghoshal for ("Itu Itu Ani")	Nominated	
Mirchi Music Awards South	27 July 2016	Album of the Year	Kanche – Chirrantan Bhatt	Nominated	
Mirchi Music Awards South	27 July 2016	Music Composer of the Year	Chirrantan Bhatt for ("Itu Itu Ani")	Nominated	
Mirchi Music Awards South	27 July 2016	Lyricist of the Year	Sirivennela Seetharama Sastry for ("Raa Mundadugeddam")	Won	
Mirchi Music Awards South	27 July 2016	Lyricist of the Year	Sirivennela Seetharama Sastry for ("Itu Itu Ani")	Nominated	
Mirchi Music Awards South	27 July 2016	Female Vocalist of the Year	Shreya Ghoshal for ("Nijamenani Nammani")	Nominated	
Mirchi Music Awards South	27 July 2016	Song of the Year	"Itu Itu Ani"	Nominated	
Nandi Awards	14 November 2017	Sarojini Devi Award for a Film on National Integration	Y. Rajeev Reddy, J. Sai Babu and Krish	Won	
National Film Awards	3 May 2016	Best Feature Film in Telugu	Y. Rajeev Reddy, J. Sai Babu and Krish	Won	
Santosham Film Awards	14 August 2016	Best Lyricist	Sirivennela Seetharama Sastry	Won	
South Indian International Movie Awards	30 June – 1 July 2016	SIIMA Award for Best Film – Telugu	Kanche – Y. Rajeev Reddy & J. Sai Babu	Nominated	
South Indian International Movie Awards	30 June – 1 July 2016	SIIMA Award for Best Director – Telugu	Krish	Nominated	
South Indian International Movie Awards	30 June – 1 July 2016	SIIMA Award for Best Actor – Telugu	Varun Tej	Nominated	
South Indian International Movie Awards	30 June – 1 July 2016	SIIMA Award for Best Female Debut – Telugu	Pragya Jaiswal	Won	
South Indian International Movie Awards	30 June – 1 July 2016	SIIMA Award for Best Lyricist – Telugu	Sirivennela Seetharama Sastry for ("Itu Itu Ani")	Won	
South Indian International Movie Awards	30 June – 1 July 2016	Best Female Playback Singer – Telugu	Shreya Ghoshal for ("Nijamenani Nammani")	Nominated	
