= Masti's =

- Promotional poster
- Genre: Drama
- Created by: Krish Jagarlamudi
- Written by: Krish Jagarlamudi
- Directed by: Ajay Bhuyan
- Starring: Navdeep; Hebah Patel; Bindu Madhavi; Chandini Chowdary; Akshara Gowda; Raja Chembolu
- Composer: Smaran
- Country of origin: India
- Original language: Telugu
- No. of seasons: 1
- No. of episodes: 8

Original release
- Network: Aha
- Release: 8 February 2020

Masti's is a 2020 Indian Telugu-language drama streaming television miniseries written by Krish Jagarlamudi and directed by Ajay Bhuyan. It stars Navdeep, Hebah Patel, Bindu Madhavi, Chandini Chowdary, Akshara Gowda and Raja Chembolu. The series released to mixed to positive reviews from critics.

== Cast ==
- Navdeep as Pranav
- Raja Chembolu as Anand
- Hebah Patel as Tanya
- Bindu Madhavi as Gowri
- Chandini Chowdary as Lekha
- Akshara Gowda as Simran
- Siddharth Gollapudi as Deepak

== Soundtrack ==
The music was composed by Smaran.

Masti's

Soundtrack album by Smaran
- Released: 2020
- Length: 33:08
- Language: Telugu

Smaran chronology
Kotha Poradu (2020)	Masti's (2020)	Pitta Kathalu (2021)

Official audio
- Masti's - Full Jukebox on YouTube

Track listing
No.	Title	Lyrics	Singer(s)	Length
1.	"Theme/Kuduruga Nilavani"	Niklesh Sunkoji	Damini Bhatla, Krishna
2.	"Good Old Blues"	Smaran	Damini
3.	"Feels Good"	Smaran	Damini, Smaran
4.	"Just a Matter of Time & Pretty Babe"	Smaran	Venu
5.	"Khali Peeli"	Niklesh Sunkoji	Smaran
6.	"Rock Paper Scissors"		Taniya, Karthik, Dinesh Bunty, Rishi
Total length:				33:08

== Reception ==
Neeshita Nyayapati of The Times of India rated the series 2 1/2 out of 5 and wrote that "Masti’s is one of those rare shows that manage to humanise its flawed characters without glorifying them. Each of them come with their own set of problems and every single one of them get closure. But it's due to lacking emotional depth such characters warrant, the series passes muster".

On the contrary, Srivathsan Nadadhur of Binged rated the series six out of ten and wrote that "Masti’s is the closest that the Telugu digital space has got in representing the concerns of an urban lot right".
