= Ghaati =

2025 Indian film by Krish Jagarlamudi

- Theatrical release poster
- Directed by: Krish Jagarlamudi
- Written by: Chintakindi Srinivas Rao
- Produced by: Yeduguru Rajeev Reddy; Saibabu Jagarlamudi
- Starring: Vikram Prabhu; Anushka Shetty
- Cinematography: Manojh Reddy Katasani
- Edited by: Chanakya Reddy Toorupu
- Music by: Nagavelli Vidya Sagar
- Production companies: First Frame Entertainments; UV Creations
- Release date: 5 September 2025
- Running time: 155 minutes
- Country: India
- Language: Telugu

Ghaati is a 2025 Indian Telugu-language action crime drama film directed by Krish Jagarlamudi. Yeduguru Rajeev Reddy and Saibabu Jagarlamudi produced the film under First Frame Entertainments, and it was presented by UV Creations. It stars Anushka Shetty in the lead role along with Vikram Prabhu, Chaitanya Rao Madadi, and Jagapathi Babu in supporting roles. The film was released on 5 September 2025 and received mixed reviews, with most critics praising Shetty's performance.

== Plot ==
Sheelavathi, a bus conductor, and Desi Raju, a medical laboratory technician, are childhood sweethearts from the Ghaati community. The cannabis trade in their region is controlled by the brothers Kaashtal Naidu and Kundhul Naidu, who exploit the Ghaatis and keep them in debt. To clear Desi Raju's debts and help their community, Sheelavathi persuades him to use his scientific training to produce liquid cannabis, a more potent form of the drug that can be smuggled without using the brothers' routes. The operation earns large sums and threatens the Naidus' hold on the trade. The brothers first approach the couple as potential partners, as they are also trying to enter the liquid cannabis business.

The conflict escalates, and on the day of Sheelavathi and Desi Raju's wedding, the Naidu brothers' gang attacks the couple and their community. Desi Raju is killed and Sheelavathi is humiliated. She then sets out to take revenge on the Naidu brothers and on others who exploit the Ghaatis, including the police inspector Bhupathi Raja and the businessman Mahaveer Mandhani. Using her knowledge of the terrain, she becomes a feared figure in the region and finally confronts Kundhul Naidu. After her revenge, Sheelavathi resolves to end the cannabis trade and lead the Ghaatis towards an honest livelihood, the goal she had shared with Desi Raju.

== Cast ==
- Anushka Shetty as Sheelavathi
- Vikram Prabhu as Desi Raju
- Chaitanya Rao Madadi as Kundhul Naidu, Kaashtal Naidu's younger brother
- Jagapathi Babu as Vishwadeep Rao, Police Commissioner, Raghav Rudra Mulpuru
- Jisshu Sengupta as Mahaveer Mandhani, a business tycoon
- Ravindra Vijay as Kaashtal Naidu, head of a Drug Cartel and Kundhul Naidu's elder brother
- Devika Priyadarshini
- Larissa Bonesi as Nirali Roy, elite lobbyist and Mr. Mandhani's secretary
- VTV Ganesh as M.P. Bojjayya
- Jwala Koti as Koti
- Satya as Bhupesh
- Raju Sundaram as Pebbuli
- Prakruthi Kambam as Bisooli
- Hareesh Peradi
- Raja Chembolu

== Production ==
=== Development ===
On 19 March 2024, the project was announced at an Amazon Prime Video showcase event with the release of the first look. On 7 November 2024, the makers released a Poster and 47-second glimpse of the film on the occasion of Anushka Shetty's birthday. The makers announced the release date of the film with an intriguing video on 15 December 2024.

=== Casting ===
On 15 January 2025, an announcement was made regarding the debut of Vikram Prabhu in Telugu cinema portraying the role of Desi Raju.

== Release ==
=== Theatrical ===
Ghaati was released on 5 September 2025. The film was originally planned to release on 18 April 2025, but was postponed to 11 July 2025, before being postponed to its current date.

=== Home media ===
The film began streaming on Amazon Prime Video from 26 September 2025.

== Reception ==
While most reviewers praised the performance of Anushka Shetty, the film received mixed reviews from critics.

Sruthi Ganapathy Raman of The Hollywood Reporter India praised the film's premise, its setting on the Andhra–Odisha border and Shetty's commitment to the action scenes, but criticised the writing as tedious, the villains as one-note and the protagonist's transformation as coming too late.

According to trade sources cited by Deccan Chronicle, the film collected ₹2 crore (US$210,000) on its first day and ₹1.75 crore (US$180,000) on its second day in the Telugu states, against a reported budget of over ₹26 crore (US$2.7 million).
