= Filmfare Award for Best Lyricist – Telugu =

Indian annual film award

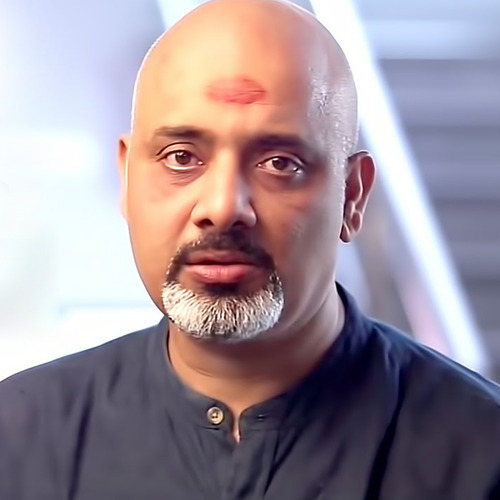
- The 2024 recipient: Ramajogayya Sastry
- Awarded for: Best work by a lyricist in Telugu films
- Country: India
- Presented by: Filmfare
- First award: Sirivennela Seetharama Sastry for "Ghal Ghal" from Nuvvostanante Nenoddantana (2005)
- Currently held by: Ramajogayya Sastry for "Chuttamalle" from Devara: Part 1 (2024)

Highlights
- Most awards: Sirivennela Seetharama Sastry (6)

The Filmfare Award for Best Lyricist – Telugu is given by the Filmfare magazine as part of its annual Filmfare Awards for Telugu films. The award was first given in 2005. Here is a list of the award winners and the films for which they won. Sirivennela Seetharama Sastry had won the award for a record six times.

== Winners ==
Year	Lyricist	Film	Song	Ref.
2024	Ramajogayya Sastry	Devara: Part 1	"Chuttamalle"
2023	Anantha Sriram	Baby	"O Rendu Prema Meghaalila"
2022	Sirivennela Seetharama Sastry (Note: Awarded posthumously)	Sita Ramam	"Kaanunna Kalyanam"
2020 / 21	Sirivennela Seetharama Sastry	Jaanu	"Life of Ram"
2019	AWARDS FUNCTION WAS SUSPENDED DUE TO COVID-19 PANDEMIC
2018	Chandrabose	Rangasthalam	"Entha Sakkagunnavey"
2017	M. M. Keeravani	Baahubali 2: The Conclusion	"Dandaalayyaa"
2016	Ramajogayya Sastry	Janatha Garage	"Pranaamam"
2015	Sirivennela Seetharama Sastry	Kanche	"Raa Mundadugeddham"
2014	Chandrabose	Manam	"Kanipenchina Maa Amma"
2013	Sri Mani	Atharintiki Daaredi	"Aaradugula Bullet"
2012	Anantha Sreeram	Yeto Vellipoyindhi Manasu	"Yedhi Yedhi"
2011	Jonnavithhula	Sri Rama Rajyam	"Jagadanandha Karaka Jaya"
2010	Ramajogayya Sastry	Khaleja	"Sada Siva Sanyasi"
2009	Sirivennela Seetharama Sastry	Mahatma	"Indiramma"
2008	Sirivennela Seetharama Sastry	Gamyam	"Entavaraku"
2007	Vanamali	Happy Days	"Arerey Arerey"
2006	Veturi	Godavari	"Vuppongele Godavari"
2005	Sirivennela Seetharama Sastry	Nuvvostanante Nenoddantana	"Ghal Ghal"
