= Gnana Shekar V. S. =

Indian cinematographer and painter

- Born: 17 February 1979 (age 47)
- Citizenship: India
- Occupation: Cinematographer
- Years active: 2010–present

Gnana Shekar V. S ISC. (born 1 June 1979) is an Indian cinematographer and painter. He marked his beginning with his student film titled Tetris which was an official selection at Cinéfondation, Cannes Film Festival. He gained critical recognition from his debut itself, as an independent cinematographer, with Vedam (2010). His work is noted for its realistic approach. In 2017, his work in Gautamiputra Satakarni received accolades and rave reviews for the unique way of painting the canvas of the silver screen using natural flame.

== Early life and education ==
Gnana Shekar's education was an irony. Being the son of a teacher, he never had an experience of schooling. He was a curious kid who picked up on his father's collection of literature. At an early age, his imagination took a swirl when he stumbled upon an illustrated magazine which evoked a sense of visualization in him.

As a fine arts student, he was influenced by great masters such as Vincent van Gogh and Niko Pirosmani, inspiring him to create intense spiritual artworks, in which he married a modernist sense of perspective with an authentic form. Though his first love was painting, later during a course, he wanted to mould his skill into photography.

== Art career ==
Painting the screen apart, Gnana Shekar has another love – painting the canvas. Blessed with a flair for the fine arts, the cinematographer showcased a collection of his works at Park Hyatt Hyderabad on 18 April 2015 and attended by the Art Lovers in the city.

Gnana will be exhibiting a new series of his paintings, on faces, in Georgia, where his favourite filmmaker Sergei Parajanov and painter Niko Pirosmani are from.

Gnana Shekar fond of acrylic colours. never uses a paint brush to paint. he paints with a thumb, it makes him feel more connected. He has also begun using computer generated graphic art, using geometric shapes to create a reflection of life.

== Filmography ==
=== Short films and documentaries ===
Year	Film	Director	Notes
2005	Here Is My Nocturne	Anirban Dutta	Screened in major Indian film festivals. Also been screened as a part of an exhibition on Indian art and popular culture in the Helsinki City art Museum, Finland.
2006	Tetris	Anirban Dutta	Official selection at Cinéfondation, Cannes Film Festival 2006
2007	Setu	Shyamal Karmakar	Official selection at 54th International Short Film Festival, Oberhausen - 2008 and won a special mention.
2007	Ranu	Shyamal Karmakar	Screened at Mumbai International Film Festival and International Film Festival of Kerala
2014	Chronicles of a Temple Painter	Shravan Katikaneni	Won Best Documentary award at IDSFFK - 2014, Thiruvananthapuram

=== As a cinematographer ===
Year	Film	Language	Notes
2010	Vedam	Telugu	
2011	Dhada	Telugu	
2011	Vaanam	Tamil	
2012	Krishnam Vande Jagadgurum	Telugu	
2014	Nuvvala Nenila	Telugu	
2015	Malli Malli Idi Rani Roju	Telugu	
2015	Dagudumootha Dandakor	Telugu	
2015	Kanche	Telugu	
2015	Maj Rati Keteki	Assamese	
2016	Majnu	Telugu	
2017	Gautamiputra Satakarni	Telugu	
2018	Antariksham 9000 KMPH	Telugu	
2019	Manikarnika: The Queen of Jhansi	Hindi	
2019	N.T.R: Kathanayakudu	Telugu	
2019	N.T.R: Mahanayakudu	Telugu	
2021	Gamanam	Telugu	
2023	IB71	Hindi	
2024	Sheeshmahal	Telugu	
2024	Manamey	Telugu	
2024	Jithender Reddy	Telugu	
2025	Hari Hara Veera Mallu	Telugu	
2025	Telusu Kada	Telugu	
2026	Nari Nari Naduma Murari	Telugu	

=== Television ===
Year	Title	Network
2025	Mayasabha	SonyLIV
