= Baig (surname) =

Baig is surname of multiple origins. It is an Islamic surname common in Indian subcontinent (Urdu: بیگ), from Turkish "beg / bey". It can also be a variant of Scottish Begg. Notable people with the surname include:

- Abaid Ullah Baig
- Abbas Ali Baig
- Adam Yuki Baig
- Adil Baig
- Afzal Baig
- Aima Baig
- Akbar Baig
- Alhaj Mutalib Baig
- Anwar Baig
- Arif Beg
- Asad Baig
- Asgar Baig
- Brian Baig, Trinidad and Tobago politician
- Diana Baig
- Enver Baig
- Faiz Baig
- Fazel Baig
- Habibullah Baig
- Idrees Baig
- Mehreen Baig
- Minhal Baig
- Mirza Baig
- Mirza Ali Baig
- Mirza Aslam Beg
- Mirza Farhatullah Baig
- Mirza Ikhtiar Baig
- Mirza Iqbal Baig
- Mirza Qaleech Baig
- Mirza Rahmat Baig
- Mirza Rashid Ali Baig
- Mirza Zain Baig
- Mohammad Ali Baig
- Mohammed Ali Baig
- Mohideen Baig
- Moiz Ullah Baig
- Murtuza Baig
- Mushtaq Ahmed Baig
- Mudassar Baig
- Muzaffar Hussain Baig
- Nadeem Baig (disambiguation), multiple persons
- Naeem Baig
- Najia Baig
- Natasha Baig
- Nadeem Baig (director)
- Obaidullah Baig
- Osman Ali Baig
- Qismat Baig
- R. Roshan Baig
- Rafia Qaseem Baig
- Samina Baig (born 1972), Pakistani mountaineer
- Salim Baig
- Salman Baig
- Shah Baig
- Shaukat Baig
- Sultan Baig
- Taher Ali Baig
- Tara Ali Baig
- Thokar Niaz Baig
- Waris Baig
- Wazir Baig
- Zaiba Baig

== See also ==
- Beg (surname)
