= Beggs (surname) =

Beggs (Irish: Ó Beig) is a Gaelic surname, which originated in Scotland. It is derived from the Gaelic word beag, which means little, although some instances of the name derive from the English name 'Bigg'. As a result of migration Beggs live in Ireland, Scotland, England, United States, Canada, Australia, and New Zealand. It was first found in Inverness-shire, where they held a family seat from ancient times. Spelling variants include Begg, Begge or Beg The name is rare and its bearers primarily reside in Northern Ireland.

In 1890 an estimated 1340 bore the name, primarily in County Antrim and County Dublin. In the 1980s half of its bearers in Ireland were located in County Antrim and in the mid-1800s it was almost exclusively contained to the barony of Antrim Upper.

== People ==
- Bobby Beggs, Irish gaelic footballer
- Charles A. Beggs (1869–1939), American politician
- Gail Beggs, Canadian government official
- Jacqueline Beggs (born 1962), New Zealand entomologist and ecologist
- James M. Beggs (1926–2020), former American NASA administrator
- Joe Beggs (1910–1983), American baseball player
- John I. Beggs (1847–1925), American entrepreneur, former director of General Electric
- Lyall T. Beggs (1899–1973), American politician
- Nick Beggs (born 1961), British musician, member of Kajagoogoo
- Pam Beggs (born 1947), Australian politician
- Richard Beggs, sound designer and Academy Award winner
- Roy Beggs (born 1936), Northern Ireland politician
- Roy Beggs Jr (born 1962), Northern Ireland politician, son of Roy Beggs
- Alabama Beggs, fictional lead character in Save Me the Waltz by Zelda Fitzgerald

== See also ==
- Barbara Cass-Beggs (1904–1990), Canadian folk song collector, singer and teacher
- Beggs (disambiguation)
- Begg
