= Lakshmi Manchu =

Indian actress (born 1970)

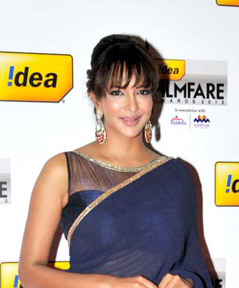
- Manchu at Filmfare Awards South, 2012
- Born: Manchu Lakshmi Prasanna; 8 October 1977 (age 48); Madras, Tamil Nadu, India
- Education: Oklahoma City University
- Occupations: Actress; Television presenter
- Spouse: London Srinivas (Andy Srinivasan (m. 2006)
- Children: 1
- Father: Mohan Babu
- Relatives: Vishnu Manchu (brother); Manchu Manoj (half brother)
- Website: lakshmimanchu.com

Manchu Lakshmi Prasanna (born 8 October 1977) is an Indian actress, film producer, and television presenter who works in Telugu cinema and worked in American television. The daughter of senior actor Mohan Babu, Manchu holds a bachelor's degree in theatre from Oklahoma City University. She has garnered two Filmfare Awards South and two Nandi Awards.

Manchu made her acting debut with the American television series Las Vegas, where she played the minor role of Sarasvati Kumar, the love interest of James Lesure. She then appeared in one episode of each of the following series: Desperate Housewives, Late Nights with my Lover, and Mystery ER. She has also appeared in commercials for Toyota, AARP, and Chevrolet.

In 2006, she directed, produced, and acted in Perfect Lives, a short film that was showcased at the Wilshire Fine Arts Theater as part of the La Femme Film Festival in Los Angeles. She made her theatre debut as Miss Trunchbull in the adaptation of Roald Dahl's Matilda, directed by Taher Ali Baig, in 2016.

== Early life and family ==
Lakshmi Manchu is the only daughter of actor Mohan Babu and Vidya Devi. She has a younger brother, Vishnu Manchu, and a younger paternal half-brother, Manoj Manchu. She was born in Chennai.

Manchu married Andy Srinivasan, an IT professional from Chennai, in 2006. The couple has a daughter born through surrogacy. They settled in Hyderabad for a few years before moving to Mumbai.

== Career ==
Having started her career at the age of 4, Manchu has been in 20 feature films in India and a few minor television roles in the U.S. She co-owns Sree Lakshmi Prasanna Pictures along with her family members, a production company that has produced fifty-six feature films to date.

In December 2011, she was signed on to portray a supporting role in Mani Ratnam's Tamil film Kadal after a successful audition. Portraying the role of Celina, a poor village woman, she expected this film to be her breakthrough but hardly got offers in Tamil after the film's release.

== Filmography ==
Key
†	Denotes films that have not yet been released

=== Film ===
==== Acting roles ====
Year	Title	Role	Language	Notes
2008	The Ode	Najma	English	
2009	Dead Air	Gabbi	English	
2009	Thank You for Washing	Phoebe	English	Short film
2010	Jhummandi Naadam	Narrator	Telugu	Guest appearance
2011	Anaganaga O Dheerudu	Irendri	Telugu	
2011	Dongala Mutha	Shiva	Telugu	
2012	Department	Satya Bhosle	Hindi	
2012	Uu Kodathara? Ulikki Padathara?	Amrutha Valli	Telugu	
2013	Kadal	Celina	Tamil	
2013	Gundello Godari	Chitra	Telugu	
2013	Doosukeltha	Herself	Telugu	Special appearance
2014	Chandamama Kathalu	Lisa Smith	Telugu	
2014	A day in the life of Lakshmi Manchu's feet	Herself	Sound	Short film
2015	Budugu	Pooja	Telugu	
2015	Dongaata	Shruti	Telugu	Also singer for "Yendiro Yendiro"
2015	Size Zero	Herself	Telugu	Special appearance
2015	Inji Iduppazhagi	Herself	Tamil	Special appearance
2016	Guntur Talkies	Herself	Telugu	Special appearance
2017	Basmati Blues	Sita	English	
2017	Lakshmi Bomb	Lakshmi & Priya	Telugu	
2018	W/O Ram	Deeksha	Telugu	
2018	Kaatrin Mozhi	Maria	Tamil	
2020	Maa Vintha Gaadha Vinuma	Herself	Telugu	Special appearance
2021	Pitta Kathalu	Swaroopakka	Telugu	Anthology film
2022	Monster	Durga / Catherine Alexandra	Malayalam	Debut Malayalam film
2024	Adiparvam	Nagulapuram Nagama	Telugu	
2025	Daksha: The Deadly Conspiracy	Daksha	Telugu	
2026	Pookie	Dr. Chithra	Tamil	
2026	Lechindi Mahila Lokam		Telugu	

==== Producer ====
Year	Title
2005	Sri
2008	Nenu Meeku Telusa?
2010	Jhummandi Naadam
2012	Uu Kodathara? Ulikki Padathara?
2013	Gundello Godari
2015	Dongaata

=== Television ===
==== Acting roles ====
Year	Title	Role	Network	Language	Notes
2004–07	Las Vegas	Sarasvati Kumar	NBC	English	Recurring role (11 episodes)
2006	Boston Legal	Juror No. 6	ABC	English	"Shock and Oww!" (season 2: episode 18)
2008	Mystery ER	Dr. Baker	Discovery Health	English	"Eating Away/A Model's Malady" (season 2: episode 5)
2008	Desperate Housewives	Nabila	ABC	English	"Kids Ain't Like Everybody Else" (season 5: episode 3)
2019	Mrs. Subbalakshmi	Mrs. Subbalakshmi	ZEE5	Telugu	
2024	Yakshini	Jwalamukhi	Disney+ Hotstar	Telugu	
2025	The Traitors	Contestant	Prime Video	Hindi	18th place

==== As a host or judge ====
Year	Title	Role	Network
2008	Lakshmi Talk Show	Host	Zee Telugu
2011	Prematho Mee Lakshmi	Host	ETV
2012	Luck Unte Lakshmi	Host	ETV
2013	Super Jodi	Judge	
2013	Doosukeltha	Host	
2016	Mee Kosam	Host	
2016–2018	Memusaitham	Host	Gemini TV
2018	Maharani	Host	Zee Telugu
2021	Aha Bhojanambu	Host	Aha

== Awards and nominations ==
Year	Award	Category	Work	Result	Ref.
2011	Filmfare Awards South	Best Supporting Actress – Telugu	Anaganaga O Dheerudu	Nominated	
2013	Filmfare Awards South	Best Supporting Actress – Telugu	Gundello Godari	Won	
2014	Filmfare Awards South	Best Supporting Actress – Telugu	Chandamama Kathalu	Won	
2011	South Indian International Movie Awards	Best Actor in a Negative Role – Telugu	Anaganaga O Dheerudu	Won	
2013	South Indian International Movie Awards	Best Supporting Actress – Telugu	Gundello Godari	Won	
2014	South Indian International Movie Awards	Best Supporting Actress – Telugu	Chandamama Kathalu	Nominated	
2015	South Indian International Movie Awards	Best Actress – Telugu	Dongaata	Nominated	
2011	Nandi Awards	Best Villain	Anaganaga O Dheerudu	Won	
2014	Nandi Awards	Best Supporting Actress	Chandamama Kathalu	Won	
2011	CineMAA Awards	Best Supporting Actress	Anaganaga O Dheerudu	Won	
2011	Santosham Film Awards	Best Villain	Anaganaga O Dheerudu	Won	
2011	Hyderabad Times Film Awards	Best Actor in a Negative Role - Female	Anaganaga O Dheerudu	Won	
2013	Oklahoma City University	Alumni Hall of Honour Award	—N/a	Won	
