= Begging (disambiguation) =

Begging is the practice of imploring others to grant a favor, often a gift of money, with little or no expectation of reciprocation.

Begging may also refer to:

== Common uses ==
- Begging in animals, when an animal solicits being given resources by another animal
- Begging the question, a logical fallacy
- Mendicant religious orders which specifically require public solicitation of support

== Arts, entertainment, and media ==
- "Begging" (song), a 2013 song by Swedish singer Anton Ewald
- "Begging", a song by Dua Lipa from Dua Lipa
- "Beggin'", a 1967 song by The Four Seasons, covered by Madcon in 2007
- Beggin', a 2023 song by Chris Lake with Aluna
- Begging for Billionaires, 2009 American documentary film directed by Philip Klein exposing abuses of eminent domain
- "Begging You", a 1995 song by The Stone Roses, released from the album Second Coming

== See also ==
- Aggressive panhandling, legal term designating those forms of public solicitation which have been designated as unlawful
- Beg (disambiguation)
