= Begg =

Begg (from Gaelic Beag: little, young, small of stature) is a Scottish and Irish surname. It may also be a variant of the surname Beg. Notable people with the surname include:

== Scottish ==
- Alexander Charles Begg (1912–1995), New Zealand radiologist and historian
- Alistair Begg (born 1952), Scottish minister in the United States
- Anne Begg (born 1955), Scottish politician
- Chris Begg (born 1979), Canadian baseball player
- Dale Begg-Smith (born 1991) Canadian-Australian skier and entrepreneur
- Ean Begg (1929–2018), Scottish army officer, esotericist and analytical psychologist
- Gordon Begg (1868–1954), British stage and film actor, active in Hollywood
- Ferdinand Begg (1847–1926), Scottish politician
- Heather Begg (1932–2009), New Zealand mezzo-soprano
- Iain Begg, British economist
- Ian Begg (bishop) (1911–1989), Scottish Episcopalian prelate
- Ian Begg, (1925–2017), Scottish architect
- Jean Begg (1886–1971), New Zealand welfare worker and feminist
- James Begg (1808–1883), Scottish minister
- James Livingstone Begg (1874–1958), Scottish geologist
- John Begg (1866–1937), British architect in India
- Konrad Begg (born 1972), Scottish film director
- Melissa Begg, American biostatistician and academic administrator
- Moazzam Begg (born 1968), British/Pakistani held by the United States as a terrorist suspect
- Neil Begg (1915–1995), New Zealand paediatrician
- Si Begg (born 1972), British disc jockey
- Varyl Begg (1908–1995), British Royal Navy Admiral of the Fleet, First Sea Lord and Chief of the Naval Staff
- Victor Begg (born 1947), Indian-born American philanthropist
- William Begg (1821–1889), Scottish merchant captain who settled in Adelaide, South Australia

== See also ==
- Beg (disambiguation)
- Beggs (disambiguation)
- Baig (surname); may be a variant of Begg.
