= SIIMA Award for Best Supporting Actress – Telugu =

Indian award for supporting actress

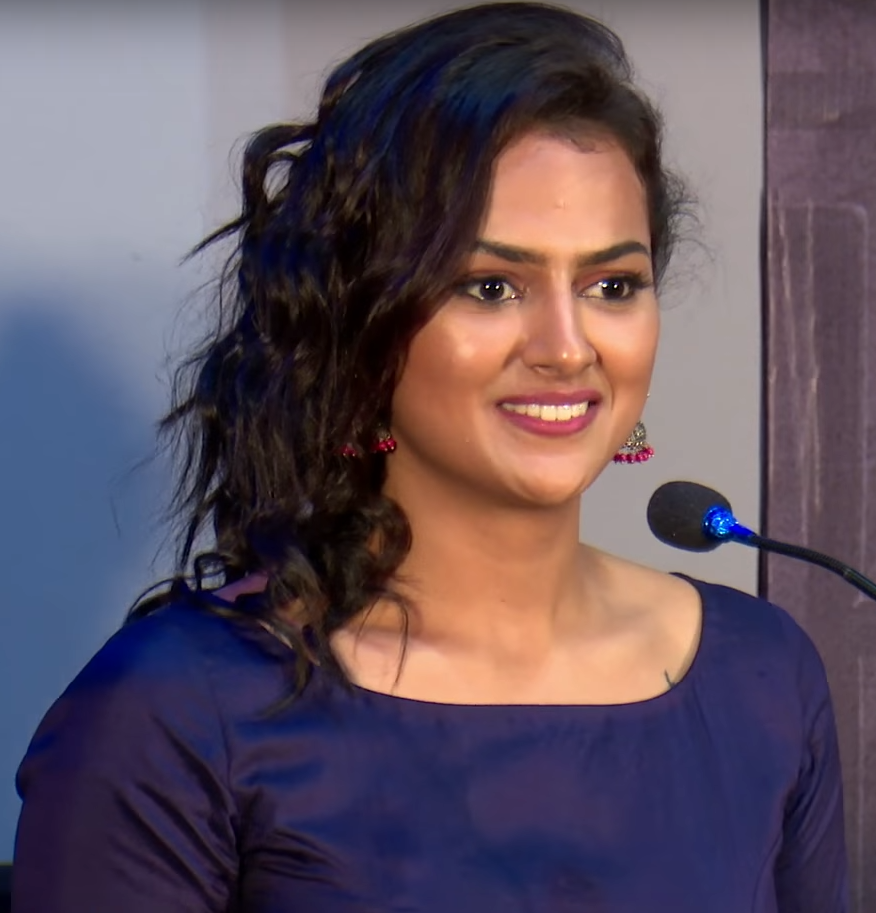
- The 2026 recipient: Shraddha Srinath
- Awarded for: Best Performance by an Actress in a Supporting Role in Telugu cinema
- Country: India
- Presented by: Vibri Media Group
- First award: 12 September 2013 (for films released in 2012)
- Most recent winner: Shraddha Srinath, Daaku Maharaaj (2025)

Highlights
- Most wins: Anasuya Bharadwaj (2)
- Most nominations: Ramya Krishna (5)

SIIMA Award for Best Supporting Actress – Telugu is presented by Vibri media group as part of its annual South Indian International Movie Awards, for the best acting done by an actress in a supporting role in Telugu films. The award was first given in 2013 for films released in 2012. Ramya Krishna is the most nominated with six nominations and Anasuya Bharadwaj is the most awarded with two wins.

== Superlatives ==
| Categories | Recipient | Record |
|---|---|---|
| Most wins | Anasuya Bharadwaj | 2 |
| Most nominations | Ramya Krishna | 6 |
| Most consecutive nominations | Ramya Krishna | 4 |
| Most nominations without a win | Jayasudha | 5 |
| Oldest winner | Lakshmi | Age 69 (9th SIIMA) |
| Youngest winner | Kiara Khanna | Age 7 (12th SIIMA) |
| Oldest nominee | Lakshmi | Age 69 (9th SIIMA) |
| Youngest nominee | Kiara Khanna | Age 7 (12th SIIMA) |

== Winners ==
| Year | Actress | Film | Ref |
|---|---|---|---|
| 2012 | Saloni Aswani | Bodyguard | |
| 2013 | Lakshmi Manchu | Gundello Godari | |
| 2014 | Shriya Saran | Manam | |
| 2015 | Ramya Krishna | Baahubali: The Beginning | |
| 2016 | Anasuya Bharadwaj | Kshanam | |
| 2017 | Bhumika Chawla | Middle Class Abbayi | |
| 2018 | Anasuya Bharadwaj | Rangasthalam | |
| 2019 | Lakshmi | Oh! Baby | |
| 2020 | Tabu | Ala Vaikunthapurramuloo | |
| 2021 | Varalaxmi Sarathkumar | Krack | |
| 2022 | Sangeetha Krish | Masooda | |
| 2023 | Kiara Khanna | Hi Nanna | |
| 2024 | Anna Ben | Kalki 2898 AD | |
| 2025 | Shraddha Srinath | Daaku Maharaaj | |

== Nominations ==
- 2012: Saloni Aswani – Bodyguard
  - Sindhu Tolani – Ishq
  - Suhasini Maniratnam – Gabbar Singh
  - Amala Akkineni – Life Is Beautiful
  - Bhanupriya – Dhammu
- 2013: Lakshmi Manchu – Gundello Godari
  - Anjali – Seethamma Vakitlo Sirimalle Chettu
  - Jayasudha – Seethamma Vakitlo Sirimalle Chettu
  - Nadhiya Moidu – Attarintiki Daredi
  - Andrea Jeremiah – Tadakha
- 2014: Shriya Saran – Manam
  - Nadhiya Moidu – Drushyam
  - Jayasudha – Yevadu
  - Sujata Kumar – Legend
  - Lakshmi Manchu – Chandamama Kathalu
- 2015: Ramya Krishna – Baahubali: The Beginning
  - Nithya Menen – Rudramadevi
  - Kriti Kharbanda – Bruce Lee - The Fighter
  - Pavitra Lokesh – Malli Malli Idi Rani Roju
  - Sneha – S/O Satyamurthy
- 2016: Anasuya – Kshanam
  - Anupama Parameswaran – Premam
  - Jayasudha – Oopiri
  - Nadiya Moidu – A Aa
  - Ramya Krishna – Soggade Chinni Nayana
- 2017: Bhoomika Chawla – Middle Class Abbayi
  - Hema Malini – Gautamiputra Satakarni
  - Jayasudha – Sathamanam Bhavati
  - Radhika Sarathkumar – Raja The Great
  - Ramya Krishna – Baahubali 2: The Conclusion
- 2018: Anasuya – Rangasthalam
  - Asha Sarath – Bhaagamathie
  - Jayasudha – Srinivasa Kalyanam
  - Ramya Krishna – Sailaja Reddy Alludu
  - Supriya – Goodachari
- 2019: Lakshmi – Oh! Baby
  - Nivetha Pethuraj – Chitralahari
  - Mirnalini Ravi – Gaddalakonda Ganesh
  - Jhansi – Mallesham
  - Ananya Agarwal – Majili
- 2020: Tabu – Ala Vaikunthapurramuloo
  - Vijayashanti – Sarileru Neekevvaru
  - Anjali – Nishabdham
  - Sargun Kaur Luthra – Aswathama
  - Gouri G. Kishan – Jaanu
- 2021: Varalaxmi Sarathkumar – Krack
  - Ramya Krishna – Republic
  - Nivetha Thomas – Vakeel Saab
  - Poorna – Akhanda
  - Nivetha Pethuraj – Red
- 2022: Sangeetha Krish – Masooda
  - Amala Akkineni – Oke Oka Jeevitham
  - Priyamani – Virata Parvam
  - Samyuktha Menon – Bheemla Nayak
  - Sobhita Dhulipala – Major
- 2023: Kiara Khanna – Hi Nanna
  - Rohini – Writer Padmabhushan
  - Shreya Navile – Month of Madhu
  - Soniya Singh – Virupaksha
  - Sriya Reddy – Salaar: Part 1 – Ceasefire
  - Varalaxmi Sarathkumar – Veera Simha Reddy
- 2024: Anna Ben – Kalki 2898 AD
  - Pavani Karanam – Pushpa 2: The Rule
  - Ramya Krishna – Guntur Kaaram
  - Sharanya Pradeep – Ambajipeta Marriage Band
  - Varalaxmi Sarathkumar – Hanu-Man
- 2025: Shraddha Srinath – Daaku Maharaaj
  - Anu Emmanuel – The Girlfriend
  - Komalee Prasad – HIT: The Third Case
  - Sriya Reddy – They Call Him OG
  - Shriya Saran – Mirai

== See also ==
- SIIMA Award for Best Supporting Actor – Telugu
