= Aziz Royesh =

Afghan social activist, teacher and writer (born 1969)

- عزیز رویش
- Born: 1969 (age 56–57); Kabul, Kingdom of Afghanistan
- Education: Elementary formal schooling; titular diplomas
- Occupations: Teacher, social activist, writer
- Political party: Enlightenment Movement
- Awards: Yale World Fellows Program 2010 and National Endowment For Democracy (NED) 2011

Azizullah Royesh (known as Aziz Royesh, Dari: عزیز رویش) is a Hazara, social activist, teacher and writer from Afghanistan.

== Biography ==
Aziz Royesh was born in 1969 in Fazel Baig, Kabul, Afghanistan. After leaving school at age 10, he travelled to Ghazni Province before moving to Quetta, Pakistan alone at age 11. Because Royesh had no family in Quetta, he worked in tailor shops, bakeries, and small factories to support himself. Unable to continue his formal education, he continued to study what he could on his own outside his work.

At the age of 16, he returned to Afghanistan and established five schools in Ghazni province. With the reemergence of the Taliban in 1994, he returned to Pakistan and established the Marefat High School for Afghan Refugees in Pakistan. After the fall of the Taliban in 2001, Marefat High School was transferred to Kabul's Dashte Barchi while a branch in Pakistan remained open.

The Marefat School and Royesh are subjects of a non-fiction work, "The Last Thousand: One School's Promise in a Nation at War" (2016) by American writer Jeffrey E. Stern.

== Best Teacher in the World ==
In 2015 he was nominated the Best Teacher of the Year in the world.

== Publications ==
- A book in Dari language, Dari: "بگذار نفس بکشم"

== See also ==
- List of Hazara people
