= Beg =

Beg is the verb form of begging.

Beg or BEG may also refer to:

== People ==
- Beg (surname)
- Beg Ferati (born 1986), Swiss footballer

== Arts and entertainment ==
- Beg (1970 film), a Soviet film
- "Beg" (song), a 2019 song from Omer by Omer Adam and Netta
- "Beg", a 1997 song from All Saints by All Saints
- "Beg", a 2001 song from Every Six Seconds, by Saliva
- "Beg", a 2006 song from The Melody and the Energetic Nature of Volume by Evans Blue
- "Beg", a 2012 song from Armageddon by Guy Sebastian
- "Beg", a 2014 song from The Chairman by M.I
- "Beg", a 2017 song by Jack & Jack
- "Beg", a 2020 song from Si Vis Pacem, Para Bellum by Seether

== Transportation ==
- BEG, IATA code for Belgrade Nikola Tesla Airport in Serbia
- Bayerische Eisenbahngesellschaft, the state rail transport authority for Bavaria
- Belgrave railway station, Melbourne

== Other uses ==
- Bey, also spelled Beg, a Turkic title
- Beg (dinosaur), a dinosaur genus
- Bengal Engineer Group or Bombay Engineer Group, regiments of the Corps of Engineers of the Indian Army
- Brown Eyed Girls, a South Korean girl group

== See also ==
- Baig (surname)
- Begg, a surname
- Beg Khan, a combination of Beg and Khan titles
