= Ramya NSK =

Indian singer

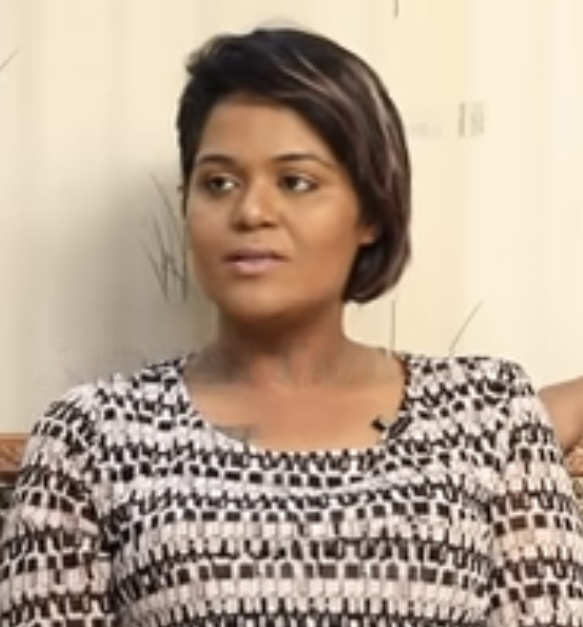
- Ramya in 2019

Background information
- Also known as: Ramya NSK
- Born: Ramya; Chennai, Tamil Nadu, India
- Genres: Carnatic, Western classic
- Occupation: Playback singer
- Years active: 2006–2024
- Spouse: Sathya SK (m. 2019)

Ramya NSK is an Indian playback singer, who has predominantly sung for Tamil, Telugu and Kannada films. Apart from her work as a singer, she participated as a contestant in Bigg Boss 2. She is the granddaughter of comedian N. S. Krishnan and actress T. A. Mathuram.

== Career ==
Ramya graduated in Visual Communication from Women's Christian College and later joined the radio station, Radio City. She was posted in Chennai where she worked for the firm as a music manager for five years. Along with Carnatic music, she trained in contemporary style music with the Emmanuel Methodist Church choir for a period of eight years. She also acted in the movie Tharai Thappattai.

Having sung over 400 songs for Indian films, Ramya is best known for the song "Satru Munbu" from Gautham Vasudev Menon's Neethaane En Ponvasantham, which had music composed by Ilaiyaraaja. For the song, she received the Best Female Playback Singer award for Tamil cinema during the Filmfare Awards ceremony in 2013. She later also won a similar prize at the Vijay Awards during the same year.

In 2018, Ramya appeared on the Tamil reality television show, Bigg Boss, hosted by Kamal Haasan. She stated that she was keen to experience the opportunity to understand what a "luxurious jail" may be like. She was evicted early in the process After her eviction, Kamal Haasan suggested her "boring" character may have worked against her in the show but would help her in real life.

== Personal life ==
In 2017, Ramya married Arjun, but they divorced later that year.

In September 2019, Ramya married serial actor Sathya, and she gave birth to a baby boy in July 2020.

== Discography ==
=== Tamil ===
Year	Film	Song	Music director	Co-singer(s)
2008	Pandhayam	"Lusimbara"	Vijay Antony	Vijay Antony, Christopher
2008	Oru Ponnu Oru Paiyan	"Yaanai Pasi"	Karthik Raja	Vijay Yesudas
2008	Kadhalil Vizhundhen	"Unakenna Naan"	P. V. Prasath	Vijay Antony
2008	Durai	"Adi Aathi"	D. Imman	Jassie Gift, Timmy
2009	Vettaikaaran	"Karikaalan Rap"	Vijay Antony	Suchith Suresan, Sangeetha Rajeshwaran
2009	Ninaithale Inikkum	"Sexy Lady"	Vijay Antony	MK Balaji, Sheba, Maya
2009	Irumbukottai Murattusingam	"Vellaikaari Nee"	G. V. Prakash Kumar	MK Balaji, Bhargavi
2009	A Aa E Ee	"Dingi Tappu"	Vijay Antony	Megha, Sheba, Vinaya, Maya, Vijay Antony
2010	Vandae Maatharam	"One Two Three"	D. Imman	Farazuddin, D. Imman
2010	Nagaram	"Theme Of Love"	Thaman	
2010	Naanayam	"Aasa Aasa"	James Vasanthan	Kannan, Megha, Sheba
2011	Yuvan Yuvathi	"Un Kannai Paartha Piragu"	Vijay Antony	Karthik
2011	Mouna Guru	"Enna Idhu"	Thaman	Ranjith, Rahul Nambiar, Rita
2011	Aanmai Thavarael	"Kadhal Adimazhai Kaalam"	Mariya Manohar	Krish
2012	Neethaane En Ponvasantham	"Sattru Munbu"	Ilaiyaraaja	
2012	Neethaane En Ponvasantham	"Saayndhu Saayndhu"	Ilaiyaraaja	Yuvan Shankar Raja
2013	Udhayam NH4	"Indrodu Thadaigal"	G. V. Prakash Kumar	Srinivas
2013	Sillunu Oru Sandhippu	"Bul Bul Thara"	F.S.Faizal	Sam P. Keerthan
2013	Ponmaalai Pozhudhu	"Masala Chicks"	C.Sathya	
2013	Maranthen Mannithen	"En Ooru"	Ilaiyaraaja	
2013	Hi Da	"Janavary Mazhaiyil"	Vishal Chandrasekhar	
2013	Biriyani	"Pom Pom Penne"	Yuvan Shankar Raja	Rahul Nambiar
2013	Arrambam	"En Fuse Pochu"	Yuvan Shankar Raja	Karthik
2014	Yaan	"Nee Vandhu Ponadhu"	Harris Jayaraj	KK, Bombay Jayashree, Megha
2014	Vaaraayo Vennilaave	"Intha Iyelesa"	Karthik Raja	
2014	Un Samayal Arayil	"Therindho Theriyaamalo"	Ilaiyaraaja	Karthik
2014	Megha	"Kalvane"	Ilaiyaraaja	Haricharan
2014	Megha	"Mugilo"	Ilaiyaraaja	Karthik
2014	Megha	"Chellam Konjum"	Ilaiyaraaja	Karthik
2014	Manam Nilluna Nikkadhe	"Nenjodu Neeye"	RG Allen	
2014	JK Enum Nanbanin Vaazhkai	"Uyire Uyire"	G. V. Prakash Kumar	Benny Dayal
2014	JK Enum Nanbanin Vaazhkai	"Get Ready For My Mojo"	G. V. Prakash Kumar	Vijay Prakash
2014	Inga Enna Solluthu	"Ennodu"	Dharan	Naresh Iyer
2014	Inga Enna Solluthu	"Avan Ivan"	Dharan	
2014	Anegan	"YOLO - You Only Live Once"	Harris Jayaraj	Shail Hada, Richard, MC Vickey, Eden
2014	Amara	"Ennenamo Nadakudhe"	D. Imman	Haricharan
2014	Aindhaam Thalaimurai Sidha Vaidhiya Sigamani	"En Anbe"	Simon	Vijay Prakash
2015	Touring Talkies	"Chakkan Chakka Chakkan"	Ilaiyaraaja	
2015	Snehavin Kadhalarkal	"Sevvaname"	R.Prabahar	
2015	Sagaptham	"Vaada Vaada"	Karthik Raja	Senthil Dass
2015	Purampokku Engira Podhuvudamai	"Dhegam Thaakum"	Varshan	K. Krishna Kumar
2015	Maanga	"Sriranjini"	Premgi Amaran	Premgi Amaren, T. L. Maharajan, Hemambika
2015	Kathai Thiraikathai Vasanam Iyakkam	"A For Azhagirukku"	Vijay Antony	
2015	Inji Iduppazhagi	"Size Sexy"	M. M. Keeravani	
2015	En Vazhi Thani Vazhi	"Harmonic Thee"	Srikanth Deva	
2015	Andhadhi	"Mazhai Azhaga"	Shamanth	
2015	1 Pandhu 4 Run 1 Wicket	"Un Tholil"	Umesh	
2016	Vizhithiru	"Vellai Irave"	Sathyan Mahalingam	G. V. Prakash Kumar
2016	Oyee	"Eden Garden"	Ilaiyaraaja	Ranjith, Premjith
2016	Narathan	"Mayakara Manmadha"	Mani Sharma	Karthik
2016	Oru Melliya Kodu	"Oru Melliya Kodu"	Ilaiyaraaja	Karthik
2016	Amma Kanakku	"Unakkum Enakkum"	Ilaiyaraaja	Vandana Srinivasan
2016	Iru Mugan	"Oh Maya"	Harris Jayaraj	N. C. Karunya
2017	Gemini Ganeshanum Suruli Raajanum	"Vennila Thangachi"	D. Imman	Nakash Aziz
2017	Singam 3	"Mudhal Murai"	Harris Jayaraj	
2020	Varmaa	"Aazhiyin Nadhiye"	Radhan	
2020	Plan Panni Pannanum	"Ennodu Va"	Yuvan Shankar Raja	Rajaganapathy

=== Telugu ===
Year	Film	Song	Music director
2009	Super Cowboy	"Thulle Dorasani"	G.V. Prakash
2009	Super Cowboy	"Rajasimham"	G.V. Prakash
2009	NH4 (Dubbed version)	"Nedika Manaku"	G.V. Prakash
2010	Ragada	"Okkadante"	Thaman
2011	Veera	"Ekkadekkada"	Thaman
2011	LBW: Life Before Wedding	"Teerale Vadhante"	Anil
2011	Life Before Wedding:LBW	"Hey Ento"	Anil
2011	Dookudu	"Poovai Poovai"	Thaman
2011	Dookudu	"Nee Dookudu"	Thaman
2012	Yeto Vellipoyindhi Manasu	"Yedhi Yedhi"	Ilaiyaraja
2012	Yeto Vellipoyindhi Manasu	"Inthakaalam"	Ilaiyaraja
2012	Mr.7	"Boostu Thaage"	Munna Kasi
2012	Body Guard	"Body Guard - Title Track"	Thaman
2013	Shadow	"Gola Gola"	Thaman
2013	Om 3D	"Cheliya"	Achu Rajamani
2013	Gundello Godari	"Aa Eedhi Kurrodu"	Ilaiyaraja
2013	Chandee	"A Apple La"	Chinna/ N.R.Shankar
2013	Biriyani (Dubbed version)	"Pam Pam Pam"	Yuvan Shankar Raja
2013	Aata Arrambam (Dubbed version)	"Manasivvaka Maanukolevu"	Yuvan Shankar Raja
2013	Aadu Magaadra Bujji	"Oosi Nee Andalu"	Sri Kommineni
2013	555	"Rowdy Girls"	Simon
2013	555	"Prema Anna Vinthaloni"	Simon
2014	Ulavacharu Biriyani	"Thelisi Theliyendhila"	Ilaiyaraja
2014	Nene	"Ninninka Chudavu"	Harris Jayaraj
2014	Anekudu (Dubbed version)	"Yolo"	Harris Jayaraj
2015	Bandipotu	"Petromaxu Lightingu"	Kalyan Koduri
2016	Abbayitho Ammayi	"Saradaale"	Ilaiyaraja
2019	Mr. Majnu	"Mr. Majnu" (title track)	S. Thaman

=== Kannada ===
Year	Film	Song	Music director
2012	Anna Bond	"Anna Bond - Title Track"	V. Harikrishna
2013	Whistle	"Pala Pala"	Joshua Sridhar
2013	Whistle	"Oora Mandhi - Remix"	Joshua Sridhar
2013	Whistle	"Oora Mandhi"	Joshua Sridhar
2014	Oggarane	"Manadi Belagayithe"	Ilaiyaraja
2016	Viraat	"Ivanobba Olle Uduga"	V. Harikrishna
2016	Shivalinga	"Betagaara Nobba"	V. Harikrishna
2016	Game	"Ondhu Manjina Bindhu"	Illayaraja

=== Malayalam ===
Year	Film	Song	Music director
2006	Notebook	"As We All Know"	Mejo Joseph
2009	Dasavatharam (Dubbed version)	"Ka Karuppa"	Himesh Reshammiya
2010	Vande Mataram	"One Two Three"	D Imman

=== English ===
- Love & Love Only (2015)

=== Television ===
- Bigg Boss Tamil 2 – Evicted Day 35
- Mr and Mrs Chinnathirai Season 2 – Top 7
- BB Jodigal
