= Beggs =

Beggs may refer to:

== People ==
- Beggs (surname)

== Places in the United States ==
- Beggs, Oklahoma, a city
- Fort Beggs, a frontier fort in Illinois, during the Black Hawk War of 1832
- Beggs Building, a building in Columbus, Ohio

== See also ==
- Begg
