= Beg (surname) =

Beg is a title and honorific derived from the Turkish title "bey". Names of many people traditionally include this honorific, such as Ulugh Beg. In modern times it also serves as a surname. Notable people with the surname include:

- Arif Beg (1935–2016), Indian politician
- Azad Beg (born 1952), Turkish politician
- Farhat N. Beg, American physicist
- Manzoor Alam Beg (1931–1998), Bangladeshi photographer
- M. A. B. Beg (1934–1990), Pakistani theoretical physicist
- Mirza Afzal Beg
- Mirza Aslam Beg (born 1931), Pakistani general
- Mirza Hameedullah Beg
- Mirza Mehboob Beg (born 1949), Indian politician
- Mohammad Saleem Beg, Indian art conservator, historian and columnist
- Muazzam Beg (born 1978), Indian Bollywood film writer and director
- Zahid Beg, Indian politician

== See also ==
- Baig (surname)
- Begg
