= Neethaane En Ponvasantham (soundtrack) =

- Album cover

Soundtrack album by Ilaiyaraaja
- Released: 1 September 2012
- Recorded: 2011–2012
- Genre: Feature film soundtrack
- Length: 42:00
- Language: Tamil
- Label: Sony Music India
- Producer: Ilaiyaraaja

Ilaiyaraaja chronology
| Mayilu (2012) | Neethaane En Ponvasantham (2012) | Yeto Vellipoyindhi Manasu (2012) |

Neethaane En Ponvasantham is the soundtrack album, composed by Ilaiyaraaja, to the Indian romance film of the same name, directed by Gautham Vasudev Menon that stars Jiiva and Samantha. The album features eight tracks, with lyrics penned by Na. Muthukumar. The album was one of the most anticipated musicals of 2012 in Tamil cinema. The production house sold the musical rights at an altitudinous price of ₹20 million (US$210,000), setting a record price for audio rights acquirement which were sold to Sony Music India. It was released during a live concert on 1 September 2012. The film's Telugu version, Yeto Vellipoyindhi Manasu, also directed by Gautham Menon, reuses the same soundtrack.

== Development ==
Menon approached Ilaiyaraaja to compose music for the film. The film marked the first-time collaboration of Menon and Ilaiyaraaja. Menon further clarified that he had decided to rope in Ilaiyaraaja for Neethaane En Ponvasantham, while working on the scriptment of the film already. 7 singers have lent their voices for the songs, including composer Ilaiyaraaja, Karthik, Raaja's son Yuvan Shankar Raja, N. S. Krishnan's grand daughter Ramya NSK, Suraj Jagan, Sunidhi Chauhan and Bela Shende.

Ilaiyaaraja instantaneously composed the songs on harmonium with the singers in Chennai. In London, the rest of the recording with the background score was completed at Angel Recording Studios for which Anglo-Indian Music Productions was hired, providing singers, a 108-piece orchestra and percussion. The 108-piece live symphony orchestral music was revealed to be the opening part of a song. A children's choir was also used as backing vocals in a song. Reports surfaced that the leading pair had lent their voices for the title track in the film, but the lead actress denied the rumour. Karthik stated that he had sung two songs for the film and the respective Telugu version as well. All lyrics were penned by Na. Muthukumar, replacing Menon's usual associate lyricist Thamarai for the first time.

The production house sold the musical rights at an altitudinous price of ₹20 million (US$210,000), setting a record price of audio rights acquirement which were sold to Sony Music India.

== Marketing ==
A short audio trailer featuring the instrumental part of a song with visuals depicting the director, the choir, the artistes and the music director during the recording sessions at Angel Recording Studios, London was released over the internet on 11 May 2012. On 2 June 2012, coinciding with Ilaiyaraaja's 69th birthday, a short audio teaser of the song "Sayndhu Sayndhu Nee Paarkum Podhu" sung by Yuvan Shankar Raja was released over YouTube that received over fifty thousand playbacks in two days. Nearly half-minute video teaser of the song was released online on 22 July 2012 by Sony Music South via YouTube, sharing then through their official social networking pages. On 14 August 2012 a forty second teaser preview of the song "Ennoda Vaa Vaa" crooned by singer Karthik was released on YouTube that garnered one lakh views in less than 48 hours.

== Release ==
The album was released in a grand manner on 1 September 2012 at the Jawaharlal Nehru Indoor Stadium, Chennai. Over one lakh audio CDs were booked in advance, prior to the audio launch. Several noted film personalities were present at the event; directors K. Balachandar, Bharathiraja, Balu Mahendra, P. Vasu, Suresh Krishna, Venkat Prabhu, Samuthirakani and R. Sundarrajan, Ilaiyaraaja's sons and composers, Yuvan Shankar Raja and Karthik Raja, actors Suriya, Karthi, Jayam Ravi and Premji Amaren apart from the lead cast were among the attendees. Gautham Menon hosted the event. The function featured a documentary on the composers, followed by instrumental renditions of some of Ilaiyaraaja's most popular compositions performed by a local orchestra. Selected songs from the soundtrack were first introduced by the main cast, director and actor Suriya and were later continued as stage performance by the respective singers. The songs from the album were performed by Anglo-Indian Music Productions orchestra and the Hungarian National Philharmonic that was earlier chosen to work on the background score. The audio launch function was telecast on 16 September 2012, 1430 hrs IST on Jaya TV. Parts of "Ennodu Va Va" were shown while singer Karthik was giving a live performance of the song.

== Track listing ==
All lyrics are written by Na. Muthukumar; all music is composed by Ilaiyaraaja.

| No. | Title | Artist(s) | Length |
|---|---|---|---|
| 1. | "Kaatrai Konjam" | Karthik | 5:34 |
| 2. | "Pudikale Maamu" | Suraj Jagan, Karthik | 6:00 |
| 3. | "Yennodu Vaa Va" | Karthik | 4:19 |
| 4. | "Saayndhu Saayndhu" | Yuvan Shankar Raja, Ramya NSK | 6:07 |
| 5. | "Pengal Yendral" | Yuvan Shankar Raja | 4:06 |
| 6. | "Mudhal Murai" | Sunidhi Chauhan | 3:55 |
| 7. | "Sattru Munbu" | Ramya NSK | 5:57 |
| 8. | "Vaanam Mella" | Ilaiyaraaja, Bela Shende | 6:02 |
| Total length: | | | 42:00 |

== Reception ==
The soundtrack received positive reviews from music critics. Sri Krishna of Musicperk quoted, "A great musical from Raja after a long time. All hail the Maestro." Karthik Srinivasan of Milliblog called the soundtrack "every Raja fan's wet dream". Music Aloud's review said – "A musical extravaganza was promised, and a musical extravaganza has been delivered." Critic based at Indo-Asian News Service quoted the album as a "perfect rendition of melody, trance" and said "You couldn't have asked for a better album. Pick up this album and get drenched in the musical shower". Chris M. Slawecki of All About Jazz said that the album "presents surprisingly mainstream music" where "Every tune has vocals, and while several tunes present light and floating orchestration that's curiously jazz-like, these vocals often bring them back to earth".

== Accolades ==
| Award | Date of ceremony (Note: Date is linked to the article about the awards held that year, wherever possible.) | Category | Recipient(s) and nominee(s) | Result | Ref. |
|---|---|---|---|---|---|
| The Chennai Times Film Awards | 4 November 2013 | Best Music Director | Ilaiyaraaja | Nominated | |
| The Chennai Times Film Awards | 4 November 2013 | Best Lyrics | Na. Muthukumar for "Ennodu Vaa Vaa" | Nominated | |
| The Chennai Times Film Awards | 4 November 2013 | Best Singer – Male | Karthik for "Ennodu Vaa Vaa" | Nominated | |
| The Chennai Times Film Awards | 4 November 2013 | Best Singer – Female | Ramya NSK for "Sattru Munbu" | Won | |
| Filmfare Awards South | 20 July 2013 | Best Music Director – Tamil | Ilaiyaraaja | Nominated | |
| Filmfare Awards South | 20 July 2013 | Best Lyricist – Tamil | Na. Muthukumar for "Kaatrai Konjam" | Nominated | |
| Filmfare Awards South | 20 July 2013 | Best Male Playback Singer – Tamil | Karthik for "Kaatrai Konjam" | Nominated | |
| Filmfare Awards South | 20 July 2013 | Best Female Playback Singer – Tamil | Ramya NSK for "Sattru Munbu" | Won | |
| Mirchi Music Awards South | 26 August 2013 | Song of the Year | "Saayndhu Saayndhu" | Nominated | |
| Mirchi Music Awards South | 26 August 2013 | Album of the Year | Neethaane En Ponvasantham | Nominated | |
| Mirchi Music Awards South | 26 August 2013 | Male Vocalist of the Year | Karthik for "Kaatrai Konjam" | Won | |
| Mirchi Music Awards South | 26 August 2013 | Female Vocalist of the Year | Ramya NSK for "Sattru Munbu" | Nominated | |
| Mirchi Music Awards South | 26 August 2013 | Music Composer of the Year | Ilaiyaraaja for "Saayndhu Saayndhu" | Nominated | |
| Mirchi Music Awards South | 26 August 2013 | Lyricist of the Year | Na. Muthukumar for "Mudhal Murai" | Nominated | |
| Mirchi Music Awards South | 26 August 2013 | Upcoming Female Vocalist of the Year | Ramya NSK for "Sattru Munbu" | Nominated | |
| South Indian International Movie Awards | 12–13 September 2013 | Best Music Director – Tamil | Ilaiyaraaja | Nominated | |
| Vijay Awards | 11 May 2013 | Best Music Director | Ilaiyaraaja | Nominated | |
| Vijay Awards | 11 May 2013 | Best Female Playback Singer | Ramya NSK for "Sattru Munbu" | Won | |
| Vijay Awards | 11 May 2013 | Best Female Playback Singer | Sunidhi Chauhan for "Mudhal Murai" | Nominated | |
| Vijay Awards | 11 May 2013 | Best Dialogue | Gautham Vasudev Menon | Nominated | |
