= Parasuram (2002 film) =

Indian action drama film

- DVD cover
- Directed by: Mohan Gandhi
- Written by: Krishneswara Rao (dialogues)
- Screenplay by: Mohan Gandhi
- Produced by: Priyanka
- Starring: Srihari; Sanghavi
- Cinematography: B. Lokeshwara Rao
- Music by: M. M. Srilekha
- Production company: Priyanka Cinema
- Release date: 7 March 2002
- Country: India
- Language: Telugu

Parasuram is a 2002 Indian Telugu-language action drama film directed by Mohan Gandhi and starring Srihari and Sanghavi. The film was released to negative reviews from critics who felt that Srihari's acting could not save the film.

== Cast ==
- Srihari as Parasuram
- Sanghavi as Vyjayanti
- Nutan Prasad as Chandrakanth
- Sharat Saxena as Bulli Ramaiah "BR"
- Jaya Prakash Reddy as Mental Anjaneyulu
- Raja Ravindra as Subhash
- Pavani as Ramya
- Brahmanandam as a mentally challenged patient
- Giri Babu
- M. S. Narayana
- G. V. Lakshmayya Chowdhary

== Release and reception ==
Srihari visited Satyam theatre, Hyderabad on 7 March 2007 to inquire about the film's reception.

Jeevi from Idlebrain.com rated the film three out of five and wrote that "A must see for Sri Hari fans. Other people too can watch this film as time pass if they have nothing else to do". Gudipoodi Srihari of The Hindu wrote that "It is a routine theme witnessed in different formats. It is Srihari's film, with none having much display histrionically".

A critic from Full Hyderabad wrote that "Anyway, it's worth the twenty bucks you spend. I'd rather kill time than myself". A critic from Andhra Today wrote that "Bereft of novelty, this movie gives one a feeling of watching an earlier movie of Srihari. His hardwork in such fare might not add any feathers to his plume".
