= Praveen Sattaru =

Indian film director

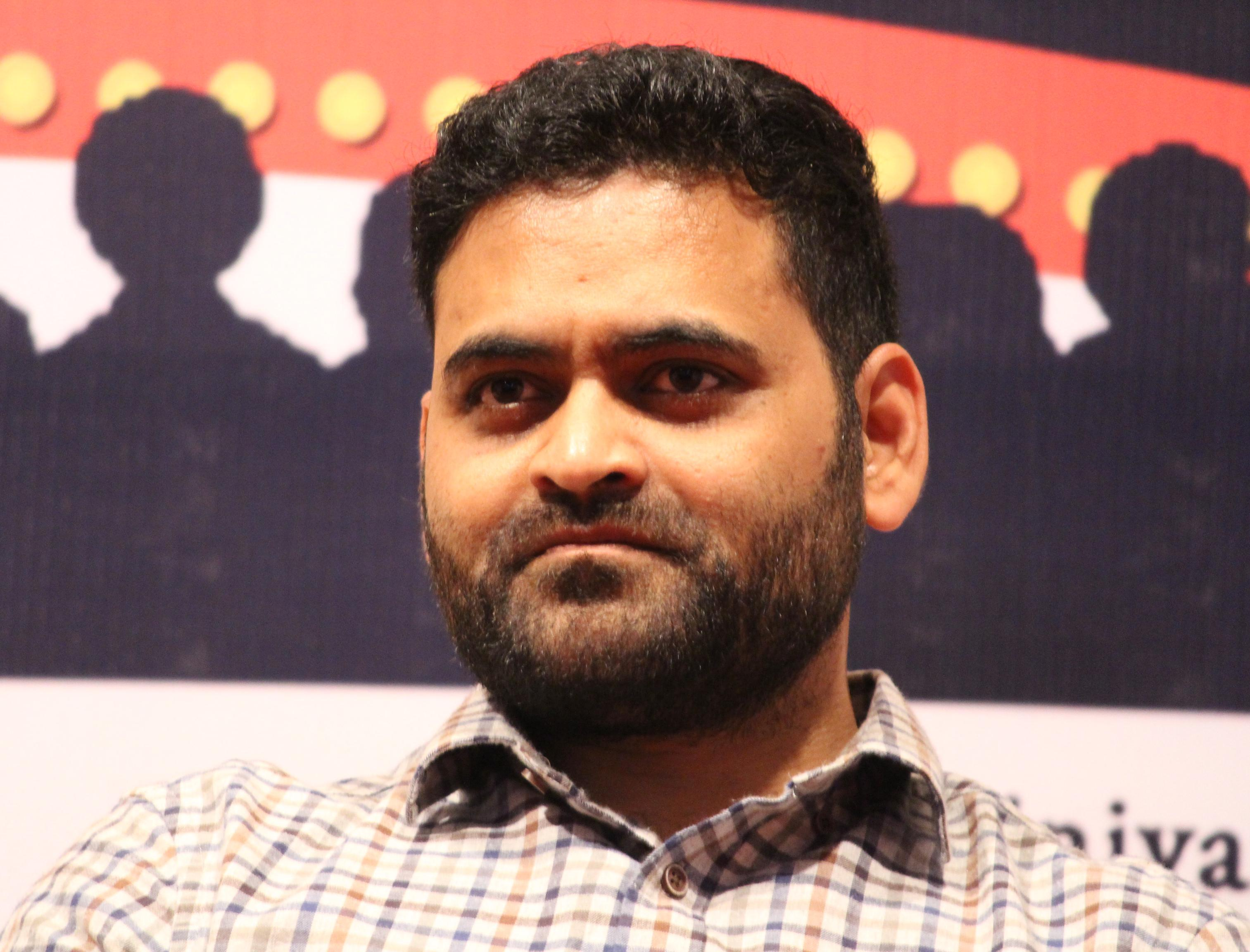
- 2017
- Born: Vizianagaram, Andhra Pradesh, India
- Occupations: Film director; screenwriter
- Years active: 2010–present
- Spouse: Archana

Praveen Sattaru (14 July) is an Indo-American film director, screenwriter and producer, known for his works in Telugu cinema. He made his directorial debut with the 2011 film, LBW: Life Before Wedding. In 2014, he directed the critically acclaimed anthology film, Chandamama Kathalu which won the National Film Award for Best Feature Film in Telugu for that year.

== Personal life ==
Praveen Sattaru was born in Vizianagaram, Andhra Pradesh, India. He holds MS degree in Chip Designing, and has worked as SAP consultant in IBM for about 10 years. He is an Indian immigrant to the United States. He is married to Archana.

== Filmography ==
Key
†	Denotes films that have not yet been released

Year	Film	Director	Producer	Writer	Notes
2011	LBW: Life Before Wedding	Yes	Yes	Yes	Debut Film
2012	Routine Love Story	Yes	Yes	Yes	
2014	Chandamama Kathalu	Yes	Yes	Yes	
2016	Guntur Talkies	Yes	No	Yes	
2017	PSV Garuda Vega	Yes	No	Yes	
2021	11th Hour	Yes	No	No	Web Series
2022	The Ghost	Yes	No	Yes	
2023	Gandeevadhari Arjuna	Yes	No	Yes	

== Awards ==
- National Film Award for Best Feature Film in Telugu – Chandamama Kathalu – 2015
