= Krishneswara Rao =

Indian Telugu film actor and writer (1955-2026)

- Born: Yellapragada Sowbhagya Krishneswara Rao; August 4, 1955; Guntur district, Andhra Pradesh, India
- Died: August 11, 2026 (aged 71)
- Occupations: Actor; writer
- Spouse: Saraswati

Yellapragada Sowbhagya Krishneswara Rao (August 4, 1955 – August 11, 2026) was an Indian actor and writer who worked in Telugu films. He played the role of a beggar in the film Chandamama Kathalu (2014), for which he received Nandi Special Jury Award. Rao acted in more than 1500 stage plays in addition to writing several of them.

== Life and career ==
Rao started as an artist during his school days. His first play was Vapas. Later he made his mark in theater. He also lost opportunities working for films because of his dedication to theater. After watching his play Roju Chastunna Manishi (The man who is dying daily), film actor M. Prabhakar Reddy invited him to write dialogues for a film Prachanda Bharatam. Later he worked for films like Ankuram, Bhadrachalam, Sri Ramulayya, Jayam Manadera.

He was a good friend of actor Jeeva. When Jeeva was acting in Avunu Valliddaru Ista Paddaru!, he met director of that film Vamsy who promised him a role in his next picture. Later he got a role in Vamsy's Konchem Touchlo Vunte Cheputanu.

Rao died on 11 August 2026.

== Filmography ==
=== As a writer ===
- Sri Ramulayya (1998) (story)
- Jayam Manadera (2000) (story)
- Bhadrachalam (2001) (story)
- Parasuram (2002) (dialogues)
- Nenu Saitham (2004) (lyrics)

=== As an actor ===
- Konchem Touchlo Vunte Cheputanu (2004)
- Devarakonda Veeraiah (2008)
- Gopi Gopika Godavari (2009)
- Veera Telangana (2010)
- Saradaga Kasepu (2010)
- Chandamama Kathalu (2014)
- Vennello Hai Hai (2016)
- Vasham (2017)
- Agent Sai Srinivasa Athreya (2019)
- Naandhi (2021)
- Virupaksha (2023)
