= Yeto Vellipoyindhi Manasu =

- Movie Poster
- Directed by: Gautham Vasudev Menon
- Screenplay by: Reshma Ghatala; Gautham Vasudev Menon
- Story by: Reshma Ghatala
- Produced by: Gautham Vasudev Menon; Reshma Gatala; Venkat Somasundaram; C. Kalyan; C. V. Rao
- Starring: Nani; Samantha
- Cinematography: M. S. Prabhu; Om Prakash; S. R. Kathir
- Edited by: Anthony Gonsalvez
- Music by: Ilaiyaraaja
- Production companies: Photon Kathaas; Teja Cinema
- Distributed by: iDream Media (overseas); Rao-San Film Distributors (Nizam)
- Release date: 14 December 2012
- Country: India
- Language: Telugu
- Box office: ₹8.5 crore distributors' share

Yeto Vellipoyindhi Manasu (transl. My heart's gone somewhere) is a 2012 Indian Telugu-language musical romance film co-written, co-produced and directed by Gautham Vasudev Menon. It stars Nani and Samantha. The film features score and soundtrack composed by Ilaiyaraaja and cinematography by M. S. Prabhu. It was simultaneously shot in Tamil as Neethaane En Ponvasantham with Jiiva replacing Nani. The film received five Nandi Awards and was successful at the box office.

== Plot ==
The film begins with Varun (Nani) gaining admission to an engineering college. He and his friends one day participate in a cultural programme, where Varun finds his childhood sweetheart Nithya (Samantha) participating in a dance show. He begins wooing her by singing on stage and later meeting her. As they meet, the film rewinds to their early days when both were in third standard. They become good friends after a small incident and their friendship blossoms. But due to a misunderstanding, Nithya decides not to meet Varun and to never talk with him. However, as destiny would have it, they meet again in their tenth standard. Nithya initially hesitates to talk with Varun, but sheds her inhibitions once Varun breaks the ice between them, and resumes her friendship with him. Nithya is elected as the pupil leader in school and as a pupil leader she is in constant interaction with Deepak, another pupil leader and her classmate, much to the dismay of Varun. As a result, they have another fallout.

The film moves to their current meeting in the college. Both forget their past misgivings and become friends again. This time, they fall in love. During the vacations, Nithya leaves India and Varun is left for himself. Varun's elder brother, who works in a software company, wants to marry his colleague and confesses the same to his parents. His parents oblige by offering to negotiate with the girl's parents. However, his parents are humiliated at the negotiations. Varun, in the process of consoling them, realises that despite their embarrassment, his brother and parents care about him rather than themselves. He then decides to take his studies more seriously and begins preparing for CAT. Nithya comes back to India and sees Varun not spending enough time with her due to his busy schedule. Nithya too initially understands his situation. However, when she learns that Varun is going to IIM Kozhikode, she too proposes to go with him. Varun rejects her proposal citing that he is going to stay in a hostel as staying in a rented house would be too costly for his family. This leads to a heated argument between the two and they break up again.

After graduating from IIM and landing a job, Varun goes about finding Nithya. He goes to Manapad in Tamil Nadu where Nithya is working as a school teacher at a tsunami relief camp. Nithya refuses to talk to him even after many attempts by Varun to start a conversation. When he finally gets her to talk, she rejects his advances saying that she is happy with her current position. Disgusted at her rejection, Varun leaves the place. After some days, Nithya invites Varun to her sister's marriage. At the same time, Varun also invites Nithya to his engagement. Nithya, shocked and surprised at this sudden development realizes that she couldn't fully understand Varun and breaks down before her sister. However, to the surprise of Varun, she attends his reception, which makes him think twice about his marriage. He realises that he is still in love with Nithya. So he breaks off his engagement with the consent of his father and goes to Nithya's home to win her back. Nithya too apologizes to Varun about her past behaviour. They confess their feelings to each other and the film ends with a note being shown that they are happily married and continue to quarrel and love each other.

== Cast ==
- Nani as Varun Krishna
- Samantha Ruth Prabhu as Nithya Yelavarthi (voice dubbed by Chinmayi)
- Krishnudu as Prakash
- Vidyullekha Raman as Jenny
- Shriya Sharma as Kavya
- Anupama Kumar as Varun's mother
- Ravi Raghavendra as Krishna
- Dhanya Balakrishna as Nithya's friend
- Sahithya Jagannathan as Nithya's friend
- Ashwathy Ravikumar as Radhika
- Abhilash Babu as Deepak
- Christine Thambuswamy as Vidya
- Ravi Prakash as Harish
- Kavitha Srinivasan as Harish's wife
- Sriranjani as Nithya's mother
- Jiiva as a train passenger (Special appearance in the song "Koti Koti")

== Production ==
=== Development ===
In January 2011 producer Bellamkonda Suresh announced that he had signed on Gautham Menon, Ram and Samantha for his next production, a bilingual in Tamil and Telugu, citing that the filming would begin from May 2011.

=== Casting ===
In late September 2011, Ram was replaced with Nani, as the former walked out of the film due to unknown conflicts. Nani had previously worked in Gautham Menon's production Veppam. Menon's "regular crew" of editor Anthony and cinematographer Manoj Paramahamsa were part of both films. Although A. R. Rahman was reported to compose the music, sources indicated that he would not work for this film, owing to his other commitments. Menon clarified that he never announced any music director for the film and that he wanted to keep it as a surprise.

=== Filming ===
Filming began on 29 August 2011 with a photo shoot held along with the Tamil version. Initially planned to be a bilingual, Menon decided to shoot the film in three languages simultaneously, with Samantha being retained in all three versions. The film was set to be titled Nithya, after Samantha's character in the film, but was eventually named as Yeto Vellipoyindhi Manasu, inspired by a song from the 1996 film Ninne Pelladutha. Singer Chinmayi will be providing the speaking voice for the female lead. In January 2012, Ilaiyaraaja was revealed to be the composer.

The teaser of the film is released on 14 February on the occasion of Valentine's Day

== Soundtrack ==
Yeto Vellipoyindi Manasu

Soundtrack album by Ilaiyaraaja
- Released: 2 September 2012
- Recorded: 2011–2012
- Genre: Feature film soundtrack
- Length: 42:00
- Language: Telugu
- Label: Sony Music Entertainment
- Producer: Ilaiyaraaja

Ilaiyaraaja chronology
Neethaane En Ponvasantham (2012)	Yeto Vellipoyindi Manasu (2012)	Gundello Godari (2013)

The film's soundtrack album composed by Ilaiyaraaja, features eight tracks reused from the original Tamil version Neethaane En Ponvasantham. The soundtrack album was launched on 2 September 2012 at the Jawaharlal Nehru Indoor Stadium, Chennai in a grand event, attended by some South Indian film directors and other musicians, including Nani who also attended the concert. The songs were performed live by the original artists along with the Anglo-Indian Music Productions orchestra and Hungarian session musicians who had also worked on the film's score.

Musicperk.com rated the album 8.5/10 quoting "Celebration of Music ! Celebration of Raja !". 123telugu.com gave a positive review stating "Yeto Vellipoyindhi Manasu has a few very soothing numbers that remind you of Ilayaraja's golden years in the 80s and 90s. But on the whole, YVM has Ilayaraja's stamp all over it. The songs will take time to grow on you, just like slow poison." Telugu.way2movies.com gave a positive review stating "Yeto Vellipoindi Manasu is packed with Ilayaraja's signature style tracks and with a couple of songs he takes us to 90s feel. As always, Ilayaraja stayed away from the typical formula numbers and offers us soothing, balmy and a pleasant album. YVM grows on you with the repeated listening..."

All lyrics are written by Anantha Sreeram.

No.	Title	Artist(s)	Length
1.	"Koti Koti"	Karthik	05:34
2.	"Nachaledu Maava"	Suraj Jagan, Karthik	06:00
3.	"Yenthentha Dooram"	Karthik	04:19
4.	"Yedhi Yedhi"	Shaan, Ramya NSK	06:07
5.	"Ardhamayyindinte Inthena"	Yuvan Shankar Raja	04:06
6.	"Atu Itu"	Sunidhi Chauhan	03:55
7.	"Inthakaalam"	Ramya NSK	05:57
8.	"Laayi Laayi"	Ilaiyaraaja, Bela Shende	06:02
Total length:			42:00

== Reception ==
The movie received mixed reviews in general, with critics appreciating Gautham Menon's story, screenplay and dialogues, Nani and Samantha's performances, Ilaiyaraja's soundtracks and background score, The Times of India gave a review stating "the movie unravels at a pace of its own and has very few whistle-moments and has loads of drama. This movie is definitely a new feather in Samantha's cap." Radhika Rajamani of Rediff said that the film is a "believable love story. Yeto Vellipoyindi Manasu is packaged with average ingredients -- a fairly average and sensitive screenplay, fine performances by the lead pair, Nani and Samantha, melodious music by the maestro Ilaiyaraja and decent production." APHerald.com gave a review stating "can watch one time". Only for people associated with love 'ever in their life', May do well at multiplexes but not a commercial hit." The Hindu declared that the film was like a "breeze" and felt that the film should be watched one time "with the person you love. An extra dose of patience will help". IndiaGlitz, in its review, said "to be fair to Gautham Menon, he has delivered a realistic conversational love story. If it was AR Rehman's music that was Ye Maya Chesave's raison d' etre, it is the class act of both Samantha and Nani (who is nothing less than a revelation) that keeps some of us glued." Oneindia Entertainment wrote: "overall, Yeto Vellipoyindi Manasu has superb performance by Nani and Samantha. But its dragging narration kills the viewers' interest." Idlebrain.com felt that the film is a "daring attempt by Gowtam Menon to narrate a moments-based film without bothering about payoffs. On a whole, YVM is a multiplex film and we got to wait and see how it fares." CNN-IBN in its review, too felt that Gautham Menon has delivered a "realistic conversational love story" and lauded the lead pair for their "classy act.

== Accolades ==
Ceremony	Category	Nominee	Result	Ref.
Nandi Awards	Best Actor	Nani	Won	
Nandi Awards	Best Actress	Samantha Ruth Prabhu	Won	
Nandi Awards	Best Music Director	Ilaiyaraaja	Won	
Nandi Awards	Best Lyricist	Anantha Sreeram (for "Koti Koti Thaarallona")	Won	
Nandi Awards	Special Jury Award	Gautham Vasudev Menon	Won	
60th Filmfare Awards South	Best Lyricist – Telugu	Anantha Sreeram (for "Yedhi Yedhi")	Won	
60th Filmfare Awards South	Best Female Playback Singer – Telugu	Sunidhi Chauhan (for "Atu Itu")	Nominated	

== Satellite rights ==
The Audio satellite rights were brought by Sun TV Network and songs were aired on Gemini Music, But the movie was never aired in television and stalled due to lack of Nani's popularity at that time. In December 2017, after considering huge popularity for Nani and Samantha the complete movie satellite rights were brought by Star Maa and was aired for the first time on 7 January 2018, 5 years after its release.
