= Lakshmi Bomb =

2017 Indian Telugu-language film

- Directed by: Karthikeya Gopala Krishna
- Produced by: Gunnapati Suresh Reddy
- Starring: Lakshmi Manchu
- Cinematography: Joshi
- Music by: Sunil Kashyap
- Production company: Udhbav productions
- Release date: 10 March 2017
- Country: India
- Language: Telugu

Lakshmi Bomb is a 2017 Indian Telugu-language drama film starring Lakshmi Manchu.

== Cast ==
- Lakshmi Manchu as Judge Lakshmi and Priya (Double role)
- Prabhakar as Vaikuntam
- Posani Krishna Murali as Lakshmi and Priya's father
- Hema as Lakshmi and Priya's mother
- Bharath Reddy as Rahul
- Jeeva as Lawyer
- Amit Tiwari
- Hemanth
- Rakesh
- Subbaraya Sharma
- JVR
- Raja Babu
- Sarath
- Sri Harsha
- Vishal

== Production ==
The film was shot in the United States.

== Soundtrack ==
The film's music was composed by Sunil Kashyap. The audio release function took place on 17 January.

Song title	Singer(s)	Lyricist
"Chinni Thalli Chinni Thalli"	Sunil Kashyap	Karunakar
"Rangu Rangu Pulalona"	Ashwani	Karunakar
"Tharumu Tharumu"	Hemachandra	Sriram
"Aggai Vastha Ninne Buggechestha"	Manisha, Ashwani	Kasarla Shyam
"Lakshmi Bomb" (Title Track)	Manisha	Sriram

== Reception ==
The Times of India gave the film one out of five stars and wrote that "The script lacks any coherence with what the screenplay".
