= The Ghost (2022 film) =

2022 film directed by Praveen Sattaru

- Theatrical release poster
- Directed by: Praveen Sattaru
- Written by: Praveen Sattaru
- Produced by: Suniel Narang; Puskur Ram Mohan Rao; Sharrath Marar
- Starring: Nagarjuna; Sonal Chauhan
- Cinematography: Mukesh Gnanesh
- Edited by: Dharmendra Kakarala
- Music by: Bharatt-Saurabh; Mark K. Robin
- Production companies: Sri Venkateswara Cinemas LLP; North Star Entertainment
- Distributed by: Goldmines Telefilms
- Release date: 5 October 2022
- Running time: 138 minutes
- Country: India
- Language: Telugu
- Budget: 45 crore
- Box office: 7 crore

The Ghost is a 2022 Indian Telugu-language action thriller film written & directed by Praveen Sattaru. The film stars Nagarjuna, alongside Sonal Chauhan, alongside Gul Panag, Anikha Surendran, Manish Chaudhari, Ravi Varma and Srikanth Iyengar.

Principal photography of the film began in February 2021 and ended in August 2022 with filming taking place in Hyderabad, Ooty and Dubai.

The Ghost was released worldwide on 5 October 2022 to mixed to negative reviews from critics and became a box-office bomb.

== Plot ==
Vikram Naidu is an Interpol officer in Dubai who suffers from anger management and nightmares about a riot that took place in 1984 in New Delhi, in which his mother was killed when he was 10 years old. During a mission to save an Indian business mogul's son, along with Priya, Vikram's steadfastness in the mission causes the boy to get killed. After this incident, Vikram develops a guilt complex and becomes wild with rage, where he eventually breaks-up with Priya.

5 years later, Vikram has retired from the Interpol and works as a freelance agent, occasionally helping the Interpol with their missions. During a session with his psychiatrist Dr. Iyer, Vikram tells that Priya has moved back to India and joined the NCB in Mumbai. He also reveals to her that he received a call from his estranged sister and corporate businesswomen Anupama 'Anu' Nair, who runs the business conglomerate Nair Group after 20 years. Vikram leaves to Ooty and reminisces his life of getting adopted by Anu's father, Nagendra Naidu, who was a colonel in the Indian Army, and saved him from getting killed in the riots. Years later, Anu got separated from the both of them, as Naidu denied her relationship with the business mogul named Ashok Nair. As a result, Naidu's health deteriorated. On his deathbed, Naidu made Vikram promise that he will protect and look after Anu.

After reaching Anu's estate in Ooty, Vikram meets Anu, who reveals that she was receiving death threats and fears that her daughter Adithi is in danger as her personal bodyguards are also not trustworthy. Anu requests Vikram to protect Adithi, where Vikram tells her to appoint him as Adithi's bodyguard. Vikram begins his investigation by checking into Ashok Nair's family, while Anu leaves for a business trip. Vikram slowly begins to change Adithi's behaviour and habits. Adithi and her friends divert Vikram and leave for a trip to Goa. While partying with her friends, Adithi and her friends are sedated and kidnapped, but Vikram (having learnt of their location) narrowly saves them. Later, Adithi reveals that she knows about Vikram.

One day, Vikram and Adithi are attacked in a bomb blast, which was meant for Adithi at Anu's estate. Anu gets killed in a car accident. It is revealed that after the mission in Dubai, Vikram went on a killing spree and had vanquished many gangsters and criminals in the underworld, where he was referred as Ghost. The remaining gangsters and criminals began to get scared of Vikram's rampage and later surrendered to him, who spared them. Having survived the blast, Vikram and Adithi escape with Priya, where they also learn about Anu's death. Priya meets Vikram and reveals that the attack was orchestrated by Scorpion, who runs a business of human trafficking, assassinations and narcotics. Vikram and Priya suspect Anu's brother-in-law Pankaj Nair of hiring Scorpion and hack his phone, only to learn that the company's shareholder Harish and Siran Group heir Siddhant Nair were involved in the attacks on Adithi and Anu.

Having guessed that Anu's shares in the company will be nominated to Adithi and that 70% of the board of directors would transfer the shares to Siran Group and merge the company with them, Vikram makes Adithi reveal herself of being alive and manages to cancel the meeting. Scorpion learns about Vikram's past from his father Lala, whose family became his victims during his rampage. Vikram, Adithi and Priya interrogate Harish and learn about Scorpion's farmhouse in Narsapur, Karnataka. Priya heads to Scorpion's farmhouse, while Vikram heads to Siddhant's house with Harish. Having learnt of Vikram's identity, Siddhant attacks Vikram, where Harish is killed in the cross-fire. After an intense combat, Vikram manages to subdue and kill Siddhant. However, Vikram is surrounded by Lala's right-hand man Sadhu and his men, but Lala tells them to leave Vikram as he received a video of Scorpion getting tortured by Priya.

Lala arrives at the church in Goa where Scorpion is kept and begs Vikram to release him. Lala reveals that Anu is alive and had survived the accident, where he kept her alive as a bargaining chip, knowing fully that the need will arise. Lala's men bring Anu to the church, while Vikram throws Scorpion's severed head to him. Enraged and distraught, Lala launches a full-on assault on Vikram and Priya. However, Vikram and Priya gain the upper-hand and kill Lala and his men. Anu reunites with Adithi and rejoins the company by merging Siran Group into Nair Group, where she appoints Pankaj as the chairperson of Nair Group. In the aftermath, Vikram and Priya converse with Adithi as she is now admitted in Cambridge University.

== Cast ==
- Nagarjuna as Vikram Naidu alias Vicky, an Interpol field agent
- Sonal Chauhan as Priya, Vikram's love interest and NCB officer
- Gul Panag as Anupama Naidu Nair, Vikram's sister
- Anikha Surendran as Aditi Nair, Anupama Nair's daughter
- Manish Chaudhari as Lala
- Ravi Varma as Pankaj Nair, Anupama's brother-in-law
- Srikanth Iyengar as Harish
- Bilal Hossein as Scorpion, Lala's son
- Anirudh Balaji as Siddhant Nair
- Dushyant Barot
- Simmi Ghoshal as Shikha
- Vaishnavi Ganatra as Hrithi
- Kalyani Natarajan as Dr. Iyer, Vikram's psychiatrist
- Jayaprakash as Colonel Nagendra Naidu, Vikram and Anu's father
- Raghuvaran as Ashok Nair (photographic presence)

== Production ==
Sunil Narang of Sri Venkateswara Cinemas initially wanted to remake the Hindi film Raid (2018) in Telugu with Nagarjuna. Since Narang was also interested in making a full-length action with the film, director Praveen Sattaru conceptualized a new script which features Nagarjuna as a retired RAW officer. Nagarjuna has learnt Krav Maga and Katana sword fighting for this film. The film was officially launched in February 2021 with a traditional pooja ceremony in Secunderabad. The title of the film was announced as The Ghost through a first look poster on 29 August 2021, coinciding with Nagarjuna's birthday. Gul Panag is cast in the role of billionaire who is a sister of Nagarjuna's character. The film marks Panag's debut in Telugu cinema.

Kajal Aggarwal was first signed in to play a major role but she opted out due to her pregnancy and was soon replaced by Amala Paul in October 2021. Paul quit the film a month later due to creative differences with the director. Mehreen Pirzada was also approached but she was not finalized due to remuneration issues. Jacqueline Fernandez was cast in the role, however, Fernandez also walked out of the film in January 2022. She was ultimately replaced by Sonal Chauhan. Principal photography of the film began in February 2021 in Hyderabad with an action sequence. However, the shooting was halted due the second wave of COVID-19 pandemic. The second schedule of the film began in first week of March 2022 in Dubai and ended on 30 March 2022. The filming then took place in Ooty in April 2022. The shooting of the film was wrapped up by August 2022.

== Music ==
The songs and musical score were composed by Bharatt-Saurabh and Mark K. Robin.

Telugu
No.	Title	Lyrics	Music	Artist(s)	Length
1.	"Vegam"	Krishna Madineni	Bharatt-Saurabh	Kapil Kapilan, Ramya Behara	3:26
2.	"Freedom"		Bharatt-Saurabh	Nikhita Gandhi	3:12
3.	"Dooralaina Teeralaina"	Krishna Madineni, Manojkumar Juloori	Mark K Robin	Mark K. Robin, Roll Rida, Anurag Kulkarni	3:43
4.	"Urimeytee Meghaley"		Mark K Robin	Mark K. Robin, Harini Ivaturi	3:44
5.	"Tamahagane Theme"		Bharatt-Saurabh	Bharatt Hans, Saurabh Malhotra	1:25
Total length:					14:50

== Release ==
=== Theatrical ===
The film was theatrically released on 5 October 2022, coinciding with Vijayadashami. The film was also dubbed in Tamil and released as Ratchan: The Ghost. Before the release, the film received a U/A certificate even though it has violent action scenes.

=== Home media ===
The satellite rights of the film were sold to Star Network whilst the digital rights of the film were sold to Netflix. The film was digitally streamed on Netflix from 2 November 2022 in Telugu and dubbed versions of Tamil, Hindi, Malayalam and Kannada languages.

== Reception ==
The Ghost received negative reviews from critics.

=== Critical response ===
Srivathsan Nadadhur of OTTplay gave 3/5 stars and wrote "Besides the craftiness of director Praveen Sattaru, The Ghost’s major highlight is its breathtaking action choreography - which alone merits a big-screen experience." Soundarya Athimuthu of The Quint gave 2.5/5 stars and wrote "Nagarjuna impresses us with his style and swag but the rest of the characters and the screenplay, not so much." Janani K of India Today gave 2/5 stars and wrote "The lack of solid emotional connect and a ridiculous climax undo everything that had been built so far."

Neeshita Nyayapati of The Times of India gave 2.5/5 stars and wrote "There are moments in The Ghost that will test your patience." Balakrishna Ganeshan of The News Minute gave 2/5 stars and wrote "While director Praveen Sattaru's The Ghost has some slick action sequences, there is no compelling story, which is made worse by a contrived screenplay." Manoj Kumar R of The Indian Express gave 1/5 stars and wrote "The Ghost is neither cheeky as Mr. & Mrs. Smith nor entertaining as John Wick. It's a 150-minute wannabe neo-noir action-thriller that tests our patience."

Bhuvanesh Chander of The Hindu wrote "Praveen Sattaru's action-drama is a case of multiple misfires from point-blank range, and there's very little to take back." Haricharan Pudipeddi of Hindustan Times wrote "Nagarjuna's action thriller has a predictable plot but is salvaged by some never-seen-before action sequences and the actor's charisma."
