= LBW (Life Before Wedding) =

- Official poster
- Directed by: Praveen Sattaru
- Written by: Praveen Sattaru
- Produced by: Deborah Stone; Naveen Sattaru
- Starring: Asif Taj; Rohan Gudlavalleti; Chinmayi Ghatrazu; Abhijeeth Poondla; Siddhu Jonnalagadda; Nishanti Evani
- Cinematography: Andrew Redd; Suresh Babu
- Edited by: Dharmendra Kakarala
- Music by: Anil R
- Release date: 18 February 2011
- Country: India
- Language: Telugu

LBW (Life Before Wedding) is a 2011 Indian Telugu-language film, directed by debutante Praveen Sattaru and starring newcomers Asif Taj, Rohan Gudlavalleti, Chinmayi Ghatrazu, Abhijeeth Poondla, Siddhu Jonnalagadda and Nishanti Evani.

== Cast ==
- Asif Taj as Varun
- Rohan Gudlavalleti as Rajesh
- Chinmayi Ghatrazu as Radhika
- Abhijeeth Poondla as Jai
- Siddhu Jonnalagadda as Rishi
- Nishanti Evani as Anu

== Soundtrack ==
Music by Anil of Gamyam fame.

Track listing
No.	Title	Lyrics	Singer(s)	Length
1.	"Theme of Life Before Wedding"	—	—	1:42
2.	"Reppapaatu Ee Kshanam"	Krishna Chaitanya	Naresh Iyer, Rohit	4:06
3.	"Megham"	Krishna Chinni	Javed Ali	4:38
4.	"Sarigama"	Krishna Chinni	Benny Dayal	3:43
5.	"Aa Rojule"	Krishna Chinni	Zaid	2:32
6.	"Teeraale Vadhante"	Krishna Chinni	Javed Ali, Ramya NSK	3:11
7.	"Vedhane"	Krishna Chaitanya	Karthik	5:04
8.	"Hey"	Krishna Chinni	Ramya NSK	3:15
Total length:				28:11

== Reception ==
Radhika Rajamani of Rediff.com gave the film a rating of two out of five stars and said that "the film strikes a perfect balance and makes for worthwhile viewing". Jeevi of Idlebrain.com gave rating of 3 1/4 out of 5 and opined that "LBW is honest and pure cinema aimed at multiplexes".
