= Gundello Godari =

- Promotional poster
- Directed by: Kumar Nagendra
- Produced by: Lakshmi Manchu
- Starring: Aadhi Pinisetty; Taapsee Pannu; Lakshmi Manchu; Sundeep Kishan
- Cinematography: M. R. Palani Kumar
- Music by: Ilaiyaraaja
- Production company: Manchu Entertainment
- Distributed by: BlueSky (overseas)
- Release date: 8 March 2013
- Running time: 131 minutes
- Country: India
- Language: Telugu
- Budget: ₹5 Crore

Gundello Godari is a 2013 Indian Telugu-language adventure drama film directed by Kumar Nagendra and produced by Lakshmi Manchu. The film stars Aadhi Pinisetty, Taapsee Pannu, Lakshmi Manchu, and Sundeep Kishan. The film was released on 8 March 2013. Manchu won critical accolades for her Performance winning Filmfare Award for Best Supporting Actress – Telugu and SIIMA Award for Best Supporting Actress in Telugu. The film got positive response at the box office, and was showcased at the Daring Independent Film Festival, Toronto. The film was also nominated for Best film at the International Indian Film Festival in South Africa.

The story of the film is loosely based on a novel named ‘Godavari Kathalu’, written by BVS Rama Rao.

== Plot ==
The film is set in 1986, in Bangarappeta village near Rajamahendravaram. Malli (Aadhi) and Chitra (Lakshmi Manchu) are a newlywed couple who are forced to battle it out against a devastating flood of the Godavari River. They lose all hope of survival and decide to narrate the darkest moments of their lives to each other after they find a support to rest on.

First, Malli narrates his story to Chitra. Malli is an honest fisherman who works under Sambasivayya, a shrewd man at the port. Malli's ambition is to own a fishing boat, for which he strives hard. His encounter with Sarala (Taapsee), Sambasivayya's daughter, leads to certain disturbances in his life as Sarala, who lusts after Malli, blackmails him to escort her to a film and if not, she will report their intimacy to her father. Malli escorts her and finally tells that her that he cannot go much further as his life and ambition is getting disturbed due to her. That night, police arrest Malli for preparing illegal ganja. Malli is fired from his job, and his mother loses confidence in him. He finds out that Chandra, a fellow fisherman prepared Ganja. Chandra, after being beaten up by Malli, confesses that Sambasivayya has ordered him to do so as he felt that Sarala and Malli are in love. An enraged Malli goes to Sambasivayya's home to settle the score but finds that he is not in town. As an inebriated Malli is walking away after threatening to outrage Sarala's modesty, she challenges him by saying that he has forgotten that he is a man after the beating he received from police due to her father. Out of anger on her father, Malli has steamy sex with Sarala that night before learning that she is going to marry soon.

Chitra, after patiently listening to Malli's story, starts telling her story. Chitra was found by a couple when she was four years old. They took her to their house, and she started being friendly with their son Suri. Due to financial problems, Suri's mother starts an illicit relationship with Mohan Rao, the town's doctor, in order to gain money, which is misunderstood by Suri. Suri starts hating his mother along with his father, getting much closer to Chitra. Years pass by, and Suri (Sundeep Kishan), now a man, is a mason and extremely fond of cockfights, while Chitra works under Dhorababu (Ravi Babu), a womaniser. One day, Chitra and Suri's mother go to Mohan Rao's clinic. There, Mohan Rao misbehaves with Chitra, and the ladies leave the clinic, which is seen by Suri. Suri misunderstands that Chitra is also romantically involved with Mohan Rao and starts roaming with Bangari (Suja Varunee), a native of that town, much to Chitra's agony. Meanwhile, Suri's mother passes away, and Chitra's marriage is held with an old man. Chitra pleads Suri to annul the marriage, and Suri refuses by telling her what he saw at Mohan Rao's place. Chitra tells the truth, leading to a change in Suri's heart. That night, Dhorababu tries to molest Chitra only to be attacked by Suri. Suri proposes to Chitra but is attacked by his father. Suri attempts to kill his father but is accidentally impaled and dies. Though Chitra reaches the hospital with Suri, she finds that Mohan Rao serving there. She offers herself for a night, and Mohan Rao goes to treat him. Suri dies of extreme blood loss, and Chitra attacks Mohan Rao by pouring hot water on him.

Thus, Malli and Chitra realize their love and wish to live together, but as fate would have it, the support breaks. Malli succeeds in finding a bridge and stands on it. He finds Chitra drifting by and rescues her. Both reach the top of the bridge and are filled with joy that they are alive and together. They throw the ring gifted by Sarala and the chain presented by Dhorababu on their marriage into the flood and start crossing the bridge.

== Cast ==
- Aadhi Pinisetty as Malli
- Taapsee Pannu as Sarala
- Lakshmi Manchu as Chitra
- Sundeep Kishan as Suri
- Ravi Babu as Dhorababu
- Suja Varunee as Bangari
- Jeeva as Suri's father
- Bala Singh as Sambaiah Garu
- Praveen as Malli's friend
- Annapurna
- Prudhvi Raj as Dr. Mohan Rao
- Dhanraj as Suri's friend
- Ramesh
- Pammi Sai as Priest
- Shyamala as Bharani, Chitra's friend
- Preethi Asrani as young Chitra
- Mumaith Khan as item number in "Vechaani Vayasu"

== Production ==
The project was first reported in January 2011, where it was claimed that Lakshmi Manchu would produce a love film titled Gundello Godari, which would feature her as the protagonist for the first time. In April 2011, Ilaiyaraaja was signed on to compose the music for the film and he recorded songs during a trip with the producers to Munnar. The film was dubbed in Tamil as Maranthen Mannithen. Ravi Babu was hired to play a vital negative role in the film. The film is based on the lives of four people during the 1986 floods in Godavari districts.

The first schedule of the film began in Rajamahendravaram in January 2012, while the second schedule was wrapped up by the end of that month. An eco-friendly set is erected with 120 huts and houses in 27 acres of land.

== Soundtrack ==
Gundello Godari

Soundtrack album to Gundello Godari by Ilaiyaraaja
- Released: 18 October 2012
- Recorded: 2012
- Genre: Feature film soundtrack
- Length: 30:13
- Language: Telugu
- Label: Aditya Music
- Producer: Ilaiyaraaja

Ilaiyaraaja chronology
Yeto Vellipoyindhi Manasu (2012)	Gundello Godari (2012)	Touring Talkies (2013)

Ilaiyaraaja composed the music for this film. On 18 October 2012, he flew down from Chennai to attend the audio launch ceremony that was held at a specially erected village set at Gandharva Mahal in Hyderabad. Mohan Babu felicitated the maestro on the occasion in the presence of other Telugu composers M M Keeravani and Koti. Lyrics in the film are penned by Chandrabose, Anantha Sreeram, and R. Ramu.

Telugu

Track listing
No.	Title	Lyrics	Artist(s)	Length
1.	"Gundello Godari"	Chandrabose	Ilaiyaraaja	04:35
2.	"Jillumandi"	Anantha Sreeram	Hemachandra, Andrea Jeremiah	04:48
3.	"Vechaani Vayasu"	R. Ramu	Geetha Madhuri	04:21
4.	"Nanu Neetho"	Anantha Sreeram	Bhavatharini	04:35
5.	"Ekkadundhi Naa Kodi"	Anantha Sreeram	Mano, Anitha Karthikeyan	03:48
6.	"Aa Eedhi Kurrodu"	R. Ramu	Ramya NSK	03:36
7.	"Raathri"	Palani Bharathi	Sri Vardhini	04:30
Total length:				30:13

Tamil

Track listing
No.	Title	Lyrics	Artist(s)	Length
1.	"Gudhikkudhamma"	Muthulingham	Ilaiyaraaja	04:35
2.	"Jikkimukki"	Na. Muthukumar	Andrea Jeremiah, Raagul	04:48
3.	"Vechaani Vayasu"	R. Ramu	Geetha Madhuri	04:21
4.	"Alaiodu Alaiyaga"	Palani Bharathi	Bhavatharini	04:35
5.	"Enga Irukku En Kozhi"	Mu. Metha	Mano, Anitha Karthikeyan	03:48
6.	"En Ooru Erode"	Na. Muthukumar	Ramya NSK	03:36
7.	"Raathri"	Palani Bharathi	Sri Vardhini	04:30
Total length:				30:13

== Reception ==
Gundello Godari got positive reviews. The Hindu gave a review stating "Gundello Godari is not a linear story of how these two protagonists battle the fury of nature. It’s a story of how they share their secrets, battle their inner demons, rise above their tumultuous past and discover love. The film is worth a watch. As a bonus, there’s the maestro’s musical treat." The Times of India gave a review stating "It's the story telling that stands out, and is bereft of the silly cliches that dominate Tollywood potboilers. But if "masala" is your thing, you'll have to look elsewhere." Deccan Chronicle gave a review stating "In the midst of clichéd potboilers and slapstick comedies, this period movie comes as a breath of fresh air and strikes a chord for its simplicity, rooted characters and raw emotions."

IndiaGlitz gave a review stating "With tragedy piled up on inhumanity, Gundello Godari is a well-executed and ordinarily written film. Watch it for the technical values, realistic characters and the simplicity writ that is write large." 123telugu.com gave a review stating "‘Gundello Godaari’ is a commendable effort from Lakshmi Manchu. The movie can be watched once for the superior technical effort that went into the film." idlebrain.com gave a review stating "Gundello Godari is a brave and sensible effort from Lakshmi Manchu. It’s a movie with raw emotions and realistic content."

Oneindia Entertainment gave a review stating "Gundello Godari is a wonderful attempt by Kumar Nagendra. It has superb performances by lead actors and excellent production values. This romantic entertainer will certainly live up to the expectations that it had created prior its release." SuperGoodMovies gave a review stating "Go and Watch Gundello Godari. It is definitely worthy watch for this weekend."

== Box office ==
Gundello Godari opened to good response with an average of 75% to 90% occupancy on its opening day, running houseful at many places. The Movie collected ₹ 5 Crores in its opening weekend. At the end of the weekend, 25 Additional Screens were officially added after noticing the response.
