= A Day in the Life of Lakshmi Manchu's Feet =

Indian short film

- Title card
- Directed by: Ram Gopal Varma
- Starring: Lakshmi Manchu
- Cinematography: Satish Mutyala
- Edited by: Kamal R
- Music by: Seshu K M R
- Release date: 9 October 2014
- Running time: 3 minutes
- Country: India

A Day in the Life of Lakshmi Manchu's Feet is a 2014 Indian short film directed by Ram Gopal Varma and starring Lakshmi Manchu from the perspective of her feet.

== Plot ==
The short follows Lakshmi Manchu's feet as she goes about her daily routine. Her right foot is the main focus.

== Cast ==
- Lakshmi Manchu as herself

Cameo appearances

- Vidya Nirvana Manchu Anand as herself
- Vishnu Manchu as himself
- Manchu Manoj as himself
- Mohan Babu as himself

== Production ==
The film is notably Ram Gopal Varma's first short film.

== Release ==
The short was initially scheduled to release on 8 October 2014 coicinding with Lakshmi Manchu's birthday. The short was released directly on YouTube on the following day and garnered more than 18,000 views in seven hours.
