= Mirza Rashid Ali Baig =

Indian diplomat (1905–1979)

Mirza Rashid Ali Baig (25 March 1905 in Hyderabad – 29 April 1979) was an Indian writer, army officer and diplomat.

== Life ==
Mirza Rashid Ali Baig was a son of Sir Mirza Abbas Ali Baig (1859 - 1 June 1932), Chief Minister of the Junagadh district and descendant of the Timur. Mirza Rashid Ali Baig married Tara Ali Baig (1916-1989).

He studied at Clifton College, and the Royal Military College, Sandhurst. He was commissioned into the British Indian Army in 1924 but resigned in 1930.

He then became private secretary and ghostwriter to Muhammad Ali Jinnah, who wrote the Lahore resolution in 1940 which caused a rupture in the relationship of MRA Baig with him.

Baig then became liaison secretary of the Indian Red Cross Society and the Troops Fund in Bombay. In 1942 he became sheriff of Bombay and joined the Indian Foreign Service. In 1946 he was consul in Goa. From 1946 to 1949 he was Consul General in French and Portuguese possessions in India.

Baig held the following posts:

- From 1949 to 1951: Secretary of First Class and Indian Chargé d'Affaires in Jakarta.
- From 1951 to 1955: envoy in Manila.
- From 1955 to 1961: Master of Ceremonies of the Ministry of External Affairs.
- From 1961 to 1964: ambassador to Tehran.

He had an older brother, Mirza Osman Ali Baig MBE (1904-1992) who was a British Indian Army cavalry officer, then a member of the colonial Indian Political Service and, after independence, a Pakistani diplomat.

== Writings ==
Baig wrote several books:

- M. R. A. Baig on Jinnah, 1996
- The Muslim Dilemma in India, 1974
- In Different Saddles, 1967
