= Osman Ali Baig =

Pakistani diplomat and cavalry officer

Osman Ali Baig MBE
- عثمان علی بیگ

Foreign Secretary, Karachi
- In office 1951–1952
- Preceded by: Mohammed Ikramullah
- Succeeded by: Akhter Husain

High Commissioner to Canada
- In office 1953–1958

Secretary-General CENTO
- In office 1 January 1959 – 31 December 1961

Personal details
- Born: 9 January 1904 Bombay, British India
- Died: February 1992 (aged 88) London, England
- Education: Clifton College, Bristol and the Royal Military College, Sandhurst
- Profession: Diplomat

Mirza Osman Ali Baig, MBE (Urdu: مرزا عثمان علی بیگ, 9 January 1904 – 1992) was a Pakistani diplomat and cavalry officer in the colonial Indian Political Service.

== Biography ==
Mirza Osman Ali Baig was born in Bombay on 9 January 1904, the son of Sir Mirza Abbas Ali Baig, KCIE, CSI (1859-1932) and was educated at Clifton College, Bristol and the Royal Military College, Sandhurst.

He was commissioned onto the Unattached List for the Indian Army as a second lieutenant in January 1924, spent a year attached to a British Army regiment in India and then joined the Indian Army in March 1925. He served with the 7th Light Cavalry until December 1930, when he was appointed to the Indian Political Service (IPS). With the IPS he served in Sibi, Zhob, Mekran and Peshawar in the North West Frontier Province (NWFP). He saw extensive combat during World War II as part of the British Indian Army in several different campaigns in Europe and Burma.

In January 1941, as City Magistrate, Peshawar, North West Frontier Province he was appointed a Member of the Order of the British Empire.

== Roles ==
In May 1943, he was appointed consul for the Portuguese Possessions in India at Nova Goa, and then as consul for the French Establishments in India at Pondicherry. Subsequently he served in the following roles:

- First Secretary to the Agent-General in India for the USA 1946,
- Counsellor Pakistan Embassy at Washington DC 1947-1949 (Chargé d'Affaires ad interim 1947),
- Acting High Commissioner for Pakistan in Canada 1949,
- Minister in the Pakistan Embassy to the USA, Washington DC 1950-1951,
- Foreign Secretary, Karachi 1951-1952,
- High Commissioner to Canada 1953-1958,
- Secretary-General CENTO 1 January 1959 – 31 December 1961.

== Personal life ==
He married Juliette Jamil (1911–2003), an English woman. He had a younger brother, Mirza Rashid Ali Baig (1905-1979) who was a diplomat for India post Independence.

He died in February 1992 in London.
