= Chandamama Kathalu =

- Theatrical release poster
- Directed by: Praveen Sattaru
- Produced by: Chanakya Bhooneti
- Starring: Kishore; Lakshmi Manchu; Naga Shourya; Aamani; Naresh; Krishnudu; Richa Panai; Chaitanya Krishna; Krishneswara Rao
- Cinematography: Suresh Ragutu
- Edited by: Dharmendra Kakarala
- Music by: Mickey J. Meyer
- Production company: A Working Dream Production
- Release date: 25 April 2014
- Country: India
- Language: Telugu

Chandamama Kathalu: Volume 1 (transl. Moon stories) is a 2014 Indian Telugu-language anthology film directed by Praveen Sattaru and produced by Chanakya Bhooneti. The film has eight substories revolving around love. The lives of the central characters in the sub-plots get intertwined with each other. The film features an ensemble cast including Kishore, Lakshmi Manchu, Naga Shourya, Aamani, Naresh, Krishnudu, Chaitanya Krishna, Abijeet Duddala, Richa Panai, and Krishneswara Rao, while Soumya Bollapragada makes a special appearance.

The music was composed by Mickey J. Meyer. The shooting was wrapped up in December 2013. The film was released on 25 April 2014 to wide critical acclaim. The film bagged the National Film Award for Best Feature Film in Telugu for the year 2014 while Lakshmi Manchu won her Filmfare Award for Best Supporting Actress – Telugu for her work in the film.

== Plot ==
Saaradhi is a writer and widower. His young daughter is suffering from a chronic ailment, and he desperately needs 5 lakhs. He starts writing a novel with seven different storylines, all inspired from his surroundings.

- Lisa Smith is a supermodel near the end of her career with no money left.
- Venkateshwara Rao is a bachelor desperate to get married, whose only aim in life is to find a(ny) girl.
- Ashraf has a small department store in the old city and want to marry his sweetheart Haseena.
- Raghu studies in a junior college and he lures Renu, the daughter of a noted politician, in love.
- A beggar has a lifetime ambition to buy a small house.
- Saritha is a widow who reconnects with her college-time friend Mohan, a NRI divorcee who returns to India.
- Raju is a typical village youngster who is busy chasing a girl Gauri.

Haseena gets a marriage proposal from a well-off guy living in Dubai. She betrays Ashraf and marries the Dubai guy – before she even sees him, based on a photograph of him – and sets off to Dubai, which leaves Ashraf heartbroken. There she finds that her husband is way older than the photograph shows and works as a taxi driver.

Raghu turns out to be a fraud who plans to trap Renu for her money. He convinces Renu to elope with him, but before he could get done with his plan, her father learns of this and apparently has him killed.

Raju, one night, sneaks into Gauri's home but gets caught. He is then forced to marry her by their families, owing to social pressure. He sets off to the city, where he works in the municipality. Gauri delivers a baby but dies during childbirth unable to bear the pain because she is not even 16 years old. Raju then starts taking care of her daughter.

Saritha and Mohan, who were unable to get married during their teenage years, finally make good of their second opportunity. They decide to spend the rest of their lives together and set off for a road trip.

The beggar saves 10 lakhs from his begging income (which he stores at various locations in the city in small amounts) and strikes a deal for a house. Unfortunately, he dies in his sleep the night before he could buy the house.

Depressed, Lisa and Venkateshwara Rao both go to the same bar. They are later shown to be married.

Saaradhi finishes his story and goes to a publisher seeking the money only to find that he is out of town. He then finds the beggar's bag with 10 lakhs and has his daughter cured. He gives the remaining amount to Gauri's husband to take care of his own daughter.

== Cast ==
- Kishore as Saarathi
- Lakshmi Manchu as Lisa Smith
- Naga Shourya as Raju
- Aamani as Saritha
- Naresh as Mohan
- Krishnudu as Venkateswara Rao
- Richa Panai as Haseena
- Chaitanya Krishna as Raghu
- Krishneswara Rao as Beggar
- Varshini Sounderajan as Renu
- Vennela Kishore as Lisa's manager
- Amita Ranganath as Gowri
- Gundu Sudarshan as Astrologer
- Babloo Prithiveeraj as DK
- Kondavalasa Lakshmana Rao
- Narasimharaju
- Pavala Syamala
- Surekha Vani
- Duvvasi Mohan
- Jenny
- Surya
- Rocket Raghava
- Jabardast Naveen
- Giridhar
- Soumya Bollapragada (special appearance)

== Soundtrack ==
The music was composed by Mickey J. Meyer.

Chandamama Kathalu

Soundtrack album by Mickey J. Meyer
- Released: 2014
- Recorded: 2014
- Genre: Soundtrack
- Length: 17:11
- Label: AWorkingDream
- Producer: Mickey J. Meyer

Mickey J. Meyer chronology
Seethamma Vakitlo Sirimalle Chettu (2013)	Chandamama Kathalu (2014)	Subramanyam For Sale (2014)

Track-List
No.	Title	Lyrics	Singer(s)	Length
1.	"Chandamama Kathalu"	Ananta Sriram	Kalyani	4:26
2.	"Devuda"	Chinni Krishna	Anil	3:24
3.	"E Kadha"	Vanamali	Sanam Puri, Shweta Pandit	5:33
4.	"Payaname"	Chinni Krishna	Vijay Prakash	3:48
Total length:				17:11
