= Fort Beggs =

Impromptu fort during the Black Hawk War

- Plainfield, Illinois
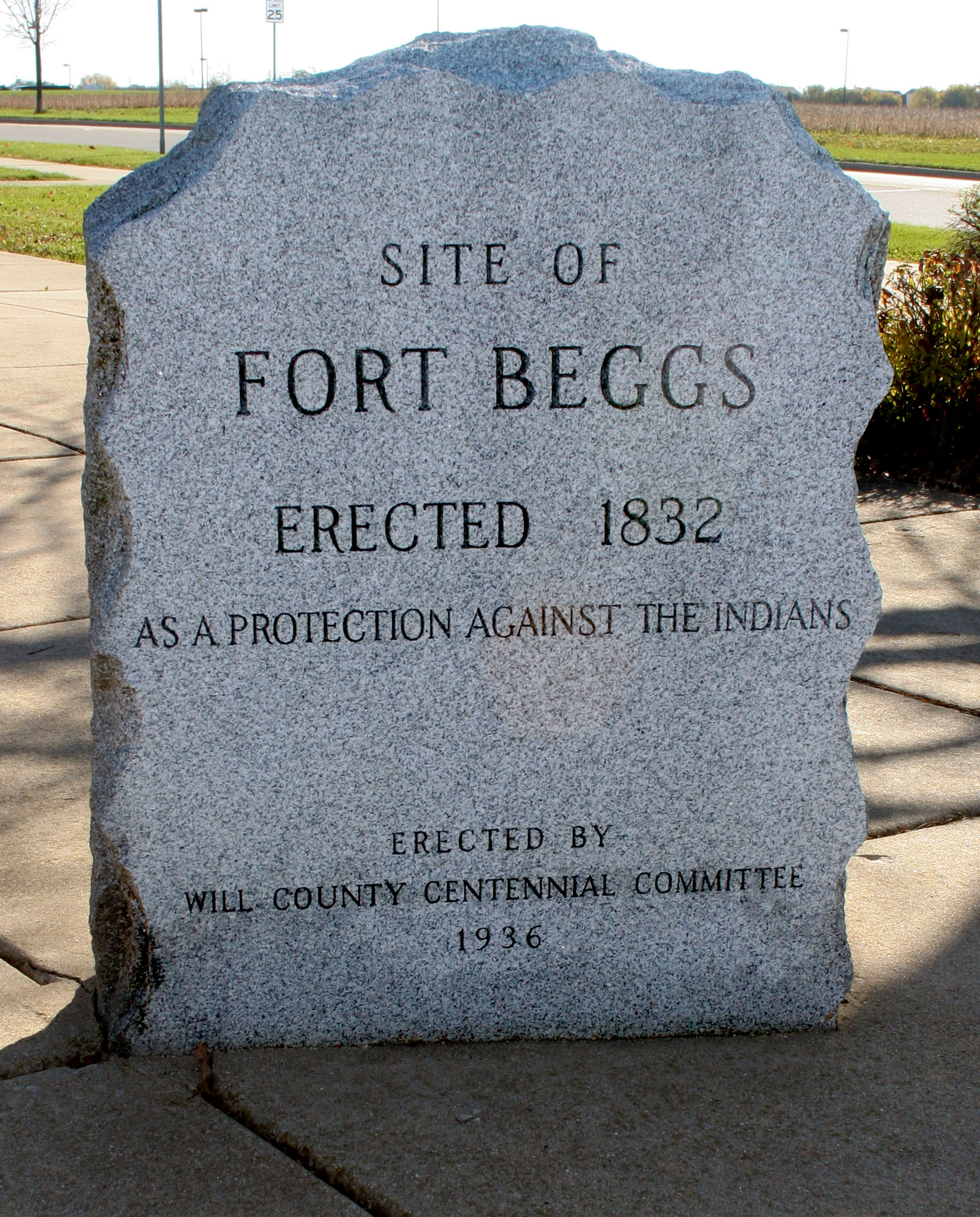
- The monument for Fort Beggs in Plainfield, Illinois

Location
- Coordinates: 41°36′4.97″N 88°12′37.81″W

Site history
- Built: May 1832

Garrison information
- Past commanders: James Walker
- Occupants: Residents of Plainfield

Fort Beggs was an impromptu fort used one week in May during the 1832 Black Hawk War. Word about Indian attacks and massacres from the frontier led the residents of Plainfield, Illinois to convert the house of Rev. Stephen R. Beggs (1801–1895) into a makeshift fort. It was located in Plainfield, Illinois on the DuPage River and a monument was erected by the Will County Centennial Committee in 1936 to mark its location.

== Panic at Fort Beggs ==
Rev. Beggs' cabin was converted to a fort on a Thursday when logs from Rev. Beggs' barn and shed were used for a makeshift breastwork around the cabin and the entire structure housed 125 individuals. Rev. Beggs later explained their dire situation if attacked:

We had four guns, some useless for shooting purposes. Ammunition was scarce. All of our pewter spoons, basins, and platters were soon molded by the women into bullets. As a next best means of defense, we got a good supply of axes, hoes, forks, sharp sticks, and clubs...

By Sunday a group from Chicago being led by Captain Naper and composed of both settlers and Native Americans had come to rescue them. On Monday, the group had split up with some reconnoitering along the Fox River and the others (mostly Native Americans), led by Mr. Lorton (possibly David Lawton), going to meet up with General Brown, Colonel Hamilton and their men near Aurora, Illinois. This never happened because they were captured en route but the Native Americans were "on good terms with Black Hawk" and were allowed to go free. Mr. Lorton, while on his way back to Chicago, briefly returned to Fort Beggs, told them what had happened and explained that an attack would come later that night. Those events are what set off the panic as described by Rev. Beggs:

Such a scene as then took place at Fort Beggs was seldom witnessed, even in those perilous times. The stoutest hearts failed them, and strong men turned pale, while women and children wept and fainted, till it seemed hardly possible to restore them to life...

It was at this moment that they resolved to leave as soon as possible and were in the midst of deciding whether to flee to Ottawa, Illinois or Chicago, Illinois when James Walker (now elected as Captain) urged them to wait until the rest of the men returned. During this wait the settlers had built a wall around the fort out of old fencing and set it on fire so that they might see an attack coming during the night. Captain Naper returned with his men on Wednesday evening, brought word of a massacre on Indian Creek and advised them to leave immediately for either Ottawa or Chicago. The settlers chose the latter, made preparations, and left the next day (Thursday).

== Bibliography ==
=== References ===
- Beggs, Stephen R. (1868). Pages from the Early History of the West and North-West, The Methodist Book Concern.
- Matson, Nehemiah (1878). Memories of Shaubena, D.B. Cooke and Co..
- Le Baron (1878). History of Will County, W.M Le Baron, Jr. and Co..
- Quaife, Milo Milton (1913). Chicago and the Old Northwest: 1673-1835, University of Chicago Press..
- Bateman, Newton; Selby, Paul, eds. (1916). "Beggs, (Rev.) Stephan R.". Historical Encyclopedia of Illinois. Chicago: Munsell Publishing Company. p. 42. LCCN 19017503. OCLC 4242665 – via Internet Archive..
