= Iain Begg =

Economist

Prof Iain Begg
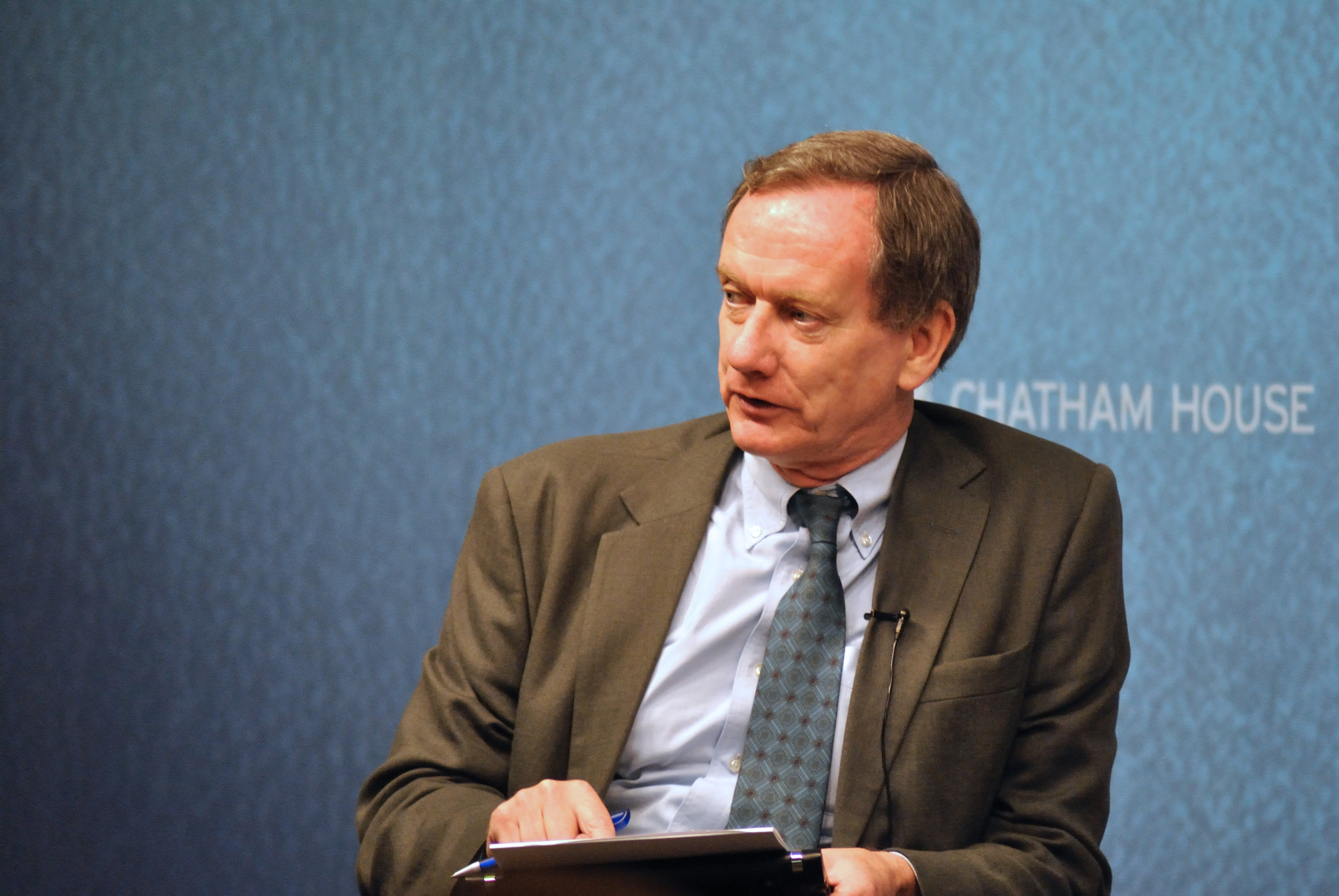
- Known for: Economics

Iain Begg is an economist. He is a Professorial Research Fellow at London School of Economics and Political Science.

Begg has written about European economics.

He was previously co-editor of the Journal of Common Market Studies.

== Selected publications ==
=== Books ===
- Begg, Iain; Grimwade, Nigel (1998). Paying for Europe. Sheffield: Sheffield Academic Press. ISBN 1850758581.
- Begg, Iain (2023). Completing a genuine economic and monetary union. Cambridge: Cambridge University Press. ISBN 978-1108965552.
- Bachtler, John; Begg, Iain; Charles, David; Polverari, Laura (2016). EU cohesion policy in practice: what does it achieve?. London New York: Rowman & Littlefield International. ISBN 9781783487219.

=== Papers ===
- Begg, Iain (January 2010). "Cohesion or Confusion: A Policy Searching for Objectives". Journal of European Integration. 32 (1): 77–96. doi:10.1080/07036330903375115.
- Begg, Iain (November 2009). "Regulation and Supervision of Financial Intermediaries in the EU: The Aftermath of the Financial Crisis*". JCMS: Journal of Common Market Studies. 47 (5): 1107–1128. doi:10.1111/j.1468-5965.2009.02037.x.
- Begg, Iain (May 1999). "Cities and Competitiveness". Urban Studies. 36 (5–6): 795–809. Bibcode:1999UrbSt..36..795B. doi:10.1080/0042098993222.
