= Asgar Baig =

Indian cricketer (born 1971)

Personal information
- Born: 23 October 1971 (age 54); Jaipur, India
- Batting: Right-handed
- Role: Wicket-keeper
- Source: ESPNcricinfo, 30 November 2016

Asgar Baig (born 23 October 1971) is an Indian first-class cricketer who represented Rajasthan. He made his first-class debut for Rajasthan in the 1991-92 Ranji Trophy on 5 December 1991.
