= Rafia Qaseem Baig =

Pakistani police officer

Rafia Qaseem baig
- Born: Khyber Pakhtunkhwa
- Occupation: Police officer

Rafia Qaseem Baig (Urdu:رافعہ قاسم بیگ) is a Pakistani police officer who works in explosive ordnance disposal.

She was the only woman among the 31 police officials selected for an elementary course named the Explosive Ordnance Disposal (EOD), in Nowshera — a programme centred on handling and defusing explosives.

Rafia has said that through this job, she is defying the stereotypes because according to her she had never seen a Pakistani woman be a member of Bomb Disposal Unit(BDU) before. "If KP's women are so daring, [imagine] what level [of courage] male soldiers will possess," she says. Her inspiration to motivate her to choose this path came after the blasts near the sessions court. Looking at her dedicated passion for her country, the Government of KP encourages women from different fields to break ground and join this male dominated profession.

== Early life and education ==
Rafia Qaseem Baig was born in Khyber Pakhtunkhwa. She holds two master's degrees in Economics and International relations. As of 2016 she was enrolled in a program for bachelors of Law program as well. “There are plenty of jobs out there, but this one requires a special kind of courage,” she said. At a time when terrorism was at its zenith in the country, Rafia has served as a police constable for several years in Khyber Pakhtunkhwa.

Sharing her success story at a public event Rafia shared how joined the KP Police department in 2009 and the resolute support from her family helped her achieve her target of being the first lady SHO of the Bomb Disposal Squad among 42 other countries. At the international level she has also worked with the International Rescue Committee. After completing a 15 day long training with 31 members from the opposite gender at the Nowshera's School of Explosives Handling, she was finally set off to be a part of BDU. During the training she learned about the identification of bombs, the types of bombs and ways to diffuse them.

== Achievements ==
During her training sessions she was asked to go to the declared red zones of the country including Adezai, Michni and Salman Khel in Peshawar, the capital of Khyber Pakhtunkhwa province. Rafia and her male colleagues spent 10 days keeping watch over the area. She also happens to be the only female member of an investigation team that rescued Lady Reading Hospital physician Dr Intikhab Alam 48 hours after his abduction in 2010.

Rafia has inspired many women to join the Bomb Disposal Squad including Constable Athia Batool, the first woman to join the Rawalpindi police's bomb disposal squad (BDS). Batool said she watched videos of Rafia searching for signs of explosives and that is when she decided to join the force as well.
