= Mystery ER =

- Created by: Mike Mathis
- Narrated by: Dave Wittenberg
- Country of origin: United States
- Original language: English

Original release
- Release: 2007 – 2008

Mystery ER is a medical reality program, created by Mike Mathis for the Discovery Health Channel. The show features reenactments of real-life medical mysteries, told through narration and interviews.
