= Victor Begg =

American writer

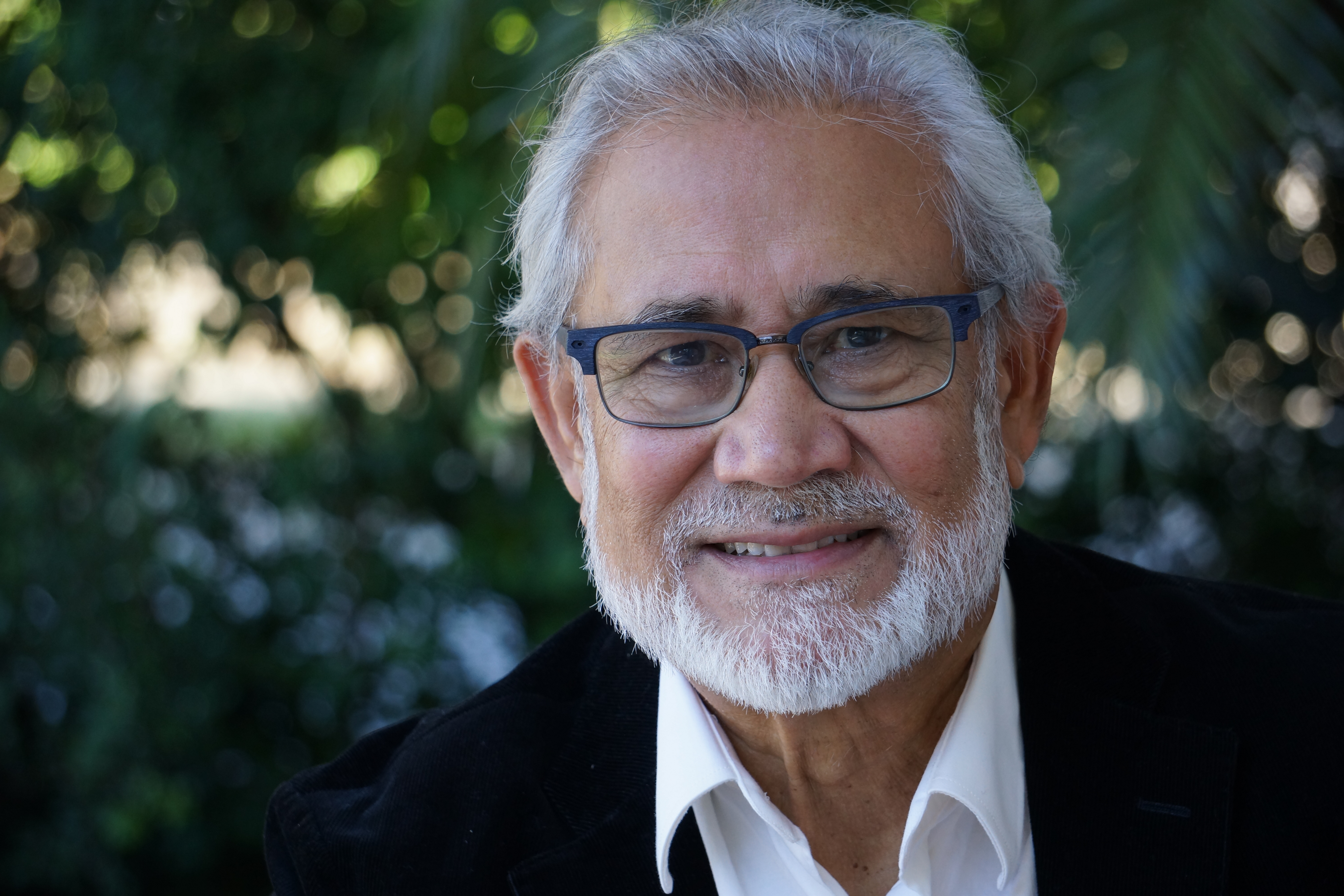
- Born: Mirza Ghalib Begg; 1947 (age 78–79); Hyderabad, Dominion of India

Mirza Ghalib (Victor) Begg (born 1947) is an Indian-born Muslim American author, philanthropist and community leader. Alongside his column-writing and community activism, Begg is a former entrepreneur and businessman who opened several furniture stores throughout metro-Detroit in the 1980s.

== Early life and education ==
Victor Begg was born to an upper-class family of eight siblings in Hyderabad, India.

== Career ==
=== Muslim community activist ===
In the midst of opening the first of his Naked Furniture franchises, Begg began to invest time as a leader in metro-Detroit. In the early 1980s, he co-founded an umbrella organization that would eventually become the Council of Islamic Organizations of Michigan (CIOM) focused on “civic, interfaith, media and other forums to represent a ‘singular’ community voice.” The council was formally established in 1988 and incorporated in 1993. During the incorporation phase, he established the Muslim Unity Center mosque in Bloomfield Hills, Michigan with the intention of creating an inclusive environment for a diversity of ethnic groups and various schools of thought within Islam. He has been widely regarded as a religious leader for Muslims in metro-Detroit since the 1980s.

After establishing the CIOM and the Muslim Unity Center in the 1990s, Begg headed the Muslim American Alliance. The group focused on media, networking and advocacy, and Begg effectively became a spokesman for the community where he fielded queries from journalists and offered perspective on issues affecting Islamic communities.

In 2007, then-CIOM-chairmen Begg organized Sunni and Shi’ite leaders in Michigan to sign a peace pact affirming their commitment to speak out against conflicts between the two sects. Then in 2009, he began a collaboration with Jewish community volunteers in metro-Detroit called “Mitzvah Day,” where non-profit Islamic and Jewish groups collaborated to feed and clothe local residents on and around Christmas. In 2011, Begg, alongside Jewish and Assyrian leaders, organized an Interfaith Health Fair run by the Jewish Community Relations Council of Detroit and the CIOM.

Throughout 2012, Begg spoke out against Muslim violence in response to the publishing of "Innocence of Muslims," a film critical of Muhammad and the Muslim faith.

In 2013, Begg criticized McDonald's for rolling back the decision to sell halal food in Dearborn after a $700,000 settlement against the restaurant chain that alleged the menu items were not consistently halal.

=== Writer and author ===
Currently, Begg serves as a guest columnist for several Michigan- and Florida-based newspapers. He has published work in the Treasure Coast Palm, Detroit Free Press, USA Today, Florida Today, and Lebanon Daily News, among others. He has also made guest appearances on several national news and regional media outlets, including ABC, CBS, FOX, NPR, and the Los Angeles Times His columns often revolve around acknowledging and working to resolve conflicts worldwide involving Muslims and tensions surrounding Muslim-Americans. Begg is a self-proclaimed supporter of the Republican Party.

In February 2019, Begg released his first full-length book, Our Muslim Neighbors: Achieving the American Dream, an Immigrant's Memoir.

== Personal life ==
Begg married Lata Shanbhag in 1975 after meeting at the University of Detroit. They have 3 children.
