= Naeem Baig =

Pakistani short story writer

Naeem Baig (Urdu: نعیم بیگ) (born 1952) is a Pakistani short story writer. He has written short stories (afsanas) in Urdu and has published a collection of short stories and essays titled You, Damn Sala. He has spent most of the time of his life working overseas. He is author of the novel Kogon Plan.

== Publications ==
- You, Damn Sala (ISBN 978-969-9550-05-8) is a collection of 13 short stories and essays.
- Kogon Plan (ISBN 9789699368103) is a spy novel.
