= Mohammad Saleem Beg =

Indian art conservator

Saleem Beg
- Born: 1949 (age 76–77); Srinagar, Jammu and Kashmir, India
- Education: Gandhi Memorial College, University of Kashmir
- Occupations: Art conservator, Historian, Columnist
- Organizations: Indian National Trust for Art and Cultural Heritage (INTACH, J&K Chapter)
- Notable work: UNESCO Creative Cities Network inclusion for Srinagar (2021), Restoration of Oont Kadal, Aali Masjid, Thag Baab Sahib shrine
- Awards: Highest State Award (2017, Government of Jammu and Kashmir), EEC fellowship (1998)

Mohammad Saleem Beg is an Indian art conservator, historian and columnist. He is working to conserve / preserve the artworks, architecture, archaeology, besides museum collections mainly connected to Kashmir heritage. He prepared the research dossier of seven crafts include papier-mache, pashmina, Khatamband, Woodwork, Pinjrakari (latticework), Ari and Metal craft which placed the Srinagar city of Jammu and Kashmir in the list of UNESCO creative cities network for 2021, in the field of craft and folk art.

== Early life ==
Mohammad Saleem Beg was born in 1949 in Srinagar, the summer capital of Jammu and Kashmir. He was educated at the Gandhi Memorial College and University of Kashmir.

After studies, Beg joined government service in the year 1975 and retired after rendering 31 years of public service as the Director General of Tourism, Government of Jammu and Kashmir. Since 2006 he is convener of the Indian National Trust for Art and Cultural Heritage – INTACH, J&K Chapter.

== Awards and recognition ==
For his contribution in preserving, documenting and dissemination of the ethno cultura heritage of Kashmir, Beg won the highest State Award in 2017 from the Government of Jammu and Kashmir. He was awarded an EEC fellowship in 1998. Besides, he has been awarded by a number of universities, NGOs for his outstanding work in the field of research and documentation.

== Work and contribution ==
In 2013, Beg was appointed as a member of the organisation of India - National Monument Authority (NMA), Government of India where he served for five year. As a conservator-restorer his documentation work has provided a base to declare Srinagar among 49 cities as part of the creative city network by the United Nations Educational, Scientific and Cultural Organization (UNESCO) under the Crafts and Folk Arts category in 2021. Restoration of past glory of Mughal era camel hump-shaped Oont Kadal in middle of Dal Lake and Aali Masjid an Architecture of 15th Century and Thag Baab Sahib (RA) shrine in Srinagar District of Jammu and Kashmir was done by him.

== See also ==
- Shujaat Bukhari
- Javaid Rahi
