= Mirza Farhatullah Baig =

Indian Urdu writer

- مرزا فرحت اللہ بیگ (Urdu)
- Born: 1 September 1883; Delhi, British India (now India)
- Died: 27 April 1947 (aged 63); Hyderabad, Hyderabad State, British India (now Telangana, India)
- Occupation: Writer
- Writing career
- Pen name: Farh
- Language: Urdu

Mirza Farhatullah Baig (Urdu: مرزا فرحت اللہ بیگ) was an Indian Urdu writer of humor and prose, and a senior judge in Hyderabad State.
