= Gail Beggs =

Canadian government minister

Gail Beggs was deputy minister of the environment in Ontario, Canada. She was elected Chair of the Great Lakes Fishery Commission in 1995.

She serves on the board of directors of the Condominium Management Regulatory Authority of Ontario (CMRAO).
