= M. A. B. Beg =

Mirza Abdul Baqi Bég
- Born: 20 September 1934; Etawah, Uttar Pradesh, India
- Died: 30 January 1990 (aged 55); New York City, US
- Resting place: New York City, US
- Citizenship: Pakistani
- Education: University of Sindh; University of Karachi; Pittsburgh University
- Known for: SU(6) theory and Quark model
- Scientific career
- Fields: Theoretical physics
- Workplaces: Rockefeller University; Brookhaven National Laboratory; Pakistan Atomic Energy Commission; Quaid-i-Azam University
- Thesis: Annihilation of positrons in an electron gas with application to metals (1958)
- Doctoral advisor: Philip M. Stehle

Mirza Abdul Baqi Bég (20 September 1934 – 30 January 1990), also known as MAB Bég or Baqi Bég, was a Pakistani theoretical physicist and a professor of physics at the Rockefeller University whose contributions were vital in string theory and particle physics. He is mainly known for his role in laying down the theoretical foundations of the quark theory as well as developing the SU(6) model.

== Biography ==
Bég was born in Etawah, Uttar Pradesh in India on 20 September 1934. Following the partition of India in 1947, his family migrated to Pakistan, only to be settled in Karachi, Sindh, Pakistan. After finishing school in Karachi, Bég went to attend the University of Sindh in Hyderabad, graduated with BSc with honors in Physics in 1951. Upon returning to Karachi, Bég attended the Karachi University where he graduated with his MSc in Mathematics with area focused on the applied application in 1954. Bég went to United States for his doctoral studies, attending the University of Pittsburgh, where he was conferred with PhD in nuclear physics under Dr. Philip M. Stehl in 1958.

Before moving to England, Bég's early work was focused toward nuclear physics, and got interested in theoretical physics after accepting his postdoctoral fellowship (1958-1960) at the University of Birmingham, working under Sir Rudolf Peierls at the department of physics, followed by his second post-doc at the Brookhaven National Laboratory at Upton, New York. His work at BNL earned him a membership at the Institute for Advanced Study in Princeton, New Jersey (1962–64), where he spent two highly-productive years in developing the foundations of valuable work he later carried out.

He joined the faculty of physics at the Rockefeller University in 1964 and was promoted to full Professor in 1968. Soon after his appointment, beginning with 1965 he became a consultant at the Brookhaven National Laboratory (serving on its High Energy Advisory Committee from 1975 to 1978, which took decisions on the selection of experiments to be conducted at the laboratory.) He also contributed significantly to other global particle physics endeavors, most notably, at the Stanford Linear Accelerator Center and at the European Organization for Nuclear Research. He was appointed as a fellow of the American Physical Society and the New York Academy of Sciences, in addition to recognition by the American Institute of Physics.

Beg made a number of contributions to the then pioneering efforts in the structure of elementary particles and the development of the quark theory, especially contributing to the important symmetries in physics which underlie our understanding of the elementary particles. His important work lies in the domain of group theory, especially in the SU(6) model. He was a driving force and inspiration for generations of particle physicists.

Beg was a bona fide and valuable citizen scientist and believed in science as a tool for human development and uplift. "He held the view that science, in particular fundamental science, is the best catalyst for inducing far reaching socio-political changes in contemporary societies and that it provides a universal opportunity to make a lasting contribution to human knowledge.", based on which The Emerging Nations Science Foundation (ESNF), a non-governmental organization based in Trieste, Italy, has constituted a prize in his memory, named the "ENSF Prize in Physics (In memoriam M.A.B. Beg)".

He died peacefully at his home in Manhattan, New York, on 30 January 1990, survived by his wife Nancie. An obituary was published in New York Times on 1 February 1990.

A memorial was published in his memory (widely known as The "M.A.B. Beg Memorial Volume") in 1991 by World Scientific, which includes several papers written by him as well as other prominent particle physicists.
