= Chay Varsham =

Chay Varsham چاي ورشام
- Village
- Location within Iran
- Coordinates: 31°21′28″N 49°10′12″E
- Country: Iran
- Province: Khuzestan
- County: Ahvaz
- Bakhsh: Central
- Rural District: Gheyzaniyeh

Population (2006)
  - Total: 60
- Time zone: UTC+3:30 (IRST)
  - Summer (DST): UTC+4:30 (IRDT)

Chay Varsham (Persian: چاي ورشام, also Romanized as Chāy Varshām; also known as Chāh Varshān, Chāy Varshān, Shāh Varshān, and Varshān) is a village in Gheyzaniyeh Rural District, in the Central District of Ahvaz County, Khuzestan Province, Iran. At the 2006 census, its population was 60, in 13 families.
