= Begging for Billionaires =

- Film poster
- Directed by: Phil Klein
- Written by: Todd Messelt
- Produced by: Phil Klein; Daniel Polsfuss
- Edited by: Daniel Polsfuss
- Release date: May 2, 2009
- Running time: 57 minutes
- Country: United States
- Language: English

Begging for Billionaires is a 2009 American documentary film exposing abuses of eminent domain. The film is directed by Philip Klein. The music for the film was written and performed by Tom Goodkind of the Washington Squares.
