= Qismat Baig =

Pakistani actress (1987–2016)

- قسمت بیگ
- Born: Hina Jabeen Baig; 1987; Lahore, Harbanspura, Punjab, Pakistan
- Died: 24 November 2016 (aged 28–29); Lahore, Pakistan
- Resting place: Lahore
- Other names: Lahore's Dancing Doll; Pakistan Dancing Doll; Kismat Baig
- Occupations: Actress; Stage actress; Dancer
- Years active: 2006 – 2016
- Spouse: Raza Muzzamil (divorced)
- Children: 2
- Parent(s): Muhammad Gosh (father); Zainab Bibi (mother)
- Relatives: Sitara Baig (sister)

Qismat Baig (Urdu: قسمت بیگ; 1987 – November 24, 2016), also spelled as Kismat Baig, was a prominent Pakistani stage actress and dancer, primarily known for her work in commercial theatre in Lahore, Punjab. She was one of the highest-paid dancers in the city and was known as Lahore's Dancing Doll and Pakistani Dancing Doll.

== Early life ==
She was born as Hina Jabeen Baig, she hailed from a financially strained family, living in a rented house in Harbanspura, Lahore, with her two children, aged mother Zainab Bibi, and sister, Sitara Baig. To make ends meet, both sisters entered the theatre industry.

== Career ==
Baig established herself as a popular stage dancer and actress, performing in theaters across Punjab, including Faisalabad, Multan, and Gujranwala. Her command over dance set her apart from her contemporaries. Qismat quickly gained fame for her powerful command over dance and stage presence, becoming a household name in the local performing arts scene. She became one of the highest-paid dancers in the city. She built up considerable assets through her career, purchasing properties in upscale areas of Lahore, and also released CDs of her stage performances. After the success of her theatre career she was offered film roles and she was negotiating for roles in Pashto films.

== Personal life ==
Baig was a divorcee and lived with her mother, sister, and two children in a rented home in Harbanspura. She was known to have had relationships with various wealthy industrialists and landlords who frequented her shows. The primary motive in her murder case was linked to her previous relationship with a theatre promoter/industrialist from Faisalabad, Rana Muzamil, who became vengeful after she ended their affair and refused to perform in his plays. Baig had survived two prior assassination attempts, which police attributed to personal enmity.

== Murder and investigation ==
On November 24, 2016, Baig was returning home from a performance at the Naghma Theatre on Ferozepur Road when her vehicle was intercepted by unidentified gunmen on a car and a motorcycle near Palki Marriage Hall in the Canal Point Scheme. The assailants opened fire on her vehicle, and, according to her driver, one of them said, "Kismat now you will not be able to dance," after spraying bullets at her legs.

Baig was shot between eight and twelve times in her legs, stomach, and hands. She and her driver were rushed to the Services Hospital in Lahore, where she died of excessive bleeding after an 18-hour battle for life. Her personal assistant and driver also sustained injuries, but the driver survived. Her murder in a targeted killing in November 2016 sparked widespread discussion about the safety of female artists in Pakistan. She was laid to rest at a Lahore's Shalimar Cemetery.

Police investigators treated the case as a targeted killing and interrogated over 40 theatre actors and personnel, including actress Nargis and comedian Naseem Vicky. The prime suspect was identified as Rana Muzamil, a theatre promoter/industrialist from Faisalabad with whom Baig had a prior relationship. Muzamil had allegedly invested a significant amount of money in her career and became vengeful after she severed ties with him and refused to perform in his plays.

In December 2016, the Lahore police announced the arrest of Muzamil and four suspected hitmen (Habibul Rehman, Muhammad Rizwan, Abid Hussain, and Muhammad Azam) who had confessed to the crime. In May 2017, reports indicated that Baig's family had reached an out-of-court settlement with the suspects.

== Honours ==
Sitara Baig decided to make a film on her sister Qismat's life about her struggle and achievements. Sitara also made a foundation in her sister's honor named Qismat Foundation and she is the chairman of the foundation.

== Legacy ==
Baig's murder highlighted the high-risk environment for female stage performers in the region, with many similar cases remaining unsolved. In January 2017, her sister Sitara, who also works as a stage actress, established the "Kismat Awards" ceremony through the Kismat Foundation to recognize excellence in regional theatre in her memory.
