= Nadeem Baig =

Nadeem Baig may refer to:

- Nadeem Baig (actor) (born 1941), Pakistani actor, singer and producer
- Nadeem Baig (director) (born 1975), Pakistani film and television director, producer and writer
