= Tara Ali Baig =

Indian social reformer and writer

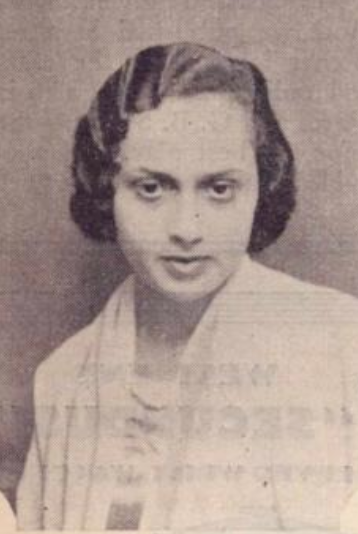
- Tara Ali Baig, from a 1936 issue of The Indian Listener
- Born: 8 August 1916; Mussoorie, Uttarakhand, India
- Died: 1989 (aged 72–73)
- Occupation(s): Writer, social welfare reformer
- Spouse: Mirza Rashid Ali Baig

Tara Ali Baig (8 August 1916 – 1989) was a social reformer, writer, and first Asian woman President of the International Union for Child Welfare in Geneva.

== Biography ==
She was born in Mussoorie on 8 August 1916 and went to school in Darjeeling, Switzerland and Dhaka. She married the diplomat Mirza Rashid Ali Baig and was famous artist Anjolie Ela Menon’s aunt. In 1937 she was appointed to the first Planning Committee as the convener of a group to examine the social and economic disabilities of women. Shortly after Independence her husband was posted abroad, and during their tour she established the Women’s International Club in Indonesia and later a similar club in Iran. When her husband became Chief of Protocol in Delhi she built up the Indian Council for Child Welfare of which she later became president, and she also helped Indira Gandhi (q.v.) to Indianise the style of entertainment for state banquets at Rashtrapati Bhavan. In 1977, she was elected president of the International Union for Child Welfare in Geneva, the first Asian and the first woman to hold the post. She was a member of the Tibetan Homes Foundation and was president of the SOS Children’s Villages of India for 22 years (1967 to 1989).

From 1968 onwards, she was vice president of the SOS Kinderdorf International, Austria. She was the architect of the Child Welfare Policies in the Five Year Plans and a member of the National Children’s Board from 1975. Her books include the autobiographical Portraits of an era; the biography Sarojini Naidu; The Moon in Rahu: an account of the Bhowal sannyasi case; Women of India; India’s Woman Power; and many children’s books such as Indrani; The Enchanted Jungle; and The Forbidden Sea. Her talks over All India Radio and her historical and cultural programmes on television were very popular.

She received an honorary degree from the Tehran School of Social Work in 1965; a gold medal and special award from the International Union for Child Welfare in 1984, the National Award for Child Welfare in 1984; and an honorary degree of Doctor of Law from Alberta University, Canada in 1988.
