= Taher Ali Baig =

Indian playwright and director

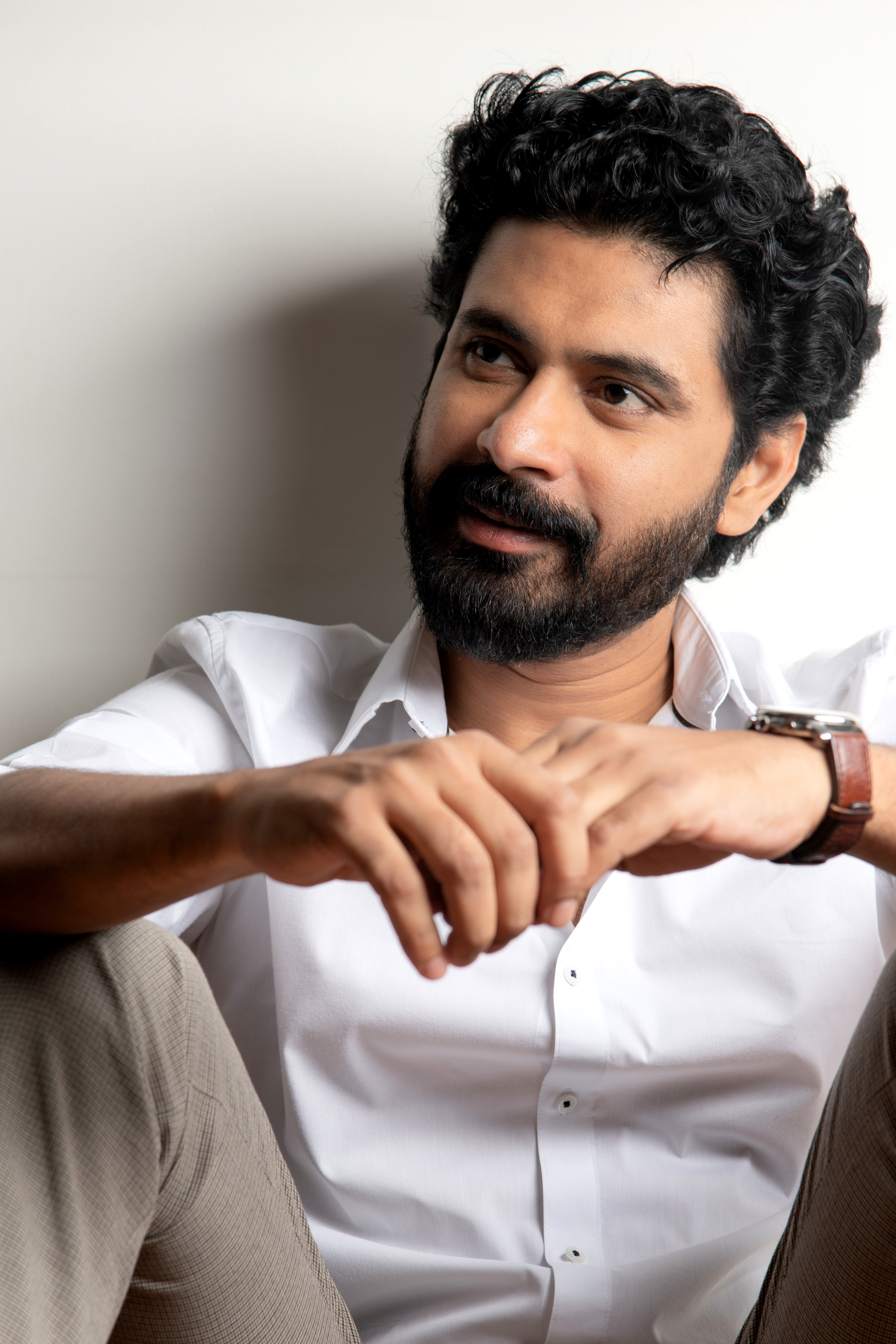
- Born: Hyderabad, Telangana
- Occupations: Playwright, director and producer
- Years active: 2009–present
- Website: http://www.taherali.com

Taher Ali Baig is an Indian playwright who made his directorial debut in theatre in 2014. In addition to his theatre work, he conducts acting workshops and has made advertising and corporate videos.

Taher directed and wrote a short film titled Fitrat, which earned accolades at various film festivals including Best Director at AAB International Film Festival 2020, Critic's Choice Award at L’Age d’Or International Art-house Film Festival (LIAFF), Outstanding Achievement Award at World Film Carnival (WFC), and the Critic's Choice Award at Tagore International Film Festival (TIFF).

== Career ==
Taher began his career assisting director Nagesh Kukunoor. Taher later became a playwright and theatre director. He has directed and produced plays such as Blithe Spirit, Ali Baba 40 Chor, Matilda, Superlosers, Horn Not Ok Please, Unforetold, Thinking Aloud, and Jumanji. In 2014 he directed a play called Distant Plateau.

== Plays ==
Plays	Role
A Distant Plateau	Director, producer
Unforetold	Director, producer
Blithe Spirit	Director, producer
Ali Baba 40 Chor	Director, producer
Jumanji	Director, producer
Super Losers	Director, producer
The Journey	Playwright, producer
Matilda	Director, Producer
Thinking Aloud	Director, producer
Horn Not Ok please	Director, producer
Tale of Dharmabudhi and Papabudhi	Playwright, producer

== Filmography ==
Title	Year	Credit	Actors	Notes
Fitrat	2020	Writer, director, producer	Sudhanshu Pandey, Rajit Kapur	Finalist, Cult Critic Movie Awards 2020. Best Director, AAB International Film Festival 2020. Outstanding Achievement Award, Calcutta International Cult Film Festival. Critic's Choice Award, L’Age d’Or International Arthouse Film Festival. Outstanding Achievement Award, World Film Carnival - Singapore. Best Director (Critics Choice), Tagore International Film Festival. Outstanding Achievement Award, Tagore International Film Festival. Official Selection, Jaipur International Film Festival 2020. Official Selection, Filmsaaz 2020. Best Actor, Best Global Shorts 2020. Official Selection, Prokuplje Film Festival 2020.
