= Fazel Baig =

Fazel Baig فاضل‌بیگ
- Neighborhood of Kabul
- Country: Afghanistan
- Province: Kabul Province
- City: Kabul

Fazel Baig (Persian: فاضل‌بیگ) is a neighborhood in Kabul city's west. It is a populated area of the city which lies beside the Kabul-Kandahar highway.

== See also ==
- Neighborhoods of Kabul
