= Rajendranagar mandal =

Rajendranagar
- Mandal
- Location in Hyderabad, India Rajendranagar (India)
- Coordinates: 17°18′45″N 78°24′00″E
- Country: India
- State: Telangana
- District: Ranga Reddy
- City: Hyderabad

Population (2001)
  - Total: 143,184

Languages
  - Official: Telugu, Urdu, English
- Time zone: UTC+5:30 (IST)
- Vehicle registration: TG 07

Rajendranagar is a mandal in Ranga Reddy district of the Indian state of Telangana. and it is also Rajendranagar revenue division. Rajendranagar is being developed as an IT hub. The Government of Telangana has planned to develop an IT cluster in Rajendra Nagar which will stretch across 350 acres of land from Budwel to Kismatpur. Budwel, Kismatpur, Sikanderguda and Shivarampalli are some of the nearby residential areas. Manasa Hills and Kothwalguda Eco Park are tourist attractions in Rajendranagar.

== Demographics ==
As of 2001 India census, Rajendranagar had a population of 143,184. Males constitute 52% of the population and females 48%. Rajendranagar has an average literacy rate of 55%, lower than the national average of 59.5%: male literacy is 62%, and female literacy is 48%. In Rajendranagar, 15% of the population is under 6 years of age.

== Features ==
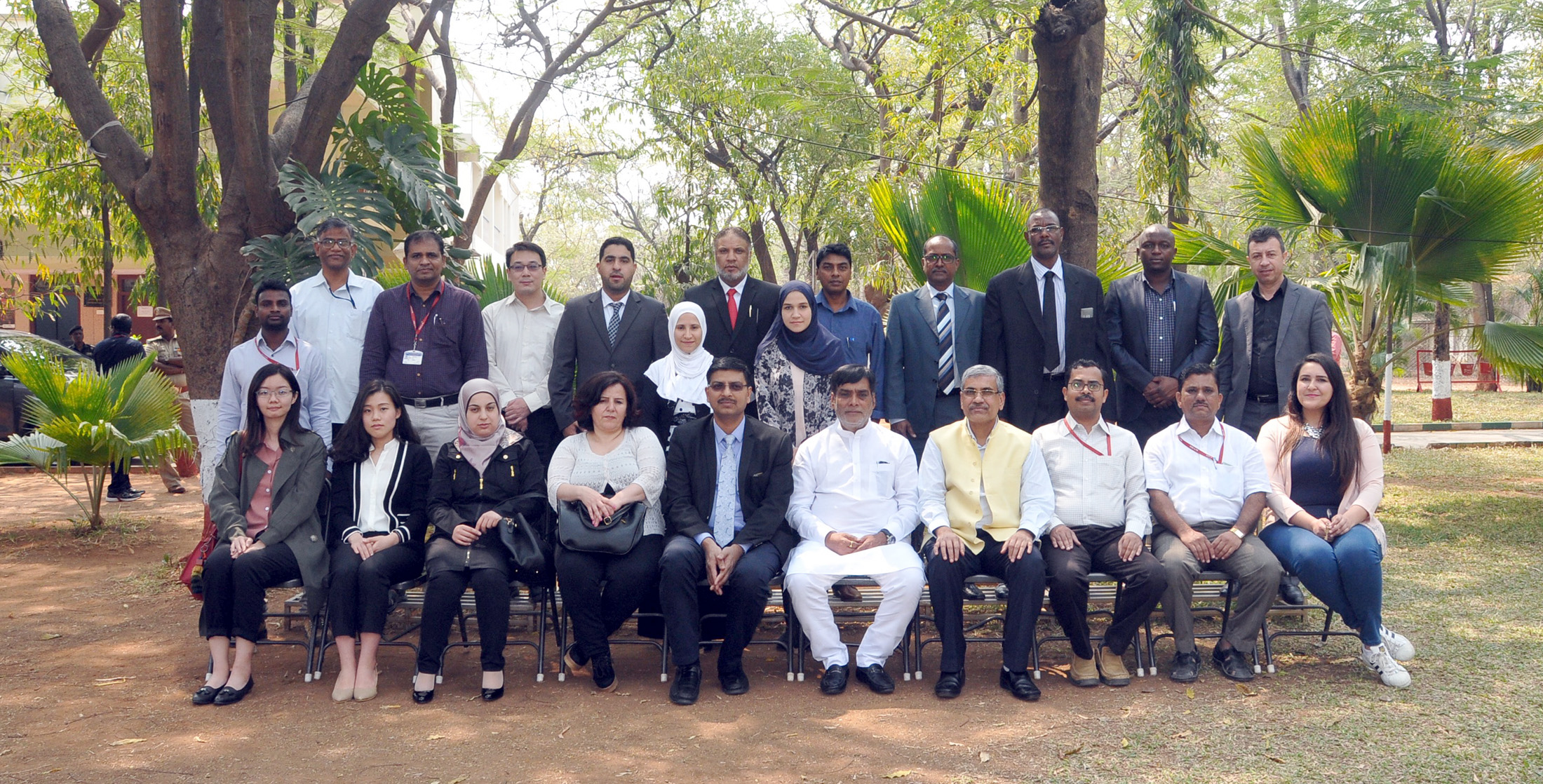
National Institute of Rural Development and Panchayati Raj, Police Quarters, Rajendranagar mandal

Some of the prominent establishments located in Rajendranagar include:

- Sri P.V. Narasimha Rao Telangana State University for Veterinary, Animal and Fishery Sciences (PVNRTVU)
- Sri Konda Laxman Telangana State Horticultural University
- Professor Jayashankar Telangana State Agricultural University (PJTSAU)
- National Institute of Rural Development (NIRD)
- National Academy of Agricultural Research Management (NAARM, ICAR)
- National Institute of Agricultural Extension Management (MANAGE)
- National Fisheries Development Board

== Panchayats ==
There are 14 panchayats in Rajendranagar mandal.

- Bandlaguda Jagir (now municipality)
- Gandipet (village and panchayat, now merged with Narsingi municipality)
- Himayat Sagar (village and panchayat)
- Hydershakote (now municipality)
- Khanapur (village and narsingi municipality)
- Kismatpur (now municipality)
- Kokapet (village and panchayat, now merged with Narsingi municipality)
- Manchirevula (village and panchayat, now merged with Narsingi municipality)
- Manikonda (village and panchayat, new municipality Manikonda formed)
- Narsingi (village and panchayat, new municipality Narsingi formed)
- Neknampur (now Manikonda municipality)
- Peeram Cheruvu (now municipality)
- Puppalguda (Now Manikonda municipality)
- Vattinagulapally (Now narsingi municipality)
- Rajendranagar (village and Municipal Council)
