= Kismatpur =

- Census town
- Location in Hyderabad Telangana Location in India
- Country: India
- State: Telangana
- District: Ranga Reddy
- Metro: Rangareddy district

Area
  - Total: 4.17 km^{2} (1.61 sq mi)

Population (2011)
  - Total: 7,288
  - Density: 1,750/km^{2} (4,530/sq mi)

Languages
  - Official language: Telugu, Urdu
- Time zone: UTC+5:30 (IST)
- Planning agency: Panchayat
- Civic agency: Mandal Office

Kismatpur is a census town in Ranga Reddy district, Telangana, India. It falls under Gandipet Mandal. However, the village was merged into the Hyderabad Metropolitan Development Authority (HMDA) and this is one of the biggest triggers for fast infrastructural growth and development in the area. Kismatpur offers good infrastructure and is well planned with good connectivity options for its residents.

Nawab Khwaja Abid Siddiqi is buried in Kismatpur near Attapur Himayatsagar only a few kilometres from where he had died at Golconda. He is the ancestor of the Nizams of Hyderabad, and was the Chief Commander of Mughal emperor Aurangzeb's Army during the siege of Golconda.

With steady growth in the real estate sector, Hyderabad is currently witnessing development and transformation of several surrounding areas on its outskirts. Kismatpur is one such area which is speculated the possible next big real estate hotspot in Telangana.

== Developments ==
Here are some of the key aspects that make Kismatpur a good bet for future growth

- Kismatpur is directly linked to the Outer Ring Road at the Appa Junction.
- The Rajiv Gandhi International Airport is just 20 kilometres away from Kismatpur.
- The Financial District at Gachibowli is also located only 14 kilometres away.
- Kismatpur is popular amongst professionals working in the IT and ITeS sectors and in the Financial District for its proximity to their places of work, serene and peaceful ambience and rapidly developing infrastructure.
- Kismatpur offers comparatively affordable housing units to buyers including several apartments and villas alike. The reasonable pricing is a major draw for buyers working in Financial District, Gachibowli and other surrounding areas.
- The Mehdipatnam Junction is just 8 kilometres away from the locality.
- The area is a magnet for first-time home buyers and young families with prices being reasonable and there being many options in the entry-level and mid-range category.
- Bus connectivity is good in the area with easy access to Vikarabad, Chevella, Chilkur, Shamshabad and several other areas.
- Roads going to Bandlaguda from Kismatpur are now being extended into two-way thoroughfares.
- An elevated flyover will be built from Nalgonda X Roads to the Owaisi Hospital and the Chandrayan Gutta Flyover will be extended for enabling seamless traffic flow between Kismatpur and Malakpet.
- Sobha Kismatpur is an upcoming ultra-high-rise luxury residential project by Sobha Limited, located in the growing south-west corridor of Kismatpur, Hyderabad.

== Facilities ==
Kismatpur has seen multiple new projects being developed in recent times nearby including PBEL City, Urbanwinds by Gowra Ventures, Maple Town Villas, SMR Harmony, Giridhari Executive Park, ISOLA and many more. The growth of Cyberabad into a major IT hotspot has definitely led to the development of Kismatpur. It is home to the Sri Raghavendra Sports Estate which is a major Cricket venue and there is a major suburb named Suncity inside the locality which is home to several supermarkets and stores including Heritage Fresh, Reliance Fresh and More shop among others.

There are several banquet halls in the area which is also dotted by trees and the military zone is also well maintained. The surrounding areas include Gandamguda, Bandlaguda, Peerancheruvu and Hydershakote. There is easy access to the Mrugavani National Park and the Osman Sagar and Himayat Sagar fresh water lakes as well.

== Education ==
Some of the leading educational institutions in the area include,

- Hidayah Islamic International School
- TIME School
- Sri Vidyaranya International school
- Glendale Academy
- Shadan Institute of Medical Sciences
- Army Public School
- Kinderland Preschool
- Baalyam Pre-School & Daycare
- Little Angels School
- Don Bosco School
- Pristine Public School
- Archangels High School
- Living Bridge Montessori School
- Small Wonders Play School
- Global Discovery Academy
- New Little Scholars High School

== Hospitals ==
Here are some of the key healthcare centers in and around the area:

- Cocoon Hospital
- Crayons Hospital
- Al Shifa Mother & Child Hospital
- Amaan Multi Specialty Hospital
- Sun City Nursing Home

== Key Attractions ==
Here are some of the key attractions in and around the area:

- Sri Raghavendra Sports Estate
- Mantra Mall and Cinepolis
- Mcube Mall and Multiplex
- Ocean Park
- Himayat Sagar lake
- Chilkoor Balaji Temple
- Osman Sagar lake
- Sangam
- Kali Temple
- Golkonda Fort
