= List of Indian superhero films =

This is a list of Indian superhero films.

Please use the talk page to discuss whether a film could be considered "superhero" or not.

Currently, articles in Category:Indian superhero films are considered for the list. Films, whose central theme does not fit the superhero genre, are not considered for this list, even if they have certain superhero elements (such as Kalki 2898 AD, Mirai and Brahmāstra: Part One – Shiva).

== Highest grossing Indian superhero films ==
This is a list of top 10 Indian superhero films by lifetime gross box office collections.

Background shading indicates that a film is currently showing in theatres worldwide.

Highest grossing Indian films of 2025
| Rank | Title | Year | Language | Worldwide gross | Ref. |
|---|---|---|---|---|---|
| 1 | Krrish 3 | 2013 | Hindi | ₹393 crore | |
| 2 | Lokah Chapter 1: Chandra | 2025 | Malayalam | ₹305 crore | (Note: Lokah Chapter 1: Chandra's reported worldwide gross is from ₹305.39 crore (The Telegraph) to ₹302.5 crore (ThePrint) to ₹303.2 crore (The Week). to ₹304 crore (The Hollywood Reporter)) |
| 3 | Hanu-Man | 2024 | Telugu | ₹296.5 crore | |
| 4 | Ra.One | 2011 | Hindi | ₹207 crore | |
| 5 | Krrish | 2006 | Hindi | ₹126 crore | |
| 6 | Maaveeran | 2023 | Tamil | ₹89 crore | |
| 7 | Velayudham | 2011 | Tamil | ₹60 crore | |
| 8 | A Flying Jatt | 2016 | Hindi | ₹56 crore | |
| 9 | Attack: Part 1 | 2022 | Hindi | ₹31.61 crore | |
| 10 | Bagheera | 2024 | Kannada | ₹30 crore | |

== List of Indian superhero films ==
| Year | Title | Director | Language(s) | Ref. |
|---|---|---|---|---|
| 1960 | Superman | Anant Thakur | Hindi | |
| 1960 | Return of Mr. Superman | Manmohan Sabir | Hindi | |
| 1969 | Goopy Gyne Bagha Byne | Satyajit Ray | Bengali | |
| 1980 | Superman | V. Madhusudhana Rao | Telugu | |
| 1980 | Hirak Rajar Deshe | Satyajit Ray | Bengali | |
| 1985 | Shiv Ka Insaaf | Raj N. Sippy | Hindi | |
| 1987 | Mr. India | Shekhar Kapur | Hindi | |
| 1987 | Superman | B. Gupta | Hindi | |
| 1989 | Toofan | Ketan Desai | Hindi | |
| 1989 | Jai Karnataka | Dwarakish | Kannada | |
| 1991 | Ajooba | Shashi Kapoor, Gennady Vasilyev | Hindi; Russian | |
| 1992 | Goopy Bagha Phire Elo | Satyajit Ray | Bengali | |
| 2006 | Alag | Ashu Trikha | Hindi | |
| 2006 | Krrish | Rakesh Roshan | Hindi | |
| 2007 | Athisayan | Vinayan | Malayalam | |
| 2008 | Drona | Goldie Behl | Hindi | |
| 2009 | Kanthaswamy | Susi Ganesan | Tamil | |
| 2011 | Zokkomon | Satyajit Bhatkal | Hindi | |
| 2011 | Ra.One | Anubhav Sinha | Hindi | |
| 2011 | Velayudham | Mohan Raja | Tamil | |
| 2012 | Mugamoodi | Mysskin | Tamil | |
| 2013 | Krrish 3 | Rakesh Roshan | Hindi | |
| 2014 | Little Superman | Vinayan | Malayalam | |
| 2015 | Baji | Nikhil Mahajan | Marathi | |
| 2016 | A Flying Jatt | Remo D'Souza | Hindi | |
| 2017 | Sniff | Amole Gupte | Hindi | |
| 2017 | Super Singh | Anurag Singh | Punjabi | |
| 2018 | Bhavesh Joshi Superhero | Vikramaditya Motwane | Hindi | |
| 2019 | Hero | P. S. Mithran | Tamil | |
| 2021 | Minnal Murali | Basil Joseph | Malayalam | |
| 2022 | Attack: Part 1 | Lakshya Raj Anand | Hindi | |
| 2023 | Veeran | ARK Saravan | Tamil | |
| 2023 | Maaveeran | Madonne Ashwin | Tamil | |
| 2024 | Hanu-Man | Prasanth Varma | Telugu | |
| 2024 | Bagheera | Dr.Suri | Kannada | |
| 2025 | Lokah Chapter 1: Chandra | Dominic Arun | Malayalam | |
| 2026 | The Great Grand Superhero: The Arrival of Aliens) | Manish Saini | Hindi | |
