= Hanu-Man =

2024 Indian film by Prasanth Varma

- Theatrical release poster
- Directed by: Prasanth Varma
- Screenplay by: Scriptsville
- Story by: Prasanth Varma
- Produced by: K. Niranjan Reddy
- Starring: Teja Sajja; Amritha Aiyer; Varalaxmi Sarathkumar; Samuthirakani; Vinay Rai; Vennela Kishore
- Cinematography: Dasaradhi Sivendra
- Edited by: Sai Babu Talari
- Music by: Score: Gowra Hari; Songs: Gowra Hari; Anudeep Dev
- Production company: Primeshow Entertainment
- Distributed by: Mythri Movie Makers; RKD Studios; AA Films; Sakthi Film Factory
- Release date: 12 January 2024
- Running time: 158 minutes
- Country: India
- Language: Telugu
- Budget: ₹40 crore
- Box office: ₹298–350 crore (Note: HanuMan's reported worldwide grosses vary between ₹298 crore (Hindustan Times, Deccan Chronicle) – ₹350 crore (The Indian Express))

Hanu-Man (also marketed as HanuMan) is a 2024 Indian Telugu-language superhero film written and directed by Prasanth Varma and produced by K. Niranjan Reddy under Primeshow Entertainment. It stars Teja Sajja in the title role, alongside Amritha Aiyer, Varalaxmi Sarathkumar, Samuthirakani, Vinay Rai, Vennela Kishore and Raj Deepak Shetty. Set in the fictional village of Anjanadri, Hanu-Man is the first installment of the Prasanth Varma Cinematic Universe. The narrative follows Hanumanthu, who gains the powers of Hanuman to protect the people of Anjanadri, ultimately facing off against Michael after encountering a mysterious gem.

Officially announced in May 2021, principal photography began on 25 June 2021 in Hyderabad and concluded by mid-April 2023. The film features music composed by GowraHari and Anudeep Dev, digital marketing by Manoj Valluri under Haashtag Media, cinematography by Dasaradhi Sivendra, visual effects supervision by Venkat Kumar Jetty, and editing by Sai Babu Talari.

Released on 12 January 2024, during Sankranti, Hanu-Man received positive reviews for Prasanth Varma's direction, screenplay, the cast's performances, the portrayal of Lord Hanuman, background score, visual effects, production design, and action sequences. The film broke several box-office records, grossing ₹298–350 crore worldwide, making it the fourth highest-grossing Telugu film of 2024, tenth highest-grossing Indian film of the 2024, one of the highest grossing Indian superhero films and the eleventh highest-grossing Telugu film of all time. A sequel, Jai Hanuman, is currently in development. At the 71st National Film Awards, the film won 3 awards: Best Film in AVGC, Best VFX Supervisor, and Best Stunt Choreography.

== Plot ==
In 1998 Saurashtra, young Michael is obsessed with superheroes. After a failed attempt to fly, his parents explain that superheroes are fictional, prompting Michael to murder them in a fire. Years later, he operates in Mumbai as "Mega Man", a gadget-based vigilante aided by his friend Siri, while secretly seeking genuine superpowers.

A divine gemstone, formed from a drop of blood shed by Hanuman, lies near Anjanadri, an oppressive village ruled by the tyrant Polygar Gajapathi. Hanumanthu, a petty thief, has unrequited feelings for Meenakshi, a doctor who frequently opposes Gajapathi. Gajapathi stages a bandit attack to eliminate her, but Hanumanthu intervenes and is severely wounded before being thrown into the ocean. There, he unknowingly comes into contact with the gemstone. His sister Anjamma and friend Kasi find him healed, and he discovers that sunlight activates the gem, granting him superhuman strength.

Hanumanthu uses his powers to defeat Gajapathi in a public wrestling match. Offered the title of Polygar, he abolishes the position and advocates democratic governance, earning Meenakshi's affection.

Michael and Siri arrive in Anjanadri under the guise of corporate social responsibility, secretly investigating the source of Hanumanthu's powers. On Michael's orders, Siri abducts Hanumanthu to learn the secret of his strength, but Hanumanthu escapes with the gem. He later rescues Meenakshi from Gajapathi's henchmen and reveals himself as her frequent saviour, leading them to confess their love.

While investigating Michael's activities, Hanumanthu learns that he plans to release a neurotoxic gas to incapacitate the villagers and obtain the gem. When Siri objects, Michael traps him in a fire, leaving him presumed dead. An elderly sage disguised as Hanumanthu secretly defeats Michael's mercenaries and rescues Siri. During Anjamma's wedding, Michael confronts Hanumanthu and falsely claims ownership of the gem. Hanumanthu exposes his lie, but the ensuing clash results in Anjamma's death. Believing the gem failed to save her because the sun had set, Hanumanthu abandons it.

Michael then releases the gas, immobilising the villagers. As Hanumanthu loses hope, the sage reveals himself as Vibhishana, the immortal king of Lanka. He explains that Lord Hanuman has always aided those who uphold Dharma and urges Hanumanthu to fulfil his destiny. With help from a reformed Gajapathi and Siri, whom Hanumanthu had rescued from the fire, Hanumanthu locates the gem with the aid of a monkey named Koti. He destroys Michael's gas-releasing drone fleet while Meenakshi stabilises the villagers.

Michael captures Hanumanthu, steals the gem and attempts to escape by helicopter. Hanumanthu breaks free and destroys the aircraft, killing Michael in the resulting explosion. The gem shatters and its divine energy fuses with Hanumanthu. Its destruction also breaks an ancient seal, awakening imprisoned Asuras across the realm. Lord Hanuman emerges from his Tapasu in the Himalayas to join Hanumanthu for the impending war.

== Cast ==
- Teja Sajja as Hanumanthu / Hanu-Man
  - Revanth Reddy as Young Hanumanthu
- Amritha Aiyer as Dr. Meenakshi
  - Praanya P Rao as Young Meenakshi
- Vinay Rai as Michael / Mega Man
  - Vikas as Young Michael
- Samuthirakani as Vibhishana, King of Lanka
- Varalaxmi Sarathkumar as Anjamma
- Vennela Kishore as Dr. Sirivennela "Siri", Michael's friend
- Raj Deepak Shetty as Singarayakonda Gajapathi
- Satya as Gunneswara Rao, a shopkeeper
- Getup Srinu as Kasi
- Rohini Reddy Noni as Meenakshi's friend
- Rakesh Master as Puli Raju, Gajapathi's henchman
- Sunishith as himself (cameo)
- Ravi Teja as Koti, a monkey (voice)

== Production ==
=== Development ===
The producer Niranjan Reddy approached director Prasanth Varma to direct a film for his banner after watching Zombie Reddy (2021). After successfully directing Zombie Reddy, Varma announced his fourth film on 29 May 2021, coinciding with his birthday. It was announced that the film will be the first superhero film in Telugu cinema. In an interview with Deccan Chronicle he said, "the film is inspired by the Hindu God Hanuman", adding "As for the title of the film, Prasanth says he chose it because it was a dedication to many who, when they think of any superpower or a superhero in Hinduism, we remember Hanuman. In the film, the name of the protagonist is Hanu-Man", regarding the title of the film.

The film was funded by the American NRI film distributor, K. Niranjan Reddy, under Primeshow Entertainment. It was made on a shoe-string budget of ₹20 crores. During the teaser launch event held in Hyderabad in November 2022, Varma revealed that the production budget increased six times from the initial valuation. Hanu-Man is the first installment of the Prasanth Varma Cinematic Universe (PVCU).

=== Pre-production ===
The story of Hanu-Man came from Varma and was then developed by his team at Scriptsville, a writing team he co-founded with his sister, Sneha Sameera. In an interview, Varma said that his education in a gurukul helped him with the film's research. Varma also sought S. S. Rajamouli's advice while making the film.

Anudeep Dev, GowraHari, and Krishna Saurabh were hired to compose the music for the film. GowraHari composed the background score for the film. Sai Babu Tallari was hired for the editing, reuniting with Varma after Zombie Reddy. The other technicians includes cinematographer Dasaradhi Sivendra, production designer Nagendra Tangala, action choreographers Nandu and Prudhvi, costume designer Lanka Santhoshi.

Prior to starting the first shooting schedule, the team had constructed a studio in a leased land at Vattinagulapally located in Telangana, for filming green screen shots. Prior to the start of film production, Teja Sajja had attended a special workshop, in order to train physically and intensively for his role in the film.

=== Casting ===
Teja Sajja played the titular character Hanumanthu, a superhero, and sported long hair and bearded look. His look was finalised after trying out 25 different looks. This marked Tejja's third collaboration with Varma after their Zombie Reddy and Adbhutham (2021). About casting Teja Sajja as lead actor, Varma said "when I was casting for this film, I wanted to cast an actor who could give his 100 per cent and be fully committed to this film. He had to maintain a particular look and also suit the part. So, I think Teja fits the bill. He is the most lovable underdog and an amazing actor who can give me enough time to make this film". He had to learn scuba diving for the film. Amritha Aiyer was cast as the film's lead actress, and her character name Meenakshi was revealed in December 2021. Varma said he selected Amritha Aiyer after watching "Neeli Neeli Aakasam" song. Varalaxmi Sarathkumar was roped in a pivotal role, and her inclusion was confirmed on 4 March 2022, on the eve of her birthday. Tamil actor Vinay Rai was announced as the film's antagonist in June 2022. Varma revealed that Rai's suit was difficult to wear and lost two kilograms while shooting.

The film also features Vennela Kishore, Satya, Getup Srinu, Raj Deepak Shetty, Koushik Mahata and Bhanu Prakash in pivotal roles. Rishab Shetty was approached to play the role of Vibhishana, but declined the role, citing commitments to Kantara, thus went to Samuthirakani. Ravi Teja gave his voice to the monkey character Koti. The name of the fictional village was announced as Anjanadri.

=== Design ===
Nagendra Tangala served as the production designer for Hanu-Man. The team leased an agricultural land in Vattinagulapally near Hyderabad and designed the sets of Anjanadri there, which took about 150 to 200 days. "When director Prashanth told this story, we definitely wanted to create a new world for Anjanadri. We thought that it should be designed naturally to be close to fantasy and reality. Surrounded by green environment, high hills, and the river on the other side, we were fixed to build it like a beautiful village among Panchabhutas", Nagendra on constructing Anjanadri village. The bank fight sequence was also set there. "Challenge for me was to design the Rudramani which is formed from Hanuman's blood drop. We made more than a hundred manis in various shapes to make it natural and believable to everyone. In the end, Hanuman's blood drop was placed as Rama's name and surrounded by a powerful protective shield. It worked out well. In fact, when this mani was made, the film was 50 percent shot," Nagendra on creating Rudramani.

The team had constructed a set of double-bedroom flats built by the government near Kollur, for filming the bank robbery scene. The team rebuilt the entire Maharshi set on the floor in one day at Ramoji Film City, Hyderabad for filming the film's climax scenes. Nagendra revealed that the team designed the big Hanuman statue in Anjanadri through graphics, inspired by the seven hills of Tirumala.

=== Filming ===
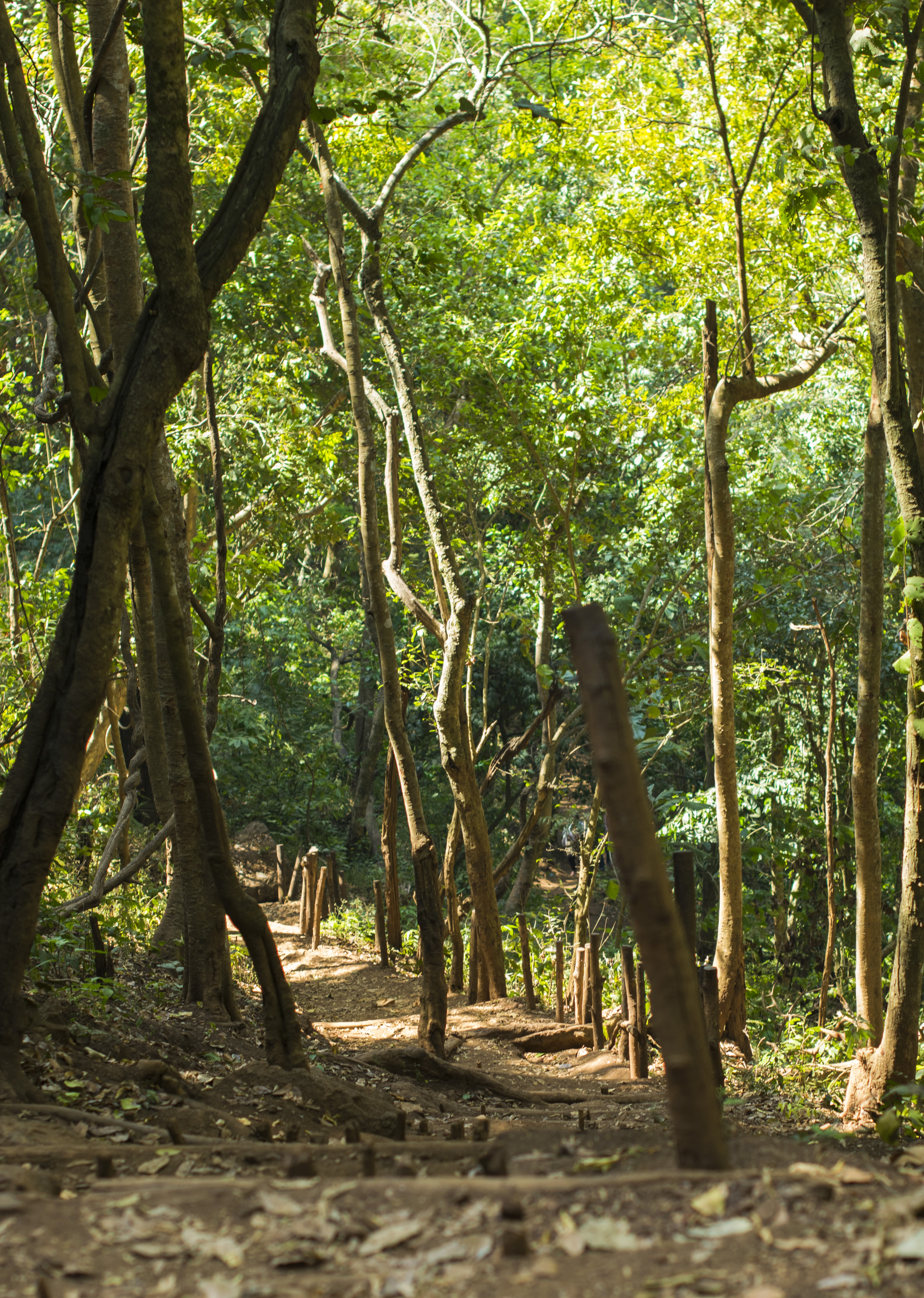
Maredumilli, where parts of the film were shot.

The film was officially launched on 25 June 2021 in Hyderabad, with a pooja ceremony and muhurtam shot done. Principal photography of the film was also done on the same day. As of August 2021, 40% of filming was completed. Filming of a few action sequences and songs took place at Maredumilli and Paderu in Andhra Pradesh in September 2021. Around 60% of filming was completed by December 2021.

The team constructed a temporary studio called Hanuman Studio at Vattinagulapally, where most of the green screen shots portions were filmed. For wide angle visuals, the team moved to Paderu and Maredumilli in Andhra Pradesh. The underwater sequence was filmed in December 2022 in Mumbai. Teja Sajja got trained under a special trainer for fifteen days in Hyderabad for this sequence.

The climax sequences were shot over 40 days, and team built the set at Ramoji Film City. The aerial climax scene was filmed for five days. Principal photography wrapped by 17 April 2023, with filming having lasted 130 working days.

=== Post-production ===
The dubbing process began during April 2022, with Teja Sajja dubbing his portions. HaloHues Studios, Hyderabad was the film's principal visual effects studio. Extensive work on the visual effects took place for more than a year during the post-production process. VFX of the film was done by Venkat Kumar Jetty The picturization of "Anjandri Theme Song" was storyboarded in 2D, but inspired by the visual effects of Baahubali 2: The Conclusion, team decided to give it a 3D feel and roped in Animation studios Flicksville, Visikefi as well as freelance technicians across the country worked for the film. Anjanadri establishment shot, a technically challenging scene lasting over two minutes. To achieve this, extensive research and the utilisation of Hollywood software, coupled with an intelligent pipeline, were employed.

Paderu Girula has been linked to the graphics in this film. More than three thousand photos and videos were taken and they were used in the film to suit the graphics. Varma had the plan to sign Kannada actor Yash to play Hanuman and include a live-action portrayal. It took nearly seven months for the visual effects shots of Hanuman "photorealistic Hanuman in the all-important climax song is the film's USP". The final edit had around 1600 visual effects shots, which constituted approximately 30% of the film. In an interview, Prasanth Varma discussed the utilisation of pre-visualization, matte painting, 3D, and AI art in the film. ChatGPT and Midjourney were used to design film posters.

The special effects was provided by Raghunath. The color grading for the film bagan on 5 October, which was done by Shiva Kumar BVR. The finishing work for the film was performed at ANR Sound & Vision at Annapurna Studios, by colourist Ashwath. The sound mixing was begun on 23 November 2023. The Dolby Atmos mixing of the film was done by Eskala Radha Krishna.

The final copy of the film was ready by December 2023, and was submitted to the Central Board of Film Certification (CBFC) that month. On 29 December 2023, the film received a U/A certificate from the Censor Board, with a finalised runtime of 158 minutes.

== Themes and influences ==
"Superhero is a genre that I always wanted to do, but it needs a certain kind of budget. So then I decided that I'll make a superhero film. Then, around that time, there were a lot of things that were going on in my life, and the name of Hanuman ji kept reverberating around me. I started hearing Hanuman ji a lot in my life. So, I think, subconsciously, I don't know what has happened, I've named the film HanuMan, and I thought it would be really nice if some normal kid like me gets the powers of Hanuman ji."

— Prasanth Varma, on the origin of the film.

Hanu-Man is blend of sci-fi, fantasy and mythology. The film, featuring Teja Sajja as the titular character, revolves around Hanumanthu, a small-time thief, and his journey to save his village and the world after discovering a totem that enhances his abilities. Varma said he was taught history as a subject in school, and was very passionate about those stories, and those characters inspired him to make the film. As he felt he is not mature enough or big enough director to make films on history, he started from doing a superhero film, where a normal boy gets powers of Hanuman, from there on down, maybe mature to direct those big stories. In an interview, he said "I always wanted to do a superhero film. In fact, I wanted to become a superhero! Since I couldn't do that I thought, let me make a film. I didn't want it to be a Marvel or DC-like superhero film but something indigenous and culturally rooted. The first thought that came to mind was Hanuman ji and I wrote the story. Then I got multiple ideas for various superheroes based on our itihaas and it took off from there."

The film borrows elements from Indian mythology, mostly from the Ramayana and the depictions of Hanuman and his exploits in the various oral and written traditions of Hinduism. DNA India wrote "despite the vociferous proclamations of Jai Shri Ram and songs borrowing lyrics from popular bhajans, HanuMan is not a religious film. It is a superhero film that uses mythology and religious elements, blending them with science and spirituality quite neatly." Varma said he didn't view this film as a mythological tale and it would have presented him many new challenges. The film is set in a modern-day world blended with a key incident from Hanuman's life. Varma says, "the film's idea was born out of a small story related to Hanuman and it will leave audience thoroughly satisfied with the visualisation of the character, like how we have imagined him since childhood. We worked on the character sketches alone for a year". "I have always been fascinated by the stories from our mythology and culture. When I was researching 'HanuMan', I found more characters in our mythology that we have not really explored. The audiences are also not aware of them. So I thought, it'd be interesting if I could create new characters and narrate their greatness at the same time", Varma told PTI following the film's release. Varma revealed that he narrated the story to lyricist Siva Shakthi Datta for his guidance.

India Today's Sana Farzeen notes, "Hanumanth attains superpowers, giving him the way to win his ladylove's heart. However, the catch is, just like Koi... Mil Gaya's Jaadu, the power or Hanuman's 'mani' can help him only when the sun is up." She also notes "fictional world of Anjanadri, a land that looks like a beta version of Mahishmati (Baahubali). A huge statue of Hanuman adorns the location as a prelude to all that is set to follow." About choosing the fictional village Anjanadri, Varma said "If Gotham is based on New York City, Anjanadri, which is also the name of Hanumanthudu's birthplace, is an island in Andhra Pradesh, somewhat like Yanam." He also found inspiration from Krrish (2006) and Minnal Murali (2021).

The film has ample references to pop culture elements, Spider-Man, Superman and Batman. The film pays tribute to Telugu superstars such as Prabhas, Mahesh Babu, Pawan Kalyan, Allu Arjun, and Nandamuri Balakrishna. The film also has scenes referring Baahubali (2015), Athadu (2005), Arya (2004) and Pushpa: The Rise (2021).

== Music ==
The music of the film is composed by GowraHari, Anudeep Dev and Krishna Saurabh. The audio rights were acquired by Tips Industries.

The soundtrack consists of seven original songs, namely, "Hanuman Chalisa", "SuperHero HanuMan", "Avakaya Anjaneya", "Sri Ramadootha Stotram", "Anjanadri Theme Song", Meenakshi Intro Song titled "Poolamme Pilla", and "Raghunandana". Lyrics are written by Krishna Kanth, Simhachalam Mannela, Hanumath Ramadootha Strotam, Siva Shakthi Datta, Kasarla Shyam, and Tripuraneni Kalyanachakravarthy.

== Marketing ==
On 21 November 2022, the official teaser of the film was released. Teaser launch event was held at AMB Cinemas., Hyderabad The team introduced NFT collectibles on 13 December 2022, becoming the first Telugu film to do so. On 28 November 2023, Avakaya Anjaneya song launch event was held at Hyderabad. Teja Sajja promoted the film at SREEVISION'23 at Sreenidhi Institute of Science and Technology that held on 12 December 2023.

The official trailer was released on 18 December 2023 in five languages. Trailer launch event was held at AMB Cinemas. Subsequently, the trailer was attached to the prints of Salaar: Part 1 – Ceasefire for theatrical screenings. On 24 December, Teja Sajja promoted the film at the Star Sports Telugu Pro Kabaddi League. Later, on 31 December, a video was released titled "SESH X HANUMAN" on YouTube, in which Adivi Sesh interviewed Prasanth Varma and Teja Sajja.

Soon after, the team has planned a promotional tour, titled "The Superhero Tour," across six cities over six days, starting from 4 January 2024 to 9 January 2024. On the first day of the tour, the team headed to Kochi for a press meeting at Crowne Plaza. On the second day, the team moved to Chennai to attend interviews and press meetings at the Green Park Hotel. Later, interviews and press meet were held at The Shelton Grand Hotel, Bengaluru. On the fourth day, Mega Pre-Release Utsav was held at N Convention in Hyderabad. Chiranjeevi was the chief guest of the event, which was hosted by Suma Kanakala. On the fifth day, an event was held by the film's Hindi distributor, AA Films, at the PVR Citi Mall in Mumbai, where the cast and crew interacted with the media and fans. Rana Daggubati was the chief guest at the event. On sixth day, the team visited the Hanuman Mandir in New Delhi and interacted with the local media to promote their film in the region.

== Release ==
=== Theatrical ===
The film was theatrically released on 12 January 2024 in Telugu, along with the dubbed versions of Tamil, Malayalam, Kannada and Hindi. In an interview Varma revealed that distributors in Japan and Korea approached the makers after watching the teaser. In late January 2024, it was reported that 3D version of the film is scheduled to release in summer 2024, with additional scenes. As of May 2026, the 3D version of the film was announced to release on 25 June 2026 globally. It also screened at the 28th Fantasia International Film Festival on August 3, 2024.

=== Distribution ===
Mythri Movie Makers distributed the film in the Nizam (Telangana) region. The film was distributed across Andhra Pradesh by Teja Pictures (Guntur), Abhi Cinemas (Nellore), Sai Chandra Films (Ceded), Primeshow Films (Uttarandhra), Sri Venkata Padmavathi Films (East Godavari) and Dheeraj Mogilineni Entertainment (West Godavari and Krishna district). Sakthi Film Factory acquired the distribution rights to the film in Tamil Nadu. Sree Gokulam Movies acquired the distribution rights to the film in Kerala. The Karnataka theatrical rights were acquired by KRG Studios. AA Films released the film in North India. Primeshow Entertainment and Nirvana Cinemas released the film in North America.

=== Home media ===
In February 2022, it was reported that the film's digital rights were acquired by ZEE5 and Zee Network acquired the satellite rights of the film. The combined deal of post-theatrical streaming and satellite rights was reported to be ₹35 crore. The film premiered on ZEE5 on 16 March 2024. The Hindi version premiered on JioCinema and Colors Cineplex. The Tamil, Malayalam, and Kannada versions are scheduled to premiere on 5 April 2024 on Disney+ Hotstar.

== Reception ==
=== Critical response ===
Hanu-Man received positive reviews from critics who praised Prashanth Varma's direction, screenwriting, cast performances, visualization of Hanuman, background score, VFX, production design, and action sequences. On the review aggregator website Rotten Tomatoes, 88% of 8 critics' reviews are positive, with an average rating of 5.9/10.

Paul Nicodemus of The Times of India gave 3.5/5 stars and wrote "With solid storytelling, impressive visuals, and strong performances, the film successfully merges elements of mythology with contemporary action, offering a unique viewing experience in Indian cinema." Bhavana Sharma of Deccan Chronicle gave 3.5/5 and stated "HanuMan" stands as a solid entertainer with a rich tapestry of drama, emotions, and mythology skillfully woven together." Sana Farzeen of India Today gave 3.5/5 stars and wrote "The music is quite pleasant and the VFX department has done a fair job. Also, the comedy scenes had the theatre laughing out loud, and would definitely tickle the young and older audiences' funny bones." Abhimanyu Mathur of DNA India gave 3.5/5 stars and wrote "HanuMan is a brilliant, visually stunning effort from Prasanth Varma in blending mythology with the superhero genre."

Rishil Jogani from Pinkvilla gave 3.5/5 stars and wrote "HanuMan is the first surprise package of 2024 as director Prasanth Varma brings out his ambition to the big screen with utmost conviction. The film entertains with the right amount of drama, action, comedy, and devotional value. What holds attention apart from the vision of creating something magical is also the non-serious approach to the superhero tale." Bhargav Chaganti from NTV gave 3.5/5 stars and stated that "Hanuman – Goosebumps Guaranteed Film. Enjoy the festival with the whole family without any hindrance." Y Maheswara Reddy of Bangalore Mirror gave 3.5/5 stars and stated that Prashant Varma "has succeeded in aptly mixing mythology with social elements such as exploitation of the poor by the greedy and underdeveloped villages and the lifestyle of people in such villages. Computer-generated images are a visual treat for family as well as mass audiences, especially children."

Saki of Telangana Today wrote that "HanuMan is the best technically made film in recent times in Telugu. The music, visuals, VFX, and all other production elements totally shine in every episode." Sangeetha Devi Dundoo of The Hindu wrote that Director Prasanth Varma and actor Teja Sajja's superhero film blends the familiar good versus evil superpower template with a touch of devotion, and tops it with entertaining masala segments" Ram Venkata Srikar of Film Companion wrote that "Hanu Man is an inspiring start, It might just be the biggest surprise for Sankranthi."

=== Box office ===
Hanu-Man is the biggest Sankranthi hit in 92 years of Tollywood history. Hanu-Man broke several box-office records for a Telugu film. The film has grossed an estimated ₹350 crore (US$37 million), emerging as the tenth highest-grossing Indian film of 2024, fourth highest-grossing Telugu film of 2024 and eleventh highest-grossing Telugu film worldwide.

The film grossed ₹15 crore (US$1.6 million) on its opening day in India. HanuMan's Hindi version collected a net of ₹6.2 crore (US$660,000) in two days domestically. In its three days of theatrical run, the film grossed over ₹75 crore (US$8.0 million) worldwide, with ₹46.5 crore (US$5.0 million) from India. ₹12.26 crore (US$1.3 million) came from Hindi dubbed version alone in three days. The film grossed overwithin ₹100 crore (US$11 million) four days of its release.

Hanu-Man collected over ₹150 crore (US$16 million) in seven days. Hindi version grossed ₹22.5 crore (US$2.4 million) in a week of its release. It grossed ₹114.10 crore (US$12 million) in nine days run. The film grossed over ₹200 crore (US$21 million) in 10 days worldwide, with ₹132.05 crore (US$14 million) domestically. In 12 days of its theatrical run, the film grossed over ₹200.32 crore (US$21 million) worldwide. The film also collect a distributor share over ₹30 crore (US$3.2 million) in the Telangana in two weeks. Hanu-Man crossed ₹272.78 crore (US$29 million) worldwide, and Hindi version grossed over ₹45 crore (US$4.8 million) in 18 days of its release.

== Future ==
A sequel, titled Jai Hanuman, was announced in the end credits of the film. It was revealed that Hanuman would have more prominence than the character of Hanumanthu in the film. Varma announced that the sequel had commenced pre-production work on the occasion of the inauguration of the Ram Mandir, Ayodhya. Later, it was reported that Ram Charan was auditioned for the role of Rama in the sequel. On 30 October 2024, Rishab Shetty was announced to be portraying Hanuman.

Expanding the cinematic universe further, simultaneously with Hanu-Man, Varma announced the fourth film of the PVCU, Adhira, introducing the son of producer D. V. V. Danayya, Kalyan Dasari, basing on the powers of Indra. However, due to high response for Hanu-Man he decided to direct the sequel of Hanu-Man and recently a new director called Sharan Koppisetty (Kirrak Party fame (2018)) has announced for the film, Prasanth Varma penned the story and screenplay of the film. Recently the team has announced that actor director S.J. Suryah has playing an important role in the film. A film based on Goddess Mahakali, Mahakāli, was announced with Puja Kolluru of Martin Luther King (2023) fame as the director. Prasanth Varma penned the story and screenplay of the film with Riwaz Ramesh Duggal producing and RK Duggal presenting the film under RKD Studios. On 30 September 2025, Akshaye Khanna was announced to be playing Asuraguru Shukracharya. On 30 October 2025, Bhoomi Shetty was announced to be playing the titular character of Mahakali.

== Accolades ==
Award (Note: Awards, festivals and organizations are in alphabetical order.)	Date of ceremony (Note: Date is linked to the article about the awards held that year, wherever possible.)	Category	Recipient(s)	Result	Ref.
National Film Awards	23 September 2025	Best Film in AVGC	K. Niranjan Reddy (Producer), Prasanth Varma (Director) and Jetty Venkat Kumar (Animator)	Won	
National Film Awards	23 September 2025	Best Stunt Choreography	Nandu and Pruthvi Uppari	Won	
National Film Awards	23 September 2025	Best VFX Supervisor	Jetty Venkat Kumar	Won	
South Indian International Movie Awards	5 September 2025	Best Film – Telugu	K. Niranjan Reddy	Nominated	
South Indian International Movie Awards	5 September 2025	Best Director – Telugu	Prasanth Varma	Nominated	
South Indian International Movie Awards	5 September 2025	Best Cinematographer – Telugu	Dasaradhi Shivendra	Nominated	
South Indian International Movie Awards	5 September 2025	Best Actor – Telugu	Teja Sajja	Nominated	
South Indian International Movie Awards	5 September 2025	Best Supporting Actress – Telugu	Varalaxmi Sarathkumar	Nominated	
South Indian International Movie Awards	5 September 2025	Best Actor in a Negative Role – Telugu	Vinay Rai	Nominated	
South Indian International Movie Awards	5 September 2025	Best Comedian – Telugu	Getup Srinu	Nominated	
South Indian International Movie Awards	5 September 2025	Best Music Director – Telugu	Gowra Hari	Nominated	
South Indian International Movie Awards	5 September 2025	Best Lyricist – Telugu	Kasarla Shyam (for "Poolamme Pilla")	Nominated	
South Indian International Movie Awards	5 September 2025	Best Male Playback Singer – Telugu	Gowra Hari (for "Poolamme Pilla")	Nominated	
South Indian International Movie Awards	5 September 2025	Critics Best Actor – Telugu	Teja Sajja	Won	
South Indian International Movie Awards	5 September 2025	Critics Best Director – Telugu	Prasanth Varma	Won	

== See also ==
- List of Indian superhero films
