= SIIMA Award for Best Actor – Telugu =

Indian film award

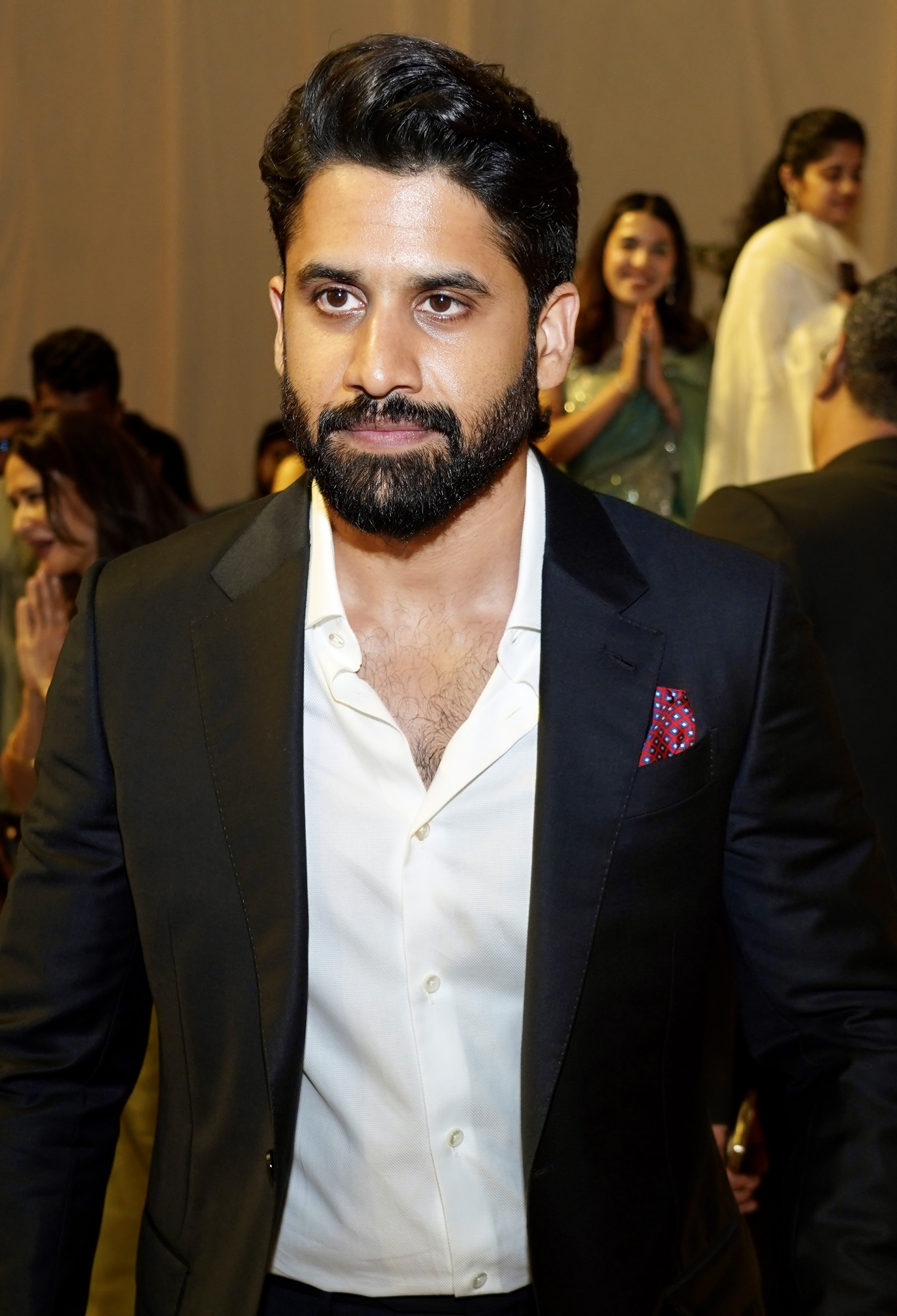
- The 2026 recipient: Naga Chaitanya
- Awarded for: Best Performance by an Actor in a Leading Role in Telugu cinema
- Country: India
- Presented by: Vibri Media Group
- First award: 21 June 2012 (for films released in 2011)
- Most recent winner: Naga Chaitanya, Thandel (2025)

Highlights
- Most awards: Mahesh Babu (4)
- Most nominations: Mahesh Babu (8)

SIIMA Award for Best Actor – Telugu is presented by Vibri media group as part of its annual South Indian International Movie Awards, for the best acting done by an actor in Telugu films. The award was first given in 2012 for films released in 2011. Mahesh Babu is the most nominated with eight nominations and most awarded with four wins.

== Superlatives ==
Categories	Recipient	Record
Most wins	Mahesh Babu	4
Most consecutive wins	Allu Arjun	2 (2020–2021)
Most nominations	Mahesh Babu	8
Most consecutive nominations	Mahesh Babu	5 (2011–2015)
Most nominations without a win	Dulquer Salmaan	3
Oldest winner	Nandamuri Balakrishna	Age 55 (4th SIIMA)
Youngest winner	N. T. Rama Rao Jr.	Age 34 (6th SIIMA)
Oldest nominee	Chiranjeevi	Age 69 (12th SIIMA)
Youngest nominee	Naga Chaitanya	Age 25 (1st SIIMA)

- Allu Arjun, Nani and Nandamuri Balakrishna have also won the SIIMA Critics Award for Best Actor – Telugu.
- Allu Arjun is the only actor to win the award consecutively, for Ala Vaikunthapurramuloo (2020) and Pushpa The Rise (2021).
- Mahesh Babu is the most awarded with 4 wins followed by Allu Arjun with 3 wins.

== Winners ==
Year	Winner	Film	Ref
2011	Mahesh Babu	Dookudu	
2012	Pawan Kalyan	Gabbar Singh	
2013	Mahesh Babu	Seethamma Vakitlo Sirimalle Chettu	
2014	Nandamuri Balakrishna	Legend	
2015	Mahesh Babu	Srimanthudu	
2016	N. T. Rama Rao Jr.	Janatha Garage	
2017	Prabhas	Baahubali 2: The Conclusion	
2018	Ram Charan	Rangasthalam	
2019	Mahesh Babu	Maharshi	
2020	Allu Arjun	Ala Vaikunthapurramuloo	
2021	Allu Arjun	Pushpa: The Rise	
2022	N. T. Rama Rao Jr.	RRR	
2023	Nani	Dasara	
2024	Allu Arjun	Pushpa 2: The Rule	
2025	Naga Chaitanya	Thandel	

== Nominations ==
- 2011: Mahesh Babu – Dookudu
  - Prabhas – Mr. Perfect
  - Naga Chaitanya – 100% Love
  - Nagarjuna – Rajanna
  - Nandamuri Balakrishna – Sri Rama Rajyam
- 2012: Pawan Kalyan – Gabbar Singh
  - Rana Daggubati – Krishnam Vande Jagadgurum
  - Mahesh Babu – Businessman
  - Nagarjuna – Shirdi Sai
  - Allu Arjun – Julayi
  - Ram Charan – Racha
- 2013: Mahesh Babu – Seethamma Vakitlo Sirimalle Chettu
  - Ram Charan – Naayak
  - Venkatesh – Seethamma Vakitlo Sirimalle Chettu
  - Pawan Kalyan – Attarintiki Daredi
  - Nithiin – Gunde Jaari Gallanthayyinde
  - Prabhas – Mirchi
- 2014: Nandamuri Balakrishna – Legend
  - Mahesh Babu – 1: Nenokkadine
  - Venkatesh – Drushyam
  - Naga Chaitanya – Manam
  - Allu Arjun – Race Gurram
- 2015: Mahesh Babu – Srimanthudu
  - Ram Charan – Bruce Lee: The Fighter
  - Nani – Bhale Bhale Magadivoy
  - Prabhas – Baahubali: The Beginning
  - Varun Tej – Kanche
- 2016: N. T. Rama Rao Jr. – Janatha Garage
  - Nithiin – A Aa
  - Venkatesh – Babu Bangaram
  - Nani – Krishna Gadi Veera Prema Gaadha
  - Ram Charan – Dhruva
- 2017: Prabhas – Baahubali 2: The Conclusion
  - Nandamuri Balakrishna – Gautamiputra Satakarni
  - Vijay Deverakonda – Arjun Reddy
  - N. T. Rama Rao Jr. – Jai Lava Kusa
  - Rana Daggubati – Nene Raju Nene Mantri
- 2018: Ram Charan – Rangasthalam
  - Mahesh Babu – Bharat Ane Nenu
  - N. T. Rama Rao Jr. – Aravinda Sametha Veera Raghava
  - Dulquer Salmaan – Mahanati
  - Vijay Devarakonda – Geetha Govindam
  - Sudheer Babu – Sammohanam
- 2019: Mahesh Babu – Maharshi
  - Ram Charan – Vinaya Vidheya Rama
  - Ram Pothineni – iSmart Shankar
  - Varun Tej – Gaddalakonda Ganesh
  - Nani – Jersey
  - Naveen Polishetty – Agent Sai Srinivasa Athreya
- 2020: Allu Arjun – Ala Vaikunthapurramuloo
  - Mahesh Babu – Sarileru Neekevvaru
  - Sudheer Babu – V
  - Satyadev – Uma Maheswara Ugra Roopasya
  - Nithiin – Bheeshma
- 2021: Allu Arjun – Pushpa: The Rise
  - Nandamuri Balakrishna – Akhanda
  - Naveen Polishetty – Jathi Ratnalu
  - Allari Naresh – Naandhi
  - Naga Chaitanya – Love Story
  - Nani – Shyam Singha Roy
- 2022: N. T. Rama Rao Jr. – RRR
  - Adivi Sesh – Major
  - Dulquer Salmaan – Sita Ramam
  - Nikhil Siddhartha – Karthikeya 2
  - Ram Charan – RRR
  - Siddhu Jonnalagadda – DJ Tillu
- 2023: Nani – Dasara
  - Nandamuri Balakrishna – Bhagavanth Kesari
  - Chiranjeevi – Waltair Veerayya
  - Dhanush – Sir
  - Sai Dharam Tej – Virupaksha
- 2024: Allu Arjun – Pushpa 2: The Rule
  - Dulquer Salmaan – Lucky Baskhar
  - N. T. Rama Rao Jr. – Devara: Part 1
  - Nani – Saripodhaa Sanivaaram
  - Prabhas – Kalki 2898 AD
  - Teja Sajja – Hanu-Man
- 2025: Naga Chaitanya – Thandel
  - Dhanush – Kuberaa
  - Nani – HIT: The Third Case
  - Pawan Kalyan – They Call Him OG
  - Teja Sajja – Mirai
  - Venkatesh – Sankranthiki Vasthunam

== See also ==
- SIIMA Critics Award for Best Actor – Telugu
- SIIMA Award for Best Male Debut – Telugu
