= Bandlaguda Jagir Municipal Corporation =

Local civic body in Bandlaguda Jagir, Telangana, India

Bandlaguda Jagir Municipal Corporation was the municipal corporation governing part of Indian city of Hyderabad, known as Bandlaguda Jagir. Municipal Corporation mechanism in India was introduced during British Rule with formation of municipal corporation in Madras (Chennai) in 1688, later followed by municipal corporations in Bombay (Mumbai) and Calcutta (Kolkata) by 1762. Bandlaguda Jagir Municipal Corporation was headed by Mayor of city and governed by Commissioner. It was merged into Greater Hyderabad Municipal Corporation in December 2025.

== History and administration ==
Bandlaguda Jagir Municipal Corporation was formed to improve the infrastructure of the town as per the needs of local population. Bandlaguda Jagir Municipal Corporation has been categorised into 22 wards and each ward is headed by councillor for which elections are held every 5 years.

Bandlaguda Jagir Municipal Corporation is governed by mayor Ms Latha Goud and administered by Municipal CommissionerVenugopal Reddy.

== Functions ==
Bandlaguda Jagir Municipal Corporationis created for the following functions:

- Planning for the town including its surroundings which are covered under its Department's Urban Planning Authority .
- Approving construction of new buildings and authorising use of land for various purposes.
- Improvement of the town's economic and Social status.
- Arrangements of water supply towards commercial, residential and industrial purposes.
- Planning for fire contingencies through Fire Service Departments.
- Creation of solid waste management, public health system and sanitary services.
- Working for the development of ecological aspect like development of Urban Forestry and making guidelines for environmental protection.
- Working for the development of weaker sections of the society like mentally and physically handicapped, old age and gender biased people.
- Making efforts for improvement of slums and poverty removal in the town.

== Revenue sources ==
The following are the Income sources for the Corporation from the Central and State Government.

=== Revenue from taxes ===
Following is the Tax related revenue for the corporation.

- Property tax.
- Profession tax.
- Entertainment tax.
- Grants from Central and State Government like Goods and Services Tax.
- Advertisement tax.

=== Revenue from non-tax sources ===
Following is the Non Tax related revenue for the corporation.

- Water usage charges.
- Fees from Documentation services.
- Rent received from municipal property.
- Funds from municipal bonds.
