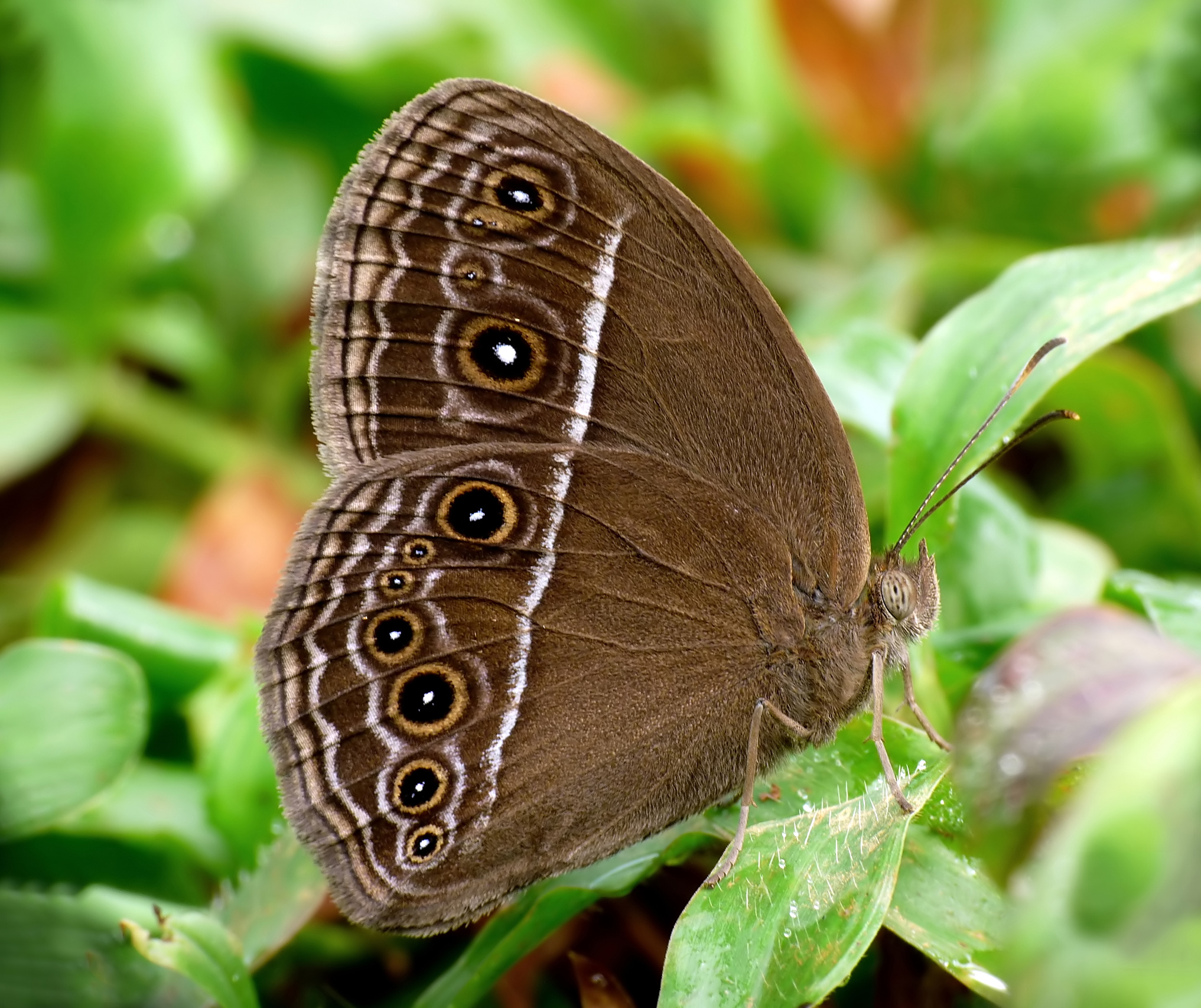
- Wet-season form in Maredumilli reserve, Rajahmundry district, Andhra Pradesh, India

Scientific classification
- Kingdom: Animalia
- Phylum: Arthropoda
- Clade: Pancrustacea
- Class: Insecta
- Order: Lepidoptera
- Family: Nymphalidae
- Genus: Mycalesis
- Species: M. perseus

Binomial name
- Mycalesis perseus (Fabricius, 1775)

= Mycalesis perseus =

Dingy bushbrown

Species of butterfly

Mycalesis perseus, the dingy bushbrown or common bushbrown, is a species of satyrine butterfly found in south Asia and southeast Asia.

== Description ==
Mycalesis perseus exhibits seasonal dimorphism with distinct wet-season and dry-season forms.

Wet-season form. Male and female. Upperside dark to somewhat pale vandyke-brown. Fore wing with a white-centred, fulvous-ringed, black ocellus in interspace 2, and rarely a very small but similar ocellus in interspace 5. Hind wing uniform, occasionally two or three postmedian obscure ocelli present. Fore and hind wings with subterminal and terminal pale lines. Underside: the groundcolour, subterminal and terminal lines on the wings as on upper-side, but crossed by a common purplish - white narrow discal fascia. Fore wing with from two to four, hind wing normally with seven ocelli, similar to, but more clearly defined than, the ocelli on the upperside; on both wings the line of ocelli bordered inwardly and outwardly by sinuous purplish-white lines. On the hind wing only the three posterior ocelli in a straight line, the rest strongly curved outwards. In the female the median or posterior ocellus on the upperside of the fore wing is always larger than in the male.

Dry-season form.- Male and female. Upperside similar to that in the wet-season form, the median ocellus generally smaller. Underside brown, more or less suffused with purple and irrorated with darker brown minute transverse strigae; the transverse discal band obscure, often merely indicated by black dots at the veins, occasionally bordered outwardly by an ochraceous diffuse band. Ocelli obsolescent, but when present as mere minute dots their arrangement on the hind wing is as in the wet-season form. Antennae, head, thorax and abdomen brown; antennae sometimes cinereous white on the sides with the apex black. Male sex-marks in form 2, but that on the underside of the fore wing small (about 2 into, long) and black.

Expanse 42–54 mm.

== Gallery ==
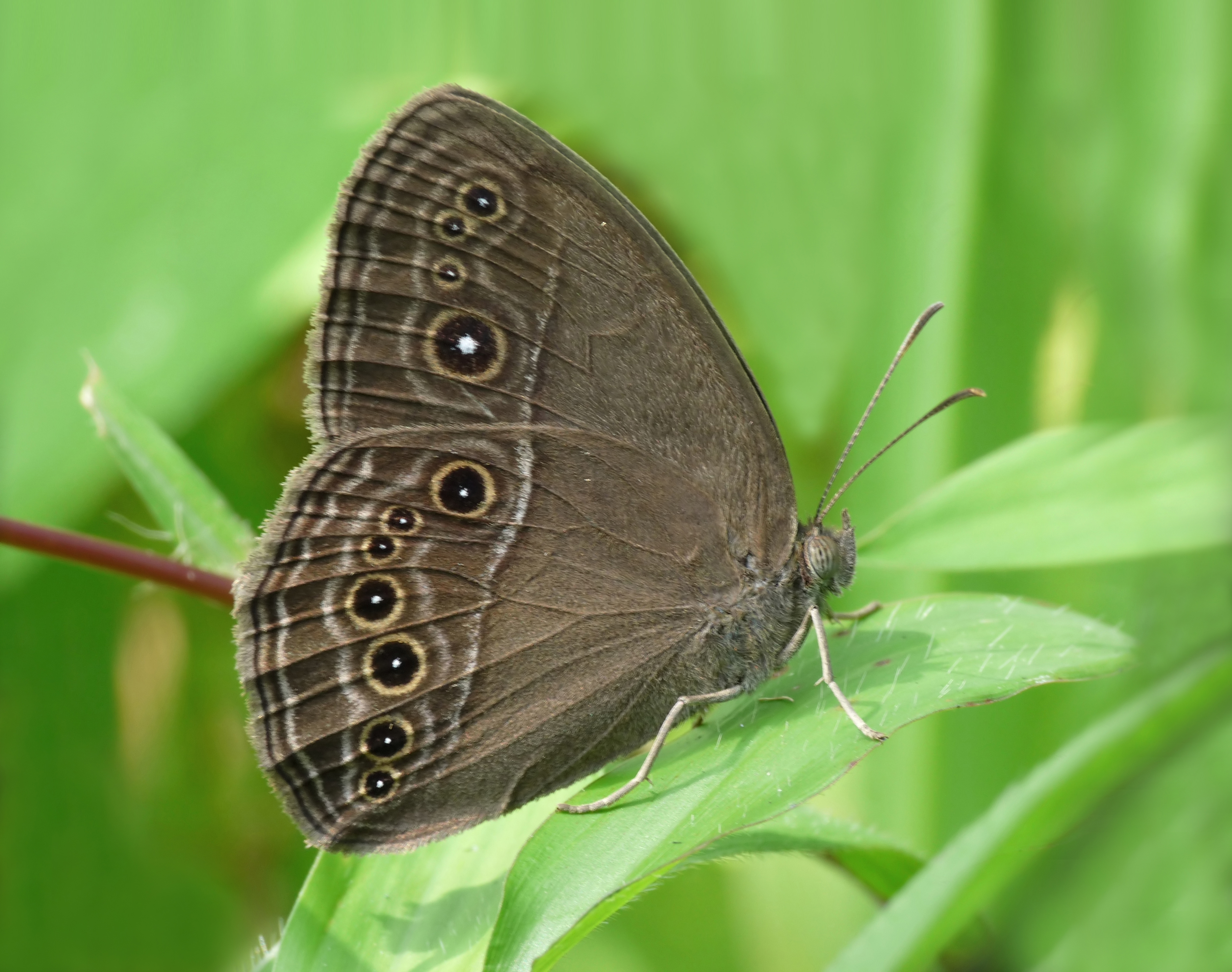
Wet-season form, Kerala

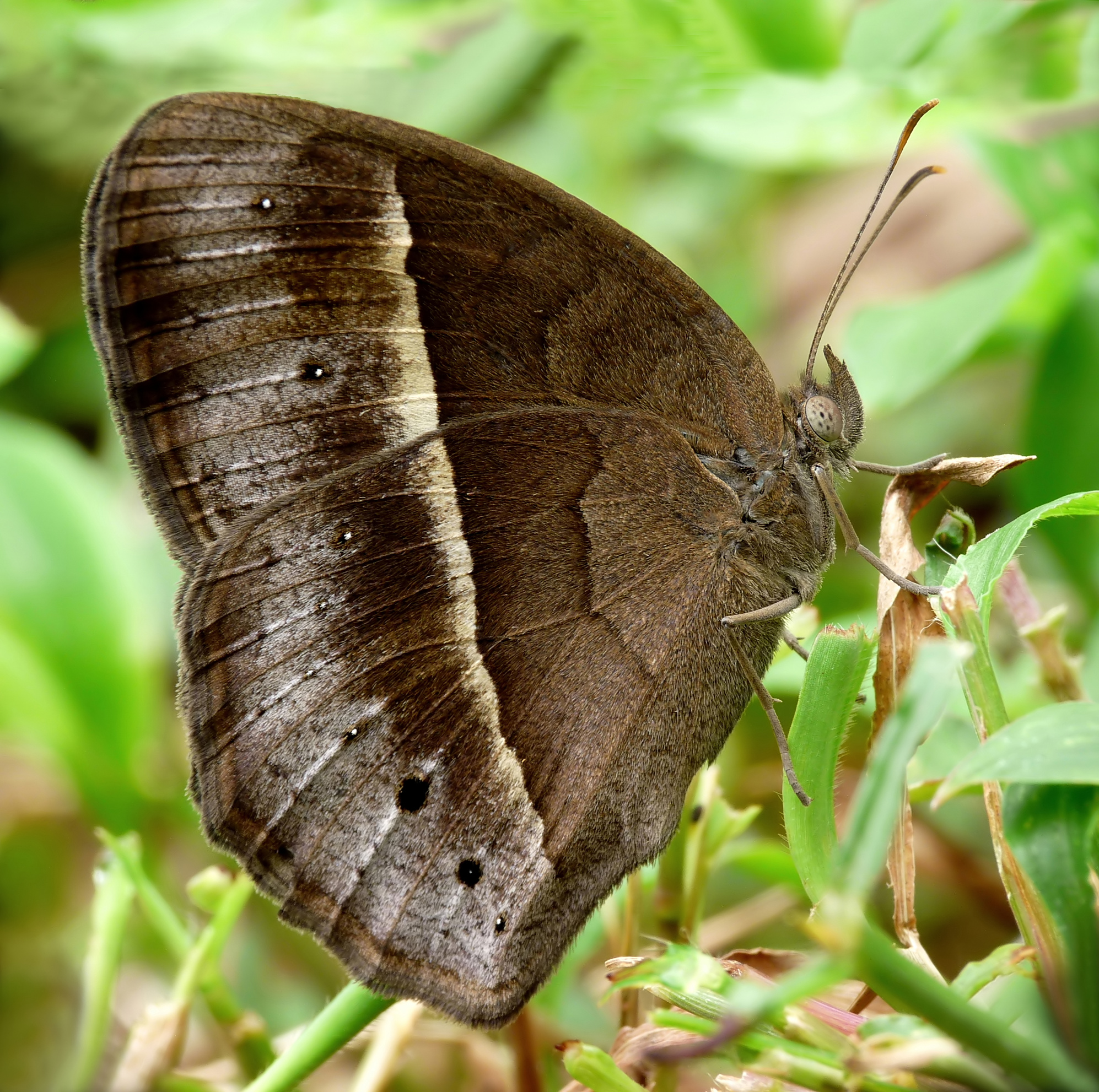
Dry-season form, Kerala

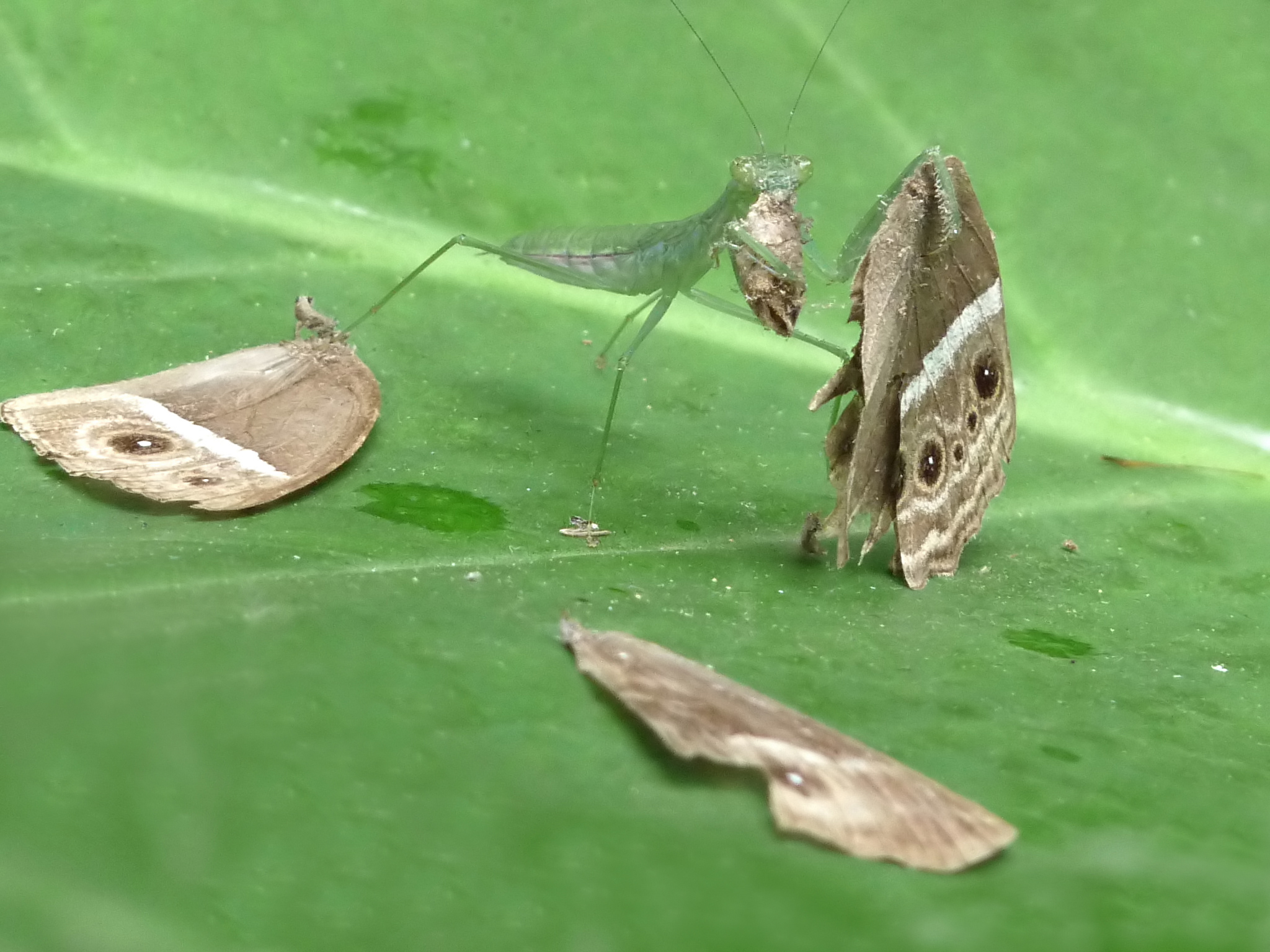
Mantis eating a common bushbrown

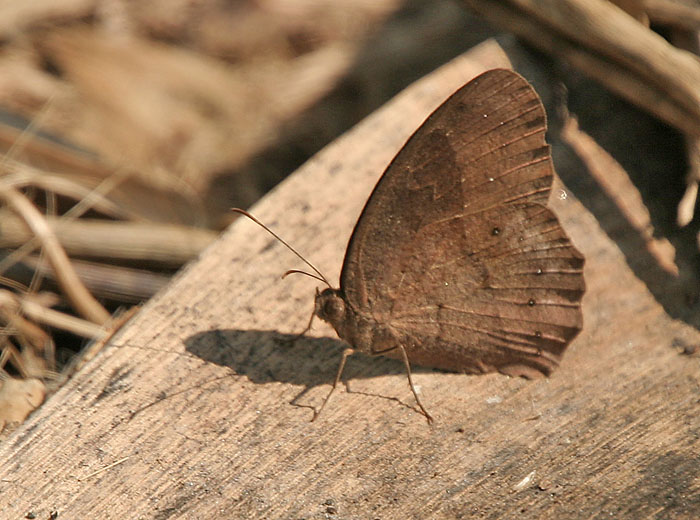
Dry-season form at Narendrapur near Kolkata, West Bengal, India

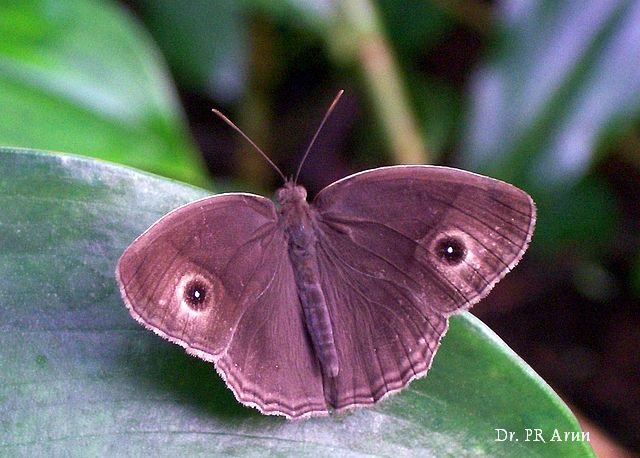
From above

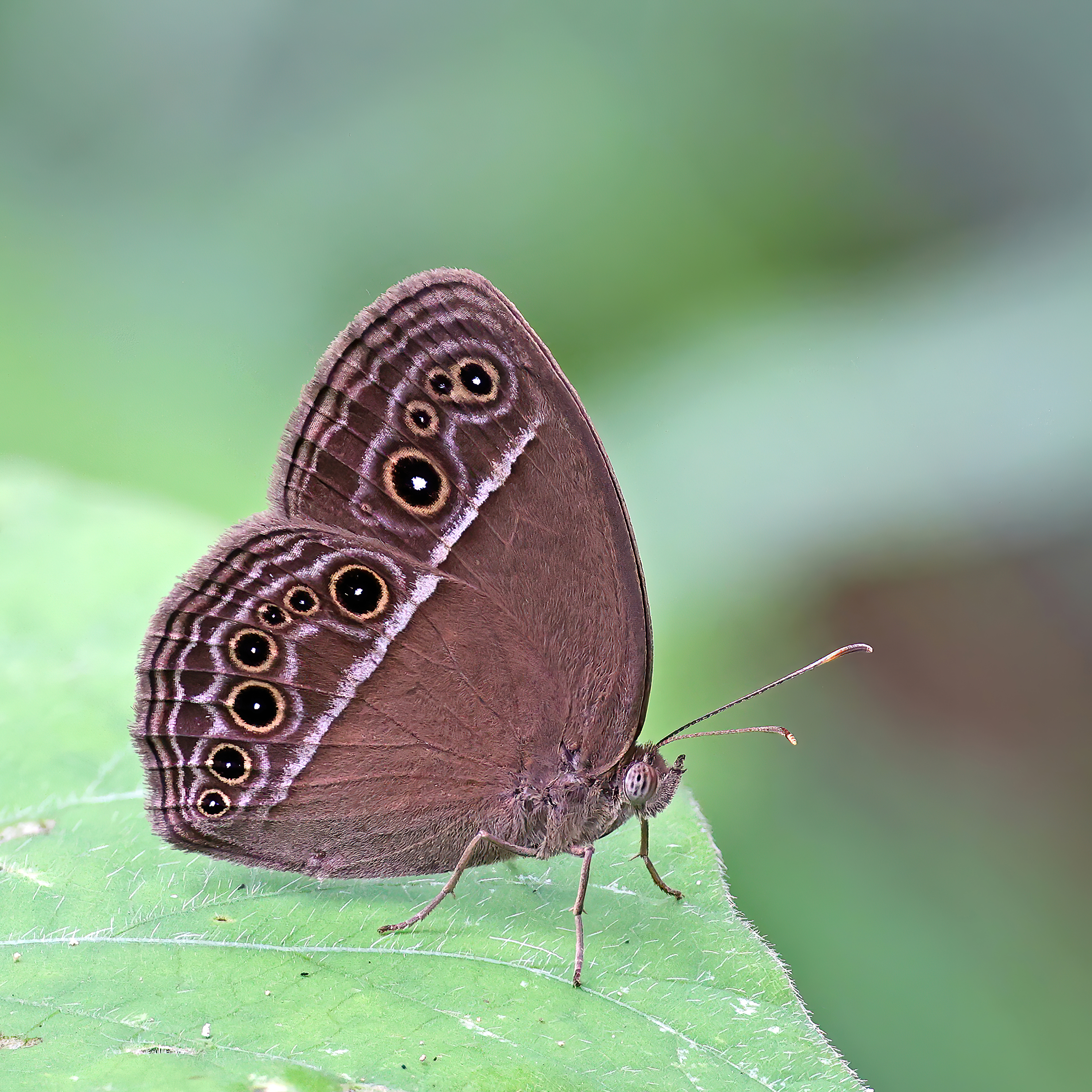
M. p. cepheus, Thailand

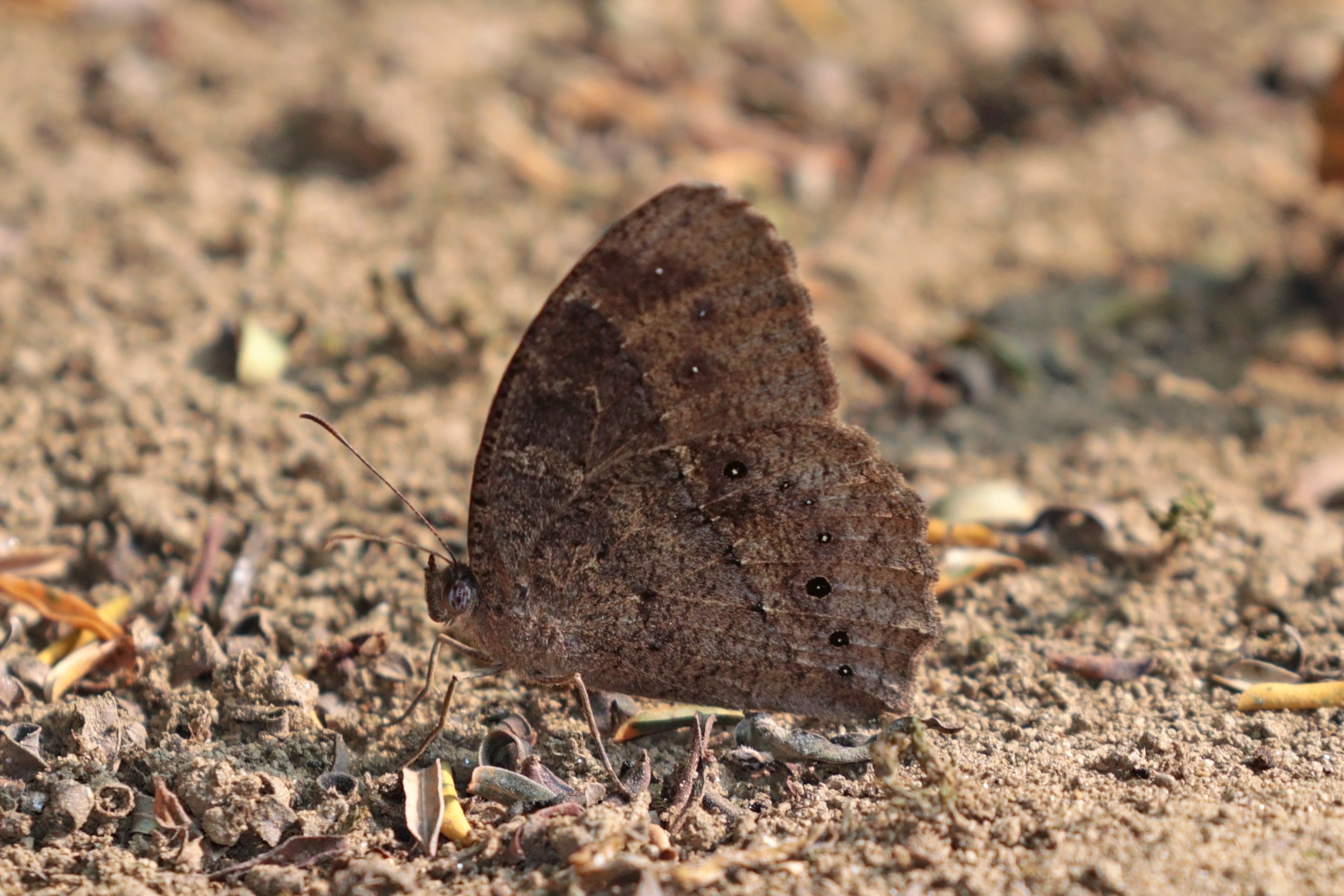
Himalayan common bushbrown (M. p. blasius) dry season form
