= SIIMA Critics Award for Best Actor – Telugu =

Telugu-language media award

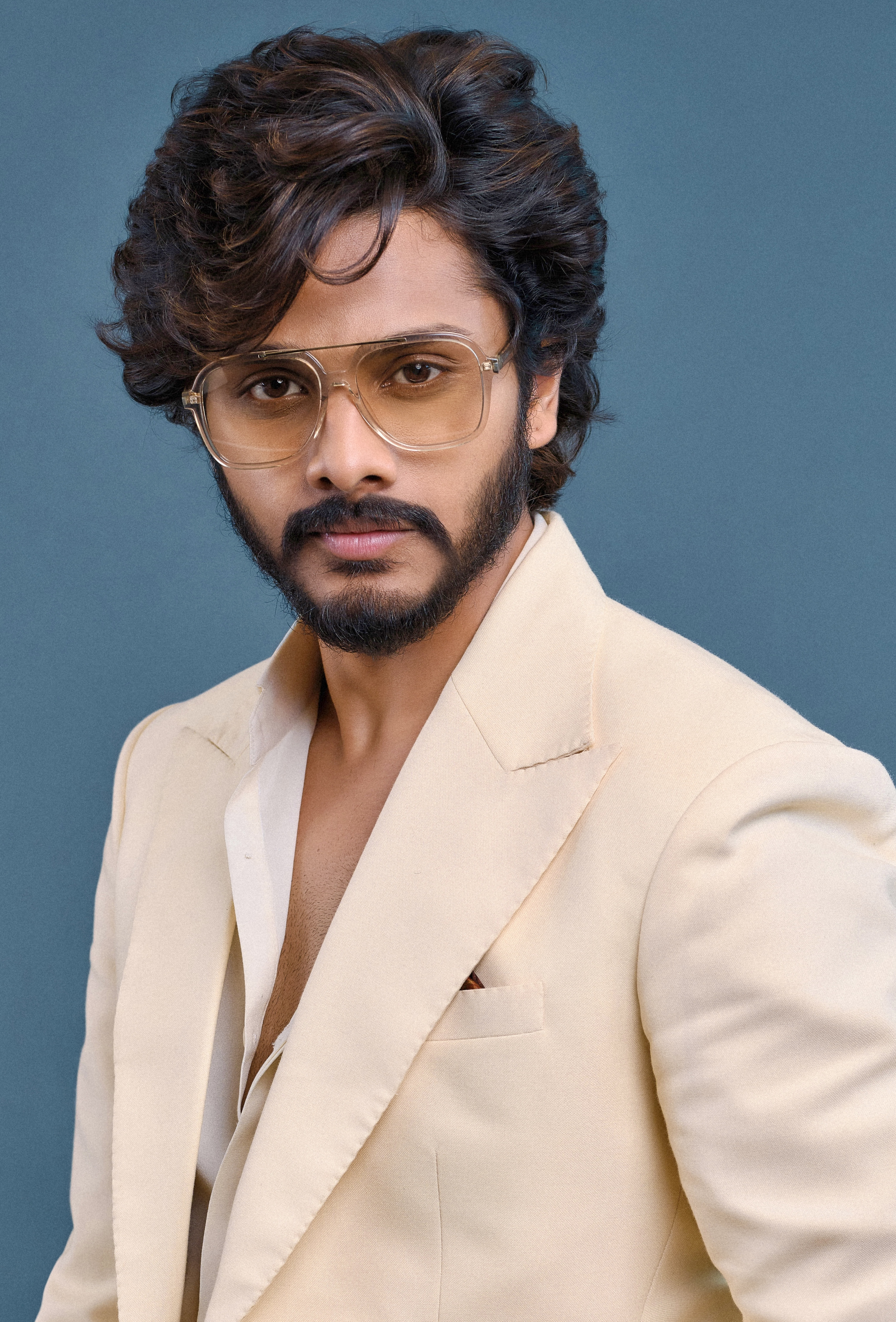
- The 2026 recipient: Teja Sajja
- Awarded for: Best Performance by an Actor in a Leading Role in Telugu cinema
- Country: India
- Presented by: Vibri Media Group
- First award: 21 June 2012 (for films released in 2011)
- Most recent winner: Teja Sajja, Mirai (2025)

Highlights
- Most wins: Nani and Teja Sajja (2)

SIIMA Critics Award for Best Actor – Telugu is presented by Vibri media group as part of its annual South Indian International Movie Awards, for best acting done by an actor in Telugu films, who are selected by the jury. The award was first given in 2012 for films released in 2011.

== Superlatives ==
Categories	Recipient	Record
Most wins	Nani	2
Most wins	Teja Sajja	2
Youngest winner	Teja Sajja	Age 30 (13th SIIMA)
Oldest winner	Nandamuri Balakrishna	Age 58 (7th SIIMA)

- Allu Arjun and Nandamuri Balakrishna have also won the SIIMA Award for Best Actor – Telugu.

== Winners ==
Year	Actor	Film	Ref.
2011	Nagarjuna	Rajanna	
2012	Rana Daggubati	Krishnam Vande Jagadgurum	
2013	No Award		
2014	Naga Chaitanya	Manam	
2015	Allu Arjun	Rudhramadevi	
2016	Nani	Krishna Gaadi Veera Prema Gaadha	
2017	Nandamuri Balakrishna	Gautamiputra Satakarni	
2017	Venkatesh	Guru	
2018	Vijay Deverakonda	Geetha Govindam	
2019	Nani	Jersey	
2020	Sudheer Babu	V	
2021	Naveen Polishetty	Jathi Ratnalu	
2022	Adivi Sesh	Major	
2023	Anand Deverakonda	Baby	
2024	Teja Sajja	Hanu-Man	
2025	Teja Sajja	Mirai	

== See also ==
- SIIMA Award for Best Actor – Telugu
- SIIMA Award for Best Male Debut – Telugu
