= National Film Award for Best Film in AVGC =

Indian film award

- National award for contributions to Indian Cinema
- Sponsored by: National Film Development Corporation of India
- Formerly called: National Film Award for Best Animated Film; National Film Award for Best Special Effects
- Rewards: Swarna Kamal (Golden Lotus) – ₹3,00,000; Rajat Kamal (Silver Lotus) – ₹2,00,000
- First award: 2022
- Most recent winner: Hanu-Man (2023)

The National Film Award for Best Film in AVGC (Animation, Visual Effects, Gaming, & Comic) is one of the National Film Awards presented annually by the National Film Development Corporation of India. It is one of several awards presented for feature films

The award was instituted for the 2022 awards, combining the previous National Film Award for Best Animated Film and National Film Award for Best Special Effects. There are three sub-categories: Animator, Producer and Director (shared), and VFX Supervisor. The first two sub-categories comes under Golden Lotus (Swarna Kamal) section for animation and the VFX Supervisor comes under the Silver Lotus (Rajat Kamal) for visual effects.

== Winners ==
Award includes 'Golden Lotus Award' (Swarna Kamal), 'Silver Lotus Award' (Rajat Kamal), and cash prize. Following are the award winners over the years:

List of award films, showing the year (award ceremony), language(s), animator(s), producer(s), director(s) and VFX Supervisor(s)
| Year | Film(s) | Language(s) | Animator(s) | Producer(s) and Director(s) | VFX Supervisor(s) | Refs. |
|---|---|---|---|---|---|---|
| 2022 (70th) | Brahmāstra: Part One – Shiva | Hindi | No Award | Producer: Dharma Productions, Prime Focus, and Starlight Pictures; Director: Ayan Mukerji | Jaykar Arudra, Viral Thakkar, and Neelesh Gore | |
| 2023 (71st) | Hanu-Man | Telugu | Jetty Venkat Kumar | Producer: Primeshow Entertainment; Director: Prasanth Varma | Jetty Venkat Kumar | |
| 2024 (72nd) | No Award | | | | | |
