= Teja Sajja =

Indian actor (born 1995)

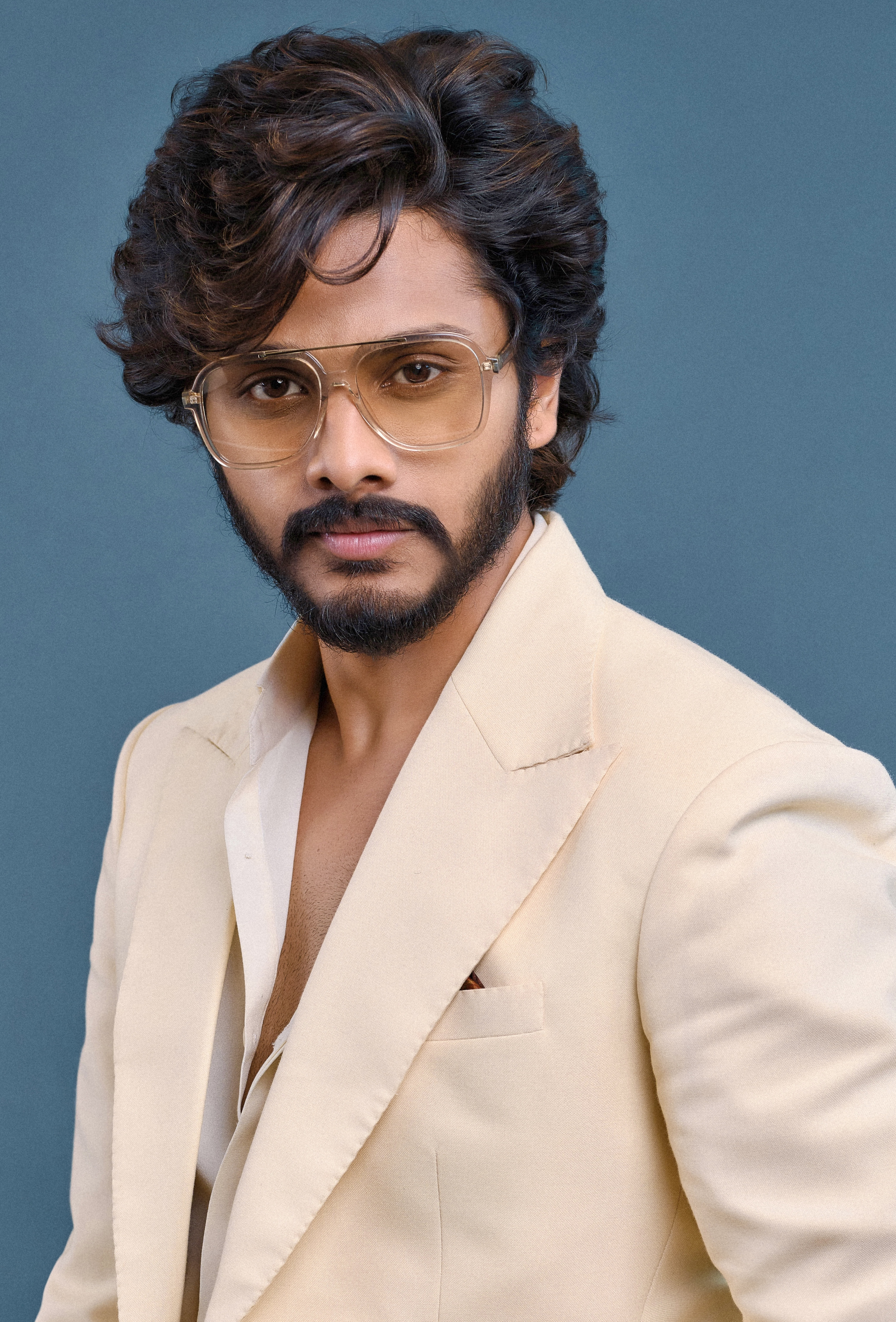
- Sajja at IIFA Utsavam
- Born: 23 August 1995 (age 31); India
- Education: Muffakham Jah College of Engineering and Technology, The Hyderabad Public School, Begumpet
- Occupation: Actor
- Years active: 1998–2009; 2019–present

Teja Sajja (born 23 August 1995) is an Indian actor who works in Telugu cinema. He began his career as a child actor in Choodalani Vundi (1998) leading up to Boss (2006). As an adult, Sajja had a supporting role in Oh! Baby (2019). He has since played the lead roles in films such as Zombie Reddy (2021), Hanu-Man (2024) and Mirai (2025). Hanu-Man is among the highest-grossing Indian films of 2024 and ninth highest-grossing Telugu film worldwide. He is a recipient of three SIIMA Awards and a Filmfare Award.

== Early life and career ==
Teja was born on 23 August 1995 in a Telugu family. Sajja made his debut at the age of two in Choodalani Vundi (1998) and acted in over 20 films alongside leading actors in Telugu cinema. These include Kalisundam Raa (2000), Yuvaraju (2000), Indra (2002), Tagore (2003), Gangotri (2003), Vasantam (2003), Samba (2004), Chatrapathi (2005), Balu (2005) with actors Chiranjeevi, Venkatesh, Prabhas, Mahesh Babu, Allu Arjun, N. T. Rama Rao Jr. and Pawan Kalyan.

Sajja then made a comeback and played a supporting role in Oh! Baby (2019). His made his debut in a lead role in Zombie Reddy (2021). It is the first zombie film in Telugu cinema and received positive reviews from critics. He also starred in Ishq: Not a Love Story alongside Priya Prakash Varrier which got mixed reviews. He completed his first sci-fi romantic film named Adbhutham alongside Shivani Rajashekar, which was released on Disney+ Hotstar, the same year. He next worked in the Prasanth Varma's superhero film Hanu-Man (2024). He recently starred in another superhero film titled Mirai, which was released on 12 September 2025.

== Filmography ==
Key
| † | Denotes films that have not yet been released |

| Year | Title | Role | Notes |
|---|---|---|---|
| 1998 | Choodalani Vundi | Anjala Zaveri's son | |
| 1999 | Rajakumarudu | Vengalla Rayudu | |
| 2000 | Kalisundam Raa | Sandeep | |
| 2000 | Yuvaraju | Teja | |
| 2000 | Bachi | Habibi | |
| 2001 | Deevinchandi | Siva's son | |
| 2001 | Prema Sandadi | Siddu Sidhartha Roy | |
| 2001 | Akasa Veedhilo | Ram and Lakshman | |
| 2002 | Indra | Young Indrasena Reddy | |
| 2003 | Gangotri | Young Simhadri | |
| 2003 | Ottesi Cheputunna | Young Surya | |
| 2003 | Vasantam | Young Ashok | Bilingual film; Shot in Telugu and Tamil |
| 2003 | Priyamaana Thozhi | Young Ashok | Bilingual film; Shot in Telugu and Tamil |
| 2003 | Tagore | Tagore's adopted son | |
| 2004 | Adavi Ramudu | Young Ramudu | |
| 2004 | Samba | Chinna | |
| 2004 | Leela Mahal Centre | Young Prabhu | |
| 2005 | Balu | Cherry | |
| 2005 | Naa Alludu | Young Chandram / Young Suryam | Dual role |
| 2005 | Andarivaadu | Govinda "Govindu" Raju Jr. | |
| 2005 | Chatrapathi | Young Ashok | |
| 2006 | Lakshmi | Young Lakshmi | |
| 2006 | Sri Ramadasu | Raghunathudu | |
| 2006 | Astram | Teja | |
| 2006 | Boss | Young GK | |
| 2009 | 7 Days In Slow Motion | Ravi | Debut as lead actor; English film |
| 2019 | Oh! Baby | Rama Krishna “Rocky” | Debut as adult actor |
| 2021 | Zombie Reddy | Marripalem "Mario" Obul Reddy | Debut as lead adult actor |
| 2021 | Ishq | Siddharth "Siddhu" | |
| 2021 | Adbhutham | Surya | |
| 2024 | Hanu-Man | Hanumanthu | |
| 2025 | Mirai | Vedha Prajapati | |
| 2027 | Zombie Reddy NXT LVL † | TBA | Filming |

=== Television ===
| Year | Title | Role | Network | Notes |
|---|---|---|---|---|
| 2024 | 3rd IIFA Utsavam | Host | Gemini TV | Television special |

== Awards and nominations ==
| Award | Year | Category | Work | Result | Ref. |
|---|---|---|---|---|---|
| Filmfare Awards South | 2026 | Best Actor – Telugu | Hanu-Man | Nominated | |
| Filmfare Awards South | 2026 | Critics Best Actor – Telugu | Hanu-Man | Won | |
| Sakshi Excellence Awards | 2022 | Jury Special Debutant Lead Actor of The Year | Zombie Reddy | Won | |
| South Indian International Movie Awards | 2022 | Most Promising Newcomer – Male | Zombie Reddy | Won | |
| South Indian International Movie Awards | 2022 | Best Male Debut – Telugu | Zombie Reddy | Nominated | |
| South Indian International Movie Awards | 2025 | Best Actor – Telugu | Hanu-Man | Nominated | |
| South Indian International Movie Awards | 2025 | Critics Best Actor – Telugu | Hanu-Man | Won | |
| South Indian International Movie Awards | 2026 | Best Actor | Mirai | Won | |
| South Indian International Movie Awards | | Critics Best Actor – Telugu | Mirai | Won | |
| Radio City Cine Awards Telugu | 2024 | Best Actor in a Leading Role | Hanu-Man | Won | |
