= Zombie Reddy =

2021 Indian zombie comedy film

- Theatrical release poster
- Directed by: Prasanth Varma
- Screenplay by: Scriptsville
- Story by: Prasanth Varma
- Produced by: Raj Sekhar Varma
- Starring: Teja Sajja; Anandhi; Daksha Nagarkar
- Cinematography: Anith Madadi
- Edited by: Sai Babu Talari
- Music by: Mark K. Robin
- Production company: Apple Trees Studios
- Distributed by: Geetha Arts; Siily Monks
- Release date: 5 February 2021
- Running time: 125 minutes
- Country: India
- Language: Telugu
- Budget: ₹4 crore
- Box office: ₹12 crore

Zombie Reddy is a 2021 Indian Telugu-language zombie comedy crime thriller film directed by Prasanth Varma and starring Teja Sajja, Anandhi, and Daksha Nagarkar. Produced by Apple Trees Studios, the film is marketed as the first zombie film in Telugu cinema. Set in the district of Kurnool, the film is partially based on COVID-19 pandemic. The film was released on 5 February 2021. Following its acquisition by Aha, it premiered on 26 March 2021.

== Plot ==
Mario, a game designer from Hyderabad, discovers a game-breaking glitch in his newly successful video game with his friends Bhadram and Maggie. To get the bug fixed, Mario travels to Kurnool for the wedding of his programmer, Kalyan, who is marrying Pushkala, daughter of Bhooma Reddy, a violent Rayalaseema chieftain locked in a bitter feud with rival factionist Veera Reddy. On the way, Mario accidentally runs over an infected man, who bites Bhadram.

As the wedding celebrations begin, Bhadram turns into a zombie and starts spreading the infection through the village. At the same time, Veera Reddy's men abduct Kalyan on his wedding night. Mario teams up with Nandini, a wedding guest, and Kasi Reddy, Bhooma Reddy's henchman, to rescue him. Infiltrating Veera Reddy's residence, Mario and Kasi discover that Nandini is actually Sailaja, Veera Reddy's daughter, sent to help orchestrate Kalyan's kidnapping. Mario also learns that the feud began when his own father, Pratap Reddy—Bhooma Reddy's brother—abandoned Veera Reddy's sister, Talambari, at their wedding to elope with another woman.

As the zombie outbreak escalates, Mario, Kalyan, Maggie, and Kasi flee Veera Reddy's residence, pursued by Sailaja and Veera Reddy. When Veera Reddy becomes trapped amid a zombie horde, a devastated Sailaja joins Mario's group to fight them off. Mario, Kalyan, and Sailaja manage to escape, but Maggie is infected by Bhadram and Kasi is left trapped behind.

Seeking answers, Mario traces the infected man who bit Bhadram to a hidden laboratory belonging to a disgraced virologist, who reveals that he created the zombie virus by accident while attempting to develop a COVID-19 vaccine. Before patient zero kills him, the virologist hints that the cure lies within a local sacred temple. Mario, Kalyan, a scratched Sailaja, and a surviving Bhooma Reddy head for the temple, where they find Veera Reddy hiding, still uninfected. Setting aside their long-standing feud, Bhooma Reddy and Veera Reddy join forces to hold back the encroaching horde while the others search for the cure.

At the temple, just as Sailaja begins to turn, Mario discovers that the divine water flowing through the temple's caves is the antidote. He lures the horde into the sacred pool, curing everyone infected, including Maggie and Bhadram. With the viral threat eliminated, the two rival families reconcile for good, hailing Mario as the hero who saved them all.

== Cast ==
- Teja Sajja as Marripalem Obul Reddy a.k.a. Mario
- Anandhi as Sailaja Reddy/Nandini Reddy (fake)
- Daksha Nagarkar as Maggie
- Kireeti Damaraju as Bhadram
- RJ Hemanth as Kalyan
- Getup Srinu as Kasi Reddy
- Lahari Shari as Pushkala Reddy, Kalyan's fiancée turned wife
- Vinay Varma as Bhooma Reddy, Pushkala's father
- Naga Mahesh as Veera Reddy, Sailaja's father
- Hari Teja as Talambari, Veera Reddy's sister
- Prudhvi Raj as Aagam Reddy, Veera Reddy's henchman
- Harsha Vardhan as Pratap Reddy, Mario's father
- Mamilla Shailaja Priya as Mario's mother
- Annapoorna as Pushkala's grandmother
- Vitta Mahesh as Masi Reddy
- Raghu Karumanchi as Veera Reddy's henchman
- Charandeep as Bhooma Reddy's henchman
- Raghu Babu as young Aagam Reddy(Cameo)
- Tripuraneni Chitti as Mad Scientist
- Keshav Deepak as Doctor
- Vijay Ranga Raju as Konda Reddy, Sailaja's grandfather
- Rupa Lakshmi as Bhooma Reddy's wife

== Production ==
The film was officially announced on 8 August 2020 by releasing a motion poster of the film. The film is Prasanth's third film after Awe and Kalki. The music is composed by Mark K. Robin who is known for his work in the 2019 film Agent Sai Srinivasa Athreya. The film is Sajja Teja's debut as a lead actor.

== Soundtrack ==
Zombie Reddy

Soundtrack album by Mark K. Robin
- Released: 5 February 2021 (Jukebox)
- Recorded: 2020–2021
- Genre: Feature film soundtrack
- Length: 15:48
- Language: Telugu
- Label: Aditya Music
- Producer: Mark K. Robin
External audio
- Audio Jukebox on YouTube

All music is composed by Mark K. Robin.

Track listing
No.	Title	Lyrics	Singer(s)	Length
1.	"GO Corona" (Chorus: P V N S Rohit, Hymath, Harika Narayan, Sahithi Chagunti, Sony Komanduri)	Mama Sing	Mama Sing, Sri Krishna, Anudeep	2:45
2.	"Zombie Reddy Theme" (Chorus: Anudeep Dev, PVNS Rohit, Raghuram Dronavajjala)	Mama Sing	Mama Sing	2:25
3.	"Burn Down"	Harika Narayan	Harika Narayan	1:27
4.	"Game of Life"	Mama Sing	Tharun Jain, Manmohan Raj, Mark K. Robin	3:15
5.	"Natu Kodi"	Nagendhara	Mark K. Robin	1:37
6.	"Mrithyunjaya"	Siva Shakthi Datta	Kaala Bhairava	4:15
Total length:				15:48

== Release ==
The film was released on 5 February 2021. It collected a gross of ₹2.26 crore (equivalent to ₹2.5 crore or US$260,000 in 2023) on its first day of release.

== Home media ==
The digital rights of the film were acquired by Aha, while the satellite rights were purchased by Star Maa. It was premiered on 28 March 2021, and registered an average TRP rating of 9.72.

== Reception ==
=== Critical response ===
Sangeetha Devi Dundoo of The Hindu wrote that "In one stroke, director Prasanth Varma juxtaposes different worlds — a pandemic looming large, zombies, Rayalaseema faction rivalry — to hilarious effect. Zombie Reddy is a satirical potpourri replete with pop culture references at every turn."

Neeshita Nyayapati of The Times of India stated "Zombie Reddy does have its moments, and all the cast, including Teja, Anandhi and Daksha, seem to have fun with what they're offered. This is not a bad film by any means, if only Prasanth had not gone down the predictable route, it would've been something more." Hemanth Kumar from Firstpost gave 3 out of 5 stars and stated "Zombie Reddy is the first zombie film in Telugu cinema and to its credit, it does a fairly good job in simplifying the storytelling to the bare essentials." A review from The Hans India rated the film 3 stars of 5 and wrote: "Zombie Reddy makes a decent attempt to entertain the audiences."

== Box office ==
The film collected a gross of ₹2.26 crore (equivalent to ₹2.5 crore or US$260,000 in 2023) on its first day of release.

== Sequel ==
A sequel to the film titled Zombie Reddy Nxt Lvl was announced in August 2026, with Teja Sajja reprising his role of zombie-slaying. Upendra and Shanaya Kapoor join the cast. The sequel to be directed by Suparn Verma will release in seven languages: Hindi, Telugu, Kannada, Tamil, Malayalam, Nepali and Japanese.
