= Superman (1980 film) =

1980 Indian film

- Theatrical release poster
- Directed by: V. Madhusudhana Rao
- Written by: Acharya Aatreya (dialogues)
- Screenplay by: V. Madhusudhana Rao
- Story by: R. K. Dharmaraju
- Based on: Superman (1978) by: Mario Puzo; David Newman; Leslie Newman; Robert Benton; Richard Donner
- Produced by: R. Gopal
- Starring: N. T. Rama Rao; Jaya Prada
- Cinematography: K. S. Prasad
- Edited by: D. Venkataratnam
- Music by: Chakravarthy
- Production company: Lakshmi Vishnu Productions
- Release date: 10 July 1980
- Running time: 134 minutes
- Country: India
- Language: Telugu

Superman is a 1980 Indian Telugu-language superhero film directed by V. Madhusudhana Rao. The film stars N. T. Rama Rao and Jayaprada in lead roles. Produced by R. Gopal under the Lakshmi Vishnu Productions banner, the film features a musical score by Chakravarthy. It is an unofficial Indian adaptation of the 1978 American film Superman.

== Plot ==
Zamindar Raghunath Rao, a devout worshipper of Hanuman, offers his family's heirloom jewelry during Hanuman Jayanthi. Meanwhile, three villains—Maharaj, Sardar, and Jaisingh—rob and murder Raghunath Rao, his wife Annapurna, and the temple priest. Their son, Raja, undertakes severe penance, and Hanuman grants him supernatural powers, transforming him into a superhero.

Years later, Raja uses his powers discreetly to help the public while concealing his true identity. He starts a mining business with Bangarayya and falls in love with Bangarayya's daughter, Jaya. The three villains, now involved in criminal activities, pose a threat to the region. Raja first eliminates Jaisingh, then discovers Maharaj's attempt to exploit gold deposits in the mine by creating a fake demon threat. Raja confronts and defeats Sardar.

Raja’s foster sister, Lakshmi, falls in love with Mohan, Maharaj's son, and becomes pregnant. Raja proposes marriage, but Maharaj, discovering Raja’s secret identity, seizes the dowry and escapes with Mohan. Lakshmi, in despair, attempts suicide but is saved by Raja.

Raja travels to Hong Kong, where Bangarayya and Jaya follow him. Maharaj, having lured them there, tries to sell the mine and also seeks to kill Raja with the help of a sorceress, Lee. However, her black magic proves ineffective. Raja ultimately identifies Maharaj as the third villain, defeats him, retrieves Mohan, and marries Lakshmi. The film concludes with Raja and Jaya’s marriage, bringing the story to a joyous end.

== Cast ==
- N. T. Rama Rao as Raja / Superman
  - Master Raju as young Raja
- Jaya Prada as Jaya
- Satyanarayana as Maharaj Dharma Rao
- Allu Ramalingaiah as Bangarayya
- Kanta Rao as Raghunatha Rao
- Tyagaraju as Jai Singh
- Chakarapani as Mohan
- Arja Janardhan Rao as Lord Hanuman
- Srilanka Manohar as Sardar
- Pandari Bai as Sarada
- Geetha as Lakshmi
- Annapurna as Annapurnamma
- Jayamalini as Lee
- Malashri (credited as Baby Durga) as Raja's sister

== Music ==
Superman

Film score by K. Chakravarthy
- Released: 1980
- Genre: Soundtrack
- Length: 25:16

The music for Superman was composed by Chakravarthy, with lyrics written by Acharya Aatreya and Veturi.

No.	Title	Singer(s)	Length
1.	"Mabbullo Chandramma"	S. P. Balasubrahmanyam, P. Susheela	6:10
2.	"Atta Sudamaaka"	S. P. Balasubrahmanyam, P. Susheela	3:23
3.	"Chinuku Chitikesindhi"	S. P. Balasubrahmanyam, P. Susheela	2:55
4.	"Kotalo Paaga"	S. P. Balasubrahmanyam, P. Susheela	3:26
5.	"Kannu Kotteyyana"	S. P. Balasubrahmanyam, P. Susheela	3:04
6.	"Methani Kougita"	S. P. Balasubrahmanyam, P. Susheela	4:30
7.	"Sri Anjaneya"	P. Susheela	4:48
Total length:			25:16

== See also ==
- List of Indian superhero films
