= Maredumilli mandal =

- Mandal
- Interactive map of Maredumilli mandal
- Country: India
- State: Andhra Pradesh
- District: Polavaram
- Population according to 2011 census: 19,507
- Number of villages: 71
- Area in Sq Km: 913.96
- Headquarters: Maredumilli
- Time zone: UTC+5:30 (IST)

Maredumilli mandal is one of the 12 mandals in Polavaram district of Andhra Pradesh. Its headquarters is the village of Maredumilli. At the time of the 2011 census there were 71 villages in this mandal.

== Demographics ==
Maredumilli mandal had a total population of 19,507 at the time of the 2011 census out of which 10,166 were male while 9,341 were female, with an average sex ratio of 919. The total literacy rate of Maredumilli mandal was 59%.

== Towns & Villages ==
=== Villages ===
- 1. Addarivalasa
- 2. Akumamidikota
- 3. Arjunalova
- 4. Banda
- 5. Bhimavaram
- 6. Bodlanka
- 7. Boduluru
- 8. Busigandi
- 9. Chakkavada
- 10. Chatlavada
- 11. Chavidikota
- 12. D Velamalakota
- 13. Daravada
- 14. Denduluru
- 15. Devarapalle
- 16. Dorachintalapalem
- 17. Doramamidi
- 18. Egavalasa
- 19. Elivada
- 20. Goguvalasa
- 21. Gondivada
- 22. Goramamidi
- 23. Gudisa
- 24. Gujjumamidivalasa
- 25. Gumpenagandi
- 26. Gundrathi
- 27. Ijjaluru
- 28. Ivampalle
- 29. Kadumuru
- 30. Kakuru
- 31. Katchalavada
- 32. Kondavada
- 33. Kuduru
- 34. Kundada
- 35. Kutravada
- 36. Maddiveedu
- 37. Madduluru
- 38. Mallavaram
- 39. Maredumilli
- 40. Muchilivada
- 41. Munjamamidi
- 42. Munthamamidi
- 43. Musuru
- 44. Narsapuram
- 45. Nellore
- 46. Nukaletivada
- 47. Nurupudi
- 48. Pamulamamidi
- 49. Pamuleru
- 50. Pandirimamidikota
- 51. Pedamallupadu
- 52. Peddamarri
- 53. Pedduru
- 54. Potlavada
- 55. Pujaripakalu
- 56. Pullangi
- 57. Pusiwada
- 58. Puttagondilanka
- 59. Ramannavalasa
- 60. Siripanlova
- 61. Sripuram
- 62. Sunnampadu
- 63. Thadepalle
- 64. Thurruru
- 65. Thurumamidi
- 66. Vakkuluru
- 67. Valamuru
- 68. Vetukuru
- 69. Vuthaluru
- 70. Vyadapudi

== See also ==
- List of mandals in Andhra Pradesh
