= Kalki (2019 Telugu film) =

2019 film by Prashanth Varma

Rajashekar's Kalki
- Theatrical release poster
- Directed by: Prasanth Varma
- Written by: Prasanth Varma
- Story by: Saitej Desharaj
- Produced by: C. Kalyan
- Starring: Rajasekhar; Rahul Ramakrishna; Adah Sharma; Nandita Swetha; Pujita Ponnada; Siddhu Jonnalagadda
- Cinematography: Dasaradhi Sivendra
- Edited by: Goutham Nerusu
- Music by: Shravan Bharadwaj
- Production companies: Happy Movies; Shivani Shivathmika Movies; White Lamb Talkies
- Release date: 28 June 2019
- Running time: 140 minutes
- Country: India
- Language: Telugu

Rajashekar's Kalki is a 2019 Indian Telugu-language action thriller film directed by Prasanth Varma from a story written by Saitej Desharaj and produced by C. Kalyan. The film stars Rajasekhar, Rahul Ramakrishna, Adah Sharma, Nandita Swetha, Siddhu Jonnalagadda and Pujita Ponnada, while Nassar, Ashutosh Rana, Jayaprakash, and Shatru play supporting roles. The music was composed by Shravan Bharadwaj with cinematography by Dasaradhi Sivendra and editing by Goutham Nrusu. The film released on 28 June 2019.

== Plot ==
In 1947, Razakars attack Hindu provinces on behalf of the Nizam of Hyderabad. Kollapur's ruler, Raja Balakishan Rao, is betrayed and killed by his commander Narsappa. Following Hyderabad's integration into India, Narsappa seeks political power, but Balakishan's widow, Rani Ramachandramma, wins the elections and establishes local infrastructure. Taking advantage of a rift between royal confidant Raja Ratnam and his son Perumaallu, Narsappa loots the treasury and sets fire to the palace, seemingly killing Rani Ramachandramma, Raja Ratnam, and the former's child before establishing an iron-fisted rule as MLA.

In 1983, journalist Deva Dutta investigates the turbulent history of Kollapur just as Narsappa's soft-hearted brother, Sekhar Babu, is found murdered inside a burned liquor store and hung from a tree. Suspecting Perumaallu with whom he had a fallout, Narsappa launches a violent search, while IPS officer Kalki arrives to investigate. Collaborating with Dutta, Kalki discovers that a previous staged attempt on Sekhar Babu's life used poison from a rare snake native to Nagulakona, a village recently destroyed by wildfire. Visiting Nagulakona, Kalki deduces that the village was scorched to facilitate Narsappa's red sandalwood smuggling operations. Meanwhile, Narsappa abducts a tribal girl named Paalapitta, who delays his advances using tactics, and Kalki deals with tension involving his former lover Dr. Padma, whose father he killed during an anti-Maoist operation.

Kalki and Dutta uncover Sekhar Babu's secret romance with Asima Khan, whose family fled Kollapur after a boat massacre was falsely blamed on her. Her father reveals that the sole eyewitness to the massacre, a saint named Sambasivudu, refuses to testify. Kalki realises Sambasivudu is actually Raja Ratnam, who survived the palace fire. When Narsappa attempts to kill Asima, Kalki saves her. Investigating the assassin who previously tried to kill Sekhar Babu, Kalki discovers that Sekhar Babu was secretly complicit in Narsappa's atrocities, including the boat massacre. During a confrontation with Narsappa's gang, Sambasivudu is fatally wounded protecting Kalki, declaring before dying that karma is driving these events.

Kalki apprehends the gang, exposes Paalapitta as an undercover police officer, and arrests Narsappa. Perumaallu ambushes and kills Narsappa, but Kalki shoots Perumaallu dead in return. In the aftermath, at the hospital where Kalki is being treated for his wounds, Asima reveals to Padma that Kalki himself executed Sekhar Babu and his friends when they attempted to molest Asima after she uncovered his crimes. Overhearing the conversation, Dutta connects the final pieces and discovers that Kalki was covertly deployed by the department to eliminate Narsappa and Perumaallu, and he was the one who incited Perumaallu to kill Narsappa. When Kalki's mother arrives to see him, Dutta identifies her as Rani Ramachandramma, making Kalki the long-lost heir to the royal family of Kollapur.

As Kalki departs Kollapur alongside his mother and Padma, Dutta makes sense of Sambasivudu's final words.

== Cast ==
- Rajasekhar as Kalki IPS
- Rahul Ramakrishna as Reporter Deva Dutta
- Adah Sharma as Dr. Padma
- Nandita Swetha as Asima Khan
- Pujita Ponnada as SI Palapitta
- Siddu Jonnalagadda as Sekhar Babu
- Nassar as Sambasivudu /Raja Rathnam
- Ashutosh Rana as Narsappa
- Jayaprakash as Adv. Kabir Khan
- Shatru as Perumaallu
- Charandeep as SI Yadgiri
- Devi Prasad as Padma's father
- Gautam Raju as Doctor
- Venugopal
- Vennela Ramarao
- DS Rao
- Amith Sharma
- Sathish (Bunty)
- Scarlett Melish Wilson as an item number "Horn Pom Pom Okay Please"

== Production ==
After the success of Awe (2018), Rajasekhar expressed interest to act under the direction of Prasanth Varma. Prasanth decided to do a commercial film as his second venture because he did not want to be typecasted. The original story with twists was written by Saitej Desharaj in a web-series format, following which, Prasanth had to adapt the original story into a screenplay for the format of a feature film. This process took eight months to finish.

== Soundtrack ==
The soundtrack was composed by Shravan Bharadwaj.

| No. | Title | Singer(s) | Length |
|---|---|---|---|
| 1. | "Horn Pom Pom OK Please" | Lalitha Kavya | 3:33 |
| 2. | "Evaro Evaro" | Hemachandra, Shweta Mohan | 2:59 |

== Release ==
Kalki opened to mixed reviews from the critics. The Times of India gave the film three out of five stars and stated that the film is "worth a watch" and although "the film isn't as suspenseful as they come, it still keeps things entertaining till the end". Sangeetha Devi Dundoo of The Hindu wrote "There's an element of surprise towards the end, but the journey towards it is tedious". Hemanth Kumar of Firstpost wrote "Although Kalki finds its mojo in bits and pieces, it tries hard to whip up emotion where there's none, and ends up as a big bore". 123Telugu wrote "On the whole, Kalki is an investigative thriller ".
