= Vattinagulapally =

- Village
- Interactive map of Vattinagulapally
- Country: India
- State: Telangana
- District: Ranga Reddy
- Metro: Ranga Reddy district

Government
  - Body: Municipal Administration

Languages
  - Official: Telugu
- Time zone: UTC+5:30 (IST)
- Postal code: 500075
- Vehicle registration: TS
- Planning agency: Narsingi Municipality
- Civic agency: Municipal Administration
- Website: telangana.gov.in

Vattinagulapally is a village and panchayat converted to Municipality under newly formed Narsingi Municipality in Ranga Reddy district, Telangana, India. Earlier this village was part of Rajendranagar mandal. Due to district reorganisation, it fell under the newly formed Gandipet mandal on 11 October 2016.
