= Glendale Academy =

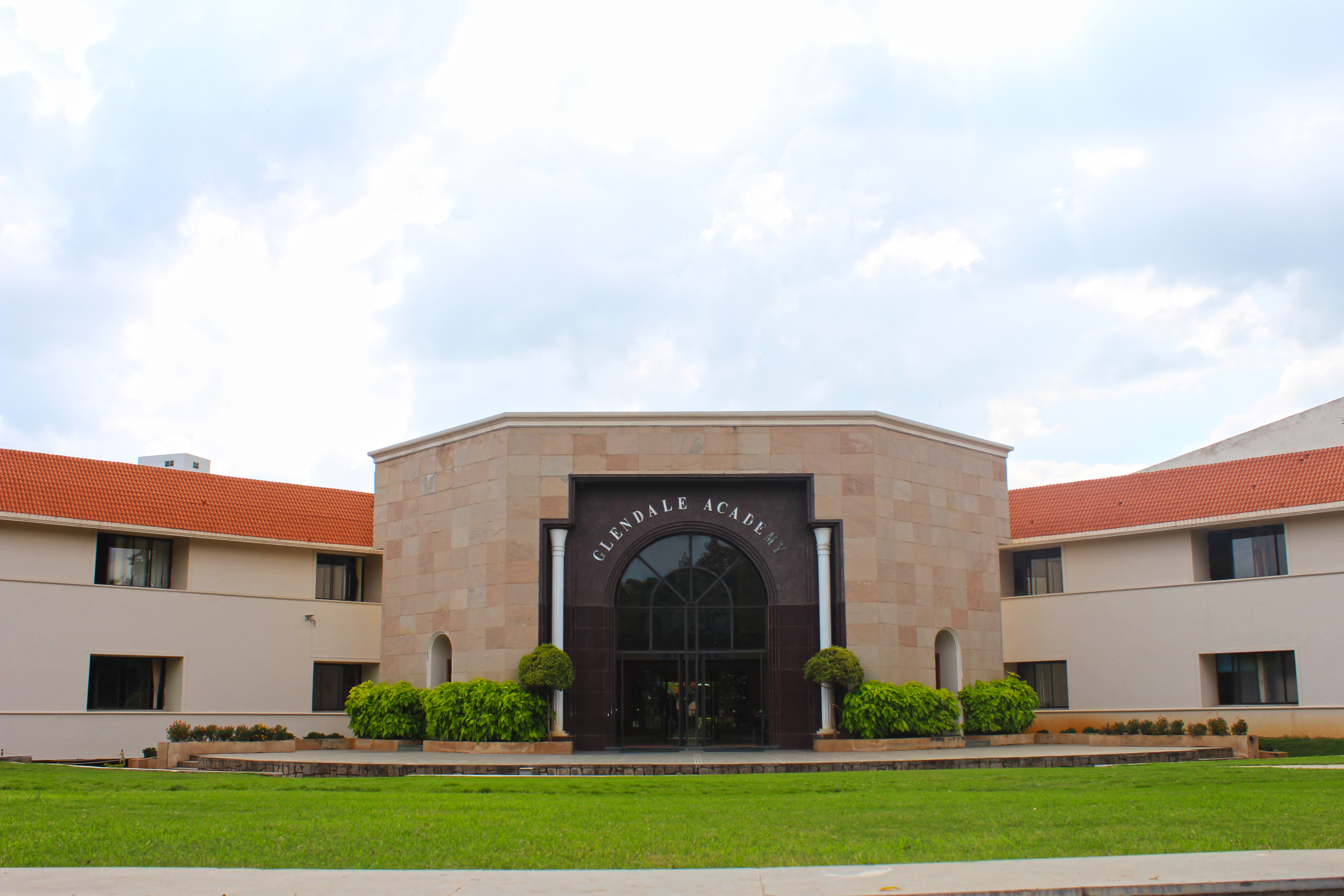
- Sun City, Hyderabad; India

Information
- Type: High School
- Motto: "Sow a thought, reap a destiny"
- Principal: Trilok Singh Bist
- Grades: LKG to 12
- Campus type: 10 acres

Glendale Academy is a high school located in Sun City, Telangana, Hyderabad, India. The school was founded by Anjum Babukhan to be a blend of both the Indian and Western educational systems.

== History ==
It was founded by Anjum Babukhan in 2003. Anjum served as the director until 2023. In 2023, it was acquired by Global Schools Foundation.

== Organisation ==
The school is affiliated with the Central Board of Secondary Education, India. It is an International school.

== Campuses ==
It has three campuses.
