= Prasanth Varma =

Indian filmmaker (born 1989)

- Born: 29 May 1989 (age 37); Palakollu, Andhra Pradesh, India
- Occupations: Film director; screenwriter
- Years active: 2011–present
- Spouse: Sukanya Raju

Prasanth Varma Penmetsa is an Indian film director and screenwriter who works in Telugu cinema. He is best known for directing Awe (2018), Kalki (2019), Zombie Reddy (2021) and Hanu-Man (2024). The lattermost is his highest-grosser and has won the National Film Award for Best Film in AVGC. He is also the co-founder of Scriptsville, an organization dedicated to supporting screenwriting in Telugu cinema.

== Early life ==
Prasanth Varma was born on 29 May 1989 in Palakollu, Andhra Pradesh in a Telugu family, to Narayana Raju, a civil contractor, and Kanaka Durga, a government school teacher. He has a younger sister, Sneha Sameera. He attended Sri Saraswathi Sisu Mandir in Palakollu, where his education included an extra subject focusing on stories from the Itihasas, such as the Ramayana, Mahabharata, and Bhagavatham.

After completing his schooling, he graduated from CVR College of Engineering in 2010. Varma's passion for mythological stories is shared by his younger sister, Sneha Sameera, who is also part of his Scriptsville team. He married Sukanya Raju in 2020.

== Career ==
=== 2011–2017: Early career ===
Prasanth Varma began his career in 2011 by directing a short film Deenamma Jeevitham. He then directed ad films and a few short films, including A Silent Melody (2014) and Dialogue in the Dark (2017). In 2015, he directed a five-episode web series, Not Out, starring Brian Lara, which premiered on YuppTV. In an interview with Idlebrain.com, Prasanth Varma named Singeetam Srinivasa Rao as his biggest inspiration, admiring how he never repeated himself in his work. He is also influenced by Christopher Nolan, K. Viswanath, and Mani Ratnam.

=== 2018–present: Directorial debut and critical acclaim ===
In 2017, Prashanth Varma presented the storyline of Awe to actor Nani, securing its production through Wall Poster Cinema alongside Prashanti Tipirneni. Released in 2018, the film marked his directorial debut and garnered acclaim for its subversive depiction of psychological and social issues, including child abuse, sexual abuse, and drug abuse. Critics, including Baradwaj Rangan, praised his narrative and direction, with special emphasis on the portrayal of lesbian characters in the movie. The film's success also highlighted Varma's ability to effectively integrate visual effects into storytelling, a skill he honed through hands-on experience in his early career.

Following Awe, Varma continued to explore diverse genres. His next release, Kalki (2019), starring Rajasekhar and produced by C. Kalyan, was originally conceived as a web series. However, Varma adapted the screenplay into a feature film format, a process that took eight months. Kalki received mixed reviews from critics.

Prasanth Varma's third release was Zombie Reddy (2021), originally scheduled for 2020 but delayed due to the COVID-19 lockdown in India. Marketed as the first zombie film in Telugu, it received positive reviews and performed well at the box office. Sangeetha Devi Dundoo of The Hindu wrote that "In one stroke, director Prasanth Varma juxtaposes different worlds—a pandemic looming large, zombies, Rayalaseema faction rivalry—to hilarious effect"

On 29 May 2021, he announced his next film Hanu-Man. The film is marketed as the first Telugu Superhero film. Starring Teja Sajja as Hanumanthu and Amritha Aiyer as Meenakshi, the film was released on 12 January 2024, coinciding with Sankranti. It served as the first installment of the Prasanth Varma Cinematic Universe (PVCU), inspired by Indian mythology. The film received highly positive reviews for its direction, screenwriting, performances, visualization, background score, VFX, production design and action sequences. With a global box office gross of over ₹350 crore, it became the tenth highest-grossing Telugu film of all time.

=== Scriptsville ===
In 2018, Prasanth Varma founded Scriptsville with his sister Sneha Sameera to enhance screenwriting in Telugu cinema. Scriptsville aims to help new and unrecognized writers gain recognition and proper credit.

The idea for Scriptsville came from Prasanth's understanding of the industry's need for professional script development and writer recognition. After the success of his debut film Awe, Prasanth and Sameera launched Scriptsville to offer a platform for both emerging and established writers. They invited writers to submit their ideas and received over a thousand submissions, from which a few promising stories were chosen for development. Initially, Scriptsville began with ten writers—five full-time and five working remotely or part-time.

Scriptsville has played a role in developing several scripts, including those for Prasanth's film Kalki. The organization assists with dialogues, screenplay structure, and solving script issues. They also plan to sell scripts to directors and producers to promote quality writing.

As of May 2023, Scriptsville continues to work on new films and web series, advancing its goal to improve screenwriting in Telugu cinema.

== Filmography ==
Key
†	Denotes films that have not yet been released

List of feature film credits
Year	Title	Director	Screenplay	Story	Notes	Ref.
2018	Awe	Yes	Yes	Yes	Feature film debut	
2019	Kalki	Yes	Yes	No		
2021	Zombie Reddy	Yes	Yes	Yes		
2021	Adbhutham	No	No	Yes		
2024	Hanu-Man	Yes	No	Yes	1st installment in the PVCU	
2024	Devaki Nandana Vasudeva	No	No	Yes		
2027	Mahākali †	No	No	Yes	2nd installment in the PVCU	
2027	Zombie Reddy: NXT LVL †	No	No	Yes		

Other works

List of other film credits
Year	Title	Notes
2011	Deenamma Jeevitham	Directorial debut
2014	A Silent Melody	
2017	Dialogue in the Dark	

=== Television ===
Year	Title	Role	Network	Ref.
2015	Not Out	Director / Creator	YuppTV	
2024	The Mystery of Moksha Island	Writer	Disney+ Hotstar	
