= Mirai (2025 film) =

2025 Indian film by Karthik Gattamneni

- Theatrical release poster
- Directed by: Karthik Gattamneni
- Written by: Karthik Gattamneni
- Screenplay by: Manibabu Karanam
- Produced by: T. G. Vishwa Prasad; Krithi Prasad
- Starring: Teja Sajja; Manchu Manoj; Jagapathi Babu; Jayaram; Shriya Saran; Ritika Nayak
- Cinematography: Karthik Gattamneni
- Edited by: A. Sreekar Prasad
- Music by: Gowra Hari
- Production company: People Media Factory
- Distributed by: see below
- Release date: 12 September 2025
- Running time: 169 minutes
- Country: India
- Language: Telugu
- Budget: ₹60 crore
- Box office: ₹141–150 crore

Mirai is a 2025 Indian Telugu-language fantasy action-adventure film written and directed by Karthik Gattamneni. Produced by TG Vishwa Prasad and Krithi Prasad for People Media Factory, the film stars Teja Sajja, Manchu Manoj, Jagapathi Babu, Jayaram, Shriya Saran and Ritika Nayak in important roles.

Mirai was released worldwide on 12 September 2025 to positive reviews from critics who praised the film's acting and visual effects, but criticised the humour and emerged as a commercial success at the box office and emerged as fourth-highest grossing Telugu film of 2025. A sequel titled Mirai: Jaithraya is in development.

== Plot ==
Vedha Prajapati is a young orphan who indulges in pickpocketing for his livelihood. Vibha, a sanyasi whom Vedha is trying to woo, makes him realise that he is the prophesied protector of the nine sacred scriptures or granthas of Emperor Ashoka. After the Kalinga War, Emperor Ashoka turned his powers into the nine granthas, which possess the power to turn mortals into deities. The Black Sword, a ruthless group led by Mahabir Lama, seeks to claim the granthas and plunge the world into darkness. He succeeds in capturing eight of the nine granthas, becoming immensely powerful in the process. However, he fails to attain the ninth and most powerful of the granthas, Amaragrandha. His quest for it clashes with Vedha, who is revealed to be the son of the protector of the same grandha, Ambika Prajapati. To kill Mahabir Lama, Vedha then realises that he must attain the divine superweapon of Mirāi, which is later revealed to be the Kodanda of Lord Ram. The rest of the story unfolds as Vedha embarks on a journey to wield Mirāi, including encountering the divine eagle Sampati, who is protecting the Mirāi, along with understanding his true identity and purpose. In the mid-credits scene, a mysterious man is introduced. He is revealed to have the power of Midas touch. He becomes obsessed with the powers of Mirāi, after learning about Mahabir Lama's death. Then he vows to seek the superweapon for his own enrichment and also states 'I will deliver the justice that was refused in Treta Yuga in this modern age', possibly hinting at a sequel.

== Cast ==
- Teja Sajja as Vedha Prajapati
- Manchu Manoj as Mahabir Lama / Black Sword
  - Karthikeya Dev as young Mahabir
- Jagapathi Babu as Angama Bali
- Jayaram as Agasthya Muni "AG"
- Shriya Saran as Ambika Prajapati, Vedha's mother
- Ritika Nayak as Vibha, Vedha's love interest
- Raj Zutshi as Banshi
- Tanja Keller as Yuca, Mahabir's henchwoman
- Rathna Shekar Reddy as Kyza
- Getup Srinu as Memesh, Vedha's companion
- Pawan Chopra as K. N. Bagchi
- Raghu Ram as Dasu Daddy
- Sunil Thapa as Gyan Purja
- Kishore Tirumala as CI Ashok
- Venkatesh Maha as Vikram
- Gaurav Bora as Lord Rama
- Manoj Dugireddy as Ashoka
- Sai Krishna Reddy as Sridhar
- Madee Manepalli as Mapu
- Viva Raghava as Sebastian
- Muskaan Arora as Zoya
- Anji Valguman as Hola
- Manik Reddy as Mitai
- Niranjan Kolanu as Kamba
- Bunny Arumalla as Lateef
- Badal Bhatta as Karikaludu
- Killi Kranthi as Lalu Chaubey
- Prabhas as the narrator (voiceover)
- Rana Daggubati as a mysterious man with Midas touch (cameo appearance)

== Production ==
=== Development ===
Mirai was officially announced on 18 April 2024 with a title promo. It was initially planned for release on 18 April 2025 but was postponed. The budget reportedly increased from ₹30–40 crore to about ₹60 crore, owing to extensive VFX and plans for a pan-India release.

=== Filming ===
Filming took place at Ramoji Film City, Sri Lanka and other Hyderabad locations, with night shoots for talkie portions concluding in December 2024.

== Music ==
Mirai

Soundtrack album by Gowra Hari
- Released: 2025
- Recorded: 2024–2025
- Genre: Feature film soundtrack
- Language: Telugu
- Label: Tips Music
- Producer: Gowra Hari

Gowra Hari chronology
Hanu-Man (2024)	Mirai (2025)

The soundtrack is composed by Gowra Hari, following his success with Hanu-Man (2024). The first single, "Vibe Undi" sung by Armaan Malik, was released in July 2025. The second single, "Jaithraya" sung by Shankar Mahadevan, was released on 8 September 2025.

Track listing
No.	Title	Lyrics	Singer(s)	Length
1.	"Rudhira Magadha"	Karthik Gattamneni	Sai Charan Bhaskaruni, Chaithu Satsangi, Harshavardhan Chavali	0:59
2.	"Vibe Undi"	Krishna Kanth	Armaan Malik	3:23
3.	"Jaithraya"	Chandrabose	Shankar Mahadevan	2:56
4.	"The Mother Song"	Gowra Hari	Harini Ivaturi, Saicharan Bhaaskaruni, Chaitu Satsangi, Harshavardhan Chavali	2:11
5.	"Sri Raama Sambhavam"	Gowra Hari	Chorus	2:25
6.	"The Black Sword Anthem"	Gowra Hari	Saicharan Bhaskaruni	1:24
Total length:				13:18

== Marketing ==
The first-look poster was released on 18 April 2024. A teaser launched on 28 May 2025 introduced the mythical setting and visual scale. The trailer was released on 28 August 2025.

== Release ==
=== Theatrical ===
The film initially scheduled for a release on 18 April 2025. It was announced with first glimpse of the movie but was delayed due to production delays, eventually released theatrically worldwide on 12 September 2025. Mirai Released in Japan in August 21st 2026.

=== Distribution ===
Mythri Movie Makers acquired the Nizam distribution rights. Dharma Productions acquired the North India distribution rights. AGS Entertainment and Hombale Films acquired the Tamil Nadu and Karnataka distribution rights, respectively, while Sree Gokulam Movies acquired the distribution rights for Kerala.

=== Home media ===
The film began streaming on JioHotstar from 10 October 2025 in Telugu and dubbed versions of Tamil, Kannada and Malayalam languages. Later, the Hindi version began streaming on the platform from 7 November 2025.

== Reception ==
The Times of India gave the film 3.5 stars out of 5, praising the performances, visuals, action sequences and cinematography, while feeling the screenplay faltered at times, the comedic detours slowed down the pacing, and that the climax was predictable. Reviewing the Hindi version, Bollywood Hungama gave the film 3 stars out of 5 and praised the story, direction, performances and cinematography, while remarking that the screenplay failed to make the desired impact, and that the humour did not land properly. Neeshita Nyayapati from Hindustan Times found the production design and visual effects impressive, but was critical of the humour and the way it was blended with the seriousness of the proceedings. Sangeetha Devi Dundoo from The Hindu felt that while the film was ambitious in reframing an Indian superhero saga, it struggled to anchor its spectacle in compelling storytelling.

== Accolades ==
Award (Note: Awards, festivals and organizations are in alphabetical order.)	Date of ceremony (Note: Date is linked to the article about the awards held that year, wherever possible.)	Category	Recipient(s)	Result	Ref.
Indian National Cine Academy Awards	2026	Best Film- Telugu	T.G Viswa Prasad	Won	
Indian National Cine Academy Awards	2026	Best VFX	People Media Factory VFX, Deccan Dreams	Won	
