= Maredumilli =

- Village
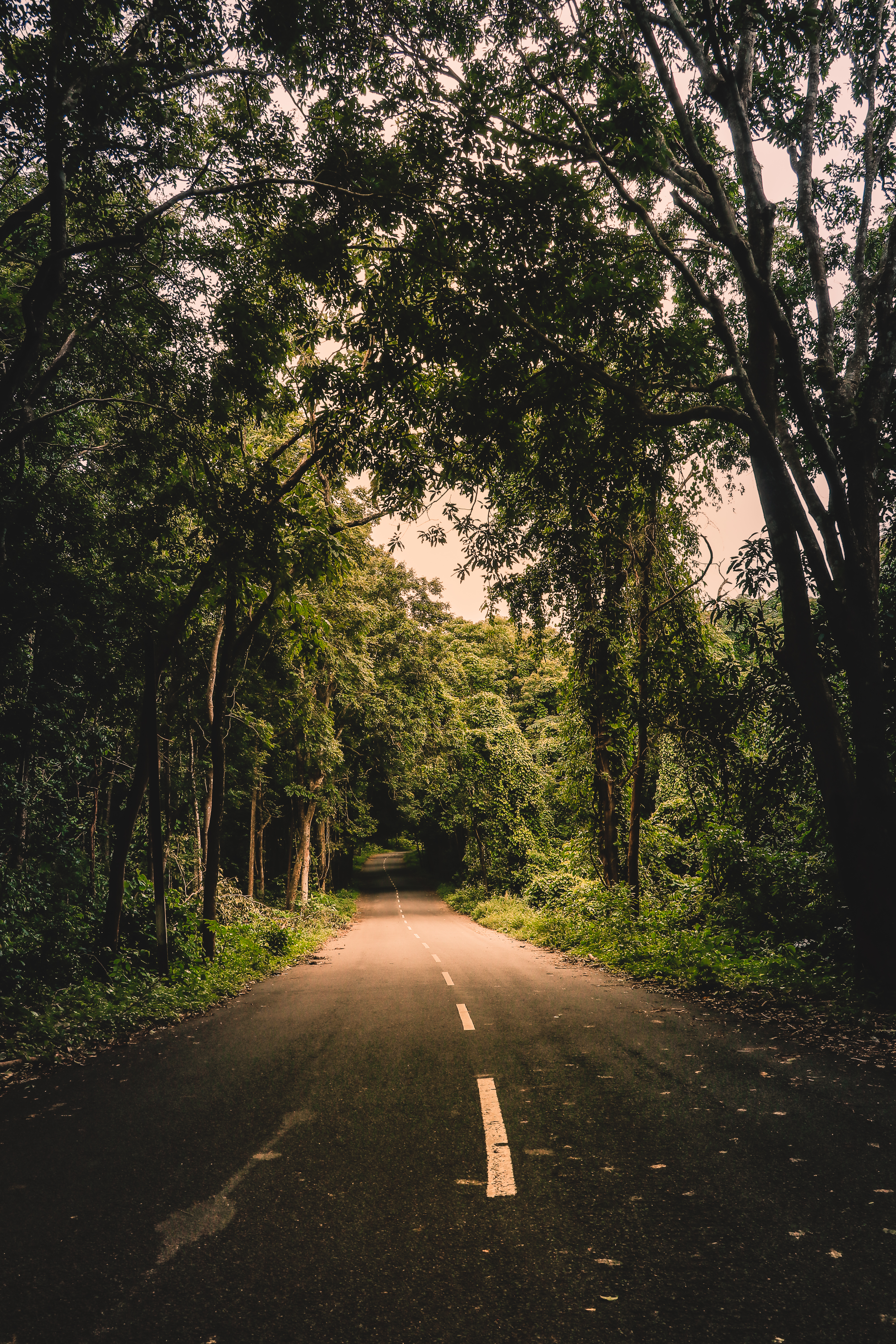
- Road leading to Maredumilli
- Interactive map of Maredumilli
- Location in Andhra Pradesh, India
- Coordinates: 17.3541°N 81.4243°E
- Country: India
- State: Andhra Pradesh
- District: Polavaram
- Mandal: Maredumilli

Area
  - Total: 913.96 km^{2} (352.88 sq mi)
  - Rank: 2 rank

Languages
  - Official: Telugu
- Time zone: UTC+5:30 (IST)
- Postal Index Number: 533295
- Vehicle Registration: AP-05, AP-06 (Former); AP-39 (from 30 January 2019)

Maredumilli is a village in Polavaram district in the state of Andhra Pradesh in India. It is the mandal headquarters of Maredumilli mandal. It is 90 km from Rajamahendravaram. It has many waterfalls and beautiful locations. Over the years, it has become a popular location for various films and television shows.
