= Hydershakote =

- Village
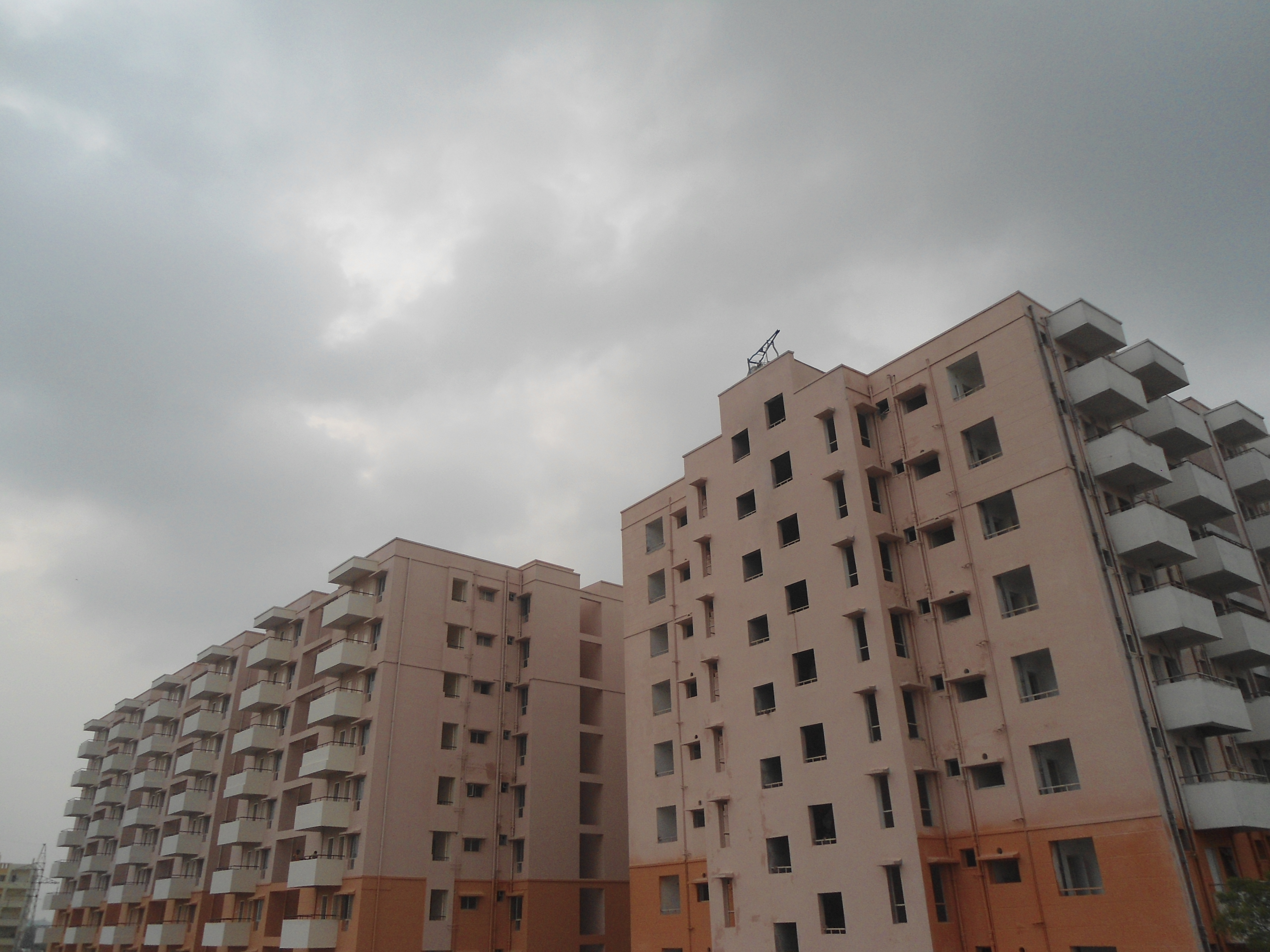
- New Residential Complex at Hydershakote
- Country: India
- State: Telangana
- District: Rangareddy
- Metro: Rangareddy

Government
  - Body: Mandal Office

Languages
  - Official: Telugu
- Time zone: UTC+5:30 (IST)
- Vehicle registration: TS
- Planning agency: Municipality
- Civic agency: Mandal Office
- Website: telangana.gov.in

Hydershakote is a village and municipality in Rangareddy district, Telangana, India. It falls under Gandipet mandal.
