= Bandlaguda Jagir =

- suburb
- Nickname: Bandlaguda
- Location in Hyderabad, India Bandlaguda Jagir (India)
- Coordinates: 17.354334°N 78.385295°E
- Country: India
- State: Telangana
- District: Rangareddy district
- Metro: Hyderabad

Government
  - Type: Municipal Corporation
  - Body: Bandlaguda Jagir Municipal Corporation

Languages
  - Official: Telugu
- Time zone: UTC+5:30 (IST)
- PIN: 500086
- Lok Sabha constituency: Chevella
- Vidhan Sabha constituency: Rajendra Nagar
- Planning agency: Hyderabad Metropolitan Development Authority

Bandlaguda Jagir is a satellite city of Hyderabad and a municipal corporation in Rangareddy district, Telangana, India, under Gandipet mandal of Rajendranagar revenue division.
