= 3 Roses (TV series) =

Indian web series

- Promotional release poster
- Genre: Comedy
- Created by: Maruthi
- Written by: Ravi Namburi
- Directed by: Maggi
- Starring: Eesha Rebba; Payal Rajput; Poorna
- Composer: Sunny M.R.
- Country of origin: India
- Original language: Telugu
- No. of seasons: 1
- No. of episodes: 8

Production
- Executive producer: Kola Nageswara Rao
- Producer: Sreenivasa Kumar Naidu (SKN)
- Cinematography: M. N. Balreddy
- Editor: S. B. Uddhav
- Running time: 25–30 minutes
- Production company: Action Cut Movies

Original release
- Network: Aha
- Release: 12 November 2021 – present

3 Roses is an Indian Telugu-language streaming television series created by Maruthi, directed by Maggi and written by Ravi Namburi. Produced by SKN, the series features Eesha Rebba, Payal Rajput and Poorna in main roles. It premiered on Aha on 12 November 2021.

== Synopsis ==
Ritu, Jhanvi, and Indu are three best friends whose families call them back to Hyderabad so that the girls can get married and start new lives there. They witness a series of events that alter their lives.

== Cast ==
=== Main ===
- Eesha Rebba as Rithika "Ritu"
- Payal Rajput as Jhanavi "Janu"
- Poorna as Indu "Dumbo"

=== Recurring ===
- Harsha Chemudu as Prasad, Rithika's fiancé
- Hema as Rithika's mother
- Prince Cecil as Kabir, Jhanavi's love-interest
- Ishan as Sameer, Rithika's ex-boyfriend
- Sangeeth Sobhan as Alex, Indu's love-interest
- Sai Ronak as Chandu, Jhanavi's bestfriend
- Ravi Varma Adduri as Stanley, Jhanavi's father
- Satyam Rajesh as Indu's matrimonial alliance
- Saurabh Dhingra as Pratyush, Jhanavi's matrimonial alliance
- Naga Mahesh as Rithika's father
- Sirisha Sougandh as Sarla, Jhanavi's mother
- Sarayu Roy as Indu's friend & co-worker
- Goparaju Ramana as Indu's uncle
- Snehamadhuri Sharma

== Episodes ==
Episode	Title	Directed by	Written by	Date of Broadcast
1	"The Girl Next Door"	Maggi	Ravi Namburi	November 12, 2021
2	"Bold & Beautiful"	Maggi	Ravi Namburi	November 12, 2021
3	"Drama Queen"	Maggi	Ravi Namburi	November 12, 2021
4	"The Madness Begins"	Maggi	Ravi Namburi	November 12, 2021
5	"Law of Attraction"	Maggi	Ravi Namburi	November 19, 2021
6	"Alexander"	Maggi	Ravi Namburi	November 19, 2021
7	"Twist in the tale"	Maggi	Ravi Namburi	November 19, 2021
8	"Roses Red Revolution"	Maggi	Ravi Namburi	November 19, 2021

== Soundtrack ==
3 Roses

Soundtrack album by Sunny M.R.
- Released: November 24, 2021
- Recorded: 2021
- Length: 22:17
- Producer: Sunny M.R.

Sunny M.R. chronology
Super Over (2021)	3 Roses (2021)	Om Bheem Bush (2024)
External audio
- Audio Jukebox on YouTube

All music is composed by Sunny M.R..

No.	Title	Lyrics	Singer(s)	Length
1.	"Three Roses" (Backing Vocals: ZIA, Sunny M.R.)	Rambabu Gosala	Hricha Narayana, Sunny M.R.
2.	"Dheeme Dheeme"	Shloke Lal	Sunny M.R.
3.	"Telepathy" (Backing Vocals: Ritvik Shah, ZIA)	Rambabu Gosala	Sunny M.R.
4.	"Aakasame Saachiga"	Rambabu Gosala	Harshika Gudi, Sunny M.R.
5.	"Na Kannullo Kalane"	Rambabu Gosala	Sunny M.R., Harshika Gudi
6.	"Kallu Musi Unchina" (Backing Vocals: ZIA, Sunny M.R.)	Rambabu Gosala	Sunny M.R.
7.	"Ye Dil Tera" (Backing Vocals: Ritvik Shah, ZIA)	Rambabu Gosala	Sunny M.R.
8.	"Cherukove Nee Kala" (Backing Vocals: Ritvik Shah, ZIA, Hricha Narayana)	Rambabu Gosala	Sunny M.R., Hricha Narayana
Total length:				22:17

== Release ==
The first four episodes of the series were premiered on 12 November 2021. Later, the following four episodes were premiered on 19 November 2021. Prior to the release of the series, it was mistaken to be a remake of Amazon Prime Video's Hindi series Four More Shots Please!.

== Reception ==
Thadhagath Pathi of The Times of India gave a critical rating of 2 out of 5 and stated: "On their way to make a new-age and youthful series, Maruthi and Maggie lose the track completely and more importantly, forget to update their material to suit the current generation. 3 Roses is just potential lost". Giving the similar rating, Pinkvilla echoed the same. In the review, the critic opined that "the characters are unidimensional, especially the elders, who are described as "enemies" by a pub singer. Ageist jokes are a staple here". The Hans India wrote that "The series is romantic as well as humorous. Maruti Mark has been instrumental in bringing the Kathmandu thing that is happening in our environment to life. Stir in the emotions along with the pleasure. The story, written by Ravi Namburi, was interestingly screened by director Maggie as the audience immersed themselves, is architecturally superior".
