= Divyansha Kaushik =

Indian actress

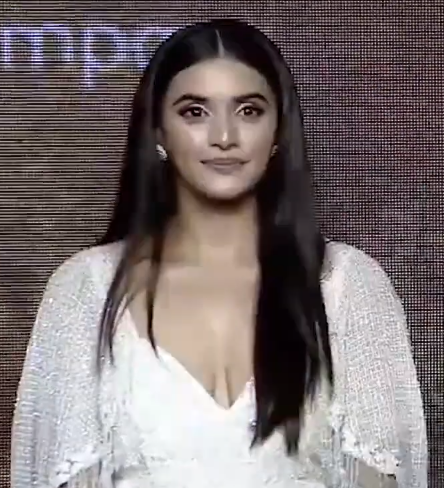
- Divyansha in 2019
- Born: New Delhi, India
- Occupation: Actress
- Years active: 2019–present

Divyansha Kaushik is an Indian actress who primarily works in Telugu films. She made her acting debut with the Telugu film Majili (2019).

== Early life ==
Divyansha was born and brought up in Delhi. Her mother, Anju Kaushik, is an established make-up artiste in Hindi cinema, who has mostly worked with Rani Mukerji. She worked as an intern with Yash Raj Films.

== Career ==
Divyansha made her acting debut in 2019 with the Telugu film Majili opposite Naga Chaitanya. It became a box-office success. Firstpost noted, "Divyansha Kaushik is a terrific new talent and she is the big surprise package of Majili."

She then made her Hindi film debut with The Wife in 2021. The film received mostly mixed reviews from critics and released on ZEE5.

She portrayed the lead opposite Ravi Teja in the 2022 Telugu film Ramarao on Duty. The News Minute stated "Divyansha is not given a substantial role. She is merely like a junior artist and seems miscast". It became a box-office failure.

Divyansha next appeared in the 2023 film Michael opposite Sundeep Kishan. Divyansha has Sudheer Varma's next Telugu film opposite Nikhil Siddharth and the long delayed Tamil film Takkar opposite Siddharth.

== Filmography ==
=== Films ===
Key
†	Denotes films that have not yet been released

Year	Title	Role	Language	Notes	Ref.
2019	Majili	Anshu	Telugu		
2021	The Wife	Katrina Murad	Hindi	Released on Zee5	
2022	Ramarao on Duty	Nandini Ramarao	Telugu		
2023	Michael	Theera	Telugu		
2023	Takkar	Mahalakshmi "Lucky"	Tamil		
2024	The Family Star	Govardhan's colleague	Telugu	Cameo appearance	
2024	Appudo Ippudo Eppudo	Tulasi / Chumbana	Telugu		

== Awards and nominations ==
Year	Award	Category	Film	Result	Ref(s)
2019	SIIMA Awards	Best Female Debut – Telugu	Majili	Nominated	
