= Abhishek Pictures =

Indian film distribution company

- Type: Private
- Industry: Entertainment
- Founded: 1976
- Founder: Nama Madhusudhan Rao
- Fate: Active
- Headquarters: Hyderabad, India
- Area served: India
- Key people: Abhishek Nama
- Products: Goodachari (2018)
- Services: Film production Film distribution
- Owner: Abhishek Nama
- Website: www.abhishekpictures.com

Abhishek Pictures is a film distribution and production company that was founded in 1976 by Nama Madhusudhan Rao. The company distributed over 100 films across India, with the majority of its catalogue being Hindi cinema. His son, Abhishek Nama, later took over the business.

In 2017, Abhishek decided to venture into film production. Abhishek Pictures produced Babu Baga Busy, the remake of Hunterrr (2015), starring Srinivas Avasarala.

== Distribution ==
Films distributed by Abhishek Pictures include Harry Potter and the Order of the Phoenix , 10,000 BC , Pyaar Ke Side Effects, Men in Black 3, 2012, My Name Is Khan, Dum Maaro Dum, Kabali, Srimanthudu.

== Production ==
Babu Baga Busy was Nama's first film as a Producer. Nama went on to produce, Saakshyam, Goodachari, Keshava. In 2022, Abhishek Pictures ventured into producing content for OTT platforms.

== Filmography ==
Year	Film	Language	Notes
2017	Babu Baga Busy	Telugu	
2017	Keshava	Telugu	
2018	Saakshyam	Telugu	
2018	Goodachari	Telugu	
2023	Ravanasura	Telugu	
2023	Prema Vimanam	Telugu	
2023	Devil: The British Secret Agent	Telugu	
2026	Nagabandham: The Secret Treasure	Telugu	
2026	G2 †	Telugu	
TBA	Garuda: Chapter 1 †	Telugu	

== Film distribution ==
=== Telugu ===
Year	Film	Region distributed
2010	Varudu	Nizam
2010	Gaayam 2	Nizam
2010	Yamudu	Nizam
2011	Veppam	Nizam
2011	Seema Tapakai	Nizam
2012	Ishq	Nizam
2012	Naa Ishtam	Nizam
2013	Shadow	Nizam With Suresh Movies
2013	Yamudu II	Nizam With Global Cinemas
2013	Gunde Jaari Gallanthayyinde	Nizam With Global Cinemas
2013	Attarintiki Daredi	Nizam With Global Cinemas
2014	Heart Attack	Nizam With Global Cinemas
2014	Manam	Nizam With Global Cinemas
2015	Kumari 21F	Guntur, west, East, Krishna
2015	Loafer	Nellore
2015	Rudhramadevi	
2015	Tripura	Nizam
2015	Jadoogadu	Nizam
2015	Srimanthudu	Nizam
2015	Abhinethri	World Wide Release
2016	Kaashmora	Nizam
2016	Manauri Ramayanam	Nizam
2016	Kabali	Nizam
2016	Inkokkadu	
2016	Brahmotsavam	Nizam
2016	Supreme	World Wide Release
2016	Speedunnodu	
2016	Raja Cheyyi Vesthe	Nizam
2016	Eedo Rakam Aado Rakam	Nizam
2016	Kalyana Vaibhogame	
2016	Krishna Gaadi Veera Prema Gaadha	Nizam, Cedded, Andhra
2016	Nannaku Prematho	Nizam
2017	Arjun Reddy	West Godavari
2018	Bhairava Geetha	World Wide Release
2019	Abhinethri 2	World Wide Release
2019	Meeku Maathrame Cheptha	Vizag
2019	Lakshmi's NTR	Nizam
2019	Seven	World Wide Release
2019	Rakshasudu	World Wide Release
2019	iSmart Shankar	Vizag, Krishna, East, Nellore, Chennai, North India
2019	George Reddy	World Wide Release
2020	Pressure Cooker	World Wide Release
2020	World Famous Lover	Vizag, Krishna, East, West, Guntur, Nellore
2022	FIR	

=== Hollywood ===
Year	Film	Region distributed
2007	Harry potter and the order of the phoenix	Nizam
2007	NEXT	Nizam, cedded, Andhra, Maratawada
2008	The Dark Knight	Nizam, cedded, Andhra, Maratawada
2009	10,000 BC	Nizam
2009	Harry Potter and the Half-Blood Prince	Nizam
2009	Underworld: Rise of the Lycans	Nizam, cedded, Andhra, Maratawada
2010	2012	Nizam
2010	NARNIA-3	Nizam
2010	Knight and Day	Nizam
2010	Wall Street: Money Never Sleeps	Nizam
2010	UNSTOPPABLE	Nizam
2010	Gulliver's Travel	Nizam
2010	127 Hours	Nizam
2010	Alpha and Omega	World Wide Release
2011	Rio	Nizam
2011	Water for Elephants	Nizam
2011	180	Nizam
2011	X-Men: First Class	Nizam
2011	Mr. Popper's Penguins	Nizam
2011	Planet of the Apes	Nizam
2011	In Time	Nizam
2011	What's Your Number?	Nizam
2011	The Darkest Hour	Nizam
2011	We Bought a Zoo	Nizam
2011	MARRIGOLD	Nizam
2011	Alvin and the Chipmunks	Nizam
2012	This Means War	Nizam
2012	Ice Age	Nizam
2012	Chronicle	Nizam
2012	Prometheus	Nizam
2012	Abraham Lincoln: Vampire Hunter	Nizam
2012	TITANIC.3D	Nizam
2012	Life of Pi	Nizam
2015	The Descendants	Nizam
2016	Nice 2 Meet U	World Wide Release
2016	The BFG	Nizam

=== Other languages ===
Year	Film	Language	Region distributed	Notes
2006	Pyaar Ke Side Effects	Hindi	Nizam	
2007	Anwar	Hindi	Nizam	
2009	99	Hindi	Nizam, Maratawada	
2010	Atithi Tum Kab Jaoge?	Hindi	Nizam, Maratawada	
2010	Khichdi: The Movie	Hindi	Nizam	
2010	My Name Is Khan	Hindi	Nizam	
2011	Dum Maaro Dum	Hindi	Nizam	
2011	Stanley Ka Dabba	Hindi	Nizam	
2011	Force	Hindi	Nizam	
2012	London, Paris, New York	Hindi	Nizam	
2012	Ekk Deewana Tha	Hindi	Nizam	
2015	All Is Well	Hindi	Nizam, Maratawada	
2015	Rudhramadevi ( Hindi )	Hindi	North India with Reliance	
2016	1920: London	Hindi	Nizam, Maratawada	
2016	Tere Bin Laden: Dead or Alive	Hindi	Nizam, Maratawada	
2016	Ghayal: Once Again	Hindi	Nizam, Maratawada	
2016	Wazir	Hindi	Nizam, Maratawada	
2022	FIR	Tamil	India	Telugu dubbed version
