= Keshava (film) =

2017 action thriller film directed by Sudheer Varma

- Theatrical release poster
- Directed by: Sudheer Varma
- Screenplay by: Sudheer Varma
- Dialogues by: Krishna Chaitanya
- Story by: Sudheer Varma
- Produced by: Abhishek Nama
- Starring: Nikhil Siddharth; Ritu Varma; Isha Koppikar
- Cinematography: Divakar Mani
- Edited by: M. S. Rajashekhar Reddy (S. R. Shekhar)
- Music by: Sunny M. R.
- Production company: Abhishek Pictures
- Release date: 19 May 2017
- Running time: 117 minutes
- Country: India
- Language: Telugu
- Budget: ₹3 crore
- Box office: est.₹30 crore

Keshava is a 2017 Indian Telugu-language action thriller film directed by Sudheer Varma and produced by Abhishek Nama. It stars Nikhil Siddhartha in the titular role, alongside Ritu Varma and Isha Koppikar, Rao Ramesh, Brahmaji, Ajay, Raja Ravindra, Vennela Kishore and Priyadarshi Pullikonda. The music was composed by Sunny M. R., while the cinematography and editing were handled by Divakar Mani and S. R. Shekhar.

Keshava was released worldwide on 19 May 2017 to positive reviews from critics and became a commercial success.

== Plot ==
A family, travelling in a car, gets hit by a police jeep and left to die. Keshava wakes up in the hospital to learn that his parents are killed and his younger sister lost her legs. Keshava, now a youngster, walks in a desolate forest road and asks a biker for a lift. After a while, the biker halts to attend nature's call and Keshava stabs him to death. Keshava is a law student with a rare heart condition called dextrocardia, which prevents him from activities resulting in a faster heart beat. A fisherman witnesses the dead body of the biker hanging from a tree and informs the police.

The police identify the victim as a police officer. Satyabhama attends the same college as Keshava, where she recognizes Keshava as her childhood friend, but he dismisses her and keeps avoiding her. As the police fail to find any clues, the police commissioner appoints Sharmila Mishra, a special branch officer, to investigate the case. Keshava is sipping tea in front of a police station and identifies another police officer as someone, who tried to kill him and his sister in hospital. He follows the officer on his bike and kills him in a desolate place. Sharmila finds the dead body hanging from a construction crane. Sharmila connects the dots and figures out that these two murders are done by the same person.

After investigation, Sharmila concludes that the killer is left-handed. Satyabhama notices Keshava writing with his left hand and remembers him doing the same in their childhood. She follows him to the library and notices him reading about the murders. Satyabhama manages to get the attendance register and finds out that Keshava was absent during both days of the murders. She goes to his home and makes him admit that he is her childhood friend. Keshava, Satyabhama and his friends go to Annavaram to volunteer for a temple program. Keshava comes across another officer and recognizes him as one of the officer who had left his family to die after the accident.

Keshava kills the officer after a fight, but he is noticed by watchmen while returning and one of them hits him with a stone on the back of his head. After returning to the accommodation, Keshava's friends confront him to confess his activities. Keshava narrates his past, which leads him to kill some people. They decide to help Keshava and gets him treated for his head injury from a local doctor, who later informs the police after watching the news about the murder and details of the suspect on TV. The next day while travelling in a bus, Sharmila apprehends Keshava and takes him to Visakhapatnam for interrogation. Keshava denies all charges on him and his friends destroys the evidence of his involvement.

Meanwhile, Krishna Murthy, a retired officer, is reportedly attacked by a person matching the description of the killer. Keshava is eventually released and meets Krishna Murthy. He narrates that he is among the people responsible for the death of his parents. While returning from election duty, Nakul was driving while intoxicated and had caused the accident. Although his colleagues requested them to save the victims, Nakul ignored them. Keshava later narrates to Sharmila that he is not avenging the accident, but murder. He reveals that his parents were alive after the accident and that the policemen returned and drove over them to ensure that there would not be witnesses against them.

Keshava finds another officer Bheemeswar and kills him in broad daylight. Nakul tries to locate Keshava but to no avail. Sharmila gets suspicious of Krishna Murthy and confronts him, but he knocks her. Keshava is kidnapped by Nakul's henchmen, but he manages to escape and kills Nakul. Krishna Murthy and Sharmila have a heated argument, where Krishna Murthy admits that he drove the jeep at the time of the accident and is the main culprit. He rescued Keshava from the police so that Keshava will kill Nakul and he would inherits benami properties of Nakul. Keshava is already on the spot when Krishna Murthy was narrating these events to Sharmila. In a subsequent chase, Krishna Murthy meets with an accident. Keshava warns him not to drink and drive in his next life, and burns the car. Sharmila closes the case as an accident. Keshava starts a new life with his sister and Satyabhama.

== Cast ==
- Nikhil Siddharth as Sri Keshav Sharma "Keshava"
- Ritu Varma as Sathyabhama, Keshava’s love-interest
- Isha Koppikar as Sharmila Mishra (voice dubbed by Anasuya Bharadwaj)
- Rao Ramesh as Krishna Murthy
- Brahmaji as Bheemeswar
- Ajay as Nakul
- Raja Ravindra
- Vennela Kishore as Ranga
- Priyadarshi Pullikonda as Keshava's bestfriend
- Ravi Prakash as C.I. Ravi
- Satya as Taxi Driver Malinga
- Sudharshan as Ranga’s friend
- Madhunandan as Ranga's friend
- Sameer as Keshava's father
- Meena Vasu as Keshava’s mother
- Jeeva as Police Commissioner
- Vedula Peri Raju as Lecturer

== Production ==
Keshava was primarily filmed in Visakhapatnam, Araku, Kakinada, and Narasapuram, as the story is set in these locations. Director Sudheer Varma selected these areas due to his personal connection, having studied in Visakhapatnam and Kakinada. Some scenes were even shot at his former school. Varma ensured the locations added depth to the narrative. For example, the Mada forests in Kakinada, previously shown briefly in other films, were explored in detail to highlight their natural beauty. Around 80% of the film was shot in these regions, with the locations playing an integral role in the story.

== Music ==
Keshava

Studio album by Sunny M.R.
- Released: 2017
- Recorded: 2016–17
- Genre: Film soundtrack
- Length: 17:56
- Label: E3 Music

Sunny M.R. chronology
Bhale Manchi Roju (2015)	Keshava (2017)	Husharu (2018)

Music was composed by Sunny M.R. Music released on E3 Music Company.

Track list
No.	Title	Singer(s)	Length
1.	"Kala Bhairava Ashtakam"	Harsha Gudi, Satya Yamini, Sri Soumya	02:40
2.	"Telusa Neeku Bahusa"	Shalmali Kholgade, Sunny M.R.	03:41
3.	"Yedisthe Rarevaru"	Arijit Singh	03:45
4.	"Po Poradi"	Arijit Singh	03:14
5.	"Kala Bhairava Ashtakam (Re-Created)"	Harshika Gudi, Satya Yamini, Sri Soumya	03:36
Total length:			17:56

== Reception ==
=== Critical response ===
Ch Sowmya Sruthi of The Times of India gave 3/5 stars and wrote, "The movie makes for a decent watch with commendable performances and gripping screenplay." Idlebrain gave 3/5 stars and wrote, "Keshava is a stylish revenge drama that appeals to a set of audiences."

Sangeetha Devi Dundoo of The Hindu said, "Keshava is good, but it had potential to be smarter and exceptional." Suresh Kavirayani of Deccan Chronicle said, "Sudheer Varma has taken a regular revenge plot and narrated it in a stylised manner."

=== Box office ===
Keshava grossed ₹11.4 crore worldwide on its first three-day weekend, earning a distributor share of ₹7.5 crore. The film grossed ₹30 crore at the global box office.
