= Ranarangam =

- First look poster
- Directed by: Sudheer Varma
- Written by: Sudheer Varma
- Screenplay by: Sudheer Varma
- Produced by: Suryadevara Naga Vamsi
- Starring: Sharwanand; Kajal Aggarwal; Kalyani Priyadarshan
- Cinematography: Divakar Mani
- Edited by: Naveen Nooli
- Music by: Karthik Rodriguez; Prashant Pillai; Sunny M. R.
- Production company: Sithara Entertainments
- Distributed by: Haarika & Hassine Creations
- Release date: 15 August 2019
- Running time: 138 minutes
- Country: India
- Language: Telugu

Ranarangam (transl. 'Battlefield') is a 2019 Indian Telugu-language action crime film written and directed by Sudheer Varma and produced by Suryadevara Naga Vamsi, under Sithara Entertainments. It featured Sharwanand, Kajal Aggarwal and Kalyani Priyadarshan in the lead roles. The film follows a non-linear narrative and chronicles the rise of a gangster and powerful liquor-baron named Deva.

Ranarangam was released on 15 August 2019 to mixed reviews from the critics and audience. Despite a strong opening, the film became a commercial failure at the box office.

== Plot ==
In Spain, Sanjay is a contractor, who takes the help of an MLA from Visakhapatnam to convince a liquor baron named Deva to clear a slum area which can be used for the construction of the Vizag International Airport, so that the value of the neighboring land, which is meant for the construction and belonging to Sanjay, will increase. However, Deva refuses the request.

1990: In Visakhapatnam, Deva and his friends sell movie tickets in black. Deva falls in love with Gita. When the prohibition of alcohol is announced in 1995, Deva decides to enter the illegal liquor business by smuggling alcohol from Orissa into the city and selling it. In this process, Deva and his gang subsequently lock horns with another illegal liquor baron and MLA Simhachalam.

Deva and his gang are imprisoned for 6 months after being caught smuggling a truckload of liquor into the state. When they are released, they attack and steal a consignment of liquor belonging to Simhachalam. A slow shift in power takes place, as Deva bribes higher officials who were on Simhachalam's payroll. In retribution, Simhachalam murders Deva's friends and orchestrates a bomb blast that kills his wife Gita, hours after she had given birth to Sahasra. A vengeful Deva goes on a killing spree, finishing Simhachalam's associates and shutting down his criminal empire, as Simhachalam himself goes into hiding.

Present: Deva and his daughter Sahasra become well acquainted with Geetha, a doctor. During an outing to a mall with Sahasra and Geetha, an assassination attempt is made on Deva by Sanjay, who has colluded with Deva's rivals in Spain and is being assisted by Simhachalam. Geetha and Sahasra are kidnapped by Simhachalam in Deva's absence. Deva agrees and flies to Visakhapatnam to meet Simhachalam.

In a turn of events, Deva reveals that he had secretly found and murdered Simhachalam 10 days after the latter had gone into hiding, and is aware that the man pretending to be Simhachalam and orchestrating the scam is Deva's right-hand man Suri. Suri reveals that his thirst for power and jealousy that Deva rose above them all despite the business being all of theirs led to his betrayal. Suri's men attack him instead of Deva, revealing that they are working for the latter. Deva kills Suri, Sanjay and the Home Minister, and returns to Spain.

== Cast ==
- Sharwanand as Deva
- Kalyani Priyadarshan as Gita
- Kajal Aggarwal as Geetha
- Preethi Alluri as Sahasra, Deva's and Gita's daughter
- Murali Sharma as MLA Simhachalam
- Ashutosh Rana as Afghani Minister
- Raja Chembolu as Suri
- Brahmaji as Home Minister
- Praveen as Vinay, Deva's Assistant in Spain
- Ajay as Sanjay
- Aadarsh Balakrishna as Seshu
- Bhadram as Gita's prospective groom
- Pankaj Kesari as Pankaj
- Sudharshan as Deva's gang member
- Raja Ravindra as CI Sriram
- Kalpa Latha

== Production ==
Portions of Ranarangam were filmed at Kakinada Port. However, director Sudheer Varma noted the challenges of recreating the pre-mobile phone era. To overcome this, a coastal city set was constructed at an aluminum factory for the production.

== Soundtrack ==
Ranarangam

Studio album by Prashant Pillai, Karthik Rodriguez & Sunny M.R.
- Released: 10 August 2019
- Recorded: 2018–2019
- Studios: My Studio, Kochi
- Genre: Film soundtrack
- Label: Aditya Music
External audio
- Audio song on YouTube

Singles from Ranarangam
- 1. "Seetha Kalyanam" Released: 4 July 2019; 2. "Kannu Kotti" Released: 20 July 2019; 3. "Pilla Picture Perfect" Released: 29 July 2019

Prashant Pillai, Karthik Rodriguez and Sunny M.R. composed the soundtrack of the film, where the former composed the background score. All lyrics were penned by Krishna Chaitanya, except the song "Seetha Kalyanam" which was penned by Balaji. Aditya Music hold the rights to the music. The first single, "Seetha Kalyanam" sung by Srihari and written by Balaji was released on 4 July 2019. The second song "Kannu Kotti" both composed and sung by Karthik Rodriguez was released on 20 July 2019. The third single "Pilla Picture Perfect" composed by Sunny M.R. was released on 29 July 2019. The entire soundtrack album was released on 10 August 2019.

Track listing
No.	Title	Lyrics	Music	Singer(s)	Length
1.	"Seetha Kalyanam"	Balaji	Prashant Pillai	Sreehari K	3:31
2.	"Pilla Picture Perfect"	Krishna Chaitanya	Sunny M.R.	Nikhita Gandhi	3:35
3.	"Kannu Kotti"	Krishna Chaitanya	Karthik Rodriguez	Karthik Rodriguez	2:39
4.	"Evaro Evaro"	Krishna Chaitanya	Prashant Pillai	Preethi Pillai	4:16
5.	"Kummeyra"	Krishna Chaitanya	Karthik Rodriguez	Karthik Rodriguez	3:33

== Reception ==
The film was released theatrically on 15 August 2019. The film was later dubbed and released in Hindi as Don Returns on 4 April 2021 by Goldmines Telefilms directly on their TV channel, Dhinchaak.

The Times of India gave 3 out of 5 stars stating, "The kind of film that allows you to soak in its mindless beauty much before you realise it’s heading in a completely predictable direction".
