= Harsha Chemudu =

Indian actor (born 1990)

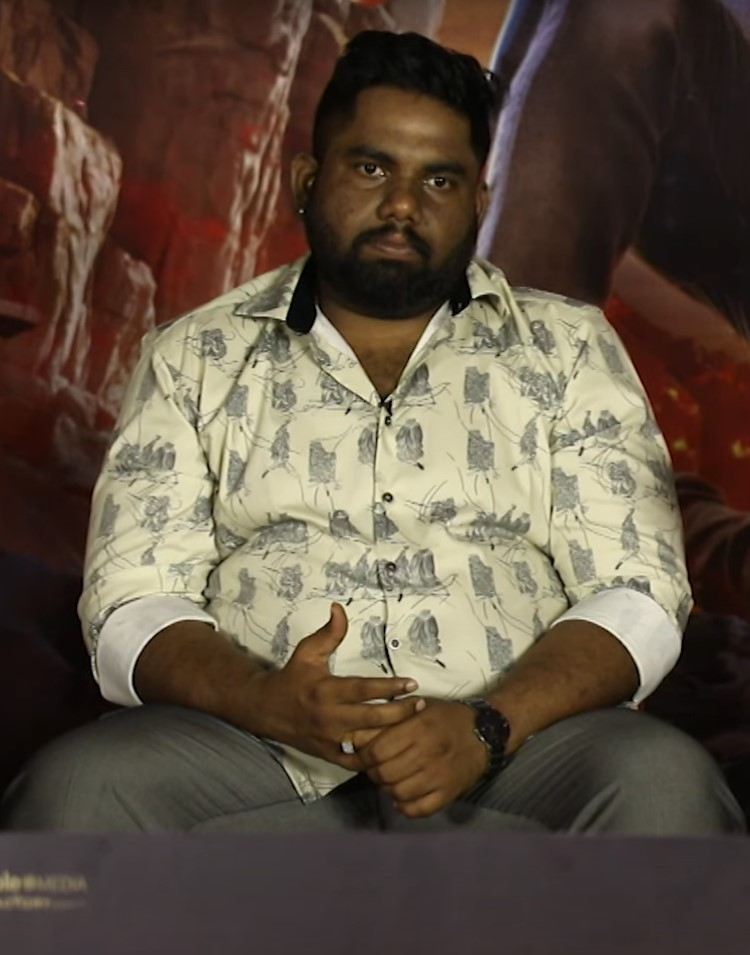
- Born: 31 August 1991 (age 34)
- Other name: Viva Harsha
- Education: Sree Chaitanya Engineering College
- Occupations: Actor; YouTuber
- Years active: 2013–present

Harsha Chemudu (born 31 August 1991) is an Indian actor who works in Telugu cinema. He started his acting career with the viral web series Viva on YouTube with which he came to be known as "Viva" Harsha.

== Early life ==
Harsha graduated in Mechanical Engineering from Chaitanya Engineering College in Visakhapatnam, Andhra Pradesh, India. In an interview, he said that he's an introvert.

== Career ==
After that, he made his debut on the big-screen with his appearance in the Telugu movie Masala in 2013 and took part in the film's promotional campaign. He also worked in films like Govindudu Andarivadele, Dohchay, Colour Photo, Thank You Brother, Thimmarusu: Assignment Vali and others.

He worked in the web series The Grill (2019) and Hostel Daze (2019). He co-hosted Sam Jam with Samantha Ruth Prabhu in 2020 and was the host of Tamasha with Harsha, both streamed on Aha.

== Filmography ==
=== Films ===
Key
†	Denotes films that have not yet been released

Year	Title	Role(s)	Notes
2013	Masala		
2014	Maine Pyar Kiya	Naveen's friend	
2014	Power	Nirupama's fan	
2014	Govindudu Andarivadele	Bangari's friend	
2014	Chakkiligintha	Hrithik Reddy	
2015	Ram Leela	Exorcist	
2015	Surya vs Surya	Ice Gola vendor	
2015	Dohchay	Manikyam's henchman	
2015	Singham 123	Junior Lingam	
2015	Dynamite	Stranger at restaurant	
2015	Red Alert		
2015	Size Zero	Sweety's fan	
2015	Yavvanam Oka Fantasy	Google	
2015	Shankarabharanam	Happy's cousin	
2015	Jatha Kalise	Hacker Srinu	
2016	Chal Chal Gurram		
2016	Krishnashtami		
2016	Raja Cheyyi Vesthe	Raja Ram's friend	
2016	Jakkanna	Kung Fu Pandu Assistant	
2016	Ekkadiki Pothavu Chinnavada	Arjun's friend	
2017	Nenorakam	Nandi Raju Srikanth's son	
2017	Tholi Parichayam		
2017	Nakshatram	Dance Master	
2017	Jai Lava Kusa		
2017	Raja the Great	Kabbadi commentator	
2017	Okka Kshanam		
2018	Chalo		
2018	Tholi Prema	Aditya's childhood friend	
2018	Ameerpet to America		
2018	Vaadu Nenu Kaadhu		
2018	Tej I Love You	Harsha	
2018	Vijetha		
2018	Neevevaro	Kalyan's friend	
2018	Nannu Dochukunduvate	Harsha	
2019	ABCD: American Born Confused Desi	Santosh	
2019	Bhagyanagara Veedullo Gamattu		
2020	Krishna and His Leela	Harsha	
2020	Bhanumathi & Ramakrishna	Bunty	
2020	Colour Photo	Bala Yesu	
2020	Maa Vintha Gaadha Vinuma	College Senior	
2021	Super Over	Bangaru Raju	
2021	30 Rojullo Preminchadam Ela	Nagarjuna	
2021	Thank You Brother	Chiku	
2021	Thellavarithe Guruvaram		
2021	Thimmarusu: Assignment Vali	Harsha	
2021	Vivaha Bhojanambu	Government Officer	
2021	Gully Rowdy	David Raj	
2021	Maha Samudram	Arjun's friend	
2021	Manchi Rojulochaie	Banda Babu	
2021	Pushpaka Vimanam	Meenakshi's ex one-sided lover	
2022	Hero	Forest thief	
2022	Mishan Impossible	Booking clerk	
2022	Pakka Commercial	Balraju	
2022	Karthikeya 2	Suleman	
2022	Bimbisara	Devadutta's companion	
2023	Premadesam	Arjun's friend	
2023	Organic Mama Hybrid Alludu	Vijay's friend	
2023	Baby	Harsha	
2023	Nireekshana	Gautham's friend	
2023	Mr. Pregnant	Gautham's friend	
2023	Prem Kumar	Himself	Cameo appearance
2023	Month of Madhu	Bhushan	
2023	Rules Ranjann	Ranjan's friend	
2023	Bubblegum	Madman	
2024	Ooru Peru Bhairavakona	John	
2024	Sundaram Master	Sundaram Master	
2024	Paarijatha Parvam	Harsha	
2024	Prasanna Vadanam	Vignesh	
2024	Aa Okkati Adakku	Abhinav	
2024	Appudo Ippudo Eppudo	Balaji	
2024	Mechanic Rocky	Harsha	
2024	Bachchala Malli	Raghava	
2025	Game Changer	Ram's friend	
2025	Thandel	Rambabu	
2025	28 Degree Celsius	Dr Harsha	
2025	Sarangapani Jathakam	Ramki	
2025	Junior	Kannan	Simultaneously shot in Kannada
2025	Bakasura Restaurant	Bakka Suri "Bakasura"	
2025	Ari: My Name is Nobody	Amul Kumar	
2025	Telusu Kada	Abhi	
2025	12A Railway Colony	Karthik's friend	
2025	Mowgli	Prabhas Bunty	
2026	The RajaSaab	Kareemulla	
2026	Mana Shankara Vara Prasad Garu	Drunkard	
2026	Bhartha Mahasayulaku Wignyapthi	Bangkok Sathya	
2026	Jetlee	Pilot Captain Kotappa Konda	
2026	Vishwanath & Sons	Kishore	Tamil film

=== Television ===
Year	Title	Role(s)	Network	Ref.
2019	The Grill	Ganesh	Viu	
2019	Hostel Daze	Ravi Teja	Amazon Prime Video	
2020	Shit Happens	Harsha	Aha	
2020	Tamasha with Harsha	Host	Aha	
2020–2021	Sam Jam	Co-Host	Aha	
2021-2025	3 Roses	Prasad	Aha	
2023	Dead Pixels	Anand	Disney+ Hotstar	
2025	Devika & Danny	John	JioHotstar	
2025	AIR: All India Rankers	BVS	ETV Win	

=== YouTube videos ===
Year	Title	Ref.
2013	Viva	
2014	Facebook Baba	
2016	The Results	
2016	Dadminton Theory	
2016	The Big Fat Proposal	
2016	The Interview	
2017	The Tourist Guide	
2017	Drink and Drive	
2017	The Exams trilogy	
2017	Modern Swayamvaram	
2018	The Visa Interview	

== Awards and nominations ==
Award (Note: Awards, festivals and organizations are in alphabetical order.)	Year (Note: Date is linked to the article about the awards held that year, wherever possible.)	Category	Work	Result	Ref.
Santosham Film Awards	2023	Allu Ramalingaiah Smaraka Award	—	Won	
South Indian International Movie Awards	2021	Best Comedian – Telugu	Colour Photo	Nominated	
