= Ramarao on Duty =

2022 film directed by Sarath Mandava

- Theatrical release poster
- Directed by: Sarath Mandava
- Written by: Sarath Mandava
- Produced by: Sudhakar Cherukuri
- Starring: Ravi Teja; Divyansha Kaushik; Rajisha Vijayan; Chaitanya Krishna; Venu Thottempudi
- Cinematography: Sathyan Sooryan
- Edited by: Praveen K. L.
- Music by: Sam C. S.
- Production companies: Sri Lakshmi Venkateswara Cinemas; RT Team Works
- Distributed by: B4U Films
- Release date: 29 July 2022
- Running time: 146 minutes
- Country: India
- Language: Telugu
- Budget: ₹40 to 50crore

Ramarao on Duty is a 2022 Indian Telugu-language mystery action drama film written and directed by Sarath Mandava. Produced by SLV Cinemas and RT Team Works, it stars Ravi Teja in title role alongside Divyansha Kaushik, Rajisha Vijayan (in her Telugu debut), Chaitanya Krishna and Venu Thottempudi. The plot follows Ramarao, an honest civil servant, who is on a mission to eradicate corruption to help the people struggling in poverty.

The film began its production in July 2021 in Hyderabad with filming also taking place in Andhra Pradesh and Spain. Ramarao on Duty was released theatrically on 29 July 2022, which received mixed to negative reviews from critics and ended up as a box office failure.

== Premise ==
B. Ramarao, a deputy collector turned M.R.O. posted at Chittoor, begins to investigate the disappearance of his ex-girlfriend Malini's husband Surendra. That is when he learns about unsolved murder cases in the area and their connection to an illegal red sandalwood smuggling racket.

== Cast ==
- Ravi Teja as Deputy Collector B. Ramarao IAS, Later Special Squad in Indian Army
- Divyansha Kaushik as Nandini, Ramarao's wife
- Rajisha Vijayan as Malini, Ramarao's ex-girlfriend and Surendra's wife
- Chaitanya Krishna as Surendra, Malini's husband.
- Venu Thottempudi as C. I. Jammi Murali
- Arvind Krishna as RMP Kabir.
- John Vijay as SP Devanand IPS
- Rahul Ramakrishna as Ananth
- Balakrishna as Viraj, kingpin of the red sandalwood smuggling syndicate, the main antagonist (cameo appearance)
- Nassar as Prasada Rao, Rama Rao's father
- Naresh as Rama Rao's father-in-law
- Pavitra Lokesh as Mahalakshmi, Rama Rao's mother
- Tanikella Bharani as Collector
- Thotapalli Madhu as MLA Satyanarayana
- Madhusudhan Rao as Varma's father
- Surekha Vani as Varma's wife
- Anveshi Jain as Seesa, a bar dancer (cameo appearance in the item song "Naa Peru Seesa")

== Production ==
The film was tentatively titled RT68 as intended to be Ravi Teja's 68th film as a lead actor. In July 2021, the film's official title was unveiled as Ramarao on Duty. Principal photography of the film began on 1 July 2021 in Hyderabad. The film has wrapped for its final schedule of the shoot in October 2021. Filming also took place at Maredumilli forest, East Godavari district in Andhra Pradesh. The production moved to Spain in March 2022 to picturize few songs.

== Music ==
Ramarao On Duty

Soundtrack album by Sam C. S.
- Released: 5 August 2022
- Recorded: 2021–2022
- Genre: Soundtrack
- Length: 18:20
- Language: Telugu
- Labels: T-Series; Lahari Music

Sam C. S. chronology
Rocketry: The Nambi Effect (2022)	Ramarao On Duty (2022)	Yenni Thuniga (2022)
External audio
- Audio Jukebox on YouTube

Singles from Ramarao on Duty
- 1. "Bul Bul Tarang" Released: 10 April 2022; 2. "Sottala Buggallo" Released: 7 May 2022; 3. "Naa Peru Seesa" Released: 2 July 2022; 4. "King of the Crowd - Ramarao on Duty Title Song" Released: 22 July 2022

The soundtrack and score of the film is composed by Sam C. S.

No.	Title	Lyrics	Singer(s)	Length
1.	"Bul Bul Tarang"	Rakendu Mouli	Sid Sriram	3.35
2.	"Sottala Buggallo"	Kalyan Chakravarthy	Haripriya, Nakul Abhyankar	4:11
3.	"Naa Peru Seesa"	Chandrabose	Shreya Ghoshal, Sam C. S.	3:31
4.	"King of the Crowd - Ramarao on Duty Title Song"	Sarath Mandava	Lavita Lobo	3:26
5.	"Usuraagithe"	Kalyan Chakravarthy	Sreerama Chandra	3:28
Total length:				18:20

== Release ==
=== Theatrical ===
The film was released theatrically on 29 July 2022, after postponing 2 times from 25 March 2022 to 17 June 2022. It is rumoured that the movie underwent too many hassles in post production Earlier in December 2021, its release date was announced as 25 March 2022. In February 2022, the makers announced their intention to release the film on 25 March 2022 if RRR was to be postponed from that date, else on 17 June 2022. In March, the film's release was postponed to on 17 June 2022. In May 2022, the film was postponed due to production delays.

=== Home media ===
The digital streaming rights of the film were acquired by SonyLIV. The film was digitally streamed on SonyLIV from 15 September 2022 in Telugu and dubbed versions of Tamil, Hindi, Malayalam and Kannada languages.

== Reception ==
Rama Rao on Duty received negative reviews from critics and audience with criticism towards the storyline and dull performances.

Ram Venkat Srikar of Cinema Express rated the film 2.5 out of 5 stars and wrote "Ramarao On Duty misses a great opportunity to blend the masala we love in Telugu films with a genre, and ends up underwhelming us on both fronts". Writing for The Hindu, Sangeetha Devi Dundoo stated that "The forest zone and a plot involving red sandalwood smuggling might remind us of Pushpa: The Rise, but this film just does not have that chutzpah. Neither is it as content driven as the makers would like to believe". Neeshita Nyayapati of The Times of India rated the film 2 out of 5 stars and wrote "Rama Rao on Duty is a chore to sit through, meandering between being a proper thriller and a masala entertainer that's not engaging." Balakrishna Ganeshan of The News Minute rated the film 1.5 out of 5 stars and wrote "Rama Rao On Duty is a glorious misfire and a superficial attempt with plenty of loopholes that leave you dissatisfied". A critic for The Hans India rated the film 1.5 out of 5 stars and wrote "First half of the film is more of conversational and passive. The writing gives an overstuffed feeling".
