= Takkar (2023 film) =

2023 Indian romantic action comedy film

- Theatrical release poster
- Directed by: Karthik G. Krish
- Written by: Shrinivas Kaviinayam; Karthik G. Krish
- Produced by: Sudhan Sundaram; G. Jayaram
- Starring: Siddharth; Divyansha Kaushik; Yogi Babu
- Cinematography: Vanchinathan Murugesan
- Edited by: G. A. Gowtham
- Music by: Nivas K. Prasanna
- Production company: Passion Studios
- Release date: 9 June 2023
- Country: India
- Language: Tamil

Takkar (released internationally as The Bang) is a 2023 Indian Tamil-language romantic action comedy film written and directed by Karthik G. Krish and produced by Passion Studios. The film stars Siddharth, Divyansha Kaushik and Yogi Babu in the lead roles, alongside Abhimanyu Singh, Munishkanth and RJ Vigneshkanth in supporting roles.

Takkar was released on 9 June 2023 to negative reviews from critics and became a box-office bomb.

== Plot ==
Gunasekaran alias "Gunz" is a happy-go-lucky youngster who has the desire to become a millionaire, where he gets entangled with a rich girl named Lucky, who believes that money is the root cause of distress. While on a road trip, Guns and Lucky get stuck in a web of human trafficking and unexpected twists which alter their lives.

== Cast ==
- Siddharth as Gunasekaran "Gunz"
- Divyansha Kaushik as Mahalakshmi "Lucky"
- Yogi Babu as Bombay Varadarajan and Don Max
- Abhimanyu Singh as Raaz
- Munishkanth as Oragadam Madhavan "Oram"
- RJ Vigneshkanth as RJ Laddu
- Arun Vaidyanathan as Vaidy
- Sujatha Sivakumar as Gunz's mother
- Dheena Dhayalan as hotel receptionist

== Production ==
The film was directed in 2019 by Karthik G. Krish, who earlier directed Kappal, and the unreleased Shaitan Ka Bachcha (also featuring Siddharth), and produced by Sudhan Sundaram and G. Jayaram under the banner of Passion Studios. The cinematography of the film was done by Vanchinathan Murugesan, and the editing of the film was done by GA Gowtham. The film was shot in Chennai and Sikkim.

== Music ==
Takkar

Soundtrack album by Nivas K. Prasanna
- Released: 2020, 2023
- Recorded: 2020
- Genre: Feature film soundtrack
- Length: 24:01
- Language: Tamil
- Label: Think Music
- Producer: Nivas K. Prasanna

Nivas K. Prasanna chronology
Yaadhum Oore Yaavarum Kelir (2023)	Takkar (2020)	Emakku Thozhil Romance (2024)

Singles from Takkar
- 1. "Rainbow Thiralil" Released: 21 January 2020; 2. "Maragatha Maalai" Released: 31 January 2020; 3. "Nira" Released: 21 February 2020

The music for the film was composed by Nivas K. Prasanna. The first single, "Rainbow Thiralil" was released on 21 January 2020. The second single "Maragadha Maalai" was released on 31 January 2020. The third single, "Nira", was released on 27 February 2020. It is the first released song of singer Malvi Sundaresan.

Track listing
No.	Title	Lyrics	Singer(s)	Length
1.	"Rainbow Thiralil"	Arivarasan	Silambarasan, Andrea Jeremiah	4:20
2.	"Maragatha Maalai"	Uma Devi	Pradeep Kumar, Vijay Yesudas, Chinmayi	5:45
3.	"Nira"	Ku Karthik	Sid Sriram, Gautham Vasudev Menon, Malvi Sundaresan	5:04
4.	"Goiyyaale"	Ku Karthik	Andrea Jeremiah	3:31
5.	"Saagiren"	Ku Karthik	Abhay Jodhpurkar, Shweta Mohan	4:26
6.	"Takkar Theme"	—	—	0:55
7.	"Nira – Reprise Version"	Ku Karthik	Siddharth, Ku Karthik, Nivas K. Prasanna	4:53
Total length:				28:54

== Release ==
The film crew had earlier announced that the film would release on 17 April 2020, but it was postponed due to the COVID-19 pandemic. It was released on 9 June 2023.

=== Home media ===
The film began streaming on Netflix from 7 July 2023.

=== Reception ===
Logesh Balachandran of The Times of India gave the film 2.5 out of 5 stars and wrote, "The genre shifts from action to romcom and romcom to action every ten minutes. The transition is not organic, and the sequences are bit forced." Janani K of India Today gave 1.5 out of 5 stars and wrote "Takkar is a film that should have come out in the 2000s. Director Karthik G Krish’s story is so redundant that you could guess every single plot twist miles ahead of its arrival."

Kirubhakar Purushothaman of The Indian Express rated 1 out of 5 stars and wrote, "After a lot of contrivances and bad writing, we find the hero and heroine eloping in a car with gangsters on their tails". A critic from Maalai Malar gave 2.75 out of 5 stars and wrote that Karthik G. Krish has moved the film by focusing on what kind of things money does in life. The critic said cast of the film is strong, but a bit more attention could have been paid to the screenplay, and there seems to be a slight sag in some places. Dinamalar gave 2.25 out of 5 stars and criticised the film.
