= Goodachari =

2018 Indian action spy thriller film

- Theatrical release poster
- Directed by: Sashi Kiran Tikka
- Screenplay by: Sashi Kiran Tikka; Adivi Sesh; Rahul Pakala; Abburi Ravi (guidance)
- Dialogues by: Abburi Ravi
- Story by: Adivi Sesh
- Produced by: Abhishek Nama; T. G. Vishwa Prasad; Vivek Kuchibotla; Abhishek Agarwal
- Starring: Adivi Sesh; Sobhita Dhulipala; Jagapathi Babu; Prakash Raj
- Cinematography: Shaneil Deo
- Edited by: Garry BH
- Music by: Sricharan Pakala
- Production companies: Abhishek Pictures; People Media Factory; Vista Dream Merchants
- Distributed by: AK Entertainments
- Release date: 3 August 2018 (India)
- Running time: 147 minutes
- Country: India
- Language: Telugu
- Budget: ₹6 crore
- Box office: est. ₹25 crore

Goodachari (transl. The Spy) is a 2018 Indian Telugu-language action spy film directed by Sashi Kiran Tikka, from a story by Adivi Sesh. The film stars Sesh, Sobhita Dhulipala, Jagapathi Babu and Prakash Raj, with Supriya Yarlagadda, Vennela Kishore, Anish Kuruvilla, Rakesh Varre and Madhu Shalini in supporting roles. The music was composed by Sricharan Pakala, while cinematography and editing were handled by Shaneil Deo and Garry BH.

Goodachari was released on 3 August 2018 to positive reviews and became a commercial success at the box office. Sesh, Tikka and Rahul Pakala won the Best Screenplay at Zee Cine Awards Telugu. The film is considered one of the "25 Greatest Telugu Films Of The Decade" by Film Companion. A sequel titled G2 is under development.

== Plot ==
Gopi's father, Raghuveer, is killed during a classified R&AW mission. His uncle Sathya, also a RAW agent, fakes their deaths and raises Gopi as Arjun Kumar. Arjun dreams of joining RAW but receives no response until his 175th application, where he mentions his father's name. He is recruited by "Trinetra," a secret wing of RAW. Despite Sathya's initial fears, Arjun joins and is briefed by Chief Damodar about Al-Mujahideen, a terrorist outfit led by the mysterious Rana. Arjun begins dating Sameera Rao, a Harvard psychology graduate. After bonding over their shared history of losing parents, Arjun reveals his true identity as Gopi to her.

However, Al-Mujahideen has infiltrated Trinetra and Arjun is unaware. He follows a terrorist named Hamza and obtains the code "1112," which Trinetra interprets as an attack scheduled for December 11. During his graduation, Arjun is designated "Agent 116," a top covert operative assisted by Nadia Qureshi and her technical lead, Shaam. At the ceremony, Arjun gifts Damodar a bottle of whiskey suggested by Sameera. Arjun soon realizes the code was "12 November" which is his graduation day. Trinetra founder's founder Acharya attends the ceremony, however, he is killed when his convoy is attacked. During the same time, Damodar dies also from the poisoned whiskey. Thus, Arjun is framed for the assassinations, and PMO issues a warrant on him. Sameera is killed in an Al-Mujahideen ambush, and Arjun escapes to Rajahmundry to find Sathya.

They deduce a mole exists within Trinetra. While Nadia and Shaam track him, Arjun discovers that Sameera's uncle was a handler. They confront him and he commits suicide. Arjun learns that Sameera's real name is Sameera Sheikh, an Al-Mujahideen agent sent to trap him. He flees to Chittagong, Bangladesh, where he meets colleague Leena Rajan. Together, they infiltrate an Al-Mujahideen headquarters. Arjun recovers training videos that reveal the terrorist leader Rana is his father, Raghuveer.

Sathya explains that 20 years ago, he discovered Raghuveer was a double agent. During a shootout, Raghuveer gets shot and falls into a river. Believing he is dead, Sathya goes into hiding with Gopi to protect him. However, Raghuveer survived and became Rana. In the present, Rana captures Sathya and leads Arjun to come to his base. Rana reveals he used Sameera to monitor Arjun and assassinated Trinetra's members to reclaim his son. He killed Sameera when she fell in love with Arjun and tried to protect him.

Rana prepares to flee with Sathya but Arjun reveals that Trinetra soldiers, who are secretly alerted by Nadia have arrived. During the final confrontation, Arjun remembers Damodar's advice to overcome his weaknesses. To save the mission and the nation, Arjun shoots and kills his father.

Later, Arjun identifies the mole within Trinetra: Shaam. Arjun had spotted a young Shaam in the terrorist training videos. Shaam was the one who poisoned the whiskey which killed Damodar and later also killed Sameera. Trinetra commandos execute Shaam. Though shaken, Arjun is encouraged by Nadia to remain in service. He reads a final, apologetic love letter from Sameera left in his locker.

In a mid-credits scene, Arjun, now operating as "Agent Gopi 116," continues his mission as spy in Russia.

== Cast ==
- Adivi Sesh as M. Gopi / M. Arjun Kumar alias Agent Gopi 116
  - Darshan as Young Gopi
- Sobhita Dhulipala as Dr. Sameera Rao / Dr. Sameera Sheikh
- Madhu Shalini as Agent Leena Rajan, batchmate of Gopi at Trinetra and later assigned to recoinnaisance at the Indian Embassy, at Dhaka, Bangladesh
- Jagapathi Babu as M. Raghuveer / Rana, Gopi's biological father, Al-Mujahideen's spy later leader
- Prakash Raj as Sathya, Gopi / Arjun's maternal uncle who later becomes his foster father; Damodar's friend
- Supriya Yarlagadda as Nadiya Qureshi
- Vennela Kishore as Shaam
- Anish Kuruvilla as Damodar
- Rakesh Varre as Mohammed Pasha, batchmate and rival of Gopi at Trinetra, later assigned to the safety and security of Hyderabad Trinetra's offices' including the security of Acharya, till he is in Hyderabad
- Ravi Prakash as Vijay
- Swaraj Rebbapragada as Acharya, the founder and head of Trinetra
- Preeti Singh as Uma Vishwanath, batchmate of Gopi, later assigned to recoinnaisance at the Indian Embassy, at Beijing, China
- Venkatesh Mummidi as Khan
- Irfan Sia as Ravi Varma, batchmate of Gopi, later assigned to support Naadiya Qureshi in Tactical
- Kanij Koirala as Hamza
- Geddam Srinivas as Krishna Babai / Rahmat Ali
- Ravi Myskar as Kishore Krishnamurthy, batchmate of Gopi, later assigned to support Naadiya Qureshi in Technical
- Mayank Parakh as Abdul Qadir
- Ramana Bhargava as Gokaraju, "Goks", former boss to Shaam later became a subordinate to him.
- Silver Suresh as Ramayya

== Production ==
In 2017, debutant director Sashi Kiran Tikka announced that he would be making a film with actor Adivi Sesh in the lead role with Sricharan Pakala as the music composer. Sesh stated that Gudachari 116 (1966) starring Krishna was the inspiration behind the film. Sesh approached Krishna for a cameo role in the film, however, Krishna turned it down but gave Sesh permission to re-use clips from his old films. Sesh plays Agent Gopi with the code number 116 as a tribute to the film Gudachari 116.

The first-look poster of the film was released on 13 January 2018 coinciding with Sankranthi festival.

== Soundtrack ==
The soundtrack of Goodachari consists of seven tracks, all of which were composed by Sricharan Pakala.

Goodachari

Soundtrack album by Sricharan Pakala
- Released: 31 July 2018
- Recorded: 2018
- Genre: Feature film soundtrack
- Length: 22:21
- Language: Telugu
- Label: Aditya Music
- Producer: Sricharan Pakala

Sricharan Pakala chronology
Humble Politician Nograj (2018)	Goodachari (2018)	Idam Jagath (2018)

Track-List
No.	Title	Lyrics	Singer(s)	Length
1.	"Anaganaga"	Ramesh Yadma	Ambika Sashittal	02:40
2.	"Sakhiya"	Kittu Vissapragada	Sricharan Pakala, Yamini Ghantasala	03:30
3.	"Hatha"	Ramesh Yadma	Lalith Chilukuri	02:42
4.	"Goodachari Main Theme"	-	Sricharan Pakala	02:57
5.	"Goodachari Theme"	-	Sricharan Pakala	05:15
6.	"Gopi Redemption"	-	Sricharan Pakala	04:12
7.	"Rana Theme"	-	Sricharan Pakala	00:57
Total length:				22:21

== Reception ==
=== Critical reception ===
The Times of India gave the film 4/5 stars and wrote, "Goodachari proves what Tollywood can do, if only it makes different choices and dreams big. Filled with edge-of-the-seat moments and riveting twists, this one is the perfect popcorn entertainer." GreatAndhra gave it a rating of 3/5 and wrote, "'Goodachari' is a well-made spy thriller with right mix of suspense, action, and emotion." The Hindustan Times gave it 3/5 stars and wrote, "However, away from these obvious set-ups and spoon-fed moments, there is magic in this film." The Hindu wrote, "This coming-of-age story of a spy is a winner," and praised it for its racy screenplay.

Idlebrain.com's Jeevi gave it 3.25/5 stars and wrote, "Making a spy film in Telugu and making sure that it doesn't look pretentious is an achievement. With movie lovers having access to digital platforms and with all spy films (James Bond series, Kingsman, Mission Impossible, etc. in general and Paramanu, Raazi, etc. in particular) being available at no cost, it takes a lot of guts and ability for makers to select spy genre for a regional film. There are budget constraints too. The team has delivered a genuine spy action film that is engaging and which can stand on its own without drawing any comparisons with any other Hollywood film. Goodachari is different, yet commercial. You may watch it!" The News Minute praised it for its originality and said that it didn't run out of ideas. They wrote, "Goodachari is a movie that gives its audience its money's worth, and shows how we have not used up all possible roles where a veteran like Prakash Raj can add value!"

123telugu gave it 3.5/5 stars and said, "If Adivi Sesh's Kshanam gave a new edge to the thriller genre, Goodachari is a notch higher and showcases that there are makers in Tollywood who can dream big and make films on an international level. Goodachari is filled with edge-of-the-seat moments and riveting thrills which will keep you entertained. As the film is made on a compact budget, it will make merry at the box office because of its universal appeal. If you ignore the slightly slow second half, you can happily enjoy this popcorn thriller which is filled with ample twists and turns." Indiaglitz gave it 3.25/5 stars, saying that "'Goodachari' has the right mix: underplayed heroism, saleable emotions, thrilling twists, technical finesse, clap-worthy dialogue. Besides, it has got some of the coolest performances."

=== Box office ===
The film grossed ₹25 crore in its first weekend.

=== Home media ===
Film and digital rights are owned by Star Maa and Amazon Prime Video.

== Sequel ==
In December 2018, Sesh confirmed the film's sequel titled Goodachari 2, to be directed by debutant Rahul Pakala. The sequel was delayed by COVID-19 pandemic and in April 2020, Sesh confirmed writing script for Goodachari 2 (titled as G2). In June 2022, Sesh stated that script work is yet to be finished. He also confirmed that the sequel would be a continuation of the first part. The sequel, G2, was officially announced on 29 December 2022. It will be directed by Vinay Kumar Sirigineedi, the editor of Major, and produced by T. G. Vishwa Prasad, Abhishek Agarwal, and Anil Sunkara.
