= Appudo Ippudo Eppudo =

2024 Indian Telugu-language film by Sudheer Varma

- Theatrical release poster
- Directed by: Sudheer Varma
- Written by: Sudheer Varma
- Produced by: B. V. S. N. Prasad
- Starring: Nikhil Siddhartha; Rukmini Vasanth; Divyansha Kaushik
- Cinematography: Richard Prasad
- Edited by: Naveen Nooli
- Music by: Score; Sunny M. R. Songs; Karthik; Sunny M. R.
- Production company: Sri Venkateswara Cine Chitra
- Release date: 8 November 2024
- Running time: 122 minutes
- Country: India
- Language: Telugu

Appudo Ippudo Eppudo (transl. Then, now, whenever) is a 2024 Indian Telugu-language action comedy film written and directed by Sudheer Varma, and produced by B. V. S. N. Prasad through Sri Venkateswara Cine Chitra. The film features Nikhil Siddhartha, Rukmini Vasanth and Divyansha Kaushik in important roles. The film is named after the song of the same name in Bommarillu (2006).

The film was released on 8 November 2024 to negative reviews from critics.

== Plot ==
Rishi's dream is to become a racer. In the process, he meets Tara, but unfortunately, their love meets no end. So, he reaches London to get trained for racing, where he meets Tulasi and they fall in love. However, on the day of the marriage, Tulasi disappears. Who is behind Tulasi's disappearance, who is local don Bardrinarayana, and how Rishi unfolds the threads forms the rest of the story.

== Cast ==
- Nikhil Siddhartha as Rishi
- Rukmini Vasanth as Tara
- Divyansha Kaushik as Tulasi / Chumbana
- John Vijay as Badri Narayana
- Ajay as Munna
- Harsha Chemudu as Balaji "Yaaji"
- Satya as Thief 1
- Sudharshan as Thief 2
- Anaswi
- Rajesh Vulli
- Sriram
- Sagar
- Surya Varma

== Music ==
The background score is composed by Sunny M. R., whereas soundtrack is composed by Karthik and Sunny M. R. The audio rights were acquired by Junglee Music.

Track list
No.	Title	Lyrics	Music	Singer(s)	Length
1.	"Hey Taara"	Krishna Chaitanya	Karthik	Karthik, Nithyashree	4:11
2.	"Neetho Ila"	Rakendu Mouli	Karthik	Karthik, Nithyashree	4:09
3.	"Kabhi Haa Kabhi Naa"	Krishna Chaitanya	Sunny M. R.	Manisha Eerabathini, Krishna Tejasvi, Sunny M. R.	3:55

== Release ==
Appudo Ippudo Eppudo was originally scheduled to release in the Deepawali weekend, but was ultimately released on 8 November 2024 due to multiple film releases. Amazon Prime Video has acquired the post-theatrical digital streaming rights and premiered on 27 November 2024.

== Reception ==
Giving a rating of 2 out of 5, OTTPlay, Avad Mohammad stated "Appudo Ippudo Eppudo is an outdated crime drama that lacks basic thrill. Right from the actors to the narration, everything is dull, boring, and silly". BVS Prakash of Deccan Chronicle gave a negative review citing it as a "boring and painful watch". Echoing the same, Telugucinema.com stated that, "The film exemplifies lousy writing and outdated direction".
