= Dohchay =

2015 film written and directed by Sudheer Varma

- Theatrical release poster
- Directed by: Sudheer Varma
- Written by: Sudheer Varma
- Produced by: B. V. S. N. Prasad
- Starring: Naga Chaitanya; Kriti Sanon
- Cinematography: Richard Prasad
- Edited by: Karthika Srinivas
- Music by: Sunny M. R.
- Production company: Sri Venkateswara Cine Chitra
- Release date: 24 April 2015
- Running time: 136 minutes
- Country: India
- Language: Telugu

Dohchay (transl. Steal) is a 2015 Indian Telugu-language crime comedy film written and directed by Sudheer Varma and produced by B. V. S. N. Prasad under the banner Sri Venkateswara Cine Chitra. The film stars Naga Chaitanya and Kriti Sanon with Brahmanandam, Ravi Babu, Posani Krishna Murali, and Pooja Ramachandran in supporting roles. Sunny M.R. composed the music for the film.

The film was officially launched at Hyderabad on 12 June 2014, and principal photography began on 14 July 2014. The film was released on 24 April 2015.

== Plot ==
Two masked bandits commit a take-over style armed bank robbery, seizing a local bank at gunpoint and stealing ₹2 crore (US$210,000) from the premises. However, after the bank robbers escape, they have a misunderstanding when they discuss whether they should give the money to their boss or run away with it. They both hold each other at gunpoint, blank. Chandu is a small-time happy-go-lucky conman with a good heart, who cons people to educate his sister to become a doctor. They are also in league with a corrupt cop named CI Richard, who demands a cut in everything they do in return for keeping them out of the authorities's radar. Chandu's sister wants to become a doctor and Chandu is arranging the money for her studies.

One day, Chandu meets Meera, a fellow student in the same college as his sister. They start off as friends and eventually fall in love. Chandu's father is suffering from a heart ailment, is in prison, who suffers a heart attack and has to go to the hospital. Chandu has to pay 500,000 for the operation. He has a scheme and steals the money from a drug dealer, so the operation is a success. However, during the course of conning the drug dealer, Chandu is noticed by Richard, who is suspicious of him, but cleverly manages to escape and fools Richard into thinking that he had not done any job recently. However, Richard is still suspicious and decides to keep a close eye on him. Chandu also learns that the minister's PA can get his father out of jail by treating it as a particular case citing his father's health condition.

Chandu fixes an appointment with the PA at a new apartment complex where the PA has bought a flat. When Chandu goes to meet the PA, he accidentally goes into the adjacent flat where the thieves hold the guns and eventually shoot each other Chandu steals the money. However, while escaping from there, Chandu is noticed by two men while getting into an auto-rickshaw. The two men are in league with the robbers and had come to the flat to collect the stolen money from them. Upon seeing the dead bodies in the flat, they quickly make it out on to the road just as Chandu leaves in an auto-rickshaw. They note down the registration number of the auto but unfortunately lose sight in the traffic. Chandu then goes to pick up his sister from her college in the same auto and leaves for the hospital where his father is being treated. Chandu later explains to Meera about his past.

Past: Chandu's mother was sick, and his father, who was a taxi driver, took care of him and his sister. A man, hires him to take him to a faraway village, to meet an acquaintance, and the father takes his kids too, who sleep off in the backseat. There is money in the taxi's trunk that the passenger puts there. Upon reaching the destination, the passenger drops off to meet his acquaintance, named Manikyam. Manikyam, however, kills the passenger and then blames it on Chandu's father by bribing the cops. The cops recover the money from Chandu's father's car and then proceed to arrest him. Eventually, Chandu's mother dies, and he and his sister go into an orphanage, but they soon escape. There he meets a friend, and together they form a gang of thieves and start performing small-time robberies and con jobs.

Present: Manikyam, who is revealed to be the boss of the bank robbers, tracks down Chandu and his sister. Finding out that Chandu has the money, Manikyam kidnaps Chandu's father and sister and demands the two crores, which Chandu no longer possesses. Chandu comes up with a con to get the money. Chandu and Meera use Bullet Babu, an actor, as their target. Bullet Babu, a has-been in desperate need of a hit, has invested almost everything he has in a movie and is told that he still needs to pitch in more money. He also has a significant flaw which is that he always ends up having a crush on all good-looking girls. Chandu gets Meera to meet him under a false pretext providing him with a false story that his great-grandparents owned land that is worth 40 or 500 million, and he is the only known claimant.

However, Chandu will have to pay a processing fee of ₹4 crore (US$420,000). Bullet Babu believes this. However, Richard, who has been following Chandu, discovers that Chandu has a new protege – Meera where he goes to her house and blackmails that he will trap her in a false case. Panicked, Meera tells him the complete job details and that the registration for the land will be in Gandipet. Richard meets Bullet Babu and tells him that he is being duped. He tells him to take ₹4 crore (US$420,000) so that Richard can catch Chandu red-handed. In order to make this happen, he provides Bullet Babu with ₹4 crore (US$420,000) from his own pocket. If the plan works out, then Bullet Babu can claim back the money and return them to Richard. Bullet Babu agrees and goes for registration. As Bullet Babu goes into the office, Chandu and his friends threaten to kill him, and they empty the bag of money and stuff it in their pockets.

They make off with the money in a car, and a car chase goes on between Richard and Chandu, where Chandu is completely surrounded. Richard gets his superior to witness the proceedings. He tells him the entire case details. Upon searching Chandu and his friends, the cops realize that Chandu has no money. Richard then claims that Bullet Babu can testify for him. However, he is left shocked when Bullet Babu testifies that he has no idea about what Richard is saying and has never met him. Later, Bullet Babu reveals to Richard that the scam was on Richard and that he was on the scam from the beginning. As per his deal with Chandu, the money would be shared equally between him and Chandu. It is also revealed that Meera took a video when Richard says that he will trap Meera in a false case. Richard gets suspended because of this video.

Finally, Chandu meets up with Manikyam but gets him arrested by cops, who are later revealed to be actors arranged by Chandu to arrest him. Chandu sets up a fake police station and a fake court and forces Manikyam to admit his crimes. Manikyam is later taken to a real court, having made him believe that the only way he can get a reduced sentence and escape capital punishment is to confess his crimes. In the actual court, Manikyam, still thinking that he was held and tried by the real cops and lawyers last time, admits to all his crimes where he is sentenced to prison. Chandu, his sister, and father, along with Meera unite and leave the court.

== Cast ==
- Naga Chaitanya as Chandrasekhar alias Chandu
- Kriti Sanon as Meera Varma (Voice dubbed by Chinmayi)
- Brahmanandam as Bullet Babu
- Ravi Babu as CI Richard
- Posani Krishna Murali as Manikyam, a ruthless don
- Pooja Ramachandran
- Bharath Raju as Thief
- Raghu Raju as Thief
- Tanya Sachdeva as Lalitha
- Rao Ramesh as Seetharam, Chandu's father
- Chalapathi Rao as Police Officer
- Saptagiri as Ranga
- Praveen as Chandu's friend
- Satya as Samba, Chandu's friend
- Priya as Chandu's mother (cameo)
- Sana as Meera's mother
- Viva Harsha as Manikyam's henchman
- Prabhas Sreenu as Bullet Babu's assistant
- Sudharshan as Chandu's friend
- Thagubothu Ramesh as drunk prisoner
- Nyra Banerjee in an item number

== Production ==
=== Development ===
In the end of April 2013, Sudheer Varma said in an interview that he would direct a star hero in his next film after his successful debut Swamy Ra Ra. In early October 2013 and in early January 2014, reports emerged that Sudheer Varma would direct Naga Chaitanya in his second film. In early June 2014, the project's existence was officially confirmed by a press release which also stated that B. V. S. N. Prasad would produce this film on Sri Venkateswara Cine Chitra banner while the technical crew of Swamy Ra Ra would be working on this film too. The film was officially launched at Film Nagar temple in Hyderabad on 12 June 2014.

In mid-August 2014, it was reported that the makers finalized the title Mayagadu, which translates to "conman", as the protagonist plays the role of a very sharp witted conman in this film. Naga Chaitanya, in an interview, said that the film is a mix of con drama and action. The film's title was speculated as Dorakadu in mid November 2014, though the makers denied it later. Another rumored title was Harilo Ranga Hari. Naga Chaitanya announced that the film's first look teaser would be launched on 22 November 2014 and the title was expected to be confirmed.

In early December 2014, the film's soundtrack was planned to be unveiled in January 2015 while the film was scheduled for a late February or early March 2015 release. The film was reported to be titled as Docheyi, though an official confirmation was awaited. Chaitanya later confirmed the title as Dohchay on 17 February 2015 through his Twitter page.

=== Casting ===
Naga Chaitanya played the role of a conman and sported a different hairdo for the film. Kriti Sanon was selected as the female lead in late May 2014 after participating in a photo shoot with Naga Chaitanya. A press release on the day of the film's launch confirmed that Brahmanandam, Posani Krishna Murali, and Rao Ramesh are a part of the film's cast, while Ravi Babu, Praveen, Pooja Ramachandran, and Satya were also selected for important roles in this film. In late August 2014, Kriti Sanon said in an interview to The Times of India that the script was young, modern and had its own style because of which she accepted the film when she got the script. Naga Chaitanya's looks in the film were unveiled on 18, 20 and 22 November 2014. Madhuurima was cast for an item number which comes as a prelude to a crucial situation in the film. Nikeesha Patel was initially approached for that song, which she refused, citing displeasure of similar offers.

=== Filming ===
In early June 2014, the regular shooting was planned to start from 2 July 2014. Later, it was postponed to 12 July 2014 and finally started two days later at Hyderabad. Filming continued after a small break from 7 August 2014. Kriti Sanon joined the film's sets in late August 2014 and a scene featuring Kriti entering a share auto and sitting beside the driver with a convoy of vehicles led by Naga Chaitanya following her was shot near HITECH City in Hyderabad. Weeks later, some action sequences were on Naga Chaitanya and some fighters at Aluminium factory in Hyderabad.

In mid-October 2014, the filming continued at Annapurna Studios. The film's climax on Naga Chaitanya, Viva Harsha and few other comedians was shot on 8 November 2014. During the teaser launch, it was confirmed that except the songs, the rest of the film's shoot had been completed. In late January 2015, Kriti Sanon revealed that all the songs and 90% of the film's shoot has been completed. A song on Naga Chaitanya and Kriti Sanon was shot at Thailand in early March 2015.

== Music ==
Dohchay

Soundtrack album by Sunny M.R.
- Released: 11 April 2015; Taj Deccan; Hyderabad
- Recorded: 2014–2015
- Genre: Soundtrack
- Length: 31:03
- Language: Telugu
- Label: Lahari Music
- Producer: Sunny M.R.

Sunny M.R. chronology
Rowdy Fellow (2014)	Dohchay (2015)	Bhale Manchi Roju (2015)
External audio
- Official Audio Jukebox on YouTube

Track list
No.	Title	Lyrics	Artist(s)	Length
1.	"Nachhithe Ye Panaina"	Krishna Kanth	Arijit Singh	3:31
2.	"Okkariki Okkaram"	Sri Mani	Shalmali Kholgade, Nivas	3:29
3.	"Raana"	Krishna Kanth	Arijit Singh	3:57
4.	"Haayi Haayi"	Krishna Chaitanya	Arijit Singh	3:20
5.	"Aanati Devadasu"	Krishna Chaitanya	Sunny M.R., Shalmali Kholgade	3:53
6.	"What is this Bossu"	Krishna Chaitanya	Andony Dasan, Sunny M.R.	3:03
7.	"He is Mr. Mosagaadu"	Krishna Kanth	Arijit Singh	3:15
8.	"Dohchay"	Krishna Chaitanya	Shalmali Kholgade, Sunny M.R.	3:21
9.	"Villain"	Krishna Chaitanya	Parthasarathy	3:14
Total length:				31:03

== Release ==
Dohchay released on 24 April 2015. The streaming Rights were sold to ZEE5 and television rights sold to Zee Telugu and premiered on 17th June 2015.

== Reception ==
=== Critical response ===
Hemanth Kumar writing for The Times of India gave the three stars out of 5, stating that "Despite having all the elements, it just doesn't add up to make a fine film".
