= Tamasha with Harsha =

Indian talk show

- Genre: Talk show
- Developed by: Allu Aravind
- Written by: Hriday Ranjan; Hari Babu; Shalini Kondepudi; Rajshekar Mamidanna
- Directed by: Sarath Chandra Prasad
- Creative directors: Satyadev Chada; Srividya Palaparthi
- Presented by: Harsha Chemudu
- Theme music composer: Saketh Komanduri
- Country of origin: India
- Original language: Telugu
- No. of seasons: 1
- No. of episodes: 8

Production
- Executive producer: Sarat Ankit Nadiminti
- Producer: Vandana Bandaru
- Production locations: Hyderabad, Telangana, India
- Editor: V. Kiranmayee
- Camera setup: Multi-camera
- Production companies: Geetha Arts; Infinitum Media

Original release
- Network: aha
- Release: 6 November – 25 December 2020

Tamasha With Harsha is an Indian Telugu-language comedy talk show hosted by Harsha Chemudu Directed by Sarath Chandra Prasad and created by Allu Aravind for Aha, the show premiered on 6 November 2020. It is the first talk show that got streamed on Aha.

== Concept ==
A laugh-out-loud dose of tamasha, hosted by Harsha Chemudu as he interacts with celebs and roasts them savagely and hilariously. High on energy, fun banter and in his style, a complete laugh riot. A new episode airs every Friday.

== Production ==
The show was announced in August 2020.

== Episodes ==
Navdeep and Niharika Konidela are the first guests to enter the show followed by Suhas, Sandeep Raj, Kartikeya Gummakonda, Payal Rajput, Satya, Sudarshan, Raj Tarun, Chandini Chowdary, Siddu Jonnalagadda, Ravikanth Perepu, Aditya Mandala, Sumanth, Nandita Swetha, Anand Deverakonda and Varsha Bollamma.

Episode	Premiere	Guest(s)
1	6 November 2020	Navadeep, Niharika Konidela
2	13 November 2020	Suhas, Sandeep Raj
3	20 December 2020	Payal Rajput, Kartikeya Gummakonda
4	27 December 2020	Satya. Sudarshan
5	4 December 2020	Raj Tarun, Chandini Chowdary
6	11 December 2020	Siddu Jonnalagadda, Ravikanth Perepu, Aditya Mandala
7	18 December 2020	Sumanth, Nandita Swetha
8	25 December 2020	Varsha Bollamma, Anand Devarakonda

== Reception ==
Writing about the talk show, 123Telugu stated that: "Harsha is quite good with his hosting skills and is quite witty as well."
