= Ravanasura =

2023 Telugu film by Sudheer Varma

- Theatrical release poster
- Directed by: Sudheer Varma
- Written by: Original Story: Rudranil Ghosh; Srijit Mukherji; Screenplay: Sudheer Varma; Adapted Story & Dialogues: Srikanth Vissa
- Based on: Vinci Da (2019)
- Produced by: Abhishek Nama; Ravi Teja
- Starring: Ravi Teja; Jayaram; Sushanth; Anu Emmanuel; Faria Abdullah; Megha Akash; Daksha Nagarkar
- Cinematography: Vijay Kartik Kannan; Additional Cinematography: Prasad Murella; G. K. Vishnu
- Edited by: Naveen Nooli
- Music by: Harshavardhan Rameshwar; Bheems Ceciroleo (1 Song)
- Production company: Abhishek Pictures
- Release date: 7 April 2023
- Running time: 140 minutes
- Country: India
- Language: Telugu
- Budget: ₹50 crore
- Box office: ₹23.1 crore

Ravanasura (transl. The Demon Ravana) is a 2023 Indian Telugu-language psychological action thriller film directed by Sudheer Varma from a story written by Srikanth Vissa. It is a remake of the 2019 Bengali film Vinci Da by Srijit Mukherji starring Rudranil Ghosh and Ritwick Chakraborty. It has an ensemble cast featuring Ravi Teja, Jayaram, Sushanth, Anu Emmanuel, Faria Abdullah, Megha Akash, Daksha Nagarkar and Pujita Ponnada. Besides acting, Ravi Teja also produced the film under RT Team Works along with Abhishek Nama's Abhishek Pictures.

Ravanasura was released on 7 April 2023, where it received negative reviews from critics and was a commercial failure.

== Plot ==
Ravindra "Ravi" is a junior lawyer working under his ex-girlfriend Kanaka Mahalakshmi, who mostly goofs up the cases. He is also friends with Kanaka's husband Sekhar, who is the AG of Telangana. One day, Harika Talwar, who is the R&D head of Syncox Pharma, asks Ravi to prove her father Vijay Talwar's innocence, as he was framed for the death of Radhakrishna Chennuri, the FDA chairman. Ravi investigates the case and finds no concrete evidence against Vijay, such as DNA samples from the crime scene that match Vijay's, but does this to impress Harika and convinces the prosecutor of the same.

However, ACP Hanumanth Rao is asked to lead the investigation into Radhakrishna's death and suspects that Vijay is being framed. His team finds a similar case involving a celebrity's death. Hanumanth asks Goli Pahelwan, a famed rowdy who was present during the death of the celebrity, to describe what had happened during the night of the murder. Pahelwan says a man arrived at their house and took the measurements of the face and body for a statue at Madame Tussauds. They discover that the man is Saketh, a prosthetic makeup artist, and track him down to his house. When Hanumanth tries to arrest him, Pahelwan arrives and saves him. They both drive away and kill DIG Narasimha Murthy.

It is revealed that Ravi is wearing a prosthetic mask of Pahelwan and was responsible for the murders. Ravi kills Harika brutally by wearing the prosthetic mask of Sekhar. Then Sekhar gets arrested for murdering Harika. Ravi actually met Saketh during a case and was interested in his prosthetic faces. Ravi befriended Saketh and kidnapped his girlfriend Jaanu to blackmail him into making prosthetic faces. One day, Jaanu tried to flee from Ravi but met with an accident and went into a coma as a result. In the present, she wakes up in the hospital, where she tries to get help from doctors and other people, but to no avail. Suspicious of this, Dr. Dinesh informs Hanumanth that Ravi is closely guarding a girl. Hanumanth learns that Ravi is responsible for the murders and Saketh was making the prosthetic faces for him as he was being blackmailed.

Saketh calls and informs Hanumanth that Ravi is wearing Dinesh's face and is arriving to kill him, but Dinesh is later killed, and Ravi escapes. Saketh is asked to make a prosthetic face of Sekhar. Ravi uses this face and heads to Harika's house, where he brutally murders her, and Sekhar gets arrested. Disgusted with Ravi's actions, Saketh tries to escape and free Jaanu but is caught by Ravi. He reveals the motive behind the murders to Saketh and Hanumanth. Ravi's father Ramachandra had suffered from an ailment, and he met Dr. Shanthi, who was treating him. She found that Syncox Pharma had ties with the medical mafia, was involved in unethical human trials, and caused dementia in people with the use of their diabetic drug.

Being the masterminds behind the human trials, Harika, Vijay, and Home Minister Mudi Reddy took the help of Sekhar, Narasimha Murthy, Pahelwan, and Dinesh to kill Shanthi and cover their tracks. They brutally rape her in the saying of Harika and later kill her. Enraged, Ravindra began to target those responsible for Shanthi's death. Realizing this, Saketh agrees to help Ravi in his mission. Finally, Ravi kills Mudi Reddy at a political gathering, places the blame on the latter's henchman Devaraju, and closes the case. After this, he lets Saketh and Jaanu go, apologizing and thanking them for how he treated them and lives happily with his girlfriend-turned-wife, Keerthana.

== Cast ==
- Ravi Teja as Advocate Ravinder
- Jayaram as ACP Hanumanth Rao IPS
- Sushanth as Saketh, a prosthetic makeup artist
- Megha Akash as Harika Talwar, R&D head of Syncox Pharma
- Faria Abdullah as Advocate Kanaka Mahalakshmi, Sekhar's wife and Ravi's court senior
- Anu Emmanuel as Keerthana, Ravi's girlfriend
- Pujita Ponnada as SI Ruhana, Hanumanth Rao's trusted assistant
- Daksha Nagarkar as Janaki/Jaanu, Saketh's girlfriend
- Akshara Nunna as Hanumanth Rao's daughter
- Sriram as Advocate Sekhar Mukund, AG of Telangana, Kanaka Mahalakshmi's husband
- Sampath Raj as Vijay Talwar, Harika's father
- Murali Sharma as DIG Narasimha Murthy
- Rao Ramesh as Home Minister Mudi Reddy
- Nithin Mehta as Goli Pahelwan
- Navya Swamy as Dr. Shanthi, Ramachandra's doctor
- Vijayakumar as Ramachandra, Ravi's father
- Jayaprakash as Radhakrishnan Chennuri, FDA chairman
- Sritej as Devaraju, Mudi Reddy's henchman
- Bharath Reddy as Dr. Dinesh
- Hyper Aadi as Advocate Babji, Ravi's colleague and Kanaka's court junior
- Kalyani Natarajan as Santhi, Hanumanth Rao's wife
- Harsha Vardhan as Prosecutor
- Praveen as Ruhana's colleague
- Ajay Rathnam as Chief Minister
- Rajkumar Kasireddy as Pahelwan's henchman
- Vadlamani Srinivas as SP Sadananda
- Edin Rose as item number in the song "Dikka Dishum"

== Production ==
The film which was announced on 5 November 2021 and got launched on 14 January 2022, The film's principal photography began in January 2022. It was released on 7 April 2023.

== Music ==
The music of the film is composed by Harshavardhan Rameshwar and Bheems Ceciroleo. The first single titled "Ravanasura Anthem" was released on 6 February 2023. The second single titled "Pyaar Lona Paagal" was released on 18 February 2023. The third single titled "Veyyinokka" was released on 15 March 2023. The fourth single titled "Dikka Dishum" was released on 22 March 2023.

Ravanasura track listing
No.	Title	Lyrics	Music	Singer(s)	Length
1.	"Ravanasura Anthem"	Traditional Song	Harshavardhan Rameshwar	Shanti People, Novlik, Harika Narayan, Harshavardhan Rameshwar	4:06
2.	"Pyaar Lona Paagal"	Kasarla Shyam	Harshavardhan Rameshwar	Ravi Teja	3:35
3.	"Veyyinokka"	Sirivennela Sitarama Sastry	Harshavardhan Rameshwar	Anurag Kulkarni	3:56
4.	"Dikka Dishum"	Kasarla Shyam	Bheems Ceciroleo	Swathi Reddy, Bheems Ceciroleo, Naresh Mamindla	3:24

== Release ==
=== Theatrical ===
The film is scheduled to release on 7 April 2023. Earlier in January 2022, the film was announced to release on September 30, 2022 but due to production delays it was postponed to 7 April 2023. The film has received an A certificate due to its violent content.

=== Home media ===
The satellite and digital streaming rights of the film were sold to Zee Telugu and Amazon Prime Video respectively. The film was premiered on Amazon Prime Video on 28 April 2023.

== Reception ==
Ravanasura received mixed to negative reviews from critics who praised Ravi Teja's performances, film score and cinematography, but criticized its screenwriting and predictability.

=== Critical response ===
Neeshita Nyayapati of The Times of India rated the film 2 out of 5 stars and wrote "Ravanasura has moments where it feels like it could be much more than a lukewarm attempt at a thriller. But those moments are so few and far in between". Janani K of India Today rated the film 2 out of 5 stars and wrote "There are many logical loopholes in the film and termed the murders in the film as "senseless with no logic".

Raghu Bandi of The Indian Express rated the film 2 out of 5 stars and wrote "Director Sudhir Varma fails to sustain the narrative as action takes over intrigue and suspense." Sakshi Post rated the film 2 out of 5 stars and wrote "Ravanasura had a lot of scope for story development. The half-baked story comes with poor execution. Don't go with expectations. Watch it only if you are a fan of Ravi Teja."
