= Om Bheem Bush =

2024 Indian film

- Theatrical release poster
- Directed by: Sree Harsha Konuganti
- Written by: Sree Harsha Konuganti
- Produced by: Sunil Balusu
- Starring: Preity Mukhundhan Sree Vishnu Priyadarshi Rahul Ramakrishna Srikanth Iyengar Ayesha Khan
- Cinematography: Raj Thota
- Edited by: Vijay Vardhan Kavuri
- Music by: Sunny M.R.
- Production companies: V Celluloid; VR Global Media
- Release date: 22 March 2024
- Running time: 142 minutes
- Country: India
- Language: Telugu
- Box office: ₹19 crore (US$2.0 million)

Om Bheem Bush is a 2024 Indian Telugu-language horror comedy film written and directed by Sree Harsha Konuganti and produced by Sunil Balusu under the banner V Celluloid. The film features Preity Mukhundhan, Sree Vishnu in a dual role, alongside Priyadarshi, Rahul Ramakrishna, Srikanth Iyengar, and Ayesha Khan in the lead roles. Music is composed by Sunny M.R and cinematography by Raj Thota. The film released theatrical on 22 March 2024 and was successful at the box office.

== Plot ==
In the fictional village of Bhairavapuram, friends Krish, Vinay, and Madhav explore the haunted Sampangi Mahal seeking hidden treasure. After arriving there, they disguise themselves as magicians and fixes all the problems of the villager, gaining their trust. In between that, Krish fall in love with the Sarpanch's daughter Jalaja, who is caged in her house by her toxic father. Krish helps Jalaja, thus gaining her love. They also befriends a cook named Ratthalu. Finally, the Sarpanch give Krish, Vinay and Madhav a quest to encounter the ghost of Sampangi, a noblewoman cursed to guard the palace's secrets. Facing perilous challenges, they uncover the tragic history behind Sampangi's plight. Through courage and friendship, they confront the ghost and find the treasure, discovering the true riches of redemption. Emerging from the ordeal, they leave with a profound understanding of love, loyalty and thought.

== Cast ==
- Preity Mukhundhan as Jalaja
- Sree Vishnu in a dual role as
  - Krishnakanth "Krish" Gundagani
  - Madhana Manoharudu
- Priyadarshi as Vinay Gummadi
- Rahul Ramakrishna as Madhav Relangi
- Ayesha Khan as Ratthalu
- Kamakshi Bhaskarla as Neha Sharma
- Srikanth Iyengar as Principal Ranjith Vinukonda
- Adithya Menon as Sarpanch
- Surya Sreenivas as Madhana Manoharudu
- Racha Ravi as Amavasa
- Manish Kumar as Sampangi
- Priya Vadlamani in an item number in "Bang Bros"

== Production ==
Principal photography commenced in late December 2022 and included a 15-day filming schedule in Hyderabad, which was followed by 20 days filming schedule in Pune and Kerala. The film marks the second collaboration between Sree Vishnu, Priyadarshi and Rahul Ramakrishna, after Brochevarevarura (2019).

== Soundtrack ==
Om Bheem Bush

Film score by Sunny M.R.
- Released: March 7, 2024
- Studio: Chordfather Productions
- Genre: Feature film soundtrack
- Language: Telugu
- Label: Aditya Music
- Producer: Sunny M.R.

Sunny M.R. chronology
3 Roses (2021)	Om Bheem Bush (2024)	Kahan Shuru Kahan Khatam (2024)

Official audio
- Om Bheem Bush Full Songs Jukebox on YouTube

The film background score and music was composed by Sunny M.R. Aditya Music acquired the audio rights. The song "Bang Bros" was released on 7 March 2024 and captures the predicaments of navigating youth and romance. This was followed by the second single titled "The Wedding Song", which was released on 17 March 2024. It communicates the rituals of traditional Indian weddings in a musical manner. The third single named "Dil Dhadke" combines romance and excitement and was released on 22 March 2024, coinciding with the film's theatrical release date. The remaining songs were released as part of the official jukebox on 24 March 2024.

Paul Nicodemus of The Times of India wrote that "Sunny MR’s music score harmonises with the film’s thematic currents, accentuating the emotional depth of the characters". On the other hand, Prakash Pecheti of South First stated that "The music in Om Bheem Bush, composed by Sunny MR, is not so exhilarating. The songs quickly fade from memory once they conclude".

No.	Title	Lyrics	Singer(s)	Length
1.	"Bang Bros"	Lakshmi Priyanka	Aditya Iyenger, Dinker Kalvala, Vivek Hariharan, Rutvik Talashilkar, Sunny M.R.	3:02
2.	"The Wedding Song"	Krishna Kanth	Kapil Kapilan	3:22
3.	"Dil Dhadke"	Krishna Kanth	Krishna Tejasvi, Sunny M.R.	3:03
4.	"Anuvanuvuu"	Krishna Kanth	Arijit Singh	3:34
5.	"Aparichitha"	Vinayak Sasikumar	Sithara Krishnakumar	4:17
6.	"Neeli Moha Megham"	Krishna Kanth	Anjana Balakrishnan	3:56
7.	"Thaalajaalane"	Krishna Kanth	Harjot Kaur	3:46
8.	"Ule Ule"	Lakshmi Priyanka	Ram Miriyala	1:47
9.	"Oka Kalalaa"	Krishna Kanth	Sunny M.R.	4:02

== Release ==
Om Bheem Bush was theatrically released on 22 March 2024, while the film premiered in the United States a day prior. The film received an A certification from the Central Board of Film Certification, whereas the British Board of Film Classification rated it "12A" and stated that Dreamz Entertainment Limited, the official overseas distributor of the film, cut a scene depicting substance misuse to achieve said rating.

=== Home media ===
The film's streaming rights were acquired by Amazon Prime Video, and the film started streaming from 12 April 2024.

== Reception ==
The Indian Express gave the film 2/5 stars and stated that "The film relies heavily on the camaraderie and improvised dialogues among Vishnu, Rahul, and Darshi. What unfolds is a delightful comedy, where every line is delivered with a punch".

Bvs Prakash of Deccan Chronicle gave the film 1.5/5 stars and stated that he "Agreed that it is meant to tickle the funny bones of the audience and the makers kept claiming that there is ‘no logic, only magic’ but it is bereft of any magic".
