= Priya Vadlamani =

Indian actress

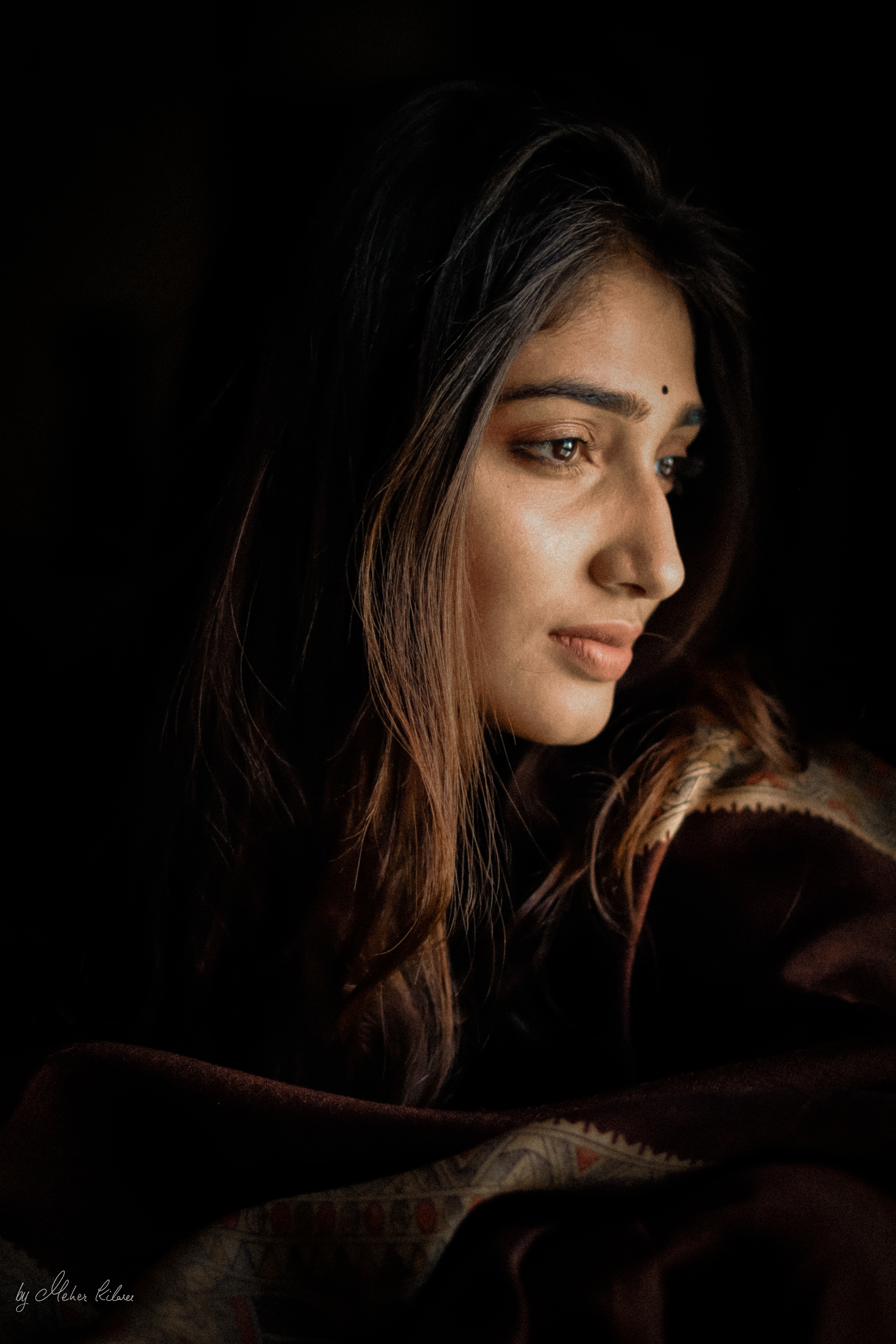
- Born: 27 August 2000 (age 26); Jabalpur, Madhya Pradesh, India
- Education: Christ University
- Occupation: Actress
- Years active: 2018–present

Priya Vadlamani is an Indian actress who appears in Telugu films. She started as a model and competed in Femina Miss India Hyderabad 2016. She later starred in the films Premaku Raincheck, Husharu and Mukhachitram.

== Early life ==
Priya Vadlamani was born in a Telugu family in Jabalpur, Madhya Pradesh and brought up in Hyderabad. She studied in Slate the school in Hyderabad. She then studied at Christ College, Bangalore. She started her career as assistant director.

== Filmography ==
Year	Title	Role	Notes	Ref.
2018	Premaku Raincheck	Ramya		
2018	Shubhalekhalu	Nitya		
2018	Husharu	Riya		
2019	Aaviri	Jhanvi		
2020	College Kumar	Avanthika	Simultaneously shot in Tamil	
2022	Mukhachitram	Mahathi/Maya		
2023	Manu Charitra	Sravya	Cameo appearance	
2024	Om Bheem Bush	Herself	Cameo appearance	
2024	Veeranjaneyulu Viharayatra	Sarayu		
2024	Viswam	Priya Satyardhi	Cameo appearance	
2025	Brahma Anandam	Tara		

=== Television ===
Year	Title	Role	Network	Ref.
2025	Sammelanam	Meghana	ETV Win	
