= Sammelanam (TV series) =

Indian Telugu-language webseries

- Genre: Romantic comedy
- Written by: Tharun Mahadev
- Directed by: Tharun Mahadev
- Music by: Saravana Vasudev
- Country of origin: India
- Original language: Telugu
- No. of seasons: 1
- No. of episodes: 6

Production
- Executive producer: Sharath V
- Producers: Sunayani B; Saketh J
- Cinematography: Sravan G Kumar
- Editor: Sravan G Kumar
- Production company: A Good Tale Cinema

Original release
- Network: ETV Win
- Release: 20 February 2025 – present

Sammelanam is an Indian Telugu-language romantic comedy television series written and directed by Tharun Mahadev. The series featured Priya Vadlamani and Ganaaditya in lead roles. It was premiered on 20 February 2025 on ETV Win.

== Cast ==
- Ganaaditya as Ram
- Priya Vadlamani as Meghana
- Vignay Abhishek as Arjun
- Jeevanpriya Reddy as Andallu, Rahul, and Shreyas' maid.
- Srikanth Gurram as Rahul
- Nuthakki Bindhu Bhargavi as Shreya
- Shivanth Yachamaneni

== Soundtrack ==
Track list
No.	Title	Lyrics	Music	Singer(s)	Length
1.	"Naalo"	Vanamali	Yashwanth Nag	Soujanya Bhagavatula	3:26

== Reception ==
Ramu Chinthakindhi of Times Now stated that " Overall, 'Sammelanam' is a film that appeals to the youth and is worth watching with the family." Hindustan Times wrote that "Finally, the Sammelanam web series, which has a total of six episodes, each about 25 to 30 minutes long, has a routine concept and gives a good feeling while watching it" and rated it two out of five.
