= Madhu Shalini =

Indian actress and model

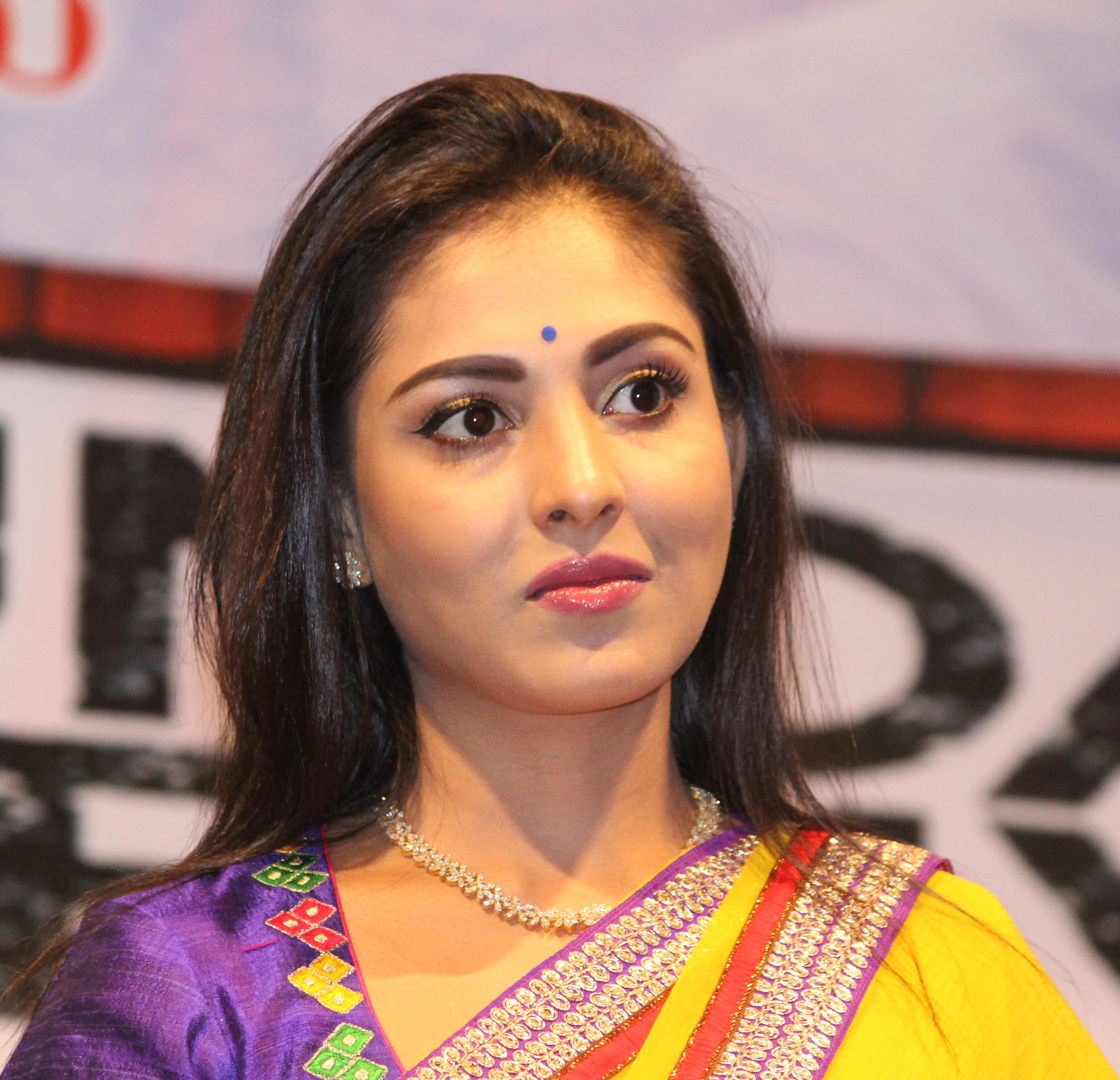
- Born: Hyderabad, Telangana, India
- Occupations: Actress; model; anchor
- Years active: 2005–present
- Spouse: Gokul Anand (m. 2022)

Madhu Shalini is an Indian actress and model who predominantly works in Telugu, Tamil and Hindi films. She won the title of Miss Andhra Pradesh in 2005. She hosted a television show Premakathalu after winning Dream Girl contest.

== Early life ==
Madhu Shalini was born in Hyderabad, India. Her father Hameed is a businessman and mother Polapragada Raj Kumari is an advocate and a classical dancer. Like her mother, she also learned Kuchipudi, before taking part in a beauty contest, which she won and which paved her way for a modelling career.

== Career ==
After working as a television anchor for a short while, she soon ventured into film business, turning an actress.

She made her feature film debut with the film, E. V. V. Satyanarayana's Kithakithalu, opposite Allari Naresh, released in 2006, which went on to become a very successful venture. The same year, she had appeared in two more Telugu films, namely Teja's Oka V Chitram as part of an ensemble cast, and Aganthakudu. In 2007, she starred in the Telugu action comedy State Rowdy, a remake of the successful Tamil K. S. Ravikumar-directorial Aethiree, with Madhu Shalini playing a Brahmin girl character, played by Kanika in the original. She made her Tamil film debut later that year with the low-budget feature Pazhaniappa Kalloori.

She later signed to play the lead female in D. Sabhapathy's Telugu project Happy Journey, while she also agreed to appear in the director's next Tamil venture, Pathinaaru, which, despite being heavily delayed, became her next release. Though the film received mixed reviews and fared averagely at the box office, Madhu Shalini's performance as Indhu received positive reviews, with critics citing that she performed her role "with consummate ease", was "adequate in her role", and acted "like a pro". Her subsequent release, Karalu Miriyalu, likewise, released to negative reviews, while her performance, however, met with favorable remarks from critics, with one reviewer claiming that she "looks pretty and dishes out a pleasing work", further noting that it was a pity that she does not get to work in any "big projects". She eventually got her big break as she was cast by noted National Film Award-winning filmmaker Bala for his comedy flick Avan Ivan. She disclosed that Bala selected her without even auditioning her, after numerous girls were auditioned for the role, with none of them measuring up to Bala's expectations. Madhu Shalini would play a college student in the film, for which she did not apply any makeup, while also dubbing for herself for the first time.

She made her Bollywood debut in Ram Gopal Varma's Department, that featured her as a gangster alongside Amitabh Bachchan, Sanjay Dutt and Rana Daggubati. She collaborated with Ram Gopal Varma again later that year on the horror flick Bhoot Returns and two years later on the psychological thriller Anukshanam. Madhu Shalini will be seen as a reporter in Gopala Gopala. Lastly, she was seen in the Tamil movie Thoongavanam as Esther, a nurse and as Seetha in Seethavalokanam.

== Personal life ==
Madhushalini married Tamil actor Gokul Anand on June 16, 2022, at the Taj Hotel in Hyderabad.

== Filmography ==
Key
†	Denotes films that have not yet been released

=== Films ===
Year	Title	Role(s)	Language(s)	Notes	Ref.
2005	Andarivaadu		Telugu		
2005	Naa Pranam Kante Ekkuva	Chandrika	Telugu		
2005	Nayakudu		Telugu	Special appearance	
2006	Kithakithalu	Rambha	Telugu		
2006	Oka V Chitram	Supraja	Telugu		
2006	Aganthakudu	Chitra	Telugu		
2007	State Rowdy	Vimala Sarma	Telugu		
2007	Pazhaniappa Kalloori	Malli	Tamil		
2007	Jagadam	Herself	Telugu	Special appearance	
2008	King	King's cousin	Telugu		
2011	Pathinaaru	Indhu	Tamil		
2011	Karalu Miriyalu	Shreya Aravind	Telugu		
2011	Avan Ivan	Thenmozhi	Tamil		
2012	Department	Naseer	Hindi		
2012	Bhoot Returns	Pooja	Hindi		
2012	Nagavalli Ra..Ra..	Rajeswari	Kannada	Dubbed into telugu as kalpana guest house	
2014	Bramman	Herself	Tamil	Special appearance	
2014	Anukshanam	Asha	Telugu		
2014	Poga		Telugu		
2015	Gopala Gopala	DD TV reporter	Telugu		
2015	Thoongaavanam	Esther	Tamil	Bilingual film	
2015	Cheekati Rajyam	Esther	Telugu	Bilingual film	
2017	Seethavalokanam	Seetha	Telugu		
2018	Goodachari	Leena Rajan	Telugu		
2019	Pancharaaksharam	Sameera	Tamil		
2019	Raktham – The Blood	Anisha	Telugu		
2022	Visithiran	Meenakshi	Tamil		
2027	G2 †	Agent Leena Rajan	Telugu		

=== Television ===
Year	Title	Role(s)	Language(s)	Platform
2020	Expiry Date	Sunita	Telugu; Hindi	ZEE5
2022	9 Hours	Chitralekha	Telugu	Disney+ Hotstar
