= Swag (film) =

2024 Indian film by Hasith Goli

- Theatrical release poster
- Directed by: Hasith Goli
- Written by: Hasith Goli
- Produced by: T. G. Vishwa Prasad
- Starring: Sree Vishnu; Meera Jasmine; Ritu Varma; Sunil; Daksha Nagarkar; Ravi Babu
- Cinematography: Vedaraman Sankaran
- Edited by: Viplav Nyshadam
- Music by: Vivek Sagar
- Production company: People Media Factory
- Release date: 4 October 2024
- Running time: 159 minutes
- Country: India
- Language: Telugu
- Box office: est. ₹8.05 crore

Swag is a 2024 Indian Telugu-language black comedy thriller film written and directed by Hasith Goli, and produced by People Media Factory. The film features Sree Vishnu in a five roles, alongside Ritu Varma, Meera Jasmine, Sunil, Daksha Nagarkar and Ravi Babu in supporting roles. The film was released on 4 October 2024. The film received mixed reviews from critics.

== Plot ==
During the 16th-century reign of Queen Rukmini Devi of the Vinjamara dynasty, her husband, King Bhavabhuti, fed up with the male oppression endured under the matriarchal rule, sought to assume control of the kingdom and transform it into a patriarchal society. With the support of the rajaguru, Bhavabhuti devised a plan requiring Rukmini Devi to give their son, Ajeya, his surname Swaganika instead of Vinjamara. Once this change was made, the transition to patriarchy followed, as Bhavabhuti belonged to the Swaganika dynasty. When the rajaguru documented Ajeya in the family tree, he expressed concern that Bhavabhuti's descendants might eventually not have any male heirs, leading to the extinction of the Swaganika clan. This was because a daughter would join another family upon marriage, due to the change in surname. Following a heated argument, Bhavabhuti and the rajaguru cursed each other, declaring that if the latter's descendants failed to record the male offspring of Bhavabhuti's lineage, both families would face the prospect of having no further male heirs.

In the present, SI Bhavabhuti is retiring from the police force and has been denied a pension due to complaints about his misconduct and his chauvinistic attitudes. Along with a few others, he receives letters from an anonymous sender claiming to be a descendant of the Swaganika clan, instructing recipients to visit the "Vamsa Vruksha Nilayam" (Family Tree Mansion) to claim the clan's wealth; the last known descendant, Yayathi, failed to ever register his children's names, leaving the legacy unclaimed. Maharishi, the current heir of the rajaguru, hopes that the descendant is a woman, as this would bring an end to the Swaganika clan and allow him to acquire the wealth through the conditions of the curse. Alongside Bhavabhuti, two others arrive at the mansion: Anubhuti, a cynical misandrist construction worker seeking funding for a new business, and Singareni "Singa", a jobless social media influencer who is unaware of his biological father. Astrologer Ekambaram predicts that Singa could attain success if he fathers a son in the future. He opposes this marriage later as he finds out that Singa's girlfriend is none other than his own daughter Kaluva, citing Singa's unemployment and moreso, his unknown father.

It is later revealed that the letters were sent by Vibhuthi, a transgender dancer who is Bhavabhuti's twin. Bhavabhuti arrests both Vibhuthi and Singa, prompting Vibhuthi to share her story with Singa and the other inmates. Yayathi, a 70s-era stage dancer whose family has fallen from prominence over the years, has seven daughters borne by his wife Kausalya. Yet he still longs for a son, believing his entry into the family tree will bring them wealth and happiness. Yayathi's friend Vasudeva is also trying for a son and has several daughters. Yayathi's wife, Kausalya, gives birth to twin boys - Dhanubhuti and Bhavabuti - upon which Yayathi gives the latter to Vasudeva to adopt. The descendant of the rajaguru, guarding the Swaganika wealth at this time, urges Yayathi to bring both twins for registration in the family tree, as his own male lineage is at risk if he doesn't fulfill his duties, as per the original curse. However, Vasudeva and his family discretely abandon town and set off for Kolkata, worried that Yayathi might reclaim his adoptee son in the future.

Years later, during his adolescence, Dhanubhuti begins to display feminine traits and develops a passion for classical dance. When Yayathi discovers this, he confronts Dhanubhuti and becomes concerned that having him in the family could jeopardize his daughters' marriage prospects. Consequently, Yayathi enrolls Vibhuthi in a dance class and skips town with the rest of the family, before Dhanubhuti returns home. However, Kausalya leaves behind a plate bearing the emblem of the Swaganika dynasty, which is necessary for her child's registration in the family tree and claiming of the wealth. Dhanubhuti eventually undergoes gender affirmation surgery, transitioning into Vibuthi, and becomes a celebrated yet ostracized Kathakalli dancer.

However, frustrated with society's mistreatment towards her, Vibhuthi once contemplated suicide. She then encountered Revathi, Bhavabhuti's pregnant wife, alone in a bus and experiencing labour pains. Vibhuthi assists Revathi in delivering a baby boy, who turned out to be Singa. Told through intermittent flashbacks, Bhavabhuti and Revathi share a loving relationship in 90s Vizag - with Revathi working as a college teacher, advocating for gender equality and the importance of education. However, underneath the surface of this romantic couple, was later revealed Bhavubhuti's discrete maliciousness. Whenever Revathi became pregnant and the fetus was female, Bhavabhuti spiked her with abortion medication. After multiple miscarriages, when Revathi was finally expecting Singa, the doctor expressed concern that Bhavabhuti might have been responsible for her previous abortions. Consequently, when they discovered the child was a boy, Revathi fled from Bhavabhuti, unable to reconcile her beliefs with his views, convinced he would never change - thus ending up on the bus where she was found by Vibuthi.

After Revathi left with Singa, Vibhuthi, longing to be a mother herself, adopted Anubhuti from an orphanage. However, due to bullying at school linked to her mother's transgender identity, Anubhuti developed a hostile attitude toward Vibhuthi and dreamed of escaping her after starting her own business. This deeply saddened Vibhuthi, who wrote the anonymous letters that gathered her family, including Yayathi and Vasudeva, in one place. There, she was registered as the heir of the Swaganika clan, and ready to declare herself as a male for the sake of completing the ceremony. However, Vibhuthi chose to prioritize her self-respect and decided to provide Anubhuti with the family and wealth she desired. She handed Revathi's letter to Singa as she left. Yayathi acknowledged Vibhuthi as his daughter, leading to a reconciliation between her and Anubhuti. Singa gave the letter to Bhavabhuti, suggesting it might contain some final words of love from Revathi, who had died long ago. Bhavabhuti, upon reading Revathi's last message, realized how lonely he had become and broke down in tears.

Ultimately, it was revealed that the Swaganika wealth was used to establish an educational institution that offered free education for all genders, where Anubhuti and Vibhuthi taught dance, and Bhavabhuti served as the principal. Singa becomes a responsible man and marries Kaluva. He later becomes a father and embraces his child, without worrying about his child's gender.

== Cast ==
- Sree Vishnu in quintuple role as
  - King Bhavabhuthi Swaganika
  - SI Valasala Bhavabhuthi
  - Vibhuthi (Dhanubhuthi)
  - Yayathi
  - Singareni "Singa"
- Meera Jasmine in dual role as
  - Queen Uthphalaa Devi
  - Revathi, wife of SI Valasala Bhavabhuti
- Ritu Varma in a dual role as
  - Queen Vinjamara Rukmini Devi
  - Sagunuka Anubhuti, the adopted daughter of Vibhuthi
- Daksha Nagarkar in a dual role as
  - Vasundhara Devi
  - Kaluva, girlfriend and eventually, wife of Singa
- Sharanya Pradeep in a dual role as
  - Dakshayani
  - Kausalya
- Goparaju Ramana in a dual role as
  - Rajaguru
  - Maharshi
- Sunil as Valasala Vasudeva
- Vennela Kishore as Chinna Raju
- Vadivukkarasi as Vijjamma
- Ravi Babu as Chinnayana
- Getup Srinu as Michael, Singa's friend
- Rajyalakshmi as Yayati's mother-in-law
- Ashok Kumar as Sripathi
- Kireeti Damaraju as Nishkalmasha
- Kamal Kamaraju as Vasu
- Gangavva as Head of Cheli Kathalu
- Ajay as Shankar
- Anand Bharathi as Kalavar
- Prudhvi Raj as Ekambaram, Kaluva's father
- Kadambari Kiran as Main employee at Vamsa Vruksha Nilayam
- Vasu Inturi as B. Daveedu
- Satya as Babaji
- Ashok Kumar as Sripathi
- Sunaina Badam as anchor
- Shivakumar Ramachandravarapu as Visesh
- Bindu Chandramouli as a Government employee
- Harsh Roshan in a dual roles as
  - Teen Bhavabhuthi
  - Teen Dhanubhuthi (Vibhuthi)

== Music ==
Swag

Soundtrack album by Vivek Sagar
- Released: 2024
- Recorded: 2024
- Language: Telugu
- Label: Tips Industries
- Producer: Vivek Sagar

The film's soundtrack album and background score are composed by Vivek Sagar.

All music is composed by Vivek Sagar.

Track list
No.	Title	Lyrics	Singer(s)	Length
1.	"Singaro Singa"	Niklesh Sunkoji	Baba Sehgal, Vaikom Vijayalakshmi	3:20
2.	"Guvva Gootilo"	Bhuvana Chandra	Mano, Geetha Madhuri, Snigdha Sharma	4:19
3.	"Englandu Rani"	Swaroop Goli	Kailash Kher	4:02
4.	"Neelo Naalo"	Bhuvana Chandra	Rajesh Krishnan, Anjana Sowmya (additional vocals by Shrutika Samudrala)	4:35
5.	"Sandamaama"	Ramajogayya Sastry	Rhithwik S. Chand	4:54
6.	"Thandava Roopam"	Jonnavittula Ramalingeswara Rao	Kalpana Raghavendar	4:00

== Release ==
Swag was released on 4 October 2024. Post-theatrical digital streaming rights were acquired by Amazon Prime Video and premiered on 25 October 2024.

== Reception ==
Sangeetha Devi Dundoo of The Hindu gave a positive review with particular praise to Hasith Goli, and the performances of Sree Vishnu, Ritu Varma and Meera Jasmine. She further wrote that, "There are times when the multiple timelines and characters can feel tiresome. But ultimately, it finds its rhythm and can leave you with a smile". Eenadu opined that the confused story and screenplay are the major negatives, while the performances of Sree Vishnu, Meera Jasmine and Ritu Varma is the major positive of the film.
