= Bakasura Restaurant =

2025 Indian Telugu film by SJ Shiva

- Theatrical release poster
- Directed by: SJ Shiva
- Written by: SJ Shiva
- Produced by: Lakshmaiah Achari; Janardhan Achari
- Starring: Praveen; Harsha Chemudu; Jai Krishna; Vivek Dandu; Amar Lathu; Ram Patas; Shining Phani
- Cinematography: Bala Saraswathi
- Edited by: Marthand K. Venkatesh
- Music by: Vikas Badisa
- Production company: SJ Movies
- Release date: 8 August 2025
- Running time: 158 minutes
- Country: India
- Language: Telugu
- Budget: ₹ 5 crore

Bakasura Restaurant is a 2025 Indian Telugu-language horror comedy film written and directed by SJ Shiva. The film features an ensemble cast of Praveen, Harsha Chemudu, Jai Krishna, Vivek Dandu, Amar Lathu, Ram Patas and Shining Phani.

The film was released on 8 August 2025.

== Plot ==
Paramesh is a software employee who dreams of opening his own restaurant. He lives with four friends - Vaman, Sai, Palli, and Bhargav - and starts saving money to make his dream come true. Vaman wants to be a filmmaker, while the other friends have no clear goals and depend on Paramesh's income. When things don't go their way, the group turns to making ghost-hunting videos for YouTube to earn quick money. During one of their shoots at a palace, they discover a book related to black magic (Tantra shastra). The story takes a supernatural turn when groceries start vanishing overnight from their home, no matter where they hide them. Something unseen and hungry is lurking in the kitchen. A wish made by the five youngsters leads them to unveil a supernatural force lurking around them.

== Cast ==
- Praveen as Paramesh
- Harsha Chemudu as Bakka Suri "Bakasura"
- Jai Krishna as Palli
- Vivek Dandu as Vamana
- Amar Lathu as Sai
- Ram Patas as Bhargav
- Shining Phani as Anji
- Ramya Priya as Varsha
- Prachi Thakur as Mounika
- Ramachandra Raju
- Krishna Bhagavan as Hotel Manager
- Srikanth Iyengar as Chakravarthy
- Jabardasth Apparao
- Tenali Shakuntala as Suramma

== Music ==
The background score and soundtrack were composed by Vikas Badisa. The first song "Jathiyam" was released on 29 May 2025.

All music is composed by Vikas Badisa.

No.	Title	Lyrics	Singer(s)	Length
1.	"Jathiyam"	Vishnu Vardhan	Anurag Kulkarni	3:09
2.	"Ayyo Emira Ee Jeevitham"	Vishnu Vardhan	Rahul Sipligunj	4:07
3.	"Velipothunte Sneham"	Vishnu Vardhan	Vikas Badisa	3:51
4.	"Bakasura"	Roll Rida	Roll Rida, Vikas Badisa	3:05

== Release and reception ==
Bakasura Restaurant was released on 8 August 2025. It was later released on Amazon Prime Video and Sun NXT on 8 September.

The Times of India wrote "Bakasura Restaurant entertains in patches and features a few engaging performances, but the execution never quite matches the freshness of its premise". OTTPlay mentioned that the film is "a horror comedy that works in parts. It starts on a very interesting note and has good comedy". Andhra Jyothi rated the film 2.5 out of 5 and echoed the same.
