= Hora Hori =

2016 film by Teja

- Theatrical release poster
- Directed by: Teja
- Written by: Teja
- Produced by: K. L. Damodara Prasad
- Starring: Dileep Reddy; Daksha Nagarkar; Chaswa; Aberaam Varma
- Cinematography: Deepak Bhagavanth
- Music by: Kalyani Malik
- Distributed by: Suresh Productions
- Release date: 11 September 2015
- Running time: 123 minutes
- Country: India
- Language: Telugu

Hora Hori (Fight for Love) is a 2016 Indian Telugu-language romantic drama film written and directed by Teja, featuring Dileep, Daksha Nagarkar, Chaswa, and Aberaam Varma in the lead roles.

It was released on 11 September 2015 and received negative critical reception.

== Cast ==
- Dileep Reddy as Skanda
- Daksha Nagarkar as Mythili
- Chaswa as Basawa
- Aberaam Varma as Abhiram

== Production ==
Theatre actor Chaswa made his debut through this film.

== Soundtrack ==
The music was composed by Kalyani Malik. In an audio review, a critic from The Times of India rated the film 2/5. Karthik Srinivasan of Milliblog! wrote that "Dependably likeable and interesting music from Kalyan!"

== Reception ==
A critic from The Hindu wrote that "Hora Hori would make for a reasonable watch if you haven’t watched Teja’s superhit Jayam".
