= Daksha Nagarkar =

Indian actress

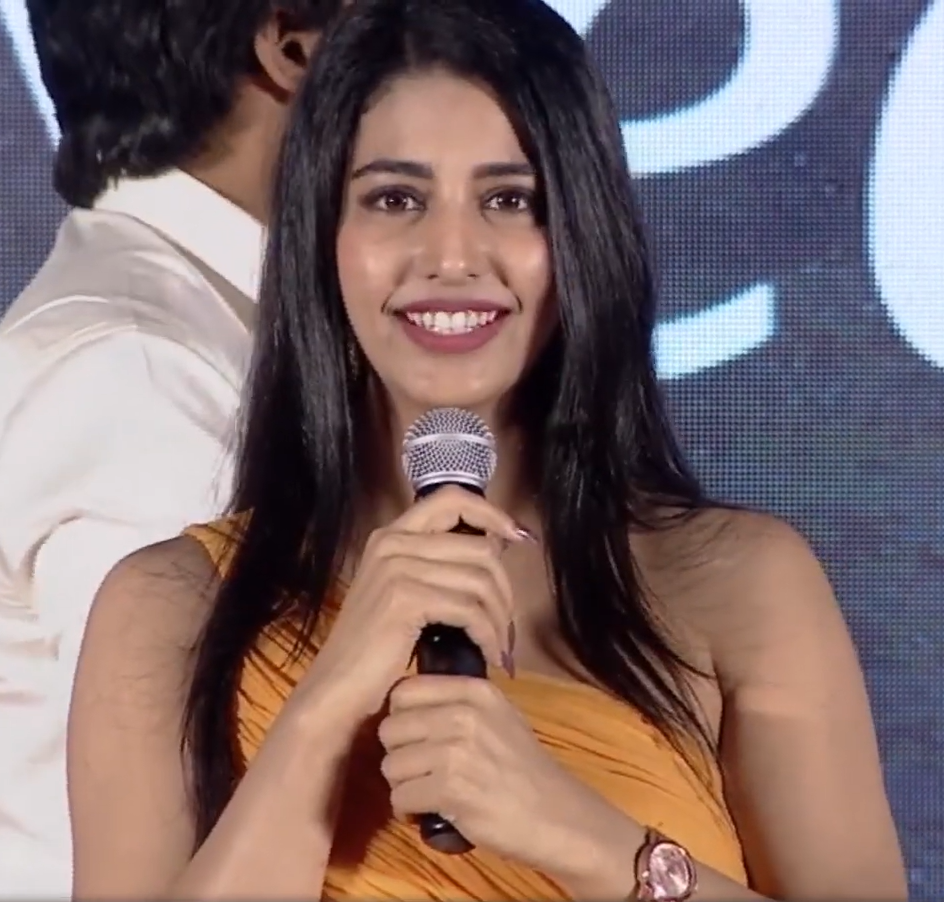
- Daksha at Zombie Reddy pre-release event in 2021
- Born: 12 July 1998 (age 28); Mumbai, Maharashtra, India
- Education: Bachelor of Business Administration
- Occupations: Actress; model
- Years active: 2014–present
- Relatives: Paras Brahmani

Daksha Nagarkar is an Indian actress and model who appears in Telugu films. She made her debut in 2014 with AK Rao PK Rao, and then worked in Hora Hori, Husharu and Zombie Reddy.

== Early life ==
She was brought up in various places including Panchgani, Hyderabad, Bangalore and Delhi as she used to stay with her mother who worked for a cosmetics company. Nagarkar initially aspired to become a cardiologist as she comes from a family of doctors. However, she instead pursued a career in modelling and acting.

== Career ==
Daksha nagarkar made her debut at the age of 19 with AK Rao PK Rao (2014). She later acted in Hora Hori in 2015 directed by Teja. Reviewing her performance in Hora Hori, Sangeetha Devi Dundoo of The Hindu wrote: "Daksha has a reasonably good screen presence and shows promise." Owing the film's shoot, Nagarkar could not attend her first year final exams and failed. Subsequently, she decided to take a break from films and complete her graduation in Bachelor of Business Administration.

Three years later, Nagarkar returned to cinema with the coming of age film Husharu (2018).

In 2021, she played a youngster addicted to gaming in Zombie Reddy. A critic from The Hindu called her performance "effective" while Firstpost's Hemanth Kumar wrote that Nagarkar got her share of glory in the action-filled moments. In 2022, Nagarkar appeared in the dance number "Entha Sakkagundiro" in Bangarraju, alongside Naga Chaitanya. Later that year, she has signed to appear in the Ravi Teja-starrer Ravanasura.

== Filmography ==
Key
†	Denotes films that have not yet been released

Year	Title	Role	Notes	Ref.
2014	AK Rao PK Rao	AK Rao's love interest		
2015	Hora Hori	Mythili		
2018	Husharu	Geeta		
2021	Zombie Reddy	Maggie		
2022	Bangarraju	Herself	Special appearance in "Entha Sakkagundiro" song	
2023	Ravanasura	Janaki / Jaanu		
2024	Love Me	Charishma	Cameo appearance	
2024	Swag	Kaluva and Vasundara Devi	Dual role	
2026	Sakhe Ga Saajani	Kavya	Marathi film	
2026	Nagabandham: The Secret Treasure	Priyamani		
2026	Korean Kanakaraju	Dancer Sunitha	Cameo appearance	
