= Premaku Raincheck =

- Release poster
- Directed by: Akella Peri Srinivas
- Produced by: Sharath Marar
- Starring: Abhilash Vadada; Priya Vadlamani; Monica Tavanam
- Cinematography: Sarath Guruvugari
- Music by: Deepak Kiran
- Release date: 7 September 2018
- Country: India
- Language: Telugu

Premaku Raincheck (transl. Raincheck for love) is a 2018 Indian Telugu-language romantic drama film directed by Akella Peri Srinivas. Featuring a cast and crew of newcomers, the film stars Abhilash Vadada, Priya Vadlamani, and Monica Tavanam.

== Plot ==
Wiki feels hesitant to say yes to the woman of his life that he met in his office, Ramya, because he is scared that it will spoil his life.

== Cast ==
- Abhilash Vadada as Wiki
- Priya Vadlamani as Ramya
- Monica Tavanam as Tanya
- Sasanka M. Velicherla as Gopi
- Pavani Reddy as Riti
- Kalki Mitra as Anu
- Suman as Mitra
- Raghu Karumanchi as Momo
- Kireeti Damaraju as Naresh

== Production ==
In ‘Premaku Raincheck’, the female lead played by Priya Vadlamani has a habit of taking rain checks (a promise which will be fulfilled in the future). So, my character happens to meet her and gives their love story a rain check".

— Vadada on the film's title, 2018

Osmania University graduate, former investment banker, and company director Akella Peri Srinivas made his debut as a director at the age of 51. Newcomers Abhilash Vadada, Priya Vadlamani, and Monica Tavanam were selected since they could speak both Telugu and English. Srinivas had the idea for the film since 1996. One song ‘Podiche Poddulo’ was shot in Dehradun.

== Music ==
The music for the film was composed by Deepak Kiran.

Track listing
No.	Title	Lyrics	Singer(s)	Length
1.	"Adventure Song"	Raghu Ram Mahamkali	Sasanka M. Velicherla, Sravana Bhargavi	5:03
2.	"Pranama Pranama"	Shreshta	Satya Yamini	6:03
3.	"Every Saint Has A Past"	Collage Of Quotes	Cherry	3:38
4.	"Zumba"	Raghu Ram Mahamkali	Timothy, Bhargavi Pillai	4:15
5.	"Varamena"	Raghu Ram Mahamkali	Satya Yamini, Sri Sowmya, Mounima	3:35
Total length:				22:34

== Reception ==
A critic from The Times of India gave the film a rating of three out of five stars and said that "Director Akella Peri Srinivas ensures the audience stick to their seats by creating a regular metro (city) ambiance, projecting lifestyle of regular working class. The movie slows down a bit on many occasions times. The traditional music and direction with the available resources and budget available, is an add on to the movie. When the movie is about to lose its pace, Ramya’s witty one-liners turn out to be the saving grace". Srividya Palaparthi of Cinema Express gave the film the same rating and opined that "If you’re willing to look past the inexperience of the film’s cast, you may find that the heart of this film is in the right place". A critic from 123Telugu gave the film a negative review and noted that "On the whole, Premaku Raincheck is a triangular love story which lacks the basic freshness".
