= Sudheer Varma =

Indian film director, writer

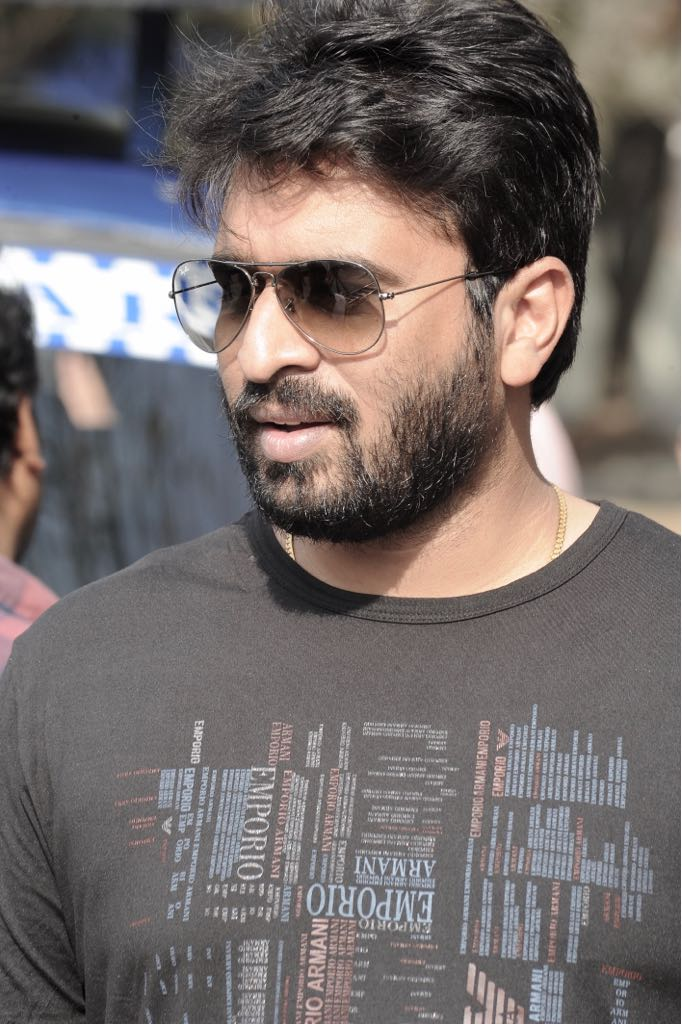
- Varma in 2018
- Born: 6 October 1979 (age 47); Bhimavaram, Andhra Pradesh, Indian
- Occupations: Film director; writer
- Years active: 2011–present
- Notable work: Swamy Ra Ra; Keshava
- Spouse: Radha Kumari
- Children: 2

Sudheer Varma is an Indian film director and writer who predominantly works in Telugu cinema. He made his directorial debut with the film Swamy Ra Ra (2013). He later directed films such as Dohchay (2015), Keshava (2017), and Ranarangam (2019).

== Early life ==
Sudheer Varma Kucharlapati was born on 6 October 1979 in Bhimavaram. Varma was schooled in Visakhapatnam and completed his intermediate in Kakinada. He grew up in Narasapuram. He was an Electronics and Communication Engineer by profession. He started his career as an assistant director.

== Personal life ==
Varma is married to Radha Kumari and the couple has two children.

== Career ==
Sudheer Varma released his debut directorial venture Swamy Ra Ra (2013), starring Nikhil Siddharth and Swathi Reddy. The Hindu stated that "the film will pick-pocket your brain and you'll most probably end up feeling richer, if not a millionaire." It was commercially successful at the box office. The film was remade in Kannada as Jamboo Savari.

Varma's second film was Dohchay (2015), starring Naga Chaitanya and Kriti Sanon. He later directed Keshava (2017) with Nikhil Siddharth, Ritu Varma, and Isha Kopikar in the lead roles.

== Style and influences ==
Talking about his style he shared, "I'm influenced largely by foreign films. I am a huge fan of Quentin Tarantino, Christopher Nolan, Steven Spielberg, and Martin Scorsese. Their work has been very important to me, in regards to my learning. As for my style, whenever I do a film, I watch a lot of films from the same genre. If I see anything interesting, I adapt it. The story structure is mine and in place even before I've thought of possible inspirations. After that, I might adapt some scenes in my films, from others. Still, I do the screenplay to suit our audience. I don't want the audience to get disconnected from my film, so I make sure our audience relate to it"

In another interview he said, "According to me, inspiration or copying, both are the same. That's why I give credit to the directors from whom I steal the scenes. Keshava too, is inspired from several films, but not any one particular film. So, in the special thanks card, I mentioned each director from whose films I took inspiration for Keshava. This is my way of paying tribute to the scenes that have left a great impact on me. My favourite Indian directors are Mani Ratnam, Ram Gopal Varma, Rajkumar Santoshi, and Rajkumar Hirani."

== Filmography ==
Key
†	Denotes films that have not yet been released

Film
Year	Title	Director	Writer	Producer	Notes	Ref.
2013	Swamy Ra Ra	Yes	Yes	No		
2015	Dohchay	Yes	Yes	No		
2017	Keshava	Yes	Yes	No		
2018	Kirrak Party	No	Yes	No		
2019	Ranarangam	Yes	Yes	No		
2021	Super Over	No	No	Yes		
2022	Saakini Daakini	Yes	No	No		
2023	Ravanasura	Yes	No	No		
2024	Appudo Ippudo Eppudo	Yes	Yes	No		
