= Husharu =

2018 Indian comedy film directed by Sree Harsha

Hushaaru
- Film poster
- Directed by: Sree Harsha Konuganti
- Written by: Sree Harsha Konuganti
- Produced by: Bekkem Venugopal; Riaz A.
- Starring: Tejus Kancherla; Tej Kurapati; Dinesh Tej; Abhinav Medishetti; Rahul Ramakrishna; Daksha Nagarkar; Priya Vadlamani; Hemal Ingle; Ramya Pasupuleti
- Cinematography: Raj Thota
- Edited by: Vijay Vardhan Kavuri
- Music by: Radhan; Sunny M.R.; Varikuppala Yadagiri
- Production companies: Lucky Media; Asin Movie Creations
- Release date: 14 December 2018
- Running time: 147 minutes
- Country: India
- Language: Telugu
- Box office: ₹13 crore

Hushaaru (transl. Zest) is a 2018 Indian Telugu-language coming of age buddy comedy film written and directed by Sree Harsha Konuganti. It stars Tejus Kancherla, Tej Kurapati, Dinesh Tej, Abhinav Medishetti, Rahul Ramakrishna, Daksha Nagarkar, Priya Vadlamani, Hemal Ingle and Ramya Pasupuleti.

== Plot ==
Four engineering graduates from middle-class families Arya, Chay, Dhruv and Bunty are clueless about their lives but enjoy being in each other's company, making the most of their energy. Just when things are going smooth, a personal setback hits them hard. How they rise above it and help their friendship stand the test of character and time is the story of Husharu.

== Cast ==
- Tejus Kancherla as Arya
- Tej Kurapati as Bunty
- Dinesh Tej as Dhruv
- Abhinav Medishetti as Chaitanya "Chay"
- Rahul Ramakrishna as Raj Bollam
- Daksha Nagarkar as Geeta, Arya's love interest
- Priya Vadlamani as Riya, Chay's ex-girlfriend
- Hemal Ingle as Sowmya, Dhruv's love interest
- Ramya Pasupuleti as Priya, Chay's love interest
- Appaji Ambarisha Darbha as Arya's father
- Pramodini as Chay's mother
- Fish Venkat as Laddanna
- Krishna Kranthi as Amaram

== Soundtrack ==
The songs were composed by Radhan, Sunny M.R., and Varikuppala Yadagiri.

No.	Title	Lyrics	Music	Singer(s)	Length
1.	"Na Na Na"	Bhaskarabhatla	Radhan	Bobo Shashi	3:53
2.	"Undiporaadhey – Male Version"	Kittu Vissapragada	Radhan	Sid Sriram	2:53
3.	"Friendship"	Krishna Kanth	Sunny M. R.	Tushar Joshi	3:30
4.	"Pichaak"	Varikuppala Yadagiri	Varikuppala Yadagiri	Varikuppala Yaadagiri	4:08
5.	"Naatu Naatu"	Krishna Kanth	Radhan	Rahul Sipligunj, Priya Himesh	1:43
6.	"Nuvve Nuvve"	Krishna Kanth	Sunny M. R.	Arjit Singh	3:10
7.	"O Pilla Kabooma"	Kalanidhi Masterji	Varikuppala Yadagiri	Rahul Ramakrishna	1:28
8.	"Undiporaadhey – Sad Version"	Kittu Vissapragada	Radhan	Sid Sriram	2:33
9.	"Kaboom"	Roll Rida	Sunny M. R.	Roll Rida	1:30
10.	"Undiporaadhey – Female Version"	Spoorthi Yadagiri	Radhan	Spoorthi Yadagiri	2:25
11.	"Bad Boys"	Krishna Kanth	Sunny M. R.	Roll Rida (rap portions), Sunny M.R.	3:00
Total length:					30:13

== Release ==
The film was scheduled to release in August 2018 before being postponed to December of that same year. Raj Surya is directing the Kannada remake of the film starring Chandan Achar, Anup Revanna and Shrimahadev.

== Reception ==
=== Critical reception ===
The Times of India gave the film a rating of three out of five stars and wrote that "Hushaaru is mostly refreshing, captures the humorous side to friendships with zest". Asianet News Telugu gave the film 2.5 of 5 and appreciated the film's screenplay.

=== Box office ===
The film grossed ₹5 crore in five days, and ran for 50 days in theatres.
