= Super Over (film) =

2021 film directed by Praveen Varma

- Release poster
- Directed by: Praveen Varma
- Written by: Praveen Varma
- Produced by: Sudheer Varma
- Starring: Naveen Chandra; Chandini Chowdary; Ajay; Praveen; Rakendu Mouli
- Cinematography: Divakar Mani
- Edited by: M. S. Rajashekhar Reddy (S. R. Shekhar)
- Music by: Sunny M. R.
- Production company: SAS Pictures
- Distributed by: Aha
- Release date: 22 January 2021
- Running time: 83 minutes
- Country: India
- Language: Telugu

Super Over is a 2021 Indian Telugu-language crime thriller film written and directed by Praveen Varma. It is produced by Sudheer Varma through SAS Pictures production company. The film stars Naveen Chandra, Chandini Chowdary, Ajay, Praveen, and Rakendu Mouli. Music of the film was composed by Sunny M.R. Super Over premiered on 22 January 2021 on Aha.

== Plot ==
Kaasi (Naveen Chandra), Madhu (Chandini Chowdary) and Vasu (Rakendu Mouli) are childhood friends. Kaasi plans to go abroad but is cheated by travel consultant. The debt for his abroad plans, for which he put his house as collateral, have to be repaid. To earn money, Kaasi starts bets on cricket matches and he wins ₹1.7 crores. The following drama revolves around whether he collects his winnings and the consequences faced with his two friends.

== Cast ==
- Naveen Chandra as Kaasi
- Chandini Chowdary as Madhu
- Rakendu Mouli as Vasu
- Ajay as Inspector Ajay
- Praveen as Murali
- Harsha Chemudu as Bangaru Raju

== Production ==
Principal photography of the film began in late 2019 but was delayed due to COVID-19 pandemic. Director Praveen Varma died in a road accident in October 2020, after which producer Sudheer Varma managed the post-production.

== Reception ==
Sangeetha Devi writing for The Hindu stated: "Super Over doesn’t tap its potential of being an edge-of-the-seat thriller but is a reasonably packaged thriller." Sakshi critic Rentala Jayadeva appreciated the screenplay and direction for its novelty, in addition to the performances. Bhavenesh Chander of The New Indian Express felt that the narration tended to slow down as the film progressed. Reviewing the climax, Chander wrote, "Super overs are meant to yield a final result. However, Super Over ends with a cliff-hanger. The penultimate ball is also not fulfilling."

Film Companion's Vishal Menon opined, "Look past a long initial stretch of amateur writing and you get a nighttime thriller that’s surprisingly engaging."
