= Sunny M.R. =

Indian music composer, music producer, sound engineer and playback singer

- Born: Sunny Sanour; Patna, Bihar, India
- Other name: Sunny
- Occupations: Music producer; composer; playback singer; sound engineer
- Years active: 2001–present

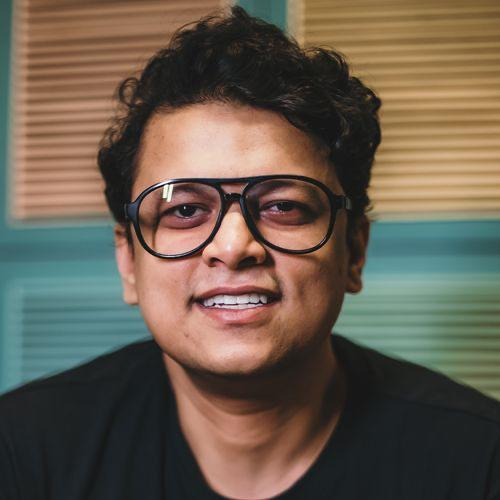
Sunny M.R.

Sunny Sanour, known professionally as Sunny M.R., is an Indian music composer, music producer, sound engineer, and playback singer. He is best known for his music in the Telugu films Swamy Ra Ra (2013) and Uyyala Jampala (2013). He won Global Indian Music Award, Mirchi Music Award for the Hindi film, Yeh Jawaani Hai Deewani (2013), as the "Best Music Arranger cum Programmer" and "Song Programmer cum Arranger of the Year" in 2014.

== Early life ==
Sanour studied at St. Anne's High School in Patna, Bihar, and then joined as sound engineer to assist his accomplished brother, Shadab Rayeen. After 6 months, Sunny became an independent sound engineer at the age of 15. He mastered mixing, arranging, and composing various tunes primarily for Keerthana Digital Studios, in Hyderabad, Telangana, for 6 years.

== Career ==
In Keerthana Digital studios, Sunny collaborated 350 albums mastering ragas from carnatic Music. In the initial stage, he used to hate composing with carnatic tunes, but realised afterwards, that jazz is a harmonised version of carnatic music. Then he started loving composing albums with carnatic ragas. Sunny moved to Mumbai to meet Sandeep Chowta and joined as a sound engineer. Late Anil Kumar (a music director) and Krishna Chaitanya (a lyricist) inspired Sunny to join as a music director. Sudheer Varma, the director of the Telugu film Swamy Ra Ra selected him to compose its soundtrack.

Sunny was part of an open music community called Blogswara. The Blogswara team expressed appreciation for his involvement as a music director when it shut down in 2013.

== Discography ==
=== As composer ===
Year	Title	Language	Notes
2013	Swamy Ra Ra	Telugu	
2013	Uyyala Jampala	Telugu	
2014	Rowdy Fellow	Telugu	
2015	Thanu Nenu	Telugu	
2015	Dohchay	Telugu	
2015	Bhale Manchi Roju	Telugu	
2017	Keshava	Telugu	
2018	Husharu	Telugu	
2021	Super Over	Telugu	
2021	3 Roses	Telugu	
2024	Om Bheem Bush	Telugu	
2024	Kahan Shuru Kahan Khatam	Hindi	
2024	Appudo Ippudo Eppudo	Telugu	
2024	Roti Kapda Romance	Telugu	Only background score

=== As arranger and record producer ===
Year	Title	Language	Music Programmer	Music Sound Designer	Score Mixing Engineer	Song Mixing Engineer	Backing Vocals	Recording Supervisor
2015	Dohchay	Telugu	Yes	Yes	Yes	Yes	Yes	Yes
2015	Baahubali: The Beginning	Telugu / Tamil	Yes	Yes				
2014	Rowdy Fellow	Telugu	Yes	Yes	Yes	Yes	Yes	Yes
2013	Uyyala Jampala	Telugu	Yes	Yes	Yes	Yes	Yes	Yes
2013	Swamy Ra Ra	Telugu	Yes	Yes	Yes	Yes	Yes	Yes
2013	Race 2	Hindi		Yes			Yes	Yes
2012	Barfi!	Hindi	Yes	Yes	Yes	Yes	Yes	Yes
2012	Cocktail	Hindi	Yes		Yes	Yes	Yes	Yes
2012	Jannat 2	Hindi	Yes	Yes		Yes		Yes
2012	Agent Vinod	Hindi	Yes	Yes		Yes	Yes	Yes
2012	Players	Hindi	Yes			Yes	Yes	Yes
2011	Desi Boyz	Hindi	Yes			Yes	Yes	Yes
2011	Mausam	Hindi	Yes		Yes	Yes		Yes
2011	Bodyguard	Hindi	Yes			Yes	Yes	Yes
2011	Ready	Hindi	Yes			Yes	Yes	Yes
2011	Dum Maaro Dum	Hindi	Yes			Yes	Yes	Yes
2011	Thank You	Hindi	Yes			Yes	Yes	Yes
2010	Housefull	Hindi			Yes	Yes		
2010	Kedi	Telugu	Yes	Yes	Yes	Yes	Yes	Yes
2008	Thoda Pyaar Thoda Magic	Hindi			Yes	Yes		Yes
2007	Om Shanti Om	Hindi			Yes	Yes		

=== As playback singer ===
- "Swamy Ra Ra (Reload)" in Swamy Ra Ra
- "Mana Bandham" in Uyyala Jampala
- "Aanati Devadasu" in Dohchay
- "Dil Udd Jaare" in Pagglait

== Awards ==
Year	Award	Song	Film	Category	Result	Ref.
2013	Mirchi Music Awards	"Badtameez Dil"	Yeh Jawaani Hai Deewani	Programmer & Arranger of the Year	Won	
2015	Mirchi Music Awards	"Selfie Le Le Re"	Bajrangi Bhaijaan	Best Song Producer (Programming & Arranging)	Nominated	
2016	Mirchi Music Awards	"Dhaakad"	Dangal	Best Song Producer (Programming & Arranging)	Nominated	
2016	Mirchi Music Awards	"Dhaakad"	Dangal	Best Song Engineer (Recording & Mixing)	Nominated	
2016	Mirchi Music Awards	"Bulleya"	Ae Dil Hai Mushkil	Best Song Engineer (Recording & Mixing)	Nominated	
2017	Mirchi Music Awards	"Ghar"	Jab Harry Met Sejal	Best Song Producer (Programming & Arranging)	Nominated	
2017	Mirchi Music Awards	"Ullu Ka Pattha"	Jagga Jasoos	Best Song Producer (Programming & Arranging)	Nominated	
2017	Mirchi Music Awards	"Radio(Film Version)"	Tubelight	Best Song Producer (Programming & Arranging)	Nominated	
