= G2 (film) =

Upcoming Indian film by Adivi Sesh

- Directed by: Vinay Kumar Sirigineedi
- Written by: Adivi Sesh; Vinay Kumar Sirigineedi
- Produced by: T. G. Vishwa Prasad; Abhishek Agarwal
- Starring: Adivi Sesh; Emraan Hashmi; Wamiqa Gabbi; Madhu Shalini
- Cinematography: Azeem Mohammad
- Edited by: Kodati Pavan Kalyan
- Music by: Sricharan Pakala
- Production companies: People Media Factory; Abhishek Agarwal Arts; AK Entertainments
- Country: India
- Language: Telugu
- Budget: ₹80 crore

G2 is an upcoming Indian Telugu-language spy action thriller film directed by Vinay Kumar Sirigineedi in his directorial debut. It is a sequel to Goodachari (2018), with Adivi Sesh reprising his role. The film also stars Emraan Hashmi, Wamiqa Gabbi and Madhu Shalini.

== Synopsis ==
G2 continues the story of an Indian spy on an overseas mission to fight for his country.

== Cast ==
- Adivi Sesh
- Emraan Hashmi
- Wamiqa Gabbi
- Madhu Shalini
- Supriya Yarlagadda as Nadiya Qureshi
- Jisshu Sengupta

== Release ==
G2 was scheduled to be released in theatres on 1 May 2026. During the shoot of some action sequences of Dacoit: A Love Story, Sesh had a PCL tear and was unable to complete the shoot for G2 within the expected time. Hence, the release is being postponed to 5 February 2027.
