= List of Telugu films of 2020 =

This is a list of Telugu-language films produced in the Telugu cinema in India that were released in the year 2020.

== Box office collection ==
The List of highest-grossing Telugu films released in 2020, by worldwide box office gross revenue, are as follows:
Rank	Title	Production company	Worldwide gross	Ref
1	Ala Vaikunthapurramuloo	Haarika & Hassini Creations; Geetha Arts	₹240 crore (equivalent to ₹282 crore or US$29 million in 2023)	
2	Sarileru Neekevaru	AK Entertainments; Sri Venkateswara Creations; G. Mahesh Babu Entertainment Pvt. Ltd	₹180 crore (equivalent to ₹212 crore or US$22 million in 2023)	
3	Bheeshma	Sithara Entertainments	₹52 crore (equivalent to ₹61 crore or US$6.4 million in 2023)	
4	Disco Raja	SRT Entertainment	₹30 crore (equivalent to ₹35 crore or US$3.7 million in 2023)	
5	Solo Brathuke So Better	Sri Venkateswara Cine Chitra	₹21.25 crore (equivalent to ₹25 crore or US$2.6 million in 2023)	
6	World Famous Lover	Creative Commercials	₹17 crore (equivalent to ₹20 crore or US$2.1 million in 2023)	
7	Jaanu	Sri Venkateshwara Creations	₹15.06 crore (equivalent to ₹18 crore or US$1.8 million in 2023)	
8	Aswathama	Ira Creations	₹13.65 crore (equivalent to ₹16 crore or US$1.7 million in 2023)	
9	HIT: The First Case	Wall Poster Cinema	₹12.6 crore (equivalent to ₹15 crore or US$1.5 million in 2023)	
10	Entha Manchivadavuraa	Aditya Music	₹11.3 crore (equivalent to ₹13 crore or US$1.4 million in 2023)	

== January – March ==
Opening		Title	Director	Cast	Production House	Ref.
J A N	1	Beautiful	Agasthya Manju	Parth Suri; Naina Ganguly	Tiger / Company Production	
J A N	1	Oollalla Oollalla	Satya Prakash	Nataraj; Noorin Shereef; Ankeeta R Maharanaa	M/s. Sukhibhava Movies And Cinemas	
J A N	3	Utthara	SR Thirupathi	Sreeram; Karronya Katrynn; Ajay Ghosh	Live In C Creations; Gangothri Art Creations	
J A N	3	Wife,i	GSSP Kalyan	Abhishek Reddy; Sakshi Sidiya; Kavya	Lakshmi Charitha Arts	
J A N	11	Sarileru Neekevvaru	Anil Ravipudi	Mahesh Babu; Rashmika Mandanna; Vijayashanti; Prakash Raj; Rajendra Prasad; Rao Ramesh; Posani Krishna Murali; Brahmaji; Tanikella Bharani; Vennela Kishore; Satyadev; Ajay; Subbaraju; Murali Sharma; Jaya Prakash Reddy; Raghu Babu; Rajiv Kanakala; Bandla Ganesh; Sangeeta; Hari Teja; Satya	AK Entertainments; Sri Venkateswara Creations; G. Mahesh Babu Entertainment Pvt. Ltd	
J A N	12	Ala Vaikunthapurramuloo	Trivikram Srinivas	Allu Arjun; Pooja Hegde; Tabu; Jayaram; Sushanth; Navdeep; Nivetha Pethuraj; Samuthirakani; Murali Sharma; Rajendra Prasad; Sunil; Sachin Khedekar; Harsha Vardhan; Govind Padmasoorya; Rohini; Rahul Ramakrishna; Brahmaji; Vennela Kishore; Ajay; Tanikella Bharani	Geetha Arts; Haarika & Hassine Creations	
J A N	15	Entha Manchivaadavuraa	Satish Vegesna	Kalyan Ram; Mehreen Pirzada; Naresh; Sarath Babu; Suhasini Maniratnam; Vijayakumar; Baladitya; Vennela Kishore; Rajeev Kanakala; Pavitra Lokesh; Praveen; Prabhas Sreenu; Subhalekha Sudhakar; Tanikella Bharani; Sivannarayana Naripeddi; Ravi Varma	Aditya Music	
J A N	22	Thagite Thandana	Srinath Badineni	Adith Arun; Sapthagiri; Madhunandan; Simran Gupta	Right Turn Films	
J A N	24	Disco Raja	Vi Anand	Ravi Teja; Payal Rajput; Nabha Natesh; Tanya Hope; Bobby Simha; Sunil; Vennela Kishore; Satya; Ramki; Naresh; Bharath Reddy; Raghu Babu; Annapurna; Giri Babu; Shishir Sharma	SRT Entertainments	
J A N	30	DubSmash	Keshav Depur	Pavan Krishna; Supraja; Getup Srinu	V3 Films	
J A N	31	Aswathama	Ramana Teja	Naga Shaurya; Mehreen Pirzada; Jisshu Sengupta; Harish Uthaman; Sargun Kaur Luthra; Prince Cecil; Aadarsh Balakrishna; Posani Krishna Murali	Ira Creations	
J A N	31	Choosi Choodangaane	Sesha Sindhu Rao	Shiva Kandukuri; Varsha Bollamma; Malavika Satheesan; Pavitra Lokesh; Anish Kuruvilla; Gururaj Manepalli; Venkatesh Kakumanu; Rajesh Khanna	Dharmapatha Creations	
F E B	7	Jaanu	C. Premkumar	Sharwanand; Samantha Akkineni; Sai Kiran Kumar; Gouri G. Kishan; Tanikella Bharani; Vennela Kishore; Raghu Babu; Varsha Bollamma; Saranya Pradeep	Sri Venkateswara Creations	
F E B	7	3 Monkeys	Anil Kumar G	Sudigali Sudheer; Getup Srinu; Ram Prasad; Karunya Chowdary; Kautilya	Orugallu Cine Creations	
F E B	7	Savaari	Saahith Mothkuri	Nandu; Priyanka Sharma; Srikanth Reddy Ganta; Shiva Kumar; Maddy	Kaalva Narasimha Swamy Productions	
F E B	7	Degree College	Narasimha Nandi	Varun; Sri Divya; Duvvasi Mohan; Jayavani; Srinivas Madan; RK	Sri Lakshmi Narasimha Cinema	
F E B	7	Neevalle Nenunna	Saibaba. M	Surya Sreenivas; Sri Pallavi; Sudharshan; Ram Prasad; Anish Kuruvilla	Encounter pictures	
F E B	14	World Famous Lover	Kranthi Madhav	Vijay Deverakonda; Raashi Khanna; Catherine Tresa; Aishwarya Rajesh; Izabelle Leite	Creative Commercials	
F E B	14	Oka Chinna Viramam	Sundeep cheguri	Punarnavi Bhupalam; Sanjay Varma; Naveen Neni; Garima Singh	Moonwalk Entertainments	
F E B	14	Shiva 143	Sagar Sailesh	Sagar Sailesh; Yeisha Adaraha; Hrithika singh; D.S.Rao	Bhimavaram Talkies	
F E B	14	Life Anubavinchu Raja	Suresh Thirumur	Raviteja; Sravani Nikki; Shruti Shetty	Raja Reddy Moviee makers	
F E B	21	Bheeshma	Venky Kudumula	Nithin; Rashmika Mandanna; Anant Nag; Jisshu Sengupta; Vennela Kishore; Sampath Raj; Ajay; Naresh; Praveena; Brahmaji; Mime Gopi; Subhalekha Sudhakar; Raghu Babu; Satya	Sithara Entertainments	
F E B	21	Pressure Cooker	Sujoi & Sushil	Sai Ronak; Preethi Asrani; Rahul Ramakrishna; Rajai Rowan; Tanikella Bharani; Ravi Varma; C.V.L. Narasimha Rao	Karampuri Kreations; Mic Movies; Abhishek Pictures	
F E B	21	Valayam	Ramesh Kadumula	Laksh Chadalavada; Digangana Suryavanshi	STTV Films	
F E B	21	Cheema Prema Madhyalo Bhaama	Srikanth 'Sri' Appalaraju	Amith; Indhu Cherukuri	Magnum-opus Films	
F E B	28	Raahu	Subbu Vedula	Kriti Garg; AbeRaam Varma; Chalaki Chanti; kalikeya Prabhakar	Sri Shakthy Swaroop Movie Creations	
F E B	28	HIT: The First Case	Sailesh Kolanu	Vishwak Sen; Ruhani Sharma; Brahmaji; Hari Teja; Murli Sharma; Bhanu Chander; Ravi Varma	Wallposter Cinema	
F E B	28	Swecha	KPN Chawhan	Mangli; Chammak Chandra	Lachhuram Productions	
M A R	6	College Kumar	Hari Santhosh	Rajendra Prasad; Rahul Vijay; Priya Vadlamani; Madhubala; Nassar; Manobala	MR Pictures	
M A R	6	Palasa 1978	Karuna Kumar	Rakshit; Nakshatra; Raghu Kunche; Thiruveer; Laxman Meesala	Sudhas Media	
M A R	6	O Pitta Katha	Chandu Muddu	Viswant Duddumpudi; Sanjay Rao; Nithya Shetty; Brahmaji	Bhavya Creations	
M A R	6	Anukunnadi Okkati Ayyandhi Okati	Baalu Adusumilli	Dhanya Balakrishna; Komalee Prasad; Siddhi Idnani; Tridha Choudhury; Raghu Babu; Himaja; Raghu Karumanchi; Sameer Hasan	Black and White Pictures; Poorvi Pictures	
M A R	6	Screenplay of an Indian Love Story	K L Prasad	Pragathi Yadhati; Vikram Shiva	Bujji Budugu Films	
M A R	13	Eureka	Karteek Anand	Karteek Anand; Syed Sohel; Dimple Hayathi; Shalini Vadnikatti	Lakshmi Prasad Productions	
M A R	13	Madha	Srividya Basawa	Trishna Mukherjee; Venkat Rahul; Anish Kuruvilla; Bikramjeet Kanwarpal	Third Eye Productions	
M A R	13	Arjuna	Kanmani	Rajasekhar; Maryam Zakaria	Kwity Entertainment; Nattis Entertainment	

== April – June ==
Films were not released theatrically from 17 March 2020 due to the COVID-19 pandemic.

Opening		Title	Director	Cast	Production House	Ref.
A P R	29	Amrutharamam	Surender Kontadi	Amitha Ranganath; Ram Mittakanti	Padmaja Films; Suresh Productions; ZEE5	
M A Y	29	Run	Lakshmikanth Chenna	Navdeep; Pujita Ponnada	First Frame Entertainments; Aha	
J U N	25	Krishna and His Leela	Ravikanth Perepu	Siddu Jonnalagadda; Shraddha Srinath; Seerat Kapoor; Shalini Vadnikatti	Suresh Productions; Viacom18 Motion Pictures	
J U N	30	47 Days	Pradeep Maddali	Satyadev; Pooja Jhaveri	Title Card Entertainment; ZEE5	

== July – December ==
Opening		Title	Director	Cast	Production House	Ref.
J U L	3	Bhanumathi & Ramakrishna	Srikanth Nagothi	Naveen Chandra; Salony Luthra	North Star Entertainment; Aha	
J U L	30	Uma Maheswara Ugra Roopasya	Venkatesh Maha	Satyadev; Naresh; Suhas; Raghavan; Hari Chandana; Roopa Koduvayur; Ravindra Vijay; Jabardasth Ramprasad; TNR	Arka Media Works; Mahayana Motion Pictures	
J U L	31	Meka Suri	Trinadh Velisala	Abhinay Reddy; Syed Sumaya Farahath	Simba Entertainment	
A U G	14	Johaar	Teja Marni	Esther Anil; Ankith Koyya; Naina Ganguly; Easwari Rao; Subhalekha Sudhakar	Dharma Surya Pictures; Aha	
A U G	21	Buchinaidu Khandriga	Poluru Krishna	Drishika Chander; Ravi Varma	Aha	
S E P	5	V	Mohan Krishna Indraganti	Nani; Sudheer Babu; Nivetha Thomas; Aditi Rao Hydari; Vennela Kishore	Sri Venkateswara Creations	
S E P	5	Maguva	Sriram Yedhoti	Madhupriya; Prasanna Pushpamala; Suresh babu; Harishchandhra; Naviketh Patil; Devalaraju Ravi	Universal Dreams	
S E P	18	Amaram Akhilam Prema	Edwards Jonathan	Vijay Ram; Shivshakti Sachdev	Aha	
O C T	2	Nishabdham	Hemant Madhukar	Anushka Shetty; Madhavan; Michael Madsen; Anjali; Subbaraju; Shalini Pandey; Srinivas Avasarala	People Media Factory Kona Film Corporation	
O C T	2	Orey Bujjiga	Vijay Kumar Konda	Raj Tarun; Malavika Nair; Hebah Patel	Sri Sathya Arts	
O C T	23	Colour Photo	Sandeep Raj	Suhas; Chandini Chowdary; Sunil	Amrutha Productions; Loukya Entertainment	
N O V	4	Miss India	Narendra Nath	Keerthy Suresh; Jagapathi Babu; Rajendra Prasad; Naveen Chandra	East Coast Productions	
N O V	6	Gatham	Kiran Reddy	Bhargava Poludasu; Rakesh Galebhe; Poojitha Kuraparthi	S Originals	
N O V	10	Dhira	Arun Kumar Rapolu	Bellamkonda Sreenivas	A Theorem Studios	
N O V	14	Maa Vintha Gaadha Vinuma	Aditya Mandala	Siddu Jonnalagadda; Seerat Kapoor; Tanikella Bharani	Silly Monks Studio; Aryath Cine Creations; Melodrama Studios	
N O V	20	Anaganaga O Athdhi	Dayal Padmanabhan	Chaitanya Krishna; Payal Rajput	Trend Loud	
N O V	20	Middle Class Melodies	Vinod Ananthoju	Anand Devarakonda; Varsha Bollamma	Bhavya Creations	
N O V	27	Meka Suri 2	Trinadh Velisala	Abhinay Reddy; Syed Sumaya Farahath	Simba Entertainment	
D E C	3	Bombhaat	Raghavendra Varma	Chandini Chowdary; Sai Sushanth Reddy; Simran Choudhary	Suchetha DreamWorks Productions	
D E C	10	IIT Krishnamurthy	Sree Vardhan	Dandamudi Pruthvi; Maira Doshi; Anand; Satya	Crystolyte Media Creations; Akki Arts	
D E C	17	Guvva Gorinka	Bammidi Mohan	Satyadev; Priyaa Lal; Chaitanya Madhumita	Mango Mass Media; Akar Works	
D E C	18	Dirty Hari	M. S. Raju	Shravan Reddy; Ruhani Sharma; Ajay	SPJ Creations	
D E C	24	Murder	Anand Chandra	Avancha Sahiti; Krishnaswamy Srikanth	Nattis Entertainments; Kwity Entertainments	
D E C	25	Solo Brathuke So Better	Subbu	Sai Dharam Tej; Nabha Natesh; Rajendra Prasad	Sri Venkateswara Cine Chitra	
D E C	25	Oka Yodhudu	Haari	Daryakish	Sampreeth Cinema productions	

== Events ==
=== Award ceremonies ===
Date	Event	Host	Location	Ref.
11 January	3rd Zee Cine Awards Telugu	Zee Entertainment Enterprises	G. M. C. Balayogi SATS Indoor Stadium, Gachibowli, Hyderabad, Telangana, India	
14 March	Critics Choice Film Awards	Film Critics Guild and Motion Content Group	Mumbai, Maharashtra, India	

== See also ==
- List of Telugu films of 2019
- Lists of Telugu-language films
- List of Telugu films of 2021
