= Siddhu Jonnalagadda =

Indian actor

- Jonnalagadda in 2022
- Born: Siddharth Jonnalagadda; 7 February 1988 (age 38); Hyderabad, Telangana, India
- Occupations: Actor, screenwriter
- Years active: 2008–present

Siddharth Jonnalagadda is an Indian actor and screenwriter known for his works predominantly in Telugu cinema. He made his debut with Josh (2009) and in Tamil with Vallinam (2014). Jonnalagadda later went on to co-write and appear in films such as Guntur Talkies (2016) and Krishna and His Leela (2020), whereas DJ Tillu (2022) and Tillu Square (2024) established him in Telugu cinema.

== Early life ==
Siddhu Jonnalagadda was born on 7 February 1988 in Hyderabad, Telangana, India into a family hailing from Guntur, Andhra Pradesh. He completed his intermediate from Sri Chaitanya College (Tarnaka) in 2005 and B.Tech from the Holy Mary Institute of Engineering in 2009, before venturing into films. His elder brother Chaitu Jonnalagadda is also an actor.

== Career ==
Jonnalagadda appeared in minor roles in Josh and Orange. He made his lead debut with Praveen Sattaru's Life Before Wedding. He then worked on the unreleased film Jagame Maya co-starring Siva Balaji, the Tamil film Vallinam (2014), Boy Meets Girl (2014) and Ice Cream 2 (2014).

He gained recognition for Sattaru's Guntur Talkies (2016). After a four year gap, he played the lead role in Krishna and His Leela (2020), a romantic drama film co-starring Shraddha Srinath, Shalini Vadnikatti and Seerat Kapoor. In a review of the film by The Times of India, the reviewer wrote that "Siddhu is an absolute delight and a revelation in this one. ... The key to his character lies in being effortless, and he plays it well". Jonnalagadda earned the name Star Boy Siddhu after the success of DJ Tillu (2022), and starred in its sequel Tillu Square (2024).

== Filmography ==
=== Films ===
Key
†	Denotes films that have not yet been released

- All films are in Telugu, unless otherwise noted.

Year	Title	Role	Notes	Ref.
2009	Josh	College student	credited as Siddharth	
2010	Orange	Santhosh	credited as Siddharth	
2010	Bheemili Kabaddi Jattu	Dhinesh	credited as Siddhartha	
2010	Don Seenu	Sreeja's boyfriend		
2011	Life Before Wedding	Rishi		
2012	Siva Manasulo Sruthi	Arun		
2013	Jagamemaaya			
2014	Vallinam	Vamsi	Tamil film	
2014	Boy Meets Girl	Siddhu		
2014	Ice Cream 2	Filmmaker		
2016	Guntur Talkies	Hari		
2019	Kalki	Sekhar Babu		
2020	Krishna and His Leela	Krishna		
2020	Maa Vintha Gaadha Vinuma	Siddhu	Also creative producer	
2022	DJ Tillu	Bala Gangadhar Tilak "DJ Tillu"	Nominated–SIIMA Award for Best Actor – Telugu	
2024	Tillu Square	Bala Gangadhar Tilak "DJ Tillu"		
2024	Mr. Bachchan	Youth Yuvraj	Cameo appearance	
2025	Jack	Pablo Neruda "Jack"		
2025	Telusu Kada	Varun		
TBA	Tillu Cube †	Bala Gangadhar Tilak alias D.J. Tillu		

=== Other crew positions ===
Year	Title	Credited as			Notes	Ref.
Year	Title	Writer	Editor	Lyricist	Notes	Ref.
2020	Krishna and His Leela	Yes	Yes	No		
2020	Maa Vintha Gaadha Vinuma	Yes	Yes	Yes	for the songs "Jaana" and "Shayar-E-Ishq"	
2022	DJ Tillu	Yes	No	No		
2024	Tillu Square	Yes	No	Yes	for the song "Oh My Lily"	

=== Television ===
Year	Title	Role	Network
2018	Gangstars	Ajay	Amazon Prime Video

== Discography ==
Year	Work	Song	Composer	Notes
2016	Guntur Talkies	"Guntur Talkies" Title Track	Sricharan Pakala	
2016	Naruda Donoruda	"Kaasu Paisa"	Sricharan Pakala	
2016	Naruda Donoruda	"Pelli Beatu"	Sricharan Pakala	Rap portions
2020	Maa Vintha Gaadha Vinuma	"Shayar-E-Ishq"	Joy Rayarala	
2022	DJ Tillu	"Nuvvala"	Sricharan Pakala	
