= Bhairavam =

2025 Indian film by Vijay Kanakamedala

- Theatrical release poster
- Directed by: Vijay Kanakamedala
- Written by: R. S. Durai Senthilkumar
- Based on: Garudan (2024)
- Produced by: K. K. Radhamohan
- Starring: Bellamkonda Sai Sreenivas; Manchu Manoj; Nara Rohith; Aditi Shankar
- Cinematography: Hari K. Vedantam
- Edited by: Chota K. Prasad
- Music by: Sricharan Pakala
- Production company: Sri Sathya Sai Arts
- Release date: 30 May 2025
- Running time: 155 minutes
- Country: India
- Language: Telugu
- Box office: ₹16.75 crore

Bhairavam is a 2025 Indian Telugu-language action drama film directed by Vijay Kanakamedala and produced by K. K. Radhamohan, under Sri Sathya Sai Arts. It was presented by Dr. Jayantilal Gada of Pen Studios. The film stars Bellamkonda Sai Sreenivas, Manchu Manoj, Nara Rohith, Aditi Shankar, Anandhi and Divya Pillai in the leading roles. It is a remake of the Tamil film Garudan (2024).

Bhairavam was released worldwide on 30 May 2025 and received mixed reviews from critics and became a commercial failure, grossing over ₹16.75 crore at the box office.

== Plot ==
Gajapathi and Varada are close childhood friends living in Devipuram, Andhra Pradesh. During their childhood, Seenu, an orphan, saves Gajapathi from danger, and he takes in Seenu as a form of gratitude. Seenu became loyal to Gajapathi. The three of them grew up in the care of Gajapathi's grandmother, Nagarathnamma, the head of the trustee committee of the Vaarahi Amma temple. Being a zamin heir, Gajapathi lives in poverty with a meagre income from his brick kiln, while Varada owns a few lorries. Gajapathi and Varada remain powerful in Devipuram while presiding and managing as temple trustees.

Meanwhile, Vedurupalli Venkateswara Rao, the Registration Department Minister, plans to usurp unclaimed land worth ₹1000 crores near Devipuram and learns that the land belongs to the Vaarahi Amma temple while the original deed is in a jewellery box in the temple. After Nagarathnamma's death, Nagaraj, Venkateshwara Rao's relative, plans to become the temple committee head at his instruction. However, Seenu becomes the temple committee head with the support of Varada and Gajapathi. To somehow redeem the bond, Nagaraj provokes Gajapathi's wife, Neelima, and his brother-in-law, Puli Ravindra, by kindling their greed for money. Venkateshwara Rao forces CI Partha Saradhi to join his coercion to aid Nagaraj in his plan.

Puli, angry with Varada for forcing him to marry a Muslim girl, whom he had cheated, stirs up trouble between Varada and Gajapathi. After discovering fake jewels in the temple's jewellery box and Gajapathi's involvement with it, Varada hands him over to the police, thinking of bailing him out using his property. Nagaraj and Puli stops him, who brings the actual jewellery. The conflict deepens as Gajapathi feels betrayed. On the day of the temple festival, they plan to attack the jewellery box-carrying van during transport from the bank to the temple, but Varada thwarts them. At the festival, a fight unfolds between Varada and Nagaraj's henchmen. Gajapathi pretends to fight the thieves. Seenu, possessed by the divine, chops off Puli's hand and saves Varada.

Realising that he cannot take the deed as long as Varada is alive, Gajapathi takes Seenu to Maredumilli, leaves him there and returns along with Nagaraj and his henchmen to kill Varada. Varada's wife, Poornima, advises handing over the bond so they can use a portion of the land's ₹20 crores for Devipuram's development works. Varada accepts, but Gajapathi, Nagaraj and Puli brutally kill Varada. Seenu follows Gajapathi from Maredumilli only to get called to Varada's house for lunch. Seenu finds Varada dead but does not betray Gajapathi due to his loyalty towards him. Gajapathi informs Seenu that he killed Varada only in self-defence. Gajapathi escapes the punishment as Poornima tries but fails to find any witness. Varada's son Teja, who wanted to avenge his father's death, tries to kill Gajapathi, but Seenu stops him.

Seenu takes him to protect Teja to a different town. Nagaraj spots the duo and tries to kill Teja, but Seenu kills Nagaraj and surrenders to the police station. When Gajapathi comes and inquires, Seenu confesses that he killed Nagaraj and Puli. At the police station lock-up, Gajapathi's former business partner informs that he was behind Nagarathnamma's death as she resisted Gajapathi from substituting the temple jewels with the fake ones. The business partner had recorded Gajapathi's plan of adding the poison to Nagarathnamma's food and later showed the videos to Varada, who went to question Gajapathi, resulting in his death. On his way to appear before the magistrate, Seenu escapes and goes to Gajapathi's brick kiln to seek justice. Realising that Seenu knows the truth, Gajapathi brutally attacks Seenu.

Seenu, beaten harshly by Gajapathi, is possessed by the divine again ultimately killing Gajapathi's goons and mortally injuring Gajapathi. Gajapathi felt remorseful and guilty for killing Nagarathnamma and Varada. He apologies to Seenu for the sins he committed before succumbed to his injuries. CI Partha Sarathi provides this information to his superior officer as a detailed report along with his resignation. The police officer secretly tells Venkateshwara Rao that if Seenu is convicted, the law will punish him and his associates for the murders and the temple land theft. In the end credits, Venkateshwara Rao gets brutally killed by Seenu, who is portrayed as the saviour of Dharma. Without another choice, Seenu is released and reunites with Vennela.

== Cast ==
- Bellamkonda Sai Sreenivas as Seenu
- Manchu Manoj as Gajapathi Varma
- Nara Rohith as Varada
- Aditi Shankar as Vennela, Seenu’s love-interest
- Anandhi as Neelima, Gajapathi’s wife
- Divya Pillai as Purnima, Varada’s wife
- Jayasudha as Nagarathnamma, Gajapathi’s grandmother
- Ajay as Nagaraju
- Raja Ravindra as Sub Inspector of Police
- Sharath Lohithaswa as Minister Vedurupalli Venkateswara Rao
- Sandeep Raj as Puli Ravindra, Neelima’s brother and Gajapathi’s brother-in-law
- Vennela Kishore as Sundarachari
- Sampath Raj as CI
- Goparaju Ramana as Veera Puli, Neelima and Ravindra’s father
- Rajitha as Neelima and Ravindra’s mother
- Inaya Sultana
- Koya Kishore
- Bhanu Prakash
- Ramesh Reddy

== Production ==
On 4 November 2024, Sri Sathya Sai Arts announced the film Bhairavam, helmed by Naandhi (2021) and Ugram (2023) fame director Vijay Kanakamedala, featuring Bellamkonda Sai Sreenivas in the lead role. The film is an official remake of the Tamil-language film Garudan. Manoj Manchu and Nara Rohith were cast to play important roles. Aditi Shankar was cast as the female lead, marking her Telugu film debut, and Anandhi, Divya Pillai, Vennela Kishore alongside Ajay, Sandeep Raj and Sharath Lohithaswa joined the cast to portray supporting roles. The principal photography wrapped up in May 2025.

== Music ==
The music and background score is composed by Sricharan Pakala. The first single, "Oo Vennela", released on 3 January 2025.

Track listing
No.	Title	Writer(s)	Singer(s)	Length
1.	"O Venella"	Tirupathi Jaavana	Anurag Kulkarni, Yamini Ghantasala	3:07
2.	"Dum Dumaare"	Bhaskarabhatla	L. V. Revanth, Sahithi Chaganti, Soujanya Bhagavatula	3:48
3.	"Gichhamaaku"	Kasarla Shyam	Dhanunjay Seepana, Soujanya Bhagavatula	3:40
4.	"Theme of Varada"	Purna Chary	Prudhvi Chandra	3:16
5.	"Bhairavam Theme"	Chaitanya Prasad	Shankar Mahadevan	3:48
6.	"Theme of Gajapathi"	Purnachary Challury	Sricharan Pakala, Kranthi Kiran	3:51

== Release ==
=== Theatrical ===
Bhairavam was theatrically released on 30 May 2025.

=== Home Media ===
The satellite and post-streaming theatrical rights were acquired by Zee Telugu and ZEE5, for ₹32 crores.

== Critical reception ==
Paul Nicodemus of The Times of India rated the film 3/5 stars and wrote, "The first half feels stretched, weighed down by predictable beats and song placements. Post-interval, the narrative gains momentum with a twist in the Mamidi Thota sequence that heightens the emotional stakes." Giving the same rating, Sanjay Ponnappa of India Today wrote, "If one enjoys emotions, drama, action, song and dance—pure commercial entertainment—'Bhairavam' is certainly worth a watch. But beware: it defies logic, gravity, and sense whenever the opportunity presents itself."

Pratyusha Sista of Telangana Today wrote, "Bhairavam is a powerful, emotional drama wrapped in rich visuals and strong performances. It stays true to its roots while offering something fresh, making it a perfect pick for a weekend watch." Jalapathy Gudelli of Telugucinema.com gave it 2.5/5 and wrote, "“Bhairavam”, bolstered by its original Tamil version, presents a strong theme of justice versus loyalty and features some strong sequences. However, the film is a mixed bag—partly engaging and partly underwhelming—as director Vijay Kanakamedala attempts to give a ‘commercial; coating to an otherwise rooted narrative."

B. H. Harsh of Cinema Express gave it 2/5 stars and wrote, "There is great potential in the story but Vijay Kanakamedala tires the audience down with his stereotypically melodramatic treatment of the material". Srivathsan Nadadhur of The Hindu wrote, "Inept casting and bland execution work against ‘Bhairavam’, director Vijay Kanakamedala's remake of the Tamil hit ‘Garudan’".
