= Pranav Chaganty =

- Genre: Telugu rap
- Occupations: Rapper, lyricist, playback singer
- Years active: 2016–present

Pranav Chaganty (aka AbhinavaKavi) is an Indian rapper, lyricist, and playback singer known for his contributions to Telugu rap music. He is recognized for pioneering the fusion of traditional Telugu cultural elements with contemporary rap music. His work often addresses social issues and promotes cultural awareness through music.

== Early life and education ==
AbhinavaKavi was born into a middle-class Indian family where academic success was highly emphasized. He completed his engineering degree from Vignana Bharathi Institute of Technology (VBIT). Following his education, he served as an electrical engineer in the Indian Navy.

== Career ==
=== Career transition ===
During his service in the Navy, AbhinavaKavi discovered his passion for music while at sea. This experience led him to leave his engineering career to pursue music full-time. He subsequently enrolled in a music production course in Chennai and began teaching Western classical music, which served as a stepping stone to his eventual career in rap.

=== Musical style and themes ===
AbhinavaKavis musical style is characterized by a deep respect for the Telugu language, which he uses to craft intricate lyrics that resonate with listeners. His work notably incorporates Dvyakshari, a traditional Telugu poetic form that utilizes two-letter syllables to convey complex thoughts.

His thematic focus includes:

- Social justice and reform initiatives
- Cultural pride and Telugu heritage preservation
- Personal narratives and emotional experiences

AbhinavaKavi views rap as a powerful medium for social commentary, using it to initiate discussions about important societal issues while promoting Telugu cultural heritage.

== Filmography ==
| Song | Film | Lyrics | Vocals | Music director | Reference |
|---|---|---|---|---|---|
| "Yama Greatu" | Kaala | ✅ | ✅ | Santosh Narayanan | |
| "Poradathaam" | Kaala | ✅ | ✅ | Santosh Narayanan | |
| "Maa Veedhula" | Kaala | ✅ | ✅ | Santosh Narayanan | |
| "Padmavyuham" | Yuddham Saranam | ✅ | ✅ | Vivek Sagar | |
| "Love All the Haters" | Bomma Blockbuster | ✅ | ✅ | Prashanth Vihari | |
| "Seatu Siragadha" | A1 Express | ✅ (rap) | ✅ (rap) | HipHop Tamizha | |
| "Enduku Ra" | Krishna & His Leela | ✅ (rap) | ✅ (rap) | Sricharan Pakala | |
| "Maha Theme" | Aakasam Nee Haddura | ✅ | ❌ | G.V. Prakash Kumar | |
| "College Age lona" | Ee Nagaraniki Emaindi | ✅ (rap) | ✅ (rap) | Vivek Sagar | |
| "One Life" | Sir | ✅ | ✅ | G.V. Prakash Kumar | |
| "Sandhya na Udayiddaam" | Sir | ✅ | ❌ | G.V. Prakash Kumar | |
| "Bagundayya Chandram" | Mental Madhilo | ✅ (rap) | ✅ (rap) | Prashanth Vihari | |
| "Ee Zindagi" | Mrithyunjay | ✅ (rap) | ✅ (rap) | Kaala Bhairava | |

== Independent works ==
| Album | Role | Lyrics | Performance |
|---|---|---|---|
| Pani Puri Anthem | Singing | Yes | Yes |
| Hyderabadi Chai Anthem | Singing | Yes | Yes |
| Telugu Flow | Singing | Yes | Yes |
| Kothi Kommacchi | Singing | Yes | Yes |
| Modern Dvyakshari | Singing | Yes | Yes |
| Drunkard On The Road | Singing | Yes | Yes |
| Express Prema | Singing | No | Yes |

== Impact and influence ==
AbhinavaKavi is considered a significant figure in the evolution of Telugu rap music. His innovative approach to combining traditional Telugu poetic forms with contemporary rap has created a unique sub-genre that appeals to both traditional and modern audiences. Through his music, he has demonstrated the versatility of Telugu language in modern musical forms while addressing contemporary social issues.
