= Ugandhar Muni =

Indian film director

- Born: 1 January 1989 (age 37); Mumbai, Maharashtra, India
- Occupations: Film director; screenwriter
- Years active: 2021–present

Ugandhar Muni is an Indian film director who primarily works in Telugu cinema. He directed the thriller films A (Ad Infinitum) (2021) and Shambhala (2025).

Ugandhar Muni's upcoming directorial 'Karikaala' is a socio-fantasy movie and is going to be released as a 2-part movie, and stars Sundeep Kishan and Catherine Tresa.

== Career ==
Ugandhar Muni made his directorial debut with the Telugu drama and thriller A (Ad Infinitum), which was released in 2021. For this film, he made an attempt at the thriller genre by exploring a premise centered around the idea that "Science demands sacrifice". However, the film received mixed critical reviews regarding its slow narration and scientific logic, though the conclusion left space for a potential sequel.

His next directorial venture was the mystic and supernatural thriller Shambhala, which was released in 2025. He first conceived the core idea for the film three years prior to its release and worked tirelessly on the project for nearly two years. As part of his writing process, Ugandhar Muni conducted extensive research on the environmental and geographical effects of meteor impact zones, specifically studying real-life incidents that occurred in Brazil. Shambhala emerged as a commercial success, steadily improving its box office collections. While some critics felt the film suffered from a sluggish and repetitive screenplay in the middle act, others commended Ugandhar Muni's disciplined storytelling and his ability to conjure a dread-inducing, 1980s atmospheric setting.

Following this, he announced that his next directorial project will also fall under his favored supernatural and thriller genres. The film will star Sundeep Kishan.

Ugandhar Muni's third project 'Karikaala' is confirmed to be a 2-part movie. The movie team announced that the first part of the movie will release on 2 July 2027 and the second part of the movie will release on 28 October 2027. Karikaala is a socio-fantasy genre movie, and Sundeep Kishan will be playing the lead role in the movie. Catherine Tresa, Sakshi Mhadolkar, and Gayatri Bharadwaj are reported to be starring in the 2-part movie.

== Filmography ==
Year	Title	Notes	Ref.
2021	A (Ad Infinitum)		
2025	Shambhala		
2027	Karikaala	Karikaala is a socio-fantasy movie and is going to be released as a 2-part movie. The movie team announced the first part release date as 2 July 2027 and the second part release date as 28 October 2027.	
