= Tillu Square =

2024 Indian film by Mallik Ram

- Theatrical release poster
- Directed by: Mallik Ram
- Written by: Siddhu Jonnalagadda; Ravi Anthony Pudota; Mallik Ram; Kalyan Shankar
- Produced by: Naga Vamsi; Sai Soujanya
- Starring: Siddhu Jonnalagadda; Anupama Parameswaran
- Cinematography: Sai Prakash Ummadisingu
- Edited by: Naveen Nooli
- Music by: Songs: Ram Miriyala; Achu Rajamani; Score: Bheems Ceciroleo
- Production companies: Sithara Entertainments; Fortune Four Cinemas
- Distributed by: Srikara Studios
- Release date: 29 March 2024
- Running time: 123 minutes
- Country: India
- Language: Telugu

Tillu Square (stylised as (TILLU)²) is a 2024 Indian Telugu-language crime comedy film directed by Mallik Ram and produced by Naga Vamsi under the banner of Sithara Entertainments and Fortune Four Cinemas. A sequel to the 2022 film DJ Tillu, Siddhu Jonnalagadda reprises his role from the previous film, while Anupama Parameswaran plays the female lead.

The film was officially announced in June 2022 and principal photography began in August 2022. Ram Miriyala, Achu Rajamani and Bheems Ceciroleo are the film's music directors.

Tillu Square has seen multiple postponements in its release due to post-production issues. It was scheduled for a worldwide release on 9 February 2024, but was postponed to accommodate Eagle from a five-way Sankranti clash.

It released on 29 March 2024 in theaters worldwide to positive reviews from critics and audiences. A sequel, titled Tillu Cube, will be the third film in the franchise.

== Plot ==
After escaping with drug lord Shannon's money, (Note: Following the events of DJ Tillu (2022).) Tillu sets up Tillu Events, an event management company, which organizes DJs for weddings and parties. At one such party, Tillu meets Lilly Joseph and falls for her. They have a one-night stand, but Lilly disappears in the morning, leaving a note, which disappoints Tillu.

After a month of searching for Lilly, Tillu finds her at a hospital following his father's colonoscopy. Lilly reveals that she is pregnant with Tillu's child and they decide to get married. On Tillu's birthday, Lilly invites Tillu to an apartment, which Tillu recognises is the same apartment Radhika had invited him to on his previous birthday. Lilly reveals that she is looking for her missing brother Rohit, who was killed by Radhika a year prior. Lilly gets Tillu to drive to Rohit's burial site along with her colleague, Purushotham. Tillu, while trying to escape from the scene, gets kidnapped by Shannon. However, Tillu is rescued by Lilly, who kills Shannon's men.

Lilly reveals that she is not really pregnant or Rohit's sister, but is actually an undercover ISF agent assigned to kill the notorious international crime boss Sheikh Mehboob wanted by the RAW. Lilly has been tricking Tillu, who was invited to DJ at Mehboob's party in Hyderabad. She and her team have been attempting to kill Mehboob for several years, but Mehboob always avoided them with the help of an informant within ISF. She blackmails Tillu with a video of him and Radhika burying Rohit in order to get him to kill Mehboob at his party using poisoned dessert. Later, Lilly tells Tillu that she did genuinely have feelings for him even though she tricked him for her mission.

On the day of Mehboob's party, Tillu attempts to leave Hyderabad with his family to escape Lilly, but she stops him and shows them a captive Radhika, who is now engaged to marry someone else. Lilly threatens to imprison Radhika and Tillu for 14 years if Tillu does not cooperate with her. Radhika convinces Tillu to cooperate with Lilly for the sake of her marriage. At the party, Tillu gives the sweets to Mehboob, but Mehboob already knows that they are poisoned after being told by his informant. Mehboob detains Tillu, which forces Lilly's team to abandon the mission. Mehboob thrashes Tillu and seemingly kills him.

A week later, Lilly is surprised to see Tillu alive and well. Tillu reveals that he escaped from Mehboob by negotiating with Shannon to poison the milk that Mehboob drank and then forcing Mehboob to release Tillu and gives him 14 crores in exchange for the antidote. Tillu tips off the ISF chief about Mehboob and ISF agents arrest Mehboob once he receives his antidote. Lilly is surprised as the mission was to kill Mehboob, but Tillu reveals that killing Mehboob was only Lilly's plan and that Lilly is actually Mehboob's mole within ISF. She had been trying to kill Mehboob so that he would not be taken alive and reveal her identity. Lilly gets arrested and she asks Tillu why he bailed out Radhika, but allowed her to get arrested, to which Tillu responds that Radhika had deceived him after falling in love with him, while Lilly had only fallen in love with him to deceive him. It is hinted that the story would continue in Tillu Cube.

== Cast ==
- Siddhu Jonnalagadda as Bala Gangadhar Tilak alias "DJ Tillu"
- Anupama Parameswaran as Lilly Joseph, Tillu's love interest, ISF Spy
- Neha Shetty as M. Radhika, Tillu’s ex-love interest (cameo appearance)
- Murali Sharma as Sheikh Mehboob
- C. V. L. Narasimha Rao as Lilly's father
- Priyanka Jawalkar as girl in pub (cameo appearance)
- Brahmaji as Inspector Rao (cameo appearance)
- Anish Kuruvilla as ISF chief
- Prince Cecil as Shannon Gonzales
- Muralidhar Goud as Tillu's father
- Lakshmi Sujatha as Tillu's mother
- Fish Venkat
- Narra Srinivas as Chandrakant (cameo appearance)
- Udbhav Raghu as Purushotham
- Praneeth Reddy Kallem as Marcus, Tillu's friend
- Sri Ram
- Manik Reddy
- Geddam Srinivas
- Kalyan
- Nellore Neeraja
- Abhinav Singh Raghav
- Raj Tirandasu as Jonathan
- Kireeti Damaraju as Photographer Rohit (cameo appearance)

== Production ==
=== Development ===
In February 2022, before DJ Tillu's release, Jonnalagadda stated plans of a sequel for the film and said "There are no limits to Tillu's character and I think, this can be explored and stretched to any length". The sequel was officially announced in June 2022. Mallik Ram, who previously directed Naruda Donoruda and Adbhutham, was announced as the director, replacing Vimal Krishna from the first film. Naga Vamsi returned as the producer.

=== Filming ===
Principal photography began in August 2022.

== Soundtrack ==
The soundtrack of the film was composed by Ram Miriyala and Achu Rajamani and the score was composed by Bheems Ceciroleo. Aditya Music serves as the music banner. The first single, "Ticket Eh Konakunda", released on 26 July 2023. The next single, "Radhika", was released on 27 November 2023.

Track listing
No.	Title	Lyrics	Music	Singer(s)	Length
1.	"Ticket Eh Konakunda"	Kasarla Shyam	Ram Miriyala	Ram Miriyala	4:05
2.	"Radhika"	Kasarla Shyam	Ram Miriyala	Ram Miriyala	3:08
3.	"Oh My Lily"	Siddhu Jonnalagadda	Achu Rajamani	Sreerama Chandra	3:21
4.	"DJ Tillu Revamp"	Kasarla Shyam	Ram Miriyala	Ram Miriyala	3:44

== Release ==
=== Theatrical ===
Tillu Square was initially planned for a theatrical release in March 2023, but was postponed due to production work to 15 September 2023. The movie was then postponed due to delays in the post production to 9 February 2024 before finally being postponed to 29 March 2024, to accommodate Eagle from a five-way Sankranti clash.

=== Home media ===
The digital distribution rights of the film were acquired by Netflix.

== Reception ==
Tillu Square received generally positive reviews from critics with praise for Jonnalagadda’s performance, humour, and soundtrack, but criticism for its story and predictability.

Paul Nicodemus of The Times of India gave 3 1/2 / 5 stars and wrote "Tillu Square is a captivating entertainer that guarantees smiles and leaves the audience feeling elated and satisfied. It’s a must-watch for anyone seeking two hours of fun-filled entertainment". Avad Mohammed of OTTplay gave 3 1/2 / 5 stars and wrote "Tillu Square lives up to the hype and has the right dose of comedy, twists, and romance. The one-liners, Siddhu Jonnalagadda's stand-out act, and Anuapam Parameswaran's shocking new avatar are the icing on the cake."

Priyanka Sundar of Firstpost gave three out of five stars and wrote "The one thing that was unfortunate in Tillu Square is the makers attempt to include bits and pieces that was a call back to the original". Raghu Bandi of The Indian Express gave three out of five stars and wrote "Tillu Square is filled with punchy one-liners. Most of them refer generously to DJ Tillu. If you have seen the first part, your enjoyment of this film might be multifold. Even otherwise, the comedy here is excellent".

Janani K of India Today gave three out of five stars and wrote "All in all, Siddhu Jonnalagadda's Tillu Square is an entertaining film that works for the most part. The film's comedy and Siddhu's performance are its major strengths helping it match to the hype of its prequel DJ Tillu". BVS Prakash of Deccan Chronicle gave two out of five and wrote "Siddhu Jonnalagadda is back in his elements and evokes enough fun with his comic-punchlines and unique mannerisms, but it is not enough to pull off a 2 and half hour film that rides on an impossible mission".

Ram Venkat Srikar of Film Companion wrote "Siddhu Jonnalagadda's sequel rights the wrongs of the original to deliver a frequently funny outing". Sangeetha Devi Dundoo of The Hindu wrote "A terrific Siddhu Jonnalagadda and smart writing make Tillu Square a fun ride as the sequel builds on the familiarity of the first film".

== Sequel ==
A sequel's title, Tillu Cube, was revealed before the end credits of the film.
