= C. V. L. Narasimha Rao =

Indian actor (born 1952)

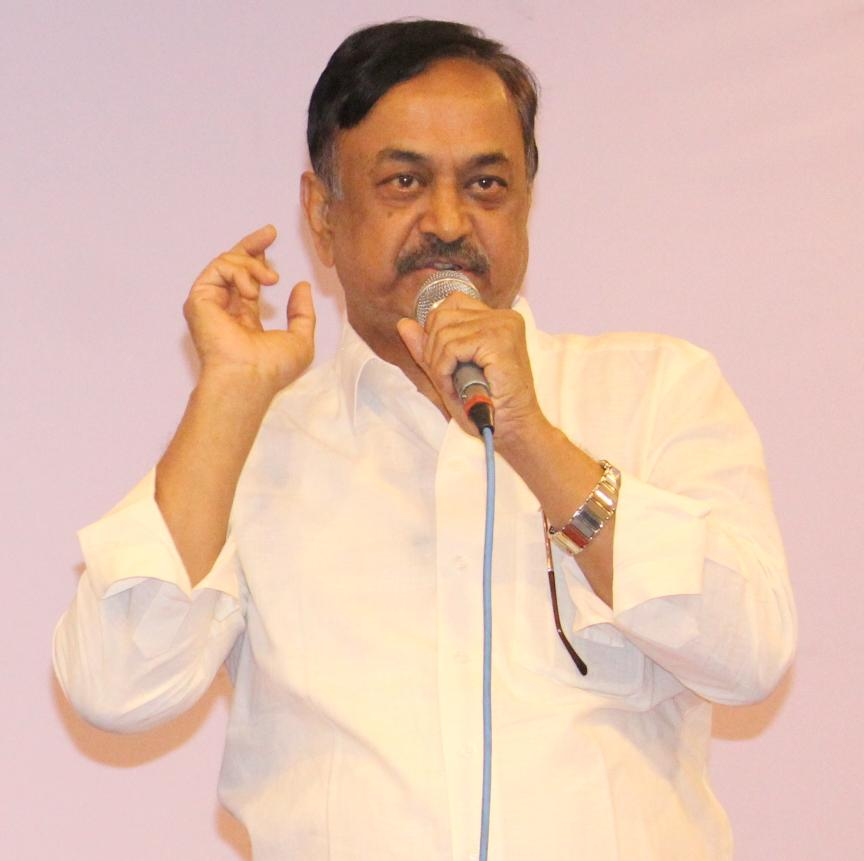
- Born: Hyderabad, Telangana, India
- Occupations: Actor, thespian
- Years active: 1987–present

C. V. L. Narasimha Rao is an Indian character actor known for his works in Telugu cinema, theatre, television, and radio. Rao is one of the senior member, and legal advisor in the Movie Artist's Association of Hyderabad.

== Career ==
Narasimha Rao is a criminal lawyer, and advocate, who later turned into acting through telefilms. He directed and produced a film based on the Telangana movement called Ratanala Veena (2011).

== Filmography ==
- Maharshi (1987)
- Ashwini (1991)
- Raat/Ratri (1992) (Bilingual)
- Akka Chellelu (1993)
- Ninne Pelladatha (1996)
- Akka! Bagunnava? (1996)
- Sindhooram (1997)
- Ganesh (1998)
- Naa Hrudayamlo Nidurinche Cheli (1999)
- Samudram (1999)
- Subbu (2001)
- Aithe (2003)
- Tagore (2003)
- Malliswari (2004)
- Venky (2004)
- Rakhi (2006)
- Godavari (2006)
- Annavaram (2006)
- Dubai Seenu (2007)
- Ready (2008)
- Black & White (2008)
- Homam (2008)
- Souryam (2008)
- Nenu Meeku Telusa? (2008)
- Pravarakhyudu (2009)
- Amaravathi (2009)
- Adhurs (2010)
- Rushi (2012)
- Andala Rakshasi (2012)
- Life Is Beautiful (2012)
- Anaamika (2014)
- Oohalu Gusagusalade (2014)
- Ala Ela (2014)
- Yevade Subramanyam (2015)
- Raja Cheyyi Vesthe (2016)
- Prematho Mee Karthik (2017)
- Awe (2018)
- Kavacham (2018)
- 118 (2019)
- 90 ML (2019)
- Subramanyam (2019)
- Majili (2019)
- Kousalya Krishnamurthy (2019)
- Venky Mama (2020)
- Disco Raja (2020)
- Aswathama (2020)
- Pressure Cooker (2020)
- Shivan (2020)
- Maa Vintha Gaadha Vinuma (2020)
- Naandhi (2021)
- Drushyam 2 (2021)
- Check (2021)
- Lawyer Viswanath (2021)
- Jathi Ratnalu (2021)
- Vakeel Saab (2021)
- The Killer (2021)
- Tuck Jagadish (2021)
- Acharya (2022)
- First Day First Show (2022)
- O Saathiya (2023)
- Natho Nenu (2023)
- My Name Is Shruthi (2023)
- Siddharth Roy (2024) as Dr. Ramana Gopisetti
- Tillu Square (2024)
- Kali (2024)
- Shanmukha (2025)
