= Naruda Donoruda =

2016 film

- Poster of the Movie
- Directed by: Mallik Ram
- Written by: Kittu Vissapragada
- Story by: Juhi Chaturvedi
- Based on: Vicky Donor (Hindi)
- Produced by: Supriya Yarlagadda; John Sudheer Pudhota
- Starring: Sumanth; Pallavi Subhash; Tanikella Bharani
- Cinematography: Shaneil Deo
- Edited by: Karthika Srinivas
- Music by: Sricharan Pakala
- Production companies: Annapurna Studios; Rama Reels
- Release date: 4 November 2016
- Running time: 131 minutes
- Country: India
- Language: Telugu

Naruda Donoruda is a 2016 Indian Telugu-language romantic comedy film, directed by Mallik Ram and produced by Supriya Yarlagadda and John Sudheer Pudhota. The film is a remake of the 2012 Hindi film Vicky Donor. It stars Sumanth and Pallavi Subhash in lead roles, while Tanikella Bharani plays a pivotal role. The music was composed by Sricharan Pakala and released on Aditya Music. The film was released on 4 November 2016.

== Plot ==
Vicky (Sumanth), an unemployed man, with seemingly no purpose in life, lives with his grandmother and widowed mother (Rajya Lakshmi). Their family survives on a beauty parlour business. Dr Aanjaneyulu (Tanikella Bharani) runs an infertility clinic, and is in search of a good sperm donor. He comes across Vicky, and is enamored by him and his forefathers. After some convincing, Vicky eventually starts selling his sperm to Aanjaneyulu, filling the lives of many childless couples with joy. It's a win-win for Vicky and Aanjaneyulu as both grow rich.

Meanwhile, Vicky falls in love with a divorced bank employee, Aashima Roy (Pallavi Subhash). Never revealing that he's a sperm donor, Vicky marries her. But problems arise when Aashima gets to know the truth. Vicky eventually reconciles with his wife, after Aanjaneyulu helps her understand the true benefits of sperm donation.

== Cast ==
- Sumanth as Vikram "Vicky"
- Pallavi Subhash as Ashima Roy
- Tanikella Bharani as Dr. Anjeneyulu
- Suman Setty as Koti
- Rajyalakshmi as Vikram's mother

== Soundtrack ==
Naruda Donoruda

Soundtrack album by Sricharan Pakala
- Released: 2016
- Recorded: 2016
- Studio: Studio 102; Studio ONE; Abbey Road Studios
- Genre: Feature film soundtrack
- Length: 26:35
- Label: Aditya Music
- Producer: Sricharan Pakala

Sricharan Pakala chronology
Guntur Talkies (2016)	Naruda Donoruda (2016)	PSV Garuda Vega (2017)
External audio
- Official Audio Jukebox on YouTube

Music composed by Sricharan Pakala. Music released on Aditya Music.

Track list
No.	Title	Lyrics	Singer(s)	Length
1.	"Theerame"	Kittu Vissapragada	Naresh Iyer, Sri Vidya	04:49
2.	"Alalu Aagavala"	Krishna Madineni	Poojan Kohli, Soundarya Sakalya	04:22
3.	"Pelli Beatu" (Rap: Sricharan Pakala, Rahul Ganapathi, Siddu Jonnalagadda, Lanka Sonthoshi)	Chaitanya Prasad	Poojan Kohli, Jyotsna Pakala, Saicharan Pakala	03:02
4.	"Kaasu Paisa"	Kittu Vissapragada	Siddu Jonnalagadda, S.Anant Srikar, Vedala Hemachandra	02:41
5.	"Ayyo Baasu"	Kittu Vissapragada	Mohammed Abid Ali	02:57
6.	"Roju Ila"	Kittu Vissapragada	Hemachandra, Geetha Madhuri	03:11
7.	"Nee Valane"	Chaitanya Prasad	Ishaq Vali, Saicharan Pakala, S.Anant Srikar	03:32
8.	"Nee Valane(Sad)"	Chaitanya Varma	Sri Vidya, Sricharan Pakala	02:01
Total length:				26:35

== Reception ==
=== Critical reception ===
Deccan Chronicle gave 2 out of 5 stars stating "Naruda Donaruda is a fresh subject which could have been made much better. Except for Thanikella Bharani’s performance in a few scenes, the movie has nothing interesting. And it’s not a good comeback for Sumanth". The Indian Express stated "Watch it for Tanikella Bharani’s performance. But don’t expect it to be a joyride right through. Entertainment is on offer only in parts, the rest is boring".
