= DJ Tillu =

2022 film by Vimal Krishna

- Theatrical release poster
- Directed by: Vimal Krishna
- Written by: Vimal Krishna; Siddhu Jonnalagadda
- Produced by: Naga Vamsi
- Starring: Siddhu Jonnalagadda; Neha Shetty; Prince Cecil
- Cinematography: Sai Prakash Ummadisingu
- Edited by: Naveen Nooli
- Music by: Songs: Sricharan Pakala; Ram Miriyala (1 song); Score: Thaman S
- Production companies: Sithara Entertainments; Fortune Four Cinemas
- Release date: 12 February 2022
- Running time: 124 minutes
- Country: India
- Language: Telugu
- Box office: est. ₹30.30 crore

DJ Tillu is a 2022 Indian Telugu-language crime comedy film directed by debutant Vimal Krishna who co-wrote the film with Siddhu Jonnalagadda. Produced by Naga Vamsi, the film stars Jonnalagadda as the titular character alongside Neha Shetty, Prince Cecil and Brahmaji.

The film was announced in October 2020 under the title Narudi Brathuku Natana. Principal photography began in February 2021 with filming taking place in Hyderabad. The background score was scored by S. Thaman while the soundtrack was composed by Sricharan Pakala and Ram Miriyala. Initially scheduled to be released on 14 January 2022, it was postponed due to the COVID-19 pandemic in India.

DJ Tillu was released theatrically on 12 February 2022 and received mixed to positive reviews from critics, becoming a blockbuster at the box office. A sequel titled Tillu Square was released on 29 March 2024 with most of the cast returning to reprise their roles.

== Plot ==
Bala Gangadhar Tilak alias DJ Tillu is an aspiring disk jockey who meets Radhika in a club and asks her for a drink to which she agrees. After the drinks, Tillu drops Radhika at her apartment. While walking towards her apartment, she then goes into her room to pack her luggage and an enraged Rohit tries to assault her. In self-defense, Radhika shoves Rohit, which causes him to hit his head on the wall and die from the injury.

Radhika asks Tillu to come to her apartment. Tillu arrives and sees all the photos in the room with Rohit and also Rohit's corpse. Tillu gets scared and tells Radhika to call the police, but Radhika does not want to call the police as she is afraid that she will be sentenced to prison for killing Rohit. She explains everything to Tillu and they decide to bury the body somewhere. As they are burying Rohit's body, a drunk man named Chandrakant sees them and films the act. He blackmails Tillu and Radhika for ₹25 lakh in two days in order for the video not to be leaked. Radhika claims that she knows a club owner Shannon is involved in illegal business and can obtain the money from him. She then manages to seduce Shannon and steals ₹2 crore. Frustrated on how Radhika obtains the money and seeing the way she seduces Shannon, Tillu gets into an argument with Radhika.

Seeing the fight, CI Rao stops Tillu and Radhika. To escape from the situation, Radhika pretends that she does not know Tillu and that she needs to be dropped off at her house. Shannon later finds Tillu at a tea stall and asks him about his money. Tillu tells Shannon that it was in his car and gets Shannon to drive to the earlier spot, but the car and the money are missing. He then finds the car and Radhika at the spot where they buried Rohit and Shannon finds his money. Radhika explains that Rao actually came into her apartment and found blood, threatened that he would get her arrested and attempted to assault her, but she managed to escape. Later, they are chased by Rao and Shannon is thrown out of the car. However, Tillu and Radhika escape and reach a hotel with the money. Radhika explains to Tillu that she tried to give the money to Chandrakant, but he also tried to assault her, which made her to leave the premises.

Tillu goes to the restroom, while Radhika leaves the hotel with the money. Shannon and Rao thrash Tillu, who goes into a coma and loses his memory. Tillu is then admitted to the hospital, where Shannon and Rao interrogate Tillu for the money and Rao's phone. With Tillu not remembering what happened, Rao files a case in court with Radhika and attempts to get them both arrested for the murder. During the case hearing in court, it is revealed that Tillu actually bribed Chandrakant and Rao's colleague Fish with a video and manages to get both Radhika and Rao arrested. A month later, Tillu visits Radhika in prison and explains that he never lost his memory and hatched a plan to find Radhika and obtain the money by bribing a music director, who behaved rudely with Radhika. He manages a bail order and gets Radhika released. Tillu explains that he helped her only because he felt bad for her. Later, Shannon calls Tillu and asks for his money, where Tillu tells him that the money is in Paris and that the plot would continue from there.

== Cast ==
- Siddhu Jonnalagadda as Bala Gangadhar Tilak alias "DJ Tillu"
- Neha Shetty as M. Radhika
- Prince Cecil as Shannon Gonzales, club owner
- Brahmaji as Inspector Rao
- Fish Venkat as Head Constable Fish
- Pragathi as Judge I. Sharada Devi
- Narra Srinivas as Chandrakant
- Raja Ravindra as Music Director
- Kireeti Damaraju as Photographer Rohit, Radhika's boyfriend
- Muralidhar Goud as Tillu's father
- Praneeth Reddy Kallem as Marcus, Tillu's friend

== Production ==
=== Development and casting ===
Vimal Krishna narrated the storyline of the film to actor Jonnalagadda in 2019, but production got delayed due to COVID-19 pandemic in India. The film was announced in October 2020 under the title Narudi Brathuku Natana. Director Trivikram Srinivas also guided Krishna and the team in designing the story and screenplay of the film. In an interview with The New Indian Express, Vimal Krishna revealed about the Tillu's character that, "During my initial days in Hyderabad, I happened to meet and interact with a few DJs and was really bowled over by their conversations, attitude and body language. They carry a different persona and each one is his own boss. I have infused these characteristics and developed Tillu's character". In January 2021, the film was then officially launched under the same title.

The film's title was then changed to DJ Tillu for a shorter name. About his character 'Tillu' in the film, Jonnalagadda told The Hindu that "I grew up in areas near Padmarao Nagar (in Hyderabad). Youngsters in Warasiguda and Chilkalguda talk like Tillu (the Hyderabadi Telangana dialect). We wanted Tillu to reflect on how these youngsters speak and how they handle things. Each one is his own boss and for no reason, there is the rivalry between gangs from each street. These boys are also more chilled out than those in, say, Banjara Hills."

=== Filming ===
Principal photography for the film began in February 2021 but was then later stopped due to the second lockdown in India. Filming was then resumed in June 2021.

== Soundtrack ==
DJ Tillu

Soundtrack album by Sricharan Pakala and Ram Miriyala
- Released: 9 February 2022
- Genre: Feature film soundtrack
- Length: 10:22
- Language: Telugu
- Label: Aditya Music
- Producers: Sricharan Pakala; Ram Miriyala
External audio
- Audio Jukebox on YouTube

Sricharan Pakala chronology
Thimmarusu (2021)	DJ Tillu (2022)	Major (2022)

Ram Miriyala chronology
Pushpaka Vimanam (2021)	DJ Tillu (2022)

Singles from DJ Tillu
- 1. "Tillu Anna DJ Pedithe" Released: 6 January 2022; 2. "Pataas Pilla" Released: 24 January 2022; 3. "Nuvvala" Released: 7 February 2022

Sricharan Pakala and Ram Miriyala composed the film's soundtrack. The audio rights were acquired by Aditya Music. In early-January 2022, Thaman S joined the production to compose the film score. Soon after, the first song "Tillu Anna DJ Pedithe" was released on 6 January 2022. Sung and composed by Ram Miriyala, the song became an instant chartbuster. The second song "Pataas Pilla" sung by Anirudh Ravichander, was released on 24 January 2022. The third song "Nuvvala" sung by Jonnalagadda, was released on 7 February 2022. While the female version of the song later released through the album on 9 February 2022.

No.	Title	Lyrics	Music	Singer(s)	Length
1.	"Tillu Anna DJ Pedithe"	Kasarla Shyam	Ram Miriyala	Ram Miriyala	3:03
2.	"Pataas Pilla"	Kittu Vissapragada	Sricharan Pakala	Anirudh Ravichander	3:12
3.	"Nuvvala"	Ravikanth Perepu	Sricharan Pakala	Siddhu Jonnalagadda	2:04
4.	"Nuvvala (Female version)"	Ravikanth Perepu	Sricharan Pakala	Yamini Ghantasala	2:01
Total length:					10:22

== Release ==
The film was initially scheduled to release on 14 January 2022 coinciding with the festival of Sankranthi due to the postponement of films such as RRR and Radhe Shyam. However, due to the restrictions on cinema due to COVID-19 pandemic in India the film was postponed. It was later decided that the film was going to release on 11 February 2022 along with Khiladi. In order to avoid the clash with Khiladi, DJ Tillu was then postponed to 12 February 2022. The film's theatrical distribution rights were sold for ₹8 crore.

=== Home media ===
The satellite and digital rights were acquired by Star Maa and Aha, respectively. It premiered on Aha on 4 March 2022.

== Reception ==
DJ TIllu received mixed reviews with some critics praising the "madcap fun moments", but criticising its narration.

=== Critical reception ===
Thadhagath Pathi of The Times of India gave three out of five stars and wrote "DJ Tillu relies heavily on dialogue and less on the actual story at hand. Such films usually end up being the perfect weekend watch, so this one's for you if you enjoy humour". Pinkvilla gave the film a rating of three out of five and wrote "DJ Tillu has more 'mass' in it than the introductory songs for top stars in mass masala movies. And Thaman's background music hits the ball out of the park, designed to make the scenes look like they have been choreographed to enable the BGM composer have a blast in the studio. The editing is solid, making the shots look consummately etched".

Deccan Chronicle gave the film a rating of three out of five and wrote "DJ Tillu is a breezy entertainer that has elements of fun and quirkiness. The writing was cool, but goes overboard towards the end. Watch out for Siddu's characterisation and performance". The Hans India gave the film a rating of 2 1/2 out of 5 and wrote "Vimal tried to keep the audience to sit with his narration. Thaman's background score is an asset. He keeps the tempo with his techno sounding. The songs are neat. The cinematography is adequate. Dialogue writing is a huge plus for this romantic crime thriller". News18 stated "Director Vimal Krishna did well, though he could’ve stretched his limits more, experts say. The movie is a one-time watch for a few laughs in the first half". Sangeetha Devi Dundoo of The Hindu stated "Director Vimal Krishna helms a laughter riot populated with quirky, morally ambiguous characters".

=== Box office ===
DJ Tillu grossed ₹8.1 crore (US$840,000) worldwide on its opening day, with ₹5.93 crore (US$620,000) coming from Andhra Pradesh and Telangana. It collected a worldwide share of ₹16.92 crore (equivalent to ₹18 crore or US$1.9 million in 2023) and grossed ₹29.7 crore (equivalent to ₹31 crore or US$3.3 million in 2023) until 5 March 2022. By the end of its theatrical run, DJ Tillu collected a worldwide gross of ₹30.30 crore with a distributor's share of ₹17.25 crore.
