= Tharagathi Gadhi Daati =

Indian web series

- Genre: Teen drama
- Written by: Kittu Vissapragada (Dialogues)
- Directed by: Mallik Ram
- Starring: Harshith Malgireddy; Payal Radhakrishna; Nikhil Devadula; Snehal Kamat
- Voices of: Sai Swetha; Vikaramaditya Kadiyala
- Composer: Naren RK Siddartha
- Country of origin: India
- Original language: Telugu
- No. of seasons: 1
- No. of episodes: 5

Production
- Executive producers: Shreyash Pandey; SN Swamy
- Producers: Anurabh Kumar; Kolla Praveena
- Cinematography: Monish Bhupathiraju
- Editor: Vinay
- Running time: 22 minutes
- Production companies: The Viral Fever; Kolla Entertainments

Original release
- Network: Aha
- Release: 20 August 2021

Tharagathi Gadhi Daati is an Indian Telugu-language teen drama streaming series directed by Mallik Ram. A remake of The Viral Fever's Hindi-language web series Flames, the series is produced by Anurabh Kumar and has an ensemble cast of Harshith Malgireddy, Payal Radhakrishna, Nikhil Devadula and Snehal Kamat. First season of the series was premiered on 20 August 2021 on Aha. The title of the web series is inspired from the song of the same name from the soundtrack album of the 2020 film Colour Photo.

== Cast ==
- Harshith Malgireddy as Krishna "Kittu"
- Payal Radhakrishna as Jasmine Rao
- Nikhil Devadula as Ravi
- Snehal Kamat as Madhu
- Vasu Inturi as father of Ravi
- Ramana Bhargav as father of Krishna
- Bindu Chandramouli as mother of Krishna
- Ashwath
- Mahendar
- Jayavani
- Laxmikala
- Sujatha
- Swapnika

== Episodes ==
No.	Title	Directed by	Written by	Original release date
1	"Oh Cheliya Naa Priya Sakhiya"	Mallik Ram	TVF	20 August 2021
2	"Eenade Edho Ayyindhi"	Mallik Ram	TVF	20 August 2021
3	"Prema Entha Madhuram"	Mallik Ram	TVF	20 August 2021
4	"Priyuralu Antha Khatinam"	Mallik Ram	TVF	20 August 2021
5	"Nuvvakada Nenikkada"	Mallik Ram	TVF	20 August 2021

== Soundtrack ==
All music is composed by Naren RK Siddartha.

Telugu (OST)
No.	Title	Lyrics	Singer(s)	Length
1.	"Tharagathi Gadhi Daati"	Srirag Vadlakonda	Krishna Tejasvi	2:30
Total length:				2:30

== Reception ==
Thadhagath Pathi of The Times of India praised the narration and added that "The way Mallik connects a mathematical equation to life is hilarious and relatable. And that’s where all the logic lies!" Pinkvilla gave a rating of 2.5 out of 5. The critic wrote that "While the writing tries to bring out the insecurities of its characters, it doesn't quite rise above stock scenes. A beach date here, a cinema outing there. The treatment is also Gautham Menon-esque in the sense that Kittu is floored by Jasmine's beauty like a typical Menon hero."

Film Companion's Sankeertana Varma cited it as "a teenage romance with all the trappings of the genre, but none of the rewards". Rajitha Chanti of TV9 Telugu called it a "feel good love story".
