= Aavi Kumar =

2015 Indian film by K. Kandeepan

- Directed by: K. Kandeepan
- Written by: Thai Muthu Selvan
- Produced by: Sridhar Narayanan; S. Sivasaravanan
- Starring: Udhaya; Kanika Tiwari; Nassar
- Cinematography: Rajesh K. Narayanan
- Edited by: Anil Malnad
- Music by: Vijay Antony; Srikanth Deva
- Production companies: Action Take Movies; Volmart Films
- Release date: 24 July 2015
- Running time: 122 minutes
- Country: India
- Language: Tamil

Aavi Kumar (transl. Spirit Kumar) is a 2015 Indian Tamil horror comedy film directed by Kandeepan. The film stars Udhaya and Kanika Tiwari in the lead roles while Nassar, Jagan and Manobala among others form an ensemble cast. This movie is an unofficial remake of Mohanlal starrer Vismayathumbathu (2004). Music for the film was composed by Vijay Antony and Srikanth Deva and the film opened to negative reviews in July 2015.

== Cast ==
- Udhaya as Kumar
- Kanika Tiwari as Abhirami
- Nassar as Mahendran
- Jagan as Kumar's friend
- Manobala as Doctor
- M. S. Bhaskar as Kumar's uncle
- Ramdoss as patient
- Devadarshini as patient's wife
- Bava Lakshmanan as broker
- Vijayaganesh
- Hafsal
- Sharfuddin Shah
- Punitha Shanmugam
- Agnes Sounkar
- Madhu Tiwari
- 'Saivam' Vicky
- Varusai Kubendran

== Production ==
Choreographer Chinni Prakash recommended that the team sign on Kanika Tiwari for the lead role, after she had made her acting debut in the Hindi film, Agneepath (2012) as Hrithik Roshan's sister. Vijay Antony was signed on as music composer, and suggested the title for the film. His busy schedules meant that Srikanth Deva was later brought in to finish the film's score and soundtrack. Shooting for the film began in Malaysia during December 2012, with a first loom poster released on the day. The film progressed throughout April 2013, with Udhaya balancing his shoot alongside his commitments as an actor in his brother's film, Thalaivaa (2013). The team shot in Malaysia for 45 days, before returning to Chennai finish portions.

== Soundtrack ==
The music composed by Vijay Antony and Srikanth Deva.

No.	Song	Singers	Lyrics	Music
1	"Idhayam Nagaruthe"	Santhosh, Manasi	Na. Muthukumar	Vijay Antony
2	"Poo Poo Veliye Poo"	Andrea Jeremiah	Na. Muthukumar	Vijay Antony
3	"Vaa Vaa Tamizh Paiyya"	Kavitha	Na. Muthukumar	Srikanth Deva
4	"Vaa Vaa Uyire Vaa"	Vijay Antony	Na. Muthukumar	Vijay Antony

== Release and reception ==
The film opened in July 2015 to mixed reviews from critics. A reviewer from the Deccan Chronicle noted "the plot is new and interesting", while the "film had all the potential to turn out to be an engaging thriller, had the director infused some twists and turns instead of narrating it flat". Likewise, the critic from The Times of India noted "in the right hands, this could have been an engaging mystery that thrilled us with every revelation", but "what we get is a tonally deaf film which goes about narrating the plot points in a bland and clichéd fashion".
