= Mallik Ram =

Indian film director

- Occupations: Film director; writer
- Years active: 2016–present
- Known for: Tillu Square
- Spouse: Lanka Santoshi

Mallik Ram is an Indian film director and writer who works in Telugu cinema. He made his directorial debut in 2016 with romantic comedy film Naruda Donoruda. He went on to direct films such as Tharagathi Gadhi Daati, Adbhutham and Tillu Square.

== Career ==
Ram made his direction debut in 2016 with the film Naruda Donoruda starring Sumanth. In 2021, he directed Tharagathi Gadhi Daati which released in Aha. In the same year he directed Adbhutham, it was premiered on Disney+ Hotstar.

Later, In 2024 Mallik directed Tillu Square which got praises from critics. Vrinda Mundara of Times Now praised "Mallik Ram's direction for maintaining the film's entertainment value through its mix of comedy and romance". Vivek Santhosh of Cinema Express noted that "Mallik Ram's direction effectively built upon the strengths of DJ Tillu, preserving its comedic appeal and energetic storytelling".

His Netflix series Super Subbu starring Sundeep Kishan and Mithila Palkar is released on 2 July 2026.

== Personal life ==
Mallik Ram is married to Lanka Santoshi, a costume designer and stylist who works in the Telugu film industry.

== Filmography ==
Key
†	Denotes films that have not yet been released

=== Films ===
Year	Title	Notes	Ref.
2016	Naruda Donoruda		
2024	Tillu Square		

=== Television ===
Year	Title	Network	Ref.
2017	Pelli Gola	Viu	
2018	Pelli Gola 2	Viu	
2021	Tharagathi Gadhi Daati	Aha	
2021	Adbhutham	Disney+ Hotstar	
2026	Super Subbu	Netflix	
