= Naandhi =

2021 Telugu language crime drama film

- Theatrical release poster
- Directed by: Vijay Kanakamedala
- Screenplay by: Vijay Kanakamedala
- Dialogues by: Abburi Ravi
- Story by: Toom Venkat
- Produced by: Satish Varma
- Starring: Allari Naresh; Varalaxmi Sarathkumar
- Cinematography: Siddharth J.
- Edited by: Chota K. Prasad
- Music by: Sricharan Pakala
- Production company: SV2 Entertainment
- Release date: 19 February 2021
- Running time: 146 minutes
- Country: India
- Language: Telugu
- Budget: ₹6 crore
- Box office: est. ₹9.5 crore

Naandhi (transl. Beginning) is a 2021 Indian Telugu-language legal drama film directed by debutant Vijay Kanakamedala and produced by Satish Varma. The film stars Allari Naresh and Varalaxmi Sarathkumar, while Priyadarshi, Harish Uthaman, Vinay Varma, and Praveen play supporting roles. The film has music composed by Sricharan Pakala with cinematography performed by Siddharth J. The plot follows the life of Surya Prakash (Naresh), an undertrial prisoner who is falsely accused of murder, awaiting judgement.

Released on 19 February 2021, Naandhi opened to highly positive reviews and became a commercial success, grossing over ₹9.5 crore at the box office. A Hindi remake has been announced with Ajay Devgn as the lead under the production of Dil Raju.

== Plot ==
Surya Prakash is an honest software engineer living with his parents. His only aim is to fulfill the dreams of his parents, which they sacrificed for his upbringing. Soon, Surya gets engaged to Meenakshi. Meanwhile, tensions arise in the state after the death of an honest and truthful lawyer Rajagopal. The police are under immense pressure to arrest the murderer. The in-charge of the case, CI Kishore, pulls Surya into the case, arresting him by falsely accusing him of killing Rajagopal. This is after he gets a contract, worth ₹10 lakh, which Surya actually took as a loan, for buying a house. Kishore creates and plants fake evidence.

Surya is astonished as all the people, who can prove his innocence, turn hostile after being threatened by Kishore. Surya becomes an undertrial prisoner, and Kishore tortures him to make him accept the crime, but Surya stands his ground. Surya's parents commit suicide by immolating themselves, which devastates Surya. At the funeral ground of his parents, Kishore reveals to Surya that he forced his parents to commit suicide, in exchange for not torturing Surya in prison. Surya becomes infuriated and beats up Kishore, due to which he is charged with another case. Helpless, Meenakshi leaves Surya and ends their relationship.

After four years, Surya's case is still in court, and he is a broken man. He meets Radha Prakash, a controversial YouTuber, and narrates his past. Later, advocate Aadhya comes forward and succeeds in bailing Surya, but he brutally thrashes up some imprisoned goons, who beat him up without any reason, as per Kishore's plan. Surya again ends up in prison. Radha Prakash is revealed to be Aadhya's brother, and he recorded the incident in which the goons mistreated Surya. The video gets uploaded on the Internet, resulting in a human rights office meeting Surya in prison. Upon Surya's request, his case goes to the Fast Track High Court with Aadhya as his defense lawyer.

Aadhya proves Surya's innocence, and he is acquitted of the accusations. Surya decides to take revenge on Kishore using IPC Section 211. Satyamurthy becomes Kishore's defense lawyer for the case. Surya abducts Chandraiah, Kishore's assistant, who testified against Surya in Rajagopal's murder case. Chandraiah reveals that Kishore bribed two goons to kill Rajagopal, but upon pressure from the opposition party, he decided to capture them. The goons learned of the truth and escaped, which caused Kishore to pull Surya into the case, using a co-incidence as evidence.

Chandraiah accepts to reveal the truth in court, but he is kidnapped by the henchmen of ex-Home Minister Naagender, who is revealed to be the mastermind behind Rajagopal's murder. Aadhya requests the judge to provide them more time, and he accepts. Chandraiah is killed by Kishore, who fakes a report that he died in the riots. Aadhya and Surya find out that Naagender ordered Kishore to kill Rajagopal. Before Rajagopal's death five years ago, Naagender's land scams were brought to light by the government. To divert the media's attention, Naagender got Rajagopal killed because of his popularity and good image in the state.

Aadhya and Surya nearly succeed in exposing Naagender and request permission to tap Naagender's phone calls to prove him guilty. A night before the court appearance, Surya is kidnapped by Naagender, who blackmails Aadhya to withdraw the case, but upon being inspired by Surya, Aadhya carries on with the prosecution. Though injured, Surya successfully frees himself, defeating Naagender's henchmen. He reaches the court, where he is admitted to the hospital and is saved from his injuries. Naagender and Kishore are legally proved guilty, and they receive life imprisonment and death sentence, respectively. After this, Surya is relieved that his parents' death was not in vain.

== Cast ==
- Allari Naresh as Bandi Surya Prakash, a software engineer
  - Aakash Srinivas as Young Surya
- Varalaxmi Sarathkumar as Adv. Aadhya Mullapudi, Surya's defense lawyer
- Harish Uthaman as CI Kishore, a corrupt police officer
- Vinay Varma as Naagender, a corrupt ex-home minister
- Praveen as Santosh, Surya's best friend and helper
- Priyadarshi Pulikonda as Adv. Radha Prakash, Aadhya's brother and a YouTuber
- Srikanth Iyengar as Public Prosecutor Satyamurthy
- C. V. L. Narasimha Rao as Adv. Rajagopal, a social activist
- Navami Gayak as Meenakshi, Surya's ex-fiancée
- Rajyalakshmi as Rajagopal's wife
- Ananda Chakrapani as Meenakshi's father
- Devi Prasad as Surya's father
- Pramodini as Surya's mother
- Mani Chandana as Meenakshi's mother
- Krishneswara Rao as Adv. Chandraiah, Kishore's close confident.

== Production ==
=== Development ===
The film is Vijay Kanakamedala's directorial debut. Allari Naresh, who is known for his comic roles, is cast as an undertrial prisoner. Varalaxmi Sarathkumar is seen as an advocate that helps the falsely convicted victims. Srikanth Iyengar is a crooked lawyer, while Priyadarshi is seen as a controversial YouTuber.

=== Principal photography ===
Principal photography of the film began in January 2020 at Ramanaidu Studios in Hyderabad with the first schedule completed by February 2020. Filming also took place in an Aluminum factory in the city. Nearly 80% of the shoot was completed by June 2020.

== Soundtrack ==
The music is composed by Sricharan Pakala.

Naandhi

Soundtrack album by Sricharan Pakala
- Recorded: 2020–2021
- Studios: Jubilee10 Studios (Hyderabad); St. Luke's Studio (Visakhapatnam)
- Genre: Feature film soundtrack
- Language: Telugu
- Label: Lahari Music
- Producer: Sricharan Pakala

Sricharan Pakala chronology
Maa Vintha Gaadha Vinuma (2020)	Naandhi (2021)	Thimmarusu (2021)

Track listing
No.	Title	Lyrics	Singer(s)	Length
1.	"Cheli" (Backing Vocals: Sricharan Pakala)	Sri Mani	N.C. Karunya, Haripriya Maranganti	3:35
2.	"Idhe Naandhi" (Backing Vocals: Sricharan Pakala, S. Anant Srikar)	Chaitanya Prasad	Vijay Prakash	3:20
3.	"Devathalantha" (Backing Vocals: Sricharan Pakala)	Kittu Vissapragada	Anurag Kulkarni	3:45
4.	"Gundelona"	Chaitanya Prasad	Kareemulla	3:18

== Reception ==
=== Critical reception ===
The Times of India's Thadhagath Pathi rated the film 3.5 out of 5 stars and stated, "A film like this demands excellent writing and that is what Vijay excels at. He tells a story that goes beyond the usual tropes of a man wronged getting a bail and seeking revenge." Sangeetha Devi in her review for The Hindu, wrote "Naandhi marks the arrival of Vijay Kanakamedala as a director with promise and reinforces how good an actor Naresh is. This will go down as one of his career-best performances."

Vishwanath Vijayanagaram of The New Indian Express opined: "Despite being well-intentioned, Naandhi lacks both the consistency of a courtroom drama and the maturity of a legal procedural." Vijayanagaram rated the film 2.5/5 and added, "Composer Sricharan Pakala rises above the mediocre script and deserves kudos for this. Besides Naresh and Varu, Vinay Varma, Harish Uthaman, and Priyadarshi too deliver nice performances."

=== Box office ===
The film grossed ₹6.4 crore in the first week. It is Naresh's first commercially successful film after nearly eight years.

=== Home Release ===
Aha's acquisition of Naandhi led to its premiere on 12 March 2021.

== Awards ==
Date of ceremony	Award	Category	Recipient(s) and nominee(s)	Result	Ref.
10–11 September 2022	10th South Indian International Movie Awards	Best Actor - Telugu	Allari Naresh	Nominated	
10–11 September 2022	10th South Indian International Movie Awards	Best Debut Producer – Telugu	Satish Varma	Won	
10–11 September 2022	10th South Indian International Movie Awards	Best Debut Director - Telugu	Vijay Kanakamedala	Nominated	
21 October 2022	Sakshi Excellence Awards 2021	Special Recognition Award	Satish Varma; Vijay Kanakamedala	Won	
