= Vellaiya Irukiravan Poi Solla Maatan =

2015 Indian film by A. L. Abanindran

- Poster
- Directed by: A. L. Abanindran
- Written by: A. L. Abanindran
- Produced by: Devanshu Arya; Vachan Shetty; Ravi Varman
- Starring: Praveen Kumar; Sanam Shetty; Shalini Vadnikatti
- Cinematography: Sarangarajan
- Edited by: Anthony
- Music by: Joshua Sridhar; Timothy Madhukar
- Production company: Ignite Films
- Distributed by: Kalaipuli International
- Release date: 24 December 2015
- Running time: 127 minutes
- Country: India
- Language: Tamil

Vellaiya Irukiravan Poi Solla Maatan (transl. A white man never lies) is a 2015 Tamil language comedy film written and directed by newcomer A. L. Abanindran. The film features an ensemble cast of Praveen Kumar, Sanam Shetty, Shalini Vadnikatti, Bala Saravanan, Aruldoss, Jayaprakash, Karthik Kumar, and Aadukalam Naren. The film released on 24 December 2015.

== Plot ==
Karthik is an IT professional in dire need of money for his father Ramalingam's cancer treatment. Finding no other way, he resorts to blackmail as a means of acquiring the necessary funds. It eventually leads him all the way to blackmailing a prominent politician.

== Cast ==
- Praveen Kumar as Karthik
- Sanam Shetty as Aruna
- Shalini Vadnikatti as Pooja
- Karthik Kumar as Dr. Raghu
- Bala Saravanan as Mani
- Jayaprakash as Ramalingam, Karthik's father
- Aadukalam Naren as Periyavar
- Aruldoss as Rajagopal
- T. M. Karthik as Sharma
- Five Star Krishna as Varma
- M. J. Shriram as Pradeep Kumar IAS
- K. S. G. Venkatesh as Lawyer Krishnamoorthy
- Poo Ramu as Pandian
- Supergood Subramani as Selvarathnam
- Natarajan (Nat Narayanasamy) as Periyavar's advisor
- Gnanavel as Shanmugam
- Pazhani as Thiruvengadam
- Ilankainathan as Gnanam
- Raja Rishi as Subbaiah
- Aroul D. Shankar as Prakash

== Production ==
The project was announced by Devanshu Arya of Ignite Films and director Abanindran in late 2014, and marked the director's feature film debut after he and Devanshu Arya had previously assisted during the making of Rajiv Menon's Minsara Kanavu (1997) and Kandukondain Kandukondain (2000). The film stars newcomer Praveen Kumar, who played a supporting role in Kalyana Samayal Saadham (2013) in the lead role alongside Shalini Vadnikatti, a model from Hyderabad. Abanindran had worked with Praveen Kumar and the producers, Ignite Films, before, when the trio worked on the television serial, Dharmayutham for Vijay TV during 2012. Cinematographer Ravi Varman also worked as a co-producer for the film, marking his maiden production. The ensemble cast was also revealed to feature Sanam Shetty, Karthik Kumar, Aadukalam Naren, Jayaprakash and Bala Saravanan, while Anthony was announced as the film's editor. The film was named after a dialogue spoken by Vadivelu in the film Aarya (2007).

The team shot the film around Chennai in forty days. After the film was completed, S. Thanu of Kalaipuli International bought the film's worldwide distribution rights.

== Soundtrack ==
Soundtrack was composed by Joshua Sridhar.

- "Gappu La Aappu" - Santhosh Hariharan
- "Nizhala Nijama" - Saicharan

== Release ==
The film released to mixed reviews in December 2015, having been delayed for three weeks as a result of the 2015 South Indian floods. A critic from The New Indian Express noted that "it was an impressive debut". The Times of India wrote "There is a wonderful screwball vibe to Vellaiya Irukiravan Poi Solla Maatan (VIPSM), a black comedy that is a confident debut by Abanindran. The director manages to keep things relatable and even when things get out of hand for the hapless protagonist, they do not feel improbable."
