= Boy Meets Girl (Tholiprema Katha) =

2014 Telugu movie

- Official poster
- Directed by: Vasanth Dayakar
- Written by: Vasanth Dayakar
- Starring: Siddhu Jonnalagadda; Nikhita Anil; Kanika Tiwari
- Cinematography: Durga Kishore
- Music by: Songs: Gururaja; Vasanth Dayakar; Sriram Tapaswi; Score: Gururaja
- Release date: 28 March 2014
- Country: India
- Language: Telugu

Boy Meets Girl (Tholiprema Katha) is a 2014 Indian Telugu-language romantic comedy film directed by Vasanth Dayakar and starring Siddharth Jonnalagadda, Nikhita Anil (in her Telugu debut) and Kanika Tiwari.

The film was released on 28 March 2014 around the time of Ugadi and was a box office failure.

== Cast ==
- Siddhu Jonnalagadda as Siddhu
- Nikhita Anil as Maha Lakshmi
- Kanika Tiwari as Mahalakshmi
- Vennela Kishore
- Praveen as RJ Bobby Bokkala
- Chanti
- Surya
- Madhumani
- Harish
- Shankar as Rambabu

== Production ==
Vasanth Dayakar, who previously worked for Bommarillu Bhaskar and Srikanth Addala, made his directorial debut with this film. Malayali actress Nikhita Anil made her Telugu debut with this film.

== Reception ==
A critic from The Times of India wrote that "Director Vasanth Dayakar handles the subject well though the comedy sometimes goes haywire. The artistes live their roles, thanks also to the cinematography".
