= Ooops a Desi =

2013 film by Jenner Jose

- Directed by: Jenner Jose
- Screenplay by: Jenner
- Story by: Jenner Jose
- Produced by: Jenner Entertainment
- Starring: Buali Shah; Adnan Khalid; Pragathi Yadhati; Gideon Samson; Anil Sachdeva; Manohar Pinnamraju; Siddharth Gupta; Javed Khalid; Sonia Gadhok
- Cinematography: Sri Ponnapati
- Edited by: Jenner Jose
- Production company: Jenner Entertainment LLC
- Distributed by: Artistic Crab Entertainment
- Release date: 23 August 2013
- Running time: 2 hours
- Countries: India, USA
- Languages: Hindi; English

Ooops a Desi is a 2013 Hindi fast-paced drama thriller film directed by Jenner Jose. The film premiered at Times Square (US) followed by theatrical release on 23 August 2013 at major multiplexes across India. Movie received a very positive critical reception. The lack of marketing was its drawback. The film features Buali Shah, Pragathi Yadhati, Adnan Khalid and Gideon Samson as main characters.

== Box office ==
The film opened to very good response in many metro multiplex theatres (limited release) and collected Rs. 4.2 crores on its first weekend and the total box office collections was 32 crores. The movie was made on a very small minimal budget with very limited crew, so it was in the profit territory by the first weekend itself.

== Synopsis ==
Ooops a Desi is about Indians (Desi) living in the US on an invalid immigration status. The movie opens to a busy downtown street in New York City. The passing pedestrians notice something very alarming. It's a Desi (Indian) holding a sign, which states "BOMB here!!!". The narrative shifts to the story that occurred before this incident. Xavier, the man with the bomb sign, and Dev do odd jobs because of their illegal immigration status. They have their own troubled past that is preventing them from returning to India. The roller-coaster begins when AJ, their roommate, is mysteriously abducted to which Sonia is a witness. Because of their illegal status, Dev and Xavier along with Sonia have no option but to take matters in their own hands.

== Cast ==
- Buali Shah as Xavier
- Adnan Khalid as Dev
- Pragathi Yadhati as Sonia
- Gideon Samson as AJ
- Anil Sachdeva as Bhushan
- Manohar Pinnamraju as Swami
- Siddhartha Gupta as Nilesh
- Javed Khalid as Patiala
- Sonia Gadhok as Aarthi
- Srikanth Reddy Ponnapati (Sri ponnapati)
- Michael J. Citak as Gangster
- A.J. Rosen as Photographer

== Music ==
- Music Directors: Gugy, Gaurav H. Singh, Hardik Dave, Divyajeet Sahoo, Saurabh Malhotra, Bharat Hans, Deepak Agrawal
- Singers: Gufy, Hardik Dave, Bharat Hans, Suryaveer Hooja
- Lyrics: Deepak Agrawal, Leeladhar Dhote, Divyajeet Sahoo, Gaurav H. Singh, Hardik Dave
