= 28 Degree Celsius =

2025 Indian Telugu-language film by Anil Viswanath

- Theatrical release poster
- Directed by: Anil Vishwanath
- Written by: Anil Vishwanath
- Produced by: Sai Abhishek
- Starring: Naveen Chandra; Shalini Vadnikatti
- Cinematography: Vamsi Patchipulusu
- Edited by: Garry BH
- Music by: Score: Sricharan Pakala; Songs: Shravan Bharadwaj
- Production companies: Veeranjaneya Productions; Riverside Cinemas
- Release date: 4 April 2025
- Running time: 119 minutes
- Country: India
- Language: Telugu

28 Degree Celsius is a 2025 Indian Telugu-language romantic thriller film written and directed by Anil Vishwanath. The film features Naveen Chandra and Shalini Vadnikatti in lead roles.

The film was released on 4 April 2025.

== Plot ==
28 Degree Celsius follows the heartfelt story of Anjali, a bright and compassionate young medical student who falls deeply in love with Karthik. As the two tie the knot and embark on their journey together, life takes a devastating turn.

Shortly after their marriage, Anjali is diagnosed with a rare and life-threatening illness. Her only hope lies in a specialised treatment available in Georgia. Her husband, Karthik does everything in his power to get her the care she needs, accompanying her overseas. After a brain injury, Anjali is dependent on maintaining exactly 28 °C body temperature.

Sadly, Anjali dies unexpectedly, leaving Karthik heartbroken and full of unanswered questions.

Crushed by Anjali's death, Karthik senses that something is not right. As he refuses to accept the official explanation of her death, he begins a quest for the truth. What begins as a search for closure soon unravels a tangle of dark secrets, hidden motives, and dangerous people who do not want the truth revealed.

As Karthik digs deeper, shocking revelations come to light, forcing him to confront painful realities and powerful enemies.

== Cast ==
- Naveen Chandra as Dr. Karthik
- Shalini Vadnikatti as Dr. Anjali Karthik
- Deviyani Sharma as Geetha
- Priyadarshi Pulikonda as Karthik's friend
- Harsha Chemudu as Dr. Harsha
- Chalapathi Raju as Anjali's father
- Abhay Betiganti as goon
- Ajay Kumar
- Santhoshini Sharma as Karthik's colleague
- Sirisha
- Raj Deep Nayak
- Neeraj
- Nitish Pande
- Prasanna Kumar
- Jayaprakash as Dr. Subramanyam, a doctor and professor at Andhra University
- Raja Ravindra as CBI Officer

== Production ==
The film began production in 2019 and shooting was completed later that year. The film's release was stalled due to COVID-19 pandemic.

== Soundtrack ==
All lyrics are written by Kittu Vissapragada; all music is composed by Shravan Bharadwaj.

| No. | Title | Singer(s) | Length |
|---|---|---|---|
| 1. | "Theeru Maaruthondhe" | Anurag Kulkarni | 4:07 |
| 2. | "Gnapakame" | Kaala Bhairava | 4:01 |
| 3. | "Cheliya Cheliya" | L. V. Revanth | 4:26 |

== Release and reception ==
28 Degree Celsius was released on 4 April 2025.

Sakshi also gave the same rating and a mixed review. Asianet Telugu gave a rating of 2.25 out of 5.
