= Krishna and His Leela =

2020 film by Ravikanth Perepu

- Official poster
- Directed by: Ravikanth Perepu
- Written by: Ravikanth Perepu; Siddhu Jonnalagadda
- Produced by: Sanjay Reddy; Rana Daggubati (presenter)
- Starring: Siddhu Jonnalagadda; Shraddha Srinath; Seerat Kapoor; Shalini Vadnikatti
- Cinematography: Shaneil Deo; Sai Prakash Ummadisingu
- Edited by: Garry BH; Ravikanth Perepu; Siddhu Jonnalagadda
- Music by: Sricharan Pakala
- Production companies: Suresh Productions; Viacom18 Studios
- Distributed by: Netflix
- Release dates: June 25, 2020 (OTT); February 14, 2025 (Theatrical)
- Running time: 147 minutes
- Country: India
- Language: Telugu

Krishna and His Leela (also known as Its Complicated), is a 2020 Indian Telugu-language romantic comedy film directed by Ravikanth Perepu who co-wrote and co-edited the film with Siddhu Jonnalagadda. The film is produced by Suresh Productions and Viacom18 Studios. It stars Siddhu Jonnalagadda, Shraddha Srinath, Seerat Kapoor and Shalini Vadnikatti. This is Perepu's second film after Kshanam (2016). The music was composed by Sricharan Pakala. The film was released over Netflix on 25 June 2020. The film is scheduled for a wide theatrical release on February 14, 2025.

== Plot ==
In Vizag, Sathya breaks up with Krishna and moves to Bangalore. After going through a phase of depression, Krishna decides to move on and meets Radha, and they begin dating. Krishna receives a job offer in an IT firm in Bangalore, and leaves after deciding to maintain a long-distance relationship with Radha.

In Bangalore, Krishna meets his sister Arya's roommate Rukhsar, and forms a close friendship with her. He also meets and reconnects with Sathya, and tells Radha about his friendship with Sathya. Radha arrives in Bangalore a fortnight later, and they all take a vacation to Coorg. After returning to Bangalore, Radha leaves back to Vizag. Over the next few weeks Krishna and Sathya get closer, and the former begins to drift apart from Radha. This leads to their eventual breakup. One night, while spending the night with Sathya, Krishna ends up having sex with her, and they reconcile, starting a relationship again.

However, Radha returns to Bangalore, telling Krishna she became pregnant after their trip to Coorg, but was able to take contraceptives in time. A guilt-ridden Krishna lies to Radha that he is not in touch with Sathya, and reconciles with her, simultaneously dating the two girls. Arya's marriage is fixed, and despite Krishna's reluctance, their estranged father is invited to the wedding. During the wedding, Krishna struggles to manage Sathya and Radha, fabricating several lies, and his plight is understood by his father. The latter advices Krishna to be practical and make a choice between the two girls, a mistake he himself had committed during Krishna's childhood. Krishna pays heed to the advice and confesses to the two girls that he has been cheating on them, and they both leave him.

On Rukhsar's advice, Krishna takes a road-trip and writes a book about his misadventures with Sathya and Radha, and publishes the book under the title Krishna and His Leela. The book is a success, and during a meet and greet, reveals that he maintains a good friendship with the two girls, Radha having settled abroad and Sathya getting married the following month. At an after-party following the marriage, Krishna approaches Rukhsar and asks her to marry him, to which she looks back in shock with a slight smile.

== Cast ==
- Siddhu Jonnalagadda as Krishna
- Shraddha Srinath as Sathya Rao
- Seerat Kapoor as Rukhsar
- Shalini Vadnikatti as Radha Panicker
- Viva Harsha as Harsha, Krishna's friend
- Jhansi as Geetha, Krishna's mother
- Sampath Raj as Krishna's father
- Samyukta Hornad as Arya, Krishna's sister
- Raj Madiraju as Radha's father
- Poojan Kohli as Poojan
- Sricharan Pakala as Krishna's friend
- Sandeep Raj as Reporter
- Eugeni Austinova as Harsha's girlfriend

== Production ==
In March 2017, Rana Daggubati was reported to collaborate with Ravikanth Perepu (of Kshanam fame), by presenting his upcoming project. Rana decided to present the project after Perepu narrated the script to the former and got impressed with the storyline, although the details were undeciphered. In May 2017, it was reported that Shraddha Srinath and Seerat Kapoor will play the female leads, opposite Siddhu Jonnalagada (of Guntur Talkies fame) as the protagonist. While no details were revealed about the project, in August 2019, the makers announced the film's title as Krishna and His Leela, and the makers also wrapped the shoot in Kashmir.

== Soundtrack ==
Krishna and His Leela

Soundtrack album by Sricharan Pakala
- Released: 6 July 2020
- Genre: Feature film soundtrack
- Length: 18:46
- Language: Telugu
- Label: Suresh Productions
- Producer: Sricharan Pakala

Sricharan Pakala chronology
| Aswathama (2020) | Krishna and His Leela (2020) | Gatham (2020) |

The music is composed by Sricharan Pakala with lyrics written by Pakala, Kittu Vissapragada, Pranav Chaganty, Rohit Roe Pediredla, Murtuza Abbas Qurasani, Ananth Srikar and Vedala Hemachandra.

Tracklist
| No. | Title | Lyrics | Singer(s) | Length |
|---|---|---|---|---|
| 1. | "Ekanthamantha" | Kittu Vissapragada | Ravikanth Perepu | 3:03 |
| 2. | "Endhukura" | Sricharan Pakala, Pranav Chaganty, Rohit Roe Pediredla | Sricharan Pakala, Pranav Chaganty, Rohit Roe Pediredla | 3:25 |
| 3. | "Met You Once" | Murtuza Abbas Qurasani | Sricharan Pakala | 3:34 |
| 4. | "Nayanam" | Ananth Srikar | Poojan Kohli, Veena Ghantasala | 3:40 |
| 5. | "Pulihora" | Vedala Hemachandra | Vedala Hemachandra | 2:48 |
| 6. | "Muddugare" | Sricharan Pakala | Veena Ghantasala | 2:15 |
| Total length: | | | | 18:46 |

== Release ==
Krishna and His Leela was scheduled for a theatrical release on 1 May 2020, but due to the COVID-19 pandemic the makers opted for a direct digital release on Netflix, from 25 June 2020 and later released on Aha from 4 July 2020.

== Reception ==
Baradwaj Rangan of Film Companion South wrote "Krishna And His Leela never rises above “casual” and “breezy”: it doesn't sting. But that's not really a deal-breaker. But What's interesting in these “new-gen” movies — especially in the context of Telugu cinema — is how interestingly, how consistently the women are written". Sangeetha Devi Dundoo of The Hindu reviewed "The film navigates tricky corners of confused relationships with humour". Shubhra Gupta of The Indian Express gave two-and-a-half out of five and wrote "There’s a thin line between comedy and drama and you’re walking on that line now, says a character to another. The film manages to walk that line, wobbling occasionally but straightening out in time".

Haricharan Pudipeddi of Hindustan Times stated "Even though it starts out as a slightly cheesy take on modern romance, it takes a refreshing turn as the story progresses, quite boldly crushing many mainstream stereotypes associated with the representation of love and marriage. For its unadulterated, unabashed take on urban romance, the film deserves a lot of praise and love". Janani K. of India Today gave three-and-a-half out of five, saying "Krishna and his Leela is a film that showcases the life of youngsters and their stability when it comes to relationships". Sowmya Rajendran of The News Minute gave three stars and wrote "The film more or less follows the pattern of movies with philandering heroes but with some refreshing departures [...] What the film does best is to explore contemporary relationships, with independent partners who have ambitions of their own and things are more fluid and flexible than they were a generation ago. The music, styling, and the camera, focusing closely on the characters' subtle expressions and the unfolding drama, offer an urban experience on screen that's rarely witnessed".

Sify gave two-and-a-half out of five stating "‘Krishna and His Leela’ is contemporary rom-com of a confused youngster but this film is more like adding coolness to ‘cheating’ in relationships". Sudhir Srinivasan of The New Indian Express wrote "Krishna and His Leela is a film whose characters and situations bring out enough complexity without its lead character having to look into the camera and ask why it’s wrong to be in love with two women at the same time."
