= Rangan Style =

2014 Indian Kannada romantic comedy drama film

- Directed by: Prashanth S
- Written by: Prashanth S Manju Mandavya
- Produced by: Orange Brothers
- Starring: Pradeep; Kannika Tiwari
- Cinematography: cini technology Soori
- Edited by: P.R Soundharraj
- Music by: Gurukiran
- Release date: 21 March 2014
- Country: India
- Language: Kannada
- Box office: ₹5.2 crore (US$540,000)

Rangan Style is a 2014 Indian Kannada-language romantic comedy drama film written and directed by Prashanth S starring Pradeep and Kanika Tiwari in the lead roles. This film also starring Sudeepa in an important guest role and also starring Rekha Das, Sadhu Kokila, Gurukiran, Sharath Lohitashwa, Tabla Nani and others. Film produced by Orange brothers under the banner Orange cinemas.

== Cast ==
- Pradeep Bogadi as Ranga (lead)
- Kanika Tiwari as Divya
- Sudeepa as Police Officer (Cameo)
- Bharti Singh (Cameo)
- Rekha Das
- Sadhu Kokila
- Sharath Lohitashwa
- Gurukiran
- Sachin Shetty
- Tabla Nani

== Soundtrack ==
Music composed by Gurukiran for all songs. lyrics by Gurukiran, Kaviraj, Ravi, and others

No.	Title	Singer(s)	Length
1.	"Ganganam Style"	Malgudi Subha, Gurukiran	4:31
2.	"Punaha Punaha"	Shreya Ghoshal, Shaan	3:56
3.	"Hudugi Beku"	Gurukiran	3:49
4.	"Khanditha Ninna"	Hariharan	4:07
5.	"Moda Tumbiruvaga" (Male)	Shriram Iyer	5:03
6.	"Moda Tumbiruvaga" (Female)	Nanditha	5:03

== Reception ==
=== Critical response ===
Sify wrote "Music by Gurukiran is praise worthy and feels like Guru is back, while the dialogues written by Manju Mandavya and cinematography by Cine Tech Soori are commendable". Y Maheswara Reddy of DNA scored the film at 3 out of 5 stars and wrote that "The stunt and chase sequences in the film are a drag. Also, some of the dialogues in the film come across as offensive. The film is worth a watch for the message it holds". A Sharadhaa of The New Indian Express wrote "Except for one peppy number, the songs composed by Gurukiran weigh the movie down. Prashanth has attempted to bring in a new twist to the same old love story but has ended up producing a rather boring flick".
