= Kanika Tiwari =

Indian actress

- Born: 8 April 1998 (age 28); Bhopal, Madhya Pradesh, India
- Occupations: Actress; Model

Kanika Tiwari (born 8 April 1998) is an Indian actress from Madhya Pradesh. She debuted into Bollywood with Agneepath (2012). She has acted as female lead in Telugu film Boy Meets Girl (2014), Kannada film Rangan Style (2014), and Tamil film Aavi Kumar (2015). She is a cousin of TV actress Divyanka Tripathi.

== Filmography ==
Year	Title	Role	Notes
2012	Agneepath	Shiksha Chauhan	Hindi
2014	Rangan Style	Divya	Kannada
2014	Boy Meets Girl (Tholiprema Katha)	Mahalakshmi	Telugu
2015	Aavi Kumar	Abhirami	Tamil

== See also ==
- Zoya Afroz
