= Shambhala (2025 film) =

2025 Indian Telugu film by Ugandhar Muni

Aadi Shambhala
- Theatrical release poster
- Directed by: Ugandhar Muni
- Written by: Ugandhar Muni
- Produced by: Mahidhar Reddy; Rajashekhar Annabhimoju
- Starring: Aadi Saikumar; Archana Iyer; Swasika Vijay
- Cinematography: Praveen K. Bangarri
- Edited by: Shravan Katikaneni
- Music by: Sricharan Pakala
- Production company: Shining Pictures Banner
- Release date: 25 December 2025
- Running time: 144 mins
- Country: India
- Language: Telugu
- Budget: ₹13 crore

Aadi Shambhala: A Mystical World is a 2025 Indian Telugu-language supernatural horror thriller film written and directed by Ugandhar Muni. It starred Aadi Saikumar and Archana Iyer.

The film has music composed by Sricharan Pakala, cinematography by Praveen K. Bangarri, and editing by Shravan Katikaneni. The film was released on 25 December 2025 and became a comeback hit for Aadi, after a streak of consecutive box office failures, ultimately grossing over ₹21.05 crore at the box office.

== Plot ==
In the 1980s, a meteorite crashes near Shambhala, a village steeped in history and folklore. From that moment, disturbing incidents begin to plague the village. A scientist, Vikram, arrives to study the situation.

Some villagers behave in a very weird way. They start hurting themselves. And many even kill themselves in violent ways. The villagers, who are full of superstitions, think that something evil has come. But Vikram, who only believes in science, does not believe any of that, and wants to find the truth.

When Vikram investigates the meteorite a secret is revealed. What is the secret? What is the history of Shambhala? What is the story behind the deity of Shambhala? Who is Devi, who helped Vikram in his investigation? What is the reason behind the strange deaths happening in the village?

== Cast ==
- Aadi Saikumar as Vikram, a scientist from Geological survey of India
- Archana Iyer as Devi
- Swasika as Vasantha
- Madhunandan as Police Constable Hanumanthu
- Ravi Varma as Ramulu, a villager
- Ramaraju as Priest
- Shiju AR as Village President
- Harsha Vardhan as Forensic Pathologist
- Annapurna as mother of Ramulu
- Laxman Meesala
- Indraneil Varma
- Praveen as cab driver
- Mamilla Shailaja Priya as Village president's wife

== Music ==
The film's music was composed by Sricharan Pakala.

All tracks are written by Kittu Vissapragada.

No.	Title	Singer(s)...	Length
1.	"Padhe Padhe"	Yamini Ghantasala	3:24
2.	"Naa Peru Shambhala"	Geetha Madhuri	3:30
3.	"Yeppudo Yekkado"	Prudhvi Chandra	3:01
4.	"Shivam Shiva"	Karthik, Sriram Maddury	3:19
Total length:			13:14

== Release ==
Aadi Shambhala was released on 25 December 2025. On 5 January 2026 Rishabh Shetty unveiled the trailer of the Hindi dubbed version of Aadi Shambhala, confirming 9 January 2026 as the release date for the Hindi dubbed version. After a successful theatrical run of the original Telugu version, the film is released in Hindi in theaters.

== Reception ==
Suhas Sistu from The Hans India gave 3.5/5 stars and stated, "Aadi Shambhala stands out as a rare attempt in Telugu cinema that blends mythology, mystery, and horror into a gripping narrative." About the technicalities, he stated, "Director Ugandhar Muni deserves praise for crafting a layered story without confusion. He delivers a genre-driven experience that keeps audiences hooked from the opening frame." Suresh Kavirayani from Cinema Express gave the film 3/5 stars and stated, "For Aadi Saikumar, the film marks a solid comeback, proving that he still has it in him." Bhargav Chaganti from NTV gave the film 3/5 stars and stated, "Although the film feels like it lags here and there, the director has mostly succeeded in giving a good experience to the audience overall."

Avad Mohammad from OTTPlay gave a positive review and stated, "Sricharan Pakala has composed the music for the film, and he elevates the proceedings with an impressive score. The production values are top-notch, as the period setup is handled well." Srivathsan Nadadhur from The Hindu gives the film a mixed review and states, "...Aadi Shambhala works best when it portrays divinity as a quality of those who mean well, and the victims of the evil spirit as people who fail to keep their vices — greed, envy, anger, hatred — in check. Though it lacks novelty, there is minimal fluff, little distraction, and the storytelling remains largely grounded."
