= Sricharan Pakala =

Indian music composer

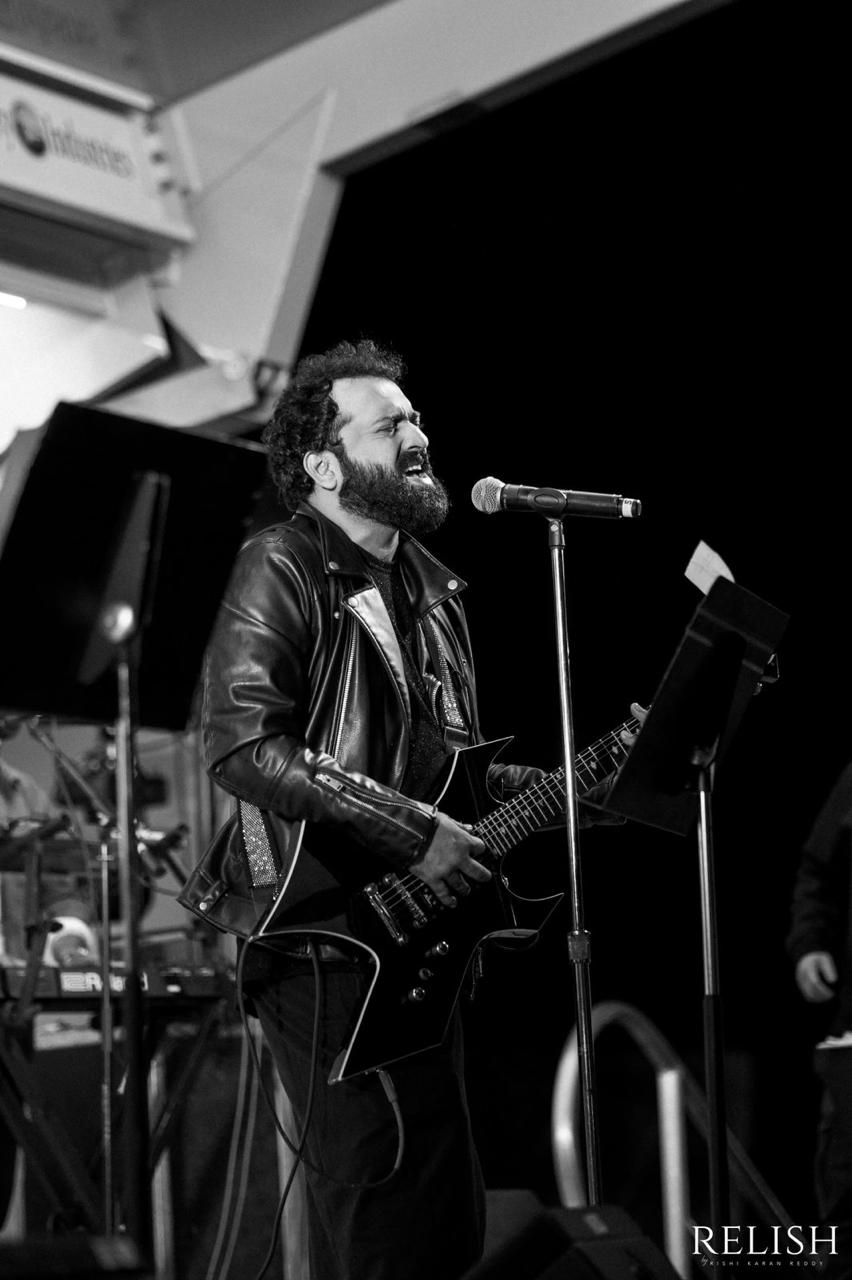

Background information
- Born: 14 May 1987 (age 39); Visakhapatnam, Andhra Pradesh, India
- Genres: Film score, Soundtrack, Electronic, Orchestral
- Occupations: Film composer, Music producer, Playback singer, Instrumentalist
- Instruments: Drums, guitar, keyboard
- Years active: 2013 - Present

Sricharan Pakala is an Indian Music composer, music producer, playback singer and instrumentalist primarily associated with Telugu cinema.

== Early life and career ==
Born in Visakhapatnam, Andhra Pradesh, SriCharan Pakala made his debut as a music director with the romantic comedy Kiss. He gained wider recognition through his work in critically acclaimed films such as Kshanam, Guntur Talkies, Goodachari, Evaru, Krishna and His Leela, Naandhi, Major, DJ Tillu, Bhairavam and Shambhala. His background scores, particularly in thriller and espionage dramas, have been praised for enhancing narrative tension and emotional depth.

Over the course of his career, SriCharan has collaborated with several leading filmmakers and production houses, contributing to films across multiple genres including action thrillers, romantic dramas, crime investigations and commercial entertainers. His work in films such as Goodachari and Major established him as a sought-after composer for high-concept and genre-driven cinema. Over the course of his career, he has composed music for more than 50 projects, establishing himself as a prominent voice in contemporary Telugu cinema.

Apart from composing film scores and soundtracks, Pakala has also worked as a playback singer and performer. His music is noted for its modern production techniques, thematic motifs, and ability to balance commercial appeal with storytelling requirements.

As of 2026, SriCharan Pakala remains one of the most active composers in Telugu cinema, with a filmography spanning theatrical releases, streaming originals and television productions.

== Discography ==
Key
†	Denotes films that have not yet been released

=== As composer ===
==== Score and soundtrack ====
Year	Film	Notes	Ref.
2013	Kiss		
2016	Kshanam		
2016	Guntur Talkies		
2016	Naruda Donoruda		
2017	Lanka		
2017	PSV Garuda Vega		
2018	Rangula Ratnam		
2018	Humble Politician Nograj	Kannada film	
2018	Pelli Gola 2	Television series	
2018	Goodachari		
2018	Ee Office Lo	Television series	
2018	Idam Jagath		
2019	Jessie		
2019	Evaru		
2019	Chanakya		
2019	Operation Gold Fish		
2020	Aswathama		
2020	Krishna and His Leela		
2020	Gatham		
2020	Maa Vintha Gadha Vinuma		
2021	Naandhi		
2021	Thimmarusu: Assignment Vali		
2022	Humble Politiciann Nograj	Kannada TV show, "Scam Raja" song	
2022	DJ Tillu	Nominated–SIIMA Award for Best Music Director – Telugu	
2022	Major	also shot in Hindi	
2022	Itlu Maredumilli Prajaneekam		
2022–2023	Jhansi	Television series	
2023	Ugram		
2023	Spy		
2023	Yadha Yadha Hi	Kannada film	
2023	The Great Indian Suicide		
2023	Vidhi		
2023	Atharva		
2023	Bubblegum		
2024	Bhoothaddam Bhaskar Narayana		
2024	Tillu Square		
2024	Sundaram Master		
2024	Satyabhama		
2024	Bahumukham		
2025	28 Degree Celsius	Background score only	
2025	Bhairavam		
2025	Shambhala		
2026	Cheekatilo		

=== As a singer ===
==== Film songs ====
Year	Film	Song
2016	Kshanam	"Edo Laga Undhi"
2018	Goodachari	"Sakhiya"
2025	Bhairavam	"Theme of Gajapathi"

==== Singles (Non-film) ====
Year	Single	Co-Artist(s)	Ref.
2021	"Ladi Ladi"	Priya Prakash Varrier (co-singer), Rahul Sipligunj (composer)	
