= Maa Vintha Gaadha Vinuma =

2020 film directed by Aditya Mandala

- Film poster
- Directed by: Aditya Mandala
- Written by: Siddhu Jonnalagadda
- Produced by: Sanjay Reddy; Anil Pallala; G. Sunitha; Kirthi Chilukuri
- Starring: Siddhu Jonnalagadda; Seerat Kapoor
- Cinematography: Sai Prakash Ummadisingu
- Edited by: Vamsi Atluri; Siddhu Jonnalagadda
- Music by: Joy; Sricharan Pakala; Rohit
- Production company: Silly Monks Studios
- Distributed by: Aha
- Release date: 13 November 2020
- Country: India
- Language: Telugu

Maa Vintha Gaadha Vinuma (transl. Listen to our strange saga) is a 2020 Indian Telugu-language romantic drama film directed by Aditya Mandala from a screenplay written by Siddhu Jonnalagadda. The film stars Jonnalagadda and Seerat Kapoor while Tanikella Bharani, Shishir Sharma, and Kamal Kamaraju play supporting roles with the music composed by Sricharan Pakala–Rohit–Joy. The film premiered on Aha on 13 November 2020.

== Plot ==
All hell breaks loose when a marriage video of Siddhu and Vineetha goes viral on social media. With chaos and embarrassment in both the families, the couple must sort out all the unpleasant consequences.

== Cast ==
- Siddhu Jonnalagadda as Siddhu
- Seerat Kapoor as Vinitha Venugopal
- Tanikella Bharani as Police Officer
- Kalpika Ganesh as Meghana
- Jayaprakash as Vinitha's father
- Sunitha Tati as Vinitha's mother
- Shishir Sharma as Siddhu's father
- Rajashree as Siddhu's mother
- Kamal Kamaraju as Karthik Venugopal
- Fish Venkat as himself
- Pragathi as Meghana's mother
- Viva Harsha as College Senior
- C. V. L. Narasimha Rao
- Lakshmi Manchu as herself (cameo appearance)

== Production ==
After working in Krishna and His Leela, Siddhu Jonnalagadda and Seerat Kapoor were cast in this film. Kapoor's plays the main character in the film, which is about a couple who attempts to convince their parents to accept their relationship. The post-production of the film was finished in September 2020.

== Soundtracks ==
No.	Title	Lyrics	Music	Singer(s)	Length
1.	"Jaana"	Siddu Jonnalagadda, Aditya Mandala	Ravi Sharma	Ayaan	4:31
2.	"Dooramuga"	Kittu Vissapragada	Sricharan Pakala	Sahithi Chaganti, Poojan Kohli	3:31
3.	"Shayar-E-Ishq"	Siddu Jonnalagadda	Joy Rayarala	Siddu Jonnalagadda	2:35
Total length:					11:00

== Reception ==
Jahnavi Reddy of The News Minute rated the film 2.5 out of 5 and called the film "A refurbished version of a coming-of-age romcom". Reddy added that "Although it is funny in parts, and feels very contemporary in a lot of ways, the film is after all, the story of a man-child, and feels like old wine in a new bottle". The Hindu's Sangeetha Devi Dundoo wrote that "Maa Vintha… has these small moments of appreciable writing but in the larger picture, is neither entertaining nor does it make us empathise with the couple." The Times of India rated the film 3 out of 5 and termed the film "a fresh and funny love story".

A reviewer from Andhra Jyothi rated the film 2/5 and stated that "Director Aditya failed miserably to deliver the content emotionally".
