= Adbhutham =

2021 Indian science fiction romance film

- Official release poster
- Directed by: Mallik Ram
- Screenplay by: Lakshmi Bhupala
- Story by: Prasanth Varma
- Produced by: Mogulla Chandrashekhar Reddy; Srujan Yarabolu
- Starring: Teja Sajja; Shivani Rajashekar
- Cinematography: Vidya Sagar Chinta
- Edited by: Garry BH
- Music by: Radhan
- Production companies: Mahaateja Creations; S Originals
- Distributed by: Disney+ Hotstar
- Release date: 19 November 2021
- Running time: 142 minutes
- Country: India
- Language: Telugu

Adbhutham (transl. Wonder) is a 2021 Indian Telugu-language science fiction romance film directed by Mallik Ram from the screenplay of Lakshmi Bhupala with a story by Prasanth Varma. The film stars Teja Sajja and Shivani Rajashekar. It was premiered on Disney+ Hotstar on November 19, 2021. The film received mixed reviews. This movie was inspired from the 2015 Kannada movie 'Minchagi Neenu Baralu' which itself is inspired from the 2000 South Korean film Il Mare.

== Plot ==
Surya and Vennela are standing on top of an office building and near a lake, respectively, both wanting to commit suicide.

12 hours earlier, Surya wakes up in a dream about a car accident and answers his friend's call, asking him to reach the office early because he is late for a music director interview that his friend is hosting. He gets an unknown call, which he disconnects, and also gets food from an unknown person. He receives a call from someone asking him to participate in a competition. However, he gets lost in his thoughts about his father and is about to meet with an accident, but nothing happens. During the interview, Surya insults the music director and gets insulted by his manager, who happens to be his father's friend. The manager says that his being adamant about music was the primary reason behind his father's death.

Meanwhile, at Vennela's house, the groom and his family have come to see her. She tries to cancel the arranged marriage to follow her dreams, but the groom still wants to marry her. Her father also wants her to get married because she has been unable to clear her entrance exam for the past two years. She assures her father that she will pass the entrance test this time. It turns out that she has failed the mock test. For these reasons, each of them wants to commit suicide.

Surya decides to message someone that he is going to commit suicide. Confused about whom to message, he messages himself. Vennela receives the message and starts arguing that the other person is sending it to their own number. In this confusion, Surya aborts his plan to commit suicide, and his friend comes to his rescue. Vennela gets a call from her father saying her grandmother had had a heart attack. After a series of misunderstandings and conflicts, they became friends on the condition that they not meet. One day, Vennela comes across one of her friends who was cheated by her online boyfriend, who had asked her for money as a favor and never returned it. She decides to meet Surya at the clock tower, to which he agrees. Both reach the place; however, Surya is in a windy place, while Vennela is in a sunny place. Though Surya explains this to Vennela, she does not understand. Surya gets an umbrella from a kid, reaches home, and calls Vennela. Vennela, feeling cheated that Surya wanted to get money from her, answers the call and starts to fight. During the fight, Surya asks her to watch the television, where the news reports a cyclone; however, Vennela tells him that the news is all about the Telangana agitation, to which Surya responds that a separate Telangana state was declared on February 18, 2014. Then he realises that Vennela is in 2014, when she confirms the date as February 14, 2014, while he is in 2019.

Vennela feels that Surya has cheated her; however, she is surprised when the separation of Telangana is announced on February 18, as Surya had said to her. She asks Surya to come to the clock tower and wants to know whether any other incident occurred that day to confirm they are from different timelines. Unable to figure out any incident, she scribbles on the bench where they both are sitting in their respective timelines, which Surya confirms. Both try to meet the other person within their respective timelines, on Vennela's grandmother's advice, but to no avail. Time passes, and their friendship blossoms. One day, Vennela proposes to Surya while they are sitting on the same bench. However, Surya says he never had feelings for her and may not love anyone, having been rejected by the person he loved. Vennela gets angry with him and hangs up. An unknown person proposes to her, but she slaps and rejects him. The unknown person happens to be Surya. Vennela and her grandmother start drinking, thinking about her rejection. Meanwhile, Surya calls Vennela to find out if she is fine and tells her his story, revealing his life, how he fell in love, being rejected by his love, getting drunk, and his father's death.

As her father wants to finalize the marriage, she says that if she does not clear the entrance test, she will do as he says. Her grandmother comes up with a plan to get the answers from Surya for the 2014 exam in 2019. Vennela passes the exam with an All India rank of 87. Though her father is impressed by her, she feels guilty for cheating, and Surya asks her to disclose it to her father. Surya receives multiple calls from Vennela on his father's death anniversary. When he is revived, he realizes that Vennela can save his father and guides her to the place where his father was found dead. It happens to be that his father died saving Vennela, whom some thugs kidnapped. Vennela realizes the same but loses her phone during the tussle. She tries multiple times to meet Surya, but nature keeps stopping her. Not knowing any of this, 2019 Surya tries to contact her but receives no response because Vennela has lost her phone. Vennela's grandmother tells her that nature does not want her to meet Surya and that, in the future, Surya will not have Vennela by his side. Surya, remembering one of his interactions with Vennela, goes to the lakeside, where she keeps wishes in letters under the Lord Rama idol. He reads one containing his father's last wish and finds the guitar that he loved as a gift. Surya decides to participate in a music competition and performs well.

Meanwhile, Surya asks one of his friends to find out what has happened to Vennela's number, as he is unable to contact her. His friend tells him that since the number was disabled in 2014, the same number was given to Surya. She also mentions that Vennela died in a car accident on the same day as his performance. Looking at the newspaper, Surya realizes that Vennela is none other than the woman he proposed to. 2014 Surya receives his father's belongings and comes across Vennela's mobile phone, then calls the last number. 2019 Surya answers the call and realizes that 2014 Surya is on the other side. He guides 2014 Surya to reach Vennela and save her from her impending death. However, Vennela's car is involved in an accident. Surya, dejected, goes to the clock tower. He finds Vennela standing behind him, and they hug. It is shown that Vennela sees one of Surya's friends and gets out of the car before the car is involved in an accident. She explains that she left for higher studies after listening to her grandmother, and since she came back, she has tried to meet him, but every time she tried, there was some harm to his life, one being the incident shown at the beginning. She mentions that she was always around him, as she used to order him food daily and also give him an umbrella. She also mentions that she waited for the day she lost her mobile phone to meet him, which happened to be the day of his performance. They understand that whatever has happened is nature-driven and are brought together after each of them has fulfilled their goals.

== Cast ==
- Teja Sajja as Surya
- Shivani Rajashekar as Vennela
- Sathya as Prasad, Surya's friend
- Sivaji Raja as Chandra Mohan, Surya's father
- Devi Prasad as Vennala's father
- Tulasi Shivamani as Vennela's grandmother
- Jaiyetri Makana as Surya's friend, also one of the band members
- Divyasree as Vennela's friend

== Soundtrack ==
The soundtrack was composed by Radhan and released by Lahari Music.

Adbhutham

Soundtrack album by Radhan
- Released: 2021
- Recorded: 2021
- Genre: Soundtrack
- Length: 4:06
- Label: Lahari Music
- Producer: Radhan

Radhan chronology
Paagal (2021)	Adbhutham (2021)	Sila Nerangalil Sila Manidhargal (2022)

Track listing
No.	Title	Lyrics	Singer(s)	Length
1.	"Perenti Oorenti"	Krishna Kanth	Yogisekar, Sameera Bharadwaj	4:06
2.	"Arrere Enti E Dorram"	Krishna Kanth	Satya Yamini, Sweekar Agastya	1:45

== Release ==
Initially planned as a theatrical film and a debut for both the leading actors, the film was postponed and eventually premiered on Disney+ Hotstar on November 19, 2021.

== Reception ==
Mukesh Manjunath writing for Film Companion praised the film to be one of the best entertainers of the year. Sangeetha Devi Dundoo writing for The Hindu, noted that this science fiction romance comedy does not leverage on its interesting premise.
