= Shalini Vadnikatti =

Indian actress

- Occupation: Actor
- Years active: 2015–present

Shalini Vadnikatti is an Indian actress who works primarily in Telugu films.

== Career ==
She made her Kannada debut with Plus (2015). While working in a Tamil television series, Vadnikatti was able to get a role in Vellaiya Irukiravan Poi Solla Maatan that same year. Vadnikatti went on to star in several Kannada films including Rajaru (2017) and Mr Perfect (2017). She made her Telugu debut with Eureka (2020), a college drama.

== Filmography ==
=== Film ===
Key
†	Denotes films that have not yet been released

Year	Film	Role	Language	Notes	Ref.
2015	Plus	Nidhi	Kannada	Debut film	
2015	Vellaiya Irukiravan Poi Solla Maatan	Pooja	Tamil	Tamil Debut	
2017	Rajaru		Kannada		
2017	Mr Perfect	Sirisha	Kannada		
2020	Eureka	Jahnavi	Telugu	Telugu Debut	
2020	Krishna and His Leela	Radha	Telugu		
2020	Bhanumathi & Ramakrishna	Nimisha Boppana "Nimmi"	Telugu		
2025	28 Degree Celsius	Anjali	Telugu		

=== Television ===
Year	Title	Role	Language	Network	Notes
2015	Majaa Talkies	Contestant	Kannada	ETV Kannada	Sketch comedy show
2017	Nenu Mee Kalyan	Geetha	Telugu	YouTube	web debut
