= Pragathi Yadhati =

- Born: Pragathi; Anantapur, Andhra Pradesh, India
- Occupation: Actress
- Parents: Yadhati Kasipathi; Pushpa Latha
- Relatives: Vennela Yadhati (sister)
- Modeling information
- Height: 5 ft 7 in (170 cm)
- Hair color: Black
- Eye color: Brown

Pragathi Yadhati is a theatre and film actress based in New York City. She is also a model, playwright and a poet

== Early life ==
She is from Hyderabad, Telangana and she was born in Anantapur. Her father Yadhati Kasipathy is a revolutionary activist, thinker, orator, writer, poet and a journalist who worked hundreds of hours with Srirangam Srinivasarao for the development on revolutionary front and in the areas of language and literature. Her mother is Pushpalatha.

She has learnt Bharata Natyam at the age of 4 and she learnt Kathak from the kathak exponent Pandit Anju babu and did her Arangetram when she was 16.

== Career ==
Pragathi went to The Lee Strasberg Theatre and Film Institute for a two year program and while she was studying there, She started her career in Bollywood with the film, Ooops a Desi which was premiered at TimeSquare, New York and she also played the lead role in an independent feature film Iraade Maum ke. She received critical acclaim for her roles in both the films.

She has done several plays in New York City including the classical Shakespeare theatre. She has played a character in Supercapitalist which was premiered at Asian American International Film Festival. She is now playing the lead actress in an upcoming magical realism movie The Ring around the Rose. It is being shot simultaneously in multiple languages (Hindi / Malayalam / Tamil / Spanish).

== Filmography ==
Year	Film	Role	Language	Notes
2010	Iraade Maum Ke	Shobana	Hindi	Debut film
2012	Supercapitalist	Bhavini Raval	English	
2013	Ooops a Desi	Sonia	Hindi	
