= Guntur Talkies =

2016 Telugu film directed by Praveen Sattaru

- Theatrical release poster
- Directed by: Praveen Sattaru
- Screenplay by: Praveen Sattaru
- Story by: Praveen Sattaru
- Produced by: M. Raaj Kumar
- Starring: Siddhu Jonnalagadda; Rashmi Gautam; Shraddha Das; Naresh
- Cinematography: Raam Reddy
- Edited by: Dharmendra Kakarala
- Music by: Sricharan Pakala
- Production company: R. K. Studios
- Release date: 4 March 2016
- Running time: 158 min
- Country: India
- Language: Telugu

Guntur Talkies is a 2016 Indian Telugu-language crime comedy film produced and directed by Praveen Sattaru, who co-wrote the film with Siddu Jonnalagadda. The film stars Jonnalagadda, Rashmi Gautam, Shraddha Das, and Naresh. The music was composed by Sricharan Pakala with cinematography by Raam Reddy and editing by Dharmendra Kakarala. The film released on 4 March 2016 and was a sleeper hit. It was remade in Tamil as Evanukku Engeyo Matcham Irukku (2018).

== Plot ==
Hari (Siddu Jonnalagadda) and Giri (Naresh) live in a slum in Guntur and work as a low-end salesmen in a medical shop managed by a greedy man (Gundu Sudarshan). They have a secret life of petty thieves. They steal small and insignificant items so that nobody recognizes them and complains to the police. One day both of them steal ₹10 lakhs of money and run away to Goa. Suddenly they are chased by police and mafia. Rest of the story is about how they escape from them and how they settle in their life.

== Cast ==
- Siddu Jonnalagadda as Hari
- Rashmi Gautam as Suvarna
- Shraddha Das as Revolver Rani
- Naresh as Giridhar "Giri"
- Gundu Sudarshan as Medical Shop Owner
- Mahesh Manjrekar as Jackie
- Raja Ravindra as Police Officer
- Raghu Babu as CI Ranjith Kumar
- Pavala Syamala as Giri's mother
- Thagubothu Ramesh as Constable
- Jogi Naidu
- Karate Kalyani
- Jayavani as Suvarna's elder sister
- Apoorva as Roja Rani, Giri's wife
- Snigdha
- Allari Subhashini
- Jayavani
- Lakshmi Manchu (special appearance)
- Chaitanya Krishna (special appearance)

== Soundtrack ==
No.	Title	Singer(s)	Length
1.	"Guntur Talkies"	Siddu Jonnalagadda
2.	"Nee Sontham"	Ambika Sashital, Anant Srikar
3.	"Chaar Sau Bees"	Sricharan Pakala
4.	"Jackie"	Aditya Ramnath
5.	"Oo Suvarna"	Sri Vidya
