= Aswathama (film) =

2020 Indian Telugu-language action thriller film

- Theatrical release poster
- Directed by: Ramana Teja
- Screenplay by: Ramana Teja; Phanindra Bikkina
- Story by: Naga Shourya
- Produced by: Usha Mulpuri
- Starring: Naga Shourya; Jisshu Sengupta; Mehreen Pirzada
- Cinematography: Manojh Reddy Katasani
- Edited by: Garry BH
- Music by: Songs: Sricharan Pakala; Score: Ghibran
- Production companies: Ira Creations; Anji Industeries
- Release date: 31 January 2020
- Running time: 133 minutes
- Country: India
- Language: Telugu
- Box office: est. ₹13.65 crore (5 days)

Aswathama is a 2020 Indian Telugu-language action thriller film directed by debutant Raman Teja from a story written by Naga Shourya and produced by Usha Mulpuri under Ira Creations banner. The film stars Naga Shourya, Jisshu Sengupta and Mehreen Pirzada in the lead roles, while Sargun Kaur Luthra, Harish Uthaman, Prince Cecil and Jayaprakash play supporting roles. Ghibran scored the film with the soundtrack composed by Sricharan Pakala.

Aswathama was released on 31 January 2020 and received mixed reviews from critics but failed at box office.

== Plot ==
Gana returns to Visakhapatnam, India for his sister Priya's wedding. Following her engagement, he is shocked to see her attempting suicide one night. She reveals that she was taking the extreme step because she is pregnant but does not know who impregnated her. Gana informs her fiancé Ravi, who understands the situation, helps Priya get aborted, and promises to keep this a secret. Gana further convinces Priya to move on and forget about the past, which she does, and she happily gets married.

After her wedding, Gana violently fights and interrogates men who eve-teased Priya in the past, only to learn none of them is behind her impregnation. Soon, another woman, named Sadhana who was mysteriously impregnated, commits suicide. Gana reads her suicide letter, explaining she got pregnant without her knowledge. Gana meets her parents and discovers her hospital reports, according to which she fainted 3 months ago and was admitted by someone. Realising Priya also fainted and was admitted, Gana goes to the hospital and finds out Sadhana was admitted in an emergency by an ambulance. He then learns that other women named Lakshmi and Monica were also admitted by a similar ambulance.

The next day, Gana's girlfriend Neha informs him about her friend who fainted in the mall and was taken in an ambulance that hasn't arrived at the hospital yet. Gana rushes to the hospital and, with help from the technical department, chases after the ambulances equipped with trackers. He stops many ambulances but doesn't find Neha's friend inside. Soon, he reaches a dead end and abandons his bike. Using his parkour skills, he chases after an ambulance, only to find him looking at another one that isn't being tracked. He ambushes the ambulance, fights off the men inside, and rescues Neha's friend.

Dr. Manoj Kumar is a pathologist who is revealed to be the perpetrator behind the women's pregnancy. He selects random, beautiful girls and women in the city, targets them through local fishermen, and tactically abducts them. He then rapes the sedated women and leaves them in the hospitals. The women do not realise their rape upon gaining consciousness. Being a pathologist, he believes no one can suspect him for the abductions and rapes. After learning of the brawl, he eliminates the fishermen, leaving no evidence against him. Later, Neha questions Gana's recent behaviour towards her, forcing him to reveal his sister's recent ordeal.

Soon, a minister's daughter named Sowmya is abducted by Manoj's grandfather. When Manoj is molesting her, she regains consciousness. A fearful Manoj kills her brutally and her corpse is dropped in front of the police station as a challenge. Meanwhile, with Neha's help, Gana manages to access Sowmya's laptop and sees photos where he spots an older man, Manoj's grandfather. Further, Gana manages to access CCTV footage of Sowmya buying a perfume from a vendor who reveals the older man told him to sell the perfumes and paid him for it.

Since Sowmya was a drug addict, she wasn't unconscious long enough despite being subject to anesthesia. Despite his friend's insistence not to do so, Manoj ended up killing her. Back in the present, the cops ask Manoj to perform an autopsy on Sowmya.

Gana then explains to Neha that all the victims, though unrelated, were admitted to the hospital because of hypoglycemia induced artificially by a contraband drug called Hypomacene. Gana later visits the mall to view surveillance footage and discovers an address that leads him to Manoj's house. Having seen him talk about the autopsy on TV, Gana asks him for help with the case, while Manoj tells him to wait for coffee. Manoj explains to his friend that he'd kill Gana, but receiving a call from Neha about the older man dumping another corpse in front of the police station, Gana suddenly leaves.

A car chase ensues, resulting in the older man's death after Manoj drops a cargo container on his car. Gana then goes to Manoj's house, where he discovers dead bodies in separate vessels before Manoj arrives there with his friend.

Manoj's past is revealed where Manoj's friend, who turns out to be his father, removes his belt, and starts beating him for not committing the perfect crime. It is then revealed that Manoj, during his youth who lusts over girls all the time and molests his maid's daughter. His father manages the situation and beats him with the belt to discipline him for being caught. This reveals his psychopathy and eventually he killed his father along with the maid and her daughter. Later, he warns his grandfather not to reveal any of these facts and pleads him not to make him an orphan. Since that day, his grandfather became his accomplice out of fear and he has been hallucinating that his father warns him for his wrong deeds.

Back in the present, Gana thrashes Manoj, throws him into an almirah. Manoj is laughing, but he faints. Gana drops a chandelier over him, killing him. He then receives a call from his father, who pranks him into believing a man is trying to harass Priya. Gana arrives home and finds out Priya is now pregnant with Ravi's child.

== Cast ==
- Naga Shourya as Gana
- Jisshu Sengupta as Dr. Manoj Kumar (Voice dubbed by Hemachandra)
  - Ankith Koyya as young Manoj Kumar
- Mehreen Pirzada as Neha, Gana's love interest
- Harish Uthaman as Kishore
- Sargun Kaur Luthra as Priya, Gana's sister
- Prince Cecil as Ravi, Priya's fiancée
- Aadarsh Balakrishna as Jaga
- Jayaprakash as Gana's father
- Pavitra Lokesh as Gana's mother
- Surekha Vani as Gana's aunt
- Satya as Gana's cousin
- Posani Krishna Murali as Police Chief
- M. S. Bhaskar as Manoj's grandfather
- Sony Sharma as Sony
- Dimpi as Rita
- Heena as Monica
- Santhoshi Sharma as Sonali. Minster's daughter
- Anita

== Production ==
Principal Photography of the film finished during the last quarter of 2019.

== Soundtrack ==
Aswathama

Soundtrack album by Sricharan Pakala
- Released: 25 January 2020
- Recorded: 2019
- Venue: Hyderabad, Chennai, Mumbai
- Studio: Jubilee10 studios, Contrabass studios, Audio Garage studios
- Genre: Feature film soundtrack
- Length: 14:05
- Label: Aditya Music
- Producer: Sricharan Pakala

Sricharan Pakala chronology
| Operation Gold Fish (2019) | Aswathama (2020) | Krishna and His Leela (2020) |
External audio
- Official Audio Jukebox on YouTube

The music was composed by Sricharan Pakala, and released on Aditya Music label.

Track list
| No. | Title | Lyrics | Singer(s) | Length |
|---|---|---|---|---|
| 1. | "Aswathama Title song" | Ramajogayya Sastry | Divya Kumar | 4:01 |
| 2. | "Ninne Ninne" | V N V Ramesh Kumar | Armaan Malik, Yaamini Ghantasala | 3:21 |
| 3. | "Maahi" | Kasarla Shyam | Poojan Kohli | 3:22 |
| 4. | "Andaga Annaga" | V N V Ramesh Kumar | Vedala Hemachandra | 3:21 |
| Total length: | | | | 14:05 |

== Release ==
The film was released on 31 January 2020.

=== Reception ===
Neeshita Nyayapati of The Times of India gave 3/5 stars and wrote "Aswathama delivers what it promises – a riveting story and oodles of action. Ramana Teja makes a good debut by sticking to the subject at hand without too much deviation". Y. Sunita Chowdhary of The Hindu praised the action sequences, but found the storyline being "ridden with a lot of predictability."

Hemanth Kumar of Firstpost gave 3/5 stars and wrote "Aswathama does have a lot going in its favour. It sticks to what it wants to say without meandering too much. If only it had found a better way to end the story, and not reveal its suspense in such a simple manner."

== Home media ==
The film's satellite rights were sold to Gemini TV and it was released digitally via Sun NXT and JioCinema.
