= Gatham =

- Film poster
- Directed by: Kiran Kondamadugula
- Screenplay by: Kiran Kondamadugula
- Story by: Kiran Kondamadugula
- Produced by: Srujan Yarabolu; Harsha Vardhan Pratap
- Starring: Bhargava Poludasu; Rakesh Galebhe; Poojitha Kuraparthi; USS Uppuluri; Lakshmi Bharadwaj
- Cinematography: Manojh Reddy Katasani
- Edited by: GS
- Music by: Sricharan Pakala
- Production companies: Offbeat Films; S Originals
- Distributed by: Amazon Prime Video
- Release date: 6 November 2020
- Running time: 102 minutes
- Country: India
- Language: Telugu

Gatham (transl. Past) is a 2020 Indian Telugu-language thriller film directed by Kiran Kondamadugula and starring Bhargava Poludasu, Rakesh Galebhe, and Poojitha Kuraparthi. It premiered on Amazon Prime Video on 6 November 2020. The film was selected in the Indian Panorama of feature films 2020 and was screened at International Film Festival of India in January 2021.

Entire film was shot in California, USA during extreme winter conditions that lasted 28 days from December to January 2019.

Originally, the makers planned for a theatrical release, but due to the COVID-19 pandemic, it was decided to release the film through the OTT service Amazon Prime Video. The film was released worldwide on 6 November 2020 to generally positive reviews. After the successful run with Amazon Prime Video, Gatham is streaming on Netflix currently.

== Plot ==
Rishi (Rakesh Galebhe) wakes up from a coma and remembers nothing from his past. He sets out on a journey along with his girlfriend Meera (Poojitha Kuraparthi) to visit Rishi's father, but their car breaks down in a route. A stranger (Bhargava Poludasu) offers them a stay at his house, and as their stay extends, Rishi gets nightmares and the stranger behaves freakishly. With each passing moment, there are startling twists, and many dots between Rishi's past and the stranger get connected, which leaves the couple shell-shocked. What is Rishi's connection with the stranger and how does he and Meera come out of the weird situation is the story of Gatham.

== Cast ==
- Bhargava Poludasu as Arjun
- Rakesh Galebhe as Rishi
- Poojitha Kuraparthi as Meera
- Thirumudi Thulasiraman as Ramesh
- Harsha Vardhan Pratap as Harsha
- Uss Uppuluri as Dr. Srikanth
- Sof Puchley as Sarah Peters
- Raghu Gopal as Laxman
- Prasad Rani as Dr. Viswa
- Lakshmi Bharadwaj

== Production ==
The film was produced in the United States. It is based on Kiran Kondamadugula's own short film and was shot in Lake Tahoe. Sricharan Pakala scored the music for the film.

== Release ==
Due to COVID-19 pandemic, the film was only released on Amazon Prime Video on 6 November.

== Reception ==
Rajeev Masand praised the movie quoting "How a scrappy little indie movie found its way to an organic success!"

Vishal Menon of Film Companion wrote, "Gatham is one of those films that’s impossible to talk about without revealing spoilers but it’s a credit to its makers that viewers feel like running around explaining the crafty deception of the film they’ve just watched."

Sangeetha Devi Dundoo, writing for The Hindu, said that "Gatham is a deceptively engaging thriller."

Neeshita Nyayapati, writing for Times of India, summarized Gatham as "Uncomfortable and gritty, Gatham will keep you engaged from the get-go."

Bhuvanesh Chandar of The New Indian Express wrote, "Outstanding suspense cinema that checks all boxes."

Sushri Sahu of Mashable wrote, "A Lackluster NRI Film That Reveals Itself To Be A Taut Psychological Thriller"
