= Seerat Kapoor =

Indian film actress (born 1994)

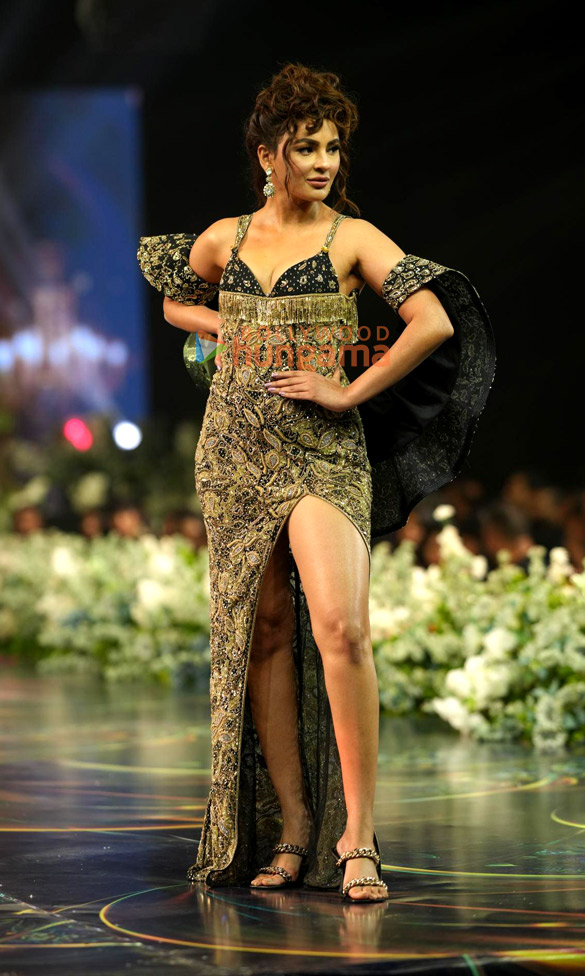
- Kapoor in 2014
- Born: Seerath Kapoor; 3 April 1994 (age 32); Mumbai, Maharashtra, India
- Occupations: Dance Instructor, Actress, Choreographer, Model
- Years active: 2014–present

Seerat Kapoor (born 3 April 1994) is an Indian actress, model, choreographer and dancer who predominantly works in Telugu cinema. She began her career as an Assistant Choreographer. She made her acting debut in 2014 Telugu film Run Raja Run.

== Early life ==
Kapoor was born on 3 April 1994 in Mumbai, India. Her father, the late Vineet Kapoor was a hotelier and her mother, Neena Sihota Kapoor, is an air hostess with Air India. Kapoor was educated at Mumbai's Podar International School, Santa Cruz and completed her pre-university course at R. D. National College, Bandra. She subsequently enrolled for a Bachelor Of Arts degree in Mass communication, but quit it due to scheduling conflicts with her acting.

At the time, she was at the peak of her dance career, which she began at age 16 for Bollywood choreographer; Ashley Lobo, The Danceworx, Mumbai. Kapoor was a full-time dance instructor at the academy. In the course of her journey, Kapoor worked on Rockstar and was brought on board as Assistant Choreographer.

Intrigued by modelling, she trained as an actor at her cousin's grandfather's institution, Roshan Tanejaa School Of Acting. In 2014, Kapoor debuted in Run Raja Run.

== Career ==
In 2011 Kapoor have worked as assistant choreographer in Rockstar film. she announced in 2014 that she would appear in Run Raja Run opposite Sharwanand, directed by Sujeeth. Run Raja Run was a commercial success.

In 2015 Madhu B. and N.V. Prasad signed her to play Ganga in the action film Tiger. Set against the backdrop of Varanasi, the film also starred Sundeep Kishan and Rahul Ravindran. Her next release (2015) came alongside Sumanth Ashwin in the R. Shamala directed romantic comedy, Columbus, produced by Ashwani Kumar Sahdev. Kapoor's performance was applauded as the highlight of the film in the role of Neeraja.

In October 2017, she completed filming Raju Gari Gadhi 2 opposite Nagarjuna and was filming Touch Chesi Chudu opposite Ravi Teja and Allu Sirish's Okka Kshanam. Her latest release was on Netflix titled Krishna and His Leela (2020)

Kapoor endorsed several brands and products, including Vivel, Engage Cologne Sprays, Apollo Tyres for Dibakar Banerjee, Mahindra gusto and Intex with Farhan Akhtar. She is currently shooting for big screen project of Dil Raju’s Production.

== Other work ==
In addition to acting and dancing, Kapoor is a trained Indian Classical singer from Rajesree School Of Music from age 12. She is also a fitness enthusiast.

== Filmography ==
Year	Film	Role	Language	Notes	Ref.
2014	Zid	Nancy	Hindi		
2014	Run Raja Run	Priya	Telugu		
2015	Tiger	Ganga	Telugu		
2015	Columbus	Neeraja	Telugu		
2017	Raju Gari Gadhi 2	Suhanisa	Telugu		
2017	Okka Kshanam	Swathi	Telugu		
2018	Touch Chesi Chudu	Divya	Telugu		
2020	Krishna and His Leela	Rukhsar	Telugu		
2020	Maa Vintha Gadha Vinuma	Vineetha Venugopal	Telugu		
2022	Maarrich	Reena	Hindi		
2024	Bhamakalapam 2	Zubeida	Telugu		
2024	Manamey	Tanya	Telugu		
2024	Usha Parinayam	Herself	Telugu	Special appearance in the song "Ghallu Ghallu"	

=== Television ===
Year	Title	Role	Network	Ref.
2023	Save the Tigers	Hamsalekha	Disney+ Hotstar	

=== Music videos ===
Year	Song	Singer(s)	Note(s)	Ref.
2021	Slow Slow	Payal Dev, Badshah	T-Series	
