= List of Telugu films of 2010 =

2010s Telugu Movies

This is a list of films produced in the Telugu film industry in India in 2010.

== Box office ==
Highest-grossing films of 2010
| Rank | Title | Studio | Worldwide gross | Ref. |
|---|---|---|---|---|
| 1 | Simha | United Movies | ₹60 crore | |
| 2 | Brindavanam | Sri Venkateswara Creations | ₹35 crore distributor's share | |
| 3 | Maryada Ramanna | Arka Media Works | ₹52 crore | |
| 4 | Adhurs | Vaishnavi Arts | ₹28-30 crore distributor's share | |
| 5 | Darling | Sri Venkateswara Cine Chitra | ₹36 crore | |
| 6 | Orange | Anjana Productions | ₹19.5 crore distributor's share | |
| 7 | Puli | Kanagarathna Movies | ₹19 crore distributor's share | |
| 8 | Khaleja | Kanakaratna Movies | ₹32 crore | |
| 9 | Nagavalli | Sri Sai Ganesh Productions | ₹17.34 crore distributor's share | |
| 10 | Ragada | Kamakshi Movies | ₹30.5 crore | |

== January–June ==
| Opening | | Title | Director | Cast | Production house | Ref |
|---|---|---|---|---|---|---|
| J A N | 1 | Maa Nanna Chiranjeevi | Arun Prasad | Jagapati Babu, Neelima, Athulith, Brahmanandam | Produced by Laughing Lords Entertainments | |
| J A N | 1 | Premistu | Raghavendra | Ramana, Swathi | Produced by Aadilaxmi Movies | |
| J A N | 1 | Yugalageetham | Sivaji | Srikar, Abhishek, Chandu | Produced by GVS Entertainments | |
| J A N | 10 | Om Shanti | Prakash Dantuluri | Navdeep, Kajal Aggarwal | Vyjayanthi films | |
| J A N | 13 | Adhurs | V. V. Vinayak | NTR Jr, Nayantara, Sheela, Mahesh Manjrekar | Produced by Vaishnavi Arts Pvt Ltd | |
| J A N | 14 | Namo Venkatesa | Seenu Vytla | Venkatesh, Trisha Krishnan, Brahmanandam | Produced by 14 Reels Entertainment | |
| J A N | 14 | Shambo Shiva Shambo | Samudrakani | Ravi Teja, Allari Naresh, Siva Balaji, Priyamani, Abhinaya | Produced by Global Infotainment | |
| J A N | 22 | Kaluva | M. Sridhar | Chakri, Rupa Kaur, Fharzana | Produced by Shubha Lakshmi Entertainers | |
| J A N | 22 | Seeta Ramula Kalyanam Lankalo | Eshwar | Nitin, Hansika Motwani, Brahmanandam | Produced by Welfare Creations | |
| J A N | 22 | Udatha Udatha Ooch | Murali Ganesh | Sunil-Lee Akshay, Ali, Brahmanandam | Produced by BG Ventures | |
| F E B | 5 | Bindaas | Veeru Potla | Manoj Manchu, Sheena Shahabadi | AK Entertainments ATV | |
| F E B | 12 | Kedi | Kiran Kumar | Nagarjuna, Mamta Mohandas, Chitrangada Singh | Produced by Annapurna Studios | |
| F E B | 19 | Joy | B. R. Varma | Avitej, Trinath, Vainavi, Parvati | Produced by Arunai Pictures | |
| F E B | 19 | Leader | Sekhar Kammula | Rana Daggubati, Richa Gangopadhyay, Priya Anand | Produced by AVM Productions | |
| F E B | 20 | Kalavar King | Suresh | Nikhil Siddharth, Shweta Prasad, Ali, Ajay, Y. Kasi Viswanath, Pragathi | Srinivasa Rao Dammalapati M. Chandrasekhar | |
| F E B | 26 | Ye Maaya Chesave | Gautham Vasudev Menon | Naga Chaitanya, Samantha Ruth Prabhu, Krishnudu | Produced by Indira Productions | |
| F E B | 26 | Inkosaari | Suman Pathuri | Raja, Manjari Phadnis, Richa Pallod | Bay Movies | |
| M A R | 5 | High School | Narasimha Nandi | Kiran Rathod, Karthik | Produced by Aiswarya Films | |
| M A R | 5 | Sadhyam | Karthikeya Gopalakrishna | Jagapati Babu, Priyamani | Kumar Brothers Cinema | |
| M A R | 12 | Dasanna | DSP | Srihari, Meena, Suman | Produced by Visakha Takies | |
| M A R | 12 | Prema Rajyam | Moolapati | Ramkiran, Meerakrishna | Produced by Sri Hanuman Productions | |
| M A R | 12 | Tik Tik Tik | Arunakanth | Krishna Bhagawan, Sairabanu, Sharif | Produced by Arunodaya Film Works | |
| M A R | 12 | Aakasa Ramanna | G. Ashok | Allari Naresh, Sivaji, Rajiv Kanakala | Manyam Entertainments | |
| M A R | 19 | Sandadi | Mani | Sasi Pawan, Suhasini, Keerthi | Produced by All India Entertainments | |
| M A R | 19 | Yagam | P. A. Arun Prasad | Navdeep, Bhoomika Chawla, Kim Sharma | Produced by Silver Screen Movies | |
| M A R | 20 | Taj Mahal | Arun Singaraju | Sivaji, Shruthi | Produced by Sri Sivaji Productions | |
| M A R | 26 | Maro Charitra | Ravi Yadav | Varun Sandesh, Anita Galler, Shraddha Das | Produced by Dil Raju | |
| M A R | 26 | My Name is Amrutha | M. Anthony | Baby Gayathri, Bhanupriya, Bhanuchander | Produced by S Entertainment | |
| M A R | 31 | Varudu | Gunasekhar | Allu Arjun, Arya, Bhanu Mehra | Produced by IKON Entertainment | |
| A P R | 2 | Anaganaga Oka Aranyam | G. Shekar Chandra | Kaushal, Ekta Trivedi, Srirekha | Produced by Happy Movie Creations | |
| A P R | 2 | Srimathi Kalyanam | Sival | Vadde Naveen, Sangeetha, Venu Madhav | Produced by Rama Sai Productions | |
| A P R | 9 | Betting Bangarraju | Satti Babu | Allari Naresh, Nidhi | Produced by Usha Kiron Movies | |
| A P R | 9 | Mouna Ragam | Vijay Balaji | Tanish, Madhuurima, Suhasini | Produced by Sri Saidava Productions | |
| A P R | 9 | Police Police | Manmohan | Prithviraj, Sriram, Kamalini Mukherjee, Sanjana | Produced by Green Apple | |
| A P R | 16 | 1940 Lo Oka Gramam | Narasimha Nandi | Bala Aditya, Shree | Produced by Usha Kiran Movies | |
| A P R | 16 | Madhanudu | Joe | Swati Rachana, Aarmugam | Produced by Surya Powerful Movies | |
| A P R | 16 | Prasthanam | Deva Katta | Sharwanand, Sai Kumar, Sundeep Kishan | Produced by VRC Media & Entertainment | |
| A P R | 23 | Darling | Karunakaran | Prabhas, Kajal Aggarwal, Shraddha Das | Produced by Sri Venkateswara Cine Chitra | |
| A P R | 30 | Buridi | E. V. V. Satyanarayana | Aryan Rajesh, Aishwarya | Produced by Big B Productions | |
| A P R | 30 | Glamour | P. Satya Reddy | Karishma Kotak, Kavitha | Produced by Surya Powerful Movies | |
| A P R | 30 | Simha | Boyapati Srinu | Balakrishna, Nayantara, Sneha Ullal, Namitha | Produced by United Movies | |
| M A Y | 14 | Andari Bandhuvaya | Chandra Siddhartha | Sharwanand, Padmapriya, Naresh | | |
| M A Y | 14 | Rama Rama Krishna Krishna | | Ram, Arjun, Priya Anand, Bindu Madhavi | | |
| M A Y | 14 | Young India | Dasari Narayana Rao | Pradyumna, Arvind Krishna, Soumya Bollapragada | Produced by Siri Media | |
| M A Y | 21 | Chalaki | | Aditya Babu, Roma Asrani, Bianca Desai | | |
| M A Y | 28 | Golimaar | Puri Jagannadh | Gopichand, Priyamani, Nassar | | |
| J U N | 4 | Vedam | Radhakrishna Jagarlamudi | Allu Arjun, Anushka Shetty, Manoj Manchu, Manoj Bajpayee | | |
| J U N | 11 | Nagamani | | Krishna Bhagawan, Sona | | |
| J U N | 11 | Panchakshari | | Anushka Shetty, Vijay Samrat, Bramanandam | | |
| J U N | 25 | Pappu | | Krishnudu, Subbaraju, Deepika | | |

== July–December ==
| Opening | | Title | Director | Cast | Production house | Ref |
|---|---|---|---|---|---|---|
| J U L | 2 | Jhummandi Naadam | K.Raghavendra Rao | Manoj Manchu, Taapsee Pannu, Mohan Babu | | |
| J U L | 2 | Komaram Bheem | | Bhopal Reddy, Maunika, Telangana Sakuntala | | |
| J U L | 9 | Bheemili Kabaddi Jattu | | Nani, Saranya Mohan, Kishoreu | | |
| J U L | 9 | Veera Telangana | R.Narayana Murthy | R. Narayana Murthy, Vijayaranga Raju | | |
| J U L | 16 | Em Pillo Em Pillado | Chowdary | Tanish, Pranitha, Charanraj | | |
| J U L | 16 | Sneha Geetham | Madhura Sreedhar | Chitralekha, Anil, Gundu Hanumantha Rao | | |
| J U L | 16 | Shubhapradham | K. Viswanath | Allari Naresh, Manjari Phadnis, Sarath Babu | | |
| J U L | 23 | Maryada Ramanna | S. S. Rajamouli | Sunil, Saloni Aswani, Nagineedu | | |
| J U L | 30 | Comedy Express | | Kaushal, Babu Mohan, Rajesh | | |
| J U L | 30 | Maa Annayya Bangaram | Jonnalagadda Srinivas | Rajasekhar, Kamalinee Mukherjee, Rohit | | |
| A U G | 6 | Don Seenu | Gopichand | Ravi Teja, Shriya Saran, Anjana Sukhani, Srihari | | |
| A U G | 13 | Sye Aata | | Charmi, Ajay, Rao Ramesh | | |
| A U G | 20 | Happy Happy Ga | | Varun Sandesh, Vega Tamotia, Saranya Mohan, P. Ravi Shankar | | |
| A U G | 20 | Ramdev | | Abbas, Sai Kiran, Gracy Singh | | |
| A U G | 27 | Aunty Uncle Nandagopal | | Vadde Naveen, Lakshana, Bramhanandam | | |
| A U G | 27 | Gudu Gudu Gunjam | | Parthu, Aarthi Puri, Rajendra Prasad | | |
| S E P | 3 | Gaayam 2 | | Jagapati Babu, Vimala Raman, Kota Srinivasa Rao | | |
| S E P | 3 | Thakita Thakita | | Harsh Vardhan Rane, Haripriya, Vijay Samrat, Trinetrudu, Karthik Sabesh, Bhakti Punjani, Aditi Chengappa | | |
| S E P | 10 | Puli | S. J. Surya | Pawan Kalyan, Nikesha Patel, Manoj Bajpayee | | |
| S E P | 17 | Bhairava IPS | | Srihari, Sindhu Tolani, Tanikella Bharani | | |
| S E P | 17 | Saradagaa Kasepu | Vamsi | Allari Naresh, Madhurima, Srinivas Avasarala | | |
| O C T | 8 | Khaleja | Trivikram Srinivas | Mahesh Babu, Anushka Shetty, Prakash Raj | | |
| O C T | 15 | Brindavanam | Vamsi Paidipally | NTR Jr, Kajal Aggarwal, Samantha | | |
| O C T | 22 | Rakta Charitra | Ram Gopal Varma | Vivek Oberoi, Sudeep, Radhika Apte | | |
| O C T | 29 | Brahmalokam To Yamalokam Via Bhulokam | | Rajendra Prasad, Shivaji, Kalyani | | |
| N O V | 5 | Collector Gari Bharya | | Prakash Raj, Bhumika Chawla | | |
| N O V | 12 | Kalyanram Kathi | | Kalyan Ram, Shaam, Sana Khan, Saranya Mohan | | |
| N O V | 12 | Yemaindi Ee Vela | Sampath Nandi | Varun Sandesh, Nisha Aggarwal | | |
| N O V | 26 | Karma | Adivi Sesh | Adivi Sesh, Jade Tailor, Sher Ali | Produced by Thousand Lights Inc. | |
| N O V | 26 | Orange | Bhaskar | Ram Charan Teja, Genelia D'Souza, Shazahn Padamsee | Produced By Anjana Productions | |
| D E C | 3 | Aalasyam Amrutam | | Nikhil Siddharth, Madhurima, Arvind Krishna | | |
| D E C | 3 | Rakta Charitra 2 | Ram Gopal Varma | Vivek Oberoi, Sudeep, Radhika Apte | RGV Film Factory | |
| D E C | 10 | Kathi Kantha Rao | E. V. V. Satyanarayana | Allari Naresh, Kamna Jethmalani, Krishna Bhagawan | | |
| D E C | 10 | Manasara | Ravi Babu | Vikram, Sri Divya | | |
| D E C | 16 | Nagavalli | P. Vasu | Venkatesh, Anushka Shetty, Richa Gangopadhyay, Shraddha Das, Kamalinee Mukherjee, Poonam Kaur | | |
| D E C | 24 | Ragada | Veeru Potla | Nagarjuna, Anushka Shetty, Priyamani | | |
| D E C | 30 | Ranga The Donga | G. V. Sudhakar Naidu | Srikanth, Vimala Raman, Ramya Krishna | | |
| D E C | 31 | Broker | R. P. Patnaik | R. P. Patnaik, Srihari, Asha Saini | | |

== See also ==
- List of Telugu films of 2009
- Lists of Telugu-language films
- List of Telugu films of 2011
