= Aadyaa =

Aadya
- Film poster
- Directed by: K. M. Chaitanya
- Screenplay by: K. M. Chaitanya
- Story by: Adivi Sesh
- Based on: Kshanam by Ravikanth Perepu
- Produced by: T G Vishwaprasad; Raghunath S
- Starring: Chiranjeevi Sarja; Sruthi Hariharan; Sangeetha Bhat
- Cinematography: V. Malhar Bhatt Joshi
- Edited by: Akshay P. Rao
- Music by: V. Sridhar
- Production companies: People Media Factory; STF Entertainments
- Release date: 21 February 2020
- Running time: 120 minutes
- Country: India
- Language: Kannada

Aadya is a 2020 Indian Kannada thriller film directed by K. M. Chaitanya. It stars Chiranjeevi Sarja Sruthi Hariharan, and Sangeetha Bhat in the lead roles. The supporting cast includes Ravishankar Gowda and Shashank Purushotham.The score and soundtrack for the film is by Sridhar V Sambhram and the cinematography is by V Malhar Bhat Joshi. The film is the official remake of 2016 Telugu film Kshanam directed by Ravikanth Perepu.

== Plot ==
Aditya Shankar, a Kolkata-based investment banker, gets a voice call from his ex-girlfriend Sangeetha after a long gap. They studied medicine in the same college and wanted to marry, but her father arranged an alliance with an entrepreneur named Karthik. In the present, Aditya, who still loves Sangeetha, leaves for India on the pretense of attending a relative's marriage. Aditya hires a car from Kariya, a travel agent, takes a SIM card on his sister's address and stays at Hotel Marriott.

Aditya meets Sangeetha at a restaurant and learns her five-year-old daughter Aadyaa is missing. She laments that no one else, including Rajeev believes that Aadyaa actually never exists. Aditya also learns about Karthik's brother Sunny, a drug addict who regularly visits her home. Aditya begins an informal investigation which fails many times, also inviting the ire of two African-American gangsters in the city. Kariya, who helps them in transporting drugs, saves Aditya on humanitarian grounds. Posing as Ajith Kumar, a police officer, Aditya meets Rajeev and learns that the couple was childless.

Rajeev recalls Sangeetha being attacked by two masked men before a school to steal her car. He added that Sangeetha went into a coma and post-recovery started claiming that she had a five-year-old daughter named Aadyaa. Perplexed, Aditya later watches a closed-circuit television video footage of the masked men attacking Sangeetha on the day when Aadyaa went missing. Unfortunately, Aadyaa is seen nowhere in the footage, which makes Aditya doubt Sangeetha's mental condition. He confronts Sangeetha, who refuses to acknowledge that Aadyaa is imaginary.

Aditya sees height markings of a child on a wall, and before he could react, Sangeetha commits suicide in his presence. ACP Shruthi and Inspector Loki investigate the suicide case. Ajith is killed in Marriott, and Kariya confesses to Aditya that he saw Sunny kidnapping Aadyaa. They meet Shruthi and Loki and get Bobby arrested. In custody, Sunny is killed by Shruthi in an act of self-defense. That same night, Ajith's murderers attack Kariya and Aditya, and Kariya is killed in the process of shooting the murderers to death.

Aditya watches a MMS in the murderers' phone sent by Shruthi instructing to kill him. Aditya meets Shruthi at her farmhouse, where Aadyaa is hidden. Shruthi reveals that Rajeev wanted to kill Ria and arranged the attack on Sangeetha, after which Shruthi found Aadyaa in Sunny's custody. After meeting Aadyaa, Shruthi conspires to raise Aadyaa as her daughter because she had lost her own husband and unborn daughter in a car accident. Shruthi wanted to name her daughter Aadyaa, so when she saw Sangeetha's daughter, she convinced herself that her daughter has arrived.

Thus, Shruthi made a deal with Rajeev; Rajeev wanted Sangeetha to suffer so according to Shruthi's plan, he convinced his friends and family to pretend that Aadyaa never existed, saying Sangeetha cannot bear the shock of her daughter's death. Before Shruthi could kill Aditya, Loki shoots her after listening to the conversation on his way to the farmhouse with his subordinates. Rajeev is arrested and reveals that Aadyaa is not his daughter, as his medical report confirmed him sterile in the past. Then, Aditya reminces his last meeting with Sangeetha; she visited him to invite him to her wedding, and they make love. Aditya realises Aadyaa is his biological child. As he approaches Aadyaa, he sees a reflection of Sangeetha smiling at him.

== Cast ==
- Chiranjeevi Sarja as Aditya Shankar
- Sruthi Hariharan as ACP Sruthi Nayak
- Sangeetha Bhat as Sangeetha
- Ravishankar Gowda
- Shashank Purushotham as Rajeev
- Pramod Shetty
- Sujeeth Joseph

== Soundtrack ==
Aadya

Soundtrack album by Sridhar V Sambhram
- Genre: Feature film soundtrack
- Language: Kannada
- Label: Lahari Music
- Producer: T G Vishwaprasad, Raghunath S

The film's background score and the soundtracks are composed by Sridhar V Sambhram. The music rights were acquired by Lahari Music .

Tracklist
No.	Title	Lyrics	Singer(s)	Length
1.	"Neene Kaarana"	Rohith Padaki	Vijay Prakash
2.	"Jothe Jothe Saago"	Dhananjay Ranjan	Shashank Sheshagiri, Apoorva Sridhar
3.	"Mareyagi Nee"	Niranjan	Hemachandra, Anuradha Bhat
