= Kiss (2013 film) =

- Film poster
- Directed by: Adivi Sesh
- Written by: Adivi Sesh; Sai Kiran Adivi
- Produced by: Sai Kiran Adivi
- Starring: Adivi Sesh; Priya Banerjee
- Cinematography: Shaneil Deo
- Edited by: Abhinav Kunapareddy; Ravikanth Perepu
- Music by: Sricharan Pakala; Pete Wonder
- Release date: 12 September 2013
- Country: India
- Language: Telugu

Kiss is a 2013 Indian Telugu-language romantic comedy film directed by Adivi Sesh, who co-stars alongside Priya Banerjee.

== Cast ==
- Adivi Sesh as Sunny
- Priya Banerjee as Priya
- Chandra Adivi as Priya's father
- Shafi Moin as Murthy
- Bharath Reddy as Ravi
- Anand Batchu as Gopi
- Bhanu Yenamandra as Lakshmi
- RamKrishna Kondamudi as Mahesh
- Ujwal Kasthala as Kumar
- Veronica Valencia as Angela

== Soundtrack ==
KISS (Keep It Simple Stupid)

Soundtrack album by Sricharan Pakala
- Released: 2013
- Recorded: 2013
- Genre: Soundtrack
- Length: 41:48
- Label: Madhura Audio
- Producer: Sricharan Pakala

Sricharan Pakala chronology
KISS (Keep It Simple Stupid) (2013)	Kshanam (2016)

Music is composed by Sricharan Pakala and released on Madhura Audio label, while Pete Wonder composed two songs.

Track list
No.	Title	Lyrics	Singer(s)	Length
1.	"Pilla Baagundi"	Ravikanth Perepu	Pujan Kohli, Preethi Knight	03:16
2.	"Dochaavu Manase"	Chandra Adivi	Nithya Bayya (Composer: Pete Wonder)	03:26
3.	"Ee Kshanam"	Ravikanth Perepu	Ravikanth Perepu	04:08
4.	"Enno Navaraagaale"	Sirasri	Ravikanth Perepu	03:12
5.	"Premenaa"		Sulekha	04:46
6.	"Parugule"	Chakravarthula	Kousalya	03:28
7.	"Kissy Kiss"	Kavi 'REAL'	Kavi 'REAL' (Composer: Pete Wonder)	03:00
8.	"Golden Gate (Instrumental)"		Sricharan Pakala	1:39
9.	"Parichayam (Instrumental)"		Sricharan Pakala	0:56
10.	"Magic (Instrumental)"		Sricharan Pakala	00:36
11.	"Driving Miss Priya (Instrumental)"		Sricharan Pakala	1:36
12.	"Hero (Instrumental)"		Sricharan Pakala	02:06
13.	"Rakshana (Instrumental)"		Sricharan Pakala	02:46
14.	"Goodbye (Instrumental)"		Sricharan Pakala	1:23
15.	"Sun Rise (Instrumental)"		Sricharan Pakala	04:48
Total length:				41:48

== Critical reception ==
Kiss was rated 2.5 out of 5 stars by Rediff.com.
