= Jaideep Chopra =

Indian film director, producer and writer

Jaidep Chopra (born 1971) is an Indian film director, producer and writer.

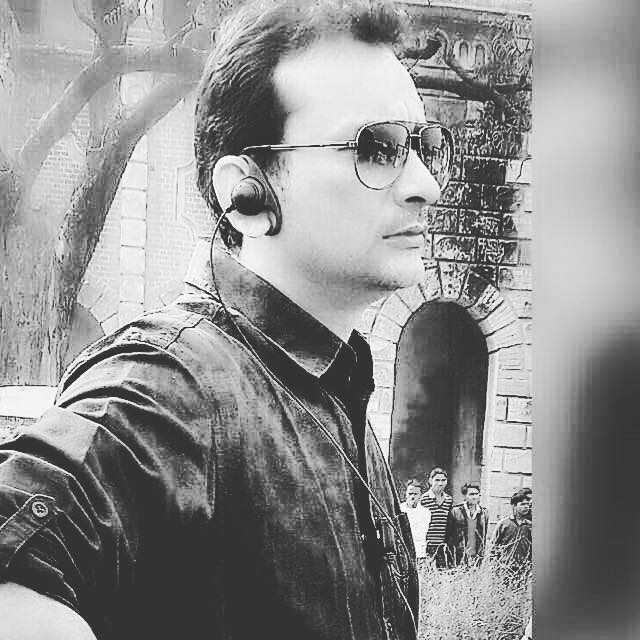
Jaidep Chopra

His first film, Maazii, was released in September 2013.

== Filmography ==
| Year | Film | Director | Executive Producer | Producer | Status |
|---|---|---|---|---|---|
| 27 September 2013 | Maazii | Jaideep Chopra | | Jaideep Chopra Productions | Released |
| 6 October 2017 | 2016 The End | Jaideep Chopra | | Jaideep Chopra Productions | Released |
| February 2018 | Life | Jaideep Chopra | | Jaideep Chopra Productions | On YouTube |
| May 2018 | Mangalsutra | Jaideep Chopra | | Jaideep Chopra Productions | Sent for Festivals |
| 2021 | Ktina | | Jaideep Chopra | Balaji Telefilms | Post Production |
| Year 2021–2022 | Sangeen | Jaideep Chopra | | Ak Projekts & Golden Era films | Post Production |
| 2023 | UTURN | | Jaideep Chopra | Balaji Telefilms | Released |
| 2024 | The Loose Noose | Vansh Chopra | | Jaideep Chopra Sanjay Laul | Festivals |
| 2024 | Kaleidoscope | Vansh Chopra | | Jaideep Chopra Sanjay Laul | Festivals |

== Career in telecommunication (1996-present) ==
Jaideep Chopra completed his schooling in New Delhi and later came to Mumbai to pursue engineering. Putting his education to use, he started his own small scale manufacturing plant and which over a span of six years churned out all kinds of electronic products ranging from doorbells to mobile phone chargers. From accessories, he entered the telecommunication industry on a full-fledged scale and became one of the first people to bring Chinese mobile phones to India and introduce inexpensive mobile phones to the masses.

He then partnered with the Chinese brand G'Five and with his support and effective marketing strategies, in 2010, G'Five mobiles became the second largest selling brand of mobile phones in India. Chopra has been publicly credited with the success of G'Five in India and was made the Vice President of G'Five International in this honor.

== Career in films (2012 – present) ==
Living Mumbai during his engineering college days, Bollywood held a charm for Chopra and he dreamt of being associated with the film industry from a very young age. Since he did not know anybody in the industry personally and did not see himself beginning at the grassroots level, he shelved his dream for a later day. He spent the next few years exploring and being established in the telecom industry.

Jaideep Chopra is an established director in India. He has directed two Hindi movies, 28 T.V commercials, two short films. In 2012-2013 he directed and co-produced his first film Maazii, written by Sumit Nijhawan and Shirish Sharma and co-produced and marketed by FilmyBox. Despite limited marketing and a small release, the film received great critical acclaim from film critics, and Chopra's work was compared to the "stylish thrillers of B.R. Chopra like Dhund and Ittefaq". Maazii was touted as the "shocking surprise of the season".

The film won several awards, such as Best Independent Movie of 2013 by IBN7 Live, the Award of Excellence at the Indian Cine Film Festival Los Angeles 2014, an honorable mention at Sunset Film Festival Los Angeles 2014, a special festive mention at the Indian Cine Film Festival 2014 Mumbai, an official selection at Dada Saheb Phalke Film Festival 2014 Delhi, and a nomination for best song in raga based category by Radio Mirchi.

In 2014 he was a part of the jury at Delhi International Shorts Film festival 2014. He was also Guest of Honour and Member of Jury at the Sixth Dada Saheb Film Festival held on 30 April 2016 in New Delhi.

2016 The End was his second project as a director and his first as a writer. The script of the film was his inspiration on living your life in present without the worries of tomorrow. The story of 2016 The End revolves around some friends who realise that the world will end in seven days and then they set out to fulfill their desires. It was a 2 hr 10 min Hindi comedy film which was released by PVR Pictures in October 2017 starring Harshad Chopda, Priya Banerjee, Divyendu Sharma and Kiku Sharda. The film received good critical acclaim and also received 2.5 to 3.5 star ratings.

His 2018 short movie Mangalsutra (The Symbol of Marriage) is based on a social cause to raise a voice against marital rape, which has been selected for many film festivals.

As of 2021, Jaideep Chopra has completed shooting of film Sangeen in london Starring Nawazuddin Siddiqui in Main lead along with Elnaz Norouzi from Sacred Games, and music By Raftar. The Film is Slated to Release in 2021.
