= Marielle Jaffe =

American actress, singer and model

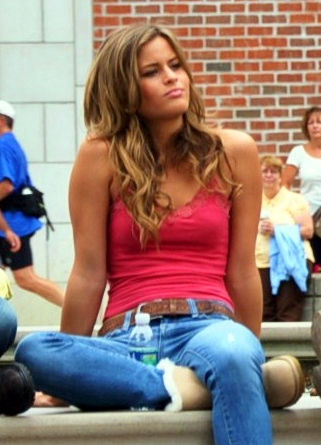
- Jaffe on set of Scream 4 in July 2010
- Born: Jaclyn Marielle Jaffe; Valencia, Santa Clarita, California, US
- Occupations: Actress, singer, model
- Years active: 2007–present
- Spouse: TK McKamy (m. 2014)

Jaclyn Marielle Jaffe is an American actress, singer and model.

In film, Jaffe had a lead ensemble role in What About Love (2024). She also had supporting roles in Scream 4 (2011) and Higher Power (2018). In television, Jaffe had a recurring role on the ABC Family series The Secret Life of the American Teenager (2012–2013).

== Filmography ==
=== Film ===
Year	Title	Role	Notes
2011	Scream 4	Olivia Morris	
2018	Higher Power	Rhea Steadman	
2024	What About Love	Tanner Tarlton	

=== Television ===
Year	Title	Role	Notes
2012–2013	The Secret Life of the American Teenager	Clementine	Recurring role; 12 episodes

=== Music videos ===
Year	Title	Artist(s)	Role	Ref.
2013	"Everybody Knows"	Dustin Tavella	The Girlfriend	
