= Ayesha Khanna =

Indian actress

- Born: New Delhi, India
- Occupations: Actress, Costume Designer
- Years active: 2014–present

Ayesha Khanna is an Indian bollywood film actress. She made her debut with Hindi film Dishkiyaoon.

She started her career as a costume designer before being spotted by Sanamjit Singh Talwar, the director of Dishkyaoon who offered her the lead opposite Harman Baweja.

== Filmography ==
- 2014 Dishkiyaoon
