= Priya Banerjee =

Canadian actress

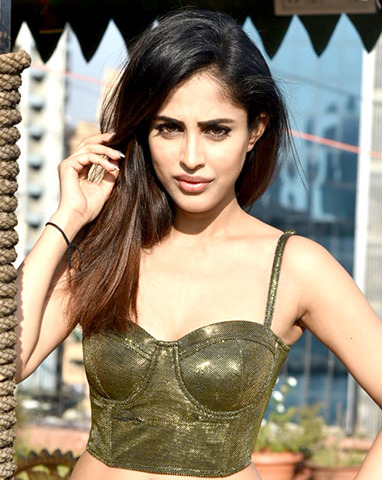
- Banerjee in 2019
- Born: 16 April 1992 (age 34); Calgary, Alberta, Canada
- Occupation: Actress
- Years active: 2013–present
- Spouse: Prateik Smita Patil (m. 2025)

Priya Banerjee (born 16 April 1992) is a Canadian actress who works primarily in the Indian movie industries. She has worked Hindi, Telugu films. Banerjee's first film was Kiss in Telugu in 2013, opposite Adivi Sesh. She then appeared in her second Telugu film, Joru, with Sundeep Kishan and Raashii Khanna as the other leads.

Priya Banerjee's latest release, MaayaKaMoh (2024), on ShemarooMe, has garnered significant global attention. Starring opposite Pankit Thakker, the film highlights their captivating on-screen chemistry, with Thakker's exceptional performance earning widespread critical acclaim.

== Personal life ==
Banerjee was born in Canada to parents of Indian Bengali origin and was raised in Canada. She participated in Miss World Canada 2011. On 14 February 2025, she married Prateik Smita Patil.

== Career ==
Banerjee started her career in 2013, with the Telugu film Kiss as Priya. In 2014, she acted in the film Joru as Annu. In 2015, she appeared in her third Telugu film, Asura as Harika opposite Nara Rohit.

In October 2015, Banerjee made her Bollywood debut with Sanjay Gupta's Jazbaa as Sia. The film starred Aishwarya Rai and Irrfan Khan however it failed at the box office and was declared a flop. In 2016, she acted in Karan Johar's Baar Baar Dekho, starring Sidharth Malhotra and Katrina Kaif.

In 2017, Banerjee started the year with 2016 The End, which released in the month of October, playing the main lead of Sheetal opposite Harshad Chopda. She later acted in T-Series's Dil Jo Na Keh Saka opposite Himansh Kohli as Sia. She also played Mrya in her third release of that year, Social.

In 2018, she acted in the film, Rain In 2019, she started the year with acting in the Tamil film Chithiram Pesuthadi 2. She made her web debut with ALT Balaji's Baarish in April 2019, starring Asha Negi and Vikram Singh Chauhan. She later returned to the series in season 2 in 2020. In May 2019, Banerjee played one of the leads as Kashti for Ekta Kapoor's Bekaaboo which aired on ALT Balaji opposite Rajeev Siddharth. In June 2019, Banerjee acted in Mahendra Bohra's thriller Bollywood film, Hume Tumse Pyaar Kitna opposite Karanvir Bohra.

Banerjee made her place in The Times Of India's "Most Desirable Women List" and was ranked at No. 22 in 2020.

== Filmography ==
Year	Film	Role	Language
2013	Kiss	Priya	Telugu
2014	Joru	Annu	Telugu
2014	Asura	Harika	Telugu
2015	Jazbaa	Sia	Hindi
2017	2016 The End	Sheetal	Hindi
2017	Dil Jo Na Keh Saka	Sia	Hindi
2017	Social	Myra	Hindi
2018	Rain	Barkha	Hindi
2019	Chithiram Pesuthadi 2	Nanditha	Tamil
2019	Hume Tumse Pyaar Kitna	Ananya	Hindi
2024	Chaalchitro	Joba	Bengali
2026	Candy and the Pizza Ggirl	Pizza Girl	Hindi

=== Web series ===
Year	Title	Role	Language	Platform	Ref.
2019	Baarish	Shreya	Hindi	ALT Balaji & ZEE5	
2019	Love Bites	—N/a	Hindi	ZEE5	
2019	Hello Mini	Ishita	Hindi	MX Player	
2019- 2021	Bekaaboo	Kashti	Hindi	ALT Balaji	
2020	8 Hours	—N/a	Telugu		
2020	Twisted 3	Myra Sinha	Hindi	JioCinema	
2020	Bhanwar	Kanika Makhija	Hindi	ZEE5	
2021	Jamai 2.0	—N/a	Hindi	ZEE5	
2021	11th Hour	Nora	Telugu	Aha	
2023	Rana Naidu	Mandira	Hindi / Telugu	Netflix	
2023	Adhura	Nancy	Hindi	Amazon Prime Video	
