= 2016 The End =

- Directed by: Jaideep Chopra
- Written by: Jaideep Chopra
- Produced by: Jaideep Chopra
- Starring: Harshad Chopda; Priya Banerjee; Divyendu Sharma; Kiku Sharda
- Cinematography: Karan B. Rawat
- Music by: Agnel Roman; Faizan Hussain
- Release date: 6 October 2017
- Country: India
- Language: Hindi

2016 The End is a 2017 apocalyptic Hindi comedy film written, produced and directed by Jaideep Chopra. It stars Harshad Chopda, Priya Banerjee, Divyendu Sharma and Kiku Sharda.

== Plot ==
Four friends living in Moradabad face different problems of their own. Sunny Shastri is lazy and spunky. His father nags him. Rahul is the son of a rich businessman. Swami Assemanand, as known as Asse, is the son of a self-proclaimed saint Swami Shraddhanand, but is dismissive of his father's beliefs and pursues interests such as KFC and Chicken 65. Sheetal lives with her parents and has an aggressive boss, who makes a move on her every other day. The four meet for a movie and discuss their lives. On their way home, they encounter a scientist, Dr. Bhama, who tells them the world is about to end as a giant meteorite is headed to destroy earth. First, they laugh it off, but believe him once they see it on his computer.

The next day, they are summoned by Inspector Pratap as Bhama is missing and was last seen with the four of them. They share their encounter with him, but Pratap does not believe them. It is night by the time they leave the police station and head to the nearest club. They decide to enjoy whatever is left of their lives. Sheetal sees Rahul with another girl named Sandy and gets jealous. She gets drunk and starts dancing in a frenzy. In their drunken state, they steal a red sports car. Next morning, they realize the car has 10 crore cash in it and they head to Goa.

On their way they encounter craziness as Sunny is almost wedded to a village girl, while Asse is caught up by a queen, who is a fan of Fifty Shades. They reach Goa and book the most expensive hotel. While in Goa, Rahul and Sheetal profess their love for each other while Asse and Sunny catch up.

When two days remain until the end, they head to the beach. They ride jet skis and para sails. They see a speedboat heading towards them and realize it is the man named Decosta from the party. He is a gangster and the money and car they stole was his. He keeps the girls hostage and orders them to return his money. They go to the police for help, but to no avail. Finally, they bring the remaining money to the meeting point. As the gangster is about to shoot them, Inspector Pratap rescues them and gives them a life lesson on how they should really appreciate life and be thankful for what they have. Weddings follow.

== Cast and characters ==
- Harshad Chopda as Rahul
- Priya Banerjee as Sheetal
- Divyendu Sharma as Sunny Shastri
- Kiku Sharda as Swami Assemanand aka Asse
- Narendra Jha as Police Inspector Pratap
- Supriya Karnik as Rani Sahiba
- Tom Alter as Dr. Bhama
- Jaideep Chopra as Riyaz
- Rahul Roy as Don Decosta
- Ashok Banthia as Swami Shraddhanand, Asse's Dad
- Susheel Parashar as Shastri, Sunny's Dad
- Ruben Israil as Rahul's Dad
- Karishma Kapoor as Priya, Rahul's stepmother
- Pankaj Arora as Sheetal's boss
- Mir Sarwar as Kashmeeri
- Reyhna Malhotra as Sandy, Rahul's fiancé
- Sonia as Rupa Chaudhary / Rupa Sunny Shastri
- Saleem Shiekh as Chuttan Kabari
- Surabhi Singhwal as Razia, Asse's love interest
- Tereza Fiserova as Illeana, Sunny's love interest

== Reception ==
=== Critical reviews ===
The Times of India gave the film a rating of 2.5 out of 5, with reviewer Reza Noorani describing 2016 The End as "an apocalyptic, goofball comedy" that offers some humorous moments, but they are "few and far between." He appreciated the comic chemistry between Sunny (Divyendu Sharma) and his father, and highlighted Kiku Sharda’s performance in an erotic-comedy scene as a standout.

IANS also rated the film 3 out of 5 stars, stating "It’s a bizarre idea in a film that breezes brazenly through a blizzard of bizarre incidents."

Amar Ujala rated the film 1 out of 5 stars, noting that the director tried to mix science, psychology, and comedy, but attempted to do too much at once. While the dialogues were witty and aimed at entertaining the audience, the film suffered from a loose script and could have benefited from tighter editing.
