= Joru =

- Theatrical release poster
- Directed by: Kumar Nagendra
- Written by: Kumar Nagendra
- Produced by: Ashok; Nagarjuna
- Starring: Sundeep Kishan; Raashii Khanna; Priya Banerjee; Sushma Raj
- Cinematography: M. R. Palani Kumar
- Edited by: M. S. Rajashekhar Reddy (S. R. Shekhar)
- Music by: Bheems Ceciroleo
- Production company: Sri Keerthi Films
- Release date: 7 November 2014
- Running time: 140 minutes
- Country: India
- Language: Telugu

Joru (transl. Vigor) is a 2014 Indian Telugu language romantic comedy film directed by Kumar Nagendra and produced by Ashok and Nagarjuna. Ram Pasupuleti worked as assistant director for this film. The film features Sundeep Kishan, Raashii Khanna, Priya Banerjee and Sushma Raj in lead roles. The music was composed by Bheems Ceciroleo. The film was released on 7 November 2014.

The film was later dubbed into Hindi as Izzat Ke Khatir and released on YouTube on 1 September 2018 by Pen Movies Company .

== Plot ==
Sundeep (Sundeep Kishan) bumps into NRI Annapoorna alias Anu (Raashi Khanna) during a road trip. As they go on, they are attacked quite a few times, and Sundeep finds out that she is the daughter of Sadasivam (Sayaji Shinde), the MLA of Vizag. Sundeep promises that he will safely drop her off with her father. The rest of the story shows Anu’s past, why they are being attacked, and what Sundeep has to do to save her.

== Cast ==
- Sundeep Kishan as Sundeep
- Raashii Khanna as Annapoorna "Anu"
- Priya Banerjee as Poorna
- Sushma Raj as Sruthi
- Brahmanandam as Pellikoduku "PK"
- Sayaji Shinde as MLA Sadasivan/Anu's father (Dual Role)
- Saptagiri as Namalu
- Ajay as Bhavani
- Prudhvi Raj as Sundeep's father
- Hema as Sruthi's mother
- Kasi Viswanath as Sruthi's father
- Annapoorna as Anu's grandmother
- Satyam Rajesh as Siddhartha Raju
- Fish Venkat as PK's assistant

== Soundtrack ==
The soundtrack of the film was composed by Bheems Ceciroleo. The soundtrack album consists of five songs, with lyrics by Sirivennela Seetharama Sastry, Vanamali and Bheems Ceciroleo. The eponymous track marks the singing debut of Raashii Khanna.

Joru

Soundtrack album by Bheems Ceciroleo
- Released: 6 October 2014
- Recorded: 2014
- Genre: Feature film soundtrack
- Length: 19:02
- Language: Telugu
- Label: Lahari Music
- Producer: Bheems Ceciroleo

Bheems Ceciroleo chronology
Galipatam (2014)	Joru (2014)	Ala Ela (2014)

Track listing
No.	Title	Singer(s)	Length
1.	"Manasa"	Sunil Kashyap	3:53
2.	"Puvvulaku Rangeyyala"	Shreya Ghoshal	4:26
3.	"Hawwai Thuvvai"	Hemachandra	4:10
4.	"Kodante Kodi"	Bheems Ceciroleo, Bhargavi Pillai	3:45
5.	"Joru"	Raashii Khanna	2:48
Total length:			19:02

== Reception ==
The Hindu gave a review and wrote that "Mindless fun can be entertaining when handled well. Joru is let down by incoherent writing and amateurish execution.". 123telugu gave a review rating of 2.5/5 and stated that "On the whole, ‘Joru’ ends up as just a below average entertainer. Too many characters and boring first half are the major drawbacks of the film. Sundeep Kishan and Raashi Khanna’s performance, climax, and Brahmi’s comedy are the only saving grace. You can only give this film a shot if you have absolutely nothing else to do". Times Of India gave 2/5 and stated that "At a run time of just around 140 minutes, the film makes you wonder if you have lost your sense of humour or if the joke is upon you".
