= Maazii =

2013 film by Jaideep Chopra

- Directed by: Jaideep Chopra
- Screenplay by: Sumeet Nijhawan; Shirish Sharma
- Produced by: Jaideep Chopra
- Starring: Sumeet Nijhawan; Mona Wasu
- Cinematography: Surjodeep Ghosh
- Edited by: Rameshwar S. Bhagat
- Music by: Faizan Hussain; Agnel Roman
- Production company: Jaideep Chopra Productions
- Release date: 27 September 2013
- Running time: 130 minutes
- Country: India
- Language: Hindi

Maazii (transl. Past) is a 2013 Indian film directed by Jaideep Chopra and produced by Jaideep Chopra and Narendra Singh. It is a remake of the 2005 English film A History of Violence.

== Cast ==
- Sumeet Nijhawan as Tarun Singh
- Mona Wasu as Shrishti Singh
- Manish Chaudhary as Gulab Singh
- Pankaj Tripathi as Satinder Rathi
- Mohammed Zeeshan Ayyub as Ashfaq
- Manav Kaushik as Satinder Bhati
- Zakir Hussain as Mahinder Singh
- Mukesh Rishi as Malhaan Singh (special appearance)
- Ashok Banthia as Satbeer Singh
- Devender Chaudhary as Rajinder Chaudhary
- Mohit Chauhan as Sushil Jain
- Pooja Bisht as Shanno
- Saanvi Sharma as Minal
- Vansh Chopra as Young Tarun

== Synopsis ==
Maazii is a thriller that travels from the hills of Mussoorie to the plains of western Uttar Pradesh. It is a story about a couple, Tarun (Sumit Nijhawan) and Shrishti (Mona Wasu) who have a near perfect relationship. However, by a twist of fate, an unfortunate accident occurs, which brings Tarun's life into the limelight and turns him into a hero overnight. The events that follow not only shatter the peaceful life of the family but also leave them in grave danger. When his daughter, Minal (Saanvi Sharma), is kidnapped at the hands of an unknown assailant, Tarun will go to any lengths to rescue her. He must return to his roots and find out who is creating havoc in his life and the motive behind it.

== Filming ==
The first half of the film was shot in the scenic locations of Mussourie and Dehradun, and the second half was mostly shot in the rustic and raw locations of Meerut. The flashback portion of the film was filmed in Rao Raj Vilas fort of Jat Jagirdar of Kuchesar, near Meerut. The shooting was completed within the pre-decided schedule of 31 days from 29 October to 2 November 2012. The production budget was around Rs. Four Crores.

== Release ==
The film was released across the country on 27 September 2013. However, being a debutorial venture without any big names attached to it, despite great critical acclaim, Maazii failed to get many screens. It was re-released in cinemas on 11 October 2013. In 2019, Maazii was released on Prime Video.

== Critical acclaim ==
Despite being Jaideep Chopra's debut directorial, Maazii received good critical acclaim and his work as a director was appreciated. Renowned critic Subhash K. Jha, called it "the shocking surprise of the season." He also stated that Maazii "takes us back to the stylish thrillers of B.R. Chopra like Dhund and Ittefaq. Debutant Jaideep Chopra's film is well-crafted and thoughtfully scripted. It's an original idea executed in a gripping language. Worth a dekko for its suspenseful aura."

Rohit Vats from IBN7 gave Maazii a rating of 4/5 stars and was all praises for the film. He claimed that Maazii shows "a glimpse of the latent potential of the gangster genre" and was "not to be missed" India Today's Faheem Ruhani mentioned in his review that "Director Jaideep Chopra's debut directorial Maazii is that pleasant surprise which hits you once in a while."

"Maazii" was also listed as one of the 10 "small films/non-star cast films that made it big" in 2013 in an article in DNA newspaper.

== Controversies ==
Despite good critic reviews, the film was not given many screens. In an interview, the producers of the film reported that several multiplex chains had demanded money in return for giving them shows. This led to a wave of controversy with several other producers and directors coming forward to claim that they had faced similar extortion at the hands of multiplex chains.

== Music ==
Maazii

Soundtrack album by Faizan Hussain-Agnel Roman
- Released: 27 September 2013
- Recorded: 2012–2013
- Genre: Feature film soundtrack
- Length: 24:52
- Language: Hindi
- Label: FilmyBox

The music score of the film was composed by the duo Faizan Hussain-Agnel Roman, Maazii being their first commercial film album. Faizan Hussain is the nephew of tabla maestro Ustad Zakir Hussain. Lyrics for the album were written by Swanand Kirkire and Arun Kumar. The preparation for the songs and selection of music started as early as May 2012. Recording of the songs began in October 2012.

The music album was launched on 30 August 2013.

Track listing
No.	Title	Singer(s)	Length
1.	"Maula"	Rahat Fateh Ali Khan,	4:59
2.	"Mora Jiya"	Rekha Bhardwaj	4:24
3.	"Zindagi"	Shalmali Kholgade, Nikhil Paul George	4:13
4.	"Totta"	Mika, Manjeera Ganguly	4:27
5.	"Mora Jiya Instrumental"	Niladri Kumar, Rakesh Chaurasiya	3:33
6.	"Totta Remix"	Mika, Manjeera Ganguly	3:18
Total length:			24:52

== Nominations and awards ==
Award	Category	Recipients and nominees	Outcome
IBN LIVE Film Awards	Best Independent Film 2013	Jaideep Chopra for Maazii	Won
Dada Saheb Phalke Film Festival 2014	Best Film Category	Jaideep Chopra for Maazii	Official Selection/Nomination
Sunset Film Festival Los Angeles 2014	Foreign Film Category	Jaideep Chopra for Maazii	Won "Honorable Mention"
Indie Film Fest California 2014	Foreign Independent Film Category	Jaideep Chopra for Maazii	Won "Award of Merit"
Indian Cine Film Festival 2014	Best Film Category	Jaideep Chopra for Maazii	Special Festival Mention
Radio Mirchi Music Awards	Best Raag Based Song 2013	Rekha Bhardwaj for Mora Jiya	Nominated
