= Scream 4 =

2011 American slasher film

- Theatrical release poster
- Directed by: Wes Craven
- Written by: Kevin Williamson
- Based on: Characters by Kevin Williamson
- Produced by: Wes Craven; Iya Labunka; Kevin Williamson
- Starring: David Arquette; Neve Campbell; Courteney Cox; Emma Roberts; Hayden Panettiere; Anthony Anderson; Alison Brie; Adam Brody; Rory Culkin; Marielle Jaffe; Erik Knudsen; Mary McDonnell; Marley Shelton; Nico Tortorella
- Cinematography: Peter Deming
- Edited by: Peter McNulty
- Music by: Marco Beltrami
- Production companies: Corvus Corax Productions; Outerbanks Entertainment
- Distributed by: Dimension Films
- Release dates: April 11, 2011 (TCL Chinese Theatre); April 15, 2011 (United States)
- Running time: 111 minutes
- Country: United States
- Language: English
- Budget: $40 million
- Box office: $97 million

Scream 4 (stylized as SCRE4M) is a 2011 American slasher film directed by Wes Craven and written by Kevin Williamson. Produced by Corvus Corax Productions and Outerbanks Entertainment, and distributed by Dimension Films, it is the sequel to Scream 3 (2000) and the fourth installment in the Scream film series. The film stars David Arquette, Neve Campbell, Courteney Cox, Emma Roberts, Hayden Panettiere, Anthony Anderson, Alison Brie, Adam Brody, Rory Culkin, Marielle Jaffe, Erik Knudsen, Mary McDonnell, Marley Shelton and Nico Tortorella. The film takes place on the fifteenth anniversary of the original Woodsboro murders from Scream (1996) and involves Sidney Prescott (Campbell) returning to the town after fifteen years, where Ghostface once again begins killing students from Woodsboro High. Like its predecessors, Scream 4 combines the violence of the slasher genre with elements of black comedy and "whodunit" mystery to satirize the clichés of film remakes. The film also provides commentary on the extensive usage of social media and the obsession with internet fame.

The series was originally intended to be a trilogy. However, in July 2008, the Weinstein Company, Dimension's owner, announced a fourth film was in development, with Craven confirmed to direct in March 2010. In September 2009, it was announced that Arquette, Campbell, and Cox were returning, after which the rest of the casting took place between April and September 2010. Principal photography began in June 2010 and ended in September that same year, taking place in and around Ann Arbor, Michigan. Scenes set around Woodsboro High School were filmed at Woodworth Middle School in Dearborn, Michigan. Ehren Kruger, who previously wrote the screenplay for Scream 3, was hired for script rewrites during production. Reshoots were filmed in early 2011, following test screenings.

Scream 4 premiered at the TCL Chinese Theatre in Los Angeles on April 11, 2011, and was released in the United States on April 15, 2011. The film received mixed reviews from critics at the time of release, earning praise for the performances, direction, and humor but criticism for the lack of scares and reliance on clichéd formulas. However, many considered it to be an improvement over its predecessor, and it has enjoyed several positive reappraisals since, particularly for its prescient examination of the negative impact of social media. It grossed $97 million worldwide on a budget of $40 million, becoming the lowest-grossing film in the Scream franchise.

Scream 4 was the final film to be directed by Craven before his death in 2015. It was followed by the anthology television series Scream (2015–2019), which was developed for MTV without the involvement of the main cast or crew of the films—although Roger L. Jackson, who provided the voice of Ghostface in the films, returned to voice Ghostface in the third season. A fifth film, Scream, was released on January 14, 2022, by Paramount Pictures.

== Plot ==
On the 15th anniversary week of the original Woodsboro murders, (Note: As depicted in Scream (1996)) high school students Marnie Cooper and Jenny Randall are murdered by Ghostface. Sidney Prescott returns to Woodsboro the following day to promote her self-help book with her publicist, Rebecca Walters. After evidence is found in her rental car, Sidney becomes a prime suspect in the murders and must stay in town until they are solved.

Sidney's teenage cousin, Jill Roberts, who is coping with the infidelity of her ex-boyfriend, Trevor Sheldon, gets a threatening phone call from Ghostface, as does her friend Olivia Morris. Jill and Olivia, alongside their friend Kirby Reed, are questioned about their calls by Dewey Riley, now the county sheriff, while his deputies Judy Hicks, Anthony Perkins, and Ross Hoss assist him in the case. Gale Weathers, Dewey's wife, is struggling with writer's block and decides to investigate the murders against her husband's wishes. That night, as Sidney stays over with Jill and her aunt Kate, Olivia is brutally murdered by Ghostface as Jill and Kirby watch in horror from across the yard. Sidney herself is then confronted by Ghostface, and they fight until Ghostface is forced to flee when Perkins and Hoss arrive.

At the hospital, Sidney fires Rebecca after learning of her desire to exploit the murders to increase book sales. Rebecca is subsequently murdered by Ghostface at a parking garage. Gale enlists the help of two high school cinephiles, Charlie Walker and Robbie Mercer. Charlie theorizes that the killer is following the rules of horror remakes, and Gale and Sidney conclude that the killer will likely strike at the "Stab-a-thon", a screening party held in a barn where teenagers gather to binge watch all seven installments of the Stab franchise. Gale sneaks into the party to investigate, but Ghostface attacks her, stabbing her in the shoulder. Hoss and Perkins, who were assigned to guard Jill's house, are also murdered. Sidney discovers through another taunting call from Ghostface that Jill has left for Kirby's, before Ghostface attacks her and Kate, killing the latter.

Jill, Kirby, Charlie, Robbie, and Trevor arrive for an after-party at Kirby's house when Ghostface strikes, killing a drunken Robbie. Sidney arrives to leave with Jill, but they are both chased by Ghostface. As Sidney calls Dewey and tries to find Jill, Kirby frees Charlie, who was bound and gagged, but he immediately stabs her, revealing himself as Ghostface before leaving her to bleed out. Sidney is confronted by Charlie and a second Ghostface, who reveals herself as Jill. She admits to masterminding the murders out of jealousy of the fame that Sidney received for surviving the previous killing sprees and desires to achieve notoriety as a pseudo-victim of the murders, intending to frame Trevor as Ghostface. Jill kills Trevor and betrays Charlie, stabbing him to death to pin him as Trevor's accomplice so she can be the sole survivor. She then stabs Sidney and injures herself to frame Trevor further.

Dewey and the police arrive and Sidney and Jill are taken to the hospital. After discovering that Sidney has survived, an enraged Jill goes to her hospital room and makes a final attempt to kill her. At the same time, Dewey and Gale deduce that Jill was one of the killers due to a comment she made about Gale's attack that was not public knowledge. Dewey, Gale and Judy rush to aid Sidney, but Jill subdues them. During the commotion, Sidney is able to electrocute Jill with a defibrillator and shoot her in the heart, finally killing her. As Dewey calls for backup, reporters outside erroneously name Jill as a "hero right out of the movies".

== Cast ==
- Neve Campbell as Sidney Prescott, a newly successful author who returns to Woodsboro and is targeted by a new Ghostface killer
- David Arquette as Dewey Riley, the sheriff of Woodsboro and Gale's husband
- Courteney Cox as Gale Weathers-Riley, a struggling writer and news anchor who is Dewey's wife and conducts a rogue investigation on the recent murders
- Emma Roberts as Jill Roberts, Sidney's cousin and Kirby's best friend
- Hayden Panettiere as Kirby Reed, Jill's best friend and a horror film fanatic
- Anthony Anderson as Anthony Perkins
- Adam Brody as Ross Hoss
- Rory Culkin as Charlie Walker, an avid horror fan
- Mary McDonnell as Kate Roberts, Jill's mother and Sidney's aunt
- Marley Shelton as Judy Hicks, the deputy sheriff who works alongside Dewey
- Alison Brie as Rebecca Walters, Sidney's publicist
- Marielle Jaffe as Olivia Morris, a friend of Jill and Kirby
- Nico Tortorella as Trevor Sheldon, Jill's ex-boyfriend
- Erik Knudsen as Robbie Mercer, a live streamer and avid horror fan
- Anna Paquin as Rachel in Stab 7
- Kristen Bell as Chloe in Stab 7
- Shenae Grimes as Trudie in Stab 6
- Lucy Hale as Sherrie in Stab 6
- Britt Robertson as Marnie Cooper
- Aimeé Teegarden as Jenny Randall
- Roger L. Jackson as the voice of Ghostface

== Production ==
=== Development ===
Scream 4 was announced by the Weinstein Company in July 2008, with Wes Craven saying that he would not mind directing the film if the script were as good as Scream. Kevin Williamson, the writer of Scream and Scream 2, confirmed his return in January 2010, stating that the fourth film's production would begin during the hiatus of his show The Vampire Diaries and that Craven would direct the film. In March 2010, it was confirmed that Craven would indeed direct.

In May 2010, Cathy Konrad, who produced the first three films in the series, filed a $3 million lawsuit against the Weinstein Company, alleging that they violated a written agreement that entitled her company, Cat Entertainment, first rights to produce all films in the series. The Weinsteins argued that this contract required Konrad's services be exclusive to the franchise, which Konrad calls "false pretext", claiming the previous film did not require this condition. The suit accused the Weinsteins of surreptitious behavior and "a scheme to force Plaintiffs to walk away from the Scream franchise without compensation," enabling them to cut costs by hiring someone else to produce (Craven's wife, Iya Labunka, not named in the suit). In April 2011, it was reported that the Weinsteins had settled out of court with Konrad, the details remaining confidential, though it was claimed that she would receive a cash payment plus a percentage of the profits from Scream 4.

=== Writing ===
Craven stated that there had been no "real life" Ghostface murders from between the decade time jump of Scream 3 to Scream 4 (Note: Scream (2022) reveals the fourth film occurs in its release year. Wes Craven refers to a ten-year time jump when the film was originally assumed to occur in 2010.) but that there had been numerous sequels to the film-within-a-film Stab. He also commented on the status of Sidney Prescott, "She's done her best to move on from the events that occurred in the previous films, even releasing a successful book". Craven said that endless sequels, the modern spew of remakes, film studios, and directors are the butts of parodies in the film. The main characters have to figure out where the horror genre is in current days to figure out the modern events happening to and around them. Williamson expressed his desire to tell a story in which the audience would really care about the characters, like Sidney Prescott, who survived the first three films, and focus on them rather than the next kill, in comparison to other horror films like those of the Saw franchise.

In an early draft of the script, Gale and Dewey had a baby, but this was changed after it was decided bringing a baby into the film would make shooting "impossible". In another early form of the script, the opening scene had Sidney start fighting with Ghostface and be left for dead. There would have been a two-year gap in the story while she recovered; however, Bob Weinstein feared it would slow the pace of the story and bringing in young characters would work out best.

There were numerous other differences between the original script and the version that eventually reached the screen. For instance, the opening sequences were changed around, as can be seen in the alternative versions and deleted scenes on the DVD. Also, the Stabathon and the sequences involving Gale being attacked there did not appear in the original script. Another major difference was the ending. The hospital finale scenes were added on later in the writing process. The original script ended at the house, with Jill being loaded into the ambulance and speaking to Dewey, then agreeing to give the photographers one photo under the pretense that they would then leave her alone (though she really wanted them to take her photograph). Just then, a paramedic from inside the house shouts that they have a woman alive, not specified but assumed to be either Sidney or Kirby. The film would have ended on this cliffhanger, presumably setting Jill up as an antagonist/anti-heroine in the next film. There were rumors that Sidney would then possibly be suffering from amnesia in the next film, unable to recall that Jill was the killer. There were also rumors that Williamson was upset that this ending was changed.

Scream 3 writer Ehren Kruger was brought in during production to do re-writes. Craven said, "Look, there was a bumpy period when things shifted over from Kevin to Ehren. I signed up to do a script by Kevin and unfortunately that didn't go all the way through the shooting. But it certainly is Kevin's script and concept and characters and themes". Additional rewrites were made by Paul Harris Boardman. It was reported that the actors were not given the 140-page script past page 75 in order to protect the identity of the Ghostface killer.

=== Casting ===
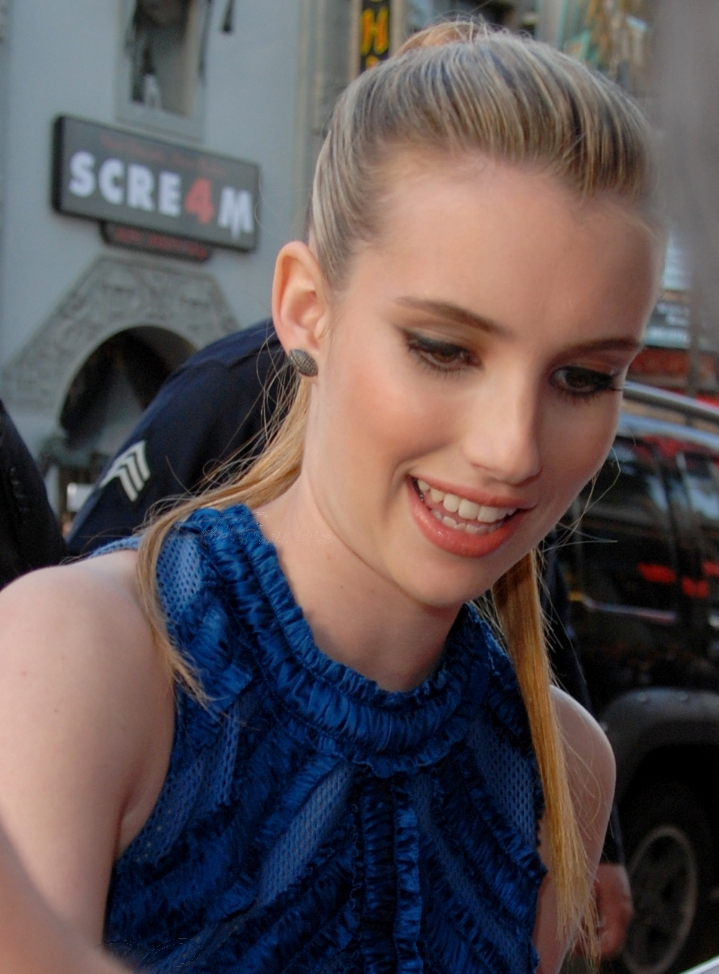
Emma Roberts at the film's premiere at the TCL Chinese Theatre

In September 2009, Variety reported that Neve Campbell, David Arquette, and Courteney Cox would return. Craven briefly explained their roles in a later interview with Entertainment Weekly, saying "It's a total integration of those three and new kids. The story of Sid, Gale, and Dewey is very much a part of the movie." At a press conference for Repo Men, Liev Schreiber—who played Cotton Weary in the first three films—stated there were no plans for his return. In an interview with FEARnet, Williamson continued to deny a rumor of Jamie Kennedy returning, stating, "I would love nothing more than to have Jamie Kennedy in the film. However to have Randy in the film, it sort of just takes it... I mean Scream 2 was a lie, you know? It's a false move. So I just won't do it. I can't do that. I just won't do it." In April, over 12 casting sides were released to the public to buy for auditions of the film. In May 2010, Hayden Panettiere and Rory Culkin signed on. Ashley Greene was offered the role of Sidney's cousin, Jill, but the role later went to Emma Roberts. Lake Bell was to play Deputy Judy Hicks, but dropped out four days before filming due to scheduling conflicts, causing the role to ultimately go to Marley Shelton. Nancy O'Dell reprises her role from the second and third films as a reporter. Roger L. Jackson returned as the voice of Ghostface. Lauren Graham was to play Kate Roberts, the mother of Roberts' character, but dropped out a few days into principal photography. Craven, like in the previous three films, has a cameo and took to his Twitter to ask fans to pick his role (the cameo was, however, deleted from the final cut of the film). The Hollywood Reporter reported that Anna Paquin and Kristen Bell have cameos in the beginning of the film akin to Drew Barrymore and Jada Pinkett Smith in the first and second films. Kristen Stewart originally declined the cameo role at the beginning of the film, as she thought she could not emulate Drew Barrymore. Shenae Grimes and Lucy Hale also have cameos in the film. In September 2010, Aimee Teegarden and Britt Robertson were cast as the film's actual opening roles, Jenny Randall and Marnie Cooper.

=== Filming ===
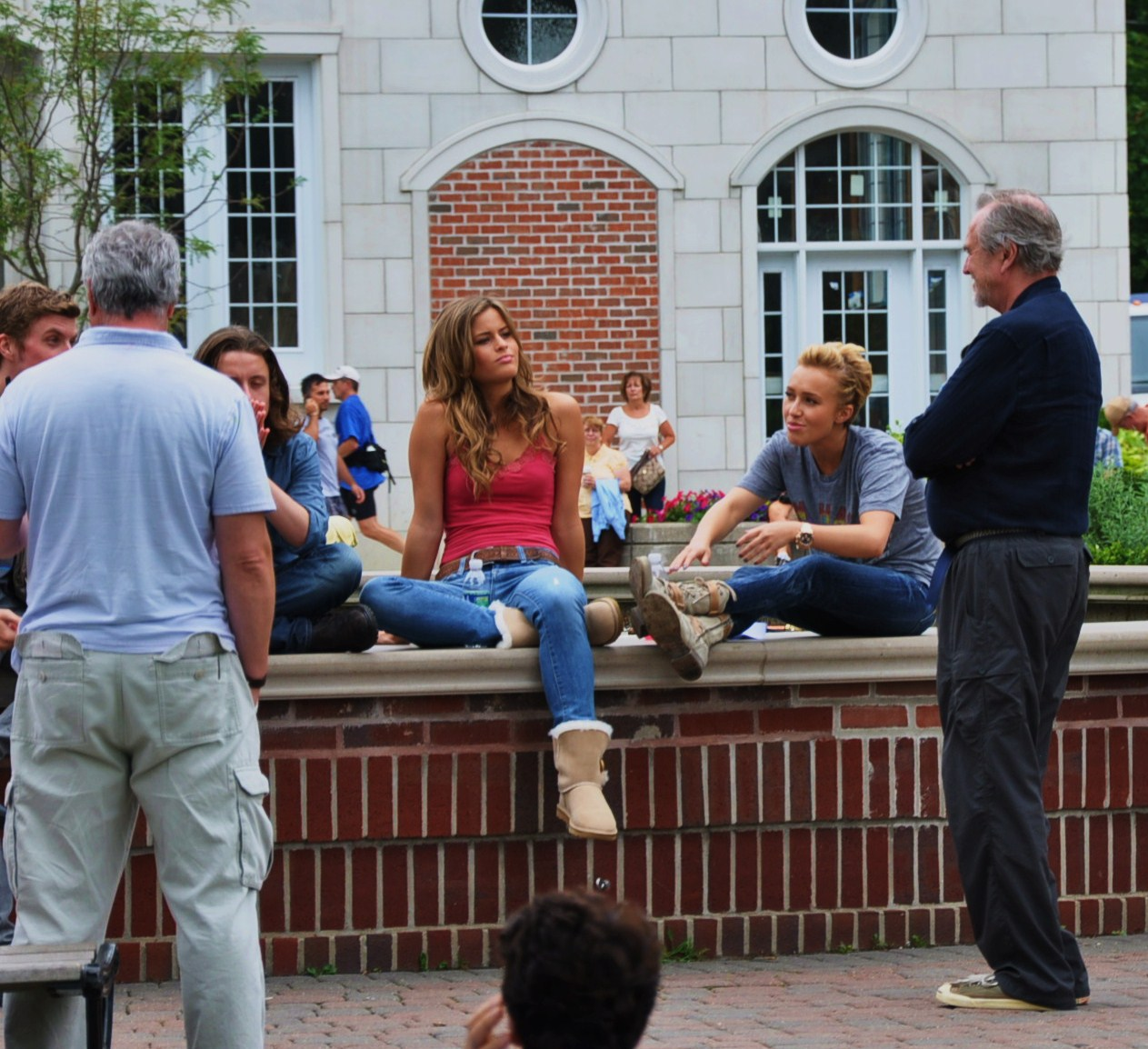
Filming taking place at Kellogg Park in Plymouth, Michigan, July 2010

On a budget of $40 million, principal photography began on June 28, 2010. Filming was scheduled to end on September 6, after a 42-day shoot, but instead concluded on September 24. Filming took place in and around Ann Arbor, Michigan. Scenes portraying Woodsboro High School featured in the original Scream film were shot at Woodworth Middle School in Dearborn, Michigan. The former 16th District Court in Livonia, Michigan was used as a police station.

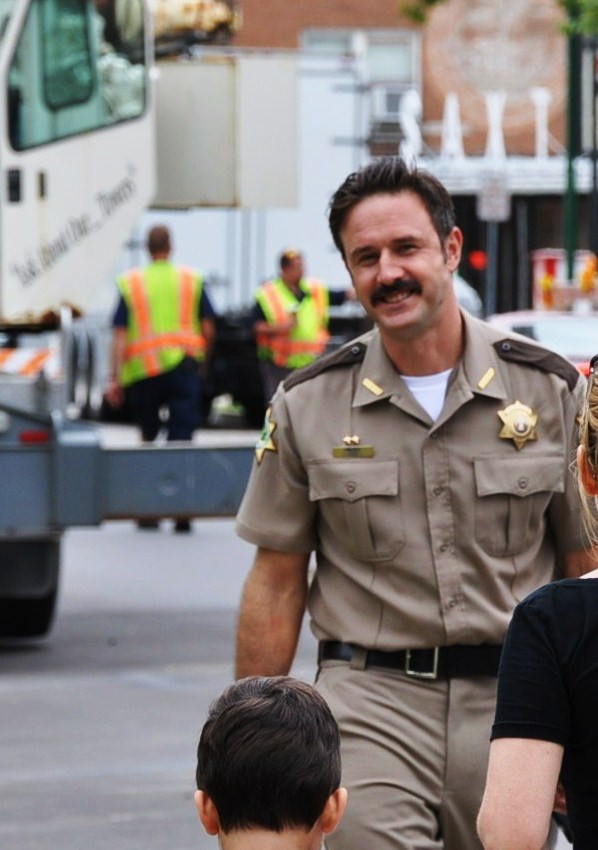
David Arquette as Dewey on set, July 2010

In April 2010, while scouting for a bookstore to use in the film, Craven spotted a new bookstore that had not yet opened in downtown Northville, Michigan, named Next Chapter Bookstore Bistro. Craven instantly loved the building as well as the name and decided to use both in the film. He also hired the owner's chef to prepare the food and pastry for a scene in the film. The scenes were shot the first week of July. After the test screening in January, Craven and Weinstein did not think the scenes played well for the audience. Aimee Teegarden and Alison Brie returned to Detroit in late January and early February 2011 for four days of additional shooting. The scenes involved Teegarden's character, who is stalked at her home, and Brie's character, who is attacked in a parking garage.

The film also extensively used computer-generated imagery for the first time in the franchise. For example, instead of using a "collapsing knife", the knife's blade was added during post-production with CGI effects. Anderson's death scene in which he is stabbed in the forehead and walks a few feet while talking before finally falling to his death, was not in the script but was inspired by a "real-life medical emergency" Craven had seen in a documentary about a person being stabbed through their head and walked into an emergency room. He thought it was "extraordinary if somebody was stabbed in the head and still be alive for a while". Craven also did not tell the studio that he was taking this approach for the death scene, jokingly saying he hoped he would not be fired the next day.

== Music ==
The Scream 4: Original Motion Picture Soundtrack was released on April 12, 2011, by Lakeshore Records. A score soundtrack was also released, on April 19, 2011, by Varèse Sarabande.

== Release ==
The film was released in North America on April 15, 2011.

=== Home media ===
Scream 4 was first released on DVD and Blu-ray in Mexico on August 5, 2011. To promote the DVD and Blu-ray release, Universal Studios produced "Terror Tram: SCRE4M For Your Life" as an event featured in its annual Halloween Horror Nights throughout September and October 2011. It was later released in the United Kingdom and Ireland on August 22, 2011, in Canada and the United States on October 4, 2011, and in Australia and New Zealand on October 13, 2011. Scream 4 entered the U.S. DVD and Blu-ray rental charts at #2 the week of its release. The film then spent 7 consecutive weeks among the top twenty of the chart. The film grossed $10.4 million in home sales. Scream 4 made its television debut on April 20, 2012, on cable channel Showtime. In December 2012, Showtime featured Scream 4 during a free weekend preview, where the station was available in over 80 million homes in America. On April 19, 2013, Scream 4 was added to Netflix's online streaming service. The film was released on Ultra HD Blu-ray by Lionsgate Home Entertainment, which owns the film via their 20% stake with distributor Spyglass Media Group, on June 9, 2026, with an additional limited edition VHS release.

== Reception ==
=== Box office ===
Scream 4 grossed $38 million in the United States and Canada, and $59 million in other territories, for a total gross of $97 million, against its budget of $40 million.

The film was released in 3,305 theaters on 4,400 screens and grossed over $1 million in its midnight previews. It made $8.7 million on Friday and $19.3 million in its opening weekend, finishing second at the box office. According to industry experts, the film's opening weekend was "disappointing," experiencing the third-lowest opening of the Scream franchise. In its second weekend, it fell to fifth place, taking in $7 million ($7.8 million over the four-day Easter frame), then $2.2 million in its third weekend.

In its first weekend worldwide the film took $37.3 million from 30 territories, behind only Rio which took $53.9 million from 62 territories. The film topped the box office in the United Kingdom taking over £2 million, came in second in France, third in Mexico and fourth in Australia.

=== Critical response ===
On review aggregator Rotten Tomatoes, the film holds an approval rating of 61% based on 190 reviews, with an average score of 5.8/10. The website's critical consensus reads, "The franchise is showing its age, but Scream 4 is undeniably an improvement over its predecessor, with just enough meta humor and clever kills." On Metacritic, the film received a weighted average score of 52 out of 100 based on 32 critics, indicating "mixed or average reviews". Audiences polled by CinemaScore gave the film an average grade of "B−" on an A+ to F scale.

Roger Ebert gave the film two out of four stars, criticizing the film for using the clichéd formula of the slasher genre, but complimenting Craven's direction and Williamson's dialogue. Empire gave the film two out of five stars, criticizing the film's old-fashioned formula and lack of scare factor. The New York Daily News thought the film was "dated" and that "relying on obvious clichés doesn't seem ironic anymore, just easy." The Toronto Sun gave the film a mixed review, writing that "this installment is nowhere near the hip, serrated-edge blast of newness the original was in 1996. Suddenly, it's the horror thriller that, like, your parents are excited about"; however, the review praised director Wes Craven. Colin Covert of the Minneapolis Star Tribune gave the film a perfect score of four out of four stars, praising the combination of scares, comedy, and twists.

The Boston Herald wrote that the film is "often amusing" but too long. Lisa Kennedy from the Denver Post stated that Scream 4 "pays plenty of homage to their 1996 original", but that it is not close to its greatness, despite calling it a "cut above most slasher flicks". Lisa Schwarzbaum of Entertainment Weekly praised the film, stating "It's a giddy reminder of everything that made Scream such a fresh scream in the first place", while Betsy Sharkey of the Los Angeles Times wrote that "Scream 4 finds a way to live up to its gory past while it carves out new terrors in new ways." Peter Travers of Rolling Stone gave the movie two out of four stars, criticizing the comedic overtones.

In the years since its release, many have credited Scream 4 with foreshadowing the effects of social media on today's youth and the extreme lengths to which they go to achieve internet fame.

=== Accolades ===
In June 2011, Scream 4 was nominated for a Teen Choice Award for Best Horror Movie but lost to Paranormal Activity 2. On March 2, 2012, Scream 4 won the award for Best Horror Movie, and Ghostface came in third place for Best Villain at the Virgin Media Movie Awards.

== Sequel ==
Prior to the release of Scream 4, Wes Craven and Kevin Williamson both stated that its success would lead to a fifth and sixth film. Williamson stated in January 2010 that he was contracted to write a fifth film in addition to the fourth one. Following the underperformance of the film at the box office, as well as the death of Craven in 2015, doubts were cast on the possibility of future films. In 2015, MTV began airing an anthology television series spin-off of the franchise, although none of the cast or crew from the films were involved. Although star Neve Campbell has expressed doubts over any more installments, David Arquette voiced his desire to have a fifth film to pay homage to Craven.

In November 2019, it was reported that Spyglass Media Group was making a new installment in the franchise. Kevin Williamson was to return as an executive producer, but it was unknown if any of the three main cast members (Neve Campbell, Courteney Cox, and David Arquette) would return.

In March 2020, it was announced that Matt Bettinelli-Olpin and Tyler Gillett would direct the movie, with Kevin Williamson producing, and that it had already entered official development, with filming intended to begin in May 2020. That same month, it was announced that David Arquette would be reprising his role of Dewey Riley for the fifth film and James Vanderbilt and Guy Busick were announced as additional writers. In July 2020, it was also confirmed that Courteney Cox would reprise her role of Gale Weathers in the sequel. In September 2020, it was confirmed that Neve Campbell and Marley Shelton would reprise their roles as Sidney Prescott and Judy Hicks, respectively.

Scream was theatrically released in the United States on January 14, 2022, by Paramount Pictures.
