= Higher Power (film) =

2018 film by Matthew Charles Santoro

- Directed by: Matthew Charles Santoro
- Written by: Julia Fair; Matthew Charles Santoro
- Produced by: Lorenzo di Bonaventura; Evan Cholfin; Ross M. Dinerstein; Greg Siegel
- Starring: Ron Eldard; Jordan Hinson; Austin Stowell; Marielle Jaffe; Jade Tailor; Colm Feore
- Cinematography: Dallas Sterling
- Edited by: Sarah Broshar; Saul Herckis; Matthew Santoro
- Music by: Kevin Riepl
- Production companies: Break Media; Campfire; Di Bonaventura Pictures
- Distributed by: Magnet Releasing
- Release date: May 11, 2018 (Bainbridge Island)
- Running time: 93 minutes
- Country: United States
- Language: English
- Budget: $500,000
- Box office: $528

Higher Power is a 2018 science fiction action thriller film directed by Matthew Charles Santoro. It is about an ordinary man faced with the task of saving the world from destruction. It was released on May 11, 2018. It stars Jordan Hinson, Ron Eldard, Austin Stowell, Jade Tailor, Marielle Jaffe, Tom Wright and Colm Feore

== Story ==
The world is at risk and it's up to one man to save it. A mad scientist has to go through the DNA of the population of earth to find someone to do the job. The needed hero turns out to be a former alcoholic called Joe who has an anger problem and two estranged daughters called Zoe and Rhea. Joe then finds himself in the hands of the mad scientist. The experimental work that the scientist does on Joe equips him with some kind of electromagnetic power that could either save the world or destroy it.

== Cast ==
- Ron Eldard as Joe Steadman
- Jordan Hinson as Zoe Steadman
- Austin Stowell as Michael
- Colm Feore as Control
- Jade Tailor as Heather Steadman
- Winston James Francis as Tele
- Marielle Jaffe as Rhea Steadman
- Tom Wright as Tom Davis the Talk Show Host
- Mei Melançon as Ms. Sabi
- Laura Margolis as Rebecca
- Richard Portnow as Charles Margrey
- Omar Doom as Dario
- Linc Hand as Officer Smith
- Exie Booker as Rogers
- Tony Nevada as Field Agent
- Benjamin John Parrillo as Detective
- Michelle Laine as Drugged-Out Girl
- Richard Dorton as Field Agent #4
- David Preston as Jeremy
- Fitz Houston as Frank
- Adam Budron as Actor

== Production and release ==
Director Matthew Charles Santoro had previously worked on Aliens vs. Predator: Requiem, Fantastic Four: Rise of the Silver Surfer and the X-Men films (X-Men Origins: Wolverine and X-Men: The Last Stand), as a visual artist. Higher Power was his directorial debut.

It opened at Bainbridge Cinemas at the Pavilion Mall in Bainbridge Island, Washington, on May 11, 2018.
