= Dishkiyaoon =

2014 Indian Hindi-language crime action film

- Theatrical release poster
- Directed by: Sanamjit Singh Talwar
- Written by: Sanamjit Singh Talwar
- Produced by: Sunil Lulla; Shilpa Shetty Kundra
- Starring: Sunny Deol; Harman Baweja; Ayesha Khanna; Aditya Pancholi; Prashant Narayanan; Anand Tiwari; Sumit Nijhawan; Hasan Zaidi
- Cinematography: Axel Fischer
- Edited by: Rameshwar S. Bhagat
- Music by: Songs: Sneha Khanwalkar; Palash Muchhal; White Noise; Score: Julius Packiam
- Production companies: Essential Sports & Media
- Distributed by: Eros International
- Release date: 28 March 2014
- Running time: 119 minutes
- Country: India
- Language: Hindi
- Budget: ₹3.90 crore
- Box office: ₹6.88 crore

Dishkiyaoon (transl. Sound of a bullet) is a 2014 Indian Hindi-language crime action film written and directed by debutant Sanamjit Singh Talwar, and produced by Sunil Lulla and Shilpa Shetty Kundra. The film features Sunny Deol, Harman Baweja, debutant Ayesha Khanna, Aditya Pancholi and Prashant Narayanan in the lead roles. The storyline is based on the Mumbai underworld. Originally set to be released on 10 January 2014, the film experienced delays and was eventually released on 28 March 2014.

== Plot ==
Dishkiyaoon’s story is about a mentor and his protege. The plot is presented as a narrative told by Viki, a young man who grows up on the streets of Mumbai. Viki is ambitious and wants to make a name for himself. He gets involved with a local gang led by Tony, but soon gets disillusioned by their small-time operations. He is drawn to the more organized and dangerous world of the big-time gangsters.

This is where Lakwa comes into the picture. Lakwa is a legendary figure in the Mumbai underworld, known for his cold-blooded efficiency and his quiet, brooding demeanor. Viki is fascinated by him and sees him as the ultimate example of what a gangster should be. Viki tries to get Lakwa to notice him, and eventually, Lakwa takes him under his wing.

Lakwa becomes Viki's mentor, teaching him the rules of the game, the intricacies of the underworld, and the philosophy of a gangster's life. He advises Viki on when to be ruthless and when to show restraint. He teaches him that in this world, trust is a luxury and betrayal is a constant threat. Lakwa's character is not just about violence; he also has a sense of melancholy and regret, hinting at a past that has made him the way he is.

The relationship between Viki and Lakwa is the core of the film. It's a mentorship that evolves into a father-son-like bond. Viki, with Lakwa's guidance, rises through the ranks of the underworld, becoming a formidable figure himself. However, this rise comes with a cost. The film explores themes of ambition, loyalty, betrayal, and the cyclical nature of violence. Lakwa's story is not just as a mentor but as a tragic figure whose life and actions serve as a cautionary tale for Viki.

The climax of the film revolves around a series of betrayals and power struggles, with both Lakwa and Vicki’s lives being put in danger. The story ultimately concludes with a twist that reveals the true nature of the relationship between the characters and the ultimate price of a life of crime.

== Cast ==
- Sunny Deol as Lakwa
- Harman Baweja as Viki Kartoos
- Ayesha Khanna as Meera
- Aditya Pancholi as Nawab Khan
- Rajesh Vivek
- Harsh Chhaya
- Prashant Narayanan as Mota Tony
- Anand Tiwari as Rocky Chu
- Sumeet Nijhawan as Iqbal Khalifa
- Hasan Zaidi as Ketan
- Shilpa Shetty Kundra (special appearance) as Dancer (in the song "Mere Type Ka Nahi")
- Nataša Stanković as Jiya

== Production ==
The film was shot in Mumbai and Europe. The first look of the film was released on 14 October 2013.

== Music and Soundtrack ==
The music for the film's songs was composed by Sneha Khanwalkar and debutant Palash Muchhal. The lyrics of the songs were penned by Sanamjit Singh Talwar. The background score of the film was done by Julius Packiam. The album also contains a remix sung by Arijit Singh and Altamash Faridi.

Track listing
No.	Title	Lyrics	Music	Artist(s)	Length
1.	"Tu Mere Type Ka Nahi Hai"	Mayur Puri	White Noise Productions	Kunal Ganjawala, Bonnie Chakraborty & Gayatri Iyer	4:21
2.	"Tu Hi Hai Aashiqui" (Solo)	Sanamjit Singh Talwar	Palash Muchhal	Arijit Singh	5:12
3.	"Nachle Tu"		Palash Muchhal	Mika Singh, Palak Muchhal	4:43
4.	"Tutey"		Sneha Khanwalkar	Sukhwinder Singh	4:38
5.	"Tu Hi Hai Aashiqui" (Duet)	Sanamjit Singh Talwar	Palak Muchhal	Arijit Singh & Palak Muchhal	4:58
6.	"Nissar"		Sneha Khanwalkar	Vishal Dadlani & Sneha Khanwalkar	4:45
7.	"Tu Hi Hai Aashiqui" (Remix)	Sanamjit Singh Talwar	Palash Muchhal	Arijit Singh & Altamash Faridi	2:46
Total length:					42:27

== Reviews ==
Shubhra Gupta of The Indian Express gave it a 0.5 rating out of a maximum possible five. Parmita Uniyal of Hindustan Times gave a negative review writing, "Go for Dishkiyaoon only if you have nothing interesting to do this weekend." News18 gave the film 2 out of5, calling it "Unintentionally hilarious."
