= Sumit Nijhawan =

Indian actor

- Born: (Meerut)
- Occupations: Actor and writer
- Years active: 2004 onwards
- Known for: Begum Jaan, Raja Natwarlal, Dishkiyaaoon, Maazii, Phas Gaye Re Obama, Contract, Sarkar Raj, Jannat 2, Jism 2, Mardaani 2, Lootcase, Blurr

Sumit Nijhawan (born 28 December 1978) is an Indian actor residing in Mumbai, India. Nijhawan has appeared in films such as Contract, Sarkar Raj and Phas Gaye Re Obama. He also played Sarfaraz, a prominent character in the movie Jannat 2, where he made his presence felt. His first role as a main lead came with Maazii, which received the IBN Live Best Independent Film 2013 award. He has since played substantial roles in films like Dishkiyaaoon, Raja Natwarlal and Vidya Balan starrer Begum Jaan where his role received significantly appreciation. His performance in Mardaani 2, an action thriller starring Rani Mukherji, and Lootcase, a FOX India film, received rave reviews from critics.

He will soon be seen in Blurr, starring Taapsee Pannu, scheduled to be released in December 2022.

== Early life and education ==
Nijhawan was born and brought up in Meerut and holds a Masters in International Business from the Delhi School of Economics. He has modelled for brands like Mitsubishi, Globus, Vitara and Larsen & Toubro.

== Career ==
Sumit Nijhawan made his debut in Bollywood in 2004 with Girlfriend. His second film was Jackie Shroff's Tum... Ho Na! in 2005, which was followed by Ram Gopal Varma's Aag in 2007 and Sarkar Raj (2008). He also played the role of RD in Ram Gopal Varma's Contract and received appreciation for his performance. In 2010, his portrayal of Ali in multi-starrer Phas Gaye Re Obama, won him much critical acclaim. Nijhawan was then seen in Jannat 2 in 2012, where he played one of the main negative characters, Sarfaraz, and left quite an impact on the audience with his performance. He was also seen in Mahesh Bhatt's Jism 2 where he played the role of Randeep Hooda's friend and confidant.

He played his first lead role in the film Maazii, produced and directed by newcomer Jaideep Chopra. Though the film saw a limited release, it received great critical acclaim. It received a Special Mention in the Indian Cine Film Festival 2014. It was also the official Best Foreign Film nomination at Sunset Film Festival, L.A, and Indie Film Festival, California, where it won an "Honorable Mention" and an "Award of Merit" respectively. Faheem Ruhani of India Today praised Sumit's performance saying he "plays the lead protagonist with the subtlety that is required of him. He portrays restrained anger with the indomitable spirit of a hero". Film critic Subhash K. Jha called Maazii the "shocking surprise of the season" and stated that the lead was "a complex role which Sumit Nijhawan plays with stoicism and smothered anger which works fine for the character." IBN Live's review by Rohit Vats emphasized that Sumit's "body language separates him from the superheroes we see in usual Hindi films" and that "this works amazingly in his favor."

Post-Maazii, Sumit was seen in a substantial role in Shilpa Shetty's home production Dishkiyaoon where he played a gangster, Iqbal Khaleefa, and gave "an implosive performance that ignites the frames". Though the film as a whole did not work commercially and the lead protagonist was weak, Sonia Chopra, a critic for Sify wrote that "the talented supporting cast – Prashant Narayanan, Anand Tiwari and Sumit Nijhawan among others— salvaged the film." The review in Hindustan Times mentioned that Khaleefa, as a "character artist stood out" and though Taran Adarsh was critical of the film, he approvingly wrote that Sumit "played the bad guy without much effort.".

His role as the cop, Mr. Singh, in the Emraan Hashmi starrer Raja Natwarlal received a lot of appreciation. As Raja Sen of Rediff wrote, he had "a solid, menacing presence as a bad cop." Vishal Verma of IndiaGlitz wrote "Sumit Nijhawan as a greedy cop is fantastic" and Subhash K. Jha said that Nijhawan was "brilliant as a corrupt cop." Renowned film critic Komal Nahta mentioned in his blog review that Nijhawan provided "terrific support". Sweta Kaushal of Hindustan Times appreciated Sumit's performance saying, "Sumit Nijhwan, who plays a corrupt cop, fits the bill perfectly and the lusty, evil look he has on his face each time he talks to Humaima just hits the nail."

The film Begum Jaan where he played the strapping Pathan guard to Vidya Balan, got him rave reviews, with Hindustan Times calling him a worthy partner to her One publication referred to his role as a throwback to Om Puri's role in Mirch Masala, with shades of Govind Nihalani's Tamas and Vinay Shukla's Godmother.

He was also seen in Mardaani 2, a sequel of Rani Mukherji's 2014 movie Mardaani. Critics lauded his role as Brij Shekhawat, a jealous senior cop who couldn't stand the success of a woman officer in his department. Vishal Verma, journalist and movie critic, stated that Sumit left a mark with his marvellous performance. Mayank Shekhar felt Nijhawan had been finely hand-picked for the role and senior critic Komal Nahta pointed out that Sumit made his presence felt in his role.

His performance as Omar Siddiqui in Lootcase, received appreciation from critics and audience alike. His next film, Blurr is scheduled to be released in late 2022.

== Personal life ==
Nijhawan lives in Mumbai and also enjoys writing and directing.

== Filmography ==
Year	Film	Role
2004	Girl Friend	
2005	Tum... Ho Na!	
2007	Aag	
2008	Sarkar Raj	Bala
2008	Contract	RD
2010	Phas Gaye Re Obama	Ali
2012	Jannat 2	Sarfaraz
2012	Jism 2	Sumit
2013	Maazii	Tarun
2014	Dishkiyaaoon	Iqbal Khaleefa
2014	Raja Natwarlal	Inspector Singh
2017	Begum Jaan	Saleem
2019	Mardaani 2	DSP Brij Shekhawat
2020	Lootcase	Omar
2022	Blurr	Mahendre Singh Chandel
2026	Taskaree	Anna

== As a Writer ==
Year	Film	Co-Writer	Producer
2012-13	Maazii	Shirish Sharma	Jaideep Chopra, Narendra Singh
