= What About Love (film) =

2024 film directed by Klaus Menzel

- Release poster
- Directed by: Klaus Menzel
- Written by: Klaus Menzel; Douglas Day Stewart
- Produced by: Klaus Menzel; Nitsa Bechetrit; Sara Fijo; George Lascu; Bill Sloan
- Starring: Miguel Muñoz; Marielle Jaffe; Sharon Stone; Andy Garcia
- Cinematography: Reinhart Peschke
- Edited by: Paul Forte; Daniel Lawrence
- Music by: Pieter Schlosser
- Production companies: Eggplant Pictures; Quality Films; Accident Films; Gondola Films; Rex Media
- Distributed by: XWS
- Release date: February 14, 2024
- Running time: 114 minutes
- Countries: Italy; Romania; Spain; United States
- Languages: English; Spanish
- Budget: $30 million

What About Love is a 2024 romantic drama film directed by Klaus Menzel from a screenplay by Menzel and Douglas Day Stewart. It stars Marielle Jaffe, Miguel Ángel Muñoz, Sharon Stone, Andy García.

== Plot ==
Tanner Tarlton (Marielle Jaffe) is the daughter of affluent American parents Linda and Peter Tarlton. Tanner, feeling stifled by her parents' strained relationship and their expectations, embarks on a summer trip to Europe to create a documentary exploring people's attitudes toward love. In Spain, she meets Christian Santiago, a passionate and introspective young man from a different cultural background. Despite their initial differences, Tanner and Christian find common ground in their skepticism about love, stemming from personal experiences and familial influences.

As they travel across picturesque European locales, interviewing various individuals about their experiences with love, Tanner and Christian's own relationship begins to blossom. Their shared journey becomes a mirror reflecting their evolving feelings, and they soon realize they're documenting their own love story.

However, tragedy strikes when a severe accident leaves Tanner critically injured and Christian with a concussion, leading to memory loss. The documentary they created becomes a vital tool in helping Christian recover his memories and understand the depth of their bond. Simultaneously, Tanner's parents, Linda and Peter, are forced to confront their own fractured relationship. Witnessing their daughter's journey and the profound impact of her love story compels them to reevaluate their own choices and the possibility of rekindling their connection.

== Cast ==
- Sharon Stone as Linda Tarlton
- Andy Garcia as Peter Tarlton
- Iain Glen as American Ambassador
- Rosabell Laurenti Sellers as Young Girl
- José Coronado as Rafael Santiago
- Maia Morgenstern as Sister Martina
- Marielle Jaffe as Tanner Tarlton
- Miguel Ángel Muñoz as Christian Santiago
- Caroline Morahan as TV Host
- Kamaliya as Angelica

== Release ==
What About Love was scheduled on February 14, 2020, but it was delayed to September 25, 2020, and then to February 12, 2021, but delayed again due to the COVID-19 pandemic. It had a limited theatrical release on February 14, 2024, and seems to have been made available on Plex on February 14, 2026; however, as of June 7th 2026, there is still no way to watch the full movie on Plex.
