= Ragada =

2010 film by Veeru Potla

- Theatrical release poster
- Directed by: Veeru Potla
- Written by: Veeru Potla
- Produced by: D. Siva Prasad Reddy
- Starring: Nagarjuna Akkineni; Anushka Shetty; Priyamani; Dev Gill
- Cinematography: Sarvesh Murari
- Edited by: Marthand K. Venkatesh
- Music by: S. Thaman
- Production company: Kamakshi Movies
- Release date: 24 December 2010
- Running time: 136 min
- Country: India
- Language: Telugu
- Box office: ₹18.15 crores distributors' share

Ragada (transl. Friction) is a 2010 Indian Telugu-language action comedy film directed by Veeru Potla and produced by D. Siva Prasad Reddy. It stars Nagarjuna, Anushka Shetty, Priyamani and Dev Gill in lead roles, with the music composed by S. Thaman. In the film, Satya leaves his village and arrives in Andhra Pradesh to earn money and willingly participates in a fight between two rivals that brings him to their attention.

Ragada was released theatrically on 24 December 2010 to positive reviews from critics and audiences and went on to become a commercial success grossing over ₹38 crores at the box office with a distributor's share of ₹18.15 crores. In 2011, it was dubbed and released into Tamil as Vambu. The same year, it was dubbed in Hindi under the same name.

== Plot ==
Devudu attempts to kill an innocent man, who is against Peddanna, but is killed by one of Peddanna's followers Jairam. Peddanna is the famed gangster in Andhra Pradesh, and has three major followers who murder people for him. These followers are Jairam, Bhagavan and Nanda. Meanwhile, Satya Reddy is a money-minded man who gets involved in a fight between GK and Peddanna. Satya helps GK, who makes him as his partner, where GK's love interest Sirisha falls in love with Satya. Satya sees Ashtalakshmi being chased by goons where he saves her. Ashtalakshmi and her Brahmin family starts living with Satya for a few days. Satya makes up a plan for GK to fight Peddanna. In one fight, Jairam captures Sirisha, and Satya saves her by killing Jairam. Ashtalakshmi also loves Satya. Sirisha meets a tattooed friend in the pub which Satya notices. In a restaurant during lunch with Sirisha and Ashtalakshmi, Satya is attacked by Bhagavan's henchmen. Satya goes to Bhagavan's house and kills him and his father, which enrages Peddanna. Then Satya remembers his past.

Past: Satya was an orphan who is taken care by a doctor. The people of the city Kadapa worship her like a goddess. Devendra, a political campaigner and Peddanna's brother, kidnap the doctor's daughter to make sure that she tells everyone to vote for him, but to no avail. Satya arrives and thrashes up Devendra's men, where he learns that he has to acquire ₹72 crore (US$7.5 million) to keep the doctor's hospital running as Devendra's father had donated the land to the hospital. Peddanna kills the doctor with the help of his goons as Satya has thrashed his brother. In order to get the money and exact vengeance against the goons who killed the doctor, Satya had joined GK.

Present: Satya is back in his house and is dealing with Ashtalakshmi's parents, who are weeping uncontrollably. He finds out that Peddanna's men long ago kidnapped Ashtalakshmi's elder brother. Satya goes to the headquarters where her brother is held and frees him. Satya later finds out that Ashtalakshmi had robbed ₹180 crore (US$19 million) from Peddanna with the help of her brother, where she and her brother leave to Bangkok. Satya and Sirisha arrive at Bangkok, where it is revealed that Ashtalakshmi doesn't have money. Sirisha and Ashtalakshmi are friends and Ashtalakshmi is the same tattooed girl from the pub. Satya reveals that he knew about their plan from the beginning and that he was the one who stolen the money. Satya is here to kill Nanda as he knew that Ashtalakshmi's brother will follow Nanda to get his money's share. Satya kills Nanda and returns to India. GK listening to one of his henchmen's words, escapes to Dubai so Satya won't kill him. Peddanna kidnaps Satya's younger sister and tries to bury her, but Satya arrives with Peddhanna's brother. Satya then kills Peddhanna's men and his enforcer. He finally exacts his vengeance for his mother by killing off Peddhanna, and saving the hospital. Devendra, Peddhanna's brother runs away presumably being spared.

== Cast ==
- Nagarjuna Akkineni as Satya Reddy
- Anushka Shetty as Sirisha
- Priyamani as Priya / Ashta Lakshmi
- Dev Gill as G. K.(voice dubbed by P Ravi Shankar)
- Pradeep Rawat as Peddanna
- Kota Srinivasa Rao as Gangaiah
- Brahmanandam as Veera Brahmam alias Brahmam Darling
- Tanikella Bharani as Devudu
- Dharmavarapu Subramanyam as Narayana
- Sushant Singh as Nanda
- Supreeth as Bhagawan
- Raghu Babu as Hotel Server
- Raghu Karumanchi as Brahmam Darling's henchman
- Vennira Aadai Nirmala as Nirmalamma
- Satya Prakash as Devendra, Peddanna's brother
- Narsing Yadav as Truck Driver
- Bharath Reddy as Kanth, Peddanna's sidekick who betrays Pedanna
- Besant Ravi as Peddanna's enforcer
- Master Bharath as Narayana
- Sravan as Jayaram
- Giridhar as Govardhan
- Banerjee
- Jenny
- Prudhvi Raj as gold shop owner
- Amith
- Ranam Venu
- Sasidhar
- Sana
- Srilalitha as Sathya's sister (Nirmalamma's daughter)
- Rajani
- Charmy Kaur in a special appearance in the song "Meesamunna Manmadhuda"
- Anita Hassanandani Reddy as Banker (cameo)

== Soundtrack ==
Ragada

Soundtrack album by S. Thaman
- Released: 29 November 2010
- Recorded: 2010
- Genre: Film soundtrack
- Length: 25:21
- Label: Aditya Music
- Producer: S. Thaman

S. Thaman chronology
Brindavanam (2010)	Ragada (2010)	Mirapakay (2010)

The soundtrack was composed by S. Thaman and released by Aditya Music. The audio was launched on 29 November 2010 at the Shilpa Kala Vedika in Hyderabad.

All tracks are written by Ramajogayya Sastry.

Track-List
No.	Title	Singer(s)	Length
1.	"Meesamunna Manmadhuda"	Shankar Mahadevan, Rita Thyagarajan, Hima Bindhu	4:46
2.	"Shirisha Shirisha"	Hariharan, Sri Vardhini, Baba Sehgal	4:07
3.	"Okkadante Okkade"	Ramya NSK, Suchitra	3:20
4.	"Bholo Ashta Lakshmi"	Geetha Madhuri, Karthik	4:14
5.	"Ragada Ragada"	Baba Sehgal, Rita Thyagarajan, K.S. Chithra	4:44
6.	"Empillo Apple O"	Karthik, Anuradha Sriram	3:53
Total length:			25:21

== Reception ==
Ragada received generally mixed to positive reviews from critics.

Idlebrain.com gave it 3 stars out of 5, similarly praising Nagarjuna's performance and Anushka's acting without the makeup along with the twists in the second half, the action sequences and the technical aspects, while criticizing the lack of story in the first half and the presence of multiple villains.

On the other hand, Rediff.com gave it 2.5 stars out of 5 and praised Nagarjuna's performance and called the film worth the money while also labelling it formulaic.

== Box office ==
Ragada collected ₹8.48 crores in the opening week. In the second week, the collections amounted to ₹11.54 crores. The total collections in the fourth week amounted to ₹15.27 crores and the total collections including the overseas share were equal to ₹17.15 crores and worldwide gross was ₹30 crores.
