= Kshanam =

2016 Indian Telugu-language mystery film

- Theatrical release poster
- Directed by: Ravikanth Perepu
- Screenplay by: Adivi Sesh; Ravikanth Perepu; Abburi Ravi (guidance)
- Dialogues by: Abburi Ravi
- Story by: Adivi Sesh
- Produced by: Param V. Potluri; Kavin Anne
- Starring: Adivi Sesh; Adah Sharma; Anasuya Bharadwaj; Satyadev; Vennela Kishore; Satyam Rajesh
- Cinematography: Shaneil Deo
- Edited by: Arjun Shastri; Ravikanth Perepu
- Music by: Sricharan Pakala
- Production companies: Matinee Entertainment; PVP cinema
- Release date: 26 February 2016
- Running time: 118 minutes
- Country: India
- Language: Telugu
- Budget: ₹1.08 crore
- Box office: est.₹12 crore

Kshanam (transl. Moment) is a 2016 Indian Telugu-language mystery thriller film directed by Ravikanth Perepu. The film features Adivi Sesh (who also served as a co-writer of the film) and Adah Sharma in lead roles while Anasuya Bharadwaj, Satyadev, Vennela Kishore, Satyam Rajesh, and Ravi Varma in supporting roles with the music is by Sricharan Pakala and cinematography by Shaneil Deo. In the film, Rishi arrives in India where he begins to search for a missing child of his ex-girlfriend Shwetha.

The film was released on 26 February 2016 where it received positive reviews from critics and audience. It was later remade in several other languages: Tamil as Sathya (2017), in Hindi as Baaghi 2 (2018), in Kannada as Aadyaa (2020), and in Sinhala as Kidnap (2023).

== Plot ==
Rishi, a San Francisco-based investment banker, receives a phone call from his ex-girlfriend Swetha after a long separation. The two had studied medicine together and wished to marry, but Swetha's father instead arranged her marriage to an entrepreneur named Karthik. Still harboring feelings for her, Rishi travels to India under the guise of attending a family wedding. He rents a car through a travel agent, Babu Khan, secures a local SIM card, and checks into a hotel. Meeting Swetha at a restaurant, Rishi learns that her five-year-old daughter, Riya, has been kidnapped. Swetha desperately laments that no one—including her husband Karthik—believes Riya actually exists. She also warns him about Karthik's drug-addicted brother, Bobby, who frequently loiters around her house.

Rishi launches an informal investigation, which repeatedly falters and draws the hostility of local gangsters. Babu, who assists the gangsters in transporting narcotics, intervenes to save Rishi on humanitarian grounds. Posing as a police officer named Vasanth Khanna, Rishi confronts Karthik, who insists that he and Swetha are childless. Karthik explains that Swetha was previously assaulted by two masked carjackers outside a school, fell into a coma, and woke up suffering from a delusion that she had a five-year-old daughter. Rishi obtains CCTV footage of the attack, but Riya is nowhere to be seen in the video, prompting him to doubt Swetha's sanity.

When Rishi confronts Swetha, she fiercely denies that Riya is imaginary. While Rishi notices height markings of a child drawn on a wall and realizes that Riya exists, a distraught Swetha suddenly commits suicide in front of him. ACP Jaya and Inspector Ravi Chowdary take over the investigation. Soon after, the real officer Khanna is murdered at Rishi's hotel, and Babu confesses to Rishi that he witnessed Bobby kidnapping Riya. Armed with this lead, Rishi gets Bobby arrested, but Bobby is shot dead in custody by Jaya, who claims self-defense. That night, Khanna's killers ambush Rishi and Babu; Babu manages to shoot the attackers dead but dies in the gunfight. On one of the deceased assassins' phones, Rishi discovers an MMS from Jaya ordering his execution.

Rishi tracks Jaya to her secluded farmhouse, where he finds Riya alive. Jaya reveals that Karthik had ordered the original hit on Swetha to kill Riya, but Jaya intercepted the child from Bobby's custody. Having lost her own husband and unborn child in a car crash, the grieving Jaya resolved to raise Riya as her own. She struck a deal with Karthik: in exchange for keeping the child, she helped Karthik systematically gaslight Swetha. Karthik convinced his social circle to pretend Riya never existed, driving Swetha to madness.

Before Jaya can execute Rishi, Inspector Chowdary, who was listening to the confession while en route, arrives with his unit and shoots Jaya dead. Karthik is arrested and confesses that Riya could not be his daughter, as medical tests had previously confirmed his sterility. Rishi recalls his final meeting with Sweta years prior, when she visited him to deliver her wedding invitation and they slept together. Realizing that Riya is his own biological daughter, Rishi approaches the young girl as a vision of Sweta smiles back at him.

== Cast ==
- Adivi Sesh as Rishi
- Adah Sharma as Swetha
- Anasuya Bharadwaj as ACP Jaya Bharadwaj
- Satyadev as Karthik
- Amit Sachdev as Commissioner Lucknow
- Vennela Kishore as Babu Khan
- Satyam Rajesh as Ravi Chowdary
- Mohan Beela as Constable
- Ravi Varma as Bobby
- Baby Dolly as Riya
- Abuzy as Nigerian
- Marcellein Koffi Houessou as Nigerian
- Kunle Awosanya as Nigerian
- Seedha Ahmed as Nigerian
- Ravi Raja Maguluri as Assassin
- Shashank Kalavala as Anil
- Vaishnavi Sridhar as Rishi's mother
- Nicola Vann as Stacy
- Anusha Gavarapati as Pooja
- Rachana Koduri as Swetha's friend
- Swaraj Rebbapragada as Swetha's father
- Raju B. as Chotu
- Shanmukha G. as SI Ganesh
- Lalitha Pamidipati as School principal
- Ravikanth Perepu as Marwari Seth
- Ramakrishna Repalle as Rishi's brother-in-law
- Garry BH as Srinivas Reddy
- Luckshmikanth Dev as Sai Prakash
- Amit Sachdev as Jai Singh Mehra
- Uma Akkineni as Hema
- Abhijeeth Deshpande as Jeet

== Production ==
The production of the movie was set about, when Prasad V Potluri of PVP Cinema agreed to bankroll the film and Sesh's friend Ravikanth Perepu was chosen to direct the film; it marked the latter's debut in Telugu cinema. Sesh and Perepu worked on the screenplay for ten months. Pre-production phase began three months after the scripting work commenced. Sesh and Perepu chose to work with a low budget to make the project a feasible one, considering the genre's appeal. The film's crew consisted of 20 members; two of Perepu's twelfth grade friends were the associate directors.

While writing the script, Sesh and Perepu discussed possibilities for every situation and discarded the first one as it would be a predictable one. Shaneil Deo was the film's director of photography. Sricharan Pakala composed the film's soundtrack and score. Perepu edited the film with Arjun Shastri; Sesh and the associate directors did get involved in the process. Sesh played Rishi, an investment banker who searches for his ex-girlfriend's missing child on her request. He stated that Rishi was modelled on his real self in terms of sensibilities except for the fact that the character is an alcoholic.

== Themes and influences ==
The film's concept was inspired by an incident in actor and filmmaker Adivi Sesh's life when he felt scared for a four-year-old girl and her friends at a school in Jubilee Hills, Hyderabad. Sesh wanted to make a thriller film with the missing of a three-year-old being the backdrop. and the core idea of the film is influenced from the 2005 English film Flightplan.

== Soundtrack ==
The music was composed by Sricharan Pakala and released by Junglee Music. The background score of the film was much appreciated with the songs "Cheliya" and "Ee Kshanam" topping the charts.

Kshanam

Soundtrack album by Sricharan Pakala
- Released: 21 February 2016
- Recorded: 2016
- Genre: Soundtrack
- Length: 21:39
- Label: Junglee Music
- Producer: Sricharan Pakala

Sricharan Pakala chronology
Kiss (2013)	Kshanam (2016)	Guntur Talkies (2016)

Track list
No.	Title	Lyrics	Singer(s)	Length
1.	"Ee Kshanam"	Ramajogayya Sastry	Ravikanth Perepu	4:04
2.	"Pada Pada Pranama"	Ramajogayya Sastry	Poojan Kohli, Ambika Sashittal	4:22
3.	"Cheliya Cheliya"	Sirasri	Ishaq Vali, Nalini Srikar	4:16
4.	"Nostalgia"		Instrumental	2:15
5.	"Conspiracy"		Instrumental	2:47
6.	"Soul Of Kshanam"		Instrumental	1:51
7.	"Rishi's Destiny"		Instrumental	2:04
Total length:				21:39

== Release ==
Kshanam was released on 26 February 2016 across Telangana and Andhra Pradesh and received critical acclaim and received positive response from the first show.

=== Home media ===
The film's satellite and digital rights were sold to Gemini TV and Sun NXT.

== Critical reception ==
Kshanam received positive reviews from critics and audience.

Pranita Jonnalagedda of The Times Of India gave the film 3.5 out of 5 stars and wrote "Kshanam is a film you most definitely shouldn’t miss; after all it’s not every day that you get to experience something meaningful yet exciting in Telugu cinema". Suresh Kavirayani of Deccan Chronicle gave the film 3.5/5 and wrote "For this kind of genre bgm is very important and Sricharan Pakala hit's the bulls eye.The Cinematography is good and visuals are thrilling but there are some logical flaws".

123 Telugu gave the film 3.25/5 and wrote "Kshanam ends up as an intense and enjoyable thriller which will not disappoint you at all". Idlebrain gave the film 3.25/5 and wrote "Kshanam is a decent and engaging suspense thriller despite a couple of unconvincing points". Sangeetha Devi Dundoo of The Hindu stated "Kshanam has a taut screenplay, brings to fore underrated actors and marks a terrific directorial debut".

== Box office ==
In 10 days since its release, Kshanam grossed about ₹ 4.8 crores at the Telugu (AP and Telangana) Box office. It collected $65,679 (₹ 44.83 lakh) from 27 screens at the US box office in the first weekend. In its second weekend, it collected $28,889 from 20 screens at the US box office and its 10-day total US collection stands at $111,037 (₹ 74.68 lakh).

== Remakes ==
The film was remade in Tamil as Sathya (2017) directed by Pradeep Krishnamoorty, in Hindi as Baaghi 2 (2018) directed by Ahmed Khan and starring Tiger Shroff and Disha Patani, and in Kannada as Aadyaa (2020) directed by K. M. Chaitanya and in Sinhala as Kidnap directed by Suranga de Alwis.

== Accolades ==
Ceremony	Category	Nominee	Result	Ref.
64th Filmfare Awards South	Filmfare Award for Best Film – Telugu	PVP Cinema Matinee Entertainment	Nominated	
64th Filmfare Awards South	Filmfare Award for Best Director – Telugu	Ravikanth Perepu	Nominated	
64th Filmfare Awards South	Filmfare Award for Best Supporting Actress – Telugu	Anasuya Bharadwaj	Nominated	
2nd IIFA Utsavam	Best Story	Adivi Sesh	Nominated	
2nd IIFA Utsavam	Best Performance In A Supporting Role – Female	Anasuya Bharadwaj	Nominated	
2nd IIFA Utsavam	Best Film	Prasad V. Potluri Matinee Entertainment	Nominated	
2nd IIFA Utsavam	Best Screenplay	Adivi Sesh	Won	
Nandi Award	Best Screenplay Writer	Adivi Sesh	Won	
5th South Indian International Movie Awards	SIIMA Award for Best Supporting Actress (Telugu)	Anasuya Bharadwaj	Won	

== See also ==
- Bunny Lake Is Missing (1965)
