= Cam2Cam =

- Directed by: Joel Soisson
- Written by: Marie Gautier (original story); Davy Sihali(original story); Joel Soisson (screenplay)
- Starring: Tammin Sursok; Ben Wiggins; Sarah Bonrepaux
- Edited by: Philip Mangano
- Music by: Elia Cmíral
- Distributed by: IFC Midnight
- Release date: August 22, 2014
- Running time: 91 minutes
- Countries: United States; Thailand; Austria
- Language: English

Cam2Cam (also known under the working titles of Darknet and c2c) is a 2014 horror film directed by Joel Soisson and starring Tammin Sursok as a tourist who becomes the target of a serial killer after logging on to a webcam model website. The film was given a simultaneous limited theatrical and VOD release on August 22, 2014. The movie was based on a short film that was directed by Davy Sihali, in which Soisson worked into the first portion of the film.

== Synopsis ==
Allie (Tammin Sursok) is a young American staying in a hostel apartment building while travelling through Thailand. A friendly boarder introduces her to Cam2Cam, a popular online chat program that allows people to interact with one another. Curious, Allie logs on and soon discovers that there was a serial killer who used Cam2Cam to find his female victims, one of whom was staying in Allie's current room. After fellow boarder Marit (Sarah Bonrepaux) is murdered, Allie begins to worry that she is next on the serial killer's list.

== Cast ==
- Tammin Sursok as Allie
- Ben Wiggins as Michael
- Sarah Bonrepaux as Emilie / Marit / Charlotte
- Jade Tailor as Lucy
- Russell Geofrey Banks as Russell
- Kotchanan Grubbmo as Jade
- Nicky Tamrong as Pig Boy

== Reception ==
Joshua Brunsting from Criterion Cast wrote, "Soisson’s new film opens rather well. Erotically charged and not afraid of slowly building tension, the opening “act” is arguably the film’s strongest point. Perfectly paced and featuring some fun performances, the opening sequence is tense and lushly shot, all throwing a cloud of impending doom over the proceedings." Dennis Harvey from Variety wrote, "a sloppy chiller about tourists falling prey to an online stalker in Bangkok that clumsily mixes slasher, sexploitation and supernatural elements." AwardsWiz.com wrote, "an ending I found satisfying and clearly sequel worthy."

Critical reception for Cam2Cam has been generally unfavorable, with the mixed criticisms centered upon how the film handled multiple genres, as review sites like Shock Till You Drop commented that the movie "straddles the middle without committing to any one genre", which they felt kept it from being as interesting as it might otherwise have been. The Hollywood Reporter commented the film was "all largely incoherent, with the screenplay's twists and surprise revelations having an utterly artificial feel" while Slant Magazine stated that the "promising first act, an effectively self-contained game of cat and mouse, paves the way for an increasingly tedious murder mystery that revels in the tired device of killing off characters just as they appear to be assuming prominence in the narrative as either the hero or the big bad". Twitch Film also panned the movie, praising the cinematography and gore while writing that "in the end, the crummy dialogue, the naive approach to technology, and the squandering of its many opportunities become too obvious to be overlooked". Ain't It Cool News praised the directors work stating "Soisson keeps things moving at a pretty rapid pace from start to finish and has a deft handling of suspense. Exemplified fantastically in the beginning sequence, Soisson knows how to ratchet up the thrills and tease us".
