= Bubblegum (film) =

2023 Indian film

- Theatrical release poster
- Directed by: Ravikanth Perepu
- Written by: Ravikanth Perepu
- Story by: Ravikanth Perepu; Vishnu Kondur; Seri-Ganni
- Produced by: P. Vimala
- Starring: Roshan Kanakala; Maanasa Chowdary; Harsha Chemudu; Kiran Macha; Anannyaa Akulaa
- Cinematography: Suresh Ragutu
- Edited by: Ravikanth Perepu; K. Balakrishna Reddy; Balu Manoj D. Seri-Ganni
- Music by: Sricharan Pakala
- Production companies: Maheshwari Movies; People Media Factory
- Release date: 29 December 2023
- Running time: 148 minutes
- Country: India
- Language: Telugu

Bubblegum is a 2023 Indian Telugu-language romantic drama film directed by Ravikanth Perepu and produced by Maheshwari Movies and People Media Factory. It stars Roshan Kanakala, Maanasa Choudhary, Chaitu Jonnalagadda, Harsha Chemudu, Anannyaa Akulaa, Anu Hasan, Kiran Macha in lead roles. The film was theatrically released in India on 29 December 2023.

== Plot ==
Aadi", a middle-class youth from Hyderabad's Old City who dreams of becoming an international DJ, and Jhanvi, a career-focused fashion designer from an affluent background. Aadi works toward his music goals with deep self-belief despite his humble family background, and he soon crosses paths with Jhanvi, a progressive girl whose rich parents fully support her impending move to Turkey for fashion school. Jhanvi is recovering from a bitter breakup and initially holds a cynical view of romance, but despite their massive socio-economic divide, the two fall deeply in love. Jhanvi showers him with expensive gifts and luxury items, which unintentionally triggers Aadi's insecurities and causes his friends to wonder if she is just playing with him. The relationship hits a devastating wall during a critical incident at a high-end party where Jhanvi's wealthy circle and ex-boyfriend mock Aadi's status, culminating in a public situation where Aadi faces extreme humiliation and insult. When Jhanvi fails to stand up for him adequately and lets her privilege hurt his self-respect, a deeply wounded Aadi cuts ties with her to focus purely on his dignity and career aspirations. Aadi works hard to become an singer, while Jhanvi makes multiple attempts to come back into Aadi life. In the End, they decide to part ways as matured adults and build a career. Aadi becomes a singer and Jhanvi travels to explore world.

== Cast ==
- Roshan Kanakala as Sai Aditya "Aadi"
- Maanasa Choudhary as Jhanvi "Jaanu"
- Harsha Vardhan as Vishwanath, Jhanavi's father
- Anu Hasan as Neelima, Jhanavi's mother
- Chaitanya Jonnalagadda as Yadagiri, Sai Aditya's father
- Bindu Chandramouli, Sai Aditya's mother
- Harsha Chemudu as Madman
- Anannyaa Akulaa as Bujji
- Kiran Macha as Asif
- Vishnu Kondur
- Akshita Setty
- Sanjay Duggu
- Faima as Jhanavi's maid
- Lobo as a chef
- Naveen Thomas
- Brahmanandam in a special appearance

== Soundtrack ==
The music and background score is composed by Sricharan Pakala. The audio rights were acquired by Sony Music South.

== Release ==
Bubblegum had a worldwide theatrical release on 29 December 2023.

The digital streaming of the film was sold to Aha. The film was made available from 9 February 2024 in Telugu.

It received an 'A' certificate by CBFC due to profanity.

== Reception ==
Sangeetha Devi Dundoo of The Hindu wrote that "Bubblegum title doesn't allude to a saccharine romance but rather emphasizes how romance, initially delightful, can become as adhesive as bubblegum, challenging to extricate oneself from even if the desire to do so exists."

Paul Nicodemus of The Times of India gave the film 2.5/5 stars and wrote that "Bubblegum takes on the complicated stuff—love, ambition, and self-respect. It goes through the usual romance and drama, but does it in a new way with great acting. It's a movie worth watching."

Chandu Donkana of Sakshi Post gave the film 2.5/5 stars and wrote "The storyline takes a departure from conventional love tales, unfolding a love track that advances with limited emotional resonance, predominantly fueled by desires rather than profound feelings."

Abhilasha Cherukuri of The New Indian Express gave the film 3/5 stars that stated "The film, starting slow with generic elements and stereotypes, gains momentum post-interval with a compelling redemption arc. Lead actor Roshan delivers a charming debut, and Jayram Eeshwar's memorable performance adds depth to the recurring theme of incomplete love stories in director Ravikanth Perepu's films."

Nelki Naresh Kumar of Hindustan Times wrote that "Bubble Gum emerges as a modern love story. Despite a somewhat conventional plot, the film distinguishes itself through its bold and audacious content, catering specifically to the preferences of the youthful audience."

Bhargav Chaganti of NTV Telugu gave the film 2.5/5 stated “Bubble Gum, struggles with clichéd romance and forced comedy, despite some impressive moments in the love track and an impactful Interval Bang. The film lacks depth in establishing the reasons for the characters’ love, leaving the overall narrative with a routine feel."

A critic from Eenadu stated that Commencing with a "Bubblegum-like blandness, the story unfolds slowly, gradually revealing a touch of sweetness towards the end. However, it falls short in the novelty department, with a lackluster first half dragging down the overall appeal."

A critic from V6 News wrote that "Love, resembling the journey of bubblegum, begins with chewing but transforms into a lingering challenge, symbolized by its adhesive persistence under shoes and on theater seats."
