= Jade Tailor =

American actress

Jade Tailor is an American actress. She is known for her regular role as Kady in the Syfy television series The Magicians (2015–2020), and for starring in the 2018 film Higher Power.

== Career ==
In 2010, she portrayed the lead role in Karma, an Indian Telugu-language film directed by Adivi Sesh. Regarding her performance, a critic noted that "Jade Tailor should be complimented for acting in a Telugu film. She did her best to fit into a film dealing with Indian mythology".

Tailor also played recurring characters in the TNT series Murder in the First, and the NBC series Aquarius opposite David Duchovny. Tailor has also guest starred on Vegas and True Blood.

In film, Tailor portrayed the role of Heather Steadman in the 2018 film Higher Power, a science fiction thriller about a regular person who acquires the power of a demigod. She also starred in the thrillers Cam2Cam in 2014 and Altered Perception in 2017.

From 2015 to 2020, Tailor played Kady in the SyFy television series The Magicians, based on Lev Grossman's book trilogy, and was promoted to main character status starting with the series' second season.

== Personal life ==
Her father is Israeli and she speaks Hebrew. Her American mother, Sally Pansing Kravich, was a former figure skater and an actress in the 1970s, and her brother is an attorney.

== Filmography ==
=== Film ===
Year	Title	Role	Notes
2007	You're So Dead	Nicole	
2008	Dark Reel	Laura	Uncredited
2010	In My Sleep	Babysitter	
2010	Karma	Padma	Indian Telugu film
2011	Losing Control	Gypsy LaRue	
2012	Wedding Day	Jasmine	
2013	Don't Pass Me By	Dee Williams	
2014	Cam2Cam	Lucy	
2016	Wild for the Night	Ivy	
2017	Altered Perception	Kristina	
2018	Higher Power	Heather Steadman	
2018	Juke Box Hero	Kiva	

=== Television ===
Year	Title	Role	Notes
2007	The Getaway	Angie	1 episode
2010	True Blood	Anne	Episode: "9 Crimes"
2012	The Invisible Bum	Alice Kinkade	2 episodes
2013	Vegas	Crystal Le Croix	Episode: "From This Day Forward"
2015	Aquarius	Rachel	2 episodes
2015	Murder in the First	Alyssa	Recurring role
2015	Raymond & Lane	Jade	Episodes: "The Auditions", "The Rehearsals"
2015–2020	The Magicians	Kady Orloff-Diaz	Recurring role (season 1); main role (seasons 2–5)
2020	Sinfidelity	Angela	Television film
2024	FBI: International	Ella	Episodes: "A Leader, Not a Tourist"
