= Karma (2010 film) =

Indian Telugu language film

- Directed by: Adivi Sesh
- Written by: Adivi Sesh
- Produced by: Bhavani Adivi; Harsh Singh
- Starring: Adivi Sesh; Jade Tailor
- Cinematography: James Laxton
- Edited by: Arjun Shastri; Harsh Singh
- Music by: Pete Wonder; Leland Thunes; Justin R. Durban
- Production company: Thousand Lights Inc.
- Release date: 15 November 2010
- Running time: 145 minutes
- Country: India
- Language: Telugu

Karma is a 2010 Indian Telugu-language supernatural thriller film directed by newcomer Adivi Sesh, who stars opposite American actress Jade Tailor.

== Cast ==
- Adivi Sesh as Dev
- Jade Tailor as Padma
  - Ria as young Padma
- Sher Ali as Raj
- Ramakrishna as Padma's father

== Production ==
The film marks the directorial and lead acting debut of Adivi Sesh, an Indian who grew up in San Francisco. Hollywood actress Jade Tailor auditioned for the film after seeing the film's synopsis on an advertisement. The film was shot in Big Sur, Carmel, and Pacifica. The film was shot in a single schedule of fifty-eight days with a crew of Hollywood and Indian technicians. James Laxton shot the film using a Red 4K camera. Telugu tutors helped Jade Tailor learn the Telugu language. The film was based on a car crash that Adivi Sesh had survived in San Francisco. This film was reportedly the first Telugu film to be completely shot in the United States and the first to release in the United States with subtitles.

== Soundtrack ==
The songs are composed by Hollywood musicians Pete Wonder, Leland Thunes, and Justin Durban. The soundtrack consists of six songs, two of which are background songs.

No.	Title	Length
1.	"Kalale"	1:35
2.	"Evari Manishi"	1:58
3.	"Prathi Shknamunaa"	1:44
4.	"Idi Thana Jeevitam"	3:35

== Release ==
A critic from Rediff wrote that "Karma is a tale told in a modern way, weaving in Hindu mythology. This perhaps stemmed from the fact that the director-cum-actor Sesh Adivi had a miraculous escape on a US freeway which set him thinking. That was the germ of Karma". A critic from Full Hyderabad wrote that "You might want to give Karma a try to look at the little offbeat activity that goes on in Telugu cinema, but we wouldn't recommend it for good entertainment at all".
