= Adivi Sesh =

Indian actor, director and screenwriter

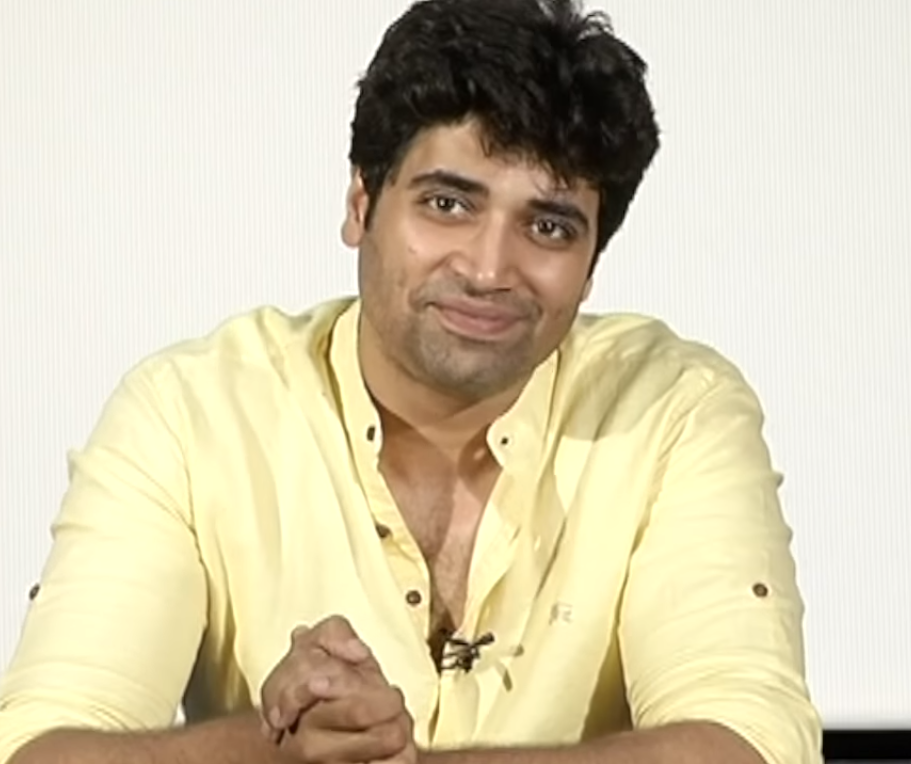
- Sesh in 2022
- Born: Adivi Sesh Sunny Chandra; 17 December 1985 (age 40); Hyderabad, Andhra Pradesh (now Telangana), India
- Occupations: Actor; director; screenwriter
- Years active: 2002–present
- Family: See Adivi family

Adivi Sesh Sunny Chandra (born 17 December 1985), commonly known as Adivi Sesh, is an Indian actor, director and screenwriter who works in Telugu cinema. He is one of the few actors in the Telugu Film Industry to consistently write the stories and screenplays of his own films, creating a unique actor-writer identity. Known for his work in action and suspense thrillers, he has received various awards including an IIFA Award Telugu, a SIIMA Award, and a Nandi Award He also won the first Gaddar Awards for his role in Major.

Sesh was born in Hyderabad and was raised in Berkeley, California. He made his film debut in 2002 in a small role for Sontham movie which starred Aryan Rajesh and Namitha and in 2010 as a lead actor and director with the romance Karma and gained recognition as an antagonist in Panjaa (2011), Balupu (2013), and Baahubali: The Beginning (2015).

Sesh then established himself as a leading man by writing and starring in successful action films such as Kshanam (2016), Goodachari (2018), Evaru (2019), Major (2022), HIT: The Second Case (2022) and Dacoit: A Love Story (2026).

== Early life ==
Adivi Sesh Sunny Chandra was born 17 December 1985 in Hyderabad, Andhra Pradesh (now in Telangana), India to Chandra Adivi, a doctor, and Bhavana Adivi. He studied at Padma Seshadri in Chennai, Tamil Nadu for a few years. He was raised in Berkeley, California, United States, where he attended Berkeley High School and started his undergraduate studies at San Francisco State University but eventually dropped out.

Sesh has a younger sister, who is a doctor in the US. His cousin, Sai Kiran Adivi, is a film director. Sesh is a vegetarian. He appealed to the Committee for Control and Supervision of Experiments on Animals (CCSEA) to take action against animal testing at research facilities.

== Career ==
Sesh debuted as an actor in the film Sontham (2002) in a small guest appearance. He debuted as a director and writer in the 2010 film Karma, which also stars Jade Tailor and Sher Ali. Sesh's portrayal of Dev, a person who can foresee events mere seconds before they happen, was well appreciated. Rediff praised his performance stating "As far as acting goes, Sesh Adivi does a good job. With an 'angelic' face he is an apt choice to play enigmatic Dev. His scripting skills also deserve mention. He may have chosen an unconventional path and a novel theme but he has tried to infuse something new in Telugu cinema."

In 2011, Sesh appeared in Vishnuvardhan's Panjaa. In this film, Sesh portrayed the role of Munna, an NRI who is a wealthy spoiled brat and a dangerous person to those around him. This also marked his debut as a villain. His performance was highly appreciated by critics. Rediff said of his performance, "Sesh Adivi is worth watching for his 'maniacal' performance which is just the opposite of what he did in Karma, his directorial and acting debut." CineGoer.com also praised his performance, saying "Sesh's Karma changes for the good with this film and he is quite a revelation." After this, he acted in the movie Balupu as a villain. Following this, he starred in and directed the film Kiss, the only critical flop in his career up to that point. He then did a supporting role in the hit Run Raja Run. After this, he played lead again in Ladies & Gentlemen and Dongaata in 2015. He then appeared in a supporting role in S. S. Rajamouli's epic drama Baahubali: The Beginning.

In 2016, Sesh starred in Kshanam, the story and screenplay of which was written by him along with Ravikanth Perepu, the director of the film. With this film, Sesh won the attention from the audience and industry. After Kshanam, he rejected more than fifty scripts that offered him the lead role. He then appeared in a cameo role in Size Zero and the Karthi starrer Oopiri. Around then, he appeared in Ami Thumi, a comedy film directed by Mohanakrishna Indraganti. His next film, Goodachari, an action thriller released on 3 August 2018 to positive reviews and became a super hit, and closed on 6 September at the box office 33 days after release. The film was written by him and directed by Sashi Kiran Tikka. He next did a special appearance in Oh! Baby, starring Samantha Akkineni. Following this was the suspense thriller Evaru, written and directed by Venkat Ramji. It released on 15 August 2019 to positive reviews, and went on to become a hit running for more than 4 weeks in theatres.

His next film Major, a biopic of Major Sandeep Unnikrishnan released on 3 June 2022, and received several accolades along with becoming a commercial hit. In April 2020, Sesh confirmed that he's begun scripting Goodachari 2, a sequel to his 2018 spy thriller Goodachari. Sesh then featured as lead in the investigative drama HIT: The Second Case. This film too went on to become a critical as well as box office success. In 2026, he starred in Dacoit: A Love Story along with Mrunal Thakur, Anurag Kashyap, Atul Kulkarni and Zayn Marie Khan. Directed by Shaneil Deo, it was released on 10 April 2026.

== Filmography ==
Key
†	Denotes films that have not yet been released

=== As an actor ===
Year	Title	Role	Notes	Ref.
2002	Sontham	Venkat	Debut film; minor role	
2010	Karma	Dev	Debut as lead actor; also writer and director	
2011	Panjaa	Munna		
2013	Balupu	Rohit		
2013	Kiss	Sunny	Also writer and director	
2014	Run Raja Run	SI Nayeem Basha		
2015	Ladies & Gentlemen	Rahul		
2015	Baahubali: The Beginning (Note: The film was simultaneously shot in Tamil.)	Bhadrudu / Bhadra	Simultaneously shot in Tamil	
2015	Dongaata	Venkat		
2015	Size Zero	Sekhar	Simultaneously shot in Tamil; cameo appearance	
2016	Kshanam	Rishi	Also writer	
2016	Oopiri	Abhinav	Cameo appearance	
2017	Ami Thumi	Ananth		
2018	Goodachari	M. Gopi / M. Arjun Kumar	Also writer	
2019	Oh! Baby	Savitri's husband	Cameo appearance	
2019	Evaru	SI Vikram Vasudev / Adarsh Varma		
2022	Major	Major Sandeep Unnikrishnan	Simultaneously shot in Hindi; also writer	
2022	HIT: The Second Case	SP Krishna Dev IPS "KD"		
2025	HIT: The Third Case	SP Krishna Dev IPS "KD"	Cameo appearance	
2025	Baahubali: The Epic	Bhadrudu	Combined re-release version of The Beginning and The Conclusion	
2026	Dacoit: A Love Story	Haridas "Hari"	Simultaneously shot in Hindi; also co-writer	
2027 G2 (5 February 2027 film)style="background: var(--background-color-warning-subtle, #fdf2d5); color: inherit; vertical-align: middle; text-align: left; " class="partial table-partial"|G2 †	M. Gopi / M. Arjun Kumar alias Agent Gopi 116	Also writer; Filming		

=== Other crew positions ===
Year	Title	Director	Writer	Notes
2010	Karma	Yes	Yes	Dialogues also
2013	Kiss	Yes	Yes	Dialogues also
2016	Kshanam	No	Story	Screenplay also
2018	Goodachari	No	Story	Screenplay also
2022	Major	No	Yes	
2026	Dacoit: A Love Story	No	Story	Screenplay also
2027	G2	No	Yes	

== Awards and nominations ==
Work	Award	Category	Result	Ref
Kiss	3rd SIIMA Awards	Best Male Debut – Telugu	Nominated	
Kshanam	Nandi Awards of 2016	Best Screenplay Writer	Won	
Kshanam	2nd IIFA Utsavam	Best Screenplay	Won	
Kshanam	2nd IIFA Utsavam	Best Story	Nominated	
Major	11th SIIMA Awards	Critics Best Actor – Telugu	Won	
Major	68th Filmfare Awards South	Best Actor – Telugu	Nominated	
Major	21st Santosham Film Awards	Best Actor	Won	
Major	Gaddar Telangana Film Awards	Best Feature Film	Won	

=== Other honours ===
Award	Category	Result	Ref
Pinkvilla Style Icons Awards	Stylish Game Changer - Male	Won	
