= Ravikanth Perepu =

Indian screenwriter

- Born: Visakhapatnam, Andhra Pradesh, India
- Occupations: Film director, screenwriter, editor
- Years active: 2013 – present
- Spouse: Veena Ghantasala (m. 2017)
- Awards: Nandi Award

Ravikanth Perepu is an Indian film director, screenwriter, and editor known for his works in Telugu cinema. Perepu won the state Nandi Award for Best Screenplay Writer for his directorial debut film Kshanam (2016).

== Personal life ==
Perepu was born in Visakhapatnam, Andhra Pradesh, into a Telugu-speaking family, to Perepu Nageswara Rao and his wife. He did his schooling at Kotak Salesian School; Intermediate from Mega Junior College in Visakhapatnam; graduated in Chemical Engineering from Gayatri Vidya Parishad College of Engineering, Visakhapatnam.

Perepu married Veena Ghantasala, granddaughter of singer, Ghantasala, in November 2017.

== Filmography ==
Year	Film	Credited as				Notes
Year	Film	Director	Writer	Editor	Actor	Notes
2016	Kshanam	Yes	Yes	Yes	Yes	
2020	Krishna and His Leela	Yes	Yes	Yes	No	
2020	Bhanumathi & Ramakrishna	No	No	Yes	Yes	
2022	DJ Tillu	No	Lyrics	No	No	for the song "Nuvvala"
2023	Month of Madhu	No	No	Yes	No	
2023	Bubblegum	Yes	Yes	No	No	

== Awards ==
Nandi Awards

- 2016: Best Screenplay Writer for Kshanam
