= Bigg Boss (Telugu TV series) season 8 =

2024 television show season

Bigg Boss
- Season 8
- Season 8 eye logo
- Presented by: Nagarjuna
- No. of days: 105
- No. of housemates: 22
- Winner: Nikhil Maliyakkal
- Runner-up: Gautham Krishna

Release
- Original network: Star Maa; Disney+ Hotstar
- Original release: 1 September – 15 December 2024

Season chronology
- ← Previous; Season 7 Next → season 9

Bigg Boss 8, also known as Bigg Boss 8: Limitless, is a reality show and the eighth season of the Indian Telugu-language reality television series Bigg Boss, produced by Banijay. The show premiered on 1 September 2024, on Star Maa and Disney+ Hotstar, with Nagarjuna returning as a host for the sixth time in a row.

The season's finale took place on 15 December 2024 with Nikhil Maliyakkal winning the title along with ₹55 lakh prize money and a car, while Gautham Krishna emerged as the first runner-up.

== Production ==
=== Logo ===
The logo of the season was revealed on 21 July 2024 representing infinity theme by symbolising the digit eight as an infinitum.

=== Teasers ===
The teaser was released on 11 August 2024 in which the concept of infinity, twists and turns was explained.

=== Concept ===
Infinite/limitless possibilities.

=== 24x7 streaming ===
The show is scheduled to be streamed 24/7 on Disney+ Hotstar and an hour-long episode every day on Star Maa. The episodes will be shown on a 24-hour live stream, from Monday to Friday.

== Housemates Status ==
#	Housemate	Day entered	Day exited	Status	Ref.
1	Nikhil	Day 1	Day 105	Winner	
2	Gautham	Day 35	Day 105	1st runner-up	
3	Nabeel	Day 1	Day 105	2nd Runner-up	
4	Prerana	Day 1	Day 105	3rd Runner-up	
5	Avinash	Day 35	Day 105	4th Runner-up	
6	Vishnupriya	Day 1	Day 98	Evicted	
7	Rohini	Day 35	Day 97	Evicted	
8	Prithvi	Day 1	Day 91	Evicted	
9	Teja	Day 35	Day 90	Evicted	
10	Yashmi	Day 1	Day 84	Evicted	
11	Hariteja	Day 35	Day 70	Evicted	
12	Gangavva	Day 35	Day 69	Walked	
13	Nayani	Day 35	Day 63	Evicted	
14	Mehaboob	Day 35	Day 56	Evicted	
15	Manikanta	Day 1	Day 49	Walked	
16	Seetha	Day 1	Day 42	Evicted	
17	Nainika	Day 1	Day 35	Evicted	
18	Aditya	Day 1	Day 32	Evicted By Housemates	
19	Soniya	Day 1	Day 28	Evicted	
20	Abhay	Day 1	Day 21	Evicted	
21	Shekar	Day 1	Day 14	Evicted	
22	Bebakka	Day 1	Day 7	Evicted	

== Housemates ==
The participants in the order of appearance and entered to the house are:

=== Original entrants ===
- Yashmi Gowda – Actress. She is known for her appearances in the fantasy television series Naga Bhairavi and the drama series Krishna Mukunda Murari.
- Nikhil Maliyakkal – Actor. He is known for his appearances in the television dramas Gorintaku, Oorvasivo Raakshasivo and Ammaku Teliyani Koilamma.
- Abhay Bethiganti – Actor and filmmaker. He is best known for his role as Vishnu in the film Pelli Choopulu (2016).
- Prerana Kambam Purushottam – Actress. She is best known for the drama series Krishna Mukunda Murari.
- Madhoo Nekkanti – Internet celebrity. Popularly known as "Bezawada Bebakka", she is popular for her short comedy videos.
- Shekar Basha – Radio jockey and activist. He is popular for his stint as a radio jockey in the 92.7 Big FM.
- Aditya Om – Actor and filmmaker. He is best known for his performance in the films Lahiri Lahiri Lahirilo (2002) and Preminchukunnam Pelliki Randi (2004).
- Soniya Akula – Actress. She has debuted with George Reddy (2019) and is best known for her role as Aasha in the 2022 docudrama Aasha Encounter.
- Kirrak Seetha – Actress. She is best known for her role as Seetha in the film Baby (2023).
- Chintamani Bhatla 'Naga' Manikanta – Actor. He is known for his appearances in the television drama Kasthuri.
- Prithviraj Shetty – Actor. He is known for his appearances in the television fantasy series Nagapanchami.
- Vishnupriyaa Bhimeneni – Actress and television presenter. She is best known as television presenter in the game show Pove Pora. She is also known her appearances in the film Wanted Pandugod (2022) and the crime thriller series Dayaa.
- Nainika Anasuru – Choreographer. She is popular for her performance in the reality dance competition shows Dance India Dance and Dhee.
- Nabeel Afridi – Internet celebrity. Founded the YouTube channel "Warangal Dairies" and popular for his comedy and parody videos. He has also appeared in Sharathulu Varthisthai (2024).

=== Wildcard entrants in Reloaded event ===
In week 4 and week 5, original entrants housemates had to take part in Survival of the Fittest Task to stop the number of wildcards to enter the house. They were successful to stop four of the twelve wild card entries. Eight housemates entered the house as part of the Royal Clan.

- Hari Teja — Actress. She was the second runner-up in season 1.
- Tasty Teja – Internet celebrity and comedian. He is known for his food vlogs on YouTube. Teja has also appeared in the television comedy show Jabardasth. He was evicted on Day 63 in season 7.
- Nayani Pavani – Internet celebrity. She was evicted on Day 42 in season 7.
- Mehaboob Shaikh – Internet celebrity. He is known as "Mehaboob Dilse". He was evicted on Day 70 in season 4.
- Rohini Noni Reddy – Actress. She is known for the comedy show Jabardasth. She was evicted on Day 28 in season 3.
- Gautham Krishna – Actor and doctor. He is known for his leading role in the film Aakasa Veedhullo. He was evicted on Day 91 in season 7.
- Mukku Avinash – Actor and comedian. He is best known for his appearance in the television comedy show Jabardasth. He was evicted on Day 91 in season 4.
- Gangavva – Internet celebrity and actress. She is best known for web series My Village Show Comedy with her grandson. She walked on Day 34 in season 4.

== Twists ==
=== Buddy twist ===
A total of 14 housemates have entered the house as pairs. Later 8 housemates have entered the house as pairs during the wildcard reload event.

Buddy No.	Pairs
1	Yashmi and Nikhil
2	Abhay and Prerana
3	Aditya and Sonia
4	Bebakka and Sekhar
5	Seetha and Manikanta
6	Prithviraj and Vishnupriyaa
7	Nainika and Nabeel
Wildcard reload
8	Hariteja and Teja
9	Nayani and Mehaboob
10	Rohini and Gautham
11	Avinash and Gangavva

=== Launch bad news ===
On launch day, three bad news were revealed to the housemates

- No captain: This season there will be no captaincy and no immunity.
- No ration: This season, housemates have to earn their ration each week.
- Zero cash prize: This season's winner cash prize is zero, but the housemates will get chances to make the prize money limitless.

Week		Prize money
Week 1	Day 1	₹0
Week 1	Day 7	₹5,00,000▲
Week 1	Day 7	₹3,00,000 ▼ (Note: All the housemates lost ₹2,00,000 for breaking the house rules.)
Week 2	Day 11	₹5,45,000▲ (Note: Housemates from Keratam Clan won ₹2,45,000 in various tasks.)
Week 2	Day 14	₹5,60,000▲ (Note: Housemates from Shakti Clan won ₹15.000 in the "Sunday Funday" game task.)
Week 3		₹11,60,000▲ (Note: Each female housemate from Shakti and Kantara Clan won ₹1,00,000 for their performance in the "Contender" task.)
Week 4	Day 25	₹14,60,000▲ (Note: Housemates from Shakti and Kantara Clan won ₹2,00,000 and ₹1,00,000 respectively in the "Survival Of The Fittest" task.)
Week 4	Day 28	₹15,00,000▲ (Note: Housemates from Kantara Clan won ₹40,000 in the "Sunday Funday" game task.)
Week 5	Day 31	₹18,00,000▲ (Note: Housemates from Shakti Clan won ₹3,00,000 in Round 2 of the "Survival Of The Fittest" task.)
Week 5	Day 35	₹38,00,000▲ (Note: Hariteja and Teja from Royal Clan won ₹20,00,000 in the "Reload Event" task.)
Week 6	Day 37	₹37,50,000 ▼ (Note: Housemates spent ₹50,000 for extra ration.)
Week 6	Day 41	₹38,66,500▲ (Note: Housemates from Royal Clan won ₹1,16,500 in the "BB Hotel" task.)
Week 7	Day 47	₹39,16,500▲ (Note: Avinash from Royal Clan won ₹50,000 in the "Haircut" task.)
Week 8	Day 50	₹38,16,500 ▼ (Note: Hariteja had the nominations shield from which she can be immune from nominations. Each nomination vote by a housemate deducts ₹50,000 from the prize money. ₹1,00,000 was thus deducted due to two nomination votes.)
Week 8	Day 54	₹40,16,000▲ (Note: Vishnupriyaa from OG Clan won ₹2,00,000 in the "Mega Chief" task.)
Week 8	Day 56	₹41,16,000▲ (Note: Nikhil and Yashmi from OG Clan won ₹1,00,000 in the "Deepawali Special" task.)
Week 9		₹42,16,000▲ (Note: Nikhil won ₹1,00,000 in the "Sunday Funday" game task.)
Week 10	Day 66	₹49,12,000▲ (Note: Rohini won ₹1,80,000; Nabeel won ₹1,25,000, Prithviraj won ₹99,000, Prerana won ₹2,12,000 and Yashmi won ₹75,000 in the "Mega Chief contender" task.)
Week 10	Day 70	₹49,07,000 ▼ (Note: ₹1,80,000 were deducted for taking extra ration even after the allotted time is completed, but they bargained Biigg Boss and only ₹5,000 was deducted.)
Week 11		₹50,30,000▲ (Note: Housemates' family members raised a total of ₹1,23,000 during the "Family Week" task.)
Week 13		₹54,30,000▲ (Note: Housemates had to bet on Ticket to Finale contenders, they bet ₹4,00,000 on Avinash.)
Week 14		₹54,99,999▲ (Note: Housemates won all the tasks in the "BB vs Maa Parivaram" task and raised ₹69,000 to the winner's prize money.)
Week 15		₹55,00,000▲ (Note: Gautam won the final task and raised ₹1.)

=== Clans ===
This season each Chief had a clan. The biggest clan had privileges like luxurious room with special treats exclusively for them and did not have to do any of the household duties. From Day 58 of Week 9 onwards there is only one clan named "BB".

Key:

indicates Anthuleni Veerulu Clan (Week 1–2)
indicates Keratam Clan (Week 1–2)
indicates Akhanda Clan (Week 1–2)
indicates Shakti Clan (Week 3–5)
indicates Kantara Clan (Week 3–5)

indicates OG Clan (Week 6–9)
indicates Royal Clan (Week 6–9)
indicates BB Clan (Week 9–15)
indicates no Clan

	Week 1		Week 2			Week 3	Week 4		Week 5	Week 6	Week 7	Week 8	Week 9–15
	Day 3	Day 5	Day 12	Day 13	Day 14	Week 3	Day 23	Day 26	Week 5	Week 6	Week 7	Week 8	Week 9–15
Nikhil	Chief			Chief					No Clan	OG			BB
Yashmi	Chief			No Clan	Kantara		Shakti		No Clan	OG			BB
Gautham										Royal			BB
Nabeel	Anthuleni Veerulu			No Clan	Kantara				No Clan	OG			BB
Prerana	Akhanda			No Clan	Kantara				No Clan	OG			BB
Avinash										Royal			BB
Vishnupriyaa	Anthuleni Veerulu			No Clan	Shakti		Kantara		No Clan	OG			BB
Rohini										Royal			BB
Prithviraj	Akhanda			No Clan	Shakti				No Clan	OG			BB
Teja										Royal			BB
Hariteja										Royal			BB
Gangavva										Royal			BB
Nayani										Royal			BB
Mehaboob										Royal			
Manikanta	Keratam			No Clan	Kantara		Shakti	Kantara	No Clan	OG			
Seetha	Anthuleni Veerulu			No Clan	Shakti		Chief		No Clan	OG			
Nainika	Chief			No Clan	Shakti		Kantara		No Clan				
Aditya	Anthuleni Veerulu			No Clan	Kantara			Shakti	No Clan				
Soniya	Keratam	Akhanda		No Clan	Shakti								
Abhay	Akhanda			Chief									
Shekar	Akhanda			No Clan	Shakti								
Bebakka	Keratam												

=== Bedroom allotment ===
This season's house had three bedrooms: Dragonfly Bedroom, Peacock Bedroom and Zebra Bedroom with different privileges.

Key:

indicates Dragonfly Room
indicates Peacock Room
indicates Zebra Room

	Week 1	Week 2	Week 3	Week 4	Week 5	Week 6	Week 7	Week 8	Week 9	Week 10	Week 11	Week 12	Week 13	Week 14	Week 15
Nikhil	Peacock Room		Dragonfly Room	Peacock Room											
Gautham						Zebra Room									
Nabeel	Zebra Room		Peacock Room	Dragonfly Room											
Prerana	Dragonfly Room		Peacock Room	Dragonfly Room											
Avinash						Zebra Room									
Vishnupriyaa	Zebra Room		Dragonfly Room												
Rohini						Zebra Room									
Prithviraj	Dragonfly Room			Peacock Room											
Teja						Zebra Room									
Yashmi	Dragonfly Room		Peacock Room			Dragonfly Room									
Hariteja						Peacock Room									
Gangavva						Zebra Room									
Nayani						Peacock Room									
Mehaboob						Zebra Room									
Manikanta	Peacock Room				Dragonfly Room										
Seetha	Zebra Room		Dragonfly Room												
Nainika	Zebra Room		Dragonfly Room												
Aditya	Zebra Room	Peacock Room		Dragonfly Room	Peacock Room										
Soniya	Dragonfly Room			Peacock Room											
Abhay	Dragonfly Room		Peacock Room												
Shekar	Dragonfly Room														
Bebakka	Peacock Room														

=== Infinity Room ===
On day 42, the Infinity Room was opened where special housemates will get to ask any request from Bigg Boss until the Bigg Boss Universe.

Week		Housemate	Request
Week 7	Day 42	Nabeel	Extra time to take ration.
Week 14	Day 93	Prerana	Vote appeal to win the season.
Week 14	Day 94	Nabeel	Vote appeal to win the season.
Week 14	Day 95	Vishnupriyaa	Vote appeal to win the season.
Week 14	Day 96	Nikhil	Vote appeal to win the season.

== Guest appearances ==
Week	Day	Event	Guest(s)	Purpose of visit	Ref.
Week 1	Day 0	Premiere	Rana Daggubati, Nivetha Thomas and Vishwadev Rachakonda	To promote their film 35.	
Week 1	Day 0	Premiere	Nani and Priyanka Mohan	To promote their film Saripodhaa Sanivaaram.	
Week 1	Day 0	Premiere	Anil Ravipudi	To conduct a game related to the "third bad news".	
Week 5	Day 35	Reload Event	Sree Vishnu, Ritu Varma and Daksha Nagarkar	To promote their film Swag.	
Week 5	Day 35	Reload Event	Suhas, Dil Raju, Sandeep Reddy Bandla and Sangeerthana Vipin	To promote their film Janaka Aithe Ganaka.	
Week 5	Day 35	Reload Event	Sudheer Babu, Sayaji Shinde and Aarna Vohra	To promote their film Maa Nanna Superhero.	
Week 6	Day 42	Dasara Special	Amritha Aiyer	Dance performance.	
Week 6	Day 42	Dasara Special	Mangli	Special performance and Bathukamma celebrations with housemates.	
Week 6	Day 42	Dasara Special	Sreenu Vaitla and Gopichand	To promote their film Viswam.	
Week 6	Day 42	Dasara Special	Dimple Hayathi	Dance performance.	
Week 6	Day 42	Dasara Special	Faria Abdullah	Dance performance.	
Week 8	Day 55	–	Suriya, Siva and K. E. Gnanavel Raja	To promote their film Kanguva.	
Week 8	Day 56	Deepawali Special	Anasuya Bharadwaj	Dance performance.	
Week 8	Day 56	Deepawali Special	Kiran Abbavaram, Nayan Sarika, Tanvi Ram	To promote their film KA.	
Week 8	Day 56	Deepawali Special	Mehreen Pirzada	Dance performance.	
Week 8	Day 56	Deepawali Special	Sameera Bharadwaj	Parody song performance.	
Week 8	Day 56	Deepawali Special	Dulquer Salmaan, Meenakshi Chaudhary, Venky Atluri	To promote their film Lucky Baskhar.	
Week 8	Day 56	Deepawali Special	Saanve Megghana	Dance performance.	
Week 8	Day 56	Deepawali Special	Sivakarthikeyan, Sai Pallavi, Rajkumar Periasamy	To promote their film Amaran.	
Week 8	Day 56	Deepawali Special	Hyper Aadi	Special commentary.	
Week 10	Day 70	–	Varun Tej	To promote his film Matka.	
Week 11	Day 72	–	Nusrat, Nabeel's mother	Family reunion week.	
Week 11	Day 72	–	Govindamma, Rohini's mother	Family reunion week.	
Week 11	Day 73	–	Sulekha, Nikhil's mother	Family reunion week.	
Week 11	Day 73	–	Ramesh, Yashmi's father	Family reunion week.	
Week 11	Day 73	–	Anuja, Avinash's wife	Family reunion week.	
Week 11	Day 74	–	Mohan, Vishnupriyaa's father	Family reunion week.	
Week 11	Day 74	–	Satyabhama, Pritiviraj's mother	Family reunion week.	
Week 11	Day 74	–	Jagadeesh, Gautham's brother	Family reunion week.	
Week 11	Day 75	–	Shripad Deshpande, Prerana's husband	Family reunion week.	
Week 11	Day 75	–	Lakshmi, Teja's mother	Family reunion week.	
Week 11	Day 76	–	Roopa (Prerana's mother), Prakruthi Kambam (Prerana's sister), Mamilla Shailaja Priya	To support Prerana.	
Week 11	Day 76	–	Pavani (Vishnupriyaa's sister), Anchor Ravi	To support Vishnupriyaa.	
Week 11	Day 76	–	Simhadri (Rohini's father), Sivaji	To support Rohini.	
Week 11	Day 76	–	Vikram (Pritiviraj's brother), Darsini Gowda	To support Prithviraj.	
Week 11	Day 76	–	Manga Devi (Gautham's mother), Syed Sohel Ryan	To support Gautham.	
Week 11	Day 76	–	Sharjeel Ali (Nabeel's brother), Bhole Shavali	To support Nabeel.	
Week 11	Day 77	–	Sri Satya, Samyuktha VJ	To support Yashmi.	
Week 11	Day 77	–	Srinivasa Reddy (Teja's father), VJ Sunny	To support Teja.	
Week 11	Day 77	–	Ashok, Kona Venkat	To support Avinash.	
Week 11	Day 77	–	Shashi (Nikhil's father), Amardeep Chowdary	To support Nikhil.	
Week 12	Day 81	–	Vishwak Sen	To promote his film Mechanic Rocky.	
Week 13	Day 86	–	Akhil Sarthak, Alekhya Harika	To conduct "Ticket to Finale" tasks.	
Week 13	Day 87	–	Maanas Nagulapalli, Priyanka Jain	To conduct "Ticket to Finale" tasks.	
Week 13	Day 88	–	Punarnavi Bhupalam, Vithika Sheru	To conduct "Ticket to Finale" tasks.	
Week 13	Day 89	–	Sreemukhi	To conduct "Ticket to Finale" tasks.	
Week 14	Day 93	–	Sekhar	To promote his song "Peelings" from the film Pushpa 2: The Rule.	
Week 14	Day 94	–	Sanjay Thumma	Special dinner for the housemates.	
Week 14	Day 95	–	Band Jammers	Special performance for the housemates.	
Week 14	Day 96	–	Ohmkar	To promote the third season of his television show Ismhart Jodi.	
Week 15	Day 99	–	Arjun Kalyan, Anumita Datta	To promote their television show Nuvvunte Naa Jathaga and participate in "BB vs Maa Parivaram" task	
Week 15	Day 99	–	Prabhakar Podakandla, Aamani	To promote their television show Illu Illalu Pillau and participate in "BB vs Maa Parivaram" task	
Week 15	Day 100	–	Deepika Rangaraju	To participate in "BB vs Maa Parivaram" task	
Week 15	Day 100	–	Akarsh Byramudi, Suhasini	To participate in "BB vs Maa Parivaram" task	
Week 15	Day 101	–	Vaishnavi, Krishna	To participate in "BB vs Maa Parivaram" task	
Week 15	Day 101	–	Shravan Kumar, Kruthika Umashankar	To participate in "BB vs Maa Parivaram" task	
Week 15	Day 104	–	Suma Kanakala	To conduct special games	
Week 15	Day 105	Grand Finale	Sri Krishna, Geetha Madhuri	Music performance.	
Week 15	Day 105	Grand Finale	Upendra	To promote his film UI.	
Week 15	Day 105	Grand Finale	Nabha Natesh	Dance performance.	
Week 15	Day 105	Grand Finale	Raai Laxmi	Dance performance.	
Week 15	Day 105	Grand Finale	Vijay Sethupathi, Manju Warrier	To promote their film Vidudala Part 2.	
Week 15	Day 105	Grand Finale	Ram Charan	To announce the winner.	

== Nomination table ==
	Week 1	Week 2		Week 3	Week 4		Week 5	Week 6	Week 7	Week 8	Week 9	Week 10	Week 11	Week 12	Week 13		Week 14	Week 15	
	Week 1	Day 8	Day 14	Week 3	Day 22	Day 28	Week 5	Week 6	Week 7	Week 8	Week 9	Week 10	Week 11	Week 12	Day 85	Day 90	Week 14	Week 15	
Nominees For House Chief(s)/ Mega Chief	Bebakka; Nabeel; Nainika; Nikhil; Shekar; Yashmi		Abhay; Aditya; Manikanta; Nabeel; Prerana; Prithviraj; Seetha; Shekar; Soniya; Vishnupriyaa		Nikhil; Soniya	Aditya; Manikanta; Nabeel; Nainika; Prerana; Prithviraj; Seetha; Soniya; Vishnupriyaa; Yashmi		Nabeel; Prithviraj	Avinash; Gautham; Hariteja; Manikanta; Mehaboob; Nayani; Rohini	Avinash; Gangavva; Gautham; Hariteja; Manikanta; Mehaboob; Nayani; Prerana; Rohini; Teja; VIshnupriyaa; Yashmi	Prithviraj; Nikhil; Prerana; Rohini; Teja; Vishnupriyaa	Avinash; Nikhil; Hariteja; Teja; Nabeel; Prerana	Nabeel; Prerana; Prithviraj; Rohini; Yashmi	Avinash; Gautham; Nabeel; Nikhil; Prerana; Prithviraj; Rohini; Vishnupriyaa; Yashmi	Prithviraj; Rohini; Teja; Vishnupriyaa; Yashmi		No Mega; Chief		
House Chief(s)/ Mega Chief	Nikhil Nainika Yashmi		Nikhil Abhay		Nikhil	Nikhil Seetha		Nabeel	Mehaboob	Gautham	Vishnupriyaa	Avinash	Prerana	Avinash	Rohini		No Mega; Chief		
Chiefs' Nominations	Prithviraj; Shekar; Soniya Manikanta (x2); Bebakka Bebakka; Manikanta (x2); Shekar; Vishnupriyaa	Prerana; Prithviraj Prerana; Prithviraj Prerana (to save); Vishnupriyaa (to evict)	Aditya (to save) Aditya (to save)	Abhay (to evict) Abhay (to evict)	Nainika (to save)	Soniya (to save) Manikanta (to save)	Vishnupriyaa; Manikanta Manikanta; Vishnupriyaa	Mehaboob; Gangavva	Not eligible	Hariteja (to save)	Gautham; Prerana; Teja; Nayani; Nabeel	Rohini (to save); Nikhil (to evict)	Gautham	Not eligible	Vishnupriyaa; Nabeel	Lost; TTF	No Mega; Chief		
Vote to:	Evict		Save	Evict		Save	Evict				Save/Evict	Evict				Ticket to Finale	Evict	none	
Nikhil	House; Chief	House; Chief						Mehaboob; Gangavva	~~Teja~~; ~~Teja~~; Teja	Mehaboob; Prerana	Not eligible	Gautham	Teja	Not eligible	Gautham; Prerana	Lost; TTF	Rohini	Winner (Day 105)	
Gautham	Not in house							Vishnupriyaa; Yashmi	~~Vishnupriyaa~~; Nabeel	Mega; Chief	Not eligible	Yashmi	Prithviraj	Not eligible	Nikhil; Prerana	Out of the race	Nikhil	1st Runner-up (Day 105)	
Nabeel	Manikanta; ~~Bebakka~~	Nikhil; Prithviraj	Aditya	Yashmi; Prerana	Soniya; Prithviraj	Manikanta	Vishnupriyaa; Nainika; Nikhil	Mega; Chief	~~Teja~~	Prerana; Hariteja	Not eligible	Vishnupriyaa	Not eligible	Not eligible	Gautham; Vishnupriyaa	Black; Star	Nominated	2nd Runner-up (Day 105)	
Prerana	~~Manikanta~~; Soniya	Nikhil; Seetha	Aditya	Seetha; Vishnupriyaa	Manikanta; Nainika	Manikanta	Manikanta; Aditya; Nikhil	Mehaboob; Gangavva	Gautham; Prithviraj; Nabeel	Vishnupriyaa; Prithviraj	Prithviraj (to save); Teja (to evict)	Hariteja	Mega; Chief	Not eligible	Vishnupriyaa; Gautham	Black; Star	Nominated	3rd Runner-up (Day 105)	
Avinash	Not in house							Prithviraj; Yashmi	Manikanta	Walked (Day 56) Prithviraj; Nikhil	Teja (to save); Yashmi (to evict)	Mega; Chief	Not eligible	Mega; Chief	Prithviraj; Vishnupriyaa	Won; TTF	Vishnupriyaa	4th Runner-up (Day 105)	
Vishnupriyaa	Shekar; ~~Soniya~~	Manikanta; Soniya	Aditya	Prerana; Yashmi	Aditya; Prerana	Manikanta	Nainika; Nabeel; Nikhil	Mehaboob; Gangavva	Nayani	Prerana; Nikhil	Mega; Chief	Prerana	Not eligible	Not eligible	Teja; Prerana	Black; Star	Gautham	Evicted (Day 98)	
Rohini	Not in house							Yashmi; Vishnupriyaa	Gautham	Nikhil; Prithviraj	Avinash (to save); Prithviraj (to evict)	Yashmi	Vishnupriyaa	Not eligible	Mega; Chief		Nominated	Evicted (Day 97)	
Prithviraj	~~Bebakka~~; Manikanta	Manikanta; Nainika	Aditya	Seetha; Nainika	Nabeel; Manikanta	Soniya	Nainika; Manikanta; Seetha	Mehaboob; Gangavva	Avinash	Prerana; Rohini	Nabeel (to save); Avinash (to evict)	Rohini	Avinash	Not eligible	Avinash; Gautham	Out of the race	Evicted (Day 91)		
Teja	Not in house							Seetha; Manikanta	Yashmi	Vishnupriyaa; Prithviraj	Not eligible	Prithviraj	Yashmi	Not eligible	Vishnupriyaa; Prithviraj	Lost; TTF	Evicted (Day 90)		
Yashmi	House; Chief		Aditya	Manikanta; Nainika	Manikanta; Soniya	Manikanta	Manikanta; Aditya; Seetha	Mehaboob; Gangavva	~~Teja~~	Vishnupriyaa; Mehaboob	Prerana (to save); Hariteja (to evict)	Gautham	Not eligible	Not eligible	Gautham	Evicted (Day 84)			
Hariteja	Not in house							Yashmi; Prithviraj	Nikhil; Manikanta; Yashmi; Teja; Avinash	Prerana; Mehaboob	Not eligible	Prerana	Evicted (Day 70)						
Gangavva	Not in house							Vishnupriyaa; Yashmi	Prithviraj	Nikhil; Vishnupriyaa	Not eligible	Yashmi	Walked (Day 69)						
Nayani	Not in house							Vishnupriyaa; Seetha	~~Vishnupriyaa~~; ~~Vishnupriyaa~~	Mehaboob; Nikhil	Not eligible	Evicted (Day 63)							
Mehaboob	Not in house							Seetha; Yashmi	Mega; Chief	Hariteja; Nayani	Evicted (Day 56)								
Manikanta	Vishnupriyaa; ~~Shekar~~	Aditya; Shekar	Aditya	Yashmi; Prithviraj	Prithviraj; Aditya	Nominated	Nainika; Yashmi; Nikhil	Mehaboob; Gangavva	Nikhil	Walked (Day 49)				Nikhil; Nabeel					
Seetha	~~Prerana~~; Bebakka	Nikhil; Prerana	Shekar	Yashmi; Prithviraj	Prerana; Manikanta	House; Chief		Mehaboob; Gangavva	Evicted (Day 42)					Prerana; Yashmi					
Nainika	House; Chief		Aditya	Soniya; Prerana	Manikanta; Aditya	Soniya	Nabeel; Vishnupriyaa; Nikhil	Evicted (Day 35)						Nabeel; Yashmi					
Aditya	~~Prithiviraj~~; Shekar	Abhay; Shekar	Nominated	Vishnupriyaa; Manikanta	Prithviraj; Soniya	Manikanta	Nainika; Vishnupriyaa; Nikhil	Evicted (Day 32)						Yashmi; Prerana					
Soniya	Bebakka; ~~Prerana~~	Nainika; Seetha	Aditya	Nainika; Yashmi	Nabeel; Aditya	Nominated	Evicted (Day 28)							Prerana; Nikhil					
Abhay	Manikanta; ~~Bebakka~~	Vishnupriya; Aditya	House; Chief		Evicted (Day 21)														
Shekar	Manikanta; ~~Bebakka~~	Manikanta; Aditya	Nominated	Evicted by Housemates (Day 14)										Prerana; Yashmi					
Bebakka	Prithviraj; ~~Nabeel~~	Evicted (Day 7)												Prithviraj; Nikhil					
Notes	1, 2	3, 4	5	6	1, 7	8	9, 10	1, 11, 12	1, 13, 14, 15	1, 16, 17, 18	1, 19	1, 20, 21	1, 22, 23	1, 24	1, 25, 26		26, 27	-	
Against Public Vote	Bebakka; Manikanta; Prithviraj; Shekar; Soniya; Vishnupriyaa	Aditya; Manikanta; Nainika; Nikhil; ~~Prerana~~; Prithviraj; Seetha; Shekar; Vishnupriyaa	Aditya; Shekar	Abhay; Manikanta; Nainika; Prerana; Prithviraj; Seetha; Vishnupriyaa; Yashmi	Aditya; Manikanta; ~~Nainika~~; Soniya; Prerana; Prithviraj; Nabeel	Manikanta; Soniya	Aditya; Manikanta; Nabeel; Nainika; Nikhil; Vishnupriyaa	Gangavva; Mehaboob; Prithviraj; Seetha; Vishnupriyaa; Yashmi	~~Avinash~~; Gautham; Hariteja; Manikanta; Nabeel; Nikhil; Prerana; Prithviraj; Teja; Yashmi	~~Hariteja~~; Mehaboob; Nayani; Nikhil; Prerana; Prithviraj; Vishnupriyaa	Gautham; Hariteja; Teja; Yashmi; Nayani	Gautham; Hariteja; Nikhil; Prerana; Prithviraj; ~~Rohini~~; Vishnupriyaa; Yashmi	Avinash; Gautham; Prithviraj; Teja; Vishnupriyaa; Yashmi	Nabeel; Nikhil; Prerana; Prithviraj; Yashmi	~~Avinash~~; Gautham; Nabeel; Nikhil; Prerana; Prithviraj; Teja; Vishnupriyaa		Gautham; Nabeel; Nikhil; Prerana; Rohini; Vishnupriyaa	Avinash; Gautham; Nabeel; Nikhil; Prerana	
Walked	None								Manikanta	Avinash	None	Gangavva	None						
Re-entered	None								None	Avinash	None								
Evicted	Bebakka	Shekar		Abhay	Soniya		Aditya	Seetha	No; Eviction	Mehaboob	Nayani	Hariteja	Eviction; Cancelled	Yashmi	Teja		Rohini	Avinash	Prerana
Evicted	Bebakka	Shekar		Abhay	Soniya		Aditya	Seetha	No; Eviction	Mehaboob	Nayani	Hariteja	Eviction; Cancelled	Yashmi	Teja		Rohini	Nabeel	Gautham
Evicted	Bebakka	Shekar		Abhay	Soniya		Nainika	Seetha	No; Eviction	Mehaboob	Nayani	Hariteja	Eviction; Cancelled	Yashmi	Prithviraj		Vishnupriyaa	Nikhil	

indicates the returning housemate from previous season
indicates that the contestant was a guest entrant.
indicates that the housemate was directly nominated for eviction.
indicates that the housemate was immune prior to nominations.
indicates that the housemate has been evicted.
indicates that the housemate walked out due to emergency.
indicates the chief.

=== Nomination notes ===
- ^1: Chiefs housemates were immune from this week's nominations.
- ^2: In week 1, housemates had to nominate two housemates each, but the Chiefs had the power to decide which one of their two nominations to be accepted.
- ^3: Chief, was immune from this week's nominations and had the power to save one nominated housemate and directly nominate one housemate.
- ^4: In week 2, housemates had to nominate two housemates from any other two clans.
- ^5: Based on the public vote, the bottom two nominated housemates faced the housemates' eviction vote.
- ^6: Housemates were not eligible to nominate Chiefs in this week's nominations. But the two Chiefs had to mutually decide to nominate one of them, they chose Abhay.
- ^7: Chief Nikhil had the power to save one nominated housemate. He chose Nainika.
- ^8: Based on the Hero & Zero task, Manikanta received the most votes as Zero and was directly in the Bottom two. Based on the public vote, Soniya was in the bottom two. Those two nominated housemates faced the housemates' eviction vote.
- ^9: In this week's nomination, each housemate had to nominate one of the two Chiefs, Nikhil received more votes and was nominated.
- ^10: This week one housemate was evicted in mid-week eviction.
- ^11: On day 35, Royal Clan housemates won the Nomination Shield and had to mutually decide to give it to one of them. They chose Nayani and she was immune from nominations.
- ^12: In week 6, each Royal clan housemate had to nominate two housemates from the OG clan and OG clan housemates had to mutually nominate two housemates from the Royal clan.
- ^13: In this week's nomination, Hariteja and Prerana were chosen as killer girls by Bigg Boss. Other housemates had to race to the platforms, two housemates had to nominate one housemate, and killer girls had to race to grab the cowboy hat first. Then the killer girl had to accept one nomination and cancel one nomination. As Hariteja grabbed the cowboy hat more time, Prerana was nominated.
- ^14: On day 43, Royal Clan housemates used their Immunity Shield. They had to mutually decide to swap one nominated housemate from their clan. They chose to save Avinash and nominated Hariteja.
- ^15: On Day 49, Manikanta decided to voluntary exit, which canceled that week's eviction.
- ^16: In this week's nomination, Royal Clan housemates had the Nomination Shield and Mega Chief Gautam had to decide to give it to one of them. He chose Hariteja. And for every nomination vote, 50 thousand would be deducted from prize money.
- ^17: Mega Chief Gautam had the power to save one nominated housemate. He chose Hariteja.
- ^18: On Day 56, Avinash left the house for a medical check up and returned the same day.
- ^19: Mega Chief Vishnupriyaa had the power to nominate five housemates and lock them in the Jail. Then the save housemates had to race to grab the Jail key, in five rounds the housemate with the key saved one housemate from the Jail and nominated one housemate to replace in the Jail.
- ^20: In this week's nomination, housemates could nominate only one housemate. Mega Chief, Avinash had the power to save one nominated housemate and directly nominate one housemate.
- ^21: On Day 69, due to a medical issue Gangavva left the house.
- ^22: In this week's nomination, housemates had to race to grab the paintbrush, in five rounds the housemate with the paintbrush to nominate one housemate.
- ^23: On Day 77, Nabeel used Eviction Shield on Avinash. As Avinash received the fewest votes in the public vote, eviction was canceled.
- ^24: In this week's nomination, evicted housemates returned to nominate two housemates.
- ^25: On Day 84, Evicted housemate Yashmi received the Bigg Bomb Power to nominate either Gautam or Nikhil before leaving (this counted as one nomination vote in next week's nominations).
- ^26: Avinash winning the ticket to finale task went directly to finale * ^27: In this week's nomination, all housemates except Finalist Avinash were nominated. Later Finalist Avinash had to choose to keep one nominated housemate unsafe, then that housemate choosing another nominated until two housemates remain. Nabeel and Prerana were given a chance to buy the second spot in the Final by bidding money from the winner's cash prize, but both decided to cancel their bid and remained nominated.

== Related shows ==
=== Bigg Boss 8 Buzzz ===
Bigg Boss 8 Buzzz is an Indian Telugu-language television talk show in which the host interviews the eliminated contestants. The show premiered on 9 September 2024 on Star Maa Music and unaired portions of episodes are streamed on Disney+ Hotstar and aired on Star Maa Music.
