= Pove Pora =

- Genre: Game show
- Directed by: Prasanna Palanki; Srinivas Bodem; Santosh Errolla
- Presented by: Sudigali Sudheer; Vishnu priya
- Opening theme: Main title
- Country of origin: India
- Original language: Telugu
- No. of seasons: Season 1
- No. of episodes: 134

Production
- Producer: Mallemala Entertainments
- Production locations: Annapurna Studios; Ramanaidu Studios
- Editors: Anil Reddy Ammireddy; Mallesh kummari
- Running time: 41-43 Minutes
- Production company: Mallemala Entertainments

Original release
- Network: ETV Plus
- Release: 20 July 2017 – present

Pove Pora (Telugu: పోవే పోరా) is an Indian youth game show that telecasted on ETV Plus produced by Mallemala Entertainments. The First episode aired on 20 July 2017. The show became an instant hit and received well by audience. This youth game show focuses on competition, debate, quiz between boys and girls on various topics and one with highest points will be announced as winners of the episode.

The show is hosted by Sudigali Sudheer and Anchor Vishnupriya. The boys' side is supported and led by Sudheer and the girls' side is supported and led by Vishnupriya. Hosts also seen performing for Intro songs which has separate fan base. Apart from encouraging their sides, the hosts always seen doing comedy by making comedy punches on each other.

The show telecasts on ETV Plus on Saturdays at 08.00 PM IST. All episodes of the show are fully available on official YouTube channel of ETV Plus Network . The shows has good number of views on YouTube garnering at least one million views for each episodes. The show completed its 100th Episode on 15 June 2019.

== Hosts ==
Name	Role	Description
Sudigali Sudheer	Host	Sudheer is as usual very energetic throughout the show. He continues to carry his comedy timing and dialogue delivery superbly.He is very sportive speaking of amount of comedy punches on him.His performance in intro songs presents his dance skills.He always carries his style throughout the show.Very lovable, laughable and soulful presence felt on the screen.
Vishnupriya	Host	Vishnupriya being a debutant on Television does not shy away from expressing herself on screen. Her presentation on screen made her popular in a short span of time.Very Energetic, talented and talkative throughout the show. Her performance in intro songs well appreciated by audience.Being a lovely girl on screen, she keeps her side and audience cheerful.Her voice and Nose are always bags of comedy punches.

== Format ==
Rounds in the Game Show
Name	Round	Description
Intro Songs	Beginning / Interval	Intro songs are very popular among pove pora fans. This part of the show involves hosts performing for evergreen and hit telugu songs. Each episode has special performance and varieties of properties are used to recreate same magic and visualization as it used to be portrayed in Films. Usually they will be seen performing for melody, romantic and mass songs. List includes old as well as latest songs.
Laddu Kavala Nayana	Warm up Round	This is a ball passing game. In this round when the Music is turned on, the member from boys/girls side holding the ball should throw it on opposite side member. The player should throw the ball to the opposite candidate, so that ball should be pass from one side to other and vice versa. This should go on until the music stops. The player who is to be found holding the ball at this point should be considered as out and opposite team declared as Winner.The winning side will have a chance to select members from opposite team and should perform according to their instruction.
Why this Kolaveri Di	First round	This round basically a debate. Hosts will start a debate on a topic and presents a view supporting their respective sides.Then members from boys and girls side continue the debate by presenting their thoughts supporting their side and criticizing the opposite members. Sometimes members presents their view in the form of a poem or song.
Jagadame	First round	This round basically a debate. Hosts will start a debate on a topic and presents a view supporting their respective sides.Then members from boys and girls side continue the debate by presenting their thoughts supporting their side and criticizing the opposite members. Sometimes members presents their view in the form of a poem or song.
Chal Maar	First/Second Round	This round is a puzzle game. Four members each from boys and girls side will be called upon to center stage.Selection of members will be based on funny revenges which they have opposite team members.Then Host will ask a puzzle question and member who presses buzzer first and answers correctly will be awarded a point to their side. Winning member has a chance to select a member from opposite team and take revenge by throwing water balloons or colors.
Ayyo Ayyo Ayyayyo	Second/Third Round	This round basically is a quiz round. Each member from Boys side and Girls side will be called up on to center stage. They have to face one question asked by host. The member who presses buzzer first and answer correctly will get a chance to pick chits placed in bowl. It contains point and winning team will have an opportunity to push opposite team member into mini pool.
Shek Shekala	Third round	This round requires boys and girls pose for a picture as it is as displayed on screen and they turn into statues for the next thirty seconds.If they caught moving or pose not in tandem with picture will be out of the game.The team with more statues posing perfect picture at the end of stipulated time are winners of the round.
Box Baddalai Podi	Third round	This is a balloon sit and pop game. Boys and Girls side assigned with number of inflated balloons with specific color. When the game starts, the players try to pop the balloon by sitting on it. The players may hold the balloon with their hands to steady it, but may not use their fingernails to pop it, otherwise it is considered as Foul.Each point will be awarded to pop balloons. The team with highest points which pop their balloons from sitting on it Wins.

Currently Running Discontinued

== Episodes ==
The episodes are usually one hour show with commercials. In the beginning, show was aired on every Thursday from 8:00 PM to 9:00 PM. From 1 March 2018, show moved to Friday telecasted on same time slot. Show again rescheduled on 16 March 2019 and currently air from 8:00 PM to 9:00 PM on Saturday. The format included a scripted act from the hosts in the initial segment followed by three segments that include debate, quiz and game. The first 25 episodes began with three segments. Later on Intro songs were included. The format of the show continue to be same with changes only in three rounds.

=== Special Episodes ===
Episode	Telecast Date	Event	Description
Episode No.14	19 October 2017	Diwali Celebration	This was diwali special episode of Pove Pora. Host Sudheer attired in traditional White Dhoti and Puncha. Vishnupriya dressed in classical Indian festival saree attire. Episode had three segments. Episode ended by bursting crackers on diwali occasion.
Episode No.50	29 June 2018	50 Episode Celebration	The show completed its 50th Episode. Host Sudheer and Vishnupriya gave their special entry. Episode continued with three segments. Host along with students celebrated by cutting cake and hosts presented Pove Pora Special Mug to the entertainers of the episode.
Episode No.75	21 December 2018	75 Episode Celebration	Team celebrated its 75th Episode. Patas Fame Anchor Sreemukhi and Dhee Fame Varshini were part of this special episode. First round conducted by Sudheer and Vishnupriya. Second round done by Sudheer and Varshini. Last round conducted by Sudheer and Sreemukhi. Sudheer also performed for special songs with Varshini and Sreemukhi. Episode ended by cutting cake by hosts and guests.
Episode No.88	23 March 2019	Ravi and Sreemukhi as Guests	Patas Fame Anchor Ravi and Sreemukhi joined this special episode as guests. They hosted a part of the episode and conducted Patas famous round 'Punch Pataka' in this episode.
Episode No.96	18 May 2019	Sudheer Pre Birthday Celebrations	This episode happened to be a Pre Birthday Celebration for the host Sudheer whose birthday falls on 19 May. The Pove Pora team planned this surprise event by celebrating it with Children from an NGO. This event also graced by his parents and sister in law.
Episode No.100	15 June 2019	100 Episode Celebration	The show completed its 100th Episode.The team celebrated it in a grand way. Host Sudheer and Vishnupriya gave their grand entry to episode celebrations. Patas Fame Nookaraju and Faheema joined show supporting boys and girls. Episode continued with three segments. Host along with students celebrated by cutting cake and episode ended on a high note.
Episode No.104	13 July 2019	Sampoornesh Babu as Guest	This episode witnessed appearance of Actor Sampoornesh Babu. Sampoornesh Babu and his team from upcoming movie 'Kobbari Matta' appeared to promote their project in Pove Pora. Host Sudheer along with Sampoornesh Babu performed a scene from Kobbari Matta .
Episode No.105	20 July 2019	Sudheer's Brother and Vishnupriya's Sister as Guest	This special episode of Pove Pora presented Rohan (Sudheer's Brother) and Pavani (Vishnupriya's Sister) as Guest hosts. They hosted third round 'Ayyo Ayyo Ayyayyo'.They also performed for a special song.
Episode No.113	14 September 2019	Actors Mahesh and Bhadram as Guests	This episode witnessed appearance of Actors Mahesh and Bhadram. Both came to promote their upcoming movie Nenu Naa Nagarjuna in Pove Pora. They have entertained the students by participating in the last round.
Episode No.115	28 September 2019	Twin pairs of students	This episode witnessed appearance of twins as students for the first time in the history of Telugu Small Screen.
Episode No.117	12 October 2019	Getup Srinu and Ramprasad	This special episode of Pove Pora have featured the team of film 3Monkeys 2019 which also features Sudigali Sudheer. The film's Director Anil, Actress Karunya, Actors Getup Srinu and Ramprasad have entertained the students by participating in 2nd and 3rd rounds.

== Trivia ==
- The show is a Debut show for both Sudigali Sudheer and Vishnupriya as Television Host.
- Pove Pora is Sudigali Sudheer's fourth show with 'Mallemala Entertainments' after Jabardasth, Extra Jabardasth and Dhee Ultimate Dance Show.
- The show was directed by Santosh Errolla for almost 97 episodes. Currently show jointly directed by Prasanna Palanki and Srinivas Bodem.
- Sound technician of the show popularly called as 'Samba' by hosts is well known for audio skills.
- From episode 100 the makers have added two new actors Nukaraju and Fahima from Patas team. These two entertain the students with their different getups and actions in every episode.

== See also ==
- Jabardasth
- Extra Jabardasth
- Dhee Ultimate Dance Show
