= Jabardasth =

Jabardasth may refer to:

- Jabardasth (film), a 2013 Indian Telugu-language film by B.V. Nandini Reddy
- Jabardasth (TV series), a weekly comedy show on the ETV (Telugu) channel
  - Extra Jabardasth, an extended edition of the weekly comedy show

== See also ==
- Zabardast, a 1985 Indian film
- Zabardast (2007 film), an Indian film
