= Banthi Poola Janaki =

- Directed by: Nellutla Praveen Chander
- Written by: Sekhar Vikkhayth
- Produced by: Kalyani-Ram
- Starring: Dhanraj; Diksha Panth
- Cinematography: G.L. Babu
- Edited by: Siva Y Prasad
- Music by: Bhole
- Release date: 26 August 2016
- Country: India
- Language: Telugu

Banthi Poola Janaki is a 2016 Indian Telugu comedy thriller film directed by Nellutla Praveen Chander. It was produced by Kalyani-Ram under Ujwala Creations. The film features Dhanraj and Diksha Panth in the lead roles and supported by actors from the popular comedy show Jabardasth.

== Plot ==
Janaki is an actress who gets a national award for her latest film Banthipoola Janaki. To celebrate her award, the film's hero Akash, writer Miriyalu, producer Bangarayya and director Ahamkaram plan to surprise Janaki. They gang up at a bungalow and begin their celebrations. In a shocking twist, they all die accidentally in the hands of Janaki. The rest of the story is all about how Janaki escapes from these murders with the help of her friend and manager Shyam.

== Cast ==
- Dhanraj as Shyam, Janaki's Manager
- Diksha Panth as Janaki, Film Actress
- Chammak Chandra as Ahamkaram, Film Director
- Sudigali Sudheer as Akash, An actor (Hero)
- Rocket Raghava as Miriyalu, Film Writer
- Shakalaka Shankar
- Bharath Reddy
- Raghu Karumanchi as Bangarayya, Film Producer

== Production ==
=== Casting ===
The majority of the actors are from the popular TV show Jabardasth.

=== Filming ===
The film was formally launched in Hyderabad on 10 February 2016. The entire film was completed in single schedule.

== Release ==
After clearing the censor it was awarded 'U/A' Certificate from the CBFC and was released on 26 August 2016.

== Marketing ==
Title logo of the film was launched on 18 January 2016 by Malayalam Super star Mohanlal. The film's theatrical trailer was released on 21 May 2016.

== Soundtrack ==
Banthi Poola Janaki

Film score by Bhole
- Released: 29 July 2016
- Recorded: 2016
- Genre: Soundtrack
- Length: 23:31
- Label: Mango Music
- Producer: Bhole

The music was composed by Bhole and all the songs were written by Kasarla Shyam. Music released on Mango Music Company. Audio launch event of the movie was held at Shilpakala Vedika, Hyderabad on 29 July 2016. Actor Ram attended the audio launch function as chief guest and released the audio CD. Regina, Sampoornesh Babu, Tanish, Nandini Reddy and other prominent cast and crew of the film graced the event .

No.	Title	Lyrics	Singer(s)	Length
1.	"Banthi Poola Janaki"	Kasarla Shyam	Bhole	4:07
2.	"Kannelle Tolisari"	Kasarla Shyam	Swarag	3:56
3.	"Bhoom Shakalaka"	Kasarla Shyam	Spoorthy, Varam	3:02
4.	"Banthi Poola Janaki- Dhanraj"	Kasarla Shyam	Dhanraj, Bhole	4:07
5.	"Kannelle Tolisari (Female)"	Kasarla Shyam	Varam	3:48
6.	"Jabardasthla"	Kasarla Shyam	Varam, Bhole	4:22
Total length:				23:05

== Reception ==
123telugu.com gave the film 2.25 stars out of 5 and called it a "boring thriller". Indiaglitz.com gave the film 1.5 stars out of 5.
