= Varshini Sounderajan =

Indian actress and television presenter

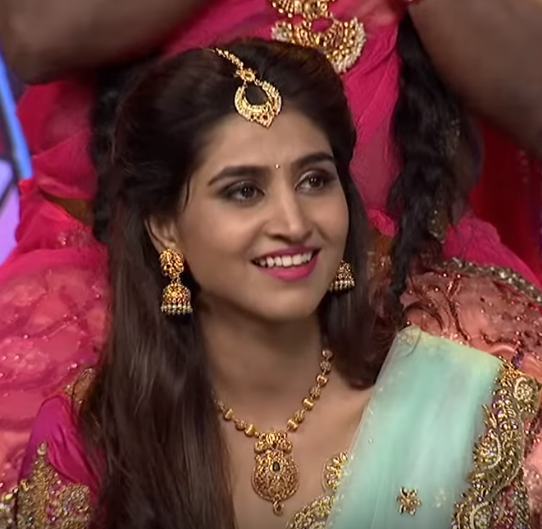
- Varshini at a television event
- Born: Varshini Sounderajan; 6 April 1994 (age 32); Hyderabad, Telangana, India
- Occupations: Actress; model; television presenter

Varshini Sounderajan is an Indian actor, model, and television presenter who appears in Telugu films.

== Early life and career ==
Varshini was born in Hyderabad in 1994 to a Tamil family. Varshini is the youngest one in her family followed by her sister, Soujanya and brother, Prashanth. She attended the St Francis School. Then she completed a bachelor's degree in electronics at St. Francis Degree and PG college, affiliated by Osmania University, Hyderabad.

Varshini started her career as a model, but soon turned to acting, making her film debut in Chandamama Kathalu (2014), which won the National Film Award for Best Feature Film in Telugu.

She is known for performances in the Telugu films Lovers, Kai Raja Kai, and Sri Rama Raksha. She played the lead in the Viu web series Pelli Gola, alongside Abijeet, produced by Annapurna Studios. The series was successful, and she starred in the next two seasons. She was as a team leader in the television program Dhee. Varshini was listed in the first edition of the Hyderabad Times feature, "Most Desirable Woman on Television, 2017." She has also been an anchor on the television program Pataas 2. In 2022, she starred in a Telugu film, Malli Modalaindi, alongside the Telugu actor Sumanth. The film received positive reviews, especially for Varshini's performance. Varshini was also the host of a popular Telugu television show, Comedy Stars on Star Maa.

She appeared in the 2023 film Shaakuntalam, directed by Gunasekhar. On 15 November 2018, she hosted the popular Telugu television comedy show Jabardast.

In September 2026, she entered the house as a contestant on the tenth season of the Telugu reality show Bigg Boss, hosted by Nagarjuna on Star Maa.

== Filmography ==
=== Films ===
| Year | Film | Role | Notes |
|---|---|---|---|
| 2014 | Chandamama Kathalu | Renu | |
| 2014 | Lovers | Soumya | |
| 2015 | Best Actors | Archana | |
| 2018 | Nannu Dochukunduvate | Satya | |
| 2019 | Jodi | Madhu priya | |
| 2022 | Malli Modalaindi | Nisha | |
| 2023 | Shaakuntalam | Sanumathi | |
| 2024 | Bhoothaddam Bhaskar Narayana | Rudraveni | |

=== Web series ===
| Year | Series | Role | Notes |
|---|---|---|---|
| 2017-2019 | Pelli Gola | Jagadamba | 3 seasons |

=== Television ===
| Title | Role | Notes |
|---|---|---|
| Pattas 2 | Co-Host | |
| Comedy Stars | Anchor | |
| Sixth Sense S4 | Herself (Guest) | |
| Bhale Chancele | Herself (Guest) | |
| Jabardasth | Anchor | |
| Alitho Saradaga | Herself (Guest) | |
| Bigg Boss Telugu 10 | Contestant | |
