= Shekar Basha =

Indian radio jockey

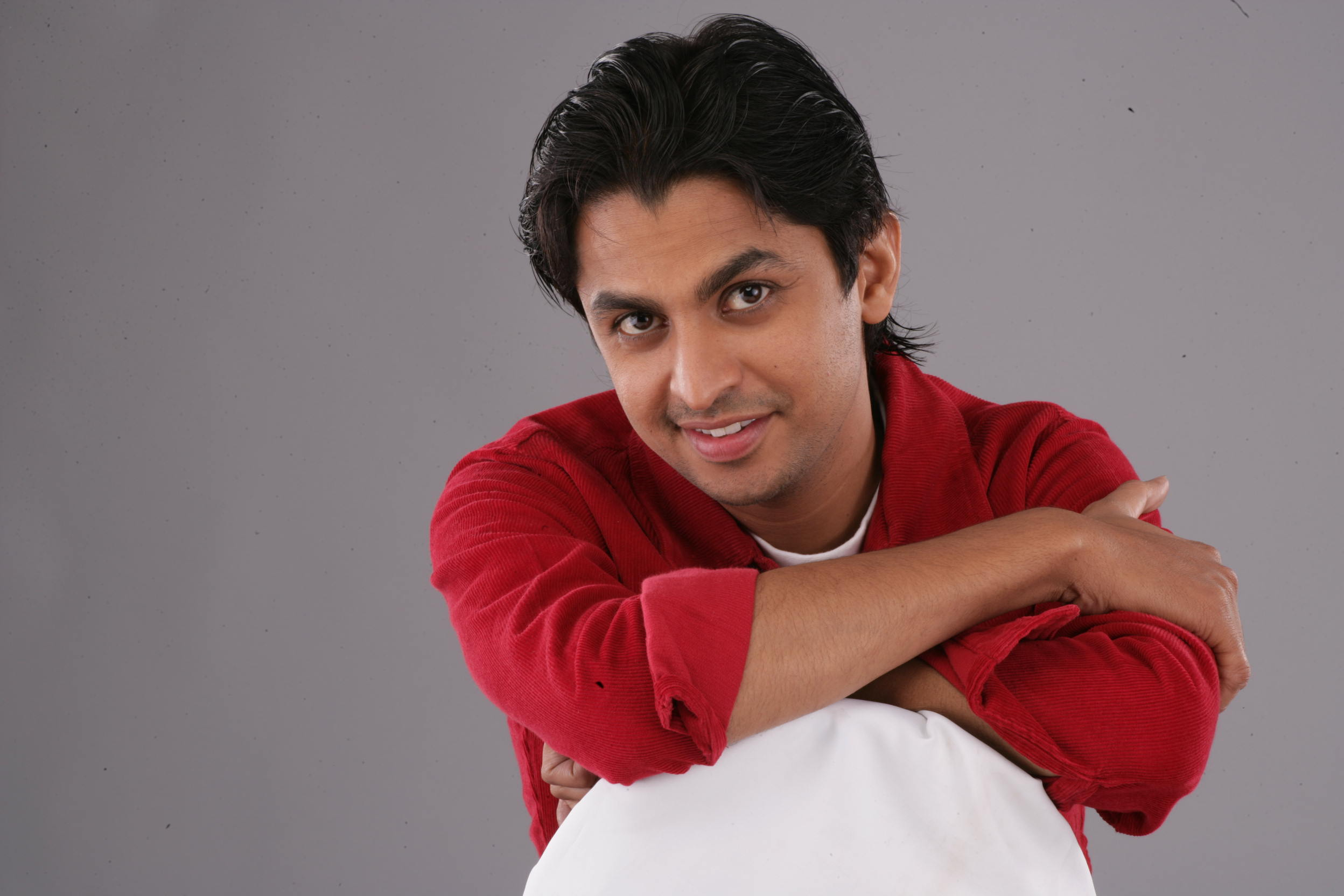
- Born: Gudimella Raja Sekhar; Kakinada, Andhra Pradesh, India
- Occupations: Actor, director, television presenter, radio jockey
- Years active: 2005–present
- Awards: India Radio Forum's "RJ of the Year 2017" and 19 more.
- Website: www.shekarbasha.com

Shekar Basha is an Indian radio jockey. He is the only RJ in India to have won the Excellence in Radio Award 18 times, India's most prestigious award for a radio jockey.The Latest being The most influential "RJ of the year 2026".According to a survey conducted by The Times of India (TOI) published on 18 May 2018, he is one of the "top 10 Most Desirable Men on Television". TOI termed him as "The original radio guru who won tons of applause for his signature brand of infotainment, with equally successful stint on TV". As a VJ, he received Best Video Jockey of the year 2016 of Padma Mohana awards held at Ravindra Bharathi, Hyderabad on 23 August 2016.

== Career ==
=== Early phase (2005–2007) ===
Basha started his career as a video jockey on Gemini Music, an Indian Telugu music channel, on 10 April 2005. He hosted more than 3,000 live shows on the channel, but he received acclaim for his role in Hi Bujji, a kids theme based TV show, and SundayHum-Sandeham, a live comedy show based on Guru-Sishya theme.

=== Breakthrough ===
In November 2006 he joined Red FM 93.5 (then S FM). He hosted "Thellarindoy Mama" (Breakfast Show) and "Guroo Hoja Shuro" (Afternoon Band). The latter won "The Best Program of the Year-2007" Award at India Radio Forum. He also introduced the phrase "kevvu keka" to the industry. It became so popular that both films and TV programs were titled after it, including films and lyrics of films' songs (such as Pawan Kalyan's Gabbar Singh and Allari Naresh's movie) as well as their film dialogues.

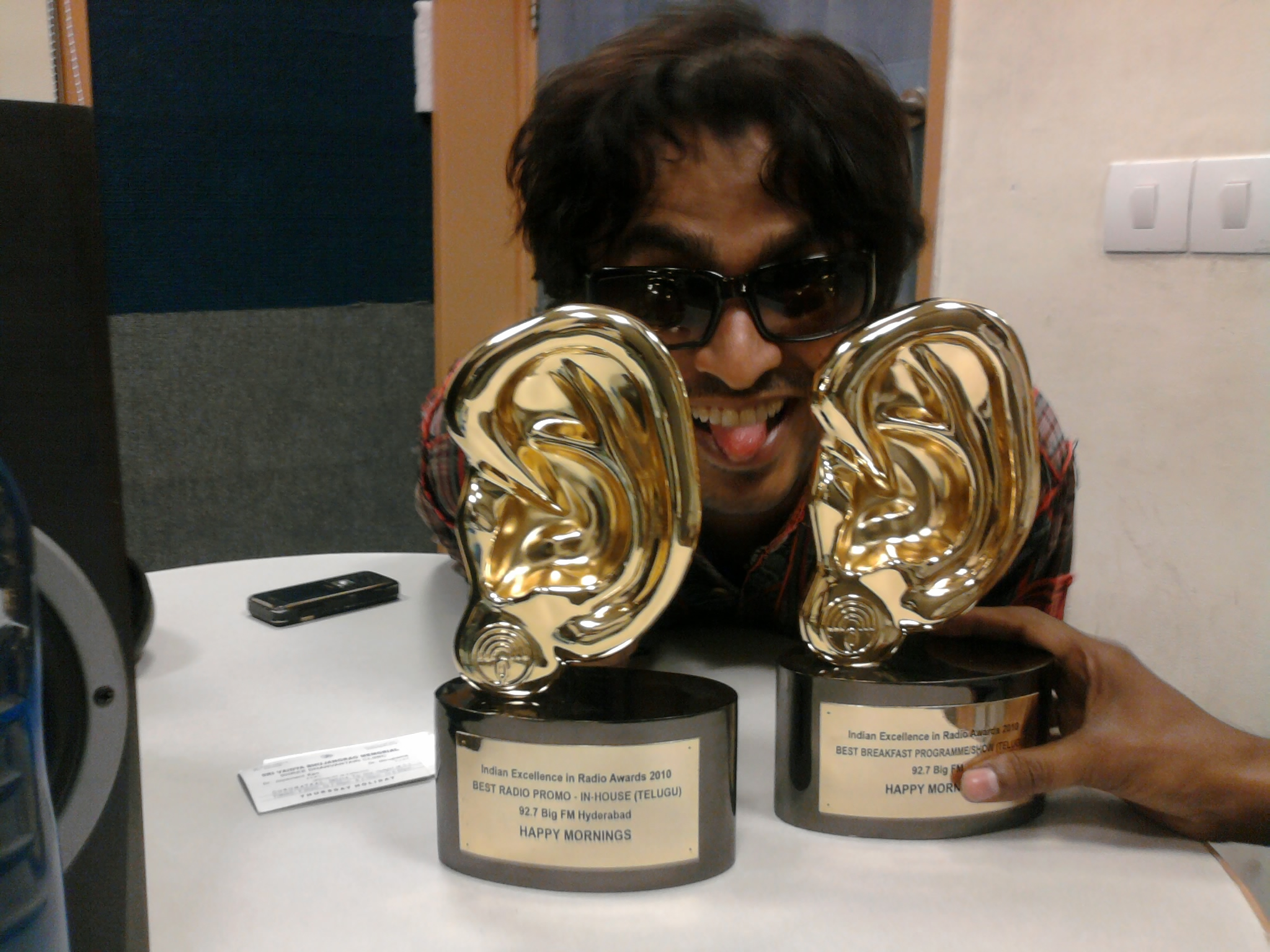
RJ Shekar IRF Award Winning pose

=== Success (2007–present) ===
In August 2007 Shekar moved from Red FM 93.5 to Big FM. There he took charge of the show "Big Sandadi" which was until then hosted by the very popular Telugu TV anchor and film actress, Jhansi (TV anchor). On 27 May 2008 the show was named the Best Radio Show of the Year by IRF. Shekar has a habit of saying "Happy mornings" instead of "Good morning", which caught on quickly with the listeners. As a result, in 2009 the program was renamed as "Happy Mornings". After the formation of the state of Telangana, the show was renamed as "Sallaam Telangana" reflecting the pride of the state, and the show was awarded the "best breakfast show (Telugu) 2017". In addition to radio and video jockeying, Shekar also produced award-winning promos and Humor capsule sparklers which include the radio humour capsules "Kotigadu & Raogaru", BigBaba, Sangeetham Mastar, Google Gurooji, and Anandam Paramaanandam.

=== Awards and Records ===
Shekar holds the record for winning the highest number of India Radio Forum awards with a total of 18 awards from 2007 to 2019.

His other awards include:

- Most Influential RJ of the Year 2026 from Herald Global & BARC Asia."
- Best Video Jockey - 2016 for his show "F-club" in Gemini Music.
- Santhosham Cine Magazine's "Best Radio Jockey for 2014".
- Young Communicator Award for 2010 from International School of Business Management.

He trained in radio jockeying at MICA (institute) (Mudra Institute of Communications), Ahmadabad.

=== Marathons ===
As of 2026 Shekar has hosted Four marathon radio jockeying feats: along with a VJ marathon.

- 92.7 hours non-stop, the first stunt of its kind on Telugu radio, in September 2007, which created huge buzz in the city and helped radio as a whole to grow in Hyderabad.
- 100 hours on-wheels, from 12 to 16 August 2008, live on-air from a mobile studio in an attempt to achieve the feat of non-stop radio jockeying, towards peace in the city and with a purpose to highlight the importance of all to stay together and support each other in times of high alert where society is being challenged constantly by people wanting to wreak havoc.
- 106 hours on-wheels, from 7am on 26 January 2016 to 5pm on 30 January 2016, with a purpose to highlight the importance of using mobile Internet.
- 72 hrs non-stop Rjing from 13 August 2018 7am to 16 August 2018 7am to raise awareness on the effects of using disposable plastic products.
- 24 hrs non-stop live VJ marathon at Gemini Music for the 2026 NewYear special progaram.

=== Movie debut ===
Shekar made his debut as an actor with the movie "Welcome Obama", directed by veteran director Singeetam Srinivasa Rao. He directed the movie "Vethika nenu naa ishtamga". He played a director in the movie Panchamukhi directed by Challa Bhanu Kiran, which was released in 2014.

== Filmography ==
- Welcome Obama (2013) as Subramanyam (son-in-law & purohit)
- Vethika Nenu Naa Ishtamga (2014) as Basha bhai (Don)
- Pancha Mukhi (2014) as Aspiring Director
- Naa... Nuvve (2018) as RJ

=== Television ===
Year	Title	Role	Network	Notes	Ref(s)
2024	Bigg Boss 8	Contestant	Star Maa	Evicted Day 14	
