= Katha Kanchiki Manam Intiki =

- Directed by: Chanakya Chinna
- Written by: Chanakya Chinna
- Produced by: Monish Pathipati
- Starring: Thrigun; Pujita Ponnada; Vinod Kumar Alva; Mahesh Manjrekar
- Cinematography: Y S Krishna
- Edited by: Prawin Pudi
- Music by: Bheems Ceciroleo
- Production company: MP Arts
- Release date: 8 April 2022
- Running time: 140 minutes
- Country: India
- Language: Telugu

Katha Kanchiki Manam Intiki (transl. The tale goes to Kanchi and we go home) is a 2022 Indian Telugu-language comedy horror film directed and written by Chanakya Chinna and produced by Monish Pathipati under the banner of MP Arts.The film stars Thrigun, Pujitha Ponnada, Mahesh Manjrekar and Vinod Kumar Alva in the lead roles and was released on 8 April 2022.

== Plot ==
'Katha Kanchiki Manam Intiki' is the story of four people from different strata of society. Prem (Thrigun) is a young man who feels that there is no love in life and no marriage luck in his name. Daksha (Pujita Ponnada) is a girl who takes whatever risk is put for the purpose of the bet. Kannayya ('Getup' Sreenu) is a petty thief with a disability. Nandi ('Mirchi' R.J. Hemanth) is a writer. The four of them go to the cemetery one night for different reasons and introduce each other in fear. Then all four go to the bungalow next to the cemetery. What happens to these four people forms the crux of the story.

== Cast ==
- Thrigun as Prem
- Pujita Ponnada as Daksha
- Mahesh Manjrekar
- Vinod Kumar Alva
- RJ Hemanth
- Getup Srinu
- Saptagiri
- Shyamala
- Sahiti

== Soundtrack ==
Katha Kanchiki Manam Intiki

Soundtrack album by Bheems Ceciroleo
- Released: 2022
- Genre: Feature film soundtrack
- Length: 17:10
- Producer: Monish Pattipati

Bheems Ceciroleo chronology
Suraapanam (2022)	Katha Kanchiki Manam Intiki (2022)	Gaalodu (2022)

Bheems Ceciroleo scored the film's background music and Srinivasa Teja composed for its soundtrack, also writing lyrics for all track. The soundtrack album consists of 4 tracks.

Track list
No.	Title	Lyrics	Artist(s)	Length
1.	"Katha Kanchiki Manam Intiki Title Song"	Srinivas Teja		3:31
2.	"Kaatikaapari"	Srinivas Teja		5:05
3.	"Okati Rendu Moodu"	Srinivas Teja	Adith Arun	4:17
4.	"Bekari Bathukuro"	Srinivas Teja		4:17
Total length:				17:10

== Reception ==
A critic from The Times of India called the film "an engaging ride".
