= Software Sudheer =

2019 Telugu romantic comedy film

- Film poster
- Directed by: Rajashekar Reddy
- Produced by: K. Shekhar Raju
- Starring: Sudigali Sudheer; Dhanya Balakrishna; Nassar; Sayaji Shinde; Indraja; Sanjay Swaroop
- Cinematography: C. Ramprasad
- Edited by: Gautham Raju
- Music by: Bheems Ceciroleo
- Release date: 28 December 2019
- Running time: 117 minutes
- Country: India
- Language: Telugu

Software Sudheer is a 2019 Indian Telugu-language romantic comedy film directed by P Rajasekhar Reddy and produced by K Sekhar Raju under Sekhara Art Creations banner. The cast includes Sudigali Sudheer and Dhanya Balakrishna. Bheems scored music. The film was released on 28 December 2019. It opened to mixed reviews from the critics.

== Plot ==
Chandu (Sudigali Sudheer) is a software employee who is a happy-go-lucky guy. He loves his colleague Swathi (Dhanya Balakrishna) and they both decides to get married. But unfortunately they come to know about Chandu’s horoscope. It says he will get killed soon. So as a precautionary measure they decides to do pooja with the help of Swamiji. But at the same time, Chandu gets involved in a 1000Cr scam. With a problem after problem, Chandu is now on a mission to prove his innocence and come out of that problem in horoscope.

== Cast ==
- Sudigali Sudheer as Chandu
- Dhanya Balakrishna as Swathi
- Nassar as Rajanna
- Sayaji Shinde as Chandu’s father
- Indraja as Chandu’s mother
- Sanjay Swaroop as supporting actor
- Posani Krishna Murali as Chandu’s uncle
- Ravi Kale as Dubai Don
- Prudhvi Raj as Doctor

== Soundtrack ==
The soundtrack of the film is produced by Bheems. The official soundtrack of Software Sudheer consisting of five songs was composed by Bheems Ceciroleo, the lyrics of which were written by Suresh Upadhyaya, Bheemas Ceciroleo, and Gaddar. The soundtrack was released on 25 December 2019 at Prasad Labs, Hyderabad with the film's cast and crew in attendance.

No.	Title	Lyrics	Artist(s)	Length
1.	"Intha Andame"	Suresh Upadhyaya	Bheems Ceciroleo	5:06
2.	"Ayyayyo"	Bheemas Ceciroleo	Bheems Ceceroleo, Swathireddy	4:56
3.	"Meluko Raithanna"	Gaddar	Gaddar	2:55
4.	"Coimbatture"	Suresh Upadhyaya	Raghuram, Swathireddy	3:59
5.	"You Are My Identity"	Suresh Upadhyaya	Raghuram

== Reception ==
Software Sudheer received mixed to poor reviews from the critics.

In his review for The Times of India, Thadhagath Pathi rated the film 1.5 stars of 5 A reviewer from NTV stated: "Software Sudheer is about gags that will make you squirm in your seats. Most of the jokes just don't land. Director P Rajasekhar Reddy's efforts to tickle the funny bone end up frustrating the audience. Even the story is told in a rather haphazard manner. The emotional scenes are hardly emotional." 123Telugu.com rated 2.5/5 and wrote: "Software Sudheer is a good launchpad for Sudigali Sudheer and he proves his mettle as a solo hero with his impressive dances and performance."
