= Rashmi Gautam =

Indian actress and television presenter

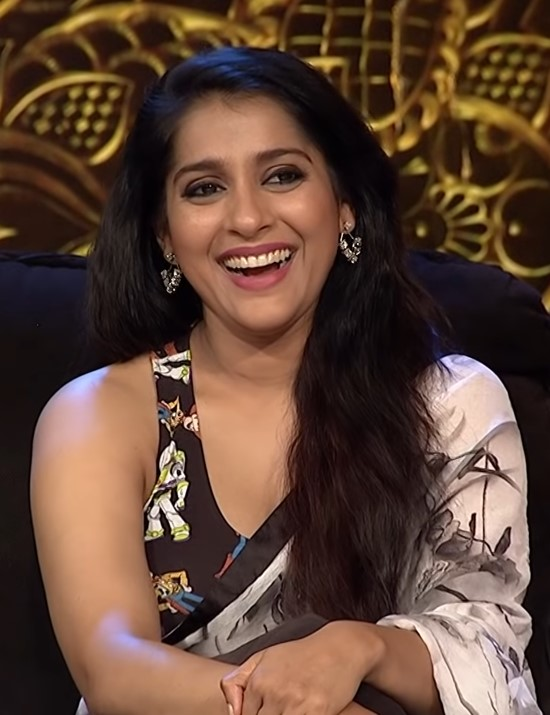
- Gautam in 2019
- Born: Visakhapatnam, Andhra Pradesh, India
- Occupations: Actress, television presenter
- Years active: 2002–present

Rashmi Gautam is an Indian actress and television presenter who appears in Telugu-language films and TV. She hosts the Telugu television comedy show Extra Jabardasth and is a conceptual team leader in reality dance show Dhee.

== Early life and career ==
Gautam was born in a Brahmin family of Visakhapatnam, Andhra Pradesh to an Odia-speaking mother, and a father from Uttar Pradesh.

After appearing in a supporting role in the Telugu 2010 film, Prasthanam, Gautam was spotted by actress Sangeetha at a reality dance show and she referred her to Mugil, who subsequently signed her on to play the lead role of Narmada in the 2011 Tamil Film Kandaen. She also starred in the Kannada film Guru.

== Filmography ==
=== Films ===
- All films are in Telugu unless otherwise noted.

Year	Title	Role	Notes
2002	Holi	Shalu	
2004	Adi c/o ABN College	Jyothsna	
2006	Thanks	Tejaswini	
2009	Current	Geeta	
2009	Evaraina Epudaina	Madhumita's sister	
2009	Well Done Abba	Rashmi	Hindi film
2009	Ganesh Just Ganesh	Archana	
2010	Bindaas	Geeta	
2010	Chalaki	Nandu	
2010	Prasthanam	Nadia	
2011	Kandaen	Narmada	Tamil film
2012	Login	Vrutika	Hindi film
2012	Guru	Ankitha	Kannada film Nominated Best Female Debutant – Kannada in 2nd SIIMA Award
2015	Basthi		Song appearance
2015	Charuseela	Charuseela	
2016	Guntur Talkies	Suvarna	
2016	Rani Gaari Bungalow	Swapna	
2016	Antham	Vanita	
2016	Tanu Vachchenanta	Shruti	
2017	Next Nuvve	Rashmi	
2018	Anthaku Minchi	Madhu Priya	
2019	Sivaranjani	Madhu alias Valli	
2021	30 Rojullo Preminchadam Ela	Herself	Cameo appearance in "Wah Wah Mere Bawa" song
2022	Bomma Blockbuster	Vaani	
2023	Organic Mama Hybrid Alludu	Actress	Cameo appearance
2023	Bhola Shankar		Cameo appearance in Bhola song
2023	Hostel Boys		Telugu version only
2026	Trishanku	Sowmya	

=== Television ===
Year	Title	Role	Notes
2007	Yuva	Swathi	Lead role
2008	Love	Mounica	
2011	Idea Super	Contestant	5th place
2013	Jabardasth	Anchor	
2013	Super Kutumbam	Anchor	
2014	Ragada The Ultimate Dance Show	Anchor	
2014–present	Extra Jabardasth	Anchor	
2016–17	Dhee Jodi – Season 09	Team leader	Runner-up
2017–18	Dhee 10	Team leader	Runner-up
2018	Anubhavinchu Raja	Anchor	
2018	Dhee 10 Special	Anchor and team leader	
2018-19	Dhee Jodi (Season 11)	Team leader	Winner
2019-20	Dhee Champions (Season 12)	Team leader	Winner
2020	Girl Power - Sarileru Manakevvaru	Host	
2020-2021	Dhee Kings Vs Queens (Season 13)	Team leader	Winner
2021	Sixth Sense S4	Herself	Guest
