= Super Subbu =

- Created by: Mallik Ram
- Written by: Mallik Ram; Shivani Dhobal; Ramesh Eligeti
- Directed by: Mallik Ram
- Starring: Sundeep Kishan; Mithila Palkar; Murali Sharma; Manasa Choudhary; Getup Srinu
- Music by: Anudeep Dev
- Country of origin: India
- Original language: Telugu
- No. of seasons: 1
- No. of episodes: 7

Production
- Executive producer: Akshita Akki
- Producers: Rajiv Chilaka; Bharath Laxmipati
- Cinematography: AJ Aaron
- Editor: Viplav Nyshadam
- Camera setup: Multi Camera
- Running time: 35-42 minutes
- Production company: Chilaka Productions

Original release
- Network: Netflix
- Release: 2 July 2026

Super Subbu is a 2026 Netflix original Telugu-language television series written by Shivani Dhobal and Ramesh Eligeti and directed by Mallik Ram. The series stars Sundeep Kishan, Mithila Palkar and Murali Sharma in lead roles.

== Cast ==
- Sundeep Kishan as Chilukuri Subramanya Rao alias Subramanyam "Subbu"
  - Karthikeya Dev as young Subbu
- Mithila Palkar as Swathi
- Murali Sharma as Chilukri Kukkuteswara Rao, "Kukku", Subbu's father
- Manasa Choudhary as Divya, Subbu's fiancée
- Brahmanandam as Madhusudan Rao, School Principal
- Divya Pillai as Rajini
- Kanika Mann as Alekhya, Ramesh Babu's daughter
- Getup Srinu as Kantha Rao
- Goparaju Ramana as Benjamin, Swathi's father
- Hyper Aadi as Madhusudan Rao's brother-in-law
- Raghu Babu as MPDO Lakshman Rao
- Sivannarayana Naripeddi as Swargam Village SI
- Jeevan Kumar as Ramesh Babu
- Gayatri Bhargavi as Ramesh Babu's wife
- Sampoornesh Babu as Sunil, Subbu's maternal uncle
- Gautham Raju as Jambulingam, District Collector
- Ananth Babu as DEO
- Racha Ravi as Peon
- Sujatha Gosukonda as Subbu's mother
- Prem Sagar Rajulapati as Serial Director

== Episodes ==
No.	Title
1	"Subbu S/o Kukku"
Subbu is a man whose life has been controlled by his father, Kukku, ever since Subbu was accidentally caught with an adult magazine in high school by his father, who was also the principal of the school. In the present, Subbu's family arranged a marriage alliance between Subbu and Divya. Subbu is working as a temporary computer lab assistant in a school. Kukku caught Subbu being intimate with Divya, and condemned his behaviour. Kukku demanded that Subbu finds a permanent job else he would cancel the wedding. During an inspection in the school by a government officer who was a classmate of Kukku, students are caught watching an inappropriate video in the computer lab and Subbu is blamed for that. The officer intends to inform Kukku about the incident. The principal promises that he will stop the officer from informing the incident to Kukku in exchange for Subbu getting transferred to Makhipur for the role of Sex Education Officer for six months. Fearing that the wedding would be cancelled, he agrees.
2	"Welcome to Makhipur"
Subbu lies to his family that the new job is about social service. He attends the sex education training uninterestedly. Makhipur is infamous for high fertility rate, lack of awareness about family planning, STDs, etc. Makhipur has very poor network connectivity thereby making it difficult for Subbu to contact Divya. Kantha Rao is Subbu's assistant who helps him understand Makhipur. The village president wants the sex education program to be conducted successfully as it is a pre-requisite for constructing a water tank in their village. Ramesh Babu, brother of the village president, wants to become president and has enmity towards his brother. On his first day, he teaches about consent to some women of the village. That night, wives do not consent to sex and the husbands become violent towards Subbu after knowing that he taught them about consent.
3	"Virginee!"
After being informed by Ramesh Babu about zero attendance in the sex-ed class, MPDO visits the village. The village president ensures maximum participation. While teaching the villagers about family planning, Subbu is mocked for being a virgin. He also messed up the condom on banana demonstration which angered the MPDO who considered firing him. After being requested by the principal, the MPDO allows Subbu to remain in the post. On a phone call with Divya, she questioned whether Subbu was a virgin. This angered him and he decided to contact the phone number which sells adult content in the village. He collects the pen drive from a location as per the instructions given on the call. While leaving the location, he found the person selling this was Swathi, a villager who aspires to become a movie heroine, whom he befriends. When he was about to view the adult content, his childhood memories haunted him and suddenly there is a power cut.
4	"The Man, The Mission"
While trying to fix the power cut, he falls in the house of Rajini, the village prostitute. He narrates his entire story to Rajini. As he spent a lot of time in Rajini's home, people misunderstood that Subbu was good in bed. With the help of Swathi, Subbu and Kantha Rao meet the women of the village in Ramesh Babu's house and explain them sex chromosomes, sanitary pads, etc. Divya meanwhile is attending an interview for a US job. Swathi attends an audition and gives an impressive performance. Some of the villagers ask Subbu to train them to perform longer in bed like he did. He makes them do random exercises, drinks with them and befriends them. After reaching home, a girl from the village meets Subbu asking for help. She closes the door and when he wakes up the next day, he does not recall what happened after the girl came. He meets the girl and asks her about what happened last night. She starts crying and in a flashback scene, it is indicated that Subbu apparently slept with her.
5	"Family Planning"
A month later, due to the poor outcomes of the sex-ed program, higher authorities assign Subbu a new task to complete, failing which his tenure would be extended. Subbu manages to organise a condom awareness program in the village despite hindrance created by Ramesh Babu and that day Subbu's family turn up as a surprise for Subbu's birthday. The village president, Kantha Rao and Swathi help Subbu keep his job a secret. Swathi gifts Subbu a handmade hourglass for his birthday. Before Subbu's family leave the village, Subbu's mother informs him about Divya's plans to go to the US. Subbu's friends from the village enquire him about lasting long on bed as the exercises are not helping. In a flashback scene, it is revealed that the task given to Subbu is to make four men undergo vasectomy. Subbu makes the four friends undergo vasectomy, without informing them about sterilisation, claiming that it will help them last long on bed. The girl Subbu apparently slept with informs him that she is pregnant and that her family will kill her if they get to know.
6	"The Mystery Girl"
Subbu and the girl go to hospital and terminate the pregnancy. Subbu organises couple counselling in the village and people like it. Subbu's teaching efforts finally start to pay off. Co-director calls Swathi's home to inform that she got the role but Benjamin asks him to cast someone else. Swathi confronts Benjamin and he insults her. Divya informs Subbu her plans to go to the US and effectively cancelled the wedding. He gets drunk with his friends, has fun and reaches home. Swathi is at his home. Swathi and Subbu share their problems. Subbu sleeps with Swathi. She expects a romantic interest from him, but he thanks her for the sex and offers her money. She slaps him and leaves. Ramesh Babu publicises Subbu's impregnation and abortion secret. He demands Subbu to reveal the girl's name. In a flashback scene, it is revealed that the girl informed Subbu that she slept with her relative, became pregnant and needed Subbu's help for the abortion. Ramesh Babu starts attacking Subbu as he refuses to reveal the name. The village president stops the fight and asks him to wait till the water tank puja completes this week.
7	"Subbu vs Kukku"
Swathi agrees to the marriage proposal arranged by Benjamin. Subbu gets to know that the abortion girl is Ramesh Babu's daughter. After the water tank puja, Ramesh Babu and his men chase Subbu. Swathi comes to his rescue and helps him board a bus. He apologises to her but she is still mad at him and the bus leaves. Divya and her family visit Kukku's home to set up the alliance again. Divya informs Subbu that her US visa got rejected. Subbu is no longer interested in the relationship but Kukku agrees to the marriage. Subbu and Divya's family accidentally get to know about Subbu's secret job. Swathi and Kantha Rao arrive at Hyderabad. Swathi informs Subbu that she ran away from her wedding and expressed her feelings towards him. Subbu embraces Swathi. Ramesh Babu calls Subbu, but Kukku picks the call and is informed that Subbu impregnated his daughter and helped with the abortion. Kukku loses his cool. Subbu confronts Kukku and tells him that he is proud to be a sex education officer. Kukku diswons Subbu. Subbu and Kantha Rao return to Makhipur by bus. The villagers surround the bus waiting to kill Subbu.

== Release ==
Netflix announced the series in October 2025. The series was premiered on Netflix from 2 July 2026.

== Critical reception ==
Divya Shree for The Times of India felt the series "loses momentum by juggling multiple subplots". Sreeju Sudhakaran for Rediff.com wrote that the series "touches upon how sex education is viewed by politicians as just another government target to be ticked off, and the pressure placed on junior officers to achieve those numbers, forcing Subbu into taking some drastic measures."

Sangeetha Devi Dando for The Hindu stated that the "finale deliberately leaves a few threads unresolved." Yashaswini Sri for The Indian Express wrote "The show earns its warmth by suggesting that laughter is not necessarily the enemy."

Nandini Ramnath of Scroll.in stated "This theme deserves better elaboration if there will be a follow-up season." Janani K for India Today wrote "By the time the finale arrives, it becomes evident that the creators are preserving several threads for another season."

ABP News reviewer Amit Bhatia rated the series 3.5 stars out of 5. A reviewer from Filmfare stated the series "may not reinvent the rural comedy genre, and its over-the-top treatment will not appeal to everyone." Reviewing for India TV Twinkle Gupta rated the series 3.5/5 stars.
