= Calling Sahasra =

2023 Telugu film

- Theatrical release poster
- Directed by: Arun Vikkirala
- Written by: Arun Vikkirala
- Produced by: Venkateswarlu Katuri; Vijesh Kumar Tayal; Chiranjeevi Pamidi
- Starring: Sudigali Sudheer; Spandana Palli; Siva Balaji; Dollysha; Ravi Prakash
- Cinematography: Sunny Domala
- Edited by: Garry BH
- Music by: Mohith Rahmaniac
- Production companies: Shadow Media Productions; Radha Arts
- Release date: 1 December 2023
- Running time: 143 minutes
- Country: India
- Language: Telugu

Calling Sahasra is a 2023 Indian Telugu language suspense thriller film directed by Arun Vikkirala and produced by Venkateshwarlu Katuri. The film features Sudigali Sudheer, Spandana Palli, Siva Balaji, Dollysha, and Ravi Prakash. The film was theatrically released in India on 1 December 2023.

== Plot ==
Ajay Srivastav is a cybersecurity expert who starts a new job. Motivated by a tragic incident from his past involving an injustice against a girl, Ajay is driven to seek justice for women in distress. Using the RESQ (Rescue) app, he intervenes to protect women facing dire situations. After acquiring a new SIM card, Ajay receives calls with a disguised identity, reaching thousands.

As the story unfolds, Ajay becomes entangled in a murder case, revealing emotional turmoil at his home and uncovering mysteries related to the RESQ app. The narrative explores the connection between Ajay and a mysterious caller named Sahasra. The film gradually unveils the reasons behind Sahasra's calls and the intricate ties between Ajay and her.

In the midst of unfolding events, Ajay's life becomes intertwined with Swathi and Sara. The film explores various facets of Ajay's journey as he navigates through the complexities of his past, the RESQ app, and the murder case, ultimately leading to the resolution of the mysteries surrounding Sahasra and the broader narrative.

== Cast ==
- Sudigali Sudheer as Ajay Srivatsav
- Spandana Palli as Sara
- Dollysha as Swathi
- Siva Balaji as Ravi
- Ravi Prakash as Rajesh
- Ravi Teja Nannimala as Sarath babu
- Rekha Koneti as Sara's Mother

== Soundtrack ==
The music and background score is composed by Mohith Rahmaniac. Aditya Music secured the rights for the audio..

No.	Title	Lyrics	Singer(s)	Length
1.	"Kalaya Nijama"	Lakshmi Priyanka	K. S. Chithra	3:40
2.	"Kanula Neeru"	Suddala Ashok Teja	Yazin Nizar	3:39
3.	"Merupe nee meenai"	Suddala Ashok Teja	Hariharan, Harika Narayan	3:29
Total length:				10:08

== Release ==
=== Theatrical ===
Calling Sahasra was released theatrically on 1 December 2023.

=== Home media ===
The digital streaming of the film was sold to Amazon Prime. The film was made available from 1 January 2024 in Telugu.

== Reception ==
Lakshminarayana Varanasi from TV9 Telugu stated that "Calling Sahasra falls short as a mediocre mystery thriller." and a critic from Eenadu wrote that "The director's incorporation of a crime element in the storyline proved unconvincing, as it failed to engage the audience. The initial half of the film was notably underwhelming."

Avad Mohammad of ottplay.com gave the film 2/5 stars and wrote that "Calling Sahasra falls short as a lackluster thriller with little to offer. Apart from sporadic moments of excitement, the film is excessively dramatic, lengthy, lacks innovation, and may not be worth considering this week."

Paul Nicodemus of The Times of India gave the film 2/5 stars and wrote "Calling Sahasra demonstrates Sudheer's adaptability but falls short in providing a unified and captivating cinematic journey, leaving the audience desiring more depth from its initially promising storyline."

Bhargav Chaganti from NTV Telugu gave the film 2.5/5 stars and wrote "Calling Sahara is a film that merits a single viewing. The story could have been improved with greater attention to detail, resulting in a more captivating experience for the audience."
