= Naa Nuvve =

2018 film by Jayendra Panchapakesan

- Theatrical release poster
- Directed by: Jayendra Panchapakesan
- Written by: Subha; Jayendra Panchapakesan; Suryaa
- Produced by: Kiran Muppavarpu; Vijaykumar Vattikuti
- Starring: Nandamuri Kalyan Ram; Tamannaah Bhatia; Vennela Kishore
- Cinematography: P. C. Sreeram
- Music by: Sharreth
- Production company: Cool Breeze Cinemas
- Release date: 14 June 2018
- Running time: 125 minutes
- Country: India
- Language: Telugu

Naa Nuvve (transl. You're mine) is a 2018 Indian Telugu-language romantic drama film written and directed by Jayendra Panchapakesan. It features Nandamuri Kalyan Ram and Tamannaah Bhatia in the lead roles. P. C. Sreeram was the cinematographer and Sharreth composed the film's music. The film was released worldwide on 14 June 2018.

== Plot ==
True love is said to be fulfilling. Meera, a happy-go-lucky radio jockey, ends up falling in love with a very confident Varun who is nothing like her in life. How far will Varun and Meera go to fight for love that completes them?

== Cast ==
- Nandamuri Kalyan Ram as Varun
- Tamannaah Bhatia as Meera
- Tanikella Bharani as Meera's father
- Posani Krishna Murali
- Vennela Kishore
- Surekha Vani
- Chevella Ravi
- Kalyani
- Praveen as Ravi
- Shekar Basha as FM Radio Jockey
- L. B. Sriram

== Music ==
The music was composed by Sharreth and released by Sony Music India.

Naa... Nuvve

Soundtrack album by Sharreth
- Released: May 7, 2018
- Recorded: 2018
- Genre: Soundtrack
- Length: 20:36
- Label: Sony Music India
- Producer: Sharreth

Sharreth chronology
Hadiyya (2017)	Naa... Nuvve (2018)	Parole (2018)

Track list
No.	Title	Lyrics	Artist(s)	Length
1.	"Hey Hey ILU" (Male Version)	Anantha Sriram	Tippu	2:27
2.	"Nijama Manasa"	Anantha Sriram	Yazin Nizar, M. M. Manasi	3:27
3.	"Right Right Right"	Ramajogayya Sastry	Tippu	2:34
4.	"Chiniki Chiniki"	Anantha Sriram	Saptaparna Chakraborty, Karthik	3:06
5.	"Premika"	Anantha Sriram	Sharreth	2:53
6.	"Naa Nuvve"	Ramajogayya Sastry	Priya Mali	3:42
7.	"Hey Hey ILU" (Female Version)	Anantha Sriram	Rita	2:27
Total length:				20:36

== Release ==
The film was released worldwide on 14 June 2018. The film's Hindi dubbed version titled Diljala Aashiq was released on YouTube by Goldmines Telefilms.

=== Critical reception ===
On the review aggregator website Rotten Tomatoes, 0% of 5 critics' reviews are positive, with an average rating of 2.5/10.

The Times of India rated the film 2/5 and called it "A dull and lifeless take on love and destiny!". 123 Telugu rated the film 2.75/5 and called it "a routine romantic drama which gets distracted by some wayward execution". Greatandhra rated the film 2/5 and says "Looks like it was written on one-line idea, and director and his writers have woven silly scenes to this single point idea."
