= Sudigali Sudheer =

Indian actor, television presenter

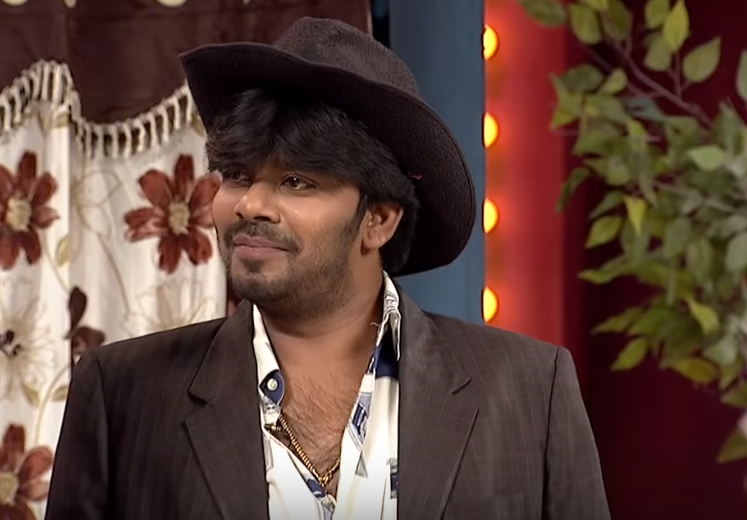
- Sudheer performing during a skit in Extra Jabardasth in 2018
- Born: Sudheer Anand Bayana; 19 May 1987 (age 39); Vijayawada, Andhra Pradesh, India
- Occupations: Actor; comedian; television presenter
- Years active: 2010–present

Sudheer Anand Bayana, professionally known as Sudigali Sudheer, is an Indian actor, comedian, and television presenter who works in Telugu films and television. He has appeared in TV shows Jabardasth, Extra Jabardasth, Pove Pora and Dhee Ultimate Dance Show. He has secured 13th place in Hyderabad Times Most Desirable Men on TV – for the year 2018.

== Early life and family ==
Sudheer Anand Bayana was born in Vijayawada, Krishna district, Andhra Pradesh to Dev Anand Bayana and Nagarani Bayana into a Telugu-speaking family. He studied in Sri Telaprolu Bappanaiah School.

== Career ==
Sudheer started his career by doing magic shows in Ramoji Film City. One of his magic shows includes Street Magic Sweet Magic. In 2013, he made his television debut as a member of Jabardasth and Extra Jabardasth. Later, he became one of the team leaders on the show. He entered as a team leader in Dhee Show season 9 and continued for five consecutive seasons. In 2016, he acted in some character roles in notable films, like Sardaar Gabbar Singh and Banthi Poola Janaki. In 2018, he hosted four episodes of the show Jackpot 2. The following year, he made his debut in the lead role in the movie Software Sudheer. The film opened to mixed reviews. In his review for The Times of India, Thadhagath Pathi wrote "If you think the first half has topped in absurdity, the second half proves you wrong and goes even further". In 2020, he starred in the movie 3 Monkeys, directed by Anil Kumar G, was released to mixed reviews In his review for The Times of India, Thadhagath Pathi wrote, "director Anil Kumar G tries to bring in some sentimental drama into a tale filled with filth and fails miserably". In 2022, his movie Gaalodu was a commercial success despite mixed reviews. In a review by The Hans India wrote, "Gaalodu is a silly action drama with nothing new to offer" In the same year he made his OTT debut by hosting the Comedy TV show "Comedy Stock Exchange" in aha. Calling Sahasra, directed by Arun Vikkirala, was Released on 31 December 2023 and got Mixed Reviews.

His upcoming project G.O.A.T directed by Naresh Kuppili.

== Filmography ==
=== Film ===
†	Denotes films that have not yet been released

Year	Title	Role	Notes	Ref
2013	Adda	Karthik		
2014	Arya Chitra	Hari		
2014	Race Gurram	Spandana's car driver		
2014	Chakkiligintha	Pub Waiter	Uncredited role	
2014	Brother of Bommali	Ramakrishna's friend		
2015	Tiger	Tiger's friend		
2015	Supreme	Movie Director		
2015	Where Is Vidya Balan	Vasu's gangmate		
2015	Sher	Pradeep		
2015	Cinema Choopistha Mava	College Student		
2016	Nenu Sailaja	Hari's friend		
2016	Drusya Kavyam	College Student		
2016	Sardaar Gabbar Singh	Police Constable		
2016	Banthi Poola Janaki	Akash		
2016	Selfie Raja	Police Constable		
2017	Middle Class Abbayi	Nani's friend		
2017	Om Namo Venkatesaya			
2017	Chitrangada	Kanakambaram		
2017	Nenorakam	Sudheer		
2017	Teeyani Kalavo	College Student		
2018	Enduko Emo	Sudheer		
2019	Software Sudheer	Chandu		
2020	3 Monkeys	Santhosh		
2021	Most Eligible Bachelor	Harsha's Friend		
2022	Wanted PanduGod	Sudheer		
2022	Gaalodu	Rajinikanth		
2023	Calling Sahasra	Ajay Srivasthav		
2026	Hailesso †	TBA	Filming	
2026	G.O.A.T †	TBA	Completed	

=== Television ===
Year	Title	Channel	Role	Notes	Ref
2010–2011	Street Magic Sweet Magic	Local TV	Magician/Host		
2013–2022	Jabardasth	ETV Telugu	Team leader		
2013–2022	Extra Jabardasth	ETV Telugu	Team leader		
2016–2017	Dhee Jodi – Season 09	ETV Telugu	Team leader	Winner	
2017–2018	Dhee – Season 10	ETV Telugu	Team leader	Winner	
2018–2019	Dhee Jodi – Season 11	ETV Telugu	Team leader	Runner-up	
2018	Jackpot – 2	Gemini TV Telugu	Host	4 episodes	
2019	Pove Pora	ETV Plus Telugu	Host		
2019	Drama Juniors Blockbuster Special	Zee Telugu	Host	3 Episodes	
2020–2021	Dhee 13 Kings v/s Queens	ETV Telugu	Team leader	Runner-up	
2021–2022	Sri Devi Drama Company	ETV Telugu	Host		
2022	Super Singer Juniors	Star Maa	Host		
2022	Thank You Dilse	Zee Telugu	Host		
2022	Party Cheddam Pushpa	Star Maa	Host		
2023	ETV Balagam (ETV 28 Years)	ETV Telugu	Host		
2024	Alluda Majaka	ETV Telugu	Host		
2024	Eesari Pandaga Manade	ETV Telugu	Host	Drama juniors season 8 year:2025	Sare ga ma pa little champs year: 2025

=== Web series ===
Year	Titile	Role	Platform	Notes	Ref
2022–2023	Comedy Stock Exchange	Host	Aha	10 Episodes	
2024	Sarkaar	Host	Aha	Season 4 - 6	
