= Memu Copulam =

Indian Telugu-language comedy-mystery streaming television series

- మేము కాపులం
- Genre: Comedy; Mystery; Satire
- Written by: Shoban Chittuprolu
- Directed by: Pradeep Maddali
- Starring: Nagendra Babu; Getup Srinu; Ravi Teja Nannimala
- Country of origin: India
- Original language: Telugu
- No. of seasons: 1

Production
- Producers: B. V. S. Ravi; Kaumudi K. Nemani
- Production company: RAW Entertainments

Original release
- Network: ZEE5
- Release: May 22, 2026

Memu Copulam (transl. We are Cops) is an Indian Telugu-language comedy-mystery streaming television series scheduled to premiere on 22 May 2026. The series is directed by Pradeep Maddali, written by Shoban Chittuprolu, and produced by B. V. S. Ravi and Kaumudi K. Nemani under the RAW Entertainments production banner. The series features Nagendra Babu, Getup Srinu, and Ravi Teja Nannimala in the principal roles.

== Synopsis ==
Set against a rural backdrop in the Godavari districts during the Sankranti festival, the narrative focuses on Mahadevapatnam, a village noted for its competitive cockfighting culture. Gajapathi Raju (Nagendra Babu), a prominent local chief, owns a highly prized fighting rooster named "Salaar Raju". Shortly before a major tournament, the rooster disappears under mysterious circumstances.

The investigation is assigned to Ravi Sotari (Ravi Teja Nannimala) and Mohan Sotari (Getup Srinu), two inexperienced and bumbling police constables. While pursuing eccentric clues and mismanaging the investigation, the officers inadvertently uncover a broader underlying conspiracy that impacts the village community.

== Cast ==
- Nagendra Babu as Gajapathi Raju, a village leader
- Getup Srinu as Mohan Sotari, a police constable
- Ravi Teja Nannimala as Ravi Sotari, a police constable
- Charan Lakkaraju as Akash Reddy
- Reethu Chowdary as Meenakshi
- Kireeti Damaraju as Giri
- Siri Parvathy as Sanghavi

== Production and marketing ==
=== Development ===
Following the release of the series Vikkatakavi, director Pradeep Maddali collaborated with production banner RAW Entertainments for an investigative comedy series titled Memu Copulam. The script was developed by Shoban Chittuprolu, focusing on regional rural satire and situational comedy.

=== Title controversy and marketing ===
In early May 2026, the producers initiated a marketing campaign involving a staged conflict. A video clip emerged online showing actor Getup Srinu and television journalist Jaffar engaged in a heated argument during a mock interview. In the footage, Jaffar criticized the project's title, misinterpreting it as "Memu Kapulam" (transl. We are Kapus), and questioned the integration of caste-based identities in regional cinema. Getup Srinu simulated walking out of the interview, which led to widespread discussion and polarization among social media users.

The production team subsequently clarified that the altercation was a planned promotional stunt. They revealed that the actual title was stylized as Memu COP'ulam, a pun substituting the Telugu word Kapulam (guardians/caste reference) with the English word Cop (police officers) to reflect the protagonists' occupations. The official trailer for the series was launched on 14 May 2026 by Telugu actor Brahmanandam.

== Release ==
Memu Copulam is scheduled to stream on the digital platform ZEE5 beginning 22 May 2026.
