= Bheems Ceciroleo =

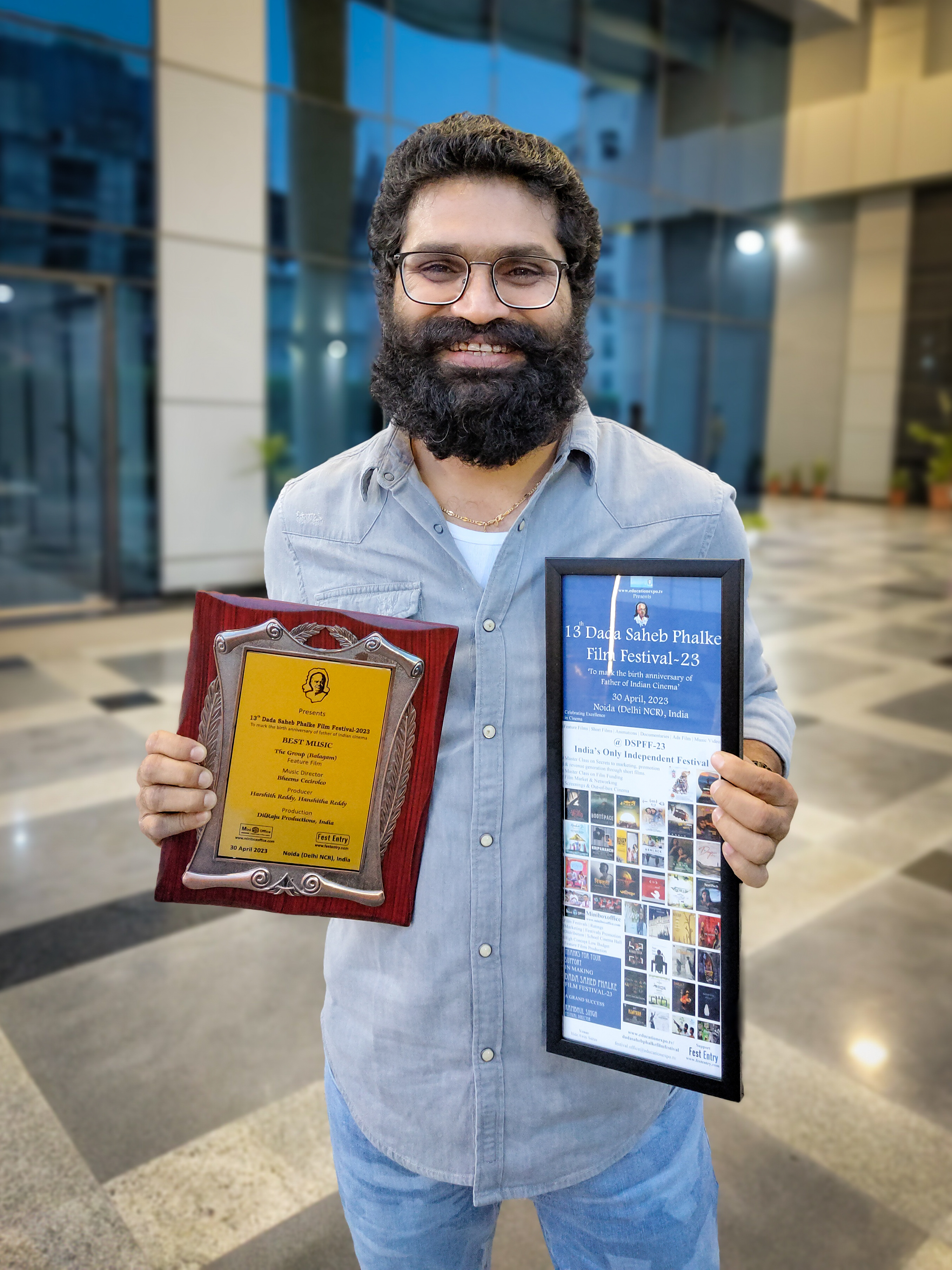
- Bheems Ceciroleo with Dada Saheb Phalke Film Festival Award for 'Best Music' for Balagam.

Background information
- Born: Bayyaram, Mahabubabad District, Telangana, India
- Occupations: Composer, singer, lyricist and director
- Years active: 2012–present
- Labels: T-Series; Aditya Music; Times Music

Bheems Ceciroleo is an Indian composer, record producer, singer, songwriter, multi-instrumentalist, and lyricist best known for his works in Telugu cinema.

== Personal life ==
His last name comes from his father, who named him after Cicero and Galileo (hence Ceciro-leo).

== Discography ==
Key
†	Denotes films that have not yet been released

=== As composer ===
Year	Title	Notes
2012	Nuvva Nena	
2013	Kevvu Keka	
2014	Galipatam	
2014	Joru	
2014	Ala Ela	
2015	Mana Kurraalle	
2015	Bengal Tiger	
2017	Angel	
2017	Nakshatram	
2017	PSV Garuda Vega	
2018	Syam Naidu	
2019	4 Letters	
2019	Software Sudheer	
2021	FCUK: Father Chitti Umaa Kaarthik	Also sang "Manasu Katha"
2021	Chalo Premiddam	
2021	Ram Asur	
2022	Suraapanam	
2022	Katha Kanchiki Manam Intiki	
2022	Gaalodu	
2022	Dhamaka	Nominated–SIIMA Award for Best Music Director – Telugu
2023	Prathyardhi	Only composed "Edo Nasha Nasha" song
2023	Balagam	
2023	Ravanasura	Only composed "Dikka Dishum" song
2023	Agent	Only composed "Wild Saala" song
2023	Unstoppable	
2023	Slum Dog Husband	
2023	Mad	
2024	Bootcut Balaraju	
2024	Razakar	
2024	Vey Dharuvey	
2024	Tillu Square	Background score only
2024	Viswam	Only composed "Gunguru Gunguru" song
2024	Devaki Nandana Vasudeva	
2025	Sankranthiki Vasthunam	Also co-sung 3 songs in the film's soundtrack
2025	Mad Square	
2025	Mass Jathara	
2025	Krishna Leela	
2025	12A Railway Colony	
2026	Mana Shankara Vara Prasad Garu	
2026	Bhartha Mahasayulaku Wignyapthi	
2026	Funky	
2026	Dacoit: A Love Story	
2026	Reality	

=== As lyricist ===
Year	Film	Songs
2003	Aayudham	"Oye Raju"
2011	Seema Tapakai	"Dheere Dheere Dille"
2013	Kevvu Keka	"Babu Rambabu Kannullo Nuvve"
2014	Joru	
2014	Aagadu	"Junction Lo" With Bhaskarabhatla Ravi Kumar
2022	Dhamaka	"Dandakadiyal"
