= Dance Ikon =

Indian television series

- Genre: reality-dance
- Presented by: Ohmkar
- Judges: Ramya Krishnan; Sekhar Master; Faria Abdullah
- Country of origin: India
- Original language: Telugu
- No. of seasons: 2

Production
- Producer: Sreemukhi
- Camera setup: Multi-camera

Original release
- Network: aha
- Release: 2022 – 2025

Dance Ikon is an Indian Telugu-language dance reality show hosted by Ohmkar streaming on aha.

== Seasons ==
Season no.	Season	Host	Winning Master (Choreographer)	Winning Contestant	Judges	Mentors	Guests	Ref.
1	Dance Ikon season 1	Ohmkar	Raju	Asif	Ramya Krishnan, Sekhar Master	Sreemukhi (mentor), Yash Master (mentor), Monal Gajjar (mentor)	Vijay Devarakonda (guest), Ananya Panday (guest)	
2	Dance Ikon season 2 Wildfire	Ohmkar	—N/a	Binita Chetry	Sekhar Master, Faria Abdullah	Priyanka Jain (wildcard)	Kiran Abbavaram (guest)	
