= Getup Srinu =

Indian actor and comedian (born 1984)

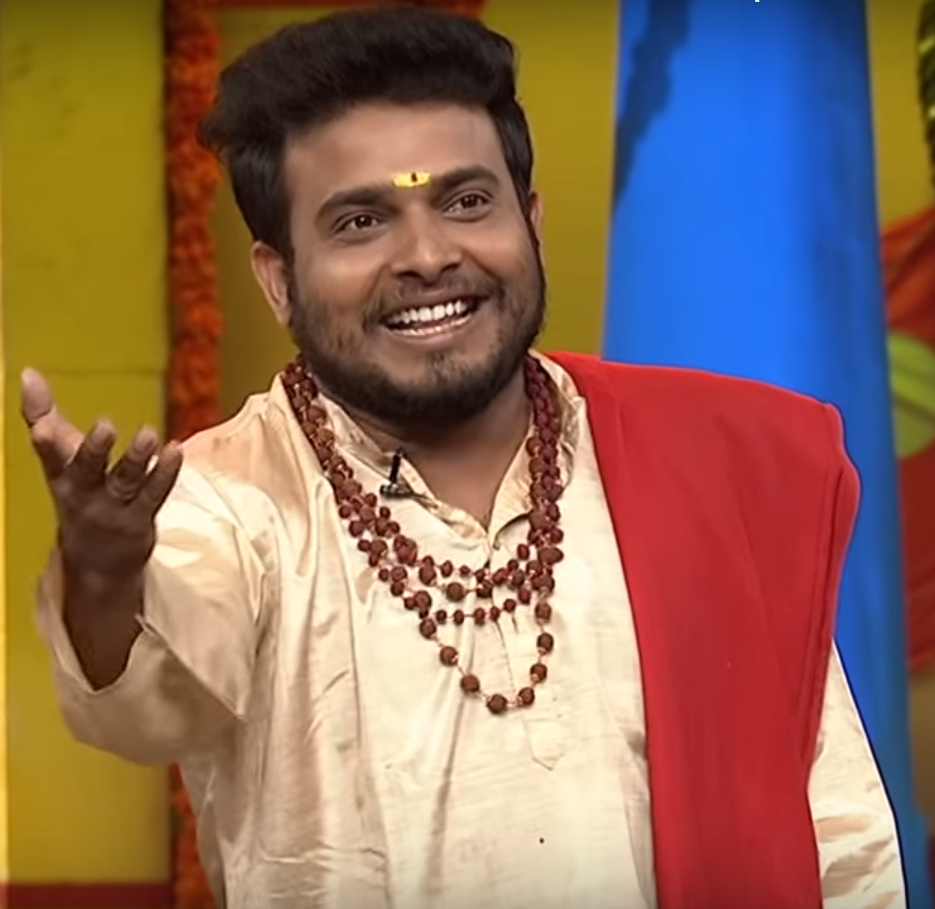
- Born: Srinu Boddupalli; 12 December 1984 (age 41); Akividu, Andhra Pradesh, India
- Occupation: Actor
- Years active: 2013-present
- Spouse: Sujatha

Boddupalli Srinu, popularly known by his stage name Getup Srinu, is an Indian actor and stand-up comedian who primarily works in Telugu cinema and television. He earned the name "Getup Srinu" for his various getups in the TV sketch-comedy shows Jabardasth and Extra Jabardasth.

== Career ==
Srinu acted in Khaidi No. 150, Rangasthalam, Maharshi, iSmart Shankar, and Zombie Reddy, after making his debut in Tollywood with Telugabbai. Additionally, he has hosted the show Cinema Chupista Mama on ETV Plus.

== Filmography ==
Year	Title	Role	Notes
2013	Telugabbai		
2014	Chakkiligintha	College student	credited as Jabardasth Srinu
2015	Tungabhadra	Sreenu's friend	
2015	Dagudumootha Dandakor	Bhatraju	
2015	Where Is Vidya Balan	Kiran's gangmate	
2015	Vinavayya Ramayya		
2015	Sher		
2016	Saptagiri Express		
2017	Khaidi No. 150		
2017	Nenorakam	Goon	
2017	Anaganaga Oka Durga		
2017	Next Nuvve		
2017	Idi Maa Prema Katha		
2018	Touch Chesi Chudu	Wasim	
2018	Raa Raa		
2018	Rangasthalam		
2018	Shailaja Reddy Alludu		
2019	Maharshi	Villager in Ramavaram	
2019	Viswamitra		
2019	Vajra Kavachadhara Govinda		
2019	iSmart Shankar	Shankar's friend	
2019	Nani's Gang Leader	Manikyam	
2019	Rayalaseema Love Story	Mangalam	
2019	Raju Gari Gadhi 3		
2019	Bhagyanagara Veedullo Gamattu	Assistant Beggar	
2020	Dubsmash	Director Seenu	
2020	3 Monkeys	Phani	Lead role
2020	V		
2021	Alludu Adhurs		
2021	Zombie Reddy	Kasi Reddy	
2021	Aakashavaani	Srinu	
2021	Ja		
2021	Bangaru Bullodu		
2021	Most Eligible Bachelor	Sastry Jr.	
2021	Cauliflower	Andy Flower's caretaker	
2021	Maa Oori Polimera	Balija	
2022	Kothala Rayudu		
2022	Katha Kanchiki Manam Intiki		
2022	Acharya		
2022	F3: Fun and Frustration	Bull Chittibabu's breeder	
2022	Happy Birthday	William	
2022	Liger	Ganapath	Simultaneously shot in Hindi
2022	Nenu Meeku Baaga Kavalsinavaadini		
2022	Thaggedele		
2023	Waltair Veerayya		
2023	Ramabanam	Vijju	
2023	Bhola Shankar	House Owner's brother-in-law	
2023	Jilebi		
2023	Bedurulanka 2012	News anchor	
2023	Maa Oori Polimera 2	Balija	
2024	Hanu-Man	Kaasi	
2024	Saindhav	Ramesh	
2024	Raju Yadav	Raju Yadav	Lead role
2024	Double iSmart	Shankar's friend	
2024	Devara: Part 1	Mettha Srinu	
2024	Swag	Michael	
2025	Akkada Ammayi Ikkada Abbayi	Paani	
2025	Mirai	Memesh	
2025	12A Railway Colony	Karthik's friend	
2026	Bhartha Mahasayulaku Wignyapthi	Manju	
2026	Nari Nari Naduma Murari	Srinu	
2026	S Saraswathi		
2026	Raakaasa	Balu	
2026	Jetlee	Simpson Seenu	
2026	Lenin	Murali	

=== Television ===
Year	Work	Role	Network
2013–2014	Jabardasth	Various	ETV
2014–present	Extra Jabardasth	Various	ETV
2020–2021	Amrutham Dhvitheeyam		ZEE5
2021	Oka Chinna Family Story	Agent Balu	ZEE5
2022	Aha Naa Pellanta	Neighbour Seenu	ZEE5
2023	Maya Bazaar For Sale	Police Inspector	ZEE5
2026	Memu Copulam	Mohan Sotari	ZEE5
2026	Super Subbu	Kantha Rao	Netflix
