= Kevvu Keka =

- Movie Poster
- Directed by: Devi Prasad
- Screenplay by: Devi Prasad
- Story by: Devi Prasad; Satish Vegesna
- Produced by: Boppana Chandrasekhar
- Starring: Allari Naresh; Sharmiela Mandre; Ali; M. S. Narayana; Ashish Vidyarthi; Krishna Bhagavaan
- Cinematography: Adusumilli Vijay Kumar
- Edited by: Hari Nandamuri
- Music by: Bheems Ceciroleo; Chinni Charan
- Production company: Jahnavi Productions
- Release date: 19 July 2013
- Running time: 150 minutes
- Country: India
- Language: Telugu

Kevvu Keka (transl. You are awesome) is a 2013 Telugu-language comedy film written and directed by Devi Prasad, produced by Boppana Chandrasekhar under Jahnavi Productions banner and starring Allari Naresh and Sharmiela Mandre in the lead roles. Cinematography is handled by Adusumilli Vijay Kumar and editing will be done by Hari Nandamuri. Soundtrack for the film will be composed by Bheems Ceciroleo and Chinni Charan. The film was released on 19 July 2013. In 2017, it was dubbed into Hindi as Daring Chalbaaz by WAM India Movies.

== Plot ==
Buchi Raju is a salesman in Kalanikethan Mall who lives with his uncle Abrakadabra Appa Rao, who is a magician. Buchi Raju happens to come across Maha Lakshmi one fine day and falls in love with her. Maha Lakshmi also responds to Buchi Rahju, and they fall in love. Maha Lakshmi's father, Subba Rao does not approve of this alliance because Buchi Raju is not rich. To win Maha Lakshmi's hand, Buchi Raju promises to earn much money within six months and leaves. Through Appa Rao, he learns of a Bangkok businessman named Gottam Gopalakrishna and a fortune that is waiting for him. Armed with this information, Buchi Raju decides to go to Bangkok to seek his money.

== Cast ==
- Allari Naresh as Bhucchi Raju
- Sharmiela Mandre as Maha Lakshmi
- Ali as Appal Raju
- M. S. Narayana as Subba Rao
- Ashish Vidyarthi as Gottam Gopalakrishna
- Krishna Bhagavaan as Abrakadabra Appa Rao
- Prudhviraj as Punctuality Prabhanjanam
- Kiran Rathod as Mrs. Gottam Gopalakrishna / Jaanu
- Kavitha as Jagadamba
- Khayyum
- Chalapathi Rao
- Geetha Singh
- Chalaki Chanti
- Jeeva
- Dhanraj
- Jyoti Labala as Alaknanda
- Shanoor Sana
- Tharika
- Apoorva
- Narsingh Yadav
- Mumaith Khan (cameo)

== Production ==
=== Development ===
Allari Naresh and Devi Prasad previously worked together in 2008 successful film Blade Babji. Initial news of the film and the title was reported on 22 July 2012. On the same day, Naresh through his Twitter account, confirmed that his next project would be with Devi Prasad and that the film was titled Kevvu Keka. It was also reported that the film would be officially launched on 25 July 2012. On 25 July, the launch event was organized at Ramanaidu Studios in Hyderabad and was attended by Akkineni Nageswara Rao as chief guest. The muhurat shot was filmed, and a press meet was held revealing the additional details about the project. It was announced that the popular writer Satish Vegesna, who previously collaborated with Naresh for several films would handle the dialogues and script of the film. It was announced that both Devi Prasad and Satish Vegesna has worked for over three years on the film script and Gutti Madhu would act as script coordinator for the film. It was also announced that cinematography would be handled by Vijay Kumar and the music would be composed collaboratively by two music composers: Bheems and Chinni Charan. During the press meet, it was revealed that the film would be released in 2013 and would star a new heroine opposite Naresh. The film title was inspired by a song from the 2012 film Gabbar Singh. On 3 October, reports emerged that Kannada actress Sharmiela Mandre was cast as the heroine in the film; this was later confirmed by her in an interview. This would be her debut film in Tollywood.

=== Filming ===
The regular filming began on 3 October 2012 in Hyderabad. It was also announced that the major part of filming would be done in Hyderabad and Bangkok. A press note was released by the producers announcing the entire film schedule. It was announced that the first schedule of filming would take place from 1 November 2012 to 15 November 2012 in the surroundings of Hyderabad. The second schedule would take place from 5 December 2012 to 20 December 2012. The last and final schedule would take place in Bangkok from 15 January 2013 to 12 February 2013 with which the filming would be wrapped. At Last Allari Naresh Kevvu Keka Movie Shooting Completed

== Soundtrack ==
Kevvu Keka

Soundtrack album by Bheems Ceciroleo and Chinni Charan
- Released: 30 June 2013
- Recorded: 2013
- Genre: Film soundtrack
- Length: 14:47
- Label: Aditya Music

Bheems Ceciroleo chronology
Nuvva Nena (2012)	Kevvu Keka (2013)	Galipatam (2013)

The soundtrack of the film was composed by Bheems Ceciroleo and Chinni Charan and released through the Aditya Music label on 30 June 2013. The album consists of four songs. Lyrics for the four songs were penned by Bheems Ceciroleo, Sri Mani, Ketharinath and Suddala Ashok Teja.

Track listing
No.	Title	Lyrics	Singer(s)	Length
1.	"Yerra Yerranidana"	Suddala Ashok Teja	Vedala Hemachandra, Geeta Madhuri	3:02
2.	"Modhal Modhal"	Sri Mani	Chinni Charan, Ramya Behara	4:02
3.	"Babu Rambabu"	Bheems Ceciroleo	Sunidhi Chauhan, Bheems, Narendra Sharan	3:42
4.	"Romeo Juliet"	Ketharinath	Ranjith Govind, Vijay Prakash, Deepthi Sayanora	4:01
Total length:				14:47
