= 3 Monkeys (2020 film) =

Indian Telugu drama film by Anil Kumar G

- Directed by: Anil Kumar G
- Written by: Anil Kumar G
- Produced by: G. Nagesh
- Starring: Sudigali Sudheer; Getup Srinu; Auto Ram Prasad; Karunya Chowdary; Kautilya
- Cinematography: Sunny Domala
- Edited by: Uday Kumar D
- Music by: Anil Kumar G
- Production company: Orugallu Cine Creations
- Release date: February 7, 2020
- Country: India
- Language: Telugu

3 Monkeys is a 2020 Indian Telugu-language comedy-drama film written and directed by Anil Kumar G, starring Sudigali Sudheer, Getup Srinu and Auto Ram Prasad. The story revolves around three friends who get into trouble after meeting Sunny Leone, played by Karunya Chowdary. The situation worsens with the appearance of Shatru, played by Kautilya.

== Plot ==
The plot revolves around three friends - Santhosh, Phani and Anand. Phani is an aspiring film director, Santhosh works in marketing while Anand is a software engineer. One day, they come across Sunny Leone, who has a rare heart disease which leaves her temporarily comatose. During one of such incident, the trio think that she should be buried as they are thinking that she is dead. They encounter police as they learn that a murder has been committed in the same locality. A corrupt police officer C.I. Sathru learns about this and blackmails them. What is the history between the police officer and the friends? What happens next forms the crux of the story.

== Cast ==
- Sudigali Sudheer as Santhosh
- Getup Srinu as Phani
- Ram Prasad as Anand
- Karunya Chowdary as Sunny Leone
- Kautilya as C.I. Sathru
- Shakalaka Shankar as Doctor Bali

== Soundtrack ==
3 Monkeys

Soundtrack album by Anil Kumar G
- Released: 4 February 2020
- Recorded: 2020
- Genre: Feature Film Soundtrack
- Label: Mango Music
- Producer: G Nagesh

No.	Title	Singer(s)	Length
1.	"3 Monkeys Title Track"	Ramya NSK
2.	"Badhule Leni"	Haricharan
3.	"Payanam Baruvai"	Madhu Balakrishna
4.	"Kadha Lo Kadhanam"	Madhu Balakrishna
5.	"Amma Cheppe Maatale"	Gopireddy Anil Kumar
6.	"RaRa dariki ra"	Lipsika

== Reception ==
The movie received mixed reviews. Times of India has given 1.5 out of 5 mentioning "An extension of idiotic comedy skits seen on television".
