= Sekhar (choreographer) =

Indian dance choreographer (born 1979)

- Born: 7 November 1980 (age 46); Vijayawada, Andhra Pradesh, India
- Occupation: Dance choreographer
- Years active: 1996–present
- Spouse: Sujatha
- Children: 2

Sekhar Vulli VJ (born 7 November 1980), also known professionally as Sekhar Master is an Indian dance choreographer who predominantly works in Telugu apart from a few Tamil films. He is a recipient of six Filmfare Awards South.

== Early life ==
Sekhar was born on 7 November 1980 in Vijayawada, Andhra Pradesh. He studied in Vijayawada until intermediate, and moved to Hyderabad in 1996. He met action coordinator Sambasiva Rao through his uncle, who liked his dance and advised him to pursue a career in films. He got his membership card as a background dancer in Telugu Film &TV Dance Directors Association in 1996. He was a student of a choreographer Rakesh Master. He worked as a background dancer for six years and as an assistant for eight years before becoming a movie choreographer.

Sekhar is married to Sujatha, and the couple has two children.

== Filmography ==
=== As choreographer ===
List of films and songs choreographed
Year	Title	Language	Notes
2007	Mantra	Telugu	
2008	Nesthama	Telugu	
2010	Baava	Telugu	
2012	Shiva Manasulo Shruti	Telugu	
2012	Julayi	Telugu	
2012	Damarukam	Telugu	
2013	Baadshah	Telugu	
2013	Gunde Jaari Gallanthayyinde	Telugu	
2013	Iddarammayilatho	Telugu	
2013	Prema Katha Chitram	Telugu	
2013	Ramayya Vasthavayya	Telugu	
2014	Yevadu	Telugu	
2014	Heart Attack	Telugu	
2014	Alludu Seenu	Telugu	
2014	Rabhasa	Telugu	
2014	Oka Laila Kosam	Telugu	
2014	Pilla Nuvvu Leni Jeevitham	Telugu	
2014	Action Jackson	Hindi	
2014	Chinnadana Nee Kosam	Telugu	
2015	Temper	Telugu	
2015	Son of Satyamurthy	Telugu	
2015	Noothilo Kappalu	Telugu	
2015	Dohchay	Telugu	
2015	Pandaga Chesko	Telugu	
2015	Bruce Lee: The Fighter	Telugu	
2015	Akhil	Telugu	
2016	Nannaku Prematho	Telugu	
2016	Sarrainodu	Telugu	
2016	Janatha Garage	Telugu	
2016	Santhu Straight Forward	Telugu	
2017	Khaidi No. 150	Telugu	
2017	Nenu Local	Telugu	
2017	Winner	Telugu	
2017	Duvvada Jagannadham	Telugu	
2017	Fidaa	Telugu	
2017	Jai Lava Kusa	Telugu	
2017	Raja the Great	Telugu	
2017	Middle Class Abbayi	Telugu	
2018	Tholi Prema	Telugu	
2018	Rangasthalam	Telugu	
2018	Chal Mohan Ranga	Telugu	
2018	Paperboy	Telugu	
2018	Sailaja Reddy Alludu	Telugu	
2018	Devadas	Telugu	
2018	Hello Guru Prema Kosame	Telugu	
2018	Savyasachi	Telugu	
2019	Vinaya Vidheya Rama	Telugu	
2019	F2: Fun and Frustration	Telugu	
2019	Mr. Majnu	Telugu	
2019	Kausalya krishnamurthy	Telugu	
2019	iSmart Shankar	Telugu	
2019	Gaddalakonda Ganesh	Telugu	
2019	Sye Raa Narasimha Reddy	Telugu	
2019	Arjun Suravaram	Telugu	
2020	Sarileru Neekevvaru	Telugu	
2020	Ala Vaikunthapurramuloo	Telugu	
2020	Orey Bujjiga	Telugu	
2020	Soorarai Pottru	Tamil	
2020	Solo Brathuke So Better	Telugu	
2021	30 Rojullo Preminchadam Ela	Telugu	
2021	Gaali Sampath	Telugu	
2021	Rang De	Telugu	
2021	Alludu Adhurs	Telugu	
2021	Maestro	Telugu	
2021	Love Story	Telugu	
2021	Acharya	Telugu	
2021	Pushpa: The Rise	Telugu	
2021	Pelli SandaD	Telugu	
2021	Varudu Kaavalenu	Telugu	
2021	Dharmapuri	Telugu	
2022	James	Kannada	
2022	Sarkaru Vaari Paata	Telugu	
2022	The Warrior	Telugu	
2022	Dhamaka	Telugu	
2023	Waltair Veerayya	Telugu	Cameo appearance in the song "Poonakalu Loading"
2023	Veera Simha Reddy	Telugu	
2023	Ravanasura	Telugu	
2023	Bhagavanth Kesari	Telugu	
2024	Guntur Kaaram	Telugu	
2024	Mr. Bachchan	Telugu	
2024	Krishnam Pranaya Sakhi	Kannada	
2024	The Greatest of All Time	Tamil	
2024	Devara: Part 1	Telugu	
2024	Viswam	Telugu	
2024	Pushpa 2: The Rule	Telugu	
2025	Daaku Maharaaj	Telugu	
2025	Thandel	Telugu	
2025	Mazaka	Telugu	
2025	Robinhood	Telugu	
2025	Kuberaa	Telugu/Tamil	
2025	Madharaasi	Tamil	
2025	Akkada Ammayi Ikkada Abbayi	Telugu	
2025	Mass Jathara	Telugu	
2025	Thamma	Hindi	
2026	Bhartha Mahasayulaku Wignyapthi	Telugu	
2026	Nari Nari Naduma Murari	Telugu	
2026	Jana Nayagan	Tamil	

=== Other ===
Year	Title	Song(s)	Role	Notes
2013	Krrish 3	"God Allah Aur Bhagwan"	Himself	Cameo appearance in the song
2023	–	"Zari Zari Panche Uttu"	Choreographer	Choreographed dance sequences in the independent song "Zari Zari Panche Uttu"
2023	–	"Sweet Palakova"	Producer	Produced the song and music video
2023	–	"Unnale Neekosam"	Producer	Produced the song and music video
2024	–	"Vihari"	Producer	Produced the song and music video
2024	–	"Sokuladi Sittammi"	Producer	Produced the song and music video
2024	–	"Middle Class Abbai"	Producer	Produced the song and music video
2024	–	"Sarah"	Producer	Produced the song and music video
2024	–	"Manasukintha Alajadi"	Producer	Produced the song and music video
2024	–	"Drug Of Dance"	Producer	Produced the song and music video

=== Television ===
List of television shows and roles
Year	Title	Role	Network	Ref.
2009	Dhee 2	Choreographer	ETV	
2012	Dhee 5	Choreographer	ETV	
2014–2023	Dhee	Judge	ETV	
2019	Jabardasth	Guest judge	ETV	
2019	Extra Jabardasth	Guest judge	ETV	
2020–2021	Comedy Stars	Judge	Star Maa	
2023–2025	Dance Ikon	Judge	Aha	
2026	BB Jodi	Judge	Star Maa	

== Awards and nominations ==
List of awards and nominations
Year	Award	Category	Work	Result	Ref.
2012	2nd South Indian International Movie Awards	Best Choreographer	Julai	Won	
2013	Nandi Awards of 2013	Best Choreographer	Gunde Jaari Gallanthayyinde	Won	
2014	61st Filmfare Awards South	Best Choreography	Iddarammayilatho ("Top Lechipoddi")	Won	
2016	63rd Filmfare Awards South	Best Choreography	Bruce Lee: The Fighter ("Kung Fu Kumaari")	Won	
2017	64th Filmfare Awards South	Best Choreography	Janatha Garage ("Apple Beauty")	Won	
2017	49th Cinegoers Awards	Best Choreography	Khaidi No. 150	Won	
2018	65th Filmfare Awards South	Best Choreography	Khaidi No. 150 ("Ammudu Lets Do Kummudu"), Fidaa ("Vachinde")	Won	
2018	16th Santosham Film Awards	Best Choreographer	Khaidi No. 150	Won	
2022	67th Filmfare Awards South	Best Choreography	Ala Vaikunthapurramuloo ("Ramuloo Ramulaa")	Won	
2026	70th Filmfare Awards South	Best Choreography	Guntur Kaaram ("Kurchi Madathapetti")	Won	
