= Hyper Aadi =

Indian actor

- Born: Kota Aadayya; 6 June 1990 (age 36); Chimakurthy, Andhra Pradesh, India
- Occupation: Actor
- Years active: 2015–present

Kota Aadayya, professionally known as Hyper Aadi, is an Indian actor and television presenter who appears in Telugu films and television. He was born in Pallamalla Village, Chimakurthy Mandal near to Ongole, Andhra Pradesh. He is known for his appearance in the television comedy show Jabardasth.

== Career ==
Aadi started his career working for an engineering job after completing his B. Tech. He later quit his job and started acting on television after being spotted in a short film. He is known for his work on the TV show Jabardasth. His skits, sarcastic jokes, and drawings earned him the name 'Hyper' Aadi and subsequently earned him the chance to perform in films starting with Meda Meeda Abbayi.

== Filmography ==
Year	Title	Role	Notes
2017	Meda Meeda Abbayi	Bandla Babji	Also dialogue writer
2018	Tholi Prema	Raju	
2018	Aatagadharaa Siva	Aadhi	
2018	Savyasachi	Padmanabham	
2019	Mr. Majnu	Pulla Rao	
2019	Chitralahari	Ajay	
2019	Bhagyanagara Veedullo Gamattu	Mahesh	
2019	Venky Mama	Seetharam	
2020	Ala Vaikunthapurramuloo	Rangaraju	
2020	Solo Brathuke So Better	Virat's friend	
2021	30 Rojullo Preminchadam Ela	Arjun's friend	
2021	Krack	Constable	
2021	Natyam	CD Shop Owner	
2022	Bheemla Nayak	Cameo Appearance	
2022	Dhamaka	Driver	
2023	Sir	Karthik	Simultaneously shot in Tamil as Vaathi
2023	Das Ka Dhamki	Aadhi	
2023	Ravanasura	Advocate Babji	
2023	Rules Ranjann	Ranjan's friend	
2023	Extra Ordinary Man	Constable Ganga	
2024	Bhale Unnade	Prathap	
2024	Shivam Bhaje	Apple Reddy	
2024	Gangs of Godavari	Murthy	
2024	Lucky Baskhar	Stock Market Broker	
2024	Mechanic Rocky	Murthy	
2024	Pushpa 2: The Rule	Kotayya	
2025	Racharikam		
2025	Mazaka		
2025	Kishkindhapuri	Vihari	
2025	Mass Jathara	Paidiraju	
2025	Champion	Chakrapani	
2025	Premante	Constable Prem	
2026	Vishwanath & Sons	Kailasam	

=== Television series ===
Year	Work	Role	Network	Notes
2015–2022	Jabardasth	Various	ETV	
2019–present	Dhee		ETV	
2020–present	Sridevi Drama Company	Various	ETV	
2026	Super Subbu	Madhusudan Rao's brother-in-law	Netflix	
2026	Least Eligible Bachelor			
