= Wanted Pandugod =

2022 Indian film

- Official poster
- Directed by: Sreedhar Seepana
- Written by: Janardhana Maharshi
- Produced by: Sai Baba Kovelamudi; Venkat Kovelamudi
- Starring: Sunil; Sudigali Sudheer; Deepika Pilli
- Cinematography: Mahi Reddy Pandugula
- Edited by: Tammiraju
- Music by: Peddapalli Rohit
- Production company: United K Productions
- Release date: 19 August 2022
- Country: India
- Language: Telugu

Wanted Pandugod (stylized as Wanted PanduGod) is a 2022 Indian Telugu-language comedy film directed by Sreedhar Seepana and features Sunil, Sudigali Sudheer, and Deepika Pilli in primary roles. The film was released on 19 August 2022.

== Cast ==
- Sunil as Pandugadu
- Sudigali Sudheer
- Deepika Pilli
- Srinivasa Reddy
- Vennela Kishore
- Vishnupriya Bhimeneni
- Saptagiri
- Nitya Shetty
- Anasuya Bharadwaj
- Tanikella Bharani
- Aamani
- Shakalaka Shankar
- Brahmanandam as a doctor
- Prudhviraj
- Raghu Babu
- Ananth Babu
- Jagadeesh Prathap Bandari
- Vasanthi Krishnan
- Hema

== Production ==
The film was presented by director K. Raghavendra Rao.

== Release and reception ==
Wanted Pandugod was released theatrically on 19 August 2022. Post-theatrical streaming rights of the film were acquired by Aha.

A critic from Sakshi praised the film's comedy. Asianet News Telugu gave the film a rating of two-and-a-half out of five stars and wrote that the film can entertain a certain audience.
