= Dhee (TV series) =

Indian television series

- Also known as: Dhee - The Ultimate Dance Show
- Genre: reality-dance
- Directed by: Kennedy; Benzene; Deepthi Reddy; Sanjeev K Kumar; Mahesh; Nagaraju; Sanjeev K Kumar; Nithin; Bharath; Govada Manikanta
- Creative director: Naga Raju Goud
- Presented by: Udaya Bhanu; Niharika Konidela; Pradeep Machiraju; Sudigali Sudheer; Nandu
- Judges: Prabhu Deva; Rambha; Sekhar; Jani; Vishwa Raghu; Renu Desai; Sadha; Anee; Priyamani; Poorna; Baba Bhaskar; Ganesh
- Country of origin: India
- Original language: Telugu
- No. of seasons: 20
- No. of episodes: 580

Production
- Executive producer: Lekkala Balaji
- Producer: Shyam Prasad Reddy
- Production locations: Hyderabad, India
- Editors: Kolluri Venkatanagendra; Uppuluri Naganjaneyulu (Nani)
- Camera setup: Multi-camera
- Running time: 53 - 65 minutes
- Production company: Mallemala Entertainments

Original release
- Network: ETV
- Release: 2009 – present

Related
- Dhee Juniors

Dhee is an Indian Telugu-language dance reality show broadcast on ETV. The show is produced by Mallemalla Productions and is referred to as one of the biggest dance show in Telugu television industry.

The first season of the show was presented by Prabhu Deva. Rambha was the judge of the show in season four. The show has recently finished its 13th season as of 8 December 2021 with the name 'Dhee Kings Vs Queens' and has started another season named 'Dhee 14 Dancing Icon' where both are hosted by Pradeep Machiraju with Sushmita, Akhil Sarthak, Vamsi and Hyper Aadi as team leaders. Ganesh Master, Priyamani and Nandita Swetha as primary judges.

== History ==
The show was started in the year 2009. It was directed by Kennedy in the first season with Prabhu Deva as presenter, next seasons saw Benzene and Deepthi Reddy, sanjeev k kumar Mahesh, Sanjay, Nagaraju as directors. Later Sanjeev K Kumar took over the Dhee season, who has directed other television shows like Cash and Jabardasth for ETV Telugu. The creative director of the show is Naga Raju Goud.

== Iterations ==
The season 7 and season 8 of the show were conceived & directed by Sanjeev k kumar and hosted by Niharika Konidela.

The season 9 of the show with the name Dhee Jodi started in 2016 and ended in June 2017. The show although right from inception was proving to be the largest in South India, the argument became undebatable from around this season as it gained a national recognition with contestants from all across the country. Directed by Nitin and Bharath, Dhee Jodi (Dhee 9) was hosted by Pradeep Machiraju with Shekhar Master and Sadha as the judges. Sudigali Sudheer and Rashmi Gautam were the promotional team.

Dhee 10 started with Shekar Master, Priyamani and Anee as judges with four teams (Sudheer, Rashmi, Varshini, Hemanth.) Later during the progress of the season 10, the four teams were combined into two teams (Sudheer and Varshini) and (Rashmi Gautam and Hemanth) teams. Dhee 10 Winner is Raju (Chitti master). Lately the show has been receiving both criticism and praise from various corners for adding more comedy and gymnastic elements in addition to being a dance reality show.

Dhee Jodi (Dhee 11) was hosted by Pradeep Machiraju and judged by Shekar Master, Priyamani, and Anee Master (later replaced by Poorna). The team leaders were Sudigali Sudheer and Rashmi Gautam. The winner of the season was Mahesh and Ritu (Prasanth Master).

Dhee Champions (Dhee 12) was judged by Sekhar Master, Priyamani and Poorna. The two teams, Sudigali Sudheer and Rashmi Gautam against Hyper Adi and Varshini. Dhee 12's winner is Piyush Gurbhele ( Yaswanth Master).

Dhee 13 Kings v/s Queens (Dhee 13) was judged by Shekhar Master, Priyamani and Poorna. The two teams are namely Kings led by Sudigali Sudheer and Hyper Aadi, and Queens led by Rashmi Gautam, and Deepika Pilli. It was once again hosted by Pradeep Machiraju.

== Show format ==
The Participants perform a dance one by one. The participant's master will choose based on performance of individual dancer. So selection process will done on basis of dance performance of participant dancer. If there is tie i.e., when a single participant been chosen by one or more masters then decision will be in hands of judges.

Once all masters and contestants perform, judges vote on the performances.

In the basic format the show consists of three rounds, rach round the winning team will get 1 lakh INR, and three successive losses will result in elimination of losing team. At the end of each episode the best performer is awarded 1 lakh INR.

However, significant changes in the format have taken place at various seasons. A significant change in the current season DHEE 13 is the amount the winning gets differs from the 1st round to 3rd round by 1 Lakh INR each round, the remaining format remains unchanged.

== Seasons ==
Season no.	Season	Host	Winning Master (Choreographer)	Winning Contestant	Winning team Leader	Team Leaders	Judges
1	Dhee-1	Udaya Bhanu	Nobel Master	Harinath Reddy		Chaitanya & Harita	Tarun Master, Brinda
2	Dhee-2	Udaya Bhanu	ganesh master	Prudvi		N/A	Tarun Master, Rekha Prakash Master
3	Dhee-3	Udaya Bhanu	Raghu master	Satya		N/A	Rekha Prakash Master
4	Dhee-4 (Ladies Special)	Udaya Bhanu	Reetu Master	Bhavya		N/A	Brinda, Rambha
5	Dhee-5 (Jodi Special)	Udaya Bhanu	Sekhar Master	Prasad & Anusha		N/A	Rekha Prakash, Chinni Prakash
6	Dhee-6	Udaya Bhanu	Suchin Master	Anshu		N/A	Chinni Prakash, Rekha Prakash
7	Dhee Juniors-1	Niharika Konidela	Bhushan Master	Varshini	Anchor Lasya	Anchor Ravi, Anchor Lasya	Tarun Master, Sekhar Master, Sadha
8	Dhee Juniors-2	Niharika Konidela	Yashwanth Master	Sivamani	Anchor Lasya	Anchor Ravi, Anchor Lasya	TarunMaster, Sekhar Master, Sadha
9	Dhee Jodi Special	Pradeep Machiraju	Yashwanth Master	Sanketh & Priyanka	Sudigali Sudheer	Sudigali Sudheer, Rashmi Gautham	Sekhar Master, Sadha
10	Dhee 10	Pradeep Machiraju	Chitti Master	Raju	Sudigali Sudheer, Varshini Souderajan	Sudigali Sudheer, Rashmi Gautham, Varshini Sounderajan, RJ Hemanth	Sekhar Master, Priyamani, Anee Master
11	Dhee Jodi	Pradeep Machiraju	Prasanth master	Mahesh & Ritu	Rashmi Gautam	Sudigali Sudheer, Rashmi Gautam	Sekhar Master, Priyamani, Poorna
12	Dhee Champions	Pradeep Machiraju	Yashwanth Master	Piyush	Sudigali Sudheer, Rashmi Gautam	Sudigali Sudheer, Rashmi Gautam, Varshini Sounderajan, Hyper Aadi	Sekhar Master, Priyamani, Poorna
13	Dhee 13 Kings v/s Queens	Pradeep Machiraju	Ram Master	Kavyasri	Rashmi Gautam, Deepika Pilli	Sudigali Sudheer, Hyper Aadi, Rashmi Gautam, Deepika Pilli.	Ganesh, Priyamani, Poorna
14	Dhee 14 Dancing Icon	Pradeep Machiraju	Ram Master	Jatin	Hyper Aadi	Hyper Aadi, Akhil Sarthak, Susmitha, Ravi Krishna, Navya Swamy	ganesh master, jani master, priyamani, nanditha swetha, poorna, shradhha das
15	Dhee 15 championship battle	Pradeep Machiraju	Somesh master	Team S9	N/A	Hyper Aadi	Sekhar master, Shraddha Das
16	Dhee 16 Premier league	Pradeep Machiraju	Greeshma Master	Hyderabad Ustaads	N/A	Hyper Aadi	Sekhar Master, Poorna
17	Dhee 17 Celebrity Special	Nandu	Sudharshan master	Varshini Arza	N/A	Hyper Aadi	Sekhar master, Pranitha, Poorna, Ganesh Master, Hyper Aadi
18	Dhee 18 Celebrity special-2	Nandu	Abhi Master	Janu Lyri	N/A	Hyper Aadi, Sri Satya	Sekhar master, Hansika, Ganesh master
19	Dhee Jodi	Nandu	Manoj Master	Surya Teja And Hamsa	N/A	Hyper Aadi, Sri Satya	Vijay Binny, Hansika, Ganesh master
20	Dhee 20	Nandu	Chitti Master	Raju	N/A	Hyper Aadi	Vijay Binny, Regina Cassandra
21	Dhee - Double Impact	Pradeep Machiraju				Nikhi, Tejaswi	Jani Master , Anupama Parameswaran
