= Gaalodu =

2022 Telugu romantic comedy film

- Directed by: Raja Sekar Reddy Pulicharla
- Written by: Raja Sekar Reddy Pulicharla
- Produced by: Raja Sekar Reddy Pulicharla
- Starring: Sudigali Sudheer; Gehna Sippy
- Cinematography: C. Ramprasad
- Music by: Bheems Ceciroleo
- Production company: Samskruthi Films
- Release date: 18 November 2022
- Running time: 125 minutes
- Country: India
- Language: Telugu
- Box office: ₹10.46 crore

Gaalodu is a 2022 Indian Telugu-language romantic action drama film written and directed by P Rajasekhar Reddy and produced under the Samskruthi Films banner. This film stars Sudigali Sudheer and Gehna Sippy. The film's music was scored by Bheems Ceciroleo.

== Cast ==
- Sudigali Sudheer as Rajinikanth
- Gehna Sippy as Shukla
- Saptagiri
- Shakalaka Shankar
- Prudhvi
- Satya Krishnan

== Release ==
=== Theatrical ===
Gaalodu was released on 18 November 2022. Upon release, the film received positive reviews from critics.

=== Home Media ===
Digital rights of the film were acquired by aha. It was released on 17 February 2023 for streaming.

== Reception ==
=== Critical reception ===
Gaalodu received positive reviews from critics and audience.123Telugu gave 3.25 out of 5 stars and wrote "The film has an amazing story and is decent in the emotional department. The film is a regular love story but Sudigali Sudheer stands out. He is superb and has solid screen presence. Paul Nicodemus of The Times of India gave 4 out of 5 stars and wrote "Sudigali Sudheer and Gehna Sippy, sticks to its genre and comes across as an action-packed mass entertainer with a decent plot.

=== Box office ===
News18 Telugu reported the worldwide gross to be ₹5.97 crore at the box office in six days. Galodu has collected Rs.71.21 lakh on the first day, Rs.51.14 lakh on the second day, Rs.46.61 lakh on the third day, Rs.39 lakh on the fourth day, Rs.22 lakh on the fifth day total of Rs. 5.97 crore gross and Rs.2.420 crore net collections.
