= Jabardasth (TV series) =

Indian Telugu-language comedy television show

- Genre: Satire; Variety show; Sketch comedy
- Created by: ETV
- Directed by: Govada Manikanta
- Presented by: Anasuya Bharadwaj (2013–2022); Rashmi Gautam (2012– 2022); Sowmya Rao (2022–present)
- Judges: Roja (2013–2022); Naga Babu (2013–2019); Mano (2019–2022); Indraja (2022–present); Krishna Bhagavan (2022–present)
- Country of origin: India
- Original language: Telugu

Production
- Producer: Mallemala Productions
- Production locations: Annapurna Studios, Hyderabad, India
- Camera setup: Multi-camera
- Running time: 60 minutes
- Production company: Mallemala Entertainments

Original release
- Network: ETV
- Release: 7 February 2013 – present

Related
- Extra Jabardasth Sridevi Drama Company

Jabardasth is an Indian Telugu-language sketch comedy television show produced by Mallemala Entertainments. It was conceived and directed by Sanjeev K Kumar, and later directed by Sanjeev's associates Nithin and Bharat. It was premiered on ETV on 7 February 2013.

The show was hosted by Anasuya Bharadwaj, and is now hosted by Siri Hanumanth. Initially judged by actor Nagendra Babu and actress Roja, Babu left the show in 2019 with singer Mano replacing him. Jani and Sekhar have also appeared in the show as guest judges.

The show is popular among the Telugu audience, but it is criticized for its obscene and problematic content.

An extended version of the show, Extra Jabardasth began airing on 10 October 2014 and ended on 31st May 2024. It is hosted by Rashmi Gautam, is broadcasts on ETV. It has been criticized for its obscene and problematic content. It is now judged by Khushbu Sundar and Krishna Bhagavan. In June 2019, ratings for an episode were in the top five for on Telugu television. Nagendra Babu and Indraja made a re entry in Jabardasth in 2026.

== Concept ==
The concept of Jabardasth and Extra Jabardasth is, where six teams participates makes a comedy skit performance, generally sitcom which are judged by Nagendra Babu and actress Indraja to marks 10/10 by each, where the winner(s) gets cheque prize of INRs 25,000 and a poster of the week will be decided based on the skit performed by winners.

== Teams ==
Teams	Team Leaders
Hyper Adhi & Rising Raju	Hyper Adhi and Rising Raju
Chalaki Chanti and Sunami Sudhakar	Vinay Mohan and Sudhakar
Rocket Raghava	Rocket Raghava
Venky's Monkeys & Thagubothu Ramesh	Venky and Thagubothu Ramesh

== Series overview ==
Jabardasth show has been aired with three series.

=== Series 1 (2013) ===
Series 1 aired from 7 February 2013 to 15 August 2013. Six teams competed.

Team name	Team leaders	Notable team members
Dhanadhan Dhanraj	Dhanraj	Satya, Naveen,Auto RamPrasad
Chammak Chandra	Chandra Naik	
Chalaki Chanti	Vinay Mohan	Bullet Bhaskar, Phani, Tsunami Sudhakar
Rocket Raghava	Raghava	
Roller Raghu	Raghu Karumanchi	Rocking Rakesh, Josh Ravi, Amarthya
Venu Wonders	Venu (Tillu)	Chitram Srinu, Sudigali Sudheer, Getup Srinu

=== Series 2 (2013–2014) ===
Series 2 aired from 22 August 2013 to 10 October 2014.

Team name	Team leader	Notable team members
Sudigali Sudheer	Sudheer	Auto Ramprasad, Getup Srinu, Sunny
Racha Ravi	Ravi	Appa Rao

=== Series 3 (2014) ===
Series 3 debuted 17 October 2014.

Team name	Team leader	Notable team members
Super Srinu	Chitram Srinu	
Shaking Seshu	Seshu	
Hyper Aadi and raising Raju	Aadi	
Allari Harish	Harish	Bullet Bhaskar, Tsunami Sudhakar, Master Naresh
Getup Srinu	Sudheer	Ram Prasad
Rocking Rakesh	Rakesh	
Racha Ravi	Ravi	Appa Rao
Adhire Abhi	Abhinaya Krishna	
Bullet Bhaskar & Tsunami Sudhakar	Bhaskar & Sudhakar	Master Naresh
Kiraak RP	RP	
Kill Bill Vishwa	Vishwa	
Mass Avinash Kevvu Karthik	Avinash Karthik	

=== Current series ===
Teams	Auto Ramprasad	Thagubothu Ramesh & Rowdy Rohini	Rocket Raghava	Dhanadhan Dhanraj Koranani	Surprising Shyam	Bullet Bhaskar	Super Saddam	Sunami Sudhakar	Chalaki Chanti

== Controversies ==
- In December 2014, a police case has been registered against Venu Wonders team leader, Venu for allegedly insulting the working-class women's lifestyle in a skit. He was also physically attacked while the controversy was going on. Venu got support on social media from a few celebrities and commoners, who criticised the attack. A case has also been registered against some people who are believed to have attacked Venu during the issue.
- The Jabardasth episode that aired 30 October 2014 featured scenes of Brahmin characters drinking alcohol. Kethireddy Anjireddy of Thimmappur has filed a case in the court and the court has directed to register a case against the actors and judges involved in the comedy.
