= Bigg Boss (Telugu TV series) =

Telugu language reality TV game show

- Show's tenth season Logo with host Nagarjuna
- Presented by: NTR Jr. (S1); Nani (S2); Nagarjuna (S3–present)
- Country of origin: India
- Original language: Telugu
- No. of seasons: 9
- No. of episodes: 926

Production
- Production locations: Lonavala (S1); Annapurna Studios (S2–present)
- Running time: 60–90 minutes (approx.)
- Production company: Endemol Shine India

Original release
- Network: Star Maa; JioHotstar
- Release: 16 July 2017 – present

Related
- Bigg Boss; Bigg Boss Non-Stop; Bigg Boss Agnipariksha

Bigg Boss is an Indian Telugu-language television reality show of the Bigg Boss franchise which airs on Star Maa and streams on JioHotstar in India. It follows the format of the Dutch reality show Big Brother, which was first developed by Endemol in the Netherlands.

Starting in 2017, the show has rolled out nine seasons so far; Jr NTR and Nani hosted Season 1 and Season 2 respectively, while Nagarjuna is hosting the show from Season 3 onwards. Season 2, Season 6, Season 9 and Season 10 featured general public along with celebrities as housemates.

== Overview ==
Bigg Boss is based on the Dutch series Big Brother format developed by John de Mol Jr.. A number of contestants known as "housemates" live in a purpose-built house and are isolated from the rest of the world. Each week, housemates nominate two of their fellow housemates for eviction, and the housemates who receive the most nominations would face a public vote. Eventually, one housemate would leave after being "evicted" from the House. In the final week, there were five housemates remaining, and the public voted for who they wanted to win. Unlike other versions of Big Brother, the Indian version uses celebrities as housemates, In season two, Bigg Boss team selected three common people as contestants from the auditions.

=== Rules ===
While all the rules have never been told to the audience, the most prominent ones are clearly seen. The housemates are not permitted to talk in any other language except Telugu.

They always have to wear a label and They cannot leave the House premises at any time unless they are evicted or decided by Bigg Boss. They can not discuss the nomination process with anyone. They are not allowed to sleep without the permission of Bigg Boss.

=== House ===
The house for season one was set up at Lonavala. From season two onwards, the house was set up in Annapurna Studios, Hyderabad. The house is well-furnished and decorated. It has a variety of modern amenities, but just one or multiple bedrooms and four toilet bath rooms. There is a garden, pool, activity area, gym, jail and lounge room in the house. There is also a Confession Room, where the housemates may be called in by Bigg Boss for any kind of conversation, and for the nomination process. In season three, courtyard part was added and in season seven, balcony was added in the house.

=== Broadcast ===
Bigg Boss is aired on Star Maa and also available on JioHotstar. Everyday episodes contain the main happenings of the previous day. Every Sunday episode mainly focuses on an interview of an evicted contestant by the host. The unseen episode will be available as Bigg Boss Buzzz on Star Maa Music and JioHotstar.

== Series details ==
Series	Host	House Location	Episodes	Originally released			Housemates	Days	Launch TRP Ratings	Finale TRP Ratings	Prize Money	Winner	Runner up
Series	Host	House Location	Episodes	First released	Last released	Network	Housemates	Days	Launch TRP Ratings	Finale TRP Ratings	Prize Money	Winner	Runner up
1	NTR Jr.	Lonavala, Pune	71	16 July 2017	24 September 2017	Star Maa, Disney+ Hotstar	16	70	16.18 TVR	14.23 TVR	₹50 lakh (US$52,000)	Siva Balaji	Aadarsh Balakrishna
2	Nani	Annapurna Studios, Hyderabad	113	10 June 2018	30 September 2018	Star Maa, Disney+ Hotstar	18	112	15.0 TVR	15.05 TVR	₹50 lakh (US$52,000)	Kaushal Manda	Geetha Madhuri
3	Nagarjuna	Annapurna Studios, Hyderabad	106	21 July 2019	3 November 2019	Star Maa, Disney+ Hotstar	17	105	17.92 TVR	18.29 TVR	₹50 lakh (US$52,000)	Rahul Sipligunj	Sreemukhi
4	Nagarjuna	Annapurna Studios, Hyderabad	106	6 September 2020	20 December 2020	Star Maa, Disney+ Hotstar	19	105	18.5 TVR	21.7 TVR	₹25 lakh (US$26,000) (Note: However, the winner was awarded only ₹25 lakh after the 2nd runner-up opted to walk out with ₹25 lakh.)	Abijeet	Akhil Sarthak
5	Nagarjuna	Annapurna Studios, Hyderabad	106	5 September 2021	19 December 2021	Star Maa, Disney+ Hotstar	19	105	18 TVR	18.4 TVR	₹50 lakh (US$52,000) (Note: The winner awarded with ₹50 lakh, a bike and a plot with worth ₹25 lakh.)	VJ Sunny	Shanmukh Jaswanth
6	Nagarjuna	Annapurna Studios, Hyderabad	106	4 September 2022	18 December 2022	Star Maa, Disney+ Hotstar	21	105	8.86 TVR	8.17 TVR	₹10 lakh (US$10,000) (Note: However, the winner was awarded only ₹10 lakh, a car and a plot with worth ₹25 lakh, after the runner up opted to walk out with ₹40 lakh.)	L. V. Revanth	Shrihan Shaik
7	Nagarjuna	Annapurna Studios, Hyderabad	106	3 September 2023	17 December 2023	Star Maa, Disney+ Hotstar	19	105	18.1 TVR	21.7 TVR	₹35 lakh (US$36,000) (Note: However, the winner was awarded with ₹35 lakh, ₹15 lakh worth diamond jewelry and a luxurious car, after the 3rd runner up opted to walk out with ₹15 lakh.)	Pallavi Prashanth	Amardeep Chowdary
8	Nagarjuna	Annapurna Studios, Hyderabad	106	1 September 2024	15 December 2024	Star Maa, Disney+ Hotstar	22	105	18.9 TVR	8.86 TVR	₹55 lakh (US$57,000)	Nikhil Maliyakkal	Gautham Krishna
9	Nagarjuna	Annapurna Studios, Hyderabad	106	7 September 2025	21 December 2025	Star Maa, JioHotstar	22	105	13.7 TVR	19.6 TVR	₹35 lakh (US$36,000) (Note: However, the winner was awarded only with ₹35 lakh, an additional ₹5 lakh from a sponsor and a luxurious car, after the 2nd runner up opted to walk out with ₹15 lakh.)	Kalyan Padala	Thanuja Puttaswamy
10	Nagarjuna	Annapurna Studios, Hyderabad	57	6 September 2026	TBA	Star Maa, JioHotstar	23	56	TBA	TBA	₹35 lakh (US$36,000)	TBA	TBA

== Housemate pattern ==
Clique	Season 1	Season 2	Season 3	Season 4	Season 5	Season 6	Season 7	Season 8	Season 9	Season 10
Film / TV actor	Aadarsh Balakrishna	Amit Tiwari	Ali Reza	Abijeet	Hamida Khatoon	Arjun Kalyan	Amardeep Chowdary	Abhay Bethiganti	Ayesha Zeenath	Chaitra Rai
Film / TV actor	Archana Shastry	Bhanu Sree	Hema	Akhil Sarthak	Lahari Shari	Baladitya	Arjun	Aditya Om	Bharani Shankar	Dakkshi Guttikonda
Film / TV actor	Archana Shastry	Bhanu Sree	Hema	Akhil Sarthak	Lahari Shari	Baladitya	Ashwini Sri	Avinash	Bharani Shankar	Dakkshi Guttikonda
Film / TV actor	Dhanraj	Kaushal Manda	Himaja	Avinash	Maanas	Chanti	Gautham Krishna	Gautham Krishna	Emanuel	Debjani Modak
Film / TV actor	Diksha Panth	Kaushal Manda	Himaja	Avinash	Maanas	Faima Sheikh	Gautham Krishna	Gautham Krishna	Emanuel	Debjani Modak
Film / TV actor	Hari Teja	Kireeti Damaraju	Mahesh Vitta	Divi Vadathya	Priyanka Singh	Inaya Sultana	Kiran Rathod	Hari Teja	Flora Saini	Krishnudu
Film / TV actor	Jyothi	Kireeti Damaraju	Mahesh Vitta	Divi Vadathya	Priyanka Singh	Keerthi Bhat	Pooja Murthy	Naga Manikanta	Flora Saini	Krishnudu
Film / TV actor	Mumaith Khan	Nandini Rai	Punarnavi Bhupalam	Karate Kalyani	Shailaja Priya	Marina Abraham	Priyanka Jain	Nikhil Maliyakkal	Gaurav Gupta	Mukesh Gowda
Film / TV actor	Navdeep	Pooja Ramachandran	Ravi Krishna	Kumar Sai	Siri Hanmanth	Rohit Sahni	Rathika Rose	Prerana Kambam	Nikhil Nair	Naresh
Film / TV actor	Prince Cecil	Pooja Ramachandran	Ravi Krishna	Kumar Sai	Siri Hanmanth	Shani Salmon	Rathika Rose	Prithviraj Shetty	Sanjana	Ram Prasad
Film / TV actor	Sameer Hasan	Samrat Reddy	Rohini Reddy	Monal Gajjar	VJ Sunny	Sri Satya	Shakeela	Rohini Reddy	Srinivas Sai	Shivakumar Marihal
Film / TV actor	Sampoornesh Babu	Tanish	Varun Sandesh	Swathi Deekshith	Swetha Varma	Sudeepa Pinky	Shobha Shetty	Seetha	Suman Setty	Thrigun
Film / TV actor	Siva Balaji	Tejaswi Madivada	Vithika Sheru	Syed Sohel	Uma Devi	Vasanthi Krishnan	Sivaji	Sonia Akula	Thanuja Puttaswamy	Vamsi Krishna
Film / TV actor	Siva Balaji	Tejaswi Madivada	Vithika Sheru	Syed Sohel	Vishwa Raj	Vasanthi Krishnan	Subhashree	Yashmi Gowda	Thanuja Puttaswamy	Vamsi Krishna
TV Host / Presenter	None	Syamala	Shilpa Chakravarthy	Ariyana Glory	Lobo Khayyum	Neha Chowdary	None	Vishnupriyaa	Rithu Chowdary	Sudheer Reddy
TV Host / Presenter	None	Syamala	Sreemukhi	Lasya Manjunath	Ravi Kiran	Neha Chowdary	None	Vishnupriyaa	Rithu Chowdary	Varshini Sounderajan
News Reader	Kathi Karthika	Deepthi Nallamuthu	Jaffar Babu	Devi Nagavalli	None	Arohi Rao	None	None	None	None
News Reader	Kathi Karthika	Deepthi Nallamuthu	Siva Jyothi	Sujatha	None	Arohi Rao	None	None	None	None
Music personality	Kalpana Raghavendar	Geetha Madhuri	Rahul Sipligunj	Noel Sean	Sreerama Chandra	L. V. Revanth	Bhole Shavali	None	Ramu Rathod	None
Music personality	Madhu Priya	Roll Rida	Rahul Sipligunj	Noel Sean	Sreerama Chandra	L. V. Revanth	Damini	None	Ramu Rathod	None
Radio Jockey	None	None	None	None	Kajal Seelamsetty	Surya Narayana	None	Shekar Basha	None	None
Model	None	None	None	None	Jaswanth	Raja Shekar	Prince Yawar	None	None	None
Film Critic / Humanist	Mahesh Kathi	Babu Gogineni	Tamanna Simhadhri	None	None	None	None	None	None	None
Choreographer	None	None	Baba Bhaskar	Amma Rajasekhar	Anee	Abhinayashree	Sandeep	Nainika Anasuru	Shrasti Verma	Neethu Natraj
Choreographer	None	None	Baba Bhaskar	Amma Rajasekhar	Nataraj	Abhinayashree	Sandeep	Nainika Anasuru	Shrasti Verma	Neethu Natraj
Film Director	None	None	None	Surya Kiran	None	None	None	None	None	None
Internet personality	None	Deepthi Sunaina	Ashu Reddy	Alekhya Harika	Sarayu Roy	Geetu	Nayani Pavani	Gangavva	Divvala Madhuri	Swetha Naidu
Internet personality	None	Deepthi Sunaina	Ashu Reddy	Alekhya Harika	Sarayu Roy	Geetu	Nayani Pavani	Madhoo Nekkanti	Divvala Madhuri	Swetha Naidu
Internet personality	None	Deepthi Sunaina	Ashu Reddy	Gangavva	Sarayu Roy	Geetu	Pallavi Prasanth	Mehaboob Shaikh	Divvala Madhuri	Swetha Naidu
Internet personality	None	Deepthi Sunaina	Ashu Reddy	Gangavva	Shanmukh Jaswanth	Shrihan	Pallavi Prasanth	Nabeel Afridi	Ramya Moksha	Swetha Naidu
Internet personality	None	Deepthi Sunaina	Ashu Reddy	Mehaboob Shaikh	Shanmukh Jaswanth	Shrihan	Teja	Nayani Pavani	Ramya Moksha	Swetha Naidu
Internet personality	None	Deepthi Sunaina	Ashu Reddy	Mehaboob Shaikh	Shanmukh Jaswanth	Shrihan	Teja	Teja	Ramya Moksha	Swetha Naidu
Commoner	None	Ganesh	None	None	None	Adi Reddy	None	None	Demon Pavan	Aman Masood
Commoner	None	Ganesh	None	None	None	Adi Reddy	None	None	Divya Nikhita	Apoorva
Commoner	None	Ganesh	None	None	None	Adi Reddy	None	None	Harita Harish	Charan Mahadev
Commoner	None	Nutan Naidu	None	None	None	Adi Reddy	None	None	Kalyan Padala	Jhansi
Commoner	None	Nutan Naidu	None	None	None	Adi Reddy	None	None	Kalyan Padala	Mithilesh Reddy
Commoner	None	Nutan Naidu	None	None	None	Adi Reddy	None	None	Maryada Manish	Rama Krishna
Commoner	None	Sanjana Anne	None	None	None	Adi Reddy	None	None	Priya Shetty	Rohit Naidu Patnam
Commoner	None	Sanjana Anne	None	None	None	Adi Reddy	None	None	Srija Dammu	Shalini Patel
Commoner	None	Sanjana Anne	None	None	None	Adi Reddy	None	None	Srija Dammu	Shiva Srishti Vyakaranam
Total	16	18	17	19	19	21	19	22	22	23
Winner Runner-up Finalist

== Spin-offs ==
=== Bigg Boss Non-Stop ===
The series is also set to roll out a digital version of the show called Bigg Boss Non-Stop, which was also hosted by Nagarjuna and broadcast by Disney+ Hotstar for 24×7 coverage.

=== Bigg Boss Agnipariksha ===
It is a digital pre-show of the main Bigg Boss. It will feature contestants from selected commoners to earn their spot in the main house. The show began in August 2025 ahead of the ninth season.

== Reception ==
=== Season 1 ===
Bigg Boss Telugu programme is regarded as the most expensive Telugu television show. The launch of season 1 opened with 16.18 TVR and became as the most watched Telugu television show.

=== Season 2 ===
The launch of season 2 opened with 15.05 TVR.

=== Season 3 ===
The launch of season 3 opened with 17.9 TVR, which is bigger than the previous seasons. The grand finale of season 3 of duration four and half hours scored 18.29 TVR being the highest ever rating achieved by the Bigg Boss Indian franchise. The last hour of telecast, featuring Chiranjeevi as chief guest, alone garnered 22.4 TVR.

=== Season 4 ===
The launch of season 4 opened with 18.5 TVR higher than previous seasons. On Week 7, Samantha Akkineni hosted the show, while main host Nagarjuna is in Manali for his movie shooting and the episode was also extended to 3 hours, from the usual 1½ hours and the episode opened with 11.4 TVR, which was higher trp among all the weekends. The grand finale of season 4 became most watched and created a record with viewership as it garnered highest TRP rating of 21.7 TVR among all seasons of Bigg Boss editions.

=== Season 5 ===
The launch of fifth season has received about 17.7 TVR in general and 18 TVR with HD viewership and also, the latest rating proves that show's popularity has remained intact. The grand finale episode had secured 18.4 TVR and millions of views on Disney+ Hotstar.

=== Season 6 ===
The launch episode opened with 8.86 TVR, while finale episode received 8.17 TVR and recorded has lowest TRPs in the history of the reality TV series in Telugu. The week's average TVR for this season failed to surpass the bar set by its predecessors, too.

=== Season 7 ===
The grand finale of season 7 garnered TRP ratings of 21.7 TVR.

=== Season 8 ===
The launch episode received TRP ratings of 18.9 TVR.

=== Season 9 ===
The launch episode received TRP ratings of 13.7 TVR .The weekly average TRP of the season crossed 11 TVR and weekends got a 14 TVR which is highest among the previous five seasons as per the BARC Ratings.

=== Season 10 ===
Bigg Boss Telugu 10 is the tenth season.

This season turned out to be Celebrities vs. Commoners. The celebrities pushed all the commoners off their team, forcing them to form a team of their own. Because there were more celebrities in the house, BIGGBOSS management initiated an unfair voting process. Instead of considering audience votes, they introduced a new system that eliminated contestants based on the majority of housemate votes.

Since the celebrities outnumbered the commoners, they have eliminated three contestants so far, including a potential season winner as he topped every week polling charts, Rohit Naidu Patnam. He chose not to return to the show even after management asked him to come back due to a significant drop in the show's TRP. Additionally, the BB team and the host supported the celebrities and cornered the commoners by not showing footage of the celebrities to the general audience.

== Companion shows ==
=== Bigg Boss Buzzz ===
Bigg Boss Buzzz is an Indian Telugu-language Television talk show with evicted housemates of reality television series Bigg Boss Telugu. From season 3 onwards, the show features evicted housemates interview with previous season contestant as a host and also unseen portions of episodes that were not aired on television will be aired on Star Maa Music.

Season	Title	Host	Notes
3	Bigg Boss 3 Buzzz	Tanish	Second runner-up of Season 2
4	Bigg Boss 4 Buzzz	Rahul Sipligunj	Winner of Season 3
5	Bigg Boss 5 Buzzz	Ariyana Glory	Third runner-up of Season 4
6	Bigg Boss 6 Buzzz	Shiva	Second Runner-up of BB Non-Stop 1
7	Bigg Boss 7 Buzzz	Geetu	Contestant of Season 6
8	Bigg Boss 8 Buzzz	Ambati Arjun	Fifth Runner-up of Season 7
9	Bigg Boss 9 Buzzz	Sivaji	Second Runner-up of Season 7
10	Bigg Boss 10 Buzzz	Sivaji	Second Runner-up of Season 7

=== BB Cafe ===
BB Cafe is an review based show about the reality television series Bigg Boss Telugu. From season 6 onwards, The show features previous seasons contestants as host and will discusses all the topics of Bigg Boss episodes. The show will continue to give more clarity on war, love and other interesting topics between the contestants and it premiers on Star Maa Music.

Season	Title	Host	Notes
6	BB Cafe	Ariyana Glory	3rd Runner-up of Season 4 and BB Non-Stop 1

== See also ==
- BB Jodi Telugu
- Neethone Dance
