= Bigg Boss (Telugu TV series) season 6 =

Reality TV game show – Telugu language

Bigg Boss
- Season 6
- Season 6 eye logo
- Presented by: Akkineni Nagarjuna
- No. of days: 105
- No. of housemates: 21
- Winner: L. V. Revanth
- Runner-up: Shrihan
- No. of episodes: 106

Release
- Original network: Star Maa; Disney+ Hotstar
- Original release: 4 September – 18 December 2022

Season chronology
- ← Previous; Season 5 Next → Season 7

Bigg Boss 6 is a reality show and the sixth season of the Telugu version of the Indian reality television series Bigg Boss based on the Dutch series Big Brother and produced by Endemol Shine India (now merged with Banijay). The show was launched on 4 September 2022 on Star Maa and Disney+ Hotstar.

== Production ==
On 26 May 2022, the makers of the show released a promo where Nagarjuna announced that commoners can participate in season 6. The auditions were done by the starmaa.startv.com website. The show organizers officially released a teaser using the show's logo on 4 August 2022. On 9 August 2022, a new teaser was released with Nagarjuna as a host and promo shoot directed by Prasanth Varma. On 19 August 2022, it was confirmed that the show would premiere on 4 September 2022 on Star Maa and Disney+ Hotstar.

=== 24x7 streaming ===
The show streamed on a 24-hour live stream, from Monday to Friday.on Disney+ Hotstar and an hour-long episode every day on Star Maa.

== Housemates status ==
Sr	Housemate	Day entered	Day exited	Status
1	Revanth	Day 1	Day 105	Winner
2	Shrihan	Day 1	Day 105	1st Runner-up,Walked
3	Keerthi	Day 1	Day 105	2nd Runner-up
4	Adi	Day 1	Day 105	3rd Runner-up
5	Rohit	Day 1	Day 105	4th Runner-up
6	Sri	Day 1	Day 103	Evicted
7	Inaya	Day 1	Day 98	Evicted
8	Faima	Day 1	Day 91	Evicted
9	Raj	Day 1	Day 84	Evicted
10	Marina	Day 1	Day 77	Evicted
11	Vasanthi	Day 1	Day 70	Evicted
12	Aditya	Day 1	Day 69	Evicted
13	Geethu	Day 1	Day 63	Evicted
14	Surya	Day 1	Day 55	Evicted
15	Arjun	Day 1	Day 49	Evicted
16	Sudeepa	Day 1	Day 42	Evicted
17	Chanti	Day 1	Day 35	Evicted
18	Arohi	Day 1	Day 28	Evicted
19	Neha	Day 1	Day 21	Evicted
20	Abhinaya	Day 1	Day 14	Evicted
21	Shani	Day 1	Day 13	Evicted

== Housemates ==
The participants in the order of appearance and entered in the house are:

=== Original entrants ===
- Keerthi Bhat – Television actress. She is best known for her role as Bhanumathi in the Telugu TV series Manasichi Choodu and Dr. Hima Karthik in Karthika Deepam (Telugu TV series).
- Sudeepa Pinky – Film and television actress. She is best known for her role as Pinky in the film Nuvvu Naaku Nachav (2001) Bommarillu and Revathy in the TV show Aa Okkati Adakku.
- Shrihan Shaik – YouTuber
- Neha Chowdary – Television presenter known for her appearance in Pro Kabaddi League, Indian Premier League and other sporting events
- Chalaki Chanti – Film and television actor. He is best known for his work in Jabardasth.
- Sri Satya – Television actress, model and YouTuber. She has appeared in shows such as Akka Chellelu and Trinayani.
- Arjun Kalyan – Film actor.
- Geetu Royal – Radio jockey, YouTuber and television actress. She has appeared in the comedy show Jabardasth.
- Abhinaya Shree – Film actress. She is known for her work in the films Arya (2004) Hangama and Paisalo Paramatma (2007).
- Marina Abraham – Television actress. She is known for her role as Samantha in the drama series America Ammayi.
- Rohit Sahni –Television actor.
- Bala Aditya – Film and television actor. He is known for his performance in the films Anna (1994), Little Soldiers (1996) and 1940 Lo Oka Gramam (2010).
- Vasanthi Krishnan – Film actress. She is recognized for her work in the film Cauliflower (2021).
- Shani Salmon – Film actor. He is known for his work in the film Sye (2004).
- Inaya Sulthana – Film and voice actress.
- RJ Surya Narayana – Radio jockey, television actor and mimic. He is popular for his work in various radio shows of Red FM 93.5 and the TV show Ismart News of TV9.
- Faima Sheikh – Television actress. She is best known for her work in Jabardasth.
- Adi Reddy – YouTuber. He is known for producing videos reviewing the Bigg Boss show.
- Raj Shekar – Model.
- Arohi Rao – Television presenter and actress. She is known for her work in the TV show Ismart News of TV9.
- L. V. Revanth – Playback singer, television presenter, winner of Indian Idol 9, and winner of Big Boss Telugu Season 6.

== Related shows ==
=== Bigg Boss 6 Buzzz ===
Bigg Boss 6 Buzzz is an Indian Telugu-language television talk show about the reality television series Bigg Boss Telugu. The show premiered on 5 September 2022 on Star Maa Music and unaired portions of episodes are streamed on Disney+ Hotstar and aired on Star Maa Music.

=== Winner Declaration ===
In the finale, Nagarjuna initially offered Shrihan ₹25 lakhs, which was later increased to ₹40 lakhs in an attempt to tempt him. Shrihan accepted the money and walked away with the suitcase, making Revanth the winner. However, at the end of the episode, Nagarjuna revealed that Shrihan had received more votes in the popular vote.It has been the first time in Bigg Boss history that the top two contestants were offered money suitcase to walk away with leaving the other contestant ultimately declared as the winner , it actually happened as one of the top two left the house with a huge sum leaving the other being declared as winner . The usual convention of the host holding the hands of the top two and declaring the winner did not have a place in this season .

=== BB Cafe ===
BB Cafe is a review-based show about the reality television series Bigg Boss Telugu. The host Ariyana Glory discusses topics of Bigg Boss Season 6 Monday to Friday. The show premiered on 5 September 2022 on Star Maa Music. The host Shiva conducts the evictee interview show with the evicted contestants every Monday.
