= Bigg Boss (Telugu TV series) season 2 =

Bigg Boss
- Season 2
- Season 2 eye logo
- Presented by: Nani
- No. of days: 112
- No. of housemates: 18
- Winner: Kaushal Manda
- Runner-up: Geetha Madhuri
- No. of episodes: 113

Release
- Original network: Star Maa
- Original release: June 10 – September 30, 2018

Season chronology
- ← Previous; Season 1 Next → Season 3

Bigg Boss 2 is the second season of the Telugu-language version of the Indian reality television series Bigg Boss. It premiered on 10 June 2018 on Star Maa. Nani hosted the show. It was the second longest season (112 days) in Indian versions of Bigg Boss. Unlike the first season, this season featured general public along with celebrities as housemates. For this season of Bigg Boss, a lavish house set has been constructed in Backlots of Annapurna Studios 7 Acres, Jubilee Hills, Hyderabad.

The season was extended by one week (112 days) instead of the actual 105 days format of the show. Among the five finalists, Kaushal Manda emerged as the winner with highest number of public votes, followed by Geetha Madhuri as runner-up, Tanish Alladi, Deepti Nallamothu and Samrat Reddy as third, fourth and fifth respectively.

== Housemates status ==
Housemate	Day entered	Day exited	Status
Kaushal	Day 1	Day 112	Winner
Geetha	Day 1	Day 112	1st Runner up
Tanish	Day 1	Day 112	2nd Runner-up
Deepti	Day 1	Day 112	3rd Runner up
Samrat	Day 1	Day 112	4th Runner up
Roll Rida	Day 1	Day 105	Evicted
Amit	Day 1	Day 98	Evicted
Syamala	Day 1	Day 28	Evicted By Housemates
Syamala	Day 54	Day 91	Evicted
Nutan	Day 1	Day 14	Evicted
Nutan	Day 54	Day 68	Walked
Nutan	Day 75	Day 84	Evicted
Ganesh	Day 1	Day 83	Evicted
Pooja	Day 45	Day 77	Evicted
Deepthi S	Day 1	Day 70	Evicted
Babu G	Day 1	Day 63	Evicted
Nandini	Day 8	Day 56	Evicted
Tejaswi	Day 1	Day 42	Evicted
Bhanu Sri	Day 1	Day 35	Evicted
Kireeti	Day 1	Day 21	Evicted
Sanjana	Day 1	Day 7	Evicted

== Housemates ==
Left host Nani, Middle winner Kaushal Manda, right guest Venkatesh

=== Original entrants ===
The participants in the order they entered the house are:

==== Celebrities ====
1. Geetha Madhuri - Singer
2. Amit Tiwari - Actor
3. Deepti Nallamothu - TV9 Anchor
4. Tanish - Actor
5. Babu Gogineni - Indian humanist, rationalist and human rights activist
6. Bhanu Sree - Actress
7. Roll Rida - Rapper and singer
8. Syamala - Anchor and actress
9. Kireeti Damaraju - Actor
10. Deepthi Sunaina - Social media personality and actress
11. Kaushal Manda - Actor and model
12. Tejaswi Madivada - Actress
13. Samrat Reddy - Actor and cricketer

==== Commoners ====
1. Ganesh - Radio Jockey, Vijayawada.
2. Sanjana Anne - Model, Miss Hyderabad, Miss India Participant, Vijayawada.
3. Nutan Naidu - Social Activist, Visakhapatnam.

==== Wild Card ====
1. Nandini Rai - Actress, Model
2. Pooja Ramachandran - Actress, Model

== Reception ==
- Host Nani has been targeted for biased hosting. Later, host Nani responded to accusations of bias and replied that he is not biased and he treats every housemate equally.
- The audience expressed their annoyance with host Nani, Star Maa and producer Endemol Shine India about voting and evictions of the show.

== Guests ==
Week(s)	Guest(s)	Notes
Week 2	Srinivas Reddy and Vennela Kishore	To promote the film Jamba Lakidi Pamba.
Week 4	Sai Dharam Tej and Anupama Parameswaran	To promote the film Tej I Love You
Week 6	Pradeep Machiraju	To inform about his new show - Pradeep's Pelli Choopulu
Week 6	Lakshmi Manchu	To promote the film W/O Ram
Week 8	Kamal Haasan, Pooja Kumar, Ghibran, and Shamdat Sainudeen	To promote the film Vishwaroopam II
Week 11	Anasuya Bharadwaj	As a guest to Mehendi Task
Week 11	Taapsee Pannu, Aadhi Pinisetty and Ritika Singh	To promote the film Neevevaro
Week 11	Host Nani	On the occasion of Raksha Bandhan festival.
Week 13	Raja Goutham & Chandini Chowdary	To Promote the film Manu
Week 13	Allari Naresh & Sunil	To Promote the film Silly Fellows
Week 14	All Housemates family members	As a part of weeks luxury budget task
Week 14	One Joker and six unknown people	To irritate housemates and stolen food from the house, While housemates are in freeze command by Bigg Boss
Week 16	Sudheer Babu and Nabha Natesh	To promote the film Nannu Dochukunduvate.
Week 16	Vangaveeti Santhosh (Common Audience)	Winner of amazon wild card entry contest entered the house to meet and present some gifts to all housemates.
Week 16	All Evicted contestants except Nutan Naidu on day 110	As a guests to family party of Bigg Boss 2.
Week 16	Beauticians on day 111	To give contestants a makeovers for the grand finale.
Week 16	Venkatesh Daggubati on day 112	To present the trophy to the winner.
