= Amit Tiwari =

Indian film actor

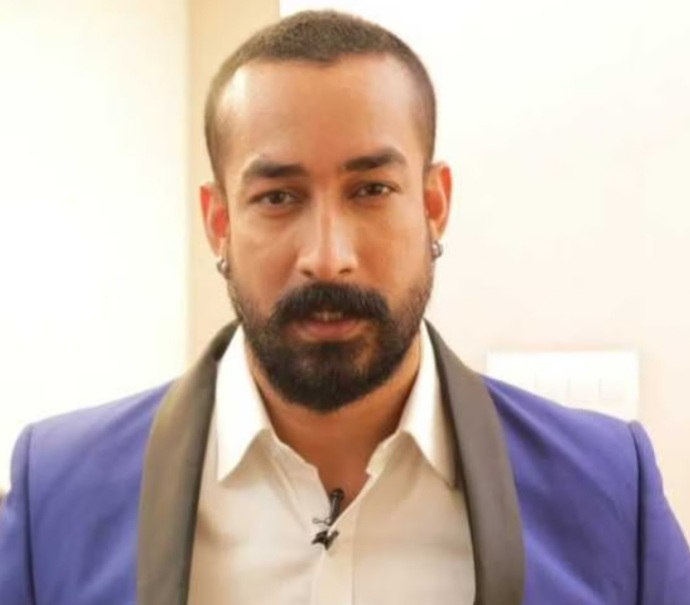
- Born: Amit Kumar; 6 February 1980 (age 46); Mumbai, Maharashtra, India
- Other name: Munna
- Occupations: Actor, Model
- Years active: 2004–present
- Spouse: Pooja Amit Kumar

Amit Tiwari (born 6 February 1980) is an actor from India who predominantly works in Telugu films. He is known for playing antagonist roles in films such as Vikramarkudu (2006), Lakshyam (2007), Rowdy Rathore (2012) and Temper (2015). He was a contestant in the second season of the reality Telugu reality television show Bigg Boss in 2018, where he finished in the seventh place and was evicted on day 98.

== Career ==
Amit starred in many films from back in 2004 till date, mostly in villainous roles.

Amit participated in the second season of Bigg Boss, the reality TV show which was hosted by Nani. The show aired on Star Maa. Amit finished in the seventh place.

== Filmography ==
=== Telugu films ===
Year	Title	Role	Notes
2004	Yuvasena		
2004	Sakhiya	Raja	
2005	Anukokunda Oka Roju	Bhaskar "Bojo"	
2005	Super	Eve teaser	
2005	Nayakudu		
2005	Meenakshi	Sanjay	Lead role
2006	Style		
2006	Pokiri		
2006	Vikramarkudu	Munna	
2006	Veerabhadra		
2006	Stalin	Goon	
2006	Rakhi	Madhukar	
2007	Lakshyam	Shafi	
2008	Aatadista	Bonala Shankar's son	
2008	Ready		
2009	Fitting Master	Meghna's brother	
2009	Naa Style Veru	Henchman	
2010	Betting Bangaraju		
2010	Cara Majaka		
2010	Khaleja	GK's son	
2011	Brahmi Gadi Katha	Rahul	
2011	Amayakudu		
2011	Oosaravelli	Ajju Bhai's henchman	
2011	Panjaa	Goon	
2012	Nuvvekkadunte Nenakkadunta		
2012	Julayi	Bittu's henchman	
2012	Adhinayakudu		
2013	Attarintiki Daredi	Siddhappa Naidu's henchman	
2013	Mr. Manmadha		
2014	1: Nenokkadine		
2014	Prabhanjanam		
2014	Yevadu	Charan's college mate	
2014	Rising of Sarpanch		
2014	Oka Laila Kosam	Jojo	
2014	Jaihind 2		
2015	Temper	Mani	
2015	Jil	Chota Nayak's brother	
2015	S/O Satyamurthy	Pallavi's cousin	
2015	Shivam		
2016	Nannaku Prematho	JD	
2017	Valla Desam		
2017	Oxygen	Captain Amith	
2017	Paisa Vasool	Sunny	
2018	Rangasthalam		
2020	Run	Khaleel	
2021	Most Eligible Bachelor	Amit	
2022	Shasana Sabha	Durga	
2022	Sundarangudu		
2024	RAM		
2024	Anthima Theerpu		
2025	Sankranthiki Vasthunam	Chota Nayak	
2026	Gaayapadda Simham	Officer Surya Vamsi	

=== Tamil films ===
Year	Title	Role
2006	Madrasi	
2006	Vathiyar	Arjun
2010	Kutti Pisasu	Nanjappan's friend
2011	Siruthai	Munna
2011	Vedi	Rajapandi
2014	Veeram	Vanangamudi's son
2014	Virattu	
2014	Jaihind 2	Nandhini's brother
2015	Vedalam	Aniket's henchman
2018	Jarugandi	Human Trafficker
2019	Vantha Rajavathaan Varuven	Pandithurai's third son
2022	The Legend	VJ’s henchman
2024	Lal Salaam	Shamsuddin's attacker

=== Kannada films ===
Year	Title	Role
2008	Arjun	Rahul alias Mama North
2010	Bombat Car	
2016	Jaggu Dada	Sakhti, Subhash Bhai's brother
2016	Nagarahavu	
2019	Kurukshetra	Kaurava army warrior

=== Films in other languages ===
Year	Title	Role	Language	Ref.
2012	Rowdy Rathore	Munna	Hindi	
2017	Tiyaan	Ramnath Gujjar	Malayalam	
2023	Har Har Gange		Bhojpuri	
2023	Kisi Ka Bhai Kisi Ki Jaan	Kodati Ishwar	Hindi	
2023	Bandra		Malayalam	

=== Television ===
Year	Title	Role	Network	Ref.
2024	Paruvu	Kalloji	ZEE5	
2025	Arabia Kadali	Saleem	Amazon Prime Video	
