= Hari Teja =

Indian actress and television presenter (born 1992)

- Born: 24 February 1992 (age 33); Tirupati, Andhra Pradesh, India
- Occupations: Actress, Kuchipudi dancer
- Years active: 2007–present

Hari Teja is an Indian actress and television presenter, who works in Telugu films and television shows. She entered Bigg Boss1 and became second runner-up. She is also a professional Kuchipudi dancer.

== Early and personal life ==
Hari Teja was born on 24 February 1992 to a Marathi father and Kannadathi mother in Tirupathi, Andhra Pradesh, India. Her father is a BSNL employee.

She has been trained in Kuchipudi dance and singing from childhood. After completing her schooling and graduation, she chose media as a career. She is married to Deepak.

== Career ==
Teja started her career in Telugu TV serials and by anchoring TV shows. She featured in some of the prominent TV serials like Manasu Mamatha and Muthyamantha Pasupu. She was anchor of the ETV Telugu cookery show Abhiruchi. She later acted in Telugu films including A Aa, Dikkulu Choodaku Ramayya, Andari Bandhuvaya, Dammu, Duvvada Jagannadham, Anaganaga O Dheerudu, Winner, Attarintiki Daredi, Ungarala Rambabu, and Raja the Great. Her role as Mangamma in A Aa directed by Trivikram Srinivas bought her more audience notice and fame.

She was one of the 16 participants on Season 1 of the Bigg Boss game show on Star Maa television, and reached the final week for the title. She finished the show at 3rd place.

== Filmography ==
=== Television ===
| Year | Title | Role | Channel | Notes |
|---|---|---|---|---|
| 2007-2008 | Chinnari | Anitha | Gemini TV | |
| 2010 | Raktha Sambandham | Bharathi | Gemini TV | |
| 2011-2012 | Kanyadhanam | Kalyani | Zee Telugu | |
| 2011-2016 | Manasu Mamatha | Archana, Surya Teja, Jayanthi | ETV Telugu | |
| 2013 | Abhishekam | Pallavi | ETV Telugu | |
| 2015 | Thaali kattu Shubhavela | Bhuvana | Star Maa | |
| 2015 | Sivaranjani | Rajini | Star Maa | |
| 2015 | Sell Me The Answer | Contestant | Star Maa | |
| 2017 | Bigg Boss 1 | Contestant | Star Maa | 3rd place |
| 2017 | Fidaa Mee Favourite Star Tho | Host | Gemini TV | |
| 2018 | Maharani | Contestant | Zee Telugu | |
| 2018 | Sixth Sense | Contestant | Staar Maa | |
| 2018 | Cash Dorikinanta Dochuko | Contestant | ETV Telugu | |
| 2018 | Patas Full To Bindaas | Guest | ETV Plus | |
| 2018 | Block Buster | Contestant | Gemini TV | |
| 2018 | Sogasu Chuda Tarama | Host | Gemini TV | |
| 2018 | Pandaga Chesko | Host | ETV Telugu | |
| 2019 | Super Singer | Host | Star Maa | |
| 2019 | Pandaga Chesko | Host | ETV Telugu | |
| 2020 | Bigg Boss 4 | Guest | Star Maa | |
| 2021 | Lucky Chance | Host | ETV Telugu | |
| 2024 | Bigg Boss 8 | Contestant | Star Maa | |

=== Films ===
- All films are in Telugu, unless otherwise noted.

Key
| † | Denotes films that have not yet been released |

| Year | Title | Role | Notes |
|---|---|---|---|
| 2007 | Aadavari Matalaku Arthale Verule | Keerti's cousin | |
| 2009 | Villagelo Vinayakudu | Kavya's sister | |
| 2010 | Andari Bandhuvaya | Paddu's elder sister | |
| 2011 | Anaganaga O Dheerudu | Chitra | |
| 2012 | Dammu | Rama Chandra's Elder sister | |
| 2013 | Attarintiki Daredi | Neelamani | |
| 2014 | Dikkulu Choodaku Ramayya | Vasundara | |
| 2014 | 1: Nenokkadine | | |
| 2016 | A Aa | Mangamma (Samantha's Maid) | |
| 2017 | Winner | Hariteja | |
| 2017 | Duvvada Jagannadham | DJ's sister | |
| 2017 | Ungarala Rambabu | Parnika | |
| 2017 | Nene Raju Nene Mantri | Kavya | |
| 2017 | Raja the Great | Lucky's aunt | |
| 2018 | Krishnarjuna Yudham | Shankar's wife | |
| 2018 | Sammohanam | Ramya | |
| 2018 | Jamba Lakidi Pamba | Suchitra | |
| 2018 | Srinivasa Kalyanam | Shanti | |
| 2018 | U Turn | Sundar's Wife | Also shot in Tamil |
| 2018 | Aravinda Sametha Veera Raghava | Nagamani | |
| 2019 | N.T.R: Kathanayakudu | Jaya | |
| 2019 | F2 - Fun & Frustration | Padmavathi | |
| 2019 | 118 | Esther | |
| 2019 | Hippi | Maid | |
| 2019 | Raju Gari Gadhi 3 | Colony member | |
| 2019 | Prati Roju Pandage | Geetha | |
| 2020 | Sarileru Neekevvaru | Swechcha | |
| 2020 | HIT: The First Case | Sheela | |
| 2020 | 47 Days | Yoga instructor | |
| 2021 | Alludu Adhurs | Rattalu | |
| 2021 | Zombie Reddy | Talambari | |
| 2022 | Ghani | Madhuri's maid | |
| 2023 | Mama Mascheendra | Bhanu's wife and Parasuram's half-sister | |
| 2023 | Extra Ordinary Man | Sam | |
| 2023 | Devil: The British Secret Agent | Servant | |
| 2024 | Aa Okkati Adakku | Divya | |
| 2024 | Devara: Part 1 | Thangam's friend | |
| 2024 | Bachchala Malli | Rajyam | |
| 2025 | Thammudu | Tejamma | |
