= Gangavva =

Indian YouTuber

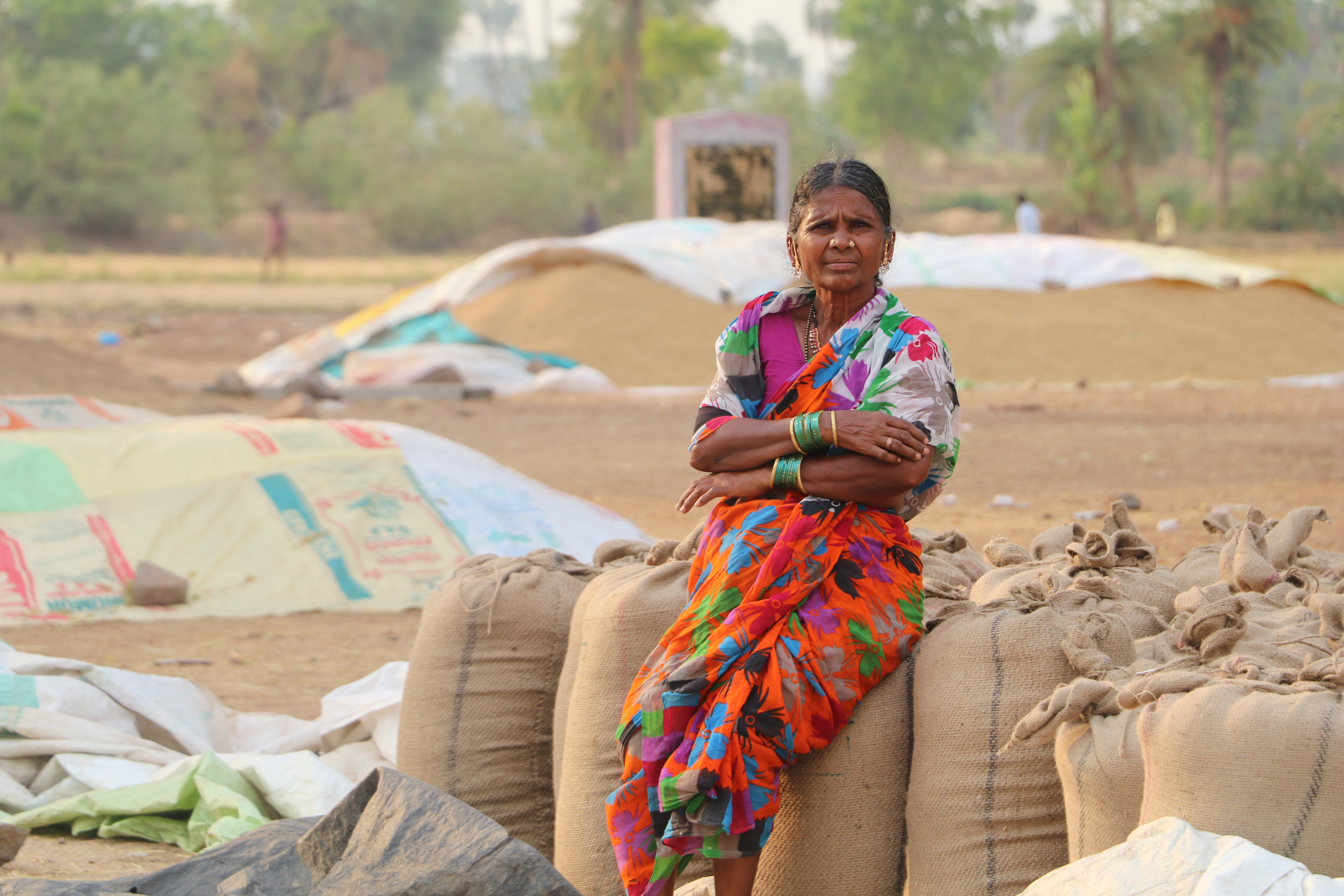
- Gangavva in 2019
- Born: Milkuri Gangavva; 1961 or 1962 (age 64–65); Polasa, Andhra Pradesh (now in Telangana), India
- Occupations: YouTuber; Comedian; Actress

YouTube information
- Channel: My Village Show
- Genres: Comedy; vlogs; entertainment
- Subscribers: 3.14 million
- Views: 1.08 billion
- Last updated: 10 January 2026

Milkuri Gangavva is an Indian YouTuber, comedian and actress. She used to work as a farm-worker before becoming popular on YouTube. Gangavva is known for her diction of Telangana dialect of Telugu language. In 2020, she entered the Telugu reality TV show Bigg Boss 4 as one of the 19 contestants.

== Early life ==
Gangavva hails from Lambadipally village of Telangana state's Jagitial district. No record exists of her birth date. Gangavva received no formal education as she dropped out during her first grade. She was married off when she was five. Gangavva had four children, three daughters and a son, including a daughter who died.

== Career ==
Gangavva used to work in agriculture fields and rolled cigarettes before venturing into YouTube in 2016. She was approached by son-in-law Srikanth Sriram to feature in his channel My Village Show which focuses village culture and rural life of Telangana. She started off with guest appearances before acting full-time from 2017. Gangavva's comedic roles in the series gained her wide recognition.

Gangavva's unique diction of Telangana's dialect made her popular among the Telugu people. In 2019, Gangavva made her Telugu cinema debut with Mallesham and later that year she also appeared in iSmart Shankar.

In 2020, on the occasion of International Women's Day, Gangavva received Women Achiever Award from Tamilisai Soundararajan, Governor of Telangana.

== Filmography ==
=== Films ===
Key
†	Denotes films that have not yet been released

Year	Title	Role	Ref.
2019	Mallesham	Home owner	
2019	iSmart Shankar		
2021	SR Kalyanamandapam	Neighbour	
2021	Raja Raja Chora	Anjamma	
2021	Love Story	Gangavva	
2022	Godfather	Kanthamma	
2022	First Day First Show	Gangavva	
2023	Intinti Ramayanam		
2024	Kismat	Saravva	
2024	Swag		
2025	Game Changer	Villager	
2025	Takita Tadimi Tandana		

=== Television ===
Year	Title	Role	Network	Ref.
2020	Sixth Sense	Contestant	Star Maa	Season 3
2020	Bigg Boss 4	Contestant	Star Maa	
2021	Sixth Sense	Contestant	Star Maa	Season 4
2023–present	Save the Tigers	Poshavva	Disney+ Hotstar	
2024	Bigg Boss 8	Contestant	Star Maa	
