= Navdeep =

Indian actor

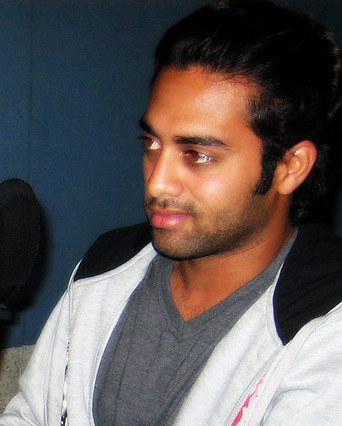
- Navdeep in 2010
- Born: Navdeep Pallapolu; 26 January 1986 (age 40); Hyderabad, Andhra Pradesh, India (present-day Telangana)
- Occupations: Actor; television personality
- Years active: 2004–present

Navdeep Pallapolu (born 26 January 1986) is an Indian actor and television personality who predominantly appears in Telugu films. He made his film debut in 2004 with the patriotic sports drama Jai. His notable works include Arinthum Ariyamalum (2005), Gowtam SSC (2005), Chandamama (2007), Arya 2 (2009), Ice Cream (2014), and Dhandoraa (2025).

Navdeep is prominent in the television industry, finishing as a finalist in the first season of reality TV show Bigg Boss. He hosted the game shows Super and Tollywood Squares and was a judge on the comedy show Adhirindi.

== Career ==
=== Films ===
Navdeep's first film appearance was in the 2004 Telugu romantic film, Jai, in which he played an Indian boxer fighting Laskar-E-Taiba terrorists. The movie was a success. In the 2005 Tamil film Arinthum Ariyamalum, he portrayed a hero who is the son of the don, Prakash Raj, who was estranged from his father. His following films were Largely overlooked and unsuccessful at the box office.

His biggest break was the 2007 film Chandamama, where he starred along with Kajal Aggarwal, in which his performance as a flirty and naughty youth won praise. The film was one of the biggest blockbusters of 2007, and Navdeep and Kajal won accolades. He later essayed a lead role in Arya 2 opposite Kajal once again and Allu Arjun, and he received praise for his character with grey shades. Despite it being a multi starrer with Allu Arjun, Navdeep made his presence felt in this box office hit.

From 2010 till 2013, he continued to star in diverse films, which include Om Shanti opposite Aditi Sharma, Kajal Aggarwal, and Nikhil Siddharth, the mystery thriller Yagam, slapstick comedy Mugguru, romantic drama Aakasame Haddu, a cameo in Oh My Friend, and the thriller Mythri, none of which made a mark at the box office.

In 2013, Navdeep played the antagonist opposite Jr. NTR in Baadshah, and the film was a blockbuster. Later that year, he starred in masala flick Vasool Raja, in which Srihari played an important role. That movie failed at the box office. That same year, he had given his voice to an HIV/AIDS education animated software tutorial created by the nonprofit organization TeachAids. In 2014, his crime comedy Bangaru Kodipetta was an average venture, in which he starred opposite Swathi Reddy, and then he played the male lead in the supernatural horror flick Ice Cream, which was a hit at the box office. He also hosted the "3rd South Indian International Movie Awards" that year. He played a cameo role in Anukshanam and his next film Poga flopped. In 2015, he starred in another crime drama Bham Bolenath, which flopped miserably, and played a cameo in Tamil movie Idhu Enna Maayam.

In 2016, Navdeep hosted the 1st IIFA Utsavam Awards with Allu Sirish and Regina Cassandra. He also made a cameo appearance in the Hindi flick Azhar and played an important supporting character in Ram Charan's blockbuster movie Dhruva. He later played a crucial role in Nene Raju Nene Mantri in 2017, which also starred Rana Daggubati. He finished as in 4th place on the reality TV show Bigg Boss Telugu in 2017. In 2018 he starred in Gangstars, a crime drama web series alongside Jagapati Babu and Swetha Basu Prasad. The series was promoted heavily like a film and got a positive reception. After nearly 3 years in 2018, following the new success of Gangstars, he starred as a hero once again in romantic comedy Next Enti, opposite Tamannaah and Sundeep Kishan. This film unfortunately failed at the box office. In 2020, he played a supporting role in blockbuster action comedy Ala Vaikunthapurramloo, which stars Allu Arjun and Pooja Hegde. In the same year, Navdeep starred as the main lead in psychological thriller Run, which was panned by critics.

=== Television ===
Navdeep has hosted the Fear Factor adaptation in Telugu, Super, along with a few film festivals. His most notable appearance in Television was as a wildcard contestant in popular reality TV show Bigg Boss Telugu, in which he gained large praise and exposure due to his charm and wit. He finished in 4th place. He then appeared in Yupp TV's rom-com Mana Mugguri Love Story, in which he played a wealthy, successful, and suave young businessman. The show also starred Tejaswi Madivada and Adith Arun in lead roles, and was received well. In 2018, he started hosting his own game show Tollywood Squares on Star Maa, and many celebrities came to participate. The show had 26 episodes in the first season.

== Filmography ==
Year	Title	Role	Language	Notes
2004	Jai	K. Jairam	Telugu	
2005	Manasu Maata Vinadhu	Venu	Telugu	
2005	Arinthum Ariyamalum	Sathya	Tamil	
2005	Modati Cinema	Sreeram	Telugu	
2005	Goutham SSC	Goutham	Telugu	
2006	Premante Inte	Veeru	Telugu	
2006	Seethakoka Chiluka	Cheenu	Telugu	
2006	Nenjil	Anand	Tamil	
2007	Poramboku	Karthik	Telugu	
2007	Chandamama	Kishore	Telugu	
2008	Ready	Swapna's Boyfriend	Telugu	Guest appearance
2008	Keka	Dubbing artist for Raja	Telugu	Voice role
2008	Aegan	Narain	Tamil	
2009	A Aa E Ee	Akash	Tamil	
2009	Ride		Telugu	Cameo appearance
2009	Solla Solla Inikkum	Sathya	Tamil	
2009	Arya 2	Ajay	Telugu	
2010	Om Shanti	Anand	Telugu	
2010	Yagam	Santosh	Telugu	
2011	Mugguru	Pavan	Telugu	
2011	Aakasame Haddu	Karthik	Telugu	
2011	Oh My Friend	Uday	Telugu	
2012	Mythri	Deepu	Telugu	
2013	Baadshah	Aadi IPS	Telugu	
2013	Vasool Raja	Raja	Telugu	
2014	Bangaru Kodipetta	Vamsi	Telugu	
2014	Ice Cream	Vishal	Telugu	
2014	Anukshanam	Ajit	Telugu	Cameo appearance
2014	Poga	Shiva	Telugu	
2015	Bham Bolenath	Vivek	Telugu	
2015	Dongaata	Himself	Telugu	Special appearance in "Break Up Antu"
2015	Idhu Enna Maayam	Santosh	Tamil	Cameo appearance
2016	Azhar	Meera's boyfriend	Hindi	Cameo appearance
2016	Dhruva	Gowtham IPS	Telugu	
2017	Nene Raju Nene Mantri	Siva	Telugu	
2018	Next Enti	Krish	Telugu	
2020	Ala Vaikunthapurramloo	Shekhar	Telugu	
2020	Seeru	Ashok Mithran	Tamil	
2020	Run	Sandeep Reddy	Telugu	
2021	Mosagallu	Vijay	Telugu	
2024	Eagle	Jai	Telugu	
2024	Operation Valentine	Wing Commander Kabir	Telugu; Hindi	Cameo appearance
2024	Love Mouli	Mouli	Telugu	
2024	Yevam	—N/a	Telugu	Producer
2025	Dhandoraa	Sarpanch	Telugu	
2027	Purushan	TBA	Tamil	

== Television ==
Year	Title	Role	Network	Notes
2011–2016	Super	Host	ETV	2 seasons
2017	Bigg Boss 1	Contestant	Star Maa	Finalist
2017	Mana Mugguri Love Story	Surya	Yupp TV	
2018	Tollywood Squares	Host	Star Maa	
2018	Gangstars	Vishwa	Amazon Prime Video	
2019–2020	Ragini MMS: Returns 2	Rajeev	ZEE5	Hindi series
2020	Adhirindi	Judge	Zee Telugu	
2020	Masti's	Pranav	aha	
2021	Ramyug	Vibheeshana	MX Player	
2023	Newsense	Shiva	aha	
2023	Maya Bazaar For Sale	Abhijeet	ZEE5	
2025	Touch Me Not	Raghav	JioHotstar	

== Drug case ==
On October 11, 2023, Navdeep was questioned by the Enforcement Directorate (ED) for over eight hours in connection with a drug case. The ED recorded his statement as part of an ongoing investigation. The Telangana State Anti-Narcotics Bureau had previously interrogated Navdeep in relation to a case involving alleged contact with Nigerian drug peddlers. He had been granted anticipatory bail by the Telangana high court but was served a notice under Section 41A of the CrPC. The ED is investigating the money laundering angle in a 2017 drug scandal based on chargesheets filed by the excise department in multiple drug cases. Several other Tollywood actors, including Rakul Preet Singh, Rana Daggubati, Ravi Teja, Charmee Kaur, Mumaith Khan, Tanish, Nandu, and Tarun have also been questioned by the ED in connection with this case, which primarily revolves around key accused Calvin Mascarenhas and others involved in the drug trade.
