= Aadarsh Balakrishna =

Indian film actor

- Born: Bangalore, Karnataka, India
- Other names: Addy, Aadhi
- Occupation: Film Actor
- Spouse: Gulnar Virishna
- Relatives: Balakrishna (father); Prashanth Neel (cousin)

Aadarsh Balakrishna is an Indian actor, primarily known for his negative roles in Telugu films. He is also the runner-up of Telugu reality TV show Bigg Boss 1.

== Early life ==
Aadarsh was born on 10 February 1984 in Bangalore. His father, Balakrishna, is a businessman while his mother Uma is a homemaker. He has a younger sister, Apoorva, who is an architect. Aadarsh studied at Sophia High School, Bangalore until 3rd standard. His family then moved to Hyderabad, where he continued his schooling at Bharatiya Vidya Bhavan Public School and St. Andrews High School. He completed his graduation from Nizam College in 2005–06, majoring in commerce. He was a cricketer and nurtured an ambition to play for India. He represented Hyderabad in various state-level categories and also played for Osmania University.

Kannada film director Prashanth Neel, Sriimurali’s wife, Vidya, and Naresh's second wife, Ramya Raghupathi, are his cousins.

== Career ==
Aadarsh Balakrishna initially aspired to become a cricketer and played at the state level during his teenage years. While training at St. John's Cricket Academy, he was discovered by Nagesh Kukunoor's team, who were searching for a real cricketer to play the role of 'Kamal' in the film Iqbal opposite Shreyas Talpade. After auditioning, he was cast in the role. Iqbal became a critical and commercial success and won a National Award in 2005, produced by Subhash Ghai's Mukta Searchlight Films.

Balakrishna's significant break in Telugu films came with the film Happy Days (2007), directed by Sekhar Kammula. He portrayed Sanjay, a senior bully in an engineering college setting, a role that established his presence as a 'bad guy' in Telugu cinema. He continued to build his career with successful films like Vinayakudu (2008), directed by Sai Kiran Avidi, and Ride (2009), directed by Ramesh Varma.

Balakrishna has worked with notable directors such as Nagesh Kukunoor, Sekhar Kammula, Gopichand Mallineni, and Ram Gopal Varma. He made his Kannada film debut in Nooru Janmaku, directed by national award-winning director Nagathihalli Chandrashekhar, where he played the second lead. Additionally, he appeared in Govindudu Andarivadele, directed by Krishna Vamsi and Ram Charan.

Apart from his acting career, Balakrishna represents the Telugu Warriors in the Celebrity Cricket League and is considered one of their key players. He gained further recognition as the runner-up in the grand finale of Bigg Boss Telugu Season 1.

Balakrishna is set to play the role of an Indian Research and Analysis Wing agent in Ullu App's upcoming web series Peshawar, based on the 2014 Peshawar school massacre. His character is loosely based on the real-life hero known as 'Black Tiger'.

== Filmography ==
=== Film ===
- Note: All films are in Telugu, unless otherwise noted.

List of films and roles
Year	Title	Role	Notes
2005	Iqbal	Kamal	Hindi Film
2007	Happy Days	Sanjay	
2008	Vinayakudu	Ananth Naidu	
2009	Ride	Gaja	
2009	Evaraina Epudaina	Raja	
2010	Maro Charitra	Maddy	
2010	Maa Annayya Bangaram		
2010	Nooru Janmaku	Jeevan	Kannada Film
2010	KSD Appalaraju	Babu Garu	
2011	Cricket Girls and Beer	Vijay	
2012	Genius	Nizamuddin	
2012	Bodyguard		
2014	Nee Jathaga Nenundali		
2014	Govindudu Andarivadele	Baachi	
2015	Superstar Kidnap	Jai	
2016	Seethamma Andalu Ramayya Sitralu	Seetha's suitor	
2016	Sarrainodu	Paddam Veerendra	
2016	Jaguar	Arya	Bilingual; Kannada-Telugu Film
2017	Babu Baga Busy	Chax	
2017	Winner		
2017	PSV Garuda Vega		
2018	Vijetha	Kiran	
2018	Neevevaro	Blind sculptor	
2018	W/O Ram	Rocky	
2018	Aravinda Sametha Veera Raghava	Basi Reddy's henchman	
2019	Chanakya	RAW agent	
2019	Ranarangam	Seshu	
2020	Aswathama	Jagadish	
2020	V	Sharath	
2020	Colour Photo	Chandu	
2021	Thank You Brother	Surya	
2021	Thimmarusu: Assignment Vali		
2021	Anubhavinchu Raja		
2022	Atithi Devo Bhava		
2023	Ranga Maarthaanda	Ranga Rao	
2023	Shaakuntalam		
2024	Mix Up	Sahoo	
2025	Thalli Manasu	Charan	
2026	Euphoria		

=== Television ===
List of television shows and roles
Year	Show	Role	Network	Language	Result
2017	Bigg Boss 1	Contestant	Star Maa	Telugu	Runner up - on day 70
2020	Avrodh	Army Personnel	SonyLIV	Hindi	
2022–2023	Jhansi	Sankeeth	Disney+ Hotstar	Telugu	
2024	The Mystery of Moksha Island	Rohit/Dinesh	Disney+ Hotstar	Telugu	
