= Manasichi Choodu =

Manasichi Choodu may refer to:

- Manasichi Choodu (film)
- Manasichi Choodu (TV series)
