= Bigg Boss (Telugu TV series) season 7 =

Reality TV game show, Telugu language

Bigg Boss
- Season 7
- Season 7 eye logo
- Presented by: Nagarjuna
- No. of days: 105
- No. of housemates: 19
- Winner: Pallavi Prashanth
- Runner-up: Amardeep Chowdary
- No. of episodes: 106

Release
- Original network: Star Maa; Disney+ Hotstar
- Original release: 3 September – 17 December 2023

Season chronology
- ← Previous; Season 6 Next → Season 8

Bigg Boss 7 also known as Bigg Boss 7: Ulta Pulta, is a reality show and the seventh season of the Indian Telugu-language reality television series Bigg Boss produced by Endemol Shine India (now merged with Banijay). The show premiered on 3 September 2023, on Star Maa and Disney+ Hotstar, with Nagarjuna returning as a host for the fifth time in a row.

The season's finale took place on 17 December 2023 with Pallavi Prashanth winning the title along with ₹50 lakh prize money, 15 lakh worth diamond jewelry and a luxurious car, while Amardeep Chowdary emerged as the first runner-up.

== Production ==
=== Eye Logo ===
On 10 July 2023, the makers unveiled the title logo. Coming on the logo, the seventh number has been placed between the English Bigg Boss words to represent the seventh season. Moreover, the eye symbol which is the trade mark of this show is also present in this logo. Neon logo of Bigg Boss 7 takes center stage, casting a luminous glow that engulfs your screen. The vibrant blend of blue and red emanates a pulsating energy, embodying the essence of excitement and passion. Its sleek design adds an international touch, promising an entertainment experience like no other.

=== Teasers ===
On 18 July 2023, the show makers released a promo with host Akkineni Nagarjuna and next promo teased the unique "Ulta-Pulta" tagline referring to the uniqueness that this season is about to have and also said that this season will be different and against audience expectations and imaginations.

=== Concept ===
The concept for this season of Bigg Boss was "Ulta-Pulta", which meant everything would be opposite from the previous seasons.

=== 24x7 streaming ===
The show is streamed 24/7 on Disney+ Hotstar and an hour-long episode every day on Star Maa. The episodes are being shown on a 24-hour live stream, from Monday to Friday.

=== Voting process ===
One vote can be made through Disney+Hostar app (per account) and missed call (per mobile number) unlike earlier where users were allowed to make 10 votes per Disney+Hostar account and per phone number.

== Housemates status ==
| S.no. | Housemate | Day entered | Day exited | Status | Ref. |
|---|---|---|---|---|---|
| 1 | Prashanth | Day 1 | Day 105 | Winner | |
| 2 | Amardeep | Day 1 | Day 105 | 1st Runner-up | |
| 3 | Sivaji | Day 1 | Day 105 | 2nd Runner-up | |
| 4 | Yawar | Day 1 | Day 105 | 3rd Runner-up, Walked | |
| 5 | Priyanka | Day 1 | Day 105 | 4th Runner-up | |
| 6 | Arjun | Day 35 | Day 105 | 5th Runner-up | |
| 7 | Shobha | Day 1 | Day 98 | Evicted | |
| 8 | Gautham | Day 1 | Day 91 | Evicted | |
| 9 | Rathika | Day 1 | Day 28 | Evicted | |
| 9 | Rathika | Day 49 | Day 84 | Evicted | |
| 10 | Ashwini | Day 35 | Day 83 | Evicted | |
| 11 | Bhole | Day 35 | Day 70 | Evicted | |
| 12 | Teja | Day 1 | Day 63 | Evicted | |
| 13 | Sandeep | Day 1 | Day 56 | Evicted | |
| 14 | Pooja | Day 35 | Day 49 | Evicted | |
| 15 | Nayani | Day 35 | Day 42 | Evicted | |
| 16 | Subhasree | Day 1 | Day 35 | Evicted | |
| 17 | Damini | Day 1 | Day 21 | Evicted | |
| 18 | Shakeela | Day 1 | Day 14 | Evicted | |
| 19 | Kiran | Day 1 | Day 7 | Evicted | |

== Housemates ==
The participants in the order of appearance and entered to the house are:

=== Original entrants ===
- Priyanka Jain – Television actress. She is known for her performances in the TV shows Mouna Raagam and Janaki Kalaganaledu etc.
- Sivaji – Film actor and politician.
- Damini Bhatla – Singer. Her notable works include "Paccha Bottasi" (from Baahubali: The Beginning) and "Blast Baby" (from Godfather).
- Prince Yawar – Model and television actor.
- Subhashree Rayaguru – Actress and lawyer.
- Shakeela – Former actress and politician. She has featured in over 250 films and is also the member of the Indian National Congress
- Sandeep – Dance choreographer.
- Shobha Shetty – Television actress. She is best known for her portrayal of Dr. Monitha in Karthika Deepam.
- Tasty Teja – YouTuber and comedian. He is known for his food vlogs on YouTube. Teja has also appeared in the TV show Jabardasth
- Rathika Rose – Actress and internet celebrity.
- Gautham Krishna – Actor and doctor. He is known for his leading role in the film Aakasa Veedhullo.
- Kiran Rathod – Actress. Her notable works include Andaru Dongale Dorikite and Kevvu Keka.
- Pallavi Prashanth – Farmer and YouTuber.
- Amardeep Chowdary – Television actor. He is best known for his role in Siri Siri Muvvalu, Janaki Kalaganaledu, and many movies.

=== Wild card entrants in 2.0 launch ===
- Ambati Arjun – Film and television actor. He is best known for his role in Agnisakshi and Devatha serials.
- Aswini Shree – Actress and Internet celebrity.
- Bhole Shavali – Music director, writer and playback singer. He is known for his work for using words like "Yamaho Yama," "Banthi Poola Janaki," and "Dhanalaxmi Thalupu Thadithe" etc. in his songs for the hatke vibes.
- Pooja Murthy – Television actress. She is known for her performance in the TV show Gundamma Katha.
- Nayani Pavani - Social media influencer, internet celebrity and a dancer.

== Twists ==
=== Money offer ===
For the first time in the show's history, the first five contestants who had entered the house were allowed to walk out of the show after taking the money briefcase. The host offers from 5 Lakhs to 20 Lakhs for the first five contestants Priyanka, Sivaji, Damini, Yawar, Subhashree, and later increased to 35 Lakhs. However, All five contestants have not accepted the offer and expressed their determination to remain in the house and ready to face the challenges.

=== Power astra ===
In week 1-4, contestants had to compete in tasks to win the Power Astra. The winner of Power Astra will become confirmed housemate and get immunity from nomination.

| | Week 1 | Week 2 | Week 3 | Week 4 |
|---|---|---|---|---|
| Power Astra Contenders | Priyanka; ~~Rathika~~; Sandeep; ~~Sivaji~~ | Amardeep; Shakeela; Sivaji | ~~Yawar~~; Priyanka; Shobha | Yawar; Subhasree; Prashanth |
| Power Astra Winner | Sandeep | Sivaji | Shobha | Prashanth |

=== Bedroom allotment ===
This season's house had three bedrooms: VIP Bedroom, Deluxe Bedroom and Standard Bedroom with different comforts and privileges.
Key:

indicates VIP Room
indicates Deluxe Room
indicates Standard Room
indicates Secret Room
indicates the Power Astra Winner.
indicates the House Captain.
indicates the Guest.

| | Week 1 | Week 2 | Week 3 | Week 4 | Week 5 | Week 6 | Week 7 | Week 8 | Week 9 | Week 10 | Week 11 | Week 12 | Week 13 | Week 14 | Week 15 |
|---|---|---|---|---|---|---|---|---|---|---|---|---|---|---|---|
| Allotment by | Vijay Deverakonda | Sandeep | Sandeep; Sivaji | | Sandeep; Shobha; Prashanth | Bhole; Pooja; Nayani | Yawar | Arjun | Gautham | Shobha | Sivaji | Priyanka | None | Amardeep | None |
| Prashanth | Not Assigned | Standard | | | VIP | | Deluxe | Standard | Deluxe | Standard | VIP | Standard | | Deluxe | |
| Amardeep | Not Assigned | Deluxe | | | | Standard | | Deluxe | Standard | VIP | Deluxe | VIP | Standard | VIP | |
| Sivaji | Not Assigned | Deluxe | VIP | | Deluxe | VIP | | Deluxe | | | VIP | Deluxe | | VIP | Deluxe |
| Yawar | Not Assigned | Standard | | | | | VIP | Standard | | | VIP | Standard | Deluxe | | |
| Priyanka | Not Assigned | Standard | | | | | | | | VIP | Standard | VIP | Standard | | VIP |
| Arjun | | | | | | Deluxe | | VIP | Deluxe | Standard | Deluxe | | | VIP | |
| Shobha | Not Assigned | Standard | | VIP | | Standard | | | VIP | | Standard | VIP | Standard | | |
| Gautham | Not Assigned | Standard | | | | Secret | Deluxe | VIP | | Standard | | | Deluxe | | |
| Rathika | Not Assigned | Standard | | | | | | Standard | VIP | Standard | | | | | |
| Ashwini | | | | | | Deluxe | | Standard | Deluxe | | | | | | |
| Bhole | | | | | | Deluxe | Standard | Deluxe | | | | | | | |
| Teja | Not Assigned | | Deluxe | | | Standard | Deluxe | VIP | Standard | | | | | | |
| Sandeep | Standard | VIP | | | | Standard | VIP | Deluxe | | | | | | | |
| Pooja | | | | | | Deluxe | Standard | | | | | | | | |
| Nayani | | | | | | Deluxe | | | | | | | | | |
| Subhashree | Deluxe | | | | | | | | | | | | | | |
| Damini | Not Assigned | Deluxe | | | | | | | | | | | | | |
| Shakeela | Not Assigned | Deluxe | | | | | | | | | | | | | |
| Kiran | Not Assigned | | | | | | | | | | | | | | |

=== Bigg Boss 2.0 launch ===
On Day 35, Bigg Boss 2.0 was launched with five wild card entrant's, Arjun, Ashwini, Bhole, Pooja and Nayani entered into the house. The episode started with a bang by eliminating Subhashree by audience voting. After her elimination, Gautham was also announced eliminated by the decision of the housemates but later host sent him to the secret room until further orders from Bigg Boss. At the end, Host Nagarjuna confirmed that all the contestants are now considered as confirmed Housemates.

=== Special powers HOL, HOB and HOK ===
During Bigg Boss 2.0 launch, Host gave a special power called HOL (Heads of Luggages) to first two wild card entrant's Arjun and Ashwini. After attaining this power, these two need to decide the luggage allocation to the remaining housemates of the house. The next three wild card entrant's Bhole, Pooja and Nayani were given a power called HOB (Heads of Beds). These three contestants need to give a unanimous decision of allocating beds to the housemates. Gautam was given a power called HOK (Head of Kitchen), he had to take care of the ration management. These three powers ended at the end of Week 6.

=== Mutual funds ===
Housemates had the earn coins when win Captaincy. These coins can be used to redeem special powers or luxuries. By the end of the season, the housemate with the most coins will win a special gift.

| | Week 5 | Week 6 | Week 7 | Week 8 | Week 9 | Week 10 | Week 11 | Week 12 | Week 13 | Week 14 | Week 15 |
|---|---|---|---|---|---|---|---|---|---|---|---|
| Amardeep | | | | 100🪙 | | | | | | 300🪙 | |
| Arjun | | | 100🪙 | | | | | | 200🪙 | | |
| Prashanth | 100🪙 | 200🪙 | | | | | | | | | |
| Priyanka | | | | | | | 100🪙 | | | | |
| Sivaji | | | | | | 100🪙 | | | | | |
| Yawar | | 100🪙 | | | | | | | | | |
| Shobha | 100🪙 | | | | 200🪙 | | | | | Coins transferred to Amardeep | |
| Gautham | | | | 100🪙 | | | | | Coins transferred to Arjun | | |
| Sandeep | 100🪙 | | | Coins transferred to Amardeep | | | | | | | |

Note:
- Housemates not listed above didn't receive any coins.
- When housemate with coins gets Evicted, they had to hand over their coins to a fellow housemate of their choice.

== Guest appearances ==
| Week | Day | Guest(s) | Purpose of Visit | Ref. |
|---|---|---|---|---|
| Week 1 | Launch Day | Vijay Devarakonda | To promote his film Kushi. | |
| Week 1 | Launch Day | Naveen Polishetty | To promote his film Miss Shetty Mr Polishetty. | |
| Week 3 | Day 21 | Ram Pothineni | To promote his film Skanda. | |
| Week 5 | Day 35 | Siddharth | To promote his film Chinna. | |
| Week 5 | Day 35 | Ravi Teja, Nupur Sanon and Gayatri Bhardwaj | To promote their film Tiger Nageswara Rao. | |
| Week 6 | Day 42 | Anil Ravipudi and Sreeleela | To promote their film Bhagavanth Kesari. | |
| Week 7 | Day 46 | Ohmkar, Varalaxmi Sarathkumar, Nandu and Avika Gor | To promote their web series Mansion 24. | |
| Week 7 | Day 49 | Vagdevi, Lalasa and Sirisha | Performed singing as a part of Dusshera special episode. | |
| Week 7 | Day 49 | Dimple Hayathi, Reba Monica John and Payal Rajput | Dance performance as part of Dusshera special episode. | |
| Week 9 | Day 62 | Karthi | To promote his film Japan. | |
| Week 9 | Day 63 | Raghava Lawrence and S. J. Suryah | To promote their film Jigarthanda DoubleX. | |
| Week 9 | Day 63 | Eesha Rebba | Entered into the house for the promotional campaign of Whisper. | |
| Week 10 | Day 65 | Kenny (Sivaji's Son) | Entered the house as a part of "BB College" Task Guest. | |
| Week 10 | Day 65 | Surekha Reddy (Arjun's Wife) | Entered the house as a part of "BB College" Task Guest. | |
| Week 10 | Day 65 | Rama (Ashwini's Mother) | Entered the house as a part of "BB College" Task Guest. | |
| Week 10 | Day 66 | Manga (Gautham's Mother) | Entered the house as a part of "BB College" Task Guest. | |
| Week 10 | Day 66 | Shiva Kumar (Priyanka's Fiancee) | Entered the house as a part of "BB College" Task Guest. | |
| Week 10 | Day 66 | Seema (Bhole's Wife) | Entered the house as a part of "BB College" Task Guest. | |
| Week 10 | Day 67 | Tejaswini Gowda (Amardeep's Wife) | Entered the house as a part of "BB College" Task Guest. | |
| Week 10 | Day 67 | Ratamma (Shobha's Mother) | Entered the house as a part of "BB College" Task Guest. | |
| Week 10 | Day 67 | Shuja Ahmed (Yawar's Brother) | Entered the house as a part of "BB College" Task Guest. | |
| Week 10 | Day 68 | Ramulu (Rathika's Father) | Entered the house as a part of "BB College" Task Guest. | |
| Week 10 | Day 68 | Satyanarayana (Prashanth's Father) | Entered the house as a part of "BB College" Task Guest. | |
| Week 10 | Day 70 | Vaishnav Tej and Sreeleela | To promote their film Aadikeshava. | |
| Week 10 | Day 70 | Ritika Singh and Faria Abdullah | Dance Performance as part of Diwali special episode. | |
| Week 10 | Day 70 | Kajal Agarwal | To promote her film Satyabhama. | |
| Week 11 | Day 77 | Srikanth, Varalaxmi Sarathkumar, Rahul Vijay and Shivani Rajashekar | To promote their film Kotabommali P.S | |
| Week 13 | Day 91 | Ashika Ranganath | Unveiled the glimpse of Naa Saami Ranga film. | |
| Week 13 | Day 91 | Nani | To promote his film Hi Nanna. | |
| Week 14 | Day 98 | M. M. Keeravani | Unveiled the first single of Naa Saami Ranga film. | |

== Nomination table ==
| First Level | Week 1 | Week 2 | Week 3 | Week 4 | Week 5 | | | Second Level | Week 6 | | Week 7 | Week 8 | Week 9 | Week 10 | Week 11 | Week 12 | Week 13 | Week 14 | Week 15 | | |
| First Level | Week 1 | Week 2 | Week 3 | Week 4 | Day 29 | Day 35 | | Second Level | Day 36 | Day 42 | Week 7 | Week 8 | Week 9 | Week 10 | Week 11 | Week 12 | Week 13 | Day 92 | | Day 105 | |
|---|---|---|---|---|---|---|---|---|---|---|---|---|---|---|---|---|---|---|---|---|---|
| Nominees for Power Astra | None | Priyanka; ~~Rathika~~; Sandeep; ~~Sivaji~~ | Amardeep; Shakeela; Sivaji | Shobha; Priyanka; ~~Yawar~~ | Subhasree; Prashanth; Yawar | None | | Nominees for Captaincy | Gautham; Prashanth; Sandeep; Teja | Amardeep; Prashanth; Priyanka; Sandeep; Shobha; Sivaji; Teja; Yawar | | Arjun; Ashwini; Prashanth; Priyanka; Sandeep; Sivaji | Gautham; Prashanth; Priyanka; Sandeep; Shobha | Arjun; Gautham; Rathika; Shobha; Teja; ~~Yawar~~ | Arjun; Sivaji | Amardeep; Arjun; Prashanth; Priyanka | Amardeep; Arjun; Ashwini; Gautham; Prashanth; Priyanka; Rathika; Shobha; Sivaji; Yawar | None | No; Captain | | |
| Power Astra Winner | None | Sandeep | Sivaji | Shobha | Prashanth | None | | House Captain | Prashanth | Yawar | | Arjun | Gautham | Shobha | Sivaji | Priyanka | Captaincy Cancelled | Amardeep | No; Captain | | |
| Power Astra's Nomination | None | Yawar | Teja (to save); Amardeep (to evict) | Gautham; Priyanka; Rathika; Subhashree; Teja; Yawar | Not eligible | None | | House Captain's Nomination | Nayani; Amardeep | Gautham; Amardeep | | Teja; Bhole | Amardeep; Rathika | Bhole; Gautham; Sivaji; Yawar; Rathika | Gautham; Priyanka | Yawar; Sivaji | Captaincy Cancelled | Prashanth; Yawar | No; Captain | | |
| Power Astra's Nomination | None | Yawar | Teja (to save); Amardeep (to evict) | Gautham; Priyanka; Rathika; Subhashree; Teja; Yawar | Not eligible | None | | Deputy Captain(s) | None | | Sivaji; Sandeep | Gautham; Teja | Shobha; Rathika | Amardeep; Priyanka | Prashanth; Yawar | Amardeep; Shobha | Captaincy Cancelled | Arjun; Sivaji | No; Captain | | |
| Vote to: | Evict | | | Task | Evict | | 2.0 Launch | Vote to: | Evict | | | | | Task | Evict | | | WIN | | | |
| Prashanth | Shakeela; Kiran | Teja; Gautham | Teja; Damini | ~~Amardeep~~; Gautham | Power Astra; Winner | Gautham | Moved to Second Level | Prashanth | House; Captain | Sandeep; Teja | | Gautham; Amardeep | Amardeep; Teja | Gautham | Arjun; Rathika | Gautham; Rathika | Shobha; Priyanka | Amardeep; Shobha | Finalist | Winner (Day 105) | |
| Amardeep | Yawar; Teja | Sivaji; Prashanth | Gautham; Subhashree | ~~Prashanth~~; Subhashree | Subhashree; Sivaji | Gautham | Moved to Second Level | Amardeep | Ashwini; Yawar | Bhole; Ashwini | | Sivaji; Bhole | Bhole; Arjun | Bhole | Gautham; Yawar | Yawar; Rathika | Prashanth; Gautham | House; Captain | Finalist | 1st Runner-up (Day 105) | |
| Sivaji | Gautham; Damini | Shobha; Amardeep | Power Astra; Winner | Gautham; Priyanka; Rathika; Subhashree; Teja; Yawar | Amardeep; Priyanka | Gautham | Moved to Second Level | Sivaji | Amardeep; Pooja | Gautham; Amardeep | | Shobha; Priyanka | Amardeep; Teja | ~~Amardeep~~ | House; Captain | Gautham; Arjun | Arjun; Gautham | Priyanka; Amardeep | Finalist | 2nd Runner-up (Day 105) | |
| Yawar | Shakeela; Gautham | Shakeela; Amardeep | Priyanka; Damini | Priyanka; ~~Teja~~ | Amardeep; Priyanka | Gautham | Moved to Second Level | Yawar | Shobha; Pooja | House; Captain | | Shobha; Sandeep | Shobha; Ashwini | ~~Amardeep~~; Yawar | Shobha; Amardeep | Amardeep; Arjun | Gautham; Priyanka | Shobha; Priyanka | Finalist | 3rd Runner-up, Walked (Day 105) | |
| Priyanka | Prashanth; Rathika | Sivaji; Prashanth | Yawar; Gautham | Nominated | Sivaji; Yawar | Gautham | Moved to Second Level | Priyanka | Teja; Ashwini | Ashwini; Bhole | | Bhole; Ashwini | Rathika; Bhole | Bhole; Gautham; Sivaji; Yawar; Rathika | Rathika; Ashwini | House; Captain | Sivaji; Prashanth | Amardeep; Yawar | Finalist | 4th Runner-up (Day 105) | |
| Arjun | Entered in Second Level | | | | | | | Arjun | Sandeep; Amardeep | Bhole; Ashwini | | House; Captain | Shobha; Amardeep | ~~Gautham~~ | Prashanth; Shobha | Yawar; Sivaji | Sivaji; Priyanka | Amardeep; Yawar | Finalist | 5th Runner-up (Day 105) | |
| Shobha | Kiran; Gautham | Sivaji; Prashanth | Subhashree; Rathika | Power Astra; Winner | Immune | Gautham | Moved to Second Level | Shobha | Amardeep; Ashwini | Teja; Bhole | | Sivaji; Yawar | Rathika; Yawar | House; Captain | Yawar; Ashwini | Sivaji; Arjun | Prashanth; Yawar | Yawar; Sivaji | Evicted (Day 98) | | |
| Gautham | Shobha; Yawar | Prashanth; Rathika | Rathika; Amardeep | Yawar; ~~Teja~~ | Amardeep; Sivaji | Nominated | Evicted by Housemates (Day 35) | Gautham | Sandeep (to save) | Bhole; Sivaji | | Prashanth; Bhole | House; Captain | Sivaji | Arjun; Amardeep | Prashanth; Sivaji | Prashanth; Sivaji | Evicted (Day 91) | | | |
| Rathika | Priyanka; Damini | Teja; Prashanth | Subhashree; Gautham | Nominated | Evicted (Day 28) | | | Rathika | Evicted in First Level | Guest | Evicted in First Level | Shobha; Amardeep | Priyanka; Shobha | Bhole; Gautham; Sivaji; Yawar; ~~Priyanka~~ | Shobha; Priyanka | Amardeep; Prashanth | Evicted (Day 84) | | | | |
| Ashwini | Entered in Second Level | | | | | | | Ashwini | Amardeep; Shobha | Pooja; Arjun | | Shobha; Priyanka | Yawar; Rathika | Bhole; Gautham; Sivaji; Yawar; ~~Priyanka~~ | Priyanka; Amardeep | Refused to nominate | Evicted (Day 83) | | | | |
| Bhole | Entered in Second Level | | | | | | | Bhole | Amardeep; Sandeep | Shobha; Priyanka | | Shobha; Gautham | Priyanka; Amardeep | ~~Amardeep~~ | Evicted (Day 70) | | | | | | |
| Teja | Prashanth; Kiran | Prashanth; Rathika | Prashanth; Gautham | Nominated | Gautham; Yawar | Nominated | Moved to Second Level | Teja | Sandeep; Nayani | Pooja; Prashanth | | Ashwini; Sandeep | Arjun; Rathika | Evicted (Day 63) | | | | | | | |
| Sandeep | Rathika; Yawar | Power Astra; Winner | Teja (to save); Amardeep (to evict) | Gautham; Priyanka; Rathika; Subhashree; Teja; Yawar | Immune | Teja | Moved to Second Level | Sandeep | Yawar; Arjun | Bhole; Prashanth | | Ashwini; Bhole | Evicted (Day 56) | | | | | | | | |
| Pooja | Entered in Second Level | | | | | | | Pooja | Teja; Yawar | Bhole; Ashwini | | Evicted (Day 49) | | | | | | | | | |
| Nayani | Entered in Second Level | | | | | | | Nayani | Teja; Amardeep | Evicted (Day 42) | | | | | | | | | | | |
| Subhashree | Rathika; Shobha | Teja; Prashanth | Teja; Priyanka | Rathika; ~~Amardeep~~ | Amardeep; Priyanka | Evicted (Day 35) | | Subhashree | Evicted in First Level | Guest | Evicted in First Level | | | | | | | | | | |
| Damini | Rathika; Shobha | Sivaji; Prashanth | Yawar; Subhashree | Evicted (Day 21) | | | | Damini | Evicted in First Level | Guest | Evicted in First Level | | | | | | | | | | |
| Shakeela | Yawar; Prashanth | Sivaji; Prashanth | Evicted (Day 14) | | | | | Shakeela | Evicted in First Level | | | | | | | | | | | | |
| Kiran | Shobha; Prashanth | Evicted (Day 7) | | | | | | Kiran | Evicted in First Level | | | | | | | | | | | | |
| Notes | - | 1, 2 | 1, 3 | 1, 4, 5 | 1, 6, 7 | 8 | 9 | Notes | 10, 11 | | 12 | 13 | - | 14 | 15 | 16 | 17,18 | 19 | 20,21 | 22,23 | 24 |
| Against Public Vote | Damini; Gautham; Kiran; Prashanth; Rathika; Shakeela; Shobha; Yawar | Amardeep; Gautham; Prashanth; Rathika; Shakeela; Shobha; ~~Sivaji~~; Teja; Yawar | Amardeep; Damini; Gautham; Priyanka; Rathika; Subhashree; ~~Teja~~; Yawar | Gautham; Priyanka; Rathika; Subhashree; Teja; Yawar | Amardeep; Gautham; Priyanka; Sivaji; Subhashree; Teja; Yawar | Gautam; Teja | none | Against Public Vote | Amardeep; Ashwini; Nayani; Pooja; ~~Sandeep~~; Shobha; Teja; Yawar | | Amardeep; Ashwini; Bhole; Gautham; Prashanth; Pooja; Teja | Amardeep; Ashwini; Bhole; Gautham; Priyanka; Sandeep; Shobha; Sivaji | Amardeep; Arjun; Bhole; Priyanka; Rathika; Shobha; Teja; Yawar | Bhole; Gautham; Rathika; Sivaji; Yawar | Amardeep; Arjun; Ashwini; Gautham; Priyanka; Rathika; Shobha; Yawar | Amardeep; Arjun; Ashwini; Gautham; Prashanth; Rathika; Sivaji; Yawar | ~~Arjun~~; Gautham; Prashanth; Priyanka; Shobha; Sivaji; Yawar | Amardeep; Arjun; Prashanth; Priyanka; Shobha; Sivaji; Yawar | Amardeep; Arjun; Prashanth; Priyanka; Sivaji; Yawar | | |
| Re-entered | none | | | | | | none | Re-entered | Gautham | Sivaji | | Rathika | none | | | | | | | | |
| Walked | none | | | | | | none | Walked | none | Sivaji | none | | | | | | | | | | |
| Secret Room | none | | | | | | none | Secret Room | Gautham | none | | | | | | | | | | | |
| Evicted | Kiran | Shakeela | Damini | Rathika | Subhashree | Gautham | none | Evicted | Nayani | | Pooja | Sandeep | Teja | Bhole | No; Eviction | Ashwini | Gautham | Shobha | Arjun | Priyanka | Yawar |
| Evicted | Kiran | Shakeela | Damini | Rathika | Subhashree | Gautham | none | Evicted | Nayani | | Pooja | Sandeep | Teja | Bhole | No; Eviction | Rathika | Gautham | Shobha | Sivaji | Amardeep | Prashanth |
| Ref. | | | | | | | | Ref. | | | | | | | | | | | | | |

Color Keys

indicates the Power Astra Winner.
indicates the House Captain.
indicates the Nominees for house captaincy.
indicates that the Housemate was safe prior to nominations.
indicates that the Housemate was directly nominated for eviction before the regular nominations process.
indicates the winner.
indicates the first runner-up.
indicates the second runner-up.
indicates the third runner-up.
indicates the fourth runner-up.
indicates the fifth runner up.
indicates that the contestant was moved to secret room.
indicates that the contestant has re-entered the house.
indicates that the contestant walked out of the show.
indicates that the contestant was ejected from the house.
indicates that the contestant was evicted.
indicates that the contestant was evicted by housemates.

=== Nomination notes ===
- ^1: Confirmed housemates the winners of Power Astra were immune from nominations.
- ^2: In week 2, Sandeep as first Power Astra winner had a special power to directly nominate one housemate. He chose Yawar.
- ^3: In week 3, Sandeep and Sivaji as Power Astra winners had a special power to swap one nominated housemate with one not nominated housemate. They mutually chose to save Teja and nominate Amardeep.
- ^4: In week 4, Sandeep, Sivaji and Shobha choose five housemate to nominate. Those housemates will nominate two housemates, but Sandeep, Sivaji and Shobha will mutually choose one of the two to nominate.
- ^5: At the end of nominations, Sandeep, Shivaji and Shobha had a special power to directly nominated one housemate. They chose Teja.
- ^6: As a punishment for getting physical in Task, Teja was directly nominated for week 5.
- ^7: Contestants decided that Sivaji is not a fair umpire in the task and does not deserve to be a confirmed housemate. Sivaji lost his Power Astra and became a contestant.
- ^8: Seven safe housemates had to vote to evict one of the Bottom 2 nominated housemates Gautam and Teja. Gautam was fake-evicted and moved to secret room.
- ^9: Bigg Boss Season 7 2.0 - Second Level begin with new twists and turns.
- ^10: New housemates had to nominate two old housemates and old housemates had to nominate one new housemate & one old housemate.
- ^11: After Week 6 Nominations, Gautam returned from Secret Room and had a special power to save one nominated housemate.
- ^12: On Day 42, Sivaji left the house for a medical emergency check-up and returned back on the same day.
- ^13: On Day 49, Host Nagarjuna revealed that Rathika received the least votes from the housemate to return to the house. She entered the house and was immune for a week.
- ^14: In week 10, Ashwini, Priyanka, Rathika and Shobha were the queens in power. Other housemates had to nominate one housemate and represent to the queens, the queens then mutually choose to accept one of the two to nominate. After 4 rounds, the queens had to mutually nominate one of them. It was a tie between Priyanka and Rathika, so Captain Shobha chose to nominate Rathika.
- ^15: On Day 77, Host Nagarjuna announced that the elimination was cancelled due to Yawar surrendering the Eviction Pass, rendering it unusable.
- ^16: During week 12 nominations process, Ashwini refused to nominate, therefore was directly nominated by Bigg Boss.
- ^17: On Day 81, Bigg Boss cancelled the last captaincy task for the week, due to Sivaji and Shobha are not came to final decision for shoot the photo of their choice in captaincy contender task.
- ^18: On Day 90, Host declared that Arjun won the Finale Astra task and became the 1st finalist of the season, so he was exempted from the nomination list.
- ^19: On Day 90, Host declared Amardeep as captain for week 14 as he became runner-up of Finale Astra task but he will not get immunity.
- ^20: On Day 98, Amardeep, Arjun, Prashanth, Priyanka, Sivaji and Yawar announced as Top 6 finalists.
- ^21: On Day 105, Priyanka become as 4th runner-up while Arjun become as 5th runner-up.
- ^22: On Day 105, Yawar accepted 15 lakh rupees from prize money then he walked out of the house and become as 3rd runner-up.
- ^23: On Day 105, Sivaji become as 2nd runner-up.
- ^24: On Day 105, Prashanth won the title and Amardeep become as 1st runner-up.
