= Bigg Boss (Telugu TV series) season 1 =

Bigg Boss
- Season 1
- Season 1 eye logo
- Presented by: Jr. NTR
- No. of days: 70
- No. of housemates: 16
- Winner: Siva Balaji
- Runner-up: Aadarsh Balakrishna
- No. of episodes: 71

Release
- Original network: Star Maa
- Original release: 16 July – 24 September 2017

Season chronology
- Next → Season 2

Bigg Boss 1 is the first season of the Telugu-language version of the Indian reality television series Bigg Boss. was premiered on 16 July 2017 on Star Maa. Jr NTR hosted the show. For this season of Bigg Boss, a lavish house set was constructed in Lonavala. Siva Balaji was the winner. The prize money for the winner was Rs. 50 lakhs (5,000,000 or 50,00,000).

== Housemates status ==
Sr	Housemate	Day entered	Day exited	Status
1	Siva Balaji	Day 1	Day 70	Winner
2	Aadarsh	Day 1	Day 70	1st Runner-up
3	Hariteja	Day 1	Day 70	2nd Runner-up
4	Navdeep	Day 28	Day 70	3rd Runner-up
5	Archana	Day 1	Day 70	4th Runner-up
6	Diksha	Day 15	Day 63	Evicted
7	Prince	Day 1	Day 56	Evicted
8	Mumaith	Day 1	Day 10	Ejected
8	Mumaith	Day 37	Day 49	Evicted
9	Dhanraj	Day 1	Day 42	Evicted
10	Karthika	Day 1	Day 41	Evicted
11	Kalpana	Day 1	Day 28	Evicted
12	Mahesh	Day 1	Day 27	Evicted
13	Sameer	Day 1	Day 21	Evicted
14	Madhupriya	Day 1	Day 14	Evicted
15	Sampoornesh	Day 1	Day 9	Walked
16	Jyothi	Day 1	Day 7	Evicted

== Housemates ==
The participants in the order they entered the house are: ! Entered

=== Original entrants ===
1. Archana Shastry — Film actress
2. Sameer Hasan — Film actor
3. Mumaith Khan — Film actress
4. Prince Cecil — Film actor
5. Madhu Priya — Singer
6. Jyothi Lakshmi — Film actress
7. Siva Balaji — Film actor
8. Kalpana Raghavendar — Singer
9. Mahesh Kathi — Movie critic
10. Kathi Karthika — Politician
11. Sampoornesh Babu— Film actor
12. Aadarsh Balakrishna — Film actor
13. Hari Teja — Film actress
14. Dhanraj — Comedian

=== Wild Card entries ===
1. Diksha Panth — Film actress
2. Navdeep — Film actor

== Reception ==
The Bigg Boss Telugu program is regarded as one of the most expensive Telugu television shows. The launch of season 1 opened with 16.18 TVR and became the most watched Telugu television show.
