= Run (2020 Indian film) =

2020 film directed by Lakshmikanth Chenna

- Poster
- Directed by: Lakshmikanth Chenna
- Written by: Sahana Dutta
- Produced by: Yeduguru Rajeev Reddy; Saibabu Jagarlamudi
- Starring: Navdeep; Pujita Ponnada
- Cinematography: Sajeesh Rajendran
- Edited by: Ramakrishna Arram
- Music by: Naresh Kumaran
- Production company: First Frame Entertainments
- Distributed by: Aha
- Release date: 29 May 2020
- Running time: 87 minutes
- Country: India
- Language: Telugu

Run is a 2020 Indian Telugu-language psychological thriller film directed by Lakshmikanth Chenna, starring Navdeep and Pujita Ponnada. Produced by Y. Rajeev Reddy and Sai Baba Jagarlamudi under First Frame Entertainments banner, the film was released on Aha on 29 May 2020. The film is reported to be the first Telugu direct-to-OTT release film and is one of the most streamed films on Aha.

== Plot ==
Shruthi and Sandeep are a couple. They arrange for a lunch date on their anniversary, but they never meet because Shruthi has died unexpectedly. Sandeep becomes a suspect in her mysterious death.

== Cast ==
- Navdeep as Sandeep Reddy
- Pujita Ponnada as Shruthi
- Amit Tiwari as Khaleel
- Bhanu Sri as Rosy
- Mukhtar Khan as Shankar Reddy
- Kausalya as Imaginary Doctor
- Shafi as Real Doctor
- Hari Chandra as Babai (transl. Uncle)
- Kireeti as Rahul
- Venkat as Bharath
- Gautham Bhavaraju as Sunil
- Harsha Sai as a police officer

== Production ==
Run was originally intended to be a web series for Aha. It was planned as an 8-episode series with each episode spanning 20 minutes. However Allu Aravind, who is a part of Aha's team, believed that Run should be an original feature film.

Principal photography took place for 24 days, between October and November 2019.

== Release ==
The film was released directly on the OTT platform Aha, on 29 May 2020.

== Reception ==
Run received mixed reviews from critics. Sangeetha Devi Dundoo of The Hindu, called the film "A lacklustre psychological thriller." While praising Navdeep's performance, Dundoo stated that the screenplay was predictable and could have been better executed. The Times of India heavily criticized the film for its incoherent script and a poorly-written screenplay. Pratyush Parasaraman writing for the Film Companion, also gave a negative review for the film. However, the film became one of the most streamed Telugu films till date.
