= Keerthi Bhat =

Indian actress

- Born: Keerthi Keshav Bhat; Bangalore, Karnataka, India
- Occupation: Actress
- Years active: 2017–present
- Known for: Manasichi Choodu; Karthika Deepam; Bigg Boss Telugu 6 Madhuranagarilo

Keerthi Keshav Bhat, known professionally as Keerthi Bhat, is an Indian actress who primarily works in Kannada and Telugu television. She made her acting debut with Ice Mahal in 2017. Bhat is best known for her portrayal of Bhanu in Manasichi Choodu and Dr. Hima Karthik in Karthika Deepam (Telugu TV series). In 2022, she appeared in the Telugu reality show Bigg Boss Telugu 6 as a contestant and emerged as the 2nd runner-up.

== Early life and family ==
Bhat was born in Bangalore, Karnataka, India. In 2017, Keerthi's family members met with an accident, losing her entire family, including her father, mother, brother, and sister-in-law. In August 2023, Keerthi engaged with actor Vijay Karthik. In 2026, Keerthi and Karthik broke up.

== Career ==
Bhat began her acting career in 2017; she made her first Kannada debut film, Ice Mahal. From 2019 to 2022, she portrayed the leading role of Bhanumathi a.k.a. Bhanu in Star Maa's soap opera Manasichi Choodu. In 2021, she participated in many Telugu TV Show, including 100% Love, which aired on Star Maa's channel. She appeared in Star Maa Parivaar League Season 3.

In 2022, she was seen portraying Dr.Hima Karthik in Star Maa's Karthika Deepam (Telugu TV series) opposite Manas Nagulapalli and Manoj Kumar. Since September 2022, she has been seen participating in Star Maa's reality show Bigg Boss (Telugu season 6).

From March 2023 to June 2024, she portrayed the leading role of Star Maa's serial Madhuranagarilo as Raadha. After Madhuranagarilo Bhat was cast as Radha in Gemini TV's Radha as Radha in 2024.

== Filmography ==
=== Films ===
Key
| † | Denotes films that have not yet been released |

| Year | Title | Role | Language | Ref. |
|---|---|---|---|---|
| 2017 | Ice Mahal | Kanaka | Kannada | |
| 2019 | Point out | —N/a | Kannada | |
| TBA | Kaaneyagiddaale † | Kaveri | Kannada | |

=== Television ===
| Year | Title | Role | Channel | Notes | Ref. |
|---|---|---|---|---|---|
| 2019-2022 | Manasichi Choodu | Bhanumathi Aadi | Star Maa | | |
| 2022 | Karthika Deepam | Dr. Hima Karthik | Star Maa | | |
| 2022 | Bigg Boss 6 | Contestant | Star Maa | 2nd Runner-Up | |
| 2023-2024 | Madhuranagarilo | Radha Shyam | Star Maa | | |
| 2024-2025 | Radha | Radha Shyam | Gemini TV | | |
| 2026 | BB Jodi | Contestant | Star Maa | Quit | |
| 2026-present | Mooguthi Malli | Mithila | Udaya TV | Kannada | |
| 2026-present | Mukkera Meenakshi | Mithila | Gemini TV | Telugu | |

==== Special appearances ====
| Year | Title | Role | Channel | Notes | Ref. |
|---|---|---|---|---|---|
| 2020 | Jatharo Jathara | Herself | Disney+ Hotstar | Guest Contestant | —N/a |
| 2021 | 100% Love | Herself | Star Maa | Guest Contestant | —N/a |
| 2021 | Star Maa Parivaar Championship | Herself | Star Maa | Guest Contestant | —N/a |
| 2021 | Star Maa Parivaar League Season 3 | Herself | Star Maa | Duet dance performance (With Sekhar Master) | —N/a |
| 2021 | Maa Varalakshmi Vratham | Herself | Star Maa | Special performance | —N/a |
| 2021 | Pandage Pandaga | Herself | Star Maa | Special performance | —N/a |
| 2021 | Star Maa Parivaar Awards | Herself | Star Maa | Duet dance performance (With Sekhar Master) | —N/a |
| 2021 | Start Music Season 3 | Herself | Star Maa | Guest Contestant | —N/a |
| 2022 | Maa Sankranthi Veduka | Herself | Star Maa | Special dance performance | —N/a |
| 2022 | BB Jodi | Contestant | Disney+ Hotstar | Couple Show (With Mahesh Babu Kalidasu) | —N/a |
| 2022 | Ishmart Jodi Season 2 | Herself | Star Maa | Couple Show (With Mahesh Babu Kalidasu) | —N/a |
| 2022 | Moguds vs Pellams | Herself | Star Maa | Couple Show (With Mahesh Babu Kalidasu) | —N/a |
| 2022 | Bigg Boss Intilo Maa Parivaar | Contestant | Disney+ Hotstar | Celebrities Show | |
| 2022 | Sridevi Drama Company | Guest Contestant | ETV Network | Special dance performance (With Mahesh Babu Kalidasu) | —N/a |
| 2022 | Ee Varsham Sakshiga | Herself | Disney+ Hotstar | Guest Contestant | —N/a |
| 2022 | Super Singer Junior | Herself | Star Maa | Special dance performance (With Maanas Nagulapalli) | —N/a |
| 2023 | Aadivaram With Star Maa Parivaram | Herself | Star Maa | Guest Contestant | —N/a |
| 2023 | Gemini Mela | Host | Gemini TV | (With Anchor Ravi Kiran) | —N/a |
| 2023 | Maa Bonalu Jathara | Herself | Star Maa | Guest Contestant | —N/a |
| 2023 | Vinayaka Chavithi | Herself | Star Maa | Guest Contestant | —N/a |
| 2023 | Aadivaram With Star Maa Parivaram | Herself | Star Maa | Guest Contestant | —N/a |
| 2023 | Sridevi Drama Company | Herself | ETV Network | Guest Contestant | —N/a |
| 2023 | Aadivaram With Star Maa Parivaram | Herself | Star Maa | Guest Contestant | —N/a |
| 2024 | Super Jodi | Herself | Zee Telugu | Guest Contestant | —N/a |
| 2024 | Sivangivey | Herself | Zee Telugu | Guest Contestant | —N/a |
| 2024 | Aadivaram With Star Maa Parivaram | Herself | Star Maa | Guest Contestant | —N/a |
| 2024 | Drama Juniors Season 7 | Herself | Zee Telugu | Guest Contestant | —N/a |
| 2024 | Aadivaram With Star Maa Parivaram | Herself | Star Maa | Guest Contestant | —N/a |
| 2024 | Ee Deepavaliki Motamogipoddi | Herself | ETV Network | Guest Contestant | —N/a |
| 2024 | Suma Adda | Herself | ETV Network | Guest Contestant | —N/a |
| 2025 | Ishmart Jodi Season 3 | Herself | Star Maa | Guest Contestant | —N/a |
| 2025 | Aadivaram With Star Maa Parivaram | Herself | Star Maa | Guest Contestant | —N/a |
| 2025 | Sridevi Drama Company | Herself | ETV Network | Guest Contestant | —N/a |
| 2025 | Suma Adda | Herself | ETV Network | Guest Contestant | —N/a |

=== Music videos ===
| Year | Title | Singer(s) | Ref. |
|---|---|---|---|
| 2023 | Sankranthi ThakaThai | Anoop Menon & Lakshmi Hoysal | |
| 2025 | Bathukamma | Prabha | |

== Awards and nominations ==
| Year | Award | Category | Show | Result |
|---|---|---|---|---|
| 2023 | Yash International Award | Indian Gem Achiever Award | —N/a | Won |
| 2025 | Icons of Excellence Awards 2025 | Best Small Screen Popular Actress | —N/a | Won |
