= Naa Style Veru =

- Promotional poster
- Directed by: G. Ram Prasad
- Written by: Kona Venkat (dialogues)
- Story by: Dishira Film Unit
- Based on: Hallo by Rafi Mecartin
- Produced by: Maganti Gopinath
- Starring: Rajasekhar; Bhumika Chawla
- Cinematography: S. Arunkumar
- Edited by: Kotagiri Venkateswara Rao
- Music by: Anup Rubens
- Production company: Dishira Productions
- Release date: 12 June 2009
- Country: India
- Language: Telugu

Naa Style Veru (transl. My style is different) is a 2009 Indian Telugu-language drama film directed by G. Ram Prasad and starring Rajasekhar and Bhumika Chawla. The film is a remake of the Malayalam film Hallo (2007). The film was released to negative reviews, but succeeded at the box office.

== Plot ==
Since the death of his lover, Sivaram, an advocate, does not get along with his father, a magistrate, and his ACP brother. Soon, he gets involved in helping a girl whose family is out to kill her.

== Cast ==
- Rajasekhar as Sivaram
- Bhumika Chawla as Parvathy
- Brahmanandam as Appachan
- Ali as Johnny
- Venu Madhav as SI Rajalingam
- Annapurna as Rajyalakshmi
- Chalapathi Rao as Krishnam Raju
- Vijayakumar as Kalki Narayana Murthy
- Telangana Shakuntala as Shakuntala
- K. Viswanath as Raghavayya
- Ahuti Prasad as Raghavendra
- Paruchuri Venkateswara Rao as Venkatachalam
- Giri Babu as DGP Rama Chandra Murthy
- Dhandapani as MLA Bhoopathi
- Raghu Babu as Prasad
- Jeeva as Narayana
- Nadhiya as Prabhavati
- Devaraj as Sripathi Rao
- Banerjee as ACP Kishore
- Prudhvi Raj as Subrahmanyam
- Amit Tiwari as Madhukar
- Kaushal Manda as Praveen
- Ravi Prakash as Radha Krishna Simha
- Khayyum as Poonam
- Kirat as Divya
- Rajitha as Swarajya Lakshmi
- Geetha Singh as Soundarya
- Tarzan as Telangana Sakthi
- Surekha Vani
- Prabhavathi
- Karate Kalyani

== Production ==
The film began production in December of 2008. The film was expected to be a comeback for Bhumika Chawla after consecutive flops. The film entered post-production in May 2009. The yellow car used in the film was placed at Gokul Theatre in Visakhapatnam as part of the film's promotions.

== Soundtrack ==
Naa Style Veru

Soundtrack album by Anup Rubens
- Released: 20 April 2009
- Recorded: 2009
- Genre: Feature film soundtrack
- Language: Telugu
- Label: Aditya Music

Anup Rubens chronology
House Full (2009)	Naa Style Veru (2009)	Seeta Ramula Kalyanam Lankalo (2010)

The music was composed by Anup Rubens and was written by Bhaskarabhatla and Vijaykumar.

1. "Elare Ela Ela" - Shankar Mahadevan, Geetha Madhuri
2. "Oh Oh Jane Jana" - Geetha Madhuri
3. "Aate Aadana" - Pranavi
4. "Guppedu Gundello" - Karthik, Gopika Poornima
5. "Kottu Kottu" - Tippu, Raju, Jai Srinivas
6. "Oh Oh Jane Jana" - Geetha Madhuri

== Release ==
The film was initially scheduled to release on 5 June 2024.
