= Yagam (2010 film) =

- Film poster
- Directed by: P. A. Arun Prasad
- Produced by: Raju; Praveen
- Starring: Navdeep; Bhumika Chawla; Kim Sharma; Rahul Dev
- Cinematography: Bharani K. Dharan
- Edited by: Marthand K. Venkatesh
- Music by: Mani Sharma
- Production company: Silver Screen Movies
- Release date: 19 March 2010
- Country: India
- Language: Telugu

Yagam (transl. Ritual) is a 2010 Telugu film directed by P. A. Arun Prasad starring Navdeep, Bhumika Chawla and Kim Sharma. The film was partially re-shot and released in Tamil as Sinam (transl. Anger) with Sathyaraj and Sathyan replacing Ajay and Harsha Vardhan, respectively. The Tamil version released on 3 February 2012.

== Cast ==
- Navdeep as Danny
- Bhumika Chawla as Nandini
- Kim Sharma as Sophie
- Inder Kumar as Antony
- Rahul Dev as Sanjay Arya
- Ajay as Buchibabu
  - Sathyaraj as Mani Ratnam (Tamil version)
- Harsha Vardhan as Chandramouli
  - Sathyan as Sathya (Tamil version)
- Ali as Priest
- Brahmanandam as Ghost chaser
- Rocket Raghava as Kung Fu Master

== Production ==
The film was shot in Bangkok in 2009.

== Soundtrack ==
No.	Title	Length
1.	"La La Lailey"
2.	"O Sari Ayina"
