= Mythri (2012 film) =

- Theatrical release poster
- Directed by: Surya Raju
- Written by: Surya Raju
- Produced by: Rajesh Kumar
- Starring: Navdeep; Sadha; Bramhanandam; Uttej; Chitram Srinu
- Cinematography: Selva Kumar
- Edited by: Vinay
- Music by: Vikas
- Production company: Hanu Cine Creations
- Release date: November 30, 2012 (India)
- Running time: 123 minutes
- Country: India
- Language: Telugu

Mythri is a 2012 Indian mystery film directed by Surya Raju starring Navdeep and Sadha in the lead roles. Rajesh Kumar produced the movie on Hanu Cine Creations Banner and Vikas provided the music.

The film released on 30 November 2012. The film was later dubbed and released in Tamil as Mythili in August 2014.

== Synopsis ==
Deepu is a young man whose dream is to make a music album and gain fame. He approaches a channel head Murthy who, impressed by his concept, offers to finance the filming and also suggests his obese secretary as the heroine. Disappointed first, Deepu takes up the offer as he has no choice and chooses an old bungalow for the shoot at a secluded spot. As work begins, Mythri, the owner of the property, arrives for a short stay and Deepu convinces her to be the heroine of the album and removes Murthy's secretary. Meanwhile, the death of a unit member and a series of strange incidents take place. The unit leaves after the work is wrapped up without any doubts. Deepu stays back with Mythri and unravels the mystery of the house. Towards the end of the story, the mystery behind the deaths and the strange incidents is revealed.

== Cast ==
- Navdeep as Deepu
- Sadha as Mythri
- Bramhanandam as Murthy
- Uttej
- Chitram Srinu
- Suman Setty
- Kallu Chidambaram
- Satyam Rajesh
- Bhikshu

== Production ==
The movie was launched at Annapurna Studios on 6 May 2012. Karumuri Venkata Nageswara Rao, Nandini Reddy, Satish Reddy, Rajesh Kumar, Surya Raju attended this event. Since then the movie was shot in a nonstop mode. This marks the return of Sadha to Telugu and Tamil Industry and in this film, she plays the titular role of Mythri, a docile and well mannered young woman during day time. But once the sun goes down, a peculiar change can be observed in Mythri. She turns hysterical, roams around all alone and behaves in mystical ways and the story is all about this change and the mystery behind it. The movie was Scheduled for a release on 30 November 2012 which is exactly a week after the release of Nagarjuna's Dhamarukam.It is available to watch online. Makers have released the original DVD rip.

== Soundtrack ==
Mythri

Soundtrack album by Vikas
- Released: 24 September 2012
- Recorded: 2012
- Genre: Feature film soundtrack
- Length: 18:18
- Language: Telugu
- Label: Hanu Music
- Producer: Vikas

The audio was Launched at Hyderabad on 24 September 2012. Vikas provided the music. The audio album has also been released into the market by the producer himself on his own audio label.

Tracklist
No.	Title	Lyrics	Artist(s)	Length
1.	"Made In India"	Sahitya Sagar	Geetha Madhuri, Vikas, Raghuram, Dhanunjay	3:47
2.	"Jil Jil Jil"	Sreshta	Tejaswini	4:05
3.	"Aa Ra Ra Pedave"	Sahitya Sagar	Deepu, Sravana Bhargavi	3:15
4.	"Ningiloni Neeli Megham"	Ramajogayya Sastry	Bhargavi Pillai, Rolls Ride Megawatt	3:43
5.	"Dha Dha Dha Dance"	Sreshta	Umaneha, Vikas, Raghuram, Dhanunjay	3:27
Total length:				18:18
