= Kaushal Manda =

Indian actor and model

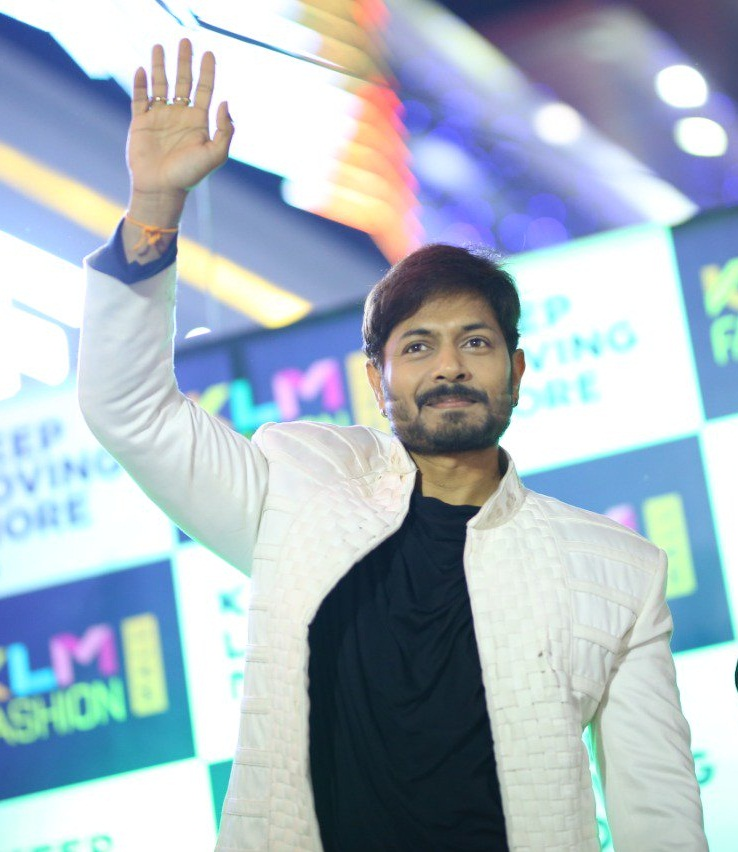
- Kaushal in 2018 at KLM Fashion
- Born: 13 May 1981 (age 45); Visakhapatnam, Andhra Pradesh, India
- Education: Andhra University
- Occupations: Actor; model
- Years active: 1982 – present
- Political party: BJP (2019-present)
- Spouse: Neelima Kaushal
- Children: 2
- Website: www.kaushalmanda.com

Kaushal Manda is an Indian actor and model who predominantly works in Telugu language films and TV serials.

== Career ==
=== Acting ===
Manda made his debut as a child artist in 1982–1983 with Telugu TV serial Evanni Chedanunchu. Then he participated in the Grasim Mr. India contest in 1998 and became one of the top 6 finalists in the show. He made a lead role in Gemini TV's blockbuster show Chakravakam (2003-2008). He won the Nandi Award for the Best TV Actor in 2003 for his role as Sagar in Chakravakam. He was the host for Gemini TV's popular dance show Dance Baby Dance in 2005. He also made a role in Gemini TV's Devatha (2010-2013). He did a lead role in Zee Telugu's Suryavamsham serial from 2017 to 2019. He was a contestant and the winner of Star Maa's reality TV show Bigg Boss Telugu 2.

He made his film debut with a supporting role in Mahesh Babu's debut film, Rajakumarudu, in 1999 and also played a role in Prabhas's film Mr. Perfect (2011). He appeared in 85 films and 38 serials. Manda continued his modelling career and appeared in many commercial ads. He started his own model management and ad film company, The Looks Productions in 1999.

=== Politics ===
Kaushal Manda joined the Bharatiya Janata Party in November 2019.

== Television ==
Year	Title	Role	Channel	Notes
1982-1985	Evanni Chedanunchu	Child Artist	Doordarshan	
1998	Grasim Mr. India	Top 6 Contestants		
2003- 2008	Chakravakam	Sagar	Gemini TV	
2005- 2010	Dance Baby Dance	Host	Gemini TV	
2010- 2013	Devatha		Gemini TV	
2011	No.23 Mahalakshmi Nivasam	Vikram	Gemini TV	
2013- 2014	Brindavanam		Zee Telugu	
2017- 2020	Suryavamsham	Adishankar	Zee Telugu	winner of super serial championship
2018	Bigg Boss Telugu 2	Winner	Star Maa	
2020	Agni Sakshi	Rathod	Star Maa	
2021–present	Ishmart jodi 2	Contestant	Star Maa	

== Filmography ==
=== Films ===
Year	Film	Role(s)	Notes	Ref
1999	Rajakumarudu		Debut	
2000	Badri			
2000	Bachi	Special Branch Officer		
2001	Sampangi	Abhishek's friend		
2001	Akasa Veedhilo	Terrorist		
2001	Manasantha Nuvve	Eve teaser		
2002	Sreeram	Sreeram's friend		
2002	Siva Rama Raju			
2002	Nee Sneham	Madhav's Friend		
2003	Jodi No. 1	Ravi		
2003	Ottesi Cheputunna	Eve teaser		
2003	Aayudham	Shravan Kumar		
2003	Charminar			
2004	Love Today	Kaushal		
2004	Venky			
2004	Nenunnanu			
2004	Okatavudhuam	Gurunadhan	Lead role	
2005	Anukokunda Oka Roju	Rowdy Teenager		
2006	Asadhyudu	College student		
2008	Mukhbiir		Hindi film	
2009	Drona	Pub emcee		
2009	Naa Style Veru	Praveen		
2010	Comedy Express	Mahesh		
2010	Anaganaga Oka Aranyam			
2011	Mr. Perfect	Priya's cousin		
2011	Nenu Naa Rakshasi	Rajesh		
2012	Daruvu	Goon in Pub		
2022	Athanu Ame Priyudu			
2025	Kannappa	Maali		

== Advertisements ==
Kaushal's ad campaigns are done under his marketing communication agency, "The Looks Productions" Model for Babaji Boxer, Grasim, Giordani, Aparna Sarovar, Vijaya Textiles, IKEA, Oakwood Hotels, M&S, Linen Club, Linen Vogue, RS Bros, South India Shopping Mall, and Visakha Dairy
