= Karate Kalyani =

Indian actress

- Born: Padaala Kalyani; 31 October
- Occupation: Actress
- Years active: 2000–present
- Known for: Character roles in films
- Notable work: Performing harikatha continuously for 114 hours 45 minutes and 55 seconds.

Padaala Kalyani (born 31 October), better known as Karate Kalyani, is an Indian character actress, comedian and harikatha artist from Vizianagaram, Andhra Pradesh. She works predominantly in Telugu cinema.

== Personal life ==
Padaala Kalyani was born on 31 October to Padaala Ramdas, who was a mridangam and harikatha artist in All India Radio, and Vijaya Lakshmi. She hails from Vizianagaram. She has two brothers. She holds a black belt in karate. In an interview, she said she is an avid believer in horoscope. She was married twice and divorced both her husbands. In an interview she said that she tried to commit suicide a few times due to problems in her family. In May 2022, Hyderabad Child Welfare Department alleged that Kalyani adopted a three-month child against the regulations. Kalyani denied the allegations and stated that she did not kidnap nor runaway with the child and that she was only giving care to the baby and was waiting for her to turn 1-year old so she could be legally adopted.

== Career ==
Kalyani predominantly works in the Telugu cinema and is known for her roles in films like Krishna, Chatrapathi and Mirapakay. She has also done some vamp characters in films. She established Adhibhatla Kalapeetham to promote harikatha. In June 2015, she entered in to the Limca Book of Records for performing harikatha continuously for 114 hours 45 minutes and 55 seconds. She participated in a debate on the casting couch phenomenon with Sri Reddy Mallidi. She did not support her because of her false allegations and assaulted her on live television. In 2020, she participated in the Telugu reality TV show Bigg Boss in season 4 hosted by Nagarjuna as a contestant.

== Filmography ==
- Evadra Rowdy (2001)
- Vechivunta (2001)
- Aadi (2002)
- Seema Simham (2002)
- Maa Alludu Very Good (2003)
- Lakshmi Narasimha (2004)
- Shankar Dada M.B.B.S. (2004)
- Leela Mahal Center (2004)
- Vijayendra Varma (2004)
- Chatrapathi (2005)
- Godavari (2006)
- Navvule Navvulu (2007)
- Krishna (2008)
- Drona (2009)
- Naa Style Veru (2009)
- Mirapakay (2011)
- Aadu Magaadra Bujji (2013)
- Police Paparao (2015)
- Yevade Subramanyam (2015)
- A Aa (2016)
- Guntur Talkies (2016)
- Nenu Local (2017)
- Goutham Nanda (2017)
- Raja the Great (2017)
- Arjun Suravaram (2019)
- Gaali Sampath (2021)

== Television ==
Year	Show	Role	Ref.
2013	Gorantha Deepam	Zee telugu	
2018	Muthyala Muggu	Zee telugu	
2019	Madhumasam	Anjali Devi	Gemini tv
2020	Bigg Boss 4	Contestant	Star Maa
