= Polasa =

- Village
- Location in Telangana, India Polasa (India)
- Coordinates: 18.83°N 78.97°E
- Country: India
- State: Telangana
- District: Jagtial
- Elevation: 264 m (866 ft)

Population (2011)
  - Total: 12,274

Languages
  - Official: Telugu
- Time zone: UTC+5:30 (IST)
- PIN: 505529
- Telephone code: 918724
- Vehicle registration: TS21
- Website: telangana.gov.in

Polasa is a village located in the marikindha Jagtial district of Telangana State, India. Polasa is a village which is roughly 10 km from Jagtial town.

== Geography ==
Polasa is located at 18.9°N 79.03°E. It has an average elevation of 264 metres (866 feet).
