= Bharatiya Vidya Bhavan Public School =

Coordinates: 17.50001°N 78.30721°E

Bharatiya Vidya Bhavan's Public School, BHEL, Ramachandrapuram
- Medak, Hyderabad; Telangana; India

Information
- Type: Public School
- Motto: Ano bhadraha kritavoyantu Viswavatah (sanskrit) (Let noble thoughts come to us from every side – Rigveda, 1-89-i)
- Established: 1977
- Founder: Kulapathi K.M. Munshi
- Principal: Smt Malladi Uma Shastry
- Faculty: 132
- Enrollment: 3621 (2018-19)
- Campus: Urban
- Area: 12 acres approx
- Nickname: Bhavanites
- Affiliations: CBSE, High-School
- Website: http://bhavansbhelhyd.com
- Let noble thoughts come to us from every side as on 1 July 2010.

Bharatiya Vidya Bhavan's Public School- BHEL (BVBPS BHEL-RCPuram) is a co-educational high school with enrollment from Nursery (Pre-School) to X Standard. It is affiliated to the Central Board of Secondary Education (CBSE), India and is located in the Bharat Heavy Electricals Limited (BHEL) township. Its parent body is the Bharatiya Vidya Bhavan educational trust founded by Kulapathi Dr. K.M. Munshi in 1938.

The BHEL campus, located in the Medak District was started at the request of the BHEL Management to serve their children and others from the neighbourhood. It started classes on 18 July 1977 with 475 students enrolled.

The school follows a traditional chanting of Sanskrit slokas. Every Friday there is a Sarva Dharma Prayer, translated as All Faith Prayer.
