= Bigg Boss (Telugu TV series) season 4 =

Telugu reality television series

Bigg Boss
- Season 4
- Season 4 eye logo
- Presented by: Nagarjuna (Week 1–6, 8–15); Samantha (Week 7)
- No. of days: 105
- No. of housemates: 19
- Winner: Abijeet
- Runner-up: Akhil Sarthak
- No. of episodes: 106

Release
- Original network: Star Maa
- Original release: 6 September – 20 December 2020

Season chronology
- ← Previous; Season 3 Next → Season 5

Bigg Boss 4 is the fourth season of the Telugu version of the Indian reality television series Bigg Boss based on Dutch series Big Brother. The show premiered on 6 September 2020 on Star Maa and Disney+ Hotstar with Nagarjuna hosting the season for the second time, while Samantha appeared as a guest host for a week.

The season's finale took place on 20 December 2020 with Abijeet winning the title along with ₹2.5 million prize money and a bike, while Akhil Sarthak emerged as the first runner-up.

== Production ==
=== Delay ===
The makers were scheduled to launch on the last week of June 2020 but it was delayed due to the COVID-19 pandemic. On 20 July 2020, the makers unveiled the title logo. Season 4 was initially planned to launch on 30 August 2020 but was pushed to 6 September 2020.

=== Bigg Boss 4 Buzzz ===
Bigg Boss 4 Buzzz is an Indian Telugu-language television talk show about the reality television series Bigg Boss Telugu. The host Rahul Sipligunj conducts the talk show with the evicted contestants of Bigg Boss 4 on every Monday. The show premiered on 7 September 2020 onwards on Star Maa Music. The unseen portions of episodes that were not aired on television are streamed on Disney+ Hotstar and aired on Star Maa Music as Bigg Boss 4 Buzzz.

=== Reception ===
The launch of season 4 opened with 18.5 TVR, the highest among all Bigg Boss editions.

On Week 7, Samantha hosted the show in absence of the main host Nagarjuna due to his movie shooting and the episode was also extended to 3 hours, from the usual 1½ hours.

The grand finale of season 4 became the most-watched and created a record with viewership as it garnered the highest TRP rating of 19.51 TVR and in the two Telugu speaking states it received 21.7 TVR.

=== Voting process ===
Bigg Boss 4 Telugu voting process took place online, viewers voted for their favourite contestant through Disney+ Hotstar or by giving a missed call.

== Housemates status ==
Sr	Housemate	Day entered	Day exited	Status
1	Abhijeet	Day 1	Day 105	Winner
2	Akhil	Day 1	Day 105	1st Runner-up
3	Sohel	Day 1	Day 105	Walked, 2nd Runner-up
4	Ariyana	Day 1	Day 105	3rd Runner-up
5	Harika	Day 1	Day 105	4th Runner up
6	Monal	Day 1	Day 98	Evicted
7	Avinash	Day 11	Day 91	Evicted
8	Lasya	Day 1	Day 77	Evicted
9	Mehaboob	Day 1	Day 70	Evicted
10	Amma	Day 1	Day 63	Evicted
11	Noel	Day 1	Day 53	Walked
12	Divi	Day 1	Day 49	Evicted
13	Kumar	Day 7	Day 42	Evicted
14	Sujatha	Day 1	Day 35	Evicted
15	Gangavva	Day 1	Day 34	Walked
16	Swathi	Day 19	Day 28	Evicted
17	Devi	Day 1	Day 21	Evicted
18	Kalyani	Day 1	Day 14	Evicted
19	Surya	Day 1	Day 7	Evicted

== Housemates ==
The participants in the order of appearance as they entered in the house.

=== Original entrants ===
- Monal Gajjar – Indian film actress and a model. She appeared in Telugu, Hindi, Gujarati, Tamil, Malayalam and Marathi films.
- Surya Kiran – Indian director who works in Telugu language films. He is known for directing Satyam.
- Lasya Manjunath – Film actress, model, and a TV presenter. She worked in many Telugu television programs like Mondi Mogudu Penki Pellam, andMaa Voori Vanta.
- Abijeet Duddala – Indian film actor prominently working for Telugu film industry. He made his acting debut with the film Life Is Beautiful (2012)
- Jordaar Sujatha – News presenter in HMTV. She became famous with popular shows like Teenmaar vaarthalu, Jordhar Vaarthalu.
- Mehaboob Shaikh – YouTube personality, Dancer, TikTok Artist. He is known as "Mehaboob Dilse".
- Devi Nagavalli – News presenter, journalist for the popular Telugu news channel TV9. She became popular with her show Weekend live discussions.
- Alekhya Harika – YouTube personality dancer, film actress, model.
- Syed Sohel – Television actor. He is best known for his role in the Krishnaveni serial on Star Maa. He appeared in the movie Eureka
- Ariyana Glory – TV presenter, part of Gemini Comedy. She worked in well known channels like Studio Network and Sun TV Network.
- Amma Rajasekhar – Choreographer and Indian director. He predominantly works for the Telugu film industry.
- Karate Kalyani – Indian film actress and comedian. She is known for appearing in the film Chatrapathi (2005).
- Noel Sean – Playback singer, rapper, actor and composer working in the Indian Telugu film industry. He is the first rapper in the Tollywood industry.
- Divi Vadthya – Model and Indian film actress. She is known for her portrayal of Pooja's friend in the Telugu action-drama film Maharshi in 2019.
- Akhil Sarthak – Television actor. He is best known for his role in the Kalyani serial. He is the "Third Most Desirable Man" on Television.
- Gangavva – YouTube personality, Actor. She is best known for web series My Village Show Comedy with her grandson.

=== Wildcard entrants ===
- Kumar Sai – Film actor. He is best known for his role in films such as Ee Rojullo (2011) and Bus Stop (2012).
- Avinash – Film actor, comedian. He is best known for the Indian Telugu-language reality television comedy show Jabardasth.
- Swathi Deekshith – Film actress. She has worked in the Telugu, Bengali, and Tamil film industries. She is well known in Telugu films Jump Jilani and Ladies & Gentlemen.
