= W/O Ram =

- Directed by: Vijay Yelakanti
- Screenplay by: Vijay Yelankanti
- Story by: Vijay Yelakanti
- Produced by: T. G. Vishwa Prasad; Vivek Kuchibhotla
- Starring: Lakshmi Manchu; Samrat Reddy; Priyadarshi Pullikonda; Aadarsh Balakrishna
- Cinematography: Samala Bhasker
- Edited by: Tammiraju
- Music by: Raghu Dixit
- Production companies: People Media Factory; Manchu Entertainment
- Release date: 2018
- Country: India
- Language: Telugu

Wife of Ram is a 2018 Indian Telugu language psychological thriller film, produced by T. G. Vishwa Prasad and Vivek Kuchibhotla, under People Media Factory. It was directed by Vijay Yelakanti. It features Lakshmi Manchu and Samrat Reddy in the lead roles, along with Priyadarshi Pullikonda in a crucial role and Aadarsh Balakrishna as the main antagonist. Film's music and background score is composed by Raghu Dixit. The film was dubbed and released in Hindi on 22 November 2018 on YouTube.

The movie is about the journey of a woman to find justice and her struggle in modern society; incivility and outrageously monstrous behavior of others towards a woman.

== Plot ==
The film begins with Deeksha found lying on the ground near a pit called "selfie spot" with her husband. Upon being rushed to the hospital, her husband is pronounced dead. It is discovered that Deeksha was 6 months pregnant and has lost her baby due to the incident. She claims an unknown male had murdered her husband while the police dismiss the case due to the lack of enough evidence to find the murderer. Determined to find the truth, she decides to investigate on her own and doggedly gathers pieces of the case.

One day, the Senior Inspector, visibly not interested in Deeksha's case, hands over the case to Chari. Deeksha, meanwhile has investigated and visited the pub where Ram was seen with his friend Rocky, where it is seen in the pub's CCTV footage they had a fight. Chari is surprised to see Deeksha's investigation and decide help her. They first trick Rocky to call them back. Then they visit Rocky's home but find nothing. Deeksha later receives a call that her house has been ransacked.

Meanwhile, one night Deeksha is stabbed in the back but survives the attack. Rocky calls the Senior Inspector, who is in cahoots with Rocky and tells him to dismiss the case. When he approaches Deeksha, he is stunned to find her knowledge of the evidences against Rocky. He calls Rocky back and tells him that the case is getting more complicated. Chari, who was on leave for his engagement, meets and sees Deeksha injured. He then accuses Deeksha to take things too hastily. However, he suddenly feels sleepy and realises too late that his drink was spiked with sleeping pills. Deeksha apologises and assures him that "things will be done by the time he wakes up."

Deeksha then meets Rocky in a warehouse and confronts him about the disappearance of Ram. He is oblivious to the fact but that's not the case - Deeksha accuses him of rape and murder of her friend Sneha. Initially reluctant, Rocky then drops a bombshell that not only him, even Ram was too involved in the rape. Deeksha hears teary eyed as Rocky shamelessly confesses to them and dares her to "kill" her husband. At this point, even Deeksha springs up a surprise- SHE is the one who killed Ram. She had found about Ram's involvement in Sneha's case and threatened to go to the police. After an altercation she lost her child and subsequently killed Ram.

Rocky attacks Deeksha with a concealed gun, but she is hit on the shoulder and shoots Rocky to death with the gun stolen from the Senior Inspector who is also killed by her. A recovered Chari reaches the spot and covers up the scene. The film ends with Deeksha going in an ambulance, remembering how her uncle attempted to molest her and she punished him by making him slip in bathroom floor wet with soap water.

== Cast ==
- Lakshmi Manchu as Deeksha
- Samrat Reddy as Ram
- Priyadarshi Pullikonda as Police Officer Chary
- Aadarsh Balakrishna as Rocky
- Pawon Ramesh
- Aishwarya Reddy as unnamed neighbour
- Srushti Dange as an Escort
- Priyanka Nalkari as Sneha (cameo appearance)
