= Manasichi Choodu (TV series) =

Indian Telugu Television series

- Genre: Drama; Romance
- Based on: Eeramana Rojave
- Story by: Rasool
- Directed by: Rasool
- Starring: Keerthi Bhat; Mahesh Babu Kalidasu
- Country of origin: India
- Original language: Telugu
- No. of seasons: 1
- No. of episodes: 720

Production
- Producer: Swathi Balineni
- Cinematography: Renuka Kumar; K Shiva Raju
- Editors: Chanti; Palamadugu Mahidar
- Production company: Eventel

Original release
- Network: Star Maa
- Release: 14 October 2019 – 4 June 2022

Manasichi Choodu (transl. Give Love and See) is an Indian Telugu-language romantic drama television series that aired on Star Maa from Monday to Saturday since 14 October 2019. It stars Keerthi Bhat and Mahesh Babu Kalidasu. The main plot of the series was taken from Eeramana Rojave season 1.

== Synopsis ==
Ashok and Bhanu love each other, despite belonging to rival families. They try to convince their families for their marriage. After some consequences Ashok dies in an accident. Everyone blames Bhanu for Ashok's death and insult her by seeing her as a bad omen who took the life of Ashok by claiming to be in love with him. A turn of fate forces Bhanu to marry Aadi, who is the younger brother of Ashok. Initially they both don't get along well with each other, but slowly Bhanu starts admiring Aadi because of his caring nature. Later, both of them fall in love with each other. Meanwhile, Bhanu's sister Renu is stalked and harassed by Bhanu and Renu's cousin Siddappa. Siddappa wants to marry Renu to seek revenge on her father Nagineedu. Soon Siddappa gets exposed which leads to her father Nagineedu suffer a heart attack and he asks Renu to marry Aadi's younger brother Suri. At that very moment, Renu and Suri forcefully get married in front of everyone. All this while, Renu already had slight feelings for Suri but Suri hates her because she previously misunderstood and hated him. He only married Renu because of their both families' pressure. He still continues to hate Renu even after their wedding.

After a lot of turn of events, Bhanu and Aadi separate due to some rifts and misunderstandings. Bhanu leaves Aadi and her in-laws house after being insulted and wrongly accused of pushing Tirumala off-the-roof leading him to coma. She then goes to her parents' home. She now moves to a new city along with her family for work and starts a new life there, working in a company. Similarly, Aadi moves to a new city for work along with his family. They unknowingly bump into each other after a few years, where they both accidentally work in the same company. They continue to hate each other for each other's past mistakes which led to their separation. Both of their families live in opposite homes to each other and they continue to dislike one another. Bhanu and Aadi go through the turmoil of their past and present lives every day. The further story will tell if, when and how will Bhanu and Aadi reunite.

== Cast ==
=== Main cast ===
- Keerthi Bhat as Bhanumathi a.k.a. Bhanu: Nagineedu and Parvathi's eldest daughter, Ashok's ex-fiancé and lover, Aadi's wife, Renu and Chinni's elder sister, Tirumala and Padma's eldest daughter in-law, Suri's sister-in-law, Chandra's stepsister in-law. (2019—2022)
- Mahesh Babu Kalidasu as Aadi: Padma and Tirumala Rayudu's second son, Ashok's younger brother, Suri's elder brother, Chandra's first stepbrother, Bhanu's husband, Renu's brother-in-law, Divya's ex-lover. (2019—2022)

=== Recurring ===
- Maanas Nagulapalli as Ashok (Dead): Bhanu's ex-fiancé and lover, Padma and Tirumala Rayudu's first son, Aadi and Suri's elder brother, Chandra's stepbrother. (2019)
- Chatrapathi Sekhar as Nagineedu: Bhanu, Renu and Chinni's father, Parvathi's husband.
- Srinivas as Tirumala Rayudu: Ashok, Aadi, Suri and Chandra's father, Padma's husband, Bhanu and Renu's father-in-law.
  - Gemini Srinivas as Tirumala Rayudu.
- Padma as Padma: Tirumala Rayudu's second wife, Ashok, Aadi and Suri's mother, Chandra's stepmother, Bhanu and Renu's mother in law.
  - Anusha Rao as Padma. (2019—2020)
- Yashwanth Kanigiri as Suri: Padma and Tirumala Rayudu's third son, Ashok and Aadi's younger brother, Chandra's second step brother, Renu's husband, Bhanu's brother-in-law.
  - Dinil Rahul as Suri
- Trisha Dantala as Renu: Suri's wife, Bhanu and Chinni's sister, Nagineedu and Parvathi's second daughter, Tirumala Rayudu and Padma's youngest daughter in law.
- Anusha as Chandrakala a.k.a. Chandra: Tirumala Rayudu's daughter with his first wife, Ashok, Aadi and Suri's step sister, Padma's stepdaughter, Bhanu and Renu's stepsister in-law.
  - Anitha as Chandrakala.
- Alapati Lakshmii as Jayamma: Tirumala Rayudu's mother.
- Prabhavathi Varma as Nagamani: Nagineedu's sister, Siddappa's mother.
- Bhavya as Chinni: Nagineedu and Parvathi's third daughter, Bhanu and Renu's younger sister.
- Sravanthi as Parvathi: Nagineedu's wife, Bhanu, Renu and Chinni's mother, Aadi and Suri's mother in law.
- Shabeena as Divya: Aadi's ex-lover and best friend.
- Tribhuvan Reddy as Siddappa: Nagamani's son.
- Chidham Srinivas as Vasu: Chandrakala's husband.
- Naveena Mahesh as Srivalli.
- Swapna as Prema: Aadi and Bhanu's colleague, Prithviraj's office staff.
- Hritesh Avasthy as Prithviraj: Aadi and Bhanu's boss.
- Sri Priya as Sandhya: Surrogate mother for Aadi and Bhanu's child.
- Kolli Praveen Chandra as Babji: Sandhya's husband.
- Prathyusha as Lawyer.
- Marakala Srinu as Aadi's friend.
- Devraj Sunny as Shiva
