= Star Maa =

Indian Telugu -language television channel

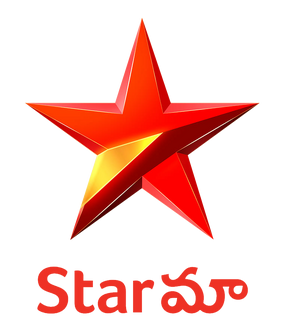
- Logo used since 2020
- Country: India
- Broadcast area: Asia
- Network: JioStar
- Headquarters: Hyderabad, Telangana, India

Programming
- Language: Telugu
- Picture format: 1080p HDTV

Ownership
- Owner: JioStar
- Key people: Maa tv
- Sister channels: Star Maa Gold; Star Maa Movies; Star Maa Music; JioStar channels

History
- Launched: 10 April 2002; 24 years ago
- Former names: Maa TV (2002–2017)

Links
- Website: Star Maa on JioHotstar Star Maa on YouTube

Availability

Streaming media
- JioHotstar: In India only
- YouTube: In India only

Star Maa is an Indian Telugu-language general entertainment pay television channel owned by JioStar, a joint venture between Viacom18 and Disney India. It primarily telecasts programmes such as serials, reality shows and Telugu films.

== History ==
Penmetsa Murali Krishnam Raju founded MAA Television Network in 2001 as a corporate entity. Its flagship TV channel, MAA TV was launched in April 2002. The channel started off as a pay channel with 18 hours of programming a day. An initial investment of ₹25 crore was made into the venture. D. Rajendra Prasad, a veteran of Telugu television business associated with Citi Cable, was also reportedly a co-promoter of the company. As of 2003, Murali Krishnam Raju owned 70% of the company.

In March 2006, Nimmagadda Prasad along with film stars Chiranjeevi and Nagarjuna became promoters by purchasing 60% stake worth ₹40 crore. After the revised capital structure, the three of them acquired equal stake in the channel. Founder Murali Krishna Raju's holding came down to 20% after the restructuring.

The company's second channel, MAA Music, was launched on 30 May 2008. On 4 February 2011, Maa TV Network launched two new channels, Maa Movies and Maa Junior with content focused on movies and children respectively. Coinciding with the occasion, film actor Ram Charan was inducted as a Director on the board of the company.

On 9 April 2012, an official announcement was made by Sony Pictures and Maa Television Network that the former would be picking up 30 percent of stake in the latter, subject to necessary approvals. However, the deal did not materialize.

In February 2015, Star India acquired broadcast business of MAA Television Network for an estimated price of ₹2,000–2,500 crore. At the time of acquisition, Nimmagadda Prasad had 65 percent stake in the company, Chiranjeevi and his family owned 20 percent, and Nagarjuna 10 percent.

On 13 February 2017, Maa TV was rebranded as Star Maa with a new logo before the start of the Meelo Evaru Koteeswarudu Season 4. In June 2017, her sister channel, Maa Movies, Maa Music and Maa Gold were also rebranded into Star Maa Movies, Star Maa Music and Star Maa Gold. On 6 September 2020, Star Maa introduced a new logo during the reality show Bigg Boss Telugu Season 4 Grand Launch.

== Sister channels ==
=== Star Maa Movies ===
Star Maa Movies is an Indian Telugu language movie pay television channel owned by JioStar a Joint Venture between Viacom18 and Disney India. It primarily telecasts Telugu movies with Dolby digital audio format.

=== Star Maa Gold ===
Star Maa Gold is an Indian Telugu language movie pay television channel owned by JioStar a Joint Venture between Viacom18 and Disney India. It telecasts Telugu movies. It usually airs old Telugu movies. The channel was launched with its sister channel Star Maa Movies in 2011. Formally launched as Maa Junior its name was later changed in 2012 to Maa Gold.

=== Star Maa Music ===
Star Maa Music is a Telugu language music pay television channel owned by JioStar a Joint Venture between Viacom18 and Disney India It was launched in 2008. It is the only Music channel currently operated by JioStar.

== Award functions ==
=== CineMAA Awards ===
Maa TV presents the CineMAA Awards to Tollywood personalities every year. The trophy was designed by Neil Foley Designs.

=== Star Maa Parivaar Awards ===
Awards from the television serials were started presenting from 2017 onward with this name, every year best serials were nominated and present awards to them

== Reception ==
The channel is one of the most watched top five Telugu GECs. As of 2010, it remained the third most watched Telugu GEC. In the last quarter of 2014, Maa TV overtook Gemini TV to become the leader.

Since 2017, the viewership of the channel started to have a great jump and it consistently became the most watched Telugu GEC after the launch of Bigg Boss Telugu with a record viewership and GRPs not garnered by any Telugu GEC. In week 26 while it had 529 GRPs in week 28, it jumped to 828. While as in week 28, it was at third position, in week 29, it became the most watched Telugu GEC. In week 34 of 2018, it became the third most watched Indian Television channel with 936 GRPs. In week 30 of 2019, it garnered its highest GRP of 1108 being third most watched Indian channel.
