= Raju Gari Gadhi (film series) =

Raju Gari Gadhi series
- Directed by: Ohmkar
- Written by: Dialogues: Sai Madhav Burra (RGG 1 & RGG 3); Abburi Ravi (RGG 2)
- Screenplay by: Ohmkar
- Story by: Ohmkar (RGG 1 & RGG 2); Ranjith Sankar (RGG 2); Rambhala (RGG 3)
- Produced by: Sai Korrapati (RGG 1); Prasad V. Potluri (RGG 2); Kalyan Chakravarthy (RGG 3)
- Cinematography: S. Gnanam (RGG 1); R. Diwakaran (RGG 2); Chota K. Naidu (RGG 3)
- Edited by: Nagaraju (RGG 1); Madhu (RGG 2); Gautam Raju (RGG 3)
- Music by: Sai Karthik (RGG 1); S. Thaman (RGG 2); Shabir (RGG 3)
- Production companies: RGG 1 Varahi Chalana Chitram; AK Entertainments; Oak Entertainments; RGG 2 PVP Cinema; Matinee Entertainment; Oak Entertainments; RGG 3 Oak Entertainmments
- Release dates: 16 October 2015 (1); 13 October 2017 (2); 18 October 2019 (3)
- Country: India
- Language: Telugu
- Budget: ₹32–33 crore
- Box office: ₹65.79 crore

Raju Gari Gadhi (transl. King's bedroom), also known as RGG, is a series of Indian Telugu-language comedy horror films created and directed by Ohmkar. While the first film Raju Gari Gadhi (2015) is an original plot, Raju Gari Gadhi 2 (2017) and Raju Gari Gadhi 3 (2019) are remakes of Pretham (2016) and Dhilluku Dhuddu 2 (2019), respectively.

Ohmkar's brother, Ashwin Babu, who played the character "Ashwin" in all three films, is the only actor to appear in each film of the series. The first film opened in 2015 to mixed reviews but was commercially successful. This led Ohmkar to continue the film series.

== Films ==
=== Raju Gari Gadhi/RGG 1 ===
The film is jointly produced by Varahi Chalana Chitram, AK Entertainments Pvt. Ltd and OAK Entertainments Pvt. Ltd. The film received mixed reviews but it was commercially successful. The film revolves around TV channel plan to host a reality show in a haunted house near Nandigama. Dead bodies of 34 people have resurfaced there for over a period of time. Seven individuals namely, Ashwin (Ashwin Babu), Nandu (Chethan Cheenu), Barbie (Eshanya), Bala Tripura Sundari (Dhanya Balakrishna), Shivudu (Dhanraj), M Y Danam (Shankar) and Bujjimma (Vidyullekha Raman) are selected for the show. Program head Pakoddi (Prabhas Sreenu) and Chekodi (Raghu Babu) have arranged all kinds of scares for the contestants. The rest of the story revolves about what incidents, the individuals face as the show progress and find the truth of that hanuted house.

=== Raju Gari Gadhi 2/RGG 2 ===
It is the remake of the 2016 Malayalam film Pretham. Although the film received negative reviews, it is commercially successful. The film features three friends – Ashwin (Ashwin Babu), Kishore (Vennela Kishore), and Praveen (Praveen), who are friends from college days, deciding to lead a life by investing in a resort business. As they start the business, everything goes smoothly until they begin to witness paranormal activities in the resort, making their lives tougher. Immediately, they contact a nearby Church Father (Naresh), but it fails miserably, and their fear of that ghost increases. The Father suggests them to approach a world-renowned mentalist named Rudra (Nagarjuna Akkineni) who has parlor tricks and more. Rudra decides to solve out the mystery in the resort. Beyond a shadow of the doubt, he finds out that it is a soul of a girl Amrutha (Samantha Akkineni), who is seeking answers for her death. Rudra ensures Amrutha that he will definitely help her. So, she starts revealing her past.

=== Raju Gari Gadhi 3/ RGG3 ===
It is the remake of 2019 Tamil film Dhilluku Dhuddu 2. This film too received mixed reviews. Ashwin (Ashwin Babu) and his maternal uncle (Ali) are happy-go-lucky guys who create a nuisance for their neighbours due to their drunken antics. The neighbours try out different methods to escape their antics, but in vain. One of the neighbours, who is a doctor by profession, comes across Maya (Avika Gor), whom he is in love with. However, when he tries to express his love, he is beaten black and blue by a mysterious ghost. After finding out details about Maya and the ghost, the doctor and other neighbours plot against Ashwin to make him fall in love with Maya and let the ghost take care of him. Injured in a fight, Ashwin, seeking a physiotherapist's help, and him falling in love with Maya was engineered by his neighbours. Things take a twist, and Ashwin is thrashed by the ghost. He finds out that Maya's father Garudaraja Bhattadhri is a powerful magician in Kerala and that he had set the ghost to protect Maya. He sets out to Kerala to convince Maya's father, along with his uncle. They insult Bhattadhri, and he sets out to do a pooja to harm them. To escape that, they ask for Chakra Mahadevi's help. It turns out that both Bhattadhri and Mahadevi are fake and that there is a real ghost protecting Maya. They go to a black magician, where he reveals the flashback about the ghost. The rest of the story revolves around how they solve the problem.

== Cast ==
=== Raju Gari Gadhi ===
- Ashwin Babu as Ashwin
- Chethan Cheenu as Dr. Nandan / Nandu
- Dhanya Balakrishna as Bala Tripura Sundari / Bala
- Dhanraj as Shivudu
- Rajiv Kanakala as Dr. Karthik
- Posani Krishna Murali as Bommali Raja
- Saptagiri as "Race Gurram" Babji
- Shakalaka Shankar as M Y Danam
- Poorna as Bommali
- Vidyullekha Raman as Bujjimma
- Eshanya Maheshwari as Barbie
- Raghu Babu as Chekodi
- Prabhas Sreenu as Pakoddi
- Jeeva

=== Raju Gari Gadhi 2 ===
- Ashwin Babu as Ashwin
- Nagarjuna Akkineni as Rudra
- Samantha Ruth Prabhu as Amrutha
- Seerat Kapoor as Suhanisa
- Abhinaya as Kiran
- Rao Ramesh as Parandhamaiah
- Vennela Kishore as Kishore
- Praveen as Praveen
- Vidyullekha Raman as Bellam Sridevi
- Naresh as Father
- Avinash as Priest
- Devan as Vice Chancellor Chandra Shekar
- Nandu as Nandu
- Tejaswi Madivada as Bala
- Narayana Rao as Master
- Annapurna as Varalakshmi
- Satya Krishnan as Lecturer
- Mukhtar Khan as Commissioner Sarathchandra
- Ravi Varma as Satti
- Shakalaka Shankar as Bala Yesu
- Geetha Singh as Nimmy
- Baby Lasya as Amrutha (child)
- Shatru as a goon

=== Raju Gari Gadhi 3 ===
- Ashwin Babu as Ashwin
- Avika Gor as Maya
- Urvashi as Rajamatha
- Ali
- Brahmaji
- Ajay Ghosh as Garudaraja Bhattadhri
- Prabhas Sreenu
- Hari Teja
- K. Sivasankar
- Dhanraj
- Getup Srinu
- Sneha Gupta - Item Girl 1 (" Naa Gadhiloki Ra ")
- Radhika S Mayadev - Item Girl 2 ( " Naa Gadhiloki Ra")

== Crew ==
Occupation	Film		
Occupation	Raju Gari Gadhi (2015)	Raju Gari Gadhi 2 (2017)	Raju Gari Gadhi 3 (2019)
Director	Ohmkar	Ohmkar	Ohmkar
Producer(s)	Sai Korrapati	Prasad V. Potluri	Kalyan Chakravarthy
Story writer (s)	Ohmkar	Ranjith Sankar Ohmkar	Rambhala
Screenplay writer (s)	Ohmkar	Ohmkar	Ohmkar
Dialogue writer(s)	Sai Madhav Burra	Abburi Ravi	Sai Madhav Burra
Song Composer(s)	Sai Karthik	S. Thaman	Shabir
Background Score	Sai Karthik	S. Thaman	Shabir
Director of photography	S. Gnanam	R. Diwakaran	Chota K. Naidu
Editor(s)	Nagaraj	Madhu	Gautam Raju
Art Director(s)	Sahi Suresh	A.S. Prakash	Sahi Suresh
Stunt co-ordinator (s)	Venkat	Vijay	Venkat
Choreographer(s)	Sekhar	Vijay Prakash	Sekhar

== Release and revenue ==
Film	Release date	Budget	Box office revenue
Raju Gari Gadhi	16 October 2015	₹3 crore (US$310,000)	₹18 crore (US$1.9 million)
Raju Gari Gadhi 2	13 October 2017	₹25 crore (US$2.6 million)	₹35.65 crore (US$3.7 million)
Raju Gari Gadhi 3	18 October 2019	₹4 crore (US$420,000)–₹5 crore (US$520,000)	₹12.14 crore (US$1.3 million)
Total		₹32 crore (US$3.4 million)–₹33 crore (US$3.5 million) (three films)	₹65.79 crore (US$6.9 million)(three films)
