= Sixth Sense (game show) =

Indian television reality game show

- Genre: Reality game
- Created by: Ohmkar
- Presented by: Ohmkar
- Country of origin: India
- Original language: Telugu
- No. of seasons: 5
- No. of episodes: 127

Production
- Production location: Hyderabad, India
- Camera setup: Multi-camera
- Running time: 45–60 minutes.
- Production company: OAK Entertainments

Original release
- Network: Star Maa
- Release: 31 March 2018 – 10 June 2023

Sixth Sense was an Indian Telugu-language reality game show created and hosted by Ohmkar. The show started airing on 31 March 2018 on Star Maa. It is produced by OAK Entertainments house. The five seasons of the show aired on every Saturday and Sunday at 9 p.m. onwards.

A total of five seasons with 127 episodes were aired. It has been in sync with the schedule of Bigg Boss for a few seasons.

== Format ==
The show format is considered to be a first of its kind show involving the unique senses of humans and explore their thinking abilities with minutely orchestrated nuances between the host and participating celebrities. Sight, taste, hearing, smell and touch are the typically recognized human senses. The game demands the contestants to make a guess based on their instinct and they will be rewarded if their decision is right.

== Production ==
In an interview to The Times of India, Ohmkar said " just couldn’t find time for it, so it did not materialise. Initially, we thought of going ahead with a tried and tested format but after the success of Raju Gari Gadhi and its sequel, I knew the audience will expect something different. So, I decided to do something yet simple. That’s how I hit upon the concept of Sixth Sense. I would also like to mention the DoP, R. Diwakaran, a key factor behind the show."

== Series overview ==
Series	Host	Episodes	Originally released		
Series	Host	Episodes	First released	Last released	Network
1	Ohmkar	21	31 March 2018	9 June 2018	Star Maa
2	Ohmkar	30	8 December 2018	17 March 2019	Star Maa
3	Ohmkar	31	9 November 2019	22 February 2020	Star Maa
4	Ohmkar	24	12 June 2021	29 August 2021	Star Maa
5	Ohmkar	21	1 April 2023	10 June 2023	Star Maa

== Season 1 ==
Sixth Sense
- Season 1
- Presented by: Ohmkar
- No. of episodes: 21

Release
- Original network: Star Maa
- Original release: 31 March – 9 June 2018

Season chronology
- Next → Season 2

The show was announced in March 2018 by Ohmkar and Star Maa.

=== Format ===
Round no.	Round name	Concept
1	Sight	Four visuals (short video clips) are screened, questions are asked based on the visuals. Participants A and B need to answer/guess as many as questions they can. Each question/visual has a value of 100 marks. Whoever answers correctly between them, will get the marks. If both of the A and B participants have same score, then there will be a Tie-break (one more visual or an image for 15 seconds will be screened). The top-scorer is qualified to play the "Sixth Sense Challenge."
2	Sound	Four songs will played (sung) by a lady (the lady is genearally, a foreigner who doesn't understand Telugu. She will be singing the song by listening the song played from her headset). Each song is valued for 100 marks. Whoever sound their respective horn, will be given chance to answer/sing the song. If both of the A and B participants have same score, then there will be a Tie-break (one more song is played/sung). Participant with maximum marks is qualified to play the "Sixth Sense Challenge."
3	Taste; Smell; Touch	Three objects/products are placed. Participants A and B will be blindfolded. They need to identify each of them accordingly, using their senses of Taste, Smell and Touch in a time period of 45 seconds.

==== Sixth Sense Challenge ====
- Round–1 : Top-scorer of the first round will play the challenge. Three bikes are placed and the participant will be given a single key, by which he/she need to guess the suitable bike. If they matches the key and bike correctly, then they can take away the bike.
- Round–2 : Three large golden eggs are hanged, out of which, two eggs are empty and the remaining contains one-and-half lakh rupees worth Gold. The top-scorer of the second round will be given two chances, in which he/she need to break only the empty eggs. If he/she breaks the golden egg that contains gold, then they will lose the challenge.
- Round–3 : Six lockers, each containing ₹10, ₹100, ₹1000, ₹10,000, ₹1,00,000 and 10,00,000 are placed. The top-scorer need to open five of the six lockers. Amount contained in the remained (sixth) locker will be awarded to them.

=== Participants ===
Episode	Air date	Participant(s) A	Participant(s) B
1	31 March 2018	Rohini Noni	Ravi
2	1 April 2018	Rajeev Kanakala	Suma Kanakala
3	7 April 2018	Hyper Aadi	Chalaki Chanti
4	8 April 2018	Sekhar	Mumaith Khan
5	14 April 2018	Kathi Mahesh	Babu Gogineni
6	15 April 2018	Aadarsh Balakrishna	Prince Cecil
7	21 April 2018	Hari Teja	Getup Srinu
8	22 April 2018	Tejaswi Madivada	Eesha Rebba
9	28 April 2018	Dhanraj	Satya
10	29 April 2018	Vishnupriya	Varshini Sounderajan
11	5 May 2018	Chandrabose	Mangli
12	6 May 2018	Racha Ravi, Ram Prasad	Ritika Singh, Apoorva
13	12 May 2018	Diksha Panth	Sudigali Sudheer
14	13 May 2018	Shyamala	Geetha Madhuri
15	19 May 2018	Noel Sean	Sanjjanaa Galrani
16	20 May 2018	Sreemukhi	L. V. Revanth
17	26 May 2018	Lasya Manjunath	Venu Yeldandi
18	27 May 2018	Namitha	Veerendra Chowdary
19	2 June 2018	Ali	Anasuya Bharadwaj
20	3 June 2018	Mahesh	Naresh
21	9 June 2018	Siva Balaji	Madhumitha

== Season 2 ==
Sixth Sense
- Season 2
- Presented by: Ohmkar
- No. of episodes: 30

Release
- Original network: Star Maa
- Original release: 8 December 2018 – 30 March 2019

Season chronology
- ← Previous; Season 1 Next → Season 3

The second season is all set for a premiere from 8 December 2018 onwards.

=== Format ===
Round no.	Round name	Concept
1	Sight	Four visuals (short video clips) are screened, questions are asked based on the visuals. Participants A and B need to answer/guess as many as questions they can. Each question/visual has a value of 100 marks. Whoever answers correctly between them, will get the marks. To answer, both of A and B participants need to make a similar sound of their choice for four visuals. If both of the A and B participants have same score, then there will be a Tie-break (one more visual or an image for 15 seconds will be screened). The top-scorer is qualified to play the "Sixth Sense Challenge."
2	Sound	Four songs will played (sung) by a lady (the lady is genearally, a foreigner who doesn't understand Telugu. She will be singing the song by listening the song played from her headset). Each song is valued for 100 marks. Whoever sound their respective horn, will be given chance to answer/sing the song. If both of the A and B participants have same score, then there will be a Tie-break (one more song is played/sung). Participant with maximum marks is qualified to play the "Sixth Sense Challenge."
3	Intelligence	Two artificial bombs are placed with four wired connections. Participants A and B need to cut any three connected wires simultaneously. One of them will blow the artificial bomb. Whoever, cuts the three correct wires are the winners of the round. If both the A and B participants cut the wires equally, then there will be a Tie-break (a coin written "Yes" and "No" on two sides, is tossed. Whoever wins the toss is the final winner).

==== Sixth Sense Challenge ====
- Round–1 : Top-scorer of the first round will play the challenge. Three bikes are placed and the participant will be given a single key, by which he/she need to guess the suitable bike. If they matches the key and bike correctly, then they can take away the bike.
- Round–2 : Three large golden eggs are hanged, out of which, two eggs are empty and the remaining contains one-and-half lakh rupees worth Gold. The top-scorer of the second round will be given two chances, in which he/she need to break only the empty eggs. If he/she breaks the golden egg that contains gold, then they will lose the challenge.
- Round–3 : Six lockers, each containing ₹10, ₹100, ₹1000, ₹10,000, ₹1,00,000 and 10,00,000 are placed. The top-scorer need to open five of the six lockers. Amount contained in the remained (sixth) locker will be awarded to them.

=== Participants ===
Episode	Air date	Participant(s) A	Participant(s) B
1	8 December 2018	Geetha Madhuri, Nandu	Pooja, Amit Tiwari
2	9 December 2018	Kajal Aggarwal	Mehreen Pirzada
3	15 December 2018	Jani	Raghu
4	16 December 2018	Tanish, Deepthi Sunaina	N. Deepthi, Samrat
5	22 December 2018	Sampoornesh Babu	Bhanu Sri
6	23 December 2018	Rashmi Gautam	Archana Shastry
7	29 December 2018	Raising Raju, Shanti Swaroop	Apparao, Vinodini
8	30 December 2018	Naresh	Prince Cecil
9	5 January 2019	Prudhvi Raj	Praveen
10	6 January 2019	Satya Krishna	Jhansi
11	12 January 2019	Jackie, Haritha	Prabhakar, Malayaja
12	13 January 2019	Anil Ravipudi	Tamannaah, Mehreen Pirzada
13	19 January 2019	Roll Rida	Ravi
14	20 January 2019	Getup Srinu	Ram Prasad
15	26 January 2019	Hari Teja	Vidyullekha Raman
16	27 January 2019	Pradeep Machiraju	Anasuya Bharadwaj
17	2 February 2019	Nirupam, Archana	Preetham, Harshita
18	3 February 2019	Bullet Bhaskar, G. Sudhakar	Rocket Raghava, Kiraak R. P.
19	9 February 2019	Ravikiran, Sushma	Indraneel, Meghana
20	10 February 2019	Dhanraj	Sreemukhi
21	16 February 2019	Priyadarshi, Swetha Varma	Aditi Myakal, Gayatri Gupta
22	17 February 2019	Sekhar	Poorna
23	23 February 2019	Prabhas Sreenu, Raghu	Karate Kalyani, Hema
24	24 February 2019	Navdeep	Tejaswi Madivada
25	2 March 2019	Madhusudhan, Ashika Gopal	Aiswarya, Ambati Arjun
26	3 March 2019	Madhu Shalini	Priyanka Jawalkar
27	9 March 2019	Kathhi Kartika, Jyothi	Madhu Priya, Sameer Hasan
28	10 March 2019	Sudigali Sudheer	Hyper Aadi
29	29 March 2019	Niharika Konidela	Rahul Vijay
30	30 March 2019	Kaushal Manda	Diksha Panth

== Season 3 ==
Sixth Sense
- Season 3
- Presented by: Ohmkar
- No. of episodes: 31

Release
- Original network: Star Maa
- Original release: 9 November 2019 – 22 February 2020

Season chronology
- ← Previous; Season 2 Next → Season 4

The TV host turned film maker Ohmkar is back to the small screen with the third season of popular game show Sixth Sense is all set for a premiere on 9 November 2019 onwards.

=== Format ===
Round no.	Round name	Concept
1	Sight	Four visuals (short video clips) are screened, questions are asked based on the visuals. Participants A and B need to answer/guess as many as questions they can. Each question/visual has a value of 100 marks. Whoever answers correctly between them, will get the marks. To answer, both of A and B participants need to make a similar sound of their choice for four visuals. If both of the A and B participants have same score, then there will be a Tie-break (one more visual or an image for 15 seconds will be screened). The top-scorer is qualified to play the "Sixth Sense Challenge."
2	Sound	Four songs will played (sung) by a lady (the lady is genearally, a foreigner who doesn't understand Telugu. She will be singing the song by listening the song played from her headset). Each song is valued for 100 marks. Whoever sound their respective horn, will be given chance to answer/sing the song. If both of the A and B participants have same score, then there will be a Tie-break (one more song is played/sung). Participant with maximum marks is qualified to play the "Sixth Sense Challenge."
3	Intelligence	Three artificial bombs (each with two cables) are placed on either sides of participants A and B, thus making the total of artificial bombs as six. In each artificial bomb, there is a danger cable (which blows the bomb) and a safe cable (which doesn't blow the bomb). Whoever unwires maximum (three) safe cables of each artificial bomb are qualified to play the "Sixth Sense Challenge."

==== Sixth Sense Challenge ====
- Round–1 : Two bikes are placed. The top-scorer can get any one of the bikes he wish. To win the bike, he/she need to play a game "Shoot Out". (Shoot Out game : Three cases, each containing two dummy guns (silver and black) are placed. In each case, one dummy gun is loaded and the other one is unloaded/empty. Participant need to shoot out a loaded dummy gun, by choosing any one of the two dummy guns in the three cases. Each shoot out has a value of one point. Participant need to score a minimum of two points.)
- Round–2 : Three large golden eggs are hanged, out of which, two eggs are empty and the remaining contains one-and-half lakh rupees worth Gold. The top-scorer of the second round will be given two chances, in which he/she need to break only the empty eggs. If he/she breaks the golden egg that contains gold, then they will lose the challenge.
- Round–3 : Six lockers, each containing ₹10, ₹100, ₹1000, ₹10,000, ₹1,00,000 and 10,00,000 are placed. The top-scorer need to open five of the six lockers. Amount contained in the remained (sixth) locker will be awarded to them.

=== Participants ===
Episode	Air date	Participant(s) A	Participant(s) B
1	9 November 2019	Jhansi, Satyam Rajesh	Praveen, Srinivasa Reddy
2	10 November 2019	Suma Kanakala	Lakshmi Manchu
3	16 November 2019	Mano	Kalpana Raghavendar
4	17 November 2019	Brahmaji	Ali
5	23 November 2019		
6	24 November 2019	Ravi Krishna, Siva Jyothi	Himaja, Rohini
7	30 November 2019	Varun Sandesh, Vithika Sheru	Punarnavi, Rahul Sipligunj
8	1 December 2019	Nikhil Siddharth	Lavanya Tripathi
9	7 December 2019	Sudigali Sudheer	Hyper Aadi
10	8 December 2019	Ravi	Ali Reza
11	14 December 2019	Nandita Swetha	Avika Gor
12	15 December 2019	Hemachandra, Sravana Bhargavi	Krishna Chaitanya, Mrudula
13	21 December 2019	Sreemukhi	Getup Srinu
14	22 December 2019	Maruthi, Raashi Khanna	Sai Dharam Tej, Suhas
15	28 December 2019	Rashmi Gautam	Poorna
16	29 December 2019	Hari Teja	Mumaith Khan
17	4 January 2020	Vishwak Sen, Abhinav Gomatam	Tharun, Priyadarshi
18	5 January 2020	Gangavva, Vitta Mahesh	Harika, Jaanu
19	11 January 2020	Prabhakar, Shravan, Raj	Sujitha, Maheshwari, Priyanka
20	12 January 2020	Rashmika, Devi Sri Prasad	Anil Ravipudi, Sangeetha
21	18 January 2020	Lasya, Varshini Sounderajan	Dhanraj, Kiraak R. P.
22	19 January 2020	Geetha Madhuri, Nandu	
23	25 January 2020		
24	26 January 2020	Navya, Sohel	Priyanka, Shivakumar Marihal
25	1 February 2020		
26	2 February 2020	Rajeev Kanakala	Sunil
27	8 February 2020	Raj Tarun	Hebah Patel
28	9 February 2020		
29	15 February 2020	Ramprasad, Mahesh	Bullet Bhaskar, Rajamouli
30	16 February 2020	Sahrudha, Krithika	Naresh, Yodha
31	22 February 2020	Ashmita Karnani, Bhagyam	Indraja, Ambika

== Season 4 ==
Sixth Sense
- Season 4
- Presented by: Ohmkar
- No. of episodes: 24

Release
- Original network: Star Maa
- Original release: 12 June – 29 August 2021

Season chronology
- ← Previous; Season 3 Next → Season 5

Ohmkar-hosted Sixth Sense fourth season is set to return to the small screen on 12 June 2021 onwards.

=== Format ===
Round no.	Round name	Concept
1	Sight	Five visuals (short video clips) are screened, questions are asked based on the visuals. Participants A and B need to answer/guess as many as questions they can. Each question/visual has a value of 100 marks. Whoever answers correctly between them, will get the marks. To answer, both of A and B participants need to make a similar sound of their choice for four visuals. If both of the A and B participants have same score, then there will be a Tie-break (one more visual or an image for 15 seconds will be screened). The top-scorer is qualified to play the "Sixth Sense Challenge."
2	Sound	Five songs will played (sung) by a lady (the lady is genearally, a foreigner who doesn't understand Telugu. She will be singing the song by listening the song played from her headset). Each song is valued for 100 marks. Whoever sound their respective horn, will be given chance to answer/sing the song. If both of the A and B participants have same score, then there will be a Tie-break (one more song is played/sung). Participant with maximum marks is qualified to play the "Sixth Sense Challenge."
3	Touch	Four products are placed on a table. Participants A and B need to guess the weight of each product simultaneously. Whoever, guesses the exact/accurate or approximate weight, gets 100 marks for each product. Participant with maximum marks is qualified to play the "Sixth Sense Challenge."

==== Sixth Sense Challenge ====
- Round–1 : In the first round, the top-scorer need to play any one of the challenges, i.e. "Gun Shot" or "Guess the Switch".
  Gun Shot : Two bikes are placed. The top-scorer can get any one of the bikes he wish. To win the bike, he/she need to play a game "Shoot Out". (Shoot Out game : Three cases, each containing two dummy guns (silver and black) are placed. In each case, one dummy gun is loaded and the other one is unloaded/empty. Participant need to shoot out a loaded dummy gun, by choosing any one of the two dummy guns in the three cases. Each shoot out has a value of one point. Participant need to score a minimum of two points.)
  Guess the Switch : Five products/appliances are placed. Five switch boards (each with two switches and a bulb connected to the pair of switches) which are connected to the products are also placed near the products/appliances. The top-scorer of the first round need to light up the bulb connected to the respective product by pressing the correct switch (of the two switches connected to the bulb). Top-scorer need to switch on as many as bulbs, such that they can win as many as products/appliances.
- Round–2 : Three large golden eggs are hanged, out of which, two eggs are empty and the remaining contains one lakh rupees worth Gold. The top-scorer of the second round will be given two chances, in which he/she need to break only the empty eggs. If he/she breaks the golden egg that contains gold, then they will lose the challenge.
- Round–3 : Six lockers, each containing ₹10, ₹100, ₹1000, ₹10,000, ₹1,00,000 and 10,00,000 are placed. The top-scorer need to open five of the six lockers. Amount contained in the remained (sixth) locker will be awarded to them.

=== Participants ===
Episode	Air date	Participant(s) A	Participant(s) B
1	12 June 2021	Hyper Aadi	Anasuya Bharadwaj
2	13 June 2021	Syed Sohel, Mehaboob Shaikh	Alekhya Harika, Ariyana Glory
3	19 June 2021	Avika Gor	Poorna
4	20 June 2021	Sekhar	Sreemukhi
5	26 June 2021	Team Express Hari from Comedy Stars	Team Saddam from Comedy Stars
6	27 June 2021	Ali	Sangeetha Krish
7	3 July 2021	Team Kasthuri Serial	Team Guppedantha Manasu Serial
8	4 July 2021	Akhil Sarthak	Divi Vadthya
9	10 July 2021	Anne Master	Baba Bhaskar
10	11 July 2021	Bandla Ganesh	Nandita Swetha
11	17 July 2021	Team Devatha Serial	Team Janaki Kalaganaledu Serial
12	18 July 2021	Rashmi Gautam	Varshini Sounderajan
13	24 July 2021	Anchor Ravi	Vishnu Priya
14	25 July 2021	Posani Krishna Murali	Shiva Shankar Master
15	31 July 2021	Manjunath, Lasya Manjunath	Yashwanth, Varsha
16	1 August 2021	Kasthuri Shankar	Raasi
17	7 August 2021	Apparao, Subbalaxmi	Ganguly, Shiva Jyothi
18	8 August 2021	Indraja	Sudheer
19	14 August 2021	Monal Gajjar	Mumaith Khan
20	15 August 2021	Amma Rajasekhar and his family	Prabakhar and his family
21	21 August 2021	Avinash, Siri Hanmanth	Srinu, Deepika Pilli
22	22 August 2021	Bhaskar, Nooka Raju	Naresh, Rakesh Master
23	28 August 2021	Ram Prasad, Fiama	Immanuel, Varsha
24	29 August 2021	Gangavva, Kumar Sai	Noel Sean, Swathi Deekshith

== Season 5 ==
Sixth Sense
- Season 5
- Presented by: Ohmkar
- No. of episodes: 21

Release
- Original network: Star Maa
- Original release: 1 April – 10 June 2023

Season chronology
- ← Previous; Season 4

Ohmkar-hosted Sixth Sense fifth season is set to return to the small screen on 1 April 2023 onwards.

=== Format ===
Round no.	Round name	Concept
1	Sight	Five visuals (short video clips) are screened, questions are asked based on the visuals. Participants A and B need to answer/guess as many as questions they can. Each question/visual has a value of 100 marks. Whoever answers correctly between them, will get the marks. To answer, both of A and B participants need to make a similar sound of their choice for four visuals. If both of the A and B participants have same score, then there will be a Tie-break (one more visual or an image for 15 seconds will be screened). The top-scorer is qualified to play the "Sixth Sense Challenge."
2	Sound	Five songs will played (sung) by a lady (the lady is genearally, a foreigner who doesn't understand Telugu. She will be singing the song by listening the song played from her headset). Each song is valued for 100 marks. Whoever sound their respective horn, will be given chance to answer/sing the song. If both of the A and B participants have same score, then there will be a Tie-break (one more song is played/sung). Participant with maximum marks is qualified to play the "Sixth Sense Challenge."
3	Touch	Four products are placed on a table. Participants A and B need to guess the weight of each product simultaneously. Whoever, guesses the exact/accurate or approximate weight, gets 100 marks for each product. Participant with maximum marks is qualified to play the "Sixth Sense Challenge."

==== Sixth Sense Challenge ====
- Round–1 : In the first round, the top-scorer need to play any one of the challenges, i.e. "Gun Shot" or "Guess the Bike".
  Gun Shot : Two bikes are placed. The top-scorer can get any one of the bikes he wish. To win the bike, he/she need to play a game "Shoot Out". (Shoot Out game : Three cases, each containing two dummy guns (silver and black) are placed. In each case, one dummy gun is loaded and the other one is unloaded/empty. Participant need to shoot out a loaded dummy gun, by choosing any one of the two dummy guns in the three cases. Each shoot out has a value of one point. Participant need to score a minimum of two points.)
  Guess the Bike : Top-scorer of the first round will play the challenge. Three bikes are placed and the participant will be given a single key, by which he/she need to guess the suitable bike. If they matches the key and bike correctly, then they can take away the bike.
- Round–2 : Three large golden eggs are hanged, out of which, two eggs are empty and the remaining contains one lakh rupees worth Gold. The top-scorer of the second round will be given two chances, in which he/she need to break only the empty eggs. If he/she breaks the golden egg that contains gold, then they will lose the challenge.
- Round–3 : Six lockers, each containing ₹10, ₹100, ₹1000, ₹10,000, ₹1,00,000 and 10,00,000 are placed. The top-scorer need to open five of the six lockers. Amount contained in the remained (sixth) locker will be awarded to them.

=== Participants ===
Episode	Air date	Participant(s) A	Participant(s) B
1	1 April 2023	Hyper Aadi	Varshini Sounderajan
2	2 April 2023	Varun Sandesh, Vithika Sheru	Shrihan Shaik, Siri Hanmanth
3	8 April 2023	VJ Sunny, Divi Vadthya	Syed Sohel Ryan, Hamida Khatoon
4	9 April 2023	Sekhar	Sadha
5	15 April 2023	Amardeep Chowdary, Tejaswini Gowda	Shiva Kumar, Priyanka Jain
6	16 April 2023	Sreemukhi	Monal Gajjar
7	22 April 2023	Arjun Kalyan, Vasanthi Krishnan	Mehaboob Dilse, Sri Satya
8	23 April 2023	Sai Dharam Tej, Soniya Singh	Ravi Krishna, Samyuktha Menon
9	29 April 2023	Ananta Sriram	Geetha Madhuri
10	30 April 2023	Anchor Ravi	Vishnu Priya
11	6 May 2023	Deepthi Vajpayee, Radhika	Pratyusha, Mounisha
12	7 May 2023	Adi Reddy, Geetu Royal	Anchor Shiva, Sravanthi Chokarapu
13	13 May 2023	L. V. Revanth, Manisha Eerabathini	Sreerama Chandra, Ramya Behara
14	14 May 2023	Brahmaji	Rashmi Gautam
15	20 May 2023	Team Dead Pixels	Team Save the Tigers
16	21 May 2023	Naresh	Pavitra Lokesh
17	27 May 2023	Kasthuri Shankar, Neepa Shiva	Jyothi Reddy, Sushma Kiron
18	28 May 2023	Avinash, Ariyana	RJ Surya, Faima
19	3 June 2023	J. D. Chakravarthy, Eesha Rebba	Kamal Kamaraju, Josh Ravi
20	4 June 2023	Ashwin Babu, Vidyullekha Raman	Nandita Swetha, Sahithi
21	10 June 2023	Bindu Madhavi	Varalaxmi Sarathkumar

== Adaptations ==
Language	Title	Original release	Network(s)	Last aired	Notes
Telugu	Sixth Sense	31 March 2018	Star Maa	Ongoing	Original
Kannada	Sixth Sense Kannada	7 July 2018	Star Suvarna	13 October 2018	Remake
