= Mansion 24 =

Indian horror thriller television series

- Promotional poster
- Genre: Horror thriller
- Written by: Mayukh Adithya
- Directed by: Ohmkar
- Starring: Varalaxmi Sarathkumar
- Music by: Vikas Badisha
- Country of origin: India
- Original language: Telugu
- No. of seasons: 1
- No. of episodes: 6

Production
- Executive producer: Rohith Pisapati
- Producers: Ashwin Babu; Kalyan Chakravarthy
- Cinematography: B. Rajasekar
- Editor: Adi Narayan
- Running time: 30 minutes
- Production company: Oak Entertainment

Original release
- Network: Disney+ Hotstar
- Release: 17 October 2023

Mansion 24 is an Indian Telugu-language horror thriller television series written by Mayukh Adithya and directed by Ohmkar. Produced by Ashwin Babu and Kalyan Chakravarthy under the banner of Oak Entertainment, it stars Varalaxmi Sarathkumar in the lead role. It premiered 17 October 2023 on Disney+ Hotstar.

== Plot ==
An investigative journalist Amrutha starts searching for her missing father "Kalidas". He used to work in the Archaeological Survey of India and has been accused of escaping with a very valuable thing from the country, due to which he has been declared a traitor. Kalidas was last seen in an old Mansion and it is believed that whoever has visited that mansion till date has not come back alive.

While searching for her father, Amrutha arrives at the mansion and is determined to clear her father's name.

== Cast ==
- Varalaxmi Sarathkumar as Amrutha
- Sathyaraj as Kalidas
- Avika Gor as Swapna
- Bindu Madhavi as Sultana (callgirl)
- Archana Jois as Radhika (classical Dancer)
- Sriman
- Rao Ramesh as Watchman
- Amardeep as Radhika's Boyfriend
- Nandu as Lilly
- Ayyappa P. Sharma
- Manas
- Tulasi
- Jayaprakash
- Rajeev Kanakala as Rajeev
- Abhinaya as Radha
- Prabhakar
- Vidyullekha Raman
- Chatrapathi Sekhar
- Surya
- Nalini
- Shraddha Dangar as Razia

== Production ==
In September 2023, the series was announced by Disney+ Hotstar. The filming of the series was completed in 40 days.

== Reception ==
Satya Pulagam of ABP Live awarded the series 3/5 stars. Srivathsan Nadadhur of OTTPlay rated the series 2/5 stars.

== See also ==
- List of Disney+ Hotstar original programming
