= Raju Gari Gadhi 2 =

2017 Indian Telugu-language film

- Theatrical release poster
- Directed by: Ohmkar
- Screenplay by: Ohmkar
- Story by: Ranjith Sankar
- Based on: Pretham
- Produced by: Prasad V. Potluri
- Starring: Nagarjuna Akkineni; Samantha Ruth Prabhu; Seerat Kapoor; Ashwin Babu
- Cinematography: R. Diwakaran
- Edited by: Madhu
- Music by: S. Thaman
- Production companies: PVP Cinema; Matinee Entertainment; OAK Entertainments Pvt. Ltd
- Release date: 13 October 2017
- Running time: 127 minutes
- Country: India
- Language: Telugu
- Budget: ₹25 crore
- Box office: est. ₹35.2 crore

Raju Gari Gadhi 2 (transl. King's bedroom 2) is a 2017 Indian Telugu-language comedy horror film directed by Ohmkar and produced by Prasad V. Potluri under PVP Cinema, Matinee Entertainment, and OAK Entertainments banner. The film is a sequel to Raju Gari Gadhi (2015), the second installment in Raju Gari Gadhi franchise, and a remake of the Malayalam film Pretham (2016). It stars Nagarjuna Akkineni, Samantha Ruth Prabhu, Seerat Kapoor, and Ashwin Babu (reprising his role from the first film), while Abhinaya, Vennela Kishore, Praveen, and Rao Ramesh play supporting roles. The music is composed by S. Thaman with cinematography by R. Diwakaran and editing by Madhu. The film was released on 13 October 2017.

== Cast ==
- Nagarjuna Akkineni as Rudra
- Samantha Ruth Prabhu as Amritha
- Seerat Kapoor as Suhanisa
- Ashwin Babu as Ashwin
- Abhinaya as Kiran
- Vennela Kishore as Kishore
- Praveen as Praveen
- Rao Ramesh as Parandhamaiah
- Vidyullekha Raman as Bellam Sridevi
- Shakalaka Shankar as Bala Yesu
- Naresh as Father
- Avinash as Priest
- Devan as Vice Chancellor Chandra Shekar
- Nandu as Nandu
- Tejaswi Madivada as Bala
- Narayana Rao as Master
- Annapurna as Varalakshmi
- Satya Krishnan as Lecturer
- Mukhtar Khan as Commissioner Sarathchandra
- Ravi Varma as Satti
- Shatru as Land Grabbing Head
- Geetha Singh as Nimmy
- Baby Lasya as Young Amrutha

== Soundtrack ==
Raju Gari Gadhi 2

Film score by S. Thaman
- Released: 2017
- Genre: Soundtrack
- Length: 2:10
- Producer: S. Thaman

S. Thaman chronology
| Mahanubhavudu (2017) | Raju Gari Gadhi 2 (2017) | Jawaan (2017) |

All lyrics are written by Ramajogayya Sastry; all music is composed by S. Thaman.

| No. | Title | Length |
|---|---|---|
| 1. | "Beautiful Life" | 2:10 |
| Total length: | | 2:10 |

== Production ==
Raju Gari Gadhi 2, a new project with Nagarjuna Akkineni in the lead was launched on 27 November 2016 at Annapurna Studios. The principal photography commenced in February 2017 in Hyderabad. The first look of the film was launched on 29 August 2017 on Nagarjuna's birthday and the trailer has launched on 20 September 2017, on eve of ANR's birthday. The resort shown in the film is Le Pondy at Pondicherry.

== Reception ==
=== Critical reception ===
Times of India gave 3 out of 5 stars stating "The linear narrative and lack of spooks in what’s touted to be horror-comdey [sic] not withstanding, Raju Gari Gadhi 2 makes for a passable weekend watch".

== Sequels ==
It is sequel to Raju Gari Gadhi which was released in 2015. Eventually the third installment Raju Gari Gadhi 3 was released on 18 October 2019.

== See also ==
- Highest-grossing Telugu franchises and film series
