= Raju Gari Gadhi =

- Directed by: Ohmkar
- Written by: Sai Madhav Burra (dialogues)
- Produced by: Sai Korrapati
- Starring: Ashwin Babu; Chethan Cheenu; Poorna; Eshanya Maheshwari; Dhanya Balakrishna; Dhanraj; Shakalaka Shankar; Vidyullekha Raman
- Cinematography: Gnanam
- Edited by: Nagaraj
- Music by: Sai Karthik
- Production companies: Varahi Chalana Chitram; AK Entertainments Pvt. Ltd; OAK Entertainments Pvt. Ltd
- Release date: 22 October 2015
- Running time: 135 minutes
- Country: India
- Language: Telugu

Raju Gari Gadhi (transl. King's Bedroom) is a 2015 Indian Telugu-language horror comedy film directed by Ohmkar and produced by Varahi Chalana Chitram, AK Entertainments Pvt. Ltd and OAK Entertainments Pvt. Ltd. The film features an ensemble cast of Ashwin Babu, Chethan Cheenu, Poorna, Eshanya Maheshwari, Dhanya Balakrishna, Dhanraj, Shakalaka Shankar, and Vidyullekha Raman. Sai Karthik composed the film's soundtrack, while Gnanam handled the cinematography. The film received mixed reviews but was commercially successful.

A sequel, titled Raju Gari Gadhi 2, was released in October 2017, and a second sequel, Raju Gari Gadhi 3, was released in 2019. The three films are part of the Raju Gari Gadhi series.

== Plot ==
Arriving at Nandigama, a town in Andhra Pradesh, 3 youngsters are shown entering a haunted palace only to be killed immediately by a strange entity. Their corpses are found later, increasing the number of corpses that have surfaced over a period of time at the palace to 34.

Six months later, a TV channel plans to host a reality show in that haunted house. It is aptly called “Dhayyam tho 7 Rojulu, Pattukunte 3 Kotlu” (transl. 7 days with ghost, survive it to win Rs. 3 crores). Seven individuals - Ashwin (Ashwin Babu), Nandu (Chethan Cheenu), Barbie (Eshanya Maheshwari), Bala Tripura Sundari (Dhanya Balakrishna), Shivudu (Dhanraj), M. Y. Danam (Shakalaka Shankar), and Bujjimma (Vidyullekha Raman) - are selected and they reach the palace where the Program head Pakodi (Prabhas Sreenu) and Chekodi (Raghu Babu) have arranged various scares for the contestants.

Initially, everything is normal, but after some time, the contestants start feeling paranormal activities around them. Everyone begins to believe that the palace is indeed haunted, especially Ashwin. The only exception is Nandu, a doctor who refuses to accept such supernatural stories. Meanwhile, Ashwin reveals his past to Bala. His brother Dr. Karthik (Rajiv Kanakala) had begun a revolution of donating organs. But suddenly, he was found dead, and his body was discovered at the Mahal in Nandigama. Seeing Karthik's corpse, Ashwin's mother suffered strokes, and Ashwin has participated in this contest only to pay for her hospital expenses.

The show progresses, and the hauntings and attacks on the contestants increase, causing the death of Shivudu. Nandu, like the others, is now convinced that the house is haunted, but this time, it is Ashwin who claims that there are no ghosts, which leaves everyone shocked.

To investigate further, Ashwin goes around the palace alone and discovers a secret chamber. From there, he extracts his deceased brother's mobile phone. Ashwin shows the phone to Bala, and on turning it on, they find a video shot by Karthik. Karthik had visited this palace and discovered the same secret chamber where bodies were being mutilated. However, before he could expose the culprits, he was killed, his death being recorded on the phone. The culprits, caught on camera, are none other than Nandu and Barbie.

In the next scene, Ashwin and Bala are injured and captured by Nandu in the chamber. Nandu and Barbie threaten Ashwin that he has been caught, and should he reveal the truth, Bala will be killed and her body mutilated. But here, the final mystery of the movie is disclosed. It is revealed that it is not Ashwin but Nandu who has been trapped.

In reality, there are no ghosts in the palace at all. This whole reality show was set up by Ashwin with the help of police and media to catch the murderers of his brother, and 30 others who died in the palace. Nandu and Barbie run an organ smuggling racket. Ashwin had suspected them, which is why they were selected. It is further revealed that all the hauntings that occurred a few days ago with Barbie and others were orchestrated by Ashwin and Shivudu (the latter is revealed to be alive in the end).

The film ends with Ashwin being interviewed on his experience and how he donated the rest of the money to charity.

== Cast ==
- Ashwin Babu as Ashwin
- Chethan Cheenu as Dr. Nandan "Nandu"
- Poorna as Bommali
- Eshanya Maheshwari as Barbie
- Dhanya Balakrishna as Bala Tripura Sundari
- Dhanraj as Shivudu
- Shakalaka Shankar as M. Y. Danam
- Vidyullekha Raman as Bujjimma
- Prabhas Sreenu as Pakoddi
- Raghu Babu as Chekodi
- Rajiv Kanakala as Dr. Karthik
- Saptagiri as "Race Gurram" Babji
- Posani Krishna Murali as Bommali Raja
- Pavitra Lokesh
- Jeeva
- Chatrapathi Sekhar
- Sudharshan as Youngster

"Like in April 1 Vidudhala, Aahana Pellanta, Appula Appa Rao where comedy was an integral part, subject lo develop ayithe ye hero chesina navvutharu (they laugh whichever hero does it, if it’s developed within the story). They will enjoy whether Brahmanandam does it or Shakalaka Shankar performs. If there is no stuff, none of them can save the movie".

— Ohmkar on the film's box office success, 2015

== Production ==
Ohmkkar rechristened himself as Ohmkar for the film. Ohmkar's brother Ashwin Babu made his lead debut through this film. Chethan Cheenu, who previously acted was based in Chennai and acted in a Tamil film, made his Telugu debut. Instead of incorporating a different comedy track, comedy was weaved in the film's script.

== Soundtrack ==
Raju Gari Gadhi

Soundtrack album by Sai Karthik
- Released: 2015
- Recorded: 2015
- Genre: Soundtrack
- Length: 8:41
- Language: Telugu
- Label: Mango Music
- Producer: Sai Karthik

Sai Karthik chronology
Dongaata (2015)	Raju Gari Gadhi (2015)	Jatha Kalise (2015)

The soundtrack of the film was composed by Sai Karthik.

Track list
No.	Title	Lyrics	Length
1.	"La Lala Lalala" (Instrumental)		2:33
2.	"Sone Moriya"	Chandrabose	2:58
3.	"Chu Manthrakali"	Ramajogayya Sastry	3:10
Total length:			8:41

== Release and reception ==
The film was released alongside Columbus and Kanche. The satellite rights for the film was purchased by Nimmagadda Prasad.

Jeevi of Idlebrain.com rated the film 3/5 and wrote, "Raju Gari Gadhi has an interesting title and had curious promotions which made Telugu movie lovers to look up and notice. It has decent comedy and a bearable storyline with a twist".

== See also ==
- Highest-grossing Telugu franchises and film series
