= Genius (2012 film) =

- Theatrical Release Poster in Telugu
- Directed by: Ohmkar
- Screenplay by: Vissu
- Story by: Chinni Krishna
- Produced by: Dasari Kiran Kumar
- Starring: Havish; Sanusha; R. Sarathkumar; Ashwin Babu; Vinoth Kishan; Abhinaya
- Cinematography: R. Diwakaran
- Edited by: M. R. Varma
- Music by: Joshua Sridhar
- Production companies: Ramadhootha Creations; Oak Entertainment
- Release date: 28 December 2012
- Running time: 124 minutes
- Country: India
- Language: Telugu

Genius is a 2012 Indian Telugu-language film directed by Ohmkar in his directorial debut and produced by Dasari Kiran Kumar. The film features Havish, Sanusha, R. Sarathkumar, Ashwin Babu, Vinoth Kishan, and Abhinaya in the lead roles. The music was composed by Joshua Sridhar with cinematography by R. Diwakaran and editing by M. R. Varma. Writer Chinni Krishna, who has penned down stories for blockbuster Telugu movies such as Narasimha Naidu, Indra, and Gangotri, has written the film's narrative. The film was made on a budget of Rs. 11 crore and released on 28 December 2012. The presence of Sarathkumar in a prominent role led to makers to dub the film in Tamil as Acham Thavir.

== Plot ==
Best friends Nivas (Havish), Yasir (Ashwin Babu), and Jeeva (Vinoth Kishan) worship different people like fans and ruin their lives. Their faith is manipulated by the people they trust, so they decide to teach a lesson to those people and set an example for all those who are into crazy worship. Nivas worships MLA Nanaji (Pradeep Rawat); Yasir worships cricketer Nizamuddin (Adarsh Balakrishna); and Jeeva worships film star Pedda Babu (Ashish Vidyarthi). What kind of decisions the friends take forms the rest of the story.

== Cast ==
- Havish as Vishnu Venkata Srinivas
  - Gaurav Naidu as Young Nivas
- Ashwin Babu as Yasir
  - Sai Tarun as Young Yasir
- Vinoth Kishan as Jeevanandam
  - Aditya as Young Jeeva
- Sanusha as Shri
  - Charishma as Young Shri
- R. Sarathkumar as Sarath Chandra
- Abhinaya as Simran, Yasir's sister
  - Bhoomika as Young Simran
- K. Viswanath as Ramanujam
- Brahmanandam as Pandu
- Suman as Simhadri, Nivas's father
- Chandra Mohan as Salim Master, Yasir's father
- Kota Srinivasa Rao as Kotaiah, Jeeva's father
- Nagendra Babu as CBI Officer Narayana
- Pradeep Rawat as MLA Nanaji
- Ashish Vidyarthi as Peddapuram Babu Rao (Pedda Babu)
- Adarsh Balakrishna as Nizamuddin
- Jaya Prakash Reddy as Home Minister Jayaprakash (JP)
- Subhalekha Sudhakar as Bharani
- Sandhya Janak as Nivas's mother
- Annapoorna as Jeeva's mother
- Bhargavi as Shri's mother
- Paruchuri Venkateswara Rao as Nanaji's PA
- Venu Madhav as Director
- Krishna Bhagavaan as Goka Raju, Pedda Babu's PA
- Master Bharath as Chinnababu
- Surya as Cricket Coach
- Gundu Sudarshan as Bhajan Producer
- Gundu Hanumantha Rao as JP's PA
- Thagubothu Ramesh as Alankar
- Prabhakar as Nanaji's right-hand
- Venu Yeldandi as Pedda Babu's assistant
- Dhanraj Koranani as Nivas's friend
- Raghunatha Reddy as Doctor
- Fish Venkat as Father in Auto
- Allari Subhashini as Teacher
- Junior Relangi as Pujari
- Anita Hassanandani (Item number "Dibiri Dibiri")
- Rekha Vedavyas (Item number "Dibiri Dibiri")
- Shweta Basu Prasad (Item number "Dibiri Dibiri")
- Scarlett Mellish Wilson (Item number "Yededa Yededa")
- Mugur Sundar (in "Chirigina Notu")

== Soundtrack ==
The music was composed by Joshua Sridhar and released by Mango Music.

Genius

Soundtrack album by Joshua Sridhar
- Released: 22 October 2012
- Recorded: 2012
- Genre: Soundtrack
- Length: 34:28
- Label: Mango Music
- Producer: Joshua Sridhar

Joshua Sridhar chronology
Keratam (2011)	Genius (2012)	Whistle (2013)

Track list
No.	Title	Lyrics	Singer(s)	Length
1.	"Chirigina Notu"	Ananta Sriram	Benny Dayal, Apoorva	4:41
2.	"Ambani Alludaina"	Ananta Sriram	Benny Dayal, Rita	4:32
3.	"Om Om Haraha"	Ananta Sriram	Hariharan	4:06
4.	"Dibiri Dibiri"	Ananta Sriram	Priya Himesh, Geetha Madhuri	4:49
5.	"Yevevo Kalale"	Ananta Sriram	Swetha Mohan	4:37
6.	"Allah Nesthama"	Bhuvanachandra	Kailash Kher	2:15
7.	"Ye Navvu Venakala"	Krishna Chaitanya	Shankar Mahadevan	5:16
8.	"Yededa Yededa"	Sahithi	Sayanora Philip	4:12
Total length:				34:28

== Reception ==
A critic from The Times of India rated the film three-and-a-half out of five stars and wrote that "There are many other similarities too. Debutant director Ohmkkar has reason to celebrate as his movie does hit the nail on the head".
