= Akshara (film) =

2021 film directed by B. Chinni Krishna

- Theatrical release poster
- Directed by: B. Chinni Krishna
- Written by: B. Chinni Krishna
- Produced by: Allluri Suresh Varma; Bellamkonda Ahiteja
- Starring: Nandita Swetha; Shakalaka Shankar; Satya; Madhunandan; Ajay Ghosh; Sritej
- Cinematography: Nagesh Banell
- Edited by: Giduturi Satya
- Music by: Suresh Bobbili
- Production company: Cinema Hall Entertainments
- Release date: February 26, 2021
- Country: India
- Language: Telugu

Akshara is a 2021 Indian Telugu-language crime thriller film written and directed by B.Chinni Krishna, produced by Alluri Suresh Varma and Bellamkonda Ahiteja through Cinema Hall Entertainments. The film has stars Nandita Swetha in the lead role alongside Shakalaka Shankar, Satya, Madhunandan, Ajay Ghosh, and Sritej. The film's soundtrack is composed by Suresh Bobbili. After several delays, the film was released on 26 February 2021.

== Cast ==
- Nandita Swetha as Akshara
- Shakalaka Shankar as Surya
- Satya as Sampath Sarangi
- Madhunandan as Madhu
- Ajay Ghosh as Pindi Tatha
- Harsha Vardhan as Master Raghava
- Sanjay Swaroop as Principal
- Sritej as Sritej
- Shatru as police officer
- Manik Reddy as police officer
- Srikanth Iyyengar as Education Minister G. Gangaram
- Sivasankar as dance teacher
- Kancharapalem Raju as RMP Doctor

== Production ==
The film was launched and muhurat shot was done on 17 November 2018. Filming was wrapped up in February 2019. Promotional teaser was released on 20 June 2019. Later, due to various reasons the film got delayed and scheduled to release in October 2019. But again, the film's release was postponed.

== Soundtrack ==
All music is composed by Suresh Bobbili.

Telugu (OST)
No.	Title	Lyrics	Singer(s)	Length
1.	"Asuruladara"	Chaitanya Prasad	Anurag Kulkarni, Aditi Bhavaraju	4:20
2.	"Prema Desama"	Balaji	Anudeep Dev	3:42

== Release ==
Earlier on 5 September 2019, an announcement was made that the film will be released in October 2019. Finally, the film is released on 26 February 2021.
