= Kashika Kapoor =

Indian actress and model (b. 2002)

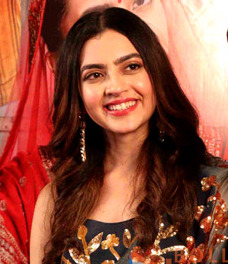
- Kapoor in 2024
- Born: Mumbai, Maharashtra, India
- Education: Jamnabai Narsee School
- Alma mater: New York Film Academy
- Occupations: Actress; model
- Years active: 2021–present
- Parents: Deepak Teckchandani (father); Divya Ritu Kapoor (mother)

Kashika Kapoor is an Indian actress, known for her work in Bollywood and Telugu cinema as well as music videos. She made her Bollywood debut in the socially driven drama Aayushmati Geeta Matric Pass (2024) and her Telugu debut in LYF: Love Your Father (2025).

== Early life and education ==
Kapoor attended Jamnabai Narsee School in Mumbai and later earned a Bachelor of Business Administration (BBA) degree via distance education from NMIMS Deemed-to-be-University. She trained in acting for six months at Jeff Goldberg Studio in Mumbai and completed a three-year professional acting course at the New York Film Academy.

== Film and television ==
Kapoor made her acting debut in the television mini-series The Vibe Hunters (2022), playing Tanya across three episodes.

Her Bollywood debut came with Aayushmati Geeta Matric Pass (2024), where she portrayed Geeta, a young woman challenging societal expectations around education for girls in rural India.

The film, directed by Prradip Khairwar, received praise for its focus on gender equality and social justice. To prepare for the role, Kapoor spent time with rural girls to authentically depict Geeta's experiences.

In 2025, Kapoor debuted in Telugu cinema with LYF: Love Your Father, directed by Pavan Ketharaju, playing the role of Sweety. The film explores the emotional bond between a father and daughter.

Kapoor has also appeared in television shows like Pyaar Tune Kya Kiya and Adaalat, and has expressed interest in participating in reality television to connect with audiences.

== Filmography ==
=== Films ===
Year	Title	Role	Language	Ref.
2024	Aayushmati Geeta Matric Pass	Geeta	Hindi	
2025	LYF: Love Your Father	Sweety	Telugu	
