= LYF: Love Your Father =

2025 Indian family drama film

- Theatrical release poster
- Directed by: Pavan Ketharaju
- Written by: Pavan Ketharaju
- Produced by: Annapareddy Samrajyam; Annapareddy Chetan Sai; Kishore Rathi; Mahesh Rathi
- Starring: Sri Harsha; S. P. Charan; Kashika Kapoor
- Cinematography: Sam K Naidu
- Edited by: Devarampati Siva Rama Krishna
- Music by: Mani Sharma
- Production companies: Manisha Arts and Media; Annapareddy Studios
- Release date: 4 April 2025
- Country: India
- Language: Telugu

LYF: Love Your Father is a 2025 Indian Telugu-language family drama film directed by Pavan Ketharaju and produced by Annapareddy Samrajyam, Annapareddy Chetan Sai, Kishore Rathi, and Mahesh Rathi. Music by Mani Sharma.

== Plot ==
LYF: Love Your Father is a heartfelt drama that explores the themes of love, resilience, and the unbreakable bond between a father and son. The story follows Siddu, portrayed by Sri Harsha, as he embarks on a relentless journey to clear his family's name and seek redemption. Throughout his quest, Siddu is guided by the spirit of his beloved father, whose influence serves as both a source of strength and motivation in overcoming the challenges he faces.

== Cast ==
- Sri Harsha
- S. P. Charan
- Kashika Kapoor as Sweety
- Nawab Shah
- Chatrapathi Sekhar
- Shakalaka Shankar
- Praveen Bellamkonda
- Raghu Babu
- Vedartham Dwarakanath

== Soundtrack ==
All music is composed by Mani Sharma.

Track listing
No.	Title	Lyrics	Singer(s)	Length
1.	"You Are My First Friend"	Rehman	Prudhvi Chandra	3:47
2.	"Party Song"	Rehman	Dhanunjay Seepana	4:04
3.	"Hey Madhumathi"	Rehman	P V N S Rohit	4:06
4.	"Chamkaare Chamka"	Kasarla Shyam	Keerthana Sharma	4:09
5.	"Biginchki Pidikilli"	Kasarla Shyam	Pavan Charan, Swarag	3:50
Total length:				19:56

== Reception ==
Sushmita Dey of Times Now gave the film three out of five stars and wrote, "the film does have its moments of predictability, especially in the plot twists that, while emotionally satisfying. Despite this, the performances and the heartfelt message of the film more than make up for any narrative shortcomings." Aditya Devulapally of Cinema Express wrote, "Overall, LYF – Love Your Father is a well-intentioned film that doesn’t fully deliver on its promise. It has moments of genuine warmth, particularly in its depiction of the father-son bond, and flirts with interesting themes of death and fate. But it lacks the narrative conviction to tie everything together seamlessly."

Suhas Sistu of The Hans India rated the film three out of five stars and wrote, "Had the comedy been toned down and the pacing tightened, Love Your Father could’ve reached even greater heights. Despite a shaky start, Love Your Father succeeds in delivering a moving revenge drama that balances myth, mystery, and emotion."
