= Rocky: The Revenge =

2019 film by K. C. Bokadia

- Poster
- Directed by: K. C. Bokadia
- Written by: K. C. Bokadia
- Produced by: Haresh Vikram Vijayakumar
- Starring: Srikanth; Eshanya Maheshwari; Nassar; Sayaji Shinde; OAK Sundar
- Cinematography: Azmal Khan
- Music by: Bappi Lahiri
- Release date: 12 April 2019
- Running time: 152 minutes
- Country: India
- Language: Tamil

Rocky: The Revenge also simply known as Rocky is a 2019 Indian Tamil-language crime thriller film written and directed by K. C. Bokadia in his Tamil directorial debut. The film stars two German Shepherd dogs as central titular characters with Srikanth and Eshanya Maheshwari. The film's story is loosely based on the 1985 Hindi film Teri Meherbaniyan which is itself remake of 1984 Kannada film Thaliya Bhagya. Scenes featuring Telugu actors were only shot in Telugu and the film was dubbed in Telugu as Namaste Nestama.

== Plot ==
The movie begins with a few animal smugglers entering a bungalow and stealing two German shepherd puppies. While on the way, the door of the van opens, and one of the puppies falls down. ACP Santhosh, who rescues the pup, takes it to his house. He and his wife name it Rocky and send it to a police dog training school. A few years later, the fully trained Rocky returns home. Meanwhile, Santhosh is at loggerheads with the local MLA Thenappan. Santhosh arrests Paandi, the henchman of Thenappan, on a weapon smuggling case and puts him behind bars. An irked Thenappan waits for a chance to kill Santhosh and bumps him off; the eyewitness to the murder is Rocky. The rest is all about how Rocky avenges the death of his master.

== Cast ==
- Two German Shepherd dogs as Rocky
- Srikanth as ACP Santhosh
- Eshanya Maheshwari as Santhosh's wife
- Sayaji Shinde as MLA Thenappan
- Nassar as Police Commissioner P. Selvam
- OAK Sundar as Paandi
- Brahmanandam as Dog Trainer
- Karate Raja as Police Officer
- Thagubothu Ramesh as Dog Trainer's assistant
- Chammak Chandra

== Production ==
The venture was announced by a prominent figure in the Bollywood industry K. C Bokadia in 2018, who has produced in excess of 50 Hindi films in his career, this film marked his directorial debut in Tamil cinema. The portions of the film were shot and set in Chennai, Hyderabad, Mumbai, Jaipur, Jaisalmer, Udaipur and Kulu Manali.

== Soundtrack ==
The songs were composed by Bappi Lahiri.

Track listing

- "Sanjari" - Hariharan, Sreedhip, Naina Nayar
- "Ulley Ulley" - Jeanath, Monika

== Release ==
The filmmakers were made aware of a plea at the Madras High Court regarding the change of film title during early April 2019. The plea suggested not to use the term Rocky in the film title as another completed Tamil film which is on the frontline to have its theatrical release also possess the same name. The filmmakers initially announced the film title as Rocky before commencing principal photography, and then after the conclusion of the filmmaking, the director renamed the title as Rocky The Hero for a temporal reason. However, the teaser of the film revealed the title as Rocky The Revenge.

== Reception ==
The film released to negative reviews.

A critic from The Times of India opined that "The story is what 80s staple revenge dramas are made of and could have worked in today’s time had a little more attention been paid to the narration". A critic from the Deccan Chronicle noted that "Had the director concentrated on a tauter screenplay keeping the present scenario in mind, the film would have been more palatable".
