= Shivam Bhaje =

2024 Indian Telugu film by Rahul Srinivas

- Theatrical release poster
- Directed by: Apsar
- Written by: Apsar
- Produced by: Maheswara Reddy Mooli
- Starring: Ashwin Babu; Digangana Suryavanshi
- Cinematography: Dasaradhi Shivendra; Anith Madadi
- Edited by: Chota K Prasad
- Music by: Vikas Badisa
- Production company: Ganga Entertainments
- Release date: 1 August 2024
- Running time: 124 minutes
- Country: India
- Language: Telugu

Shivam Bhaje is a 2024 Indian Telugu-language crime thriller film written and directed by Apsar. It stars Ashwin Babu and Digangana Suryavanshi in lead roles.

The film was released on 1 August 2024.

Here's a detailed walkthrough of the story of Shivam Bhaje from beginning to end.

Major spoilers follow.

The opening

The movie opens with intelligence agencies discovering a dangerous conspiracy. Powerful figures connected to both China and Pakistan are secretly planning to unleash a biological attack on India using a deadly chemical agent. At the same time, several scientists connected to a chemical research facility in Hyderabad are being murdered one after another by an unknown killer. The police realize the murders are connected, but they have no idea who is behind them or why.

The story then shifts to Chandrasekhar (“Chandu”), a cheerful loan recovery agent. He lives with his widowed mother and younger sister. His father died when Chandu was a child, and because of that tragedy, Chandu has grown up resenting Lord Shiva and has little interest in religion. Despite this, he enjoys a simple life, jokes with his friends, and falls in love with Shailaja, a pharmacist. They begin planning their future together while also preparing for Chandu's sister's wedding.

⸻

The accident

One day, while recovering unpaid loans, Chandu confronts a group of violent criminals. The argument escalates into a brutal fight.

During the attack, shattered glass pierces both of Chandu's eyes, leaving him completely blind.

Doctors tell him that his only hope is a rare eye transplant.

Meanwhile, the police have lost one of their most valuable assets—a highly trained police dog named Dogra. Dogra had been helping investigate the serial murders before dying. Scientists have been experimenting with advanced xenotransplantation (using specially prepared biological tissue), and Chandu becomes part of this experimental procedure. He receives transplanted eyes connected to Dogra's biological tissues.

⸻

Strange visions begin

The operation is considered a success.

Chandu can see again.

However, almost immediately, strange things begin happening.

He suddenly experiences vivid flashes of places he has never visited. He hears voices that nobody else can hear and reacts to murders before anyone has reported them.

He starts seeing frightening images of a masked killer stalking scientists.

Everyone—including his family and Shailaja—believes he is suffering from trauma or hallucinations after the surgery.

But the audience slowly realizes that Chandu is somehow seeing memories that do not belong to him.

⸻

The truth about Dogra

ACP Murali, who is investigating the murders, initially suspects Chandu because he somehow knows details about crimes that have not been made public.

Eventually, Murali realizes Chandu is not the killer.

Instead, Chandu is experiencing fragments of memories that originally belonged to Dogra, the police dog.

Because Dogra witnessed many parts of the investigation before dying, those memories have somehow survived through the transplant.

The idea is unusual and forms the film's central science-fiction premise.

⸻

Connecting the murders

Using the visions, Chandu begins helping Murali piece together clues.

Each murdered scientist had worked on an advanced chemical research project.

Someone is eliminating everyone connected with the project before stealing the completed formula.

The investigation reveals that an international terrorist network is working with corrupt insiders inside India.

Their goal is not simple murder—it is a biological terrorist attack capable of killing thousands.

The murders were merely part of covering up the larger operation.

⸻

Chandu becomes a target

As Chandu uncovers more clues, the criminals realize someone is following their trail.

Several attempts are made to kill him.

His family is threatened.

Shailaja is also placed in danger because of her relationship with him.

Although Chandu was once just an ordinary loan recovery agent, he gradually transforms into the only person capable of stopping the conspiracy.

⸻

The spiritual side of the story

Throughout the film, Chandu repeatedly encounters symbols connected to Lord Shiva.

Earlier in life he blamed Shiva for taking his father away.

Now, each time he reaches a dead end, events seem to guide him toward the next clue.

The movie leaves some of these moments open to interpretation—whether they are coincidences or divine intervention.

As the danger increases, Chandu slowly regains his faith.

The title “Shivam Bhaje” (“Praise Shiva”) reflects this spiritual journey as much as the thriller plot.

⸻

The final conspiracy

The investigation eventually uncovers the full plan.

The terrorists intend to release the stolen biological agent inside India, creating mass casualties and national panic.

Several officials have secretly been helping the foreign conspiracy.

The remaining scientists who know the truth are being hunted so no one can stop the attack.

ACP Murali and Chandu race against time to find the hidden laboratory before the weapon is released.

⸻

The climax

The final act is filled with gunfights, explosions, and hand-to-hand combat.

Chandu uses one last series of visions from Dogra to locate the terrorists’ headquarters.

Murali and the police arrive, but a fierce battle follows.

Chandu personally fights the main villain while trying to prevent the biological weapon from being activated.

The villains are defeated before they can carry out the attack.

The laboratory is destroyed, and the biological agent is secured, saving countless lives.

⸻

The ending

With the conspiracy exposed:

- The murders of the scientists are solved.
- The international terrorist plot is stopped.
- The corrupt collaborators are arrested or killed.
- Chandu is finally recognized as a hero rather than a suspect.

More importantly, Chandu lets go of the anger he has carried since childhood over his father's death.

He accepts that his extraordinary journey—and even the strange eye transplant—led him to save the country.

The film closes with Chandu embracing his faith in Lord Shiva, reuniting peacefully with his family and Shailaja, and looking toward a hopeful future. The final message suggests that while science helped solve the mystery, divine guidance helped Chandu fulfill his destiny.

== Cast ==
- Ashwin Babu as N. Chandra Sekhar "Chandu"
  - Master Chakri as Young Chandu
- Digangana Suryavanshi as Sailaja
- Arbaaz Khan as ACP Murali IPS
- Murali Sharma as Dr. Nishanth
- Tanikella Bharani as Raghu Ram
- Brahmaji as a doctor
- Ayyappa P. Sharma
- Sai Dheena as Vincent IPS
- Tulasi as Chandu's mother
- Y. Kasi Viswanath as Sailaja's father
- Devi Prasad as Chandu's father
- Mukhtar Khan
- Mayank Parakh as Rajesh
- Praveen
- Gundu Sudarshan
- Hyper Aadi as Apple Reddy
- Shakalaka Shankar
- Kireeti Damaraju as Sagar
- Rohini Reddy Noni
- Inaya Sultana
- Nitya Sri as Chandu's sister
- Balaji Gutta as Balaji
- Balagam Sanjay Krishna
- Ping Pong Surya as Eshwar
- Imax Venkat
- Appaji Ambarisha Darbha as Radhakrishna
- Erojullo Sai as Krishna
- Temper Vamsi
- Chaitanya Pasupuleti as Arjun

== Music ==
The background score and songs are composed by Vikas Badisa.

All lyrics are written by Purnachary.

Track listing
No.	Title	Singer(s)	Length
1.	"Pilla Intha Late"	Kapil Kapilan	3:04
2.	"Ram Ram Eeswaram"	Sai Charan Bhaskaruni	2:21
3.	"Shivam Bhaje Theme"	Hemachandra	3:17
4.	"Ori Devuda"	Dhanunjay Seepana	3:28

== Release ==
Shivam Bhaje was film was released on 1 August 2024. It was later released on Aha and Amazon Prime Video on 30 August 2024.

== Reception ==
Avad Mohammad of OTTPlay wrote that "Shivam Bhaje has a very interesting point but starts on a slow note and takes forever to enter the main conflict point". News18 opined that the film "takes viewers for granted" and has failed to impress sue to weak storyline.
