= Aayushmati Geeta Matric Pass =

2024 Indian drama film

- Poster of Aayushmati Geeta Matric Pass
- Directed by: Prradip Khairwar
- Written by: Navnitesh Singh
- Produced by: Prradip Khairwar; Shanu Singh Rajput, co producer: JK Entertainment and Pentech International
- Starring: Kashika Kapoor; Anuj Saini; Alka Amin; Atul Shrivastav
- Cinematography: Shanu Singh Rajput; Pappu Singh Rajput
- Edited by: Som Chavan; Manoj Kale
- Music by: Sanjiv Anand Jha
- Production companies: Good Idea Films; Spunk Productions
- Release date: 18 October 2024
- Running time: 139 minutes
- Country: India
- Language: Hindi

Aayushmati Geeta Matric Pass is an Indian family drama film starring Kashika Kapoor, Anuj Saini, Alka Amin and Atul Srivastav. Directed by Prradip Khairwar the film is set for a theatrical release on 18 October 2024.

== Synopsis ==
The film is set in a rural village located around Banaras, where women's education is not widely accepted. The protagonist, Geeta, is a teenage girl raised by her progressive father, Vidyadhar, who is determined to provide her with a proper education, regardless of societal disapproval. However, when Geeta fails her matriculation exams, her father cancels her marriage proposal and insists that she must pass her 10th grade exams before considering marriage.

The story follows Geeta's journey as she navigates societal challenges, family dynamics, and her relationship with Kundan, a boy who supports her ambitions. Kundan, despite being less educated than Geeta, breaks traditional gender norms by standing up for her education and supporting her aspirations. The film also highlights the inefficiencies and corruption in the Indian education system, with a climax centered around a major academic scam involving the top students being called for re-examinations.

== Cast ==
- Kashika Kapoor as Geeta
- Anuj Saini as Kundan
- Atul Srivastav as Vidyadhar
- Alka Amin as Malti
- Pranay Dixit as Bunty
- Vinod Suryavanshi as Chaman
- Swapnil Raut as Lakhan

== Reception ==
Ronak Kotecha of The Times of India gave 3 stars out of 5 and said that "While it may not be as tightly crafted as other socially-driven dramas like last year’s ‘12th Fail’, this film effectively conveys its message about women’s education, autonomy and agency." Simran Singh of DNA gave 3.5 stars and observed that "Aayushmati Geeta Matric Pass doesn't have a big star cast or lavish budget, but a novel story, and the engaging screenplay that will certainly entertain you."
