= Jamnabai Narsee School =

Coordinates: 19.1056°N 72.8322°E

- Mumbai, Maharashtra; India

Information
- Type: Private
- Motto: Sanskrit: विद्या परमं बलम् (Knowledge is Strength Supreme)
- Established: January 17, 1971
- Sister school: Jamnabai Narsee International School and Jamnabai Narsee School (GIFT city)
- Area trustee: Narsee Monjee Educational Trust - Jairaj C. Thacker, S. K. Oza, Urvashi J. Thacker, Jayesh D. Thacker, Shivangi J. Thacker and Sujay J. Thacker.
- School code: 27230500423
- Principal: Sonali Gandhi (JNS); Jasmine Madhani (JNIS)
- Grades: Nursery school – 12th Standard
- Enrollment: ~4800
- Average class size: 45
- School fees: ~₹3,75,000 annually
- Affiliation: Cambridge Assessment International Education; Council for the Indian School Certificate Examinations; International Baccalaureate; National Institute of Open Schooling
- Website: jns.ac.in

Jamnabai Narsee School is a private school in the affluent area of Juhu, Mumbai, Maharashtra, India. It was founded on 17 January 1971 and is managed by the Narsee Monjee Education Trust. The school building has three clusters of hexagonal classrooms, each with a hexagonal central foyer. The school is attended by children mostly from Andheri and Juhu.

== History ==
Jamnabai Narsee School was a renowned school founded on 17 January 1971. It is established and managed by the Narsee Monjee Educational Trust.

It is a co-educational, English medium school. The education imparted aims at promoting the growth and integration of all the facets of the child's personality in an ambience of Indian culture. It prepares students for ICSE and ISC.

This school is an 'Unaided Linguistic-Minority Institution', affiliated to the Council for the Indian School Certificate Examinations, Cambridge Assessment International Education, and the International Baccalaureate.

== Notable alumni ==
- Alia Bhatt
- Abhay Deol
- Shraddha Kapoor
- Emraan Hashmi
- Ishaan Khatter
- Abhishek Bachchan
- Esha Deol
- Vedang Raina
- Kareena Kapoor
- Kashika Kapoor
- Armaan Malik
- Amaal Mallik
- Ayan Mukerji
- Alaya F
- Masaba Gupta
- Anish Shah
