= Sritej =

Indian actor

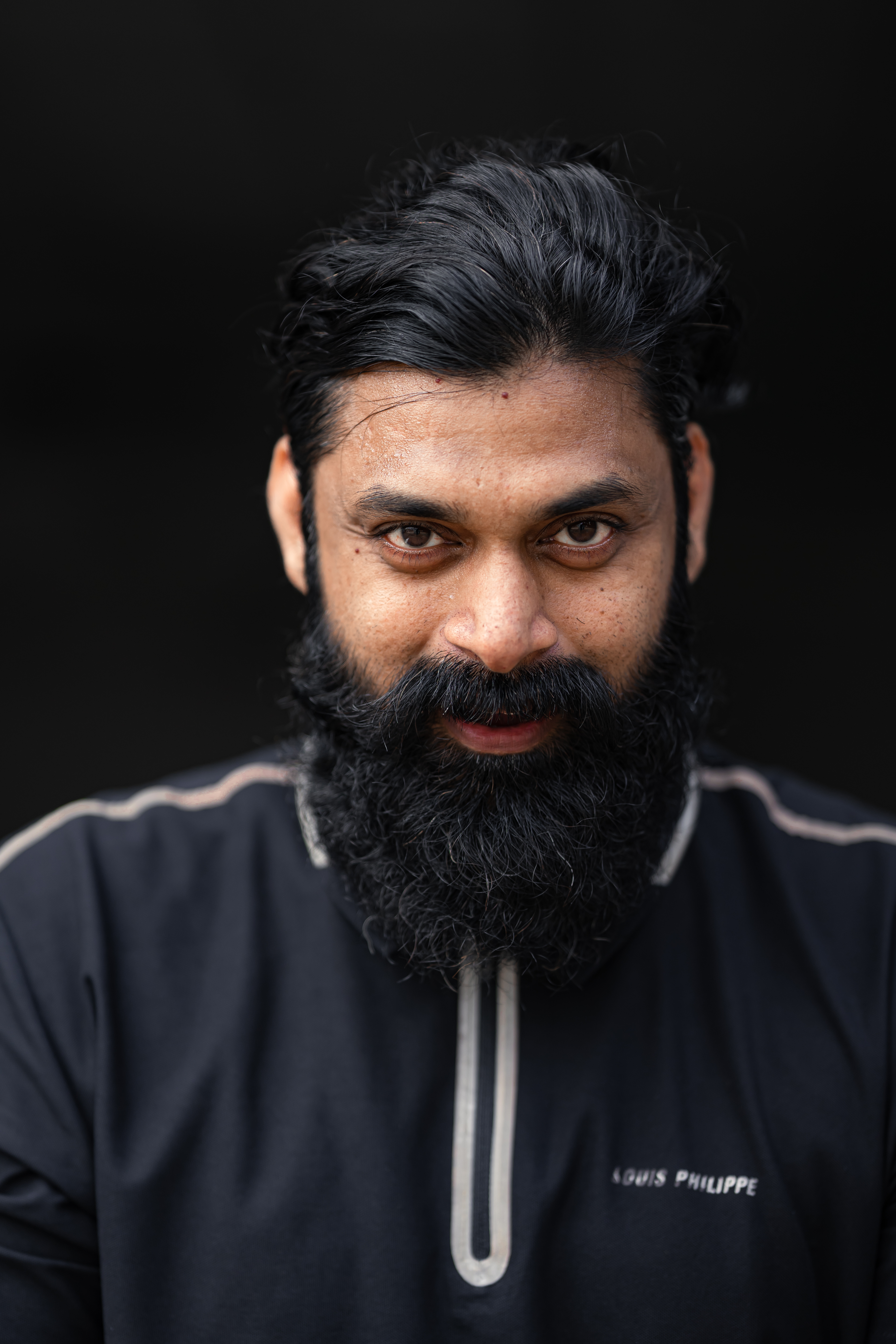
- Born: 22 August; Vijayawada, Andhra Pradesh, India
- Years active: 2006–present

Sritej is an Indian actor who works in Telugu-language films. He came into limelight with the 2019 film Lakshmi's NTR directed by Ram Gopal Varma where he essayed the role of Nara Chandrababu Naidu. He was also cast in Nandamuri Balakrishna's NTR: Kathanayakudu and NTR: Mahanayakudu as Y. S. Rajasekhara Reddy in Lakshmi's NTR.

== Career ==
Shritej started his career in 2013. He played the role of Devineni Nehru in the film Vangaveeti. He played the role of late Y. S Raja Shekar Reddy, former Chief minister of Andhra Pradesh in NTR: Kathanayakudu and NTR: Mahanayakudu. He later gained prominence with his portrayal of Nara Chandrababu Naidu in the 2019 film Lakshmi's NTR, directed by Ram Gopal Varma.

== Filmography ==
Year	Film	Role	Notes
2013	Naa Samiranga	Shiva	
2014	Via Papikondalu	Subbu	
2014	Teeyani Kalavo	Ajay	
2016	Vangaveeti	Devineni Nehru	
2017	Kadiley Bhomala Kadha	Sanjay	
2018	Aatagallu	Munna	
2018	Touch Chesi Chudu	Satyadev	
2019	NTR: Kathanayakudu	Y. S. Rajasekhara Reddy	
2019	NTR: Mahanayakudu	Y. S. Rajasekhara Reddy	
2019	Lakshmi's NTR	Nara Chandrababu Naidu	
2021	Akshara	Sritej	
2021	Naarappa	Ranga Babu	
2021	Pushpa: The Rise	Molleti Krishna Rao	
2022	Itlu Maredumilli Prajaneekam	Kanda	
2022	Dhamaka	Vikram Chakravarthy	
2022	Sakalagunabi Rama	Sandeep Bhai	
2023	Ravanasura	Devaraju	
2023	Mangalavaaram	Guraja	
2023	Dalari	Vikram Singh	
2024	Pushpa 2: The Rule	Molleti Krishna Rao	

=== Television ===
Year	Work	Role	Streaming Service
2021	Parampara	Mohan Rao	Disney+ Hotstar
2022	9 Hours	Poorna	Disney+ Hotstar
2024	Bahishkarana	Darshi	ZEE5
