= Bahishkarana =

- Official Poster
- Genre: Drama
- Screenplay by: Mukesh Prajapathi; Shaymu Chennu (Dialogue)
- Directed by: Mukesh Prajapathi
- Starring: Anjali, Sritej; Ravindra Vijay; Ananya Nagalla
- Music by: Sidharth Sadasivuni
- Country of origin: India
- Original language: Telugu
- No. of seasons: 1

Production
- Executive producer: Kiran Reddy Thumma
- Producer: Prashanti Malisetti
- Cinematography: Prasanna Kumar
- Editor: Raviteja Girijala
- Running time: 30-40 minutes
- Production company: Pixel Pictures Pvt Ltd

Original release
- Network: ZEE5
- Release: 19 July 2024

Bahishkarana is an Indian Telugu-language crime drama streaming television series directed by Mukesh Prajapathi and produced by Prashanti Malisetti. The series features Anjali, Ravindra Vijay, Sritej, Ananya Nagalla, Shanmukh, Mehboob Basha and Chaitanya Sagiraju. It premiered on ZEE5 on 19 July 2024.

== Episodes ==
No.	Title
1	"Dead Fish"
Set in the tranquil village of Peddapalli, the story begins on a seemingly ordinary day. Darshi, a caring father, sets off to buy new clothes for his daughter, Siri. Back home, Lakshmi, Siri's mother, awaits Darshi's return with anticipation. Their peaceful evening is shattered by the unexpected visit of Shivaya, the village sarpanch, whose arrival sets the stage for a series of tragic events.
2	"Brave Heat"
Pushpa, a mysterious outsider, arrives in the village seeking the sarpanch. Chitti, a local villager, guides her to the sarpanch, who allows Pushpa to stay on the outskirts and assigns Darshi to help her. As Darshi and Chitti accompany Pushpa to the temple, they encounter Suri's gang, who tease Pushpa. However, Pushpa skillfully handles the situation, earning Suri's ire. The episode ends with a hint of conflict brewing between Suri and Pushpa, setting the stage for future developments.
3	"Devil Inside"
The episode opens with the discovery of a young girl's body hanging from a banyan tree, leading to a tense confrontation between Suri and the sarpanch. As the investigation unfolds, Darshi and Pushpa's bond deepens, culminating in a proposal and acceptance. Surprisingly, the sarpanch supports their decision, even providing them with money for their wedding. However, upon returning home, Darshi and Pushpa find Lakshmi beaten. In a shocking twist, the sarpanch insists that Darshi marry Lakshmi instead of Pushpa. Torn between love and duty, Darshi reluctantly agrees to the marriage, leaving viewers questioning the sarpanch's true motives.
4	"New Beginning"
The episode begins with the sarpanch's men setting fire to Pushpa. As the investigation into the girl's death intensifies, Darshi's downfall becomes imminent, and Pushpa's loneliness deepens. Despite their initial conflict, Darshi and Lakshmi reconcile after sharing their past traumas. Darshi decides to help Pushpa escape the village, but before he can meet her, he finds himself involved in a violent confrontation with a rapist trying to harm a young girl. However, the episode ends on a cliffhanger as Darshi is arrested, leaving viewers wondering who is behind his downfall.
5	"Ashes to Ashes"
The episode delves into the past agonies of each character, revealing the hidden truths that have shaped their lives. A minor girl's plea exposes the sarpanch's true nature, while Chitti's failed escape attempt reveals Suri's sinister deeds and the village's dark secrets. Determined to seek justice, Darshi reflects on past events and resolves to confront the truth with Chitti's unwavering support. The episode concludes with a devastating blow as Pushpa arrives with the news of Darshi's demise. Darshi is buried under the rose plant gifted by the sarpanch, igniting a silent resolve among the women of the village. Reflecting on the injustices and repression they have endured, they find strength in their sorrow and unite in their determination to seek revenge.
6	"A Heart Attack"
In this climactic episode, the village finally learns the fate of the missing girls and the true reason behind Darshi's death. The sarpanch's cruelty is exposed, revealing the dark reality behind his authoritative facade. As the truth comes to light, Lakshmi and Pushpa reflect on the injustices and repression they have endured. United in their sorrow, they find the strength to seek revenge, proving that when a woman decides to fight, she is unstoppable.

== Cast ==
- Anjali as Pushpa
- Ravindra Vijay as Shivaya
- Sritej as Darshi
- Ananya Nagalla as Lakshmi
- Shanmukh as Suri
- Mehboob Basha as Chitti
- Chaitanya Sagiraju as Gopi

== Release ==
The series was released on 19 July 2024.

== Reception ==
Bahishkarana largely drew positive reviews. The Hindustan Times rated it 3 out of 5 in its review. IndiaGlitz rated it 3 as well, commenting, " The series' compelling premise and exploration of social issues are commendable." The show drew similar ratings from NTV. OTT Play commended Anjali's performance in the show and stated, "Anjali leads from the front and plays a bold role for the first time in her career. She, as Puspa, holds our attention."
