= Peigal Jaakkirathai =

2016 Indian film by Kanmani

- Theatrical release poster
- Directed by: Kanmani
- Produced by: G. Raghavan
- Starring: Jeeva Rathnam; Eshanya Maheshwari
- Cinematography: Mallikarjun
- Edited by: Suresh Urs
- Music by: Maria Jerald
- Production company: Sri Sai Sarvesh Entertainment
- Distributed by: Escape Artists Motion Pictures
- Release date: 1 January 2016
- Country: India
- Language: Tamil

Peigal Jaakkirathai (transl. Beware of ghosts) is a 2016 Indian Tamil-language horror comedy film, written and directed by Kanmani. This is a Tamil remake of the Korean movie Hello Ghost. The film stars Jeeva Rathnam and Eshanya Maheshwari, while Thambi Ramaiah, Rajendran and John Vijay in supporting roles. Featuring music composed by Maria Jerald, Peigal Jaakkirathai was released on 1 January 2016.

== Cast ==
- Jeeva Rathnam as Saravanan
- Eshanya Maheshwari as Gayathri
- Thambi Ramaiah as Pazhanivel Annachi
- Manobala as Gayathri's father
- John Vijay as Sagayam
- Rajendran as Gayathri's uncle
- Naresh as Saravanan's father
- V. I. S. Jayapalan as Saravanan's grandfather
- Pandi as Annachi's worker
- Halwa Vasu
- Mohana Priya as Gayathri's mother
- Boys Rajan as Doctor
- Tarun Kumar
- Theni Murugan
- Mippu
- Mona Batra
- Sandhya Jagarlamudi as Bhavani
- Kalavani Devi
- Gehana Vasisth as item number

== Production ==
Eshanya Maheshwari plays a college girl in the film. The film was predominantly shot around Chennai, Mahabalipuram and the surrounding areas during June 2015. In October 2015, lyricist Kabilan Vairamuthu made a statement denying claims that the lyrics of a particular song from the film that he had written had political connotations. For another song in the film's soundtrack, Thambi Ramaiah and Rajendran recorded their voices and shot for a promotional video.

In December 2015, Escape Artists Motion Pictures agreed to distribute the film, raising the profile and commercial viability of the project.

== Soundtrack ==
The soundtrack was composed by debutant Maria Jerald, and lyrics were done by Kabilan Vairamuthu and Viveka. The song "Obama" was well received by the audience. The background score was done by S. P. Venkatesh.

Songs	Singers	Lyrics
"Obama"	Thambi Ramaiah, Rajendran	Viveka
"Maandhreega Kaari"	Anthony Daasan	Kabilan Vairamuthu
"Peigal Jaakiradhai"	Diwakar	Kabilan Vairamuthu

== Release ==
The film opened on 1 January 2016 to mixed reviews, with a critic from Times of India noting "much of the humour is silly and we do experience a twinge of embarrassment for having laughed at the uninspired jokes — but that happens only after the film is over". The critic also likened the film's plot to Massu Engira Masilamani (2015) and Om Shanthi Om (2015), stating that in "less than a year, we have had three Tamil films which have been inspired from the Korean comedy, Hello Ghost (2010)".
