= Hidimbha =

- Aha Release Poster
- Directed by: Aneel Kanneganti
- Written by: Kalyana Chakravarthy (dialogues)
- Produced by: Gangapatnam Sridhar
- Starring: Ashwin Babu; Nandita Swetha
- Cinematography: B. Rajasekar
- Edited by: M. R. Varma
- Music by: Vikas Badisa
- Production companies: Sri Vignesh Karthik Cinemas; OAK Entertainments
- Release date: 20 July 2023
- Country: India
- Language: Telugu

Hidimbha is a 2023 Indian Telugu-language psychological action thriller film directed by Aneel Kanneganti and produced by Gangapatnam Sridhar. The film stars Ashwin Babu and Nandita Swetha. The film was released on 20 July 2023.

== Plot ==
The movie starts with the disappearance of girls in Hyderabad city. Police officer Adhya has been appointed to resolve the mystery. Fearless cop Abhay, who was Adhya's former lover, is also with her team. Adhya and Abhay find out that the unknown killer targets only girls with red dresses. Adhya's father was also missing long ago to solve the same type of missing cases in the forest of Kerala. It reveals that an aborigine clan named Hidimba is behind those ruthless murders. The climax reveals that all the girls were killed by Abhay (whose real name is Joseph Thomas) because he was a cannibal since childhood: he used to drink blood and eat meat. Adhya finds Abhay's secret chamber and realizes this. Finally, she shoots him.

== Cast ==
- Ashwin Babu as Abhay IPS alias Joseph Thomas
- Nandita Swetha as Aadhya IPS
- Makarand Deshpande as Vetti
- Srinivasa Reddy as Police Officer
- Sahithi Avancha
- Sanjay Swaroop
- Shiju as Aadya's father, a police officer.
- Vidyullekha Raman as Police Officer
- Rajeev Kanakala
- Subhalekha Sudhakar as Chief Minister
- Ajay Rathnam as Thilak
- Raghu Kunche as Police Officer
- Rajeev Pillai as Boya, a criminal
- Chatrapathi Sekhar
- Shibu Menon
- Robin Thirumala

== Production ==
The film began production in 2021. The film was shot in Hyderabad, the forests in Kerala and Andaman Islands. In November 2022, the shooting for the film had been completed.

== Soundtrack ==
The music was composed by Vikas Badisa.

Track listing
No.	Title	Lyrics	Singer(s)	Length
1.	"Memories Memories"	Virinchi Putla	Yasaswi Kondepudi, Yazin Nizar, Vikas Badisa	3:36
2.	"I am the Bad Guy"	Pranavam	Lavita Lobo, Vikas Badisa	2:55
3.	"Theme Music"	Ramajogayya Sastry, B. Subbaraya Sharma	—	2:37
Total length:				9:08

== Release and reception ==
Hidimbha was released on 20 July 2023. Post theatrical digital rights were acquired by Aha and was premiered on 10 August 2023.

A critic from Sakshi rated the film 2 out of 5. Raghu Bandi of The Indian Express stated in his review that the film is, "a daring subject that comes undone by its conclusion". BVS Prakash of Deccan Chronicle opined that "Young director Aneel Kanneganti had a good and novel plot on his hand and also triggered some interest with his trailers, but he couldn’t really handle the multi-layered script with conviction and left the audience in despair". A critic from ABP Desam rated the film 2 1/2 out of 5.
