= Dalari =

Telugu-language political thriller

- Theatrical poster
- Directed by: Kachidi Gopal Reddy
- Written by: Kachidi Gopal Reddy
- Story by: Kachidi Gopal Reddy
- Produced by: Adavelli Venkat Reddy
- Starring: Rajeev Kanakala; Shakalaka Shankar; Sritej; Aqsa Khan
- Cinematography: Mentum Satish
- Edited by: Nandamuri Hari
- Music by: Gowda Hari
- Production company: Aakriti Creations
- Release date: 15 December 2023
- Country: India
- Language: Telugu

Dalari is a 2023 Indian Telugu-language political thriller film written and directed by Kachidi Gopal Reddy, and is produced by Adavelli Venkat Reddy. It stars Rajeev Kanakala, Shakalaka Shankar, Sritej, Aqsa Khan and Rupika. The film score is composed by Hari Gowda, and cinematography was done by Satish.

== Plot ==
Abhi was loved by his Engineering college mate Swati, while on the other hand, Abhi is in love with his long-time friend Shruthi, who is involved in a college project. Meanwhile, Venkat Reddy, a political leader, who is also a Dalari, follows only the rules he believes in. His leading principles in politics are populism and social change.

When CI Vikram declares himself as the biggest enemy of Venkat Reddy, the story takes a major turn. Abhi stands by Venkat Reddy and becomes his trusted lieutenant. How are Abhi and Venkat related, what is Vikram's motive in arresting Venkat Reddy, and how Venkat Reddy comes out of the case, forms the rest of the story.

== Cast ==
- Rajeev Kanakala as Venkat Reddy
- Shakalaka Shankar as Abhi
- Sritej as CI Vikram
- Aqsa Khan as Swati
- Rupika as Shruti
- Getup Srinu
- Jabardast Ram
- Gemini Suresh

== Music ==
The music was composed by Hari Gowra.

Dalari

Soundtrack album by Gowra Hari
- Released: 21 November 2023
- Genre: Film Soundtrack
- Length: 8:27
- Language: Telugu
- Label: Mango Music

Gowra Hari chronology
Sindhooram (2023 film) (2023)	Dalari (2023)	Vachinavadu Goutham

Track Listing
No.	Title	Singers	Length
1.	"Annadhammulanu"	Sai Charan Bhaskaruni	3:55
2.	"Ra Ra Rey Rajyamedaina"	Gowra Hari	4:32
Total length:			8:27

== Release ==
The movie first look was launched on 8 March 2022. The film was released on 15 December 2023.

== Reception ==
The film received mildly positive to negative reviews.

A reviewer of Timesnownews gave 3 stars to the film and stated, "The film's seamless blend of emotions, suspense, and familial dynamics, set against the intriguing world of Benami dealings, makes it a compelling watch."

A reviewer of Sakshipost gave a mixed review and mentioned the suspense in the second half as a thumbs up, but the production values as a thumbs down.
