= Suvarna =

2026 Telugu-language Indian film

- Directed by: Ashok Royya
- Written by: Ashok Royya
- Produced by: Ashok Royya
- Starring: Shakalaka Shankar
- Cinematography: Gopinath Kakarla
- Edited by: Gouse Baba
- Music by: Gowtham Raviram
- Production company: Aaradhya Creations
- Release date: 3 April 2026
- Running time: 103 minutes
- Country: India
- Language: Telugu

Suvarna is a 2026 Indian Telugu-language horror-comedy directed and produced by Ashok Royya. It starred Pallavi and Shakalaka Shankar.

The film is produced under the banner Aradhya Creations. The film's music is composed by Gowtham Raviram, cinematography is handled by Gopinath Kakarla, and is edited by Gouse Baba.

== Plot ==
The story begins as a happy couple, Pallavi and Jagadeesh, shift into a new house. While the husband is busy with his job, Pallavi is busy with her household works. While Pallavi is dusting her new house she finds an old mobile phone in the house.

As Pallavi becomes curious and switches on the mobile phone and starts watching reels, her behavior begins to change dramatically, leading her to obsessively make reels of her own and behave strangely. Soon it will be revealed that she is possessed by a restless ghost as she continues to use that mobile phone. The rest of the story shows how the husband uncovers the mystery behind his wife's strange behavior, and free his wife from the ghost possession.

== Cast ==
- Pallavi as Mahalakshmi
- Shakalaka Shankar
- Pawan
- Jagadeesh
- Jabardasth Rajamouli
- Varnika
- Devi

== Music ==
The film's music is composed by Goutham Raviram.

No.	Title	Lyrics	Singer	Length
1.	"Ottesi Chebuthunna"	Virinchi Putla	Venu Srirangam	2:40
Total length:				2:40

== Release ==
The film is released on 3 April 2026.

== Reception ==
The film received average ratings, ranging from 2.5 to 3 out of 5.

Suhas Sistu of Hans India gave 3 out of 5 stars to the film, and said that the film balanced the horror and humor effectively.

Sunil Boddula of News18 praised Pallavi and Shakalaka Shankar's acting in the movie.

The reviewer of HMTV gave the film 2.5 out of 5 stars, and said that the screenplay felt routine in some parts, and that the climax worked well.
