= Dancee Plus =

Indian reality TV show

- Also known as: Dancee +
- Genre: Reality dance
- Developed by: Ohmkar
- Presented by: Ohmkar
- Country of origin: India
- Original language: Telugu
- No. of seasons: 1
- No. of episodes: 43

Production
- Producers: Ohmkar; Ashwin Babu; Kalyan
- Production locations: Hyderabad, India
- Camera setup: Multi-camera
- Running time: 90 minutes.
- Production company: OAK Entertainments

Original release
- Network: Star Maa
- Release: 27 December 2020 – 23 May 2021

Dancee Plus (or colloquially Dancee +) is an Indian Telugu-language dance competition reality television series, which premiered on 27 December 2020 and broadcast on Star Maa. The series is produced by OAK Entertainments house. The auditions for the show were carried throughout in India, between 1 November 2020 and 30 November 2020.

This series is hosted and presented by Ohmkar with Anee, Baba Bhaskar, Monal Gajjar, Mumaith Khan, Vishwa Raghu and Yashwanth are the mentors of the show. Sanket Sahadev is the winner of the show and was awarded with ₹20 lakh. Grand finale of the first season was aired on 23 May 2021.

== Concept ==
Dancee Plus Telugu judges selected 12 contestants/groups from the audition rounds. Later this contestants/groups are divided in between all the 6 judges. So, each judge has 2 contestants/groups under his/her mentorship. The series features dance performers, including solo acts, Duo and larger groups representing any style of dance, competing for a grand prize. Contestants dance to a different tune, different theme and different styles every week and scores are given by the judges. If for a judge both teams have been eliminated, then that respective judge also eliminates. A wildcard as 13th contestant entered.

== Series overview ==
Series	Host	Episodes	Originally released			Contestants	Winning Judge	Winner	Runner-up
Series	Host	Episodes	First released	Last released	Network	Contestants	Winning Judge	Winner	Runner-up
1	Ohmkar	43	27 December 2020	23 May 2021	Star Maa	13	Yashwanth	Sanket Sahadev	Tejaswini and Maheswari

== Season 1 ==
Dancee Plus
- Season 1
- Presented by: Ohmkar
- Judges: Anne Master; Monal Gajjar; Baba Bhaskar; Yashwanth; Mumaith Khan; Raghu Master
- Winner: Sanket Sahadev
- Runners-up: Tejaswini and Maheswari
- No. of episodes: 43

Release
- Original network: Star Maa
- Original release: 27 December 2020 – 23 May 2021

Season chronology
- Next → Season 2

=== Score Chart ===
- Each judge would give either green or red plus to contestant based on their performance but judges should not give pluses to their respective teams.
- Scores are out of 5+ in episode 1–25 and 30–41
- Scores are out of 4+ in episode 26–29
- Contestants who have received 5+, they will get a chance to win God of Dance Trophy and it indicates that the contestant will be saved in elimination round.

Contestants	Episodes	2 - 3	4 - 5	6 - 7	8 - 9	10 - 11	12 - 13	14 - 15	16 - 17	18 - 19	20 - 21	22 - 23	24 - 25	26 - 27	28 - 29	30 - 31	32 - 33	34 - 35	36 - 37	38 - 39	40 - 41	42	43
Contestants	Theme	Introduction Round	Dance with Properties	Dance with Judges	1st Elimination round	Dance with Celebrity	2nd Elimination round	Love Theme	3rd Elimination round	Concept Theme	4th Elimination round	Judges Challenge	5th Elimination round	Recreation Theme	6th Elimination round	Old Mix	7th Elimination round	Fast Beat	8th Elimination round	Biopic Theme	9th Elimination round	Pre - Finale	Grand Finale
Sanket Sahadev	solo	5+	3+	5+	5+	5+	5+	5+	3+	5+	5+	2+	5+	3+	4+	5+	5+	2+	5+	3+	5+	No score	Winner
Tejaswini and Maheswari	Duo	5+	5+	5+	5+	5+	5+	2+	5+	4+	2+	4+	5+	3+	4+	5+	5+	1+	1+	Eliminated		No Score	Runner up
Vasi Tony	Group	3+	3+	5+	5+	4+	5+	4+	5+	3+	4+	5+	5+	4+	4+	5+	3+	2+	4+	1+	3+	No score	2nd Runner up
Jiya Thakur	Solo	5+	4+	5+	2+	5+	5+	5+	5+	4+	5+	5+	4+	4+	4+	3+	4+	4+	5+	2+	5+	No score	3rd Runner up
Darjeeling Devils	Group	2+	1+	5+	4+	5+	5+	5+	5+	3+	4+	4+	4+	4+	4+	3+	3+	5+	3+	5+	5+	No score	4th Runner up
Team Velocity	Group	4+	1+	5+	3+	2+	5+	5+	3+	4+	4+	5+	5+	4+	4+	5+	3+	4+	5+	3+	3+	Walked Out (Episode 42)	
Niveditha	Solo	4+	5+	5+	5+	3+	5+	5+	3+	3+	3+	5+	5+	3+	4+	3+	4+	4+	2+	5+	4+	Walked Out (Episode 42)	
Priya Burman	Solo	Not in Competition (Entered as wildcard entry in episode 30)														5+	5+	3+	5+	2+	5+	Eliminated (Episode 41)	
MMK	Trio	4+	0+	5+	0+	5+	5+	4+	5+	2+	5+	5+	5+	4+	2+	0+	5+	Eliminated (Episode 33)					
Ram Lakshman	Duo	4+	5+	5+	3+	4+	5+	4+	4+	3+	4+	4+	4+	Eliminated (Episode 25)									
Anchy Mumbai	Group	3+	2+	5+	5+	5+	2+	3+	4+	2+	1+	Eliminated (Episode 21)											
8 Countz	Group	5+	0+	5+	5+	5+	3+	Eliminated (Episode 13)															
Lungi Mamas	Group	2+	4+	5+	2+	Eliminated (Episode 9)																	
God of Dance Trophy	Group A	Sanketh Sahadev	Niveditha	Team Velocity	Niveditha	MMK	Sanketh Sahadev	Darjeeling Devils		Sanketh Sahadev	Sanketh Sahadev	MMK	Team Velocity	Darjeeling Devils	Team Velocity	Priya Burman	Team Velocity	Darjeeling Devils	Sanket Shahdev	Niveditha	Darjeeling Devils	Vasitony crew	Team Velocity
God of Dance Trophy	Group A	Sanketh Sahadev	Ram Lakshman	Team Velocity	Niveditha	MMK	Sanketh Sahadev	Darjeeling Devils		Sanketh Sahadev	MMK	MMK	Team Velocity	Darjeeling Devils	Team Velocity	Priya Burman	Team Velocity	Darjeeling Devils	Sanket Shahdev	Niveditha	Darjeeling Devils	Vasitony crew	Team Velocity
God of Dance Trophy	Group B	Jiya Thakur	Tejeswini & Maheshwari	Jiya Thakur	8 Countz	Jiya Thakur		Team Velocity	Vasitony Crew	None	Jiya Thakur		Vasitony Crew				Tejeswini & Maheshwari	None	Sanketh Sahadev	None	Jiya Thakur	None	

Team Anee
Team Baba Bhaskar
Team Mumaith
Team Raghu
Team Monal
Team Yashwanth
indicates the contestant won God of Dance Trophy
indicates the contestant Eliminated

=== Eliminations ===
- 1st Elimination : Lungi Mamas
- 2nd Elimination : 8 Countz
- 3rd Elimination : Anchy Mumbai
- 4th Elimination: Ram Lakshman (after the elimination of Ram Lakshman, Judge Mumaith Khan was also eliminated because both of her teams were eliminated). (Again on the entrance of Priya Burman as a wild card, Judge Mumaith Khan re-entered Dancee+ show on 10-04-2021).
- 5th Elimination: Team velocity(Again as Wild card team Velocity returned and Monal Gajjar adopted them)
- 6th Elimination : MMK
- 7th Elimination: Tejaswini and Maheswari (Reenters again with a wild card in Pre Finale)
- 8th Elimination: Priya Burman (after the elimination of Priya Burman, Judge Mumaith Khan has also been eliminated because both of her teams and the wild card entrant has been eliminated)
- 9th Elimination : Niveditha (Hand Fracture) and she replaced by Maheshwari and Tejeshwini in the pre-finale and were sorted into Baba Bhaskar's team
- 10th Elimination: Team Velocity (Couldn't practice due to Covid Precaution Norms)
- 4th Runner up: Darjeeling Devils (Raghu Master team )
- 3rd Runner Up: Jiya Thakur (Anee master member)
- 2nd Runner Up: Vasitony crew (Yashwanth Master team)
- Runner Up : Tejaswini and Maheswari (as they are in second position, the judge Baba Bhaskar is runner up judge)
- Winner : Sanket Sahadev (as Sahadev is in first place, the judge Yashwanth Master is the winner Judge)

== Reception ==
The grand premiere has gained 9.0 TRP.
