= Eshanya Maheshwari =

Indian actress (born 1993)

- Born: 17 June 1993 (age 33); Mumbai, India
- Occupations: Model, actress
- Years active: 2015–2024 (actress); 2024–present (model)

Eshanya Maheshwari (born 17 June 1993) is a model and former actress who worked in Tamil, Telugu and Hindi films.

== Career ==
After working in the successful horror film Raju Gari Gadhi (2015), she worked on Tamil films including the horror film Peigal Jaakkirathai and Rocky: The Revenge (2019) and a Hindi film, she later retired from the industry..

== Filmography ==
Year	Title	Role	Language	Notes
2015	Raju Gari Gadhi	Barbie	Telugu	
2016	Peigal Jaakkirathai	Gayathri	Tamil	
2019	Rocky: The Revenge	Santhosh's wife	Tamil	
2024	Kya Masti Kya Dhoom		Hindi	Released on Waves OTT
