= Chatrapathi Sekhar =

Indian actor

- Born: Chandra Sekhar
- Occupation: Actor
- Years active: 2001–present

Chandra Sekhar, known professionally as Chatrapathi Sekhar, is an Indian actor who primarily works in Telugu films. He is known for his frequent collaborations with S. S. Rajamouli.

== Career ==
Sekhar is a regular in S. S. Rajamouli's films and played a lawyer in Sye (2004). He garnered acclaim for his role as Prabhas's friend in Chhatrapati (2005). While shooting for Chhatrapati on a boat thirty five kilometers into the ocean, Sekhar had almost fallen off the boat. Prabhas caught Sekhar by his leg and pulled him back onto the boat.

He has since portrayed notable roles in several Telugu films including Vikramarkudu (2006), Magadheera (2009), the bilingual Eega (2012), Rangasthalam (2018), the bilingual film U Turn (2018). He portrayed a farmer in the historical film Yatra and played one of the leads in Diksoochi (2019). He played Jr. NTR's friend in RRR.

== Personal life ==
Sekhar was briefly married Neelya Bhavani, whom he met on the sets of Krishnarjuna Yudham. The couple have two children, they got divorced and currently living separately.

== Filmography ==
=== Telugu ===
- Student No. 1 (2001)
- Simhadri (2003) as Henchman
- Abhimanyu (2003)
- Sye (2004) as Bikshu Yadav's Lawyer
- Chatrapathi (2005) as Bhadram
- Ashok (2006)
- Vikramarkudu (2006)
- Dhee (2007)
- Raksha (2008)
- Flash News (2009)
- Magadheera (2009) as Raghuveer's sidekick
- Mahatma (2009)
- Kalavar King (2010)
- Maryada Ramanna (2010) as Raghava Rao
- Sakthi (2011) as Basava
- Racha (2012)
- Dhammu (2012)
- Daruvu (2012)
- Eega (2012) as Tantra
- Balupu (2013)
- Legend (2014)
- Aagadu (2014)
- Karthikeya (2014)
- Maha Bhaktha Siriyala (2014)
- Kick 2 (2015)
- Srimanthudu (2015)
- Raju Gari Gadhi (2015)
- Dhruva (2016)
- Sarovaram (2017)
- Jai Simha (2018)
- Rangasthalam (2018) as Ganapathi
- Krishnarjuna Yudham (2018)
- U Turn (2018)
- Yatra (2019)
- Diksoochi (2019)
- Ranasthalam (2019)
- Arjun Suravaram (2019)
- Akhanda (2021)
- RRR (2022) as Jangu
- The Warriorr (2022; uncredited)
- Veera Simha Reddy (2023) as Veeranna
- Virupaksha (2023) as Suri
- Bhari Taraganam (2023)
- Hidimbha (2023)
- Nindha (2024) as Balraju
- Music Shop Murthy (2024)
- Pottel (2024)
- Jithender Reddy (2024)
- LYF: Love Your Father (2025)
- Hari Hara Veera Mallu (2025) as Dasanna
- Thank You Dear (2025)
- Mrithyunjay (2026)

=== Other languages ===
- Satya in Love (2008; Kannada)
- Koottam (2014; Tamil)
- U Turn (2018; Tamil)
- Viswasam (2019; Tamil)
- Rowdy Rocky (2022: Bhojpuri) as journalist

=== Television ===
- Santhi Nivasam (ETV)
- Padmavyuham (ETV)
- Vaishali (Zee Telugu)
- Manasichi Choodu as Nagineedu (2019–2022; Star Maa)
- Radhamma Kuthuru as Gopala Krishna (2019–2024; Zee Telugu)
- Rangula Ratnam (2021–2025; ETV Telugu)
- Lakshmi Nivasam as Srinivasam (2025–present; Zee Telugu)
