= Ohmkar =

Indian television presenter and film director

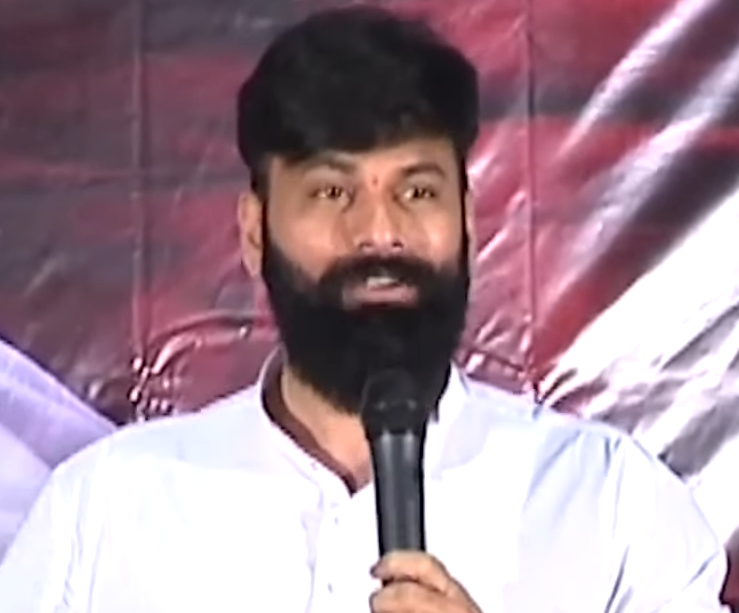
- Ohmkar in 2021
- Born: 4 October 1980 (age 45); Tenali, Andhra Pradesh, India
- Education: GBR College, Anaparthi
- Occupation: Film Director Television Presenter
- Spouse: Swaroopa (m. 2011)
- Children: 2
- Relatives: Ashwin Babu (brother)

Ohmkar Nuthalapati is an Indian television presenter and film director who predominantly works in Telugu television and films. He made his debut in television as a writer. He is best known for producing and hosting television shows Mayadweepam, Aata and Sixth Sense. He is known for directing the Raju Gari Gadhi films.

== Early and personal life ==
Ohmkar was born in Tenali, Andhra Pradesh, India. He was born into a Telugu-language speaking Hindu family. His father N. V. Krishna Rao was a doctor in Kakinada. He has two brothers and one sister. His brother Ashwin Babu is an actor in Tollywood and their other brother Kalyan Babu is a producer. His sister name is Srivalli.

He holds a bachelor's degree in Physiotherapy from GBR AC Campus, Anaparthi, East Godavari, Andhra Pradesh. He married Swaroopa in 2011 and the couple has 2 children.

== Career ==
=== 2000–2011: Career in television ===
Ohmakar made his debut into television as a writer. He has also a video jockey in the music show Ankitham on Gemini Music (Previously 'Aditya Music'). In 2005, he created and presented dance reality show Aata on Zee Telugu. This show became widely popular on Telugu Television. People fondly started calling Ohmkar as 'Ohmkar Annayya'. He soon became one of the popular television celebrities.

He further produced, created and hosted many television shows like Maayadweepam, Challenge, 100% luck, etc. Ohmkar started a film and television production company, OAK Entertainments, which is headed by his brother, Kalyan Babu.

=== 2012: Debut into Telugu cinema ===
He then turned into film director due to his passion to film making. He directed his first Telugu film Genius, which did not perform well. He introduced his brother, Ashwin Babu, as an actor through the film. On the other side, he continued hosting television shows.

=== 2015 ===
He got his big success for directing Raju Gari Gadhi (2015), which was a huge commercial success. With the film, Ohmakar created the Raju Gari Gadhi series and directed two other films in the series, however, they did not perform as well as the first film.

== Filmography ==
As Director
Year	Title	Notes	Ref.
2012	Genius	Nominated– SIIMA Award for Best Debut Director – Telugu	
2015	Raju Gari Gadhi		
2017	Raju Gari Gadhi 2		
2019	Raju Gari Gadhi 3		

=== Television ===
Year	Title	Role	Network	Notes
2000–2003	Pavithra Bandam	Writer	Gemini TV	
2005	Ankitham	VJ	Aditya Music	
2006	Mayadweepam 1	Host	Zee telugu	Creator and host of the show
2007	Mayadweepam 2	Host	Zee Telugu	Also producer and creator
2007	Aata Season 1	Host	Zee Telugu	Also creator of the show
2008	Aata Season 2	Host	Zee Telugu	Also producer and creator
2008	Mayadweepam 3	Host	Zee Telugu	Also producer and creator
2009	Aata Juniors Season 1 and 2	Host	Zee Telugu	Also producer and creator
2009	Mayadweepam 4	Host	Zee Telugu	Also producer and creator
2010	Aata Juniors Season 3 and 4	Host	Zee Telugu	Also producer and creator
2009-10	Mayadweepam 5	Host	Zee Telugu	Also producer and creator
2009–2010	Challenge	Host	Maa TV	Also producer and creator
2009–2010	Sa Re Ga Ma Pa Juniors	Host	Zee Telugu	
2010	Adrushtam	Host	Maa TV	Also creator of the show
2010	Aata 2010	Host	Zee Telugu	Also producer and creator
2011	Aata Juniors Season 5	Host	Zee Telugu	Also producer and creator
2011	50-50 It's My Game Show	Host	Maa TV	
2011	Aata 2011	Host	Zee Telugu	Also producer and creator
2012	Aata Juniors Season 6	Host	Zee Telugu	Also producer and creator
2012–2013	100% Luck	Host	Maa TV	Also creator of the show
2013	Mayadweepam 6 (2013-14)	Host	Zee Telugu	Also producer and creator
2014	Maayadweepam 6 (2013-14)	Host	Zee Telugu	Also producer and creator
2018	Sixth Sense Season 1	Star Maa	Also creator of the show	
2018	Aata Juniors Season 7	Judge	Zee Telugu	
2018–2019	Sixth Sense Season 2	Host	Star Maa	Also creator of the show
2019	Konchem Touch Lo Unte Chepta Season 4	Guest	Zee Telugu	Episode 14
2019–2020	Sixth Sense Season 3	Host	Star Maa	Also creator of the show
2020	Ishmart Jodi Season 1	Host	Star Maa	
2020–2021	Dancee Plus Season 1	Host	Star Maa	Also creator of the show
2021	Comedy Stars Season 1 & 2	Producer	Star Maa	Also creator of the show
2021	Sixth Sense Season 4	Host	Star Maa	Also producer and creator
2021	Maayadweepam 2021	Host	Zee Telugu	Also producer and creator
2021–2022	Ishmart Jodi Season 2	Host	Star Maa	Also producer and creator
2022	Comedy Stars Dhamaka	Producer	Star Maa	
2022	Dance Ikon	Host	Aha and Gemini TV	Also creator of the show
2023	Sixth Sense Season 5	Host	Star Maa	Also producer and creator
2025	Ishmart Jodi Season 3	Host	Star Maa	Also producer and creator
