= Raju Gari Gadhi 3 =

2019 Telugu horror thriller film by Ohmkar

- Theatrical release poster
- Directed by: Ohmkar
- Written by: Sai Madhav Burra(dialogues)
- Screenplay by: Ohmkar
- Story by: Rambhala
- Based on: Dhilluku Dhuddu 2
- Produced by: Kalyan Chakravarthy
- Starring: Ashwin Babu; Avika Gor
- Cinematography: Chota K. Naidu
- Edited by: Gautham Raju
- Music by: Shabir
- Production company: OAK Entertainments
- Release date: 18 October 2019
- Running time: 122 minutes
- Country: India
- Language: Telugu

Raju Gari Gadhi 3 is a 2019 Indian Telugu-language horror comedy film directed and produced by Ohmkar under banner of Oak Entertainmments. The film features Ashwin Babu and Avika Gor in the lead roles and has music composed by Shabir. The film is the third instalment in the Raju Garu Gadhi series that was created by Ohmkar. The cinematography was done by Chota K. Naidu and it was released on 18 October 2019. The film was made available on YouTube in Hindi in December 2019.

It is an official remake of Tamil movie Dhilluku Dhuddu 2.

== Plot ==
Ashwin and his maternal uncle are happy-go-lucky men whose drunken antics create a nuisance for their neighbours. The neighbours try out different methods to escape their antics, but in vain. One of the neighbours, who is a doctor by profession, comes across Maya, whom he is in love with. However, when he tries to express his love, he is beaten black and blue by a mysterious ghost. After finding out details about Maya and the ghost, the doctor and other neighbours plot against Ashwin to make him fall in love with Maya and let the ghost take care of him. Injured in a fight, Ashwin, seeking a physiotherapist's help, and him falling in love with Maya was engineered by his neighbours. Things take a twist, and Ashwin is thrashed by the ghost. He finds out that Maya's father Garudaraja Bhattadhri is a powerful magician in Kerala and that he had set the ghost to protect Maya. He sets out to Kerala to convince Maya's father, along with his uncle. They insult Bhattadhri, and he sets out to do a pooja to harm them. To escape that, they ask for Chakra Mahadevi's help. It turns out that both Bhattadhri and Mahadevi are fake and that there is a real ghost protecting Maya. They go to a black magician, where he reveals the flashback about the ghost. In 1857, a British man named George Williams came to India, where he seduced girls and ruined their lives.

Due to a transfer, he came to Kerala, where his lustful thoughts fell on Devyani Kutti, but he was unaware that she was the daughter of the king of black magic, Marthanda Varma. Soon, Marthanda Varma learned of George, so to kill George, he took the great Yatchi palm script on a pournami day and gave an order to Yatchi to protect his daughter. That night, George proposes to Devyani and at that moment, Yatchi killed George. After the Britishers left India, he stuffed Yatchi into an idol and buried it. After that, Maya's father says that he has a similar Yatchi in his house, so the magician performs pooja to find out whether it is active. To kill the Yatchi, they need to retrieve the palm script from the bungalow where Maya's father took the Yatchi. Ashwin and others had various encounters with other ghosts there, and then they finally retrieved the palm script and killed the ghost. The end credits show the wedding of Ashwin and Maya.

== Cast ==
- Ashwin Babu as Ashwin
- Avika Gor as Maya
- Urvashi as Rajamatha
- Ali as Ashwin's uncle
- Brahmaji as Doctor
- Ajay Ghosh as Garudaraja Pillai
- Prabhas Sreenu
- Hari Teja
- K. Sivasankar as Colony president
- Dhanraj
- Getup Srinu
- Sneha Gupta - Item Girl 1 ("Naa Gadhiloki Ra")
- Radhika S Mayadev - Item Girl 2 ("Naa Gadhiloki Ra")

== Music ==
Music for the film was composed by Shabir Sulthan, and features the song "Naa Gadhiloki Raa" with lyrics Sri Mani and performed by M. M. Manasi, Sri Vardhini, Thanushree Natarajan, Miraya Varma, LV Revanth and Shabir Sulthan. The other two songs, "Yeppudeppu" and "Macha Evarikkada", were reused from Dhilluku Dhuddu 2.

Track listing
No.	Title	Singer(s)	Length
1.	"Yeppudeppu"	Yazin Nizar, Shabir Sulthan	3:11
2.	"Macha Evarikkada"	Shabir Sulthan, Yamini	2:53
3.	"Naa Gadhiloki Raa"	M. M. Manasi, Sri Vardhini, Thanushree Natarajan, LV Revanth, Shabir Sulthan	3:31
Total length:			9:35

== Reception ==
The Times of India gave 2 out of 5 stars stating "Devoid of goosebump moments, the film makes do with humour".

== See also ==
- Highest-grossing Telugu franchises and film series
