= Jatha Kalise =

- Theatrical release poster
- Directed by: Rakesh Shashi
- Written by: Rakesh Shashi
- Produced by: Naresh Ravoori
- Starring: Ashwin Babu; Tejaswi Madivada
- Cinematography: Jagadeesh Cheekati
- Edited by: Karthika Srinivas
- Music by: Sai Karthik
- Production companies: Vaaraahi Chalana Chitram; Oak Entertainments Pvt. Ltd; Yukta Creations
- Release date: 25 December 2015
- Country: India
- Language: Telugu

Jatha Kalise is a 2015 Indian Telugu-language romantic drama film directed by Rakesh Shashi and starring Ashwin Babu and Tejaswi Madivada. The film's title is based on a song from Srimanthudu (2015). The film was released on 25 December 2015 to mixed reviews.

== Cast ==
- Ashwin Babu as Rishi
- Tejaswi Madivada as Tejaswi
- Prudhvi Raj
- Shakalaka Shankar
- Dhanraj
- Saptagiri
- Vidyullekha Raman
- Snigdha as a driver
- Viva Harsha as a hacker
- Surya

== Soundtrack ==
The music was composed by Sai Karthik.

- "Padipoyane"

== Reception ==
Jeevi of Idlebrain.com wrote that "It’s a romantic comedy that takes off well. It would have been good, if the same tempo in second half is maintained". A critic from Telugucinema.com rated the film 2.5/5 and wrote that "Watch this film if you think one line can be dragged on and on for no rhyme or reason".
