= Shakalaka Shankar =

Indian actor

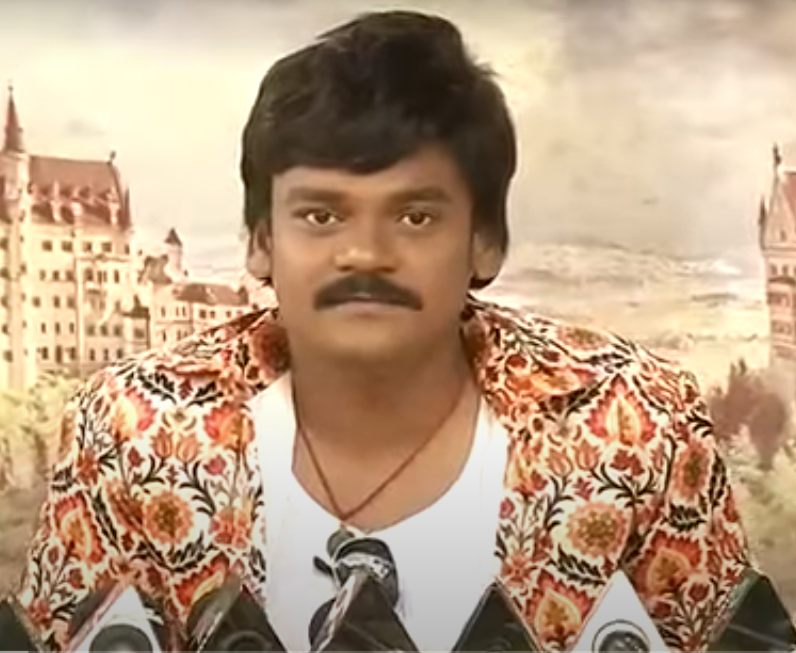
- Shankar in 2018
- Born: Seshu Shankar; Srikakulam, Andhra Pradesh, India
- Occupations: Film actor; comedian
- Years active: 2007–present
- Spouse: Parvathi (m. 2016)

Seshu Shankar, better known by his stage name Shakalaka Shankar, is an Indian actor who works in Telugu films. Known for his comic roles, Shankar is one of the highest paid Telugu film comedians in 2017.

== Career ==
Shankar dropped out of school in 10th standard and moved to Hyderabad in 2002 to pursue a career in films. Owing to lack of opportunities, he worked as painter for few years, and took up odd jobs in the film industry such as light-man and office boy.

Shankar got is first opportunity in Notebook (2007). He then went to feature in comedy show Jabardasth, where he gained recognition. Shankar subsequently moved on to films. In 2017, he starred in Anando Brahma which was a box office success. Regarding his role, a critic noted that "Shakalaka Shankar brings the house down when he mimics popular actors and their iconic dialogues to baffle the ghost".

He appeared in several comic roles before debuting as a lead actor with Shambho Shankara (2018). Later that year, he starred in Driver Ramudu, which is yet to release. He considers actor-politician Pawan Kalyan as his role model.

In 2020, Shankar played Ram Gopal Varma in the film Parannageevi. He is again reprising the role in Ram Gopal Varma's biopic. Two more films where Shankar appears in a lead role, Lord Grandfather and Bomma Adirindi - Dimma Tirigindi are also under production.

== Personal life ==
Shankar is born and brought up in Srikakulam district of Andhra Pradesh. In 2016, he married Parvathi.

== Filmography ==
Year	Title	Role	Notes
2007	Notebook		
2011	Kudirithe Kappu Coffee	Koti	
2014	Love You Bangaram	Songaseenu	credited as RGV Shanker
2014	Geethanjali	Shankar/Arudra	
2014	Loukyam	Student	
2014	Aagadu	Thief	
2015	Intelligent Idiots		
2015	Pataas	Police Officer	
2015	Sahasam Seyara Dimbaka	Ram Babu	
2015	Mosagallaku Mosagadu		
2015	Pandaga Chesko		
2015	Dhanalakshmi Talupu Tadite		
2015	Mirchi Lanti Kurradu		
2015	Bruce Lee: The Fighter	Director	
2015	Raju Gari Gadhi	M. Y. Danam	
2015	Bengal Tiger	Shankar	
2015	Sankarabharanam		
2015	Jatha Kalise	Kalyan Babu	
2016	Kavvintha		
2016	Veelaithe Premiddam		
2016	Express Raja	One of Raja's Teammate	
2016	Seethamma Andalu Ramayya Sitralu	Sri Ram's friend	
2016	Garam	Varalababu's friend	
2016	Savitri		
2016	Sardaar Gabbar Singh		
2016	Eedo Rakam Aado Rakam	Tenant	
2016	A Aa	Pratap	
2016	Right Right		
2016	Control C		
2016	Kundanapu Bomma		
2016	Premikudu		
2016	Selfie Raja	Mams's assistant	
2016	Banthi Poola Janaki		
2016	Eedu Gold Ehe	Ranga	
2016	Nandini Nursing Home	Naidu	
2016	Speedunnodu	Qadir	
2016	Chuttalabbai	Babji's friend	
2016	Naanna Nenu Naa Boyfriends	Thief	
2016	Saptagiri Express	Kaanipaakam	
2016	Intlo Deyyam Nakem Bhayam		
2017	Dwaraka		
2017	Gunturodu		
2017	Cine Mahal – Rojuki 4 Aatalu		
2017	Chinni Chinni Asalu Nalo Regene		
2017	Mister	Satyagrahi	
2017	Radha	Pardhu	
2017	Avanthika		
2017	Pelliki Mundu Prema Katha		
2017	Maya Mall		
2017	Anando Brahma	Babu	
2017	Raju Gari Gadhi 2	Bala Yesu	
2017	Sapthagiri LLB	Lawyer Shakala Shankar	
2017	B.Tech Babulu		
2018	Ego	Shankar	
2018	Soda Golisoda		
2018	Raa Raa	Bumper Star	
2018	Ammammagarillu	Santhosh's Friend	
2018	Raju Gadu		
2018	Desamudurs		
2018	Jamba Lakidi Pamba		
2018	Shambho Shankara	Shankar	Debut in a lead role
2018	Savyasachi	Sathi Babu Lavangam	
2018	Amar Akbar Anthony		
2019	Nene Kedi No. 1	Jackie	
2019	Bhagyanagara Veedullo Gamattu	Peter	
2020	3 Monkeys	Bali	
2020	Parannajeevi	Ram Gopal Varma	
2021	Akshara	Suriya	
2021	Gully Rowdy	Ullipayalu Upma	
2022	Raajahyogam	Jump	
2023	Waltair Veerayya	Samba	
2023	Unstoppable	Honey	
2023	Dalari	Abhi	
2024	Shivam Bhaje		
2024	Geethanjali Malli Vachindi	Shankar / Arudra	
2024	OMG: O Manchi Ghost	Pavuram	
2024	Naa Saami Ranga	Bhaskar’s brother-in-law	
2025	LYF: Love Your Father		
2026	Trimukha	Don Seenu	
2026	Suvarna		
2026	Garividi Lakshmi		

=== Television ===
- Jabardasth
- Extra Jabardasth

== Awards and nominations ==
Year	Award	Category	Work	Result	Ref.
2018	Zee Golden Awards	Best Actor in a Comedic Role	Anando Brahma	Won	
2018	South Indian International Movie Awards	Best Comedian (Telugu)	Anando Brahma	Nominated	
