= Vidyullekha Raman =

Indian actress

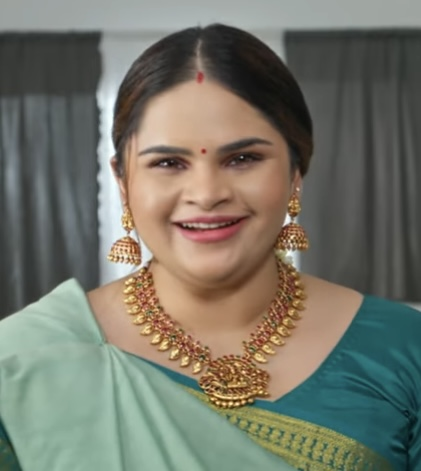
- Vidyullekha in 2024
- Born: 4 November 1991 (age 34); Chennai, Tamil Nadu, India
- Other name: Vidyu
- Occupations: Actress; comedian
- Years active: 2012–present
- Spouse: Sanjay (m. 2021)
- Parent: Mohan Raman (father)

Vidyullekha Raman (born 4 November 1991), also known as Vidyu Raman, is an Indian actress and comedian who appears in Tamil and Telugu films. The daughter of actor Mohan Raman, Vidyullekha made her debut in Gautham Vasudev Menon's 2012 Neethaane En Ponvasantham. She won the Nandi Award for Best Female Comedian for the film Run Raja Run (2014).

== Early life and career ==
Vidyullekha did her schooling in Vidya Mandir Senior Secondary School and later went to MCTM Matriculation, where she developed an interest in theatre and acting. She gained her popularity doing stage productions during her college years at M.O.P. Vaishnav College, where she graduated with a degree in Visual Communication.

She has over 7 years of theater experience. She made her debut in Gautham Vasudev Menon's 2012 bilingual films Neethaane En Ponvasantham and Yeto Vellipoyindhi Manasu, appearing as Jenny, a friend of the character portrayed by Samantha. The actress has since played pivotal roles opposite N. Santhanam in Sundar C's Theeya Velai Seiyyanum Kumaru, in Malini 22 Palayamkottai and the Telugu film Ramayya Vasthavayya. She was seen in minor roles in both 2014 Pongal releases Jilla and Veeram. She has since then shifted her base to the Telugu film industry. She emerged as the 3rd runner up in the cooking comedy show Cooku with Comali season 3.

== Personal life ==
The actress is the daughter of Indian Tamil actor Mohan Raman, while her grandfather was lawyer V. P. Raman. Another uncle, P. S. Raman, was the former Advocate General of Tamil Nadu. Her cousin Gitanjali is married to Tamil filmmaker Selvaraghavan.

Raman got engaged to Sanjay on 26 August 2020 and announced it on Instagram. The couple got married on September 9, 2021, in an intimate ceremony.

== Filmography ==
Year	Film	Role	Language	Notes
2012	Neethaane En Ponvasantham	Jenny	Tamil	Nominated, Vijay Award for Best Supporting Actress
2012	Yeto Vellipoyindhi Manasu	Jenny	Telugu	
2013	Theeya Velai Seiyyanum Kumaru	Sanjana's friend	Tamil	Nominated, SIIMA Award Best Comedian
2013	Ramayya Vasthavayya	Asha Jyothi	Telugu	
2014	Jilla	Police	Tamil	
2014	Malini 22 Palayamkottai	Shalini	Tamil	
2014	Veeram	Alamelu	Tamil	Won - Edison Award for Best Comedian Female
2014	Run Raja Run	Maggie a.k.a. Bujjima	Telugu	Won - Nandi Award for Best Female Comedian
2014	Weekend Love		Telugu	
2015	Kaaki Sattai	Hospital Staff	Tamil	
2015	Masss	Julie	Tamil	
2015	Inimey Ippadithaan	Seenu's cousin	Tamil	
2015	Vasuvum Saravananum Onna Padichavanga	'Tuner' Kousalya	Tamil	
2015	Puli	Kamatchi	Tamil	
2015	Vedalam	Esther	Tamil	
2015	Dynamite	Shivaji's Friend	Telugu	
2015	Raju Gari Gadhi	Bujjiamma	Telugu	
2015	Bhale Manchi Roju	Deepti	Telugu	
2015	Jatha Kalise		Telugu	
2016	Speedunnodu	Vasanti's friend	Telugu	
2016	Mapla Singam	Selvi	Tamil	
2016	Sarrainodu	Tamizh Selvi	Telugu	Won, Best Female Comedian Award at 15th Santosham Film Awards
2016	Wagah	Juhi	Tamil	
2016	Meendum Oru Kadhal Kathai	Hamzah	Tamil	
2016	Ghatana	Shalini	Telugu	
2016	Dhruva	Ishika's friend	Telugu	
2016	Meelo Evaru Koteeswarudu	Priya's friend	Telugu	
2017	Power Paandi	Poongodi	Tamil	
2017	Duvvada Jagannadham	Katyayini alias Katyu	Telugu	
2017	Ninnu Kori	Kavitha	Telugu	
2017	Goutham Nanda	Spoorthi's Friend	Telugu	
2017	Anando Brahma	Fake Ghost	Telugu	
2017	Raju Gari Gadhi 2	Bellam Sridevi	Telugu	
2017	Raja The Great	Pandu	Telugu	
2018	Bhaagamathie	Police Constable	Telugu	Bilingual film
2018	Bhaagamathie	Police Constable	Tamil	Bilingual film
2018	Inttelligent	Sathya Murthy's daughter	Telugu	
2018	Tholi Prema	Godavari	Telugu	
2018	Raambo 2	Sheela	Kannada	
2018	Krishnarjuna Yudham	Callcenter girl	Telugu	
2018	Achari America Yatra	Renuka's friend	Telugu	
2018	Panjumittai		Tamil	
2018	Chi La Sow	Anu	Telugu	
2018	Srinivasa Kalyanam	Bujji	Telugu	
2018	Paper Boy		Telugu	
2018	Savyasachi	Tulasi Prasad	Telugu	
2018	Howrah Bridge	Saroja	Telugu	
2019	Mr. Majnu	Linda	Telugu	
2019	4 Letters		Telugu	
2019	Maharshi	Pooja's friend	Telugu	
2019	Seven	Karthik's coworker	Telugu	Bilingual film
2019	Seven	Karthik's coworker	Tamil	Bilingual film
2019	Viswamitra	Bujji	Telugu	
2019	RDX Love	Alivelu's friend	Telugu	
2019	Arjun Suravaram	Balaji's maid	Telugu	
2019	Venky Mama	Candy	Telugu	
2019	Mathu Vadalara	Bujji	Telugu	
2021	Alludu Adhurs	Koumudi's friend	Telugu	
2021	Gully Rowdy	Forensic Expert Ramba	Telugu	
2021	Thalli Pogathey	Nisha	Tamil	
2021	Thanne Vandi		Tamil	
2022	Aattral	Kavya's friend	Tamil	
2022	Happy Birthday	QT	Telugu	
2023	Boo	Kavya	Tamil	Bilingual film
2023	Boo	Kavya	Telugu	Bilingual film
2023	Hidimba	Police Officer	Telugu	
2025	Kadhalikka Neramillai	Receptionist	Tamil	
2025	The Verdict		Tamil	
2025	Meghalu Cheppina Prema Katha	Komali	Telugu	

=== Streaming television ===
Year	Series	Role	Language	Network	Notes
2023	Mansion 24	Nurse Bujji	Telugu	Disney+Hotstar	Web debut

== Television ==
Year	Show	Channel	Notes
2022	Cooku with Comali 3	Star Vijay	3rd Runner Up
2023	Super Queen Season -2	Zee Telugu	TBA
