= Ashwin Babu =

Indian actor

- Born: 1 August 1985 (age 41); Tenali, Andhra Pradesh, India
- Occupations: Actor, doctor
- Years active: 2012–present
- Relatives: Ohmkar (brother)

Dr. Ashwin Babu Nuthalapati MBBS (born 1 August 1985) is an Indian actor who primarily works in Telugu films and a medical doctor. He made his acting debut in the 2012 film, Genius. He is a frequent collaborator with his brother Ohmkar.

== Career ==
Ashwin made his debut in 2012 with a lead role in Telugu film Genius directed by his brother Ohmkar. In 2015, he was seen in Raju Gari Gadhi and Jatha Kalise. In 2017 Ashwin starred in Raju Gari Gadhi 2 and subsequently in Raju Gari Gadhi 3. In 2023, he starred in the medical thriller Hidimbha. His last film, Shivam Bhaje, was released theatrically on 1 August 2024.

He graduated in M.B.B.S from Rangaraya medical college, a public government medical college in Kakinada, Andhra Pradesh.

== Filmography ==
Year	Title	Role	Notes	Ref.
2012	Genius	Yasir		
2015	Raju Gari Gadhi	Ashwin		
2015	Jatha Kalise	Rishi		
2016	Naanna Nenu Naa Boyfriends	Nani		
2017	Raju Gari Gadhi 2	Ashwin		
2019	Raju Gari Gadhi 3	Ashwin		
2023	Hidimbha	Abhay alias Joseph Thomas		
2024	Shivam Bhaje	N. Chandra Sekhar "Chandu"		
