= Dhanraj Koranani =

Indian comedian

Dhanraj
- Born: Tadepalligudem, Andhra Pradesh, India
- Occupations: Actor, director
- Years active: 2004-present
- Television: Jabardasth
- Spouse: Sirisha

Dhanraj Koranani is an Indian actor and comedian who works in Telugu cinema and television.

== Career ==
He started his career in films with Teja film, Jai. Dhanraj entered the film industry with only four hundred rupees, leaving his hometown and parents without notice. He worked in a hotel in Hyderabad and attended acting school. He was leading a team "Dhanadhan Dhanraj" in a popular TV comedy-show Jabardasth telecast on ETV.

Dhanraj played opposite Lakshmi Manchu in the unreleased film, Pilavani Perantam. Dhanraj participated in Telugu reality series Bigg Boss 1. He got eliminated in the 6th week. He was team leader of "Dhanraj Blasters" in the comedy-show Adhirindhi on Zee Telugu. He made his directorial debut with Ramam Raghavam.

== Filmography ==
=== Telugu films ===
==== As actor ====
- Jai (2004)
- Godava (2007)
- Jagadam (2007)
- Yuvatha (2008)
- Parugu (2008)
- Pellikaani Prasad (2008)
- Vaade Kaavali (2009)
- Saarai Veerraju (2009)
- Adugu (2009)
- Gopi Gopika Godavari (2009)
- Bheemili Kabaddi Jattu (2010)
- Pilla Zamindar (2011)
- Madatha Kaja (2011)
- Nakoo O Loverundi (2011)
- Nenu Nanna Abaddam (2011)
- Ala Modalaindi (2011)
- Ayyare (2012)
- Poola Rangadu (2012)
- Mem Vayasuku Vacham (2012)
- Housefull (2012)
- Eega (2012)
- Gabbar Singh (2012)
- Cameraman Gangatho Rambabu (2012)
- Vennela 1½ (2012)
- Adda (2013)
- Abbai Class Ammai Mass (2013)
- Jaffa (2013) as Sujith
- Aha Naa Premanta (2013)
- Priyathama Neevachata Kushalama (2013)
- Athadu Aame O Scooter (2013)
- Sukumarudu (2013)
- Attarintiki Daredi (2013)
- Dalam (2013)
- Music Magic (2013)
- Vintha Katha (2014)
- Basanti (2014)
- Nenu Nene Ramune (2014)
- Hrudayam Ekkadunnadi (2014)
- Bhoo (2014)
- Naa Karma Kaali Poyindi (2014)
- AK Rao PK Rao (2014)
- Jump Jilani (2014)
- Ee Varsham Sakshiga (2014)
- Gopala Gopala (2015)
- Raju Gari Gadhi (2015)
- Bham Bolenath (2015)
- Jyothi Lakshmi (2015)
- Dhanalaxmi Thalupu Thadithe (2015)
- Jatha Kalise (2015)
- Express Raja (2016)
- Parvathipuram (2016) (dubbed in 2023 as Veera Khadgam)
- Manamantha (2016)
- Banthi Poola Janaki (2016)
- Ekkadiki Pothavu Chinnavada (2016)
- Meelo Evaru Koteeswarudu (2016)
- Naanna Nenu Naa Boyfriends (2016)
- Devi Sri Prasad (2017)
- Nagamani (2017)
- London Babulu (2017)
- C/o Surya (2017)
- Oye Ninne (2017)
- Bhaagamathie (2018)
- Hyderabad Love Story (2018)
- Seven (2019)
- Kathanam (2019)
- Sivaranjani (2019)
- Oh! Baby (2019)
- Bhagyanagara Veedullo Gamattu (2019; co-producer)
- Power Play (2021)
- Induvadana (2022)
- Bujji Ila Raa (2022)
- Anukoni Prayanam (2022)
- Bhuvana Vijayam (2023)
- Vimanam (2023)
- Keshava Chandra Ramavath (2024)
- Bachchala Malli (2024)
- Ramam Raghavam (2025)
- Sampradayini Suppini Suddapoosani (2026)

==== As director ====
- Ramam Raghavam (2025); also actor

=== Other language films ===
- FM Fun Aur Masti (2007) (Dakhini)
- Odipolama (2009) (Tamil)
- Naan Ee (2012) (Tamil)
- Koottam (2014) (Tamil)
- Durgamati (2020) (Hindi)

=== Television ===
List of television shows and roles
Year	Title	Role	Network
2013–2016	Jabardasth	Team Leader	ETV
2017	Bigg Boss 1	Contestant	Star Maa
2019–2020	Adhirindi	Team Leader	Zee Telugu
2022	Comedy Stars	Team leader	Star Maa
