= Love Oh Love (film) =

2026 film directed by Magesh Rajendran

- Theatrical release poster
- Directed by: Magesh Rajendran
- Written by: Magesh Rajendran
- Produced by: Dinesh Raj; G. Dhananjheyan
- Starring: Pavish Narayan; Naga Durga; Selvaraghavan; K. S. Ravikumar; Vanitha Vijayakumar
- Cinematography: P. G. Muthiah
- Edited by: N. B. Srikanth
- Music by: Songs: FoxN; Score: Osho Venkat; FoxN
- Production companies: Zinema Media and Entertainment Limited; Creative Entertainers & Distributors
- Distributed by: Phars Film; Tentkotta
- Release date: 10 July 2026
- Running time: 130 minutes
- Country: India
- Language: Tamil

Love Oh Love is an 2026 Tamil-language romantic comedy film written and directed by Magesh Rajendran in his directorial debut and produced by Zinema Media and Entertainment Limited and Creative Entertainers & Distributors. The film stars Pavish Narayan, Naga Durga, Selvaraghavan, K. S. Ravikumar and Vanitha Vijayakumar in lead roles.

The film was officially announced in October 2025 under the tentative title Production No.1, as it is the first production of Zinema Media and Entertainment Limited, and the official title was announced in November 2025. The film has music and background score by FoxN and Osho Venkat, cinematography handled by P. G. Muthiah and editing by N. B. Srikanth.

Love Oh Love was released in theatres on 10 July 2026 and received mixed reviews from critics and became a box office failure.

== Plot ==
Raghuvaran "Raghu" is a debt-ridden corporate employee whose life spirals out of control due to his materialistic girlfriend, Avantika. He challenges her to step into his shoes and handle the relationship for four months to understand his struggles.

== Cast ==
- Pavish Narayan as Raghuvaran "Raghu"
- Naga Durga as Avantika (Voice dubbed by Ishwarya Baaskar)
- Selvaraghavan as Inspector Harichandran
- K. S. Ravikumar as Rajendran, Raghu and Kavitha's father
- Vanitha Vijayakumar as Lekha
- Ramya Ramakrishna as Raadhika, Avantika's mother
- Ashwath Venkatesh as Tatoo, Raghu's friend
- Soundarya Saravanan as Shanthi, Raghu and Kavitha's mother
- Adithya Kathir as Maaran
- Anusrivelan as Merlin, Avantika's friend
- Sharmila Aziza as Avantika's friend
- Shashaa Shivakumar as Kavitha, Raghu's sister
- Mani Chandra (guest appearance in "Love Panna" song)

== Production ==
Love Oh Love is the directorial debut of Magesh Rajendran, who previously worked as an assistant director to Lakshman in Bogan (2017) and Bhoomi (2021). The project was officially announced in October 2025 and the release of its first-look poster on March 2026 by Vijay Sethupathi and Arya.

The film stars Pavish Narayan, marking his second film as a lead after his lead debut in Nilavuku En Mel Ennadi Kobam (2025). Popular Telugu YouTuber Naga Durga was cast as the female lead, making her acting debut in Tamil.

Principal photography began on 27 October 2025. The title Love Oh Love was announced in mid-November. Principal photography wrapped on 29 April 2026. The film was primarily shot in Chennai and to a lesser extent in Ooty.

== Music ==
Love Oh Love

Soundtrack album by FoxN and Osho Venkat
- Recorded: 2026
- Genre: Feature film soundtrack
- Language: Tamil
- Labels: Think Music; Lucky Audio
- Producers: FoxN; Osho Venkat

FoxN chronology
Parimala and Co (2026)	Love Oh Love (2026)	Almost Nallavan (TBA)

Osho Venkat chronology
Mr. Housekeeping (2025)	Love Oh Love (2026)

Singles from Love Oh Love
- 1. "Broke Boy" Released: 19 June 2026; 2. "Sakura Nikura" Released: 1 July 2026; 3. "Vaadi Chellakutty" Released: 7 July 2026

The music and background score is composed by FoxN and Osho Venkat, in his maiden collaboration with Pavish Narayan and Magesh Rajendran. The audio rights were acquired by Think Music and Lucky Audio. The first single titled "Broke Boy" was released on 19 June 2026. The pre-release audio launch event was held on 26 June 2026. The second single titled "Sakura Nikura" was released on 1 July 2026. The third single titled "Vaadi Chellakutty" was released on 7 July 2026, which was reused from "Vaadi Pottapulla Veliye" from Kaalam Maari Pochu (1996) originally composed by Deva.

Track listing
No.	Title	Lyrics	Singer(s)	Length
1.	"Broke Boy"	Pradeep PJ; Jothi Kanna	Pradeep PJ	3:16
2.	"Sakura Nikura"	Pradeep PJ; VARUN; Madras Miran	Pradeep PJ	3:06
3.	"Vaadi Chellakutty"	Vaali	Mysskin; Vadivelu; VARUN	3:05
4.	"Naan Yaaro"	LRC	Sony Daffodil	3:37
5.	"Love Panna"	Varma	Sarah Black	2:37
6.	"Naan Yaaro" (Reprise)	Pradeep PJ	Pradeep PJ	2:19

== Release ==
=== Theatrical ===
Love Oh Love was released in theatres on 10 July 2026.

=== Home media ===
The post-theatrical digital streaming rights were acquired by Amazon Prime Video.

== Reception ==
=== Critical response ===
Love Oh Love received mixed reviews from critics.

Abhinav Subramanian of The Times of India gave 2.5/5 stars and wrote, "Love Oh Love preaches balance to its couple while never quite finding its own, caught somewhere between making points and telling a story". Akshay Kumar of Cinema Express gave 1.5/5 stars and wrote, "Love Oh Love feels like a Devathaiyai Kanden–meets–Vallavan romance that barely scratches the surface, yet makes no real attempt to capture the emotional heft of either film. It's not often that you're made to sit through a love story so thoroughly unlovable, one that mindlessly stacks up familiar tropes inanimately. The film moves with the mechanical ease of lending and repaying loans, similar to its plot, and is evidently devoid of warmth".
