= Odela 2 =

2025 film by Ashok Teja

- Theatrical release poster
- Directed by: Ashok Teja
- Written by: Sampath Nandi
- Produced by: D. Madhu; Sampath Nandi
- Starring: Tamannaah Bhatia; Hebah Patel; Vasishta N. Simha
- Cinematography: Soundararajan
- Edited by: Avinash
- Music by: B. Ajaneesh Loknath
- Production companies: Madhu Creations; Sampath Nandi Teamworks
- Release date: 17 April 2025
- Running time: 150 minutes
- Country: India
- Language: Telugu
- Budget: ₹25 crore (US$2.6 million)
- Box office: ₹7.07 crore (US$730,000)

Odela 2 is a 2025 Telugu-language, Indian supernatural thriller film directed by Ashok Teja and written by Sampath Nandi. The film stars Tamannaah Bhatia, Hebah Patel, Vasishta N. Simha in lead roles. Produced by D. Madhu and Sampath Nandi, with cinematography by Soundararajan and music composed by B. Ajaneesh Loknath, this movie is sequel to Odela Railway Station (2022) centers on the fictional village of the same name. The film portrays how Odela Mallanna Swamy protects his village from evil forces. This movie garnered mixed reviews from critics and received heavy backlash for its poor storyline and direction. The film underperformed at box office.

== Plot ==
A schoolgirl is shown walking down the railway track, seemingly possessed and carrying Radha's head, and she walks to the police station, terrifying everyone.

In the village of Odela, Telangana, the gruesome legacy of serial rapist and murderer Tirupati lingers after his beheading at the hands of his wife, Radha (from the first film). Following his execution, the villagers, fearing his malevolent influence, perform a ritual called Samadhi Shiksha, sealing his corpse instead of cremating it. This improper burial prevents Tirupati's soul from attaining moksha, transforming him into a vengeful evil spirit that returns six months later to terrorise the village. His spirit possesses men and resumes a horrific spree of rapes and murders, targeting newlywed brides, plunging Odela into fear and chaos again. He possesses the village pandit to brutally rape and murder one of the brides on her wedding night, and possesses the village sarpanch to do the same on another bride's wedding night, which was in a maize field, just as brutal and bone-chilling.

As the village grapples with the escalating supernatural threat, the villagers turn to Radha, now imprisoned for killing Tirupati for guidance. Radha reveals the existence of her estranged sister, Bhairavi, a powerful Nāga Sadhu and devotee of Lord Shiva, who left home in childhood to pursue a divine path. Known as Shiva Shakti, Bhairavi has been chanting "Om Namah Shivaya" 110 crore times to attain the divine darshan of Lord Shiva, living as an ascetic guarded by a sacred snake.

After a great amount of pleading, she decides to come to Odela. Bhairavi arrives in Odela just before the film's interval, her dramatic entrance, where she beats up and probably kills several drunk, cruel men who were beating and trying to kill some innocent cows, raising hopes of salvation among Odela's villagefolk. She confronts the spirit's chaos, uncovering that Tirupati's malevolent force is manipulating the village's men to perpetuate his crimes. With the aid of a local Muslim baba Allah Bakshu (Murali Sharma), who strangely quotes and has great knowledge of Hindu scriptures, Bhairavi performs rituals to weaken the spirit's hold. The narrative delves into themes of Shiva Tattva and divine energy, portraying Bhairavi as a mythical force destined to restore order.

Some journalists come from the city to report on the state of Odela. They accidentally crash-land a drone on Tirupati's grave. During the day, the villager on guard chases them away, but at night, one of them goes in to retrieve the drone, gets cut on the barbed wire strung around the grave, and bleeds on the grave, causing Tirupati's spirit to awaken. The spirit goes to Bhairavi, with the intention of raping her. However, she is saved by the sacred snake which protects her. Bhairavi and Tirupati have a confrontation on the outskirts of the village, at end of which both leave with threats to each other.

As the battle intensifies, Bhairavi faces challenges in rallying the superstitious villagers, who are torn between fear of the spirit and reliance on sorcerers and fakirs. Tirupati's spirit unleashes a whirlwind of terror, including a visceral “viswaroopam” manifestation, pushing the village to the brink. He reveals that he has worshipped the Devil, and now controls the 5 elements: earth, fire, water, air and sky. He draws a border around Odela: any living being, human or animal or bird, who crosses the line is brutally killed. He forbids anyone from going to school, hospital or work, says that no crop will grow, vowing to turn Odela into a graveyard.

However, a villager's daughter has severe asthma, and they can't cross the line to reach the hospital situated outside Odela. They rush her to Bhairavi, who says that her sister Radha, who has been released from prison, can save the young girl, as Radha was Tirupati's wife, and according to Bhairavi, "the bond of marriage" is the strongest of all. While Radha dresses up and goes to Tirupati's grave to distract him, Bhairavi chants "Om Namah Shivaya" on loudspeaker to keep his spirit weak, which will weaken the line. However, a sandstorm starts (probably by Tirupati) and the electricity is cut off just as the asthmatic girl's father is about to cross the line. This causes the loudspeaker broadcast to be stopped, and Tirupati arises again. He possesses the girl, cuts off Radha's head and walks with it down the railway track to the police station, just as she did with his head in the prequel. This scene is a callback to the starting scene of this film.

When Radha's body is being burnt, Tirupati's spirit appears before Bhairavi. He tells her that he will spare the village if she gives up her celibacy and devotion to Lord Shiva, marries him and lets him "have her body". Seeing no other way, she agrees. He tells her to dress up as a bride and come to him. The villagers try to stop her, telling her "there is no God", but she is adamant. Before leaving to dress up, she looks at the local Muslim baba (Murali Sharma) and tells him "Om Namah Shivaya" and her hand gesture indicated "Kapalmoksha", attaining which will free Tirupati's soul from the mortal realm. As Tirupati's spirit, possessing a local man's body, goes to rape and murder Bhairavi, the baba and a few other men start digging up Tirupati's body, as a festival is arranged in the village. Tirupati realises that Bhairavi has planned something, and throws her in front of the Odela Mallanna Swamy temple, where the festival was ongoing, saying that "all will watch what he does to her". She keeps chanting "Om Namah Shivaya" to complete 110 crore, and this infuriates him, leading him to brutally attacking her again and again.

Finally, she passes out when she has just one chant left to complete. A brave young girl goes to the statue of Nandi in the temple and whispers into its ear, begging Lord Shiva to come and save Bhairavi. Nandi awakens and breathes life into Bhairavi, who completes her 110 crore chants with a final "Om Namah Shivaya". As a result, Bhairavi too gains control over the five elements and Lord Shiva Himself appears before all present, and gives his divine Trishul (trident) to Bhairavi, who uses it to destroy Tirupati, who was chanting evil mantras to choke the life out of all villagers of Odela. At the same time, the baba and the other men with him have dug up and burnt Tirupati's remains in a pyre, so that his spirit can attain "Kapalmoksha" and be vanquished from the mortal realm. After this, Bhairavi leaves Odela to continue her ascetic lifestyle.

The film concludes with a hint of a potential third installment, as Tirupati's bicycle is shown roaming the village streets with no rider on it, as it did in this film when he stalked a target, suggesting that the battle between good and evil in Odela may not be fully resolved.

== Cast ==
- Tamannaah Bhatia as Bhairavi
- Hebah Patel as Radha
- Vasishta N. Simha as Tirupati, Radha's husband
- Murali Sharma as Allah Bakshu
- Sharath Lohitashwa
- Yuva
- Naga Mahesh
- Vamsi
- Gagan Vihari
- Surender Reddy
- Srikanth Iyengar as priest
- Bhupal
- Shafi as reporter
- Pooja Reddy Bora as Yamini
- Kriss Venugopal as Guru
- Rahul Ravi as Venkatesh

== Production ==
=== Development ===
In March 2024, filmmaker Sampath Nandi announced on social media his second collaboration with director Ashok Teja, titled Odela 2. The film is a supernatural thriller and serves as a sequel to Odela Railway Station. Tamannaah Bhatia was selected for the lead role. Hebah Patel and Vasishta N. Simha were retained from the prequel and cast in pivotal roles. The additional cast includes Yuva, Murali Sharma, Sharath Lohitashwa, Srikanth Iyengar, Naga Mahesh, Vamshi, Gagan Vihari, Surender Reddy, Bhupal and Pooja Reddy.

=== Filming ===
The principal photography began on 1 March 2024 at Varanasi. In June, a major action sequence featuring Bhatia, who underwent rigorous training and rehearsals for the role, was filmed in Hyderabad. In July, the climax was shot at a set of the Odela Mallanna temple created at Ramoji Film City, featuring the main cast and 800 junior artists. Filming wrapped in October 2024, with post-production focusing on visual effects to enhance the supernatural elements. The Central Board of Film Certification (CBFC) granted the film an A rating due to its intense supernatural and violent content and has a runtime of 150 minutes.

== Music ==
The film's soundtrack and background score were composed by B. Ajaneesh Loknath, known for his work on Kantara. The music complements the film's supernatural and spiritual themes, incorporating traditional Telugu folk elements and devotional motifs. The single "Yemulada Rajanna," featuring vocals by Aniruddha Sastry and lyrics by Sampath Nandi, was released at a promotional event in Hyderabad, emphasizing the divine aura of Odela Mallanna Swamy. Another track, "Giya Giya Joy of Odela," was released post-launch, adding to the film's festive and cultural vibe.

Track listing
No.	Title	Lyrics	Music	Singer(s)	Length
1.	"Yemulada Rajanna"	Sampath Nandi	B. Ajaneesh Loknath	Aniruddha Sastry	3:32
2.	"Giya Giya Joy of Odela"	Suddala Ashok Teja	B. Ajaneesh Loknath	Sri Krishna	4:28

Title Giya Giya (Hindi Version) Singer Sunil Anand

== Marketing ==
Promotional activities began with a first-look poster in March 2024, followed by a teaser launched at the Maha Kumbh Mela in Prayagraj on 22 February 2025, highlighting Bhatia's transformation into character. A new poster featuring Bhatia's blood-soaked character was released on 22 March 2025, alongside the official release date announcement.

== Release ==
Odela 2 was released on 17 April 2025. The film began streaming on Amazon Prime Video from 8 May 2025.

== Reception ==
Paul Nicodemus of The Times of India gave the film two and a half out of five stars, noting, "Tamannaah shines in an eerie but uneven spiritual thriller." He described it as a horror thriller with a captivating village atmosphere and strong performances, especially by Tamannaah Bhatia, enhanced by Soundararajan's moody cinematography. However, its impact fades due to a sluggish second half and reliance on familiar horror tropes. Aditya Devulapally of Cinema Express rated the film one and a half out of five stars, stating, "A spiritual horror film that’s less horror, more havoc." He characterized it as a visually striking film with occasional effective VFX and intense moments from Tamannaah Bhatia and Vasishta N. Simha. Yet, its narrative coherence falters under Ashok Teja's direction, weighed down by a poorly structured script and excessive violence.

Avinash Ramachandran of The Indian Express assigned the film two out of five stars, commenting, "Tamannaah Bhatia shoulders a shaky sequel that needed more sensitivity and sensibility." He outlined it as a supernatural thriller with an initially promising premise and strong early performance by Tamannaah Bhatia, undermined by repetitive, perverse violence. The film's lackluster narrative, thinly written characters, and reliance on B. Ajaneesh Loknath’s overbearing score fail to maintain engagement under Ashok Teja’s direction. Srivathsan Nadadhur of The Hindu critiqued the film, observing, "Tamannaah Bhatia cannot salvage this outdated Telugu sequel." He viewed it as a supernatural thriller with visually engaging sequences, driven by Tamannaah Bhatia's presence and Ashok Teja's mythological focus. Still, its conventional narrative, underwritten characters, and overemphasis on gore curb its impact.

Sushmita Dey of Times Now gave the film two and a half out of five stars, stating, "Even Tamannaah Bhatia's Performance Can't Save This Underwhelming Supernatural Thriller." She depicted it as a visually appealing supernatural thriller with effective background music by Ajaneesh Loknath and a committed performance by Tamannaah Bhatia. However, its weak screenplay and slow pacing under Ashok Teja's direction lead to a lack of genuine thrills and emotional depth. Arjun Menon of Rediff.com rated the film one and a half out of five stars, noting, "Tamannaah Rises Above Campy Horror." He described it as a visually vibrant supernatural thriller, elevated by Tamannaah Bhatia's commanding performance and Soundararajan's dynamic cinematography. Yet, Ashok Teja's direction and a simplistic screenplay result in a loud, emotionally shallow narrative that fails to fulfill its pulpy ghost story potential.
