= Bhoomi (2021 film) =

2021 film written and directed by Lakshman

- Official release poster
- Directed by: Lakshman
- Written by: Lakshman
- Produced by: Sujatha Vijayakumar
- Starring: Ravi Mohan; Nidhhi Agerwal; Ronit Roy
- Cinematography: Dudley
- Edited by: Ruben; John Abraham
- Music by: D. Imman
- Production companies: Home Movie Makers; Yarco Entertainment
- Distributed by: Disney+ Hotstar
- Release date: 14 January 2021
- Running time: 130 minutes
- Country: India
- Language: Tamil

Bhoomi (transl. Earth) is a 2021 Indian Tamil-language action drama film, written and directed by Lakshman. This film is produced by Ravi Mohan's former mother-in-law Sujatha Vijayakumar under the production banner Home Movie Makers. The film stars Ravi Mohan and Nidhhi Agerwal, with Ronit Roy and Sathish in supporting roles. It is loosely based on various WhatsApp forwards. The soundtrack and background score was composed by D. Imman. This marks the 25th film for Ravi.

The film began streaming on Disney+ Hotstar on 14 January 2021 coinciding with Pongal. The film received negative reviews from critics and audiences.

== Plot ==
Bhoominathan is a NASA scientist who discovers that plant life can exist on Mars by adjusting certain anaerobic conditions needed for survival. He is highly praised by his peers for his discovery. While on a one-month vacation in Tamil Nadu, he discovers that his village is affected by drought and the underwater reservoir of his land has been drained away for futile purposes by certain corporations. He's also dismayed to find out that his uncle, who is an agriculturalist, is burdened with farm debts due to the scarcity of water supply in his village. His uncle had tried to sort out this issue rigorously with the local MLA, the district collector and the governing body but in vain, and eventually, he succumbs to the pressure by burning himself.

Unable to withstand the grief over the death of his uncle, Bhoominathan vows to get revenge on Richard Child, the chief of the leading corporate, by summoning him to the court of law. Still, his attempts go unrecognised before the villain's money and might. However, Bhoominathan decides to fight it out in an intelligent way by gaining the trust of his village people and by starting his own trusted corporate 'Thamizhan' by the village people and the corporate company's former employees, despite facing many obstacles. Finally, he succeeds in his attempts and reclaims and replenishes his land using the knowledge of his hybrid plant technology that he had learnt in the past and saves his land and his people from drought.

== Cast ==
- Ravi Mohan as Bhoominathan
- Nidhhi Agerwal as Shakthi
- Ronit Roy as Richard Child, the clichéd corporate villain
- Radha Ravi as the Minister of Agriculture
- Thambi Ramaiah as Velusamy
- Saranya Ponvannan as Bhoominathan's mother
- Sathish as Bhoominathan's friend
- John Vijay as Ekambaram, the district collector
- G. Marimuthu as Gnanasambandam
- Yaanai Joke Kathir as Kathir
- Sethupathi Jayachandran as Inspector Pandiarajan
- B. Ashok Kumar as Ashok
- G. P. Muthu as G. P. Muthu
- R. S. G. Chelladurai
- R. N. R. Manohar as the judge
- Snehan as a show host

== Production ==
The film project marks the third collaboration between Ravi Mohan and director Lakshman after Romeo Juliet (2015) and Bogan (2017). The film also marks the Kollywood debut for Ronit Roy.

== Soundtrack ==
Bhoomi

Soundtrack album by D. Imman
- Released: 2021
- Recorded: 2020
- Venue: Chennai
- Studio: D.Imman’s Sound Factory
- Genre: Feature film soundtrack
- Length: 20:58
- Label: Sony Music India
- Producer: D. Imman

D. Imman chronology
Seeru (2020)	Bhoomi (2021)	Teddy (2021)

The music is composed by D. Imman, and released on Sony Music India label.

Track list
No.	Title	Lyrics	Singer(s)	Length
1.	"Thamizhan Endru Sollada"	Madhan Karky	D. Imman, Anirudh Ravichander, Lavanya Sundararaman	4:25
2.	"Kadai Kannaaley"	Thamarai	Shreya Ghoshal, Varun Parandhaman	4:35
3.	"Uzhavaa"	Madhan Karky	Yogi B, Sid Sriram	4:23
4.	"Vande Mataram"	Madhan Karky	Sabesh Manmathan, Ananya Bhat	3:58
5.	"Achamillai Achamillai"	Madhan Karky	Jithin Raj, Shenbagaraj, Narayanan, Deepak, Soundarya Nandakumar, Abinaya Shenbagaraj, Sowmya Mahadevan, Veena Murali	3:30
Total length:				24:28

== Release and reception ==
The film was supposed to have its theatrical release on 1 May 2020 but was indefinitely postponed due to the COVID-19 pandemic in India. It was later revealed that the theatrical release was called off due to the pandemic and was set to have a direct-to-streaming release. The filmmakers later confirmed that the film would be released via the streaming service Disney+ Hotstar as a Pongal release on 14 January 2021.

=== Critical reception ===
On the review aggregator website Rotten Tomatoes, 0% of 5 critics' reviews are positive, with an average rating of 2.5/10.

Baradwaj Rangan wrote for Film Companion, "There's a great idea, with echoes of the Swadeshi movement, that says farmers should be self-dependent. But if intentions were enough, every movie would be a masterpiece." M. Suganth of The Times of India rated the film 2.5 stars out of 5.
