= Gagan Vihari =

Indian actor in Telugu cinema

- Other names: Gagaan Viharri, Gagan Babu
- Occupation: Actor
- Years active: 2010–present
- Known for: 1996 Dharmapuri

Gagan Vihari, also credited as Gagaan Viharri and Gagan Babu, is an Indian actor who works predominantly in Telugu cinema. His film appearances include Ranga The Donga, Ninnu Kori, 118, Chanakya, Gaali Sampath, Sashi and Odela Railway Station. He played the leading role in the 2022 Telugu film 1996 Dharmapuri, directed by Jagath.

Having appeared in supporting and antagonist roles, Vihari subsequently took on leading characters. His performance in 1996 Dharmapuri received coverage in contemporary film reviews. In 2026, he was announced as one of the principal actors in Caste, a social thriller directed by A. K. Jampanna.

== Early life and education ==
Vihari hails from Pamarru in Andhra Pradesh. According to a TeluguBulletin interview published in April 2022, he completed his education in information technology and subsequently studied business administration before pursuing acting.

In interviews accompanying the release of 1996 Dharmapuri, Vihari said that acting had interested him since childhood. He described beginning his film career after completing his education and gradually moving from supporting parts to more prominent roles.

== Career ==
=== Early career (2010–2016) ===
Vihari began his acting career in Telugu cinema with Ranga The Donga (2010). In an interview published by ABN Chitrajyothy in April 2022, he identified the film as his debut and said he had been cast in an antagonist role by director G. V. Sudhakar Naidu.

During the initial years of his career, Vihari appeared in supporting parts, including characters connected to the protagonists of commercial Telugu films. His early appearances included Prasthanam and Attarintiki Daredi. In the ABN interview, Vihari recalled receiving attention for his appearance in Prasthanam and credited the opportunity to work in Attarintiki Daredi with helping him obtain further acting assignments.

He also appeared in Ekkadiki Pothavu Chinnavada (2016), which was later mentioned among his film credits in OTTplay's account of his acting career.

=== Supporting roles (2017–2021) ===
Vihari continued working in Telugu films, appearing in productions such as Ninnu Kori (2017), Krishnarjuna Yudham (2018), 118 (2019) and Chanakya (2019).

In 118, the mystery thriller starring Nandamuri Kalyan Ram and directed by K. V. Guhan, Vihari played Rony. He also appeared as Ashwin in Chanakya, an action thriller starring Gopichand. Both character credits are listed in film databases.

His subsequent film appearances included Power Play, Sashi and Gaali Sampath, all released in 2021. In Gaali Sampath, he was credited with the character name Gagan.

A June 2026 TV9 Telugu profile also identified him with films including Kshanam, Soggade Chinni Nayana, Aravinda Sametha Veera Raghava, Pushpa: The Rise and Pushpa 2: The Rule. The report described his career as comprising a mixture of supporting and negative roles.

=== Leading role in 1996 Dharmapuri (2022) ===
In 2022, Vihari appeared in the lead role of 1996 Dharmapuri, a Telugu-language rural drama written and directed by Jagath. The film, which featured Aparna Devi as the female lead, was produced by Dasari Bhaskar Yadav and presented by choreographer Sekhar Master. It was released theatrically on 22 April 2022.

Set in a rural community in Telangana, the film follows Suri, a young man whose relationship with Malli becomes entangled in the social and political circumstances of the village. Vihari portrayed Suri, while Aparna Devi played Malli.

Before the film's release, Vihari spoke about his preparations for the character. In an interview with TeluguBulletin, he explained that the part required an ordinary village youth rather than a character defined by exaggerated mannerisms. He said that the role also gave him a greater understanding of the demands placed on leading actors during film production.

The film attracted attention from Telugu entertainment publications upon its release. Reviewing 1996 Dharmapuri, OTTplay's Srivathsan Nadadhur discussed the relationship between its romantic storyline and the political conflicts of the village. The review praised aspects of Vihari's performance, particularly his emotional expression, body language and dialogue delivery.

The Times of India also reviewed the film and discussed the performances of Vihari and Aparna Devi.

In an interview published on 27 April 2022, Vihari described the response to the film and discussed his transition from supporting roles to playing a lead character. He also spoke about the encouragement he had received from director Jagath and the film's production team.

1996 Dharmapuri later became available on the Telugu streaming platform Aha. OTTplay reported its streaming release in December 2022.

=== Other projects (2022–2025) ===
In addition to 1996 Dharmapuri, Vihari appeared in Odela Railway Station (2022), directed by Ashok Teja, playing the brother of the character Tirupati. His other 2022 film credits include Leharaayi and Ninne Pelladutha.

On 1 March 2023, OTTplay reported the announcement of Gaangeaya, a Telugu family entertainer with Vihari in a leading role. The project was announced with B. Raamachandra Srinivasa Kumaar as director and T. Hema Kumar Reddy as producer under the banner Vijaya Gowthamy Art Movies. Avyuktha was announced as the female lead.

The project was described by its makers as a family-oriented drama incorporating themes of social harmony and patriotism. Its formal launch was held in Hyderabad in March 2023.

Film databases also list Vihari in Atharva (2023), Odela 2 (2025), Mazaka (2025) and 12A Railway Colony (2025).

=== Caste and later career (2026) ===
In April 2026, Vihari was named among the principal actors of Caste, a Telugu-language social thriller written and directed by A. K. Jampanna. The announced cast included Varun Sandesh, Satyam Rajesh, Ravi, Nagababu and Kashika Kapoor. The film was produced by Thota Lakshmi Koteswara Rao under Golden Productions.

According to Cinema Express, the film addresses caste-based divisions through a story combining fictional elements with incidents inspired by real life. The director introduced four of the main characters through the symbolism of the natural elements.

In October 2026, ABN Chitrajyothy reported the release of the film's teaser, identifying Vihari, credited as Gagan Babu, in the role of a police officer. The report described Caste as a social thriller involving caste discrimination and a series of murders in a village.

== Acting roles and reception ==
Vihari's career has included antagonist characters, supporting roles and leading parts. In an April 2022 interview, he discussed his earlier appearances as villains, brothers and friends of central characters before being cast as the protagonist of 1996 Dharmapuri.

The release of 1996 Dharmapuri brought a more substantial assessment of his work in film criticism. OTTplay's review noted his expressive acting and dialogue delivery, while also identifying the performances of Aparna Devi and Janardhan as important elements of the film.

In June 2026, TV9 Telugu published a feature on his career and recollections of actors N. T. Rama Rao Jr. and Nandamuri Taraka Ratna. The publication discussed his appearances in Pushpa and Pushpa 2, as well as his earlier supporting roles.

== Filmography ==
Year	Film	Role	Notes
2010	Ranga The Donga	Antagonist	Reported debut
2010	Prasthanam	Friend of the protagonist	Role described in interview
2013	Attarintiki Daredi	—	Supporting appearance
2016	Ekkadiki Pothavu Chinnavada	—	
2017	Ninnu Kori	—	
2018	Krishnarjuna Yudham	—	
2019	118	Rony	
2019	Chanakya	Ashwin	
2021	Power Play	—	
2021	Sashi	—	
2021	Gaali Sampath	Gagan	
2021	Pushpa: The Rise	—	Reported by TV9 Telugu
2022	1996 Dharmapuri	Suri	Lead role
2022	Odela Railway Station	Tirupati's brother	
2022	Leharaayi	Antagonist	
2022	Ninne Pelladutha	Inspector	
2023	Atharva	—	
2024	Pushpa 2: The Rule	—	Reported by TV9 Telugu
2025	Mazaka	—	
2025	Odela 2	—	
2025	12A Railway Colony	Tillu's assistant	
2026	Caste	Police officer	Announced film
