= 12A Railway Colony =

2025 Indian Telugu film by Nani Kasaragadda

- Theatrical release poster
- Directed by: Nani Kasaragadda
- Written by: Anil Vishwanath
- Produced by: Srinivasaa Chitturi
- Starring: Allari Naresh; Kamakshi Bhaskarla
- Cinematography: Kushendar Ramesh Reddy
- Edited by: Nani Kasaragadda
- Music by: Bheems Ceciroleo
- Production company: Srinivasaa Silver Screen
- Release date: 21 November 2025
- Running time: 125 minutes
- Country: India
- Language: Telugu

12A Railway Colony is a 2025 Indian Telugu-language horror crime thriller film edited and directed by Nani Kasaragadda. The film stars Allari Naresh and Kamakshi Bhaskarla in lead roles.

The film was released on 21 November 2025.

== Plot ==
Karthik works for Warangal politician named Tillu, but his life takes an unexpected turn after meeting Aaradhana, an aspiring sportswoman, and deciding to get closer with her. One day, Tillu gives Karthik a parcel with an instruction to keep it safe. Thinking Aaradhana's locked house is the safest place while she's away, he hides it there. Upon returning, he finds that Aaradhana and her mother have been murdered. Shocked and willing to find answers, Karthik joins forces with Rana Pratap, a police officer, to find out who is behind the killings.

== Cast ==
- Allari Naresh as Karthik
- Kamakshi Bhaskarla as Aaradhana
- P. Sai Kumar as Rana Pratap
- Anish Kuruvilla as Dr. Jayadev Shinde
- Harsha Chemudu as Jalal, Karthik's friend
- Getup Srinu as Karthik's friend
- Jeevan Kumar Naidu as Tillu
- Gagan Vihari as Tillu's assistant
- Saddam as Karthik's friend
- Madhumani as Maggie, Aaradhana's mother
- Abhirami as Shalini, Jayadev Shinde's wife

== Music ==
The background score and songs were composed by Bheems Ceciroleo.

Track listing
No.	Title	Lyrics	Singer(s)	Length
1.	"Gingira Gira"	Tarun Saidul	Bheems Ceciroleo	4:19
2.	"Gunde Gudilo"	Dev Pawar	Kapil Kapilan	4:57
3.	"Kannodili Kalanodili"	Dev Pawar	Hesham Abdul Wahab	5:06

== Release and reception ==
12A Railway Colony was released on 21 November 2025.

T Maruthi Acharya of India Today rated it 2 out of 5 and felt that the core idea is good but "the mystery lacks depth, the screenplay feels scattered and the logic behind key events is weak". Echoing the same, Srivathsan Nadadhur of The Hindu further said that Allari Naresh's character lacks consistency".
