= Meelo Evaru Koteeswarudu (film) =

2016 Telugu film by E. Satti Babu

Meelo Evaru Koteswarudu
- Theatrical release poster
- Directed by: E. Satti Babu
- Written by: E. Satti Babu
- Produced by: K. K. Radhamohan
- Starring: Naveen Chandra; Shruti Sodhi; Prudhviraj; Saloni Aswani
- Edited by: Goutham Raju
- Music by: Sri Vasanth
- Production company: Sri Sathya Sai Arts
- Release date: 16 December 2016
- Country: India
- Language: Telugu

Meelo Evaru Koteswarudu (transl. Who is the millionaire among you all?) is a 2016 Indian Telugu film directed by E. Satti Babu and produced by K. K. Radhamohan starring Naveen Chandra, Shruti Sodhi, Murali Sharma, Prudhviraj and Saloni Aswani among others. The film was released on 16 December 2016.

== Cast ==
- Naveen Chandra as Prashanth
- Shruti Sodhi as Priya
- Prudhviraj as Variation Star Veera Babu/Prince Mahesh Babu
- Saloni Aswani as Samantha
- Jaya Prakash Reddy as an actor, who acted as the father of Veera Babu
- Posani Krishna Murali as Tatha Rao
- Murali Sharma as A.B.R, Priya's father
- Raghu Babu as Roldgold Ramesh, Film Director
- Prabhas Sreenu as Production Manager
- Chalapathi Rao
- Dhanraj as Dhanraj, Prashant's friend
- Sana
- Vidyullekha Raman as Priya's friend
- Giridhar
- Pilla Prasad
- Sandhya Janak
- Junior Relangi

== Soundtrack ==
Meelo Evaru Koteeswarudu

Soundtrack album by Sri Vasanth
- Released: 2016
- Recorded: 2016
- Genre: Soundtrack
- Length: 8:28
- Language: Telugu
- Label: Aditya Music
- Producer: Sri Vasanth

Sri Vasanth chronology
Speedunnodu (2016)	Meelo Evaru Koteeswarudu (2016)	Silly Fellows (2018)

The soundtrack and background score were composed by Sri Vasanth.The audio rights of the soundtrack were purchased by Aditya Music.

Track listing
No.	Title	Lyrics	Singer(s)	Length
1.	"Antha Yedho Kalala Undhi"	Bhaskarabhatla Ravi Kumar	Ramya Behara	4:23
2.	"Nuvvu Nenu Interu"	Bhaskarabhatla Ravi Kumar	Sai Charan, Geetha Madhuri	4:05
Total length:				08:28
