= Bhimaa =

2024 Indian film by A. Harsha

- Theatrical release poster
- Directed by: A. Harsha
- Screenplay by: A. Harsha
- Dialogues by: Ajju Mahakali
- Story by: A. Harsha
- Produced by: K. K. Radhamohan
- Starring: Gopichand; Priya Bhavani Shankar; Malvika Sharma
- Cinematography: Swamy J. Gowda
- Edited by: Tammiraju
- Music by: Ravi Basrur
- Production company: Sri Sathya Sai Arts
- Release date: 8 March 2024
- Running time: 141 minutes
- Country: India
- Language: Telugu

Bhimaa is a 2024 Indian Telugu-language fantasy action thriller film written and directed by A. Harsha and produced by K. K. Radhamohan. It stars Gopichand in a dual role as identical twin brothers along with Priya Bhavani Shankar, Malvika Sharma, Nassar, Naresh, Poorna, Vennela Kishore, Raghu Babu, Mukesh Tiwari, Chammak Chandra, Niharika Konidela and Rohini. The music was composed by Ravi Basrur with cinematography by Swamy J. Gowda and editing by Tammiraju.

Bhimaa was released on 8 March 2024, coinciding with Maha Shivaratri. The film bombed at the box office.

== Plot ==
SI Bhimaa has been transferred to a place called Mahendragiri in Karnataka, where the gangsters control the place. Bhimaa meets Vidya, a school teacher and a follower of Ayurvedic practitioner Ravindra Varma. One night, Bhimaa discovers a tanker engaged in the illicit transportation of young children, where he learns that Ravindra Varma has been conducting illegal experiments to invent Sanjeevini, a herbal plant which could revive a dead person. Bhimaa arrives at Ravindra Varma's hideout and tries to stop him, but Ravindra Varma holds Vidya and the children hostage. Ravindra Varma uses the opportunity and kills Bhimaa, Vidya and the children. Bhimaa's twin brother Ramaa, a temple priest, learns about Bhimaa's death and realized his mistake of not understanding Bhimaa. Bhimaa's spirit enters Ramaa, where he finds Ravindra Varma and kills him, thus avenging Vidya and the children's deaths. Two years later, Ramaa names his newborn child after Bhimaa.

== Cast ==
- Gopichand in a dual role as
  - Bhimachandra "Bhimaa"
  - Ramachandra "Ramaa"
- Priya Bhavani Shankar as Paari
- Malvika Sharma as Vidya
- Nassar as Ravindra Varma
- Naresh as Sarangi, Bhimaa and Ramaa's uncle
- Poorna as Nandini
- Vennela Kishore as Sathish
- Mukesh Tiwari as Bhavani
- Subhalekha Sudhakar as Bhimaa's grandfather
- Raghu Babu as Constable Rao
- Chammak Chandra as Constable Chandra
- Sapthagiri as Bhattacharya, Raama's friend in temple
- Racha Ravi as Drunkard Romeo
- Sarayu as Chintamani
- Kamal Kamaraju as Srikanth IPS

== Production ==
=== Development ===
Bhimaa was officially announced on 12 June 2023, on the occasion of Gopichand's birthday. On 10 August 2023, Priya Bhavani Shankar and Malvika Sharma were announced as the leading actresses.

== Music ==
Bhimaa

Soundtrack album by Ravi Basrur
- Released: 2024
- Genre: Feature film soundtrack
- Length: 11:59
- Language: Telugu
- Label: Saregama
- Producer: Ravi Basrur

Ravi Basrur chronology
Salaar: Part 1 - Ceasefire (2023)	Bhimaa (2024)	Bhairathi Ranagal (2024)

Singles from Bhimaa
- 1. "Yedo Yedo Maaya" Released: 9 February 2024; 2. "Gaali Soundullo" Released: 21 February 2024; 3. "Rage of Bhimaa" Released: 7 March 2024

The music and the background score of the film is composed by Ravi Basrur. The first single "Yedo Yedo Maaya" was released on 9 February, and the second single, "Gaali Soundullo" was released on 21 February. This was followed by the "Rage of Bhimaa", the film's third single on 7 March.

Track list
No.	Title	Lyrics	Artist(s)	Length
1.	"Hara Hara Shambo"	Kalyan Chakravarthy	Kalyan Chakravarthy, Ravi Basrur, Vijay Prakash	2:54
2.	"The Rage of Bhimaa"		Ravi Basrur, Santhosh Venky	2:02
3.	"Galli Soundullo"		Ravi Basrur, Santhosh Venky	3:41
4.	"Yedo Yedo Maaya"	Kalyan Chakravarthy	Kalyan Chakravarthy, Ravi Basrur, Anurag Kulkarni	3:22

== Reception ==
Chitradeepa Anantharam of The Hindu wrote, "This mass action film has incorporated a cocktail of themes such as supernatural, spiritual, sibling love and more, but loses focus along the way. Despite flaws, if the film keeps the audience engaged, it is because of the stellar performance of Gopichand." Paul Nicodemus of The Times of India gave 2.5/5 stars and wrote, "Bhimaa presents a visually and thematically engaging action drama, underpinned by a fascinating premise. Yet, its reliance on outdated storytelling techniques undermines its potential, rendering it a mixed offering for audiences seeking depth and innovation in cinematic narratives." BVS Prakash of Deccan Chronicle gave 1.5/5 stars and wrote, "Harsha tries to blend supernatural elements into a routine cop story to dish out a larger-than-life movie, but it makes a mockery of Lord Shiva."

== Release ==
=== Theatrical ===
Bhimaa was released on 8 March 2024, coinciding with Maha Shivaratri.

=== Home media ===
The film premiered on Disney+ Hotstar from 25 April 2024.
