= Simbaa =

2024 Indian film by Murali Manohar

- Theatrical release poster
- Directed by: Murali Manohar
- Written by: Sampath Nandi
- Produced by: Sampath Nandi; Dasari Rajender Reddy
- Starring: Jagapathi Babu; Anasuya Bharadwaj
- Cinematography: Krishna Prasad
- Edited by: Tammiraju
- Music by: Krishna Saurabh Surampalli
- Production companies: Sampath Nandi Team Works; Raj Dasari Productions
- Release date: 9 August 2024
- Country: India
- Language: Telugu

Simbaa is a 2024 Indian Telugu-language crime thriller film directed by Murali Manohar and written by Sampath Nandi. Produced by Sampath Nandi Team Works and Raj Dasari Productions, the film features Jagapathi Babu and Anasuya Bharadwaj in lead roles, while Srinath Maganti, Vasishta N. Simha, and Anish Kuruvilla play supporting roles Simbaa was released on 9 August 2024.

== Plot ==
Environmental activist T. Purushottam Reddy, known as Simbaa, fights against industrial pollution. After saving three lives, their collective journey of gratitude transforms into a determined quest for justice against those who harm Mother Nature.

Akshika, a dedicated teacher and caretaker for her disabled husband, is thrown into chaos when she suddenly murders a stranger. As ACP Anurag and journalist Fazil investigate, Fazil also develops a disturbing urge to kill and joins Akshika. Dr. Irani soon follows, leading the three to commit murder together.

== Cast ==
- Jagapathi Babu as T. Purushottam Reddy aka Simmba
- Anasuya Bharadwaj as Akshika Anumula
- Srinath Maganti as Mohammed Fazil Ahmed
- Vasishta N. Simha as ACP Anurag Varma
- Anish Kuruvilla as Dr. Irani
- Gautami
- Kabir Duhan Singh as Parthasarathi Reddy
- Divi Vadthya
- Kasthuri Shankar
- Mayank Parakh
- Siddharth Gollapudi as Sabharwal

== Music ==
Simbaa

Soundtrack album by Krishna Saurabh Surampalli
- Released: 2024
- Recorded: 2022–2024
- Language: Telugu
- Label: Sony Music India
- Producer: Krishna Saurabh Surampalli

The film's soundtrack album and background score were composed by Krishna Saurabh Surampalli.

All music is composed by Krishna Saurabh Surampalli.

Track list
No.	Title	Lyrics	Singer(s)	Length
1.	"Prema Geema"	Mittapalli Surender	Nithyashree Venkataramanan	3:06
2.	"Simbaa Theme"	Shree Annamayya	Yadu Krishnan K	3:44

== Release and reception ==
Simbaa was released on 9 August 2024.

Appreciating the storyline and performances of the main cast, BH Harsh of Cinema Express stated, "high concept thriller goes haywire". The Hans India appreciated the ambition of the film, while opining that execution falls short. Further, the critic praised performances of the cast and the cinematography work done by Krishna Prasad.
