= Adhineta =

- Movie Poster
- Directed by: V. Samudra
- Written by: Paruchuri Brothers (story / dialogues)
- Screenplay by: V. Samudra
- Produced by: K. K. Radha Mohan
- Starring: Jagapati Babu; Shraddha Das; Hamsa Nandini
- Cinematography: D. Prasad Babu
- Edited by: Nandamuri Hari
- Music by: Srikanth Deva
- Production company: Sri Satya Sai Arts
- Release date: 24 April 2009
- Running time: 156 minutes
- Country: India
- Language: Telugu

Adhineta (transl. Leader) is a 2009 Indian Telugu-language political action film directed by V. Samudra and produced by K. K. Radha Mohan on Sri Satya Sai Arts banner. The film stars Jagapati Babu, Shraddha Das, and Hamsa Nandini with music composed by Srikanth Deva. The film was released to negative reviews.

== Plot ==
The film begins in a village where Suryanarayana / Suri Babu is an unemployed youth who stands for righteousness. Puttaguntla Sriramulaiah, a rectitude MLA, is the preceptor of Suri Babu. He always insists Suri Babu be on board with politics, which he denies. Then, with Sriramulaiah's influence, Suri Babu joins as Personal Secretary to an amoral Chief Minister Tirupati Nayudu. In his tyranny, anarchy and irregularities flare in the direction of an anti-social element, Mahendra Bhupati, the sidekick to CM. Suri Babu, in his rank, helps the impoverished and acquires a good reputation in public. In that process, he provides financial support for a penniless student, Rajeswari, and they fall in love.

Once, Mahendra Bhupati's younger brother, Narendra Bhupati, bedevils with a girl, Aasha, sister of CM's attender, when Suri Babu kicks him off. In that rage, Narendra and his friends molest and slaughter Aasha. Suri Babu catches them with pieces of evidence and files up the case. But CM pulled wires and dropped the charges against the culprits. During that plight, Sriramulaiah started a public agitation against the CM, which intensified. So, CM slays Sriramulaiah, and before leaving his breath, he takes an oath from Suri Babu that he will enter politics as his heir—accordingly, Suri Babu contests from the Sriramulu constituency, opposite CM's candidate Mahendra Bhupathi. Soon after triumphing, Suri Babu accumulated 25 independents, which became the deciding factor in forming a government. Here, Bharatamma, wife of Sriramulaiah, offers support to the party that makes Suri Babu CM as it is a prerequisite, Tirupati Naidu's party steps in and designates Suri Babu as Chief Minister of Andhra Pradesh. From there, he made many revolutionary changes in governance that mobilized a high level of public credence and applause.

Parallelly, Tirupati Naidu and Mahendra Bhupati avenge their political failure. On the eve of Suri Babu and Rajeswari, they plot to assassinate him, but his parents die in it. Enraged, Suri Babu outbursts Tirupati Naidu and challenges that the law will not spare him. Suri Babu forms a special team to uncover the diabolic shade of these brutal. Plus, he entrusts the charge to Inspector Hamsa Nandini, who he favors to gain employment. On the verge of cracking the case, the miscreants slaughter Hamsa Nandini and smash the leads. Moreover, the knaves incriminate and apprehend Suri Babu as the homicide of Puttaguntla Sriramulaiah, which dethrones him, and the government collapses. Suri Babu has decided to establish a new party with new young candidates. He starts his campaign for ensuing elections from the prison, which procures great response and glory. At last, Suri Babu calls for a vast meeting, Maha Garjana Sabha, when the devil ruins to bar him. Yet, he successfully reaches the destination ceasing. Finally, the movie ends with Suri Babu announcing his party as Mana Desam and introducing a new system of Recall.

== Cast ==
- Jagapati Babu as Veeramachineni Surya Narayana / Suribabu / Suri
- Shraddha Das as Rajeswari
- Hamsa Nandini as Hamsa Nandini
- Chalapathi Rao as Suri's father
- Annapoorna as Suri's mother
- Ahuti Prasad as CM Tirupati Nayudu
- Anandaraj as Mahendra Bhupati
- Supreeth as Mahendra's henchman
- Paruchuri Gopala Krishna as Puttaguntla Sriramulaiah
- Krishna Bhagavaan as Suri's friend
- Uttej as Peon
- Murali Mohan
- Raghu Babu
- Pruthvi Raj
- L. B. Sriram
- Chitram Srinu as Suri's friend
- Raghunatha Reddy as Politician
- Neelima as Kavya
- Siva Parvati as Bharathamma
- Vallabhaneni Janardhan
- Uppalapati Narayana Rao
- Jackie
- Jogi Brothers
- Prasanna
- Rajababu
- Kota Shankara Rao
- Hema Sundar
- Devisri
- Padma Jayanthi
- Priyadarshini
- Kavya

== Production ==
The film began filming in January 2009. It was shot in Bhadrachalam for twenty days and in Hyderabad. This is Jagapathi Babu's first political film.

== Soundtrack ==
Adhineta

Soundtrack album by Srikanth Deva
- Released: 2009
- Genre: Soundtrack
- Length: 25:26
- Label: Aditya Music
- Producer: Srikanth Deva

Srikanth Deva chronology
Guru En Aalu (2009)	Adhineta (2009)	Aarumaname (2009)

Music composed by Srikanth Deva. The music was released on Aditya Music. The audio release function was held at Prasad Labs in Hyderabad on 11 April 2009. The song "Janagatha Netha" is inspired by "Arjunaru Villu" from Ghilli (2004). The song "Arjuna Arjuna" is based on Srikanth Deva's own song of same name which he composed for Tamil film Aai (2004).

No.	Title	Lyrics	Singer(s)	Length
1.	"Monalisa Monalisa"	Thaidala Bapu	Karthik, Sunitha Sarathy	4:36
2.	"Premante Ado Idi"	Abhinava Srinivas	Kälpana	4:19
3.	"Amruthanni Atuvaipunchi"	Guru Charan	S. P. Balasubrahmanyam	4:44
4.	"Arjuna Arjuna"	Guru Charan	Saketh, Suchitra	5:10
5.	"Janagana Netha"	Abhinava Srinivas	Mano	4:28
6.	"Adhineta (Theme)"	Music Bit	Instrumental	2:04
Total length:				25:26

== Release and reception ==
The film was planned to be released prior to the 2009 elections on 10 April 2009.

A critic from Idlebrain.com rated the film two out of five and wrote that "On a whole, Adhineta disappoints". A critic from Bangalore Mirror wrote, "The film runs at a very slow pace and tests your patience".
