= Luksimi Sivaneswaralingam =

- Born: Luksimi Sivaneswaralingam; Toronto, Canada
- Genres: Western, Carnatic
- Instruments: Vocals; Piano; Veena
- Years active: 2017–present

Luksimi Sivaneswaralingam (born 26 September 1993) is a Canadian playback singer and classical dancer from Toronto, Ontario, Canada. Luksimi Sivaneswaralingam was three years old when she began her lessons in music.

== Career ==
She began as a carnatic music student and soon included lessons in Western classical and popular vocals, bharathanatyam, veena and piano. She performed in competitions, in both Carnatic and film genres.

Luksimi Sivaneswaralingam is a University of Toronto alumni, as she graduated from the University of Toronto Faculty of Music with a Bachelor of Music – Voice Performance Specialist (western classical), in addition to a Bachelor of Music – Carnatic Vocal from Annamalai University's Canada Campus. Continuing her education, in 2017 she completed her post graduate degree at Wilfrid Laurier University for curriculum based music programs. She is now an OCT certified teacher.

== Discography ==
Year	Film	Song	Language	Music director
2017	Bogan	"Senthoora"	Tamil	D. Imman
2018	Tik Tik Tik (D)	"Kannayya" (Reprise: Mother's Love)	Telugu	D. Imman
2019	Gangs of Madras	"Agayam Suduthey"	Tamil	Hari Dafusia
2020	Independent Single	Far Away	Tamil	Luksimi Sivaneswaralingam ft. Rianjali
2021	Independent Single	Dhrogham (Female Version)	Tamil	Psychomantra
2022	Cobra (D)	"Hey Dheera"	Malayalam	A. R. Rahman

Album

- Ippadai Vellum

== Awards and nominations ==
She has been conferred with the title of Natya Kala Jyothi for her classical dance.

Year	Award	Category	Song	Results
2017	Norway Tamil Film Festival Awards	Midnight Sun Singer 2017	"Senthoora"	Won
2017	Vijay Awards	Best Playback Singer-Female	"Senthoora"	Won
2017	Vijay Awards	Best Song of 2017	"Senthoora"	Nominated
2017	Mirchi Music Awards South	Upcoming Female Vocalist	"Senthoora"	Won
2017	Filmfare Awards South	Best Playback Singer-Female	"Senthoora"	Nominated
2017	Hello FM	Best Playback Singer-Female	"Senthoora"	Won
2017	South Indian International Movie Awards	Best Playback Singer-Female	"Senthoora"	Won
