= Soundararajan =

Soundararajan is a surname. Notable people with the surname include:

- T. M. Soundararajan (1923–2013), Indian singer
- Kannan Soundararajan (born 1973), Indian-American mathematician
- Soundararajan (born 1976), Indian cinematographer
- Tamilisai Soundararajan (born 1961), Indian politician
