= K. K. Radhamohan =

Indian film producer

- Born: India
- Occupation: Producer
- Years active: 2009–present

K. K. Radhamohan is an Indian film producer in Telugu cinema. In 2009, he ventured into film production under his production company, Sri Sathya Sai Arts.

== Filmography ==
Sri Sathya Sai Arts
- Company type: Private
- Industry: Entertainment
- Founded: Hyderabad, India
- Founder: K. K. Radhamohan
- Headquarters: Hyderabad, India
- Products: Films
- Services: Film production

=== As producer ===
Key
†	Denotes films that have not yet been released

Year	Film	Language	Ref.
2009	Adhineta	Telugu	
2010	Yemaindi Ee Vela	Telugu	
2014	Pyar Mein Padipoyane	Telugu	
2015	Bengal Tiger	Telugu	
2016	Meelo Evaru Koteeswarudu	Telugu	
2018	Pantham	Telugu	
2020	Orey Bujjiga	Telugu	
2022	Odela Railway Station	Telugu	
2022	Crazy Fellow	Telugu	
2024	Naguvina Hoogala Mele	Kannada	
2024	Bhimaa	Telugu	
2024	Ruslaan	Hindi	
2025	Bhairavam	Telugu	
