= Goutham Nanda =

2017 Indian Telugu-language action drama film

- Theatrical Release Poster
- Directed by: Sampath Nandi
- Written by: Sampath Nandi
- Produced by: J. Bhagavan; J. Pulla Rao
- Starring: Gopichand; Hansika Motwani; Catherine Tresa
- Cinematography: Sounder Rajan
- Edited by: Gautham Raju
- Music by: S. Thaman
- Production company: Sri Balaji Cine Media
- Release date: 28 July 2017
- Running time: 156 minutes
- Country: India
- Language: Telugu
- Budget: ₹26 crore
- Box office: ₹30 crore

Goutham Nanda is a 2017 Indian Telugu-language action drama film written and directed by Sampath Nandi. The film is an adaptation of the ANR starrer 1961 film Iddaru Mitrulu, which itself is a remake of Uttam Kumar's Bengali film Tasher Ghar (1957), also influenced by Daphne Du Maurier’s famous novel The Scapegoat. It stars Gopichand in a dual role as hero and villain along with Hansika Motwani and Catherine Tresa while Mukesh Rishi, Sachin Khedekar, and Nikitin Dheer appear in supporting roles.

The film has music composed by S. Thaman. The plot follows two lookalikes, Goutham and Nanda, who meet while trying to end their lives. Goutham is a billionaire's spoiled son who wants to feel emotions and Nanda is a poverty-stricken software engineer who wants to become a billionaire. They decide to swap their identities for a month and eventually face challenges from each other as they both start savoring the lives they wanted to live.

The film was released theatrically on 28 July 2017 where it received positive reviews with praise for the production values, action sequences, performances, soundtrack and dialogues. Despite failing commercially, over the years it has found more acceptance and became more popular, especially receiving accolades from audience regarding films theme and message of the movie and thrill elements. Now it is considered a cult classic.

== Plot ==
Goutham Ghattamaneni and Nanda Kishore, two doppelgangers from different social classes, decide to swap lives, which would expose them to experience the lifestyle that they have been craving for, after which Goutham would be introduced to the world as the sole heir of his father's wealth. They spend a night in a hotel learning about each other and fitting into each other’s shoes to begin their new lives.

Goutham starts rough, but with some words from Nanda's father for not taking up a job and returning home but living with Nanda's family, he experiences all the emotions that he has been longing for and helps them by being a better son than Nanda could ever be. On the other hand, Nanda has the perfect beginning, except for a few questions from his staff. Goutham starts to fall for Spoorthi and Nanda for Mugdha. Meanwhile, Mudra and Goutham's CSO Gowda plan to kill Goutham. After a failed attempt to kill Nanda (who they think is Goutham), they realize that Goutham had switched places with Nanda and plan to finish him off in Hyderabad. They make several attempts at killing Goutham, though they fail. Goutham realizes that even Nanda is trying to kill him when he found out an imprint of one of his exercise shoes on the mud, even though his family (Nanda’s) is collateral damage. When confronted about the same, Nanda confesses that he did all this for money and so he had joined hands with Mudra and Gowda when he found out that the duo was trying to kill him.

Soon, Nanda frames Goutham by publicly murdering their slum corporator's son Bujji, but Goutham escapes the cops and confronts Nanda in the presence of his family (Goutham’s), who were manipulated by Nanda (whom they think is Goutham). They fail to recognize that Nanda is in Goutham’s place, and they hand Goutham over to the cops. Goutham escapes the cops with the help of Mugdha, who knows that he is Goutham. They arrive at the spot where Spoorthi has been held hostage by Nanda, who also kills Mudra. A fight breaks out between Goutham, Nanda, and Gowda which leads to the death of Gowda followed by another fight on the helipad in which Nanda ends up dead by falling off. Later, Goutham is introduced as the legal heir to his father’s wealth but he announces his venturing towards the path of humanity and donates the entire wealth to a charity, and when asked for an autograph he signs Goutham Nanda. Mugdha is made the CEO of the company, and Goutham shares his life with Nanda's parents and Spoorthi. The film ends with Gautama Buddha's saying Greed for money is the root of all evil.

== Cast ==
- Gopichand in a dual role as
  - Goutham Ghattamaneni, main protagonist
  - Nanda Kishore, main antagonist
- Hansika as Spoorthi
- Catherine Tresa as Mugdha
- Mukesh Rishi as Mudra, Mugdha's father
- Sachin Khedekar as Ghattamaneni Vishnu Prasad, Goutham's father
- Nikitin Dheer as Gowda
- Paruchuri Venkateswara Rao as Venkatachalam, Spoorthi's father
- Chandra Mohan as Chandram, Nanda's father
- Seetha as Satya, Nanda's mother
- Ajay as Borabanda Bujji Yadav
- Vennela Kishore as Kishore
- Sudha as Rajyalakshmi, Spoorthi's mother
- Geetha as Janaki, Mugdha's mother
- Anupama Kumar as Bharathi, Goutham's mother
- Tanikella Bharani as Waiter
- Annapurna as Lakshmamma
- Vidyullekha Raman as Pandu, Spoorthi's friend
- Shreeradhe Khanduja as Nanda's sister
- Jaya Prakash Reddy as JP Gowda
- Duvvasi Mohan as Duvvasi, Pani Puri seller
- Karate Kalyani
- Thotapalli Madhu as Kishore's father
- Venu Yeldandi
- Sivannarayana Naripeddi
- Chanti
- Temper Vamsi as Goon
- Bithiri Sathi as Sathi

== Soundtrack ==
Music composed by S. Thaman. The soundtrack was released by Zee Music Company.

No.	Title	Lyrics	Singer(s)	Length
1.	"Zindagi Na Milegi Dobara"	Ramajogayya Sastry, Neeraja Kona	S. Thaman, Yazin Nizar	6:03
2.	"Black & White"	Ramajogayya Sastry	Divya Kumar	3:31
3.	"Basthi Dorasani"	Ramajogayya Sastry	Nakash Aziz, Ramya Behara, Sony	4:35
4.	"Bole Ram Bole Ram"	Ramajogayya Sastry	Sri Krishna, M. L. Sruthi	4:58
5.	"Goutham Nanda"	SS Thaman	Theme Music	1:55
Total length:				21:02

== Reception ==
Sowmya Sruthi of The Times Of India gave the film a rating of 3/5 and wrote "Goutham Nanda is definitely worth a watch and a treat for fans of Gopichand, who will get to see two of him". Hemanth Kumar of Firstpost gave the film a rating of 2.5/5 and wrote "There’s barely anything dramatic in the film’s first half and save for a chuckle or two, thanks to Vennela Kishore and Bithri Sathi, Goutham Nanda is quite dull for most part of its run-time". Manoj Kumar R of Indian Express gave the film a rating of 1/5 and wrote "Goutham Nanda exposes director-writer Sampath, who seems incapable of creativity and logical thinking".
