= Paper Boy =

- Theatrical release poster
- Directed by: V. Jayashankarr
- Written by: Sampath Nandi
- Produced by: Sampath Nandi; Ramulu; Venkat; Narasimha
- Starring: Santosh Sobhan; Riya Suman; Tanya Hope
- Cinematography: Soundarrajan
- Edited by: Tammiraju
- Music by: Bheems Ceciroleo
- Production companies: Sampath Nandi TeamWorks; BLN Cinema; Prachitra Creations
- Distributed by: Geetha Arts
- Release date: 31 August 2018
- Running time: 125 minutes
- Country: India
- Language: Telugu

Paper Boy is a 2018 Telugu-language romantic drama film written and produced by Sampath Nandi and directed by V. Jayashankarr. The leading actors are Santosh Sobhan, Riya Suman, and Tanya Hope. It was released on 31 August 2018.

== Plot ==
Megha (Tanya Hope) who lives in Mumbai finds out she only has few days to live due to a rare genetic disorder, and wants to know her true purpose in life. At a temple, she comes across a page from a diary. Intrigued at the words written in it, she gets the diary and starts reading it. The diary contains the love story of Ravi, a paper boy and Dharani (Riya Suman), a rich girl. Dharani's parents have a problem with her choice and troubles arise for the young couple - breaking them apart.

The story in the Diary ends on a cliff-hanger, so Megha travels to Hyderabad based on the address found in the book in search of Ravi and Dharani, to find out what really happened. Megha finds Dharani there in Ravi's house but learns the shocking truth that Ravi's dead although she didn't witness it exactly.

By chance, they come across a unique bouquet of flowers, that is basically Ravi's signature. With the new hope that Ravi is alive, Megha, her fiance and Dharani go in search of the bouquet maker's address. They finally reach Pune, a cottage with flowers fields but a nearby stranger confirms that no one with the name of Ravi live there.

Disappointed and in tears, Dharani and gang leave but she soon catches the sight of a dog (Appu) running behind their car. The dog leads them to Ravi who's working in a garden nearby and they happily reunite. Megha is glad that her purpose in life is to unite these lovers. The movie ends on a note that there is sincerity in Ravi and Dharani's love, hence they are able to find their way back to each other.

== Cast ==
- Santosh Sobhan as Ravi
- Riya Suman as Dharani
- Tanya Hope as Megha
- Posani Krishna Murali
- Annapurna
- Bithiri Sathi as himself
- VJ Sunny as Patanjali
- Abhishek Maharshi
- Mahesh Vitta as Sarpam
- Aman Saini as Karan
- Lahari Shari as Priya
- Vidyullekha Raman
- Kalpa Latha

== Music ==
The music was composed by Bheems Ceciroleo, and the audio was released through Times Music label.

Paper Boy

Soundtrack album by Bheems Ceciroleo
- Released: 2018
- Genre: Feature film soundtrack
- Length: 20:34
- Language: Telugu
- Label: Times Music
- Producer: Bheems Ceciroleo

Bheems Ceciroleo chronology
PSV Garuda Vega (2017)	Paper Boy (2018)	Software Sudheer (2019)

No.	Title	Lyrics	Singer(s)	Length
1.	"Bombai Pothava Raja"	Suresh Upadhyaya	Bheems Ceciroleo, Raghuram	4:09
2.	"Paper Boy"	Kasarla Shyam	Chandrabose	4:00
3.	"I Think I am in Love"	Suresh Upadhyaya	Shreya Ghoshal, Raghuram	3:28
4.	"Theri Meri"	Suresh Upadhyaya	Bheems Ceciroleo, Raghuram	4:10
5.	"Chinukai Kurisindi"	Suresh Upadhyaya	Shahid Mallya	4:47
Total length:				20:34

== Release ==
Paper Boy was released on 31 August 2018.

== Critical reception ==
The film received 3 stars out of five in a review by 123telugu.com.
