= Soundararajan (cinematographer) =

Indian cinematographer (born 1976)

- Born: 29 August 1976 (age 50); Uthiramerur, Kanchipuram district, Tamil Nadu, India
- Education: Loyola School, Chennai
- Occupation: Cinematographer
- Spouse(s): Anusha Soundar (2005–present)
- Relatives: Vijay Rathinam (Brother)

Soundararajan is an Indian cinematographer who has worked in the Tamil, Telugu and Malayalam film industries.

== Early life ==
Soundar Rajan was born in Uthiramerur, Tamil Nadu to Saranathan and Chandra. His childhood days were spent in Kancheepuram. He graduated with Bachelor's degree in Visual Communications from Loyola College.

== Career ==
Soundar Rajan completed a degree in Visual Communications at Loyola College, Chennai before approaching P. C. Sreeram for work experience. Sreeram recommended him to K. V. Anand, who accepted him as an assistant, and they subsequently worked on films including Nerukku Ner (1997), Mudhalvan (1999) and Josh (2000), before continuing as an apprentice till Khakee (2004). Soundar Rajan made his debut as a lead cinematographer with Sukran (2005), before going on to work on Kana Kandaen (2005), directed by his mentor K. V. Anand. He was also given an opportunity by director Shankar to shoot Chimbu Deven's Arai En 305-il Kadavul (2008).

He is an acclaimed ad film cinematographer with more than 3000 ad films to his credit. He has since worked on Telugu films including the fantasy film, Anaganaga O Dheerudu (2011), where he worked extensively on visual effects for the first time. Soundar Rajan also then continued work on Tamil films including a collaboration with Anand again in Maattrraan (2012), where Suriya portrayed conjoined twins and the crew used up to five different techniques to get the desired illusion on screen. He also won critical acclaim for his work in the bilingual Vaayai Moodi Pesavum (2014) for his depiction of a fictional hill town. In 2017, he won critical acclaim for his work in Lakshman's action film Bogan.

== Personal life ==
Soundar Rajan married Anusha L on 11 December 2005. They have two children Advaith Soundar (born 22 December 2008) and Nikita Soundar (born 29 September 2006)

== Filmography ==
=== As cinematographer ===
Key
†	Denotes films that have not yet been released

Year	Film	Language	Notes
2005	Sukran	Tamil	
2005	Kana Kandaen	Tamil	
2006	Aathi	Tamil	
2008	Arai En 305-il Kadavul	Tamil	
2009	Billa	Telugu	
2010	Bale Pandiya	Tamil	
2011	Anaganaga O Dheerudu	Telugu	
2012	Maattrraan	Tamil	
2014	Samsaaram Aarogyathinu Haanikaram; Vaayai Moodi Pesavum	Malayalam; Tamil	
2015	Isai	Tamil	
2015	Romeo Juliet	Tamil	
2015	Bengal Tiger	Telugu	
2017	Bogan	Tamil	
2017	Goutham Nanda	Telugu	
2018	Paper Boy	Telugu	
2019	Charlie Chaplin 2	Tamil	
2019	High Priestess	Tamil	Web series
2021	Seetimaarr	Telugu	
2022	Odela Railway Station	Telugu	Direct streaming release on Aha
2023	Amigos	Telugu	
2023	Devil: The British Secret Agent	Telugu	
2025	Odela 2	Telugu	
2026	Nagabandham: The Secret Treasure	Telugu	

=== As guest cinematographer ===
Year	Film	Language	Notes
2007	Billa	Tamil	Chase sequence
2007	Sivaji: The Boss	Tamil	
2008	Velli Thirai	Tamil	Song: Thaiyya Thaiyya
2011	Engeyum Kadhal	Tamil	Song: Thee Ilai
2016	Saagasam	Tamil	Song: Desi Girl
2022	Godfather	Telugu	

=== As associate cinematographer ===
Year	Film	Language	Notes
1997	Nerukku Ner	Tamil	
1998	Doli Saja Ke Rakhna	Hindi	
1999	Mudhalvan	Tamil	
2000	Josh	Hindi	
2001	Nayak: The Real Hero	Hindi	Remake of Mudhalvan
2002	Virumbugiren	Tamil	
2002	The Legend of Bhagat Singh	Hindi	
2004	Khakee	Hindi	

=== As actor ===
- Bogan (2017)

=== Behind the Scenes ===
- Goutham Nanda
- Romeo Juliet
- Isai
- Bengal Tiger- Raaye Raaye song
- Charlie Chaplin 2
