= Pantham =

- Theatrical release poster
- Directed by: K. Chakravarthy Reddy
- Screenplay by: Bobby Kolli
- Story by: K. Chakravarthy Reddy
- Produced by: K. K. Radhamohan
- Starring: Gopichand; Mehreen Pirzada
- Cinematography: Prasad Murella
- Edited by: Prawin Pudi
- Music by: Gopi Sundar
- Production company: Sri Sathya Sai Arts
- Release date: 5 July 2018
- Running time: 145 minutes
- Country: India
- Language: Telugu
- Box office: est. ₹19 crore

Pantham (transl. Stubbornness) is a 2018 Indian Telugu-language action heist film directed by K. Chakravarthy Reddy, starring Gopichand and Mehreen Pirzada. The film's music has been composed by Gopi Sundar and also features art direction by AS Prakash, dialogues by Ramesh Reddy and cinematography by Prasad Murella. The film revolves around a young vigilante who targets corrupt politicians and steals their money to help the needy.

Previously planned to release in the month of May, the film was released on 5 July 2018 and was a commercial failure at the box office, grossing over only ₹19 crore.

== Plot ==
The protagonist is a vigilante who taps the phone of a medical mafia king named Amith Rajvi and listens to a conversation in which a man named Nayak Bhai orders him to send money in a goods train. The protagonist's sidekick Satti stops a tractor at a railway crossing, causing the train to stop and the protagonist to enter the compartment containing the money where he fights off the guards and decouples it before the train reaches the next station. Later, a partially deaf CBI officer instantly cracks the case. The protagonist helps a rich woman in winning a horse betting race and later steals money from her safe in her absence. The home minister Jayendra is revealed to be Nayak Bhai who's frustrated at his money getting stolen and orders the killing of both Rajvi and the woman. Again, the CBI officer cracks the second case and hands over the evidence to Nayak who then attacks a lot of people out of suspicion. The health minister sends him the protagonist's photo which is forwarded to all his goons over the city, and the protagonist is brought to the goons by a cab driver who turns out to be Nayak's henchman. A fight ensues, resulting in a conversation in which Nayak recruits the protagonist to help him catch the robber, as per the health minister's suggestion who was impressed by how neatly the protagonist and Satti had stolen his cars earlier.

The protagonist and Nayak's men then are sent for a safe money transfer. With the help of three men, the protagonist tricks the goons into giving them the money but due to a tracker kept inside the currency bag, the three men are captured and beaten up. The protagonist reveals himself as the real robber and fights off all the goons. The protagonist's girlfriend Akshara and an old man named Tilak are kidnapped and brought to Nayak. Tilak then reveals the protagonist is Vikranth Surana, the son of a London-based billionaire businessman Anand Surana (10th richest in the world), the owner of Surana Group of Companies, one of the top 10 biggest corporate companies in the world. Vikranth loved his mother Durgadevi but his father despised her social service as it didn't yield enough money. They all had to go to London since Anand wanted to expand his business, where Durgadevi died. Tilak is the caretaker of Durgadevi charitable trust and invited Anand for the trust's 25th anniversary celebrations, but Vikranth came instead for the celebrations and became disillusioned by the plight of several bomb blast victims who were promised ex-gratia by the home minister Jayendra and the health minister, to whom Vikrath had also anonymously sent a cheque of 1 crore rupees. Vikranth then decided to help the people after knowing about their plight, and proceeded to resign from his post at his father's company.

Back to present, Vikranth brings reporters to Nayak's house and makes him pay 5 crore rupees as ex-gratia. Later, Vikranth creates a fake bomb alert outside a court where he surrenders after opening a truck full of money stolen from corrupt ministers. Following his arrest, his father arrives to meet him and has a change of heart when he sees so many people supporting Vikranth who decides to fight his case himself. An enraged Nayak sends prisoners to kill Vikranth at night, but he manages to fight them off and the next day in the court, presents all the evidence against Nayak and other ministers. He even brings Rajvi and the Nayak's female client as witnesses who reveal that Vikranth saved them. Vikranth also presents a footage of Nayak threatening them but the opposing lawyer presents a doctored version of the footage and levies false charges not just on Vikranth and his father but also on the Durgadevi charitable trust. The judge orders CBI inquiry on the trust, which is carried out by the same officer hired by Nayak earlier. He testifies against Nayak and also states that due to being partially deaf, he had to record Nayak's conversations which now stand as evidence against him. Further, Vikranth cites the Whistle Blowers Protection Act, 2011 as his defense and suggests the government to digitally transfer ex-gratia to victims. The court sentences all the perpetrators and orders the government to disperse ex-gratia via digital transfer method.

== Cast ==
- Gopichand as Vikranth Surana
- Mehreen Pirzada as Akshara
- Sampath Raj as Home Minister Jayendra alias Naayak
- Mukesh Rishi as Anand Surana, Vikranth's father
- Pavitra Lokesh as Durgadevi Surana, Vikranth's mother
- Jaya Prakash Reddy as Health Minister
- Ashish Vidyarthi as Defense Lawyer
- Raghu Babu as Raghu, Vikranth's friend
- Sayaji Shinde as CBI Officer
- Srinivasa Reddy as Vikranth's friend
- Kasi Viswanath as Akshara's father
- Tanikella Bharani as Trust Chairman Tilak
- Ajay as Amith Rajvi
- Hamsa Nandini as Naayak's client
- Prudhviraj as House Owner Vaadakam
- Satya Krishnan as House Owner's wife
- Paruchuri Venkateswara Rao as Lawyer
- Giri Babu as High Court Judge
- Prabhas Sreenu as Naayak's assistant
- Prabhakar as Naayak's henchman
- Sameer Hasan as Government Officer
- Harsha Vardhan as Anand's staff
- Priya as Akshara's mother
- Jhansi
- Ravi Varma as Jhansi's brother
- Kaumudi Nemaninas Akshara's friend

== Production ==
The film mark Gopichand's 25th film in his career, it also marks the directorial debut of K. Chakravarthi Reddy, who previously worked as the screenplay writer for Telugu action films like Balupu, Power and Jai Lava Kusa.

== Soundtrack ==
The music was composed by Gopi Sundar and released by Mango Music. All lyrics were penned by Bhaskarabhatla Ravi Kumar.

Pantham

Soundtrack album by Gopi Sundar
- Released: 21 June 2018
- Recorded: 2018
- Genre: Soundtrack
- Length: 20:18
- Language: Telugu
- Label: Mango Music
- Producer: Gopi Sundar

Gopi Sundar chronology
Tej I Love You (2018)	Pantham (2018)	Geetha Govindam (2018)

Track list
No.	Title	Singer(s)	Length
1.	"Deshamante"	Ranjith	4:34
2.	"Right Now"	Sithara Krishnakumar	4:11
3.	"First Time"	Yazin Nizar, Divya S. Menon	4:24
4.	"I'm Sorry"	Karthik	3:24
5.	"Ek Dham"	Haricharan, Rita Thyagarajan	3:45
Total length:			20:18

== Release ==
Pantham was released worldwide on 5 July 2018.

== Reception ==
Pantham received mixed reviews from critics.

123Telugu gave 3 out of 5 stars and wrote "Pantham is a passable social drama which showcases a decent message. Even though the story is outdated, director Chakri has made sure that there is some fun in the first half and climax is satisfactory." Neeshita Nyayapati of The Times of India gave 2.5 out of 5 stars and wrote "This one is purely for Gopichand fans and for those who like commercial pot-boilers with a message."

Venkat Arikatla of Greatandhra gave 2.5 out of 5 stars and wrote "Major complaint from audiences has been Gopichand’s movies have turned too predictable of late. Still, the star is not coming out from them." Hemanth Kumar of Firstpost wrote "Pantham feels like a mishmash of several popular films, including Srimanthudu and Kick, although it is nowhere near the emotional impact of its predecessors."
