= Pyar Mein Padipoyane =

2014 Indian Telugu romantic comedy film

- Theatrical poster
- Directed by: Ravikumar Chavali
- Written by: Ravikumar Chavali
- Produced by: K. K. Radhamohan
- Starring: Aadi; Shanvi Srivastava; Vennela Kishore
- Cinematography: T. Surendra Reddy
- Edited by: K. V. Krishna Reddy
- Music by: Anup Rubens
- Production company: Sri Sathya Sai Arts
- Release date: 10 May 2014
- Running time: 148 Minutes
- Country: India
- Language: Telugu

Pyar Mein Padipoyane (transl. I fell in love) is a 2014 Indian Telugu romantic comedy film written and directed by Ravikumar Chavali, with cinematography by T. Surendra Reddy. It was produced by K. K. Radhamohan under the Sri Sathya Sai Arts banner. It features Aadi and Shanvi Srivastava in the lead roles. The film was released worldwide on 10 May 2014. It was dubbed into Hindi under the same title.

== Plot ==
Chandra (Aadi), alias Chinna, and Yuktha (Shanvi) are childhood friends. They lose touch with one another when Chinna and his family move house. Before they leave, Chinna steals something that is of great value to Yuktha, earning her hatred.

After many years, Chinna turns out to be a talented singer, and he comes across Yuktha in his college. He falls in love with her without realising that she is his childhood friend. She turns out to be an aspiring singer too, and as a result, they soon become friends once more.

Chinna has a band named Crazy, and he invites Yuktha to be the lead singer. They come up with some good tunes and they manage to impress the heads of some music companies. Love blossoms between Chinna and Yuktha and everything is fine, until Chinna discovers that Yuktha is the girl whom he befriended when they were children.

He also finds out that Yuktha still has bad feelings about the childhood incident. Chinna tries every trick in the book to make Yuktha forget about it, but he is not successful. He also faces opposition from Ashish, who has his own plans for Yuktha.

What happens in the end? Is what forms the rest of the story of this film.

== Cast ==
- Aadi as Chandra aka Chinna
- Shanvi Srivastava as Yukta
- Vennela Kishore as Bobby
- Thagubothu Ramesh
- Prudhviraj
- Y. Kasi Viswanath
- Saptagiri as Husain Verma
- Duvvasi Mohan
- Madhunandan

== Soundtrack ==
This film has eight songs composed by Anup Rubens and lyrics are written by Bhaskarabhatla Ravi Kumar. Music released on 14 April 2014 through Aditya Music and audio launch event took place at Rock Heights in Hyderabad. Actor Manchu Manoj launched its music CDs. Many young stars like Nani, Navdeep, Adith Arun, Varun Sandesh, Sundeep Kishan, Prince, Rakul Preet Singh, Shanvi, Bhimaneni Srinivasa Rao, Saikumar and his wife attended the audio launch.

Pyar Mein Padipoyane

Soundtrack album by Anup Rubens
- Released: 14 April 2014
- Recorded: 2014
- Genre: Feature film soundtrack
- Length: 22:25
- Language: Telugu
- Label: Aditya Music
- Producer: Anup Rubens

Anup Rubens chronology
Bhimavaram Bullodu (2014)	Pyar Mein Padipoyane (2014)	Manam (2014)

Tracklist
No.	Title	Singer(s)	Length
1.	"O My Dear"	Ranjith, Yamini Sister	3:17
2.	"Pyar Mein Padipoyane"	Shreya Ghoshal	3:12
3.	"Manasuna Yedo Maya"	Vijay Prakash, Shravani, Saveri	3:13
4.	"Nuvve Nuvve Female"	Ramya NSK	2:29
5.	"Saa Ma Ri Sa"	Anjana Sowmya, Anudeep Dev	2:44
6.	"Chal Rey Chal Rey"	Rahul Nambiar	3:01
7.	"Nuvve Nuvve Male"	Anudeep Dev	2:29
8.	"Chinna Pillalu"	Aadi Saikumar	2:00
Total length:			22:25

== Reception ==
The movie received negative reviews from critics. GreatAndhra termed the film as "Passion-less Love Lore". 123telugu.com commented "‘Pyaar Mein Padipoyaane’ is a romantic comedy that has very little romance and very little comedy. In the end, it becomes a boring and routine cinema that should have been made 10 years ago. An ok second half cannot compensate for a very slow first half ".
