= Bengal Tiger (2015 film) =

Film by Sampath Nandi

- Theatrical release poster
- Directed by: Sampath Nandi
- Written by: Sampath Nandi
- Produced by: K. K. Radhamohan
- Starring: Ravi Teja; Tamannaah Bhatia; Raashii Khanna; Boman Irani
- Cinematography: Soundararajan
- Edited by: Gautham Raju
- Music by: Bheems Ceciroleo
- Production company: Sri Satya Sai Arts
- Release date: 10 December 2015
- Running time: 145 minutes
- Country: India
- Language: Telugu
- Box office: ₹40.5 crore

Bengal Tiger is a 2015 Indian Telugu-language action comedy film written and directed by Sampath Nandi. It was produced by K. K. Radhamohan's Sri Satya Sai Arts and features Ravi Teja, Tamannaah Bhatia, and Raashii Khanna. Boman Irani, Nassar, Nagineedu, Rao Ramesh, and Sayaji Shinde play supporting roles. The music was composed by Nandi's protégé, Bheems Ceciroleo. Soundararajan handled the cinematography and Gautham Raju was the editor.

The film follows Akash Narayan's revenge plot against Chief Minister Ashok Gajapati, who killed his father, involving other key characters like Samba, Nagappa, Shraddha and Meera. It was theatrically released worldwide on 10 December 2015 and received mixed reviews from critics and audiences. It emerged as a success however, grossing over ₹40.5 crore globally.

== Plot ==
Akash Narayan is an unemployed simpleton living in Atreyapuram, who spends his time hanging out with friends. He is rejected by a girl who aspires to marry someone famous. This hurts Akash, and in an attempt to become famous, hits Agriculture Minister Samba with a stone. Initially angry, Samba is impressed with Akash's wit and employs him to escort home minister Nagappa's daughter Shraddha safely from the airport as her life is in danger. Upon Shraddha's suggestion, Nagappa appoints Akash as his OSD. Shraddha gets engaged to Karan, the son of politician Subba Rayudu. She, however, falls in love with Akash after a series of incidents.

Shraddha rejects Karan and convinces Nagappa for the same. She adds that she would prefer to a like Akash to already financially settled person, as she finds the potential of making it big in Akash. On Shraddha's birthday, Nagappa hosts a big party and announces Akash as Shraddha's potential lover in the presence of many politicians, including the Chief Minister Ashok Gajapathi. Akash, however, rejects Nagappa's presence and says that he loves Meera, Gajapathi's daughter, much to everyone's shock.

When Shraddha confronts Akash, he says that their relationship is that of an employer and an employee and lies that he loved Meera, who rejected his love. Meera meets him shortly and proposes to him after being impressed with his eccentricity and spontaneity. When Gajapathi and Shraddha object, Meera defends her decision by saying that his logical thinking made her prefer Akash to others. Gajapathi then discovers that Akash is his rival Jayanarayan's son and predicts that he is seeking revenge. Akash and Gajapathi have a formal meet where they have a deal; if Gajapathi fails to kill Akash within 24 hours using any means, he has to give his consent for Akash's marriage with Meera. Akash manages to survive in that 24 hours and meets Gajapathi again after the completion of the duration. When Gajapathi offers 5 billion to forego Meera, Akash accepts it happily and shifts the entire money to his house in Atreyapuram. When Meera and Shraddha probe into this, they find out about Akash's past.

Past: Jayanarayan was befriended by Gajapathi, a struggling politician then, and poisoned the priceless medicines supplied by Jayanarayan with the help of a company. The blame falls on Jayanarayan, who was killed by Gajapathi for political gain. Akash learned this when he met the paternal uncle of the girl who rejected him initially and decides to seek revenge.

Present: Akash plans to use the money he received for development programmes in Atreyapuram on his father's death anniversary. Gajapathi is dethroned from the ministry, and his political career comes to an end after Akash provides the proofs for Gajapathi's illegal activities to the political party's executive committee, which he acquired from Gajapathi's secretary after bribing him. Gajapathi tries to kill Akash in Atreyapuram, after killing the uncle of the girl who rejected Akash, only to be attacked fatally by the local people, who are aware of his betrayal towards Jayanarayan.

The film ends with Akash's marriage with Meera and the pandit, "Celebrity" Shastri, saying that the bride will have only two children but the groom would have four, which confuses everyone. Meera shows Shraddha, who is also dressed as the bride. Shastri asks if they will share everything if they are both friends, to which Shraddha replies that he played with them before marriage, and now it is their turn to play with him.

== Cast ==
- Ravi Teja as Akash Narayan
- Tamannaah Bhatia as Meera
- Raashii Khanna as Shraddha
- Boman Irani as Chief Minister Ashok Gajapathi
- Nassar as party president
- Nagineedu as Jaya Narayan
- Rao Ramesh as Home Minister Nagappa
- Raghu Babu as Raghu Akash's friend
- Sayaji Shinde as Agriculture Minister Samba
- Brahmanandam as "Amalapuram" Paul / Amala Paul
- Posani Krishna Murali as Arjun "Celebrity Shastri"
- Prudhvi Raj as "Future Star" Siddappa
- Tanikella Bharani as RMP doctor
- Prabha as Akash's mother
- Sameer as Akash's elder brother
- Surekha Vani as Akash's elder sister-in-law
- Shyamala as Akash's younger sister-in-law
- Pragathi as Gajapathi's wife
- Pavitra Lokesh as Nagappa's wife
- Priya as Siddappa's wife
- Master Nikhil as Siddappa's son
- Rama Prabha as Akash's grandmother
- Brahmaji as Samba's assistant
- Prabhakar as Banda
- Satyam Rajesh as Rajesh
- Fish Venkat
- Duvvasi Mohan
- Priyadarshini Ram
- Jasper
- Subbaraya Sharma as priest
- Lab Sarath as DGP
- Shakalaka Shankar as Shankar
- Prabhu as Subramanyam
- Sravan as Gani Reddy
- Uma as prostitute

Cameo appearance

- Harshvardhan Rane as Karan
- Aksha Pardasany as the girl who rejects Akash
- Hamsa Nandini in the song "Bengal Tiger"

== Production ==
=== Development ===
Sampath Nandi was supposed to direct Pawan Kalyan in the sequel of Gabbar Singh (2012). The film was delayed for years, and later, Sampath chose to direct Ravi Teja after walking out of that project. Ravi Teja confirmed the news and said that he would start working on this film after completing Kick 2 (2015). Previously, Nandi wrote the script keeping Ravi Teja in mind as the lead but had wanted to prove his abilities before working together. He chose to narrate the story of a man from Athreyapuram in Godavari district who comes on a mission to Hyderabad and his conflict with an intelligent chief minister. In an interview with The Hindu, Nandi specified it as a screenplay based film with a notable flashback episode.

For this film, he adapted two fight sequences from the script written for the sequel of Gabbar Singh. The film was titled as Bengal Tiger and K. K. Radhamohan announced that he would bankroll the film under his banner Sri Satya Sai Arts. At the same time, Sampath Nandi confirmed that the script work is in its final stages. Nandi's protégé Bheems Ceciroleo was selected as the music director after Ravi Teja's approval. Soundararajan was selected as the cinematographer who stated that the film is a mass action film. The film was officially launched on 30 January 2015 at Ramanaidu Studios.

=== Casting ===
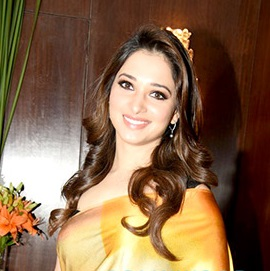
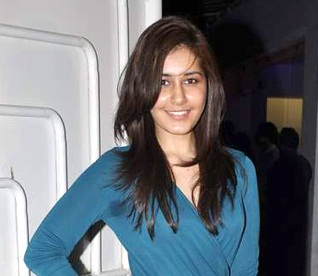
Tamannaah Bhatia (left) and Raashii Khanna (right) were signed as the female leads marking their first collaboration with Ravi Teja. The latter told The Times of India in December 2014 that both would play characters of equal importance in the film.

Ravi Teja played the role of Akash Narayan, an aimless youth with a master's degree in computers, whose reckless life changes after facing an insult. Tamannaah Bhatia, the female lead of Nandi's Racha (2012), was signed as one of the two female leads as Ravi Teja was keen on working with her. Impressed with her performance in Jil, Nandi approached Raashii Khanna to play the role of the other female lead. Khanna stated that she and Tamannaah have roles of equal importance in the film. Regarding her role, Khanna said that she would play an "intelligent girl" and shed weight for the same. She added that her subplot in the film, which explores the relationship she shares with her father (played by Rao Ramesh), has its "own importance in the overall scheme of things". Boman Irani was cast for a crucial supporting role.

Posani Krishna Murali and Sayaji Shinde were cast for key supporting roles. Nassar was signed in on for a key supporting role as well. Brahmanandam was chosen to play an important role. Ramaprabha, Tanikella Bharani, Nagineedu, and Prabhu joined the film's cast in its first schedule. Harshvardhan Rane made a cameo appearance in the film as Khanna's lover and stated that there is a love triangle between him, Ravi Teja and Khanna. Aksha Pardasany too made a cameo appearance in the film and all her scenes in the film were with Ravi Teja.

Brahmaji's inclusion in the film's cast was confirmed in late June 2015. Prabhakar and Prudhviraj confirmed their inclusion in the film's cast in early August 2015. Hamsa Nandini was signed in mid August 2015 to make a special appearance in a song. Nandini said in an interview that she would sport three looks in the song which she called a "high-fashion with a desi twist" and added that the song is a mix of massy dance beats and EDM grooves.

=== Filming ===
The principal photography began on 4 March 2015 at Ramoji Film City where scenes focusing Irani, Khanna, Shinde and others were shot until 14 March 2015. On its completion, the next schedule began from 10 April 2015 and Ravi Teja joined the film's sets along with Tamannaah and other supporting cast. The schedule was announced to be shot in Ramoji Film City, Chilkur and other areas around Hyderabad until 6 May 2015. Harshvardhan Rane joined the film's sets on 13 April 2015. Filming continued in Shamshabad from 22 April 2015, after which scenes on Ravi Teja, Tamannaah and Khanna were shot in a railway station backdrop at Ramoji Film City. The third schedule began on 13 May 2015 at Ramoji Film City where Brahmanandam and Ravi Teja joined the film's sets. Along with few scenes featuring both of them, a couple of songs were planned to be shot in the schedule.

Filming of a song featuring Ravi Teja, Tamannaah, and Khanna commenced on 23 May 2015. On its completion, 40% of the principal photography was wrapped up. The next schedule was planned from 6 June 2015 in Hyderabad to film action sequences before shifting to Pollachi for more filming. From 19 June 2015, few action sequences choreographed by Ram-Lakshman were shot on Ravi Teja and others at Ramoji Film City using Phantom Cam. Irani joined the film's sets on the next day. By then, 60% of the film's shoot was completed. Within a month, 80% of the film's shoot was wrapped up and few action sequences were being shot in and around Hyderabad. The hero introduction song choreographed by Harsha was shot on Ravi Teja, Hamsa Nandini and 120 dancers at Hyderabad in mid August 2015. The final schedule commenced at Europe from 8 September 2015 where the film's unit planned to complete the shoot of a few songs.

Two songs—one on Ravi Teja and Tamannaah and another on Ravi Teja and Khanna—were shot in the schedule. Upon their completion, the principal photography was almost wrapped up and post-production works were progressing in tandem. Few scenes were filmed in Rajahmundry, Andhra Pradesh. Initially planned to be completed in 110 working days, the filming of Bengal Tiger was wrapped up in around 100 days and the runtime stood at around 145 minutes.

== Music ==
Bengal Tiger

Soundtrack album to Bengal Tiger by Bheems Ceciroleo
- Released: 18 October 2015
- Recorded: 2015
- Genre: Feature film soundtrack
- Length: 20:38
- Language: Telugu
- Label: Junglee Music
- Producer: Bheems Cecireleo

Bheems Ceciroleo chronology
Ala Ela (2014)	Bengal Tiger (2015)	Angel (2017)

The official soundtrack of Bengal Tiger consisting of five songs was composed by Bheems Ceciroleo, the lyrics of which were written by Ramajogayya Sastry, Sri Mani, Bhaskarabhatla, and Suddala Ashok Teja along with Nandi. P. Nutana, one of the finalists of the 2011 season of Padutha Theeyaga, was selected to provide vocals for the song "Aasia" whose lyrics were penned by Nandi. Junglee Music acquired the soundtrack's marketing rights. The soundtrack was released on 18 October 2015 at Shilpakala Vedika, Hyderabad with the film's cast and crew in attendance. The soundtrack cover features a still of Ravi Teja from the song Bengal Tiger.

The soundtrack opened to positive reception. The Times of India rated the soundtrack 3.5 out of 5 stars and called it a "winner considering it keeps in line with Ravi Teja's vibrant on screen persona". Behindwoods rated the soundtrack 2.5 out of 5 stars and called it a "powerful masala album which stays true to the Ravi Teja's formulaic entertainers!". The reviewer chose Chupulatho and Banchan as the picks of the soundtrack.

Track list
No.	Title	Lyrics	Artist(s)	Length
1.	"Bengal Tiger"	Ramajogayya Sastry	Shankar Mahadevan, Bhargavi Pillai (Rap)	4:00
2.	"Aasia Khandamlo"	Sampath Nandi	Nakash Aziz, P. Nutana, Bhargavi Pillai (Rap)	4:20
3.	"Choopulatho Deepala"	Sri Mani	Vijay Prakash	3:55
4.	"Banchan"	Bhaskarabhatla, Dev Pawar (Rap)	Adnan Sami, Bheems Ceciroleo (Rap)	3:55
5.	"Raaye Raaye Chinni"	Suddala Ashok Teja	Mamta Sharma, Uma Neha, Simha	4:27
Total length:				20:38

== Release ==
Initially planned for a global release on 18 September 2015 (coinciding with Ganesh Chaturthi), the film's release date was announced as 5 November 2015 by Ravi Teja, making it one of the Diwali releases of the year, after plans to release during the Navratri festive season were called off to avoid clash with Bruce Lee - The Fighter and Akhil. The film's release was postponed twice—once on mutual consent with the makers of Akhil from 5 to 27 November 2015, and again to 10 December 2015 to avoid clash with Size Zero and Shankaraabharanam after holding discussions with Prasad V. Potluri and Kona Venkat.

Global Cinemas acquired the film's theatrical distribution rights for the Nizam region. Tata DoCoMo entered into a co-branding partnership with this film in late October 2015 and announced itself as the "exclusive telecom partner" of the film.

=== Home media ===
The Hindi dubbing rights were sold for ₹2.60 crore to a Mumbai-based distributor which is the highest ever amount for a Ravi Teja's film. A limited release was planned in Maharashtra and the distributors made an agreement with a leading Hindi film channel to screen it on the national network after 60 days of the release of the original Telugu version. The global satellite rights of the film were sold for ₹7.80 crore.

== Reception ==
=== Critical reception ===
Bengal Tiger received mixed reviews from the critics.

Y. Sunita Chowdary of The Hindu stated that Nandi "shines as a dialogue writer" and called the film "almost an epic" compared to Kick 2. Chowdary added, "Those seeking variety can stay away but those who go expecting their share of fun will not be disappointed". Sify gave 3 out of 5 stars and called Bengal Tiger a "regular mass entertainer with severe stress on comedy and glamour", adding, "Compared to recent Ravi Teja's movie, Bengal Tiger is more entertaining. The first half of the movie, Ravi Teja's antics, and Prudhvi are its strength" and pointed out that the second half "should have been better". The Hans India too gave the film 3 out of 5 stars and stated that Nandi "has come out with a full treat to mass audience", adding that the twist in the interval scene "takes the film to a new level". Suresh Kavirayani of Deccan Chronicle too gave the film 3 out of 5 stars and called the film a "regular paisa vasool film with the right dose of masala and glamour", adding that it is "far more entertaining" compared to Kick 2 and a "good comeback" for Ravi Teja. Pravallika Anjuri of Oneindia gave the film 3 out of 5 stars as well and stated, "Though Bengal Tiger is a formulaic film, it is surely a complete 'Paisa Vasool' for masses, which makes it a perfect Mass Maharaj Ravi Teja's trademark film", adding that the cinematography and production values make Bengal Tiger a "technically good film too". IndiaGlitz also gave the film 3 out of 5 stars and called Bengal Tiger a "Ravi Teja-style power-packed performance, complete with comedy doses from Prithvi Raj and Posani, not to speak of punch lines of a different shade".

Pranita Jonnalagedda of The Times of India gave the film 2.5 out of 5 stars and stated, "Sampath Nandi fails on many counts — he failed to shape the characters on screen, underused performers with amazing potential — Ravi Teja especially; and there is absolutely nothing to take home". S. S. Kamal of Bangalore Mirror too gave the film 2.5 out of 5 stars and stated, "Ravi Teja's charisma eventually prevents the film from being a complete disaster, making the first half in particular quite entertaining. If only Sampath Nandi had maintained the momentum right till the end, the result could have been so much better". Behindwoods gave 2.25 out of 5 stars and called the film a "worn-out no-brainer", adding that it is another "erratically fun outing" from Ravi Teja for whom there is "hardly a replacement" for "such weird, carefree yet lovable action hero roles". Karthik Keramalu of CNN-IBN gave the film 2 out of 5 stars and stated, "I found a giggling amount of comedy in ‘Bengal Tiger. Focus on the funny bits. It won't matter if you doze off for the rest of the film though", adding that the film is a "mixture of good comedy and dull narration". Suhas Yellapantula of The New Indian Express gave the film 1.5 out of 5 stars and stated, "The film irritates you with its banality and angers you with its loudness. It seems as if every dialogue in the film is amplified ten-fold. The humour is colourless and makes you cringe".
