= Sampath Nandi =

Indian film director

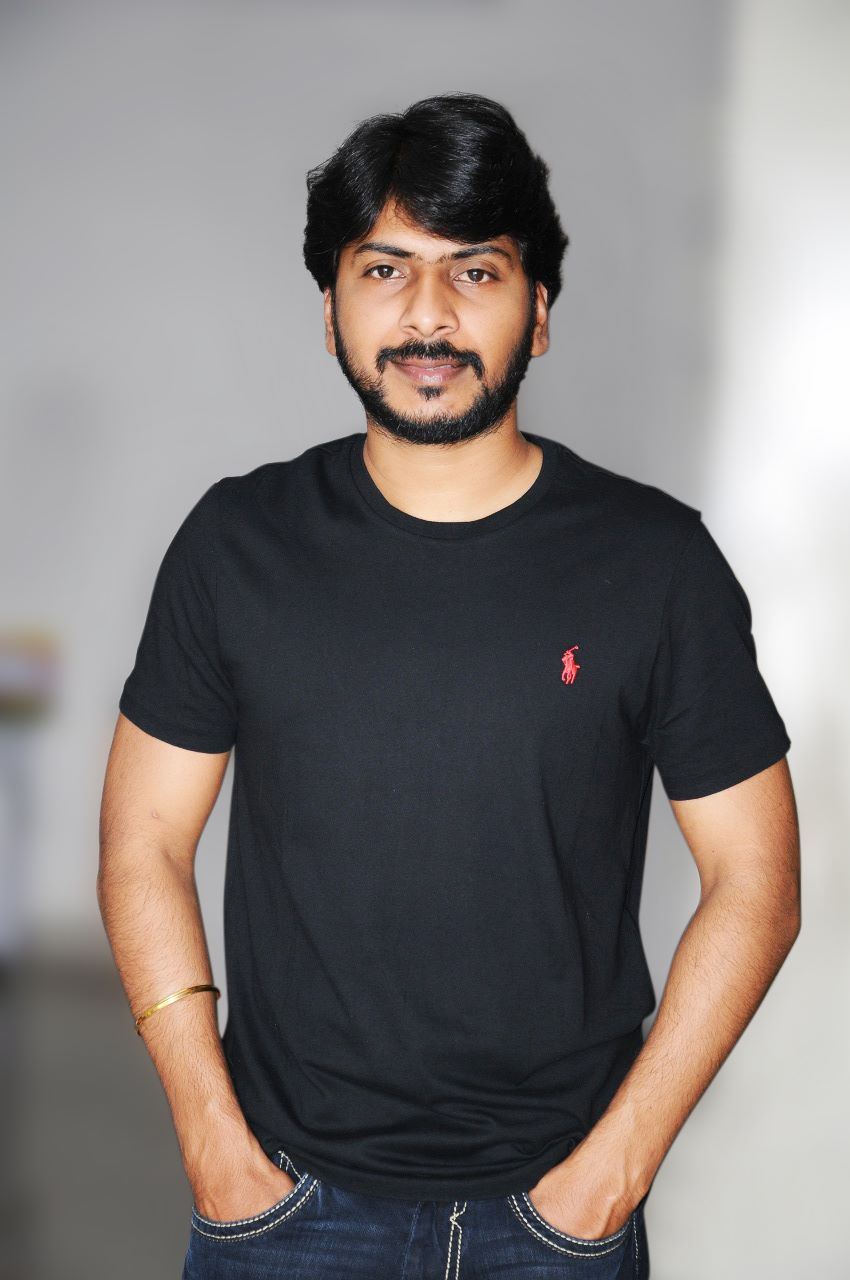
- Nandi in 2018
- Born: 20 June 1980 (age 46); Odela, Peddapalli district, Telangana India)
- Occupations: Film director; screen writer; producer

Sampath Nandi (born 20 June 1980) is an Indian film director, screenwriter and producer who works primarily in Telugu cinema.

== Career ==
After completing his Bachelor's degree in Pharmacy (B.Pharm) from the V. L. College of Pharmacy. Nandi assisted Posani Krishna Murali for about three years. In the meantime he used to make ad-films in Mumbai and Bengaluru.

In 2010, Nandi made his directorial debut with Yemaindi Ee Vela, starring Varun Sandesh and Nisha Aggarwal. It was a remarkable debut with a run of 50 days in 32 centers. His second film was 2012's Racha, starring Ram Charan and Tamannaah Bhatia which turned to be a blockbuster. The film successfully completed a 50-day run in 127 direct centers across Andhra Pradesh. and completed a 100-day run in 38 centers across Andhra Pradesh on 13 July 2012 which is a unique feat. The film collected a lifetime share of ₹450 million (US$4.8 million)

In 2015, Nandi directed Ravi Teja's film Bengal Tiger, which has Tamannaah and Raashi Khanna as lead actresses. Bengal Tiger released worldwide on 10 December 2015. In 2017, Nandi's directorial Goutham Nanda starring Gopichand, Catherine Tresa and Hansika Motwani was released.

Sampath Nandi teamed again up with Gopichand for the film Seetimaarr which is film based on Indian sport Kabaddi. The film's principal shooting started in December 2019 but was postponed due to the pandemic that took over in 2020. The film had a theatrical release on September 10, 2021. His next directorial, Bhogi starring Sharwanand, Anupama Parameswaran and Dimple Hayathi, a period drama set in the 1980s Adilabad district, is set to release worldwide on 27 Nov, 2026.

== Filmography ==
Key
†	Denotes films that have not yet been released

Year	Title	Director	Writer	Producer	Notes	Ref.
2010	Yemaindi Ee Vela	Yes	Yes	No		
2012	Racha	Yes	Yes	No		
2014	Galipatam	No	No	Yes		
2015	Bengal Tiger	Yes	Yes	No	Also lyricist for the song "Aasia"	
2017	Goutham Nanda	Yes	Yes	No		
2018	Paperboy	No	Yes	Yes		
2021	Seetimaarr	Yes	Yes	No		
2022	Odela Railway Station	No	Story	No		
2024	Simbaa	No	Yes	Yes		
2025	Odela 2	No	Yes	Yes	Also Direction Supervisor	
2026	Bhogi †	Yes	Yes	No	Filming	
TBA	Black Rose †	No	Story	No	Delayed	
