= Bogan (film) =

2017 Indian film by Lakshman

- Theatrical release poster
- Directed by: Lakshman
- Written by: K. Chandru (Dialogue)
- Screenplay by: Lakshman
- Story by: Lakshman
- Produced by: Prabhu Deva; Ishari K. Ganesh
- Starring: Arvind Swamy; Ravi Mohan; Hansika Motwani; Akshara Gowda
- Cinematography: Soundararajan
- Edited by: Anthony
- Music by: D. Imman
- Production company: Prabhu Deva Studios
- Distributed by: Sri Green Productions
- Release date: 2 February 2017
- Running time: 150 minutes
- Country: India
- Language: Tamil

Bogan (transl. Hedonist / Pleasure seeker) is a 2017 Indian Tamil-language supernatural action thriller film written and directed by Lakshman and produced by Prabhu Deva and Ganesh. The film stars Aravind Swamy and Ravi Mohan (credited as Jayam Ravi) in titular roles, with Hansika Motwani, Akshara Gowda, Nassar, Ponvannan and Naren in supporting roles. The story is about the body swapping of an honest police officer, Vikram (Ravi Mohan) and a powered thief, Aditya (Swami). Featuring music composed by D. Imman, the film began production during March 2016 and released on 2 February 2017 to positive reviews with praise for cast performances (especially Swami and Ravi's performance), story narration and Imman's music. However, the climax was criticised.

== Plot ==
ACP Vikram IPS is an honest cop who lives in Chennai with his parents, elder sister, and brother-in-law. His family sets up an arranged marriage for him with Mahalakshmi. He works with a team of police officers, Inspectors Sathya, Akshara, and Prasad, who is also Vikram's best friend. One day, Vikram is tasked with tracking Aadhithya Maravarman, a monarch's son and crooked thief, who mysteriously became rich by robbing jewellery pieces and banks. Adithya is a suave and charismatic playboy who is also involved in the drug trading and pimping business. Aadhithya gets his hands on an ancient manuscript, which enables him to access astral projection by looking straight at people's eyes, and Vikram's father is one of his victims, as the latter is blamed for the theft. Vikram swears to catch Aadhithya. He pretends to be friendly and slowly get close to Aadhithya. He manages to get Aadhithya drunk and arrests him.

Later, while interrogating him, Prasad is suddenly killed by Sathya, whose body is now occupied by Aadhithya. When Vikram goes to shoot Aadhithya out of anger, Aadhithya enters Vikram's body and begins impersonating him while Vikram is unconscious. Aadhithya, now in Vikram's body, masks the killing of Prasad by saying that Sathya and he had a personal vengeance. After coming to Vikram's home, Aadhithya comes across Maha who takes him by driving the car. He lusts for her sexy structure, and even pinches her hip in the saree, and she is initially mad, but later she does not doubt him, thinking he is being playful. Later at home, he again kisses her midriff in saree. She just brushes it off as he is being romantic after marriage. Soon, he forgets about her to focus on his revenge on Vikram. Meanwhile, Vikram, trapped in Aadhithya's body, is surprised to find himself imprisoned and gets a visit from Aadhithya, who mocks him, and tells him about his plan to make Vikram lose his job and take over his life. Vikram swears to get Aadhithya punished as planned, while the latter dismisses him, thinking he is no threat.

Afterwards, Vikram convinces Sathya that he is not Aadhithya and escapes prison. After escaping, Vikram calls his superior officer, Commissioner Rajkumar, and informs him about the mishaps of events. Aadhithya overhears their conversation and kills Rajkumar. Aadhithya later kills Akshara when Sathya reveals to her about Aadhithya. Aadhithya also reveals that he has a confession video which shows that Vikram blamed Aadhithya for his father's mistake. At the same time, Aadhithya goes over Vikram's biodata and takes the video evidence of his father, who Aadhithya had initially impersonated, to rob a bank. He threatens to reveal it to the public. Vikram contacts Professor Chezhiyan, Aadhithya's head in archaeology, where he shows him the manuscript, which gives Vikram the same power as Aadhithya. Chezhiyan thinks that he is being cheated and goes to Aadhithya. Aadhithya reveals himself in Vikram's body and makes Chezhiyan his bait to catch Vikram while in the complex where Vikram was supposed to meet Chezhiyan.

When Aadhithya tracks Chezhiyan, Vikram hides and talks to Chezhiyan, who says that Aadhithya's power is only in his body, in which Vikram is, while, in other bodies, his power does not work. Hence, Vikram uses Chezhiyan to recover the manuscript from the Commissioner's office. Aadhithya later kills Chezhiyan. Vikram puts a bomb on himself so that Aadhithya may get scared that if his body goes away, he will not be able to use his powers further. Vikram and Aadhithya switch over to their original bodies after Vikram threatens to harm Aadithya's body, and Aadhithya pleads with Vikram to diffuse his bomb. Vikram, who has double-crossed Aadhithya, knocks him out, and while taking him to get him arrested, Aadhithya switches his soul to Vikram's father, Arumugam, and thrashes Vikram. He then switches to Mahalakshmi's body, stabs him, and threatens to kill her if he does not defuse his bomb. Vikram heeds to Aadithya and defuses the bomb. As Vikram had double-crossed and betrayed him, Aadhithya drove off with the unconscious Mahalakshmi. Vikram chases them and ends up on the coast.

A weakened Vikram fights Aadhithya, who quickly recovers and fights Vikram. Vikram snaps back and brutally beats up Aadhithya. Vikram fractures Aadhithya's left hand, snaps his neck, seemingly killing him and returns home with Mahalakshmi. In the end, to everyone's horror, Aadhithya is shown to have survived and glares into the screen, paving the way to the sequel.

== Cast ==
- Arvind Swamy as Aadhithya Maravarman alias "Bogan" (originally)/ACP Vikram IPS (After Aadhithya accesses astral projection)
- Ravi Mohan as ACP Vikram IPS (originally)/ Aadhithya Maravarman alias "Bogan" (After Aadhithya accesses astral projection)
- Hansika as Mahalakshmi "Maha", Vikram's Fiancee/ later his wife
- Akshara Gowda as Inspector Akshara
- Nassar as Professor Chezhiyan
- Ponvannan as Commissioner Rajkumar IPS
- Naren as Arumugam, Vikram's father
- Nagendra Prasad as Inspector Prasad
- Varun as Inspector Sathya
- Sindhu Shyam as Vikram's sister
- Prakash Rajan as Vikram's brother-in-law
- Jaya Murali as Mahalakshmi's mother
- Raju Sundaram in a special appearance in the song "Damaalu Dumeelu"
- Soundararajan in a special appearance in the song "Damaalu Dumeelu"
- Milan in a special appearance in the song "Damaalu Dumeelu"

== Production ==
Following the commercial success of Romeo Juliet (2015), Lakshman and Ravi Mohan (formerly Jayam Ravi) announced that they would collaborate for another venture together. In August 2015, Prabhu Deva revealed that his new film studio, Prabhu Deva Studios, would associate with the actor-director pair as the producer and a launch event was held for the film, alongside Deva's other productions Sometimes (2017) and Vinodhan (2017). Lakshman initially wanted Vijay Sethupathi to portray a second leading role in the film, but his unavailability led him to consider alternate options. After discussing the role with Bobby Simha, Lakshman finalised Arvind Swamy for the role, with the actor being seen with Ravi Mohan again after the success of Thani Oruvan (2015). Meanwhile, Hansika Motwani, who starred in Romeo Juliet, also joined the team of the film during late 2015. Akshara Gowda joined the cast of the film during the first schedule and revealed that she would portray a police officer, while the co-producer Ganesh's nephew Varun and Prabhu Deva's brother Nagendra Prasad also joined the cast.

Bogan began production during March 2016 with the team filming sequences in Chennai and Pondicherry during the month. A song titled "Damaalu Dumeelu" featuring Ravi Mohan, Akshara Gowda, Varun and Nagendra Prasad shot first at Binny Mills in Chennai, while a press confirmed that most of Romeo Juliet's technical crew including music director D. Imman, cinematographer Soundararajan, editor Anthony and stunt master Dhilip Subbarayan, would be retained in Bogan. Lakshman revealed that both Ravi and Arvind Swamy would play "dual-dimensioned" roles of a police officer and a former prince, while Hansika would feature as a homemaker.

In October 2016, the film ran into trouble after an aspiring director, Anthony, alleged that the story of Bogan belonged to him. Anthony claimed that he had begun production on a film titled Halwa starring Lollu Sabha Jeeva for producer Kasthuri Raja in 2011, and after the film ran into production trouble, he had emailed a copy of the script to Bogan's co-producer, Ganesh, who later chose to make it with Lakshman as director. Anthony later claimed that Ganesh had used goondas to attack him, and that he had turned down Vikraman of the Director’s Association's request for him to take away a compensation package. In reply, Lakshman criticised Anthony and threatened him with legal action for trying to slander the film and his name, and revealed that he had been tipped off by producer Nemichand Jhabak and actress Nayanthara about Anthony's attempts to use his story in a different project. Concluding the issue, Vikraman suggested that Anthony's claims were false and that he had no sympathy for the pair of the directors as the story is not inspired from any English film Face/Off (1997). The film subsequently finished production in early November 2016, after a song choreographed by Sheriff and other patchwork was completed.

== Release ==
The creator of the film initially announced 7 October 2016 as the tentative release date of the film, but were unable to complete the film as early as they had expected. A second proposed release date of 23 December 2016 was also postponed after the makers were affected by the 2016 Indian banknote demonetisation issue. Further dates of 26 January and 9 February were also scheduled to avoid a clash with Studio Green's big budget Si3 (2017), but after Singam 3 was moved to 9 February, the makers of Bogan confirmed that they would release the film on 2 February 2017. The satellite rights of the film were sold to Sun TV.It was dubbed into Hindi as the same title in 2018 and premiered on Star Gold.

In their review of Bogan, The Hindu concluded that it was "a fair-enough popcorn thriller, anchored by a terrific Arvind Swamy" and stated that it was an improvement from Lakshman's previous film. Sify.com provided a positive review stating that the film was "entertaining and engaging" and that "Lakshman proves that he is a director with substance and can make good commercial entertainers" and that "Bogan is his breakthrough film and he is here to stay as a filmmaker". The reviewer added that "overall, Bogan is worthy of a watch for its new theme, rich visuals and music, fantastic performances by Jayam Ravi(Ravi Mohan) and Arvind Swamy and fine making by Lakshman". In contrast, another critic on Sify.com stated, "On paper, Bogan comes across as a great story idea – one that involves soul-swapping – but when translated on screen, it becomes one of those films which has a shaky start, impresses midway and then loses steam towards the end trying to play to the gallery." Similarly, the critic from The Times of India added Lakshman "gives us a thriller that begins well and is engaging for the most part, before losing some intensity towards the end".

== Soundtrack ==
Bogan

Soundtrack album by D. Imman
- Released: 3 December 2016
- Genre: Feature film soundtrack
- Label: Sony Music India

D. Imman chronology
Veera Sivaji (2016)	Bogan (2016)	Saravanan Irukka Bayamaen (2017)

The film's soundtrack is scored by D. Imman. The audio rights of the film were acquired by Sony Music India, and the complete album was released on 3 December 2016. Actor Arvind Swamy recorded a song for the film as a playback singer for the first time in his career, after having previously recited lines for songs in Iruvar (1997) and Thani Oruvan (2015). Anirudh Ravichander also recorded a song titled "Damaal Dumeel", which was released earlier than the soundtrack as a single, following the success of the song "Dandanakka" from his previous work with Imman in Lakshman's Romeo Juliet (2015). Luksimi Sivaneswaralingam from Canada and Inno Genga from the United Kingdom – both Tamil people of Sri Lankan origin – were given the opportunity by Imman to sing in the film, while established singers including Shankar Mahadevan, Shreya Ghoshal and Vijay Prakash also worked on the album.

Tamil (Original)
No.	Title	Lyrics	Singer(s)	Length
1.	"Damaalu Dumeelu"	Rokesh	Anirudh Ravichander	4:20
2.	"Senthoora"	Thamarai	Luksimi Sivaneswaralingam	4:24
3.	"Kooduvittu Koodu"	Madhan Karky	Jyothi Nooran and Arvind Swamy	4:27
4.	"Yaaro Yaaro Avan"	Aravi	Vijay Prakash	3:56
5.	"Vaarai Vaarai"	Madhan Karky	Shankar Mahadevan and Shreya Ghoshal	4:27
6.	"Senthooran (Reprise of Senthoora)"	Thamarai and Inno Genga	Inno Genga	3:48

== Awards ==
Award	Category	Recipient(s)
Vijay Awards	Best Female Playback Singer	Luksimi Sivaneswaralingam
South Indian International Movie Awards	Best Female Playback Singer	Luksimi Sivaneswaralingam
