= Lakshman (director) =

Indian Tamil language filmmaker

- Born: Chennai, Tamil Nadu.
- Occupations: Director, Distributor, Writer, Producer
- Years active: 2006 – Present

Lakshman is an Indian film distributor, director and producer who has worked in Tamil language films. He was born in Kokkarayanpettai, Erode district. Lakshman is known for directing Bhoomi (2021 film), an anti-corporate cringe film.

== Career ==
Lakshman made a breakthrough as a film distributor following the success of S. J. Surya's New (2004), which he released in the Chengalpet area of Tamil Nadu. He subsequently agreed terms to produce a film starring S. J. Surya in the lead role and the pair initially considered starting a film with Selvaraghavan as director, before finalising Thamizhvannan. The film was initially launched with the title 36-24-36, before the makers decided to use Kalvanin Kadhali, with actress Nayanthara and Shradha Arya joining the cast. The film had an average response critically and commercially.

After spending several years away from the film industry, Lakshman announced that he would make his first venture as a director with a film titled Romeo Juliet (2015) featuring Jayam Ravi in the lead role. The director had initially convinced Nayanthara to play the leading female role but did not want to repeat her pairing with Jayam Ravi, as the pair were working on another production, Raja's Thani Oruvan, at the time of casting. Subsequently, he chose to cast Hansika Motwani in a leading role instead. The film opened in June 2015 to widespread negative reviews from film critics, with Baradwaj Rangan of The Hindu writing, "the film is a disaster...it's impossible to digest the overall preposterousness...Romeo Juliet just cannot make up its mind whether it wants to be a screwball comedy or a melodrama — the tone is all over the place. And the writing is painfully inconsistent". Rediff.com wrote, "Lakshman's Romeo Juliet is just a rehash of old clichés", "he pitches love against money and there are no prizes for guessing which one wins". Similarly Sify.com wrote, "Lakshman has packaged the film in a glossy manner but it is unable to find any spark or chemistry between the lead pair" adding "his direction is amateurish and so the characters are half-baked". Despite the mixed reviews, the film performed well at the box office.

Following the commercial success of Romeo Juliet, Lakshman and Jayam Ravi announced that they would collaborate for another venture together titled Bogan (2017). In August 2015, Prabhu Deva revealed that his new film studio, Prabhu Deva Studios, would associate with the actor-director pair as the producer and a launch event was held for the film, alongside Deva's other productions Sometimes (2017) and Vinodhan (2017). Lakshman initially wanted Vijay Sethupathi to portray a second leading role in the film, but his unavailability led him to consider alternate options. After discussing the role with Bobby Simha, Lakshman finalised Arvind Swamy for the role, with the actor being seen with Jayam Ravi again after the success of Thani Oruvan (2015). Meanwhile, Hansika Motwani, who starred in Romeo Juliet, also joined the team of the film during late 2015. In October 2016, the film ran into trouble after an aspiring director, Anthony, alleged that the story of Bogan belonged to him. Anthony claimed that he had begun production on a film titled Halwa starring Lollu Sabha Jeeva for producer Kasthuri Raja in 2011, and after the film ran into production trouble, he had emailed a copy of the script to Bogan's co-producer, Ganesh, who later chose to make it with Lakshman as director. Anthony later claimed that Ganesh had used goondas to attack him, and that he had turned down Vikraman of the Director’s Association's request for him to take away a compensation package. In reply, Lakshman criticised Anthony and threatened him with legal action for trying slander the film and his name, and revealed that he had been tipped off by producer Nemichand Jhabak and actress Nayanthara about Anthony's attempts to use his story in a different project. Concluding the issue, Vikraman suggested that Anthony's claims were false and that he had no sympathy for the pair of the directors as the story seemed strongly inspired from the English film Face/Off (1997).

The next is Bhoomi (2021), his third consecutive movie with Jayam Ravi. He has directly premiered on Disney+ Hotstar.

== Filmography ==
| Year | Film | Director | Writer | Notes |
|---|---|---|---|---|
| 2015 | Romeo Juliet | Yes | Yes | |
| 2017 | Bogan | Yes | Yes | |
| 2021 | Bhoomi | Yes | Yes | |
