= Odela Railway Station =

2022 film by Ashok Teja

- Digital premier poster
- Directed by: Ashok Teja
- Written by: Sampath Nandi
- Produced by: K. K. Radhamohan
- Starring: Hebah Patel; Pujita Ponnada; Vasishta N. Simha; Sai Ronak
- Cinematography: Soundararajan
- Edited by: Tammiraju
- Music by: Anup Rubens
- Production company: Sri Sathya Sai Arts
- Distributed by: Aha
- Release date: 26 August 2022
- Running time: 91 minutes
- Country: India
- Language: Telugu

Odela Railway Station is a 2022 Indian Telugu-language crime thriller film directed by Ashok Teja and written by Sampath Nandi. Produced by K. K. Radhamohan's Sri Sathya Sai Arts, the film has an ensemble cast of Hebah Patel, Pujita Ponnada, Vasishta N. Simha and Sai Ronak. The film is based on real incidents of Odela village in Telangana. It premiered on Aha on 26 August 2022.

== Plot ==
The film opens with a striking scene: a woman, covered in mud and visibly traumatised, walks into the local police station clutching the severed head of a man. This shocking image sets the stage for a story that unfolds through a series of flashbacks.

The Murders in Odela

The village of Odela is gripped by fear due to a series of gruesome rapes & murders of newlywed brides. The killer's pattern is chillingly consistent, and the community is thrown into turmoil as suspicion and anxiety spread among the villagers.

Arrival of the Young IPS Officer

Anudeep, a young idealistic IPS officer, arrives in Odela for a three-month field training assignment. He is quickly drawn into the investigation of the murders, tasked with uncovering the identity of the serial killer who has eluded capture and terrorised the village.

Investigation and Rising Suspense

As Anudeep delves into the case, he faces a myriad of suspects—each with plausible motives and opportunities, but none fitting the complete profile of the killer. The film maintains a strong sense of suspense, avoiding genre clichés and instead focusing on realistic police work and the psychological toll on the villagers and investigators alike.

Radha's Role

Radha, a key resident of the village, becomes instrumental in the investigation. Through her own discoveries and close encounters, she stumbles upon critical evidence that brings her dangerously close to the truth. Her courage and resourcefulness play a pivotal role in aiding Anudeep's pursuit of the killer.

Climax and Revelation

The narrative builds toward a tense climax as Anudeep, with Radha's help, pieces together the clues and finally identifies the murderer. The killer's identity is revealed only in the final moments, keeping the audience guessing and the suspense intact until the very end.

Resolution

The film concludes with justice being served. The woman from the opening scene is revealed to be the killer's wife. Upon discovering her husband's horrific crimes, she takes it upon herself to stop him. In a desperate act to save the killer's next intended victim, she beheads him and brings his severed head to the authorities. Her action brings closure to the case, and the village of Odela begins to heal from the trauma that had haunted it.

== Cast ==
- Hebah Patel as Radha
- Sai Ronak as Anudeep IPS
- Vasishta N. Simha as Tirupati, Radha's husband
- Pujita Ponnada as Spoorthi, Anudeep's newly-wed bride
- Naga Mahesh
- Gagan Vihari

== Production ==
K.G.F: Chapter 1-fame actor Vasishta N. Simha was cast in the film in 2020 which was reported to be his debut in Telugu cinema. But due to the delay in the production, his next film in Tollywood, Narappa (2021) became his debut Telugu cinema release. Speaking about his character in the film with The Times of India, Simha said, "When the team narrated the story that revolves around a true incident, I was immediately sold and agreed to do it. They told me that they were ready to shoot the moment I gave a go ahead. Soon enough, I was on a flight to Hyderabad and prepping for this film. It was a good experience, as the team was very passionate. I speak a dialect of Telugu from Telangana in the film, so that added to the challenge".

The second schedule of shooting began in October 2020 after being halted due to heavy rains in Telangana.

== Release ==
After several delays in production, the film premiered on Aha on 26 August 2022.

== Reception ==
Narendra Puppala of The Hans India wrote that "Dipping into real-life happenings, the realistic crime thriller set in a rural milleu [sic] maintains the suspense till the climax, without resorting to the worn-out cliches normally associated with the genre". Shyamala Tulasi of Sakshi Post gave a rating of 3 out of 5 and stated:"Odela Railway Station is a movie which has its high moments. The film does pique the curiosity of the audience but fails to deliver in some places predictable movie at some points."

== Sequel ==
Odela 2 is the sequel to Odela Railway Station. Written by Sampath Nandi and directed by Ashok Teja, the supernatural thriller stars Tamannaah Bhatia in the lead role. Hebah Patel, who played the lead in the original film, returns in a supporting role. The cast also includes Vasishta N. Simha, Yuva, Naga Mahesh, among others. The music is composed by B. Ajaneesh Loknath, and cinematography was handled by Soundararajan. The film was released on 17 April 2025.
