= Romeo Juliet (2015 film) =

2015 Indian film by Lakshman

- Theatrical release poster
- Directed by: Lakshman
- Written by: Lakshman
- Produced by: S. Nanthagopal
- Starring: Ravi Mohan; Hansika Motwani
- Cinematography: Soundararajan
- Edited by: Anthony
- Music by: D. Imman
- Production company: Madras Enterprises
- Distributed by: Cosmo Village; Antenna Entertainments (Malaysia)
- Release date: 12 June 2015
- Running time: 150 minutes
- Country: India
- Language: Tamil

Romeo Juliet is a 2015 Indian Tamil-language romantic comedy film written and directed by Lakshman in his directorial debut. The film stars Ravi Mohan (credited as Jayam Ravi) and Hansika Motwani, with music composed by D. Imman. The title alludes to William Shakespeare play Romeo and Juliet though the film is not based on it. The film was released on 12 June 2015.

== Plot ==
Aishwarya is an air hostess, and she grew up in an orphanage, growing up deprived of money, so Aishwarya believes that marrying into a rich family is the only way to find happiness in her life. After Aishwarya meets Karthik on a flight, Aishwarya falls in love with Karthik, assuming Karthik is rich and Aishwarya continues to dig for more information on where Karthik lives and what Karthik does for work. On the other hand, Karthik also falls in love with Aishwarya for her charm and beauty, but when Aishwarya finds out the truth that Karthik is only a gym trainer, and Karthik is renting bachelor quarters, Aishwarya breaks up with Karthik. Although Karthik tries to convince Aishwarya that their relationship can work out even without riches, Aishwarya is persistent on money being the essential factor. Aishwarya humiliates Karthik on a day out when he can prove that he can look after her for a day.

A few months later, Aishwarya enters into a relationship with Arjun, a rich business magnate and Arjun's family agrees to Arjun's and Aishwarya's wedding. Karthik comes to Arjun's and Aishwarya's engagement party with a gift and lets her know the next day that he's ecstatic that she's moved on, but Aishwarya's job now is to find Karthik a suitable girl to move on with, or Karthik will let Arjun know of Karthik's and Aishwarya's past together. Aishwarya tries to get out of it but she eventually takes the task seriously. After so many failed attempts, Aishwarya connects Karthik with Nisha. Karthik and Nisha gets into their relationship, but Aishwarya finds that she has enjoyed spending time with Karthik again, and they part amicably, promising to hang out again soon.

As Arjun's and Aishwarya's wedding approaches, Aishwarya gets disturbed by the strict lifestyle imposed by her rich family. One day, Aishwarya meets Karthik at a temple, and Karthik tells Aishwarya that Karthik and Nisha are getting engaged the night before Valentine's Day. Arjun's and Aishwarya's wedding is set to take place in London the night before Valentine's Day. Aishwarya finds hard to say goodbye to Karthik forever.

On the night Arjun and Aishwarya is supposed to leave to London, Aishwarya finally realises that she doesn't want to be with Arjun or Arjun's strict family Aishwarya tells Arjun that they both will never get married and she wants to go away from him and his strict family. Arjun tells Aishwarya that from now on, she is free to live the way she chooses. His family won't try, and control her anymore, but when Aishwarya still appears hesitant, Arjun firmly questions Aishwarya to open up. Aishwarya tells Arjun that she is in love with Karthik, Arjun tells Aishwarya to go away from him and his family right now and never come back again. A crying Aishwarya heads to Karthik's and Nisha's engagement party. Aishwarya confesses her feelings and her love to Karthik but Karthik rejects Aishwarya harshly. Karthik and Nisha leaves the party early, leaving a distraught Aishwarya behind. The Disc Jockey starts playing another song to start a flash mob and reveals Karthik at the back, where Karthik reveals that Karthik and Nisha orchestrated the relationship to make Aishwarya realise her mistake and love for him. Karthik and Aishwarya finally reunites with each other.

== Cast ==
- Ravi Mohan as Karthik
- Hansika Motwani as Aishwarya
- Vamsi Krishna as Arjun
- Poonam Bajwa as Nisha
- Shankara Narayanan as Karthik's father
- Uma Padmanabhan as Karthik's mother
- Madhumila as Priya
- Shreya Gupto as Tina
- Myna Nandhini as Divyashree
- Mathew Varghese as Arjun's relative
- Bhawana Aneja as Arjun's relative
- Jeevitha Shankar as Arjun's relative
- VTV Ganesh as VTV Ganesh
- Arya as Actor Arya (cameo appearance)

== Production ==
Lakshman, who had previously ventured into films as producer of Kalvanin Kadhali (2006), announced that he would make his first venture as a director with a film titled Romeo Juliet featuring Jayam Ravi in the lead role. Despite its title, it is not based on the William Shakespeare play Romeo and Juliet. The director had initially finalised/convinced Nayantara to play the leading female role but did not want to repeat her pairing with Jayam Ravi, as the pair were working on another production, Raja's Thani Oruvan, at the time of casting. Subsequently, he chose to cast Hansika Motwani in a leading role instead. A photo shoot was then held and promotional stills featuring the lead pair were released to the media in late March 2014. Hansika revealed that she would play a girl with a "futuristic attitude", while Jayam Ravi's character would be more conservative in the romantic comedy.

The film's first official poster released on 14 April 2014, coinciding with Tamil New Years Day and indicated that filming had begun. The team held their first schedule in May 2014, with Poonam Bajwa joining the cast. The team shot a sequence where real-life actors approach Jayam Ravi's character, a fitness trainer, to help them achieve six pack abs, with Arya making a guest appearance.

The first look teaser was released on 29 December 2014 with only the lead cast appearing on it.

== Soundtrack ==
Romeo Juliet

Soundtrack album by D. Imman
- Released: 2015
- Genre: Feature film soundtrack
- Length: 26:58
- Language: Tamil

D. Imman chronology
Valiyavan (2015)	Romeo Juliet (2015)	Vasuvum Saravananum Onna Padichavanga (2015)

D. Imman composed the soundtrack album and score for the film. G. Rokesh, Madhan Karky and Thamarai wrote the lyrics.

Track listing
No.	Title	Lyrics	Singer(s)	Length
1.	"Dandanakka"	Rokesh	Anirudh Ravichander	4:20
2.	"Thoovaanam"	Thamarai	Vishal Dadlani, Sunitha Sarathy	4:26
3.	"Idarkuthaane Aasaipattai Balakumari"	Madhan Karky	Vaikom Vijayalakshmi	4:01
4.	"Romeo Romeo"	Madhan Karky	Vishal Dadlani, Hyde Karty	4:32
5.	"Adiye Ivale" (Arakki)	Madhan Karky	Anthony Daasan	4:47
6.	"Thoovaanam" (Reprise)	Thamarai	Sunitha Sarathy	4:52
Total length:				26:58

== Release ==
The film was released worldwide 12 June 2015. The satellite rights of the film were sold to Sun TV.

=== Critical reception ===
Baradwaj Rangan from The Hindu wrote, "The film is a disaster...it's impossible to digest the overall preposterousness...Romeo Juliet just cannot make up its mind whether it wants to be a screwball comedy or a melodrama — the tone is all over the place. And the writing is painfully inconsistent". The Times of India gave the film 2/5 and wrote, "here is a film that could prove to be a worthy challenger to Valiyavan for the title of the Most Preposterous Movie of the Year. Rediff also gave it 2/5 and wrote, "Lakshman's Romeo Juliet is just a rehash of old clichés. He pitches love against money and there are no prizes for guessing which one wins". Sify wrote, "Lakshman has packaged the film in a glossy manner but it is unable to find any spark or chemistry between the lead pair. His direction is amateurish and so are the characters half-baked. The best thing about Romeo Juliet is Jayam Ravi and Hansika who does their best to rise above the flawed script". The New Indian Express wrote, "The film, an average entertainer, would have been more engaging if only the screenplay had been coherent and the episodes interesting".
